= Billboard Top Country & Western Records of 1954 =

Billboard Top Country & Western Records of 1954 is made up of two year-end charts compiled by Billboard magazine ranking the year's top country and western records based on record sales and juke box plays.

Hank Snow's "I Don't Hurt Anymore" was the year's No. 1 record on both the record sales and juke box charts.

"One by One", a duet by Kitty Wells and Red Foley, ranked No. 2 on both charts.

Webb Pierce had four of the year's top 10 best-selling records with "Slowly" (No. 3), "Even Tho" (No. 4), "More and More" (No. 6), and "There Stands the Glass" (No. 8).

Other artists with multiple records on the year-end lists included Slim Whitman and Eddy Arnold with three each.

Retail year-end	Juke box year-end	Peak (Note: This column recites the record's peak position on Billboard's weekly charts.)	Title	Artist(s)	Label
1	1	1	"I Don't Hurt Anymore"	Hank Snow	RCA Victor
2	2	1	"One by One"	Kitty Wells, Red Foley	Decca
3	3	1	"Slowly"	Webb Pierce	Decca
4	4	1	"Even Tho"	Webb Pierce	Decca
5	5	1	"I Really Don't Want to Know"	Eddy Arnold	RCA Victor
6	14	1	"More and More"	Webb Pierce	Decca
7	7	2	"You Better Not Do That"	Tommy Collins	Capitol
8	13	1	"There Stands the Glass"	Webb Pierce	Decca
9	6	4	"Rose Marie"	Slim Whitman	Imperial
10	18	2	"I'll Be There (If You Ever Want Me)"	Ray Price	Columbia
11	11	1	"Bimbo"	Jim Reeves	Abbott
12	20	3	"This Is the Thanks I Get (For Loving You)"	Eddy Arnold	RCA Victor
13	26	2	"This Ole House"	Stuart Hamblen	RCA Victor
14	10	4	"Sparkling Brown Eyes"	Webb Pierce	Decca
15	8	4	"Looking Back to See"	Goldie Hill, Justin Tubb	Decca
16	NR	2	"Secret Love"	Slim Whitman	Imperial
17	16	2	"Back Up Buddy"	Carl Smith	Columbia
18	9	2	"Wake Up Irene"	Hank Thompson	Capitol
19	15	6	"Release Me"	Ray Price	Columbia
20	21	3	"Goodnight, Sweetheart, Goodnight"	Johnnie & Jack	RCA Victor
21	22	1	"Let Me Be the One"	Hank Locklin	4 Star
22	26	3	"If You Don't Someone Else Will"	Jimmy & Johnny	Chess
23	NR	5	"Release Me"	Jimmy Heap	Capitol
24	23	8	"As Far As I'm Concerned"	Red Foley	Decca
25	NR	1	"(Oh Baby Mine) I Get So Lonely"	Johnnie & Jack	RCA Victor
26	25	7	"Hep Cat Baby"	Eddy Arnold	RCA Victor
27	28	3	"I Love You"	Ginny Wright, Jim Reeves	Fabor
28	NR	4	"Whatcha Gonna Do Now"	Tommy Collins	Capitol
29	NR	4	"Go, Boy Go"	Carl Smith	Columbia
30	NR	4	"Honky Tonk Girl"	Hank Thompson	Capitol
NR	12	3	"Courtin' in the Rain"	T. Texas Tyler	4 Star
NR	17	4	"Don't Drop It"	Terry Fell	X
NR	18		"Such a Night"	Slim Whitman	Imperial
NR	24	4	"Cry, Cry, Darling"	Jimmy C. Newman	Dot
NR	29	9	"River of No Return"	Tennessee Ernie Ford	Capitol
NR	30	8	"Release Me"	Kitty Wells	Decca

== See also ==
- List of Billboard number-one country songs of 1954
- Billboard year-end top 30 singles of 1954
- 1954 in country music
