= 1954 in country music =

This is a list of notable events in country music that took place in the year 1954.

== Events ==
- January 4 — Elvis Presley records a 10-inch acetate demo at the Memphis Recording Studio; the two songs are "Casual Love Affair" and "I'll Never Stand In Your Way".
- February 20 — "Slowly" by Webb Pierce becomes the first No. 1 song on Billboard's country charts to feature the pedal steel guitar.
- June 19 — Top recording "I Don't Hurt Anymore" by Hank Snow begins 20-week run at #1 on Best Seller list. "One by One" by Red Foley and Kitty Wells begins 21-week run at #2 on same chart, spending a single week at No. 1 later in the year. For most of the summer and fall, "I Don't Hurt Anymore" holds "One By One" out of the top spot.
- July 17 — Ozark Jubilee debuts (on radio) as a weekly live broadcast over KWTO-AM. On August 7, ABC Radio begins carrying 25 minutes of the program nationally, hosted by Red Foley.
- July 6 — Elvis Presley releases his first single, "That's All Right"/"Blue Moon of Kentucky". A month later, Billboard gives the song a positive review, with the reviewer calling Presley a "strong new talent," and by September is a No. 1 hit in Memphis.
- October 2 — Elvis Presley makes his one and only appearance on the Grand Ole Opry. Two weeks later, debuted on the Louisiana Hayride and is soon making regular appearances.
- November 13 — A Billboard disc jockey poll reports that disc jockeys are playing 11 percent country on radio stations, compared to 42 percent pop and 5 percent rhythm and blues.
- November 20 — Bartenders in Hammond, Indiana request that disc jockeys at WJOB radio stop playing Ferlin Husky's "The Drunken Driver", about an intoxicated driver who causes a crash that kills two children; the song "is hurting business," the union claimed.

=== No dates ===
- The 45 RPM vinyl record has all but taken over, both at the radio station and in stores. Few disc jockeys are still playing 78 RPM records (save for oldies).
- Elvis Presley makes his first Sun Records recordings in Memphis, Tennessee. His 1954 releases are only regional hits. Presley was one of several artists who make their earliest recordings for Sun Records. Late in the year, Johnny Cash records two songs he wrote, "Wide Open Road" and "You're My Baby".
- After a string of minor successes with singles and 10" vinyl records, RCA Victor releases Chet Atkins' first LP, A Session with Chet Atkins.
- George Jones and Johnny Cash make their debuts.

== Top hits of the year ==
=== Number one hits ===
==== United States ====
(as certified by Billboard)

Date	Single Name	Artist	Wks. No.1	Notes
January 19	Bimbo	Jim Reeves	3	^{[2]}
February 20	Slowly	Webb Pierce	17
February 20	Wake Up, Irene	Hank Thompson and His Brazo Valley Boys	2
May 15	I Really Don't Want to Know	Eddy Arnold	1
June 12	(Oh Baby Mine) I Get So Lonely	Johnnie & Jack	2	^{[A]}
June 19	I Don't Hurt Anymore	Hank Snow (The Singing Ranger) and His Rainbow Ranch Boys	20	^{[1]}: Snow's first Number One since 1950's "The Golden Rocket".
July 3	Even Tho	Webb Pierce	2
July 31	One By One	Red Foley and Kitty Wells	1
November 6	More and More	Webb Pierce	10	^{[2]}

Notes

- 1 No. 1 song of the year, as determined by Billboard.
- 2 Song dropped from No. 1 and later returned to top spot.
- A Only Billboard No. 1 hit for that artist.

Note: Several songs were simultaneous No. 1 hits on the separate "Most Played in Juke Boxes," "Most Played by Jockeys" and "Best Sellers in Stores" charts.

=== Other major hits ===
US	Single	Artist
8	As Far as I'm Concerned	Red Foley and Betty Foley
2	Back Up Buddy	Carl Smith
15	Backward, Turn Backward	Pee Wee King
9	Beware of "It"	Johnnie & Jack
9	Bimbo	Pee Wee King
10	Breakin' the Rules	Hank Thompson
14	Call Me Up (And I'll Come Calling On You)	Marty Robbins
4	Changing Partners	Pee Wee King
9	Cheatin's a Sin	Kitty Wells
12	Christmas Can't Be Far Away	Eddy Arnold
3	Courtin' in the Rain	T. Texas Tyler
4	Cry, Cry, Darling	Jimmy C. Newman
7	Dog-Gone It, Baby, I'm in Love	Carl Smith
4	Don't Drop It	Terry Fell
9	A Fooler, A Faker	Hank Thompson
4	Go, Boy, Go	Carl Smith
8	Good Deal, Lucille	Al Terry
3	Goodnight, Sweetheart, Goodnight	Johnnie & Jack
7	Hep Cat Baby	Eddy Arnold
14	Hernando's Hideaway	Homer and Jethro
15	Honey, I Need You	Johnnie & Jack
12	Honey Love	The Carlisles
9	Honky-Tonk Girl	Hank Thompson
9	Hootchy Kootchy Henry (From Hawaii)	Mitchell Torok
3	I Love You	Ginny Wright and Jim Reeves
2	I'll Be There (If You Ever Want Me)	Ray Price
12	I'm a Stranger in My Home	Kitty Wells and Red Foley
3	I'm Walking the Dog	Webb Pierce
3	If You Don't Somebody Else Will	Jimmy & Johnny
8	If You Don't Somebody Else Will	Ray Price
7	Jilted	Red Foley
4	Looking Back to See	Goldie Hill and Justin Tubb
8	Looking Back to See	The Browns
13	Much Too Young to Die	Ray Price
7	My Everything	Eddy Arnold
15	Never	Marilyn Myers and Wesley Tuttle
3	The New Green Light	Hank Thompson
9	Out Behind the Barn	Little Jimmy Dickens
8	Place for Girls Like You	Faron Young
12	Pretty Words	Marty Robbins
5	Release Me	Jimmy Heap and Perk Williams
6	Release Me	Ray Price
8	Release Me	Kitty Wells
9	River of No Return	Tennessee Ernie Ford
4	Rose-Marie	Slim Whitman
8	Run 'Em Off	Lefty Frizzell
2	Secret Love	Slim Whitman
15	Shake-a-Leg	The Carlisles
14	She Done Give Her Heart to Me	Sonny James
4	Singing Hills	Slim Whitman
4	Sparking Brown Eyes	Webb Pierce and The Wilburn Brothers
5	Tain't Nice (To Talk Like That)	The Carlisles
8	Thank You for Calling	Billy Walker
10	That Crazy Mambo Thing	Hank Snow
15	Then I'll Stop Loving You	Jim Reeves
3	This Is the Thanks I Get (For Loving You)	Eddy Arnold
2	This Ole House	Stuart Hamblen
14	Thou Shalt Not Steal	Kitty Wells
11	Two Glasses, Joe	Ernest Tubb
10	We've Gone Too Far	Hank Thompson
4	Whatcha Gonna Do Now	Tommy Collins
7	You All Come	Arlie Duff
2	You Better Not Do That	Tommy Collins
8	You Can't Have My Love	Wanda Jackson with Billy Gray
4	You're Not Mine Anymore	Webb Pierce

== Births ==
- April 29 — Karen Brooks, female vocalist best known for her No. 1 duet with T.G. Sheppard, "Fakin' Love."
- July 13 -- Louise Mandrell, female vocalist/musician. Was part of the Barbara Mandrell and the Mandrell sisters TV show on NBC 80-82. Had a series of country albums and hits 70's and 80's. Starred in her own theater for 8 years in Pigeon Forge TN.
- July 18 — Ricky Skaggs, artist who fused bluegrass and contemporary country sounds in the 1980s.
- October 30 — T. Graham Brown, blues-styled country artist of the 1980s.
- October 30 — Jeannie Kendall, daughter half of The Kendalls.
- December 13 — John Anderson, honky tonk-styled singer since the early 1980s (d. 2026).
- December 25 — Steve Wariner, singer-songwriter and guitarist since the early 1980s.

== Deaths ==
- December 1 — Fred Rose, 56, songwriter and founder of Acuff-Rose Music. One of the first three inductees into the Country Music Hall of Fame.
