= 1955 in country music =

This is a list of notable events in country music that took place in the year 1955.

== Events ==
- January 22 — Ozark Jubilee debuts on ABC-TV, the first popular country music show on network TV. It would run through September 1960.
- July 15 — Slim Whitman's "Rose Marie" becomes an international smash, debuting on the British charts and quickly rising to No. 1; its 11-week run will stand as one of the longest runs for many years.
- July 27 — Billboard magazine claims that Webb Pierce is one of only two singing stars that "can be considered guaranteed hitmakers these days"; pop and R&B singer Nat King Cole is the other.
- November 12 — Elvis Presley is voted the most promising country and western artist, according to Billboard magazine's annual disc jockey poll.

=== No dates ===
- 1955 was one of the most prolific years for new artists, many of whom would revolutionize country music. Some of the more prominent names were Johnny Cash, George Jones, Elvis Presley and Porter Wagoner; it was also the year one of the best-known duos ever — the Louvin Brothers (Charlie and Ira) — would join the Grand Ole Opry. Many of them would go on to record and popularize the best known songs in the genre, and have recording careers that lasted for decades. It would be more than 30 years before another gifted group this prominent would rise to fame and create a revolution in country music in a single year.

== Top hits of the year ==
=== Number-one hits ===
==== United States ====
(as certified by Billboard)

Date	Single Name	Artist	Wks. No.1	Spec. Note
January 8	Loose Talk	Carl Smith	7
January 29	Let Me Go, Lover!	Hank Snow	2	Cover of Joan Weber's 1955 Number One hit on the Billboard Pop chart.
February 26	In the Jailhouse Now	Webb Pierce	21	^{[1]}: Cover of Jimmie Rodgers' 1928 song.
June 18	Live Fast, Love Hard, Die Young	Faron Young	3
July 9	A Satisfied Mind	Porter Wagoner	4	^{[A]}: Country artists Red Foley (with wife Betty) and Jean Shepard both recorded versions of the song that reached the Top 5 on the Billboard country chart in 1955.
July 16	I Don't Care	Webb Pierce	12
October 8	The Cattle Call	Eddy Arnold	2
October 22	Love Love Love	Webb Pierce	13	^{[2]}
October 22	That Do Make It Nice	Eddy Arnold	2
December 17	Sixteen Tons	Tennessee Ernie Ford	10

Notes

- 1 No. 1 song of the year, as determined by Billboard.
- 2 Song dropped from No. 1 and later returned to top spot.
- A First Billboard No. 1 hit for that artist.

Note: Several songs were simultaneous No. 1 hits on the separate "Most Played in Juke Boxes," "Most Played by Jockeys" and "Best Sellers in Stores" charts.

=== Other major hits ===
US	Single	Artist
2	All Right	Faron Young
13	Annie Over	Hank Thompson
2	Are You Mine	Ginny Wright and Tom Tall
6	Are You Mine	Myrna Lorrie and Buddy DeVal
14	Are You Mine	Red Sovine and Goldie Hill
3	As Long as I Live	Kitty Wells and Red Foley
5	Baby Let's Play House	Elvis Presley
4	The Ballad of Davy Crockett	Tennessee Ernie Ford
10	The Ballad of Davy Crockett	Mac Wiseman
4	Beautiful Lies	Jean Shepard
7	Blue Darlin'	Jimmy C. Newman
5	Born to Be Happy	Hank Snow
7	Breakin' In Another Heart	Hank Thompson
11	The Cattle Call	Slim Whitman
7	Company's Comin'	Porter Wagoner
14	Cry! Cry! Cry!	Johnny Cash
7	Cryin', Prayin', Waitin', Hopin'	Hank Snow
5	Cuzz Yore So Sweet	Simon Crum
8	Daddy, You Know What?	Jim Wilson
7	Daydreamin'	Jimmy C. Newman
12	Don't Forget	Eddy Arnold
5	Don't Take It Out On Me	Hank Thompson
11	Don't Tease Me	Carl Smith
9	Drinking Tequila	Jim Reeves
11	Go Back You Fool	Faron Young
4	Hearts of Stone	Red Foley
7	Here Today and Gone Tomorrow	The Browns
13	His Hands	Tennessee Ernie Ford
10	I Dreamed of a Hill-Billy Heaven	Eddie Dean
6	I Feel Better All Over (More Than Anywhere's Else)	Ferlin Husky
8	I Gotta Go Get My Baby	Justin Tubb
13	I Guess I'm Crazy	Tommy Collins
11	I Love You Mostly	Lefty Frizzell
10	I Thought of You	Jean Shepard
6	I Walked Alone Last Night	Eddy Arnold
13	I Wanna Wanna Wanna	The Wilburn Brothers
14	I'll Baby Sit with You	Ferlin Husky
7	I'm Glad I Got to See You Once Again	Hank Snow
10	I'm Gonna Fall Out of Love with You	Webb Pierce
12	I'm in Love with You	Kitty Wells
2	I've Been Thinking	Eddy Arnold
7	I've Kissed You My Last Time	Kitty Wells
12	If Lovin' You Is Wrong	Hank Thompson
2	If You Ain't Lovin'	Faron Young
7	If You Were Me	Webb Pierce
7	In the Jailhouse Now No. 2	Jimmie Rodgers
6	In Time	Eddy Arnold
5	It Tickles	Tommy Collins
2	Just Call Me Lonesome	Eddy Arnold
8	The Kentuckian Song	Eddy Arnold
7	Kiss-Crazy Baby	Johnnie & Jack
5	Kisses Don't Lie	Carl Smith
7	Little Tom	Ferlin Husky
5	Mainliner (The Hawk with Silver Wings)	Hank Snow
6	Make Believe ('Til We Can Make It Come True)	Kitty Wells and Red Foley
2	Making Believe	Kitty Wells
5	Making Believe	Jimmy Work
9	Maybellene	Marty Robbins
13	Mister Sandman	Chet Atkins
5	More Than Anything Else in the World	Carl Smith
6	Most of All	Hank Thompson
15	The Next Voice You Hear	Hank Snow
13	No, I Don't Believe I Will	Carl Smith
14	No One Dear but You	Johnnie & Jack
11	Old Lonesome Times	Carl Smith
5	Penny Candy	Jim Reeves
9	Please Don't Let Me Love You	Hank Williams
10	The Richest Man (In the World)	Eddy Arnold
15	S.O.S.	Johnnie & Jack
3	A Satisfied Mind	Red Foley and Betty Foley
4	A Satisfied Mind	Jean Shepard
15	Silver Bell	Hank Snow and Chet Atkins
14	So Lovely, Baby	Rusty & Doug
11	Sure Fire Kisses	Justin Tubb and Goldie Hill
13	Take Possession	Jean Shepard
7	That's All Right	Marty Robbins
6	That's What Makes the Juke Box Play	Jimmy Work
3	There She Goes	Carl Smith
9	There's Poison in Your Heart	Kitty Wells
7	Thirty Days (To Come Back Home)	Ernest Tubb
14	Time Goes By	Marty Robbins
9	Two Kinds of Love	Eddy Arnold
10	Untied	Tommy Collins
12	Wait a Little Longer Please, Jesus	Carl Smith
8	When I Stop Dreaming	The Louvin Brothers
7	Whose Shoulder Will You Cry On	Kitty Wells
4	Why Baby Why	George Jones
5	Wildwood Flower	Hank Thompson and Merle Travis
3	Would You Mind?	Hank Snow
7	The Yellow Rose of Texas	Ernest Tubb
3	Yellow Roses	Hank Snow
4	Yonder Comes a Sucker	Jim Reeves
15	You Oughta See Pickles Now	Tommy Collins

== Births ==
- March 11 — Jimmy Fortune, songwriter and member of The Statler Brothers (he sang tenor).
- March 17 — Paul Overstreet, singer-songwriter who penned hit singles for artists such as Randy Travis and Tanya Tucker, and also had a career as a recording artist as well.
- March 26 — Dean Dillon, songwriter whose works were instrumental in the new traditionalist movement of the 1980s.
- March 28 — Reba McEntire, singer and actress who has enjoyed fame since the early 1980s.
- May 11 — Mark Herndon, drummer with Alabama.
- May 12 — Kix Brooks, half of Brooks & Dunn; host of radio's American Country Countdown.
- May 23 — Garry Koehler, Australian country musician and songwriter (died 2019).
- May 24 — Rosanne Cash, daughter of Johnny Cash; rose to fame in the early 1980s for her "alternative country" style.
- July 1 — Keith Whitley, honky tonk-styled singer of the 1980s (died 1989).
- September 24 — Lane Brody, female vocalist best known for dueting with Johnny Lee on 1984's "The Yellow Rose".
- November 1 — Keith Stegall, record producer who enjoyed a string of hits in the mid-1980s.
