= List of Billboard number-one country songs of 1954 =

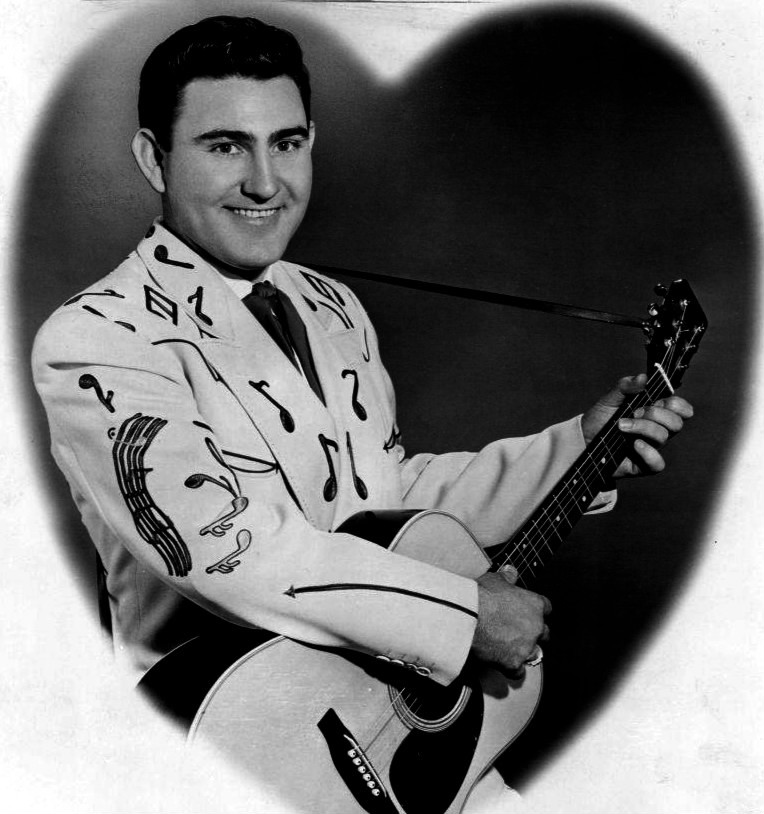
Webb Pierce had three of the only four number ones on the best sellers chart in 1954 and also took a fourth song to number one on the jockeys chart.

In 1954 Billboard magazine published three charts covering the best-performing country music songs in the United States: Most Played in Juke Boxes, National Best Sellers (renamed Best Sellers in Stores with the February 20 issue of the magazine), and Most Played By Jockeys. The three charts had been published since 1944, 1948 and 1949 respectively. The juke box chart would be discontinued in 1957 and the other two charts merged in 1958 to form a multimetric chart, which has been published weekly since that date and since 2005 has been entitled Hot Country Songs.

The number one position on all three charts was dominated in 1954 by singer Webb Pierce, who had inherited the mantle of the most popular act in country music since the death of Hank Williams in 1953 and who was in the midst of a run of success which included 12 chart-toppers in a four-year period. On the best sellers chart, Pierce's singles "There Stands the Glass", "Slowly" and "More and More" spent a combined total of 32 weeks in the top spot, and he held the top spot from the start of the year until mid-June without interruption. On the juke box chart, the same three songs spent 29 weeks at number one, or 30 if the chart dated March 6 is counted twice, as in that week "There Stands the Glass" and "Slowly" tied for the top spot. On the jockeys chart, Pierce spent a total of 29 weeks at number one with four songs, including "Even Tho", which did not reach the top of the other two listings. "More and More" was the year's final number one on all three charts. "Slowly" was the first country chart-topper to feature the pedal steel guitar, an instrument which would go on to become a staple of the genre.

The longest-running number one song of the year on all three charts was Hank Snow's "I Don't Hurt Anymore". The Canadian singer spent twenty consecutive weeks atop the best sellers chart with the song, the only chart-topper of the year on that listing not to be by Pierce. This set a new record for the longest unbroken run at number one on any of Billboard's country charts, although it fell one week short of the record for the highest cumulative total number of weeks at number one by a song, which Snow himself held jointly with Eddy Arnold. "I Don't Hurt Anymore" also spent twenty non-consecutive weeks at number one on the juke box chart, and a total of eighteen weeks in the top spot on the jockeys listing. One act achieved a debut country number one in 1954. Johnnie & Jack spent two weeks in the top spot of the jockeys chart with "(Oh Baby Mine) I Get So Lonely", the only number one for the duo. Six weeks after Johnnie Wright, one half of Johnnie & Jack, spent his final week at number one, his wife Kitty Wells reached the top spot with "One by One", a duet with Red Foley. She was the only female artist to top the chart in 1954. "One by One" was the final chart-topper for Foley, who had achieved his first number one ten years earlier and had been among the most prolific acts in the first decade of Billboard's country music charts, with more than 50 entries.

== Chart history ==
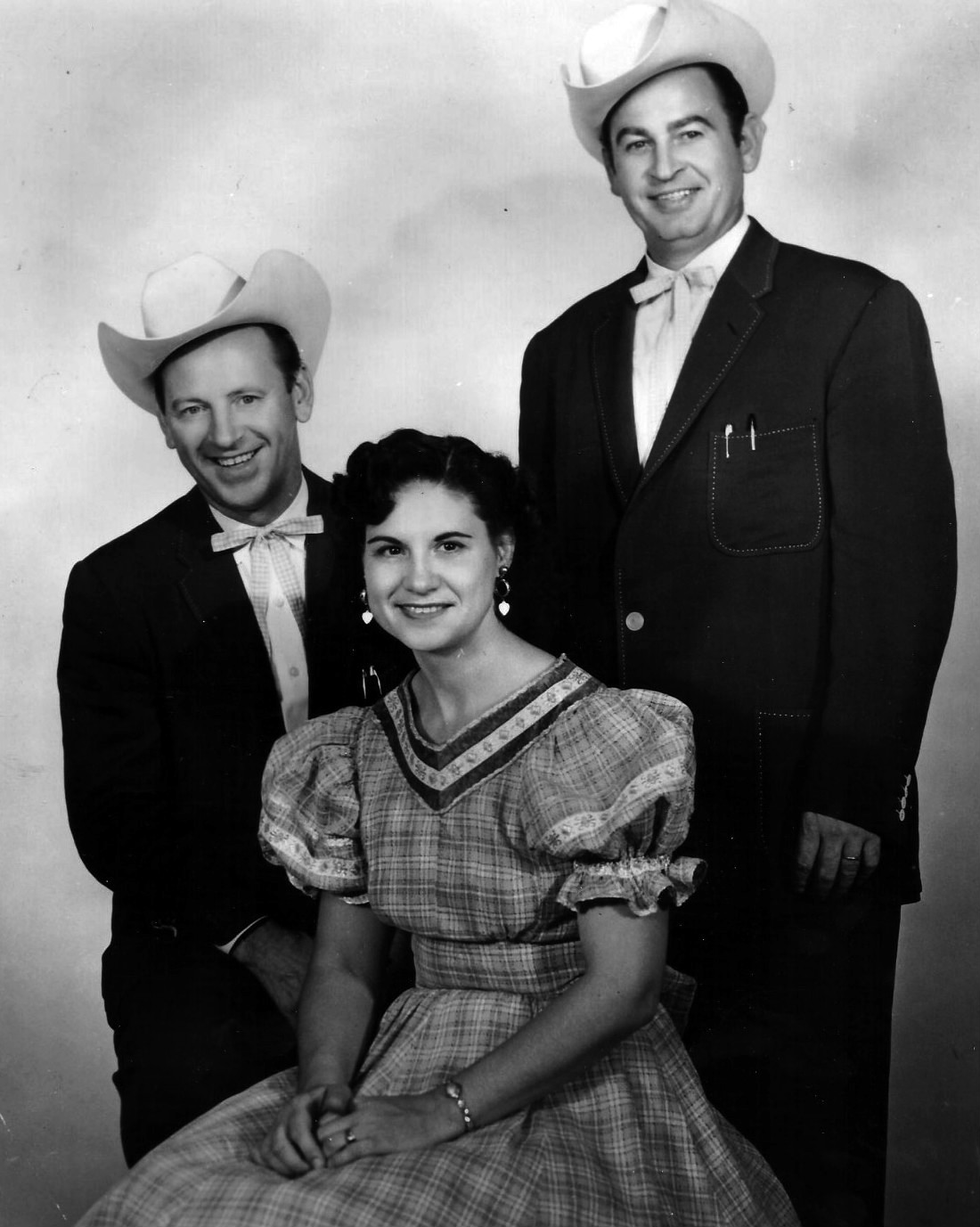
Johnnie & Jack topped the jockeys chart in June with "(Oh Baby Mine) I Get So Lonely". Also pictured is Johnnie's wife, Kitty Wells, who also reached number one in 1954.

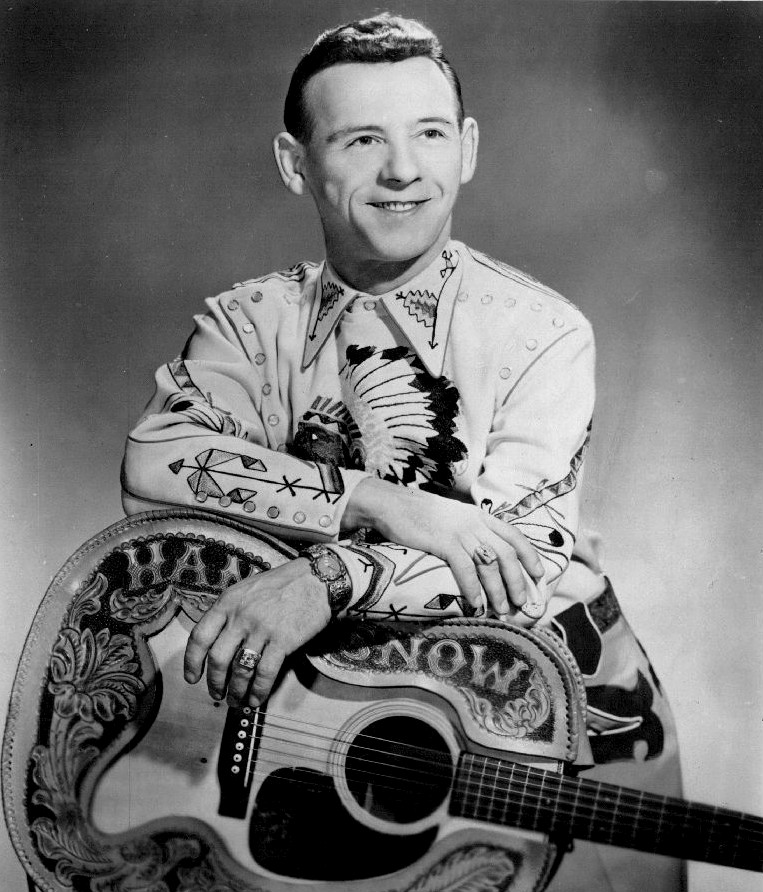
Hank Snow spent twenty consecutive weeks at number one on the best sellers chart with "I Don't Hurt Anymore".

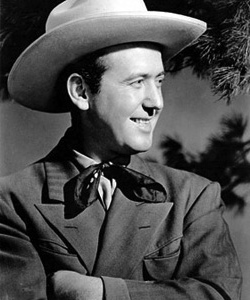
Red Foley collaborated with Kitty Wells on the song "One by One".

Chart history
Issue date	Juke Box		Best Sellers		Jockeys		Ref.
Issue date	Title	Artist(s)	Title	Artist(s)	Title	Artist(s)	Ref.
January 2	"Let Me Be The One"	Hank Locklin	"There Stands the Glass"	Webb Pierce	"There Stands the Glass"	Webb Pierce	
January 9^{[a]}	"There Stands the Glass"	Webb Pierce	"There Stands the Glass"	Webb Pierce	"Let Me Be the One"	Hank Locklin	
January 9^{[a]}	"There Stands the Glass"	Webb Pierce	"There Stands the Glass"	Webb Pierce	"Bimbo"	Jim Reeves	
January 16	"There Stands the Glass"	Webb Pierce	"There Stands the Glass"	Webb Pierce	"There Stands the Glass"	Webb Pierce	
January 23	"There Stands the Glass"	Webb Pierce	"There Stands the Glass"	Webb Pierce	"There Stands the Glass"	Webb Pierce	
January 30	"There Stands the Glass"	Webb Pierce	"There Stands the Glass"	Webb Pierce	"Bimbo"	Jim Reeves	
February 6	"There Stands the Glass"	Webb Pierce	"There Stands the Glass"	Webb Pierce	"There Stands the Glass"	Webb Pierce	
February 13	"Let Me Be The One"	Hank Locklin	"There Stands the Glass"	Webb Pierce	"There Stands the Glass"	Webb Pierce	
February 20^{[b]}	"There Stands the Glass"	Webb Pierce	"Slowly"	Webb Pierce	"Bimbo"	Jim Reeves	
February 20^{[b]}	"Wake Up, Irene"	Hank Thompson	"Slowly"	Webb Pierce	"Bimbo"	Jim Reeves	
February 27^{[b]}	"Wake Up, Irene"	Hank Thompson	"Slowly"	Webb Pierce	"Slowly"	Webb Pierce	
February 27^{[b]}	"There Stands the Glass"	Webb Pierce	"Slowly"	Webb Pierce	"Slowly"	Webb Pierce	
March 6^{[b]}	"There Stands the Glass"	Webb Pierce	"Slowly"	Webb Pierce	"Slowly"	Webb Pierce	
March 6^{[b]}	"Slowly"	Webb Pierce	"Slowly"	Webb Pierce	"Slowly"	Webb Pierce	
March 13	"Slowly"	Webb Pierce	"Slowly"	Webb Pierce	"Slowly"	Webb Pierce	
March 20	"Slowly"	Webb Pierce	"Slowly"	Webb Pierce	"Slowly"	Webb Pierce	
March 27	"Slowly"	Webb Pierce	"Slowly"	Webb Pierce	"Slowly"	Webb Pierce	
April 3	"Slowly"	Webb Pierce	"Slowly"	Webb Pierce	"Slowly"	Webb Pierce	
April 10	"Slowly"	Webb Pierce	"Slowly"	Webb Pierce	"Slowly"	Webb Pierce	
April 17	"Slowly"	Webb Pierce	"Slowly"	Webb Pierce	"Slowly"	Webb Pierce	
April 24	"Slowly"	Webb Pierce	"Slowly"	Webb Pierce	"Slowly"	Webb Pierce	
May 1	"Slowly"	Webb Pierce	"Slowly"	Webb Pierce	"Slowly"	Webb Pierce	
May 8	"Slowly"	Webb Pierce	"Slowly"	Webb Pierce	"Slowly"	Webb Pierce	
May 15	"I Really Don't Want to Know"	Eddy Arnold	"Slowly"	Webb Pierce	"Slowly"	Webb Pierce	
May 22	"Slowly"	Webb Pierce	"Slowly"	Webb Pierce	"Slowly"	Webb Pierce	
May 29	"Slowly"	Webb Pierce	"Slowly"	Webb Pierce	"Slowly"	Webb Pierce	
June 5	"Slowly"	Webb Pierce	"Slowly"	Webb Pierce	"Slowly"	Webb Pierce	
June 12	"Slowly"	Webb Pierce	"Slowly"	Webb Pierce	"(Oh Baby Mine) I Get So Lonely"	Johnnie & Jack	
June 19	"Slowly"	Webb Pierce	"I Don't Hurt Anymore"	Hank Snow	"(Oh Baby Mine) I Get So Lonely"	Johnnie & Jack	
June 26	"Slowly"	Webb Pierce	"I Don't Hurt Anymore"	Hank Snow	"I Don't Hurt Anymore"	Hank Snow	
July 3	"Slowly"	Webb Pierce	"I Don't Hurt Anymore"	Hank Snow	"Even Tho"	Webb Pierce	
July 10	"I Don't Hurt Anymore"	Hank Snow	"I Don't Hurt Anymore"	Hank Snow	"Even Tho"	Webb Pierce	
July 17	"I Don't Hurt Anymore"	Hank Snow	"I Don't Hurt Anymore"	Hank Snow	"I Don't Hurt Anymore"	Hank Snow	
July 24	"I Don't Hurt Anymore"	Hank Snow	"I Don't Hurt Anymore"	Hank Snow	"I Don't Hurt Anymore"	Hank Snow	
July 31	"One by One"	Kitty Wells and Red Foley	"I Don't Hurt Anymore"	Hank Snow	"I Don't Hurt Anymore"	Hank Snow	
August 7	"I Don't Hurt Anymore"	Hank Snow	"I Don't Hurt Anymore"	Hank Snow	"I Don't Hurt Anymore"	Hank Snow	
August 14	"I Don't Hurt Anymore"	Hank Snow	"I Don't Hurt Anymore"	Hank Snow	"I Don't Hurt Anymore"	Hank Snow	
August 21	"I Don't Hurt Anymore"	Hank Snow	"I Don't Hurt Anymore"	Hank Snow	"I Don't Hurt Anymore"	Hank Snow	
August 28	"I Don't Hurt Anymore"	Hank Snow	"I Don't Hurt Anymore"	Hank Snow	"I Don't Hurt Anymore"	Hank Snow	
September 4	"I Don't Hurt Anymore"	Hank Snow	"I Don't Hurt Anymore"	Hank Snow	"I Don't Hurt Anymore"	Hank Snow	
September 11	"I Don't Hurt Anymore"	Hank Snow	"I Don't Hurt Anymore"	Hank Snow	"I Don't Hurt Anymore"	Hank Snow	
September 18	"I Don't Hurt Anymore"	Hank Snow	"I Don't Hurt Anymore"	Hank Snow	"I Don't Hurt Anymore"	Hank Snow	
September 25	"I Don't Hurt Anymore"	Hank Snow	"I Don't Hurt Anymore"	Hank Snow	"I Don't Hurt Anymore"	Hank Snow	
October 2	"I Don't Hurt Anymore"	Hank Snow	"I Don't Hurt Anymore"	Hank Snow	"I Don't Hurt Anymore"	Hank Snow	
October 9	"I Don't Hurt Anymore"	Hank Snow	"I Don't Hurt Anymore"	Hank Snow	"I Don't Hurt Anymore"	Hank Snow	
October 16	"I Don't Hurt Anymore"	Hank Snow	"I Don't Hurt Anymore"	Hank Snow	"I Don't Hurt Anymore"	Hank Snow	
October 23	"I Don't Hurt Anymore"	Hank Snow	"I Don't Hurt Anymore"	Hank Snow	"I Don't Hurt Anymore"	Hank Snow	
October 30	"I Don't Hurt Anymore"	Hank Snow	"I Don't Hurt Anymore"	Hank Snow	"I Don't Hurt Anymore"	Hank Snow	
November 6	"I Don't Hurt Anymore"	Hank Snow	"More and More"	Webb Pierce	"More and More"	Webb Pierce	
November 13	"I Don't Hurt Anymore"	Hank Snow	"More and More"	Webb Pierce	"I Don't Hurt Anymore"	Hank Snow	
November 20	"I Don't Hurt Anymore"	Hank Snow	"More and More"	Webb Pierce	"More and More"	Webb Pierce	
November 27	"I Don't Hurt Anymore"	Hank Snow	"More and More"	Webb Pierce	"More and More"	Webb Pierce	
December 4	"More and More"	Webb Pierce	"More and More"	Webb Pierce	"More and More"	Webb Pierce	
December 11	"More and More"	Webb Pierce	"More and More"	Webb Pierce	"More and More"	Webb Pierce	
December 18	"More and More"	Webb Pierce	"More and More"	Webb Pierce	"More and More"	Webb Pierce	
December 25	"More and More"	Webb Pierce	"More and More"	Webb Pierce	"More and More"	Webb Pierce	

a. Two songs tied for number one on the jockeys chart.
b. Two songs tied for number one on the juke box chart.

== See also ==
- 1954 in country music
- List of artists who reached number one on the U.S. country chart
