= Billboard Top Country & Western Records of 1955 =

American music chart

Billboard Top Country & Western Records of 1955 is made up of three year-end charts compiled by Billboard magazine ranking the year's top country and western records based on record sales, disc jockey plays, and juke box plays.

Webb Pierce's "In the Jailhouse Now" ranked as the year's No. 1 song on all three charts. His record of "I Don't Care" ranked No. 2 on the disk jockey and juke box charts and No. 3 on the retail chart. In all, Pierce had four records that ranked in the top 10 on at least one of the year-end charts.

Kitty Wells' "Making Believe" ranked No. 2 on the year-end retail chart and No. 3 on the juke box chart. The year's other top hits included: (1) Carl Smith's "Loose Talk" which ranked No. 4 on all three charts; and (2) Porter Wagoner's "A Satisfied Mind" which ranked No. 3 on the disk jockey chart and No. 5 on the other two charts.

Retail	Disk jockey	Juke box	Title	Artist(s)	Label
1	1	1	"In the Jailhouse Now"	Webb Pierce	Decca
2	8	3	"Making Believe"	Kitty Wells	Decca
3	2	2	"I Don't Care"	Webb Pierce	Decca
4	4	4	"Loose Talk"	Carl Smith	Columbia
5	3	5	"A Satisfied Mind"	Porter Wagoner	RCA Victor
6	19	8	"The Cattle Call"	Eddy Arnold, Hugo Winterhalter	RCA Victor
7	5	6	"Live Fast, Love Hard, Die Young"	Faron Young	Capitol
8	9	10	"If You Ain't Lovin' (You Ain't Livin')"	Faron Young	Capitol
9	14	8	"Yellow Roses"	Hank Snow	RCA Victor
10	12	12	"I've Been Thinking"	Eddy Arnold	RCA Victor
11	17	7	"More and More"	Webb Pierce	Decca
12	7	13	"Love, Love, Love"	Webb Pierce	Decca
13	22	11	"A Satisfied Mind"	Red & Betty Foley	RCA Victor
14	NR	21	"Ballad of Davy Crockett"	Tennessee Ernie Ford	Capitol
15	16	19	"Just Call Me Lonesome"	Eddy Arnold	RCA Victor
16	15	20	"There She Goes"	Carl Smith	Columbia
17	NR	14	"Are You Mine?"	Ginny Wright, Tom Tall	Fabor
18	NR	18	"A Satisfied Mind"	Jean Shepard	Capitol
19	11	15	"Let Me Go, Lover"	Hank Snow	RCA Victor
20	10	16	"All Right"	Faron Young	Capitol
21	NR	NR	"Sixteen Tons"	Tennessee Ernie Ford	Capitol
22	NR	NR	"Kisses Never Lie"	Carl Smith	Columbia
23	13	22	"Hearts of Stone"	Red Foley	Decca
24	NR	NR	"This Ole House"	Stuart Hamblen	RCA Victor
25	NR	NR	"Kentuckian Song"	Eddy Arnold	RCA Victor
NR	NR	17	"Making Believe"	J. Work	Dot
NR	NR	19	"Just Call Me Lonesome"	Eddy Arnold	RCA Victor
NR	21	23	"Are You Mine?"	M. Lorrie, B. DeVal	Decca
NR	18	24	"Would You Mind?"	Hank Snow	RCA Victor
NR	NR	25	"I Don't Hurt Anymore"	Hank Snow	RCA Victor
NR	20	NR	"Cuzz You're So Sweet"	Simon Crum	Capitol
NR	23	NR	"That Do Make It So Nice"	Eddy Arnold	RCA Victor
NR	24	NR	"Yonder Comes a Sucker"	Jim Reeves	RCA Victor

== See also ==
- List of Billboard number-one country songs of 1955
- Billboard year-end top 30 singles of 1955
- 1955 in country music
