= There Stands the Glass (album) =

Studio album by Carl Smith
- Released: 1964
- Genre: Country
- Label: Columbia Records

There Stands the Glass is a studio album by country music singer Carl Smith. It was released in 1964 by Columbia Records (catalog no. CL-2173). The album consists of Smith's covers of songs made famous by Webb Pierce.

The album debuted on Billboard magazine's country album chart on June 20, 1964, peaked at No. 9, and remained on the chart for a total of 21 weeks.

AllMusic gave the album a rating of two stars. Critic Greg Adams wrote: "It might seem redundant to have one major star of hard honky tonk music cover the material of another, but Carl Smith's sound and phrasing is so different from Pierce, the results are entirely dissimilar."

== Track listing ==
Side A

1. "Slowly"
2. "Wondering"
3. "Love, Love, Love"
4. "Back Street Affair"
5. "So Used to Lovin' You"
6. "I'm Tired"

Side B

1. "There Stands the Glass"
2. "More and More"
3. "How Do You Talk to a Baby"
4. "Yes I Know Why"
5. "That Heart Belongs to Me"
6. "I Do Not Care"
