= The Tall, Tall Gentleman =

Studio album by Carl Smith
- Released: 1963
- Genre: Country
- Label: Columbia Records

The Tall, Tall Gentleman is a studio album by country music singer Carl Smith. It was released in 1963 by Columbia Records (catalog no. CL-2091).

The album debuted on Billboard magazine's country album chart on January 11, 1964, peaked at No. 12, and remained on the chart for a total of 11 weeks.

AllMusic gave the album a rating of two-and-a-half stars.

== Track listing ==
Side A

1. "Back Up Buddy"
2. "This Orchid Means Goodbye"
3. "Loose Talk"
4. "No More Loose Talkin'"
5. "The Tall, Tall Gentleman"
6. "Wait a Little Longer, Please Jesus"

Side B

1. "(When You Feel Like You're In Love) Don't Just Stand There"
2. "Try to Take It Like a Man"
3. "Before I Met You"
4. "Live for Tomorrow"
5. "Air Mail to Heaven"
6. "I Dreamed of the Old Rugged Cross"
