= Knee Deep in Blue Grass =

Studio album by Bill Monroe and his Blue Grass Boys
- Released: June 23, 1958
- Recorded: May–December 1957
- Studio: Bradley Film & Recording Studio (Nashville, Tennessee)
- Genre: Bluegrass
- Length: 29:37
- Label: Decca
- Producer: Paul Cohen

Bill Monroe chronology
Knee Deep in Blue Grass (1958)	I Saw the Light (1958)

Singles from Knee Deep in Blue Grass
- 1. "Molly and Tenbrooks" Released: November 4, 1957; 2. "Sally-Jo" Released: May 5, 1958

Knee Deep in Blue Grass is the first studio album by American bluegrass musician Bill Monroe and his band, the Blue Grass Boys. Released on June 23, 1958, by Decca Records, it features 12 songs recorded across three sessions at Bradley Film & Recording Studio in Nashville, Tennessee during May and December 1957, produced by Paul Cohen. Prior to the album's release, "Molly and Tenbrooks" and "Sally-Jo" were issued as singles in November 1957 and May 1958, respectively.

== Background ==
After a break from recording of "nearly a year and a half", Bill Monroe and the Blue Grass Boys recorded renditions of Jimmy Newman's "Fallen Star" and Jim Reeves' "Four Walls" on April 20, 1957, which were issued together as a single by Decca Records on May 13. The recordings featured a lineup of Joe Stuart on guitar, Don Stover on banjo, Gordon Terry and Tommy Jackson on fiddles, and Bessie Lee Mauldin on bass. Decca subsequently arranged for Monroe and his band to record their first album, with the first session scheduled for the day after the single's release, May 14, featuring the same lineup with the addition of third fiddler Dale Potter.

== Recording ==
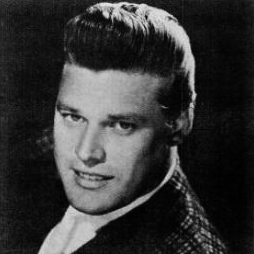
Nine of the twelve songs on Knee Deep in Blue Grass feature Gordon Terry on fiddle.

First session: May 14, 1957

The first song recorded during the first session for the album was "A Good Woman's Love", written by Cy Coben and originally recorded the year before by Hank Locklin. The second song was another written by Jimmy Newman, "Cry, Cry Darling", which he himself had recorded and released in 1954. The third and final track the band recorded on May 14 was "I'm Sittin' on Top of the World", written by Walter Vinson and Lonnie Chatmon of the blues band Mississippi Sheiks in the 1930s — when the album was printed, however, Decca mistakenly credited the track to Ray Henderson, Joe Young and Sam Lewis, confusing it with the pop song of the same name.

Second session: May 15, 1957

The second session for Knee Deep in Blue Grass took place the next day. Tommy Jackson was unable to take part, so Joe Stuart switched to fiddle and former Blue Grass Boys member Leslie Sandy — who had recently returned to Nashville hoping to rejoin the band — stepped in on guitar. Decca had tasked the outfit with recording six songs during this session, so the performers worked "an hour or so longer" than the normal three-hour limit imposed by musicians' union regulations to finish, with each paid for two sessions. Even with the extension, banjo player Don Stover recalls that the band needed to work quickly to finish, with "no rehearsing going on".

During the first half of the session, the band recorded two songs written by Joe Ahr — "Out in the Cold World" and "Roane County Prison" — and the Bill Monroe original "Goodbye Old Pal", which had originally been recorded in 1945 as the B-side to "Blue Moon of Kentucky". The second half of the session saw the tracking of a third Ahr composition, "In Despair", as well as a re-recording of the traditional "Molly and Tenbrooks" the Blue Grass Boys had originally recorded in 1947, and a final Monroe original, "Come Back to Me in My Dreams". "In Despair" was the only song recorded for the album which featured a vocal trio (Monroe performed solo vocal on the remainder), with the chorus featuring Stover singing lead, Monroe singing tenor and Stuart singing baritone.

Third session: December 15, 1957

The third and final session for Knee Deep in Blue Grass did not take place for another seven months. During the intervening period, the lineup of the Blue Grass Boys had changed a few times: Sandy left shortly after the May 15 session, Stover followed about a month later, fiddler Kenny Baker replaced Gordon Terry later in the summer, and the role of guitarist had changed several times. For the December 15 session, Monroe, Baker, Stuart (on fiddle) and Mauldin were joined by guitarist Doug Kershaw and banjo player Jimmy Elrod. The first track recorded was "Sally-Jo", which had been written the day before by Kershaw and heard backstage at the Grand Ole Opry by Monroe, who asked to record it. This was followed by Lester Blackwell's "Brand New Shoes" and Stuart's own composition, "A Lonesome Road (To Travel)".

== Release ==
In between the May and December sessions, Decca issued the recording of "Molly and Tenbrooks" as a single, backed with "I'm Sittin' on Top of the World", on November 4, 1957. Future Blue Grass Boys member and Monroe biographer claims the label made the decision to release the single to promote the album in competition with Mac Wiseman's forthcoming release 'Tis Sweet to Be Remembered. A second single — "Sally-Jo" backed with "Brand New Shoes", both from the December session — was released on May 5, 1958. Knee Deep in Blue Grass was finally released on June 23, 1958 — more than six months after its completion. The title was reportedly inspired by the 1957 single "Knee Deep in the Blues" by Marty Robbins. Alongside the album, Decca also issued the first Blue Grass Boys extended play, featuring four tracks from the album: "Cry, Cry Darling", "Roane County Prison", "Molly and Tenbrooks" and "Brand New Shoes". Leslie Sandy was mis-credited on the album sleeve as "Lester Sandy".

Knee Deep in Blue Grass was reissued by Vocalion Records on December 30, 1969, under the title Blue Grass Style, with "A Lonesome Road (To Travel)" and "Molly and Tenbrooks" removed.

== Track listing ==
Knee Deep in Blue Grass track listing
No.	Title	Writer(s)	Length
1.	"Cry, Cry Darling" (recorded May 14, 1957)	Jimmy C. Newman	2:24
2.	"Roane County Prison" (recorded May 15, 1957)	Joe Ahr	3:11
3.	"Goodbye, Old Pal" (recorded May 15, 1957)	Bill Monroe	2:06
4.	"Out in the Cold World" (recorded May 15, 1957)	Ahr	2:36
5.	"A Good Woman's Love" (recorded May 14, 1957)	Cy Coben	2:22
6.	"In Despair" (recorded May 15, 1957)	Ahr	2:17
7.	"Come Back to Me in My Dreams" (recorded May 15, 1957)	Monroe	2:25
8.	"A Lonesome Road (To Travel)" (recorded December 15, 1957)	Joe Stuart	2:40
9.	"Sally-Jo" (recorded December 15, 1957)	Rusty Kershaw; Doug Kershaw	2:39
10.	"Brand New Shoes" (recorded December 15, 1957)	Lester Blackwell	2:12
11.	"Molly and Tenbrooks" (recorded May 15, 1957)	Traditional, arr. Monroe	2:19
12.	"I'm Sittin' on Top of the World" (recorded May 14, 1957)	Walter Vinson; Lonnie Chatmon	2:21
Total length:			29:37

== Personnel ==
Tracks 1, 5 and 12 (recorded May 14, 1957)

- Bill Monroe — mandolin, vocals
- Joe Stuart — guitar
- Don Stover — banjo
- Gordon Terry — fiddle
- Tommy Jackson — fiddle
- Dale Potter — fiddle
- Bessie Lee Mauldin — string bass

Tracks 2–4, 6, 7 and 11 (recorded May 15, 1957)

- Bill Monroe — mandolin, lead and tenor (track 6 chorus) vocals
- Leslie Sandy — guitar
- Don Stover — banjo, lead vocals (track 6 chorus)
- Gordon Terry — fiddle
- Joe Stuart — fiddle, baritone vocals (track 6)
- Dale Potter — fiddle
- Bessie Lee Mauldin — string bass

Tracks 8–10 (recorded December 15, 1957)

- Bill Monroe — mandolin, vocals
- Doug Kershaw — guitar
- Jimmy Elrod — banjo
- Joe Stuart — fiddle
- Kenny Baker — fiddle
- Bessie Lee Mauldin — string bass

== Bibliography ==
- Ewing, Tom (September 7, 2018), Bill Monroe: The Life and Music of the Blue Grass Man (Music in American Life), Champaign, Illinois: University of Illinois Press, ISBN 978-0252041891
