= Man with a Plan =

Man with a Plan may refer to:

- Man with a Plan (film), a 1996 independent satire
- Man with a Plan (TV series), a 2016 television sitcom starring Matt LeBlanc
- "Man with a Plan", a 2013 television episode of Mad Men
- Man with a Plan (Carl Smith album), 1966
- Man with a Plan (Dennis Robbins album), 1992
- Lincoln Loud, protagonist of The Loud House
