= Go, Boy Go =

Single by Carl Smith

from the album Carl Smith's Best
- B-side: "If You Saw Her Through My Eyes (You'd See Her Differently)"
- Released: 1954
- Recorded: 1954
- Genre: Country
- Length: 2:07
- Label: Columbia
- Songwriter: Floyd Wilson

Carl Smith singles chronology
"Back Up Buddy" (1954)	"Go, Boy Go" (1954)	"Loose Talk" (1954)

"Go, Boy Go" is a rockabilly song written by Floyd Wilson, performed by Carl Smith, and released on the Columbia label (catalog no. 21226). In August 1954, it peaked at No. 4 on the Billboard country and western chart. It was also ranked No. 29 on Billboard's 1954 year-end country and western retail chart. The "B" side to the original record was "If You Saw Her Through My Eyes (You'd See Her Differently)."

The song's lyrics are an attempt to teach the "tricks of the trade" to a boy. The singer advises the boy to hug her tight and whisper in her ear, "you're the one I love best." And when the time is right, he cautions the boy not to lose her by being "too slow." When she sends the signal, "go boy go."

The song was later included on various Carl Smith compilations, including "Carl Smith's Best" (1964) and "The Essential Carl Smith" (1991).

== See also ==
- Billboard Top Country & Western Records of 1954
