= Webb Pierce (1955 album) =

Studio album by Webb Pierce
- Released: October 1955
- Genre: Country
- Label: Decca

Webb Pierce chronology
Webb Pierce (1955)	The Wondering Boy (1956)

Webb Pierce is an album from honky-tonk singer Webb Pierce that was released in October 1955 on the Decca label (DL 8129). AllMusic gave the album four-and-a-half stars.

The album included eight songs that reached No. 1 on the Billboard country charts: "I'll Go On Alone", "I Haven't Got the Heart", "I'm Walking the Dog", "Even Tho", "In the Jailhouse Now", "Your Good for Nothing Heart", "More and More", and "I Don't Care".

== Track listing ==
Side A

1. "In the Jailhouse Now" (Jimmie Rodgers)
2. "More and More" (Merle Kilgore)
3. "Even Tho" (Curt Peeples, Webb Pierce, Willie Jones)
4. "Your Good for Nothing Heart" (Edward Scalzi, George Williams, Pat Noto, Webb Pierce)
5. "You're Not Mine Anymore" (Teddy Wilburn, Webb Pierce)
6. "I Haven't Got the Heart" (H. Winston, Webb Pierce)

Side B

1. "Sparkling Brown Eyes" (with the Wilburn Brothers) (Billy Cox)
2. "You Just Can't Be True" (Theodore Wilburn)
3. "New Silver Bells" (Owen Perry, Webb Pierce)
4. "I'm Walking the Dog" (Cliff and Tex Grimsley)
5. "I'll Go On Alone" (Marty Robbins)
6. "I Don't Care" (Cindy Walker, Webb Pierce)
