= Billboard year-end top 30 singles of 1954 =

Ranking of recorded music

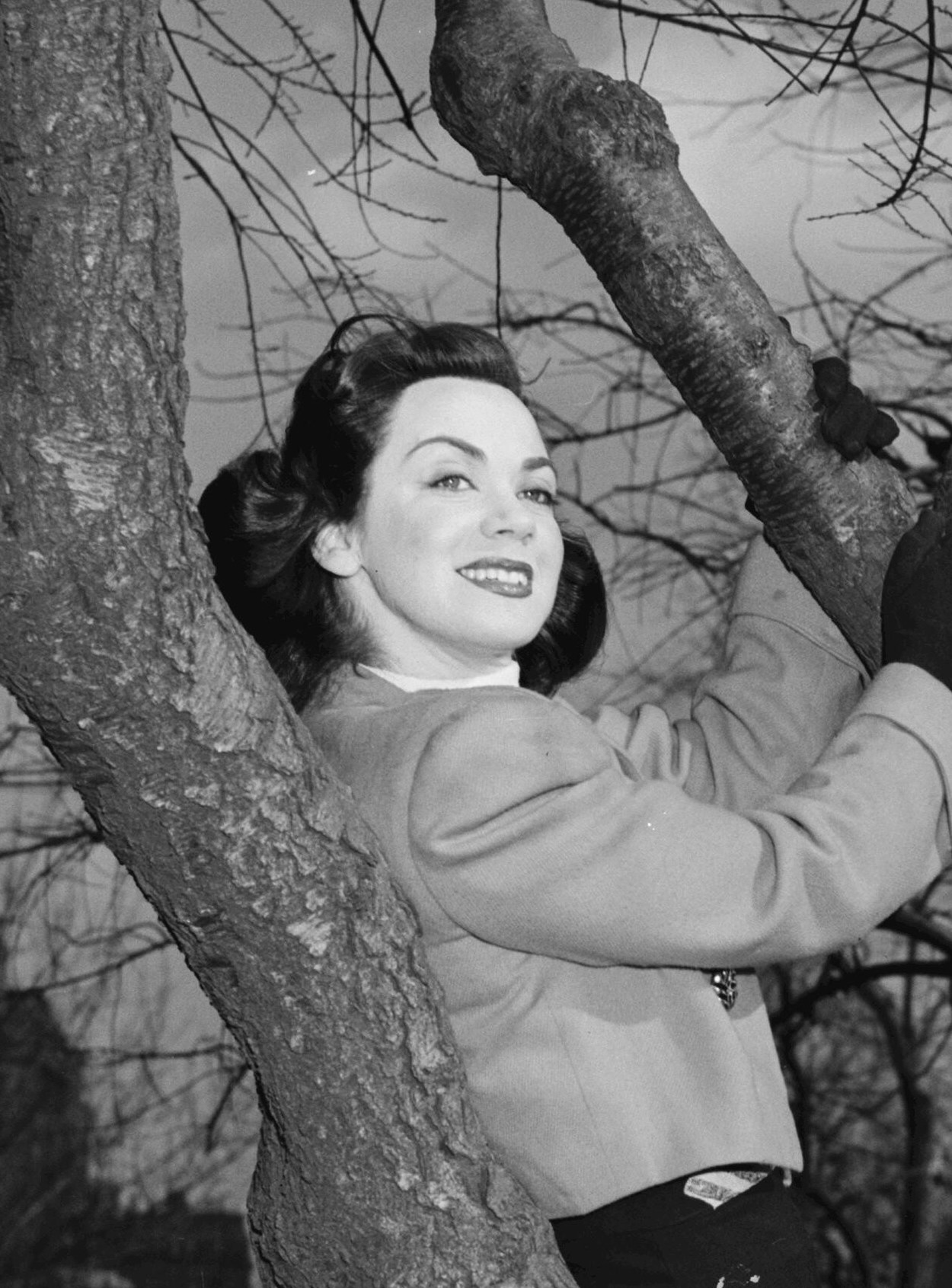
Kitty Kallen had two songs in the year-end top 30, including "Little Things Mean a Lot", the number one song of 1954.

This is a list of Billboard magazine's Top 30 popular songs of 1954 according to retail sales.

No.	Title	Artist(s)
1	"Little Things Mean a Lot"	Kitty Kallen with Jack Pleis
2	"Wanted"	Perry Como with Hugo Winterhalter
3	"Hey There"	Rosemary Clooney with Buddy Cole
4	"Sh-Boom"	The Crew-Cuts with David Carroll
5	"Make Love to Me"	Jo Stafford with Paul Weston
6	"Oh! My Pa-Pa"	Eddie Fisher with Hugo Winterhalter
7	"(Oh Baby Mine) I Get So Lonely"	The Four Knights
8	"Three Coins in the Fountain"	The Four Aces featuring Al Alberts and Jack Pleis
9	"Secret Love"	Doris Day with Ray Heindorf
10	"Hernando's Hideaway"	Archie Bleyer
11	"Young at Heart"	Frank Sinatra
12	"This Ole House"	Rosemary Clooney with Buddy Cole
13	"I Need You Now"	Eddie Fisher with Hugo Winterhalter
14	"Cross Over the Bridge"	Patti Page
15	"The Little Shoemaker"	The Gaylords
16	"That's Amore"	Dean Martin
17	"The Happy Wanderer"	Frank Weir
18	"Answer Me, My Love"	Nat King Cole
19	"Stranger in Paradise"	Tony Bennett
20	"If I Give My Heart to You"	Doris Day
21	"If You Love Me (Really Love Me)"	Kay Starr
22	"Skokiaan"	Ralph Marterie
23	"Hold My Hand"	Don Cornell
24	"Changing Partners"	Patti Page
25	"Papa Loves Mambo"	Perry Como
26	"Shake, Rattle and Roll"	Bill Haley & His Comets
27	"Rags to Riches"	Tony Bennett with Percy Faith
28	"In the Chapel in the Moonlight"	Kitty Kallen
29	"Stranger in Paradise"	The Four Aces
30	"Here"	Tony Martin

== See also ==
- 1954 in music
- List of Billboard number-one singles of 1954
