= If Teardrops Were Pennies =

1951 song

Single by Carl Smith

from the album Let's Live a Little
- Released: 1951
- Recorded: 1951
- Genre: Country
- Length: 2:30
- Label: Columbia
- Songwriter: Carl Butler

"If Teardrops Were Pennies" is a song written by Carl Butler that was first a hit for American country music artist Carl Smith. It was released by Columbia Records in 1951 and reached number 8 on the Billboard Hot Country Singles & Tracks chart. It was the B side of Mr. Moon, which reached number 4 on the Billboard Hot Country Singles & Tracks chart. The song also became a pop hit for another Columbia Records artist, Rosemary Clooney, in 1951, reaching number 24 as the B side to the single "I'm Waiting Just for You."

The song has been covered by numerous artists including Kitty Wells and Loretta Lynn and was a hit for country music duo Porter Wagoner and Dolly Parton in 1973.

== Chart performance ==
Chart (1951)	Peak position
US Hot Country Songs (Billboard)	8

Chart (1951)	Peak position
US Pop Airplay (Billboard)	24

== Porter Wagoner and Dolly Parton version ==
"If Teardrops Were Pennies"

Single by Porter Wagoner and Dolly Parton

from the album Love and Music
- B-side: "Gone Away"
- Released: 1973
- Genre: Country
- Length: 2:06
- Label: RCA Victor
- Songwriter: Carl Butler
- Producer: Bob Ferguson

Porter Wagoner and Dolly Parton singles chronology
"We Found It" (1973)	"If Teardrops Were Pennies" (1973)	"Please Don't Stop Loving Me" (1974)

=== Background and recording ===
"If Teardrops Were Pennies" had its greatest chart success as a duet by Porter Wagoner and Dolly Parton, whose version reached number 3 on the Hot Country Singles & Tracks chart in 1973. The song was released on June 4, 1973, as the only single from the album Love and Music and was produced by Bob Ferguson. The song was nominated for Best Country Vocal Performance by a Duo or Group at the 16th Annual Grammy Awards

=== Songwriter ===
Carl Butler is credited as the sole songwriter of "If Teardrops Were Pennies." However, Wayne Bledsoe and Bradley Reeves reported in The Knoxville News-Sentinel that the song had actually been written by Arthur Q. Smith, born James Arthur Pritchett, and sold to Butler. To support his alcoholism, Smith had sold many of his songs outright for 15 or 20 dollars, including songs that became hits such as "Wedding Bells", "Rainbow at Midnight", and "I Overlooked an Orchid". Smith also sold a 1/2 share of the song "I Wouldn't Change You If I Could", but ultimately received credit after his widow, Lillian Pritchett, sued the publisher after the song became a hit for Ricky Skaggs in 1983, twenty years after Smith's death.

== Other notable covers ==
- Kitty Wells included the song on her 1958 album Lonely Street.
- Loretta Lynn recorded the song for her 1966 album I Like 'Em Country.
- Stonewall Jackson recorded the song for his 1967 album Help Stamp Out Loneliness.
- The song was included as a bonus track on the Patty Loveless album Sleepless Nights.
- Carl and Pearl Butler included the song on their 1980 album Country We Love.
