= Why, Why =

Single by Carl Smith
- B-side: "Emotions"
- Released: 1957
- Recorded: 1957
- Genre: Country
- Length: 2:23
- Label: Columbia
- Songwriters: Wayne Walker, Mel Tillis

Carl Smith singles chronology
"Try to Take It Like a Man" (1957)	"Why, Why" (1957)	"Your Name Is Beautiful" (1958)

"Why, Why" is a song written by Wayne Walker and Mel Tillis, performed by Carl Smith, and released on the Columbia label. In September 1957, it entered Billboard magazine's country chart, peaked at No. 2, and remained on the chart for 19 weeks. In Billboard's annual poll of country music disc jockeys, it was rated No. 13 among the "Favorite C&W Records" of 1957. It was also ranked No. 18 on Billboard's 1954 year-end country and western chart tracking the number of plays by disc jockeys.

== See also ==
- Billboard Top Country & Western Records of 1954
