= Let's Live a Little =

Let's Live a Little may refer to:

- Let's Live a Little (film), a 1948 American romantic comedy film
- Let's Live a Little (album), a 1958 album by Carl Smith
- Let's Live a Little (song), a 1951 single by Carl Smith
