= I Love You (Ginny Wright and Jim Reeves song) =

Single by Ginny Wright, Jim Reeves
- B-side: "I Want You Yes (You Want Me No)"
- Released: November 1953
- Recorded: 1953
- Genre: Country
- Length: 2:30
- Label: Fabor
- Songwriter: B. Grimes

"I Love You" is a song written by B. Grimes, performed by Ginny Wright and Jim Reeves, and released on the Fabor label (catalog no. 101). In January 1954, it peaked at No. 3 on the Billboard country and western juke box chart and spent a total of 22 weeks on the charts. It was also ranked No. 27 on Billboard's 1954 year-end country and western retail sales chart.

== See also ==
- Billboard Top Country & Western Records of 1954
