= Hep Cat Baby =

Single by Eddy Arnold
- A-side: "This Is the Thanks I Get (For Loving You)"
- Released: July 17, 1954
- Recorded: 1954
- Genre: Country
- Length: 2:45
- Label: RCA Victor
- Songwriter: Cy Coben

Eddy Arnold singles chronology
"My Everything" (1954)	"Hep Cat Baby" (1954)	"Christmas Can't Be Far Away" (1966)

"Hep Cat Baby" is a country music song written by Cy Coben, sung by Eddy Arnold, and released in 1954 on the RCA Victor label. In August 1954, it reached No. 7 on the Billboard folk juke box chart. It was also ranked as the No. 25 record on the Billboard 1954 year-end folk juke box chart.

The song has been included on multiple Eddie Arnold albums and compilations, including Hep Cat Baby, There's Been a Change in Me (1951-1955) (2008), and The Complete US Chart Singles 1945-62 (2014).

== See also ==
- Billboard Top Country & Western Records of 1954
