= Don't Drop It =

Single by Terry Fell
- A-side: "Truck Driving Man"
- Released: April 24, 1954
- Recorded: 1954
- Genre: Country
- Length: 2:07
- Label: "X" (RCA)
- Songwriter: Terry Fell

"Don't Drop It" is a song written and performed by Terry Fell (backing by The Fellers) and released on the "X" (RCA) label (catalog no. X-0010). In August 1954, it peaked at No. 4 on the Billboard country and western juke box chart and spent a total of 11 weeks on the charts. It was also ranked No. 17 on Billboard's 1954 year-end country and western juke box chart.

== See also ==
- Billboard Top Country & Western Records of 1954
