= All Right (Faron Young song) =

Single by Faron Young
- B-side: "Go Back You Fool"
- Released: 1955
- Recorded: 1955
- Genre: Country
- Length: 2:22
- Label: Capitol
- Songwriter(s): Faron Young

"All Right" is a song written and performed by Faron Young and released on the Capitol label (catalog no. 3169). In August 1955, it peaked at No. 2 on Billboard's country and western disk jockey chart. It spent 28 weeks on the charts and was also ranked No. 10 on Billboard's 1955 year-end country and western disk jockey chart and No. 16 on the year-end juke box chart.

== See also ==
- Billboard Top Country & Western Records of 1955
