= Robert Yount =

American singer-songwriter

- Birth name: Robert Gene Yount
- Born: October 20, 1929; Oklahoma City, Oklahoma, U.S.
- Died: June 30, 2005 (aged 75); Oroville, California, U.S.
- Genres: Country
- Occupation: Singer-songwriter
- Instrument(s): Vocals, guitarist

Robert Gene Yount (October 20, 1929 – June 30, 2005) was an American musician, singer and songwriter in the country music genre.

He was born in Oklahoma City, Oklahoma. Between 1949 and 1954 Yount worked as a guitarist and songwriter for Eddie Miller. Together with Miller, he wrote the song "Release Me" for which he is best known. The song reached number 1 in the UK in a cover by Engelbert Humperdinck. Yount sometimes used the stage name, Bobby Gene. As they were working with Dub Williams, (a pseudonym for James Pebworth), Miller and Yount gave him one-third of the song.

In 1958, Yount signed away his royalty rights to W.S. Stevenson, better known as William McCall of Four Star Records. After the bankruptcy of Four Star's successor in interest, the copyright was acquired by Acuff-Ross Music. When the initial term of copyright ended in 1983, it was renewed for a second term. Between 1983 and 1985 Acuff-Rose paid royalties to Yount, until they were notified by the family of the deceased William McCall of the 1958 assignment. Acuff-Rose then suspended payments until the dispute between the claimants was resolved. On December 24, 1996 the United States courts of appeals, Ninth Circuit, upheld the claim of the McCalls.

Robert Yount died in Oroville, California at the age of 75.
