= Smith's the Name =

Studio album by Carl Smith
- Released: 1957
- Genre: Country
- Label: Columbia Records

Smith's the Name is a studio album by country music singer Carl Smith. It was released in 1957 by Columbia Records (catalog CL-1022).

In Billboard magazine's annual poll of country and western disc jockeys, it was ranked No. 6 among the "Favorite Country Music LPs" of 1957.

AllMusic gave the album a rating of four stars.

== Track listing ==
Side A

1. "San Antonio Rose"
2. "Time Changes Everything"
3. "Lovin' Is Livin'"
4. "Oh No!"
5. "If I Could Hold Back the Dawn"
6. "That's What You Think"

Side B

1. "Live and Let Live"
2. "If You Want It, I Got It"
3. "Please Come Back Home"
4. "Look What Thoughts Done to Me"
5. "The House that Love Built"
6. "Come Back to Me"
