= This Is the Thanks I Get (For Loving You) =

Single by Eddy Arnold
- Released: 1954
- Genre: Country
- Label: RCA Victor
- Songwriter(s): Tommy Dilbeck

"This Is the Thanks I Get (For Loving You)" is a song by Eddy Arnold. It was released in 1954 on the RCA Victor label (catalog no. 20-5805). It was written by Tommy Dilbeck. In August 1954, it peaked at No. 3 on the Billboard country and western chart. It was also ranked as the No. 12 record on Billboard's 1954 year-end country and western retail chart.

== See also ==
- Billboard Top Country & Western Records of 1954
