= As Far As I'm Concerned =

Single by Red Foley, Betty Foley
- A-side: "Tennessee Whistling Man"
- Released: February 1954
- Recorded: 1953
- Genre: Country
- Length: 2:34
- Label: Decca
- Songwriter: Dale Parker

"As Far As I'm Concerned" is a song written by Dale Parker, performed by Red Foley and Betty Foley, and released on the Capitol label (catalog no. 21226). In March 1954, it peaked at No. 8 on the Billboard country and western chart. It was also ranked No. 24 on Billboard's 1954 year-end country and western retail chart.

== See also ==
- Billboard Top Country & Western Records of 1954
