= Whatcha Gonna Do Now =

Single by Tommy Collins
- B-side: "You're for Me"
- Released: August 1, 1954
- Recorded: 1954
- Genre: Country
- Length: 2:40
- Label: Capitol
- Songwriter: Tommy Collins

"Whatcha Gonna Do Now" is a song written and performed by Tommy Collins and released on the Capitol label (catalog no. 2891). In September 1954, it peaked at No. 4 on the Billboard country and western charts and spent a total of 21 weeks on the charts. It was also ranked No. 28 on Billboard's 1954 year-end country and western retail chart.

== See also ==
- Billboard Top Country & Western Records of 1954
