= Ten Guitars =

Single by Engelbert Humperdinck
- A-side: "Release Me"
- Released: 1967
- Genre: Pop
- Length: 2:40
- Label: Decca
- Songwriter: Gordon Mills
- Producer: Ken Woodman

Engelbert Humperdinck singles chronology
"Dommage Dommage" (1966)	"Ten Guitars" (1967)	"There Goes My Everything" (1967)

"Ten Guitars" is a 1967 song by English singer Engelbert Humperdinck. It was the B-side to his single "Release Me". The song is especially well known in New Zealand, where it has become a beloved folk song and is considered by some to be the "unofficial national anthem" of New Zealand.

== Popularity in New Zealand ==
"Ten Guitars" was released as the B-side to Humperdinck's 1967 single "Release Me". While the A-side track was an international hit, in New Zealand radio programmers favoured "Ten Guitars" due to its upbeat sound and a guitar style that lent itself to the popular "Maori strum" technique.

The song had originally been popularised in New Zealand by Rotorua radio programmer Eddie O'Strange of 1YZ. This led to increased sales of the single and national popularity of the song, particularly as a singalong party number.

The song later became especially popular with Māori in the 1960s who had left their regional homes and moved to cities for work. The song was a reminder of life in their hometowns.

=== Cultural impact ===
Billy Connolly's 1975 album The Big Yin: Billy Connolly in Concert has a track called "Glasgow Accents/Nine and a Half Guitars" where the Big Yin explains how he's sick of having to sing the song in folk clubs.

The 1996 television documentary Ten Guitars looked at the history of the song and its impact on New Zealand culture. It featured cover versions of the song from prominent New Zealand musicians of the time, including Tim Finn and Neil Finn, the Topp Twins, Dalvanius Prime, Jan Hellriegel, Purest Form, Mika X and Moana Maniapoto.

In 1999, the New Zealand artist Michael Parekowhai created the sculptural work "Ten Guitars". It was made up of ten custom-built guitars inlaid with pāua shell designs of kowhaiwhai patterns. The work examines the role of Māori in New Zealand society, including the changing roles in the second half of the 20th century.

In 2012, an attempt to break the world record for the most number of guitarists playing at once was made in Kaikohe, New Zealand, with "Ten Guitars" as the selected song. The world record of 7273 was not broken, with approximately 50 guitarists showing up for the record attempt.

== Other versions ==
- Tom Jones (1967)
- John Hore & Howard Morrison (1967)
- Toni Williams (1969)
- Neil Reid (1971)
- The Clarendonians (1972)
- Bamboo (1989)
- Sten & Stanley - "Dansa en dans med mig" (1992)
- Tom Sharplin and Friends (2012)
- The Break (2013)
- Sol3 Mio (2013)
