= Are You Mine? =

"Are You Mine"

Single by Ginny Wright, Tom Tall
- A-side: "I've Got Somebody New"
- Released: 1955
- Recorded: 1954
- Genre: Country
- Length: 2:37
- Label: Fabor
- Songwriter(s): Don Grashey, James Amadeo, Myrna Lorrie
- Producer(s): Fabor Robinson

"Are You Mine" is a song written by Don Grashey, James Amadeo, and Myrna Lorrie, performed by Ginny Wright and Tom Tall, and released on the Fabor label (catalog no. 117). In October 1955, it peaked at No. 2 on Billboard's country and western disk jockey chart. It spent 26 weeks on the charts and was also ranked No. 14 on Billboard's 1955 year-end country and western juke box chart and No. 17 on the year-end retail chart.

== See also ==
- Billboard Top Country & Western Records of 1955
