= You Better Not Do That =

Single by Tommy Collins
- B-side: "High on a Hilltop"
- Released: January 5, 1954
- Recorded: 1953
- Genre: Country
- Length: 2:27
- Label: Capitol
- Songwriter: Tommy Collins

"You Better Not Do That" is a song written and sung by Tommy Collins. It was released in 1954 on the Capitol label (catalog no. C-1301). In February 1954, it peaked at No. 2 on the Billboard country and western chart. It was also ranked as the No. 7 record on the Billboard 1954 year-end country and western retail and juke box charts.

== See also ==
- Billboard Top Country & Western Records of 1954
