= If You Don't Someone Else Will =

Single by Jimmy & Johnny
- B-side: "I'm Beginning to Remember"
- Released: August 1954
- Recorded: 1954
- Genre: Country
- Length: 2:21
- Label: Chess
- Songwriter: "Country" Johnny Mathis

"If You Don't Someone Else Will" is a song written by "Country" Johnny Mathis, sung by Jimmy & Johnny, and released on the Chess label (catalog no. 4859). In September 1954, it peaked at No. 3 on the Billboard country and western juke box chart. It was also ranked No. 22 on Billboard's 1954 year-end country and western retail chart.

== See also ==
- Billboard Top Country & Western Records of 1954
