= Wake Up Irene =

Single by Hank Thompson and His Brazos Valley Boys
- Released: 1954
- Genre: Country
- Label: Capitol
- Songwriter(s): John Hathcock, Weldon Allard

"Wake Up Irene" is a parody song written by Johnny Hathcock and Weldon Allard, performed by Hank Thompson and His Brazos Valley Boys, and released in 1954 on the Capitol label (catalog no. 21226).

It was a parody of, and answer song to, "Goodnight, Irene". A recording by The Weavers of "Goodnight, Irene" was released in 1950 and spent 13 weeks at No. 1 on the United States pop chart.

The premise of "Wake Up, Irene" is that Irene was prevented from sleep by the steel guitars and everyone around the country singing goodnight to her for months and months. According to the song, Irene finally fell asleep, and there is not a thing that can wake her.

In May 1954, the song peaked at No. 2 on the Billboard country and western chart. It was also ranked No. 17 on Billboard's 1954 year-end country and western retail chart.

== See also ==
- Billboard Top Country & Western Records of 1954
