= You Are the One (Carl Smith song) =

Single by Carl Smith

from the album Greatest Hits
- B-side: "Doorstep to Heaven"
- Released: 1956
- Recorded: 1956
- Genre: Country
- Length: 2:08
- Label: Columbia
- Songwriter: Pat Patterson

Carl Smith singles chronology
"I've Changed" (1956)	"You Are the One" (1956)	"Doorstep to Heaven" (1956)

"You Are the One" is a song written by Pat Patterson. Separate versions of the song were released in 1956, first by Leon Payne on Starday Records and then by Carl Smith (with the Tunesmiths) on Columbia Records. Smith's version entered Billboard magazine's country charts in June 1956, peaked at No. 4 on the disc jockey chart (No. 5 juke box), and remained on the chart for 23 weeks.

The "B" side on the original records released by both Payne and Smith was "Doorstep to Heaven."

On its May 1956 release, Billboard included Smith's record in its "Spotlight" and wrote: "Here's a good pairing for the country warbler . . . Both are melodic and stylish ballads rendered in Smith's typical warm and haunting tones. Tho the top side has a more upbeat rhythm, both talk of love in a delicate, winning way. Watch 'em!"

Smith's daughter Carlene Carter, who was born the year the song was released, covered it on her 1990 album "I Fell in Love".
