= Looking Back to See =

Single by The Browns
- B-side: "Rio de Janeiro"
- Released: April 10, 1954
- Recorded: 1954
- Genre: Country
- Length: 2:19
- Label: Fabor
- Songwriters: Jim Ed Brown, Maxine Brown

The Browns singles chronology
"Looking Back to See" (1954)	"Why Am I Falling" (1954)

"Looking Back to See" is a song written and originally performed by Jim Ed Brown and Maxine Brown of The Browns. In June 1954, the Browns' version of the song reached No. 8 on the Billboard country and western chart.

The song was covered by Goldie Hill and Justin Tubb in a record released on the Decca label (catalog no. 29145). In July 1954, the Hill/Tubb version peaked at No. 4. The Hill/Tubb version was also ranked as the No. 8 record on Billboard's 1954 year-end country and western juke box chart.

== See also ==
- Billboard Top Country & Western Records of 1954
