= I've Been Thinking =

Single by Eddy Arnold
- B-side: "Don't Forget"
- Released: 1955
- Recorded: 1954
- Genre: Country
- Length: 2:04
- Label: RCA Victor
- Songwriter(s): Boudleaux Bryant

Eddy Arnold singles chronology
"Christmas Can't Be Far Away" (1954)	"I've Been Thinking" (1955)	"I Always Have Someone to Turn To" (1955)

"I've Been Thinking" is a song written by Boudleaux Bryant, performed by Eddy Arnold, and released on the RCA Victor label (catalog no. 20-6000). In January 1955, it peaked at No. 2 on Billboard's country and western juke box chart (No. 3 on the best seller chart). It spent 25 weeks on the charts and was also ranked No. 10 on Billboard's 1955 year-end country and western retail chart and No. 12 on the year-end juke box and disk jockey charts.

== See also ==
- Billboard Top Country & Western Records of 1955
