= Courtin' in the Rain =

Single by T. Texas Tyler
- B-side: "Old Blue"
- Released: June 17, 1954
- Recorded: 1954
- Genre: Country
- Length: 2:56
- Label: 4 Star
- Songwriter: T. Texas Tyler

"Courtin' in the Rain" is a song written and sung by T. Texas Tyler and released on the 4 Star label (catalog no. 1660). In July 1954, it peaked at No. 3 on the Billboard country and western chart. It was also ranked No. 12 on Billboard's 1954 year-end country and western juke box chart.

The lyrics describe a man walking the street in a heavy rain and encountering a pretty girl with packages in her arms. He offers to help the girl with the packages, and when they arrive at the fornt gate of her house, he asks her for a date. The song goes on to describe subsequent instances in which he asks for a kiss and then for her hand in marriage, ending with her father giving him permission to marry the girl.

The "B" side was the old folk song, "Old Blue".

== See also ==
- Billboard Top Country & Western Records of 1954
