= Yellow Roses (Hank Snow song) =

Single by Hank Snow

from the album The Last Ride
- A-side: "Would You Mind?"
- Released: 1955
- Recorded: 1955
- Genre: Country
- Length: 2:45
- Label: RCA Victor
- Songwriter(s): Ken Devine

Hank Snow singles chronology
"Let Me Go, Lover!" (1954)	"Yellow Roses" (1955)	"Cryin', Prayin', Waitin', Hopin'" (1955)

"Yellow Roses" is a song written by Ken Devine, performed by Hank Snow, and released on the RCA Victor label (catalog no. 20-6057). In April 1955, it peaked at No. 3 on Billboard's country and western charts. It spent 27 weeks on the chart and was also ranked No. 9 on Billboard's 1955 year-end country and western retail chart and No. 8 on the year-end juke box chart.

== See also ==
- Billboard Top Country & Western Records of 1955
