= Trademark (country song) =

Single by Carl Smith

from the album Satisfaction Guaranteed
- B-side: "Do I Like It?"
- Released: 1953
- Recorded: 1953
- Genre: Country
- Length: 2:15
- Label: Columbia
- Songwriters: Porter Wagoner, Gary Walker

Carl Smith singles chronology
"This Orchid Means Goodbye" (1953)	"Trademark" (1953)	"Do I Like It?" (1953)

"Trademark" is a song written by Porter Wagoner and Gary Walker. It was released as a single in 1953 by both Wagoner on RCA Victor, and by Carl Smith on Columbia Records (catalog No. 21119).

Smith's version entered Billboard magazine's country charts in 1953, peaked at No. 2 on the best seller chart in July, and remained on the chart for 16 weeks. It reached No. 1 in record sales in Nashville in June 1953. It also reached No. 1 in Cincinnati and New Orleans in August 1953.

Mandy Barnett released a version of the song on her 1999 album "I've Got a Right to Cry."
