= There Stands the Glass =

Single by Webb Pierce
- A-side: "I'm Walking the Dog"
- Released: September 1953
- Studio: Bradley Studios, Nashville, Tennessee
- Genre: Country
- Length: 2:27
- Label: Decca
- Songwriters: Russ Hull; Mary Jean Shurtz; Audrey Grisham
- Producer: Owen Bradley

Webb Pierce singles chronology
"It's Been So Long" (1953)	"There Stands the Glass" (1953)	"Slowly" (1954)

"There Stands the Glass" is a country song written by Russ Hull, Mary Jean Shurtz, and Audrey Grisham. Originally recorded by Blaine Smith in 1952, it was a hit for Webb Pierce in 1953. It was Pierce's fifth release to hit number one on the country chart. It spent 27 weeks on the chart and was at the top for 12 weeks.

Bob Dylan wrote, "The star of this song is the empty bourbon glass, and it's built around the same kind of crack guitar sound as on a Hank Williams record, as well as the magical open-string, strummed chord."

In 2024, Rolling Stone ranked the song at number 127 on its 200 Greatest Country Songs of All Time ranking.

== Cover versions ==
- The song appears on the Carl Smith album There Stands the Glass, released in 1964.
- Scott McKenzie released a version of the song as a single in 1965.
- Conway Twitty covered this song in 1966.
- Wanda Jackson covered this song on her 1968 album Cream of the Crop.
- Jerry Lee Lewis recorded the song in 1969.
- In 1973, singer Johnny Bush peaked at number 34 on the US country chart and number 60 on the Canadian country chart with his version of the song.
- Loretta Lynn recorded the song in 1981 on her LP I Lie.
- Hoyt Axton covered the song in 1982.
- Ted Hawkins covered the song on his 1986 album On the Boardwalk, and in 1994 on The Next Hundred Years, his final recording.
- Jon Spencer Blues Explosion covered the song on the 1994 LP Mo' Width.
- Robert Gordon covered the song on his 1996 album The Humbler.
- Half Man Half Biscuit covered it in a 2002 Andy Kershaw session.
- Van Morrison recorded the song in 2006 on his CD Pay the Devil.
- Patty Loveless included her cover of the song in her 2008 album Sleepless Nights.
- Billy Childish and CTMF released the song as a single in 2013.
- The song is sampled in Sam Hunt's 2020 song "Hard to Forget".
- Marcus King covered it on a 1950 Fender Broadcaster in a 2025 session with Carter Vintage Guitars.
