= Just Call Me Lonesome (Eddy Arnold song) =

Single by Eddy Arnold
- A-side: "That Do Make It Nice"
- Published: October 23, 1953 Forrest Music Corp.
- Released: August 1955
- Genre: country
- Label: RCA 47-6198
- Songwriter: Rex Griffin

"Just Call Me Lonesome" is a song written by Rex Griffin and first recorded by Eddy Arnold in 1955, when it reached number two on the U.S. country singles chart. "Just Call Me Lonesome" subsequently appeared on albums by numerous recording artists:

- Wanda Jackson, Wanda Jackson (1958)
- Jim Reeves, Songs To Warm The Heart (1959)
- Red Foley, Kitty Wells, Kitty Wells' & Red Foley's Golden Hits (1961, compilation)
- Warren Smith, First Country Collection of Warren Smith (1961)
- Billy Walker, Everybody's Hits But Mine (1961)
- Slim Whitman, Just Call Me Lonesome (1961, reissued as Portrait)
- The Wilburn Brothers, City Limits (1961)
- Eddy Arnold, One More Time (1962)
- Ernest Tubb, Just Call Me Lonesome (1963)
- Jean Shepard, Lighthearted and Blue (1964)
- Ray Price, The Other Woman (1965)
- Dave Dudley, Lonelyville (1966)
- Don Gibson, Don Gibson With Spanish Guitars (1966)
- Elvis Presley, Clambake (1967, soundtrack)
- Bonnie Guitar, Night Train to Memphis (1969)

== See also ==
- 1955 in country music
