= Back Up Buddy =

Single by Carl Smith

from the album The Tall, Tall Gentleman
- B-side: "If You Tried as Hard to Love Me (As You Do to Break My Heart)"
- Released: 1954
- Recorded: 1954
- Genre: Country
- Length: 2:34
- Label: Columbia
- Songwriter(s): Boudleaux Bryant

Carl Smith singles chronology
"Dog-Gone It, Baby, I'm in Love" (1953)	"Back Up Buddy" (1954)	"Go, Boy Go" (1954)

"Back Up Buddy" is a song written by Boudleaux Bryant, sung by Carl Smith, and released on the Columbia label (catalog no. 21226). In May 1954, it peaked at No. 2 on the Billboard country and western chart. It was also ranked No. 17 on Billboard's 1954 year-end country and western retail chart.

== See also ==
- Billboard Top Country & Western Records of 1954
