= One by One (Kitty Wells and Red Foley song) =

Single by Kitty Wells, Red Foley
- B-side: "I'm a Stranger in My Home"
- Released: 1954
- Recorded: 1954
- Genre: Country
- Length: 2:53
- Label: Decca
- Songwriters: Johnny Wright, Jack Anglin, Jim Anglin

"One by One" is a song by Kitty Wells and Red Foley that was released in 1954 on the Decca label (catalog no. 29065-B). It was written by Johnny Wright, Jack Anglin, and Jim Anglin. In May 1954, it peaked at No. 1 on the Billboard country and western chart. It was also ranked as the No. 2 record on the Billboard 1954 year-end country and western retail and juke box charts.

== See also ==
- Billboard Top Country & Western Records of 1954
