= Even Tho (Webb Pierce song) =

Single by Webb Pierce
- B-side: "Sparkling Brown Eyes"
- Released: 1954
- Recorded: 1954
- Genre: Country
- Length: 2:45
- Label: Decca
- Songwriter(s): Willie Jones, Curt Peeples, Webb Pierce

Webb Pierce singles chronology
"Slowly" (1954)	"Even Tho" (1954)	"Sparkling Brown Eyes" (1954)

"Even Tho" is a country music song recorded by Webb Pierce. The song was co-written by Pierce, Willie Jones, and Curt Peeples. It was released in 1954 on the Decca label.

The song's lyrics tell of a lost love. Even though the singer's lover took the sunshine out of his heaven, and the twinkle out of his eye, he will always be in love with her.

In June 1954, the song reached the No. 1 spot on the Country & Western Records Most Played By Folk Disk Jockeys chart. It peaked at No. 2 on the Juke Box chart and No. 3 on the Best Seller chart. In Billboard's year-end country chart, it ranked as the No. 4 of 1954.

One year after the song's original release, it was included on the album, Webb Pierce. It has also been included on multiple compilations, including the Bear Family box set, The Wondering Boy (1951-1958) (1990), and King of the Honky-Tonk: From the Original Master Tapes (1994).

The song has also been covered by other artists, including Chet Atkins, Carl Mann, Connie Smith, Don Gibson, George Hamilton IV, and Matt King.

== Charts ==
Chart (1954)	Peak position
Most-Played Juke Box (Country & Western) Records	2
Best-Selling Retail Folk (Country & Western) Records	3
Country & Western Records Most Played By Folk Disk Jockeys	1
