= Garry Koehler =

Australian singer-songwriter (1955–2019)

Garry Koehler (23 May 1955 – 21 October 2019), born in Albury, was an Australian singer/songwriter, known for composing the 2006 hit, "The Man in the Picture", debut single for his award-winning band The Bobkatz. As co-founder, lead singer and guitarist with The Bobkatz who performed on the country music festival circuit, he was working on ideas for a new Bobkatz album when he died.

== Awards ==
=== Tamworth Songwriters Awards ===
The Tamworth Songwriters Association (TSA) is an annual songwriting contest for original country songs, awarded in January at the Tamworth Country Music Festival. They commenced in 1986. Garry Koehler won four awards in that time.

Year	Nominee / work	Award	Result (wins only)
2010	"The Writer" by Garry Koehler	Contemporary Song of the Year	Won
2010	"The Writer" by Garry Koehler	Country Song of the Year	Won
2016	"Spirit of the Frontier" by Garry Koehler	Open Traditional Song of the Year	Won
2016	"No White Card" by Garry Koehler	Open Contemporary Song of the Year	Won
