= Cry, Cry, Darling =

1954 single by Jimmy C. Newman

Single by Jimmy C. Newman
- B-side: "You Didn't Have to Go"
- Released: May 1954
- Genre: Country
- Length: 2:41
- Label: Dot
- Songwriters: Jimmy C. Newman, J. D. Miller

"Cry, Cry, Darling" is a song written by Jimmy C. Newman and J. D. "Jay" Miller, performed by Newman, and released on the Dot label (catalog no. 1195). It was produced by Shreveport music shop owner, Stan Lewis.

In May 1954, it peaked at No. 4 on the Billboard country and western juke box chart and spent a total of 11 weeks on the charts. It was also ranked No. 24 on Billboard's 1954 year-end country and western juke box chart.

It was Newman's first hit and won him a regular role on the Louisiana Hayride television show.

== See also ==
- Billboard Top Country & Western Records of 1954
