= The Four Knights =

American band

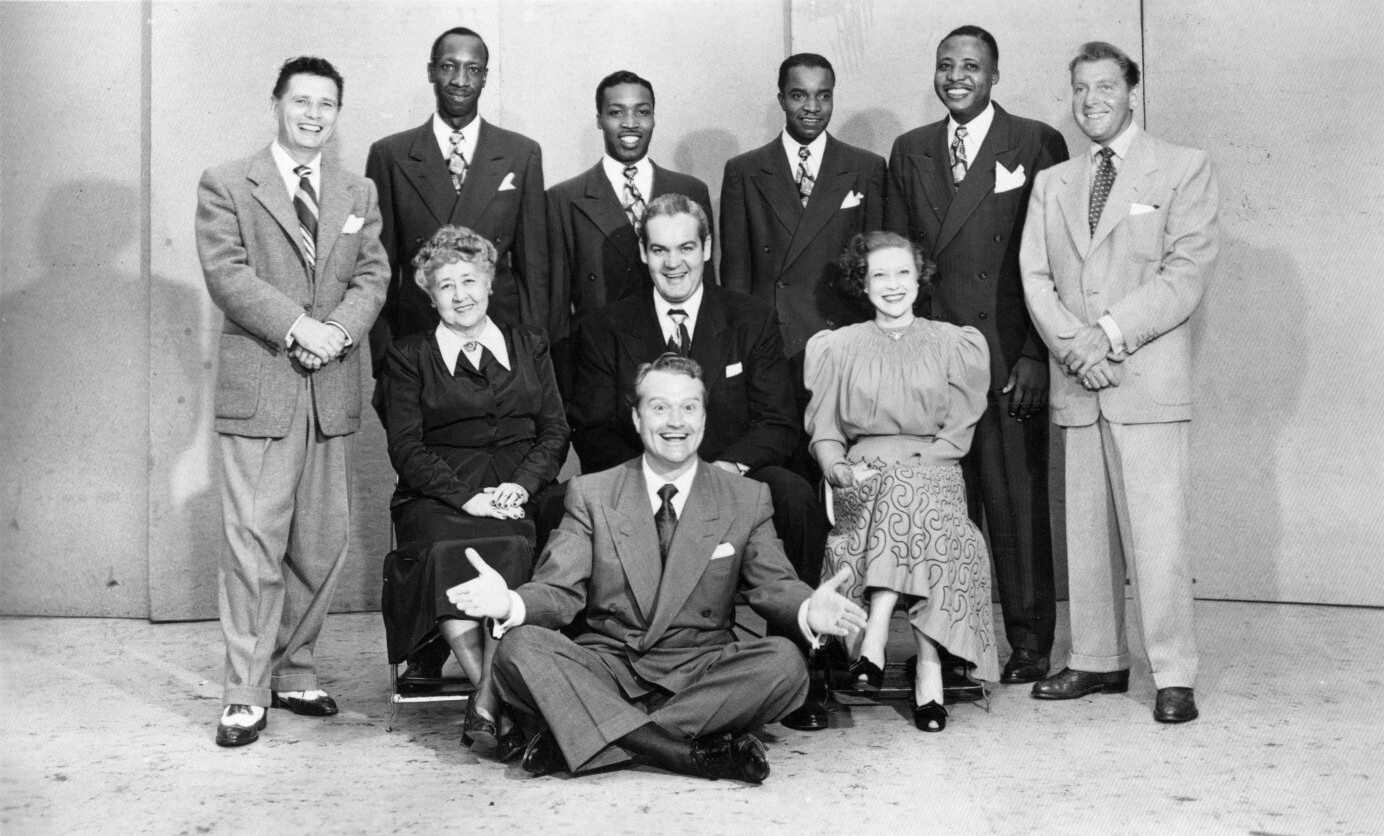
- Photo of 1948 Raleigh Cigarettes Program cast. The Four Knights are at the center of the back row, standing.

Background information
- Origin: Charlotte, North Carolina
- Genres: gospel music, vocal pop, doo-wop
- Years active: 1943-66
- Labels: Decca, Coral, Capitol
- Past members: Gene Alford; Oscar Broadway; Clarence Dixon; John Wallace; George Vereen; Clifford Holland

The Four Knights were an American vocal group from Charlotte, North Carolina, United States. Their 1954 hit, "I Get So Lonely When I Dream About You (Oh Baby Mine)", sold over one million copies and was awarded a gold disc.

== Career ==
The group was formed in 1943, with an original membership of Gene Alford (lead tenor), Oscar Broadway (bass), Clarence Dixon (baritone), and John Wallace (tenor, guitar). This line-up remained the same for much of the band's career. They first sang under the name Southland Jubilee Singers, and performed gospel music as well as vocal pop and doo-wop numbers. Their first professional job came in 1944 on WSDC radio station, an NBC subsidiary based in Charlotte. Soon after they became featured performers on the program Carolina Hayride, broadcast on CBS affiliate WBT. They recorded transcription discs for Langworth Records in the middle of the decade and changed their name to The Four Knights in 1945.

Later in 1945, the group moved to New York, where they appeared on Arthur Godfrey's radio show. They signed with Decca Records in 1946, releasing four singles over the next two years. They appeared on Red Skelton's radio program through most of 1948, and toured with Bill "Bojangles" Robinson. In 1949, they released two more singles on the Decca subsidiary Coral Records.

The group lost its recording contract with Skelton in 1950, when its manager had an asking price for the Knights' services which was above Skelton's show's budget. The manager broke the contract rather than try to reach a compromise with the program. The group fired him for this, since they had now lost a major source of exposure. They signed to Capitol Records the following year, where they would remain for six years and some 40 single releases, along with two LPs and three EPs. The 1951 release "I Love the Sunshine of Your Smile" hit No. 23 on the U.S. pop chart. As television became more widespread, they renewed their contract with Skelton for his TV show and also appeared on The Ed Sullivan Show.

Their 1954 hit, "I Get So Lonely When I Dream About You (Oh Baby Mine)", went to No. 3 on the charts in the U.S. and was their biggest success in America, selling over one million copies globally, and was awarded a gold disc. They had several other charting releases in the early 1950s. Under the name "Oh Baby Mine (I Get So Lonely)", the song also went to No. 5 in the UK Singles Chart that year. The group accompanied Nat King Cole on his hits "My Personal Possession" and "That's All There Is to That".

Gene Alford had to leave the group due to his worsening epilepsy, and was replaced by George Vereen and then Clifford Holland (formerly of the Delta Rhythm Boys). Alford died in 1960.

In 1957, the group re-signed with Coral, releasing four further singles and two LPs. Their last hit was "Oh Falling Star" in 1959, which peaked at No. 83. They released a few further singles on minor labels into the 1960s but had essentially quit the music industry by the middle of the decade. Three years after Alford's death, Clarence Dixon left the group; in 1966, it was disbanded. John Wallace died in 1978 and both Dixon and Broadway retired to the Los Angeles area. Broadway died in 1978 and Dixon died in 1992.
