= Mr. Moon (Carl Smith song) =

Single by Carl Smith

from the album Let's Live a Little
- B-side: "If Teardrops Were Pennies"
- Released: 1951
- Recorded: 1951
- Genre: Country
- Length: 2:59
- Label: Columbia
- Songwriters: Autry Inman, Carl Smith

Carl Smith singles chronology
"There's Nothing as Sweet as My Baby" (1951)	"Mr. Moon" (1951)	"If Teardrops Were Pennies" (1951)

"Mr. Moon" is a country music song written by Autry Inman and Carl Smith, recorded by Smith, and released on the Columbia label. In August 1951, it reached No. 4 on the country charts. It spent 17 weeks on the charts in the United States and was the No. 20 best selling country record of 1951. The B side, If Teardrops Were Pennies, was also a hit, reaching number 8 on the Billboard Hot Country Singles & Tracks chart.

== See also ==
- List of Billboard Top Country & Western Records of 1951
