= Man with a Plan (Carl Smith album) =

Studio album by Carl Smith
- Released: 1966
- Genre: Country
- Label: Columbia Records
- Producer: Don Law, Frank Jones

Man with a Plan is a studio album by country music singer Carl Smith. It was released in 1966 by Columbia Records (catalog no. CS-9301). The album was produced by Don Law and Frank Jones.

The album debuted on Billboard magazine's country album chart on August 13, 1966, peaked at No. 18, and remained on the chart for a total of 21 weeks.

AllMusic gave the album a rating of three stars. Critic Greg Adams cited the title track, "Man with a Plan" as one of Smith's best efforts of the period, "a playfully boastful number with Jimmy Dean-style production."

== Track listing ==
Side A

1. "Man with a Plan"
2. "Who Do I Think I Am"
3. "Don't Let Her"
4. "I'll Go Stepping Too"
5. "How Do You Talk to a Baby"
6. "The Bottle Is Just Fooling You"

Side B

1. "Steppin' Out"
2. "Tragic Romance"
3. "Mommy Please Stay Home with Me"
4. "Bouquet of Roses"
5. "Beautiful Wings"
