= Let's Live a Little (album) =

Studio album by Carl Smith
- Released: 1958
- Genre: Country
- Label: Columbia Records

Let's Live a Little is a studio album by country music singer Carl Smith. It was released in 1958 by Columbia Records (catalog no. CL-1172).

In Billboard magazine's annual poll of country and western disc jockeys, it was ranked No. 14 among the "Favorite Country Music LPs" of 1958.

AllMusic gave the album a rating of four stars.

== Track listing ==
Side A

1. "Let's Live a Little"
2. "Mr. Moon"
3. "Night Train to Memphis"
4. "Slowly"
5. "Hang Your Head in Shame"
6. "The Best Years of Your Life"

Side B

1. "If Teardrops Were Pennies"
2. "More and More"
3. "Sweet Little Miss Blue Eyes"
4. "Honky-Tonk Man"
5. "I Love You a Thousand Ways"
6. "I Overlooked an Orchid (While Looking for a Rose)"
