= Tom Tall =

American singer (1937–2013)

- Born: Tommie Lee Guthrie; December 27, 1937; Amarillo, Texas, U.S.
- Died: June 14, 2013 (aged 75) Las Vegas, Nevada, U.S.
- Genres: Country, rockabilly
- Occupation: Singer

Tommie Lee Guthrie (December 27, 1937 – June 14, 2013), known professionally as Tom Tall, was an American rockabilly singer popular in the 1950s.

== Biography ==
He was born in Amarillo, Texas and discovered at a talent show by record label owner Fabor Robison. He often sang duets with Ginny Wright, and later recorded for Crest and Decca Records where he met Eddie Cochran, a session musician for the label.

In the 1960s, he was on the Chart label and had a comeback hit with Wright. While he was with Chart, Tall made a series of singles including a song called "Walk Tall" which was tailor-made because of his professional name. It was picked up in the United Kingdom by Irish singer Val Doonican, who made the top five with the song.

Tall retired in Los Angeles, where he was rediscovered by the German label Bear Family Records, which issued albums in the 1980s by Tall and Wright. A recent CD by Bear Family was shared equally between both artists.

Tom Tall died on June 14, 2013, at age 75 in Las Vegas, Nevada.

== Singles ==
Year	Single	Chart Positions	
Year	Single	US Country	Label
1955	"Are You Mine?" (Ginny Wright & Tom Tall)	2	Fabor
1964	"Bad, Bad Tuesday"	25	Petal
