= Jimmy Heap =

American country musician

Jimmy Heap (March 3, 1922 - December 3, 1977) was an American country musician who was popular in the 1950s. He was the original artist for Release Me and "The Wild Side of Life".

== Biography ==
Jimmy Heap was born in Taylor, Texas on March 3, 1922.

Heap became interested in music when musician "Slim" Gensler would stop at the gas station where Heap worked and play his guitar.

He was enlisted in the United States Army Air Corps, where he was stationed in Sedalia, Missouri. It was here he met his future wife. After his military service ended, he formed the Melody Masters, which included Horace Barnett, Arlie Carter, Bill Glendining, and Louie Rincon. Starting 1948 they had a radio show on KTAE (AM). The group made their first records for Lasso Records of Austin shortly thereafter. Based on radio exposure and performances at dance halls, and particularly Dessau Dance Hall, he gained a regional following in Texas and was signed to Imperial Records in 1949.

In some time before his first Imperial recordings he hired fiddle player Perk Williams. Perk became the band's vocalist, even though he had no previous experience singing, but it was with Perk the band was associated during its period of greatest success. Heap and the Melody Masters were the first to record "Wild Side of Life", and when Hank Thompson took the song to #1 in March 1952 it provided Heap and his band their big break. In 1954 Jimmy Heap and the Melody Masters had a #5 hit with "Release Me". It was recorded at the Gold Star Studios in Houston. Heap and the Melody Masters served as the house band at KTAE (AM) in 1955. In 1956 he had a minor country hit (chart position #96) with a song called "Butternut". The Melody Masters released 32 sides for Capitol in all. There were no other hits for Capitol, and Heap began releasing material on his own record labels.

Trying to adapt to changing musical tastes, Heap parted ways with Perk Williams in 1957 because Perk would not change his style.

Heap signed to D Records in 1958. He abandoned the honky-tonk style and attempted to become a rock band, using new vocalists and a saxophonist. Heap released additional records on Fame after his association with D ended.

In the 1960s the group had a residence at the Golden Nugget, an act that included sexual material. A number of party records by the group were released at this time.

Heap made one last solo album for Crazy Cajun Records in 1977, after which he retired from the music business. Heap died on December 3, 1977, when he drowned while fishing.

== Style and influence ==
Jimmy Heap and the Melody Masters have been proffered as "one of the best exemplars of the post-World War II-era style of honky-tonk music."

Although primarily associated with honky-tonk country, he also performed music considered pop and rock and roll.

Heap and his band was an early influence on Sonny Rhodes.
