= Release Me (Eddie Miller song) =

1949 song

Single by Eddie Miller
- Released: 1949
- Recorded: Various
- Genre: Country Music
- Label: 4 Star Records
- Songwriters: Eddie Miller; James Pebworth; Robert Yount

"Release Me" (sometimes rendered as "Release Me (and Let Me Love Again)") is a country song written by Eddie Miller and Robert Yount in 1949. Four years later it was recorded by Jimmy Heap & the Melody Masters (in 1953), and with even better success by Ray Price (1954), Kitty Wells (1954), and Patti Page (1961). Jimmy Dean recorded a version of the song in 1959. Jivin' Gene Bourgeois & the Jokers recorded the tune in 1960, and that version served as an inspiration for Little Esther Phillips, who reached number one on the R&B chart and number eight on the pop chart with her big-selling cover. The Everly Brothers followed in 1963, along with Lucille Starr including a translation in French (1964), Jerry Wallace (1966), Dean Martin (1967), and Engelbert Humperdinck (1967), whose version reached number one on the UK Singles Chart.

Humperdinck’s version of “Release Me” has the distinction of holding the number one slot in the UK for six weeks during March and April 1967, preventing the Beatles' "Penny Lane" / "Strawberry Fields Forever" double A-sided single from reaching the top spot. Humperdinck's "Release Me" was also the highest selling single of 1967 in the UK, recording over one million in sales. Actual sales stand at 1.38 million copies.

In Czechia, the Czech parodic version "Trouba" ("Oven" or "Halfwit") is one of the most popular hits of singer Lucie Bílá and songwriter Gabriela Osvaldová.

== Writing credits ==
Although Eddie Miller later claimed to have written the song in 1946—only being able to record it himself in 1949—he actually co-wrote it with Robert Yount in 1949. As they were working at that time with Dub Williams, a pseudonym of James Pebworth, they gave him one-third of the song. The song was released with the writing credited to Miller-Williams-Gene, as Yount was using his stage name of Bobby Gene.

Although the owner of 4 Star Records, William McCall, would usually add his pseudonym "W.S. Stevenson" to the credit of songs he published, he failed to do so in 1949. However, in 1957, Miller and Yount entered into a new publishing agreement with 4 Star Records, in which "W.S. Stevenson" replaced Williams as co-writer.

Yount signed away his royalty rights to William McCall in 1958, after which the credits to the song officially became "Miller-Stevenson", although multiple variations also existed. For example, Engelbert Humperdinck's United Kingdom 45 is credited to Eddie Miller, Robert Yount, Dub Williams and Robert Harris. The Harris credit, however, turned out to be another pseudonym for James Pebworth (along with Dub Williams).

With the bankruptcy of Four Star’s successor in interest, the copyright to the song was acquired by Acuff-Rose Music. When the initial term of copyright ended in 1983, it was renewed for a second term. Between 1983 and 1985 Acuff-Rose paid royalties to Yount, until they were notified by the family of the deceased William McCall of the 1958 assignment. Acuff-Rose then suspended payments until the dispute between the claimants was resolved. On December 24, 1996 the United States Courts of Appeals, Ninth Circuit, upheld the claim of the McCalls.

== In country music ==
"Release Me"

Single by Ray Price
- A-side: "I'll Be There (If You Ever Want Me)"
- Released: January 1954
- Recorded: December 28, 1953
- Studio: Castle Studio at the Tulane Hotel (Nashville, Tennessee)
- Genre: Country
- Label: Columbia 4-21214
- Songwriters: Eddie Miller; James Pebworth; Robert Yount
- Producer: Don Law

Ray Price singles chronology
"Leave Her Alone" (1953)	"Release Me" / "I'll Be There (If You Ever Want Me)" (1954)	"I'm Much too Young to Die" (1954)

"Release Me"

Single by Esther Phillips

from the album Release Me
- B-side: "Don't Feel Rained On"
- Released: October 1962
- Recorded: 1962
- Genre: R&B
- Length: 3:18
- Label: Lenox
- Songwriters: Eddie Miller; James Pebworth; Robert Yount
- Producer: Bob Gans

Esther Phillips singles chronology
"Ring-a-Ding-Doo" (1952)	"Release Me" (1962)	"I Really Don't Want to Know" (1963)

In country music, "Release Me" became a hit for Jimmy Heap, Kitty Wells, and Ray Price, all in 1954. Even though Price had several major hits beforehand, "Release Me" is sometimes considered his breakthrough hit. The song had elements of the 4/4 shuffle, Price's signature sound that would become more evident on future successes such as "Crazy Arms."

Price's version was part of a double-A sided hit, paired with another song that introduced fans to the 4/4 shuffle: "I'll Be There (If You Ever Want Me)" Both sides went on to become major hits for Price, with "Release Me" peaking at No. 6 and "I'll Be There" stopping at No. 2.

== Engelbert Humperdinck version ==
"Release Me"

Single by Engelbert Humperdinck
- B-side: "Ten Guitars"
- Released: February 1967
- Genre: Pop; country
- Length: 3:18
- Label: Decca Records F12541
- Songwriters: Eddie Miller; James Pebworth; Robert Yount
- Producer: Charles Blackwell

Engelbert Humperdinck singles chronology
"Dommage Dommage" (1966)	"Release Me" (1967)	"There Goes My Everything" (1967)

In 1965, Engelbert Humperdinck, who at the time was performing under the name of Gerry Dorsey, met up again with an old friend of his, Gordon Mills. By that time Mills was successfully managing Tom Jones. Mills added Dorsey to his management roster and changed his name. As Humperdinck, the singer released a couple of near misses in the UK although one song, "Dommage, Dommage", was successful in Europe.

Early in 1967, Humperdinck was asked to stand in for Dickie Valentine, who was ill, on Sunday Night at the London Palladium, a TV variety show that was one of the highest-rating programs in the UK at the time. He sang "Release Me" on the show. It reached number one in the UK Singles Chart on 2 March and stayed there for six weeks, keeping "Penny Lane" / "Strawberry Fields Forever" by the Beatles off the top spot, the first time the Beatles had not reached the top since their debut single. Humperdinck's recording stayed in the charts for a record fifty-six consecutive weeks.

The B-side, "Ten Guitars", became a surprise hit in New Zealand among young Maori moving to the cities for work, and, not long after, the wider New Zealand music scene as well. Ten Guitars later served as the name for a documentary on New Zealand popular music.

British journalist and author Peter Hitchens has described Humperdinck's hugely successful version as "the real revolutionary anthem of the Sixties" and "far more influential than Bob Dylan", drawing a comparison between the song's lyrics and the desire of the public to be released from the social conservatism that had prevailed in society until the 1960s.

== Gospel version ==
In the 1950s and 1960s, composer Eddie Miller authorized alternative lyrics to adapt the melody into a Southern gospel hymn titled, "Release Me (From My Sin)" with the key lyric changed to, "Release me from sin, to sin no more". The gospel version achieved notable success within the Christian music industry, including:

- The Blackwood Brothers, who used it as the title track for their 1972 album and won the Grammy Award for Best Gospel Performance (Other Than Soul Gospel) for the track at the 16th Annual Grammy Awards in 1974.
- The Kingsmen Quartet, who featured a widely recognized version on their 1994 album, Gospel Dynamite.
- The Florida Boys, who included a traditional quartet version of the track on their 1975 album, First Class Gospel.
- The Prophets Quartet, who recorded an early version on their 1963 album, I Know out There Somewhere.
- George Jones, who recorded the track for his 1974 sacred album, In a Gospel Way.

=== Chart performance ===
Chart (1967)	Peak position
Australia (KMR)	3
Belgium (Ultratop 50 Flanders)	1
Belgium (Ultratop 50 Wallonia)	14
Canada (RPM) Top Singles	2
Germany (GfK)	20
Ireland (IRMA)	1
Netherlands (Dutch Top 40)	2
Netherlands (Single Top 100)	2
New Zealand (Listener)	2
UK Singles (Official Charts)	1
US Billboard Hot 100	4
US Adult Contemporary (Billboard)	28

Chart (1999)	Peak position
New Zealand (Recorded Music NZ)	45
