= Tommy Collins (singer) =

American singer-songwriter

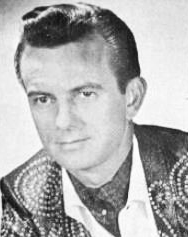
- Collins in 1966

Background information
- Also known as: Tommy Collins
- Born: Leonard Raymond Sipes; September 28, 1930; Bethany, Oklahoma, U.S.
- Died: March 14, 2000 (aged 69) Ashland City, Tennessee, U.S.
- Genres: Country, Bakersfield sound
- Occupations: Singer-songwriter, musician
- Instruments: Vocals, guitar
- Years active: 1950s – 2000
- Labels: Capitol, Columbia

Leonard Raymond Sipes (September 28, 1930 – March 14, 2000), better known as Tommy Collins, was an American country music singer and songwriter.

== Biography ==
Active primarily during the 1950s through the 1970s, Collins was instrumental in helping create the Bakersfield sound of the country music genre. He enjoyed a string of hits during the mid-1950s including "It Tickles" and "Watcha Gonna Do Now".

Many of the songs he wrote were recorded by other artists. His song "If You Ain't Lovin' (You Ain't Livin')" was a top 10 hit for Faron Young in 1954 and, decades later, hit No. 1 on the chart for George Strait in 1988. In late 1963, Buck Owens released an LP consisting entirely of songs written or co-written by Collins, Buck Owens Sings Tommy Collins, which reached No. 1 on the Billboard Top Country Albums chart in January 1964, holding the top spot for two weeks.

After several years in the ministry, Collins returned to recording. In 1965, he had a comeback hit with "If You Can't Bite, Don't Growl". In the 1970s, he wrote several hits for Merle Haggard and The Strangers, including the No. 1 hits "Carolyn" and "The Roots of My Raising". In June 1980, Haggard recorded a biographical tribute to Collins called "Leonard".

Collins was the inspiration and character talked about in Craig Morgan's song, "I Wish I Could See Bakersfield".

Collins remained active in the songwriting business. In 1999, he was inducted into the Nashville Songwriters Hall of Fame, in a class of inductees that also included Wayne Kemp, A.L. "Doodle" Owens, and Glenn Sutton. He died March 14, 2000, at his home in Ashland City, Tennessee.

== Discography ==
=== Albums ===
Year	Album	US Country	Label
1957	Words and Music Country Style	—	Capitol
1958	Light of the Lord	—	Capitol
1959	This Is Tommy Collins	—	Capitol
1960	Songs I Love to Sing	—	Capitol
1966	Let's Live a Little	—	Tower
1966	The Dynamic Tommy Collins	—	Columbia
1968	Shindig	—	Tower
1968	Tommy Collins on Tour (His Most Requested Songs)	44	Columbia
1971	Callin'	—	Starday
1980	Country Souvenir	—	Greenwood
1980	Cowboys Get Lucky Some of the Time	—	Greenwood
1986	New Patches	—	Password

=== Singles ===
Year	Single	US Country
1954	"You Better Not Do That"	2
1954	"Whatcha Gonna Do Now"	4
1955	"Untied"	10
1955	"It Tickles"	5
1955	"I Guess I'm Crazy"	13
1955	"You Oughta See Pickles Now"	15
1964	"I Can Do That" (with Wanda Collins)	47
1966	"If You Can't Bite, Don't Growl"^{A}	7
1966	"Shindig in the Barn"	47
1967	"Don't Wipe the Tears That You Cry for Him (On My Good White Shirt)"	62
1967	"Birmingham"	60
1967	"Big Dummy"	52
1968	"I Made the Prison Band"	64

- ^{A}"If You Can't Bite, Don't Growl" also peaked at number 5 on the Bubbling Under Hot 100 Singles chart.
