= Jimmy C. Newman =

American country music singer-songwriter (1927–2014)

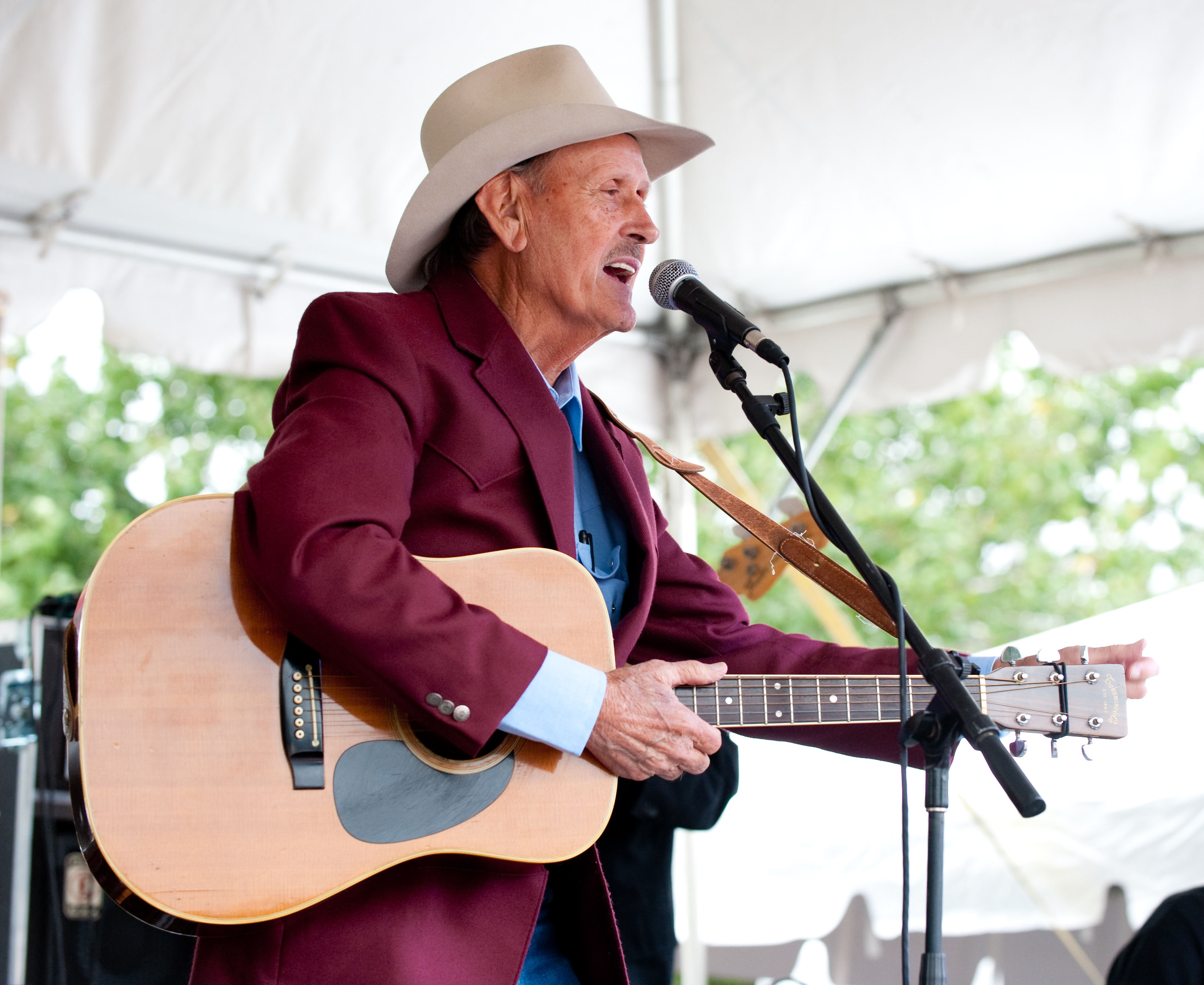
- Newman at 2009 Festivals Acadiens et Créoles

Background information
- Born: Jimmy Yves Newman; August 29, 1927; Mamou, Louisiana, U.S.
- Died: June 21, 2014 (aged 86) Nashville, Tennessee, U.S.
- Genres: Country, Cajun
- Occupation: Singer-songwriter
- Instrument: Acoustic guitar
- Years active: 1954–2014
- Label: Feature Records

Jimmy Yves Newman (August 29, 1927 – June 21, 2014), better known as Jimmy C. Newman (the C stands for Cajun), was an American country music and Cajun singer-songwriter and long-time star of the Grand Ole Opry.

== Early life ==
Newman was born near Mamou, Louisiana, United States. As a child, he listened more to Gene Autry than to the Cajun music of the area, but had a number of Cajun songs in his repertoire when, as a teenager, he joined Chuck Guillory's Rhythm Boys.

== Early career ==
He recorded a few unsuccessful sides for J. D. "Jay" Miller's Feature Records in the 1940s, but Miller persuaded Fred Rose in Nashville to give the young singer an opportunity. In 1953, he was signed to Dot Records and the following year recorded "Cry, Cry, Darling", which reached number four on the country chart.

His recording success led the Louisiana Hayride in Shreveport, Louisiana, to hire him as a regular performer. His next four records all reached top-10 status, and in 1956, he was invited to become a member of the Grand Ole Opry. That following year, he released his biggest hit, "A Fallen Star", which spent two weeks at number two and also entered the top 25 of the Billboard Hot 100 pop chart.

As an established artist, he began to integrate his Cajun influences into his music, and recorded "Alligator Man", which was a top-25 record and continued to be his theme song at the Opry. In 1963, he released another top-10 hit, "The D.J. Cried". His final hits came in 1965 and 1966 with "Artificial Rose" and "Back Pocket Money". When his commercial popularity declined, he returned to Cajun music, forming his Cajun Country band and taking the high-energy fiddle- and accordion-based music of his native Louisiana to fans around the world. In 1976, his recording of the Cajun French song, "Lâche pas la patate" ("The Potato Song") earned gold record status in Canada. In 1991, Newman and Cajun Country earned a Grammy Award nomination for their album, Alligator Man.

Entertainer Dolly Parton has long credited Newman with enabling her first appearance on the Grand Ole Opry, in 1959, describing how when she appeared at the Opry unannounced at age 13, asking to sing, Newman relinquished one of his two allotted slots to allow Parton to perform.

== Later career ==
In 2000, he was inducted into the North American Country Music Association’s International Hall of Fame, and in 2004 was inducted into the Cajun Hall of Fame. He is also honored in the Cajun Music Hall of Fame in Eunice, Louisiana, and in 2009, he was inducted into the Louisiana Music Hall of Fame. He continued to tour and appear regularly at the Grand Ole Opry, making his last appearance on the show on June 6, 2014. In 2006, he joined a select group of entertainers who have marked 50 years of Opry membership.

== Personal life ==
Newman and his wife made their home on their 670-acre (2.7 km^{2}) ranch outside of Nashville near Murfreesboro, Tennessee.

== Death ==
Newman died of cancer, in Nashville, on June 21, 2014.

== Discography ==
=== Albums ===
Year	Album title	US Country	Label
1959	This Is Jimmy Newman	—	MGM
1962	Jimmy Newman	—	Decca
1963	Folk Songs of the Bayou Country	—	Decca
1966	Artificial Rose	10	Decca
1966	Sings Country Songs	—	Decca
1967	The World of Country Music	—	Decca
1968	The Jimmy Newman Way	—	Decca
1968	Born to Love You	42	Decca
1969	The Jimmy Newman Style	—	Decca
1970	Country Time	—	Decca
1974	Sings Cajun	—	La Louisiane
1976	Progressive Country	—	Plantation
1976	Greatest Hits	—	Plantation
1978	Cajun Cowboy	—	Plantation
1979	Happy Cajun	—	Plantation
1981	Cajun Country	—	Delta

=== Singles ===
Year	Single	US Country	Album
1953	"I Made a Big Mistake"	—	The Original Cry, Cry, Darling; Jimmy Newman & Al Terry – Their Earliest Recordings 1949–1952
1953	"I Don't Know What I'm Going to Do"	—	The Original Cry, Cry, Darling; Jimmy Newman & Al Terry – Their Earliest Recordings 1949–1952
1954	"Cry, Cry, Darling"	4	singles only
1954	"Night Time Is Cry Time"	—	singles only
1954	"Your True and Faithful One"	—	singles only
1955	"Daydreamin'"	7	singles only
1955	"Blue Darlin'"	7	singles only
1956	"God Was So Good"	9	singles only
1956	"Seasons of My Heart"	9	singles only
1956	"Come Back to Me"	13	singles only
1956	"Honky Tonk Tears"	—	singles only
1957	"I've Got You on My Mind"	—	singles only
1957	"A Fallen Star"^{A}	2	singles only
1957	"Need Me"	—	singles only
1958	"Step Aside Shallow Water Let the Deep Sea Roll"	—	singles only
1958	"Bop-a-Hula"	—	singles only
1958	"You're Makin' a Fool Out of Me"	7	This Is Jimmy Newman
1959	"So Soon"	19	This Is Jimmy Newman
1959	"Lonely Girl"	30	This Is Jimmy Newman
1959	"Grin and Bear It"	9	singles only
1959	"Walkin' Down the Road"	29	singles only
1960	"I Miss You Already"	21	singles only
1960	"A Lovely Work of Art"	6	singles only
1960	"Wanting You With Me Tonight"	11	singles only
1961	"Everybody's Dying for Love"	14	Jimmy Newman
1961	"Big Mamou"	—	Jimmy Newman
1962	"Alligator Man"	22	Jimmy Newman
1962	"Of All the Things (You Left)"	—	singles only
1962	"After Dark Affair"	—	singles only
1963	"Bayou Talk"	12	singles only
1963	"Everything"	—	singles only
1964	"D.J. for a Day"	9	singles only
1964	"Angel on Leave"	34	singles only
1964	"Summer Skies and Golden Sands"	34	singles only
1964	"You're Still on My Mind"	—	singles only
1965	"City of the Angels"	37	Artificial Rose
1965	"Back in Circulation"	13	Artificial Rose
1965	"Artificial Rose"	8	Artificial Rose
1966	"Back Pocket Money"	10	Sings Country Songs
1966	"Bring Your Heart Home"	25	Sings Country Songs
1967	"Dropping Out of Sight"	32	The World of Country Music
1967	"Louisiana Saturday Night"	24	The Jimmy Newman Way
1967	"Blue Lonely Winter"	11	The Jimmy Newman Way
1968	"Sunshine and Bluebirds"	47	Born to Love You
1968	"Born to Love You"^{B}	20	Born to Love You
1969	"Future Farmers of America"	—	Single Release only, quickly withdrawn after protests from the actual F.F.A.
1969	"Boo Dan"	31	The Jimmy Newman Style
1969	"Three"	—	The Jimmy Newman Style
1970	"Foolishly"	—	Country Time
1970	"Washington, DC"	—	Country Time
1970	"I'm Holding Your Memory (But He's Holding You)"	65	singles only
1971	"Is It Really Over"	—	singles only
1972	"Secret Love"	—	singles only
1972	"Not as a Sweetheart (Just as a Friend)"	—	singles only
1972	"Wild Rose"	—	singles only
1973	"Kind of Love I Can't Forget"	—	singles only
1973	"Just Once More"	—	singles only
1974	"Potato Songs"	—	Sings Cajun
1974	"Go Go Song"	—	single only
1978	"Happy Cajun"	—	Happy Cajun
1979	"Sugar Bee"	—	Happy Cajun
1979	"Sweet Suzannah"	—	Happy Cajun
1980	"Cotton Eyed Joe"	—	single only
1981	"Louisiana"	—	Cajun Country
1982	"All My Cloudy Days Are Gone"	—	singles only
1983	"Wondering"	—	singles only
1984	"Passe par tout"	—	singles only
1987	"Laissez les bons temps rouler"	—	singles only

- ^{A}"A Fallen Star" peaked at No. 23 on the Billboard Hot 100 and No.7 on the R&B chart.
- ^{B}"Born to Love You" peaked at No. 35 on the RPM Country Tracks chart in Canada.

== Bibliography ==
- Seemann, Charlie (1998). "Jimmy C. Newman". In The Encyclopedia of Country Music. Paul Kingsbury, Editor. New York: Oxford University Press. p. 379.
