= Loose Talk (song) =

1954 song by Hardy Turner and Freddie Hart

"Loose Talk" is a 1954 song written by Hardy Turner and Freddie Hart (who also recorded it on Capitol, but it did not chart) and recorded by Carl Smith. It was Smith's final number one, staying at the top spot of the Billboard country and western chart for seven weeks and spending a total of 32 weeks on the chart. The B-side was "More Than Anything Else in the World," which peaked at number five on the same chart.

== Cover versions ==
- The song was covered in 1960 by Buck Owens and Rose Maddox and reached No. 4 On the country charts as a B-side to song "Mental Cruelty".
- The song was sung live in 1960 by Patsy Cline on a radio broadcast of the Grand Ole Opry and released in 1988 on the album Live At The Opry.
- The song was covered by John Prine and Connie Smith on their 1999 duet record In Spite of Ourselves.
