= Ginny Wright =

American country music singer (1932–2021)

Ginny Wright (full name Ethel Virginia Henderson) was an American country music singer who was born in Twin City, Georgia, August 1, 1932.

Ginny Wright first experience in live performance was singing in glee clubs, she then moved on and studied opera. She began performing country music in the early 1950s. Her first single was on the Triple A label, following her discovery by deejay Jack Gale.

Wright next signed with the new Fabor label on the West Coast, recording a duet with Jim Reeves, "I Love You" (Fabor 101), which spent 22 weeks on Billboard's country charts in early 1954, peaking at No. 3. One year later she returned to the hit parade with another duet, "Are You Mine?" (Fabor 117), this time with Tom Tall, which did even better. Over a 26-week run on Billboard's country charts, it peaked at No. 2. It was her second top 10 duet and her final chart appearance.

After taking a break from her career in the mid-1950s to raise a family, Wright entered country music in the 1960s, cutting a few singles for the Chart label. Wright recorded more duets, including additional ones with Tom Tall, who followed her to the Chart label.

Her sound began to change in the 1960s, acquiring more of a Nashville flavor. A series of one-off label recordings followed, including a couple for Jack Gale's Gallery 11 label, one for Travel and a couple for Cayce. Wright also cut an album for Playback Records featuring gospel standards with organ accompaniment.

At this time Wright's popularity began to rise in the German market. Her first German success was the album Ginny Wright's Songs & Duets. This was followed by another album on the Bear Family label titled Whirlwind; her duets with Tom Tall were issued on a separate LP under his name. These albums are out of print and the original singles are very rare.

Wright was inducted into the Louisiana Hayride Hall Of Fame in 2003; and a year later, Bear Family released a CD containing most of Wright and Tom Tall's Fabor recordings.

Ginny died on September 5, 2021. Her funeral was held on September 9 in Augusta, Ga, aged 89. She was laid to rest in Antioch Primitive Baptist Church Cemetery.
