= Oh Baby Mine (I Get So Lonely) =

Single by The Four Knights
- Released: 1953
- Recorded: 1953
- Length: 2:02
- Label: Capitol
- Songwriter(s): Pat Ballard

"Oh Baby Mine (I Get So Lonely)" is a popular song written and published by Pat Ballard in 1953.

== Original recording ==
The biggest hit version was done by The Four Knights on Capitol Records in 1953. The song reached No. 3 on Billboard's Best Sellers chart, and No. 2 on Cash Box in 1954.

== Cover versions ==
- Bing Crosby recorded the song on January 29, 1954, accompanied by Guy Lombardo and his Royal Canadians in Los Angeles.
- Anne Shelton with Ken Mackintosh and his orchestra recorded it in London on March 3, 1954. The song was released by EMI on the His Master's Voice label as catalog number B 10680.
- In 1954, Johnnie & Jack had a number 1 country hit with their recording. In April 1954, it peaked at No. 1 on the Billboard country and western chart. It was also ranked No. 25 on Billboard's 1954 year-end country and western retail sales chart.
- The Statler Brothers, whose version was a number 2 country hit in 1983. The Statlers' version was their first song to feature vocals by Jimmy Fortune, who had replaced Lew DeWitt, who had retired due to health problems.
- Also in 1983, Dutch singer/comedian Andre van Duin released it (with new lyrics) as "De Heidezangers"; in the accompanying video he portrayed a three-piece amateur-band of piano, guitar and bass. He famously turned "Oh Baby Mine" into the speech-impedimental "Ik ssspeel de basss" ("I play the bass").

== Media culture ==
- The song was sung by The Sportsmen Quartet and Eddie "Rochester" Anderson in the season 5 episode of The Jack Benny Program, "How Jack Found Mary".
- The song was also sung in the season 2 episode of The Bob Newhart Show, "My Wife Belongs to Daddy".
