= Carl Smith (musician) =

American country singer (1927–2010)

- Smith pictured around 1960

Background information
- Also known as: Mister Country
- Born: Carl Milton Smith; March 15, 1927; Maynardville, Tennessee, U.S.
- Died: January 16, 2010 (aged 82) Franklin, Tennessee, U.S.
- Genres: Country, rockabilly
- Occupation: Singer
- Years active: 1942–1983
- Labels: Columbia Records; Hickory Records
- Spouses: June Carter (m. 1952; div. 1956) Goldie Hill (m. 1957; died 2005)

Carl Milton Smith (March 15, 1927 – January 16, 2010) was an American country singer. Known as "Mister Country", he was one of the genre's most successful male artists during the 1950s, scoring 30 top-10 Billboard hits (21 of which were consecutive). Smith's success continued well into the 1970s, when he had a charting single every year but one. In 1952, Smith married June Carter, with whom he had daughter Carlene; the couple divorced in 1956. He later married Goldie Hill, and they had three children together. In 2003, he was inducted into the Country Music Hall of Fame. According to the Hollywood Walk of Fame website, he was a "drinking companion" to Johnny Cash, his daughter's stepfather.

== Biography ==
=== Early career ===
Smith was born in Maynardville, Tennessee, in 1927 (the same town in which fellow country icon Roy Acuff had been born), and started to aspire to a musical career after hearing the Grand Ole Opry on the radio. He sold seed to pay for guitar lessons as a teenager. At age 15, he started performing in a band called Kitty Dibble and her Dude Ranch Ranglers. By age 17, he had learned to play the string bass and spent his summer vacation working at WROL-AM in Knoxville, Tennessee, where he performed on Cas Walker's radio show.

After graduating from high school, he served in the U.S. Navy from 1944–47. He returned to WROL and played string bass for country singers Molly O'Day and Skeets Williamson, and began his singing career. A colleague at the station sent an acetate disc recording of Smith's to WSM-AM and the Grand Ole Opry in Nashville, Tennessee, and WSM soon signed him. In 1950, Smith was signed to a recording contract with Columbia Records by producer Don Law.

=== Success in the 1950s ===
In 1951, his song "Let's Live a Little" was a big hit, reaching number two on the Billboard country chart. During 1951, he had three other hits, including "If the Teardrops Were Pennies" and his first number-one hit, "Let Old Mother Nature Have Her Way". The songs made Smith a well-known name in country music. His band, the Tunesmiths, featured steel guitarist Johnny Silbert, who added an element of Western swing.

In 1952, Smith married June Carter, daughter of Maybelle Carter of the Carter family. It was the first marriage for both. In 1955, the couple had a daughter, Rebecca Carlene Smith, who later became known as Carlene Carter, a country singer in her own right. The couple recorded the duets, "Time's a Wastin'" and "Love Oh Crazy Love". During the rest of the 1950s, Smith made regular appearances on Billboard's country chart, racking up many hits, including 30 in the top 10. His biggest hits include "Loose Talk", "Hey Joe!", (When You Feel Like You're in Love) Don't Just Stand There, and "You Are the One". He had five number-one hits in his career; "Loose Talk" was his last, in 1955. In 1956, Smith quit the Grand Ole Opry. Soon after, he joined The Phillip Morris Country Music Show and spent more than a year touring the United States, often in direct competition with touring Opry shows. He also made regular appearances on ABC-TV's Jubilee USA and was a fill-in host for Red Foley.

In 1956, Smith and June Carter divorced. In 1957, he appeared in the movies The Badge of Marshal Brennan and Buffalo Gun, and married country music singer Goldie Hill, best known for the number-one hit "I Let the Stars Get in My Eyes". Goldie retired from the music business. By the late 1950s, Smith's success began to dwindle on the country chart, and soon his string of top-10 hits began to dwindle.

=== Later years ===
By the 1960s, Smith's success as a country singer began to slow. His top-20 hits included "Air Mail to Heaven" in 1962 and "Take My Ring Off Your Finger" in 1964. His biggest hit of the decade was "Deep Water" in 1967, which peaked at number 10 and became his first top 10 in eight years (and his final top-10 appearance). In 1961, he was one of five rotating hosts on the NBC television series Five Star Jubilee. He also hosted Carl Smith's Country Music Hall in Canada, a series syndicated in the United States. Smith appeared on The Jimmy Dean Show on April 9, 1964.

In the 1960s and 1970s, Smith incorporated more Western swing into much of his recorded material. He remained with Columbia Records for almost 25 years, leaving in 1975 to sign with Hickory Records. By this time, his singles were barely making the charts. He appeared in the Hawaii Five-O episode, "Man on Fire", first aired on October 21, 1976.

Due to his real-estate and song-publishing investments, he decided to retire from the music business in the late 1970s to concentrate on his second passion, raising cutting horses, but in 1983, he recorded an album for the Gusto label. In 2003, he was inducted into the Country Music Hall of Fame.

=== Death ===
In his later years, Smith lived on a 500-acre (2.0 km^{2}) horse farm in Franklin, Tennessee, (south of Nashville), where he died on January 16, 2010, at the age of 82. His wife Goldie had died five years prior. He was survived by two sons, Carl Jr. and Larry Dean, and two daughters, Carlene and Lori Lynn.

== Discography ==
=== Albums ===
Year	Album	US Country	Label
1955	Carl, Lefty and Marty (w/ Lefty Frizzell & Marty Robbins)	—	Columbia
1955	Carl Smith	—	Columbia
1956	Sentimental Songs by Carl Smith	—	Columbia
1956	Softly and Tenderly	—	Columbia
1957	Sunday Down South	—	Columbia
1957	Smith's the Name	—	Columbia
1958	Let's Live a Little	—	Columbia
1960	The Carl Smith Touch	—	Columbia
1961	Easy to Please	—	Columbia
1962	Carl Smith's Greatest Hits	—	Columbia
1963	The Tall, Tall Gentleman	12	Columbia
1964	Carl Smith's Best	—	Columbia
1964	There Stands the Glass	9	Columbia
1965	Walkin' Tall	—	Columbia
1965	I Want to Live and Love	—	Columbia
1965	Kisses Don't Lie	—	Columbia
1966	Man with a Plan	18	Columbia
1967	Satisfaction Guaranteed	—	Columbia
1967	A Gentleman in Love	—	Columbia
1967	The Country Gentleman	22	Columbia
1967	The Carl Smith Special: The Country Gentleman Sings His Favorites	34	Columbia
1968	Deep Water	28	Columbia
1968	Country On My Mind	42	Columbia
1969	Take It Like a Man	—	Columbia
1969	Faded Love and Winter Roses	23	Columbia
1969	Carl Smith's Greatest Hits, Vol. 2	40	Columbia
1969	Carl Smith Sings a Tribute to Roy Acuff	48	Columbia
1970	Carl and the Tunesmiths	—	Columbia
1970	I Love You Because	44	Columbia
1970	The Carl Smith Anniversary Album: 20 Years of Hits	34	Columbia
1971	Sings Bluegrass	—	Columbia
1972	Don't Say You're Mine	34	Columbia
1972	If This Is Goodbye	28	Columbia
1975	The Way I Lose My Mind	47	Hickory/MGM
1975	The Girl That I Love	—	Hickory/MGM
1977	This Lady Loving Me	—	Hickory/MGM
1978	Silver Tongued Cowboy	—	Hickory/MGM
1980	Greatest Hits	—	Gusto
1982	The Legendary	—	Gusto

=== Singles ===
Year	Single	Chart Positions			Album
Year	Single	US Country	US	CAN Country	Album
1950	"Guilty Conscience"	—	—	—	Single only
1950	"I Overlooked an Orchid (While Searching For a Rose)"	—	—	—	Single only
1951	"Let's Live a Little"	2	—	—	Let's Live a Little
1951	"There's Nothing As Sweet As My Baby"	flip	—	—	Let's Live a Little
1951	"Mr. Moon"	4	—	—	Let's Live a Little
1951	"If Teardrops Were Pennies"	8	—	—	Let's Live a Little
1951	"Let Old Mother Nature Have Her Way"	1	—	—	Sentimental Songs
1952	"(When You Feel Like You're in Love) Don't Just Stand There"	1	—	—	Sentimental Songs
1952	"Me and My Broken Heart" (cover of Hank Williams song)	-	—	—	Sentimental Songs
1952	"Are You Teasing Me"	1	—	—	Sentimental Songs
1952	"It's a Lovely, Lovely World"	5	—	—	Sentimental Songs
1952	"Our Honeymoon"	6	—	—	
1953	"That's the Kind of Love I'm Looking For"	9	—	—	Carl Smith's Best
1953	"Just Wait 'Til I Get You Alone"	7	—	—	Carl Smith's Best
1953	"This Orchid Means Goodbye"	4	—	—	Single only
1953	"Trademark"	2	—	—	Satisfaction Guaranteed
1953	"Do I Like It?"	6	—	—	Single only
1953	"Hey Joe"	1	—	—	Greatest Hits
1953	"Satisfaction Guaranteed"	7	—	—	Satisfaction Guaranteed
1954	"Dog-Gone It, Baby, I'm in Love"	7	—	—	Satisfaction Guaranteed
1954	"Back Up Buddy"	2	—	—	The Tall, Tall Gentleman
1954	"Go, Boy Go"	4	—	—	Carl Smith's Best
1954	"Loose Talk"	1	—	—	Carl Smith
1954	"More Than Anything Else in the World"	5	—	—	Single only
1955	"Kisses Don't Lie"	5	—	—	Walkin' Tall
1955	"No, I Don't Believe I Will"	13	—	—	Carl Smith's Best
1955	"Wait a Little Longer Please, Jesus"	12	—	—	Sunday Down South
1955	"There She Goes"	3	—	—	Carl Smith
1955	"Old Lonesome Times"	11	—	—	Greatest Hits
1955	"Don't Tease Me"	11	—	—	Single only
1955	"You're Free to Go"	6	—	—	Greatest Hits
1955	"I Feel Like Cryin'"	7	—	—	Carl Smith
1956	"I've Changed"	11	—	—	Single only
1956	"You Are the One"	4	—	—	Greatest Hits
1956	"Doorstep to Heaven"	6	—	—	Greatest Hits
1956	"Before I Met You"	6	—	—	The Tall, Tall Gentleman
1956	"Wicked Lies"	9	—	—	Singles only
1957	"You Can't Hurt Me Anymore"	15	—	—	Singles only
1957	"Try to Take It Like a Man"	—	—	—	Singles only
1957	"Why, Why"	2	—	—	Singles only
1958	"Your Name Is Beautiful"	6	80	—	Singles only
1958	"Guess I've Been Around Too Long"	—	93	—	Singles only
1958	"Walking the Slow Walk"	28	—	—	Singles only
1959	"The Best Years of My Life"	15	—	—	Let's Live a Little
1959	"It's All My Heartache"	19	—	—	Single only
1959	"Ten Thousand Drums"	5	43	—	Walkin' Tall
1959	"Tomorrow Night"	24	—	—	Singles only
1960	"Make the Waterwheel Roll"	30	—	—	Singles only
1960	"Cut Across Shorty"	28	—	—	The Carl Smith Touch
1960	"If the World Don't End Tomorrow (I'm Comin' After You)"	—	107	—	Singles only
1961	"You Make Me Live Again"	29	—	—	Singles only
1961	"Kisses Never Lie"	11	—	—	Singles only
1962	"Air Mail to Heaven"	11	—	—	The Tall, Tall Gentleman
1962	"Things That Mean the Most"	24	—	—	Single only
1962	"The Best Dressed Beggar (In Town)"	16	—	—	The Country Gentleman
1963	"Live for Tomorrow"	28	—	—	The Tall, Tall Gentleman
1963	"In the Back Room Tonight"	17	—	—	Single only
1963	"I Almost Forgot Her Today"	23	—	—	The Country Gentleman
1963	"Triangle"	16	—	—	The Country Gentleman
1964	"The Pillow That Whispers"	17	—	—	The Country Gentleman
1964	"Take My Ring Off Your Finger"	15	—	—	The Country Gentleman
1964	"Lonely Girl"	14	—	—	The Country Gentleman
1964	"When It's Over"	26	—	—	The Country Gentleman
1965	"She Called Me Baby"	32	—	—	Kisses Don't Lie
1965	"Keep Me Fooled"	42	—	—	Singles only
1965	"Be Good to Her"	33	—	—	Singles only
1965	"Let's Walk Away Strangers"	36	—	—	The Country Gentleman
1966	"Why Do I Keep Doing This to Us"	45	—	—	Singles only
1966	"Why Can't You Feel Sorry for Me"	49	—	—	Singles only
1966	"Man with a Plan"	42	—	—	Man with a Plan
1966	"You Better Be Better to Me"	52	—	—	Singles only
1967	"It's Only a Matter of Time"	65	—	—	Singles only
1967	"Mighty Day"	68	—	—	The Carl Smith Special
1967	"I Should Get Away Awhile (From You)"	54	—	—	The Carl Smith Special
1967	"Deep Water"	10	—	1	Deep Water
1968	"Foggy River"	18	—	15	Deep Water
1968	"You Ought to Hear Me Cry"	43	—	—	Carl Smith's Greatest Hits, Vol. 2
1968	"There's No More Love"	48	—	—	Single only
1969	"Faded Love and Winter Roses"	25	—	37	Faded Love And Winter Roses
1969	"Good Deal Lucille"	18	—	—	I Love You Because
1969	"I Love You Because"	14	—	—	I Love You Because
1969	"Heartbreak Avenue"	35	—	—	The Carl Smith Anniversary Album
1970	"Pull My String and Wind Me Up"	18	—	—	The Carl Smith Anniversary Album
1970	"Pick Me Up on Your Way Down"	46	—	—	Carl Smith and the Tunesmiths
1970	"Bonaparte's Retreat"	flip	—	—	Carl Smith and the Tunesmiths
1970	"How I Love Them Old Songs"	20	—	46	Singles only
1971	"Don't Worry 'bout the Mule (Just Load the Wagon)"	44	—	—	Singles only
1971	"Lost It on the Road"	43	—	—	Singles only
1971	"Red Door"	21	—	—	Don't Say You're Mine
1971	"Don't Say You're Mine"	34	—	—	Don't Say You're Mine
1972	"Mama Bear"	46	—	—	If This Is Goodbye
1972	"If This Is Goodbye"	54	—	—	If This Is Goodbye
1973	"I Need Help"	76	—	—	Single only
1975	"The Way I Lose My Mind"	67	—	—	The Way I Lose My Mind
1975	"Roly Poly"	97	—	—	The Girl That I Love
1976	"If You Don't, Somebody Else Will"	97	—	—	Single only
1976	"A Way with Words"	98	—	—	This Lady Loving Me
1977	"Show Me a Brick Wall"	96	—	50	This Lady Loving Me
1977	"This Kinda Love Ain't Meant for Sunday School"	84	—	—	This Lady Loving Me
1978	"This Lady Loving Me"	81	—	—	This Lady Loving Me
