= More and More (Webb Pierce song) =

"More and More" is a song written by country singer/songwriter Merle Kilgore. Webb Pierce's 1954 recording of "More and More" spent ten weeks at number one on the country charts and twenty-nine weeks on the chart overall. The song also crossed over and peaked at number 22 on the pop charts, making it the most successful pop single of Pierce's career. The B-side of "More and More", "You're Not Mine Anymore," peaked at number eight on the C&W Best Seller charts. The song was featured in the horror movie The Hills Have Eyes during the opening credits.

== Cover versions ==
- Charley Pride covered the song in 1983, and reached #7 on US Country and #3 on Canada Country.
