= Slowly (song) =

Song performed by Webb Pierce

"Slowly" is a 1954 song by Webb Pierce, written by Pierce and Nashville songwriter Tommy Hill (brother of singer Goldie Hill).

== Background ==
Beyond its success as a song, "Slowly" was hugely influential in the history of country music, in that it was among the first (and certainly the most successful to date) songs to feature a pedal steel guitar. The song's iconic intro, played by Bud Isaacs, was said to have sent legions of lap steel guitar players scurrying to their closets for wire coat hangers, with which they attempted to modify their existing instruments to get the pitch shifting effect achieved by Isaacs.

== Chart performance ==
The song was one of Pierce's more successful singles, spending seventeen weeks at the top of the Country and Western Best Sellers lists and a total of thirty-six weeks in the Billboard chart.

== Personnel ==
(29 November 1953, Castle Studio, The Tulane Hotel, 206 8th Ave. North, Nashville, Tennessee)

- Webb Pierce - vocals
- Hank Garland, Chet Atkins, Doyle Wilburn - guitars
- Bud Isaacs - pedal steel guitar
- Ernie Newton - bass
- Tommy Jackson, Jack Kay - fiddles
- Farris Coursey - drums

== Cover versions ==
- On August 23, 1966, Connie Smith recorded the song which appeared on her album Connie in the Country (1967)
- In 1968, Jimmy Martin recorded the song which appeared in the album Free-born Man (1969)
- In the 1960s, Jimmy Dean recorded a version for his album Jimmy Dean and The Town & Countrymen. In 1971, Jimmy Dean and Dottie West recorded a duet of the song, which hit the Top 40 on the country charts
- In 1981, Kippi Brannon had her sole hit on the country charts with her version of the song
- In 2014, The Haden Triplets (Petra, Tanya and Rachel), daughters of jazz double-bassist Charlie Haden, recorded the song for their debut album on Jack White's Third Man Records.
