= Jim Reeves discography =

- Studio albums: 44
- Live albums: 1
- Compilation albums: 14
- Singles: 71
- No. 1 singles: 13

This is a detailed discography for American country pop artist Jim Reeves.

== Albums ==
Album	Year	Chart peaks					Certifications
Album	Year	US Country	US	AUS	NOR	UK	Certifications
Jim Reeves Sings	1955	—	—	—	—	—	
Singing Down the Lane	1956	—	—	—	—	—	
Bimbo	1956	—	—	—	—	—	
Jim Reeves	1957	—	—	—	—	—	
Girls I Have Known	1958	—	—	—	20	35	
God Be with You	1958	—	—	—	4	10	
Songs to Warm the Heart	1959	—	—	—	18	—	
According to My Heart	1960	—	—	—	16	1	
The Intimate Jim Reeves	1960	—	—	—	10	8	
He'll Have to Go	1960	—	18	—	15	16	
Tall Tales and Short Tempers	1961	—	—	—	—	—	
Talkin' to Your Heart	1961	—	—	—	—	—	
The Country Side of Jim Reeves	1962	—	—	—	8	12	
A Touch of Velvet	1962	—	97	—	8	8	
We Thank Thee	1962	—	—	—	12	17	BPI: Silver
Gentleman Jim	1963	—	—	—	2	3	
The International Jim Reeves	1963	18	—	—	5	11	
Good 'n' Country	1963	13	—	—	7	10	
Twelve Songs of Christmas	1963	—	15	—	3	3	BPI: Silver
Kimberley Jim	1964	—	—	—	11	—	
Moonlight and Roses	1964	1	30	—	2	2	
The Best of Jim Reeves	1964	1	9	—	1	3	
Have I Told You Lately That I Love You?	1964	5	—	—	8	12	
Jim Reeves' Golden Records	1964	—	—	—	—	9	BPI: Gold
The Jim Reeves Way	1965	2	45	—	5	16	
Up Through the Years	1965	1	—	—	10	—	
The Best of Jim Reeves Vol. II	1965	4	100	—	7	—	
Distant Drums	1966	1	21	—	2	2	
Yours Sincerely, Jim Reeves	1966	3	—	—	15	—	
Blue Side of Lonesome	1967	3	185	—	15	—	
My Cathedral	1967	39	—	—	—	48	
A Touch of Sadness	1968	3	—	—	—	15	
Jim Reeves on Stage	1968	5	—	—	—	13	
Jim Reeves—and Some Friends	1969	18	—	—	—	24	
The Best of Jim Reeves Volume III	1969	12	—	—	—	—	
Jim Reeves Writes You a Record	1971	34	—	—	—	47	
Something Special	1971	13	—	—	—	—	
Young & Country	1971	—	—	—	—	—	
My Friend	1972	18	—	—	—	32	
Jim Reeves' Greatest	1972	—	—	34	—	—	
Missing You	1972	9	—	—	—	—	
The Best Of Jim Reeves Vol. 1	1972	—	—	—	—	—	BPI: Silver
Am I That Easy to Forget?	1973	11	—	—	—	—	
Great Moments with Jim Reeves	1973	32	—	—	—	—	
I'd Fight the World	1974	13	—	—	—	—	
Welcome to My World	1974	—	—	—	—	—	BPI: Silver
The Jim Reeves Collection	1974	—	—	—	—	—	BPI: Gold
The Best of Jim Reeves Sacred Songs	1975	37	—	—	—	—	
Songs of Love	1975	34	—	—	—	—	
40 Golden Greats	1975	—	—	—	—	1	BPI: Platinum
I Love You Because	1976	24	—	—	—	—	
A Legendary Performer	1976	25	—	—	—	—	
It's Nothin' to Me	1977	32	—	—	—	—	
Jim Reeves	1978	50	—	—	—	—	
Nashville	1978	—	—	—	—	—	
The Best 4	1979	—	—	—	—	—	
Don't Let Me Cross Over	1979	23	—	—	—	—	
There's Always Me	1980	56	—	—	—	—	
The Country Gentleman	1980	—	—	—	—	53	
Greatest Hits (with Patsy Cline)	1981	8	—	79	—	—	
Remembering Patsy Cline & Jim Reeves	1982	—	—	38	—	—	
The Jim Reeves Medley	1983	65	—	—	—	—	
The Definitive Jim Reeves 1923–1964	1992	—	—	—	—	9	
Country Classics	1994	—	—	—	—	—	BPI: Gold
The Essential Jim Reeves	1995	—	—	—	—	—	
The Ultimate Collection	1997	—	—	12	—	17	BPI: Gold
All Time Gospel Favorites	1998	—	—	—	—	—	
Super Hits	1999	—	—	—	—	—	
Radio Days	1999	—	—	—	—	—	
Greatest Hits	2000	—	—	—	—	—	BPI: Gold
Gentleman Jim – The Definitive Jim Reeves Collection	2003	—	—	—	—	21	BPI: Gold
Gentleman Jim – Memories Are Made of This	2004	—	—	—	—	35	
The Only Jim Reeves Album You Will Ever Need	2004	—	—	—	—	96	
The Collection	2007	—	—	—	—	—	BPI: Silver
Welcome to My World – The Best of Jim Reeves	2009	—	—	—	—	—	BPI: Gold
The Very Best of Jim Reeves	2009	—	—	—	—	7	BPI: Platinum
The Real... The Ultimate Jim Reeves Collection	2013	—	—	—	—	–	BPI: Silver
"—" denotes the album failed to chart or not released

== Singles ==
=== 1950s ===
Year	Single (A-side, B-side) Both tracks from the same album except where indicated	Peak positions			Album
Year	Single (A-side, B-side) Both tracks from the same album except where indicated	US Country	US Cash Box Country	US	Album
1953	"What Were You Doing (Last Night)" b/w "Wagon Load of Love" (Non-album track)	—	—	—	Bimbo
1953	"Mexican Joe" b/w "I Could Cry" (Non-album track)	1	1	23	Jim Reeves Sings
1953	"Butterfly Love" b/w "Let Me Love You Just a Little" (from Bimbo)	—	—	—	Non-album track
1954	"Bimbo" b/w "Gypsy Heart"	1	2	26	Bimbo
1954	"I Love You" (with Ginny Wright) B-side by Ginny Wright: I Want You Yes (You Want Me No) (Non-album track)	3	8	—	Jim Reeves and Some Friends
1954	"Then I'll Stop Loving You" b/w "Echo Bonita"	15	—	—	Bimbo
1954	"Beatin' on the Ding Dong" b/w "My Rambling Heart"	—	—	—	Jim Reeves Sings
1954	"Padre of Old San Antone" b/w "Mother Went A-Walking" (from Jim Reeves Sings)	—	—	—	Non-album track
1955	"Penny Candy" b/w "I'll Follow You"	5	—	—	Jim Reeves Sings
1955	"Where Does a Broken Heart Go?" b/w "The Wilder Your Heart Beats the Sweeter You Love"	—	—	—	Jim Reeves Sings
1955	"Tahiti" b/w "Give Me One More Kiss" (from Jim Reeves Sings)	—	—	—	The International Jim Reeves
1955	"Drinking Tequila" b/w "Red Eyed and Rowdy"	9	—	—	Jim Reeves Sings
1955	"Yonder Comes a Sucker" /	4	9	—	The Country Side of Jim Reeves
1955	"I'm Hurtin' Inside"	flip	—	—	Up Through the Years
1955	"Are You the One" (with Alvadean Coker) b/w "How Many?" (from Bimbo)	—	—	—	Jim Reeves Sings
1955	"Hillbilly Waltz" b/w "Let Me Remember (The Things I Can't Forget)" (Non-album track)	—	—	—	Young and Country
1956	"If You Were Mine" b/w "That's a Sad Affair" (from Up Through the Years)	—	—	—	According To My Heart
1956	"My Lips are Sealed" b/w "Pickin' a Chicken" (from Just for You)	8	10	—	The Country Side of Jim Reeves
1956	"According to My Heart" /	4	8	—	According to My Heart
1956	"The Mother of a Honky Tonk Girl" (with Carol Johnson)	flip	15	—	Jim Reeves and Some Friends
1957	"Am I Losing You" /	3	5	—	Songs to Warm the Heart
1957	"Waitin' for a Train"	flip	—	—	The Country Side of Jim Reeves
1957	"Four Walls" b/w "I Know and You Know" (Non-album track)	1	2	12	The Best of Jim Reeves
1957	"Two Shadows on Your Window" /	9	12	—	Up Through the Years
1957	"Young Hearts"	12	15	—	Up Through the Years
1958	"Anna Marie" b/w "Everywhere You Go" (from Jim Reeves)	3	7	93	Girls I Have Known
1958	"Overnight" /	10	26	—	Distant Drums
1958	"I Love You More"	8	7	—	He'll Have to Go
1958	"Blue Boy" /	2	1	45	The Best of Jim Reeves
1958	"Theme of Love (I Love to Say "I Love You")"	—	35	—	He'll Have to Go
1958	"Billy Bayou" /	1	1	95	He'll Have to Go
1958	"I'd Like to Be"	18	13	—	He'll Have to Go
1959	"Home" /	2	1	—	He'll Have to Go
1959	"If Heartache is the Fashion"	—	31	—	He'll Have to Go
1959	"Partners" /	5	3	—	He'll Have to Go
1959	"I'm Beginning to Forget You"	17	18	—	He'll Have to Go
"—" denotes releases that did not chart

=== 1960s ===
Year	Single (A-side, B-side) Both sides from same album except where indicated	Peak positions									Album
Year	Single (A-side, B-side) Both sides from same album except where indicated	US Country	US Cash Box Country	US	US AC	CAN Country	CAN	UK	NOR	IRL	Album
1960	"He'll Have to Go"^{[C]} /	1	1	2	—	—	1 (CHUM)	12	1	—	He'll Have to Go
1960	"In a Mansion Stands My Love"	—	28	—	—	—	—	—	—	—	A Touch of Sadness
1960	"I'm Gettin' Better" /	3	2	37	—	—	6	—	—	—	The Intimate Jim Reeves
1960	"I Know One"	6	7	82	—	—	6	—	—	—	Blue Side of Lonesome
1960	"I Missed Me" /	3	2	44	—	—	7	—	—	—	Distant Drums
1960	"Am I Losing You" (re-recording)	8	7	31	—	—	7	—	—	—	The Best of Jim Reeves
1961	"Whispering Hope" b/w "I'd Like To Be" (from He'll Have To Go)	—	—	—	—	—	—	50	—	—	God Be with You
1961	"The Blizzard" /	4	2	62	—	—	—	—	—	—	Tall Tales and Short Tempers
1961	"Danny Boy"	—	38	—	—	—	—	—	—	—	Tall Tales and Short Tempers
1961	"What Would You Do?" /	15	10	73	—	—	—	—	—	—	According to My Heart
1961	"Stand at Your Window"	16	9	—	—	—	—	—	—	—	According to My Heart
1961	"Losing Your Love" /	2	2	89	20	—	—	—	—	—	Distant Drums
1961	"(How Can I Write on Paper) What I Feel in My Heart"	7	13	92	—	—	—	—	—	—	Something Special
1962	"A Letter to My Heart" /	20	41	—	—	—	—	—	—	—	Distant Drums
1962	"Adios Amigo"	2	2	90	—	—	15	23	2	8	The Best of Jim Reeves
1962	"I'm Gonna Change Everything" /	2	1	95	—	—	—	42	—	—	Have I Told You Lately; That I Love You?
1962	"Pride Goes Before a Fall"	18	31	—	—	—	—	—	—	—	Up Through the Years
1962	"You're the Only Good Thing (That's Happened to Me)" b/w "Oh, How I Miss You Tonight"	—	—	—	—	—	—	17	2	—	The Intimate Jim Reeves
1963	"Is This Me?" /	3	2	103	—	—	—	—	—	—	The Best of Jim Reeves Vol. II
1963	"Missing Angel"	—	10	—	—	—	—	—	—	—	The Best of Jim Reeves Volume III
1963	"Guilty" /	3	4	91	—	—	—	29	—	6	The International Jim Reeves
1963	"Little Ole You"	11	11	—	—	—	—	—	—	—	Up Through the Years
1963	"An Old Christmas Card" b/w "Senor Santa Claus"	—	—	—	—	—	—	—	—	—	Twelve Songs of Christmas
1964	"Welcome to My World" /	2	2	102	—	—	—	6	3	1	A Touch of Velvet
1964	"Good Morning Self"	43	13	—	—	—	—	—	—	—	Distant Drums
1964	"Love Is No Excuse" (with Dottie West) /	7	3	115	—	—	—	—	—	—	Jim Reeves and Some Friends
1964	"Look Who's Talking" (with Dottie West)	—	—	121	—	—	—	—	—	—	Jim Reeves and Some Friends
1964	"I Guess I'm Crazy" /	1	1	82	17	1	—	—	2	—	The Best of Jim Reeves Vol. II
1964	"Not Until the Next Time"	—	—	—	—	—	—	13	6	6	Distant Drums
1964	"I Love You Because" b/w "Anna Marie" (from Girls I Have Known)	—	—	—	—	—	—	5	1	1	Gentleman Jim
1964	"There's a Heartache Following Me" b/w "Diamonds in the Sand" (from Kimberley Jim)	—	—	—	—	—	—	6	3	3	Good 'N' Country
1965	"I Won't Forget You" b/w "Highway to Nowhere" (from Singing Down the Lane)	3	6	93	15	—	—	3	1	1	The Country Side of Jim Reeves
1965	"How Long Has it Been" b/w "Suppertime"	—	—	—	—	—	—	45	9	—	God Be With You
1965	"This World is Not My Home" b/w "Take My Hand Precious Lord"	—	—	—	—	—	—	22	—	10	We Thank Thee
1965	"This Is It" b/w "There's That Smile Again" (from The Jim Reeves Way)	1	1	88	18	—	—	—	9	—	Distant Drums
1965	"Is It Really Over?" /	1	1	79	10	—	—	17	—	—	Distant Drums
1965	"Rosa Rio"	—	—	—	—	—	—	—	3	—	Moonlight and Roses
1965	"It Hurts So Much (To See You Go)" b/w "Wishful Thinking" (from He'll Have to Go)	—	—	—	—	—	—	8	4	10	The Jim Reeves Way
1966	"Snowflake"^{[A]} b/w "Take My Hand Precious Lord" (from We Thank Thee)	2	1	66	—	—	—	—	2	—	Distant Drums
1966	"Distant Drums" /	1	1	45	—	—	27	1	2	3	Distant Drums
1966	"Old Tige"	—	49	—	—	—	—	—	—	—	Talkin' To Your Heart
1966	"Blue Side of Lonesome" b/w "It Hurts So Much (To See You Go" (from The Jim Reeves Way)	1	1	59	15	—	68	—	—	—	Blue Side of Lonesome
1967	"I Won't Come In While He's There" b/w "Maureen" (from The Jim Reeves Way)	1	3	112	—	—	—	12	7	11	Blue Side of Lonesome
1967	"Trying to Forget" /	—	—	—	—	—	—	33	—	—	Blue Side of Lonesome
1967	"The Storm"	16	11	—	—	—	—	—	—	—	The Best of Jim Reeves Volume III
1967	"I Heard a Heart Break Last Night" b/w "Golden Memories and Silver Tears" (from The International Jim Reeves)	9	9	—	—	1	—	38	—	—	The Best of Jim Reeves Vol. IV
1968	"That's When I See the Blues (In Your Pretty Brown Eyes)" b/w "I've Lived a Lot In My Time" (from According to My Heart)	9	10	—	—	5	—	33	—	—	The Best of Jim Reeves Volume III
1968	"When You Are Gone" b/w "(How Can I Write on Paper) What I Feel in My Heart" (from Something Special)	7	7	—	—	1	—	—	—	—	A Touch of Sadness
1969	"When Two Worlds Collide" b/w "Could I Be Falling in Love?" (from Kimberley Jim)	6	7	—	—	4	—	17	—	—	Jim Reeves Writes You a Record
1969	"But You Love Me, Daddy" (with Steve Moore) b/w "Snow Flake" (from Distant Drums)	—	—	—	—	—	—	15	—	—	Jim Reeves and Some Friends
"—" denotes releases that did not chart

=== 1970s and 1980s ===
Year	Single (A-side, B-side) Both tracks from the same album except where indicated	Peak positions				Album
Year	Single (A-side, B-side) Both tracks from the same album except where indicated	US Country	US Cash Box Country	CAN Country	AUS	Album
1970	"Nobody's Fool" /	10	11	4	—	Jim Reeves Writes You a Record
1970	"Why Do I Love You (Melody of Love)"	flip	—	—	—	Talkin' to Your Heart
1970	"Angels Don't Lie" b/w "You Kept Me Awake Last Night" (from Something Special)	4	6	21	—	Jim Reeves Writes You a Record
1971	"Gypsy Feet" b/w "He Will" (from My Cathedral)	16	12	14	—	My Friend
1972	"The Writing's on the Wall" b/w "You're Free to Go" (from I Love You Because)	15	15	20	—	My Friend
1972	"Missing You" b/w "The Tie That Binds"	8	7	13	89	Missing You
1972	"Blue Christmas" b/w "Snow Flake" (from The Velvet Memories of Jim Reeves)	—	—	—	—	Twelve Songs of Christmas
1973	"Am I That Easy to Forget?" b/w "Rosa Rio"	12	10	9	—	Am I That Easy To Forget?
1974	"I'd Fight the World" b/w "What's In It For Me?" (from Great Moments With Jim Reeves)	19	19	43	—	I'd Fight the World
1975	"You Belong to Me" b/w "Maureen" (from The Jim Reeves Way)	54	50	—	—	Songs of Love
1975	"You'll Never Know" b/w "There's That Smile Again" (from It's Nothin' To Me)	71	59	—	—	Songs of Love
1976	"I Love You Because" b/w "Is This Me?" (from The Best of Jim Reeves Vol. II)	54	53	—	—	I Love You Because
1977	"It's Nothin' to Me" b/w "I Won't Forget You" (from Great Moments with Jim Reeves)	14	18	—	—	It's Nothin' to Me
1977	"Little Ole Dime" b/w "A Letter to My Heart" (from Distant Drums)	23	27	—	—	Nashville '78
1978	"You're the Only Good Thing (That's Happened to Me)" b/w "When You Are Gone" (from A Touch of Sadness)	29	28	—	—	Nashville '78
1979	"Don't Let Me Cross Over" (with Deborah Allen) b/w "I've Enjoyed As Much of This As I Can Stand"	10	7	—	—	Don't Let Me Cross Over
1979	"Oh, How I Miss You Tonight" b/w "The Talking Walls" (from Nashville '78)	6	8	40	—	Don't Let Me Cross Over
1980	"Take Me in Your Arms and Hold Me" (with Deborah Allen)	10	15	—	—	Don't Let Me Cross Over
1981	"There's Always Me"	35	35	—	—	There's Always Me
1982	"Have You Ever Been Lonely?" (with Patsy Cline)	5	7	1	82	Greatest Hits
1982	"I Fall to Pieces" (with Patsy Cline)	54	43	41	—	I Fall to Pieces
1983	"The Jim Reeves Medley"	46	43	—	—	The Jim Reeves Medley
1984	"The Image of Me"	70	59	—	—	Special Collection
"—" denotes releases that did not chart

== Notes ==
- A "Snowflake" also peaked at number 9 on the RPM Adult Contemporary Tracks chart in Canada.
- B "Adios Amigo" also peaked at #23 in the UK.
- C "He'll Have To Go" also made the US R&B charts at position #13.
