= 40 Golden Greats (Jim Reeves album) =

Greatest hits album by Jim Reeves
- Released: 1975
- Genre: Pop, rock
- Length: 97:18
- Label: Arcade

40 Golden Greats is a greatest hits album by Jim Reeves. It was released in 1975 and reached number one on the UK Albums Chart, where it was a posthumous number one. Surprisingly, it does not include "I Love You Because".

== Track listing ==
Side one
No.	Title	Writer(s)	Length
1.	"Distant Drums"	Cindy Walker	2:50
2.	"Bimbo"	Glenn O'Dell	2:50
3.	"Am I Losing You"	Jim Reeves	2:18
4.	"Mexican Joe"	Mitchell Torok	2:35
5.	"The Blizzard"	Harlan Howard	3:22
6.	"Gypsy Feet"	Leona Butrum, Nellie Smith	1:40
7.	"I Fall To Pieces"	Hank Cochran, Harlan Howard	3:03
8.	"But You Love Me Daddy"	Pat Twitty	2:09
9.	"Guilty"	Alex Zanetis	3:09
10.	"Missing You"	Dale Noe, Red Sovine	2:35
Total length:			26:31

Side two
No.	Title	Writer(s)	Length
11.	"I Won't Forget You"	Harlan Howard	2:01
12.	"The Hawaiian Wedding Song"	Al Hoffman, Charles E. King, Dick Manning	2:07
13.	"When You Are Gone"	Dean Manuel, Jim Reeves	2:52
14.	"The Storm"	Alex Zanetis, Jim Reeves	2:07
15.	"One Dozen Roses"	Dick Jurgens, Joe Washburne, Roger Lewis, Walter Donovan	1:50
16.	"Not Until the Next Time"	Gail Talley	2:45
17.	"Penny Candy"	Cal Veale	2:32
18.	"Anna Marie"	Cindy Walker	2:16
19.	"He'll Have to Go"	Audrey Allison, Joe Allison	2:17
20.	"Four Walls"	George Campbell, Marvin Moore	2:57
Total length:			23:44

Side three
No.	Title	Writer(s)	Length
21.	"Welcome to My World"	John Hathcock, Ray Winkler	2:32
22.	"Scarlet Ribbons"	Evelyn Danzig, Jack Segal	2:16
23.	"According to My Heart"	Gary Walker	2:39
24.	"Make the World Go Away"	Hank Cochran	2:26
25.	"Crying In My Sleep"	Leona Butrum, Nellie Smith	1:56
26.	"Deep Dark Water"	Jim Reeves	2:24
27.	"I Won't Come In While He's There"	Gene Davis	2:05
28.	"Golden Memories Silver Tears"	Cindy Walker	2:51
29.	"Roses Are Red (My Love)"	Al Byron, Paul Evans	2:45
30.	"Memories Are Made of This"	Frank Miller, Richard Dehr, Terry Gilkyson	2:20
Total length:			24:14

Side four
No.	Title	Writer(s)	Length
31.	"You're the Only Good Thing (That's Happened to Me)"	Jack Toombs	2:15
32.	"The Wreck Of The Number Nine"	Carson Robison	2:14
33.	"Yonder Comes a Sucker"	Jim Reeves	2:30
34.	"How Can I Write on Paper (what I Feel In My Heart)"	Danny Harrison, Don Carter, George Kent, Jim Reeves	2:23
35.	"Have I Told You Lately That I Love You"	Scotty Wiseman	1:27
36.	"Auf Wiederseh'n Sweetheart"	Eberhard Storch, Geoffrey Parsons, John Turner	3:06
37.	"Missing Angel"	Dale Noe	2:09
38.	"Is This Me"	Bill West, Dottie West	2:07
39.	"Angels Don't Lie"	Dale Noe	2:23
40.	"Is It Really Over?"	Jim Reeves	2:15
Total length:			22:49

== Chart performance ==
=== Weekly charts ===
Chart (1975)	Peak position
UK Albums (OCC)	1

=== Year-end charts ===
Chart (1975)	Position
UK Albums (OCC)	5

== Certifications ==
Region	Certification	Certified units/sales
United Kingdom (BPI)	Platinum	300,000^{^}
^{^} Shipments figures based on certification alone.
