= Jim Reeves on Stage =

Live album by Jim Reeves
- Released: 1968
- Genre: Country
- Label: RCA Victor
- Producer: Chet Atkins

Jim Reeves chronology
A Touch of Sadness (1968)	Jim Reeves on Stage (1968)	Jim Reeves—and Some Friends (1969)

Professional ratings
Review scores
Source	Rating
The Virgin Encyclopedia of Country Music	3/5 stars

Jim Reeves on Stage is a live album by Jim Reeves, released posthumously in 1968 on RCA Victor. It was produced by Chet Atkins.

== Track listing ==
Side 1

1. Medley:
  "Mexican Joe" (Torok)
  "Yonder Comes a Sucker" (Reeves)
2. Medley:
  Dialogue
  "Four Walls" (Moore, Campbell)
  "I Missed Me" (Anderson)
  "Tennessee Waltz" (King, Stewart)
  "I Really Don't Want to Know" (Robertson, Barnes)
  "He'll Have to Go" (Allison, Allison)
3. Medley:
  Dialogue
  "Walking the Floor over You" (Tubb)
  Dialogue
  "There Stands the Glass" (Shurtz, Hull, Greisham)
  Dialogue
  "One by One" (Wright, Anglin, Anglin)
  Dialogue
  "Guess Things Happen That Way" (Clement)
  Dialogue
  "I Want to Be with You Always" (Frizzell, Beck)
4. Dialogue
  "Wildwood Flower" (Carter)

Side 2

1. Dialogue
  "The Blizzard" (Howard)
2. Dialogue
  "Your Old Love Letters" (Bond)
3. Dialogue
  "Am I Losing You" (Reeves)
4. Dialogue
  "Bimbo" (Rod Morris)
5. Dialogue
  "Stand at Your Window" (Carroll)
6. Dialogue
  "Danny Boy (Trad. Weatherly)
  Dialogue

== Charts ==
Chart (1968–1969)	Peak position
UK Albums (OCC)	13
US Top Country Albums (Billboard)	5
