= Something Special (Jim Reeves album) =

Compilation album by Jim Reeves
- Released: 1971
- Genre: Country
- Label: RCA Victor

Jim Reeves chronology
Jim Reeves Writes You a Record (1971)	Something Special (1971)	Young & Country (1972)

Professional ratings
Review scores
Source	Rating
AllMusic	2/5 stars
The Virgin Encyclopedia of Country Music	3/5 stars

Something Special is a compilation album by Jim Reeves, released in 1971 on RCA Victor.

== Track listing ==
No.	Title	Writer(s)	Length
1.	"Guilty"	Alex Zanetis
2.	"How Can I Write on Paper (What I Feel in My Heart)"	Reeves; Harrison; Kent; Carter
3.	"Letter to My Heart"	Cindy Walker
4.	"I'm Gettin' Better"	Reeves
5.	"Wild Rose"	Cindy Walker
6.	"Stranger's Just a Friend"	S. Gibson; J. Reeves
7.	"The Blizzard"	Harlan Howard
8.	"Welcome to My World"	Ray Winkler; John Hathcock
9.	"Anna Marie"	Cindy Walker
10.	"I Won't Forget You"	Harlan Howard
11.	"Stand at Your Window"	Jim Carroll
12.	"I'm Gonna Change Everything"	Alex Zanetis
13.	"You Kept Me Awake Last Night"	Reeves
14.	"We Thank Thee"	Jim Reeves

== Charts ==
Chart (1971)	Peak position
US Top Country Albums (Billboard)	13
