= The Best of Jim Reeves =

Compilation album by Jim Reeves
- Released: 1964
- Genre: Country
- Label: RCA Victor

Jim Reeves chronology
Moonlight and Roses (1964)	The Best of Jim Reeves (1964)	Have I Told You Lately That I Love You? (1964)

Singles from The Best of Jim Reeves
- 1. "Four Walls" Released: March 20, 1957; 2. "Blue Boy" Released: June 27, 1958; 3. "Am I Losing You" Released: October 11, 1960; 4. "Adios Amigo" Released: April 7, 1962

Professional ratings
Review scores
Source	Rating
Record Mirror	5/5 stars

The Best of Jim Reeves is a compilation album by Jim Reeves, released in 1964 on RCA Victor.

== Overview ==
The album spent eight weeks on the top of the Billboard country albums chart in August–September 1964 and four weeks at number 3 in the UK in February–March 1965. The album consists of his hit songs.

== Track listing ==
No.	Title	Length
1.	"He'll Have to Go"	2:16
2.	"Four Walls"	2:46
3.	"Guilty"	3:09
4.	"Blue Boy"	2:07
5.	"I'm Gettin' Better"	2:14
6.	"The Blizzard"	3:22
7.	"Am I Losing You?"	2:14
8.	"Billy Bayou"	2:02
9.	"Anna Marie"	2:25
10.	"Stand at Your Window"	2:12
11.	"Adios Amigo"	2:20
12.	"Danny Boy"	2:13

== Charts ==
Chart (1964–1965)	Peak position
German Albums (Offizielle Top 100)	26
Norwegian Albums (VG-lista)	19
UK Albums (OCC)	3
US Billboard 200	9
US Top Country Albums (Billboard)	1

== Awards and nominations ==
Award	Year (Note: Indicates the year of ceremony.)	Category	Result	Ref.
Billboard Country Music Awards	1965	Favorite Album (1964–'65)	Won	
Billboard Country Music Awards	1965	All-time Favorite Album	Won	
Grammy Awards	1965	Best Country & Western Album	Nominated	
