= List of Hot Country Albums number ones of 1964 =

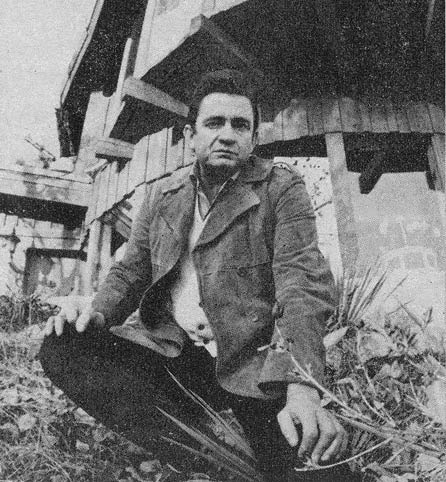
Johnny Cash had the first number one on the country albums chart.

Top Country Albums is a chart that ranks the top-performing country music albums in the United States, published by Billboard. The magazine had published an overall albums chart since 1945, but a chart specifically for country albums was not launched until the issue dated January 11, 1964. During the remainder of the year, nine different albums topped the chart, which was at the time published under the title Hot Country Albums, based on sales reports submitted by a representative sample of stores nationwide.

The number-one album on the first published chart was the compilation album Ring of Fire: The Best of Johnny Cash by Johnny Cash. After a single week in the top spot, it was displaced by Night Life by Ray Price. Cash's album returned to the top of the chart, however, in the issue of Billboard dated February 8 and remained there for 13 consecutive weeks, the year's longest unbroken run at number one. Cash achieved a second chart-topper in August with I Walk the Line, and the total of 18 weeks that he spent atop the chart was the most by any artist in 1964. Cash is regarded as one of the most influential and successful country music artists of all time and his recording career spanned six decades, but his success on the albums chart was largely confined to the 1960s; after 1971 he would not achieve another number one until after his 2003 death.

In addition to Cash, two other vocalists achieved two chart-topping albums in 1964. Buck Owens spent two weeks at number one in January and February with Buck Owens Sings Tommy Collins and six weeks atop the chart with Together Again/My Heart Skips a Beat, which was the year's final chart-topper. Owens was one of the biggest stars in country music in the mid-1960s, achieving a run of 15 consecutive chart-toppers on the Hot Country Singles chart between 1963 and 1967. Jim Reeves spent eight weeks at number one on the albums listing beginning in the issue of Billboard dated July 4 with Moonlight and Roses and the same amount of time in the top spot with The Best of Jim Reeves beginning in the issue dated September 26. Moonlight and Roses was at number one when Reeves died in an aviation accident on July 31. The Best of Jim Reeves also entered the top 10 of Billboard's all-genre albums chart, at the time known as Top LPs, his only release to do so. On the country albums chart he would go on to achieve many more posthumous top 10 hits. Every album to reach number one in 1964 was by a male vocalist; it would not be until July 1965 that an album by a female artist would top the chart for the first time.

== Chart history ==
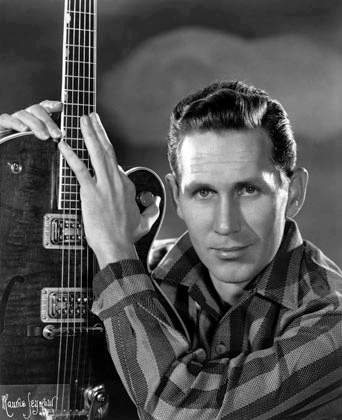
Chet Atkins topped the chart with Guitar Country.

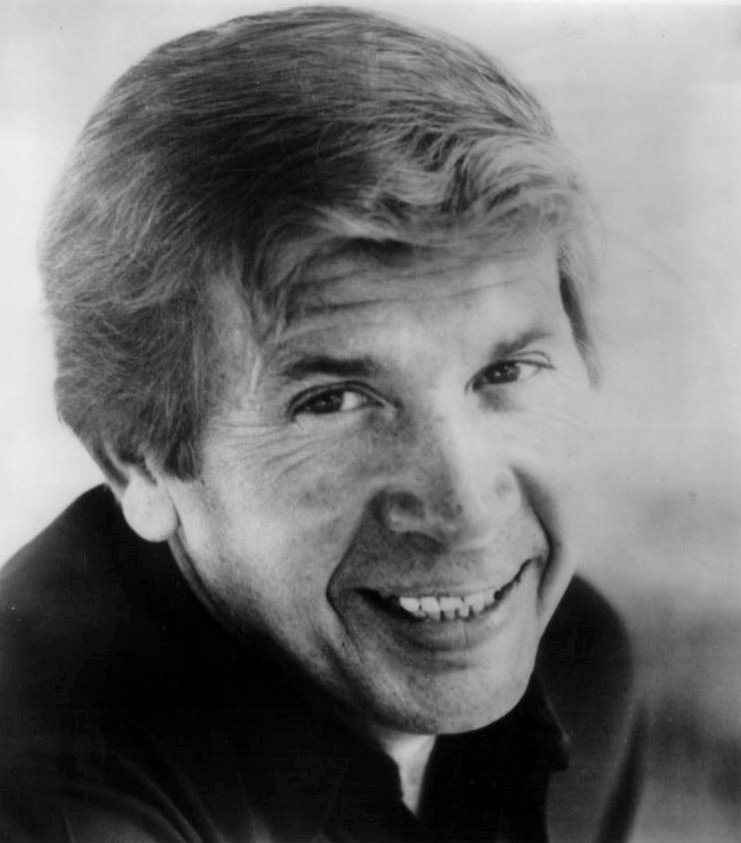
Buck Owens had two chart-topping albums.

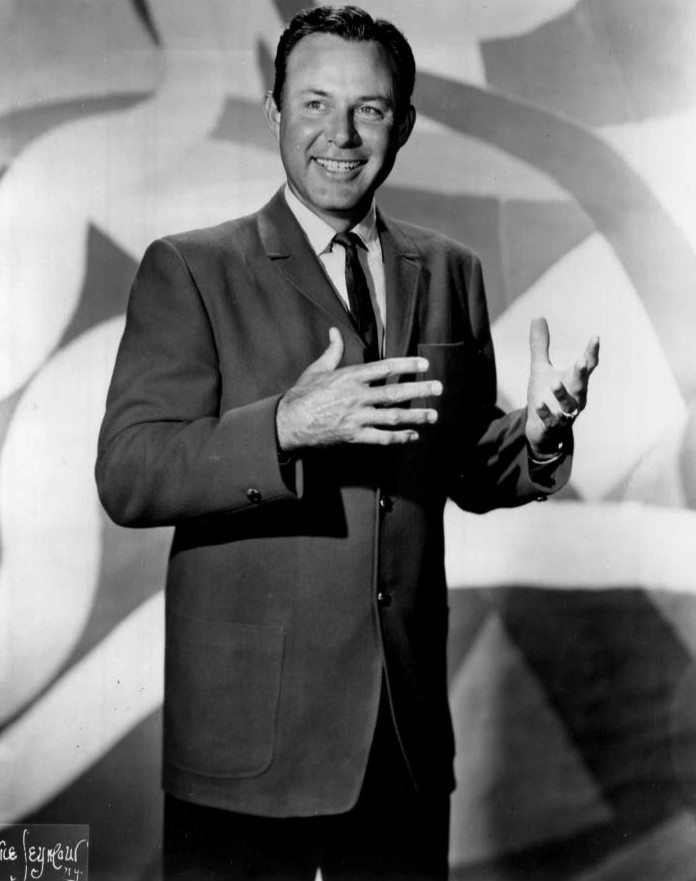
Jim Reeves spent a total of 16 weeks at number one. His album Moonlight and Roses was in the top spot when he died on July 31.

Issue date	Title	Artist(s)	Ref.
January 11	Ring of Fire: The Best of Johnny Cash	Johnny Cash	
January 18	Night Life	Ray Price	
January 25	Buck Owens Sings Tommy Collins	Buck Owens	
February 1	Buck Owens Sings Tommy Collins	Buck Owens	
February 8	Ring of Fire: The Best of Johnny Cash	Johnny Cash	
February 15	Ring of Fire: The Best of Johnny Cash	Johnny Cash	
February 22	Ring of Fire: The Best of Johnny Cash	Johnny Cash	
February 29	Ring of Fire: The Best of Johnny Cash	Johnny Cash	
March 7	Ring of Fire: The Best of Johnny Cash	Johnny Cash	
March 14	Ring of Fire: The Best of Johnny Cash	Johnny Cash	
March 21	Ring of Fire: The Best of Johnny Cash	Johnny Cash	
March 28	Ring of Fire: The Best of Johnny Cash	Johnny Cash	
April 4	Ring of Fire: The Best of Johnny Cash	Johnny Cash	
April 11	Ring of Fire: The Best of Johnny Cash	Johnny Cash	
April 18	Ring of Fire: The Best of Johnny Cash	Johnny Cash	
April 25	Ring of Fire: The Best of Johnny Cash	Johnny Cash	
May 2	Ring of Fire: The Best of Johnny Cash	Johnny Cash	
May 9	Guitar Country	Chet Atkins	
May 16	Guitar Country	Chet Atkins	
May 23	Guitar Country	Chet Atkins	
May 30	Guitar Country	Chet Atkins	
June 6	Guitar Country	Chet Atkins	
June 13	Guitar Country	Chet Atkins	
June 20	More Hank Snow Souvenirs	Hank Snow	
June 27	More Hank Snow Souvenirs	Hank Snow	
July 4	Moonlight and Roses	Jim Reeves	
July 11	Moonlight and Roses	Jim Reeves	
July 18	Moonlight and Roses	Jim Reeves	
July 25	Moonlight and Roses	Jim Reeves	
August 1	Moonlight and Roses	Jim Reeves	
August 8	Moonlight and Roses	Jim Reeves	
August 15	Moonlight and Roses	Jim Reeves	
August 22	Moonlight and Roses	Jim Reeves	
August 29	I Walk the Line	Johnny Cash	
September 5	I Walk the Line	Johnny Cash	
September 12	I Walk the Line	Johnny Cash	
September 19	I Walk the Line	Johnny Cash	
September 26	The Best of Jim Reeves	Jim Reeves	
October 3	The Best of Jim Reeves	Jim Reeves	
October 10	The Best of Jim Reeves	Jim Reeves	
October 17	The Best of Jim Reeves	Jim Reeves	
October 24	The Best of Jim Reeves	Jim Reeves	
October 31	The Best of Jim Reeves	Jim Reeves	
November 7	The Best of Jim Reeves	Jim Reeves	
November 14	The Best of Jim Reeves	Jim Reeves	
November 21	Together Again/My Heart Skips a Beat	Buck Owens and his Buckaroos	
November 28	Together Again/My Heart Skips a Beat	Buck Owens and his Buckaroos	
December 5	Together Again/My Heart Skips a Beat	Buck Owens and his Buckaroos	
December 12	Together Again/My Heart Skips a Beat	Buck Owens and his Buckaroos	
December 19	Together Again/My Heart Skips a Beat	Buck Owens and his Buckaroos	
December 26	Together Again/My Heart Skips a Beat	Buck Owens and his Buckaroos	
