= Yours Sincerely, Jim Reeves =

Studio album by Jim Reeves
- Released: 1966
- Genre: Country
- Label: RCA Victor
- Producer: Chet Atkins, Bob Ferguson

Jim Reeves chronology
Distant Drums (1966)	Yours Sincerely, Jim Reeves (1966)	Blue Side of Lonesome (1967)

Professional ratings
Review scores
Source	Rating
AllMusic	1.5/5 stars
The Virgin Encyclopedia of Country Music	3/5 stars

Yours Sincerely, Jim Reeves is a studio album by Jim Reeves, released posthumously in 1966 on RCA Victor. It was produced by Chet Atkins and Bob Ferguson.

The recording on side one is from Reeves' radio interview that he gave while touring Europe in 1964. According to Greg Adams, who reviewed the disc for AllMusic, the side's track listing "gives the impression that the program is mostly music, but the songs typically appear in excerpts when referenced in Reeves' narration" of his life story. There's also "a snippet of a 1948 newscast Reeves made in his days as an announcer and two nearly complete songs performed during an early radio broadcast." The second side collects complete recordings of popular songs, but, once again, the songs are intermixed with introductions in between. According to the AllMusic reviewer, the short introductions could be taken "from a radio transcription or interview".

== Track listing ==
No.	Title	Writer(s)	Length
1.	"He'll Have to Go"	Audrey Allison / Joe Allison
2.	"Blue Yodel No. 5"	Jimmie Rodgers
3.	"Newscast of 1948"
4.	"My Mary"	Jimmie Davis / Stuart Hamblen
5.	"When Did You Leave Heaven?"
6.	"Mexican Joe"	Mitchell Torok
7.	"Back Up and Push"
8.	"Yonder Comes a Sucker"	Jim Reeves
9.	"The Wreck of the Number Nine"	Carson J. Robinson
10.	"Scarlet Ribbons"	Evelyn Danzig / Jack Segal
11.	"The Fool's Paradise"	Johnny Bond
12.	"Billy Bayou"	Roger Miller
13.	"Am I Losing You"	Jim Reeves
14.	"I Grew Up"	Herbert R. Friedman
15.	"He'll Have to Go"	Audrey Allison / Joe Allison

== Charts ==
Chart (1966–1967)	Peak position
Norwegian Albums (VG-lista)	15
US Top Country Albums (Billboard)	3
