= The Country Side of Jim Reeves =

Studio album by Jim Reeves
- Released: 1962
- Genre: Country
- Label: RCA Camden
- Producer: Chet Atkins

Jim Reeves chronology
Talkin' to Your Heart (1961)	The Country Side of Jim Reeves (1962)	A Touch of Velvet (1962)

Professional ratings
Review scores
Source	Rating
AllMusic	4/5 stars

The Country Side of Jim Reeves is a studio album by Jim Reeves, released in 1962 on RCA Camden.

== Track listing ==
No.	Title	Writer(s)	Length
1.	"A Railroad Bum"	J.A. Balthrop	2:05
2.	"Blue Side of Lonesome"	Leon Payne	3:20
3.	"Waiting for a Train"	Jimmie Rodgers	2:08
4.	"I Won't Forget You"	Harlan Howard	2:02
5.	"My Lips Are Sealed"	Hal Blair / Bill Peppers / Ben Weisman	2:25
6.	"Most of the Time"	Jim Reeves	2:15
7.	"When Two Worlds Collide"	Bill Anderson / Roger Miller
8.	"Yonder Comes a Sucker"	Jim Reeves
9.	"A Fallen Star"	James Joiner
10.	"Highway to Nowhere"	Jim Hess

== Charts ==
Chart (1964)	Peak position
UK Albums (OCC)	12
