= Blue Side of Lonesome =

Blue Side of Lonesome may refer to:

- "Blue Side of Lonesome" (song), a 1966 single by Jim Reeves
- Blue Side of Lonesome (album), a 1967 album by Jim Reeves
