= Treasures (Dolly Parton album) =

Studio album by Dolly Parton
- Released: September 24, 1996
- Recorded: c. June 1996
- Studios: Soundstage (Nashville); 17 Grand (Nashville); The Doghouse (Nashville); The Hit Factory (New York City); Oceanway (Los Angeles)
- Genre: Country
- Length: 41:53
- Labels: Rising Tide; Blue Eye
- Producer: Steve Buckingham

Dolly Parton chronology
I Will Always Love You and Other Greatest Hits (1996)	Treasures (1996)	Hungry Again (1998)

Singles from Treasures
- 1. "Just When I Needed You Most" Released: September 23, 1996; 2. "Peace Train" Released: July 1, 1997; 3. "Walking on Sunshine" Released: August 10, 1999

Professional ratings
Review scores
Source	Rating
AllMusic	3/5 stars
Billboard	(favorable)
The Encyclopedia of Popular Music	3/5 stars

Treasures is the thirty-fourth solo studio album by American singer-songwriter Dolly Parton. It was released on September 24, 1996, by Rising Tide Records and Blue Eye Records. The Steve Buckingham-produced album is made up of covers of rock and country hits from the 1960s, 1970s, and 1980s. It peaked at number 21 on the Billboard Top Country Albums chart and spawned three singles: "Just When I Needed You Most", which peaked at number 62 on the Billboard Hot Country Singles chart; a dance remix of "Peace Train", which peaked at number seven on the Billboard Hot Dance Music chart; and a dance remix of "Walking on Sunshine". The album's release was accompanied by a CBS television special, Dolly Parton: Treasures.

== Background ==
When Parton's contract with Columbia Records expired in 1995, she decided to look for a new label at her own leisure. She initially decided on Atlantic Records because she said Doug Morris was the one executive she met with who fully believed in her. Morris lost an executive battle leading to his departure from Atlantic in 1995. Morris began working with MCA Records in July 1995 by forming a joint venture record label with his Rising Tide Records, which became Universal Records when Morris was appointed chairman and CEO of MCA Music Entertainment Group in November 1995. Parton said she was in no hurry to find a new label, but when Morris began working at MCA she said yes, signing with Universal Records' Nashville branch which had retained the Rising Tide Records name.

== Content ==
Among the selections are songs by Merle Haggard, Jeanne Pruett, Neil Young, Kris Kristofferson, Cat Stevens and Mac Davis. Perhaps the most surprising choices were Young's "After the Gold Rush" (although Parton had previously recorded the song in 1994 with Linda Ronstadt and Emmylou Harris for the second Trio album, though that version would not be released until 1999) and Stevens' "Peace Train", which features Ladysmith Black Mambazo. While this initially seemed to be the oddest pairing, Parton says that for years, she wanted to record "Peace Train" with a big chorus but couldn't find the sound she envisioned. She said, "I was watching TV and this Lifesavers commercial came on, and I heard these beautiful, rich voices. It was exactly the world sound that I wanted. I called [producer Steve Buckingham] and told him to find them, whoever it was. It turned out to be a perfect blend. I was going to record that song regardless of what album I did, because of the shape the world's in."

== Release and promotion ==
Parton premiered the album's lead single, "Just When I Needed You Most", during a September 19, 1996, appearance on The Tonight Show with Jay Leno. It was released to radio on September 23 and peaked at number 62 on the Billboard Hot Country Singles chart and number 68 in Canada on the RPM Country Singles chart. The song's music video was directed by The A.V. Squad and features Alison Krauss and Dan Tyminski who provided harmony vocals on the track.

The album was released September 24, 1996, on CD and cassette.

Parton made an appearance on The Rosie O'Donnell Show on November 27 and performed "Walking on Sunshine".

The album's release was accompanied by a CBS television special, Dolly Parton: Treasures, which aired on November 30, 1996. During the special Parton performed most of the songs from the album, accompanied by video footage of news stories and events from the year of each song's original release.

On July 1, 1997, a dance remix "Peace Train" was released as a single and peaked at number 23 on the Billboard Hot Dance Music chart and number 119 on the Billboard Bubbling Under the Hot 100 chart. It also peaked at number 97 on the UK Singles Chart. A music video was filmed, but was never released. It was directed by Christopher Ciccone, brother of Madonna. The unreleased music video was eventually leaked online.

Following the success of "Peace Train", a remix of "Walking on Sunshine" was released on August 10, 1999, but did not chart.

== Commercial performance ==
The album peaked at number 21 on the Billboard Top Country Albums chart and number 122 on the Billboard 200. In Canada, the album peaked at number 24 on the RPM Country Albums chart. The album also peaked at number 10 on the UK Country Albums Chart and number 116 on the UK Albums Chart.

== Track listing ==
No.	Title	Writer(s)	Original artist	Length
1.	"Peace Train / Isitimela Sokuthula" (with Ladysmith Black Mambazo)	Cat Stevens; Joseph Shabalala	Cat Stevens	4:40
2.	"Today I Started Loving You Again" (with John Popper)	Merle Haggard; Bonnie Owens	Merle Haggard	3:57
3.	"Just When I Needed You Most" (with Alison Krauss)	Randy VanWarmer	Randy VanWarmer	4:36
4.	"Something's Burning"	Mac Davis	Kenny Rogers and The First Edition	3:59
5.	"Before the Next Teardrop Falls" (with David Hidalgo)	Ben Peters; Vivian Keith	Freddy Fender	4:07
6.	"After the Goldrush" (with Alison Krauss)	Neil Young	Neil Young	3:45
7.	"Walking on Sunshine"	Kimberley Rew	Katrina and the Waves	3:11
8.	"Behind Closed Doors"	Kenny O'Dell	Charlie Rich	2:59
9.	"Don't Let Me Cross Over" (with Raul Malo)	Penny Jay	Carl Butler and Pearl	3:03
10.	"Satin Sheets"	John E. Volinkaty	Jeanne Pruett	3:20
11.	"For the Good Times"	Kris Kristofferson	Ray Price	4:16
Total length:				41:53

== Personnel ==
Adapted from the album liner notes.

- Dolly Parton – lead vocals (all tracks)

Special guest performers

- Suzanne Cox – harmony vocal (track 6)
- David Hidalgo – vocal (track 5), accordion (track 5)
- Alison Krauss – harmony vocal (tracks 3, 6), viola (tracks 3, 6)
- Viktor Krauss – aero bass (track 6)
- Raul Malo – harmony vocal (track 9)
- Ladysmith Black Mambazo – vocals (track 1)
- John Popper – vocals (track 2), harmonica (track 2)
- Hargus "Pig" Robbins – piano (track 8)
- John Sebastian – autoharp (track 3)

Musicians

- Eddie Bayers – drums (all tracks)
- Steve Buckingham – acoustic guitar (tracks 1–2, 5), 12-string electric guitar (track 4), baritone guitar (track 4), mandolin (track 4), electric guitar (track 7), baritone guitar (track 7)
- Mark Casstevens – acoustic guitar (tracks 3, 5), high string guitar (track 1)
- Dan Dugmore – lap steel (track 9)
- Paul Franklin – steel guitar (track 10)
- David Hungate – bass (tracks 1–10), upright bass (track 11)
- Pat McInerney – bodhhrán (track 6)
- Farrell Morris – shaker (track 3), marimba (track 5), vibes (tracks 8, 10–11)
- Dean Parks – acoustic guitar (tracks 1, 3–4, 6–11), slide guitar (track 1), electric guitar (tracks 4, 6, 7, 10), 12-string guitar (track 7)
- Don Potter – gut string guitar (track 5)
- Hargus "Pig" Robbins – piano (tracks 9–10)
- Matt Rollings – keyboard (tracks 1, 3, 7), Wurlitzer (tracks 2, 4–5, 8), B-3 organ (tracks 2, 4, 7), piano (tracks 6, 11)
- Joe Spivey – fiddle (tracks 7, 9)
- Adam Steffey – mandolin (track 9)
- Dan Tyminski – additional harmony vocal (track 3)
- Reggie Young – electric guitar (all tracks)

Background vocals

- Matraca Berg – background vocals (track 4)
- Steve Buckingham – reprise (tracks 3, 5)
- Kim Carnes – background vocals (track 4)
- Choir (track 1)
  - Bob Bailey, Matraca Berg, Crystal Bernard, Kim Carnes, Andy Landis, Darci Monet, Louis Nunley, Chris Rodriguez, Duawne Starling, Chris Willis
- Richard Dennison – harmony vocals (track 7)
- Vicki Hampton – harmony vocals (track 7)
- Liana Manis – background vocals (tracks 4–5, 8, 10), harmony vocal (track 11)
- Darci Monet – background vocals (track 4)
- Louis Nunley – background vocals (tracks 8, 9–10)
- Jennifer O'Brien – harmony vocals (track 7)
- Don Potter – reprise (tracks 3, 5)
- Chris Rodriguez – background vocals (tracks 4–5)
- John Wesley Ryles – background vocals (tracks 4, 8, 9–10)
- Dennis Wilson – background vocals (tracks 8, 9–10)

Production

- Steve Buckingham – producer
- Jennie Carey – production assistant
- Don Cobb – editing
- Jeff Demorris – assailant engineer
- Steve Dorff – string arrangement (tracks 1, 8, 11)
- Mel Jones – assailant engineer
- Alison Krauss – background vocal arrangement (tracks 3, 6)
- Marshall Morgan – engineer
- Gary Paczosa – engineer, mixing
- Denny Purcell – mastering
- Ken Ross – assailant engineer
- Toby Seay – engineer
- Al Schmitt – engineer
- Michelle Shelly – assailant engineer
- Ed Simonton – assailant engineer
- Chris Tergeson – engineer

Other personnel

- Tammie Aroyo – additional photos
- Tony Baker – additional photos
- David Blair – hair and makeup stylist
- Tony Chase – costume designer
- Frank Chevalier – clothing stylist
- Gallin-Morey and Associates – management
- Beth Guin – additional photos
- Russ Harrington – additional photos
- Jerry Joyner – designer
- David LaChapelle – photographer
- Daniel Root – additional photos
- Virginia Team – art director

== Charts ==
Album

Chart (1996)	Peak Position
Canada Top Country Albums/CDs (RPM)	24
UK Country Albums (Official Charts)	3
US Billboard 200	122
US Top Country Albums (Billboard)	21
US Cashbox Country Albums	21

Singles

Title	Year	Peak chart positions				
Title	Year	US Bubbling	US Country	US Dance	CAN Country	UK
"Just When I Needed You Most"	1996	—	62	—	68	—
"Peace Train"	1997	19	—	23	—	86
