= Anna Marie =

Anna Marie may refer to:

- Anna Marie (comics), real name of Marvel Comics character Rogue
- Anna Marie (song), a 1958 single by Jim Reeves
