= The Best of Jim Reeves Vol. II =

Compilation album by Jim Reeves
- Released: 1965
- Genre: Country
- Length: 24:10
- Label: RCA Victor

Jim Reeves chronology
Up Through the Years (1965)	The Best of Jim Reeves Vol. II (1965)	Distant Drums (1966)

The Best of Jim Reeves Vol. II is a compilation album by Jim Reeves, released in 1965 on RCA Victor.

== Track listing ==
No.	Title	Length
1.	"Home"	1:57
2.	"Welcome to My World"	2:34
3.	"Then I'll Stop Loving You"	2:20
4.	"Is This Me?"	2:07
5.	"I Guess I'm Crazy"	2:22
6.	"Drinking Tequila"	2:42
7.	"Penny Candy"	2:32
8.	"Mexican Joe"	2:35
9.	"Yonder Comes a Sucker"	2:30
10.	"My Lips Are Sealed"	2:22
11.	"According to My Heart"	2:30

== Charts ==
Chart (1966)	Peak position
US Billboard 200	100
US Top Country Albums (Billboard)	4
