= A Touch of Velvet =

A Touch of Velvet may refer to:

- A Touch of Velvet (Jim Reeves album), 1962
- A Touch of Velvet, a 1967 album by Jimmy Velvet
- "A Touch of Velvet, a Sting of Brass", a 1966 instrumental by Mark Wirtz
