= Trying to Forget =

Trying to Forget may refer to:

- "Trying to Forget", song by Jim Reeves discography#Singles Burnett and Martin
- "Trying To Forget", song by Danny Flores Flores, Taub 1957
