= He'll Have to Go (album) =

Studio album by Jim Reeves
- Released: 1960
- Recorded: February 1957–October 1959
- Genre: Country
- Label: RCA Victor

Jim Reeves chronology
| The Intimate Jim Reeves (1960) | He'll Have to Go (1960) | Tall Tales and Short Tempers (1961) |

He'll Have to Go is a compilation album recorded by Jim Reeves and released in 1960 on the RCA Victor label (catalog no. LPM-2223). The album included two No. 1 hits: "He'll Have to Go" and "Billy Bayou".

Unlike other Jim Reeves albums, this was a compilation of previously issued non-LP singles and EP tracks. In 1962, RCA reissued this album in "electronic stereo" (RCA LSP-2223 (e)). All twelve songs, including the title track, were presented in "electronic stereo" even though "He'll Have To Go" was issued in true stereo on a 1960 single (RCA 61-7643, 1960), and true stereo masters existed for five other songs.

In Billboard magazine's annual poll of country and western disc jockeys, it was ranked No. 4 among the "Favorite C&W Albums" of 1960.

== Track listing ==
Side A

1. "He'll Have to Go" [2:16]
2. "I Love You More" [2:22]
3. "Wishful Thinking" [1:59]
4. "Honey, Won't You Please Come Home" [1:59]
5. "I'm Beginning To Forget You" [2:09]
6. "Billy Bayou" [2:02]

Side B

1. "If Heartache Is The Fashion" [2:23]
2. "Partners" [2:13]
3. "Theme Of Love" [2:04]
4. "I'd Like To Be" [2:00]
5. "After Awhile" [2:08]
6. "Home" [1:58]

== See also ==
- Jim Reeves discography
