= Songs to Warm the Heart =

Studio album by Jim Reeves
- Released: 1959
- Genre: Country
- Label: RCA Victor

Jim Reeves chronology
God Be With You (1959)	Songs to Warm the Heart (1959)	According to My Heart (1960)

Songs to Warm the Heart is an album recorded by Jim Reeves and released in 1959 on the RCA Victor label (catalog no. LSP-2001). The album was produced by Chet Atkins. The cover photograph was by Don Cravens, and the liner notes were written by Don Richardson.

AllMusic gave the album three stars.

== Track listing ==
Side A

1. "Someday (You'll Want Me to Want You)" (Jimmie Hodges) [2:25]
2. "Just Call Me Lonesome" (Rex Griffin) [2:27]
3. "(Now and Then There's) A Fool Such as I" (Bill Trader) [2:11]
4. "'Til the End of the World" (Vaughn Horton) [1:39]
5. "How's the World Treating You" (Boudleaux Bryant, Chet Atkins) [2:22]
6. "Throw Another Log on the Fire" (Charles Tobias, Jack Scholl, Murracy Mencher) [1:55]

Side B

1. "Making Believe" (Jimmy Work) [2:10]
2. "Satan Can't Hold Me" (Frank Katz, Orville Stevens, Paul Gilley) [2:22]
3. "Am I Losing You" (Jim Reeves) [2:14]
4. "Scarlet Ribbons" (Evelyn Danzig, Jack O. Segal) [2:16]
5. "Dear Hearts and Gentle People" (Bob Hilliard, Sammy Fain) [2:02]
6. "May the Good Lord Bless and Keep You" (Meredith Willson) [2:34]

== See also ==
- Jim Reeves discography
