= Good 'n' Country =

Studio album by Jim Reeves
- Released: 1963
- Genre: Country
- Label: RCA Camden
- Producer: Anita Kerr

Jim Reeves chronology
The International Jim Reeves (1963)	Good 'n' Country (1963)	Twelve Songs of Christmas (1963)

Professional ratings
Review scores
Source	Rating
Record Mirror	4/5 stars

Good 'n' Country is a studio album by Jim Reeves, released in 1963 on RCA Camden.

== Track listing ==
No.	Title	Writer(s)	Length
1.	"Don't Let Me Cross Over"	Penny Jay
2.	"There's a Heartache Following Me"	Ray Baker
3.	"The Talking Walls"	Mattie O'Neil
4.	"Little Ole Dime"	Dave Burgess / Jim Reeves
5.	"The World You Left Behind"	Alex Zanetis
6.	"I've Enjoyed as Much of This as I Can Stand"	Bill Anderson
7.	"Lonely Music"	Dave Burgess / Jim Reeves
8.	"Bottle, Take Effect"	Jim Reeves
9.	"You Kept Me Awake Last Night"	Jim Reeves
10.	"Before I Died"	Jim Carroll

== Charts ==
Chart (1964)	Peak position
UK Albums (OCC)	10
US Top Country Albums (Billboard)	13
