= The Best of Jim Reeves Volume III =

Compilation album by Jim Reeves
- Released: 1969
- Genre: Country
- Length: 24:10
- Label: RCA Victor

Jim Reeves chronology
Jim Reeves—and Some Friends (1969)	The Best of Jim Reeves Volume III (1969)	Jim Reeves Writes You a Record (1971)

Professional ratings
Review scores
Source	Rating
AllMusic	3/5 stars
The Virgin Encyclopedia of Country Music	3/5 stars

The Best of Jim Reeves Volume III is a compilation album by Jim Reeves, released in 1969 on RCA Victor.

== Track listing ==
Side A
No.	Title	Writer(s)	Length
1.	"Distant Drums"	Cindy Walker	2:46
2.	"I'm Gonna Change Everything"	Alex Zanetis	1:58
3.	"Pride Goes Before a Fall"	Leon Payne	2:41
4.	"It Hurts So Much (to See You Go)"	Bobby Warren / Billy Guitar	2:07
5.	"The Storm"	Jim Reeves / Alex Zanetis	2:07
6.	"That's When I See the Blues (in Your Pretty Brown Eyes)"	Tommy Blake / Carl Belew / W. S. Stevenson	2:21

Side B
No.	Title	Writer(s)	Length
1.	"Is It Really Over?"	Jim Reeves	2:11
2.	"Missing Angel"	Dale Noe	2:09
3.	"A Fallen Star"	James Joiner	2:39
4.	"Golden Memories and Silver Tears"	Cindy Walker	2:47
5.	"Could I Be Falling in Love"	Alex Zanetis	2:45

== Charts ==
Chart (1969)	Peak position
US Top Country Albums (Billboard)	12
