= Gentleman Jim (album) =

Studio album by Jim Reeves
- Released: 1963
- Genre: Country
- Label: RCA Victor
- Producer: Chet Atkins, Anita Kerr

Jim Reeves chronology
We Thank Thee (1962)	Gentleman Jim (1963)	The International Jim Reeves (1963)

Professional ratings
Review scores
Source	Rating
New Record Mirror	4/5 stars

Gentleman Jim is a studio album by Jim Reeves, released in 1963 on RCA Victor.

== Track listing ==
No.	Title	Writer(s)	Length
1.	"Memories Are Made of This"	Richard Dehr / Terry Gilkyson / Frank Miller	2:20
2.	"Roses Are Red (My Love)"	Al Byron / Paul Evans	2:45
3.	"After Loving You"	John Miller Lantz / Eddie Miller	1:55
4.	"Stand In"	Hal Blair / Don Robertson	2:10
5.	"Waltzing on Top of the World" (Version '63)	Al Courtney / Jim Reeves	2:23
6.	"When You Are Gone"	Dean Manuel / Jim Reeves	2:52
7.	"Just Out of Reach"	Jim Reeves / Virgil F. Stewart	2:36
8.	"I Love You Because"	Leon Payne	2:42
9.	"I'd Fight the World"	Joe Allison / Hank Cochran	2:48
10.	"The One That Got Away"	Buddy Killen / Jim Reeves	2:32
11.	"Once upon a Time"	Jim Reeves	2:33
12.	"I Never Pass There Anymore"	Harlan Howard	2:25

== Charts ==
Chart (1964)	Peak position
UK Albums (OCC)	3
