= Girls I Have Known =

Studio album by Jim Reeves
- Released: 1958
- Genre: Country
- Label: RCA Victor

Jim Reeves chronology
Jim Reeves (1957)	Girls I Have Known (1958)	God Be With You (1959)

Singles from Girls I Have Known
- 1. "Anna Marie" Released: October 30, 1957

Girls I Have Known is an album recorded by Jim Reeves and released in 1958 by RCA Victor (catalog no. LPM-1685). The album was produced by Chet Atkins.

On November 17, 1958, the album was No. 2 on Billboard magazine's "Favorite C&W Albums" based on the magazine's annual poll of country and western disc jockeys.

AllMusic gave the album four stars, and critic Bruce Eder wrote: "Whether it's pop or country, it's all delightful, and of immense importance in the history of country music -- this was one of the very first countrypolitan recordings, utilizing a sophisticated sound that was closer to pop music than to anything previously identified as country music."

== Track listing ==
Side A

1. "Marie" (Irving Berlin)
2. "Mona Lisa" (Livingston, Evans)
3. "My Juanita" (Caroline Norton)
4. "Charmaine" (Rapee, Pollack)
5. "Margie" (Benny Davis, Con Conrad, Robinson)
6. "Anna Marie" (Cindy Walker)

Side B

1. "Sweet Sue, Just You" (Victor Young, Will J. Harris)
2. "Linda" (J. Lawrence)
3. "Ramona" (M. Wayne, L.W. Gilbert)
4. "Maria Elena" (L. Barcelata)
5. "My Mary" (Jimmie Davis, Stuart Hamblen)
6. "Good Night Irene" (Leadbelly)

== See also ==
- Jim Reeves discography
