= Just Out of Reach (of My Two Open Arms) =

Single by Solomon Burke
- B-side: "Be Bop Grandma"
- Released: August 3, 1961
- Recorded: December 13, 1960
- Genre: R&B; soul; country
- Length: 2:35
- Label: Atlantic
- Songwriter: Virgil "Pappy" Stewart
- Producer: Jerry Wexler

Solomon Burke singles chronology
"Keep the Magic Working" (1961)	"Just Out of Reach (of My Two Open Arms)" (1961)	"Cry to Me" (1962)

"Just Out of Reach (of My Two Open Arms)" (sometimes rendered as "Just Out of Reach (of My Two Empty Arms)") is a country song written by Virgil "Pappy" Stewart and originally recorded by his band, The Stewart Family, in 1951. It was a minor country hit for Faron Young in 1952, reaching #10 on the country charts and was also recorded by Patsy Cline and Percy Sledge and many others. The most successful version was recorded by singer Solomon Burke as his second single from Atlantic Records in 1961, becoming Burke's first hit single.

== Background ==
When Burke arrived for his first recording session at the Atlantic Records studio at 1841 Broadway in New York City on December 13, 1960, he was given four songs, including his first Atlantic release, "Keep the Magic Working", which was a flop and "Just Out Of Reach (of My Two Empty Arms)", a cover of a country song written and recorded by Virgil "Pappy" Stewart, that had been a minor hit for Faron Young in 1953 (#10 C&W), and later for Patsy Cline.

Burke figured this did not portend a long future with Wexler and Atlantic: "Here’s the greatest R&B label in the world, and they give me country songs to sing. What are they trying to tell me?." In 2005 Burke recalled: "I started out as a cowboy on Atlantic Records – without a horse! I was the only singing cowboy with a corned-beef-and-pastrami sandwich on white with mayonnaise." Despite his reservations, Burke, "accompanied by smooth backing vocals and an arrangement equal parts Nashville and Nat King Cole, gave it his best." Burke: "I like country music but I don't think it was deliberate. I think it was something we just accidentally happened onto. By my being versatile. By my being able to sing different songs – being able to change my tone quality, having the different octaves. You must remember, I was capable of singing anything." Burke recalled: "They weren’t happy with my rendition, because I felt I had to talk. We did it several times and I kept talking on the record. Mr. Wexler said 'I don’t think that’s gonna work'. At that time Mr. Paul Ackerman and others said 'leave it in. We don’t know what we’re doing anyway. This is something new we’re trying. No black artist has ever done country music before, so let’s see what’s gonna happen'. That was the turning point of my career – after that, international artist worldwide." When recalling Burke's first recording session at Atlantic, Wexler added in 2002: "There was a blizzard the morning we were to do the first recording session with Solomon and I didn't know if I would be able to get into New York. The trains weren't running, but I made it in that morning and there was Solomon, who had come up from Philadelphia. We did four songs in three hours, including 'Just Out of Reach'. After we finished recording, I went into the control room to listen to the playback. I looked around for Solomon, but he was heading out the door. He said he had to get back to Philadelphia while it was still light because he had a job shoveling snow. I think he was getting paid $3.50 an hour. He already had something like eight kids." According to Tony Cummings, "Despite the use of a different arranger at each session Solomon conquered all. His rich, vibrant, baritone voice brought the full majesty of the gospel tradition to a series of intense, moody ballads and laid down the solid groundwork of the soon-to-follow soul music explosion.

== Release and reaction ==
Released August 3, 1961, after the earlier uncharted release of "Keep the Magic Working" b/w "How Many Times?" (Atlantic 2089), "Just Out of Reach (of My Two Open Arms)" (Atlantic 2114) was Burke's first hit, selling over a million copies, and subsequently spent 19 weeks on the R&B charts while climbing to No. 7, as well as crossing over into the pop top 40, reaching No. 24 on November 20, 1961.

Concert promoters in Mississippi, South Carolina, and Alabama, who were unaware that Burke was an African American, accidentally booked him to sing at Ku Klux Klan picnics and rallies, with up to 30,000 hooded Klansmen in attendance. In a 2002 interview Burke recalled: "Way down in the South somewhere, I showed up and the promoter said to me, "Is Solomon Burke here yet?" I said, "Yeah, I'm right here." His eyes grow wide and he walks away. The guy comes back with the sheriff and he says, "Boy, don't play games. Show me some I.D." So he looks at it and pulls the promoter aside and says, "You got a problem. You can't let him go out there." So they called the doctor and had him cover my face in bandages and made it look like I had an accident. That's how I performed that night."

== Impact ==
The song was credited as "fundamental to the emergence of soul music", was "especially well received down South", "successfully appealed to white consumers by using tidy tone quality, minimal improvisation, and standard, middle-American dialect", "instantly established Burke as a huge presence ... [and] "also introduced Burke's slightly country-tinged voice that melded R&B and country music and set the template that Ray Charles would follow the next year with his classic Modern Sounds in Country and Western Music." Burke "summed up the underlying connection between the musics of the black and white South: 'Gospel is the truth. And country music is the truth.'" In 2003 Burke's recording of "Just Out of Reach" was ranked No. 223 on a list of country music's 500 greatest singles.

Burke's version of the song was ranked number 785 among the greatest singles ever made in Dave Marsh's book The Heart of Rock & Soul (1989).

== Cover versions ==
- Johnny Burnette covered the song in 1962 on his album Hits and Other Favourites.
- Brenda Lee covered the song in 1962 on her album Brenda, That's All.
- This song was also covered by Jim Reeves in 1963 for his album Gentleman Jim.
- A version by English comedian and singer Ken Dodd reached #29 in the UK Singles Chart in 1972.
- A cover version by Merle Kilgore peaked at #74 on the Billboard Hot Country Singles chart in 1984.
- This song was also covered by George Jones in 1989 for the album One Woman Man.
- Eclectic Country legend David Ball included a version on his 2001 album Amigo (David Ball album) on the Dualtone Records label.
- New Zealand singer Bunny Walters had an NZ top 20 entry with this song in 1969 / 1970.
