= The Intimate Jim Reeves =

Studio album by Jim Reeves
- Released: 1960
- Genre: Country
- Label: RCA Victor
- Producer: Chet Atkins

Jim Reeves chronology
According to My Heart (1960)	The Intimate Jim Reeves (1960)	He'll Have to Go (1960)

The Intimate Jim Reeves is an album recorded by Jim Reeves (backed by the Anita Kerr Singers and a string section) and released in 1960 on the RCA Victor label (catalog no. LPM-2216). The album was produced by Chet Atkins and arranged by Marty Gold and Cliff Parman.

In Billboard magazine's annual poll of country and western disc jockeys, it was ranked No. 6 among the "Favorite C&W Albums" of 1960.

In July 1964, the album's fourth track, "I'm Getting Better", reached No. 3 on the Billboard country and western chart.

AllMusic gave the album three-and-a-half stars, and critic Bruce Eder called it: "Superb countrypolitan pop by the man who practically invented the format, near the peak of his powers as a singer."

== Track listing ==
Side A

1. "Dark Moon" (Miller) [2:38]
2. "Oh, How I Miss You Tonight" (Davis, Burke, Fisher) [2:05]
3. "Take Me in Your Arms and Hold Me" (Walker) [2:44]
4. "I'm Gettin' Better" (Reeves) [2:14]
5. "Almost" (Toombs, McAlpin) [2:45]
6. "You're Free to Go" (Robertson, Herscher) [2:00]

Side B

1. "You're the Only Good Thing (That's Happened to Me)" (Toombs) [2:19]
2. "Have I Stayed Away Too Long?" (Loesser) [3:01]
3. "No One to Cry to" (Willing, Robin) [2:36]
4. "I Was Just Walking Out the Door" (Walker) [2:12]
5. "Room Full of Roses" (Spencer) [2:40]
6. "We Could" (Bryant) [3:02]

== See also ==
- Jim Reeves discography
