= Sweet Sue, Just You =

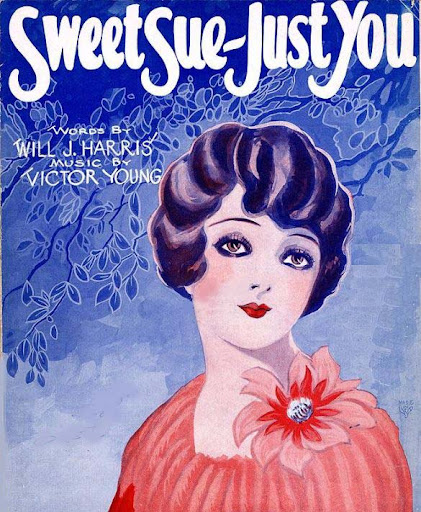
- Sheet music cover, 1928

Song
- Published: 1928 by Shapiro, Bernstein & Co.
- Composer: Victor Young
- Lyricist: Will J. Harris

"Sweet Sue, Just You" is an American popular song of 1928, composed by Victor Young with lyrics by Will J. Harris. Popular versions in 1928 were by Earl Burtnett (vocal by the Biltmore Trio) and by Ben Pollack (vocal by Franklyn Baur).

It has become a popular jazz standard, with versions recorded by many artists. It's also widely popular among jug bands.

The titular 'Sue' refers to actress and talent agent Sue Carol.

== Other recordings ==
- Paul Whiteman and His Orchestra (vocals by Jack Fulton), recorded on September 18, 1928.
- Django Reinhardt - recorded in March 1935.
- Benny Goodman and His Quartet - recorded on November 18, 1936 for Victor Records, catalog No. 25473A.
- The Mills Brothers had a hit with the song in 1932.
- Bing Crosby recorded the song for Brunswick Records on October 25, 1932 but it was not released until 1968.
- Fats Waller - recorded June 24, 1935 for Victor Records (catalog No. 25087).
- Louis Prima And His New Orleans Gang - recorded November 30, 1935 for Brunswick Records (catalog No. 7596).
- Tommy Dorsey and His Orchestra (vocals by Jack Leonard) enjoyed success with the song in 1939.
- Johnny Long and His Orchestra reached the Billboard charts in 1949 with a peak position of No. 19.
- Miles Davis - recorded September 10, 1956.
- Jim Reeves - for his album Girls I Have Known (1958).
- Pat Boone - included in his album Yes Indeed! (1958).
- Jim Kweskin and the Jug Band - included on their debut LP, Unblushing Brassiness (1963).

== Film appearances ==
- 1938 Boys Town - played by a marching band and reprised by a band at the election rally
- 1940 Second Chorus - played by the Perennials
- 1942 Rhythm Parade - sung by The Mills Brothers.
- 1942 The Major and the Minor - sung by chorus of cadets
- 1959 Some Like It Hot - in the score after "I Wanna Be Loved by You"
- 1969 They Shoot Horses, Don't They? - played at the Dance Marathon
- 1979 All That Jazz - danced by Keith Gordon
- 1999 Sweet and Lowdown - performed by Howard Alden
- 2003 Red Betsy - performed by Jimmy Dorsey
- 2012 The Master - performed by Noro Morales

== In popular culture ==
The song was performed by Lucille Ball, Desi Arnaz, Vivian Vance, and William Frawley in the season one I Love Lucy episode "Breaking the Lease" (1952) and again by Ball the season four episode "Mr. and Mrs. TV Show" (1954). It was also played by Ball, Vance, Frawley and Keith Thibodeaux in the season six episode "Ragtime Band" (1957).

The play Sweet Sue by A. R. Gurney features the song.
