= Jim Reeves—and Some Friends =

Studio album by Jim Reeves
- Released: 1969
- Genre: Country
- Label: RCA Victor
- Producer: Chet Atkins, Danny Davis

Jim Reeves chronology
| Jim Reeves on Stage (1968) | Jim Reeves—and Some Friends (1969) | The Best of Jim Reeves Volume III (1969) |

Professional ratings
Review scores
| Source | Rating |
|---|---|
| The Virgin Encyclopedia of Country Music | 3/5 stars |

Jim Reeves—and Some Friends is a studio album by Jim Reeves, released posthumously in 1969 on RCA Victor. It was produced by Chet Atkins and Danny Davis.

== Track listing ==
| No. | Title | Writer(s) | Length |
|---|---|---|---|
| 1. | "Love Is No Excuse" (with Dottie West) | Justin Tubb |
| 2. | "You'll Never Be Mine Again" (with Leo Jackson and Floyd Robinson) | Jim Reeves; Buddy Killen |
| 3. | "How Can I Write on Paper (What I Feel in Heart)" (with Gordon Stoker) | Reeves; Harrison; Kent; Carter |
| 4. | "But You Love Me Daddy" (with Steve Moore) | Pat Twitty |
| 5. | "Are You the One" (with Alvadean Coker) | Jim Amadeo; Don Grashey |
| 6. | "Look Who's Talking" (with Dottie West) | Cindy Walker |
| 7. | "Mother of a Honky Tonk Girl" (with Carol Johnson) | Shorty Long; Bob Newman |
| 8. | "My Hands Are Clean" (with Leo Jackson) | Dale Noe |
| 9. | "I Love You" (with Ginny Wright) | Billy Barton |
| 10. | "Stand at Your Window" (with Leo Jackson) | Jim Carroll |

== Charts ==
| Chart (1969) | Peak position |
|---|---|
| UK Albums (OCC) | 24 |
| US Top Country Albums (Billboard) | 18 |
