= I'm Gonna Change Everything =

Single by Jim Reeves

from the album Have I Told You Lately That I Love You?
- B-side: "Pride Goes Before a Fall"
- Released: 1962
- Genre: Country
- Length: 1:58
- Label: RCA Victor
- Songwriter: Alex Zanetis
- Producer: Chet Atkins

Jim Reeves singles chronology
"Adios Amigo" (1962)	"I'm Gonna Change Everything" (1962)	"You're the Only Good Thing (That's Happened to Me" (1962)

"I'm Gonna Change Everything" is a 1962 single by the American country singer Jim Reeves. It was one of his many country hits in 1962. The song was written by Alex Zanetis, who wrote a lot of country hits.

== Jim Reeves version ==
=== Release and reception ===
After the success of "Adios Amigo" in the last months, "I'm Gonna Change Everything" was released as a seven-inch single in July 1962 by RCA Victor Records. The song was later included in his 1964 compilation album Have I Told You Lately That I Love You?, but not in the UK release of the album. It was backed by another country song written by Leon Payne, "Pride Goes Before a Fall" on the B-side.

The single received a positive reception upon its release. Cashbox reviewed the single in early August and stated that "Reeves, who's been well represented on both the pop and country charts for a number of years now, can have one of his biggest two-market hits to date in 'I'm Gonna Change Everything.' It’s a soft beat cha cha heartbreaker that Reeves dual-tracks in grade 'A' fashion. They noted that "Jim's at his mellow-toned best on the superb, crying towel lilter, 'Pride Goes Before A Fall,'" calling it a "Great pairing." Billboard believed that the "Reeves' velvet pipes are in fine form again on these two sides." They said, "First up is a smart piece of material, done in a more up-tempo style." They called the flip a "mellow ballad effort with a fine teaming of voices and instruments behind Reeves' vocal," noting "Either can move."

=== Chart performance ===
"I'm Gonna Change Everything" by Reeves reached No. 1 on the US Cashbox country chart and No. 2 on the US Billboard country chart. "Pride Goes Before a Fall" also reached both country charts, peaking at No. 18 on the Billboard chart and at a lower No. 31 on the Cashbox charts.

== Cover versions ==
The song has been covered by many country and traditional pop singers:

- Jimmy Roselli released the song as a single in 1966. It reached No. 29 on the Easy Listening, during a seven-week run on the chart.
- Dean Martin's version was first recorded for his country album Dean "Tex" Martin Rides Again and was later featured on his top ten hit The Door Is Still Open to My Heart album.
- Country singer George Jones included the song on his 1965 album I Get Lonely in a Hurry.
- Another country singer, Kitty Wells included the song in her 1966 Songs Made Famous by Jim Reeves, with as the name suggests includes famous Jim Reeves songs.

== Charts ==
Chart performance for "I'm Gonna Change Everything"
Chart (1962)	Peak position
US Billboard Hot 100	95
US Billboard Hot C&W Sides	2
US Cashbox Top Country Singles	1
UK OCC Top Singles	42

Chart performance for "Pride Goes Before a Fall"
Chart (1962)	Peak position
US Billboard Hot C&W Sides	18
US Cashbox Top Country Singles	31

Chart performance for Jimmy Roselli's "I'm Gonna Change Everything"
Chart (1966)	Peak position
US Billboard Easy Listening	29
