= Talkin' to Your Heart =

Studio album by Jim Reeves
- Released: 1961
- Genre: Country
- Label: RCA Victor
- Producer: Chet Atkins

Jim Reeves chronology
Tall Tales and Short Tempers (1961)	Talkin' to Your Heart (1961)	The Country Side of Jim Reeves (1962)

Talkin' to Your Heart is an album recorded by Jim Reeves and released in 1961 on the RCA Victor label (catalog no. LPM-2339). The album was produced by Chet Atkins. Don Richardson Sr. wrote the liner notes.

== Track listing ==
Side A

1. "Trouble in the Amen Corner" (Campbell) [2:58]
2. "I'm Waiting for Ships That Never Come In" (Olman, Yellen) [2:14]
3. "Annabel Lee" (Kerr, Poe) [2:35]
4. "The Gun" (Reeves, M. Burk, R. Burk) [2:48]
5. "The Farmer and the Lord" (Wilson) [2:10]
6. "The Shifting Whispering Sands" (M. Gilbert, V. Gilbert) [5:35]

Side B

1. "Old Tige" (Reeves, M. Burk, R. Burk) [2:54]
2. "Why Do I Love You (Melody of Love)" (Engelmann, Davies) [1:54]
3. "(Far Away Feeling) The Spell of the Yukon" (Kerr, Service) [4:14]
4. "Men With Broken Hearts" (Williams) [2:24]
5. "Too Many Parties and Too Many Pals" (Rose, Dixon, Henderson) [2:33]
6. "Seven Days" (Selman, Reeves) [2:55]
