= Penny Jay =

American singer-songwriter (1925–2006)

- Also known as: Helen (Penny Jay) Moyers
- Born: Helen Florence Adams; June 12, 1925; Monteagle, Tennessee
- Died: March 29, 2006 (aged 80) Nashville, Arkansas, U.S.
- Genres: Country
- Occupation: Singer/Songwriter
- Instruments: Guitar, stand-up bass
- Labels: OKeh, Republic, Decca, Sony
- Formerly of: Jenny & Jill, Jimmy Martin, Skeeter Davis

Penny Jay (June 12, 1925 – March 29, 2006) was an American country music singer and songwriter who was active from the 1940s to the 1960s. She is best known for "Don't Let Me Cross Over", a song she wrote which reached #1 on the country music charts in late 1962.

Penny Jay was born Helen Florence Adams in Monteagle, Tennessee. When her mother Edna Tobitt Adams remarried, they moved to Knoxville, Tennessee and Jay began performing with her mother at church functions at the age of 10. Cas Walker, a Knoxville merchant and host of a radio show on local WROL (which is also credited with helping launch the careers of Dolly Parton and The Everly Brothers) featured Penny Jay performing under the name "Little Miss Helen" when she was 12. Jay became a fixture on the show during the early 1940s playing stand-up bass and guitar.

In the early 1950s, Jay began performing as part of a duo with a friend named Marie Wilson. The pair were billed as "Jenny & Jill", and they recorded several original sides for OKeh Records, including "A Million Other Hearts". Jay also toured during the Korean War for the USO. Her USO tours carried her to China, Japan, Iceland, Greenland, the Philippines, and Hawaii.

Jay moved to Nashville in the early 1960s and began performing and writing songs for other artists. She was signed to Republic Records, but her contract was picked up by Decca Records. She ultimately released eight singles on Decca, including "Just Over The Line", "Lonely And Unwanted", and "Those Kinds of Girls". Jay performed at the Grand Ole Opry and on Roy Acuff's "Midnight Jamboree" radio show broadcast from Ernest Tubb's record shop. Jay's band at this time included her daughter, Sherry Moyers, who was the first female professional country/western drummer in Nashville.

Jay had her greatest success as a professional songwriter. In 1962, she scored a #1 hit on the country charts when Carl and Pearl Butler recorded her song "Don't Let Me Cross Over". Originally released in November 1962, the song reached the number one spot on the Billboard Country Singles chart on December 29, 1962. The song eventually spent 11 (non-consecutive) weeks at number one and went on to become a country-music standard. It has been covered by over 30 artists, including George Jones, Jerry Lee Lewis, and Dolly Parton. Other songs Jay wrote include Skeeter Davis' "Set Him Free", Jimmy Martin's trucker ode "Widow Maker", and many more.

Jay eventually stopped performing in the 1970s and moved to Nashville, Arkansas in 1996 to live with her daughter and son-in-law, guitarist Bobby Chambers. She died in 2006. She was buried in Knoxville, Tennessee.
