= A Touch of Sadness =

Studio album by Jim Reeves
- Released: March 25, 1968
- Recorded: pre-1964
- Genre: Country
- Label: RCA Victor
- Producer: Chet Atkins

Jim Reeves chronology
My Cathedral (1967)	A Touch of Sadness (1968)	Jim Reeves on Stage (1968)

A Touch of Sadness is a posthumous 1968 album of material by Jim Reeves who died in 1964. The album reached No.3 on the US Country chart. The song "When You Are Gone" was released in September 1968 as the first single from the album and peaked at number 7 on the Billboard Hot Country Singles.

== Track listing ==
1. "Where Do I Go to Throw a Picture Away" (Carl Belew)
2. "You Kept Me Awake Last Night" (Jim Reeves)
3. "I'm Crying Again" (Gilbert Gibson)
4. "Oh, How I Miss You Tonight" (Joe Burke, Benny Davis, Mark Fisher)
5. "Lonesome Waltz" (Eddie Pleasant)
6. "Your Wedding" (Jim Reeves, Re Winkler)
7. "When You Are Gone" (Dean Manuel, Jim Reeves)
8. "Missing You" (Dale Noe, Red Sovine)
9. "Honey, Won't You Please Come Home?" (Luke McDaniel, Jim Reeves)
10. "In a Mansion Stands My Love" (Johnny Russell)
11. "I'm Glad You're Better" (Jim Reeves)
