= We Thank Thee =

Studio album by Jim Reeves
- Released: 22 June 1962
- Recorded: 29 & 30 January 1962
- Studios: RCA Victor Studio, 1611 Hawkins St. Nashville, TN
- Genre: Country
- Length: 31:54
- Language: English
- Label: RCA Victor
- Producer: Chet Atkins

Jim Reeves chronology
A Touch of Velvet (1962)	We Thank Thee (1962)	Gentleman Jim (1963)

Professional ratings
Review scores
Source	Rating
AllMusic	3/5 stars
Record Mirror	4/5 stars

We Thank Thee is a gospel studio album by Jim Reeves, released in 1962 on RCA Victor.

== Track listing ==
No.	Title	Writer(s)	Length
1.	"We Thank Thee"	Jim Reeves	2:38
2.	"Where We'll Never Grow Old"	James C. Moore	2:18
3.	"I'll Fly Away"	Albert E. Brumley	2:31
4.	"Across the Bridge"	Walter Scott	2:06
5.	"Have Thine Own Way, Lord"	Adelaide A. Pollard / George C. Stebbins	3:03
6.	"My Cathedral"	Pat Twitty	2:55
7.	"The Night Watch"	Cindy Walker	2:19
8.	"I'd Rather Have Jesus"	Rhea F. Miller / George Beverly Shea	2:43
9.	"Where Do I Go from Here"	Ray Greff	2:29
10.	"Take My Hand, Precious Lord"	Rev. Thomas A. Dorsey	2:20
11.	"This World Is Not My Home"	Traditional	2:43
12.	"Oh, Gentle Shepherd"	Cindy Walker	2:48

== Charts ==
Chart (1964)	Peak position
UK Albums (Official Charts)	17

== Certifications ==
Region	Certification	Certified units/sales
United Kingdom (BPI)	Silver	60,000^{^}
^{^} Shipments figures based on certification alone.
