= Up Through the Years =

Compilation album by Jim Reeves
- Released: 1965
- Genre: Country
- Label: RCA Victor

Jim Reeves chronology
The Jim Reeves Way (1965)	Up Through the Years (1965)	The Best of Jim Reeves Vol. II (1965)

Professional ratings
Review scores
Source	Rating
AllMusic	4.5/5 stars
Billboard	positive ("Spotlight" pick)

Up Through the Years is a compilation album by Jim Reeves, released in 1965 on RCA Victor.

According to an RCA Victor advertisement in Billboard, the album contains "12 songs that trace Jim's career."

The album spent two weeks on the top of the Billboard country albums chart in October 1965.

== Track listing ==
No.	Title	Writer(s)	Length
1.	"I Know One"	Jack Clement
2.	"Tweedle O'Twill"	Gene Autry / Fred Rose
3.	"Little Ole You"	Dave Burgess / Jim Reeves
4.	"Bimbo"	Rod Morris
5.	"Pride Goes Before a Fall"	Leon Payne
6.	"Ichabod Crane"	Jim Reeves
7.	"Young Hearts"	Roy Bennett / Sid Tepper
8.	"That's a Sad Affair"	Redd Stewart
9.	"Jimbo Jenkins"	Bobby Garrett / Jim Reeves
10.	"Two Shadows on Your Window"	Steve Gibson / R. Taylor
11.	"I'm Hurtin' Inside"	Cy Coben
12.	"Nooientjie van die ou Transvaal"	Taffy Kikillus

== Charts ==
Chart (1965)	Peak position
US Top Country Albums (Billboard)	1
