= A Touch of Velvet (Jim Reeves album) =

Studio album by Jim Reeves
- Released: 1962
- Genre: Country
- Label: RCA Victor
- Producer: Chet Atkins, Anita Kerr

Jim Reeves chronology
The Country Side of Jim Reeves (1962)	A Touch of Velvet (1962)	We Thank Thee (1962)

A Touch of Velvet is a studio album by country music singer Jim Reeves with backing from the Anita Kerr Singers. It was released in 1962 on the RCA Victor label (catalog no. LPM-2487). The album was produced by Chet Atkins. It included the No. 2 country single, "Welcome to My World".

In Billboard magazine's annual poll of country and western disc jockeys, it was ranked No. 5 among the "Favorite Country Music LPs" of 1962.

== Track listing ==
Side A

1. "Have You Ever Been Lonely (Have You Ever Been Blue)"
2. "There's Always Me"
3. "Just Walking in the Rain"
4. "Be Honest with Me"
5. "Welcome to My World"
6. "(It's No) Sin"

Side B

1. "I Fall to Pieces"
2. "Am I That Easy to Forget"
3. "Blue Skies"
4. "All Dressed Up and Lonely" (Eddy Shaw)
5. "Wild Rose" (Cindy Walker)
6. "I'm a Fool to Care" (Ted Daffan)
