= Moonlight and Roses (Jim Reeves album) =

Studio album by Jim Reeves
- Released: 1964
- Genre: Country
- Label: RCA Victor
- Producer: Chet Atkins

Jim Reeves chronology
Kimberley Jim (1964)	Moonlight and Roses (1964)	The Best of Jim Reeves (1964)

Moonlight and Roses is an album recorded by Jim Reeves and released in 1964 on the RCA Victor label (catalog no. SF-7639). Chet Atkins was the producer. It was Reeves' first album to reach the No. 1 spot on the Billboard country albums chart. It was the last studio album released in his lifetime.

== Track listing ==
Side A

1. "Moonlight and Roses (Bring Mem'ries of You)" (Ben Black, Neil Moret, Edwin H. Lemare) [2:24]
2. "Mexicali Rose" (Stone, Tenney) [2:26]
3. "Carolina Moon" (Benny Davis, Joe Burke) [2:28]
4. "Rosa Rio" (Cindy Walker) [2:53]
5. "Oh What It Seemed to Be" (Benjamin, Carle, Weiss) [2:52]
6. "What's in it for Me" (Cindy Walker) [2:26]

Side B

1. "Roses" (Glenn Spencer, Tim Spencer) [2:28]
2. "One Dozen Roses" (Walter Donovan / Dick Jurgens / Roger Lewis / Country Washburn) [1:50]
3. "Moon River" (Henry Mancini, Johnny Mercer) [2:27]
4. "There's a New Moon Over My Shoulder" (Jimmie Davis, Lee Blastic) [2:37]
5. "It's Only a Paper Moon" (Rose, Harburg, Arlen) [2:21]
6. "When I Lost You" (Irving Berlin) [2:29]

== See also ==
- Jim Reeves discography
