= Don't Let Me Cross Over =

Single by Carl Butler and Pearl

from the album Don't Let Me Cross Over
- B-side: "Wonder Drug"
- Released: November 1962 (U.S.)
- Recorded: February 26, 1962
- Genre: Country
- Length: 2:57
- Label: Columbia 42953
- Songwriter(s): Penny Jay

Carl Butler and Pearl singles chronology
"Don't Let Me Cross Over" (1962)	"Loving Arms" (1963)

"Don't Let Me Cross Over" is a song made famous as a duet by Carl Butler and Pearl, a husband-and-wife country music duo. Originally released in November 1962, the song needed just four weeks to reach the #1 spot on the Billboard Country Singles chart, and spent 11 (non-consecutive) weeks at #1. "Don't Let Me Cross Over" has become a country-music standard.

Honky-tonk singer Carl Butler is best remembered for "Don't Let Me Cross Over," which Allmusic writer Jim Worbois described as a "country heartbreak song." The song was one of several in which Butler's wife, Pearl, joins him on harmony.

With its 11-week reign, "Don't Let Me Cross Over" was the longest-running No. 1 song for a performer's debut single on the Hot Country Singles (and its successor-names) chart until being matched in May 2013 by Florida Georgia Line's "Cruise."

== Cover versions ==
Two cover versions became successful country singles. The first remake was recorded by Jerry Lee Lewis and his sister, Linda Gail, whose version reached No. 9 on the Hot Country Singles chart in 1969.

In 1963, for the Album Good 'n' Country, Jim Reeves recorded a solo version of "Don't Let Me Cross Over." In 1979, up-and-coming country vocalist Deborah Allen recorded a vocal track, and producer Bud Logan oversaw the remixing of a new musical track. Allen's vocals were added to the existing Reeves' track, and a single was produced and released in late 1979. The Reeves-Allen duet – one of several released as singles – went on to peak at No. 10 on the Hot Country Singles chart, and in addition to becoming one of Reeves' many posthumous hits, would pave the way for the even bigger success of another electronically created duet, "Have You Ever Been Lonely?," with Reeves and Patsy Cline.

The Kendalls also covered the song in the late 1970s. In 1996, Dolly Parton, who'd worked with the Butlers early in her career, included a recording of "Don't Let Me Cross Over" (with harmony vocals by Raul Malo) on Treasures, an album of covers of some of her favorite songs.

The song was later covered in December 1969 by Irish country singer Larry Cunningham and peaked at #7 on the Irish charts.

== Chart performance ==
=== Carl Butler and Pearl ===
Chart (1962–1963)	Peak position
U.S. Billboard Hot Country Singles	1
U.S. Billboard Hot 100	88

=== Jerry Lee Lewis and Linda Gail Lewis ===
Chart (1969)	Peak position
U.S. Billboard Hot Country Singles	9

=== Deborah Allen and Jim Reeves ===
Chart (1979)	Peak position
U.S. Billboard Hot Country Singles	10
