= Have I Told You Lately That I Love You? (album) =

Compilation album by Jim Reeves
- Released: 1964
- Genre: Country
- Label: RCA Camden

Jim Reeves chronology
The Best of Jim Reeves (1964)	Have I Told You Lately That I Love You? (1964)	The Jim Reeves Way (1965)

Singles from Have I Told You Lately That I Love You?
- 1. "I'm Gonna Change Everything" Released: July 26, 1962

Professional ratings
Review scores
Source	Rating
Record Mirror	4/5 stars

Have I Told You Lately That I Love You? is a compilation album by Jim Reeves, released in 1964 on RCA Camden.

Most tracks on this compilation are taken from Reeves' 1956 album "Singing Down the Lane".

== Track listing ==
US version

No.	Title	Length
1.	"Have I Told You Lately That I Love You?"	2:48
2.	"I'm Gonna Change Everything"	1:58
3.	"Waltzing on Top of the World"	2:08
4.	"Oklahoma Hills"	2:23
5.	"Beyond the Shadow of a Doubt"	2:35
6.	"Roly Poly"	2:30
7.	"Each Time You Leave"	2:29
8.	"A Letter to My Heart"	2:39
9.	"Your Old Love Letters"	2:16
10.	"Highway to Nowhere"	2:30

UK version

No.	Title	Length
1.	"Have I Told You Lately That I Love You?"
2.	"Breeze (Blow My Baby Back to Me)"
3.	"Waltzing on Top of the World"
4.	"Oklahoma Hills"
5.	"Beyond the Shadow of a Doubt"
6.	"Roly Poly"
7.	"Each Time You Leave"
8.	"Ichabod Crane"
9.	"Your Old Love Letters"
10.	"Highway to Nowhere"

== Charts ==
Chart (1964–1965)	Peak position
UK Albums (Official Charts)	12
US Top Country Albums (Billboard)	5
