= Carl Butler and Pearl =

American country music duo (1961–1980)

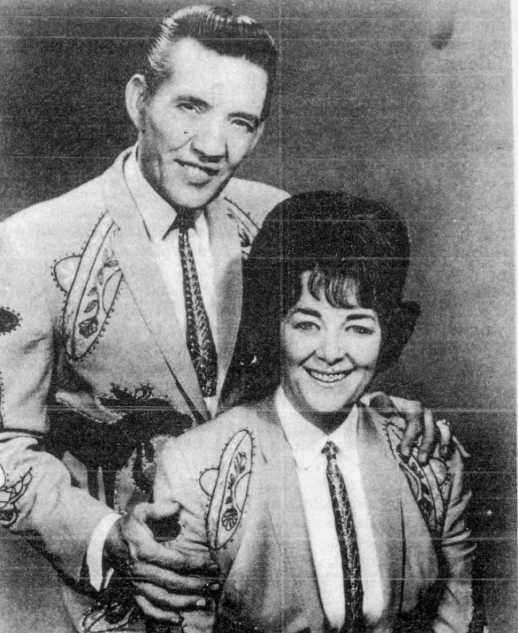
- Carl Butler and Pearl in 1968

Background information
- Origin: Knoxville, Tennessee
- Genres: Country
- Years active: 1961–1980
- Label: Columbia
- Past members: Carl Butler; Pearl Butler

Carl Butler and Pearl were an American country music husband-and-wife duo. Between 1962 and 1969, the duo released several singles and charted thirteen times on the U.S. country charts, reaching No. 1 in 1962 with their first single, "Don't Let Me Cross Over".

== Biography ==
Carl Roberts Butler was born in Knoxville, Tennessee, United States, on June 2, 1927. He grew up influenced by Roy Acuff and the old time music around his home. He began singing at local dances at the age of 12 and, after service in World War II, sang with several bluegrass bands and then as a solo act on numerous radio shows, including the "Mid Day Merry Go Round" on WNOX in Knoxville, Tennessee. During this period he met Pearl Dee Jones, a Nashville native born September 20, 1927, whom he married in 1952.

In 1961, Carl Butler recorded "Honky Tonkitis", which made it to number 25 on the country chart. The following year, the Butlers were invited to join the Grand Ole Opry, and the exposure provided by the show helped them push "Don't Let Me Cross Over" to number one. Their first single as a duo spent almost three months at the top of the country music chart, and they remained one of country music's most popular duos for the next two decades. Later chart records included "I Wouldn't Change You If I Could", "Too Late To Try Again", "Loving Arms" and "I'm Hanging Up The Phone".

Carl Butler was also a songwriter, penning classics including "If Teardrops Were Pennies", a No. 8 hit for Carl Smith in 1951 and a top 10 single for Porter Wagoner and Dolly Parton in 1973, and "Crying My Heart Out Over You" which became Ricky Skaggs' first number one hit in 1981. The Butlers were also among the earliest supporters of Dolly Parton, with whom they had worked in Knoxville in the 1950s, and they helped to get her established in Nashville in the early 1960s. (Parton, in turn, paid tribute to the Butlers when she included "Don't Let Me Cross Over" on Treasures, a 1996 album of covers of some of her favorite songs.)

The Butlers continued to record throughout the 1970s but essentially retired to their ranch, "Crossover Acres", near Franklin, Tennessee, in the early 1980s. They made occasional guest appearances on the Opry until Pearl Butler died at the age of 60 on March 1, 1988. Carl made an unsuccessful attempt at a comeback after her death. He died of a heart attack on September 4, 1992.

== Discography ==
=== Albums ===
Year	Album	Chart Positions		Label
Year	Album	US Country	US	Label
1963	Don't Let Me Cross Over		104	Columbia
1964	Loving Arms	10		Columbia
1965	Old and the New			Columbia
1966	The Great Carl Butler Sings			Harmony
1967	Avenue of Prayer			Columbia
1968	Our Country World			Columbia
1969	Honky Tonkin'	41		Columbia
1970	Greatest Hits			Columbia
1971	For the First Time			Harmony
1972	Watch and Pray			Harmony
1972	Temptation Keeps Twisting Her Arms			Chart
1980	Country We Love			Pedaca
1980	Honky Tonkitis			CMH

=== Singles ===
Year	Single	Chart Positions		Album
Year	Single	US Country	US	Album
1961	"Honky Tonkitis" (Carl Butler)	25		Don't Let Me Cross Over
1962	"Don't Let Me Cross Over"	1	88	Don't Let Me Cross Over
1963	"Loving Arms"	14		Loving Arms
1964	"Too Late to Try Again"	9		Old and the New
1964	"My Tears Don't Show"	36		Our Country World
1964	"I'm Hanging Up the Phone"	14		Our Country World
1964	"Forbidden Street"	23		single only
1965	"We'd Destroy Each Other"	38		Old and the New
1965	"Just Thought I'd Let You Know"	22		Loving Arms
1965	"Beers and Tears"			singles only
1965	"Our Ship of Love"	42		singles only
1966	"Wrong Generation"			singles only
1966	"Little Pedro"	31		Our Country World
1966	"Dreaming of a Little Cabin"			Loving Arms
1967	"For a Minute There"			single only
1968	"If I'd Only Met You First"			Our Country World
1968	"Punish Me Tomorrow"^{A}	28		Honky Tonkin'
1969	"I Never Got Over You"	46		Honky Tonkin'
1969	"We'll Sweep Out the Ashes in the Morning"	63		singles only
1969	"If Teardrops Were Pennies"			singles only
1970	"Used to Own This Train"			singles only
1970	"Bottoms Up"			singles only
1971	"Temptation Keeps Twisting Her Arms"			Temptation Keeps Twisting Her Arms
1972	"She Didn't Come Home"			Temptation Keeps Twisting Her Arms
1973	"Heartaches for Lunch"			Temptation Keeps Twisting Her Arms
1980	"Motel Song"			Honky Tonkitis

- ^{A}"Punish Me Tomorrow" peaked at No. 25 on the RPM Country Tracks chart in Canada.
