= Twelve Songs of Christmas =

Twelve Songs Of Christmas

Studio album by Jim Reeves
- Released: 1963
- Recorded: October 19 and 25, 1962; July 5, 1963
- Genre: Country, Christmas
- Length: 31:30
- Label: RCA Victor
- Producer: Chet Atkins

Jim Reeves chronology
Good 'n' Country (1963)	Twelve Songs Of Christmas (1963)	Kimberley Jim (1964)

Professional ratings
Review scores
Source	Rating
Allmusic	4.5/5 stars

Twelve Songs of Christmas is an album by Jim Reeves released in the US in 1963. It was Reeves' first and only Christmas-themed release. The album was released by RCA Victor in stereo (LSP-2758) and mono (LPM-2758) respectively. The album was first released in South Africa as Merry Christmas from Jim Reeves as an eleven-track album. "Silver Bells" was recorded in July 1963 to create the twelve track US album released in 1963. The album charted for 10 weeks peaking at #15 on Billboard's Christmas Records album chart.

== Track listing ==
=== Side one ===
1. "Jingle Bells" (James Pierpont) – 1:46
2. "Blue Christmas" (Billy Hayes, Jay W. Johnson) – 3:00
3. "Señor Santa Claus" (Lawton Williams) – 2:27
4. "An Old Christmas Card" (Vaughn Horton) – 2:32
5. "The Merry Christmas Polka" (Willie Phelps) – 2:25
6. "White Christmas" (Irving Berlin) – 2:27

=== Side two ===
1. "Silver Bells" (Ray Evans, Jay Livingston) – 2:00
2. "C-H-R-I-S-T-M-A-S" (Eddy Arnold, Jenny Lou Carson) – 1:51
3. "O Little Town of Bethlehem" (Phillips Brooks, Lewis Redner) – 3:29
4. "Mary's Boy Child" (Jester Hairston) – 2:42
5. "Oh Come, All Ye Faithful (Adeste Fideles)" (Traditional) – 2:34
6. "Silent Night" (Franz Xaver Gruber, Joseph Mohr) – 2:34

=== 2001 Reissue ===
Twelve Songs of Christmas was released on CD in 2001 on the BMG Special Products label.

== Charts ==
Year	Chart	Position
1963	Billboard Pop Albums	15
1964	UK Albums Chart	3

== Certifications ==
Region	Certification	Certified units/sales
United Kingdom (BPI)	Silver	60,000^{^}
^{^} Shipments figures based on certification alone.
