= Jim Reeves Writes You a Record =

Studio album by Jim Reeves
- Released: 1971
- Genre: Country
- Label: RCA Victor
- Producer: Chet Atkins

Jim Reeves chronology
The Best of Jim Reeves Volume III (1969)	Jim Reeves Writes You a Record (1971)	Something Special (1971)

Professional ratings
Review scores
Source	Rating
The Virgin Encyclopedia of Country Music	3/5 stars

Jim Reeves Writes You a Record is a studio album by Jim Reeves, released posthumously in 1971 on RCA Victor. It was produced by Chet Atkins.

== Track listing ==
No.	Title	Writer(s)	Length
1.	"Angels Don't Lie"	Dale Noe
2.	"When Two Worlds Collide"	Roger Miller; Bill Anderson
3.	"Nobody's Fool"	Hal Bynum
4.	"My Blinde Hart"	Carstens; Combrinck; de Waal
5.	"The Storm"	Jim Reeves; Alex Zanetis
6.	"Wild Rose"	Cindy Walker
7.	"After Loving You"	Eddie Miller; Johnny Lantz
8.	"Trying to Forget"	Sonny Burnette; Gene Martin
9.	"Ding Dong"	Kikillus
10.	"Seven Days"	Clarence R. Selman; Jim Reeves

== Charts ==
Chart (1971)	Peak position
UK Albums (Official Charts)	47
US Top Country Albums (Billboard)	34
