= Kimberley Jim (soundtrack) =

Soundtrack album by Jim Reeves
- Released: 1964
- Genre: Country
- Length: 28:08
- Label: RCA Victor

Jim Reeves chronology
Twelve Songs of Christmas (1963)	Kimberley Jim (1964)	Moonlight and Roses (1964)

Professional ratings
Review scores
Source	Rating
AllMusic	3.5/5 stars
The Virgin Encyclopedia of Country Music	2/5 stars

Kimberley Jim is a soundtrack album recorded by Jim Reeves for the 1964 motion picture Kimberley Jim, in which he starred. The album was released by RCA Victor.

== Track listing ==
No.	Title	Writer(s)	Length
1.	"Kimberley Jim"	Gilbert Gibson	2:05
2.	"Strike It Rich"		1:59
3.	"I Grew Up"	Herbert R. Friedman	2:23
4.	"My Life Is a Gypsy"		2:28
5.	"Born to Be Lucky"	Taffy Kikillus	1:31
6.	"Old Fashioned Rag"	Leo Friedman	2:19
7.	"Could I Be Falling in Love"	Alex Zanetis	2:49
8.	"Diamonds in the Sand"	Gilbert Gibson / Taffy Kikillus	1:57
9.	"A Stranger's Just a Friend"	Don Gibson / Jim Reeves	1:59
10.	"Fall in and Follow"	Herbert R. Friedman	2:22
11.	"Roving Gambler"	Traditional	1:51
12.	"Dolly with the Dimpled Knees"	Gilbert Gibson / Taffy Kikillus	1:09
13.	"The Boom-Chick Polka"	Taffy Kikillus	1:39
14.	"The Search Is Ended"		2:21
Total length:			28:08
