= God Be with You (album) =

Studio album by Jim Reeves
- Released: February 1959
- Genres: Country, gospel
- Label: RCA Victor
- Producer: Chet Atkins

Jim Reeves chronology
Girls I Have Known (1958)	God Be with You (1959)	Songs to Warm the Heart (1959)

God Be with You is an album of sacred songs recorded by country singer Jim Reeves and released in February 1959 on the RCA Victor label (catalog no. LPM/LSP-1950).

== The sessions ==
The album was Reeves' first of sacred songs. He recorded the album shortly after signing a five-year extension of his contract with RCA Victor. In a single three-hour session on September 9, 1958, he recorded six standards: "God Be With You", "A Beautiful Life", "In the Garden", "Precious Memories", "Whispering Hope", and "The Flowers, the Sunset, the Trees".

At the September 9 session, Reeves was backed by a woman guitarist Velma Williams Smith. At that time, there were no women working as session musicians in Nashville, and Smith later recalled that when she showed up at the September 9 session, Reeves gave her a look as if to say, "I bet this is gonna be good." Smith went on to work on many of Reeves' records.

== Reception ==
On the album's release, Billboard wrote: "He does a top notch job. Performances are sincere and skilled, and the recording job by Chet Atkins is excellent."

Biographer Larry Jordan wrote that Reeves was at his "most moving" when singing sacred songs, citing "Evening Prayer" and "God Be With You" as prime examples. Of the songs recorded at the September 9, 1958 session, Jordan wrote: "The religious songs he mastered that day have been enjoyed countless times by legions of his fans in the ensuing decades.

== Track listing ==
Side A

1. "How Long Has It Been" (Mosie Lister)
2. "A Beautiful Life" (William M. Golden)
3. "Teach Me How to Pray" (Kathryn Twitty)
4. "In the Garden" (C. Austin Miles)
5. "The Flowers, the Sunset, the Trees" (Mattie O'Neil)
6. "It Is No Secret" (Stuart Hamblen)

Side B

1. "Padre of Old San Antone" (Tim Spencer)
2. "Precious Memories" (J.F.G. Wright)
3. "Suppertime" (Ira Stanphill)
4. "Whispering Hope" (Alice Hawthorne)
5. "Evening Prayer" (Battersby, Gabriel)
6. "God Be with You" (Rankin, Tomer)
