= Tall Tales and Short Tempers =

Studio album by Jim Reeves
- Released: 1961
- Genre: Country
- Label: RCA Victor
- Producer: Chet Atkins

Jim Reeves chronology
He'll Have to Go (1960)	Tall Tales and Short Tempers (1961)	Talkin' to Your Heart (1961)

Tall Tales and Short Tempers is an album recorded by Jim Reeves and released in 1961 on the RCA Victor label (catalog no. LPM-2284). Chet Atkins was the producer.

In Billboard magazine's annual poll of country and western disc jockeys, it was ranked No. 6 among the "Favorite C&W Albums" of 1961.

The album's opening track, "The Blizzard", reached No. 4 on the Billboard country and western chart in March 1961.

== Track listing ==
Side A

1. "The Blizzard" (Howard) [3:22]
2. "The Streets of Laredo" (traditional) [3:05]
3. "That Silver-Haired Daddy of Mine" (Autry, Long) [3:15]
4. "Rodger Young" (Loesser) [3:21]
5. "The Fool's Paradise" (Bond) [3:17]

Side B

1. "It's Nothin' to Me" (Patterson) [2:21]
2. "The Mighty Everglades" (Davis) [2:46]
3. "Danny Boy" (Weatherly) [2:13]
4. "The Letter Edged in Black" (Carter) [2:24]
5. "The Tie That Binds" (traditional) [2:50]
6. "The Wreck of the Number Nine" (Robison) [2:17]
