= My Cathedral =

Studio album by Jim Reeves
- Released: October 23, 1967
- Genre: Country
- Length: 28:51
- Label: RCA Victor
- Producer: Chet Atkins

Jim Reeves chronology
Blue Side of Lonesome (1967)	My Cathedral (1967)	A Touch of Sadness (1968)

Professional ratings
Review scores
Source	Rating
The Virgin Encyclopedia of Country Music	3/5 stars

My Cathedral is a gospel studio album by Jim Reeves, released posthumously on October 23, 1967, on RCA Victor. It was produced by Chet Atkins.

== Track listing ==
No.	Title	Writer(s)	Length
1.	"Where Do I Go from Here"	Ray Greff	2:31
2.	"Mary's Little Boy Child"	Jester Hairston	3:09
3.	"Beyond the Clouds"		3:09
4.	"(Make Me Wonderful) In Her Eyes"		3:05
5.	"Teach Me How to Pray"	Kathy Twitty	1:40
6.	"May the Good Lord Bless and Keep You"	Meredith Willson	2:35
7.	"My Cathedral"	Pat Twitty	2:55
8.	"He Will"	Jim Reeves	2:39
9.	"The Flowers, the Sunset, the Trees"	Mattie O'Neal	2:16
10.	"The Farmer and the Lord"	Jim Wilson	2:11
11.	"I've Lived a Lot in My Time"	Jim Reeves / Allen Reynolds / Jack Rhodes	2:41
Total length:			28:51

== Charts ==
Chart (1967)	Peak position
US Top Country Albums (Billboard)	39
Chart (1970–1971)	Peak position
UK Albums (OCC)	48
