= Blue Boy (song) =

Single by Jim Reeves

from the album The Best of Jim Reeves
- B-side: Theme Of Love (I Love To Say, "I Love You")
- Released: 1958
- Recorded: 1958
- Genre: Country
- Length: 2:07
- Label: RCA Victor
- Songwriter(s): Boudleaux Bryant

Jim Reeves singles chronology
| "I Love You More" (1958) | "Blue Boy" (1958) | "Theme of Love" (1958) |

"Blue Boy" is a song written by Boudleaux Bryant, sung by Jim Reeves, and released on the RCA Victor label. In July 1958, it peaked at No. 2 on Billboard's country and western jockey chart. It spent 22 weeks on the charts and was also ranked No. 10 on Billboard's 1958 year-end country and western chart. On the Hot 100, "Blue Boy" peaked at No. 45.

The song was originally recorded by Anita Carter as "Blue Doll" b/w "Go Away Johnnie" on Cadence 1333, released August, 1957. The single did not chart.

The song has been included on multiple compilation albums, including He'll Have to Go & Other Hits (1960), The Best of Jim Reeves (1964), The Unforgettable Jim Reeves (1976), Country U.S.A.: 1958 (1989), and The Essential Jim Reeves (1995).

== See also ==
- Billboard year-end top 50 country & western singles of 1958
