= The International Jim Reeves =

Studio album by Jim Reeves
- Released: 1963
- Genre: Country
- Length: 28:20
- Label: RCA Victor

Jim Reeves chronology
Gentleman Jim (1963)	The International Jim Reeves (1963)	Good 'n' Country (1963)

Professional ratings
Review scores
Source	Rating
New Record Mirror	4/5 stars

The International Jim Reeves is a 1963 album by Jim Reeves RCA Victor – LPM/LSP-2704. "Auf wiederseh'n Sweetheart" and "Blue Canadian Rockies" were released as singles.

== Track listing ==
1. "Auf Wiederseh'n Sweetheart" 3:01
2. "The Old Kalahari" 2:07 “Die Ou Kalahari”
3. "(There'll Be Bluebirds Over) The White Cliffs of Dover" 2:57
4. "True" 2:31 song by Cindy Walker
5. "I'm Crying Again" 1:58 “Ek Verlang Na Jou”
6. "Guilty" song by Alex Zanetis 3:09
7. "Blue Canadian Rockies" 2:36
8. "The Hawaiian Wedding Song" 2:05
9. "You Are My Love" 1:39 “Jy Is My Liefling” (Jim Reeves - C Cooper - W Cooper),
10. "Heartbreak in Silhouette" 3:04
11. "Tahiti" 2:26, Afrikaans song
12. "Golden Memories and Silver Tears" 2:47 Cindy Walker
