= According to My Heart =

Studio album by Jim Reeves
- Released: 1960
- Genre: Country
- Length: 21:20
- Label: RCA Camden

Jim Reeves chronology
Songs to Warm the Heart (1959)	According to My Heart (1960)	The Intimate Jim Reeves (1960)

According to My Heart is an album by Jim Reeves originally released in 1960 on RCA Camden. It was the first of two number-one albums in the UK for American singer Jim Reeves. It spent four weeks at the top of the chart in 1969, five years after Reeves had died. In Billboard magazine's annual poll of country and western disc jockeys, it was ranked No. 10 among the "Favorite C&W Albums" of 1960.

== Track listing ==
=== Side one ===
1. "According to My Heart" (Gary Walker) – 2:25
2. "Don't You Want to Be My Girl (Poor Little Doll)" (Leona Butrum, Nellie Smith) – 1:49
3. "Don't Tell Me" (Ginger Willis, Hal Willis, Vernon Dee, Jim Reeves) – 2:35
4. "You'll Never Be Mine Again" (Buddy Killen, Jim Reeves) – 2:11
5. "I've Lived a Lot in My Time" (Dick Reynolds, Jack Rhodes, Jim Reeves) – 2:40

=== Side two ===
1. "If You Were Mine" (Cy Coben) – 2:20
2. "Don't Ask Me Why" (Joan Hager) – 2:30
3. "Stand at Your Window" (Jim Carroll) – 2:40
4. "What Would You Do" (Jim Reeves) – 2:00
5. "I Can't Fly" (Tommy Hill) – 2:25

== Charts ==
Chart performance for According to My Heart
Chart (1969)	Peak position
UK Albums (OCC)	1
