= The Wreck of the Number Nine =

Song performed by Jim Reeves

Single by Vernon Dalhart
- B-side: "Wreck of the Royal Palm"
- Released: 1927
- Genre: train song
- Label: Silvertone
- Songwriter: Carson Robison

"The Wreck of the Number Nine" is an American train song, part of a subgenre about train wrecks.

It was written by Carson Robison in 1927, and popularized by Vernon Dalhart.

One of the best-known version is by Jim Reeves, from his 1961 album Tall Tales and Short Tempers, although it has been sung by several other singers, including Hank Snow, Marty Robbins, Doc Watson and Mac Wiseman.

It tells the story of a brave engineer who takes his train out on a stormy night after kissing his sweetheart goodbye, promising to marry her the next day, but he is killed in a head-on collision with another train. Unlike some other songs in the "train wreck" subgenre, it has a known author and is based on a fictional incident.

Music historian Bill C. Malone describes Robison's composition as an "event" song that is "a throwback to the British broadside and perhaps most characteristic of the hillbilly music of the twenties".
