= Blue Side of Lonesome (album) =

Studio album by Jim Reeves
- Released: April 24, 1967
- Genre: Country
- Label: RCA Victor
- Producer: Chet Atkins

Jim Reeves chronology
Yours Sincerely, Jim Reeves (1966)	Blue Side of Lonesome (1967)	My Cathedral (1967)

Professional ratings
Review scores
Source	Rating
AllMusic	4.5/5 stars
Billboard	"Spotlight" pick
The Virgin Encyclopedia of Country Music	3/5 stars

Blue Side of Lonesome is a studio album by Jim Reeves, released posthumously on April 24, 1967, on RCA Victor. The album was produced by Chet Atkins.

== Track listing ==
No.	Title	Writer(s)	Length
1.	"Blue Side of Lonesome"	Leon Payne	2:39
2.	"I Catch Myself Crying"	Roger Miller	2:35
3.	"Trying to Forget"	Sonny Burnette / Gene Martin	1:41
4.	"I Know One"	Jack Clement	2:01
5.	"Seabreeze"	James Joiner	2:09
6.	"I Won't Come in While He's There"	Gene Davis	2:05
7.	"Blue Without My Baby"	Paddy Roberts	2:33
8.	"Teardrops on the Rocks"	Bobby Bare / Charlie Williams	2:40
9.	"Crying Is My Favorite Mood"	Jim Reeves	2:45
10.	"Deep Dark Water"	Jim Reeves	2:24

== Charts ==
Chart (1967)	Peak position
Norwegian Albums (VG-lista)	15
US Billboard 200	185
US Top Country Albums (Billboard)	3
