= I Won't Come In While He's There =

Single by Jim Reeves

from the album The Blue Side of Lonesome
- B-side: "Maureen"
- Released: December 1966
- Genre: Country
- Label: RCA
- Songwriter: Gene Davis
- Producer: Chet Atkins

Jim Reeves singles chronology
"Blue Side of Lonesome" (1966)	"I Won't Come In While He's There" (1966)	"The Storm" (1967)

"I Won't Come In While He's There" is a 1967 posthumous single by Jim Reeves, recorded in the RCA Victor studios in Nashville, Tennessee on May 18, 1964. It was one of the last songs Reeves recorded before his premature death on July 31; the flip side of the single, "Maureen", was the last (recorded July 2, 1964). The single was Reeves' sixth and final posthumous release to hit number one on the U.S. country chart. "I Won't Come In While He's There" spent a single week at number one and total of twelve weeks on the country chart. The piano backing is a strong feature of the recording. Although it sounds like Floyd Cramer's characteristic style, and Cramer was Reeves' usual pianist, in this case the player was the blind pianist Hargus "Pig" Robbins.

== Chart performance ==
Chart (1967)	Peak position
U.S. Billboard Hot Country Singles	1
U.S. Billboard Bubbling Under Hot 100	12
