= Missing You (Red Sovine song) =

Single by Webb Pierce
- A-side: "Bye Bye Love"
- Released: 1957
- Genre: Country
- Length: 2:12
- Label: Decca
- Songwriters: Dale Noe & Red Sovine

"Missing You"

Single by Ray Peterson
- A-side: "You Thrill Me"
- Released: 1961
- Genre: Traditional pop
- Length: 2:45
- Label: Dunes
- Songwriters: Dale Noe & Red Sovine

"Missing You" is a song written by Red Sovine and Dale Noe, which was originally released by Red Sovine in 1955, and was later a hit single for Webb Pierce in 1957, Ray Peterson in 1961, and was posthumously a hit for Jim Reeves in 1972. Sovine's version was the B-side of Red Sovine and Webb Pierce's hit single "Why Baby Why".

== Webb Pierce version ==
In 1957, Webb Pierce released a version of the song, as the B-side of "Bye Bye Love". Pierce's version reached No. 7 on Billboard's chart of "Most Played C&W by Jockeys", while reaching No. 8 on Billboard's chart of "C&W Best Selling in Stores", in a tandem ranking with its A-side, "Bye Bye Love".

== Ray Peterson version ==
In 1961, Ray Peterson released a version of the song as a single. Peterson's version spent 15 weeks on the Billboard Hot 100 chart peaking at No. 29, while reaching No. 7 on Billboard's Easy Listening chart, and No. 6 on Canada's CHUM Hit Parade. Peterson's version of "Missing You" was ranked No. 90 on Billboard's end of year "Hot 100 for 1961 - Top Sides of the Year".

== Jim Reeves version ==
Jim Reeves recorded "Missing You" in his last recording session on July 2, 1964. In 1968, Reeves's version was released posthumously on his album A Touch of Sadness. In 1972, Reeves's version of the song was released as the lead track on his album Missing You and as a single. The single spent 16 weeks on Billboard's Hot Country Singles chart, reaching No. 8, while reaching No. 13 on Canada's RPM's "The Programmers Country Playlist". The album, Missing You, reached No. 9 on Billboard's "Hot Country LP's" chart.

== Other versions ==
- In 1965, Australian singer Tony Worsley released a version of the song, which reached No. 8 in Australia.
- In 1968, Mel Tillis released a version of the song on his album Let Me Talk to You.
