= Distant Drums (song) =

1963 song by Cindy Walker

Single by Roy Orbison
- B-side: "Falling"
- Released: May 1963
- Recorded: January 4, 1963
- Genre: Pop
- Length: 3:11
- Label: Monument
- Songwriter: Cindy Walker
- Producer: Fred Foster

"Distant Drums"

Single by Jim Reeves

from the album Distant Drums
- B-side: "Old Tige"
- Released: March 8, 1966
- Recorded: c. 1963 (original); March 1965 and February 1966 (overdubs for commercial release)
- Genre: Country
- Label: RCA
- Songwriter: Cindy Walker
- Producer: Chet Atkins

Jim Reeves singles chronology
"Snowflake" (1966)	"Distant Drums" (1966)	"Blue Side of Lonesome" (1966)

"Distant Drums" is a song written by Cindy Walker and most famously recorded by American country music artist Jim Reeves.

In the US, the song was released in the spring of 1966. It reached number one in both the US and the UK.

Across the Atlantic, the song entered the UK top 40 charts in late August 1966 before climbing up the hit parade until it reached No. 1 by the end of September (where it remained for five weeks). By February 1967, it was still listed in the charts at No. 40.

"Distant Drums" remained in the UK Singles Chart for 25 weeks and stayed atop the US country chart for 4 weeks. It was Reeves' most successful posthumous single.

== Legacy ==
Although Roy Orbison had recorded the song in 1963, it is Reeves' version of "Distant Drums" which has endured over the years.

During its time at the top of the UK chart, the song beat off stiff competition from several major (and living) artists of the day. These included The Beatles - who had entered the UK chart around the same time with their double A-sided release "Eleanor Rigby"/"Yellow Submarine" - and the Small Faces, who had also charted in the UK with "All or Nothing".

It was an unexpected achievement for a song that Reeves had recorded for its composer, Cindy Walker, under the impression it was for her private use only and had earlier been dismissed by both the RCA record company and Chet Atkins (a noted guitarist and record producer who worked with Reeves) as unsuitable for wider public release.

Following Reeves' death, the track was overdubbed with an orchestral backing and released to the public as the version that later climbed up the music charts in both the United States and the UK.

"Distant Drums" first entered the UK Singles Chart during the summer of 1966, before reaching the No. 1 position on 22 September, where it remained for five weeks.

It was named the UK's "song of the year" and Reeves became the first overseas performer to receive this special award.

"Distant Drums" remained at No. 1 on the UK Singles Chart for a total of five weeks. Only Tom Jones with his recording of "Green, Green Grass of Home" had a longer tenure as the UK's top hit single record of 1966, with seven weeks at No. 1, although three of those weeks were in early 1967.

== Chart performance ==
=== Roy Orbison ===
Chart (1963)	Peak position
Australian ARIA Chart	3

=== Jim Reeves ===
Chart (1966)	Peak position
Australia	100
Canadian RPM Top Singles	27
Germany Singles Chart	37
Irish Singles Chart	3
Norway Singles Chart	2
UK Singles Chart	1
US Billboard Hot Country Singles	1
US Billboard Hot 100	45

=== Vic Dana ===
Chart (1966)	Peak position
U.S. Billboard Bubbling Under-Hot Singles	14
U.S. Billboard Adult Contemporary	33

== See also ==
- List of posthumous number-one singles (UK)
