= When You Are Gone =

Single by Jim Reeves

from the album A Touch of Sadness
- B-side: "How Can I Write on Paper (What I Feel in My Heart)"
- Released: September 1968
- Genre: Country
- Label: RCA
- Songwriter(s): Dean Manuel; Jim Reeves

Jim Reeves singles chronology
"That's When I See the Blues" (1968)	"When You Are Gone" (1968)	"When Two Worlds Collide" (1969)

"When You Are Gone" is a single by American country music artist Jim Reeves. Released in September 1968, it was the first single from his album A Touch of Sadness. The song peaked at number 7 on the Billboard Hot Country Singles chart. It also reached number 1 on the RPM Country Tracks chart in Canada.

== Chart performance ==
Chart (1968)	Peak position
U.S. Billboard Hot Country Singles	7
Canadian RPM Country Tracks	1
