= I Won't Forget You (Jim Reeves song) =

Single by Jim Reeves
- A-side: "I Won't Forget You"
- B-side: "A Stranger's Just a Friend"
- Released: June 14, 1964
- Genre: Country
- Length: 1:59
- Label: RCA Victor
- Songwriter(s): Harlan Howard

Jim Reeves singles chronology
"There's a Heartache Following Me" (1964)	"I Won't Forget You" (1964)	"How Long Has It Been" (1965)

"I Won't Forget You" is a single by American singer Jim Reeves. It was released in 1964 by RCA Victor and peaked at number three on the UK Singles Chart. It was the 56th biggest-selling single in the United Kingdom during the 1960s.

== Track listing ==
1. "I Won't Forget You"
2. "A Stranger's Just a Friend"

== Chart performance ==
Chart (1964)	Peak position
UK Singles (OCC)	3
US Hot Country Songs (Billboard)	3
US Billboard Hot 100	93
