= Danny Boy =

1913 song by Frederic Weatherly

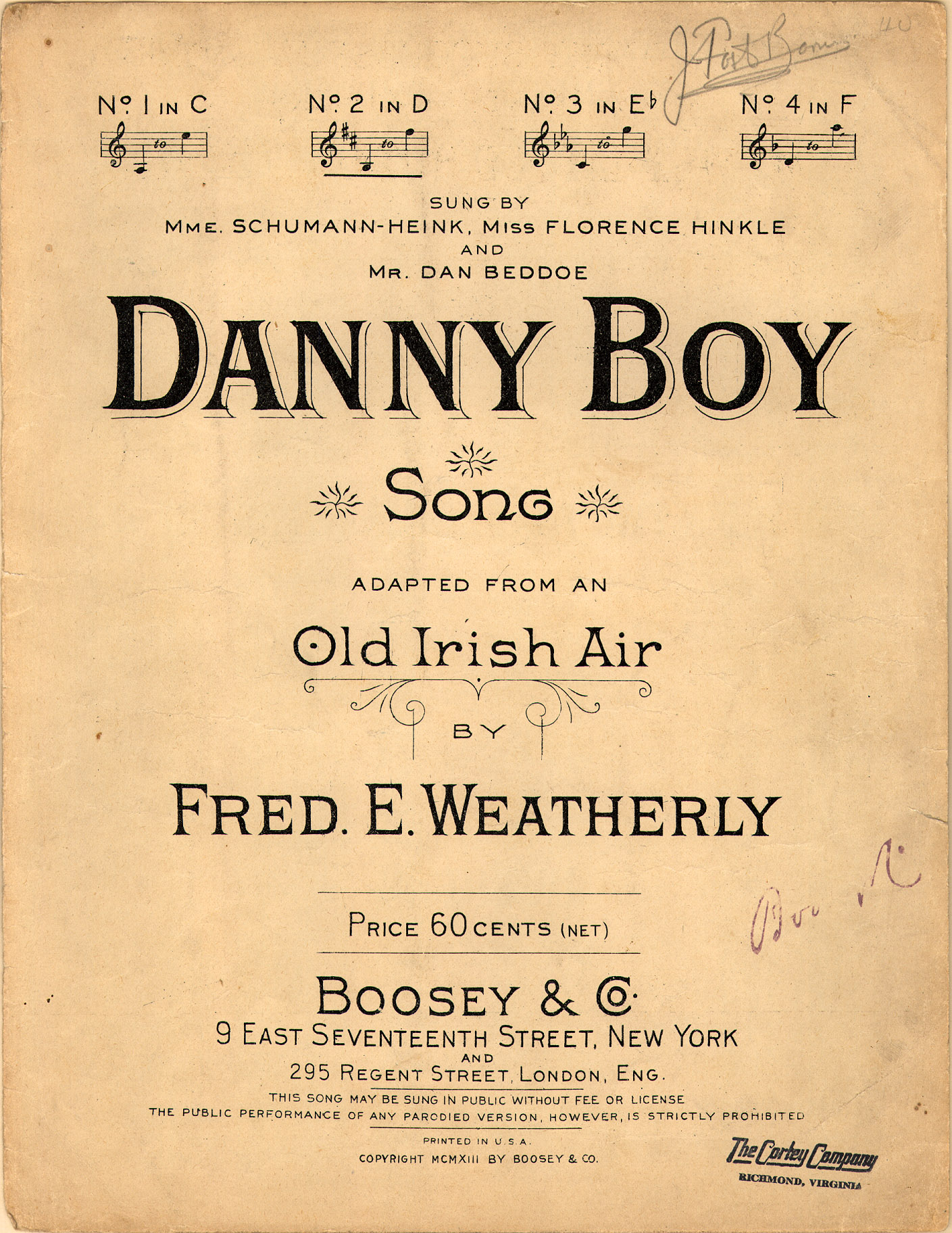
- Danny Boy

Song
- Published: 1913 by Boosey & Company
- Genre: Folk
- Songwriter: Frederic Weatherly (lyrics) in 1910

Recording
- Performed by Celtic Aire of the United States Air Force Band: file; help

"Danny Boy" is a folk song with lyrics written by English lawyer Frederic Weatherly in 1910, and set to the traditional Irish melody of "Londonderry Air" in 1913.

== History ==
"Danny Boy"
Ernestine Schumann-Heink (1917)

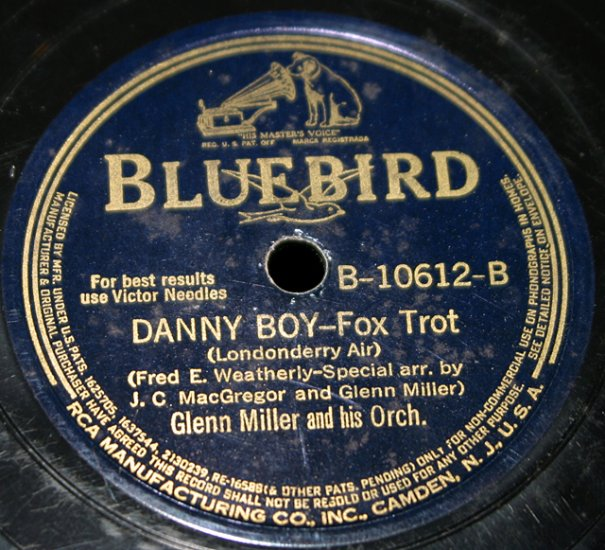
1940 recording by Glenn Miller and His Orchestra on RCA Bluebird, B-10612-B

In 1910, in Bath, Somerset, England, the English lawyer and lyricist Frederic Weatherly initially wrote the words of "Danny Boy" to a tune other than "Londonderry Air". One story is that his sister-in-law Margaret Enright Weatherly (known as "Jess") sent him a copy of "Londonderry Air" in 1913, and Weatherly modified the lyrics of "Danny Boy" to fit its rhyme and meter. A different story has Jess singing the air to Weatherly in 1912 with different lyrics. Yet another story is that Frederic did not set the poem to any tune, but that, in 1913, Jess, who, with her husband Edward Weatherly, was living at the Neosho mine near Ouray, Colorado, in the US, set it to the "Londonderry Air", which she had heard as a child in California played by her father and other Irish railway workers.

Weatherly gave the song to the vocalist Elsie Griffin, who made it one of the most popular songs of the new century. Ernestine Schumann-Heink produced the first recording of "Danny Boy" in 1915.

Jane Ross of Limavady is credited with collecting the melody of "Londonderry Air" in the mid-19th century from a musician she encountered.

== Lyrics ==
The 1913 lyrics by Frederic E. Weatherly:

Oh, Danny boy, the pipes, the pipes are calling
From glen to glen, and down the mountain side.
The summer's gone, and all the roses falling,
It's you, it's you must go and I must bide.
But come ye back when summer's in the meadow,
Or when the valley's hushed and white with snow,
It's I'll be here in sunshine or in shadow,—
Oh, Danny boy, Oh Danny boy, I love you so!

But when ye come, and all the flowers are dying,
If I am dead, as dead I well may be,
Ye'll come and find the place where I am lying,
And kneel and say an Avé there for me.
And I shall hear, though soft you tread above me,
And all my grave will warmer, sweeter be,
For you will bend and tell me that you love me,
And I shall sleep in peace until you come to me!

== Meaning ==
There are various conjectures about the meaning of "Danny Boy". Some interpret the song to be a message from a parent to a son going off to war.

The 1918 version of the sheet music with Weatherly's printed signature included alternative lyrics ("Eily Dear"), with the instructions that "when sung by a man, the words in italic should be used; the song then becomes "Eily Dear", so that "Danny Boy" is only to be sung by a lady". Nonetheless, it is unclear whether this was Weatherly's intent, and it is common practice for exactly the same lyrics to be used when sung by both women and men.

== Usage ==
- Percy Grainger's "Irish Tune from County Derry" adapted the "Danny Boy/Londonderry Air" melody for wind ensemble in 1918.
- The song is popular for funerals, but the National Catholic Reporter wrote in 2001 that it "cannot be played during Mass."
- German poet and playwright Bertolt Brecht wrote an alternative version of the lyrics in 1920 and called it "Reminiscence of Marie A." (Erinnerung an die Marie A.).

== Select recordings ==
"Danny Boy" has been recorded many times by a variety of performers. Several versions are listed below in chronological order.

- 1917 Ernestine Schumann-Heink
- 1928 Colin O'More
- 1940 Judy Garland for the soundtrack of the MGM musical-comedy film Little Nellie Kelly. Garland also sang it live at her concerts in Ireland and Scotland and most famously at her 1951 debut at the Palace Theatre in New York City. The song also features on her 1955 album Miss Show Business (Capitol Records).
- 1940 Glenn Miller and His Orchestra released a single that climbed to No. 17 in "Pop Memories 1890–1954" (not Billboard's charts); Arranged by Glenn Miller and pianist Chummy MacGregor.
- 1941 Bing Crosby Merry Christmas. "Danny Boy" was paired with "I'll Be Home for Christmas" on its original single.
- 1941 Deanna Durbin in the film It Started with Eve
- 1950 Al Hibbler released a single that rose to No. 9 on the US R&B chart.
- 1957 Harry Belafonte sang the song live on the album "An Evening with Harry Belafonte", where he began the song with a spoken recitative, before singing the two verses. He repeated the second half of the first verse the second time around. The recitative goes:
  The Time, a time of strife. The Place, the place is Ireland. And as Irish legend had it, as the last rose of Summer fell, and all the young men of Ireland were to gather to strike a blow For Ireland's Freedom and Ireland's Liberty, There were songs for those who stayed at home, and songs for those who went away, and all of Ireland was sad.
  Belafonte modified the lyrics in significant ways. At the end of the first set of lyrics, he changed "I love you so" to "I'll miss you so" His changes to the second set of lyrics were more substantial: "But if you fall as all the flowers are dying; and you are dead as dead you well may be; I'll come and find the place where you are lying; and kneel and pray and Ave there for thee." He then repeats the second half of the first set of lyrics as noted above, starting with "But come ye back . . ." and this time finishes it with "I love you so." These changes made it more explicitly an anti-war message.
- 1958 Paul Robeson released a version.
- 1959 Conway Twitty's version charted in the US at No. 10 on the Billboard Hot 100, No. 18 on Top R&B. (banned by the BBC)
- 1961 Jim Reeves released a version as the B side to his single The Blizzard . The recording also appears on his 1961 album Tall Tales and Short Tempers.
- 1961 Andy Williams used the song's title for his album Danny Boy and Other Songs I Love to Sing. The single hit #15 on the U.S. adult contemporary and #64 on the Hot 100 charts.
- 1964 John Gary from the album So Tenderly.
- 1964 Patti LaBelle and the Bluebelles released a single that peaked at No. 76 on the Hot 100 in the US.
- 1965 Jackie Wilson's version rose to No. 94 on the Hot 100 and No. 25 on the US R&B charts.
- 1967 Ray Price's single hit No. 60 on the Hot 100 and No. 9 on the Country charts in the US.
- 1970 The Beatles, specifically John Lennon, sings a snippet of "Danny Boy" at the end of their song One After 909 during their famous Rooftop Concert. The recording can be heard on the Let It Be album.
- 1972 Roy Orbison, on his studio album "Memphis".
- 1976 Elvis Presley on his album From Elvis Presley Boulevard, Memphis, Tennessee
- 1990 Frank Patterson performed the song for the soundtrack of the Coen brothers' film Miller's Crossing.
- 1992 Eric Clapton recorded an instrumental version released as a bonus track for Change the World
- 1992 John McDermott released the song as a single.
- 1993 Shining Time Station used the song, performed by Rory Dodd, in the episode "Mr. Conductor's Evil Twin"
- 1993 Sinéad O'Connor sang the song acapella on the Christmas Eve broadcast of The Late Late Show. This rendition had an added half verse which goes "But if I live, and should you die for Ireland. Let not your dying thoughts be just of me. But say a prayer to God for our dear sireland. I know she'll hear and help to set her free."
- 1994 Roger Whittaker, as the title track of a CD Danny Boy and other Irish favorites
- 1997 Riot recorded an instrumental version in their "Inishmore Trilogy" closing the namesake Inishmore album
- 1998 Charlotte Church released the album Voice of an Angel by Sony Classical Records.
- 1998 Sinéad O'Connor sang the song over Davy Spillane's uilleann pipes on Spillane's album The Sea of Dreams. This rendition has the added half verse from the 1993 Christmas acapella as well as a second half to that verse which goes "And I will take your pike and place my dearest. And strike a blow, though weak the blow may be. 'Twill help the cause, to which your heart was nearest. Oh, Danny boy, oh, Danny boy, I love you so." Actor-filmmaker Gabriel Byrne said this version is his favourite.
- 1999 Diana Krall sang the song on The Chieftains' album Tears of Stone
- 1999 Jacintha sang the song on the album Here's To Ben: A Vocal Tribute to Ben Webster
- 2002 Eva Cassidy included her acoustic version on the album Imagine.
- 2002 Johnny Cash recorded the song on his album American IV: The Man Comes Around, working with producer Rick Rubin in what would come to be the last album released during his lifetime. Cash had previously recorded the song for his 1965 album Orange Blossom Special.
- 2007 Hayley Westenra recorded the song as a track for her album entitled Treasure.
- 2011 Girls' Generation recorded the song as a track for their album entitled 2011 Girls' Generation Tour.
- 2017 Emmet Cahill, an Irish tenor, released the song in his solo 2017 album Ireland while part of the band Celtic Thunder.
- Vince Gill and Paul Franklin recorded a version for their 2023 album, Sweet Memories
