= Blue Side of Lonesome (song) =

Single by Jim Reeves

from the album Blue Side of Lonesome
- B-side: "It Hurts So Much (To See You Go)"
- Released: July 1966
- Genre: Country
- Label: RCA
- Songwriter(s): Leon Payne
- Producer(s): Chet Atkins

Jim Reeves singles chronology
"Distant Drums" (1966)	"Blue Side of Lonesome" (1966)	"I Won't Come In While He's There" (1967)

"Blue Side of Lonesome" is a song written and recorded by Leon Payne in 1960.

== Jim Reeves Recording ==
It is most famously known from the posthumous 1966 single by Jim Reeves. Reeves had previously recorded this song on his 1962 album, The Country Side of Jim Reeves. The single was Reeves' fifth posthumous release to reach number one on the U.S. country music chart. "Blue Side of Lonesome" stayed at number one for a single week and spent a total of nineteen weeks on the chart.

=== Chart performance ===
Chart (1966)	Peak position
U.S. Billboard Hot Country Singles	1
U.S. Billboard Hot 100	59
Canadian RPM Top Singles	68
South Africa	6

== Cover Versions ==
- George Jones also released a version on his 1966 album, Love Bug.
