= Billy Bayou =

Song
- Written: 1958
- Songwriter: Roger Miller

"Billy Bayou" is a song written by Roger Miller.

== Song background ==
It's a slightly comic song about a larger-than-life character, having adventures in America in the 1800s.

== Chart performance ==
"Billy Bayou" was released as a 1958 single by Jim Reeves, where the recording spent a total of 25 weeks on the country chart and was his fourth release to reach No. 1, where it stayed for five weeks. It also reached number 9 peak position on Italy's FIMI National Charts in 1958. In Canada, the song reached number 4 on the CHUM Charts. The B-side of "Billy Bayou" titled "I'd Like to Be", peaked at number eighteen on the country chart.

== Cover versions ==
The song has been covered by other artists, including:

- Burl Ives
- Charley Pride
- Doug Kershaw
