= Welcome to My World (Jim Reeves song) =

Single by Jim Reeves

from the album A Touch of Velvet
- B-side: "Good Morning Self" (U.S.), "My Juanita" (UK)
- Released: May 1963 (UK), January 1964 (U.S.)
- Genre: Country
- Label: RCA Victor
- Songwriters: Ray Winkler; John Hathcock

Jim Reeves singles chronology
"Guilty" (1963)	"Welcome to My World" (1963)	"Love Is No Excuse" (1964)

"Welcome to My World" is a popular music standard written by Ray Winkler and John Hathcock and recorded by many artists, most notably Jim Reeves. Eddie McDuff likely contributed to the melody. A traditional love song, the bridge includes lyrics taken from Matthew 7:7–8 ("Knock and the door will open; seek and you will find; ask and you'll be given ... ," from the Sermon on the Mount).

== Jim Reeves version ==
The most famous version was performed by country music singer Jim Reeves, who styled the song in his favoured style of Nashville Sound. Reeves' version was included on his 1962 album A Touch of Velvet and was released as a single in the United States in early 1964, reaching No. 2 on the Billboard Hot Country Singles chart in the spring of that year. It was also occasionally aired on pop radio stations, reaching the No. 2 spot on Billboard's Bubbling Under Hot 100 chart. The song became one of Reeves' last major hits in the U.S. during his lifetime, as he was killed in a plane crash on July 31, 1964.

Reeves' version had been a hit single in the United Kingdom prior to its release as a single in the U.S., peaking at No. 6 in July 1963, and reaching No. 60 on the list of the top 100 best-selling singles of 1963 in the UK.

=== Chart performance ===
Chart (1963–1964)	Peak position
UK Singles Chart	6
U.S. Billboard Hot Country Singles	2
U.S. Billboard Bubbling Under Hot 100	2

== Other notable versions ==
Dean Martin recorded a version of the song that also appears on Martin's album of the same title.

Elvis Presley recorded a version of the song for his TV Special, Aloha from Hawaii via Satellite, and the subsequent live album that resulted from the concert in 1973. It also appeared on Presley's album of the same title.

== Usage in media ==
During the 1990s the John Grenell cover of the song was used in a Toyota television advertising campaign in New Zealand.

The song was used in a 2008 UK advertisement for Thomson's Holidays.

In 2010, the song was used in Mad Men, Season 4 Episode 11, "Chinese Wall".

In 2020, a cover based on the Dean Martin rendition was used in an advertisement for Apple Arcade.

In 2020, Better Call Saul played the song during the opening flash-forward scene of "Magic Man", Season 5 Episode 1. An abridged version was also used in the Season 5 trailer of the series.

In 2022, the song was used in the Prime Video series Night Sky.

Wickes began using a cover of "Welcome to My World" by British singer-songwriter Remi Nicole in advertisements in 2022, continuing in 2023.

The first trailer for 2024's Godzilla × Kong: The New Empire uses an arrangement of the song. It is used in the film's opening scene.
