= The Blizzard (song) =

Single by Jim Reeves

from the album Tall Tales and Short Tempers
- B-side: "Danny Boy"
- Released: February 1961
- Recorded: 1960
- Genre: Country, Western
- Length: 3:24
- Label: RCA Victor
- Songwriter: Harlan Howard
- Producer: Chet Atkins

Jim Reeves singles chronology
"Whispering Hope" (1961)	"The Blizzard" (1961)	"Danny Boy" (1961)

"The Blizzard" is a song written by Harlan Howard and originally recorded for RCA by Jim Reeves. It was released in early 1961 on the album Tall Tales and Short Tempers and also as a single, peaking at number 4 on the Billboard country chart.

== Song story ==
"The Blizzard" is a tragic love story and a man's relationship with a horse, Dan, as the two are caught in a harsh blizzard in the rural countryside. The man's love for a woman named Mary Anne, to whose house he is destined, is also a key part of the story.

When the horse becomes lame because to the harsh winter conditions, the traveler – who tells his story first-person – agrees to walk the remaining seven miles, encouraging Dan along the way. Although he becomes nearly frostbitten as the blizzard becomes more intense during their trek across the open prairie, he is determined to get himself and the horse to Mary Anne's home, where there is a barn with soft hay and, in the house, a supper that includes hot biscuits that he anticipates she is baking.

The journey continues, with updates at seven, five and three miles to Mary Anne's home. Finally, Dan becomes so weak that he needs a rest right now, and collapses in the snow. The traveler admonishes Dan to get up because they know that if they continue to tarry, they'll freeze to death in the snow ... but then realizes he can't leave Dan behind and agrees to rest with him, even though the house and warm barn are just 100 yards – the length of a football field – away.

The next morning, the storm has passed, and a search party has found the traveler and Dan, both dead, both having succumbed to hypothermia. At this point, the narrator changes to a third-person observer who muses that, as the frozen corpses are found (the traveler still had his hands in Dan's reins), had they finished their journey they would still be alive.

== Charts ==
Chart (1961)	Peak position
US Billboard Hot 100	62
US Hot Country Songs (Billboard)	4
US Cashbox Country	2
