= Stand at Your Window =

"Stand at Your Window" is a song written by Jim Carroll and originally recorded for RCA by Jim Reeves. It was released in 1960 on his album According to My Heart and in 1961 as a single (with "What Would You Do?" from the same album on the other side). "What Would You Do?" peaked at number 15 on the Billboard country chart, and "Stand by Your Window" at number 16.

== Charts ==
Chart (1961)	Peak position
US Hot Country Songs (Billboard)	16
US Cashbox Country	9
