= Anna Marie (song) =

Song
- Released: 1957
- Songwriter: Cindy Walker

"Anna Marie" is a song with music and lyrics by Cindy Walker. It was first recorded by Jim Reeves for his album Girls I Have Known (1957, RCA Victor). This recording of the song peaked at No. 3 on Billboard's country and western jockey chart in December 1958. It spent 18 weeks on the charts and was also ranked No. 35 on Billboard's 1958 year-end country and western chart. "Anna Marie" was also recorded by Hank Locklin on his album Foreign Love (1958, RCA Victor), and by Daniel O'Donnell on the album Welcome to My World (2004, Rosette).

== See also ==
- Billboard year-end top 50 country & western singles of 1958
