= Yonder Comes a Sucker =

Single by Jim Reeves

from the album The Country Side of Jim Reeves
- B-side: "I'm Hurtin' Inside"
- Released: July 1955
- Genre: Country
- Length: 2:30
- Label: RCA Victor
- Producer: Chet Atkins

Jim Reeves singles chronology
"Drinking Tequila" (1955)	"Yonder Comes a Sucker" (1955)	"Are You the One" (1955)

"Yonder Comes a Sucker" is a song written and originally recorded for RCA by Jim Reeves. It was released as a single in summer 1955.

== Overview ==
After the success with "Drinking Tequila", which hit No. 9 on country charts, he recorded his next single in 1955, Yonder Comes a Sucker with the B-side "I'm Hurtin'" Inside. The song reached No. 4 on US Country and No. 9 on Cashbox Country. "I'm Hurtin'" was also released as a single and was later included in his Up Through the Years album.

== Other versions ==
Vidar Lønn-Arnesen wrote the Norwegian lyrics. In Norwegian, the song is titled "Livets harde spill" ("The Hard Game of Life").

=== Recordings ===
Vidar Lønn-Arnesen, released the version on the LP Countryfest 6 (Talent TLS 4042) in 1980.

Nystogs, included the song on their album Den femte & på’n igjen (1986)
