= Ray Price discography =

- Studio albums: 51
- Compilation albums: 20
- Singles: 116
- No. 1 Singles: 9

Here is a detailed discography for American country music artist Ray Price.

== Studio albums ==
=== 1950s – 1960s ===
| Title | Details | Peak chart positions | |
| Title | Details | US Country | US |
|---|---|---|---|
| Ray Price Sings Heart Songs | Release date: July 1957; Label: Columbia Records | — | — |
| Talk to Your Heart | Release date: April 1958; Label: Columbia Records | — | — |
| Faith | Release date: September 1960; Label: Columbia Records | — | — |
| Ray Price Sings San Antonio Rose | Release date: May 1962; Label: Columbia Records | — | — |
| Night Life | Release date: April 1963; Label: Columbia Records | 1 | — |
| Love Life | Release date: August 1964; Label: Columbia Records | 3 | — |
| Burning Memories | Release date: March 1965; Label: Columbia Records | 8 | — |
| Western Strings | Release date: 1965; Label: Columbia Records | 18 | — |
| The Other Woman | Release date: September 1965; Label: Columbia Records | 3 | — |
| Another Bridge to Burn | Release date: July 1966; Label: Columbia Records | 1 | — |
| Touch My Heart | Release date: January 1967; Label: Columbia Records | 1 | 129 |
| Danny Boy | Release date: April 1967; Label: Columbia Records | 3 | 106 |
| Take Me as I Am | Release date: March 1968; Label: Columbia Records | 5 | — |
| She Wears My Ring | Release date: December 1968; Label: Columbia Records | 6 | — |
| Sweetheart of the Year | Release date: June 1969; Label: Columbia Records | 37 | — |
| You Wouldn't Know Love | Release date: December 1969; Label: Columbia Records | 12 | — |
"—" denotes releases that did not chart

=== 1970s ===
| Title | Details | Peak chart positions | | | Certifications (sales threshold) |
| Title | Details | US Country | US | CAN | Certifications (sales threshold) |
|---|---|---|---|---|---|
| For the Good Times | Release date: August 1970; Label: Columbia Records | 1 | 28 | 33 | US: Platinum |
| I Won't Mention It Again | Release date: May 1971; Label: Columbia Records | 1 | 49 | 46 | |
| The Lonesomest Lonesome | Release date: June 1972; Label: Columbia Records | 3 | 145 | — | |
| She's Got to Be a Saint | Release date: March 1973; Label: Columbia Records | 4 | 161 | — | |
| You're the Best Thing That Ever Happened to Me | Release date: 1974; Label: Columbia Records | 24 | — | — | |
| This Time, Lord | Release date: November 1974; Label: Myrrh Records | — | — | — | |
| Like Old Times Again | Release date: 1975; Label: Myrrh Records | 7 | — | — | |
| If You Ever Change Your Mind | Release date: June 1975; Label: Columbia Records | 33 | — | — | |
| Say I Do | Release date: December 1975; Label: ABC / Dot Records | 29 | — | — | |
| Rainbows and Tears | Release date: June 1976; Label: ABC / Dot Records | 45 | — | — | |
| Hank'n Me | Release date: September 1976; Label: ABC / Dot Records | 42 | — | — | |
| Reunited | Release date: April 1977; Label: ABC / Dot Records | 47 | — | — | |
| Precious Memories | Release date: 1977; Label: Word Records | — | — | — | |
| How Great Thou Art | Release date: 1978; Label: Word Records | — | — | — | |
| There's Always Me | Release date: March 1979; Label: Monument Records | — | — | — | |
"—" denotes releases that did not chart

=== 1980s ===
| Title | Details | Peak chart positions |
| Title | Details | US Country |
|---|---|---|
| Town and Country | Release date: September 1981; Label: Dimension Records/RCA Records | 17 |
| Somewhere in Texas | Release date: December 1982; Label: Dimension Records/RCA Records | — |
| Master of the Art | Release date: May 31, 1983; Label: Warner Bros. Records | 48 |
| Welcome to Ray Price Country | Release date: 1985; Label: Step One Records | — |
| Portrait of a Singer | Release date: December 1985; Label: Step One Records | 56 |
| A Revival of Old Time Singing | Release date: September 1986; Label: Step One Records | — |
| The Heart of Country Music | Release date: December 1986; Label: Step One Records | — |
| Just Enough Love | Release date: March 1988; Label: Step One Records | 64 |
"—" denotes releases that did not chart

=== 1990s – 2010s ===
| Title | Details | Peak chart positions | | Sales |
| Title | Details | US Country | US | Sales |
|---|---|---|---|---|
| Step One Records' Hall of Fame Series | Release date: October 15, 1991; Label: Step One Records | — | — | |
| Sometimes a Rose | Release date: March 20, 1992; Label: Columbia Records | — | — | |
| The Old Rugged Cross | Release date: November 16, 1993; Label: Arrival Records | — | — | |
| Prisoner of Love | Release date: May 16, 2000; Label: Justice Records | — | — | |
| Time | Release date: August 27, 2002; Label: Audium Entertainment | — | — | |
| Beauty Is... The Final Sessions | Release date: April 15, 2014; Label: AmeriMonte Records | 22 | 143 | US: 35,500 |
"—" denotes releases that did not chart

== Christmas albums ==
| Title | Details |
|---|---|
| The Ray Price Christmas Album | Release date: November 1969; Label: Columbia Records |
| A Christmas Gift for You | Release date: November 1987; Label: Step One Records |

== Collaborations ==
| Title | Details | Peak chart positions | | | Certifications (sales threshold) |
| Title | Details | US Country | US | CAN Country | Certifications (sales threshold) |
|---|---|---|---|---|---|
| San Antonio Rose (with Willie Nelson) | Release date: May 1980; Label: Columbia Records | 3 | 70 | 1 | US: Gold |
| Memories That Last (with Faron Young) | Release date: October 10, 1991; Label: Step One Records | — | — | — | |
| Run That by Me One More Time (with Willie Nelson) | Release date: July 1, 2003; Label: Lost Highway Records | 62 | — | — | |
| Last of the Breed (with Merle Haggard and Willie Nelson) | Release date: March 20, 2007; Label: Lost Highway Records | 7 | 64 | — | |
"—" denotes releases that did not chart

== Compilation albums ==
| Title | Details | Peak chart positions | | Certifications (sales threshold) |
| Title | Details | US Country | US | Certifications (sales threshold) |
|---|---|---|---|---|
| Ray Price's Greatest Hits | Release date: March 1961; Label: Columbia Records | — | — | |
| The Same Old Me | Release date: 1966; Label: Columbia Record Club | — | — | |
| Ray Price's Greatest Hits, Vol. 2 | Release date: July 1967; Label: Columbia Records | 17 | — | |
| The World of Ray Price | Release date: June 1970; Label: Columbia Records | 18 | — | |
| Make the World Go Away | Release date: November 1970; Label: Harmony Records | — | — | |
| Welcome to My World | Release date: October 1971; Label: Columbia Records | 21 | 146 | |
| Ray Price's All-Time Greatest Hits | Release date: June 1972; Label: Columbia Records | 7 | 165 | US: Gold |
| The Best of Ray Price | Release date: May 1976; Label: Columbia Records | 25 | — | |
| Help Me | Release date: May 13, 1977; Label: Columbia Records | — | — | |
| A Tribute to Willie and Kris | Release date: February 13, 1981; Label: Columbia Records | 59 | — | |
| The Honky-Tonk Years (1951-1957) | Release date: December 26, 1985; Label: Rounder Records | — | — | |
| Greatest Hits, Vol. 1 | Release date: June 1986; Label: Step One Records | — | — | |
| Greatest Hits, Vol. 2 | Release date: June 1986; Label: Step One Records | — | — | |
| Greatest Hits, Vol. 3 | Release date: June 1986; Label: Step One Records | — | — | |
| American Originals | Release date: June 13, 1989; Label: Columbia Records | — | — | |
| By Request – Greatest Hits, Vol. 4 | Release date: July 15, 1989; Label: Step One Records | — | — | |
| The Essential Ray Price 1951-1962 | Release date: October 29, 1991; Label: Columbia Records | — | — | |
| Super Hits | Release date: August 12, 1997; Label: Columbia Records | — | — | |
| 16 Biggest Hits | Release date: August 10, 1999; Label: Legacy Recordings | — | — | |
| The Essential Ray Price | Release date: May 29, 2007; Label: Legacy Recordings | — | — | |
"—" denotes releases that did not chart

== Singles ==
=== 1950s ===
| Year | Single | Peak chart positions | | Album |
| Year | Single | US Country | US | Album |
|---|---|---|---|---|
| 1952 | "Talk to Your Heart" | 3 | — | —N/a |
| 1952 | "Don't Let the Stars Get in Your Eyes" | 4 | — | The World of Ray Price |
| 1954 | "I'll Be There (If You Ever Want Me)" | 2 | — | —N/a |
| 1954 | "I'm Much too Young to Die" | 13 | — | —N/a |
| 1956 | "Run Boy" | 5 | — | —N/a |
| 1956 | "Crazy Arms" | 1 | 27 | Ray Price's Greatest Hits |
| 1956 | "I've Got a New Heartache" | 2 | — | Ray Price's Greatest Hits |
| 1957 | "I'll Be There (When You Get Lonely)" | 12 | — | Ray Price's Greatest Hits |
| 1957 | "My Shoes Keep Walking Back to You" | 1 | 63 | Ray Price's Greatest Hits |
| 1958 | "Curtain in the Window" | 3 | — | The Same Old Me |
| 1958 | "City Lights" | 1 | 71 | Ray Price's Greatest Hits |
| 1958 | "That's What It's Like to Be Lonesome" | 7 | — | —N/a |
| 1959 | "Heartaches by the Number" | 2 | — | Ray Price's Greatest Hits |
| 1959 | "The Same Old Me" | 1 | — | Ray Price's Greatest Hits |
"—" denotes releases that did not chart.

=== 1960s ===
| Year | Single | Peak chart positions | | | Album |
| Year | Single | US Country | US | CAN Country | Album |
|---|---|---|---|---|---|
| 1960 | "One More Time" | 5 | — | — | Ray Price's Greatest Hits |
| 1960 | "I Wish I Could Fall in Love Today" | 5 | — | — | —N/a |
| 1961 | "Heart Over Mind" | 5 | — | — | —N/a |
| 1961 | "The Twenty-Fourth Hour" | 13 | — | — | Night Life |
| 1961 | "Soft Rain" | 3 | 115 | — | The Same Old Me |
| 1962 | "I've Just Destroyed the World (I'm Living in)" | 12 | — | — | The Same Old Me |
| 1962 | "Pride" | 5 | — | — | Night Life |
| 1962 | "Walk Me to the Door" | 7 | — | — | Burning Memories |
| 1963 | "Make the World Go Away" | 2 | 100 | — | Burning Memories |
| 1963 | "Night Life" | 28 | — | — | Night Life |
| 1964 | "Burning Memories" | 2 | — | — | Burning Memories |
| 1964 | "Please Talk to My Heart" | 7 | — | 1 | Love Life |
| 1964 | "A Thing Called Sadness" | 38 | — | — | Burning Memories |
| 1965 | "The Other Woman" | 2 | — | — | The Other Woman |
| 1965 | "Don't You Ever Get Tired (Of Hurting Me)" | 11 | — | — | The Other Woman |
| 1966 | "A Way to Survive" | 7 | — | — | Touch My Heart |
| 1966 | "Touch My Heart" | 3 | — | — | Touch My Heart |
| 1967 | "Danny Boy" | 9 | 60 | — | Danny Boy |
| 1967 | "Crazy" | 73 | — | — | Danny Boy |
| 1967 | "I'm Still Not Over You" | 6 | — | 16 | Take Me as I Am |
| 1967 | "Take Me as I Am (Or Let Me Go)" | 8 | — | 3 | Take Me as I Am |
| 1968 | "I've Been There Before" | 11 | — | 35 | She Wears My Ring |
| 1968 | "She Wears My Ring" | 6 | — | 7 | She Wears My Ring |
| 1968 | "Set Me Free" | 51 | — | — | She Wears My Ring |
| 1969 | "Sweetheart of the Year" | 11 | — | 8 | Sweetheart of the Year |
| 1969 | "Raining in My Heart" | 14 | — | — | You Wouldn't Know Love |
| 1969 | "April's Fool" | 14 | — | — | You Wouldn't Know Love |
"—" denotes releases that did not chart

=== 1970s ===
| Year | Single | Peak chart positions | | | | | | Album |
| Year | Single | US Country | US | US AC | CAN Country | CAN | CAN AC | Album |
|---|---|---|---|---|---|---|---|---|
| 1970 | "You Wouldn't Know Love" | 8 | — | — | 15 | — | — | You Wouldn't Know Love |
| 1970 | "For the Good Times" | 1 | 11 | 10 | 2 | 13 | 10 | For the Good Times |
| 1971 | "I Won't Mention It Again" | 1 | 42 | 4 | 1 | — | — | I Won't Mention it Again |
| 1971 | "I'd Rather Be Sorry" | 2 | 70 | — | 2 | 74 | 27 | I Won't Mention it Again |
| 1972 | "The Lonesomest Lonesome" | 2 | 109 | — | 2 | — | — | The Lonesomest Lonesome |
| 1972 | "She's Got to Be a Saint" | 1 | 93 | — | 2 | — | — | She's Got to Be a Saint |
| 1973 | "You're the Best Thing That Ever Happened to Me" | 1 | 82 | — | 2 | — | 37 | You're the Best Thing That Ever Happened to Me |
| 1974 | "Storms of Troubled Times" | 25 | — | — | — | — | — | You're the Best Thing That Ever Happened to Me |
| 1974 | "Like a First Time Thing" | 15 | — | — | — | — | — | You're the Best Thing That Ever Happened to Me |
| 1974 | "Like Old Times Again" | 4 | — | — | 5 | — | — | Like Old Times Again |
| 1975 | "Roses and Love Songs" | 3 | — | — | 2 | — | — | Like Old Times Again |
| 1975 | "The Farthest Thing from My Mind" | 17 | — | — | 46 | — | — | Like Old Times Again |
| 1975 | "If You Ever Change Your Mind" | 31 | — | — | 45 | — | — | If You Ever Change Your Mind |
| 1975 | "Say I Do" | 40 | — | — | 34 | — | — | Say I Do |
| 1976 | "That's All She Wrote" | 34 | — | — | — | — | — | Rainbows and Tears |
| 1976 | "To Make a Long Story Short" | 41 | — | — | — | — | — | Rainbows and Tears |
| 1976 | "A Mansion on the Hill" | 14 | — | — | 16 | — | — | Hank 'n Me |
| 1977 | "Help Me" | 38 | — | — | — | — | — | Help Me |
| 1977 | "Different Kind of Flower" | 28 | — | — | — | — | — | Reunited |
| 1977 | "Born to Love Me" | 21 | — | — | 36 | — | — | —N/a |
| 1978 | "Feet" | 19 | — | — | 22 | — | — | There's Always Me |
| 1979 | "There's Always Me" | 30 | — | — | 34 | — | — | There's Always Me |
| 1979 | "That's the Only Way to Say Good Mornin'" | 18 | — | — | 44 | — | — | There's Always Me |
| 1979 | "Misty Morning Rain" | 43 | — | — | 50 | — | — | There's Always Me |
"—" denotes releases that did not chart

=== 1980s – 1990s ===
| Year | Single | Peak chart positions | | Album |
| Year | Single | US Country | CAN Country | Album |
|---|---|---|---|---|
| 1981 | "Getting Over You Again" | 28 | — | Town and Country |
| 1981 | "It Don't Hurt Me Half as Bad" | 6 | — | Town and Country |
| 1981 | "Diamonds in the Stars" | 9 | 22 | Town and Country |
| 1982 | "Forty and Fadin'" | 18 | 7 | Town and Country |
| 1982 | "Wait Till Those Bridges Are Gone" | 62 | — | Somewhere in Texas |
| 1982 | "Somewhere Down in Texas" | 55 | — | Somewhere in Texas |
| 1983 | "Willie Write Me a Song" | 72 | 42 | Master of the Art |
| 1983 | "Scotch and Soda" | 70 | — | Master of the Art |
| 1983 | "Coors in Colorado" | — | — | Master of the Art |
| 1985 | "(She's Got a Hold of Me Where It Hurts) She Won't Let Go" | 77 | 53 | Welcome to Ray Price Country |
| 1985 | "I'm Not Leaving (I'm Just Getting Out of the Way)" | 81 | — | Welcome to Ray Price Country |
| 1985 | "Five Fingers" | 67 | — | Welcome to Ray Price Country |
| 1986 | "You're Nobody till Somebody Loves You" | 60 | — | Portrait of a Singer |
| 1986 | "All the Way" | 73 | — | Portrait of a Singer |
| 1986 | "Please Don't Talk About Me When I'm Gone" | 86 | — | Portrait of a Singer |
| 1986 | "When You Gave Your Love to Me" | 55 | — | Just Enough Love |
| 1987 | "Just Enough Love" | 52 | — | Just Enough Love |
| 1988 | "Big Ole Teardrops" | 68 | — | Just Enough Love |
| 1988 | "Don't the Morning Always Come too Soon" | 55 | — | Just Enough Love |
| 1988 | "I'd Do It All Over Again" | 83 | — | Just Enough Love |
| 1989 | "Love Me Down to Size" | 79 | — | Step One Records' Hall of Fame Series |
| 1992 | "A Way to Free Myself" | — | — | Sometimes a Rose |
"—" denotes releases that did not chart

== Other singles ==
=== Collaborations ===
| Year | Single | Artist | Peak chart positions | | Album |
| Year | Single | Artist | US Country | CAN Country | Album |
|---|---|---|---|---|---|
| 1954 | "If You Don't Somebody Else Will" | The Cherokee Cowboys | 8 | — | —N/a |
| 1980 | "Faded Love" | Willie Nelson | 3 | 3 | San Antonio Rose |
| 1980 | "Don't You Ever Get Tired (Of Hurting Me)" | Willie Nelson | 11 | 8 | San Antonio Rose |
| 1983 | "One Fiddle, Two Fiddle" | Johnny Gimble and the Texas Swing Band | 70 | — | Honkytonk Man (soundtrack) |
| 1984 | "A New Place to Begin" | The Cherokee Cowboys | 87 | — | —N/a |
| 1984 | "Better Class of Loser" | The Cherokee Cowboys | 73 | — | —N/a |
| 1984 | "What Am I Gonna Do Without You" | The Cherokee Cowboys | 77 | — | —N/a |
| 1992 | "A Whole Lot of You" | Faron Young | — | — | Memories That Last |
| 1992 | "She's in Paris" | Faron Young | — | — | Step One Records' Hall of Fame Series |
"—" denotes releases that did not chart

=== Guest singles ===
| Year | Single | Artist | Peak chart positions | | Album |
| Year | Single | Artist | US Country | CAN Country | Album |
|---|---|---|---|---|---|
| 1959 | "One Way to Give and Take" | Billy Walker | — | — | —N/a |
| 1982 | "Old Friends" | Roger Miller and Willie Nelson | 19 | 18 | Old Friends |
"—" denotes releases that did not chart

=== Christmas singles ===
| Year | Single | Album |
|---|---|---|
| 1969 | "Jingle Bells" | The Ray Price Christmas Album |
| 1987 | "For Christmas" | Christmas Gift for You |

== Charted B-sides ==
| Year | Single | Peak chart positions | | Original A-side |
| Year | Single | US Country | US | Original A-side |
|---|---|---|---|---|
| 1954 | "Release Me" | 6 | — | "I'll Be There (If You Ever Want Me)" |
| 1956 | "You Done Me Wrong" | 7 | — | "Crazy Arms" |
| 1956 | "Wasted Words" | 4 | — | "I've Got a New Heartache" |
| 1958 | "It's All Your Fault" | flip | — | "Curtain in the Window" |
| 1958 | "Invitation to the Blues" | 3 | 92 | "City Lights" |
| 1959 | "Under Your Spell Again" | 5 | — | "Same Old Me" |
| 1960 | "I Can't Run Away from Myself" | 23 | — | "Wish I Could Fall in Love Today" |
| 1961 | "The Twenty-Fourth Hour" | 13 | — | "Heart Over Mind" |
| 1961 | "Here We Are Again" | 26 | — | "Soft Rain" |
| 1962 | "Big Shoes" | 22 | — | "I've Just Destroyed the World (I'm Living in)" |
| 1962 | "You Took Her Off My Hands (Now Please Take Her Off My Mind)" | 11 | — | "Walk Me to the Door" |
| 1963 | "Night Life" | 28 | — | "Make the World Go Away" |
| 1964 | "That's All That Matters" | 34 | — | "Burning Memories" |
| 1966 | "I'm Not Crazy Yet" | 28 | — | "A Way to Survive" |
| 1970 | "Grazin' in Greener Pastures" | flip | — | "For the Good Times" |
| 1972 | "That's What Leaving's About" | 66 | — | "The Lonesomest Lonesome" |
| 1976 | "We're Getting There" | 47 | — | "To Make a Long Story Short" |
| 1983 | "San Antonio Rose" (with Johnny Gimble and the Texas Swing Band) | flip | — | "One Fiddle, Two Fiddle" |
"—" denotes releases that did not chart
