= List of Top Country LP's number ones of 1971 =

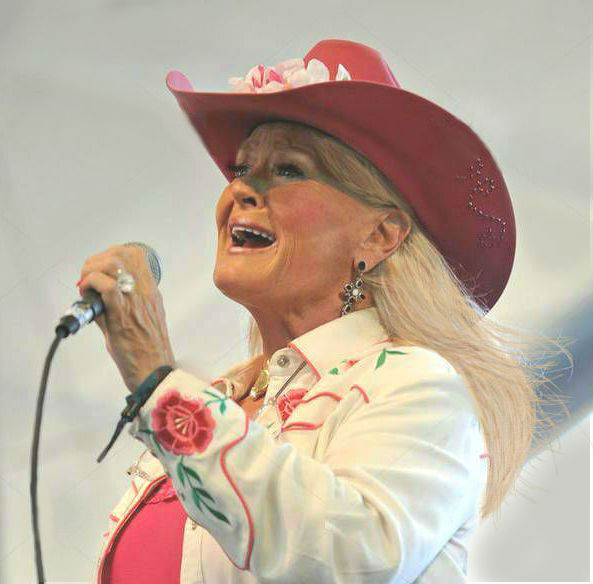
Lynn Anderson had a long-running number one with Rose Garden.

Top Country Albums is a chart that ranks the top-performing country music albums in the United States, published by Billboard. In 1971, 10 different albums topped the chart, which was at the time published under the title Top Country LP's, based on sales reports submitted by a representative sample of stores nationwide.

In the issue of Billboard dated January 2, Ray Price reached number one with his album, For the Good Times, displacing the final chart-topper of 1970, The Johnny Cash Show by Johnny Cash. Price's album held the top spot for six weeks before losing it to Rose Garden by Lynn Anderson, which remained at number one for 12 consecutive weeks, the year's longest unbroken run atop the chart. It also marked a record for the longest uninterrupted run at number one on the country albums chart by a female vocalist which would stand until 1989, when Reba McEntire topped the listing for thirteen consecutive weeks with Sweet Sixteen. The album would have two further single-week runs in the top spot for a final total of 14 weeks at number one. Anderson would return to the top of the chart in August with You're My Man, which spent seven weeks at number one, and her total of 21 weeks in the top spot in 1971 was the most by any artist. Although she remained a regular on the country charts for the remainder of the decade and into the 1980s, she did not achieve any further chart-topping albums.

In addition to Anderson, Ray Price and Charley Pride each achieved two number ones during the year. Price's I Won't Mention It Again received the award for Album of the Year from the Country Music Association but would prove to be the final number one for the singer, who had achieved much of his success prior to Billboard first publishing a country albums chart in 1964, although he would remain active in the music industry into his 80s. The final chart-topping album of 1971 was Easy Loving by Freddie Hart, which spent the last nine weeks of the year atop the chart. It was the first chart-topping album for Hart, who had signed his first recording contract in 1953 and entered the country singles chart for the first time in 1959, but had achieved no significant success until the song "Easy Loving" went to number one in September 1971. He achieved a run of consistent success until 1975, when his chart placings fell away once again.

== Chart history ==
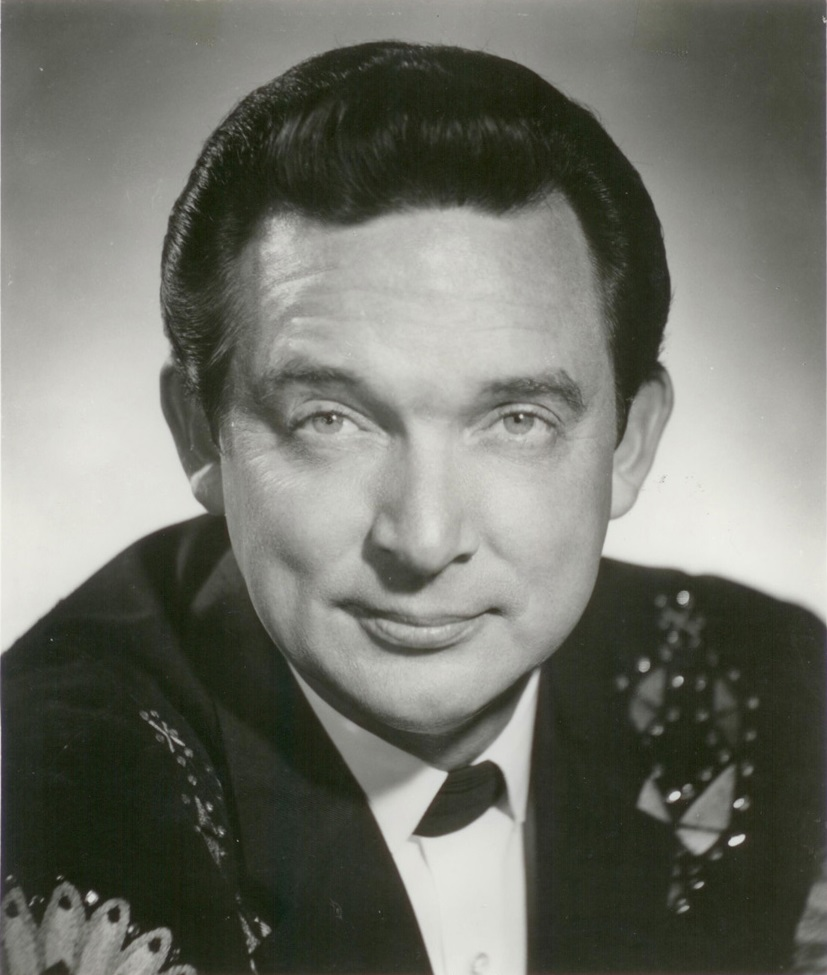
Ray Price had two chart-topping albums in 1971.

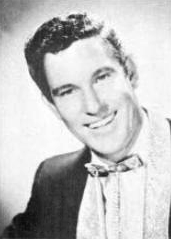
Easy Loving by Freddie Hart was the year's final number one.

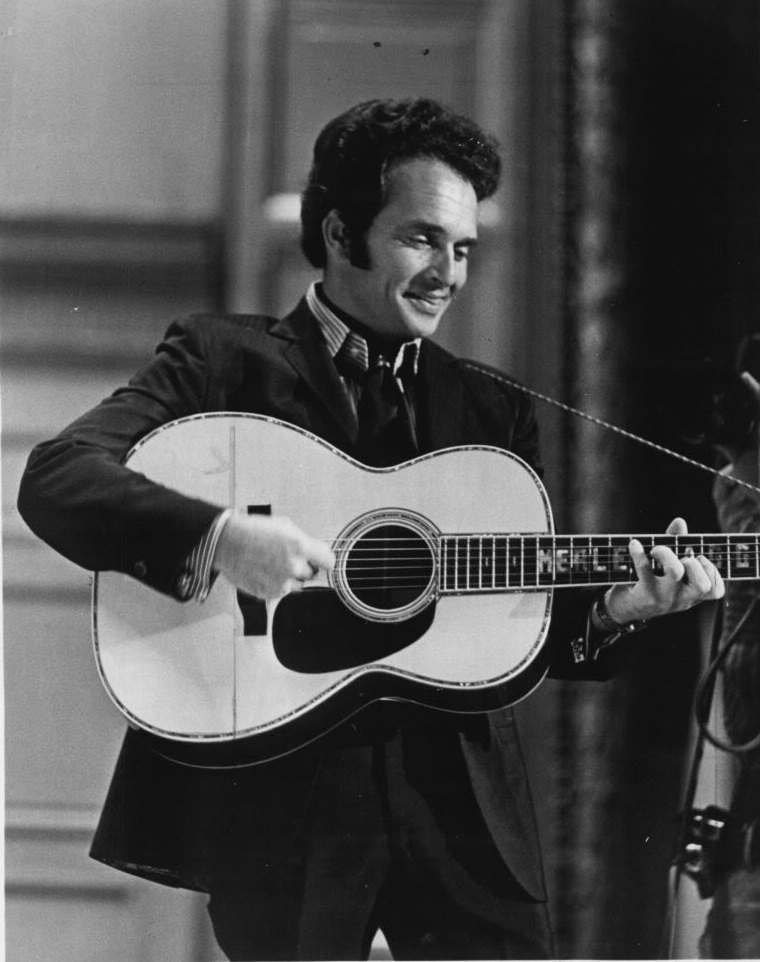
Merle Haggard and his backing band The Strangers topped the chart with the album Hag.

Issue date	Title	Artist(s)	Ref.
January 2	For the Good Times	Ray Price	
January 9	For the Good Times	Ray Price	
January 16	For the Good Times	Ray Price	
January 23	For the Good Times	Ray Price	
January 30	For the Good Times	Ray Price	
February 6	For the Good Times	Ray Price	
February 13	Rose Garden	Lynn Anderson	
February 20	Rose Garden	Lynn Anderson	
February 27	Rose Garden	Lynn Anderson	
March 6	Rose Garden	Lynn Anderson	
March 13	Rose Garden	Lynn Anderson	
March 20	Rose Garden	Lynn Anderson	
March 27	Rose Garden	Lynn Anderson	
April 3	Rose Garden	Lynn Anderson	
April 10	Rose Garden	Lynn Anderson	
April 17	Rose Garden	Lynn Anderson	
April 24	Rose Garden	Lynn Anderson	
May 1	Rose Garden	Lynn Anderson	
May 8	Help Me Make It Through the Night	Sammi Smith	
May 15	Rose Garden	Lynn Anderson	
May 22	Hag	Merle Haggard and the Strangers	
May 29	Hag	Merle Haggard and the Strangers	
June 5	Rose Garden	Lynn Anderson	
June 12	Hag	Merle Haggard and the Strangers	
June 19	Hag	Merle Haggard and the Strangers	
June 26	Did You Think to Pray	Charley Pride	
July 3	I Won't Mention It Again	Ray Price	
July 10	I Won't Mention It Again	Ray Price	
July 17	I Won't Mention It Again	Ray Price	
July 24	Man in Black	Johnny Cash	
July 31	Man in Black	Johnny Cash	
August 7	I Won't Mention It Again	Ray Price	
August 14	I'm Just Me	Charley Pride	
August 21	I'm Just Me	Charley Pride	
August 28	You're My Man	Lynn Anderson	
September 4	You're My Man	Lynn Anderson	
September 11	You're My Man	Lynn Anderson	
September 18	You're My Man	Lynn Anderson	
September 25	You're My Man	Lynn Anderson	
October 2	You're My Man	Lynn Anderson	
October 9	You're My Man	Lynn Anderson	
October 16	I'm Just Me	Charley Pride	
October 23	I Won't Mention It Again	Ray Price	
October 30	Easy Loving	Freddie Hart	
November 6	Easy Loving	Freddie Hart	
November 13	Easy Loving	Freddie Hart	
November 20	Easy Loving	Freddie Hart	
November 27	Easy Loving	Freddie Hart	
December 4	Easy Loving	Freddie Hart	
December 11	Easy Loving	Freddie Hart	
December 18	Easy Loving	Freddie Hart	
December 25	Easy Loving	Freddie Hart	
