= Big D Jamboree =

American variety radio program

Big D Jamboree was a radio program broadcast by KRLD-AM in Dallas, Texas. The show consisted of appearances by famous country musicians, and sketch comedy and jokes. It was also carried by KRLD-TV during the 1950s.

== History ==
Big D Jamboree began in 1947 as The Lone Star Barn Dance, but was renamed October 16, 1948. It was held in the Dallas Sportatorium. The show was initially produced by Al Turner and Ed McLemore, and then later by Johnny Hicks and Johnny Harper. The number of musicians who performed regularly rose from 20 to 50 by 1953. Around 1956, the CBS Radio Network began carrying the Big D Jamboree nationally. A number of later country stars appeared on the program, including Jimmy Lee Fautheree, Jim Reeves, Webb Pierce, Hank Locklin, Gene O'Quin and Billy Walker (who wore a mask and was billed as the Traveling Texan).

For many musicians, Big D Jamboree was a jumping point to larger shows, such as Louisiana Hayride or The Grand Ole Opry. KRLD-TV also broadcast a live Saturday-afternoon preview of the night's show in 1956, and by 1957, it was telecast live from the stage each Saturday night from 10–10:30 pm CT.

Since it was the only country music program in the Dallas area, it enjoyed years of great popularity toward the end of the 1950s, but lost listenership in the 1960s, eventually leading to its cancellation.

== Performers ==
(in alphabetical order)

- Charline Arthur
- Billy Jack Hale
- Benny Belew
- Bobby Belew
- Doug Bragg
- Dick Burnet
- Paul Buskirk
- Homer Callahan
- Ronnie Callahan
- Walter Callahan
- Bert Carrol
- Johnny Carroll
- Johnny Cash
- Patsy Cline
- Orville Couch
- Riley Crabtree
- Bobby Crown
- "Joe Bill" D'Angelo
- Ronnie Dawson
- "Specs" Dickson
- Werly Fairburn
- Jimmy Lee Fautheree
- Charlie Feathers
- Dianne Foster
- Gus Foster
- Doreen Freeman
- Lefty Frizzell
- Artie Glenn
- Darrell Glenn
- Cousin Herald Goodman
- Rex Griffin
- Dewey Groom
- Helen Hall
- Johnny Harper
- Johnny Hicks
- The Hilltop Ramblers
- Wanda Jackson
- Sonny James
- Jimmy & Johnny
- Okie Jones
- George Kent
- Merle Kilgore
- Sid King and the Five Strings
- Patti Lane
- Betty Lou Lobb
- Hank Locklin
- Janis Martin and the Marteens
- Johnny "Country" Mathis
- Chuck Mayfield
- Eddie McDuff
- Marvin "Smokey" Montgomery
- Johnny Moore
- Willie Nelson
- Gene O'Quin
- LeFawn Paul
- Leon Payne and his Lone Star Buddies
- Peach Seed
- Carl Perkins
- Charlie "Sugartime" Phillips
- Webb Pierce
- Joe Poovey
- Trenda Korkmas
- Elvis Presley
- Joe Price
- Ray Price
- Donn Reynolds
- Wilford Roach
- Bobby Roy
- Billy Jack Saucier
- Shelton Brothers (early Big D Jamboree stars)
- Warren Smith
- Hank Snow
- Sunshine Ruby
- The Texas Stompers
- Hank Thompson
- Mitchell Torok
- Al Turner
- Gene Vincent
- Jimmy Wakely
- Billy Walker
- Bobby Williamson
- Slim Whitman
- Slim Willet
- Jim Reeves
- The York Brothers
- Dale Snow & The Snowmen
- Tommy Horton
- Bob Luman
