= Love Life (Ray Price album) =

Studio album by Ray Price
- Released: 1964
- Genre: Country
- Label: Columbia
- Producer: Don Law, Frank Jones

Ray Price chronology
Night Life (1963)	Love Life (1964)	Burning Memories (1965)

Love Life is a studio album by country music artist Ray Price. It was released in 1964 by Columbia Records (catalog no. CS-8989).

The album debuted on Billboard magazine's country album chart on September 5, 1964, peaked at No. 3, and remained on the chart for a total of 34 weeks. The album included two hit singles: "Take Me as I Am (Or Let Me Go)" (No. 8) and "Please Talk to My Heart" (No. 7).

AllMusic gave the album four stars.

== Track listing ==
Side A

1. "This Cold War With You" (Floyd Tillman) - 2:57
2. "Take Me As I Am (Or Let Me Go)" (Boudleaux Bryant) - 1:56
3. "All Right (I'll Sign The Papers)" (Mel Tillis) - 2:28
4. "I Fall to Pieces" (Hank Cochran, Harlan Howard) - 2:48
5. "I Don't Know Why (I Keep Loving You)" (Fred Carter Jr.) - 2:59
6. "How Long Is Forever" (Willie Nelson) - 2:32

Side B

1. "Please Talk to My Heart" ("Country" Johnny Mathis, Jimmy Lee Fautheree) - 2:58
2. "A Way to Free Myself" (Joe Hayes) - 2:09
3. "You're Stronger Than Me" (Hank Cochran, Jimmy Key) - 2:22
4. "Same Old Memories" (Tompall Glaser) - 2:27
5. "Still" (Bill Anderson) - 2:42
6. "Cold, Cold Heart" (Hank Williams) - 3:42
