= 1967 Country Music Association Awards =

Annual US music awards ceremony

- Date: October 20, 1967
- Location: Nashville Municipal Auditorium, Nashville, Tennessee
- Hosted by: Sonny James; Bobbie Gentry
- Most wins: Jack Greene (3)
- Most nominations: Merle Haggard (4)

The 1967 Country Music Association Awards, 1st Ceremony, was held on October 20, 1967, at the Nashville Municipal Auditorium, Nashville, Tennessee, and was hosted by Sonny James and Bobbie Gentry.

== Winners and nominees ==
Winners in Bold.

| Entertainer of the Year | Album of the Year |
|---|---|
| **Eddy Arnold**; Bill Anderson; Merle Haggard; Sonny James; Buck Owens | **There Goes My Everything — Jack Greene**; Best of Eddy Arnold — Eddy Arnold; Best of Sonny James — Sonny James; Danny Boy — Ray Price; I'm a Lonesome Fugitive — Merle Haggard |
| Male Vocalist of the Year | Female Vocalist of the Year |
| **Jack Greene**; Eddy Arnold; Merle Haggard; Sonny James; Buck Owens | **Loretta Lynn**; Lynn Anderson; Connie Smith; Dottie West; Tammy Wynette |
| Vocal Group of the Year | Comedian of the Year |
| **The Stoneman Family**; The Anita Kerr Singers; The Browns; Johnny Cash and June Carter; Statler Brothers; Tammy Wynette and David Houston | **Don Bowman**; Archie Campbell; Ben Colder; Homer & Jethro; Minnie Pearl |
| Single of the Year | Song of the Year |
| **"There Goes My Everything" — Jack Greene**; "Danny Boy" — Ray Price; "It's Such a Pretty World Today" — Wynn Stewart; "Ode to Billie Joe" — Bobbie Gentry; "The Fugitive" — Merle Haggard | **"There Goes My Everything" — Dallas Frazier**; "All the Time" — Mel Tillis, Wayne Walker; "It's Such a Pretty World Today" — Dale Noe; "My Elusive Dreams" — Curly Putman, Billy Sherrill; "Ode to Billie Joe" — Bobbie Gentry |
| Instrumental Group of the Year | Instrumentalist of the Year |
| **The Buckaroos**; Cherokee Cowboys; Texas Troubadours; The Masters Three; Wagon Masters | **Chet Atkins**; Roy Clark; Floyd Cramer; Pete Drake; Boots Randolph |

== Hall of Fame ==
Country Music Hall of Fame Inductees
- Red Foley
- Joseph Frank
- Jim Reeves
- Stephen H. Sholes
