= List of personalities who appeared on Ozark Jubilee =

This is a list of personalities or groups who appeared from 1955–1960 on ABC-TV's Ozark Jubilee, renamed Country Music Jubilee and later Jubilee USA. A year(s) is included where documented, but some performers may have made other appearances. This list includes cast members and guests. An asterisk (*) indicates appearances on "Junior Jubilee."

- Roy Acuff and the Smoky Mountain Boys (1958, 60)
- Eddy Akridge, singing rodeo rider (1956)
- Lennie Aleshire (1955–60)
- All American Quartet (1955)
- Red Allen (1959)
- Rex Allen (1955–58, 60)
- Fran Allison (1955–57, 60)
- Bill Anderson (1959–60)
- Annie Lou and Danny (1955–57)
- The Arden Sisters (1956)
- Suzi Arden (1955–59)
- Eddy Arnold (1955–1960)
- Charline Arthur (1955)
- Chet Atkins (1957–58)
- Gene Autry (1956, 60)
- The Ballentines, harmonica players (1956)
- Molly Bee (1960)
- Carl Belew (1959)
- Jimmy Belken, fiddle (1955–60)
- Boyd Bennett (1957–58)
- Roger Berger
- Mo. Lt. Gov. Jim Blair (1956)
- The Bob Bohm Trio (1960)
- Johnny Bond (1955–56)
- Pat Boone (1955–59)
- Chuck Bowers (1955–58)
- Margie Bowes
- The Braga Sisters (1959)
- Uncle Cyp and Aunt Sap Brasfield (1955–60)
- Rod Brasfield (1957)
- Mike Breid (1955–56)*
- Mrs. Robert E. Broach, 1956 Polio Mother of the Year (1956)
- Cecil Brower (1955–60)
- Billy Brown (1960)
- Jim Brown (1955, 57)
- Jim Ed and Maxine Brown (1955–56)
- The Browns (1956–57)
- Slim Bryant and his Wildcats (1959)
- The Bullfrogs (Tadpoles' parents) (1955)
- Dave Bunker (1958)
- Bill Burke, accordion (1955)
- Smiley Burnette (1955, 57–60)
- Shirley Caddell (1955–57)
- Ginger Callahan, banjo (1955)
- Barbara Cameron (1957)
- Archie Campbell (1959)
- Anita Carter (1957)
- June Carter (1958)
- The Carter Sisters (1956)*
- Bill Carlisle (1956)
- The Carlisles (1956, 59)
- Thumbs Carllile (1956–58)
- Colleen Carroll
- Little Johnny Edwards (1955, 56
- Joe Carson (1957)
- Martha Carson (1958, 60)
- Johnny Cash (1956, 58–60)
- Curly Chalker (1955–60)
- Pat Charles (1960)
- The Chelette Sisters (1956)
- Don Cherry (1960)
- Buddy Childers (1960)
- Lew Childre (1955, 57, 59)
- Christ Episcopal Church children's choir, Springfield (1960)
- Sanford Clark (1957)
- Tenn. Gov. Frank Clement (1956)
- Patsy Cline (1956–60)
- The Collins Kids (1955, 1960)
- Tommy Collins (1955)
- The Commodores Quartet (1955)
- The Compton Brothers (1956)*
- Johnny Cook (1956)
- Wilma Lee and Stoney Cooper (1959)
- Cowboy Copas (1960)
- Ray Crespin, Seventeen fashion editor (1956)
- Kay Crowe (1959)
- Johnny Dakota (1955)
- "Ragtime" Bob Darch (1960)
- Jimmie Davis and the Plainsmen (1956–57, 59)
- Rufe Davis (1956, 60)
- The Davis Sisters (1955)
- Skeeter Davis (1956, 59)
- Eddie Dean (1955)
- Jimmy Dean (1956)
- Dee and Patty (1958)
- Arnie Derksen (1959)
- Curly Detwyler's Hicks and Chicks, square dancers (1955)
- Little Jimmy Dickens (1957)
- Dottie Dillard
- Rusty Draper (1956, 60)
- Jimmy Driftwood (1959, 60)
- Roy Drusky (1960)
- Arlie Duff (1954–55)
- Doug Dugger
- The Duke of Paducah (1955, 57)
- Tommy Duncan (1956)
- "Little Johnny" Edwards (1955)
- Gary Ellison, caller (1956–60)
- Patsy Elshire (1955)
- Emory University roller-skating square dancers (1956, 59)
- James "Rusty" Estes (1955–60)
- Billy Eustis (1960)
- Rita Faye (1955)
- Terry Fell (1955)
- Buster Fellows, fiddle (1955–60)
- Shug Fisher (1955–57, 60)
- The Five Phils (1956)
- Linda Flanagan (1956)
- The Foggy River Boys (1955–60)
- Betty Foley (1959)
- Jenny Lou Foley (1959)
- Red Foley, host (1955–60)
- Howdy Forrester
- Buford Foster, caller (1955–60)
- Ralph Foster (1960)
- The Four Bees (1959)
- The Four Jacks (1959)
- Wally Fowler (1956)
- Curly Fox (1959)
- Tillman Franks (1955, 59)
- Dallas Frazier (1955)
- Frisco Joe, banjo (1956)
- Lefty Frizzell (1955)
- The Frontiersmen (1960)
- Johnny Gailey (1955–60)
- Alfred W. "Red" Gale (1956–57)
- Wanda Gann (1957)
- Hank Garland (1955–60)
- Red Garrett (1956)
- Jimmy Gately (1956–57, 1959)
- The Gays (1960)
- Don Gibson (1959–60)
- Terry Gilkyson and The Easy Riders (1958)
- Johnny Gimble
- Glen Glenn (1956)
- Lonnie Glosson (1957)
- Terry Gott (1956, 59)*
- Don Graham (1957)
- Billy Grammer (1960)
- Hope Griffith (1957)
- Betty Ann Grove (1956–57, 59)
- Bobby Grove (1956)
- Charlie Haden (1955–57)
- Roy Hall (1956)
- The Hames Sisters (1958)
- George Hamilton IV (1959)
- June Hamra
- The Hardin Trio (1956)*
- The Harmonettes (1959, 1960)
- Bill Hart, ventriloquist (1956)
- The Harmoniers Quartet (1958, 1959)
- Hawkshaw Hawkins (1956)
- Speedy Haworth (1955–60)
- Bobby Helms (1957, 59)
- U.S. Sen. Tom Hennings (1956)
- Jenny Herrell (1959)
- Goldie Hill (1955, 57)
- Charlie Hodge (1955–57)
- Sharon Kay Hodgson (1956)
- Salty Holmes (1955, 59)
- Homer and Jethro (1957–58)
- Libby Horne (1955–58)*
- Johnny Horton (1956–57, 60)
- David Houston (1957)
- Jan Howard (1960)
- Shirlee Hunter (1957–58)
- Ferlin Husky (1958, 60)
- The Imperial Quartet (1955)
- Bud Isaacs (1956)
- Stonewall Jackson
- Tommy Jackson (1955)
- Wanda Jackson (1955–58)
- Sonny James (1955–58)
- Norma Jean (1955–58, 60)
- Jig-A-Longs square dancers
- Jimmie John (1960)
- Jimmy & Johnny (1956)
- Cousin Jody, comic guitarist (1959)
- Johnnie & Jack (1958, 59)
- Betty Johnson (1955–56, 59)
- George Jones (1959)
- Grandpa Jones (1958)
- Little Montie Jones (1955)
- The Jordanaires (1958)
- The Jubilaires (1960)
- Judy Kay (1958–60)
- L. D. Keller, caller (1955–1960)
- The Kern Sisters (1960)
- The Anita Kerr Singers (1960)
- Nelson King, disc jockey (1956)
- Pee Wee King (1957–58, 60)
- Sid King and the Five Strings (1955)
- Jack Kingston (1958)
- Twinkle Knessley (1956)*
- The La Dell Sisters (1956)
- The Lamppost Four (1959)
- Bobby Lanera (1956)*
- Roy Lanham
- Snooky Lanson (1960)
- Brenda Lee (1955–60)*
- Rosalie Leis, beauty queen (1956)
- Lincicome, Anita, Becky and Cathy (ABC Triplets) 1958
- Merl Lindsay (1957)
- Hank Locklin (1955–56, 58)
- Little Eller Long (1957–58)
- Lonzo and Oscar (1959–60)
- Bobby Lord (1955–60)
- The Louvin Brothers (1958)
- Jim Lowe (1955, 57)
- Lulu Belle and Scotty (1956)
- Ray Lunsford (1955)
- Mary Lunell (1957)
- Judy Lynn (1956)
- Leon McAuliffe and His Cimarron Boys (1955, 58, 60)
- Kathleen McClung (1956)*
- The McCormick Brothers (1955)
- The McCoys (1958)
- Skeets McDonald
- Eva Kay "Cookie" McKinney (1957–58)*
- Bill McMains, Conn staff organist (1957)
- Warner Mack (1957, 59)
- The Maddox Brothers and Rose (1955)
- Johnny Manson, fiddle
- Bryan "Doc" Martin (1955–60)
- Grady Martin (1955–60)
- Hank Martin (1960)
- Janis Martin (1957)
- Sonny Martin (1956)*
- Wink Martindale (1959)
- Alma May, 1956 Cotton Bag Sewing Queen (1956)
- Will Mercer (1958)
- The Miller Brothers Band (1957–58)
- Frankie Miller (1959)
- Johnny Miller, one-man band (1957–58)
- Mike Miller, banjo (1957)
- The Missouri Ramblers (1955), square dancers
- Paul Mitchell (1955–60)
- The Mobleys (1956)*
- Patsy Montana (1957)
- Melba Montgomery (1960)
- Bob Moore (1955–60)
- George Morgan (1957–59)
- Billy Joe Morris (1956–57)*
- Harold Morrison (1955–60)
- "Hairless Joe" Morrison, banjo (1955)
- Stan Musial (1956)
- Bobby Myers (1956)*
- Marlene Olsen, 1957 March of Dimes poster child
- Jimmy C. Newman (1955–56, 59)
- Penny Nichols (1954–55)
- Peggy Norris (1957)
- Mattie O'Neal (1955)
- The Oklahoma Wranglers (1955)
- Bashful Brother Oswald
- Buck Owens (1960)
- Dusty Owens (1956, 60)
- The Ozark Playboys (1955)
- The Ozark Sashayers
- Betty Patterson (1960)
- Pat Patterson (1955, 59)
- Minnie Pearl (1957–58, 60)
- Carl Perkins and Perkins Brothers Band (1956–57)
- The Philharmonics (1955–60)
- Webb Pierce (1955–58)
- Pete Pike (1955)
- The Four Pitchikers (1959–60)
- Polly Possum (1957)
- Ray Price (1957, 59)
- The Promenaders (1955–60)
- Sammy Pruitt (1960)
- Ted Rains
- Marvin Rainwater (1955–60)
- Rascals in Rhythm (1957)
- Shirley Raye
- Jim Reeves (1955, 58–59)
- Duncan Renaldo (1957)
- Don Reno (1955)
- Jack Reno (1955)
- George Rhodes (1960)
- Jimmie Riddle
- Bill Ring (1955–60)
- Tex Ritter (1955–57, 60)
- The Little Roberts Sisters (1958)
- Marty Robbins (1958)
- Rita Robbins (1956)
- Jinnie Rodgers
- Smokey Rogers (1958)
- Mimi Roman (1956)
- Carla Rowe (1959)
- Dido Rowley (1955)
- Harmonica Bill Russell (1956)
- Floyd "Goo Goo" Rutledge (1955–60)
- Jimmie Selph (1955)
- Joe Settlemires, Ozark Jubilee Band (1957)
- "Billy" Dale Sexton (1956)*
- Jean Shepard (1955–58)
- Merv Shiner (1959)
- U.S. Rep. Dewey Short (1955)
- Lu Ann Simms (1957)
- Margie Singleton (1959–60)
- Jimmie Skinner (1955, 58)
- Merv Shiner (1959)
- Joe Slattery (1955–60)
- Bonnie Sloan (1955)
- Arthur Smith (1956)
- Carl Smith (1959–60)
- Smokey Bear (1956)
- The Solomons, 1956 March of Dimes poster family (1956)
- Tommy Sosebee (1955–57)
- Red Sovine (1955, 57)
- Clyde Wayne Spears (1956)*
- Sammy Spencer
- The Spider & The Fly, comedy duo (1956)*
- Pete Stamper (1955–57)
- Jed Starkey (1955, 59)
- Rocky Starr (1959)
- Jon and Sandra Steele (1956)
- "Texas" Bill Strength (1955–57)
- Stringbean (1958, 60)
- Redd Stewart (1955, 59–60)
- Wynn Stewart (1960)
- The Sunshine Boys (1955)
- U.S. Sen. Stuart Symington (1956)
- Jim Symington (1958)
- The (Lake of the Ozark) Tadpoles (1956–60)
- Tom Tall (1955)
- Dub Taylor (1956–57)
- Vonnie Taylor (1955–56)
- Zed Tennis (1955–60)
- Gordon Terry (1960)
- Tex Terry (1958)
- Jeannie Thomas (1960)
- Hank Thompson and the Brazos Valley Boys (1957, 60)
- Tommy Thompson, guitarist (1959)
- Casey Tibbs (1955)
- Mel Tillis
- Floyd Tillman (1958–59)
- Mitchell Torok (1956)
- Merle Travis (1955, 59–60)
- The Trumpeteers (1955)
- Ernest Tubb (1957–58)
- Justin Tubb (1955)
- Barney Tucker (1956)
- Wesley and Marilyn Tuttle, father-daughter (1956)
- Conway Twitty (1958)
- T. Texas Tyler (1957)
- June Valli (1960)
- Leroy Van Dyke (1955–60)
- The Vernon Family (1959)
- Gene Vincent and His Blue Caps (1957)
- The Wagon Wheelers (1956–60)
- Porter Wagoner (1955–58)
- Jimmy Wakely (1956–58, 60)
- Billy Walker (1955–59)
- Cindy Walker (1958–59)
- Don Warden (1955–57)
- Luke Warmwater (1955)
- The Weaver Brothers
- June Webb (1960)
- Ardis Wells and Her Rhythm Ranch Girls (1957)
- Kitty Wells (1958)
- Speedy West (1955–58)
- Tabby West (1955–56, 58)
- Ern Westmore (1955)
- The Westport Kids (1955)
- Onie Wheeler (1956)
- Slim Whitman (1955)
- The Whirli-jiggers (1956–57)*
- Bob White (1955–60)
- The Wilburn Brothers (1956, 58, 60)
- John "Bucky" Wilkin (1956, 58)*
- Audrey Williams (1956–57)
- Tex Williams (1957–58)
- Bob Wills and His Texas Playboys (1957, 59)
- Brad Wilson (1956)*
- Earl Wilson (1956)
- Jim Wilson (1955–57)
- Slim Wilson (1955–60)
- Bill Wimberly and His Country Rhythm Boys (1955–60)
- Mac Wiseman (1955–1956)
- Joe Wolverton] (1957)
- Del Wood (1957)
- Marion Worth
- Darlene Wright (1959)
- Wymer, Ernie (1959)
- The York Brothers (1955)
- The Yost Sisters
- Faron Young (1958, 60)
