= She's Got to Be a Saint =

She's Got to Be a Saint may refer to:

- "She's Got to Be a Saint" (song), a 1972 song by Ray Price
- She's Got to Be a Saint (album), a 1973 album by Ray Price
