= I Speak to the Stars =

Single by Doris Day
- B-side: "The Blue Bells of Broadway (Are Ringing Tonight)"
- Released: March 8, 1954
- Genre: Vocal
- Length: 3:06
- Label: Columbia; 40210
- Songwriter(s): Paul Francis Webster, Sammy Fain

Doris Day singles chronology
"Lost in Loveliness" (February 1, 1954)	"I Speak to the Stars" (1954)	"Someone Else's Roses" (May 17, 1954)

"I Speak to the Stars" is a song written by Paul Francis Webster and Sammy Fain and performed by Doris Day. In 1954, the track reached No. 16 on the U.S. chart.

== Other versions ==
- Tommy Dorsey and His Orchestra featuring Jimmy Dorsey released a version of the song as the B-side of his 1954 single "Wanted".
- Van Howard released a version of the song as the B-side of his 1954 single "I'm Not a Kid Anymore".
- Margaret Whiting released a version of the song as the B-side of her 1954 single "It’s Nice to Have You Home".
