= The Need to Be =

Single by Jim Weatherly

from the album The Songs of Jim Weatherly
- B-side: "Like Old Times Again"
- Released: September 1974
- Genre: Country
- Length: 3:53
- Label: Buddah Records
- Songwriter(s): Jim Weatherly
- Producer(s): Jimmy Bowen

Jim Weatherly singles chronology
"Loving You Is Just an Old Habit" (1973)	"The Need to Be" (1974)	"I'll Still Love You" (1975)

"The Need to Be" is a song written by American singer-songwriter Jim Weatherly. First recorded for Weatherly's 1974 album The Songs of Jim Weatherly, the single release peaked at No. 6 on the Billboard Adult Contemporary chart, No. 11 on the Billboard Hot 100, also reaching the top 20 on the corresponding Canadian charts.

== Chart performance ==
Chart (1974)	Peak position
Canada RPM Top Singles	13
Canada RPM Adult Contemporary	17
US Billboard Hot 100	11
US Adult Contemporary (Billboard)	6

== Cover versions ==
Artists who have recorded cover versions of the song include:

- Gladys Knight & the Pips (on their 1974 album I Feel a Song)
- Ray Price (on his 1974 album You're The Best Thing That Ever Happened to Me)
- Vikki Carr (on her 1974 album One Hell of a Woman)
- The Harold Wheeler Consort (on their 1975 album Black Cream)
- Esther Satterfield (on her 1976 album The Need to Be)
- Julie Anthony (on her 1977 album A Part of Me)
- Sandra Feva (on her 1979 album The Need to Be)
- Dardanelle (on her 1982 album The Colors of My Life)
- Gayle Marie (on her 1982 album Night Rainbow)
- Diana Lee (on her 1993 release Movin' Out Back)
- Daniel Bernard Roumain and Ryuichi Sakamoto (on the 2008 DJ Spooky album Sound Unbound)
