= You're the Best Thing That Ever Happened to Me (disambiguation) =

"You're the Best Thing That Ever Happened to Me" is a 1973 song by Ray Price.

You're the Best Thing That Ever Happened to Me may also refer to:

- You're the Best Thing That Ever Happened to Me (Dean Martin album), 1973
- You're the Best Thing That Ever Happened to Me (Ray Price album), 1974
