= San Antonio Rose (album) =

Studio album by Willie Nelson and Ray Price
- Released: May 1980
- Genre: Country
- Length: 36:52
- Label: Columbia
- Producer: Willie Nelson

Willie Nelson albums chronology
The Electric Horseman (1980)	San Antonio Rose (1980)	Honeysuckle Rose (1980)

Ray Price albums chronology
There's Always Me (1979)	San Antonio Rose (1980)	A Tribute to Willie and Kris (1981)

Professional ratings
Review scores
Source	Rating
AllMusic	4/5 stars

San Antonio Rose is a studio album by American country music artists Willie Nelson and Ray Price. It was released in 1980 via Columbia Records. The album peaked at number 3 on the Billboard Top Country Albums chart.

Price had recorded an album by the same title in 1961 as a tribute to Bob Wills, on which Nelson played acoustic guitar.

== Track listing ==
1. "San Antonio Rose" (Bob Wills) – 3:42
2. "I'll Be There (If You Ever Want Me)" (Rusty Gabbard, Ray Price) – 2:41
3. "I Fall to Pieces" (Hank Cochran, Harlan Howard) – 3:16
4. "Crazy Arms" (Ralph Mooney, Chuck Seals) – 2:41
5. "Release Me" (Eddie Miller, Dub Williams, Robert Yount) – 3:06
6. "Don't You Ever Get Tired (Of Hurting Me)" (Hank Cochran) – 3:39
7. "This Cold War with You" (Floyd Tillman) – 3:19
8. "Funny How Time Slips Away" (Willie Nelson) – 3:50
9. "Night Life" (Walt Breeland, Paul Buskirk, Willie Nelson) – 4:03
10. "Deep Water" (Fred Rose) – 2:45
11. "Faded Love" (Bob Wills, Johnnie Lee Wills) – 3:50
  - Crystal Gayle, backing vocals

2003 CD reissue bonus tracks

12. "Just Call Me Lonesome" (Rex Griffin) – 3:21
13. "My Life's Been a Pleasure" (Jesse Ashlock) – 2:07

== Chart performance ==
Chart (1980)	Peak position
U.S. Billboard Top Country Albums	3
U.S. Billboard 200	70
Canadian RPM Country Albums	1

== Certifications ==
Region	Certification	Certified units/sales
United States (RIAA)	Gold	500,000^{^}
^{^} Shipments figures based on certification alone.
