= Charline Arthur =

American singer

- Also known as: Charlene Arthur
- Born: Charline Highsmith; September 2, 1929
- Origin: Texas, United States
- Died: November 27, 1987 (aged 58)
- Genres: Boogie-woogie; blues; rockabilly
- Occupation: Singer

Charline Arthur (also Charlene Arthur, née Charline Highsmith; September 2, 1929 – November 27, 1987) was an American singer of boogie-woogie, blues, and early rockabilly. In 1950, Arthur began work as a singer and a disc jockey at the Texas radio station KERB. She left three years later after the impresario Colonel Tom Parker discovered her, signing her with RCA Records. She was a regular performer on the Big D Jamboree radio program throughout the 1950s and 1960s. Arthur also performed and toured with Elvis Presley and others, but in 1956 RCA dropped her from the label and her career declined. Described as a "flash in the pan" and a "woman before her time", Arthur was inducted into the Rockabilly Hall of Fame and has, since the 1980s, found favor with critics who praise her vocal style, her stage presence, and her influence on artists such as Elvis Presley and Patsy Cline.

== Early life ==
Charline Highsmith was born in 1929 to a Pentecostal minister and his wife from Henrietta, Texas and was the second of twelve children. The family was poor but musically inclined, and music was a central part of her family life. Her ambition was to play guitar; she collected bottles and cashed them in to raise the money for her first guitar. An early influence was the Texas boogie-woogie artist Ernest Tubb. By the age of 15, Charline was performing on KPLT radio station in Paris, Texas. She joined a traveling medicine show after winning the show's talent contest. Charline married Jack Arthur, the show's bass player, in 1948. He later performed on some of her records and managed her during the early part of her career.

After Charline left the medicine show, she played in bars and clubs. She cut her first record in Dallas, in 1950, "I've Got the Boogie Blues/Love is a Gamble" (Bullet Records), a song she had written at age twelve. She moved to Kermit, in West Texas, where she worked for a while as a DJ and singer, stirring up some controversy. Colonel Tom Parker was one of those who took notice of her. Parker got Charline into a recording studio in Nashville in 1952, where she signed with RCA Victor.

== Career ==
=== 1952–1957 ===
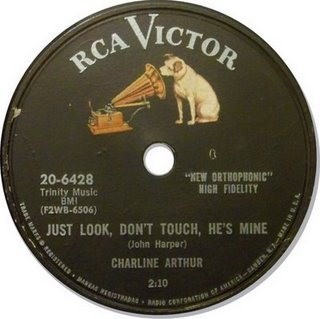
Just Look, Don't Touch, He's Mine

Arthur toured in 1954 with the RCA country and Western caravan, with Hank Snow, by Greyhound tour bus. Artists on the tour included Chet Atkins, Minnie Pearl, Hawkshaw Hawkins, the New Davis sisters and Betty Cody, with Eddie Hill as the tour "Master of Ceremonies". They played Charlotte, North Carolina, Mobile, Alabama, Oklahoma City, Oklahoma, and Tulsa, Oklahoma. At the Little Rock, Arkansas show, RCA sent a recording engineer who taped the show and later issued on EP record RCA EPB 3220, entitled "Country and Western Caravan 1954".

The height of her career was in 1955. That year she recorded for RCA, under Steve Sholes and Chet Atkins. In a national poll she was voted the nation's second best country artist (after Kitty Wells). She continued to tour and played with Elvis Presley a number of times in Texas throughout 1955, including on the Big D Jamboree show when Elvis made his first appearance there on 16 April.

In 1956, however, she parted ways with Chet Atkins; reportedly she was difficult to work with. Also, her record sales were relatively low and success on the charts eluded her. RCA canceled her contract and she was not successful in getting another record deal. Arthur felt that the conflict with Atkins was caused because he wanted her to record more assertive songs than she wanted to perform. Analysis of her works has shown that her most mainstream songs were her own compositions, but her lyrics were sexually suggestive and censored by both the Grand Ole Opry and Country and Western Jamboree, a popular fan magazine.

=== 1957–1987 ===
After RCA dropped her, she divorced her husband. In 1957 she recorded a few songs for the Coin label in Los Angeles. In the late 1950s she played and sang wherever she could and for a while had a trio with her sisters Bettie Sue Farlow and Dorothy Dean Etheridge, but success eluded them. Afterward, she moved to Salt Lake City and then, with the help of an old fan, she got a regular gig in Idaho where she played until the mid 1960s. In her later career, Arthur recognized that her image, one which did not reflect femininity or domestic problems women encountered, was causing a disconnect with her fans and she became more subdued, altering her image to be more conventional.

In the late 1970s she performed for Ernest Tubb's Midnight Jamboree show, and she retired in 1978, living near her sister in Pocatello, Idaho on a disability check. She died there on November 27, 1987, aged 58, due to natural causes.

== Legacy ==
An important reissue of Arthur songs was Welcome to the Club, containing singles recorded between 1949 and 1957, on the German label Bear Family Records. This 1986 album (whose appearance greatly pleased Arthur, then living with her sister in Idaho and suffering from arthritis) came out on CD in 1998 but remains, as All Music Guide to Country laments, the only record of hers available. While Welcome to the Club attracted little attention, interest in Arthur was renewed in the early 1990s when the role of women in country music was becoming more important. Two historians, Mary A. Bufwack and Robert K. Oermann, noted that Arthur "fought for the right to become country's first truly aggressive, independent female of the postwar era. Ultimately she lost".

Since then, various appreciations of Arthur's style and music have been published. The book Texas Music (2000) calls her a "criminally overlooked artist" and praises her for her voice and her influence on Patsy Cline, Wanda Jackson, and even Elvis. The Encyclopedia of Country Music (2012) hails her "gutsy, blues-flavored vocal style and brassy stage presence", and states that her importance is far, far greater than "her commercial fortunes might suggest". Charline is often cited as a pioneering rockabilly female.

== Discography ==
=== Compilation albums ===
- Burn That Candle – Charline Arthur (Bear Family) (1986)
- Calling All Rock ’N’ Roll Collectors, Vol. 3b. (Cat)
- Ultra Rare Hillbilly Boogie, Vol. 1c. (Chief)
- Hillbilly Houn’ Dawgs & Honky Tonk Angels (Detour)
- The Big D Jamboree Live (Dragon Street)
- Gals Of The Big D Jamboree (Dragon Street)

== See also ==
- List of personalities who appeared on Ozark Jubilee
