= Like Old Times Again =

Studio album by Ray Price
- Released: 1974
- Genre: Country
- Label: Myrrh

Ray Price chronology
You're the Best Thing That Ever Happened to Me (1974)	Like Old Times Again (1974)	If You Ever Change Your Mind (1975)

Like Old Times Again is a 1974 studio album by country music artist Ray Price. It was his first album after parting ways with Columbia Records; the album was released by Myrrh Records (catalog no. MST-6538).

The album debuted on Billboard magazine's country album chart on November 23, 1974, peaked at No. 7, and remained on the chart for a total of 23 weeks. It included three Top 20 singles: "Roses and Love Songs" (No. 3); "Like Old Times Again" (No. 4); and "Farthest Thing From My Mind" (No. 17).

AllMusic gave the album two-and-a-half stars. All songs on the album were written by Jim Weatherly.

== Track listing ==
Side A

1. "Roses and Love Songs"
2. "The Closest Thing to Love"
3. ""Like Old Times Again"
4. "My First Day Without Her"
5. "Where Do I Put Her Memory"

Side B

1. "Love Finds Its Own Way"
2. "Living Every Man's Dream"
3. "Farthest Thing From My Mind"
4. "All That Keeps Me Going"
5. "The Goings Up and the Comings Down"
