= The Other Woman (Ray Price album) =

Studio album by Ray Price
- Released: 1965
- Genre: Country
- Label: Columbia
- Producer: Don Law, Frank Jones

Ray Price chronology
Western Strings (1965)	The Other Woman (1965)	Another Bridge to Burn (1966)

The Other Woman is a studio album by country music artist Ray Price. It was released in 1965 by Columbia Records (catalog no. CS-9182).

The album debuted on Billboard magazine's country album chart on October 2, 1965, peaked at No. 3, and remained on the chart for a total of 38 weeks. The album included two Top 20 singles: "The Other Woman" (No. 2) and "Don't You Ever Get Tired of Hurting Me" (No. 11).

AllMusic gave the album four-and-a-half stars.

== Track listing ==
Side A

1. "The Other Woman (In My Life)" (Don Rollins) - 2:55
2. "Don't You Ever Get Tired of Hurting Me" (Hank Cochran) - 2:42
3. "After Effects (From Loving You)" (Hank Mills) - 2:27
4. "Too Much Love Is Spoiling You" (Fred Carter Jr.) - 2:44
5. "An Eye For an Eye" (Johnny Bush) - 3:10
6. "Unloved, Unwanted" (Irene Stanton, Wayne P. Walker) - 3:16

Side B

1. "Funny How Time Slips Away" (Willie Nelson) - 3:39
2. "Born to Lose" (Frankie Brown) - 3:27
3. "Just Call Me Lonesome" (Rex Griffin) - 2:25
4. "This Cold War With You" (Floyd Tillman) - 2:56
5. "Rose-Colored Glasses" (Fred Carter Jr.) - 2:15
6. "The Last Letter" (Rex Griffin) - 3:13
