= Another Bridge to Burn =

Studio album by Ray Price
- Released: July 1966
- Genre: Country
- Label: Columbia
- Producer: Don Law, Frank Jones

Ray Price chronology
The Other Woman (1965)	Another Bridge to Burn (1966)	Touch My Heart (1966)

Another Bridge to Burn is a studio album by country music artist Ray Price. It was released in 1966 by Columbia Records (catalog no. CS-9328). The cover photograph was taken by Don Hunstein.

The album debuted on Billboard magazine's country album chart on July 10, 1966, peaked at No. 1, and remained on the chart for a total of 24 weeks.

AllMusic gave the album three stars.

== Track listing ==
Side A

1. "Healing Hands of Time" (Willie Nelson) - 2:24
2. "Another Bridge to Burn" (Harlan Howard) - 2:51
3. "Take These Chains From My Heart" (Fred Rose, Hy Heath) - 2:25
4. "Don't You Believe Her" (Nat Stuckey) - 2:36
5. "I Want to Hear It From You" (Fred Carter Jr.) - 2:20
6. Don't Touch Me" (Hank Cochran) - 3:22

Side B

1. "(I'd Be) a Legend in My Time" (Don Gibson) - 2:30
2. "I'd Fight the World" (Hank Cochran, Joe Allison) - 2:48
3. "Go Away" (Willie Nelson) - 2:10
4. "Too Late" (Jimmy Wakely) - 3:09
5. "It Should Be Easier Now" (Willie Nelson) - 2:58
