= Touch My Heart =

Studio album by Ray Price
- Released: 1967
- Genre: Country
- Label: Columbia
- Producer: Don Law, Frank Jones

Ray Price chronology
Another Bridge to Burn (1966)	Touch My Heart (1967)	Danny Boy (1967)

Touch My Heart is a studio album by country music artist Ray Price. It was released in 1967 by Columbia Records (catalog no. CL-2606).

The album debuted on Billboard magazine's country album chart on January 28, 1967, peaked at No. 1, and remained on the chart for a total of 35 weeks. The album included two singles that became Top 10 hits: "Touch My Heart" (No. 3) and "A Way to Survive" (No. 7).

AllMusic gave the album four-and-a-half stars.

== Track listing ==
Side A

1. "Touch My Heart" [3:06]
2. "There Goes My Everything" [2:58]
3. "It's Only Love" [3:11]
4. "I Lie A Lot" [2:45]
5. "You Took My Happy Away" [2:45]
6. "Swinging Doors" [3:00]

Side B

1. "A Way To Survive" [2:58]
2. "The Same Two Lips" [3:11]
3. "Enough To Lie" [2:42]
4. "Am I That Easy to Forget" [2:19]
5. "Just For The Record" [2:51]
