= Doug Bragg =

American singer

Doug Bragg (April 13, 1928 – March 13, 1973), born Douglas Clifton Bragg in Gilmer, Texas, was an American country musician and part of the Big D Jamboree. Throughout his music career, he continued his daytime profession as a butcher. He wrote many original songs, including "You’ll Have to Give (Just a Little)", "Whirlwind", "Calling Me Back", "One More Mistake", and "Remember". In the late 1950s, he formed a six-piece band called The Drifters, which included Earl Martin and Frank White. He made frequent appearances on the Louisiana Hayride.

== Family ==
He was married twice and had five sons from his first wife, Pinkie, and one from his second wife, Monte Oleta Petty. He also raised her son, Eddie. He died of a heart attack on March 13, 1973, at the age of 44. His son, Monte Clifton Bragg, is also a musician.

== Discography ==
Year	Title	Label #
1955	"Daydreamin'" / "The Texas Special"	Coral 61364
1956	"Tiger Lilly" / "Barbed Wire Love"	Coral 61716
1958	"Red Rover" / "Lovin' On My Mind"	Dixie 45-2002
1958	"Pretty Little Thing" / "Jerry"	Dixie 45-2004
1958	"If I Found My Dream Girl" / "Daydreaming Again"	D 1018
1959	"Calling Me Back" / "I'm All Alone"	D 1045
1959	"Whirlwind" / "I'm All Alone"	D 1045
1959	"Unfinished Castle" / "When The Blues Came Walking In"	D 1087
1959	"Juvenile Baby" / "Teen-Age Feeling" (with Cheri Robbins)	Skippy S-106/7-59
