= Talk to Your Heart =

Studio album by Ray Price
- Released: 1958
- Studio: Bradley Studios (Nashville, Tennessee)
- Genre: Country
- Label: Columbia
- Producer: Don Law

Ray Price chronology
Sings Heart Songs (1957)	Talk to Your Heart (1958)	Faith (1960)

Talk to Your Heart is a studio album by country music artist Ray Price. It was released in 1958 by Columbia Records (catalog no. CL-1148). AllMusic gave the album four-and-a-half stars. Reviewer George Bedard called it "a great collection" and "a real-life 'Texas-flavored' record by a honky tonk master." On November 17, 1958, it was rated No. 3 on Billboard magazine's "Favorite C&W Albums" based on the magazine's annual poll of country and western disc jockeys.

== Track listing ==
Side A

1. "Talk to Your Heart" (C.M. Bradley, Louise Ulrich) – 2:26
2. "I'll Keep On Loving You" (Tillman Franks) – 2:23
3. "I Love You So Much It Hurts" (Tillman Franks) – 3:00
4. "I Told You So" (Jimmie Davis, Rex Griffin) – 2:31
5. "Wondering" (Joe Werner) – 2:11
6. "Deep Water" (Fred Rose) – 2:35

Side B

1. "Ice-Cold Heart" (Benny Martin) – 2:03
2. "I've Gotta Have My Baby Back" (Tillman Franks) – 2:26
3. "There'll Be No Teardrops Tonight" (Hank Williams) – 2:42
4. "I'm Tired" (Mel Tillis, Ray Price) – 1:50
5. "Driftwood on the River" (Bob Miller, John Klenner) – 2:59
6. "Please Don't Leave Me" (Jesse Ashlock) – 2:05

== Personnel ==
- Ray Price – vocals
- Benny Martin, Clifton Howard Vandevender, Harold Bradley, Pete Wade – guitar
- Jimmy Day – steel guitar
- Tommy Jackson – fiddle
- Floyd "Lightnin'" Chance – bass
- Floyd Cramer – piano
- Buddy Harman – drums
