= Take Me as I Am (Ray Price album) =

Studio album by Ray Price
- Released: 1968
- Genre: Country
- Label: Columbia
- Producer: Don Law

Ray Price chronology
Ray Price's Greatest Hits, Volume II (1967)	Take Me as I Am (1968)	She Wears My Ring (1969)

Take Me as I Am is a studio album by country music artist Ray Price. It was released in 1968 by Columbia Records (catalog no. CL-9606).

The album debuted on Billboard magazine's country album chart on April 13, 1968, peaked at No. 5, and remained on the chart for a total of 17 weeks. The album included two singles that became Top 10 hits: "I'm Still Not Over You" (No. 6) and "Take Me as I Am (Or Let Me Go)" (No. 8).

AllMusic gave the album three stars.

== Track listing ==
Side A

1. "Take Me As I Am (Or Let Me Go)"
2. "Don't You Believe Her"
3. "Sittin' And Thinkin'"
4. "I'm Still Not Over You"
5. "I Can't Help It (If I'm Still in Love with You)"
6. "Walk Through This World With Me"

Side B

1. "Night Life"
2. "My Baby's Gone"
3. "Just Out Of Reach"
4. "Yesterday"
5. "In The Summer Of My Life"
