= Night Life (Ray Price album) =

Studio album by Ray Price
- Released: April 1963
- Genre: Country; honky-tonk
- Length: 37:36
- Label: Columbia
- Producer: Don Law, Frank Jones

Ray Price chronology
San Antonio Rose (1962)	Night Life (1963)	Love Life (1964)

Night Life is the sixth album by country music singer and guitarist Ray Price, backed by his regular touring band, the Cherokee Cowboys. The album was released in 1963 on the Columbia Records label. The album was included in Robert Dimery's 1001 Albums You Must Hear Before You Die.

== Reception ==
Night Life was Ray Price's first LP to hit the charts. It was released in April, 1963, but Billboard didn't start publishing a Country Album chart until January, 1964. At that time, it was still selling well enough to appear and in the chart's second week, it was the number one album, the first of five to reach #1 during Price's career.

Cub Koda in an Allmusic retrospective review felt that the album was "the last gasp of true honky tonk, the first stab at mainstreaming it into the Nashville sound of the 1960s, or country music's first concept album".

== Track listing ==
1. "Introduction and Theme / Night Life" (Walt Breeland, Paul Buskirk, Willie Nelson) - 2:05 / 4:41
2. "Lonely Street" (Carl Belew, Kenny Sowder, W.S. Stevenson) - 3:01
3. "The Wild Side of Life" (Arlie Carter, William Warren) - 2:59
4. "Sittin' and Thinkin'" (Charlie Rich) - 2:47
5. "The Twenty-Fourth Hour" (Ray Price) - 2:53
6. "A Girl in the Night" (Hank Thompson) - 2:49
7. "Pride" (Wayne P. Walker, Irene Stanton) - 2:39
8. "There's No Fool Like a Young Fool" (Bette Thomasson) - 2:58
9. "If She Could See Me Now" (Hank Cochran) - 2:42
10. "Bright Lights and Blonde Haired Women" (Eddie Kirkland) - 2:26
11. "Are You Sure" (Buddy Emmons, Willie Nelson) - 2:23
12. "Let Me Talk to You" (Don Stewart Davis, Danny Dill)- 3:05

== Personnel ==
- Ray Price - vocals, guitar
- Willie Nelson - vocals, bass guitar
- Johnny Paycheck - vocals, electric guitar, acoustic guitar, bass guitar, steel guitar
- Buddy Emmons - pedal-steel-guitar
- Floyd Cramer - piano
