= Billy Jack Saucier =

- Billy Jack Saucier and Joanie Waco during their performing days.

Background information
- Born: Billy Jack Saucier; January 21, 1931; Dallas, Texas
- Died: October 21, 1987 (aged 56)
- Instrument: Violin

Billy Jack Saucier (January 21, 1931 - October 21, 1987) was an acclaimed Grand National fiddler and a native of Dallas, Texas.

== Biography ==
As a child, Saucier studied classical violin and performed with the Oak Cliff Symphony Orchestra at the age of 15 where his exceptional talent was the starting point of a great career.

His passion for the fiddle and mastery of Western Swing lead to a performance with Hank Thompson and Leon McAuliffe in the 1950s where he was a regular at the Big D Jamboree in Dallas Texas with KRLD.

The artists that Saucier worked and or recorded with include Merle Haggard, Ralph Mooney and Roy Nichols.

In 1965 he joined the Joanie Waco Show where they played extensively around the country including Las Vegas, Nevada as well as military bases around the country. During this time Billy Jack and Joanie were married.

Saucier has played at the National Fiddlers Contest in Mt View, AR, the Roy Clarks Theatre in Branson, Missouri, the Grand Ole Opry in Nashville, Tennessee and numerous venues across the country. Saucier released his own album, Back In The Country, in 1974.

In April 1985, Billy Jack received the title of Grand National Fiddler (see award picture in Commons Category Billy Jack Saucier) from Ron Davis, president of Sweet, stating: “Yes, It is our opinion you are the best in the world today.” and “It is also our opinion that you are the best of all time to date.”

Saucier died in 1987. Joanie lives in Las Vegas.
