= The Lonesomest Lonesome =

Studio album by Ray Price
- Released: 1972
- Genre: Country
- Label: Columbia
- Producer: Don Law

Ray Price chronology
Welcome to My World (1971)	The Lonesomest Lonesome (1972)	Ray Price's All-Time Greatest Hits (1972)

The Lonesomest Lonesome is a studio album by country music artist Ray Price. It was released in 1972 by Columbia Records (catalog no. KC-31546).

The album debuted on Billboard magazine's country album chart on August 5, 1972, peaked at No. 3, and remained on the chart for a total of 16 weeks. It included the No. 2 hit single, "The Lonesomest Lonesome".

AllMusic gave the album two-and-a-half stars.

== Track listing ==
Side A

1. "The Lonesomest Lonesome"
2. "But I Was Lying"
3. "One Night to Remember"
4. "Just the Other Side of Nowhere"
5. "Empty Chairs"
6. "Time"

Side B

1. "That's What Leaving's About"
2. "Wake Up Yesterday"
3. "Over"
4. "This House"
5. "Oh, Lonesome Me"
