= You're the Best Thing That Ever Happened to Me (Ray Price album) =

Studio album by Ray Price
- Released: 1974
- Genre: Country
- Label: Columbia

Ray Price chronology
She's Got to Be a Saint (1973)	You're the Best Thing That Ever Happened to Me (1974)	This Time, Lord (1975)

You're the Best Thing That Ever Happened to Me is a studio album by country music artist Ray Price. It was released in 1974 by Columbia Records. The album peaked on Billboard magazine's country album chart at No. 24.

== Track listing ==
All songs written by Jim Weatherly.

Side A

1. "The Need to Be" (3:35)
2. "You Are a Song" (3:09)
3. "It Must Be Love This Time" (3:00)
4. "Where Peaceful Waters Flow" (3:29)
5. "To a Gentler Time (3:02)

Side B

1. "You're the Best Thing That Ever Happened to Me" (3:46)
2. "Some Things Never Change" (4:14)
3. "Storms of Troubled Times" (4:02)
4. "Like a First Time Thing" (2:29)
5. "Jesus Is My Kind of People" (3:22)
