= Joe Poovey =

American singer-songwriter, guitarist and DJ

- Also known as: Jumping Joe Poovey; Groove Joe Poovey; Groovey Joe Poovey; Johnny Dallas; Texas Joe Poovey
- Born: Arnold Joseph Poovey; May 10, 1941; Dallas, Texas, US
- Died: October 6, 1998 (aged 57); Dallas, Texas
- Genres: Rockabilly, country
- Occupations: Singer, musician, songwriter, disc jockey
- Instrument: Guitar
- Years active: 1953–1998
- Labels: Dixie, Azalea, Sims, Little Darlin', Carol, Donny, Leder, Misty Mountain, Sunjay

Arnold Joseph Poovey (May 10, 1941 – October 6, 1998), often credited on record and stage as "Groovey" Joe Poovey (in various alternate spellings), was an American rockabilly and country singer, songwriter, guitarist and radio disc jockey. His best known record was "Ten Long Fingers", recorded in 1958.

== Life and career ==
Born in Dallas, Texas, he was encouraged to be an entertainer as a child. He initially learned the steel guitar, and made his first recordings at the age of 10. Two years later, in 1953, he formed a group, the Hillbilly Boys, and started weekly broadcasts on radio station KRLD, soon followed by work as a disc jockey on the "Big D Jamboree" radio show. He also recorded several Christmas-themed songs, including "Santa's Helper", written by his father Bernice Poovey. After opening a show for Elvis Presley in 1955, he instantly changed his musical style from traditional country music to rockabilly. In 1957, as Jumping Joe Poovey, he recorded "Move Around" on the Dixie label, produced by Jim Shell in Dallas. It was followed the next year by "Ten Long Fingers", a tribute to Jerry Lee Lewis, on which he was credited as "Groove Joe Poovey" [sic]. Although the record was later acclaimed as a classic rockabilly number, featuring piano by local prodigy C.B. Oliver, it was only locally successful, and Poovey remained working in the Dallas and Fort Worth area, recording occasionally for small local labels.

In the 1960s he returned to playing country music and worked as a songwriter, his songs being recorded by such musicians as George Jones and Johnny Paycheck. In 1966, using the pseudonym Johnny Dallas, he recorded "Heart Full of Love", which reached no. 62 on the Billboard country chart. However, follow-ups failed to match its success, and he retired from performing to concentrate on his work as a disc jockey, working on various radio stations in the Dallas – Fort Worth area. In the 1970s, his earlier records began to be recognised by rockabilly fans in Europe, where he first performed in 1980, and unreleased recordings from the 1950s were made available. He also began recording again, releasing several new singles under the name Texas Joe Poovey. At the same time, he worked as a chauffeur on the film set of the Dallas TV series.

He continued to make regular visits to Britain and Europe, performing both country and rockabilly music, into the 1990s. Shortly before the release of a retrospective album, Golden Grooves, he died at the age of 57 from a heart condition.
