= Please Talk to My Heart =

Single by Ray Price

from the album Love Life
- B-side: "I Don't Know Why (I Keep Loving You)"
- Released: July 1964
- Genre: Country
- Label: Columbia
- Songwriters: Jimmy Lee Fautheree and Johnny Mathis

Ray Price singles chronology
"Burning Memories" (1964)	"Please Talk to My Heart" (1964)	"A Thing Called Sadness" (1964)

"Please Talk to My Heart" is a single by American country music artist Johnny "Country" Mathis. It was released in 1963, and peaked at number 14 on the Billboard Hot Country Singles chart. The song was written by Jimmy Lee Fautheree and Johnny Mathis.

The song was covered in 1964 by Ray Price. Price's version peaked at number 7 on the Billboard Hot Country Singles chart. It also reached number 1 on the RPM Country Tracks chart in Canada.

Freddy Fender also released a cover of the song in 1980. Fender's version peaked at number 82 on the Billboard Hot Country Singles chart.

== Chart performance ==
=== Johnny "Country" Mathis ===
Chart (1963)	Peak position
U.S. Billboard Hot Country Singles	14

=== Ray Price ===
Chart (1964)	Peak position
U.S. Billboard Hot Country Singles	7
Canadian RPM Country Tracks	1

=== Freddy Fender ===
Chart (1980)	Peak position
U.S. Billboard Hot Country Singles	82
