= Ray Price Sings Heart Songs =

Studio album by Ray Price
- Released: 1957
- Genre: Country
- Label: Columbia

Ray Price chronology
| Ray Price Sings Heart Songs (1957) | Talk to Your Heart (1958) |

Ray Price Sings Heart Songs is a studio album by country music artist Ray Price. It was released in 1957 by Columbia Records (catalog no. CL-1015). AllMusic gave the album four-and-a-half stars. In Billboard magazine's annual poll of country and western disc jockeys, it was ranked No. 1 among the "Favorite C&W Albums" of 1957.

== Track listing ==
Side A

1. "I Love You Because" (Leon Payne) - 2:50
2. "Let Me Talk to You" (Danny Dill, Don Davis) - 2:30
3. "Blues, Stay Away From Me" (Alton Delmore, Henry Glover, Rabon Delmore, Wayne Raney) - 2:25
4. "Many Tears Ago" (Jenny Lou Carson) - 3:20
5. "Letters Have No Arms" (Arbie Gibson, Ernest Tubb) - 2:55
6. "Faded Love" (Billy Jack Wills, Bob Wills, John Wills) - 2:40

Side B

1. "Remember Me (I'm the One Who Loves You)" (Stuart Hamblen) - 2:30
2. "I Saw My Castles Fall Today" (Ray Price, Rex Griffin)
3. "I'll Sail My Ship Alone" (Moon Mullican) - 2:35
4. "I Can't Help It" (Hank Williams) - 2:40
5. "A Mansion on the Hill" (Fred Rose, Hank Williams) - 2:25
6. "Pins and Needles" (Floyd Jenkins) - 2:05

== Personnel ==
- Ray Price - vocals
- Clifton Howard Vandevender, Grady Martin, Harold Bradley, James Selph, Pete Wade - guitar
- Jack Evins, Jimmy Day - steel guitar
- Tommy Jackson - fiddle
- Bob Moore, Buddy Killen - bass
- Floyd Cramer - piano
- Buddy Harman - drums
