= She Wears My Ring (album) =

Studio album by Ray Price
- Released: 1968
- Genre: Country
- Label: Columbia
- Producer: Don Law

Ray Price chronology
Take Me as I Am (1968)	She Wears My Ring (1968)	Sweetheart of the Year (1969)

She Wears My Ring is a studio album by country music artist Ray Price. It was released in 1968 by Columbia Records (catalog no. CS-9733).

The album debuted on Billboard magazine's country album chart on January 8, 1969, peaked at No. 6, and remained on the chart for a total of 21 weeks. The album included two singles that became Top 20 hits: "She Wears My Ring" (No. 6) and "I've Been There Before" (No. 11).

AllMusic gave the album three stars.

== Track listing ==
Side A

1. "She Wears My Ring"
2. "Little Green Apples"
3. "Set Me Free" (Curly Putman, Marvin Walters)
4. "Walking on the Grass" (Ray Pennington)
5. "Remembering" (Jerry Reed)
6. "Goin' Away" (George Tomsco)

Side B

1. "By the Time I Get to Phoenix"
2. "I'm Gonna Change Everything" (Alex Zanetis)
3. "Trouble" (William Lee Ellis / Jule Styne)
4. "I've Been There Before" (Bobby Gosh)
5. "Welcome to My World"
