= I'll Still Love You (Jim Weatherly song) =

Single by Jim Weatherly

from the album The Songs of Jim Weatherly
- B-side: "My First Day Without Her"
- Released: 1974
- Genre: Country
- Length: 3:53
- Label: Buddah Records
- Songwriter(s): Jim Weatherly

Jim Weatherly singles chronology
| "The Need to Be" (1974) | "I'll Still Love You" (1974) | "It Must Have Been the Rain" (1975) |

"I'll Still Love You" is a song written by American singer-songwriter Jim Weatherly. First recorded for Weatherly's 1974 album The Songs of Jim Weatherly, the single release peaked at No. 9 on the Billboard Hot Country Singles chart, No. 14 on the Billboard Easy Listening chart, and No. 87 on the Billboard Hot 100. It also charted in Canada.

== Chart performance ==
| Chart (1975) | Peak position |
|---|---|
| Canada RPM Adult Contemporary | 9 |
| Canada RPM Country | 23 |
| US Billboard Hot 100 | 87 |
| US Adult Contemporary (Billboard) | 14 |
| US Billboard Country | 9 |
