= Daniel Bernard Roumain =

American classical composer

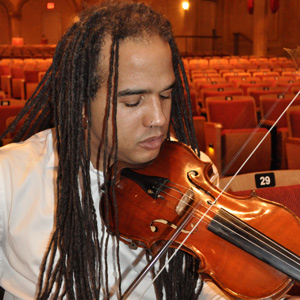
Daniel Bernard Roumain in Vancouver (2010)

Daniel Bernard Roumain (/ruːˈmeɪn/; known by his initials, DBR; born 1970) is a composer, performer, violinist, and band-leader, whose work combines classical music with jazz, hip-hop and rock.

== Composer ==
In September 2010, Dancers, Dreamers, and Presidents — an orchestral tone poem inspired by Ellen DeGeneres and then-senator Barack Obama — premiered at the New World Symphony.

DBR composed the opera, "We Shall Not Be Moved," in collaboration with librettist Marc Bamuthi Joseph, and director and choreographer Bill T. Jones. The opera premiered at Opera Philadelphia on September 16, 2017.

== Discography ==
- Threads with David S. Ware (Thirsty Ear, 2003)
- I, Composer (2004)
- String Quartet (2004)
- Pulsing (DBR Music, 2006)
- Etudes4Violin&Electronix (Thirsty Ear, 2007)
- The Need to Be with Ryuichi Sakamoto on the DJ Spooky album "Sound Unbound" (2008)
- Woodbox Beats & Balladry (Thirsty Ear, 2010)
