= Time (Ray Price album) =

Studio album by Ray Price
- Released: August 27, 2002
- Studio: The Sound Kitchen, Franklin, Tennessee
- Genre: Country
- Length: 37:46
- Label: Audium Records
- Producer: Fred Foster

Ray Price chronology
Prisoner of Love (2000)	Time (2002)	Beauty Is… The Final Sessions (2014)

Professional ratings
Review scores
Source	Rating
AllMusic	3/5 stars
Austin Chronicle	3.5/5 stars

Time is the 44th album by Ray Price, released by Audium Records, August 27, 2002, and the last to be released in his lifetime.

== Critical reception ==
Jim Smith of AllMusic writes, "Price is in excellent voice, astonishingly so at times, and it's a genuine pleasure to hear how well his talent has endured, even well into his seventh decade."

Jerry Renshaw reviews the album for The Austin Chronicle and gives it 3½ stars. He concludes his review by saying, "If you listen to his version of Howard's "What If I Say Goodbye" and don't feel a twinge, then you might want to make sure there's not a dead fish where your heart ought to be."

== Track listing ==
No.	Title	Writer(s)	Length
1.	"You Just Don't Love Me Anymore"	Joseph Allen; Jan Crutchfield	3:55
2.	"Fort Worth, Texas"	Cindy Walker	2:40
3.	"Time"	Max D. Barnes	3:55
4.	"Take Back Your Old Love Letters"	Ray Price	2:43
5.	"Both Sides Of Good Bye"	Kim Williams; Jackson Leap	3:44
6.	"If It's All The Same To You"	Arthur Hancock	3:10
7.	"No One But You"	Max D. Barnes	2:53
8.	"If You Think You're Lonely"	Linda Buell; Carl Rupp; Larry Johnson	3:21
9.	"I'm Not Leaving (I'm Just Getting Out Of Your Way)"	Hank Cochran; Royce Porter; Dean Rutherford	3:38
10.	"Next Voice You Hear"	Cindy Walker	2:20
11.	"What If I Say Goodbye"	Harlan Howard	3:19
12.	"Don't You Go Loving Nobody Else"	Cindy Walker	2:08
Total length:			37:46

Track information and credits adapted from the album's liner notes.

== Personnel ==
- Harold Bradley – acoustic guitar, bass guitar
- Buddy Harman – drums
- Bob Moore – bass
- Jimmy Capps – acoustic guitar
- Buddy Emmons – steel guitar
- Pete Wade – electric guitar
- David Briggs – piano, keyboards
- Rob Hajacos – fiddle
- Joe Caverlee – fiddle
- Buddy Jewell – harmony vocals
- Lisa Stewart – harmony vocals
- Greg Cole – harmony vocals
- Vince Gill – harmony vocals on "What If I Say Goodbye"

== Production ==
- Fred Foster – Producer
- Billy Sherrill – Engineer
- Drew Bollman – Engineering Assistant
- Jeff Chenault – Art Direction & Design
- Nancy Lee Andrews – Photography
- Emmy Harris – Grooming/Styling
