= Danny Boy (Ray Price album) =

Studio album by Ray Price
- Released: 1967
- Genre: Country
- Label: Columbia
- Producer: Don Law, Frank Jones

Ray Price chronology
Touch My Heart (1967)	Danny Boy (1967)	Ray Price's Greatest Hits, Volume II (1967)

Danny Boy is a studio album by country music artist Ray Price. It was released in 1967 by Columbia Records (catalog no. CL-2677).

The album debuted on Billboard magazine's country album chart on May 26, 1967, peaked at No. 3, and remained on the chart for a total of 35 weeks. The album included two singles that became Top 10 hits: "Soft Rain" (No. 3) and "Danny Boy" (No. 9).

AllMusic gave the album two stars.

== Track listing ==
Side A

1. "Danny Boy"
2. "Greensleeves"
3. "Across the Wide Missouri"
4. "Soft Rain"
5. "Pretend"

Side B

1. "Spanish Eyes"
2. "What's Come Over My Baby"
3. "Crazy"
4. "Born to Lose"
5. "Vaya Con Dios"
