= Ray Price Sings San Antonio Rose =

Studio album by Ray Price
- Released: 1962
- Studio: Bradley Studios (Nashville, Tennessee)
- Genre: Country
- Label: Columbia
- Producer: Don Law, Frank Jones

Ray Price chronology
Faith (1960)	Ray Price Sings San Antonio Rose (1962)	Night Life (1963)

Ray Price Sings San Antonio Rose: A Tribute to the Great Bob Wills is a studio album by country music singer Ray Price. It was recorded on September 25, 1961, at Bradley Studios in Nashville. It was released in 1962 by Columbia Records (catalog no. CS-8556). Price was backed on the album by some of Nashville's best musicians, including Grady Martin (guitar), Tommy Jackson (fiddle), Jimmy Day (pedal steel), Pig Robbins (piano), and Willie Nelson (acoustic guitar).

In Billboard magazine's annual poll of country and western disc jockeys, it was ranked No. 1 among the "Favorite Country Music LPs" of 1962.

AllMusic gave the album five stars.

== Track listing ==
Side A

1. "San Antonio Rose" (Bob Wills)
2. "A Maiden's Prayer" (Bob Wills)
3. "My Confession" (Bob Wills)
4. "Whose Heart Are You Breaking Now" (F. Jenkins)
5. "Roly Poly" (Fred Rose)
6. "Bubbles in My Beer" (Bob Wills, Cindy Walker, Tommy Duncan)

Side B

1. "Home in San Antone" (F. Jenkins)
2. "You Don't Love Me (But I'll Always Care)" (L. Wayne)
3. "You Don't Care What Happens to Me" (F. Rose)
4. "Time Changes Everything" (Tommy Duncan)
5. "The Kind of Love I Can't Forget" (J. Ashlock)
6. "Hang Your Head in Shame" (E. Nelson, Fred Rose, S. Nelson)
