= Jimmy & Johnny =

American country music duo

Jimmy & Johnny were an American country music duo composed of Jimmy Lee Fautheree and "Country" Johnny Mathis. They scored several hits on the U.S. country charts in the 1950s.

The duo's career began on the radio show Louisiana Hayride, where both were in demand as guests. They also appeared on the Big D Jamboree. In 1951 they were signed to Capitol Records; they also recorded for Feature Records and Chess Records. Their biggest hit was 1954's "If You Don't Somebody Else Will", which reached No. 4 on the U.S. country charts.

Johnny was later replaced by Jimmy's brother, Lynn Fautheree; but the name of the duo did not change, as the producers feared a career slump. Lynn brought the group's style closer to rockabilly with songs such as "Sweet Love on My Mind," "What'cha Doin' to Me" and "Sweet Singing Daddy". They played with Faron Young's group, the Deputies, and sometimes on the Grand Ole Opry, in addition to continuing to appear regularly on Louisiana Hayride. The song was written by Geraldine "Jerry" Hamilton. Lynn Fautheree married Dianne Hamilton, Geraldines daughter. Lynn and Dianne left the music business soon after the birth of their daughter Lisa Fautheree in 1959. At the end of the 1950s, after the Fautherees moved back to Texas, Lynn exited and Mathis returned to the duo, and they recorded together until 1961. In 1995, Johnny & Jimmy reunited for the first time since 1961, and released the gospel single "It Won't Be Much Longer".

== Singles ==
Year	Title	Label	Chart
1954	"If You Don't Somebody Else Will" / "I'm Beginning to Remember"	Feature Records	6
1954	"Don't Forget to Remember" / "Open for Trade" (B-Side with Jimmy Lee)	Capitol Records	
1954	"If You Don't Somebody Else Will" / "I'm Beginning to Remember"	Chess Records	4
1955	"Can't You, Won't You" / "The Fun Is Over"	Chess Records	
1955	"Love Me" / "Lips That Kiss So Sweetly"	Chess Records	70
1955	"Lips That Kiss So Sweetly" / "Love Me"	Chess Records	74
1956	"Sweet Singing Daddy" / "Trust Me"	Decca Records	
1956	"'Til the End of the World" / "Another Man's Name"	Decca Records	
1956	"Sweet Love on My Mind" / "Imagination"	Decca Records	
1957	"Here Comes My Baby" / "Don't Give Me That Look"	Decca Records	
1957	"What'cha Doin' To Me" / "I'll Do It Everytime"	Decca Records	
1958	"Can't Find The Doorknob" / "Keep Telling Me"	D Records	
1959	"My Little Baby" / "All I Need Is Time"	D Records	
1961	"Knock On Wood" / "Let Me Be The One"	Republic Records	
	"Nobody Knows Where I Go"	Not released	
	"I'm Gonna Lose"	Not released	

== Albums ==
Year	Title	Label	Chart
2000	If You Don't, Somebody Else Will	Bear Family Records	
