= She's Got to Be a Saint (album) =

Studio album by Ray Price
- Released: 1973
- Genre: Country
- Label: Columbia

Ray Price chronology
Ray Price's All-Time Greatest Hits (1972)	She's Got to Be a Saint (1973)	You're the Best Thing That Ever Happened to Me (1974)

She's Got to Be a Saint is a studio album by country music artist Ray Price. It was released in 1973 by Columbia Records (catalog no. KC-32033).

The album debuted on Billboard magazine's country album chart on April 14, 1973, peaked at No. 4, and remained on the chart for a total of 14 weeks. It included the No. 1 hit single, "She's Got to Be a Saint".

AllMusic gave the album three stars. Critic Greg Adams called it "short on variety but nicely consistent for fans of Price's ballad style."

== Track listing ==
Side A

1. "She's Got to Be a Saint"
2. "Turn Around, Look at Me"
3. "Sunday"
4. "Nobody Wins"
5. "Everything That's Beautiful (Reminds Me of You)"
6. "Goin' Away"

Side B

1. "Help Me"
2. "My Baby's Gone"
3. "Enough for You"
4. "The Sweetest Tie"
5. "I Keep Looking Back"
