= Gene O'Quin =

American singer-songwriter

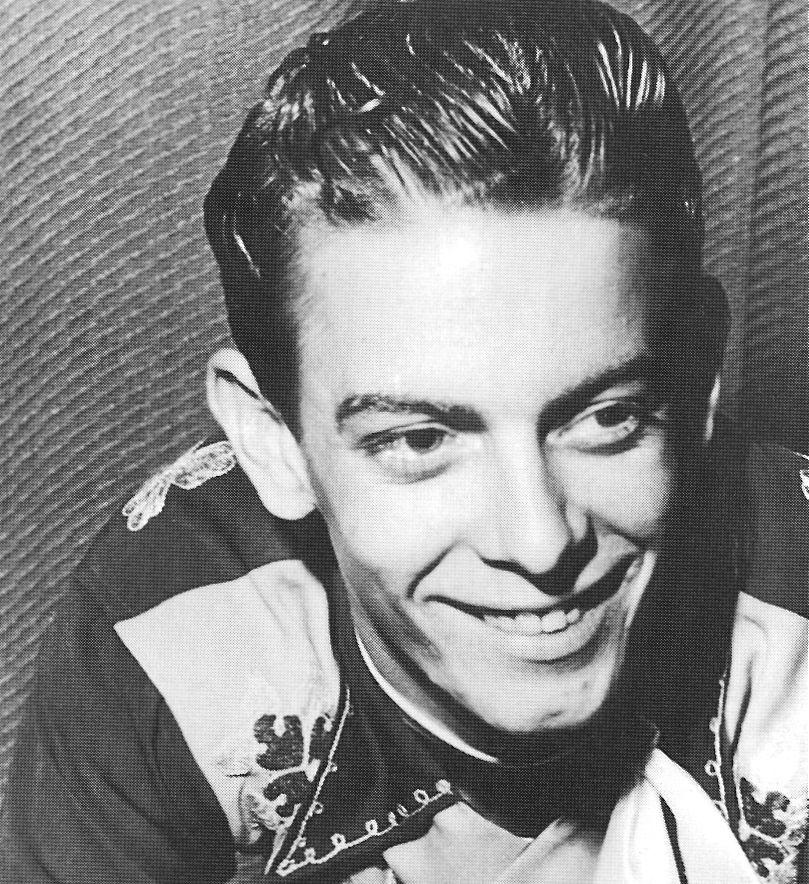
Gene O'Quin publicity picture

Gene Louis O'Quin (or Oquin) (September 9, 1932 – November 27, 1978) was an American country and western and honky tonk singer born in Dallas on September 9, 1932 He established himself professionally at Dallas' Big "D" Jamboree, a Grand Ole Opry-like radio showcase, becoming one of its most popular entertainers. O'Quin recorded his first song at the age of 15 and was signed by Capitol Records.

He later relocated to California. His recording career reached its peak between 1950 and 1955.

O'Quin's voice was high and nasally and had a twang evocative of Little Jimmy Dickens. He cut many novelty songs and boogie-woogie records. The persona in his records was happy-go-lucky and well suited to hillbilly music. Although he did not record any rockabilly songs in his career, rockabilly enthusiasts have embraced him. His career was eclipsed with the advent of rock and roll but he did not successfully make the transition as rockabilly artists did.

O'Quin died when his car was hit by a bus in Riverside, California on November 27, 1978.

== Discography ==
- "Boogie Woogie Fever"
- "It's No Use Talkin' Baby (I'm Through)" Capitol 1821
