= June Webb =

American singer-songwriter

- Born: September 22, 1934 (age 90); L'Anse, Michigan, U.S.
- Genres: Country
- Occupations: singer-songwriter, musician
- Instruments: Violin, guitar
- Labels: RCA Records, Hickory Records

June Webb (born September 22, 1934) is an American former country music singer-songwriter notable for the song "Looking Glass". She rose to fame in the early 1950s, and had a 11-year career in the country music industry.

Webb particularly experimented in the honky-tonk side of country music, but varied to gospel. She played the violin and the guitar, and was a talented instrumentalist. She was an inspiration for Loretta Lynn, who later used Webb's main line of her song in her song "Before I'm Over You."

== Childhood ==
Webb was born on September 22, 1934, in L'Anse, a village in the northern County of Baraga in Michigan. She had one sister, Shirley, and one brother, Ford. Her family were working-class, and musically inclined. The family moved to the Brownsville suburb of Miami, Florida in early 1937.

She took private dancing and singing lessons, and her father taught her how to play various instruments. Webb attended Earlington Heights Elementary School.

== Career ==
Growing up in the music industry, she begin performing from the age of 6 with her sister Shirley as the "Harmony Sweethearts". They did very well, becoming popular in hotels and various small venues throughout Miami. The sisters used to sing Carter Family songs, and Patsy Montana's million seller smash hit.

In early 1950, her family decided to go all in show business but as a family band. The family group toured the country, and performed with several Grand Ole Opry acts like Hank Williams. The family were scheduled to perform with Hank the night he died (January 1, 1953). The family moved to Nashville in 1951, due to their big success. Webb was the lead singer, despite being the youngest of three children.

Webb's soprano voice became noticeable, and she went solo performing on her own in stints at the Grand Ole Opry. In 1954, she signed with RCA Records on a $200 a week contract, but this ended in 1956 after having no success.

She signed with the Roy Acuff show as the group's female singer in 1957. One magazine article called her "The Prettiest Smokey Mountain Boy", and Billboard magazine gave her its "Most Promising Female Artist" award as voted on by country & western disc jockeys.

Webb auditioned for Hickory Records in 1959 after Roy Acuff urged them to sign her, and she found herself signing with them a month later. However, before the first recording session she fell off a horse and suffered a broken/fractured leg. This delayed the recording session for three months, as she had a two-month hospital stay and one month of recuperation at home.

She recorded for Hickory from 1959 until 1964, with three successful songs and five singles released. Her appearances with Acuff's show took her all over the world, including Europe and the Caribbean. She led a very private life. She became a member of the Grand Ole Opry in April 1961, performing regularly on their radio show.

== Retirement and private life ==
Webb performed her biggest hit, "Looking Glass", at the Opry on July 30, 1964, when she announced that she was leaving the Roy Acuff show. To the disappointment of the public, she left in September 1964, and was on the verge of retirement, according to a Nashville newspaper. She left Hickory Records in November 1964, but despite plenty of papers saying Webb had retired, she continued to perform within the US for another three months. She officially retired in February 1965, though occasionally performed in smaller venues through the mid-1960s. She continued to live a private life in South Nashville.
