= Helen Hall =

Auctioneer and appraiser in the US

Helen Hall is a music and film memorabilia appraiser and the founder of Dig Appraisals. She previously served as a vice-president at Christie's and has worked with musicians, actors, directors, private collectors, auction houses, and museums on the research, appraisal, and valuation of music and film memorabilia, including music archives.

Hall was Head of Entertainment Memorabilia at Christie's, New York. During her time at Christie's, Hall was involved in bringing to auction collections and celebrity estates including the personal property Of Marlon Brando (2004); 40 Years Of Star Trek (2006); The Estate Of Clark Gable (2006); The Estate Of Stan Laurel (2007); The John Lennon Collection of “Magic” Alex Mardas (2004); The Star Wars Collection Of John Mollo (2003); Eric Clapton's Guitars in aid of the Crossroads Centre (1999 and 2004).

As a Christie's auctioneer, Hall has been involved with artifacts such as Marlon Brando's script for The Godfather, John Lennon's hand-written lyrics for "Give Peace A Chance" and the drum from the cover of the Beatles LP Sgt. Pepper's Lonely Hearts Club Band.

In 2008, Hall launched Dig Appraisals to work with musicians, actors, film directors, models, politicians and celebrities to preserve and archive their career-related assets. Dig Appraisals provides Appraisals, Archival and Collection Management services. She has worked with the David Bowie Archive, the Tom Petty Estate, the Audrey Hepburn Foundation and many others. Privately, Helen has also brokered important sales of rock memorabilia, including Kurt Cobain's Fender Mustang guitar. Hall has also consulted for Christie's, Bonhams and Phillips auction houses and works closely with museums and institutions including the Victoria and Albert Museum, London.

Most recently, Hall consulted for Christie's auction house on the record-breaking Jim Irsay auction, the highest ever grossing auction of memorabilia, making $94.5 Million and smashing records including a world record price of $14.5 Million for a guitar
