= Jim Weatherly =

American singer-songwriter (1943–2021)

- Born: James Dexter Weatherly; March 17, 1943; Pontotoc, Mississippi, U.S.
- Died: February 3, 2021 (aged 77) Brentwood, Tennessee, U.S.
- Genres: Country, pop
- Occupation: Singer-songwriter
- Instrument: Vocals
- Years active: 1965–2021
- Labels: RCA; Buddah; Brizac

James Dexter Weatherly (March 17, 1943 – February 3, 2021) was an American singer-songwriter who wrote mostly pop and country music. He played quarterback at the University of Mississippi while also writing music with his own bands. He subsequently chose songwriting over a football career. His notable songs include "The Need to Be" and "Midnight Train to Georgia".

== Early life ==
Weatherly was born in Pontotoc, Mississippi, on March 17, 1943. He attended Pontotoc High School, where he was an all-star quarterback for the school's football team. He also started writing songs and formed his own bands during this time.

He went on to study at the University of Mississippi. He was a backup quarterback on the Ole Miss Rebels football team that was undefeated in 1962. The team successfully defended their Southeastern Conference championship the following season with Weatherly as their starting quarterback. He subsequently received honorable mention All-American honors in 1964. Upon graduating, he chose to pursue music over a career in football.

== Career ==
=== Songwriting ===
Weatherly wrote songs for almost 50 years. His best-known song is "Midnight Train to Georgia", recorded by Gladys Knight & the Pips. It peaked at number 1 on the pop and R&B charts, and went on to win a Grammy Award. The song was subsequently inducted into the Grammy Hall of Fame in 1999, and was chosen by the National Endowment for the Arts and the Recording Industry Association of America as No. 29 of the 365 Songs of the Century. Ray Price has recorded 38 of Weatherly's songs. Both Gladys Knight & the Pips (in 1972) and Bob Luman (in 1973) had top five records with "Neither One of Us". Other artists who have recorded Weatherly's songs include: Glen Campbell, Kenny Rogers, Asha Puthli, Neil Diamond, Kenny Chesney and Garth Brooks.

Gladys Knight and the Pips have recorded twelve other Weatherly compositions, such as "Neither One of Us (Wants to Be the First to Say Goodbye)" and "Best Thing That Ever Happened to Me". That version of "Neither One of Us" became his first number one pop record in Cashbox and Record World magazine charts, and became a number one R&B record. It was followed by "Where Peaceful Waters Flow", "Midnight Train to Georgia" and "Best Thing That Ever Happened to Me", which were all pop and R&B hits. Weatherly's catalog includes songs that have been performed by Ray Price, Lynn Anderson, Brenda Lee, Bob Luman, and Batdorf & Rodney.

==== Weatherly vs. Universal Music Publishing Group ====
Weatherly filed a lawsuit against Universal Music Publishing Group (UMPG) in October 2002, which is now considered a landmark case in the entertainment community. He claimed that he was underpaid royalties for "Midnight Train to Georgia" for years. Universal Music argued that Weatherly could not proceed on his action because the one-year contractual limitations frequently found in entertainment contracts, had passed or tolled. This became the issue that the Ninth Circuit Court of Appeals decided, in a published decision which set new legal precedent. Most contracts allow an artist to look back for a maximum of one, two or three years retroactively. However, the court decided in Weatherly vs. Universal Music Publishing Group that this one-year time limitation would not apply. "A defendant cannot hinder the plaintiff's discovery through misrepresentation and then fault the plaintiff for failing to investigate", the court wrote, referring to a Ninth Circuit Court of Appeals decision. Because the landmark decision was published by that court, other artists could cite this decision to support independent claims that they had also been underpaid royalties.

=== Recording ===
Weatherly made his recording debut with "Jim Weatherly & The Vegas" on 20th Century Fox Records in 1965. He then formed The Gordian Knot with one LP released by Verve Records and later reissued on CD by Rev-Ola Records. He was offered a solo recording contract with Buddah Records after the success of "Georgia", and he released a number of albums in the 1970s. As an artist, Weatherly had a pop and adult contemporary hit with "The Need to Be" and a country hit with "I'll Still Love You".

Weatherly's songs have been used in movies and TV shows such as Broadcast News, Modern Family, Chicago Hope, Ally McBeal, and others.

== Awards ==
Weatherly was inducted into the Nashville Songwriters Hall of Fame in 2006. Five years later, he was enshrined into the Mississippi Musicians Hall of Fame. He was inducted into the Songwriters Hall of Fame in 2014. He was also conferred the Governor’s Award for Excellence in Music by the government of Mississippi that same year.

== Death ==
Weatherly died from natural causes at his home in Brentwood, Tennessee, on February 3, 2021, at the age of 77.

== Discography ==
Source: AllMusic

=== Albums ===
Year	Title	Chart Positions			Label
Year	Title	US Country	US	CAN	Label
1972	Weatherly	—	—	—	RCA
1973	A Gentler Time	—	—	—	RCA
1973	Jim Weatherly	—	—	—	RCA
1974	The Songs of Jim Weatherly	—	94	94	Buddah
1975	Magnolias & Misfits	45	—	—	Buddah
1976	Pictures & Rhymes	—	—	—	Brizac
1976	The People Some People Choose to Love	—	—	—	Brizac
2001	Dancing Moon	—	—	—	Brizac
2003	Songs I've Written	—	—	—	Brizac
2004	Christmas Like Christmas Used to Be	—	—	—	Brizac
2008	Autumn Lights	—	—	—	Brizac

=== Singles ===
Source: AllMusic, unless otherwise stated.

Year	Title	Chart Positions					
Year	Title	US Country	US	US AC	CAN Country	CAN	CAN AC
1973	"Loving You Is Just an Old Habit"	—	116	—	—	—	—
1974	"The Need to Be"	—	11	6	—	13	17
1975	"I'll Still Love You"	9	87	14	23	—	9
1975	"It Must Have Been the Rain"	58	—	—	46	—	—
1977	"All That Keeps Me Going"	27	—	—	—	—	—
1979	"Smooth Sailin'"	32	—	—	—	—	—
1980	"Gift from Missouri"	34	—	—	—	—	—
1980	"Safe in the Arms of Love (Cold in the Streets)"	82	—	—	—	—	—
