= I Won't Mention It Again =

Single by Ray Price

from the album I Won't Mention it Again
- B-side: "Kiss the World Goodbye"
- Released: February 1971
- Genre: Country
- Label: Columbia
- Songwriter(s): Cam Mullins; Carolyn Jean Yates
- Producer(s): Don Law

Ray Price singles chronology
"For the Good Times" (1970)	"I Won't Mention It Again" (1971)	"I'd Rather Be Sorry" (1971)

"I Won't Mention It Again" is a 1971 single written by Cameron "Cam" Mullins and Carolyn Jean Yates, and recorded by Ray Price. "I Won't Mention it Again" was Ray Price's sixth number one on the country chart. The single stayed at number one for three weeks and spent a total of seventeen weeks on the country chart. "I Won't Mention it Again also charted on the US Hot 100, and Easy Listening charts.

== Chart performance ==
Chart (1971)	Peak position
U.S. Billboard Hot Country Singles	1
U.S. Billboard Hot 100	42
U.S. Billboard Easy Listening	4
Canadian RPM Country Tracks	1
