= For the Good Times (song) =

1968 song by Kris Kristofferson

Single by Bill Nash
- A-side: "We Had All The Good Things Going"
- Released: 1968
- Genre: Country
- Label: Smash
- Songwriter: Kris Kristofferson
- Producer: Jerry Kennedy

Official audio
- "For the Good Times" on YouTube

"For the Good Times"

Single by Ray Price

from the album For the Good Times
- B-side: "Grazin' in Greener Pastures"
- Released: June 1970
- Recorded: March 1970
- Studio: Columbia Studio A (Nashville, Tennessee)
- Genre: Country
- Length: 3:47
- Label: Columbia
- Songwriter: Kris Kristofferson
- Producer: Don Law

Ray Price singles chronology
"You Wouldn't Know Love" (1970)	"For the Good Times" (1970)	"I Won't Mention It Again" (1971)

Official audio
- "For the Good Times" on YouTube

"For the Good Times" is a song written by Kris Kristofferson, first recorded by singer Bill Nash in 1968 before appearing on Kristofferson's own debut album in June 1970. After a recording by Ray Price became a #1 hit single in June of that year, the song established Kristofferson as one of country and popular music's top songwriters while giving Price his first chart-topping country and western song in 11 years.

"For the Good Times" continued to be recorded by a number of artists in subsequent years, to popular success. It became a staple of soul singer Al Green's concert repertoire in the 1970s, also featuring as a studio recording on his 1972 album I'm Still in Love with You. A version by Perry Como spent 27 weeks on the UK Singles Chart peaking at #7 in August 1973 and spent 13 weeks on the Irish Singles Chart, peaking at #1 for 2 weeks in November 1973.

In June 2026, CBS News included the song in its list of the 250 essential American songs of the past 250 years.

== Composition ==
Kristofferson wrote most of the song in 1968 while on a work-related road trip from Nashville to the Gulf of Mexico. It recounts the end of a love affair, based on a real life experience of his, in a manner that popular music scholar Steve Sullivan said "conveys sadness, acceptance, and longing".

An early recording of the song was by Bill Nash on Smash Records in 1968. Kristofferson's own recording appeared on self-titled debut album in June 1970.

== Ray Price's recording ==
Ray Price recorded the song on March 16, 1970, accompanied by an orchestra in Nashville's Columbia Studio A.

Price's recording was released as a single and made its chart debut on June 27, 1970, topping the country and western chart for one week and reaching #11 on the pop singles chart. "For the Good Times" was Price's fifth #1 single and spent 19 weeks on the chart. It was also his only release to hit the Top 40 of the pop chart. Originally Price's label, Columbia Records, had released the song as the "B" side of the single, but switched to promoting "For the Good Times" after Wayne Newton recorded his own version of the tune. The flip side, "Grazin' in Greener Pastures," did receive credit on the country music chart.

At the 1971 Academy of Country Music awards, "For the Good Times" won in the category of "Song of the Year" (for Kristofferson as composer) and "Single of the Year" (for Price). In 2014, Rolling Stone named Price's recording #18 on its "40 Saddest Country Songs of All Time". Kacey Musgraves has said it "might be the saddest song of all time. It really breaks my heart."

It was featured in television commercials promoting ESPN's coverage of the 2014–15 College Football Playoff.

=== Charts ===
Chart (1970)	Peak position
Australia (Kent Music Report)	32
U.S. Billboard Hot Country Singles	1
U.S. Billboard Hot 100	11
U.S. Billboard Hot Adult Contemporary Tracks	9
Canadian RPM Country Tracks	2
Canadian RPM Top Singles	13
Canadian RPM Adult Contemporary Tracks	10

== Notable covers ==
Elvis Presley covered the song in a studio recording in 1972, but this version wasn't released until 1995 in a posthumously released box set. He also notably performed the song at Madison Square Garden in 1972, which was released on the subsequent live album for the show.
