= She's Got to Be a Saint (song) =

Single by Ray Price

from the album She's Got to Be a Saint
- B-side: "Oh Lonesome Me"
- Released: November 1972
- Recorded: 1972
- Genre: Country
- Length: 3:49
- Label: Columbia
- Songwriter(s): Joe Paulini; Mike DiNapoli
- Producer(s): Don Law

Ray Price singles chronology
"The Lonesomest Lonesome" (1972)	"She's Got to Be a Saint" (1972)	"You're the Best Thing That Ever Happened to Me" (1973)

"She's Got to Be a Saint" is a 1972 single by Ray Price. "She's Got to Be a Saint" was Ray Price's seventh number one on the country chart. The single stayed a number one for three weeks and spent a total of fourteen weeks on the country chart.

== Chart performance ==
Chart (1972)	Peak position
U.S. Billboard Hot Country Singles	1
U.S. Billboard Hot 100	93
Canadian RPM Country Tracks	2
