= I Won't Mention It Again (album) =

Studio album by Ray Price
- Released: 1971
- Genre: Country
- Length: 35:14
- Label: Columbia
- Producer: Don Law

Ray Price chronology
For the Good Times (1970)	I Won't Mention It Again (1971)	Welcome to My World (1971)

I Won't Mention It Again is a studio album by country music artist Ray Price. It was released in 1971 by Columbia Records (catalog no. C-30510).

The album debuted on Billboard magazine's country album chart on June 12, 1971, held the No. 1 spot for five weeks, and remained on the chart for a total of 42 weeks. It also won the Country Music Association Award for Album of the Year. It included two hit singles: "I Won't Mention It Again" (No. 1) and "I'd Rather Be Sorry" (No. 2).

AllMusic gave the album three stars.

== Track listing ==
Side A

1. "I Won't Mention It Again"
2. "Kiss the World Goodbye"
3. "Sunday Morning Comin' Down"
4. "The Burden of Freedom"
5. "Forgive My Heart"
6. "I'd Rather Be Sorry"

Side B

1. "Lovin' Her Was Easier (Than Anything I'll Ever Do Again)"
2. "Bridge Over Troubled Water"
3. "When I Loved Her"
4. "Sweet Memories"
5. "Jesse Younger"
