= For the Good Times (Ray Price album) =

Studio album by Ray Price
- Released: 1970
- Studio: Columbia Studio A (Nashville, Tennessee)
- Genre: Country
- Length: 32:40
- Label: Columbia
- Producer: Don Law

Ray Price chronology
The World of Ray Price (1970)	For the Good Times (1970)	I Won't Mention It Again (1971)

For the Good Times is a studio album by country music artist Ray Price. It was released in 1970 by Columbia Records (catalog no. C-30106).

The album debuted on Billboard magazine's country album chart on September 5, 1970, held the No. 1 spot for nine weeks, and remained on the chart for a total of 120 weeks. It was the best-selling album of Price's career. It included three No. 1 or No. 2 hits: "For the Good Times" (No. 1); "Crazy Arms (No. 1); and "Heartaches by the Number" (No. 2).

For the Good Times was Kris Kristofferson's first No. 1 hit as a songwriter. The album also included another Kristofferson song, "Help Me Make It Through the Night", which became a No. 1 hit when it was covered later in the year by Sammi Smith.

AllMusic gave the album four-and-a-half stars.

== Track listing ==
Side A

1. "For the Good Times" (Kris Kristofferson)
2. "Gonna Burn Some Bridges" (Mel Tillis)
3. "Crazy Arms" (Chuck Seals, Ralph Mooney)
4. "I'll Go to a Stranger" (Dave Kirby, Ray Pennington)
5. "Black and White Lies" (Buck Fowler, Jimmy Fowler)
6. "Grazin' in Greener Pastures" (Ray Pennington)

Side B

1. "Help Me Make It Through the Night" (Kris Kristofferson)
2. "Lonely World" (Elbert West)
3. "You Can't Take it with You" (Hal Bynum, Jim Kandy)
4. "A Cold Day in July" (Dave Kirby, Glenn Martin)
5. "Heartaches by the Number" (Harlan Howard)

== Charts ==
=== Weekly charts ===
Chart (1970–1971)	Peak position
US Billboard 200	28
US Top Country Albums (Billboard)	1

=== Year-end charts ===
Chart (1970)	Position
US Top Country Albums (Billboard)	33
Chart (1971)	Position
US Billboard 200	41
US Top Country Albums (Billboard)	2
Chart (1972)	Position
US Top Country Albums (Billboard)	4
