= Jimmy Lee Fautheree =

American singer-songwriter

- Born: April 11, 1934; Smackover, Arkansas, United States
- Died: June 29, 2004 (aged 70); Dallas, Texas, United States
- Genres: Rockabilly, country
- Occupation: Singer
- Labels: Capitol Records; Decca Records; Paula Records

Jimmy Lee Fautheree (April 11, 1934 - June 29, 2004) was an American rockabilly and country singer.

Born in Smackover, Arkansas, he began playing guitar at age 12, and was heavily influenced by Merle Travis. In 1946 his family moved to Dallas, where he played on KRLD's Big D Jamboree. By 1951 he was playing on the Louisiana Hayride; that year he signed to Capitol Records and released his first single, "I Keep the Blues All the Time", as Jimmy Lee. Capitol released seven further singles from Fautheree before dropping him in 1952. Despite never charting, the recordings have been cited as influential on later rockabilly artists, including James Burton.

Fautheree subsequently found work as a session musician for musicians such as Faron Young and Webb Pierce. Along with "Country" Johnny Mathis, he performed on Louisiana Hayride as Jimmy & Johnny, and released a charting single under the "Jimmy Lee & Johnny Mathis" moniker on Chess Records, 1954's "If You Don't, Somebody Else Will". Fautheree left Mathis to work with Wayne Walker, a partnership that lasted only four months but yielded a few recordings. Following this he began recording with his brother Lynn, again under the name Jimmy & Johnny; they signed to Decca Records, but by 1957 the pair had moved back to Dallas.

Fautheree went back to solo recording, recording in New Orleans in 1958 at J&M Studio. He recorded briefly with Mathis again between 1958 and 1959. Some self-released material and a single on Paula Records brought him into 1960, and throughout the next decade Fautheree worked increasingly in the genre of gospel music.

By the 1970s Fautheree had left the business, working in asbestos removal. In 1995, he returned to music with Mathis, recording a new single, "It Won't Be Much Longer", together. He played both in the U.S. and abroad in the 2000s, and released a full-length album with Deke Dickerson entitled I Found the Doorknob. Shortly after the album was complete he died of cancer in Dallas on June 29, 2004.

His mother's name was Lodema Hammonds, the daughter of Mack Hammonds of Maud, Texas, who was a descendant of Phillip Hamman, the Savior of the Greenbrier.

== Discography ==
Year	Title	Record label
1951	Love Is Hard To Understand / I Keep the Blues All The Time	Capitol Records
1951	Go Ahead and Go / Knocking On Your Front Door	Capitol Records
1951	Lips That Kiss So Sweetly / I’ve Got A Broken Heart	Capitol Records
1952	Suspense / Warm Warm Kisses	Capitol Records
1952	I’m Diggin’ A Hole To Bury My Heart / Kisses By Mail	Capitol Records
1952	Blowin’ And Goin’ / Mistakes	Capitol Records
1953	How About A Date / Cryin’ Won’t Change My Mind	Capitol Records
1955	Lips That Kiss So Sweetly / Love Me (with Wayne Walker)	Chess Records
1958	Teenage Wedding / Baby It’s Love (as Johnny Angel)	Vin Records
1966	Git / Can’t Find The Doorknob	Paula Records
1966	Keep Me In Mind / Belle Of Monterrey	Paula Records
1974	Project X-9 (Instr.) / I’m The Laziest Man In The World	Lodema Records
197?	If You Want To Be Saved / Fellowship With Jesus	Lodema Records
197?	I Just Can’t Keep On / One Day Smiling	Lodema Records
unknown	This Ole House / Heaven Is Only Knee High	Little Richie Records
1963	EP: Nobody Knows Where You Go; Please Talk To My Heart; Taffy Town (by Fran Powers); Goin’ Steady (by Fran Powers)	Towne House Records
