= "Country" Johnny Mathis =

American country music singer-songwriter (1930–2011)

- Born: John Mathis; September 28, 1930; Maud, Texas, U.S.
- Died: September 27, 2011 (aged 80) Cornersville, Tennessee
- Genres: Country
- Occupations: Singer-songwriter
- Years active: 1951–1999
- Labels: United Artists, Decca Records
- Formerly of: Jimmy & Johnny, Johnny Paycheck, George Jones

"Country" Johnny Mathis (September 28, 1930 – September 27, 2011) was an American country music singer and songwriter. He was a successful solo performer and one half of the duo Jimmy & Johnny. Mathis is credited with penning more than 500 tunes over the course of his long career.

== Biography ==
John Mathis was born in Maud, Texas, United States. He played on Louisiana Hayride from 1953 to 1960, as a solo artist and as a member of the musical duo Jimmy & Johnny (with Jimmy Lee Fautheree). Mathis left the group to go solo in the middle of the 1950s, leaving Fautheree's brother, Lynn, to fill his shoes. Jimmy and Lynn, however, saved the name Jimmy & Johnny, which proved ideal for Mathis who returned to the group from 1959 to 1961. As a solo artist, he released several singles for D Records, Decca, United Artists, and Little Darlin'. His final charting single was "Please Talk to My Heart", released in 1963. He also encountered significant success as a songwriter, penning songs for Johnny Paycheck, Faron Young, George Jones, Charley Pride and Webb Pierce among others. For few decades, until the late 1990s, he sang both country gospel music, and focused on his family.

Mathis suffered a stroke in February 1999, and was no longer able to perform. The stroke left him in poor health until his death in Cornersville, Tennessee, on September 27, 2011, one day shy of his 81st birthday. He died on the same day as fellow country singer-songwriter Johnnie Wright. His wife, Jeannie Mathis, died on September 14, 2019. His daughter, Sherry Craver, died on April 26, 2020, and he is survived by his three sons, John Jr., Bill and James Mathis.

== Singles (selected) ==
- "I've Been Known to Cry"
- "Just Do the Best You Can"
- "Welcome Home"
- "Country Music Keeps on Growing"
- "Make Me One More Memory"
- "Harbor of Love"
- "Please Talk to My Heart" (1963) - U.S. Country No. 14

== Sources ==
- Johnny "Country" Mathis profile, AllMusic; accessed September 26, 2016
