= Ray Price =

American singer (1926–2013)

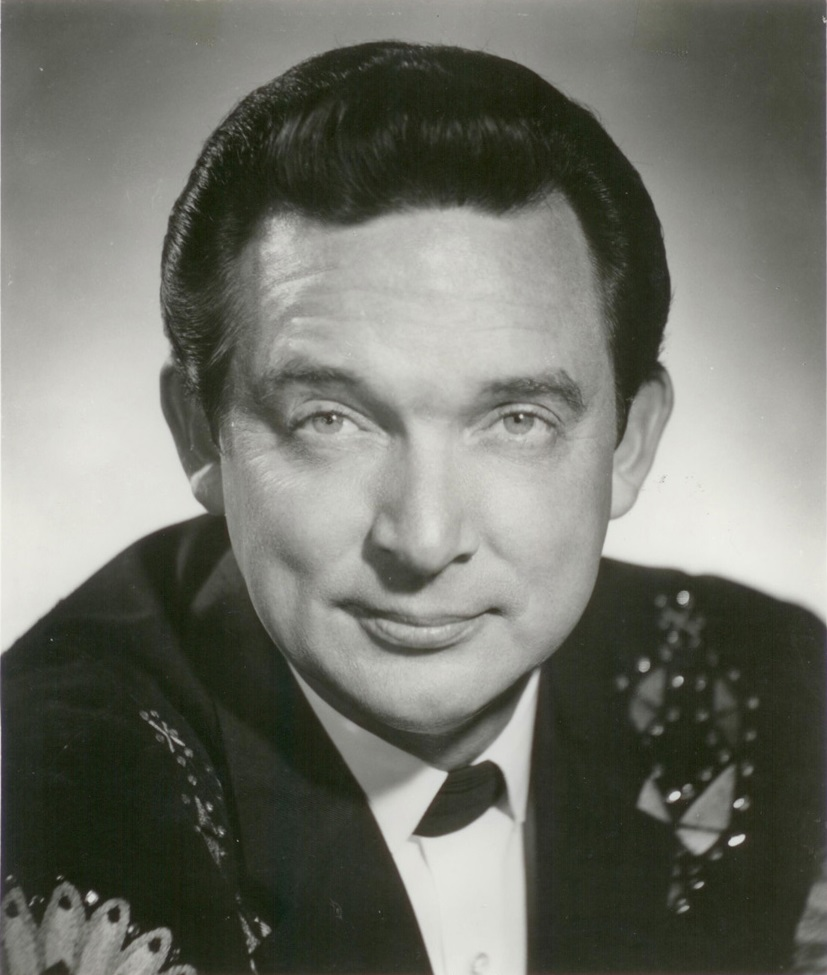
- Price, ca. 1968

Background information
- Also known as: The Cherokee Cowboy
- Born: Noble Raymond Price; January 12, 1926; Wood County, Texas, U.S.
- Died: December 16, 2013 (aged 87) Mount Pleasant, Texas, U.S.
- Genres: Country; Western swing; western; honky-tonk; traditional pop
- Occupations: Singer; songwriter; musician
- Instruments: Vocals; guitar
- Years active: 1948–2013
- Labels: Columbia; Myrrh; ABC; Monument; Dimension; Viva; Step One

Noble Raymond Price (January 12, 1926 – December 16, 2013) was an American country music singer, songwriter, and guitarist. His wide-ranging baritone is regarded as among the best male voices of country music, and his innovations, such as propelling the country beat from 2/4 to 4/4, known as the "Ray Price beat", helped make country music more popular.

Some of his well-known recordings include "Release Me", "Crazy Arms", "Heartaches by the Number", "For the Good Times", "Night Life", and "You're the Best Thing That Ever Happened to Me". He was elected to the Country Music Hall of Fame in 1996. He continued to record and tour into his 80s.

== Early life ==
Ray Price was born on a farm near the small former community of Peach, near Perryville, Wood County, Texas. He was the son of Walter Clifton Price and Clara Mae Bradley Cimini. His grandfather, James M. M. Price, was an early settler in the area. Price was three years old when his parents divorced and his mother moved to Dallas, Texas. For the rest of his childhood he split time between Dallas and on the family farm, where his father had remained. Price's mother and stepfather were successful fashion designers and wanted him to take up that line of work, but it had little appeal to him.

Price began singing and playing guitar as a teenager, but at first chose a career in veterinary medicine. He was attending North Texas Agricultural College in preparation for that career, when his studies were interrupted by America's entry into World War II. Price was drafted in 1944 and served in the United States Marine Corps in the Pacific Theater. He returned to the college after the war, and in 1972, was honored as a distinguished alumnus.

== Music career ==
=== 1940s–1950s success ===
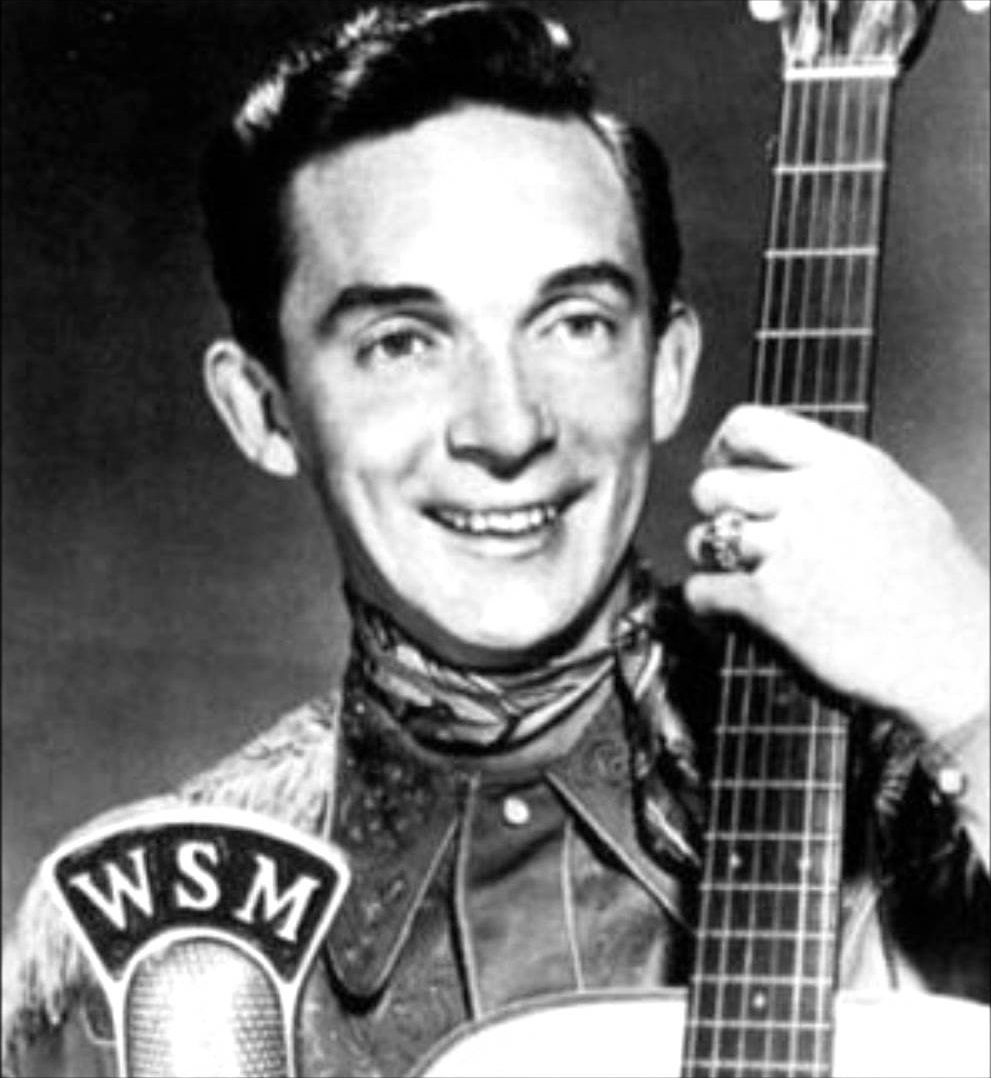
Price in a Grand Ole Opry publicity picture

After the war and college, Price rethought his decision to continue schooling to be a veterinarian; he was considered too small to work with large cattle and horses, the backbone of a Texas veterinarian's practice then. While helping around his father's ranch, he also began singing at various functions around the Abilene, Texas, area. This eventually led him to begin singing on the radio program Hillbilly Circus broadcast on Abilene's KRBC in 1948. He joined the Big D Jamboree on Dallas radio station KRLD (AM) in 1949, and when the show was picked up for broadcast on the CBS radio network soon afterward, Price had his first taste of national exposure. Around this time, Ray Price became friends with Lefty Frizzell. The two first met at Beck Recording Studio in Dallas, and Price ended up writing the song "Give Me More, More, More of Your Kisses" for Frizzell's use. A few demonstrations recorded by Price at Beck's caught the attention of Bullet Records in Nashville, Tennessee, and he was signed to his first recording contract. His first single released on Bullet, though, "Jealous Lies", failed to become a chart hit.

He relocated to Nashville in the early 1950s, rooming for a brief time with Hank Williams. When Williams died, Price managed his band, the Drifting Cowboys, and had minor success. He was the first artist to have a success with the song "Release Me" (1954), a top-five popular music hit for Engelbert Humperdinck in 1967. In 1953, Price formed his band, the Cherokee Cowboys. Among its members during the late 1950s and early 1960s were Roger Miller, Willie Nelson, Darrell McCall, Van Howard, Johnny Paycheck, Johnny Bush, Buddy Emmons, and Buddy Spicher. Miller wrote one of Ray Price's classics in 1958, "Invitation to the Blues", and sang harmony on the recording. Additionally, Nelson composed the Ray Price song, "Night Life". Price became one of the stalwarts of 1950s honky tonk music, with hit songs such as "Talk to Your Heart" (1952) and "Release Me".

=== 1960–2000s: Nashville sound to gospel ===
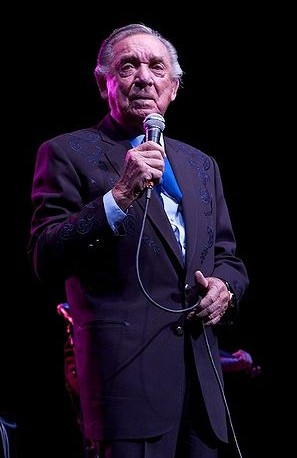
Price in 2009

During the 1960s, Ray experimented increasingly with the so-called Nashville sound, singing slow ballads and using lush arrangements of strings and backing singers. Examples include his 1967 rendition of "Danny Boy", and the Kris Kristofferson composition "For the Good Times" in 1970, which was Price's first country music chart number-one hit since "The Same Old Me" in 1959. The song also scored number 11 on the popular music chart and featured a mellower Price backed by sophisticated musical sounds, quite in contrast to the honky-tonk sounds Price had pioneered two decades before. Price had three more number-one country music successes during the 1970s: "I Won't Mention It Again", "She's Got To Be A Saint", and "You're the Best Thing That Ever Happened to Me" (the last of which was a pop hit in Canada, and would gain greater fame a year later when Gladys Knight and the Pips covered it).

Price's final top-10 hit was "Diamonds in the Stars" in early 1982. Price continued to have songs on the country music chart through 1989. Later, he sang gospel music and recorded such songs as "Amazing Grace", "What A Friend We Have In Jesus", "Farther Along", and "Rock of Ages". Price briefly made national news again in 1999 when he was arrested for possession of marijuana. According to Price in a 2008 interview, old friend Willie Nelson — no stranger to marijuana arrests — phoned and told him he had just earned $5 million in free publicity with the drug bust.

In 2009, he made two performances for the Fox News show Huckabee. The first was with the Cherokee Cowboys and host Mike Huckabee, and he performed "Crazy Arms" and "Heartaches by the Number". Weeks later, he performed with the Cherokee Cowboys and Willie Nelson (again with Huckabee playing bass guitar). This time, they performed duets of "Faded Love" and "Crazy". Price worked on his last album, Last of the Breed, with fellow country music singers Willie Nelson and Merle Haggard. This album was released on March 20, 2007, by Lost Highway Records. The two-disc set features 20 country classics and two new compositions. The trio toured the U.S. from March 9 until March 25, starting in Arizona and finishing in Illinois. This was Price's third album with Nelson and first album with Haggard. After the tour, Haggard remarked, "I told Willie when it was over, 'That old man gave us a goddamn singing lesson.' He really did. He just sang so good. He sat there with the mic[rophone] against his chest. And me and Willie are all over the microphone trying to find it, and he found it."

== Cancer and death ==
On November 6, 2012, Price confirmed that he was fighting pancreatic cancer. Price told the San Antonio Express-News that he had been receiving chemotherapy for the past six months. An alternative to the chemo would have been surgery that involved removing his pancreas along with portions of the stomach and liver, which would have meant a long recovery and stay in a nursing home. He said, "That's not very much an option for me. God knows I want to live as long as I can, but I don't want to live like that." He told the newspaper, "The doctor said that every man will get cancer if he lives to be old enough. I don't know why I got it – I ain't old!"

Although in February 2013, the cancer appeared to be in remission, Price was hospitalized in May 2013 with severe dehydration. On December 2, 2013, Price entered a Tyler, Texas, hospital in the final stages of pancreatic cancer, according to his son, then left on December 12 for home hospice care. Price died at his home in Mt. Pleasant, Texas, on December 16, 2013, at age 87. Price was interred at Restland Memorial Park in Dallas.

== Personal life ==
After leaving Nashville, Price lived his time off the road on his East Texas ranch near Mount Pleasant, continuing to dabble in raising game fowl, cattle, and horses. Ray Price married twice. His first wife and he divorced in the late 1960s. Price married his second wife Janie on June 11, 1970, and they remained together until his death. A son from his first marriage, Cliff Price, also survives.

== Industry awards ==
Academy of Country Music

- 1970 Album of the Year – For the Good Times
- 1970 Single of the Year – "For the Good Times"

Country Music Association

- 1971 Album of the Year – I Won't Mention It Again

Country Music Hall of Fame and Museum

- Inducted in 1996

Grammy Awards

- 1971 Best Male Country Vocal Performance – "For the Good Times"
- 2008 Best Country Collaboration with Vocals with Willie Nelson – "Lost Highway"

== See also ==
- Country Music Association
- Academy of Country Music
- Inductees of the Country Music Hall of Fame (1996 Inductee)
