= Billboard Top Country & Western Records of 1953 =

Billboard Top Country & Western Records of 1953 is made up of two year-end charts compiled by Billboard magazine ranking the year's top country and western records based on record sales and juke box plays.

Hank Williams died on January 1, 1953, but still dominated the 1953 country and western charts. He had five songs on the year-end charts, and "Kaw-Liga" and "Your Cheating Heart" were the year's No. 1 and No. 2 selling country records. In addition, Jack Cardwell's "The Death of Hank Williams" ranked No. 19 on the year-end chart.

On the juke box chart, "Mexican Joe" by newcomer Jim Reeves was the No. 1 most-played record of 1953.

Retail year-end	Juke box year-end	Peak (Note: This column recites the record's peak position on Billboard's weekly charts.)	Title	Artist(s)	Label
1	3	1	"Kaw-Liga"	Hank Williams	M-G-M
2	2	1	"Your Cheating Heart"	Hank Williams	M-G-M
3	4	1	"No Help Wanted	The Carlisles	Mercury
4	7	1	"A Dear John Letter"	Jean Shepard, Ferlin Husky	Capitol
5	6	1	"Hey Joe"	Carl Smith	Columbia
6	1	1	"Mexican Joe"	Jim Reeves	Abbott
7	10	1	"I Forgot More Than You'll Ever Know"	The Davis Sisters	RCA Victor
8	9	1	"It's Been So Long"	Webb Pierce	Decca
9	8	1	"Take These Chains from My Heart"	Hank Williams	M-G-M
10	14	3	"(Now and Then There's) A Fool Such as I	Hank Snow	RCA Victor
11	18	1	"Eddy's Song"	Eddy Arnold	RCA Victor
12	25	4	"Last Waltz"	Webb Pierce	Decca
13	5	1	"Rub-A-Dub-Dub"	Hank Thompson	Capitol
14	17	1	"I'll Never Get Out of This World Alive"	Hank Williams	M-G-M
15	15	5	"Bumming Around"	T. Texas Tyler	Decca
16	26	2	"(How Much Is) That Hound Dog in the Window"	Homer & Jethro	RCA Victor
17	20	4	"Crying in the Chapel"	Rex Allen	Decca
18	15	1	"Jambalaya (On the Bayou)"	Hank Williams	M-G-M
19	NR	3	"The Death of Hank Williams"	Jack Cardwell	M-G-M
20	21	1	"Caribbean"	Mitchell Torok	Abbott
21	NR		"Let Me Be the One"	Hank Locklin	4 Star
22	NR	2	"Trademark"	Carl Smith	Columbia
23	NR	1	"There Stands the Glass"	Webb Pierce	Decca
24	NR	4	"This Orchid Means Goodbye"	Carl Smith	Columbia
25	27	3	"Spanish Fire Ball"	Hank Snow	RCA Victor
26	NR		"I'll Go Alone"	Webb Pierce	Decca
27	NR		"Tennessee Wig Walk"	Bonnie Lou	King
28	NR	4	"Free Home Demonstration"	Eddy Arnold	RCA Victor
29	NR		"Seven Lonely Days"	Bonnie Lou	King
30	11		"Back Street Affair"	Webb Pierce	Decca
NR	12		"Don't Let the Stars Get in Your Eyes"	Skeets McDonald	Capitol
NR	13		"I Let the Stars Get in My Eyes"	Goldie Hill	Decca
NR	19		"Keep It a Secret"	Slim Whitman	Imperial
NR	22		"Don't Let the Stars Get in Your Eyes"	Slim Willet	4 Star
NR	23		"I Couldn't Keep From Crying"	Marty Robbins	Columbia
NR	24		"Crying in the Chapel"	Darrell Glenn	Valley
NR	28		"Midnight"	Red Foley	Decca
NR	29		"That's Me Without You"	Webb Pierce	Decca
NR	30	4	"Gal Who Invented Kissing"	Hank Snow	RCA Victor

== See also ==
- List of Billboard number-one country songs of 1953
- Billboard year-end top 30 singles of 1953
- 1953 in country music
