= List of Billboard number-one country songs of 1953 =

Jim Reeves had his first number one in 1953.

In 1953, Billboard magazine published three charts covering the best-performing country music songs in the United States: Most Played in Juke Boxes, National Best Sellers, and Most Played By Jockeys. The three charts had been published since 1944, 1948 and 1949 respectively. All three charts are considered part of the lineage of the multimetric Hot Country Songs chart, which was first published in 1958.

In the issue of Billboard dated January 3, Hank Williams was at number one on both the best sellers and jockeys charts with "Jambalaya (On the Bayou)", retaining a position it had held on both listings since the final issue of 1952. Williams thus held the top spot when he died in the early hours of January 1, 1953. Following his death, Williams achieved considerable chart success in the first half of 1953, particularly on the best sellers chart. He returned to number one on that listing later in January with the final single released in his lifetime, "I'll Never Get Out of This World Alive", and went on to have two further posthumous number ones with "Take These Chains from My Heart" and "Kaw-Liga", the latter of which spent 13 consecutive weeks at number one, the year's longest unbroken run atop any of the three charts. His total of 19 weeks at number one on the retail listing (including one when he tied for the top spot) was the most achieved by any act, and he achieved the same feat on both the juke box and jockeys charts, with 10 and 15 weeks at number one respectively. "Your Cheatin' Heart", which fell short of the number one position on the best sellers chart, topped both the other listings, meaning that five songs by Williams reached number one on one or more of the charts in 1953. Regarded as one of the most influential musicians in country music history, Williams was among the inaugural class of entrants to the Country Music Hall of Fame in 1961.

Seven acts achieved their first number ones in 1953: the Carlisles, Goldie Hill, Jim Reeves, the duo of Jean Shepard and Ferlin Husky, the Davis Sisters, Mitchell Torok, and Hank Locklin. In addition to having his first number one as a performer with "Caribbean", Torok also wrote the song "Mexican Joe", which gave Jim Reeves his first chart-topper. Hill's chart-topper "I Let the Stars Get In My Eyes" was only the second country number one by a solo female artist; it was written as an answer song to "Don't Let the Stars Get in Your Eyes" by Slim Willet, which had begun the year at number one on the juke box chart. "I Forgot More Than You'll Ever Know" would prove to be the only charting song for the Davis Sisters, who were not actually related. Two months before it topped the charts one half of the duo, Betty Jack Davis, had been killed in an automobile accident. Surviving member Skeeter Davis would go on to have a long solo career, scoring top 20 country successes well into the 1970s and achieving some pop success, but she would never achieve a solo number one. At the end of the year "I Forgot More Than You'll Ever Know" was at number one on the juke box chart, Webb Pierce topped the best sellers chart with "There Stands the Glass" and Hank Locklin held the top spot on the jockeys chart with "Let Me Be the One".

== Chart history ==
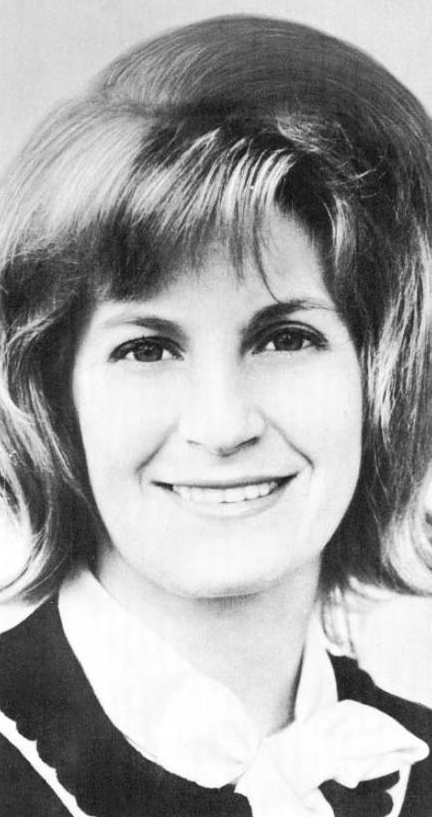
Skeeter Davis topped the chart in 1953 as one half of the duo the Davis Sisters. She would go on to have a lengthy and successful solo career but never achieved a chart-topping solo single.

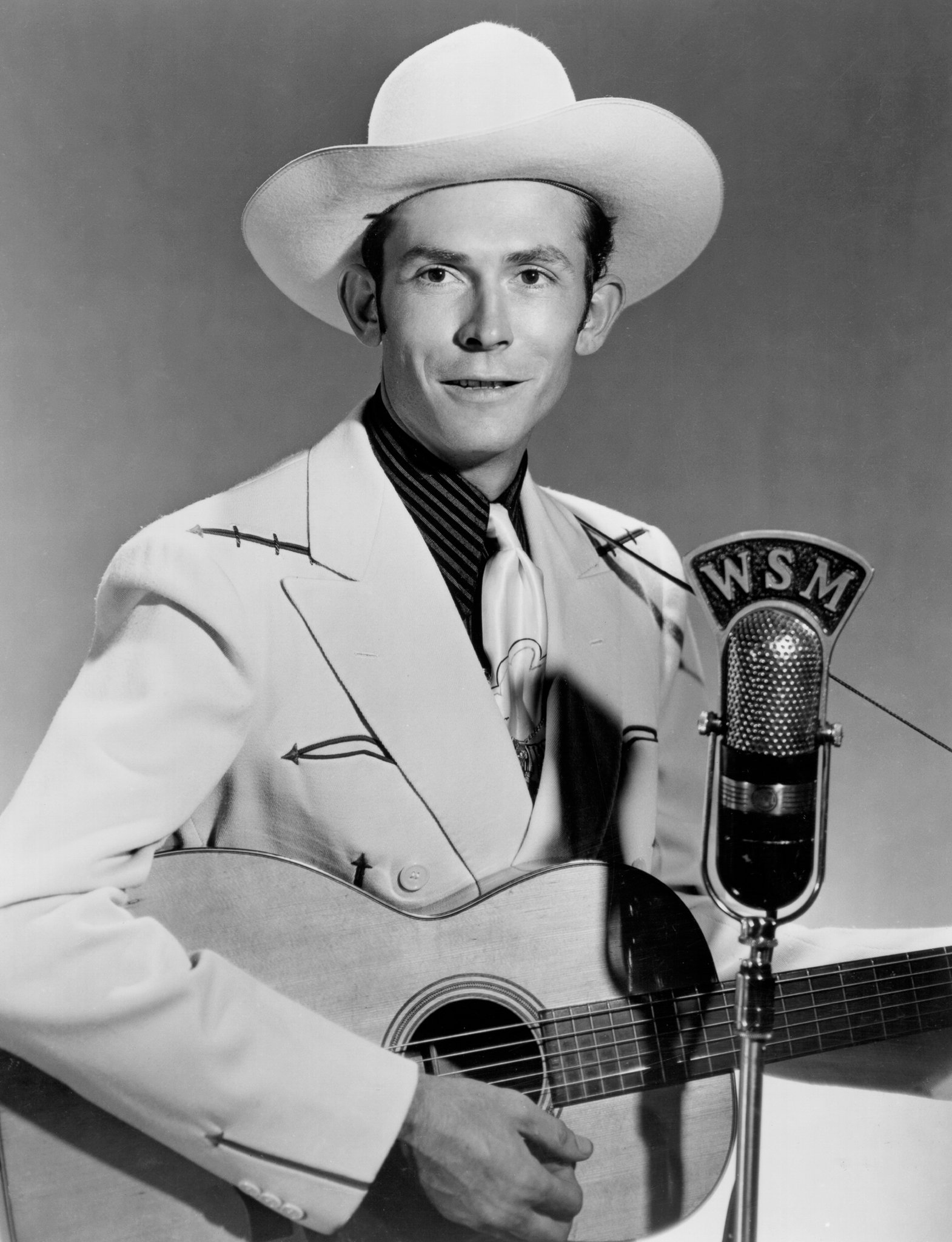
Hank Williams had four number ones on the best sellers chart in 1953. He died on January 1 of the year.

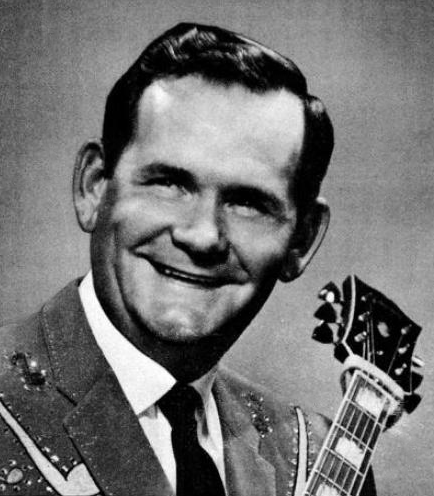
Hank Locklin ended the year at number one on the jockeys chart.

Issue date	Juke Box		Best Sellers		Jockeys		Ref.
Issue date	Title	Artist(s)	Title	Artist(s)	Title	Artist(s)	Ref.
January 3	"Don't Let the Stars Get in Your Eyes"	Skeets McDonald	"Jambalaya (On the Bayou)"	Hank Williams	"Jambalaya (On the Bayou)"	Hank Williams	
January 10	"Don't Let the Stars Get in Your Eyes"	Skeets McDonald	"Midnight"	Red Foley	"Back Street Affair"	Webb Pierce	
January 17	"Back Street Affair"	Webb Pierce	"Jambalaya (On the Bayou)"	Hank Williams	"Back Street Affair"	Webb Pierce	
January 24	"Back Street Affair"	Webb Pierce	"I'll Never Get Out of This World Alive"	Hank Williams	"I'll Go On Alone"	Marty Robbins	
January 31	"Back Street Affair"	Webb Pierce	"Eddy's Song"	Eddy Arnold	"No Help Wanted"	The Carlisles	
February 7	"I Let the Stars Get In My Eyes"	Goldie Hill	"Eddy's Song"	Eddy Arnold	"I'll Go On Alone"	Marty Robbins	
February 14	"I Let the Stars Get In My Eyes"	Goldie Hill	"Eddy's Song"	Eddy Arnold	"No Help Wanted"	The Carlisles	
February 21	"I Let the Stars Get In My Eyes"	Goldie Hill	"Kaw-Liga"	Hank Williams	"No Help Wanted"	The Carlisles	
February 28	"Kaw-Liga"	Hank Williams	"Kaw-Liga"	Hank Williams	"No Help Wanted"	The Carlisles	
March 7	"Kaw-Liga"	Hank Williams	"Kaw-Liga"	Hank Williams	"Kaw-Liga"	Hank Williams	
March 14	"Kaw-Liga"	Hank Williams	"Kaw-Liga"	Hank Williams	"Kaw-Liga"	Hank Williams	
March 21	"Kaw-Liga"	Hank Williams	"Kaw-Liga"	Hank Williams	"Kaw-Liga"	Hank Williams	
March 28	"Kaw-Liga"	Hank Williams	"Kaw-Liga"	Hank Williams	"Kaw-Liga"	Hank Williams	
April 4	"Kaw-Liga"	Hank Williams	"Kaw-Liga"	Hank Williams	"Kaw-Liga"	Hank Williams	
April 11	"Your Cheatin' Heart"	Hank Williams	"Kaw-Liga"	Hank Williams	"Kaw-Liga"	Hank Williams	
April 18	"Kaw-Liga"	Hank Williams	"Kaw-Liga"	Hank Williams	"Kaw-Liga"	Hank Williams	
April 25	"Kaw-Liga"	Hank Williams	"Kaw-Liga"	Hank Williams	"Kaw-Liga"	Hank Williams	
May 2	"Your Cheatin' Heart"	Hank Williams	"Kaw-Liga"	Hank Williams	"Your Cheatin' Heart"	Hank Williams	
May 9^{[a]}	"No Help Wanted"	The Carlisles	"Mexican Joe"	Jim Reeves	"Your Cheatin' Heart"	Hank Williams	
May 9^{[a]}	"No Help Wanted"	The Carlisles	"Kaw-Liga"	Hank Williams	"Your Cheatin' Heart"	Hank Williams	
May 16	"No Help Wanted"	The Carlisles	"Kaw-Liga"	Hank Williams	"Your Cheatin' Heart"	Hank Williams	
May 23	"No Help Wanted"	The Carlisles	"Mexican Joe"	Jim Reeves	"Your Cheatin' Heart"	Hank Williams	
May 30	"No Help Wanted"	The Carlisles	"Mexican Joe"	Jim Reeves	"Your Cheatin' Heart"	Hank Williams	
June 6^{[a]}	"Mexican Joe"	Jim Reeves	"Mexican Joe"	Jim Reeves	"Mexican Joe"	Jim Reeves	
June 6^{[a]}	"Mexican Joe"	Jim Reeves	"Take These Chains from My Heart"	Hank Williams	"Mexican Joe"	Jim Reeves	
June 13	"Mexican Joe"	Jim Reeves	"Mexican Joe"	Jim Reeves	"Mexican Joe"	Jim Reeves	
June 20	"Mexican Joe"	Jim Reeves	"Mexican Joe"	Jim Reeves	"Mexican Joe"	Jim Reeves	
June 27	"Mexican Joe"	Jim Reeves	"Take These Chains from My Heart"	Hank Williams	"Mexican Joe"	Jim Reeves	
July 4	"Mexican Joe"	Jim Reeves	"Take These Chains from My Heart"	Hank Williams	"Mexican Joe"	Jim Reeves	
July 11^{[a]}	"Mexican Joe"	Jim Reeves	"Take These Chains from My Heart"	Hank Williams	"Mexican Joe"	Jim Reeves	
July 11^{[a]}	"Mexican Joe"	Jim Reeves	"It's Been So Long"	Webb Pierce	"Mexican Joe"	Jim Reeves	
July 18	"Mexican Joe"	Jim Reeves	"It's Been So Long"	Webb Pierce	"Your Cheatin' Heart"	Hank Williams	
July 25^{[b]}	"Mexican Joe"	Jim Reeves	"It's Been So Long"	Webb Pierce	"Mexican Joe"	Jim Reeves	
July 25^{[b]}	"Mexican Joe"	Jim Reeves	"It's Been So Long"	Webb Pierce	"It's Been So Long"	Webb Pierce	
August 1	"Rub-A-Dub-Dub"	Hank Thompson	"It's Been So Long"	Webb Pierce	"It's Been So Long"	Webb Pierce	
August 8	"Rub-A-Dub-Dub"	Hank Thompson	"It's Been So Long"	Webb Pierce	"It's Been So Long"	Webb Pierce	
August 15	"Mexican Joe"	Jim Reeves	"It's Been So Long"	Webb Pierce	"It's Been So Long"	Webb Pierce	
August 22	"It's Been So Long"	Webb Pierce	"Hey Joe"	Carl Smith	"It's Been So Long"	Webb Pierce	
August 29	"Rub-A-Dub-Dub"	Hank Thompson	"A Dear John Letter"	Jean Shepard and Ferlin Husky	"It's Been So Long"	Webb Pierce	
September 5	"Hey Joe"	Carl Smith	"A Dear John Letter"	Jean Shepard and Ferlin Husky	"It's Been So Long"	Webb Pierce	
September 12	"Hey Joe"	Carl Smith	"A Dear John Letter"	Jean Shepard and Ferlin Husky	"Hey Joe"	Carl Smith	
September 19	"Hey Joe"	Carl Smith	"Hey Joe"	Carl Smith	"It's Been So Long"	Webb Pierce	
September 26	"Hey Joe"	Carl Smith	"A Dear John Letter"	Jean Shepard and Ferlin Husky	"Hey Joe"	Carl Smith	
October 3	"Hey Joe"	Carl Smith	"A Dear John Letter"	Jean Shepard and Ferlin Husky	"Hey Joe"	Carl Smith	
October 10	"A Dear John Letter"	Jean Shepard and Ferlin Husky	"A Dear John Letter"	Jean Shepard and Ferlin Husky	"Hey Joe"	Carl Smith	
October 17	"Hey Joe"	Carl Smith	"I Forgot More Than You'll Ever Know"	The Davis Sisters	"I Forgot More Than You'll Ever Know"	The Davis Sisters	
October 24	"Hey Joe"	Carl Smith	"I Forgot More Than You'll Ever Know"	The Davis Sisters	"I Forgot More Than You'll Ever Know"	The Davis Sisters	
October 31	"A Dear John Letter"	Jean Shepard and Ferlin Husky	"I Forgot More Than You'll Ever Know"	The Davis Sisters	"I Forgot More Than You'll Ever Know"	The Davis Sisters	
November 7	"Hey Joe"	Carl Smith	"I Forgot More Than You'll Ever Know"	The Davis Sisters	"I Forgot More Than You'll Ever Know"	The Davis Sisters	
November 14	"I Forgot More Than You'll Ever Know"	The Davis Sisters	"I Forgot More Than You'll Ever Know"	The Davis Sisters	"I Forgot More Than You'll Ever Know"	The Davis Sisters	
November 21	"A Dear John Letter"	Jean Shepard and Ferlin Husky	"There Stands the Glass"	Webb Pierce	"I Forgot More Than You'll Ever Know"	The Davis Sisters	
November 28	"A Dear John Letter"	Jean Shepard and Ferlin Husky	"I Forgot More Than You'll Ever Know"	The Davis Sisters	"I Forgot More Than You'll Ever Know"	The Davis Sisters	
December 5	"There Stands the Glass"	Webb Pierce	"There Stands the Glass"	Webb Pierce	"There Stands the Glass"	Webb Pierce	
December 12	"Caribbean"	Mitchell Torok	"There Stands the Glass"	Webb Pierce	"I Forgot More Than You'll Ever Know"	The Davis Sisters	
December 19	"Caribbean"	Mitchell Torok	"There Stands the Glass"	Webb Pierce	"Let Me Be the One"	Hank Locklin	
December 26	"I Forgot More Than You'll Ever Know"	The Davis Sisters	"There Stands the Glass"	Webb Pierce	"Let Me Be the One"	Hank Locklin	

a. Two songs tied for number one on the best sellers chart.
b. Two songs tied for number one on the jockeys chart.

== See also ==
- 1953 in country music
- List of artists who reached number one on the U.S. country chart
