= 1953 in country music =

This is a list of notable events in country music that took place in the year 1953.

== Events ==
- January 1 — Hank Williams, due to play a New Year's Day show in Canton, Ohio, dies sometime after midnight in the rear seat of his Cadillac, somewhere between Knoxville, Tennessee, and Oak Hill, West Virginia. He was 29. Stories conflict on what happened in the final hours of his life, but what is not disputed is that his death gave rise to the legend. In the 60-plus years following his death, Williams' songs would be covered countless times, singers and songwriters would directly cite him as an influence, and his son – Hank Williams, Jr. - then 3, would become a star in his own right. The last song released in his lifetime was "I'll Never Get Out of This World Alive."

== Top hits of the year ==
=== Number one hits ===
==== United States ====
(as certified by Billboard)

Date	Single Name	Artist	Wks. No.1	Spec. Note
January 10	Midnight	Red Foley	1	Foley's first Billboard Number One since "Goodnight Irene" in 1950.
January 24	I'll Go On Alone	Marty Robbins	2	^{[A], [2]}
January 24	I'll Never Get Out of This World Alive	Hank Williams with His Drifting Cowboys	1	The first of four posthumous Number Ones recorded by Hank Williams.
January 31	No Help Wanted	The Carlisles	4	^{[B]}
January 31	Eddy's Song	Eddy Arnold	3
February 7	I Let the Stars Get In My Eyes	Goldie Hill	3	^{[B]}: With this song, Goldie Hill became the second solo female artist to have a Number One country single.
February 21	Kaw-Liga	Hank Williams with His Drifting Cowboys	13	^{[1]}
April 11	Your Cheatin' Heart	Hank Williams with His Drifting Cowboys	6	^{[2]}
May 9	Mexican Joe	Jim Reeves	9	^{[A], [2]}
June 6	Take These Chains from My Heart	Hank Williams with His Drifting Cowboys	4	^{[2]}
July 11	It's Been So Long	Webb Pierce	8	^{[2]}
August 1	Rub-a-Dub-Dub	Hank Thompson and His Brazo Valley Boys	3	^{[2]}
August 22	Hey Joe	Carl Smith	8	^{[2]}
August 29	A Dear John Letter	Ferlin Husky and Jean Shepard	6	^{[B] – Jean Shepard [2]}
October 17	I Forgot More Than You'll Ever Know	The Davis Sisters	8	^{[B], [2]}: The first Billboard Number One by a female country act, a record that would remain until The Judds with "Mama He's Crazy" in 1984.; This song became a posthumous Number One hit after the death of member Betty Jack Davis in a car accident in August.
November 21	There Stands the Glass	Webb Pierce	12	^{[2]}
December 12	Caribbean	Mitchell Torok	2	^{[B]}
December 19	Let Me Be the One	Hank Locklin	3	^{[A], [2]}

Notes

- 1 No. 1 song of the year, as determined by Billboard.
- 2 Song dropped from No. 1 and later returned to top spot.
- A First Billboard No. 1 hit for that artist.
- B Only Billboard No. 1 hit for that artist.

Note: Several songs were simultaneous No. 1 hits on the separate "Most Played in Juke Boxes," "Most Played by Jockeys" and "National Best Sellers" charts.

=== Other major hits ===
US	Single	Artist
5	Bumming Around	Jimmy Dean
5	Bumming Around	T. Texas Tyler
4	Crying in the Chapel	Rex Allen
4	Crying in the Chapel	Darrell Glenn
7	Dear Joan	Jack Cardwell
3	Death of Hank Williams	Jack Cardwell
9	Divorce Granted	Ernest Tubb
6	Do I Like It?	Carl Smith
8	Don't Let the Stars Get in Your Eyes	Red Foley
9	Don't Throw Your Life Away	Webb Pierce
3	Fool Such as I	Hank Snow
10	For Now and Always	Hank Snow
4	Forgive Me, John	Jean Shepard and Ferlin Husky
4	Free Home Demonstration	Eddy Arnold
4	The Gal Who Invented Kissin'	Hank Snow
6	Gambler's Guitar	Rusty Draper
2	Goin' Steady	Faron Young
8	Hey Joe	Kitty Wells
8	Hey, Mr. Cotton Picker	Tennessee Ernie Ford
7	(Honey, Baby, Hurry!) Bring Your Sweet Self Back to Me	Lefty Frizzell
9	Honeymoon on a Rocket Ship	Hank Snow
6	Hot Toddy	Red Foley
2	(How Much Is) That Hound Dog in the Window?	Homer and Jethro
4	How's the World Treating You	Eddy Arnold
5	I Can't Wait (For the Sun to Go Down)	Faron Young
5	I Couldn't Keep from Crying	Marty Robbins
10	I Found Out More Than You Ever Knew	Betty Cody
5	I Haven't Got the Heart	Webb Pierce
10	(I Just Had a Date) A Lover's Quarrel	George Morgan
4	I Won't Be Home No More	Hank Williams
4	I'll Go On Alone	Webb Pierce
3	I'm an Old, Old Man	Lefty Frizzell
2	Is Zat You, Myrtle	The Carlisles
7	Just Wait 'Til I Get You Alone	Carl Smith
3	Keep It a Secret	Slim Whitman
3	Knothole	The Carlisles
4	The Last Waltz	Webb Pierce
4	Mama, Come Get Your Baby Boy	Eddy Arnold
10	Marriage of Mexican Joe	Carolyn Bradshaw
9	No Help Wanted	Hank Thompson
7	No Help Wanted #2	Ernest Tubb
8	North Wind	Slim Whitman
3	Older and Bolder	Eddy Arnold
4	Orchids Mean Goodbye	Carl Smith
6	Paying for That Back Street Affair	Kitty Wells
7	Satisfaction Guaranteed	Carl Smith
7	Seven Lonely Days	Bonnie Lou
6	Shake a Hand	Red Foley
8	Slaves of a Hopeless Love Affair	Red Foley
3	Spanish Fire Ball	Hank Snow
6	Tennessee Wig Walk	Bonnie Lou
4	That's All Right	Autry Inman
4	That's Me Without You	Webb Pierce
9	That's Me Without You	Sonny James
9	That's the Kind of Love I'm Looking For	Carl Smith
7	Till I Waltz Again with You	Tommy Sosebee
4	Too Young to Tango	Sunrise Ruby
2	Trademark	Carl Smith
7	Weary Blues from Waitin'	Hank Williams
6	When Mexican Joe Met Jole Blon	Hank Snow
8	Yesterday's Girl	Hank Thompson

== Births ==
- April 9 — Hal Ketchum, popular country artist of the early 1990s. (d. 2020)
- June 1 — Ronnie Dunn, one half of Brooks & Dunn.
- July 9 - David Ball - Singer-Songwriter prominent in the mid-1990s & early 2000's (Thinking Problem), (Riding With Private Malone)
- July 14 - Mike Henderson, singer-songwriter and guitarist known for his work with Chris Stapleton and the SteelDrivers (d. 2023)
- October 8 - Ricky Lee Phelps - Former lead singer of The Kentucky Headhunters (Dumas Walker), (Walk Softly On This Heart Of Mine)
- November 4 – Van Stephenson, singer-songwriter and member of the 1990s group BlackHawk (d. 2001)

== Deaths ==
- January 1 — Hank Williams, 29, country music singing-songwriting giant and pioneer.
