= Abbott Records =

American 1950s record label

- Founded: 1951
- Founder: Fabor Robison
- Defunct: 1958
- Status: Defunct
- Genre: Country; rockabilly
- Country of origin: U.S.

Abbott Records was an American record label operated by music promoter and producer Fabor Robison from 1951 to about 1958. Abbott Records released mainly country and western music, rockabilly and — towards the end of its existence — mainstream pop vocal selections, enjoying considerable chart success for a label of its modest means.

== Early history ==
After serving a stint in the U.S. Army during World War II, Arkansas native Fabor Robison (b. 1911 — d. 1986) settled in Southern California and began to work as a talent scout. In late 1949 or early 1950, Robison discovered singer Johnny Horton, who had lately won a talent contest in Texas and had returned to his native Los Angeles, bought Western clothes, and was looking for a gig. Robison placed Horton on Cliffie Stone's Hometown Jamboree program, based out of Pasadena, California, which aired on KXLA on radio and KCOP (later KLAC) on television. Robison also set up a recording deal for Horton with the tiny Cormac Records label, but that concern soon folded. Disgusted, Robison decided to found his own record label and found an investor in pharmacist Sid Abbott; Robison subsequently named the label after his partner. At first, Abbott Records existed solely to record Horton, and the label's first ten releases were devoted to him, though some were duets with Billy Barton. None of the initial slate of releases attracted much in the way of attention, and in mid–1952 Robison sold Horton's recording contract to Mercury Records, a Chicago-based recording company which had a division in Shreveport, Louisiana.

== Louisiana Hayride ==
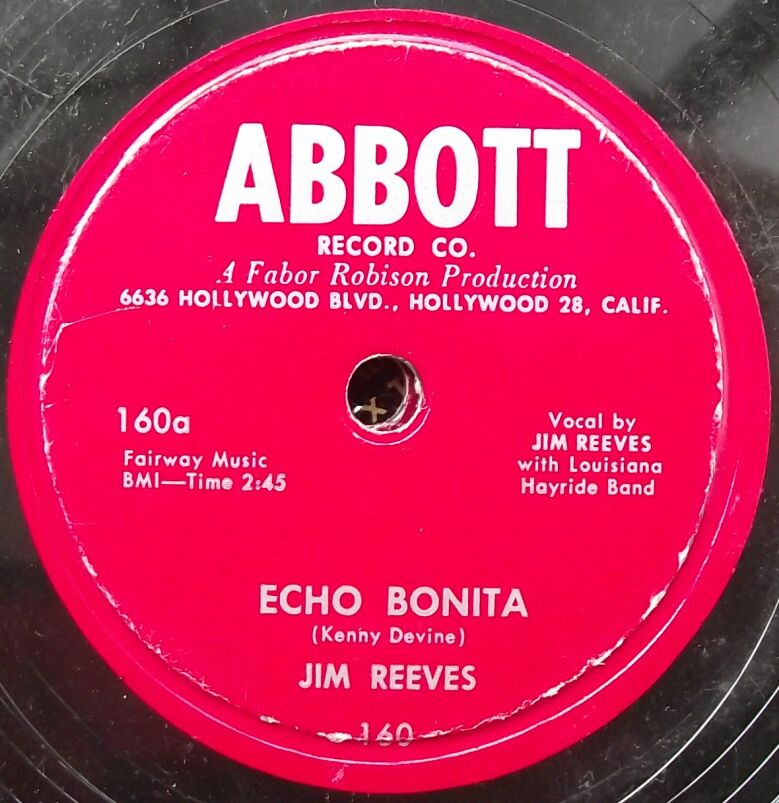
Jim Reeves on Abbott 160: "Echo Bonita"

Also in 1952, Johnny Horton joined the cast of Louisiana Hayride, based out of KWKH in Shreveport, an association Horton would enjoy the rest of his days. Likewise, Robison discovered the talent pool at the Louisiana Hayride and began to record their artist roster extensively. Robison took a special interest in singer Jim Reeves, to such extent that Johnny Horton became aggravated with Robison and dropped him as manager; Robison countered by representing Reeves instead. Reeves' records of "Mexican Joe" and "Bimbo" became the first chart hits on the Abbott Label.

== Subsidiaries and later years ==
In 1953, Abbott was doing well enough that Fabor Robison was able to buy out the share of his partner, Sid Abbott. In order to diversify the label's offerings, Robison founded the Fabor Records imprint as a subsidiary of Abbott, though at first these records carried the same artist pool—drawn from the Louisiana Hayride—as featured on the parent. These artists included pianist Floyd Cramer, the Browns, Smiley Burnette, Dorsey Burnette and Mitchell Torok, whose "Caribbean" was Abbott's next chart hit in 1953. Many of these recordings featured members of the Louisiana Hayride house band as accompanists and were recorded at KWKH studios in Shreveport. However, Robison also used the Sun Studio in Memphis on occasion, in addition to continuing to record in Los Angeles; in one instance he is known to have accepted a master submitted through the mail directly from an artist. Early Abbott issues bear an address in Malibu, and by the mid-1950s the label is listed as located in Hollywood, but the later Fabor Records releases revert to a Malibu address.

In 1955, Jim Reeves broke with Fabor Robison and signed with RCA Victor. The previous year, Robison had signed the DeCastro Sisters, whom to that point had largely functioned as the Cuban response to the Andrews Sisters. To facilitate the change of genre, Robison created a 3000 series within Abbott to cover popular, non-country music acts, and the DeCastros quickly delivered Abbott's biggest ever hit, "Teach Me Tonight," which went to Number Two on the Billboard pop charts. However, the incursion of rock n' roll into the music business was swiftly becoming unavoidable, and around 1958 Robison dropped both the Abbott and Fabor imprints and founded Radio Records, exclusively a rock n' roll label, with only Billy Barton held over from the previous Abbott and Fabor rosters. Radio was not a success and folded after just 25 releases in 1959.

Fabor Robison revived the Fabor imprint once more in 1962 to reissue Ned Miller's "From a Jack to a King" which had originally been recorded and released unsuccessfully in 1957. He kept this second Fabor label going until 1966; one of its last releases was a record by English actress Hermione Baddeley.

Robison's record companies were singles outfits; the only albums released by any of these companies were Jim Reeves Sings (Abbott 5001) and The DeCastro Sisters Sing (Abbott 5002) issued in 1955 and Jean Shepherd's spoken word album Into the Unknown with Jazz Music (Abbott 5003) issued in 1956.

== Legacy ==
Two years after the success of "From a Jack to a King", Robison sold Ned Miller's contract and all of his recordings to Capitol; he reached a similar agreement with RCA Victor in the wake of Jim Reeves' untimely death in 1964. Even when the Abbott family of labels was still a going concern, Robison was not above offering masters to other labels; an outtake of Mitchell Torok's 1953 recording of "Caribbean" became a hit again when it was released on the Guyden label in 1959. Robison had recorded much more material than he ever released, and there are large blocks of numbers in the Abbott catalogue that are apparently unused, slated for records that were planned, but never issued. Over the years to come, Robison would license Abbott and other material he had recorded to countless labels, many of them small and cheap, until he finally sold the vault to the Shelby Singleton Corporation sometime in the 1970s or 80s, but it is said that this sale contained some masters that had already been brokered to other labels.

Despite the confusion regarding the ultimate legacy of Abbott and its various subsidiaries as a legal entity, its artistic legacy is secure. Abbott was the first label to have several major artists before they became famous, such as Jim Reeves or Billie Jo Spears. Abbott also brought to recordings many lesser known figures of interest, such as Rudy Grayzell, Bonnie Guitar, Ginny Wright, Wink Lewis, Bob Stegall, and Bobby Hart. As such, more obscure titles—particularly rockabilly items—on Abbott and its sister labels have long remained popular with record collectors. Robison has not been fondly remembered by several of the artists who had business dealings with him.

Robison an unerring eye for talent, and it is with some irony that all of the talent that had worked with Robison established their best work and greatest successes after they had left for labels other than his.
