= Jim Reeves Sings =

Studio album by Jim Reeves
- Released: 1955
- Genre: Country
- Label: Abbott Record Co. – LP 5001

Jim Reeves chronology
Jim Reeves Sings (1955)	Singing Down the Lane (1956)

Professional ratings
Review scores
Source	Rating
AllMusic	4.5/5 stars
Billboard	positive
The Virgin Encyclopedia of Country Music	2/5 stars

Jim Reeves Sings is the debut studio album by Jim Reeves, released in 1955 by Abbott Record Co.

It was the singer's only album released by the Abbott record label.

Back in the days, Reeves sang in a loud "hillbilly" style typical of country and western singers of the era. When Reeves signed with RCA, his new label secured the rights to his "hillbilly-sounding" Abbott masters and, to the singer's displeasure, used them for his 1956 album Bimbo. The songs included on both Jim Reeves Sings and Bimbo are "Drinking Tequila", "Where Does a Broken Heart Go", "Mexican Joe", "Mother Went A-Walkin'", and "Penny Candy".

In 1982, RCA International released a Europe-only 2-LP compilation of the recordings Reeves' made for the Abbott label. The first volume, titled The Abbott Recordings Volume 1, was practically a repackage of Jim Reeves Sings with several additional tracks. It also had roughly the same cover and stated that its sleeve notes were "a facsimile of those carried on Jim's first and only album release on Abbott Records in 1954."

== History ==
By the time of the album's release, Jim Reeves had already signed with RCA Victor.

That was the first ever album issued by Abbott Record Co. It repackaged some of Reeves' hit recordings for the label, namely the "smash" "Mexican Joe" and smaller hits like "Drinking Tequila", "Penny Candy", and "The Wilder Your Heart Beats". Billboard magazine concluded in its review: "Should have a good sale now that the c.&w. market is gradually turning to 12-inch LP's."

== Track listing ==
Side 1

No.	Title	Length
1.	"I'll Follow You"
2.	"Where Does a Broken Heart Go"
3.	"Drinking Tequila"
4.	"Mexican Joe"
5.	"Give Me One More Kiss"
6.	"Mother Went A-Walkin'"

Side 2

No.	Title	Length
1.	"Penny Candy"
2.	"My Rambling Heart"
3.	"Red Eyed and Rowdy"
4.	"Beatin' on the Ding Dong"
5.	"The Wilder Your Heart Beats"
6.	"Are You the One"

=== The Abbott Recordings Volume 1 (RCA International, 1982) ===
Side 1

No.	Title	Length
7.	"Hillbilly Waltz"
8.	"Butterfly Love"
9.	"It's Hard to Love Just One"

Side 2

No.	Title	Length
7.	"El Rancho De Rio"
8.	"Bimbo"

- Also, in the 1982 repackage the sixth track on the first side is titled "Shall We Gather at the River (Mother Went A Walkin')", the second track of the second side – "Gypsy Heart", and the fifth track on the second side – "The Wilder Your Heart Beats the Sweeter You Love".
