= Bimbo (Jim Reeves album) =

Studio album by Jim Reeves
- Released: 1957
- Genre: Country
- Label: RCA Victor

Jim Reeves chronology
Singing Down the Lane (1956)	Bimbo (1957)	Jim Reeves (1957)

Bimbo is an album recorded by Jim Reeves and released on the RCA Victor label (catalog no. LPM-1410). Released in 1957, it was his first album after signing with RCA Victor. Reeves described it as a collection of the records that "made him", including his early No. 1 hits "Bimbo" and "Mexican Joe."

In Billboard magazine's annual poll of country and western disc jockeys, Bimbo was ranked No. 4 among the "Favorite C&W Albums" of 1957.

Anticipating Reeves' broad crossover appeal to pop listeners, critic Gwen Harrison of The Miami Herald wrote that the album appealed to country fans and had also won over listeners who were "not fond of the nasal-twang type of singing" that had been characteristic of the genre.

Syndicated country music critic Les Carroll called the album "a fine addition to a record library."

== Track listing ==
Side A

1. "Bimbo"
2. "How Many"
3. "Echo Bonita"
4. "Where Does A Broken Heart Go?"
5. "Penny Candy"
6. "Mother Went A-Walkin'"

Side B

1. "Mexican Joe"
2. "Then I'll Stop Lovin' You"
3. "Drinking Tequila"
4. "Gypsy Heart"
5. "What Were You Doing"
6. "Let Me Love You Just A Little"

== See also ==
- Jim Reeves discography
