= Helen Ward (singer) =

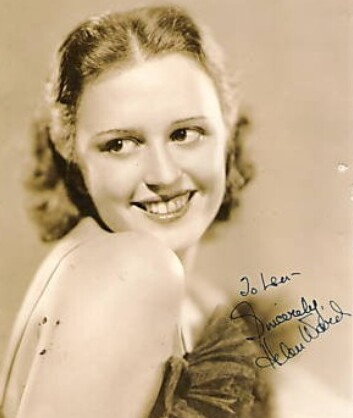

Background information
- Born: September 19, 1916; New York City, U.S.
- Died: April 21, 1998 (aged 81) Vencor Hospital, Arlington, Virginia, U.S.
- Genre: Jazz
- Occupation: Singer
- Years active: 1934–1960
- Spouses: Albert Marx (m. circa 1938, div. 1943); Daniel Murphy; Walter Newton (m. 1953); William Savory (m. 1971-1998; her death)

Helen Ward (September 19, 1916 – April 21, 1998) (public records state that her birth year was 1913) was an American jazz singer. She appeared on radio broadcasts with WOR and WNYC and worked as a staff musician at WNYC. She was most known for her hit cover of the Johnny Mercer song "Goody-Goody"

== Early years ==
Helen Ward was born on September 19, 1916 in New York City, the daughter of an Austrian father. Her grandfather immigrated from Austria to the United States in 1892. She came from a musical family and showed a true interest in music, taking piano lessons as a child.

== Career ==
While in high school, Ward started her singing career at the age of 17, first performing with Nye Mayhew's orchestra. She then began performing with various big band orchestras, such as the Freddy Martin orchestra, the Eddie Duchin orchestra, the Enric Madriguera and the Ed Loyd orchestra. Ward then joined the Benny Goodman orchestra in 1934, when she already had two years' professional singing experience. Goodman at first turned her down due to him being famously known for disliking vocalists in his orchestra, as he felt his music should be "instrumental only". He then allowed her to join his orchestra, realizing that in order for his band to gain commercial appeal and attention of the public, he needed vocalists for his songs. He reportedly chose Helen Ward as, according to him, "she was the only singer who could sing swing music properly". Her first record with Benny "I'm a Hundred Percent for You" turned out to be a huge success and is considered to be the breakthrough record for both her and Goodman, moving them both into the limelight. Impresario Billy Rose heard her audition for Goodman and booked Goodman and Ward for the Let's Dance radio program. During her time with Goodman, Ward's most memorable songs included "Hooray For Love", "The Dixieland Band", "You’re a Heavenly Thing," "Between the Devil and the Deep Blue Sea", "It’s Been So Long", “These Foolish Things", and "You Turned the Tables on Me", as well as her hit cover of Johnny Mercer's "Goody-Goody" for which she is most remembered. Her first singing session with Goodman's orchestra lasted until 1937.

During her time recording for the Benny Goodman orchestra, Ward moonlighted with other bands including the Teddy Wilson orchestra in 1936 and Larry Kent and his Orchestra in November of that same year (under the name "Vera Lane"). As well, during this time, Ward married her first husband, Albert Marx, who in 1938 arranged for Goodman's Carnegie Hall concert to be recorded for her as a souvenir. That recording was released as a dual LP set by Columbia Records in 1950 under the title The Famous 1938 Carnegie Hall Jazz Concert. The marriage to Albert Marx effectively ended her partnership with the Benny Goodman Orchestra, with Benny becoming enraged when Ward told him that she was leaving his band to marry Albert. Shortly after she left Goodman's band, Ward recorded with Gene Krupa and his orchestra later that year. In 1939, she recorded with the Bob Crosby orchestra and appeared on Crosby's Camel Caravan radio program. In 1940, Ward recorded for the Joe Sullivan orchestra.

Ward worked with the bands of Matty Malneck and Harry James in 1941 as well as Hal McIntyre (from February to October 1943). She became a radio show producer for WMGM in 1946–1947 and appeared on Goodman's radio show in July 1946. She then briefly went into retirement, only performing sporadically until she reunited with Benny Goodman in the 1950s, going on several band tours across the country. In 1952, she recorded an album of Dixieland tunes with "Wild" Bill Davison and also made several appearances with Larry Clinton and Peanuts Hucko in 1956. She stopped performing for a second time in 1960. She then made a brief return in the late 1970s and early 1980s, returning to singing at New York City clubs in 1979. In 1981, she released her final album, The Helen Ward Song Book Vol. I.

== Personal life ==
After her marriage to Marx ended in divorce in 1943, Ward married three more times, first to Daniel Murphy then to Walter Newton in 1953. In 1971, Ward married audio engineer William Savory, with the marriage lasting until her death in 1998. Savory was part of the team that invented the LP. She eventually stopped performing altogether and spent her later years in Falls Church, Virginia.

== Death ==
Ward died of heart ailments at Vencor Hospital in Arlington, Virginia at the age of 82.

== Discography ==
=== As leader ===
- It's Been So Long (Columbia, 1953)
- The Complete Helen Ward on Columbia (Collector's Choice, 2000)

=== As guest ===
- Larry Clinton, Larry Clinton in Hi Fi (RCA Victor, 1957)
- Benny Goodman, Fletcher Henderson Arrangements (Columbia, 1953)
- Benny Goodman, The Golden Age of Swing (RCA Victor, 1956)
- Peanuts Hucko, With a Little Bit of Swing (RCA Victor, 1958)
- Harry James, The Uncollected Harry James and His Orchestra 1943–1946 Vol. 2 (Hindsight, 1978)
