= Singing Down the Lane =

1956 studio album by Jim Reeves

Studio album by Jim Reeves
- Released: 1956
- Genre: Country
- Label: RCA Victor

Jim Reeves chronology
Jim Reeves Sings (1955)	Singing Down the Lane (1956)	Bimbo (1957)

Singing Down the Lane is an album recorded by country music singer Jim Reeves. Released in June 1956, it was his first album for RCA Victor. Eight of the tracks were also issued as a double 7" 45 rpm EP set.

== History ==
In November 1957, Billboard magazine reported on its annual poll of country music disc jockeys. Singing Down the Lane ranked No. 10 among the "Favorite C&W Albums" of the preceding year.

The liner notes on the album's back cover summed up the album: "There are no slow, strained moments in the long-playing tracks of this album. The title of the album was the keynote . . and the barometer was reading 'Spring' . . . and the handsome fellow from Texas was striding down the lane with an even dozen of his best vocals."

Reeves' biographer Larry Jordan criticized the record company for the album's weak packaging—a black-and-white photograph of Reeves that had been "tinted a garish green" and that showed him "wearing a toupee that looked like some sort of an animal ready to leap off his head." Jordan also criticized Reeves' "full bore" and unrestrained delivery on several tracks, lacking the subtlety and mellowness that marked his later RCA Victor recordings.

The Juke Box Rebel ranked it No. 13 among the albums released in 1956.

== Track listing ==
Side A

1. "Roly Poly"
2. "Have I Told You Lately That I Love You?"
3. "Breeze (Blow My Baby Back to Me)"
4. "Waltzing on Top of the World"
5. "Oklahoma Hills" (Guthrie)
6. "Love Me a Little Bit More"

Side B

1. "Tweedle O'Twill"
2. "Each Time You Leave"
3. "Ichabod Crane"
4. "Your Old Love Letters"
5. "Beyond the Shadow of a Doubt"
6. "Highway to Nowhere"
