= Norman Gimbel =

American lyricist (1927–2018)

- Born: November 16, 1927; New York City, U.S.
- Died: December 19, 2018 (aged 91); Montecito, California, U.S.
- Education: Baruch College, Columbia University
- Occupations: Lyricist, songwriter
- Spouses: Elinor Rowley (divorced); Victoria Carver (divorced)
- Children: 4
- Awards: Academy Award for Best Original Song (1980)

Norman Gimbel (November 16, 1927 – December 19, 2018) was an American lyricist and songwriter of popular songs and themes to television shows and films. He wrote the lyrics for songs including "Ready to Take a Chance Again" (with composer Charles Fox) and "Canadian Sunset". He also co-wrote "Killing Me Softly with His Song". He wrote English-language lyrics for many international hits, including "Sway", "Summer Samba", "The Girl from Ipanema", "How Insensitive", "Drinking-Water", "Meditation", "I Will Wait for You" and "Watch What Happens". Of the movie themes he co-wrote, five were nominated for Academy Awards or Golden Globe Awards or both, including "It Goes Like It Goes", from the film Norma Rae, which won the Academy Award for Best Original Song for 1979. Gimbel was inducted into the Songwriters Hall of Fame in 1984.

== Background ==
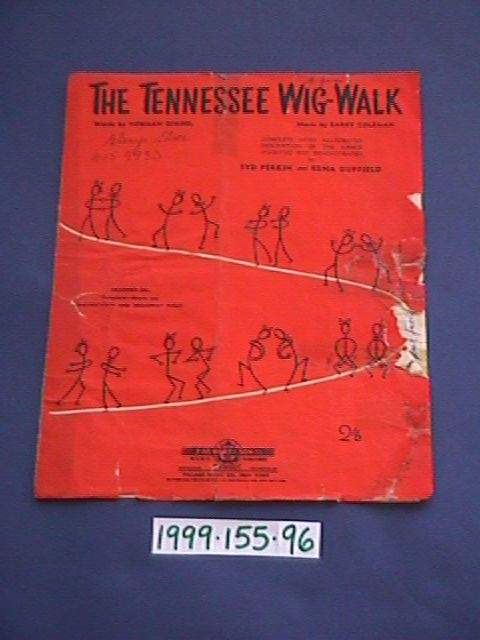
The Tennessee Wig-Walk sheet music cover, published by Francis, Day & Hunter Ltd. in 1953

Gimbel was born on November 16, 1927, in Brooklyn, New York City, the son of Lottie (Nass) and businessman Morris Gimbel. His parents were Jewish immigrants from Austria. He studied English at Baruch College and Columbia University.

== Career ==
=== Early successes ===
Gimbel was self-taught in music and following initial employment with music publisher David Blum, progressed to become a contract songwriter with Edwin H. Morris Music. He wrote the lyrics for the song "Tennessee Wig Walk", a.k.a. "The Tennessee Wig-Walk", composed by Larry Coleman and recorded by Bonnie Lou in 1953. Small successes and moderate fame came as a result of lively novelty songs "Ricochet", which was popularized in a 1953 recording by Teresa Brewer from which was developed the 1954 Judy Canova film Ricochet Romance, and "A Whale of a Tale", sung by Kirk Douglas in another 1954 production, Disney's 20,000 Leagues Under the Sea. Greater success was earned with Dean Martin's recording of "Sway", for which Gimbel wrote English lyrics for the song, which was originally in Spanish. It reached #6 on the UK singles chart, followed by his first big success, Andy Williams' rendition of "Canadian Sunset", which scored a #1 in 1956.

=== Two Broadway musicals ===
Top songwriter Frank Loesser became Gimbel's mentor and, through Loesser, he met composer Moose Charlap with whom he wrote the first of his numerous songs to appear in films, "Past the Age of Innocence", from the 1951 Monogram musical, Rhythm Inn.

At the end of the decade, he collaborated with Charlap on the only Broadway musicals for which he wrote lyrics, Whoop-Up and The Conquering Hero. Whoop-Up opened at the Shubert Theatre on December 22, 1958, and, despite some encouraging reviews, ended after a disappointing 56 performances on February 7, 1959.

The opening night of Conquering Hero was almost two years later, on January 16, 1961. Ultimately, Hero fared even worse than Whoop-Up, closing on January 21, after only 7 performances.

=== English lyrics for foreign songs ===
In 1963, Gimbel was introduced by music publisher Lou Levy to a group of young Brazilian bossa nova composers, including Antônio Carlos Jobim, Luiz Bonfá and Baden Powell, for whose works he started writing English-language lyrics, the kind of work he had previously done for "Sway". Most notably, he created the lyrics for Marcos Valle's "Summer Samba," also known as "So Nice", as well as Jobim's "How Insensitive", "The Girl from Ipanema" (turning it into a top hit for Astrud Gilberto) and "Meditation", which has gained the status of a "classic" in the jazz and bossa nova genres. He also provided the lyrics for French composers Michel Legrand (two themes from The Umbrellas of Cherbourg—"Watch What Happens" and the Oscar-nominated "I Will Wait for You"), Eddy Marnay and Emil Stern ("Amazing") and singer-composer Gilbert Bécaud ("You'll See" and other songs). He also provided the lyrics for Belgian jazz harmonica player Toots Thielemans ("Bluesette")."Only Love" sung by Nana Mouskouri – No 2 United Kingdom (performed in a Command Performance for the Queen Mother).

=== Career as a lyricist of film songs and TV themes ===
In October 1968, Norman Gimbel moved to Los Angeles, where he became active in film and television. Among the Hollywood composers with whom he worked were Elmer Bernstein, Bill Conti, Jack Elliott, Charles Fox, Dave Grusin, Maurice Jarre, Quincy Jones, Fred Karlin, Francis Lai, Peter Matz, Lalo Schifrin, David Shire and Patrick Williams.

In 1971, Gimbel and Fox signed 19-year-old singer-songwriter Lori Lieberman to a management contract, taking 20% of her income—double the usual amount. Aged 44 years, Gimbel began an extra-marital affair with Lieberman which would last several years. Gimbel said that he relied on Lieberman to inspire his songwriting creativity since he had passed the most creative days of his youth: "Now I need a reason to write, and Lori is one of the best reasons a lyricwriter could have." Lieberman was inspired by a performance of Don McLean to write some lyrics for a song; she shared these with Gimbel who fleshed out the lyrics while Fox wrote the music. Lieberman, Gimbel and Fox collaborated on the song's title, adapted from Gimbel's notebook of ideas. The song became "Killing Me Softly with His Song", which Lieberman recorded in 1972 in the folk style. Gimbel and Fox produced the song and took full writing credit, cutting Lieberman out of future profits. Roberta Flack heard this version and remade the song in her own style in 1973, making it a hit. This version was very profitable for Gimbel, winning him his second Grammy Award for Song of the Year.

Also in 1973, the Gimbel and Fox song "I Got a Name", recorded by Jim Croce and used in the 1973 film The Last American Hero, was voted Best Film Song by the Young New York Film Critics. In 1979, Gimbel had his only Emmy Awards nomination for Outstanding Music Composition for a Series for The Paper Chase, which he again shared with Fox. Los Angeles theater work with Fox included a rock/pop version of A Midsummer Night's Dream for the city's Shakespeare Festival, seen at the Ford Amphitheatre, and The Eleventh, which played the Sunset Theater. The year 1980 was a banner year at the Oscars for Norman Gimbel with a win for Best Original Song, ("It Goes Like It Goes"), written with David Shire for the film Norma Rae.

Continuing his working relationship with Charles Fox, Gimbel wrote lyrics for the theme songs of many TV series, including The Bugaloos, Happy Days, Laverne & Shirley, Angie, Wonder Woman, the Emmy-winning theme for The Paper Chase, and the song score for Pufnstuf, the 1970 film version of the 1969–71 Saturday-morning children's series H.R. Pufnstuf.

In 1984, Gimbel was inducted into the Songwriters Hall of Fame, and continued to be active in film into 2009. He wrote all the songs, including "A World Without Fences", for Disney's 2001 direct-to-video animated feature Lady and the Tramp II: Scamp's Adventure, receiving a nomination for the Video Premiere Award, in addition to having provided song scores for The Phantom Tollbooth (1969), Where's Poppa? (1970), A Troll in Central Park (1994) and The Thief and the Cobbler (a/k/a Arabian Knight) (1995 U.S. version). Over the years, his songs were used in over ninety films, with some of the most popular titles, such as "The Girl from Ipanema", heard in 1997's Deconstructing Harry, 2002's Catch Me If You Can, 2005's V for Vendetta and Mr. & Mrs. Smith and 2007's The Invasion, and "Sway" heard in 2004's Shall We Dance? and 2046, 2006's Bella, 2007's No Reservations and 2008's Paris. Additional films which used his songs include 1980's Cloud Dancer (with composer Fred Karlin), 1984's Johnny Dangerously (with composer John Morris), 2006's Invincible ("I Got a Name") and Click ("So Nice") and the 2007 French film Roman de Gare, which featured his English-language lyrics to Gilbert Bécaud's "You'll See".

=== Recognition ===
Gimbel received four Golden Globes nominations, the first of which was for the song "Circles in the Water," with music by Francis Lai), written for the American distribution of the 1967 French film Live for Life, while the second honored "Stay" (with composer Ernest Gold), heard in the 1969 film The Secret of Santa Vittoria. The other two were for the songs "Richard's Window," from 1975's The Other Side of the Mountain, and "Ready to Take a Chance Again", used in 1978's Foul Play. Both songs, whose lyrics Gimbel wrote to music that had been composed by Charles Fox, his most frequent collaborator, were also nominated for Oscars.

He had been a member of the Academy of Motion Picture Arts And Sciences since 1970.

== Personal life and death ==
Norman Gimbel was married twice, to model Elinor Rowley and then to lawyer Victoria Carver; both marriages ended in divorce. He had four children. Gimbel died on December 19, 2018, at his home in Montecito, California, aged 91.
