= Jim Reeves (album) =

Studio album by Jim Reeves
- Released: 1957
- Genre: Country
- Label: RCA Victor

Jim Reeves chronology
Bimbo (1957)	Jim Reeves (1957)	Girls I Have Known (1958)

Jim Reeves is an album recorded by Jim Reeves and released in 1957 on the RCA Victor label (catalog no. LPM-1576). The album was RCA's initial effort to market Reeves to a "pop" oriented market.

== Track listing ==
Side A

1. "Teardrops in My Heart" (Horton)
2. "I Get the Blues When It Rains" (Stoddard, Klauber)
3. "You Belong to Me" (Price, King, Stewart)
4. "Everywhere You Go" (Goodwin, Shay, Fisher)
5. "Need Me" (Reeves)
6. "I Care No More" (Ashlock)

Side B

1. "My Happiness" (Peterson, Bergantine)
2. "Yours" (Roig, Sherr)
3. "That's My Desire" (Loveday, Kresa)
4. "Blues in My Heart" (Carson, Foley)
5. "I Don't See Me in Your Eyes Anymore" (Benjamin, Weiss)
6. "Final Affair" (Reeves)

== See also ==
- Jim Reeves discography
