= Wakefield, Kentucky =

Unincorporated community in Kentucky, United States

- Unincorporated community
- Interactive map of Wakefield, Kentucky
- Coordinates: 37°58′19″N 85°18′29″W
- Country: United States
- State: Kentucky
- County: Spencer
- Elevation: 722 ft (220 m)
- Time zone: UTC-5 (Eastern (EST))
  - Summer (DST): UTC-4 (EDT)
- Area code: 502

Wakefield is an unincorporated community in Spencer County, Kentucky, United States. Wakefield lies on Kentucky Route 55 midway between Taylorsville and Bloomfield.

Wakefield was named after Wakefield Farm, a nineteenth-century homestead. William Clarke Quantrill, a Confederate raid leader, was ambushed and killed by Union troops at Wakefield Farm in May 1865.

Country musician Bill Carlisle was born at Wakefield in 1908.
