= Bimbo (song) =

1940s song written by Glenn O'Dell

Single by Jim Reeves

from the album Up Through the Years
- B-side: "Gypsy Heart"
- Released: October 1953
- Recorded: 1953
- Genre: Country
- Length: 2:45
- Label: Abbott
- Songwriter: Glenn O'Dell

Jim Reeves singles chronology
"Butterfly Love" (1953)	"Bimbo" (1953)	"I Love You" (1954)

Official audio
- "Bimbo" on YouTube

"Bimbo" is a popular song written in either 1948 or 1949 by Glenn O'Dell, but credited to Rodney (Rod) Morris or "Pee Wee" King. It was recorded in 1953 by Jim Reeves on Abbott 148. The song was later included in the 1965 album Up Through the Years on RCA Victor. Reeves' version became his second number-one song on the Billboard country chart in January 1954, and helped pave the way to his eventual superstardom. Like his previous number-one hit "Mexican Joe", "Bimbo" was more of a novelty hit for Reeves; as such, "Bimbo" differed greatly from the smooth, Nashville sound ballads – "Four Walls" and "He'll Have to Go" – that he later recorded and made famous. Former NBA player Vernell "Bimbo" Coles is nicknamed after this song.

== Cover versions ==
- The song was recorded by Gene Autry and originally released as a 78 rpm single in 1954. It can also be found on the 1998 album, Always Your Pal, Gene Autry. This is an album of singalong cowboy music for children.
- A version sung by Suzi Miller was played on the BBC radio station's Children's Favourites show during the 1950s or 1960s.
- Ruby Wright's version of "Bimbo" made number seven on the UK Singles Chart in April 1954.
- A Norwegian version was released in 1969 by Rolf Just-Nilsen with the title "Bingo" on the single Triola TN 579. Henry Ruud wrote the Norwegian lyrics.
- The song was used as the theme tune to the Liverpool comedian John Bishop's radio show on Radio City Talk.
