= Rudy Grayzell =

American musician (1933–2019)

Rudy "Tutti" Grayzell (June 8, 1933 - November 26, 2019), also known as Rudy Gray, was a Rockabilly musician.

He was born Rudolph Paiz Jimenez in Saspamco, Texas, and took his stage-name from his German great-grandmother. He first formed "The Buckles", which became "Texas Kool Kats" and a popular local group. He also had a daily radio show in 1957. These groups were country-oriented, but he moved toward a more rockabilly sound with "Let's Get Wild" or "Duck Tail." In the 1950s he toured with Elvis Presley, who came up with his nickname, suggesting he should have recorded ”Tutti Frutti”. He is an inductee of the Rockabilly Hall of Fame.

His chief mainstream contribution has been as "celebrity spokesman" for Pine Brothers Softish Throat Drops, sporting a pompadour wig, jewelry and a pasted-on thatch of chest hair.
