= Rub-A-Dub-Dub (Hank Thompson song) =

Single by Hank Thompson

from the album Songs of the Brazos Valley
- B-side: "I'll Sign My Heart Away"
- Released: 1953
- Recorded: 1953
- Genre: Country
- Length: 2:16
- Label: Capitol
- Songwriters: Hank Thompson, Billy Gray

Hank Thompson singles chronology
"No Help Wanted" (1953)	"Rub-A-Dub-Dub" (1953)	"Yesterday's Girl" (1953)

"Rub-A-Dub-Dub" is a country music song written by Hank Thompson, performed by Thompson and his Brazos Valley Boys and released on the Capitol label (catalog no. 2445). It is based on the 18th century nursery rhyme, "Rub-a-dub-dub". It was Thompson's second hit record based on a nursery rhyme, following his 1948 recording of "Humpty Dumpty Heart".

It debuted on Billboard magazine's country and western chart on May 23, 1953, spent three weeks at the No. 3 spot based on juke box plays (No. 2 based on disc jockey plays, No. 5 based on sales), and remained on the chart for 20 weeks. It was also ranked as the No. 5 record on Billboard's 1953 year-end country chart based on juke box plays (No. 13 based on retail sales).

== See also ==
- Billboard Top Country & Western Records of 1953
