= Tennessee Wig Walk =

1953 song by Larry Coleman

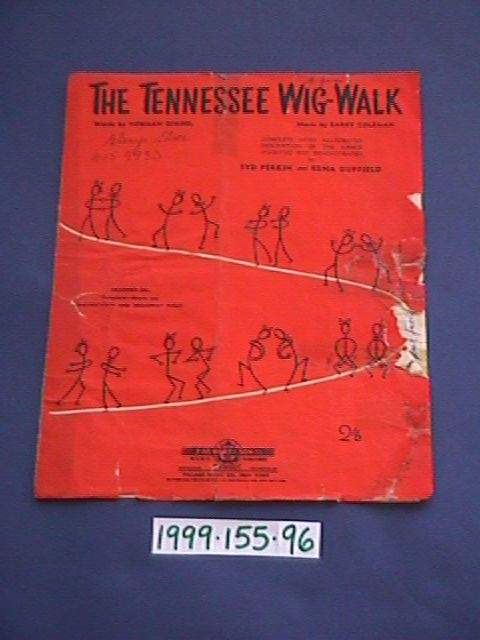
- Cover of sheet music, published by Francis, Day & Hunter Ltd.

Single by Bonnie Lou

from the album Bonnie Lou: Doin' the Tennessee Wig Walk
- B-side: "Scrap of Paper"
- Released: September 1953
- Recorded: 1953
- Genre: Country music
- Length: 2:05
- Label: Parlophone
- Composer: Larry Coleman
- Lyricist: Norman Gimbel

Bonnie Lou singles chronology
"Seven Lonely Days" (1953)	"Tennessee Wig Walk" (1953)	"Daddy-O" (1955)

"Tennessee Wig Walk" (also "The Tennessee Wig-Walk") is a popular song by the American composer Larry Coleman, with lyrics by Norman Gimbel.

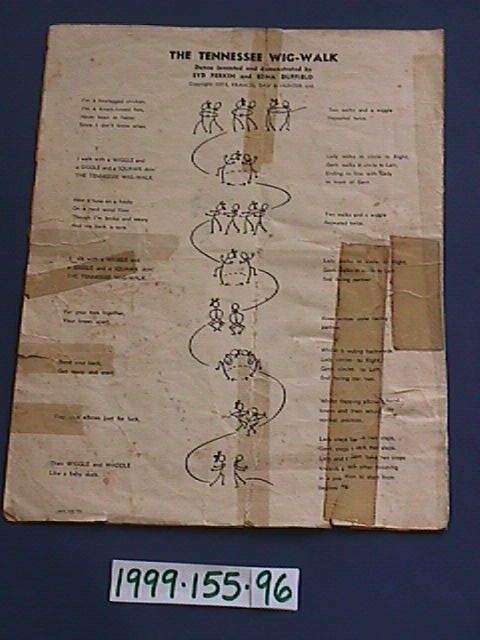
The Tennessee Wig-Walk sheet music

The sheet cover was published by Francis, Day & Hunter Ltd. in 1953. The lyrics include the refrain "Doin' the Tennessee wig walk" and the song was used as dance music.

The song was recorded by Bonnie Lou in 1953 under the Parlaphone record label. The recording was in The Billboard Top Country & Western Records US National Best Sellers top ten list during 1953, reaching number 6. In the same year, it was released as a single on the Decca label by the American big band Russ Morgan And His Orchestra "Music In The Morgan Manner"* as "The Tennessee Wig-Walk".

Later, Lena Zavaroni included the song on her second album (If My Friends Could See Me Now, 1974) and third album (Lena Zavaroni in South Africa, 1975). The song was re-released on a CD compilation album of Bonnie Lou songs entitled "Doin' The Tennessee Wig Walk: The Best Of The King Years" in 2000 on the Westside label.

== See also ==
- 1953 in country music
