= I Let the Stars Get in My Eyes =

"I Let the Stars Get In My Eyes"

Single by Goldie Hill
- A-side: "I Let the Stars Get In My Eyes"
- B-side: "Waiting For a Letter"
- Released: December 1952
- Recorded: 1952
- Genre: Country
- Length: 2:35
- Label: Decca Records
- Songwriters: Tommy Hill, Slim Willet

Goldie Hill singles chronology
"Why Talk to My Heart" (1952)	"I Let the Stars Get In My Eyes" (1952)	"I'm Yvonne (On the Bayou)" (1953)

"I Let the Stars Get In My Eyes" is country music song that was written by Slim Willet and Tommy Hill. The song was an answer song to the big pop music hit Perry Como had with Willet's song "Don't Let the Stars Get In Your Eyes."

== Background ==
Slim Willet and Skeets McDonald also recorded country versions of the pop song that became hits. When Hill and Willet wrote the answer song, it was originally intended for Kitty Wells who like Goldie Hill was a star of the Louisiana Hayride. In 1952, Hill was trying to make it as a country artist after signing a contract with Decca Records that year. Her first single, 1952's "Why Talk to My Heart," was not successful. She would have a major hit, however, with this song written by singer Slim Willet and Hill's brother, Tommy.

== Chart performance ==
The song was then released by Decca Records It went to number one on Billboard magazine's Most Played in Jukeboxes chart, and number four on the National Best Sellers chart on Billboard's country charts. Her recording made Hill only the second woman to have accomplished, one year after Kitty Wells became the first with It Wasn't God Who Made Honky Tonk Angels.

Along with Kitty Wells, Hill's success inspired other female country singers to try to make into the music business. Some of these singers later did, like Jean Shepard in 1953 and Patsy Cline in 1957.
