= It's Been So Long =

Single by Webb Pierce
- B-side: "Don't Throw Your Life Away"
- Released: 1953
- Recorded: 1953
- Genre: Country
- Length: 2:33
- Label: Decca
- Songwriter(s): Autry Grisham

Webb Pierce singles chronology
| "I Haven't Got the Heart" (1953) | "It's Been So Long" (1953) | "Don't Throw Your Life Away" (1953) |

"It's Been So Long" is a 1953 single written by Autry Grisham and performed by Webb Pierce. The single was Pierce's fourth number one on the country charts, topping all three country music charts then under publication of Billboard

== Content ==
Jeffrey J. Lange, in the book Smile when You Call Me a Hillbilly: Country Music's Struggle for Respectability, 1939-1954, describes the song as an example of Pierce's lyrical focus on "failed relationships" contrasted with "up-tempo musical background". The editors of The Encyclopedia of Country Music stated that the song was integral in Pierce's success with honky-tonk material following the death of Hank Williams.

== Critical reception ==
An uncredited review in Billboard called the song "another potentially winning effort by the singer with the stylized pipes." Another review in the same publication stated that the song "is perfectly suited to the 'high' singing style with which Pierce has done so well." Similarly, an uncredited article in The Kansas City Star made note of Pierce's "high" singing voice and stated that the song "insures his continued popularity."

== Chart performance ==
At the time of the song's release, Billboard ran three separate music charts encompassing country music: Juke Box Folk Records, Best Selling Retail Folk Records, and Country & Western Records Most Played by Folk Disc Jockeys. "It's Been So Long" achieved the number one position on all three, with an eight-week tenure on Most Played by Folk Disc Jockeys, six weeks on Best Selling Retail Folk Records, and one on Juke Box Folk Records. The song's B-side, "Don't Throw Your Life Away", also peaked at number nine on the latter chart.

Chart performance for "It's Been So Long"
| Chart (1953) | Peak position |
|---|---|
| US Billboard Country & Western Records Most Played By Folk Disk Jockeys | 1 |
| US Billboard Best Selling Retail Folk Records | 1 |
| US Billboard Juke Box Folk Records | 1 |
