= Seven Lonely Days =

1953 single by Georgia Gibbs

Single by Georgia Gibbs
- B-side: "If You Took My Heart Away"
- Released: February 1953
- Label: Mercury
- Songwriters: Earl Shuman, Alden Shuman, Marshall Brown

Georgia Gibbs singles chronology
| "My Favorite Song" (1952) | "Seven Lonely Days" (1953) | "For Me, For Me" (1953) |

"Seven Lonely Days" is a song written by Earl Shuman, Alden Shuman, and Marshall Brown. It was originally recorded by American singer Georgia Gibbs with orchestra conducted by Glenn Osser and the Yale Bros. choir in December 1952 and released in February 1953, peaking at number 5 in the US chart.

The song was later performed by The Pinetoppers And The Marlin Sisters, Bonnie Lou, The Crows with Viola Watkins, Gisele MacKenzie, Ivo Robić, Kitty Wells, The Teddy Bears, Patsy Cline, The Migil 5, Wanda Jackson, Dave Dudley, Dan Folger, Jean Shepard, Owen Gray, Lynn Anderson, Debbie, Fred Stuger, Sheila & B.Devotion, Mario Cavallero et son orchestre (with Karine Miet), Kristi Rose and the Midnight Walkers, k d lang, Kelly Willis, Petty Booka, Kirsten Siggaard, Smoking Popes, The Ranch Girls & Their Ragtime Wranglers, Wenche Hartmann, Cowslingers, and Marti Brom. The melody is the basis for the popular 1954 Mandarin Shidaiqu song "Give Me a Kiss" (給我一個吻) by Zhang Lu, and a 1965 Cantonese pop song "Typhoon Signal No. 10" (十號風波) by Tang Kee-chan and Lee Wai (李慧).

== Original chart performance ==
| Chart (1953) | Peak position |
|---|---|
| U.S. Billboard Hot 100 | 5 |

== Bonnie Lou version ==
"Seven Lonely Days"

Single by Bonnie Lou

from the album Bonnie Lou Sings
- B-side: "Just Out of Reach"
- Released: March 1953
- Genre: Country
- Label: King
- Songwriters: Earl Shuman, Alden Shuman, Marshall Brown

Bonnie Lou singles chronology
| "Tennessee Wig Walk" (1953) | "Seven Lonely Days" (1953) | "Scrap of Paper" (1953) |

Country music and rock and roll singer Bonnie Lou released the song as a single in March 1953. It peaked at number 7 on the Billboard Magazine Most Played C&W in Juke Boxes chart and was later included on her 1958 album, Bonnie Lou Sings.

=== Chart performance ===
| Chart (1953) | Peak position |
|---|---|
| U.S. Billboard Hot C&W in Juke Boxes | 7 |

== Gisele MacKenzie version ==
"Seven Lonely Days"

Single by Gisele MacKenzie
- A-side: "Till I Waltz Again With You"
- Released: July 1953
- Label: Capitol
- Songwriters: Earl Shuman, Alden Shuman, Marshall Brown

Canadian singer Gisele MacKenzie performed her own version of Seven Lonely Days in July 1953. It reached the sixth place in the UK Singles Chart.

=== Chart performance ===
| Chart (1953) | Peak position |
|---|---|
| UK Singles Chart | 6 |

== Jean Shepard version ==
"Seven Lonely Days"

Single by Jean Shepard

from the album Seven Lonely Days
- B-side: "Invisible Tears"
- Released: August 1969
- Genre: Country
- Label: Capitol

Jean Shepard singles chronology
| "I'm Tied Around Your Finger" (1969) | "Seven Lonely Days" (1969) | "Then He Touched Me" (1969) |

In 1969, Jean Shepard released a version from her album Seven Lonely Days. It was her first single to become a major hit since 1967's "Your Forevers (Don't Last Very Long)". Shepard's versions reached number 18 on the Billboard Magazine Hot Country Singles chart and number 34 on the RPM Country Singles chart.

=== Chart performance ===
| Chart (1969) | Peak position |
|---|---|
| U.S. Billboard Hot Country Singles | 18 |
| Canadian RPM Country Singles | 34 |
