= Mitchell Torok =

American country singer-songwriter (1929–2017)

- Born: Mitchell Joseph Torok; October 28, 1929; Houston, Texas, U.S.
- Died: November 16, 2017 (aged 88) Alvin, Texas, U.S.
- Genre: Country
- Occupations: Singer, songwriter

Mitchell Joseph Torok (October 28, 1929 – November 16, 2017) was an American country music singer-songwriter, guitarist, artist and author, best known for his 1953 hit record "Caribbean". He also wrote "Mexican Joe", which catapulted Jim Reeves to stardom. They began to write together and charted with many top 20 hits.

Torok reached the Billboard charts several times: in 1957 with "Pledge of Love" (Billboard Top 20), written by his wife, Gail Redd; in 1959 with an updated version of "Caribbean" (No. 27 on Billboard); with "Redneck Nat' Anthem" by Vernon Oxford in 1976; with Jerry Wallace and their song "This One's on the House" (Top 20); and with Bill Phillips's "I Can Stand It (As Long as She Can)". In 1960, Torok's recording of "Pink Chiffon" topped out at No. 60 on Billboard. His last hit record was "Instant Love" in 1965, produced by Jimmie Bowen.

== Early life and education ==
Mitchell Joseph Torok was born in Houston, Texas on October 28, 1929, to Hungarian immigrants. He was named Mitchell after the doctor who delivered him. He was playing guitar by the age of 12, but unlike most country singers of his era he did not grow up with country music at a young age.

Torok attended Stephen F. Austin State University in Nacogdoches, Texas from 1948 to 1953, on a football and baseball scholarship. Torok majored in art and minored in world history, and played baseball in Garrison, Texas whilst studying.

== Early career and chart success ==
Torok recorded his first session in Houston with a duet partner named Sally Lee. These masters later wound up on Imperial Records. During the next two years, he performed his own morning radio show on KSFA and KFRD, in Rosenberg and KTRE in Lufkin. The owner of KFRD heard him and suggested that he record some songs. He recorded "Nacogdoches County Line" with the FBC label for his first single. He also recorded "Piney Woods Boogie".

One of Torok's idols, Hank Williams, died suddenly on January 1, 1953. Inspired by a need for some happy songs, he immediately penned a happy-go-lucky song titled "Mexican Joe," which he wrote in thirty minutes based on "Polly Wolly Doodle", initially intending the song for another one of his idols, Hank Snow.

But a new record producer and label owner from Hollywood, Fabor Robison, happened by Nacogdoches and found Torok and the song. Torok wanted one of Robison's supposed heavy West Coast artist to record his song. He reluctantly gave it to him and his Abbott record label, to be recorded by one of his own struggling artists, the then unknown Jim Reeves, in Shreveport. (Torok, feeling the chances of Reeves' record hitting were small or nonexistent, planned to use the Jim Reeves record as a "demo" to send to Hank Snow.) Reeves had been hired to be an announcer on KWKH and the Hayride Show, but not allowed to sing. Torok's song, "Mexican Joe", was recorded by Reeves and it became a number one hit, and spent seven weeks riding the top of the Billboard Country Music Charts. Torok was then signed to Abbott Records.

A month later he wrote "Caribbean", which he recorded. The song became popular in both the Billboard Country and Jukebox charts, and remained at the top for four weeks. It stayed on the country chart for 24 weeks, also a top five hit on both the Best Sellers and Disc Jockey charts, as well as being a No. 13 hit in Australia.

Torok became a member of Louisiana Hayride on KWKH-AM in Shreveport. In 1954, his song "My Arabian Baby" appeared as the B-side of Snow's hit "I Don't Hurt Anymore". Torok gained a No. 8 country hit with "Hootchy Kootchy Henry (From Hawaii)" and in 1956, after joining Decca Records in Nashville, he had top ten success on the UK Singles Chart with his and Gail's song, "When Mexico Gave Up The Rhumba" and "Red Light, Green Light".

This success led to a four-month tour of the United Kingdom in 1957, headlining at the London Palladium. His shows included English comedian Dickie Henderson and Shirley Bassey. It marked the only time Torok has performed with a full pit orchestra with written arrangements on all the songs, led by Torok's own conductor, Maurice " Tex" Bromley, at the on-stage piano with him.

Torok also had another hits on the Billboard Hot 100 in 1957 – "Pledge of Love" hit No. 25 in 1957. "Pledge of Love" however was a bigger hit for Kenneth Copeland, who recorded over Torok's backing track. Unexpectedly, his previous country song "Caribbean" was re-released in 1959 after Robison sold the master to Guyden Records, and the song peaked at No. 27 on Billboard Hot 100. In 1960, "Pink Chiffon", also on Jamie/Guyden peaked at No. 60 and, in 1996, this song was used as main title music in RKO Pictures film Laura Smiles (2006). Torok also made further recordings for Mercury, and RCA. His last US chart entry was "Instant Love" for the Reprise record label in 1967.

== Later career in music and art ==
Torok continued to write songs, working in partnership with his wife (who has used both "Gayle Jones" and "Ramona Redd" as pseudonyms, the latter being her maiden name). Their songs were recorded by artists including: Skeeter Davis, Kitty Wells, Hank Snow and Willie Nelson, Jerry Wallace, Billy Walker, Barbara Eden, Glen Campbell, Dean Martin. Clint Eastwood sang their song, "No Sweeter Cheater than You" in the Warner Brothers Honky Tonk Man movie. They also wrote the title song "Look Out, Ol' Norwood's Comin' Home!" for Glen Campbell's Paramount movie Norwood, and five other songs on different Campbell albums, including "Arkansas, a tribute to Glen's home state. Hank Snow recorded Torok's songs: "Caribbean", "Dogbone", "My Arabian Baby" and "The Mysterious Lady From St. Martinique" on one of his last RCA albums. "The Redneck National Anthem" was a top 20 hit for Vernon Oxford in 1976.

Combining his art and music, Torok was commissioned to paint a 110-foot, five-panel mural titled "The History of the Grand Ol' Opry", which was on display in the Ryman Auditorium until it was remodeled for live performances. The mural served as a fund raiser for Hank Snow's Abused Children's Foundation while there, as tourists made donations after viewing the mural. He then created the "Elvis-a-Rama", which consisted of a 12-foot-high, 125-foot-long mural with a 22-minute light and music show depicting his life, from his truck driving days in Memphis to his death in 1977. It has been shown in Nashville, in Branson, and recently in Las Vegas, and has been signed by over 50,000 Elvis fans.

Mitchell and his writing-partner, wife Gail also created a tribute to Nashville's 200th birthday while writing for Cedarwood Music, with a 12-song LP recording titled Nashville, filled with songs based on Music City's history. They also wrote, produced and performed on a Texas history album, titled The Ballads of Texas. Torok also wrote a book and accompanying CD, titled Jim Reeves, Me & Mexican Joe, which tells the story of how the song made its way to Reeves. Torok also created smaller artistic tributes to Alabama coach Paul "Bear" Bryant, Dolly Parton, Big John Merritt and other smaller creations.

== Personal life and death ==
Torok married Gail Redd, a beauty queen, from Lufkin, Texas, in 1951. She died on August 3, 1985, at the age of 52.

In April 2014, it was reported that Torok had moved to Alvin, Texas at the age of 84, to live with his daughter. He died in Alvin on November 16, 2017, at the age of 88.

== Discography ==
- Caribbean – 1960 (Guyden)
- Guitar Course (Instant Fun) – 1966 (Reprise)

=== Singles ===
Year	Title	Chart positions		
Year	Title	US	US Country	UK
1953	"Caribbean"	—	1	—
1954	"Hootchey Kootchey Henry (From Hawaii)"	—	9	—
1956	"When Mexico Gave Up the Rhumba"	—	—	6
1957	"Red Light Green Light"	—	—	29
1957	"When Mexico Gave Up the Rhumba"	—	—	30
1957	"Pledge of Love"	26	—	—
1959	"Caribbean"^{A}	27	—	—
1959	"Mexican Joe"	102	—	—
1960	"Pink Chiffon"	60	—	—
1967	"Instant Love"	—	73	—

- ^{A}"Caribbean" also peaked at No. 26 on R&B Chart.
