= Don't Let the Stars Get in Your Eyes =

1952 country song

"Don't Let the Stars (Get in Your Eyes)"

Single by Slim Willet With The Brush Cutters
- B-side: "Hadacol Corners"
- Published: October 22, 1952
- Released: September 1952
- Genre: Country
- Length: 2:52
- Label: 4 Star
- Songwriter: Slim Willet

"Don't Let the Stars Get in Your Eyes" is a country song about a man away from home who is worried that his paramour may unwittingly stray from their relationship. It was written by Winston L. Moore (whose stage name was Slim Willet) and published in 1952. The song has been recorded in many different styles by many performers, with Perry Como's version hitting number 1 in both the US and UK.

The title comes from the opening refrain:

Don't let the stars get in your eyes,
Don't let the moon break your heart.

== Chart performance ==
The song was first recorded by Slim Willet and the Brush Cutters (4 Star 11614, reaching No. 1 in the Billboard country charts) and then by Ray Price (Columbia 4-21025, reaching No. 4 in the Country charts). Skeets McDonald followed with a Western swing version, reaching No. 1 and staying on the Country charts for 18 weeks. His version was released by Capitol Records (catalog number 2216, with the flip side "Big Family Trouble"). Slim Willet and Tommy Hill also wrote the female answer song "I Let the Stars Get In My Eyes", which was performed by Hill's sister, Goldie Hill.

"Don't Let the Stars Get in Your Eyes"

Single by Perry Como with The Ramblers
- B-side: "Lies"
- Published: October 22, 1952
- Released: November 1952
- Recorded: November 4, 1952
- Genre: Country, traditional pop
- Length: 2:44
- Label: RCA Victor
- Songwriter: Slim Willet
- Producer: Eli Oberstein

The most popular recording of the song, selling over a million and a half copies, was a pop version recorded by Perry Como with The Ramblers on November 4, 1952. It was released in several countries:

- In the United States, by RCA Victor, as a 78 rpm single record (catalog number 20-5064) and a 45 rpm single (catalog number 47-5064), with the flip side "Lies." This record reached No. 1 on the US Billboard Best Selling Singles charts.
- In Argentina by RCA Victor, as a single (catalog number 68-0722) with the flip side "No Hay Bote Como El De Remo."
- In the United Kingdom, by His Master's Voice, as a 78 rpm single (catalog number B-10400), with the flip side "To Know You (Is to Love You)." This release reached No. 1 in the UK Singles Chart in February 1953.
- In Germany, by His Master's Voice, as a 78 rpm single (catalog number X-8080), with the flip side "Outside of Heaven" by Eddie Fisher.

In the UK, "Don't Let the Stars Get in Your Eyes" first entered the sheet music charts on January 17, 1953. The song peaked at No. 1 on February 7, its fourth week on chart, staying there for a week. In total, it spent 16 weeks on the sheet music charts. The first recording to be issued in the UK was a British recording by Dennis Lotis in December 1952. The following month, versions were released by Gisele MacKenzie, Perry Como with The Ramblers, Jack Gray, Red Foley and veteran performer Gracie Fields. Other versions issued in the UK were by Troise and his Novelty Orchestra with The Four-in-A-Chord, Lola Ameche and Bobby Maxwell (harp) with The Windy City Symphony. Como's version was issued on 45 rpm in March 1953 as a separate release to his 78 rpm single (His Master's Voice 7M 118). That month also saw a parody version by Mickey Katz and his Orchestra released, titled "Don't let the Schmaltz get in your eyes". The versions by Ameche and Maxwell were re-issued by Mercury (who had taken over the original issuing label, Oriole) in June 1954.

The same week that the song entered the British sheet music charts, Como's version also entered the UK's singles chart, based on record sales (week ending January 16). The latter chart had only been launched in November 1952, and "Don't Let the Stars Get In Your Eyes" thus became the first of Como's many UK chart hits. It peaked at the top of the singles chart the same week that the song made No. 1 on the sheet music listing (week ending 6 February, its fourth week on chart). Como's recording – the only one to chart in the UK – spent five weeks at No. 1, and 15 weeks on chart in total.

== Other recorded versions ==
- Boxcar Willie (released by Mainstreet Records as catalog number 950, with the flip side "Boxcar Blues")
- Red Foley (recorded October 7, 1952, released by Decca Records as catalog number 28460, with the flip side "Sally")
- Dean Martin (1952 in a Dean Martin and Jerry Lewis radio show)
- Faron Young on the LP Talk About Hits! (1959)
- Henry Jerome (released by MGM Records as catalog number 11385, with the flip side "Keep It a Secret")
- Johnnie and Jack (released by RCA Victor Records as catalog number 20-5040, with the flip side "The Only One I Ever Loved, I Lost")
- George Jones (released October 1962 by United Artists Records on the album "George Jones Sings the Hits of His Country Cousins")
- Jimmy Justice (released 1964 by Blue Cat Records as catalog number 101, with the flip side "The Guitar Player (Her and Him)")
- Gisele MacKenzie (released by Capitol Records in the United States as catalog number 2256, with the flip side "My Favorite Song", and in Australia as catalog number CP-200, with the flip side "Adios")
- Bobby Maxwell (released by Mercury Records as catalog number 70047, with the flip side "Ching-Ching-A-Ling")
- The Parisian Sextet (released in 1962 by Challenge Records as catalog number 59137, with the flip side "The Poor People of Paris")
- Slim Whitman for his album I'll See You When (1973).
- Jerry Lee Lewis
- In 1977, Milton Berle, Florence Henderson & Tina Turner performed the song on an episode of The Brady Bunch Variety Hour.
- k.d. lang (released in 1988 by Sire Records as track number 8 on the album Shadowland)
- Jimmie Dale Gilmore (released in 2005 by Rounder Records as track 4 on the album Come on Back)
- Alberto Semprini recorded it as the third song of the medley "Dancing to the piano (No. 12) - Hit medley of quick-steps", along with "She Wears Red Feathers" and "Wild Roses." The medley was released by EMI on the His Master's Voice label as catalog number B 10457.
- The song was also covered by Eileen Barton in a recording issued by Coral Records as catalog number 60882, with the flip side "Tennessee Tango".
- It was spoofed by Homer and Jethro on their album America's Song Butchers: The Weird World of Homer and Jethro in a song entitled "Don't Let the Stars Get in Your Eyeballs," the lyrics of which are also found in a Steve Goodman song entitled "Talk Backwards."
- The song was recorded in 2008 by Australian singer and composer Alfio for his album Classic Rewinds which pays tribute to Perry Como, Dean Martin and 13 other popular Italian-American singers.
- LaVern Baker, for her album See See Rider on Atlantic Records (1962).

== See also ==
- List of number-one singles from the 1950s (UK)
- List of number-one singles of 1953 (U.S.)
