= Bonnie Lou =

American singer (1924–2015)

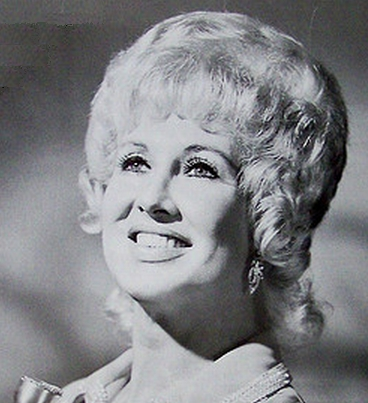
- Bonnie Lou in a 1972 publicity photo

Background information
- Also known as: Bonnie Lou
- Born: Mary Joan Kath; October 27, 1924; Towanda, Illinois, U.S.
- Died: December 8, 2015 (aged 91) Cincinnati, Ohio, U.S.
- Genres: Country; rock and roll; rockabilly
- Occupations: Singer; musician; TV and radio host
- Instrument: Vocals
- Years active: 1940s–1980s
- Labels: King; Fraternity
- Formerly of: Janis Martin; Wanda Jackson; Jo Ann Campbell

Mary Joan Okum (née Kath; October 27, 1924 – December 8, 2015), known by her performing name Bonnie Lou, was an American musical pioneer, recognized as one of the first female rock and roll singers. She is also one of the first artists to gain crossover success from country music to rock and roll. She was the "top name" on the first country music program regularly broadcast on a national TV network. Bonnie Lou was one of the first female co-hosts of a successful syndicated television talk show, and a regular musical performer on popular shows in the 1960s and 1970s. She "was a prime mover in the first days of rockabilly," and is a member of the Rockabilly Hall of Fame.

== Early life and rise to fame ==
Born in Towanda, Illinois, Kath's parents were Arthur and Eva Kath. "I was named after my grandmother Mary, and my grandfather Joe; and my mother added the -an onto the end of it. In spite of the spelling the family pronounced it as Jo Ann," Bonnie Lou noted in a 2007 interview. When the family home in Towanda burned down, they moved to Carlock, Illinois, where her father became a tenant farmer.

Kath grew up listening to Patsy Montana and her band "The Prairie Ramblers", and was greatly inspired by her. She learned how to yodel from her maternal grandmother Mary, who had emigrated from Switzerland. She started violin lessons when she was five, and her father bought her a "two dollar-and-a half pawnshop guitar" when she was 11.

In 1941, aged 16, she was singing and performing on WJBC (AM) in Bloomington, Illinois. At 17, after she graduated from high school, she sent an audition record to KMBC in Kansas City, Missouri, and was signed to a five-year contract to perform on the Brush Creek Follies barn dance show as "Sally Carson," and with a group called The Rhythm Rangers. The show was broadcast nationwide on the Columbia Broadcasting Service, and has been described as "one of the biggest music programs in the country" at the time. A newspaper columnist described her opening in Kansas City:

"She walked out into the spotlight and the crowds went ‘Ahhhh!'." A couple of minutes later she brought down the house! That's the history in brief of Sally Carson's first appearance as a regular songstress last Saturday on KMBC's Brush Creek Follies. You can close your eyes...and even her voice bubbles over with wim, wigor, and witality. Open up though, and the secret is no longer a secret — just look at them golden tresses!"

In 1945, Bill McCluskey, executive at WLW in Cincinnati, first learned of Bonnie Lou from a salesman he met on a train who "proceeded to rave about a young teenage country and western singer named Sally Carson who in his opinion was the best in the business..." McCluskey had the girl send a transcription of her singing to WLW. Impressed, he then requested a recording of her singing and yodeling "Train Whistle Blues." He hired her, however because KMBC owned the rights to "Sally Carson" had to change her name. She said "My real name is Mary Jo". He said "Not Country enough" and redubbed her as Bonnie Lou. She was promptly featured on Boone County Jamboree, which became Midwestern Hayride Country & Western Radio Program broadcasts and live tours.

Her contract with KMBC was voided because she was a minor when she signed it. Once known as Mary Jo, the Yodeling Sweetheart, Bonnie Lou now earned the devotion of listeners which would last the rest of her career. She performed regularly with the sister duo she had listened to as a child, the Girls of the Golden West, one of whom was McCluskey's wife. During her years with WLW, Bonnie Lou often performed at country music hub Nashville, Tennessee on weekends, including several times at the Grand Ole Opry.

On August 26, 1945, she married Glenn Ewins. She returned to Illinois with Ewins in 1947 and had her only child, Constance, September of that year. In 1950, two masked men entered her home at one a.m., shoved her into a kitchen closet, and demanded to know where her husband was, saying they wanted him to open the bank safe for them. She told them the safe was on a timer and couldn't be opened at night. They absconded leaving Bonnie Lou unharmed. In 1952 the Ewins family returned to Cincinnati and Bonnie Lou resumed work on Midwestern Hayride. On January 24, 1964, her husband died in a car accident in Cincinnati.

Bonnie Lou continued radio performances until the end of the 1940s. Some of her radio performances were cut to acetate and released to the public, but she didn't gain prominence as a recording artist until the 1950s.

== From yodeling sweetheart to rockabilly pioneer ==
In 1953, Bonnie Lou signed with her first record company, King Records in Cincinnati, Ohio. Early in her recording career, she performed country music songs. She soon had top-10 country hits with "Tennessee Wig Walk" and "Seven Lonely Days", each of which sold about 750,000 copies.

Bonnie Lou started recording rock and roll in a style later called rockabilly. In 1954, she recorded the song "Two-Step Side-Step", written by Murry Wilson, father of the Beach Boys Brian, Dennis, and Carl Wilson. In 1955, she released her first rock and roll record called "Daddy-O". The song rose to 14 on the Billboard chart and turned Bonnie Lou into a rock and roll star overnight. It wasn't until 1958 though that Bonnie Lou had another hit, a duet with Rusty York called "La Dee Dah". They soon recorded a Teen Pop song together called "I Let the School Bell Ding-a-Ling".

When her contract with King expired, Bonnie Lou could have signed with a major label, but declined since it would have required her moving to New York. "I was supposed to sign with RCA Victor, but instead I went with Fraternity Records just because it was local. I should have had more sense. I've always wanted to stay in Cincinnati, though, because of my family and profession." She released several different singles for Fraternity, but none was as successful as her King singles. WLW hampered her career by refusing to allow her time off to tour in support of her early recordings, which had sold well overseas, especially in England where her label was Parlophone, which was also The Beatles' label during most of the band's existence. "When the record hit the top twenty nationally, I asked the station if I could take some time off to tour. Management said no. That hurt: I couldn't promote the record or myself." Some of her records were also released by labels in Germany and the Netherlands. Reflecting on her recording career in the 1980s, she concluded that "the sound on my records was too mixed, part country, part R&B. It got the artists and the public confused, I believe. You to do one thing or the other. People won't accept it unless you focus. You can't have a mixed bag."

== Later career and personal life ==
As television eclipsed radio in popularity, Bonnie Lou's engaging personality and beauty allowed her to easily adapt to the visual medium. WLW's TV affiliate, WLWT, featured her prominently in several roles. For two decades she co-hosted and performed on the popular weekday program, the Paul Dixon Show. Their pairing began when Dixon approached her and said, "I'd like to have you with me every day. We fit one another." The show was perfect for a quick-witted, multi-faceted performer like Bonnie Lou, who noted, "The show was off the top of his head. You had to know how to ad lib."

Faithful to her country music roots, she was also the "top name" on WLWT's televised version of Midwestern Hayride, which began as a regional program and was eventually the first country music program regularly broadcast on a national TV network, NBC. Bonnie Lou, dubbed "Queen of the Hayride", (and sometimes affectionately referred to on the show as "Queenie") appeared on the program until it ceased production in 1972. She appeared regularly on the Ruth Lyons (broadcaster) 50-50 Club, an innovative live weekday talk and entertainment show that had 7 million viewers at its peak, though it was only aired regionally. In 1958, she and other WLWT luminaries recorded a Christmas album for Ruth Lyons's new record label that sold about 250,000 copies. As busy as her TV schedule was, she hosted Six Star Ranch, a WLW live music radio show transmitted nationwide by the Mutual Broadcasting System.

When Dixon's show ended not long after his death in 1974, Bonnie Lou semi-retired from show business to Monfort Heights, Ohio, a suburb of Cincinnati, with her second husband, Milton J. Okum (b. 1926), a furniture store owner and magician. They wed in Las Vegas, Nevada on January 2, 1966. Capitalizing on her public appeal, the Okums appeared together in TV commercials for the store. For a couple of years in the mid-1980s, she hosted a weekend country music show on WPFB in Middletown, Ohio. A 2013 look back at the station's history deemed Bonnie Lou "[p]erhaps the most beloved DJ that blessed the [station's] airwaves..." Due to her many years on radio and TV and performing in public, she was a household name in Cincinnati and across the country among viewers of the programs on which she was a regular performer. In her 80s, she still performed in public occasionally.

For decades Bonnie Lou was an indefatigable entertainer. Until her retirement she performed not just on radio and television, but at taverns, county fairs, conventions, trade shows, and countless other venues. Her accessibility, vivacity, and talent made her a headline favorite wherever she appeared. Even at 17, when her career was building momentum, a columnist for the Atchison (KS) Daily Globe wrote of the young performer that "When Sally Carson looks at us with that twinkle in her eyes, we're ready to believe anything."

On August 3, 2008, during a celebration of King Records and its musicians, Bonnie Lou was honored by Cincinnati with a key to the city.

In 2014 her fan club celebrated 50 years of continued existence with the same president, Ruth Tatman.

March 23, 2015, Bonnie Lou's home town, Towanda, Illinois, honored her with a joint resolution. The resolution invites "our local community and beyond to reflect on the talent and remarkable achievements of the hometown girl who grew up to be a star."

== Renewed interest in recordings and career ==
In 1971, BBC disk jockey Jimmy Savile played for his listeners Bonnie Lou's "Tennessee Wig Walk", which had reached number 4 on the British music charts in 1953. According to The Daily Telegraph, the song's "catchy rhythm and pause before the final two notes caught [football] fans' imagination, and within a few weeks it reverberated with new sets of lyrics – some of them repeatable – round every ground in the country." At the time of her death, the paper reported, the song was still "one of the most often heard of the 8,307 football anthems listed on one specialist website."

With a new century and renewed interest in early country and rockabilly music came an upsurge of interest in Bonnie Lou's recordings. In 2000, the CD Bonnie Lou - Doin' the Tennessee Walk: The Best of the King Years was released by British Westside Records, featuring all of her King hits. It is rated 4.5 (of 5) stars by AllMusic which calls it "an excellent anthology of an artist whose genre-straddling recordings will appeal to '50s country, rock, and pop music lovers". In 2009, Friction Heat (1953–58), a compilation of 32 of her King and Fraternity recordings, was released by the Great Voices of the Century label. Another compilation of 38 songs, Bonnie Lou: Rock-A-Billy Essentials, was released as a digital album in 2013 by Rockabilly Records. Most of her recordings, then, are available as commercial digital downloads or through popular streaming services. Some of her individual songs are included on multi-artist compilations, including a 2008 CD, Greatest Country Hits of 1953. Bonnie Lou's "Tennessee Wig Walk"' recording was featured in the 2010 film The Infidel.

On March 8, 2015, The Pantagraph newspaper of Bloomington, Illinois published an extended feature about Bonnie Lou's career, and a companion article about the longevity of her fan club.

== Death ==
Bonnie Lou died in her sleep on the morning of December 8, 2015 at Hillebrand Nursing And Rehabilitation Center in Cincinnati, Ohio, aged 91. She had dementia and was in hospice care.

Posthumous tributes to Bonnie Lou were featured by media throughout the world, including Europe, Asia, Africa, and Latin America. On December 11, 2015, The New York Times published a featured obituary for her in its printed edition.

Bonnie Lou is entombed in the Arlington Lakeside Chapel & Mausoleum at Arlington Memorial Gardens, Mount Healthy, Ohio.

== Discography ==
=== Albums ===
List of albums, showing year released, label, and formats
Title	Album details
Bonnie Lou Sings!	Released: 1958; Label: King; Formats: Vinyl
Daddy-O	Released: 1958; Label: King; Formats: Vinyl
Raining Down Happiness	Released: August 1972; Label: Wrayco; Formats: Vinyl
Doin' the Tennessee Wig-Walk: The Best of the King Years	Released: June 6, 2000; Label: Westside Records; Formats: CD, Digital streaming and copyright-free download (partial)
Danger! Heartbreak Ahead	Released: January 1, 2005; Label: BACM; Formats: CD
Friction Heat: 1953-58	Released: January 26, 2010; Label: Great Voices of the Century; Formats: CD
Bonnie Lou: Rock-A-Billy Essentials	Released: June 15, 2013; Label: Rockabilly Records; Formats: Digital download
Ruth Lyons: 10 Tunes of Christmas	Released: 1958; Label: Candee Records; Formats: Vinyl
Ruth Lyons: It's Christmas Time Again	Released: 1963; Label: Candee Records; Formats: Vinyl

=== Albums featured on ===
List of albums, showing year released, label, and formats
Title	Album details
Ruth Lyons: 10 Tunes of Christmas	Released: 1958; Label: Candee Records; Formats: Vinyl
Ruth Lyons: It's Christmas Time Again	Released: 1963; Label: Candee Records; Formats: Vinyl
The Christmas Music of Ruth Lyons	Released: 1995; Label: XStar Radio Network; Formats: CD

=== Singles ===
List of singles, with selected chart positions
Title	Year	Peak chart positions			Album
Title	Year	US Country	US	UK	Album
"Seven Lonely Days"	1953	7	—	—	Bonnie Lou Sings!
"Dancin' with Someone"	1953	—	—	—	—N/a
"Tennessee Wig-Walk"	1953	6	—	4	Bonnie Lou Sings!
"Pa-Paya Mama"	1953	—	—	—	Bonnie Lou Sings!
"The Texas Polka"	1953	—	—	—	Bonnie Lou Sings!
"Don't Stop Kissing Me Goodnight"	1954	—	—	—	—N/a
"Huckleberry Pie"	1954	—	—	—	—N/a
"Blue Tennessee Rain"	1954	—	—	—	—N/a
"Please Don't Laugh When I Cry"	1954	—	—	—	—N/a
"Darlin' Why" (with The Harmony Quartet)	1954	—	—	—	—N/a
"Tennessee Mambo"	1954	—	—	—	Bonnie Lou Sings!
"The Finger of Suspicion Points at You"	1955	—	—	—	—N/a
"A Rusty Old Halo"	1955	—	—	—	—N/a
"Old Faithful and True Love"	1955	—	—	—	—N/a
"Daddy-O"	1955	—	14	—	Bonnie Lou Sings!
"Little Miss Bobby Sox"	1956	—	—	—	Bonnie Lou Sings!
"Boll Weevil"	1956	—	—	—	Bonnie Lou Sings!
"Lonesome Lover"	1956	—	—	—	—N/a
"No Rock and Roll Tonight"	1956	—	—	—	Bonnie Lou Sings!
"I Want You"	1957	—	—	—	—N/a
"Kit 'N Kaboodle"	1957	—	—	—	—N/a
"Teen Age Wedding"	1957	—	—	—	Bonnie Lou Sings!
"Waiting in Vain"	1957	—	—	—	Bonnie Lou Sings!
"La Dee Dah" (with Rusty York)	1958	—	—	—	—N/a
"No One Ever Lost More"	1958	—	—	—	—N/a
"Friction Heat"	1958	—	—	—	—N/a
"Twenty Four Hours of Loneliness"	1962	—	—	—	—N/a
"The Tender Side of Me"	1971	—	—	—	Raining Down Happiness
"There's Been More Sun Than Rain"	1971	—	—	—	Raining Down Happiness
"—" denotes releases that did not chart
