= Bill Carlisle =

American singer-songwriter (1908–2003)

- Carlisle in the 1970s

Background information
- Also known as: Jumpin' Bill Carlisle
- Born: William Tolliver Carlisle; December 19, 1908
- Origin: Wakefield, Kentucky, United States
- Died: March 17, 2003 (aged 94) Nashville, Tennessee
- Genres: country music, comedy
- Occupation: singer, songwriter
- Instruments: guitar, banjo
- Years active: 1933–2003
- Labels: Decca, ARC, King, Mercury, Hickory
- Formerly of: Cliff Carlisle

William Toliver Carlisle (December 19, 1908 – March 17, 2003), better known as Bill Carlisle and Jumpin' Bill Carlisle, was an American country music singer, songwriter, comedian, and guitarist popular in the late 1940s and 1950s but who influenced the genre for more than 50 years. He is a member of the Country Music Hall of Fame.

== Biography ==
Carlisle was born in Wakefield, Kentucky southeast of Louisville. He performed in the 1920s with his older brother, Cliff Carlisle, on radio stations WLAP-AM in Lexington, Kentucky, and WNOX-AM in Knoxville, Tennessee. His first solo single and hit was the 1933 recording of "Rattlesnake Daddy," released on ARC Records. That year he formed the Carlisle Brothers with Cliff, and in 1938 they signed with Decca Records and continued performing on Kentucky country radio programs. He created an alter ego for the WNOX's Mid-Day Merry-Go-Round and Tennessee Barn Dance shows called Hot Shot Elmer, a bumbling buffoon in costume who would "interrupt" Carlisle's own performances. His leaps on stage won him the moniker "Jumpin' Bill."

Carlisle's guitar style was noted for its precision and speed, and he employed yodeling as a vocalist. Like his brother, he released many songs which included humorous, veiled references to sexuality. The duo signed with King Records after World War II, and hit big with the Ernest Tubb cover, "A Rainbow at Midnight", in 1946. Carlisle had a solo hit in 1948 with "Tramp on the Street". Cliff retired from the business about 1950, and Bill put together a backing ensemble, The Carlisles, though none of them was related to him. Among its members were singer Martha Carson and songwriter Betty Amos.

Carlisle signed with Mercury Records and continued to release novelty song hits in the 1950s, such as "Too Old to Cut the Mustard", a top ten country hit in 1951 later covered by artists including Rosemary Clooney and Marlene Dietrich. Other hits included the number one smash "No Help Wanted" (their biggest) and the top ten "Taint Nice (To Talk Like That)", both 1953. That year the Carlisles were invited to join the Grand Ole Opry. In the mid-1950s, Carlisle was a regular performer on ABC-TV's Ozark Jubilee.

He also wrote the gospel song "Gone Home," which has been recorded by Flatt & Scruggs, Ricky Skaggs, and the Jerry Garcia Acoustic Band. Carlisle said he never recorded the song himself because he "just did so much better with the novelty stuff."

== Personal life ==
In 1953, Carlisle, his wife, and children, Bill Jr. (born 1942), and Sheila, moved to Minden in Webster Parish, Louisiana, to be near the Louisiana Hayride in Shreveport. At the time Tillman Franks of Shreveport was his manager.

His children became members of The Carlisles group in the 1960s; his last hit was "What Kinda Deal Is This", released in 1965. After his fame receded, he continued as a regular at the Opry, appearing less than two weeks before his death on March 17, 2003, in Nashville, Tennessee.

== Legacy ==
Carlisle was elected to the Country Music Hall of Fame in September 2002.

== Chart singles ==
Year	Single	US Country
1946	"Rainbow at Midnight" (Carlisle Brothers)	5
1948	"Tramp on the Street"	14
1951	"Too Old to Cut the Mustard" (The Carlisles)	6
1953	"No Help Wanted" (The Carlisles)	1
1953	"Knothole" (The Carlisles)	3
1953	"Is Zat You, Myrtle" (The Carlisles)	2
1953	"Tain't Nice (To Talk Like That)" (The Carlisles)	5
1954	"Shake-a-Leg" (The Carlisles)	15
1954	"Honey Love" (The Carlisles)	12
1965	"What Kinda Deal Is This"	4
