= Goldie Hill =

American country music singer-songwriter (1933–2005)

- Hill in a promotional photo

Background information
- Born: Argolda Voncile Hill; January 11, 1933
- Origin: Karnes City, Texas, United States
- Died: February 24, 2005 (aged 72) Nashville, Tennessee, U.S.
- Genre: Country
- Occupations: singer, songwriter
- Instruments: vocals, guitar
- Years active: 1953–2005
- Labels: Decca Records; Epic Records
- Spouse: Carl Smith (m. 1957)

Argolda Voncile "Goldie" Hill (January 11, 1933 – February 24, 2005) was an American country music singer. She was one of the first women in country music and became one of the first women to reach the top of the country music charts with her number-one 1953 hit, "I Let the Stars Get in My Eyes". Along with Kitty Wells and Jean Shepard, she helped set the standard for later women in country music.

== Biography ==
Hill was born in Karnes City, Texas, in 1933, a small town southeast of San Antonio. She was the sister of singer Tommy Hill.

She performed with her brothers Tommy and Ken. She then auditioned as a solo singer at Decca Records. Her first single, "Why Talk to my Heart", was released in 1952. Hill recorded the song "I Let the Stars Get in My Eyes" the same year as a riposte to Perry Como's "Don't Let the Stars Get in Your Eyes", written by her brother, Tommy Hill. It became a number-one hit. In 1954, she followed up with two hit duets with singer Justin Tubb, son of Ernest Tubb. In the early 1960s, she recorded two albums for Decca Records. She regularly performed on Louisiana Hayride, Grand Ole Opry, and Ozark Jubilee. She made a short-lived comeback in the late 1960s with the label Epic Records under the name Goldie Hill Smith.

Hill married country singer Carl Smith in 1957 and the couple had two sons (Carl, Jr. and Larry Dean) and one daughter (Lori Lynn). They remained married for 47 years until her death on February 24, 2005. Hill died from complications of cancer. She was 72 years old. Her husband survived her by five years.

== Discography ==
Goldie Hill discography
- Studio albums: 6
- Singles: 35
- No. 1 Singles (Overall): 1

=== Albums ===
Year	Album details
1960	Goldie Hill: Released: 1960; Label: Decca
1961	Lonely Heartaches: Released: May 1961; Label: Decca
1962	According to My Heart: Released: 1962; Label: Decca
1964	Country Hit Parade: Released: January 1964; Label: Decca
1967	Goldie Hill Sings Again: Released: 1967; Label: Epic
1968	Country Gentleman's Lady: Released: February 1968; Label: Epic

=== Singles ===
Year	Song	US Country	Album
1952	"Why Talk to My Heart"	—	non-album singles
1952	"I Let the Stars Get In My Eyes"	1	non-album singles
1953	"I'm Yvonne (On the Bayou)"	—	non-album singles
1953	"My Love Is Flame"	—	non-album singles
1953	"Let Me Be the One"	—	non-album singles
1954	"Liquor and Women"	—	non-album singles
1954	"Young at Heart"	—	non-album singles
1954	"Looking Back to See" (with Justin Tubb)	4	non-album singles
1954	"Cry, Cry Darling"	—	non-album singles
1954	"Treat Me Kind"	—	non-album singles
1954	"Sure Fire Kisses" (with Justin Tubb)	11	non-album singles
1955	"Are You Mine" (with Red Sovine)	14	non-album singles
1955	"Why Don't You Let Me Go"	—	non-album singles
1955	"Steel Guitar"	—	non-album singles
1956	"Sample My Kissin'"	—	non-album singles
1956	"Footsteps"	—	non-album singles
1957	"Wasted Love Affair"	—	non-album singles
1957	"Till I Said It to You"	—	non-album singles
1959	"Yankee, Go Home" (Recitation by Red Sovine)	17	non-album singles
1959	"Honky Tonk Music"	—	non-album singles
1960	"Living Alone"	—	non-album singles
1960	"Baby Blue"	—	non-album singles
1961	"It's a Lovely, Lovely World"	—	Goldie Hill
1961	"Lonely Heartaches"	—	Lonely Heartaches
1961	"Live for Tomorrow"	—	According to My Heart
1962	"I'm Afraid"	—	non-album singles
1962	"Little Boy Blue"	—	non-album singles
1963	"Baby Go Slow"	—	non-album singles
1963	"I'm Gonna Bring You Down"	—	Country Hit Parade
1963	"Closer"	—	non-album singles
1964	"Don't Let Him"	—	non-album singles
1964	"Three's a Crowd"	—	non-album singles
1967	"There's Gotta Be More to Life (Than Lovin' a Man)"	—	Goldie Hill Sings Again
1968	"Lovable Fool"	73	non-album singles
1968	"Got Me Sumpin' Goin'"	—	non-album singles
"—" denotes releases that did not chart
