= Slim Willet =

American singer-songwriter

Slim Willet (born Winston Lee Moore; December 1, 1919 – July 1, 1966) was an American disc jockey, musician, and songwriter.

Born in Dublin, Texas, Moore attended Hardin-Simmons University in Abilene and graduated in 1949 with a degree in journalism. He got a job as a country music deejay at Abilene radio station KRBC, where he worked until 1956.

While there, he formed his ensemble, the Hired Hands. Taking the stage name Slim Willet, he released his debut single in 1950 "Tool Pusher from Snyder". The group appeared on the Big D Jamboree in Dallas on WFAA until 1954, as well as on Louisiana Hayride from 1951 to 1955. He released several hit singles during this time, among them "Red Rose", "No Love Song to You", and "Don't Let the Stars Get in Your Eyes", which became a major hit for both Perry Como and Skeets McDonald in 1952.

Leaving his label, 4 Star, in 1954, he started his label, Winston, and began releasing solo material, in addition to working as a deejay at Abilene station KCAD, until he died of a heart attack in 1966, aged 46.

== Legacy ==
He was inducted into the Country Music DJ Hall of Fame in 1994.
