= Mexican Joe (song) =

Single by Jim Reeves

from the album Bimbo
- B-side: "I Could Cry"
- Released: March 1953 (U.S.)
- Recorded: January 18, 1953; KWKH, Shreveport, Louisiana
- Genre: Country
- Length: 2:39
- Label: Abbott Records 116 (original 1953 release); RCA Victor (reissue)
- Songwriter: Mitchell Torok
- Producer: Fabor Robinson

Jim Reeves singles chronology
"Wagon Load Of Love" (1953)	"Mexican Joe" (1953)	"Butterfly Love" (1953)

"Mexican Joe" is 1953 single by Jim Reeves. Accompanying Jim Reeves on "Mexican Joe" were the Circle O Ranch Boys, and was Jim Reeves' debut single on the country charts. "Mexican Joe" hit number one on the country charts for six weeks with a total of 26 weeks on the chart.

== Song background ==
Featuring "Big" Red Hayes on the fiddle and Floyd Cramer on the piano, "Mexican Joe" was a rollicking, Western swing-influenced tale of a bandito and drifter who engages in a lifestyle of women, carousing, and gambling.

Reeves — an announcer on KWKH-AM in Shreveport, Louisiana, in the early 1950s — had released several singles prior to "Mexican Joe", but none attained the level of national success needed to reach any of Billboard's country music component charts in use at the time. "Mexican Joe" became Reeves' first major success nationally and eventually paved the way to superstardom. As was the case with several of Reeves' early national hits, "Mexican Joe" differed greatly from the smooth ballads — recorded in the style of the Nashville sound, in contrast to those early novelty hits — that he later recorded and made famous, including "Four Walls" and "He'll Have to Go."
