= Jim Reeves =

American singer (1923–1964)

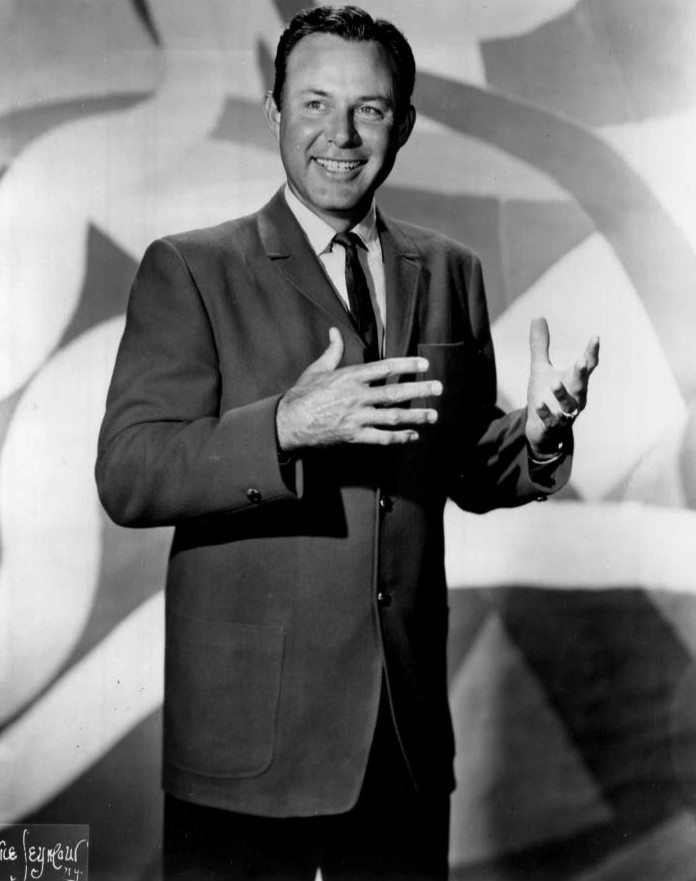
- Reeves in 1963

Background information
- Also known as: Gentleman Jim
- Born: James Travis Reeves; August 20, 1923; Galloway, Texas, U.S.
- Died: July 31, 1964 (aged 40) Davidson County, Tennessee, U.S.
- Genres: Country; Nashville sound; gospel; blues; Western swing
- Occupations: Musician; singer; songwriter; actor
- Years active: 1948–1964
- Labels: RCA Victor; London; Fabor; Macy; Abbott
- Spouse: Mary White (m. 1947)

James Travis Reeves (August 20, 1923 – July 31, 1964) was an American singer, songwriter, and musician. One of the earliest pioneers and practitioners of the Nashville sound, he played a central role in the sonic development of country music in the 1960s. Known as "Gentleman Jim", his songs continued to chart for years after his death in a plane crash. He is a member of both the Country Music and Texas Country Music Halls of Fame.

== Biography ==
=== Early life and education ===
James Travis Reeves was born on August 20, 1923, at his family home in Galloway, Texas, a small rural community near Carthage. The youngest of eight children of Thomas Middleton Reeves (1882-1924) and Mary Beulah Adams Reeves (1884-1980), he was known as Travis during his early years. He graduated from Carthage High School in 1942.

Reeves received an athletic scholarship to the University of Texas, where he enrolled to study speech and drama, but he left after six weeks to work in the Houston shipyards. He later returned to baseball, playing in semiprofessional leagues before signing in 1944 as a right-handed pitcher with a St. Louis Cardinals farm team. He spent three years in the minor leagues until a pitching injury severed his sciatic nerve, ending his athletic career.

=== Early career ===
Reeves' initial efforts to pursue a baseball career were sporadic, possibly due to his uncertainty as to whether he would be drafted into the military, as World War II enveloped the United States. On March 9, 1943, he reported to the Army Induction Center in Tyler, Texas, for his preliminary physical examination. He failed the exam (probably due to a heart irregularity), though, and on 4 August 1943, an official letter declared his 4-F draft status. Reeves began to work as a radio announcer and sang live between songs. During the late 1940s, he was contracted with a couple of small Texas-based recording companies, but without success. Reeves at this point was influenced by early country and western swing artists, including Jimmie Rodgers and Moon Mullican, as well as popular singers Bing Crosby, Eddy Arnold, and Frank Sinatra. In the late 1940s, Reeves joined Moon Mullican's band, and as a solo artist, Reeves recorded Mullican-style songs, including "Each Beat of my Heart" and "My Heart's Like a Welcome Mat" in the late 1940s and early 1950s.

During these years, Reeves took a job as an announcer for KWKH-AM in Shreveport, Louisiana, then the home of the popular radio program Louisiana Hayride. According to former Hayride master of ceremonies Frank Page, who had introduced Elvis Presley on the program in 1954, singer Sleepy LaBeef was late for a performance, and Reeves was asked to substitute. (Other accounts—including that of Reeves himself, in an interview on the RCA Victor album Yours Sincerely—name Hank Williams as the absentee.)

=== Initial success in the 1950s ===
Jim Reeves was a country music singer who had success early on in his career, first with the song "Mexican Joe" in 1953 for Abbott Records. Other hits followed, such as "I Love You" (a duet with Ginny Wright), and "Bimbo", which reached number one on the U.S. country chart in 1954. In addition to those early hits, Reeves recorded many other songs for Fabor Records and Abbott Records. In 1954, Abbott Records released a 45 single with "Bimbo" on the A-side, which hit number one and featured Little Joe Hunt of the Arkansas Walk of Fame. Jim Reeves and Hunt had met at the Louisiana Hayride, which was Louisiana's equivalent to Nashville's Grand Ole Opry. After performing on the Louisiana Hayride in Shreveport, Reeves and Hunt traveled and performed together for several years in the dance halls and clubs of East Texas and rural Arkansas. Reeves became the headliner, with Hunt as the backup performer. Due to his growing popularity, Reeves went on to release his first album in November 1955, Jim Reeves Sings (Abbott 5001), which proved to be one of Abbott Records' few album releases. Reeves' star was on the rise because he had already been signed to a 10-year recording contract with RCA Victor by Steve Sholes, who went on to produce some of Reeves' first recordings at RCA Victor. Sholes signed another performer from the Louisiana Hayride that same year (1955), Elvis Presley. Most of the talented performers of the 1950s, such as Reeves, Presley, Jerry Lee Lewis, Jim Ed Brown, Maxine Brown, the Wilburn Brothers, and Little Joe Hunt got their start on the Louisiana Hayride. In addition to there, Jim Reeves joined the Grand Ole Opry, also in 1955. Reeves also made his first appearance on ABC-TV's Ozark Jubilee in 1955. He was such a hit with the fans that he was invited to act as fill-in host from May through July 1958 on that popular program.

From his earliest recordings with RCA Victor, Reeves relied on the loud, East Texas style, which was considered standard for country and western performers of that time, but he developed a new style of singing over the course of his career. He said, "One of these days.....I'm gonna sing like I want to sing!" So, he decreased his volume and used the lower registers of his singing voice, with his lips nearly touching the microphone. Amid protests from RCA, but with the endorsement of his producer Chet Atkins, Reeves used this new style in a 1957 recording, a demonstration song of lost love that had originally been intended for a female voice. It was titled "Four Walls", which not only scored number one on the country music chart, but also scored number 11 on the popular music chart. This recording marked his transition from novelty songs to serious country-pop music, and according to one source, "established Reeves as a country balladeer". "Four Walls" and "He'll Have to Go" (1959) defined Reeves' style.

Reeves was instrumental in creating a new style of country music that used violins and lusher background arrangements that soon became known as the Nashville Sound. This new sound was able to cross genres, which made Reeves even more popular as a recording artist.

Reeves became known as a crooner because of his light yet rich baritone voice. Because of his vocal style, he was also considered a talented artist because of his versatility in crossing the music charts. He appealed to audiences that were not necessarily country/western. His catalog of songs such as "Adios Amigo", "Welcome to My World", and "Am I Losing You?" demonstrated this appeal. Many of his Christmas songs have become perennial favorites, including "C-H-R-I-S-T-M-A-S", "Blue Christmas", and "An Old Christmas Card".

Between 1957 and 1958, Reeves was the host of a radio show on the ABC network. Debuting on October 7, 1957, the program was broadcast weekdays from 1:00 to 2:00 pm from Nashville, Tennessee. It featured the Anita Kerr Singers and Owen Bradley's orchestra. This was also when he began shifting from cowboy outfits to sports jackets.

Reeves is also responsible for popularizing many gospel songs, including "We Thank Thee", "Take My Hand, Precious Lord", "Across the Bridge", and "Where We'll Never Grow Old". He was given the nickname Gentleman Jim, an apt description of his character both on stage and off.

=== Early 1960s and international fame ===
Reeves scored his greatest success with the Joe Allison composition "He'll Have to Go", a success on both the popular and country music charts, which earned him a platinum record. Released during late 1959, it scored number one on Billboard's Hot Country Songs chart on February 8, 1960, which it scored for 14 consecutive weeks. Country music historian Bill Malone noted that while it was in many ways a conventional country song, its arrangement and the vocal chorus "put this recording in the country-pop vein". In addition, Malone lauded Reeves' vocal styling—lowered to "its natural resonant level" to project the "caressing style that became famous"—as to why "many people refer to him as the singer with the velvet voice." In 1963, he released his Twelve Songs of Christmas album, which had the well-known songs "C-H-R-I-S-T-M-A-S" and "An Old Christmas Card". During 1975, RCA Victor producer Chet Atkins told interviewer Wayne Forsythe, "Jim wanted to be a tenor, but I wanted him to be a baritone... I was right, of course. After he changed his voice to that smooth, deeper sound, he was immensely popular."

Reeves' international popularity during the 1960s, surpassing his popularity in the United States at times, helped to give country music a worldwide market for the first time. According to Billboard, "Reeves’ star shone equally bright overseas in the United Kingdom, India, Germany, and even South Africa. Jim Reeves was hugely popular in Sri Lanka in the 1960s and 1970s and presently he is the most popular English-language singer in Sri Lanka.

==== South Africa ====
During the early 1960s, Reeves was more popular in South Africa than Elvis Presley, and he recorded several albums in the Afrikaans language. In 1963, he toured and starred in a South African film, Kimberley Jim. In the film, he sang part of one song in Afrikaans. The film was released with a special prologue and epilogue in South African cinemas after Reeves' death, praising him as a true friend of the country. The film was produced, directed, and written by Emil Nofal. Reeves later said that he enjoyed the film-making experience and would consider devoting more of his career to this medium. The film was released in South Africa (and also in the US) in 1965 after Reeves's death.

Reeves was one of an exclusive trio of performers to have released an album there that played at the little-used 16 2/3 rpm speed. This unusual format was more suited to the spoken word and was quickly discontinued for music. The only other artists known to have released such albums in South Africa were Elvis Presley and Slim Whitman.

==== Britain and Ireland ====
Reeves toured Britain and Ireland during 1963, between his tours of South Africa and continental Europe. Reeves and the Blue Boys were in Ireland from May 30 to June 19, 1963, with a tour of US military bases from June 10 to 15, when they returned to Ireland. They performed in most counties in Ireland, though Reeves occasionally abbreviated performances because he was unhappy with the available pianos at concert venues. In a June 6, 1963, interview with Spotlight magazine, Reeves expressed his concerns about the tour schedule and the condition of the pianos, but said he was pleased with the audiences.

A press reception for him at the Shannon Shamrock Inn was organized by Tom Monaghan of Bunratty Castle, County Clare. Showband singers Maisie McDaniel and Dermot O'Brien welcomed him on May 29, 1963. A photograph appeared in the Limerick Leader on June 1, 1963. Press coverage continued from May until Reeves' arrival with a photograph of the press reception in The Irish Press. Billboard magazine in the US also reported the tour before and after. The single "Welcome to My World" with the B-side "Juanita" was released by RCA Victor during June 1963 and bought by the distributors Irish Records Factors Ltd. This scored the record number one while Reeves was there during June.

A number of accounts of his dances were given in the local newspapers, with a good one in The Kilkenny People of his dance in the Mayfair Ballroom, where 1,700 people were present. A photograph in The Donegal Democrat had Reeves' singing in the Pavesi Ball Room on June 7, 1963, and an account of his nonappearance on stage in The Diamond, Kiltimagh, County Mayo in The Western People representing how the tour went in different areas.

He planned to record an album of popular Irish songs and had three number-one songs in Ireland during 1963 and 1964: "Welcome to My World", "I Love You Because", and "I Won't Forget You". The last two are estimated to have sold 860,000 and 750,000, respectively, in Britain alone, excluding Ireland. Reeves had 11 songs in the Irish chart from 1962 to 1967. He recorded two ballads, "Danny Boy" and "Maureen". "He'll Have to Go" was his most popular song there and was at number one and on the chart for months. He was one of the most popular recording artists in Ireland, in the first 10 after the Beatles, Elvis Presley, and Cliff Richard.

He was permitted to perform in Ireland by the Irish Federation of Musicians on the condition that he share the bill with Irish show bands, becoming popular by 1963. The British Musicians' Union would not permit him to perform there, because no agreement existed for British show bands to travel to America, in exchange for the Blue Boys playing in Britain. Reeves did, however, perform for British radio and TV programmes.

During the 1960s, at the early stage of his career, Elton John performed at various pubs in England, frequently playing songs by Reeves.

==== Norway ====
Reeves performed at the Njårdhallen sports arena in Oslo on April 15, 1964, appearing with Bobby Bare, Chet Atkins, the Blue Boys, and the Anita Kerr Singers. Two concerts were given; the second was televised and recorded by Norwegian broadcaster NRK, the country's sole network at the time. The full performance was not captured, and several of Reeves' final songs were not recorded, though he was reported to have performed "You’re the Only Good Thing (That's Happened to Me)" during this portion of the show. The program has been rebroadcast on NRK multiple times.

Reeves' first major success in Norway, "He’ll Have to Go," reached number one and remained on the top‑10 chart for 29 weeks. "I Love You Because" became his most successful single in the country, reaching number one in 1964 and staying on the chart for 39 weeks. His albums spent a combined 696 weeks on Norway's top‑20 chart, making him one of the most popular recording artists in Norwegian music history.

=== Last recording session ===
Reeves' last two recording sessions for RCA Victor took place on July 2, 1964, producing "Make the World Go Away", "Missing You", and "Is It Really Over?" With time still available at the end of the session, he proposed recording an additional song and completed "I Can't Stop Loving You", which became his final RCA studio recording.

He made one further recording later that month at the small studio in his home. In late July 1964, only days before his death in an airplane crash, Reeves recorded "I’m a Hit Again" with acoustic‑guitar accompaniment. Because it was a home recording not owned by RCA Victor, it was not issued by the label, but it was released in 2003 by VoiceMasters as part of a collection of previously unreleased material.

=== Personal life ===
Reeves married Mary White on September 3, 1947. The couple did not have any children. He was named in a paternity suit, but the claim was dismissed, as he was reported to be sterile.

=== Death ===
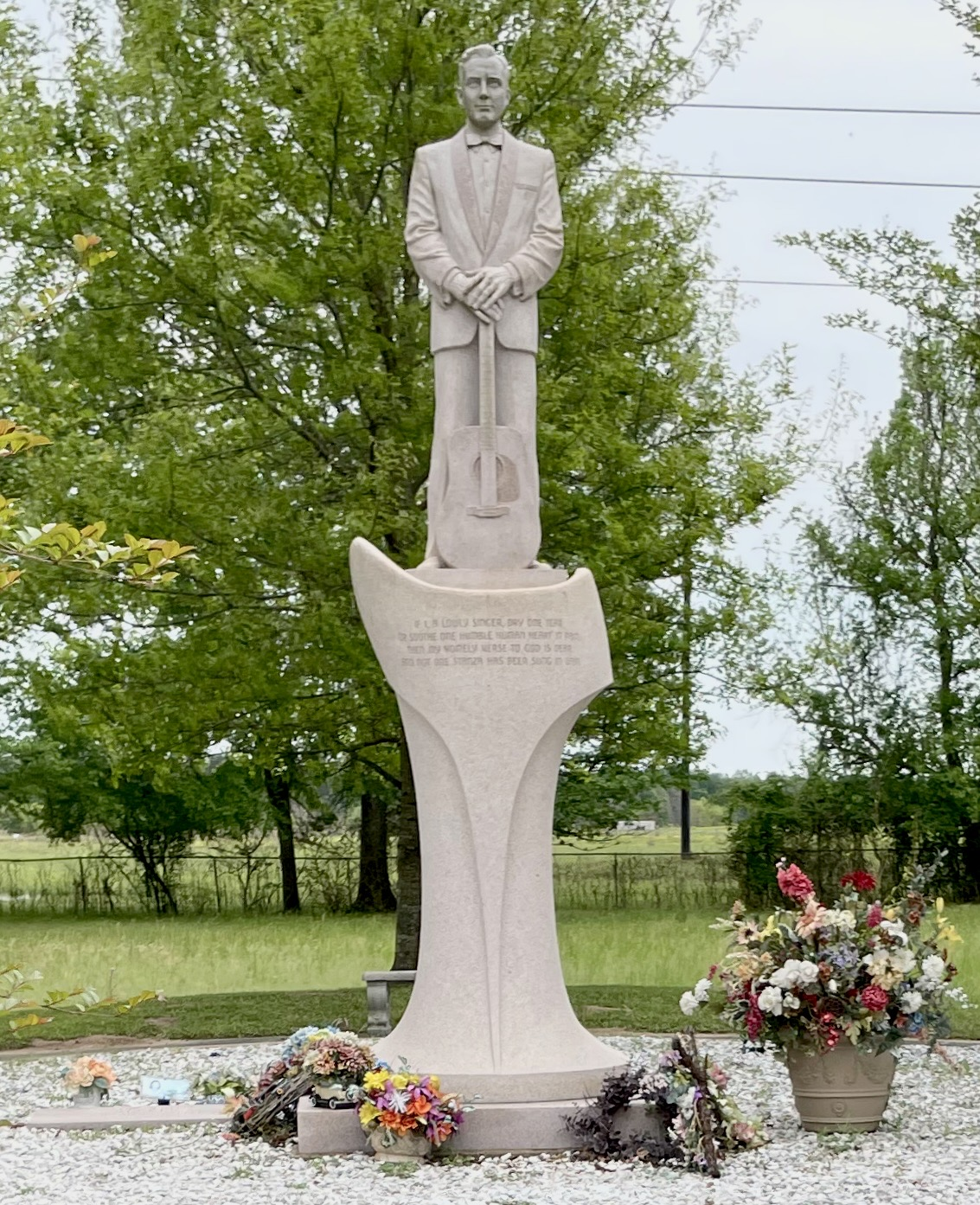
Jim Reeves Memorial near Carthage, Texas, where Reeves is buried

On July 31, 1964, Reeves and his manager, Dean Manuel, left Batesville, Arkansas, for Nashville to attend a real-estate appointment. They traveled in a single-engined Beechcraft Debonair, with Reeves piloting the aircraft. While crossing the Brentwood area of Tennessee, the plane entered a severe thunderstorm. The subsequent investigation concluded that Reeves attempted to turn toward the Franklin Road corridor to reach the nearby airport rather than follow air-traffic control instructions to turn away from the storm. In the limited visibility, he lost visual reference to the ground, the aircraft stalled under full power, and it descended into a low-altitude spin. The crash occurred around 4:52 pm.

Search teams located the wreckage 42 hours later in a wooded area near Baxter Lane. The impact had driven the nose and engine deep into the soil, and both Reeves and Manuel were found within the remains of the aircraft. Their deaths were formally confirmed on August 2, leading to widespread mourning within the country music community. Two days later, a procession carried Reeves' casket through Nashville, where thousands of fans gathered and covered the vehicle with flowers.

Reeves was buried at the Jim Reeves Memorial near Carthage, Texas, on a one-acre site along U.S. Route 79. The memorial includes a life-size statue of Reeves holding a guitar, and his dog, Cheyenne, is also buried at the site.

== Legacy ==
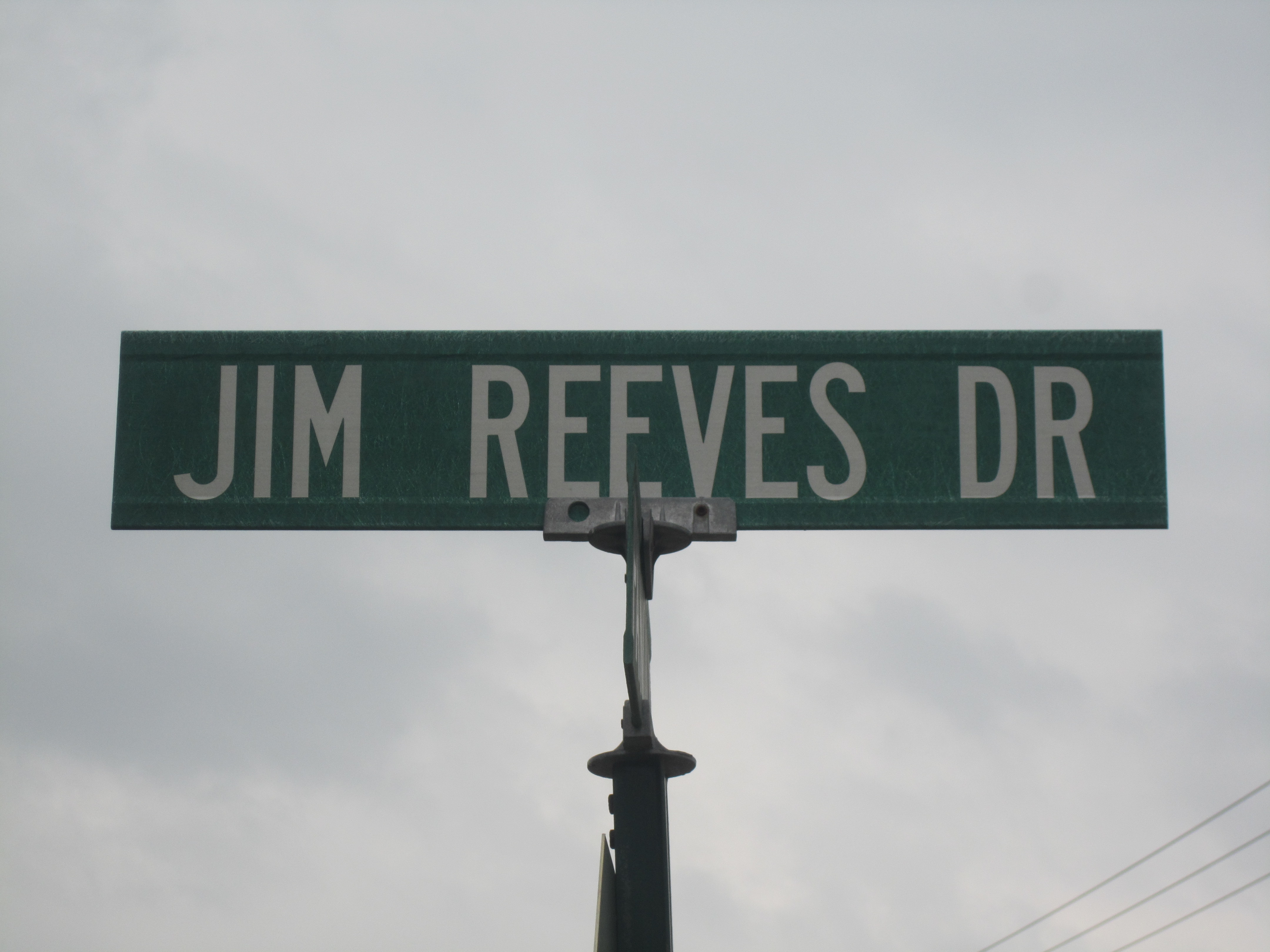
Jim Reeves Drive at the Texas Country Music Hall of Fame in Carthage, Texas

Reeves was elected posthumously to the Country Music Hall of Fame during 1967, which honored him by saying, "The velvet style of 'Gentleman Jim Reeves' was an international influence. His rich voice brought millions of new fans to country music from every corner of the world. Although the crash of his private airplane took his life, posterity will keep his name alive because they will remember him as one of the most important performers in country music."

In 1998, Reeves was inducted into the Texas Country Music Hall of Fame in Carthage, Texas, where the Jim Reeves Memorial is located. The inscription on the memorial reads, "If I, a lowly singer, dry one tear, or soothe one humble human heart in pain, then my homely verse to God is dear, and not one stanza has been sung in vain."

Each year, the Academy of Country Music awards the Jim Reeves International Award to an artist who has made an "outstanding contributions to the acceptance of country music throughout the world and has done the most to promote the genre worldwide".

=== Posthumous releases ===
Reeves' records continued to sell well, both earlier and new albums issued after his death. According to Billboard, "Reeves' career continued to thrive with hit records on the Billboard charts throughout the next two decades". The last Reeves song on the chart was "The Image of Me" in 1984.

His widow, Mary, was instrumental in the ongoing success of the songs. She combined unreleased tracks with previous releases (placing updated instrumentals alongside Reeves' original vocals) to produce a regular series of "new" albums after her husband's death. She also operated the Jim Reeves Museum in Nashville from the mid-1970s until 1996. On the 15th anniversary of Reeves' death, Mary told a country music magazine interviewer, "Jim Reeves my husband is gone; Jim Reeves the artist lives on." Since 2006 the museum is in Voxna, Edsbyn, Sweden.

During 1966, Reeves' record "Distant Drums" hit number one on the UK Singles Chart and remained there for five weeks. The song stayed in the UK chart for 25 weeks, and took number one on the US country music chart. Originally, "Distant Drums" had been recorded merely as a demo for its composer, Cindy Walker, believing it was for her personal use and had been deemed "unsuitable" for general release by Chet Atkins and RCA Victor. During 1966, however, RCA determined a market for the song existed because of the war in Vietnam. It was named Song of the Year in the UK during 1966 by the BBC, and Reeves became the first American artist to receive the accolade. That same year, singer Del Reeves (no relation) recorded an album paying tribute to him.

In 1980, Reeves was credited with two more top-10 posthumous duet hits, "Have You Ever Been Lonely?" and "I Fall to Pieces", which combined separate vocal tracks of both Reeves and the late country star Patsy Cline, who had also died in an airplane crash midcareer. Although the two had never recorded together, producers Chet Atkins and Owen Bradley lifted their isolated vocal performances off original three-track stereo master session tapes, resynchronized them, and combined them with digitally re-recorded backing tracks. The duets first appeared on the Remembering Patsy Cline & Jim Reeves LP.

Reeves' compilation albums containing well-known standards continue to sell well. The Definitive Collection scored number 21 in the UK albums chart during July 2003, and Memories are Made of This reached number 35 during July 2004.

Since 2003, US-based VoiceMasters has issued more than 80 previously unreleased Reeves recordings, including new songs, as well as newly overdubbed material. Among them was "I'm a Hit Again", the last song he recorded in his basement studio just a few days before his death. VoiceMasters overdubbed this track in the same studio in Reeves' former home (then owned by a Nashville record producer). The song was released in 2008 by H&H Music (UK) and became number one in a survey of radio stations in the UK. Reeves' fans repeatedly urged RCA or Bear Family to re-release some of the songs overdubbed during the years after his death, which have never appeared on CD.

A compilation CD, The Very Best of Jim Reeves, scored number eight on initial release in the UK Albums Chart during May 2009, to later score its maximum of number seven during late June, his first top-10 album in the UK since 1992. In 1994, the German Bear Family Records label released a 16-CD compilation titled Welcome to my World, including more than 75 unissued titles, and many demo recordings.

In 2014, a set of eight CDs was released by Intermusic S.A., titled The Great Jim Reeves, containing 170 tracks, remastered and remixed.

=== Tributes ===
Tributes to Reeves were composed in the British Isles after his death. The song "A Tribute to Jim Reeves" was written by Eddie Masterson, and recorded by Larry Cunningham and the Mighty Avons; during January 1965, it scored on the UK chart and top 10 in Ireland. It scored the UK chart on December 10, 1964, and was there for 11 weeks and sold 250,000 copies. The Dixielanders Show Band also recorded "Tribute to Jim Reeves" written by Steve Lynch and recorded during September 1964; it scored on the Northern Ireland chart during September 1964. The Masterson song was translated later into Dutch and recorded.

In the UK, "We'll Remember You" was written by Geoff Goddard, but not released until 2008 on the Now & Then: From Joe Meek to New Zealand double album by Houston Wells.

Jerry Jerry and the Sons of Rhythm Orchestra, a Canadian alternative rock band whose musical style blends elements of surf music, gospel music, rockabilly, garage, and punk, released the song entitled "Jimmy Reeves" on their 1992 album Don't Mind If I Do

Reeves remains a popular artist in Ireland, and many Irish singers have recorded tribute albums. A play by author Dermot Devitt, Put Your Sweet Lips, was based on Reeves' appearance in Ireland at the Pavesi Ballroom in Donegal town on June 7, 1963, and reminiscences of people who attended.

Blind rhythm and blues and blues music artist Robert Bradley (of the band Robert Bradley's Blackwater Surprise) paid tribute to Reeves in the album description of his release, Out of the Wilderness. He said, "This record brings me back to the time when I started out wanting to be a singer-songwriter, where the music did not need the New York Philharmonic to make it real...I wanted to do a record and just be Robert and sing straight like Jim Reeves on 'Put Your Sweet Lips a Little Closer to the Phone'."

British comedian Vic Reeves adopted his stage name from Reeves and Vic Damone, two of his favorite singers.

In the United States, Del Reeves (no relation) recorded and released a 1966 album entitled Del Reeves Sings Jim Reeves.

Reeves' nephew, singer-songwriter John Rex Reeves (March 4, 1936 – November 15, 2022), appeared occasionally on RFD-TV's Midwest Country, singing Reeves' songs, as well as other popular country songs. John Rex, a recording artist in his own right, had two songs on the Billboard Hot Country Singles chart in 1981 ("What Would You Do" at number 93 and "You're the Reason" at number 90). John Rex died after a long illness in Kingwood, Texas, at age 86.

In 2023, "He'll Have to Go", an independent short film named after Reeves' song of the same name, was released and won the Finalist Award at the SWIFF International Film Festival for "Best Short Film".
