= List of Billboard number-one country songs of 1948 =

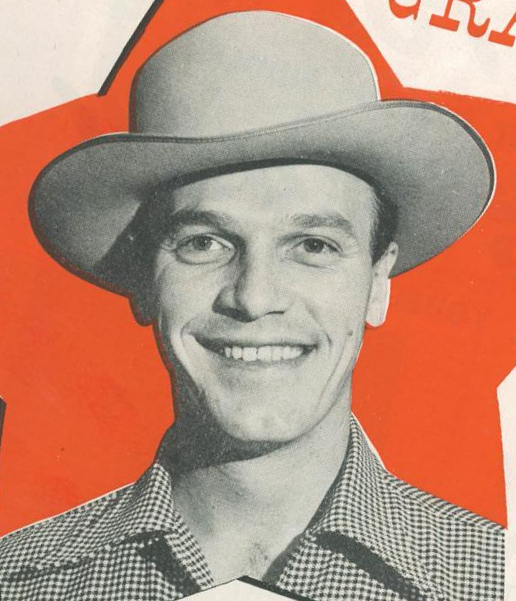
Eddy Arnold almost completely dominated the number one spot in 1948.

In 1948, Billboard magazine published two charts specifically covering the top-performing country music songs in the United States. At the start of the year, Billboard's sole ranking of country music recordings was based on the number of times a song had been played in jukeboxes. The Most Played Juke Box Folk Records chart had been published since 1944 and was compiled based on a weekly survey of "a selected group of juke box operators whose locations require folk records". In May, the magazine added a second country music chart, the Best Selling Folk Retail Records listing, based on a similar survey of "a selected group of retail stores, the majority of whose customers purchase folk records". The Juke Box Folk chart was discontinued in 1957 and the Best Sellers chart the following year; both are considered part of the lineage of the magazine's current country music songs charts.

The number-one position on both charts was dominated almost entirely during 1948 by vocalist Eddy Arnold and his backing band the Tennessee Plowboys. One of the biggest country stars of the late 1940s, Arnold was at number one on the jukebox chart at the start of the year with "I'll Hold You in My Heart (Till I Can Hold You in My Arms)", which had been in the top spot for eight weeks in 1947 and remained there for a further thirteen weeks in 1948. This total of 21 weeks at number one set a record for Billboard's country charts which would stand for 65 years, until the duo Florida Georgia Line spent a 22nd week in the top spot with "Cruise" in 2013. "I'll Hold You in My Heart" was replaced in the top spot by another of Arnold's songs, "Anytime", and this in turn was followed by runs at number one by three more of his songs. Between them, the five songs occupied the number-one position through the issue of Billboard dated November 27, meaning that Arnold had topped the chart for more than a year without interruption. In the November 27 issue, another artist topped the chart for the first time in 1948 when Jimmy Wakely's "One Has My Name (The Other Has My Heart)" tied with Arnold's "Just a Little Lovin' (Will Go a Long Way)" for the number one position, before going on to take the top spot outright the following week. Three weeks later, however, Arnold returned to number one in the final issue of the year.

Arnold was equally dominant on the retail chart, topping the listing with five songs including "A Heart Full of Love (For a Handful of Kisses)", which peaked only at number 3 on the jukebox chart. Jimmy Wakely was again the only other artist to reach the number one spot. Arnold ended the year in the number one position on both charts, albeit with different songs. He would remain popular into the 1950s before his career went into a decline. He revived his fortunes in the mid-1960s by embracing the "Nashville sound", a newer style of country music which eschewed elements of the earlier honky-tonk style in favor of smooth productions which had a broader appeal, and ended his career with a record total of 28 country number one singles. Wakely, a former singing cowboy in Western movies, would remain popular until the 1970s but his final appearance in the upper reaches of the country chart was in 1951.

== Chart history ==
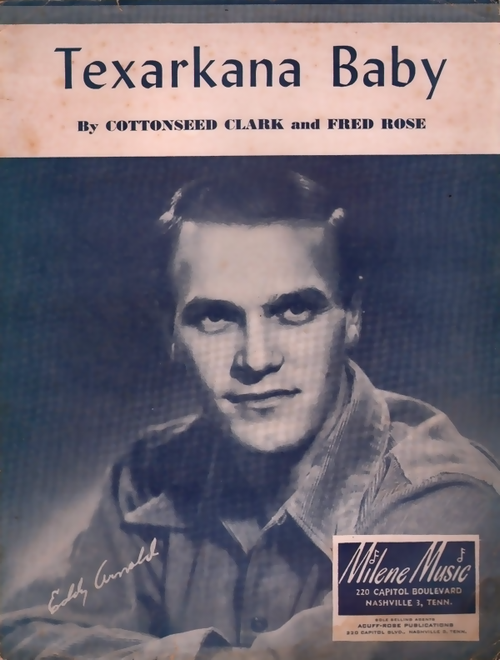
"Texarkana Baby" was one of several songs by Eddy Arnold to top both charts.

Jimmy Wakely was the only singer other than Arnold to reach number one in 1948.

Chart history
Issue date	Most Played Juke Box Folk Records		Best Selling Retail Folk Records		Ref.
Issue date	Title	Artist(s)	Title	Artist(s)	Ref.
January 3	"I'll Hold You in My Heart (Till I Can Hold You in My Arms)"	Eddy Arnold and his Tennessee Plowboys^{[a]}	—		
January 10	"I'll Hold You in My Heart (Till I Can Hold You in My Arms)"	Eddy Arnold and his Tennessee Plowboys^{[a]}	—		
January 17	"I'll Hold You in My Heart (Till I Can Hold You in My Arms)"	Eddy Arnold and his Tennessee Plowboys^{[a]}	—		
January 24	"I'll Hold You in My Heart (Till I Can Hold You in My Arms)"	Eddy Arnold and his Tennessee Plowboys^{[a]}	—		
January 31	"I'll Hold You in My Heart (Till I Can Hold You in My Arms)"	Eddy Arnold and his Tennessee Plowboys^{[a]}	—		
February 7	"I'll Hold You in My Heart (Till I Can Hold You in My Arms)"	Eddy Arnold and his Tennessee Plowboys^{[a]}	—		
February 14	"I'll Hold You in My Heart (Till I Can Hold You in My Arms)"	Eddy Arnold and his Tennessee Plowboys^{[a]}	—		
February 21	"I'll Hold You in My Heart (Till I Can Hold You in My Arms)"	Eddy Arnold and his Tennessee Plowboys^{[a]}	—		
February 28	"I'll Hold You in My Heart (Till I Can Hold You in My Arms)"	Eddy Arnold and his Tennessee Plowboys^{[a]}	—		
March 6	"I'll Hold You in My Heart (Till I Can Hold You in My Arms)"	Eddy Arnold and his Tennessee Plowboys^{[a]}	—		
March 13	"I'll Hold You in My Heart (Till I Can Hold You in My Arms)"	Eddy Arnold and his Tennessee Plowboys^{[a]}	—		
March 20	"I'll Hold You in My Heart (Till I Can Hold You in My Arms)"	Eddy Arnold and his Tennessee Plowboys^{[a]}	—		
March 27	"I'll Hold You in My Heart (Till I Can Hold You in My Arms)"	Eddy Arnold and his Tennessee Plowboys^{[a]}	—		
April 3	"Anytime"	Eddy Arnold and his Tennessee Plowboys^{[a]}	—		
April 10	"Anytime"	Eddy Arnold and his Tennessee Plowboys^{[a]}	—		
April 17	"Anytime"	Eddy Arnold and his Tennessee Plowboys^{[a]}	—		
April 24	"Anytime"	Eddy Arnold and his Tennessee Plowboys^{[a]}	—		
May 1	"Anytime"	Eddy Arnold and his Tennessee Plowboys^{[a]}	—		
May 8	"Anytime"	Eddy Arnold and his Tennessee Plowboys^{[a]}	—		
May 15	"Anytime"	Eddy Arnold and his Tennessee Plowboys^{[a]}	"Anytime"	Eddy Arnold and his Tennessee Plowboys^{[a]}	
May 22	"Anytime"	Eddy Arnold and his Tennessee Plowboys^{[a]}	"Anytime"	Eddy Arnold and his Tennessee Plowboys^{[a]}	
May 29	"Anytime"	Eddy Arnold and his Tennessee Plowboys^{[a]}	"Anytime"	Eddy Arnold and his Tennessee Plowboys^{[a]}	
June 5	"Texarkana Baby"	Eddy Arnold and his Tennessee Plowboys^{[a]}	"Bouquet of Roses"	Eddy Arnold and his Tennessee Plowboys^{[a]}	
June 12	"Texarkana Baby"	Eddy Arnold and his Tennessee Plowboys^{[a]}	"Texarkana Baby"	Eddy Arnold and his Tennessee Plowboys^{[a]}	
June 19	"Bouquet of Roses"	Eddy Arnold and his Tennessee Plowboys^{[a]}	"Bouquet of Roses"	Eddy Arnold and his Tennessee Plowboys^{[a]}	
June 26	"Bouquet of Roses"	Eddy Arnold and his Tennessee Plowboys^{[a]}	"Bouquet of Roses"	Eddy Arnold and his Tennessee Plowboys^{[a]}	
July 3	"Texarkana Baby"	Eddy Arnold and his Tennessee Plowboys^{[a]}	"Bouquet of Roses"	Eddy Arnold and his Tennessee Plowboys^{[a]}	
July 10	"Bouquet of Roses"	Eddy Arnold and his Tennessee Plowboys^{[a]}	"Bouquet of Roses"	Eddy Arnold and his Tennessee Plowboys^{[a]}	
July 17	"Bouquet of Roses"	Eddy Arnold and his Tennessee Plowboys^{[a]}	"Bouquet of Roses"	Eddy Arnold and his Tennessee Plowboys^{[a]}	
July 24	"Bouquet of Roses"	Eddy Arnold and his Tennessee Plowboys^{[a]}	"Bouquet of Roses"	Eddy Arnold and his Tennessee Plowboys^{[a]}	
July 31	"Bouquet of Roses"	Eddy Arnold and his Tennessee Plowboys^{[a]}	"Bouquet of Roses"	Eddy Arnold and his Tennessee Plowboys^{[a]}	
August 7	"Bouquet of Roses"	Eddy Arnold and his Tennessee Plowboys^{[a]}	"Bouquet of Roses"	Eddy Arnold and his Tennessee Plowboys^{[a]}	
August 14	"Bouquet of Roses"	Eddy Arnold and his Tennessee Plowboys^{[a]}	"Bouquet of Roses"	Eddy Arnold and his Tennessee Plowboys^{[a]}	
August 21	"Bouquet of Roses"	Eddy Arnold and his Tennessee Plowboys^{[a]}	"Bouquet of Roses"	Eddy Arnold and his Tennessee Plowboys^{[a]}	
August 28	"Bouquet of Roses"	Eddy Arnold and his Tennessee Plowboys^{[a]}	"Bouquet of Roses"	Eddy Arnold and his Tennessee Plowboys^{[a]}	
September 4	"Bouquet of Roses"	Eddy Arnold and his Tennessee Plowboys^{[a]}	"Bouquet of Roses"	Eddy Arnold and his Tennessee Plowboys^{[a]}	
September 11	"Bouquet of Roses"	Eddy Arnold and his Tennessee Plowboys^{[a]}	"Bouquet of Roses"	Eddy Arnold and his Tennessee Plowboys^{[a]}	
September 18	"Bouquet of Roses"	Eddy Arnold and his Tennessee Plowboys^{[a]}	"Just a Little Lovin' (Will Go a Long Way)"	Eddy Arnold and his Tennessee Plowboys^{[a]}	
September 25	"Bouquet of Roses"	Eddy Arnold and his Tennessee Plowboys^{[a]}	"Bouquet of Roses"	Eddy Arnold and his Tennessee Plowboys^{[a]}	
October 2	"Bouquet of Roses"	Eddy Arnold and his Tennessee Plowboys^{[a]}	"Bouquet of Roses"	Eddy Arnold and his Tennessee Plowboys^{[a]}	
October 9	"Just a Little Lovin' (Will Go a Long Way)"	Eddy Arnold and his Tennessee Plowboys^{[a]}	"Just a Little Lovin' (Will Go a Long Way)"	Eddy Arnold and his Tennessee Plowboys^{[a]}	
October 16	"Just a Little Lovin' (Will Go a Long Way)"	Eddy Arnold and his Tennessee Plowboys^{[a]}	"Bouquet of Roses"	Eddy Arnold and his Tennessee Plowboys^{[a]}	
October 23	"Just a Little Lovin' (Will Go a Long Way)"	Eddy Arnold and his Tennessee Plowboys^{[a]}	"Just a Little Lovin' (Will Go a Long Way)"	Eddy Arnold and his Tennessee Plowboys^{[a]}	
October 30	"Just a Little Lovin' (Will Go a Long Way)"	Eddy Arnold and his Tennessee Plowboys^{[a]}	"Bouquet of Roses"	Eddy Arnold and his Tennessee Plowboys^{[a]}	
November 6	"Just a Little Lovin' (Will Go a Long Way)"	Eddy Arnold and his Tennessee Plowboys^{[a]}	"Just a Little Lovin' (Will Go a Long Way)"	Eddy Arnold and his Tennessee Plowboys^{[a]}	
November 13	"Bouquet of Roses"	Eddy Arnold and his Tennessee Plowboys^{[a]}	"One Has My Name (The Other Has My Heart)"	Jimmy Wakely	
November 20	"Just a Little Lovin' (Will Go a Long Way)"	Eddy Arnold and his Tennessee Plowboys^{[a]}	"Bouquet of Roses"	Eddy Arnold, the Tennessee Plowboy, and his Guitar	
November 27^{[b]}	"Just a Little Lovin' (Will Go a Long Way)"	Eddy Arnold and his Tennessee Plowboys^{[a]}	"One Has My Name (The Other Has My Heart)"	Jimmy Wakely	
November 27^{[b]}	"One Has My Name (The Other Has My Heart)"	Jimmy Wakely	"One Has My Name (The Other Has My Heart)"	Jimmy Wakely	
December 4	"One Has My Name (The Other Has My Heart)"	Jimmy Wakely	"One Has My Name (The Other Has My Heart)"	Jimmy Wakely	
December 11	"One Has My Name (The Other Has My Heart)"	Jimmy Wakely	"One Has My Name (The Other Has My Heart)"	Jimmy Wakely	
December 18	"One Has My Name (The Other Has My Heart)"	Jimmy Wakely	"One Has My Name (The Other Has My Heart)"	Jimmy Wakely	
December 25	"Bouquet of Roses"	Eddy Arnold, the Tennessee Plowboy, and his Guitar	"A Heart Full of Love (For a Handful of Kisses)"	Eddy Arnold, the Tennessee Plowboy, and his Guitar	

a. Charts from the issue of Billboard dated November 6 onwards showed the artist credit as "Eddy Arnold, the Tennessee Plowboy, and his Guitar".
b. Two songs tied for number one on the Juke Box chart.

== See also ==
- 1948 in music
- 1948 in country music
- List of artists who reached number one on the U.S. country chart
