= Timeline of Billboard number-one country songs =

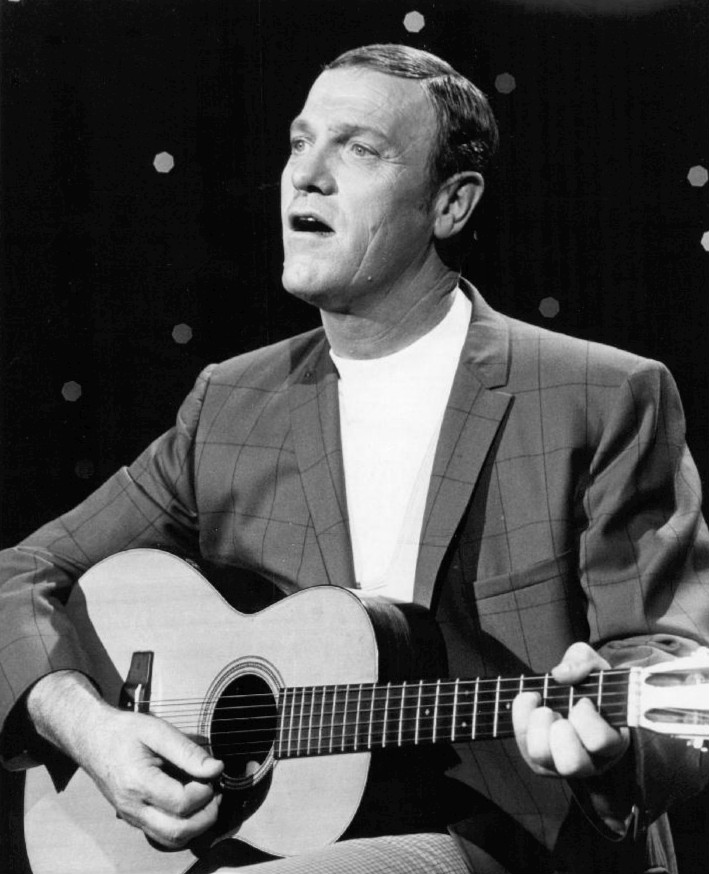
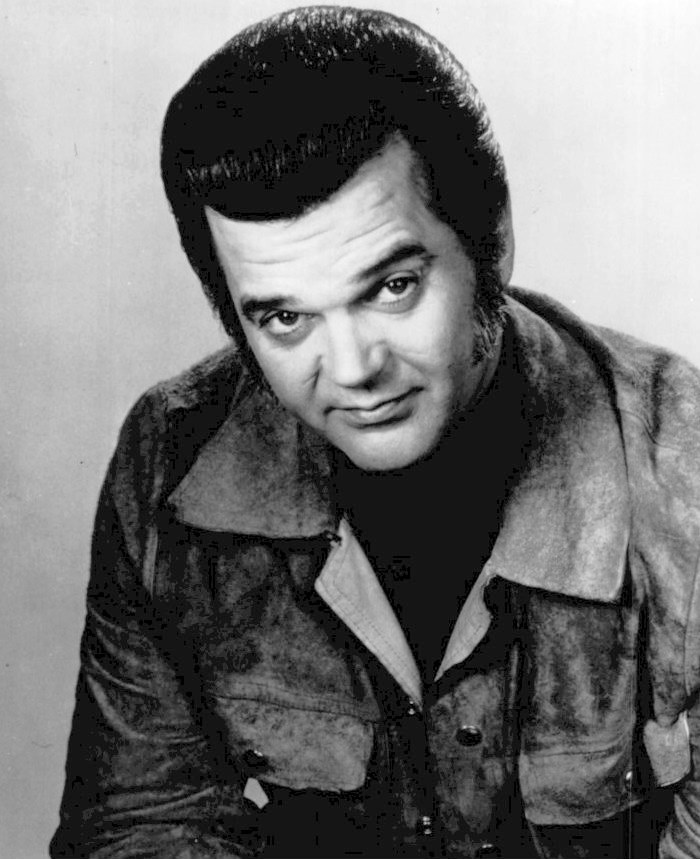
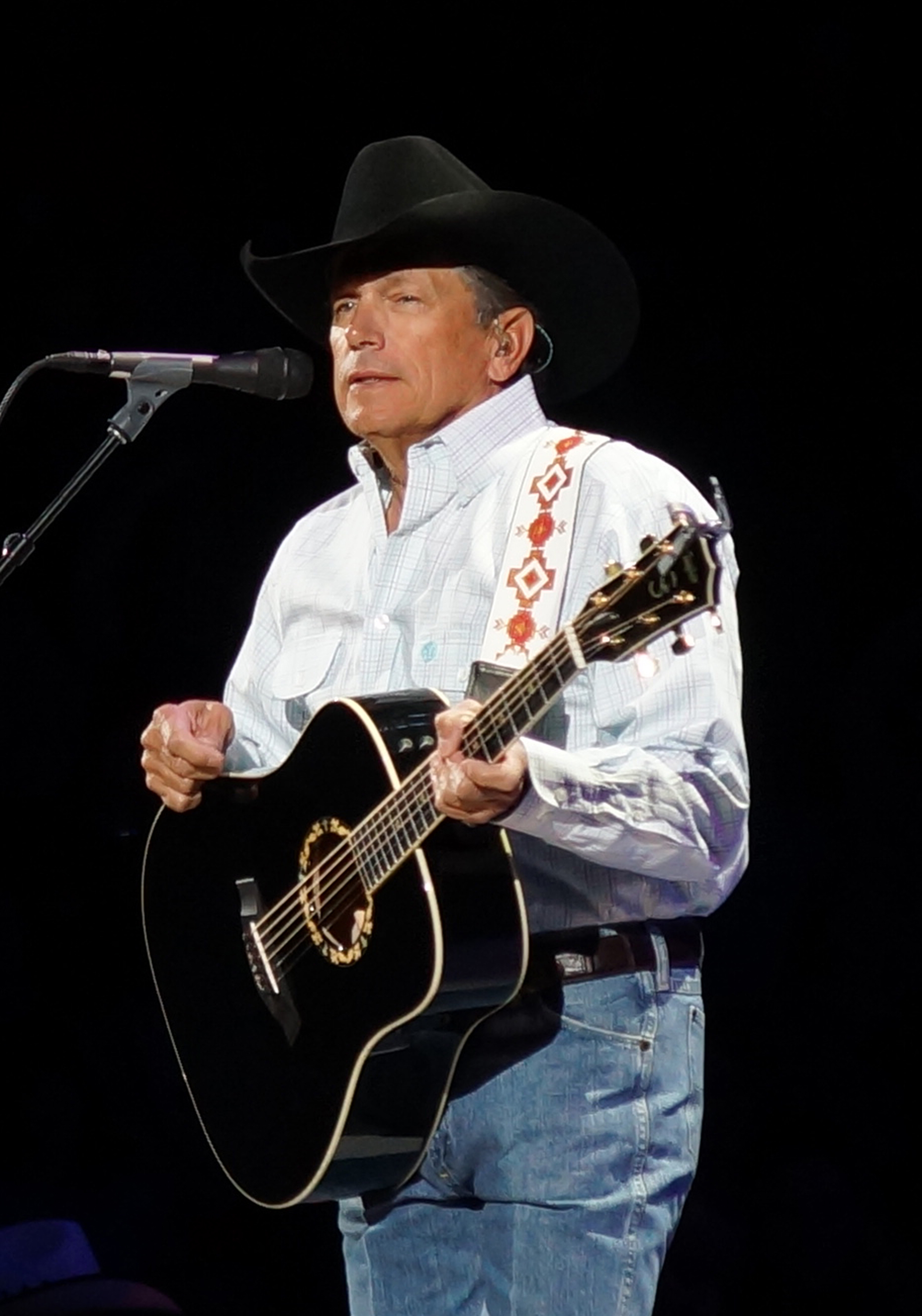
Eddy Arnold, Conway Twitty and George Strait have all held the record for the greatest number of country number ones.

Billboard magazine has published charts ranking the top-performing country music songs in the United States since 1944. The first country chart was published under the title Most Played Juke Box Folk Records in the issue of the magazine dated January 8, 1944, and tracked the songs most played in the nation's jukeboxes. The first number one was the song "Pistol Packin' Mama", different recordings of which were bracketed together and treated as one entry. Billboard added a second chart in 1947 based on retail sales, and a third in 1949 based on radio airplay. The jukebox chart was discontinued in 1957, and the following year, the remaining two charts were dropped and replaced with a chart, initially entitled Hot C&W Sides, which combined sales and airplay data into one overall ranking. The chart was renamed Hot Country Singles in 1962, Hot Country Singles and Tracks in 1990, and Hot Country Songs in 2005. In 1990, its methodology changed to use only airplay data from country music radio stations. In 2012, this changed again to use data from stations of all formats as well as sales and streaming information. At the same time, a new Country Airplay chart was introduced, which continued the former methodology of tracking plays on country stations only.

In the late 1940s and early 1950s, Eddy Arnold was the biggest star in country music and set several chart records, one of which endured for more than 60 years. His 1947 song "I'll Hold You in My Heart (Till I Can Hold You in My Arms)" spent a total of 21 weeks at number one, a record that would be equaled twice over the next decade but not broken until 2013. He gained 28 number-one songs, a record that would stand until 1980, when it was broken by Conway Twitty, who ultimately gained 40 number ones. George Strait broke Twitty's record in 2006 and by 2021 had achieved 44 chart-toppers. Long runs at number one became increasingly uncommon after the 1960s; in the entirety of the 1980s, no song spent longer than three weeks in the top spot, and in 1986 there was a different song at number one every week. This changed, however, in the 21st century, especially after the change in methodology of Hot Country Songs in 2012. The record for the longest-running country number one was broken by "Cruise" by Florida Georgia Line, which spent 24 weeks atop the Hot Country Songs chart in 2012 and 2013, a figure subsequently exceeded by "Body Like a Back Road" by Sam Hunt (34 weeks in 2017) and "Meant to Be" by Bebe Rexha and Florida Georgia Line (50 weeks in 2017 and 2018). The songs that have topped the chart have reflected the evolution of the country music genre over the decades. The honky-tonk style of the 1940s and 1950s was overtaken in the 1960s by the "Nashville Sound", a smoother style with a broader appeal. In the 1970s, the country-pop style increasingly enabled country artists to achieve success on the pop music charts, and in more recent decades, some of the most successful songs have incorporated elements of hip hop music.

== Chart history ==
Each entry in the "Year" column links to the list of number ones for that particular year.

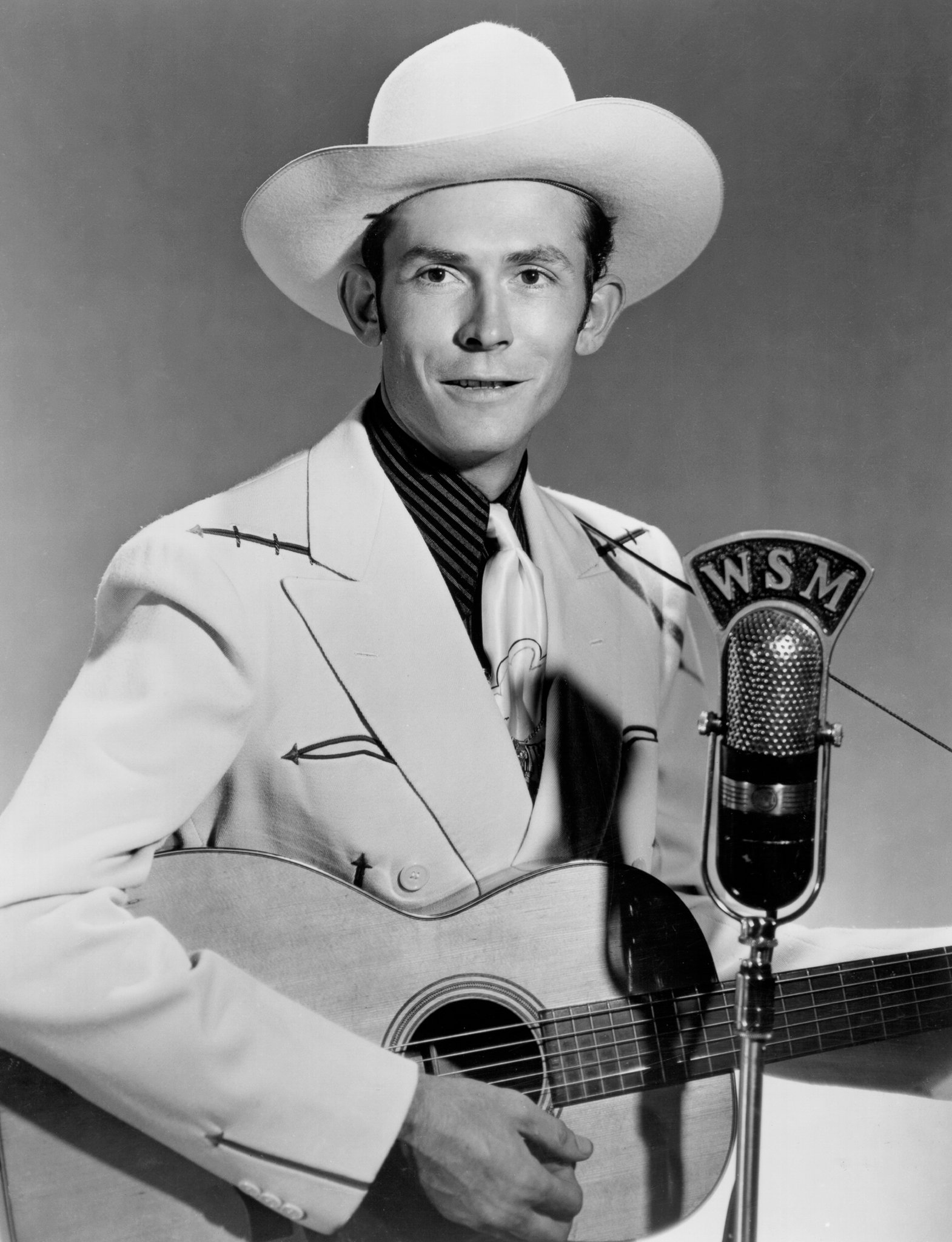
Hank Williams gained his first number one in 1949.

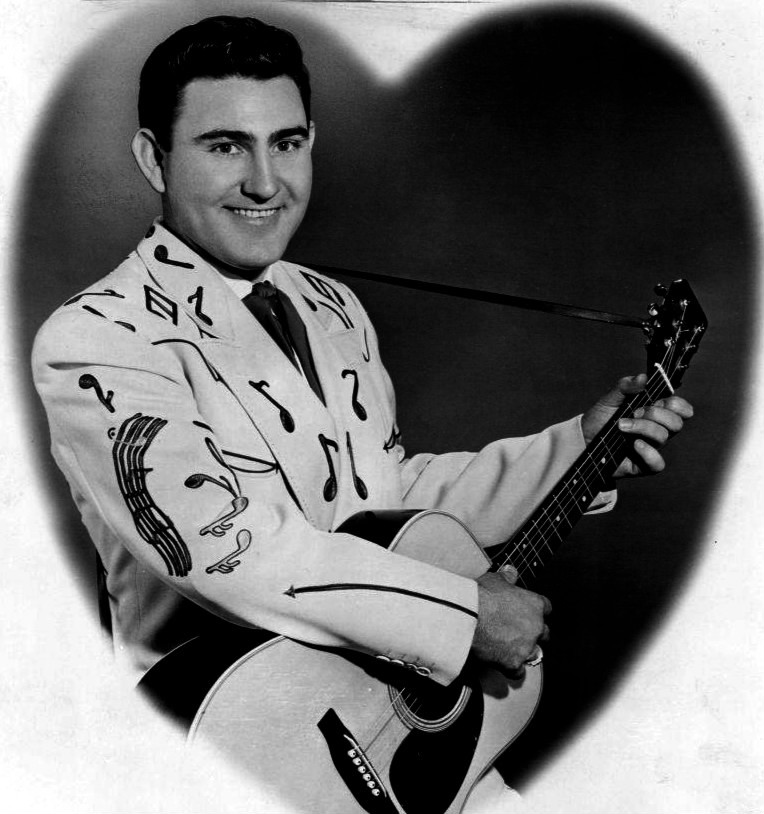
Webb Pierce was one of the biggest country stars of the 1950s.

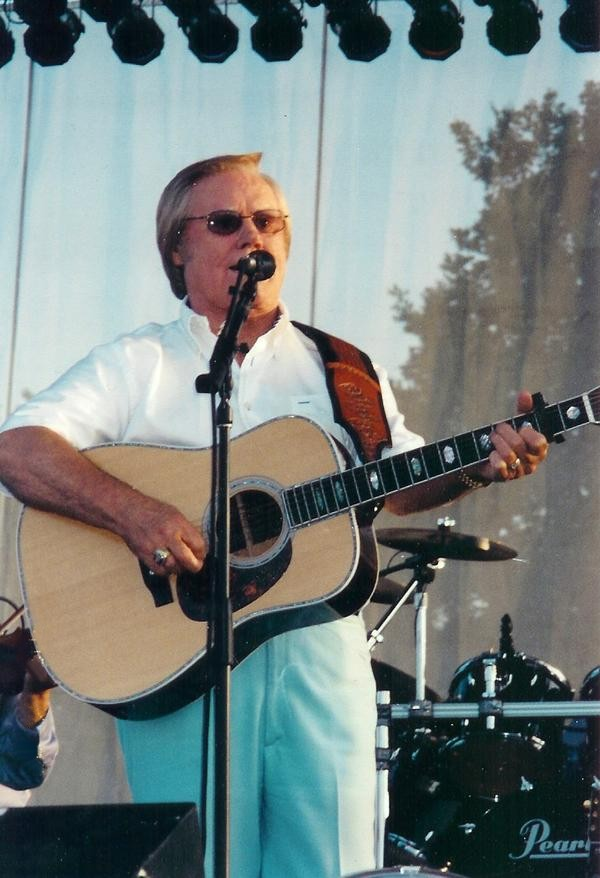
George Jones had his first number one in 1959.

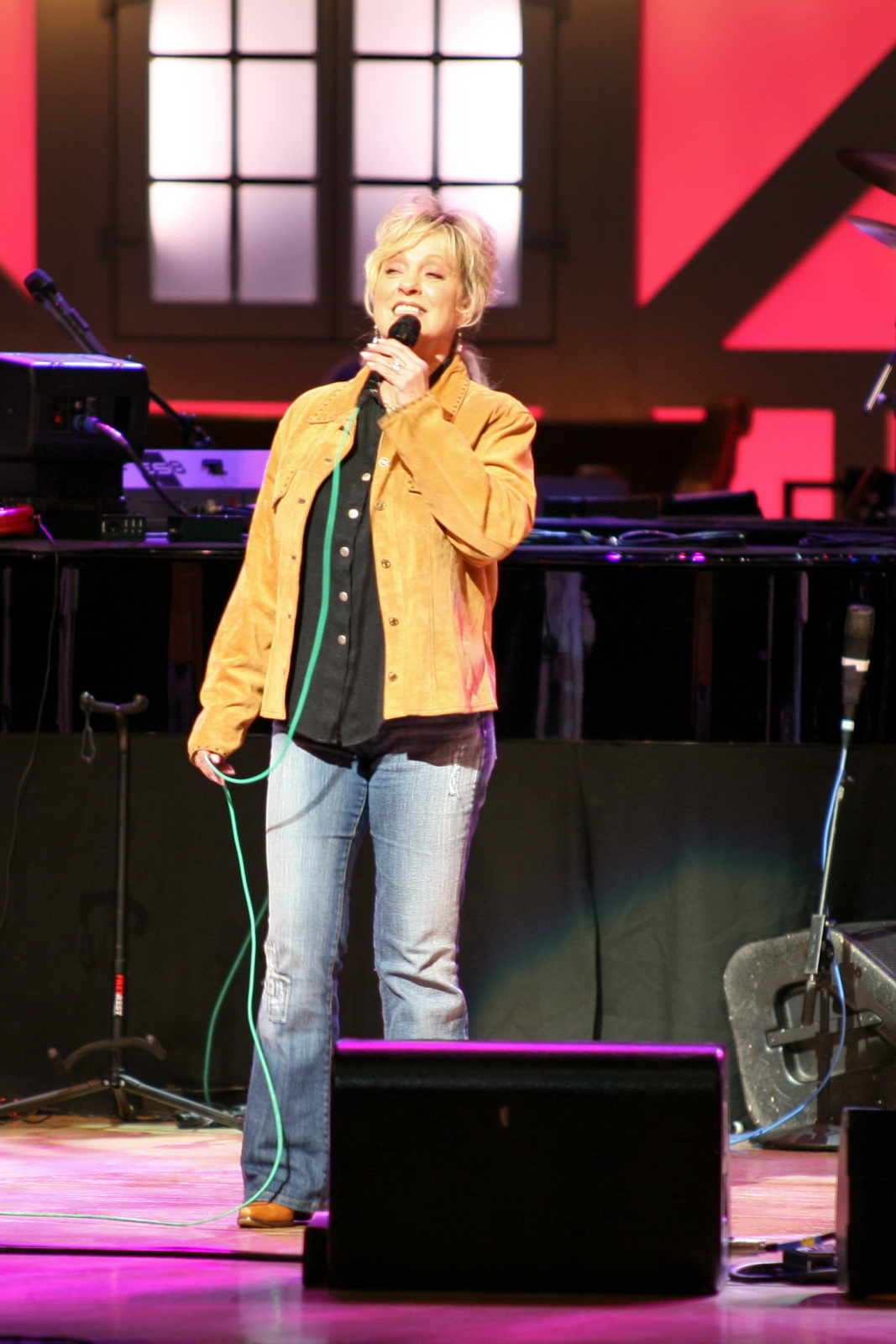
Connie Smith held the record for the longest run at number one by a female artist for nearly 50 years.

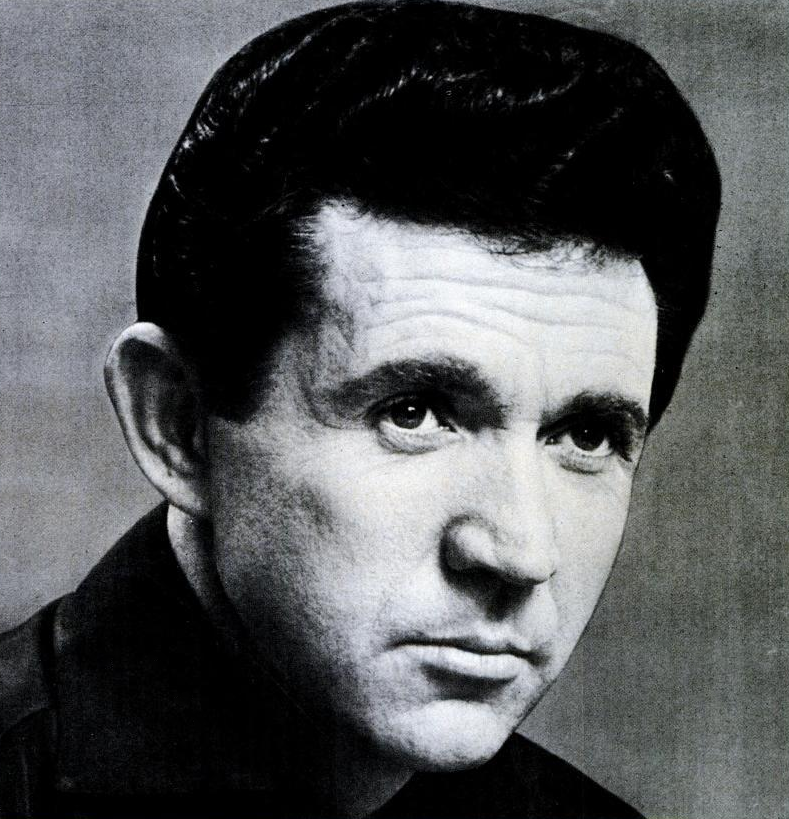
Sonny James achieved 16 consecutive number ones in the late 1960s and early 1970s.

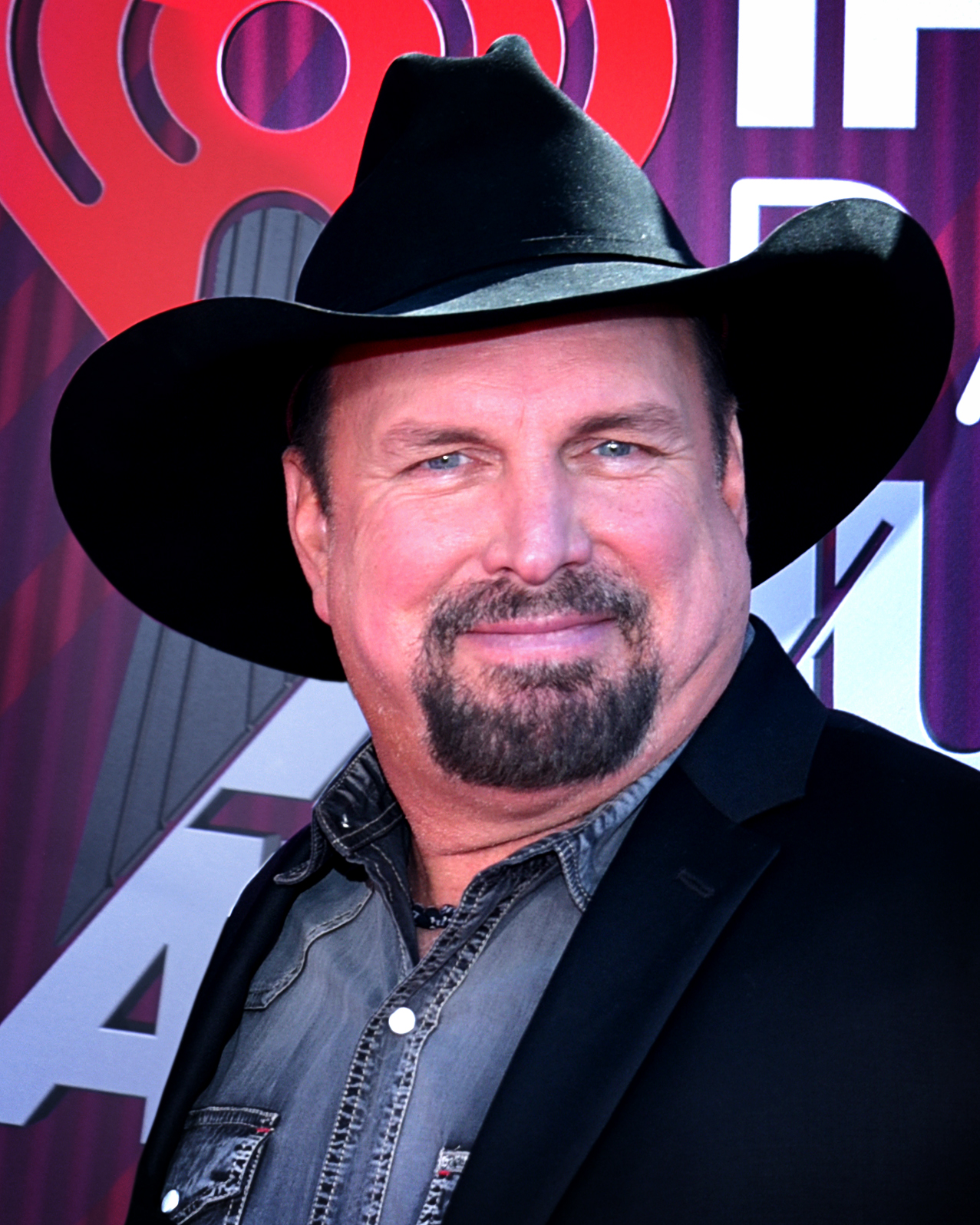
"More Than a Memory" by Garth Brooks was the first song to debut at number one in the history of Billboard's country charts.

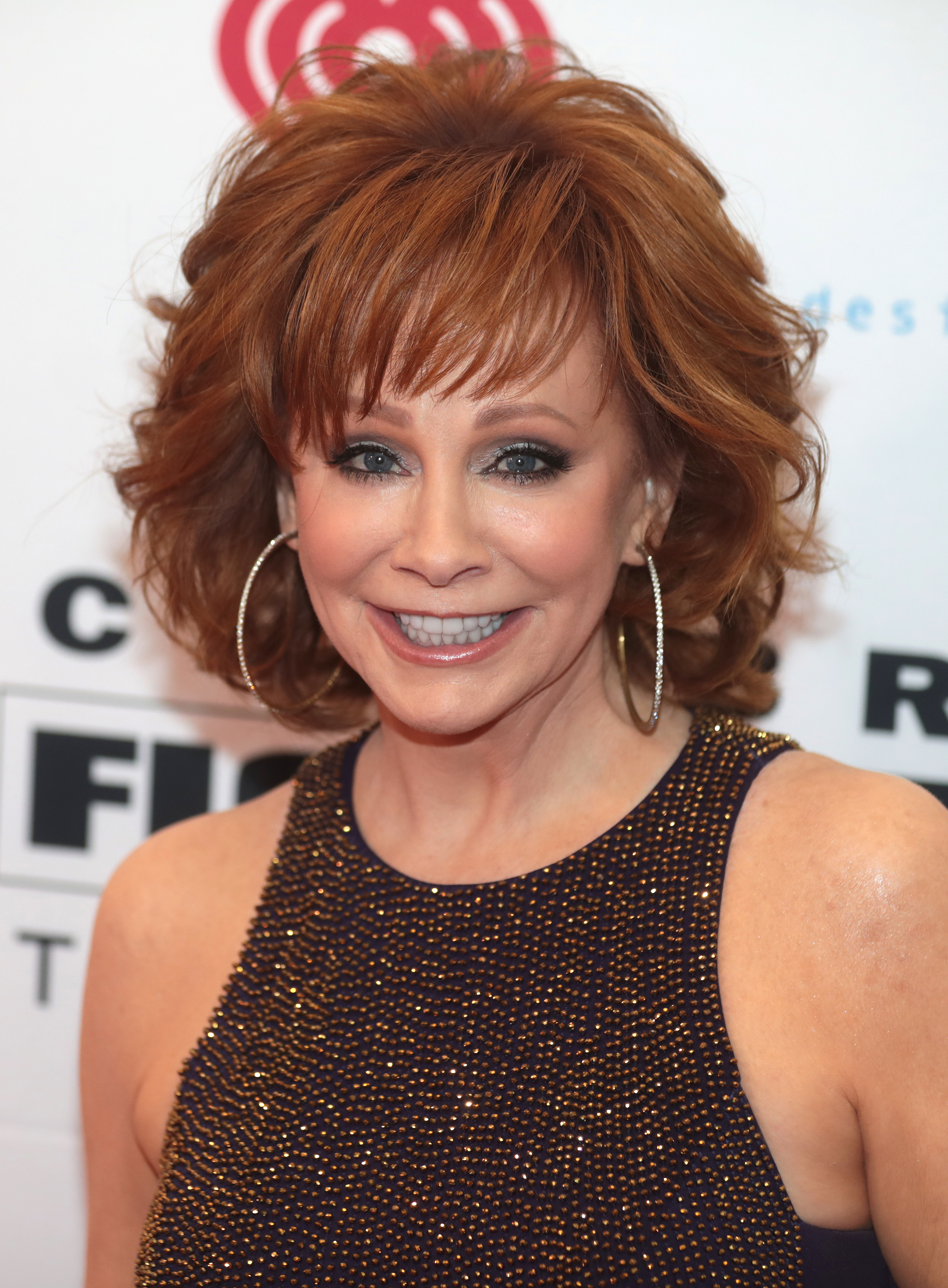
Reba McEntire spent time at number one in four different decades.

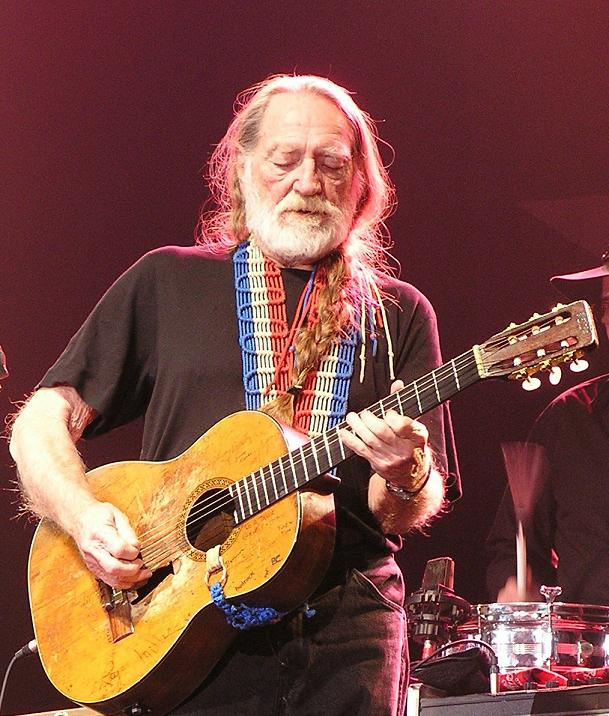
Willie Nelson set a record in 2003 as the oldest artist to gain a country number one.

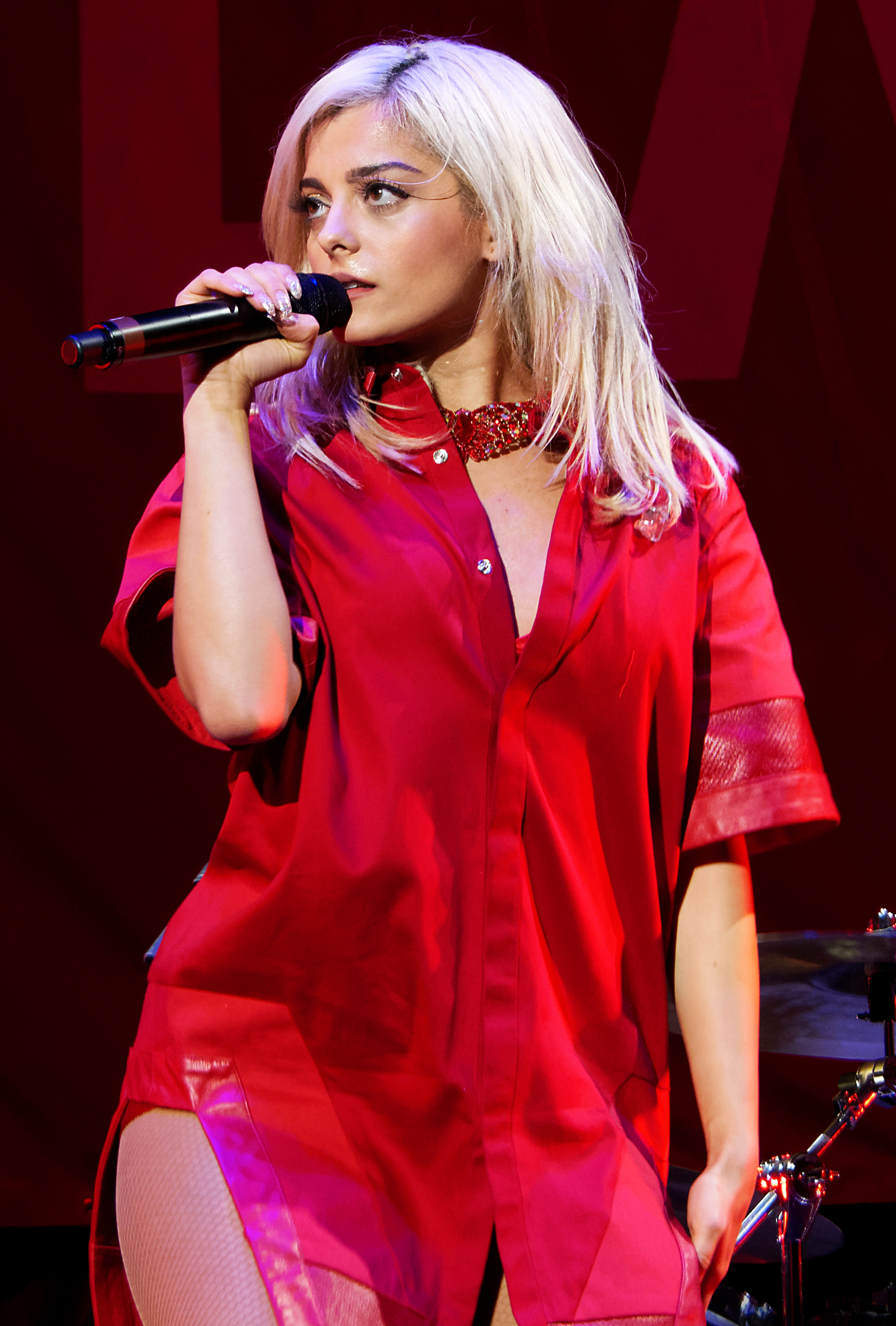
Bebe Rexha's "Meant to Be", a collaboration with Florida Georgia Line, spent 50 consecutive weeks at number one in 2017 and 2018.

Chart history
Year	Notes	Ref(s).
1944	Billboard launches the Most Played Juke Box Folk Records chart, its first country music chart, in the issue dated January 8; the first number one is "Pistol Packin' Mama", up to four different recordings of which are bracketed together and treated as one entry.	
1945	Western swing star Bob Wills tops the chart with "Smoke on the Water"; as this had already been a number one for Red Foley the previous year, it is the first song to be a country number one for two different acts since Billboard dropped its brief initial policy of treating multiple recordings of a song as one entry.	
1946	"Guitar Polka" by Al Dexter and "New Spanish Two Step" by Bob Wills each spend 16 weeks at number one, the longest chart-topping runs to date.	
1947	The chart's title changes to Most Played Juke Box Hillbilly Records for nine weeks before reverting to Most Played Juke Box Folk Records.	
1948	The Best Selling Retail Folk Records is first published in addition to the Juke Box chart. Eddy Arnold dominates the top of both charts, spending almost the entire year atop both charts. His song "I'll Hold You in My Heart (Till I Can Hold You in My Arms)" ends a run of 21 non-consecutive weeks at number one on the juke box chart, a new record for the longest-running number one country song.	
1949	Billboard changes its terminology, referring to the genre as country and western rather than folk music, and changing the chart titles to Most-Played Juke Box (Country & Western) Records and Best-Selling Retail Folk (Country & Western) Records. Country & Western Records Most Played By Folk Disk Jockeys first published in December in addition to the two existing charts. Hank Williams, regarded as one of the most important singers and songwriters in the history of country music, gains his first number one.	
1950	Lefty Frizzell, one of the most influential artists in the transition of country music to mainstream acceptance, reaches number one for the first time.	
1951	Canadian singer Hank Snow ends a run of 21 non-consecutive weeks at number one on the best sellers chart with "I'm Movin' On", tying the record for the longest-running number one country song.	
1952	The genre description is removed from the titles of the individual charts and instead shown as an overall page title; charts are thus shown as Most Played in Juke Boxes, National Best Sellers, and Most Played By Jockeys.	
1953	Hank Williams dies on January 1 while at number one on both the best sellers and jockeys charts with "Jambalaya (On the Bayou)"; his songs go on to achieve four further number ones during the year.	
1954	The National Best Sellers chart is renamed Best Sellers in Stores. Hank Snow spends 20 consecutive weeks at number one on that chart with "I Don't Hurt Anymore", a new record for the longest unbroken run atop any of the charts.	
1955	Webb Pierce tops the juke box chart for 21 weeks with his version of the early 20th century song "In the Jailhouse Now", tying the record for the longest-running number one country song.	
1956	The genre description returns to the actual chart titles, which thus become Most Played C&W in Juke Boxes, C&W Best Sellers in Stores, and Most Played C&W By Jockeys. Elvis Presley, the "King of Rock and Roll" and the most successful and influential recording artist of all time, achieves several country number ones with his early rockabilly style.	
1957	The Juke Box chart is discontinued.	
1958	The Best Sellers and Jockeys charts are both discontinued and replaced with the combined Hot C&W Sides listing.	
1959	George Jones, one of country's most successful artists with over 150 charting songs, tops the chart for the first time.	
1960	Songs produced by Chet Atkins occupy the number-one position for 28 consecutive weeks; Atkins is seen as the originator of the "Nashville Sound", a new style of country music that eschewed elements of the earlier honky-tonk style in favour of smooth productions that had a broader appeal.	
1961	"Walk On By" by Leroy Van Dyke spends the first of 19 non-consecutive weeks at number one, a record for the combined chart that will stand for more than 50 years.	
1962	The Hot C&W Sides chart is renamed Hot Country Singles.	
1963	"Love's Gonna Live Here" by Buck Owens begins a run of 16 consecutive weeks at number one, a record that will stand until 2013.	
1964	Jim Reeves gains the first of six posthumous number ones in August, a month after his death in a plane crash.	
1965	"Once a Day" by Connie Smith completes a run of eight consecutive weeks atop the chart, a new record for a female artist.	
1966	David Houston spends nine consecutive weeks at number one with "Almost Persuaded". The next unbroken run at number one of this length will not occur until 2012.	
1967	Two of country music's most successful female vocalists of all time, Tammy Wynette and Loretta Lynn, both reach number one for the first time.	
1968	"Then You Can Tell Me Goodbye" is Eddy Arnold's 28th and final number one, a record that will stand for more than ten years. It is displaced from the top spot by "Next in Line", the first number one for Conway Twitty, who will go on to break Arnold's record in 1980.	
1969	Charley Pride, the first African-American performer to become a superstar in the country music genre, reaches number one for the first time.	
1970	Hank Williams Jr, who will eventually move on from simply imitating the style of his famous father to become one of the most successful artists in country music history, reaches number one for the first time.	
1971	Dolly Parton, the most successful female country performer of all time, achieves her first number one. Sonny James achieves a record 16th consecutive number one with "Here Comes Honey Again".	
1972		
1973	Marie Osmond becomes the youngest female artist to top the chart at age 14.	
1974	Future Country Music Hall of Fame inductees Ronnie Milsap, Waylon Jennings and Bobby Bare all reach number one for the first time.	
1975	The prevalence of country-pop crossover artists such as Glen Campbell and John Denver means that many songs top both the country chart and the all-genre Hot 100.	
1976	Country Music Hall of Fame inductee Johnny Cash achieves his final solo number one.	
1977	Waylon Jennings has the longest-running number one for ten years, spending six weeks at the top with "Luckenbach, Texas (Back to the Basics of Love)". Elvis Presley reaches number one with the last single released in his lifetime.	
1978	Several number ones are by acts linked to the so-called outlaw country subgenre, which had emerged as a more hard-edged alternative to the smooth pop-country style that had dominated earlier in the decade.	
1979		
1980	Conway Twitty gains his 29th number one, surpassing Eddy Arnold's record. Three songs from the soundtrack of the film Urban Cowboy, which captures the current mainstream popularity of country music, top the chart.	
1981		
1982	Dolly Parton becomes the first artist to top the chart with two different recordings of the same song when she reaches number one with a new version of "I Will Always Love You", originally a chart-topper in 1974.	
1983	Reba McEntire achieves the first of 25 number ones.	
1984		
1985	Billboard recognizes the band Alabama as having achieved a record-breaking 17th consecutive number one, although this is dependent on disregarding a Christmas single that peaked only at number 35.	
1986	Conway Twitty achieves his 40th and final number one, a record that will stand for 20 years.	
1987		
1988	Merle Haggard achieves his 38th and final number one, the second-highest tally for an artist at this point.	
1989	Garth Brooks, one of the biggest-selling country artists of all time, reaches number one for the first time. Keith Whitley achieves the first of two posthumous number ones in September, four months after his death.	
1990	The Hot Country Songs chart methodology changes to use only airplay on country music radio stations; the chart is renamed Hot Country Singles & Tracks.	
1991		
1992		
1993		
1994		
1995	Canadian singer Shania Twain, who would go on to become one of the biggest-selling singers of any genre, gains her first country number one with "Any Man of Mine".	
1996		
1997		
1998	Four female acts top the chart for the first time, highlighting a resurgence in success for female artists in the country field.	
1999	Lonestar spends eight consecutive weeks at number one with "Amazed", the longest unbroken run in the top spot since 1966.	
2000	At age 61, Kenny Rogers becomes the oldest artist to achieve a number one country song.	
2001	Blake Shelton ties the record held by Billy Ray Cyrus for the longest run at number one by an artist's debut single since the chart began using country airplay data in 1990.	
2002		
2003	Willie Nelson sets a new record as the oldest artist to achieve a number one country song at age 70.	
2004		
2005	The chart's name changes to Hot Country Songs. Josh Gracin becomes the first American Idol finalist to achieve a country number one.	
2006	George Strait achieves his 41st number one, breaking Conway Twitty's record. Carrie Underwood, winner of the fourth season of American Idol, achieves the first of many country number ones.	
2007	"More Than a Memory" by Garth Brooks is the first song in the history of Billboard's country charts to debut at number one.	
2008	Darius Rucker is the first African-American artist to achieve a country number one for 25 years.	
2009		
2010	Reba McEntire, who first reached number one in 1983 and has been a regular in the top spot ever since, achieves the feat of having topped the chart in four different decades.	
2011	Reba McEntire gains the 25th number one of her career, tying the record for the highest number of chart-toppers by a female artist held by Dolly Parton.	
2012	The Hot Country Songs chart methodology changes to use airplay from stations of all formats as well as sales and streaming. A separate Country Airplay chart is launched using only airplay on country music stations. Taylor Swift's "We Are Never Ever Getting Back Together" breaks the record for the longest run at number one by a solo female artist, which has stood since 1965.	
2013	"Cruise" by Florida Georgia Line sets a new record as Billboard's longest-running country number one, finishing with 24 weeks in the top spot. The duo's success highlights the emergence of bro-country, a sub-genre incorporating elements from hip hop music and favoring lyrics about partying, drinking, and attractive young women.	
2014		
2015	Craig Wayne Boyd enters the Hot Country Songs chart at number one with "My Baby's Got a Smile on Her Face" after winning season 7 of reality TV singing competition The Voice.	
2016	"Forever Country", a one-off collaboration between 30 country stars from various eras released to mark the 50th Annual Country Music Association Awards, tops the chart.	
2017	"Body Like a Back Road" by Sam Hunt spends a record-breaking 34 consecutive weeks at number one on the Hot Country Songs chart.	
2018	"Meant to Be", a collaboration between pop singer Bebe Rexha and Florida Georgia Line, breaks Hunt's record and goes on to spend 50 consecutive weeks at number one on Hot Country Songs.	
2019	Luke Combs achieves his sixth Country Airplay number one with his sixth charting single, a new record for the best start to an artist's career on a listing based on country music radio airplay. "Old Town Road" by Lil Nas X misses out on reaching number one on Hot Country Songs when it is controversially removed from the chart for not being sufficiently representative of the genre.	
2020	"The Bones" by Maren Morris becomes the longest-running number one by a female solo artist on the Hot Country Songs chart in May. Gabby Barrett in turn breaks the record with "I Hope" in December.	
2021	Taylor Swift enters the Hot Country Songs chart at number one with a re-recorded version of her 2008 song "Love Story", making her the second artist to reach number one with two recordings of the same song.	
2022	Michael Ray's song "Whiskey and Rain" ties the record for the slowest climb to number one on Country Airplay at 65 weeks, a record previously set by Travis Denning's "After a Few" in June 2020. Morgan Wallen's "You Proof" sets a new record for the longest-running number one single based on country radio airplay since Billboard began publishing such a chart in 1990.	
2023	Morgan Wallen's "Last Night" is the first song by a male solo country singer to top the Hot 100 for more than 40 years. Luke Combs tops the Country Airplay chart with "Fast Car"; written and originally recorded by Tracy Chapman, it is the first country number written solely by a black woman.	
2024	Nate Smith's "World on Fire" spends a tenth week at number one on Country Airplay, tying the record for the longest-running chart-topper based solely off country radio plays. Beyoncé becomes the first African-American female artist to achieve a chart-topper in the country genre when "Texas Hold 'Em" tops Hot Country Songs.	
2025	"A Bar Song (Tipsy)" by Shaboozey becomes the second-longest running Hot Country Songs number one of all time and the longest-running by a single artist when it spends its 35th week at number one.	
2026	Ella Langley's "Choosin' Texas" dominates both the country and pop charts. It sets a new record for the longest-running Hot 100 number of all time, and as of mid-November has topped the Hot Country Songs listing for 48 weeks.	

== See also ==
- List of artists who reached number one on the U.S. Hot Country chart
- List of Billboard number-one country albums
