= List of Billboard number-one country songs of 1955 =

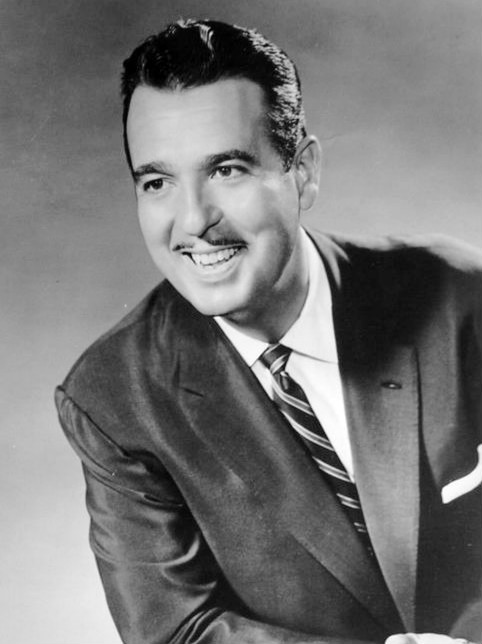
Tennessee Ernie Ford's song "Sixteen Tons" ended the year at number one on two of the three charts.

In 1955, Billboard magazine published three charts covering the best-performing country music songs in the United States: Most Played in Juke Boxes, Best Sellers in Stores, and Most Played By Jockeys. The juke box chart was based on a "survey among operators thruout [sic] the country using a high proportion of country and western records", the best sellers chart on a survey of "dealers...with a high volume of country and western records" and the jockeys chart a survey of "top disk jockeys in all key markets". All three charts are considered part of the lineage of the magazine's current country music songs charts.

As in the previous year, the number one position on all three charts was dominated during 1955 by Webb Pierce, the most successful country singer of the mid-1950s. His rendition of "In the Jailhouse Now", an early 20th-century song most associated in the country music field with 1920s country pioneer Jimmie Rodgers, spent 21 weeks at number one on the juke box chart beginning in March. This run tied the record held by Eddy Arnold's "I'll Hold You in My Heart (Till I Can Hold You in My Arms)" (1947–48) and Hank Snow's "I'm Moving On" (1950) for the most weeks spent atop one of Billboard's country charts. The three songs would share the record for more than fifty years until Florida Georgia Line spent a 22nd week at number one on the Hot Country Songs listing in 2013 with "Cruise". "In the Jailhouse Now" was also the longest-running chart-topper of 1955 on both the best sellers and jockeys charts, spending 20 weeks and 15 weeks respectively in the top spot. Pierce's grip on the number one position was strongest on the juke box chart, on which he spent 47 weeks at number one, including one week when he tied for the top spot. Carl Smith (four weeks, including one tied with Pierce), Eddy Arnold (two weeks) and Tennessee Ernie Ford (one week) were the only other artists to top that listing in issues of Billboard with a cover date of 1955.

The same four artists were also the only ones to top the best sellers chart, but three other acts reached number one on the jockeys chart, including two who achieved their first chart-toppers in 1955. Faron Young reached number one for the first time in June with "Live Fast, Love Hard, Die Young", which spent three weeks topping the listing. The song was replaced in the top spot by "A Satisfied Mind" by Porter Wagoner, which was similarly the first appearance at number one for the singer. The third artist to top only the jockeys chart was Hank Snow, who reached number one on the airplay-based listing with "Let Me Go, Lover!" The final number one of the year on both the juke box and best sellers charts was Tennessee Ernie Ford's "Sixteen Tons", which also crossed over to top the magazine's pop charts. The last jockeys chart of 1955 had Pierce at number one with "Love, Love, Love".

== Chart history ==
Beginning with the April 9 issue, Billboard listed both sides of a single jointly at number one on the Best Sellers and Juke Box charts if "significant action [was] reported on both sides of a record". It did not indicate that the single was officially released or promoted as a double A-side.

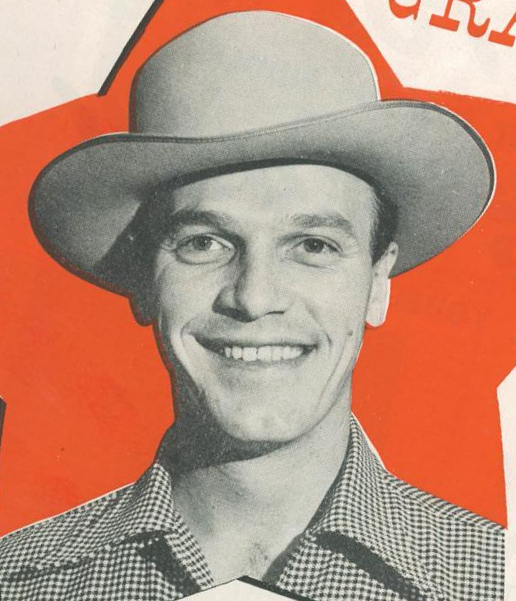
Eddy Arnold ended Webb Pierce's eight-month occupation of the number one position on the juke box chart.

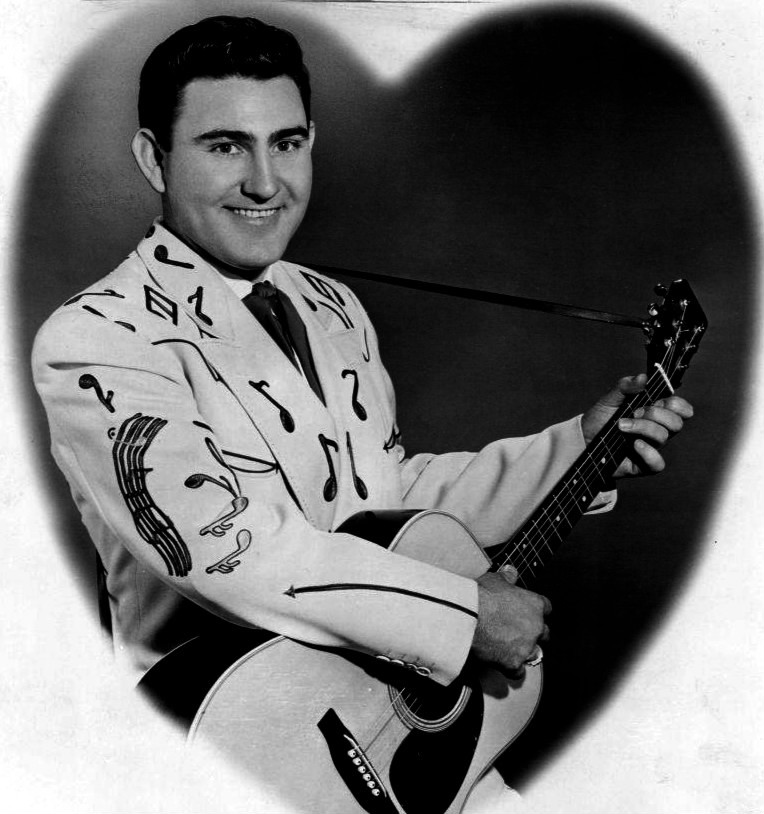
Webb Pierce held the number one position on the best sellers chart from February to October.

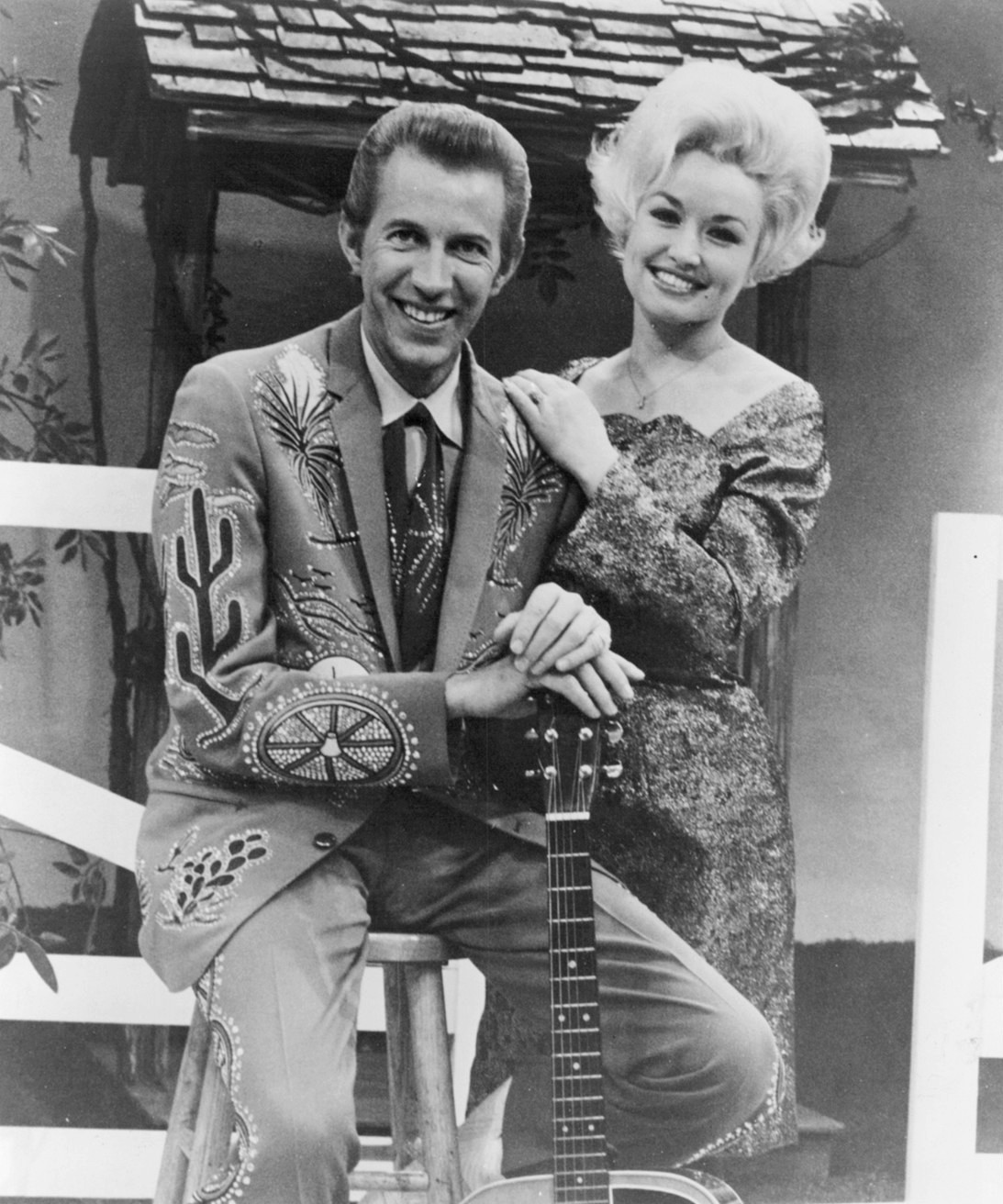
Porter Wagoner (pictured with Dolly Parton) had his first number one in 1955.

Chart history
Issue date	Juke Box		Best Sellers		Jockeys		Ref.
Issue date	Title	Artist(s)	Title	Artist(s)	Title	Artist(s)	Ref.
January 1	"More And More"	Webb Pierce	"More And More"	Webb Pierce	"More And More"	Webb Pierce	
January 8	"More And More"	Webb Pierce	"Loose Talk"	Carl Smith	"Loose Talk"	Carl Smith	
January 15	"More And More"	Webb Pierce	"Loose Talk"	Carl Smith	"Loose Talk"	Carl Smith	
January 22^{[a]}	"More And More"	Webb Pierce	"Loose Talk"	Carl Smith	"Loose Talk"	Carl Smith	
January 22^{[a]}	"Loose Talk"	Carl Smith	"Loose Talk"	Carl Smith	"Loose Talk"	Carl Smith	
January 29	"Loose Talk"	Carl Smith	"Loose Talk"	Carl Smith	"Let Me Go, Lover!"	Hank Snow	
February 5	"Loose Talk"	Carl Smith	"Loose Talk"	Carl Smith	"Let Me Go, Lover!"	Hank Snow	
February 12	"Loose Talk"	Carl Smith	"Loose Talk"	Carl Smith	"Loose Talk"	Carl Smith	
February 19	"More And More"	Webb Pierce	"Loose Talk"	Carl Smith	"Loose Talk"	Carl Smith	
February 26	"More And More"	Webb Pierce	"In the Jailhouse Now"	Webb Pierce	"Loose Talk"	Carl Smith	
March 5	"In the Jailhouse Now"^{[b]}	Webb Pierce	"In the Jailhouse Now"	Webb Pierce	"In the Jailhouse Now"	Webb Pierce	
March 12	"In the Jailhouse Now"^{[b]}	Webb Pierce	"In the Jailhouse Now"	Webb Pierce	"In the Jailhouse Now"	Webb Pierce	
March 19	"In the Jailhouse Now"^{[b]}	Webb Pierce	"In the Jailhouse Now"	Webb Pierce	"In the Jailhouse Now"	Webb Pierce	
March 26	"In the Jailhouse Now"^{[b]}	Webb Pierce	"In the Jailhouse Now"	Webb Pierce	"In the Jailhouse Now"	Webb Pierce	
April 2	"In the Jailhouse Now"^{[b]}	Webb Pierce	"In the Jailhouse Now"	Webb Pierce	"In the Jailhouse Now"	Webb Pierce	
April 9	"In the Jailhouse Now"^{[b]}	Webb Pierce	"In the Jailhouse Now"	Webb Pierce	"In the Jailhouse Now"	Webb Pierce	
April 16	"In the Jailhouse Now"^{[b]}	Webb Pierce	"In the Jailhouse Now"	Webb Pierce	"In the Jailhouse Now"	Webb Pierce	
April 23	"In the Jailhouse Now"^{[b]}	Webb Pierce	"In the Jailhouse Now"	Webb Pierce	"In the Jailhouse Now"	Webb Pierce	
April 30	"In the Jailhouse Now"^{[b]}	Webb Pierce	"In the Jailhouse Now"	Webb Pierce	"In the Jailhouse Now"	Webb Pierce	
May 7	"In the Jailhouse Now"^{[b]}	Webb Pierce	"In the Jailhouse Now"	Webb Pierce	"In the Jailhouse Now"	Webb Pierce	
May 14	"In the Jailhouse Now"^{[b]}	Webb Pierce	"In the Jailhouse Now"	Webb Pierce	"In the Jailhouse Now"	Webb Pierce	
May 21	"In the Jailhouse Now"^{[b]}	Webb Pierce	"In the Jailhouse Now"	Webb Pierce	"In the Jailhouse Now"	Webb Pierce	
May 28	"In the Jailhouse Now"^{[b]}	Webb Pierce	"In the Jailhouse Now"	Webb Pierce	"In the Jailhouse Now"	Webb Pierce	
June 4	"In the Jailhouse Now"^{[b]}	Webb Pierce	"In the Jailhouse Now"	Webb Pierce	"In the Jailhouse Now"	Webb Pierce	
June 11	"In the Jailhouse Now"^{[b]}	Webb Pierce	"In the Jailhouse Now"	Webb Pierce	"In the Jailhouse Now"	Webb Pierce	
June 18	"In the Jailhouse Now"^{[b]}	Webb Pierce	"In the Jailhouse Now"	Webb Pierce	"Live Fast, Love Hard, Die Young"	Faron Young	
June 25	"In the Jailhouse Now"^{[b]}	Webb Pierce	"In the Jailhouse Now"	Webb Pierce	"Live Fast, Love Hard, Die Young"	Faron Young	
July 2	"In the Jailhouse Now"^{[b]}	Webb Pierce	"In the Jailhouse Now"	Webb Pierce	"Live Fast, Love Hard, Die Young"	Faron Young	
July 9	"In the Jailhouse Now"^{[b]}	Webb Pierce	"In the Jailhouse Now"	Webb Pierce	"A Satisfied Mind"	Porter Wagoner	
July 16	"In the Jailhouse Now"^{[b]}	Webb Pierce	"I Don't Care"^{[c]}	Webb Pierce	"A Satisfied Mind"	Porter Wagoner	
July 23	"In the Jailhouse Now"^{[b]}	Webb Pierce	"I Don't Care"^{[c]}	Webb Pierce	"A Satisfied Mind"	Porter Wagoner	
July 30	"I Don't Care"^{[d]}	Webb Pierce	"I Don't Care"^{[c]}	Webb Pierce	"A Satisfied Mind"	Porter Wagoner	
August 6	"I Don't Care"^{[d]}	Webb Pierce	"I Don't Care"^{[c]}	Webb Pierce	"I Don't Care"	Webb Pierce	
August 13	"I Don't Care"^{[d]}	Webb Pierce	"I Don't Care"^{[c]}	Webb Pierce	"I Don't Care"	Webb Pierce	
August 20	"I Don't Care"^{[d]}	Webb Pierce	"I Don't Care"^{[c]}	Webb Pierce	"I Don't Care"	Webb Pierce	
August 27	"I Don't Care"^{[d]}	Webb Pierce	"I Don't Care"^{[c]}	Webb Pierce	"I Don't Care"	Webb Pierce	
September 3	"I Don't Care"^{[d]}	Webb Pierce	"I Don't Care"^{[c]}	Webb Pierce	"I Don't Care"	Webb Pierce	
September 10	"I Don't Care"^{[d]}	Webb Pierce	"I Don't Care"^{[c]}	Webb Pierce	"I Don't Care"	Webb Pierce	
September 17	"I Don't Care"^{[d]}	Webb Pierce	"I Don't Care"^{[c]}	Webb Pierce	"I Don't Care"	Webb Pierce	
September 24	"I Don't Care"^{[d]}	Webb Pierce	"I Don't Care"^{[c]}	Webb Pierce	"I Don't Care"	Webb Pierce	
October 1	"I Don't Care"^{[d]}	Webb Pierce	"I Don't Care"^{[c]}	Webb Pierce	"I Don't Care"	Webb Pierce	
October 8	"I Don't Care"^{[d]}	Webb Pierce	"Cattle Call" / "Kentuckian Song"^{[e]}	Eddy Arnold	"I Don't Care"	Webb Pierce	
October 15	"I Don't Care"^{[d]}	Webb Pierce	"Cattle Call" / "Kentuckian Song"^{[e]}	Eddy Arnold	"I Don't Care"	Webb Pierce	
October 22	"That Do Make It Nice"^{[f]}	Eddy Arnold	"Love, Love, Love" / "If You Were Me"^{[g]}	Webb Pierce	"I Don't Care"	Webb Pierce	
October 29	"That Do Make It Nice"^{[f]}	Eddy Arnold	"Love, Love, Love" / "If You Were Me"^{[g]}	Webb Pierce	"Love, Love, Love"	Webb Pierce	
November 5	"Love, Love, Love" / "If You Were Me"^{[h]}	Webb Pierce	"Love, Love, Love" / "If You Were Me"^{[g]}	Webb Pierce	"Love, Love, Love"	Webb Pierce	
November 12	"Love, Love, Love" / "If You Were Me"^{[h]}	Webb Pierce	"Love, Love, Love" / "If You Were Me"^{[g]}	Webb Pierce	"Love, Love, Love"	Webb Pierce	
November 19	"Love, Love, Love" / "If You Were Me"^{[h]}	Webb Pierce	"Love, Love, Love" / "If You Were Me"^{[g]}	Webb Pierce	"Love, Love, Love"	Webb Pierce	
November 26	"Love, Love, Love" / "If You Were Me"^{[h]}	Webb Pierce	"Love, Love, Love" / "If You Were Me"^{[g]}	Webb Pierce	"Love, Love, Love"	Webb Pierce	
December 3	"Love, Love, Love" / "If You Were Me"^{[h]}	Webb Pierce	"Love, Love, Love" / "If You Were Me"^{[g]}	Webb Pierce	"Love, Love, Love"	Webb Pierce	
December 10	"Love, Love, Love" / "If You Were Me"^{[h]}	Webb Pierce	"Love, Love, Love" / "If You Were Me"^{[g]}	Webb Pierce	"Love, Love, Love"	Webb Pierce	
December 17	"Love, Love, Love" / "If You Were Me"^{[h]}	Webb Pierce	"Sixteen Tons"	Tennessee Ernie Ford	"Love, Love, Love"	Webb Pierce	
December 24	"Love, Love, Love" / "If You Were Me"^{[h]}	Webb Pierce	"Sixteen Tons"	Tennessee Ernie Ford	"Love, Love, Love"	Webb Pierce	
December 31	"Sixteen Tons"	Tennessee Ernie Ford	"Sixteen Tons"	Tennessee Ernie Ford	"Love, Love, Love"	Webb Pierce	

Notes

a. Two singles tied for number one on the juke box chart.
b. B-side "I'm Gonna Fall Out of Love With You" listed jointly at number one in the April 9 issue only
c. B-side "Your Good For Nothing Heart" listed jointly at number one through the issue dated August 13 only
d. B-side "Your Good For Nothing Heart" listed jointly at number one through the issue dated August 20 only
e. Both sides listed jointly at number one in both issues
f. B-side "Just Call Me Lonesome" listed jointly at number one in the October 22 issue only
g. "If You Were Me" not listed jointly at number one in the November 12 issue
h. "If You Were Me" not listed jointly at number one in the December 3 issue

== See also ==
- 1955 in music
- 1955 in country music
- List of artists who reached number one on the U.S. country chart
