= Texarkana Baby =

Texarkana Baby can refer to:

- "Texarkana Baby (song)" A song by Fred Rose and made popular by Eddy Arnold and Bob Wills, the first 7-inch 45 rpm disc, issued by RCA in the US on 31 March 1949.
- A Piper Lance piloted around the world in 1986 by Dr. Danford A. Bookout of Texarkana
