= Just a Little Lovin' (Will Go a Long Way) =

1947 song by Eddy Arnold and Zeke Clements

"Just a Little Lovin' Will Go a Long Way"

Single by Eddy Arnold, The Tennessee Plowboy and His Guitar
- B-side: My Daddy Is Only a Picture
- Published: August 3, 1948 by Hill and Range Songs, Inc., Hollywood, Calif.
- Released: July 29, 1948
- Recorded: December 17, 1947
- Studio: RCA Victor Studio 1, 155 East 24th St., New York City
- Genre: Country
- Length: 2:33
- Label: RCA Victor 20-3013
- Songwriters: Zeke Clements, Eddy Arnold

Eddy Arnold, The Tennessee Plowboy and His Guitar singles chronology
"Bouquet of Roses / Texarkana Baby" (1948)	"Just a Little Lovin' Will Go a Long Way" (1948)	"A Heart Full of Love (For a Handful of Kisses) / Then I Turned and Walked Slowly Away" (1949)

"Just a Little Lovin' (Will Go a Long Way)" is a 1948 song written by Eddy Arnold and Zeke Clements. Eddy Arnold's recording of the song was his fifth number one in a row on the Folk Records chart, spending four non consecutive weeks on the Best Seller chart with a peak position of No. 13.

== Other recordings ==
- Bing Crosby – recorded with Grady Martin and His Slew Foot Five on March 23, 1952.
- Eddie Fisher – this reached the Billboard Best Seller charts in 1952 with a peak position. of No. 20.
- Tommy Edwards – for his album Tommy Edwards Sings Golden Country Hits (1961).
- Ray Charles – for his album Modern Sounds in Country and Western Music (1962)
- Dean Martin – included in his album Dean "Tex" Martin Rides Again (1963)

Preceded by "Bouquet of Roses" by Eddy Arnold	Best Selling Retail Folk Records number one single by Eddy Arnold; September 5, 1948	Succeeded by "One Has My Name (The Other Has My Heart)" by Jimmy Wakely
