= The Song of Robbins =

Studio album by Marty Robbins
- Released: 1957
- Genre: Country
- Label: Columbia Records

The Song of Robbins is a studio album by country music singer Marty Robbins. It was released in 1957 by Columbia Records.

In the annual poll of country music disc jockeys by Billboard magazine, The Songs of Robbins was rated No. 2 among the "Favorite C&W Albums" of 1957. It was still running strong the following year and still ranked No. 12 in the 1958 poll.

AllMusic gave the album a rating of three stars. Reviewer Jim Smith wrote that "the record achieves a nice balance of pop and honky tonk that doesn't succumb to excess."

== Track listing ==
Side A

1. "Lovesick Blues"
2. "I'm So Lonesome I Could Cry"
3. "It's Too Late to Worry Any More"
4. "Rose of Ol' Pawnee"
5. "I Never Let You Cross My Mind"
6. "I Hang My Head and Cry"

Side B

1. "You Only Want Me When You're Lonely"
2. "Moanin' the Blues"
3. "I'll Step Aside"
4. "All the World Is Lonely Now"
5. "Bouquet of Roses"
6. "Have I Told You Lately That I Love You"
