= List of Hot Country Singles & Tracks number ones of 2001 =

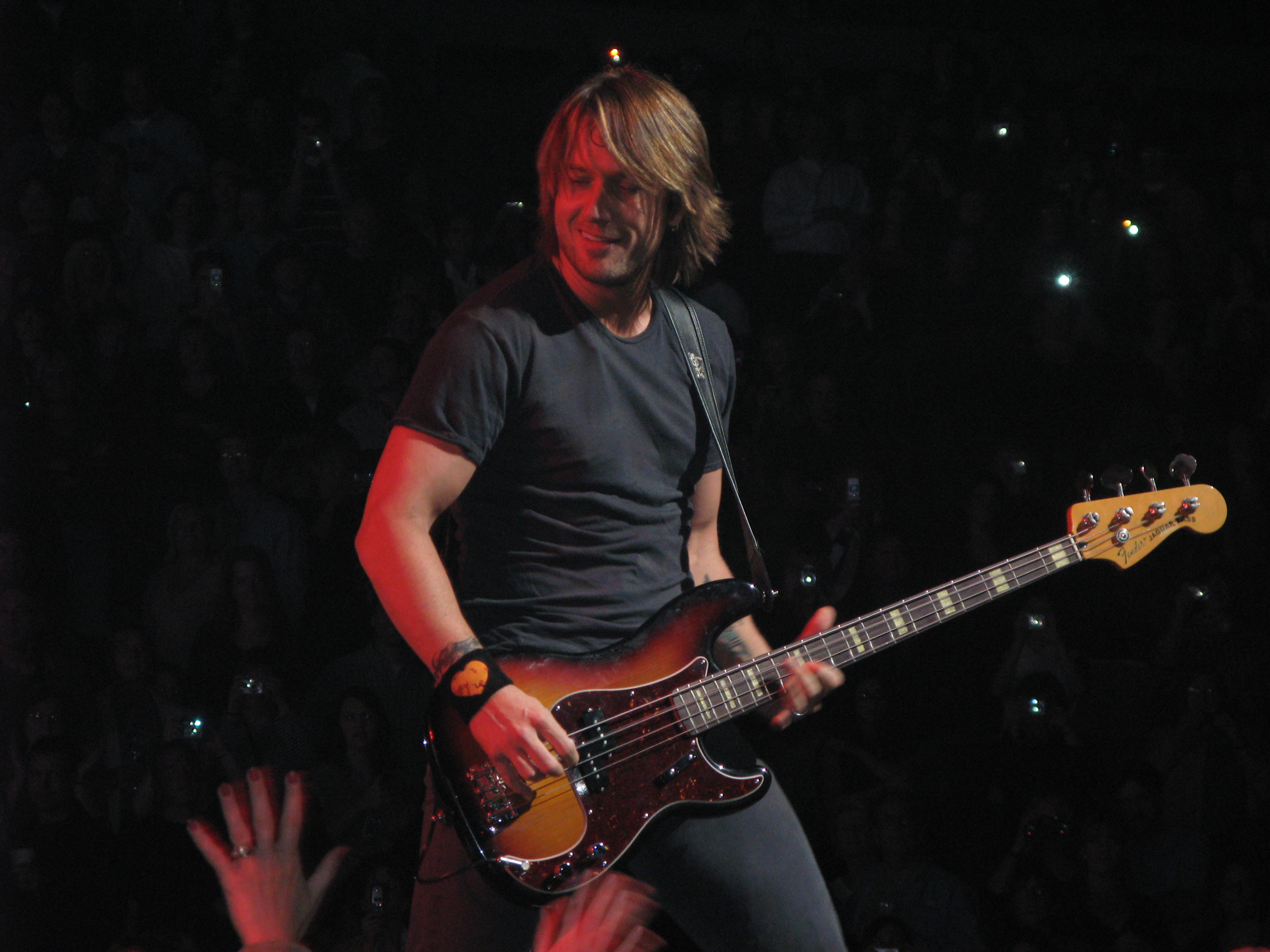
Keith Urban had his first number one in 2001.

Hot Country Songs is a chart that ranks the top-performing country music songs in the United States, published by Billboard magazine. In 2001, 22 different songs topped the chart, then published under the title Hot Country Singles & Tracks, in 52 issues of the magazine, based on weekly airplay data from country music radio stations compiled by Nielsen Broadcast Data Systems.

Singer Tim McGraw's song "My Next Thirty Years" was at number one at the start of the year, having been at the top since the issue dated December 16, 2000, and remained at number one until the issue dated January 20, when it was replaced by "Born to Fly" by Sara Evans. McGraw also topped the chart with "Grown Men Don't Cry" in June and "Angry All the Time" in November. Toby Keith also achieved three number ones in 2001, "You Shouldn't Kiss Me Like This" in March, "I'm Just Talkin' About Tonight" in September and "I Wanna Talk About Me" in November–December, and had the most weeks at number one of any act during the year, with nine. Four acts each topped the charts with two songs, groups Lonestar and Brooks & Dunn and solo artists Jamie O'Neal and Alan Jackson, the latter of whom ended the year at the top of the chart with "Where Were You (When the World Stopped Turning)". Jackson's song, written in response to the September 11 attacks and premiered at the 2001 Country Music Association Awards, reached the top spot after just six weeks on the chart, the fastest such rise for four years. It would remain at number one until the chart dated February 2 of the following year. The longest run at number one during 2001 was six weeks, achieved by two songs, "Ain't Nothing 'bout You" by Brooks & Dunn and "I'm Already There" by Lonestar. "Ain't Nothing 'bout You" was ranked number one on Billboard's year-end chart of the most popular country songs, and is the longest-running of the duo's twenty number ones.

Several artists achieved their first Hot Country Singles & Tracks number ones in 2001. Early in the year, two Australian singers, Jamie O'Neal and Keith Urban, achieved their first number ones in consecutive weeks with "There Is No Arizona" and "But for the Grace of God" respectively. Teenage vocalist Jessica Andrews made her first appearance at the top of the chart in April with "Who I Am". Later in the year Blake Shelton and Cyndi Thomson achieved their first chart-toppers with "Austin" and "What I Really Meant to Say" respectively. O'Neal, Shelton and Thomson all reached the top position in 2001 with their first charting singles, in contrast to the previous year when no artist achieved this feat. Shelton's five-week run at the top tied the record held by Billy Ray Cyrus for the longest spell at number one by an artist's debut single since Nielsen began compiling data for the chart in 1990.

== Chart history ==
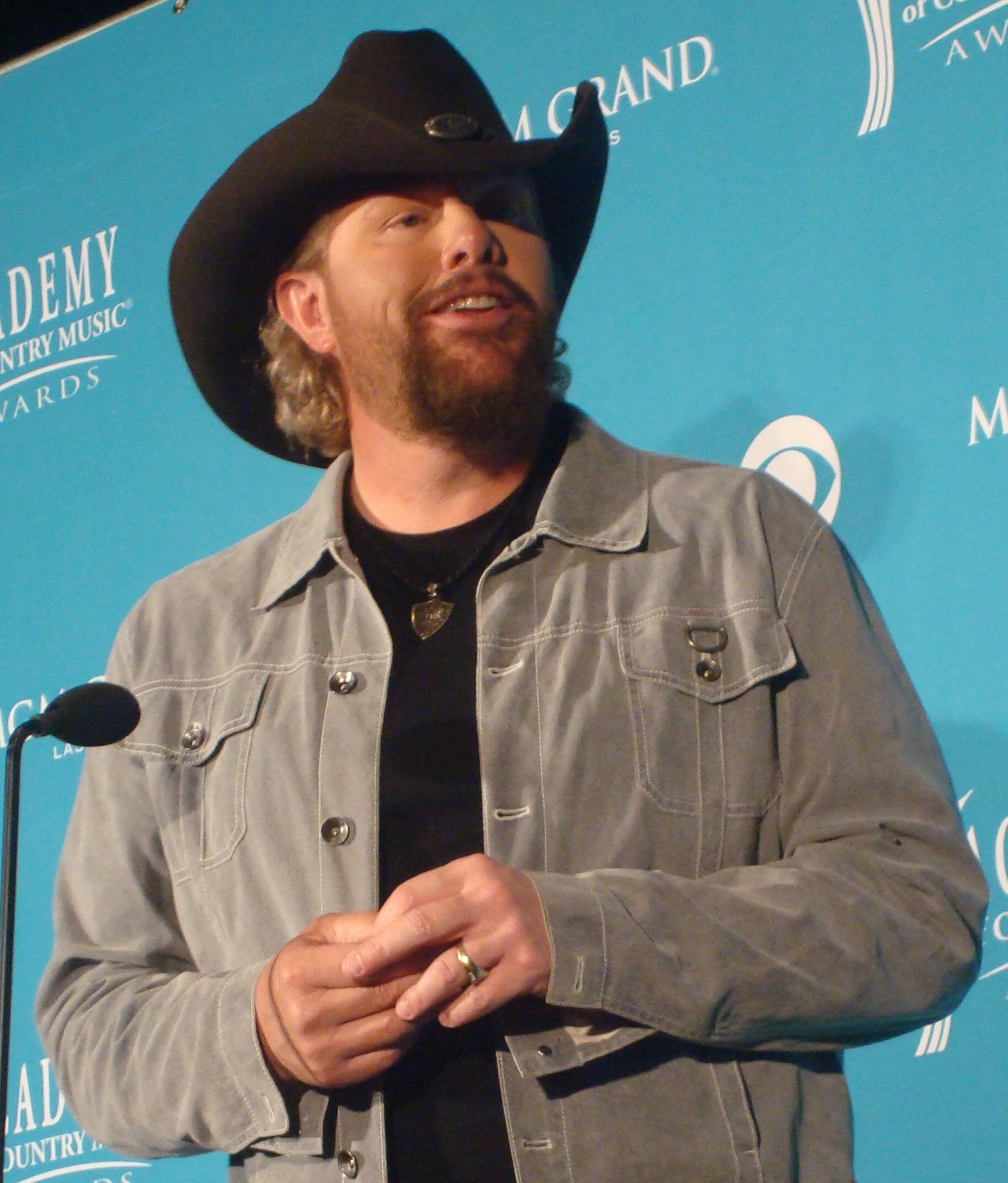
Toby Keith achieved three number ones in 2001.

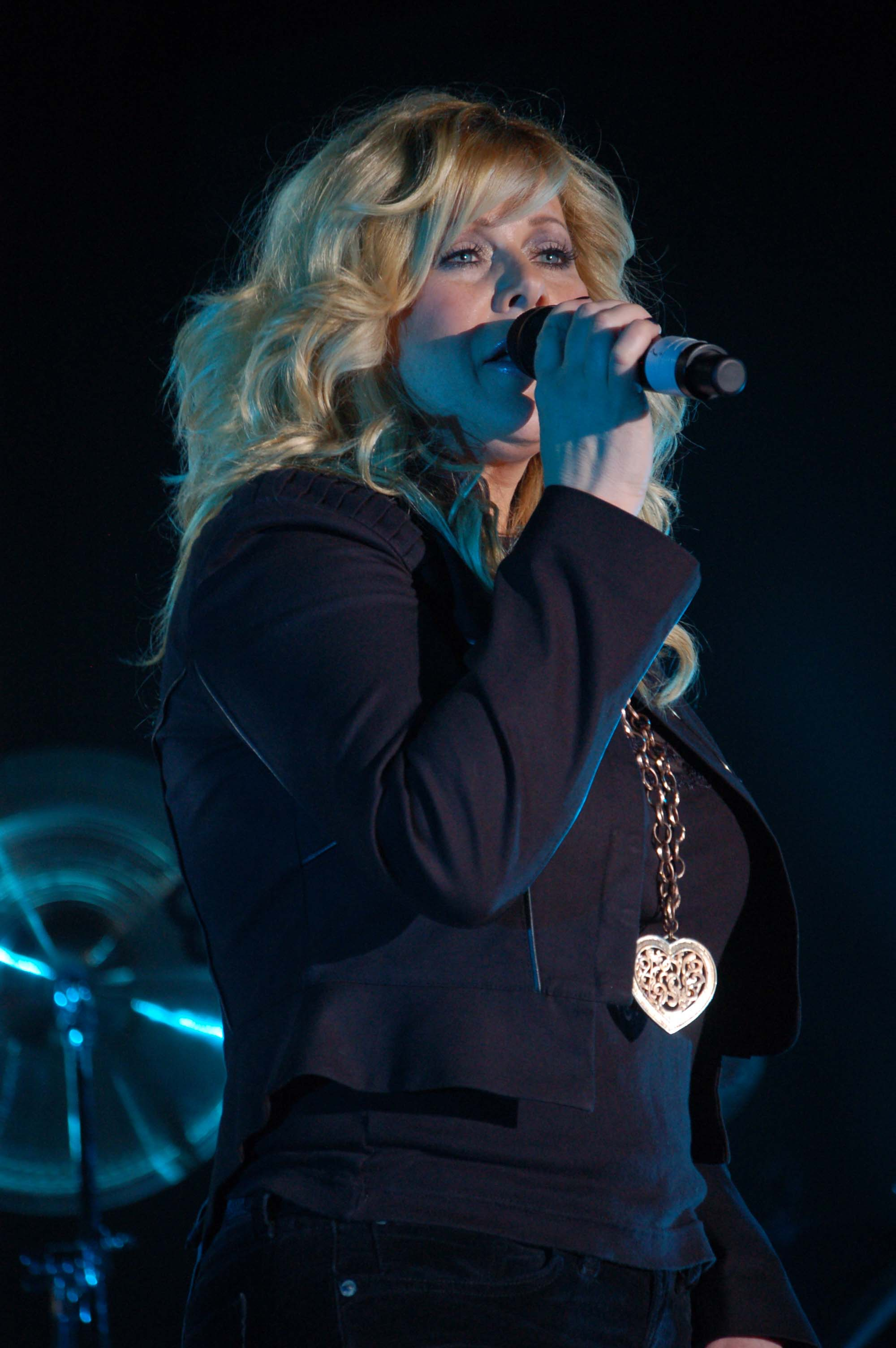
Australian singer Jamie O'Neal had her first number one in February with "There Is No Arizona" and returned to the top spot later in the year.

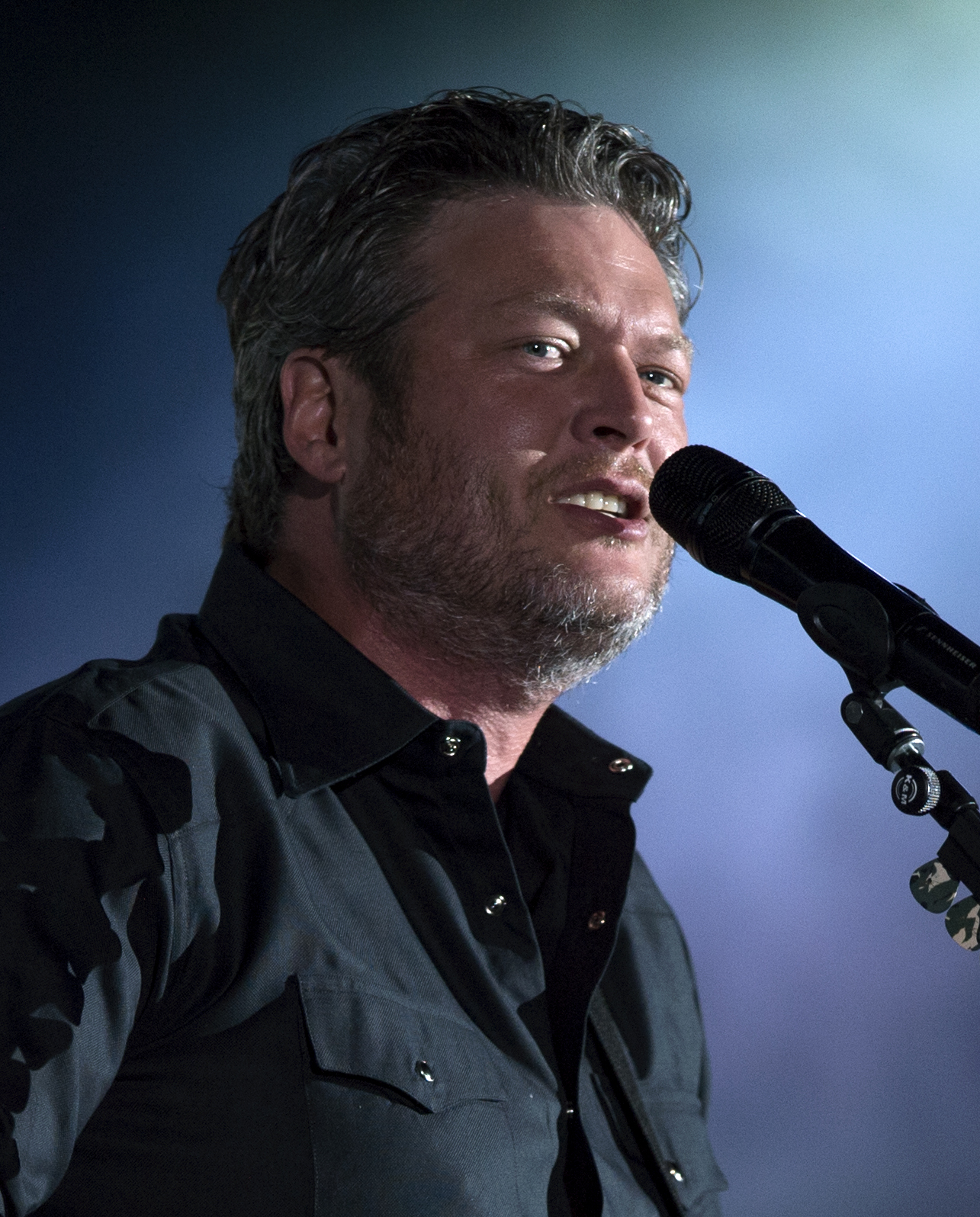
Blake Shelton spent five weeks at the top of the charts with the song "Austin".

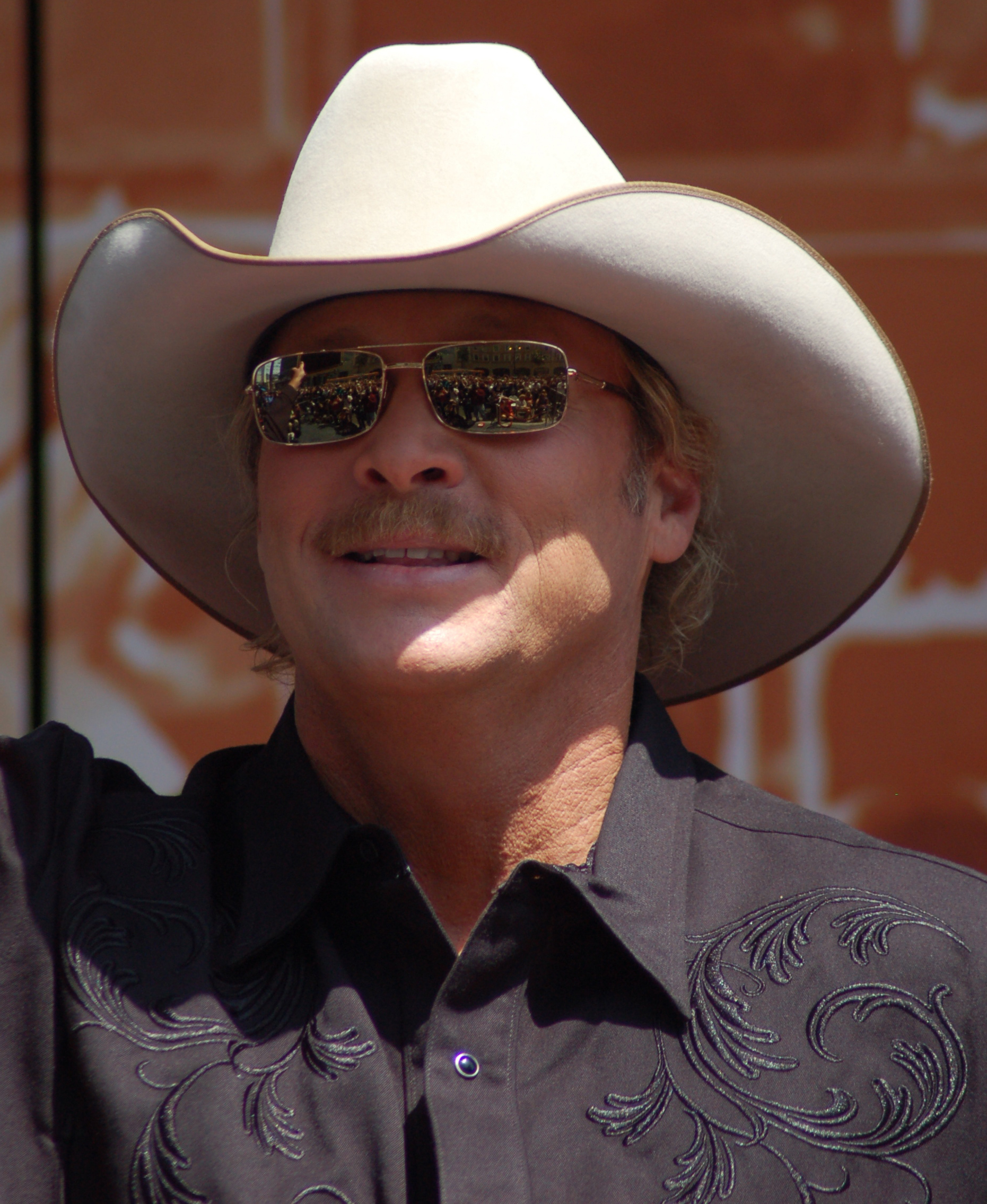
The year-end number one was "Where Were You (When the World Stopped Turning)" by Alan Jackson, a song written in response to the September 11 attacks.

Issue date	Title	Artist(s)	Ref.
January 6	"My Next Thirty Years"	Tim McGraw	
January 13	"My Next Thirty Years"	Tim McGraw	
January 20	"Born to Fly"	Sara Evans	
January 27	"Without You"	Dixie Chicks	
February 3	"Tell Her"	Lonestar	
February 10	"Tell Her"	Lonestar	
February 17	"There Is No Arizona"	Jamie O'Neal	
February 24	"But for the Grace of God"	Keith Urban	
March 3	"You Shouldn't Kiss Me Like This"	Toby Keith	
March 10	"One More Day"	Diamond Rio	
March 17	"You Shouldn't Kiss Me Like This"	Toby Keith	
March 24	"You Shouldn't Kiss Me Like This"	Toby Keith	
March 31	"One More Day"	Diamond Rio	
April 7	"Who I Am"	Jessica Andrews	
April 14	"Who I Am"	Jessica Andrews	
April 21	"Who I Am"	Jessica Andrews	
April 28	"Ain't Nothing 'bout You"	Brooks & Dunn	
May 5	"Ain't Nothing 'bout You"	Brooks & Dunn	
May 12	"Ain't Nothing 'bout You"	Brooks & Dunn	
May 19	"Ain't Nothing 'bout You"	Brooks & Dunn	
May 26	"Ain't Nothing 'bout You"	Brooks & Dunn	
June 2	"Ain't Nothing 'bout You"	Brooks & Dunn	
June 9	"Don't Happen Twice"	Kenny Chesney	
June 16	"Grown Men Don't Cry"	Tim McGraw	
June 23	"I'm Already There"	Lonestar	
June 30	"I'm Already There"	Lonestar	
July 7	"I'm Already There"	Lonestar	
July 14	"I'm Already There"	Lonestar	
July 21	"I'm Already There"	Lonestar	
July 28	"I'm Already There"	Lonestar	
August 4	"When I Think About Angels"	Jamie O'Neal	
August 11	"Austin"	Blake Shelton	
August 18	"Austin"	Blake Shelton	
August 25	"Austin"	Blake Shelton	
September 1	"Austin"	Blake Shelton	
September 8	"Austin"	Blake Shelton	
September 15	"I'm Just Talkin' About Tonight"	Toby Keith	
September 22	"What I Really Meant to Say"	Cyndi Thomson	
September 29	"What I Really Meant to Say"	Cyndi Thomson	
October 6	"What I Really Meant to Say"	Cyndi Thomson	
October 13	"Where I Come From"	Alan Jackson	
October 20	"Where I Come From"	Alan Jackson	
October 27	"Only in America"	Brooks & Dunn	
November 3	"Where I Come From"	Alan Jackson	
November 10	"Angry All the Time"	Tim McGraw	
November 17	"Angry All the Time"	Tim McGraw	
November 24	"I Wanna Talk About Me"	Toby Keith	
December 1	"I Wanna Talk About Me"	Toby Keith	
December 8	"I Wanna Talk About Me"	Toby Keith	
December 15	"I Wanna Talk About Me"	Toby Keith	
December 22	"I Wanna Talk About Me"	Toby Keith	
December 29	"Where Were You (When the World Stopped Turning)"	Alan Jackson	

== See also ==
- 2001 in music
- List of artists who reached number one on the U.S. country chart
