= To My Sorrow =

Single by Eddy Arnold and his Tennessee Plowboys
- B-side: Easy Rockin' Chair
- Released: September 29, 1947
- Recorded: September 24, 1946
- Studio: RCA Victor Studio 1, 155 East 24th St., New York City
- Genre: Country
- Label: RCA Victor 2481
- Songwriter(s): Vernice J. McAlpin
- Producer(s): Stephen H. Sholes

Eddy Arnold and his Tennessee Plowboys singles chronology
"I'll Hold You in My Heart (Till I Can Hold You in My Arms)" (1947)	"To My Sorrow" (1947)	"Anytime" (1948)

"To My Sorrow" is a country music song written by Vernice J. McAlpin, sung by Eddy Arnold (and His Texas Plowboys), and released in 1947 on the RCA Victor label (catalog no. 20-2481-A). In November 1947, it reached No. 2 on the Billboard folk juke box chart. It was also ranked as the No. 12 record on the Billboard 1947 year-end folk juke box chart.
