= Texarkana Baby (song) =

1947 song by Cottonseed Clark and Fred Rose

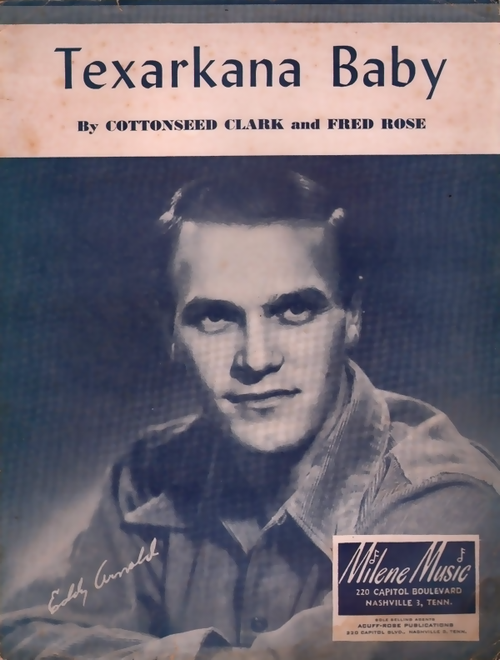
- Eddy Arnold on the cover of the "Texarkana Baby" folio

Single by Eddy Arnold and his Tennessee Plowboys
- B-side: Bouquet of Roses
- Published: January 26, 1948 Milene Music, Nashville
- Released: April 5, 1948
- Recorded: August 20, 1947
- Studio: RCA Victor Studio 1, New York City
- Genre: Country
- Length: 2:39
- Label: RCA Victor 20-2806
- Songwriters: Cottonseed Clark, Fred Rose

Eddy Arnold and his Tennessee Plowboys singles chronology
"Anytime" (1948)	"Texarkana Baby" (1948)	"Just a Little Lovin' (Will Go a Long Way)" (1948)

"Texarkana Baby" is a song written by Fred Rose and Cottonseed Clark.

== Background ==
The song was first made popular by Eddy Arnold in 1948. Eddy Arnold and his Tennessee Plowboys and his Guitar recorded it RCA Victor Studios in New York City on August 20, 1947. It was released by RCA Victor Records as catalog number 20-2806 in the United States and by EMI on the His Master's Voice label as catalog numbers BD 1234 and IM 1399. "Texarkana Baby" was the B-side of Arnold's version of "Bouquet of Roses" and made it to number one on the Best Selling Retail Folk Records chart for one week in between the nineteen weeks "Bouquet of Roses" stayed at number one.

On March 31, 1949, "Texarkana Baby" was among the first seven-inch 45 rpm records issued by RCA in the United States. Often given credit as the very first release, or the first-ever Country record to be released in this format, it was just one of many 45s released on that first day. Texarkana/Bouquet appears in green vinyl as 48-0001, an odd choice since RCA generally started a series with 0000 (Crudup 50-0000, Meisels 51-0000, Goodman 52-0000). Likely, 48-0000 was assigned then later withdrawn due to contract or copyright problems. Still Mr. Arnold gets credit for the first country 45. The first production 45 rpm record pressed was "PeeWee the Piccolo" RCA 47-0146 pressed Dec. 7, 1948, at RCA's Sherman Avenue plant in Indianapolis, Indiana.

== Cover versions ==
- Bob Wills and His Texas Playboys recorded their version of "Texarkana Baby" on December 30, 1947, during the so-called "Tiffany Transcriptions" sessions in California; this version peaked at number fifteen on the Billboard chart on July 24, 1948.
- A cover of this song by Duke Special is included as a bonus track on the Deluxe Edition of their album I Never Thought This Day Would Come.
