= List of Hot C&W Sides number ones of 1960 =

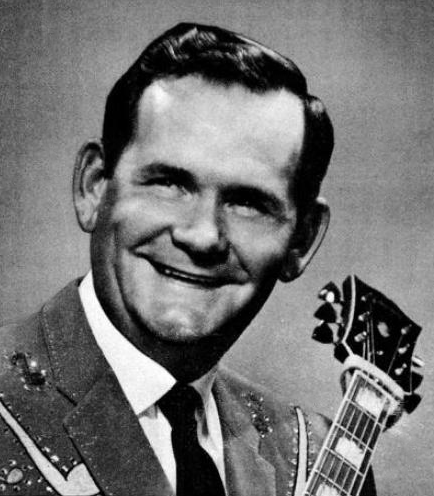
Hank Locklin spent 14 consecutive weeks at number one with "Please Help Me, I'm Falling".

Hot Country Songs is a chart that ranks the top-performing country music songs in the United States, published by Billboard magazine. In 1960, five different songs topped the chart, which at the time was published under the title Hot C&W Sides, C&W being an abbreviation for country and western. Chart placings were based on playlists submitted by country music radio stations and sales reports submitted by stores.

In the issue of Billboard dated January 4, the song at number one was "El Paso" by Marty Robbins, the track's third week in the top spot. It held the peak position for the first five weeks of 1960, during which time it also topped the all-genre Hot 100 chart for two weeks. During the remainder of the year, only four other songs reached the top of the Hot C&W Sides listing, three of which each spent twelve or more consecutive weeks at number one. In the issue of Billboard dated February 8, Jim Reeves began a 14-week unbroken run at the top of the chart with "He'll Have to Go", which was immediately followed by a run of the same length by Hank Locklin's "Please Help Me, I'm Falling". Both songs were produced by Chet Atkins, widely seen as the originator of the "Nashville Sound", a new style of country music which eschewed elements of the earlier honky-tonk style in favour of smooth productions which had a broader appeal. Cowboy Copas next spent 12 weeks at number one with "Alabam". Several singles peaked at number two during these songs' extended runs at the top of the chart, including "One More Time" by Ray Price, which spent eight consecutive weeks in second place behind Locklin's song.

"Alabam" was the first chart-topping single for Copas and marked a comeback in his career, as prior to its success he had not entered the chart at all since 1952. Nonetheless, it would be the only number one for the singer, who died in a plane crash in 1963. "Please Help Me, I'm Falling" was Locklin's first number one since he topped the earlier Country and Western Most Played by Jockeys chart in January 1954, but like Copas he would not return to the top spot, even though he would remain an active recording artist into the 21st century. The final country number one of 1960 was Ferlin Husky's "Wings of a Dove"; although he would continue to chart well into the 1970s, Husky would also not achieve another number one. Marty Robbins, in contrast, would go on to achieve several more number ones, including 1976's "El Paso City", a sequel of sorts to his earlier song.

== Chart history ==
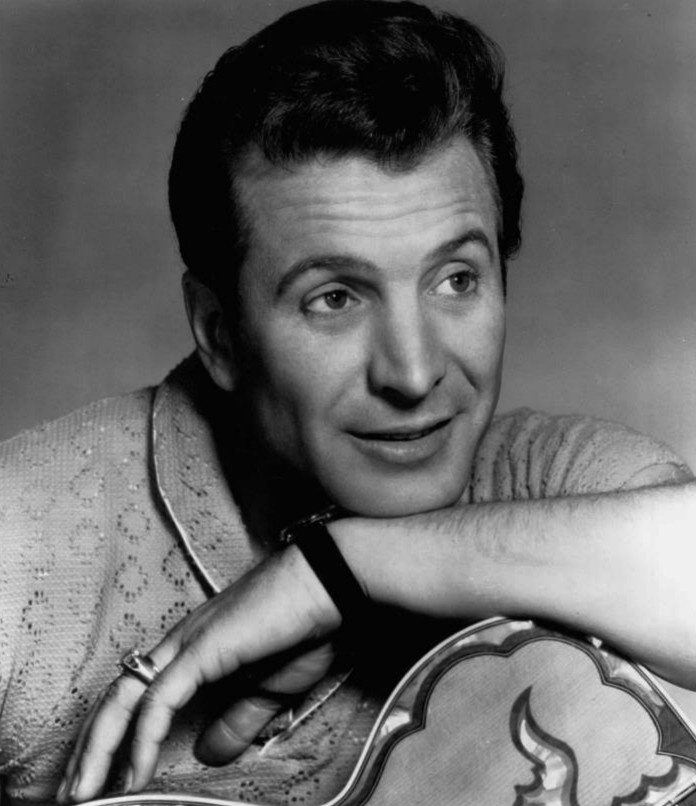
Ferlin Husky ended the year at number one.

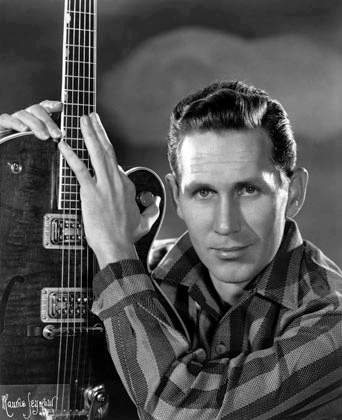
Chet Atkins produced two singles which between them spent 28 consecutive weeks at number one.

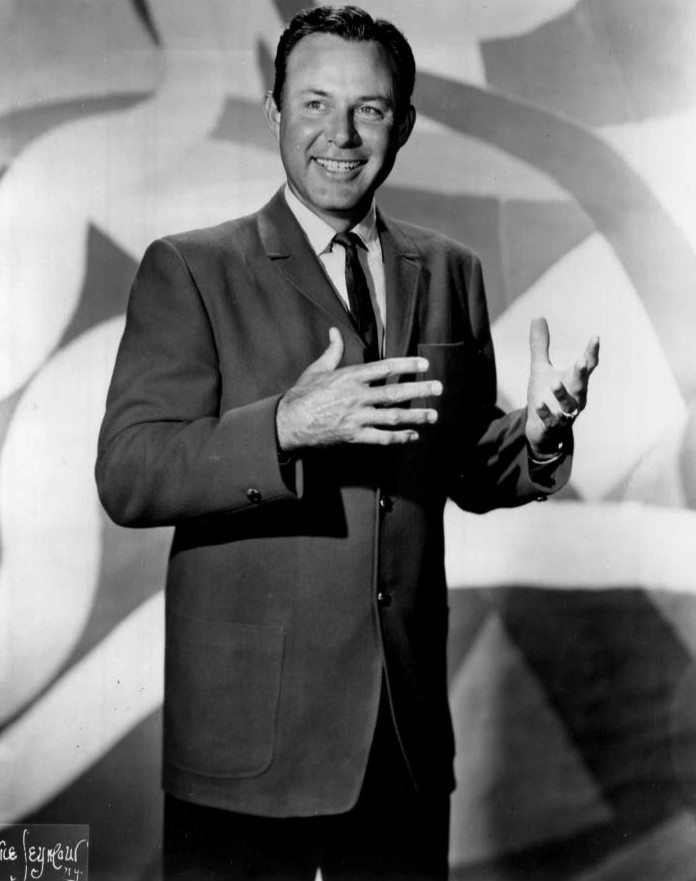
Jim Reeves spent 14 weeks at number one with "He'll Have to Go".

Chart history
Issue date	Title	Artist(s)	Ref.
January 4	"El Paso"	Marty Robbins	
January 11	"El Paso"	Marty Robbins	
January 18	"El Paso"	Marty Robbins	
January 25	"El Paso"	Marty Robbins	
February 1	"El Paso"	Marty Robbins	
February 8	"He'll Have to Go"	Jim Reeves	
February 15	"He'll Have to Go"	Jim Reeves	
February 22	"He'll Have to Go"	Jim Reeves	
February 29	"He'll Have to Go"	Jim Reeves	
March 7	"He'll Have to Go"	Jim Reeves	
March 14	"He'll Have to Go"	Jim Reeves	
March 21	"He'll Have to Go"	Jim Reeves	
March 28	"He'll Have to Go"	Jim Reeves	
April 4	"He'll Have to Go"	Jim Reeves	
April 11	"He'll Have to Go"	Jim Reeves	
April 18	"He'll Have to Go"	Jim Reeves	
April 25	"He'll Have to Go"	Jim Reeves	
May 2	"He'll Have to Go"	Jim Reeves	
May 9	"He'll Have to Go"	Jim Reeves	
May 16	"Please Help Me, I'm Falling"	Hank Locklin	
May 23	"Please Help Me, I'm Falling"	Hank Locklin	
May 30	"Please Help Me, I'm Falling"	Hank Locklin	
June 6	"Please Help Me, I'm Falling"	Hank Locklin	
June 13	"Please Help Me, I'm Falling"	Hank Locklin	
June 20	"Please Help Me, I'm Falling"	Hank Locklin	
June 27	"Please Help Me, I'm Falling"	Hank Locklin	
July 4	"Please Help Me, I'm Falling"	Hank Locklin	
July 11	"Please Help Me, I'm Falling"	Hank Locklin	
July 18	"Please Help Me, I'm Falling"	Hank Locklin	
July 25	"Please Help Me, I'm Falling"	Hank Locklin	
August 1	"Please Help Me, I'm Falling"	Hank Locklin	
August 8	"Please Help Me, I'm Falling"	Hank Locklin	
August 15	"Please Help Me, I'm Falling"	Hank Locklin	
August 22	"Alabam"	Cowboy Copas	
August 29	"Alabam"	Cowboy Copas	
September 5	"Alabam"	Cowboy Copas	
September 12	"Alabam"	Cowboy Copas	
September 19	"Alabam"	Cowboy Copas	
September 26	"Alabam"	Cowboy Copas	
October 3	"Alabam"	Cowboy Copas	
October 10	"Alabam"	Cowboy Copas	
October 17	"Alabam"	Cowboy Copas	
October 24	"Alabam"	Cowboy Copas	
October 31	"Alabam"	Cowboy Copas	
November 7	"Alabam"	Cowboy Copas	
November 14	"Wings of a Dove"	Ferlin Husky	
November 21	"Wings of a Dove"	Ferlin Husky	
November 28	"Wings of a Dove"	Ferlin Husky	
December 5	"Wings of a Dove"	Ferlin Husky	
December 12	"Wings of a Dove"	Ferlin Husky	
December 19	"Wings of a Dove"	Ferlin Husky	
December 26	"Wings of a Dove"	Ferlin Husky	
December 31^{[A]}	"Wings of a Dove"	Ferlin Husky	

== See also ==
- 1960 in music
- 1960 in country music
- List of artists who reached number one on the U.S. country chart

== Notes and references ==
Notes
A. The last issue of 1960 was dated December 31, only five days after the previous issue. The next issue was dated January 9, 1961.
