= Bouquet of Roses (song) =

1947 song by Steve Nelson and Bob Hilliard

Single by Eddy Arnold and his Tennessee Plowboys
- B-side: Texarkana Baby
- Published: June 1, 1948 by Hill and Range Songs, Inc., Hollywood, Calif.
- Released: April 5, 1948
- Recorded: May 18, 1947
- Studio: RCA Victor Studio, 30 S. Michigan Ave., Chicago, IL
- Genre: Country
- Length: 2:33
- Label: RCA Victor 20-2806
- Composer: Steve Nelson
- Lyricist: Bob Hilliard

Eddy Arnold and his Tennessee Plowboys singles chronology
"Anytime" (1948)	"Bouquet of Roses" (1948)	"Just a Little Lovin' (Will Go a Long Way)" (1948)

"Bouquet of Roses" is a 1948 song written by Steve Nelson (music) and Bob Hilliard (lyrics). It was originally recorded by Eddy Arnold and his Tennessee Plow Boys and his Guitar in Chicago on May 18, 1947. It was released by RCA Victor as catalogue number 20-2806 (in USA) and by EMI on the His Master's Voice label as catalogue numbers BD 1234 and IM 1399. "Bouquet of Roses" was Eddy Arnold's third number one in a row on the Juke Box Folk Record chart and spent 19 weeks on the Best Selling Folk Records chart. In 1949, when RCA Victor introduced its new 45 RPM single format this record was among seven initial releases (Catalog #48-0001) and the first in the Country and Western category. Arnold would re-record "Bouquet of Roses" several times during his career.

The song spent 54 weeks on the country music charts, accounting for the longest amount of time spent on that chart. The record held until September 2010, when it was broken by Lee Brice's "Love Like Crazy."

== Chart performance ==
Chart (1948–1949)	Peak position
US Hot Country Songs (Billboard)	1
US Billboard Hot 100	13

== Cover versions ==
- 1948 Dick Haymes
- 1957 Marty Robbins in the album The Song of Robbins.
- 1958 Margaret Whiting recorded for her album Margaret.
- 1963 Al Martino for his album I Love You Because.
- 1963 Clint Eastwood included in the album Rawhide's Clint Eastwood Sings Cowboy Favorites.
- 1963 Dean Martin in the album Dean "Tex" Martin Rides Again.
- 1963 The Mills Brothers recorded for their album The End of the World.
- 1964 The Andrews Sisters for their album Great Country Hits
- 1964 Slim Whitman for his album Country Songs / City Hits
- 1965 Bing Crosby included the song in his album Bing Crosby Sings the Great Country Hits.
- 1975, Mickey Gilley recorded the song which peaked at number eleven on the country chart.
