= Anytime (1921 song) =

1921 song written by Herbert "Happy" Lawson

"Any Time"

Single by Emmett Miller
- B-side: The Pickaninnies' Paradise
- Published: December 22, 1921 Herbert Happy Lawson Music Publishing Company, Dallas
- Released: December 1924
- Recorded: October 25, 1924
- Genre: Popular
- Length: 3:18
- Label: OKeh 40239
- Songwriter: Herbert Happy Lawson

"Any Time"
- Sheet music of "Any Time" from 1950s.

Single by Eddy Arnold and his Tennessee Plowboys
- B-side: What a Fool I Was
- Released: February 9, 1948
- Recorded: August 20, 1947
- Studio: RCA Victor, New York City
- Genre: Country
- Length: 2:56
- Label: RCA Victor 20-2700
- Producers: Stephen H. Sholes, Charles R. Grean

Eddy Arnold and his Tennessee Plowboys singles chronology
"To My Sorrow" (1947)	"Any Time" (1948)	"Bouquet of Roses" (1948)

"Any Time" is a Tin Pan Alley song written by Herbert "Happy" Lawson. It was published in 1921 and first recorded by Emmett Miller for OKeh Records in 1924, accompanying himself on ukulele, Lawson recorded his own version for Gennett Records on July 31, 1925. It became associated with Country music when Eddy Arnold rescued it from obscurity in 1948, topping the Billboard Juke Box Folk Records Chart for nine weeks.

== Charted versions ==
- Eddy Arnold released a version in 1948 that reached No.1 on the U.S. country chart and No.17 on the U.S. pop chart.
- Foy Willing and His Riders of the Purple Sage released a version in 1948 that reached No.13 on the U.S. country chart.
- Eddie Fisher released a version in 1951 that reached No.2 in the U.S.
- Patsy Cline recorded a version that was released posthumously in 1969 and reached No.73 on the U.S. country chart.
- The Osmond Brothers released a version that reached No.54 on the U.S. country chart in 1985.
