= In the Jailhouse Now =

Single by Webb Pierce
- B-side: "I'm Gonna Fall Out of Love with You"
- Released: December 1954
- Recorded: December 3, 1954
- Genre: Country
- Label: Decca 9-29391
- Songwriters: Jimmie Rodgers; Elsie McWilliams
- Producer: Paul Cohen

Webb Pierce singles chronology
"More and More" (1954)	"In the Jailhouse Now" (1954)	"I Don't Care" (1955)

"In the Jailhouse Now" is an American novelty blues song originally found in vaudeville performances from the early 20th century, The earliest known version was written in 1915 by Totts Davis and Ed Stafford. It later became associated with Jimmie Rodgers, by way of the yodeling country music versions he recorded in 1928 and 1930, and has been extensively covered in the subsequent years, often giving songwriting credit to Rodgers. The song's first two verses trace the exploits of Ramblin' Bob, who cheats at cards and gets caught, while the final verse tells about taking a girl named Susie out on the town and winding up in jail together.

== Jimmie Rodgers recording ==
Rodgers' version of "In the Jailhouse Now" was recorded February 15, 1928, in Camden, New Jersey, and features Rodgers on vocals and guitar, with Ellsworth T. Cozzens playing banjo. Rodgers included his famous yodel throughout the song. He recorded a sequel titled "In the Jailhouse Now—No. 2" in Hollywood, California, in 1930, which follows the misadventures of a man named Campbell.

== Recording and copyright history ==
The song has been covered many times, most frequently with Jimmie Rodgers' version. Artists who have sung it include Ernest Tubb, Tommy Duncan, Webb Pierce, Pink Anderson, Johnny Cash, Jim Croce, Jim Jackson, Leon Russell, Mother McCree's Uptown Jug Champions (featuring Jerry Garcia), Merle Haggard, Doc Watson, Prism, Suzy Bogguss (with Chet Atkins ) Pokey LaFarge, and Tim Blake Nelson with The Soggy Bottom Boys in the film and soundtrack for O Brother, Where Art Thou?. It was also one of the first songs learned by a teenage Joan Baez. The song shows up under different titles including "He's in the Jailhouse Now", and some versions use the line "She's in the graveyard now" in the chorus.

Prior to 1930, several different versions of it were recorded and copyrighted. The earliest is Davis and Stafford's 1915 version, which has verses about a man named Campbell cheating at a card game and a corrupt election. In 1924, Whistler's Jug Band from Louisville, Kentucky, recorded it under the title "Jail House Blues", which was the same title as a famous blues tune by Bessie Smith but was, in fact, the same song as "In the Jailhouse Now".

In 1927, Earl McDonald's Original Louisville Jug Band made another recording of the song. Two African-American bluesmen also recorded the song prior to Rodgers: Blind Blake (in 1927), and Jim Jackson (in January 1928).^{Source Needed} Jackson also copyrighted the song before Rodgers. Finally, in 1930, the Memphis Sheiks (a pseudonym for the Memphis Jug Band) recorded it in a version that scholars have often claimed was a cover of Jimmie Rodgers. On some of the Memphis Sheiks' records, an African-American vaudeville performer named Bert Murphy is given credit for writing the song.

After Rodgers recorded the song, three additional versions appeared that were decidedly not covers of Rodgers. Boyd Senter and his Senterpedes did a jazz version in 1929 for Victor Records (issued on #22010, and later reissued on Bluebird Records #5545); Gene Kardos and His Orchestra also did a jazz version in 1932 for Victor; and Billy Mitchell did a stride piano and shouter version of it in 1936 for the Bluebird label.

After Rodgers, the best-known version of the song was by Webb Pierce, who had a No. 1 country hit with the song in 1955. Pierce's version spent No. 1 on the Billboard country chart for 21 weeks, becoming the third song in the chart's history to spend as long on the chart; previously, Eddy Arnold ("I'll Hold You in My Heart (Till I Can Hold You in My Arms)," 1947) and Hank Snow ("I'm Movin' On", 1950) achieved the feat. For 58 years, those three songs held the longevity record for most weeks at No. 1 with 21 weeks, with only a handful of songs coming within a month of matching the record into the early 1960s. Finally, on August 10, 2013, "Cruise" by Florida Georgia Line surpassed Pierce's "In the Jailhouse Now" for most weeks at No. 1 when it spent its 22nd week at No. 1.

When Johnny Cash recorded the song in 1962, he used a more humorous set of lyrics, based on the 1915 version; it includes anecdotes of Campbell's wife Sadie carrying on an affair with the sheriff while Campbell is incarcerated, and Campbell's fooling the Prohibition Party into supporting his New Orleans-to-Boston pub crawl under the guise of a campaign for President. In spite of this, most writers claim that Cash was covering Jimmie Rodgers' song, which further obscures that the song originated with African-American performers and was kept alive in a vaudeville and jug band tradition for many decades.

The song regained popularity years later when Sonny James recorded a live version during a 1976 concert at Tennessee State Prison. James' version included backing by the Tennessee State Prison Band, and peaked at No. 15 on the Hot Country Singles chart in 1977.

The Jimmie Rodgers version was sung by Gene Autry in his 1941 movie "Back in the Saddle."

In O Brother, Where Art Thou?, "Delmar" (Tim Blake Nelson) sings a rendition, with "Pete" (John Turturro) yodeling between the verses, prior to the Soggy Bottom Boys' main number, "Man of Constant Sorrow". The other "Soggy Bottom Boys" songs are lip-synched, but Tim Blake Nelson sings his own vocals on this song, while Turturro's yodeling is actually performed by Pat Enright of the Nashville Bluegrass Band.

In 1979, the song was done in a blackface performance in the musical One Mo' Time by Vernel Bagneris. The musical was revived on Broadway in 2002. The version of the song used in the show was the same as that recorded by the Louisville Jug Bands in the 1920s.

Brad Paisley used the chorus for the end of "Mr. Policeman", a song on his 2007 album 5th Gear. New lyrics were written to provide an ending to the song's story.

== See also ==
- "Man of Constant Sorrow"
- "I'll Fly Away"
