= I'll Hold You in My Heart (Till I Can Hold You in My Arms) =

Single by Eddy Arnold and his Tennessee Plowboys
- B-side: Don't Bother to Cry
- Published: May 15, 1947 by Adams, Vee and Abbott, Inc., Chicago
- Released: June 30, 1947
- Recorded: May 18, 1947
- Studio: RCA Victor Studio, 30 S. Michigan Ave., Chicago
- Genre: Country
- Length: 2:33
- Label: RCA Victor
- Songwriters: Eddy Arnold, Hal Horton and Tommy Dilbeck
- Producer: Stephen H. Sholes

Eddy Arnold and his Tennessee Plowboys singles chronology
"It's A Sin" (1947)	"I'll Hold You in My Heart (Till I Can Hold You in My Arms)" (1947)	"To My Sorrow" (1947)

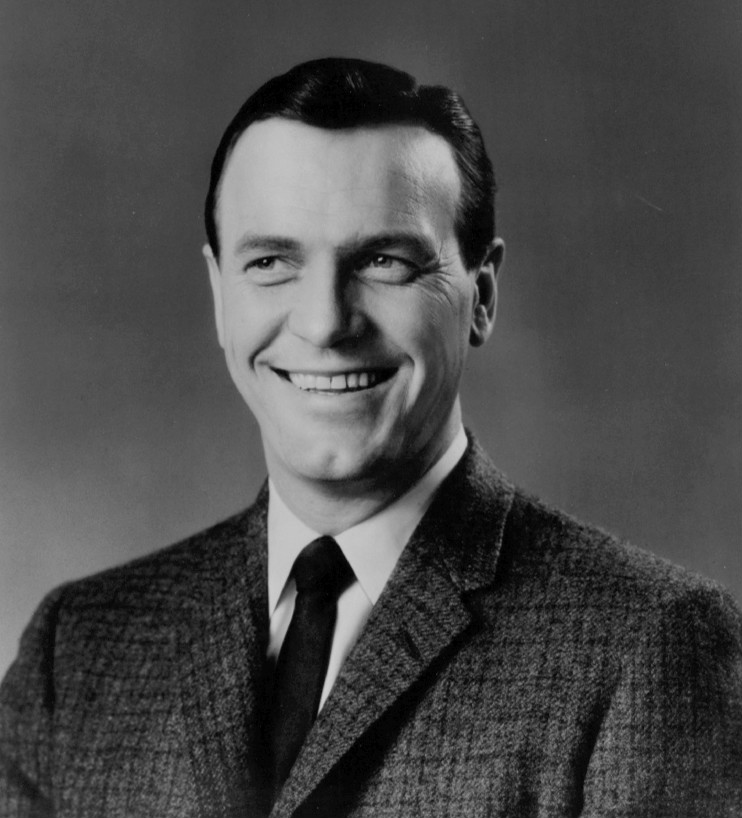
Eddy Arnold.

"I'll Hold You in My Heart (Till I Can Hold You in My Arms)" is a 1947 song by Eddy Arnold. The song was Eddy Arnold's third number one on the Billboard Juke Box Folk Records chart. "I'll Hold You in My Heart (Till I Can Hold You in My Arms)" spent 46 weeks on the chart and 21 weeks at number one. The song also served as Arnold's first crossover hit, peaking at number 22 on the Billboard Best Sellers in Stores chart.

== Writers ==
It was written by Eddy Arnold, Hal Horton and Tommy Dilbeck and first recorded by Eddy Arnold in 1947. It went to number one on the country charts and stayed there for 21 weeks, making it the 2nd longest running number one country hit of all time. (It actually tied "I'm Movin' On" by Hank Snow and "In the Jailhouse Now" by Webb Pierce but they are listed 1-2-3 on the all-time chart.)

The Arnold version was the first of three songs through the mid 1950s to spend 21 weeks at No. 1. In 1950, Hank Snow's "I'm Movin' On" would match the record, and in 1955, their record would become jointly held by Webb Pierce with his cover of Jimmie Rodgers' "In the Jailhouse Now." For 58 years, nobody would match their shared record until August 2013, when – thanks to methodology changes in how Billboard tabulated its Hot Country Songs chart (airplay, music downloads and online streaming) – "Cruise" by Florida Georgia Line matched the record of 21 weeks at No. 1. On August 10, "Cruise" spent its 22nd week at No. 1, surpassing the Arnold, Snow and Pierce songs for most weeks at No. 1.

== Covers ==
The song went on to become a major country crooner standard. The song also appeared on the Billboard pop chart in 1951 with recordings by Eddie Fisher and Toni Arden. Among others the songs was covered by:

- Elvis Presley
- Dean Martin, Glen Campbell
- Slim Whitman
- Jerry Lee Lewis
- In 1977, the song was covered by Jan Howard. Her version, released on Con Brio Records, became a minor hit on the Billboard country chart.

== Popular culture ==
- It was played by Don Walser in the 1998 film The Hi-Lo Country, a performance regarded as one of the highlights of the movie.
