= Hot Country Songs =

Weekly chart published by Billboard

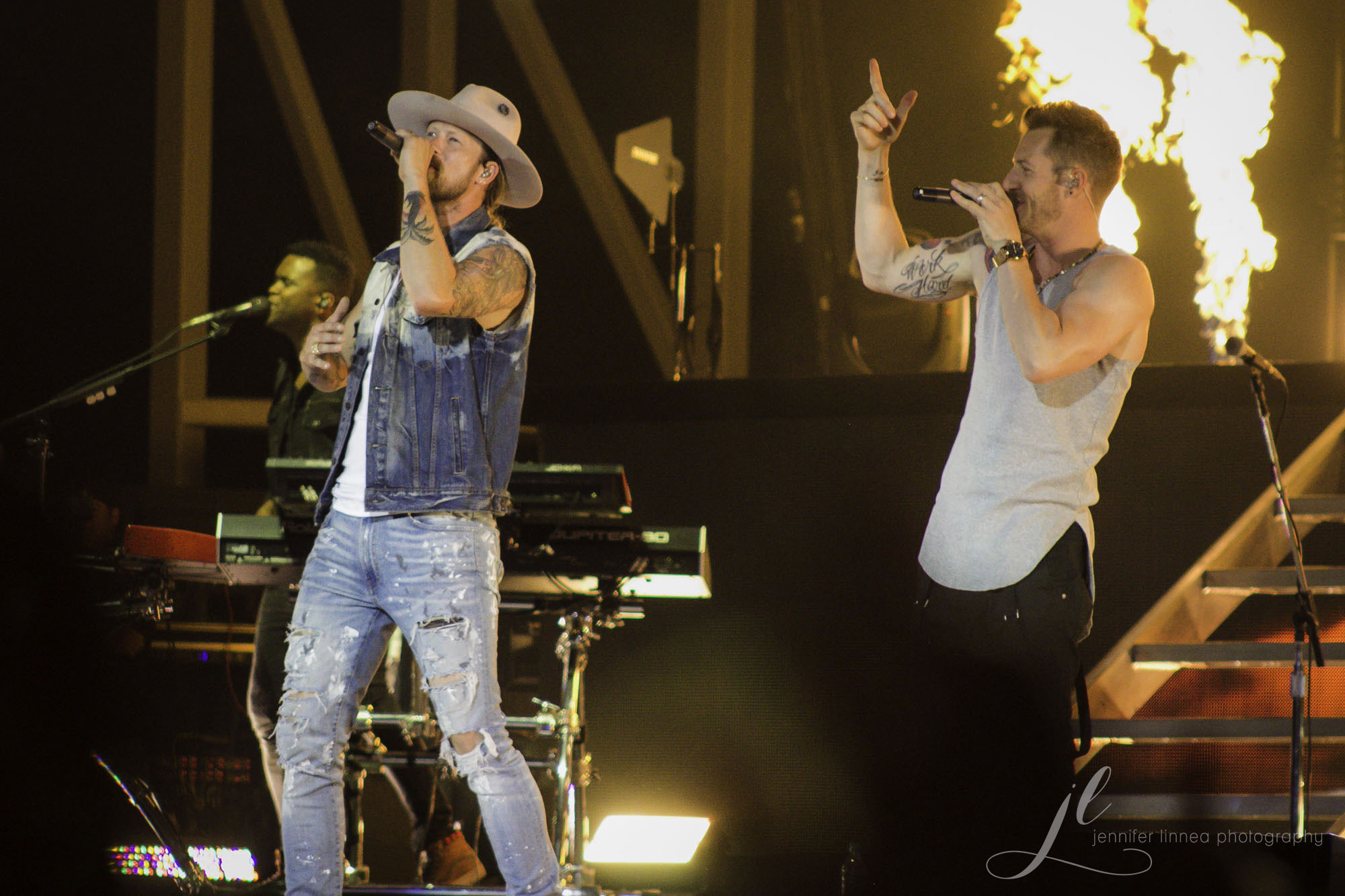
Florida Georgia Line holds the records for the most cumulative weeks atop the Hot Country Songs chart (106) and the most weeks atop the chart for a single song (50 for "Meant to Be", a collaboration with pop singer Bebe Rexha).

Hot Country Songs is a chart published weekly by Billboard magazine in the United States.

This 50-position chart lists the most popular country music songs, calculated weekly by collecting airplay data along with digital sales and streaming.

The current number-one song on the chart dated November 21, 2026, is "Choosin' Texas" by Ella Langley.

== History ==
Billboard began compiling the popularity of country songs with its January 8, 1944, issue. Only the genre's most popular jukebox selections were tabulated, with the chart titled "Most Played Juke Box Folk Records".

For approximately ten years, from 1948 to 1958, Billboard used three charts to measure the popularity of a given song. In addition to the jukebox chart, these charts included:

- The "best sellers" chart – started 15 May 1948, as "Best Selling Retail Folk Records".
- An airplay chart – started 10 December 1949, as "Country & Western Records Most Played By Folk Disk Jockeys".

The juke box chart was discontinued in June 1957. Starting with the 20 October 1958, issue, Billboard began combining sales and radio airplay in figuring a song's overall popularity, counting them in one single chart called "Hot C&W Sides". The chart was published under the title Hot C&W Sides through the 27 October 1962, issue and "Hot Country Singles" thereafter, a title it would retain until 1990.

On 20 January 1990, the Hot Country Singles chart was reduced from 100 to 75 positions and began to be compiled entirely from information provided by Nielsen Broadcast Data Systems, a system which electronically monitors radio airplay of songs. Four weeks later, on February 17, the chart was retitled "Hot Country Singles & Tracks". Beginning with the January 13, 2001, issue, the chart was reduced from 75 to 60 positions, and all songs on the chart at the time had their tally of weeks spent on the chart adjusted to count only weeks spent at No. 60 or higher. Effective April 30, 2005, the chart was renamed "Hot Country Songs".

Starting in 1990, the rankings were determined by Arbitron-tallied listener audience for each spin that a song received. The methodology was changed for the first chart published in 1992 to tally the amount of spins a song received, but in January 2005, the methodology reverted to the audience format. This change was brought on because of "label-sponsored spin programs" that had manipulated the chart several times in 2004.

The Hot Country Songs chart methodology was changed starting with the 20 October 2012, issue to match the Billboard Hot 100: digital downloads and streaming data are combined with airplay from all radio formats to determine position. A new chart, the Country Airplay chart, was created using airplay exclusively from country radio stations. Following the change, songs that were receiving airplay on top-40 pop were given a major advantage over songs popular only on country radio, and as an unintended consequence, such songs began having record-long runs at the top of the chart. The first song to benefit from this change was Taylor Swift's "We Are Never Ever Getting Back Together", which had been declining in popularity but shot up to number one on the chart the first week the change took effect and stayed there until it set an all-time record for the most weeks at No. 1 by a solo female. This was followed almost immediately by Florida Georgia Line's "Cruise", which had the longest stay at number one of any song in the country chart's history (24 weeks), until it was surpassed by Sam Hunt's "Body Like a Back Road" in 2017 (34 weeks). The record was subsequently broken by Bebe Rexha and Florida Georgia Line's "Meant to Be" in 2018 (50 weeks).

Billboard has not explicitly defined how it determines which songs qualify for the country chart and which ones do not, only that "a few factors are determined (...) first and foremost is musical composition" and that a song must "embrace enough elements of today's country music" to qualify. The 1990–2012 chart did not have such ambiguity, being objectively measured by airplay from specifically identified country stations alone. A later statement from Billboard elaborated on what those "few factors" entailed: "most notably the song's musical composition, but also how the song is marketed and promoted, the musical history of the artist, airplay the song receives and how the song is platformed on streaming services". The 2019 country rap record "Old Town Road" by Lil Nas X was a subject of controversy over this ambiguous standard after it initially appeared on the country chart, where it debuted and peaked at number 19, before Billboard took the song off subsequent charts, claiming it had made a mistake in including it. The song gained popularity through viral memes rather than radio, as only one country station, Radio Disney Country, had played it at the time of the charting.

== Hot Country Songs chart achievements ==
=== Songs with most weeks at number one ===
These are the songs with 16 or more weeks at number one. Fifteen songs accomplished this feat between 1946 and 1964 (including on the country charts published by Billboard prior to the launch in 1958 of what is now the Hot Country Songs listing), but none did so again until after the 2012 reformulation; between the nine-week run of "Almost Persuaded" by David Houston in 1966 and the chart's reformulation in 2012, no song spent more than eight weeks atop the chart. Prolonged runs became commonplace again in 2012. As of November 21, 2026, sixteen songs from this period have topped the chart for at least 16 weeks, and the eight longest chart runs have all been since 2012.

Weeks	Song	Artist	Year(s)	Source
50	"Meant to Be"	Bebe Rexha and Florida Georgia Line	2017–2018	
49	"Choosin' Texas"	Ella Langley	2025–2026	
45	"A Bar Song (Tipsy)"	Shaboozey	2024–2025	
34	"Body Like a Back Road"	Sam Hunt	2017	
27	"I Hope"	Gabby Barrett	2020–2021	
25	"Last Night"	Morgan Wallen	2023	
24	"Cruise"	Florida Georgia Line	2012–2013	
24	"Fancy Like"	Walker Hayes	2021–2022	
21	"I'll Hold You in My Heart (Till I Can Hold You in My Arms)"†	Eddy Arnold	1947–1948	
21	"I'm Moving On"‡	Hank Snow	1950	
21	"In the Jailhouse Now"†	Webb Pierce	1955	
21	"10,000 Hours"	Dan + Shay and Justin Bieber	2019–2020	
20	"I Don't Hurt Anymore"†‡	Hank Snow	1954	
20	"Crazy Arms"§	Ray Price	1956	
20	"I Remember Everything"	Zach Bryan featuring Kacey Musgraves	2023–2024	
20	"What I Want"	Morgan Wallen featuring Tate McRae	2025	
19	"Bouquet Of Roses"‡	Eddy Arnold	1947–1948	
19	"Walk On By"	Leroy Van Dyke	1961–1962	
19	"The Bones"	Maren Morris	2020	
19	"You Proof"	Morgan Wallen	2022	
18	"H.O.L.Y."	Florida Georgia Line	2016	
17	"Slippin' Around"‡	Jimmy Wakely and Margaret Whiting	1949–1950	
17	"Slowly"†‡	Webb Pierce	1954	
17	"Heartbreak Hotel"‡	Elvis Presley	1956	
17	"Die a Happy Man"	Thomas Rhett	2015–2016	
16	"Guitar Polka"†	Al Dexter	1946	
16	"New Spanish Two Step"†	Bob Wills	1946	
16	"Smoke! Smoke! Smoke! (That Cigarette)"†	Tex Williams	1947–1948	
16	"Lovesick Blues"‡	Hank Williams	1949–1950	
16	"Love's Gonna Live Here"	Buck Owens	1963–1964	

Note: Songs marked † achieved the listed run on the Most Played in Juke Boxes chart (published 1944–57). Songs marked ‡ achieved the listed run on the Best Sellers on Stores chart (published 1948–58). Songs marked § achieved the listed run on the Most Played by Jockeys chart (published 1949–58). All these songs also had shorter runs at number one on the other charts not indicated. In 1958 the best sellers and jockeys charts were merged to create the multimetric Hot C&W Sides listing (now Hot Country Songs).

=== Artists with most cumulative weeks at number one ===
With at least 50+ weeks at # 1.

Weeks at number one	Artist	Source
106	Florida Georgia Line	
97	Morgan Wallen	
84	George Strait	
82	Buck Owens	
73	Tim McGraw	
72	Kenny Chesney	
60	Alan Jackson	
57	Sonny James	
56	Merle Haggard	
53	Toby Keith	
52	Sam Hunt	
50	Keith Urban	
50	Bebe Rexha	

=== Artists with the most number one hits ===
George Strait has the most number one hits, at 44. Dolly Parton has the most number ones of any female artist, with 25.

== See also ==
- List of number-one country hits (United States)
- American Country Countdown
- List of years in country music
- List of artists who reached number one on the U.S. Hot Country chart
- Country Airplay
