= Billboard Top Folk Records of 1949 =

The Billboard Top Folk Records of 1949 is made up of two year-end charts compiled by Billboard magazine ranking the year's top folk records based on record sales and juke box plays. In 1949, country music records were included on, and dominated, the Billboard folk records chart.

Both charts were topped by Hank Williams' "Lovesick Blues"; the song posted 4,182 points on the retail sales chart and 1,716 points on the juke box chart -- nearly doubling the point total of any other song. Williams also posted the No. 5 hit on the year-end charts with "Wedding Bells".

Eddy Arnold led all other artists with nine records on the year-end charts. Arnold's "Don't Rob Another Man's Castle" ranked No. 2 on both year-end charts with 2,270 retail points and 981 juke box points.

Four versions of the song "Candy Kisses" made the year-end charts. George Morgan's version was a No. 1 hit while the song also led to hits for Red Foley (No. 4), Elton Britt (No. 4), and Cowboy Copas (No. 5).

On the strength of Eddy Arnold's performance, RCA Victor led all other labels with ten records on the year-end charts. Decca ranked second with eight records followed by Columbia with five and Capitol with four.

Sales year-end	Juke box year-end	Peak (Note: This column recites the record's peak position on Billboard's weekly charts.)	Title	Artist(s)	Label
1	1	1	"Lovesick Blues"	Hank Williams	M-G-M
2	2	1	"Don't Rob Another Man's Castle"	Eddy Arnold	RCA Victor
3	4	1	"I'm Throwing Rice (At The Girl That I Love)"	Eddy Arnold	RCA Victor
4	3	1	"Slippin' Around"	Margaret Whiting-Jimmy Wakely	Capitol
5	5	2	"Wedding Bells"	Hank Williams	M-G-M
6	13	1	"Candy Kisses"	George Morgan	Columbia
7	6	1	"Why Don't You Haul Off and Love Me"	Wayne Raney	King
8	NR	1	"Bouquet of Roses"	Eddy Arnold	RCA Victor
9	9	1	"I Love You So Much It Hurts"	Jimmy Wakely	Capitol
10	7	1	"Tennessee Saturday Night"	Red Foley	Decca
11	14	2	"The Echo of Your Footsteps"	Eddy Arnold	RCA Victor
12	10	1	"One Has My Name (The Other Has My Heart)"	Jimmy Wakely	Capitol
13	8	1	"One Kiss Too Many"	Eddy Arnold	RCA Victor
14	11	1	"Slippin' Around"	Ernest Tubb	Decca
15	16	3	"Tennessee Border"	Red Foley	Decca
16	12	1	"A Heart Full of Love (For a Handful of Kisses)"	Eddy Arnold	RCA Victor
17	21	1	"Blues, Stay Away From Me"	Delmore Brothers	King
18	18	2	"I'm Bitin' My Fingernails and Thinking of You"	Ernest Tubb-Andrews Sisters	Decca
19	23	4	"Please Don't Let Me Love You"	George Morgan	Columbia
20	25	5	"Let's Say Goodbye Like We Said Hello"	Ernest Tubb	Decca
21	20	2	"I'll Never Slip Around Again"	Jimmy Wakely, Margaret Whiting	Capitol
22	26	4	"Candy Kisses"	Red Foley	Decca
23	NR	4	"Candy Kisses"	Elton Britt & Skytoppers	RCA Victor
24	15	2	"Then I Turned and Walked Slowly Away"	Eddy Arnold	RCA Victor
25	30	5	"Slipping Around"	Floyd Tillman	Columbia
26	NR	4	"Room Full of Roses"	George Morgan	Columbia
27	19	1	"Just a Little Lovin'"	Eddy Arnold	RCA Victor
28	29	4	"I Never Saw Maggie Alone"	Kenny Roberts	Coral
29	NR	7	"Take an Old Cold 'Tater (And Wait)"	Little Jimmy Dickens	Columbia
30	17	4	"Tennessee Polka"	Red Foley	Decca
NR	22	2	"Have You Ever Been Lonely (Have You Ever Been Blue)"	Ernest Tubb	Decca
NR	24	5	"Mind Your Own Business"	Hank Williams	M-G-M
NR	27	3	"There's Not a Thing (I Wouldn't Do For You)"	Eddy Arnold	RCA Victor
NR	28	5	"Candy Kisses"	Cowboy Copas	King

== See also ==
- List of Billboard number-one country songs of 1949
- Billboard year-end top 30 singles of 1949
- 1949 in country music
