= List of Billboard number-one country songs of 1949 =

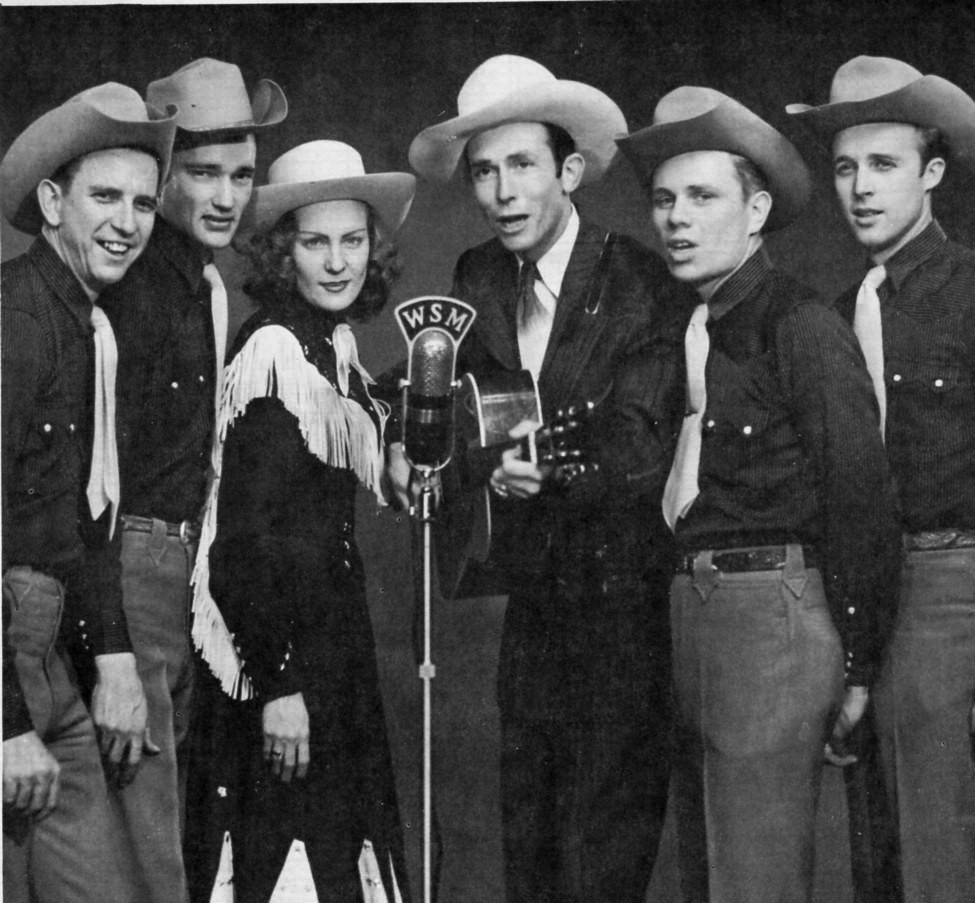
Hank Williams (third from right) and his Drifting Cowboys band reached number one for the first time in 1949.

In 1949 Billboard magazine published three charts covering the best-performing country music songs in the United States. At the start of the year, the magazine published two charts covering the genre: Most-Played Juke Box Folk Records, which had appeared in Billboard since 1944, and Best Selling Folk Retail Records, which had debuted in 1948. With effect from the issue of the magazine dated June 25, Billboard began using the term "country and western" for the first time in the titles of the charts, renaming the juke box chart to Most-Played Juke Box (Country & Western) Records and the best sellers chart to Best-Selling Retail Folk (Country & Western) Records. In December the magazine added a third country chart when it began publishing the Country & Western Records Most Played By Folk Disk Jockeys listing. All three charts are considered part of the lineage of the current Hot Country Songs chart, which was first published in 1958.

The artist with the most weeks at number one on the juke box chart was Eddy Arnold, who spent a total of twenty weeks in the top spot with five different songs. On the retail chart, singing cowboy actor Jimmy Wakely had the highest number of total weeks at number one, comprising ten weeks in the top spot with two solo singles and a further thirteen with "Slipping Around", a duet with Margaret Whiting. The ten consecutive weeks which "Slipping Around" spent atop the juke box chart from late October until the end of the year tied with "Don't Rob Another Man's Castle" by Eddy Arnold for the longest unbroken run of the year at number one on that chart, and its spell at number one on the retail chart was the longest run in the peak position on that listing. Arnold's song spent a total of twelve non-consecutive weeks at number one on the juke box chart, the highest cumulative total for any one song. On the retail chart, "Lovesick Blues" by Hank Williams and his Drifting Cowboys spent the most total weeks in the top spot, with sixteen non-consecutive weeks at number one. Wakely and Arnold were the only artists to take more than one song to number one in 1949, a feat which they each achieved on both the juke box and retail charts.

"Lovesick Blues" marked the first appearance at number one for Hank Williams, who died on January 1, 1953, at the age of 29 but has gone on to be regarded as one of the most important singers and songwriters in the history of country music; he was among the inaugural class of entrants to the Country Music Hall of Fame in 1961. Margaret Whiting also achieved a country chart-topper for the first time in 1949, as did Wayne Raney with "Why Don't You Haul Off and Love Me". Whiting was better known as a jazz singer, having sung with various orchestras since the early 1940s, but achieved a number of country successes between 1949 and 1951, all duets with Wakely. Raney, unusually, never achieved another chart entry after his first and only number one. In the year's final issue of Billboard, "Slipping Around" by Whiting and Wakely was at number one on both the juke box and retail charts. The number one song on the jockeys chart was "Mule Train" by Tennessee Ernie, the first number one for the artist later known as Tennessee Ernie Ford. It had been the only song to top the airplay-based listing since it was first published in the issue of Billboard dated December 10.

== Chart history ==
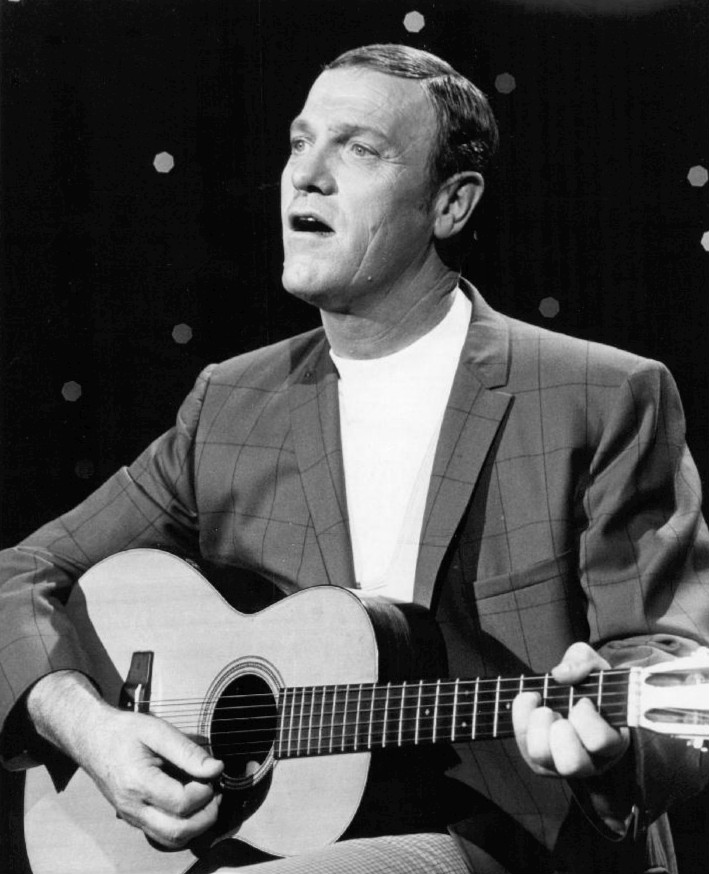
Eddy Arnold (pictured in later life) had five number ones on the juke box chart.

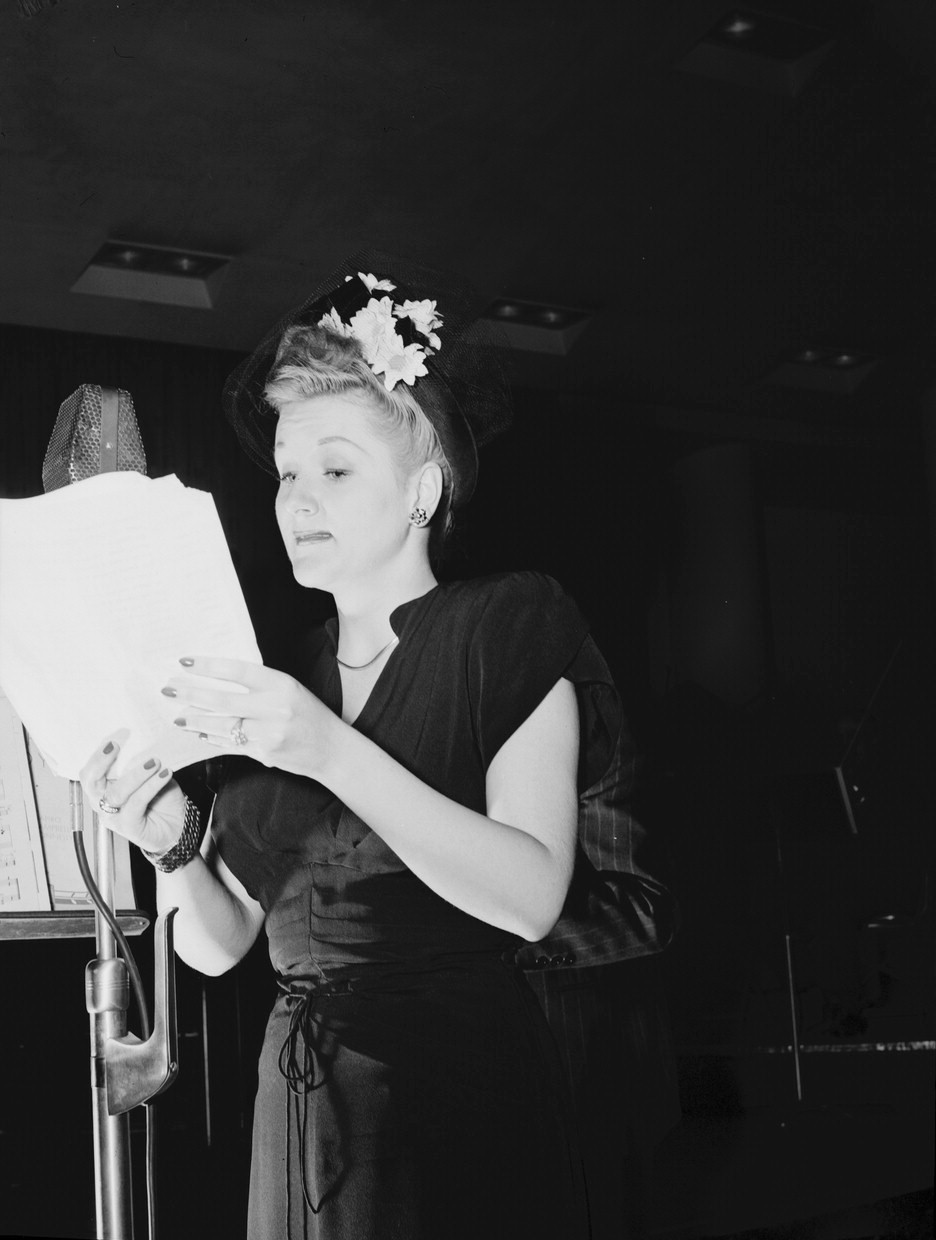
Margaret Whiting collaborated with Jimmy Wakely on "Slipping Around", which had lengthy runs at number one on both the juke box and retail charts.

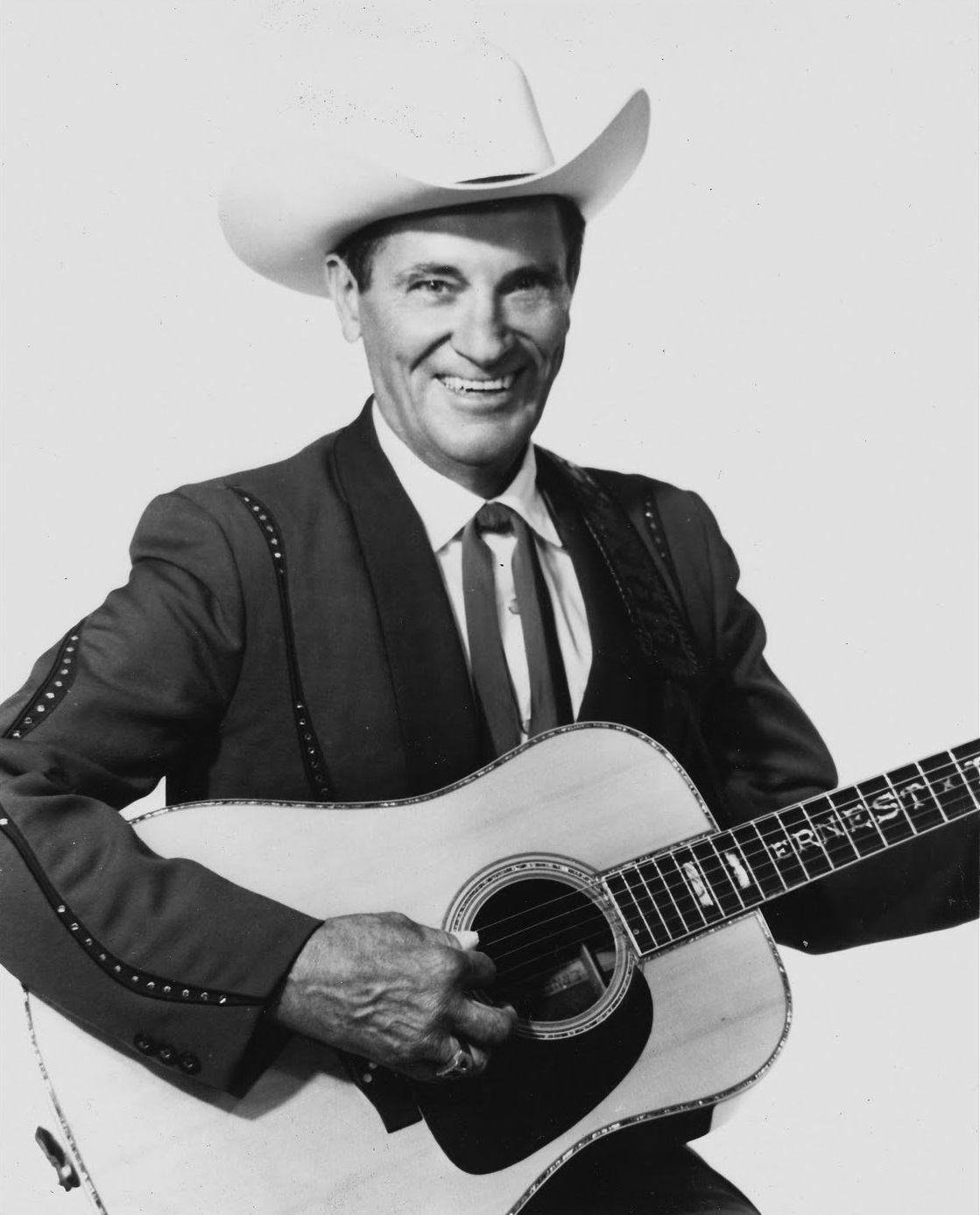
Ernest Tubb also took a version of "Slipping Around" to number one.

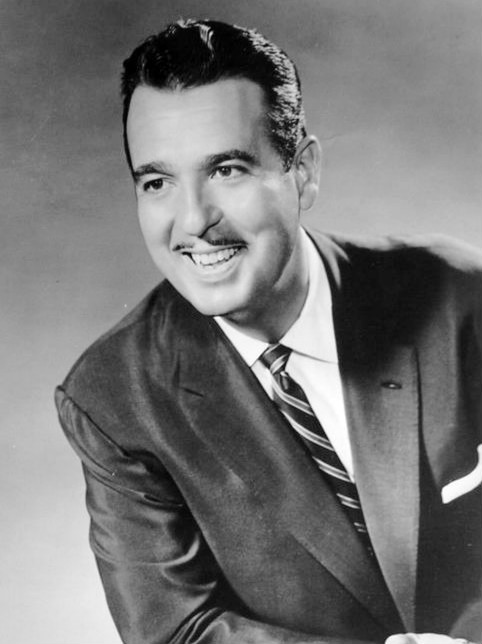
Tennessee Ernie had the first number one on the Jockeys chart.

Issue date	Juke Box		Best Sellers		Jockeys		Ref.
Issue date	Title	Artist(s)	Title	Artist(s)	Title	Artist(s)	Ref.
January 1	"One Has My Name (The Other Has My Heart)"	Jimmy Wakely	"One Has My Name (The Other Has My Heart)"	Jimmy Wakely	—N/a		
January 8	"Just a Little Lovin' (Will Go a Long Way)"	Eddy Arnold, the Tennessee Plowboy, and his Guitar	"One Has My Name (The Other Has My Heart)"	Jimmy Wakely	—N/a		
January 15	"One Has My Name (The Other Has My Heart)"	Jimmy Wakely	"One Has My Name (The Other Has My Heart)"	Jimmy Wakely	—N/a		
January 22	"I Love You So Much It Hurts"	Jimmy Wakely	"One Has My Name (The Other Has My Heart)"	Jimmy Wakely	—N/a		
January 29	"One Has My Name (The Other Has My Heart)"	Jimmy Wakely	"One Has My Name (The Other Has My Heart)"	Jimmy Wakely	—N/a		
February 5	"I Love You So Much It Hurts"	Jimmy Wakely	"One Has My Name (The Other Has My Heart)"	Jimmy Wakely	—N/a		
February 12	"I Love You So Much It Hurts"	Jimmy Wakely	"I Love You So Much It Hurts"	Jimmy Wakely	—N/a		
February 19	"Bouquet of Roses"	Eddy Arnold, the Tennessee Plowboy, and his Guitar	"I Love You So Much It Hurts"	Jimmy Wakely	—N/a		
February 26	"I Love You So Much It Hurts"	Jimmy Wakely	"I Love You So Much It Hurts"	Jimmy Wakely	—N/a		
March 5	"Don't Rob Another Man's Castle"	Eddy Arnold, the Tennessee Plowboy, and his Guitar	"Don't Rob Another Man's Castle"	Eddy Arnold, the Tennessee Plowboy, and his Guitar	—N/a		
March 12	"I Love You So Much It Hurts"	Jimmy Wakely	"I Love You So Much It Hurts"	Jimmy Wakely	—N/a		
March 19	"Tennessee Saturday Night"	Red Foley and the Cumberland Valley Boys	"Don't Rob Another Man's Castle"	Eddy Arnold, the Tennessee Plowboy, and his Guitar	—N/a		
March 26	"Don't Rob Another Man's Castle"	Eddy Arnold, the Tennessee Plowboy, and his Guitar	"Don't Rob Another Man's Castle"	Eddy Arnold, the Tennessee Plowboy, and his Guitar	—N/a		
April 2	"Don't Rob Another Man's Castle"	Eddy Arnold, the Tennessee Plowboy, and his Guitar	"Candy Kisses"	George Morgan	—N/a		
April 9	"Don't Rob Another Man's Castle"	Eddy Arnold, the Tennessee Plowboy, and his Guitar	"Candy Kisses"	George Morgan	—N/a		
April 16	"Don't Rob Another Man's Castle"	Eddy Arnold, the Tennessee Plowboy, and his Guitar	"Don't Rob Another Man's Castle"	Eddy Arnold, the Tennessee Plowboy, and his Guitar	—N/a		
April 23	"Don't Rob Another Man's Castle"	Eddy Arnold, the Tennessee Plowboy, and his Guitar	"Candy Kisses"	George Morgan	—N/a		
April 30	"Don't Rob Another Man's Castle"	Eddy Arnold, the Tennessee Plowboy, and his Guitar	"Don't Rob Another Man's Castle"	Eddy Arnold, the Tennessee Plowboy, and his Guitar	—N/a		
May 7	"Don't Rob Another Man's Castle"	Eddy Arnold, the Tennessee Plowboy, and his Guitar	"Lovesick Blues"	Hank Williams with his Drifting Cowboys	—N/a		
May 14	"Don't Rob Another Man's Castle"	Eddy Arnold, the Tennessee Plowboy, and his Guitar	"Don't Rob Another Man's Castle"	Eddy Arnold, the Tennessee Plowboy, and his Guitar	—N/a		
May 21	"Don't Rob Another Man's Castle"	Eddy Arnold, the Tennessee Plowboy, and his Guitar	"Lovesick Blues"	Hank Williams with his Drifting Cowboys	—N/a		
May 28	"Don't Rob Another Man's Castle"	Eddy Arnold, the Tennessee Plowboy, and his Guitar	"Lovesick Blues"	Hank Williams with his Drifting Cowboys	—N/a		
June 4	"Lovesick Blues"	Hank Williams with his Drifting Cowboys	"Lovesick Blues"	Hank Williams with his Drifting Cowboys	—N/a		
June 11	"Don't Rob Another Man's Castle"	Eddy Arnold, the Tennessee Plowboy, and his Guitar	"Lovesick Blues"	Hank Williams with his Drifting Cowboys	—N/a		
June 18	"One Kiss Too Many"	Eddy Arnold, the Tennessee Plowboy, and his Guitar	"Lovesick Blues"	Hank Williams with his Drifting Cowboys	—N/a		
June 25	"Lovesick Blues"	Hank Williams with his Drifting Cowboys	"Lovesick Blues"	Hank Williams with his Drifting Cowboys	—N/a		
July 2	"One Kiss Too Many"	Eddy Arnold, the Tennessee Plowboy, and his Guitar	"Lovesick Blues"	Hank Williams with his Drifting Cowboys	—N/a		
July 9	"Lovesick Blues"	Hank Williams with his Drifting Cowboys	"Lovesick Blues"	Hank Williams with his Drifting Cowboys	—N/a		
July 16	"Lovesick Blues"	Hank Williams with his Drifting Cowboys	"Lovesick Blues"	Hank Williams with his Drifting Cowboys	—N/a		
July 23	"One Kiss Too Many"	Eddy Arnold, the Tennessee Plowboy, and his Guitar	"Lovesick Blues"	Hank Williams with his Drifting Cowboys	—N/a		
July 30	"I'm Throwing Rice (At The Girl That I Love)"	Eddy Arnold, the Tennessee Plowboy, and his Guitar	"Lovesick Blues"	Hank Williams with his Drifting Cowboys	—N/a		
August 6	"Lovesick Blues"	Hank Williams with his Drifting Cowboys	"Lovesick Blues"	Hank Williams with his Drifting Cowboys	—N/a		
August 13	"Lovesick Blues"	Hank Williams with his Drifting Cowboys	"I'm Throwing Rice (At The Girl That I Love)"	Eddy Arnold, the Tennessee Plowboy, and his Guitar	—N/a		
August 20	"Lovesick Blues"	Hank Williams with his Drifting Cowboys	"I'm Throwing Rice (At The Girl That I Love)"	Eddy Arnold, the Tennessee Plowboy, and his Guitar	—N/a		
August 27	"I'm Throwing Rice (At The Girl That I Love)"	Eddy Arnold, the Tennessee Plowboy, and his Guitar	"I'm Throwing Rice (At The Girl That I Love)"	Eddy Arnold, the Tennessee Plowboy, and his Guitar	—N/a		
September 3	"Lovesick Blues"	Hank Williams with his Drifting Cowboys	"I'm Throwing Rice (At The Girl That I Love)"	Eddy Arnold, the Tennessee Plowboy, and his Guitar	—N/a		
September 10	"I'm Throwing Rice (At The Girl That I Love)"	Eddy Arnold, the Tennessee Plowboy, and his Guitar	"Why Don't You Haul Off and Love Me"	Wayne Raney	—N/a		
September 17	"Lovesick Blues"	Hank Williams with his Drifting Cowboys	"Lovesick Blues"	Hank Williams with his Drifting Cowboys	—N/a		
September 24	"Slipping Around"	Ernest Tubb	"Lovesick Blues"	Hank Williams with his Drifting Cowboys	—N/a		
October 1^{[a]}	"Why Don't You Haul Off and Love Me"	Wayne Raney	"Lovesick Blues"	Hank Williams with his Drifting Cowboys	—N/a		
October 1^{[a]}	"Lovesick Blues"	Hank Williams with his Drifting Cowboys	"Lovesick Blues"	Hank Williams with his Drifting Cowboys	—N/a		
October 8	"Slipping Around"	Margaret Whiting and Jimmy Wakely	"Slipping Around"	Margaret Whiting and Jimmy Wakely	—N/a		
October 15	"Why Don't You Haul Off and Love Me"	Wayne Raney	"Slipping Around"	Margaret Whiting and Jimmy Wakely	—N/a		
October 22	"Why Don't You Haul Off and Love Me"	Wayne Raney	"Slipping Around"	Margaret Whiting and Jimmy Wakely	—N/a		
October 29	"Slipping Around"	Margaret Whiting and Jimmy Wakely	"Slipping Around"	Margaret Whiting and Jimmy Wakely	—N/a		
November 5	"Slipping Around"	Margaret Whiting and Jimmy Wakely	"Slipping Around"	Margaret Whiting and Jimmy Wakely	—N/a		
November 12	"Slipping Around"	Margaret Whiting and Jimmy Wakely	"Slipping Around"	Margaret Whiting and Jimmy Wakely	—N/a		
November 19	"Slipping Around"	Margaret Whiting and Jimmy Wakely	"Slipping Around"	Margaret Whiting and Jimmy Wakely	—N/a		
November 26	"Slipping Around"	Margaret Whiting and Jimmy Wakely	"Slipping Around"	Margaret Whiting and Jimmy Wakely	—N/a		
December 3	"Slipping Around"	Margaret Whiting and Jimmy Wakely	"Slipping Around"	Margaret Whiting and Jimmy Wakely	—N/a		
December 10	"Slipping Around"	Margaret Whiting and Jimmy Wakely	"Slipping Around"	Margaret Whiting and Jimmy Wakely	"Mule Train"	Tennessee Ernie	
December 17	"Slipping Around"	Margaret Whiting and Jimmy Wakely	"Slipping Around"	Margaret Whiting and Jimmy Wakely	"Mule Train"	Tennessee Ernie	
December 24	"Slipping Around"	Margaret Whiting and Jimmy Wakely	"Slipping Around"	Margaret Whiting and Jimmy Wakely	"Mule Train"	Tennessee Ernie	
December 31	"Slipping Around"	Margaret Whiting and Jimmy Wakely	"Slipping Around"	Margaret Whiting and Jimmy Wakely	"Mule Train"	Tennessee Ernie	

a. Two songs tied for number one on the Juke Box chart.

== See also ==
- 1949 in music
- 1949 in country music
- List of artists who reached number one on the U.S. country chart
