= 1949 in country music =

This is a list of notable events in country music that took place in the year 1949.

== Events ==
- December 10 – Billboard begins a "Country & Western Records Most Played by Folk Disk Jockeys" chart – the first chart ever to track a song's popularity by radio airplay. The first No. 1 song on the new chart is "Mule Train" by Tennessee Ernie Ford. With the new chart, there are three charts gauging a song's popularity, with the sales and jukebox charts also being used.

== Top hits of the year ==
=== Number one hits ===
(As certified by Billboard magazine)

US	Single	Artist
January 22	"I Love You So Much It Hurts"	Jimmy Wakely
March 5	"Don't Rob Another Man's Castle"	Eddy Arnold
March 19	"Tennessee Saturday Night"	Red Foley and the Cumberland Valley Boys
April 2	"Candy Kisses"	George Morgan
May 7	"Lovesick Blues"	Hank Williams with His Drifting Cowboys
June 18	"One Kiss Too Many"	Eddy Arnold
July 30	"I'm Throwing Rice (At the Girl That I Love)"	Eddy Arnold
September 10	"Why Don't You Haul Off and Love Me"	Wayne Raney
September 24	"Slipping Around"	Ernest Tubb
October 8	"Slipping Around"	Margaret Whiting and Jimmy Wakely
December 10	"Mule Train"	Tennessee Ernie Ford

Note: Several songs were simultaneous No. 1 hits on the separate "Most Played Juke Box Folk (later Country & Western) Records," "Best Selling Retail Folk (later Country & Western) Records) and – starting December 10 – "Country & Western Records Most Played by Folk Disk Jockeys" charts.

== Top country records of 1949 ==
The following songs appeared in The Billboard's 'Best-Selling Retail Folk Records' and 'Most-Played Juke Box Folk Records' charts during 1949. Each week fifteen points were awarded to the number one record, then nine points for number two, eight points for number three, and so on. The total points a record earned determined its year-end rank. Additional information was obtained from the "Discography of American Historical Recordings" website, 'Cashbox', and other sources as noted.

Rank	Artist	Title	Label	Recorded	Released	Chart Positions
1	Hank Williams with His Drifting Cowboys	"Lovesick Blues"	MGM 10352	December 22, 1948	February 11, 1949	US Billboard 1949 #253, US #24 for 1 weeks, 1 total weeks, US Hillbilly 1949 #1, USHB #1 for 16 weeks, 42 total weeks, 725 points, CashBox #3, Grammy Hall of Fame 2011, 1,000,000 sales
2	Margaret Whiting and Jimmy Wakely	"Slippin' Around"	Capitol 40224	September 5, 1949	September 10, 1949	US Billboard 1949 #10, US #1 for 3 weeks, 23 total weeks, US Hillbilly 1949 #2, USHB #1 for 16 weeks, 32 total weeks, 633 points
3	Eddy Arnold, The Tennessee Plowboy and His Guitar	"Don't Rob Another Man's Castle"	RCA Victor 21-0002	December 21, 1948	January 21, 1949	US Billboard 1949 #234, US #23 for 1 week, 2 total weeks, US Hillbilly 1949 #3, USHB #1 for 12 weeks, 31 total weeks, 454 points
4	Jimmy Wakely	"I Love You So Much It Hurts"	Capitol 15243	August 3, 1949	October 8, 1949	US Billboard 1948 #170, US #21 for 1 week, 8 total weeks, US Hillbilly 1949 #4, USHB #1 for 5 weeks, 26 total weeks, 402 points
5	Red Foley and The Cumberland Valley Boys	"Tennessee Saturday Night"	Decca 46136	August 12, 1947	September 14, 1948	US Hillbilly 1949 #5, USHB #1 for 1 weeks, 40 total weeks, 343 points
6	Wayne Raney	"Why Don't You Haul Off and Love Me"	King 791	April 5, 1949	June 1949	US Billboard 1949 #218, US #22 for 1 week, 4 total weeks, US Hillbilly 1949 #6, USHB #1 for 3 weeks, 21 total weeks, 318 points
7	Eddy Arnold, The Tennessee Plowboy and His Guitar	"I'm Throwing Rice (At The Girl That I Love)"	RCA Victor 21-0083	April 5, 1949	June 10, 1949	US Billboard 1949 #178, US #19 for 1 week, 2 total weeks, US Hillbilly 1949 #7, USHB #1 for 3 weeks, 21 total weeks, 314 points
8	The Delmore Brothers	"Blues Stay Away From Me"	King 803	May 6, 1949	August 31, 1949	US Hillbilly 1949 #8, USHB #1 for 1 weeks, 23 total weeks, CashBox #10, 296 points, Grammy Hall of Fame 2007
9	Hank Williams with His Drifting Cowboys	"Wedding Bells"	MGM 10401	March 20, 1949	April 23, 1949	US Hillbilly 1949 #9, USHB #2 for 2 weeks, 29 total weeks, 294 points
10	George Morgan	"Candy Kisses"	Columbia 20547	January 16, 1949	February 1949	US Billboard 1949 #157, US #17 for 1 week, 1 total weeks, US Hillbilly 1949 #10, USHB #1 for 3 weeks, 21 total weeks, 253 points
11	Eddy Arnold, The Tennessee Plowboy and His Guitar	"One Kiss Too Many"	RCA Victor 21-0051	December 22, 1948	April 22, 1949	US Billboard 1949 #238, US #23 for 1 week, 1 total weeks, US Hillbilly 1949 #11, USHB #1 for 3 weeks, 22 total weeks, 226 points
12	Ernest Tubb	"Slipping Around"	Decca 46173	June 12, 1949	September 24, 1949	US Billboard 1949 #157, US #17 for 1 week, 1 total weeks, US Hillbilly 1949 #12, USHB #1 for 1 weeks, 20 total weeks, 210 points
13	Eddy Arnold, The Tennessee Plowboy and His Guitar	"The Echo of Your Footsteps"	RCA Victor 21-0051	December 20, 1948	April 22, 1949	US Hillbilly 1949 #13, USHB #2 for 3 weeks, 19 total weeks, 176 points
14	Tennessee Ernie	"Mule Train"	Capitol 40258	October 18, 1949	November 28, 1949	US Billboard 1949 #84, US #9 for 1 week, 9 total weeks, US Hillbilly 1949 #14, USHB #1 for 4 weeks, 10 total weeks, 160 points
15	Margaret Whiting and Jimmy Wakely	"I'll Never Slip Around Again"	Capitol 40246	September 5, 1949	October 10, 1949	US Billboard 1949 #69, US #8 for 3 weeks, 10 total weeks, US Hillbilly 1949 #16, USHB #2 for 3 weeks, 13 total weeks, 145 points
16	Hank Williams with His Drifting Cowboys	"My Bucket's Got a Hole in It"	MGM 10560	December 22, 1948	February 11, 1949	US Billboard 1949 #, US #1 for 8 weeks, 24 total weeks, US Hillbilly 1949 #17, USHB #2 for 1 weeks, 12 total weeks, 125 points
17	Red Foley	"Tennessee Border"	Decca 46151	January 25, 1949	February 13, 1949	US Hillbilly 1949 #18, USHB #3 for 1 week, 20 total weeks, 124 points
18	Andrews Sisters and Ernest Tubb	"I'm Bitin' My Fingernails and Thinking of You"	Decca 24592	February 15, 1949	March 10, 1949	US Billboard 1949 #304, US #29 for 1 week, 1 total weeks, US Hillbilly 1949 #19, USHB #2 for 1 week, 12 total weeks, 112 points
19	Tennessee Ernie	"Anticipation Blues"	Capitol 40258	October 16, 1949	November 28, 1949	US Hillbilly 1949 #20, USHB #3 for 3 weeks, 11 total weeks, 101 points
20	George Morgan	"Please Don't Let Me Love You"	Columbia 20547	January 16, 1949	February 1949	US Hillbilly 1949 #21, USHB #4 for 2 weeks, 14 total weeks, 87 points
21	Red Foley	"Tennessee Polka"	Decca 46170	April 28, 1949	June 1949	US Hillbilly 1949 #22, USHB #4 for 3 weeks, 13 total weeks, 76 points
22	Ernest Tubb	"Blue Christmas"	Decca 46186	August 26, 1949	October 26, 1949	US Billboard 1949 #263, US #27 for 1 week, 1 total weeks, US Hillbilly 1949 #23, USHB #1 for 1 weeks, 6 total weeks, 65 points
23	Eddy Arnold, The Tennessee Plowboy and His Guitar	"There's Not A Thing (I Wouldn't Do For You)"	RCA Victor 21-0002	August 20, 1947	January 21, 1949	US Hillbilly 1949 #24, USHB #3 for 1 week, 10 total weeks, 57 points
24	Kenny Roberts	"I Never See Maggie Alone"	Coral 64012	May 3, 1949	July 1949	US Hillbilly 1949 #25, USHB #4 for 1 weeks, 11 total weeks, 56 points
25	Gene Autry and the Pinafores	"Rudolph the Red-Nosed Reindeer"	Columbia 38610	June 27, 1949	September 1, 1949	US Billboard 1949 #17, US #1 for 1 weeks, 13 total weeks, US Hillbilly 1949 #26, USHB #1 for 4 weeks, 5 total weeks, 55 points, Grammy Hall of Fame 1985, 7,000,000 sold by 1969
30	Ernest Tubb	"Have You Ever Been Lonely? (Have You Ever Been Blue)"	Decca 46144	December 11, 1948	February 19, 1949	US Hillbilly 1949 #30, USHB #2 for 1 weeks, 10 total weeks, 44 points
31	Hank Williams with His Drifting Cowboys	"Mind Your Own Business"	MGM 10461	March 1, 1949	July 9, 1949	US Hillbilly 1949 #31, USHB #5 for 1 weeks, 11 total weeks, 36 points
40	Hank Williams with His Drifting Cowboys	"You're Gonna Change (Or I'm Gonna Leave)"	MGM 10506	March 1, 1949	September 9, 1949	US Hillbilly 1949 #40, USHB #4 for 1 weeks, 9 total weeks, 24 points
43	Vaughn Monroe and His Orchestra	"Riders in the Sky (A Cowboy Legend)"	RCA Victor 20-3411	March 14, 1949	May 14, 1949	US Billboard 1949 #1, US #1 for 12 weeks, 22 total weeks, US Hillbilly 1949 #43, USHB #2 for 1 weeks, 3 total weeks, 15 points, CashBox #1, 1,000,000 sales
55	Hank Williams with His Drifting Cowboys	"Never Again (Will I Knock on Your Door)"	MGM 10352	December 11, 1946	July 9, 1949	US Hillbilly 1949 #55, USHB #6 for 1 weeks, 2 total weeks, 8 points
61	Gene Autry	"Here Comes Santa Claus (Right Down Santa Claus Lane)"	Columbia 20377	August 28, 1947	November 7, 1949	US Billboard 1949 #248, US #24 for 1 week, 1 total weeks, US Hillbilly 1949 #61, USHB #8 for 1 week, 3 total weeks, 3 points, 1,000,000 sales

== Births ==
- January 6 – Joey Miskulin, also known as "Joey the Cowpolka King", member of Riders in the Sky.
- January 22 – J.P. Pennington, member of the 1980s group Exile.
- May 26 – Hank Williams, Jr., son of country music pioneer Hank Williams, who became a star in his own right, fusing elements of honky tonk and blues with rock.
- June 17 – Russell Smith, American singer-songwriter (Amazing Rhythm Aces, died 2019).
- August 23 – Woody Paul, "King of the Cowboy Fiddlers" member of Riders in the Sky.
- August 25 – Henry Paul, lead singer of the 1990s country group BlackHawk.
- August 27 – Jeff Cook, member of Alabama (died 2022).
- October 23 – Nick Tosches, American journalist, music critic and writer (Country), (died 2019).
- December 13 – Randy Owen, member of Alabama.

== Deaths ==
- December 11 – Fiddlin' John Carson, 81, one of country music's first popular recording artist on a nationwide basis.
