= The Complete Hank Williams =

Box set by Hank Williams
- Released: September 22, 1998
- Recorded: December 11, 1946 – September 23, 1952
- Genres: Country, honky-tonk, blues
- Length: 559:06
- Label: Mercury
- Producers: Colin Escott, Kira Florita, Fred Rose, Kyle Young

Hank Williams chronology
The Best of Hank Williams (1998)	The Complete Hank Williams (1998)	There's Nothing as Sweet as My Baby (1999)

Professional ratings
Review scores
Source	Rating
Allmusic	link
Entertainment Weekly	(B+) link
Encyclopedia of Popular Music	5/5 stars

The Complete Hank Williams is a 1998 box set collecting almost all of the recorded works of country music legend Hank Williams, from his first recorded track in 1947 to the last session prior to his untimely death in 1953 at the age of 29. While a number of live and overdubbed songs are excluded, (Note: The producers of the compilation excepted songs based on poor condition of masters, indistinct variants of other tracks and masters legally entailed. See The Official Hank Williams website.) the ten disc collection contains 225 tracks, including studio sessions, live performances and demos. Among those 225 songs are 33 hit singles and 53 previously unreleased tracks.

== Reception ==
The New York Times hailed the release of the compilation, timed to coincide with what would have been Williams' 75th birthday, as "an important event," indicating "that it is impossible to understand contemporary country music, or popular music for that matter, without addressing Hank Williams's legacy". In 1999, the compilation won two Grammy awards, for "Best Historical Album" and "Best Recording Package—Boxed". In 2003, Rolling Stone listed the compilation at #225 in its list of "Rolling Stone's 500 Greatest Albums of All Time".

== Packaging ==
In addition to the 10 discs, the box set includes a book entitled The Music which holds the CDs and incorporates 30 pages of information about the songs, including photographs of performance and information on charting. It also contains a 120-page book entitled The Stories which includes essays and notes about Williams and his work as well as assembling comments about Williams from other musicians, including Alan Jackson, Tony Bennett, and Mike Mills of R.E.M. Art in the package includes eight postcards, over a hundred photos, replicas of Williams' handwritten lyrics for several songs and a copy of the January 1, 1953, telegraph in which Williams' mother announced his death to his sister.

== Track listing ==
Unless otherwise noted, all songs composed by Hank Williams.

=== Disc one - The Sterling and MGM Records Sessions: Part One - 12/11/46 through 11/07/47 ===
1. "Calling You" – 2:53
2. "Never Again (Will I Knock on Your Door)" – 2:53
3. "Wealth Won't Save Your Soul" – 2:45
4. "When God Comes and Gathers His Jewels" – 2:48
5. "I Don't Care (if Tomorrow Never Comes)" – 2:46
6. "My Love for You (Has Turned to Hate)" – 2:39
7. "Honky Tonkin'" – 2:45
8. "Pan Americans" – 2:47
9. "Move It on Over" – 2:44
10. "I Saw the Light" – 2:43
11. "(Last Night) I Heard You Crying in Your Sleep" – 2:42
12. "Six More Miles (To the Graveyard)" – 2:46
13. "Fly Trouble" (Bunny Biggs, Fred Rose, Honey Wilds) – 2:42
14. "I'm Satisfied With You" (Rose) – 2:33
15. "On the Banks of the Old Pontchartrain" (Ramona Vincent, Hank Williams) – 2:50
16. "Rootie Tootie" (Rose) – 2:44
17. "I Can't Get You off of My Mind" – 2:49
18. "I'm a Long Gone Daddy" – 2:48
19. "Honky Tonkin'" – 2:42
20. "My Sweet Love Ain't Around" – 2:42
21. "The Blues Come Around" – 2:40
22. "A Mansion on the Hill" (Rose, Williams) – 2:33

=== Disc two - The MGM Sessions: Part Two - 11/07/47 through 1/09/50 ===
1. "I'll Be a Bachelor 'Til I Die" – 2:35
2. "There'll Be No Teardrops Tonight" – 2:46
3. "Lovesick Blues" (Cliff Friend, Irving Mills) – 2:45
4. "Lost on the River" – 2:32
5. "I Heard My Mother Praying for Me" (Audrey Williams, Williams) – 2:33
6. "Lost Highway" (Leon Payne) – 2:40
7. "May You Never Be Alone" – 2:48
8. "Dear Brother" – 2:44
9. "Jesus Remembered Me" – 2:50
10. "Honky Tonk Blues" – 2:37
11. "Mind Your Own Business" – 2:53
12. "You're Gonna Change (Or I'm Gonna Leave)" – 2:56
13. "My Son Calls Another Man Daddy" – 2:33
14. "Wedding Bells" (Claude Boone) – 2:53
15. "I've Just Told Mama Goodbye" (Curly Kinsey, Slim Sweet) – 2:53
16. "I'm So Lonesome I Could Cry" – 2:45
17. "A House Without Love" – 2:52
18. "I Just Don't Like This Kind of Livin'" – 2:47
19. "My Bucket's Got a Hole in It (Alternate Take)" – 2:04
20. "My Bucket's Got a Hole in It" – 2:31
21. "Long Gone Lonesome Blues" – 2:36
22. "Why Don't You Love Me (Like You Used to Do)?" – 2:22
23. "Why Should We Try Anymore" – 2:36
24. "My Son Calls Another Man Daddy" – 2:32

=== Disc three - The MGM Sessions: Part Three - 1/10/50 through 6/01/51 ===
1. "Too Many Parties and Too Many Pals" (Mort Dixon, Ray Henderson, Billy Rose) – 2:57
2. "Beyond the Sunset" (Blanche Brock, Virgil Brock, Albert Kennedy) – 2:58
3. "The Funeral" – 3:03
4. "Everything's Okay" – 2:48
5. "They'll Never Take Her Love from Me" (Payne) – 2:43
6. "Nobody's Lonesome for Me" – 2:29
7. "Moanin' the Blues" – 2:22
8. "Help Me Understand" – 2:54
9. "No, No Joe" (Rose) – 2:26
10. "Cold, Cold Heart" – 2:42
11. "Dear John" (Aubrie Gass, Tex Ritter) – 2:33
12. "Just Waitin'" (Bob Gazzaway, Williams) – 2:38
13. "Men With Broken Hearts" – 3:08
14. "I Can't Help It (If I'm Still in Love With You)" – 2:22
15. "Howlin' at the Moon" – 2:41
16. "Hey, Good Lookin'" – 2:53
17. "My Heart Would Know" – 2:24
18. "The Pale Horse and His Rider" (John Bailes, Irving Staggs) – 2:51
19. "A Home in Heaven" – 2:28
20. "Ramblin' Man" – 3:01
21. "Picture from Life's Other Side" – 2:49
22. "I've Been Down That Road Before" – 2:53
23. "I Dreamed About Mama Last Night" (Rose) – 2:58

=== Disc four - The MGM Sessions: Part Four - 8/10/51 through 9/23/52 ===
1. "I'd Still Want You" – 2:57
2. "(I Heard That) Lonesome Whistle" (Jimmie Davis, Williams) – 2:26
3. "Crazy Heart" (Maurice Murray, Rose) – 2:25
4. "Half as Much" (Curley Williams) – 2:41
5. "I'd Still Want You" – 2:34
6. "Baby, We're Really in Love" – 2:31
7. "I'm Sorry for You, My Friend" – 2:40
8. "Honky Tonk Blues" – 2:09
9. "Let's Turn Back the Years" – 2:21
10. "Window Shopping" (Marcel Joseph) – 2:30
11. "Jambalaya (On the Bayou)" – 2:50
12. "Settin' the Woods on Fire" (Ed G. Nelson, Rose) – 2:34
13. "I'll Never Get Out of This World Alive" (Rose, Williams) – 2:24
14. "You Win Again" – 2:34
15. "I Won't Be Home No More" – 2:43
16. "Be Careful of Stones That You Throw" – 2:57
17. "Please Make up Your Mind" – 2:43
18. "I Could Never Be Ashamed of You" – 2:42
19. "Your Cheatin' Heart" – 2:40
20. "Kaw-Liga" (Rose, Williams) – 2:31
21. "Take These Chains from My Heart" (Hy Heath, Rose) – 2:35

=== Disc five - The Montgomery Demos and Radio Performances ===
1. "Happy Rovin' Cowboy" (Bob Nolan) – 2:36
2. "Freight Train Blues" (traditional) – 1:15
3. "San Antonio Rose" (Bob Wills) – 2:10
4. "I'm Not Coming Home Anymore" – 2:51
5. "I Ain't Gonna Love You Anymore" (Ernest Tubb) – 1:28
6. "Won't You Sometimes Think of Me" – 1:56
7. "Why Should I Cry" – 1:50
8. "I Watched My Dream World Crumble Like Clay" – 1:48
9. "I Told a Lie to My Heart" – 2:18
10. "Mother Is Gone" – 2:28
11. "In My Dreams You Still Belong to Me" – 2:20
12. "We're Getting Closer to the Grave Each Day" – 2:35
13. "I'm Going Home" – 1:25
14. "Calling You" – 1:53
15. "Pan American" – 2:05
16. "Wealth Won't Save Your Soul" – 2:31
17. "Honky Tonk Blues" – 2:00
18. "A Home in Heaven" – 2:03
19. "You Broke Your Own Heart" – 2:03
20. "I'm So Tired of It All" – 2:23

=== Disc six - The Shreveport Radio Performances: Part One, Vocal & Guitar ===
1. "You Caused It All by Telling Lies" (Clyde Moody) – 1:36
2. "Faded Love and Winter Roses" (Rose) – 1:57
3. "Please Don't Let Me Love You" (Ralph Jones) – 2:15
4. "There's No Room in My Heart for the Blues" (Rose, Zeb Turner) – 2:14
5. "I Wish I Had a Nickel" (W.S. Barnhart, Tommy Sutton) – 1:42
6. "The Waltz of the Wind" (Rose) – 2:06
7. "At the First Fall of Snow" (Rose) – 3:11
8. "Leave Me Alone With the Blues" (Joe Pope) – 2:16
9. "I'm Free at Last" (Tubb) – 2:20
10. "Blue Love (In My Heart)" (Floyd Jenkins) – 2:03
11. "It Just Don't Matter Now" (Tubb) – 2:26
12. "Little Paper Boy" (Jim Anglin, Johnnie Wright) – 3:00
13. "Someday You'll Call My Name" (Jean Branch, Eddie Hill) – 2:10
14. "The Battle of Armageddon" (Roy Acuff, Odell McLeod) – 2:27
15. "No One Will Ever Know" (Mel Foree, Rose) – 2:16
16. "With Tears in My Eyes" (Paul Howard) – 2:12
17. "Thank God" (Rose) – 2:16
18. "Rock My Cradle Once Again" (Johnny Bond, Billy Folger) – 3:02
19. "Don't Do It, Darling" (Zeke Manners) – 1:51

=== Disc seven - The Shreveport Radio Performances: Part Two... Plus the Shreveport Demos ===
1. "Rockin' Chair Money" (Bill Carlisle, Lonnie Glosson) – 2:05
2. "Cool Water" (Bob Nolan) – 3:43
3. "Tennessee Border" (Jimmy Work) – 1:52
4. "First Year Blues" (Tubb) – 2:24
5. "My Main Trial Is Yet to Come" (J.L. Frank, Pee Wee King) – 1:56
6. "Wait for the Light to Shine" (Rose) – 2:40
7. "We Live in Two Different Worlds" (Rose) – 1:57
8. "Roly Poly" (Rose) – 2:00
9. "Swing Wide Your Gate of Love" (Hank Thompson) – 2:21
10. "Dixie Cannonball" (Gene Autry, Red Foley, Vaughn Horton) – 2:22
11. "Sundown and Sorrow" (Frank, King) – 1:21
12. "The Devil's Train" (Cliff Carlisle, Mel Foree) – 2:58
13. "The Old Home" (Jackie Earls) – 2:41
14. "Alone and Forsaken" – 1:59
15. "Heaven Holds All My Treasures" – 2:37
16. "Lost on the River" – 2:17
17. "A House of Gold" – 2:14
18. "Singing Waterfall" – 2:11
19. "Dear Brother" – 2:27
20. "'Neath a Cold Gray Tomb of Stone" (Foree, Williams) – 2:41
21. "Time Has Proven I Was Wrong" (Foree, Curley Williams, Williams) – 1:13
22. "No, Not Now" (Foree, C. Williams, Williams) – 2:09
23. "When You're Tired of Breaking Others Hearts" (C. Williams, Williams) – 1:08
24. "Honey Do You Love Me, Huh?" (C. Williams, Williams) – 1:15

=== Disc eight - The Nashville Demos: Part One ===
1. "California Zephyr" – 1:56
2. "Your Cheatin' Heart" – 2:33
3. "You Better Keep It on Your Mind" (Vic McAlpin, Williams) – 2:23
4. "How Can You Refuse Him Now?" – 2:34
5. "Low Down Blues" – 1:20
6. "Ten Little Numbers" (Acuff) – 1:16
7. "Thy Burdens Are Greater Than Mine" (King, Redd Stewart) – 3:28
8. "Last Night I Dreamed of Heaven" – 1:20
9. "I Ain't Got Nothin' But Time" – 2:40
10. "Message to My Mother" – 4:04
11. "Fool About You" (Ralph C. Hutchinson) – 1:24
12. "I'm Going Home" – 1:51
13. "Jambalaya (On the Bayou)" – 1:51
14. "Ready to Go Home" – 1:45
15. "Kaw-Liga" (Rose, Williams) – 2:38
16. "I Could Never Be Ashamed of You" – 2:17
17. "Angel of Death" – 2:20
18. "All the Love I Ever Had" – 1:46
19. "We're Getting Closer to the Grave Each Day" – 2:06
20. "The Log Train" – 2:21
21. "How to Write Folk & Western Music to Sell" – 1:54

=== Disc nine - The Nashville Demos: Part Two - Hank Pitching Songs; Plus Rare Radio Performances ===
1. "There's a Tear in My Beer" – 2:46
2. "The Alabama Waltz" – 1:05
3. "Jesus Died for Me" – 2:26
4. "A Teardrop on a Rose" – 2:27
5. "Jesus Is Calling" (Charlie Monroe, Williams) – 1:36
6. "Wearing Out Your Walkin' Shoes" – 1:35
7. "When the Book of Life Is Read" – 1:24
8. "There's Nothing as Sweet as My Baby" – 1:59
9. "(I'm Gonna) Sing, Sing, Sing" – 1:48
10. "I Can't Escape from You" – 2:15
11. "Weary Blues from Waitin'" – 2:26
12. "Are You Walkin' and Talkin' for the Lord" – 2:42
13. "If You'll Be a Baby to Me" – 0:56
14. "'Neath a Cold Gray Tomb of Stone" (Foree, Williams) – 2:50
15. "Lost Highway" (Leon Payne) – 4:03
16. "I'm a Long Gone Daddy" – 5:40
17. "Long Gone Lonesome Blues" – 3:26
18. "Help Me Understand" – 6:18
19. "When God Dips His Love in My Heart" (Cleavant Derricks) – 2:23
20. "They'll Never Take Her Love from Me" (Payne) – 4:33
21. "Are You Walkin' and Talkin' for the Lord" – 2:15
22. "Honky Tonkin'" – 2:13
23. "I Cried Again" (Autry Inman) – 3:11
24. "The Wild Side of Life" (Arlie Carter, William Warren) – 2:55
25. "Something Got a Hold of Me" (A.P. Carter) – 2:29
26. "Drifting Too Far from the Shore" (Charles E. Moody) – 3:13

=== Disc ten - Radio, Television, and Concert Performances ===
1. "Lovesick Blues" (Friend, Mills) – 3:11
2. "Move It on Over" – 2:52
3. "You're Gonna Change (Or I'm Gonna Leave)" – 2:45
4. "I Just Don't Like This Kind of Livin'" – 3:26
5. "Talk With Minnie Pearl" – 2:56
6. "They'll Never Take Her Love from Me" (Payne) – 1:34
7. "Long Gone Lonesome Blues" – 3:31
8. "Why Don't You Love Me (Like You Used to Do)?" – 1:43
9. "Talk With Minnie Pearl" – 3:37
10. "Moanin' the Blues" – 3:19
11. "Nobody's Lonesome for Me" – 2:30
12. "Dear John" (Gass, Ritter) – 2:08
13. "Hey, Good Lookin'" – 2:46
14. "Honky Tonk Blues" (Williams) – 1:54
15. "Let the Spirit Descend" (traditional) – 2:05
16. "Cold, Cold Heart" – 2:31
17. "Baby, We're Really in Love" – 1:36
18. "The Old Country Church" (John Whitfield Vaughn) – 2:35
19. "A Tramp on the Street" (Grady Cole, Hazel Cole) – 3:48
20. "I'll Have a New Body (I'll Have a New Life)" (traditional) – 2:25
21. "I Want to Live and Love" (Gene Sullivan, Wiley Walker) – 2:25
22. "Where the Soul of Man Never Dies" (William Lee Golden, Wayne Raney) – 1:47
23. "The Prodigal Son" (Floyd Jenkins) – 2:57
24. "I Can't Help It (If I'm Still in Love With You)" – 1:57
25. "The Apology #2" – 2:49

== Personnel ==
=== Performance ===
- Anita Carter – performer
- Grant Turner – performer
- Kitty Wells – performer
- Audrey Williams – performer
- Hank Williams – guitar, vocals
- Johnnie Wright – performer

=== Production ===
- Charlie Adams – photographer
- Craig Allen – design
- Daniel Cooper – liner notes
- Don Daily – photography
- Colin Escott – producer, liner notes, photography
- Kira Florita – producer, editing, project coordinator
- Jerry Joyner – design
- Jim Kemp – art direction
- Griffin Norman – photography
- Joseph M. Palmaccio – mastering engineer
- Fred Rose – producer
- Tom "Curly" Ruff – mastering engineer
- Billy Smith – photography
- Alan Stoker – restoration
- Marty Stuart – photography
- Virginia Team – art direction
- Richard Weize – photography
- Jett Williams – photography
- Kyle Young – compilation producer
