= Bob Atcher =

American country musician (1914–1993)

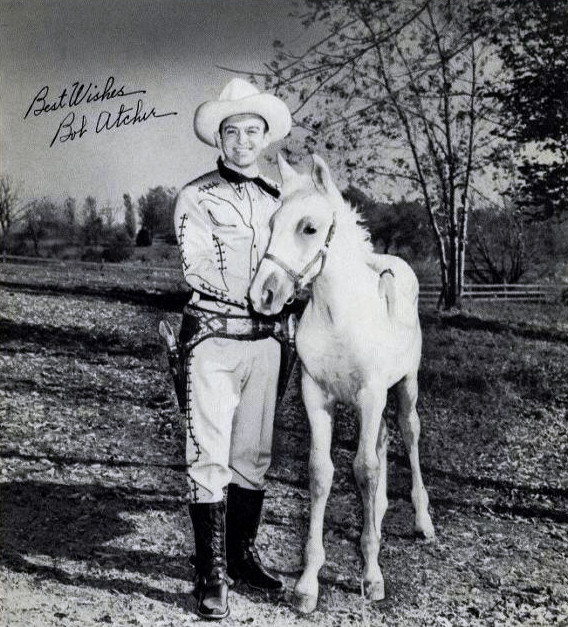
- Atcher as the host of Meadow Gold Ranch, a children's show on WENR-TV in the early 1950s.

Background information
- Born: James Robert Owen Atcher; May 11, 1914; Hardin County, Kentucky, US
- Died: October 31, 1993 (aged 79) Prospect, Kentucky, US
- Genres: Country
- Instruments: Guitar, fiddle
- Years active: 1937-1966
- Labels: ARC, Okeh Records, Columbia Records, Capitol Records, Kapp Records

James Robert Owen "Bob" Atcher (May 11, 1914 – October 31, 1993) was an American country musician.

== Biography ==
Atcher was born in Hardin County, Kentucky, United States, and learned violin and guitar from his father, who was a champion fiddle player. He started out on radio in Louisville on WHAS, and was offered spots on a number of other stations in the American South and Midwest. In 1939, he was offered a regular gig on Chicago station WBBM which was broadcast nationally by CBS. The show made him a national star, and he signed with ARC just before CBS bought the company. After the purchase Atcher was transferred to Okeh Records and then to Columbia Records, both CBS subsidiaries.

=== Productive years ===
Between 1939 and 1942, he recorded many duets with Loeta Applegate, who went by the stage name "Bonnie Blue Eyes" Among these was the first No. 1 of Jimmie Davis' "You Are My Sunshine". He scored two solo hits with versions of "I'm Thinking Tonight of My Blue Eyes" and Ernest Tubb's "Walking the Floor Over You". On May 5, 1942, in his last session before joining the United States Army, he and Bonnie Blue Eyes recorded "Pins and Needles (In My Heart)" by Fred Rose, which charted for most of 1943, and went on to become a standard for the wartime era.

=== Post WWII ===
After returning to performing in 1946, he charted hits, including "Why Don't You Haul Off and Love Me" and "I Must Have Been Wrong". Bob's younger brother Randy Atcher also appeared on some of his records. In 1948, Atcher signed on with WLS and became a performer on their National Barn Dance. He also released a long play (LP) entitled Early American Folk Songs in 1948, which was among the earliest LPs released by Columbia. In 1950, he signed with Capitol Records, and later in the 1950s moved to Kapp Records. In 1950, he recorded "Christmas Island" with the Dinning Sisters. He continued with the Barn Dance well into the 1960s, and re-signed to Columbia that decade, re-recording many of his songs in stereo.

Atcher was the star of Junior Rodeo, a television program that debuted on ABC on November 15, 1952. Broadcast on alternate Saturday mornings from Chicago, the Western children's program had members of the audience participating in follow-the-leader activities.

Atcher, like Gene Autry, was a shrewd businessman, and bought several businesses and invested in banking, with the proceeds from his career. He was also the mayor of Schaumburg, Illinois from 1959 to 1975. He died on Halloween day in 1993.

Atcher Pool in Schaumburg is named after him. Shortly before he died, the Municipal Center in Schaumburg was named in his honor. The center was dedicated in March 1995.

"You Are My Sunshine"
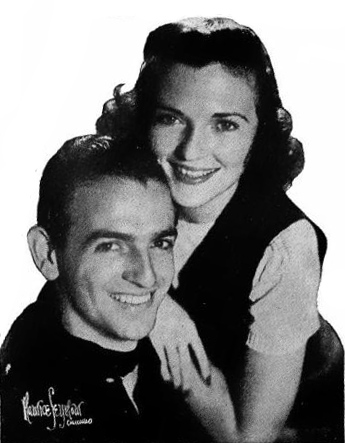

Single by Bob Atcher and Bonnie Blue Eyes
- B-side: "Crying Myself To Sleep"
- Published: January 30, 1940 Southern Music Publishing Co Inc
- Released: February 1940
- Recorded: January 17, 1940
- Studio: Stevens Hotel, 720 South Michigan Avenue Chicago, Ill
- Genre: Hillbilly
- Length: 2:40
- Label: Vocalion 05370
- Songwriters: Jimmie Davis and Charles Mitchell

== Hillbilly-folk chart hits ==
Year	Pos	Artist	Label	Record Date	Title	composer(s)
1940	1	Bob Atcher and Bonnie Blue Eyes	Vocalion Single 05370	February 1940	You Are My Sunshine	First #1 record June 1940
1941	7	Bob Atcher and Bonnie Blue Eyes	Okeh single 06395	April 27, 1941	Doesn't Matter Anymore	Lahn
1942	2	Bob Atcher	Okeh single 05134	September 15, 1939	I'm Thinking Tonight Of My Blue Eyes	Alvin Pleasant Carter
1942	3	Bob Atcher	Okeh single 06496	November 11, 1941	Walking the Floor Over You	Ernest Tubb
1942	8	Bob Atcher	Okeh single 06639	January 20, 1942	Don't Let Your Sweet Love Die	Roy Hall
1942	15	Bob Atcher and Bonnie Blue Eyes	Okeh single 06496	November 11, 1941	Sweethearts Or Strangers	Jimmie Davis and Lou Wayne
1942	29	Bob Atcher	Okeh single 06686	May 5, 1942	Sorrow On My Mind	Floyd Jenkins aka Fred Rose
1943	2	Bob Atcher and Bonnie Blue Eyes	Okeh single 06689	May 5, 1942	Pins and Needles (In My Heart)	Floyd Jenkins
1943	15	Bob Atcher	Okeh single 06689	January 20, 1942	Time Alone	Floyd Jenkins
1946	7	Bob Atcher	Columbia single 36983	February 25, 1946	I Must Have Been Wrong	Bob Atcher
1948	6	Bob Atcher	Columbia single 37991	November 3, 1947	Signed, Sealed And Delivered	Cowboy Copas, Lois Mann aka Sydney Nathan
1949	9	Bob Atcher	Columbia single 20611	July 22, 1949	Why Don't You Haul Off And Love Me	Lonnie Glosson, Wayne Raney
1949	12	Bob Atcher	Columbia single 20557	February 6, 1949	Tennessee Border	Jimmy Work
