= Why Don't You Love Me =

Why Don't You Love Me or Why Don't You Love Me? may refer to:

- "Why Don't You Love Me" (Beyoncé song)
- "Why Don't You Love Me" (Hank Williams song)
- "Why Don't You Love Me?", a song by Hot Chelle Rae featuring Demi Lovato from their 2011 album Whatever
- "Why Don't You Love Me", a song by Moon Mullican
- "Why Don't You Love Me?", a song by Tory Lanez from his 2018 album Love Me Now?
- "Why Don't You Love Me", an unreleased song by FKA Twigs and Dua Lipa

== See also ==
- "Why Don't You Haul Off and Love Me", by Wayne Raney
- "Y U Don't Love Me? (Miss Amerikkka)", a song by Joey Badass from his 2017 album All-Amerikkkan Badass
