= G.I. Blues (disambiguation) =

G.I. Blues is a 1960 film.

G.I. Blues may also refer to:

- G.I. Blues (soundtrack), the soundtrack to the film
  - "G.I. Blues" (Elvis Presley song), a song from the soundtrack
- "G.I. Blues" (Floyd Tillman song), 1944
