= Dean "Tex" Martin Rides Again =

Studio album by Dean Martin
- Released: April 22–24, 1963
- Recorded: 1963
- Genre: Country
- Length: 33:22
- Label: Reprise – R9 6085
- Producer: Jimmy Bowen

Dean Martin chronology
Dean "Tex" Martin: Country Style (1963)	Dean "Tex" Martin Rides Again (1963)	Reprise Musical Repertory Theatre (A set of 4 albums, including 3 albums with Dean) (1963)

Dean "Tex" Martin Rides Again is the twelfth studio album by Dean Martin, arranged and conducted by Marty Paich.

This album was a sequel to Martin's previous country music themed album, Dean "Tex" Martin: Country Style.

== Reception ==
Professional ratings
Review scores
Source	Rating
Allmusic	3/5 stars
New Record Mirror	4/5 stars

The Billboard review from 15 June 1963 selected the album for its pop spotlight, and commentated that "...both the devotees of country music and Dino will be pleased". William Ruhlmann on Allmusic.com said that "The songs may have been Nashville products technically, but [Marty] Paich got no closer to real country music than the countrypolitan style...This was country music by way of Hollywood. But that suited Martin, who sounded as at ease as ever. If there was any criticism to be made of his approach, it was that he brought little sense of emotional turmoil to some of the romantic laments here".

== Track listing ==
No.	Title	Writer(s)	Length
1.	"I'm Gonna Change Everything"	Alex Zanetis	2:33
2.	"Candy Kisses"	George Morgan	3:06
3.	"Rockin' Alone (In an Old Rockin' Chair)"	Bob Miller	2:31
4.	"Just a Little Lovin' (Will Go a Long Way)"	Eddy Arnold, Zeke Clements	2:06
5.	"I Can't Help It (If I'm Still in Love with You)"	Hank Williams	2:44
6.	"My Sugar's Gone"	Walter Kent, Harry Warren	3:00
7.	"Corrine, Corrina"	Bo Chatmon, Mitchell Parish, J. Mayo Williams	2:44
8.	"Take Good Care of Her"	Arthur Kent, Edward C. Warren	3:24
9.	"The Middle of the Night Is My Cryin' Time"	Sheb Wooley	2:50
10.	"From Lover to Loser"	W. Kent, Harry Warren	3:08
11.	"Bouquet of Roses"	Bob Hilliard, Steve Nelson	3:00
12.	"Second Hand Rose (Second Hand Heart)"	Harlan Howard	2:16

== Personnel ==
- Dean Martin – vocals
- Marty Paich – arranger, conductor
- Merle Travis – liner notes
