= Billboard year-end top 30 singles of 1949 =

Ranking of recorded music

This is a list of Billboard magazine's top popular songs of 1949 according to retail sales.

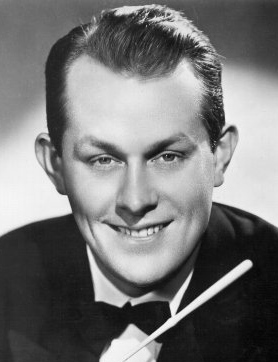
Vaughn Monroe's rendition of "Riders in the Sky" topped the year-end list, while his renditions of "Someday" and "Red Roses for a Blue Lady" also appeared at number 12 and number 21, respectively.

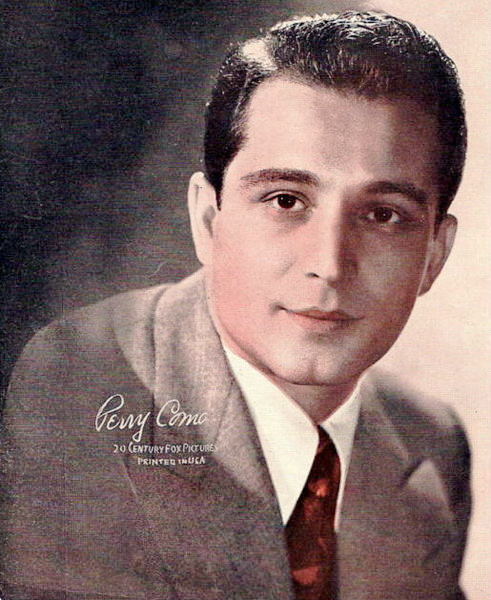
Perry Como has three songs on the year-end list, including the number one singles "Some Enchanted Evening" and "'A' You're Adorable" and the number two single "Forever and Ever".

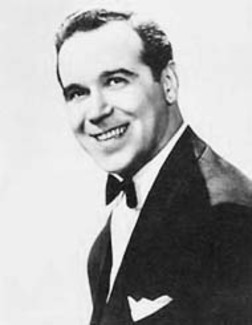
Big band leader Russ Morgan charted three songs on the list, with one ("Cruising Down the River") credited as Russ Morgan Orchestra, while the other two ("Forever and Ever" and "So Tired") were credited under just his name.

== Year-end list ==
No.	Title	Artist(s)
1	"Riders in the Sky"	Vaughn Monroe
2	"That Lucky Old Sun"	Frankie Laine
3	"You're Breaking My Heart"	Vic Damone
4	"Some Enchanted Evening"	Perry Como
5	"Slippin' Around"	Jimmy Wakely and Margaret Whiting
6	"I Can Dream, Can't I?"	The Andrews Sisters and Gordon Jenkins
7	"Cruising Down the River"	Russ Morgan Orchestra
8	"A Little Bird Told Me"	Evelyn Knight and the Stardusters
9	"Mule Train"	Frankie Laine
10	"Jealous Heart"	Al Morgan
11	"Cruising Down the River"	Blue Barron Orchestra
12	"Someday"	Vaughn Monroe
13	"Again"	Doris Day
14	"Forever and Ever"	Russ Morgan
15	"Forever and Ever"	Perry Como with Mitchell Ayres
16	"Don't Cry, Joe"	Gordon Jenkins Orchestra
17	"Room Full of Roses"	Sammy Kaye
18	"Far Away Places"	Bing Crosby and Ken Darby Choir
19	"Buttons and Bows"	Dinah Shore
20	"Galway Bay"	Bing Crosby
21	"Red Roses for a Blue Lady"	Vaughn Monroe
22	"So Tired"	Russ Morgan
23	"Powder Your Face with Sunshine"	Evelyn Knight and the Stardusters
24	"Baby, It's Cold Outside"	Margaret Whiting and Johnny Mercer
25	"Whispering Hope"	Jo Stafford and Gordon MacRae with Paul Weston
26	"Maybe It's Because"	Dick Haymes
27	"Careless Hands"	Sammy Kaye Orchestra
28	"'A' You're Adorable"	Perry Como and The Fontane Sisters
29	"The Hucklebuck"	Tommy Dorsey Orchestra and Charlie Shavers
30	"I Don't See Me in Your Eyes Anymore"	Gordon Jenkins Orchestra and the Stardusters

== See also ==
- 1949 in music
- List of Billboard number-one singles of 1949
