= Each Night at Nine =

Song by Floyd Tillman
- A-side: "G.I. Blues"
- Released: 1944
- Genre: Country
- Label: Columbia
- Songwriter: Floyd Tillman

"Each Night at Nine" is a country song written and performed by Floyd Tillman. It was recorded in April 1944 in New York City and was released on the Decca label (record no. 9–46102) with "G.I. Blues" as the "A" side. In December 1944, it peaked at No. 4 on Billboard's folk chart.

Both "Each Night at Nine" and its "A" side were sentimental wartime ballads that tapped into the loneliness of soldiers serving overseas in during World War II. TThelyrics tell of a soldier who is a thousand miles across the water. He thinks of his sweetheart each night at nine, holding her picture close to his heart. It helps to remind him that she is still his and to feel her nearness each night.

The song was also covered by other artists, including Ernest Tubb, Marty Robbins, Dave Dudley, and Willie Nelson. Tillman's version appeared on multiple compilation albums, including "Floyd Tillman's Greatest" (1958), "Country Music Hall of Fame" (1991), "The Influence" (duet with Willie Nelson), and "Columbia & RCA Sessions (1946-1957)" (2018).
