= We Need a Whole Lot More of Jesus (and a Lot Less Rock and Roll) =

Song by Wayne Raney
- B-side: "Don't You Think It's Time"
- Released: 1959
- Recorded: 1958
- Genre: Christian country
- Length: 2:14
- Label: Poor Boy
- Songwriter: Wayne Raney

"We Need a Whole Lot More of Jesus (and a Lot Less Rock and Roll)" is a Christian country song originally written and recorded by Wayne Raney in 1959.

It later attracted renewed interest during the American folk music revival. The song was popular in the southern gospel thoroughout the 1960's and early 1970's and sung by many gospel and country acts in concert during this period, as well as several cover versions on record, including Cowboy Copas. Skeeter Davis recorded it in 1970 and it was released as a single, peaking at #69 on Billboard's country charts.

Though it was originally intended to be sincere, the song has since been covered ironically and somewhat tongue in cheek by Linda Ronstadt and the Greenbriar Boys, among other artists. Author Peter Lewry described Ronstadt's cover as "...one of the standout tracks" on Hand Sown ... Home Grown, the album on which the cover originally appeared.
