= I Gotta Have My Baby Back =

Song by Floyd Tillman
- Released: 1949
- Genre: Country
- Label: Columbia

"I Gotta Have My Baby Back" is a country song written and performed by Floyd Tillman. It was recorded in October 1949 and was released on the Columbia label (record no. 20641) with "It Had To Be That Way" as the "B" side. In December 1949, it peaked at No. 4 on Billboard's country and western disc jockeys chart.

The song's lyrics tell of longing for a lost sweetheart. He misses her so much it hurts. He is alone in a tavern as people laugh and dance, and the jukebox plays songs that remind him of her and make him blue.

A jazz-influened cover version by Ella Fitzgerald and The Mills Brothers was rated No. 2 by disc jockeys in December 1949. A cover by Red Foley peaked at No. 10 on the folk Juke box chart in January 1950. Other notable cover versions included performances by Les Paul and Mary Ford, Hank Thompson, Jerry Wayne, Tennessee Ernie Ford, Sonny James, a trio of Merle Haggard, Willie Nelson, and Ray Price, Glen Campbell, Ray McKinley, Michael Parks, Justin Tubb, and Cindy Church.

Tillman's version of the song also appeared on multiple compilation albums, including "Floyd Tillman's Greatest" (1958), "The Influence" (2004, duet with Ray Price), and "Columbia & RCA Sessions (1946-1957)" (2018).
