= Dean "Tex" Martin: Country Style =

Studio album by Dean Martin
- Released: January 14, 1963
- Recorded: 1963
- Genre: Country
- Length: 30:08
- Label: Reprise – R9-6061
- Producer: Chuck Sagle

Dean Martin chronology
Dino Latino (1963)	Dean "Tex" Martin: Country Style (1963)	Dean "Tex" Martin Rides Again (1963)

Dean "Tex" Martin: Country Style is the eleventh studio album by Dean Martin, arranged and conducted by Don Costa.

This was Martin's first album of country music, it was followed by Dean "Tex" Martin Rides Again later in 1963. This was the first of two albums that Martin released in 1963. Dean "Tex" Martin: Country Style peaked at 109 on the Billboard 200.

It was reissued on CD by Capitol Records in 2006.

== Reception ==
Professional ratings
Review scores
Source	Rating
Allmusic	3/5 stars

The initial Billboard review from 26 January 1963 selected the album for its pop spotlight, and commentated that "...Dino sings them willingly over fine arrangements by Don Costa...Strong wax here". William Ruhlmann on Allmusic.com gave the album three stars out of five. Ruhlmann wrote that "The arrangements by Don Costa certainly weren't hardcore country, but there were guitars twanging away and Martin simply rolled over the top with his usual ease of delivery. The result was surprisingly pleasurable, and Country Style even spent several weeks in the charts".

== Track listing ==
No.	Title	Writer(s)	Length
1.	"I'm So Lonesome I Could Cry"	Hank Williams	2:38
2.	"Face in a Crowd"	Ramona Redd, Mitchell Torok	2:51
3.	"Things"	Bobby Darin	2:40
4.	"Room Full of Roses"	Tim Spencer	3:01
5.	"I Walk the Line"	Johnny Cash	2:26
6.	"My Heart Cries for You"	Percy Faith, Carl Sigman	3:13
7.	"Anytime"	Herbert "Happy" Lawson	2:22
8.	"Shutters and Boards"	John Turner	2:53
9.	"Blue Blue Day"	Don Gibson	1:49
10.	"Singing the Blues"	Melvin Endsley	2:10
11.	"Hey, Good Lookin'"	Williams	1:46
12.	"Ain't Gonna Try Anymore"	Clint Ballard	2:19

== Personnel ==
- Dean Martin – vocals
- Don Costa – arranger, conductor
- Chuck Sagle – producer
- James Burton – Guitar
