= Steve Nelson (songwriter) =

American songwriter

- Born: Steve Edward Nelson; November 24, 1907; New York City, New York, U.S.
- Died: November 13, 1981 (aged 73) Armonk, New York, U.S.
- Genres: Country
- Occupation: Songwriter

Steve Edward Nelson (November 24, 1907 – November 13, 1981) was an American songwriter.

== Life and career ==
Born in New York City, Nelson was the son of Tin Pan Alley songwriter Ed G. Nelson, and brother to Ed Nelson Sr; with whom he sometimes collaborated. Earning a degree from New York University, Nelson became a member of ASCAP in 1945. He began to write country songs for the music publishing firm Hill & Range in New York City.

In 1948, Nelson collaborated on his first hit, Bouquet of Roses, with lyricist Bob Hillard. The song became a million-selling hit recording for singer Eddy Arnold, and remained No. 1 on the country music charts for 19 weeks.

Nelson collaborated with lyricist Jack Rollins on two popular holiday classics: Here Comes Peter Cottontail (1949) and Frosty the Snowman (1950). Both songs were recorded by Gene Autry in 1950, with Frosty becoming another million-selling single for Nelson. Jimmy Durante recorded Frosty later that same year.

In 1969, the American production company RankinBass produced the stop-motion animated Christmas television special based on the song, Frosty the Snowman. The song was sung by Jimmy Durante. Here Comes Peter Cottontail served as the title song in the 1971 Easter stop-motion television special of the same name produced by Rankin/Bass Productions. It was performed by Danny Kaye, who was the film's narrator.

In 1952, Nelson composed, again with Rollins as lyricist, the song Smokey the Bear; which was used for the safety campaign of Smokey Bear. Nelson and Rollins explained that they added the word "the" to the title in order for the song to work rhythmically. The song was recorded by American country music singer Eddy Arnold.

Nelson is also known for writing the songs A Heart Full of Love (For a Handful of Kisses), I'm Throwing Rice (At The Girl That I Love), and One Kiss Too Many.

Nelson was inducted into the Nashville Songwriters Hall of Fame, along with his brother Ed Nelson Jr, in 1973.
