= Peter Cottontail (song) =

Single

Single by Mervin Shiner
- A-side: "Floppy"
- Written: 1949
- Released: February 1950
- Recorded: 1950
- Genre: Country
- Length: 2:33
- Label: Decca
- Songwriters: Steve Nelson, Jack Rollins

"Here Comes Peter Cottontail" is a popular secular Easter song composed in 1949 by Steve Nelson and Jack Rollins. Nelson and Rollins also wrote "Frosty the Snowman" in 1950. Mervin Shiner was the first person to record the song, on Decca Records in 1950. It reached #8 on Billboard Hot 100. The name "Peter Cottontail" was used by a character in a 1914 Thornton Burgess book, but may not have been previously used to refer to the Easter Bunny.

Due to the immense popularity of Gene Autry's Christmas songs "Here Comes Santa Claus" and "Rudolph the Red Nosed Reindeer", Nelson and Rollins asked Autry to record their song. His 1950 version was on the Columbia label and peaked at number 3 on the U.S Billboard Hot Country Singles chart and at number 5 on the Billboard Hot 100 chart.

Nelson and Rollins also wrote non-Easter lyrics to the tune that later appeared on the 1963 Walt Disney Records Peter Cottontail Plus Other Funny Bunnies and their Friends.

== Chart performance ==
=== Gene Autry ===
Chart (1950)	Peak position
U.S. Billboard Hot Country Singles	3
U.S. Billboard Hot 100	5

=== Jimmy Wakely ===
Chart (1950)	Peak position
U.S. Billboard Hot Country Singles	7
U.S. Billboard Hot 100	26

=== Johnnie Lee Wills ===
Chart (1950)	Peak position
U.S. Billboard Hot Country Singles	7
