= Odell McLeod =

American country-gospel singer, radio entertainer, and songwriter

Mac Odell
- Birth name: Odell McLeod
- Born: May 31, 1916
- Died: January 11, 2003 (aged 86)
- Genres: Country Gospel
- Occupation: Singer-songwriter
- Labels: Mercury Records, King Records, Acuff-Rose Music
- Formerly of: Mac & Slim, Mac And Little Addie, Hank Williams, Roy Acuff

Odell McLeod 1916–2003 (known by his stage name Mac Odell) was an American country-gospel singer, radio entertainer, and songwriter.

== Early life ==
McLeod was born May 31, 1916, in Roanoke, Alabama. He grew up on country music, listening to artists such as the Skillet Lickers, Deford Bailey, and Jimmie Rodgers. About 1939 he married Adeline Myrtle Wood, better known as Addie. She was from Arkansas and six years his junior. In 1940 they were living in Benton Township, Berrien County, Michigan.

== Career ==
McLeod's began his career by working with Slim Bassett. During the 1930s they traveled regularly with McLeod popularizing his own songs by performing them on radio stations throughout the southern United States. The duo landed a regular show in New Orleans in 1935, known as "Mac & Slim." He continued to work with Bassett until he married his wife Addie. He continued his career as a radio entertainer alongside his wife Addie on WJJD in Chicago. "Mac and Little Addie", as they were known, played for the station's Supper Time Frolic show until the start of World War II. During the war, McLeod worked in a factory in Michigan. He continued to write songs during the war and resumed his career at WLAC in Nashville, Tennessee, once the war had ended. He was with the station until 1957, appearing both solo and as Mac and Little Addie.

McLeod was with the Mercury Records label from 1949 until 1952, leaving to join King Records. He wrote numerous songs throughout his career, including "The Battle of Armageddon" which was recorded by Hank Williams. Additional songs included "Thirty Pieces of Silver" made popular by Wilma Lee Cooper, and "From the Manger to the Cross" sung by Hank Williams, both of which became country music standards.

== Later life ==
McLeod moved to Benton Harbor, Michigan, in 1957 where he became the business owner of "Odell Signs." He had given up songwriting at this time before suffering a heart attack in 1974 which led him to give up his business. In the late 1970s, he began writing and performing again, penning new songs as well as re-recording some of his earlier songs for the Folk Variety label of Germany. He traveled to the Netherlands in the 1980s where he and Addie toured with A.G. and Kate, a popular gospel duo. He died on January 11, 2003, at his home in Benton Harbor, Berrien County, Michigan.
