= Mervin Shiner =

American country singer (1921–2023)

- Mervin Shiner in 1950

Background information
- Born: Mervin James Shiner; February 20, 1921; Bethlehem, Pennsylvania, U.S.
- Died: October 23, 2023 (aged 102) Tampa, Florida, U.S.
- Genre: Country
- Occupations: Singer-songwriter, musician
- Instruments: Guitar
- Labels: Decca; Vocalian; Apex; Coral; RCA Victor; Certron

Mervin James Shiner (February 20, 1921 – October 23, 2023) was an American country singer, songwriter, and guitar player, known for his honky-tonk style.

== Biography ==
Mervin James Shiner was born in Bethlehem, Pennsylvania, on February 20, 1921. He gained popularity in Pennsylvania with his mother as a country and gospel duo on a radio program.

In 1942, during World War II, wanting to find musical success in Hollywood as a solo artist, Shiner briefly moved away to Los Angeles, California, only to return shortly after.

Shiner pursued his music career in Hollywood and later returned to the East Coast, where he continued singing on radio shows and joined a local cowboy band. In 1949, he appeared on the television program "Hometown Frolic" and caught the attention of songwriter Vaughn Horton, leading to a recording contract with Decca Records.

Several of his songs, such as "Why Don't You Haul Off and Love Me", which made the top ten on the country and western chart, plus the three million-seller, "Peter Cottontail", achieved success and opened doors for him, allowing him to perform with renowned artists such as Hank Williams and Minnie Pearl.

Shiner appeared briefly in a cameo appearance as himself in his only film appearance in 1950 film Holiday Rhythm. Shiner toured extensively, especially in Nashville, and throughout his career he recorded for various labels, including Decca, Vocalion, Apex, Coral, RCA Victor, and Certron Records.

Shiner died in Tampa, Florida, on October 23, 2023, at the age of 102.

== Discography ==
=== Singles ===
- "Why Don't You Haul Off and Love Me"
- "Peter Cottontail"
- "I Won't Go Huntin' Jake, But I'll Go Chasin' Women"

=== Albums ===
- "In The Ghetto"
- "Life Is Lovin' What You're Made For"
- "Greatest Christmas Kiddie Hits" (a compilation of popular Christmas songs, covered by Shiner)
