= A Home in Heaven =

Single by Hank Williams & Audrey Williams
- B-side: "The Pale Horse and His Rider"
- Released: 1956
- Recorded: March 23, 1951
- Studio: Castle Studio, Nashville
- Genre: Country, gospel
- Length: 2:32
- Label: MGM
- Songwriter: Hank Williams
- Producer: Fred Rose

"A Home in Heaven" is a hymn written by Hank Williams and recorded as a duet with his wife Audrey Williams. It was released as a single on MGM Records in 1956.

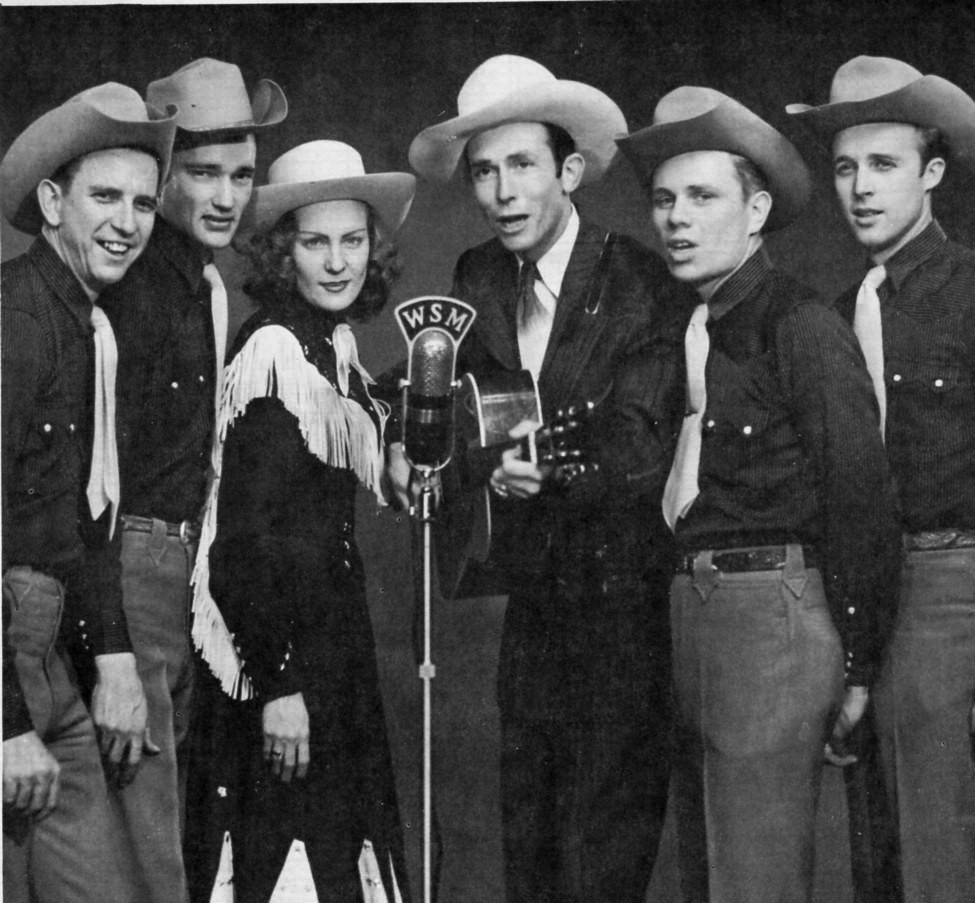
Audrey Williams, Hank Williams, and the Drifting Cowboys band

== Background ==
By all accounts, Audrey Williams had no sense of time as a singer, but she nonetheless sang with her husband at his personal appearances and on his Mother's Best Flour radio shows. Early Williams band member R.D. Norred later recalled, "Audrey couldn't carry a tune in a bucket, and the more she practiced, the worse she got." Williams was painfully aware of his wife's limitations as a vocalist but indulged her ambitions anyway, allowing her to sing and arranging recording sessions for her. Louisiana Hayride producer Horace Logan told Williams biographer Colin Escott that he would have never allowed her onstage but claimed Hank told him, "Logan, I've got to let her sing. I've got to live with the woman." Hank had gotten Audrey a deal with Decca but, after quickly recognizing her lack of singing talent, the label dropped her, and in March 1951 he persuaded his producer Fred Rose to cut them singing some duets of spiritual material.

== Recording and composition ==
"A Home in Heaven" was a song that Williams had kicked around in one guise or another for five years; a version had been included on a set of demos sent to Columbia in 1946 and it resurfaced again later under the title "Are You Building a Temple in Heaven?" Hank and Audrey were backed on the session by Jerry Rivers (fiddle), Don Helms (steel guitar), Sammy Pruett (electric guitar), Jack Shook (rhythm guitar), and Howard Watts or Ernie Newton (bass). Largely due to Audrey's tuneless singing, Rose refused to release it, but MGM - desperate for new material after Hank's death in 1953 - released the song in 1956 with another duet, "The Pale Horse and His Rider," as the B-side. Colin Escott observes, "Once again, Hank and Audrey's domestic disharmony seemed to find its extension on disc as she tried for supremacy on every note."
