= Floyd Tillman =

American singer-songwriter

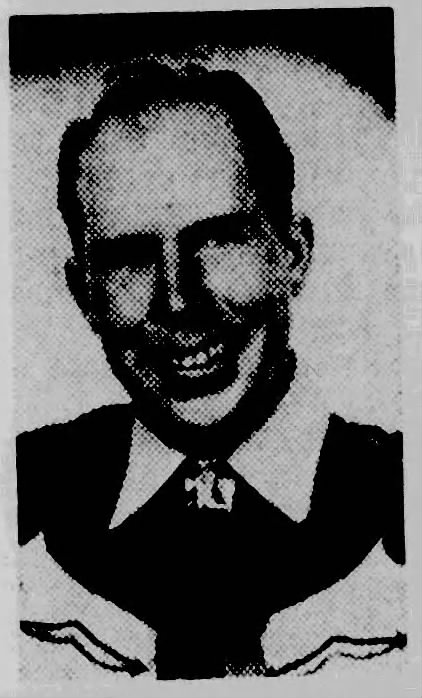
- Tillman c. 1949

Background information
- Born: December 8, 1914; Ryan, Oklahoma, U.S.
- Origin: San Antonio, Texas, U.S.
- Died: August 22, 2003 (aged 88) Bacliff, Texas, U.S.
- Genres: Country music, western swing, honky tonk
- Occupations: Musician, songwriter
- Instrument: Guitar
- Years active: 1938–2003
- Labels: Decca, Musicor, RCA Victor, Columbia, Heart of Texas

Floyd Tillman (December 8, 1914 – August 22, 2003) was an American country musician who, in the 1930s and 1940s, helped create the Western swing and honky tonk genres. Tillman was inducted into the Nashville Songwriters Hall of Fame in 1970 and the Country Music Hall of Fame in 1984.

== Biography ==
=== Early life ===
He was born in Ryan, Oklahoma, United States, and grew up in the cotton-mill town of Post, Texas as a sharecropper's son. One of his early jobs was with Western Union as a telegraph operator. In the early 1930s, Tilman played mandolin and banjo at local dances and eventually took up the guitar.

=== Musical career ===
Tillman moved to San Antonio played lead guitar with Adolph Hofner, a Western swing bandleader, and soon developed into a songwriter and singer. He took a job with Houston pop bandleader Mack Clark in 1938, and played with Western swing groups fronted by Leon "Pappy" Selph and Cliff Bruner. He also worked with Ted Daffan, and singer and piano player Moon Mullican.

Tillman recorded as a featured vocalist with Selph's Blue Ridge Playboys in 1938, the same year Floyd scored his first major songwriting hit, "It Makes No Difference Now", giving him his own Decca recording contract. Jimmie Davis purchased the song from Floyd for $300, the co-rights to which he got back 28 years later.

Tillman's only No. 1 one song as a singer was "They Took the Stars Out of Heaven". It reached the top of the charts in 1944. Previously, he had reached No. 2 with "I'm Gonna Change All My Ways". His 1944 hit, "Each Night At Nine", struck a chord with lonely servicemen during World War II. Axis Sally and Tokyo Rose played it heavily to encourage desertion.

A big hit for Tillman and also for Jimmy Wakely was 1948's "I Love You So Much It Hurts". His 1949 "Slippin' Around", one of the first country western "cheating" songs, was a hit for Tillman as well as Ernest Tubb, Texas Jim Robertson and the duo of Margaret Whiting and Jimmy Wakely. Tillman had another successful song with his own answer, "I'll Never Slip Around Again", as again did the Whiting-Wakely duo. He slowed down on his performing in the early 1950s, although he appeared on ABC-TV's Jubilee USA in 1958 and 1959.

Tillman's final album, recorded in 2002 and 2003 titled The Influence, paired him with country music artists who were influenced by his style and performing: Willie Nelson, Merle Haggard, Leona Williams, Dolly Parton, Justin Trevino, Ray Price, Frankie Miller, Hank Thompson, Connie Smith, Lawton Williams, Mel Tillis, Darrell McCall, Johnny Bush and George Jones. The project, released in April 2004, featured liner notes by Dr. Bill Malone, Bill Mack, Hank Thompson and Willie Nelson. It was produced by Justin Trevino on Heart of Texas Records.

He was inducted into the Nashville Songwriters Hall of Fame in 1970, and the Country Music Hall of Fame in 1984.

Floyd Tillman died in August 2003, at the age of 88.

== Singles ==
Year	Single	US Country
1944	"They Took the Stars Out of Heaven"	1
1944	"G.I. Blues"	5
1944	"Each Night at Nine"	4
1946	"Drivin' Nails in My Coffin"	2
1948	"I Love You So Much It Hurts"	5
1949	"Please Don't Pass Me By"	14
1949	"Slippin' Around"	5
1949	"I'll Never Slip Around Again"	6
1949	"I Gotta Have My Baby Back"	4
1960	"It Just Tears Me Up"	29

== Selected works ==
Title	Master no	Artists	Recorded	Original issue
"A Precious Memory"	65158	Floyd Tillman	6 March 1939, Houston	Decca 5696
"Why Do I Love You"		Floyd Tillman	6 March 1939, Houston	Decca 5696
"I'm Always Dreaming of You"	66327	Floyd Tillman	29 August 1939, Houston	Decca 5801
"Don't Be Blue"	66328	Floyd Tillman	6 March 1939, Houston	Decca 5741
"Maybe I'll Get By Without You"	66330	Floyd Tillman	6 March 1939, Houston	Decca 5801
"I Love You So Much It Hurts"		Vic Damone, Floyd Tillman and Connie Smith, Red Foley, Ernest Tubb, Jerry Lee Lewis, Ray Charles, Ray Price, Mickey Gilley, Andy Williams, Marie Osmond, Eddy Arnold, Floyd Tillman, Jimmy Wakely, John Prine, Patsy Cline		RCA Victor 20-7157 A-side
"Slipping Around"		Margaret Whiting and Jimmy Wakely, Ernest Tubb, Floyd Tillman, Texas Jim Robertson, Marion Worth and George Morgan, Roy Drusky and Priscilla Mitchell, Jerry Lee Lewis, Mack Abernathy, Floyd Tillman and Dolly Parton, Ray Anthony		RCA Victor 20-7157 B-side
"I Gotta Have My Baby Back"		Floyd Tillman, Red Foley, Ella Fitzgerald, Justin Tubb, Ray Price, Floyd Tillman and Ray Price, Rex Allen, Tennessee Ernie Ford, Les Paul and Mary Ford, Hank Thompson, Glen Campbell	October 1949, Houston	Columbia 20641
"I Am Music (Song of Music)"		Skeets McDonald		
"It Makes No Difference Now"; Co-writer: Jimmie Davis		Eddy Arnold, Cliff Bruner, Bing Crosby, The Supremes, Gene Autry, Ray Charles, Jimmie Davis, Willie Nelson, Hank Snow, Ray Pennington, Buddy Emmons, Hank Thompson, Merle Haggard, Jerry Lee Lewis, Burl Ives		Musicor 1355 A-side
"The Stars Fell Out Of Heaven"	93739	Floyd Tillman	30 April 1941, Dallas	Decca 6090
"This Cold War With You"		Floyd Tillman	Ray Price, Merle Haggard, Willie Nelson and Ray Price, Rex Allen, Columbia 20615	
"Why Do You Treat Me This Way?"		Floyd Tillman	30 April 1941, Dallas	Decca 6090
"Each Night at Nine"		Floyd Tillman	20 April 1944, New York City	Decca 6104
"G.I. Blues"		Floyd Tillman		
"Some Other World"		Floyd Tillman		Columbia 20026
"Daisy May"		Ernest Tubb, Floyd Tillman	11 April 1940, Houston	Decca 5845
"Please Don't Pass Me By"		Floyd Tillman		
"I'll Never Slip Around Again"		Floyd Tillman, Margaret Whiting and Jimmy Wakely, Doris Day		Columbia 20615

== Bibliography ==
- Vladimir Bogdanov, Chris Woodstra & Stephen Thomas Erlewine (ed.) (2003) All Music Guide to Country, 2nd ed., p. 750, ISBN 0-87930-760-9 .
- Richard Carlin (1995) The Big Book of Country Music, A Biographical Encyclopedia, p. 458, ISBN 0-14-023509-4 .
- The Editors of Country Music (magazine) (1994) The Comprehensive Country Music Encyclopedia, p. 387, ISBN 0-8129-2247-6 .
- Barry McCloud (1995) Definitive Country: The Ultimate Encyclopedia of Country Music and Its Performers, p. 810-1, ISBN 0-399-52144-5 .
- Kurt Wolff (2000) Country Music: The Rough Guide, p. 149-50, ISBN 1-85828-534-8 .
