= Joseph M. Palmaccio =

American audio engineer (1965–2021)

Joseph M. Palmaccio (1965 – October 16, 2021), also credited as Joe Palmaccio, was an American mastering engineer born in rural South Carolina.

Palmaccio was nominated for six Grammy Awards and won four in the Best Historical Album category for mastering. Those projects are:

- 1998: "The Complete Hank Williams" Hank Williams
- 2003: "Martin Scorsese Presents the Blues--A Musical Journey" various artists
- 2004: "Night Train to Nashville--Music City Rhythm & Blues, 1945-1970" various artists
- 2014 "The Complete Sussex and Columbia Albums" Bill Withers

Palmaccio began his formal musical training at age eight after moving to a small town outside Chicago. First as a trumpet player and later as a drummer, his love of music led him to record his first demo at Hedden West Studios as a teenager.

After completing a B.A. from Indiana University in Telecommunications with a minor in Religious Studies, he went on to work as a mastering engineer for Bonneville Broadcasting (1988–1990), PolyGram Records (1990–1995), Sterling Sound (1995–1998), and Sony Music Studios (1999–2006).

He founded The Place...For Mastering in Nashville, TN, where he was president and chief engineer.

Palmaccio died on October 16, 2021, while recovering from a motorcycle accident.
