= The Pale Horse and His Rider =

Single by Hank Williams & Audrey Williams
- A-side: "A Home in Heaven"
- Released: 1956
- Recorded: 23 March 1951
- Studio: Castle Studio, Nashville
- Genre: Country, Gospel
- Length: 2:55
- Label: MGM
- Songwriter(s): Ervin Staggs, Johnnie Bailes, Z. Clements, M.D. Wright
- Producer(s): Fred Rose

"The Pale Horse and His Rider" is a hymn written by Ervin Staggs, Johnnie Bailes, Zeke Clements, and M.D. Wright. It was recorded in 1951 as a duet by Hank Williams and his wife Audrey Williams and released as a single by MGM Records in 1956 as the B-side to "A Home in Heaven." It is likely that Williams learned the song from his co-writer Johnny Bailes when he worked with the Bailes Brothers in Shreveport in 1948 and 1949, but the song dated back to 1939 when Bailes was working with Molly O'Day and Ervin Staggs at WCHS in Charleston, West Virginia. Hank and Audrey were backed on the session by Jerry Rivers (fiddle), Don Helms (steel guitar), Sammy Pruett (electric guitar), Jack Shook (rhythm guitar), and Howard Watts or Ernie Newton (bass).
