= G.I. Blues (Floyd Tillman song) =

Song by Floyd Tillman and His Favorite Playboys
- B-side: "Each Night at Nine"
- Released: 1944
- Genre: Country
- Label: Columbia
- Songwriter: Floyd Tillman

"G.I. Blues" is a country song written and performed by Floyd Tillman. It was recorded in April 1944 in New York City and was released on the Decca label with "Each Night at Nine" as the "B" side. In December 1944, it peaked at No. 5 on Billboard's folk chart.

Both "G.I. Blues" and its "B" side "Each Night at Nine" were sentimental wartime ballads that tapped into the loneliness of soldiers serving overseas in during World War II. The lyrics of "G.I. Blues" tell of a soldier serving overseas, wearing shorts, sitting around, and complaining that there are a thousand guys and a dozen gals, "most of them too darn fat." He thinks about what he would give for a pass to get next to a pretty lass. He's got the G.I. blues.
