= I'll Never Slip Around Again =

1949 song by Floyd Tillman

Single by Floyd Tillman
- Released: 1949
- Genre: Country
- Label: Columbia
- Songwriter: Floyd Tillman

"I'll Never Slip Around Again" is a country music song written and performed by Floyd Tillman and released in 1949. It was a follow-up song to Tillman's "Slippin' Around" that was released earlier in 1949. The follow-up song was released in October 1949 and reached No. 6 on the Billboard folk best sellers chart in October 1949. A cover version by Margaret Whiting and Jimmy Wakely peaked at No. 2 on the folk best sellers and juke box lists in November 1949.

The song used essentially the same melody as "Slippin' Around". The lyrics tell a follow-up story in which the cheating couple from the original song has married and is in turn worried that they are being cheated on.

Other cover versions of the song included:

- Doris Day and Her Country Cousins, Columbia No. 38637, RHCO 3924
- Hank Garland (1949, Decca)
- Rex Turner (1949)
- Tex Morton with "Sister" Dorrie and his Roughriders (1950)
- The Honeydrippers
