= A Heart Full of Love (For a Handful of Kisses) =

1948 song by Eddy Arnold, Steve Nelson and Ray Soehnel

"A Heart Full of Love For a Handful of Kisses"

Single by Eddy Arnold, The Tennessee Plowboy and His Guitar
- B-side: Then I Turned And Walked Slowly Away
- Published: June 22, 1948 by Hill and Range Songs, Inc., Hollywood, Calif.
- Released: October 28, 1948
- Recorded: December 17, 1947
- Studio: RCA Victor Studio 1, 155 East 24th St., New York City
- Genre: Country
- Length: 2:33
- Label: RCA Victor 20-3174
- Songwriter(s): Eddy Arnold, Steve Nelson and Ray Soehnel

Eddy Arnold, The Tennessee Plowboy and His Guitar singles chronology
"Just a Little Lovin' Will Go a Long Way" (1949)	"A Heart Full of Love For a Handful of Kisses" (1948)	"Don't Rob Another Man's Castle" (1949)

"A Heart Full of Love (For a Handful of Kisses)" is a 1948 single by Eddy Arnold.

Written by Arnold, Steve Nelson and Ray Soehnel, the song was Arnold's eighth number one, where it spent one week at the top of the Best Seller lists. The b-side of "A Heart Full of Love (For a Handful of Kisses)", is a song titled, "Then I Turned and Slowly Walked Away" hit number four on the Folk Best Seller lists.
