= Let's Say Goodbye Like We Said Hello (song) =

Single by Ernest Tubb
- Released: 1945
- Genre: Country
- Label: Decca
- Songwriters: Ernest Tubb, Jimmie Skinner

"Let's Say Goodbye Like We Said Hello" is a country music song written by Ernest Tubb and Jimmie Skinner and performed by Tubb. It was released in 1945 on the Decca label (catalog no. 46144B) with "Have You Ever Been Lonely" as the "A" side. It peaked in 1945 at No. 5 on the Billboard country and western chart and remained on the chart for 17 weeks.

The song's lyrics suggest that he and his sweetheart say goodbye like they said hello, in a friendly kind of way. She was all the happiness he knew, and he wishes her happiness and good luck and that every dream come true.

The song was also recorded by Wanda Jackson, Jimmie Skinner and Lee Moore. Tubb's version was later included on multiple compilation albums, including "The Ernest Tubb Story" (1959) "Let's Say Goodbye Like We Said Hello" (1991), and "The Texas Troubadour" (2003).
