= I'm Satisfied with You =

Hank Williams song

Single by Hank Williams
- B-side: "I Ain't Got Nothin' but Time"
- Released: 1954
- Recorded: August 4, 1947, Castle Studio, Nashville
- Genre: Country
- Length: 2:35
- Label: MGM Records
- Songwriter(s): Fred Rose
- Producer(s): Fred Rose

Hank Williams singles chronology
"How Can You Refuse Him Now" (1954)	"I'm Satisfied with You" (1954)	"(I'm Gonna) Sing, Sing, Sing" (1954)

"I'm Satisfied with You" is a song by Hank Williams. It was written by Fred Rose and recorded in 1947. In 1954, it was posthumously released as a single via MGM Records.

== Background ==
In June 1947, the American Federation of Musicians announced a ban on music recording, set to begin in the new year. When Williams and Rose and heard about the ban, they organized a recording session on August 4, with the goal of recording as many songs as possible so Rose would have songs to release during the ban. In that session, Williams recorded "I'm Satisfied With You" along with three other songs.

In Paul R. Nail 's comprehensive biography of Williams, he wrote that "there is a lack of consensus among researchers" as to the exact lineup of backing musicians used in the recording session (e.g. Susan Masino says Williams was accompanied by Jerry Byrd on steel guitar, but Mark Ribowsky says the steel guitarist was Herman Herron). However, according to James Ausburn, the lineup was probably the same as Rose had used for the previous recording session: Tommy Jackson, Smokey Lohman, Zeke Turner, Louis Innis, and Brownie Reynolds

== Reception ==
Billboard gave the single and its B-side a negative review, saying of both tracks "The sound is not too good [...] Hank's fans will want it, altho [sic] it is certainly not up to his best."
