= The Echo of Your Footsteps =

1948 song by Jenny Lou Carson

Single by Eddy Arnold, The Tennessee Plowboy and His Guitar
- B-side: One Kiss Too Many
- Published: May 24, 1949 by Hill and Range Songs, Inc., Beverly Hills, Calif.
- Released: April 22, 1949
- Recorded: December 20, 1948
- Studio: RCA Victor 24th Street, New York City
- Genre: Country
- Length: 2:42
- Label: RCA Victor 48-0083
- Songwriter: Jenny Lou Carson

Eddy Arnold, The Tennessee Plowboy and His Guitar singles chronology
"Don't Rob Another Man's Castle" (1949)	"The Echo of Your Footsteps" (1949)	"The Cattle Call" (1949)

"The Echo of Your Footsteps" is a country music song written by Jenny Lou Carson and sung by Eddy Arnold, billed as "Eddy Arnold, The Tennessee Plowboy and His Guitar". It was released in 1949 on the RCA Victor label (catalog no. 21-0051-A). The "B" side was "One Kiss Too Many".

It debuted on Billboard magazine's folk chart on May 21, 1949, peaked at No. 2 on the best seller chart (No. 3 juke box), and remained on the charts for 19 weeks. On Billboard's year-end folk chart, it ranked No. 11 among the best selling record of 1949.

== See also ==
- Billboard Top Folk Records of 1949
