= Tennessee Saturday Night =

Single by Red Foley and the Cumberland Valley Boys
- A-side: "Blues in My Heart"
- Released: August 1948
- Recorded: August 12, 1947
- Genre: Western swing, country boogie
- Length: 2:41
- Label: Decca
- Songwriter: Billy Hughes

Red Foley and the Cumberland Valley Boys singles chronology
"Never Trust a Woman" (1947)	"Tennessee Saturday Night" (1948)	"Candy Kisses" (1949)

"Tennessee Saturday Night" is a Western swing ballad written by Billy Hughes.

== Background ==
The song tells of Tennesseans having a good time on a Saturday night. Each verse ends with the refrain:

They all go native on a Saturday night.

== Red Foley recording ==
Red Foley and the Cumberland Valley Boys had a hit with the song (Decca 45136), staying on the charts for 11 weeks; reaching number on March 19, 1949. Johnny Bond's recording (Columbia 20545) reached number 11 later that year.

== Other artists' recordings ==
- The Pied Pipers (RCA 20-3360)
- Ella Mae Morse (Capitol 1903)
- Pat Boone released a version in 1954, and was the b-side for his version of Ain't That a Shame.
- Roy Clark's (Churchill 94007) reached number 85 in 1982
- Ernest Tubb (1961)
- Jerry Lee Lewis (1967).
- Gene Summers released a rockabilly version of the song on his 1981 French LP Gene Summers In Nashville and performed the song on national French television that same year. The song has been recorded numerous times.
