= I Love You So Much It Hurts =

1948 single by Floyd Tillman

Single by Floyd Tillman
- B-side: "I'll Take What I Can Get"
- Released: c. July 1948
- Genre: Country
- Label: Columbia
- Songwriter: Floyd Tillman

Floyd Tillman singles chronology
"Drivin' Nails in My Coffin" (1946)	"I Love You So Much It Hurts" (1948)	"Please Don't Pass Me By" (1949)

"I Love You So Much It Hurts" is a country music song that was written and performed by Floyd Tillman. It was released in 1948 on the Columbia label (catalog no. 20430) with "I'll Get What I Can Get" on the "B" side. It rose to No. 5 on the Billboard folk juke box chart and No. 6 on the folk best seller chart. It spent a total of 19 weeks on the charts.

The song's lyrics describes the singer's devotion to his lover. He loves her so much it hurts him. He's afraid to go to bed at night, afraid of losing her. He wants to hold her forever.

Tillman's recording of the song appeared on multiple compilation albums, including "Floyd Tillman's Greatest" (1958), "Columbia Country Classics, Vol. 2: Honky Tonk Heroes" (1984), "Columbia Historic Edition: Floyd Tillman" (1985), "Uncle Art Satherly: American Originals" (1991), "The Best of Floyd Tillman" (1999), "The Influence" (2004), "Columbia & RCA Sessions (1946-1957)" (2018), "I Love You So Much It Hurts: His Recordings 1936-1962 & 1981" (2004 Bear Family), and "Columbia & RCA Sessions (1946-1957)" (2018).

== Cover versions ==
The song has become a country music standard that has been covered by numerous artists. Notable cover versions include:

- In 1948, Jimmy Wakely had his second No. 1 hit on the Billboard folk best seller chart with his version of the song. Wakely's version spent a total of twenty-eight weeks on the chart and four non-consecutive weeks at the top.
- In 1949, the Mills Brothers recorded a version of the song that reached No. 8 on both the race records and pop charts.
- Cowboy Copas in 1949, on King Records single No. 767-B
- Charlie Gracie in 1957
- Ray Price in 1958, on his album Talk to Your Heart
- Patsy Ann Noble in 1960
- Bob Luman in 1960, on the album Let's Think About Livin'
- Tennessee Ernie Ford in 1961, on the album Tennessee Ernie Ford Looks At Love
- Patsy Cline in 1961, on the album Patsy Cline Showcase
- Ernest Tubb in 1961, on the album All Time Hits
- Ray Charles in 1962, on the album Modern Sounds in Country and Western Music
- George Morgan/Marion Worth in 1964, on the album Slippin' Around
- Kid Thomas Valentine in 1968 on his album At Kohlman's Tavern
- Don Gibson in 1968 for his album I Love You So Much It Hurts.
- David Houston in 1968, on hs album Already It's Heaven
- Andy Williams in 1974 on his album, You Lay So Easy on My Mind
- R. Stevie Moore in 1986 on his album, Glad Music
- Shelby Lynne in 1989 on her album, Sunrise
- John Prine in 1995, on the album Lost Dogs and Mixed Blessings
- Merle Haggard in 2002, on the album The Peer Sessions
