= Room Full of Roses =

Single by Mickey Gilley

from the album Room Full of Roses
- B-side: "She Called Me Baby"
- Released: April 1974
- Recorded: 1973
- Genre: Country
- Length: 2:50
- Label: Astro; 10003 Playboy; 50056
- Songwriter(s): Tim Spencer
- Producer(s): Mickey Gilley

Mickey Gilley singles chronology
"Now I Can Live Again" (1968)	"Room Full of Roses" (1974)	"I Overlooked an Orchid" (1974)

"Room Full of Roses", written by Tim Spencer, is a song first recorded in 1949 by country music singer George Morgan. The original George Morgan version was released in the summer of 1949, and reached No. 4 on the Billboard country chart that August. A Sons of the Pioneers version reached #10 on the country charts in the same year. It was famously covered in 1974 by up-and-coming singer Mickey Gilley. The Gilley version was his first major hit and broke open his career.

== Background ==
In 1973, Mickey Gilley was enjoying brisk business with his nightclub, Gilley's Club, when he cut four sides for his own label, Astro Records. Those songs included "She Called Me Baby" (for a local jukebox owner), "Abilene" and "When Two Worlds Collide." The fourth was "Room Full of Roses," a song written by Sons of the Pioneers member Tim Spencer that had been recorded by George Morgan. The song had already become somewhat of a country crooner standard, after it had been recorded by Jim Reeves for his 1960 album The Intimate Jim Reeves and by Dean Martin for his 1963 album Dean "Tex" Martin: Country Style.

Gilley never intended to have a hit with "Room Full of Roses," as it was designated the B-side for "She Called Me Baby." In fact, Gilley was not even happy with the final product of that recording. "I liked 'She Called Me Baby,' and thought to myself, well, I finally got something." Gilley once told Country Music magazine. "Then I flipped the record over. All I could hear was that damn steel guitar. The echo was just bounding off the walls.'"

Country music writer Tom Roland also noted that Gilley got lost during the piano interlude during the middle portion of the song, but "somehow managed to come out of it in sync with the studio band." Other flaws pointed out included muffled lyrics and excessive "echo" (to conceal the song being recorded out of tune).

Gilley was resigned, however, to the song being "terrible," as he saw the record being distributed only in the Houston, Texas, area. However, the song quickly became popular and was later picked up for national distribution by the newly formed Playboy Records.

Released in April 1974, the song was Gilley's first of seventeen No. 1 hits on the Billboard magazine Hot Country Singles chart.

== Chart performance ==
Release date	Artist	Chart Positions				
Release date	Artist	^{U.S. C&W}	^{U.S.}	^{CAN C&W}	^{CAN}	^{AUS}
1949	George Morgan	4	25	—	—	—
1949	Dick Haymes	—	6	—	—	—
1949	Don Cornell & Sammy Kaye	—	2	—	—	—
1949	The Sons of the Pioneers	10	26	—	—	—
1974	Mickey Gilley	1	50	6	57	9
