= Lonnie Glosson =

Lonnie Elonzo Glosson
- Born: Lonnie Marvin Glosson; February 14, 1908; Judsonia, Arkansas, United States
- Died: March 2, 2001 (aged 93) Searcy, Arkansas, United States
- Genres: Blues; gospel
- Instruments: harmonica, guitar
- Labels: Decca; Memory; Rimrock; Old Homestead; Victor; Not On Label

Lonnie Elonzo Glosson (born Lonnie Marvin Glosson February 14, 1908 – March 2, 2001) was an American country musician, songwriter, and radio personality who was responsible for popularizing the harmonica on a national level. Glosson is known for his versatility as a live performer, both as a soloist and a group member, and for a radio career spanning nearly seven decades.

== Biography ==
Glosson was born the seventh child of George and Cora Glosson in Judsonia, Arkansas. He changed his middle name to Elonzo because he disliked his uncle he was named after. Originally working as a cotton picker, Glosson was taught the rudiments of the harmonica by his mother before beginning his professional musical career in 1925, on KMOX Radio, in St. Louis. Glosson traveled around the Midwest for performances in small-time venues before auditioning as a cast member for WLS Chicago's National Barn Dance in 1930, alongside many other musical acts, including Gene Autry, who attempted to persuade Glosson to pursue an acting career with him, in Hollywood. Instead, Glosson remained in Chicago to join the WJJD Suppertime Frolic programming. He managed to become a popular local attraction for his ability to include unusually harmonic riffs and sounds in his stage act.

Glosson did eventually go to Hollywood to accept an opening as a radio host in 1934, but returned to the Midwest by the end of the year. In 1936, while being a featured performer on Renfro Valley Barn Dance, Glosson recorded his self-penned song "Arkansas Hard Luck Blues", which was highlighted by an early example of talking blues, a style later popularized by Bob Dylan. Also in the year, Glosson began a long-standing partnership with fellow musician Wayne Raney, fueled by Raney's admiration for Glosson's harmonica techniques, and establishing the team on a radio station in Little Rock. In the early 1940s, Glosson composed for Molly O'Day, whom he first encountered while on Suppertime Frolic, writing songs that included "Mathew 24" and "Don't Forget the Family Prayer". In 1948, Glosson and Raney commenced their most prolific work on a nationally syndicated program centered in Cincinnati. As hosts, the duo promoted WM Kratt Company harmonicas, along with various techniques and instructions. They are credited with being responsible for five million purchases, and effectively bringing the instrument to the mainstream market. In addition, the two recorded with the Delmore Brothers and were credited on the hit song "Blues Stay Away from Me" in 1949.

In 1960, Glosson and Raney's partnership ended when Raney decided to establish a recording studio for emerging rock and roll artists. Glosson initiated a solo career, mainly performing in universities and expanding into gospel music. In the 1970s, Glosson recorded on Raney's Rimrock label, and, in 1980, the duo reunited to record an album.

On March 2, 2001, at the age of 93 Glosson died of natural causes.

== Discography ==
Albums

- The Blue Harp Man (Not On Label HLP-266)
- Live At Tres Rios - Glen Rose Texas (Not On Label [Lonnie Glosson self-released], 1976)
- All Harmonica (Rimrock Records, late 1979s) (Old Homestead Records, 1982)
- Lonnie Glosson The Living Legend (Rimrock Records HLP-104, 40131, 40132, 1979)
- The Living Legends (with Wayne Raney) (Memory Records MLP-002, 1990)

Singles

- Don't Forget the Family Prayer (with Molly O’Day and The Cumberland Folks) (Columbia CO38769, 1947)
- Matthew Twenty-four (with Molly O’Day and The Cumberland Mountain Folks) (Columbia CO38759, 1947)
- Rockin' Chair Miney (with Riders of the Rio Grande and Johnny Tyler) (Victor D7VB-0445, 1947)
- Why Don’t You Haul Off and Love Me (with '49ers Jesse Rogers and Jesse Rogers) (Victor D9AB-2142, 1949)
- Why Don’t You Haul Off and Love Me (with Bob Atcher) (Columbia CCO5065, 1949)
- Down At the Burying Ground (Decca NA2020, 1949)
- I’ve Got the Jitters Over You (Decca NA2021, 1949)
- I Want You to Know That I Love You (Decca NA2022, 1949)
- (I'll Love You) Till the Cows Come Home (Decca NA2023, 1949)
- Trouble Ain’t Nothin' But the .. (Decca CIN5007, 1950)
- Pan American Boogie (Decca CIN5008, 1950)
- Steel Guitar Rag (Decca CIN5009, 1950)
- Del Rio Blues (Decca CIN5010, 1950)
