= Slippin' Around =

1949 song by Floyd Tillman

Single by Floyd Tillman
- Released: 1949
- Genre: Country
- Label: Columbia
- Songwriter: Floyd Tillman

"Slippin' Around" is a country music song written by Floyd Tillman. Tillman's original recording was released in 1949 and reached No. 5 on the Billboard folk best sellers chart. Two cover versions of the song, one by Ernest Tubb and the other by Margaret Whiting and Jimmy Wakely, reached No. 1 on the folk best sellers or juke box charts. The Whiting-Wakey version spent 17 weeks at No. 1. The song became a country music standard that was recorded by numerous artists.

== Tillman's composition and recordings ==
Tillman's original version of the song was released in 1949 on the Columbia label. It peaked at No. 5 on the Billboard country best sllers chart and No. 6 on both the disc jockey and jukebox charts.

Tillman's lyrics tell of a secret love in which th singer always had to "slip around" to be with his lover, in constant fear that they would be discovered. Both of them were committed to others, but he was so in love with her that he hoped someday to find a way to be with her without having to slip around.

Tillman also wrote a follow-up song, also released in 1949, "I'll Never Slip Around Again".

== Whiting-Wakely version ==
"Slippin' Around"

Single by Margaret Whiting, Jimmy Wakely
- Released: 1949
- Genre: Country
- Label: Capitol
- Songwriter: Floyd Tillman

A cover version of Slippin' Around was recorded in 1949 by Margaret Whiting and Jimmy Wakely. It was released on Capitol Records and spent 28 weeks on the Billboard folk best sellers chart, including 17 weeks as the chart's No. 1 record. The Whiting-Wakely also ranked No. 4 at year end on the Billboard Top Folk Records of 1949.

== Ernest Tubb version ==
"Slippin' Around"

Single by Ernest Tubb
- Released: 1949
- Genre: Country
- Label: Decca
- Songwriter: Floyd Tillman

Another cover version by Ernest Tubb was released on the Decca label in 1949. It reached No. 1 on the folk juke box chart, No. 4 on the folk best sellers chart, and spent 20 weeks on the chart.

== Other cover versions ==
The song has been covered by numerous other artists. A cover version by Texas Jim Robertson reached No. 13 on the folk best sellers chart in 1950. A later cover version by George Morgan and Marion Worth reached No. 23 on the Billboard country chart in 1964. Other notable cover versions include:

- Doris Day
- Dave Dudley
- Jerry Lee Lewis
- Benny Martin
- Sammy Masters
- Ray Price
- Kai Winding
- Perry Como (as "Bumming Around")
- Betty Johnson
- Joe South
- Mack Abernathy (1988)

Preceded by "Why Don't You Haul Off and Love Me" by Wayne Raney	Best Selling Retail Folk (Country & Western) Records number one single by Margaret Whiting and Jimmy Wakely; October 8, 1949 - January 14, 1950 (17 weeks)	Succeeded by "Chattanoogie Shoe Shine Boy" by Red Foley
