= Don't Rob Another Man's Castle =

1949 song by Jenny Lou Carson

Single by Eddy Arnold, The Tennessee Plowboy and His Guitar
- B-side: There's Not a Thing (I Wouldn't Do for You)
- Published: February 22, 1949 by Hill and Range Songs, Inc., Hollywood, Calif.
- Released: January 21, 1949
- Recorded: December 21, 1948
- Studio: RCA Victor, New York City
- Genre: Country
- Length: 2:37
- Label: RCA Victor 48-0042
- Songwriter: Jenny Lou Carson

Eddy Arnold, The Tennessee Plowboy and His Guitar singles chronology
"A Heart Full of Love (For a Handful of Kisses) / Then I Turned and Walked Slowly Away" (1948)	"Don't Rob Another Man's Castle" (1949)	"The Echo of Your Footsteps / One Kiss Too Many" (1949)

"Don't Rob Another Man's Castle" is a song written by Jenny Lou Carson. First recorded by Eddy Arnold on December 21, 1948 at RCA Victor Studio 1 at 155 East 24th St. in New York City, the song reached No. 1 on the Billboard Folk Best Seller chart in 1949.

== Cover versions ==
- Later in 1949, Ernest Tubb and The Andrews Sisters along with The Texas Troubadors, took their version of the song to No. 10 on the Folk Best Seller List.
- in 1952, Guy Mitchell with accompaniment by Mitch Miller and his orchestra released their version.

== See also ==
- Billboard Top Folk Records of 1949
