= Why Don't You Haul Off and Love Me =

Song by Wayne Raney

Song by Wayne Raney
- B-side: "Don't Know Why"
- Released: July 9, 1949
- Recorded: May 6, 1949
- Genre: Folk, country
- Length: 3:01
- Label: King
- Songwriters: Lonnie Glosson; Wayne Raney

"Why Don't You Haul Off and Love Me" is a song first recorded in 1949 by Wayne Raney, written by Raney and his musical partner Lonnie Glosson. Raney had the most successful release of his career, when his version of "Why Don't You Haul Off and Love Me" went to number one on the Country & Western chart.

== Cover versions ==
In 1949 there were three covers of the song:

- Mervin Shiner and Bob Atcher both made the top ten on the Country & Western chart with their versions.
- Rhythm and blues singer/saxophonist, Bull Moose Jackson went to number two for two weeks on the Race Records chart with his version.

Preceded by "Lovesick Blues" by Hank Williams with His Drifting Cowboys	Best Selling Retail Country & Western Records number one single by Wayne Raney; September 10, 1949	Succeeded by "Slipping Around" by Margaret Whiting and Jimmy Wakely
