= One Kiss Too Many =

1948 song by Eddy Arnold, Steve Nelson, Ed Nelson Jr.

Single by Eddy Arnold, The Tennessee Plowboy and His Guitar
- B-side: The Echo of Your Footsteps
- Published: May 20, 1949 by Hill and Range Songs, Inc., Beverly Hills, Calif.
- Released: April 22, 1949
- Recorded: December 22, 1948
- Studio: RCA Victor Studio 1, 155 East 24th St., New York City
- Genre: Country music
- Length: 2:17
- Label: RCA Victor 48-0083
- Songwriter(s): Eddy Arnold, Steve Nelson, Ed Nelson Jr.
- Producer(s): Stephen H. Sholes

Eddy Arnold, The Tennessee Plowboy and His Guitar singles chronology
"Don't Rob Another Man's Castle" (1949)	"One Kiss Too Many" (1949)	"The Cattle Call" (1949)

"One Kiss Too Many" is a song written by Eddy Arnold, Steve Nelson and Ed Nelson Jr. The song was first performed by Arnold and reached number one on the Most-Played Juke Box Folk Records chart (one of the forerunners of the modern Hot Country Songs chart) in 1949, spending three non-consecutive weeks in the top spot. It was one of five number ones which Arnold achieved on the Juke Box Folk chart during 1949.
