= Candy Kisses (George Morgan song) =

Single by George Morgan
- B-side: "Please Don't Let Me Love You"
- Released: 1949
- Genre: Country
- Length: 2:54
- Label: Columbia Records 20547
- Songwriter: George Morgan

George Morgan singles chronology
"All I Need Is Some More Lovin'" (1949)	"Candy Kisses" (1949)	"Cry-Baby Heart" (1949)

"Candy Kisses" is a 1949 song written and recorded by American country crooner George Morgan. "Candy Kisses" was George Morgan's debut release on the charts and was his only #1 on the Best Selling Folk charts, where it stayed for three weeks. The B-side of "Candy Kisses", a song entitled, "Please Don't Let Me Love You" reached #4 on the same chart.

== Background ==
"Candy Kisses" is a song composed by country crooner George Morgan, earning that category for his smooth voice. The song developed one day in 1947 while George was on his way to work during his time at WWST radio as an early morning talent. During his commute, he hummed along to his car engine while thinking about an ex-girlfriend whom he just broke up with. He had the song roughly thought up within twenty minutes. The song became his theme song that day over at WWST and he carried his theme song with him into 1948 when he landed a regular spot at the WWVA Jamboree in Wheeling, W. Va. Morgan signed a deal with Columbia Records on September 14 that year due to the popularity of the song, but the 1948 musicians union strike prevented it from being recorded. Less than two weeks later, on September 25, he made his debut at the Grand Ole Opry as a replacement for Eddy Arnold. He stayed at the Opry for the next 27 years until his death. He recorded "Candy Kisses" on January 16, 1949 at Castle Studio in Nashville and it was released the next month. By early April it jumped to number one on the best-selling folk charts, where it remained for three weeks. By the end of the year, "Candy Kisses" had sold more than 2 million copies, and had ten top cover versions. This song was also the first song featured on the self titled album "Candy Kisses". The song was so meaningful to Morgan that he even named his first daughter Candy.

== Cover versions ==
In addition to the hit version by singer/songwriter, George Morgan, there were several other versions of the song "Candy Kisses" released in 1949. The song was first recorded by Cowboy Copas on December 21, 1948, and released in January, 1949, a month before Morgan recorded his version, and Red Foley and Elton Britt also recorded the song before Morgan. Eddy Howard, Danny Kaye, Johnny Mercer, The Fontane Sisters, Eddie Kirk and Bud Hobbs also released cover versions. Despite the many versions, George Morgan's was the only one to be positioned at No. 1 on the Billboard top 40 country hits back in 1949.
Later cover versions include:

- Bill Haley & His Comets included the song on their album Haley's Juke Box in 1960.
- In 1963 Dean Martin recorded the song for his album Dean "Tex" Martin Rides Again.
- In 1984, Jerry Lee Lewis released a version of the song on his album I Am What I Am. The song was track B1 on the album released by MCA Records.
- Eddie Cochran’s cover version of the song was released in 1997 on the Rock Star Records’ album, Rockin' It Country Style (The Legendary Chuck Foreman Recordings 1953-55).
- George Morgan's daughter, country singer Lorrie Morgan, also released her version of "Candy Kisses" on her 1998 album, The Essential Lorrie Morgan. Lorrie also sang the song at the Grand Ol’ Opry 70th Anniversary bash, singing against a backdrop of a video of her father.
