= I'm Throwing Rice (At The Girl That I Love) =

1949 song by Eddy Arnold, Steve Nelson, Ed Nelson Jr.

"I'm Throwing Rice at the Girl I Love"

Single by Eddy Arnold, The Tennessee Plowboy and His Guitar

from the album Sixteen Tons
- B-side: Show Me The Way Back To Your Heart
- Published: June 27, 1949 by Hill and Range Songs, Inc., Beverly Hills, Calif.
- Released: June 18, 1949
- Recorded: April 5, 1949
- Studio: RCA Victor Studio 1, 155 East 24th St., New York City
- Genre: Country
- Length: 2:38
- Label: RCA Victor 48-0080
- Songwriter(s): Eddy Arnold, Steve Nelson. and Edward Nelson Jr.
- Producer(s): Stephen H. Sholes

Eddy Arnold, The Tennessee Plowboy and His Guitar singles chronology
"The Cattle Call" (1949)	"I'm Throwing Rice at the Girl I Love" (1949)	"Take Me in Your Arms and Hold Me" (1950)

" I'm Throwing Rice (At The Girl That I Love)" is a 1949 hit written by Eddy Arnold, Steve Nelson and Ed Nelson, Jr. and first performed by Eddy Arnold. The Eddy Arnold version went to number one on the Country & Western Best Seller Lists for four weeks.

== Cover versions ==
- Later in 1949, Red Foley recorded his own version of the song which peaked at number eleven on the Country & Western Best Sellers charts.
