= (I'm Gonna) Sing, Sing, Sing =

Single by Hank Williams
- B-side: "Angel of Death"
- Released: 1954
- Recorded: January–March 1951, WSM Studio, Nashville
- Genre: Country
- Length: 1:55
- Label: MGM
- Songwriter(s): Hank Williams

"(I'm Gonna) Sing, Sing, Sing" is a hymn written by Hank Williams. He performed it as part of a radio show for Mother's Best Flour in Nashville from January to March 1951. MGM released the song as a posthumous single in 1954 with "Angel of Death" as the B-side. The A-side was recorded as a demo sometime in 1950.

== Sources ==
- Escott, Colin; Merritt, George; MacEwen, William (2004). Hank Williams: The Biography. New York: Little, Brown.
