= Please Don't Let Me Love You =

Single by Hank Williams
- A-side: "Faded Love and Winter Roses"
- Released: July 1955 (MGM 12029)
- Recorded: Between January and May 1949, Shreveport
- Genre: Country, folk
- Length: 2:02
- Label: MGM Records
- Songwriter: Ralph Jones

"Please Don't Let Me Love You" is a song by written by Ralph Jones and first recorded by George Morgan, who had a #4 country hit with it in 1949.

== Hank Williams version ==
In 1955, MGM acquired the Johnnie Fair Syrup shows. Between January and May 1949, Williams had pre-recorded early morning radio shows for Johnnie Fair, and MGM issued several songs from the surviving acetates as singles to satisfy the perennial demand for product by the late country singer, who was quickly becoming a mythic figure in country music. It was released as the B-side to "Faded Love and Winter Roses" and became his last solo hit, peaking at #9 on the country singles chart.
