= Wayne Raney =

American singer

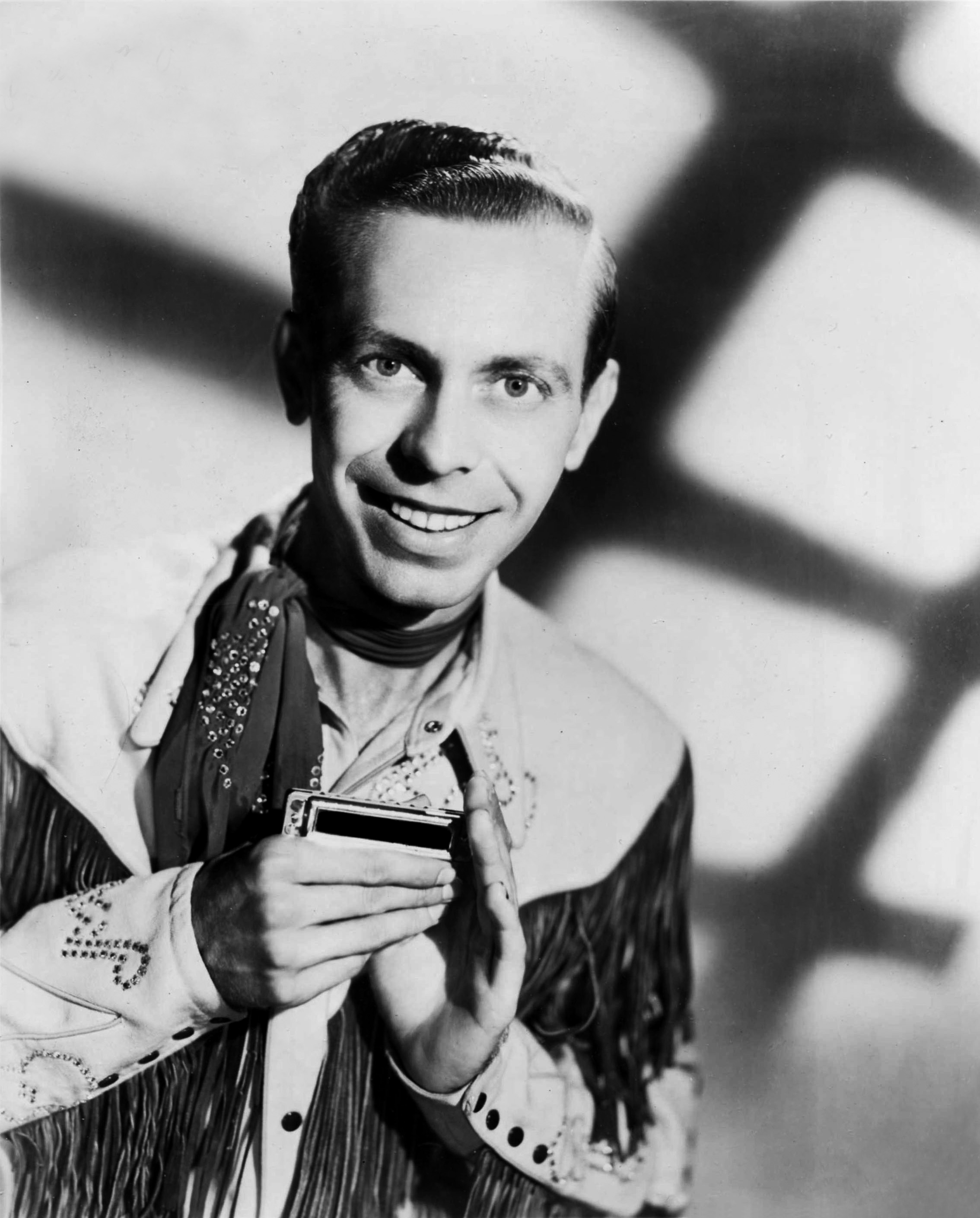
- Wayne Raney, Schaeffer Studio, Hollywood, California, 1950

Background information
- Born: August 17, 1921; Wolf Bayou, Arkansas, United States
- Died: January 23, 1993 (aged 71) Arkansas, United States
- Genres: Country
- Occupations: musician, singer
- Instrument: Harmonica
- Years active: 1934–1980s

Wayne Raney (August 17, 1921 – January 23, 1993) was an American country singer and harmonica player.

== Biography ==
Raney was born on a farm near Wolf Bayou, Cleburne County, Arkansas, United States, the youngest of five children of William Franklin (Frank) Raney and Bonnie Davis Raney. Born with a foot deformity, he could not do heavy labor. After learning to play harmonica at an early age, he moved to Piedras Negras, Mexico at age 13, where he played on radio station XEPN. He met Lonnie Glosson, his long-time musical associate, in 1936, and together they found work on radio in Little Rock in 1938. Later the pair worked for WCKY out of Cincinnati and played on syndicated radio. They also established a harmonica mail order business which ended up being enormously successful; they sold millions of harmonicas and played a major role in turning the harmonica into a popular instrument.

Raney played with the Delmore Brothers in the years after World War II, then launched a solo career in 1948; his first two singles, "Lost John Boogie" and "Jack and Jill Boogie", both reached the Top 15 of the U.S. country chart. His 1949 single, "Why Don't You Haul Off and Love Me", was a No. 1 country hit and also hit the Top 40 of the pop chart. Raney played the Grand Ole Opry in 1953, and also worked on the California Hayride and the WWVA Jamboree. Late in the 1950s he worked as a DJ, record producer, and label owner, starting Rimrock Records. He wrote the 1959 Christian revival song, "We Need a Whole Lot More of Jesus (and a Lot Less Rock and Roll)", which has been covered by numerous artists in a variety of styles. These include People!, The Greenbriar Boys and Linda Ronstadt. He recorded country music into the early 1960s, including for his own label, but ceased the mail-order business in 1960.

After returning to Arkansas, he recorded a gospel album called Don't Try to Be What You Ain't. Eventually he went into semi-retirement, running his own chicken farm and performing only occasionally in the late 1960s and 1970s. While he appeared sporadically on Hee Haw in the 1970s, he lost his voice in the 1980s and ceased performing; in 1990 he published an autobiography entitled Life Has Not Been a Bed of Roses. He died of cancer in 1993.

Raney was honored posthumously with the Arkansas Country Music Award for "Lifetime Achievement" on June 3, 2018, at the University of Arkansas, Little Rock.
