= George Morgan (singer) =

American singer-songwriter (1924–1975)

Background information
- Born: George Thomas Morgan; June 28, 1924; Waverly, Tennessee, U.S.
- Died: July 7, 1975 (aged 51) Madison, Tennessee, U.S.
- Genres: Country
- Occupation: Singer-songwriter
- Instruments: Vocals, guitar
- Years active: 1949–1975
- Labels: Columbia, Starday, Stop, Decca, MCA

George Thomas Morgan (June 28, 1924 – July 7, 1975) was a mid-20th-century American country music singer. He is a member of the Country Music Hall of Fame and a former member of the Grand Ole Opry. He is best known for his 1949 hit single "Candy Kisses". He was the father of singer Lorrie Morgan, who is also a country music star.

== Biography ==
Morgan was born to Zachariah "Zach" Morgan and Ethel Turner in Waverly, Tennessee, United States, but was raised in Barberton, Ohio. He was, along with a few other contemporaries (most notably Eddy Arnold and Jim Reeves), referred to as a "country crooner;" his singing style being more similar to that of Bing Crosby or Perry Como than that of Ernest Tubb or Lefty Frizzell.

Morgan was a member of the Grand Ole Opry since 1948, and is best remembered for the Columbia Records song "Candy Kisses", which was a No. 1 hit on the Billboard country music chart for three weeks in 1949. He also had several hits based on a "rose" theme: "Room Full of Roses", "Red Roses for a Blue Lady", and "Red Roses From the Blue Side of Town". His version of "Almost" (1952), written by Vic McAlpin and Jack Toombs, was Morgan's second million selling record. In the early 1950s he hosted a 15-minute radio program syndicated nationally by RadiOzark Enterprises in Springfield, Missouri.

In 1974, Morgan was the last person to sing on the stage of the Ryman Auditorium, before the Grand Ole Opry moved to the new Grand Ole Opry House. A week later, he was the first to sing on stage at the venue.

== Death ==
He died in 1975 of a heart attack after undergoing open heart surgery, and was interred in the Spring Hill Cemetery in Madison, Tennessee.

== Personal life ==
His daughter, country music singer Lorrie Morgan, released two songs as duets with her late father dubbed in: "I'm Completely Satisfied" (1979) and "From This Moment On" (2006).

== Discography ==
=== Albums ===
Year	Album	US Country	Label
1964	Tender Lovin' Care	17	Columbia
1964	Slippin' Around (w/ Marion Worth)	12	Columbia
1965	Red Roses for a Blue Lady	9	Columbia
1967	Candy Kisses	35	Starday
1967	Country Hits by Candlelight	33	Starday
1968	Steal Away		Starday
1968	Barbara		Starday
1969	Sounds of Goodbye		Starday
1969	Like a Bird	42	Stop
1971	Real George		Stop
1974	Red Rose from the Blue Side of Town / Somewhere Around Midnight	37	MCA
1975	A Candy Mountain Melody		MCA
1975	From This Moment On	37	4 Star

=== Singles ===
Year	Single	Chart Positions		Album
Year	Single	US Country	CAN Country	Album
1949	"Candy Kisses"	1		singles only
1949	"Please Don't Let Me Love You"	4		singles only
1949	"Rainbow in My Heart"	8		singles only
1949	"All I Need Is Some More Lovin'"	11		singles only
1949	"Room Full of Roses"^{A}	4		singles only
1949	"Cry-Baby Heart"	5		singles only
1949	"I Love Everything About You"	4		singles only
1949	"Ring on Your Finger"	15		singles only
1952	"Almost"	2		singles only
1953	"(I Just Had a Date) A Lover's Quarrel"	10		singles only
1956	"There Goes My LOVE"	15		singles only
1959	"I'm in Love Again"	3		singles only
1959	"Little Dutch Girl"	20		singles only
1959	"The Last Thing I Want to Know"	26		singles only
1960	"You're the Only Good Thing (That's Happened to Me)"	4		singles only
1964	"One Dozen Roses (And Our Love)"	23		Tender Lovin' Care
1964	"All Right (I'll Sign the Papers)"	45		Tender Lovin' Care
1964	"Slippin' Around" (w/ Marion Worth)	23		Slippin' Around
1964	"Tears and Roses"	37		singles only
1965	"Dear John"			singles only
1965	"It's All Coming Home to You But Me"			singles only
1966	"A Picture That's New"	27		singles only
1966	"Saving All My Love (For You)"			singles only
1966	"Home Is Where the Heart Is"			singles only
1966	"Married"			singles only
1966	"Speak Well of Me (To the Kids)"			singles only
1967	"I Couldn't See"	40		Candy Kisses
1967	"Shiny Red Automobile"	58		Candy Kisses
1968	"Barbara"	55		Barbara
1968	"Living"	56		Barbara
1968	"Sounds of Goodbye"	31		Sounds of Goodbye
1968	"I'll Sail My Ship Alone"			Sounds of Goodbye
1969	"Like a Bird"	30		Like a Bird
1969	"We've Done All the Lovin' We Can Do"			Real George
1969	"Enemy"			Like a Bird
1970	"Lilacs and Fire"	17		Real George
1970	"Kansas City Stockyards"			Real George
1970	"I Wouldn't Have You Any Other Way"			Real George
1971	"Rose Is Gone"			singles only
1971	"Gentle Rains of Home"	68		singles only
1973	"Let's Live Together Marianne"			singles only
1973	"Makin' Heartaches"	62	93	Red Rose from the Blue Side of Town / Somewhere Around Midnight
1973	"Mr. Ting-a-Ling (Steel Guitar Man)"	56	83	Red Rose from the Blue Side of Town / Somewhere Around Midnight
1974	"Red Rose from the Blue Side of Town"	21	19	Red Rose from the Blue Side of Town / Somewhere Around Midnight
1974	"Somewhere Around Midnight"	66		Red Rose from the Blue Side of Town / Somewhere Around Midnight
1974	"A Candy Mountain Melody"	82		A Candy Mountain Melody
1975	"In the Misty Moonlight"	65		From This Moment On
1975	"From This Moment On"	62		From This Moment On
1978	"I Just Want You to Know"			single only
1979	"I'm Completely Satisfied with You" (w/ Lorrie Morgan)	93		From This Moment On

^{A}"Room Full of Roses" also peaked at No. 25 on the Billboard Hot 100.
