= In the Jailhouse Now (album) =

Studio album by Willie Nelson, Webb Pierce
- Released: 1982
- Genre: Country
- Label: Columbia

Willie Nelson, Webb Pierce chronology
Faith, Hope and Love (1979)	In the Jailhouse Now (1982)

In the Jailhouse Now is an album by Willie Nelson and Webb Pierce, released in 1982 on the Columbia label. Richard Manuel contributed to the album.

== Critical reception ==
Professional ratings
Review scores
Source	Rating
Robert Christgau	A−
The Rolling Stone Album Guide	4/5 stars

Robert Christgau noted that "some of these remakes sound tougher and more vibrant than the originals... And the originals are honky-tonk standards for a reason."

AllMusic gave the album four-and-a-half stars. Critic Eugene Chadbourne praised the combination of different vocal styles: "Emotion is where the two really come together; they mean every word they say, and they put the lyrics across with the sentimental and meaningful spirit that is the essence of all great country & western."

== Track listing ==
Side A

1. "There Stands the Glass" (Autry Greisham, Russ Hull, Mary Jean Shurtz) [2:20]
2. "Wondering" (Joe Werner) [3:33]
3. "In the Jailhouse Now" (Jimmie Rodgers) [2:08]
4. "You're Not Mine Anymore" (Webb Pierce, Teddy Wilburn) [2:17]
5. "Heebie Jeebie Blues No. 2 (Willie Nelson, Webb Pierce, Max Powell) [2:49]

Side B

1. "Slowly" (Tommy Hill, Webb Pierce) [2:25]
2. "I Don't Care" (Webb Pierce, Cindy Walker) [2:14]
3. "Back Street Affair" (Billy Wallace, Jimmy Rule) [2:45]
4. "Let Me Be the First to Know" (Doyle Wilburn) [2:39]
5. "More and More" (Merle Kilgore, Webb Pierce) [2:09]
