= All Time Hits =

Studio album by Ernest Tubb
- Released: December 1960
- Recorded: September 21 – November 27, 1960
- Studio: Bradley Studios, Nashville, Tennessee
- Genre: Country, honky tonk
- Label: Decca
- Producer: Owen Bradley

Ernest Tubb chronology
Midnight Jamboree (1960)	All Time Hits (1960)	Golden Favorites (1961)

All Time Hits is an album by American country singer Ernest Tubb and His Texas Troubadours, recorded and released in 1960 (see 1960 in music). Despite the album title, it is not a compilation of Tubb's previous hits. The entire album consists of Tubb's covers of songs that had been hits for other country and honky-tonk singers.

== Reception ==
Professional ratings
Review scores
Source	Rating
AllMusic	4.5/5 stars

In his Allmusic review, Bruce Eder wrote of the album "The mere existence of these songs makes them priceless, as documents of Tubb's style, even if they lack the urgency of his 'own' songs."

== Track listing ==
1. "Crazy Arms" (Ralph Mooney, Chuck Seals)
2. "Wondering" (Joe Werner)
3. "Tennessee Saturday Night" (Billy Hughes)
4. "Signed, Sealed and Delivered" (Lloyd Copas, Lois Mann)
5. "Cold, Cold Heart" (Hank Williams)
6. "I'm Moving On" (Hank Snow)
7. "Wabash Cannonball" (A. P. Carter, William Kindt)
8. "I Love You So Much It Hurts" (Floyd Tillman)
9. "Bouquet of Roses" (Steve Nelson, Bob Hilliard)
10. "I Walk the Line" (Johnny Cash)
11. "Four Walls" (George Campbell, Marvin Moore)
12. "Candy Kisses" (George Morgan)

== Personnel ==
- Ernest Tubb – vocals, guitar
- Leon Rhodes – guitar
- Howard Johnson – guitar
- Grady Martin – guitar
- Buddy Emmons – pedal steel guitar
- Bobby Garrett – pedal steel guitar
- Ben Shaenfele – pedal steel guitar
- Jack Drake – bass
- Farris Coursey – drums
- Bun Wilson – drums
- Floyd Cramer – piano
