= The Wondering Boy =

Studio album by Webb Pierce
- Released: August 1956
- Genre: Country
- Label: Decca

Webb Pierce chronology
| Webb Pierce (1955) | The Wondering Boy (1956) | Just Imagination (1958) |

Singles from The Wondering Boy
- 1. "Wondering" Released: September 28, 1951; 2. "That Heart Belongs to Me" Released: May 17, 1952; 3. "Back Street Affair" Released: September 15, 1952; 4. "It's Been So Long" Released: June 17, 1953; 5. "There Stands the Glass" Released: September 21, 1953; 6. "Slowly" Released: January 8, 1954; 7. "Love Love Love" Released: September 5, 1955

The Wondering Boy is an album from honky-tonk singer Webb Pierce that was released in August 1956 on the Decca label (DL 8295). Stephen Thomas Erlewine of AllMusic called the album "one of his best albums of the '50s" with a "dynamite" track sequence.

The album included seven songs that reached No. 1 on the US country charts: "Wondering" (Jockey #1, 1952), "That Heart Belongs to Me" (Jockey #1, 1952), "Back Street Affair" (Jockey #1, Juke Box #1, Best Seller #1, 1952), "It's Been So Long" (Jockey #1, Juke Box #1, Best Seller #1, 1953), "There Stands the Glass" (Best Seller #1, Juke Box #1, Jockey #1, 1953), "Slowly" (Best Seller #1, Juke Box #1, Jockey #1, 1954), and "Love Love Love" (Jockey #1, Juke Box #1, Best Seller #1, 1955).

== Track listing ==
Side A

1. "Wondering" (Joe Werner)
2. "There Stands the Glass" (Autry Greisham, Mary Jean Shurtz, Russ Hull)
3. "That's Me Without You" (J. D. Miller)
4. "Don't Throw Your Life Away" (Billy Wallace, Webb Pierce)
5. "Love Love Love" (Ted Jarrett)
6. "If You Were Me (And I Were You)" (Frank Miller, Webb Pierce)

Side B

1. "Back Street Affair" (Billy Wallace)
2. "It's Been So Long" (Autry Greisham)
3. "Slowly" (Tommy Hill, Webb Pierce)
4. "That Heart Belongs to Me" (Webb Pierce)
5. "Yes I Know Why" (Webb Pierce)
6. "I'm Gonna Fall Out of Love With You" (Martha Ellis Taylor, Randy Hughes)
