= Luderin Darbone =

American fiddler

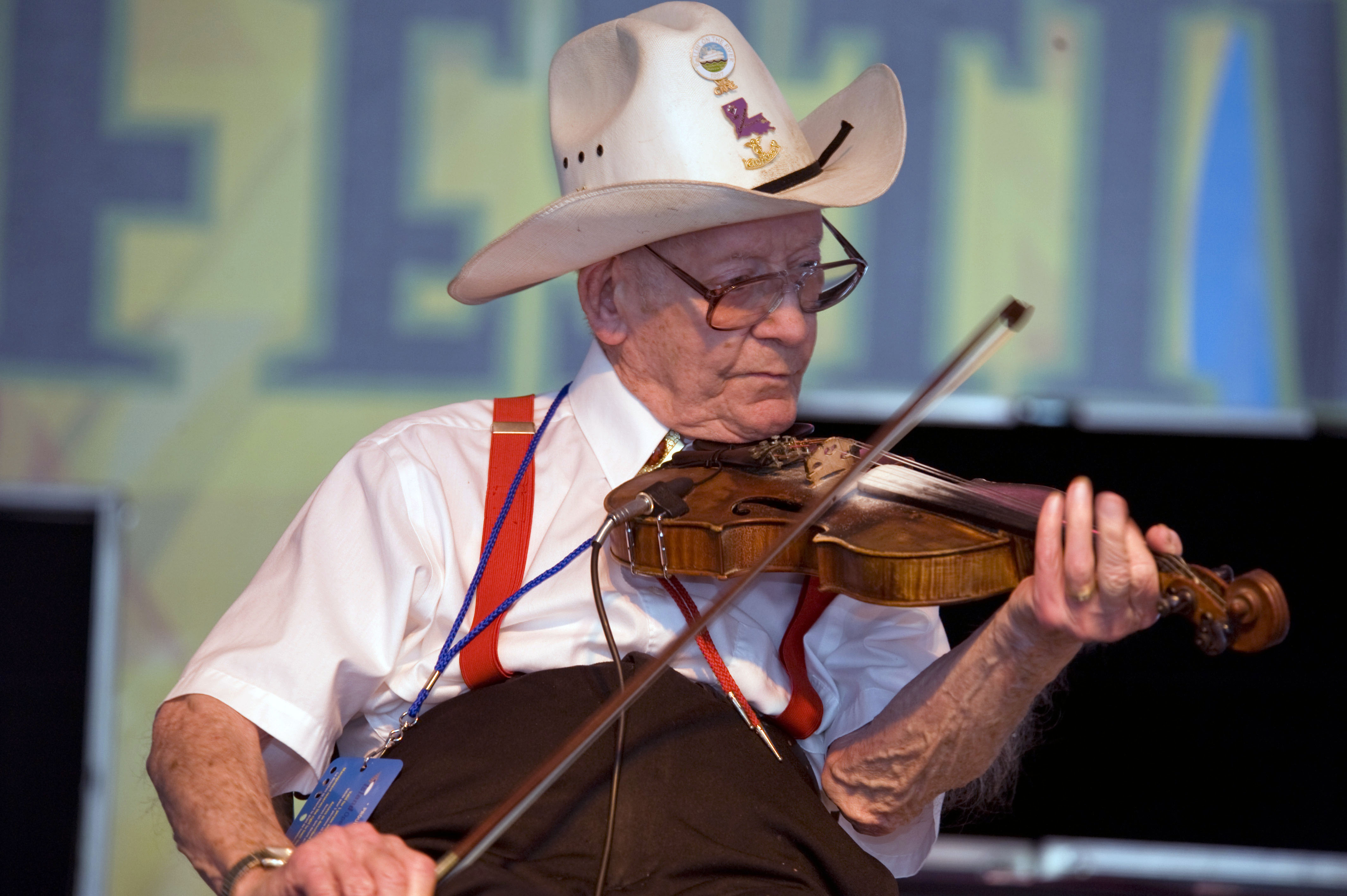
- Darbone performing in 2008

Background information
- Born: January 14, 1913; Evangeline Parish, Louisiana, U.S.
- Origin: Orangefield, Texas, U.S.
- Died: November 21, 2008 (aged 95)
- Genre: Cajun
- Occupations: Musician, fiddler
- Instrument: Fiddle
- Formerly of: Hackberry Ramblers

Luderin Lawrence Darbone (January 14, 1913 – November 21, 2008), was a Cajun-Western swing fiddle player for the band Hackberry Ramblers.

== Early life ==
Darbone was born in Evangeline Parish, Louisiana. He was the son of Edvard "Eddie" Darbone. He credited his longevity and inspiration to his wife Mary Lou. He was born in Evangeline and raised in Orangefield, Texas. His parents gave him his first fiddle at the age of 12 and he learned to play through a correspondence course.

== Career ==
In 1930 he met guitarist Edwin Duhon and together they formed the nucleus of a band they named the Hackberry Ramblers in honor of their hometown. By 1933 they were on the radio and signed with RCA Bluebird Records. In 1936, they recorded "Jolie Blonde", "Oh Josephine, Ma Josephine", "One Step De L'Amour" and "Faux Pas Tu Bray Cherie". Darbone and Duhon were the first musicians to bring electronic amplification to area dance halls, running a public address system off the idling engine of Darbone's Model-A Ford. They were also the first Cajun music group to perform while standing as opposed to sitting. Their eclectic repertoire included Cajun music, country music and Western swing, jazz music, and blues music, in both English and French. Due to a sponsorship deal with Montgomery Ward, the band adopted the name "The Riverside Ramblers".

In 2002, Darbone and Duhon received a prestigious National Heritage Fellowship from the Folk Arts Program of the National Endowment for the Arts.

Darbone died on November 21, 2008, in Sulphur, Louisiana.

== See also ==
- History of Cajun Music
- List of Notable People Related to Cajun Music
