= Bonnie Blue (disambiguation) =

Bonnie Blue (born 1999) is an English pornographic film actress and content creator.

Bonnie Blue may also refer to:

== Arts and entertainment ==
- The Bonnie Blue, 1988 album by the Corries
- Eugenie Victoria "Bonnie Blue" Butler, a character in the novel Gone with the Wind

== Objects and places ==
- Bonnie Blue flag, associated with the former Confederate States of America
- Bonnie Blue Southern Market & Bakery in Winchester, Virginia
- Bonny Blue, Virginia, also referred to as Bonnie Blue.

== See also ==
- Bonnie Blue Eyes (disambiguation)
- "The Bonnie Blue Flag", marching song used by the Confederate States of America
- "The Bonnie Blue Gal", 1955 song by Mitch Miller and His Orchestra and Chorus
- "Bonnie Blue: James Cotton's Life in the Blues", 2025 documentary about James Cotton
