= The Webb Pierce Story =

Studio album by Webb Pierce
- Released: 1964
- Genre: Country
- Label: Decca

Webb Pierce chronology
Bow Thy Head (1963)	The Webb Pierce Story (1964)	Sands of Gold (1964)

The Webb Pierce Story is a double album of the greatest hits of Webb Pierce. It was released in 1964 on the Decca label (DL 4482). It reached No. 13 on the Billboard country albums chart. The tracks are mostly re-recorded versions in stereo.

== Track listing ==
Side A

1. "In the Jailhouse Now" (Jimmie Rodgers) [2:07]
2. "Wondering" (Joe Werner) [3:00]
3. "I'm Walking The Dog" (Cliff Grimsley, Tex Grimsley) [1:57]
4. "Slowly" (Tommy Hill, Webb Pierce) [2:16]
5. "More and More" (Merle Kilgore) [2:10]
6. "There Stands the Glass" (Autry Greisham, Mary Jean Shutz, Russ Hull) [2:41]

Side B

1. "Honky Tong Song" (Buck Peddy, Mel Tillis) [2:02]
2. "Back Street Affair" (Billy Wallace) [2:47]
3. "Love Love Love" (Ted Jarrett) [2:02]
4. "Missing You" (Dale E. Noe, Red Sovine) [2:12]
5. "If You Were Me (And I Were You)" (Frank Miller, Webb Pierce) [2:32]
6. "Falling Back To You" (Bill Phillips, Webb Pierce) [2:30

Side C

1. "I Ain't Never" (Mel Tillis, Webb Pierce) [1:55]
2. "Is It Wrong" (Warner McPherson) [2:10]
3. "I'm Tired" (A.R. Peddy, Mel Tillis, Ray Price) [2:00]
4. "Walking The Streets" (Gene Evans, Jimmy Fields, Jimmy Littlejohn) [2:45]
5. "No Love Have I" (Mel Tillis) [2:27]
6. "Don't Do It, Darlin" (Webb Pierce) [3:14]

Side D

1. "Tupelo County Jail" (Mel Tillis, Webb Pierce) [1:53]
2. "You're Not Mine Any More" (Teddy Wilburn, Webb Pierce) [2:14]
3. "Alla My Love" (Harold Donny, Jimmy Gateley) [2:27]
4. "That's Me Without You" (J.D. Miller) [1:55]
5. "I Don't Care" (Cindy Walker, Webb Pierce) [2:08]
6. "It's My Way" (Wayne Walker, Webb Pierce) [2:27]
