= Golden Favorites =

Golden Favorites may refer to:

- Golden Favorites (Caterina Valente album)
- Golden Favorites (Ernest Tubb album), 1961 album
