= Bonnie Blue Eyes =

Bonnie Blue Eyes may refer to:

- "Bonnie Blue Eyes", folk song with Roud Index number 762
- "Bonnie Blue Eyes", 1935 recording by the Hackberry Ramblers
- Loeta Applegate, American singer who recorded duets with Bob Atcher as "Bonnie Blue Eyes"

== See also ==
- Bonnie Blue (disambiguation)
