= Honky Tong Song =

"Honky Tonk Song"

Song by Webb Pierce
- Released: 1957
- Genre: Country
- Length: 2:04
- Label: Decca
- Songwriter(s): Mel Tillis, Buck Peddy

"Honky Tonk Song" is a country music song recorded by Webb Pierce. The song was co-written by Mel Tillis and Buck Peddy. It was released in 1957 on the Decca label.

The song's lyrics tell of a man who rents a room in a cheap motel. He can't sleep, because the band in the joint downstairs keeps playing with a honky tonk beat, shaking his bed. The man is also blue because his woman left him and took all his money.

In March 1957, the song reached the No. 1 spot on the "Country & Western Records Most Played By Folk Disk Jockeys" chart. It peaked at No. 2 on the Best Seller chart and No. 7 on the Juke Box chart.

The song has been included in multiple albums and compilations of Pierce's music, including The Webb Pierce Story (1964), the Bear Family box set, The Wondering Boy (1951-1958) (1990), King of the Honky-Tonk: From the Original Master Tapes (1994), and 20th Century Masters - The Millennium Collection: The Best of Webb Pierce (2001).

The song has also been covered by other artists, including Mel Tillis, Dude Mowrey, Conway Twitty, Faron Young, Carl Perkins, Leon McAuliffe, Leroy Van Dyke, Charlie Walker, Jimmie Dale Gilmore, Commander Cody and His Lost Planet Airmen, Warner Mack, BR549, and Guy Clark.

== Charts ==
Chart (1957)	Peak position
Most-Played Juke Box (Country & Western) Records	7
Best-Selling Retail Folk (Country & Western) Records	2
Country & Western Records Most Played By Folk Disk Jockeys	1
