= Memory No. 1 =

Memory #1

Studio album by Webb Pierce
- Released: 1965
- Genre: Country
- Label: Decca

Webb Pierce chronology
Sands of Gold (1964)	Memory #1 (1965)	Country Music Time (1965)

Memory #1 is an album from Webb Pierce that was released in 1965 on the Decca label (DL 4604). AllMusic gave the album four-and-a-half stars. The album was Pierce's highest charting album, reaching No. 6 on the Billboard Top Country Albums chart.

== Track listing ==
Side A

1. "That's Where My Money Goes"
2. "Leavin' on Your Mind "
3. "Waiting a Lifetime"
4. "Invisible Tears"
5. "French Riviera"
6. "Love Come to Me"

Side B

1. "Broken Engagement"
2. "Here I Am Drunk Again"
3. "With You by My Side"
4. "I'm Gonna Hang One on Tonight"
5. "As Long as I'll Forgive"
6. "Memory #1"
