= Webb with a Beat =

Studio album by Webb Pierce
- Released: 1960
- Genre: Country
- Label: Decca

Webb Pierce chronology
Webb! (1959)	Webb with a Beat (1960)	Walking the Streets (1960)

Webb with a Beat is an album by Webb Pierce that was released in 1960 on the Decca label (DL 8899). George Bedard of AllMusic noted: "The title is a bit misleading, but "I Ain't Never" definitely rocks."

== Track listing ==
Side A

1. "I Ain't Never" (Mel Tillis, Webb Pierce)
2. "It's My Way" (Wayne Walker)
3. "Gotta Travel On" (Paul Clayton)
4. "I've Got My Fingers Crossed" (George McCormick, Wayne Walker)
5. "I'll Never Have To Be Alone" (Mel Tillis)
6. "Whirlpool Of Love" (Gary Williams, Webb Pierce)

Side B

1. "No Love Have I" (Mel Tillis)
2. "Is It Wrong (For Loving You)" (Warner MacPherson)
3. "I'm Tired" (A.R. Peddy, Mel Tillis, Ray Price)
4. "Poison Love" (Elmer Laird)
5. "Public Enemy Number One" (Gary Williams, Webb Pierce)
6. "In the Jailhouse Now" (Jimmie Rodgers)
