= Webb! =

Studio album by Webb Pierce
- Released: 1959
- Genre: Country
- Label: Decca

Webb Pierce chronology
Bound for the Kingdom (1958)	Webb! (1959)	Webb with a Beat (1960)

Webb! is an album by Webb Pierce that was released in 1959 on the Decca label (DL 8899). He was accompanied on the album by Owen Bradley and His Orchestra. Stephen Cook of AllMusic noted: "Topped off with Owen Bradley's clean musical backing, Webb! is a rare gem from the days before Pierce and his honky tonk kind were squeezed out by crossover country's arrival on the scene."

== Track listing ==
Side A

1. "After the Boy Gets the Girl" (Wayne Walker)
2. "I Owe It to My Heart (Johnny Mathis, Webb Pierce)
3. "My Shoes Keep Walking Back to You" (Bob Wills, Lee Ross)
4. "Life to Go" (George Jones)
5. "Sittin' Alone" (Webb Pierce)
6. "You Make Me Live Again" (Ray Price, Wayne Walker)

Side B

1. "Pick Me Up on Your Way Down" (Harlan Howard)
2. "The Violet and the Rose" (Bud Auge, John Renfield, Mel Tillis)
3. "Tupelo County Jail" (Mel Tillis, Webb Pierce)
4. "Crazy Arms" (Chuck Seals, Ralph Mooney)
5. "Falling Back to You" (Bill Phillips (4), Webb Pierce)
6. "I Won't Be Cryin' Anymore" (Wynn Blackbourn)
