= Webb's Choice =

Studio album by Webb Pierce
- Released: 1966
- Genre: Country
- Label: Decca

Webb Pierce chronology
Sweet Memories (1966)	Webb's Choice (1966)	Where'd Ya Stay Last Night (1967)

Webb's Choice is an album by Webb Pierce that was released in 1964 on the Decca label (DL 4782). Greg Adams of AllMusic called it "a fine album on which Pierce stretches just a little bit."

== Track listing ==
Side A

1. "He Ain't No Better Than Me" (Max Powell, Wayne Walker)
2. "Danny Boy" (Fred E. Weatherly)
3. "San Antonio Rose" (Bob Wills)
4. "If It's Not Too Late To Ask" (Merle Kilgore)
5. "Ring Around The Roses" (Jan Crutchfield)
6. "When Passion Calls" (Max Powell, Wayne Walker)

Side B

1. "Cotton Fields"
2. "A Fallen Star" (James Joiner)
3. "Time Changes Everything" (Tommy Duncan)
4. "A Taste Of Heaven" (David Briggs, Jimmy Rule)
5. "The Bottle Is Just Fooling You" (Max Powell, Wayne Walker)
6. "Don't Think I'm Not Thankful" (Max Powell)
