= Cross Country (Webb Pierce album) =

Studio album by Webb Pierce
- Released: 1962
- Genre: Country
- Label: Decca

Webb Pierce chronology
Hideaway Heart (1962)	Cross Country (1962)	I've Got a New Heartache (1963)

Cross Country is an album by Webb Pierce that was released in 1960 on the Decca label (DL 4294). AllMusic gave the album four-and-a-half stars.

In Billboard magazine's annual poll of country and western disc jockeys, it was ranked No. 10 among the "Favorite Country Music LPs" of 1962.

Although Billboard's Top Country Albums chart did not exist when the album was released, Cross Country was still on the chart when it started in January 1964 and registered at the No. 20 spot.

== Track listing ==
Side A

1. "Heartaches by the Number" (Harlan Howard) [2:43]
2. "You Are My Life" (Louis Blackburn) [2:32]
3. "Waterloo" (John D. Loudermilk, Marijohn Wilkin) [2:40]
4. "Cry, Cry, Darling" (J.D. Miller, Jimmy Newman) [2:32]
5. "Free of the Blues" (D. C. Mullins]
6. "I'm Letting You Go" (Vanadore, Drusky) [2:15]

Side B

1. "Take Time" (Harry Hart, Marijohn Wilkin, Mel Tillis) [2:00]
2. "Someday You'll Call My Name" (Eddie Hill, Jean Branch) [2:34]
3. "Alla My Love" (Harold Donny, Jimmy Gately) [2:27]
4. "Crazy Wild Desire" (Mel Tillis) [2:21]
5. "I'm Fallin' in Love with You" (Mel Tillis, Wayne Walker) [2:00]
6. "I Close My Eyes" (Wayne P. Walker) [2:35]
