= I'm Gonna Be a Swinger =

I'm Gonna Be A Swinger

Studio album by Webb Pierce
- Released: 1973
- Genre: Country
- Label: Decca

Webb Pierce chronology
Road Show (1971)	I'm Gonna Be A Swinger (1973)	Faith, Hope and Love (1979)

I'm Gonna Be A Swinger is an album by Webb Pierce that was released in 1973 on the Decca label (DL 75393). It was Pierce's final album for Decca, after 21 years with the label.

The title track, "I'm Gonna Be a Swinger", was a minor hit, peaking at No. 54 Hot Country Songs chart.

AllMusic gave the album two-and-a-half stars. Critic Greg Adams called it "a fascinating album", but a throwback that was not likely to win many new fans.

Critic Al Freeders wrote that the album "gets things going for Webb as he starts to become very active in the business once again."

== Track listing ==
Side A

1. "I'm Gonna Be A Swinger" (Pierce, Ward) [2:14]
2. "Someday" (Sonny Curtis, Webb Pierce)
3. "When My Blue Moon Turns Gold"
4. "Take These Chains From My Heart"
5. "Daddy's Not Dead" (spoken word portions by Koko the Clown)
6. "Whiskey Is The Devil (In Liquid Form)" (additional vocals by Johnny Bailes)

Side B

1. "On The Banks Of The Old Pontchartrain"
2. "Am I Losing You?"
3. "You're Letting Me Go "
4. "Wonderful, Wonderful, Wonderful"
5. "I Miss The Little Things"
