= Hackberry Ramblers =

American musical group

- Also known as: Riverside Ramblers
- Origin: Hackberry, Louisiana
- Genres: Cajun, country, Western swing, jazz, blues
- Years active: 1930–2005
- Labels: Bluebird, Montgomery Ward, De Luxe, Arhoolie, Goldband
- Past members: Luderin Darbone; Edwin Duhon; Alvin Ellander; Joe Werner; John Parker; Glen Croker; Johnny Faulk; Ben Sandmel

The Hackberry Ramblers, also known as the Riverside Ramblers, were a Cajun music band based in Hackberry, Louisiana. Formed in 1933, the group performed for over 70 years.

The band was active from 1933 until 2005, with some appearances after that date. The lineup changed several times, but the founders—fiddler Luderin Darbone (1913–2008) and accordionist Edwin Duhon (1910–2006)—led the group until Duhon died in 2006. While they focused on Cajun music, the Ramblers also played other American styles, including Western swing, blues, and rockabilly.

== Early years ==
In 1930, fiddler Luderin Darbone and guitarist Edwin Duhon met in Hackberry, Louisiana, and started playing music together. Duhon played the accordion at first. However, his instrument broke, and he could not replace it. Also, the popular country music coming from Nashville radio did not use accordions. Because of this, Duhon switched to the guitar. The first version of the band had one fiddle and two guitars.

By 1933, the band was on the radio and had signed with RCA's Bluebird Records. Darbone and Duhon chose the name "Hackberry Ramblers" around this time. Darbone said in an interview that they wanted a catchy name for the radio. He noted they were the first Cajun band to use a group name instead of their own names. They broadcast from the Majestic Hotel in Lake Charles, Louisiana on station KFBL. In 1936, the group recorded "Jolie Blonde", "Oh Josephine, Ma Josephine", "One Step De L'Amour", and "Faux Pas Tu Bray Cherie". Darbone and Duhon were among the first musicians to use electronic amplification in local dance halls. Around 1932, they ran a public address system using the engine of Darbone's Model-A Ford.

They played a mix of Cajun music, country music, Western swing, jazz music, and blues music. They sang in both English and French, covering artists such as Bob Wills, Jimmie Rodgers, and Bessie Smith. The band used the name "The Riverside Ramblers" for a sponsorship deal with Montgomery Ward.

Guitarist and vocalist Joe Werner (1909–1978) joined the Riverside Ramblers in 1936. The group recorded "Wondering" in 1937, but Werner left the band the next year.

== Later years ==
In the 1960s, Chris Strachwitz (1931–2023) of Arhoolie Records began recording the group. They continued to perform at festivals, such as FitzGerald's American Music Festival in 1997.

In 2002, Darbone and Duhon received a National Heritage Fellowship from the Folk Arts Program of the National Endowment for the Arts.

Before Duhon died in 2006, the band's members included Darbone, Duhon, Ben Sandmel on drums, Glen Croker (died 2011) on guitar, and Johnny Faulk on bass.

The Country Music Hall of Fame holds several of the founding members' instruments in its collection.

== See also ==
- History of Cajun Music
- List of Notable People Related to Cajun Music

== Other sources ==
- Musician Edwin Duhon dead at 95 United Press International, Inc. Retrieved 20 Mar 2006.
- Sandmel, Ben. "Cajun At The Country Music Hall Of Fame". ZydE-Zine. Retrieved 14 August 2005.
- John Wirt, "‘Hackberry Ramblers’ Co-founder Dead at 95," The Advocate [Baton Rouge, La.], 23 November 2008, http://www.2theadvocate.com/news/34944819.html, accessed 1 December 2008.
- Luderin Darbone 1913-2008 Arhoolie Records.
