= Webb Pierce Sings This Thing =

Studio album by Webb Pierce
- Released: 1969
- Genre: Country
- Label: Decca

Webb Pierce chronology
Saturday Night (1968)	Webb Pierce Sings This Thing (1969)	Love Ain't Never Gonna Be No Better (1970)

Webb Pierce Sings This Thing is an album by Webb Pierce that was released in 1964 on the Decca label (DL 75132). The album reached No. 42 on the Top Country Albums chart. Greg Adams of AllMusic praised "the consistent quality and sound" of Pierce's music in the 1960s, and called it "a solid album that is sure to please Pierce's fans."

== Track listing ==
Side A

1. "This Thing" [2:12]
2. "Does My Memory Ever Cross Your Mind" [2:20]
3. "No Tears Tonight" [2:20]
4. "If I Had Last Night to Live Over Again" [2:29]
5. "I Get So Mad at Me" [2:08]
6. "I Go On Loving You" [2:50]

Side B

1. "You're the Reason" [2:17]
2. "Scattered Roses" [2:23]
3. "Lo-Lenna" [2:04]
4. "I Caused You to Give Your Love Away" [2:27]
5. "There's No Need to Try" [2:44]
