= Commodore Point =

Former Ford manufacturing facility in Florida, United States

Coordinates: 30.32886°N 81.62794°W

Commodore Point was a Ford Motor Company manufacturing plant in Jacksonville, Florida. It was located on the banks of the St. Johns River just below the Mathews Bridge. It occupied the former Bentley Shipyards. The factory began operations in November 1924, building the Ford Model T followed later by the Ford Model A. The factory was closed in 1932, where Ford continued to use the building as a parts distribution center until 1968.
