= Fallen Angel (Webb Pierce album) =

Studio album by Webb Pierce
- Released: 1960
- Genre: Country
- Label: Decca

Webb Pierce chronology
Walking the Streets (1960)	Fallen Angel (1960)	Hideaway Heart (1962)

Fallen Angel is an album by Webb Pierce that was released in May 1961 on the Decca label (DL 4144). Greg Adams of AllMusic described it as "crisp and precise country-pop songs given a hint of rock & roll flavor with prominent drums and electric bass."

== Track listing ==
Side A

1. "Fallen Angel" (Marijohn Wilkin, Wayne P. Walker)
2. "A Rose and a Thorn" (Wayne P. Walker*, Webb Pierce)
3. "Let Forgiveness In" (Webb Pierce)
4. "So Used to Loving You" (Tommy Hill, Webb Pierce)
5. "There's More Pretty Girls Than One" (Alton Delmore, Arthur Smith)
6. "Forgive Me" (Gene Sullivan, Wiley Walker)

Side B

1. "Truck Driver's Blues" (Ted Daffan)
2. "Is My Ring On Your Finger" (Wayne P. Walker)
3. "My Rough and Rowdy Ways" (Elsie McWilliams, Jimmie Rodgers)
4. "A Walk On the Wild Side Of Life" (Wayne P. Walker)
5. "No One But Me" (Don Winters)
6. "Last Night" (Warner McPherson, Webb Pierce)
