= Edwin Duhon =

American musician

- Born: June 11, 1910; Broussard, Louisiana, U.S.
- Died: February 26, 2006 (aged 95) Westlake, Louisiana
- Genres: Folk, Cajun, country/Texas swing Cajun
- Occupation: Musician
- Instruments: Guitar, accordion
- Formerly of: Hackberry Ramblers

Edwin Duhon (11 June 1910 – 26 February 2006) was an American musician and co-founder of the Hackberry Ramblers, a band playing a combination of Cajun music, Western swing, and country music.

Duhon was born in Broussard, Louisiana. He formed the Hackberry Ramblers along with fiddler Luderin Darbone in 1933. He first played acoustic guitar and went on to play electric guitar, piano, double bass, harmonica, and accordion at various times. He focused solely on the accordion from the mid-1990s. Duhon's last performance was in November 2005.

In 2002, Duhon and Darbone received a National Heritage Fellowship from the U.S. National Endowment for the Arts, which is the country's highest honor in the folk and traditional arts.

Duhon died at the age of 95 in Westlake, Louisiana.

== See also ==
- History of Cajun Music
- List of Notable People Related to Cajun Music
