= That Heart Belongs to Me =

Single by Webb Pierce
- A-side: "So Used to Loving You"
- Released: May 1952
- Genre: Country
- Length: 2:51
- Label: Decca
- Songwriter: Webb Pierce

"That Heart Belongs to Me" is a country music song written and recorded by Webb Pierce. It was released in 1952 on the Decca label. In June 1952, the song reached the No. 1 spot on the Jockey chart. It peaked at No. 2 on the Juke Box chart and No. 5 on the Best Seller chart. In Billboard's year-end country chart for 1952, it ranked No. 20.

The song's lyrics bemoan a world full of "flirty guys" with "flirty, flirty ways" and warns the singer's girl not to let them steal her heart, because her heart belongs to the singer.

Since its original release in 1952, the song has been included in multiple albums and compilations of Pierce's music, including The Wondering Boy (1956), The Webb Pierce Story (1964), and the Bear Family box set, The Wondering Boy (1951-1958) (1990).

The song has also been covered by other artists, including Mickey Gilley, Hank Snow, Roy Drusky, George Jones, Carl Smith, Dickey Lee, Hugh X. Lewis, and Lionel Cartwright.

== Charts ==
Chart (1952)	Peak position
Most-Played Juke Box (Country & Western) Records	2
Best-Selling Retail Folk (Country & Western) Records	5
Country & Western Records Most Played By Folk Disk Jockeys	1
