= Sands of Gold =

Studio album by Webb Pierce
- Released: 1964
- Genre: Country
- Label: Decca

Webb Pierce chronology
The Webb Pierce Story (1964)	Sands of Gold (1964)	Memory #1 (1965)

Sands of Gold is an album by Webb Pierce that was released in 1964 on the Decca label (DL 4486). Greg Adams of AllMusic called it "one of Pierce's best albums of the '60s."

== Track listing ==
Side A

1. "Please Help Me, I'm Falling" (Hal Blair, Don Robertson)
2. "Sands Of Gold"
3. "Blue Mood"
4. "Don't Let Me Cross Over" (Joe Penny)
5. "Roses Are Red (My Love)"
6. "My Love For You"

Side B

1. "Detroit City" (Danny Dill, Mel Tillis)
2. "Those Wonderful Years"
3. "Nobody's Darling But Mine"
4. "If The Back Door Could Talk"
5. "True Love Never Dies" (Webb Pierce)
6. "The Smile Of A Clown"
