= On Tour (Ernest Tubb album) =

Live album by Ernest Tubb
- Released: October 1962
- Recorded: September 1961–April 1962
- Studio: Cain's Ballroom (Tulsa, Oklahoma); Columbia (Nashville, Tennessee)
- Genre: Country, honky tonk
- Label: Decca
- Producer: Owen Bradley

Ernest Tubb chronology
Golden Favorites (1961)	On Tour (1962)	Just Call Me Lonesome (1963)

On Tour is a live and studio album by American country singer Ernest Tubb, released in 1962 (see 1962 in music).

Professional ratings
Review scores
Source	Rating
AllMusic	2.5/5 stars

== Track listing ==
1. "The Women Make a Fool Out of Me" (Johnny Bond)
2. "Go on Home" (Hank Cochran)
3. "Steel Guitar Rag" (Merle Travis, Cliffie Stone, Leon McAuliffe)
4. "Old Love, New Tears" (Leon Rhodes, Clay Allen)
5. "Try Me One More Time" (Ernest Tubb)
6. "Lover's Waltz" (Leon Rhodes, Clay Allen)
7. "Drivin' Nails in My Coffin" (Jerry Irby)
8. "Out of My Mind" (Leon Rhodes, Arvel Bourquin)
9. "Red Skin Rag" (Bob Kiser, Leon McAuliffe)
10. "Watching My Past Go By" (Ernest Tubb)
11. "Bandera Waltz" (O. B. "Easy" Adams)
12. "In and Out (of Every Heart in Town)" (Hugh Ashley)

== Personnel ==
- Ernest Tubb – vocals, guitar
- Johnny Johnson – guitar
- Leon Rhodes – guitar
- Grady Martin – guitar
- Buddy Charleton – pedal steel guitar
- Jack Drake – bass
- Jan Kurtis – drums
- Floyd Cramer – piano
