= Golden Favorites (Ernest Tubb album) =

Studio album by Ernest Tubb
- Released: 1961
- Recorded: 1958–59
- Studio: Bradley Studios, Nashville, Tennessee
- Genre: Country, honky tonk
- Label: Decca
- Producer: Owen Bradley

Ernest Tubb chronology
All Time Hits (1960)	Golden Favorites (1961)	On Tour (1962)

Golden Favorites is an album by American country music singer Ernest Tubb, released in 1961. The songs are re-recordings of previous releases by Tubb.

== Reception ==
Professional ratings
Review scores
Source	Rating
AllMusic	3/5 stars

In his AllMusic review, George Bedard wrote of the album "These re-recordings of older material are well-done, but it would be better to have the originals."

== Track listing ==
1. "I'll Get Along Somehow" (Ernest Tubb)
2. "Slippin' Around" (Floyd Tillman)
3. "Filipino Baby" (Billy Cox, Clarke Van Ness)
4. "When the World Has Turned You Down" (Tubb)
5. "Have You Ever Been Lonely (Have You Ever Been Blue)" (Peter De Rose, Billy Hill)
6. "There's a Little Bit of Everything in Texas" (Tubb)
7. "Walking the Floor Over You" (Tubb)
8. "Driftwood on the River" (Bob Miller, John Klenner)
9. "There's Nothing More to Say" (Tubb)
10. "Rainbow at Midnight" (Lost John Miller)
11. "I'll Always Be Glad to Take You Back" (Tubb)
12. "Let's Say Goodbye Like We Said Hello" (Tubb, Ernest Skinner)

== Personnel ==
- Ernest Tubb – vocals, guitar
- Billy Byrd – guitar
- Grady Martin – guitar
- Buddy Emmons – pedal steel guitar
- Jack Drake – bass
- Buddy Harman – drums
- Farris Coursey – drums
- Floyd Cramer – piano
- Tommy Jackson – fiddle
- The Jordanaires – background vocals
- The Anita Kerr Singers – background vocals
