= Bonnie Blue Southern Market & Bakery =

Restaurant in Winchester, Virginia

- U.S. National Register of Historic Places
- U.S. Historic district – Contributing property
- Bonnie Blue Southern Market & Bakery photographed by Carol M. Highsmith in 2019

- Location within Virginia Location within the United States
- Location: 334 West Boscawen Street, Winchester, Virginia, US
- Coordinates: 39°11′11.45″N 78°10′19.19″W
- Website: https://winchestersbestbbq.com/
- Part of: Winchester Historic District (3rd boundary increase)
- NRHP reference No.: 15000963
- Designated CP: January 5, 2016

Bonnie Blue Southern Market & Bakery, more commonly known as Bonnie Blue, is a restaurant located at 334 West Boscawen Street in Winchester, Virginia, United States. It specializes in barbecuing various meats, and offers side dishes and baked goods. The meat and other items are often purchased from local producers. The restaurant opened in 2012 inside a former Esso gas station built in 1920. It is sited at the triangular intersection of Amherst Street (U.S. Route 50) and West Boscawen Street. The restaurant is named after the Bonnie Blue flag used by the short-lived Republic of West Florida. The building is painted light blue to signify the name. Bonnie Blue eventually outgrew its original space and expanded into an adjoining building. The restaurant is decorated with eclectic signs and objects.

During its history, Bonnie Blue has become a popular place, lauded in local and national news. A 2016 article in The New York Times listing Bonnie Blue as one of 13 essential barbecue restaurants to visit brought much attention to the restaurant. The restaurant has been mentioned in The Washington Post on several occasions. The restaurant and its staff have often donated food and labor to nonprofits and other groups, including the local free clinic, earthquake victims, veterans, and a local HIV/AIDS nonprofit. In 2015 and 2016, the restaurant's main building and the adjoining space were designated as contributing properties to the Winchester Historic District, which is listed on the National Register of Historic Places and Virginia Landmarks Register.

== History ==
=== Early history ===
The building housing Bonnie Blue Southern Market & Bakery, commonly known as Bonnie Blue, is located at 334 West Boscawen Street in Winchester, Virginia. It was built in 1920 in the American Craftsman style. It previously operated as an Esso gas station. Adjoining industrial commercial buildings, 330-332 West Boscawen Street, were added in 1945. An expansion to the Esso building was added in 1957. At some point the property also served as a car dealership. In May 2006, Ross's Carpet & Floors opened in the space, but later moved to a new location on West Hart Street.

Two businessmen, Brian Pellatt and Christian Schweiger, organized as Bonnie Blue Partners. The owners wanted to welcome locals and visitors into Winchester at the triangular intersection of Amherst Street (U.S. Route 50) and West Boscawen Street, putting an emphasis on offering food and other items from nearby suppliers when available. After purchasing the property, which was dilapidated, the two spent over four months renovating the building, keeping some of the architectural details. Bonnie Blue opened on September 23, 2012.

According to Schweiger, the restaurant's décor and name were inspired by the Bonnie Blue flag used by the short-lived Republic of West Florida (RWF). There is a single white star on the blue flag. The restaurant itself is painted the same color blue as the one used by the RWF. Both owners incorporated a mixture of their respective home state's culinary traditions. Pellat brought his knowledge of North Carolina cuisine, including barbecue, and Schweiger, being from Texas, spent time learning barbecue techniques there. In addition to barbecue, a variety of other meats, vegetables, cheeses, apple butter, and other food items, are sold. Prepared baked goods include biscuits, cakes, cookies, muffins, and croissants.

=== 2010s ===
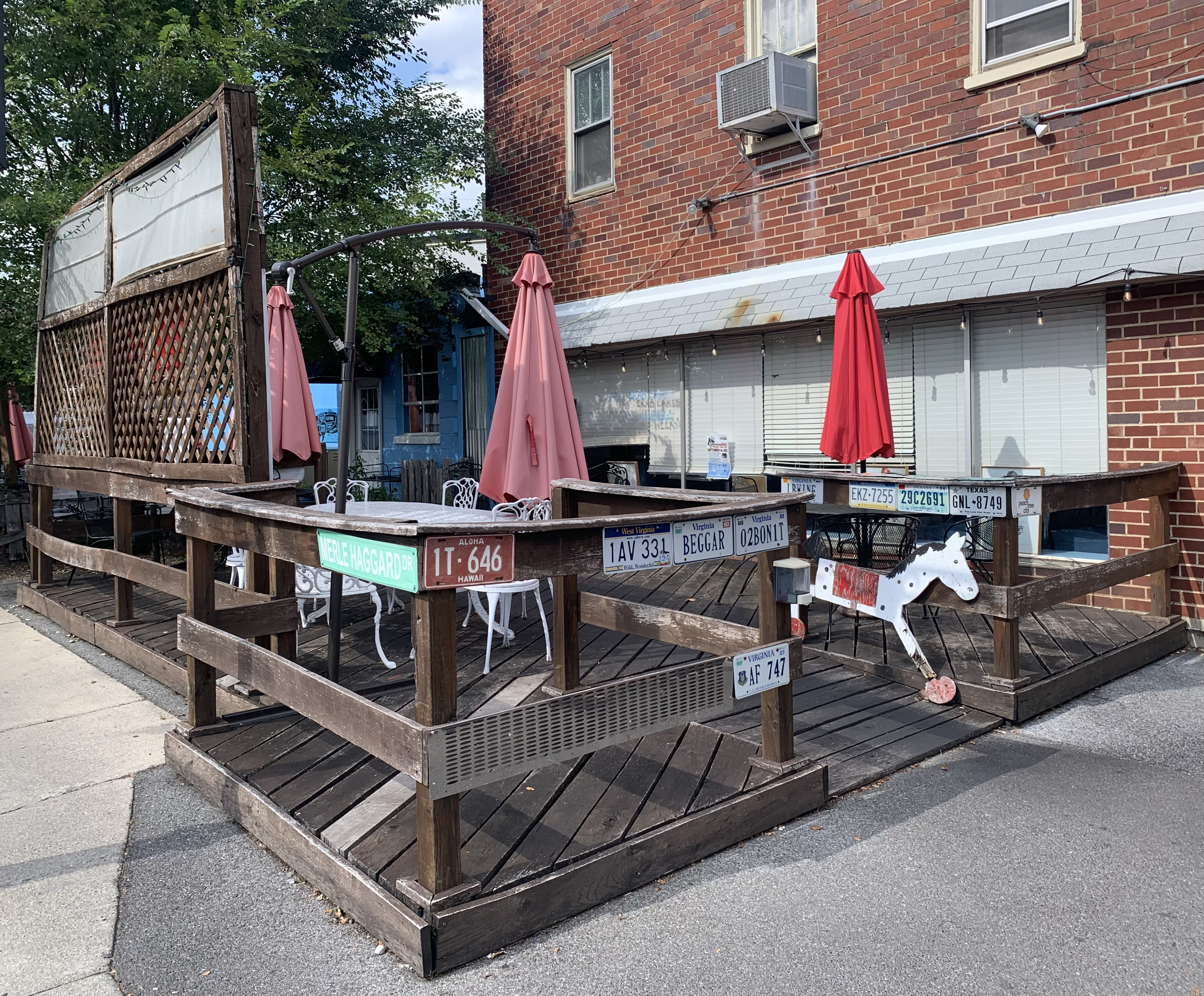
A portion of the outdoor seating at Bonnie Blue

During Bonnie Blue's first few years of operations, there was only seating for 20 people inside in addition to picnic tables outside. The total size of the restaurant, including kitchen and office space, was around 5,000 square feet (460 m^{2}). The smoker runs for around 20 hours each day, but it occasionally runs 24 hours. The restaurant's walls are decorated "with randomized paraphernalia, including political campaign signs, a quote from Willie Nelson painted near the ceiling, and a small wooden horse that one of the restaurant's owners stole from a beer festival in his youth." According to Schweiger, the restaurant's style is "casual Southern food and come as you are."

In 2013, Winchester's first Old Town Restaurant Week took place, with Bonnie Blue taking part. Later that year, the restaurant opened a cafe inside the Museum of the Shenandoah Valley, located a short distance away. Instead of a focus on barbecue, which was still offered, the cafe specialized in items such as sandwiches, soups, and salads. By 2014 the restaurant was co-owned by three people: Schweiger, Pellatt, and Stephen Pettler Jr. In November 2014, the restaurant's owners signed a lease for an adjoining property, 330 West Boscawen Street. After a $25,000 renovation was completed the following year, the new 1,500 square-foot (139 sq m) expansion added seating for 70 guests.

Bonnie Blue Concerts began hosting the Annual Patsy Cline Classic, a concert named after Winchester native Patsy Cline, a couple of years after the series began in 2009. Some of the musicians who have performed at the concert include Willie Nelson, Travis Tritt, Vince Gill, LeAnn Rimes, and The Beach Boys. In 2016, Bonnie Blue was one of two local restaurants to do well in the statewide Virginia is for Lovers Culinary Challenge. Bonnie Blue's apple pie bar won second place in the baked goods and dessert category.

In 2016, Brian Nichols wrote an article in The New York Times titled "13 Essential Barbecue Stops (and What to Order)". Nichols praised the pulled pork sandwich and beans at Bonnie Blue, and if someone ate breakfast there, he recommended the "stellar sausage gravy and even better grits". In another article titled "Before the Wedding, a Test: 3,000 Miles of Barbecue", Nichols said his visit to Bonnie Blue was part of a road trip with his fiancé. Following these articles, local and regional media, including DC News Now, reported on The New York Times story and noted Bonnie Blue had been visited by Kenny Rogers, Vince Gill, and Willie Nelson. According to Pellatt, Nichols and his fiancé ate a late breakfast, visited the nearby Museum of the Shenandoah Valley, and returned for a late lunch. He also said none of the employees knew a reporter was there that day.

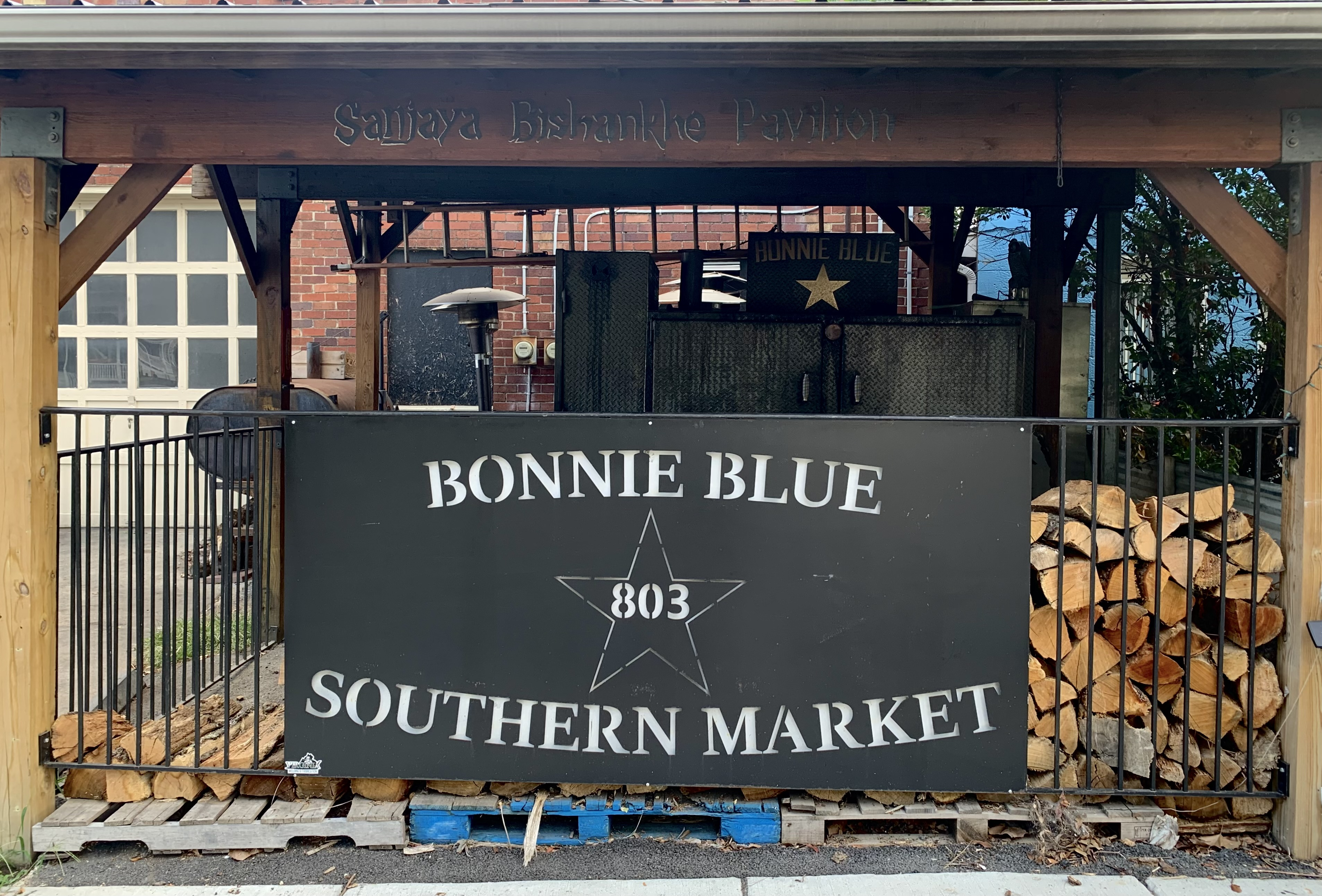
The barbecue pit at Bonnie Blue was named after former employee Sanjaya Bishankhe in 2017. (inscription seen at top)

The barbecue pit and a new 20-foot-by-20-foot (6-meters-by-6-meters) pavilion was named after former employee Sanjaya Bishankhe in 2017. Bishankhe, who had emigrated from Nepal in 2008, started working at Bonnie Blue in 2012 as a dishwasher. He was later promoted to cook and pitmaster and closely bonded with Pellatt. Bishankhe left Bonnie Blue in 2015 to become a restaurant general manager in the Outer Banks. The dedication took place on the one year anniversary of Bishankhe's receiving United States citizenship. In 2018, Bonnie Blue hosted Nancy Tabaka's first solo art show. A Winchester resident and Art Students League of New York alumnus, Tabaka's art show was the first time the restaurant had held such an event. The Taste of Winchester Food Festival took place in 2019 with Bonnie Blue being one of almost two dozen restaurants participating.

=== 2020s ===
During the 2020 COVID-19 pandemic, like most restaurants, Bonnie Blue was ordered to shut down indoor and outdoor seating. Food ordered to-go was still available, and in April, state officials begin allowing alcoholic drinks to also be ordered to-go. By June of that year, diners were able to eat on the patio with certain restrictions. In 2021, Bonnie Blue began utilizing community-supported agriculture (referred to as the CSA model), which allows consumers to purchase from a specific producer's harvest. The restaurant began purchasing its vegetables from a local farmer.

The following year, the regional chamber of commerce named Bonnie Blue as Small Business of the Year in the chamber's "Greater Good Awards". Bonnie Blue has often assisted many organizations and events by providing free food and labor. Those helped include: Healthy Families of Northern Shenandoah Valley, Congregational Community Action Project (CCAP) via the Hippie Fest Food Drive held at the restaurant and another event in which the restaurant fed low-income people from CCAP on Easter, the Winchester Free Medical Clinic, Aids Response Effort (ARE), Sinclair Health Clinic, Concern Hotline, Heroes on the River veterans' nonprofit, Shenandoah University's Hornets men's basketball team, victims of the April 2015 Nepal earthquake, and the North End Summer Kickoff hosted by the local NAACP chapter.

== Reception ==
Bonnie Blue has been covered positively by journalists and media organizations, including the 2016 article in The New York Times, and by The Washington Post on several occasions. In 2013, Bonnie Blue was listed as one of the restaurants to visit if one is taking a getaway trip to Winchester. Recommended items mentioned included the catfish, shrimp and grits, biscuits, and various sides and desserts. The following year reporter Holley Simmons wrote the article "Road trip inspiration: Bonnie Blue Southern Market and Bakery in Winchester, Va.". She praised the dessert items and noted the coffee was from a local vendor, Hopscotch Coffee Roasters. In 2015, Simmons, joined by reporters Sadie Dingfelder and Kristen Page-Kirby, once again included Bonnie Blue in a list of places to visit in Winchester. In 2018, Sheryl Nance-Nash writing in the New York Amsterdam News described Bonnie Blue as having "a locally sourced menu in a funky setting."

Washingtonian magazine encouraged its readers to visit towns in the Shenandoah Valley, and while discussing Winchester and places to eat, Bonnie Blue and its "Dixie Pig-a pulled-pork-stuffed baked potato" was mentioned. Local newspapers have positively reviewed or mentioned Bonnie Blue on many occasions. The Northern Virginia Daily in 2018 described the restaurant as being "known for its Janis Joplin posters, Texas-style barbecue, and made-from-scratch cakes, visitors flock to the 1920s restored Esso station for local and fresh foods." The restaurant's chef, Brian Pellatt, also shared a recipe for pork belly.

== Historic designation ==
The Winchester Historic District, which was first added to the Virginia Landmarks Register (VLR) in 1979 and the National Register of Historic Places (NRHP) in 1980, did not originally include the Bonnie Blue property. The VLR expanded the historic district on September 17, 2015, and the NRHP on January 5, 2016. This expansion covering 390 structures, including the Bonnie Blue restaurant and the adjoining buildings, designated them as contributing properties to the Winchester Historic District.

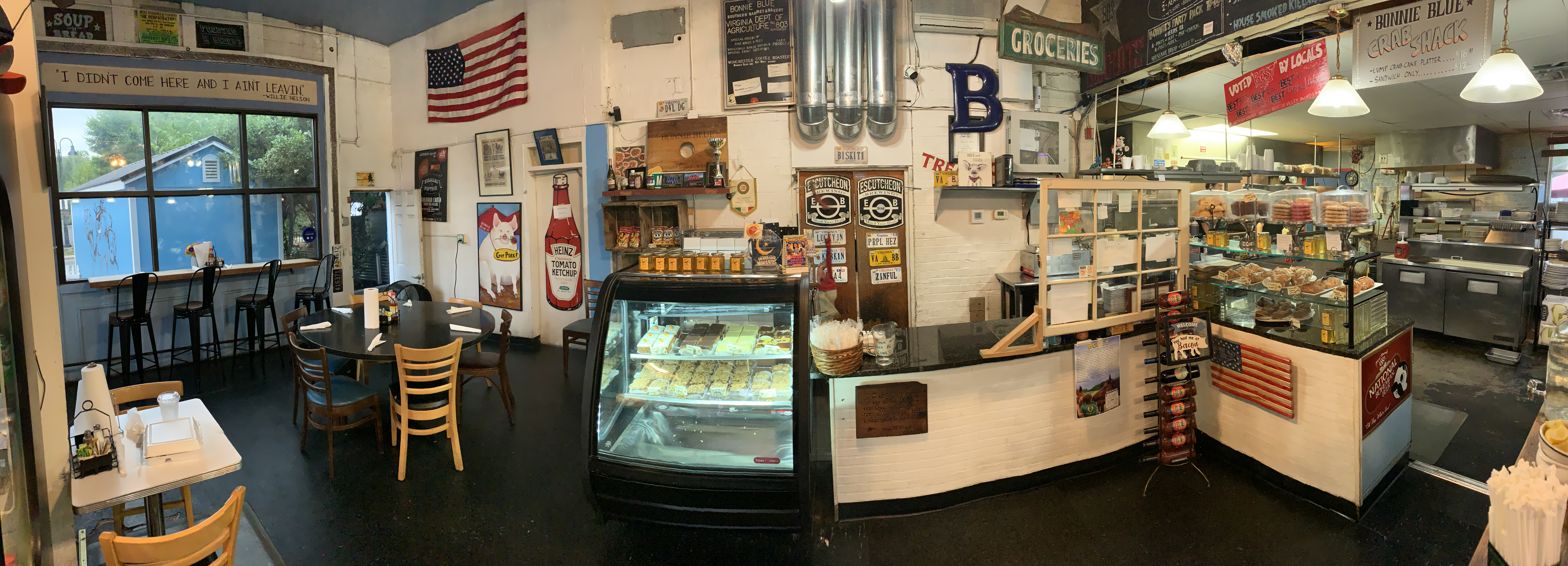
Panoramic of 1920 portion in 2023

== See also ==
- List of bakeries
- List of barbecue restaurants

== Notes ==
1. The National Register of Historic Places nomination form lists 334 West Boscawen Street being built in 1935 and the adjoining buildings in 1930. The City of Winchester's tax records list the same building constructed in 1920 and the adjoining buildings in 1945.
2. See note above.
