= Ford Model A (1927–1932) =

Compact car

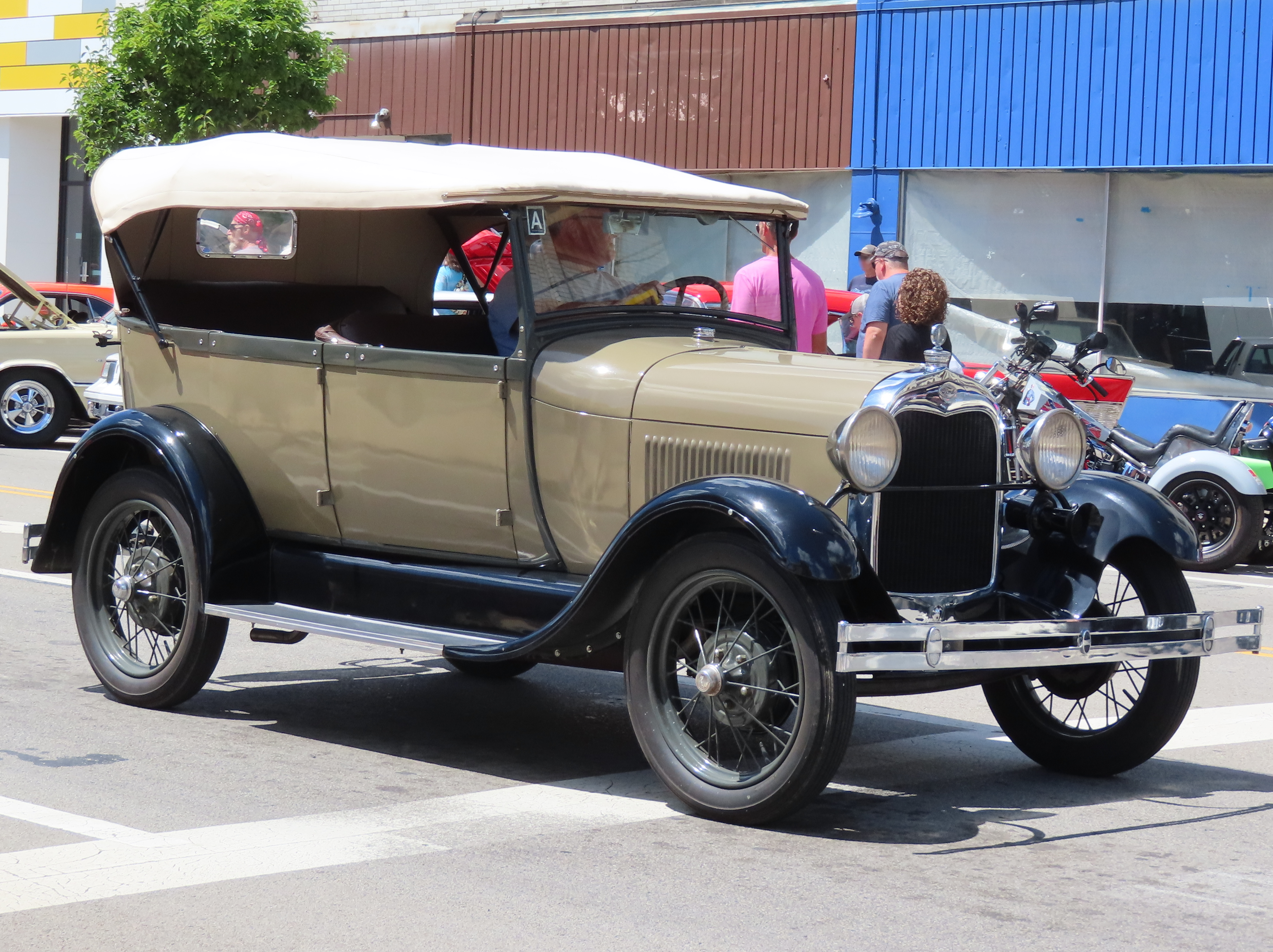
- 1928 Ford Model A phaeton

Overview
- Manufacturer: Ford Motor Company
- Also called: GAZ A (USSR)
- Production: October 1927 – March 1932
- Model years: 1928–1932
- Assembly: List: United States: Arabi, Louisiana; Buffalo, New York, Chester, Pennsylvania, Chicago, Illinois, Dallas, Texas, Denver, Colorado; Dearborn, Michigan; Jacksonville, Florida; Long Beach, California; Louisville, Kentucky; Norfolk, Virginia; Memphis, Tennessee; Richmond, California; Seattle, Washington; Somerville, Massachusetts; St. Louis, Missouri; Saint Paul, Minnesota; Argentina: Buenos Aires; Australia: Geelong, Victoria; Brazil: São Bernardo do Campo; Canada: Windsor, Ontario; Winnipeg, Manitoba; Chile: Santiago; Denmark: Copenhagen; France: Asnières-sur-Seine; Germany: Cologne; Ireland: Cork; Italy: Trieste; Japan: Yokohama; Mexico: Mexico City; South Africa: Port Elizabeth; Spain: Barcelona; Soviet Union: Nizhny Novgorod (GAZ-A); Turkey: Tophane, Istanbul; United Kingdom: Trafford Park
- Designer: Henry Ford; Edsel Ford

Body and chassis
- Class: Full-size Ford
- Body style: A – Chassis List: Convertible sedan (400A); Business coupe; Coupe; >Deluxe coupe; Special coupe (1928–1929 limited run); Sport coupe; Fordor coupe; >Deluxe coupe; Standard Fordor sedan – Murray; Standard Fordor sedan – Briggs; Deluxe Fordor sedan – Murray; Deluxe Fordor sedan – Briggs; >Leatherback Fordor sedan; Standard Fordor sedan – slant windshield; >Mail truck; Panel truck; Phaeton 2-door; Phaeton 4-door; Deluxe service pickup; Roadster pickup; Cabriolet; Pickup; Deluxe pickup; Standard roadster; Roadster utility; Deluxe roadster; Sport roadster; Station wagon; Taxi cab; Town car; Town car delivery; >Standard Tudor sedan; Deluxe Tudor sedan; Victoria; Wood panel delivery
- Layout: FR layout
- Platform: A Chassis
- Related: Ford Model AF; Ford Model AA; GAZ-A

Powertrain
- Engine: 201 CID (3.3 L) L-head I4
- Transmission: 3-speed sliding-mesh manual

Dimensions
- Wheelbase: 103.5 in (2,629 mm)
- Length: 165 in (4,191 mm)
- Width: 67 in (1,702 mm)
- Curb weight: 2,265–2,465 lb (1,027–1,118 kg)

Chronology
- Predecessor: Ford Model T
- Successor: Ford Model B; Ford Model 18

The Ford Model A (also colloquially called the A-Model Ford or the A, and A-bone among hot rodders and customizers) is a car that was produced by the Ford Motor Company as a replacement for the Model T which had been produced for 18 years. It was first produced on October 20, 1927, but not introduced until December 2. This new Model A (a previous model had used the name in 1903–04) was designated a 1928 model and was available in four standard colors.

By February 4, 1929, one million Model As had been sold, and by July 24, two million. The range of body styles ran from the Tudor at US$500 (in grey, green, or black) ($9,375 in 2025 dollars) to the town car with a dual cowl at US$1,200 ($22,500 in 2025 dollars). In March 1930, Model A sales hit three million, and there were nine body styles available.

Model A production ended in March 1932, after 4,858,644 had been made in all body styles. Its successor was the Model B, which featured an updated inline four-cylinder engine, as well as the Model 18, which introduced Ford's new flathead (sidevalve) V8 engine.

== Features ==
Prices for the Model A ranged from US$385 for a roadster to US$1,400 for the town car. The engine was a water-cooled L-head inline four with a displacement of 201 cu in (3.3 L). This engine provided 40 hp (30 kW; 41 PS).Top speed was around 65 mph (105 km/h). The Model A had a 103.5 in (2,630 mm) wheelbase with a final drive ratio of 3.77:1. The transmission was a conventional unsynchronized three-speed sliding-gear manual with a single-speed reverse. The Model A had four-wheel mechanical drum brakes.

The Model A came in a wide variety of styles including coupes (standard and deluxe), business coupe, sports coupe, roadster coupes (standard and deluxe), convertible cabriolet, convertible sedan, phaetons (standard and deluxe), Tudor sedans (standard and deluxe), town car, Fordors (five-window standard, three-window deluxe), Victoria, town sedan, station wagon, taxicab, truck, and commercial. The very rare special coupe started production around March 1928 and ended in mid-1929.

The Model A was the first Ford to use the standard set of driver controls with conventional clutch and brake pedals, throttle, and gearshift, although the brake and throttle pedal positions were reversed compared with modern cars. Previous Fords used controls that had become uncommon to drivers of other makes. The Model A's fuel tank was situated in the cowl, between the engine compartment's fire wall and the dash panel. It had a visual fuel gauge, and the fuel flowed to the carburetor by gravity. A rear-view mirror was optional. In cooler climates, owners could purchase an aftermarket cast iron unit to place over the exhaust manifold to provide heat to the cab. A small door provided adjustment of the amount of hot air entering the cab. The Model A was one of the first production cars to have safety glass in the windshield.

The Soviet company GAZ, which started as a joint venture between Ford and the Soviet Union, made a licensed version called GAZ-A, from 1932–1936.

In Europe, where in some countries cars were taxed according to engine size, Ford in the UK manufactured the Model A with a smaller displacement engine of 2,043 cc (124.7 cu in), providing a claimed output of 28 hp (21 kW; 28 PS). However, this equated to a British fiscal horsepower of 14.9 hp (11.1 kW; 15.1 PS) (compared to the 24 hp (18 kW; 24 PS) of the larger engine) and attracted a punitive annual car tax levy of £1 per fiscal hp in the UK. It, therefore, was expensive to own and too heavy and uneconomical to achieve volume sales, so it was unable to compete in the newly developing mass market while also too crude to compete as a luxury product. European manufactured Model As failed to achieve the sales success in Europe that would greet their smaller successor in Britain and Germany.

== Development history ==
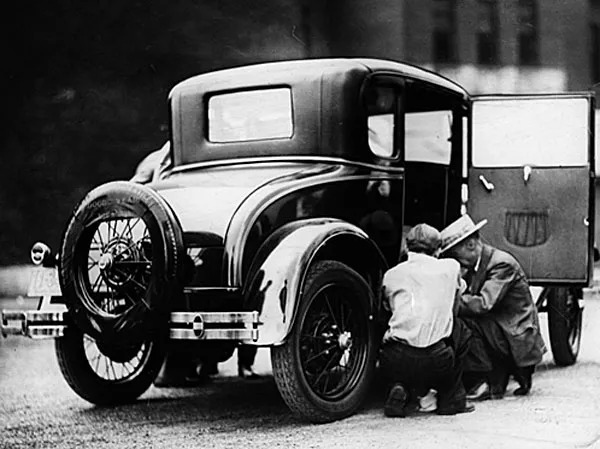
A Ford Model A photographed in 1929

From the mid-1910s through the early 1920s, Ford dominated the automotive market with its Model T. However, during the mid-1920s, this dominance eroded as competitors, especially the various General Motors divisions, caught up with Ford's mass production system and began to better Ford in some areas, especially by offering more powerful engines, new convenience features, or cosmetic customization.

Edsel Ford and Ford's sales force recognized the threat and advised Henry to respond to it. Initially, he resisted, but the T's sagging market share finally forced him to admit a replacement was needed. When he finally agreed to begin development of this new model, he focused on the mechanical aspects and on what today is called design for manufacturability (DFM), which he had always strongly embraced and for which the Model T production system was famous. Although ultimately successful, the development of the Model A included many problems that had to be resolved. For example, the die stamping of parts from sheet steel, which the Ford company had led to new heights of development with the Model T production system, was something Henry had always been ambivalent about; it had brought success, but he felt that it was not the best choice for durability. He was determined that the Model A would rely more on drop forgings than the Model T, but his ideas to improve the DFM of forging did not prove practical. Eventually, Ford's engineers persuaded him to relent, lest the Model A's production cost force up its retail price too much.

It was during the period from the mid-1920s to the early 1930s that the limits of the first generation of mass production, epitomized by the Model T production system's rigidity, became apparent. The era of "flexible mass production" had begun.

== Legacy ==
Several models have obtained particular fame. The Ramblin' Reck, a 1930 Sport Coupe, is the official mechanical mascot of the student body at the Georgia Institute of Technology and appears at numerous sporting events and student body functions. It has led the Tech football team out on to the field at every home game since 1961. The Mean Green Machine, a green 1929 Ford Model A Tudor sedan built in 1931, has been a staple of University of North Texas football games and special events since 1974, maintained by the spirit organization Talons since the 1980s. Ala Kart, a customized 1929 roadster pickup built by George Barris, won two straight "America's Most Beautiful Roadster" awards at the Oakland Roadster Show before making numerous film and television appearances. Between October 1992 and December 1994, Hector Quevedo, along with his son Hugo, drove a 1928 Model A 22,000 mi (35,406 km) from his home in Punta Arenas, Chile to Ford headquarters in Dearborn, Michigan. The car required minimal service, including a flat tire and transmission work in Nicaragua, and is now housed in the Henry Ford Museum. A 1930 Model A, used by the gangster John Dillinger to escape federal agents in 1934, was sold at auction in 2010 for $165,000.

Among the last Model A variants produced, the 1931 roadster attracted hot rod enthusiasts with its open cockpit, reduced weight compared to closed body styles, and straightforward but dependable chassis engineering.

== Jenny Railcars ==
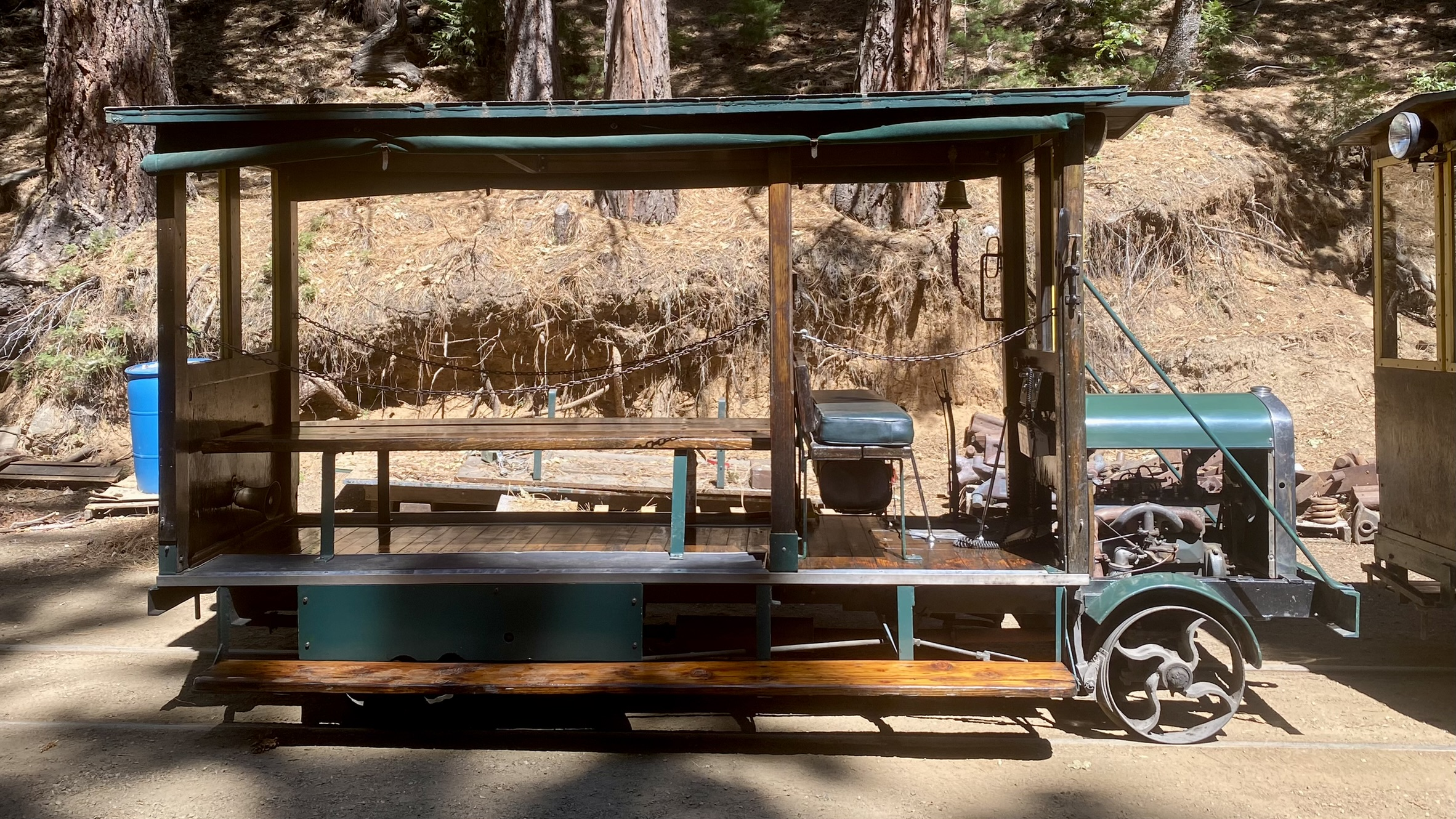
The Jenny railcar is a Ford Model A automobile converted for rail use.

The West Side Lumber Company of California converted several Model As into railcars which could carry 12 people. A few still see regular service on the Yosemite Mountain Sugar Pine Railroad, also in California, alongside Shays Nos. 10 and 15.

== Gallery ==
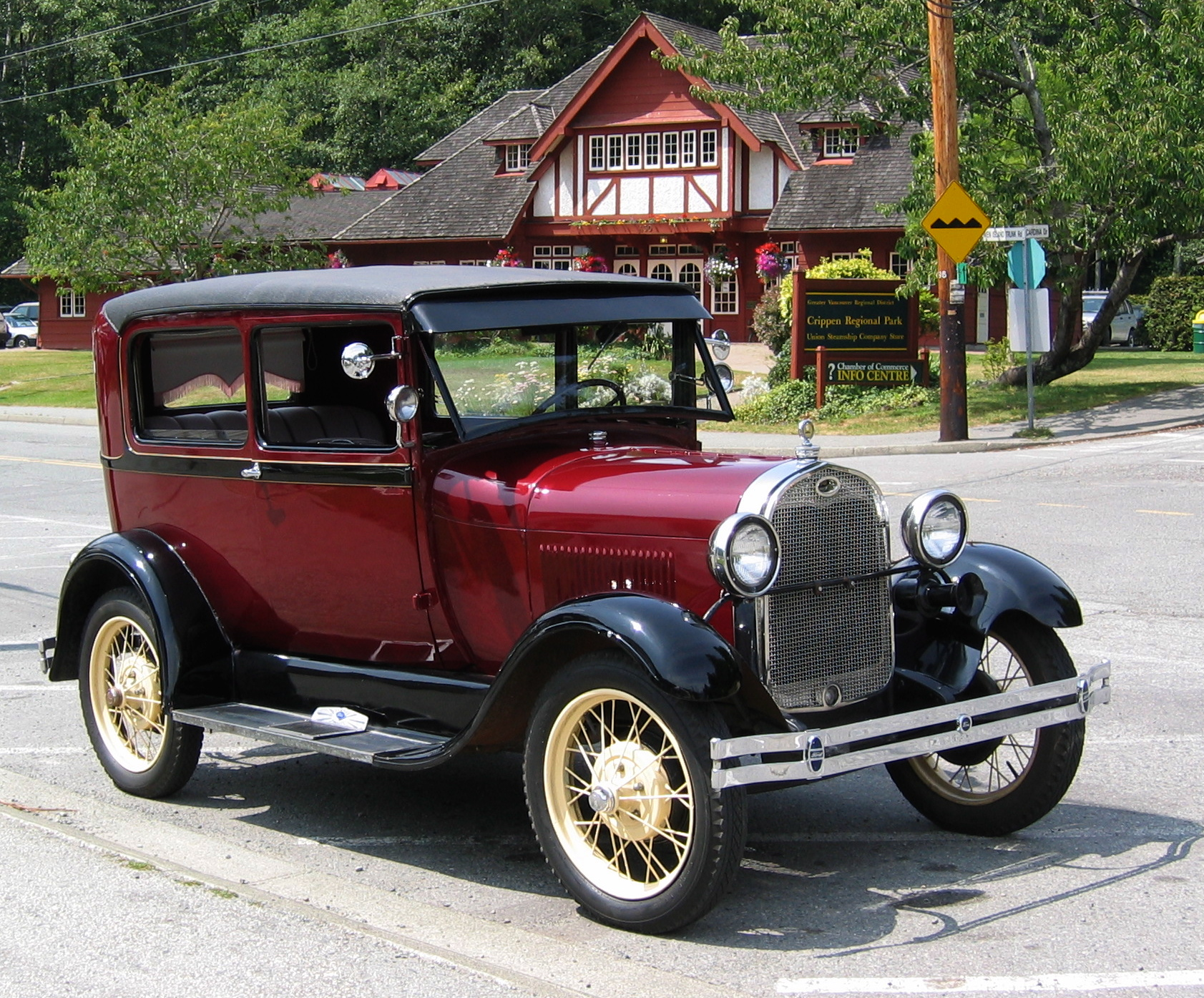
1928 Ford Model A Tudor sedan

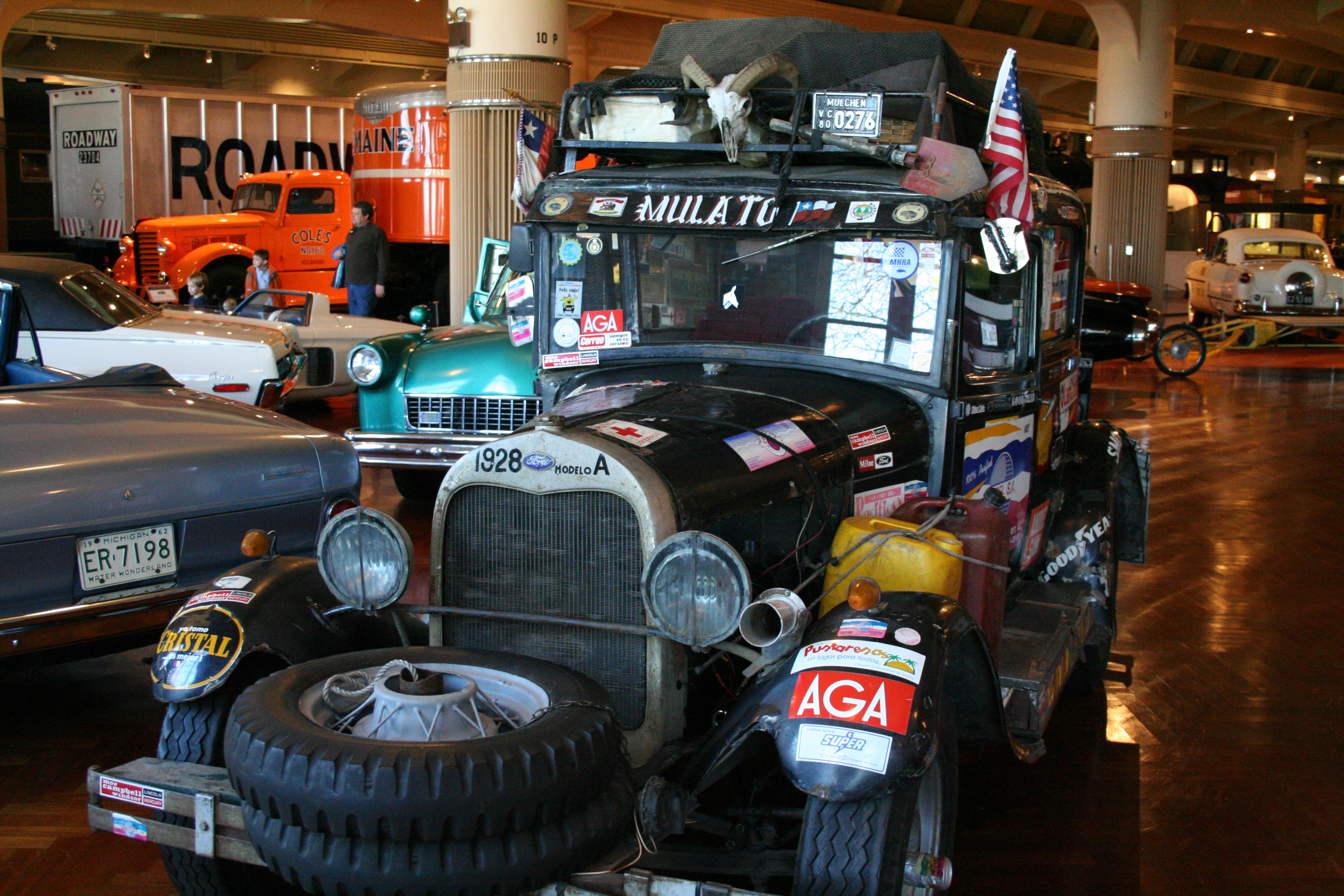
Hector Quevedo's 1928 Model A on display at the Henry Ford Museum

1928 Model A Fordor with a 1941 Kaiser wood gas generator

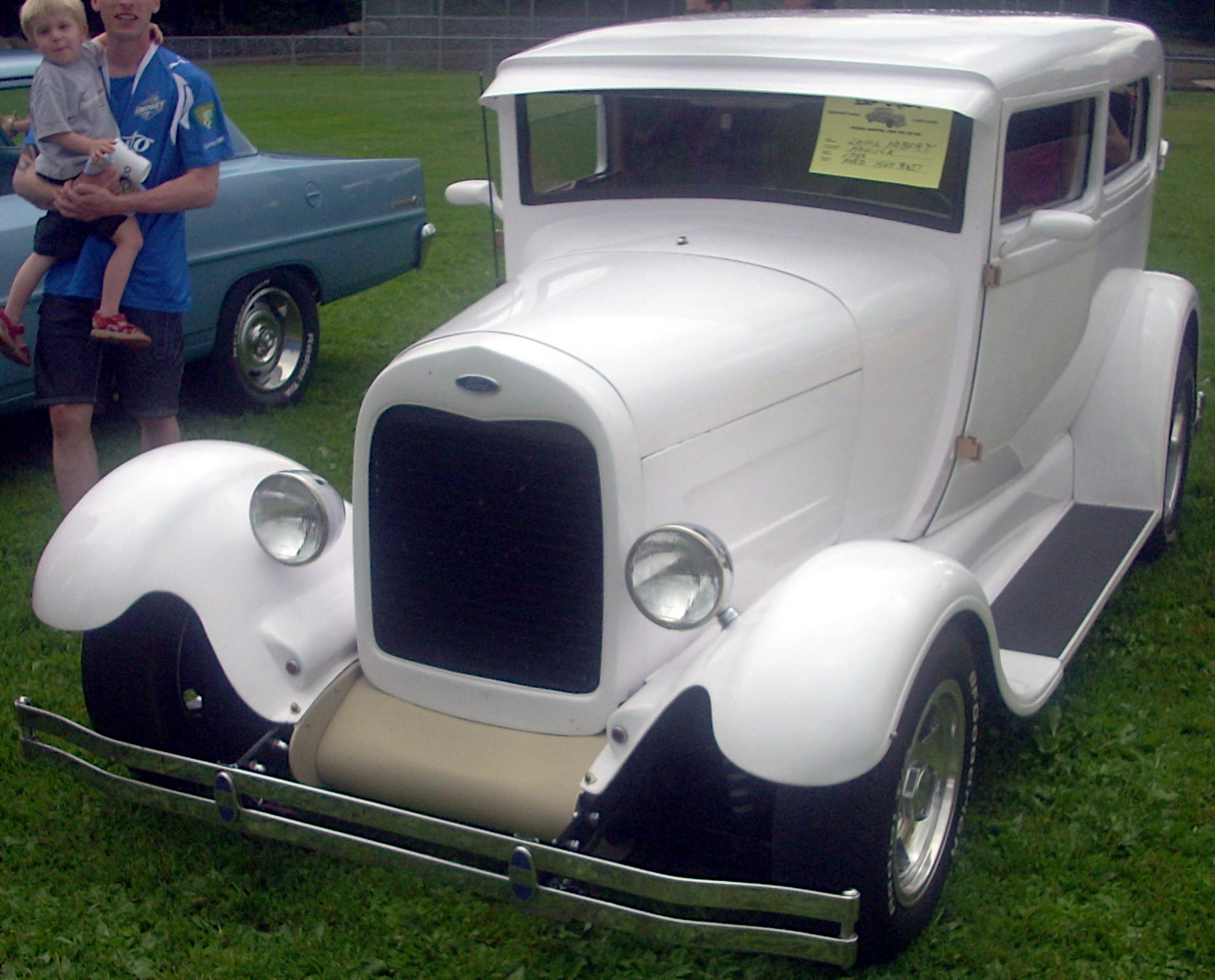
1928 Model A hot rod with roll pan, chopped top, and late-model headlights and mirrors

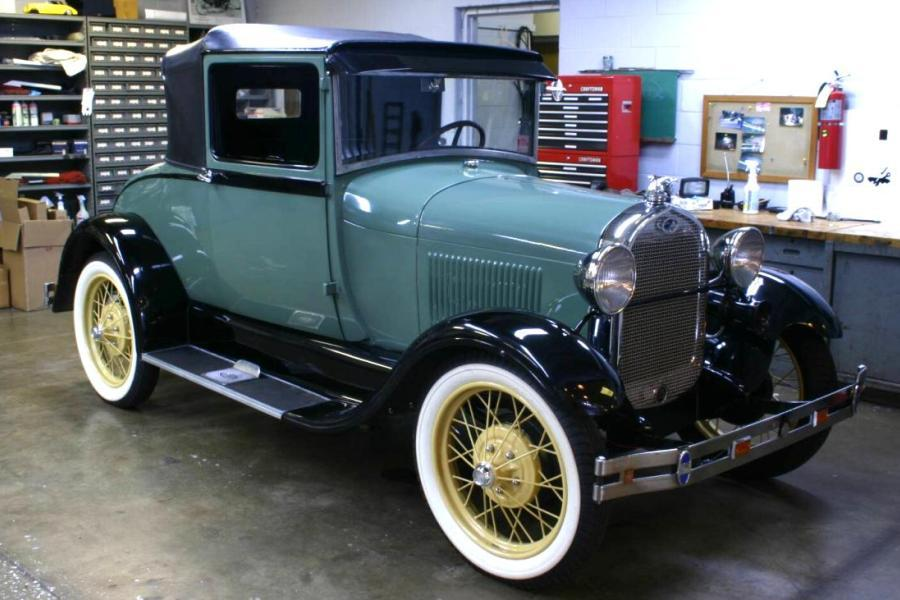
1928 Model A business coupe

1929 Model A Gazogene on display at the Tampa Bay Automobile Museum. This car was modified in 1939 to use an alternative fuel in the form of wood or charcoal.

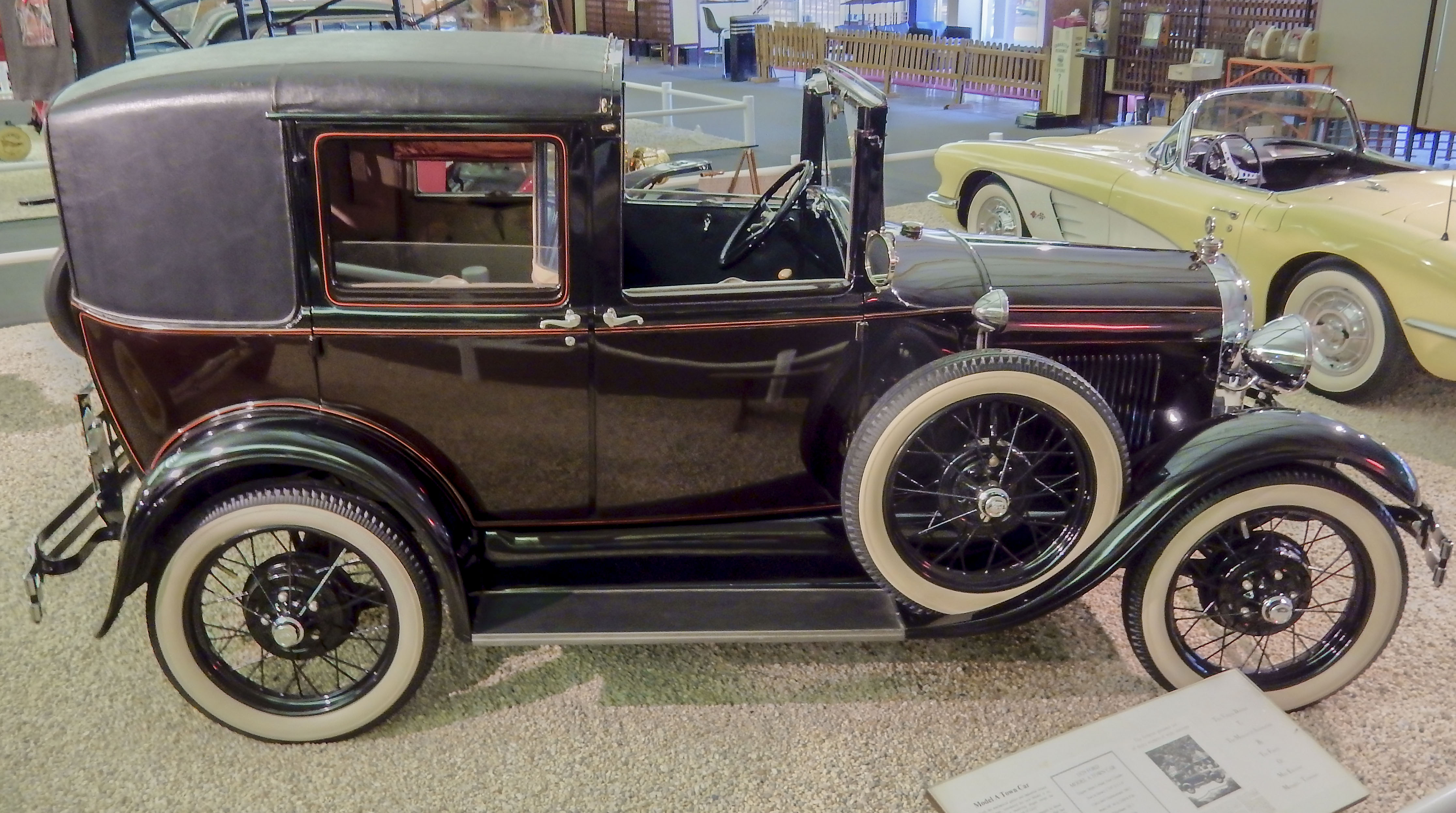
1929 town car from the Museum of Automobiles in Arkansas

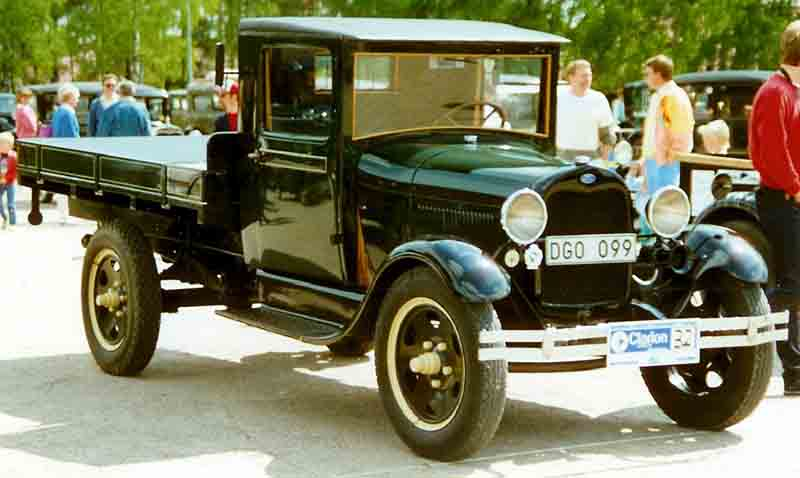
1929 Model AA heavy-duty truck variant of the Model A

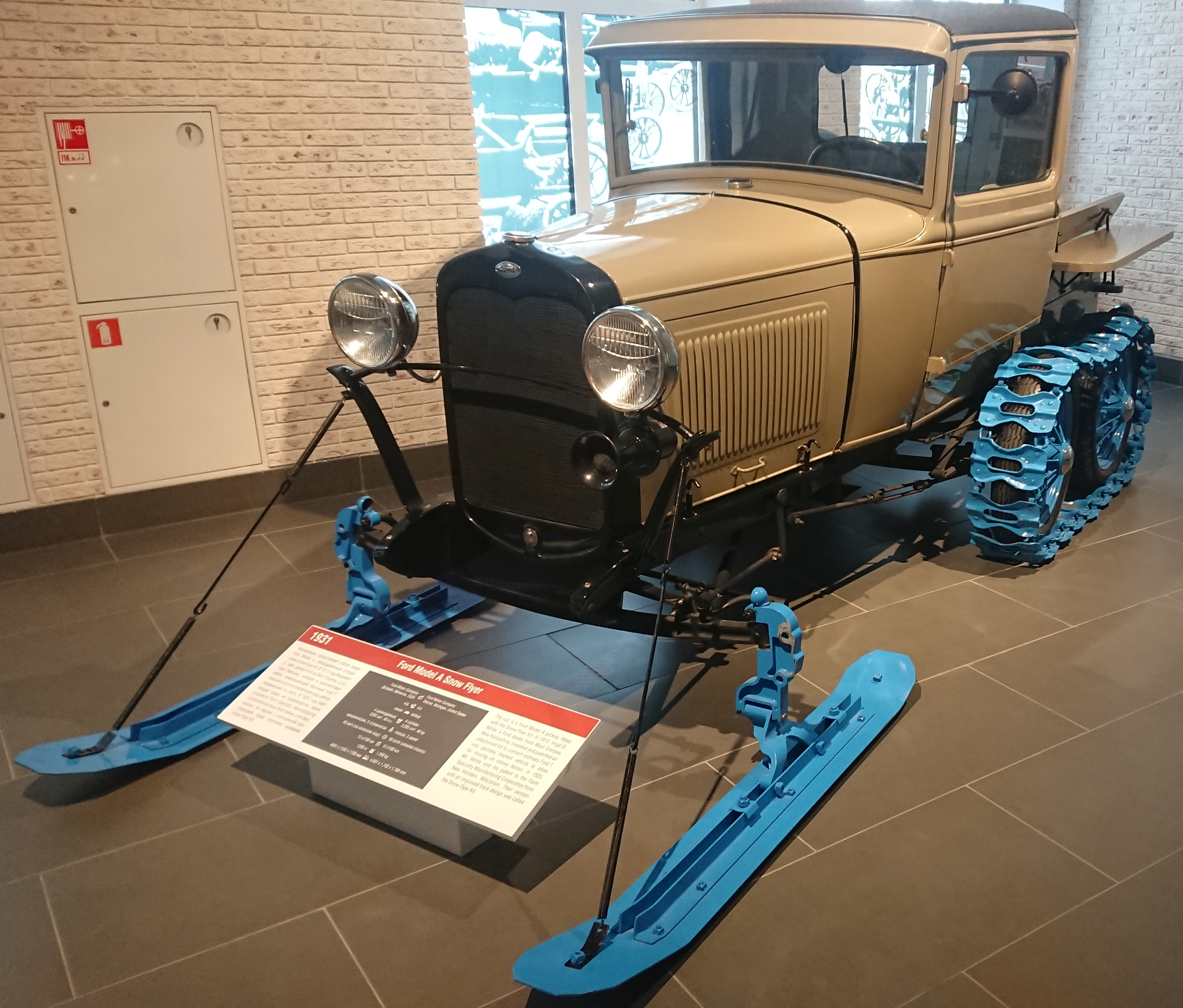
1931 Ford Model A, Snow Flyer

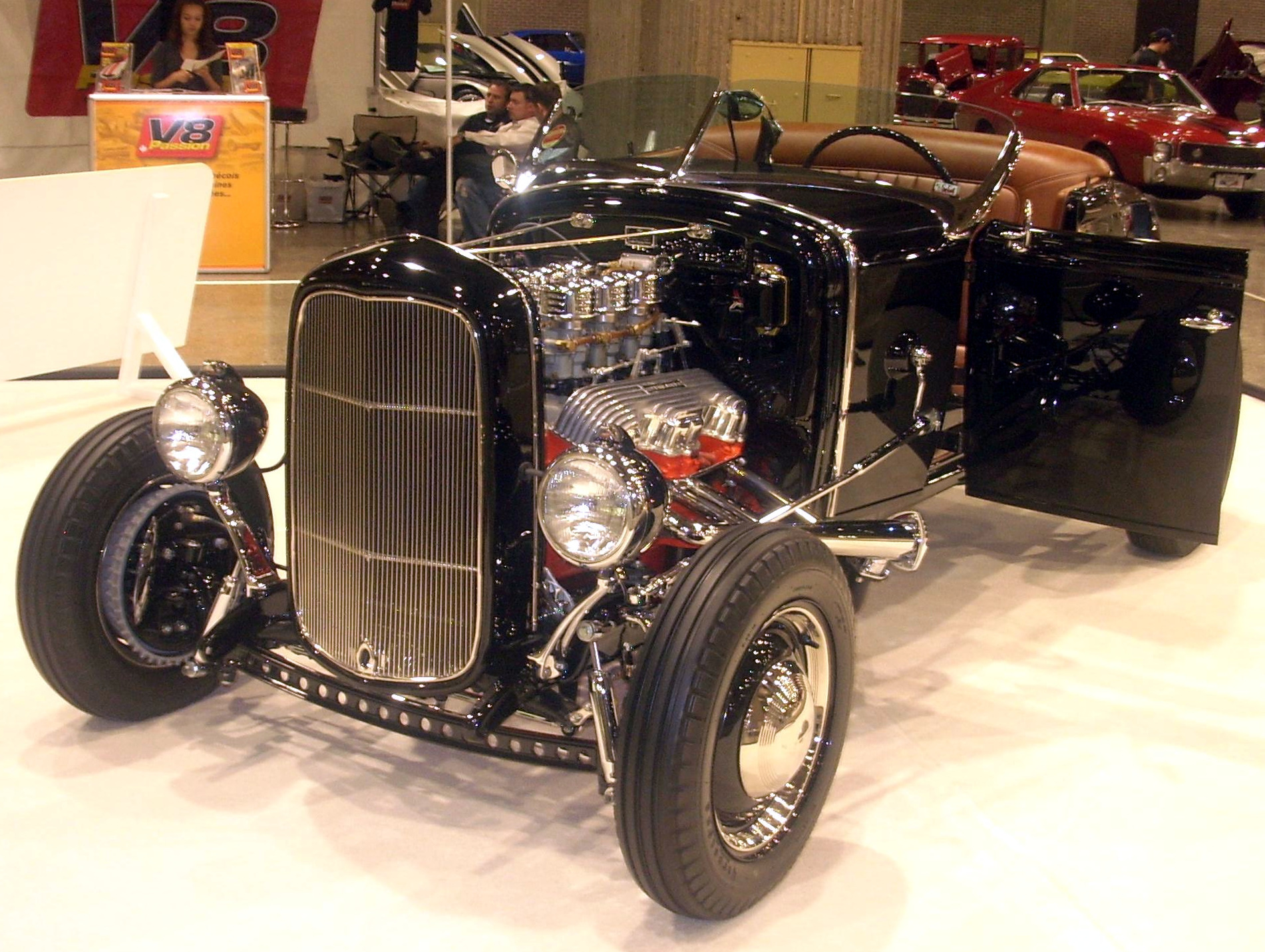
Hot rod with 1931 roadster body and chassis, Deuce grille shell, chrome-hatted carburetors, drilled I-beam dropped front axle, finned drum brakes, and lake pipes.
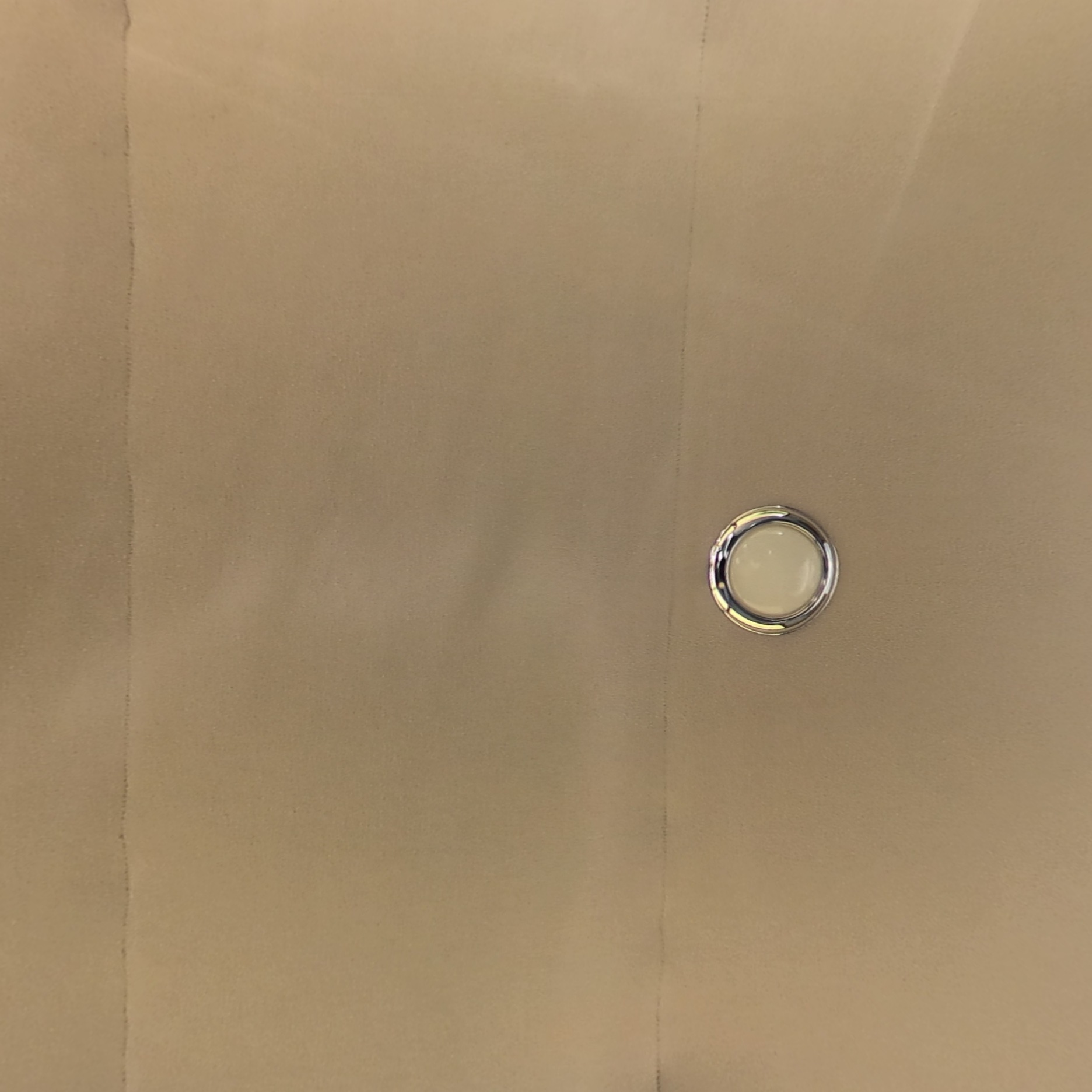
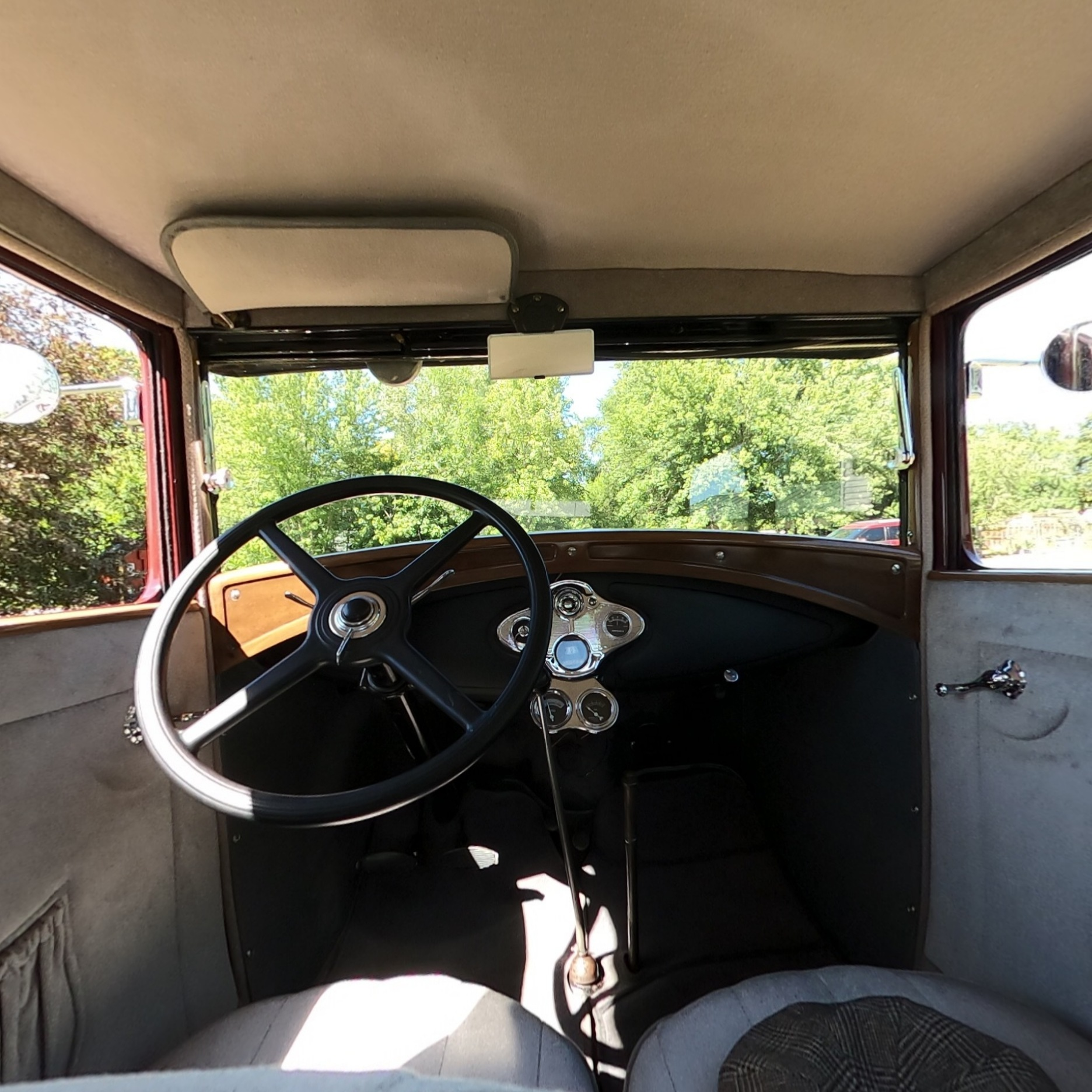
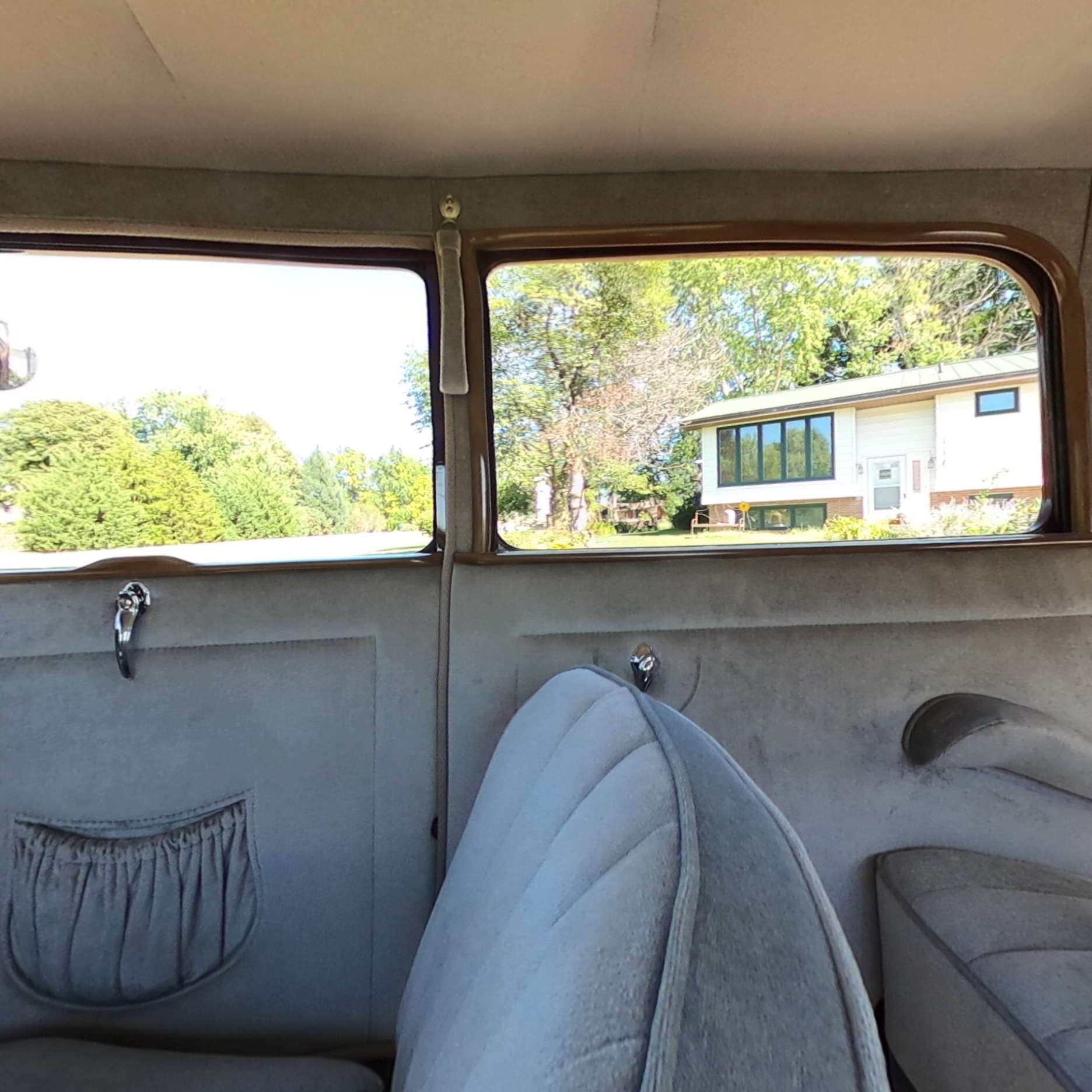
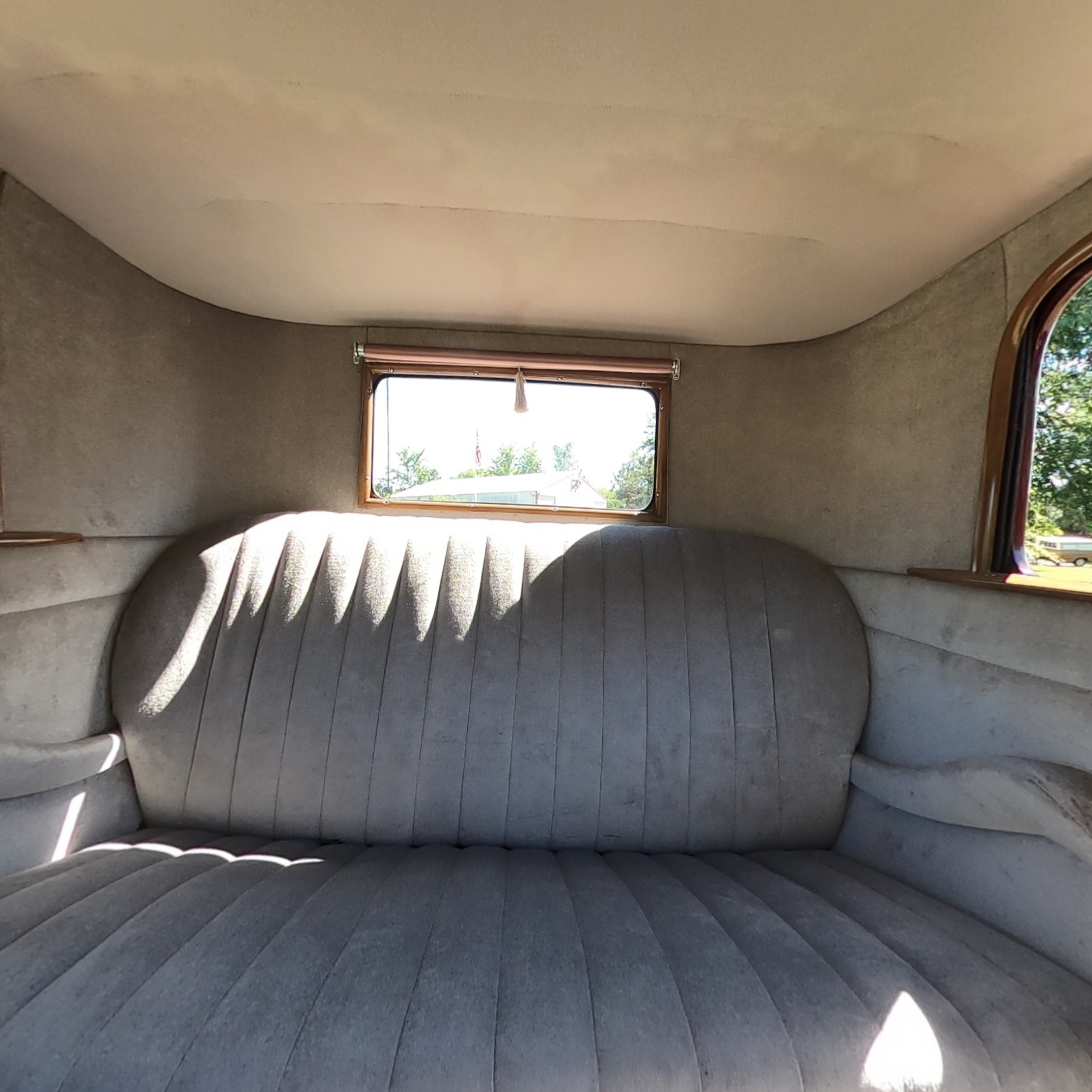
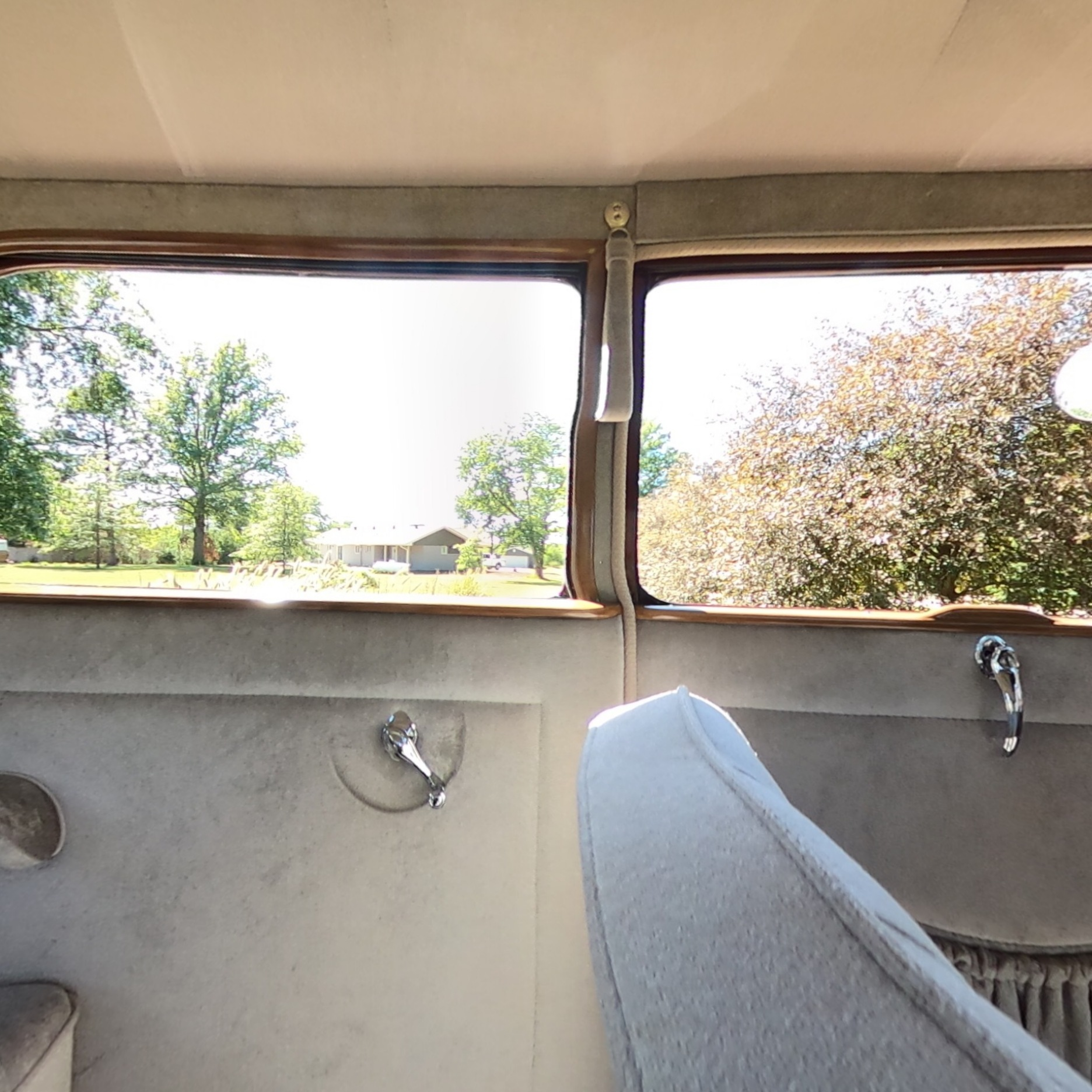
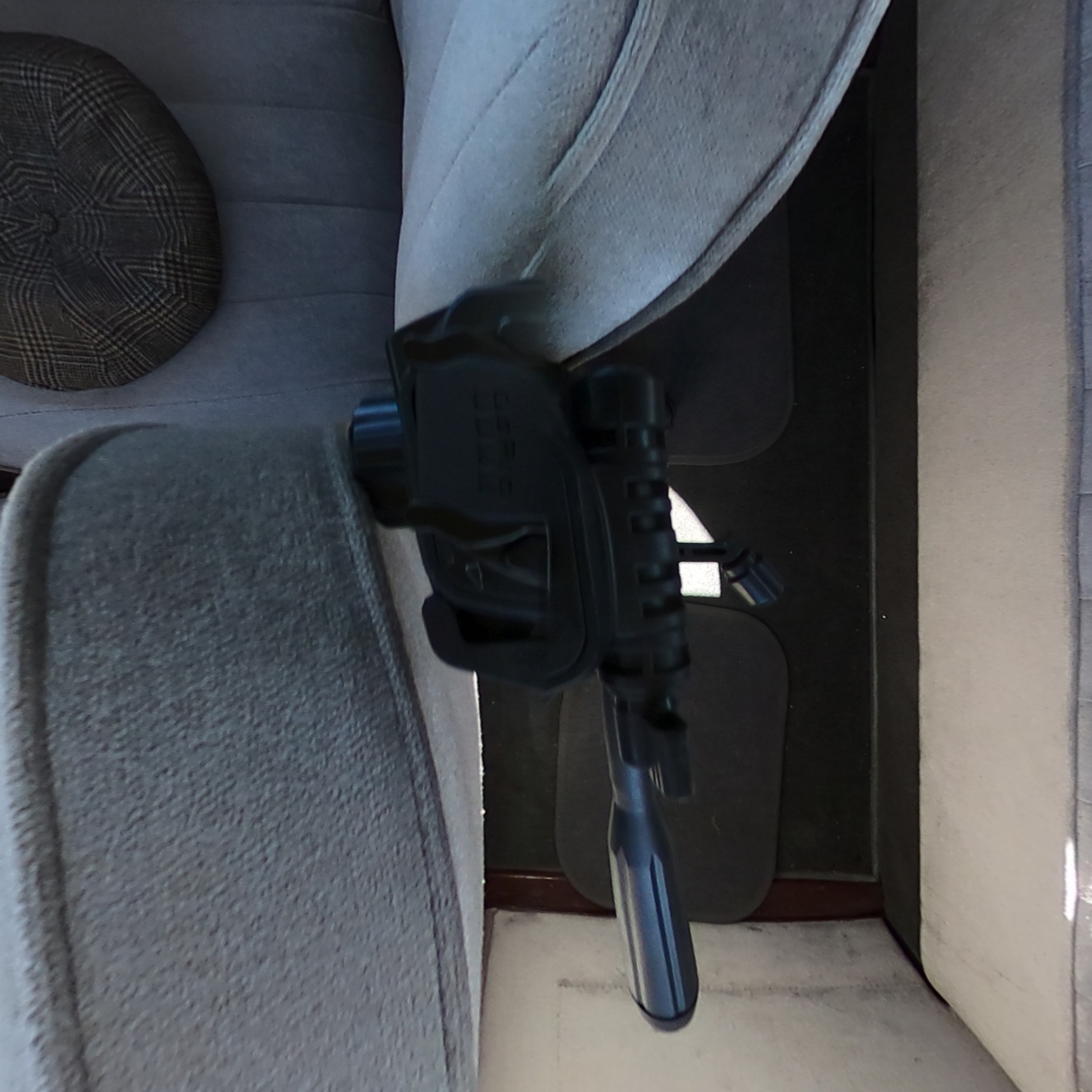
Interior view of a restored 1931 Model A.

== Bibliography ==
- Hounshell, David A. (1984), From the American System to Mass Production, 1800–1932: The Development of Manufacturing Technology in the United States, Baltimore, Maryland: Johns Hopkins University Press, ISBN 978-0-8018-2975-8, LCCN 83016269, OCLC 1104810110
- Sloan, Alfred P. (1964), McDonald, John (ed.), My Years with General Motors, Garden City, NY, US: Doubleday, LCCN 64011306, OCLC 802024. Republished in 1990 with a new introduction by Peter Drucker (ISBN 978-0385042352).
- Sorensen, Charles E. (1956), My Forty Years with Ford, New York: W. W. Norton, LCCN 56010854, OCLC 912748. Various republications, including ISBN 9780814332795.
- Gauld, Graham. "The Ford Motor Company", in Northey, Tom, ed. World of Automobile, Volume 6, pp. 681–700. London: Phoebus, 1974.
