= Webb Pierce =

American country musician (1921–1991)

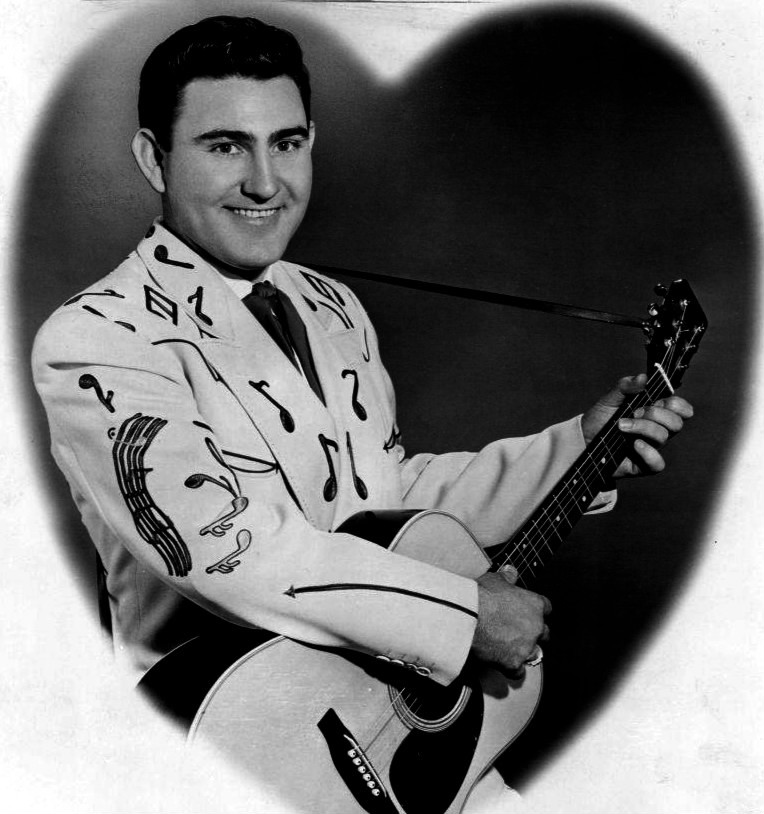
- Pierce circa 1957

Background information
- Born: Michael Webb Pierce; August 8, 1921; West Monroe, Louisiana, U.S.
- Died: February 24, 1991 (aged 69) Nashville, Tennessee, U.S.
- Genres: Country; honky-tonk; Western swing; country gospel; hillbilly
- Occupation: Singer-songwriter
- Instruments: Vocals; guitar
- Years active: 1936–1982
- Labels: 4 Star; Decca; MCA; Plantation

Michael Webb Pierce (August 8, 1921 – February 24, 1991) was an American country music vocalist, songwriter, and guitarist of the 1950s, one of the most popular of the genre, charting more number-one hits than any other country and western performer during the decade.

His biggest hit was the honky-tonk-rooted "In the Jailhouse Now", which charted for 37 weeks in 1955, 21 of them at number one. Pierce also charted number one for several weeks each with his recordings of "Slowly" (1954), "Love, Love, Love" (1955), "I Don't Care" (1955), "There Stands the Glass" (1953), "More and More" (1954), "I Ain't Never" (1959), and his first number one, "Wondering", which stayed at the top spot for four of its 27 weeks' charting in 1952.

For many, Pierce, with his flamboyant Nudie suits and twin silver dollar-lined convertibles, became the most recognizable face of country music of the era and its excesses. Pierce was a one-time member of the Grand Ole Opry and was posthumously inducted into the Country Music Hall of Fame. A tribute album in his honor (produced by singer-songwriter Gail Davies) was released in 2001 entitled Caught in the Webb – A Tribute to Country Legend Webb Pierce.

== Biography ==
Pierce was born in West Monroe, Louisiana. As a child, he was infatuated with Gene Autry films and his mother's hillbilly records, particularly those of Jimmie Rodgers and Western swing and Cajun groups. He began to play guitar before he was a teenager and at 15 was given his own weekly 15-minute show, Songs by Webb Pierce, on KMLB-AM in Monroe.

He enlisted in the US Army Air Forces, and in 1942, he married Betty Jane Lewis. After he was discharged, the couple moved to Shreveport, Louisiana, where Pierce worked in the men's department of a Sears & Roebuck store. In 1947, the couple appeared on KTBS-AM's morning show as "Webb Pierce with Betty Jane, the Singing Sweetheart". Pierce also performed at local engagements, developing his unique style that was once described as "a wailing whiskey-voiced tenor that rang out every drop of emotion."

=== Rise to fame ===
In 1949, California-based 4 Star Records signed the Webbs under separate contracts, with his wife signed for duets with her husband under the name Betty Jane and Her Boyfriends. However, success only came for Pierce, and in the summer of 1950, the couple divorced.

He moved to KWKH-AM and joined Louisiana Hayride during its first year, and devised a plan to achieve instant "stardom". Before the show, he bought tickets for several young girls in line and asked them to sit in the first row, and after each of his songs, to scream and beg for more. It worked; their enthusiasm spread throughout the audience.

Pierce assembled and performed with a band of local Shreveport musicians, including pianist Floyd Cramer, guitarist-vocalist Faron Young, bassist Tillman Franks, and vocalists Teddy and Doyle Wilburn. He also founded a record label, Pacemaker, and Ark-La-Tex Music, a publishing company, with Horace Logan, the director of the Hayride. On Pacemaker, Pierce made several records between 1950 and 1951 designed to attract radio play around Louisiana.

=== Shreveport to Nashville ===
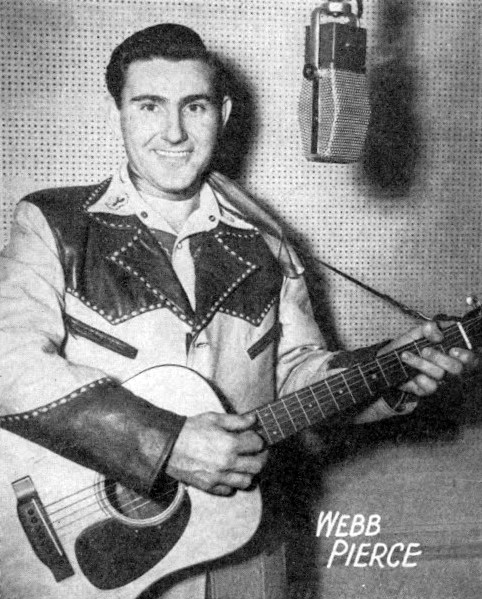
Pierce in 1955

In 1951, Pierce got out of his 4 Star contract and was quickly signed by Decca Records. His second single, "Wondering", became his breakthrough hit, climbing to number one early in 1952. Pierce moved to Nashville, Tennessee, where he met and married his second wife, Audrey Grisham. In June 1952, he had his second number-one single with "That Heart Belongs to Me".

In September 1952, the Grand Ole Opry needed to fill the vacancy left by the firing of Hank Williams, and Pierce was invited to join the cast. After Williams' death, he became the most popular singer in country music; for the next four years, every single he released hit the top 10, with 10 reaching number one, including "There Stands the Glass" (1953), "Slowly" (1954), "More and More" (1954) (a million seller), and "In the Jailhouse Now" (1955). His singles spent 113 weeks at number one during the 1950s, when he charted 48 singles. Thirty-nine reached the top 10, 26 reached the top four, and 13 hit number one.

His other hits included "Back Street Affair", "Why Baby Why", "Oh, So Many Years", and "Finally"; the latter two were duets with Kitty Wells. His 1954 recording of "Slowly" was the first successful single to include a pedal steel guitar. He made regular appearances on ABC-TV's Ozark Jubilee, including as a guest host once a month during 1956. In 1958, he recorded a rockabilly record, "The New Raunchy"/"I'll Get by Somehow" for Decca under the name Shady Wall.

On February 19, 1957, Pierce resigned from the Opry after he refused to pay commissions on bookings and for associated talent.

Pierce continued charting until 1982, with a total of 96 hits, and he toured extensively and appeared in the films Buffalo Gun, Music City USA, Second Fiddle to a Steel Guitar, and The Road to Nashville

=== Lavish lifestyle and later years ===
As his music faded from the spotlight, Pierce became known for his excessive lifestyle. He had North Hollywood tailor Nudie Cohen, who had made flamboyant suits for Pierce, line two convertibles with silver dollars. He built a $30,000 guitar-shaped swimming pool at his Nashville home, which became a popular paid tourist attraction – nearly 3,000 people visited it each week – causing his neighbors, led by singer Ray Stevens, to file suit and prevail against Pierce to end the tours.

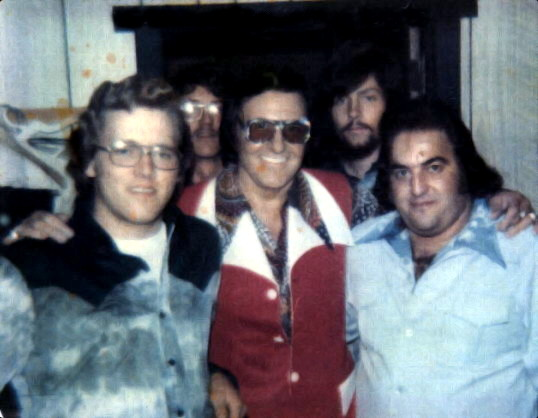
Webb Pierce (East Coast Tour with Jerry Galloway) backstage at the Cedarwood Log Cabin – Southern New Jersey, probably fall 1974

He remained with Decca and its successor, MCA, well into the 1970s, but by 1977, he was recording for Plantation Records. Though he had occasional minor hits, charting in a 1982 duet with Willie Nelson, a remake of "In the Jailhouse Now", he spent his final years tending to his businesses, and his legend became clouded due to his reputation as a hard drinker. Webb and his daughter Debbie recorded the ballad "On My Way Out" as the Pierces, and she was a member of the country group Chantilly in the early 1980s.

Pierce waged a long battle with pancreatic cancer, dying on February 24, 1991, and was buried in the Woodlawn Memorial Park in Nashville.

== Legacy ==
Pierce has a star on the Hollywood Walk of Fame at 1600 Vine Street. He was inducted, posthumously, into the Country Music Hall of Fame in October 2001 and into the Louisiana Music Hall of Fame in 2008.

Caught in the Webb–a Tribute to the Legendary Webb Pierce was released on Audium Records in 2001. Produced and arranged by singer-songwriter Gail Davies, this album features Willie Nelson, Crystal Gayle, George Jones, Emmylou Harris, the Del McCoury Band, Charley Pride, Allison Moorer, Dwight Yoakam, Pam Tillis, Dale Watson, the Jordanaires, Gail Davies, and others. Gail Davies herself first charted in 1978 with "No Love Have I", a number-26 Billboard Country hit that Pierce had recorded (and taken to number four) in 1959. Proceeds from this album were to benefit the Minnie Pearl Cancer Foundation.

Footage of Pierce singing "There Stands the Glass" was featured in the 2005 documentary No Direction Home by Martin Scorsese about early influences on Bob Dylan. Pierce's hit single "More and More" was played in the title credits of the 2006 horror film The Hills Have Eyes.

== Discography ==
=== Albums ===
Year	Album	US Country	Label	Cat No	EAN / UPC	Notes
1955	Webb Pierce		Decca			
1956	The Wondering Boy		Decca			
1957	Just Imagination		Decca			
1959	Bound for the Kingdom		Decca			
1959	Webb!		Decca			
1960	Webb with a Beat		Decca			
1960	Walking the Streets		Decca			
1961	Webb Pierce's Golden Favorites		Decca			
1961	Fallen Angel		Decca			
1962	Hideaway Heart		Decca			
1963	Cross Country	20	Decca			
1963	I've Got a New Heartache		Decca			
1963	Bow Thy Head		Decca			
1964	The Webb Pierce Story	13	Decca			
1964	Sands of Gold		Decca			
1965	Memory No. 1	6	Decca			
1965	Country Music Time		Decca			
1966	Sweet Memories		Decca			
1966	Webb's Choice	29	Decca			
1967	Where'd Ya Stay Last Night	43	Decca			
1968	Fool Fool Fool		Decca			
1968	Saturday Night		Decca			
1969	Webb Pierce Sings This Thing	32	Decca			
1970	Love Ain't Never Gonna Be No Better	42	Decca			
1970	Merry Go Round World		Decca			
1971	Road Show		Decca			
1972	I'm Gonna Be a Swinger		Decca			
1979	Faith, Hope and Love		Skylite			
1982	In the Jailhouse Now (w/ Willie Nelson)		Columbia			
1990	The Wondering Boy 1951–1958		Bear Family Records	BCD15522	4000127155221	4-CD boxed set
1994	The Unavailable Sides 1950–1951		Krazy Kat	KKCD16	0008637601621	

=== Singles ===
Year	Single	Chart Positions				
Year	Single	US Country	US CB Country	US CB	US	CAN Country
1951	"Wondering"	1				
1952	"That Heart Belongs to Me"	1				
1952	"Back Street Affair"	1				
1953	"I'll Go On Alone"	4				
1953	"That's Me Without You"	4				
1953	"The Last Waltz"	4				
1953	"I Haven't Got the Heart"	5				
1953	"It's Been So Long"	1				
1953	"Don't Throw Your Life Away"	9				
1953	"There Stands the Glass"	1				
1953	"I'm Walking the Dog"	3				
1954	"Slowly"	1				
1954	"Even Tho"	1				
1954	"Sparkling Brown Eyes" (w/ The Wilburn Brothers)	4				
1954	"More and More"	1			22	
1954	"You're Not Mine Anymore"	4				
1955	"In the Jailhouse Now"	1				
1955	"I'm Gonna Fall Out of Love with You"	10				
1955	"I Don't Care"	1				
1955	"Your Good for Nothing Heart"	flip				
1955	"Love, Love, Love"	1				
1955	"If You Were Me"	7				
1956	"Why Baby Why" (w/ Red Sovine)	1				
1956	"Yes I Know Why"	2				
1956	"'Cause I Love You"	3				
1956	"Little Rosa" (w/ Red Sovine)	5				
1956	"Any Old Time"	7				
1956	"We'll Find a Way"					
1956	"Teenage Boogie"	10				
1956	"I'm Really Glad You Hurt Me"	flip				
1957	"I'm Tired"	3				
1957	"It's My Way"	flip				
1957	"Honky Tonk Song"	1				
1957	"Oh So Many Years" (w/ Kitty Wells)	8				
1957	"Someday"	12				
1957	"Bye Bye Love"	7			73	
1957	"Missing You"	7				
1957	"Holiday for Love"	3	18			
1957	"Don't Do It Darlin'"	12				
1958	"One Week Later" (w/ Kitty Wells)	12				
1958	"Cryin' Over You"	3	7			
1958	"You'll Come Back"	10	33			
1958	"Falling Back to You"	10	10			
1958	"Tupelo County Jail"	7	6			
1959	"I'm Letting You Go"	22	31			
1959	"Sittin' Alone"		34			
1959	"A Thousand Miles Ago"	6	3			
1959	"What Goes On In Your Heart"		49			
1959	"I Ain't Never"	2	1	25	24	
1959	"Shanghied"		17			
1960	"No Love Have I"	4	4	60	54	
1960	"(Doin' the) Lovers Leap"	17	9	tag	93	
1960	"Is It Wrong (For Loving You)"	11	15	117	69	
1960	"Drifting Texas Sand"	11	9		108	
1960	"All I Need Is You"		29			
1960	"Fallen Angel"	4	3		99	
1961	"Let Forgiveness In"	5	5			
1961	"There's More Pretty Girls Than One"		44		118	
1961	"Sweet Lips"	3	2			
1961	"Last Night"		32			
1961	"Walking the Streets"	5	3			
1961	"How Do You Talk to a Baby"	7	6			
1962	"Alla My Love"	5	3			
1962	"You Are My Life"		15			
1962	"Crazy Wild Desire"	8	3			
1962	"Take Time"	7	6			
1962	"Cow Town"	5	3			
1962	"Sooner or Later"	19	11			
1963	"How Come Your Dog Don't Bite Nobody But Me" (w/ Mel Tillis)	25	12			
1963	"Sawmill"	15	5			
1963	"If I Could Come Back"	21	5			
1963	"Sands of Gold"	7	4	117	118	
1963	"Nobody's Darlin' But Mine"		5	147		
1963	"If the Back Door Could Talk"	13	7			
1963	"Those Wonderful Years"	9	8			
1964	"Waiting a Lifetime"	25	28			
1964	"Memory No. 1"	2	1			
1964	"French Riviera"		29		126	
1964	"Finally" (w/ Kitty Wells)	9	7			2
1964	"He Made You For Me" (w/ Kitty Wells)		44			
1965	"That's Where My Money Goes"	26	11			
1965	"Broken Engagement"	46	40			
1965	"Loving You Then Losing You"	22	32			
1965	"Who Do I Think I Am"	13	28			
1965	"Hobo and the Rose"	50	25			
1965	"Sweet Memories"		13			
1966	"You Ain't No Better Than Me"	46	55			
1966	"Love's Something (I Can't Understand)"	25	31			
1966	"A Loner"		60			
1966	"Where'd Ya Stay Last Night"	14	14			
1967	"Goodbye City, Goodbye Girl"	39	40			
1967	"Fool Fool Fool"	6	3			5
1968	"Luzianna"	24	19			7
1968	"Stranger in a Strange, Strange City"	26	31			
1968	"In Another World"	74				
1968	"Saturday Night"	22	25			25
1969	"If I Had Last Night to Live Over"	32	20			
1969	"This Thing"	14	17			17
1969	"Love Ain't Gonna Be No Better"	38	52			
1970	"Merry-Go-Round World"	71	65			
1970	"The Man You Want Me to Be"	56	36			
1971	"Showing His Dollar"	73				
1971	"Tell Him That You Love Him"	31	21			
1971	"Someone Stepped In (And Stole Me Blind)"	73	62			
1972	"Wonderful, Wonderful, Wonderful"					21
1972	"I'm Gonna Be a Swinger"	54	65			
1975	"The Good Lord Giveth (And Uncle Sam Taketh Away)"	57	32			
1976	"I've Got Leaving on My Mind"	82	59			41
1982	"In the Jailhouse Now" (w/ Willie Nelson)	72	54			

=== Guest singles ===
Year	Single	Artist	US Country
1985	"One Big Family"	Heart of Nashville	61
