= Wondering (Webb Pierce song) =

Single by Webb Pierce
- B-side: "That Heart Belongs to Me"
- Released: 1951
- Recorded: 1951
- Genre: Country and western
- Length: 2:55
- Label: Decca
- Songwriter(s): Joe Werner

Webb Pierce singles chronology
"Wondering" (1951)	"That Heart Belongs to Me" (1952)

"Wondering" is a 1930s song written by Joe Werner and originally recorded by the Riverside Ramblers. It is best known for the version recorded by Webb Pierce in 1951. It was Pierce's first number one on the Billboard country and western charts, topping the Country & Western Records Most Played by Folk Disk Jockeys chart for four weeks.

== Charts ==
Chart (1952)	Peak position
Most-Played Juke Box (Country & Western) Records	4
Best-Selling Retail Folk (Country & Western) Records	4
Country & Western Records Most Played by Folk Disk Jockeys	1
