= Joe Werner =

- Born: Joseph Edward Werner; September 20, 1909; Rayne, Louisiana
- Died: June 10, 1975 (aged 65) Ft. Worth, Texas
- Genres: Cajun, country music, Western string band
- Occupations: Musician, entertainer
- Instruments: guitar, harmonica, vocals, whistling
- Labels: Bluebird, Decca
- Formerly of: Riverside Ramblers

Joseph Edward Werner (September 20, 1909, Rayne, Louisiana – June 10, 1978, Ft. Worth, Texas) was a Cajun musician most remembered for his tune "Wondering" made famous by Webb Pierce. He played for many years with the group Hackberry Ramblers as they were known as Riverside Ramblers as well as in several Cajun groups of his own. Although his career spanned only two years, 1937 and 1938, his French and English tunes influenced many Cajun musicians in Louisiana for years.

== Early life ==
Joe was exposed to music in his early life having many musicians in his family. His parents, Max and Martha Werner with both German immigrants, with Max being a veteran of the Spanish–American War. He recalled when he was a barefooted kid, he told his father before Christmas that he wanted Santa Claus to bring him a harmonica. He got his harmonica and he started "fooling" with music. Year after year, the Christmas request was the same, and year after year, Santa Claus came through with another harmonica. Throughout his school years, he performed on stage as both a vaudeville black face actor in minstrel shows and as a whistling, guitar playing, singing musician. At some point in the early 30s, he moved to Crowley, Louisiana where he participated in talent competitions in the city, even travelling to Chicago with fellow actor and entertainer, S.L. Ross.

== String band era ==
In 1935, the Hackberry Ramblers began recording music for RCA Victor records on their budget Bluebird Records label. Joe got married in 1936 and late that year, he began playing with the band. In 1937, the group was invited to record in New Orleans for a session where several English tunes were sung under the band name "Riverside Ramblers". Joe sang and played a tune he claimed he learned from a travelling hobo called "Wondering". According to Joe:

It was back in my courtin' days. One day I sat down and started picking away at the guitar and playing the harmonica and the tune fell together. I worked out the words the same way. It was in Paco's Cafe over in Rayne. I had the song and words before I left Paco's that night.

— Joe Werner

The song was an instant success and became a hit record for Bluebird that year. However, the listening public, including possibly RCA executives themselves, did not realize that his acclaimed original tune was actual a cover of a Jack Golding song he made in 1928 called "Wondering". Joe's success caught the attention of Decca A&R representatives. Without the Ramblers' consent, Joe signed over the rights of the song to Decca, recording a follow-up song called "Answer to Wondering" in 1937. Over the next year, he left the Hackberry Ramblers and started his own group using a variety of musicians including Papa Cairo, Wayne Perry, Happy Fats, and Doc Guidry. He had three more recording sessions with Bluebird and Decca, changing musicians and band names throughout. However, by the end of 1938, most major labels were no longer interested in recording Cajun music, ending Joe's recording career. Alongside the 12 sides recorded with the Ramblers, Joe accomplished 56 more recordings during this time, including "Crap Shooter's Hop" and "Rang Tang Bully".

== After World War II ==
With his recording years behind him, Joe started a family and got a job working for the local newspaper. Joe settled into playing music on Crowley's radio station KSIG, where he would often feature his four children accompanying him. Richard, Walter, Jo Anne, Lou Ella. (ref. Grandson Brian Whitley) This came to a halt in 1951 when his oldest son, Richard, was killed in a tragic auto accident. The following year, Webb Pierce heard Werner's recording and turned it into one of his hit songs, spending four weeks at the top in 1952. Joe continued to write columns for the newspaper and made occasional appearances in town until he moved to Fort Worth, Texas with his wife Anne. He died in 1978.

== Discography ==
- Joe Werner: Early Cajun Artist (BACM CD 543, 2016)
- CAJUN-Rare & Authentic (JSP, 2008)
- Cajun Country Volume 2: More Hits From The Swamp (JSP, 2005)

- Wondering Listen
