= Eddy Arnold discography =

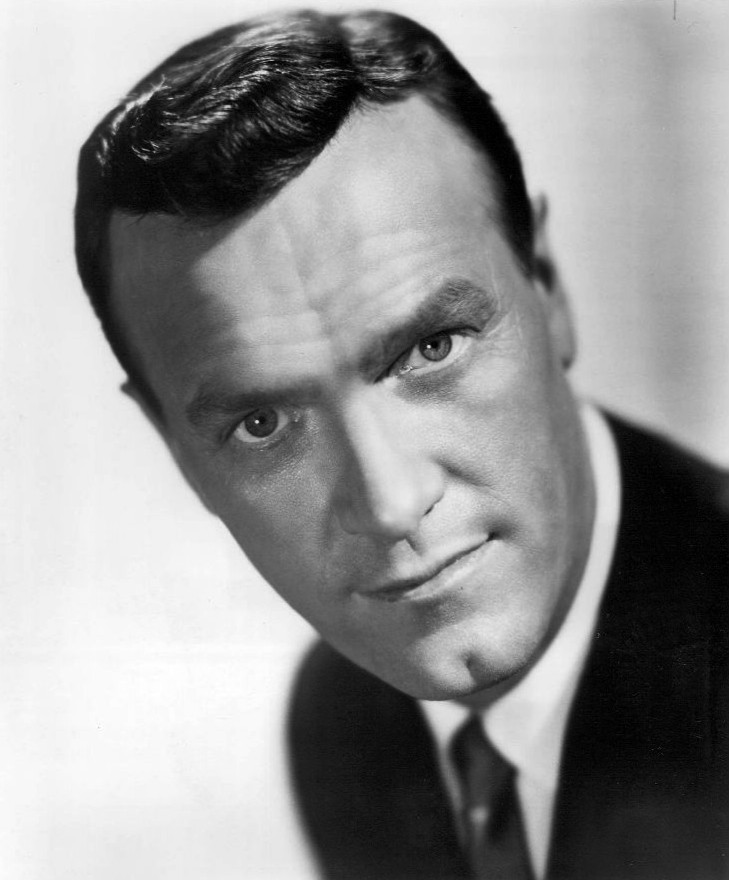
- Studio albums: 52
- Compilation albums: 26
- Singles: 167
- B-sides: 28
- Music videos: 3

The following is a complete discography of all albums released by the late American country music artist Eddy Arnold from 1955 to 2005.

== Studio albums ==
=== 1950s ===
Title	Album details
Wanderin' with Eddy Arnold	Release date: 1955; Label: RCA Victor
Chapel on the Hill	Release date: April 1956; Label: RCA Victor
A Little on the Lonely Side	Release date: January 1957; Label: RCA Victor
My Darling, My Darling	Release date: January 1958; Label: RCA Victor
Praise Him, Praise Him	Release date: July 1958; Label: RCA Victor
Thereby Hangs a Tale	Release date: October 1959; Label: RCA Victor
Have Guitar, Will Travel	Release date: December 1959; Label: RCA Victor

=== 1960s ===
Title	Album details	Peak chart positions		Certifications (sales threshold)
Title	Album details	US Country	US	Certifications (sales threshold)
You Gotta Have Love	Release date: October 1960; Label: RCA Victor	—	—	
One More Time	Release date: April 1962; Label: RCA Victor	—	—	
Christmas with Eddy Arnold	Release date: November 1962; Label: RCA Victor	—	27	
Our Man Down South	Release date: January 1963; Label: RCA Victor	—	—	
Cattle Call	Release date: August 1963; Label: RCA Victor	16	131	
Faithfully Yours	Release date: October 1963; Label: RCA Victor	8	—	
Folk Song Book	Release date: January 1964; Label: RCA Victor	4	—	
Sometimes I'm Happy, Sometimes I'm Blue	Release date: May 1964; Label: RCA Victor	—	—	
Pop Hits from the Country Side	Release date: October 1964; Label: RCA Victor	—	—	
The Easy Way	Release date: May 1965; Label: RCA Victor	1	—	
My World	Release date: August 1965; Label: RCA Victor	1	7	US: Gold
I Want to Go with You	Release date: February 1966; Label: RCA Victor	1	26	
The Last Word in Lonesome	Release date: June 1966; Label: RCA Victor	1	46	
Somebody Like Me	Release date: November 1966; Label: RCA Victor	1	36	
Lonely Again	Release date: February 1967; Label: RCA Victor	1	57	
Turn the World Around	Release date: August 1967; Label: RCA Victor	1	34	
The Everlovin' World of Eddy Arnold	Release date: January 1968; Label: RCA Victor	1	122	
The Romantic World of Eddy Arnold	Release date: April 1968; Label: RCA Victor	2	56	
Walkin' in Love Land	Release date: October 1968; Label: RCA Records	2	70	
Songs of the Young World	Release date: January 1969; Label: RCA Records	11	77	
The Glory of Love	Release date: May 1969; Label: RCA Records	27	167	
The Warmth of Eddy	Release date: October 1969; Label: RCA Records	11	116	
"—" denotes releases that did not chart

=== 1970s ===
Title	Album details	Peak chart positions		Certifications (sales threshold)
Title	Album details	US Country	US	Certifications (sales threshold)
Love and Guitars	Release date: March 1970; Label: RCA Records	30	191	
Standing Alone	Release date: July 1970; Label: RCA Records	43	—	
Portrait of My Woman	Release date: January 1971; Label: RCA Records	17	141	
Welcome to My World	Release date: June 1971; Label: RCA Records	18	—	
Loving Her Was Easier	Release date: October 1971; Label: RCA Records	—	—	
Lonely People	Release date: May 1972; Label: RCA Records	38	—	
Eddy Arnold Sings for Housewives and Other Lovers	Release date: September 1972; Label: RCA Records	39	—	
So Many Ways/ If the Whole World Stopped Lovin'	Release date: 1973; Label: MGM Records	32	—	
She's Got Everything I Need	Release date: 1973; Label: MGM Records	25	—	
I Wish That I Had Loved You Better	Release date: 1974; Label: MGM Records	36	—	
The Wonderful World Of Eddy Arnold	Release date: 1975; Label: MGM Records	—	—	
Eddy	Release date: 1976; Label: RCA Records	26	—	
I Need You All the Time	Release date: 1977; Label: RCA Records	33	—	
Somebody Loves You	Release date: 1979; Label: RCA Records	—	—	
"—" denotes releases that did not chart

=== 1980s–2000s ===
Title	Album details	Peak positions
Title	Album details	US Country
A Legend and His Lady	Release date: 1980; Label: RCA Records	26
A Man For All Seasons	Release date: 1981; Label: RCA Records	—
Don't Give Up on Me	Release date: 1982; Label: RCA Records	—
Close Enough to Love	Release date: 1983; Label: RCA Records	—
You Don't Miss a Thing	Release date: 1991; Label: RCA Records	—
Christmas Time	Release date: 1997; Label: Curb Records	—
Seven Decades of Hits	Release date: September 12, 2000; Label: Curb Records	—
After All These Years	Release date: August 16, 2005; Label: RCA Records	—
"—" denotes releases that did not chart

== Compilation albums ==
Title	Album details	Peak chart positions		Certifications (sales threshold)
Title	Album details	US Country	US	Certifications (sales threshold)
All-Time Favorites	Release date: April 1956; Label: RCA Victor	—	—	
Anytime	Release date: April 1956; Label: RCA Victor	—	—	
A Dozen Hits	Release date: October 1956; Label: RCA Victor	—	—	
That's How Much I Love You	Release date: February 1959; Label: RCA Victor	—	—	
More Eddy Arnold	Release date: April 1960; Label: RCA Victor	—	—	
Eddy Arnold Sings Them Again	Release date: May 1960; Label: RCA Victor	—	—	
Let's Make Memories Tonight	Release date: May 1961; Label: RCA Victor	—	—	
Country Songs I Love to Sing	Release date: February 1963; Label: RCA Camden	—	—	
Eddy's Songs	Release date: February 1964; Label: RCA Camden	—	—	
I'm Throwing Rice...	Release date: June 1965; Label: RCA Camden	—	—	
The Best of Eddy Arnold	Release date: April 1967; Label: RCA Victor	1	34	US: Gold
The Best of Eddy Arnold, Vol. 2	Release date: April 1970; Label: RCA Records	26	146	
This Is Eddy Arnold	Release date: 1970; Label: RCA Records	25	—	
The Best of Eddy Arnold, Vol. 3	Release date: 1973; Label: RCA Records	—	—	
The World of Eddy Arnold	Release date: July 1973; Label: RCA Records	43	—	
Eddy Arnold Sings Love Songs	Release date: 1974; Label: RCA Records	—	—	
Pure Gold	Release date: 1975; Label: RCA Records	—	—	
Echoes	Release date: 1976; Label: RCA Records	—	—	
Legendary Performer	Release date: 1984; Label: RCA Records	—	—	
Greatest Songs	Release date: 1984; Label: Curb Records	—	—	
Collector's Series	Release date: 1985; Label: RCA Records	—	—	
Hand Holdin' Songs	Release date: 1989; Label: RCA Records	—	—	
The Essential Eddy Arnold	Release date: June 18, 1996; Label: RCA Records	—	—	
Early Eddy Arnold	Release date: 1996; Label: RCA Records	—	—	
The Hits	Release date: 1998; Label: Mercury Records	—	—	
"—" denotes releases that did not chart

== Singles ==
=== 1940s ===
Year	Single (A-side, B-side) Both sides from same album except where indicated	Peak chart positions		Album
Year	Single (A-side, B-side) Both sides from same album except where indicated	US Country	US	Album
1945	"Mommy Please Stay Home with Me" b/w "Mother's Prayer" (Non-album track)	—	—	Legendary Performances
1945	"Each Minute Seems a Million Years" b/w "The Cattle Call" (from Cattle Call)	5	—	Non-album tracks
1945	"Did You See My Daddy Over There" b/w "I Walk Alone" (from Eddy Arnold Sings Them Again)	—	—	Non-album tracks
1945	"Many Tears Ago" b/w "You Must Walk the Line" (Non-album track)	—	—	Country Songs I Love To Sing
1946	"I Talk to Myself About You" b/w "(I'll Have To) Live and Learn"	—	—	Non-album tracks
1946	"All Alone in This World Without You" b/w "Can't Win, Can't Place, Can't Show"	7	—	Non-album tracks
1946	"That's How Much I Love You" b/w "Chained to a Memory" (from Country Songs I Love to Sing)	2	—	Anytime
1946	"What Is Life Without Love" b/w "Be Sure There's No Mistake"	1	—	Non-album tracks
1947	"It's a Sin" b/w "I Couldn't Believe It Was True" (Non-album track)	1	—	Anytime
1947	"I'll Hold You in My Heart (Till I Can Hold You in My Arms)" b/w "Don't Bother to Cry" (Non-album track)	1	22	Anytime
1947	"To My Sorrow" b/w "Easy Rockin' Chair"	2	—	Country Songs I Love To Sing
1947	"Rockin' Alone" b/w "I'm Thinking Tonight of My Blue Eyes" (from All-Time Favorites)	—	—	Anytime
1947	"Molly Darling" b/w "It Makes No Difference Now" (from All-Time Favorites)	10	—	Anytime
1947	"Prisoner's Song" b/w "Seven Years with the Wrong Woman"	—	—	All-Time Favorites
1947	"Who at My Door Is Standing" b/w "Will the Circle Be Unbroken"	—	—	Anytime
1948	"Anytime" b/w "What a Fool I Was" (from One More Time)	1	17	Anytime
1948	"Bouquet of Roses" b/w "Texarkana Baby"	1	13	Anytime
1948	"Just a Little Lovin' (Will Go a Long Way)" b/w "My Daddy Is Only a Picture" (Non-album track)	1	13	More Eddy Arnold
1948	"A Heart Full of Love (For a Handful of Kisses)" b/w "Then I Turned and Walked Slowly Away" (Non-album track)	1	23	Anytime
1949	"There's Not a Thing (I Wouldn't Do for You)" b/w "Don't Rob Another Man's Castle" (from Anytime)	3	—	Country Songs I Love to Sing
1949	"That Wonderful Mother of Mine" b/w "M-O-T-H-E-R (A Word That Means the World to Me)"	—	—	To Mother
1949	"Bring Your Roses to Her Now" b/w "I Wish I Had a Girl Like You, Mother"	—	—	To Mother
1949	"One Kiss Too Many" b/w "The Echo of Your Footsteps" (from Country Songs I Love to Sing)	1	23	Eddy's Songs
1949	"I'm Throwing Rice (At the Girl That I Love)" b/w "Show Me the Way Back to Your Heart" (Non-album track)	1	19	One More Time
1949	"The Cattle Call" b/w "The Nearest Thing To Heaven" (Non-album track)	—	—	Cattle Call
1949	"There's No Wings On My Angel" b/w "You Know How Talk Gets Around" (from Country Songs I Love to Sing)	6	—	Eddy's Songs
1949	"Take Me in Your Arms and Hold Me" b/w "Mama and Daddy Broke My Heart" (from 'I'm Throwing Rice' and Other Favorites)	1	—	Let's Make Memories Tonight
"—" denotes releases that did not chart

=== 1950s ===
Year	Single (A-side, B-side) Both sides from the same album except where indicated	Peak chart positions		Album
Year	Single (A-side, B-side) Both sides from the same album except where indicated	US Country	US	Album
1950	"I Wouldn't Trade the Silver in My Mother's Hair" b/w "My Mother's Sweet Voice" (Non-album track)	—	—	'I'm Throwing Rice' and Other Favorites
1950	"What Is Life Without Love" b/w "Be Sure There's No Mistake"	—	—	Non-album tracks
1950	"Little Angel with the Dirty Face" b/w "Why Should I Cry?" (from Eddy's Songs)	3	—	'I'm Throwing Rice' and Other Favorites
1950	"Cuddle Buggin' Baby" b/w "Enclosed, One Broken Heart" (Non-album track)	2	—	Country Songs I Love to Sing
1950	"The Lovebug Itch" b/w "A Prison Without Walls" (Non-album track)	2	—	Eddy Arnold Sings Them Again
1951	"There's Been a Change in Me" b/w "Tie Me to Your Apron Strings Again" (Non-album track)	1	—	Country Songs I Love to Sing
1951	"Kentucky Waltz" b/w "A Million Miles from Your Heart" (Non-album track)	1	—	Eddy's Songs
1951	"I Wanna Play House With You" b/w "Something Old, Something New" (Non-album track)	1	—	Eddy Arnold Sings Them Again
1951	"Somebody's Been Beatin' My Time" b/w "Heart Strings"	2	—	Non-album tracks
1951	"Bundle of Southern Sunshine" b/w "Call Her Your Sweetheart"	4	—	Non-album tracks
1952	"Easy on the Eyes" b/w "Anything That's Part of You" (from Portrait Of My Woman)	1	—	Non-album tracks
1952	"That's How Much I Love You" b/w "A Heart Full of Love"	—	—	Anytime
1952	"Someone Calls Me Daddy" b/w "Don't Ever Take the Ribbons from Your Hair" (from When They Were Young)	—	—	Non-album tracks
1952	"A Full Time Job" b/w "Shepherd of My Heart"	1	—	Non-album tracks
1952	"Older and Bolder" b/w "I'd Trade All of My Tomorrows (For Just One Yesterday)"	3	—	Non-album tracks
1952	"I Want to Thank You Lord" b/w "My Desire"	—	—	Non-album tracks
1952	"Eddy's Song" b/w "Condemned Without Trial"	1	—	Eddy's Songs
1953	"I'm Gonna Sit Right Down (And Write Myself a Letter)" b/w "I'm Waiting for the Ships That Never Come In"	—	—	All-Time Favorites
1953	"When Your Hair Has Turned to Silver" b/w "Angry"	—	—	All-Time Favorites
1953	"Moonlight and Roses (Bring Mem'ries of You)" b/w "The Missouri Waltz"	—	—	All-Time Favorites
1953	"I'm Gonna Lock My Heart" b/w "You Always Hurt the One You Love"	—	—	All-Time Favorites
1953	"Free Home Demonstration" b/w "How's the World Treating You" (from You Gotta Have Love)	4	—	Non-album tracks
1953	"Mama, Come Get Your Baby Boy" b/w "If I Never Get to Heaven" (from Let's Make Memories Tonight)	4	—	Non-album tracks
1953	"I Really Don't Want to Know" b/w "I'll Never Get Over You" (Non-album track)	1	—	Eddy Arnold Sings Them Again
1954	"Robe of Calvary" b/w "Prayer"	—	—	The Chapel on the Hill
1954	"The Chapel on the Hill" b/w "The Touch of God's Hand"	—	—	The Chapel on the Hill
1954	"My Everything" b/w "Second Fling"	7	—	Non-album tracks
1954	"Hep Cat Baby" b/w "This Is the Thanks I Get (For Loving You)" (from One More Time)	7	—	Non-album tracks
1954	"Christmas Can't Be Far Away" b/w "I'm Your Private Santa Claus" (Non-album track)	—	—	Christmas with Eddy Arnold
1955	"I've Been Thinking" b/w "Don't Forget"	2	—	Non-album tracks
1955	"I Always Have Someone to Turn To" b/w "It Took a Miracle" (from The Chapel on the Hill)	—	—	Non-album tracks
1955	"In Time" b/w "Two Kinds of Love"	6	—	Non-album tracks
1955	"The Cattle Call" b/w "The Kentuckian Song" (from One More Time)	1	69	Cattle Call
1955	"That Do Make It Nice" b/w "Just Call Me Lonesome"	1	—	One More Time
1955	"The Richest Man (In the World)" b/w "I Walked Alone Last Night" (Non-album track)	10	99	One More Time
1955	"Trouble in Mind" b/w "When You Said Goodbye"	6	—	Non-album tracks
1956	"Bayou Baby" b/w "Do You Know Where God Lives?" (Non-album track)	—	—	When They Were Young
1956	"You Don't Know Me" b/w "The Rockin' Mockin' Bird" (from 'I'm Throwing Rice' and Other Favorites)	10	—	Eddy Arnold Sings Them Again
1956	"Casey Jones (The Brave Engineer)" b/w "You Were Mine for Awhile" (Non-album track)	15	—	'I'm Throwing Rice' and Other Favorites
1956	"I Wouldn't Know Where to Begin" b/w "The Ballad of Wes Tancred"	—	22	Non-album tracks
1956	"A Dozen Hearts" b/w "A Good Lookin' Blonde"	—	—	Non-album tracks
1957	"Gonna Find Me a Bluebird" b/w "Little Bit" (from More Eddy Arnold)	12	51	'I'm Throwing Rice' and Other Favorites
1957	"Open Your Heart" b/w "Crazy Dream"	—	—	Non-album tracks
1957	"When He Was Young" b/w "Little Miss Sunbeam" (Non-album track)	—	—	When They Were Young
1957	"Wagon Wheels" b/w "You've Made Up for Everything" (Non-album track)	—	—	'I'm Throwing Rice' and Other Favorites
1958	"Too Soon to Know" b/w "I Need Somebody" (from More Eddy Arnold)	—	—	'I'm Throwing Rice' and Other Favorites
1958	"Peck-A-Cheek" b/w "Before You Know It"	—	—	Non-album tracks
1958	"The Day You Left Me" b/w "Real Love" (Non-album track)	—	—	More Eddy Arnold
1958	"I'm a Good Boy" b/w "Till You Come Back Again" (Non-album track)	—	—	Eddy's Songs
1959	"Chip Off the Old Block" b/w "I'll Hold You in My Heart" (from Anytime)	12	97	Eddy's Songs
1959	"Tennessee Stud" b/w "What's the Good (Of All This Love)" (Non-album track)	5	48	Thereby Hangs a Tale
1959	"Sittin' By Sittin' Bull" b/w "Did It Rain" (from Lonely Again)	—	—	Non-album track
"—" denotes releases that did not chart

=== 1960s ===
Year	Single (A-side, B-side) Both sides from same album except where indicated	Peak chart positions							Album
Year	Single (A-side, B-side) Both sides from same album except where indicated	US Country	US	US AC	CAN Country	CAN	CAN AC	UK	Album
1960	"Johnny Reb That's Me" b/w "Boot Hill"	—	—	—	—	—	—	—	Thereby Hangs a Tail
1960	"My Arms Are a House" b/w "Little Sparrow" (Non-album track)	—	—	—	—	—	—	—	Let's Make Memories Tonight
1960	"Before This Day Ends" b/w "Just Out of Reach" (from One More Time)	23	—	—	—	—	—	—	The Best of Eddy Arnold, Vol. 3
1961	"(Jim) I Wore a Tie Today" b/w "Just Call" (Non-album track)	27	—	—	—	—	—	—	Cattle Call
1961	"One Grain of Sand" b/w "The Worst Night of My Life" (from Eddy's Songs)	17	107	—	—	—	—	—	One More Time
1962	"Tears Broke Out on Me" b/w "I'll Do as Much for You Someday"	7	102	—	—	—	—	—	Non-album tracks
1962	"A Little Heartache" b/w "After Loving You" (from Sometimes I'm Happy, Sometimes I'm Blue)	3	103	—	—	—	—	—	Non-album tracks
1962	"Does He Mean That Much to You" b/w "Tender Touch"	5	98	—	—	—	—	—	Non-album tracks
1963	"Yesterday's Memories" b/w "Lonely Balladeer"	11	—	—	—	—	—	—	Non-album tracks
1963	"A Million Years or So" b/w "Just A Ribbon"	13	—	—	—	—	—	—	Non-album tracks
1963	"Jealous Hearted Me" b/w "I Met Her Today"	12	—	—	—	—	—	—	Non-album tracks
1964	"Molly" b/w "The Song of the Coo Coo"	5	—	—	—	—	—	—	Folk Song Book
1964	"Sweet Adorable You" b/w "Why" (from The Last Word in Lonesome)	26	—	—	—	—	—	—	Non-album tracks
1964	"I Thank My Lucky Stars" b/w "I Don't Cry No More"	8	—	—	—	—	—	—	Non-album tracks
1965	"What's He Doing in My World" b/w "Laura Lee" (Non-album track)	1	60	18	—	—	—	—	My World
1965	"I'm Letting You Go" b/w "The Days Gone By"	15	135	33	—	—	—	—	My World
1965	"Make the World Go Away" b/w "The Easy Way" (from The Easy Way)	1	6	1	—	—	2	8	My World
1966	"I Want to Go with You" b/w "You'd Better Stop Tellin' Lies (About Me)"	1	36	1	—	58	8	46	I Want to Go with You
1966	"The Last Word in Lonesome Is Me" b/w "Mary Claire Melvina Rebecca Jane" (from My World)	2	40	9	—	43	—	—	The Last Word in Lonesome
1966	"The Tip of My Fingers" b/w "Long, Long Friendship" (from The Last Word in Lonesome)	3	43	8	—	57	—	—	Somebody Like Me
1966	"Somebody Like Me" b/w "Taking Chances" (from My World)	1	53	15	—	54	—	—	Somebody Like Me
1966	"The First Word" b/w "The Angel and The Stranger"	51	—	—	—	—	—	—	Non-album tracks
1967	"Lonely Again" b/w "Love on My Mind" (from Somebody Like Me)	1	87	11	—	86	—	—	Lonely Again
1967	"Misty Blue" b/w "Calling Mary Names" (Non-album track)	3	57	13	—	41	—	—	The Last Word in Lonesome
1967	"Turn the World Around" b/w "The Long Ride Home" (Non-album track)	1	66	3	4	47	—	—	Turn The World Around
1967	"Here Comes Heaven" b/w "Baby That's Living"	2	91	15	1	95	—	—	The Everlovin' World of Eddy Arnold
1967	"This World of Ours" b/w "Jolly Old Saint Nicholas" (Non-album track)	—	—	—	—	—	—	—	The World of Eddy Arnold
1968	"Here Comes the Rain, Baby" b/w "The World I Used to Know" (from The Everlovin' World of Eddy Arnold)	4	74	20	—	46	—	—	Non-album track
1968	"It's Over" b/w "No Matter Whose Baby You Are"	4	74	15	15	68	—	—	The Romantic World of Eddy Arnold
1968	"Then You Can Tell Me Goodbye" b/w "Apples, Raisins and Roses"	1	84	6	1	57	—	—	Walkin' in Love Land
1968	"They Don't Make Love Like They Used To" b/w "What a Wonderful World" (from The Romantic World Of Eddy Arnold)	10	99	19	2	79	—	—	Songs of the Young World
1969	"Please Don't Go" b/w "Heaven Below"	10	129	33	3	—	—	—	The Glory of Love
1969	"But For Love" b/w "My Lady of Love" (Non-album track)	19	125	31	—	—	—	—	The Glory of Love
1969	"You Fool" b/w "You Don't Need Me Anymore"	69	—	—	—	—	—	—	The Warmth of Eddy
1969	"Since December" b/w "Morning of My Mind"	73	—	—	—	—	—	—	Non-album tracks
"—" denotes releases that did not chart

=== 1970s ===
Year	Single (A-side, B-side) Both sides from same album except where indicated	Peak chart positions		Album
Year	Single (A-side, B-side) Both sides from same album except where indicated	US Country	CAN Country	Album
1970	"Soul Deep"^{[A]} b/w "(Today) I Started Loving You Again"	22	44	Love and Guitars
1970	"A Man's Kind of Woman" b/w "Living Under Pressure" (Non-album track)	28	—	Love and Guitars
1970	"From Heaven to Heartache" b/w "Ten Times Forever More"	22	41	Non-album tracks
1970	"Portrait of My Woman" b/w "I Really Don't Want to Know"	26	9	Portrait of My Woman
1971	"A Part of America Died" b/w "Call Me"	41	—	Non-album tracks
1971	"Welcome to My World" b/w "It Ain't No Big Thing (But It's Growing)" (from Portrait of My Woman)	34	—	Welcome to My World
1971	"I Love You Dear" b/w "Long Life, Lots Of Happiness"	55	—	Loving Her Was Easier
1972	"Lonely People" b/w "If It's Alright with You"	38	—	Lonely People
1972	"Poisoned Red Berries" b/w "Just Out of Reach"	—	—	Lonely People
1972	"Lucy" b/w "The Last Letter" (from Lonely People)	62	—	Eddy Arnold Sings for Housewives and Other Lovers
1972	"So Many Ways" b/w "Once in a While"	28	15	So Many Ways
1973	"If the Whole World Stopped Lovin'" b/w "My Son I Wish You Everything"	56	76	So Many Ways
1973	"Oh, Oh, I'm Falling in Love Again" b/w "Any Way You Want Me (That's How I Will Be)"	29	—	She's Got Everything I Need
1973	"She's Got Everything I Need" b/w "I'm Glad You Happened to Me"	24	65	She's Got Everything I Need
1974	"Just for Old Times Sake" b/w "I Got This Thing About You" (Non-album track)	56	—	She's Got Everything I Need
1974	"I Wish I Had Loved You Better" b/w "Let It Be Love"	19	23	I Wish I Had Loved You Better
1974	"Butterfly" b/w "If You Could Only Love Me Now"	47	—	I Wish I Had Loved You Better
1975	"Red Roses for a Blue Lady" b/w "I Will"	60	—	The Wonderful World
1975	"Middle of a Memory" b/w "I Just Had You on My Mind"	86	—	The Wonderful World
1976	"Cowboy" b/w "Don't Let the Good Times Roll Away"	13	6	Eddy
1976	"Put Me Back into Your World" b/w "Goodnight, Irene"	43	—	Eddy
1977	"(I Need You) All the Time" b/w "I've Never Loved Anyone More"	22	36	I Need You All the Time
1977	"Freedom Ain't the Same Thing as Being Free" b/w Short version of A-side	53	—	Eddy
1977	"Where Lonely People Go" b/w "Penny Arcade"	83	—	Non-album tracks
1978	"Country Lovin'" b/w "I've So Much to Be Thankful For"	23	16	Non-album tracks
1978	"I'm the South" b/w "You Are My Sunshine"	91	—	Non-album tracks
1978	"If Everyone Had Someone Like You" b/w "You're a Beautiful Place to Be"	13	12	Somebody Loves You
1979	"What in Her World Did I Do" b/w "The Love of My Life"	21	26	Somebody Loves You
1979	"Goodbye" b/w "You're So Good at Lovin' Me"	22	60	Somebody Loves You
1979	"If I Ever Had to Say Goodbye to You" b/w "The Love of My Life"	28	—	Somebody Loves You
"—" denotes releases that did not chart

=== 1980s ===
Year	Single	Peak chart positions		Album
Year	Single	US Country	CAN Country	Album
1980	"Let's Get It While the Gettin's Good"	6	17	A Legend and His Lady
1980	"That's What I Get for Lovin' You"	10	50	A Legend and His Lady
1980	"Don't Look Now (But We Just Fell in Love)"	11	—	A Man For All Seasons
1981	"Bally-Hoo Days"	32	—	A Man For All Seasons
1981	"All I'm Missing Is You"	30	—	Don't Give Up on Me
1982	"Don't Give Up on Me"	73	—	Don't Give Up on Me
1983	"The Blues Don't Care Who's Got 'Em"	76	—	Close Enough to Love
"—" denotes releases that did not chart

=== 1990s–2000s ===
Year	Single	Peak chart positions		Album
Year	Single	US Country	US Country Sales	Album
1990	"You Don't Miss a Thing"	—	—	You Don't Miss a Thing
1993	"Out of the Blue"	—	—	Last of the Love Song; Singers: Then and Now
1999	"Cattle Call" (with LeAnn Rimes)	—	18	Seven Decades of Hits
2005	"Old Porch Swing"	—	—	After All These Years
2006	"Don't She Look Good"	—	—	After All These Years
2008	"To Life"	49	—	After All These Years
"—" denotes releases that did not chart

== Other singles ==
=== Collaborations ===
Year	Single	Artist	Peak positions	Album
Year	Single	Artist	US	Album
1956	"Mutual Admiration Society"	Jaye P. Morgan	47	—N/a
1957	"One"	Jaye P. Morgan	—	—N/a
"—" denotes releases that did not chart

=== Gospel singles ===
Year	Single	Peak positions	Album
Year	Single	US Country	Album
1950	"Evil Not Tempt Me"	—	—N/a
1950	"Beautiful Isle of Somewhere"	—	—N/a
1950	"(In the) Hills of Tomorrow"	—	—N/a
1951	"May the Good Lord Bless and Keep You"	8	Faithfully Yours
1951	"Jesus and the Atheist"	—	—N/a
1951	"Sinner's Prayer"	—	—N/a
1952	"Open Thy Merciful Arms"	—	Faithfully Yours
1952	"I Want to Thank You Lord"	—	—N/a
"—" denotes releases that did not chart

=== Christmas singles ===
Year	Single	Peak positions	Album
Year	Single	US Country	Album
1949	"C-H-R-I-S-T-M-A-S"	7	Christmas with Eddy Arnold
1950	"White Christmas"	—	Christmas with Eddy Arnold
1954	"Christmas Can't Be Far Away"	12	Christmas with Eddy Arnold
1967	"Jolly Old Saint Nicholas"	—	Christmas with Eddy Arnold
"—" denotes releases that did not chart

=== Guest singles ===
Year	Single	Artist	Peak positions	Album
Year	Single	Artist	US Country	Album
1967	"Chet's Tune"	Some of Chet's Friends	38	—N/a
1985	"One Big Family"	Heart of Nashville	61	—N/a
"—" denotes releases that did not chart

== Charted B-sides ==
Year	B-side	Peak chart positions		A-side single
Year	B-side	US Country	US	A-side single
1946	"Chained to a Memory"	3	—	"That's How Much I Love You"
1947	"I Couldn't Believe It Was True"	4	—	"It's a Sin"
1948	"What a Fool I Was"	2	29	"Anytime"
1948	"Texarkana Baby"	1	18	"Bouquet of Roses"
1948	"My Daddy Is Only a Picture"	5	—	"Just a Little Lovin' (Will Go a Long Way)"
1948	"Then I Turned and Walked Slowly Away"	2	30	"A Heart Full of Love (For a Handful of Kisses)"
1949	"Don't Rob Another Man's Castle"	1	23	"There's Not a Thing (I Wouldn't Do for You)"
1949	"The Echo of Your Footsteps"	2	—	"One Kiss Too Many"
1949	"Show Me the Way Back to Your Heart"	7	—	"I'm Throwing Rice (At the Girl That I Love)"
1949	"Mommy and Daddy Broke My Heart"	6	—	"Take Me in Your Arms and Hold Me"
1949	"Will Santa Come to Shanty Town"	5	—	"C-H-R-I-S-T-M-A-S"
1950	"Why Should I Cry"	3	—	"Little Angel with the Dirty Face"
1950	"Enclosed, One Broken Heart"	6	—	"Cuddle, Buggin' Baby"
1950	"A Prison Without Walls"	10	—	"The Lovebug Itch"
1951	"Something Old, Something New"	4	—	"I Wanna Play House with You"
1951	"Heart Strings"	5	—	"Somebody's Been Beatin' My Time"
1951	"Call Her Your Sweetheart"	9	—	"Bundle of Southern Sunshine"
1952	"I'd Trade All of Tomorrows (For Just One Yesterday)"	9	—	"Older and Bolder"
1953	"How's the World Treating You"	4	—	"Free Home Demonstration"
1954	"This Is the Thanks I Get (For Loving You)"	3	—	"Hep Cat Baby"
1955	"Don't Forget"	12	—	"I've Been Thinking"
1955	"Two Kinds of Love"	9	—	"In Time"
1955	"The Kentuckian Song"	8	—	"Cattle Call"
1955	"Just Call Me Lonesome"	2	—	"They Do Make It Nice"
1955	"I Walked Alone Last Night"	6	—	"The Richest Man (In the World)"
1962	"After Loving You"	7	112	"A Little Heartache"
1970	"Living Under Pressure"	flip	—	"A Man's Kind of Woman"
1981	"Two Hearts Beat Better Than One"	flip	—	"Bally-Hoo Days"
"—" denotes releases that did not chart

== Music videos ==
Year	Video	Director
1964	"Song of the Coo Coo"	
1985	"One Big Family" (Heart of Nashville)	Steve Von Hagel
1990	"You Don’t Miss a Thing"	Michael Salomon
1993	"Out of the Blue"	Deaton Flanigen
2005	"Old Porch Swing"	

== Notes ==
- A "Soul Deep" also peaked at number 28 on the U.S. Billboard Hot Adult Contemporary Tracks chart and at number 23 on the RPM Adult Contemporary Tracks chart in Canada.
