= The Essential Eddy Arnold =

Compilation album by Eddy Arnold
- Released: June 18, 1996
- Genre: Country
- Length: 51:51
- Label: RCA Records
- Producer: Steve Lindsey (Compilation)

Eddy Arnold chronology
You Don't Miss a Thing (1991)	The Essential Eddy Arnold (1996)	Early Eddy Arnold (1996)

Professional ratings
Review scores
Source	Rating
AllMusic	4.5/5 stars

The Essential Eddy Arnold is a twenty track compilation by country musician Eddy Arnold, released in 1996. AllMusic's Thom Owens says that this album is "the only single-disc retrospective that offers a reasonably thorough overview of his hit singles"

== Track listing ==
No.	Title	Writer(s)	Length
1.	"It's a Sin"	Zeb Turner; Fred Rose	2:24
2.	"I'll Hold You in My Heart (Till I Can Hold You in My Arms)"	Eddy Arnold; Hall Horton; Tommy Dilbeck	2:40
3.	"Don't Rob Another Man's Castle"	Jenny Lou Carson	2:33
4.	"Eddy's Song"	Charles Randolph Grean; Cy Coben	2:20
5.	"I Really Don't Want to Know" (Remake)	Don Robertson; Howard Barnes	2:46
6.	"Make the World Go Away"	Hank Cochran	2:38
7.	"Molly Darling"	Eddy Arnold	2:33
8.	"Just Call Me Lonesome"	Rex Griffin	2:23
9.	"The Tip of My Fingers"	Bill Anderson	2:57
10.	"Cattle Call"	Tex Owens	2:41
11.	"What's He Doing in My World"	Carl Belew; Eddie Bush; Billy Joe Moore	2:09
12.	"Anytime"	Herbert "Happy" Lawson	2:13
13.	"I Want to Go with You"	Hank Cochran	2:38
14.	"Somebody Like Me"	Wayne Carson	2:25
15.	"Take Me in Your Arms and Hold Me"	Cindy Walker	2:21
16.	"Lonely Again"	Jean Chapel	2:43
17.	"Turn the World Around"	Ben Peters	2:27
18.	"Then You Can Tell Me Goodbye"	John D. Loudermilk	2:46
19.	"That's What I Get for Loving You"	Bobby Lee Springfield	2:37
20.	"You Don't Miss a Thing"	Fred O. Knipe	3:37
Total length:			51:51

- Track information and credits taken from the album's liner notes.
