= List of Top Country LP's number ones of 1968 =

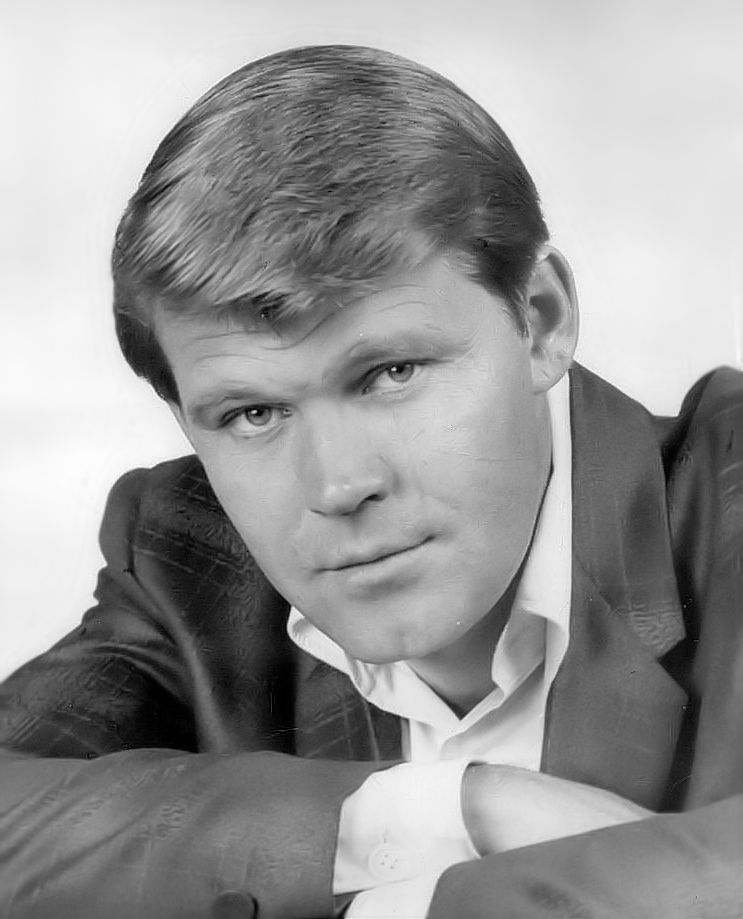
Glen Campbell topped the chart in 1968 with five solo albums and one in collaboration with Bobbie Gentry.

Top Country Albums is a chart that ranks the top-performing country music albums in the United States, published by Billboard. In 1967, 17 different albums topped the chart based on sales reports submitted by a representative sample of stores nationwide. The chart was published under the banner Hot Country Albums in the issue of Billboard dated January 6, but the title changed to Top Country LPs the following week.

In the issue of Billboard dated January 6, Eddy Arnold was at number one with the album Turn the World Around, the record's third week in the top spot. It remained at number one for the first five weeks of 1968 before it was displaced from the top spot in the issue dated February 10 by By the Time I Get to Phoenix by Glen Campbell, which spent four weeks atop the chart. It was the first chart-topping album for Campbell, who had previously worked largely as a session musician, but it marked the start of an unbroken run of number ones in quick succession. In June, he returned to number one with Hey Little One, and two months later was back at the top of the listing with A New Place in the Sun, which spent six weeks at number one, the longest unbroken run atop the chart during 1968. Four weeks after that album was displaced from the top spot, Campbell returned to number one with Gentle on My Mind, which had first entered the chart in October of the previous year and finally reached the top spot more than a year later. Two weeks later, the album was replaced at number one by Bobbie Gentry and Glen Campbell, a collaborative album with Bobbie Gentry. In the issue of Billboard dated November 30, Campbell achieved his sixth number-one album of 1968 with Wichita Lineman, which occupied the top spot for the final five weeks of the year. His total of 19 weeks at number one was the most by any artist, more than twice that achieved by any other act.

Two members of the Country Music Hall of Fame topped the albums chart for the final time in 1968. Buck Owens, one of the most successful country singers of the mid-1960s, had achieved twelve chart-topping albums in slightly over four years since the listing was first published, but It Takes People Like You to Make People Like Me would be his last release to reach the top of the chart. The album was twice displaced from the number-one position by The Everlovin' World of Eddy Arnold, which would prove to be the final chart-topper for Eddy Arnold, who had experienced considerable success in the late 1940s and early 1950s and then revived his career in the mid-1960s by embracing the "Nashville sound", a newer style of country music which eschewed elements of the earlier honky-tonk style in favour of smooth productions which had a broader appeal, A third Hall of Famer, Tammy Wynette, reached the top of the chart for the first time with D-I-V-O-R-C-E. Although only three of her nearly 50 charting albums went all the way to number one, her lengthy and successful career led to her being dubbed the "first lady of country".

== Chart history ==
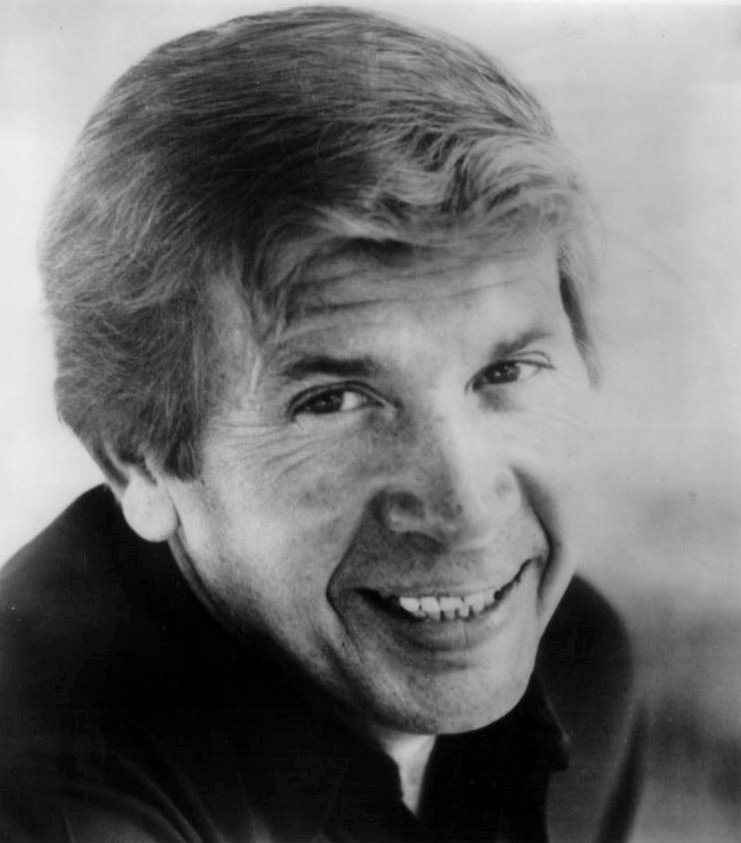
Buck Owens had his final number-one album in 1968.

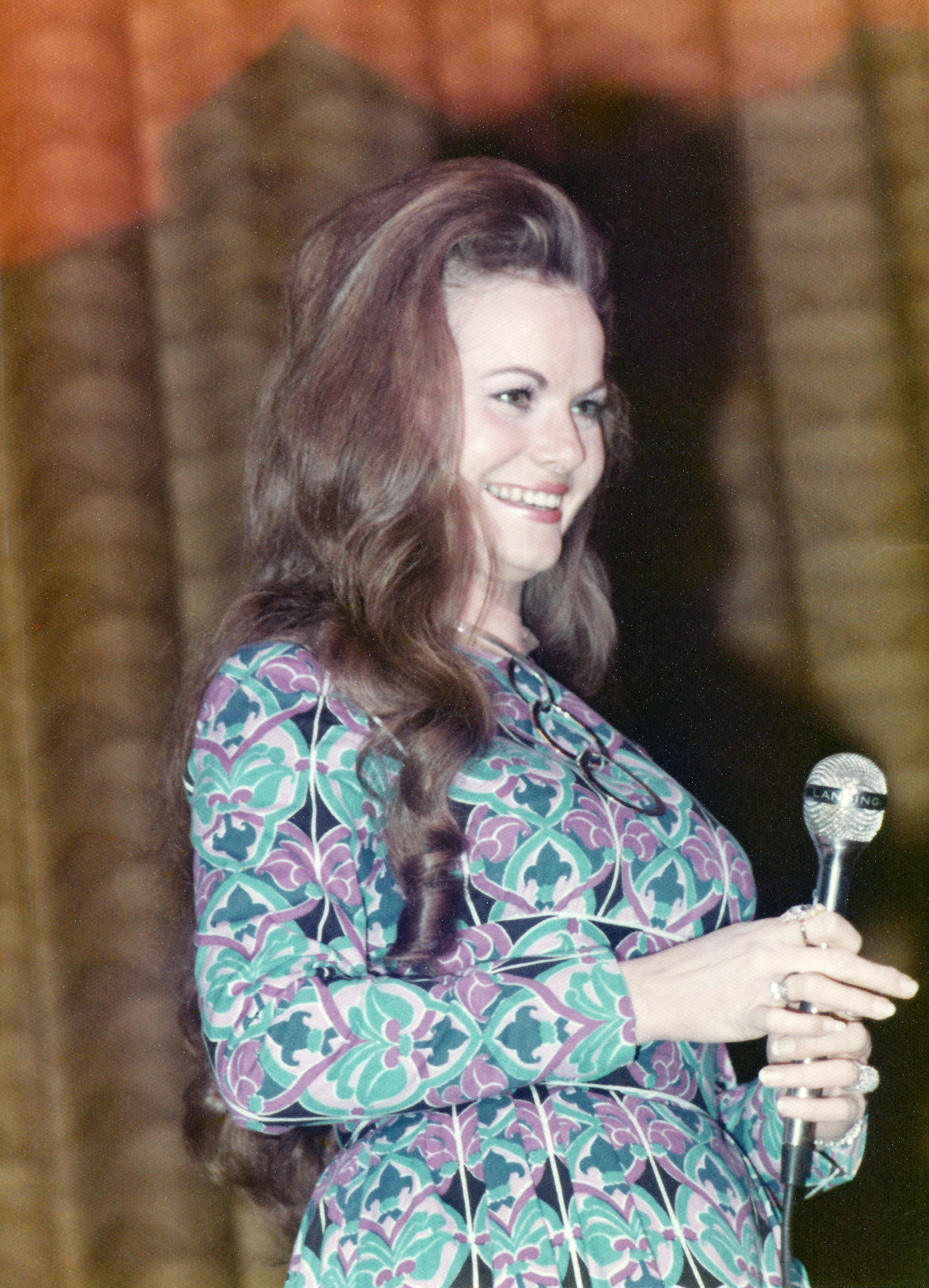
Jeannie C. Riley topped the albums chart with Harper Valley P.T.A., named for her chart-topping song of the same title

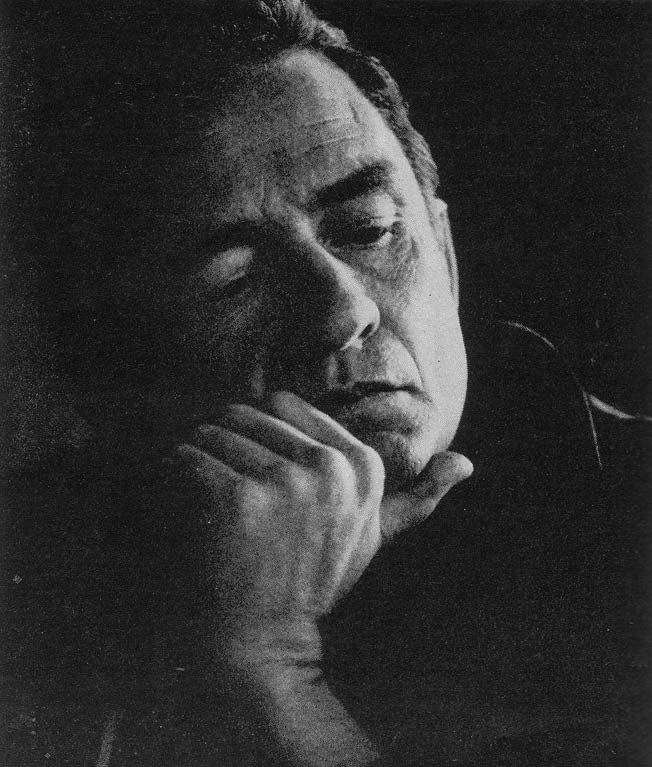
Johnny Cash reached the top spot with Johnny Cash at Folsom Prison, recorded at the California correctional facility.

Issue date	Title	Artist(s)	Ref.
January 6	Turn the World Around	Eddy Arnold	
January 13	Turn the World Around	Eddy Arnold	
January 20	Turn the World Around	Eddy Arnold	
January 27	Turn the World Around	Eddy Arnold	
February 3	Turn the World Around	Eddy Arnold	
February 10	By the Time I Get to Phoenix	Glen Campbell	
February 17	By the Time I Get to Phoenix	Glen Campbell	
February 24	By the Time I Get to Phoenix	Glen Campbell	
March 2	By the Time I Get to Phoenix	Glen Campbell	
March 9	Sing Me Back Home	Merle Haggard and the Strangers	
March 16	It Takes People Like You to Make People Like Me	Buck Owens and his Buckaroos	
March 23	It Takes People Like You to Make People Like Me	Buck Owens and his Buckaroos	
March 30	It Takes People Like You to Make People Like Me	Buck Owens and his Buckaroos	
April 6	The Everlovin' World of Eddy Arnold	Eddy Arnold	
April 13	It Takes People Like You to Make People Like Me	Buck Owens and his Buckaroos	
April 20	The Everlovin' World of Eddy Arnold	Eddy Arnold	
April 27	The Everlovin' World of Eddy Arnold	Eddy Arnold	
May 4	The Everlovin' World of Eddy Arnold	Eddy Arnold	
May 11	Promises, Promises	Lynn Anderson	
May 18	The Country Way	Charley Pride	
May 25	Honey	Bobby Goldsboro	
June 1	Honey	Bobby Goldsboro	
June 8	Hey Little One	Glen Campbell	
June 15	Fist City	Loretta Lynn	
June 22	Fist City	Loretta Lynn	
June 29	Honey	Bobby Goldsboro	
July 6	Honey	Bobby Goldsboro	
July 13	Honey	Bobby Goldsboro	
July 20	Johnny Cash at Folsom Prison	Johnny Cash	
July 27	Johnny Cash at Folsom Prison	Johnny Cash	
August 3	Johnny Cash at Folsom Prison	Johnny Cash	
August 10	A New Place in the Sun	Glen Campbell	
August 17	A New Place in the Sun	Glen Campbell	
August 24	A New Place in the Sun	Glen Campbell	
August 31	A New Place in the Sun	Glen Campbell	
September 7	A New Place in the Sun	Glen Campbell	
September 14	A New Place in the Sun	Glen Campbell	
September 21	D-I-V-O-R-C-E	Tammy Wynette	
September 28	D-I-V-O-R-C-E	Tammy Wynette	
October 5	Johnny Cash at Folsom Prison	Johnny Cash	
October 12	Gentle on My Mind	Glen Campbell	
October 19	Gentle on My Mind	Glen Campbell	
October 26	Bobbie Gentry and Glen Campbell	Bobbie Gentry and Glen Campbell	
November 2	Harper Valley PTA	Jeannie C. Riley	
November 9	Harper Valley PTA	Jeannie C. Riley	
November 16	Harper Valley PTA	Jeannie C. Riley	
November 23	Harper Valley PTA	Jeannie C. Riley	
November 30	Wichita Lineman	Glen Campbell	
December 7	Wichita Lineman	Glen Campbell	
December 14	Wichita Lineman	Glen Campbell	
December 21	Wichita Lineman	Glen Campbell	
December 28	Wichita Lineman	Glen Campbell	
