= Cattle Call =

A cattle call is an open audition.

Cattle Call may also refer to:

- Cattle Call (film), a 2006 comedy film by National Lampoon
- Cattle Call (album), a 1963 album by Eddy Arnold
- "The Cattle Call", a song by Tex Owens
- Cattle Call (company), a video game company

== See also ==
- Kulning, or cow-calling, a Scandinavian music form for calling livestock
