= List of Hot Country Albums number ones of 1967 =

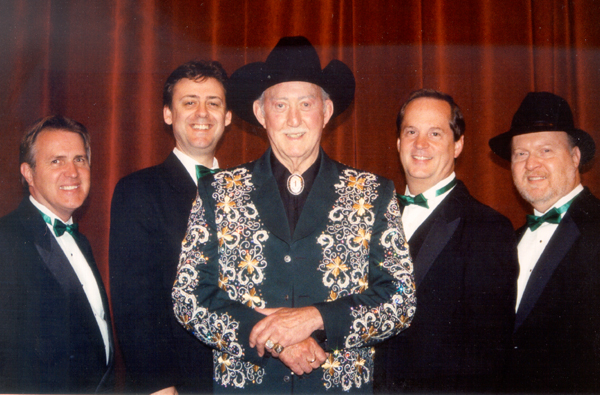
Jack Greene (center, pictured in 2003) had two chart-topping albums in 1967.

Top Country Albums is a chart that ranks the top-performing country music albums in the United States, published by Billboard. In 1967, 17 different albums topped the chart, which was at the time published under the title Hot Country Albums, based on sales reports submitted by a representative sample of stores nationwide.

In the issue of Billboard dated January 7, Sonny James was at number one with the compilation album The Best of Sonny James, the record's third week in the top spot. It was displaced from the top spot in the issue dated January 21 by Somebody Like Me by Eddy Arnold. One of the biggest country stars of the 1960s, Arnold had four chart-topping albums in 1967, which spent a combined total of 18 weeks in the top spot, the most by any artist. He also had the two longest unbroken runs atop the chart, spending seven weeks at number one with The Best of Eddy Arnold in the summer and six weeks in the top spot with Turn the World Around in November and December. Three other acts also had more than one number one in 1967. Buck Owens and his Buckaroos had three chart-toppers, but each spent only a single week at number one. Jack Greene had two number ones, as did Sonny James, whose backing group, the Southern Gentlemen, received joint billing on the second of his two chart-toppers.

In October, Bobbie Gentry topped the chart with Ode to Billie Joe, named for her song of the same title, which had topped Billboard's all-genre singles chart, the Hot 100, in August. Gentry was only the third female singer to have a number-one country album in the near four-year history of the chart, following Connie Smith and Loretta Lynn. Ode to Billie Joe also topped the magazine's overall Top LPs chart, displacing Sgt. Pepper's Lonely Hearts Club Band by the Beatles from the top spot. Jack Greene also topped the country albums chart for the first time when There Goes My Everything reached the top spot in February. Greene was at the peak of his career in 1967, winning the awards for Male Vocalist of the Year, Single of the Year and Album of the Year at the inaugural Country Music Association Awards ceremony, but his second chart-topping album of 1967 would prove to be the last of his career. Wynn Stewart also reached number one for the first time in 1967 with It's Such a Pretty World Today, but its two weeks atop the chart would be his only appearance at number one; he continued to achieve hits into the early 1970s but his career then went into decline due to changing musical tastes and his problems with alcoholism.

== Chart history ==
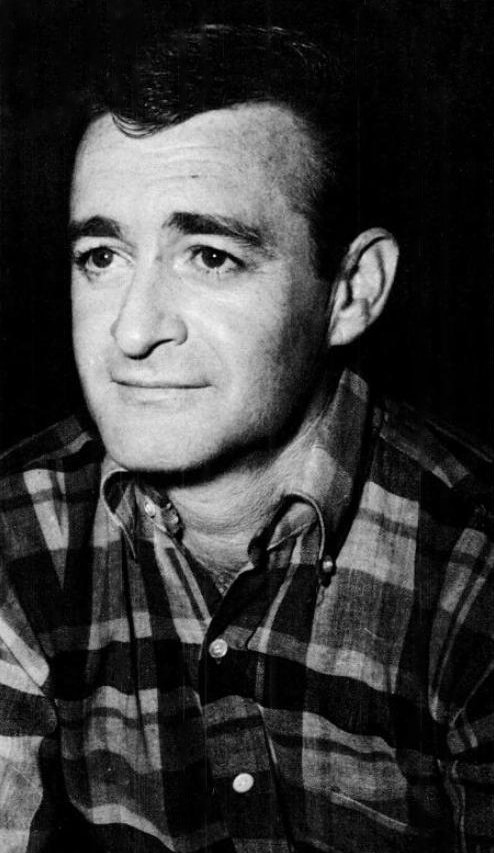
Wynn Stewart had his only chart-topping album with It's Such a Pretty World Today.

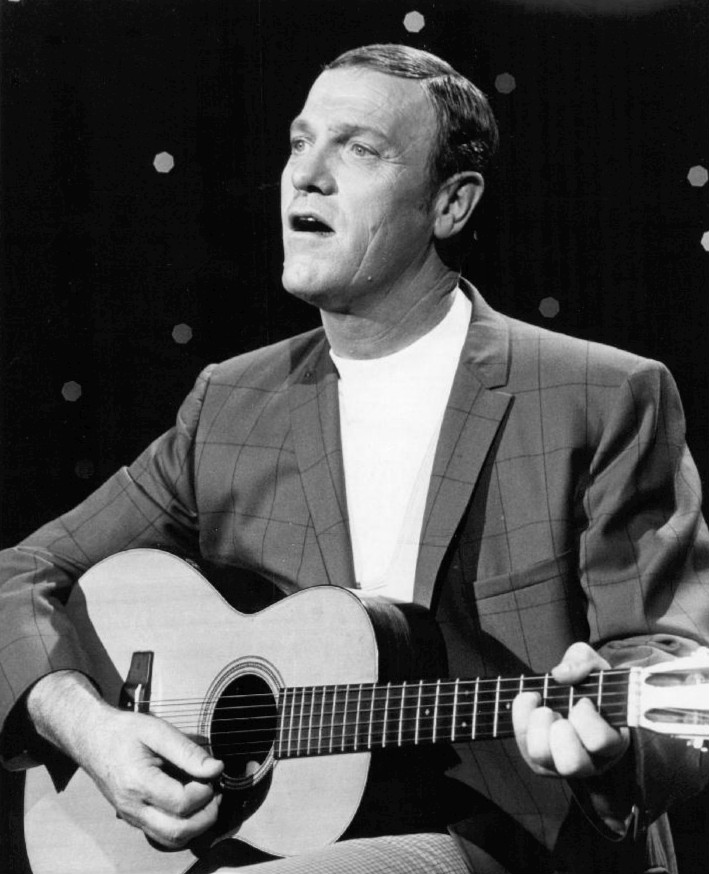
Eddy Arnold had four number ones in 1967.

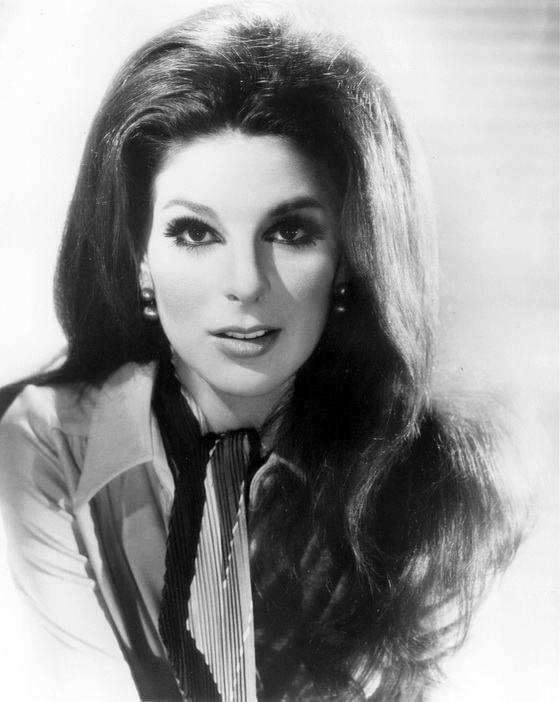
Bobbie Gentry reached number one with her album Ode to Billie Joe. She was only the third female vocalist to top the chart.

Issue date	Title	Artist(s)	Ref.
January 7	The Best of Sonny James	Sonny James	
January 14	The Best of Sonny James	Sonny James	
January 21	Somebody Like Me	Eddy Arnold	
January 28	Somebody Like Me	Eddy Arnold	
February 4	The Best of Sonny James	Sonny James	
February 11	There Goes My Everything	Jack Greene	
February 18	There Goes My Everything	Jack Greene	
February 25	There Goes My Everything	Jack Greene	
March 4	There Goes My Everything	Jack Greene	
March 11	There Goes My Everything	Jack Greene	
March 18	Open Up Your Heart	Buck Owens and his Buckaroos	
March 25	There Goes My Everything	Jack Greene	
April 1	There Goes My Everything	Jack Greene	
April 8	There Goes My Everything	Jack Greene	
April 15	Lonely Again	Eddy Arnold	
April 22	Lonely Again	Eddy Arnold	
April 29	Touch My Heart	Ray Price	
May 6	Lonely Again	Eddy Arnold	
May 13	There Goes My Everything	Jack Greene	
May 20	Don't Come Home a Drinkin' (With Lovin' on Your Mind)	Loretta Lynn	
May 27	The Best of Eddy Arnold	Eddy Arnold	
June 3	The Best of Eddy Arnold	Eddy Arnold	
June 10	The Best of Eddy Arnold	Eddy Arnold	
June 17	The Best of Eddy Arnold	Eddy Arnold	
June 24	The Best of Eddy Arnold	Eddy Arnold	
July 1	The Best of Eddy Arnold	Eddy Arnold	
July 8	The Best of Eddy Arnold	Eddy Arnold	
July 15	Need You	Sonny James and the Southern Gentlemen	
July 22	Buck Owens and his Buckaroos in Japan!	Buck Owens and his Buckaroos	
July 29	All the Time	Jack Greene	
August 5	All the Time	Jack Greene	
August 12	All the Time	Jack Greene	
August 19	All the Time	Jack Greene	
August 26	It's Such a Pretty World Today	Wynn Stewart	
September 2	It's Such a Pretty World Today	Wynn Stewart	
September 9	All the Time	Jack Greene	
September 16	Johnny Cash's Greatest Hits, Vol. 1	Johnny Cash	
September 23	Johnny Cash's Greatest Hits, Vol. 1	Johnny Cash	
September 30	Johnny Cash's Greatest Hits, Vol. 1	Johnny Cash	
October 7	Ode to Billie Joe	Bobbie Gentry	
October 14	Ode to Billie Joe	Bobbie Gentry	
October 21	Ode to Billie Joe	Bobbie Gentry	
October 28	Your Tender Loving Care	Buck Owens and his Buckaroos	
November 4	Turn the World Around	Eddy Arnold	
November 11	Turn the World Around	Eddy Arnold	
November 18	Turn the World Around	Eddy Arnold	
November 25	Turn the World Around	Eddy Arnold	
December 2	Turn the World Around	Eddy Arnold	
December 9	Turn the World Around	Eddy Arnold	
December 16	Branded Man	Merle Haggard and the Strangers	
December 23	Turn the World Around	Eddy Arnold	
December 30	Turn the World Around	Eddy Arnold	
