= Turn the World Around =

Turn the World Around may refer to:

- Turn the World Around (Harry Belafonte album), 1977, or the title song
- Turn the World Around (Eddy Arnold album), 1967
- "Turn the World Around" (song), a 1967 song by Eddy Arnold
