= Texas Ruby =

American singer-songwriter (1908–1963)

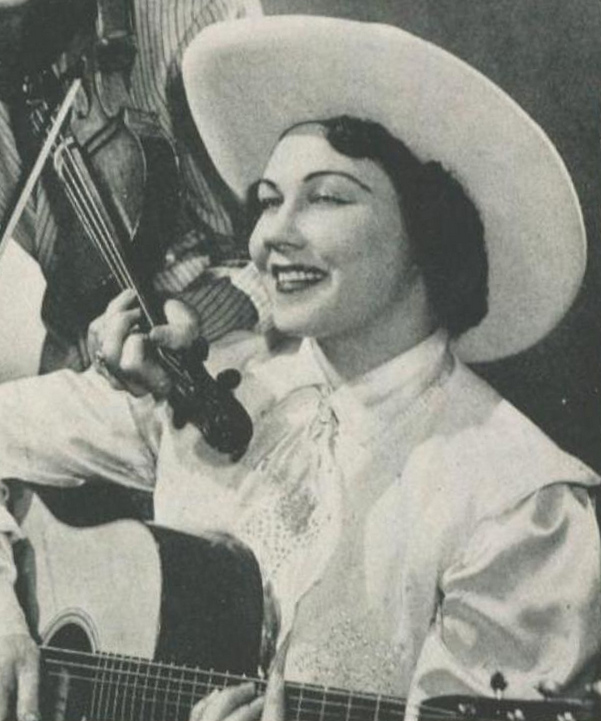

Background information
- Birth name: Ruby Agnes Owens
- Born: May 4, 1908; Wise County, Texas, near Decatur, U.S.
- Origin: Wise County, Texas, United States
- Died: March 29, 1963 (aged 54)
- Genres: Country music
- Instrument(s): Guitar, vocals
- Years active: 1937–1963

Ruby Agnes Owens (June 4, 1908 – March 29, 1963), professionally better known as Texas Ruby, was an American pioneering country music female vocalist and musician of the late 1930s through to the early 1960s. Her brother was famous as Tex Owens, the writer of Cattle Call.

== Early life ==
Ruby was born on a ranch in Wise County, Texas, near Decatur, United States. When she was three years old she started to sing, often together with her two brothers. Her career began when a radio station owner in Kansas City radio station heard her sing in Fort Worth, Texas. In early 1937, she made her debut recording for Decca Records. Later that year, she met fellow musician Curly Fox in Fort Worth. They were married in 1939. The couple was invited to be members of The Opry in the late 1930s.

== Career ==
Ruby was dubbed "radio's original cowgirl". The husky voice star was something of a cross between Sophie Tucker (whom she was often compared to) and Dale Evans and with her husband, fiddler Curly Fox was an enormously popular radio and personal appearances star in the 1940s although she failed to have any hit records. Her best-known song, "Don't Let That Man Get You Down" predated Loretta Lynn's stand-up-to-your-man hits by twenty years. This sassy persona was adopted on most of Ruby's recordings, "Ain't You Sorry That You Lied" and "You've Been Cheating on Me", songs perhaps too trailblazing to have been record hits in that very conservative era of country music. Most of Texas Ruby's recordings were done for the King Records and Columbia Records labels. Her first sessions were in Dallas for Decca Records in February, 1937.

Texas Ruby made her first breakthrough in the music industry working with country bandleader Zeke Clements but by the mid forties she and husband Fox had developed their own stage act and were much in demand, including a stint as regulars on the Grand Ole Opry from 1944 to 1948. The Foxes left the Opry and in late 1948 moved to Texas, where most of their concert dates were. The move seemed to push national stardom further away from the duo, who in the early 1960s moved first to Los Angeles (appearing on the Town Hall Party country music television series) and then back to Nashville in attempts to return to the limelight. Fox, widely considered one of country music's greatest fiddlers, worked the Opry more frequently as background instrumentalist than as a star.

On March 29, 1963, while Fox was appearing on the Opry, a fire broke out in the couple's home and Ruby was killed. It was a grim month in Opry history, as Ruby was the fifth Grand Ole Opry star to die that month, following Patsy Cline, Hawkshaw Hawkins, Cowboy Copas, and Jack Anglin. Fox was reinstated as an official Grand Ole Opry member shortly afterward but he retired by 1970.

== Personal life ==
Ruby was the sister of Tex Owens, who composed Eddy Arnold's hit "The Cattle Call."
