= Anytime =

Anytime may refer to:

- Anytime (Brian McKnight album), and the title song
- Anytime (Eddy Arnold album), 1956
- Anytime, originally Slim Whitman Sings (1962 album)
- "Anytime" (1921 song), a popular song by Herbert "Happy" Lawson
- "Anytime" (The Jets song), 1988
- "Anytime" (Koda Kumi song), 2008
- "Anytime", by McAuley Schenker Group from the album Save Yourself, 1989
- "Anytime" (Nu-Birth song), 1997
- "Anytime", by The Box Tops from Cry Like a Baby
- "Anytime", by Cheap Trick from the self-titled album
- "Anytime", by Eve 6, featured in the 2001 film Out Cold
- "Anytime", by Journey from Infinity
- "Anytime", by Kelly Clarkson from Thankful
- "Anytime", by My Morning Jacket from Z
- "Anytime", a Live with Yourself! storyline
- Anytime algorithm, in artificial intelligence
