= Curly Fox =

American musician (1910–1995)

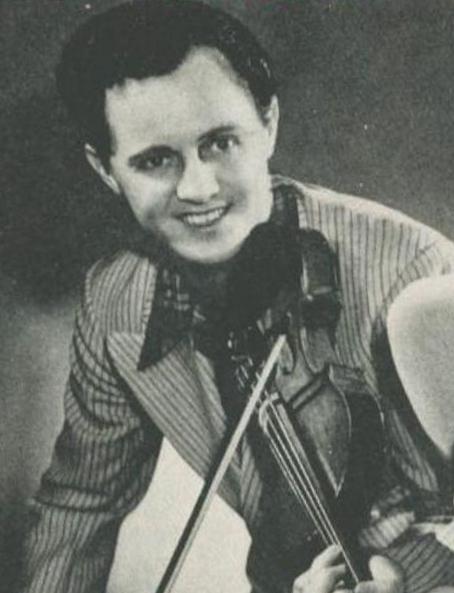

Background information
- Born: Arnim LeRoy Fox; November 9, 1910; Graysville, Tennessee, United States
- Died: November 10, 1995 (aged 85) Nashville, Tennessee, United States
- Genres: Country, Old-time music
- Occupations: Singer, musician
- Instrument: Fiddle
- Years active: 1935–1963
- Labels: Decca Records
- Formerly of: Curly and Ruby, Grand Ole Opry

Arnim LeRoy Fox (November 9, 1910 – November 10, 1995), better known as Curly (or Curley) Fox, was an American old-time and country fiddler, singer and country musician.

== Biography ==
Fox was born in Graysville, Tennessee, United States, as the son of a barber. He learned to play the fiddle with some help from his father and from James McCarroll, a member of the Roane County Ramblers. Fox first played professionally on the traveling Indian Medicine Show with Chief White Owl; later, he played with Claude Davis and the Carolina Tar Heels in Atlanta, Georgia. Fox founded the Tennessee Firecrackers in the 1930s, performing on WSB-AM in Atlanta. For a time, he worked for promoter Larry Sunbrock on his "fiddling contest" show. Sunbrock would travel around the country with his fiddlers and arrange "world championship fiddling contests" in towns along the way. Fox played with the Shelton Brothers on recordings they made for Decca Records between 1934 and 1936, in addition to recording a few of his own singles.

In 1937, Fox met singer Texas Ruby (Ruby Agnes Owens), sister of Tex Owens, while playing in Fort Worth, Texas. They married shortly thereafter in 1939, and began playing together professionally on the Grand Ole Opry, where they performed from 1937–1939 and 1944-1948. From 1940-1944, they became a regular feature on Boone County Jamboree over WLW-AM in Cincinnati, Ohio. The couple was invited to be members of The Opry in the late 1930s. They occasionally recorded together, including a session for King Records in 1947. In 1948, Curly and Ruby moved to Houston, Texas, where they remained for over a decade, working in radio and television.

In 1960, the pair returned to work on the Grand Ole Opry, but Ruby often fell ill and Fox frequently performed solo. An album was recorded together for Starday Records in 1963, but 72 hours after the recording sessions, Ruby died in a mobile home fire. After her death, Fox played solo for several years, but eventually moved to Chicago to live with family. Though he ailed in his old age, he sporadically performed live; he returned to Graysville in the mid-1970s, performing with a local bluegrass outfit before retiring.

Curly Fox died in November 1995, at the age of 85.
