= Cattle Call (album) =

Studio album by Eddy Arnold
- Released: 1963
- Genre: Western
- Label: RCA Victor
- Producer: Chet Atkins

Eddy Arnold chronology
Our Man Down South (1963)	Cattle Call (1963)	Country Songs I Love to Sing (compilation) (1963)

Cattle Call is an album by American country music singer Eddy Arnold, released by RCA Victor in August 1963. The album features a number of western standards, as well as a new recording of "The Cattle Call", which was a chart-topping hit for Arnold in 1955. "(Jim) I Wore a Tie Today" had also previously been released as a single. Produced by Chet Atkins, Cattle Call was Arnold's first album to make Billboard's album charts.

== Track listing ==
1. "The Streets of Laredo" (Traditional) (3:09)
2. "Cool Water" (Bob Nolan) (3:40)
3. "Cattle Call" (Tex Owens) (2:46)
4. "Leanin' on the Old Top Rail" (Charles Kenny, Nick Kenny) (2:10)
5. "Ole Faithful" (Michael Carr, Jimmy Kennedy) (1:54)
6. "A Cowboy's Dream" (Traditional) (3:30)
7. "The Wayward Wind" (Stanley Lebowsky, Herb Newman) (3:11)
8. "Tumbling Tumbleweeds" (Bob Nolan) (2:41)
9. "Cowpoke" (Stan Jones) (2:23)
10. "Where the Mountains Meet the Sky" (Sammy Kaye) (1:59)
11. "Sierra Sue" (Joseph Buell Carey) (2:44)
12. "Carry Me Back to the Lone Prairie" (Carson Robison) (2:20)
13. "(Jim) I Wore a Tie Today" (Cindy Walker) (2:39)

== Charts ==
Chart (1963)	Peak position
US Billboard Top LPs	131
