= Why Say Goodbye =

Single by Connie Francis
- B-side: "Addio Mi 'Amore"
- Released: March 1968
- Genre: Pop, ballad
- Length: 2:25
- Label: MGM; K13923
- Songwriters: Larry Kusik, Eddie Snyder and Pierre Cour
- Composer: Andre Popp
- Producers: Bob Morgan and Herb Bernstein

Connie Francis singles chronology
"My World Is Slipping Away" (1967)	"Why Say Goodbye" (1968)	"Somebody Else Is Taking My Place" (1968)

Music video
- "Why Say Goodbye, Promo Film" on YouTube

Alternative cover
- Italian single release cover, MGM Records

"Why Say Goodbye" is a song in the style of a ballad composed by Andre Popp and written by Larry Kusik and Eddie Snyder and most notably performed by Connie Francis, who released it as a single in early 1968 under MGM Records. The single saw her return to the singles charts.

== Connie Francis version ==
=== Background ===
Before "Why Say Goodbye", "My World Is Slipping Away" had become Francis' third 1960s A-side to not break into or bubble under the Billboard Hot 100, only reaching No. 35 on the Billboard Easy Listening, chart dated February 10, 1968. The single followed a period of declining chart performance for Francis. Following that MGM Records scheduled another recording session, with "Why Say Goodbye" being produced by Bob Morgan and Herb Bernstein, and arranged by the latter. "Addio Mi 'Amore" was also produced by Bob Morgan, but arranged and conducted by Ernie Freeman. At first the French lyrics were written by Pierre Cour, (with the song titled A Comme Amour), but Francis recorded the English version written by Larry Kusik and Eddie Snyder.

=== Release and reception ===
"Why Say Goodbye" was released as a seven-inch single in March 1968 by MGM Records. It was backed by an Italian song, "Addio Mi 'Amore" on the B-side, which was later included in her The Italian Collection compilation album, released years later. The single was advertised as her "most powerful ballad". Focus was also put on the fact that the song's composer was André Popp, who composed the hit song "Love Is Blue".

The single received a positive critical response upon its release. Record World called the single a "Powerful New Ballad" in its "Money Music" section, noting that Popp composed it. Cashbox reviewed the single in late March and said that "Beautiful ballad from the composer of 'Love Is Blue' gives the Connie Francis a grand vehicle for bright return to the winner’s circle. Stunningly handled for exposure on pop and easy listening formats, the side is a showcase of the soft and powerful vocal strength of the artist." The magazine concluded: "Anticipate a very good response for the track."

=== Chart performance ===
"Why Say Goodbye" debuted at No. 32 on the Bubbling Under Hot 100 chart, dropping out the next week. The single reached No. 3 on the Cashbox Looking Ahead, and peaked at No. 5 on the Record World Up-Coming Singles chart. The single debuted on the Billboard Easy Listening in the issue dated April 20, 1968, peaking at No. 27 during a five-week run on the chart. The single debuted on the Record World Top Non-Rock in the issue dated April 27, 1968 at No. 38, peaking at No. 23 also during a five-week run on the chart. Outside of America the single didn't sell well, and like her previous singles didn't chart in foreign countries.

=== Track listing ===
7" vinyl single

- "Why Say Goodbye" - 2:25
- "Addio, Mi' Amore" – 2:17

=== Foreign releases ===
Both songs were recorded in other languages like Italian, French, Spanish, German and Japanese and released soon after as singles with MGM hoping to see foreign success. The translated versions that were released as singles were:

- Por qué decir adiós? (Spanish)
- Non dirlo mai (Italian)
- Du sagst Goodbye (German)

== Charts ==
Chart peaks for "Why Say Goodbye" by Francis
Chart (1968)	Peak position
US Billboard Bubbling Under Hot 100	32
US Billboard Easy Listening	27
US Record World Top Non-Rock	23
US Record World Up-Coming Singles	5
US Cashbox Looking Ahead	3
