= My World Is Slipping Away =

- German release cover

Single by Connie Francis
- B-side: "Till We're Together"
- Released: December 1967
- Recorded: November 15, 1967, Hollywood, California
- Genre: Pop; Country
- Length: 2:47
- Label: MGM; K13876
- Songwriters: Neil Sedaka; Howard Greenfield
- Producer: Bob Morgan

Connie Francis singles chronology
"Lonely Again" (1967)	"My World Is Slipping Away" (1967)	"Why Say Goodbye" (1968)

Professional ratings
Review scores
Source	Rating
Record Mirror	3/5 stars
Cashbox	Positive (Pick of the Week)
Record World	Positive

"My World Is Slipping Away" is a song written by Neil Sedaka and Howard Greenfield and most notably performed by Connie Francis, who released it as a single in late 1967. The single saw her continue recording with producer Bob Morgan and return to songwriter Neil Sedaka.

== Connie Francis version ==
=== Background ===
By 1967, Francis only scored minor hits, and the main chart she had success with was the Adult Contemporary chart. The new single followed a period of declining chart performance for Francis, so she partnered up with producer Bob Morgan once again again and the writer of her 1958 No. 1 hit Stupid Cupid, Neil Sedaka. "My World Is Slipping Away" was the last of five singles that she released that year. It was produced only by Bob Morgan and arranged by Joe Mazzu on the B-side.

=== Release and reception ===
"My World Is Slipping Away" was released as a seven-inch single in December 1967 by MGM Records. It was backed by another mid-tempo ballad, "Till We're Together" on the B-side, which never saw an album inclusion. The single was advertised as the "first great hit of 1968".

The single received a positive critical reception upon its release. Record World said that "The new Connie Francis puts her back in her old C&W-pop bag, 'My World is Slipping Away'". Cashbox reviewed the single in the late December and stated, "Slipping back into her familiar ballad stylings, Connie Francis should make a solid showing with this lightly country-tinged side that shows her in the old form that brought her many followers. The pretty material takes on shimmering beauty from the songstress’ attractive styling". The publication noted that it "looks like a strong pop-good sales item."

In the United Kingdom Record Mirror would award the single three out of five stars and stated that "Still a great stylist, Connie now tackles a double-tracked mid-tempo ballad", describing it as "sad". They believed that it's "probably another miss."

=== Chart performance ===
"My World Is Slipping Away" debuted on Billboard magazine's Easy Listening chart on February 10, 1968, peaking at No. 35 during a three-week run on the chart. The single debuted on the Record World Top Non-Rock chart on February 17, 1968, at number 33, peaking at number 29 the next week and dropping out completely by March.

=== Track listing ===
7" vinyl single

- "My World Is Slipping Away" - 2:47
- "Till We're Together" – 2:24

== Charts ==
Chart performance for "My World Is Slipping Away" by Francis
Chart (1968)	Peak position
US Billboard Easy Listening	35
US Record World Top Non-Rock	29
