= Thereby Hangs a Tale =

Studio album by Eddy Arnold
- Released: 1959
- Genre: Country
- Label: RCA Victor
- Producer: Chet Atkins

Eddy Arnold chronology
That's How Much I Love You (compilation) (1959)	Thereby Hangs a Tale (1959)	Have Guitar, Will Travel (1959)

Thereby Hangs a Tale is an album by American country music singer Eddy Arnold. It was released in 1959 by RCA Victor (catalog no. LSP-2036). The album consists of 12 story songs.

AllMusic gave the album a rating of four stars. The decision to dedicate a whole album to story songs was inspired by the success of Johnny Horton's "The Battle of New Orleans". Reviewer Greg Adams called it one of Arnold's most interesting albums, praised him for taking a "far more subdued" approach that gave the material "a folk flavor."

== Track listing ==
Side A

1. "Tom Dooley"
2. "Nellie Sits A-Waitin'"
3. "Tennessee Stud"
4. "The Battle of Little Big Horn"
5. "The Wreck of the Old '97"

Side B

1. "Johnny Reb, That's Me"
2. "Riders in the Sky"
3. "Boot Hill"
4. "Ballad of Davy Crockett"
5. "Partners"
6. "Jesse James"
