= Jean Chapel =

American singer-songwriter

- Also known as: Mattie O'Neil; The Female Elvis
- Born: Opal Jean Amburgey; March 6, 1925; Fleming-Neon, Kentucky, US
- Died: August 12, 1995 (aged 70) Port Orange, Florida, US
- Genres: Country
- Occupations: Singer, songwriter

Opal Jean Amburgey (March 6, 1925 – August 12, 1995), known professionally as Jean Chapel, was an American country singer and songwriter. She recorded for several record labels and wrote over 400 songs, more than 170 of which were published in her lifetime.

== Biography ==
Amburgey was born into a family of six children in Neon, Kentucky. At the age of 11, she learned guitar and banjo, and performed with her sisters as the Sunshine Sister band. Together, they left home when Jean was 13 and were hired to play daily on WKLP-AM in Lexington, Kentucky, in 1938. They moved to Atlanta, Georgia, in 1940 to sing on WSB Barn Dance; she began using the nickname Mattie at this time. Her sister Irene would later record with Capitol Records under the name Martha Carson.

In 1947, she married Salty Holmes, and in 1950 they moved to Chicago, Illinois, to appear on National Barn Dance on WLS-AM. Soon Jean began appearing on the Grand Ole Opry opposite Holmes as Mattie & Salty under the name Mattie O'Neil.

In 1956, she recorded a few rockabilly recordings under the name Jean Chapel with Sun Records; Sun promoted her as the Female Elvis, but the nickname stuck more successfully to Janis Martin.

After Chapel divorced Holmes in 1956, she moved to Nashville and devoted herself primarily to songwriting. She befriended Tammy Wynette, who would later briefly marry her brother, Don (shortly before her marriage to George Jones). Wynette asked her to record the duet "Crazy Me".

Chapel's greatest success in the music industry was as a songwriter, penning "Lonely Again", a number one song for Eddy Arnold. Chapel also wrote “Baby, That's Living”, which went number two in the U.S. She also wrote "Lay Some Happiness on Me", one of Dean Martin's most successful records of the 1960s and in 1973 her song "To Get to You", a hit for Jerry Wallace, was nominated for Song of the Year by the Country Music Association. Among the other artists to record Chapel songs are Liz Anderson, Nancy Sinatra, Tommy Overstreet, Charlie McCoy, and Lorrie Morgan.

Chapel died August 12, 1995, in Port Orange, Florida.

== Discography ==
Year	Title	Record label
1954	Tennessee Courtin' Time / That Does It	Hickory
1955	You Gave Me Your Name / Part Of Your Heart	Hickory
1956	Welcome To The Club / I Won't be Rockin' Tonight	Sun
1956	Welcome To The Club / I Won't Be Rockin' Tonight	RCA
1957	Oo-Ba La Baby / I Had A Dream	RCA
1959	The Little Martian / Waiting	Cleff-Tone
1962	It Hurts Me / Turn Around And Walk Away	Crest
1963	Don't Let Go / Your Tender Love	Smash
1966	Tell It Like It Is	not issued
