= Somebody Like Me (Eddy Arnold song) =

Single by Eddy Arnold

from the album Somebody Like Me
- B-side: "Taking Chances"
- Released: September 1966
- Genre: Country
- Length: 2:25
- Label: RCA Victor
- Songwriter: Wayne Carson
- Producer: Chet Atkins

Eddy Arnold singles chronology
"The Tip of My Fingers" (1966)	"Somebody Like Me" (1966)	"The First Word" (1966)

"Somebody Like Me" is a 1966 single by Eddy Arnold. "Somebody Like Me" was a number one country song spending four weeks at the top spot and a total of eighteen weeks on the chart.

== Chart performance ==
Chart (1966)	Peak position
U.S. Billboard Hot Country Singles chart	1
U.S. Billboard Hot 100	53
U.S. Billboard Easy Listening chart	15
Canadian RPM Top Singles	54
