= The Easy Way (Eddy Arnold album) =

Studio album by Eddy Arnold
- Released: 1965
- Genre: Country
- Label: RCA Victor
- Producer: Chet Atkins

Eddy Arnold chronology
Pop Hits from the Country Side (1964)	The Easy Way (1965)	I'm Throwing Rice... (compilation) (1965)

The Easy Way is an album by American country music singer Eddy Arnold. It was released by RCA Victor in 1965.

The album debuted on Billboard magazine's Top Country Albums chart on June 19, 1965, spent two weeks at No. 1, and remained on the chart for a total of 19 weeks.

AllMusic gave the album a rating of four stars. Reviewer Greg Adams called it "one of the most invigorating and enjoyable of his mid-'60s LPs."

== Track listing ==
Side A

1. "Bad News"
2. "Tell 'Em Where You Got Your Blues"
3. "We'll Sing in the Sunshine"
4. "It's My Pleasure"
5. "Taking a Chance on Love"
6. "Baby I've Got It"

Side B

1. "Understand Your Man"
2. "My Heart's Not Made That Way"
3. "He'll Have to Go"
4. "The Easy Way"
5. "I've Been to Town"
6. "What-cha Gonna Do"
