= Anytime (Eddy Arnold album) =

Compilation album by Eddy Arnold
- Released: 1956
- Genre: Country
- Label: RCA Victor

Eddy Arnold chronology
Wanderin' with Eddy Arnold (1955)	Anytime (1956)	The Chapel on the Hill (1956)

Anytime is an album by American country music singer Eddy Arnold. It was released in 1956 by RCA Victor. With the advent of long-playing albums, RCA reissued an expanded version of Arnold's 1952 two-record set. The album collects 12 of Arnold's hit from his early years, including seven records that were number one hits.

AllMusic gave the album a rating of four-and-a-half stars.

== Track listing ==
Side A

1. "Bouquet of Roses"
2. "It's a Sin"
3. "That's How Much I Love You"
4. "Don't Rob Another Man's Castle"
5. "Rockin' Alone (In a Rocking Chair)"
6. "Molly Darling"

Side B

1. "I'll Hold You in My Heart (Till I Can Hold You in My Arms)"
2. "A Heart Full of Love (For a Handful of Kisses)"
3. "Anytime"
4. "Texarkana Baby"
5. "Will the Circle Be Unbroken?"
6. "Who at My Door Is Standing"
