= Walkin' in Love Land =

Studio album by Eddy Arnold
- Released: 1968
- Studio: RCA Victor, Nashville
- Genre: Country
- Label: RCA Victor
- Producer: Chet Atkins

Eddy Arnold chronology
The Romantic World of Eddy Arnold (1968)	Walkin' in Love Land (1968)	Songs of the Young World (1969)

Walkin' in Love Land is a studio album by country music singer Eddy Arnold. It was released in 1968 by RCA Victor.

== Overview ==
The album debuted on Billboard magazine's Top Country Albums chart on October 26, 1968, peaked at No. 2, and remained on the chart for a total of 26 weeks. It also peaked at No. 70 on the Billboard Top LPs during a thirteen-week stay on the chart. The album included the No. 1 hit, "Then You Can Tell Me Goodbye". It was Arnold's last album to rank in the Top 10 country albums.

AllMusic gave the album a rating of two-and-a-half stars.

== Track listing ==
Side A

1. "Walkin' in Love Land" (Hughes, Vernon)
2. "Then You Can Tell Me Goodbye" (Loudermilk)
3. "The Summer Wind" (Bradtke, Mayer, Mercer)
4. "My Dream" (Hughes, Vernon)
5. "I'll Never Smile Again" (Lowe)
6. "Apples, Raisins and Roses" (Shuman, Carr)

Side B

1. "Until It's Time for You to Go" (Sainte-Marie)
2. "Turn Around, Look at Me" (Jerry Capehart)
3. "All I Have to Do Is Dream" (Boudleaux & Felice Bryant)
4. "Little Girls and Little Boys" (Tubert)
5. "Just Across the Mountain" (Kent, Mercer)
6. "The Olive Tree" (Lampert, Springfield)

== Charts ==
Chart (1968)	Peak position
US Top Country Albums	2
US Billboard Top LPs	70
