= So Many Ways/If the Whole World Stopped Lovin' =

So Many Ways/If the Whole World Stopped Lovin’

Studio album by Eddy Arnold
- Released: 1973
- Recorded: 1972/73
- Genre: Country
- Label: MGM
- Producer: Mike Curb, Don Costa

Eddy Arnold chronology
Eddy Arnold Sings for Housewives and Other Lovers (1972)	So Many Ways/If the Whole World Stopped Lovin’ (1973)	She’s Got Everything I Need (1973)

So Many Ways/If the Whole World Stopped Lovin’ is an album by American country singer Eddy Arnold, released in 1973 on the MGM Records label. The album reached #32 in the US Country chart. Two singles from the album charted, “So Many Ways” which reached #28 in the US country chart and #15 in the Canadian country chart, and “If the Whole World Stopped Lovin’" which reached #56 and #76 in the US and Canadian country charts respectively.

== Track listing ==
1. "So Many Ways" (Bobby Stevenson) – 2:50
2. "Some Sunday Morning" (M.K. Jerome, Ray Heindorf, Ted Koehler) – 2:58
3. "Only You (And You Alone)" (Buck Ram, Ande Rand) – 2:28
4. "Once in a While" (Michael Edwards, Bud Green) – 2:50
5. "Among My Souvenirs" (Edgar Leslie, Horatio Nicholls) – 3:09
6. "If the Whole World Stopped Lovin’" (Ben Peters) – 2:33
7. "My Special Angel" (Jimmy Duncan) – 2:42
8. "At the End of a Long Long Day" (Johnny Marvin, Billy Moll) – 2:20
9. "I Almost Lost My Mind" (Ivory Joe Hunter) – 2:06
10. "My Son I Wish You Everything" (Clyde Otis, Lou Stallman) – 3:17

== Production ==
- Produced by: Mike Curb, Don Costa
- Arranged by: Don Costa, Bob Summers
- Background vocals: The Mike Curb Congregation
