= The Romantic World of Eddy Arnold =

Studio album by Eddy Arnold
- Released: 1968
- Studio: RCA Victor, Nashville
- Genre: Country
- Label: RCA Victor
- Producer: Chet Atkins

Eddy Arnold chronology
The Everlovin' World of Eddy Arnold (1968)	The Romantic World of Eddy Arnold (1968)	Walkin' in Love Land (1968)

The Romantic World of Eddy Arnold is a studio album by country music singer Eddy Arnold. It was released in 1968 by RCA Victor.

== Overview ==
The album debuted on Billboard magazine's Top Country Albums chart on June 8, 1968, peaked at No. 2, and remained on the chart for a total of 38 weeks. It also peaked at No. 56 on the Billboard Top LPs during a thirty two-week stay on the chart. The album included the No. 4 hit, "It's Over".

AllMusic gave the album a rating of two stars.

== Track listing ==
Side A

1. "It's Over" (Rodgers)
2. "By the Time I Get to Phoenix" (Webb)
3. "What Now My Love" (Sigman, Becaud, Delanoe)
4. "Can't Take My Eyes Off You" (Crewe, Gaudio)
5. "Am I That Easy to Forget" (Belew, Stevenson)
6. "What a Wonderful World" (Douglas, Weiss)

Side B

1. "Honey" (Russell)
2. "No Matter Whose Baby You Are" (Chapel)
3. "Gentle on My Mind" (Hartford)
4. "From This Minute On" (Peters)
5. "Evergreen" (Belew, Givens)
6. "I Really Go for You" (Chapel)

== Charts ==
Chart (1968)	Peak position
US Top Country Albums	2
US Billboard Top LPs	55
