= Each Minute Seems a Million Years =

Single by Eddy Arnold
- B-side: The Cattle Call
- Released: May 14, 1945
- Recorded: December 4, 1944
- Studio: WSM Radio Station Studio, Nashville, TN
- Genre: Hillbilly-Country
- Label: Bluebird 33-0527
- Songwriter: Alton "Cook" Watson

"Each Minute Seems a Million Years" is a country music song written by Alton "Cook" Watson and sung by Eddy Arnold, billed as "Eddy Arnold, The Tennessee Plowboy and His Guitar". It was released in 1945 on the RCA Victor label (catalog no. 20-2067-A) with "You Must Walk the Line" as the "B" side. In debuted on the Billboard folk chart on June 30, 1945 and peaked at No. 5. It was the first of 128 hit singles for Arnold.
