= The Everlovin' World of Eddy Arnold =

Studio album by Eddy Arnold
- Released: 1968
- Studio: RCA Victor, Nashville
- Genre: MOR Pop
- Label: RCA Victor
- Producer: Chet Atkins

Eddy Arnold chronology
| Turn the World Around (1967) | The Everlovin' World of Eddy Arnold (1968) | The Romantic World of Eddy Arnold (1968) |

Professional ratings
Review scores
| Source | Rating |
|---|---|
| Allmusic | 2/5 stars |

The Everlovin' World of Eddy Arnold is an album by country vocalist Eddy Arnold.

== Chart performance ==
The album debuted on Billboard magazine's Top Country Albums chart on February 3, 1968, held the No. 1 spot for four weeks, and remained on the chart for a total of 33 weeks. It was Arnold's ninth consecutive album to reach No. 1 on the Top Country Albums. The album also charted on the Billboard Top LPs, peaking at No. 122 during a twenty one-week stay on the chart.

== Track listing ==
1. "All the Time" (Mel Tillis, Wayne Walker) (2:47)
2. "In the Misty Moonlight" (Cindy Walker) (2:04)
3. "There You Go" (Audrey Allison) (2:32)
4. "A Song for Shara" (Demetrius Tapp, Bob Tubert) (2:26)
5. "Sunny" (Bobby Hebb) (2:35)
6. "Dear Heart" (Jay Livingston, Ray Evans, Henry Mancini) (2:45) (From the Warner Brothers 1964 film Dear Heart)
7. "How Is She?" (Marijohn Wilkin) (2:13)
8. "Here Comes Heaven" (Joy Byers, Bob Tubert) (2:14)
9. "The World I Used to Know" (Rod McKuen) (3:05)
10. "Secret Love" (Paul Francis Webster, Sammy Fain) (2:50)
11. "Baby That's Living" (Jean Chapel) (2:30)
12. "Nothing but Time" (Charlie Williams, Jill Jones) (2:45)

== Personnel ==
- Jim Malloy - engineer
- Bill Walker - arranger, conductor

== Charts ==
| Chart (1968) | Peak position |
|---|---|
| US Top Country Albums | 1 |
| US Billboard Top LPs | 122 |
