= Folk Song Book =

Studio album by Eddy Arnold
- Released: 1964
- Genre: Country
- Label: RCA Victor

Eddy Arnold chronology
| Faithfully Yours (1963) | Folk Song Book (1964) | Eddy's Songs (compilation) (1964) |

Folk Song Book is an album by American country music singer Eddy Arnold, with backing vocals by The Needmore Creek Singers. It was released by RCA Victor in 1964.

The album debuted on Billboard magazine's Top Country Albums chart on March 14, 1964, peaked at No. 4, and remained on the chart for a total of 24 weeks.

AllMusic gave the album a rating of three stars.

== Track listing ==
Side A

1. "Time's A-Gettin' Hard"
2. "The Young Land"
3. "Green, Green"
4. "Molly"
5. "Gotta Travel On"
6. "The Song of the Coo Coo"

Side B

1. "Poor Howard"
2. "Blowin' in the Wind" (Bob Dylan)
3. "Jeff Canady"
4. "Where Have All the Flowers Gone?" (Pete Seeger)
5. "The Folk Singer"
6. "Cotton Fields" (Lead Belly)
