= One More Time (Eddy Arnold album) =

Studio album by Eddy Arnold
- Released: April 1962
- Genre: Country
- Label: RCA Victor

Eddy Arnold chronology
Let's Make Memories Tonight (compilation) (1961)	One More Time (1962)	Christmas with Eddy Arnold (1962)

Professional ratings
Review scores
Source	Rating
AllMusic	4/5 stars
The Encyclopedia of Popular Music	4/5 stars
The Rolling Stone Album Guide	3/5 stars

One More Time is an album by American country music singer Eddy Arnold, released in April 1962 by RCA Victor. The album is a "collection of songs he made famous the first time around."

== Critical reception ==
The Rolling Stone Album Guide called the album "a set of personable mood music with bluesier intent than most of the artist's recordings," writing that it "shows the singer at his soothing best."

== Track listing ==
Side A

1. "One Grain of Sand" [2:38]
2. "That Do Make It Nice" (Eddy Arnold, Fred Ebb, P. Klein) [2:06]
3. "The Kentuckian Song" (Irving Gordon) [2:30]
4. "This Is the Thanks I Get (For Loving You)" (Thomas Dilbeck) [2:00]
5. "What a Fool I Was" (Stu Davis) [2:32]
6. "Just Out of Reach (Of My Two Open Arms)" (Virgil F. Stewart) [2:39]

Side B

1. "The Richest Man (In the World)" [2:39]
2. "I'm Throwing Rice (At The Girl That I Love)" (Eddy Arnold, Steve Nelson) [2:15]
3. "Then I Turned and Walked Slowly Away" (Red Fortner) [2:42]
4. "Just Call Me Lonesome" (Rex Griffin) [2:21]
5. "I'd Trade All of My Tomorrows (For Just One Yesterday)" (Jenny Carson) [2:10]
6. "Don't Rob Another Man's Castle" (Jenny Carson) [2:35]
