= Lonely Again =

1967 country song taken to No. 1 by Eddy Arnold

- German release cover

Single by Eddy Arnold

from the album Lonely Again
- B-side: "Love on My Mind"
- Released: January 1967
- Genre: Country-Pop
- Length: 2:40
- Label: RCA Victor; 47-9080
- Songwriter: Jean Chapel
- Producer: Chet Atkins

Eddy Arnold singles chronology
"The First Word" (1966)	"Lonely Again" (1967)	"Misty Blue" (1967)

"Lonely Again"
- A-side of the single

Single by Connie Francis

from the album My Heart Cries for You
- B-side: "When You Care A Lot For Someone"
- Released: September 1967
- Recorded: Mid 1967
- Genre: Pop; Country
- Length: 2:58
- Label: MGM; K 13814
- Songwriter: Jean Chapel
- Producer: Bob Morgan

Connie Francis singles chronology
"My Heart Cries for You" (1967)	"Lonely Again" (1967)	"My World Is Slipping Away" (1967)

"Lonely Again" is a 1967 song written by Jean Chapel. "Lonely Again" became a number-one country hit for Eddy Arnold while also charting on the easy listening and non-rock charts via Connie Francis.

== Eddy Arnold version ==
=== Release and reception ===
"Lonely Again" was released as a seven-inch single in January 1967 by RCA Victor Records. It was backed by another country themed song, "Love on My Mind" on the B-side, which never saw an album inclusion. The single was advertised as a "great new hit ballad".

The single received positive reviews upon its release. Cashbox reviewed the single in late January and stated that Eddy Arnold "is currently enjoying the hottest streak of his career and threatens to continue burning up the track with 'Lonely Again.' Once again, big pop-country action looms as the songster delivers a lovely, bittersweet ballad with sure artistry." The publication also described the B-side, “Love on My Mind,” as a "happy-go-lucky charmer." Record World shortly said that "Arnold with strings and a very pretty ballad means big country sales and most likely big pop sales."

=== Chart performance ===
"Lonely Again" went to number one on the country charts for two weeks and spent a total of fifteen weeks on the Billboard Hot Country Singles chart. The song also saw much success on the Billboard Easy Listening chart, where it peaked at No. 11, and had success on the pop charts too, peaking at No. 87 on the Billboard Hot 100.

== Connie Francis version ==
=== Background ===
By late 1967 Francis only scored minor hits, and the main chart she had success with, was the Adult Contemporary chart. The new single followed a period of declining chart performance for Francis, so she partnered up with producer Bob Morgan once again, and for the B-side with writers Benny Davis and Murray Mencher, who wrote her 1962 No. 1 hit Don't Break the Heart That Loves You. "Lonely Again" was the second-to-last of five singles that she released that year. It was produced only by Bob Morgan, and arranged by Herb Bernstein on the A-side and Joe Mazzu on the B-side.

=== Release and reception ===
"Lonely Again" was released as a seven-inch single in September 1967 by MGM Records. It was backed by another ballad-country themed song, "When You Care A Lot For Someone" on the B-side, which never saw an album inclusion.

The single was given a positive critical response following its release as well; Record World said that "Connie Francis takes the attractive country tune, 'Lonely Again', and turns it into a silken torchant for widespread sales". Cashbox reviewed the single in the late September and stated "Intriguing melody line and the powerful belting vocal session that Connie Francis pours on in this reading of 'Lonely Again' should take hold of the pop market with added sales impetus imparted from good music outlets." The magazine also said that the "chanteuse’s showing will put her back on top. Enticing ballad flip also."

=== Chart performance ===
"Lonely Again" debuted on Billboard magazine's Easy Listening chart on October 14, 1967, peaking at No. 22 during a seven-week run on the chart. The single debuted on the Record World Top Non-Rock chart on October 21, 1967 at No. 38, peaking at No. 21 on November 25.

=== Track listing ===
7" vinyl single

- "Lonely Again" – 2:58
- "When You Care A Lot For Someone" – 2:05

== Other cover versions ==
- Nancy Sinatra recorded the song for her 1967 album Country, My Way, which reached the US top 50.

== Charts ==
Chart performance for "Lonely Again" by Eddy Arnold
Chart (1967)	Peak position
U.S. Billboard Hot Country Singles	1
U.S. Billboard Easy Listening	11
U.S. Billboard Hot 100	87

Chart performance for "Lonely Again" by Connie Francis
Chart (1967)	Peak position
US Billboard Easy Listening	22
US Record World Top Non-Rock	21
