= Wanderin' with Eddy Arnold =

Studio album by Eddy Arnold
- Released: 1955
- Genre: Country
- Label: RCA Victor
- Producer: Steve Sholes

Eddy Arnold chronology
To Mother (1950)	Wanderin' with Eddy Arnold (1955)	Anytime (compilation) (1956)

Wanderin' with Eddy Arnold is an album by American country music singer Eddy Arnold. It was released in 1955 by RCA Victor (catalog no. LPM-1111). The album consists of Arnold singing American folk songs.

At the time of its release, syndicated music critic Donald Kirkley called it "a very beautiful thing" and concluded: "Mr. Arnold has a full perception of the meaning of these simple, deeply moving traditional things; he is tender and gentle, boisterous or gay as the story requires. With this one recording, he could lay claim to being one of the great modern minstrels."

Another reviewer praised Arnold's performance and called it a pleasant surprise.

AllMusic gave the album a rating of four-and-a-half stars. Reviewer Greg Adams called it "one of Arnold's best LPs, featuring his exquisite baritone in an appealingly spare commercial folk setting (acoustic guitar, strings, vocal chorus) in which the pop elements are subdued enough to be inoffensive."

== Track listing ==
Side A

1. "Wanderin'" (arranged by Charles Grean)
2. "The Rovin' Gambler"
3. "The Lonesome Road (Gene Austin, Nathaniel Shilkret)
4. "Down in the Valley"
5. "Barbara Allen"
6. "On Top of Old Smokey" (arranged by Charles Grean)
7. "I Gave My Love a Cherry"

Side B

1. "The Wayfaring Stranger"
2. "Across the Wide Missouri" (Ervin Drake, Jimmy Shirl)
3. "Careless Love"
4. "Red River Valley"
5. "Sometimes I Feel Like a Motherless Child"
6. "Sweet Betsy from Pike" (Charles Grean)
7. "Home on the Range"
