= Somebody Like Me (album) =

Studio album by Eddy Arnold
- Released: 1966
- Genre: Country
- Label: RCA Victor

Eddy Arnold chronology
The Last Word in Lonesome (1966)	Somebody Like Me (1966)	Lonely Again (1967)

Somebody Like Me is an album by American country music singer Eddy Arnold. It was released by RCA Victor in 1966.

== Chart performance ==
The album debuted on Billboard magazine's Top Country Albums chart on December 24, 1966, spent two weeks at No. 1, and remained on the chart for a total of 36 weeks. On the Billboard Top LPs it peaked at No. 36 during a thirty week-stay on the chart. The album included two hit singles: "Somebody Like Me" (No. 1) and "The Tip of My Fingers" (No. 3).

== Reception ==
AllMusic gave the album a rating of two stars. Reviewer Greg Adams called it "one of the blandest middle-of-the-road pop records Eddy Arnold made in the '60s, [and] also one of his most commercially successful."

== Track listing ==
Side A

1. "Somebody Like Me" (Wayne Carson)
2. "Lay Some Happiness on Me"
3. "There's Always Me"
4. "Come By Me Nice and Slow"
5. "You Made Up for Everything"
6. "At Sunset"

Side B

1. "The Tip of My Fingers" (Bill Anderson)
2. "Love on My Mind"
3. "I Love You Drops"
4. "Don't Laugh at My Love"
5. "Ev'ry Step of the Way"
6. "It's Only Love"

== Charts ==
Chart (1966)	Peak position
US Top Country Albums	1
US Billboard Top LPs	36
