= The Last Word in Lonesome =

Studio album by Eddy Arnold
- Released: 1966
- Genre: Country
- Length: 27:53
- Label: RCA Victor
- Producer: Chet Atkins

Eddy Arnold chronology
I Want to Go with You (1966)	The Last Word in Lonesome (1966)	Somebody Like Me (1966)

The Last Word in Lonesome is an album by American country music singer Eddy Arnold. It was released by RCA Victor in 1966. The music was arranged and conducted by Bill Walker. Chet Atkins was the producer.

== Chart performance ==
The album debuted on Billboard magazine's Top Country Albums chart on July 30, 1966, peaked at No. 1, and remained on the chart for a total of 26 weeks. On the Billboard Top LPs it peaked at No. 46 during a twenty two-week stay on the chart. The album debuted on Cashbox magazine's Top 100 Albums chart in the issue dated August 13, 1966, peaking at No. 62 during a seven-week run on the chart.

== Reception ==
In the UK Melody Maker said that it's a "lightweight album from Eddy Arnold, an artist who walks the thin line between pop and country and never seems to slip completely down into either." Continuing "Here he sings mainly sadly romantic songs in various tempos; simple arrangements vocally and instrumental with an irritating cooing vocal group at times." The magazine believed that "Misty Blue" is the best track, and also noted other ones like "After the Laughter" and "Lonesome Is Me".

AllMusic gave the album a rating of three stars. Reviewer Greg Adams wrote: "If country music was moving uptown in the '60s, The Last Word in Lonesome saw it comfortably ensconced in a Manhattan penthouse, sipping champagne and bragging about its golf scores."

== Track listing ==
Side A
No.	Title	Writer(s)	Length
1.	"Misty Blue"	Bob Montgomery	2:06
2.	"Here Comes My Baby"	Bill West; Dottie West	1:52
3.	"Why"	Cindy Walker	2:18
4.	"Long, Long Friendship"	Cindy Walker	2:02
5.	"That's a Lie"	Charlie Williams; Scott Turner	2:14
6.	"A Thing Called Sadness"	Edward Charles Howard	2:35
Total length:			13:07

Side B
No.	Title	Writer(s)	Length
1.	"The Last Word in Lonesome Is Me"	Roger Miller	2:09
2.	"Don't Touch Me"	Eddie Cochran	2:39
3.	"The Other Side of Lonely"	Bobby Sykes; Wayne P. Walker	2:37
4.	"My Home Town Sweetheart"	Arthur Kent; Sylvia Dee	2:13
5.	"Millions of Roses"	Arthur Kent; Sylvia Dee	2:23
6.	"After the Laughter (Comes the Tears)"	Ray Griff	2:45
Total length:			14:46

== Charts ==
Chart (1966)	Peak position
US Billboard Top Country LPs	1
US Billboard Top LPs	46
US Cashbox Top 100 Albums	62
