= Have Guitar, Will Travel (Eddy Arnold album) =

Studio album by Eddy Arnold
- Released: 1959
- Genre: Country
- Label: RCA Victor

Eddy Arnold chronology
Thereby Hangs a Tale (1959)	Have Guitar, Will Travel (1959)	Eddy Arnold Sings Them Again (compilation) (1960)

Have Guitar, Will Travel is an album by American country music singer Eddy Arnold. It was released in 1959 by RCA Victor (catalog no. LPM-1928). The album consists of 12 tracks, each referencing a different state or city.

At the time of its release, Roger Thames wrote that Arnold's performance "demonstrates again that he is a few cuts above the average ... this is the kind of song he does best, and he's at his best singing them."

Another reviewer wrote that "Arnold's nasal tones sound so sincere in each song it seems like he's plugging his home state in each one."

The album also received a positive review from Wally George in the Los Angeles Times. George praised Arnold's signing and guitar playing and concluded: "Verdict: Have record, will listen."

AllMusic gave the album a rating of two stars. Reviewer Stephen Thomas Erlewine praised Arnold's adaptation of "Carry Me Back to Old Virginny" and found the travel concept cute, but concluded that it is "more interesting as an artifact than an album."

== Track listing ==
Side A

1. "Indiana"
2. "Oklahoma Hills"
3. "Mister and Mississippi"
4. "Stars Fell on Alabama"
5. "Idaho"
6. "Kentucky Babe"

Side B

1. "Missouri"
2. "Carolina in the Morning"
3. "Carry Me Back to Old Virginny" (James A. Bland)
4. "On Miami Shore"
5. "Beautiful Ohio"
6. "Georgia on My Mind"
