= Tex Owens =

American singer-songwriter (1892–1962)

Tex Owens (June 15, 1892 – September 9, 1962) was an American country music singer and songwriter, best remembered today for writing the Eddy Arnold hit Cattle Call. The oldest of thirteen children, he was born Doie Hensley Owens in Killeen, Texas into a large and musically talented family. His brother was a singer and songwriter and his sister became a well-known Grand Ole Opry performer as Texas Ruby.

== Life and career ==
In his early teens Owens spent a year with a traveling tent show as a blackface singer. By his late teens he left music and found work in the Texas oilfields, and in Missouri, Kansas, and Colorado as a farmhand and mechanic. For a time, he was a lawman in Bridgeport, Oklahoma.

He was brought back to music in Lamar, Colorado, while he was hospitalized for an appendectomy. A group of children (five of whom had frozen to death before being rescued) who had been stranded in a blizzard were brought into the hospital, and he entertained them by singing songs. Their appreciative reaction pulled him back into music. After performing in medicine shows with his two daughters, he became known as "The Original Texas Ranger" on radio station KMBC in Kansas City, Missouri. His Brush Creek Follies show there lasted for more than eleven years and became nationally famous. He made many other radio appearances, hosting the Boone County Jamboree on WLW in Cincinnati.

In 1943 Owens moved to Hollywood and began to appear in films. During the shooting of the 1948 John Wayne movie Red River, his horse fell on him and he broke his back, an injury from which he never fully recovered. He retired from movies in the 1950s and moved to Texas, where he died of a heart attack in 1962, aged 70. In 1971, Tex Owens was posthumously inducted into the Nashville Songwriters Hall of Fame.

Owens's daughter, Laura Lee Owens (1920-1989) was the first female vocalist to tour with Bob Wills and the Texas Playboys. She later married band leader Dickie McBride and performed with him as Laura Lee McBride. In the 1970s, she toured with Ernest Tubb and the Texas Troubadours.

== Cattle Call ==
Owens made a recording of the song on August 28, 1934. The recording was not a success. Eddy Arnold recorded it in 1944 and again in 1955; both recordings were extremely successful. Tex Owens wrote over 100 songs, but this one was far and away his biggest success.

Inspiration for the song ‘’Cattle Call’’ came while he was in Kansas City watching the snow fall.

"Watching the snow, my sympathy went out to cattle everywhere, and I just wished I could call them all around me and break some corn over a wagon wheel and feed them. That's when the words 'cattle call' came to my mind. I picked up my guitar, and in thirty minutes I had wrote the music and four verses to the song."
