= Lonely Again (Eddy Arnold album) =

Studio album by Eddy Arnold
- Released: 1967
- Studio: RCA Victor, Nashville
- Genre: Country
- Label: RCA Victor
- Producer: Chet Atkins

Eddy Arnold chronology
Somebody Like Me (1966)	Lonely Again (1967)	The Best of Eddy Arnold (compilation) (1967)

Lonely Again is a studio album by country music singer Eddy Arnold. It was released in 1967 by RCA Victor.

== Chart performance ==
The album debuted on Billboard magazine's Top Country Albums chart on March 4, 1967, held the No. 1 spot for three weeks, and remained on the chart for a total of 31 weeks. The album also peaked at No. 57 on the Billboard Top LPs chart during a twenty four-week stay on the chart.

=== Single ===
The album was recorded after the No. 1 hit, "Lonely Again", after it the album was recorded and shares the same name with it.

== Reception ==
AllMusic gave the album a rating of three stars. Reviewer Greg Adams praised the "lush pop" and wrote that the entire album was "an easy listening pleasure."

== Track listing ==
Side A

1. "Lonely Again"
2. "Did It Rain"
3. "That's All I Want from You"
4. "Infant"
5. "Oh So Far from Home"
6. "When Your World Stops Turning"

Side B

1. "Meet Me at the Altar"
2. "Mary Who"
3. "Nobody's Darling but Mine"
4. "He's Got You"
5. "Bear with Me a Little Longer"
6. "The Wheel of Hurt"

== Charts ==
Chart (1967)	Peak position
US Billboard Hot Country Albums	1
US Billboard Top LPs	57
