= Turn the World Around (song) =

Single by Eddy Arnold

from the album Turn the World Around
- B-side: "Long Ride Home"
- Released: July 1967
- Genre: Country
- Label: RCA Victor
- Songwriter: Ben Peters
- Producer: Chet Atkins

Eddy Arnold singles chronology
"Misty Blue" (1967)	"Turn the World Around" (1967)	"Here Comes Heaven" (1967)

"Turn the World Around" is a song written by Ben Peters and was recorded as a 1967 single by Eddy Arnold. The single was Eddy Arnold's ninety-seventh release on the country chart. "Turn the World Around" would reach the number one spot on the country charts for one week and spend a total of fourteen weeks on the charts.

== Chart performance ==
Chart (1967)	Peak position
U.S. Billboard Hot Country Singles	1
U.S. Billboard Hot 100	66
U.S. Billboard Hot Adult Contemporary Tracks	3
Canadian RPM Country Tracks	4
Canadian RPM Top 100	47

== Cover Versions ==
- Dean Martin Recorded a cover of the song for his 1970 album My Woman, My Woman, My Wife
