= Turn the World Around (Eddy Arnold album) =

Studio album by Eddy Arnold
- Released: 1967
- Studio: RCA Victor, Nashville
- Genre: Country
- Label: RCA Victor
- Producer: Chet Atkins

Eddy Arnold chronology
The Best of Eddy Arnold (compilation) (1967)	Turn the World Around (1967)	The Everlovin' World of Eddy Arnold (1968)

Turn the World Around is a studio album by country music singer Eddy Arnold. It was released in 1967 by RCA Victor.

== Overview ==
The album debuted on Billboard magazine's Top Country Albums chart on September 16, 1967, held the No. 1 spot for 13 weeks, and remained on the chart for a total of 28 weeks. The album included the No. 1 hit, "Turn the World Around". The album also peaked at No. 34 on the Billboard Top LPs during thirty six-week stay on the chart. It ranked second in sales among the albums released by Arnold.

== Reception ==
Billboard wrote that "Eddy Arnold won’t miss with his latest sure-fire album, which has his latest hit as its title," and they add that "The album contains 11 other cuts that will appeal to Arnold’s many pop country fans. In addition to such top material like “Release Me,” “Walk With Me,” and “It’s Such a Pretty World Today,” gems include “Castle Made of Walls” and “Don’t Keep Me Lonely Too Long.”

AllMusic gave the album a rating of four stars.

== Track listing ==
Side A

1. "Walk with Me"
2. "Release Me (And Let Me Love Again)"
3. "Don't Keep Me Lonely Too Long"
4. "That's All That's Left of My Baby"
5. "When There's A Fire in Your Heart"
6. "I'll Love You More"

Side B

1. "Turn the World Around" (Ben Peters) 2:26
2. "It's Such a Pretty World Today" (Dale Noe) [2:42]
3. "There's This About You"
4. "I Guess I'll Never Understand"
5. "Castle Made of Walls"
6. "Love Finds a Way"

== Charts ==
Chart (1967)	Peak position
US Top Country Albums	1
US Billboard Top LPs	34
