= The Cattle Call =

1934 song by Tex Owens

Single by Tex Owens
- B-side: Pride of the Prairie
- Published: September 14, 1934 by Forster Music Publisher, Inc., Chicago
- Released: October 1934
- Recorded: August 28, 1934
- Studio: Chicago, Illinois
- Genre: Folk
- Length: 3:09
- Label: Decca 5015
- Songwriter: Tex Owens

"The Cattle Call" is a song written and recorded in 1934 by American songwriter and musician Tex Owens. The melody was adapted from Bruno Rudzinski's 1928 recording "Pawel Walc". It later became a signature song for Eddy Arnold. Members of the Western Writers of America chose it as one of the Top 100 Western songs of all time.

Owens wrote the song in Kansas City while watching the snow fall. "Watching the snow, my sympathy went out to cattle everywhere, and I just wished I could call them all around me and break some corn over a wagon wheel and feed them. That's when the words 'cattle call' came to my mind. I picked up my guitar, and in thirty minutes I had wrote the music and four verses to the song," he said. His August 28, 1934, recording was among the first for the newly formed Decca Record Company. He recorded it again in 1936.

"The Cattle Call"

Single by Eddy Arnold and his Tennessee Plowboys
- B-side: Each Minute Seems a Million Years
- Released: May 14, 1945
- Recorded: December 4, 1944
- Studio: WSM Radio Station Studio, Nashville, TN
- Genre: Hillbilly-Country
- Length: 3:06
- Label: Bluebird 33-0527

"The Cattle Call"

Single by Eddy Arnold

from the album Eddy Arnold Sings
- Released: November 18, 1949
- Recorded: September 14, 1949
- Length: 2:27
- Label: RCA Victor 48-0136
- Producer: Stephen H. Sholes

Eddy Arnold singles chronology
"One Kiss Too Many / The Echo of Your Footsteps" (1949)	"The Cattle Call" (1949)	"I'm Throwing Rice (At The Girl That I Love)" (1949)

"The Cattle Call"

Single by Eddy Arnold with Hugo Winterhalter's Orchestra And Chorus
- Released: June 14, 1955
- Recorded: April 28, 1955
- Studio: Webster Hall, New York City
- Length: 2:34
- Label: RCA Victor 20-6139
- Producer: Stephen H. Sholes

"Cattle Call"

Single by Eddy Arnold with LeAnn Rimes

from the album Seven Decades of Hits and Blue
- B-side: "I Walk Alone"
- Released: November 16, 1999
- Recorded: 1996
- Length: 3:09
- Label: Curb
- Songwriter: Tex Owens
- Producers: Chuck Howard; Wilbur C. Rimes; Bob Campbell-Smith; Johnny Mulhair; Greg Walker

LeAnn Rimes singles chronology
"Big Deal" (1999)	"Cattle Call" (1999)	"Crazy" (1999)

== Cover versions and later uses ==
Eddy Arnold recorded "The Cattle Call" four times, at his first session in 1944, 1949, and in 1955 with Hugo Winterhalter's Chorus and Orchestra. The latter version spent 26 weeks on the country chart, peaking at number one for two weeks. Arnold recorded a simpler arrangement in 1963 for the title track of a collection of cowboy and western songs.

The song was recorded by Tex Ritter (1947), Carolina Cotton (1951) and Slim Whitman (1954). Whitman's version peaked at number 11 on the C&W Best Seller chart.

Other versions were recorded by Billy Walker (1965), Donn Reynolds (1965), Elvis Presley (1970), Gil Trythall (1971), Lenny Breau and Chet Atkins (Standard Brands, 1981), Boxcar Willie (1986), Don Edwards (1992), Emmylou Harris (1992), Skip Gorman (1994), Wylie Gustafson (1994), LeAnn Rimes (1996 with Arnold and on November 16, 1999, Arnold released the recording as a single) and Dwight Yoakam (1998) for the motion picture soundtrack of The Horse Whisperer. Also performed by the Sons of the Pioneers featuring Ken Curtis in the movie Rio Grande (1950).

The Eddy Arnold version of the song was heard in the 1997 movie Private Parts during the scene when Howard Stern, whose station "W4" in Detroit had just changed formats from rock to country, abruptly resigned on the air telling listeners he didn't understand the music. It was additionally featured in the film My Own Private Idaho. In 2023, it was included on the soundtrack of the film Asteroid City by Wes Anderson.

== Charts ==
=== Arnold and Rimes' version ===
==== Weekly charts ====
Chart (1999)	Peak position
US Top Country Singles Sales (Billboard)	18
