= Eddy Arnold =

American country music singer (1918–2008)

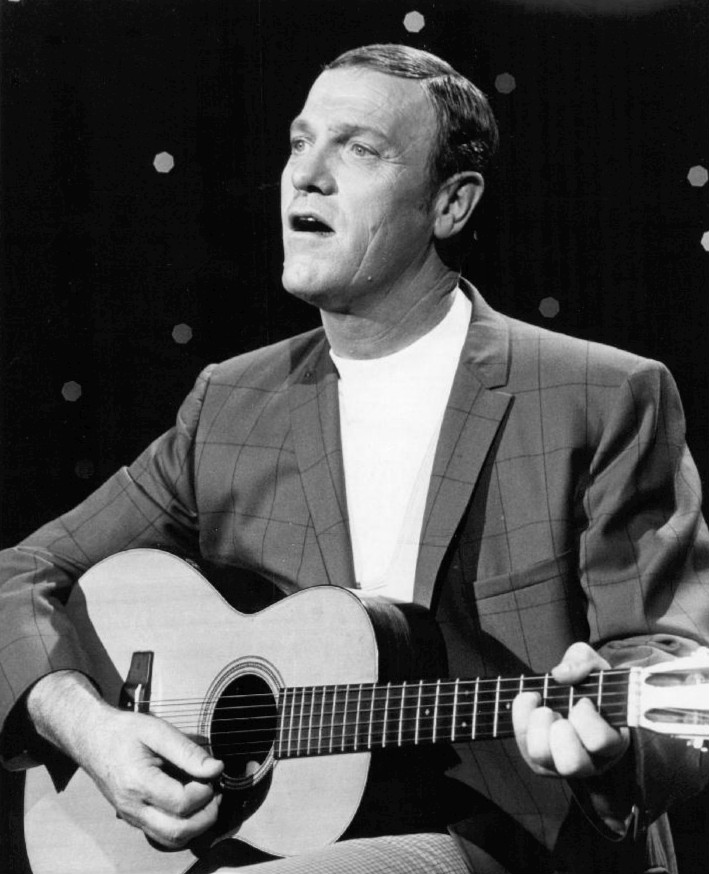
- Arnold in 1969

Background information
- Also known as: The Tennessee Plowboy
- Born: Richard Edward Arnold; May 15, 1918; Henderson, Tennessee, U.S.
- Died: May 8, 2008 (aged 89) Franklin, Tennessee, U.S.
- Genres: Country, gospel, pop
- Occupations: Singer, songwriter, tv host, actor
- Instrument: Guitar
- Years active: 1934–2005
- Labels: RCA Victor (1944–1972; 1976–2008); MGM Records (1973–1976)
- Spouse: Sally Gayhart (m. 1941; died 2008)

Richard Edward Arnold (May 15, 1918 – May 8, 2008) was an American country music singer. He was a Nashville sound (country/popular music) innovator of the late 1950s, and scored 147 songs on the Billboard country music charts, second only to George Jones. He sold more than 85 million records. A member of the Grand Ole Opry (beginning 1943) and the Country Music Hall of Fame (beginning 1966), Arnold ranked 22nd on Country Music Television's 2003 list of "The 40 Greatest Men of Country Music."

== Early years ==
Arnold was born on May 15, 1918, on a farm near Henderson, Tennessee. His father, a sharecropper, played the fiddle, while his mother played guitar. Arnold's father died when he was just 11, forcing him to leave school and begin helping on the family farm. This led to him later gaining his nickname, the Tennessee Plowboy. Arnold attended Pinson High School in Pinson, Tennessee, where he played guitar for school functions and events. He quit before graduation to help with the farm work, but continued performing, often arriving on a mule with his guitar hung on his back. Arnold also worked part-time as an assistant at a mortuary.

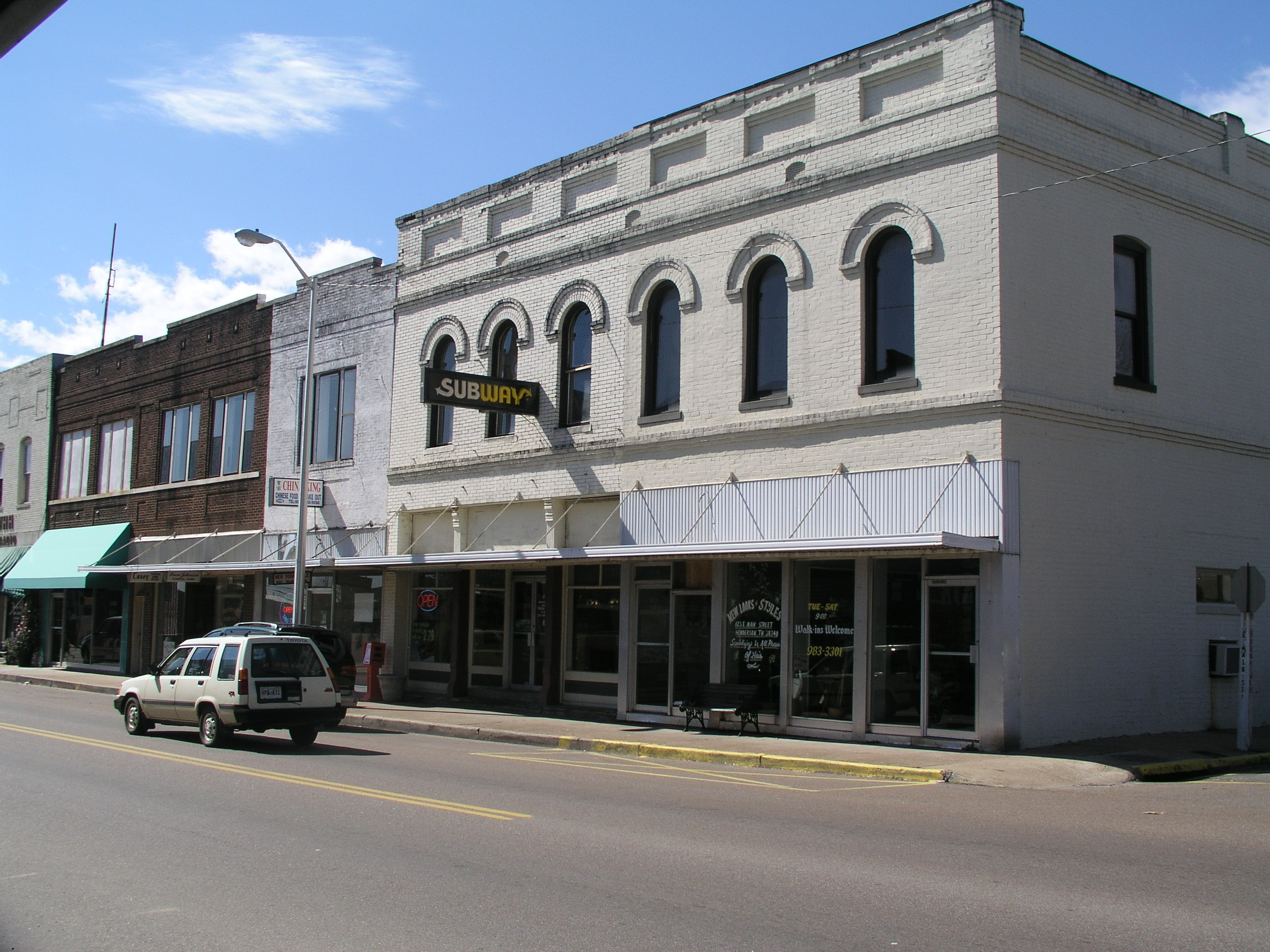
Downtown Henderson, Tennessee, the city near which Arnold was born

In 1934, at age 16, Arnold made his debut on WTJS-AM in Jackson, Tennessee. He began performing at local nightclubs and was hired permanently by WTJS in 1937. In 1938, he was hired by WMPS-AM in Memphis, Tennessee, where he was one of its most popular performers. He soon left WMPS for KWK-AM in St. Louis, Missouri, followed briefly by a spot at WHAS-AM in Louisville, Kentucky.

He performed for WSM (AM) on the Grand Ole Opry during 1943 as a solo artist. In 1944, Arnold signed a contract with RCA Victor, and with manager Colonel Tom Parker who would later manage Elvis Presley. Arnold's first single was little noticed, but the next, "Each Minute Seems a Million Years", scored number five on the country charts in 1945. Its success began a decade of unprecedented chart performance; Arnold's next 57 singles all ranked in the top 10 in the US country charts, including 19 number-one successes.

In 1946, Arnold scored his first major success with "That's How Much I Love You". In 1948, he had five successful songs on the charts simultaneously. That year, he had nine songs in the top 10; five of these were number one and scored there for 40 of the year's 52 weeks. With Parker's management, Arnold continued to dominate, with 13 of the 20 best-scoring country music songs of 1947–1948. He became the host of Mutual Radio's Purina-sponsored segment of the Opry and of Mutual's Checkerboard Jamboree, a midday program shared with Ernest Tubb that was broadcast from a Nashville theater. Recorded radio programs increased Arnold's popularity, as did the CBS Radio series Hometown Reunion with the Duke of Paducah. Arnold quit the Opry during 1948, and his Hometown Reunion briefly broadcast in competition with the Opry on Saturday nights. In 1949 and 1950, he performed in the Columbia movies Feudin' Rhythm and Hoedown.

Arnold began working for television in the early 1950s, hosting The Eddy Arnold Show. The summer program was broadcast successively by all three television networks, replacing the Perry Como and Dinah Shore programs. He also performed as a guest and a guest host on the ABC-TV show Ozark Jubilee from 1955 to 1960. Arnold featured in the syndicated Eddy Arnold Time from 1955 to 1957. From 1960 to 1961, he hosted NBC-TV's Today on the Farm.

== Second career: The Nashville sound ==
With the rise of rock and roll in the mid-1950s, Arnold's record sales began to decline, though fellow RCA Victor country recording artist Jim Reeves found a greater audience with popular-sounding string-laced arrangements. Arnold annoyed many in the country music establishment by recording with Hugo Winterhalter and his Orchestra at the RCA Victor Studios in New York. Winterhalter's pop-oriented arrangements of "The Cattle Call" and "The Richest Man (in the World)", however, helped to expand Arnold's appeal beyond its country music base. This style, pioneered by Reeves and Arnold, became known as the "Nashville Sound". During 1953, Arnold and Tom Parker had a dispute, and Arnold fired him. From 1954 to 1963, Arnold's performances were managed by Joe Csida; in 1964, Csida was replaced by Jerry Purcell.

Arnold embarked on a second career that brought his music to a more diverse audience. In the summer of 1965, he had his first number-one country song in 10 years, "What's He Doing in My World" and struck gold again six months later with the song that became his most well-known, "Make the World Go Away", accompanied by pianist Floyd Cramer on piano and featuring the Anita Kerr Singers. As a result, Arnold's rendition became an international success. "Make The World Go Away" became his only top ten pop hit.

Bill Walker's orchestra arrangements provided the lush background for 16 continuous successes sung by Arnold in the late 1960s. Arnold performed with symphony orchestras in New York City, Las Vegas, and Hollywood. He performed in Carnegie Hall for two concerts, and in the Coconut Grove in Los Angeles. In 1966, Arnold was inducted into the Country Music Hall of Fame, the youngest performer to receive the honor. The following year, Arnold was voted the first-ever awarded Country Music Association's Entertainer of the Year. Two years later, he released an autobiography named It's A Long Way From Chester County.

Having been with RCA Victor since 1944, Arnold left the label in 1973 for MGM Records, where he recorded four albums, which included several top-40 successes. He returned to RCA in 1976 and recorded for the company for the remainder of his career.

== Later years and death ==
During the 1980s, Arnold declared himself semi-retired, but he continued recording. In 1984, the Academy of Country Music awarded Arnold its Pioneer Award. His next album, You Don't Miss A Thing, was released in 1991, and he toured for several more years. By 1992, he had sold nearly 85 million records, and had a total of 145 weeks of number-one songs, more weeks than any other singer.

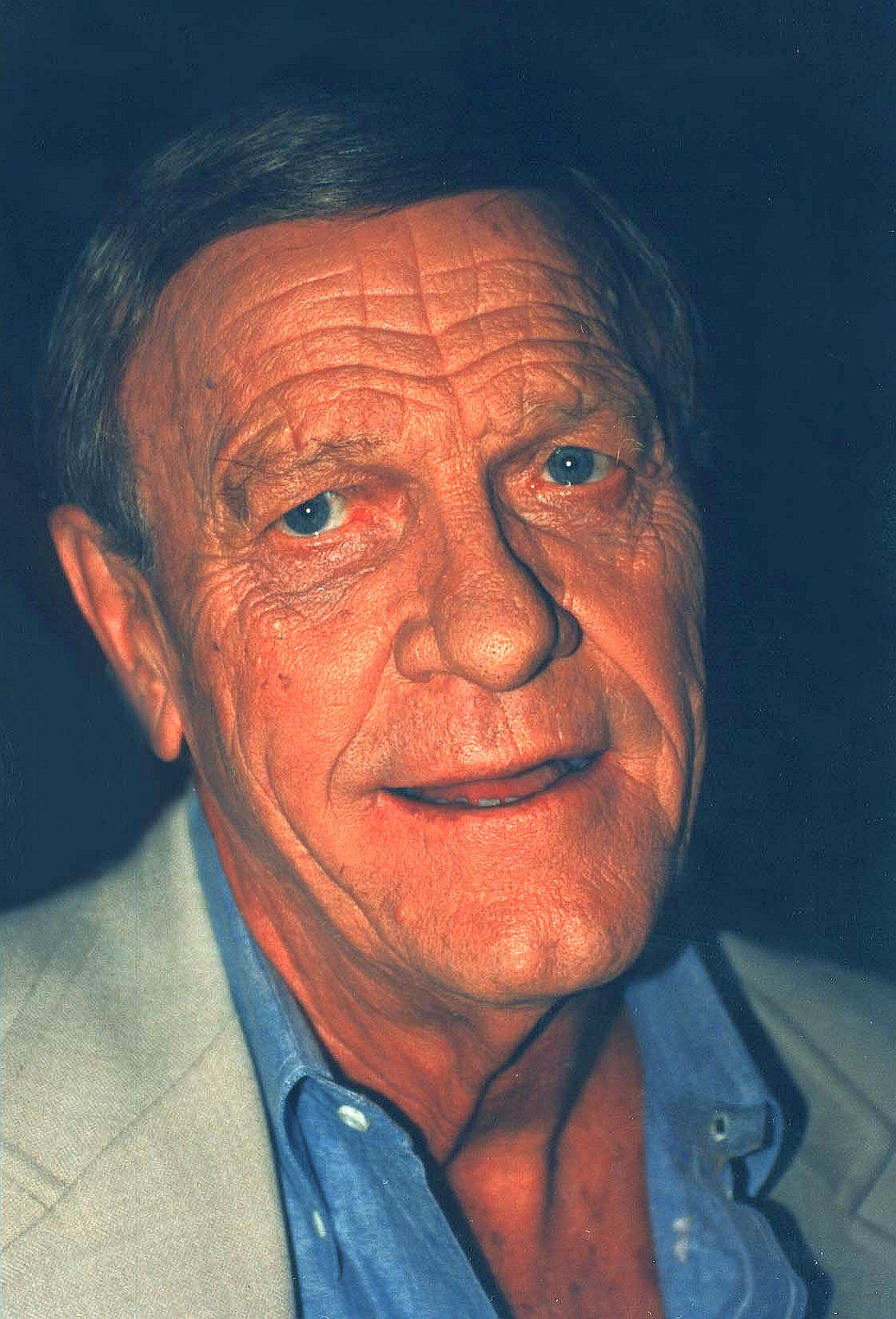
Arnold in 1998

In 1996, RCA issued an album of Arnold's main successes since 1944 as part of its 'Essential' series. Arnold, then 78 years old, retired from active singing, though he still performed occasionally. On May 16, 1998, the day after his 80th birthday, he announced his final retirement during a concert at the Hotel Orleans in Las Vegas. That same year, the National Academy of Recording Arts and Sciences inducted the recording of "Make The World Go Away" into the Grammy Hall of Fame. In 2000, he was awarded the National Medal of Arts. In 2005, Arnold received a Lifetime Achievement Award from the Recording Academy, and later that year, released a final album for RCA titled After All These Years.

Arnold died from natural causes on May 8, 2008, in a care facility in Nashville, at age 89.

On May 31, 2008, RCA released "To Life" as a single from the album After All These Years. It debuted at number 49 on the Hot Country Songs charts, Arnold's first entry in 25 years and the recording by the oldest person to chart in Billboard magazine. It set the record for the longest span between a first chart single and a last: 62 years and 11 months ("Each Minute Seems Like a Million Years" debuted on June 30, 1945), and extended Arnold's career chart history to seven decades.

== Discography ==
Studio albums

- To Mother (1950)
- Wanderin' with Eddy Arnold (1955)
- Chapel on the Hill (1956)
- A Little on the Lonely Side (1957)
- When They Were Young (1957)
- My Darling, My Darling (1958)
- Praise Him, Praise Him (1958)
- Thereby Hangs a Tale (1959)
- Have Guitar Will Travel (1959)
- You Gotta Have Love (1960)
- One More Time (1962)
- Christmas with Eddy Arnold (1962)
- Our Man Down South (1963)
- Cattle Call (1963)
- Faithfully Yours (1963)
- Folk Song Book (1964)
- Sometimes I'm Happy, Sometimes I'm Blue (1964)
- Pop Hits from the Country Side (1964)
- The Easy Way (1965)
- My World (1965)
- I Want to Go with You (1966)
- The Last Word in Lonesome (1966)
- Somebody Like Me (1966)
- Lonely Again (1967)
- Turn the World Around (1967)
- The Everlovin' World of Eddy Arnold (1968)
- The Romantic World of Eddy Arnold (1968)
- Walkin' in Love Land (1968)
- Songs of the Young World (1969)
- The Glory of Love (1969)
- The Warmth of Eddy (1969)
- Love and Guitars (1970)
- Standing Alone (1970)
- Portrait of My Woman (1971)
- Welcome to My World (1971)
- Loving Her Was Easier (1971)
- Lonely People (1972)
- Eddy Arnold Sings for Housewives and Other Lovers (1972)
- So Many Ways/If the Whole World Stopped Lovin' (1973)
- She's Got Everything I Need (1973)
- I Wished That I Had Loved You Better (1974)
- The World (1975)
- Eddy (1976)
- I Need You All the Time (1977)
- Somebody Loves You (1979)
- A Legend and His Lady (1980)
- A Man For All Seasons (1981)
- Don't Give Up on Me (1982)
- Close Enough to Love (1983)
- You Don't Miss a Thing (1991)
- Christmas Time (1997)
- Seven Decades of Hits (2000)
- After All These Years (2005)
