= List of songs written by Hank Williams =

This list contains 167 songs written by American singer-songwriter Hank Williams, including those where he is credited as co-author. The songs are arranged alphabetically.

== A ==
- A Home in Heaven
- A House of Gold
- A House Without Love
- Alabama Waltz
- All the Love I Ever Had
- Alone and Forsaken
- Always in Love (co-written with Jimmy Fields)
- Angel of Death
- Angel Mine (lyrics by Williams, recorded by Sheryl Crow for The Lost Notebooks of Hank Williams)
- At the First Fall of Snow
- Are You Building a Temple in Heaven?
- A Mansion on the Hill (co-written with Fred Rose with possible contributions from Audrey Williams)
- Are You Walkin' and a Talkin' For the Lord?
- A Stranger in the Night (co-written with Bill Morgan)

== B ==
- Baby Sittin' the Blues (co-written with Jimmy Fields)
- Baby, We're Really in Love
- Bayou Pon Pon (co-written with Jimmie Davis)
- Between You and God And Me (co-written with Lawton Williams)
- Blue Is My Heart (lyrics by Williams, recorded by Holly Williams and Hank Williams, Jr. for The Lost Notebooks of Hank Williams)
- The Blues Come Around
- Blues Done Left Me

== C ==
- Cajun Baby (lyrics by Williams; music composed by Hank Williams, Jr.)
- Cajun Baby Blues (co-written with Jimmy Fields)
- California Zephyr
- Calling You
- Coeur Brise (co-written with William Lamothe)
- Cold, Cold Heart
- Come a Runnin' (co-written with Jimmy Fields)
- Countryfied
- Cowboys Don't Cry (lyrics by Williams, music composed by Mickey Newbury)
- Crazy Mixed Up Heart (co-written with Jimmy Fields)

== D ==
- Dear Brother
- Dear John
- Diddy Wa Diddy
- Dreamer's Paradise

== E ==
- Everything's Okay

== F ==
- For Me There Is No Place (lyrics by Williams; music composed by Hank Williams, Jr.)
- Forever's a Long, Long Time (co-written with Jimmie Davis)
- The Funeral

== G ==
- Got You On My Mind Once Again (co-written with Jimmy Fields and Lefty Frizzell)
- Goin' Steady (Faron Young Classic) It was found out some years ago by Colin Escott (Hank Williams' Biographer) that Hank actually wrote the song and sold it to Faron.

== H ==
- Have Half a Heart (co-written with Jimmy Fields)
- Heaven Holds All My Treasures
- Help Me Understand
- Hey, Good Lookin'
- Homesick (lyrics by Williams; music composed by Hank Williams, Jr.)
- Honey, Do You Love Me, Huh? (co-written with Curley Williams)
- Honky Tonk Blues
- Honky Tonkin'
- How Can You Refuse Him Now
- How Many Times Have You Broken My Heart? (lyrics by Williams, recorded by Gillian Welch and Norah Jones for The Lost Notebooks of Hank Williams)
- Howlin' at the Moon

== I ==
- I Ain't Got Nothin' but Time
- I Can't Escape from You
- I Can't Get You Off of My Mind
- I Can't Help It (If I'm Still in Love with You)
- I Could Never Be Ashamed of You
- I Don't Care (If Tomorrow Never Comes)
- (I Heard That) Lonesome Whistle (co-written with Jimmie Davis)
- I Hope You Shed a Million Tears (lyrics by Williams, recorded by Vince Gill and Rodney Crowell for The Lost Notebooks of Hank Williams)
- I Just Don't Like This Kind of Living
- I Lost the Only Love I Knew (co-written with Don Helms)
- I Saw the Light
- I Told A Lie To My Heart (recorded by Willie Nelson and Hank Williams for Half Nelson)
- I Wish You Didn't Love Me So Much
- I Won't Be Home No More
- I'd Still Want You
- I'll Be a Bachelor 'Til I Die
- I'll Never Get Out of This World Alive (co-written with Fred Rose)
- I'm a Long Gone Daddy
- I'm Blue, I'm Lonesome (co-written with Bill Monroe)
- I'm Gonna Break Your Heart
- (I'm Gonna) Sing, Sing, Sing
- I'm Not Coming Home Anymore
- I'm Praying For the Day (co-written with Pee Wee King)
- I'm So Happy I Found You (lyrics by Williams, recorded by Lucinda Williams for The Lost Notebooks of Hank Williams)
- I'm So Lonesome I Could Cry
- I'm Sorry for You, My Friend
- I'm Yvonne Of The Bayou co-written with Jimmy Rule and likely Moon Mullican
- I've Been Down That Road Before
- If You Call This Loving (co-written with Jimmy Fields)

== J ==
- Jambalaya (On the Bayou) (lyrics co-written with Moon Mullican; melody adapted from "Grand Texas")
- Jesus Died for Me
- Jesus Is Calling (co-written with Charlie Monroe)
- Jesus Remembered Me
- Just Waitin' (co-written with Bob Gazzaway)

== K ==
- Kaw-Liga (co-written with Fred Rose)

== L ==
- Last Night I Dreamed of Heaven
- (Last Night) I Heard You Crying in Your Sleep
- Lead Me to that Rock
- Leave Me Alone with the Blues
- Let the Spirit Descend
- Let's Turn Back the Years
- The Little House We Built (Just o'er the Hill) (co-written with Don Helms)
- Little Paper Boy
- The Log Train
- Long Gone Lonesome Blues
- Lord, Build Me a Cabin in Glory
- Lord, I'm Coming Home
- Lost on the River (with Audrey Williams)
- The Love that Faded (lyrics by Williams, recorded by Bob Dylan for The Lost Notebooks of Hank Williams)
- Low and Lonely
- Low Down Blues

== M ==
- May You Never Be Alone
- Me and My Broken Heart
- Men with Broken Hearts
- Mind Your Own Business
- Moanin' the Blues
- Move It on Over
- My Heart is True Confession (co-written with Jimmy Fields)
- My Heart Would Know
- My Love for You (Has Turned to Hate)
- My Receipt for Love
- My Son Calls Another Man Daddy (co-written with Jewell House)
- My Sweet Love Ain't Around
- My Unfaithful Heart (co-written with Jimmy Fields)

== N ==
- 'Neath a Cold Gray Tomb of Stone (co-written with Mel Foree)
- Never Again (Will I Knock on Your Door)
- Never Been So Lonesome
- No, Not Now (co-written with Curley Williams)
- Nobody's Lonesome for Me

== O ==
- Oh, Mama, Come Home (lyrics by Williams, recorded by Jacob Dylan for The Lost Notebooks of Hank Williams)
- On the Banks of the Old Ponchartrain (co-written with Ramona Vincent)
- On the Evening Train (co-written with Audrey Williams)

== P ==
- Pan American
- Pictures from Life's Other Side (arranged by Hank Williams)
- Please Make Up Your Mind

== R ==
- Ramblin' Man
- Rockin' Chair Daddy (co-written with Gordon Schuffert)
- Rose My Rose (co-written with Jimmy Field
- Rootie Tootie

== S ==
- The Sermon on the Mount (lyrics by Williams, recorded by Merle Haggard for The Lost Notebooks of Hank Williams)
- Singing Waterfall
- Six More Miles (To the Graveyard)
- Steppin' Out (co-written with Jimmy Fields)
- Stranger in the Night (co-written with Bill Morgan)

== T ==
- Tank Full of Gas (co-written with Lefty Frizzell and Jimmy Fields)
- A Teardrop on a Rose
- Tell Me Something (co-written with Jimmy Fields)
- There'll Be No Teardrops Tonight
- There's a Tear in My Beer
- There's Nothing as Sweet as My Baby
- Time Has Proven Me Wrong
- 30 Pieces of Silver

== W ==
- The Waltz of the Wind
- Wealth Won't Save Your Soul
- We're Getting Closer To The Grave Each Day
- Wearin' Out Your Walkin' Shoes
- Weary Blues from Waitin'
- When God Comes and Gathers His Jewels
- When It Comes to Loving (co-written with Jimmy Fields)
- When the Book of Life is Read
- When You're Tired of Breaking Others' Hearts (co-written with Curley Williams)
- Which Way (co-written with Jimmy Fields)
- Why Don't You Love Me
- Why Should I Cry
- Why Should We Try Anymore
- WPA Blues (never recorded; Williams performed the song during a talent show at The Empire Theater in 1937.)
- Won't You Sometimes Think Of Me

== Y ==
- You Know That I Know (lyrics by Williams, recorded by Jack White for The Lost Notebooks of Hank Williams)
- You'll Never Again Be Mine (lyrics by Williams, recorded by Levon Helm for The Lost Notebooks of Hank Williams)
- Your Cheatin' Heart
- You're Through Fooling Me (lyrics by Williams, recorded by Patty Loveless for The Lost Notebooks of Hank Williams)
- You've Been Lonesome, Too (lyrics by Williams, recorded by Alan Jackson for The Lost Notebooks of Hank Williams)
- You Win Again

== See also ==
- Hank Williams discography
