= Hank Williams discography =

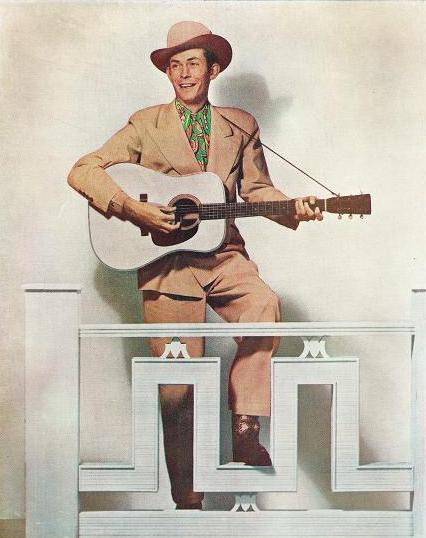
- Williams in 1951
- Studio albums: 2
- Live albums: 8 (posthumous)
- Compilation albums: 25
- Singles: 41
- Posthumous singles: 30
- Posthumous studio albums: 10
- No. 1 singles: 11

Hank Williams' discography is composed of 41 singles and 2 ten-inch LPs released during his six-year career; as well as posthumous work including: singles, compilation albums and previously unreleased material. During his lifetime, Williams placed 30 songs on Billboard's Top C&W Records, while he had eleven number one hits.

After being signed with the help of Fred Rose to Sterling Records, Williams assisted his debut recording session on December 11, 1946 at Castle Recording Laboratory's studio D in Nashville, Tennessee. The singer cut four songs, returning later on February 13, 1947 to cut four new sides. His first single, "Never Again (Will I Knock on Your Door)" backed with "Calling You" was released in January 1947. Not satisfied with Sterling, and upon learning of the creation of MGM Records by the Loews Corporation, Fred Rose negotiated a deal for Williams. Rose bought the Sterling masters, became Williams' manager and signed him to the label, agreeing to record all of his sessions in Nashville. By June 1947, Williams debuted on the MGM label with "Move it On Over" backed with "(Last Night) I Heard You Crying in Your Sleep". The release quickly became a hit.

On September 23, 1952, Williams cut his final session, recording "Your Cheatin' Heart", "Kaw-Liga", "I Could Never Be Ashamed of You" and "Take These Chains from My Heart". Williams' last single during his lifetime, "I'll Never Get Out of This World Alive" backed with "I Could Never Be Ashamed of You" was released on November 21, 1952. From 1947 to 1952, MGM Records released 27 singles by Williams, five of which turned into million sellers. "Kaw-Liga", "Your Cheatin' Heart" and "Take These Chains From My Heart" became posthumous number-one singles.

== Studio albums ==
Title	Details
Hank Williams Sings	Release date: November 9, 1951; Label: MGM Records
Moanin' the Blues	Release date: September 12, 1952; Label: MGM Records

== Posthumously released albums ==
=== Studio albums ===
Title	Details	Peak positions
Title	Details	US Country
Memorial Album	Release date: 1953; Label: MGM Records	—
Hank Williams as Luke the Drifter	Release date: 1953; Label: MGM Records	—
Honky Tonkin'	Release date: 1954; Label: MGM Records	—
I Saw the Light	Release date: 1954; Label: MGM Records	—
Ramblin' Man	Release date: 1955; Label: MGM Records	—
Just Me and My Guitar	Release date: 1985; Label: CMF	—
The Unreleased Recordings	Release date: 2008; Label: Time Life	42
The Unreleased Recordings: Gospel Keepsakes	Release date: 2009; Label: Time Life	51
The Unreleased Recordings: Revealed	Release date: 2009; Label: Time Life	64
"—" denotes releases that did not chart

=== Live albums ===
Title	Details	Peak chart positions	
Title	Details	US Country	US
Hank Williams on Stage	Release date: 1962; Label: MGM Records	—	—
On Stage Volume II	Release date: 1963; Label: MGM Records	—	—
Hank Williams, Sr. / Live at the Grand Ole Opry	Release date: 1976; Label: MGM Records	13	27
Health & Happiness Shows	Release date: 1993; Label: Mercury	—	—
The Complete Mother's Best Recordings...Plus!	Release date: 2010; Label: Time Life	—	—
The Lost Concerts	Release date: 2012; Label: Time Life	66	—
The Greatest Hits Live: Volume 1	Release date: 2012; Label: Time Life	61	—
The Greatest Hits Live: Volume 2	Release date: 2012; Label: Time Life	67	—
The Garden Spot Programs, 1950	Release date: 2014; Label: Omnivore Recordings	43	—
"—" denotes releases that did not chart

=== Compilation albums ===
Title	Details	Peak positions	Certifications (sales threshold)
Title	Details	US Country	Certifications (sales threshold)
36 of His Greatest Hits	Release date: 1957; Label: MGM Records	—	
Sing Me a Blue Song	Release date: 1957; Label: MGM Records	—	
Hank Williams Sings 36 More of His Great Hits	Release date: 1958; Label: MGM Records	—	
The Immortal Hank Williams	Release date: 1958; Label: MGM Records	—	
The Unforgettable Hank Williams	Release date: 1959; Label: MGM Records	—	
Wait for the Light to Shine	Release date: 1960; Label: MGM Records	—	
The Lonesome Sound of Hank Williams	Release date: 1960; Label: MGM Records	—	
The First, Last & Always	Release date: 1961; Label: MGM Records	—	
I'm Blue Inside	Release date: 1961; Label: MGM Records	—	
The Very Best of Hank Williams	Release date: 1963; Label: MGM Records	—	US: Platinum
The Legend Lives Anew	Release date: 1966; Label: MGM Records	35	
In the Beginning	Release date: 1968; Label: MGM Records	37	
Hank Williams' Greatest Hits	Release date: 1968; Label: MGM Records	42	US: Platinum
The Essential Hank Williams	Release date: 1969; Label: MGM Records	25	
Life to Legend	Release date: 1970; Label: MGM Records	34	
Insights Into Hank Williams in Song and Story	Release date: 1974; Label: MGM Records	37	
24 of Hank Williams' Greatest Hits	Release date: 1976; Label: MGM Records	16	US: Platinum
24 Greatest Hits Vol. 2	Release date: 1977; Label: Polydor Records	49	
40 Greatest Hits	Release date: 1978; Label: Mercury Records	—	US: Platinum
The Hits, Volume 1	Release date: 1994; Label: Mercury Records	—	
The Complete Hank Williams	Release date: September 22, 1998; Label: Mercury Records	—	
20 of Hank Williams' Greatest Hits	Release date: 1998; Label: Mercury Records	—	US: Gold
20th Century Masters – The Millennium Collection: The Best of Hank Williams	Release date: 1999; Label: Mercury Records - Nashville	—	
Lovesick Blues	Release date: 2001; Label: ASV, Living Era	—	
The Ultimate Collection	Release date: 2002; Label: Mercury Records	32	
Hank Williams Gold	Release date: 2005; Label: Mercury Records	—	
20th Century Masters - The Millennium Collection: The Best of Hank Williams Vol. 2	Release date: 2006; Label: Mercury Records - Nashville	—	
Bound for the Promised Land	Release date: 2011; Label: Time Life	53	
Icon: Hank Williams	Release date: 2011; Label: Mercury Records	51	
"—" denotes releases that did not chart

=== Collaborations ===
Title	Details	Peak chart positions		
Title	Details	US Country	US	CAN Country
Father & Son (with Hank Williams, Jr.)	Release date: 1965; Label: MGM Records	8	139	—
Hank Williams / Hank Williams Jr. Again (with Hank Williams, Jr.)	Release date: 1967; Label: MGM Records	38	—	—
The Legend of Hank Williams in Song and Story (with Hank Williams, Jr.)	Release date: 1973; Label: MGM Records	17	—	—
The Best of Hank & Hank (with Hank Williams, Jr.)	Release date: 1992; Label: Curb Records	44	179	26
Three Hanks: Men with Broken Hearts (with Hank Williams, Jr. and Hank Williams III)	Release date: September 17, 1996; Label: Curb Records	29	—	—
"—" denotes releases that did not chart

== Singles ==
Year	Single (A-side, B-side) Both sides from same album except where indicated	Peak chart positions		Album
Year	Single (A-side, B-side) Both sides from same album except where indicated	US Country	US	Album
1947	"Never Again (Will I Knock On Your Door)" b/w "Calling You" (from I Saw The Light)	—	—	The Unforgettable Hank Williams
1947	"Wealth Won't Save Your Soul" b/w "When God Comes and Gathers His Jewels (from I Saw The Light)	—	—	In The Beginning
1947	"My Love for You (Has Turned to Hate)" b/w "I Don't Care (If Tomorrow Never Comes)"	—	—	The Unforgettable Hank Williams
1947	"Pan American" b/w "Honky Tonkin'" (from Honky Tonkin')	—	—	The Immortal Hank Williams
1947	"Move It On Over" b/w "(Last Night) I Heard You Crying in Your Sleep" (from Sing Me A Blue Song)	4	—	Memorial Album
1947	"On The Banks Of The Old Ponchartrain" b/w "Fly Trouble" (from The Immortal Hank Williams)	—	—	The Unforgettable Hank Williams
1948	"My Sweet Love Ain't Around" b/w "Rootie Tootie" (from Honky-Tonkin')	—	—	Moanin' The Blues
1948	"Honky Tonkin'" b/w "I'll Be a Bachelor 'Til I Die" (from The Unforgettable Hank Williams)	14	—	Honky-Tonkin'
1948	"I'm A Long Gone Daddy" b/w "The Blues Come Around"	6	—	Moanin' The Blues
1948	"I Saw The Light" b/w "Six More Miles (To the Graveyard)" (from Sing Me A Blue Song)	—	—	I Saw The Light /
1948	"Mansion On The Hill" b/w "I Can't Get You Off of My Mind" (from The Unforgettable Hank Williams)	12	—	Sing Me A Blue Song
1949	"Lovesick Blues"	1	24	Moanin' The Blues
1949	"Never Again (Will I Knock On Your Door)"	6	—	The Unforgettable Hank Williams
1949	"Wedding Bells" b/w "I've Just Told Mama Goodbye"	2	—	Sing Me A Blue Song
1949	"Mind Your Own Business" b/w "There'll Be No Teardrops Tonight" (from Ramblin' Man)	5	—	Honky-Tonkin'
1949	"You're Gonna Change (Or I'm Gonna Leave)"	4	—	Ramblin' Man
1949	"Lost Highway"	12	—	Sing Me A Blue Song
1949	"My Bucket's Got A Hole In It"	2	—	Honky-Tonkin'
1949	"I'm So Lonesome I Could Cry"	2	—	Moanin' The Blues
1950	"I Just Don't Like This Kind Of Living" b/w "May You Never Be Alone" (from Sing Me A Blue Song)	5	—	Ramblin' Man
1950	"Long Gone Lonesome Blues"	1	—	Moanin' The Blues
1950	"My Son Calls Another Man Daddy"	9	—	Ramblin' Man
1950	"Why Don't You Love Me" b/w "A House Without Love" (from Sing Me A Blue Song)	1	—	Ramblin' Man
1950	"Why Should We Try Anymore"	9	—	Sing Me A Blue Song
1950	"They'll Never Take Her Love From Me"	5	—	Sing Me A Blue Song
1950	"Moanin' The Blues"	1	—	Moanin' The Blues
1950	"Nobody's Lonesome For Me"	9	—	Ramblin' Man
1951	"Dear John"	8	—	The Unforgettable Hank Williams
1951	"Cold, Cold Heart"	1	—	Memorial Album
1951	"Howlin' At The Moon"	3	—	Honky-Tonkin'
1951	"I Can't Help It (If I'm Still In Love With You)"	2	—	Ramblin' Man
1951	"Hey Good Lookin'" b/w "My Heart Would Know"	1	—	Memorial Album
1951	"(I Heard That) Lonesome Whistle"	9	—	Ramblin' Man
1951	"Crazy Heart"	4	—	Memorial Album
1951	"Baby, We're Really In Love" b/w "I'd Still Want You" (from The Unforgettable Hank Williams)	4	—	Honky-Tonkin'
1952	"Honky Tonk Blues" b/w "I'm Sorry For You, My Friend" (from Memorial Album)	2	—	Moanin' The Blues
1952	"Half As Much" b/w "Let's Turn Back The Years" (from The Unforgettable Hank Williams)	2	—	Memorial Album
1952	"Jambalaya (On the Bayou)" b/w "Window Shopping" (from The Spirit Of Hank Williams)	1	20	Honky-Tonkin'
1952	"Settin' The Woods On Fire"	2	—	Memorial Album
1952	"You Win Again"	10	—	Memorial Album
1952	"I'll Never Get Out Of This World Alive" b/w "I Could Never Be Ashamed of You" (from Memorial Album)	1	—	Honky-Tonkin'
"—" denotes releases that did not chart

== Posthumously released singles ==
Year	Single (A-side, B-side) Both sides from same album except where indicated	Peak chart positions		Album
Year	Single (A-side, B-side) Both sides from same album except where indicated	US Country	US	Album
1953	"Kaw-Liga"	1	—	Memorial Album
1953	"Your Cheatin' Heart"	1	—	Memorial Album
1953	"Take These Chains from My Heart" b/w "Ramblin' Man"	1	—	Ramblin' Man
1953	"I Won't Be Home No More" b/w "My Love For You (Has Turned To Hate)" (from The Unforgettable Hank Williams)	4	—	Honky Tonkin'
1953	"Weary Blues from Waitin'" b/w "I Can't Escape From You" (from Ramblin' Man)	7	—	Moanin' The Blues
1953	"Calling You" b/w "When God Comes and Gathers His Jewels"	—	—	I Saw The Light
1954	"You Better Keep It On Your Mind" b/w "Low Down Blues" (from Moanin' The Blues)	—	—	Honky-Tonkin'
1954	"How Can You Refuse Him Now" b/w "A House Of Gold"	—	—	I Saw The Light
1954	"I'm Satisfied With You" b/w "I Ain't Got Nothin' But Time" (from Honky-Tonkin')	—	—	The Immortal Hank Williams
1954	"(I'm Gonna) Sing, Sing, Sing" b/w "The Angel Of Death"	—	—	I Saw The Light
1955	"Please Don't Let Me Love You" b/w "Faded Love and Winter Roses"	9	—	The Immortal Hank Williams
1955	"Mother Is Gone" b/w "Message to My Mother" (from I Saw The Light)	—	—	The Spirit Of Hank Williams
1955	"A Teardrop On A Rose" b/w "Alone and Forsaken" (from Moanin' The Blues)	—	—	The Spirit Of Hank Williams
1955	"The First Fall Of Snow" b/w "Someday You'll Call My Name" (from Moanin' The Blues)	—	—	The Immortal Hank Williams
1955	"Thank God" b/w "The Battle of Armageddon" (from Wait For The Light To Shine)	—	—	I Saw The Light
1956	"California Zephyr" b/w "Thy Burdens Are Greater Than Mine" (from Wait For The Light To Shine)	—	—	The Immortal Hank Williams
1956	"There's No Room In My Heart For The Blues" b/w "I Wish I Had a Nickel"	—	—	The Immortal Hank Williams
1956	"Singing Waterfall" b/w "Blue Love (In My Heart)"	—	—	Sing Me A Blue Song
1957	"Ready to Go Home" b/w "We're Getting Closer To The Grave Each Day" (Non-album track)	—	—	Wait For The Light To Shine
1957	"Leave Me Alone With The Blues" b/w "With Tears in My Eyes" (from The Immortal Hank Williams)	—	—	The Unforgettable Hank Williams
1957	"The Waltz Of The Wind" b/w "No One Will Ever Know"	—	—	The Immortal Hank Williams
1958	"My Bucket's Got a Hole in It" b/w "We Live In Two Different Worlds" (from The Unforgettable Hank Williams)	—	—	Honky Tonkin'
1958	"Just Waitin'" b/w "Roly Poly" (from The Lonesome Sound Of Hank Williams)	—	—	Beyond The Sunset
1965	"Lovesick Blues" b/w "Your Cheatin' Heart" (from Memorial Album)	—	—	Moanin' The Blues
1965	"Cold, Cold Heart" b/w "The Pale Horse and His Rider" (with Audrey Williams, from Mr. and Mrs. Hank Williams)	—	—	Memorial Album
1966	"I'm So Lonesome I Could Cry" b/w "You Win Again"	43	109	Legend Lives Anew with Strings
1966	"Kaw-Liga" b/w "Let's Turn Back The Years"	—	—	Legend Lives Anew with Strings
1966	"They'll Never Take Her Love from Me" b/w "There'll Be No Teardrops Tonight" (from More Hank Williams & Strings)	—	—	Legend Lives Anew with Strings
1967	"Dear John" b/w "Long Gone Lonesome Blues"	—	—	More Hank Williams & Strings
1968	"(I Heard That) Lonesome Whistle" b/w "Crazy Heart" (from 14 More Of Hank Williams' Greatest Hits Volume II)	—	—	More Hank Williams & Strings
1976	"Why Don't You Love Me" b/w "Ramblin' Man"	61	—	24 Of Hank Williams' Greatest Hits
1989	"There's a Tear in My Beer" (with Hank Williams, Jr.) b/w "You Brought Me Down To Earth" (by Hank Williams Jr., from Wild Streak)	7	—	Hank Williams, Jr.: Greatest Hits, Vol. 3
1996	"Move It On Over" (with Hank Williams, Jr. and Hank Williams III)	—	—	Three Hanks: Men with Broken Hearts
"—" denotes releases that did not chart
