= 40 Greatest Hits (Hank Williams album) =

Greatest hits album by Hank Williams
- Released: 1978
- Recorded: 1947–1952
- Genre: Country; honky-tonk; blues
- Length: 106:59
- Label: Mercury
- Producer: Fred Rose; Wesley Rose

Hank Williams chronology
Hank Williams Treasury (1976)	40 Greatest Hits (1978)	Just Me & My Guitar (1985)

40 Greatest Hits is a two-record greatest hits compilation by American singer-songwriter Hank Williams. It was released in 1978 by Mercury Records – who under PolyGram became responsible for the MGM tape vault – on the 25th anniversary of Williams' death. Significantly, it was the first anthology in quite some time that did not subject Williams' recordings to either rechanneled stereo, posthumous overdubs, artificial duets with family members (like his son Hank Jr.), or most or all of the above. Because of both this, and the value-for-money attraction of having a deeper song selection than single-disc compilations issued previously by MGM Records, many reviewers consider this anthology to be the perfect starting point for newcomers to Williams' recorded legacy. The album remains, to this day, the best-selling record of Williams' career.

== Critical reception ==
Professional ratings
Review scores
Source	Rating
AllMusic	5/5 stars

The album was included in Robert Christgau's "basic record library", published in Christgau's Record Guide: Rock Albums of the Seventies (1981). In 2003, Rolling Stone magazine ranked it at number 94 on a list of The 500 Greatest Albums of All Time, maintaining the rating in a 2012 revised list. In the 2020 reboot of the list, the album's rank dropped to number 132.

== Track listing ==
Except where otherwise indicated, all tracks composed by Hank Williams.

=== Disc one ===
1. "Move It on Over" – 2:43
2. "A Mansion on the Hill" (Fred Rose/Hank Williams) – 2:33
3. "Lovesick Blues" (Cliff Friend/Irving Mills) (*) – 2:42
4. "Wedding Bells" (Arthur Q. Smith) sold to Claude Boone – 2:53
5. "Mind Your Own Business" – 2:53
6. "You're Gonna Change (Or I'm Gonna Leave)" – 2:55
7. "Lost Highway" (Leon Payne) – 2:40
8. "My Bucket's Got a Hole in It" (Clarence Williams) – 2:31
9. "I'm So Lonesome I Could Cry" – 2:45
10. "I Just Don't Like This Kind of Living" – 2:46
11. "Long Gone Lonesome Blues" – 2:36
12. "My Son Calls Another Man Daddy" (Hank Williams/Jewell House) – 2:32
13. "Why Don't You Love Me (Like You Used to Do)" – 2:22
14. "Why Should We Try Anymore" – 2:36
15. "They'll Never Take Her Love from Me" (Leon Payne) – 2:47
16. "Moanin' the Blues" – 2:25
17. "Nobody's Lonesome for Me" – 2:30
18. "Cold, Cold Heart" – 2:45
19. "Dear John" (Tex Ritter/Aubrie Gass) – 2:35
20. "Howlin' at the Moon" – 2:41

=== Disc two ===
1. "I Can't Help It (If I'm Still in Love with You)" – 2:25
2. "Hey, Good Lookin'" – 2:55
3. "Crazy Heart" (Maurice Murray/Fred Rose) – 2:29
4. "(I Heard That) Lonesome Whistle" (Jimmie Davis/Hank Williams) – 2:28
5. "Baby, We're Really in Love" – 2:34
6. "Ramblin' Man" – 3:04
7. "Honky Tonk Blues" – 2:12
8. "I'm Sorry for You, My Friend" – 2:43
9. "Half as Much" (Curley Williams) – 2:44
10. "Jambalaya (On the Bayou)" – 2:54
11. "Window Shopping" (Marcel Joseph) – 2:33
12. "Settin' the Woods on Fire" (Ed G. Nelson/Fred Rose) – 2:38
13. "You Win Again" – 2:37
14. "I'll Never Get Out of This World Alive" (Hank Williams/Fred Rose) – 2:27
15. "Kaw-Liga" (*) – 2:35
16. "Your Cheatin' Heart" – 2:43
17. "Take These Chains from My Heart" (Fred Rose/Hy Heath) – 2:40
18. "I Won't Be Home No More" – 2:45
19. "Weary Blues from Waitin'" – 2:38
20. "I Saw the Light" (*) – 2:43

== Technical details ==
- Most titles recorded at Castle Recording Laboratory, Nashville, Tennessee.
- "Lovesick Blues", "My Bucket's Got A Hole In It", "I'm So Lonesome I Could Cry" and "I Just Don't Like This Kind Of Living" recorded at Herzog Recording Studios, Cincinnati, OH.
- Digital preparation and transfers from best available mono sources: Tom Ruff and Tim Rogers at Polygram Studios
- Digital preparation and transfers from 78 RPM discs (where noted with (*)): Alan Stoker and Tim Rogers at Country Music Foundation

== Technical personnel ==
- Tony Byworth – album compiler, liner notes
- Ted Jensen – CD mastering
