= Please Make Up Your Mind =

Single by Hank Williams (a.k.a. "Luke the Drifter")
- A-side: "Be Careful of Stones that You Throw"
- Released: 1952
- Recorded: July 11, 1952
- Studio: Castle Studio, Nashville
- Genre: Country,
- Length: 2:48
- Label: MGM 11309
- Songwriter: Hank Williams
- Producer: Fred Rose

Hank Williams (a.k.a. "Luke the Drifter") singles chronology
"Ramblin' Man" (1951)	"Please Make Up Your Mind" (1952)

"Please Make Up Your Mind" (a.k.a. "Why Don't You Make Up Your Mind?") is a song written and recorded by Hank Williams and released as a "Luke the Drifter" single in 1952.

== Background ==
Little Jimmy Dickens had been the first to release "Please Make Up Your Mind" to the Canadian market under the title "I Wish You Didn't Love Me So Much," but Dickens' version was up-tempo and included a line not found in Williams' version:

The preacher man said, "For better or worse"
But lately I've been lookin' for that big black hearse

Williams version, however, has a different feel altogether and was almost certainly aimed at his former wife Audrey Williams, whom he had legally divorced the day before the recording session. Country music historian Colin Escott calls it the most "rivetingly vengeful" song the singer ever recorded:

"Over a slow blues backing and with bleak humor, Hank catalogued his grievances against Audrey: her tantrums, her attempts to belittle him, her ungovernable temper...Not until Bob Dylan's 'Positively 4th Street' was there a song so bitter and demeaning."

According to Escott, the original draft contained the lines, "Whoever said women was the weaker sex/ Baby never had you on his neck," but, like lines in the Dickens version, were cut, with producer Fred Rose possibly deeming them too dark for commercial release. The song's blunt subject matter and spoken vocal ensured it to be released as a "Luke the Drifter" recording, the pseudonym for Hank's atypical releases that let jukebox operators know they were not danceable, honky tonk records. It was recorded at Castle Studio in Nashville with Jerry Rivers (fiddle), Don Helms (steel guitar), and Harold Bradley (rhythm guitar), while it is speculated that Chet Atkins played lead guitar and Ernie Newton played bass. The track also appeared on the 1953 LP Hank Williams as Luke the Drifter. This recording session, held on July 11, 1952, was Hank's next-to-last and also produced the single's B-side "Be Careful of Stones that You Throw" as well as "You Win Again."

== Bibliography ==
- Escott, Colin (2004). Hank Williams: The Biography. Back Bay. ISBN 0-316-73497-7.
