= Pictures from Life's Other Side =

Single by Luke The Drifter
- A-side: "Ramblin' Man"
- Released: December 1951
- Recorded: June 1, 1951
- Studio: Castle Studio, Nashville
- Genre: Country
- Length: 2:49
- Label: MGM 11120
- Songwriter: Traditional
- Producer: Fred Rose

Luke The Drifter singles chronology
"I Dreamed About Mama Last Night / I've Been Down That Road Before" (1951)	"Pictures from Life's Other Side" (1951)	"Be Careful of Stones that You Throw" (1952)

"Pictures from Life's Other Side" is a traditional song popularized by Hank Williams under the pseudonym "Luke the Drifter." It was released on MGM Records in 1951.

== Background ==
The exact origins of "Pictures from Life's Other Side" are disputed. Some researchers date the song back to around 1880 and cite a singing-school teacher from Athens, Georgia, named John B. Vaughan as its composer, while others credit Charles E. Baer. Regardless, the song was well known; early country singers Vernon Dalhart and Bradley Kincaid had already recorded it and Woody Guthrie cut a version of it in 1944. The song, an appeal for compassion and understanding for the downtrodden, recounts three "scenes," the second of which is sometimes excluded: the first that of a degenerate gambler who dies right after staking his dead mother's wedding ring during a card game, his "last earthy treasure,"; the second that of "two brothers, whose pathway so diff'rent had led": one becomes wealthy, while the other one "begged for his bread" and unwittingly kills his brother (the rich man) in a robbery; and the last that of a "heartbroken mother" who drowns herself and her baby by jumping into a river. The song is primarily associated with country singer Hank Williams, who recorded it under the name Luke the Drifter, an alter ego created by Williams and producer Fred Rose to let jukebox operators know that these heavily moralistic recitations that Williams wanted to release were not typical Hank Williams honky tonk singles; the pseudonym made it clear that the operators should not stock up on the releases like they usually did. Williams's version was recorded in Nashville on June 1, 1951. He was backed by Jerry Rivers (fiddle), Don Helms (steel guitar), Sammy Pruett (electric guitar), Jack Shook (rhythm guitar), Ernie Newton or "Cedric Rainwater," a.k.a. Howard Watts (bass), and possibly Owen Bradley (organ). The song was the lead track on the 1954 LP Hank Williams as Luke the Drifter.
