= No, No, Joe =

Single by Hank Williams (aka "Luke the Drifter")
- B-side: "Help Me Understand"
- Published: September 29, 1950 Milene Music
- Released: 1950
- Recorded: August 31, 1950
- Studio: Castle Studio, Nashville
- Genre: Country, Gospel
- Length: 2:26
- Label: MGM 10806
- Songwriter: Fred Rose
- Producer: Fred Rose

Hank Williams (aka "Luke the Drifter") singles chronology
"Everything's Okay/Too Many Parties and Too Many Pals" (1950)	"No, No, Joe" (1950)	"Just Waitin'" (1951)

"No, No, Joe" is a song by Hank Williams. It was written by Fred Rose and takes aim at Soviet leader Joseph Stalin.

== Background ==
Country music has a long tradition of upholding conservative values and patriotism, and by the 1950s, with the Cold War heating up, several country singers had already recorded pro-American, anti-Communist songs. Roy Acuff, arguably Williams' biggest musical influence, recorded "Advice to Joe" while Elton Britt had recorded "The Red We Want Is the Red We've Got in the Old Red, White and Blue." Producer Fred Rose composed the novelty "No, No, Joe," which, despite Hank's wry delivery, made its point. At the time of its release, Billboard commented, "Tune and material carefully wedded, not forced like so many of the recent patriotic tunes." Perhaps because of the song’s political nature, Rose opted to issue the single under Williams' pseudonym "Luke the Drifter," an alias used for the darker recitations that Williams wanted to release. The song was cut in Nashville on August 31, 1950, with Rose producing. Williams was backed by Jerry Rivers (fiddle), Don Helms (steel guitar), Sammy Pruett (electric guitar), Jack Shook (rhythm guitar), Ernie Newton or Howard Watts (bass) and Owen Bradley or Fred Rose (organ).

MGM chose not to include "No, No, Joe" on the 1953 LP Hank Williams as Luke the Drifter, and it would not see release on an LP until it appeared on a Time-Life set in 1981. The song would be included with the other Luke the Drifter songs on the 2001 reissue.

== Bibliography ==
- Escott, Colin (2004). Hank Williams: The Biography. Back Bay. ISBN 0-316-73497-7.
