= Hank Williams as Luke the Drifter =

Studio album by Hank Williams
- Released: 1953
- Recorded: January 1950–July 1952
- Studio: Castle Studio, Nashville, Tennessee
- Genre: Country, talking blues, spoken word, gospel
- Length: 40:21
- Label: MGM
- Producer: Fred Rose

Hank Williams chronology
Memorial Album (1953)	''Hank Williams as Luke the Drifter'' (1953)	Honky Tonkin' (1954)

Hank Williams as Luke the Drifter is an LP by Hank Williams released by MGM Records in 1953. It features narrations that Williams released under the pseudonym Luke the Drifter.

== Background ==
Spoken word, moralistic narrations and talking blues had always been a tradition in country music and were still commercially viable in the late 1940s; T. Texas Tyler's narration of "Deck of Cards" became one of the best selling records of 1948. Still, Williams' producer Fred Rose remained dubious:

"Rose's objection was rooted in commercial logic: jukebox operators had huge standing orders for Hank Williams records and, if the recitations were issued under Hank's name, the operators would complain. Virtually all of the operators serviced bars, and the last thing they needed was for someone to punch up a Hank Williams record and get a sermon."

Rose and Williams settled on the pseudonym "Luke the Drifter." No attempt was made to hide the fact that Hank was Luke the Drifter, and the singer would play along; on his radio shows he would say, "And here's a number by one of my closest relatives, Luke the Drifter,' or he'd say, "Here's one by my half brother." Williams' insistence on doing the material, which he must have known would not result in hits, speaks to his artistry; in the episode of American Masters dedicated to the singer, his grandson Hank Williams III states, "While Hank was at the peak of his career, he had another side to him that he wanted to get out, and that side was called Luke the Drifter. And a lot of people didn't understand the Luke the Drifter side. That's a dark side, man." In the same documentary, songwriter Danny Dill confirms, "He was fascinated by the dark side of life." Luke the Drifter became a kind of alter ego for Williams, with country music historian Colin Escott observing in his essay for the 2001 Polygram album Hank Williams as Luke the Drifter: Beyond the Sunset, "If Hank could be headstrong and willful, a backslider and a reprobate, then Luke the Drifter was compassionate and moralistic, capable of dispensing all the wisdom that Hank Williams ignored."

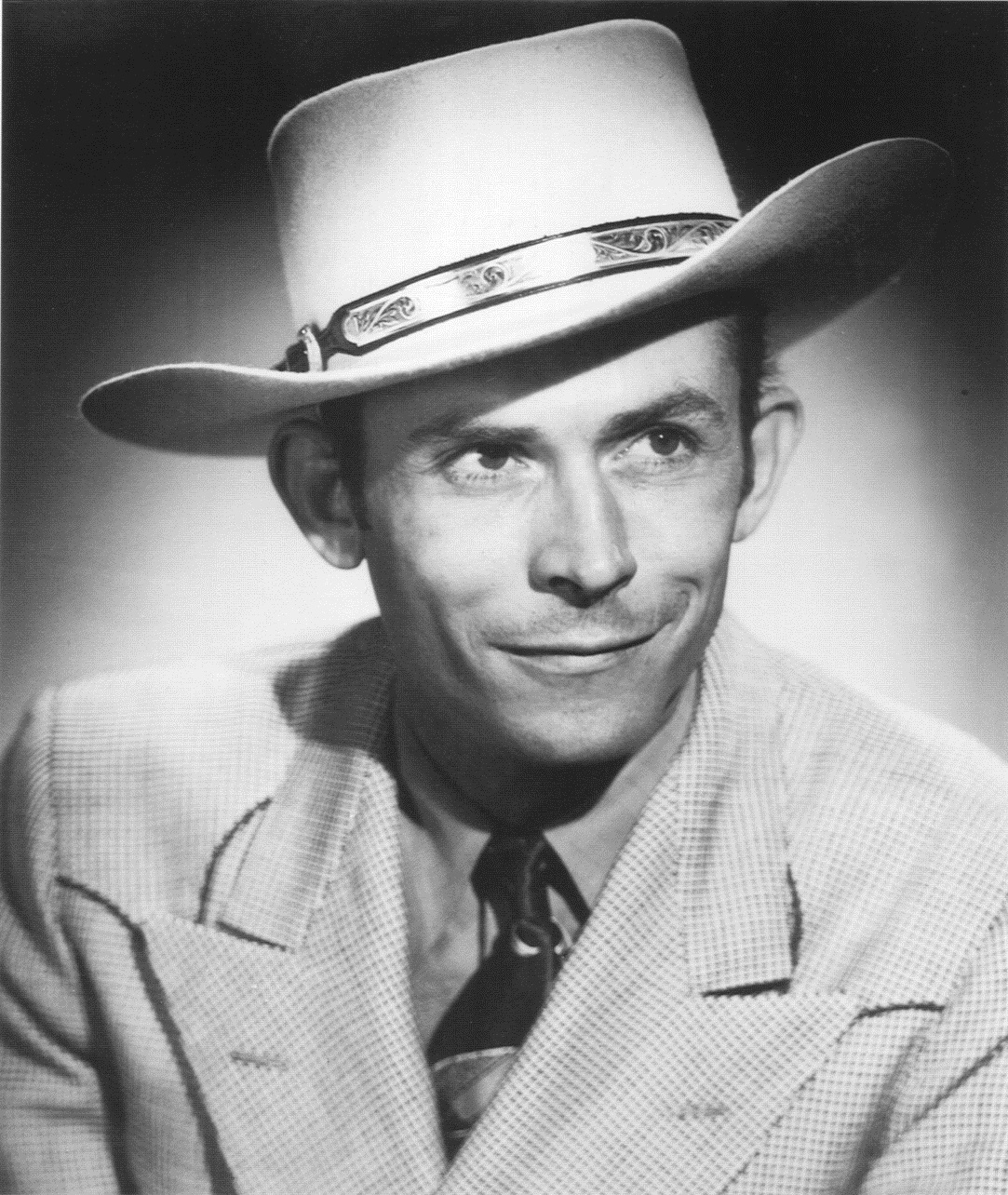
Hank Williams

== Recording and composition ==
The Luke the Drifter songs were recorded at various sessions between January 1950 and July 1952 at Castle Studio in Nashville with Fred Rose producing. Williams' immense popularity and unflagging commercial success left Rose and MGM no choice but to indulge his wish to record the recitations, and the first session, held on January 10, 1950, produced four songs: "Too Many Parties and Too Many Pals," "Beyond the Sunset," "The Funeral," and "Everything's Okay." Although credited to Williams, "The Funeral" had existed for years as a poem written by Will Carleton and recounts a black child's funeral. Although "uncomfortably patronizing by today's standards," there is no hint of anything other than sincerity in Hank's delivery. While the Luke the Drifter recordings are primarily associated with sad songs, they also included wry compositions about love and even politics; on August 31, 1950, Williams recorded the anti-Stalin novelty "No, No, Joe," which had been written by producer Fred Rose as a warning to the Russian leader as the Cold War began gaining momentum. In addition, "Just Waitin'" and "I've Been Down That Road Before" are witty commentaries on the peculiarities of human behavior. One number composed by Williams, "Please Make Up Your Mind," was likely directed at his wife Audrey Williams; their tempestuous marriage would end in divorce in 1952, and the songs sound like pleas of reconciliation. Williams also covered the Bonnie Dodd narration "Be Careful of Stones that You Throw," which takes aim at small-town gossip based on the social mores of the time; the song recounts the heroic act of a young lady who is killed while saving a child from a passing car, the same child whose mother had previously ostracized her.

Williams recorded three songs under the guise of Luke the Drifter that are considered classics: "Ramblin' Man," "Pictures from Life's Other Side," and "Men with Broken Hearts." The latter was a song of which its composer was extremely proud; in the liner notes to the 2001 Mercury album Beyond the Sunset, Williams is quoted asking journalist Allen Rankin, "Ain't that the awfulest, morbidest song you ever heard in your life? Don't know how I happen to write that thing, except that somebody that fell, he's the same man as before he fell, ain't he?" In the American Masters film, Danny Dill recalls, "He was simply overwhelmed by that song, 'Men with Broken Hearts.' And it was so sad, it was awful! But he loved it." The arrangement of "Pictures from Life's Other Side" is credited to Williams but some researchers date it to around 1880 and cite a singing-school teacher from Athens, Georgia named John B. Vaughan as its composer, while others credit Charles E. Baer. Regardless, the song was well known; Woody Guthrie cut a version of it in 1944. Perhaps the most well known Luke the Drifter song is "Ramblin' Man," a rare, minor key dirge that features a taut, edgy vocal from Williams as he sings about wanderlust and loneliness. His keening falsetto and Harold Bradley's steel guitar echoed the song's sentiments, but it also contained a folk edge atypical for a Hank Williams recording.

== Reception ==
Bruce Eder of AllMusic wrote: "for those unfamiliar with them, the songs are all well-chosen and they work within the context of devotional and cautionary songs, Williams easily slipping into this mode of performance, usually with a gospel organ accompaniment and very understated steel guitar - the one mood-breaker, much closer to Williams' secular material, is the upbeat, dark-humored, almost comical 'Everything's Okay,' which basically holds that 'we're still a-livin'/so everything's okay.'"

In his autobiography Chronicles: Volume One, Bob Dylan stated: "the Luke the Drifter record, I just about wore out. That's the one where he sings and recites parables, like the Beatitudes. I could listen to the Luke the Drifter record all day and drift away myself, become totally convinced in the goodness of man."

== Track listing ==
All tracks composed by Hank Williams; except where indicated.

1. "Pictures from Life's Other Side" (Traditional; arrangement by Hank Williams) – 2:49
2. "Men with Broken Hearts" – 3:08
3. "Help Me Understand" – 2:54
4. "Too Many Parties and Too Many Pals" (Billy Rose, Mort Dixon, Ray Henderson) – 2:58
5. "Please Make Up Your Mind" – 2:48
6. "I've Been Down That Road Before" – 2:54
7. "Be Careful of Stones that You Throw" (Bonnie Dodd) – 2:57
8. "I Dreamed About Mama Last Night" (Fred Rose) – 2:59
9. "The Funeral" – 3:03
10. "Beyond the Sunset" (Blanche Kerr Brock, Virgil P. Brock, Albert Kennedy Rowswell) – 2:58
11. "Just Waitin'" (Hank Williams, Bob Gazzaway) – 2:38
12. "Everything's Okay" – 2:48
13. "No, No, Joe" (Fred Rose) – 2:26
14. "Ramblin' Man" – 3:01

== Bibliography ==
- Escott, Colin (2004). Hank Williams: The Biography. Back Bay. ISBN 0-316-73497-7.
