= You Win Again (Hank Williams song) =

Single by Hank Williams With His Drifting Cowboys
- A-side: "Settin' the Woods on Fire"
- Published: September 3, 1952 Acuff-Rose Publications
- Released: September 1952
- Recorded: July 11, 1952
- Studio: Castle Studio, Nashville
- Genre: Country
- Length: 2:36
- Label: MGM 11318
- Songwriter: Hank Williams
- Producer: Fred Rose

Hank Williams With His Drifting Cowboys singles chronology
"Jambalaya (On the Bayou)" (1952)	"You Win Again" (1952)	"I'll Never Get Out of This World Alive" (1952)

"You Win Again" is a 1952 song by Hank Williams. In style, the song is a blues ballad and deals with the singer's despair with his partner. The song has been widely covered, including chart successes by Tommy Edwards and Charley Pride.

== Background ==
Hank Williams recorded "You Win Again" on July 11, 1952—one day after his divorce from Audrey Williams was finalized. Like "Cold, Cold Heart," the song was likely inspired by his tumultuous relationship with his ex-wife, as biographer Colin Escott observes:

It might have been no more than coincidence, but, in the absence of hard evidence to the contrary, the songs cut that day after Hank's divorce seem like pages torn from his diary...Its theme of betrayal had grown old years before Hank tackled it, but, drawing from his bottomless well of resentment, he gave it a freshness bordering on topicality.

In Williams' original draft, the song had been titled "I Lose Again" but was reversed at producer Fred Rose's insistence. The song's memorable opening line, "The news is out all over town," begins the story of an utterly defeated narrator who cannot bring himself to leave his love despite her infidelities. It was recorded at Castle Studio in Nashville with Jerry Rivers (fiddle), Don Helms (steel guitar), and Harold Bradley (rhythm guitar), while it is speculated that Chet Atkins played lead guitar and Ernie Newton played bass.

"You Win Again" was released as the B-side to "Settin' the Woods on Fire", primarily because up-tempo, danceable numbers were preferable as A-sides for radio play and for the valuable jukebox trade. Nonetheless, "You Win Again" peaked at number ten on the Most Played in C&W Juke Boxes chart, where it remained for a single week.

== Cover versions ==
- Pop singer Tommy Edwards released the song for MGM on the same day as Williams and it rose to number 13 on the pop charts in the fall of 1952.
- The song was covered by the Grateful Dead on numerous occasions, most notably on their album Europe '72.
- In 1980, Charley Pride had his 24th number one country hit with his version.

== General and cited sources ==
- Escott, Colin; Merritt, George; MacEwen, William (2004). Hank Williams: The Biography. New York: Little, Brown.
