= I Could Never Be Ashamed of You =

1952 single by Hank Williams

Single by Hank Williams With His Drifting Cowboys
- A-side: "I'll Never Get Out of This World Alive"
- Published: October 31, 1952 Acuff-Rose Publications
- Released: November 1952
- Recorded: September 23, 1952
- Studio: Castle Studio, Nashville
- Genre: Country, blues
- Length: 2:43
- Label: MGM 11366
- Songwriter: Hank Williams

Hank Williams With His Drifting Cowboys singles chronology
"Settin' the Woods on Fire" (1952)	"I Could Never Be Ashamed of You" (1952)	"Kaw-Liga" (1953)

"I Could Never Be Ashamed of You" is a song written and recorded by Hank Williams. It was released as the B-side of "I'll Never Get Out of This World Alive" on MGM Records in November 1952.

== Background ==
"I Could Never Be Ashamed of You" is widely regarded as a song Hank Williams wrote for Billie Jean Jones Eshlimar, whom he married on October 18, 1952, in Minden, Louisiana. In the episode of American Masters about Hank's life, singer Billy Walker explained, "Billie Jean was Faron Young's girlfriend. Faron had just moved to Nashville. Billie Jean and Faron was out clubbin' around and Hank Williams joined them. And they went to the lavatory and Hank pulled out a gun on Faron and said, "Boy, this is gonna be my girlfriend from now on." In the same film, Ray Price, who shared an apartment with Williams, recalls Hank using Billie Jean as leverage to try and win back his ex-wife Audrey Williams: "He told Audrey, 'If you don't come back to me I'm gonna marry Billie Jean.' Well, Audrey said, 'Go ahead.'"

Williams cut the song at his last recording session in Nashville at Castle Studio with Fred Rose producing. By this point, the singer had been fired from the Grand Ole Opry for drunkenness and had returned to Shreveport to play the Louisiana Hayride. Although he was in terminal decline, the quality of the songs Williams recorded at his final session was astonishing: "I Could Never Be Ashamed of You," "Take These Chains From My Heart," "Kaw-Liga," and "Your Cheatin' Heart." As biographer Colin Escott marvels, "Most singers hope to hang their careers on one or two classics; Hank cut four classics between 1:30 and 3:40 on the afternoon of September 23, 1952..." Williams was backed by Tommy Jackson (fiddle), Don Helms (steel guitar), Chet Atkins (lead guitar), Jack Shook (rhythm guitar), and Floyd "Lightnin'" Chance (bass). A demo version of Williams singing the song with just his guitar, likely recorded in 1951, is also available.

== Cover versions ==
- George Hamilton IV recorded the song on ABC Records in 1958.
- Jerry Lee Lewis recorded the song for Sun Records in 1957.
- Johnny Cash cut the song for Sun records on May 15, 1958.
- Ferlin Husky covered the song in 1961 for Capitol Records.
- The song appears on George Jones' 1962 LP My Favorites of Hank Williams.
- Ernest Tubb recorded the song for Decca in 1968.
- Glen Campbell cut the song in 1973.
- Charlie Pride recorded it for his 1980 album There's a Little Bit of Hank in Me on RCA.
- Moe Bandy released a version in 1983.
- Hank Williams 3 covered the song on special edition of Straight to Hell.

== Bibliography ==
- Escott, Colin (2004). Hank Williams: The Biography. Back Bay. ISBN 0-316-73497-7.
- Koon, George William (1983). Hank Williams, so lonesome. University of Mississippi press. ISBN 978-1-57806-283-6.
