= Help Me Understand (Hank Williams song) =

Single by Hank Williams (aka "Luke the Drifter")
- A-side: "No, No, Joe"
- Released: 1950
- Recorded: August 31, 1950
- Studio: Castle Studio, Nashville
- Genre: Country, Gospel
- Length: 2:54
- Label: MGM 10806
- Songwriter: Hank Williams
- Producer: Fred Rose

Hank Williams (aka "Luke the Drifter") singles chronology
"Everything's Okay/Too Many Parties and Too Many Pals" (1950)	"Help Me Understand" (1950)	"Just Waitin'" (1951)

"Help Me Understand" is a song written by Hank Williams and released under the name "Luke the Drifter" on MGM Records in 1950.

== Background ==
Williams' Luke the Drifter recordings were often characterized by bleak recitations and "Help Me Understand" is no exception, addressing the theme of divorce and specifically the effect it has on the children growing up in broken homes. "One word led to another," Hank sings, "and the last word led to divorce," a line that would be all too prescient for the singer, who would be divorced from his wife Audrey Williams in 1951. Audrey actually cut the song for Decca five months before Williams recorded it, and the pair would perform the song as a two-part piece; Hank would narrate while Audrey would sing the little girl's part, what country music historian Colin Escott deems "a rare occasion when her tuneless singing actually worked." Williams cut his version in Nashville on August 31, 1950, with Fred Rose producing. He was backed by Jerry Rivers (fiddle), Don Helms (steel guitar), Sammy Pruett (electric guitar), Jack Shook (rhythm guitar), Ernie Newton or Howard Watts (bass) and Owen Bradley or Fred Rose (organ).

David Allan Coe covered the song on his 1997 LP The Ghost of Hank Williams.
