= Men with Broken Hearts =

Single by Hank Williams (aka "Luke the Drifter")
- A-side: "Just Waitin'"
- Published: February 16, 1951 Acuff-Rose Publications
- Released: April 1951
- Recorded: December 21, 1950
- Studio: Castle Studio, Nashville
- Genre: Country, Gospel
- Length: 3:08
- Label: MGM 10932
- Songwriter: Hank Williams
- Producer: Fred Rose

Hank Williams (aka "Luke the Drifter") singles chronology
"No, No, Joe" (1950)	"Men with Broken Hearts" (1951)	"I Dreamed About Mama Last Night / I've Been Down That Road Before" (1951)

"Men with Broken Hearts" is a song written and recorded by Hank Williams under the pseudonym "Luke the Drifter." It was released on MGM Records in 1951.

== Background ==
"Men with Broken Hearts" was a song of which its composer was extremely proud; in the liner notes to the 2001 Mercury album Hank Williams as Luke the Drifter: Beyond the Sunset, he is quoted asking journalist Allen Rankin, "Ain't that the awfulest, morbidest song you ever heard in your life? Don't know how I happen to write that thing, except that somebody that fell, he's the same man as before he fell, ain't he?" In the American Masters film, Danny Dill recalls, "He was simply overwhelmed by that song, 'Men with Broken Hearts.' And it was so sad, it was awful! But he loved it." The song, like most of the Luke the Drifter recordings, is a recitation, and Hank's delivery, infused with compassion and sadness, gives it a moral authority that is immediately arresting and would influence countless singers from George Jones to Bob Dylan. Williams recorded the song on December 21, 1950, at Castle Studio in Nashville - the same session that produced "Cold, Cold Heart" - with Fred Rose producing. He was backed by Jerry Rivers (fiddle), Don Helms (steel guitar), Sammy Pruett (electric guitar), Chet Atkins (rhythm guitar), Ernie Newton or Howard Watts (bass). It was released as a single in 1951 with "Just Waitin'" as the A-side.

== Cover versions ==
- Jim Reeves covered the song for RCA in 1961.
- A film clip of Hank's ex-wife Audrey Williams reciting the song is widely available.
- Buddy Ebsen recorded the song for Reprise.
- Ferlin Husky recorded the song for Capitol in 1964.
- Porter Wagoner cut the song for RCA in 1966.
- Hank Williams, Jr. recorded a version in 1970. It later became the title of the 1995 album Three Hanks: Men with Broken Hearts, containing overdubbed duets with Hank Sr., Hank Jr., and Hank III.
- Johnny Cash performed a rendition of the song on his ABC television show.
- In August 1970 in Las Vegas, Elvis Presley spoke a few lines from "Men with Broken Hearts" as an introduction to the song "Walk a Mile in My Shoes" (as can be heard on the 1995 box set Walk a Mile in My Shoes: The Essential '70s Masters).
- Sneezy Waters sang a slightly different version of the song in the 1980 film Hank Williams: The Show He Never Gave.
- Stompin Tom Connors also recorded a version of the song on his Roads of Life album in 2012.
