= Beyond the Sunset (song) =

Single by Hank Williams aka "Luke the Drifter"
- B-side: "The Funeral"
- Released: 1950
- Recorded: January 9, 1950
- Studio: Castle Studio, Nashville
- Genre: Country, Country blues, Gospel
- Length: 2:58
- Label: MGM 10630
- Songwriters: Blanche Kerr Brock, Virgil P. Brock, and Albert Kennedy Rowswell
- Producer: Fred Rose

Hank Williams aka "Luke the Drifter" singles chronology
"Beyond the Sunset" (1950)	"Everything's Okay/Too Many Parties and Too Many Pals" (1950)

"Beyond the Sunset" is a song written by Blanche Kerr Brock, Virgil P. Brock, Ola Smithson Oatley and Albert Kennedy Rowswell. It was released as a single by Hank Williams under the pseudonym Luke the Drifter in 1950.

== Background ==
The recitation in "Beyond the Sunset" was originally a poem called "Should You Go First" by Albert "Rosey" Rowswell, the voice of the Pittsburgh Pirates for more than twenty years, and later first put to the 1936 hymn "Beyond the Sunset" by West Virginian performer Chickie Davis. Elton Britt released a version before Williams in February 1950. Country music historian Colin Escott calls the song "pure Victoriana caught out of time." Williams recorded the song in Nashville at Castle Studio at the first Luke the Drifter session on January 9, 1950, with Fred Rose producing. He was backed on the session by Don Helms (steel guitar), Hillous Butrum (bass), and probably Owen Bradley or Rose (organ). It was released as a single in 1950 as the B-side to "The Funeral" and also appeared on the 1953 posthumous LP, Hank Williams as Luke the Drifter.

== Other versions ==
- Jo Stafford and Gordon MacRae included the song on their album Memory Songs (1955).
- Pat Boone's version was issued in 1959 on the EP "Hymns We Love".
- Lonnie Donegan - recorded the song in 1960.
- Ernie Haase & Signature Sound version on George Younce with Ernie Haase & Signature Sound (2011) with George Younce recitation of "Should you go first and I remain."
