= I Can't Help It (If I'm Still in Love with You) =

1951 single by Hank Williams with His Drifting Cowboys

Single by Hank Williams With His Drifting Cowboys
- A-side: "Howlin' at the Moon"
- Published: April 25, 1951 Acuff-Rose Publications
- Released: May 1951
- Recorded: March 16, 1951
- Studio: Castle Studio, Nashville
- Genre: Hillbilly, Honky-tonk
- Length: 2:26
- Label: MGM 10961
- Songwriter: Hank Williams
- Producer: Fred Rose

Hank Williams With His Drifting Cowboys singles chronology
"Ramblin' Man" (1951)	"I Can't Help It (If I'm Still in Love with You)" (1951)	"Hey Good Lookin'" (1951)

"I Can't Help It (If I'm Still in Love with You)" is a song written and originally recorded by Hank Williams on MGM Records. It hit number two on the Billboard country singles chart in 1951. In his autobiography, George Jones printed the first six lines of the song and stated, "Its lyrics couldn't be more simple - or profound."

== Recording and composition ==
According to Colin Escott's 2004 book Hank Williams: The Biography, fiddler Jerry Rivers always claimed that Hank wrote the song in the touring sedan, and when he came up with the opening line, "Today I passed you on the street," and then asked for suggestions, steel guitarist Don Helms replied, "And I smelled your rotten feet." The song was recorded at Castle Studio in Nashville, Tennessee, on March 16, 1951, and issued as MGM catalog No. 10961.

Williams was backed on the session by members of his Drifting Cowboys band, including: Rivers, Helms, Sammy Pruett (electric guitar), Jack Shook (rhythm guitar), Ernie Newton or "Cedric Rainwater" a.k.a. Howard Watts (bass), and either Owen Bradley or producer Fred Rose on piano. It was released as the B-side of "Howlin' at the Moon", but on the strength of its simple language and passionate singing, soared to number two on the Billboard Country Singles chart.

Williams sang the song with Anita Carter on the Kate Smith Evening Hour on April 23, 1952. The rare television appearance is one of the few film clips of Williams in performance.

== Chart performance ==
Chart (1951)	Peak position
U.S. Billboard Hot Country Singles	2

== Notable cover versions ==
Many artists have covered the song. Among the most successful are the following:

- Guy Mitchell's 1951 version peaked at No. 28 on Billboard charts.
- Rick Nelson included a rendition of the song on his third studio album, 1959's Ricky Sings Again, which went to number one on Cashbox. He subsequently performed it on a 1959 episode of The Adventures of Ozzie and Harriet entitled, "The Treasurer's Son" (S07•E27).
- On the last studio album recorded before her death, 1962's Sentimentally Yours, Patsy Cline performed two of Hank Williams's landmark songs, one of which is "I Can’t Help It (If I’m Still in Love with You)". In its review of the album, AllMusic writes, "What she and the musicians do with the numbers by Hank Williams is nothing short of a revelation".
- Johnny Tillotson's 1962 rendition reached No. 24 on the U.S. Billboard Hot 100, No. 8 on the Adult Contemporary chart, and No. 23 in Canada.
- Skeeter Davis recorded the track in 1965. Her version was released as a single and peaked at number 26 on the U.S. Billboard Bubbling Under Hot 100 singles chart the same year.
- Linda Ronstadt covered the song on her 1974 album Heart Like a Wheel, reaching No. 2 on the U.S. Billboard Hot Country Singles chart. Her version won her the 1976 Grammy Award for Best Country Vocal Performance, Female.
