= The Funeral (Hank Williams song) =

Single by Hank Williams aka "Luke the Drifter"
- A-side: "Beyond the Suset"
- Released: 1950
- Recorded: January 9, 1950
- Studio: Castle Studio, Nashville
- Genre: Country, Gospel
- Length: 3:03
- Label: MGM 10630
- Songwriter: Hank Williams
- Producer: Fred Rose

Hank Williams aka "Luke the Drifter" singles chronology
"The Funeral" (1950)	"Everything's Okay/Too Many Parties and Too Many Pals" (1950)

"The Funeral" is a song credited to Hank Williams with words from Will Carleton. It was released as a single under the pseudonym Luke the Drifter by MGM Records in 1950.

== Background ==
Although credited to Williams, "The Funeral" had existed for years as a poem written by Will Carleton and recounts a black child's funeral. T. Texas Tyler, who had scored a big hit with the recitation "Deck of Cards" in 1948, had recorded a version of the song titled "Colored Child's Funeral" around the same time as Williams recorded it, as did East Coast deejay Buddy Starcher. It is one of the few Hank Williams recordings that has not aged well, as biographer Colin Escott observes:

"By today's standards, 'The Funeral' was an uncomfortably patronizing account of a black child's funeral service. Originally a poem by Will Carleton, it was first published in August 28, 1886 in Harper's Weekly. Unlike Starcher and Tyler, though, Hank delivered 'The Funeral' in his regular voice, and was clearly extending every ounce of compassion within him. His sincerity, though, was undermined by the words..."

Williams recorded the song in Nashville at Castle Studio at the first Luke the Drifter session on January 9, 1950 with Fred Rose producing. He was backed on the session by Don Helms (steel guitar), Hillous Butrum (bass), and probably Owen Bradley or Rose (organ) Guitarist Bob McNett, who attended the session, later recalled that both Williams and Don Helms had tears in their eyes after they had finished recording: "'The Funeral' really touched him. When he did it, he lost himself in it." It was released as a single in 1950 with "Beyond the Sunset as the B-side. It also appeared on the 1953 posthumous LP Hank Williams as Luke the Drifter.

== Bibliography ==
- Escott, Colin (2004). Hank Williams: The Biography. Back Bay. ISBN 0-316-73497-7.
