= I've Been Down That Road Before =

Single by Hank Williams (aka "Luke the Drifter")
- A-side: "I Dreamed About Mama Last Night"
- Published: July 9, 1951 Acuff-Rose Publications
- Released: 1951
- Recorded: June 1, 1951
- Studio: Castle Studio, Nashville
- Genre: Country, Gospel
- Length: 2:54
- Label: MGM 11017
- Songwriter: Hank Williams
- Producer: Fred Rose

Hank Williams (aka "Luke the Drifter") singles chronology
"Just Waitin'" (1951)	"I've Been Down That Road Before" (1951)	"Ramblin' Man" (1951)

"I've Been Down That Road Before" is a talking blues song by Hank Williams. It was released by MGM Records under the name "Luke the Drifter", which was a pseudonym for Hank's recitations. It was another dose of the sage advice that Luke the Drifter seemed endlessly capable of dispensing: and Hank Williams seemed just as capable of ignoring. Biographer Colin Escott calls it "perhaps the most directly biographical song he ever wrote, and leaves us guessing at the incidents that inspired it." He recorded it in Nashville on June 1, 1951, with Fred Rose producing and backing by Jerry Rivers (fiddle), Don Helms (steel guitar), Sammy Pruett (electric guitar), Jack Shook (rhythm guitar), Ernie Newton or "Cedric Rainwater", aka Howard Watts (bass), and possibly Owen Bradley (organ).
