= Too Many Parties and Too Many Pals =

Single by Hank Williams aka Luke the Drifter
- A-side: "Everything's Okay"
- Released: 1950
- Recorded: January 10, 1950
- Studio: Castle Studio, Nashville
- Genre: Country, country blues, gospel
- Length: 2:58
- Label: MGM 10718
- Songwriters: Billy Rose, Mort Dixon, Ray Henderson
- Producer: Fred Rose

Hank Williams aka Luke the Drifter singles chronology
"Beyond the Suset" (1950)	"Too Many Parties and Too Many Pals" (1950)	"No, No, Joe" (1950)

"Too Many Parties and Too Many Pals" is a song released by Hank Williams under the pseudonym Luke the Drifter. The song dates back to at least 1926 when it was recorded by a number of artists including the Bar Harbor Society Orchestra. It had also previously been recorded and released in 1948 by Bill Haley as Bill Haley and the 4 Aces of Western Swing; this was Haley's first professionally released single.

== Background ==
"Too Many Parties and Too Many Pals" was written by Tin Pan Alley songwriter Billy Rose with New York City songwriters Mort Dixon and Ray Henderson, and had already been recorded by one of the first singing cowboys, Carl T. Sprague, as the "Wayward Daughter". The song contains the testimony of a man defending a "social enemy, a lady of the evening" who is on trial for her promiscuous ways. Williams biographer Colin Escott deems it "a morality play in one mercifully short act..." The song contains a similar theme as Hank's own "Men with Broken Hearts" but, like "The Funeral", somehow lacks the down-to-earth gravitas that characterized his own lyrics. Williams recorded the song in Nashville at Castle Studio at the first Luke the Drifter session on January 10, 1950, with Fred Rose producing. He was backed on the session by Don Helms (steel guitar), Hillous Butrum (bass), and probably Owen Bradley or Rose (organ).

== Bibliography ==
- Escott, Colin (2004). Hank Williams: The Biography. Back Bay. ISBN 0-316-73497-7.
