= Settin' the Woods on Fire =

1952 song written by Fred Rose and Ed G. Nelson

Single by Hank Williams With His Drifting Cowboys
- B-side: "You Win Again"
- Published: July 29, 1952 Milene Music
- Released: September 1952
- Recorded: June 13, 1952
- Studio: Castle Studio, Nashville
- Genre: Country & Western, Honky-tonk, Country blues, proto-rockabilly
- Length: 2:35
- Label: MGM 11318
- Songwriters: Fred Rose, Edward Nelson
- Producer: Fred Rose

Hank Williams With His Drifting Cowboys singles chronology
"Jambalaya (On the Bayou)" (1952)	"Settin' the Woods on Fire" (1952)	"I'll Never Get Out of This World Alive" (1952)

"Settin' the Woods on Fire" is a song by Hank Williams, released as the A-side in September 1952. The song reached number 2 on U.S. Billboard Most Played by Jockeys chart and number 2 on the National Best Sellers chart.

== Background ==
"Settin' the Woods on Fire" was written by Williams' song publisher and producer Fred Rose and an elderly New Yorker, Ed G. Nelson. Williams recorded it with Rose producing at Castle Studio on June 13, 1952, in Nashville, with Jerry Rivers (fiddle), Don Helms (steel guitar), and Harold Bradley (rhythm guitar), while it is speculated that Chet Atkins played lead guitar and Ernie Newton played bass. The song peaked at number 2, while the B-side, "You Win Again," climbed to number 10. Author Colin Escott offers that the song "pointed unerringly toward rockabilly".

== Cover versions ==
- Frankie Laine and Jo Stafford released a duet in 1952.
- Jerry Lee Lewis recorded an unissued version of the song for Sun Records in 1958.
- Johnny Burnette released a version in 1958.
- George Jones covered the song for his 1960 album George Jones Salutes Hank Williams.
- Porter Wagoner recorded it on his 1963 LP A Satisfied Mind.
- Mason Proffit recorded it for their 1973 album Bareback Rider.
- Chris LeDoux recorded the song on his Western Underground album in 1991.
- The Tractors recorded the song for their 1994 eponymous debut album.
- Matchbox recorded the song for their 1978 album Settin' the Woods on Fire.
- Delbert McClinton recorded the song in 2022 on his album "Outdated Emotion"

== Chart performance ==
Chart (1952)	Peak position
U.S. Billboard Hot Country Singles	2
