= Just Waitin' =

Single by Hank Williams (aka "Luke the Drifter")
- B-side: "Men with Broken Hearts"
- Published: February 16, 1951 Acuff-Rose Publications
- Released: April 1951
- Recorded: December 21, 1950
- Studio: Castle Studio, Nashville
- Genre: Country, Gospel
- Length: 2:38
- Label: MGM 10932
- Songwriters: Hank Williams, Bob Gazzaway
- Producer: Fred Rose

Hank Williams (aka "Luke the Drifter") singles chronology
"No, No, Joe" (1950)	"Just Waitin'" (1951)	"I Dreamed About Mama Last Night / I've Been Down That Road Before" (1951)

"Just Waitin" is a song written by Hank Williams and released as the A-side of "Men with Broken Hearts" in 1951 on MGM Records. It was released under the pseudonym "Luke the Drifter."

== Background ==
Many of the singles Williams wanted to release were somber recitations that contained dark subject matter unsuitable for the honky tonks that stocked his releases on their jukeboxes. The Luke the Drifter alias let the juke operators know which singles were what amounted to moralistic sermons. However, not all the Luke the Drifter songs were necessarily maudlin, such as "Just Waitin'," a talking blues that Hank adapted from an idea from a musician named Bob Gazzawy from Happy, Texas. The whimsical song ponders the futility of human expectations and contains humorous, cynical wordplay like, "The congregation's waitin' for the preacher, preacher just waitin' for the groom, the groom's just waitin' for the June bride, and bride's just waitin' for June." Williams biographer Colin Escott takes a dim view of the song, stating that it "promised more than it delivered...It was a good premise, but a bad song." Williams recorded it on December 21, 1950, in at Castle Studio in Nashville - the same session that produced "Cold, Cold Heart" - with Fred Rose producing. He was backed by Jerry Rivers (fiddle), Don Helms (steel guitar), Sammy Pruett (electric guitar), Chet Atkins (rhythm guitar), Ernie Newton or Howard Watts (bass). MGM released "Just Waitin'" again with Williams' unreleased version of "Roly Poly" as the B-side in 1958.
