= Ramblin' Man (Hank Williams song) =

1951 song by Hank Williams

Single by Luke the Drifter
- B-side: "Pictures from Life's Other Side"
- Published: September 7, 1951 Acuff-Rose Publications
- Released: December 1951
- Recorded: June 1, 1951
- Studio: Castle Studio, Nashville
- Genre: Country, blues
- Length: 2:49
- Label: MGM 11120
- Songwriter: Hank Williams
- Producer: Fred Rose

Luke the Drifter singles chronology
| "I Dreamed About Mama Last Night / I've Been Down That Road Before" (1951) | "Ramblin' Man" (1951) | "Be Careful of Stones that You Throw" (1952) |

"Ramblin' Man"

Single by Hank Williams With His Drifting Cowboys
- A-side: "Take These Chains from My Heart"
- Released: April 1953
- Recorded: June 1, 1951
- Label: MGM 11479
- Songwriter: Hank Williams
- Producer: Fred Rose

"Ramblin' Man" is a song written in 1951 by Hank Williams. Initially released in December 1951 as one of Williams' "Luke the Drifter" singles, it was re-released as the B-side to the posthumous 1953 number one hit "Take These Chains from My Heart", as well as to the 1976 re-release of "Why Don't You Love Me". It is also included on the 40 Greatest Hits, a staple of his CD re-released material.

== Background ==
"Ramblin' Man" is one of Williams' few minor key compositions and is sung rather than spoken, unlike the other recitations he recorded as "Luke the Drifter," an alter ego created by Williams and producer Fred Rose to let jukebox operators know that the heavily moralistic recitations were not typical Hank Williams honky tonk singles. The song is notable for the simplicity of its structure, relying upon a 2-chord, minor-key, rhythm guitar figure and alternating minimal accompaniment from fiddle and steel guitar. It also features Williams' trademark "yodel." The song's three verses, all ending in the title line, are sung straight through with no pause for instrumental solos. The song tells the story of a man trapped in his drifting ways, doomed to break his lover's heart. Tales of wanderers were a common theme for Williams, and consequently, country music as a whole. The haunting spectre of the train - also a recurring image in many of Hank's compositions - is prominent. Country music historian Colin Escott speculates that the folk undertones of the recording may not have been accidental because the Weavers' hit version of Lead Belly's "Goodnight Irene" "had sparked a short-lived folk music craze, and it's possible that Hank saw the folk craze as an opportunity for Luke the Drifter." Williams' version was recorded in Nashville with Fred Rose producing on June 1, 1951. He was backed by Jerry Rivers (fiddle), Don Helms (steel guitar), Sammy Pruett (electric guitar), Jack Shook (rhythm guitar), Ernie Newton or "Cedric Rainwater," aka Howard Watts (bass), and possibly Owen Bradley (organ).

The song should not be confused with Ray Pennington's song "I'm a Ramblin' Man", originally recorded in 1967 and subsequently covered by Waylon Jennings, who recorded a version in 1974.

== Cover versions ==
- Frankie Laine covered the song in 1953.
- Michael Holliday covered the song in 1957 on a Columbia EP SEG 7752. <https://www.45cat.com/record/seg7752>
- Ronnie Hawkins covered the song for Roulette in 1960.
- Williams' ex-wife Audrey Williams recorded the song for her LP Ramblin' Gal on Decca.
- Del Shannon cut the song in 1964.
- Dick Dale recorded a version of the song.
- Steve Young covered the song on his 1975 album Honky Tonk Man.
- Boxcar Willie recorded it in 1979.
- Hank Williams Jr. recorded two versions for MGM and cut the song again in 1980 for Curb. He also references the song in his own composition "Whiskey Bent and Hell Bound."
- The Residents covered the song on their 1986 album Stars & Hank Forever, a double tribute to Willams and John Philip Sousa.
- The chorus is quoted verbatim in Slint's song "Nosferatu Man" from their 1991 album Spiderland.
- Don Williams cut the song for Pulse in 1999.
- The Dead Brothers covered the song on their 2000 album Dead Music for Dead People.
- Williams' grandson, Hank Williams III, performed the song with The Melvins on the 2000 album The Crybaby.
- Albert Kuvezin and Yat-Kha covered the song on their 2005 album Re-Covers.
- The song was released as a single in 2005 by Isobel Campbell and Mark Lanegan, and was also included on their 2006 album Ballad of the Broken Seas.
- Tom Waits performed the song in concert on his 2006 American tour.
- The song was also covered by Cat Power on the 2008 album Jukebox
- During a 2008 live performance at the Eden Sessions festival, The Raconteurs used the opening lines of Ramblin' Man as an introduction for their song Blue Veins
- Strawfoot covers this song on their 2009 release How We Prospered
- Mark Eitzel covers this song on his 2010 release Brannan Street
- Hayseed Dixie covers this song on their 2010 release Killer Grass
- Ash Grunwald covered the song on his 2012 album, Trouble's Door

== In popular culture ==
- The song features in Sam Shepard's 1980 play, True West, playing in the intermission at the close of Act I.
