= Be Careful of Stones that You Throw =

Single by Hank Williams (aka "Luke the Drifter")
- B-side: "Why Don't You Make Up Your Mind"
- Released: 1952
- Recorded: July 11, 1952
- Studio: Castle Studio, Nashville
- Genre: Country
- Length: 2:57
- Label: MGM 11309
- Songwriter(s): Bonnie Dodd
- Producer(s): Fred Rose

Hank Williams (aka "Luke the Drifter") singles chronology
"Ramblin' Man" (1951)	"Be Careful of Stones that You Throw" (1952)

"Be Careful of Stones that You Throw" is a song recorded by Hank Williams. It was written by Bonnie Dodd.

== Background ==
Bonnie Dodd was a steel guitar player who wrote Tex Ritter's 1945 hit "You Will Have to Pay" and had been recording herself since 1937. The cautionary "Be Careful of Stones that You Throw" was in the tradition of moralizing recitations that Williams was releasing under the Luke the Drifter name; the song recounts the heroic act of a young lady who is killed while saving a child from a passing car, the same child whose mother had previously ostracized her. It was recorded at Castle Studio in Nashville with Jerry Rivers (fiddle), Don Helms (steel guitar), and Harold Bradley (rhythm guitar), while it is speculated that Chet Atkins played lead guitar and Ernie Newton played bass.

== Cover versions ==
- The song was first recorded by Little Jimmie Dickens on October 14, 1949, it is included on later compilations, including The Essential Jimmy Dickens
- Dion recorded the song in 1963, released as a single a-side, Columbia 42810, also on album Donna the Prima Donna
- The Staple Singers recorded it in 1965 for their album Freedom Highway, Epic Records
- Bob Dylan and the Band recorded the song in 1967, as can be heard on The Bootleg Series Vol. 11: The Basement Tapes Complete
- Hank Williams, Jr. recorded the song in 1969, releasing it as a single a-side, and on the album Luke the Drifter Jr. – Vol. 2 for MGM
- David Allan Coe included it on his 1997 LP The Ghost of Hank Williams
- Red Sovine covered the song for Deluxe
- Porter Wagoner recorded the song for RCA
