= I'll Never Get Out of This World Alive =

1952 song written by Fred Rose and Hank Williams

Single by Hank Williams With His Drifting Cowboys
- B-side: "I Could Never Be Ashamed of You"
- Published: October 6, 1952 by Milene Music
- Released: November 1952
- Recorded: June 13, 1952
- Studio: Castle Studio, Nashville
- Genre: Country & Western, Honky-tonk, Country blues
- Length: 2:25
- Label: MGM 11366
- Songwriters: Hank Williams, Fred Rose

Hank Williams With His Drifting Cowboys singles chronology
"Settin' the Woods on Fire" (1952)	"I'll Never Get Out of This World Alive" (1952)	"Kaw-Liga" (1953)

"I'll Never Get Out of This World Alive" is a song written by Fred Rose and American country music singer-songwriter Hank Williams, released by Williams in 1952.

== Background ==
The song was the last single to be released during Williams' lifetime. Co-writer Fred Rose, who died two years after the song's release, played a critical role in the development of Williams' songwriting; as Colin Escott points out, it was up to Rose "to separate the gold from the dross and work with Hank to transform the best ideas into integrated, complete statements, taut with commercial logic. If Rose contributed substantially, as he did on "A Mansion on the Hill" and later "Kaw-Liga," he took half-credit; if he simply doctored Hank's songs, he didn't take a share. Rose knew that he would get the publisher's half of the royalty, and there is consensus that he was not a greedy man."

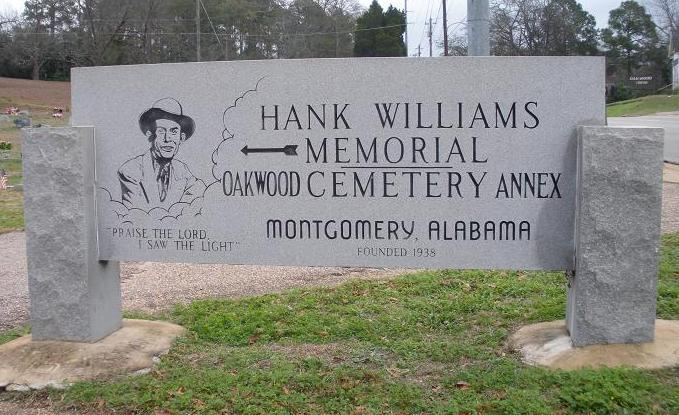
Entrance marker of the Oakwood Annex Cemetery in Montgomery, Alabama

Meant to be a humorous song, as evidenced by its ironic title and chorus, the composition took on additional poignancy following Williams' death early in the first hours of January 1953. Williams recorded the song at Castle Studio in Nashville on June 13, 1952, with backing provided by Jerry Rivers (fiddle), Don Helms (steel guitar), Chet Atkins (lead guitar), Chuck Wright (bass) and probably Ernie Newton (bass). Atkins recalled later, "We recorded 'I'll Never Get Out of this World Alive' and after each take, he'd sit down in a chair. I remember thinking, 'Hoss, you're not jivin',' because he was so weak that all he could do was just sing a few lines, and then just fall in the chair."

== Chart performance ==
"I'll Never Get Out of This World Alive" reached No. 1 on the Billboard Country Singles chart posthumously in January 1953.

=== Hank Williams version ===
Year	Chart	Position
1952	Billboard Country Singles	1

== Cover versions ==
The song has been covered by artists such as

- The Delta Rhythm Boys
- Jimmy Dale Gilmore
- Greg Brown
- Asleep at the Wheel
- Jerry Lee Lewis
- Hank Williams Jr.
- Hank Williams III
- The Little Willies
- Steve Earle released an album titled I'll Never Get Out of This World Alive on April 26, 2011, although only the iTunes album download includes a cover of the song. Earle often covers the song in live performances.
- Entombed A.D.

== In other media ==
- In 1999, the song was used as the theme for the BBC Radio 4 comedy series Married.
- In 2008, Williams' version of the song was used as the theme for the animated comedy series The Life & Times of Tim.
- Steve Earle released his first novel in May 2011, which takes its title from the song and tells the story of a doctor haunted by the ghost of Williams.
- The song was featured during a cutscene in the 2013 video game The Last of Us, in which Ellie reveals to Joel that she stole a cassette tape of the song and the two listen to it while driving.

== Bibliography ==
- Escott, Colin; Merritt, George; MacEwen, William (2004). Hank Williams: The Biography. New York: Little, Brown.
