= 40 Greatest Hits =

40 Greatest Hits may refer to:

- 40 Greatest Hits (Hank Williams album), 1978
- 40 Greatest Hits (Perry Como album), 1975
