= Help Me Understand =

Help Me Understand may refer to:

- Help Me Understand (Trace Adkins song), 2002
- Help Me Understand (Hank Williams song), 1950
