= Jambalaya (On the Bayou) =

1952 single by Hank Williams

Single by Hank Williams With His Drifting Cowboys
- B-side: "Window Shopping"
- Published: July 28, 1952 Acuff-Rose Publications
- Released: July 19, 1952
- Recorded: June 13, 1952
- Studio: Castle Studio, Nashville
- Genre: Country & western, honky-tonk
- Length: 2:52
- Label: MGM K 11283
- Songwriters: Hank Williams; Moon Mullican

Hank Williams With His Drifting Cowboys singles chronology
"Half as Much" (1952)	"Jambalaya (On the Bayou)" (1952)	"Settin' the Woods on Fire" (1952)

Audio sample
- file; help

"Jambalaya (On the Bayou)" is a song written and recorded by American country music singer Hank Williams that was first released in July 1952. It is Williams' most recorded song. Named for a Creole and Cajun dish, jambalaya, it spawned numerous recordings and has since achieved popularity in several different music genres.

In 2002, the 1952 Hank Williams recording of the song on MGM Records was inducted into the Grammy Hall of Fame.

== Composition ==
Williams began writing the song while listening to the Cajuns talk about food on the Hadacol Caravan bus. With a melody based on the Cajun song "Grand Texas", some sources, including AllMusic, claim that the song was co-written by Williams and Moon Mullican, with Williams credited as sole author and Mullican receiving ongoing royalties. Williams' biographer Colin Escott speculates that it is likely Mullican wrote at least some of the song and Hank's music publisher Fred Rose paid him surreptitiously so that he wouldn't have to split the publishing with Moon's label King Records. Williams' song resembles "Grand Texas" in melody only. "Grand Texas" is a song about a lost love, a woman who left the singer to go with another man to "Big Texas"; "Jambalaya", while maintaining a Cajun theme, is about life, parties and stereotypical food of Cajun cuisine. The narrator leaves to pole a pirogue down the shallow water of the bayou, to attend a party with his girlfriend Yvonne and her family. At the feast they have Cajun cuisine, notably Jambalaya, crawfish pie and filé gumbo, and drink liquor from fruit jars. Yvonne is his [ma] "chère amie", which is Cajun French for "my dear (female) friend" or more likely to mean "my girlfriend".

== Recording and release ==
Williams recorded the song on June 13, 1952, his first recording session in six months, at Castle Studio in Nashville with backing provided by Jerry Rivers (fiddle), Don Helms (steel guitar), Chet Atkins (lead guitar), Chuck Wright (bass) and probably Ernie Newton (bass). The recording Williams made differs significantly from Mullican's, which was released in the same month as Williams' version but with a different order of verses and extra rhyming couplets.

Since the original melody of the song was from "Grand Texas", the song is a staple of Cajun culture. However, although Williams kept a Louisiana theme, the song is not a true cajun song, which helped the song gain widespread popularity:

Ethnic music is usually unpalatable for a mass market unless it is diluted in some way (Harry Belafonte's calypsos, Paul Simon's Graceland... the list is endless). The broader audience related to "Jambalaya" in a way that it could never relate to a true cajun two-step led by an asthmatic accordion and sung in patois.

Released in July 1952, it reached number one on the U.S. country charts for fourteen non-consecutive weeks. Williams performed "Jambalaya" at the Louisiana Hayride as part of his "homecoming" in fall, 1952 (after being fired from the Grand Ole Opry). A live recording released as part of a series of Hayride performances includes outbursts of applause. Another unreleased version is included in the 2017 CD set, At the Louisiana Hayride Tonight.

After Williams released his version, Cajuns recorded the song again using Cajun instruments. However, they used Williams' lyrics translated into the Cajun French language. "Jambalaya" remains one of Hank Williams' most popular songs today. International, translated or derived versions exist at least in Chinese, Dutch, Finnish, French, Italian, Polish, German, Spanish, Estonian and Swedish.

A demo version of Williams singing "Jambalaya (On the Bayou)" with just his guitar, likely recorded in 1951, is also available. Williams composed a sequel to the song from the female perspective, "I'm Yvonne (Of the Bayou)", recorded by Goldie Hill. It was not as popular. As with "Jambalaya" there is speculation that Williams may have written this song with Mullican and their friend Jimmy Rule.

== Chart performance ==
Chart (1952)	Peak position
US Billboard Hot Country Singles	1
US Billboard Most Played By Jukeboxes	20

== Other versions ==
Sheet music of "Jambalaya" with Jo Stafford

- It was recorded by Jo Stafford for Columbia Records on July 20, 1952, reaching number 3 on the Billboard pop charts (and making the song well known to people other than country music fans).
- Brenda Lee performed the song in 1956 for Decca Records at the age of eleven. It was her first hit, coming two months after appearing on Ozark Jubilee.
- Fats Domino released the song in late 1961 as a single, peaking at number 30 on the Billboard pop chart.
- The Nitty Gritty Dirt Band's version peaked at number 84 in 1972.
- John Fogerty hit number 16 in 1973 under the name of the Blue Ridge Rangers, and reached number 5 in Canada.
- The Carpenters featured the song, in an uptempo pop version with country flourishes, on their 1973 album Now & Then. Their version was released as a single outside the United States in 1974 and sold well in the UK (peaking at number 12 in the charts) and Japan. It also became the only charting single for Carpenters in Austria peaking at #8. On the New Zealand listener charts it reached number 13.
- In 2003, the Mexican duranguense band K-Paz de la Sierra adapted the song into a Spanish rendition with original lyrics for their debut album Arrasando Con Fuego. The single reached 30 on the U.S. Billboard Hot Latin Tracks.

== See also ==
- Billboard Top Country & Western Records of 1952

== Sources ==
- Escott, Colin; Merritt, George; MacEwen, William (2004). Hank Williams: The Biography. New York: Little, Brown.
