= Jackie Washington =

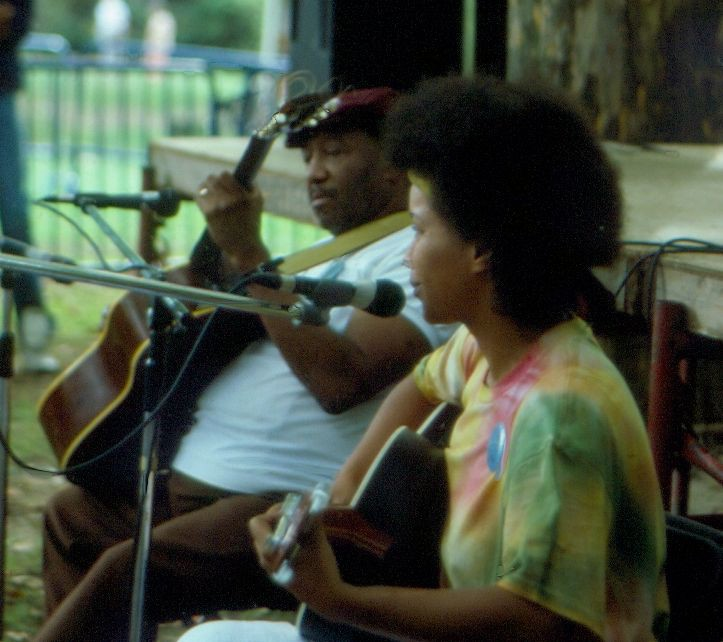
- Jackie Washington, left and Faith Nolan at the Festival of Friends, Hamilton, Ontario, 1987

Background information
- Also known as: Jack
- Born: November 12, 1919; Hamilton, Ontario, Canada
- Origin: Canada
- Died: June 27, 2009 (aged 89) Hamilton, Ontario, Canada
- Genres: Jazz, blues, folk
- Occupation: singer-songwriter
- Instruments: guitar, piano, vocals
- Years active: 1930–2009
- Label: Borealis Records
- Website: web.archive.org/web/20080918052428/http://www.jackiewashington.com:80/

Jackie Washington (November 12, 1919 – June 27, 2009) was a Canadian blues musician.

== Biography ==
He was born and raised in Hamilton, Ontario, the grandson of an African American fleeing slavery, and one of fifteen children born to his parents, Rose and John Washington. Washington became Canada's first black disc jockey in 1948, at CHML in Hamilton. He had his own show on CHML from 1948 to 1950.

Washington came from a large family of musicians, including his brothers Reg (Hammond B3) and Dickie (drums). He began singing in public at the age of five with his brother Ormsby. In the 1930s, he was one of the Washington Brothers, who played clubs and nightspots until his brother's tragic death by drowning. Washington played in various coffeehouses while also working as a railroad porter and later at Fort Erie Race Track. Following a divorce he played far less and was an alcoholic. Following a recovery Washington played with saxophonist Freddie Purser for many years during the 1970s and 1980s at the Windsor and Royal taverns in Hamilton. As a solo artist he appeared at Hamilton`s Festival of Friends a record 29 years. In 1980 Washington played the part of the janitor in the film adaptation of the play: Hank Williams: The Show He Never Gave. He also appeared in the 2005 television documentary: I Want To Be Happy: The Jackie Washington Story.

His first release as a solo blues artist was Blues and Sentimental in June 1976. In addition to his own albums, Washington appeared on recordings by Duke Ellington, Lionel Hampton, Joni Mitchell and Gordon Lightfoot. He had also been a regular performer at many Canadian folk and blues festivals, several of which have named awards in his honour. Washington was well known for having a repertoire of some 1300 blues, folk and jazz songs. A diabetic, he lost a leg to amputation and suffered other health issues, yet continued to perform. His fellow musicians ultimately arranged a living trust starting with a tribute concert at the Tivoli Theatre in Hamilton. Featured artists were Jeff Healey, Garnet Rogers and Tom Wilson among others. Jackie then lived in a retirement home until his death. In accordance with his will, his vast music sheets, photographs and videos were donated to the music department at McMaster University. In 2003, a park in Hamilton was named in his honor. It was located near the neighborhood where he grew up.

He was nominated for a Juno Award in 1993 for Best Roots & Traditional Album, along with Ken Whiteley and Mose Scarlett, for their album Where Old Friends Meet. In 1995 Washington was inducted into Hamilton's Gallery of Distinction. In 2002, he was inducted into the Canadian Jazz & Blues Hall of Fame.

Canadian artist Colin Linden paid tribute to Washington with the song "Jackie Washington", released on the 2003 album BARK by Linden's band Blackie & The Rodeo Kings.

Jackie Washington Rotary Park in the North End of Hamilton was named in his honour in 2003.

== Discography ==
- Blues and Sentimental (Knight II, 1976, review)
- Where Old Friends Meet (Borealis, 1991) (with Mose Scarlett and Ken Whiteley)
- Jackie Washington and Friends in Concert on December 4, 1994 (Sound of Jazz Concerts, 1994)
- Keeping Out of Mischief (Borealis, 1995, reviews)
- Three by Three (Borealis, 1995; foregoing is one of the 3 CDs in this set) (with Mose Scarlett and Ken Whiteley)
- Midnight Choo Choo (Borealis, 1998, reviews)
- We'll Meet Again (Borealis, 1999) (with Mose Scarlett and Ken Whiteley)
- Sitting on a Rainbow (Borealis, 2003) (with Mose Scarlett and Ken Whiteley)

=== Songs in other projects ===
- Mariposa Folk Festival 1976, "In My Solitude" (Mariposa, 1976)

== Awards ==
- 1984 Hamilton Arts Award
- 1986 The Jackie Washington Award: Northern Lights Festival Boreal (NLFB), Sudbury, Ontario, Canada
- 1991 Lifetime Achievement Award, Ontario Arts Council
- 1995 inducted into the Gallery of Distinction, Hamilton, Ontario, Canada
- 1998 Blues with a Feeling Award: Maple Blues Awards (The Toronto Blues Society's Lifetime Achievement Award)
- 2001 Estelle Klein Lifetime Achievement Award, Ontario Council of Folk Festivals
- 2002 inducted into the Canadian Jazz & Blues Hall of Fame
- 2003 honorary Doctorate in Humanities, McMaster University, Hamilton, Ontario

== See also ==
- Strecker, James (1988). Talks with Jackie Washington. Image Publishing. ISBN 978-0-919357-57-0.
- Strecker, James (1996). More Than A Blues Singer: Jackie Washington Tells His Story. Mini Mocho Press. ISBN 978-0-921980-13-1.

== Bibliography ==
- Wilburn, Gene (1998) Northern Journey, 2nd ed.: A Guide to Canadian Folk Music on CD, p. 308-9, ISBN 0-919981-64-X .
