= Hank Williams: The Show He Never Gave =

- Directed by: David Acomba
- Written by: Maynard Collins
- Produced by: Helga Stephenson; Henk Van der Kolk; William T. Marshall
- Starring: Sneezy Waters; Dixie Seatle; Jackie Washington; Sean Hewitt; Sean McCann
- Music by: Hank Williams, Sneezy Waters; Keith Glass - Guitar; Joel Zifkin - Violin; David Harvey - Bass; Ron Dann - Steel Guitar; Peter Beaudoin - Drums
- Release date: December 31, 1980
- Running time: 86 minutes
- Country: Canada
- Language: English
- Budget: CAD$578,000

Hank Williams: The Show He Never Gave is a 1980 Canadian film. It was released by Simcom Limited and made by the Film Consortium Of Canada.

The movie stars Sneezy Waters as Hank Williams Sr. It also stars Dixie Seatle, Sean McCann, Jackie Washington, Joel Zifkin, and Sean Hewitt.

The film was produced by Henk Van Der Kolk and William T. Marshall. Helga Stephenson was the executive producer. It was directed by David Acomba. Maynard Collins wrote it, and it was based on his stage play. The budget was $CAD578,000.

The movie was nominated for "The Tex Ritter Award" at The Country Music 1983 Awards Show. It lost to Tender Mercies. It played at the Toronto Film Festival, the London Film Festival and at FILMEX in Los Angeles, California.

Sneezy Waters sings 23 Hank Williams songs. "Tennessee Waltz", sung by Patti Page, is heard on a jukebox.

Unable to secure music rights for a theatrical release from Acuff-Rose who were concerned about the drugs and alcohol scenes, the film was only shown on television (HBO in the US). The movie was filmed for 6 1/2 days between December 8 and 13, 1980. During rehearsal on December 8, the crew learned that John Lennon had been assassinated. Everyone instantly went down to a vigil held in the square at Toronto City Hall. This news gave the movie a very real sense of melancholy.

While the musical performance and stage banter elements of the film remain true to the original play, director David Acomba was responsible for the overall film adaptation approach situating Hank in his final car ride on New Year's eve 1952 while he imagines an ideal small roadside bar performance. Acomba worked with Collins introducing fictitious characters representing important influences on Hank's music. Although in colour, the desaturated visual style using fixed lenses is intended to evoke an old 50's television kinescope recording - inspired by Hank's last appearance on the Kate Smith Show in March 1952.

Waters changed some of the lyrics of "Too Many Parties", making it about the brother of a lawyer instead of a wayward woman. He added new lyrics to "Men With Broken Hearts" ("And even sleep brings no relief to these men who curse their births/they have no dreams of happiness left in heaven or on earth/for how can men have faith in God when faith in fellow man departs") and rearranged other lyrics.

This movie is available on two DVDs, from White Star and Echo Bridge. Neither contain any extras. Both are full-screen.

== Plot ==
The movie is set on December 31, 1952, and has the country western singer Hank Williams being driven to a concert in Ohio. As he sits in the back seat of the car, he imagines a show he wishes he was giving. In this fantasy show, set in a bar, Williams sings many songs and talks about his personal life and religious philosophies. The movie cuts back and forth from the fictional show to the car. At the end, Williams sings the song "Men With Broken Hearts" to the crowd. He asks them to pray for him and wishes them a happy new year, then he walks out of the bar as bells toll. Back in the car, the real Williams dies. He was only 29 years old.

== Reception ==
Nathan Southern, in The New York Times, wrote that the movie "enables the audience to see directly into the soul of this self-destructive and emotionally beleaguered young man". "Entertainment Weekly" gave the movie a "B+" when it was reviewed on November 27, 1992. Ken Tucker wrote that the film "still fascinates because it taps into the deep melancholy power of its subject" and noted "dark, eerie and atmospheric, this 'Show' is a heartfelt work".
