= Freedom Highway (The Staple Singers album) =

The Staple Swingers

Live album by The Staple Singers
- Released: 1965
- Recorded: 1965
- Genre: Soul
- Label: Epic Records
- Producer: Billy Sherrill

The Staple Singers chronology
Amen (1965)	The Staple Swingers (1965)	Why (1966)

Freedom Highway is a 1965 album by The Staple Singers (Epic LN24163/ BN26163). The title song was written for the 1965 Selma to Montgomery march for voting rights and reflects not only on the actions of the activists but what suffering they had endured to get there, even referencing the murder of Emmett Till at Tallahatchie River. The lyrics begin “March up freedom's highway / March, each and every day.” and continue “Made up my mind / And I won't turn around." Mavis Staples reprised the song in 2008 on Live: Hope at the Hideout, which was released on November 4, 2008, the same day that Barack Obama won the presidential election.

Staples, joined by Jeff Tweedy, performed "Freedom Highway" on the Late Show with Stephen Colbert at Chicago's Auditorium Theater on August 22, 2024, on the occasion of the closing night of the Democratic National Convention.

== Track listing ==
=== 1965 release ===
1. "Freedom Highway" - Pops Staples
2. "What You Gonna Do?"
3. "Take My Hand Precious Lord"
4. "When I'm Gone"
5. "Help Me Jesus"
6. "We Shall Overcome"
7. "When The Saints Go Marching In"
8. "The Funeral"
9. "Build on That Shore"
10. "Tell Heaven"
11. "He's All Right"

=== 2015 release ===
The remastered LP was re-issued as Freedom Highway Complete - Recorded Live at Chicago's New Nazareth Church by Sony in 2015

1. "Intro by Pops Staples"
2. "When The Saints Go Marching In"
3. "The Funeral"
4. "Build On That Shore"
5. "We Shall Overcome"
6. "Freedom Highway"
7. "What You Gonna Do?"
8. "Precious Lord, Take My Hand"
9. "When I’m Gone"
10. "Help Me Jesus"
11. "Rev. Hopkins / Offering"
12. "Jesus Is All"
13. "Samson And Delilah"
14. "View The Holy City"
15. "Tell Heaven"
16. "He’s All Right"
17. "Pops Outro"
18. "Benediction"

=== 1991 compilation ===
A compilation of the same title was released on CD by SBME in 1991 but preserves only two of the original LP tracks. The other tracks are a "hitlist" of favourites from the other albums made for Epic at the same period.

1. "Will the Circle Be Unbroken?" (Ada Ruth Habershon, Charles Hutchinson Gabriel) - 2:37
2. "Move Along Train" (Roebuck Staples) - 2:25
3. "Are You Sure" (Ike Cargill, 1943) - 2:44
4. "Wade in the Water" (J. W. Alexander, Sam Cooke) - 2:57
5. "If I Could Hear My Mother Pray Again" (James Rowe, John Vaughan) - 2:22
6. "Glory, Glory, Hallelujah!" (Traditional; arranged by Roebuck Staples) - 2:20
7. "The Lord's Prayer" (Albert Hay Malotte (1935), arranged by Roebuck Staples) - 3:02
8. "Jacob's Ladder" (A. Smith; arranged by Roebuck Staples) - 2:04
9. "Why? (Am I Treated So Bad)" (arranged by Roebuck Staples) - 2:51
10. "Praying Time" (Traditional; arranged by Roebuck Staples) - 3:03
11. "For What It's Worth" (Stephen Stills) - 2:24
12. "Hammer and Nails" (A. Schroeder, D. Hill) - 2:25
13. "Freedom Highway" (Roebuck Staples) - 2:55
14. "What You Gonna Do?" (arranged by Roebuck Staples) - 2:37
15. "Samson and Delilah" (Traditional; arranged by Roebuck Staples) - 2:33
16. "Nobody's Fault But Mine" (1927) (arranged by Roebuck Staples) - 2:48
17. "Be Careful of Stones that You Throw" (Bonnie Dodd) - 2:48
18. "This Train" (arranged by Roebuck Staples) - 2:38
