= Kaw-Liga =

1952 song by Hank Williams and Fred Rose

- Sheet music cover

Single by Hank Williams with his Drifting Cowboys
- B-side: "Your Cheatin' Heart"
- Published: December 2, 1952 Milene Music
- Released: January 1953
- Recorded: September 23, 1952
- Studio: Castle Studio, Nashville, Tennessee
- Genre: Country, honky-tonk, country blues
- Length: 2:35
- Label: MGM K11416
- Songwriters: Hank Williams, Fred Rose

Hank Williams with his Drifting Cowboys singles chronology
"I'll Never Get Out of This World Alive" (1952)	"Kaw-Liga" (1953)	"Take These Chains From My Heart" (1953)

"Kaw-Liga" (/kɔːˈlaɪdʒə/ kaw-LY-jə) is a country music song written by Hank Williams and Fred Rose.

== Background ==
Hank Williams was from Alabama, and would vacation on Lake Martin. The Lake Martin area was once the home of Kowaliga, a former unincorporated town and a historically African-American community that was active from roughly 1890 until the mid-1920s. When the song was written, it was originally Kowaliga, but Fred Rose changed the spelling to "Kaw Liga". In 1953, "Kowaliga Day" was proclaimed by Alexander City Mayor Joe Robinson.

"Kaw-Liga" is one of just a handful of songs that Williams wrote with Fred Rose, who produced his records and published his songs through his company Acuff-Rose. Rose often "doctored" the songs Williams composed, making suggestions and revisions, with biographer Roger M. Williams (no known relation) noting that Rose's contribution to Williams' songs was probably craftsmanship, whereas Williams' was genius. Roy Acuff later recalled:

Hank would come up with the ideas, and Fred would say, "Well, write it down and let me look at it." Hank'd bring it to Fred, and Fred would sit at the piano and compliment Hank and say, "Maybe you can express this a little differently, let's change it a little bit," but Fred never changed Hank's thinking.

== Content ==
The song tells the story of a wooden Indian, Kaw-Liga, who falls in love with another sculpture in the form of an Indian maid in an antique store, but never tells her how he feels:

Too stubborn to ever show a sign,
Because his heart was made of knotty pine.

Meanwhile, the Indian maid waits for Kaw-Liga to signal his affection for her, but because of his stubbornness, Kaw-Liga's love continues to be unrequited. Hank Williams, the narrator/singer of the song, laments:

Poor ol' Kaw-liga, he never got a kiss,
Poor ol' Kaw-liga, he don't know what he missed,
Is it any wonder that his face is red?
Kaw-liga, that poor ol' wooden head.

The song ends with the Indian maid being purchased and taken away, leaving Kaw-Liga alone:

Kaw-Liga just stands there
As lonely as can be,
And wishes he was still an ol' pine tree.

== Recording and release ==
The song was recorded during Williams' final recording session on September 23, 1952, at Castle Studio in Nashville, Tennessee. The session also produced "I Could Never Be Ashamed of You," (written for his soon-to-be wife Billie Jean), "Take These Chains From My Heart" (also written by Rose), and Williams' signature ballad "Your Cheatin' Heart." ' More than any other song, "Kaw-Liga" bears evidence of the guiding hand of Rose, who molded the song into nothing like Williams had recorded up to that point. It begins in a minor key, which modulates into a major key on the chorus, and also features big-band drummer Farris Coursey, who had played brushes on Williams' previous song "Moanin' the Blues" and played in WSM's dance band. In addition, the song fades out, the only Hank Williams song to do so. Williams is also backed by Tommy Jackson (fiddle), Don Helms (steel guitar), Chet Atkins (lead guitar), Jack Shook (rhythm guitar), and Floyd "Lightnin'" Chance (bass). The single was released posthumously in January 1953 on the MGM Records label and it remained number one on the Billboard country chart for 14 weeks. The flipside, "Your Cheatin' Heart, remained at number one on the country chart for six weeks.

A demonstration version of Williams singing "Kaw-Liga" with just his guitar, likely recorded in 1951, is also available. On the recording, Williams misplays a chord and can be heard muttering "shit" before starting the song again.

The song is featured in two Wes Anderson films: Moonrise Kingdom and Asteroid City.

== Other versions ==
- Marty Robbins included it as the opening track of his self-titled 1958 LP.
- Johnny and the Hurricanes released an instrumental version of the song in 1963.
- The hillbilly comedy duo Homer and Jethro included a parody entitled "Poor Ol’ Koo-liger" on their 1963 album The Humorous Side of Country Music. This album also included a parody of "Your Cheatin’ Heart", which they transformed into "Your Clobbered Heart".
- Del Shannon recorded it for his 1964 album Del Shannon Sings Hank Williams.
- Charley Pride took a live version of the song to number three on the country singles chart in 1969.
- Loretta Lynn recorded it in 1969.
- Roy Orbison recorded it for his tribute album Hank Williams the Roy Orbison Way in 1970.
- Doc Watson recorded a version for his 1974 album Two Days in November.
- Hank Williams's son, Hank Williams Jr., recorded a cover, which peaked at number 12 on the Billboard country singles chart in the summer of 1980. Williams Jr. also performed the song on a television special with Johnny Cash.
- Avant-garde band the Residents recorded the song for their 1986 album Stars & Hank Forever: The American Composers Series, replacing its original backing music with the bassline of Michael Jackson's Billie Jean. This may have been a reference to Williams' wife, who was named Billie Jean.
- Roy Clark and Joe Pass recorded a two-guitar instrumental version for their 1994 album Roy Clark and Joe Pass Play Hank Williams.
- M. H. Benders used it for a poem his 2022 book Gedichten om te Lezen in het Donker.
