= Honey, Do You Love Me, Huh? =

Song by Hank Williams & Curley Williams
- Recorded: 1948 or 1949, Shreveport
- Genre: Country
- Length: 2:12
- Songwriter(s): Hank Williams, Curley Williams

"Honey, Do You Love Me, Huh?" is a novelty song written by Hank Williams and Curley Williams. Curley is best known for writing Hank's smash "Half as Much" but the pair also collaborated on songs, including Honey, Do You Love Me, Huh?" and "No, Not Now." Curley Williams recorded both compositions for Columbia. In the late 1940s, a demo of the two singing the song was recorded in Shreveport.
