= The Log Train =

Song by Hank Williams

Song by Hank Williams
- Recorded: 1952 (Unconfirmed)
- Genre: Country
- Length: 2:22
- Label: MGM
- Songwriter: Hank Williams

"The Log Train" is a song written by American country music singer-songwriter Hank Williams in 1952.

== Background ==
Along with "Alone and Forsaken," "The Log Train" is one of Williams' few compositions that sounds more like a folk song than a country song, with its traditional ballad introduction, "If you will listen, a song I will sing..." Set in Chapman, Alabama, the song is a biographical account of his father Lon's days as an engineer and was recorded at KWKH studio in Shreveport on December 3, 1952, just weeks before his death. Williams' half sister Leila Griffin told American Masters that Lon (to whom Hank bears a remarkable resemblance) married Hank's mother around 1918, but was injured in France during World War I, the experience having shattered him emotionally; he spent ten years in a V.A. hospital and likely influenced Williams more by his absence than anything else. According to the liner notes for the 1990 PolyGram retrospective Hank Williams: The Original Singles Collection, the singer performed the song at a private gathering over Christmas 1952 - a week before his death - and it was the last song anyone remembers hearing him sing.
