= Cold, Cold Heart =

1951 song by Hank Williams

Single by Hank Williams With His Drifting Cowboys
- A-side: "Dear John"
- Written: 1950
- Published: February 16, 1951 Acuff-Rose Publications
- Released: February 2, 1951
- Recorded: December 21, 1950
- Studio: Castle Studio, Tulane Hotel, Nashville
- Genre: Country & Western, Honky-tonk, Country blues
- Length: 2:46
- Label: MGM K10904
- Songwriter: Hank Williams

Hank Williams With His Drifting Cowboys singles chronology
"Moanin' the Blues" (1951)	"Cold, Cold Heart" (1951)	"(I Heard That) Lonesome Whistle" (1951)

"Cold, Cold Heart" is a country music and pop song written and first recorded by Hank Williams. This blues ballad is both a classic of honky-tonk and an entry in the Great American Songbook.

== Hank Williams version ==
Williams adapted the melody for the song from T. Texas Tyler's 1945 recording of "You'll Still Be in My Heart," written by Ted West in 1943.

In the Williams episode of American Masters, country music historian Colin Escott states that Williams was moved to write the song after visiting his wife Audrey in the hospital, who was suffering from an infection brought on by an abortion she had carried out at their home unbeknownst to Hank. Escott also speculates that Audrey, who carried on extramarital affairs as Hank did while he was on the road, may have suspected the baby was not her husband's. Florida bandleader Pappy Neil McCormick claims to have witnessed the encounter:

According to McCormick, Hank went to the hospital and bent down to kiss Audrey, but she wouldn't let him. 'You sorry son of a bitch,' she is supposed to have said, 'it was you that caused me to suffer like this.' Hank went home and told the children's governess, Miss Ragland, that Audrey had a 'cold, cold heart,' and then, as so often in the past, realized the bitterness in his heart held commercial promise.

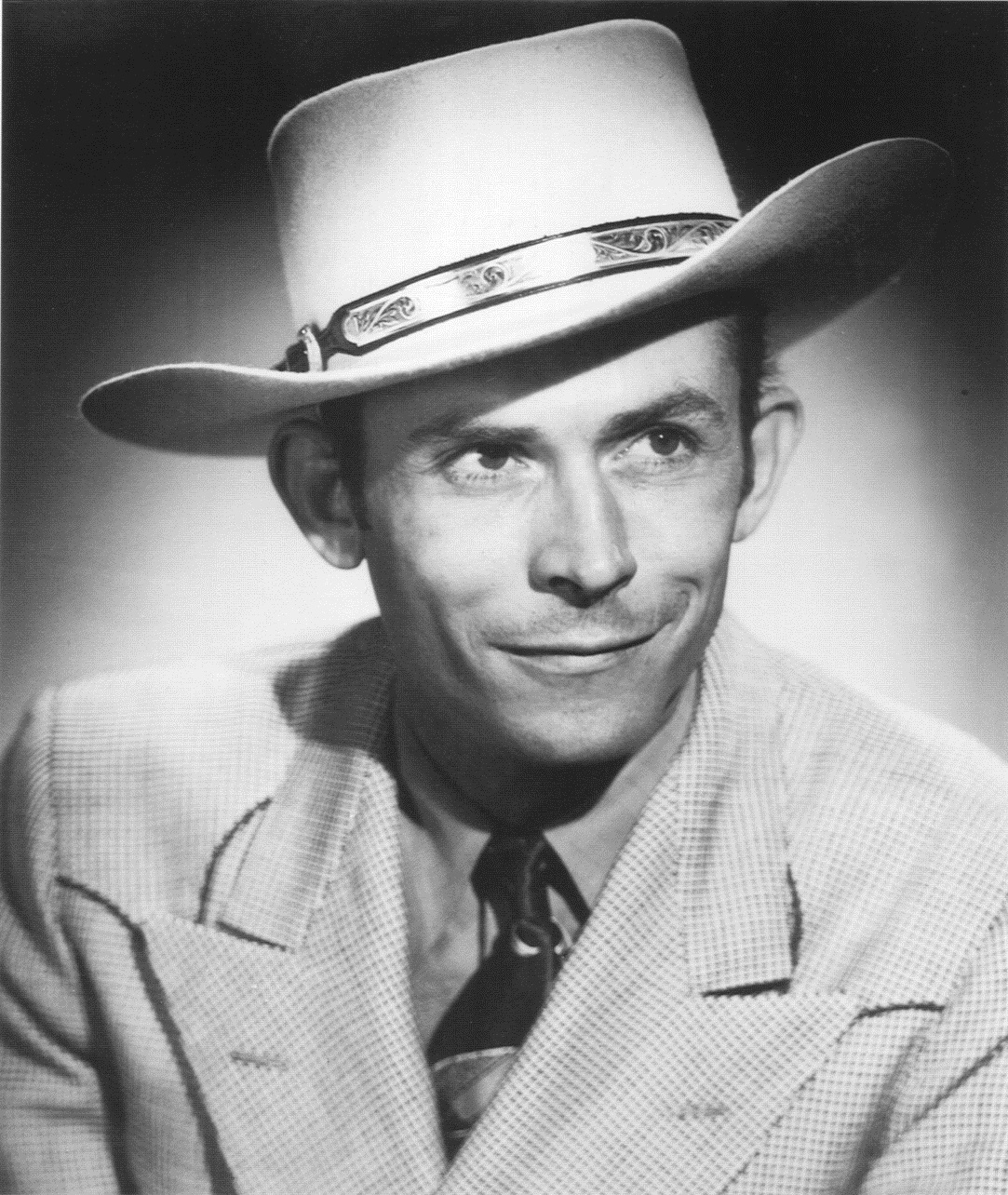
Hank Williams

The first draft of the song is dated November 23, 1950, and was recorded on December 21, 1950, at Castle Studio in Nashville. Williams was backed on the session by members of his Drifting Cowboys band, including Jerry Rivers (fiddle), Don Helms (steel guitar), Chet Atkins (electric guitar), Sammy Pruett (rhythm guitar), Ernie Newton or "Cedric Rainwater", aka Howard Watts (bass), and either Owen Bradley or producer Fred Rose on piano.

Like his earlier masterpiece "I'm So Lonesome I Could Cry," it was released as the B-side (MGM-10904B) to "Dear John" (MGM-10904A), since it was an unwritten rule in the country music industry that the faster numbers sold best. "Dear John" peaked at #8 after only a brief four-week run on Billboard magazine's country music charts, but "Cold, Cold Heart" proved to be a favorite of disc jockeys and jukebox listeners, whose enthusiasm for the song catapulted it to #1 on the country music charts.

Williams featured the song on his Mother's Best radio shows at the time of its release and performed the song on The Kate Smith Evening Hour on April 23, 1952, which ran from September 1951 to June 1952; the appearance remains one of the few existing film clips of the singer performing live. He is introduced by his idol Roy Acuff. Although a notorious binge drinker, Williams appears remarkably at ease on front of the cameras, with one critic noting, "He stared at the camera during his performance of 'Cold, Cold Heart' with a cockiness and self-confidence that bordered on arrogance."

The song would become a pop hit for Tony Bennett, paving the way for country songs to make inroads into the lucrative pop market. In the liner notes to the 1990 Polygram compilation Hank Williams: The Original Single Collection, Fred Rose's son Wesley states, "Hank earned two major distinctions as a songwriter: he was the first writer on a regular basis to make country music national music; and he was the first country songwriter accepted by pop artists, and pop A&R men."

=== Controversy ===
Music journalist Chet Flippo and Kentucky historian W. Lynn Nickell both have asserted that 21-year-old Kentuckian Paul Gilley wrote the lyrics, then sold them to Williams along with the rights, allowing Williams to take credit for it. They also claimed Gilley wrote the lyrics to "I'm So Lonesome I Could Cry" and other songs before drowning at the age of 27. The claims have not been widely accepted. Gilley was asserted as the lyricist of "Cold, Cold Heart" by his alma mater Morehead State University, which published an essay Gilley wrote explaining the hardships of dealing with music publishers (implying this is why he avoided seeking credit) and surmised his inspiration "may have been a referee" Gilley encountered playing basketball.

== Chart performance ==
Chart (1951)	Peak position
United States Billboard Hot Country Singles	1

== Tony Bennett version ==
"Cold, Cold Heart"

Single by Tony Bennett
- B-side: "While We're Young"
- Released: July 2, 1951
- Recorded: May 31, 1951
- Studio: Columbia 30th Street Studio, New York City
- Genre: Pop
- Length: 2:38
- Label: Columbia
- Songwriter: Hank Williams
- Producer: Percy Faith

Tony Bennett singles chronology
"Because of You" (1951)	"Cold, Cold Heart" (1951)	"Blue Velvet" (1951)

That same year, it was recorded in a pop version by Tony Bennett with a light orchestral arrangement from Percy Faith. This recording was released by Columbia Records as catalog number 39449. It first reached the Billboard magazine charts on July 20, 1951, and lasted 27 weeks on the chart, peaking at number 1.

The popularity of Bennett's version has been credited with helping to expose both Williams and country music to a wider national audience. Allmusic writer Bill Janovitz discusses this unlikely combination:

That a young Italian singing waiter from Queens could find common ground with a country singer from Alabama's backwoods is testament both to Williams' skills as a writer and to Bennett's imagination and artist's ear.

Williams subsequently telephoned Bennett to say, "Tony, why did you ruin my song?" But that was a prank – in fact, Williams liked Bennett's version and played it on jukeboxes whenever he could. In his autobiography The Good Life, Bennett described playing "Cold, Cold Heart" at the Grand Ole Opry later in the 1950s. He had brought his usual arrangement charts to give to the house musicians who would be backing him, but their instrumentation was different and they declined the charts. "You sing and we'll follow you," they said, and Bennett says they did so beautifully, once again recreating an unlikely artistic merger.

The story of the Williams–Bennett telephone conversation was often related with mirth by Bennett in interviews and on stage; he continued to perform the song in concert until his retirement. In 1997, the first installment of A&E's Live By Request featuring Bennett (who was also the show's creator), special guest Clint Black performed the song, after which Bennett recounted it. Bennett re-recorded the song as a duet with Tim McGraw for the 2006 album Duets: An American Classic. A Google Doodle featured Bennett's recording of the song on its Valentine's Day doodle in February 2012.

In 2012, Bennett recorded once again "Cold, Cold Heart" in a duet with Argentinian singer-songwriter Vicentico for Viva Duets, a studio album of Bennett in collaboration with Latin American music stars, released in October 2012.

== Notable cover versions ==
- Jazz singer Norah Jones included a sultry swing version on her 2002 album Come Away With Me, which was seen as "re-introducing" modern audiences to the song.
- Singer-songwriter Lucinda Williams earned a nomination for the Grammy Award for Best Female Country Vocal Performance for her cover of the song in 2002.

== Use in media ==
During the credits for the 2013 videogame Batman: Arkham Origins, the Joker, voiced by Troy Baker, can be heard singing the song. Additionally, a DLC featuring Mr. Freeze, which takes place after the events of the main story, is named after the song.

A quest in the 2010 post-apocalyptic open world action-RPG Fallout: New Vegas uses this song as its name.

== Sources ==
- Escott, Colin; Merritt, George; MacEwen, William (2004). Hank Williams: The Biography. New York: Little, Brown.
