= Leave Me Alone with the Blues =

Single by Hank Williams
- A-side: "With Tears in My Eyes"
- Released: 1957
- Recorded: 1949 (Unconfirmed)
- Genre: Country, Gospel
- Length: 2:18
- Label: MGM
- Songwriter(s): Joe Pope

"Leave Me Alone with the Blues" is a song by Hank Williams. The singer recorded it in Shreveport 1949 as a demo or as part of a radio show at KWKH studio and it was released as a posthumous single by MGM Records in 1957. It was composed by Joe Pope and was one of many covers Williams sang on the show.
