= Hillous Butrum =

American singer-songwriter

Hillous Buel "Bew" Butrum (April 21, 1928 – April 27, 2002) was an American country music guitar player and a record and video producer best known as being a member of Hank Williams' Drifting Cowboys.

Hillous Butrum was born in Lafayette, Tennessee. Butrum found his way to Nashville and landed a job at WSM Radio. He eventually wound up a staff musician on the Grand Ole Opry, at age 16. From there, he played bass for Hank Williams' band "The Drifting Cowboys." He would play with the Drifting Cowboys from 1949 until 1950. After the passing of Williams, Butrum joined Hank Snow's band, the Rainbow Ranch Boys, and later played on many Marty Robbins recording sessions. He'd eventually start a music publishing company with Robbins.

He established "Butrum Enterprises Publishing Company" and owned Look Records. He produced many early country music documentaries including "Music City USA". Butrum would tour again, from 1977 to 1984, with the reformed Drifting Cowboys.

Later in life, Butrum became active in the "Reunion of Professional Entertainers," and distributed vintage country music videos through Nashville retail stores and his website.

Hillous Butrum died in his Nashville home about two weeks after the death of his wife Phyllis (Frost) Butrum. His funeral was held in Goodlettsville, Tennessee and was attended by notable music industry figures including Hal Bynum, Merle Kilgore, Bobby Tomberlin, Robbie Wittkowski, Tim Jones, and Don Helms. He was interred in the Underwood Cemetery in his hometown of Lafayette.

The day before Butrum's death, he agreed to an exclusive interview with Country Music Source magazine detailing his long and inspiring music career. The interview was scheduled for April 29, 2002. In lieu of the interview, Country Music Source printed a memoriam for Butrum.
