= Jack Shook =

American guitarist

Jack Shook (born Loren Shook; September 11, 1910 – September 23, 1986) was an American guitarist and a Grand Ole Opry star.

He was a native of Decatur, Illinois. He was raised in Kansas and Missouri.

He started at WSM, Nashville as a staff musician in 1934 and headed the Missouri Mountaineers on the Grand Ole Opry during the later part of the 1930s. He played guitar with many jazz and pop acts of his day including Kate Smith, Bob Crosby, Paul Whiteman and others. In 1939, the Missouri Mountaineers were one of the first Opry acts to be on the NBC Opry radio show called The Prince Albert Show. Shook served in the army during the 1940s and then returned to Nashville to form Jack, Nap and Dee along with singer Dee Simmons. He was a left handed guitarist and was one of the originators of the Nashville sound style of recording.

In 1950, he released the title Written Guarantee with Owen Bradley and His Quintet. Covers by Shook included Birmingham Bounce, Give Me a Little Old Fashioned Love, Goodnight Irene, I'm Moving on, Mule Bookie, Say When, There's a Little White House, and Wabash Blues.

Shook retired from WSM in 1982 and died in Donelson Hospital of cancer in 1986.

He was inducted into the Grand Ole Opry on February 2, 1935.

Shook died of cancer on September 23, 1986, in Nashville, Tennessee.
