= Jerry Rivers =

American fiddle player (1928–1996)

- Born: August 25, 1928; Miami, Florida, United States
- Died: October 4, 1996 (aged 68)
- Occupation: Fiddler
- Years active: 1940s-1990s
- Formerly of: Drifting Cowboys

Jerry Rivers (August 25, 1928 – October 4, 1996) was an American fiddle player.

== Biography ==
Jerry Rivers was born in Miami, Florida. He played fiddle with the Drifting Cowboys, a band who will be forever associated with their "frontman", the legendary Hank Williams.

Raised in Nashville, in a house that would later serve as an office for Atlantic Records, Jerry Rivers took up the fiddle as a teenager and by the mid-1940s, was playing it semi professionally while working during the day as a salesman for an electronic components company. He turned professional, briefly toured with the Short Brothers, and then found himself back in Nashville working with Big Jeff Bess, husband of Hattie Louise "Tootsie" Bess, owner of the famous Tootsie's Orchid Lounge on Music City's Lower Broadway.

While working with Bess, Rivers was first approached by Williams. Although Hank had performed with groups from the mid-1930s on, and following his successful early appearances on the Grand Ole Opry in 1949, he began to see the merits of a permanent backing band.

Despite Williams' status as a rising star, Rivers was not impressed with the financial terms on offer and initially declined. Later, encouraged by his friend, Opry guitarist Jack Boles, he had second thoughts and headed for the radio station WSM, where he found his future boss at the shoe-shine stand.

They briefly talked before Williams grabbed Rivers' instrument and began playing the fiddle standard "Sally Goodin". When he had finished, he challenged the younger man to follow suit while he accompanied on guitar. As Rivers later remembered: "We must have played it for five minutes, then he set down his guitar and I set down the fiddle, and he said, 'Well, anyone (who) can play "Sally Goodin" better 'n me is a darn good fiddle player. You're hired.' "

Rivers cut his first discs with Williams on January 9, 1950, in a session that produced classics including "Long Gone Lonesome Blues", "Why Don't You Love Me?", and "My Son Calls Another Man Daddy". Nicknamed "Burrhead" because of his haircuts, he performed on every major Williams session that followed. Fast becoming one of his best hunting and fishing buddies, Rivers and Williams struck up a friendship, Williams even naming Rivers his personal manager while in Texas.

At the suggestion of Williams' mentor, producer and publisher Fred Rose, he adopted a characteristic double-stop style of bowing: playing the melody and harmony simultaneously on two strings. It was a style that Hank dismissed as "garden seed" fiddle, but one which served Rivers well on many of Williams' greatest recordings, among them: "Moanin' the Blues" (1950), "Cold, Cold Heart" (1950), "I Can't Help It (If I'm Still in Love with You)" (1951), "Hey Good Lookin'" (1951), and "Jambalaya" (1952).

In 1952, tired of Williams' constant drinking and unreliability, the Drifting Cowboys started backing other big-name artists, such as Faron Young and Ray Price. They still played an occasional show with Williams, when he was sober enough, but the closeness of previous years was not renewed.

On New Year's Day, 1953, Rivers was actually scheduled to play in the Canton, Ohio, show with Price, while his friend, Helms, was to play with Williams. The weather was so bad, however, that Rivers was forced to turn back when he reached Louisville, Kentucky. He never made it to the show. Neither did Hank Williams.

Following Williams' death in the early hours of New Year's Day 1953, Rivers and the other Drifting Cowboys had few problems finding work, making valuable contributions to the music of Ray Price and Ferlin Husky, Marty Robbins, and eventually, Hank Williams Jr.

In the early 1960s, Rivers cut a now-rare solo album for Starday, Fantastic Fiddlin' and Tall Tales, which is now available on compact disc as Stories and Great Fiddle Music as Played by Jerry Rivers,) on which he both explains and demonstrates the evolution of various country fiddle styles; in 1964, his biography of Williams, From Life to Legend, was published (revised edition 1980).

In 1976, the Drifting Cowboys reformed for a series of radio shows with the country comic Whitey Ford and enjoyed renewed popularity, especially on the Opry stage and in Britain, where they performed at the Wembley Festival.

Together, they cut a series of albums: A Song for Us All (1979), A Tribute to Hank Williams (1980), Live! (1981), and Classic Instrumentals (1981), before largely retiring to enjoy their status as Nashville icons.

In the 1990s, Rivers and Don Helms toured with Jett Williams, Hank Williams' daughter by Bobbie Jett. He also worked as an agent and talent scout for the powerhouse Buddy Lee Attractions.

Rivers was, with steel guitarist Don Helms, bassist Hillous Butrum, and guitarist Bob McNett, part of a quartet whose work with Williams has given them a special place in the affections of country music fans. That they largely stuck with the most troubled and behaviorally erratic figure in the genre's history is a tribute not only to their patience, but also to the loyalty they felt towards the man they knew as "Bones".

Rivers died on October 4, 1996, of cancer.

== Film depiction ==
Rivers was portrayed by actor Casey Bond in the 2015 biopic film I Saw the Light.
