= Acuff-Rose Music =

Nashville C&W Music Publisher 1942-2002

Acuff-Rose Music, Inc.
- Type: Division
- Industry: Music publishing
- Founded: October 13, 1942; 84 years ago, in Nashville, Tennessee, U.S.
- Founder: Roy Acuff; Fred Rose
- Headquarters: United States
- Parent: Gaylord Entertainment Company (1985–2002); Sony Music Publishing (2002–present)

Acuff-Rose Music, Inc. was an American music publishing firm formed in 1942 by Roy Acuff and Fred Rose in Nashville, Tennessee, United States. Currently, the company's catalog is owned by Sony Music Publishing.

== Early history ==
Acuff-Rose was formed by country music performer Roy Acuff and songwriter Fred Rose, a Nashville music-industry figure known for his talent scouting. At the time, country performers often lost the rights to their compositions to agents, promoters, and record labels. Acuff and Rose established their company under a verbal agreement that "Our company would be honest. The writers would always be taken care of. No one would act in a shady way." Acuff-Rose Publications, Inc. was affiliated with BMI, while Milene Music, Inc. handled music from ASCAP member composers. Both firms initiated business in 1943 with Fred Rose compositions; Acuff-Rose copyrighted four songs under Rose's pseudonym, "Floyd Jenkins," on January 28, and Milene Music published "We Live In Two Different Worlds" that July.

Acuff-Rose was headquartered on 8th Avenue South in the Melrose district of Nashville. Hank Williams demonstrated his songwriting capability to Rose at this location by writing "A Mansion on the Hill" while Rose visited a nearby restaurant. Following his signing, Williams released a series of successful country and pop songs.

== Catalog growth, 1954–1984 ==
Following his father Fred Rose's death in 1954, Wesley Rose became president of Acuff-Rose, leading the company for the next 30 years. He expanded country music internationally by establishing the genre's first overseas publishing offices. During this time, the company signed songwriters including Lefty Frizzell, Felice and Boudleaux Bryant, Roy Orbison, Don Gibson, The Everly Brothers, Mickey Newbury, Dallas Frazier, and Whitey Shafer.

Acuff-Rose also operated Hickory Records until 1987. It still exists as a label of the parent corporation, Sony/ATV, which relaunched the dormant label in 2015.

== Sale to Gaylord Entertainment Group, Sony/ATV ==
Recognizing the frailty of their health and that the company he and Fred Rose had founded in 1942 was in steady decline, Roy Acuff approached Wesley Rose late in 1984 and suggested that it was time to sell the catalog. They did not have to look very far for a buyer. By May 1985, Grand Ole Opry parent company Gaylord Entertainment Company purchased the catalogue for $15 million. The company returned to prominence during this time under the guidance of Music Row veterans Jerry Bradley and Troy Tomlinson and acquired Tom Collins Music. However, finding itself in need of cash in order to complete construction of one of its trademark convention hotels in Texas, Gaylord sold the publishing company to Sony/ATV Music Publishing in 2002 for $157 million. Sony/ATV Music Publishing had previously purchased Acuff-Rose's main Music Row rival, Tree International. The combined catalogs continue to dominate the country music publishing industry. In 2007, Sony/ATV Music Nashville became the first publisher in history to capture BMI Country Music Publisher of the Year, ASCAP Country Music Publisher of the Year, SESAC Country Music Publisher of the Year, and Billboard Country Music Publisher of the Year.

== Campbell v. Acuff-Rose Music, Inc. ==
Acuff-Rose Music was involved in a landmark copyright infringement case in the 1990s: Campbell v. Acuff-Rose Music, Inc. (510 U.S. 569; 1994). In dispute was the use by rap artist Luther Campbell (then using the alias "Luke Skyywalker") and his band 2 Live Crew of a substantial amount of the Roy Orbison hit song "Oh, Pretty Woman" in a parody. Claiming their version of the song fell under the fair use doctrine of the Copyright Act of 1976, 17 U.S.C. 107, Campbell prevailed in the United States district court in Nashville. However, this was reversed at the appellate level by the United States Court of Appeals for the Sixth Circuit. The case was argued before the United States Supreme Court on November 9, 1993. Handing down its ruling on March 7, 1994, the court held that the appellate court placed too much emphasis on the commercial nature of the parody. The opinion of the appellate court was reversed and the case was remanded for further proceedings. Subsequently, the parties agreed to settle the case to avoid further legal expense.
