= Ernie Newton (bass player) =

Ernest F. Newton (November 6, 1908 – October 17, 1976) was an American country music bass player.

== Career ==
Newton was born in Hartford, Connecticut. By the age of five he had been orphaned and he then lived in several children's homes until the age of 15, when he ran away to appear across the US in various Minstrel shows. He worked as a musician on WLS Radio in the Chicago area, recording with “The Hill Toppers” before becoming a regular bassist for Fred Waring’s Pennsylvanians in 1935. It was whilst he was working for Waring that Newton met up initially with Les Paul, becoming an original member of the famed Les Paul Trio along with Jim Atkins (Chet Atkins' brother).

Newton eventually became acquainted with well known singer Red Foley and travelled south to Nashville in 1946 as bass player in Foley’s band “The Foggy River Boys” when Foley was engaged to host the "Prince Albert" segment of the WSM Grand Ole Opry. In Nashville, Newton's reputation for versatility and professionalism landed him a spot as the Opry's "house" bass player and he became one of the most utilised session musicians in the country field of music between the late 1940s to the mid-1950s, featuring on numerous recording sessions at leading Nashville studios.

At a time when drums were effectively taboo in country music, Newton was the first Nashville bassist to develop and master the technique of mounting a drum head to the bass for rhythmic effect when between plucking the strings he would hit the drum head with a brush held in his right hand. As a session man, Newton was prolific and can be heard on many of the most iconic country songs of the period such as I'm So Lonesome I Could Cry and Lost Highway (Hank Williams), Making Believe (Kitty Wells), I'm Moving On (Hank Snow), There Stands the Glass (Webb Pierce), I Forgot More Than You'll Ever Know (The Davis Sisters), Blue Moon Of Kentucky (Bill Monroe 1954) and Man of Constant Sorrow (The Stanley Brothers).

Newton also introduced maracas into country music when he suggested to Johnnie Wright and Jack Anglin (Country duo “Johnnie & Jack” ) that they should differentiate themselves from other similar groups by introducing the instrument into their 1951 song Poison Love. The result was a massive hit for the duo and a great feat of technical skill from Newton who played the bass and maracas simultaneously on the recording.

Outside of music, Newton was a talented golfer and in the late 1950s he chose to curtail his musical career and became a golf professional at a country club in the Nashville area.

Newton died in Nashville, Tennessee on October 17, 1976.
