= Colin Escott =

British music historian and author (born 1949)

- Born: 31 August 1949 (age 77); Boughton Aluph, Kent, England
- Education: University of Kent
- Occupations: Music historian, author

Colin Escott (born 31 August 1949) is a British music historian and author specializing in early U.S. rock and roll and country music. His works include a biography of Hank Williams, histories of Sun Records and The Grand Ole Opry, liner notes for more than 500 albums and compilations, and major contributions to stage and television productions. Honors include multiple Grammy Awards and a Tony Award nomination.

== Career ==
His early career involved stints in operations for Island Records and Polygram Records in the 1970s, followed by work for Universal, Sony/Columbia, Warner Bros.-Rhino, Time Life, Capitol-EMI, RCA, and many independent companies, including Bear Family, Sundazed, and Omnivore. He also wrote music history pieces for various music industry publications including Record Mirror, Goldmine, and Record Hunter.

Described as "the foremost authority on Sun Records", in 1992 he and Martin Hawkins published Good Rockin’ Tonight: Sun Records and the Birth of Rock ‘n’ Roll, the first in-depth account of the label's history. His 1994 book Hank Williams: The Biography was adapted into the 2015 movie I Saw the Light. The multi-CD box set, The Complete Hank Williams, won a 1998 Grammy, and another of his productions, Hank Williams: The Garden Spot Programs, 1950, won a 2014 Grammy.

In 1999 he received a Lifetime Achievement Award from the Association for Recorded Sound Collections, and in 2011 he was recognized with the Charlie Lamb Award for Excellence in Country Music Journalism.

Escott and Floyd Mutrux co-wrote the 2010 musical theater production Million Dollar Quartet, which received three Tony nominations, and in 2020 wrote a sequel, Million Dollar Quartet Christmas. He was also part of the writing/producing team adapting the original show for CMT broadcast in 2017. Another Escott and Mutrux collaboration, Baby It's You!, premiered in 2011.

In 2022 he was tapped as a writer for the "audio adventure" podcast series Tennessee Music Pathways. That same year, he and co-writer Peter Guralnick released "an epic hardcover book", The Birth of Rock 'n' Roll: The Illustrated Story of Sun Records and the 70 Recordings That Changed the World, in conjunction with the film Elvis.

Middle Tennessee State University's Center for Popular Music houses the Colin Escott Collection of historical documents and photographs acquired in 2019.

== Books ==
=== Author ===
- Colin Escott (1994). Hank Williams: The Biography. Boston: Little, Brown and Company. ISBN 978-0316249867.
- —————— (1998). Tattooed on Their Tongues: A Journey Through the Backrooms of American Music. New York: Schirmer Books. ISBN 978-0028650333.
- —————— (2002). Roadkill on the Three-Chord Highway: Art and Trash in American Popular Music. London: Routledge. ISBN 978-0415937825.
- —————— (2003). Lost Highway: The True Story of Country Music. Washington: Smithsonian Press. ISBN 978-1588341495.
- —————— (2006). The Grand Ole Opry: The Making of an American Icon. Nashville: Center Street. ISBN 978-1931722865.

=== Co-author ===
- Colin Escott; Martin Hawkins (1975). Catalyst: The Sun Records Story. Argus Books. ISBN 978-0904619003.
- ———; ——— (1981). Elvis Presley: An Illustrated Discography. Sydney: Omnibus Press. ISBN 978-0825639555.
- ———; ——— (1987). Sun Records: The Discography. Bear Family. ISBN 978-3924787097.
- ———; ——— (1980). Sun Records: The Brief History of the Legendary Recording Label. Quick Fox. ISBN 978-0825631610.
- ———; ——— (1992). Good Rockin' Tonight: Sun Records and the Birth of Rock 'N' Roll. New York: St. Martin's Press. ISBN 978-0312054397.
- Ian Tyson; Colin Escott (1994). I Never Sold My Saddle. Layton, Utah: Gibbs Smith. ISBN 978-0879056131.
- Colin Escott; George Merritt (1996). The Legend of Hank Williams (audiobook). New York: PolyGram.
- Colin Escott; Kira Florita (2001). Hank Williams: Snapshots from the Lost Highway. New York: Da Capo Press. ISBN 978-0306810527.
- Colin Escott; George Merritt; William MacEwen (2015). I Saw the Light: The Story of Hank Williams. Boston: Back Bay Books. ISBN 978-0316315050.
- Peter Guralnick; Colin Escott (2022). The Birth of Rock 'n' Roll: The Illustrated Story of Sun Records and the 70 Recordings That Changed the World. Stockholm: Weldon Owen. ISBN 978-1681888965.

=== Editor ===
- Colin Escott, ed. (1999). All Roots Lead to Rock: Legends of Early Rock 'n' Roll. New York: Schirmer Books. ISBN 978-0028648668.

=== Contributor ===
- Richard Kostelanetz, ed. (1997). The B.B. King Companion: Five Decades of Commentary. London: Music Sales Corporation. ISBN 978-0028646534.

== Other works ==
=== Theater ===
- Co-writer, Million Dollar Quartet (2010)
- Co-writer, Baby It's You! (2011)
- Writer, Million Dollar Quartet Christmas (2020)

=== Film ===
- Screenwriter, Let Freedom Sing: Music That Inspired the Civil Rights Movement (2009)
- Writer, Only New Orleans (2015)

=== Television ===
- Consultant, Lost Highway: The Story of Country Music (BBC, 2003)
- Executive producer, writer, Hank Williams: Honky Tonk Blues (PBS, American Masters, 2004)
- Producer, writer, Sun Records (CMT, 2017)
- Consultant, Country Music (PBS, 2019)

=== Articles and essays ===
Selected works from books and major music industry publications:

- "Memphis Blues: Sun Rise". Record Mirror. November 13, 1971
- "Carl Perkins: 'Blue Suede Shoes'". The History of Rock, 1981
- "Bill Justis: Raunchy by Choice". Goldmine. June 15, 1990
- "Bill Haley: Indisputably the First". Goldmine. April 19, 1991
- "Hi Records: That Memphis Beat". Record Hunter. July 1991
- "B.B. King: The Fortunate Son". Goldmine. April 29, 1994
- "Tim Hardin: Poet of the Interior". Goldmine. June 24, 1994
- "Ian and Sylvia: Northern Journey". Goldmine. July 8, 1994
- "The Big Bopper (J.P. Richardson)", "Floyd Cramer", "Johnny Horton", "Billy Walker". The Encyclopedia of Country Music. 1997
- "Come On, Let's Go!: Elvis on the Hayride". Mojo. December 2004
- "B. B. King: A Golden Anniversary". The B. B. King Reader. Hal Leonard Corporation. 2005. pp. 9–14.

=== Selected production credits ===
Producer credits on major LP and CD releases:

- Elvis Presley: The Definitive Collection (Sony BMG, 2006)
- The Ike & Tina Turner Story: 1960–1975 (Time/Life, 2007)
- Kenny Rogers: The Greatest Duets (Time/Life, 2009)
- Waylon Jennings: Goin' Down Rockin': The Last Recordings (Time/Life, 2012)
- George Jones: Heartaches and Hangovers (Time/Life, 2012)
- George Jones: The Great Lost Hits (Time/Life, 2012)
- Dim Lights, Thick Smoke and Hillbilly Music: Volumes 1-10 (Bear Family, 2011–2013)
- The Everly Brothers: Songs Our Daddy Taught Us (Bear Family, 2013 reissue)
- The Sun Rock Box, The Sun Blues Box, The Sun Country Box (Bear Family, 2013)
- Jerry Lee Lewis: The Knox Phillips Sessions (Ace, Time/Life, 2014)
- Truckers, Kickers, Cowboy Angels: The Blissed-Out Birth of Country Rock, Volumes 1-5 (Bear Family, 2014–2015)
- Big Joe Turner: The Complete Boss of the Blues (Bear Family, 2020)

=== Selected liner notes ===
- Tiny Tim: Tiptoe Through the Tulips: Resurrection (Bear Family, 1988)
- Elvis Presley: The Million Dollar Quartet (RCA, 1990)
- Harry Belafonte: My Greatest Songs (RCA, 1992)
- Gordon Lightfoot: Sunday Concert (Bear Family reissue, 1993)
- The Essential Skeeter Davis (RCA, 1996)
- The Classic Lena Horne (RCA, 2001)
- The Very Best of the Searchers (Sanctuary, 2002)
- Sammy Davis Jr.: My Greatest Songs (Universal, 2003)
- Al Green: Let's Stay Together (Hi Records, 2003 reissue)
- The Millennium Collection: The Best of Jimmy Cliff (Universal, 2004)
- This Is Reggae Music: The Golden Era 1960-1975 (Trojan Records, 2004)
- Bob Dylan: The Bootleg Series Volume 9: The Witmark Demos: 1962-1964 (Columbia Records, 2010)

== Awards ==
=== Grammy Awards ===
Year	Category	Nominated work	Result
1992	Best Album Notes	Hank Williams: The Original Singles Collection ... Plus	Nominated
1994	Best Album Notes	B.B. King: King of the Blues	Nominated
1999	Best Historical Album	The Complete Hank Williams	Won
1999	Best Album Notes	The Complete Hank Williams	Nominated
2011	Best Historical Album	Hank Williams: The Complete Mother's Best Recordings...Plus!	Nominated
2015	Best Historical Album	Hank Williams: The Garden Spot Programs, 1950	Won

=== Tony Awards ===
Year	Category	Nominated work	Result
2010	Best Musical	Million Dollar Quartet	Nominated
2010	Best Book of a Musical	Million Dollar Quartet	Nominated

=== Drama Desk Awards ===
Year	Category	Nominated work	Result
2010	Outstanding Revue	Million Dollar Quartet	Nominated

=== Living Blues Awards ===
Year	Category	Nominated work	Result
2003	Best Blues Album - Historical/Reissue	When the Sun Goes Down - The Secret History of Rock & Roll	Won
2003	Best Blues Album - Liner Notes	B.B. King: The Vintage Years	Won

=== International Bluegrass Music Association ===
Year	Category	Nominated work	Result
2007	Liner Notes of the Year	Ralph Stanley: A Mother's Prayer	Won

== Personal life ==
Escott was born in Boughton Aluph, Kent, England, on 31 August 1949, the son of Lenny, an optician, and Betty Escott. He graduated in 1971 from the University of Kent with a B.A. degree. He has lived in Nashville and Toronto.
