= Castle Recording Laboratory =

Music recording studio in Nashville, Tennessee

Coordinates: 36.1620°N 86.7838°W

- Industry: Recording studio
- Founded: Nashville, Tennessee, U.S. (1946)
- Founder: Carl Jenkins, George Reynolds, Aaron Shelton
- Defunct: 1956
- Fate: Closed
- Headquarters: Nashville, Tennessee, U.S.
- Number of locations: 1

Castle Recording Laboratory (also referred to as Castle Studio, or The Castle) was a recording studio established in Nashville, Tennessee, in 1946 by WSM broadcast engineers Carl Jenkins, George Reynolds and Aaron Shelton. The Castle was Nashville's first commercial recording studio, producing close to half of the songs on the country music charts between 1947 and 1955. Castle Studio was where Hank Williams recorded almost exclusively for his entire career, and Paul Cohen and Owen Bradley recorded artists like Ernest Tubb, Red Foley, Kitty Wells, and Webb Pierce before Bradley co-founded Bradley Studios.

== History ==
=== Early history ===
In 1946, recognizing demand for local recording studio services in Nashville, WSM broadcast engineers Carl Jenkins, George Reynolds and Aaron Shelton established Castle Recording Laboratory (named after the radio station's nickname "Air Castle of the South"). The engineers utilized an 8-input mono mixing console designed by Reynolds and WSM's facilities at the National Life and Accident Insurance Company Building at 7th Avenue North and Union Street after broadcast hours, with signals transferred via telephone line to a recording lathe at WSM's backup transmitter site 12 miles (19 km) away.

Less than a year later, Castle Recording recorded Francis Craig and His Orchestra's Ryman Auditorium performance of "Near You" for Bullet Records, which became the first number one song recorded in Nashville and the number one song of 1947.

=== Tulane Hotel ===
The subsequent demand for Castle Recording's services was too much for its owners to accommodate in WSM's studios after hours, and in 1947, with a $1,000 loan from Third National Bank to convert a banquet room on the second floor of the Hotel Tulane at 206 8th Avenue North into a recording studio equipped with their mixing console, an Ampex Model 200 tape recorder, and a Scully lathe, establishing the first commercial recording space in Nashville. Castle cut master discs for all major labels (except RCA), and independent labels like Bullet Records.

Between 1947 and 1955 the Castle Recording Laboratory produced close to half of the songs on the country music charts. Hank Williams recorded his first demos at Castle Recording on December 11, 1946, and went on to record almost exclusively at Castle while it was in operation.

Paul Cohen and Owen Bradley recorded artists like Ernest Tubb, Red Foley, and Webb Pierce at Castle Recording before Bradley went on to co-found Bradley Studios. In May, 1952, Kitty Wells recorded "It Wasn't God Who Made Honky Tonk Angels" at Castle Studio. The song became the first No. 1 Billboard country hit for a solo woman artist.

Castle Recording Laboratory shut down in 1956 in light of WSM enacting new policies designed to limit employees' outside business interests, as well as the planned demolition of the Tulane Hotel. The studio's founders continued their WSM careers.
