= Don Helms =

- Birth name: Donald Hugh Helms
- Born: February 28, 1927; New Brockton, Alabama
- Died: August 11, 2008 (aged 81); Nashville, Tennessee
- Genres: Country, honky-tonk
- Occupation: Musician
- Years active: 1942–2008
- Website: Don Helms official Myspace

Donald Hugh Helms (February 28, 1927 – August 11, 2008) was an American musician who was the steel guitar player of Hank Williams's Drifting Cowboys group. He was a member of the Steel Guitar Hall of Fame (1984).

== Biography ==
Helms was a featured musician on a vast number of Hank Williams recordings and provided the high, piercing signature steel guitar sound on more than 100 of Hank's songs and on 10 of his 11 number-one country hits.

Bill Lloyd, the curator of stringed instruments at the Country Music Hall of Fame and Museum, said of Helms: "After the great tunes and Hank's mournful voice, the next thing you think about in those songs is the steel guitar. It is the quintessential honky-tonk steel sound — tuneful, aggressive, full of attitude." Lloyd also credits Helms's sound as a major influence in shifting the sound of country music away from the hillbilly string-band sound popular in the 1930s and toward the more modern electric style that became prominent in the 1940s.

Helms played a double-neck 1948 Gibson Console Grande steel guitar, which lacked the foot pedals found on a more modern pedal steel guitar, which did not come into prominence in country music until after Hank Williams's death in 1953. He tuned the outside neck to A C# E G# B C# E G# (low to high), which he called E6, and the inside neck to F# A B D# F# A C# E, which he called B13. Almost all of Don's classic leads were done on the E6 neck. He used the B13 neck for fills.

After Williams's death, Helms went on to play on many classic country hits, including Patsy Cline's "Walkin' After Midnight", Stonewall Jackson's "Waterloo", the Louvin Brothers' "Cash on the Barrelhead", Lefty Frizzell's "Long Black Veil", and Loretta Lynn's "Blue Kentucky Girl."

Donald Hugh Helms was born in New Brockton, Alabama, and performed with many country music artists throughout the years, including playing steel guitar on Lefty Frizzell's recording of "Long Black Veil". In the late 1950s, Don played on several early Johnny Cash recordings on Columbia Records, The Fabulous Johnny Cash, Now, There Was a Song! and Hymns by Johnny Cash. During the mid-1960s, Helms played in the Wilburn Brothers backup band, the Nashville Tennesseans. He later played behind Hank Williams's daughter Jett Williams.

Helms also played for Hank Williams Jr. and wrote "The Ballad of Hank Williams", which he performed with Hank Jr. on The Pressure Is On LP released in 1981. In the song, Don jokingly refers to being fired by both Hank Sr. and Hank Jr. He also performed with Jett Williams, Hank Sr.'s daughter, and with David Church, a Hank Williams tribute artist.

His last four known sessions were (in order) with Mark David and the Nightly Lights on November 15, 2007, Joey Allcorn's album All Alone Again in early 2008, followed by sessions with Teresa Street, and then what is believed to be his final session, with Vince Gill recording unfinished Hank Williams Sr. tracks.

== Death ==
Helms died on August 11, 2008, in Nashville, Tennessee, from complications of heart surgery and diabetes.
