= Hank Williams on Stage =

Live album by Hank Williams
- Released: 1962
- Recorded: October 1949
- Studio: Castle Studio, Nashville
- Genre: Country, honky-tonk, blues
- Length: 32:25
- Label: MGM

Hank Williams chronology
The Spirit (1961)	Hank Williams on Stage (1962)	Greatest Hits 2 (1962)

Professional ratings
Review scores
Source	Rating
Allmusic -	3/5 stars

Hank Williams on Stage is the title of a posthumous live album of Hank Williams released by his record label, MGM in 1962 (see 1962 in country music). The performance is officially credited to Hank Williams and his Drifting Cowboys with Hank's first wife Audrey Williams, who sings back-up vocals. It was recorded as part of the "Health and Happiness Broadcasts" at the old Castle Studio at Eighth and Church Streets in Nashville in October 1949. Long-time WSM announcer Grant Turner hosted the event and wrote the album's liner notes. This release has long since been supplanted by the complete "Health and Happiness" recordings. Not noted by the original author is the fact that this contains studio recordings interspersed with the "live" recordings on both this and the follow-up album. The two albums do not contain every Health and Happiness Show.

The album art differs between the U.K. and U.S. releases.

== Track listing ==
=== Side One ===
1. "Rovin' Cowboy" - 0:50
2. "[Wedding Bells" (Claude Boone) - 3:25
3. "Lovesick Blues" (Irving Mills, Cliff Friend) - 2:53
4. "I'll Have a New Body" - 2:07
5. "Lost Highway" (Leon Payne) - 3:02
6. "Joe Clark" - 0:29
7. "Where the Soul of Man Never Dies" (Wayne Raney) - 1:31

=== Side Two ===
1. "Rovin' Cowboy" - 0:50
2. "I'm a Long Gone Daddy" (Hank Williams) - 2:28
3. "I'm Tellin' You" (Billy Hughes, Texas Jim Lewis) - 1:50
4. "Bill Cheatam" - 1:00
5. "When God Comes and Gathers His Jewels (Williams) - 2:54
6. "The Blues Come Around" (Williams) - 2:46
7. "I Wanna Live and Love Always" - 2:06

== Personnel ==
- Hillous Butrum - bass
- Don Helms - steel guitar
- Bob McNett - guitar
- Jerry Rivers - fiddle
- Hank Williams - vocals, guitar

== Sources ==
- Liner Notes: (1962) Hank Williams - Hank Williams on Stage(LP). MGM 3999
