= I Don't Care (If Tomorrow Never Comes) =

Single by Hank Williams
- A-side: "My Love for You (Has Turned to Hate)"
- Published: November 30, 1948 Acuff-Rose Publications
- Released: April 1947
- Recorded: February 13, 1947
- Genre: Country
- Length: 2:46
- Label: Sterling
- Songwriter: Hank Williams
- Producer: Fred Rose

Hank Williams singles chronology
"Wealth Won't Save Your Soul" (1947)	"I Don't Care (If Tomorrow Never Comes)" (1947)	"Pan American" (1947)

"I Don't Care (If Tomorrow Never Comes)" is a song written and originally recorded by Hank Williams. It was the B-side of the single release, "My Love for You (Has Turned to Hate)", on Sterling Records.

== Background ==
"I Don't Care (If Tomorrow Never Comes)" was one of four Hank Williams songs recorded by singer Molly O'Day in 1946 and 1947 that appeared in Williams' self-published song folios in 1945 and 1946. The song, a lament about a lost love, was recorded at Williams' second and final Sterling recording session on February 13, 1947 with Tommy Jackson (fiddle), Dale "Smokey" Lohman (steel guitar), Zeke Turner (electric guitar), and Louis Innis (bass). As Colin Escott observes, Hank and producer Fred Rose were beginning to hone the sound that would make Hank a country superstar:

"The second Sterling session saw the birth of one of Hank's trademarks, the "crack" rhythm: an electric guitar keeping time on the deadened bass strings. Without drums in his lineup, Hank used the electric guitar to emphasize the pulse. It was the sound that Johnny Cash later made into a trademark, adding a little rhythmic flourish to make 'boom-chicka-boom.'"

Bonnie Owens recorded the song in 1969. In 1981, Hank Williams, Jr. released the song as a duet with George Jones on his album The Pressure Is On.
