= Weary Blues from Waitin' =

1951 song by Hank Williams

Single by Hank Williams With His Drifting Cowboys
- B-side: "I Can't Escape from You"
- Published: November 28, 1951 Acuff-Rose Publications, Inc.
- Released: September 1953
- Recorded: 1951 demo + July 8, 1953 overdub
- Genre: Country, blues
- Length: 2:30
- Label: MGM 11574
- Songwriter: Hank Williams

Hank Williams With His Drifting Cowboys singles chronology
"I Won't Be Home No More" (1953)	"Weary Blues from Waitin'" (1953)	"Calling You" (1953)

"Weary Blues from Waitin'" is a song written by Hank Williams. It was released as a posthumous single on MGM Records in 1953.

== Background ==
Although Williams had been found dead in his chauffeur-driven Cadillac on his way to a show in Canton, Ohio on New Year's Day, 1953, he was still arguably MGM's hottest act by summer; two albums were in stores by March, Memorial Album and Hank Williams as Luke the Drifter, and within ten weeks of his death he had as many albums on the market as he did when he lived, with hundreds more to follow. As biographer Colin Escott observes, "Hank's entire catalog began moving in unprecedented quantities...The oil well that Hank Williams became in death started to gush." Like Elvis Presley over two decades later, Williams became even larger in death than he had been in life, and MGM capitalized on his growing legend by exploiting the LP market and issuing its remaining Williams recordings as singles.

"Weary Blues from Waiting" had likely been recorded as a demo some time in 1951. The Drifting Cowboys, most of them now working for Ray Price, were brought back to augment the recording with overdubs. While MGM would insensitively overdub strings and other accoutrements to Williams masters as the years wore on, the results on "Weary Blues from Waitin'" were utterly convincing, and the single rose to number 7 on the country singles chart. A major part of the song's success was Williams' typically heart-rending vocal and the high quality of the composition, which contains what is cited as one of his most haunting lines:

Through tears I watch young lovers
As they go strolling by
For all the things that might have been
God forgive me if I cry.

Although the song is copyrighted to Williams alone, it is likely that Ray Price had a hand in writing it, during a car ride from Williams's Opry performance, to a show in Evansville, Indiana in September 1951 (Price also recorded the song a month later). The song was eventually released in its original, undubbed form.

== Cover versions ==
- Ronnie Hawkins recorded a version for Roulette in 1960.
- Bob Dylan and Joan Baez recorded in 1965, released in The Bootleg Series Vol.12 Collector's Edition
- Del Shannon covered the song in 1964.
- Spike Jones recorded the song in 1964.
- Wanda Jackson released a version in 1964.
- Duane Eddy recorded an instrumental version for RCA.
- Buddy Greco recorded it for Epic in 1965.
- Hank Williams, Jr. cut the song for MGM in 1966.
- Steve Goodman recorded the song for his 1977 album Say It in Private.
- Vince Martin & Fred Neil recorded a version for their only album Tear Down the Walls.
- The The covered the song in 1995 album Hanky Panky
- Madeleine Peyroux recorded a version for her 2004 album Careless Love
- Vince Gill and Paul Franklin recorded a version for their 2023 album, Sweet Memories
