= Moanin' the Blues (album) =

1952 album by Hank Williams

Studio album by Hank Williams
- Released: September 12, 1952
- Recorded: 1947–1951
- Genres: Country; honky-tonk
- Label: MGM
- Producer: Fred Rose

Hank Williams chronology
Hank Williams Sings (1951)	Moanin' the Blues (1952)	Memorial Album (1953)

Moanin' the Blues is the second and last studio album by American country musician Hank Williams, released on MGM Records in 1952.

== Recording and composition ==
Like Williams' debut LP Hank Williams Sings, Moanin' the Blues contained no new music at the time of its release. Unlike his debut, which was composed mostly of B-sides that had fared poorly upon release, his second album is packed with hits, including three #1 smashes: "Lovesick Blues," "Long Gone Lonesome Blues," and "Honky Tonk Blues." "Moanin' the Blues" and "I'm a Long Gone Daddy" were also Top 10 hits, peaking at #2 and #6 respectively. Although it did not chart when it was released, "I'm So Lonesome I Could Cry," which many believe to be Williams' songwriting masterpiece, is also featured on the LP. The tracks were recorded between 1947 and 1951, with the most recent cut being "Honky Tonk Blues." With the exception of "Lovesick Blues," Williams composed all the songs. The recordings were produced by Fred Rose, who also compiled the album around a blues theme. Williams' most blues-influenced cuts, "My Bucket's Got a Hole in It" and the nascent rock and roller "Move It on Over," are omitted. It was unlikely that the album was a major priority for MGM; it was axiomatic that country LPs didn't sell, and the notion of a single as a trailer for the hugely more profitable album was still more than ten years away.

== Track listing ==
All songs written by Hank Williams unless otherwise indicated:

1. "Lovesick Blues" (Cliff Friend, Irving Mills)
2. "Moanin' the Blues"
3. "The Blues Come Around"
4. "I'm So Lonesome I Could Cry"
5. "I'm a Long Gone Daddy"
6. "My Sweet Love Ain't Around"
7. "Long Gone Lonesome Blues"
8. "Honky Tonk Blues"

== Personnel ==
- Hank Williams - guitar, vocal
- Tommy Jackson - fiddle
- Jerry Rivers - fiddle
- Robert "Chubby" Wise - fiddle
- Farris Coursey - drums (on "Moanin' the Blues")
- Don Helms - steel guitar
- Jerry Byrd - steel guitar
- Bob McNett - electric guitar
- Zeke Turner - electric guitar
- Sam Pruett - electric guitar
- Jack Shook - rhythm guitar
- Louis Innis - rhythm guitar, bass guitar
- Howard Watts - bass guitar
- Willie Thawl - bass guitar
- Fred Rose - piano (unconfirmed)
- Owen Bradley - piano (unconfirmed)
