= Hank Williams Sings =

1951 album by Hank Williams

Studio album by Hank Williams
- Released: November 9, 1951
- Recorded: 1946–1949
- Genre: Country; blues; gospel
- Length: 22:05
- Label: MGM
- Producer: Fred Rose

Hank Williams chronology
Hank Williams Sings (1951)	Moanin' the Blues (1952)

Hank Williams Sings is the debut album by American country music singer-songwriter Hank Williams. It was released by MGM Records on November 9, 1951.

== Background ==
By 1951, Hank Williams' popularity had soared. Following the chart topping records "Cold, Cold Heart" and "Hey Good Lookin'", he joined the Hadacol caravan, a train-transported road show that toured the South in a forty-nine dates one night show schedule. After the tour disbanded before the shows were completed, Williams returned to Nashville, Tennessee. In September 1951, he traveled to Hollywood after being offered a part as the Sheriff in Small Town Girl. Ultimately, Williams did not participate in the movie. On November 14, Williams was invited to The Perry Como Chesterfield Show. Anticipating the show, and the possible record sales that it could propel, MGM Records released Hank Williams Sings.

== Recording and composition ==
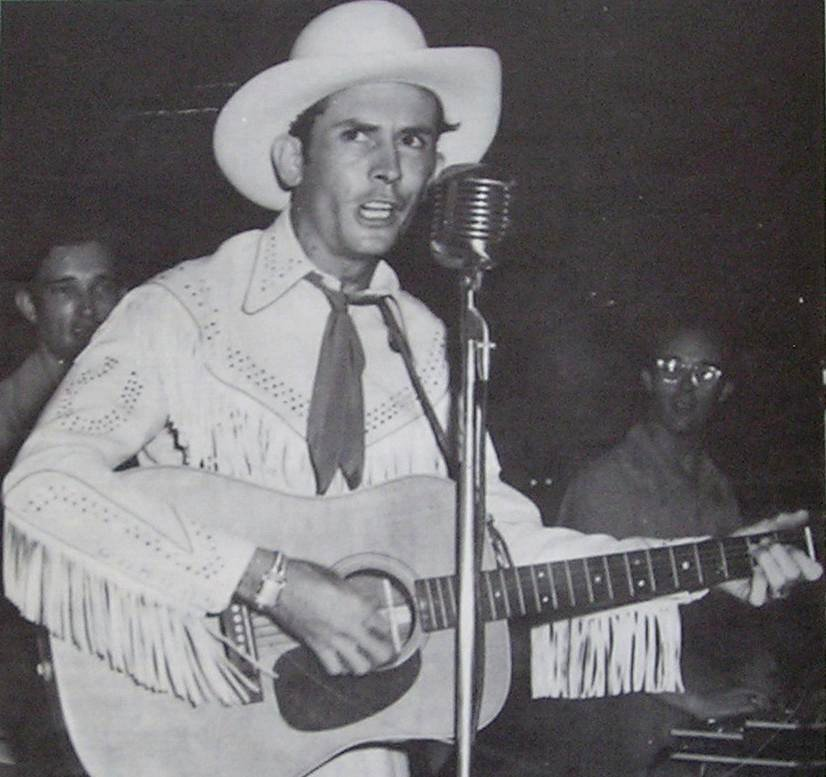
Hank Williams in concert in 1951

The songs were recorded by Williams during sessions between 1946 and 1949. Producer Fred Rose took songs from previous single releases that did not sell well at the moment of their release. As Williams biographer Colin Escott put it: "Rose used Hank's first album as a dump site for oddball tracks that hadn't sold elsewhere. With the exception of "Wedding Bells", the tracks were the dogs of Hank's catalog, like "I've Just Told Mama Goodbye", "Wealth Won't Save Your Soul", and "Six More Miles".

Billboard theorized that the label had decided not to release an album with new sides because it "would only spread jockey and juke plays too thinly instead of getting the concentrated push on a single record". The LP contains two indisputable Hank Williams classics: the album opener "Lost Highway," which was composed by blind Texas honky tonk singer and songwriter Leon Payne, and the gospel standard "I Saw the Light," which Williams usually sang to close his shows. Five of the album's eight tracks were composed by Williams, with the only legitimate hit being "Wedding Bells," which hit #2 in 1949. "A Mansion on the Hill" failed to make the Top 10 in late 1948, peaking at #12. None of the remaining songs (mostly B-sides) charted at all. "Wealth Won't Save Your Soul" had actually been recorded for Sterling Records and released as Hank's second single before he moved to MGM in April 1947.

The album was released in three formats: ten-inch LP, a four 45 rpm packaged set and a four 78 rpm set. It failed to chart, partly because singles, rather than LPs, were emphasized in the country music business due in large part to the valuable jukebox trade.

== Track listing ==
Side one
No.	Title	Writer(s)	Recording date	Length
1.	"Lost Highway"	Leon Payne	March 1, 1949	2:40
2.	"I've Just Told Mama Goodbye"	Slim Sweet, Curley Kinsey	March 20, 1949	2:53
3.	"I Saw the Light"	Hank Williams	April 21, 1947	2:43
4.	"Six More Miles (To the Graveyard)"	Hank Williams	April 21, 1947	2:46

Side two
No.	Title	Writer(s)	Recording date	Length
1.	"A Mansion on the Hill"	Hank Williams	November 7, 1947	2:33
2.	"Wealth Won't Save Your Soul"	Hank Williams	December 11, 1946	2:45
3.	"Wedding Bells"	Claude Boone	March 20, 1949	2:53
4.	"A House Without Love"	Hank Williams	August 30, 1949	2:52

== Personnel ==
- Hank Williams -vocals, guitar
- Zeb Turner - lead guitar
- Zeke Turner - lead guitar
- Louis Innis - bass, rhythm guitar
- Jack Shook - rhythm guitar
- James "Guy" Willis - guitar
- Tommy Jackson - fiddle
- Dale Potter - fiddle
- Charles "Skeeter" Willis - fiddle
- Chubby Wise - fiddle
- Jerry Byrd - steel guitar
- Don Davis - steel guitar
- Dale "Smokey" Lohman - steel guitar
- Ernie Newton - bass
- Bronson "Brownie" Reynolds - bass
- Velma Williams Smith - bass
- Charles "Indian" Wright - bass
