= When God Comes and Gathers His Jewels =

Single by Hank Williams
- A-side: "Wealth Won't Save Your Soul"
- Published: November 30, 1948 Acuff-Rose Publications
- Released: February 1947
- Recorded: December 11, 1946, WSM Studio
- Genre: Country
- Length: 2:45
- Label: Sterling
- Songwriter: Hank Williams
- Producer: Fred Rose

Hank Williams singles chronology
"Never Again (Will I Knock on Your Door)" (1947)	"When God Comes and Gathers His Jewels" (1947)	"My Love for You (Has Turned to Hate)" (1947)

"When God Comes and Gathers His Jewels" is a hymn written by Hank Williams. It was the B-side to his second single, "Wealth Won't Save Your Soul," released in 1947 on Sterling Records. Williams wrote and performed spiritual music throughout his career on his radio shows and in concert, usually closing personal appearances with his famous gospel number "I Saw the Light." He recorded this song on December 11, 1946, at WSM Studios in Nashville with Fred Rose producing and was backed on the session by the Willis Brothers, who also went by the name of the Oklahoma Wranglers: James "Guy" Willis (guitar), Vic Wallis (accordion), Charles "Skeeter" Willis (fiddle), and Charles "Indian" Wright (bass).
