= Pan American (song) =

Single by Hank Williams
- A-side: "Honky Tonkin'"
- Published: March 19, 1948 Acuff-Rose Publications
- Released: May 1947
- Recorded: February 13, 1947
- Genre: Hillbilly
- Length: 2:48
- Label: Sterling 210
- Songwriter: Hank Williams
- Producer: Fred Rose

Hank Williams singles chronology
"My Love for You (Has Turned to Hate)" (1947)	"Pan American" (1947)	"Move It on Over" (1947)

"Pan American" is a song written and recorded by Hank Williams. It was his final single on Sterling Records after moving to MGM in April 1947.

== Background ==
"Pan American" was Williams' attempt to rewrite Roy Acuff's immensely popular version of the Carter Family's "Wabash Cannonball." Along with the church, Acuff was arguably Williams' biggest musical influence; in 1952 he insisted to Ralph Gleason, "He's the biggest singer this music ever knew. You booked him and you didn't worry about crowds. For drawing power in the South, it was Roy Acuff, then God."

"Pan American" was about the Pan-American, a train that ran daily on the Louisville and Nashville Railroad from Cincinnati to New Orleans via Montgomery, highballing it through Greenville and other small towns that Hank knew well. The song was recorded in Nashville with Fred Rose producing. Williams was backed by Tommy Jackson (fiddle), Dale "Smokey" Lohman (steel guitar), Zeke Turner (electric guitar), and Louis Innis (bass). The single did not chart.

== Bibliography ==
- Escott, Colin (2004). Hank Williams: The Biography. Back Bay. ISBN 0-316-73497-7.
