= I'll Be a Bachelor 'Til I Die =

1948 single by Hank Williams

Single by Hank Williams
- A-side: "Honky Tonkin'"
- Published: November 16, 1948, Acuff-Rose Publications
- Released: April 1948
- Recorded: November 7, 1947
- Studio: Castle Studio, Nashville
- Genre: Hillbilly, honky-tonk, country blues
- Length: 2:36
- Label: MGM
- Songwriter: Hank Williams
- Producer: Fred Rose

Hank Williams singles chronology
| "My Sweet Love Ain't Around" (1948) | "I'll Be a Bachelor 'Til I Die" (1948) | "I'm a Long Gone Daddy" (1948) |

"I'll Be a Bachelor 'Til I Die" is a song written and recorded by Hank Williams on MGM Records.

== Background ==
The bravado-driven "I'll Be a Bachelor 'Til I Die" scorns the institution of marriage with Williams singing, "I can't understand how one and one make one." Williams appears to have had no such doubts himself; in the American Masters episode about his life, Audrey Williams recalls that Williams proposed to her almost immediately after they met. On October 18, 1952, Williams and Billie Jean Jones Eshlimar were married in Minden, Louisiana by a justice of the peace. It was the second marriage for both. The next day two public ceremonies were also held at the New Orleans Civic Auditorium, where 14,000 seats were sold for each. After Williams' death, a judge ruled that the wedding was not legal because Jones Eshlimar's divorce had not become final until eleven days after she married Williams. Audrey and Hank's mother Lillie Williams were the driving force behind having the marriage declared invalid and pursued the matter for years. Williams also married Audrey before her divorce was final, on the tenth day of a required sixty-day reconciliation period.

"I'll Be a Bachelor 'Til I Die" was recorded at Castle Studio in Nashville with Fred Rose producing and backing from Jerry Byrd (steel guitar), Robert "Chubby" Wise (fiddle), Zeke Turner (lead guitar), probably Louis Innis (bass) and either Owen Bradley or Rose on piano. It was released as the B-side to "Honky Tonkin'".

== Bibliography ==
- Ellison, Curtis W. (1995). Country Music Culture: From Hard Times to Heaven. University Press of Mississippi. ISBN 0-87805-721-8.
- Escott, Colin (2004). Hank Williams: The Biography. Back Bay. ISBN 0-316-73497-7.
- Koon, George William (1983). Hank Williams, so lonesome. University of Mississippi press. ISBN 978-1-57806-283-6.
- Williams, Roger M (1981). Sing A Sad Song. University of Illinois Press. ISBN 978-0-252-00861-0.
