= I Can't Escape from You (Hank Williams song) =

1951 song by Hank Williams

Single by Hank Williams With His Drifting Cowboys
- A-side: "Weary Blues from Waitin'"
- Published: November 21, 1951 Acuff-Rose Publications, Inc.
- Released: September 1953
- Recorded: 1951 demo + July 8, 1953 overdub
- Genre: Country
- Length: 2:18
- Label: MGM 11574
- Songwriter: Hank Williams

"I Can't Escape from You" is a song written by Hank Williams. The song was originally recorded as a demo by Williams probably in 1951 but he never recorded it in a studio with a band. MGM released an overdubbed version in 1953 with backing from the Drifting Cowboys.

The song contains the bitter testimony of a man haunted by the memory of a woman who has "a heart of stone." Like many of the demos that feature just Williams and his guitar, the original performance is artlessly affecting and displays his spare, haunting lyrics:

A jug of wine to numb my mind
But what good does it do?
The jug runs dry and still I cry
I can't escape from you

These wasted tears are souvenirs
Of a love I thought was true
Your memory is chained to me
I can't escape from you

== Cover versions ==
- Ray Price recorded the song for Columbia on July 8, 1952
- Jack Scott cut a version of the song.
- George Jones recorded a version of the song.
- The The also recorded it for their Williams tribute LP Hanky Panky.
