= My Son Calls Another Man Daddy =

Single by Hank Williams With His Drifting Cowboys
- A-side: "Long Gone Lonesome Blues"
- Published: November 25, 1949 Acuff-Rose Publications
- Released: March 1950
- Recorded: January 9, 1950
- Studio: Castle Studio, Nashville
- Genre: Hillbilly, Honky-tonk, Country blues
- Length: 2:33
- Label: MGM
- Songwriter(s): Jewell House, Hank Williams
- Producer(s): Fred Rose

Hank Williams With His Drifting Cowboys singles chronology
"I Just Don't Like This Kind of Living" (1950)	"My Son Calls Another Man Daddy" (1950)	"Why Don't You Love Me" (1950)

"My Son Calls Another Man Daddy" is a song written by Jewell House and made famous by country star Hank Williams, who released the song in 1950.

== Background ==
"My Son Calls Another Man Daddy", which was issued as the B-side of the #1 single "Long Gone Lonesome Blues", was written by Jewell House, who hosted the Hayloft Jamboree and ran Jewell's Record Shop and Fun House in Texarkana. Like "Wedding Bells" and "I've Just Told Mama Goodbye", the song was filled with the kind of sentimentality that had made Roy Acuff, one of Hank's biggest musical influences, so popular in the South. The song expresses the thoughts of a jailed man who loses his son, a traditional theme in country music. Williams attempted to record the song on March 2, 1949 in Nashville, but that version was deemed unsatisfactory. He cut the song again on January 9, 1950 with backing from Jerry Rivers (fiddle), Don Helms (steel guitar), Bob McNett (lead guitar), Jack Shook (rhythm guitar), and Ernie Newton (bass) at Castle Studio in Nashville with Fred Rose producing. It climbed to #9 on the country singles chart.

== Cover versions ==
Charlie Pride covered the song on his 1980 album There's a Little Bit of Hank in Me. David Allan Coe cut the song for his 1997 LP The Ghost of Hank Williams. Willie Nelson also recorded a version of the song.

== Bibliography ==
- Escott, Colin (2004). Hank Williams: The Biography. Back Bay. ISBN 0-316-73497-7.
- MacEwen, William; Merritt, George; Escott, Colin (2015-11-10). I Saw the Light: The Story of Hank Williams. Little, Brown. ISBN 978-0-316-31506-7.
