= Calling You (Hank Williams song) =

Single by Hank Williams
- A-side: "Never Again (Will I Knock on Your Door)"
- Published: November 30, 1948 Acuff-Rose Publications
- Released: January 1947
- Recorded: December 11, 1946, Nashville
- Genre: Country
- Length: 2:52
- Label: Sterling
- Songwriter: Hank Williams
- Producer: Fred Rose

Hank Williams singles chronology
"Calling You" (1947)	"Wealth Won't Save Your Soul" (1947)

"Calling You" is a hymn written and recorded by Hank Williams.

== Background ==
With its simple musical structure and infectious sing-a-long chorus, "Calling You" remains one of Williams' most affecting gospel compositions. It was recorded at the singer's first ever recording session on December 11, 1946 for Sterling Records with Fred Rose producing. Williams was backed on the session by the Willis Brothers, who also went by the name of the Oklahoma Wranglers: James "Guy" Willis (guitar), Vic Willis (accordion), Charles "Skeeter" Willis (fiddle), and Charles "Indian" Wright (bass). In the 2004 book Hank Williams: The Biography, Vic Willis recalls to Colin Escott, "Hank was a quiet guy and kinda negative. But he had a hell of a dry sense of humor. Someone asked Hank if he wanted a beer with his meal, and he shook his head. 'You don't know ol' Hank. Hank just don't have one beer.'" The uneasy dichotomy between Williams' faith and his often reckless lifestyle would only make him a more compelling figure in years to come, especially in light of the passion he unfailingly displayed when singing spiritual music.

A demo version of "Calling You," likely recorded between July 1946 and the fall of 1948 for Acuff-Rose, is also available, as well as a version featuring Hank's wife Audrey Williams.

== Bibliography ==
- Escott, Colin (2004). Hank Williams: The Biography. Back Bay. ISBN 0-316-73497-7.
