= I Won't Be Home No More =

1952 single by Hank Williams

Single by Hank Williams With His Drifting Cowboys
- B-side: "My Love for You (Has Turned to Hate)"
- Published: September 15, 1952 Acuff-Rose Publications, Inc.
- Released: July 1953
- Recorded: July 11, 1952
- Studio: Castle Studio, Nashville
- Genre: country and western, honky-tonk, country blues
- Length: 2:44
- Label: MGM
- Songwriter: Hank Williams
- Producer: Fred Rose

Hank Williams With His Drifting Cowboys singles chronology
"Take These Chains From My Heart" (1953)	"I Won't Be Home No More" (1953)	"Weary Blues from Waitin'" (1953)

"I Won't Be Home No More" is a song recorded by Hank Williams on July 11, 1952. It was released posthumously on MGM Records a year later. The song climbed to number four on the US Billboard National Best Sellers chart.

== Background ==
It was recorded at the same session that produced "You Win Again" and has a similar theme, albeit in a more blithesome tone, that probably reflects Hank's bitterness towards his ex-wife Audrey Williams (Hank and Audrey were legally divorced the day before the session). As Colin Escott notes, "Even though it's suppose [sic] to be a lighthearted song, Hank seems vindictive, even spiteful." It was recorded at Castle Studio in Nashville with Jerry Rivers (fiddle), Don Helms (steel guitar), and Harold Bradley (rhythm guitar), while Chet Atkins supposedly played lead guitar and Ernie Newton played bass.
