= My Love for You =

My Love for You may refer to:

- My Love for You (Sevyn Streeter song), a 2016 single by Sevyn Streeter
- My Love for You (Johnny Mathis song), a 1960 single by Johnny Mathis

== See also ==
- My Love for You (Has Turned to Hate), a 1947 single by Hank Williams
