= Honky Tonkin' =

1947 single by Hank Williams

Single by Hank Williams And His Drifting Cowboys
- B-side: "Pan American"
- Published: November 16, 1948 Acuff-Rose Publications, 2002 SONY/ATV Acuff-Rose Music
- Released: May 1947
- Recorded: February 13, 1947
- Studio: WSM Radio Station Studio, Nashville
- Genre: Hillbilly, Honky-tonk, Country blues
- Length: 2:45
- Label: Sterling 210
- Songwriter: Hiram Williams
- Producer: Fred Rose

"Honky Tonkin'"

Single by Hank Williams With His Drifting Cowboys
- B-side: "I'll Be a Bachelor 'Til I Die"
- Released: April 1948
- Recorded: November 6, 1947
- Studio: Castle Studio, Nashville
- Genre: Hillbilly, Honky-tonk, Country blues
- Length: 2:42
- Label: MGM 10171
- Songwriter: Hiram Williams
- Producer: Fred Rose

Hank Williams With His Drifting Cowboys singles chronology
"My Sweet Love Ain't Around" (1948)	"Honky Tonkin'" (1948)	"I'm a Long Gone Daddy" (1948)

"Honky Tonkin'" is a 1947 country music song, written and recorded by Hank Williams. His song went to #14 on the Billboard country music chart in 1948. In 1982, it became the sixth chart topping single for Williams' son, Hank Williams Jr.

== First version ==
Hank Williams released two versions of "Honky Tonkin'." The first was cut at his second and final recording session for Sterling Records on February 13, 1947, and features backing by Tommy Jackson (fiddle), Dale "Smokey" Lohman (steel guitar), Zeke Turner (electric guitar) and Louis Innis (bass). The song, which appeared as "Honkey-Tonkey" in Williams' first song folio, was chosen by producer Fred Rose as the B-side to "Pan American" after Hank had achieved success with two singles of mostly spiritual material on Sterling. While the subject matter is straight barroom fare in the Ernest Tubb tradition, the song is musically unusual, with the chorus made up of three ten-beat phrases, plus two measures of four beats, for a highly unusual thirty-eight beat section; up till the last two turnaround measures of the chorus, this section could be written in 10/4 time. Many later versions "straighten out" the chorus to make it fit a more familiar four-beat pattern. The entire song is played over one chord, except for the last two beats of the third 10/4 phrase of the chorus, which briefly touches on the dominant. According to Colin Escott's 2004 biography on the singer, the original draft featured the lines, "We are going to the city, to the city fair/We'll get a quart of whiskey and get up in the air," which the commercially minded Rose had Hank change to ""We're going to the city, to the city fair/If you go to the city, baby, you will find me there." In 2015, this recording on Sterling Records was inducted into the Grammy Hall of Fame.

== Second version ==
Surprised by the success of the unknown Williams, and equally impressed with the raw talent of the young songwriter, Rose got him a contract with MGM that was finalized on April 1, 1947. On November 6, 1947, Williams recut "Honky Tonkin'" at Castle Studio in Nashville with backing from Robert "Chubby" Wise (fiddle), Jerry Byrd (steel guitar), Zeke Turner (lead guitar), and probably Louis Innis on bass and either Owen Bradley or Rose on piano. The second recording of the song is more vibrant than the first, likely owing to the better recording facilities and the chemistry that had developed between Williams and Rose. To avoid confusion, Rose bought all the Sterling singles of "Honky Tonkin'" on May 17, 1947, for two thousand dollars and then sold them to MGM. Williams had enjoyed his first Top 5 hit with "Move It on Over" but "Honky Tonkin'" did not fare as well, failing to make the Top 10. Billboard praised the single's "deft ork beat."

== Cover versions ==
- Townes Van Zandt covered the song as well on his 1972 album The Late Great Townes Van Zandt.
- The song was covered by the Nitty Gritty Dirt Band on their 1972 album Will the Circle Be Unbroken
- A previously unissued version by Hank Williams, Jr. recorded in 1973 appears on the 1992 box set Living Proof: The MGM Recordings 1963–1975. Hank Jr. released another version on his 1982 LP High Notes, hitting #1 on the Billboard country music charts and staying there for a week. It spent a total of twelve weeks on the country chart.
- Actress Sissy Spacek recorded the song on her 1983 album Hangin' Up My Heart
- The The covered this song on their album Hanky Panky, which all consists of covers of Hank Williams' songs.
- Outlaw country singer Waylon Jennings recorded the song for his 1992 album Ol' Waylon Sings Ol' Hank.
- Charley Crockett covered the song on his album, Lil G.L.'s Honky Tonk Jubilee (2017).
- Joe Ely covered the song on his 1978 album Honky Tonk Masquerade
- Gary Stewart, who was dubbed "The King of the Honky Tonks" by the NY Times, covered "Honky Tonkin'" on his 1975 album "Out of Hand"

== Charts ==
=== Hank Williams Jr. ===
==== Weekly charts ====
Chart (1982)	Peak position
US Hot Country Songs (Billboard)	1
Canadian RPM Country Tracks	6

==== Year-end charts ====
Chart (1982)	Position
US Hot Country Songs (Billboard)	40

== Sources ==
- Escott, Colin; Merritt, George; MacEwen, William (2004). Hank Williams: The Biography. New York: Little, Brown.
