= Joseph Pennington =

Joseph Pennington may refer to:

- Joseph Pennington (diplomat), American diplomat
- Sir Joseph Pennington, 2nd Baronet, British landowner and politician
- Joe Pennington, American musician
