= William Herbert York =

American double-bassist (1918–2004)

William Herbert "Lum" York (November 16, 1918 – August 15, 2004) was a country musician best known as the bass player in the Hank Williams backing band The Drifting Cowboys.

== Biography ==
York was a native of Elmore, Alabama.

From 1944 until 1949, he was a member of Hank Williams's backing band The Drifting Cowboys as its double bass player. He began playing with Lefty Frizzell's band in 1952 and later played with musicians including Marty Robbins and George Morgan (singer).

During the 1960s and 1970s, he played at the Old South Jamboree. In 1986, he played at the Smithsonian Folklife Festival. After a heart attack forced him to stop playing the double bass, York began playing the spoons from 1998 onwards, playing alongside Hank Williams Jr., Hank Williams III and Jett Williams.

York died of heart disease on August 15, 2004, in Baton Rouge.
