= My Love for You (Has Turned to Hate) =

Single by Hank Williams
- B-side: "I Don't Care (If Tomorrow Never Comes)"
- Published: November 30, 1948 Acuff-Rose Publications
- Released: April 1947
- Recorded: February 13, 1947
- Genre: Country
- Length: 2:40
- Label: Sterling
- Songwriter: Hank Williams
- Producer: Fred Rose

Hank Williams singles chronology
"Wealth Won't Save Your Soul" (1947)	"My Love for You (Has Turned to Hate)" (1947)	"Pan American" (1947)

"My Love for You (Has Turned to Hate)" is a song written and recorded by Hank Williams. It was his third single released on Sterling Records in April 1947. After issuing two singles containing mostly spiritual music, "My Love for You (Has Turned to Hate)" was the kind of bitter love song that Williams would become famous for, its narrator turning away a remorseful lover who wishes to come back. It was recorded on February 13, 1947 in Nashville with Fred Rose producing and featured Tommy Jackson (fiddle), Dale "Smokey" Lohman (steel guitar), Zeke Turner (electric guitar), and Louis Innis (bass). Like his previous two releases on Sterling, the single did not chart, but they did well enough for Hank to eventually land a contract with MGM Records in April 1947.
