= I've Just Told Mama Goodbye =

1949 song performed by Hank Williams

Single by Hank Williams With His Drifting Cowboys
- A-side: "Wedding Bells"
- Published: April 21, 1949 Acuff-Rose Publications, Inc.
- Released: May 1, 1949
- Recorded: March 20, 1949
- Studio: Castle Studio, Nashville
- Genre: Country, blues
- Length: 2:55
- Label: MGM
- Songwriters: Curly Kinsey, Slim Sweet

Hank Williams With His Drifting Cowboys singles chronology
"Lovesick Blues" (1949)	"I've Just Told Mama Goodbye" (1949)	"Mind Your Own Business" (1949)

"I've Just Told Mama Goodbye" is a song by Hank Williams on MGM Records.

== Background ==
"I've Just Told Mama Goodbye" was first released in 1949 on Mercury Records by Slim Sweet, who wrote the song with Curly Kinsey, and it was chosen along with "Wedding Bells" to be Hank Williams' follow-up single to the immensely successful #1 hit "Lovesick Blues." The pairing of these two songs resulted in what may have been the most sentimental single Williams ever released, and while his own compositions were rarely saccharine, he exhibited a weakness for other songs that were. Significantly, the release was timed to coincide with Mother's Day, and as Williams biographer Colin Escott put it, dying mothers "were to hillbilly music what fair maidens walking through the dingly dell were to English folk song." Williams rendition has an unmistakable Roy Acuff influence. Williams recorded it at Castle Studio in Nashville on March 20, 1949 with Fred Rose producing and was supported by Dale Potter (fiddle), Don Davis (steel guitar), Zeb Turner (electric guitar), Jack Shook (rhythm guitar), and Velma Williams (bass).
