= The Blues Come Around =

Single by Hank Williams With His Drifting Cowboys
- A-side: "I'm a Long Gone Daddy"
- Released: June 1948
- Recorded: November 7, 1947
- Studio: Castle Studio, Nashville
- Genre: Country; honky-tonk; blues; rockabilly
- Length: 2:36
- Label: MGM
- Songwriter(s): Hank Williams
- Producer(s): Fred Rose

Hank Williams With His Drifting Cowboys singles chronology
| "Honky Tonkin'" (1948) | "The Blues Come Around" (1948) | "I Saw the Light" (1948) |

"The Blues Come Around" is a song written and recorded by Hank Williams for MGM Records. It was released as the B-side to the single "I'm a Long Gone Daddy" in June 1948. It was recorded at Castle Studio in Nashville with Fred Rose producing and backing from Jerry Byrd (steel guitar), Robert "Chubby" Wise (fiddle), Zeke Turner (lead guitar), probably Louis Innis (bass) and either Owen Bradley or Rose on piano. Waylon Jennings recorded the song for his 1992 album Ol' Waylon Sings Ol' Hank.

== Bibliography ==
- Escott, Colin; Merritt, George; MacEwen, William (2004). Hank Williams: The Biography. New York: Little, Brown.
