= Joe Pennington =

American country musician (1928–2020)

Joseph Lephmon Pennington (January 15, 1928 – July 1, 2020), also known as Joe Penny, was an American country music singer and musician born in Plant City, Florida.

Joe Pennington was the guitarist for Dub Adams and the K-Bar Ranch Hands from late 1945 until early 1947, playing dance halls across West Texas. He was the former lead guitarist for Hank Williams' backing band, the Drifting Cowboys. After leaving the Drifting Cowboys in 1949, Pennington went on to perform with Lefty Frizzell and record several rockabilly singles on the Federal Records label in the mid-1950s as Joe Penny. Pennington is inducted in the Rockabilly Hall of Fame.

Pennington died in 2020 at age 92.

== Discography ==
- 1958 - "Bip A Little, Bop A Lot" b/w "Mercy, Mercy, Percy" (Federal 12322)
