= Memorial Album (Hank Williams album) =

Studio album by Hank Williams
- Released: 1953
- Recorded: 1950–1952
- Genre: Country
- Label: MGM
- Producer: Fred Rose

Hank Williams chronology
Moanin' the Blues (1952)	Memorial Album (1953)	Hank Williams as Luke the Drifter (1953)

Memorial Album is the first Hank Williams LP issued by MGM Records after the singer's death on New Year's Day 1953.

== Background ==
Memorial Album is significant for being the first MGM retrospective of Hank Williams' career. Only two LPs had been released under Williams' name during his lifetime, largely because singles were most valued in the country music business, but demand for his work increased after his death. Colin Escott observed in his 2004 book Hank Williams: The Biography, "The emerging LP market was a godsend. MGM could endlessly repackage Hank's recordings, and [publishing company] Acuff-Rose could pitch his songs to other artists as LP filler." While Hank Williams Sings (1951) and Moanin' the Blues (1952) had contained several non-charting B-sides dating back to Hank's earliest recordings with the label, Memorial Album featured many of his most recent hits singles. Several versions of the album were released by MGM.

== Track listing ==
All songs written by Hank Williams unless otherwise indicated:

1. "Cold, Cold Heart"
2. "Your Cheatin' Heart"
3. "Settin' the Woods on Fire" (Fred Rose, Eddie Nelson)
4. "Kaw-Liga" (Hank Williams, Fred Rose)
5. "You Win Again"
6. "I Could Never Be Ashamed of You"
7. "Hey Good Lookin'"
8. "Half as Much" (Curley Williams)

== Sources ==
- Escott, Colin; Merritt, George; MacEwen, William (2004). Hank Williams: The Biography. New York: Little, Brown.
