= Never Again (Will I Knock on Your Door) =

Single by Hank Williams
- B-side: "Calling You"
- Published: November 30, 1948 Acuff-Rose Publications
- Released: January 1947
- Recorded: December 11, 1946
- Studio: WSM Studio
- Genre: Country
- Length: 2:40
- Label: Sterling
- Songwriter(s): Hank Williams
- Producer(s): Fred Rose

Hank Williams singles chronology
"Never Again (Will I Knock on Your Door)" (1947)	"Wealth Won't Save Your Soul" (1947)

"Never Again (Will I Knock on Your Door)" is a song written and recorded by Hank Williams. It was the singer's first single released on Sterling Records in 1947.

== Background ==
In 1946, Sterling Records was looking for "hillbilly" singer to complement its jazz, pop, and R&B series, so producer Fred Rose signed Williams, who he had come to know through singer Molly O'Day recording several of his compositions. Williams was backed on the session by the Willis Brothers, who also went by the name of the Oklahoma Wranglers: James "Guy" Willis (guitar), Vic Wallis (accordion), Charles "Skeeter" Willis (fiddle), and Charles "Indian" Wright (bass). WSM's recording quality was poor, and the muddy overall sound was made worse by Sterling's pressing quality The single did not chart, but it sold well enough to impress Rose, who would eventually push to have Williams signed to MGM Records. In January 1948 the song was re-issued as the B-side to Williams' monster smash "Lovesick Blues" and reached #6.

Hank Williams, Jr. also covered the song for the 1996 album Three Hanks: Men with Broken Hearts.

== Bibliography ==
- Escott, Colin (2004). Hank Williams: The Biography. Back Bay. ISBN 0-316-73497-7.
