= Drifting Cowboys =

American musical group

The Drifting Cowboys
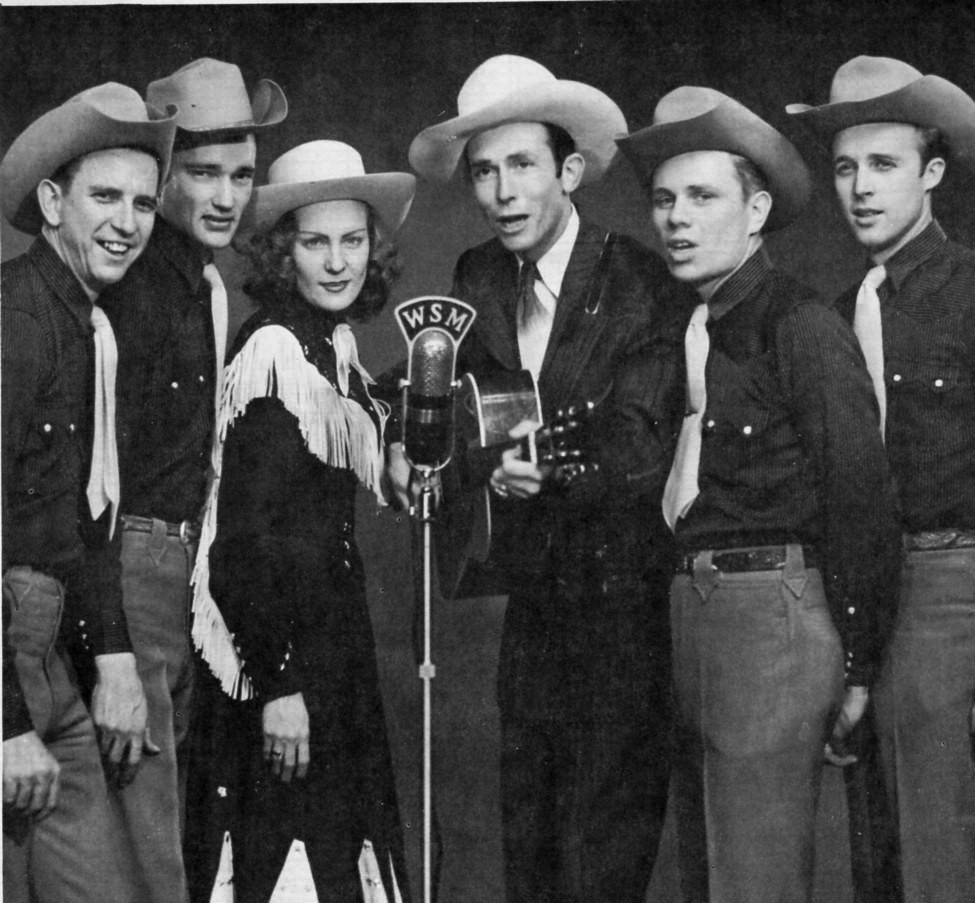
- Hank Williams and the Drifting Cowboys performing on WSM

Background information
- Genres: Country; honky-tonk; blues
- Instruments: Guitar; bass; steel guitar
- Years active: 1937–1951; 1955–1957; 1977–1991
- Label: Sterling

The Drifting Cowboys were the backing group for American country legend and singer-songwriter Hank Williams. The band went through several lineups during Williams' career. The original lineup was formed in 1937, changing musicians from show to show until Williams signed with Sterling Records.

The lineup was further modified in the following years, with the most famous version of the group formed in 1949 for Williams' appearance on the Grand Ole Opry. Although the Drifting Cowboys were credited on Williams' records, until 1950, Williams was backed by session musicians on recordings, with the label crediting the Cowboys. In 1951, Williams disbanded the group. After his death, the band was used for a short time by Ray Price. Former members later toured under the name of the band.

== History ==
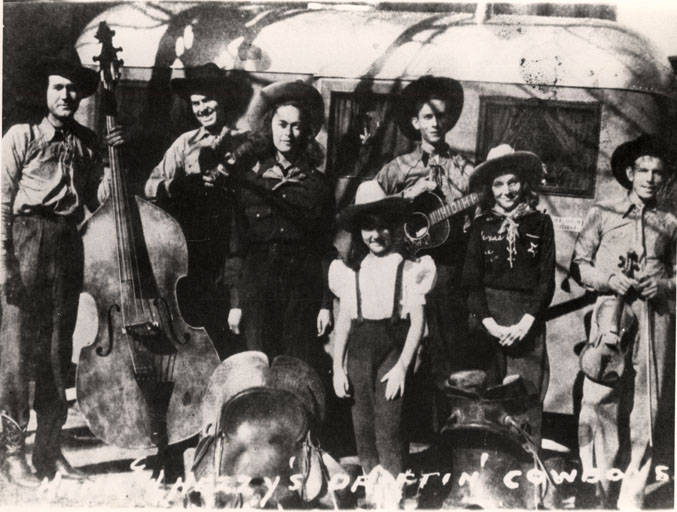
Original lineup of the Drifting Cowboys, 1938

Hank Williams formed the original Drifting Cowboys band between 1937 and 1938 in Montgomery, Alabama. The name was derived from Williams' love of Western films, with him and the band wearing cowboy hats and boots. The original line-up consisted of Braxton Schuffert (guitar), Freddie Beach (fiddle), and the comedian Smith "Hezzy" Adair. The youngest member of the band was thirteen-year-old steel guitar player James E. Porter. During the 1930s, the Drifting Cowboys varied from one show to another, with members playing a few shows before leaving and being replaced. In 1944, Don Helms joined the band playing the steel guitar, and Sammy Pruett on guitar, however both left the band after a year.

When Williams signed with Sterling Records, he formed a new band: R.D Norred (steel guitar), Joe Pennington (guitar), Herbert "Lum" York (bass) and Winston Todd (guitar). Hank and Audrey Williams requested a loan to buy the band matching outfits that they wore on performances. The band was renewed by Williams for his first appearance on the Louisiana Hayride in 1948, with Bob McNett (guitar), "Lum" York (bass), Tony Francini (fiddle), Felton Pruett (steel guitar) and Clent Holmes (guitar).

For his June 1949 debut at the Grand Ole Opry, Williams formed the most famous version of the Drifting Cowboys: Bob McNett (guitar), Hillous Butrum (bass), Jerry Rivers (fiddle) and Don Helms (steel guitar). Until 1950, Williams' songs were recorded with session musicians, with the label crediting the backing to the Drifting Cowboys Band. In 1950, McNett and Butrum left the band, being replaced by Sammy Pruett and Cedric Rainwater. In 1951, before undergoing back surgery and not knowing how long he would be unable to tour, Williams disbanded the group. During 1952, he was not backed by the Drifting Cowboys. After his death, the band was used for a short time by Ray Price, until Price rebuilt his backing band in 1953 as the Cherokee Cowboys. Band members would later tour as the Drifting Cowboys for several years.

== Members ==
Original lineup

- Braxton Schuffert – guitar
- Freddie Beach – fiddle
- Smith "Hezzy" Adair – bass, harmonica

Main members

- Don Helms – steel guitar
- Jerry Rivers – fiddle
- Bob McNett and Sammy Pruett – guitar
- Hillous Butrum, Cedric Rainwater, Herbert "Lum" York – bass

=== Other members ===
- Felton Pruett
- Clent Holmes
- Joe Pennington
- Lemuel Curtis Crysel
- Daniel Jack Boling
- Louis Brown
- Clyde Criswell
- Zeke Crittenden
- Little Joe Stanley
- Richard Paul Dennis Jr
- Allen Dunkin
- Willie Harper
- James Porter
- Carl "Wimpy" Jones
- Dan Furmanik
- Bill Drake
- Mitt (Ike) Isaiah DeRamus Sr.
