= Wealth Won't Save Your Soul =

Single by Hank Williams
- B-side: "When God Comes and Gathers His Jewels"
- Published: November 30, 1948 Acuff-Rose Publications
- Released: February 1947
- Recorded: December 11, 1946
- Studio: WSM Studio, Nashville
- Genre: Country
- Length: 2:45
- Label: Sterling
- Songwriter: Hank Williams
- Producer: Fred Rose

Hank Williams singles chronology
"Never Again (Will I Knock on Your Door)" (1947)	"Wealth Won't Save Your Soul" (1947)	"My Love for You (Has Turned to Hate)" (1947)

"Wealth Won't Save Your Soul" is a song written and recorded by Hank Williams. It was paired with "When God Comes and Gather His Jewels" for his second single release on Sterling Records in February 1947.

== Background ==
Williams earliest musical education came from attending the Mt. Olive Baptist Church near Georgina, Alabama as a child with his mother, and, by all accounts, the music of the church remained an indelible part of Hank's life and music. His earliest success as a songwriter came from writing gospel songs, and he would go on to compose the standard "I Saw the Light." In the American Masters documentary about Williams, former Drifting Cowboy R.D. Norred recalls, "Hank was kind of a highly religious person. Boy, he believed in them old gospel songs." He recorded the song on December 11, 1946 at WSM Studio in Nashville with Fred Rose producing and was backed on the session by the Willis Brothers, who also went by the name of the Oklahoma Wranglers: James "Guy" Willis (guitar), Vic Wallis (accordion), Charles "Skeeter" Willis (fiddle), and Charles "Indian" Wright (bass).
