= I'm a Long Gone Daddy =

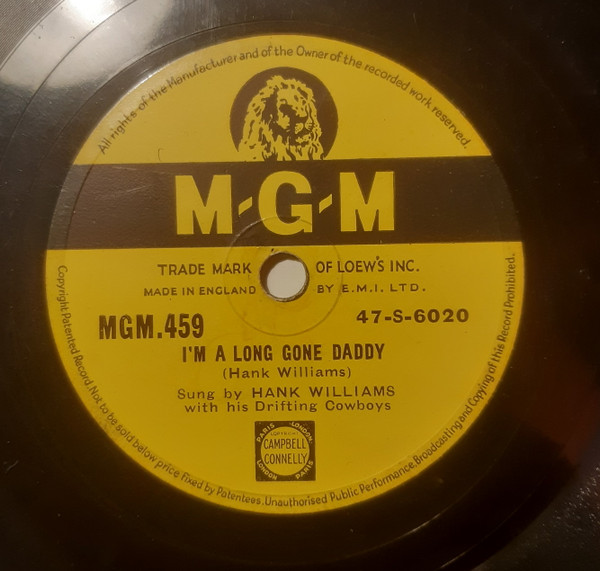

Single by Hank Williams With His Drifting Cowboys
- B-side: "The Blues Come Around"
- Published: August 13, 1948 Acuff-Rose Publications
- Released: June 1948
- Recorded: November 6, 1947
- Studio: Castle Studio, Nashville
- Genre: Hillbilly, honky-tonk, country blues
- Length: 2:59
- Label: MGM 10212
- Songwriter: Hank Williams
- Producer: Fred Rose

Hank Williams With His Drifting Cowboys singles chronology
"Honky Tonkin'" (1948)	"I'm a Long Gone Daddy" (1948)	"I Saw the Light" (1948)

"I'm a Long Gone Daddy" is a country song written and recorded by Hank Williams. It was released in 1948 on MGM Records and became his second top ten hit.

== Background ==
"I'm a Long Gone Daddy" laid the blueprint for what would become the typical Williams A-side: an up-tempo honky tonk song in the Ernest Tubb tradition with a bluesy edge. The song was recorded in anticipation of a recording ban that would result from the American Federation of Musicians possibly calling a strike at the end of December when agreements with all the record companies expired. Producer Fred Rose wanted eight usable sides that could be doled out over the length of the strike. It was recorded on November 6, 1947, at Castle Studio in Nashville. Williams was supported by a group that producer Rose assembled from two Grand Ole Opry bands: Zeke Turner (lead guitar), Jerry Byrd (steel guitar), and Louis Ennis (rhythm guitar) were from Red Foley's band while Chubby Wise (fiddle) was a member of Bill Monroe's band. Rose may have played piano. The same session produced "I Can't Get You Off of My Mind," a second recording of "Honky Tonkin'," and the Rose composition "Rootie Tootie".

== Chart performance ==
Chart (1948)	Peak position
U.S. Billboard Most Played Juke Box Folk Records	6

== Cover versions ==
- Bobby Helms recorded a version in the 1950s.
- Ernest Tubb recorded the song in 1959.
- Hank Williams, Jr. recorded it for his 1964 album Sings the Songs of Hank Williams. In 1996, he recorded it again with his son Hank III using Williams' 1947 vocal as part of their Three Hanks: Men with Broken Hearts.
- George Jones recorded the song twice, the first time on his 1987 album Too Wild Too Long. Another unreleased version was included on the LP A Collection of My Best Recollection.
- The The recorded the song for their 1994 album Hanky Panky.

== Popular culture ==
- Bruce Springsteen quotes the song's title in "Born in the U.S.A." ("I'm a long gone daddy in the U.S.A.!")
