= Wedding Bells (Hank Williams song) =

Single by Hank Williams With His Drifting Cowboys
- B-side: "I've Just Told Mama Goodbye"
- Published: November 21, 1947 Hometown Music Co., Inc.
- Released: May 1, 1949
- Recorded: March 20, 1949
- Studio: Castle Studio, Nashville
- Genre: Hillbilly, Honky-tonk, Country blues
- Length: 2:54
- Label: MGM 10401
- Songwriter: Claude Boone

Hank Williams With His Drifting Cowboys singles chronology
| "Lovesick Blues" (1949) | "Wedding Bells" (1949) | "Mind Your Own Business" (1949) |

"Wedding Bells" is a song written by Claude Boone and recorded by Hank Williams on MGM Records. It peaked at No. 2 on the Best Selling Retail Folk chart in 1949.

== Background ==
"Wedding Bells" was first recorded by the Knoxville radio veteran Bill Carlisle on King Records in 1947. According to the country music historian Colin Escott, Claude Boone, who played guitar for the Knoxville bluegrass star Carl Story, bought the song for 25 dollars from James Arthur Pritchett, a local musician and alcoholic who performed under the name "Arthur Q. Smith". The song's narrator describes his despair over the love of his life marrying another man. According to Boone, Williams called it "the prettiest song he'd ever heard". Williams recorded it at Castle Studio in Nashville on March 20, 1949, with Fred Rose producing and was supported by Dale Potter (fiddle), Don Davis (steel guitar), Zeb Turner (electric guitar), Jack Shook (rhythm guitar) and Velma Williams (bass). "Wedding Bells" was significant because it was the first single following Williams' biggest hit, "Lovesick Blues".

The recording session for "Wedding Bells" took place after Williams' first ever flight. He telegrammed the producer Fred Rose before takeoff, "Flight 58 will arrive at 5:45. I hope."

== Cover versions ==
- Buddy Williams covered it in Australia in 1951
- Hank Snow covered the song in 1957.
- It was recorded by Marty Robbins in 1958.
- George Jones recorded it for his 1962 LP My Favorites of Hank Williams.
- Jerry Lee Lewis included the song on his 1967 LP Soul My Way, although it had been recorded several years earlier.
- Dean Martin recorded the song for his 1965 album Dean Martin Hits Again.
- Charlie Rich covered the song on his 1967 album Charlie Rich Sings Country and Western.
- It was featured as part of a Hank Williams medley on Conway Twitty's 1971 album How Much More Can She Stand.
- Glen Campbell recorded it for his Williams tribute album in 1973.
- Lissie recorded the song for her 2009 EP Why You Runnin'.
- It was recorded by Bill Anderson in 1968.
- Australian Reg Lindsay included his version on the album Reg Lindsay Classics, c 1981.
- Margo Smith released a version in 1982 that peaked at number 78 on the Billboard Hot Country Singles chart.
- Australian Dusty Rankin covered the song on his album, A Portrait of Dusty, 1974.
- D.L. Menard known as the "Cajun Hank Williams" recorded his version for his 1984 Rounder Records album "Cajun Saturday Night".
- John Prine covered the song with Lucinda Williams singing "Let's Turn Back The Years" on the same track for his 1999 album, In Spite of Ourselves.
