= Lovesick Blues =

1949 single by Hank Williams

Single by Hank Williams with His Drifting Cowboys
- B-side: "Never Again (Will I Knock on Your Door)"
- Written: 1921
- Published: April 3, 1922 Jack Mills, Inc., November 1, 1949 Mills Music, Inc., Acuff-Rose Publications, Inc.
- Released: February 11, 1949
- Recorded: December 22, 1948
- Studio: Herzog Studio, Cincinnati
- Genre: Country, Honky-tonk
- Length: 2:45
- Label: MGM 10352
- Composer: Cliff Friend
- Lyricist: Irving Mills
- Producer: Fred Rose

Hank Williams with His Drifting Cowboys singles chronology
"A Mansion on the Hill" (1948)	"Lovesick Blues" (1949)	"Wedding Bells" (1949)

Audio sample
- Hank Williams – "Lovesick Blues": file; help

"Lovesick Blues" is a Tin Pan Alley song, composed by Cliff Friend, with lyrics by Irving Mills. It first appeared in the 1922 musical "Oh, Ernest", and was recorded that year by Elsie Clark and Jack Shea. Emmett Miller recorded it in 1925 and 1928, followed by country music singer Rex Griffin in 1939. The recordings by Griffin and Miller inspired Hank Williams to perform the song during his first appearances on the Louisiana Hayride radio show in 1948. Receiving an enthusiastic reception from the audience, Williams decided to record his own version despite initial push back from his producer Fred Rose (a former 1920s Tin Pan Alley songwriter) and his band.

MGM Records released "Lovesick Blues" in February 1949, and it became an overnight success, quickly reaching number one on Billboard's Top Country & Western singles chart and number 24 on the Most Played in Jukeboxes list. After a 42 week run, 16 of those weeks at number 1, the publication named it the top country and western record of the year, while Cashbox named it "Best Hillbilly Record of the Year". It was the biggest hit of Hank Williams' career.

Several cover versions of the song have been recorded. The most popular, Frank Ifield's 1962 version, topped the UK Singles Chart. In 2004, Williams' version was added to the National Recording Registry. Miller's 1928 recording was inducted into the Grammy Hall of Fame in 2007, and Williams' 1949 recording in 2011.

== Background and recordings ==
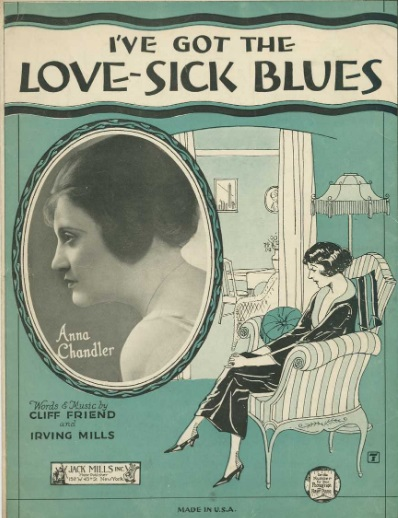
First sheet music, published in 1922

"Lovesick Blues" was originally titled "I've Got the Love-sick Blues," and published by Jack Mills, Inc. in 1922; Irving Mills wrote the lyrics and Cliff Friend composed the music. It was first performed by Anna Chandler in the Tin Pan Alley musical Oh! Ernest and recorded by Elsie Clark on March 21, 1922, with Okeh Records. Following the recording, Friend and Mills copyrighted the song on April 3, 1922. It was featured in a show at the Boardwalk Club in New York City in June 1922 and recorded by Jack Shea (aka Irving Kaufman) on Vocalion Records later that summer.

On September 1, 1925, OKeh Records sent scout Ralph Peer and a recording crew to Asheville, North Carolina. Among the aspiring artists recorded by Peer was Emmett Miller. Accompanied by Walter Rothrock on the piano, Miller cut four sides for the label, including "Lovesick Blues". The single was paired with "Big Bad Bill (is Sweet William Now)" and released in November 1925. On June 12, 1928, accompanied by the Georgia Crackers (Tommy Dorsey, Jimmy Dorsey, Eddie Lang, and Leo McConville), Miller re-recorded the song, which was released to weak sales.

Eleven years later, Miller's version was covered by country music singer Rex Griffin. Like Hank Williams, Griffin was a prolific songwriter who was rarely inspired to record compositions other than his own. Griffin rearranged the song by using the original chorus – "I got a feeling called the blues" as a verse, and turning the verse "I'm in love, I'm in love, with a beautiful gal" into the new chorus. He added several yodels that emphasised the pain of the singer. Though it was his final session for Decca Records, he was eventually inducted by the Nashville Songwriters Hall of Fame, in recognition of songs like "The Last Letter" and "The Lovesick Blues." His recording on September 25, 1939 was the first "Hillbilly" version (equivalent to today's "Country music") of the latter, and it was his arrangement that Hank Williams later "imitated and immortalized", in December 1948.

== Hank Williams recording ==
Hank Williams, who heard both the Miller and Griffin versions, started performing the song on the Louisiana Hayride shortly after joining in August 1948. Horace Logan, the show's producer and programming director for KWKH, reported that the audience "went crazy" the first time Williams performed the song on the show. In light of the live audience's strong positive reaction, Williams decided to record the song. His decision was questioned by his musicians and also his producer, Fred Rose, who felt that the song did not merit a recording. Williams, mindful of the reaction he received live, persisted, and the recording took place during the final half-hour of a session recorded at Herzog Studio in Cincinnati, Ohio, on December 22, 1948. For this recording, Williams replaced the jazz musicians with a modern country music band, using a rhythm guitar, mandolin, string bass, drums and a steel guitar. Williams' session band was composed of Clyde Baum (mandolin), Zeke Turner (electric guitar), Jerry Byrd (steel guitar), Louis Innis (rhythm guitar), Tommy Jackson (fiddle) and Willie Thawl (bass).

With little time left, Byrd and Turner replicated the musical arrangement they previously used on an Ernest Tubb session for a cover of Jimmie Rodgers' "Waiting for a Train". In the episode of American Masters about Williams, Drifting Cowboy Don Helms recalls, "When they recorded 'Lovesick Blues,' Fred told Hank, 'That song's out of meter! Got too many bars in it. And you hold that note too long.' And Hank said, 'Well, when I find a note I like, I wanna hold on to it as long as I can,' you know, just tryin' to be funny. And Fred said, 'Well, I'll tell you what I'm gonna do. That thing is so much out of meter, I'm gonna get me a cup of coffee and when I get back maybe y'all have that thing cut.' And they did, but it was still out of meter. So Fred lived with that the rest of his life." Williams combined Griffin's lyrical arrangement with a two-beat honky-tonk track, borrowing the yodeling and beat drops from Miller's recording. "Lovesick Blues" was recorded in two takes.

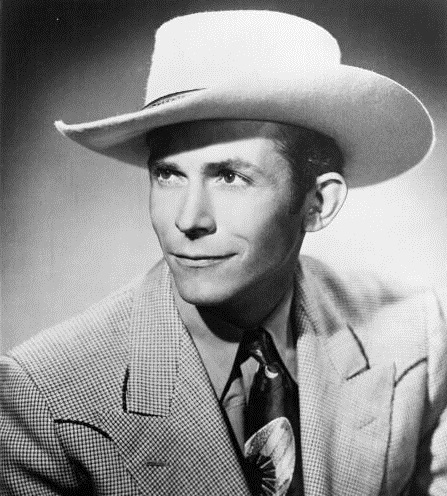
Hank Williams, depicted on an MGM publicity portrait

MGM released "Lovesick Blues" on February 11, 1949, coupling it with "Never Again (Will I Knock On Your Door)". The single sold 50,000 copies in the first two weeks. On its February 26, 1949, review, Billboard opined: "Hank's razz-mah-tazz approach and ear-catching yodeling should keep this side spinning". Based on votes sent to Billboard, the record was rated with 85 points by disc jockeys, 82 by record dealers and 85 by jukebox operators. Between the three, the track scored an overall of 84. In reference to its 100-point scale, Billboard regarded the record as "Excellent". It reached number one on Billboard's Top C&W singles, where it remained for sixteen weeks and reached number twenty-four on Most Played in Jukeboxes. The magazine listed it as the "number one country and western record of 1949" while Cashbox named it "Best Hillbilly record of the year".

In March 1949, Wesley Rose requested Williams to send him the records by Griffin and Miller to prove that the song was in the public domain. Despite the prior recordings, it was published by Acuff-Rose Publications, Nashville, on March 21, 1949. Irving Mills, the original lyricist, and president of publisher Mills Music, Inc., sued Acuff-Rose. In less than three months, with the case still pending, Acuff-Rose Publications, Inc. assigned its March copyright to Mills Music, Inc. on July 29, 1949. "Lovesick Blues" was already at the top of the "Most Played Juke Box (Country & Western) Records) chart", which is where it remained for 16 weeks, and a total run of 42 weeks. As the excitement was calming down, the final settlement came on November 1. It was re-published on that date as "Lovesick blues; words and music by Irving Mills and Cliff Friend, arr. by Hank Williams. © Mills Music, inc., New York; 1Nov49; on changed lyrics & music." According to author Colin Escott, it was agreed that Mills and Acuff-Rose would share the publishing of Williams' recording. Mills later gained the rest of the rights to the song when he purchased Friend's rights effective June 22, 1951.

Following the success of the song, Williams was invited to appear as a guest on the Grand Ole Opry, on June 11, 1949. After the performance, Williams received a standing ovation. "Lovesick Blues" became his signature song, which he used to close his shows. It was also his first number one hit, and garnered Williams the stage nicknames of "The Lovesick Blues Boy" and "Mr. Lovesick Blues". In 1949, the singer received second billing behind Eddy Arnold on the list of the "Year's Top Selling Folk Artists". Williams' version of the song was featured in the films The Last Picture Show (1971), Forrest Gump (1994) and The Shawshank Redemption (1994). In 2004, "Lovesick Blues" was added to the National Recording Registry by the Library of Congress.

== The Crickets recording ==
The Crickets released their cover of the song (based on Williams' version) in 1971 on the Philips label. The song appeared originally as the B-side to the single "My Rockin' Days". The recording lineup consisted of Sonny Curtis providing lead guitar and vocals, Joe Osborn on bass, Jerry Allison on drums, and Glen Hardin on piano. The song was performed live on The Old Grey Whistle Test in 1972.

== Other versions ==
- Singer Sonny James released a version of the song on the flip side of "Dear Love" in June 1957. The song peaked at number 15 on Billboard's Hot Country Songs.
- In 1957, Marty Robbins released a version of "Lovesick Blues" on "The Song of Robbins".
- In March 1960, Patsy Cline released a version of "Lovesick Blues" via Decca Records. It was backed on the B-side with the track "How Can I Face Tomorrow". Cline's version failed to become a commercial success due to a lack of promotion and advertisement from her record label.
- Floyd Cramer's 1962 instrumental version of the song peaked at 87 on the Billboard Hot 100.
- In November 1962, Frank Ifield's version of "Lovesick Blues" topped the UK Singles Chart, and reached number 44 on the Billboard Hot 100 in early 1963. Gramophone compared his singing to a "rough and raucous Jimmie Rodgers". Meanwhile, Elizabethan delivered a negative review, stating: "No true country singer would dare do to a Hank Williams number what Frank Ifield has done to 'Lovesick Blues'." The review finished by declaring that Ifield had "none of Jim Reeves' depth and character, nor of the subtle melodic quality (of) Don Gibson." By the end of February 1963, Billboard estimated that the single had sold close to a million copies worldwide.
- Charley Pride recorded "Love Sick Blues" in 1968.
- Little Richard released a version of the song arranged with what has been described as a "New Orleans rhythm" on his album The Rill Thing in 1970.
- Glen Campbell recorded a version of the song for his album, Houston (I'm Comin' to See You) in 1973.
- In 1992, George Strait released a version that reached number 24 on the Billboard Hot Country Singles. The single peaked at number 22 on RPM's Country Tracks. This chart placing broke a string of 31 consecutive top ten country hits for Strait; he would subsequently reel off another 18 top ten hits in a row after "Lovesick Blues" dropped off the chart. In all, of the 50 singles Strait issued between 1982 and late 1996, "Lovesick Blues" was the only one not to hit the top 10 on the US country charts.
- In 2018, Mason Ramsey became a viral sensation when he was recorded singing "Lovesick Blues" at a Walmart store in Harrisburg, Illinois, which led to him signing a record deal, and his version of the song was included on his debut EP, Famous.

== Chart performance ==
=== Hank Williams ===
Chart (1949)	Peak position
Billboard Hot Country Singles	1
U.S. Billboard Most Played By Disc Jockeys	24

=== Other artists ===
Year	Artist	Chart	Peak position
1949	Red Kirk	Billboard Most Played Juke Box (Country & Western) Records	14
1957	Sonny James	Billboard Most Played C&W by Jockeys	15
1962	Floyd Cramer	Billboard Pop Singles	87
1962	Frank Ifield	UK Singles Chart	1
1962	Frank Ifield	Canada	18
1963	Frank Ifield	Billboard Pop Singles	44
1975	Sonny Curtis	Billboard Hot Country Singles	78
1978	Jim Owen	Billboard Hot Country Singles	97
1992	George Strait	Canada Country Tracks (RPM)	22
1992	George Strait	Billboard Hot Country Singles	24

== See also ==
- Yodeling
