= Tommy Jackson (musician) =

American fiddler (1926–1979)

- Born: Thomas Lee Jackson Jr. March 31, 1926; Birmingham, Alabama, U.S.
- Died: December 9, 1979 (aged 53) Nashville, Tennessee, U.S.
- Genres: Country
- Instrument: Fiddle
- Years active: 1940s-1970s

Thomas Lee Jackson Jr. (March 31, 1926 – December 9, 1979) was an American fiddle player, regarded as "one of the finest commercial fiddle players of all time". He played on hundreds of country records from the 1940s to the 1970s, and it has been claimed that he "has probably been heard on more country records than any other musician".

== Biography ==
Born in Birmingham, Alabama, he moved to Nashville, Tennessee as a baby with his family. Something of a child prodigy as a fiddle player, he toured with Johnnie Wright and Kitty Wells, and performed as a teenager with the Curley Williams and Paul Howard bands at the Grand Ole Opry, before serving as a tail gunner in the Army Air Forces in World War II.

On his return to civilian life in 1946, he toured with Whitey Ford and others before joining Red Foley's orchestra at the Opry. He also began work as a session musician, sometimes as part of a group that also included Jerry Byrd, Louis Innis, and Zeke Turner, and became known as the first Nashville studio A-team. Jackson played on many of Hank Williams' classic recordings of the late 1940s, including "Lovesick Blues". In 1948, he and his fellow studio musicians began performing regularly as the Pleasant Valley Boys, on the Midwestern Hayride and other shows produced by radio station WLW in Cincinnati, Ohio, and also recorded as session musicians at King Records.

He returned to Nashville in the early 1950s, and recorded with Hank Williams, Webb Pierce, Faron Young, and many others. Between the late 1940s and 1960s he also recorded many hoedown albums under his own name, for the Mercury, Decca, and Dot labels, many of his recordings now being regarded as the definitive versions. He developed his own recognizable styles of playing, such as the single-string playing that he introduced on Ray Price's 1956 hit "Crazy Arms". He played on almost all of Price's recordings through to the mid-1960s, as well as those by George Jones and Bill Monroe, and became Nashville's most in-demand studio fiddle player over the period.

His studio work largely dried up during the 1970s as younger players took over. He died in Nashville in 1979 at the age of 53.
