= Sterling Records (US) =

New York record label active from 1945 to 1947

- Founded: 1945
- Country of origin: United States

Sterling Records Inc. was a small New York record label active from 1945 to 1947. Sterling's first record, with number 100, was Lillette Thomas and her Boys' 78 rpm "Blues for My Daddy". The record company ceased issuing in 1947, and in 1948 Al Trace sued Sterling and obtained an injunction against their use of his name on a recording. Sterling Records, LLC is now a South Florida-based record company owned and operated by Stephen Caputo and Joe Brickman.

== Hank Williams ==
Sterling was notable for issuing early records by Hank Williams before Williams signed to MGM Records. Record issue numbers 201, 204, 208 and 210 were Hank Williams releases.

== See also ==
- Maureen McGovern - who recorded for a Sterling Records in New York in 1996.
- List of record labels
