= Hank Williams =

American singer, songwriter, and musician (1923–1953)

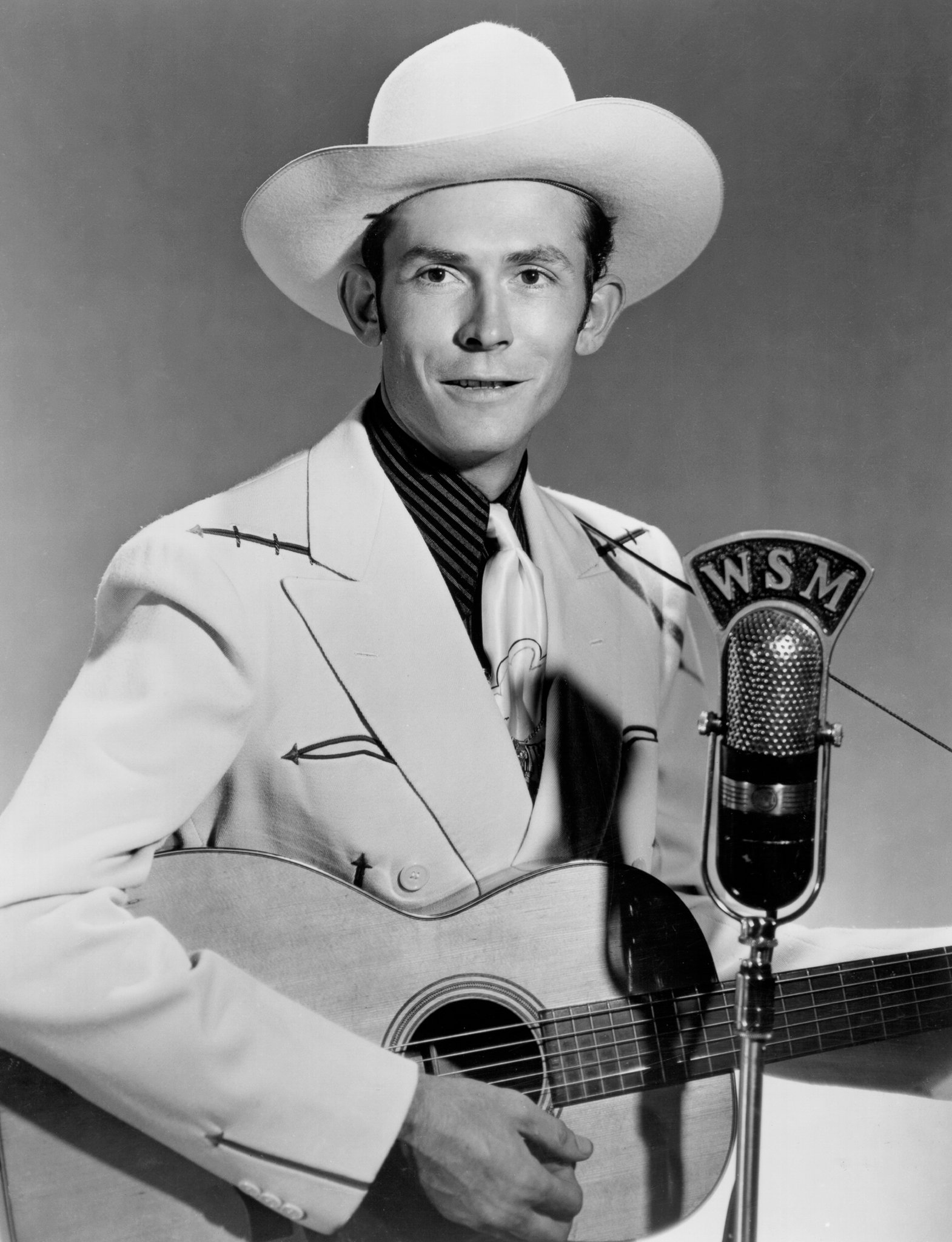
- Williams in a 1948 promotional photo for WSM
- Born: Hiram Williams; September 17, 1923; Mount Olive, Alabama, U.S.
- Died: January 1, 1953 (aged 29); Oak Hill, West Virginia, U.S.
- Resting place: Oakwood Annex Cemetery, Montgomery, Alabama, U.S. 32.3847°N 86.2913°W
- Other names: The Singing Kid; Lovesick Blues Boy; Luke the Drifter; The Hillbilly Shakespeare
- Occupations: Singer; songwriter; musician
- Years active: 1937–1953
- Spouses: Audrey Sheppard (m. 1944; div. 1952) Billie Jean Jones (m. 1952)
- Children: Hank Williams Jr.; Jett Williams
- Relatives: Hank Williams III (grandson); Holly Williams (granddaughter); Sam Williams (grandson); Coleman Williams (great-grandson)
- Musical career
- Genres: Country; Western; honky-tonk; gospel; blues; rockabilly
- Instruments: Vocals; guitar; fiddle
- Labels: Sterling; MGM
- Formerly of: The Drifting Cowboys

Signature
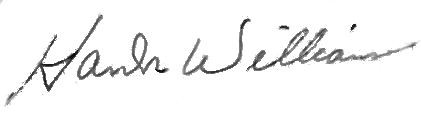

Hiram "Hank" Williams (Note: His middle name is often misreported as "King", which originated from a misunderstanding that he was named after King Hiram I. However, this name is not present on his birth certificate or any other documentation Williams signed during his life.) (September 17, 1923 – January 1, 1953) was an American singer, songwriter, and musician. An early pioneer of country music, he is regarded as one of the most significant and influential musicians of the 20th century. Williams recorded 55 singles that reached the top 10 of the Billboard Country & Western Best Sellers chart, 5 of which were released posthumously, and 12 of which reached No. 1.

Born and raised in Alabama, Williams learned guitar from blues musician Rufus Payne. Both Payne and Roy Acuff significantly influenced his musical style. After winning an amateur talent contest, Williams began his professional career in Montgomery in the late 1930s playing on local radio stations and at area venues such as school houses, movie theaters, and bars. He formed the Drifting Cowboys backup band, which was managed by his mother, and dropped out of school to devote his time to his career. Because his alcoholism made him unreliable, he was fired and rehired several times by radio station WSFA. Williams also had trouble replacing several of his band members who were drafted during World War II.

In 1944, Williams married Audrey Sheppard, who competed with his mother to control his career. After recording "Never Again" and "Honky Tonkin'" with Sterling Records, he signed a contract with MGM Records. He released the hit single "Move It On Over" in 1947 and joined the Louisiana Hayride radio program. The next year he released a cover of "Lovesick Blues", which quickly reached number one on Billboard's Top Country & Western singles chart and propelled him to stardom on the Grand Ole Opry. Although unable to read or notate music to any significant degree, he wrote such iconic hits as "Your Cheatin' Heart", "Hey, Good Lookin'", and "I'm So Lonesome I Could Cry". During his final years, he struggled with back pain and substance abuse, exacerbating the strain on his relationships with Audrey and the Grand Ole Opry.

Williams died on New Year's Day 1953 at the age of 29, his heart failing in the back seat of a car near Oak Hill, West Virginia, en route to a concert in Canton, Ohio. Despite his relatively brief career, he is one of the most celebrated and influential musicians of the 20th century, especially in country music. Many artists have covered his songs and he has influenced Chuck Berry, Elvis Presley, Waylon Jennings, Johnny Cash, Bob Dylan, and the Rolling Stones, among others. He was inducted into the Country Music Hall of Fame in 1961, the Songwriters Hall of Fame in 1970, the Rock and Roll Hall of Fame in 1987, the Native American Music Awards Hall of Fame in 1999, and gained a star on the Hollywood Walk of Fame. In 2010, he was posthumously awarded a Pulitzer Prize Special Citation for his "craftsmanship as a songwriter who expressed universal feelings with poignant simplicity and played a pivotal role in transforming country music into a major musical and cultural force in American life." His life and career were dramatized in the 1964 biopic Your Cheatin' Heart and the 2015 biopic I Saw the Light.

== Early life ==
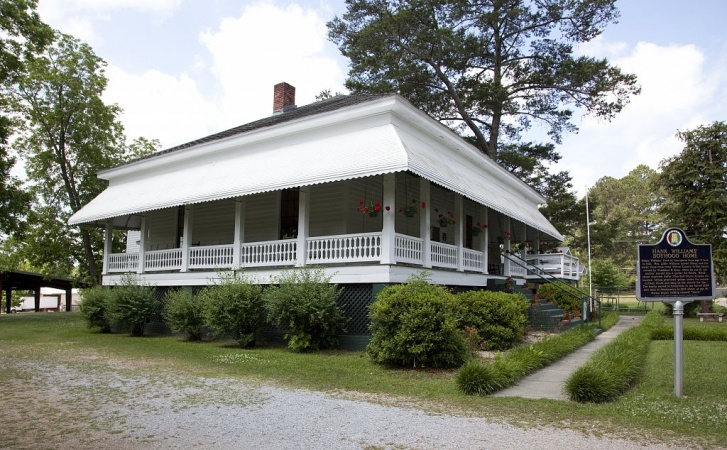
Williams' family house in Georgiana, Alabama

Hiram Williams was born on September 17, 1923, in the rural community of Mount Olive in Butler County, Alabama. His name was misspelled as "Hiriam" on his birth certificate, which was prepared and signed when he was 10 years old. He was the third child of Jessie Lilliebelle "Lillie" (née Skipper; 1898–1955) and Elonzo Huble "Lon" Williams (1891–1970). Williams was of English and Welsh ancestry. Elonzo's family came from south and central Alabama, and his father fought during the American Civil War, first on the Confederate side, and then with the Union after he was captured. Elonzo was a railroad engineer for the W. T. Smith lumber company and was drafted during World War I, serving from July 1918 to June 1919. He suffered severe injuries after falling from a truck, breaking his collarbone, and receiving a severe blow to the head.

The Williams' first child, Ernest Huble Williams, died two days after his birth on July 5, 1921. A daughter, Irene, was born a year later. Williams was born with spina bifida occulta, a birth defect of the spinal column that caused him lifelong pain and became a major factor in his later abuse of alcohol and other drugs. At the age of three, Williams sat with his mother as she played the organ at the Mount Olive Baptist Church. Lillie also joined singing the hymns that influenced the singer's later compositions. Williams received his first musical instrument, a harmonica, at the age of six. As a child, he was nicknamed "Harm" by his family and "Herky" or "Skeets" by his friends.

Williams' father frequently relocated for work, and as a result the family lived in several southern Alabama towns. In 1930, when Williams was seven years old, Elonzo began experiencing facial paralysis. After being evaluated at a Veterans' Administration clinic in Pensacola, Florida, doctors determined that he had a brain aneurysm, and Elonzo was sent to the VA Medical Center in Alexandria, Louisiana. He remained hospitalized for eight years and was mostly absent throughout Williams' childhood. From that point on, Lillie assumed responsibility for the family.

In the fall of 1933, Williams was sent to live with his aunt and uncle, Walter and Alice McNeil, in Fountain, Alabama. Their daughter, Opal, went in exchange to live with Lillie to attend school in Georgiana, Alabama. Williams learned to play basic guitar chords from his aunt and listened to music that was played at dances and in area churches. The following year, the Williams family moved to Greenville, Alabama, where Lillie opened a boarding house next to the local cotton gin. The family later returned with Opal McNeil to Georgiana, where Lillie took several side jobs to support the family despite the bleak economic climate of the Great Depression. She worked in a cannery and served as a night-shift nurse in the local hospital. Their first house burned down, and the family lost their possessions. They moved to Rose Street on the other side of town, into a house which Williams' mother soon turned into another boarding house. The house had a small garden in which they grew diverse crops that Williams and his sister Irene sold around Georgiana. At a chance meeting in Georgiana, Williams' sister Irene met U.S. Representative J. Lister Hill while Hill was campaigning across Alabama. She told Hill that her mother was interested in talking to him about her problems. With Hill's help, the family began collecting Elonzo's disability pension. Despite his medical condition, the family managed fairly well financially throughout the Great Depression.

My Bucket's Got a Hole in It
The popular song "My Bucket's Got a Hole in It" became a hit for Hank Williams in 1949.

There are several versions of how Williams got his first guitar. While several prominent Georgiana residents later claimed to have bought it for him, his mother said she bought it for him and that she arranged for his first lessons. Williams told Ralph Gleason, who at the time was writing a weekly music column in the San Francisco Chronicle, "When I was about eight years old, I got my first git-tar. A second-hand $3.50 git-tar my mother bought me." Gawky and shy, Williams attached himself to Rufus "Tee-Tot" Payne, a street performer whom Williams followed around town. Payne gave Williams guitar lessons in exchange for money or meals prepared by Lillie. Payne's basic musical style was blues; he repeatedly stressed the importance of maintaining good rhythm and time, and he added the showmanship of stoops, bows, laughs and cries to his performances. Later on, Williams recorded "My Bucket's Got a Hole in It", one of the songs Payne had taught him. Williams was also influenced by country acts such as Roy Acuff. In 1937, Williams got into a fight with his physical education teacher about exercises the coach wanted him to do. His mother subsequently demanded that the school board terminate the coach; when they refused, the family moved to Montgomery, Alabama. Payne and Williams lost touch, though Payne also eventually moved to Montgomery, where he died in poverty in 1939. Williams later credited him as the provider of the only musical training he ever had.

== Career ==
=== 1930s ===
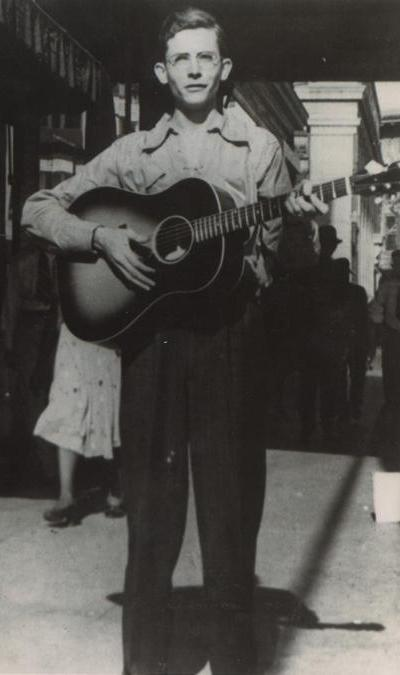
Williams performing in Montgomery in 1938

In July 1937, the Williams and McNeils opened a boarding house on South Perry Street in downtown Montgomery. It was at this time that Williams decided to change his name informally from Hiram to Hank. During the same year, he participated in a talent show at the Empire Theater and won the first prize of US$15 (equivalent to $300 in 2025) singing his first original song "WPA Blues". Williams wrote the lyrics and used the tune of Riley Puckett's "Dissatisfied".

He never learned to read music; instead he based his compositions in storytelling and personal experience. After school and on weekends, Williams sang and played his Silvertone guitar on the sidewalk in front of the WSFA radio studio. His recent win at the Empire Theater and the street performances caught the attention of WSFA producers who occasionally invited him to perform on air with Dad Crysel's band.

In August 1938, Elonzo Williams was temporarily released from the hospital. He showed up unannounced at the family's home in Montgomery. Lillie was unwilling to let him reclaim his position as the head of the household. Elonzo stayed to celebrate his son's birthday in September before he returned to the medical center in Louisiana.

Williams' successful radio appearances fueled his entry into a music career, and he started his own band for show dates, the Drifting Cowboys. The original members were guitarist Braxton Schuffert, fiddler Freddie Beach, and upright bass player and comedian Smith "Hezzy" Adair. Originally billed as "Hank and Hezzy and the Drifting Cowboys", they frequently appeared as fill-ins at the local dancehall, Thigpen's Log Cabin, just out of Georgiana. The band traveled throughout central and southern Alabama performing in clubs and at private gatherings. Lillie Williams became the Drifting Cowboys' manager. Williams dropped out of school in October 1939 so that he and the Drifting Cowboys could work full-time. Lillie Williams began booking show dates, negotiating prices and driving them to some of their shows. Now free to travel without deference to Williams' schooling, the band could tour as far away as western Georgia and the Florida Panhandle. The band started playing in theaters before the screening of films and later they played in honky-tonks. Williams' alcohol use started to become a problem during the tours; on occasion he spent a large part of the show revenues on alcohol. Meanwhile, between tour schedules, Williams returned to Montgomery to host his radio show.

=== 1940s ===
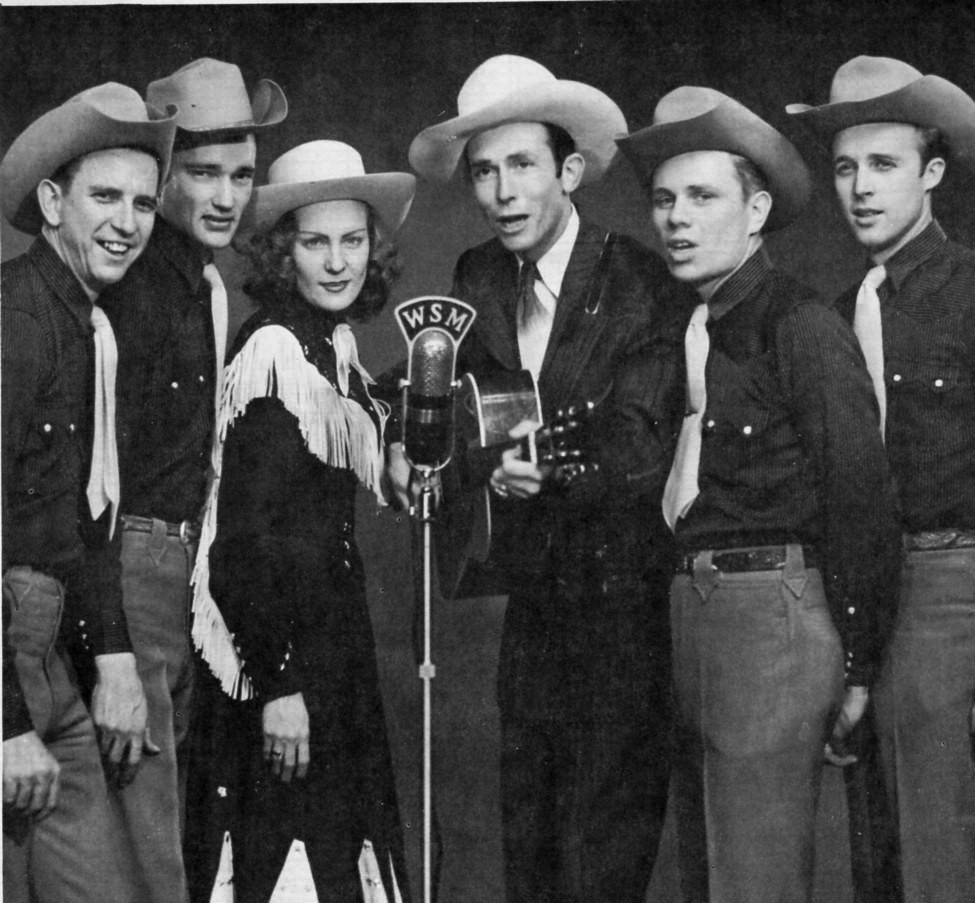
Williams, Sheppard, and the Drifting Cowboys band in 1951

The American entry into World War II in 1941 marked the beginning of hard times for Williams. While he was medically disqualified from military service after falling from a bull during a rodeo in Texas and suffering a back injury, his band members were all drafted to serve. Many of their replacements quit the band due to Williams' worsening alcoholism, and in August 1942 WSFA fired him for "habitual drunkenness". Backstage during one of his concerts, Williams met Roy Acuff, who warned him of the dangers of alcohol, saying, "You've got a million-dollar voice, son, but a ten-cent brain."

He started a job as a shipfitter's helper for the Alabama Drydock and Shipbuilding Company at Mobile in 1942, working there off and on for about a year and a half during the war. He also worked briefly at Kaiser Shipyards in Portland, Oregon, apparently lured by the free tickets, free accommodations, free training, and good wages offered by the company. In 1943, Williams met Audrey Sheppard at a medicine show in Banks, Alabama. According to Sheppard, she and Williams lived in a hotel in Mobile while they worked together at the shipyard for a short while. Sheppard told Williams that she wanted to help him regain his radio show, and that they should move to Montgomery and start a band. The couple were married in 1944 at a Texaco gas station in Andalusia, Alabama, by a justice of the peace. The marriage was technically invalid, since Sheppard's divorce from her previous husband did not comply with the legally required 60-day reconciliation period.

In 1945, back in Montgomery, Williams returned to WSFA radio. He attempted to expand his repertoire by writing original songs, and he published his first songbook, Original Songs of Hank Williams, containing "I'm Not Coming Home Anymore" and several more original songs, nine in all, including one not written by him, "A Tramp on the Street". With Williams beginning to be recognized as a songwriter, Sheppard became his manager and occasionally sang and substituted on guitar when a band member did not make the show.

On September 14, 1946, Williams auditioned for Nashville's Grand Ole Opry at the recommendation of Ernest Tubb, but was rejected. After the failure of his audition, Williams and Audrey attempted to interest the recently formed music publishing firm Acuff-Rose Music. They approached Fred Rose, the president of the company, during one of his daily ping-pong games at WSM radio studios. Audrey asked Rose if her husband could sing a song for him at that moment, Rose agreed, and perceived that Williams had much promise as a songwriter. Rose signed Williams to a six-song contract, and leveraged this deal to sign Williams with Sterling Records. On December 11, 1946, in his first recording session, Williams recorded "Wealth Won't Save Your Soul", "Calling You", "Never Again (Will I Knock on Your Door)", and "When God Comes and Gathers His Jewels", which was misprinted as "When God Comes and Fathers His Jewels". The Sterling releases of Williams' songs became successful, and Rose decided to find a larger label for future releases. The producer then approached the newly formed recording division of the Loews Corporation, MGM Records.

Lovesick Blues
A major hit for Hank Williams, "Lovesick Blues" moved him to the mainstream of country music and assured him a position in the Grand Ole Opry.

Williams signed with MGM Records in 1947 and released "Move It on Over", which became a country hit. In 1948, he moved to Shreveport, Louisiana, and joined the Louisiana Hayride, a radio show broadcast on KWKH that brought him into living rooms all over the Southeastern United States, appearing in weekend shows. As part of the arrangement, Williams got a program on the station and bookings through the Hayride's artist service to perform across western Louisiana and eastern Texas, always returning on Saturdays for the show's weekly broadcast. After a few more moderate hits, in 1949 he released his version of the 1922 Cliff Friend and Irving Mills song "Lovesick Blues", made popular by Rex Griffin. Williams' version was a hit; the song stayed at number one on the Billboard charts for four consecutive months. Following the success of the releases of "Lovesick Blues" and "Wedding Bells", Williams signed a management contract with Oscar Davis. Davis then booked the singer on a Grand Ole Opry package show, and he later negotiated Williams' induction into the musical troupe.

On June 11, 1949, Williams made his debut at the Grand Ole Opry, where he received six encores. He brought together Bob McNett (guitar), Hillous Butrum (bass), Jerry Rivers (fiddle) and Don Helms (steel guitar) to form the most famous version of the Drifting Cowboys. That year Audrey Williams gave birth to Randall Hank Williams (Hank Williams Jr.). During 1949, he joined the Grand Ole Opry's first European tour, performing in military bases in Germany and Austria. Williams had five songs that ranked in the top five Billboard Hot Country Singles that year: "Wedding Bells", "Mind Your Own Business", "You're Gonna Change (Or I'm Gonna Leave)", "My Bucket's Got a Hole in It", and "Lovesick Blues", which reached No. 1.

=== 1950s ===
By 1950, Williams earned an estimated $1,000 per show (equivalent to $13,400 in 2025). That year, he began recording as "Luke the Drifter" for his moral-themed songs, many of which are recitations rather than singing. Fred Rose had been concerned how it would affect the jukebox operators who serviced the machines at the honky-tonks where William's songs were most commonly played if a customer punched a "Hank Williams" selection on a jukebox and heard a sermon rather than the music expected. It was he who requested that Hank use a pseudonym for these recitations to avoid leading people astray. Although the real identity of Luke the Drifter was supposed to be unknown, Williams often performed part of the recorded material on stage. Most of the material was written by Williams himself, although Fred Rose wrote at least one piece, and others, according to his son Wesley, were collaborations between Williams, Rose, and himself. The songs depicted Luke the Drifter traveling around from place to place, narrating stories of different characters and philosophizing about relationships gone awry, injustice in society, and death. Performances of the compositions included only Williams' voice, an organ, a bass fiddle, and Helms' steel guitar.

Around this time Williams released more hit songs, such as "My Son Calls Another Man Daddy", "Why Should We Try Anymore", "Long Gone Lonesome Blues", "Why Don't You Love Me", and "I Just Don't Like This Kind of Livin'". In 1951, "Dear John" became a hit, but it was the B-side, "Cold, Cold Heart", that became one of his most recognized songs. A pop cover version by Tony Bennett released the same year stayed on the charts for 27 weeks, peaking at number one.

Beyond the Sunset
One characteristic of Williams' recordings as "Luke the Drifter" is the use of narration rather than singing.

Williams' career reached a peak in the late summer of 1951 with his Hadacol tour of the U.S. with Bob Hope and other actors. On the weekend after the tour ended, Williams was photographed backstage at the Grand Ole Opry signing a motion picture deal with MGM. In October, Williams recorded a demo, "There's a Tear in My Beer" for a friend, "Big Bill" Lister, who had recorded "Beer Drinking Blues", a beer drinking song that sold well, and needed another one. The session was recorded by the head of A&R for Capitol Records, Ken Nelson. Afterwards Lister stored the demo acetate, with no markings, in a box of records kept at his house, and then when he moved, in his yard under a tarp for several years. He eventually gave the acetate to Hank Williams Jr., who had a hit with it and an accompanying video which depicted the son playing with his father in an overdubbed dream sequence. The following month, MGM Records released Williams' debut album, Hank Williams Sings. On November 14, 1951, Williams drove with Bill Lister and the Drifting Cowboys to New York where he appeared on television for the first time with Perry Como on CBS's Perry Como Show. There he sang "Hey Good Lookin'", and the next week Como opened the show wearing a cowboy hat and singing the same song, with apologies to Williams.

On May 21, 1951, Williams was admitted to North Louisiana Sanitarium in Shreveport for treatment of his alcoholism and his back problem, and was released on May 24. In November of the same year, he fell trying to leap across a gully on a squirrel hunting trip with his fiddler Jerry Rivers in Franklin, Tennessee. The fall aggravated his congenital spinal condition, and on December 13, 1951, he underwent a spinal fusion at Vanderbilt University Hospital. He was discharged against medical advice on Christmas Eve wearing a back brace and consuming more painkillers, to the detriment of his already compromised health.

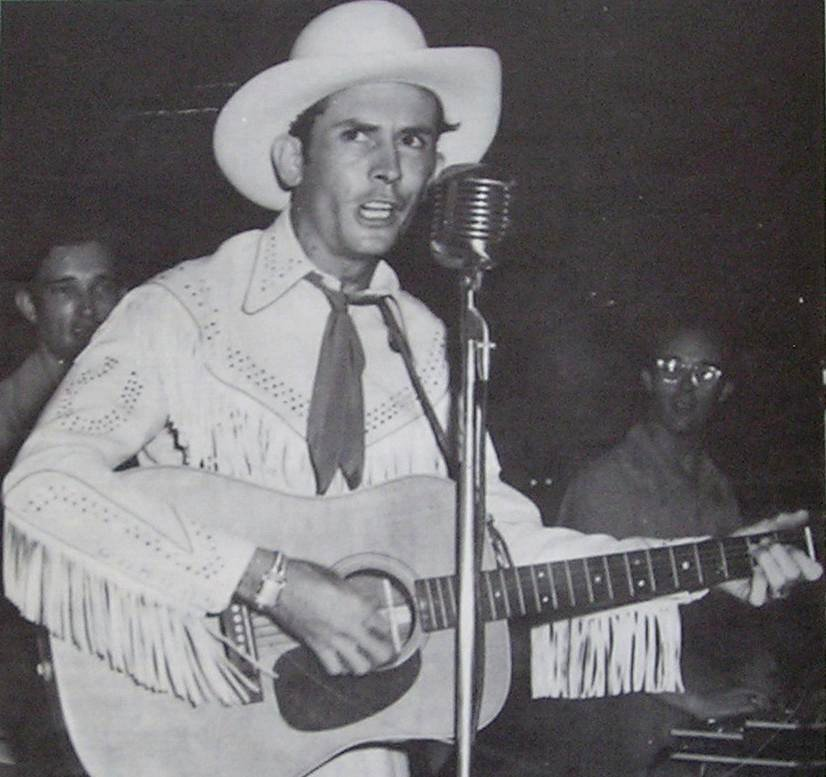
Williams performing in 1951

In the spring of 1952, Williams flew to New York City twice with his band and a Grand Ole Opry troupe to appear on two episodes of the nationally broadcast The Kate Smith Evening Hour. On March 26, he performed "Hey Good Lookin'" and joined the rest of the cast in singing "I Saw the Light". On April 23, he performed "Cold, Cold Heart" and sang a truncated "I Can't Help It (If I'm Still in Love with You)" with Anita Carter, and later joined the cast in singing "Glory Bound Train". During the same year, Williams had a brief extramarital affair with dancer Bobbie Jett, resulting in the birth of their daughter, Jett Williams.

In June 1952, he recorded "Jambalaya (On the Bayou)", "Window Shopping", "Settin' the Woods on Fire", and "I'll Never Get Out of This World Alive". Audrey Williams divorced him that year; the next day he recorded "You Win Again" and "I Won't Be Home No More". Around this time, he met Billie Jean Jones, a girlfriend of country singer Faron Young, at the Grand Ole Opry. As a girl, Jones had lived down the street from Williams when he was with the Louisiana Hayride, and now Williams began to visit her frequently in Shreveport, causing him to miss many Grand Ole Opry appearances.

On August 11, 1952, Williams was dismissed from the Grand Ole Opry for habitual drunkenness and missing shows. He returned to Shreveport to perform on KWKH and WBAM shows and in the Louisiana Hayride, for which he toured again. His performances were acclaimed when he was sober, but despite the efforts of his work associates to get him to shows sober, his abuse of alcohol resulted in occasions when he did not appear or his performances were poor. In October 1952 he married Billie Jean Jones.

During his last recording session on September 23, 1952, Williams recorded "Kaw-Liga", along with "Your Cheatin' Heart", "Take These Chains from My Heart", and "I Could Never Be Ashamed of You". By the end of 1952, Williams started to have heart problems. He met Horace "Toby" Marshall in Oklahoma City, who said that he was a doctor. Marshall had been previously convicted for forgery, and had been paroled and released from the Oklahoma State Penitentiary in 1951. Among other fake titles, he said that he was a Doctor of Science. He purchased the DSC title for $25 from the Chicago School of Applied Science; in the diploma, he requested that the DSC be spelled out as "Doctor of Science and Psychology". Under the name of Dr. C. W. Lemon he prescribed Williams with amphetamines, Seconal, chloral hydrate, and morphine, which made his heart problems worse. The final concert of his 1952 tour was held in Austin, Texas, at the Skyline Club on December 19. Williams' last known public performance took place in Montgomery, on December 21, where he sang at a benefit held by the local chapter of the American Federation of Musicians for a radio announcer who had polio.

== Personal life ==
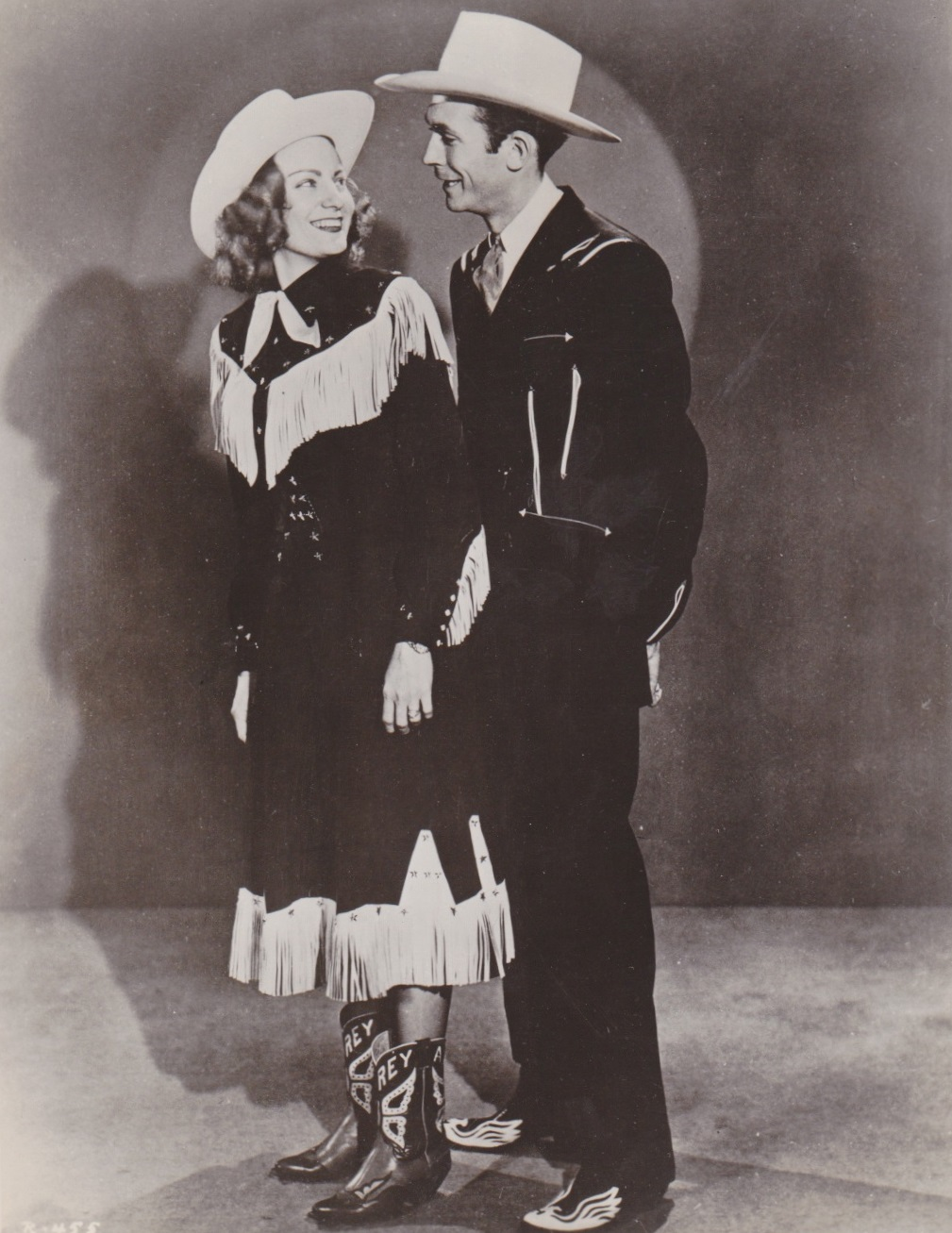
Williams and his first wife Audrey Sheppard in a publicity photo for MGM Records, c. 1952

On December 15, 1944, Williams married Audrey Sheppard. It was her second marriage and his first. Their son, Randall Hank Williams (now known as Hank Williams Jr.), was born on May 26, 1949. The marriage was always turbulent and rapidly disintegrated, and Williams developed serious problems with alcohol, morphine, and other painkillers prescribed for him to ease the severe back pain caused by his spina bifida occulta. The couple divorced on May 29, 1952.

In June 1952, Williams moved into a house on the corner of Natchez Trace and Westwood Avenue in Nashville, sharing it with singer Ray Price. Price left soon after due to Williams' alcoholism. Following an unsuccessful tour of California and several stints in a sanatorium, Williams moved to his mother's boarding house by September. A relationship with a woman named Bobbie Jett during this period resulted in a daughter, Jett Williams, who was born five days after Williams died. His mother adopted Jett, who became a ward of the state after her grandmother's death. She was adopted and raised by an unrelated couple and did not learn that she was Williams' daughter until the early 1980s.

On October 18, 1952, Williams and Billie Jean Jones were married by a justice of the peace in Minden, Louisiana. The next day, two public marriage ceremonies were held at the New Orleans Civic Auditorium, where 14,000 seats were sold for each. After Williams' death, a judge ruled that the wedding was not legal because Jones' divorce had not become final until 11 days after she married Williams. His first wife and his mother were the driving forces behind having the marriage declared invalid, and they pursued the matter for years.

A man named Lewis Fitzgerald (born 1943) claimed to be Williams' illegitimate son; he was the son of Marie McNeil, Williams' cousin. Fitzgerald was interviewed, and he suggested that Lillie Williams operated a brothel at her boarding house in Montgomery. A friend of the family denied his claims, but singer Billy Walker claimed that Williams mentioned to him the presence of men in the house who were led upstairs.

== Death ==
Williams was scheduled to perform at Municipal Auditorium in Charleston, West Virginia, on New Year's Eve, December 31, 1952. Advance ticket sales totaled $3,000 (equivalent to $36,000 in 2025). That day, Williams could not fly because of a snow storm in the Montgomery area; he hired a college student, Charles Carr, to drive him to the concerts. On December 30, Williams and Carr stopped at the Redmont Hotel in Birmingham, Alabama. The following morning, they continued to Fort Payne, and then to Knoxville, Tennessee. Williams and his driver then took a flight to Charleston, but the plane returned to Knoxville due to bad weather. Back in Knoxville, the two arrived at the Andrew Johnson Hotel, and Carr requested a doctor for Williams, who was affected by the combination of the chloral hydrate and alcohol he had consumed on the way to Knoxville.

Dr. P. H. Cardwell injected Williams with two shots of vitamin B_{12} that also contained a quarter-grain (about 16 mg) of morphine. Carr and Williams checked out of the hotel, but the porters had to carry Williams to the car. Carr later mentioned that Williams had severe hiccups, while the porters said that he had made a coughing sound twice. Carr spoke with Toby Marshall on the phone, who informed him on behalf of the tour's promoter, A.V. Bamford, that the show in Charleston was canceled and he ordered him instead to drive Williams to Canton, Ohio, for a New Year's Day concert there.

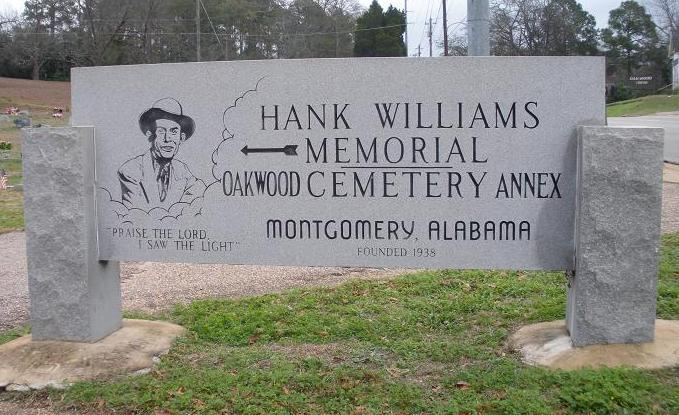
Entrance marker of the Oakwood Annex Cemetery in Montgomery, Alabama

Around midnight on January 1, 1953, the two crossed the Tennessee state line and arrived in Bristol, Virginia. They drove a few hours more past the state line into West Virginia, then stopped in the small town of Hilltop at the Skyline Drive-in restaurant, where Carr asked for a relief driver from a local taxi company, as he felt exhausted after driving for 20 hours. Driver Don Surface left the restaurant with Carr and Williams. They drove on until they stopped for fuel and coffee at a gas station in Oak Hill, West Virginia, where they realized that Williams had been dead for so long that rigor mortis had already set in. The station's owner called the local police chief. Dr. Ivan Malinin performed the autopsy at the Tyree Funeral House. He found hemorrhages in the heart and neck and pronounced the cause of death as "acute [right] ventricular dilation". He also wrote that Williams had been severely beaten and kicked in the groin recently (during a fight in a Montgomery bar a few days earlier), and local magistrate Virgil F. Lyons ordered an inquest into Williams' death concerning a welt that was visible on his head. That evening in Canton, when Williams' death was announced to the gathered crowd, a few people started laughing because they thought it was a joke. Akron DJ Cliff Rodgers assured the crowd that it was no joke and that Hank Williams was indeed dead. When Hawkshaw Hawkins and other performers started singing Williams' song "I Saw the Light" as a tribute to him, the crowd began to sing along.

On January 2, Williams' body was transported to Montgomery, Alabama, where it was placed in a silver casket that was displayed at his mother's boarding house for two days. His funeral took place on January 4 at Montgomery Auditorium, with his casket placed on the flower-covered stage. Mourners came to Montgomery from all over the South, and beyond. An estimated 15,000 to 25,000 people were outside the auditorium, and inside were 2,750, with the balcony set aside for about 200 black mourners. Hundreds passed by the casket. Backed by the Drifting Cowboys, Roy Acuff, Ernest Tubb and Red Foley performed "I Saw the Light", "Beyond the Sunset" and "Peace in the Valley". Williams' remains are interred at the Oakwood Annex in Montgomery.

In late January 1953, MGM Records told Billboard magazine that the label had to reduce their planned releases for the month from 12 records to 6 to satisfy the demand for Williams' music. The label estimated that the amount of back orders of his records, and those by other artists would cover the production of their Bloomfield, New Jersey, pressing plant until April 1953. Meanwhile, MGM Records received 3,000 direct requests for pictures of the singer, that combined with the requests from the distributors made the company outsource their printing and shipment. According to Acuff-Rose Music, the sales from the two Williams song folios jumped from their average of 700 per week to 5,000 in three weeks.

Williams' final single, released in November 1952 while he was still alive, was titled "I'll Never Get Out of This World Alive". His song "Your Cheatin' Heart" was written and recorded in September 1952, but released in late January 1953 after his death. The song, backed by "Kaw-Liga", was No. 1 on the country charts for six weeks. "Take These Chains From My Heart" was released in April 1953 and reached No. 1 on the country charts. Released in July, "I Won't Be Home No More" went to No. 4. Meanwhile, "Weary Blues From Waitin'" reached No. 7.

== Legacy ==
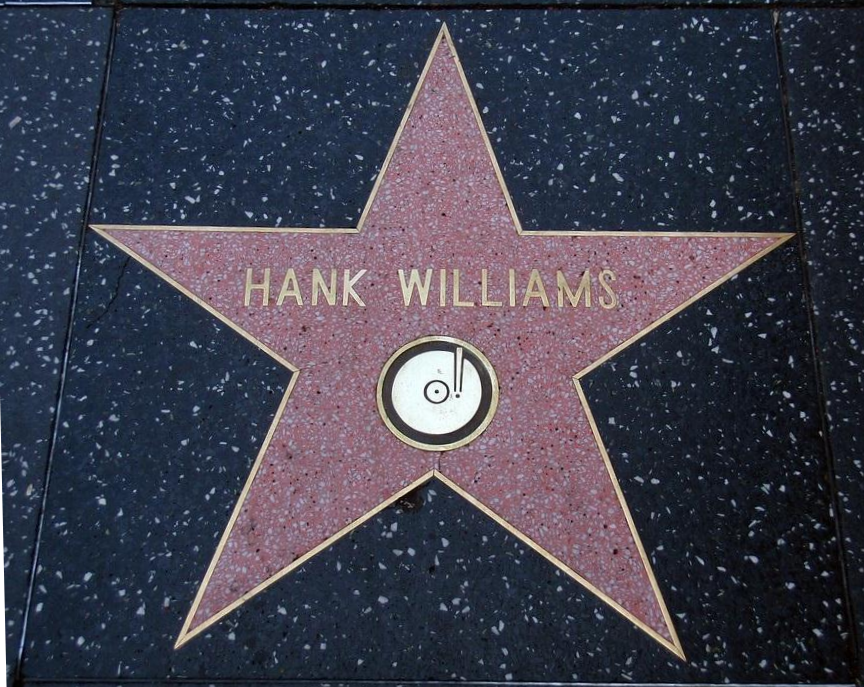
Hank Williams' star at 6400 Hollywood Boulevard, on the Hollywood Walk of Fame

The Country Music Hall of Fame stressed that Williams "set the agenda for contemporary country songcraft" and the "standard by which success is measured in country music". Encyclopædia Britannica considers him "country music's first superstar" and an "immensely talented songwriter and an impassioned vocalist". The Rock and Roll Hall of Fame praised the "straightforward approach" of Williams' songs, which they deemed "brutally honest" and written in the "language of the everyman". To AllMusic, Williams "established the rules for all the country performers who followed him and, in the process, much of popular music".

Entertainment Weekly's TV critic, Ken Tucker, wrote: "despite being a pop-culture titan and rightly dubbed 'father of country music', Hank Williams was possibly the least likable—least warm and sympathetic—figure in modern music. Reeking of self-pity, he wrote and sang some of the greatest woe-is-me music of the century [...] Brimming with an anger that regularly spilled over into misogyny, Williams was also a master of spite." Hank Williams, Jr. wrote in his autobiography: "To hear the tributes, one would think that the entire city [Nashville] took turns kissing Daddy while he was still alive. [...] While he was alive, he was despised and envied; after he died, he was some kind of saint."

Alabama governor Gordon Persons officially proclaimed September 21 "Hank Williams Day". The first celebration, in 1954, featured the unveiling of a monument at the Cramton Bowl that was later placed at the gravesite of Williams. The ceremony featured Ferlin Husky interpreting "I Saw the Light". Williams had 11 number one country hits in his career ("Lovesick Blues", "Long Gone Lonesome Blues", "Why Don't You Love Me", "Moanin' the Blues", "Cold, Cold Heart", "Hey, Good Lookin'", "Jambalaya (On the Bayou)", "I'll Never Get Out of This World Alive", "Kaw-Liga", "Your Cheatin' Heart", and "Take These Chains from My Heart"), as well as many other top 10 hits.

Many artists of the 1950s and 1960s, including Elvis Presley, the Beatles, Bob Dylan, George Jones, Tammy Wynette, Jerry Lee Lewis, Merle Haggard, Gene Vincent, and Ricky Nelson and Conway Twitty were influenced by Williams.

When Downbeat magazine took a poll the year after Williams' death, he was voted the most popular country and Western performer of all time. On February 8, 1960, Williams' star was placed at 6400 Hollywood Boulevard on the Hollywood Walk of Fame. He was inducted into the Country Music Hall of Fame in 1961, and into the Alabama Music Hall of Fame in 1985.

In 1964, the biographical film Your Cheatin' Heart starring George Hamilton as Williams was released. The American Truckers Benevolent Association, a national organization of CB truck drivers, voted "Your Cheatin' Heart" as their favorite record of all time in the fourth annual Truck Drivers' Country Music Awards, in 1978. In 1987, he was inducted into the Rock and Roll Hall of Fame under the category "Early Influence", and he was given the Grammy Lifetime Achievement Award. He was ranked second in CMT's 40 Greatest Men of Country Music in 2003, behind only Johnny Cash who recorded the song "The Night Hank Williams Came To Town". His son, Hank Jr., was ranked on the same list. Canadian singer Sneezy Waters performed as Williams in the stage play Hank Williams: The Show He Never Gave. A 1980 movie adaptation also starring Waters was produced for television.

In 2004, Rolling Stone ranked him number 74 on its list of the 100 Greatest Artists of All Time. In 2005, the BBC documentary series Arena featured an episode on Williams.

In 2010, Williams' 1949 MGM number one hit, "Lovesick Blues", was inducted into the Recording Academy Grammy Hall of Fame. The same year, Hank Williams: The Complete Mother's Best Recordings ...Plus! was honored with a Grammy nomination for Best Historical Album. In 1999, Williams was inducted into the Native American Music Hall of Fame. On April 12, 2010, the Pulitzer Prize Board awarded Williams a posthumous special citation that paid tribute to his "craftsmanship as a songwriter who expressed universal feelings with poignant simplicity and played a pivotal role in transforming country music into a major musical and cultural force in American life".

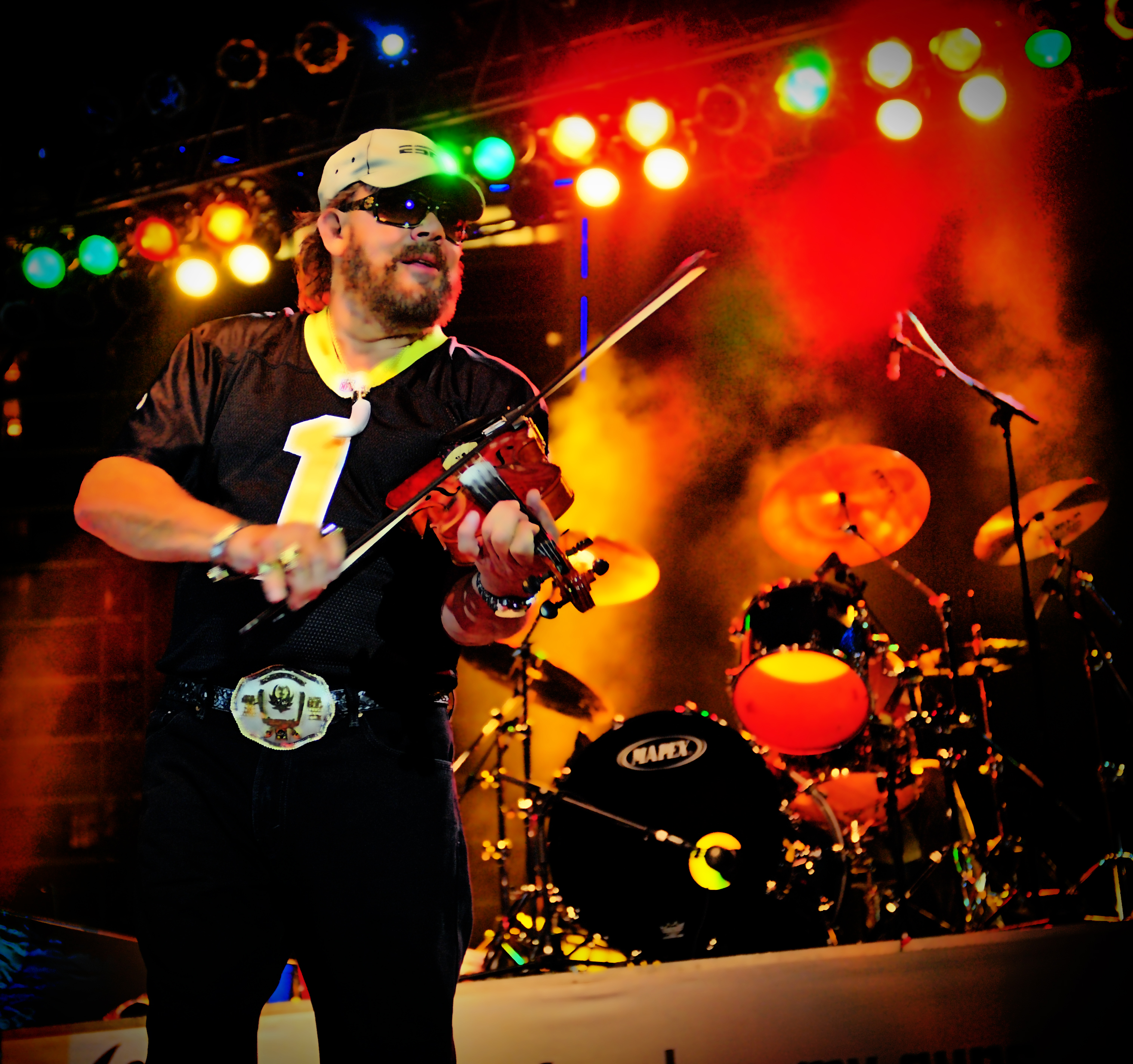
Hank Williams, Jr.

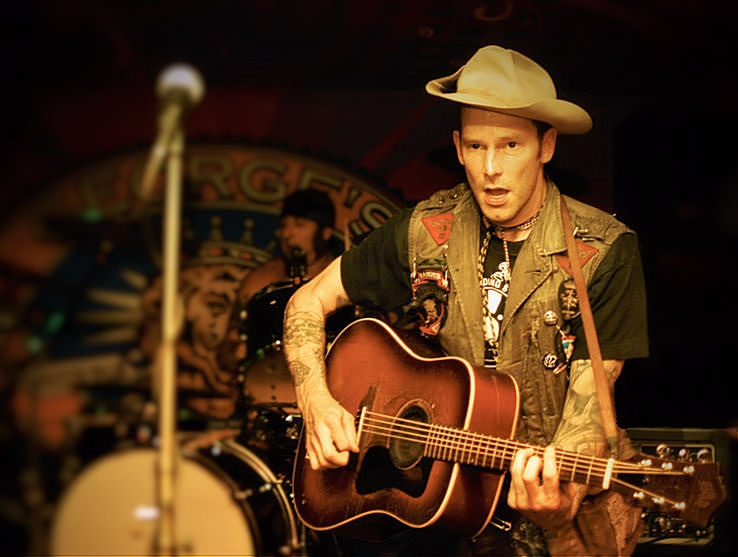
Williams' grandson, Hank Williams III

Several of Williams' descendants became musicians: son Hank Williams Jr., daughter Jett Williams, grandsons Hank Williams III and Sam Williams, and granddaughters Hilary Williams and Holly Williams are also country musicians. In July 2020, his granddaughter Katherine (Hank Jr.'s daughter) died in a car crash at the age of 27. His great-grandson Coleman Finchum, son of Hank Williams III, released his debut single credited to IV and the Strange Band in 2021. Meanwhile, Lewis Fitzgerald's son Ricky billed himself as Hank Williams IV following his father's claim of being Williams' son.

According to reportage in the Los Angeles Times, on his road trips Williams carried a brown leather briefcase containing notebooks in which he wrote musings, lines and verses of song lyrics, as well as jottings on whatever had been handy. After he died, the cache of sixty-six unpublished songs in four notebooks was stored in a fireproof vault at the Nashville offices of his publishing firm, Acuff-Rose Publications. The vault was moved in 2002 to the offices of Sony ATV Music when it acquired Acuff-Rose.

After the 2001 tribute album, "Hank Williams: Timeless" won a Grammy Award for country album of the year, there was heightened interest in similar projects. A&R executive Mary Martin, one of the producers of "Timeless", was consulted about other means of drawing attention to material from the Williams archive. She said that Bob Dylan was given the first opportunity to perform 12 songs for a CD compilation. Dylan approached Williams' granddaughter Holly Williams at a show where he gave her a sheaf of song lyrics he wanted her to read. She later said that although Dylan had said nothing about them at first, she recognized them immediately as her grandfather's work. He then said he had been asked to possibly cut an entire album, or that he might have other artists perform them. She heard nothing more about it for two years until Mary Martin revived the project and she got a phone call from her publishing company saying it was time for her to pick up some samples of the available material.

Consequently, several other musicians got involved in the project, their main task being to create music that suited the lyrics. Dylan chose a song called "The Love That Faded" and fashioned a "honky-tonk waltz through heartache", while Holly Williams combed through the songs and songs fragments and chose one called "Blue Is My Heart", which had only eight lines. She wrote two more and added a bridge. The completed album, named The Lost Notebooks of Hank Williams, included the contributions of Bob Dylan and Holly Williams, as well as recordings by Alan Jackson, Jack White, Jakob Dylan, Lucinda Williams, Norah Jones, Vince Gill, Rodney Crowell, Patty Loveless, Levon Helm, Sheryl Crow, and Merle Haggard. The album was released on October 4, 2011.

Material recorded by Williams, originally intended for radio broadcasts to be played when he was on tour or for its distribution to radio stations nationwide, resurfaced over the years. In 1993, a double-disc set of recordings of Williams for the Health & Happiness Show was released. Broadcast in 1949, the shows were recorded for the promotion of Hadacol. The set was re-released on Hank Williams: The Legend Begins in 2011. The album included the unreleased songs "Fan It" and "Alexander's Ragtime Band", recorded by Williams at age 15; the homemade recordings of him singing "Freight Train Blues", "New San Antonio Rose", "St. Louis Blues" and "Greenback Dollar" at age 18; and a recording for the 1951 March of Dimes.

In May 2014, further radio recordings by Williams were released. These were recordings of The Garden Spot Programs, 1950, a series of publicity segments for plant nursery Naughton Farms originally aired in 1950. The recordings were found by collector George Gimarc at radio station KSIB in Creston, Iowa. Gimarc contacted Williams' daughter Jett, and Colin Escott, a music historian and biographer of Williams. The material was restored and remastered by Michael Graves and released by Omnivore Recordings. The release won a Grammy Award for Best Historical Album.

Williams was portrayed by English actor Tom Hiddleston in the 2016 biopic I Saw the Light, based on Colin Escott's 1994 book Hank Williams: The Biography. In 2023, Rolling Stone ranked Williams at No. 30 on their list of the 200 Greatest Singers of All Time. For the 100th anniversary of his birth, the Hank Williams Museum organized a three-day event in Montgomery that consisted of a series of concerts at the Davis Theater at Troy University and a wreath-laying ceremony at Williams' graveside as the closing event. At the ceremony, September 17, 2023, was proclaimed Hank Williams Day. Meanwhile, in Nashville, the Country Music Hall of Fame and Museum organized a concert featuring artists including Rodney Crowell and Williams' grandchildren Holly, Hillary, and Sam among others. On the anniversary, Billboard commented that Williams was a "breakthrough songwriter" who "remains a mythological figure".

=== Lawsuits over the estate ===
Williams died without leaving a will. In May 1953, Audrey Williams filed a lawsuit in Nashville against MGM Records and Acuff-Rose. The suit demanded that both of the publishing companies continue to pay her half of the royalties from Hank Williams' records. Williams had an agreement giving his first wife half of the royalties, but allegedly there was no clarification that the deal was valid after his death. Because Williams left no will, the disposition of the remaining 50 percent was considered uncertain; those involved included Williams' second wife, Billie Jean Horton and Williams' mother and sister.

At the time of his death, Williams' estate was estimated to be US$13,329.25 (equivalent to $160,400 in 2025) between cash, a cashier's check and his possessions. Lillie Williams considered the legality of Billie Jean's marriage to her son doubtful and she filed for the control of the estate. Billie Jean's lawyer argued that although she married Williams ten days before the finalization of her divorce to Harrison Eshlimar, Louisiana law considered the union legal since she married "in good faith".

Doubtful of the legality of the marriage in Tennessee and Alabama, Lillie Williams and her lawyers made several offers to settle out of court with Billie Jean that reached a final of US$30,000. On August 19, 1953, Billie Jean signed an agreement accepting the money. It required that she stopped making appearances billing herself as "Mrs. Hank Williams", to reveal the location of Williams' Tennessee Walking Horse, and the return of a saddle and three suitcases that belonged to him. With the agreement, Lillie became the legal guardian of the estate on behalf of Hank Williams, Jr.

Soon after giving birth, Bobbie Jett left her and Williams' daughter at Lillie's boardinghouse. Williams' mother expressed to the Montgomery County Department of Public Welfare in January 1953 her intention to adopt the child. While Irene Williams opposed the adoption, Williams' mother was granted the custody over the child she renamed "Cathy". However, upon Lillie's death in 1955, Irene Williams assumed control of the estate. She became thus the legal guardian of Williams' son, while refusing to adopt Cathy. Irene made an attempt to contact the girl's mother, Bobbie Jett, who was at the time married and lived in California. Jett refused to take the child since her husband did not know of the existence of her daughter with Williams. Cathy was then put up for adoption and granted money from the estate of Lillie Williams, to be paid at the age of 21.

In 1963, Wesley Rose contacted Irene regarding the copyright renewals with Acuff-Rose: Rose offered US$25,000 (equivalent to $262,900 in 2025), which Irene accepted to prevent Williams' daughter from making a claim in the future. In 1966, an Alabama judge determined that the guardianship of Williams' estate belonged to Irene Williams, and he confirmed the validity of the copyright renewal deal. Cathy's adoptive parents were contacted by a lawyer, but they refused to contest the ruling of the court. In 1967, Hank Williams, Jr. was declared the only heir to the estate by a second judge. In 1969, the guardianship of the estate was transferred to lawyer Robert Stewart after Irene was arrested and sentenced to a jail term for possession of cocaine by a Texas court. Hank Williams, Jr. reached legal adulthood in 1970.

On October 22, 1975, a federal judge in Atlanta, Georgia, ruled that Billie Jean Horton was Williams' common-law wife, and that part of the copyright renewals of the songs belonged to her. At the age of 21, Cathy learned that Hank Williams was her biological father. In 1981, she found her half-siblings in California, and she learned of a 1952 contract between her biological parents that recognized her as Williams' daughter. She also learned that the court decisions of the 1960s ignored her existence. After a decision by the Supreme Court of Alabama in 1989, she was recognized as an heir of the estate of Williams. She later changed her name to Jett Williams.

==== WSM's Mother's Best Flour ====
In 1951, Williams hosted a 15-minute show for Mother's Best Flour on WSM radio. Due to Williams' tour schedules, some of the shows were previously recorded to be played in his absence. During the mid-1960s, WSM staff photographer Les Leverett rescued acetates that were thrown away by the station. At a later point, the recordings were duplicated. In the 1980s, he shared the acetates with Williams' former band member Jerry Rivers. A decade later, Leverett made a deal with former Drifting Cowboy Hillous Brutum, who did not appear on the recordings, for a commercial release of the copies.

The Legacy Entertainment Group, based in Brentwood, Tennessee, was sued by PolyGram and the heirs of Williams to block the release in 1997. While the original acetates of the shows made their way to the possession of Jett Williams, the lawyer of Legacy Entertainment Group claimed that they belonged to the label and he made an attempt to prevent the heirs of Williams to work on their own release of the recordings. Leverett then told The Tennessean that the original acetates did not belong to Butrum, and that the two of them made a deal to share the profits of the planned Legacy Entertainment Group release. The Universal Music Group, the parent company of Polygram, then claimed ownership of the shows.

In January 2006, the Tennessee Court of Appeals upheld a lower court ruling stating that Williams' heirs—son, Hank Williams Jr, and daughter, Jett Williams—have the sole rights to sell his recordings. In 2008, Time-Life released Unreleased Recordings, a selection of numbers pertaining to the Mother's Best Flour shows. In 2010, the company released a 15-CD box-set containing all of the recordings remastered by sound engineer Joe Palmaccio titled The Complete Mothers' Best Recordings... Plus!.

== Awards ==
Year	Award	Awards	Notes	References
1987	Grammy Lifetime Achievement Award	29th Annual Grammy Awards	Posthumously	
1989	Grammy for Best Country Vocal Collaboration ("There's a Tear in My Beer")	Grammy	with Hank Williams Jr.	
1989	Music Video of the Year ("There's a Tear in My Beer")	CMA	with Hank Williams Jr.	
1989	Vocal Event of the Year ("There's a Tear in My Beer")	CMA	with Hank Williams Jr.	
1990	Video of the Year ("There's a Tear in My Beer")	Academy of Country Music	with Hank Williams Jr.	
1990	Vocal Collaboration of the Year ("There's a Tear in My Beer")	TNN/Music City News	with Hank Williams Jr.	
1990	Video of the Year ("There's a Tear in My Beer")	TNN/Music City News	with Hank Williams Jr.	
2010	Special Awards and Citation for his pivotal role in transforming country music	The Pulitzer Prize	Posthumously	

== Discography ==
=== Studio albums ===
- Hank Williams Sings (1951)
- Moanin' the Blues (1952)

=== Posthumous studio albums ===
- Memorial Album (1953)
- Hank Williams as Luke the Drifter (1953)
- Honky Tonkin' (1954)
- I Saw the Light (1954)
- Ramblin' Man (1955)
- Just Me and My Guitar (1985)
- The Unreleased Recordings (2008)
- The Unreleased Recordings: Gospel Keepsakes (2009)
- The Unreleased Recordings: Revealed (2009)

== Footnotes ==
=== References ===
- AlamHof (2003). "1985 Inductee: Lifework Award for Performing Achievement". The Alabama Music Hall of Fame. Archived from the original on February 13, 2003.
- Andersen, Fred (September 22, 1954). "Crowds Pack Cramton Bowl To Close Hank Williams Days". The Montgomery Advertiser. Vol. 126, no. 227 – via Newspapers.com.
- AP staff (January 24, 2006). "Hank Williams' heirs own rights to recordings". Associated Press.
- AP staff (April 17, 2008). "New exhibit explores Hank Williams' family legacy". Yahoo!. Associated Press. Archived from the original on March 18, 2013.
- Avant, Julia (September 18, 2023). "'Hank Williams Day' declared on his 100th birthday". Gray Media Group, Inc.
- BBC staff (February 5, 2005). "Hank Williams - Honky Tonk Blues". BBC.
- Betts, Stephen L. (September 18, 2018). "Hilary Williams on Triumphant New Album 'My Lucky Scars,' Family Legacy". Rolling Stone.
- Betts, Stephen L. (September 17, 2019). "Flashback: Hear Hank Williams' Recorded Debut With 'Fan It' and 'Alexander's Ragtime Band'". Rolling Stone. Archived from the original on September 20, 2019.
- Billboard staff (January 13, 1951). "The Year's Top Country & Western Artists/The Year's Top Country & Western Records". The Billboard. Vol. 63, no. 2. ISSN 0006-2510 – via Google Books.
- Billboard staff (January 31, 1953a). "In-Pouring of Tributes to Williams Continues". Billboard. Vol. 65, no. 5 – via Google Books.
- Billboard staff (May 23, 1953b). "File Action to Untangle Hank Williams Estate". Billboard. Vol. 65, no. 21. ISSN 0006-2510 – via Google Books.
- Brackett, David (2000). Interpreting popular music. University of California Press. ISBN 978-0-520-22541-1.
- Bragg, Rick (2014). Jerry Lee Lewis: His Own Story. Canongate Books. ISBN 978-0-857-86160-3 – via Archive.org.
- Chiu, David (November 2, 2010). "Hilary Williams Details Her Brush with Death in 'Sign of Life'". theboot.com.
- CMHoF (2023a). "The Kate Smith Evening Hour w/ Hank Williams, Roy Acuff, The Carter Family, The Duke of Paducah, June Carter and Ethel and Albert. [video recording]". Country Music Hall of Fame and Museum Digital Collections.
- CMHoF (2023b). "The Kate Smith Evening Hour, 4/23/1952. [video recording]". Country Music Hall of Fame and Museum Digital Collections.
- CMHoF (2023c). "Hank Williams". The Country Music Hall of Fame and Museum.
- CMT staff (2004). "The Greatest: 40 Greatest Men of Country Music". Country Music Television. Archived from the original on April 14, 2009.
- Cooper, Peter (December 10, 2010). "Country titles enter Grammy Hall of Fame". The Tennessean – via Newspapers.com.
- Dylan, Bob (2004). Chronicles: Volume One. Simon & Schuster. ISBN 978-0-743-22815-2.
- Elliot, Gwendolyn (May 24, 2014). "Newly Discovered Hank! 'The Garden Spot Programs' 1950". American Standard Time. Archived from the original on July 1, 2014.
- Erlewine, Stephen Thomas (2013). "Hank Williams Biography". AllMusic.
- Escott, Colin; Merritt, George; MacEwen, William (2009). Hank Williams: The Biography. Hachette UK. ISBN 978-0-316-07463-6.
- Flippo, Chet (September 15, 2011b). "Nashville Skyline: Johnny Cash and Hank Williams: Got Some More Music Here". Country Music Television. Archived from the original on May 28, 2014.
- George-Warren, Holly; Romanowski, Patricia; Romanowski Bashe, Patricia; Pareles, Jon (2001). The Rolling Stone Encyclopedia of Rock & Roll. Fireside. ISBN 978-0-7432-0120-9.
- Goldsmith, Thomas; Oermann, Robert K. (June 6, 1990). "Rick Van Shelton Tops TNN Awards". New York: Press and Sun-Bulletin. Gannett News Service – via Newspapers.com.
- Guralnick, Peter (1999). Careless Love: The Unmaking of Elvis Presley. Little, Brown and Company. ISBN 978-0-316-33222-4.
- Hagarty, Britt (1983). The Day the World Turned Blue. Talon Books. ISBN 0-88922-214-2 – via Archive.org.
- Haggard, Merle; Carter, Tom (1999). My House of Memories. Cliff Street Books. ISBN 0-06-019308-5 – via Archive.org.
- Harmon, Bryce (August 4, 2021). "IV & The Strange Band Set for Muddy Roots in September as Coleman Carries on Country Legacy". The Murfreesboro Pulse. Archived from the original on August 12, 2021.
- Hemphill, Paul (2005). Lovesick Blues: The Life of Hank Williams. New York: Penguin Group. ISBN 0-670-03414-2.
- Herald-Journal staff (November 9, 1999). "Hank Williams: Native American group Inducts Him". Herald-Journal. Vol. 154, no. 313 – via Google News Archive.
- Hilbourn, Robert (October 28, 2008). "There's Plenty Cookin'". Los Angeles Times.
- Hinckley, David (April 9, 1993). "Saving Brown's Soul". New York Daily News – via Newspapers.com.
- Hughes, Mike (February 13, 2011). "Grammys cover their tracks". Lansing State Journal – via Newspapers.com.
- Hurd, Mary G. (2015). Kris Kristofferson: Country Highwayman. Rowman & Littlefield. ISBN 978-0-8108-8821-0.
- Hyperbolium (October 7, 2010). "Review: Hank Williams – The Complete Mothers' Best Recordings... Plus! (Time Life, 2010)". No Depression. Archived from the original on November 11, 2024.
- Isenhour, Jack (2011). He Stopped Loving Her Today: George Jones, Billy Sherrill, and the Pretty-much Totally True Story of the Making of the Greatest Country Record of All Time. University Press of Mississippi. ISBN 978-1-617-03102-1.
- Keiper, Nicole (May 30, 2010). "Jett Williams Accepts Hank's Pulitzer". The Tennessean – via Newspapers.com.
- Koon, George William (2001) [1983]. Hank Williams, So Lonesome. University of Mississippi press. ISBN 978-1-57806-283-6.
- Kot, Greg (February 22, 1990). "Raitt's revival is confirmed by 4 Grammys". Chicago Tribune. Vol. 143, no. 53 – via Newspapers.com.
- Lewis, Randy (October 2, 2011). "'Lost Notebooks of Hank Williams' finds good company in Bob Dylan". Los Angeles Times. Archived from the original on April 3, 2023.
- Lilly, John (2002). "Hank's Lost Charleston Show". Goldenseal. West Virginia Division of Culture and History. Archived from the original on June 28, 2011.
- Lipsitz, George (1994). Rainbow at Midnight: Labor and Culture in the 1940s. University of Illinois Press. ISBN 978-0-252-06394-7.
- Mansfield, Brian (March 28, 2014). "Hear a newly discovered Hank Williams performance". USA Today.
- Masino, Susan (2011). Family Tradition - Three Generations of Hank Williams. Backbeat Books. ISBN 978-1-617-13107-3.
- McDonough, Jimmy (2010). Tammy Wynette: Tragic Country Queen. Penguin Publishing Group. ISBN 978-1-101-18995-5.
- McPherson, David (2017). The Legendary Horseshoe Tavern: A Complete History. Dundurn. ISBN 978-1-4597-3495-1.
- Michaels, Sean (June 13, 2014). "Tom Hiddleston played country icon Hank Williams in biopic". The Guardian.
- Mulholland, Dave (April 9, 1981). "Sneezy Water finally playing himself". Red Deer Advocate – via Newspapers.com.
- Oermann, Robert K. (December 9, 1987). "Warwick says she'll wait". The Tennessean. Vol. 82, no. 294 – via Newspapers.com.
- Oermann, Robert K.; Goldsmith, Thomas (October 10, 1989). "Strait receives top entertainer". The Tennessean. Vol. 84, no. 248 – via Newspapers.com.
- Olson, Ted (2004). Crossroads: A Southern Culture Annual. Mercer University Press. ISBN 978-0-86554-866-4.
- Outlook staff (August 13, 1954). "Hank Williams Memorial Day Proclaimed Sept. 21 By Persons". The Alexander City Outlook. Vol. 61, no. 64. Alexander City, AL – via Newspapers.com.
- Pasquini, Maria (June 14, 2020). "Country Singer Hank Williams Jr.'s Daughter, 27, Killed in Tennessee Car Crash". People.
- Peterson, Richard A. (1997). Creating country music: fabricating authenticity. University of Chicago Press. ISBN 978-0-226-66284-8.
- Ragogna, Mike (November 11, 2010). "Mother's Best, Hank's Best: A Conversation With Jett Williams and the Students". The Huffington Post. AOL.
- Rankin, Allen (July 15, 1951). "Rankin File". Montgomery Advertiser. Vol. 123, no. 28 – via Newspapers.com.
- Ribowsky, Mark (2016). Hank: The Short Life and Long Country Road of Hank Williams. Liveright Publishing. ISBN 978-1-631-49158-0.
- RockHall (2023). "Hank Williams".
- Roland, Tom (September 16, 2023). "A Century of Hank Williams: Why Senior Still Matters to Country Music". Billboard.
- Rolling Stone staff (January 10, 2014). "100 Greatest Artists of All Time". Rolling Stone.
- Rolling Stone staff (January 1, 2023). "The 200 Greatest Singers of All Time". Rolling Stone.
- Sauter, Danica (September 21, 2023). "Country Music Hall of Fame honors Hank Williams with special concert". Gray Media Group, Inc.
- Schneider, M. (2008). The Long and Winding Road from Blake to the Beatles. Palgrave Macmillan. ISBN 978-0-230-61317-1.
- Selvin, Joel (1990). Ricky Nelson: Idol for a Generation. Contemporary Books. ISBN 0-8092-4187-0 – via Archive.org.
- Stefano, Angela (February 8, 2015). "Hank Williams' 'The Garden Spot Programs' Named Best Historical Album at the 2015 Grammy Awards". The Boot. Taste of Country Network.
- Talbott, Chris (October 7, 2011). "Stars bring Hank's 'Lost Notebooks' to life". New York Daily News. Archived from the original on April 4, 2023.
- Tucker, Ken (September 25, 1998). "The Complete Hank Williams". EW.com. Archived from the original on November 20, 2015.
- Underwood, Ryan (October 5, 2006). "Hank: No original songs in material". The Tennessean. Vol. 102, no. 278 – via Newspapers.com.
- Vanderslice, Paula (September 11, 1978). "Truckers Present Country Music Awards". The Kansas City Times. Vol. 111, no. 3 – via Newspapers.com.
- Vigeland, Tess (May 18, 2014). "Six Decades Later, A Long-Lost Hank Williams Recording Resurfaces". National Public Radio.
- Wallenfeldt, Jeff (2023). "Hank Williams - American Musician". Encyclopædia Britannica.
- Walk of Fame staff (January 28, 2013). "Hank Williams – Hollywood Walk of Fame". Walk of Fame.com. Hollywood Chamber of Commerce.
- Whitburn, Joel (1991). Joel Whitburn Presents Billboard #1s, 1950–1991: A Week-by-week Record of Billboard's #1 Hits. Record Research. ISBN 978-0-89820-080-5.
- WSFA (September 15, 2023). "Multiple weekend events to mark Hank Williams' 100th birthday in Montgomery". Gray Media Group, Inc.
- Whitburn, Joel (2002). Top Country Singles, 1944 to 2001: Chart Data Compiled from Billboard's Country Singles Charts, 1944-2001. Record Research. ISBN 978-0-898-20151-2.
- Williams, Hank (1945). Original Songs of Hank Williams "The Drifting Cow Boy". Leon Johnson.
- Williams, Hilary; Roberts, Mary Beth (2010). Sign of Life: A Story of Family, Tragedy, Music, and Healing. Da Capo Press. ISBN 978-0-306-81913-1.
- Williams, Roger M. (1981). Sing a Sad Song: The Life of Hank Williams. University of Illinois Press. ISBN 978-0-252-00861-0.
- Williams, Hank Jr.; Bane, Michael (1979). Living Proof: An Autobiography. Putnam. ISBN 978-0-399-12369-6.
- Wilson, Jeff (April 26, 1990). "Ex-ironworker Clint Black dominates ACM awards". Vol. 85, no. 101. The Tennessean. Associated Press – via Newspapers.com.
- Wilson, Tony (March 23, 2016). "TSHA | Price, Noble Ray [Ray]". www.tshaonline.org. Archived from the original on August 24, 2020.
- Wilmeth, Thomas L. (2014). ""Pictures from Life's Other Side": Southern Regionalism in Hank Williams's Luke the Drifter Recordings". In Bernstein, Cynthia; Nunnally, Thomas; Sabino, Robin (eds.). Language Variety in the South Revisited. University of Alabama Press. ISBN 978-0-8173-0882-7.
- Young, William H.; Young, Nancy K. (2010). World War II and the Postwar Years in America: A Historical and Cultural Encyclopedia. ABC-CLIO. ISBN 978-0-313-35652-0.
