= Country music in Atlanta =

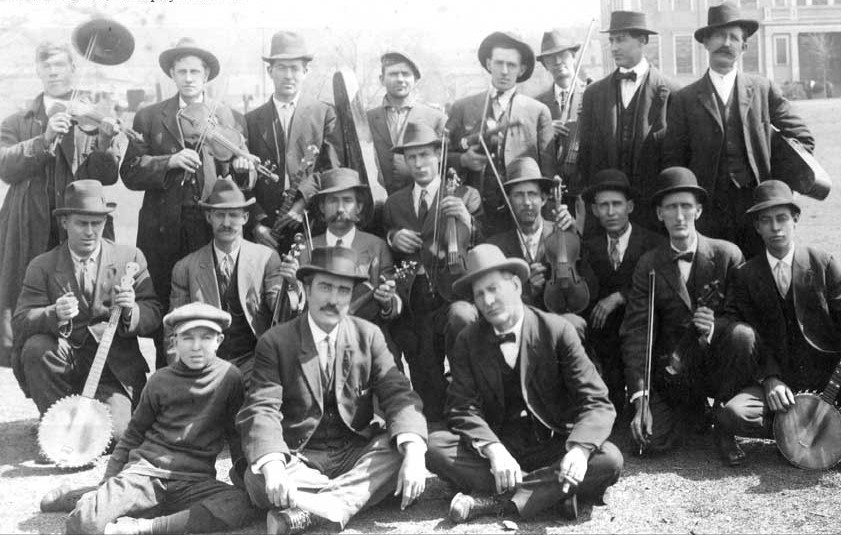
Georgia Old-Time Fiddlers' Convention, 1914

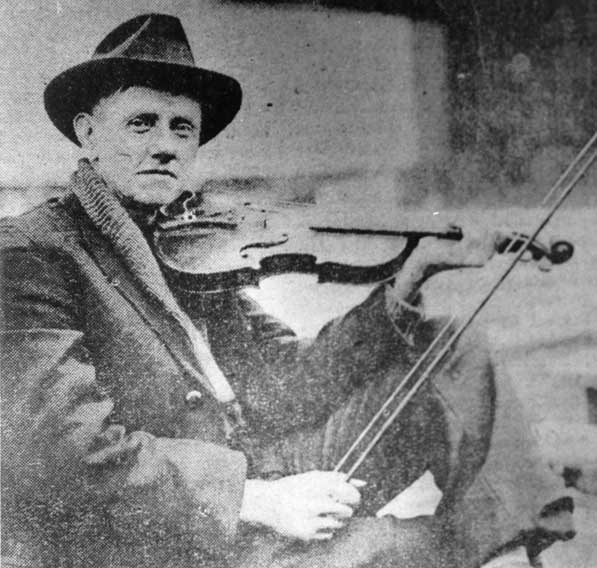
Fiddlin' John Carson

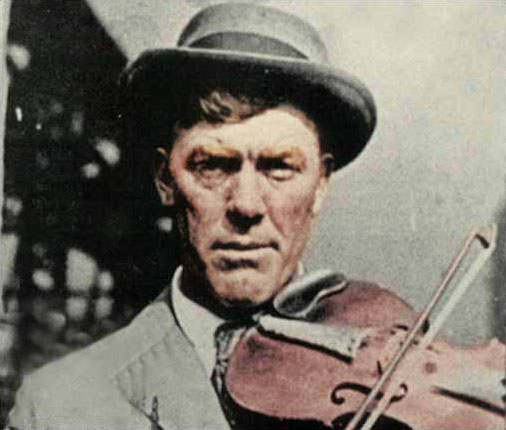
Gid Tanner

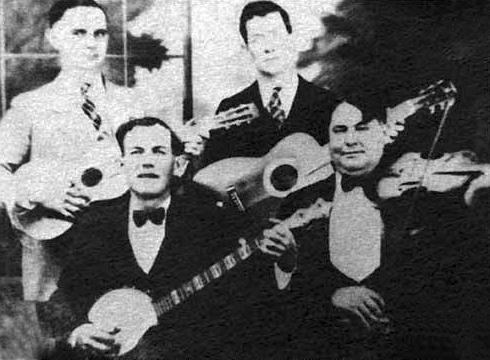
The Georgia Yellow Hammers, 1921

"Cripple Creek", Gid Tanner and the Skillet Lickers

Atlanta played a major role in launching country's earliest recording artists in the early 1920s — many Appalachian people such as Fiddlin' John Carson had come to the city and area to work in its cotton mills and brought their music with them. It would remain a major recording center for two decades and a major performance center for four decades, into the first country music TV shows on local Atlanta stations in the 1950s.

== Origins and influences ==
Much of the audience and many of the artists in Atlanta's country scene lived in the area's three main mill towns: Cabbagetown (Atlanta), a neighborhood in Atlanta itself, Chattahoochee, today within the city's northwestern limits and known as Whittier Mill Village, and Scottdale, just northeast of Decatur.

Atlanta county exhibited influences of Appalachian folk music, black music (notably blues and influences from "Decatur Street" black music scene) and gospel. The first "country blues" recording was likely in 1924, in Atlanta, by Ed Andrews.

Annual Georgia Old-Time Fiddlers' Conventions took place in Atlanta in 1913–1935, a milestone in Atlanta's role as a marketplace for the country genre. Fiddling legend Fiddlin' John Carson placed fourth in the first convention in 1913.

== Radio and television ==
The signal of WSB radio reached far into rural areas and was an important factor in creating country music "stars", similar to the role of WSM in Nashville. WSBs best known country music program was the WSB Barn Dance.

From August 1926 until October 1928, the Sears Agricultural Foundation hosted a radio show, broadcast from the Atlanta Sears tower (now Ponce City Market) called "Dinner Bell R.F.D.". R.F.D. stood for the club "Radio Farmers' Democracy". The show aired on WSB radio between noon and 1 pm three times a week, featuring old-time musicians and string bands

Other than the WSB Barn Dance and a few other exceptions, most of Atlanta's country radio programs stopped broadcasting by the early 1950s; stations broadcast recorded music. Some local country music TV programs were broadcast during the 1950s on WAGA, WLTV, and WSB-TV. Many of the local musicians turned to bluegrass music, started other careers, or pursued their careers in Nashville.

== Decline as a center ==
Gradually, after the 1930s, Nashville became the capital of country music. In addition, Atlanta's aspirations to more "upscale" arts discouraged both the hillbilly band and blues scenes. From the 1940s to the mid-1950s, Atlantans supported a thriving live country music scene, but the city no longer was a major center of music recording. White flight eventually transformed Atlanta into a majority-black city that had largely abandoned Southern cultural hallmarks such as country music.

== Artists 1920s–1950s ==
Notable musicians active in the 1920s–1950s Atlanta scene include:

- Fiddlin' John Carson
- Gid Tanner and his Skillet Lickers
- John Dilleshaw
- Bud Landress
- Georgia Yellow Hammers
- Bill Chitwood
- Charles E. Moody
- Charles Mitchell
- Earl Johnson
- Phil Reeve
- Jimmie Rodgers
- Andrew and Jim Baxter
- Bill Lowery
- Robert Morland Stanley

== Later and current artists ==
Later country artists active in Atlanta included Jerry Reed and Kenny Rogers. Today, Metro Atlanta is home to Alan Jackson, Jason Aldean, Zac Brown Band, Sugarland, Ray Stevens and Travis Tritt.
