= 1928 in country music =

This is a list of notable events in country music that took place in the year 1928.

== Events ==
- "The first edition of Bradley Kincaid's 1928 songbook called My Favorite Mountain Ballads sold more than 100,000 copies;[1]

== Top Hillbilly (Country) Recordings ==
The following songs were extracted from records included in Joel Whitburn's Pop Memories 1890-1954, record sales reported on the "Discography of American Historical Recordings" website, and other sources as specified.Numerical rankings are approximate, they are only used as a frame of reference.

| Rank | Artist | Title | Label | Recorded | Released | Chart Positions |
|---|---|---|---|---|---|---|
| 1 | Jimmie Rodgers | "Blue Yodel No. 1 (T for Texas)" / Away Out On the Mountain" | Victor 21142 | November 30, 1927 | May 1928 | US BB 1928 #20, US #2 for 1 weeks, 11 total weeks, US Hillbilly 1928 #1, 2,000,000 sales |
| 2 | Jimmie Rodgers | "In the Jailhouse Now" / "Ben Dewberry’s Final Run" | Victor 21245 | February 15, 1928 | July 1928 | US BB 1928 #158, US #14 for 1 weeks, 3 total weeks, US Hillbilly 1928 #2, 1,000,000 sales |
| 3 | Jimmie Rodgers | "The Brakeman’s Blues" | Victor 21291 | February 14, 1928 | June 1928 | US BB 1928 #68, US #7 for 1 weeks, 7 total weeks, US Hillbilly 1928 #3, 1,000,000 sales |
| 4 | Carter Family | "Keep on the Sunny Side" | Victor 21434 | May 9, 1928 | July 20, 1928 | US BB 1928 #88, US #9 for 1 weeks, 5 total weeks, US Hillbilly 1928 #4, 141,981 sales, Grammy Hall of Fame 2006 |
| 5 | Hugh Cross and Riley Puckett | "Red River Valley" | Columbia 15206 | November 3, 1927 | January 1928 | US Hillbilly 1928 #5 |
| 6 | Jimmie Rodgers | ""Blue Yodel No. 3 (Evening Sun Yodel)" / "Never No Mo’ Blues" | Victor 21531 | February 15, 1928 | October 1928 | US BB 1928 #108, US #10 for 1 weeks, 4 total weeks, US Hillbilly 1928 #6, 1,000,000 sales |
| 7 | Jimmie Rodgers | "Blue Yodel No. II (My Lovin' Gal Lucille)" | Victor 21291 | February 15, 1928 | June 1928 | US Hillbilly 1928 #7, 1,000,000 sales |
| 8 | Darby and Tarlton | "Birmingham Jail" | Columbia 15212D | November 10, 1927 | March 1928 | US Hillbilly 1928 #8, 200,000 sales |
| 9 | Bradley Kincaid | "Barbara Allen" | Silvertone 5186 | February 27, 1928 | April 5, 1928 | US Hillbilly 1928 #9 |
| 10 | Jimmie Rodgers | "Treasures Untold" / "Mother Was A Lady (If Brother Jack Were Here)" | Victor 21433 | February 14, 1928 | August 3, 1928 | US Hillbilly 1928 #10, 1,000,000 sales |
| 11 | Vernon Dalhart | "Halleluja! I'm a Bum" | Columbia 1488 | July 30, 1928 | November 1928 | US BB 1928 #58, US #6 for 1 week, 5 total weeks, US Hillbilly 1928 #11 |
| 12 | Jimmie Rodgers | "Lullaby Yodel" / "Memphis Yodel" | Victor 21636 | June 12, 1928 | December 1928 | US Hillbilly 1928 #12, 1,000,000 sales |
| 13 | Jimmie Rodgers | "My Little Old Home Down in New Orleans" / "Dear Old Sunny South by the Sea" | Victor 21574 | June 12, 1928 | November 1928 | US Hillbilly 1928 #13, 1,000,000 sales |
| 14 | Georgia Yellow Hammers | "The Picture On the Wall" | Victor 20943 | August 9, 1927 | January 1928 | US Hillbilly 1928 #14, 100,000 sales |
| 15 | Carter Family | "Little Darling Pal of Mine" | Victor 21638 | May 9, 1928 | December 1928 | US BB 1929 #166, US #14 for 1 week, 2 total weeks, US Hillbilly 1928 #15 |
| 16 | Gid Tanner and His Skillet Lickers with Riley Puckett and Clayton McMichen | "Casey Jones" | Columbia 15237 | March 28, 1927 | April 1928 | US BB 1928 #216, US #19 for 1 week, 1 total weeks, US Hillbilly 1928 #16 |
| 17 | Vernon Dalhart and Carson Robison | "A Memory That Time Cannot Erase" | Victor 21094 | July 21, 1927 | March 1928 | US BB 1928 #215, US #19 for 1 week, 1 total weeks, US Hillbilly 1928 #17 |
| 18 | Blind Lemon Jefferson | "See That My Grave Is Kept Clean" | Paramount 12608 | February 26, 1928 | May 4, 1928 | US Hillbilly 1928 #18 |
| 19 | Darby and Tarlton | "Columbus Stockade Blues" | Columbia 15212 | November 10, 1927 | March 1928 | US Hillbilly 1928 #19 |
| 20 | Jules Verne Allen | "The Dying Cowboy" | Victor 23834 | April 21, 1928 | May 4, 1928 | US Hillbilly 1928 #20 |

== Births ==
- March 31 – Lefty Frizzell, honky-tonk singer-songwriter (died 1975).
- April 3 – Don Gibson, singer-songwriter who rose to fame in the late 1950s through late 1970s (died 2003).
- May 3 – Dave Dudley, singer best known for his truck-driving anthems ("Six Days on the Road") (died 2003).
- August 10 – Jimmy Dean, singer-songwriter best known for "Big Bad John" and other 1960s ballads; television host and businessman/founder of eponymously named sausage company (died 2010).
- December 17 – George Lindsey, comedian-actor who played Goober Pyle on television's The Andy Griffith Show and Hee Haw (died 2012).

== Notes ==
1. ^ a b c d e f Bradley Kincaid, Nashville Songwriters Foundation Hall of Fame. Accessed 25 August 2007.
