= List of songs recorded by Hank Williams =

See also Hank Williams discography.

This list contains cover songs recorded by American singer-songwriter Hank Williams and the composer(s). The songs are arranged alphabetically.

== A ==
- Aunt Dinah's Quilting Party (Trad.)

== B ==
- Beneath that Lonely Mound of Clay (Roy Acuff)

== C ==
- Cool Water (Bob Nolan)

== D ==
- The Devil's Train (Cliff Carlisle/Mel Foree)
- Dixie Cannonball (Gene Autry/Vaughan Horton)
- Don't Do It, Darling (Zeke Manners)
- Drifting Too Far from the Shore (Charles Moody)

== F ==
- First Year Blues (Ernest Tubb)
- Fool About You (Ralph C. Hutcheson)

== H ==
- Happy Rovin' Cowboy (Bob Nolan)

== I ==
- I Ain't Gonna Love You Anymore (Ernest Tubb)
- I Cried Again (Autry Inman)
- I'm Free at Last (Ernest Tubb)
- It Just Don't Matter Now (Ernest Tubb)

== J ==
- Jesus Walked that Lonesome Valley (Trad.)

== L ==
- The Last Letter (Rex Griffin)
- Let the Spirit Descend (J.M. Purdom)
- The Little Paper Boy (Johnnie Wright/Jack Anglin)

== M ==
- My Main Trial Is Yet to Come (Pee Wee King/J.L. Frank)

== O ==
- The Old Country Church (John Whitfield Vaughan)
- The Old Home (J.W. Earls)
- Old Shep (Red Foley)

== P ==
- The Prodigal Son (Fred Rose)

== R ==
- Rock My Cradle Once Again (Johnny Bond)
- Rockin' Alone in an Old Rockin' Chair (Bob Miller)
- Rockin' Chair Money (Lonnie Glosson/Bill Carlisle)
- Roly Poly (Fred Rose)

== S ==
- San Antonio Rose (Bob Wills)
- Sundown and Sorrow (Pee Wee King/J.L. Frank)
- Swing Wide Your Gate of Love (Hank Thompson)

== T ==
- Ten Little Numbers (Roy Acuff)
- Tennessee Border (Jimmie Work)
- Tramp on the Street (Grady Cole/Hazel Cole)

== W ==
- Wait For the Light to Shine (Fred Rose)
- When God Dips His Love in My Heart (Cleavant Derricks)
- Wild Side of Life (Arlie Carter/Williams Warren)
- Will the Circle Be Unbroken (Trad.)

== Y ==
- You Caused It All by Telling Lies (Clyde Moody)
