= Rootie Tootie =

Single by Hank Williams
- A-side: "My Sweet Love Ain't Around"
- Published: June 20, 1948 Milene Music, Nashville
- Released: January 1948
- Recorded: November 6, 1947
- Studio: Castle Studio, Nashville
- Genre: Hillbilly, blues
- Length: 2:59
- Label: MGM
- Songwriter: Fred Rose
- Producer: Fred Rose

Hank Williams singles chronology
"On the Banks of the Old Ponchartrain" (1947)	"Rootie Tootie" (1948)	"Honky Tonkin'" (1948)

"Rootie Tootie" is a novelty song written by Fred Rose and recorded by Hank Williams on MGM Records in 1948.

== Background ==
"Rootie Tootie" was released as the A-side to Pee Wee King's smash "Tennessee Waltz" in 1948. Country bandleader Paul Howard released a version that same year. King's success may have inflated Rose's regard for the song's hit potential, and this may be the reason why he pushed it on Williams, although, as Colin Escott speculates, "it's likelier that Hank simply wasn't generating enough material that Rose considered worth releasing." Although Rose, who wrote "Blue Eyes Crying in the Rain", contributed significantly to Williams' sound and development as a songwriter, "Rootie Tootie", much like the earlier "Fly Trouble", was a sophisticated novelty that utterly lacked the wit and charm evident on many of Hank's own funnier compositions like "Mind Your Own Business" and "Howlin' at the Moon". The song was recorded at Castle Studio in Nashville on November 6, 1947 with backing by a group that Rose assembled from two Grand Ole Opry bands: Zeke Turner (lead guitar), Jerry Byrd (steel guitar), and Louis Ennis (rhythm guitar) were from Red Foley's band while Chubby Wise (fiddle) was a member of Bill Monroe's band. Rose may have played piano.
