= Rockin' Chair Money =

Song by Lonnie Glosson, Bill Carlisle

Song by Hank Williams
- Recorded: 1948 or 1949, Shreveport
- Genre: Country, rock and roll, rockabilly
- Length: 2:08
- Songwriter(s): Lonnie Glosson, Bill Carlisle

"Rockin' Chair Money" is a song by Hank Williams. It was composed by Lonnie Glosson and Bill Carlisle.

== Background ==
Williams recorded "Rockin' Chair Money," a song about returning servicemen, while he was working on the Johnny Fair Syrup radio show in Shreveport between August 1948 and May 1949. With its bluesy sound and Hank's repeated declaration, "I like to rock, yeah rock," the song is not far from the rockabilly sound that would become immensely popular in the years ahead. In the 2001 country music documentary Lost Highway, singer Steve Earle asserts, "Hank Williams was the direct precursor of Elvis Presley. He was a white artist influenced by black music and he was an electric performer." Williams always sounded far more comfortable singing blues like "My Bucket's Got a Hole in It" and "Move it on Over" than he did some of the more "uptown" pop novelties producer Fred Rose sometimes had him record, such as "Fly Trouble" and "I'm Satisfied with You." Williams feel for the blues raises the question as to how he would have adapted to rock and roll's arrival and the Nashville sound had he lived; biographer Colin Escott, while allowing that "'Rockin' Chair Money' really rocked", insists that Williams was inalienably country:

"...the new era's most successful artists, like Jim Reeves, Johnny Cash, and Marty Robbins, blurred the line between pop and country, whereas Hank's music always needs to be reinterpreted for the mass audience...Hank was probably too old and too hillbilly, but by dying prematurely, he avoided the indignity of having to answer the question of what he would have done."
