= Roba Stanley =

American country singer and musician from Georgia

- Roba Stanley c.1924 when she was recording old-time music for Okeh Records.

Background information
- Born: February 11, 1908; Dacula, Gwinnett County, Georgia
- Died: June 8, 1986 Gainesville, Alachua County, Florida
- Genres: Old-time music, Country music
- Occupations: musician, homemaker
- Years active: 1920s
- Labels: Okeh Records

Roba Stanley (February 11, 1908 – June 8, 1986) was a country music singer who has been said to be the first woman to record country music. Others have pointed out that Samantha Bumgarner and Eva Davis recorded a session (including solos) three months before Roba recorded. However, she can still be said to be among the earliest of the women who recorded early country music. She was the daughter of Robert Morland Stanley, an old-time fiddler who recorded with her on some of her records.

== Early life ==
Stanley was born as Roba Mary Stanley. Stanley's father was an old-time music fiddler and she was exposed to the music in the home.

Stanley learned to play the guitar and sing in the home and by 1923 (at age 15) went with her father to square dances.

Their home was "a mecca" for early country music near Atlanta, due to her father's prowess as a fiddler. He was the winner of the Georgia Old-Time Fiddlers Convention in 1920. Among the friends he brought to the house was Fiddlin' Johnny Carson, whom Roba remembered playing music with at her house.

== Career ==
=== Music ===
==== Recording ====
Roba recorded for Okeh Records in 1924 and 1925, performing solo and as part of her family's Stanley Trio. She also made records with Bill Patterson.

Of her four July 1924 recordings, two were labeled "Roba Stanley and Bill Patterson" and the other two were "The Stanly Trio". With Patterson she made Devilish Mary and Mr. Chicken. With the trio she made Nelie Grey and Whoa Mule!

She recorded three more in December 1924, All night long (Roba and her father Bob Stanley), Little Frankie (with Bill Patterson), and Railroad Bill (with her father Bob Stanley and with Bill Patterson).

Her last record, in July 1925, was solo. She made Old Maid Blues and Single Life.

==== Performing ====
She performed live on Atlanta's WSB radio for a year. She went on to perform off the air with other Georgia musicians, including Gid Tanner and her father Bob Stanley (himself a fiddler, winner of one of the Georgia Fiddler's Conventions).

==== Family ====
Her music career ended when she married Frank Ellsworth Baldwin and moved to Florida with him. She was no longer near a recording studio and her husband did not like her performing in public, so she gave away her guitar.

== Age when she first recorded ==
=== Either 14 or 16 years old ===
There has been some concern over her age at the time she recorded. One article that mentioned the concern said she was either 14 or 16, and probably was called the latter to avoid child labor laws. Another says that research revealed her to be born in 1910; however the research itself was not identified.

=== Evidence for age 16 at recording time ===
Census records indicate that she would have been 16 at the time she recorded in 1924. From the census, we know she was born between January 17 and April 28 of 1908. That would make her 16 in the July 1924 recording session. Additionally, her family listed her birth date as February 11, 1908, which supports the census data.

==== Census specifics ====
Roba was listed as being two years old in the April 25, 1910 U.S. Census and eleven years old in the January 16, 1920 Census. She had not reached her birthday in the 1920 calendar year when the census was taken. She would have been 12 if the 1920 census was taken in the same month as the previous census.

== See also ==
- Bio of her life, has more about her family and father.
- Web bios of early female country music stars; has picture of Roba Stanley
- Talks about feminist nature of two of Roba's songs

=== Song samples ===
- Roba Stanley playing Single Life on YouTube
- Roba Stanley playing Devilish Mary on YouTube
- Roba Stanley playing Railroad Bill on YouTube
- Stanley Trio playing Whoa Mule! on YouTube
