= (Last Night) I Heard You Crying in Your Sleep =

1947 single by Hank Williams

Single by Hank Williams
- A-side: "Move It on Over"
- Published: July 16, 1947 Acuff-Rose Publications
- Released: June 1947
- Recorded: April 21, 1947
- Studio: Castle Studio, Nashville
- Genre: Country
- Length: 2:42
- Label: MGM
- Songwriter: Hank Williams
- Producer: Fred Rose

Hank Williams singles chronology
"Pan American" (1947)	"(Last Night) I Heard You Crying in Your Sleep" (1947)	"On the Banks of the Old Ponchartrain" (1947)

"(Last Night) I Heard You Crying in Your Sleep" is a song written and recorded by Hank Williams on MGM Records. It was released as the B-side of "Move It on Over" in 1947.

== Background ==
Hank Williams recorded "(Last Night) I Heard You Crying in Your Sleep" at his first MGM recording session after releasing a few sides with Sterling Records. Despite its bouncy tempo, the song contains somber lyrics about a heartbroken man who has come to realize that the woman he loves has never loved him. Making the song even sadder is the forgiving tone of the narrator ("I know you tried your best to love me," "I love you so much I want you happy"), and its simple language is as good an illustration as any of the profound simplicity of Williams' love songs. An embryonic version of the song exists as a lyric sheet in the Alabama Department of Archives and History with words quite dissimilar to the finished recording, suggesting that songwriting wasn't quite the spontaneous act that Williams later made it out to be in interviews; in 1952 he declared to Pathfinder, "People don't write music. It's given to you; you sit there and wait and it comes to you. If a song takes longer than thirty minutes or an hour, I usually throw it away.

Williams recorded the song on April 21, 1947, at Castle Studio in Nashville with Fred Rose producing the session. Williams recorded the song during his first session with MGM on April 21, 1947. The band was composed by part of Red Foley's backing, including Zeke and Zeb Turner (guitar), Brownie Raynolds (bass), Tommy Jackson (fiddle) and Smokey Lohman (steel guitar).

== Cover versions ==
- George Jones recorded the song for United Artists in 1962.
- The song appears on Cal Smith's 1968 LP At Home with Cal Smith.
- Roy Orbison cut the song for his 1970 Williams tribute Hank Williams the Roy Orbison Way.

== Sources ==
- Escott, Colin; Merritt, George; MacEwen, William (1994). Hank Williams: The Biography. New York: Little, Brown.
- Escott, Colin; Merritt, George; MacEwen, William (2004). Hank Williams: The Biography. New York: Little, Brown.
