= The Clayton McMichen Story =

The Clayton McMichen Story is a double LP album by Merle Travis, Mac Wiseman, and Joe Maphis released by CMH Records in 1982. It has not been released on CD.

== Track listing ==
1. "Give the Fiddler a Dram"
2. "In the Pines"
3. "Fire On The Mountain" (Instrumental)
4. "Fifty Years Ago Waltz" (Instrumental)
5. "Hell Broke Loose in Georgia" (Instrumental)
6. "Trouble in Mind'
7. "McMichen's Reel" (Instrumental)
8. "Peach Pickin' Time in Georgia"
9. "Limehouse Blues" (Instrumental)
10. "The Convict and the Rose"
11. "Carroll County Blues" (Instrumental)
12. "House of the Rising Sun"
13. "I'm Looking Over a Four-Leaf Clover"
14. "Dreamy Georgiana Moon"
15. "Waiting for the Robert E. Lee" (Instrumental)
16. "Ida Red"
17. "Rock Jenny Rock" (Instrumental)
18. "Arkansas Traveler" (Instrumental)
19. "Bile 'Em Cabbage Down"; (Medley)
20. "In The Blue Hills of Virginia"
21. "Back to Old Smoky Mountain"
22. "Sweet Georgia Brown" (Instrumental)
23. "They Cut Down The Old Pine Tree"
24. "Darktown Strutters' Ball"
25. "Goodnight Waltz" (Instrumental)
26. "Farewell Blues" (Instrumental)
27. "Sweet Bunch of Daisies"

== Personnel ==
- Merle Travis
- Mac Wiseman
- Joe Maphis

=== Additional musicians ===
- Fiddlin' Red Herron
- Jackson D. Kane
