= Samantha Bumgarner =

American singer-songwriter (1878–1960)

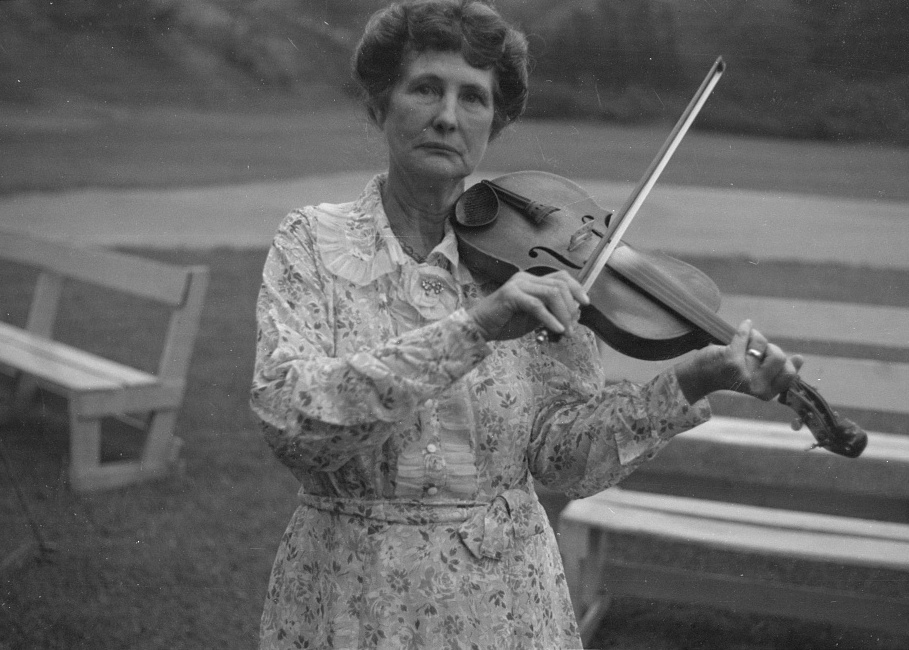
- Samantha Bumgarner in 1937

Background information
- Also known as: Aunt Samantha Bumgarner
- Born: Sarah Samantha Biddix; October 31, 1878
- Origin: Dillsboro, North Carolina, U.S.
- Died: December 24, 1960 (aged 82)
- Genres: Old-time music, country music
- Occupations: country music performer and pioneer
- Instruments: Banjo, fiddle, vocals
- Years active: 1920s – 1960
- Label: Columbia Records
- Formerly of: Eva Davies

"Aunt" Samantha Bumgarner (October 31, 1878 – December 24, 1960), born Sarah Samantha Biddix in Tennessee, was an American early country and folk music performer and singer from Dillsboro, North Carolina. She was the daughter of Hazleton "Haz" Biddix, a locally known fiddler, who bought her her first 5-string banjo. She won much praise for her work with the fiddle and banjo. In 1902, at the age of 23, she married a 40-year-old man named Carson "Carse" Bumgarner, who encouraged her musical career, and bought her a fiddle. In 1924, accompanied by guitarist Eva Davis, she traveled to New York City and recorded about a dozen songs for Columbia Records. The recordings are also notable for being the first use of a 5-string banjo on a recording. She was a yearly headliner at Bascom Lamar Lunsford's Mountain Dance and Folk Festival from 1928 until shortly before her death.

== First female Country recording artist ==
Bumgarner and her friend, Eva Davis, recorded the same year as another female country singer, Roba Stanley. Stanley, whose recordings were made in July, 1924, is believed by many to have been the first female to record country music, but Bumgarner and Davis' recordings were made three months earlier, in April. The pair recorded both in duet and as singer and accompanist and thus qualify for the distinction of having been the first female country solo recording artists.

== Influence on Pete Seeger ==
Folksinger Pete Seeger attended Lunsford's festival in 1935 at the age of 16 in the company of his father, musicologist and composer Charles Seeger, then working for the music division of the WPA, and his stepmother, noted modernist composer Ruth Crawford Seeger, and would have heard Bumgarner perform there. Seeger has credited Bumgarner as his inspiration for wanting to learn the five-string banjo: "He learned (he says) to play the banjo after first hearing one played by a mountain girl named Samantha Bumgarten [sic]—came from the Great Smokies".

== Royal command performance ==
Bumgarner was also among the artists Lunsford assembled to play before George VI and Queen Elizabeth of England in June 1939 at the invitation of President and Mrs. Roosevelt at a White House concert of American music arranged by Charles Seeger and Adrian Dornbush (of the WPA) for the benefit of the first visit by a reigning British monarch and his consort on American soil. Among the other (racially integrated) performers were American concert artists Marian Anderson, Lawrence Tibbett, and Kate Smith, singing classical and light popular music; and folk performers Lily May Ledford and the Coon Creek Girls; Josh White; the Golden Gate Quartet; Sam Queen and the Soco Gap Square Dance Team, who demonstrated clog dancing; and Alan Lomax, singing cowboy songs. According to Judith Tick, Professor of Music at Northeastern University, "It was a singular moment of glory for the Washington WPA folklorists."
