= My Sweet Love Ain't Around =

Single by Hank Williams
- B-side: "Rootie Tootie"
- Released: January 1948
- Recorded: November 7, 1947
- Studio: Castle Studio, Nashville
- Genre: Hillbilly
- Length: 2:42
- Label: MGM
- Songwriter: Hank Williams
- Producer: Fred Rose

Hank Williams singles chronology
"On the Banks of the Old Ponchartrain" (1947)	"My Sweet Love Ain't Around" (1948)	"Honky Tonkin'" (1948)

"My Sweet Love Ain't Around" is a song written and performed by Hank Williams. It was his third single on MGM Records released in January 1948.

== Background ==
"My Sweet Love Ain't Around" was recorded at Castle Studio in Nashville with Fred Rose producing and backing from Jerry Byrd (steel guitar), Robert "Chubby" Wise (fiddle), Zeke Turner (lead guitar), probably Louis Innis (bass) and either Owen Bradley or Rose on piano. After the underwhelming performance of "On the Banks of the Old Ponchartrain," "My Sweet Love Ain't Around" returned to the harder sound that had made "Move It On Over" a #4 hit the year before. With Jerry Byrd's steel guitar mimicking a train whistle and William's lazy, blues-drenched vocal, the song may have been too raw for country audiences at the time, which may explain why the single failed to chart. In light of his later monumental chart success, many people forget that Williams had recorded seven singles by January 1948, of which six were flops. As biographer Colin Escott notes, "At this point, Hank was no more than a sidebar to Fred Rose's activities and was far from MGM's best-selling artist." By October 1947, MGM had snagged the enormously popular Bob Wills from Columbia and enjoyed its first big hit with "Life Gits Tee-Jus, Don't It" by singer Carson Robison. Williams' career would explode with the release of "Lovesick Blues" in January 1949.

== Cover versions ==
- Nita, Rita & Ruby released a version of the song on RCA Victor in 1957.
- The song appears on Johnny Paycheck's 1970 album Again.
- The Osbourne Brothers recorded the song at Bradley's Barn in Nashville in 1970.
- Songwriter Joe Sun covered the song on his 1980 album Livin' on Honky Tonk Time.
- Suzy Bogguss scored a minor hit with the song in 1989, which rose to #38 on the Billboard country singles chart.
- Johnny Colla and the Lucky Devils recorded a version of the song for the LP Black with Flames.
- Rhonda Vincent included the song on her 2008 album The Storm Still Rages.

== Bibliography ==
- Escott, Colin (2004). Hank Williams: The Biography. Back Bay. ISBN 0-316-73497-7.
