= Dan Hornsby =

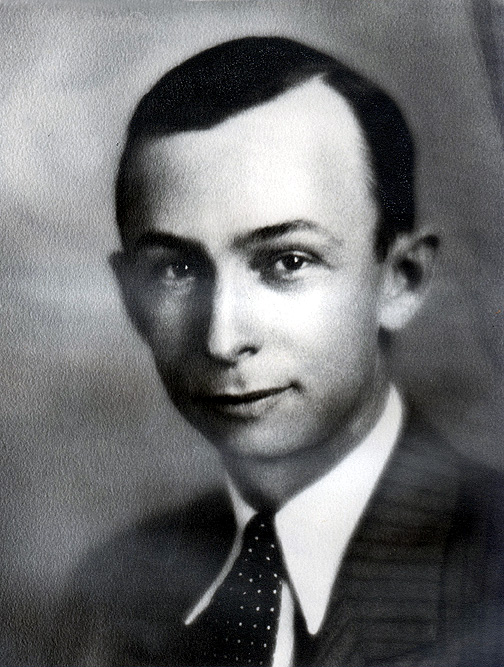

Background information
- Born: Isaac Daniel Hornsby; February 1, 1900
- Origin: Atlanta, Georgia, US
- Died: May 18, 1951 (aged 51)
- Genres: Folk music, pop music, jazz, Americana music
- Occupations: Singer, songwriter, producer, musician, recording artist
- Instruments: vocals, trumpet, piano
- Years active: 1919–1951
- Labels: Columbia Records, RCA Victor, Bluebird Records

Isaac Daniel (Dan) Hornsby (February 18, 1900 – May 18, 1951) was an American singer-songwriter, musician, recording artist, producer and arranger, studio engineer, band leader, artists and repertoire (A&R) man with Columbia Records, and radio personality.

Hornsby began performing in the 1920s, and over the years, he formed or backed up bands. He often played multiple roles, from an idea for a song, to when it was produced. His songs were a combination of country and folk music. Hornsby acquired country, folk, and blues talent for Columbia Records and MGM, including Bessie Smith and other talents.

The Grammy Museum had a display of his music archive artifacts for Columbia Records in 2013. Hornsby was inducted into the Atlanta Music Hall of Fame in 1986.

== Personal life ==
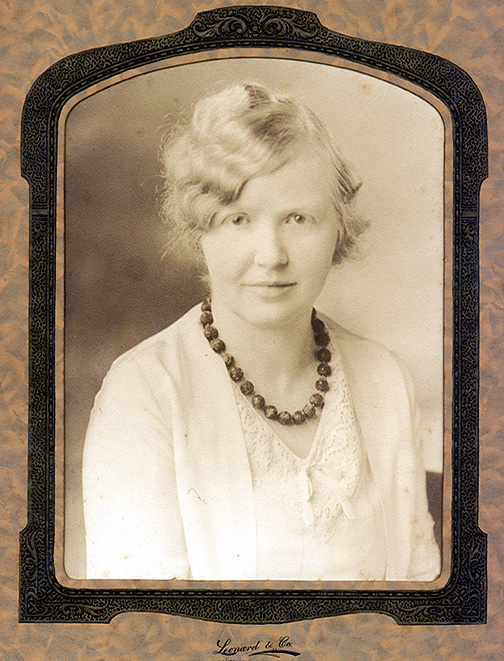
Wife Louise (Wise) Hornsby

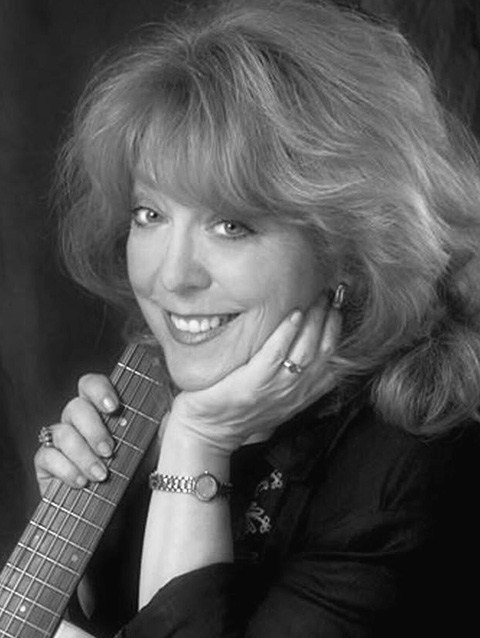
Granddaughter Nikki Hornsby, a singer-songwriter

Hornsby was born in Georgia on February 18, 1900. His parents were Annie May Todd Hornsby, born in Kentucky, and Joe T. Hornsby, a painter born in Georgia. His father was a contractor and a part-time Baptist minister. Dan Hornsby spent most of his childhood in Atlanta, GA where he lived in 1910 with his parents, Annie Mae Todd & J. Todd, and two younger sisters, Helen and Cynthia. Joseph T Hornsby, Dan & Louise Hornsby’s was the first born of five children of two sons and three daughters. Joe registered for the draft at age 18 and was a student at North Georgia College. He lived in Fulton County, Georgia, at that time.

At age 19, Dan Hornsby worked as a painter with the W.E. Browne Decorating Co. in Columbus, Georgia, with his father and while painting a hotel, met Louise Wise of Little Rock, Arkansas. She sang and danced. They married about 1920 and had three daughters Dorothy, Helen, Silvia and two sons, Joseph T. and Robert S. Their children were Joseph, Dorothy, Helen, Robert, and Silvia. Hornsby died on May 18, 1951, and was buried at the Crest Lawn Cemetery in Upper Westside, Atlanta.

Nikki Hornsby, Dan Hornsby's granddaughter, became a singer and songwriter in the late 20th and early 21st century. She inherited her grandfather's music archive after her parents died and has worked to keep the memory of his music career alive.

== Career ==
=== Bands ===
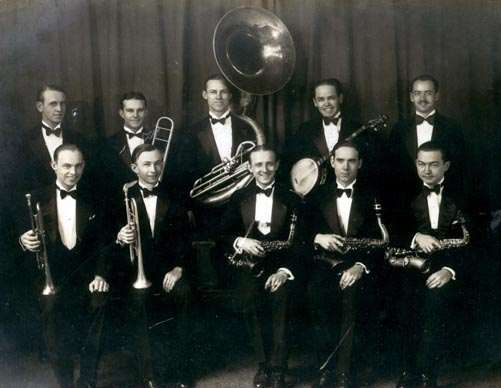
Dan Hornsby (front row, second from left with a trumpet) with one of his bands

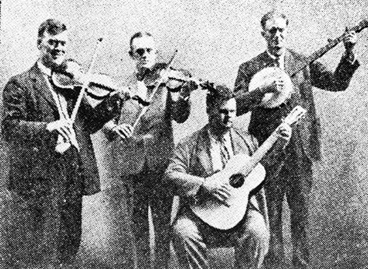
Skillet Lickers (without Hornsby)

Hornsby entered show business in the 1920s. He formed the Dan Hornsby Quartet with Perry Bechtel, Taylor Flanagan, and Sterling Melvin.

Of the performers:

- Perry Bechtel played the bariton, banjo, and guitar
- Taylor Flanagan was a high tenor and played the piano
- Dan Hornsby, the lead singer, played trumpet and piano, and was the arranger
- Sterling Melvin played the bass guitar, guitar, and was a tenor banjoist

The quartet became a trio in 1927 when Perry Bechtel left the group. The trio played on a WSB (AM) program in Atlanta.

Besides his quartet and trio, Hornsby created or joined Skillet Lickers, Young Brothers Tennessee Band, Georgia Organ Grinders, Lowe Stokes and His North Georgians, and Bamby Baker Boys.

=== Radio ===
In 1922, Atlanta's WSM Radio went on air, making Bamby Baker Boys, Hornsby's group, the first commercial performers on the station. In the 1920s and 1930s, Hornsby was a radio announcer in Atlanta. He had his own program, sponsored by a bakery, on Atlanta's WSM Radio station where he acquired the nickname "Cheerful Dan". He sang in two octaves and had speaking roles under the name "Tom Dorsey" for drama shows. He also often wrote the scripts and performed for recordings with Gid Tanner and the Skillet-Lickers for Columbia Records.

=== Talent scout ===
Hornsby began his career as a talent scout with Columbia Records, RCA Victor Records and then worked for MGM, during which he looked for talented performers — often in the country and blues genres — and signed those he chose to a contract. Hornsby discovered Hank Williams for MGM and Gid Tanner and the Skillet Lickers, Riley Puckett, Bessie Smith, Clarence Ashley, and Charlie Poole at Columbia. In 1931, he recruited Alton and Rabon Delmore (later known as Delmore Brothers) for Columbia Records.

He recruited African American musicians, including Robert Hicks, a blues singer who played the guitar. Hornsby, who met Hicks at a barbecue restaurant, named him "Barbecue Bob" and used an image of Hicks in a chef's apron and hat, by a barbecue pit of roasting pork for marketing. He had white bands and performers in recording sessions with Black musicians, which was highly unusual at that time in the South.

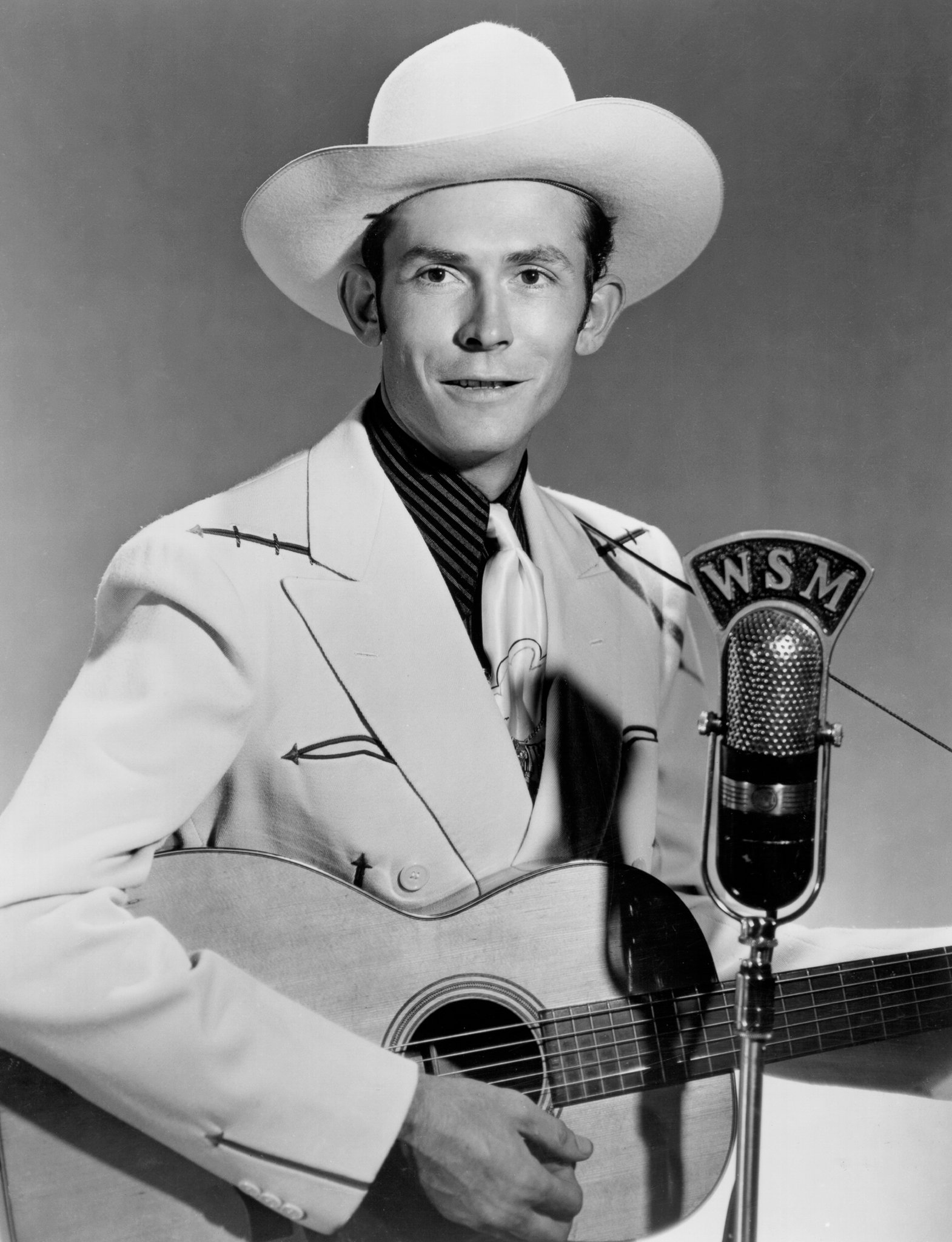
Williams in a promotional photo for WSM in 1951

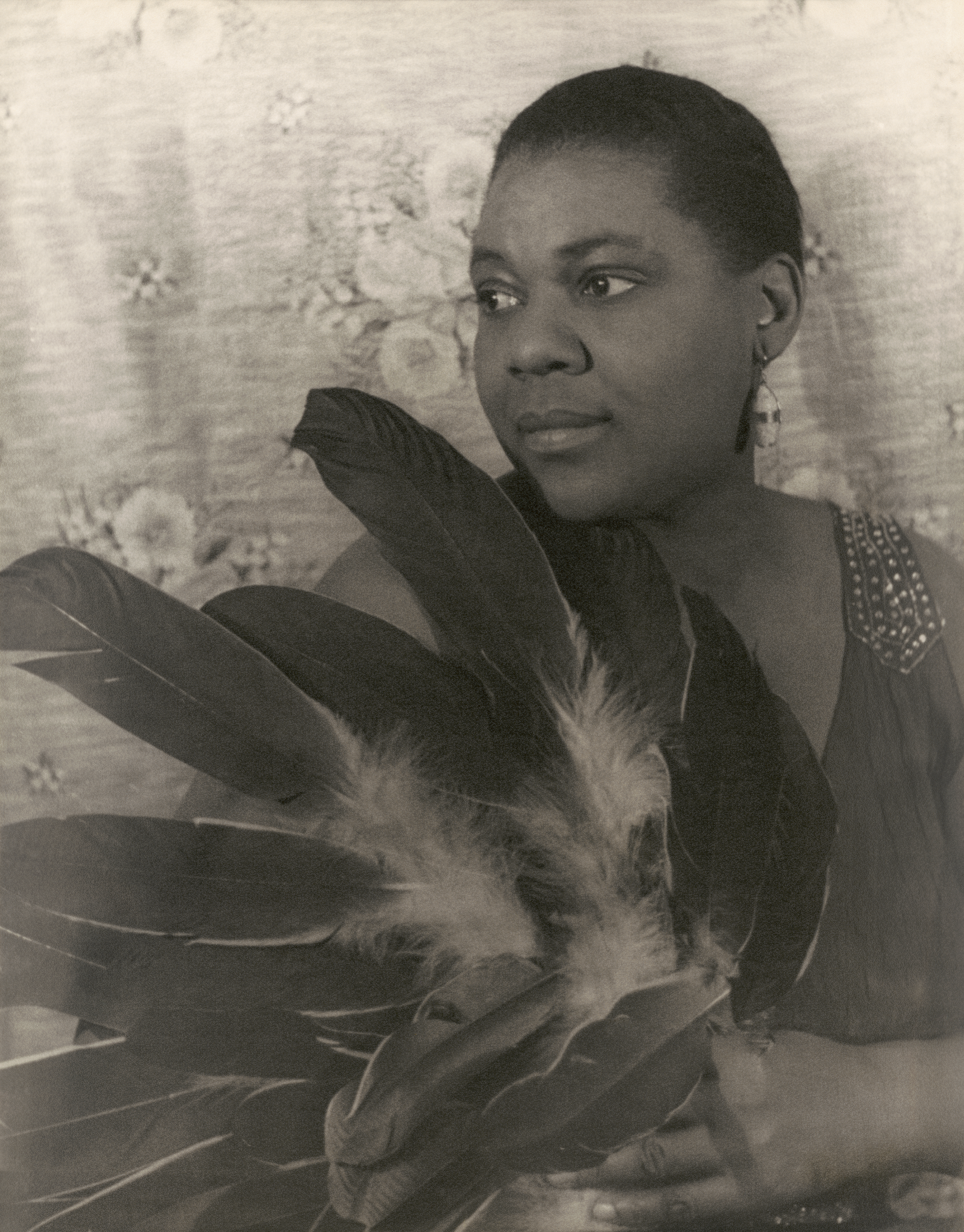
Bessie Smith by Carl Van Vechten in 1936

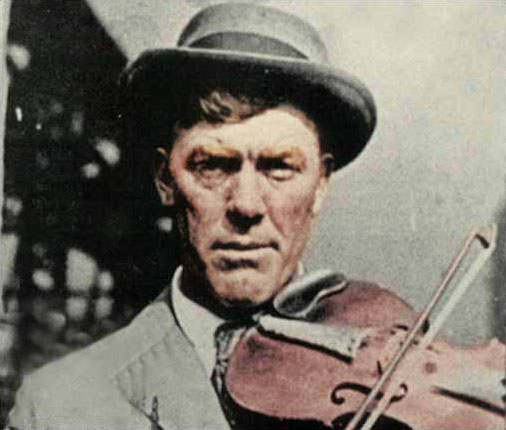
Gid Tanner

=== Production ===
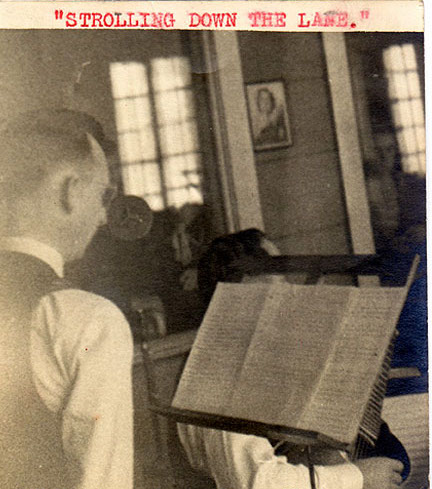
Dan Hornsby during recording "Strolling Down The Lane"

Columbia selected a producer to record his songs, like "Dear Old Girl" and "O, Susanna". By 1931, he and his band recorded more than two dozen sides. "Arkansas Traveler" was first recorded with Hornsby's voice.

He then produced his recordings, such as "Take Me Out To The Ballgame", "I Want A Girl", and "You Are My Sunshine", for its inaugural recording. He produced recordings with the Young Brothers Tennessee Band, like "Won't You Come Home Bill Bailey" and "Little Brown Jug".

=== Songwriter ===
He wrote, sang, and produced a few original folk songs for Columbia.

On August 28, 1928, a building collapsed in Shelby, North Carolina, killing six people and injuring twice as many. Hornsby composed a song, "Shelby Disaster":

A sample of bluegrass music
The Shelby Disaster by Dan Hornsby, recorded in 1928

Let the tears of fond remembrance,
flow gently, full and free;
Let all who read my story,
extend their sympathy.

But the whispering hope of ages,
with true ambition shod,
leaps forth with reconstruction,
for hope is part of God.

And remember there's a city,
whose streets should be our goal,
where buildings never crumble,
that city of the soul.

— Dan Hornsby, The Shelby Disaster

=== Great Depression and radio ===
The Great Depression (1929–1939) affected the phonographic industry, and Hornsby lost his job with Columbia Records despite selling over 9,000 copies of "The Shelby Disaster". Together with Clayton McMichen, Hornsby wrote History in a few words published in 1931 by Shapiro, Bernstein & Co.

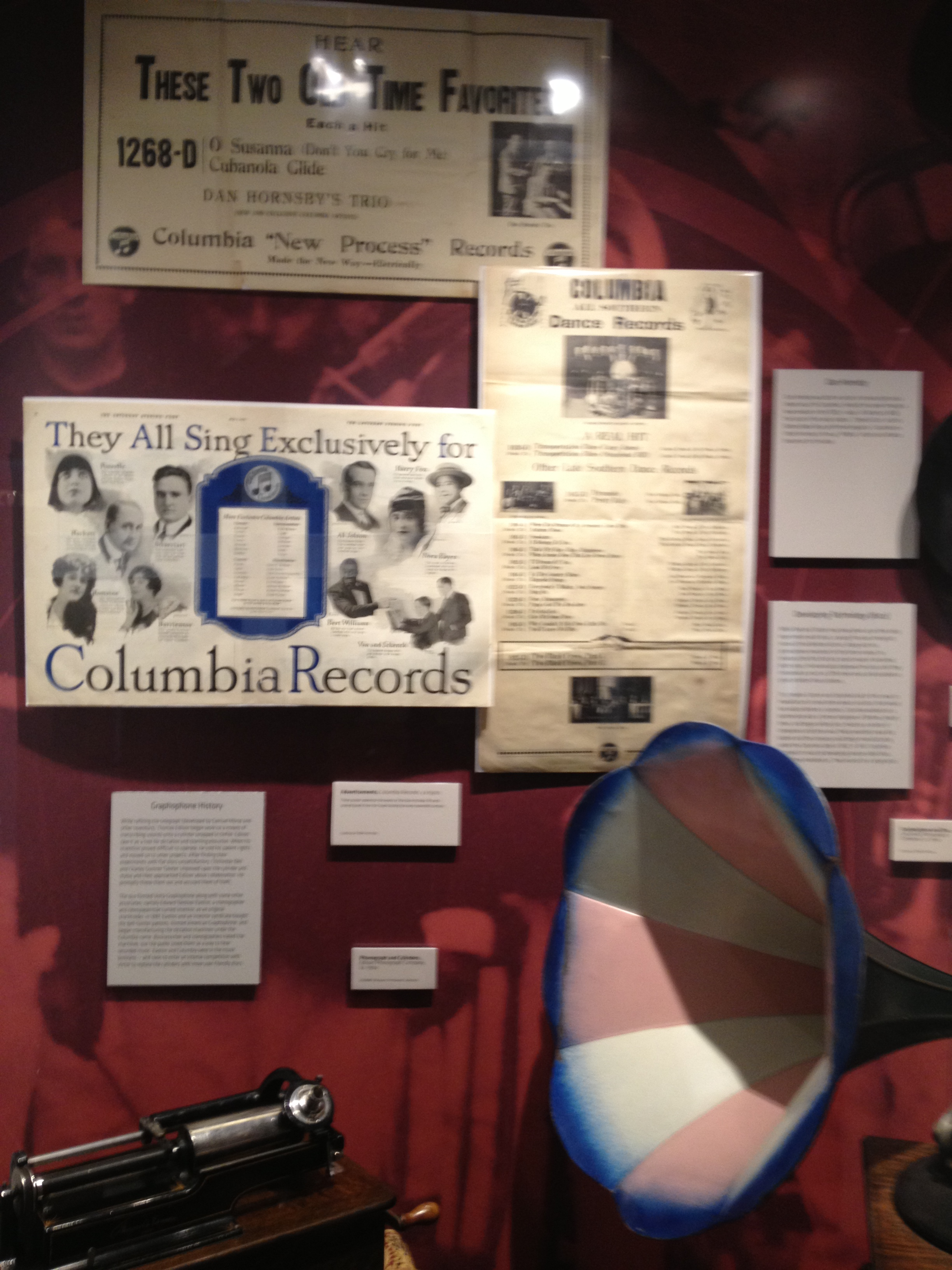
Exhibition at The Grammy Museum related to Dan Hornsby Trio

He returned to radio and worked with several stations, including WGST and WSB, where he was a scriptwriter, announcer, and entertainer until his death. For Bluebird Records, he played Uncle Ned in a series of children's bedtime stories and sang with the big band of Perry Bechtel. In 1934, he joined RCA Victor Records.

== Award and honor ==
In 1986, Hornsby was inducted into the Atlanta Country Music Hall of Fame, joining some of his friends and associates: Gid Tanner, Clayton McMichen, and Riley Puckett.

In 2013, Hornsby was given a display for the Columbia Records display in the Grammy Museum in Los Angeles, California, for one year. Other artifacts were donated by his granddaughter, Nikki Hornsby, including records, posters, and recordings of Bessie Smith, Harry James, Frank Sinatra, and others.

== Discography ==
Year	Songs
1927	Are You From Dixie; Bill Bailey, Won't You Please Come Home; Dear Old Girl (Columbia 15769D); The Banquet In Misery Hall; Cubanola Glide (Columbia 1268D); Oh! Susanna (Columbia 1268D)
1928	On Mobile Bay (Columbia 15276D); I Want A Girl (Just Like The Girl That Married Dear Old Dad) (Columbia 15276D); Goodbye Alexander; Oceana Roll; The Shelby Disaster (Columbia 15321D); The Story Of C.S. Barnes (Columbia 15321D); She Was Bred In Old Kentucky (Columbia 15381D); Can't Yo' Hear Me Callin' Caroline (Columbia 15381D); Ho! By Jingo (Columbia 1637D); Has Anybody Here Seen Kelly? (Columbia 1637D); Just A Baby's Prayer At Twilight (Columbia 15578D); I'm Sorry I Made You Cry (Columbia 15578D); Arkansas Traveler Part 1 (with Clayton McMichen, Columbia 15253D); Arkansas Traveler Part 2 (with Clayton McMichen, Columbia 15253D)
1929	Take Me Out To The Ball Game: The Vamp; Take Me Out To The Ball Game (Columbia 15444D); Hinky Dinky Dee (Columbia 15444D); Wynkyn, Blynkyn and Nod (Victor BS-037380); All Alone; Lovin' Henry; Old Weary Blues; Four Thousand Years Ago; A Night In A Blind Tiger
1930	History In A Few Words (Columbia 15628D); The Lunatic's Lullaby (Columbia 15628D)
1931	Katinka; A Sailor's Sweetheart (Columbia 15771D); Three Blind Mice (Columbia 15771D); So This Is Venice
1934	Whoa, Mule, Whoa; Hinkey-Dinkey-Dee; Prosperity And Politics; Practice Night With The Skillet Lickers
1939	I Found You Among The Roses
unknown	Little Brown Jug; You Are My Sunshine; Strolling Down The Lane
