= Nikki Hornsby =

American singer, songwriter, and guitarist

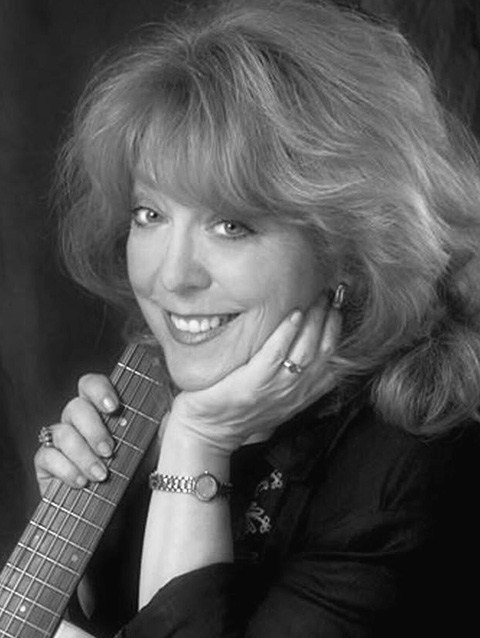
- Hornsby in 2007

Background information
- Born: Nikki Hornsby; Long Beach, California, U.S.
- Genres: Pop, Americana, country, Christian music and Blues
- Instruments: Vocals, guitar
- Years active: 1970s–present
- Label: CJP-NHRecords
- Website: www.cjp-nhrecords.com

Nikki Hornsby is an American musician who has been active in the pop, Americana, country, and blues genres as a songwriter, singer, and guitarist. From Long Beach, California, Hornsby grew up in Fairfax County of Northern Virginia. She is the granddaughter of Dan Hornsby, who was a songwriter, musician, recording artist, talent scout, engineer and producer for Columbia Records RCA Victor. Hornsby's family association with songwriter Jimmy Van Heusen influenced her when young. Hornsby inherited her grandfather's archive of early Americana music and has worked to document his legacy, including his discovery of many songwriter-singers, such as Bessie Smith, for Columbia Records.

== Career ==
=== Before 2000 ===
Hornsby played gigs in the eastern US while a college student. She moved back to California in the 1970s and began playing regularly, but did not begin to record until the late 1980s, when she founded her own label, CJP-NH Records (Common Justice Productions - NHRecords). Her song "Shoe String and a Prayer" began to get radio play in America as well as Europe; the tune charted on the Cash Box Top 100 and hit the independent country charts in America. She was named Female Singer of the Year in Scandinavia in 1988. By 1991, for larger concert venue purposes she formed Nikki Hornsby and the Rangers.

In the early 1990s, she routinely sang at concerts on the pier in Redondo Beach and the Alpine Village in Torrance, California. In August 1991, she drew the largest crowd of the summer at Redondo Beach's summer Concert in the Park series. Nikki Hornsby and the Rangers played the Concert in the Park series again in August 1993 and July 1994.

In the 1980s, she recorded as a solo singer-songwriter musician with Steve Duncan, JayDee Maness, and John Jorgenson from The Desert Rose Band; Jack Daniels (Hwy 101 Band); and guitarist Al Bruno.

=== 2000–2006 ===
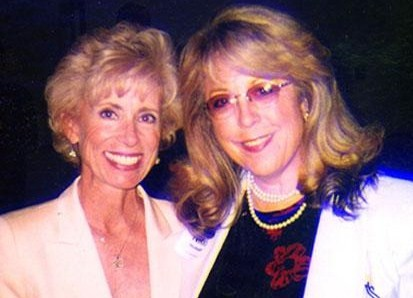
Laura Schlessinger (left) with Hornsby in 2009. Schlessinger used Hornsby's song "Hot Talkin' Big Shot" for several years as theme music.

"Hot Talkin' Big Shot"

In August 2001, Nikki Hornsby sang at the Cliffie Stone Memorial Jamboree in Santa Clarita, California. Hornsby also acted as a judge for a number of California country music competitions and as a judge of talent for the Colgate Talent Contests. "Hot Talkin' Big Shot" is an original song by Hornsby.

=== 2006–present ===
Hornsby appeared on the Spanish TV channel IB3 in April 2006. She also performed on commercial radio telecasts in Palma. In 2009, CJP-NHRecords released Just Wait Instrumentally (the instrumental version of the 2006 album Just Wait). In 2014, CJP-NHRecords released Hornsby's original song "Just Lovin' You" that was covered by the singer Zita Sabon as "Ich Liebe Dich" (translated into German). In 2011 Hornsby was nominated for Billboard's Women in Music award.

== Discography ==
year	album or song title	comments
1986	Let Me Take You on a Dream	(NH#1088)
1986	One Way Ticket to a Heart Break	(NH#3088)
1987	Hungry For Love	(NH#4088)
1987	Hot Talking Big Shot	(NH#2088)
1988	Shoestring & A Prayer	(NH#5089)
1989	Career Video Highlights	VHS / DVD
1989	Wake Me Up	(NH#6089)
1996	Nikki Hornsby Live Performance	VHS / DVD
1999	Cassette of Originals	CJP-NHRecords, NH# 1007C
2001	Reaching Out	(NH#2007) CJP-NHRecords
2005	Previous Releases	(NH#7121) also known as Original Releases CJP-NHRecords
2006	Just Wait	(NH#7106) CJP-NHRecords
2009	Just Wait Instrumentally	(NH#7119) CJP-NHRecords
2014	Ich Liebe Dich	(NH#701320144) CJP-NHRecords Nikki Hornsby music and lyrics translated into German covered by Zita Sabon.
2014	Just Lovin' You	(NH#70132014) CJP-NHRecords
2014	Music Is The Only Thing	(NH#702020141) CJP-NHRecords
2020	Red Roses On The Floor	(NH#9163200202) CJP-NHRecords
2020	Yo Tengo Un Amor	(NH#9163200203) CJP-NHRecords
