= Fly Trouble =

Single by Hank Williams
- A-side: "On the Banks of the Old Ponchartrain"
- Released: September 1947
- Recorded: August 4, 1947
- Studio: Castle Studio, Nashville
- Genre: Country, Western swing
- Length: 2:42
- Label: MGM
- Songwriters: Fred Rose, Bunny Biggs, Honey Wilds
- Producer: Fred Rose

Hank Williams singles chronology
"Move It On Over" (1947)	"Fly Trouble" (1947)	""My Sweet Love Ain't Around""

Fly Trouble is a novelty song written by Fred Rose, Bunny Biggs, and Honey Wilds and recorded by country singer Hank Williams.

== Background ==
By September 1947, Hank Williams and Fred Rose had released five singles, the last of which, "Move It On Over," became the singer's first smash, peaking at #4. The follow-up single, which was released while "Move It on Over" was still climbing the charts, was "On the Banks of the Old Ponchartrain," with "Fly Trouble" as the B-side. The single was a disappointment, failing to chart, and moved away from what was arguably Williams' biggest strength: his songwriting. The words to the A-side were written by a woman named Ramona Vincent, who sent the poem to Hank, while "Fly Trouble" was written by Rose and the blackface comedy team of Bunny Biggs and Honey Wilds, better known as Jamup and Honey. Although Williams would go on to record several humorous songs which showcased his dry sense of humor, "Fly Trouble" is an anomaly in his canon, as country music historian Colin Escott observes: "It seemed to signal Rose's intention of easing Hank uptown. From the hokey lyrics to Sammy Pruett's jazzy guitar breaks, the entire production was precisely what Hank's music was not about, and it was precisely what white sandyland farmers who had just moved to town did not what to hear."

The song was recorded at Castle Studio in Nashville on August 4, 1947, with Rose producing. Williams was backed by Tommy Jackson (fiddle), Hermon Herron (steel guitar), Sammy Pruett (lead guitar), Slim Thomas (rhythm guitar), and Lum York (bass).

== Bibliography ==
- Escott, Colin (2004). Hank Williams: The Biography. Back Bay. ISBN 0-316-73497-7.
