= Slim Bryant =

American country musician (1908–2010)

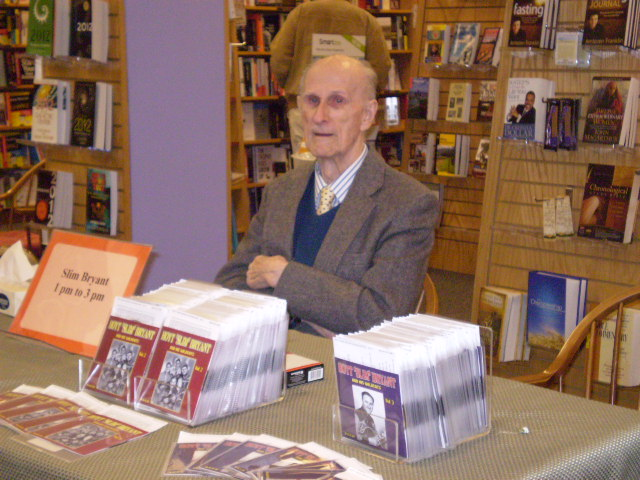
- Bryant in 2009

Background information
- Born: Thomas Hoyt Bryant; December 7, 1908; Atlanta, Georgia, U.S.
- Died: May 28, 2010 (aged 101) Dormont, Pennsylvania, U.S.
- Genres: Country, pop-jazz, polka
- Occupations: Singer-songwriter, musician, radio personality
- Years active: 1928–2010
- Formerly of: The Georgia Wildcats

Thomas Hoyt Bryant (December 7, 1908 – May 28, 2010) known professionally as Slim Bryant, was an American country music singer-songwriter and guitarist born in Atlanta, Georgia. He was one of the last country musician's who had started recording in the 1920s. He started playing guitar in his youth and he would become billed on radio as "The Boy With A Thousand Fingers" and by the 1930s became famous as member of The Georgia Wildcats, his crisp modern guitar-playing would be admired by virtuoso Les Paul.

As a songwriter, he composed some 200 songs, but was best known for writing commercial radio jingles for large corporations, like US Steel, Alcoa, Westinghouse, Chevrolet and for Iron City Beer for the Pittsburgh Brewing Company.

== Biography ==
Bryant was born in Atlanta, Georgia in December 1908, to Posey Milton Bryant and his wife Auroria and was one of six siblings, Atlanta was a popular outpost for what would become known as country music and played host to the annual Old Time Fiddlers Convention.

Bryant by 1928, aged 20, had made his first recording "Ain't She Sweet", as a member of a stringed band called "The Harmony Boys". Bryant then spend nine years with Georgian fiddler Clayton McMichen, a former member of the Skillet-Lickers, as part of his group "The Georgia Wildcats", another popular and influential string band, the group originally based in Atlanta, left the city, and started performing on several radio stations throughout Cincinnati, Chicago, St. Louis, Louisville and others, most of the band had separated from McMichen and moved to Pittsburgh in 1940 where he and the Georgia Wildcats became regulars on radio KDKA's new early morning program Farm Hour, and there were very few Hillbilly performers heard as widely throughout the South-Eastern and Mid-Western States in the 1930s.

He had worked at the station previously in 1931 with McMichen and in 1937 with his own group the Georgia Wildcats after parting ways with McMichen. The Wildcats became a Pittsburgh institution during World War II; and in 1949 performed on the first television program to air in that city, a musical variety show broadcast live on WDTV from Syria Mosque in Pittsburgh's Oakland section. WDTV became KDKA in January 1955. Having worked with several female singers, they added vocalist Nancy Fingal to add a pop music flavor. There were no other guests. Fingal was, Slim says, "A very talented girl, singin' Frank Sinatra tunes, that kind of stuff."

He was the last surviving musician to have recorded with the legendary country singer Jimmie Rodgers, who died in 1933. In 1932, Rodgers recorded Bryant's song "Mother, the Queen of My Heart", with Bryant accompanying him on guitar. Rodgers not only gave him writing credit, but had them list Bryant's name first, which is something many big stars refused to do. He also recorded nine other songs with Rodgers. With his back-up group, the Wildcats, he wrote and recorded such novelty songs during his career as "Eeny Meeny Dixie Deeny", the closest he ever came to having a hit on the Billboard charts.

== Personal life ==
Bryant resided in the Pittsburgh suburb of Dormont, Pennsylvania. He was the subject of an extensive profile by Rich Kienzle in the January–February 2004 issue of No Depression.

Slim and his wife Mary Jane Bryant had a son, Thomas Bryant.
