= Gid Tanner =

American musician (1885–1960)

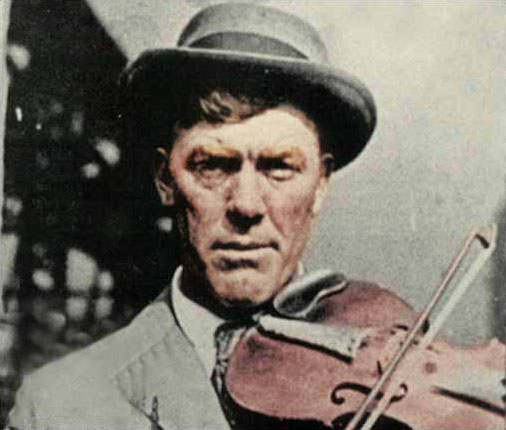

Background information
- Born: James Gideon Tanner; June 6, 1885
- Origin: Thomas Bridge, near Monroe, Georgia, United States
- Died: May 13, 1960 (aged 74) Dacula, Georgia, United States
- Genres: Old-time music
- Occupations: Country musician, chicken farmer
- Instruments: Fiddle, banjo
- Years active: 1899-1957

James Gideon Tanner (June 6, 1885 – May 13, 1960) was an American musician and old-time fiddler, regarding as one of the earliest stars and pioneers of country music. His band, the Skillet Lickers, was one of the most innovative and influential string bands of the 1920s and 1930s. Its most notable members were Clayton McMichen (fiddle and vocal), Dan Hornsby (vocals), Riley Puckett (guitar and vocal) and Robert Lee Sweat (guitar).

== Biography ==
Tanner was born in Thomas Bridge, near Monroe, Georgia. He made a living as a chicken farmer for most of his life. He learned to play the fiddle at the age of 14 and quickly established a reputation as one of the finest musicians in Georgia. Early on, he participated in several fiddle conventions together with his rival Fiddlin' John Carson; what one of them did not win, the other would. Tanner reportedly had a repertoire of more than 2000 songs.

Tanner and Puckett traveled to New York City in March 1924 to make the first of a series of duet recordings for Columbia Records, establishing the Skillet Lickers as Columbia's first recorded southern rural artist. In 1926, the Skillet Lickers were formed around Tanner as a studio band. The first recording made with the Skillet Lickers was "Hand Me Down My Walking Cane," recorded in Atlanta on April 17, 1926, when the country music scene in Atlanta rivaled Nashville's. It was released by Columbia on a 78-rpm disc, backed with "Watermelon on the Vine". In the next eight years, the group recorded more than 100 songs. In 1934, Tanner and Puckett re-formed the Skillet Lickers, and several of their recordings were released by Bluebird Records. Tanner stopped making records in 1934 but continued performing into his seventies. At the age of 71, Tanner won his last first-place trophy. He died in Dacula, Georgia in 1960.

== Legacy and influence ==
Many of the songs recorded by the Skillet Lickers were traditional American fiddle tunes that remain popular with bluegrass and country musicians to this day. Among them are "Alabama Jubilee", "Shortnin' Bread", "Old Joe Clark", "John Henry", "Bully of the Town", "Bile Them Cabbage Down", "Cotton-Eyed Joe", "Fly Around My Pretty Little Miss", "Soldier's Joy", "Bonaparte's Retreat", "Leather Breeches", "Four Cent Cotton", "Knoxville Girl", and their biggest seller, "Down Yonder". It sold over one million copies, and was awarded a gold disc by the RIAA. Their comedy recordings, called "rural drama records", including the saga "A Corn Licker Still in Georgia" (Issued over the course of 7 records) and "A Fiddler's Convention in Georgia", were equally popular.

Gid Tanner & the Skillet Lickers were inducted into the Georgia Music Hall of Fame in 1988. Following Tanner's death in 1960, his grandson Phil Tanner and great-grandson Russ Tanner continued performing as the Skillet Lickers. Phil Tanner hosts an open jam session on Friday nights in a refurbished chicken house on his father's old farm in Dacula, Georgia. Levi Lowrey, Gid's great-great grandson also continues in his footsteps as a country music artist, songwriting for Zac Brown and featured on Southern Ground Records in a multi-album record deal.

Bob Dylan wrote and performed a version of Gid Tanner's "Down on Tanner's Farm", retitled and reset as "New York Town". It can be heard in Martin Scorsese's 2005 documentary on Dylan, No Direction Home.

"Cripple Creek", Gid Tanner and the Skillet Lickers

== Discography ==
=== 78 rpm ===
In various prewar lineups Tanner recorded singles for Columbia and later rival labels Bluebird, Victor, His Master's Voice (India), Regal (England), Regal Zonophone (Australia), Montgomery Ward, and Vocalion. Postwar, at least one Tanner 45-rpm reissue single is known on RCA Victor.

=== Postwar recordings ===
- Gid Tanner, Gordon Tanner, Phil Tanner's Skillet Lickers, Skillet Licker Music 1955–1991: The Tanner Legacy, Global Village CD-310 (1997)

=== Reissued recordings ===
- Gid Tanner & the Skillet Lickers, RCA Victor EPA-5069 (1958)
- Gid Tanner & His Skillet Lickers, Folk Song Society of Minnesota 15001-D (1962)
- The Skillet Lickers: Vol. 1, County 506 (196?)
- The Skillet Lickers: Vol. 2, County 526 (1973)
- Gid Tanner & His Skillet Lickers, Hear These New Southern Fiddle and Guitar Records Rounder 1005 (1973)
- Gid Tanner & His Skillet Lickers. The Kickapoo Medicine Show, Rounder 1023 (197?)
- Gid Tanner & the Skillet Lickers, Vetco LP-107 (197?)
- The Skillet Lickers, A Day at the Country Fair: Early Country Comedy, Old Homestead OHCS-145 (1985)
- Gid Tanner & His Skillet Lickers, Early Classic String Bands Vol. 3, Old Homestead OHCS-193 (1990)
- Gid Tanner & His Skillet Lickers, A Corn Licker Still in Georgia, Voyager VRLP-303 (197?), reissued as VRCD-303 (1997)
- The Skillet Lickers, Old-Time Fiddle Tunes and Songs from North Georgia, County CD-3509 (1996)
- The Skillet Lickers, Complete Recorded Works in Chronological Order Volume 1: 1926–1927, Document DOCD-8056 (2000)
- The Skillet Lickers, Complete Recorded Works in Chronological Order Volume 2: 1927–1928, Document DOCD-8057 (2000)
- The Skillet Lickers, Complete Recorded Works in Chronological Order Volume 3: 1928–1929, Document DOCD-8058 (2000)
- The Skillet Lickers, Complete Recorded Works in Chronological Order Volume 4: 1929–1930, Document DOCD-8059 (2000)
- The Skillet Lickers, Complete Recorded Works in Chronological Order Volume 5: 1930–1934, Document DOCD-8060 (2000)
- The Skillet Lickers, Complete Recorded Works in Chronological Order Volume 6: 1934, Document DOCD-8061 (2000)
- Gid Tanner and the Skillet Lickers, Old Timey's Favorite Band (4 CDs), JSP JSPCD 77155 (2012)
