= Skillet Lickers =

American old-time music Georgia band (1926–1931)

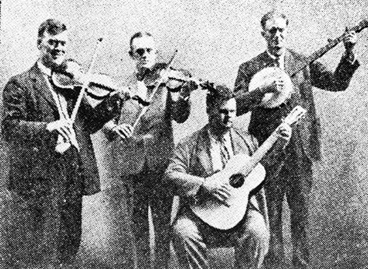
The Skillet Lickers

The Skillet Lickers were an old-time band from Georgia, United States.

When Gid Tanner teamed up with blind guitarist Riley Puckett and signed to Columbia in 1924, they created the label's earliest so-called "hillbilly" recording. Gid Tanner formed The Skillet Lickers in 1926. The first line-up was Gid Tanner, Riley Puckett, Clayton McMichen and Fate Norris. Between 1926 and 1931 they recorded 88 sides for Columbia, with 82 of them commercially issued. Later members were Lowe Stokes, Bert Layne, Hoke Rice, Arthur Tanner and Hoyt "Slim" Bryant. Their best-selling single was "Down Yonder", a hillbilly breakdown, in 1934 on RCA Victor. They disbanded in 1931, but reformed for occasional recordings after a couple of years with a changing line-up. "Back Up and Push" was another well-known recording. The Skillet Lickers, together with fellow North Georgians Fiddlin' John Carson and the Georgia Yellow Hammers, made Atlanta and North Georgia an early center of old-time string band music, especially the hard-driving fiddle-based style employed by each of these performers.

== Individual members ==
Clayton McMichen (1900–1970) was the lead fiddler. He was known as "Mac". At the age of 11 he learned to play the fiddle from his uncle and father. Two years later, in 1913, his family moved to Atlanta, Georgia where Mac made his living as an automobile mechanic. In 1918 he formed a band called "The Hometown Boys" consisting of himself and Charles Whitten on fiddles, Boss Hawkins and Mike Whitten on guitars and Ezra "Ted" Hawkins on mandolin. The Hometown Boys made their radio debut on September 18, 1922. In 1931, he performed with the "Georgia Wildcats" on their first recording session for Columbia Records. He was National Fiddling Champion from 1934 to 1949. Mac made his last recordings in 1945, although he continued to perform until 1955 when he retired. His most notable composition was "Peach Pickin' Time in Georgia", later recorded by Jimmie Rodgers in 1932. By the time the folk revival was under way in the late 1950s, his irritation with being asked to play old-fashioned material was unconcealed. At the Newport Festival he spoke out on stage of his disdain for the Skillet Lickers. However, the recordings he made with that band are the only ones of his in print. In the early 1930s. the band occasionally toured without Gid Tanner, and without Puckett, with McMichen in charge instead. On these occasions Bert Layne would black-up for on stage comedy.

Fate Norris, (Singleton Lafayette Norris) of Dalton, Georgia played the banjo, and harmonica. He lived in Resaca, Georgia. He had previously performed as a one-man band and had made a device with strings and levers which he played with his feet. Norris made some recordings under his own name and was only occasionally a member of the band. By 1931 he appears to have disappeared from the line-up, to be replaced by Gid on banjo. He later died on stage in Subligna, Georgia on November 11, 1944.

Lowe Stokes (Marcus Lowell Stokes 1898–1983), who played the fiddle, was born in Elijay, Georgia. A superb fiddler, considered McMichen's equal and one of the finest recorded fiddlers of the time, he won many fiddle championships in the region. Stokes lost his right hand to a shotgun blast in the late 1920s, in the midst of the Skillet Lickers' popularity. He eventually began fiddling again using a prosthetic attachment to hold his bow, and he can be heard playing on some later Skillet Licker records in this manner. Later, Stokes moved to Chouteau, Oklahoma where he died.

Bert Layne (fiddle), brother-in-law of McMichen, played occasionally. His fiddle had a lower sound than Tanner or McMichen, but the combination of three fiddles marks out the group from almost everyone else at the time. On the group's later records, the three-fiddle lineup was usually composed of McMichen, Layne, and Lowe Stokes, playing tightly in unison or in harmony, while Gid Tanner switched to banjo. Arthur Tanner (brother of Gid) played banjo and guitar.

Riley Puckett recorded solo for Victor and Decca in the 1930s and early 1940s. He also belonged to a trio called Bert Layne and his Mountaineers. After 1931 the group occasionally consisted of Riley Puckett on guitar, Gordon Tanner on fiddle, Edward "Ted" Hawkins on mandolin and record producer Dan Hornsby on vocals. There are recordings by a group called Arthur Tanner and the Cornshuckers, which may have contained Gid Tanner.

The virtuosity of Puckett tended to pull in a different direction from that of Mac. The band recorded in two long recording sessions per year, from 1926 to 1931. Few members of the group were full-time professional musicians. Clayton McMichen was an auto mechanic. McMichen was a welder. Tanner was a chicken farmer. Riley Puckett toured as a musician with his own tent show. His technical virtuosity marks him out as one of the best guitarists of the 1920s and early 1930s.

== Legacy ==
While many bands are celebrated for their innovations, the Skillet Lickers are celebrated for embracing and popularizing a style of American music rarely heard outside of private performances or get togethers like picnics or in places outside of the South. They were a wellspring of such music and greatly aided in popularizing this type of fiddle driven, rural based music. They played many instrumentals, ballads, pop songs and comedy sketches, such as "A Corn Licker Still in Georgia". This was a set of 14 sketches with a running gag that people in authority wanted to stamp out illegal stills and after-hours fiddle-playing, but secretly wanted to drink the liquor, and hear the tunes. They even depicted a real-life minister of the church drinking the moonshine in a sketch. The New Lost City Ramblers, a revival old-time group from the early 1960s, were fans of the Skillet Lickers. Tanner's son, Gordon Tanner, went on to lead a group called the Junior Skillet Lickers. Tanner's grandson, Phil, led Skillet Lickers II.

== Discography ==
78s:

- As the Skillet Lickers, and as various lineups including many of the same personnel, the band recorded singles on Columbia and affiliated labels, Bluebird, Victor, His Master's Voice (India), Regal (England), Regal Zonophone (Australia), Montgomery Ward, and Vocalion labels. Postwar, at least one 45 rpm reissue single is known on RCA Victor.

Postwar recordings:

- Gid Tanner; Gordon Tanner; Phil Tanner's Skillet Lickers : Skillet Licker Music 1955-1991: The Tanner Legacy - Global Village CD-310 (1997)

Reissued material also appears on:

- Gid Tanner & the Skillet Lickers : eponymous - RCA Victor EPA-5069 (1958)
- Gid Tanner & His Skillet Lickers : eponymous - Folk Song Society of Minnesota 15001-D (1962)
- The Skillet Lickers : Vol. 1 - County 506 (196?)
- The Skillet Lickers : Vol. 2 - County 526 (1973)
- Gid Tanner & His Skillet Lickers : Hear These New Southern Fiddle and Guitar Records - Rounder 1005 (1973)
- Gid Tanner & His Skillet Lickers : The Kickapoo Medicine Show - Rounder 1023 (197?)
- Gid Tanner & the Skillet Lickers : eponymous - Vetco LP-107 (197?)
- The Skillet Lickers : A Day At the Country Fair: Early Country Comedy - Old Homestead OHCS-145 (1985)
- Gid Tanner & His Skillet Lickers : Early Classic String Bands Vol. 3 - Old Homestead OHCS-193 (1990)
- The Skillet Lickers : Old-Time Fiddle Tunes and Songs from North Georgia / County CD-3509 (1996)
- Gid Tanner & His Skillet Lickers : A Corn Licker Still in Georgia - Voyager VRLP-303 (197?), reissued as VRCD-303 (1997)
- The Skillet Lickers : Complete Recorded Works In Chronological Order Volume 1: 1926-1927 - Document DOCD-8056 (2000)
- The Skillet Lickers : Complete Recorded Works In Chronological Order Volume 2: 1927-1928 - Document DOCD-8057 (2000)
- The Skillet Lickers : Complete Recorded Works In Chronological Order Volume 3: 1928-1929 - Document DOCD-8058 (2000)
- The Skillet Lickers : Complete Recorded Works In Chronological Order Volume 4: 1929-1930 - Document DOCD-8059 (2000)
- The Skillet Lickers : Complete Recorded Works In Chronological Order Volume 5: 1930-1934 - Document DOCD-8060 (2000)
- The Skillet Lickers : Complete Recorded Works In Chronological Order Volume 6: 1934 - Document DOCD-8061 (2000)
- Gid Tanner And The Skillet Lickers: Old Timey's Favorite Band on 4 CDs - JSP JSPCD 77155 - 2012

Anthologies:

- "Can't You Hear Me Callin' Bluegrass: 80 Years of American Music" (2004)
- "Good For What Ails You 1926 - 1937" (2006)
- "Serenade in the Mountains" (2006)

== Bibliography ==
- Stars of Country Music, (University of Illinois Press, 1975), ISBN 978-0252005275
