= Curryville, Georgia =

Unincorporated community in Georgia, United States

Coordinates: 34°26′37″N 85°04′44″W

Curryville (formerly called Little Row) is an unincorporated community in Gordon County, in the U.S. state of Georgia.

== History ==
An early variant name was "Little Row", after a local Native American leader. A post office was established as Little Row in 1883, renamed Curryville in 1895, and discontinued in 1955. The present name honors David W. Curry, a local pharmacist.

== Notable people ==
Roland Hayes, a composer and celebrated lyric tenor, was born in Curryville.
