= Andrew and Jim Baxter =

Father and son band

Andrew Baxter (March 1869 – April 15, 1955), African-American fiddle player, and Jim Baxter (James Baxter; January 18, 1898 – June 11, 1950), African-American-Cherokee singer and guitar player, were a father and son fiddle and guitar duet from Gordon County, Georgia, who recorded in the 1920s.

The Georgia Yellow Hammers and the Baxters traveled to Charlotte, North Carolina, to record for Victor in the summer of 1927. Because of the Jim Crow laws, the Baxters had to ride several cars behind the Yellow Hammers on the train ride to Charlotte. In Charlotte, each group recorded their individual sessions, with one exception: Andrew Baxter played fiddle on "G Rag" with the Yellow Hammers. It is thought that "G Rag" is one of the earliest integrated recordings of Georgia musicians.

Among their recordings is "40 Drops", a tribute to Georgia corn moonshine, an instrumental with vocal comments - a style typical of instrumental recordings of the 1920s.

In May 2012, their recording of "K.C. Railroad Blues" was released on the compilation album Lonesome Whistle: An Anthology of American Railroad Songs.

== Bibliography ==
- Wayne W. Daniel, Pickin' on Peachtree: A History of Country Music in Atlanta, Georgia, (Urbana: University of Illinois Press, 1990), p. 76-77, ISBN 9780252016875
- Paul Kingsbury ed. The Encyclopedia of Country Music, (New York: Oxford University Press, 1998), s.v. "Georgia Yellow Hammers", ISBN 978-0195116717
- Gene Wiggins and Tony Russell, "Hell Broke Loose in Gordon County, Georgia", Old Time Music, 25 (Summer 1977): pp. 9-21
- Charles K. Wolfe, "The Georgia Yellow Hammers," in Classic Country: Legends of Country Music (New York: Routledge, 2001), ISBN 9780203900253
