= Georgia Yellow Hammers =

Georgia-based string and vocal quartet

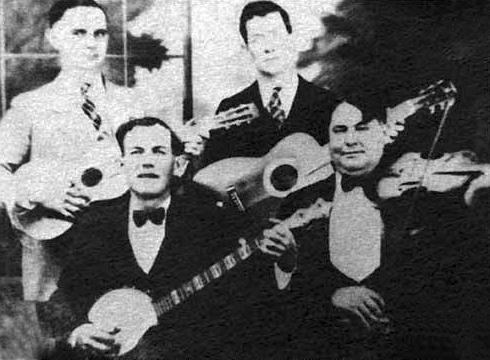
The Georgia Yellow Hammers

The Georgia Yellow Hammers were an American old-time string and vocal quartet from Gordon County, Georgia who performed in the 1920s. The group featured Charles Moody, Jr. on guitar; Bud Landress on banjo; Phil Reeve on guitar; and Bill Chitwood on fiddle. All members may have been multi-instrumentalists. Tony Russell's notes accompanying the 2004 compilation CD Old Mountain, identify the personnel on "The Picture on the Wall" (Victor 20943, August 9, 1927) as Landress, fiddle and lead vocal; Reeve, guitar and vocal; C. Ernest Moody, banjo-ukulele and vocal; and Clyde Evans, guitar and vocal.

== Collaboration with the Baxters ==
The group often played with Andrew and Jim Baxter from Curryville, Georgia (also in Gordon County). Curryville was also home to the musician Roland Hayes. Andrew Baxter's unique style of fiddle is heard an early recording of a band favorite entitled "G-Rag". The Baxters were African Americans, which was an unusual collaboration for the time period. The band released one of the top selling records of 1920s southern music with 1927's release "The Picture on the Wall" / "My Carolina Girl". The 1927 recording session with the Baxter's took place in Charlotte, North Carolina, and was a rare integrated session, uncommon even through the mid to late 20th century. Andrew and Jim Baxter were a well known duo for the time in their own right around Northwest Georgia.

== Legacy ==
The band is nationally recognized as an important 1920s "old-time" band. Their songs can still be heard from early recordings on such sites as YouTube and others. The song "Drifting Too Far From The Shore" written by member Charles Moody has been covered by such artists as Jerry Garcia, Emmylou Harris, Phil Lesh & Friends, Hank Williams, and many others, as well as being a standard in many gospel hymnals. The Calhoun High School football stadium in Calhoun, Georgia, is also named after the guitar player and founding member Phil Reeve.

== Songs ==
The Georgia Yellow Hammers recorded songs included:

- "Mary, Don't You Weep"
- "I'm S-A-V-E-D"
- "Pass Around the Bottle"
- "Fourth of July at a County Fair" (1927)
- "Going to Ride That Midnight Train"
- "Tennessee Coon" (1927)
- "My Carolina Girl" (1927)
- "G Rag" with Andrew Baxter (August 9, 1927)
- "Peaches Down in Georgia"
- "Picture on the Wall" (1928)
