= Bonaparte's Retreat (disambiguation) =

"Bonaparte's Retreat" is a traditional folk song recorded by Pee Wee King and Glen Campbell.

Bonaparte's Retreat may also refer to:

- "The Bonny Bunch of Roses", an English folk song also known as "Bonaparte's Retreat"
  - The Chieftains 6: Bonaparte's Retreat, an album that includes this tune
- One of the historical military defeats of the armies of Napoleon
