= Ed Andrews (blues musician) =

- Born: Unknown
- Died: Unknown
- Genres: Country blues
- Occupation: Musician
- Instruments: Vocal; 12-string guitar

Ed Andrews (Dates and places of birth and death unknown) was an American blues singer and guitarist, who made what are considered to be the first commercially released country blues recordings, in 1924, some three years before such releases became commonplace.

== Biography ==
Virtually nothing is known of Andrews' life. After the commercial success of some of the first female "classic blues" singers such as Mamie Smith, Ma Rainey and Bessie Smith in the early 1920s, the Okeh record company made field trips to the southern states to discover unrecorded musicians. In Atlanta, Georgia, they discovered and recorded Andrews in April 1924. He recorded two tracks, "Barrel House Blues" and "Time Ain't Gonna Make Me Stay", which were issued as Okeh Records (OK 8137). They were the first commercially released recordings of a male country blues singer. The record company's advertisement stated: "Right where the blues songs were born is where Ed. Andrews was singing ‘em and playing ‘em when the special OKeh Recording Expedition discovered him. Why, man alive, he was just scattering happiness all around, wherever he appeared."

It is not known whether Andrews originated from Atlanta, or was an itinerant musician passing through the city. He played 12-string guitar, and sang with a pronounced vibrato. His style has been likened to that of Peg Leg Howell, a Georgia musician who first recorded in 1926. On the basis of a lyric line, "Ain't got nobody lead me round and round", it has been conjectured that Andrews may have been blind.

Andrews made no further recordings. He was thought to have been "approaching middle age" when he recorded, but other aspects of his life are unknown.
