= Riley Puckett =

American singer-songwriter (1894–1946)

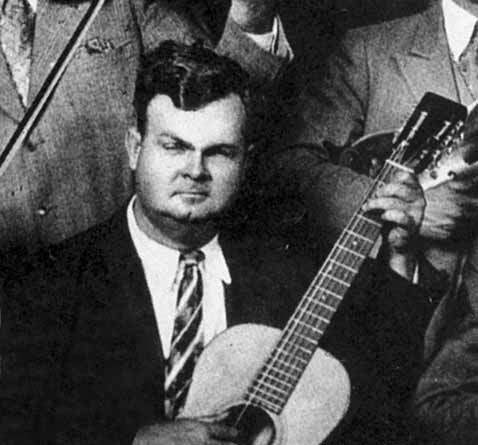

Background information
- Born: George Riley Puckett; May 7, 1894; Dallas, Georgia, U.S.
- Died: July 13, 1946 (aged 52) East Point, Georgia, U.S.
- Genres: Old time music
- Occupations: Musician, singer
- Instruments: Guitar, banjo, vocals
- Years active: 1924–1941

1934 song "Ragged But Right" by Riley Puckett.

George Riley Puckett (May 7, 1894 – July 13, 1946) was an American country music artist, best known as a member of Skillet Lickers.

His dynamic single-string guitar playing, featuring dramatic bass runs, earned for him an enviable reputation as an instrumentalist. Many aspiring guitarists who followed him have studied and copied his style. Although he was an accomplished musician on several instruments, his singing was most responsible for establishing him as an important figure in the history of country music.

== Early life ==
Puckett was born in Dallas, Georgia, United States. An incorrect treatment of his eyes using lead acetate during infancy left him blind. He had his formal education at the Georgia School for the Blind in Macon, Georgia.

== Career ==
He sang and played guitar and banjo. He was first heard on the radio as a part of Clayton McMichen's Hometown Band.

His vocalizing was a regular feature at the Georgia Old-Time Fiddlers Conventions. Newspaper reporters covering these events referred to him as the "Bald Mountain Caruso", in admiration of his renditions of such songs as "When You and I Were Young, Maggie" and "Sleep, Baby, Sleep". For several years, Puckett played and sang with the Home Town Boys, a string-band ensemble composed of Atlanta-area musicians. They made their debut on Atlanta's six-month-old radio station, WSB, on September 18, 1922. Until going off the air in 1926, they remained one of the station's most popular acts. In 1925, only Vernon Dalhart sold more records on the Columbia label than Puckett.

In 1924, Puckett accompanied fiddler Gid Tanner to New York, where, on March 7 and 8, they recorded twelve songs and tunes for the Columbia Phonograph Company. They were the first country-music artists to record for that firm. These recording sessions yielded vocal selections by Puckett and fiddle tunes by Tanner. One of Puckett's songs, "Rock All Our Babies to Sleep", (Columbia #107-D, with "Little Old Log Cabin in the Lane", on the reverse side), established him as probably the first country-music artist to yodel on records. It pre-dated Jimmie Rodgers first yodeling recordings by three years. Yodeling was employed as an embellishment by numerous country music vocalists well into the 1940s.

On November 4, 1929, Puckett, Clayton McMichen, Lowe Stokes, Fate Norris, Bert Layne, Uncle Fuzz (prob. Frank Walker, Tom Dorsey (aka Dan Hornsby) recorded in Atlanta, the track, "A Night in a Blind Tiger" on Columbia Records, and continued recording together on Blue Bird Records in March 1934, in San Antonio, Texas.

Puckett was a charter member of the influential string band Gid Tanner and His Skillet Lickers, and continued to record with the group through their last session in 1934. Puckett recorded as a solo artist into the early 1940s, creating a discography of more than 200 records on such labels as Columbia, Decca, and Bluebird. His repertoire included novelty songs, religious songs, traditional folk songs, cowboy songs, and ballads from the field of popular music.

He was one of the nationally known pioneer country music artists, who gained experience and exposure at the Georgia Old-Time Fiddlers Conventions, held in Atlanta between 1913 and 1934.

In addition to making records, he appeared in stage shows and worked on radio stations in Atlanta and other Georgia cities, as well as selected eastern and midwestern cities.

== Death ==
He died of blood poisoning on July 13, 1946, in East Point, Georgia. He had developed a pimple on his neck which turned into a boil. He ignored medical attention and continued to work until he became very ill. A doctor lanced the boil but it was too late, as sepsis had already set in, and he died in the hospital. He is buried at Enon Baptist Church.

Riley Puckett was inducted into the Georgia Music Hall of Fame in 1986.
