= Clayton McMichen =

American musician (1900–1970)

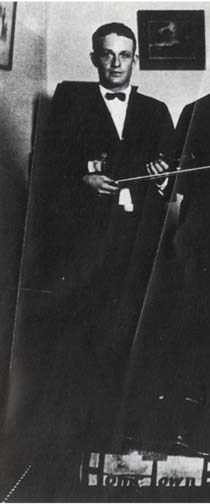

Background information
- Born: January 26, 1900; Allatoona, Georgia US
- Died: January 4, 1970 (aged 69) Battletown, Kentucky
- Genres: Old time, Country
- Occupation: Musician
- Instrument: Fiddle
- Formerly of: Lick the Skillet; Clayton McMichen and His Hometown Boys; Gid Tanner and His Skillet Lickers

Clayton McMichen (January 26, 1900 – January 4, 1970) was an American fiddler and country musician.

== Biography ==
Born in Allatoona, Georgia, McMichen learned to play the fiddle from his father and uncle. He moved to Atlanta with his family in 1913, working as an automobile mechanic. While there, he entered and won several competitions for fiddle. In 1918, he formed the band Lick the Skillet, which soon was renamed to the Home Town Boys. They played on a small radio station before they on September 18, 1922 started playing regular radio shows. In 1926, McMichen began recording with Gid Tanner and the Skillet Lickers.

They became one of the nation's most successful country acts of the 1920s and recorded widely. McMichen's first solo success was the 1927 hit "Sweet Bunch of Roses", which sold over 100,000 records. He also recorded crooner ballads under the name Bob Nichols, but only hit with the tune "My Carolina Home". One of his best-known tunes was "Peach Pickin' Time in Georgia", recorded by Jimmie Rodgers.

Clayton McMichen worked with an Atlanta, Georgia singer-songwriter, musician, Dan Hornsby producer engineer, recording "Ark. Traveler" Columbia 15253D issued in the 1920s.

The Skillet Lickers split in 1931, and McMichen organized a new band called the Georgia Wildcats, playing old timey, pop and jazz. They worked around the South, Northeast and Midwest until 1939. The band included guitarist Slim Bryant and, for a time, fiddler Carl Cotner and guitarist Merle Travis. They recorded for Decca from 1935 to 1938, settling in Louisville.

When he decided to form a full-sized dance band, Bryant took the smaller group and departed with McMichen's blessing. McMichen continued performing in Louisville until retiring in 1955. He was asked to restart his career during the folk revival of the 1960s, but was initially reticent; however, his performances at the Bean Blossom festival and the Newport Folk Festival in 1964 were successes. He continued to perform almost up until his death in 1970. In 1981, Merle Travis, Mac Wiseman, and Joe Maphis released a double LP album called The Clayton McMichen Story in tribute to him.

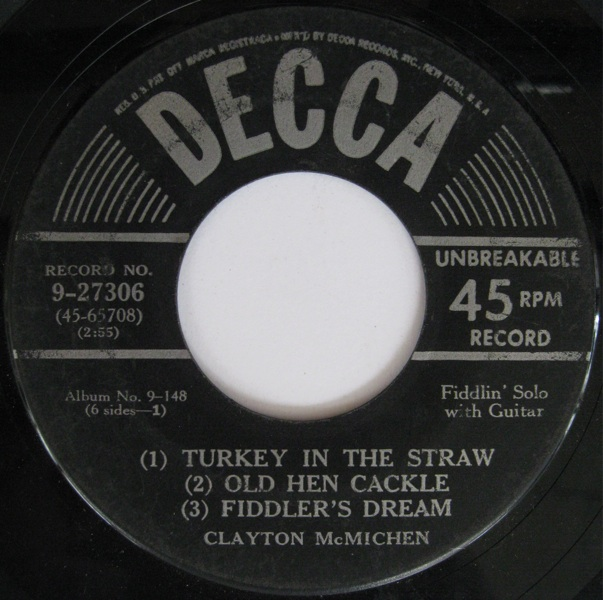
Turkey in the Straw,
Old Hen Cackle and
Fiddler's Dream by Clayton McMichen, Decca
