= Charles E. Moody =

American artist

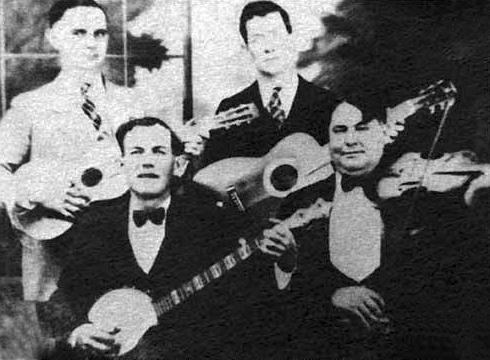
The Georgia Yellow Hammers: Phil Reeve (guitar, tenor), Uncle Bud Landress (banjo, tenor), Charles Ernest Moody (guitar, baritone), Bill Chitwood (violin, bass), 1921.

Charles Ernest Moody (a.k.a. Charbles Earnest Moody) was a gospel songwriter from Gordon County, Georgia, United States. He was a member of the 1920s string band Georgia Yellow Hammers from Calhoun, Georgia, which included members Bill Chitwood, Bud Landress, and Phil Reeve. The Yellow Hammers were a very popular string band with their biggest hit being "Picture on the Wall" which sold more than sixty thousand copies in 1928. Moody's individual songwriting talents were, however, dynamic.

After studying music in Dalton, Georgia, with A. J. Sims, Moody continued his studies at the Southern Development Normal School in Asheville, North Carolina, while directing music for a Tunnel Hill, Georgia, Methodist church. At some time prior to 1927 when he moved to Calhoun to teach in public schools, he began his affiliation with the Georgia Yellow Hammers. In 1938, being married with a family, Moody moved back to Tunnel Hill but in 1940 relocated to Calhoun.

After the Yellow Hammers disbanded, Moody was the choir director of the Calhoun First Methodist Church for many years. "Kneel at the Cross" and "Drifting too Far From the Shore" are hits for which Moody is most widely known as songwriter. Moody was born October 8, 1891, and died June 21, 1977. Moody married Fannie Brownlee (b. March 3, 1894, d. February 24, 1950), They had three children: Charles Brownlee Moody (b. 1928), Frances Moody Jones, Virginia Mae Moody Worth.

== Songs ==
Moody's songs have been recorded by many famous artists including Jerry Garcia, Emmylou Harris, Phil Lesh & Friends, and Hank Williams. Songs like "Kneel at the Cross" (1924) and "Drifting Too Far From the Shore" (1923) are gospel standards.

Moody wrote more than a hundred hymns, including:

- I Was Wandering in the Night (He Turned My Night to Day) (1919)
- Drifting Too Far from the Shore (1923)
- Kneel at the Cross (1924)
- Keep the Singing Spirit in Your Soul (As you go adown life's rugged way) (1935)
- Cling to Christ, He Is the Solid Rock (1935)
- Will You Be Ready (Jesus Is Coming Again Some Day) (1937)
- As I Travel Down Life's Road (O Lord Remember Me) (1947)
- I Will Look for You (When My Work on Earth Is Ended) (1947)
- All the Heroes of the Nation (They'll Be Marching) (1951)
- There's a Happy Land Somewhere Free (1951)
- It Will Be Glory (When I Shall Reach That City Fair) (1951)
- Let Us Hope and Pray (In This World We Have Trouble and Sadness)(1955)

Georgia Yellow Hammers recorded thirty-six songs on Victor records, in February, August, and October 1927, February and October 1928, and November 1929, including:

- Pass around the Bottle (February 18, 1927)
- Fourth of July at a County Fair (February 18, 1927)
- Going to Ride That Midnight Train (February 18, 1927)
- Mary, Don't You Weep (August 9, 1927)
- I'm S-A-V-E-D (August 9, 1927)
- Tennessee Coon (August 9, 1927)
- G Rag with Andrew Baxter (August 9, 1927)
- Picture on the Wall (August 9, 1927)
- My Carolina Girl (August 10, 1927)
- Peaches down in Georgia (November 27, 1929)
- The February 1927 recording session, in Atlanta, featured Bill Chitwood on violin and bass vocals, Uncle Bud Landress on banjo, tenor vocals (and perhaps violin on Fourth of July at a Country Fair), and Phil Reeve and Elias Meadows, both on guitars and tenor vocals. Charles Ernest Moody performed with the Georgia Yellow Hammers on later recordings.
