= On the Banks of the Old Ponchartrain =

1947 song performed by Hank Williams

Single by Hank Williams
- B-side: "Fly Trouble"
- Published: November 30, 1948 Acuff-Rose Publications
- Released: September 1947
- Recorded: August 4, 1947
- Studio: Castle Studio, Nashville
- Genre: Country
- Length: 2:51
- Label: MGM
- Songwriters: Hank Williams, (Kathleen) Ramona Vincent
- Producer: Fred Rose

Hank Williams singles chronology
"Move It on Over" (1947)	"On the Banks of the Old Ponchartrain" (1947)	"My Sweet Love Ain't Around" (1948)

On the Banks of the Old Ponchartrain is a song written by Hank Williams and Ramona Vincent. It was the singer's second single on MGM Records, released in September 1947.

== Background ==
According to biographer Colin Escott, Ramona Vincent, a crippled woman, wrote the words of the song as a poem and sent it to Williams, who put a melody to it. (According to U.S. Copyright Office, her legal name was Kathleen Ramona Vincent, born 1928). The song was paired with Fred Rose's novelty "Fly Trouble", resulting in perhaps the oddest single the singer ever released. The song was recorded at Castle Studio in Nashville on August 4, 1947 with Rose producing. Williams was backed by Tommy Jackson (fiddle), Hermon Herron (steel guitar), Sammy Pruett (lead guitar), Slim Thomas (rhythm guitar), and Lum York (bass). Hank had scored his first Billboard hit with "Move It on Over" but "On the Banks of the Old Ponchartrain" bombed. As Escott notes:

The coupling of "Fly Trouble" and "On the Banks of the Old Ponchartrain" flopped miserably, and in later years Hank would use it as a personal metaphor for a poor selling record. "Sure am glad it ain't another damn 'Ponchartrain'" he'd say when people would congratulate him on a hit. More than anything, it proved how much Rose had yet to learn about Hank's music and his audience.

The song tells the story of a criminal who escaped from a west Texas prison and stopped for a rest on the banks of Lake Pontchartrain where he falls in love with an unnamed woman only for him to be captured by a policeman and sent back to the prison he previously escaped from.

== Cover versions ==
- Rose Maddox covered the song on Capitol Records in 1959.
- Don Gibson cut the song for his 1971 LP Hank Williams as Sung by Don Gibson.
- A previously unreleased version of the song from 1973 can be found on the Hank Williams, Jr. retrospective Living Proof: The MGM Recordings 1963-1975.
- Sharon Shannon feat. Hothouse Flowers, The Diamond Mountain Sessions (2001)
- Bob Dylan covered the song live, in New Orleans, as part of the Rough and Rowdy Ways tour on April 1, 2024.
