= Move It On Over =

1947 single by Hank Williams

Single by Hank Williams With His Drifting Cowboys
- B-side: "(Last Night) I Heard You Crying in Your Sleep"
- Published: July 16, 1947 Acuff-Rose Publications
- Released: June 1947
- Recorded: April 21, 1947
- Studio: Castle Studio, Nashville
- Genre: Country; honky-tonk; blues; rockabilly
- Length: 2:49
- Label: MGM 10033
- Songwriter: Hank Hiram Williams
- Producer: Fred Rose

Hank Williams With His Drifting Cowboys singles chronology
"Pan American" (1947)	"Move It On Over" (1947)	"On the Banks of the Old Ponchartrain" (1947)

"Move It On Over" is a song written and recorded by the American country music singer-songwriter Hank Williams in 1947.

== Background ==
"Move It On Over" was recorded on April 21, 1947, at Castle Studio in Nashville, Williams' first session for MGM and the same session that produced "I Saw the Light," "(Last Night) I Heard You Crying in Your Sleep," and "Six More Miles to the Graveyard." Nashville had no session men during this period, so producer Fred Rose hired Red Foley's backing band, one of the sharpest around, to back Williams. As biographer Colin Escott observes, Rose probably felt the instrumental break needed a touch of class to smooth out Williams' hillbilly edges, and the band, especially guitarist Zeke Turner, was likely too fancy for the singer's taste.

The song is considered one of the earliest examples of rock and roll music. Though many claim the song "Rock Around the Clock," released in 1954 by Bill Haley & His Comets, was the first rock and roll single, it resembles "Move it On Over", as both feature the same twelve-bar blues arrangement with a melody starting with three repetitions of an ascending arpeggio of the tonic chord, which Williams had partially derived from an old Mardi Gras riff, "Second Line."

The song follows a man who is forced to sleep in the doghouse after coming home late at night and not being allowed into his house by his wife. In many respects, the song typified Williams' uncanny ability to express in a humorous way the aspects of everyday life that listeners could relate to—and rarely heard on the radio. As fiddler Jerry Rivers later recalled, Hank's novelty songs "weren't novelty—they were serious, not silly, and that's why they were much better accepted and better selling. 'Move It on Over' hits right home, 'cause half of the people he was singing to were in the doghouse with the ol' lady."

"Move It on Over" was Williams' first major hit, reaching #4 on the Billboard Most Played Juke Box Folk Records chart and got him a write up in The Alabama Journal. The revenue generated by the song was the first serious money the singer had ever seen in his life. It also earned him a spot on the coveted Louisiana Hayride, the training ground for the Grand Ole Opry.

== Chart performance ==
=== Hank Williams version ===
Year	Chart	Position
1947	U.S. Billboard Most Played Juke Box Folk Records	4

== Cover versions ==
Many others have recorded and performed the song subsequently. Notable hit versions were performed by:

- Cowboy Copas and Grandpa Jones 1947
- Bill Haley & His Comets recorded July 15, 1957, released on album Rockin' the Joint 1957
- George Thorogood and the Delaware Destroyers scored a major FM hit with the song when it was released on their second album Move It on Over.
- A version by Travis Tritt with George Thorogood was included on the 1999 King of the Hill: Original Soundtrack album. It peaked at #66 on the Billboard Hot Country Singles & Tracks chart.

== Sources ==
- Escott, Colin; Merritt, George; MacEwen, William (2004). Hank Williams: The Biography. New York: Little, Brown.
- Lipsitz, George (1990). Time Passages: Collective Memory and American Popular Culture. University of Minnesota Press. ISBN 0-8166-1805-4.
