= Pirates of the Mississippi discography =

American country music band discography

- Studio albums: 6
- Compilation albums: 1
- Singles: 14

American country music band Pirates of the Mississippi released six studio albums, one compilation album, and fourteen singles. Nine of their singles entered the Billboard Hot Country Songs charts. Their 1990 self-titled debut accounted for four chart entries including their most successful, 1991's "Feed Jake" at number 15. Their second-highest chart entry is 1992's "Til I'm Holding You Again" at number 22.

== Albums ==
Title	Album details	Peak chart positions			Certifications (sales thresholds)
Title	Album details	US Country	US	CAN Country	Certifications (sales thresholds)
Pirates of the Mississippi	Release date: July 10, 1990; Label: Capitol Nashville	12	80	—	CAN: Gold
Walk the Plank	Release date: September 30, 1991; Label: Capitol Nashville	39	—	26	
A Street Man Named Desire	Release date: September 28, 1992; Label: Liberty Records	75	—	—	
Dream You	Release date: October 19, 1993; Label: Liberty Records	—	—	—	
The Best of Pirates of the Mississippi	Release date: March 8, 1994; Label: Liberty Records	—	—	—	
Paradise	Release date: April 25, 1995; Label: Giant Records	—	—	—	
Heaven and a Dixie Night	Release date: November 7, 2006; Label: Evergreen	—	—	—	
"—" denotes releases that did not chart

== Singles ==
Year	Single	Peak chart positions		Album
Year	Single	US Country	CAN Country	Album
1990	"Honky Tonk Blues"	26	12	Pirates of the Mississippi
1990	"Rollin' Home"	49	40	Pirates of the Mississippi
1991	"Feed Jake"	15	12	Pirates of the Mississippi
1991	"Speak of the Devil"	29	20	Pirates of the Mississippi
1991	"Fighting for You"	41	51	Walk the Plank
1992	"Til I'm Holding You Again"	22	28	Walk the Plank
1992	"Too Much"	36	54	Walk the Plank
1992	"A Street Man Named Desire"	56	53	A Street Man Named Desire
1993	"Don't Quit Your Day Job"	—	—	A Street Man Named Desire
1993	"Dream You"	63	66	Dream You
1994	"Save the Wild Life"	—	—	Dream You
1995	"You Could Do Better"	—	—	—N/a
1995	"Paradise"	—	—	Paradise
2006	"Kickin' Up Dust"	—	—	Heaven and a Dixie Night
"—" denotes releases that did not chart

== Music videos ==
Year	Video	Director
1990	"Honky Tonk Blues"	
1991	"Rollin' Home"	Michael Salomon
1991	"Feed Jake"	Deaton-Flanigen Productions
1991	"Fighting for You"	Marius Penczner
1992	"Too Much"	Sherman Halsey
1992	"A Street Man Named Desire"	Joanne Gardner
1993	"Dream You"	Roger Pistole
1995	"You Could Do Better"	Chris Rogers
2006	"Kickin' Up Dust"	
2007	"Fish Bait"	
