= Billboard Top Country & Western Records of 1952 =

Billboard Top Country & Western Records of 1952 is made up of two year-end charts compiled by Billboard magazine ranking the year's top country and western records based on record sales and juke box plays.

Hank Thompson's "The Wild Side of Life" spent 15 weeks at No. 1 and was the No. 1 record of 1952 based on both retail sales and juke box plays. Kitty Wells' "It Wasn't God Who Made Honky Tonk Angels", which was an answer song to "The Wild Side of Life," ranked No. 4 on the retail sales chart.

Hank Williams led all artists with five records included on the year-end charts. His record of "Jambalaya (On the Bayou)" was No. 3 on the year-end retail sales chart while "Half as Much" ranked No. 11 on the same chart.

Carl Smith had four records on the year-end charts. His recording of "Let Old Mother Nature Have Her Way" ranked No. 2 based on both retail sales and juke box plays.

Lefty Frizzell also had four records on the year-end charts, including the year's No. 6 juke box record, "Give Me More, More, More (Of Your Kisses)".

Columbia Records led the other labels with 11 records on the year-end charts, followed by RCA Victor with nine, and Decca with seven.

Retail year-end	Juke box year-end	Peak (Note: This column recites the record's peak position on Billboard's weekly charts.)	Title	Artist(s)	Label
1	1	1	"The Wild Side of Life"	Hank Thompson	Capitol
2	2	1	"Let Old Mother Nature Have Her Way"	Carl Smith	Columbia
3	8	1	"Jambalaya (On the Bayou)"	Hank Williams	M-G-M
4	9	1	"It Wasn't God Who Made Honky Tonk Angels"	Kitty Wells	Decca
5	5	1	"Slow Poke"	Pee Wee King	RCA Victor
6	13	2	"Indian Love Call"	Slim Whitman	Imperial
7	7	1	"Wonderin'"	Webb Pierce	Decca
8	4	1	"(When You Feel Like You're in Love) Don't Just Stand There"	Carl Smith	Columbia
9	12	2	"Almost"	George Morgan	Columbia
10	6	1	"Give Me More, More, More (Of Your Kisses)"	Lefty Frizzell	Columbia
11	14	2	"Half as Much"	Hank Williams	M-G-M
12	3	1	"Easy on the Eyes"	Eddy Arnold	RCA Victor
13	10	2	"The Gold Rush Is Over"	Hank Snow	RCA Victor
14	11	1	"Are You Teasing Me"	Carl Smith	Columbia
15	21	1	"A Full Time Job"	Eddy Arnold	RCA Victor
16	NR	3	"Missing in Action"	Ernest Tubb	Decca
17	15	3	"Waiting in the Lobby of Your Heart"	Hank Thompson	Capitol
18	NR	5	"Too Old to Cut the Mustard"	Red Foley, Ernest Tubb	Decca
19	17	2	"Don't Stay Away (Till Love Grows Cold)"	Lefty Frizzell	Columbia
20	24	1	"That Heart Belongs to Me"	Webb Pierce	Decca
21	29	2	"Lady's Man"	Hank Snow	RCA Victor
22	20	1	"Back Street Affair"	Webb Pierce	Decca
23	NR	2	"Mom and Dad's Waltz"	Lefty Frizzell	Columbia
24	16	4	"Bundle of Southern Sunshine"	Eddy Arnold	RCA Victor
25	NR	5	"It's a Lovely, Lovely World"	Carl Smith	Columbia
26	NR	1	"Always Late (With Your Kisses)"	Lefty Frizzell	Columbia
27	28	2	"Wild Side of Life"	Burl Ives	Columbia
28	19	2	"Honky Tonk Blues"	Hank Williams	M-G-M
29	30	3	"Talk to Your Heart"	Ray Price	Columbia
30	18	5	"Silver and Gold"	Pee Wee King	RCA Victor
NR	22	3	"Alabama Jubilee"	Red Foley	Decca
NR	23	4	"Baby, We're Really in Love"	Hank Williams	M-G-M
NR	25	4	"Music Makin' Mama From Memphis"	Hank Snow	RCA Victor
NR	26	3	"I Went to Your Wedding"	Hank Snow	RCA Victor
NR	27	4	"Crazy Heart"	Hank Williams	M-G-M

== See also ==
- List of Billboard number-one country songs of 1952
- Billboard year-end top 30 singles of 1952
- 1952 in country music
