= List of Billboard number-one country songs of 1952 =

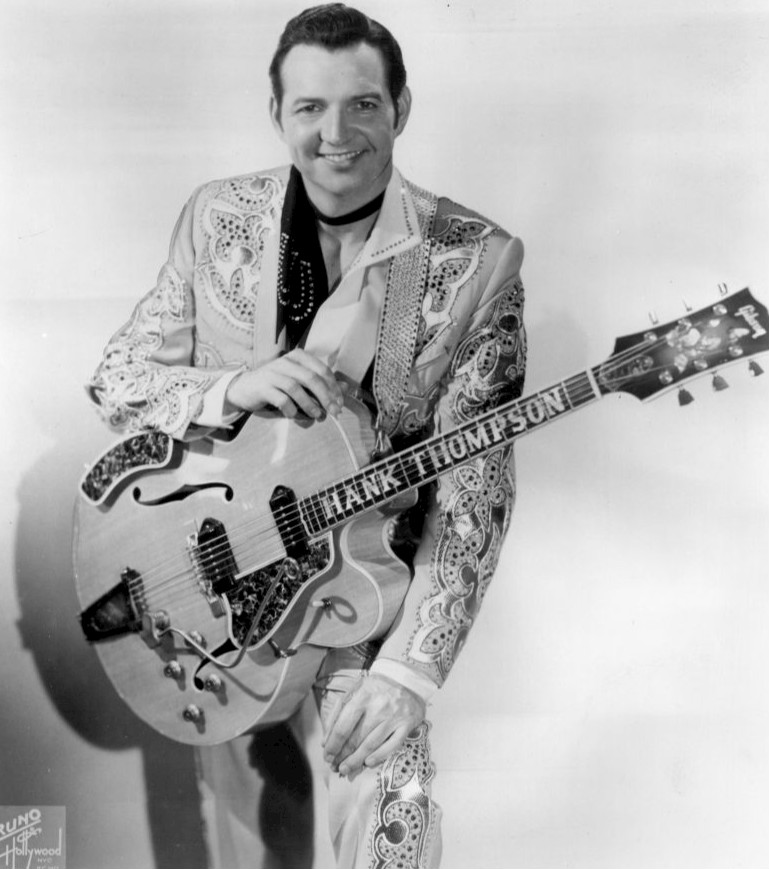
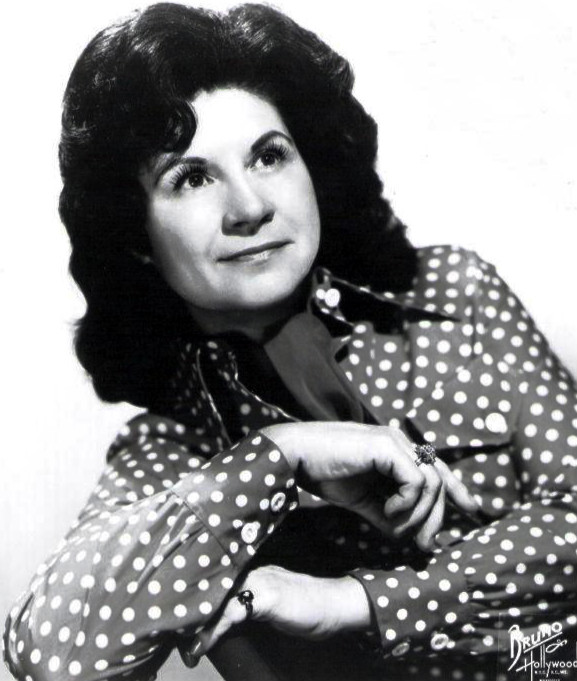
Hank Thompson's song "The Wild Side of Life" was followed into the number one position by "It Wasn't God Who Made Honky Tonk Angels" by Kitty Wells, which had been written as an answer song to it.

In 1952, Billboard magazine published three charts covering the best-performing country music songs in the United States. At the start of the year, the charts were published under the titles Most-Played Juke Box (Country & Western) Records, Best-Selling Retail Folk (Country & Western) Records and Country & Western Records Most Played By Folk Disk Jockeys. Beginning with the issue of Billboard dated November 15, the titles of the charts were changed to Most Played in Juke Boxes, National Best Sellers, and Most Played By Jockeys respectively, with the genre denoted in an overall page title rather than within the titles of the charts themselves. All three charts are considered part of the lineage of the multimetric Hot Country Songs chart, which was first published in 1958.

In the first issue of Billboard of the year, "Slow Poke" by Pee Wee King retained its place at number one on both the juke box and retail charts from the previous week but was displaced from the top spot on the jockeys chart by Carl Smith's "Let Old Mother Nature Have Her Way". Smith had three number-one country songs in 1952, two of which topped all three listings. Webb Pierce was the only other artist to take as many as three different songs to the top spot in 1952, although none of his songs reached number one on all three charts during the year. The longest-running number one on both the juke box and retail charts was "The Wild Side of Life" by Hank Thompson, which on both listings spent fifteen consecutive weeks in the top spot before being replaced by "It Wasn't God Who Made Honky Tonk Angels" by Kitty Wells. Wells' song, which had been written as an answer song to "The Wild Side of Life", was the first million-selling country single by a female artist and the first Billboard country number one by a solo female. Despite this success, it did not top the jockeys chart, as the song's lyrics were deemed too controversial by some radio stations.

The longest-running number one on the jockeys chart was "Jambalaya (On the Bayou)" by Hank Williams, which spent thirteen non-consecutive weeks atop the chart. The Cajun-inspired song was the final number one of the year on both that chart and the retail listing and was thus in the top spot when Williams died early on January 1, 1953. The year's final number one on the juke box chart was "Don't Let the Stars Get in Your Eyes" by Skeets McDonald, which reached the peak position in the issue of Billboard dated December 27. McDonald's version of the song reached the top spot three weeks after its writer, Slim Willet, had taken his own recording of the track to number one on the jockeys chart. The song would prove to be the only country number one for both McDonald and Willet and both had only short chart careers; in Willet's case it was his only charting song. In contrast, the three other singers who reached number one for the first time in 1952 would go on to achieve further chart-toppers and be elected into the Country Music Hall of Fame in recognition of their long and successful careers. Hank Thompson and Kitty Wells each gained the first of three number ones in 1952 and remained top 10 regulars until the late 1960s. Webb Pierce topped the jockeys chart in March with "Wondering", his first charting song. It was the first of 12 number ones which the singer gained in less than four years, and he achieved more than 80 top 40 entries during his career.

== Chart history ==
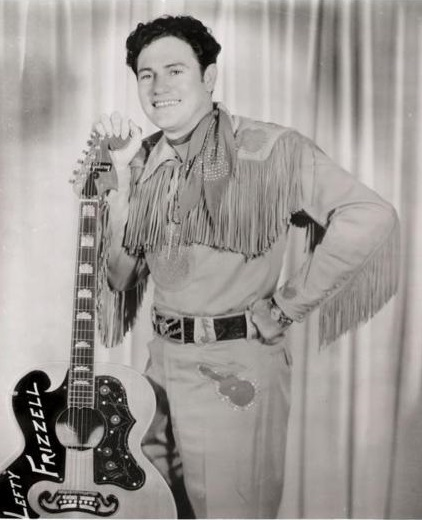
Lefty Frizzell took the song "Give Me More, More, More (Of Your Kisses)" to number one in February.

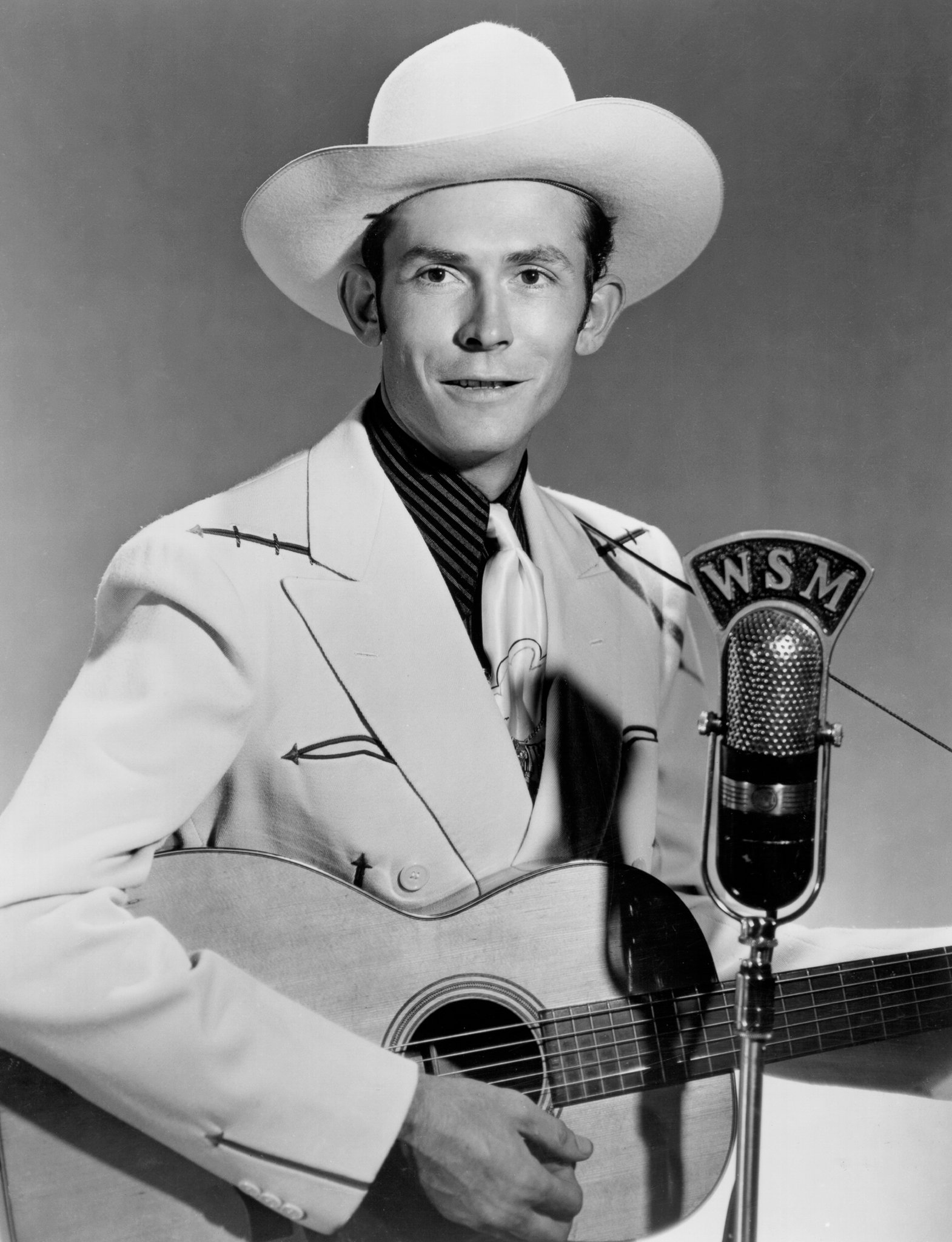
Hank Williams ended the year at number one on the retail chart. He died in the early hours of January 1, 1953.

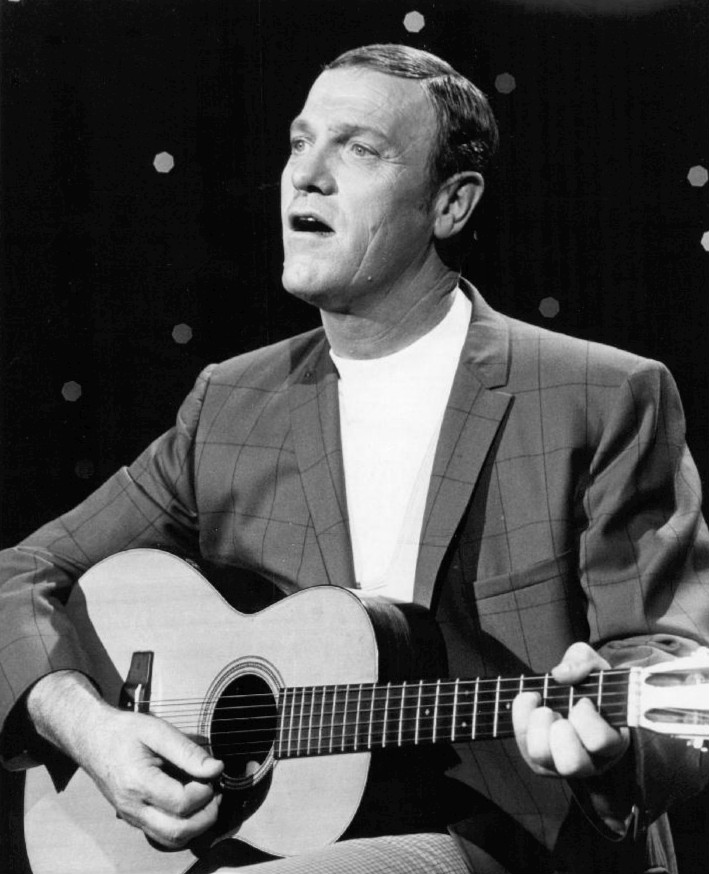
"A Full Time Job" by Eddy Arnold (pictured in later life) topped only the jockeys chart.

Chart history
Issue date	Juke Box		Best Sellers		Jockeys		Ref.
Issue date	Title	Artist(s)	Title	Artist(s)	Title	Artist(s)	Ref.
January 5	"Slow Poke"	Pee Wee King	"Slow Poke"	Pee Wee King	"Let Old Mother Nature Have Her Way"	Carl Smith	
January 12	"Slow Poke"	Pee Wee King	"Slow Poke"	Pee Wee King	"Let Old Mother Nature Have Her Way"	Carl Smith	
January 19	"Slow Poke"	Pee Wee King	"Slow Poke"	Pee Wee King	"Slow Poke"	Pee Wee King	
January 26	"Slow Poke"	Pee Wee King	"Slow Poke"	Pee Wee King	"Slow Poke"	Pee Wee King	
February 2	"Slow Poke"	Pee Wee King	"Slow Poke"	Pee Wee King	"Give Me More, More, More (Of Your Kisses)"	Lefty Frizzell	
February 9	"Give Me More, More, More (Of Your Kisses)"	Lefty Frizzell	"Slow Poke"	Pee Wee King	"Slow Poke"	Pee Wee King	
February 16	"Let Old Mother Nature Have Her Way"	Carl Smith	"Slow Poke"	Pee Wee King	"Give Me More, More, More (Of Your Kisses)"	Lefty Frizzell	
February 23	"Slow Poke"	Pee Wee King	"Slow Poke"	Pee Wee King	"Give Me More, More, More (Of Your Kisses)"	Lefty Frizzell	
March 1	"Let Old Mother Nature Have Her Way"	Carl Smith	"Slow Poke"	Pee Wee King	"Wondering"	Webb Pierce	
March 8	"Let Old Mother Nature Have Her Way"	Carl Smith	"Let Old Mother Nature Have Her Way"	Carl Smith	"Wondering"	Webb Pierce	
March 15	"Give Me More, More, More (Of Your Kisses)"	Lefty Frizzell	"Let Old Mother Nature Have Her Way"	Carl Smith	"Wondering"	Webb Pierce	
March 22	"Give Me More, More, More (Of Your Kisses)"	Lefty Frizzell	"Let Old Mother Nature Have Her Way"	Carl Smith	"Wondering"	Webb Pierce	
March 29	"Let Old Mother Nature Have Her Way"	Carl Smith	"Let Old Mother Nature Have Her Way"	Carl Smith	"(When You Feel Like You're in Love) Don't Just Stand There"	Carl Smith	
April 5	"Let Old Mother Nature Have Her Way"	Carl Smith	"Let Old Mother Nature Have Her Way"	Carl Smith	"(When You Feel Like You're in Love) Don't Just Stand There"	Carl Smith	
April 12	"(When You Feel Like You're in Love) Don't Just Stand There"	Carl Smith	"Let Old Mother Nature Have Her Way"	Carl Smith	"(When You Feel Like You're in Love) Don't Just Stand There"	Carl Smith	
April 19	"Let Old Mother Nature Have Her Way"	Carl Smith	"(When You Feel Like You're in Love) Don't Just Stand There"	Carl Smith	"(When You Feel Like You're in Love) Don't Just Stand There"	Carl Smith	
April 26	"Let Old Mother Nature Have Her Way"	Carl Smith	"(When You Feel Like You're in Love) Don't Just Stand There"	Carl Smith	"(When You Feel Like You're in Love) Don't Just Stand There"	Carl Smith	
May 3	"Let Old Mother Nature Have Her Way"	Carl Smith	"Easy on the Eyes"	Eddy Arnold	"(When You Feel Like You're in Love) Don't Just Stand There"	Carl Smith	
May 10	"(When You Feel Like You're in Love) Don't Just Stand There"	Carl Smith	"The Wild Side of Life"	Hank Thompson	"(When You Feel Like You're in Love) Don't Just Stand There"	Carl Smith	
May 17	"(When You Feel Like You're in Love) Don't Just Stand There"	Carl Smith	"The Wild Side of Life"	Hank Thompson	"The Wild Side of Life"	Hank Thompson	
May 24	"The Wild Side of Life"	Hank Thompson	"The Wild Side of Life"	Hank Thompson	"(When You Feel Like You're in Love) Don't Just Stand There"	Carl Smith	
May 31	"The Wild Side of Life"	Hank Thompson	"The Wild Side of Life"	Hank Thompson	"The Wild Side of Life"	Hank Thompson	
June 7	"The Wild Side of Life"	Hank Thompson	"The Wild Side of Life"	Hank Thompson	"The Wild Side of Life"	Hank Thompson	
June 14	"The Wild Side of Life"	Hank Thompson	"The Wild Side of Life"	Hank Thompson	"The Wild Side of Life"	Hank Thompson	
June 21	"The Wild Side of Life"	Hank Thompson	"The Wild Side of Life"	Hank Thompson	"The Wild Side of Life"	Hank Thompson	
June 28	"The Wild Side of Life"	Hank Thompson	"The Wild Side of Life"	Hank Thompson	"The Wild Side of Life"	Hank Thompson	
July 5	"The Wild Side of Life"	Hank Thompson	"The Wild Side of Life"	Hank Thompson	"The Wild Side of Life"	Hank Thompson	
July 12	"The Wild Side of Life"	Hank Thompson	"The Wild Side of Life"	Hank Thompson	"That Heart Belongs to Me"	Webb Pierce	
July 19	"The Wild Side of Life"	Hank Thompson	"The Wild Side of Life"	Hank Thompson	"Are You Teasing Me"	Carl Smith	
July 26	"The Wild Side of Life"	Hank Thompson	"The Wild Side of Life"	Hank Thompson	"That Heart Belongs to Me"	Webb Pierce	
August 2	"The Wild Side of Life"	Hank Thompson	"The Wild Side of Life"	Hank Thompson	"The Wild Side of Life"	Hank Thompson	
August 9	"The Wild Side of Life"	Hank Thompson	"The Wild Side of Life"	Hank Thompson	"That Heart Belongs to Me"	Webb Pierce	
August 16	"The Wild Side of Life"	Hank Thompson	"The Wild Side of Life"	Hank Thompson	"A Full Time Job"	Eddy Arnold	
August 23	"The Wild Side of Life"	Hank Thompson	"It Wasn't God Who Made Honky Tonk Angels"	Kitty Wells	"A Full Time Job"	Eddy Arnold	
August 30	"The Wild Side of Life"	Hank Thompson	"It Wasn't God Who Made Honky Tonk Angels"	Kitty Wells	"A Full Time Job"	Eddy Arnold	
September 6	"It Wasn't God Who Made Honky Tonk Angels"	Kitty Wells	"It Wasn't God Who Made Honky Tonk Angels"	Kitty Wells	"Jambalaya (On the Bayou)"	Hank Williams	
September 13	"It Wasn't God Who Made Honky Tonk Angels"	Kitty Wells	"It Wasn't God Who Made Honky Tonk Angels"	Kitty Wells	"Jambalaya (On the Bayou)"	Hank Williams	
September 20	"It Wasn't God Who Made Honky Tonk Angels"	Kitty Wells	"It Wasn't God Who Made Honky Tonk Angels"	Kitty Wells	"A Full Time Job"	Eddy Arnold	
September 27	"It Wasn't God Who Made Honky Tonk Angels"	Kitty Wells	"It Wasn't God Who Made Honky Tonk Angels"	Kitty Wells	"Jambalaya (On the Bayou)"	Hank Williams	
October 4	"It Wasn't God Who Made Honky Tonk Angels"	Kitty Wells	"Jambalaya (On the Bayou)"	Hank Williams	"Jambalaya (On the Bayou)"	Hank Williams	
October 11	"Jambalaya (On the Bayou)"	Hank Williams	"Jambalaya (On the Bayou)"	Hank Williams	"Jambalaya (On the Bayou)"	Hank Williams	
October 18	"Jambalaya (On the Bayou)"	Hank Williams	"Jambalaya (On the Bayou)"	Hank Williams	"Jambalaya (On the Bayou)"	Hank Williams	
October 25	"Jambalaya (On the Bayou)"	Hank Williams	"Jambalaya (On the Bayou)"	Hank Williams	"Jambalaya (On the Bayou)"	Hank Williams	
November 1	"Jambalaya (On the Bayou)"	Hank Williams	"Jambalaya (On the Bayou)"	Hank Williams	"Jambalaya (On the Bayou)"	Hank Williams	
November 8	"Jambalaya (On the Bayou)"	Hank Williams	"Jambalaya (On the Bayou)"	Hank Williams	"Jambalaya (On the Bayou)"	Hank Williams	
November 15	"Jambalaya (On the Bayou)"	Hank Williams	"Jambalaya (On the Bayou)"	Hank Williams	"Jambalaya (On the Bayou)"	Hank Williams	
November 22	"Jambalaya (On the Bayou)"	Hank Williams	"Jambalaya (On the Bayou)"	Hank Williams	"Jambalaya (On the Bayou)"	Hank Williams	
November 29	"Jambalaya (On the Bayou)"	Hank Williams	"Jambalaya (On the Bayou)"	Hank Williams	"Jambalaya (On the Bayou)"	Hank Williams	
December 6	"Jambalaya (On the Bayou)"	Hank Williams	"Back Street Affair"	Webb Pierce	"Don't Let the Stars Get in Your Eyes"	Slim Willet	
December 13	"Jambalaya (On the Bayou)"	Hank Williams	"Jambalaya (On the Bayou)"	Hank Williams	"Back Street Affair"	Webb Pierce	
December 20	"Jambalaya (On the Bayou)"	Hank Williams	"Jambalaya (On the Bayou)"	Hank Williams	"Back Street Affair"	Webb Pierce	
December 27	"Don't Let the Stars Get in Your Eyes"	Skeets McDonald	"Jambalaya (On the Bayou)"	Hank Williams	"Jambalaya (On the Bayou)"	Hank Williams	

== See also ==
- 1952 in country music
- List of artists who reached number one on the U.S. country chart
