= 1952 in country music =

This is a list of notable events in country music that took place in the year 1952.

== Events ==
- July 14 — The Eddy Arnold Show, a brief summer replacement series, debuts on CBS-TV.
- August 23 — Kitty Wells becomes the first female solo artist to score a No. 1 hit on the Billboard country charts with "It Wasn't God Who Made Honky Tonk Angels." The song, an answer to Hank Thompson's "The Wild Side of Life," spends two weeks atop the chart and forever changes how women were seen, both in song and professionally.
- November 22 — Nashville's first Disc Jockey Convention takes place.

=== No dates ===
- The life of Hank Williams continues its downward spiral. Even though he enjoys several major hits, his drug and alcohol problems ruin his marriage to Audrey (the divorce was finalized on May 29), and in October, he is fired from the Grand Ole Opry. Williams marries Billie Jean Jones Eshliman in October in New Orleans, Louisiana, and rejoins Louisiana Hayride about that same time. Also during the year, he makes what turn out to be his final recordings.

=== Top Hits Of 1952 ===
==== United States ====
(as certified by Billboard)

Year End Rank	Single Name	Artist	Peak Date	Weeks At Peak	Spec. Note
001	The Wild Side of Life	Hank Thompson and His Brazo Valley Boys	May 10	15	^{[1]}
002	Jambalaya (On the Bayou)	Hank Williams with His Drifting Cowboys	Sept 6	14	^{[2]}
003	(When You Feel Like You're in Love) Don't Just Stand There	Carl Smith	March 29	8	^{[2]}
004	It Wasn't God Who Made Honky Tonk Angels	Kitty Wells	August 23	6	^{[A]}: The answer song to "The Wild Side of Life"
005	Wondering	Webb Pierce	March 1	4	^{[A]}
006	Back Street Affair	Webb Pierce	Dec 6	4	^{[2]}
007	A Full-Time Job	Eddy Arnold	August 16	4
008	Give Me More, More, More (Of Your Kisses)	Lefty Frizzell	February 2	3	^{[2]}
009	That Heart Belongs to Me	Webb Pierce	July 12	3	^{[2]}
010	Don't Let the Stars Get in Your Eyes	Skeets McDonald	Dec 27	3	^{[B]}
011	Don't Let the Stars Get in Your Eyes	Slim Willet	Dec 6	1	^{[B]}
012	Are You Teasing Me	Carl Smith	July 19	1
013	Easy on the Eyes	Eddy Arnold	May 3	1

Notes

- 1 No. 1 song of the year, as determined by Billboard.
- 2 Song dropped from No. 1 and later returned to top spot.
- A First Billboard No. 1 hit for that artist.
- B Only Billboard No. 1 hit for that artist.

=== Other major hits ===
US	Single	Artist
2	Almost	George Morgan
4	Baby, We're Really in Love	Hank Williams
6	Blackberry Boogie	Tennessee Ernie Ford
5	Blue Christmas	Ernest Tubb
4	Bundle of Southern Sunshine	Eddy Arnold
8	Busybody	Pee Wee King
9	Call Her Your Sweetheart	Eddy Arnold
4	Don't Let the Stars Get in Your Eyes	Ray Price
2	Don't Stay Away (Till Love Grows Cold)	Lefty Frizzell
6	Forever (And Always)	Lefty Frizzell
5	Fortunes in Memories	Ernest Tubb
2	The Gold Rush Is Over	Hank Snow
2	Half as Much	Hank Williams
2	Honky Tonk Blues	Hank Williams
7	How Long Will It Take (To Stop Loving You)	Lefty Frizzell
7	I Saw Mommy Kissing Santa Claus	Jimmy Boyd
3	I Went to Your Wedding	Hank Snow
9	I'd Trade All of My Tomorrows (For Just One Yesterday)	Eddy Arnold
2	Indian Love Call	Slim Whitman
5	It's a Lovely, Lovely World	Carl Smith
2	Lady's Man	Hank Snow
2	Let's Live a Little	Carl Smith
10	Love Song of the Waterfall	Slim Whitman
8	Married by the Bible, Divorced by the Law	Hank Snow
8	Milk Bucket Boogie	Red Foley
3	Missing in Action	Ernest Tubb
4	Music Makin' Mama from Memphis	Hank Snow
10	My Heart Is Broken in Three	Slim Whitman
10	The New Wears Off Too Fast	Hank Thompson
6	Our Honeymoon	Carl Smith
8	Salty Dog Rag	Red Foley
2	Settin' the Woods on Fire	Hank Williams
5	Silver and Gold	Pee Wee King
7	Slow Poke	Hawkshaw Hawkins
9	Somebody's Stolen My Honey	Ernest Tubb
3	Talk to Your Heart	Ray Price
7	Three Ways of Knowing	Johnnie & Jack
10	Till the End of the World	Bing Crosby and Grady Martin
8	'Tis Sweet to Be Remembered	Cowboy Copas
9	'Tis Sweet to Be Remembered	Flatt & Scruggs
5	Too Old to Cut the Mustard	Ernest Tubb and Red Foley
6	Too Old to Cut the Mustard	The Carlisles
3	Waiting in the Lobby of Your Heart	Hank Thompson
6	The Wild Side of Life	Burl Ives and Grady Martin
10	You Win Again	Hank Williams

== Births ==
- January 12 — Ricky Van Shelton, honky tonk-styled vocalist of the mid-to-late 1980s and early 1990s.
- January 22 — Teddy Gentry, member of Alabama.
- February 18 — Juice Newton, pop-styled country vocalist of the 1980s.
- February 29 — Billy Joe Walker Jr., American musician, record producer, and songwriter (d. 2017).
- May 10 — Kikki Danielsson, Swedish female country singer.
- May 18 — George Strait, country giant since the early 1980s, who helped revitalize the genre.
- July 31 — K.W. Turnbow, drummer of the Western Underground.
- October 11 — Paulette Carlson, female lead vocalist with the band Highway 101 during the peak of its success in the 1980s.
- October 13 — Mundo Earwood, country singer of the 1970s and 1980s. (d. 2014)
- October 19 — Charlie Chase, radio and television personality, one half of Crook & Chase.
- October 24 — Mark Gray, one-time member of Exile who became a solo star in the mid-1980s. (d. 2016)

== Deaths ==
- March 22 — Uncle Dave Macon, 81, country music pioneer; comedian and banjo player; the first major star of the Grand Ole Opry.
- May 4 – J.L. "Joe" Frank, 52, music executive.
- December 4 – Rabon Delmore, 36, one half of the old-time harmony duo Delmore Brothers.
