= Let's Turn Back the Years =

Single by Hank Williams With His Drifting Cowboys
- A-side: "Half as Much"
- Published: March 3, 1952 Acuff-Rose Publications
- Released: March 1952
- Recorded: August 10, 1951
- Studio: Castle Studio, Nashville
- Genre: Country & Western, Honky-tonk, Country blues
- Label: MGM
- Songwriter: Hank Williams
- Producer: Fred Rose

Hank Williams With His Drifting Cowboys singles chronology
"Honky Tonk Blues" (1952)	"Let's Turn Back the Years" (1952)	"Jambalaya (On the Bayou)" (1952)

"Let's Turn Back the Years" is a song written and originally recorded by Hank Williams for MGM Records.

== Background ==
By May 1952, Hank Williams was the biggest country music star in the world. Despite his binge drinking and no shows, he appeared to be invincible on the country charts and had become the first country songwriter to make significant inroads into the pop charts. "Baby, We're Really in Love" was in the charts for fifteen weeks starting in December 1951, and it was followed in March 1952 by "Honky Tonk Blues," which peaked at #2 and stayed twelve weeks on the charts. "Honky Tonk Blues" was followed in May by "Half as Much," which peaked at #2 and stayed around for four months. "Cold, Cold Heart" was still on the charts as 1952 dawned, and "Hey Good Lookin'" had yet to drop from heavy rotation. However, Williams' personal life was heading in the other direction; much to his chagrin, he would be legally divorced from his wife Audrey Williams on July 10, 1952. "Let's Turn Back the Years," which served as the B-side to Curley Williams' "Half as Much," may have been his final plea to the love of his life to return to happier times. The backing on the December 1951 session is believed to have been Don Helms (steel guitar), Jerry Rivers (fiddle), possibly Sam Pruett (electric guitar), probably Jack Shook (acoustic guitar), and Ernie Newton or Howard Watts (bass). Fred Rose produced the session.

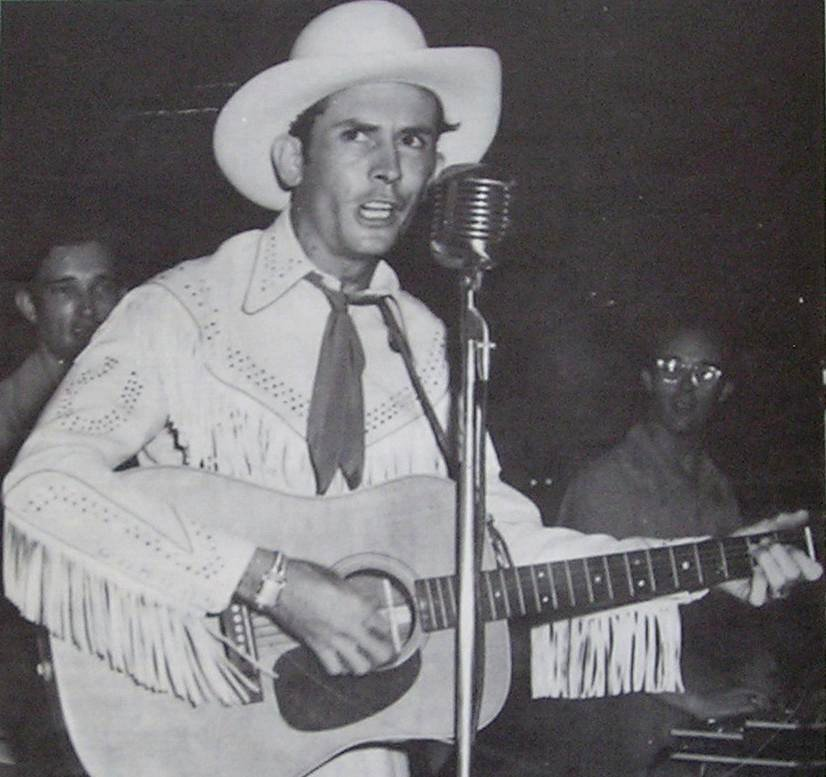
Hank Williams in concert in 1951

== Cover versions ==
- Williams' friend and rival Lefty Frizzell covered the song for Columbia.
- Honky tonk legend Ernest Tubb cut the song for Decca in 1969.
- Stonewall Jackson cut the song for Columbia in 1969.
- Waylon Jennings included it on his 1975 album Dreaming My Dreams.
- John Prine and Lucinda Williams recorded the song as a duet as part of a medley with "Wedding Bells"
