= I'd Still Want You =

Single by Hank Williams With His Drifting Cowboys
- A-side: "Baby, We're Really in Love"
- Published: December 5, 1951 Acuff-Rose Publications
- Released: November 1951
- Recorded: July 25, 1951
- Studio: Castle Studio, Nashville
- Genre: Country, honky-tonk, blues
- Length: 2:32
- Label: MGM
- Songwriter: Hank Williams
- Producer: Fred Rose

Hank Williams With His Drifting Cowboys singles chronology
"(I Heard That) Lonesome Whistle'" (1951)	"I'd Still Want You" (1951)	"Honky Tonk Blues" (1952)

"I'd Still Want You" is a song written and recorded by Hank Williams and released on MGM Records. It was selected to be the B-side to the up-tempo "Baby, We're Really in Love." Williams biographer Colin Escott calls it "another bleak commentary on Hank's continuing need for Audrey [Williams, his wife] as she closed off her heart to him." It was recorded at Castle Studio in Nashville on July 25, 1951 with Fred Rose producing and backing from Don Helms (steel guitar), Jerry Rivers (fiddle), Sammy Pruett (lead guitar), Howard Watts (bass) and probably Jack Shook (rhythm guitar).
