= I'm Sorry for You, My Friend =

Single by Hank Williams With His Drifting Cowboys
- A-side: "Honky Tonk Blues"
- Released: February 1952
- Recorded: August 10, 1951
- Studio: Castle Studio, Nashville
- Genre: Country
- Length: 2:41
- Label: MGM
- Songwriter: Hank Williams
- Producer: Fred Rose

Hank Williams With His Drifting Cowboys singles chronology
"Baby, We're Really in Love" (1951)	"I'm Sorry for You, My Friend" (1952)	"Half as Much" (1951)

"I'm Sorry for You, My Friend" is a song written and recorded by Hank Williams. It was released as the flipside to his single "Honky Tonk Blues" in 1952 on MGM Records.

== Background ==
According to country music historian Colin Escott, Hank Williams' friend and rival Lefty Frizzell always claimed that Hank wrote "I'm Sorry for You, My Friend" about him, quoting the Texan as saying, "All Hank thought about was writing. He recorded a number he wrote because I was having trouble with my better half called 'I'm Sorry for You, My Friend.' We'd swap songs we'd written." Frizzell had emerged as Williams' biggest competition in the early fifties; as the 2001 documentary series Lost Highway: The History of American Country put it, "He was the one honky tonk singer who could match Hank's jukebox appeal nickel for nickel, tear for tear." Like Williams, Frizzell was a gifted writer and, also like Williams, had a reckless personal life dogged with marital strife and alcoholism. The pair actually toured together in April 1951 in what writer Dan Cooper called, "honky tonk's apex, the instant that symbolized the genre's zenith."

Williams recorded the song at a session at Castle Studio in Nashville on August 10, 1951. He was backed by Jerry Rivers (fiddle), Don Helms (steel guitar), Sammy Pruett (lead guitar), Howard Watts (bass), probably Jack Shook (rhythm guitar), and either Owen Bradley or Fred Rose on piano.

== Cover versions ==
- Ivory Joe Hunter recorded it for MGM in 1952.
- Joni James covered the song for MGM.
- Don Gibson recorded the song for RCA in 1962.
- Hank Williams, Jr. cut the song in 1974.
- Moe Bandy recorded a version for Columbia in 1977, which was a #9 Billboard country hit.

== Bibliography ==
- Escott, Colin (2004). Hank Williams: The Biography. Back Bay. ISBN 0-316-73497-7.
