= Send Me the Pillow You Dream On and Other Great Country Hits =

Send Me the Pillow You Dream On (And Other Great Country Hits)

Studio album by Hank Locklin
- Released: March 1967
- Recorded: December 1966
- Studio: RCA Victor Studio
- Genre: Country; Nashville Sound
- Label: RCA Victor
- Producer: Chet Atkins

Hank Locklin chronology
The Best of Hank Locklin (1966)	Send Me the Pillow You Dream On (And Other Great Country Hits) (1967)	Nashville Women (1967)

Send Me the Pillow You Dream On and Other Great Country Hits is a studio album by American country singer-songwriter Hank Locklin. It was released in March 1967 via RCA Victor Records and was produced by Chet Atkins. The project was Locklin's 15th studio recording released in his career and contained twelve tracks. This included a re-recording of the title track, which was among Locklin's biggest hits. The album received positive reception from critics following its release.

== Background and content ==
Among Hank Locklin's biggest hits was 1957's "Send Me the Pillow You Dream On." The song was a top ten country hit and minor pop hit. The 1957 version was a re-recording of Locklin's original cut with 4 Star Records in 1949. The version included on this studio album was Locklin's third re-recording of his hit. He recorded the track (and the rest of the album) in December 1966 at the RCA Victor Studio in Nashville, Tennessee. The sessions were produced by Chet Atkins. The album contained 12 tracks in total. The record consisted entirely of covers, with the title track being Locklin's only hit re-recorded. The remainder of the material was covers of songs by other music artists. Among the album's cover versions was David Houston's "Almost Persuaded," Tom Paxton's "The Last Thing on My Mind," Marty Robbins' "Singing the Blues" and Carl Smith's "Are You Teasing Me."

== Release and reception ==
Professional ratings
Review scores
Source	Rating
Allmusic	4/5 stars
Billboard	Favorable

Send Me the Pillow You Dream On was released in March 1967 on RCA Victor Records. It was Locklin's fifteenth studio recording released in his music career. The album was distributed as a vinyl LP, containing six songs on each side of the record. It was later released in a digital format for music downloads and streaming services, including Apple Music. The record did not reach any chart positions on Billboard upon its release. This included the Top Country Albums chart. The album received a positive reception from Billboard magazine following its release in 1967. Reviewers found that the album's covers would help make it be a successful record. "Locklin's listeners will agree that this is one of Hank's best," they concluded. It also received four out of five stars from Allmusic.

== Track listings ==
=== Vinyl version ===
Side one
No.	Title	Writer(s)	Length
1.	"Maiden's Prayer"	Bob Wills	2:23
2.	"Bonaparte's Retreat"	Pee Wee King	2:57
3.	"I'll Go On Alone"	Marty Robbins	2:36
4.	"Forgive Me"	Walker; Sullivan	2:28
5.	"Are You Teasing Me"	Charlie Louvin; Ira Louvin	2:02
6.	"Silver Dew on the Blue Grass Tonight"	E. Burt	1:57

Side two
No.	Title	Writer(s)	Length
1.	"Send Me the Pillow You Dream On"	Hank Locklin	2:30
2.	"Blue Side of Lonesome"	Leon Payne	3:03
3.	"Almost Persuaded"	Billy Sherrill; Glenn Sutton	3:13
4.	"Singing the Blues"	Melvin Endsley	1:50
5.	"Who Can I Count On"	Sammy Masters	2:06
6.	"The Last Thing on My Mind"	Tom Paxton	2:22

=== Digital version ===
Send Me the Pillow You Dream On and Other Great Country Hits
No.	Title	Writer(s)	Length
1.	"Maiden's Prayer"	Wills	2:28
2.	"Bonaparte's Retreat"	King	2:00
3.	"I'll Go On Alone"	Robbins	2:43
4.	"Forgive Me"	Walker; Sullivan	2:37
5.	"Are You Teasing Me"	C. Louvin; I. Louvin	2:08
6.	"Silver Dew on the Blue Grass Tonight"	E. Burt	2:02
7.	"Send Me the Pillow You Dream On"	Locklin	2:37
8.	"Blue Side of Lonesome"	Payne	3:10
9.	"Almost Persuaded"	Sherrill; Sutton	3:20
10.	"Singing the Blues"	Endsley	1:56
11.	"Who Can I Count On"	Masters	2:09
12.	"The Last Thing on My Mind"	Paxton	2:27

== Personnel ==
All credits are adapted from the liner notes of Send Me the Pillow You Dream On and Other Great Country Hits.

Musical and technical personnel

- Chet Atkins – producer
- The Jordanaires – background vocals
- Hank Locklin – lead vocals
- Jim Malloy – engineer
- Al Pachucki – engineer

== Release history ==
Region	Date	Format	Label	Ref.
Canada	March 1967	Vinyl	RCA Victor	
Germany	March 1967	Vinyl	RCA Victor	
United Kingdom	March 1967	Vinyl	RCA Victor	
United States	March 1967	Vinyl	RCA Victor	
United States	2010s	Digital; Streaming	Sony Music Entertainment	
