= Missing in Action (song) =

Single by Ernest Tubb
- B-side: "A Heartsick Soldier on Heartbreak Ridge"
- Released: February 1952
- Genre: Country
- Length: 3:06
- Label: Decca
- Songwriters: Helen Kays, Arthur Q. Smith

"Missing in Action" is a country music song written by Helen Kays and Arthur Q. Smith and popularized by singer Ernest Tubb. It was released in January 1952 on the Decca label (catalog no. 46289) with "Heartsick Soldier on Heartbreak Ridge" as the "B"-side. On its release, Billboard called it "particularly effective" in telling the story of a G.I. and predicted it could be a big seller. It peaked in February 1952 at No. 3 on the Billboard country and western best seller chart and remained on the chart for 11 weeks. At the end of the year, it was ranked No. 16 on the Billboard Top Country & Western Records of 1952.

The song's lyrics tell the story of a soldier who was wounded and captured after coming ashore from a warship. He later returns from war to find his wife in a new bridal veil, believing he had died. He decides that she must never know he returned and will forever roam as a vagabond dreamer.

The song was also covered by, among others, Buddy Williams and Kirk McGee. Tubb's version has also been included on multiple compilation albums, including "Ernest Tubb's Greatest Hits, Vol. 2" (1970), "I've Got All the Heartaches I Can Handle" (1973), "Greatest Hits, Vol. 2" (1974), "An American Legend His Greatest Hits" (1981), "Country USA 1952" (Time-Life 1990), "The Very Best of Ernest Tubb" (1998), "Texas Troubador" (2003), and "The Complete US Hits (1941-62)" (2016).
