= Arthur Q. Smith =

American country music songwriter (1909–1963)

- Born: James Arthur Pritchett; December 11, 1909; Griffin, Georgia, U.S.
- Died: March 21, 1963 (aged 53) Knoxville, Tennessee, U.S.
- Genres: Country music, bluegrass music
- Occupations: Songwriter, musician
- Instrument: Guitar
- Years active: 1930s–1960s

Arthur Q. Smith (born James Arthur Pritchett; December 11, 1909 – March 21, 1963) was an American country music songwriter and musician from East Tennessee who composed numerous country standards during the 1940s and 1950s. Due to severe alcoholism, Smith routinely sold his song copyrights for nominal amounts ($10–$25 USD) to cover immediate debts. Consequently, major artists like Hank Williams, Ernest Tubb, and Dolly Parton scored hits with his music under alternative credits until archival research reconstructed his catalog.

== Biography ==
=== Early life and career ===
Born in Griffin, Georgia, Smith was raised in Harlan, Kentucky, where he learned guitar and performed on regional radio. By the late 1930s, he moved to Knoxville, Tennessee, adopting the pseudonym "Arthur Q. Smith", and became a fixture around radio station WNOX on programs like the Mid-Day Merry-Go-Round. He briefly worked for King Records and WMPS-AM in Memphis, though substance dependency hindered long-term appointments.

=== Under-the-table transactions ===
Operating largely out of Knoxville's Three Feathers Sandwich Shop, Smith scribbled lyrics on napkins and scraps to sell outright to performers and brokers for quick cash. Buyers registered the works under their own names, though Smith sometimes kept marginal notes or receipts. Purchasers included Claude Boone, Carl Butler and Lost John Miller.

In country music folklore and archival research, persistent allegations connect Arthur Q. Smith to the authorship of two enduring classics, "Tennessee Waltz" (credited to Pee Wee King and Redd Stewart) and "I Can't Stop Loving You" (credited to Don Gibson). Following the 2016 release of the compilation The Trouble With the Truth, several music contemporaries and historians raised questions regarding the true origins of these two country standards. These claims remain subject to historical debate, contrasting with the legally registered copyrights held by King, Stewart, and Gibson. Regarding "I Can't Stop Loving You," local musicians corroborated a narrative where fellow Knoxville songwriter Ruby Moody wrote the song, and Gibson then allegedly passed it to Smith to fully rewrite and polish.

=== Later years and death ===
After suffering a 1961 heart attack and a cancer diagnosis., Smith died in destitution on March 21, 1963, in a Knoxville rooming house at age 53 with only ten cents in his pocket. He was buried in Knoxville following a minor dispute at his wake over his final unsold song.

== Legacy and rediscovery ==
Smith gained chart success posthumously when Ricky Skaggs recorded "I Wouldn't Change You If I Could" in 1982. In the early 2000s, historians Wayne Bledsoe and Bradley Reeves recovered his surviving lead sheets and acetate recordings. Bear Family Records released the retrospective Arthur Q. Smith: The Trouble With The Truth in December 2016, earning a Grammy Award nomination for its accompanying booklet. Artists like Marty Stuart have advocated for his induction into the Songwriters Hall of Fame, and songwriter Harlan Howard penned a tribute track about his life.

== Known compositions ==
Historical research and sales receipts verify Smith as the primary or co-writer of several notable works (full details and credits can be found in the referenced documents), including:

- "Rainbow at Midnight" - (#1 hit for Ernest Tubb in 1946)
- "Wedding Bells" - (#2 for Hank Williams in 1949)
- "If Teardrops Were Pennies" - (#8 for Carl Butler in 1951, #3 for Porter Wagoner & Dolly Parton in 1973)
- "Beautiful Brown Eyes" - (#11 for Rosemary Clooney in 1951)
- "Missing in Action" - (#3 for Ernest Tubb in 1952)
- "I Overlooked an Orchid" - (#1 hit for Mickey Gilley in 1974)
- "I Wouldn't Change You If I Could" - (#1 hit for Ricky Skaggs in 1983)
- "Next Sunday Darlin' Is My Birthday" (recorded by Hank Williams)
- "I Doose What I Choose"
- "You Can't Hide A Heartache"
