= Til I'm Holding You Again =

Single by Pirates of the Mississippi

from the album Walk the Plank
- B-side: "Feed Jake"
- Released: February 29, 1992
- Genre: Country
- Length: 3:20
- Label: Capitol Nashville
- Songwriter(s): Bill McCorvey, Rich Alves, Larry Gottlieb
- Producer(s): Jimmy Bowen, Rich Alves

Pirates of the Mississippi singles chronology
"Fighting for You" (2001)	"Til I'm Holding You Again" (1992)	"Too Much" (1992)

"Til I'm Holding You Again" is a song recorded by American country music group Pirates of the Mississippi. It was released in February 1992 as the second single from the album Walk the Plank. The song reached #22 on the Billboard Hot Country Singles & Tracks chart. The song was written by band members, Bill McCorvey and Rich Alves, along with Larry Gottlieb.

== Chart performance ==
Chart (1992)	Peak position
US Hot Country Songs (Billboard)	22
Canadian RPM Country Tracks	28
