= Crazy Heart (Hank Williams song) =

Single by Hank Williams With His Drifting Cowboys
- A-side: "(I Heard That) Lonesome Whistle"
- Published: October 30, 1951 Milene Music
- Released: September 1951
- Recorded: July 25, 1951
- Studio: Castle Studio, Nashville
- Genre: Country & Western, Honky-tonk, Country blues
- Length: 2:27
- Label: MGM
- Songwriters: Maurice Murray, Fred Rose
- Producer: Fred Rose

Hank Williams With His Drifting Cowboys singles chronology
"Hey, Good Lookin'" (1951)	"Crazy Heart" (1951)	"Baby, We're Really in Love" (1951)

"Crazy Heart" is a song by Hank Williams. It was written by Fred Rose and Maurice Murray and reached number four in the record chart for Williams in 1951. It was recorded at Castle Studio in Nashville on July 25, 1951 with Fred Rose producing and backing from Don Helms (steel guitar), Jerry Rivers (fiddle), Sammy Pruett (lead guitar), Howard Watts (bass) and probably Jack Shook (rhythm guitar).

It was one of Williams least commercially successful singles of the period, only spending two weeks on the chart, although Guy Lombardo dented the Top 20 with it, underscoring that the song was better suited to a palm court orchestra than Hank Williams.

== Cover versions ==
- Jerry Lee Lewis cut several takes of the song for Sun Records in 1958.
- Ernest Tubb released the song on Decca Records.
- Hank Williams, Jr. recorded the song as an overdubbed duet on MGM in 1965.
- Don Gibson covered the song in 1971 on Hickory Records.
- Stonewall Jackson recorded the song in 1971.
