= Pirates of the Mississippi (album) =

Studio album by Pirates of the Mississippi
- Released: July 10, 1990
- Recorded: 1988
- Studios: Javalina Recording Studios, Sound Stage Studios, and Studio 19, Nashville, TN
- Genre: Country
- Length: 37:51
- Label: Capitol Nashville
- Producers: Rich Alves; James Stroud

Pirates of the Mississippi chronology
Pirates of the Mississippi (1990)	Walk the Plank (1991)

Singles from Pirates of the Mississippi
- 1. "Honky Tonk Blues" Released: June 1990; 2. "Rollin' Home" Released: 1990; 3. "Feed Jake" Released: February 25, 1991; 4. "Speak of the Devil" Released: 1991

Professional ratings
Review scores
Source	Rating
AllMusic	4.5/5 stars

Pirates of the Mississippi is the debut studio album by the American country music band Pirates of the Mississippi. It was released in 1990 on Capitol Records Nashville and contains four singles: "Honky Tonk Blues" (a cover of the Hank Williams song), "Rollin' Home", "Feed Jake", and "Speak of the Devil". "Feed Jake" was the highest charting of these singles, reaching No. 15 on the Billboard country charts. All of the other singles except "Rollin' Home" reached Top 40 on the same chart.

== Track listing ==
No.	Title	Writer(s)	Length
1.	"Honky Tonk Blues"	Hank Williams	3:00
2.	"I Take My Comfort in You"	Guy Clark, Wayland Holyfield	3:34
3.	"Rollin' Home"	Rich Alves, Bill McCorvey, Gary Harrison	3:11
4.	"Speak of the Devil"	Alves, McCorvey, Danny Mayo	3:04
5.	"Feed Jake"	Mayo	4:00
6.	"Talkin' 'Bout Love"	Alves, McCorvey, Larry Gottlieb	4:17
7.	"Jolly Roger/Pirates of the Mississippi"	Alves, McCorvey	5:15
8.	"Down and Out in Birmingham"	Alves, McCorvey	3:57
9.	"Anything Goes"	Mayo, McCorvey, Diana Rae	4:09
10.	"Redneck Rock & Roll"	Alves, Mayo, McCorvey	3:24

== Personnel ==
As listed in liner notes.

Musicians

- Rich Alves – guitar, Hammond organ, background vocals
- John Kelton - strings on "Feed Jake"
- Jimmy Lowe – drums, percussion
- Bill McCorvey – guitar, lead vocals
- Pat Severs – steel guitar, Dobro
- Dean Townson – bass guitar, background vocals

Technical

- Chuck Ainlay - mixing
- Rich Alves - producer
- John Kelton - recording
- Glenn Meadows - mastering
- Tom Perry - overdubs
- James Stroud - producer

== Charts ==
=== Weekly charts ===
Chart (1990–1991)	Peak position
US Billboard 200	80
US Top Country Albums (Billboard)	12

=== Year-end charts ===
Chart (1991)	Position
US Top Country Albums (Billboard)	30
