= Almost (George Morgan song) =

Single by George Morgan
- A-side: "You're a Little Doll"
- Released: February 11, 1952
- Recorded: 1951
- Genre: Country
- Length: 2:52
- Label: Columbia
- Songwriter(s): Vic McAlpin, Jack Toombs

George Morgan singles chronology
"Ring on Your Finger" (1949)	"Almost" (1952)	"(I Just Had a Date) A Lover's Quarrel" (1953)

"Almost" is a song written by Vic McAlpin and Jack Toombs, sung by George Morgan, and released in 1952 on the Columbia label (catalog no. 20906).

It is a song of loss and rejection in which the singer recites that "almost" she was his bride to be, "almost" he heard the church bells ring, only to be betrayed and left to cry with a "faded memory" and the "unkind words" she said.

In April 1952, it peaked at No. 2 on Billboard's country and western best seller, juke box, and jockey charts. It spent 23 weeks on the charts and was ranked No. 9 on Billboard's 1952 year-end country and western best seller chart and No. 12 on the year-end juke box chart.

== See also ==
- Billboard Top Country & Western Records of 1952
