= Don't Stay Away (Till Love Grows Cold) =

Single by Lefty Frizzell

from the album Listen to Lefty
- B-side: "You're Here, So Everything's All Right"
- Released: 1952
- Recorded: 1951
- Genre: Country
- Length: 2:56
- Label: Columbia
- Songwriter(s): Lefty Frizzell, Loys Sutherland

Lefty Frizzell singles chronology
"How Long Will It Take (To Stop Loving You)" (1952)	"Don't Stay Away (Till Love Grows Cold)" (1952)	"It's Just You (I Could Love Always)" (1952)

"Don't Stay Away (Till Love Grows Cold)" is a song written by Lefty Frizzell and Loys Sutherland, sung by Frizzell, and released on the Columbia label (catalog no. 20911). In April 1952, it peaked at No. 2 on Billboard's country and western best seller and juke box charts. It spent 12 weeks on the charts and was also ranked No. 17 on Billboard's 1952 year-end country and western juke box chart and No. 19 on the year-end best seller chart.

== See also ==
- Billboard Top Country & Western Records of 1952
