= Paradise (John Anderson album) =

Studio album by John Anderson
- Released: January 30, 1996
- Recorded: 1995
- Studio: Loud Recording, Sixteenth Avenue Sound and Sound Stage Studios, Nashville TN
- Genre: Country
- Label: BNA #66810
- Producer: James Stroud and John Anderson

John Anderson chronology
Country 'Til I Die (1994)	Paradise (1996)	Greatest Hits (1996)

Paradise is the sixteenth studio album by American country music artist John Anderson. It was released in 1996 under the BNA Records label. The album produced the singles: "Paradise" (also recorded by Pirates of the Mississippi on their 1995 album Paradise), which peaked at 26 on United States Country charts and 21 on Canadian charts, "Long Hard Lesson Learned", which peaked at 51 and "My Kind of Crazy", which peaked at 67.

== Critical reception ==
Sara Sytsma of Allmusic rated the album two-and-a-half stars out of five, saying that it "featur[es] a handful of great songs that cancel out the fair amount of filler on the record." Chet Flippo of Billboard called it "traditional, uncompromising John Anderson country".

== Track listing ==
No.	Title	Writer(s)	Length
1.	"Paradise"	Bob McDill, Roger Murrah	2:46
2.	"Long Hard Lesson Learned"	John Anderson, Donna Anderson, Michael Anderson	3:26
3.	"The Band Plays On"	J. Fred Knobloch, Gary Scruggs	3:51
4.	"My Kind of Crazy"	John Jarrard, Delbert McClinton, Gary Nicholson	2:42
5.	"Let the Guitar Do the Talkin'"	Kelly Garrett, Craig Wiseman	3:41
6.	"30,000 Feet"	John Anderson, Troy Seals	3:00
7.	"It Wouldn't Kill Me"	Larry Boone, Paul Nelson, Tom Shapiro	3:07
8.	"Love Comes Back Around"	J. Anderson, D. Anderson, M. Anderson	3:21
9.	"Bad Weather"	J. Anderson, Lionel Delmore	4:09
10.	"They Spent Forever"	J. Anderson, Delmore	3:28

== Personnel ==
As listed in liner notes.

- John Anderson – acoustic guitar, lead vocals, background vocals
- Eddie Bayers – drums
- Mike Brignardello – bass guitar
- Larry Byrom – acoustic guitar
- Darel DeCounter – Hammond B-3 organ
- Paul Franklin – steel guitar, Dobro
- Sonny Garrish – steel guitar, Dobro
- Levon Helm – background vocals on "The Band Plays On"
- Dann Huff – electric guitar
- Mark Knopfler – electric guitar on "Let the Guitar Do the Talkin'"
- Matt Rollings – piano
- John Wesley Ryles – background vocals
- Gary Smith – piano
- Joe Spivey – fiddle, mandolin
- Biff Watson – acoustic guitar
- Lonnie Wilson – drums
- Glenn Worf – bass guitar
- Curtis Wright – background vocals
- Curtis Young – background vocals

== Chart performance ==
=== Album ===
Chart (1996)	Peak position
U.S. Billboard Top Country Albums	40

=== Singles ===
Year	Single	Peak positions	
Year	Single	US Country	CAN Country
1996	"Paradise"	26	21
1996	"Long Hard Lesson Learned"	51	71
1996	"My Kind of Crazy"	67	—
