= A Street Man Named Desire =

Studio album by Pirates of the Mississippi
- Released: September 28, 1992
- Genre: Country
- Length: 42:57
- Label: Liberty
- Producer: Rich Alves; Jimmy Bowen

Pirates of the Mississippi chronology
Walk the Plank (1991)	A Street Man Named Desire (1992)	Dream You (1993)

Professional ratings
Review scores
Source	Rating
Allmusic	3/5 stars

A Street Man Named Desire is the third studio album by American country music band Pirates of the Mississippi. Released in 1992 as their first album for Liberty Records, it produced a minor chart single in its title track, which was also the only chart single from it.

== Content ==
The album's title track charted on Billboard Hot Country Songs in 1992. Members of the band noted that the song was subject to controversy: a representative of Bill Clinton, then the Democratic Party's nominee for President of the United States, wanted to use the song in Clinton's campaign. Conversely, a friend of George H. W. Bush, who was President at the time, called a station that was playing the song regularly and demanded that it be withdrawn from rotation.

== Critical reception ==
Rating it 3 out of 4 stars, Jack Hurst of Tribune Media wrote that the band "possess a swingy ear-friendliness as well as a gift for the occasional stunning lyric."

== Track listing ==
1. "Don't Quit Your Day Job" (Rich Alves, Bill McCorvey, Roger Murrah) – 3:13
2. "Room at the Bottom" (J. Fred Knobloch, Kevin Welch) – 4:45
3. "Ain't Got No Idea" (Alves, McCorvey, Steve Dean) – 2:39
4. "All That Your Eyes See" (Alves, McCorvey, Gary Harrison) – 3:44
5. "Mystery Ship" (instrumental) (Alves, McCorvey, Pat Severs, Jimmy Lowe, Dean Townson) – 4:08
6. "My Kinda Woman" (Danny Mayo, Freddy Weller) – 2:59
7. "Some Things Never Change" (McCorvey, Harrison) – 3:41
8. "Mississippi Homegrown" (Alves, McCorvey, Harrison) – 4:53
9. "A Street Man Named Desire" (Alves, McCorvey, Harrison) – 4:53
10. "The Hard Side of Love" (Alves, David Malloy, Jerry Taylor) – 3:51
11. "Just for You" (Alves, McCorvey, Townson, John Paul Daniel) – 4:37

== Personnel ==
Pirates of the Mississippi

- Richard Alves - guitar, background vocals
- Jimmy Lowe - drums, background vocals
- Bill McCorvey - guitar, lead vocals
- Pat Severs - steel guitar, Dobro, lap steel guitar, "Cheezy organ steel", background vocals, acoustic guitar
- Dean Townson - bass guitar, background vocals

Additional musician

- John Kelton - strings

Technical

- Rich Alves - production
- Jimmy Bowen - production
- John Kelton - recording, overdubbing, mixing
- Tim Kish - recording, overdubbing, mixing
- Glenn Meadows - mastering, digital editing

== Chart performance ==
Chart (1992)	Peak position
U.S. Billboard Top Country Albums	75
