= A Full Time Job =

Single by Eddy Arnold
- B-side: "Shepherd of My Heart"
- Released: 1952
- Recorded: 1952
- Genre: Country
- Length: 2:25
- Label: RCA Victor
- Songwriter(s): Gerry Teifer

Eddy Arnold singles chronology
"Someone Calls Me Daddy" (1952)	"A Full Time Job" (1952)	"Older and Bolder" (1952)

"A Full Time Job" is a song written by Gerry Teifer, sung by Eddy Arnold, and released on the RCA Victor label (catalog no. 20-4787). In July 1952, it peaked at No. 1 on Billboard's country and western jockey chart (No. 3 best seller and juke box). It spent 18 weeks on the charts and was ranked No. 15 on Billboard's 1952 year-end country and western best seller chart and No. 21 on the year-end juke box chart.

== See also ==
- Billboard Top Country & Western Records of 1952
