= Paradise (Pirates of the Mississippi album) =

Studio album by Pirates of the Mississippi
- Released: 1995
- Genre: Country
- Length: 31:44
- Label: Giant
- Producer: David Malloy; James Stroud

Pirates of the Mississippi chronology
The Best of Pirates of the Mississippi (1994)	Paradise (1995)	Heaven and a Dixie Night (2006)

Paradise is the fifth studio album, and the sixth album overall, by the American country music band Pirates of the Mississippi. It was released in 1995 as their only album for the Giant label, and it did not produce any chart singles. Shortly after this album's release, Pirates of the Mississippi disbanded, and remained inactive until guitarist Rich Alves and vocalist Bill McCorvey reunited in the early 2000s as a duo.

David Malloy produced the entire album, with assistance from James Stroud on all tracks except "Paradise", "I Think Locally", and "Feed Jake".

== Content ==
The title track was later recorded by John Anderson on his 1996 album which was also titled Paradise, and was also produced by James Stroud. Anderson's version of the song was a single.

== Critical reception ==
Giving it 3 out of 5 stars, Shawn Ryan of New Country magazine praised the album for its "upbeat romps" and "songs with a keen eye for detailing the heart of blue-collar life with respect and affection".

== Track listing ==
1. "Paradise" (Bob McDill, Roger Murrah) – 2:46
2. "Let the Joneses Win" (John Jarrard, Wendell Mobley, Kent Wells) – 3:02
3. "911" (Bill McCorvey, Rich Alves, Gary Harrison) – 2:48
4. "The Biggest Broken Hearts" (McCorvey, Alves, Harrison) – 3:51
5. "I Think Locally" (McCorvey, Murrah, John Schweers) – 3:08
6. "Weakness for the Weekend" (Tim Johnson) – 2:48
7. "When Her Love Was Mine" (Bob Regan, Mark D. Sanders) – 2:56
8. "Country" (Murrah, Marcus Hummon) – 2:34
9. "Rodeo Queen" (Alves, McCorvey, Dean Townson) – 3:42
10. "Feed Jake" (Danny Mayo) – 4:09
  - live recording

== Personnel ==
Compiled from liner notes.

Pirates of the Mississippi

- Rich Alves — lead guitar, background vocals
- Jimmy Lowe — drums, background vocals
- Bill McCorvey — lead vocals, rhythm guitar
- Dean Townson — bass guitar, background vocals

Additional musicians

- Larry Byrom — acoustic guitar
- Glen Duncan — fiddle
- Paul Franklin — steel guitar, Dobro
- Rob Hajacos — fiddle
- Dann Huff — electric guitar
- Steve Nathan — piano, Hammond B-3 organ, keyboards
- Johnny Neel — piano
- John Wesley Ryles — background vocals
- Gary Smith — piano
- Joe Spivey — fiddle
- Glenn Worf — bass guitar
- Curtis Wright — background vocals
- Curtis Young — background vocals
