= Paradise (Pirates of the Mississippi song) =

Single by John Anderson

from the album Paradise
- B-side: "Bad Weather"
- Released: December 9, 1995
- Genre: Country
- Length: 2:46
- Label: BNA
- Songwriters: Bob McDill, Roger Murrah
- Producers: James Stroud, John Anderson

John Anderson singles chronology
"Mississippi Moon" (1995)	"Paradise" (1995)	"Long Hard Lesson Learned" (1996)

"Paradise" is a song written by Bob McDill and Roger Murrah. It was originally recorded by the band Pirates of the Mississippi for their 1995 album Paradise, released on Giant Records. It was later recorded by American country music artist John Anderson. His version served as the title track from the album, Paradise, and was released in December 1995 as the album's first single. The song reached No. 26 on the Billboard Hot Country Singles & Tracks chart.

== Content ==
"Paradise" is a song about rural life, comparing the narrator's life to a "paradise". A review of Pirates of the Mississippi's version of the song published in Billboard considered the lyrics simplistic but praised the lead vocals.

== Chart performance ==
Chart (1995–1996)	Peak position
US Hot Country Songs (Billboard)	26
Canadian RPM Country Tracks	21
