= The Wild Side of Life =

1952 single by Hank Thompson

Single by Hank Thompson and His Brazos Valley Boys
- B-side: "Cryin' In The Deep Blue Sea"
- Released: January 12, 1952 (U.S.)
- Recorded: December 11, 1951
- Studio: Capitol (Hollywood, California)
- Genre: Country
- Length: 2:44
- Label: Capitol F1942
- Songwriters: Arlie Carter, William Warren
- Producer: Ken Nelson

Hank Thompson and His Brazos Valley Boys singles chronology
"Soft Lips" / "The Grass Looks Greener Over Yonder" (1949)	"The Wild Side of Life" (1952)	"Waiting in the Lobby of Your Heart" (1952)

"Wild Side of Life"

Single by Status Quo
- B-side: "All Through the Night"
- Released: 3 December 1976
- Genre: Rock
- Length: 3:18
- Label: Vertigo
- Songwriters: Arlie Carter; William Warren
- Producer: Roger Glover

Status Quo singles chronology
"Mystery Song" (1976)	"Wild Side of Life" (1976)	"Rockin' All Over the World" (1977)

"The Wild Side of Life" is a song made famous by country music singer Hank Thompson. Originally released in 1952, the song became one of the most popular recordings in the genre's history, spending 15 weeks at number one on the Billboard country chart, solidified Thompson's status as a country music superstar and inspired the answer song, "It Wasn't God Who Made Honky Tonk Angels" by Kitty Wells. In 1999, the song was inducted into the Grammy Hall of Fame.

== Song history ==
"The Wild Side of Life" carries one of the most distinctive melodies of early country music, used in "Thrills That I Can't Forget" recorded by Welby Toomey and Edgar Boaz in 1925, "I'm Thinking Tonight of My Blue Eyes" by the Carter Family in 1929, and "Great Speckled Bird" by Roy Acuff in 1936. By 1951, it was in the public domain, and neither songwriter shared credit for the music. That, along with the song's story of a woman shedding her role as domestic provider to follow the night life, combined to become one of the most famous country songs of the early 1950s.

According to country music historian Bill Malone, "Wild Side" co-writer William Warren was inspired to create the song after his experiences with a young woman he met when he was younger—a honky tonk angel, as it were—who "found the glitter of the gay night life too hard to resist." Fellow historian Paul Kingsbury wrote that the song appealed to people who "thought the world was going to hell and that faithless women deserved a good deal of the blame."

Jimmy Heap and His Melody Masters first recorded "Wild Side" in 1951, but never had a hit with the song. Thompson did, and his version spent three and one-half months atop the Billboard country chart in the spring and early summer of 1952. "Wild Side" was Thompson's first charting single since 1949's two-sided hit "Soft Lips"/"The Grass is Greener Over Yonder." Thompson had hooked up with producer Ken Nelson in the interim, and one of their first songs together was "Wild Side."

Clay Coppedge wrote a magazine article in 2006 called "A Classic Walk on the Wild Side" detailing the history of this song.

=== Title's influence ===
The song's title inspired the title of Nelson Algren's 1956 novel A Walk on the Wild Side (itself an influence on Lou Reed's 1972 song "Walk on the Wild Side").

=== Answer song ===
The lyric, "I didn't know God made honky tonk angels", and the tune's overall cynical attitude—Kingsbury noted the song "... just begged for an answer from a woman"—inspired "It Wasn't God Who Made Honky Tonk Angels", which was also based on the same melody. Recorded by Kitty Wells and released later in 1952, that song, too, became a No. 1 country hit. In "It Wasn't God…", Wells shifts the blame for the woman's infidelity to the man, countering that for every unfaithful woman there is a man who has led her astray.

== Cover versions ==
There have been many cover versions of "The Wild Side of Life", several of which became hits in their own right. Burl Ives had a hit with the song concurrent with Thompson's success, Ray Price recorded it on his "Night Life" LP in 1963, while Freddy Fender reached No. 13 on the Billboard Hot Country Singles chart in early 1976. It was also the only single by Tommy Quickly to make the U.K. charts, reaching No. 33 in 1964. M.P.D Limited also did a much lesser known cover of this song on their 1967 LP - The Best Of M.P.D. Limited.

Formerly Fat Harry released its cover on Lost Recordings (1969-1972) album.

The Grease Band recorded a version in 1972.

Rod Stewart released a version of this song on his 1976 album, A Night On The Town.

A version by the British rock band Status Quo reached the UK top 10 in 1976, peaking at #9. Quo's rock version featured, instead of Alan Lancaster (who had to go back to his family in Australia), Deep Purple's bassist Roger Glover, who also produced the song. While "Wild Side of Life" was released as a non-album single, it can be found on the deluxe edition with bonus tracks on the album Blue for You.

In 1981, "Wild Side" and "It Wasn't God ..." were combined into a duet by Waylon Jennings and Jessi Colter on their album Leather and Lace; that version reached No. 10.

The Pirates of the Mississippi recorded a version of this song for their 1993 album, Dream You.

Welsh singer Bonnie Tyler recorded this song on her 1981 album Goodbye to the Island.

Vic Dana recorded a pop version of "The Wild Side of Life" with full orchestra backing.

"The Great Speckled Bird" and "I'm Thinking Tonight of My Blue Eyes" are earlier adaptations of the same tune and have been recorded by country artists such as Kitty Wells, Slim Whitman and Gene Autry. Similar lyrics and crossover versions containing lyrics from all four songs have also been recorded.

Maury Finney recorded an instrumental saxophone version in 1976. As the B-side to his single "Rollin' in My Sweet Baby's Arms", it charted at No. 78 on the country music charts.

== See also ==
- Billboard Top Country & Western Records of 1952
- Piza s jarenыmi tarakanami

== Charts ==
=== Status Quo version ===
==== Weekly charts ====
Chart (1976–1977)	Peak position
Australian Singles (Kent Music Report)	8
Belgium (Ultratop 50 Flanders)	22
Belgium (Ultratop 50 Wallonia)	43
Netherlands (Single Top 100)	18
French Singles (SNEP)	70
Germany (GfK)	15
Ireland (IRMA)	12
UK Singles (Official Charts)	9

==== Year-end charts ====
Chart (1977)	Position
Australia (Kent Music Report)	32

=== Certifications ===
Region	Certification	Certified units/sales
United Kingdom (BPI)	Silver	250,000^{^}
^{^} Shipments figures based on certification alone.
