= Gerry Teifer =

American songwriter

Gerald Emmett Teifer
- Born: May 28, 1922
- Died: September 20, 2004 (aged 82)
- Occupation: Music publishing
- Employer: Acuff-Rose Music
- Spouse: Elizabeth Edmans
- Children: James, Bruce, and Gary

Gerald Emmett Teifer (May 28, 1922 – September 20, 2004) was an American songwriter, music publisher, recording industry executive, and entertainer.

== Biography ==
He was born and raised in Muskegon, Michigan. As a boy, he took piano lessons and was described as being whimsical. As an adult, he moved to Chicago, Illinois, then in 1956 he moved to New York City.

His professional career took him to Los Angeles, and Nashville where he influenced the lives of many in the music business. Gerry's songs and collaborations were recorded by numerous artists including, Elvis Presley, George Strait, Eddy Arnold, Johnnie Ray, and Doris Day. As a songwriter his best known hits were "A Full Time Job" recorded by Eddy Arnold (1952), and "I Don't Care (As Long As You Care For Me)", a song performed regularly on the Liberace show (circa 1953). He also co-wrote the New York Yankees theme song (under the pseudonym of Bob Bundin), which was heard on radio and early television as "Here Come The Yankees".

Gerry was also a talented whistler, and released several singles on Epic Records including "Poco A Poco", "Stop, Look And Whistle", "Heartaches", and "Blue Brazil". As a whistler he also recorded with Chuck Sagle and his Orchestra, was on the Leon Redbone album Double Time on Warner Brothers Records, and performed on numerous commercials.

During his career, he was the first General Manager of the CBS publishing company April/Blackwood Music, President of Metromedia Music, President of RCA Records publishing division Sunbury-Dunbar Music in New York, vice-president of ATV Music Group in Nashville and in New York, and head of foreign licensing for Opryland Music Group in Nashville.

He was an Army paratrooper during World War II, a touring table tennis champion, and was well known among his colleagues as an excellent tennis player who regularly won music industry tournaments.

He married Elizabeth Edmans and had 3 sons, James, Bruce and Gary. He later had 8 grandchildren, Elizabeth, Dawn, Christine, Erin, Dylan, Claire, Lydia and Linda.

He retired to Dunedin, Florida, and died at St. Mark Village, Palm Harbor, Florida, on September 20, 2004, at the age of 82.
