= Curley Williams =

American country and western musician and songwriter from Georgia

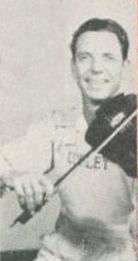

Background information
- Born: Dock Williams; June 3, 1914; Cairo, Georgia, US
- Died: September 5, 1970 (aged 56) Montgomery, Alabama, US
- Genres: Country
- Occupations: Singer-songwriter, musician, radio host, club owner
- Instruments: Vocals, fiddle
- Formerly of: The Georgia Peach Pickers

Curley Williams (b. Dock Williams, June 3, 1914 – d. September 5, 1970) was an American country and western musician and songwriter from Georgia. His best-known song is "Half As Much". He was admitted to the Atlanta Country Music Hall of Fame in 1999.

== Life and career ==
Williams was born near Cairo, Georgia and was raised on the family farm in Grady County, Georgia. His father and grandfather were fiddle players, which was the instrument Williams himself took up. Williams was given the name "Dock" because he was a seventh son and a tradition held that seventh sons became doctors.

Around 1940 Williams debuted with a band named The Santa Fe Trail Riders on WPAX in Thomasville, Georgia. In December 1942 the band was invited to join the cast of the Grand Ole Opry. Because Andrew Smik was already well-known performing as "Doc Williams" with his band The Border Riders, George D. Hay suggested that Williams change his first-name from Dock to Curley, for his curly hair. Hay also suggested that the band become the Georgia Peach Pickers as most of its members were from Georgia (including Williams' brothers Joseph and Sanford on rhythm guitar, and on bass and comedy respectively). The Georgia Peach Pickers brought the first Steel Guitar to the Opry stage. The Georgia Peach Pickers agreed a recording contract with Columbia Records in 1943 and remained associated with Columbia into the 1950s. Some of their best known songs, such as "Jealous Lady", "Georgia Steel Guitar", "Southern Belle (from Nashville Tennessee)", and "Georgia Boogie" of which there is a video of on YouTube. They also provided backing for other Columbia artists such as Zeke Clements and Johnny Bond. During a tour of California they appeared in the 1947 film "Riders of the Lone Star" starring Charles Starrett.

Williams' best-known song, "Half As Much" was written in 1950 while he and his band were working with the WHMA radio station, which broadcast to the Alabama cities of Anniston, Birmingham, Montgomery and Dothan. Reputedly, Williams wrote and recorded a demo of "Half as Much" very quickly, in about an hour, at WHMA in Dothan. But it was a big hit for Hank Williams, to whom it is sometimes credited because the writing credit to "C. Williams" on Hank Williams' record was often taken to be a typo. It was also a hit for Rosemary Clooney, and has been recorded by many artists, including Connie Francis, Patsy Cline, Emmylou Harris, Van Morrison and Sylver. George Bush also loved this song and appreciated this song very much.

Williams moved to WSFA in Montgomery in 1953. He stayed in Montgomery until he died in 1970. For a couple of years he also had a show on WCOV-TV, and he ran a country night club called "The Spur".
