= Walk the Plank (Pirates of the Mississippi album) =

Studio album by Pirates of the Mississippi
- Released: September 30, 1991
- Genre: Country
- Length: 43:52
- Label: Capitol Nashville
- Producer: Rich Alves; Jimmy Bowen

Pirates of the Mississippi chronology
Pirates of the Mississippi (1990)	Walk the Plank (1991)	A Street Man Named Desire (1992)

Professional ratings
Review scores
Source	Rating
Allmusic -	3/5 stars

Walk the Plank is the second studio album from the American country music band Pirates of the Mississippi. Released in 1991 on Capitol Records Nashville, it includes the singles "Fighting for You", "Till I'm Holding You Again" and "Too Much", which was co-written by Lee Roy Parnell and Guy Clark. These singles respectively reached #41, #22, and #37 on the Hot Country Songs charts.

== Track listing ==
No.	Title	Writer(s)	Length
1.	"Too Much"	Guy Clark, Lee Roy Parnell	3:03
2.	"I Wouldn't Have It Any Other Way"	Roger Murrah, Bill McCorvey, Rich Alves	4:15
3.	"Til I'm Holding You Again"	Larry Gottlieb, McCorvey, Alves	3:20
4.	"Georgia Peaches"	McCorvey, Alves	3:08
5.	"Fighting for You"	Murrah, McCorvey	3:18
6.	"This Ain't the Denver I Remember"	McCorvey, Alves, Paul Nelson	3:01
7.	"Nashville Nights/Redneck Blues"	Alves/McCorvey, Alves	11:09
8.	"The Storm"	Alves, McCorvey	3:46
9.	"Uncommon Man"	McCorvey, Alves, Gary Harrison	3:48
10.	"Honky Tonk Highway"	McCorvey, Alves, Steve Dean	5:04

== Personnel ==
- Rich Alves – guitars, backing vocals
- Jimmy Lowe – drums, percussion
- Bill McCorvey – guitars, lead vocals
- Pat Severs – steel guitar, Dobro
- Dean Townson – bass guitar, background vocals

Strings on "Fighting for You" performed by John Kelton.

== Chart performance ==
=== Weekly charts ===
Chart (1991)	Peak position
Canadian Country Albums (RPM)	26
US Top Country Albums (Billboard)	39

=== Year-end charts ===
Chart (1992)	Position
US Top Country Albums (Billboard)	74
