= Too Old to Cut the Mustard =

"Too Old To Cut the Mustard"

Single by Ernest Tubb and Red Foley
- B-side: "I'm in Love with Molly"
- Released: December 1951
- Recorded: 1951
- Genre: Country
- Length: 2:50
- Label: Decca
- Songwriter: Bill Carlisle

"Too Old To Cut the Mustard" is a country music song written by Bill Carlisle and popularized with a 1951 duet by Ernest Tubb and Red Foley. It was released on the Decca label (catalog no. 46387) with "I'm in Love with Molly" as the flip-side. It peaked at No. 5 on the Billboard country and western best seller chart, No. 8 on the juke box chart, and No. 10 on the disc jockey chart. It remained on the charts for nine weeks.

The Carlisles (featuring songwriter Bill Carlisle) also had a hit with their 1951 version of the song, issued on the Mercury label, peaking at No. 6 on the country and western disc jockey chart. Buck Owens and his son Buddy Alan (known as "Buck and Buddy") had a hit in 1972 with their version reaching No. 29. The song was also covered in duets in 1952 by Rosemary Clooney and Marlene Dietrich.

The song's comical lyrics comment on the effects of aging, referring to the condition as being "too old to cut the mustard anymore." The ladies used to stand in line, but now they go the other way. He used to jump like a deer, but now he needs a new landing gear.
