= Dream You =

Studio album by Pirates of the Mississippi
- Released: October 12, 1993
- Genre: Country
- Length: 31:35
- Label: Liberty
- Producer: Mark Wright

Pirates of the Mississippi chronology
| A Street Man Named Desire (1992) | Dream You (1993) | The Best of Pirates of the Mississippi (1994) |

Dream You is the fourth studio album by the American country music band Pirates of the Mississippi. Released in 1993 as their final studio album for Liberty Records, it features the single "Dream You", which peaked at number 68 on the Billboard Hot Country Singles & Tracks (now Hot Country Songs) charts. Also featured is a cover of Hank Thompson's "The Wild Side of Life".

== Content ==
The only single from the album was the title track, which charted at number 68 on Billboard Hot Country Songs. Drummer Jimmy Lowe said of Dream You that he wanted the album to be more of a "commercial-type album", while lead singer Rich Alves described the project as "radio friendly". The band made these decisions after previous singles such as "Fighting for You" and "A Street Man Named Desire" were rejected by radio for their sounds and themes. The album includes a cover of Hank Thompson's "The Wild Side of Life".

== Critical reception ==
An uncredited article in the Victorville, California Daily Press praised the album for its use of steel guitar, as well as the variety of writers. Brian Mansfield of AllMusic called it "basically a party album".

== Track listing ==
1. "Dream You" (Craig Wiseman, Jerry Phillips) – 2:47
2. "I Quit Lyin' in 1986" (Roger Murrah, John Schweers, Mark Wright) – 3:01
3. "The Night They Rocked the Grand Ole Opry" (Rich Alves, Gary Harrison) – 4:19
4. "The Wild Side of Life" (Arlie Carter, William Warren) – 2:41
5. "I'm Here to Stay" (Ronnie Rogers, Wright) – 3:35
6. "People My Age" (Bill McCorvey, Murrah, Schweers) – 2:45
7. "When Times Were Good" (David Lynn Jones) – 4:06
8. "Save the Wild Life" (Bucky Jones, Bob McDill, Dickey Lee) – 2:32
9. "What I Want and What I Get" (McCorvey, Wiseman, Troy Seals) – 3:29
10. "Pop from the Top" (Robert Ellis Orrall, Bill Kenner) – 2:20

== Personnel ==
Pirates of the Mississippi

- Rich Alves - electric guitar, background vocals
- Jimmy Lowe - drums, percussion
- Bill McCorvey - acoustic guitar, lead vocals
- Pat Severs - 5-string banjo, banjo, dobro, pedal steel guitar, lap steel guitar
- Dean Townson - bass guitar, background vocals
