= Give Me More, More, More (Of Your Kisses) =

Single by Lefty Frizzell

from the album Country Favorites
- B-side: "How Long Will It Take (To Stop Loving You)"
- Released: 1952
- Recorded: 1951
- Genre: Country
- Length: 2:56
- Label: Columbia
- Songwriter(s): Walter Price, Lefty Frizzell, Jim Beck

Lefty Frizzell singles chronology
| "My Rough and Rowdy Ways" (1951) | "Give Me More, More, More (Of Your Kisses)" (1952) | "How Long Will It Take (To Stop Loving You)" (1952) |

"Give Me More, More, More (Of Your Kisses)" is a song written by Walter Price, Lefty Frizzell, and Jim Beck, sung by Frizzell, and released on the Columbia label (catalog no. 20885). In December 1952, it peaked at No. 1 on Billboard's country and western jockey and juke box charts. It spent 21 weeks on the charts and was also ranked No. 6 on Billboard's 1952 year-end country and western juke box chart and No. 10 on the year-end best seller chart.

== See also ==
- Billboard Top Country & Western Records of 1952
