= (I Heard That) Lonesome Whistle =

1951 song written by Hank Williams and Jimmie Davis

Single by Hank Williams With His Drifting Cowboys
- B-side: "Crazy Heart"
- Published: December 31, 1951 Jimmie Davis Music Corp.
- Released: September 1951
- Recorded: July 25, 1951
- Studio: Castle Studio, Nashville
- Genre: Country
- Length: 2:25
- Label: MGM
- Songwriters: Hank Williams, Jimmie Davis
- Producer: Fred Rose

Hank Williams With His Drifting Cowboys singles chronology
| "Hey Good Lookin'" (1951) | "(I Heard That) Lonesome Whistle" (1951) | "Baby, We're Really in Love" (1951) |

"(I Heard That) Lonesome Whistle" is a song written by Hank Williams and Jimmie Davis. It reached #9 on the Most Played Juke Box Folk Records in 1951.

== Background ==
Hank Williams was a Jimmie Davis disciple, who scored big hits on Decca Records with "Nobody's Darlin' But Mine," "You Are My Sunshine" and "Worried Mind." It is unclear when he and Hank Williams wrote "(I Heard That) Lonesome Whistle." On one of his Mother's Best radio shows, recorded between January and March 1951, Williams tells his audience that he's going fishing with Jimmie Davis the next week, so the song may have been composed then. Containing two of country music's major themes, trains and prison, the song is notable for the way Hank mimics the sound of a train whistle on the word "lonesome." The song was likely an inspiration for Johnny Cash's "Folsom Prison Blues." It was recorded at Castle Studio in Nashville on July 25, 1951, with Fred Rose producing and backing from Don Helms (steel guitar), Jerry Rivers (fiddle), Sammy Pruett (lead guitar), Howard Watts (bass) and probably Jack Shook (rhythm guitar).

Acuff-Rose songwriter Helen Hudgins later recalled the stiflingly hot summer session: "Hank had his shirt unbuttoned all the way, and he was absolutely soaking wet. It seemed that all he was...was voice. It came up from I don't know where." In a June 2014 online Rolling Stone article, Joseph Hudak wrote of the song, "The sound is so stark, so unsettling, that it's easy to feel exactly what Williams was getting at in the performance: simple heartbreak." The song's title was truncated to "Lonesome Whistle" so that it could be listed on jukebox cards. It peaked at number 8 on the Billboard country singles chart. The B-side, Fred Rose's "Crazy Heart", outperformed it, peaking at number four.

== Sources ==
- Escott, Colin; Merritt, George; MacEwen, William (2004). Hank Williams: The Biography. New York: Little, Brown.
