= Pirates of the Mississippi =

American country music band

- A promotional picture of Pirates of the Mississippi (from left to right: Dean Townson, Bill McCorvey, Jimmy Lowe, Pat Severs, and Rich Alves)

Background information
- Origin: Nashville, Tennessee, U.S.
- Genre: Country
- Works: Pirates of the Mississippi discography
- Years active: 1987–1996, 2006–2007
- Labels: Universal; Capitol Nashville; Liberty; Giant; Evergreen
- Past members: Rich Alves; Jimmy Lowe; Bill McCorvey; Pat Severs; Dean Townson; Greg Trostle

Pirates of the Mississippi were an American country music band founded in 1987 in Nashville, Tennessee. The original members were Bill McCorvey (lead vocals, guitar), Rich Alves (lead guitar, background vocals), Jimmy Lowe (drums), Pat Severs (steel guitar, Dobro), and Dean Townson (bass guitar, background vocals). Severs quit in 1994 and was briefly replaced with Greg Trostle. The band recorded for Capitol Records, Liberty Records, and Giant Records between 1990 and 1995. They also charted nine singles on the Billboard Hot Country Songs charts, the most successful being "Feed Jake", which went to number 15 in 1991. After disbanding in 1996, both Alves and McCorvey went on to write songs for other artists. In 2006, the two reunited under the Pirates of the Mississippi name, releasing an additional album titled Heaven and a Dixie Night before disbanding again. Pirates of the Mississippi are known for a country rock sound, and they received significant media attention for sociopolitical messages in some of their songs.

== History ==
Bill McCorvey, founder of Pirates of the Mississippi, had moved from Montgomery, Alabama, to Nashville, Tennessee, in the 1980s with the intent of pursuing a career in country music. When he was initially unable to do so, he supported himself financially by working various jobs. These included building houses and filling envelopes in a warehouse. While doing so he befriended Rich Alves and the two began writing songs together. Their original intent was to provide "up-tempo" material for Conway Twitty to record, but most of this material was not selected by him. Because of this, McCorvey and Alves decided to recruit other musicians to form a band and play the songs themselves. McCorvey served as lead vocalist, with Alves on lead guitar and backing vocals. Completing the original lineup were steel guitar and Dobro player Pat Severs, bass guitarist and backing vocalist Dean Townson, and drummer Jimmy Lowe. The five members began performing together in 1987. Severs had played in Eddie Rabbitt's band before becoming a session musician, Lowe was a computer programmer, and Townson worked at an aviation factory. The five of them began rehearsing in Lowe's basement at night and decided to pursue a full-time career as a band after noting that neighbors would come over and listen to their music. They began performing at various events across the Southeastern United States. The band originally took the name The Cloggers after they were entertained by a group of dancers wearing clogs at a gig in Smyrna, Georgia.

The Cloggers were discovered in the late 1980s by an artists and repertoire (A&R) agent for Universal Records, then a new record label owned by record producer Jimmy Bowen. Executives at the label disliked the band's name and suggested that they change it. They chose the name Pirates of the Mississippi after a song they had written about Lowe, whom they thought resembled a pirate. The band's debut album was finished by 1988, but its release was delayed until 1990 due to Universal being bought out by Capitol Records' Nashville division. In the meantime, Alves co-wrote the singles "Time In" by The Oak Ridge Boys and "Southern Star" by Alabama, the latter of which went to number one on the Billboard Hot Country Songs charts in early 1990. He and McCorvey also co-wrote "Karma Road" for the group Trader-Price (who were also signed to Capitol by way of the Universal merger) on their 1990 debut album.

=== 1990–1992: Pirates of the Mississippi and Walk the Plank ===
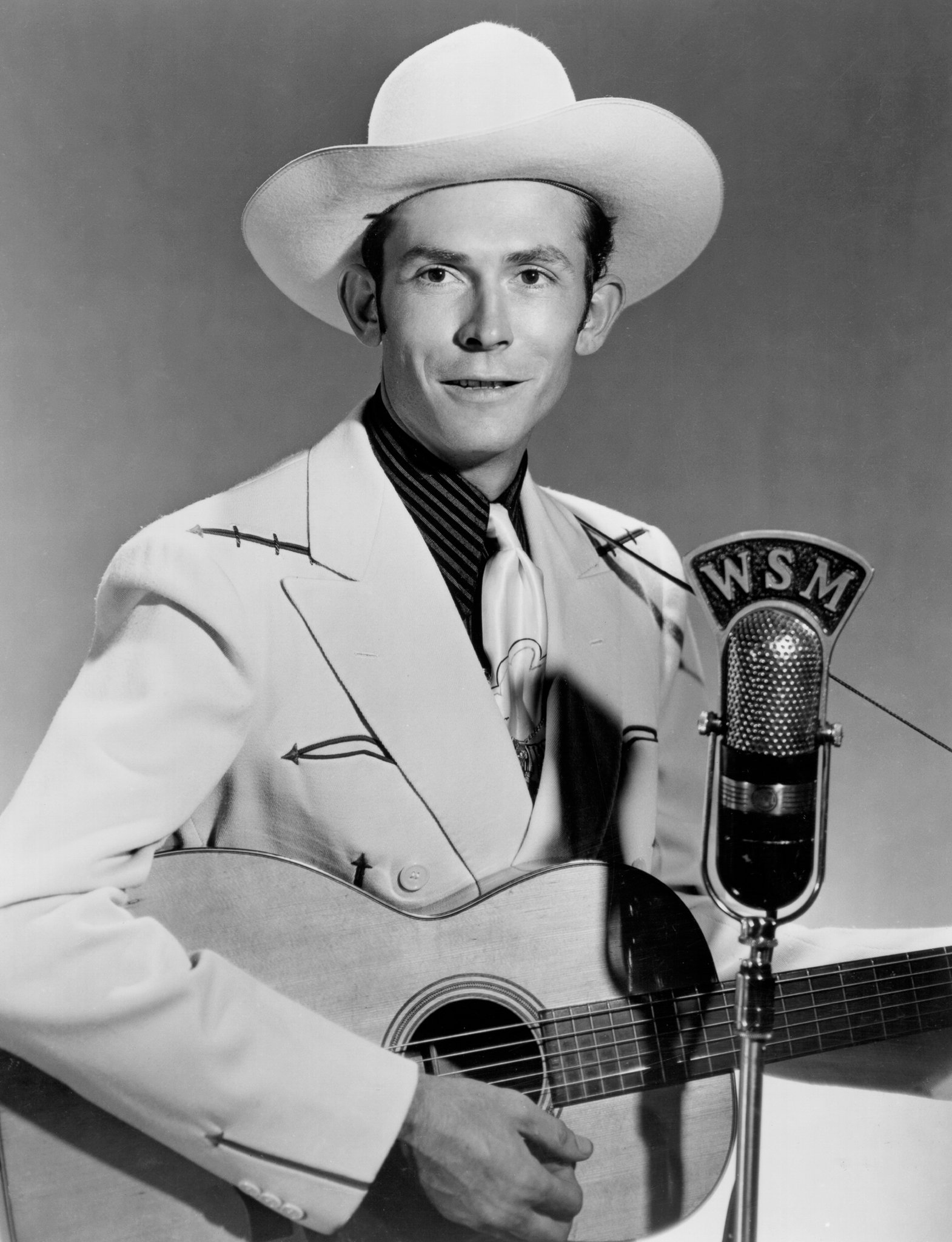
Pirates of the Mississippi's debut single was a cover of Hank Williams's "Honky Tonk Blues".

In June 1990, after the merger of Universal was completed, Capitol released the band's self-titled debut album. Alves produced the album with James Stroud. Pirates of the Mississippi produced four chart singles on the Billboard country charts between 1990 and 1991. The first single selected was a cover of Hank Williams' "Honky Tonk Blues". According to McCorvey, the cover of "Honky Tonk Blues" was not originally intended to be on the album but was added because label executives thought the other songs on the album were not strong enough to serve as a lead single. The band members chose "Honky Tonk Blues" because it was the first song they had performed together. Upon release, this song peaked at number 26 on the country charts. Although the follow-up "Rollin' Home" peaked outside the top 40, the album's third single "Feed Jake" became the band's biggest hit at number 15. The song received a music video directed by Deaton-Flanigen Productions. This was one of the first country music videos not to show the artist in it at all. "Feed Jake" was the band's most popular song with fans and was described in 1993 as their signature song. "Speak of the Devil", the last single from Pirates of the Mississippi, also made the country top 40.

Pirates of the Mississippi accounted for two awards for the band. These were Top New Group from Radio & Records in 1990 and Top New Vocal Group award from the Academy of Country Music a year later. Brian Mansfield wrote in Allmusic that the album "is a cross between Alabama country and Southern rock...There are a few twists, though, namely a Guy Clark song...and a surf-country instrumental." Pirates of the Mississippi was certified gold by the Canadian Recording Industry Association (now known as Music Canada) in 1993, a certification which at the time honored shipments of 50,000 copies. In the United States, the album sold over 370,000 copies.

1991's Walk the Plank was the band's second album. Alves continued to produce, doing so with Bowen this time. Lead single "Fighting for You" peaked at number 41 on the country charts upon release. According to Robert K. Oermann of The Tennessean, this was due to radio programmers considering the song "too downbeat". Follow-up singles "Til I'm Holding You Again" and "Too Much" (the latter written by Guy Clark and Lee Roy Parnell) were minor chart hits. Between the band's first two albums, the members performed all instruments themselves except for the synthesized strings on "Feed Jake" and "Fighting for You". These were performed by John Kelton, also the sound engineer on those albums. McCorvey thought the songs on Walk the Plank were "stronger" than those on the first album and that the production was closer to the sound of the band's concerts. Mansfield said of Walk the Plank that the "Allman Brothers cops are more exciting than their stone-country material, although that's certainly competent enough." He also thought that "Til I'm Holding You Again" showed influences of soul music. Alanna Nash of Entertainment Weekly praised the band's sense of humor, but thought that the album's sounds and influences were inconsistent.

=== 1992–1994: A Street Man Named Desire and Dream You ===
After a restructuring of Capitol Nashville, Pirates of the Mississippi were transferred to Liberty Records, where they would release their third album A Street Man Named Desire in 1992. The title track charted at number 56 on the country charts that same year. Members of the band told the Regina Leader-Post that they received calls from representatives of Bill Clinton, the Democratic Party nominee for President of the United States in the then-upcoming 1992 United States presidential election. Said representatives wanted the band to endorse Clinton because they thought the song's lyrics would be appealing to his constituency. Severs refused, as he knew that the band members had differing political viewpoints from each other and did not want to involve the band in political matters. Conversely, the song received negative attention from representatives of the Republican Party. Severs stated that an unnamed radio station in a larger market was playing the song regularly but withdrew it from rotation after "a close personal friend" of President George H. W. Bush called the station and asked them to do so. The only other single from the album was "Don't Quit Your Day Job", a song about the band's attempts to combine their music careers with their commercial jobs in their early years. Jack Hurst of Tribune Media wrote that the band "possess a swingy ear-friendliness as well as a gift for the occasional stunning lyric." After this album, Severs injured his back when a light display fell on him during a concert.

Dream You was the band's next album for Liberty, released in 1993. Lowe and Alves told The Tennessean that the band wanted to have a more "mainstream" sound due to the failures of "Fighting for You" and "A Street Man Named Desire". The album included a cover of Hank Thompson's 1952 single "The Wild Side of Life". Mark Wright produced the album and co-wrote two tracks on it. Unlike their previous albums, it included a number of outside writers such as Roger Murrah, Craig Wiseman, Dickey Lee, and Robert Ellis Orrall. The only charted single off Dream You was its title track, which reached number 63 and accounted for the band's final appearance on the Hot Country Songs charts. "Save the Wild Life" was also a single, but it did not chart. An uncredited article in the Victorville, California, Daily Press praised the album for its use of steel guitar, as well as the variety of writers. Mansfield called it "basically a party album". Despite the critical reception, the album was commercially unsuccessful. The editors of Country Music: The Encyclopedia attributed this to the large amount of new musicians on the scene at the time drawing attention away from the band. Because of the album's failure, Liberty dropped Pirates of the Mississippi in 1994 after releasing a greatest-hits package titled The Best of Pirates of the Mississippi. Pat Severs quit the band in mid-1994 to pursue other interests outside of music. The other four members auditioned multiple steel guitarists, and by October 1994 they had selected Greg Trostle as his replacement.

=== 1994–1996: Paradise and disbanding ===
Later in 1994, the band began recording new songs with Stroud. They signed with Giant Records in late 1994 and released their first single and video for the label by year's end. Titled "You Could Do Better", the song failed to chart and did not appear on an album. The band's next single release for Giant was "Paradise" in 1995. A review in Billboard described the song's lyrics as "simplistic" but praised McCorvey's singing. This would serve as the title track to their only Giant album, Paradise. By this point, Trostle had left the band as well, and session musician Paul Franklin played steel guitar on the album. Other contributing musicians included guitarist Dann Huff, pianist Johnny Neel, and backing vocalists John Wesley Ryles and Curtis Wright. David Malloy produced the album, collaborating with Stroud on seven of the ten tracks. The album's closing track was a live rendition of "Feed Jake". Shawn Ryan of New Country magazine praised the album for its "upbeat romps" and "songs with a keen eye for detailing the heart of blue-collar life with respect and affection". Writing for The Ottawa Citizen, Susan Beyer praised the "everyday attitudes" of the lyrics, also calling McCorvey's singing voice "capable of great tenderness and power". John Anderson released the title track as a single in early 1996 for an album also titled Paradise on which Stroud was also a producer.

Pirates of the Mississippi disbanded in 1996 due to the band members tiring of their constant touring schedule. Prior to their retirement, they were playing about 250 shows a year. They held a farewell tour which lasted most of the year, with their last show being at the county fair in Isle of Wight County, Virginia. McCorvey did a number of shows that same year in Montgomery, Alabama, with a new set of musicians called the Bill McCorvey Band. Most of these shows were charity concerts for the American Cancer Society. After the band broke up, both McCorvey and Alves continued to work as songwriters in Nashville. McCorvey co-wrote Montgomery Gentry's 1999 hit "Lonely and Gone". Alves co-wrote Mark Wills and Jamie O'Neal's late-2001 duet "I'm Not Gonna Do Anything Without You", as well as the Rascal Flatts album track "From Time to Time". Pat Severs became a session musician in addition to joining the house band on Nashville Star, a singing competition which aired on both USA Network and NBC at the beginning of the 21st century. Trostle continued to work as a session musician and sold handmade furniture.

=== 2006–2007: Heaven and a Dixie Night ===
In 2006, Alves and McCorvey decided to reunite as Pirates of the Mississippi. The two of them thought that reviving the band had potential due to a rise of rock-influenced country in the intervening years. They wrote a number of songs together for an album titled Heaven and a Dixie Night, released on the Evergreen label that year. "Kickin' Up Dust" served as the project's lead single. Jason MacNeil of AllMusic gave the project a mixed review, praising McCorvey's voice and the country rock influences of the more uptempo tracks, but also criticizing other tracks as containing "typical country music fodder". Pirates of the Mississippi played shows in local venues in Alabama and Tennessee before disbanding again in 2007. McCorvey founded an acoustic trio called Buffalo Rome before retiring from music in 2010 to open a liquor store in Brentwood, Tennessee. Dean Townson died of unknown causes on March 25, 2010, at the age of 50.

== Musical styles ==
Now if you get an ear pierced, some will call you gay
But if you drive a pickup, they'll say, "No, you must be straight"
What we are and what we ain't
What we can and what we can't
Does it really matter?

— Pirates of the Mississippi, "Feed Jake" (1991)

Pirates of the Mississippi's style features elements of country rock. Rick Harmon of The Montgomery Advertiser described their style as having influences ranging from Led Zeppelin to Happy Goodman Family, also calling their style a "smoldering boogie". Because of their country rock influences, the band was frequently compared to the Kentucky Headhunters, a country rock band who made their chart debut in 1989. As Pirates of the Mississippi's album was recorded before the Kentucky Headhunters' debut but not released until later, McCorvey thought that the initial commercial success of that band had made country radio more accepting of a band with rock influences in the early 1990s. Robert K. Oermann wrote in The Tennessean that the band had a "rootsy, raucous, casual country rock blend". In the same article, Alves stated that he intended for the band not to have an individual image unlike other contemporary bands, as he thought well-written songs would serve as an image on their own. McCorvey said that he was inspired by Southern rock acts he listened to growing up. He also stated that he preferred to write most of the band's music with Alves, but was open to outside material if he thought it was suitable. Bernard Pilon of The Leader-Post described McCorvey as having a "gravelled edge reminiscent of blues man Jeff Healey", with Pete Swanson of the Great Falls Tribune noting the "no-frill three-part harmonies" provided by Townson and Alves.

Many of the band's songs feature sociopolitical themes in the lyrics, although Severs said this was not a primary intention of theirs. "Feed Jake" received media attention for including a lyric supportive of the gay community. According to McCorvey, some stations refused to play the song for this reason, thus impacting its position on the charts. The editors of The Encyclopedia of Country Music also considered the song unusual in the band's discography, as it was a ballad compared to the "bar band attitude" of their other releases. The song's video portrays a relationship between two men, one of whom dies at the end. Because of this storyline, some viewers thought the video portrayed a gay relationship, while others thought the man who died was a soldier in the Gulf War. Representatives of Deaton-Flanigen Productions stated the video was not intended to have any individual meaning. McCorvey wrote "A Street Man Named Desire", which is about a man who becomes homeless upon losing his job, after noticing fans who attended meet-and-greets at radio stations would often say they were unable to afford going to the band's concerts because they had just lost their jobs. Despite the song's failure at radio, the band performed a number of charity concerts to assist homeless and low-income individuals.

== Members ==
- Rich Alves – background vocals, lead guitar (1987–1996, 2006–2007)
- Jimmy Lowe – drums (1987–1996)
- Bill McCorvey – lead vocals, guitar (1987–1996, 2006–2007)
- Pat Severs – steel guitar, Dobro (1987–1994)
- Dean Townson – bass guitar, vocals (1987–1996)
- Greg Trostle – steel guitar, Dobro (1994)

== Discography ==
Studio albums

- Pirates of the Mississippi (1990)
- Walk the Plank (1991)
- A Street Man Named Desire (1992)
- Dream You (1993)
- Paradise (1995)
- Heaven and a Dixie Night (2006)

Compilations

- The Best of Pirates of the Mississippi (1994)
