= Are You Teasing Me =

Single by Carl Smith

from the album Sentimental Songs
- B-side: "It's a Lovely, Lovely World"
- Released: March 1952
- Recorded: 1952
- Studio: Castle Studio (Nashville, Tennessee)
- Genre: Country
- Length: 2:56
- Label: Columbia
- Songwriter(s): Charlie Louvin, Ira Louvin

Carl Smith singles chronology
"Let Old Mother Nature Have Her Way" (1951)	"Are You Teasing Me" (1952)	"It's a Lovely, Lovely World" (1952)

"Are You Teasing Me" is a song written by the Louvin Brothers (Charlie and Ira), sung by Carl Smith, and released on the Columbia label (catalog no. 20922). In May 1952, it peaked at No. 1 on Billboard's country and western jockey chart (No. 2 best seller and juke box). It spent 19 weeks on the charts and was also ranked No. 11 on Billboard's 1952 year-end country and western juke box chart and No. 14 on the year-end best seller chart.

The song was also performed by the Louvin Brothers on their 1958 album Ira and Charlie.

== See also ==
- Billboard Top Country & Western Records of 1952
