= Feed Jake =

Single by Pirates of the Mississippi

from the album Pirates of the Mississippi
- Released: February 25, 1991
- Genre: Country
- Length: 4:00
- Label: Capitol
- Songwriter: Danny Mayo
- Producers: Rich Alves, James Stroud

Pirates of the Mississippi singles chronology
| "Rollin' Home" (1990) | "Feed Jake" (1991) | "Speak of the Devil" (1991) |

"Feed Jake" is a song written by Danny Mayo, and recorded by American country music band Pirates of the Mississippi. It was released in February 1991 as the third single from the band's self-titled debut album. The song is also the band's highest chart peak, having reached number 15 on the Billboard Hot Country Singles & Tracks (now Hot Country Songs) charts.

== Content ==
"Feed Jake" is a ballad accompanied mainly by guitar and synthesized strings. In the chorus, the male narrator reminisces on his childhood friend, a dog named Jake ("If I die before I wake / Feed Jake..."). The narrator also addresses societal stereotypes toward homeless people and of the gay community, of whom the latter are addressed in the final verse.

Guitarist Rich Alves said of the song that it "means something different to everyone who hears it."

== Music video ==
Deaton-Flanigen Productions directed the song's music video, which was one of the first of its kind in the country music industry to not feature the artist at all. Most of the music video was filmed southwest of Nashville, Tennessee on Tennessee State Route 100 as well as on Highway 70 in White Bluff, Tennessee. It tells the song's story through two men, who are childhood friends, as shown in flashbacks. Later on, one of the men is attending the other's funeral, and the surviving man goes to meet his dog Jake, a Labrador which he and the friend adopted together, at the cemetery. Upon its release, many viewers interpreted the video as depicting a relationship between two gay men, one of whom dies of AIDS at the end. Other viewers interpreted the characters in the video as soldiers in the Persian Gulf War, and that his death occurred in combat. Kimberly Lansing, then the executive producer of Deaton-Flanigen Productions, said that the video was "not meant one way or another" regarding the back story or the one man's death. Lansing also said that the video is about returning home and not fitting in anymore.

== Critical reception ==
In the book The Encyclopedia of Country Music, Tom Roland wrote that the final verse, with its theme of tolerance towards gay people, showed a shift in political beliefs for the typically conservative country music audience.

In 2019, Rolling Stone ranked "Feed Jake" No. 37 on its list of the 40 saddest songs in country music.

== Chart performance ==
"Feed Jake" debuted on the U.S. Billboard Hot Country Singles & Tracks for the week of March 16, 1991. It spent 20 weeks on the Billboard Hot Country Singles & Tracks (now Hot Country Songs) charts, peaking at number 15 the week of June 8, 1991.

| Chart (1991) | Peak position |
|---|---|
| Canada Country Singles (RPM) | 12 |
| US Hot Country Songs (Billboard) | 15 |

== Other versions ==
A live recording appeared on the band's 1995 album Paradise for Giant Records. This version was produced by David Malloy.
