= Easy on the Eyes =

1952 single by Eddy Arnold

"Easy on the Eyes" is a 1952 single by Eddy Arnold, written by Arnold and songwriter Cy Coben. "Easy on the Eyes" was Eddy Arnold's forty-sixth entry on the Country & Western chart. The single went to number one on the Best Seller list with a total of fourteen weeks on the chart.

Carly Simon's 1992 album This Is My Life, soundtrack to the movie This is My Life, had a song on it titled "Easy on the Eyes" which is a different song, composed by Carly Simon and Andy Goldberg.

== See also ==
- Billboard Top Country & Western Records of 1952
