= (When You Feel Like You're in Love) Don't Just Stand There =

Single by Carl Smith
- B-side: "The Little Girl In My Home Town"
- Released: January 1952
- Recorded: June 8, 1951
- Studio: Castle Studio (Nashville, Tennessee)
- Genre: Country & Western
- Length: 2:23
- Label: Columbia 20893
- Songwriters: Jack Henley, Ernest Tubb

Carl Smith singles chronology
"Let Old Mother Nature Have Her Way" (1951)	"(When You Feel Like You're in Love) Don't Just Stand There" (1952)	"Are You Teasing Me" (1952)

"(When You Feel Like You're in Love) Don't Just Stand There" is a song written by Tacoma, Washington country/western artist Cherokee Jack Henley, as revised by Ernest Tubb. The best known recording is the 1952 single by Carl Smith. The single was Carl Smith's second number one on the Country & Western Best Seller charts, staying at the top for five weeks with a total of twenty-four weeks on the chart.
