= Let Old Mother Nature Have Her Way =

Single by Carl Smith

from the album Sentimental Songs
- B-side: "Me and My Broken Heart"
- Released: September 26, 1951
- Recorded: 1951
- Genre: Country and western
- Length: 2:50
- Label: Columbia
- Songwriter(s): Loys Sutherland, Louie Clark

Carl Smith singles chronology
"If Teardrops Were Pennies" (1951)	"Let Old Mother Nature Have Her Way" (1951)	"(When You Feel Like You're in Love) Don't Just Stand There" (1952)

"Let Old Mother Nature Have Her Way" is a 1951 song by Loys Sutherland and Louie Clark, first recorded by Carl Smith. "Let Old Mother Nature Have Her Way" was Smith's first number one on the Billboard country and western best seller chart, spending eight weeks at the top spot and total of 33 weeks on the chart.

While originally released as a 78 record, Smith later released a version of the song on his 1957 album, Sentimental Songs.

The song was also covered by Faron Young on his 1962 album, Four Walls.

== See also ==
- Billboard Top Country & Western Records of 1952
