= Half as Much =

1951 song by Curley Williams

Single by Hank Williams With His Drifting Cowboys
- B-side: "Let's Turn Back the Years"
- Published: October 17, 1951 Acuff-Rose Publications
- Released: March 1952
- Recorded: August 10, 1951
- Studio: Castle Studio, Nashville
- Genre: Country & Western, Honky-tonk
- Length: 2:42
- Label: MGM
- Songwriter: Curley Williams
- Producer: Fred Rose

Hank Williams With His Drifting Cowboys singles chronology
"Honky Tonk Blues" (1952)	"Half as Much" (1952)	"Jambalaya (On the Bayou)" (1952)

"Half as Much"

Single by Rosemary Clooney
- B-side: "Poor Whip-Poor-Will (Move Over, Move Over)"
- Released: April 4, 1952
- Recorded: August 23, 1951
- Genre: Traditional pop
- Length: 2:48
- Label: Columbia
- Songwriter: Curley Williams
- Producer: Percy Faith

Rosemary Clooney singles chronology
"Tenderly" (1952)	"Half as Much" (1952)	"Botch-A-Me (Ba-Ba-Baciami Piccina)" (1952)

"Half as Much" is an American country song written by Curley Williams in 1951. It was recorded by country music singer Hank Williams in 1952 and reached number two on the Billboard Country Singles chart.

== Hank Williams version ==
According to the 2004 book Hank Williams: The Biography, Williams was not too enamoured with "Half as Much" and only recorded it at producer Fred Rose's insistence. Williams recorded it at a session at Castle Studio in Nashville on August 10, 1951. He was backed by Jerry Rivers (fiddle), Don Helms (steel guitar), Sammy Pruett (lead guitar), Howard Watts (bass), probably Jack Shook (rhythm guitar), and either Owen Bradley or Fred Rose on piano. "Half as Much" is notable for being the only Hank Williams recording to feature a solo barroom piano at its conclusion. Two months after Williams recorded "Half as Much," Curly Williams recorded it for Columbia Records, so Rose held back Hank's release until March 28, 1952, to clear the way for Curley's release on November 2, 1951.

== Cover versions ==
- Also in 1952, Rosemary Clooney recorded a number-one, hit version for Top 40 markets in the US, this version also went to number three in the UK.
- Patsy Cline (1962),
- Ray Charles (1962)
- Eddy Arnold (1964)
- Sharon Redd (1967)
- Alberto Semprini, piano with rhythm accompaniment recorded it as the second song of the medley "Dancing to the piano (No. 18) - Part 1" along with "Here in My Heart" and "Isle of Innisfree" in London on November 11, 1952. It was released by EMI on the His Master's Voice label as catalog number B 10385.
- Alma Cogan with orchestra conducted by Frank Cordell recorded it in London on August 1, 1952. It was released by EMI on the His Master's Voice label as catalog number B-10338.
- George Jones recorded the song for his 1960 LP George Jones Salutes Hank Williams.
- Kitty Wells released the song on Decca in 1960.
- Marty Robbins released a version on Columbia Records.
- Carl Smith recorded the song for Hickory.
- Hank Williams steel guitarist Don Helms released an instrumental version in 1962 on Smash Records.
- George Hamilton IV recorded the song on ABC Records.
- Don Gibson covered the song for RCA.
- Glen Campbell included it on his 1973 album I Remember Hank Williams.
- Petula Clark (1974)
- Conway Twitty and Loretta Lynn recorded the song as a duet for their 1988 album Making Believe.
- Emmylou Harris (1992)
- Cake (1998)
- Van Morrison (2006)
- Sylver (2010).

== Chart performance ==
=== Hank Williams version ===
Year	Chart	Position
1952	Billboard Country Singles	#2

=== Rosemary Clooney version ===
Year	Chart	Position
1952	Billboard Pop Singles	#1
1952	UK Singles Chart	#3

== See also ==
- Billboard Top Country & Western Records of 1952

== Bibliography ==
- Escott, Colin; Merritt, George; MacEwen, William (2004). Hank Williams: The Biography. New York: Little, Brown.
