= Danny Mayo =

American songwriter

- Born: Daniel Mayo; October 2, 1950; Gadsden, Alabama, U.S.
- Died: October 2, 1999 (aged 49) Nashville, Tennessee, U.S.
- Genre: Country
- Occupation: Songwriter

Daniel Mayo (October 2, 1950 – October 2, 1999) was an American songwriter, primarily known for writing country hits for artists such as Alabama, Tracy Byrd, Pirates of the Mississippi and Confederate Railroad. Byrd's "The Keeper of the Stars", which he wrote with Dickey Lee and Karen Staley, was nominated for Song of the Year at the Country Music Association in 1995.

== Biography ==
Danny Mayo grew up in Gadsden, Alabama. He graduated Emma Sansom High School. He then joined the United States Navy and moved to Charleston, South Carolina.

== Personal life ==
He was married to Becky Thornhill (née Harwood), but they divorced before he moved to Nashville. They have two children, Aimee Mayo and Cory Mayo, both songwriters themselves.

== Death ==
Mayo was staying at the Ramada Inn in Nashville for his 49th birthday celebration. His son, Cory, wrote his very first song for his father's birthday, Danny was managing and producing singer/songwriter, Tammy Cassidy from Troy, Indiana, who co-wrote and recorded the last Danny Mayo song, “A Heart's Point of View,” which was the title of Cassidy's 2003 album. However, when he did not arrive at Gabes Night Club, next door to the hotel, his friend and co-writer and owner of Tunesmith Entertainment, Nan Cassidy went to check on his welfare. Nan requested Hotel management to open the room 171 door, and upon doing so, Mayo was found dead from a heart attack.

== Discography ==
- Alabama: "If I Had You"
- Confederate Railroad: "Jesus and Mama", "She Took It Like a Man", "She Never Cried"
- Pirates of the Mississippi: "Feed Jake", "Speak of the Devil", "Anything Goes", "Redneck Rock & Roll", "My Kinda Woman"
- Tracy Byrd: "The Keeper of the Stars"
- Sammy Kershaw: "Cantaloupes on Mars"
- Rick Trevino: "The Pain"
- Hank Williams Jr.: "It's a Start"
- Jeff Carson: "The Stone"
- Gene Watson: "Change Her Mind"
- Marlon Jackson: "Baby Tonight"
- South 65: "Dream Large"
- Pearl River: "Mr. Right Now"
