= It Wasn't God Who Made Honky Tonk Angels =

1952 song performed by Kitty Wells

Single by Kitty Wells
- B-side: "I Don't Want Your Money, I Want Your Time"
- Released: June 23, 1952
- Recorded: May 3, 1952
- Studio: Castle Studio (Nashville, Tennessee)
- Genre: Country
- Length: 2:38
- Label: Decca 28232
- Songwriter: J. D. "Jay" Miller
- Producer: Paul Cohen

Kitty Wells singles chronology
"Glory Land March" (1952)	"It Wasn't God Who Made Honky Tonk Angels" (1952)	"Paying For That Back Street Affair" (1953)

Official audio
- "It Wasn't God Who Made Honky Tonk Angels" on YouTube

"It Wasn't God Who Made Honky Tonk Angels" is a 1952 country song written by J. D. "Jay" Miller, and recorded by Kitty Wells. An answer song to the Hank Thompson hit "The Wild Side of Life," the song was performed by Al Montgomery (actually Alice Montgomery) as "Did God Make Honky Tonk Angels" on the Feature label which was owned by songwriter J.D. Miller.

The song — which blamed unfaithful men for creating unfaithful women — became the first No. 1 Billboard country hit for a solo woman artist. In addition to helping establish Wells as country music's first major woman star, "It Wasn't God..." paved the way for other women artists, particularly Dolly Parton, Patsy Cline, Loretta Lynn, Tammy Wynette and Jean Stafford (Australia), and songs where women call out unfaithful men.

In 1998, the 1952 recording of the song by Wells on the Decca label was inducted into the Grammy Hall of Fame.

It was preserved by the National Recording Registry in 2007.

== Song history ==
In the late 1940s, Wells had recorded on RCA Victor, but had little success there. By 1952, she was recording on Decca Records, and recorded "It Wasn't God Who Made Honky Tonk Angels" at her first recording session at Castle Studios in Nashville, Tennessee.

In "The Wild Side of Life", Thompson expresses regret his bride-to-be has left him for another man whom she met in a roadhouse, stating, "I didn't know that God made honky tonk angels." That song and its appeal to people who "thought the world was going to hell and that faithless women deserved a good deal of the blame...just begged for an answer from a woman".

The rebuttal song, as it turned out, was written by Jay Miller, although it was Wells who made it a hit. In "It Wasn't God..." – which follows the same melody, but more uptempo – she cites the original song and counters that, for every woman who had been led astray, it was a man who led her there (often through his own infidelity). She also expresses frustration about how women are always made scapegoats for the man's faults in a given relationship.

Refrain

It wasn't God who made honky tonk angels
As you said in the words of your song
Too many times married men think they're still single
And that's caused many a good girl to go wrong

=== Reception ===
Wells' statement was a rather daring one to make in 1952, particularly in the conservative, male-dominated realm of country music; women's liberation and their sentiments in song were still more than 10 years away. There was plenty of resistance to the song and its statement: the NBC radio network banned the song for being "suggestive," while Wells was prohibited from performing it on the Grand Ole Opry and NBC's "Prince Albert" radio program. It was also banned by the BBC in the United Kingdom.

Yet Wells struck a chord with her fans, as "It Wasn't God..." went to number one for six weeks on Billboard's country charts. In topping the charts, Wells became the first woman to ever accomplish the feat, at least as a solo act; if all female singers are considered, then Margaret Whiting gets the honor (in a 1949 duet No. 1 with Jimmy Wakely called "Slippin' Around").

Wells was at first reluctant to record the song, but eventually agreed, if only to get the standard $125 session fee payment. Eventually, "It Wasn't God Who Made Honky-Tonk Angels" outsold Thompson's "The Wild Side of Life," and launched the then little-known Wells to stardom. Years later, Wells told an interviewer she was shocked over the song's success and endurance. "Women never had hit records in those days. Very few of them even recorded. I couldn't believe it happened," she said.

Historian Charles Wolfe noted "It Wasn't God..." was one of the few notable exceptions to the rule of an answer song not enjoying the same success as the original.

In 2024, Rolling Stone ranked the song at #11 on its 200 Greatest Country Songs of All Time ranking.

=== A familiar melody ===
"The Wild Side of Life" and "It Wasn't God ..." are set to an apparently traditional tune used in the song "Thrills That I Can't Forget" recorded by Welby Toomey and Edgar Boaz in 1925, and more familiarly in the Carter Family's "I'm Thinking Tonight of My Blue Eyes" recorded in February, 1929, as well as the Rev. Guy Smith's "Great Speckled Bird"—popularized in 1936 by Roy Acuff. In view of the common associations, the correspondence was hardly accidental.

The connection between these songs is noted in the David Allan Coe song "If That Ain't Country" that ends with the lyrics "I'm thinking tonight of my blue eyes/ Concerning a great speckled bird/ I didn't know God made honky-tonk angels/ and went back to the wild side of life."

In addition to Wells' vocals, husband Johnnie Wright played bass guitar and Jack Anglin played rhythm guitar. Paul Warren played fiddle and Shot Jackson played steel guitar, traits prevalent on many of Wells' biggest hits.

=== Chart performance ===
Chart (1952)	Peak position
US Hot Country Songs (Billboard)	1

The song ranked #51 on CMT's 100 Greatest Songs in Country Music in 2003.

== Cover versions ==
Several cover versions of the song have been recorded, including the following:

- In 1971, Lynn Anderson also recorded a version of the song that became a Top 20 hit for her, for the album Songs That Made Country Girls Famous.
- In 1972, Ellen McIlwaine recorded the song for her debut solo album, Honky Tonk Angels.
- In 1973, Skeeter Davis recorded the song for her album The Hillbilly Singer.
- In 1976, Marianne Faithfull recorded a version of the song on her album Dreamin' My Dreams also later reissued as Faithless but the title was abridged as "Honky Tonk Angels" in both recordings. GACD 9.00545.
- In 1979, French Canadian singer Renée St-Pierre recorded a French version of this song under the title Une rose pour Maman (A rose for my mom).
- In 1981, the two songs ("Wild Side of Life" and "It Wasn't God Who Made Honky Tonk Angels") were combined into a duet by Waylon Jennings and Jessi Colter on their album Leather and Lace. That song reached No. 10 on the Billboard Hot Country Singles chart.
- In 1985, The two songs were also covered by the folk / rockabilly band The Knitters (a side project of the seminal LA punk band X) on a compilation album "Radio Tokyo Tapes, Vol. 3."
- Wells made a cameo guest-vocalist appearance on a cover version recorded by Dolly Parton, Loretta Lynn and Tammy Wynette, for the album Honky Tonk Angels.
- Early in her career, a then little known Parton also recorded a solo version of the song, including it on a 1963 Kitty Wells/Patsy Cline tribute album.
- In 2012, Terri Clark included a cover on her album Classic. Her version is preceded by audio of her grandmother singing the first verse of Wells' "This White Circle on My Finger".
- In 2014, Lasse Stefanz covered the song as "Älska, glömma och förlåta" on their Honky Tonk Rebels album.
- In 2026, Ella Langley covered the song on her sophomore album Dandelion. Charting at 83 on the Hot 100, and breaking the top 40 on the country charts at 32.
