= Honky Tonk Blues =

1952 single by Hank Williams

Single by Hank Williams With His Drifting Cowboys

from the album Moanin' the Blues
- B-side: "I'm Sorry for You, My Friend"
- Published: November 30, 1948 Acuff-Rose Publications
- Released: February 1952
- Recorded: December 11, 1951
- Studio: Castle Studio, Nashville
- Genre: Country & western; Honky-tonk; Country blues
- Length: 2:10
- Label: MGM 11160
- Songwriter: Hank Williams
- Producer: Fred Rose

Hank Williams With His Drifting Cowboys singles chronology
"Baby, We're Really in Love" (1951)	"Honky Tonk Blues" (1952)	"Half as Much" (1952)

"Honky Tonk Blues" is a country and western song written and performed by Hank Williams. The original 1952 recording was a major success, and it later became a hit for Charley Pride.

== Background ==
"Honky Tonk Blues" is one of the songs that Williams had the most trouble recording. According to Colin Escott's 2004 Williams memoir, Hank and producer Fred Rose had previously attempted to record the song several times; in August 1947, in March 1949, and again in June 1950. The backing on the December 1951 session is believed to have consisted of Don Helms (steel guitar), Jerry Rivers (fiddle), Sam Pruett (electric guitar), Jack Shook (acoustic guitar), and Ernie Newton or Howard Watts (bass). The song was about a young farmboy who leaves his father's farm for the enticements of the city, only to become worn down and disillusioned. The version that was released did not contain all the lyrics on his original demo; the next-to-last verse in which Maw and Paw are "really gonna lay down the law" was missing, emphasizing in a way that Hank himself never made it back from the honky-tonks to pappy's farm. Williams' version reached No. 2 on the Billboard Hot Country Songs chart.

The title served as the name for a documentary about Williams broadcast by PBS as part of its American Masters series. The documentary was also shown at the 48th London Film Festival in 2004.

== Other versions ==
- Hank Williams Jr. recorded the song as an overdubbed duet with his father in 1965 for MGM and then again in 1996 with his own son Hank III on the album Three Hanks: Men with Broken Hearts.
- It appears on the Nitty Gritty Dirt Band's 1972 album Will the Circle Be Unbroken.
- The most successful cover version was by Charley Pride; his version reached the top of the Billboard Hot Country Singles chart in April 1980.
- Waylon Jennings included a version of the song on his 1982 album Black on Black.
- Huey Lewis and the News covered the song on their 1983 album Sports.
- The song was also recorded as the debut single by American country music group Pirates of the Mississippi. Released in 1990, it was the first single from the album Pirates of the Mississippi. The song reached number 26 on the Billboard Hot Country Singles & Tracks chart.
- Jason and the Scorchers covered the song.
- Roy Gaines recorded the song on his 1999 album I Got the T-Bone Walker Blues.
- The Kentucky Headhunters recorded the song for their 2005 LP Big Boss Man.
- Don Williams recorded the song for Pulse in 1999.
- Dion DiMucci covered "Honky Tonk Blues" on his 2007 album, Bronx in Blue.
- Richard & Linda Thompson recorded a live version on the 2010 deluxe edition of Shoot Out the Lights.
- Lacy J. Dalton recorded the song for her 2010 album, Here's to Hank.

== Chart performance ==
=== Hank Williams version ===
Chart (1952)	Peak position
US Hot Country Songs (Billboard)	2

=== Charley Pride version ===
Weekly charts

Chart (1980)	Peak position
US Hot Country Songs (Billboard)	1
Canadian RPM Country Tracks	1

Year-end charts

Chart (1980)	Position
US Hot Country Songs (Billboard)	40

=== Pirates of the Mississippi version ===
Chart (1990)	Peak position
Canada Country Singles (RPM)	12
US Hot Country Songs (Billboard)	26

== Bibliography ==
- Escott, Colin; Merritt, George; MacEwen, William (2004). Hank Williams: The Biography. New York: Little, Brown.
