= Baby, We're Really in Love =

1951 Hank Williams song

Single by Hank Williams With His Drifting Cowboys
- B-side: "I'd Still Want You"
- Published: October 17, 1951 Acuff-Rose Publications
- Released: November 1951
- Recorded: July 25, 1951
- Studio: Castle Studio, Nashville
- Genre: Country & Western, Honky-tonk, Country blues
- Length: 2:32
- Label: MGM
- Songwriter: Hank Williams
- Producer: Fred Rose

Hank Williams With His Drifting Cowboys singles chronology
"(I Heard That) Lonesome Whistle" (1951)	"Baby, We're Really in Love" (1951)	"Honky Tonk Blues" (1952)

"Baby, We're Really in Love" is a song written and recorded by Hank Williams and released on MGM Records. It peaked at number four on the Billboard country singles chart. It was recorded at Castle Studio in Nashville on July 25, 1951 with Fred Rose producing and backing from Don Helms (steel guitar), Jerry Rivers (fiddle), Sammy Pruett (lead guitar), Howard Watts (bass) and probably Jack Shook (rhythm guitar). It was his fourteenth Top 5 hit.

== Cover versions ==
- Don Gibson recorded the song for RCA Records in 1962.
- Hank Williams, Jr. recorded it as an overdubbed duet for his father on MGM in 1965.
- Leona Williams cut the song for Hickory Records.
- The Reckless Drifters (John Easdale and Christa Collins) re-recorded this song in 2018. Sirius XM,"The Rodney Bingenheimer Show".
