= Margo Smith discography =

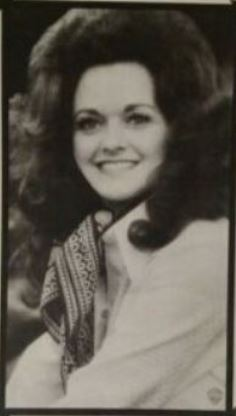
- Margo Smith, 1977
- Studio albums: 18
- Compilation albums: 2
- Singles: 37
- Other appearances: 3

American country music artist Margo Smith has released 18 studio albums, two compilation albums, 37 singles and appeared on three albums. She signed her first recording contract with 20th Century Fox Records in 1975. That year, she had her first major hit with "There I Said It." The song reached the top ten of the Billboard Hot Country Songs chart and was followed by her self-titled album. The label closed its doors and she signed to Warner Bros. Records in 1976. She had several more hits, including the top ten "Take My Breath Away." She released two more albums, including Song Bird (1976), which reached the top 40 of the Billboard Top Country Albums list. In 1978, Smith had her biggest commercial success with the number one hits "Don't Break the Heart That Loves You" and "It Only Hurts for a Little While." The hits were included on a 1977 studio album that reached the top 30.

In 1979, Smith made a shift towards a "sexier image" which altered her musical career. She had two more top ten hits with "Still a Woman" and "If I Give My Heart to You" before reverting to back to a more traditional country image. In 1981, she had a final major hit with "Cup of Tea." The duet with Rex Allen, Jr. reached the country top 20. Smith left Warner Bros. in the early 1980s and continued releasing albums and singles independently. In 1985, she released an album titled The Best of the Tennessee Yodeler, which paid tribute to country singer Bonnie Lou. Her singles continued charting on the Billboard country songs list. Smith had her final chart hit with 1988's "Echo Me." Smith then began recording Christian music with her daughter and signed with Homeland records. In 2005, she released her most current album to date titled Nothing to Lose.

== Albums ==
=== Studio albums ===
List of studio albums, with selected chart positions, showing other details
Title	Album details	Peak chart positions	
Title	Album details	US Cou.	CAN Cou.
I'm a Lady (Note: credited as "Bette Smith")	Released: 1971; Label: Nashville North; Formats: LP	—	—
Margo Smith	Released: September 1975; Label: 20th Century Fox; Formats: LP	42	—
Song Bird	Released: July 1976; Label: Warner Bros.; Formats: LP	34	—
Happiness	Released: April 1977; Label: Warner Bros.; Formats: LP, cassette	41	—
Don't Break the Heart That Loves You	Released: May 1978; Label: Warner Bros.; Formats: LP, cassette	27	—
A Woman	Released: February 1979; Label: Warner Bros.; Formats: LP	36	20
Just Margo	Released: October 1979; Label: Warner Bros.; Formats: LP, cassette	—	14
Diamonds and Chills	Released: September 1980; Label: Warner Bros.; Formats: LP, cassette	—	—
Ridin' High	Released: 1981; Label: Cammeron; Formats: LP	—	—
The Best of the Tennessee Yodeler	Released: 1985; Label: Bermuda Dunes; Formats: LP	—	—
Margo Smith	Released: 1986; Label: Dot/MCA; Formats: LP, cassette	—	—
The Best Yet	Released: 1987; Label: Playback; Formats: LP	—	—
Back in the Swing	Released: 1989; Label: Cammeron; Formats: CD	—	—
Just the Beginning (with Holly)	Released: 1991; Label: Homeland; Formats: CD	—	—
Wishes (with Holly)	Released: 1992; Label: Homeland; Formats: Cassette, CD	—	—
God's Bigger Than Wall Street	Released: 1992; Label: Mercy Street; Formats: CD	—	—
Swiss, Cowboy and Country	Released: 1993; Label: Cammeron; Formats: CD	—	—
Nothing to Lose	Released: January 5, 2005; Label: Lamon; Formats: CD, music download	—	—
"—" denotes a recording that did not chart or was not released in that territory.

=== Compilation albums ===
List of compilation albums, showing all relevant details
Title	Album details
The Soft Side of Margo: Greatest Hits	Released: 1989; Label: Cammeron; Formats: LP, cassette
The Very Best of Margo Smith	Released: June 6, 2015; Label: Varèse Sarabande; Formats: CD, music download

== Singles ==
=== As lead artist ===
List of singles, with selected chart positions, showing other relevant details
Title	Year	Peak chart positions				Album
Title	Year	US	US AC	US Cou.	CAN Cou.	Album
"I'm a Lady" (Note: Single is credited as Bette Smith.)	1971	—	—	—	—	I'm a Lady
"The Animal Song" (Note: Single is credited as Bette Smith.)	1972	—	—	—	—	—N/a
"What Have I Done (I'm So Ashamed)" (Note: Single is credited as Bette Smith.)	1972	—	—	—	—	—N/a
"Lulu of Tennessee" (Note: Single is credited as Bette Smith.)	1973	—	—	—	—	—N/a
"There I Said It"	1975	—	—	8	14	Margo Smith
"Paper Lovin'"	1975	—	—	30	—	Margo Smith
"Meet Me Later"	1975	—	—	51	—	—N/a
"Save Your Kisses for Me"	1976	—	—	10	—	Songbird
"Take My Breath Away"	1976	—	—	7	—	Happiness
"Love's Explosion"	1977	—	—	12	—	Happiness
"My Weakness"	1977	—	—	23	—	Happiness
"So Close Again" (with Norro Wilson)	1977	—	—	43	—	Happiness
"Don't Break the Heart That Loves You"	1977	— (Note: "Don't Break the Heart That Loves You" peaked at number 4 on the Billboard Bubbling Under Hot 100 singles chart, a list which acts as a 25-song extension of the Hot 100.)	40	1	5	Don't Break the Heart That Loves You
"It Only Hurts for a Little While"	1978	—	—	1	1	Don't Break the Heart That Loves You
"Little Things Mean a Lot"	1978	—	37	3	6	Don't Break the Heart That Loves You
"Still a Woman"	1979	—	—	7	17	A Woman
"If I Give My Heart to You"	1979	—	—	10	45	A Woman
"Baby My Baby"	1979	—	—	27	53	Just Margo
"The Shuffle Song"	1979	—	—	13	21	Just Margo
"My Guy"	1980	—	—	43	—	Diamonds and Chills
"He Gives Me Diamonds and Chills"	1980	—	—	52	—	Diamonds and Chills
"My Heart Cries for You"	1981	—	—	72	—	—N/a
"Either You're Married or You're Single"	1982	—	—	64	—	Ridin' High
"Could It Be I Don't Belong Here Anymore"	1982	—	—	70	—	Ridin' High
"Wedding Bells"	1983	—	—	78	—	Ridin' High
"Please Tell Him That I Said Hello"	1984	—	—	63	—	—N/a
"The Thin Ragged Edge"	1984	—	—	—	—	—N/a
"Sittin' on Santa's Knee"	1984	—	—	—	—	—N/a
"Take Your Memory When You Go"	1985	—	—	—	—	—N/a
"All I Do Is Dream of You"	1985	—	—	82	—	—N/a
"Everyday People" (with Tom Grant)	1985	—	—	63	—	—N/a
"Alone"	1987	—	—	—	—	The Best Yet
"Echo Me" (Note: "Echo Me" is only included on the 2013 re-release of The Best Yet.)	1988	—	—	77	—	The Best Yet
"Hold Me"	1988	—	—	—	—	The Best Yet
"It Is No Secret"	1988	—	—	—	—	—N/a
"—" denotes a recording that did not chart or was not released in that territory.

=== As a featured artist ===
List of featured singles, with selected chart positions, showing other relevant details
Title	Year	Peak chart positions	Album
Title	Year	US Country	Album
"Cup of Tea" (with Rex Allen, Jr.)	1980	12	The Cat's in the Cradle
"While the Feelin's Good" (with Rex Allen, Jr.)	1981	26	—N/a

== Other appearances ==
List of non-single guest appearances, showing year released and album name
Title	Year	Album	Ref.
"We Wish You a Merry Christmas"	1988	K-tel Presents Christmas Favorites	
"The Twelve Days of Christmas"	1992	K-tel's Best of Christmas	
"The Littlest Star" (Pop/country vocal version)	2000	The Littlest Star: A Musical Story	
