= Margo Smith (1986 album) =

Studio album (re-recording) by Margo Smith
- Released: 1986
- Recorded: Fall 1985
- Studio: Studio 19
- Genre: Country
- Label: Dot; MCA
- Producer: Al Henson

Margo Smith chronology
The Best of the Tennessee Yodeler (1985)	Margo Smith (1986)	The Best Yet (1987)

Margo Smith is a re-recorded studio album by American country music artist Margo Smith. It was released in 1986 in conjunction with Dot Records and MCA Records. The project was Smith's second eponymous release and contained ten tracks of material. While all the material was newly recorded, the songs chosen for the album were re-recordings of music Smith first cut during the 1970s.

== Background, content and release ==
During the late 1970s, Margo Smith had several major country hits with songs like "Don't Break the Heart That Loves You," "It Only Hurts for a Little While" and "Little Things Mean a Lot". After making several changes to wardrobe and musical appearance, Smith went into different stylistic directions during the 1980s and had less commercial success. She continued releasing music to several different labels. In 1985, MCA Records announced a plan to reactivate and take control of Dot Records. With the new label, MCA also announced they would record and release new music by several veteran country artists. The albums were set for release between 1985 and 1986. Smith was among the artists chosen for the new joint venture. She began recording for the project during the fall of 1985 at Studio 19, located in Nashville, Tennessee. The sessions were produced by Al Henson.

The eponymous release contained a total of ten tracks. The project were ten newly re-recorded versions of songs previously cut by Smith while at 20th Century Fox and Warner Bros. labels respectively. Included were re-recordings of Smith's two number one singles from 1978: "Don't Break the Heart That Loves You" and "It Only Hurts for a Little While". Also included were re-recordings of the top ten hits "Still a Woman," "There I Said It," "Save Your Kisses for Me" and "Little Things Mean a Lot". The album was released in 1986 via Dot and MCA Records. It was issued as a vinyl LP and as a cassette with similar track listings.

== Track listing ==
Side one
No.	Title	Writer(s)	Length
1.	"Don't Break the Heart That Loves You"	Benny Davis; Ted Murry
2.	"Still a Woman"	Mack David; Margo Smith; Norris D. Wilson
3.	"Love's Explosion"	Smith; Wilson
4.	"If I Give My Heart to You"	Jimmy Brewster; Jimmie Crane; Al Jacobs
5.	"It Only Hurts for a Little While"	David; Fred Spielman

Side two
No.	Title	Writer(s)	Length
1.	"Little Things Mean a Lot"	Edith Lindeman; Carl Stutz
2.	"Paper Lovin'"	Smith
3.	"Shuffle Song"	David; Smith; Wilson
4.	"There I Said It"	Smith
5.	"Save Your Kisses for Me"	Tony Hiller; Lee Sheriden; Martin Lee

== Personnel ==
All credits are adapted from the liner notes of Margo Smith.

Musical and technical personnel

- Clyde Brooks – Drums
- Sonny Garrish – Steel guitar
- Al Henson – Producer
- Hoot Hester – Fiddle
- Roger Morris – Keyboards
- Gary Prim – Keyboards
- Jack Ross – Bass
- Ronny Scaife – Rhythm guitar
- Dale Sellers – Lead guitar
- Margo Smith – Lead vocals
- Bruce Watkins – Rhythm guitar

== Release history ==
Region	Date	Format	Label	Ref.
United States	1986	Vinyl; cassette	Dot Records; MCA Records	
