= A Woman (Margo Smith album) =

Studio album by Margo Smith
- Released: February 1979
- Recorded: January – December 1978
- Studio: Columbia Recording Studio
- Genre: Country; country pop
- Label: Warner Bros.
- Producer: Norro Wilson

Margo Smith chronology
Don't Break the Heart That Loves You (1978)	A Woman (1979)	Just Margo (1979)

Singles from A Woman
- 1. "Still a Woman" Released: January 1979; 2. "If I Give My Heart to You" Released: May 1979

A Woman is a studio album by American country music artist Margo Smith. It was released in February 1979 via Warner Bros. Records and contained ten tracks. It was the sixth studio release of Smith's music career and spawned two singles: "Still a Woman" and "If I Give My Heart to You." Both songs became major hits on the country charts in 1979. The album itself also reached charting positions following its release. A Woman received mixed reviews from music writers and journalists.

== Background and content ==
By 1979, Margo Smith had several major hits on the Billboard country chart, including the number one songs "Don't Break the Heart That Loves You" and "It Only Hurts for a Little While." However, she was beginning to feel unsure of musical identity. In a 1979 interview with Billboard magazine, Smith explained that she had not found a song that set her apart from other female country artists: "Song like 'Little Things Mean a Lot,' 'Don't Break the Heart That Loves You' and 'It Only Hurts for a Little While' are really my kind of songs, my style, but people can't remember you by that. You almost have to have a 'Coal Miner's Daughter' or Divorce-type song before you can establish yourself to the people."

Smith recorded the tracks for A Woman between January and December 1978. Sessions were held at the Columbia Recording Studio in Nashville, Tennessee. The sessions were produced by Norro Wilson, Smith's long-time producer at Warner Bros. Records. The album contained ten tracks. The album's concept was built off the title track, "Still a Woman," which Smith co-wrote with Mack David and Norro Wilson. The song (and album) was meant to marketed towards middle-aged women and mothers, according to Smith. She also wrote three additional tracks for the project. This included "You're the Song," which is a recitation. Also included on the album are cover versions of pop hits, such as Doris Day's "If I Give My Heart to You" and Classics IV's "Traces."

== Release and reception ==
Professional ratings
Review scores
Source	Rating
AllMusic	2.5/5 stars

A Woman was released in February 1979 on Warner Bros. Records. Its release marked the sixth studio album of Smith's music career and her fourth for the Warner label. The album was distributed as a vinyl LP with five songs on either side of the record. A Woman later reached number 36 on the Billboard Top Country Albums chart, becoming her third-highest LP to peak there. In Canada, it became Smith's first album to reach the RPM Country Albums chart In 1979, the LP reached number 20 on the survey.

The project also spawned two singles that were released in 1979 and became major hits. Its first single was "Still a Woman," which was released on Warner Bros. in January 1979. The song reached the top ten of the Billboard Hot Country Songs chart, climbing to number seven later that year. In May 1979, "If I Give My Heart to You" was released as the album's second single. The song peaked at number ten on the Billboard country singles chart, becoming her final top ten in her career. Both singles also charted on the RPM Country Singles chart in Canada, with "Still a Woman" becoming the highest-charting hit there, climbing to number 17.

A Woman received mixed reviews from writers and critics following its release. Sally Hinkle of Billboard magazine gave the record a favorable response in an article discussing the album. In her write-up, Hinkle observed a change in Smith's musical persona, which she noted in the album itself: "With the release of Margo Smith's latest Warner Bros. album, A Woman, some dramatic changes are in the making for the singer/songwriter. Greg Adams of AllMusic compared songs like "Still a Woman" to that of Lou Reed's "Walk on the Wild Side," calling the bass riff "oddly borrowed." However, he concluded in a positive way, stating, "A Woman is slick but not sterile, has a cast of well-known players, and displays a mildly adventurous spirit."

== Track listing ==
Side one
No.	Title	Writer(s)	Length
1.	"Still a Woman"	Mack David; Margo Smith; Norris D. Wilson	3:25
2.	"If I Give My Heart to You"	Jimmy Brewster; Jimmie Crane; Al Jacobs	2:36
3.	"The Belle of Buttercup Lane"	David; Smith	3:32
4.	"Don't You Love Me Anymore"	David; Al Hoffman; Jerry Livingston	2:17
5.	"My Greatest Sin"	David; Wilson	3:17

Side two
No.	Title	Writer(s)	Length
1.	"Traces"	Buddy Buie; J. R. Cobb; Emory Gordy Jr.	2:59
2.	"Ain't We Just a Couple of Fools"	Steve Davis; Wilson	2:44
3.	"Tennessee Sandman"	David; Smith	2:54
4.	"We'd Better Love It Over"	Mark Sherrill; Josh Whitmore	2:50
5.	"You're the Song"	David; Smith	2:30

== Personnel ==
All credits are adapted from the liner notes of A Woman.

Musical personnel

- Tommy Allsup – Tic tac bass
- Eddie Brady – Background vocals
- David Briggs – Piano
- Kenneth Buttrey – Drums
- Jerry Carrigan – Drums
- Pete Drake – Steel guitar
- Ronald Drake – Background vocals
- Ray Edenton – Rhythm guitar
- Beckie Foster – Background vocals
- Steve Gibson – Rhythm guitar
- Dennis Good – Horns
- Allen Henson – Background vocals
- John Hughey – Steel guitar
- Sheri Kramer – Background vocals
- The Sheldon Kurland Strings – Strings
- Kenny Malone – Drums
- LaVerna Moore – Background vocals
- Billy Puett – Horns
- Hargus "Pig" Robbins – Piano
- Billy Sanford – Lead guitar, mandolin
- Lisa Silver – Background vocals
- Margo Smith – Lead vocals
- Henry Strzelecki – Bass
- Diane Tidwell – Background vocals
- George Tidwell – Horns
- Bobby Thompson – Rhythm guitar
- Pete Wade – Rhythm guitar
- Reggie Young – Lead guitar

Technical personnel

- Lou Bradley – Engineering
- John Cabalka – Art directions
- Sam Causey – Photography
- Brad Kanawyer – Design
- Bergen White – String arrangement
- Norro Wilson – Producer
- James Wood – Lettering

== Charts ==
Chart (1979)	Peak position
Canada Country Albums/CDs (RPM)	20
US Top Country Albums (Billboard)	36

== Release history ==
Region	Date	Format	Label	Ref.
United States	February 1979	Vinyl	Warner Bros. Records	
