= Nothing to Lose (Margo Smith album) =

Studio album by Margo Smith
- Released: January 5, 2005
- Studio: dLab Studios
- Genre: Country; Christian
- Length: 29:12
- Label: Lamon
- Producer: Dave Moody

Margo Smith chronology
Wishes (1992)	Nothing to Lose (2005)

Nothing to Lose is a studio album by American country artist Margo Smith. It was released on January 5, 2005 via Lamon Records and contained ten tracks. The album was a mixture of country and Christian songs, some of which were composed by Smith herself. It was her first album released in nearly a decade and her first for the Lamon label.

== Background, content and release ==
In the 1970s, Margo Smith became successful through a series of hits in the country field. Songs like "There I Said It" (1975), "Don't Break the Heart That Loves You" (1978), "Little Things Mean a Lot" (1978) and "Still a Woman" became major hits on the Billboard country singles chart. In later decades, Smith formed a Christian duo with her daughter and released a series of albums in the same format. Continuing to tour as both a country and Christian artist, she would release Nothing to Lose in 2005. The album contained a total of ten tracks, six of which were composed by Smith herself. This included the title track, "God Gave Me You" and "When You're Down to Nothing".

Nothing to Lose also contained four recordings composed by other songwriters. This included a cover of the Christian hymns, "At the Feet of Jesus," "Just a Closer Walk with Thee" and the Ray Stevens song "Everything Is Beautiful". The album was produced by musician Dave Moody and was recorded at dLab Studios. The project was released on January 5, 2005 via Lamon Records. It was offered as a compact disc and a music download. It was Smith's first studio album since 1993's Swiss, Cowboy and Country. It was also her eighteenth studio recording and first for Lamon Records.

== Track listing ==
Nothing to Lose (CD and digital versions)
No.	Title	Writer(s)	Length
1.	"Nothing to Lose"	Margo Smith	2:59
2.	"Love the Sinner"	Smith	2:36
3.	"God Gave Me You"	Smith	2:37
4.	"Perfect"	Smith	3:38
5.	"We're Getting Older"	Mark Sherrill; Smith	2:28
6.	"When You're Down to Nothing"	Smith	3:03
7.	"At the Feet of Jesus"	Joel Lindsey; Jerry Salley	3:38
8.	"Enjoy Your Day"	Rodney Griffin	2:32
9.	"Just a Closer Walk with Thee"	Traditional	2:40
10.	"Everything Is Beautiful"	Ray Stevens	3:20
Total length:			29:12

== Personnel ==
All credits are adapted from AllMusic and the liner notes of Nothing to Lose.

Musical personnel

- Mylon Hayes – Bass, bass guitar
- Dave Johnson – Fiddle, harmonica, pedal steel guitar
- Allen Kerr – Drums
- Dave Moody – Acoustic guitar, electric guitar, dobro, guitar, mandolin
- Joshua Moody – Drums
- Rebecca Moody – Chorus
- Ron Murray – Vocal harmony
- Chris Lockhart Smith – Chorus
- Lisa Maria Smith – Chorus
- Margo Smith – Lead vocals
- Lewis Wells – Piano

Technical personnel

- Cody McSwain – Engineer
- Nelson McSwain – Audio production
- Dave Moody – Audio production, engineer, producer
- Joshua Moody – Percussion
- Hope Powell – Photography

== Release history ==
Region	Date	Format	Label	Ref.
United States	January 5, 2005	Compact disc; music download; streaming	Lamon Records	
