= Don't Break the Heart That Loves You (album) =

Studio album by Margo Smith
- Released: May 1978
- Recorded: November 1977 – January 1978
- Studio: Columbia Recording Studio
- Genre: Country; country pop
- Label: Warner Bros.
- Producer: Norro Wilson

Margo Smith chronology
Happiness (1977)	Don't Break the Heart That Loves You (1978)	A Woman (1979)

Singles from Don't Break the Heart That Loves You
- 1. "Don't Break the Heart That Loves You" Released: December 1977; 2. "It Only Hurts for a Little While" Released: March 1978; 3. "Little Things Mean a Lot" Released: August 1978

Don't Break the Heart That Loves You is a studio album by American country music artist Margo Smith. It was released in May 1978 via Warner Bros. Records and contained ten tracks. The album included a mixture of new recordings and covers of original hits by other artists. It was the fifth studio release of Smith's career and spawned three major hits, including the number one country songs "Don't Break the Heart That Loves You" and "It Only Hurts for a Little While."

== Background and content ==
Margo Smith had several years of country hits after signing with Warner Bros. Records in 1976 with such songs as "Take My Breath Away." Between November 1977 and January 1978, Smith went into the studio to cut her third studio recording for Warner Bros. The sessions were produced by Norro Wilson, who had also worked with Smith on her two previous studio offerings. The sessions were held at the Columbia Recording Studio in Nashville, Tennessee.

Don't Break the Heart That Loves You contained a total of ten tracks. It included a mixture of new recordings and cover versions of previously released material. Of the new cuts were two songs penned by Smith herself titled "Make Love the Way We Used To" and "Ode to a Cheater." Of the covers were two songs first made pop hits by Connie Francis: the title track and "Breakin' in a Brand New Broken Heart." Other covers included "Just Out of Reach (Of My Two Open Arms)," "Memories Are Made of This" and the Ames Brothers' "It Only Hurts for a Little While."

== Release and reception ==
Professional ratings
Review scores
Source	Rating
Allmusic	3/5 stars

Don't Break the Heart That Loves You was released in May 1978 on Warner Bros. Records. It became the fifth studio album of Smith's career and her third for the Warner label. It was originally offered as a vinyl LP containing five songs on each side of the record. In similar format, it was issued via cassette. The album peaked at number 27 on the Billboard Top Country Albums chart. It was Smith's highest-peaking LP on the chart. Don't Break the Heart That Loves You received a three-star rating from AllMusic.

The project also spawned three singles. The first was the title track (issued as a single in December 1977), which became Smith's first number one hit on the Billboard Hot Country Songs chart. Its second single was released in March 1978, which was a cover of "It Only Hurts for a Little While." It became Smith's second number hit on the Billboard country chart later that year. The third and final single issued from the LP was Smith's cover of Kitty Kallen's "Little Things Mean a Lot" (issued in August 1978). The song reached number three on the same chart. In addition, two singles reached the top ten of the RPM country singles chart in Canada. "It Only Hurts for a Little While" reached the top spot of the chart.

== Track listing ==
=== Vinyl and cassette versions ===
Side one
No.	Title	Writer(s)	Length
1.	"Don't Break the Heart That Loves You"	Benny Davis; Ted Murry	2:52
2.	"It Only Hurts for a Little While"	Mack David; Fred Spielman	3:04
3.	"Little Things Mean a Lot"	Edith Lindeman; Carl Stutz	2:52
4.	"Just Out of Reach (Of My Two Open Arms)"	Virgil "Pappy" Stewart	2:34
5.	"Make Love the Way We Used To"	Margo Smith; Norris D. Wilson	2:56

Side two
No.	Title	Writer(s)	Length
1.	"Ode to a Cheater"	Smith	2:37
2.	"Your Sweet Lies"	David Chamberlain; James Vest	2:40
3.	"Don't Squeeze My Charlie"	Curtis Allen	2:55
4.	"Memories Are Made of This"	Richard Dehr; Terry Gilkyson; Frank Miller	2:56
5.	"Breakin' in a Brand New Broken Heart"	Howard Greenfield; Jack Keller	2:25

== Personnel ==
All credits are adapted from the original liner notes of Don't Break the Heart That Loves You.

Musical personnel

- Tommy Allsup – musician
- Kenneth Buttrey – musician
- Jimmy Capps – musician
- Jerry Carrigan – musician
- Curly Chalker – musician
- Tommy Cogbill – musician
- Pete Drake – musician
- Ray Edenton – musician
- Buddy Emmons – musician
- Steve Gibson – musician
- Kenny Malone – musician
- Grady Martin – musician
- Charlie McCoy – musician
- Farrell Morris – musician
- Billy Puett – musician
- Hargus "Pig" Robbins – musician
- Billy Sanford – musician
- Margo Smith – lead vocals
- Henry Strzelecki – musician
- Pete Wade – musician
- Bobby Wood – musician

Technical personnel

- Lou Bradley – engineer
- Sound Seventy – backing vocals
- Ed Thrasher – photography
- Bergen White – string arrangement
- Norro Wilson – producer

== Charts ==
Chart (1978)	Peak position
US Top Country Albums (Billboard)	27

== Release history ==
Region	Date	Format	Label	Ref.
United States	May 1978	Vinyl	Warner Bros. Records	
United States	May 1978	Cassette	Warner Bros. Records	
