= Just Margo =

Studio album by Margo Smith
- Released: October 1979
- Recorded: June – July 1979
- Studio: Columbia Recording Studio
- Genre: Country; country pop
- Label: Warner Bros.
- Producer: Norro Wilson

Margo Smith chronology
A Woman (1979)	Just Margo (1979)	Diamonds and Chills (1980)

Singles from Just Margo
- 1. "Baby My Baby" Released: August 1979; 2. "The Shuffle Song" Released: November 1979

Just Margo is a studio album by American country music artist Margo Smith. It was released in October 1979 via Warner Bros. Records and contained 12 tracks. It was the seventh studio release in Smith's music career and spawned two singles: "Baby My Baby" and "The Shuffle Song" (the latter of which became the highest-peaking chart hit). The album itself reached peak positions on national publication charts following its release.

== Background and content ==
By 1979, Margo Smith had two number one singles on the American country charts with the songs "Don't Break the Heart That Loves You" and "It Only Hurts for a Little While." Following this, she adopted a "sexier" image and had hits that further defined this new persona, such as "Still a Woman." Her new image transitioned into 1979 album release, Just Margo, which featured Smith wearing a satin bathrobe on the cover. Just Margo was recorded between June and July 1979 at the Columbia Recording Studio, located in Nashville, Tennessee. The sessions were produced by Norro Wilson, who had been collaborating with Smith since her first studio release with Warner Bros. Records in 1976. Just Margo contained twelve tracks, five of which were composed by Smith herself. It also included covers of previously recorded material, such as Kris Kristofferson's "I'd Rather Be Sorry" and Janis Ian's "Jesse."

== Release and chart performance ==
Just Margo was released in October 1979 on Warner Bros. Records. The project marked the seventh studio album of Smith's music career. The album was issued as a vinyl LP, containing six songs on either side of the record. It was also offered as a cassette with an identical track listing. The album peaked at number 14 on the Canadian RPM Country Albums chart. It was her highest-peaking LP on the chart and her final-charting LP to reach such a position. Just Margo also spawned two singles. The first single was released in August 1979, which was titled "Baby My Baby". The song climbed to number 27 on the Billboard Hot Country Songs chart later that year.

According to an article from Billboard magazine, the track "He's Lying" was being considered as the album's second single. However, "The Shuffle Song" was issued as the album's second single, in November 1979. The song reached number 13 on the same country chart in 1980. It became Smith's final top 20 single on that chart. Both singles also reached charting positions on the RPM Country Songs chart, with "The Shuffle Song" peaking at number 21.

== Track listing ==
=== Vinyl and cassette versions ===
Side one
No.	Title	Writer(s)	Length
1.	"Let's Build a Fire"	Peggy Forman	2:30
2.	"He's Lyin'" (with Ronnie McDowell)	Mack David; Margo Smith	2:29
3.	"I'm Tying the Leaves Back on the Trees"	David; Smith	2:55
4.	"Jesse"	Janis Ian	3:54
5.	"Love Is Why"	Christina Carroll; Jay B. Lloyd	3:11
6.	"Baby My Baby"	David; Smith; Norris D. Wilson	2:48

Side two
No.	Title	Writer(s)	Length
1.	"How Much of a Fool Can a Woman Be"	Carroll; Lloyd	3:23
2.	"I Threw It Away"	Curtis Allen	2:46
3.	"Move Over Juanita"	David; Margaret Everly; Wilson	3:15
4.	"I'd Rather Be Sorry"	Kris Kristofferson	2:42
5.	"Night Flight"	Smith; Mark Sherrill	2:50
6.	"The Shuffle Song"	David; Smith; Wilson	3:27

== Personnel ==
All credits are adapted from the liner notes of Just Margo.

Musical personnel

- Tommy Allsup – Tic tac bass
- David Briggs – Keyboards
- Tommy Cogbill – Bass
- Ray Edenton – Rhythm guitar
- Sonny Garrish – Steel guitar
- Steve Gibson – Rhythm guitar
- Robert Hajacos – Fiddle
- Sheri Kramer – Background vocals
- The Shelly Kurland Strings – Strings
- Larrie Londin – Drums
- Kenny Malone – Drums
- Bill Puett – Horn
- Billy Sanford – Guitar
- Lisa Silver – Background vocals
- Don Sheffiled – Horn
- Margo Smith – Lead vocals
- Buddy Spicher – Fiddle
- Henry Strzelecki – Bass
- Diane Tidwell – Background vocals
- Pete Wade – Rhythm guitar
- Reggie Young – Guitar

Technical personnel

- Lou Bradley – Engineering
- Farrell Morris – Percussion
- Bergen White – String arrangement
- Norro Wilson – Producer

== Charts ==
Chart (1979)	Peak position
Canada Country Albums/CDs (RPM)	14

== Release history ==
Region	Date	Format	Label	Ref.
Canada	October 1979	Vinyl	Warner Bros. Records	
United States	October 1979	Vinyl; cassette	Warner Bros. Records	
