= The Best of the Tennessee Yodeler =

Studio album by Margo Smith
- Released: 1985; 1987
- Recorded: 1984–1985
- Genre: Country
- Label: Bermuda Dunes; Moon Shine; MCA
- Producer: Richard Cammeron; Andy Di Martino

Margo Smith chronology
Ridin' High (1981)	The Best of the Tennessee Yodeler (00000001)	Margo Smith (1986)

The Best of the Tennessee Yodeler is a studio album by American country music artist Margo Smith. It was first released in 1985 via Moon Shine Records and contained 14 tracks and was re-released in 1987 in conjunction with Bermuda Dunes Records and MCA Records. Dedicated to one of Smith's childhood performing idols, The Best of the Tennessee Yodeler was the tenth studio album in her recording career. The project was sold on television in addition to being sold in record stores.

== Background, content and release ==
Margo Smith had several years of commercial country music success during the late 1970s, including the number one hits "Don't Break the Heart That Loves You" and "It Only Hurts for a Little While". In 1982, she chose to leave her recording contract with Warner Bros. Records and began releasing music independently through her own record label, Cammeron Records.

The Best of the Tennessee Yodeler was an album Smith chose to record in dedication to one of musical idols, country artist Bonnie Lou. The project was recorded between 1984 and 1985 in sessions co-produced by Andy Di Martino and husband Richard Cammeron. The album contained a total of 14 tracks. This included re-recordings of Smith's former country hits, such as "Take My Breath Away." Six of the album's material was composed by Smith herself, including two compositions co-written with former producer Norro Wilson and two with Richard Cammeron. Also included were cover versions of songs such as Hank Williams' "Lovesick Blues" and Patsy Montana's "I Want to Be a Cowboy's Sweetheart." Also featured were several tracks that showcased Smith's yodeling vocal skills, such as "He Taught Me How to Yodel".

The Best of the Tennessee Yodeler was first released on Moon Shine Records in 1985. It was originally issued as a vinyl LP containing seven tracks on either side of the record. In 1987, it was re-released in conjunction with Bermuda Dunes Records and MCA Records with an identical track listing. The 1987 released was also distributed as a vinyl LP. Following its release, the album was sold in record stores, but mostly sold on television. Infomercial advertisements were often seen by viewers on cable television.

== Track listing ==
=== Original and re-release versions ===
Side one
No.	Title	Writer(s)	Length
1.	"The Way It Used to Be"	Owen Davis; Margo Smith	3:01
2.	"You Take My Breath Away"	Smith; Norris D. Wilson	2:40
3.	"The Cowboy Yodel Song"	Al Porter	2:10
4.	"Lovesick Blues"	Cliff Friend; Irving Mills	2:48
5.	"Wantin', Needin' (Drives Me Crazy)"	Smith	2:38
6.	"Hand Clappin' Foot Stompin' Country Music"	Richard Cammeron; Smith	3:17
7.	"He Taught Me to Yodel"	Tom Emerson; Paul Roberts	2:09

Side two
No.	Title	Writer(s)	Length
1.	"Tennessee Yodeler"	Smith	2:30
2.	"My Weakness"	Smith; Wilson	2:30
3.	"Chime Bells"	Elton Britt; Bob Miller	2:42
4.	"Indian Love Call"	Rudolf Friml; Oscar Hammerstein; Otto Harbach; Herbert Stothart	2:09
5.	"Ridin' High"	Cammeron; Smith	2:07
6.	"Wedding Bells"	Claude Boone	2:34
7.	"I Want to Be a Cowboy's Sweetheart"	Patsy Montana	2:46

== Personnel ==
All credits are adapted from the original 1985 liner notes The Best of the Tennessee Yodeler.

Musical and technical personnel

- Richard Cammeron – Producer
- Dennis Carney – Cover photo
- Ken Kim – Art direction and graphics
- Andy Di Martino – Producer
- Margo Smith – Lead vocals
- Billy Strange – String arrangement
- Bill Vorndyck – Engineer

== Release history ==
Region	Date	Format	Label	Ref.
United States	1985	Vinyl	Moon Shine Records	
United Kingdom	1987	Vinyl	Bermuda Dunes Records; MCA Records	
