= Just the Beginning (Margo Smith & Holly album) =

Studio album by Margo Smith & Holly
- Released: 1991
- Genre: Christian
- Label: Homeland
- Producer: Bobby All; Gary McSpadden

Margo Smith chronology
The Best Yet (1987)	Just the Beginning (1991)	Wishes (1992)

Just the Beginning is a studio album by American country artist Margo Smith and her daughter, Holly. It was released in 1991 via Homeland Records and contained ten tracks. The album was a collection of duets between mother and daughter. It was also the duo's first album project together.

== Background, content and release ==
Margo Smith had first found commercial success as a country singer during the late 1970s. Recording for 20th Century Fox and later Warner Bros., she had major hits with songs like "There I Said It", "Don't Break the Heart That Loves You" and "Still a Woman". After her chart success faded, Smith recorded for independent record labels during the 1980s. In the early 1990s, Smith formed a Christian/gospel duo with her daughter, Holly Smith. In 1991, the mother-daughter collaboration signed a recording contract with Homeland Records. They recorded their first studio album during the same time. Just the Beginning was a collection of ten tracks, all of which were duets between mother and daughter. The project was produced Bobby All and Gary McSpadden.

Just the Beginning was released on the Homeland label in 1991. It was Margo Smith's first collaborative release in her career. It was Holly Smith's first album release as a music artist. The album was issued as a compact disc. The album's release would bring success for the Smith duo. Their songs would later find success on contemporary Christian radio, however, no specific singles are mentioned. They would continue collaborating through the 1990s and release more music as a duo.

== Track listing ==
Just the Beginning
No.	Title	Writer(s)	Length
1.	"I Know the Way to Him by Heart"	Jerry Haynes
2.	"Tabernacle"	Matthew Fisher
3.	"We Are Family"	not available
4.	"God's Kept Me All the Years"	Dawn Thomas
5.	"Rise Up"	not available
6.	"Rain Falls"	not available
7.	"Cross Your Heart"	not available
8.	"You Could See Heaven from Our Living Room"	not available
9.	"Don't Give Up"	not available
10.	"Just the Beginning for Me"	Charles Wilburn

== Personnel ==
All credits are adapted from the liner notes of Just the Beginning.

Musical personnel

- Craig Adams – Background vocals
- Paul Brannon – Acoustic guitar, electric guitar
- Gary Burnette – Acoustic guitar, mandolin
- Mark Casstevens – Acoustic guitar
- Michael English – Background vocals
- Sonny Garrish – Steel guitar
- Rob Hajacos – Fiddle
- Camille Harrison – Background vocals
- Tom Hemby – Acoustic guitar, dobro, electric guitar, mandolin
- Phil Kristianson – Piano
- Jerry Kroon – Drums
- Terry McMillan – Harmonica
- Duncan Mullins – Bass
- Matt Pearson – Bass
- Holly Smith – Background vocals, lead vocals
- Margo Smith – Background vocals, lead vocals
- Dawn Thomas – Background vocals

Technical personnel

- Barry Dixon – Engineer
- Craig Hanson – Engineer, mixing
- Terry McMillan – Percussion
- Gary McSpadden – Producer
- Scott Sheriff – Engineer, keyboard overdubs
- D. Bergen White – String arrangement, conductor, strings

== Release history ==
Region	Date	Format	Label	Ref.
United States	1991	Compact disc	Homeland Records	
