= Wishes (Margo Smith & Holly album) =

Studio album by Margo Smith & Holly
- Released: 1992
- Studio: Suite 16
- Genre: Country; Christian country
- Length: 32:03
- Label: Homeland
- Producer: Bobby All; Robin Mew

Margo Smith chronology
Just the Beginning (1991)	Wishes (1992)	Nothing to Lose (2005)

Wishes is a studio album by American country artist Margo Smith and her daughter, Holly. It was released via Homeland Records in 1992 and contained ten tracks. All of the songs were duets between the duo and were a collection of Christian country material. It was the duo's second album together.

== Background, content and release ==
Margo Smith first found success as a country performer during the late 1970s. Recording for 20th Century Fox and later Warner Bros., she had major hits with songs like "There I Said It", "Don't Break the Heart That Loves You" and "Still a Woman". After her chart success faded, Smith recorded for independent record labels during the 1980s. In the early 1990s, Smith formed a Christian/gospel duo with her daughter, Holly Smith. Wishes was the duo's second album together, after their first was released in 1991. The album contained a total of ten tracks, several of which were composed by either Margo or Holly Smith. The project was cut at the Suite 16 recording studio, located in Nashville, Tennessee. Sessions were produced by Bobby All and Robin Mew.

Wishes was first released in 1992 on Homeland Records, a subsidiary of Word Records. The album was originally issued as a compact disc. In 2010, the album was re-released to digital sites via Mansion Entertainment. The album received a total of two stars from AllMusic. The album's release would bring success for the Smith duo. Their songs would later find success on contemporary Christian radio, however, no specific singles are mentioned. They would continue collaborating through the 1990s and release more music as a duo.

== Track listing ==
Wishes (CD and digital versions)
No.	Title	Writer(s)	Length
1.	"When the World Turns on Me"	Joe Collins; Michael Logiudice	2:56
2.	"Don't Let the Devil Dance"	Jerry Haynes; Holly Smith; Margo Smith	2:39
3.	"They See My Daddy in Me"	Haynes	3:51
4.	"Daddy Never Lied"	Haynes; M. Smith	2:59
5.	"Wishes"	Haynes; H. Smith; M. Smith	3:55
6.	"Better Saved Than Sorry"	Randy Archer; Haynes	3:03
7.	"Don't Kill the Wounded"	James Ranger	3:08
8.	"At the Feet of Jesus"	Joel Lindsey; Jerry Salley	3:48
9.	"Love Is a Tool"	Danny Crawford; Jerry Riggins	2:32
10.	"Church Bells"	H. Smith; M. Smith	3:12
Total length:			32:03

== Personnel ==
All credits are adapted from the liner notes of Just the Beginning.

Musical personnel

- Bobby All – Acoustic guitar
- Kelly Back – Electric guitar
- Glen Duncan – Fiddle
- Bruce Haynes – Background vocals, gut string guitar
- Dirk Johnson – Keyboards, piano
- Jerry Kroon – Drums
- Robin Mew – Background vocals, bass, bass guitar, gut string guitar
- Gary Prim – Piano
- Scott Sanders – Dobro, steel guitar
- Holly Smith – Background vocals, lead vocals
- Margo Smith – Background vocals, lead vocals
- John Willis – Electric guitar

Technical personnel

- Bobby All – Producer
- Jerry Kroon – Percussion
- Russell Mauldin – Conductor, string arrangements
- Robin Mew – Associate producer, engineer
- Rick Salyer – Engineer
- Jimmy Tarbutton – Engineer

== Release history ==
Region	Date	Format	Label	Ref.
United States	1992	Compact disc	Homeland Records	
United States	2010	Digital download; streaming	Mansion Entertainment	
