= Song Bird (Margo Smith album) =

Studio album by Margo Smith
- Released: July 1976
- Recorded: January – March 1976
- Studio: Columbia Recording Studio
- Genre: Country; country pop
- Label: Warner Bros.
- Producer: Norro Wilson

Margo Smith chronology
Margo Smith (1975)	Song Bird (1976)	Happiness (1977)

Singles from Song Bird
- 1. "Save Your Kisses for Me" Released: May 1976

Song Bird is a studio album by American country music artist Margo Smith. It was released in July 1976 via Warner Bros. Records and was produced by Norro Wilson. Songbird was the third studio recording of Smith's music career. The album contained a total of ten tracks, including the single release, "Save Your Kisses for Me." The album would reach chart positions and the single would become a major hit.

== Background and content ==
In 1975, Margo Smith had her first major hit with "There I Said It." A corresponding album was also released via 20th Century Fox Records. However, the label closed its doors at the end of the year. In 1976, Smith signed with Warner Bros. Records instead. Under the production of Norro Wilson, Smith began recording her next album. Sessions for the album took place between January and March 1976 at the Columbia Recording Studio, located in Nashville Tennessee. Song Bird consisted of ten tracks, four of which were penned by Smith herself. It also included cover versions of "Save Your Kisses for Me," which was first a pop hit for Brotherhood of Man. Also included were covers of Ray Price's "Heartaches by the Number," Dottie West's "Six Weeks Every Summer (Christmas Every Other Year)" and Jean Shepard's "Safe in These Lovin' Arms of Mine."

== Release and chart performance ==
Song Bird was released in July 1976 via Warner Bros. Records. The project marked the third studio release of Smith's career. It was distributed as a vinyl LP, containing five songs on each side of the record. Song Bird was among 14 albums of new material issued by Warner Bros. Records in July 1976. The label promoted the album, along with its additional country music releases that month, which included Buck Owens' Buck 'Em and Doug Kershaw's Ragin' Cajun. Song Bird peaked at number 34 on the Billboard Top Country Albums chart in 1976, becoming her second LP to reach a charting position. The album's only single was Smith's cover of "Save Your Kisses for Me," which was issued by Warner Bros. in May 1976. The song eventually peaked at number ten on the Billboard Hot Country Singles chart, becoming the second top ten hit of her career.

== Track listing ==
Side one
No.	Title	Writer(s)	Length
1.	"Heartaches by the Number"	Harlan Howard	3:12
2.	"Six Weeks Every Summer, Christmas Every Other Year"	Fran Powers	3:11
3.	"I'm About to Do It Again"	Margo Smith	2:32
4.	"Let's Have a Hand for the Little Lady"	Smith	3:06
5.	"Safe in These Loving Arms"	Emily Mitchell; Billy Sherrill; Norro Wilson	2:20

Side two
No.	Title	Writer(s)	Length
1.	"Save Your Kisses for Me"	Tony Hiller; Lee Sheriden; Martin Lee	3:04
2.	"Get Me My Crying Towel"	Smith	2:53
3.	"My Happiness"	Betty Peterson Blasco; Borney Bergantine	2:55
4.	"When, Where and Why"	Smith	2:02
5.	"Foot Stompin'"	Wilson	2:34

== Personnel ==
All credits are adapted from the liner notes of Song Bird.

Musical and technical personnel

- Lou Bradley – Engineer
- Ivan Nagy – Photography
- Margo Smith – Lead vocals, background vocals
- Norro Wilson – Producer

== Charts ==
Chart (1976)	Peak position
US Top Country Albums (Billboard)	34

== Release history ==
Region	Date	Format	Label	Ref.
United States	July 1976	Vinyl	Warner Bros. Records	
