= Granoff =

Granoff may refer to:

- Phyllis Granoff, a professor at Yale University;
- Jonathan Granoff, president of the Global Security Institute;
- Granoff School of Music, a music school in Philadelphia;
- Katia Granoff, a French art dealer and writer of Russian émigré origins.
