= Happiness (Margo Smith album) =

Studio album by Margo Smith
- Released: April 1977
- Recorded: March 1976 – February 1977
- Studio: Columbia Recording Studio
- Genre: Country
- Label: Warner Bros.
- Producer: Norro Wilson

Margo Smith chronology
Song Bird (1976)	Happiness (1977)	Don't Break the Heart That Loves You (1978)

Singles from Happiness
- 1. "Take My Breath Away" Released: September 1976; 2. "Love's Explosion" Released: January 1977; 3. "My Weakness" Released: May 1977; 4. "So Close Again" Released: August 1977

Happiness is a studio album by American country music artist Margo Smith. It was released in April 1977 via Warner Bros. Records and was produced by Norro Wilson. The album contained ten tracks that mixed country and pop arrangements, according to one critic. Four singles were released off the record, including the major hits "Take My Breath Away" and "Love's Explosion." The album itself also reached charting positions following its release.

== Background and content ==
Margo Smith had her first success on with the top ten hit "There I Said It," which was issued on 20th Century Fox Records. The label folded in 1975 and Smith signed with Warner Bros. Records the following year. She soon had another top ten hit with a cover of "Save Your Kisses for Me." Like her previous album effort, Smith worked under the production of Norro Wilson, who produced Happiness between March 1976 and February 1977. All sessions took place at the Columbia Recording Studio, located in Nashville, Tennessee. Happiness consisted of country and pop music songs, according to Jim Worbois of Allmusic. Of its country songs was a cover of "Lovesick Blues." Of its pop songs was a cover of "My Happiness," which was made successful by Connie Francis. Four tracks were self-penned by Smith herself. Of these self-penned songs was "So Close Again," which was a duet with Norro Wilson (who also co-wrote the track).

== Release and reception ==
Happiness was released in April 1977 on Warner Bros. Records. With its release, Happiness became the fourth studio project in Smith's music career. The album was distributed as a vinyl LP and a cassette, containing five songs on each side. Happiness reached number 41 on the Billboard Top Country Albums chart, becoming her third album to reach a position here. The project also included four singles released between 1976 and 1977. The first was "Take My Breath Away," which was issued in September 1976 and peaked at number seven on the Billboard Hot Country Songs chart. "Love's Explosion" was released as the second single from the album in January 1977, peaking at number 12. It was followed in May 1977 by "My Weakness," which reached number 23 on the same chart. Its final single release was "So Close Again," which only peaked at number 43 on the Billboard country list. Happiness was give three stars by Jim Worbois of Allmusic, who praised its variety of country and pop songs. However, he also found that some cover songs do not fit, such as "My Happiness."

== Track listings ==
=== Vinyl version ===
Side one
No.	Title	Writer(s)	Length
1.	"Love's Explosion"	Margo Smith; Norris D. Wilson	2:43
2.	"What Would I Do Then"	Carmol Taylor; Wilson	2:28
3.	"I Forgave (But I Forgot to Forget)"	Linda Hargrove	2:22
4.	"So Close Again" (with Norro Wilson)	James B. Shaw; Smith; Wilson	3:04
5.	"Saturday Night at the General Store"	Daniel D. Darst; Steve Davis	2:08

Side two
No.	Title	Writer(s)	Length
1.	"Take My Breath Away"	Smith; Wilson	2:49
2.	"I'd Rather Have a Heart Abused"	Smith	2:28
3.	"My Happiness"	Betty Peterson Blasco; Borney Bergantine	2:55
4.	"Lovesick Blues"	Cliff Friend; Irving Mills	2:39
5.	"My Weakness"	Smith; Wilson

=== Cassette version ===
Side one
No.	Title	Writer(s)	Length
1.	"Love's Explosion"	Smith; Wilson	2:43
2.	"What Would I Do Then"	Taylor; Wilson	2:28
3.	"I Forgave (But I Forgot to Forget)"	Hargrove	2:22
4.	"So Close Again" (with Norro Wilson)	Shaw; Smith; Wilson	3:04
5.	"My Weakness"	Smith; Wilson

Side two
No.	Title	Writer(s)	Length
1.	"Take My Breath Away"	Smith; Wilson	2:49
2.	"I'd Rather Have a Heart Abused"	Smith	2:28
3.	"My Happiness"	Blasco; Bergantine	2:55
4.	"Lovesick Blues"	Friend; Mills	2:39
5.	"Saturday Night at the General Store"	Darst; Davis	2:08

== Personnel ==
All credits are adapted from the liner notes of Happiness.

Musical personnel

- Curt Allen – Rhythm guitar
- Tommy Allsup – Tic tac bass
- Kenny Buttrey – Drums
- Jerry Carrigan – Drums
- Pete Drake – Dobro, steel guitar
- Janie Fricke – Background vocals
- Rudi Gatlin – Background vocals
- Steve Gatlin – Background vocals
- Steve Gibson – Rhythm guitar
- Tommy Jackson – Fiddle
- Sheri Kramer – Background vocals
- Bob Moore – Bass
- Hargus "Pig" Robbins – Piano
- Billy Sanford – Guitar
- Margo Smith – Lead vocals
- The Sound Seventy Singers – Background vocals
- Pete Wade – Rhythm guitar
- Bobby Wood – Piano
- Reggie Young – Guitar

Technical personnel

- Lou Bradley – Engineer
- Brad Kanawyer – Design
- Ronnie Milsap – Sleeve notes
- Ed Thrasher – Art direction, photography
- Norro Wilson – Producer
- Bergen White – String arrangement

== Charts ==
Chart (1977)	Peak position
US Top Country Albums (Billboard)	41

== Release history ==
Region	Date	Format	Label	Ref.
United States	April 1977	Vinyl	Warner Bros. Records	
United States	April 1977	Cassette	Warner Bros. Records	
