= The Shuffle Song =

Single by Margo Smith

from the album Just Margo
- B-side: "Move Over Juanita"
- Released: November 1979
- Recorded: July 1979
- Studio: Columbia Recording Studio
- Genre: Country; traditional country
- Length: 3:29
- Label: Warner Bros.
- Songwriter(s): Mack David; Margo Smith; Norris D. Wilson
- Producer(s): Norro Wilson

Margo Smith singles chronology
"Baby My Baby" (1979)	"The Shuffle Song" (1979)	"He Gives Me Diamonds, You Give Me Chills" (1980)

"The Shuffle Song" is a song by American country music artist Margo Smith. It was composed by Smith, along with co-writers Mack David and Norris. D. Wilson (Norro Wilson). It became a major hit on the American country music charts after reaching the top 20 in 1980. The song was later featured on Smith's album, Just Margo.

== Background and content ==
In the late 1970s, Margo Smith had two number one hits on Warner Bros. Records with the songs "Don't Break the Heart That Loves You" and "It Only Hurts for a Little While." Capitalizing on her recent success, Smith made a shift towards a "sexier image" and began recording more sexually-provocative material. With this shift, she had two more hits in 1979. She then went into the studio to record her next single release titled "The Shuffle Song." The tune was composed by Smith herself, along with songwriter Mack David and her producer Norro Wilson (credited as Norro Wilson on the record's liner notes). Wilson produced the track in July 1979 at the Columbia Recording Studio, located in Nashville, Tennessee. The song was backed by traditional-sounding vocals and instrumentation including a pedal steel guitar and fiddles, according to Billboard.

== Release and reception ==
"The Shuffle Song" received positive reviews from critics. In November 1979, Billboard magazine rated it among its "Top Single Picks." In their commentary, the publication stated that Smith "strikes with a traditional sounding country tune." They concluded stating that it was a "cleverly worded number." "The Shuffle Song" was released as a single via Warner Bros. Records in November 1979. By early 1980, it had peaked at number 13 on the Billboard Hot Country Songs chart. The song ultimately became her final top 20 hit on that chart. In addition, the track peaked at number 21 on the Canadian RPM Country Songs chart. It became Smith's final chart appearance in Canada. "The Shuffle Song" was first included as a track on Smith's 1979 album Just Margo.

== Track listing ==
7" single

- "The Shuffle Song" – 3:29
- "Move Over Juanita" – 3:17

== Charts ==
Chart (1979–80)	Peak position
Canada Country Songs (RPM)	21
US Hot Country Singles (Billboard)	13
