= The Best Yet (Margo Smith album) =

Studio album by Margo Smith
- Released: 1987; 2013
- Recorded: 1987
- Studio: LSI Studios
- Genres: Country; traditional pop
- Labels: Playback; K-tel
- Producers: Jack Gale; Jim Pierce

Margo Smith chronology
Margo Smith (1986)	The Best Yet (1987)	Just the Beginning (1991)

Singles from The Best Yet
- 1. "Alone" Released: 1987; 2. "Echo Me" Released: 1988; 3. "Hold Me" Released: 1988

The Best Yet is a studio album by American country music artist Margo Smith. It was released in 1987 via Playback Records and originally contained a total of ten tracks. The album was mostly a collection of traditional pop standards and mixed in new songs as well. It would spawn a charting single 1988 and also receive positive reviews from critics.

== Background and content ==
Margo Smith had her greatest commercial success as a country artist in the late 1970s, with major hits like "Don't Break the Heart That Loves You" and "Still a Woman." She later left her record label, Warner Bros. and began releasing music through independent companies during the 1980s. Among these albums was The Best Yet. Smith recorded the project in 1987 at LSI Studios, alongside producers Jack Gale and Jim Pierce. The recording sessions for the record took place in Nashville, Tennessee. The project contained ten tracks of new material. Seven of the songs selected were cover versions originally recorded in the traditional pop music genre by various artists. Among the songs chosen was "You Belong to Me", "Love Letters in the Sand" and "Wheel of Fortune." Also included was three tracks of new material: "Alone", "I'm Only Fillin' In" and "Heart Times".

== Release and reception ==
The Best Yet was released in 1987 on Playback Records. It was originally offered as a vinyl LP, containing five songs on either side of the record. In later years, the album was re-released in a digital format via K-tel Records, containing "Echo Me" as a bonus track. Billboard magazine originally gave the record a mixed review in 1987: "Her voice sounds a little strident at times, but Smith knows how to reach the heart of some of the great pop tunes that commanded the charts before rock 'n' roll rolled in." The Best Yet originally spawned a total of two singles. Its first single was issued in 1987, "Alone". In 1988, "Hold Me" was spawned as a single. The 2013 re-working of the album included Smith's 1988 single, "Echo Me". In the single's original release, it peaked at number 77 on the Billboard Hot Country Songs chart. It is Smith's final-charting single on the country chart to date.

== Track listing ==
=== Vinyl version ===
Side one
No.	Title	Writer(s)	Length
1.	"It's a Sin to Tell a Lie"	Billy Mayhew	2:55
2.	"You Belong to Me"	Pee Wee King; Chilton Price; Redd Stewart	2:46
3.	"Hold Me"	Jack Little; Dave Oppenheim; Ira Schuster	2:34
4.	"Harbor Lights"	Hugh Williams	2:28
5.	"Love Letters in the Sand"	Charles Kenny; Nick Kenny	2:02

Side two
No.	Title	Writer(s)	Length
1.	"Someday (You'll Want Me to Want You)"	Jimmy Hodges; Hugh Starr	2:43
2.	"Wheel of Fortune"	Bennie Benjamin; George David Weiss	2:36
3.	"Alone"	Ray Griff	2:38
4.	"I'm Only Fillin' In"	not available	2:34
5.	"Heart Times"	not available	3:06

=== Digital version ===
The Best Yet (bonus track version)
No.	Title	Writer(s)	Length
1.	"It's a Sin to Tell a Lie"	Billy Mayhew	3:05
2.	"You Belong to Me"	King; Price; Stewart	2:53
3.	"Hold Me"	Little; Oppenheim; Schuster	2:37
4.	"Harbor Lights"	Williams	2:34
5.	"Love Letters in the Sand"	Kenny; Kenny	2:03
6.	"Someday (You'll Want Me to Want You)"	Hodges; Starr	2:44
7.	"Wheel of Fortune"	Benjamin; Weiss	2:42
8.	"Alone"	Griff	2:41
9.	"I'm Only Fillin' In"	not available	2:36
10.	"Heart Times"	not available	3:05

Bonus track
No.	Title	Writer(s)	Length
11.	"Echo Me"	not available	2:19

== Release history ==
Region	Date	Format	Label	Ref.
United States	1987	Vinyl	Playback Records	
United States	2013	Digital download; streaming	K-tel	
