= Ridin' High (Margo Smith album) =

Studio album by Margo Smith
- Released: 1981
- Studio: Columbia Recording Studio
- Genre: Country
- Label: Cammeron
- Producer: Richard Cammeron; Brian Fisher

Margo Smith chronology
| Diamonds and Chills (1980) | Ridin' High (1981) | The Best of the Tennessee Yodeler (1985) |

Singles from Ridin' High
- 1. "Either You're Married or You're Single" Released: March 1982; 2. "Could It Be I Don't Belong Here Anymore" Released: July 1982; 3. "Wedding Bells" Released: November 1983

Ridin' High is a studio album by American country music singer Margo Smith. It was released in 1981 via Cammeron Records and contained ten tracks of new material. The album was co-produced by Richard Cammeron and Brian Fisher. It was the ninth studio release of Smith's music career and the second to be released on an independent label. Ridin' High spawned three singles that would chart the Billboard country songs survey.

== Background and content ==
Margo Smith recorded for the major label, Warner Bros. Records, during the 1970s. She had several major hits, including the number one country singles "Don't Break the Heart That Loves You" and "It Only Hurts for a Little While." However, in 1982, Smith was released from her Warner Bros. contract. After marrying businessman Richard Cammeron, the couple established the label Cammeron Records where they recorded the album Ridin' High. The album was produced at the Columbia Recording Studio in Nashville, Tennessee. The sessions were produced by Richard Cammeron and Brian Fisher. A total of ten tracks were included on the album, five of which were composed by Smith herself.

== Release and chart performance ==
Ridin' High was released in 1981 on Cammeron Records. It was the ninth studio recording of Smith's music career. It was her first album to be released on an independent record label since her debut album in 1971 titled I'm a Lady. It was originally issued as a vinyl LP, containing five tracks on both sides of the record.

The project spawned three charting singles. The first single issued was "Either You're Married or You're Single." Released in March 1982, the song reached number 64 on the Billboard country songs chart. In July 1982, "Could It Be I Don't Belong Here Anymore" was issued as the album's second single and peaked at number 70 on the same chart. The final single spawned was the track "Wedding Bells." Issued in November 1983, the single peaked at number 78 on the country songs chart.

== Track listing ==
Side one
| No. | Title | Writer(s) | Length |
|---|---|---|---|
| 1. | "Wantin'-Needin', Drives Me Crazy" | Margo Smith |
| 2. | "Could It Be I Don't Belong Here Anymore" | Mack Phillips; David Zepp |
| 3. | "Without Angle" | Mike Huffman; Smith |
| 4. | "Either You're Married or You're Single" | Gene Dobbins; Tommy Rocco |
| 5. | "Payback Is Hell" | Richard Cammeron; Smith |

Side two
| No. | Title | Writer(s) | Length |
|---|---|---|---|
| 1. | "Ridin' High" | Cammeron; Smith |
| 2. | "Wedding Bells" | Claude Boone |
| 3. | "When the Heart Leads, the Feet Must Follow" | Huffman; Smith |
| 4. | "Not Never, Not Just Now" | Smith |
| 5. | "I'd Rather Be Your Used to Be Than Your Never Was" | Huffman |

== Release history ==
| Region | Date | Format | Label | Ref. |
|---|---|---|---|---|
| United States | 1981 | Vinyl | Cammeron Records | |
