= Jonathan Granoff =

American lawyer, screenwriter and lecturer

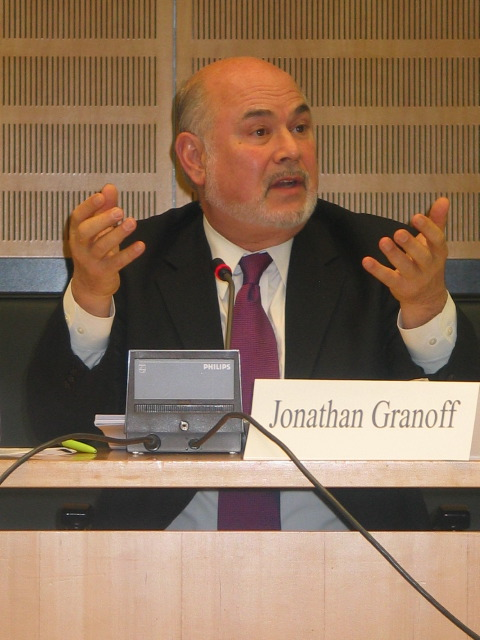
Jonathan Granoff, President of the Global Security Institute, speaking at the Article VI Forum hosted by the Middle Powers Initiative in Berlin, Germany, January 29–30, 2009

Jonathan Granoff is an American lawyer, screenwriter and lecturer, widely known as President of the Global Security Institute.

Granoff is a Senior Advisor of the American Bar Association's Committee on Arms Control and National Security and has served as Vice President of the NGO Committee on Disarmament at the United Nations. He serves on numerous governing and advisory boards including the Lawyers Committee on Nuclear Policy, the Lawyers Alliance for World Security, the Jane Goodall Institute, the Bipartisan Security Group, and the Middle Powers Initiative. He was appointed the Permanent Observer of the International Anti-Corruption Academy for the United Nations in December 2022.

He is a Trustee and Fellow of the World Academy of Art and Science and a founding member of the Human Security for All campaign, which was a joint program between the World Academy of Art and Science and the United Nations Trust Fund for Human Security.

Granoff has lectured worldwide on the legal, ethical and spiritual dimensions of human development and security, with a specific focus on the threats posed by nuclear weapons. As a screenwriter, Granoff has been featured in more than 30 publications. In 2012 at the American Bar Association in New York, Granoff interviewed actor Michael Douglas.

He has practiced law in Philadelphia as an individual practitioner, in several medium-sized firms, and as in-house counsel in a public company. He chaired the special session on Terrorism and Threats to Humanity at the Summit of Nobel Peace Laureates in Rome in 2004, where he represented the International Peace Bureau, a Nobel Peace Laureate organization. Granoff has represented the International Peace Bureau at the Nobel Peace Laureate Summits in Rome every year since 2002.

== Background ==
Granoff is the son of singer Kitty Kallen — widely known for her 1954 chart-topping solo recording '"Little Things Mean a Lot" — and pioneering television syndicator Bernard "Budd" Granoff (1920–1996).

Granoff received his Baccalaureate degree, Cum Laude, from Vassar College and Juris Doctor from Rutgers School of Law - Camden. In March 2023 Granoff was awarded the AAVC Distinguished Achievement Award for 2022 by former CBS News and NBC News Correspondent Chip Reid at Vassar College.

== Speeches and writings ==
Selected speeches and writings by Mr. Jonathan Granoff:

May 5, 2010, New York City: "A Good Framework for a Good Future" (PDF). presented at "Principles, Values and Global Security," seminar organized by Religions for Peace.

April 19, 2010, Tehran, Iran: "Everyone" (PDF). presentation delivered at the International Conference on Nuclear Non-proliferation and Disarmament, sponsored by the Iranian Ministry of Foreign Affairs.

December 5, 2009, Hiroshima, Japan: "For Reminding Us, Thank You, Hiroshima" (PDF). presented at the symposium, "Hiroshima Strives for Nuclear Abolition: Pursuing measures to energize the 2010 NPT Review Conference," organized by the Hiroshima Peace Institute and Chugoku Shimbun.

December, 2009': "The Process of Zero" (PDF). World Policy Journal.

November 11, 2009, Berlin, Germany: "A Moment to Seize" (PDF). presented at the 10th World Summit of Nobel Laureates.

October, 2009': "The Foundation of Dignity". Tikkun Magazine.

July 16, 2009, Puntarenas, Costa Rica: "A Let Us All Be Peace Boats: Reflections on the UN, Article 26 and Costa Rica" (PDF). prepared for the Article 9 and Article 12 Peace Constitutions for Global Disarmament conference.

Spring, 2009: "The Call to a New Moral Imperative". Archived from the original on 2013-02-06. Published in Reflections, Yale Divinity School.

April 3, 2009, New York City: "Achieving the Entry-Into-Force of the Comprehensive Nuclear Test-Ban Treaty: What UN Member States Can Do Now" (PDF). Presentation at the special briefing and strategy session, Contributions of the United Nations System in Advancing the Entry-Into-Force of the Comprehensive Test-Ban Treaty, co-sponsored by the Permanent Mission of Austria to the United Nations and the Global Security Institute.

April 16–17, 2009, Rome, Italy: "Preserving and Strengthening the Nuclear Non-Proliferation and Disarmament Regime" (PDF). Delivered at the Overcoming Nuclear Dangers Conference, organized by the Italian Ministry of Foreign Affairs, Nuclear Threat Initiative, and World Political Forum.

March 26, 2009, Annapolis, Maryland: "The Imperative of Preserving and Strengthening the Nuclear Non-Proliferation Treaty" (PDF). Presentation at the Spring Conference organized and convened by the Center for Strategic and International Studies (CSIS), held at the United States Naval Academy in Annapolis, Maryland.

March 17, 2009, New York City: "The Millennium Development Goals: Real Family Values". address delivered at the Millennium Development Goals Award Ceremony, General Assembly, United Nations.

January 30, 2009, Berlin, Germany: "The Justice They Deserve". transcript of remarks made at the sixth Article VI Forum meeting.

January/February 2009: "Memo to Obama: Nuclear Weapons". published in Tikkun Magazine.

October 24, 2008, New York, NY: "Galvanizing the focus: A Nuclear Weapons Convention" (PDF). speech delivered at the GSI Strategy Session on Achieving a Nuclear Weapons Convention, as part of the East West Institute conference "Seizing the Moment: A One-Day Consultation on Breakthrough Measures on Weapons of Mass Destruction and Disarmament."

September 12, 2008, Stavanger, Norway to New York, NY: Speaker at the "Millennium Development Goals Award Ceremony Uplink".

Summer 2008: "Considering Iran and its Nuclear Intentions". Archived from the original on 2009-03-25. published in Disarmament Times.

June 9–10, 2008, New Delhi, India: "Beyond Deterrence" (PDF). Presentation at International Conference, "Towards a World Free of Nuclear Weapons," hosted by the Center for Strategic and International Studies and the Indian Council for World Affairs.

April 4, 2008: "Celebrity and Social Responsibility featuring Richard Belzer". host of the Showcase Presentation at the American Bar Association Section of the International Law Spring Meeting.

March 9, 2008, Tehran, Iran: "Go Up to Go Over". Archived from the original on 2014-01-16. delivered at the Institute for Political and International Studies, organized by the Foreign Ministry of Iran.

March 30, 2008, Dublin, Ireland : "Moving Forward" (PDF). delivered at Fifth Article VI Forum of the Middle Powers Initiative.

December 19, 2007: "America Was Not Entirely Asleep at the Nuclear Switch". published in Embassy Magazine.

December 13–14, 2007, Rome, Italy: "The Axis of Responsibility" (PDF). and "Freedom from the Scourge of War". speeches delivered to the 8th Summit of Nobel Laureates.

November 20, 2007, New York, NY: "The Axis of Responsibility. Addressing the Critical Global Issues of the 21st Century" (PDF). an address to Inter-Parliamentary Union at the Chamber of the Economic and Social Council.

November 7, 2007: "Addressing the Nuclear Threat". published in The Courier-Journal.

September 26, 2007: "The Nuclear Nonproliferation Treaty and its 2005 Review Conference: A Legal and Political Analysis" (PDF). published in the New York University School of Law Journal of International Law and Politics.

July 18, 2007, New York, NY:"A High-Level Panel For Peace in the Highest Places" (PDF). Presentation to the Secretary-General's Advisory Board on Disarmament Matters.

May 3, 2007, Washington, DC: "Nuclear Weapons: Resolving Iran, Reviewing Iraq" (PDF). briefing before the United States House of Representatives Taskforce on Non-proliferation.

May 4, 2007, Washington, DC: Moderator of Special Showcase Presentation with "Ambassador Thomas Graham and Dr. Hans Blix" (PDF). at the American Bar Association Section of the International Law Spring Meeting.

March 28, 2007, Washington, DC: "Strengthening the Nuclear Non-proliferation Treaty". delivered at Beyond Nuclear Weapons Conferences hosted by the Project for Nuclear Awareness.

March 15, 2007, Washington, DC: "Cooperative Security" (PDF). prepared Remarks to the Organization of American States.

February 10, 2007: "Time for US Values for the Heavens" (PDF). published at CommonDreams.org.

2007: "Reverence for Life" (PDF). in Ives, D. (Ed.), Reverence for Life: Albert Schweitzer's Relevance Today. Cambridge Scholars Press.
