= The Moody Brothers =

US musical group

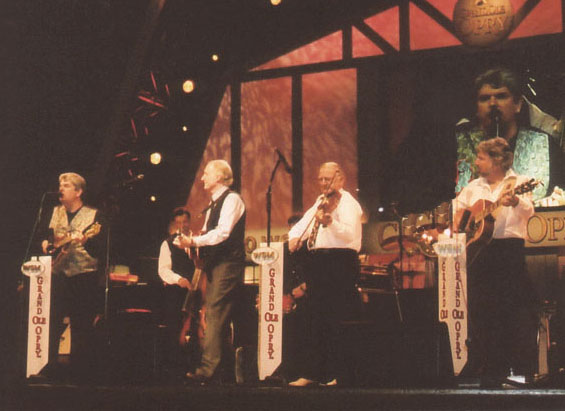
- The Moody Brothers on the Grand Ole Opry (2006)

Background information
- Origin: Charlotte, North Carolina, U.S.
- Genres: Country, bluegrass, folk, alternative country, southern gospel
- Years active: 1985-present
- Labels: Lamon
- Members: Carlton Moody; Dave Moody; Trent Moody
- Website: www.moodybrothers.com

The Moody Brothers are an Americana country music trio who gained prominence in 1985 when they were nominated for a Grammy Award for their instrumental performance of the classic fiddle tune "Cotton Eyed Joe". This trio of brothers, Carlton Moody, Dave Moody, and Trent Moody were nominated for a second Grammy in 1990 and won three International Country Music Awards in Europe.

== History ==
During the 1980s, The Moody Brothers made numerous appearances on the Grand Ole Opry in Nashville, TN and The Nashville Network's Nashville Now, On Stage and other music programs. They also performed at the White House for Presidents Ronald Reagan and George H. W. Bush.

In 1988, the Moodys recorded a historic album in Prague, Czechoslovakia with Jiří Brabec and Country Beat. The album Friends was the first such cooperative production between an American company, Lamon Records and what was then a communist state-owned record label Supraphon. The project earned critical acclaim and won the Moodys, along with the producers, engineers and studios involved in the project the Ampex Golden Reel Award.

The Walt Disney Company offered the Moodys a featured concert performance role at Disneyland Paris in France when the park and entertainment complex opened in 1992. The trio continued to gain international success with their music throughout the '90s.

Since their time in France, the Moodys have mainly focused on individual careers in the new millennium. Carlton Moody is the lead singer and guitarist for Burrito Deluxe. Dave Moody is a Dove Award winning artist/songwriter/producer and indie filmmaker. Trent Moody teaches music in Indian Trail, NC and has a new fiddle album recorded with his father Dwight Moody. Trent Moody has a son named Harrison, who is also a musician. The brothers perform together occasionally, and have earned several Dove Award nominations for their recordings on their own and with George Hamilton IV.
