= In the Chapel in the Moonlight =

1936 song by Billy Hill

Single by Kitty Kallen

from the album Little Things Mean a Lot
- B-side: "Take Everything But You"
- Released: May 25, 1954
- Recorded: 1954
- Genre: Traditional pop
- Length: 2:50
- Label: Decca
- Songwriter: Billy Hill

Kitty Kallen singles chronology
"Little Things Mean a Lot" (1954)	"In the Chapel in the Moonlight" (1954)	"Take Everything But You" (1954)

"In the Chapel in the Moonlight" is a 1936 popular song written by Billy Hill, and first performed by Shep Fields.

Other successful recordings in 1936–37 were by Richard Himber, Mal Hallett and Ruth Etting. In France, the song is popularised by Leo Marjane and Lucienne Delyle.

"Chapel in the Moonlight"

Single by The Bachelors

from the album The Bachelors' Hits Vol. 2
- B-side: "The Old Wishing Well"
- Released: September 1965 (US); October 1965 (UK)
- Recorded: 1965
- Genre: Traditional pop
- Length: 2:50
- Label: London (US); Decca (UK)
- Songwriter: Billy Hill

The Bachelors singles chronology
"Marie" (1965)	"Chapel in the Moonlight" (1965)	"Hello, Dolly!" (1966)

"In the Chapel in the Moonlight"

Single by Dean Martin

from the album Welcome to My World
- B-side: "Welcome to My World"
- Released: June 14, 1967
- Recorded: 1967
- Genre: Traditional pop
- Length: 2:35
- Label: Reprise
- Songwriter: Billy Hill

Dean Martin singles chronology
"Lay Some Happiness on Me" (1967)	"In the Chapel in the Moonlight" (1967)	"Little Ole Wine Drinker, Me" (1967)

== Notable cover versions ==
"In the Chapel in the Moonlight" has been performed by many artists. Among the most notable are:

- The song was revived in 1954 by Kitty Kallen, accompanied by the Jack Pleis Orchestra recorded at Decca Records on December 30, 1953. Her recording reached number four on the Billboard charts and number five on the Cash Box Best Selling Record chart.
- The Bachelors hit the Top 40 in the UK in 1965.
- In 1967, Dean Martin's version peaked at number 25 on the Billboard Hot 100 as well as spending three weeks atop the easy listening chart in August 1967.

== See also ==
- List of number-one adult contemporary singles of 1967 (U.S.)
