= Diamonds and Chills =

Studio album by Margo Smith
- Released: September 1980
- Recorded: March 1980
- Studio: Woodland (Nashville, Tennessee)
- Genre: Country; country pop
- Label: Warner Bros.
- Producer: David Barnes

Margo Smith chronology
Just Margo (1979)	Diamonds and Chills (1980)	Ridin' High (1981)

Singles from Diamonds and Chills
- 1. "My Guy" Released: June 1980; 2. "He Gives Me Diamonds, You Give Me Chills" Released: September 1980

Diamonds and Chills is a studio album by American country music artist Margo Smith. It was released in September 1980 via Warner Bros. Records and was produced by David Barnes. It was Smith's eighth studio album released in her music career and her last to be released on the Warner Bros. label. The project spawned two singles, which charted on the country singles survey in 1980: "My Guy" and the title track. Diamonds and Chills was reviewed favorably by critics.

== Background and content ==
After several major hits in the 1970s, Margo Smith transitioned towards a "sexier" marketing persona, according to writer Sandra Brennan. In 1979, she had two major hits, including the top ten song "Still a Woman" which helped signify this transition. Smith attempted to carry her new image into 1980 with the recording of a new studio record, Diamonds and Chills. The album was recorded at the Woodland Sound Studios, located in Nashville, Tennessee. The sessions were held in March 1980 and was produced by David Barnes. Diamonds and Chills contained ten tracks. Unlike previous records, the project did not include any songs composed by Smith herself. The album featured a cover of Mary Wells' "My Guy," Brenda Holloway's "Every Little Bit Hurts," Parker McGee's "I Just Can't Say No to You" and Chris Thompson's "If You Remember Me".

== Release and reception ==
Professional ratings
Review scores
Source	Rating
Allmusic	3/5 stars
Billboard	Favorable

Diamonds and Chills was released in September 1980 on Warner Bros. Records. It marked the eighth studio recording of Smith's music career and her sixth for the Warner label. The album was originally distributed as a vinyl LP containing five tracks on either side of the record. The album was also offered as a cassette with an identical track listing. Diamonds and Chills received a positive response from Billboard magazine, who named the record among its "top album picks" in September 1980. Reviewers praised the album's balance of country and pop musical styles. They also praised the album as a whole: "Smith shifts from her former traditional country inflections into a lighter sultry updated style that is comfortably engaging." In later years, the record received three out of five stars from AllMusic.

The album also spawned two singles that were released in 1980. The album's cover of "My Guy" was released as the project's first single in June 1980. The song reached number 43 on the Billboard Hot Country Singles chart later that year. The album's title track ("You Give Me Diamonds, He Gives Me Chills") was issued as the record's second single in September 1980. The song peaked at number 52 on the Billboard country chart.

== Track listing ==
=== Vinyl and cassette versions ===
Side one
No.	Title	Writer(s)	Length
1.	"He Gives Me Diamonds, You Give Me Chills"	Don Goodman; Mary Ann Kennedy	2:54
2.	"Every Little Bit Hurts"	Ed Cobb	3:00
3.	"As Far as My Heart Can See"	Larry Keith; Johnny Slate	2:20
4.	"Let Me Be Her Tonight"	Goodman; Kennedy; Pam Rose	2:55
5.	"Any Way That You Want Me"	Chip Taylor	3:11

Side two
No.	Title	Writer(s)	Length
1.	"My Guy"	William Robinson	2:48
2.	"If You Remember Me"	Marvin Hamlisch; Carole Bayer Sager	2:57
3.	"Ain't No Need to Rush the Feeling"	Eric Saxon	3:28
4.	"I Just Can't Say No to You"	Steve Gibson; Parker McGee	3:02
5.	"Love Me Goodbye"	Goodman; Kennedy; Rose	3:30

== Personnel ==
All credits are adapted from the liner notes of Diamonds and Chills.

Musical personnel

- Lea Jane Berinati – Background vocals
- Steve Brantley – Background vocals
- Tom Brannon – Background vocals
- Jerry Carrigan – Drums
- Mark Casstevens – Acoustic guitar
- Johnny Christopher – Acoustic guitar
- Jackie Cusic – Background vocals
- Bruce Dees – Background vocals
- Shane Keister – Keyboards
- John Komrada – Flugelhorn
- Sheri Kramer – Background vocals
- The Shelly Kurland Strings – String section
- Barry McDonald – Flugelhorn
- Donna Sheridan Levine – Background vocals
- Lisa Silver – Background vocals
- Margo Smith – Lead vocals
- Diane Tidwell – Background vocals
- Paul Uhrig – Bass
- Reggie Young – Electric guitar

Technical personnel

- David Barnes – Producer
- Bobbe Joy – Makeup
- Danny M. Hilley – Engineer
- Rick McCollister – Mastering
- Patty Michels – Fashion stylist
- Farrell Morris – Percussion
- Tim Ritchie – Art direction, design
- Mitsu Sato of Platoon – Hair stylist
- Hank Williams – Mastering
- Dick Zimmerman – Photography

== Release history ==
Region	Date	Format	Label	Ref.
United States	September 1980	Vinyl; cassette	Warner Bros. Records	
