= Jimmie Crane =

- Birth name: Loreto Domenic Fraieli
- Born: August 1, 1910
- Died: April 3, 1998 (aged 87)
- Occupations: Songwriter; business owner
- Years active: 1920–1988

Jimmie Crane (1910–1998; born Loreto Domenic Fraieli) was an American songwriter and business owner from Providence, Rhode Island. He is known for composing songs performed by Glenn Miller and his Orchestra, Liberace, Doris Day, and Elvis Presley.

== Biography ==
Crane was born on August 1, 1910, as Loreto Fraieli. Crane's career as a songwriter began when "It's Great To Be An American," a song written by Crane and Ray Muffs became part of Glenn Miller and his Orchestra's repertoire in 1941. In the late 1940s, Crane met songwriter Al Jacobs, and they became a songwriting team. Their songs began to gain popularity with Tommy Mara's recording "I'll Try" and "Bella Mia," with "Bella Mia" being their first charting song in 1953.

In 1954, their popular song "If I Give My Heart to You", written with Milt Gabler, was recorded by Connee Boswell. Denise Lor and Doris Day followed with their own renditions that year. The song would later be recorded by Bing Crosby, Duke Ellington, Kitty Kallen, and Nat King Cole, among others. That year, "I Need You Now", also written by Jimmie Crane and Al Jacobs, was recorded by Eddie Fisher and reached #1 on the Billboard and Cash Box charts on November 3, 1954. The song was also featured on Your Hit Parade. Crane and Jacobs' song "Hurt" was first recorded by Roy Hamilton in 1954 and gained popularity on the R&B Charts. The song would be covered most popularly by Timi Yuro and enter the Billboard Top 100. Elvis Presley covered "Hurt" shortly before his death. Among others, Bobby Vinton, Peabo Bryson, Liberace, and Carly Simon recorded versions of the song.

During his career as a songwriter, Crane also started and managed a jewelry company, Colonial Novelty, in Providence, Rhode Island. Crane was convicted of federal income tax evasion involving Colonial Novelty in 1976. Crane continued writing music throughout his life. He died in 1998.

== Awards ==
- 1982 - Rhode Island Heritage Hall of Fame
- 1987 - ASCAP Most Performed Country Songs
- 2013 - Rhode Island Music Hall of Fame

== Selected discography ==
Charting singles written by Jimmie Crane
Year	Song	Artist	Chart	Writers
1971	"Bella Mia"	Tommy Mara	#71 (1 week)	Crane, Jacobs
1960	"Come Back"	Jimmy Clanton	#60 (9 weeks, Music Vendor/Record World)	Crane, Phil Tucker
1956	"Every Day of My Life"	The McGuire Sisters	#26 (1 week, MV/RW)	Crane, Jacobs
1972	"Every Day of My Life"	Bobby Vinton	#13 (16 weeks, MV/RW)	Crane, Jacobs
1954	"Hurt"	Roy Hamilton	#8 (7 weeks, R&B MV/RW); #71 (9 weeks MV/RW)	Crane, Jacobs
1961	"Hurt"	Timi Yuro	#4 (12 weeks, MV/RW) & #3 (13 weeks, MV)	Crane, Jacobs
1966	"Hurt"	Little Anthony and the Imperials	#51 (6 weeks, Billboard)	Crane, Jacobs
1975	"Hurt"	The Manhattans	#70 (6 weeks, Cash Box)	Crane, Jacobs
1975	"Hurt"	Connie Cato	#14 (14 weeks, Billboard Country & Western)	Crane, Jacobs
1976	"Hurt"	Elvis Presley	#28 (11 weeks, Billboard)	Crane, Jacobs
1959	"I Can't Get You Out of My Heart"	Al Martino	#25 (20 weeks, MV/RW)	Crane, Daniel DiMinno
1964	"I Can't Get You Out of My Heart"	Al Martino	#99 (2 weeks, Billboard)	Crane, Daniel DiMinno
1960	"I Can't Say Goodbye"	The Fireflies	#49 (11 weeks Cash Box)	Crane, Phil Tucker, Paul DeMaya
1954	"I Need You Now"	Eddie Fisher (singer)	#1 (23 weeks, Billboard)	Crane, Jacobs
1960	"I Need You Now"	Joni James	#98 (1 week, Billboard)	Crane, Jacobs
1969	"I Need You Now"	Ronnie Dove	#90 (4 weeks MV/RW)	Crane, Jacobs
1954	"If I Give My Heart To You"	Doris Day	#1 (15 weeks MV/RW)	Jimmie Crane, Al Jacobs, Milt Gabler as Jimmy Brewster
1954	"If I Give My Heart To You"	Denise Lor	#13 (14 weeks, Billboard)	Jimmie Crane, Al Jacobs, Milt Gabler as Jimmy Brewster
1954	"If I Give My Heart To You"	Connee Boswell	#20 (5 weeks, Billboard)	Jimmie Crane, Al Jacobs, Milt Gabler as Jimmy Brewster
1959	"If I Give My Heart To You"	Kitty Kallen	#34 (12 weeks, Billboard)	Jimmie Crane, Al Jacobs, Milt Gabler as Jimmy Brewster
1979	"If I Give My Heart To You"	Margo Smith	#10 (13 weeks, Billboard Country & Western)	Jimmie Crane, Al Jacobs, Milt Gabler as Jimmy Brewster
1953	"I'll Try"	Tommy Mara	#67 (1 week, Hot Charts)	Crane, Jacobs
1955	"My Believing Heart"	Joni James	#34 (13 weeks MV/RW)	Crane, Jacobs
1959	"So Close to my Heart"	Kathy Linden	#84 (4 weeks, Cash Box)	Crane, Jacobs, Tucker

This table is based largely on the discography compiled from "The Jimmie Crane Songography" written by Alan "Big Al" Pavlow and Rick Bellaire in honor of Jimmie Crane's 2013 induction into the Rhode Island Music Hall of Fame.
