= I'm a Lady (album) =

Studio album by Bette Smith
- Released: 1971
- Genre: Country
- Label: Nashville North
- Producer: Floyd Whited

Bette Smith chronology
I'm a Lady (1971)	Margo Smith (1975)

Singles from I'm a Lady
- 1. "I'm a Lady" Released: July 1971

I'm a Lady is a studio album by Bette Smith, who would later become commercially successful under the name Margo Smith. It was the debut studio recording in her career and was released on Nashville North Records. The album contained 12 tracks of new material, including several songs penned by Smith herself. The title track would also be released as a single in 1971.

== Background, content and release ==
In 1971, Bette Smith was an elementary school teacher in New Carlisle, Ohio. Musically inclined, she often created songs for her students to sing while they were in class. Smith eventually began singing at functions outside of school and developed a following. With the assistance of husband Ken Smith, she went to Nashville, Tennessee to record her first studio album titled I'm a Lady. The project was produced by Floyd Whited and engineered by Brian Fisher. The album was a collection of 12 tracks. Nine of the album's songs were written by Smith herself, including "Ode to the Confessor" and "Say You Love Me". I'm a Lady also included covers of gospel songs, such as "In the Garden".

I'm a Lady was released in 1971 on Nashville North Records. It was originally issued as a vinyl LP, containing six songs on each side. The album's title track was spawned as its only single, which was released in July 1971 on Sugar Hill Records. Smith continued to maintain her full-time teaching career following the record's release and continued performing shows in the Ohio area. In subsequent years, she would later adopt the stage name of Margo Smith and have commercial success as a country music artist during the late 1970s.

== Track listing ==
Credits are extracted from the liner notes of I'm a Lady. All tracks are composed by Bette Smith, unless otherwise noted.

Side one
No.	Title	Writer(s)	Length
1.	"Ode to the Confessor"		2:30
2.	"Slow Billy Slow"		2:57
3.	"I'm a Teachin' Whomper Stomper"		2:35
4.	"I'm a Lady (Part 1)"		1:31
5.	"Say You Love Me"		1:40
6.	"In the Garden"	traditional	2:11

Side two
No.	Title	Writer(s)	Length
1.	"Teardrops"		3:39
2.	"Middle Class Blues"		2:15
3.	"Love Now Pay Later"		2:42
4.	"I'm a Lady (Part 2)"		1:31
5.	"Some Day"	not available	2:17
6.	"Whole World in His Hands"	traditional	1:24

== Personnel ==
All credits are adapted from the liner notes of I'm a Lady.

- Brian Fisher – Engineer
- Bette Smith – Lead vocals
- Floyd Whited – Producer

== Release history ==
Region	Date	Format	Label	Ref.
United States	1971	Vinyl	Nashville North Records	
