= Margo Smith (1975 album) =

Studio album by Margo Smith
- Released: September 1975
- Recorded: January–May 1975
- Genre: Country
- Label: 20th Century Fox
- Producer: Jim Vienneau

Margo Smith chronology
| I'm a Lady (1971) | Margo Smith (1975) | Song Bird (1976) |

Singles from Margo Smith
- 1. "There I Said It" Released: March 1975; 2. "Paper Lovin'" Released: July 1975

Margo Smith is a studio album by American country music artist Margo Smith. It was released in September 1975 via 20th Century Fox Records and was produced by Jim Vienneau. The album's was Smith's second LP released in her music career and her only album to be issued on 20th Century Fox. It included two singles, notably the major hit "There I Said It." It contained ten tracks of mostly self-composed material.

== Background and content ==
Margo Smith began her adulthood as a kindergarten teacher but aspired to become a country recording artist. After recording demos and developing a following, she signed a recording contract with 20th Century Fox Records in 1975. She then began recording material for her debut studio album, which would be released on the label. The project was recorded between January and May 1975 in sessions held by producer Jim Vienneau. It was among only two recording sessions Smith would have at the label. The album contained a total of ten tracks. Seven of these tracks were composed entirely by Smith herself, such as "Tennessee Yodelers," "He Don't Love Here" and "One Sided Affair." Two tracks were composed by Jerry Foster and Bill Rice. Additionally, the song "Among My Souvenirs" was a cover of the original pop hit by Connie Francis.

== Release and chart performance ==
Margo Smith was released in September 1975 on 20th Century Fox Records. It was Smith's second studio album in her recording career. It was distributed as a vinyl LP, containing five songs on each side of the record. The album peaked at number 42 on the Billboard Top Country Albums chart shortly after its release. Two singles were included on the album that previously been release. The first single included was "There I Said It," which was first released in March 1975. The song peaked at number eight on the Billboard Hot Country Songs chart. It also peaked at number 14 on the RPM Country Songs chart in Canada. "Paper Lovin'" was the second single included on the record and was first issued in July 1975. The song reached number 30 on the Billboard country list.

== Track listing ==
Side one
| No. | Title | Writer(s) | Length |
|---|---|---|---|
| 1. | "Paper Lovin'" | Margo Smith | 2:30 |
| 2. | "Tennessee Yodelers" | Smith | 2:20 |
| 3. | "He Don't Love Here" | Smith | 2:48 |
| 4. | "An Old Memory Got in My Eye" | Jerry Foster; Bill Rice | 2:14 |
| 5. | "Baby's Hurtin'" | Smith | 2:21 |

Side two
| No. | Title | Writer(s) | Length |
|---|---|---|---|
| 1. | "There I Said It" | Smith | 2:03 |
| 2. | "I Don't Think So" | Smith | 2:37 |
| 3. | "One Sided Affair" | Smith | 2:17 |
| 4. | "Among My Souvenirs" | Edgar Leslie; Horatio Nicholls | 2:14 |
| 5. | "Go to Your Room and Play" | Foster; Rice | 2:348 |

== Personnel ==
All credits are adapted from the liner notes of Margo Smith.

Musical and technical personnel

- Herb Burnette – Photography
- Margo Smith – Lead vocals
- Mort Thomasson – Engineer
- Jim Vienneau – Producer
- Bill Ward – Graphics

== Charts ==
| Chart (1975) | Peak position |
|---|---|
| US Top Country Albums (Billboard) | 42 |

== Release history ==
| Region | Date | Format | Label | Ref. |
|---|---|---|---|---|
| United States | September 1975 | Vinyl | 20th Century Fox Records | |
