= Margo Smith =

American singer-songwriter (1939–2024)

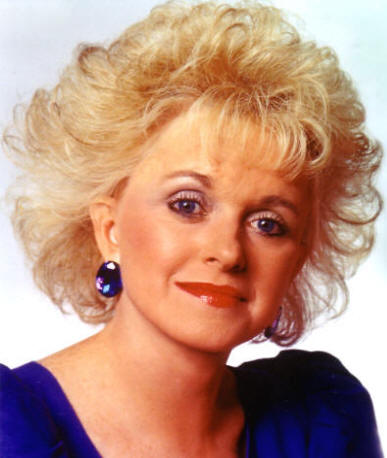
- Born: Betty Lou Miller; April 9, 1939; Dayton, Ohio, U.S.
- Died: January 23, 2024 (aged 84); Franklin, Tennessee, U.S.
- Education: Wittenberg University
- Occupations: Singer; songwriter; teacher
- Years active: 1970–2024
- Spouses: Ken Smith (divorced); Richard Cammeron (m. 1982)
- Children: 2
- Musical career
- Genres: Country; Christian
- Instruments: Vocals; Piano; Ukulele
- Labels: Nashville North; 20th Century Fox; Warner Bros.; Cammeron; Dot; MCA; Playback; Homeland; Lamon

Margo Smith (born Betty Lou Miller; April 9, 1939 – January 23, 2024) was an American country and Christian music singer–songwriter. She had several years of country success during the 1970s, which included two number one hits on the Billboard Hot Country Songs chart. In the 1990s, she transitioned towards the Christian market and released two successful albums. She is also known for her yodeling vocal skills and is often referred to as "The Tennessee Yodeler".

Smith was born and raised in Ohio. During her childhood she learned how to sing and yodel. After graduating high school, Smith chose to pursue a career in education. For nearly a decade Smith taught elementary school and started a family with her first husband. In her thirties, she decided to begin a singing career full-time and also started songwriting. In 1971, she released her first album titled I'm a Lady and developed a following. By 1975, Smith had signed with 20th Century Fox Records and had her first major hit on the country charts with the song "There I Said It." She had further hits in the 1970s with songs like "Take My Breath Away" and "Don't Break the Heart That Loves You".

In 1979, Smith released the single "Still a Woman" and made significant changes to her musical persona. The transition helped to briefly elevate Smith's commercial country music career and she had further hits. By the early 1980s, Smith regretted making stylistic changes to her career and left her recording contract. She released music independently during the 1980s while also issuing albums through major labels. In the 1990s, Smith transitioned towards Christian music and recording two albums with her daughter, Holly. The pair won awards for their collaborative music and performed for several years. In later years, Smith continued performing as a solo act at her residence in Florida.

== Early life ==
Smith was born Betty Lou Miller in Dayton, Ohio, on April 9, 1939. For most of her career, Smith told the press that she was born in 1942, however it was later confirmed she was born in 1939. According to relatives, Smith lied about her age to make herself appear younger. She was raised on a farm outside the Dayton city limits. She had been interested in performing since childhood, especially after watching country singers on the local television show, Midwestern Hayride. At an early age, she learned how to yodel, which became a part of her performing style. In high school, she sang as part of a trio called the Apple Sisters. However, Smith chose to pursue teaching professionally. She graduated from Wittenberg University with a major in elementary education. After graduating, she taught kindergarten for five years and then briefly taught third grade for two years. She then returned to kindergarten by the early 1970s. Although teaching full-time, Smith found ways to incorporate music into her classroom. She often wrote songs that would be embedded into her lessons. Learning to perform the ukulele, Smith often used it to calm energetic children in her class.

== Career ==
=== 1970–1975: Country beginnings and success at 20th Century Fox ===
Smith started performing professionally in her mid thirties. Under her married name, Bette Smith, she began singing at PTA meetings and on local radio broadcasts. Her performances developed a local following and she eventually recorded a demo record. Under the same name she released her debut album in 1971 titled I'm a Lady. The record was issued on Nashville North Records and contained a total of 12 tracks. Eight of the album's songs were composed by Smith herself and also featured covers of gospel recordings, including "In the Garden." Smith also released four singles on the Chart and Sugar Hill labels during this period. At the same time, Smith maintained her full-time teaching career, working at Westlake Elementary School in New Carlisle, Ohio. She also took several graduate courses and painted landscapes during her free time.

In 1975, Smith signed with 20th Century Fox Records and began recording under the name Margo Smith. Her first release for the label was the single "There I Said It." The self-composed song became a major hit, reaching number eight on the Billboard Hot Country Songs chart. It also climbed into the top 20 of the RPM Country Singles chart in Canada. In September 1975, her eponymous debut album was issued on 20th Century Fox and included ten self-penned tracks. The project was also her first to chart on the Billboard country albums list. Later that year, Smith's next single, "Paper Lovin'", reached the top 40 of the country songs survey. Following its release, 20th Century Fox announced the closing of its Nashville division. Smith was soon left without a record label by the end of 1975.

=== 1976–1980: Peak success and image metamorphosis ===
In 1976, Smith signed with Warner Bros. Records and began working under the production of record producer Norro Wilson. Her first hit with the label was a cover of Brotherhood of Man's "Save Your Kisses for Me." The song reached the top ten of the Billboard country singles survey in 1976. Her second studio album was also issued in 1976 titled, Song Bird. The record featured four songs written by Smith, along with covers of songs by Ray Price and Dottie West. Song Bird peaked in the top 40 of the Billboard country albums survey. In 1977, Smith's self-penned single, "Take My Breath Away," reached number seven on the Billboard chart. The song was included on her third studio album titled Happiness. Jim Worbois of AllMusic rated the project at three stars, calling it "a collection of songs that constantly crosses the line between country and pop." Three more singles were spawned from the album, including the top 20 hit, "Love's Explosion," and a duet with producer Norro Wilson.

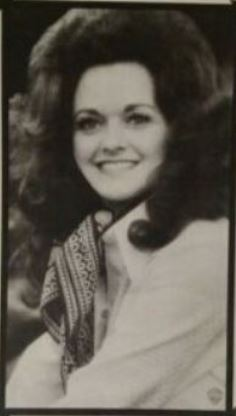
Smith in a trade ad for Billboard magazine, 1977.

In 1978, Warner Bros. released two singles by Smith that became number one singles on the Billboard country songs survey. Both "Don't Break the Heart That Loves You" and "It Only Hurts for a Little While" reached the top spot and had previously been pop hits a decade prior to Smith's cover. Her next single release was also a pop cover: "Little Things Mean a Lot." The song reached number three on the country songs chart. All three tracks also reached top ten positions on the RPM chart in Canada. The songs were issued on Smith's fifth studio album, Don't Break the Heart That Loves You. The album included a mixture of cover tunes and original recordings, including a self-penned track by Smith. The album was her highest-charting record in the United States, reaching number 27 on the Billboard country albums survey in 1978. Allmusic gave the project a three-star rating. Others took notice of Smith's singing style with the album's release. Writers Mary A. Bufwack and Robert K. Oermann remarked of her musical image during this period as being "housewifey," while also highlighting the "Jean Arthur purr in her voice."

In 1979, Smith felt her music lacked an identity of its own. Together, with songwriter Mack David and producer Norro Wilson, she wrote a song that would alter her artistic image. Titled "Still a Woman," the song focused on the marital needs facing middle-aged women, according to an excerpt from Billboard magazine. Smith also spoke of the song in the same interview: "I wanted to write a song that said 'hey, even though I may have a few children and a few gray hairs, I'm just as good as I ever was'." Released as a single, it reached number seven on the Billboard country list and the top 20 of the RPM chart in 1979. The song was released on a similarly themed album called A Woman. The project peaked at number 36 on the country albums chart. Writer Greg Adams described A Woman as having "a mildly adventurous spirit." Kurt Wolff commented that A Woman made Smith into "a middle-aged sexpot." The album would also produce a second single in 1979. Smith's cover of "If I Give My Heart to You" would reach the top ten of the Billboard country chart in 1979.

Smith's new musical style brought further career changes. She began incorporating a new concert style that included "increasingly flashy" stage shows, according to Kurt Wolff. She also included stage choreography and spoke openly about sex in interviews. "Sex is a part of every woman and if she says it ain't, she's a liar. That's the way I feel," she explained in 1980. Her career persona helped increase her fan club, which began to include a larger female audience. She also received more concert work, opening for larger country acts with her band Night Flight. She continued the same image with her next album release titled Just Margo (1979). The album's cover featured Smith wearing just a satin robe. Sales in Canada brought the album to the number 14 spot on the RPM Country Albums survey in 1979. It also produced the top 20 country hit, "The Shuffle Song," which Smith co-wrote. She transitioned into 1980 with the album Diamonds and Chills, whose album cover displayed Smith with a "plunging neckline," according to Wolff. The album received three stars from Allmusic and Billboard praised its country pop musical styles. The album's two singles, which included a cover of Mary Wells' "My Guy" peaked outside the top 40 of the North American country charts. In 1981, she collaborated with country artist Rex Allen Jr. on the duet, "Cup of Tea." Released as a single, the track reached number 12 on the country songs chart.

=== 1982–2024: Return to traditions and new musical directions ===
Smith returned to a more traditional musical image and went on to call her former "sexy" musical persona a mistake. "I had an image for singing sweet ballads and I should'a stuck with it," she recalled in 2003. Smith was released from her contract with Warner Bros. in 1982 and began recording with Cammeron Records, an independent label founded by her second husband. Through the label, Smith issued her next studio release in 1981 titled Ridin' High. The project featured ten tracks, six of which were self-penned and included co-writing credits from her husband. Four singles were released from the album that peaked outside the top 40 of the Billboard country chart, including a cover of Hank Williams' "Wedding Bells". In 1983, she released The Best of the Tennessee Yodeler, a studio record dedicated to her childhood idol, Bonnie Lou. The album featured Smith's yodeling vocal technique and was sold on television via direct-response marketing advertisements. In 1985, Dot Records revived its Nashville division and announced it would release music from veteran country performers. Among the artists chosen was Smith, who released her second eponymous studio album with Dot (along with MCA Records) in 1986. It featured re-recordings of her major hits from the 1970s.

In 1987, Smith released her next studio record titled The Best Yet. Issued on Playback Records, the album contained cover versions of traditional pop standards, such as "You Belong to Me" and "Harbor Lights." The album received a mix review from Billboard magazine. Writers found Smith's vocals to be "a little strident at times". Yet, they also noted that she "knows how to reach the heart of some of the great pop tunes that commanded the charts before rock 'n' roll rolled in." Spawned from the album was the song "Echo Me," which is her final charting single to date, peaking at number 77 on the Billboard country survey in 1988. She followed in 1989 with her second Cammeron label release, Back in the Swing.

In the early 1990s, Smith collaborated with her daughter Holly on Christian music. Together, the duo signed with Homeland Records and had success on contemporary Christian radio with several duet singles. Their first album release was 1991's Just the Beginning. It was followed in 1992 by their second collaborative release titled Wishes. In 1994, the duo was nominated for Vocal Duo of the Year at the second annual Christian Country Music Awards. The duo remained a popular touring act on the Christian music circuit as late as 1995 where they performed at a charity to raise money for disaster relief.

In later years, Smith continued performing while also venturing into other projects. She started selling a tape on her official website that taught singers how to yodel. She also mentored performers who wanted to learn the skill, including Taylor Ware, who appeared on a season of America's Got Talent. Smith also continued releasing music of her own. In 2005 she issued her most recent studio effort to date, titled Nothing to Lose. The album was released on Lamon Records. She also continued to perform in The Villages, Florida, where Smith lived year-round. In 2015, she helped raise $11,000 for The Ukulele Kids Club, a Florida organization that provides musical instruments to children in hospitals.

== Musical styles and image ==
Smith's musical style embeds the genres of Country, Christian and Country pop. Many of her Warner Bros. albums embedded country pop arrangements. Jim Worbois found that Smith's 1977 album, Happiness included songs that "would have sounded equally at home at pop radio" while finding a place with "pure country". Author Kurt Wolff noted a similar theme in her Warner Bros. albums, finding that their production often incorporated heavy elements country pop.

Smith's yodeling vocal style has also been observed by journalists and writers. Writers Mary A. Bufwack and Robert K. Oermann found that she often incorporated "quasi-yodel vocal breaks" into her singing performances. Tony Violanti of The Villages-News also found Smith's yodeling to display emotion: "Smith may have tiny physical stature but her voice can crackle with emotion." In a 2006 interview, Smith explained that her yodeling style is created from a vocal break in her voice known as a "glottal catch". "Not just anybody can yodel. You have to have the ability to have that flip in your voice," she commented.

Smith's image has also been a subject of discussion among writers. Authors of music publications have pointed out that Smith's music helped provide an outlet for middle-aged women attempting to rekindle romantic relationships. Kurt Wolff of Country Music: The Rough Guide explained that "few singers spoke so unabashedly of attempting to reinvigorate love's fading fires, especially from a woman's perspective." Wolff further commented that Smith's songwriting contained "lyrical boldness" that helped provide voice to "middle-aged couples who'd been together for years." Mary A. Bufwack and Robert K. Oermann remarked that her concerts of the late 1970s were among "the era's flashiest show queen stage routines."

== Personal life and death ==
Smith was married twice. Her first marriage was to banker Ken Smith. Together the couple had two children: Jeff (born 1964) and Holly (born 1968). For many years, the couple lived in New Carlisle, Ohio, before moving to Nashville to further her career. After she had several years of commercial success, the couple separated. Claims were later made by her former manager, Bob Fry, that she had been engaging in a romantic relationship with him. She fired Fry in 1981 and he later filed a lawsuit claiming that he was let go because she refused to have a continued sexual affair with him. In 1982, Smith wed business professional Richard Cammeron, who would become her career manager. The pair also established the record label, Cammeron Records, where Smith released several singles and albums.

In 1985, the Cammeron's Nashville home was destroyed in a house fire where they lost many material possessions. A fundraiser was later created to help the couple rebuild.

In August 2014, Smith was involved in a near fatal head-on car collision near her home in The Villages, Florida. She suffered a shattered wrist, broken ankle, and multiple bruises. She spent three months at a local rehabilitation center and made a full recovery and was expected to return to performing in December 2014. Law enforcement officials later stated that Smith would not have survived the accident if she had not been wearing a seat belt or left her car's convertible top down. In June 2016, Smith was hospitalized with double pneumonia, among other health concerns. She was sent to the intensive care unit where she remained until her health improved. Smith later made a full-recovery and began performing in the fall of 2016. "I feel as well as I can be and I feel great singing in front of all these people," she commented.

Smith died on January 23, 2024, in Franklin, Tennessee, at the age of 84, from complications of a stroke she suffered two days earlier.

== Discography ==
Studio albums

- 1971: I'm a Lady
- 1975: Margo Smith
- 1976: Song Bird
- 1977: Happiness
- 1978: Don't Break the Heart That Loves You
- 1979: A Woman
- 1979: Just Margo
- 1980: Diamonds and Chills
- 1981: Ridin' High
- 1985: The Best of the Tennessee Yodeler
- 1986: Margo Smith
- 1987: The Best Yet
- 1989: Back in the Swing
- 1991: Just the Beginning
- 1992: Wishes
- 1992: God's Bigger Than Wall Street
- 1993: Swiss, Cowboy and Country
- 2005: Nothing to Lose

== Awards and nominations ==
Year	Nominee / work	Award	Result	Ref.
1975	Record World	Top New Female Vocalist	Nominated	
1976	Academy of Country Music Awards	Most Promising Female Vocalist	Nominated	
1977	Record World	Top Female Vocalist	Nominated	
1979	Record World	Top Female Vocalist	Nominated	
1979	ASACP Awards	Country Artist of the Year	Won	
1980	Record World	Top Female Vocalist	Nominated	
1994	Christian Country Music Association Awards	Vocal Duo of the Year (with Holly Smith)	Nominated	
2001	Christian Country Music Association Awards	Living Legend Award	Won	
