= Lamon Records =

American record label

- Founded: 1962
- Founder: Dwight L Moody, Jr; Lucille Moody
- Distributors: The Orchard; Sony
- Genre: Americana, bluegrass, Christian, country
- Country of origin: U.S.
- Location: Nashville, Tennessee
- Official website: lamonrecords.com

Lamon Records is an indie record label that was established in North Carolina before moving to Nashville, Tennessee. Lamon Records concentrates its efforts in country, bluegrass, alternative and Americana music, as well as all forms of Christian music.

== History ==
Lamon Records was started in 1962 by Dwight and Lucille (Cathy) Moody. The label's first record was a 4-song EP fundraiser for a local church where Dwight Moody was the pastor. The Moodys' sons, Carlton Moody, Dave Moody and Trent Moody, known as The Moody Brothers were nominated for a Grammy Award for their instrumental performance of the classic fiddle tune "Cotton Eyed Joe". This record established Lamon as an international label. The trio of brothers would be nominated for a second Grammy on the Lamon family label in 1990 and win three International Country Music Awards in Europe.

Then, Disney offered The Moody Brothers a featured concert performance role at Disneyland Paris in France when the park and entertainment complex opened in 1992. The Moody Brothers performed for over 50 million guests during their time with Disney in France.

Dave Moody returned to America in 1998 to head up the family label. The company moved its headquarters and dLAB Studios from Charlotte, NC to Nashville, TN in 2008.

In 2004, celebrating the company's multi Dove Award nominations, three generations of the Moody family performed on the Grand Ole Opry, when founder Fiddlin' Dwight Moody joined his sons and grandchildren Joshua and Rebecca for a performance.

Lamon Records celebrated 50 years as an indie label in 2012 with performances by several of its label artists on WSM Radio's Midnite Jamboree, broadcast live from the Ernest Tubb Record Shop in Nashville.

In 2012, 2013 and 2016, Lamon Records was nominated as Country Record Label of the Year by New Music Weekly, a nationally distributed trade magazine for the radio and music industries.

== Notable releases and awards ==
In addition to the Moody Brothers' two Grammy Award nominations, Lamon's artists, producers and songwriters have won eight Dove Awards and over sixty Dove Award nominations from the members of the Gospel Music Association since 2002.

In 1989, the Moodys and Lamon recorded an album in Prague, Czechoslovakia with Jiří Brabec and Country Beat. The album "Friends" was the first such cooperative production between an American company and what was then a communist state-owned record label Supraphon. The project won the artists, producers, engineers and studios the Ampex Golden Reel Award.

In 2002, Lamon released the album George Peach by Burrito Deluxe, a country-rock band formed by the Flying Burrito Brothers original steel player Sneaky Pete Kleinow. The album was a tribute to the songs of Gram Parsons, and along with Kleinow, featured sidemen and artists including Garth Hudson of The Band, Carlton Moody of The Moody Brothers, Gillian Welch, and David Rawlings.

In 2007, Lamon's Americana recording artist Chris Berardo and the DesBerardos had their album "Ignoring All The Warning Signs..." produced by Dave Moody and Dick Neal, recognized on XM Radio's Year-end Top 40 X-Country Album Chart.

Since 2009, Lamon has released original motion picture soundtrack albums for Elevating Entertainment Motion Pictures, including Praise Band: The Movie, No Limit Kids: Much Ado About Middle School, and Season of Miracles.

In 2010, producers Dave Moody and Colin Elliott from the Irish group Live Issue recorded the album Old Fashioned Hymns and Gospel Songs...for Those Who Miss Them with George Hamilton IV and musical guests Ricky Skaggs, Marty Stuart, Gail Davis, Pat Boone, Del McCoury, Charlie Pride, Bill Anderson, Connie Smith, Tommy Cash, Cliff Barrows, George Beverly Shea and many others. The track "I'm Using My Bible for a Roadmap" featuring Del McCoury and The Moody Brothers was nominated for a 2011 Dove Award by the members of the Gospel Music Association.

In 2015, Lamon signed country artist Buddy Jewell, the first winner on the USA Network talent show Nashville Star. Jewell's first release on the label My Father's Country featured a collection of classic country songs, including Abilene, Behind Closed Doors, Galveston and other songs Jewell grew up listening to his father sing. The album was produced by Dave Moody, co-produced by Josh Moody.

In 2019, Lamon provided a number of licensed tracks for the movie soundtrack for All Light Will End which was distributed by Gravitas Ventures and available on Netflix

== Current and Former Artists (Partial) ==
- Dave Moody
- Buddy Jewell
- The Moody Brothers
- George Hamilton IV
- Margo Smith
- Jill and Julia
- Chris Berardo and the Desperados
- The Imperials
- Shari Rowe
- Whitey and Hogan with WBT Briarhoppers

== Partial list of artists appearing on Lamon releases ==
- Marty Stuart
- Ricky Skaggs
- Marti Jones
- Don Dixon
- Gail Davies
- Marty Raybon
- Del McCoury
- Charlie Pride
- Flaco Jiménez
- The Whites
- Chet Atkins
- John D. Loudermilk
- Garth Hudson of The Band
