= Love's Explosion =

Single by Margo Smith

from the album Happiness
- B-side: "So Close Again"
- Released: January 1977
- Recorded: November 1976; Columbia Recording Studio; Nashville, Tennessee, U.S.
- Genre: Country
- Length: 3:02
- Label: Warner Bros.
- Songwriter(s): James D. Shaw; Margo Smith; Norris D. Wilson
- Producer(s): Norro Wilson

Margo Smith singles chronology
"Take My Breath Away" (1976)	"Love's Explosion" (1977)	"My Weakness" (1977)

"Love's Explosion" is a song co-written and originally recorded by American country artist Margo Smith. It was issued as a single in 1977 and became a major hit on the Billboard country songs chart.

"Love's Explosion" was originally recorded in November 1976 at the Columbia Recording Studio, located in Nashville, Tennessee, United States. "Love's Explosion" was one of two songs cut during the session. The second was "So Close Again", which would later be released as the song's B-side. The session was produced by Norro Wilson, one of the song's co-writers.

"Love's Explosion" was released as a single in January 1977 via Warner Bros. Records. By mid-year, the song reached number twelve on the Billboard Hot Country Singles chart, becoming Smith's fourth major hit recording as a musical artist. It was later released on Smith's third studio album entitled Happiness (1977).

== Chart performance ==
Chart (1977)	Peak position
US Hot Country Singles (Billboard)	12
