= Kitty Kallen =

American singer (1921–2016)

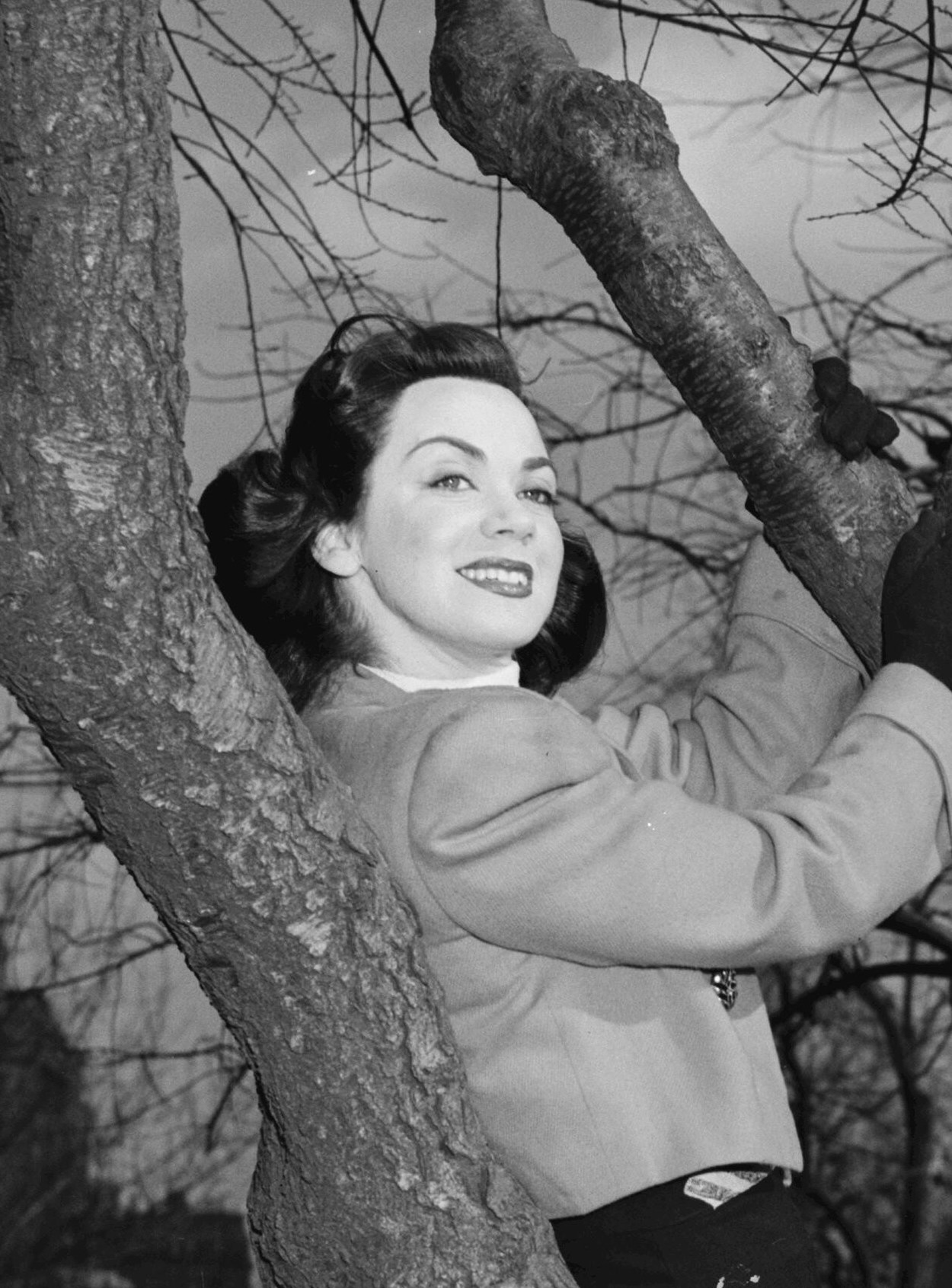
- Kallen in 1947
- Born: Katie Kallen; May 25, 1921; Philadelphia, Pennsylvania, U.S.
- Died: January 7, 2016 (aged 94); Cuernavaca, Mexico
- Spouses: Clint Garvin (annulled); Bernard Granoff (m. 1948; died 1996)
- Children: Jonathan Granoff
- Musical career
- Genres: Jazz; swing; pop
- Occupations: Singer; actor
- Instrument: Vocals
- Years active: 1930s–1965
- Labels: Columbia (1939–1948, 1956–1959); Decca (1940, 1953–1955); Mercury (1949–1951); RCA Victor (1963); 20th Century Fox (1964)

Katie "Kitty" Kallen (May 25, 1921 – January 7, 2016) was an American singer whose career spanned from the 1930s to the 1960s, including the Swing era of the Big Band years, the post-World War II pop scene, and the early years of rock 'n roll. Kallen performed with popular big band leaders of the 1940s, including Jimmy Dorsey and Harry James, before establishing a solo career.

She is best known for her 1954 solo recording '"Little Things Mean a Lot", a song that stayed at the U.S. Billboard number one spot for nine consecutive weeks and took top honor as 1954's #1 song of the year, charted in the U.S. for almost seven months, hit No. 1 on the UK singles chart, and sold more than two million copies. Voted "most popular female singer" in 1954 in both Billboard and Variety polls, Kallen lost her voice at the London Palladium in 1955 at the top of her career and stopped singing before an audience for four years. After testing her voice under a pseudonym in small town venues, she ultimately returned and went on to achieve 13 top-ten career hits.

== Early life ==
Born Katie Kallen (her birth name at times erroneously reported as Katherine Kalinsky) on May 25, 1921, in Philadelphia, Pennsylvania, to Russian Jewish immigrants Samuel and Fannie Kalinsky (née Kaplan) (later Kallen), she was one of seven children. As a child, she won an amateur contest by imitating popular singers. When she returned home with her prize, a camera, her father did not believe her, and punished her for stealing the camera. Only when neighbors subsequently visited to congratulate her did Kallen's father realize she had actually won it.

== Career ==
As a young girl, she sang on The Children's Hour, a radio program sponsored by Horn & Hardart, the automat chain. As a preteen, Kallen had a radio program on Philadelphia's WCAU and sang with the big bands of Jan Savitt in 1936, Artie Shaw in 1938, and Jack Teagarden in 1939. It was with Teagarden's band that Kallen cut her first records, eight sides in total.

Shortly before her 21st birthday, on May 5, 1942, she sang the vocals for "Moonlight Becomes You", with Bobby Sherwood and His Orchestra at the second ever session for what was then still called Liberty Records but would soon be renamed Capitol Records. It was her only session for the label.

At 21, she joined the Jimmy Dorsey band, replacing Helen O'Connell. One of her recordings with Dorsey was a favorite of American servicemen: "They're Either Too Young or Too Old" reached the No. 2 position in the Billboard charts in 1944. The same year, Kallen performed the vocals for Dorsey's number-one hit "Besame Mucho". Most of her singing assignments were in duets with Bob Eberly, and when Eberly left to go into the service toward the end of 1943, she joined Harry James's band.

Between January and November 1945, she had two songs recorded with the Harry James Orchestra in the top twenty, six in the top ten, and two at the No. 1 spot: "I'm Beginning to See the Light" and "It's Been a Long, Long Time", which remains deeply associated with the end of World War II and the returning troops. In 1951, Kallen appeared with Buster Crabbe as the Queen and King of Winter at the Lake Placid resort.

As a solo performer following the war, Kallen bounced from label to label—a brief stint with Musicraft in 1946 and then three years at Mercury in 1949-51, followed by a stint at Columbia and a reunion with Harry James. Despite covering a number of songs that had been hits for other singers, she still failed to produce a major hit. It was not until signing with Decca in 1953 that she at last enjoyed chart success.

With the 1954 hit "Little Things Mean a Lot", she was voted the most popular female singer in Billboard and Variety polls. AllMusic called the recording a "monster hit", and music historian Jonny Whiteside said the song "ably characterizes Kallen's impressive, and graceful, transition from classic big band swing to modern post-war pop". She followed up the song with "In the Chapel in the Moonlight", another million selling record, in the U.S. and a version of "True Love" for Decca.

Kallen performed at numerous prominent live venues including Manhattan's Copacabana, Morris Levy's Versailles, the Capitol Theater, the Maisonette Room at the St. Regis, the Cafe Rouge at the Hotel Pennsylvania and the Plaza Hotel's Persian Room. As well as this, she starred on Broadway in Finian's Rainbow; in the 1955 film The Second Greatest Sex and on numerous television shows including The Tonight Show with Johnny Carson, The Big Beat with singer-host Richard Hayes, American Bandstand, and Fred Allen's Judge for Yourself.

In 1956, rock-and-roll was dominating the charts and nosing out most older singers. Kallen experienced a mental breakdown during this time in which she found herself unable to sing live, although she could perform in the studio with no problems. She sought help from a psychiatrist but ended the sessions after he asked her to undress as part of therapy. Kallen's psychological issues and the changing music landscape convinced her to retire from performing, but three years later she decided to make a comeback and signed with Columbia.

In 1959, she recorded "If I Give My Heart to You" for Columbia and in 1963, she recorded a top-selling version of "My Coloring Book" for RCA Victor. Her final album was Quiet Nights, a bossa nova–flavored release for 20th Century Fox Records after which she retired from recording permanently.

During the height of her popularity, three imposters billed themselves as Kitty Kallen. When one of them, Genevieve Agostinello, died in 1978, it was incorrectly reported that Kallen herself had died. On February 8, 1960, Kallen received a star on the Hollywood Walk of Fame (located on the north side of Hollywood Boulevard at #7021).

A compilation of her hits on various labels remains available on the Sony CD set The Kitty Kallen Story.

== Marriages ==
While performing with Jack Teagarden's band, she married Clint Garvin, the band's clarinet player. When Teagarden fired Garvin, Kallen left as well, later annulling the marriage. In 1948, Kallen married Bernard "Budd" Granoff, a publicist, agent, and television producer — who later became a pioneering television syndicator. The couple, married for over forty-five years until Granoff's death in 1996, had a son, Jonathan Granoff, President of the Global Security Institute and Adjunct Professor of International Law at Widener University School of Law.

== Later years ==
In 1977, Kallen sued her dermatologist, Norman Orentreich, after he prescribed an estrogen drug, Premarin, for her small facial wrinkles. She subsequently suffered blood clots in her lungs, caused directly by the drug, and was awarded $300,000 by a court.

In 2008, Kallen joined artists Patti Page, Tony Martin, Dick Hyman, Richard Hayman and the estates of Count Basie, Benny Goodman, Sarah Vaughan, Woody Herman, Les Brown, the Mills Brothers, Jerry Murad, Frankie Laine, and the gospel singer Sister Rosetta Tharpe in a suit against the world's then largest music label, Universal Music Group, alleging the company had cheated them on royalties.

In 2009, Kallen was inducted into the Hit Parade Hall of Fame.

Kallen had homes in Englewood, New Jersey, and Cuernavaca, Mexico. By the end of her life, she lived full-time in Cuernavaca, where she died on January 7, 2016, at the age of 94. She was in a relationship with Sonny Shiell in her later years.

== Albums discography ==
- 1956 It's A Lonesome Old Town
- 1960 If I Give My Heart To You
- 1961 Honky Tonk Angel, Country Songs With A City Flavor
- 1963 Kitty Kallen Sings Our Lady of Fatima
- 1963 Kitty Kallen's "My Coloring Book" And Her Other Great Hits
- 1964 Quiet Nights

== Singles discography ==
| Year | Single (A-side, B-side) Both sides from same album except where indicated Unrelated B-sides not shown | Chart positions | | | | | | Album |
| Year | Single (A-side, B-side) Both sides from same album except where indicated Unrelated B-sides not shown | ^{U.S.} | ^{U.S. R&B} | ^{U.S. AC} | ^{UK} | ^{Cash Box} | ^{Music Vendor/Record World} | Album |
|---|---|---|---|---|---|---|---|---|
| 1943 | "They're Either Too Young or Too Old" (with Jimmy Dorsey) / | 2 | | | | | | Non-album tracks |
| 1943 | "Star Eyes" (with Jimmy Dorsey & Bob Eberly) | 3 | | | | | | Non-album tracks |
| 1944 | "Bésame Mucho (with Jimmy Dorsey & Bob Eberly) | 1 | | | | | | Non-album tracks |
| 1944 | "When They Ask About You" (with Jimmy Dorsey and Barbara Witsen | 4 | 10 | | | | | Non-album tracks |
| 1945 | "I'm Beginning to See the Light"(with Harry James) | 1 | | | | | | Non-album tracks |
| 1945 | "I Don't Care Who Knows It" (with Harry James) / | 8 | | | | | | Non-album tracks |
| 1945 | "I Guess I'll Hang My Tears Out to Dry" (with Harry James) | 16 | | | | | | Non-album tracks |
| 1945 | "Yah-Ta-Ta, Yah-Ta-Ta" (with Harry James) | 11 | | | | | | Non-album tracks |
| 1945 | "11:60 PM" (with Harry James) | 8 | | | | | | Non-album tracks |
| 1945 | "I'll Buy That Dream" (with Harry James) | 2 | | | | | | Non-album tracks |
| 1945 | "It's Been a Long, Long Time" (with Harry James) | 1 | | | | | | Non-album tracks |
| 1945 | "Waitin' for the Train To Come In" (with Harry James) | 6 | | | | | | Non-album tracks |
| 1946 | "My Heart Belongs to Daddy" (with Artie Shaw) | 22 | | | | | | Non-album tracks |
| 1949 | "Silver Bells" b/w "A Bushel and a Peck"; Both sides with Richard Hayes | | | | | | | Kitty Kallen Sings |
| 1949 | "Kiss Me Sweet" b/w "I Don't See Me in Your Eyes Anymore" (from Kitty Kallen Sings) | 30 | | | | | | Non-album tracks |
| 1949 | "I'm Gonna Wash That Man Right Outa My Hair" b/w "Happy Talk" | | | | | | | Non-album tracks |
| 1949 | "Milwaukee" b/w "Fellow in Yellowstone Park" | | | | | | | Non-album tracks |
| 1949 | "Mad About the Boy" b/w "A Man Wrote a Song" | | | | | | | Non-album tracks |
| 1950 | "I Got Tookin'" b/w "If You Smile at the Sun" | | | | | | | Non-album tracks |
| 1950 | "Juke Box Annie" b/w "Choo'n Gum" | 17 | | | | | | Non-album tracks |
| 1950 | "You Missed the Boat" b/w "Monday, Tuesday, Wednesday"; Both sides with Jimmy Carrol Orchestra | | | | | | | Non-album tracks |
| 1950 | "Mother, Pin a Rose on Me" b/w "Willya, Won'tcha (Kinda Sorta)"; Both sides with Mitch Miller | | | | | | | Non-album tracks |
| 1950 | "Our Lady of Fatima" b/w "Honestly, I Love You"; Both sides with Richard Hayes | 10 | | | | | | Kitty Kallen Sings |
| 1950 | "Get Out Those Old Records" b/w "It Is No Secret"; Both sides with Richard Hayes | | | | | | | Kitty Kallen Sings |
| 1951 | "Aba Daba Honeymoon" b/w "I Don't Want to Love You" (Non-album track); Both sides with Richard Hayes | 9 | | | | | | Kitty Kallen Sings |
| 1951 | "Last Night My Heart Crossed the Ocean" b/w "If You Want Some Lovin'" | | | | | | | Non-album tracks |
| 1951 | "Old Soft Shoe" b/w "I Wish I Had a Daddy in the White House" | | | | | 30 | | Kitty Kallen Sings |
| 1951 | "Another Human Being of the Opposite Sex" b/w "More! More! More!" | | | | | | | Non-album tracks |
| 1952 | "When I Dream (I Always Dream of You)" b/w "To Be Loved by You"; Both sides with Harry James | | | | | | | Non-album tracks |
| 1953 | "Lonely" b/w "Heartless Love" | | | | | | | Non-album tracks |
| 1953 | "Are You Looking for a Sweetheart?" b/w "A Little Lie" (Non-album track) | 27 | | | | 38 | | Little Things Mean a Lot |
| 1954 | "Little Things Mean a Lot" b/w "I Don't Think You Love Me Anymore" (Non-album track) | 1 | | | 1 | 1 | 12 | Little Things Mean a Lot |
| 1954 | "In the Chapel in the Moonlight" / | 4 | | | | 5 | 7 | Little Things Mean a Lot |
| 1954 | "Take Everything but You" | | | | | 44 | 24 | Non-album track |
| 1954 | "I Want You All to Myself (Just You)" / | 23 | | | | 24 | 22 | Little Things Mean a Lot |
| 1954 | "Don't Let The Kiddy Geddin" | | | | | 31 | 26 | Non-album tracks |
| 1954 | "Baby Brother (Santa Claus, Dear Santa Claus)" b/w "The Spirit Of Christmas" | | | | | | | Non-album tracks |
| 1955 | "I'd Never Forgive Myself" / | | | | | | 32 | Non-album tracks |
| 1955 | "Honestly" | | | | | 31 | 38 | Non-album tracks |
| 1955 | "Kitty Who?" b/w "By Bayou Bay" | | | | | | 83 | Non-album tracks |
| 1955 | "Forgive Me" b/w "If It's a Dream" | | | | | | 41 | Non-album tracks |
| 1955 | "Just Between Friends" b/w "Let's Make the Most of Tonight" (Non-album track) | | | | | | 75 | It's a Lonesome Old Town |
| 1955 | "Come Spring" b/w "Only Forever" (from Little Things Mean a Lot) | | | | | | | Non-album tracks |
| 1955 | "Sweet Kentucky Rose" / | 76 | | | | 30 | 23 | Non-album tracks |
| 1955 | "How Lonely Can I Get?" | | | | | | 33 | Little Things Mean a Lot |
| 1956 | "Go on with the Wedding" b/w "The Second Greatest Sex"; Both sides with Georgie Shaw | 39 | | | | 16 | 54 | Non-album tracks |
| 1956 | "Will I Always Be Your Sweetheart?" b/w "True Love" (from Little Things Mean a Lot) | | | | | | 74 | Non-album tracks |
| 1956 | "How About Me?" b/w "The Lonely One" | | | | | | 72 | It's a Lonesome Old Town |
| 1956 | "Ah, Ah, Ah, Ah" b/w "Saturday Blues" (Non-album track) | | | | | | | Little Things Mean a Lot |
| 1957 | "Star Bright (Mara)" b/w "Gently, Johnny" | | | | | | | Non-album tracks |
| 1957 | "Hideaway Heart" b/w "Teen-Age Heart" | | | | | | | Non-album tracks |
| 1957 | "Lasting Love" b/w "Long, Lonely Nights" | | | | | | 39 | Non-album tracks |
| 1957 | "Crying Roses" b/w "I Never Was the One" | | | | | | 82 | Non-album tracks |
| 1958 | "Love Is a Sacred Thing" b/w "When Will I Know" (Non-album track) | | | | | | 82 | If I Give My Heart to You |
| 1959 | "If I Give My Heart to You" b/w "The Door That Won't Open" (Non-album track) | 34 | | | | 25 | 27 | If I Give My Heart to You |
| 1960 | "That Old Feeling" / | 55 | | | | 100 | 87 | If I Give My Heart to You |
| 1960 | "Need Me" | | | | | | 91 | Non-album track |
| 1960 | "Got a Date with an Angel" b/w "Always in My Heart" | | | | | | 111 | If I Give My Heart To You |
| 1960 | "Make Love to Me" b/w "Heaven Help Me" | | | | | | | Non-album tracks |
| 1960 | "Be True to Me" b/w "Come Live with Me" | | | | | | | Non-album tracks |
| 1960 | "The Things You Left in My Heart" b/w "I Believe in You" | | | | | | | Non-album tracks |
| 1961 | "Hey, Good Lookin'" b/w "Raining in My Heart" | | | | | | 117 | Honky Tonk Angel |
| 1961 | "Summertime Lies" b/w "Yassu" | | | | | 118 | | Non-album tracks |
| 1962 | "It Wasn't God Who Made Honky Tonk Angels" b/w "You Are My Sunshine" | 101 | | | | 137 | | Honky Tonk Angel |
| 1962 | "My Coloring Book" b/w "Here's To Us" (Non-album track) | 18 | | 7 | | 13 | 8 | My Coloring Book |
| 1963 | "Please Don't" b/w "Star Eyes" (from My Coloring Book) | 121 | | | | | | Non-album tracks |
| 1963 | "I'll Teach You How to Cry" b/w "We'll Cross That Bridge" | | | | | | 99 | Non-album tracks |
| 1964 | "Make Someone Love You" b/w "Lies and More Lies" | | | | | | | Non-album tracks |
| 1965 | "It's Almost Tomorrow" b/w "All I Do Is Dream of You" | | | | | | | Non-album tracks |
| 1965 | "No One Will Ever Know" b/w "So Many Others" | | | | | | | Non-album tracks |
| 1966 | "One Grain of Sand" b/w "From Your Lips to the Ears of an Angel" | | | | | | | Non-album tracks |
| 1967 | "Oba, Oba" b/w "Summer, Summer Wind" | | | | | | | Non-album tracks |
