= Take My Breath Away (Margo Smith song) =

Single by Margo Smith

from the album Happiness
- B-side: "When, Where and Why"
- Released: September 1976
- Recorded: March 1976; Nashville, Tennessee, U.S.
- Genre: Country
- Length: 2:49
- Label: Warner Bros.
- Songwriters: Margo Smith; Norro Wilson
- Producer: Norro Wilson

Margo Smith singles chronology
"Save Your Kisses for Me" (1976)	"Take My Breath Away" (1976)	"Love's Explosion" (1977)

"Take My Breath Away" is a song co-written and recorded by American country artist Margo Smith. The song was released as a single in 1976 and became her third top-ten hit single.

"Take My Breath Away" was recorded in March 1976 at the Columbia Studio, located in Nashville, Tennessee, United States. It was Smith's fourth studio session after being signed with Warner Bros. Records the same year. The session was produced by Norro Wilson, who was also the song's co-writer. The session was cut earlier in the year with the intention it would become Smith's next single release.

"Take My Breath Away" was released as a single in November 1976 via Warner Bros. Records. The song became Margo Smith's third top-ten single on the Billboard Hot Country Singles chart, reaching a peak of seven. "Take My Breath Away" was later released on Smith's third studio album Happiness. It would be the album's most successful single, as its other releases reached progressively lower positions on the Billboard chart.

== Chart performance ==
Chart (1976–1977)	Peak position
US Hot Country Singles (Billboard)	7
