= Still a Woman =

Single by Margo Smith

from the album A Woman
- B-side: "Tennessee Sandman"
- Released: January 1979
- Recorded: December 1978; Columbia Recording Studio; Nashville, Tennessee, U.S.
- Genre: Country
- Length: 3:27
- Label: Warner Bros.
- Songwriters: Mack David; Margo Smith; Norris D. Wilson
- Producer: Norro Wilson

Margo Smith singles chronology
| "Little Things Mean a Lot" (1978) | "Still a Woman" (1979) | "If I Give My Heart to You" (1979) |

"Still a Woman" is a song co-written and released as a single by American country artist Margo Smith. It was one of several top ten country hits Smith would enjoy during the late 1970s. The song was the first single released from her 1979 album entitled A Woman. "Still a Woman" signified Smith's transition towards a sexually charged persona. It has also been considered one of country music's first songs to characterize the point of view of a middle-aged woman.

== Content and reception ==
"Still a Woman" was co-written by Margo Smith, and also with Mack David and Norro Wilson. The latter was a frequent collaborator with Smith, who also helped pen her earlier singles such as "Take My Breath Away", "Love's Explosion", and "My Weakness". The song's plot describes a married woman who compares herself with a younger woman who has caught her husband's attention. "Still a Woman" was recorded at the Columbia Recording Studio in December 1978, located in Nashville, Tennessee, United States. The session was produced by Norro Wilson, who had been serving as Smith's producer since 1976.

"Still a Woman" has received mixed critical reception since its initial release. Greg Adams of Allmusic compared the song to Lou Reed's 1972 single "Walk on the Wild Side", stating that the "bass riff" was "oddly borrowed" from Reed's song. Kurt Wolff of Country Music: The Rough Guide called Smith's composition "lyrical boldness". Wolff continued to say, "Few singers spoke so unabashedly of attempting to reinvigorate love's fading fires, especially from a woman's perspective." Robert K. Oermann and A. Mary Bufwakck of Finding Her Voice: The History of Women in Country Music said the song represented, "a theme song" for middle-aged women during the late 1970s and early 1980s. They also compared Smith's musical representation to similar artists from the time period, including Dottie West.

== Chart performance and release ==
"Still a Woman" was released a single in January 1979 via Warner Bros. Records. The B-side to the single was "Tennessee Sandman". It reached the top ten of the Billboard Hot Country Singles chart in 1979, peaking at number seven. Additionally, the song reached number seventeen on the Canadian RPM Country Songs survey around the same time. "Still a Woman" became her seventh single to reach the Billboard top ten and also become one of her final singles to do so. The single was later issued that year onto Smith's fifth studio album A Woman.

"Still A Woman" represented a career shift for Smith following its success. She identified with a "sexier new image" according to Oermann and Bufwack of Finding Her Voice: The History of Women in Country Music. Smith re-created her stage show with spandex clothing, satin costumes, and choreography. Her fan club also increased and she recording duets with a younger Rex Allen, Jr. She spoke openly of sexuality in interviews, stating in 1980, "Sex is a part of every woman., And if she says it ain't, she's a liar. That's the way I feel." In 1983, Smith would revert to her former image as a traditionally oriented country performer. She would later call her 1979 career shift a "mistake".

According to Bufwack and Oermann, "Still a Woman" is to date country music's "biggest all-time hit asserting the dignity and sexuality of the middle-aged woman."

== Track listings ==
7" single

- "Still a Woman" – 3:27
- "Tennessee Sandman" – 2:54

== Credits and personnel ==
- Mack David – writer
- Margo Smith – writer
- Norris D. Wilson – producer, writer

== Charts ==
| Chart (1979) | Peak position |
|---|---|
| Canada Country Songs (RPM) | 17 |
| US Hot Country Singles (Billboard) | 7 |
