= If I Give My Heart to You =

1954 popular song

"If I Give My Heart to You" is a popular song written by Jimmy Brewster (Milt Gabler), Jimmie Crane, and Al Jacobs. The most popular versions of the song were recorded by Doris Day and by Denise Lor; both charted in 1954.

== Main versions ==
The recording by Doris Day was first released by Columbia Records in 1954 as a single (catalog number 40300). It first reached the Billboard magazine charts on September 11, 1954. On the Disk Jockey chart, it peaked at No. 4; on the Best Seller chart, at No. 4; on the Juke Box chart, at No. 3. It was later included on the 1958 compilation album Doris Day's Greatest Hits.

The recording by Denise Lor was released by Majar Records as catalog number 27. It first reached the Billboard magazine Best Seller chart on August 25, 1954 and lasted 14 weeks on the chart, peaking at No. 13.

== Other versions ==
- Al Martino - a single release for Capitol Records (1973).
- Anne Shelton recorded a version for the UK market (1954).
- Bing Crosby recorded the song in 1954 for use on his radio show and it was subsequently included in the box set The Bing Crosby CBS Radio Recordings (1954-56) issued by Mosaic Records (catalog MD7-245) in 2009.
- Connee Boswell - a single release for Decca Records (1954).
- Dinah Shore recorded the song for RCA Victor. Her version was listed as a co-best-seller in Cashbox magazine.
- Duke Ellington and His Famous Orchestra - a single release for Capitol Records (1954).
- Ella Fitzgerald recorded this song in 1968 as part of a medley on her Columbia album, "30 by Ella".
- Joan Regan's recording became the highest charting version in the UK, reaching the No.3 position in 1954.
- Kitty Kallen also charted briefly in 1959 reaching the No. 34 spot.
- Margo Smith went to #10 on the Country charts with the song in 1979.
- Nat King Cole - also recorded a cover of this song for his 1954 EP Nat King Cole Sings: this EP peaked at #5 in the US.
- Solomon Burke included a version on his album Like a Fire (2008).
- Wright Brothers - this charted briefly at the #25 spot in 1954.
- Cliff Richard recorded the song for Columbia Records UK 1965 EP "Look In My Eyes Maria" SEG 8405
- Lea Salonga recorded the song for her second studio album, Lea (1988).

== Film appearances ==
- 1986 Crocodile Dundee, when the title character, played by Paul Hogan, sang the parody lyrics "if i give my heart to you, i'll have none and you'll have two".
- 1989 Gross Anatomy - the Doris Day version was used.
