= There I Said It =

Single by Margo Smith

from the album Margo Smith
- B-side: "Hurt Me Twice"
- Released: March 1975
- Recorded: January 1975
- Genre: Country
- Length: 2:03
- Label: 20th Century Fox
- Songwriter(s): Margo Smith
- Producer(s): Jim Vienneau

Margo Smith singles chronology
"I'm a Lady" (1971)	"There I Said It" (1975)	"Paper Lovin'" (1975)

"There I Said It" is a song written and recorded by American country artist Margo Smith. It was released as a single in 1975, becoming her first major hit as a musical artist.

The song was originally recorded for 20th Century Fox Records in January 1975 under Smith's first recording session for the label. Another song was recorded during this session entitled "Hurt Me Twice", which would later become the B-side to the single version of "There I Said It". The session was produced by Jim Vienneau.

"There I Said It" was released as Smith's first single for 20th Century Fox Records. It was issued in March 1975, two months after originally being recorded. The song also became her first major hit, peaking at number eight on the Billboard Magazine Hot Country Singles chart later that year. The song also peaked within the top-twenty on the Canadian RPM Country Songs chart in 1975. "There I Said It" set the release of Smith's self-titled debut studio album, also issued in 1975.

Although Smith would release two more singles for the 20th Century Fox label through 1975, she was cut from the company after its Nashville division closed. She was resigned to Warner Bros. Records in 1976 on the strength of her success with "There I Said It". It would start a series of major hits for Smith including, "Save Your Kisses for Me", "Don't Break the Heart That Loves You", and "Still a Woman".

== Chart performance ==
Chart (1975)	Peak position
Canada Country Songs (RPM)	14
US Hot Country Singles (Billboard)	8
