= Little Things Mean a Lot =

Single by Kitty Kallen
- B-side: "I Don't Think You Love Me Anymore"
- Released: March 8, 1954
- Recorded: December 30, 1953
- Studio: Decca, New York City
- Genre: Traditional pop
- Length: 2:57
- Label: Decca
- Songwriters: Edith Lindeman, Carl Stutz
- Producer: Jack Pleis

Kitty Kallen singles chronology
"Are You Looking for a Sweetheart?" (1953)	"Little Things Mean a Lot" (1954)	"In the Chapel in the Moonlight" (1954)

"Little Things Mean a Lot" is a popular song, with lyrics by Edith Lindeman and music by Carl Stutz, published in 1953. Lindeman was the leisure editor of the Richmond Times-Dispatch, and Stutz, a disc jockey from Richmond, Virginia. Stutz and Lindeman are also known for writing Perry Como's 1959 hit, "I Know" (which reached No.47 on the U.S. Billboard chart, No.32 in Canada, and No.13 on the UK Singles Chart).

The best known recording of "Little Things Mean a Lot," by Kitty Kallen (Decca 9-29037), reached No.1 on the Billboard chart in 1954, and also reached No.1 on the Cash Box chart the same year. Billboard ranked it as the No. 1 song of 1954. In addition, the track climbed to the top spot in the UK Singles Chart in September of that same year.

== Other charting versions ==
- Alma Cogan with orchestra conducted by Frank Cordell recorded it in London on May 22, 1954. Cogan's recording was released by EMI and reached No. 11 in the UK.
- Joni James reached No.35 in the USA and No.40 in Canada in 1960.
- Margo Smith, whose version reached No.3 C&W and also charted at No.37 on the Adult Contemporary chart in 1978. In Canada it reached No. 6 on the country charts.
