= It Only Hurts for a Little While =

Single by The Ames Brothers
- B-side: "If You Wanna See Mamie Tonight"
- Released: March 1956
- Recorded: 1956
- Genre: Traditional pop
- Length: 2:34
- Label: RCA Victor
- Songwriters: Fred Spielman, Mack David
- Producer: Hugo Winterhalter

The Ames Brothers singles chronology
"Forever Darling" (1956)	"It Only Hurts for a Little While" (1956)	"49 Shades Of Green" (1956)

"It Only Hurts for a Little While" is a 1956 popular song with music by Fred Spielman and lyrics by Mack David.

The recording by The Ames Brothers was released by RCA Victor Records as catalog number 20-6481. It first reached the Billboard magazine charts on May 19, 1956. On the Disk Jockey chart, it peaked at #15; on the Best Seller chart, at #16; on the Juke Box chart, at #11; on the composite chart of the top 100 songs, it reached #15.

== Cover versions ==
- In 1978, Country Music singer Margo Smith released her version of the song b/w Look Out Mountain, and it went to number one on the Country charts that year and was her second and last number one. It was released on her album Don't Break the Heart That Loves You that year.
- Anne Murray recorded a cover of the song for her album Croonin' (1993).
