= Don't Break the Heart That Loves You =

American song by Benny Davis and Ted Murry

"Don't Break the Heart That Loves You" is an American song written by Benny Davis and Murray Mencher (using the pseudonym Ted Murry). The song was a success for two artists in two different genres: Connie Francis in the pop field in 1962 and Margo Smith as a country version in 1978.

== Connie Francis version ==
"Don't Break the Heart That Loves You"

Single by Connie Francis
- B-side: "Drop It Joe"
- Released: January 1962
- Recorded: November 2, 1961
- Genre: Country; pop; easy listening
- Length: 2:58
- Label: MGM Records K 13059
- Songwriters: Benny Davis, Murray Mencher
- Producers: Danny Davis, Arnold Maxin

Connie Francis singles chronology
"When the Boy in Your Arms (Is the Boy in Your Heart)" (1961)	"Don't Break the Heart That Loves You" (1962)	"Second Hand Love" (1962)

=== Background ===
Benny Davis and Murray Mencher (1898–1991) became associated with Connie Francis by suggestion of Francis' father, George Franconero. The idea was to combine the skills of Tin Pan Alley veterans Davis and Mencher with the current sound of the day. Francis signed Mencher and Davis as regular composers to her own music publishing company, Francon Music Incorporated. Over the following years, Davis and Mencher wrote further hits for Francis, such as the country ballad The Biggest Sin of All and the theme song for Francis' third movie, Follow The Boys, which she also recorded in French, Italian, Spanish, Japanese, and German. Neither of the songs left a big impact on Billboard's Pop Charts, but became notable successes on the Adult Contemporary chart.

=== Overview ===
Francis recorded "Don't Break the Heart That Loves You" in a 2 November 1961 session which also produced "I'm Falling in Love With You Tonight," "When the Boy in Your Arms (Is the Boy in Your Heart)," "'Baby's First Christmas" (another Davis and Mencher composition), "'Mon Cœur est un Violon," and "Personne au Monde."

The ballad, recorded by Francis in two-part harmony with a spoken bridge, is a plea from a heartbroken lover who is trying to understand why her lover is going out of his way to treat her unkindly. The song ends with her begging him not to break her heart.

=== Charts ===
The Billboard Hot 100 dated 31 March 1962 ranked "Don't Break the Heart That Loves You" at No. 1, making her the first woman to have three No. 1 singles, it was also her final chart-topper. The Connie Francis recording also went to number one on the easy listening charts.

"Don't Break the Heart That Loves You" charted in the UK in April 1962 without paralleling its US chart impact; rather "Don't Break the Heart That Loves You" became Francis' first single to miss the UK Top 30 with peak position of No. 39. The track reached No.1 in New Zealand - where it would be Francis' last hit - and No. 18 in Australia.

=== Aftermath ===
Following the success in the US, Francis recorded "Don't Break the Heart That Loves You" subsequently also in German ("Tu mir Nicht Weh"), Spanish ("Mi Corazón te Adora"), Japanese (泣かせないでね) and in both regular Italian and the Italian dialect Neapolitan (both as "Un Desiderio Folle"). The Francis version is heard in the sixth episode ("Hagsploitation") of the FX television series Feud in the scene where Jessica Lange as Joan Crawford arrives in Baton Rouge to start filming Hush… Hush, Sweet Charlotte.

=== Chart performance ===
Chart (1962)	Peak position
Canada (CHUM Chart)	18
UK Singles (The Official Charts Company)	39
US Billboard Easy Listening	1
US Billboard Hot 100	1

== Other versions ==
"Don't Break the Heart That Loves You"

Single by Margo Smith

from the album Don't Break the Heart That Loves You
- B-side: "Apt. #4, Sixth Street in Cincinnati"
- Released: December 1977
- Recorded: 1977
- Genre: Country
- Length: 2:57
- Label: Warner Bros.
- Songwriters: Benny Davis, Ted Murry
- Producer: Norro Wilson

Margo Smith singles chronology
"So Close Again" (1977)	"Don't Break the Heart That Loves You" (1977)	"It Only Hurts for a Little While" (1978)

=== Margo Smith ===
In 1977, the ballad was recorded by country singer Margo Smith. Her version — featuring a saxophone solo during the musical bridge but not the recitation of Francis's version — topped the Billboard Hot Country Singles chart in February 1978, and crossed over to the Easy Listening chart peaking at number forty.

==== Chart performance ====
Chart (1977–1978)	Peak position
U.S. Billboard Hot Country Singles	1
U.S. Billboard Bubbling Under Hot 100	4
U.S. Billboard Adult Contemporary	40
Canadian RPM Country Tracks	5

=== Other recordings ===
"Don't Break the Heart That Loves You" has also been recorded by:

- Arthur Alexander (album You Better Move On/ 1962)
- The Lennon Sisters (album #1 Hits Of The 1960s/ 1964)
- Tatjana Hubinská ("Vieš, Čo Je Žiaľ" Slovak/ 1965) *Dominic Kirwan (album Unconditional Love/ 1999).
- Guy Lombardo recorded a version that appeared on his 1962, Decca album By Special Request.
