= Norro Wilson =

American singer-songwriter (1938–2017)

- Birth name: Norris Denton Wilson
- Born: April 4, 1938; Scottsville, Kentucky, U.S.
- Died: June 8, 2017 (aged 79); Nashville, Tennessee, U.S.
- Genres: Country
- Occupation(s): Singer-songwriter, record producer
- Instrument: Vocals
- Years active: 1969–2017
- Labels: Smash; Mercury; RCA; Capitol
- Website: norrowilson.com

Norris Denton "Norro" Wilson (April 4, 1938 – June 8, 2017) was an American country music singer-songwriter, producer, and member of the Nashville Songwriters Hall of Fame.

Wilson wrote or co-wrote numerous hit songs during more than 40 years in the industry, including songs for David Houston, Jean Shepard, Charlie Rich, Charley Pride, George Jones, and Tammy Wynette, among many others. He also produced or co-produced songs for dozens of artists, including early Reba McEntire, Joe Stampley, Margo Smith, Sara Evans, Kenny Chesney, and Shania Twain.

Earlier in his career, Wilson also charted ten singles on the Billboard magazine Hot Country Songs chart. The biggest of his three Top 40 hits was "Do It to Someone You Love" (written by Tom T. Hall) which reached No. 20 in 1970. He also recorded two songs, "Hey, Mister!" and "Mama McClusky", that were the basis for Charlie Rich's 1973 number one song, "The Most Beautiful Girl".

He died on June 8, 2017, in Nashville from heart failure.

== Discography ==
=== Albums ===
Year	Album	US Country	Label
1969	Dedicated To: Only You	40	Smash

=== Singles ===
Year	Single	Chart Positions		Album
Year	Single	US Country	CAN Country	Album
1969	"Only You"	68	—	Dedicated To: Only You
1969	"Love Comes but Once in a Lifetime"	44	—	Dedicated To: Only You
1969	"Shame on Me"	56	—	singles only
1970	"Do It to Someone You Love"	20	—	singles only
1970	"Old Enough to Want To (Fool Enough to Try)"	53	—	singles only
1972	"Everybody Needs Lovin'"	28	47	singles only
1973	"Darlin' Raise the Shade"	64	—	singles only
1973	"Ain't It Good (To Feel This Way)"	35	82	singles only
1974	"Loneliness (Can Break a Good Man Down)"	96	—	singles only
1977	"So Close Again" (w/ Margo Smith)	43	—	Happiness (Margo Smith album)

== Awards and recognition ==
- 1975 Grammy Award (with Billy Sherrill, songwriters) for Best Country Song, "A Very Special Love Song"
- 1996 Inductee into the Nashville Songwriters Hall of Fame
- 2008 Inducted into Kentucky Music Hall of Fame
- 2018 Academy of Country Music Poet's Award
