= Buttedahl =

Buttedahl is a Norwegian surname. Notable people with this surname include:

- Johan Buttedahl (born 1935), Norwegian dentist and politician
- Knute Buttedahl (1925–2000), Canadian academic
- Paz Buttedahl (1942–2007), Canadian academic
- Sæbjørn Buttedahl (1876–1960), Norwegian actor and sculptor
