= Garry Jacobs =

American writer and researcher

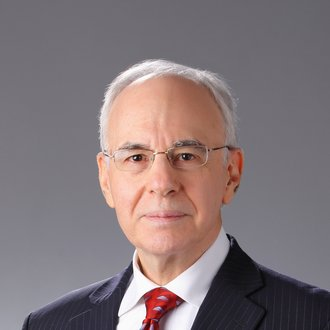
- Born: July 29, 1946 (age 80)
- Education: University of California, Berkeley
- Writing career
- Subject: Business

Garry Jacobs (born 29 July 1946) is an American writer, social thinker, researcher and consultant on the topics of business management, economic and social development, and global governance. He is the president and CEO of the World Academy of Art & Science; chairman of the board and CEO of the World University Consortium; Managing Editor of Cadmus Journal; Director of Research of The Mother’s Service Society; Distinguished Professor of Interdisciplinary Studies at the Person-Centered Approach Institute, Italy; executive director of the International Center for Peace and Development in Napa, California; a full member of the Club of Rome; and Executive Chair, Human Security for All (HS4A), a global campaign established in 2023 in collaboration with UN Trust Fund for Human Security (UNTFHS).

== Career ==
In the early 1970s, Jacobs began to conduct research at The Mother’s Service Society on the theory and practice of individual, organizational and social development. Over the next decade, he wrote a number of papers on the principles of business management, economic and social development as aspects of an as yet undeveloped integrated science of society and is one aspect of an as yet undeveloped integrated science of society. Long before criticism of GDP became prevalent, he called for alternative measures of economic development and tested a new index applicable to rural areas of India. He also proposed a comprehensive set of strategies to accelerate Indian development and education. He headed a research team that developed strategies to accelerate national development for the Planning Commission (India) which were published in the book Kamadhenu: The Prosperity Movement. Jacobs also edited and contributed to the Indian Planning Commission's report India: Vision 2020.

In 1985, he co-authored the book The Vital Difference: Unleashing the Powers of Sustained Corporate Success with Frederick Harmon, a study of economic growth based on studies of multibillion-dollar companies. In 1990, he co-authored The Vital Corporation: How American Companies Large and Small Double Profits in Two Years or Less with Robert Macfarlane.

Jacobs' work as a business consultant has included assignments for medium and multinational corporations in USA, Europe and Asia on strategies to elevate corporate values, accelerate growth, and improve profitability.

In 1989, Jacobs cofounded the International Commission on Peace & Food, and served for five years as its Member-Secretary, convener of ICPF’s working groups on Employment, coordinator of the ICPF research team that evolved a strategy to generate 100 million new jobs in India, which was adopted as official policy by the Government of India in 1992. Jacobs was the lead author as well as editor of the commission’s report to the United Nations entitled Uncommon Opportunities: Agenda for Peace & Equitable Development. He also co-chaired ICPF task forces that developed strategies for generating global full employment and for economic transition in Eastern Europe. He acted as the organization's member secretary until 1994.

In 1995, he was elected to the World Academy of Art & Science and joined the Board of Trustees as Chair of the Committee on Peace & Development in 2005. He was elected as the president of the academy in November 2019.

In 2009, he was appointed Coordinator of the World Academy’s project on Global Employment Challenge, and authored a number of studies about employment opportunities in developing and industrialized nations.

Jacobs led the WAAS initiative that led to the founding of the World University Consortium in 2014 by WAAS and partner organizations to develop a new paradigm for transdisciplinary higher education and a global delivery system for affordable, accessible quality education. He has served as chair of the board and CEO from 2014 to present.

Over the past decade, Jacobs has led numerous initiatives of the academy including an international working group on new economic theory, development of the Human Economic Welfare Index (HEWI), an alternative to GDP which incorporates several socioeconomic indices, new paradigm for global governance, global leadership in the 21st century in collaboration with the United Nations Office at Geneva, and survey of Human Security for the UN Trust Fund on Human Security. He also led initiatives for development of PG level courses on mind, thinking and creativity; social power; transdisciplinary social science; individuality and values; global leadership; global governance; and future of democracy.

In collaboration with Ivo Šlaus, he developed the Human Economic Welfare Index (HEWI), an alternative to GDP which incorporates several socioeconomic indices.

Over the past decade, he has published more than 100 articles on economic theory, money and finance, business management, education, global governance, international law, international security, social development, mind and thinking, and personality.

Jacobs has presented and participated as a keynote speaker in many conferences all over the world.

== Other writings ==
Jacobs has written extensively on the application of principles derived from Sri Aurobindo's integral philosophy of consciousness, evolution to business management, social development and psychology, including a series of published lectures on Sri Aurobindo's Life Divine. He has also written a 900-page novel entitled The Book: the spiritual individual in quest of the living organization – Codec for the Infinite Game translating these principles into a story of four entrepreneurs in quest for success in business and individual fulfillment.

== Selected publications ==
- Garry Jacobs and Ketan Patel, "Sources and Solutions for Global Turbulence," Cadmus 5, no. 4 (2025): 1-32
- Garry Jacobs et al. "Origins and Pathways for the Future of the World Academy of Art & Science Strategic Perspectives and Opportunities," Cadmus 5, no. 3, p. 1 (2024): 1-40
- Ed. Garry Jacobs et al., Catalytic Strategies for Conscious Social Transformation: Leadership in Thought, Cambridge Scholars, 2023
- Garry Jacobs and Janani Ramanathan, "Paradigm Change to Human Security," Cadmus 5, no. 2 (2023): 20-26
- Janani Ramanathan and Garry Jacobs, "Education for Human Security Policy Brief," Cadmus 5, no. 2 (2023): 1-14
- Garry Jacobs, "Global Movement to Promote Human Security for All," Cadmus 5, no. 1 (2023): 1-6
- Garry Jacobs, "Missed Opportunities: Ukraine is an UN-finished Story of Global Proportions", Cadmus Special Issue: Report on War in Ukraine (2022): 23-37
- Garry Jacobs, "Process of Social Transformation", Cadmus 4, no. 5 (2021): 155-159
- Garry Jacobs et al., "A New Paradigm in Global Higher Education for Sustainable Development and Human Security," Cadmus 4, no. 5 (2021): 1-10
- Garry Jacobs, "Transdisciplinary Theory of the Firm," Cadmus 4, no. 4 (2021): 226-243
- Garry Jacobs and Donato Kiniger-Passigli, "Science as a Social Good," Cadmus 4, no. 4 (2021): 39-42
- Garry Jacobs et al., "Retrospective and Reflections on WAAS@60," Cadmus 4, no. 4 (2021): 1-31
- Garry Jacobs, Alexander Likhotal and Donato Kiniger Passigli, "Redefining Multilateralism," Cadmus 4, no.3 (2020): 5-19
- Garry Jacobs et al., "Catalytic Strategies for Socially Transformative Leadership: Leadership Principles, Strategies and Examples," Cadmus 4, no.2 (2020): 6-45
- Garry Jacobs, "Beyond the Nation-State: Failed Strategies and Future Possibilities for Global Governance and Human Wellbeing" Cadmus 4, no.1 (2019): 90-100
- Garry Jacobs and Janani Ramanathan, "The Significant Individual, Values and Social Evolution: How one man changed the world" Cadmus 3, no.5 (2018): 27-43
- Garry Jacobs, "Cryptocurrencies & the Challenge of Global Governance" Cadmus 3, no.4 (2018): 109-123
- Garry Jacobs, "The Political Economy of Neoliberalism and Illiberal Democracy" Cadmus 3, no,3 (2017): 122-141
- Garry Jacobs et al., "Quest for a New Paradigm in Economics - A Synthesis of Views of the New Economics Working Group" Cadmus 3, no.2 (2017): 10-44
- Garry Jacobs, "Integrated Approach to Peace & Human Security in the 21st Century," Cadmus 3, no.2 (2016): 48-71
- Garry Jacobs, "Money, Markets and Social Power" Cadmus 2, no.6 (2016): 20-42
- Garry Jacobs, "A Brief History of Mind and Civilization" Cadmus 2, no.6 (2016): 71-110
- Garry Jacobs, "The need for a new paradigm in economics" Review of Keynesian Economics, Edward Elgar Publishing, vol. 3(1), pages 2–8, January.
- Garry Jacobs, Winston Nagan and Alberto Zucconi, "Unification in the Social Sciences: Search for a Science of Society" Cadmus (2014): 1-22
- Garry Jacobs, "Ways of Knowing: Life Beyond Chaos" Eruditio 1, no.4 (2014): 9-30
- Garry Jacobs, "Steve Jobs: Nobel Laureate, " Cadmus 1, no.6 (2013): 91-102
- Garry Jacobs, "Limits to Rationality and the Boundaries of Perception," Eruditio 1, no.2 (2013): 108-118
- Garry Jacobs, "The World as Web" Eruditio 1, no.2 (2013): 26-35
- Garry Jacobs, "The Emerging Individual" 1, no. 1(2012): 9-22
- Garry Jacobs and Ivo Slaus, "Multiplying Money" 1, no.6 (2013): 123-141
- Ivo Slaus and Garry Jacobs, "Recognizing Unrecognized Genius" 1, no. 5(2012): 1-5
- Garry Jacobs and Ivo Slaus, "Immediate Solution for the Greek Financial Crisis" Cadmus 1, no.4(2012).
- Fred Harmon and Garry Jacobs, The Vital Difference - Unleashing the Powers of Sustained Corporate Success, New York: Amacom Publications, 1985
- Garry Jacobs and Robert Macfarlane, The Vital Corporation - How American Businesses Large and Small Double Profits in Two Years or Less, New York: Prentice Hall, 1987.
- Garry Jacobs, The Book, Amazon Digital Services, Inc., May 2010
- Harlan Cleveland and Garry Jacobs, Human Choice: The Genetic Code for Social Development, Futures Research Quarterly, Vol. 31, No. 9–10, November–December 1999, Pergamon, UK, p. 964
- Garry Jacobs and Ivo Šlaus, Human Capital & Sustainability, Sustainability 3, no. 1: 97-154
- Orio Giarini, Garry Jacobs, Bernard Lietaer and Ivo Šlaus, Introductory Paper for a Programme on The Wealth of Nations Revisited, Cadmus Volume 1, Issue 1, October 2010
- Garry Jacobs and Ivo Šlaus, Indicators of Economic Progress: The Power of Measurement and Human Welfare, Cadmus Volume 1, Issue 1, October 2010.
- Orio Giarini and Garry Jacobs, The Evolution of Wealth & Human Security: The Paradox of Value and Uncertainty, Cadmus Volume 1, Issue 3, October 2011.
- Garry Jacobs and Ivo Šlaus, From Limits to Growth to Limitless Growth, Cadmus Volume 1, Issue 4, April 2012.
- Garry Jacobs and Dr. G. Rangaswami, Prosperity 2000: Strategy to Generate 100 Million Jobs in India through Accelerated Development of Commercial Agriculture and Agro-based Industries, October 1991.
- Garry Jacobs and Ivo Šlaus, Global Prospects for Full Employment, Cadmus Volume 1, Issue 2, April 2011.
- Garry Jacobs, Lectures on Sri Aurobindo's The Life Divine, The Mother's Service Society, November 2005
