= Vancouver Institute for the Americas =

VIA Vancouver Institute for the Americas (1998–2007) was a Canadian higher education organization that operated under the umbrella of the Faculty of Education at the University of British Columbia Vancouver, dedicated to the research and project implementation of education for sustainable development centered on the academic integration of the Americas, under the guidance of the International Bureau of Education.
VIA operated from its main training center at 470 Granville Street, Vancouver, in the province of British Columbia, and from its southern regional training center in Las Condes, Santiago, Chile. VIA was an organization incorporated in British Columbia, with a subsidiary registered in Santiago. VIA was an institute registered at the Ministry of Advanced Education of British Columbia as a provider of private higher education, allowing it to provide accredited certifications and making its programs eligible for provincial financial assistance and Canadian government scholarship programs.

== Creation ==
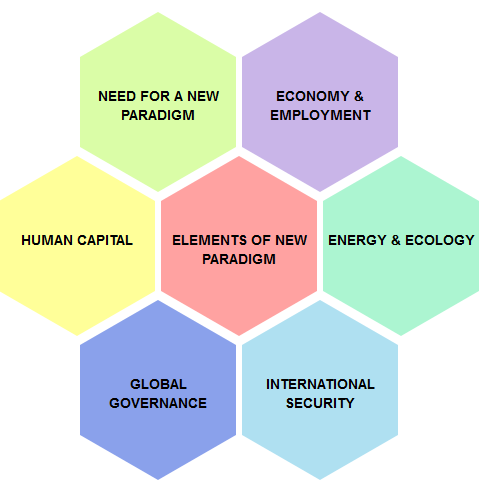
New Global Paradigm, 1998

In 1998, the University of British Columbia (UBC) professor Paz Buttedahl launched an academic organization dedicated to the vocational and professional development of educators across the Americas. Paz's aim was centered in Education for Sustainable Development, giving the vision for the creation of VIA Vancouver Institute for the Americas. The main office was initially located at the Faculty of Education on the University of British Columbia's main campus in Point Grey, Vancouver; while collaborating with the Vancouver Institute, Global Reporting Centre, that has brought the University of British Columbia and Vancouver community together through free public lectures since 1916.

The founding team was composed of faculty members and research students, until VIA's provincial incorporation and business licensing, then Paz Buttedahl selected a corporate team of field experts led by:

- Dra. Paz Buttedahl, President;
  Prof. Dr. Knute Buttedahl VP and Chief Financial Officer (CFO);
  Prof. Vito de Candia-Levieux,Director of Learning Systems;
  Prof. Lucía Carvajal Berland, Director for VIA Regional Center in Santiago, Chile;
  This team operated jointly with a multidisciplinary team of researchers, writers, faculty and university interns implementing multi-location projects across the Americas and extended to the Asia Pacific region.

== Projects ==
Since 1998, VIA's main contribution was the introduction of the digital process of academic programs. VIA's implementation of sustainable education projects were mainly funded by the Canadian International Development Agency (CIDA), impacting the fields of research and professional development for e-learning and the Global Education industry, working with UNESCO ASPNet initiatives.

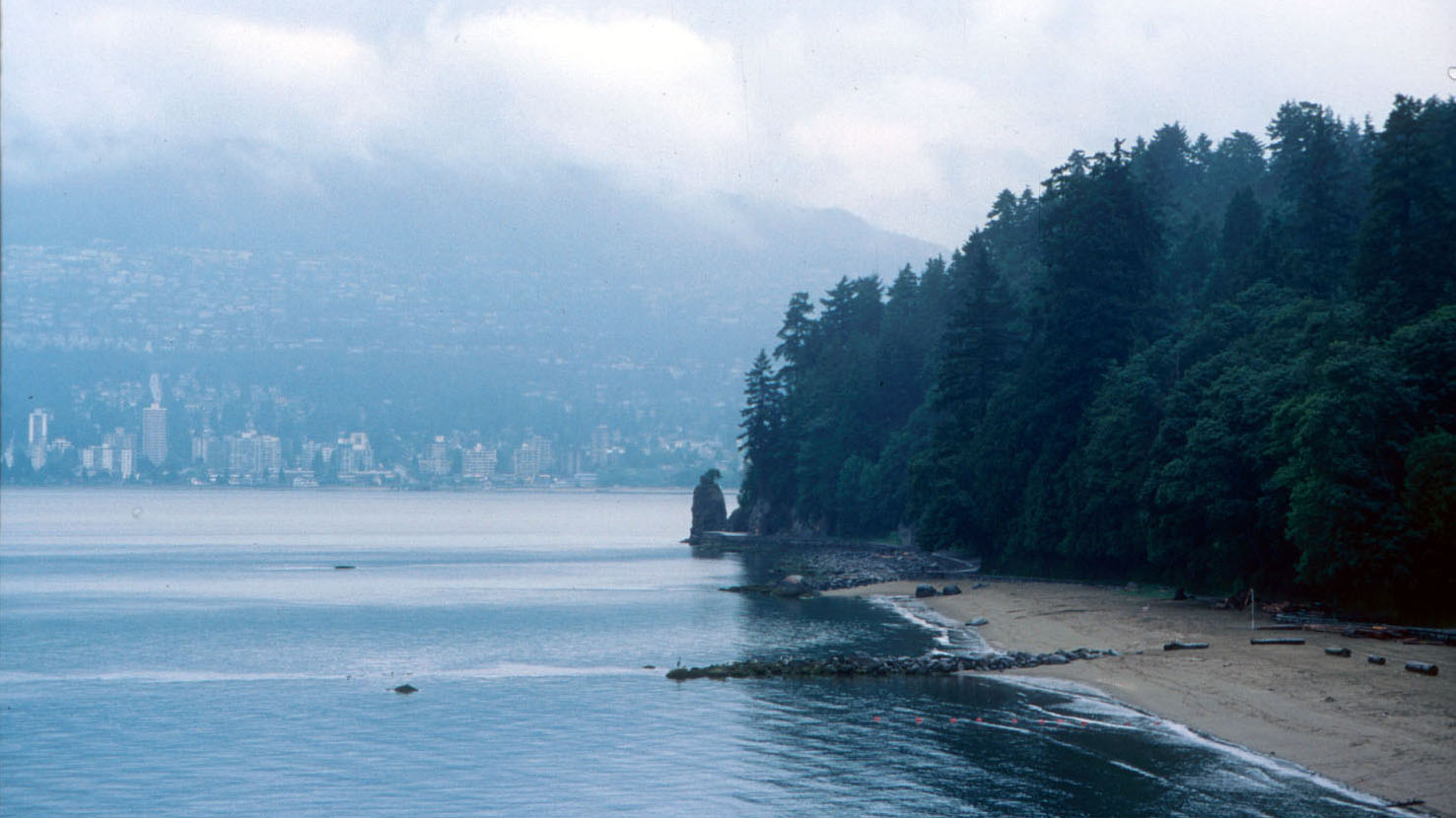
Stanley Park, Vancouver, BC

VIA's main research program was focused on human resources, with a focus on inclusion of multi-generational and gender equity in the workplace; these projects were affiliated and funded by University of British Columbia, UNESCO and the International Development Research Centre (IDRC).

The institute participated in peacebuilding initiatives and organized events for the World Academy of Art and Science, the Peacebuilding Commission, and the Vancouver Institute Lectures at the University of British Columbia.

== Publications ==
VIA's R&D team focused heavily on international development programs, multi-national educational reforms, and consulting workshops alongside agencies like UNESCO and CIDA, much of its output consisted of policy briefs, training frameworks, and project report papers rather than a traditional academic journal. In addition, VIA's R&D team participated in collective publications and academic teaching materials with professional centres at UBC, York University, Universidad Austral (Chile), Universidad Austral (Argentina), and Stanford University Regional Centres and Institutes mainly in the Andean regions of Chile and related projects in Argentina.

Key Notable Publications & Collaborative Papers:

- Open Regionalism: Strengthening the Net. Perspectives from APEC Countries (1999). Details: Co-edited by Paz Buttedahl and Francisco Rojas Aravena, this prominent book/report was published jointly by FLACSO Chile and the Vancouver Institute for the Americas. It centers on economic and educational integration across countries in the Asia-Pacific Economic Cooperation (APEC).
- Educational Reform and E-Learning Platform Research. Details: VIA was heavily involved in the development and documentation of multinational educational initiatives, notably the ENLACES-Mineduc project in Chile. This research established e-learning platforms and educational networks under the guidance of the International Bureau of Education.
- Human Security and Educational Frameworks. Details: The institute regularly contributed regional studies and workshop papers to UNESCO networks tracking human security, empowerment, and educational development in Latin America.

== Legacy ==
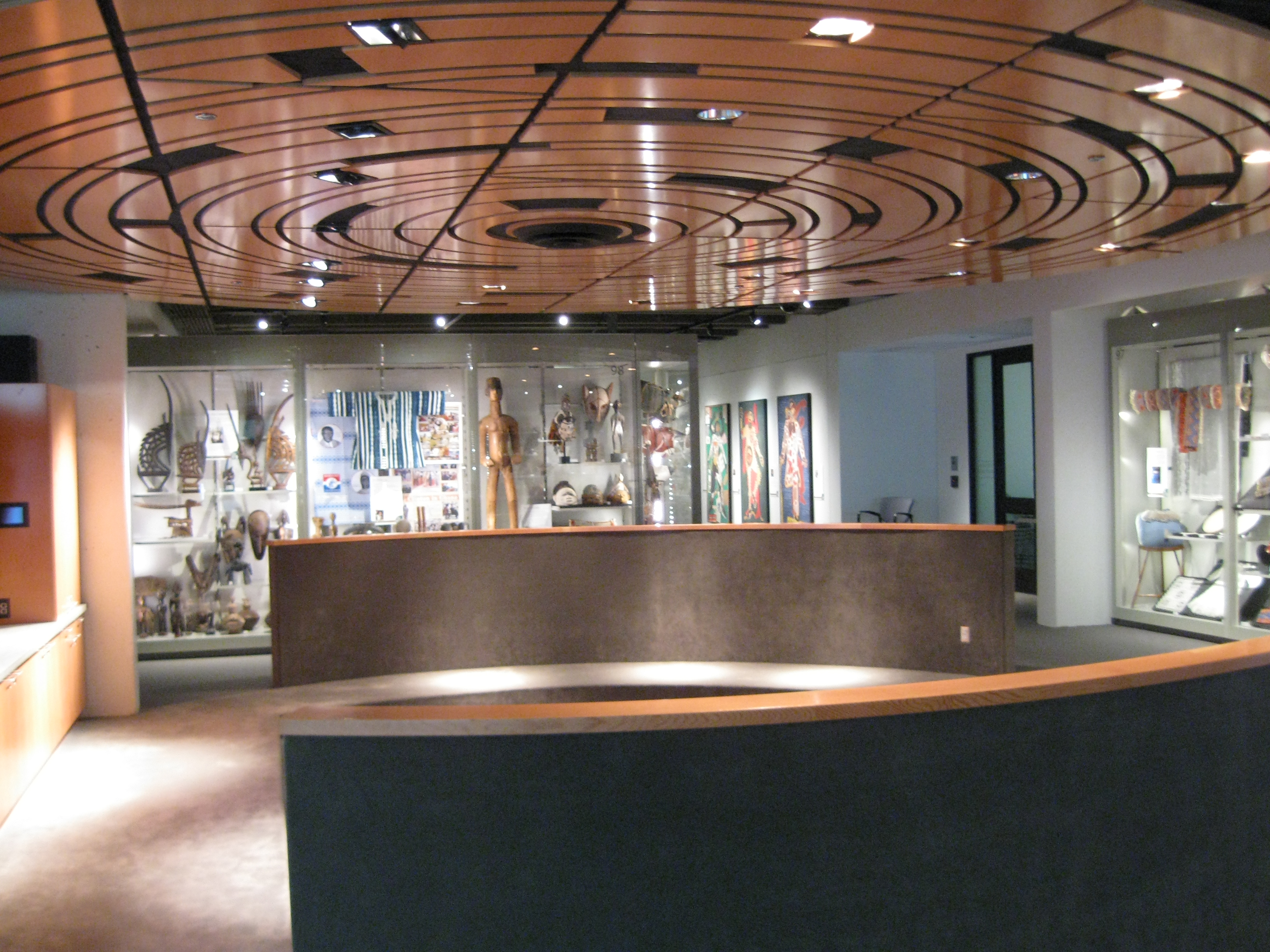
Multi-media Presentation Circle, UBC Museum of Anthropology

Among VIA's main initiatives are its program of academic mobility that spans the Americas, supporting accredited certificates, diplomas, bachelor's and master's degrees, in conjunction with its participation in the transformation process of its digital academic curriculum working with the Global e-learning project ENLACES-Mineduc, based in Chile; its affiliation to FLACSO University research projects, The World Academy of Art and Science (WAAS), UNESCO, and the United Nations University. VIA ceased operations following the death of its founder, Paz Buttedahl, in 2007.

== See also ==
- VIA University College, since 2008 in Denmark
