= ICPD =

ICPD may refer to:

- Institute of Continuing Professional Development
- International Conference on Population and Development
- Iowa City Police Department
- International Center for Peace and Development

== See also ==
- ICPDR
