= World Academy of Art and Science =

International scientific organization

World Academy of Art & Science
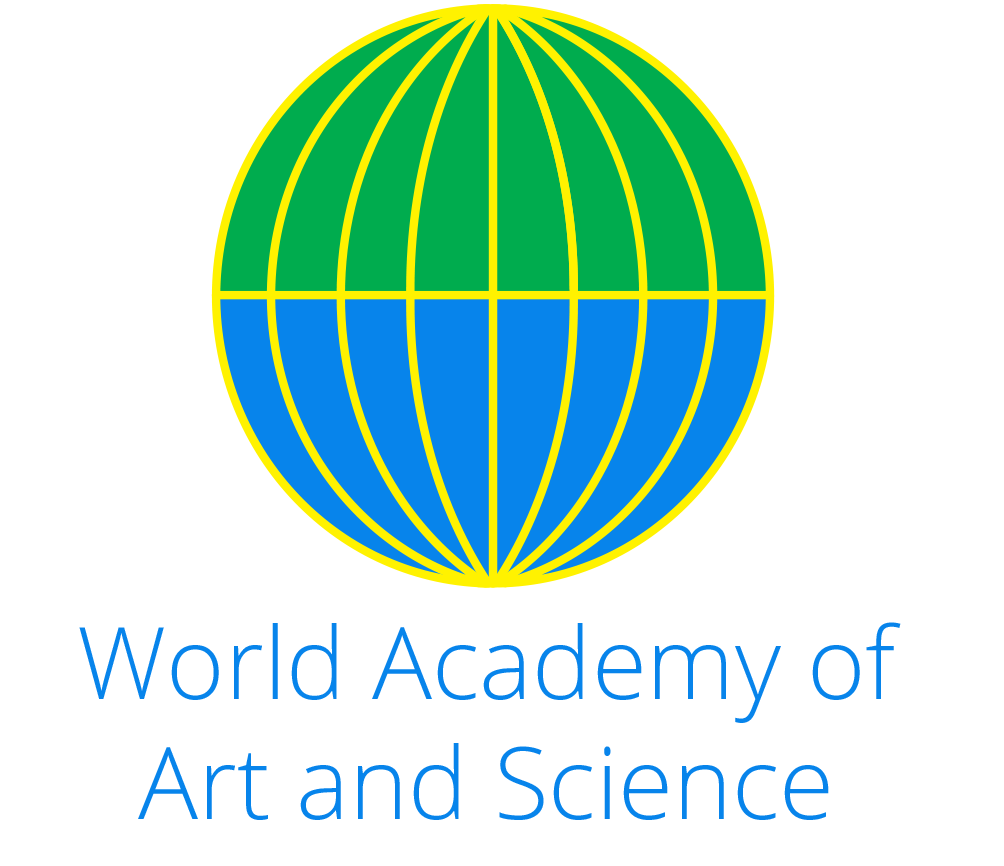
- Abbreviation: WAAS
- Formation: December 24, 1960; 65 years ago
- Type: Non-profit & NGO
- Purpose: Transnational, transdisciplinary approach to apply knowledge for global issues
- Location: Napa, California, U.S.; Bucharest, Romania; Pondicherry, India
- Region served: Worldwide
- Fields: Natural and social sciences, humanities, technology, business, governance, law and diplomacy
- Members: 750+ members
- President: Garry Jacobs
- Website: worldacademy.org

The World Academy of Art and Science (WAAS), founded in 1960, is an international non-governmental scientific organization and global network of more than 800 scientists, artists, and scholars in more than 90 countries.

It serves as a forum for scientists, artists, thinkers, political and social leaders to address global challenges from a transnational, transdisciplinary perspective independent of political boundaries and prevailing orthodoxies. Fellows are elected for their accomplishments in the sciences, arts and the humanities.

It has been granted special consultative status by the UN Economic and Social Council and consultative status by UNESCO. Originally established in Geneva, Switzerland in 1960, the academy was founded with the aim of creating an informal world association of the highest scientific and ethical norms and standards. In 2011 WAAS was incorporated as a 501(c)(3) public benefit charitable organization in the State of California. The Academy maintains offices in Napa, Bucharest, and Pondicherry, and has a special division for southeastern Europe.

== History ==
An early concept for the foundation of the academy, and a set of world scientific and youth scientist and science journalist associations, was proposed in an article in Time magazine on October 1, 1938, by philosopher Etienne Gilson in the 1940s, and echoed in the 1950s by scientists who were concerned about the potential for misuse of scientific discoveries.

In the immediate aftermath of World War II, numerous scientists and intellectuals, who had witnessed the potential of humankind to destroy itself, began to explore the idea of an international, non-governmental body that could address the major concerns of humanity. Conversations began between prominent individuals such as Albert Einstein, Robert Oppenheimer and Joseph Rotblat, who had each played a role in the creation of the atomic bomb and were disturbed about the potential misuse of these new, powerful scientific discoveries. Einstein, in a foreword (in German) to the book "Science and the Future of Mankind," by former WAAS President Hugo Boyko in 1964, expresses a wish that "The discovery of the atomic chain reaction needs to bring about as little annihilation as the invention of matches."

The origins of the association can be traced back to a letter drafted by Leo Szilard which Einstein sent to Franklin D. Roosevelt on August 2, 1939, warning him that recent research on fission chain reactions utilizing uranium made it probable that large amounts of power could be produced by a chain reaction and that, by harnessing this power, the construction of "extremely powerful bombs" was conceivable. He also suggested that Germany may already be working to develop such a weapon.

The letter resulted in the establishment of the Manhattan Project in 1942 under the leadership of Oppenheimer and to the development of the weapons that were dropped on Hiroshima and Nagasaki in 1945.

These events were followed by the development of the first Soviet atomic bomb in 1949 and the first Hydrogen bombs by the US in 1952 — a step soon followed by the USSR. Concern grew as the Cold War turned into a nuclear arms race. In 1955 Einstein and Bertrand Russell joined with nine other scientists — four of whom later went on to found The World Academy of Art and Science — to issue the Russell–Einstein Manifesto, warning of the dire threat of global nuclear destruction.

The informal discussions taking place between these distinguished scientists and intellectuals evolved into a more serious commitment — toward the responsible and ethical advances of science. The First International Conference on Science and Human Welfare was held in Washington DC., and organized by two American scientists with experience in this field: Richard Montgomery Field of Princeton University, former chairman of an international committee that focused on the social values of science, and John A. Fleming, former President of the International Council of Scientific Unions, today known as the International Council for Science, founded in 1931.

At the conclusion of the conference, it was agreed that a World Academy would be formed, and a committee was elected to begin the first steps towards its formation. The International Preparatory Committee consisted of (from France) Pierre Chouard, George Laclavére and G. Le Lionnaise; (from the United Kingdom) Ritchie Calder, H. Munro Fox and Joseph Needham; and (from the United States) Robert Oppenheimer.

The Academy was officially founded on December 24, 1960.

Among the 42 charter members of WAAS were several individuals who had played significant roles in creating other major global organizations: Joseph Needham, a cofounder of UNESCO, Lord Boyd Orr, first Director-General of the Food and Agriculture Organization (FAO), and G. Brock Chisholm, first Director-General of the World Health Organization (WHO). Four individuals were included posthumously as charter members of WAAS, including Albert Einstein, who was called the "spiritual father of the idea" in Hugo Boyko's 1961 book "Science and the Future of Mankind". The other three posthumous charter members are Australian botanist Sir Ian Clunies Ross, former President of the International Council of Scientific Research, John Adam Fleming, and ecologist Homer L. Shantz.

== Past fellows ==
- Knute Bjarne Buttedahl, educator and researcher, an expert on global education and international development
- Arthur C. Clarke, author of 2001: A Space Odyssey
- Sir John C. Eccles, Nobel laureate in medicine
- Buckminster Fuller, architect and systems theorist
- Hazel Henderson, environmental activist and futurist
- André Michel Lwoff, Nobel laureate in medicine
- Abraham Maslow, psychologist
- Yehudi Menuhin, violinist
- Margaret Mead, cultural anthropologist
- Alva Myrdal, Nobel laureate in economics
- Gunnar Myrdal, Nobel laureate in economics
- Philip Noel-Baker, Nobel peace laureate
- Linus Pauling, Nobel laureate in chemistry and peace
- Sarvepalli Radhakrishnan, president of India (elected as honorary fellow)
- Jonas Salk, developer of the Salk polio vaccine
- Vikram Sarabhai, chairman of the Indian Atomic Energy Commission
- Arne Tiselius, Nobel laureate in chemistry

== Research programs ==
WAAS conducts research, conferences and other activities in collaboration with a global network of partner organizations, including UN agencies and other international organizations, academies and research institutions, universities and civil society organizations.

The Academy has an on-going focus on issues related to peace, nuclear disarmament and global governance.

=== Global Challenges ===
A major focus of WAAS is an examination of the root causes of the multidimensional challenges that confront humanity today. The academy and fellows search for policy frameworks that offer solutions and opportunities for the 21st century. A view commonly expressed by WAAS President Garry Jacobs is that if these challenges are seen from a global evolutionary perspective, it can help identify the characteristics, which they all share. Fellows of WAAS work to address crises that are global in scope and that have a chance of being resolved through cooperative global action. In numerous papers by leading intellectuals, they have called for a paradigm change in thinking that is synthetic and integrated.

The Global Challenges project commenced officially at an international conference in Geneva in 2013, in collaboration with the United Nations Office. It aimed to consider in-depth the multiple challenges before the international community with a view to identifying the elements necessary for fundamental paradigm change. The Geneva conference (UNOG), hosted notable speakers such as Kassym-Jomart Tokayev, Rolf-Dieter Heuer, Emil Constantinescu, Peter Maurer, Herwig Schopper, Ernst Ulrich von Weizsäcker, and Anders Wijkman. The project ideas have been represented at more than a dozen conferences and have brought hundreds of diplomats, politicians, scientists and social leaders together, representing a wide range of organizations. Some of these include the Institute for Cultural Diplomacy, Club of Madrid, Club of Rome, European Leadership Network, European Movement International, Future World Foundation, Green Cross International, Library of Alexandria, Nizami Ganjavi International Centre, Partnership for Change, Montenegrin Academy of Sciences and Arts, Pugwash Conferences on Science and World Affairs and the World University Consortium. The meetings have led to the publication of more than 100 notable papers on a wide range of issues.

A collaboration between WAAS and Club of Rome resulted in an exploration of how humanity could work toward a new civilization initiative — one that recognizes the systemic interconnectedness of people, nations, sectors, activities, challenges, forces and consequences presiding over global development.

=== Global Leadership in the 21st Century ===
In 2019 WAAS launched a project called Global Leadership in the 21st Century (GL21) in conjunction with the United Nations Office at Geneva (UNOG) that sought to redefine the multilateral system and identify catalytic strategies to address pressing global challenges. The project consulted with CSOs, youth networks, IGOs, think tanks and educational institutions.

A five-day international conference In June 2020. organized by WAAS and UNOG hosted 20 partner organizations to examine the findings and recommendations of fIfteen working groups focused on specific challenges. A final conference at UNOG followed in December 2020 with more than 800 participants and 60 speakers from more than 100 countries. In total more than 70 organizations of the UN system, academia, civil society and 400 experts contributed to the program. Notable participants included Micheline Calmy-Rey, Vaira Vīķe-Freiberga, Yukio Takasu, Elisabeth Tichy-Fisslberger, Sandrine Dixson-Declève, Ismail Serageldin, Hazel Henderson, Remus Pricopie, Irina Bokova, Dušan Vujović, Emil Contantinescu, Michael Møller, Gabriela Cuevas Barron, Noel Curran, Kehkashan Basu, Jeffrey Sachs, Jane Fonda, Tedros Adhanom Ghebreyesus, María Fernanda Espinosa, Federico Mayor Zaragoza, Dorothy Tembo and Ernst Ulrich von Weizsäcker.

GL-21 proposed catalytic strategies to address a number of pressing challenges through promoting the active role of civil society and social movements. Other solutions proposed at the event included fostering a shift from competitive national security to an inclusive human security paradigm; developing an accessible global delivery system for higher education; restoring trust in the media via a global news media rating system; coordinating global research on COVID-19 and other areas related to security and sustainability; the integration of scientific research, policy-making and implementation; employment guarantee programs; direct central bank funding of the SDGs; accelerating the shift from private financial capital to sustainable investments; accelerating the shift to renewable energy; and a global platform for highlighting the views of humanity on pressing societal issues.

=== Abolition of Nuclear Weapons ===
Since its founding, WAAS has expressed concern over the role of science in the development and application of technologies that might endanger lives and threaten the ecosystem of Earth. Multiple papers on the topic have been published by academy fellows, such as John Scales Avery. Nuclear weapons have been a central concern based on the prominent role of some of the founding members of WAAS — J. Robert Oppenheimer, Joseph Rotblat, Albert Einstein and Bertrand Russell. Much of the technical work was taken up by Pugwash Conferences on Science and World Affairs — a parallel organization to WAAS in which several scientists were founding members of both organizations. This included Rotblat, who was awarded the Nobel Peace Prize together with Pugwash in 1995, "for their efforts to diminish the part played by nuclear arms in international politics and, in the longer run, to eliminate such arms".

Following the end of the Cold War, WAAS promoted initiatives that supported the complete abolition of nuclear weapons under the leadership of Harlan Cleveland (WAAS President 1990–98). Cleveland had previously served as US Assistant Secretary of State for International Relations during the Cuban Missile Crisis under President Kennedy and the UN Ambassador to NATO during the Johnson Administration.

In October 1994, the report of the International Commission on Peace and Food entitled "Uncommon Opportunities: Agenda for Peace & Equitable Development" called for the complete abolition of nuclear weapons and was first released by Cleveland at the Academy's General Assembly at Minneapolis. His call was then adopted by multiple agencies that helped spread the idea: James Gustave Speth, Administrator of UNDP in New York, and Federico Mayor Zaragoza, Director-General of UNESCO in Paris, before the official presentation to Boutros Boutros-Ghali, UN Secretary-General in New York in December 1994.

This was followed by a collaboration with the International Commission on Peace and Food on another conference in Delhi (2004), a NATO-funded workshop in Zagreb (2005) a meeting in Washington DC (2006) co-chaired by former US Defense Secretary Robert McNamara, a meeting at the UN in New York in association with the Global Security Institute (2007), a special session on nuclear abolition at the World Futures Conference, Toronto (2006) and participation in an international conference convened by the Government of India and organized by WAAS trustee Jasjit Singh (June 2008).

Research by WAAS has examined the legal implications of nuclear weapons within the context of the global rule of law, its impact on national sovereignty, nuclear threats to global security and nuclear abolition, actions to enhance global security, disarmament Initiatives, evaluations around universal nuclear disarmament, and control of the international arms trade.

=== Human Security ===
The term human security was first coined in the UNDP Human Development Report “New Dimensions of Human Security” in 1994, and highlighted its four characteristics: universal, people-centered, interdependent, and early prevention.

In 2016 WAAS began examining Human Security as an integrated principle for peace and security, including the 17 Sustainable Development Goals. In 2020 WAAS and the UN Office in Geneva examined the relevance of the idea of human security in the 21st century at two international conferences and proposed the establishment of a Global Institute for Human Security. A survey by WAAS, on behalf of the United Nations Human Security Unit (HSU), explored the awareness and understanding of human security among UN agencies, member states, parliamentarians, NGOs, and youth organizations. Based on these findings, WAAS and the Global Security Institute (GSI) adopted an integrated concept of security, that incorporates peace, security and human development. This pioneering work seeks to place the idea of human security on the mainstream agenda of how conflicts might be resolved, especially with regard to complex issues such as the war in Afghanistan (2021) and the Russian invasion of Ukraine (2022).

On June 14, 2022, the Consumer Technology Association (CTA) and WAAS announced that human security would be the main theme for CTA's 2023 annual Consumer Electronics Show to highlight the central role technological innovation can play in improving the personal security of people around the world. CTA adopted human security as an ongoing theme at its 2024 event in Las Vegas. At an event at the United Nations on 18 September 2023, during the 78th session of the UN General Assembly, The Consumer Technology Association announced that access to technology was a new eighth pillar of the Human Security concept, adding to the existing seven: political freedom, access to healthcare, economic security, community security, personal safety & mobility, environmental protection and food security. The CEO of CTA, Gary Shapiro made the announcement during a panel discussion hosted by Samantha Murphy Kelly, Senior Writer for CNN Business.

WAAS was commissioned by the United Nations Trust Fund for Human Security (UNTFHS) in October 2022 to develop and execute a world-first awareness campaign on human security, the Human Security For All (HS4A) campaign, which was completed in March 2024. The campaign collaborated with dozens of organizations, educators, scientists, influencers and faith groups to spread the message of human security, that included the Consumer Technology Association, the 2023 United Nations Climate Change Conference, World Earth Day event EarthX, the Techsauce Global Summit in Thailand, the International Amateur Radio Union, Milan Design Week, SpellBee International, the Association of Foreign Press Correspondents USA, and the Conference of NGOs.

A partnership between the Human Security For All campaign and the Inter-Parliamentary Union sought to deepen the understanding of human security among 180 Member Parliaments worldwide and the organization included the concept of human security in its final declaration in Geneva in March 2024. The collaboration produced a toolkit for parliamentarians titled “Human Security and Common Security to Build Peace” which outlines the mechanisms parliamentarians can use to advocate for and implement human security and common security approaches and provides essential guidance for parliamentarians looking to shape their country's approach to security.

=== Funding the Sustainable Development Goals ===
WAAS collaborates with London-based social impact investment firm Force for Good to implement the United Nations Sustainable Development Goals. Force For Good is a strategic research center of WAAS and is the author of five reports on ways to close the gap in the implementation of the 17 UN Sustainable Development Goals. They work to leverage the strengths of governments, private companies, and NGOS to solve big world problems. They support major organizations in their efforts to tackle urgent global issues, including climate change, social inclusion, and sustainable growth. Their reports suggest strategies to mobilize private sector investments, harness the power of scalable technologies such as AI and quantum computing, and examine how science policy can be adapted to benefit the needs of society.

=== WAAS Innovative Finance Initiatives (WIFI) ===
The Future Capital Initiative (FCI), was launched in New York on September 11, 2019 at the [United Nations] headquarters on the initiative of the United Nations Office for Partnerships (UNOP), United Nations Conference on Trade and Development (UNCTAD) and WAAS. FCI is an alliance of thought leaders, economic and financial experts convened to promote initiatives which enhance investments in the 17 sustainable development goals (SDGs) and related sustainable development objectives. The NY launch was followed by a workshop organized by WAAS at the World Bank the following week in collaboration with Fridays for the Future.

FCI served as a focal point for bringing together several other WAAS-supported financial initiatives. Capital as a Force for Good: Transforming Capitalism for a Sustainable Future, was, co-founded by WAAS Fellow and Trustee Ketan Patel, was established to support financing of the UN Agenda 2030 by channeling higher levels of private financial investment into the SDGs. The first report was released at the WAAS-UN conference in December 2020 was based on a study of the investment portfolios of 30 of the world's largest banks. The second report released in 2021 expanded the research to 60 banks and estimated that the SDGs face a financing gap of up to $100 trillion as a result of COVID-19 and other developments.

The Academy's Tao of Finance project was initiated in 2015 to examine the feasibility of creating direct central bank complementary currencies for investment in the SDGs. Its findings have been 2021 published as a Report to the World Academy entitled Financing our Future by Stefan Brunnhuber, project leader and WAAS Trustee.

The Integral Investing Project addresses investment in businesses as a dimension of an integral approach to overall business management, with special focus on achieving the SDGs within the planetary boundaries. Integral Investing: From Profit to Prosperity was published in 2020 as a report to WAAS by WAAS Fellow Mariana Bozesan based on decades of research as an entrepreneur-investor and interviews with more than 20 leading financial experts.

A fourth offshoot project is focused on the feasibility of financing the Sustainable Development Goals through the insurance and pension fund system by special public bonds with subsidized yields which reflect the true value and overall return to society of the positive and negative externalities associated with investments in the SDGs. The project is headed by Yehuda Kahane, founder of the YK Center in Israel and Moshe Bareket, Director General of the Israeli Capital Market Insurance & Savings Authority (CMISA).^{,} WAAS Fellows participated in numerous events at COP27 Egypt, including a panel on DATE organized by the UNFCCC's Global Innovation Hub and YK Center at the Global Financial Solutions Summit. Panelists included Massamba Thioye of UNFCCC, Yehuda Kahane, Ketan Patel, Stefan Brunnhuber, Phoebe Koundouri, Jeffrey Sachs, Moshe Bareket and YKC co-founder Tal Ronen, presenting innovative financial solutions for addressing climate change and other essential investments in the Sustainable Development Goals.

=== Science, Society and Sustainability ===
WAAS is exploring the impact of science and technology on society and human knowledge. A science and technology project focuses on the social consequences and implications of knowledge and science policy-making, a central tenet on which the academy was originally founded. In 2015, WAAS hosted an international conference at CERN in Geneva in collaboration with the UN Office at Geneva, to explore the impact of science and technology across different sectors and the responsibility of science in social outcomes. Inspired by the successful example of CERN and the Sesame project (Synchrotron-Light for Experimental Science and Applications in the Middle East) in the Middle East on the model of "Science for peace", the Board of WAAS decided in 2016, in Dubrovnik, to start a similar initiative to promote peaceful cooperation in the former Yugoslavia. It called for the creation of a large international research institute for South-East Europe to promote scientific, political, and social cooperation among the countries of Albania, Bosnia and Herzegovina, Bulgaria, Kosovo, the Former Yugoslav Republic of Macedonia, Montenegro, Serbia, and Slovenia. Croatia agreed in principle, while Greece participated as an observer. The project facilitated conferences at the International Centre for Theoretical Physics in Trieste in 2013, and two conferences on artificial intelligence and cognitive computing in association with IEEE in Milan and Bari, Italy, in 2019. WAAS, in collaboration with UNESCO, The Club of Rome, Vinča Institute of Nuclear Sciences (VINS), the Serbian Association of Economists and other organizations conducted an international conference titled "Basic Sciences and Sustainable Development" on September 20–22, 2022 In June 2022, WAAS and the Consumer Technology Association announced collaboration focusing on the role of technology in addressing human security needs by conducting conference sessions and announcing special awards for innovative technology at the January 2023 Consumer Electronics Show.

=== Economy and Employment ===
The 2008 financial crisis led to the adoption of quantitative easing, the creation and injection of funds by central governments to support financial institutions, markets, and the general economy. As the true magnitude of this multidimensional crisis and its long-term impacts on employment, incomes, and environmental sustainability became more apparent, a team of WAAS researchers embarked on a research project and created Cadmus, a journal founded by Fellows of the Academy, to reexamine the fundamental facts of prevailing economic theory in an article entitled "The Wealth of Nations Revisited." Over the next six years, this led to a series of international conferences and colloquia at Trieste (2013), San Paolo (2014), Gainesville, Florida (2015), Lisbon (2016), Cape Town, (2017) and Paris (2018).

These discussions led to the establishment of an international multidisciplinary working group on new economic theory consisting of more than fifty researchers from WAAS, the Club of Rome, and other institutions working on issues related to economy, finance, business, psychology, sociology, law, political science, ecology, and environment. It led to more than 100 research papers on the economy, ecology, employment, money, and finance. Prominent members of the transdisciplinary working group included Tomas Björkman, Stefan Brunnhuber (economy & finance), Orio Giarini (economy and environment), Enrico Giovannini (economy and statistics), Heitor Gurgulino de Souza (education), Hazel Henderson (economy and ecology), Bernard Lietaer (finance), Garry Jacobs (business, development, and employment), Hunter Lovins (environment), Winston Nagan (law, human rights, and sustainable development), Gunter Pauli (economy and entrepreneurship), Kate Pickett (social equity), Carlos Alvarez-Pereira (computer modeling, ecology, technology, and systems theory), Ivo Slaus (politics and science), Mark Swilling (sustainable development), Joanilio Teixeira (economy) and Alberto Zucconi (psychology).

An initial effort to synthesize the findings of the project led to the publication of "Quest for a New Paradigm in Economics - A Synthesis of Views of the New Economics Working Group" in 2017. The paper presents a value-based, transdisciplinary, human-centered, ecologically sustainable, theoretical framework for economic theory and public policy to promote sustainable human security and wellbeing. A parallel initiative by the Club of Rome that addressed similar issues led to the publication of "Come On! Capitalism, Short-Termism, Population and Destruction of the Planet" in 2017 and to the formation of the Transformational Economics Commission in 2021.

Since 2019 the research has been integrated into a more comprehensive transdisciplinary project on Global Leadership in the 21st Century, that examines the commonalities and interdependencies between all major sectors of global social existence. A second focus has been on Human Security as an integrating perspective for all dimensions of human welfare and wellbeing, and a third on innovative financial initiatives to fund investments around the UN Sustainable Development Goals.

Employment has occupied a central place in the work of WAAS. Research has been done on economic theory and policy and has included a number of conferences and numerous published papers. WAAS has built on the recommendation originally made in the Report of the International Commission on Peace and Food to the UN in 1994: "Uncommon Opportunities: Agenda for Peace & Equitable Development." The report states that: "Recognizing the right of every citizen to employment is the essential basis and the most effective strategy for generating the necessary political will to provide jobs for all." WAAS has argued that employment within a market economy can be compared to the right to vote within a democracy because access to paying jobs provides the means to exercise other economic and social rights. Randall Wray and others argue that the cost of unemployment in terms of lost skills and capacities, degeneration of physical and mental health, crime, drug use, and social unrest exceeds the cost of public sector employment generation programs, such as demonstrated by India's Rural Employment Programs.

=== Global Higher Education--World University Consortium ===
The founders of WAAS were committed to the idea of establishing a World University under the auspices of the Academy, with the aim of fostering the growth of knowledge and cultivating enlightened judgment around the needs and aspirations of people. The idea was to identify and serve the common interest of humankind by offering inquiring minds a way to relate their intellectual specialties to the idea of human dignity — a process that would be open to continual clarification in a changing social environment. The original Declaration of the World University in 1960 stated that "the timeliness of the idea of a world university is beyond reasonable reservation. The expansion of science and technology has put at our disposal an unparalleled instrument of fulfillment or destruction; if man is to take the future evolution of body, mind and civilization in his own hands it is imperative to find more effective ways of integrating what he knows with what he does." The founders developed a management structure and executive committee, and established a set of operational centers in leading educational and research institutes in several countries.

Inspired by the original vision of the Academy's founders and reshaped by the global challenges and emerging opportunities at the time, the Academy established the World University Consortium (WUC) in 2013 in association with eminent international institutions. The organizations mission was to evolve and promote the development of accessible, affordable, quality higher education worldwide based on a human-centered approach. Their approach was to shift from specialized expertise to contextualized knowledge within a trans-disciplinary conceptual framework — that better reflected the complexity and integration of the real world.

At the UNOG-WAAS conference at Geneva in 2013, WAAS President Garry Jacobs posed the question: "If you were trying to create a global system of world-class higher education accessible and affordable to everyone, how would you do it?"

=== Mind, Thinking and Creativity ===
The Academy has concluded that current pressing global challenges reflect fundamental limitations in prevailing modes of intellectual thinking and analysis. It has called for radical advances in the approach to major social problems from fragmented, disciplinary analysis and piecemeal policies which address each issue as separate and independent of the others and mechanistic systems thinking which links together and aggregates phenomena without considering their underlying social dynamics. WAAS proposes a shift to integrated thinking that recognizes the underlying deeper level factors, forces and processes at work in all social dynamics. It approaches individual aspects and dimensions of social reality in relation to the whole and examines the interdependences as well as the deeper level of transdisciplinary principles at work. It also seeks to reconcile the objectivity of the natural sciences with the subjective value-based and ethical dimensions so central to the social sciences.

This project is tied to the Academy's central mission of integration of art and science, and its work developing new pedagogy, transdisciplinary social theory and an integrated organization of knowledge in education. As mathematician and deep thinker William Byers stated, "Learning is also about moving from one way of thinking about a situation to another, more complex, way of thinking." Earlier stages in the project included events on Limits to Rationality Hyderabad, India, 2008, two roundtables on Mind, Thinking and Creativity, Dubrovnik, Croatia, 2016 and 2017.

The Academy's research has drawn on insights regarding mental processes by Einstein, William Byers, Sri Aurobindo and other renowned thinkers from around the world. Its approach is based on the idea that "Mind is an instrument of analysis and synthesis, but not of essential knowledge." The Project has explored implicit assumptions and barriers that confine our thinking within narrow social and conceptual boundaries, the consequent errors and limitations, ways in which we can learn to consciously broaden the range and enhance the quality of rational thinking and develop the capacity for more intuitive creative mental processes. Research includes analysis of the inherent limitations and blindspots implicit in the prevailing fragmentary, rationalist, materialistic, mechanistic approach to understanding and solving human problems, including an exploration of new ways of knowing generated by the emerging sciences of systems theory, complexity, autopoiesis and recent discoveries in the physical, biological and social sciences. It has applied this approach in the formulation of new thinking in fields such as economy, social transformation and a transdisciplinary theory of society.^{,}

=== Societal Transformation ===
WAAS has been concerned with the underlying forces and processes affecting global social evolution since the time of its founding. It has examined the process of social change from various perspectives, in different contexts and fields of activity, and concluded that what is required is clear and complete knowledge of the process of conscious social evolution. Former President of WAAS Harlan Cleveland coined the phrase "revolution of rising expectations" to reflect the subjective social and psychological forces that were underlying the objective technological and institutional dimensions of development observed in fast growing East Asian countries after WWII. Through meetings, roundtable discussions and publications, WAAS has sought to identify these forces and the ways in which to convert the long, slow trial and error process of social evolution into a conscious process of social transformation with emphasis on the catalytic role of values, ideas, organizations, technologies and leadership in this process.

The Academy's research seeks to identify the common underlying social processes applicable to all fields and levels of society, with the aim of evolving a trans-disciplinary science of society.^{,}

A special session at the 1998 WAAS General Assembly in Vancouver emphasized the need for formulation of comprehensive, multidimensional theory of social development incorporating political, legal, economic, technological, social, cultural and psychological dimensions.^{,} Building on this, a conference in Chennai in 1999 advocated a global social movement to mobilize the underlying social forces for a reinvention of the multilateral institutions to recognize the inseparable global unity of global society. The WAAS publication Human Choice: Genetic Code of Social Development (1999) examines the powers of mind to organize the physical materials, social energies and mental ideas of humanity to achieve greater material, social, mental and spiritual advancement.

Two five-day workshops on the role of the individual and the process of social accomplishment were conducted at Dubrovnik in 2014.^{,} They explored the role of the characteristics and social impact of original thinkers, pioneers and innovators, and the process by which these leaders act as catalysts of social innovation.

WAAS also conducted two sessions on social transformation during the WAAS@60 conference (2020–21) and published a collection of articles in Cadmus Journal examining the deep systemic change and societal transformation needed to protect humanity and all life on Earth.

== Publications ==
- Cadmus Journal: a twice yearly print and electronic journal focusing on issues related to economy, security and global governance.
- Eruditio Journal: a twice yearly electronic journal for examination of ideas and perspectives that fall beyond the purview of traditional academic publications.
- WAAS Papers: Articles, papers and presentations by Fellows of the academy.
- Reports to the World Academy of Art & Science: Books by WAAS Fellows accepted by the Board of Trustees as official reports to the academy

== Management ==
The academy is managed by a 24-member board of trustees and an eight-member executive committee. The principal officers are Garry Jacobs, President & Chief Executive Officer, Alberto Zucconi, chair of the board.

=== Past presidents ===
1. Lord John Boyd Orr
2. Hugo Boyko
3. Stuart Mudd
4. Marion Mushkat
5. Detlev Bronk
6. Harold Lasswell
7. Walter Isard
8. Ronald St. John Macdonald
9. Carl-Göran Hedén
10. Harlan Cleveland
11. Walter Truett Anderson
12. Jeffrey Schwartz
13. Ivo Slaus
14. Heitor Gurgulino de Souza
