= Western Behavioral Sciences Institute =

American-based nonprofit organization

The Western Behavioral Sciences Institute (WBSI) was founded in 1958, in La Jolla, California, as an independent, nonprofit organization whose goal is researching human affairs with the intention of advancing long distance education. Its early studies included research on the leadership of small groups, communication in large organizations, international negotiation, simulation studies of deterrence strategies for defense, building educational games, studies of self-directed therapeutic groups, crime and violence prevention, and policy studies in poverty, race relations, education, and family life.

== History ==
Founded by psychologist Richard Farson, physicist Paul Lloyd and social psychologist Wayman Crow, the Institute came to utilize several disciplines interested in human relations - sociology, political science, philosophy, economics, anthropology, etc. Its staff has always included outstanding leaders in the social sciences.

WBSI became best known as the place Carl Rogers, considered by many to be the most influential psychologist in American history, developed his theories of group behavior, or where psychologist Abraham Maslow wrote his most important book, Toward a Psychology of Being, and the organization that produced the winner of the Academy Award for Documentary Feature, Journey Into Self.

In 1981, WBSI began a series of programs that pioneered the use of teleconferencing in education, leadership development, policy formation, mental health, and the formation of global communities of scholars, scientists and leaders. The leading example is WBSI's pioneering School of Management and Strategic Studies, first implemented on EIES. It was the first program to employ online distance education, supplemented by twice-yearly meetings in La Jolla. Faculty and lecturers included leaders and innovators in academia, politics, science, business, and the arts such as Harlan Cleveland, Mary Douglas, Langdon Winner, Stewart Brand, Howard Nemerov, Robert Reich, Walter Orr Roberts, Rusty Schweickart, Nicholas Johnson, and Paul Levinson. Student participants included CEOs of major corporations, high-ranking U.S. Army generals, scientists, renowned writers and other professionals including Paul Funk, Barry McCaffrey, Gloria Feldt, Donald B. Straus, Marlon Brando, Wesley Clark, Michael Crichton, Wayne Peterson and many others.

In 1991, a deep economic recession in the U. S. seriously affected WBSI's foundation, corporate and governmental supporters, as well as its key individual benefactors. Without adequate financial reserves, the institute was forced to enter a period of dormancy from which it only recently emerged. Gifts from former trustee Douglas Strain and philanthropist Sol Price has made this regrowth possible.

WBSI's current interests are first in the development of its centerpiece program, the International Leadership Forum, an online global think tank composed of eighty leaders discussing the great policy issues of our time. The Institute is also concerned with fostering improved distance education, enabling the collaboration of independent scholars, using the Internet and mass media for metaprofessional development in mental health, and in the further application of global communications technology to serve humanitarian goals.
