= International Center for Peace and Development =

Non-profit, non-governmental organization based in Napa, California

The International Center for Peace and Development (ICPD) was established in 1997 as a non-profit, non-governmental organization based in Napa, California, to continue the work initiated by the International Commission on Peace and Food (ICPF).

== History ==
ICPF was constituted in 1989 by a group of 25 scientists, professionals, international administrators, business, social and political leaders from 15 nations. Over a six-year period ICPF conducted a series of international conferences and research projects on a wide range of issues concerning global security, conversion of resources from military to civilian purposes, food security, employment, economic development, and the environment.

The commission’s work focused on the development problems of poorer countries such as India, the challenges of rapid transition in Eastern Europe, particularly in the nations of the former Soviet Union, and the prospects and opportunities for peaceful development in the Middle East. From the outset, the objective the Commission was to evolve practical strategies that could be implemented at the field level to demonstrate the feasibility of accelerating the development process.

The most noteworthy of these efforts was a study conducted on employment potentials in India in which a strategy was formulated for generating 100 million new jobs in the country within 10 years. Another study was conducted on the utilization of military resources for environmental protection. In addition the commission studied and evolved proposals to address concerns about rising unemployment in the West. The general findings and recommendations of the Commission are summarized in a report entitled Uncommon Opportunities: Agenda for Peace and Equitable Development, which was presented to the Secretary General of the United Nations for formal consideration by member countries.

After submission of the report to the UN, the Commission members decided that the next stage of work should focus on implementation of its recommendations. The International Center was established to carry on the work of the Commission. Since then the Center works in collaboration with other organizations with similar programmatic objectives, including World Academy of Art and Science; The Mother's Service Society, Pondicherry, India; and Centre for Strategic and International Studies, New Delhi.

== Projects ==
Over the past decade ICPD has collaborated with a number of organizations internationally, including the World Academy of Art & Science, MSS Research, the social science division of The Mother’s Service Society (India), and the Global Security Institute (USA) on a variety of research projects including:

- Formulation of a comprehensive theory of social development
- Theoretical study on the evolution of money as a social institution
- Strategies for the abolition of nuclear weapons
- Advanced methods for early childhood education
- Strategies to accelerate employment generation
- Theory of money
- Origins & basis for democracy
- Foundations for the future of science
