= No Excuses (book) =

No Excuses: 9 Ways Women Can Change How We Think about Power
- Author: Gloria Feldt
- Language: English
- Subject: Leadership
- Genre: Feminism
- Publisher: Seal Press
- Publication date: September 2010
- Publication place: United States
- Media type: Hardcover, paperback, eBook
- Pages: 384 pp
- ISBN: 1580053289

No Excuses: 9 Ways Women Can Change How We Think about Power is a nonfiction book by women's rights advocate, feminist and speaker Gloria Feldt released by Seal Press in September 2010.

== Overview ==
In the book, Feldt encourages women to step into positions of power and leadership. Instead of placing blame, according to the publisher, the author provides inspiration, hope, and courage—as well as concrete power tools, namely, the nine ways, as the book's subtitle eludes—to aid women in securing equality and justice for themselves.

The author spoke about her theory of "no excuses" on PBS in an October 2010 interview, telling host Bonnie Erbe, "In so many ways, this is women's moment. It seems like all the rest of the world knows it. ... But I don't think that women know it yet.". She also appeared on C-SPAN's Book TV in March 2011 on a panel of women at the Tucson Festival of Books to discuss No Excuses.

== Reception ==
Publishers Weekly described the book as offering "practical advice for women who want to be active in politics, business, or their personal lives."

Jewish Women's Archive wrote in its October 2010 review that "No Excuses gets to the heart of the problem: Doors have been opened ... but not enough women are walking through them."

Manisha Thakor, in a review on Forbes online magazine, noted that the author "argues that we women limit ourselves by adhering to outdated social structures and by succumbing to pressure to conform to society’s standards."

On The Issues Magazine pointed out, "As the title of her book suggests, (Feldt) contends that women have 'no excuses' for allowing men to continue controlling the majority of money and political power in the U.S."
