= International Leadership Forum =

American-based think tank

The International Leadership Forum (ILF) was an American non-partisan, Internet-based think tank composed of policy leaders. The Forum participants participated in online policy forums to discuss the major issues facing global society.

The ILF evolved from the Western Behavioral Sciences Institute (WBSI), building on the Institute's work in the creation of online communities. When WBSI closed down in 2012, the ILF and the Digest were also discontinued. Richard Farson, President of WBSI, died in mid-2017 at age 90.

Participants included former US ambassador to NATO Harlan Cleveland, author/filmmaker Michael Crichton anthropologist Mary Catherine Bateson, psychoanalyst Douglass Carmichael, Biospherian Jane Poynter, survey researcher Daniel Yankelovich, former president of Planned Parenthood Gloria Feldt, actress and former chairman of the National Endowment of the Arts Jane Alexander, Yale economist and political scientist Charles Lindblom, author Ralph Keyes, former U.S. Federal Communications Commission (FCC) commissioner Nicholas Johnson. Participants also included other ILF Fellows and guest experts.
