= CEA 2030 =

CEA 2030 Multi-Room Audio Cabling Standard defines cabling and connectors for use in distributing analog and digital audio signals throughout a home. It is developed by the R3 Audio Systems Committee of the Consumer Electronics Association or CEA.

== Scope of the standard ==
The Electronic Industries Alliance or EIA now known as the Consumer Electronics Association or CEA standard ANSI/CEA-2030 as of the 3/30/2005 Publication date defines wire topologies, wire gauge in American Wire Gauge or AWG, twisted pair designation, wire routing and control locations.

== See also ==
- Consumer Electronics Association
