= Birthrights: A Bill of Rights for Children =

- Author: Richard Farson
- Language: English
- Genre: Non-fiction
- Publisher: Macmillan
- Publication date: 1974
- ISBN: 9780025371705

Birthrights: A Bill of Rights for Children is a book by American psychologist Richard Farson.
