= Richard Farson =

- Born: November 16, 1926; Chicago, Illinois, U.S.
- Died: June 13, 2017 (aged 90); La Jolla, California, U.S.
- Scientific career
- Fields: Psychologist
- Workplaces: Western Behavioral Sciences Institute

Richard Farson Ph.D., (November 16, 1926 – June 13, 2017) was an American psychologist, author, and educator. He was the president and chief executive officer of the Western Behavioral Sciences Institute, which he co-founded in 1958 with physicist Paul Lloyd and social psychologist Wayman Crow.

The non-profit WBSI explores ways in which human relations can be improved, democracy strengthened, and people better enabled to reach their potential. Farson directed WBSI's centerpiece program, the International Leadership Forum, a think tank of influential leaders that addresses critical policy issues of the day.

Long interested in the field of design, Farson was founding dean of the School of Design at the California Institute of the Arts and a 30-year member of the board of Directors of the International Design Conference in Aspen, of which he was president for seven years. He served on the American Institute of Architects Board of Directors and was a Senior Fellow of the Design Futures Council.

== Education and early career ==
Farson attended the University of Minnesota as a naval officer trainee and then Occidental College, where he received bachelor's and master's degrees. His psychology graduate study was done at the University of California, Los Angeles. He then attended Harvard Business School as a Ford Foundation Training Fellow on the Human Relations Faculty, and the University of Chicago, from which he received a Ph.D. in psychology in 1955.

Farson met psychologist Carl Rogers at Occidental College in the summer of 1949 and began what was to be a lifelong association. Rogers invited Farson to study with him at the University of Chicago where he became Rogers’ research assistant and eventually an intern and counselor at the Counseling Center and a research associate at the Industrial Relations Center. Farson and Rogers collaborated over several decades on a number of research, education, publication and media projects, including their widely reprinted article, "Active Listening," which introduced that term into the lexicon of human relations training, and the Academy Award-winning documentary film, "Journey Into Self."

== Career ==
Following two years of postdoctoral active duty as a research officer studying motivation, morale, leadership and training at the U.S. Navy Personnel Research and Development Center in San Diego, Farson entered private practice in La Jolla, California, as a consulting psychologist. At the same time he teamed with his former University of Chicago professor, Thomas Gordon, best known for his books and programs in parent and leadership effectiveness training, to form the management consulting firm Gordon and Farson Associates.

In 1958 Farson, along with physicist Paul E. Lloyd and social psychologist Wayman Crow, formed the Western Behavioral Sciences Institute (WBSI), an independent, nonprofit organization devoted to research, education and advanced study in human affairs. As president of WBSI during its first decade, Farson led a number of research projects in education, leadership, communication in large organizations, self-directed therapeutic groups and the use of mass media approaches to community mental health. In the latter effort, he conducted the first televised psychotherapy group in the series "Human Encounter," aired in 1966.

After a decade as president, Farson elected to become chairman of the board of WBSI and accepted an appointment as the founding dean of the newly formed School of Design at the California Institute of the Arts, where the emphasis was on social and environmental design. Farson's continuing interest in these issues is also evidenced by his 30-year membership on the board of directors of the International Design Conference in Aspen, a forum for interdisciplinary discussions of the designed environment. He was twice elected its president, serving from 1976 to 1980 and again from 1994 to 1997. In 1999 he was elected the Public Director (non-architect) to the national board of directors of the American Institute of Architects, and in 2001 was named Senior Fellow of the Design Futures Council.

From 1973 to 1975, Farson was president of Esalen Institute, a non-profit organization devoted to the exploration of human potential. In 1975, he joined the faculty of the Saybrook Graduate School and Research Center, where he supervised the doctoral research of advanced graduate students.

Returning to the presidency of WBSI in 1979, Farson guided the institute's development of educational, scholarly and therapeutic communities formed through the use of advanced computer communication technologies. The centerpiece of this effort was the School of Management and Strategic Studies, a network of senior executives from 26 countries who joined a distinguished faculty to deliberate, via computer conferencing, on the new requirements of leadership. This project, begun in 1981, launched the now burgeoning field of online distance learning.

== Civil rights ==
A student of social movements, Farson had a long-time involvement with civil rights issues, notably his pioneering efforts on behalf of women's and children's rights, marked by his 1969 Look magazine article, "The Rage of Women," and his 1974 book, Birthrights: A Bill of Rights for Children, each of which was the first to bring to a national audience the need for legislative and policy reform.

== Death ==
Farson died in La Jolla, California, on June 13, 2017. He was 90.

== Books ==
- Making the Invisible Visible: Essays by the Fellows of the International Leadership Forum (editor)
- The Power of Design: A Force for Transforming Everything
- Management of the Absurd: Paradoxes in Leadership (with foreword by Michael Crichton)
- Whoever Makes the Most Mistakes Wins: The Paradox of Innovation
- Birthrights: A Bill of Rights for Children
