= Carl-Göran Hedén =

Carl-Göran Hedén (September 11, 1920 – June 8, 2009) was a distinguished Swedish scholar in the fields of Microbiology, Biotechnology and microbial physiology, D.Sc., Professor of the Karolinska Institute (Stockholm), where he earned his doctorate 1951, publishing his thesis on the infection of E.Coli B with the Bacteriophage T2. He was also a Member of the Royal Swedish Academy of Engineering Sciences since 1959 and of the Royal Swedish Academy of Sciences since 1975, a Fellow of the World Academy of Art and Science (WAAS), and founder of the first Chair in biotechnology in Sweden. Heden was one of the founders (1968) and first President of the International Organisation for Biotechnology and Bioengineering (IOBB). He was the first active chairman of UNEP/UNESCO/ICRO's Panel on Applied Microbiology and Biotechnology, main initiator of UNESCO/UNEP's Microbiological Resource Centers (MIRCEN), one of the organizers of the 1st Global Impact of Applied Microbiology Conference (Stockholm, 1963), founder (1990) and the first Director of the Biofocus Foundation (BF). Since 1976 he was the first director of MIRCEN-Stockholm. Professor Heden was also a President of the WAAS. In 1986 he was honored by the Swedish Inventors Association as "the Inventor of the Year".
