= Journey into Self =

- Directed by: Bill McGaw
- Produced by: Bill McGaw
- Narrated by: Stanley Kramer
- Production companies: Western Behavioral Sciences Institute; San Diego State University
- Distributed by: Western Behavioral Sciences Institute
- Release date: 1968
- Running time: 47 minutes
- Country: United States
- Language: English

Journey into Self is a 1968 documentary film introduced by Stanley Kramer, and produced and directed by Bill McGaw.

Journey into Self (1968)

The film portrays a 16-hour group therapy session for eight well-adjusted people who had never met before. The session was led by psychologists Carl Rogers and Richard Farson. The participants included a cashier, a theology student, a teacher, a principal, a housewife, and three businessmen.

It won the Academy Award for Best Documentary Feature in 1968.

== See also ==
- List of American films of 1968
