= Paz Buttedahl =

Canadian academic

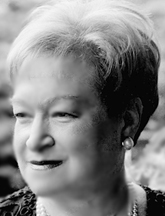
Buttedahl in 1998

Paz Buttedahl (April 8, 1942 – October 8, 2007) was a Canadian professor at the University of British Columbia and Royal Roads University. She was a researcher and educator specializing in global education and international development issues. She was married to Knute Buttedahl and was the co-founder and president of Buttedahl R & D Associates (BRDA), based in Vancouver, British Columbia. She was also the founder and director of VIA - Vancouver Institute for the Americas, with a main campus in Vancouver and an overseas campus in Santiago, Chile. Buttedahl was a member of the World Academy of Art and Science and participated in the Peacebuilding Commission.

== Early life ==
Buttedahl was born Cecilia Paz Goycoolea Grunwald in Vicuña Mackenna, Santiago, Chile, to an upper-middle-class family of European descent. Her father came from a Roman Catholic family originally from Euskadi Basque Country, Spain, and her mother came from a Jewish Eastern European family. She had two sisters, Loreto and Sofia, and a brother, Valerio.

== Education ==
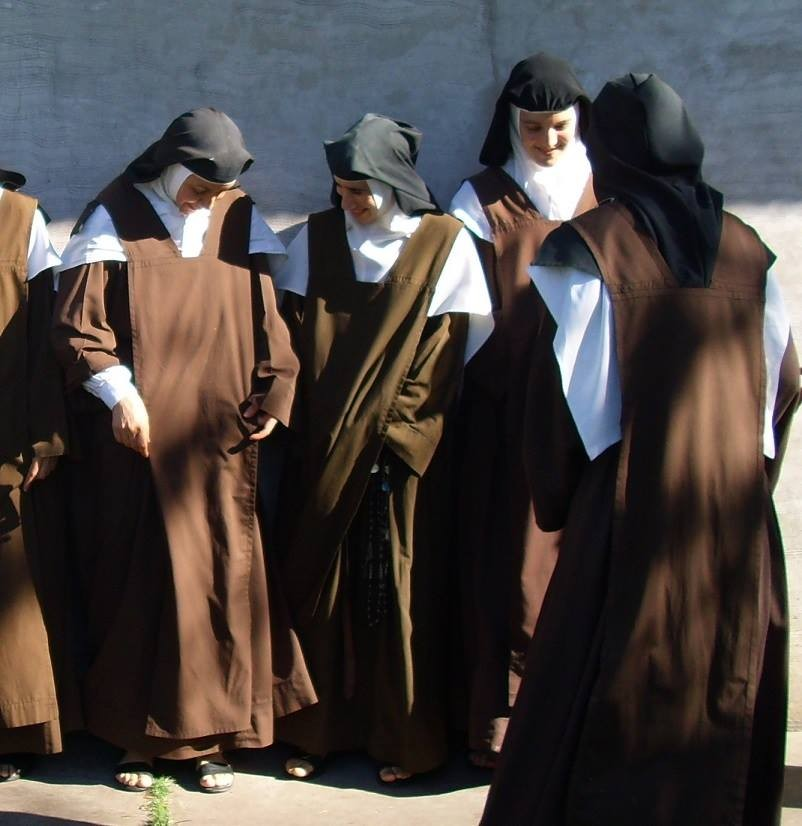
Carmelite nuns with their religious habits (in Nogoyá, Argentina).

Buttedahl attended a boarding school that was run by nuns. Feeling an affinity with the nuns' lifestyle, she joined their order, the Teresian Carmelite Missionaries in the World (CMT), after graduating from high school and was sent to work at a convent located in Nogoyá, Argentina: Santa Teresa delle Suore Carmelitane Missionarie Teresiane. After several years at the convent and prior to taking her nun's vows, she decided to pursue education, thereby terminating her service at the convent. She became an elementary school teacher at Immaculata of Buenos Aires, a private Roman Catholic all-girls school in Argentina.

While teaching at the school, Buttedahl became the holder of an international scholarship with the help of the church. She moved to the United States to produce a television program for Latin American children that focused on current affairs and promoted staying in school. Her project was successful in the U.S., and she had an opportunity to obtain a scholarship from Florida State University in Tallahassee, where she earned her doctorate in adult learning and international development. This was also where she met her second husband, Dr. Knute Buttedahl. In 1975, they moved to Toronto, Ontario, with her two children from her first marriage.

== Career ==
Buttedahl and Knute worked together at the Canadian Association for Adult Education (now the Canadian Association for the Study of Adult Education) in Toronto, Ontario, until they moved to Vancouver, British Columbia in 1978, taking up an academic position at the Faculty of Education at the University of British Columbia. She would eventually return to Ontario in the mid-1980s, becoming project manager and program director for the International Development Research Centre (IDRC), while her husband worked with the Canadian International Development Agency (CIDA), conducting and implementing projects on international development and global education, mainly in Latin America and Asia. They would return to Vancouver in the late 1990s.

In 1980, while working in academia, she and Knute co-founded a non-government-organization (NGO) to provide services in Global Education to developing countries. They launched Buttedahl R&D Associates (BRDA ), an R&D firm which published adult education material and international development reports about sustainable education, Global R&D management, and integration of academics and field research working across borders, multicultural and multilingual settings, and multiple time zones to ensure smooth transfer of new knowledge and technology to other groups or departments involved in innovation. BRDA was based in Vancouver, providing consultancy services in research, editing, and publishing to projects funded by international agencies and organizations. Their clients included the Canadian International Development Agency (CIDA), The United Nations Education, Scientific and Cultural Organization (UNESCO), the U.S. Agency for International Development (USAID), and the Organization of American States (OAS).

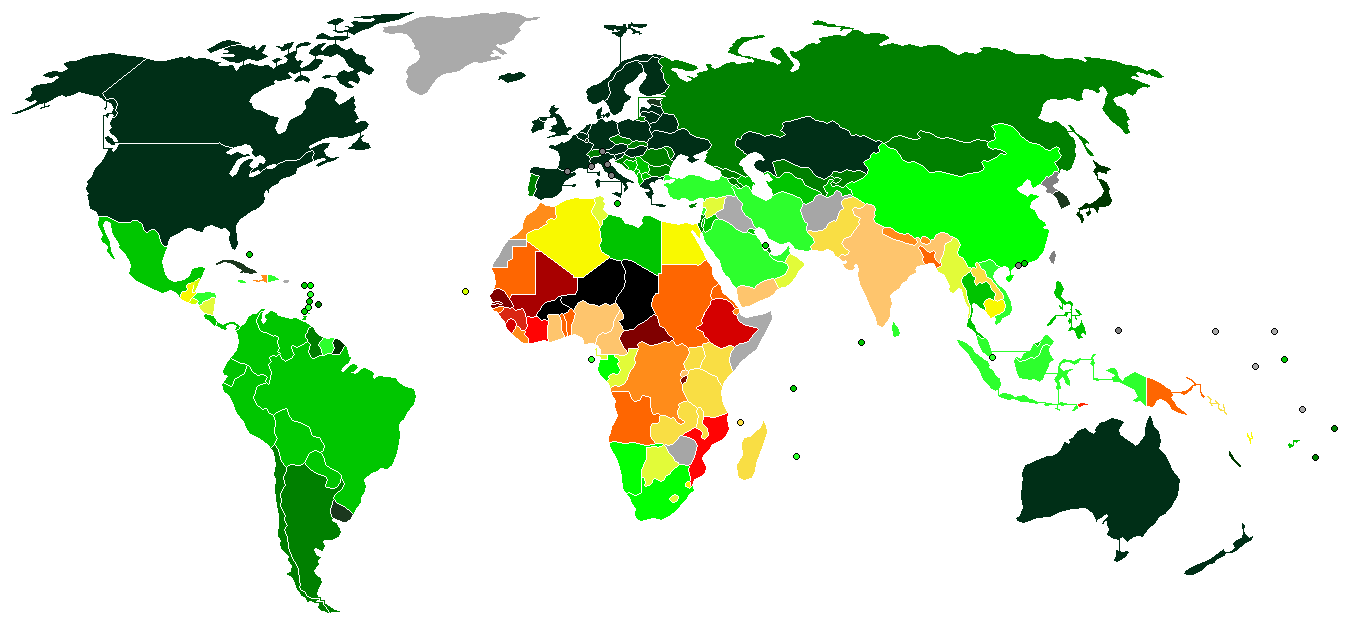
World map indicating Education Index (according to 2007/2008 Human Development Report)

In 1998, Buttedahl launched VIA Vancouver Institute for the Americas, a Global Education arm at UBC operating in partnership with the Vancouver Institute Lectures program, to support research on Human Resources Development and Training Programs for worldwide implementations. VIA Vancouver Institute for the Americas assisted programs under the umbrella of UNESCO and CIDA, and it also participated in large multinational Educational Reform implementations.

After the death of Knute, she began to work on the evolution of VIA's own creative projects centered in women in development, and took an academic position in Victoria BC at Royal Roads University, where she went on to launch a master's program centered on peace building and governance. While working in Victoria, she met and married her third and last husband, John K. Park.

== Legacy ==
In addition to her global public speaking engagements and conference appearances, Buttedahl also devoted her time to mentoring her interns and young consultants working on international development projects around the world. Her extensive research and written contributions were also noteworthy. She made a considerable impact on Royal Roads University when she, as President of the RRU Faculty Association, led the association to unionize in March 2006, and through that won a first collective agreement at the end of that month. As a testament to her remarkable career and her deep engagement in faculty association affairs, the Confederation of University Faculty Associations of British Columbia (CUFA/BC) established an award in her name - the "Paz Buttedahl Career Achievement Award in Academia", given every year at CUFA/BCs Academic of the Year recognition ceremony.
