= International Commission on Peace and Food =

Private non-governmental initiative

The International Commission on Peace and Food (ICPF) was formed in 1989 as a private non-governmental initiative to bring an end to the arms race and thereby redirect the monetary resources of the world for accelerating global economic development. In 1995 the commission ended, but its work was continued by the The International Center for Peace and Development (ICPD), which was established in 1997.

== Background ==
Though the then Soviet General Secretary Mikhail Gorbachev tried to deescalate the existing arms race between the NATO and Soviet Blocs, world military spending continued to spiral upwards and reached an all-time high of 1.2 trillion dollars in the year 1988. This sparked a wave of fear that an intentional or accidental nuclear war was likely to occur at any time. Apart from an intensification of efforts to lessen the arms race, there was another parallel movement to augment world food supplies to reduce world hunger.

Towards the end of that year The Mother's Service Society, a social science research institute based in Pondicherry, South India approached Indian Scientist M. S. Swaminathan to explore the possibility of convening a group of experts to promote the efforts to increase food supply and also at the same time intensify efforts to bring down the arms race. The Commission was formed with Swaminathan as the Chairman and included 25 leading scientists, defense and development experts and politicians. Notable among the political members were Queen Noor of Jordan and the former First Lady of the United States Rosalynn Carter. By the time the first meeting of the Commission took place at the end of September 1989, the Cold War tensions had thawed significantly, and barely six weeks later the Berlin Wall fell signaling the beginning of the end of the Cold War.

== Work of the Commission ==
The Commission was active for five years during which time it held many fact-gathering sessions. It also conducted extensive research and made many recommendations to national and international agencies. Cashing in on the growing positive climate in the world the Commission also focused its attention on possibilities to accelerate and magnify developmental efforts in the world. During the next five years it held successive meetings on these themes in such countries as Italy, Russia, India, Jordan, Norway, USA, France and Germany.

The ICPF took many efforts to dispel fears about growing unemployment. In an initiative the ICPF took the stand that it was eminently possible for the industrialized and developing countries of the world to fully absorb their labor force in productive employment. In pursuit of such a visionary scheme, the Commission drew up a plan to generate 100 million jobs over a period of ten years in India. It was aptly named "Prosperity 2000" and its recommendations were accepted and endorsed by the Indian Government in 1992. A similar effort was made to extend such a scheme to solve the problem of unemployment among the Palestinians in the Middle East.

The Commission took a special interest in the affairs of the East European countries following the disbanding of the Soviet Bloc. It enlisted the support of Mikhail Gorbachev in advocating a more gradual and less disruptive transition to market economy in these countries than the one recommended by Western governments and monetary agencies. Such efforts led to the formulation of an effective strategy to counter run-away inflation in Yugoslavia by Commission Member Dr. Dragoslav Avramovic in 1994.

== ICPF's Report to UN ==
The Commission's final report, Uncommon Opportunities: An Agenda for Peace and Equitable Development, was published in 1994 and formally presented to the UN Secretary General and member states by the Government of Jordan. The report was one of the first to view security from a wider perspective that includes political, social, economic and institutional factors required for a stable and prosperous society.

The Commission emphasized the linkage between democracy, peace and development and laid stress on the fact that the UN needs to democratize its functioning in order to fully succeed in its mission of promoting development and guaranteeing peace and security among the member states. The report called for the total elimination of nuclear weapons and other weapons of mass destruction. Also it noted the role played by the trade in small arms in aggravating terrorism and criminal behavior across the world and called for measures to control of arms trade. It was critical of the prevalent competitive security paradigm that makes the military preparedness of each nation a perceived threat to other surrounding nations. As an alternative ICPF proposed a cooperative security system that is backed by a world army which guarantees the safety and security of member countries by reducing down the aggressive capabilities of all of them.

India's success in the area of food production through the launching of The Green Revolution led the Commission to conclude that the world possesses the technological and organizational capabilities to raise food production on par with the growth in world population. Such a conviction also encouraged the Commission to call for revolutionary steps to increase food production.

ICPF also concluded that the persistence of hunger in the world was less an issue of inadequate food production and more a problem stemming from the absence of purchasing power among the poor of the world due to the lack of sufficient employment opportunities. The Commission took the stand that rising levels of unemployment are not inevitable and can be reversed by the adoption of sound strategies for job generation compatible with market-driven economics. It noted that the shrinking population in OECD countries would force these countries to adopt more liberal immigration policies and outsourcing methods in order to offset growing labor shortages in future.

Though the Commission was concerned with environmental problems arising from rampant exploitation of the earth's resources, it rejected the notion of limits to growth voiced by those who believed that the world's resources were limited. Instead it took the stand that infinite growth was possible if the mental and organizational resources available to humanity in the form of knowledge, technology, vocational skills and modes of organizations were fully utilized. ICPF noted with concern the marked absence of a body of theoretical knowledge concerning the process of development and issued a call for efforts to formulate a comprehensive theory of social evolution.

== Support ==
The financial resources for the functioning of the Commission were contributed by its own members coupled with public donations and other forms of support from such agencies as UNDP, UNESCO, Ford Foundation, The Third World Academy of Science, the Governments of USSR and Norway, The Gorbachev Foundation, The Carter Center and The Mother's Service Society.

== Follow-up ==
The International Center for Peace and Development (ICPD), headquartered in Napa, California, was formed in 1997 to continue the work of the Commission. Harlan Cleveland, former President of the World Academy of Art & Science, former US Ambassador to NATO, served as chairman from 2000 to 2008. Garry Jacobs, former Secretary of the Commission, is Executive Director. In 2000, ICPD approached the governments of India and Pakistan to explore the possibilities of widening the economic cooperation between the two countries as a means of fostering peace. The Prosperity 2000 strategy for India was updated with special emphasis on the multiplier effects and employment potential of bio-fuels. A ten-year review meeting of the Commission's work conducted in 2004 in collaboration with the World Academy of Art & Science found many of its recommendations still relevant to the present world situation.

Since then the main work of the Commission's report on nuclear disarmament, global governance, employment, social development and human resources have continued as part of the program of work of the World Academy of Art & Science

== Commission members ==
Dr. M. S. Swaminathan, Chairman of ICPF, first recipient of the World Food Prize, former Director General of the International Rice Research Institute, Agriculture Secretary to Government of India, Member of the Indian Planning Commission.

Lal Jayawardena, Director, UN World Institute of Development Economic Research; Chief Economic Adviser, President of Sri Lanka; Secretary, Ministry of Finance & Planning, Sri Lanka.

Dr. A. T. Ariyaratne, is the founder and President of the internationally reputed people centered movement for Development and Peace in Sri Lanka - The Sarvodaya Shramaana Movement.

Rosalynn Carter, Former First Lady Rosalynn Carter is the co-founder of The Carter Center in Atlanta, GA., a nonprofit, nongovernmental organization devoted to improving the quality of life worldwide through programs in democratization and development, global health and urban revitalization.

Umberto Colombo, Minister Gov't of Italy, University and Scientific Technical Research; Chairman, ENEA (Italian National Agency for Atomic and Alternative Energy Sources); Chairman, Italian Atomic Energy Commission

Erling Dessau, Resident Representative, UNDP, Myanmar, Bangladesh, India, Somalia; Deputy Resident representative, UNDP, Turkey; Deputy Director, M.I.S., Bureau of Administration, UNDP Headquarters. Board of Directors, Data for Development, France.

Garry Jacobs, Member Secretary ICPF, a US-based management consultant and Assistant Secretary of The Mother's Service Society, a social science research institute in Pondicherry, India.

Mary King (political scientist), President, Global Action, Inc., a nonprofit tax exempt organization providing research for international nonprofit and UN agencies on nonviolent peacemaking, international cooperation, and development. Former Senior U. S. government official in the Carter Administration with worldwide responsibility for the Peace Corps and similar domestic national service corps programs. Winner of a 1988 Robert F. Kennedy Memorial Book Award for her book, Freedom Song, about her experiences working in the 1960s American civil rights movement (New York: William Morrow & Co., 1987; Quill paperback, 1988).

Dr. Manfred Kulessa, Former Managing Director, German Development Service, and Director, UNDP (including postings as resident representative in Nepal and China). Presently Director, Association of the Churches Development Services, Bonn. Lecturer, University of St. Gallen.

Martin Lees, Director General of the International Committee for Economic Reform and Cooperation, established in 1993 to assist the reform process in the NIS of the Former Soviet Reunion and in Eastern and Central Europe. Responsible for a programme "China and the World in the Nineties" and a Member of the "China Council for the Cooperation on Environment and Development". Previously Assistant Secretary-General for Science and Technology at the UN after eight years at OECD.

Uma Lele, Graduate Research Professor, Food Resource & Economics Dept., Univ. of Florida. Director of the Global Development Initiative of the Carnegie Corporation and the Carter Center. Member of the Technical Advisory Committee and the Vision Committee of the Consultative Group on International Agricultural Research (CGIAR).

Robert Macfarlane, Treasurer of ICPF, a management consultant based in Napa, California and Treasurer of The Mother's Service Society, a social science research institute in Pondicherry, India.

John Mellor, President, JMA, Inc.; Director, IFPRI; Chief Economist, United States Agency for International Development.

V. Nazarenko, Director, Research Institute of Information and Technical-Economic Studies of Agro-Industrial Complex, Russia. Member of AScademic of Agriculture, Economics and Informational Sciences.

Alexander Niconov, Director of the Agrarian Institute; President of the Lenin All-Union Academy of Agricultural Sciences (VASKHNIL);Director of Stavropol Agricultural Institute; Minister of Agriculture of Latvia.

Abdus Salam, Former Director of the International Centre for Theoretical Physics (1964–1993). President of ICTP (1994 to present). President of the Third World Academy of Sciences (1983 to present). President of the Third World Network of Scientific Organizations (1988 to Present).

Jasjit Singh, Director, IDSA, Retired from the Indian Air Force after a distinguished career, last post held was Director of Operations at Air Headquarters. Was Deputy Director, IDSA for two years and took over as Director, IDSA from July 31, 1987. A distinguished analyst on security affairs. Has authored and edited numerous books and articles on strategic issues. Appointed Member of National Security Advisory Board in 1990. Member of the "International Commission for a New Asia".

Robert van Harten, President, Mira International, Netherlands and Senior Research Fellow, The Mother's Service Society, India.

Brian Walker (ecologist), Executive Director, Earthwatch Europe, Emeritus Director General of OXFAM and formerly President of the International Institute for Environment and Development.

Eugene Whelan, Member of Canadian Parliament 22 years. Minister of Agriculture for Canada for 12 years. Former president of the World Food Council and was a Member from its inception. Currently Presideht of A.I.D.A.C. (Agricultural International Development Associates of Canada) Inc., a privately owned consulting firm.

Ted Williams, Executive Director, Kilby Awards Foundation; Senior Associate, Winrock International; Former Administrator, The World Food Prize.
