= The Mother's Service Society =

Indian research institute

The Mother's Service Society is a non-governmental, educational and social science research institute established at Pondicherry, India in 1970. MSS conducts research on a wide range of activities related to social and economic development, social science research, education and public policy formulation. The Society’s current research activities focus on social development theory, economics, employment, business management, agricultural development, alternative education, global governance, peace & security, literary criticism, psychology and applied spirituality based on a conceptual framework derived from theory of creation and evolution of consciousness propounded by Indian philosopher Sri Aurobindo. MSS is recognized as a Center of Excellence of the World Academy of Art & Science.

As of 2015 the society had the following operating divisions:

- MSS Research social science research institute
- Primrose School for primary & secondary education
- Mother Estates organic farming and agricultural development project
- Karmayogi.net for spirituality and personal accomplishment

== MSS Research ==
MSS is recognized by the Government of India as an S.35(1)(iii) social science research institute. The Society conducts research applying Sri Aurobindo’s thought to social evolution, human development, economics, education, management, psychology, science and literature.

=== Development theory ===
Since its foundation, MSS has conducted research on the process of social development in an effort to develop the broad outlines and fundamental principles of a comprehensive theory applicable to all fields of human activity and all levels from the individual and organization to the national and global community. The research includes theoretical statements of the process of development and discussion of 32 major principles and 1000 corollary observations, as well as applications of the theory. In the late 1990s, the World Academy of Art & Science conducted several international conferences to examine the premises of the theory and published the Society's findings as an Academy publication. The theory accords central importance to the interdependence between development of social capital and human capital and the interaction between the individual and the collective. The central role of the Individual in social development was examined at several conferences of the World Academy of Art & Science and in several published articles co-authored by MSS researchers.

=== Economics ===
MSS is engaged in theoretical and practical studies on a wide range of economic issues, with emphasis on employment and money. In 2009, the Society began a collaborative research project with a small international group under the title New Economic Theory.

=== Education ===
The Society conducts both theoretical and applied research in the field of education. It has pioneered the development, testing and application of advanced methods for early childhood education at Primrose School in Pondicherry. The school integrates methods developed by the American educator Glenn Doman at the Institutes for the Achievement of Human Potential in Philadelphia with the latest technology for active learning, freedom for each individual pursuits and efforts to awaken curiosity and independent thinking in the student.

In 2013 MSS partnered with the World Academy of Art & Science, International Association of University Presidents, Library of Alexandria (Egypt), Green Cross International, Inter-University Centre (Dubrovnik), Person Centered Approach Institute (Italy), Institute for Cultural Diplomacy (Germany) and Foundation for Culture of Peace (Spain) to found the *World University Consortium (WUC). *The objective of WUC is to act as a catalyst for rapid development of a world-class system of higher education accessible and affordability to people everywhere. MSS conducts research in collaboration with the Consortium and the Academy on latest developments in the field of global higher education published on the WUC website.

=== Employment ===
MSS has conducted a wide range of studies on the process of employment generation and strategies to achieve full employment. In 1991 the Society presented a report to the Government of India on strategies to generate 100 million jobs in India within 10 years. The report was adopted as official policy of the Government of India in 1992. MSS staff headed a working group of the International Commission on Peace & Food in the early 1990s and authored the chapter of the Commission’s report on strategies for full employment. Over the past decade, the society has conducted numerous studies and programs in collaboration with the World Academy on strategies for global full employment.

=== Business management ===
MSS has developed a theory of organizational development and business growth and has applied it in studies and consulting assignments involving major corporations in the USA, Europe and India as well as numerous international conferences and training programs. Six management books have been published in the USA based on MSS’s model, including The Vital Corporation: Unleashing the Powers of Sustained Corporate Success by Frederick Harmon and Garry Jacobs (AMACOM, USA, 1985) and The Vital Difference: How American Companies Large and Small Double Profits in Two Years or Less by Garry Jacobs and Robert Macfarlane (Prentice Hall, USA, 1989). In 2010, MSS developed a web-based personal training program on the psychology of accomplishment.

== Primrose School ==
MSS operates a primary and secondary school in Pondicherry applying advanced methods of early childhood and computer-aided education based on methods for early childhood education developed by Dr. Glenn Doman at The Institutes for the Achievement of Human Potential, Philadelphia.

== The International Commission on Peace and Food ==
The International Commission on Peace and Food was established as an initiative of the MSS in 1989 and included several representatives of MSS among its members. The Commission focused on evolving solutions to pressing global issues related to international security, global governance, employment, food security, transition in Eastern Europe and human development. The International Center for Peace and Development was established as a non-profit, non-governmental organization in 1997 to continue the work initiated by the Commission. The Society collaborates with the center on research in the fields of development, education, employment, peace and security and works in collaboration with other organizations to promote activities that will advance progress toward world peace and prosperity.

== World Academy of Art & Science ==
Since 1998, The Society has been collaborating with the World Academy of Art & Science on a continuous series of international conferences and research projects on issues related to development theory, peace and global security, employment and the future of science, education, global governance and related issues. Five representatives of the Society have been elected fellows of the Academy. Garry Jacobs, President of MSS, is also the current President and CEO of WAAS. In May 2020, MSS was recognized by WAAS as a Center of Excellence of the World Academy of Art & Science.

== Karmayogi.net ==
The Society publishes a wide range of books and articles on personal accomplishment, psychological growth and spirituality in life and other topics in English and Tamil. It also publishes a monthly Tamil journal Malarndha Jeeviyam on spirituality and prosperity. For access to the complete collection of books and back issues of the journal see Karmayogi.net.

== Publications ==
The Society publishes Cadmus, an English journal addressing issues of global concern, in collaboration with Fellows of the World Academy of Art & Science, and Malarndha Jeeviyam a monthly journal on spirituality in Tamil.
