= Gary J. Shapiro =

American lawyer, writer and businessman

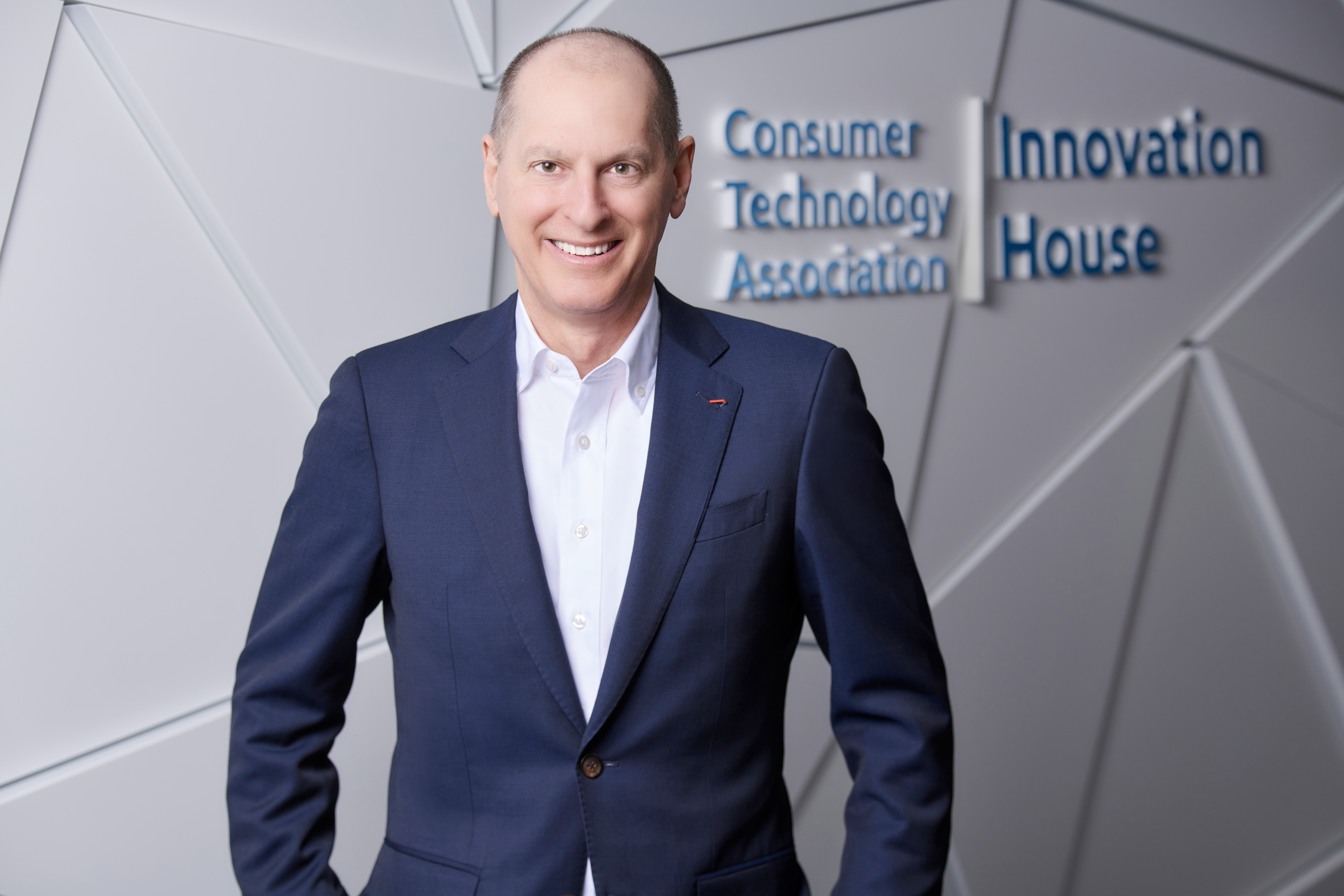
- Born: August 28, 1956 (age 70)
- Occupations: Business executive, author
- Title: CEO and Vice Chair of the Consumer Technology Association

Gary J. Shapiro is an American author and lobbyist who is the Executive Chair and CEO of the Consumer Technology Association (CTA)^{®}. Shapiro is the author of the books Pivot or Die, How Leaders Thrive When Everything Changes, Ninja Future: Secrets to Success in the New World of Innovation (2019), Ninja Innovation: The Ten Killer Strategies of the World’s Most Successful Businesses (William Morrow, 2013), and The Comeback: How Innovation Will Restore the American Dream (2011). Through these books, interviews, and opinion pieces, Shapiro explains the economic importance of innovation. He has spoken at DLD, Milken, The Next Web, and SXSW.

== Career ==
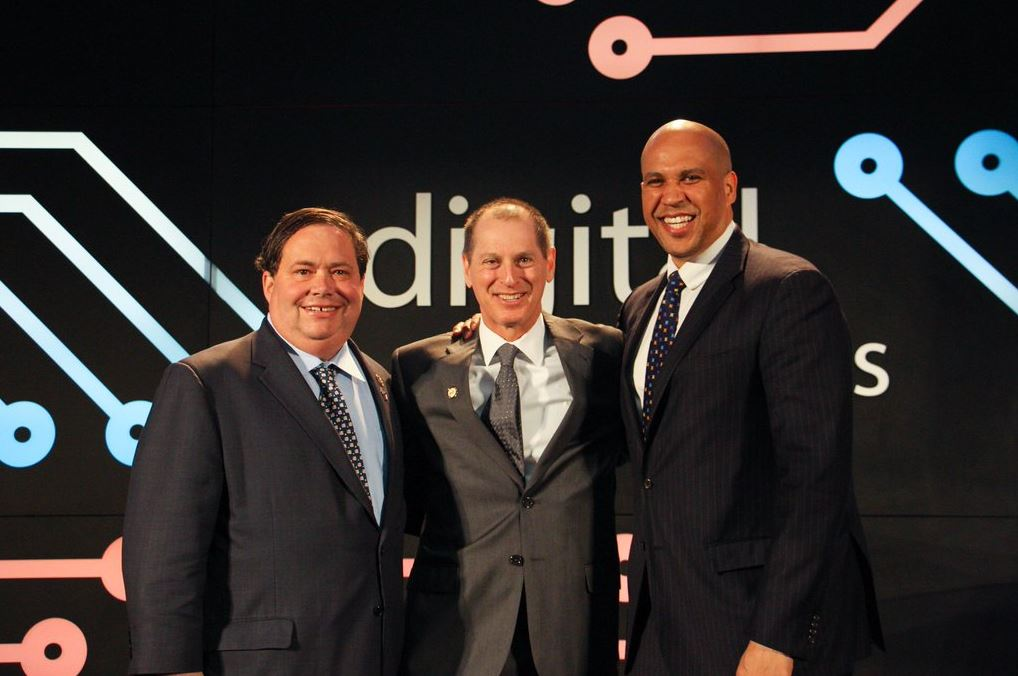
Shapiro with Cory Booker and Blake Farenthold, in Washington, D.C.

Shapiro was an associate at the law firm of Squire, Sanders and Dempsey. He also worked as a legislative aide on Capitol Hill.

He co-founded and chaired the HDTV Model Station, served as a leader of the Advanced Television Test Center (ATTC) and is a charter inductee to the Academy of Digital Television Pioneers, receiving its highest award as the industry leader most influential in advancing HDTV.

Shapiro served as chairman of the Home Recording Rights Coalition.

While Shapiro was at Georgetown, J. Edward Day, a senior partner at Squire, began to mentor Shapiro. He instructed Shapiro to begin monitoring developments in the Sony case. The case was filed to prevent Sony and retailers from making and selling video cassette recorders. The decision by the Ninth Circuit against Sony spurred a group of retailers, consumer groups and manufacturers, such as 3M, General Electric and RCA, to start weekly meetings in order to coordinate their fight against the verdict. These meetings quickly resulted in the creation of the HRRC. As chairman of the coalition, Shapiro has testified before Congress and has helped ensure the growth of the video rental market, VCRs, home computers, and audio-recording equipment, including MP3 technology.

== Awards and recognition ==
In February 2025, the Royal Order of Francis I officially knighted Shapiro through Investiture. In 2021, Shapiro received the Légion d'Honneur (Legion of Honor) at the Rank of Chevalier by President Emmanuel Macron, recognizing his service in spearheading the transition to a technology-forward society and organizing CES. Shapiro testified on a Senate Commerce, Science & Transportation Committee hearing on the risks to innovation caused by over-regulation. He was named a "Tech Titan" by Washingtonian magazine in 2018, 2019, 2021, 2023, and 2024. Every year since 2015, The Hill has named Shapiro “one of the most influential lobbyists” in Washington, D.C. In 2015, Shapiro was named one of DC Inno's 50 on Fire of DC Government and Advocacy. Shapiro was inducted into the Academy of Digital Television Pioneers and in 2003 received its highest award as the industry leader most influential in advancing HDTV. In 2004, the Anti-Defamation League honored Shapiro with its American Heritage Award at its annual dinner in recognition of his "long commitment to the humanitarian goals of civil rights and justice."

Shapiro sits on the boards of the Northern Virginia Technology Council, the Focused Ultrasound Foundation, and the CEO Forum Digital Board. Shapiro sat on the State Department's Advisory Committee on International Communications and Information Policy, the No Labels Executive Council, the USO of Metropolitan Washington-Baltimore Board of Directors and the American Enterprise Institute Global Internet Strategy Advisory Board. He served on the Economic Club of Washington, and the Commonwealth of Virginia's Commission on Information Technology.

== Family ==
Shapiro divorced and later remarried. He has two sons with his second wife, Susan Malinowski, and two sons from a previous marriage.

== Books ==
- The Comeback: How Innovation Will Restore the American Dream (2011)
- Ninja Innovation: The Ten Killer Strategies of the World’s Most Successful Businesses (HarperCollins, 2013) ISBN 978-0-06-224232-7
- Ninja Future: Secrets to Success in the New World of Innovation (2019)
- Pivot or Die: How Leaders Thrive When Everything Changes (2024)
