= Yehuda Kahane =

- יהודה כהנא
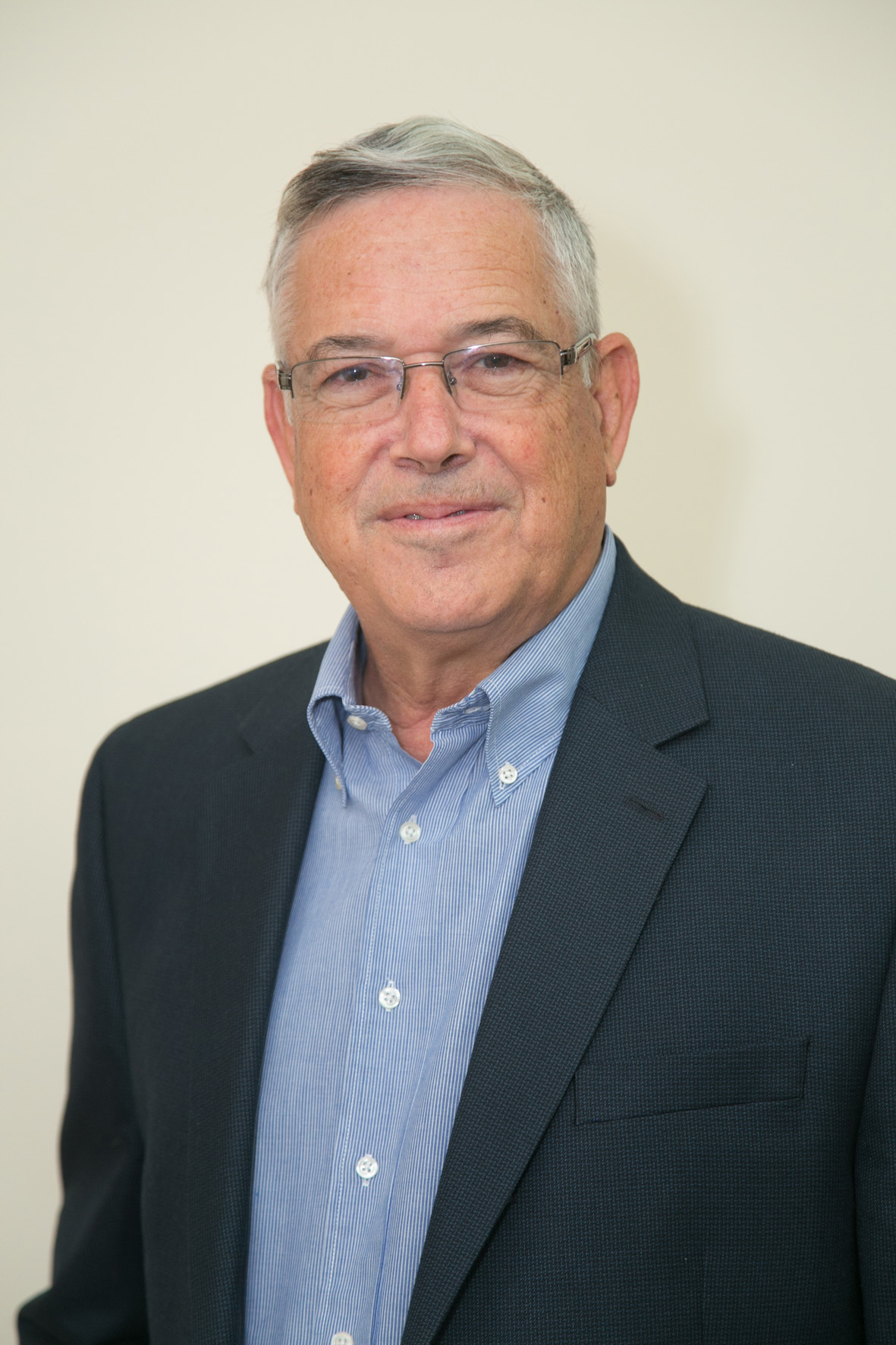
- Kahane in 2014
- Born: August 4, 1944 (age 82)
- Citizenship: Israel

Academic background
- Education: Hebrew University of Jerusalem

Academic work
- Discipline: Insurance and finance
- Institutions: Faculty of Management, Tel-Aviv University; Akirov Institute for Business and Environment

Yehuda Kahane (Hebrew: יהודה כהנא; born August 4, 1944) is an Israeli businessman and academic, and the 2011 recipient of the John S. Bickley Founder's Award for his contribution to the theory, practice, and education of insurance and risk management. Kahane is active in both the academic and business areas. In 2015, he won an Annual Better World Award for sustainability.

He is a professor of insurance and finance, Faculty of Management, and Head of the Akirov Institute for Business and the Environment, Tel-Aviv University. He founded and served as dean of the first academic school of insurance in Israel (now a part of Netanya Academic College). At Tel Aviv University he directed the Erhard Insurance Center, the actuarial studies program, and coordinated the Executives Development Programs. He is a life and non-life actuary.
