= Gloria Feldt =

American author and public speaker

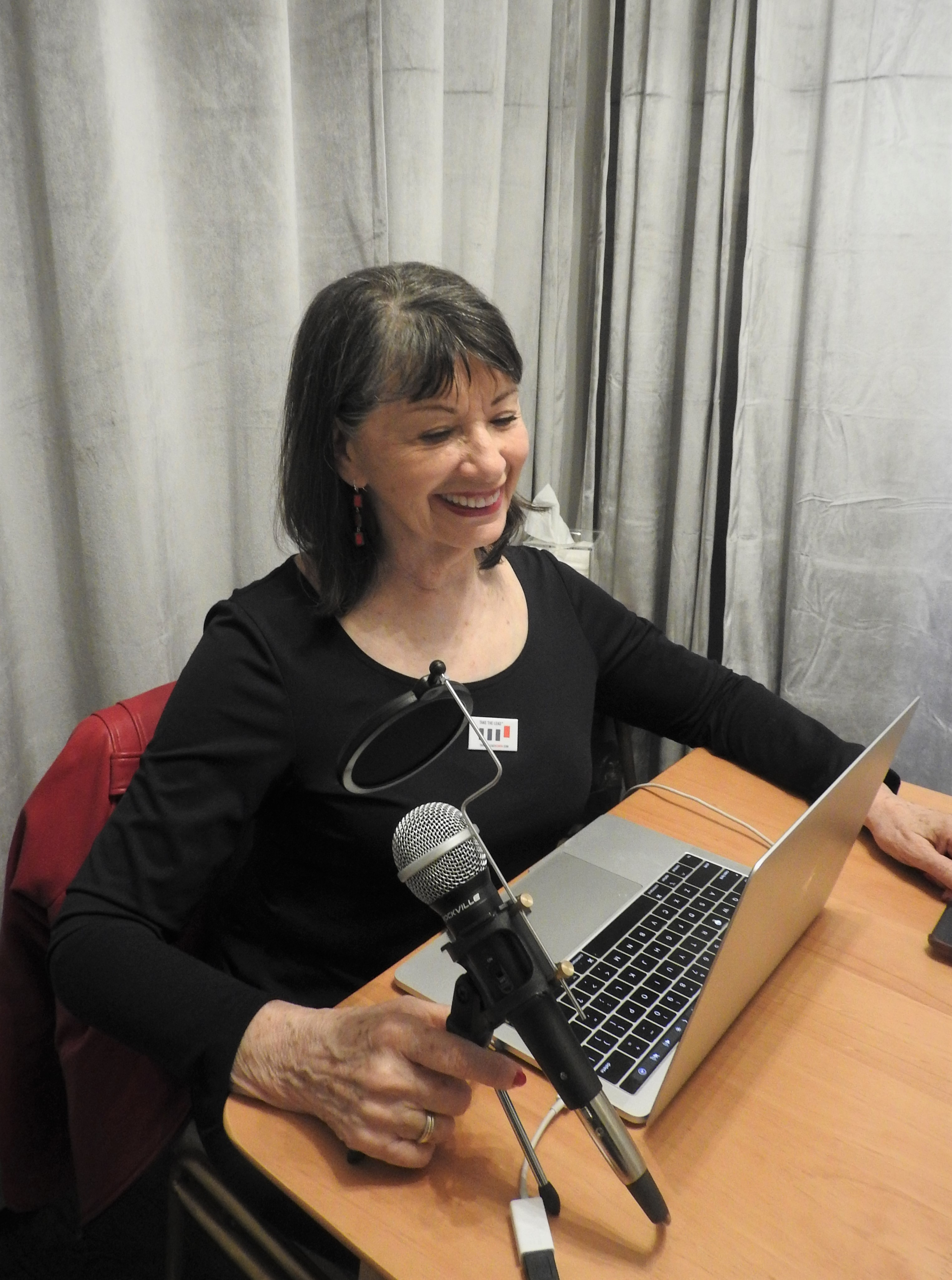
- Feldt at her podcast station

President of Planned Parenthood
- In office 1996–2005
- Preceded by: Faye Wattleton
- Succeeded by: Cecile Richards

Personal details
- Born: April 13, 1942 (age 84) Temple, Texas, U.S.
- Education: University of Texas Permian Basin (BA)
- Occupation: Co-founder and president of Take The Lead, feminist, writer, author, speaker
- Awards: Vanity Fair, America's Top 200 Women Leaders
- Website: Official website
- Writing career
- Genre: Nonfiction
- Subjects: Leadership, power, women's rights
- Notable work: No Excuses: 9 Ways Women Can Change How We Think About Power

Gloria Feldt (born April 13, 1942) is an American author, speaker, commentator, and feminist activist who gained recognition as a social and political advocate of women's rights. In 2013, she and Amy Litzenberger founded Take the Lead, a nonprofit initiative with a goal to propel women to leadership parity by 2025. She is a former CEO and president of Planned Parenthood Federation of America, directing the organization from 1996 to 2005.

== Early life and career ==
Gloria Feldt was born on April 13, 1942 to a Jewish family, in Temple, Texas. She earned her Bachelor of Arts degree in 1974 from the University of Texas Permian Basin.

Feldt joined Planned Parenthood in 1974 at the Permian Basin Planned Parenthood office (now Planned Parenthood of West Texas). Beginning in 1978, she headed the organization's Central Northern Arizona office. "Her superlative compassion and conviction," according to Women in the World Foundation, "combined with her intelligence and charisma, have carried her from teenage motherhood in West Texas to a thirty-year career with the reproductive health provider and advocacy group Planned Parenthood Federation of America." Feldt ran the Central Northern Arizona Planned Parenthood office during a time when family planning was becoming increasingly controversial and politically charged. During this time, she travelled with a bodyguard and avoided working in well-lit, open offices with large windows which could be targeted by protestors.

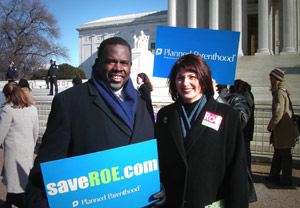
Feldt with Albert Wynn on steps of U.S. Supreme Court at a rally for abortion rights on the anniversary of Roe v. Wade

From 1996 to 2005, Feldt was CEO and president of Planned Parenthood Federation of America. She was the architect of contraceptive coverage by insurance.

She was active early in her career in the civil rights movement. Feldt often comments on women's issues, including in a June 2012 Salon online magazine article. MSNBC interviewed her for a piece about the war on women that aired March 19, 2012. The New York Times' Adriana Gardella did a Q&A with Feldt in 2010, featuring her in the newspaper's business section.

As president of Take The Lead, Feldt oversees learning programs, mentoring, networking, and role modelling programs for women. She is a professor at Arizona State University, where she teaches the course Women, Power, and Leadership. She also serves on the boards of the Women's Media Center and the Jewish Women's Archive and on the advisory board of Our Bodies, Ourselves.

== Appearances ==
Feldt is a frequent public speaker, lecturing at universities, civic and professional organizations, as well as national and international conferences on women's rights, politics, leadership, media, and health. In October 2011, she sat on a panel, moderated by attorney mediator Victoria Pynchon, with feminist leaders Gloria Steinem, Shelby Knox and Jamia Wilson at the South Carolina Women Lawyers Association annual conference She has also appeared in several forums on C-SPAN's Book TV.

In addition to speaking engagements, she tours with an intergenerational feminist panel titled WomenGirlsLadies.

== Writing ==
Feldt's commentary has appeared in The New York Times, USA Today, The Wall Street Journal, and The Washington Post, among other publications. She has contributed also to Truthout, The Daily Beast, Salon.com, ForbesWoman, Democracy Journal, Women's eNews, The Huffington Post, WIMN's Voices, the Women's Media Center, the International Leadership Forum's ilfpost, BlogHer, and on her personal website.

Feldt has written several books. Her latest, No Excuses: 9 Ways Women Can Change How We Think About Power, was published by Seal Press in October 2010.

=== Works ===
- Behind Every Choice is a Story (University of North Texas Press, 2003) ISBN 978-1-57441-158-4
- The War on Choice: The Right-Wing Attack on Women's Rights and How to Fight Back (Bantam Dell, 2004) ISBN 978-0-553-38292-1
- Send Yourself Roses: Thoughts on My Life, Love, and Leading Roles (Springboard, 2008), co-authored with actress Kathleen Turner and a New York Times best seller. ISBN 978-0-446-58112-7
- No Excuses: 9 Ways Women Can Change How We Think About Power (Seal Press, 2010) ISBN 978-1-58005-328-0

== Awards and recognition ==
- American Humanist Association, Humanist Distinguished Service Award, 2003
- New York Newswomen Front Page Award, 2007
- Women's eNews, 21 Leaders for the 21st Century, 2007
- Women Lawyers Los Angeles, Courage Award, 2005
- Arizona Civil Liberties Union, Civil Libertarian of the Year, 2005
- Planned Parenthood Golden Gate Sarah Weddington Award, 2005
- Planned Parenthood Federation of America, Margaret Sanger Award, 2005
- Glamour Magazine, Woman of the Year, 2003
- Vanity Fair magazine, America's Top 200 Women Leaders, Legends and Trailblazers, 1998
- World Academy of Art and Science, Special Award, 1998
- Texas Monthly Texas Twenty 1996
- City of Phoenix Human Relations Commission, Martin Luther King Jr. Living the Dream Award, 1996
- National Organization for Women, Sun City Chapter, Golden Apple Award, 1995
- Soroptimist International, Women Helping Women Award, 1994 and 1998
- Planned Parenthood National Executive Directors Council Ruth Green Award, 1990
- Woman of Achievement, 1987, Junior League, Mujer, and AAUW
- New Times, Best of Phoenix, 1987

== Personal life ==
At age 15, Feldt married her college-age boyfriend and had three children by the time she was 20. She currently lives with her husband Alex Barbanell and splits her time between New York City and Scottsdale, Arizona.
