= Ivo Šlaus =

Croatian scientist and politician (1931–2026)

Ivo Šlaus (26 September 1931 – 8 August 2026) was a Croatian nuclear and particle physicist and Distinguished Fellow of New Westminster College.

== Life and career ==
Ivo Šlaus was born in Split on 26 September 1931. He earned a B.Sc. in Physics in 1954 from the Faculty of Science, University of Zagreb and a Ph.D. in physics in 1958 also from the University of Zagreb, Croatia. He was a professor of Physics since 1967 and held teaching posts at the Ruđer Bošković Institute, as well as several international universities including the University of California at Los Angeles (UCLA), Duke University, Georgetown University, Kyoto University and the Jožef Stefan International Graduate School in Ljubljana, Slovenia. Šlaus received national awards for research in 1962 and in 1969.

Šlaus was honorary president of the World Academy of Art and Science, dean of Dag Hammarskjold University College of International Relations (Zagreb) and a former president of WAAS. He was also a member of the international advisory council of the Club of Rome and a former president of the Croatian Association of the Club of Rome. His many scientific and diplomatic roles include: founding fellow of Academia Europaea; member of the Pugwash Council and former president of Croatian Pugwash; member of the managing board of the Balkan Political Club; chairman of the International Network of Centers for Sustainable Development; founder and former Executive Committee member of the European Physical Society; and a fellow of the World Innovation Foundation. As a member of the Croatian parliament (2000–2003), he served on the board of the Committee for Education, Science and Culture, and in the role of the Chairman of the Subcommittee on Science, Technology and Higher Education. He was a Senior Network Member at the European Leadership Network (ELN).

Šlaus died on 8 August 2026, at the age of 94.

== Work ==
Šlaus had a distinguished record of ethical leadership. His professional leadership experience and memberships included:

- from 2013: Honorary President, World Academy of Art and Science
- from 2012: Vice President, Council of the Inter-University Centre Dubrovnik (formerly served as Acting President)
- 2011–2013: President, World Academy of Art and Science
- from 2010: Dean, Dag Hammarskjold University College of International Relations and Diplomacy
- from 2006: Corresponding Member, Montenegrin and Macedonia Academies of Sciences and Arts
- from 2005: Chairman and Director of the Southeast European Division, World Academy of Art and Science
- from 2005: Professor Emeritus of Physics, Dag Hammarskjold University College of International Relations and Diplomacy
- from 2003: Member, World Innovation Foundation
- from 2002: Member, Croatian Pugwash Council
- from 2000: Chairman, International Network of Centres for Sustainable Development
- from 1991: Member, Board of Directors, Black Sea University
- from 1989: Founder and first President, Croatian Association of The Club of Rome
- from 1989: Member, The Club of Rome
- from 1988: Founding Member, Academia Europaea
- from 1969: Founder and Executive Committee Member, European Physical Society

Šlaus’ other related professional leadership experiences and memberships include:

- 1997–2007: President, Croatian Pugwash Council
- 1995–2007: Deputy Director General, Inter-University Centre Dubrovnik
- 2000–2004: Chairman, Board of Trustees, Rudjer Boskovic Institute
- 2000–2004: Member, Croatian UNESCO National Committee
- 1992–1996: Member, Croatian UNESCO National Committee
- 1990–1994: Chairman, Physics Section, Academia Europaea
- 1969–1973: Member, Council for Culture, Education, Science and Health, City of Zagreb, Croatia

Šlaus' specializations included nuclear and particle physics, medical physics (radiopharmaceuticals, radiotherapy), science policy, scientometrics, and the establishment of international centres of research. He served as a senior scientist at several institutions around the world, including:

- 2006–2007: NCCU
- 1992–1999: Brookhaven National Lab
- 1981–1993: Los Alamos National Lab
- 1981–1991: TRIUMF, Vancouver, British Columbia, Canada
- 1982–1985: Naval Research Lab, Washington, D.C.

Šlaus' academic fellowships include:

- from 2013: Distinguished Fellow, New Westminster College
- from 1994: Fellow, World Academy of Art and Science
- from 1991: Fellow, Croatian Academy of Sciences and Arts
- from 1996: Fellow, Institute of Physics, UK
- from 1985: Fellow, American Physical Society

Šlaus' publications included 361 papers in refereed journals, 147 communications to scientific meetings, and two volumes; he was also editor and co-editor of seven proceedings of international conferences.

In 2010 Šlaus constituted a small working group to evaluate the need for New Economic Theory and has published two recent papers based on that work.

Šlaus was a supporter of the Campaign for the Establishment of a United Nations Parliamentary Assembly, an organisation which campaigns for democratic reform in the United Nations, and the creation of a more accountable international political system.

Šlaus' later papers on security and governance, nuclear disarmament, individuality, human capital, global higher education, and the new paradigm of human development can be found in Cadmus.

Academic offices
Preceded by Walter Truett Anderson	President of the World Academy of Art and Science; 2005–2013	Succeeded by Heitor Gurgulino de Souza
