= Harlan Cleveland =

American professor and diplomat (1918–2008)

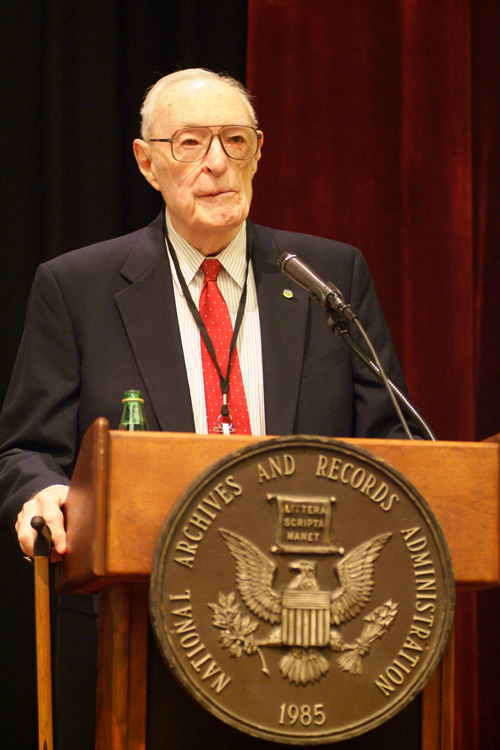
- Harlan Cleveland in DC, 2006

6th United States Permanent Representative to NATO
- In office September 1, 1965 – June 11, 1969
- President: Lyndon B. Johnson; Richard Nixon
- Preceded by: Thomas K. Finletter
- Succeeded by: Robert Ellsworth

6th Assistant Secretary of State for International Organization Affairs
- In office February 23, 1961 – September 18, 1965
- President: John F. Kennedy; Lyndon B. Johnson
- Preceded by: Francis O. Wilcox
- Succeeded by: Joseph J. Sisco

Personal details
- Born: January 19, 1918 New York City, New York, U.S.
- Died: May 30, 2008 (aged 90) Sterling, Virginia, U.S.
- Party: Democratic
- Spouse: Lois Burton
- Children: Melantha Cleveland, Alan Celeveland, Zoe Cleveland

Harlan Cleveland (January 19, 1918 – May 30, 2008) was an American diplomat, educator, and author. He served as Lyndon B. Johnson's U.S. Ambassador to NATO from 1965 to 1969, and earlier as U.S. Assistant Secretary of State for International Organization Affairs from 1961 to 1965. He was president of the University of Hawaii from 1969 to 1974, president of the World Academy of Art and Science in the 1990s, and Founding dean of the University of Minnesota's Hubert H. Humphrey Institute of Public Affairs. Cleveland also served as dean of the Maxwell School of Citizenship and Public Affairs at Syracuse University from 1956 to 1961.

== Early life and education ==
He was born on January 19, 1918, in New York City, to Stanley Matthews Cleveland (grandson of Stanley Matthews) and Marian Van Buren. His siblings were Harold van Buren Cleveland (who became an economist), Anne Cleveland White (who became an artist), and Stanley Cleveland (who became a diplomat). Cleveland's father died when he was eight years old, after which the family moved to Geneva, Switzerland, where he attended school and learned French. Upon returning to the states, Cleveland attended Phillips Andover Academy from 1931 to 1934, and graduated from Princeton University in 1938. He was a Rhodes Scholar at Oxford University in 1938 and 1939, where one of his teachers was Harold Wilson. When World War II broke out, Cleveland returned to the States.

== Career ==
Cleveland's career included periods of service as an American diplomat and as an educator, as well as significant productivity as a writer and book author.

During World War II, Cleveland served as an official with the Foreign Economic Administration, the Allied Control Commission for Italy, and the United Nations Relief and Rehabilitation Administration (UNRRA) in both Italy and China. In 1948, he joined the Economic Cooperation Administration (ECA), where he served as Director of the China Aid Program and later managed U.S. aid to eight East Asian countries. He subsequently became Assistant Director for Europe of the Mutual Security Agency, serving as the Washington-based supervisor of the Marshall Plan in its fourth year in 1952.

In 1953, he became executive director and later publisher of The Reporter.

He served as dean of the Maxwell School of Citizenship and Public Affairs at Syracuse University from 1956 to 1961. He was appointed the U.S. Assistant Secretary of State for International Organization Affairs under Presidents John F. Kennedy and Lyndon B. Johnson from 1961 to 1965, and then as President Johnson's U.S. Ambassador to NATO from 1965 to 1969.

Cleveland went on to serve as president of the University of Hawaii from 1969 to 1974, a period that saw university's addition of an international astronomy project, a law school, and a medical school.

Cleveland was an early advocate and practitioner of online education, teaching courses for the Western Behavioral Sciences Institute (WBSI), and Connected Education in the 1980s and early 1990s. and he was elected president of the World Academy of Art and Science in the 1990s.

Cleveland was and the founding dean of the University of Minnesota's Hubert H. Humphrey Institute of Public Affairs.

Cleveland is credited with coining the term coalition of the willing.

=== International Commission on Peace & Food ===
Cleveland participated in the final meeting of the International Commission on Peace & Food (ICPF) at the Carter Presidential Center in October 1993, and released ICPF's report to the UN entitled, "Uncommon Opportunities: Agenda for Peace & Equitable Development" at the Minneapolis General Assembly in October 1994. He then served as chair of the commission's successor organization, the "International Center for Peace and Development" (ICPD) in California, for the remainder of his active years.

Cleveland represented both the ICPD and World Academy of Art & Science (WAAS) at the 10th anniversary conference of ICPF in Delhi in October 2004.

== Writing ==
Cleveland authored twelve books, among his best-known are The Knowledge Executive (1985) and Nobody in Charge: Essays on the Future of Leadership (2002). He also published hundreds of journal and magazine articles, including the final chapter of ‘’The Bretton Woods-GATT System Retrospect and Prospect After Fifty Years’’ (1996). Cleveland's final published work was the opening chapter for "Creating a Learning Culture: Strategy, Technology, and Practice" (2004) entitled, "Leading and learning with nobody in charge."

== Awards and recognition ==
Cleveland was elected as a Fellow of the World Academy of Art & Science (WAAS), and as a member of the Club of Rome during the 1980s. He was the co-winner (with Bertrand de Jouvenel) of the 1981 Prix de Talloires, a Swiss award that heralded him as an "accomplished generalist."

Cleveland was the recipient of the U.S. Presidential Medal of Freedom, Princeton University's Woodrow Wilson Award in 1968, the Peace Corps' Leader for Peace Award, and the American Whig-Cliosophic Society's James Madison Award for Distinguished Public Service in 1965.

He was named as trustee of the Chaordic Commons in the early 2000s, and was the recipient of 22 honorary degrees.

== Personal life ==
A childhood accident left Cleveland blind in one eye, disqualifying him from military service.

Cleveland served actively in the World Academy of Art & Science (WAAS) and the Club of Rome for more than a quarter century.

Cleveland was married with three children. He died at the age of 90 on May 30, 2008, in Sterling, Virginia outside of Washington, D.C.

== See also ==
- Connected Education
- DIKW
- East-West Center
- International Leadership Forum
- List of futurologists
- Narrative inquiry

Government offices
Preceded by Francis O. Wilcox	Assistant Secretary of State for International Organization Affairs; February 23, 1961 – September 18, 1965	Succeeded by Joseph J. Sisco
