= Consumer Technology Association =

Standards and trade organization

Consumer Technology Association (CTA)

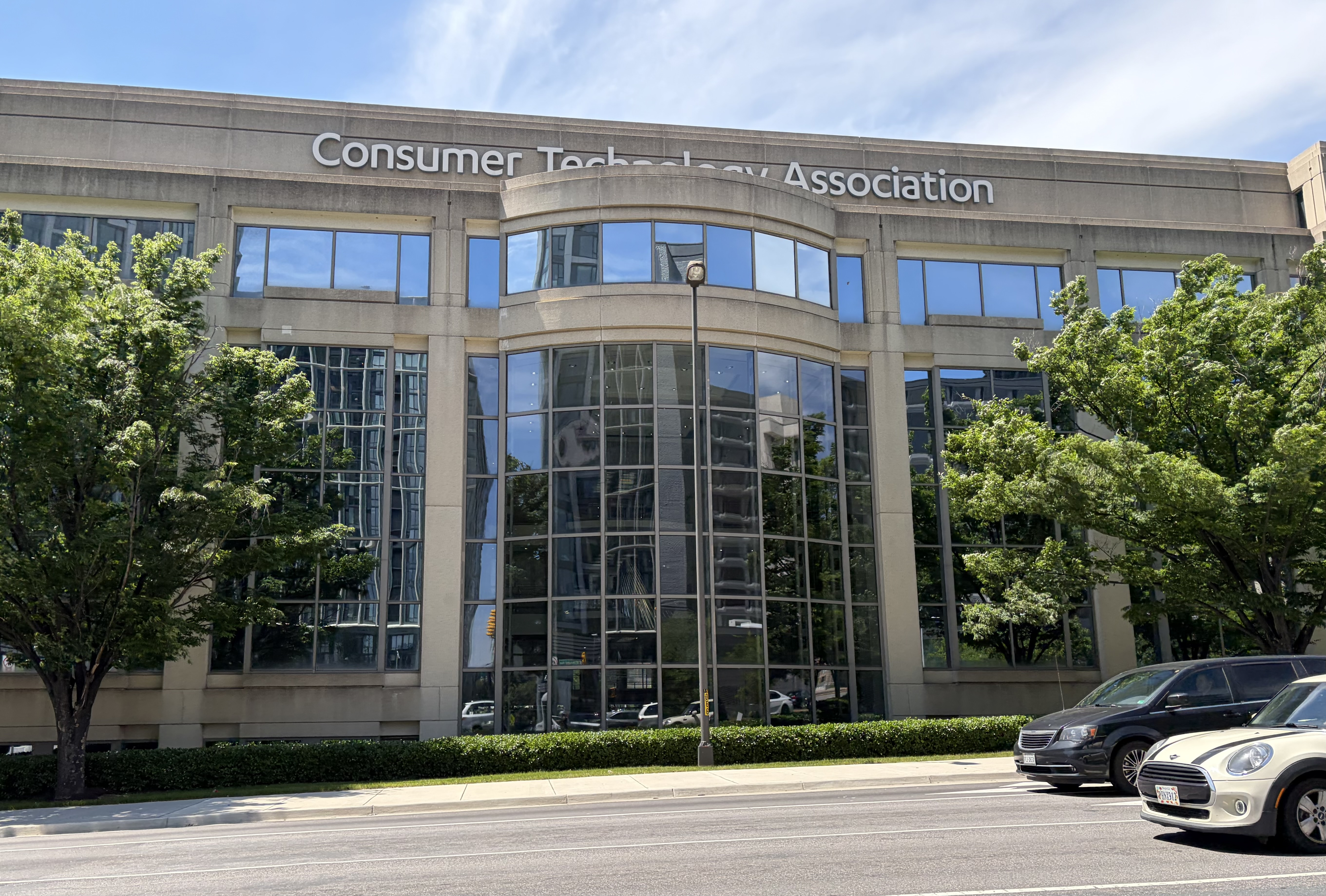
- CTA headquarters in Crystal City, Arlington, Virginia
- Formerly: Consumer Electronics Association (1999–2015)
- Type: Trade organization
- Predecessor: Consumer Electronics Association
- Founded: April 16, 1924; 102 years ago (as Radio Manufacturers Association); 1999 (as Consumer Electronics Association); 2015 (as Consumer Technology Association); U.S.
- Headquarters: 1919 S. Eads St., Crystal City, Virginia, U.S.
- Area served: Worldwide
- Key people: Kinsey Fabrizio (President & CEO); Gary J. Shapiro (Executive Chair)
- Revenue: 81,449,941 United States dollar (2022)
- Total assets: 331,555,219 United States dollar (2022)
- Number of employees: 150
- Website: www.cta.tech

The Consumer Technology Association (CTA) is North America's largest standards and technology trade organization representing more than 1,200 technology companies. CTA is led by CEO Kinsey Fabrizio.

== Trade shows ==
=== CES ===
CES is a major technology trade show held each January in Las Vegas.

The first CES was held in 1967 in New York City. It was a spin-off from the Chicago Music Show, which until then had served as the main event for exhibiting consumer electronics. The event had 17,500 attendees and over 100 exhibitors. From 1978 to 1994, CES was held twice each year: once in January in Las Vegas, known as Winter Consumer Electronics Show (WCES), and once in June in Chicago, known as Summer Consumer Electronics Show. In 1998, the show changed to an annual format with Las Vegas as the location. CES is one of the largest and longest-running trade shows held in Las Vegas, taking up to 17 days to set up, run, and break down.

== Awards programs ==
CTA has several awards programs for industry leaders, inventors, products, and technologies.

Since 1976, the Innovations Design and Engineering Awards has given consumer technology manufacturers and developers an opportunity to have their newest products judged by a panel of designers, engineers and members of the trade press.

== Lobbying ==
CTA is a registered federal lobbyist and one of the largest trade-association spenders on technology policy in the United States. According to the Center for Responsive Politics (OpenSecrets), CTA reported $4,980,000 in federal lobbying expenditures in 2024 and $3,920,000 in 2023, with 24 of its 32 registered lobbyists in 2024 having previously held government positions. The bill CTA most frequently lobbied on in the 118th Congress was H.R. 3413, the AM Radio for Every Vehicle Act, with 12 reports filed; other heavily-lobbied bills included the American Privacy Rights Act of 2024 (8 reports) and the REPAIR Act (H.R. 906; 7 reports), an automotive right-to-repair measure. Each January, CTA sponsors travel by U.S. House staffers and members to its annual Consumer Electronics Show in Las Vegas, an arrangement permitted under a narrow exception in the Honest Leadership and Open Government Act of 2007 for trade-association programming. An investigation by the Howard Center for Investigative Journalism at the University of Maryland found that CTA was the largest single sponsor of House travel to CES, paying for approximately 400 staffer trips and 34 trips by members of Congress between 2012 and 2023; in 2024, CTA sponsored at least 42 House staffers, 21 of whom worked on the House Energy and Commerce Committee or for committee members. CTA CEO Gary Shapiro has publicly criticized the 2007 statute as overly restrictive on lawmakers' ability to learn about emerging technology.

== Position on right-to-repair legislation ==
CTA has lobbied against state and federal right-to-repair legislation for electronics since at least the mid-2010s. In 2017, New York State lobbying records compiled from filings with the Joint Commission on Public Ethics identified CTA as among the organizations registered against the state's "Fair Repair Act" (S618A), alongside Apple, Verizon, Toyota, Lexmark, Caterpillar, Asurion, and Medtronic. CTA representatives have testified against right-to-repair bills in numerous state legislatures, including Vermont (2018), Washington (2020), Massachusetts (2020), and Nevada (2021). CTA's stated objections have generally focused on cybersecurity, consumer safety, and brand-reputation risks from third-party repair; in Nevada testimony, CTA lobbyist Walter Alcorn told legislators that manufacturers are concerned that repairs done with substandard parts could harm the customer experience. A 2021 Federal Trade Commission report to Congress, Nixing the Fix, found "scant evidence" supporting the cybersecurity arguments commonly offered by manufacturers as a basis for restricting independent repair.

== CTAPAC ==
CTAPAC is CTA's political action committee, registered with the Federal Election Commission in March 2002 (FEC committee ID C00375048) and headquartered in Arlington, Virginia. The committee is a corporate PAC that solicits contributions from CTA member-company executives and disburses them to federal candidates, leadership PACs, and party committees. In the 2017–2018 cycle, CTAPAC raised $478,819 and made $380,194 in contributions to federal candidates, split approximately 60% to Republicans and 40% to Democrats; in the 2021–2022 cycle, the committee raised $430,312 and made $212,300 in candidate contributions, split approximately 60% to Democrats and 40% to Republicans. Including individual contributions from CTA-affiliated personnel, organization-wide federal contributions in the 2024 cycle totaled $519,287 (44.92% to Democrats, 55.08% to Republicans), with the largest single recipients being the National Republican Senatorial Committee and the National Republican Congressional Committee at $30,000 each, followed by Representatives Mariannette Miller-Meeks ($19,900) and John Curtis ($15,000). The 2016 cycle was CTA's highest, at $577,226 (70.41% Republican). Oversight of CTAPAC has historically been part of the portfolio of CTA's vice president of congressional affairs.

== CTA Foundation ==
In 2009, CTA established a charitable foundation dedicated to providing seniors and the disabled with technology in order to enhance their quality of life. Selfhelp Community Services, an eldercare service organization, in New York City received the first grant issued by what was originally called the CEA Foundation. The grant was dedicated to reducing social isolation and providing better access to community services among homebound seniors using computer and internet technology.

== Hall of Fame ==
The CTA maintains a Hall of Fame, to which notable contributors to the field of consumer electronics are named.

== Name changes ==
Former CTA logo, used from 1999 until 2015

CTA originally started as the Radio Manufacturers Association (RMA) in 1924. In 1950, it changed its name to Radio-Television Manufacturers Association (RTMA). In 1953, it changed its name to Radio-Electronics-Television Manufacturers Association (RETMA). It was then the Electronic Industries Association (EIA) from 1957 to 1998, when it became the Electronic Industries Alliance. In 1995, EIA's Consumer Electronics Group (CEG) became the Consumer Electronics Manufacturers Association (CEMA). In 1999, President Gary Shapiro announced the trade group's name change from CEMA to the Consumer Electronics Association (CEA) and became an independent sector of the Electronic Industries Alliance (EIA). The name of CEA was changed to Consumer Technology Association (CTA) in November 2015.

== See also ==
- CEA 2030, multi-room audio cabling standard
