= Enlaces =

Chilean educational program

Enlaces is a Chilean educational program designed to create a structural change in Chilean education in order to prepare youth, along with their parents and guardians, to participate in the emergent society of knowledge, and to create networks of communication that help integrate them with the world. Enlaces was started in 1992 by Chile's Ministry of Education.

== Test phase ==
The testing phase of this program began in 12 schools in Santiago, the capital of Chile. After 3 years the program had extended to the Ninth Region, the Araucanía Region, (the part of the country with the largest indigenous population) with more than 100 schools participating in the program. When the government decided that this project was viable, it focused all of its efforts on the spread of this program to all the regions of the country.

== First phase ==
From 1995-2007 (the unofficial First Phase of the Enlaces project), the government spent more than $121 million and international cooperation from organizations such as the Canadian International Development Agency (CIDA) in global education, infrastructure, computers, access to educational recourses, technical assistance, and teacher training. In 2003, in order to continue their efforts to connect the country, the Ministry of Education signed an agreement with local telecommunication companies to offer low-cost broadband connection for educational institutions. Sixty percent of the students in Chile have access to broadband internet because of this agreement. In 2007, the Enlaces Program had 3,372,943 students, and 95% of the students in the country have access to computer.

== Future plans ==
In 2007, the Chilean Ministry of Education presented ExpoEnlaces 2007 where they showcased the latest innovations in Information and Communication Technology (ICT) so that people can understand the abilities of these new technologies and their uses in the classroom. That same year, the Ministry of Education published its new objectives and projects for the coming years. Didier de Saint Pierre, the executive director of Enlaces, divided the program into two phases, the first phase, which is coming to a close, focused on infrastructure in the schools and equipping them to install the necessary programs and administration. The second phase involves developing the technological infrastructure so that it has the capacity to improve the quality of learning in Chile. Once the basic technological infrastructure is in place, the Ministry will extend the technology to the remaining schools in less developed regions, and it will implement new technologies in the more advanced regions.

Examples of the new technologies that Enlaces will implement are electronic whiteboards for math, palm pilots or pocket PCs for physics, and projectors for teaching sciences. Other new strategies will include ICT in the classroom, where they will integrate portable technology and projectors in 3,000 classrooms, benefiting 87,000 students (3% of the total number of students). The goal is to implement this program in 16,000 classrooms by 2010.

The science program is a good example of the direction in which the Enlaces program is headed. A very important aspect of this program is teaching style. Enlaces encourages the use of the HEI (hypothesis, experimentation, instruction) method. The new science classes are being developed in a multimedia format using simulations delivered via the internet.

This new program offers students many benefits. The classes that follow this methodology better prepare students for lessons and projects. When presented with an experiment, students can form a hypothesis, the teacher can demonstrate every aspect of the experiment using a computer, a projection system, and the internet, and the students can follow the other steps of the scientific method. While the use of simulations is not the exactly the same as doing the physical experiment, simulation eliminates the problem of lack of equipment and materials (such as chemicals for chemistry, and animals for dissection for biology) that many schools in Chile face.

=== Adult Education ===
Part of the objective of the Enlaces program is to help the community through adult education. The idea was that children would bring the technology home with them, but this has not worked the way the Ministry had hoped. The majority of parents (especially those in rural areas) recognize the benefits of technology for their children, but feel that they cannot benefit personally. For adults who do want to learn more about technology, the Enlaces program offers an 18-hour digital literacy class where they learn the basic functions of a computer, how to use a word processor, how to use the internet, and how to create and use an email account.

== See also ==
- Education in Chile
