= Knute Buttedahl =

Knute Bjarne Buttedahl (April 9, 1925 – March 11, 2000) was a Canadian expert on global education and international development, and faculty professor of adult education at the University of British Columbia, in Vancouver BC, Canada. Buttedahl was a fellow of The World Academy of Art and Science (WAAS). In addition, he served as a project manager and field expert for the Canadian International Development Agency (CIDA), UNESCO Canada and UNICEF Canada; assisting initiatives in Africa, Asia and Latin America dedicated to Global citizenship education.

== Career in global education ==
After obtaining his PhD in Higher Education, Buttedahl had an extensive career in the field of international development and global education implementing field projects in Africa, Asia, and Latin America for the Canadian Federal Government, the IDRC International Development Research Centre and CIDA the Canadian International Development Agency, and participated in the World University Consortium.

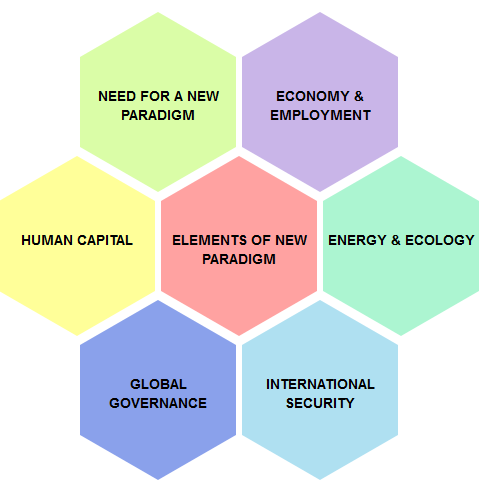

Knute's academic career started at UBC the University of British Columbia in 1965, dedicating his professional service until his retirement in 1996:

- 1965, he took the position of UBC Head of Extension Department and Temporary Director of Housing, Point Grey Campus.
- 1967, he became UBC Director of Continuing Studies and adjunct professor at the Faculty of Education.
- 1968, Professor of Adult Education, at UBC, participated at Glendon College, Conference on Canadian Education, York University.
- 1980, he co-founded (BRDA) Buttedahl Research & Development Associates, a Global Education NGO, with his third wife Dr. Prof. Paz Buttedahl providing services to developing countries, from the main office based in Vancouver BC. BRDA provided consultancy services to international development projects, multi-nationally funded by government agencies and local organizations, including the Canadian International Development Agency (CIDA), The United Nations Education, Scientific and Cultural Organization (UNESCO), the Scandinavian Development Fund, the U.S. Agency for International Development (USAID), and the Organization of American States (OAS); extending services worldwide by implementing project with teams of multidisciplinary consultants and university interns.
- 1998, he co-founded VIA Vancouver Institute for the Americas, the educational arm of BRDA, to support research on Human Resources Development and Training Programs for worldwide implementations. VIA the Vancouver Institute for the Americas assisted programs under the umbrella of UNESCO and CIDA, also participated in large multinational Educational Reform implementations

He died in 2000 at his home in Vancouver BC, Canada.

== Legacy ==
Numerous academic scholarship funds in his name. in the field of education.
