= Global Security Institute =

U.S.-based nonprofit

The Global Security Institute (GSI) is a largely private (though partly bipartisan), non-governmental international organization with a mission to eliminate nuclear weapons through international cooperation and security. It aims to influence national laws, seeking to accomplish its mission by focusing on nuclear arms control, non-proliferation, and disarmament.

== History ==
The institute was founded by US Senator Alan Cranston in October 1999. He believed that nuclear weapons are "impractical, unacceptably risky, and unworthy of civilization."

== Leadership ==
The current leadership of the institute is as follows:

- Kim Cranston – Chair of the Board, elected in 2000 after the passing of his father
- Jonathan Granoff – President

== Programs ==
The institute currently consists of four well-defined programs:

- Bipartisan Security Group – constituencies include members of the United States Congress and their staff
- Disarmament and Peace Education – constituencies include citizens and leaders in the global community
- Middle Powers Initiative – constituencies include heads of government and diplomats, primarily in Brazil, Egypt, Ireland, Mexico, New Zealand, South Africa, and Sweden
- Parliamentary Network for Nuclear Disarmament – constituencies include legislators around the world
