= Elevating Entertainment Motion Pictures =

Indie film production company

- Industry: Entertainment
- Founded: 2007
- Founder: Dave Moody; Joshua Moody
- Headquarters: Nashville, Tennessee, USA
- Products: Motion pictures
- Services: Film production, marketing, and distribution
- Website: Official website

Elevating Entertainment Motion Pictures is an indie film production company, originally based in Charlotte, NC, now headquartered in Nashville, TN.

Founded in 2007 by Grammy nominated, Dove Award winning artist, producer and filmmaker Dave Moody and his son Joshua Moody, the company is focused on producing, distributing and marketing family-friendly, uplifting, and life-inspiring motion picture entertainment.

Elevating Entertainment has produced several feature-length films, including Praise Band: The Movie, No Limit Kids: Much Ado About Middle School and Season of Miracles. The company's latest film Season of Miracles is distributed worldwide by Gaiam Vivendi Entertainment.

The company has several new projects in pre-production, including a sequel to Season of Miracles entitled Season of Mysteries.

== Filmography ==
=== Praise Band: The Movie ===
Praise Band: The Movie is a 2008 faith-based musical film starring George Hamilton IV, Adam Melton and James Dana Bryan. The screenplay was written by Joshua Moody and the film was produced and directed by Dave Moody, who also provided the musical score for the film.

=== No Limit Kids: Much Ado About Middle School ===
No Limit Kids: Much Ado About Middle School is a 2010 family comedy film starring Bill Cobbs, Lee Meriwether, Blake Michael, and Celeste Kellogg. The screenplay was written by Joshua Moody and the film was produced and directed by Dave Moody, who also provided the musical score for the film.

=== Season of Miracles ===
Season of Miracles is a 2013 faith-based dramatic film starring John Schneider, Grayson Russell, Andrew Wilson Williams, and Nancy Stafford. Based on writer Rusty Whitener's award-winning novel "A Season of Miracles," the film was directed by Dave Moody and Joshua Moody (Co-Director).
