= Lemonade Mouth =

2007 novel by Mark Peter Hughes

- Cover of Lemonade Mouth
- Author: Mark Peter Hughes
- Cover artist: Hanoch Piven
- Genre: Young adult
- Publisher: Delacorte Press
- Publication date: March 13, 2007
- Media type: Print (Hardcover, paperback) e-Book (Kindle)
- Pages: 352
- ISBN: 0-385-73392-5

Lemonade Mouth is a young adult novel by Mark Peter Hughes, published in 2007 by Delacorte Press. It follows five teenagers who meet in detention and ultimately form a band to overcome the struggles of high school, forming deep bonds with each other and learning to let go of their personal demons with each other's help. The novel was adapted into a television film by the same name starring Bridgit Mendler, Adam Hicks, Hayley Kiyoko, Naomi Scott, and Blake Michael and premiered on Disney Channel on April 15, 2011. An adapted version of the novel for younger readers was released after the release of the film. The film was well received by both audiences and critics.

== Plot ==
Five teenagers—Olivia, Stella, Charlie, Wendel "Wen", and Mohini "Mo"—meet after all ending up in detention for different reasons. While in detention, they all play and sing along together with a jingle on the radio. They decide to form a band after discussing it. At first, they have trouble agreeing on music, but soon learn to work together and get along.

The group decides to play at the Halloween Bash, but many students who are fans of Mudslide Crush, another band at the school, do not want the group to do the Bash. Ray, a member of Mudslide Crush and the school bully, harasses Olivia because of her band. Mo, Charlie, and Stella get involved to defend Olivia, and Stella spits a mouthful of lemonade into Ray's face. Ray calls Stella "lemonade mouth" and thus, the group takes "Lemonade Mouth" as their band name. Before the Bash, the lemonade machine that inspired the band is taken away as part of an agreement with a sports drink company that is sponsoring the school's new gym. This angers the band, and they decide to fight the decision.

At the Bash, many of the students are surprised at Lemonade Mouth's music when they take the stage because the band uses instruments like trumpets and ukuleles. The bandmates develop friendships and bonds with each other when they arrive at Olivia's house to console her after her cat dies. They gradually open up to one another about their problems: Stella thinks she's stupid and has problems with her parents, Wen's father will be marrying his much-younger girlfriend, Mo (an immigrant from India) feels that she doesn't belong, and Charlie's twin brother died at birth. Olivia reveals that her mother and father had sex when they were in high school, and Olivia's mother, who never loved or wanted her, left Olivia's father, Ted, to raise his daughter by himself until he was convicted of armed robbery and manslaughter. In the meantime, Charlie falls in love with Mo.

With new trust and friendship, the band becomes successful, getting on the radio and performing at a restaurant. However, things go downhill when Stella's ukulele breaks, Wen injures his lip, Charlie burns his hand, Olivia loses her voice, and Mo gets sick. All of this happens just before an annual live battle of the bands. Though the band does not do well in the competition due to their recent problems, their fans support them nevertheless, singing along to their songs to lift their spirits.

Afterwards, Charlie and Mo share a kiss and the two begin dating. Stella makes amends with her parents and finds out she has a learning disability. Wen and Olivia become attracted to each other after Wen gifts Olivia a new kitten.

== Characters ==
=== Band members/Main Characters ===
==== Olivia Whitehead ====
Olivia is the lead vocalist of the band. She also plays the accordion and writes songs for the band. Olivia is a bookworm, and often becomes nervous before band performances. Although considered shy, Olivia is sympathetic, considerate, and caring. She gets her love of books from her father, Ted. He always read to her and named her after a character from William Shakespeare's Twelfth Night.

==== Wendel "Wen" Gifford ====
Wen plays the trumpet for the band. He struggles with the fact his father will be marrying a much younger woman. He feels she wants to take the role of his mother, and is in lust with her. He later becomes attracted to Olivia. Wen seems to be the only one in the band that is able to calm Olivia down. He's usually the joker of the group and tries to laugh things off when the band gets into tough situations.

==== Stella Penn ====
Stella was born in Arizona and dislikes the fact that she had to move to a small town halfway across the country because of her mother's new job. She is a vegetarian and is very self-confident. She is headstrong and leads the band when the other members are uncertain. Though rebellious, Stella is a hard worker, and caring to her friends. She plays ukulele and is usually the toughest member of the band.

==== Mohini "Mo" Banerjee ====
Mo is a gentle-natured, intelligent girl who plays stand-up bass for the band. She finds herself socially inept and under the thumb of her strict father. She is from Calcutta, and is the only Indian girl at her school. She and Charlie have feelings for each other. She takes lessons just to make her parents happy, and assists at a local hospital. She speaks her mind and expresses her opinions. When Mo finally stands up to her parents, they finally realize they should trust her and let her be herself.

==== Charlie Hirsh ====
Charlie, who has a sweet and shy nature, plays the drums, congas, bongos and timbales for the band. Charlie struggles with the fact that he is alive instead of his stillborn twin brother Aaron. He is more than willing to stick up for himself and his friends. Charlie is misunderstood by his peers and is in love with Mo. Like Wen with Olivia, Charlie is able to calm Mo down whenever she is worried. At the end of the book, he starts dating Mo and finally lets go of Aaron.

=== Antagonists ===
- Ray Beech – Ray is a bully who hates Lemonade Mouth. He is part of the local popular rock band, Mudslide Crush. He mocks Stella, abuses Charlie, and bullies Olivia.
- Scott Pickett – Ray's best friend and drummer for Mudslide Crush. He used to date Mo, but they wound up ending the relationship because Mo caught him kissing his ex-girlfriend
- Patty Norris – A snobby cheerleader and Mudslide Crush fan, Patty is Ray's girlfriend and involved with bullying Olivia.
- Patty Keane – Another snobby Mudslide Crusher, Patty Keane is much like Patty Norris.
- Mr. Brenigan – The strict principal who believes that their high school should be all about sports. He moves all extracurricular activities like music to the school basement. He even removes the vending machine for Mel's Organic Frozen Lemonade, part of the inspiration for the band's name, from the school.

== Major themes ==
Major themes of the story include bullying, standing up for one's beliefs, and honesty. Empowerment, overcoming adversity and self-expression are all plot points in the story, brought out in the characters. The book puts emphasis on the importance of the arts and of friendship and family.

== Reception ==
The book received a positive review from Publishers Weekly, who called it "a rock-n-roll The Breakfast Club for the literary set", and "an enjoyable romp that touches on wide-ranging themes". The "Bookyurt" website graded the book with an "A−", stating, "Hughes gives us high school in all its awkward glory, and it makes for a highly entertaining read.". The January 2007 issue of Kirkus Reviews published a positive review of the novel, commending Peter Hughes for writing with "soul" and "charm".

== Film adaptation ==
In 2011, the book was adapted into a Disney Channel Original Movie, starring Bridgit Mendler as Olivia, Naomi Scott as Mo, Blake Michael as Charlie, Adam Hicks as Wen, and Hayley Kiyoko as Stella. Chris Brochu portrayed the sadistic bully Ray.

There were considerable differences between the novel and the movie. In the movie Mo and Charlie do not date, they are just good friends. And Scott eventually leaves Mudslide Crush to help Lemonade Mouth through the Battle of the Bands and he and Mo get back together. Meanwhile, Charlie expresses his feeling for Mo but when she gets back together with Scott he starts talking to another girl who likes him. In the movie, weight is not an issue for Olivia. In the novel, Olivia's mother abandoned her, while in the film her mother is dead, and while in the film her father is still in prison, it does not specify what he did. Many of the main characters' last names are changed in the movie to go with the actors playing them. The band does not use instruments such as trumpets or ukuleles in the movie; they are a pop band and use contemporary instruments such as the electric guitar and keyboard.

A sequel for the movie was planned after the success of Lemonade Mouth but Disney Channel later canceled it after being unable to come up with a new plot, feeling that the first movie had already completed its story.
