= Re-Animated =

2006 television film

- Written by: Adam Pava; Tim McKeon
- Directed by: Bruce Hurwit
- Starring: Dominic Janes; Matt Knudsen; Bil Dwyer; Eunice Cho; Micah Karns; Rachel Quaintance; Rhea Lando; Fred Willard
- Voices of: Paul Reubens; Ellen Greene; Tom Kenny; Brian Posehn
- Theme music composer: Johnny Colt
- Opening theme: "Re-Animated", performed by Johnny Colt
- Ending theme: "Re-Animated" (Extended)
- Country of origin: United States
- Original language: English

Production
- Executive producers: Michael Ouweleen; Bruce Hurwit; Adam Pava; Tim McKeon; Ashley Postlewaite (for Renegade Animation)
- Producer: Evan W. Adler
- Cinematography: Collin W. Davis
- Editors: Michael Kelly, ACE
- Running time: 78 minutes
- Production companies: Renegade Animation; Turner Studios

Original release
- Network: Cartoon Network
- Release: December 8, 2006

Related
- Out of Jimmy's Head

Re-Animated is a 2006 American live-action animated teen fantasy-comedy television film that aired on Cartoon Network on December 8, 2006. It was the first original production on the genre for the network. It was released on DVD on September 11, 2007, and serves as a pilot for the follow-up series Out of Jimmy's Head, which premiered on September 14, 2007.

The film's animation was produced by Renegade Animation, which previously produced Hi Hi Puffy AmiYumi for Cartoon Network.

== Plot ==
Jimmy Roberts is a 12-year-old middle school student who is often bullied and belittled by his peers. During his class trip to Gollyworld, an amusement park themed around animated cartoon characters created by the late Milt Appleday, Jimmy misses out on many of the attractions. On the suggestion of Jimmy's friend Craig, the popular students tell him to search for Appleday's frozen brain in the ride "Tux's Arctic Adventure". Jimmy unwillingly goes there and bumps into Milt's middle-aged, clumsy son Sonny, who is attempting to retrieve the brain. Jimmy quickly flees, only to be hit by a train ride called "Crocco's Train". He is then sent to an on-premises hospital, where Milt's brain is transplanted into his head. Jimmy survives the operation with his original brain's "personality gland" intact, allowing him to retain his identity and memories. Later at night, Jimmy discovers that he can now experience and interact with Appleday's characters.

With the help of his crush, Craig's sister Robin, Jimmy learns that Sonny unwittingly ruined the characters' popularity through his own ideas. When Jimmy is hired as the new president of Appleday Pictures, replacing Sonny, its mascot character Golly Gopher believes that Jimmy can make him famous again. With Milt's creativity and imagination, Jimmy becomes extremely popular, but he no longer has time for school or his friends. Meanwhile, Sonny deceives Jimmy's father into letting him rent out a room in Jimmy's house, and has dinner with the Roberts family while scheming to remove Milt's brain from Jimmy's head. He then devises a plan to modify Crocco's Train to include several dangerous devices that will decapitate Jimmy. However, Jimmy's alien sister Yancy hears his plan.

Robin attempts to point out to Jimmy that the cartoons are taking advantage of him, but he denies this and leaves for his television debut, and Sonny takes Robin hostage. At the studio, Jimmy tells Golly that being president has not gotten him what he really wanted, causing a furious Golly to yell at him, and Jimmy realizes that Robin was right and denounces his position on-air. He then finds out Sonny has tied Robin to the train tracks. Golly apologizes for his anger and temporarily changes Jimmy into a cartoon knight in shining armor. Jimmy goes inside the train and destroys the engine, saving Robin. He then dresses up as Milt to momentarily distract Sonny by appealing to his affection for his father. Yancy teleports Sonny home to save Jimmy, and then teleports herself. Robin and Jimmy return to Craig's house, and the boys make amends. However, the partygoers there leave after watching Jimmy's announcement and hearing him talk about the importance of friendship over popularity.

In a mid-credits scene, while Jimmy is leaving for school, Sonny attempts to extract his brain with a crane-like device, but misses.

== Cast ==
- Dominic Janes as Jimmy Roberts, a middle school student who has Milt Appleday's preserved brain transplanted into his head, enabling him to experience and interact with visions of cartoon characters.
- Matt Knudsen as Sonny Appleday, Milt Appleday's scheming son, who is determined to claim his father's brain for himself.
- Bil Dwyer as Ken Roberts, Jimmy and Yancy's father.
- Eunice Cho as Robin Yoshida, Craig's sister and Jimmy's crush.
- Micah Karns as Craig Yoshida, Robin's brother and Jimmy's so-called best friend.
- Rhea Lando as Yancy Roberts, Jimmy's adopted older sister from an alien planet.
- Rachel Quaintance as Louisa Roberts, Jimmy and Yancy's mother.
- Tom Kenny as Appleday Board Member.
- Fred Willard as Milt Appleday, a deceased animator who founded Appleday Pictures and created the characters Jimmy sees. He is loosely based on animator Walt Disney.
  - Willard also voices a robot made in Milt's likeness
- Stephanie Courtney as Donna.

=== Voice cast ===
- Paul Reubens as Golly Gopher, an energetic but rude and selfish gopher and Milt Appleday's most famous character. He is loosely based on Disney character and mascot Mickey Mouse
- Ellen Greene as Dolly Gopher, Golly's female counterpart and love interest. She is loosely based on Disney character Minnie Mouse.
- Tom Kenny as Tux, a penguin who enjoys performing stand-up comedy despite his inability to tell jokes. He is loosely based on Disney character Donald Duck.
- Brian Posehn as Crocco, a bumbling but outgoing alligator. He is loosely based on Disney character Goofy.

Two nonverbal cartoon characters, Prickles and Pickles (a porcupine and a pickle, respectively), also appear. They are loosely based on Tom Cat and Jerry Mouse, stars of the Tom and Jerry animated franchise.

== Production ==
Adam Pava and Tim McKeon had met as grad students during their time in the USC School of Cinematic Arts screenwriting program interning on sitcoms such as Friends, Malcolm in the Middle, and The Drew Carey Show before taking more regular writing jobs in animation notably with Foster's Home for Imaginary Friends and The Life and Times of Juniper Lee for Cartoon Network. During a pitch meeting with then Cartoon Network development executive Sam Register, Pava and McKeon presented their pitch of a kid named Jimmy who following an accident at an amusement park is given a brain transplant that allows him to see cartoon characters which Registered loved and commissioned the two to write a treatment which would mark the network's first original foray into live-action as the premise would feature actors in a live-action sitcom format interacting with Flash animated characters. Shannon Tindle provided the designs for the various animated characters Jimmy interacts with.

Then General Manager and Executive Vice President Jim Samples stated that Cartoon Network had been wanting to branch into live-action material for awhile as it would be a natural extension of the networks interstitials and promos that had been airing on the network. Michael Ouweleen, at the time Cartoon Network's Senior VP of Development and Creative Direction, had been with the network since 1996 when there was a "hard and fast rule" of no live-action people on the network but began gradually increasing live-action elements as he felt something was needed to contrast against the cartoons. In 2003, Ouweleen hired some actors in their 20s to host the network's Friday night block and began reaching out to schools in the Atlanta, Georgia area for background actors one of whom was Blake Michael who impressed executives enough that he was hired to host the Friday-Saturday Fried Dynamite block. Ouweleen said the rationale for moves such as these was to get people who were the same age as their target audience a move he also hoped would effect the casting for voice roles in their animated projects.

Samples said Re-Animated did not constitute a change in programming strategy for the network and claimed that live-action would only be used where it makes sense within the network while also claiming that the line between animation and live-action had been blurred in recent years citing Sam Raimi's Spider-Man film as an example of that blurred line which they were also planning to air on the network along with Who Framed Roger Rabbit as way of testing audience reception to these films. The shift in Cartoon Network's programming came at a time when the network was facing increased competition from Nickelodeon and Disney Channel, in particular citing how Cartoon Network's biggest shows Ben 10 and My Gym Partner's a Monkey only averaged 680,000 and 647,000 viewers respectively in the kids aged 6-11 demographic while Disney Channel's Hannah Montana pulled in 2.3 million in the same demographic.

In March 2006, it was reported that production had begun on Re-Animated. Ouweleen noted some behind the scenes challenges such as filming at un air conditioned locations around Los Angeles during a record breaking heatwave or Fred Willard cutting his shin during his day of shooting. Director Bruce Hurwit also had a tradition of Talk Like a Pirate Fridays where he would require the crew to dress and talk like pirates during the entire 12 hour long shoot.

== Songs ==
- "Re-Animated" (Johnny Colt)
- "The Meat Song" (Jared Forber)
- "The Party Song" (Matt Crocco)
- "Mittens' Revenge" (Johnny Colt)
- "Pure" (Superchick)
- "Today" (Joshua Rodin)
- "My Only Friend" (Ronnie Day)
- "The Love Song" (Matt Crocco)
- "K.I.T." (Johnny Colt)
- "Closer" (Joshua Rodin)
- "I Hope Tomorrow is Like Today" (Guster)
- "Cha Cha" (Chelo)
- "It's On" (Superchick)
- "Greatest Day" (Bowling for Soup)
- "Yr. My Ringo" (The Face of Hans)
- "Jimmy Hides" (Sherman Foote)

== Reception ==
Emily Ashby of Common Sense Media called it a "brain-swap tale [that] will have tweens' eyes rolling".

== TV series ==
In February 2007, after Re-Animated premiered Cartoon Network's highest rated original movie with kids aged 6-11, Cartoon Network gave a season order to a spin-off TV series also to be titled Re-Animated.

In July of that year, it was reported that the series had been re-titled to Out of Jimmy's Head Dominic Janes, Matt Knudsen, Bil Dwyer, Rhea Lando, and Rachel Quaintance reprised their roles from the pilot film, while Jon Kent Ethridge II and Tinashe Kashingwe would be taking over the roles of Craig and Robin who had been played by Micah Karns and Eunice Cho.
