= Out of Jimmy's Head =

American live-action animated teen sitcom

- Genre: Comedy; Teen sitcom; Slapstick
- Created by: Tim McKeon; Adam Pava
- Based on: Re-Animated by: Tim McKeon; Adam Pava
- Starring: Bil Dwyer; Jon Kent Ethridge II; Dominic Janes; Tinashe; Matt Knudsen; Rhea Lando
- Voices of: Carlos Alazraqui; Tom Kenny; Ellen Greene; Brian Posehn
- Theme music composer: Paul Buckley
- Opening theme: "Out of Jimmy's Head"
- Ending theme: "Out of Jimmy's Head" (instrumental)
- Composer: Paul Buckley
- Country of origin: United States
- Original language: English
- No. of seasons: 1
- No. of episodes: 20

Production
- Executive producers: Eric Kaplan; Sean McNamara; David Brookwell; Adam Pava; Tim McKeon; Bruce Hurwit
- Producer: Pixie Wespiser
- Production location: Downey, California
- Cinematography: Bob Hayes
- Editors: Bill Lowe; Jan Lucas; Clayton Woodhull; Andy Zall
- Camera setup: Multi-camera
- Running time: 22 minutes
- Production companies: Brookwell McNamara Entertainment; Cartoon Network Studios

Original release
- Network: Cartoon Network
- Release: September 14, 2007 – May 29, 2008

Out of Jimmy's Head (abbreviated as OOJH) is an American live-action animated teen sitcom created by Tim McKeon and Adam Pava for Cartoon Network. It is based on the network's 2006 film Re-Animated, and is the first live-action/animated television series produced by Cartoon Network. The series was produced by Cartoon Network Studios and Brookwell McNamara Entertainment (the latter known for Disney's shows such as Even Stevens and That's So Raven). The creators, Tim McKeon and Adam Pava, were originally writers for other Cartoon Network shows such as Foster's Home for Imaginary Friends and The Life and Times of Juniper Lee, before creating Weighty Decisions, a short on the network's Sunday Pants anthology series.

The series premiered on Cartoon Network on September 14, 2007, to coincide with the release of the Re-Animated film on DVD, and was the only series on the network to be affected by the 2007–08 Writers Guild of America strike. The U.S. run of the series ended with the airing of the series' final episode on May 29, 2008. The series has never streamed on HBO Max.

Although Renegade Animation did the pilot film's animation, due to budget and time constraints, the series' animation was produced in-house at Cartoon Network Studios through their Flash division. Cartoon Network did not acknowledge the series again until 2018, where Golly had a cameo role on OK K.O.! Let's Be Heroes, in the season two episode, "Crossover Nexus".

== Premise ==
The series follows the backstory established by the film. After receiving the brain of deceased cartoonist Milt Appleday following an accident, 12-year-old (later 13) Jimmy Roberts finds himself inexplicably capable of seeing and communicating with Appleday's characters, resulting in a variety of odd predicaments at the hands of Jimmy's interactions with them. However, he also must deal with Appleday's son Sonny, who intends to kill him and obtain his brain so he may gain notoriety as a cartoonist and take over the world.

== Cast ==
=== Main ===
- Dominic Janes as Jimmy Roberts, a student who had the brain of the late animator Milt Appleday transplanted into his head while retaining his own personality and memories, giving him the power to experience and interact with Appleday's cartoon character creations
- Tinashe as Robin Wheeler, Jimmy's crush and Craig's sister. Eunice Cho played Robin Yoshida in Re-Animated. Originally Japanese American, this version of the character is African American along with her brother.
- Bil Dwyer as Ken Roberts, Jimmy and Yancy's father who works as a guidance counselor
- Jon Kent Ethridge II as Craig Wheeler, Jimmy's best friend and Robin's brother. Micah Karns played Craig Yoshida in Re-Animated.
- Rhea Lando as Yancy Roberts, Jimmy's adopted extraterrestrial sister
- Matt Knudsen as Sonny Appleday, Milt Appleday's son, who convinced Jimmy's parents to let him rent out a room in their house and now constantly schemes to steal his father's brain from Jimmy
- Carlos Alazraqui as the voice of Golly Gopher, the gopher de facto mascot of Appleday Pictures. Paul Reubens voiced Golly Gopher in Re-Animated.
- Ellen Greene as the voice of Dolly Gopher, Golly's female counterpart and love interest
- Tom Kenny as the voice of Tux the Penguin, a penguin who enjoys performing standup comedy
- Brian Posehn as the voice of Crocco the Alligator, a bumbling but outgoing alligator

=== Recurring ===
- Rachel Quaintance as Louisa Roberts, Jimmy and Yancy's mother, whose job involves going on missions to other planets
- Jonina Gable as Becky
- Christian Vandal as Logan
- Austin Rogers as Animal Loving Kevin
- Terrence Hardy Jr. as Easily Excited Kid
- Caden Michael Gray as Crazy Jake
- Katelin Petersen as Hildy Jeffries
- Nicole Smolen as Young Yancy
- Nolan Gould as Young Jimmy
- Ryan Eggold as Mike Werewolfowitz, a werewolf student who becomes romantically interested in Yancy

== Episodes ==
Season	Episodes	Originally released	
Season	Episodes	First released	Last released
Pilot		December 8, 2006	
1	20	September 14, 2007	May 29, 2008

=== Pilot film (2006) ===
Title	Directed by	Written by	Original release date
Re-Animated	Bruce Hurwit	Tim McKeon & Adam Pava	December 8, 2006
Jimmy Roberts, a 12-year-old boy, requires a brain transplant after a tragic accident in Gollyworld. Not only is he granted a new life, but his new brain allows him to see cartoon characters in real life. First appearance of: Jimmy Roberts, Robin, Sonny, and Craig.

=== Season 1 (2007–08) ===
No.	Title	Directed by	Written by	Original release date
1	"Talent Show"	Sean McNamara	Tim McKeon & Adam Pava	September 14, 2007
Jimmy offends Tux after he refuses to use the penguin's jokes in a school talent show. Guest Stars: Courtney Hope as Humorless Teen Girl, and John Bliss as Gramps
2	"Friends"	Sean McNamara	Tim McKeon & Adam Pava	September 21, 2007
An evil principal obsessed with spitballs drives a wedge between Jimmy and Craig's friendship, and threatens to kick Robin out of school. Meanwhile, Crocco shocks Golly when he tells him he is not his best friend. Guest Stars: Becky Thyre as Principal Muriel J. Fairplay, and George Frangides as The Janitor Absent: Matt Knudsen as Sonny Appleday, and Rhea Lando as Yancy Roberts
3	"Sleepover"	Jonathan Judge	Tim McKeon & Adam Pava	September 28, 2007
Yancy holds a boy-bashing sleepover, which upsets Jimmy after Robin shows up. Elsewhere, Jimmy's father takes a space joyride and Dolly loses touch with her feminine side. Guest Stars: Jenn Shagrin as Humorless Teen Girl, and Courtney Hope as Angry Teen Girl
4	"Mascot"	Jonathan Winfrey	Tim McKeon & Adam Pava	October 5, 2007
Jimmy becomes the school mascot by assuming Crocco's look, but it soon changes his behavior. Elsewhere, Yancy spends a day at work with her mother. Guest Stars: Amy Tolsky as Coach, and Pat Finn as Daryl
5	"Ghosts"	Gregory Hobson	Tom Martin	October 12, 2007
In the Halloween-themed episode Jimmy thinks he sees ghosts in an attic classroom, which Craig spots as a money-making opportunity. Elsewhere, Sonny hatches a new plan to get into Jimmy's brain. Guest Stars: David Reynolds as Frankenstein's Monster, Jane Sibbett as Ms. Shank, Irene Roseen as Carol Ann, Grey DeLisle as Ghost Mouth/Misshapen Moose, and Katelin Petersen as Hildy Jeffries
6	"Sick Day"	Jonathan Judge	Kevin Seccia	November 2, 2007
Jimmy and Robin skip school to ride a roller coaster. Elsewhere, Sonny creates a robot version of Jimmy. Guest Star: Adam Conway as Jimbotron
7	"Bully"	Savage Steve Holland	Tim McKeon & Adam Pava	November 9, 2007
A bully with a secret lair targets Jimmy and tries to steal Robin. Elsewhere, Sonny snatches a baseball player's brain. Guest Stars: Annie O'Donnell as CKW's Mom, Adam Cagley as Sergei, E.J. Callahan as CKW's Dad, Reed Alexander as C. Kingsley Weatherhead, and Michael Cornacchia as Junior
8	"Skate Night"	Savage Steve Holland	Tim McKeon & Adam Pava	November 16, 2007
Robin organizes a fundraising event at the local skating rink, and in hopes to win her over another skater, Jimmy learns to skate while Sonny gets a new job. Guest Stars: Shadoe Stevens from the John Davidson version of Hollywood Squares as D.J. Cashew, Tom Kenny as Animated Logan Ogre, and Aviva as Employee Emily
9	"Soda"	Jonathan Winfrey	Sarah Peters	November 30, 2007
A reporter for the school newspaper does a story on Jimmy, but she is secretly investigating Craig and his bootleg soda operation. Elsewhere, Yancy gives Sonny romantic advice. Guest Stars: Kieran Newton as The Editor, Katelin Petersen as Hildy Jeffries, and Mary Birdsong as Cosima Von Darkness
10	"Detention"	Jim Drake	Kevin Seccia & Sarah Peters	December 7, 2007
Jimmy and Craig have to get out of detention to prevent Robin from finding out Jimmy's most embarrassing secret. Guest Stars: Eve Brent as Rita, and Helen Slayton-Hughes as Doris
11	"Ambush"	Sean McNamara	Conrad Klein	December 14, 2007
After Robin blames Jimmy for ruining her rock opera, she looks for revenge during the school's annual game of Ambush. Golly gets arrested for the pranks on his cartoons while getting hit by an anvil and elsewhere, Sonny creates a nice clone and an evil clone. Guest Stars: Carlos Alazraqui as Officer Akita, and Charlie Stewart as Zeus
12	"Cartoons Drive"	Sean McNamara	Michael Yank	February 18, 2008
Jimmy helps Robin with her campaign for school president, but when she refuses to use his plan to save the old school parking lot tree, he decides to run against her. Meanwhile, Golly, Crocco and Tux accidentally release Jimmy's most embarrassing memories inside his brain which end up in Jimmy's pupil. Guest Stars: Carlos Alazraqui as Memory 1, Brian Posehn as Memory 2, and Tom Kenny as Memory 3
13	"Outdoors"	Jim Drake	Kevin Seccia	March 7, 2008
Jimmy goes into the wilderness with a cartoon owl to verify his father's accomplishments, while Sonny disguises himself as a bear to steal Jimmy's brain. Guest Stars: Michael Pataki as Hoots Burly, Nicole Smolen as Young Yancy, Nolan Gould as Young Jimmy, and Dave Florek as Ranger Millican
14	"Craig Steals Dad"	Sean McNamara	Michael Yank	March 14, 2008
Jimmy becomes wary of his dad's growing friendship with Craig. Elsewhere, Crocco and Yancy connect. Guest Stars: Gregg Binkley as Notary, Keith Diamond as Mr. Wheeler, and Sybil Azur as Mrs. Wheeler
15	"Stunt"	Lawrence Guterman	Michael Yank	March 21, 2008
Craig and Jimmy devise an over-the-top stunt in hopes of one-upping a viral video star. Elsewhere, Robin and Becky work with Jimmy's father. Guest Stars: Ryan Pinkston as Donny Ironsides, Jordi Caballero as Mexican Newscaster, Ryan Alvarez as Larry Wasserman, Patrick Warburton as Moonbounce #1, April Winchell as Moonbounce #2, Tabitha St. Germain as Moonbounce #3, and Charlie Adler as Moonbounce #4
16	"Princess"	David Brookwell	Eric Kaplan	March 28, 2008
Jimmy is jealous when Robin has a date for movie night at the Roberts residence, so he uses Sonny's new invention to make a cartoon princess come to life as his own date. Sonny, meanwhile, decides to fill the princess' spot and learns what animated life is really like. Guest Stars: Austin Butler as Lance, Peter Marr as Prince Lochinvar, April Bowlby as Princess Gugulfa, Selwyn Miller as Troll, Rose Abdoo as Witch, Carlos Alazraqui as Pigeon, Tom Kenny as Squirrel, Brian Posehn as Foot, and Sean McNamara as King
17	"Movie"	Lawrence Guterman	Eric Kaplan	May 8, 2008
The boys make an alien-invasion movie and trick Yancy into the starring role. The plan backfires when Yancy's extraterrestrial ex-boyfriend wants a part in the film as well. Guest Stars: Brian Posehn as Warthog, Tom Kenny as Doc/Female Gopher, Carlos Alazraqui as Female Tornado, Jenn Shagrin as Humorless Teen Girl, and Mitch Silpa as Durzagon
18	"Bad Fad"	Lawrence Guterman	Michael Yank	May 15, 2008
Stressed by debate practice and other activities, Jimmy regresses to childhood after falling in with an unsophisticated clique. Meanwhile, in an effort to score money for a new video game, Craig works as a babysitter while Dolly babysits Tux's nephews. Note: Blake Michael from Fried Dynamite guest stars in this episode. Guest Stars: Chloe Suazo as Undine, Sterling Knight as Brad, Blake Michael as Stop Light Kid, Atticus Shaffer as Aaron, Khamani Griffin as Cody, Tom Virtue as Main Judge, Carlos Alazraqui as Cruxie, Tom Kenny as Nuxie, and Brian Posehn as Luxie
19	"Out of Jimmy's Body"	Lawrence Guterman	Eric Kaplan	May 22, 2008
In order to take Robin to see a movie, Jimmy asks Sonny for help to make him look older. However, instead of making him look older, Sonny switches bodies with Jimmy so he can see the Appleday cartoons. Meanwhile, Jimmy's father, a parrot, Robin and her piano teacher also switch bodies. Guest Star: Ellen Albertini Dow as Miss Plattner
20	"Lunch Tables"	Bruce Hurwit	Kenny Byerly	May 29, 2008
Jimmy earns a spot at the cool kids' table. Elsewhere, Craig finds love with Becky and Robin forgets her lunch money. Guest Stars: Christopher David as Desperate Kid, Lil' Romeo as Himself, Patricia Belcher as Lunchlady Edna, and Tom Kenny as Getalong Gary

== Broadcast and reception ==
For Out of Jimmy's Head, Cartoon Network ordered 20 episodes, which were filmed from May to September 2007. In airing the series, Cartoon Network split the series into two seasons. The first season of the series premiered in September 2007 and lasted 13 episodes. The channel later aired the remaining seven episodes as the second season, starting in March 2008, one week after the airing of episode 13. Writing and production for all episodes was completed in September. The 2007–08 Writers Guild of America strike prevented the writers from being involved in editing and post-production, including the decision to add a laugh track beginning with episode 8, "Skate Night". It then made its Canadian premiere on Teletoon on Saturday, September 6, 2008. It also aired on Boomerang in Australia.

It was the last Cartoon Network original series to be broadcast in full screen 4:3 before Cartoon Network started its own high-definition feed, although it was produced in a widescreen aspect ratio of 16:9.

Neil Genzlinger of The New York Times wrote: "Cast aside all that clutter, though, and this is really just another show about a seventh grader trying to fit in. It's also a show with a sly sense of humor when it's not being self-consciously frentic", and praised Bil Dwyer for his comedic role. Emily Ashby of Common Sense Media rated the show 3 out of 5 stars and wrote: "It's just fun fluff. It is worth noting that the show is an improvement on the movie in terms of Jimmy's increased confidence and ability to fend off peer pressure, which is certainly a welcome change".

The show received a few accolades: the program's cast won a combined Young Artist Award in 2008 for "Best Young Ensemble Performance in a TV Series", then was nominated at the same ceremony for "Best Family Television Series", and finally Tinashe Kachingwe with Caden Michael Gray were nominated for "Best Performance in a TV Series – Supporting Young Actress" and "Best Performance in a TV Series – Recurring Young Actor", respectively.
