= Dave Moody (musician) =

American singer-songwriter

- Dave Moody at Disneyland Paris (2008)

Background information
- Born: May 24, 1962 (age 64); Fayetteville, North Carolina
- Genres: Country, Bluegrass, Americana
- Occupations: Singer-songwriter, session musician, producer, composer, filmmaker
- Instruments: singer, guitar, mandolin, drums
- Years active: 1980s-present
- Label: Lamon Records
- Website: https://www.davemoody.com/

David B. Moody is an artist, producer, songwriter and filmmaker from North Carolina. His instrumental proficiency has earned him two Grammy Award Nominations and three International CMA Awards as a member of The Moody Brothers. After becoming regular performers on the Grand Ole Opry and touring extensively throughout Europe in the 80s, the trio of Carolina brothers signed a contract with the Walt Disney Company in 1992 to open and perform their own nightly concerts at Disneyland Paris' Disney Village, where they performed for over 50 million guests during their time in France.

Then, Dave's accomplishments as a solo artist, producer, and songwriter began to flourish. After returning home from Paris, he re-established the family label Lamon Records and his own Dave Moody Productions. His tribute to guitarist Chet Atkins "Will The Circle Be Unbroken" was nominated for a Dove Award in 2002. This led to his winning two GMA Dove Awards (the Christian Music Grammys) in 2005 and 2006, and 20 other Dove nominations along the way to emerge as a major Christian music industry professional. In 2007, Dave was among the Dove Awards most nominated with six nominations as an artist, producer and songwriter.

In 2007, Dave turned a portion of his attention to directing, writing and scoring music for motion pictures and television. His first venture into the movies was to write and score the musical motion picture Stuck in the Past, produced by Dog ‘N Doggie Productions. This quirky film and Dave's soundtrack, which features everything from bluegrass to broadway to 50's rockabilly and more, won "Best Musical Film" at the 2008 Creation Arts Film Festival in Edmonton, Alberta, Canada.

Dave and his son Joshua Moody started Elevating Entertainment Motion Pictures where they wrote, produced and directed their first family film, Praise Band: The Movie which was released in 2008. The Moodys' second film No Limit Kids: Much Ado About Middle School, featuring Bill Cobbs and Golden Globe Nominee Lee Meriwether was released in 2010.

In 2010, Dave and Colin Elliott from Ireland produced the George Hamilton IV & Friends album Old Fashioned Hymns and Gospel Songs...for Those Who Miss Them which featured musical guests Ricky Skaggs, Marty Stuart, Gail Davis, Pat Boone, Del McCoury, Charlie Pride, Bill Anderson, Connie Smith, Tommy Cash, Cliff Barrows, George Beverly Shea and many others. The track "I'm Using My Bible for a Roadmap" featuring Del McCoury and The Moody Brothers was nominated for a 2011 Dove Award by the members of the Gospel Music Association.

The Moodys continue to balance their time between producing music and movies. Their company's third feature-length motion picture Season of Miracles was based on the novel by Rusty Whitener. This 2013 film starred John Schneider, Grayson Russell, Andrew Wilson Williams and Nancy Stafford and was distributed by Gaiam Vivendi Entertainment.

In 2015, Dave was elected as an Officer of the Nashville Musicians Association, AFM Local 257 of the American Federation of Musicians (AFM) where he serves as a member of the Hearing Board. Also in 2015, Dave produced a new classic country album by Buddy Jewell, winner of the first Nashville Star on USA Network who has had several Billboard Number 1s. The album My Father's Country featured a collection of classic country songs, including Abilene, Behind Closed Doors, Galveston and other songs Jewell grew up listening to his father sing.

In 2016, the Moodys produced the sequel to Season of Miracles entitled Season of Mysteries as well as the feature film Silver Twins written by Larry Silver. Both pictures were filmed in Nashville. Throughout 2016, Dave hosted The New Nashville Showcase®, a monthly concert series featuring new and upcoming artists across multi music genres.

Dave and his family launched a second motion picture brand Downbeat Films in 2017 to create and release a wide variety of indie feature film genres. They produced a new suspense thriller, All Light Will End, along with Red Vessel Entertainment, Music City Films and Ghost Horse. The cast for this feature, written by Chris Blake, included Andy Buckley, Sarah Butler, John Schuck, Sam Jones III, Ashley Pereira, Ted Welch, Aaron Munoz, and Alexandra Harris. The film was acquired for distribution by Gravitas Ventures and released in November 2018. The film won a number of festival awards and was released on Netflix in February 2019. The Moodys other film and music projects include the patriotic drama No Time To Run, featuring Christina Marie Karis, Mark Collins, and Herman Cain, was released in 2020 and Distancing Socially, a comedy drama shot during Covid, starring Alan Tudyk, Sarah Levy and Andy Buckley was released in 2021.

In 2025, Dave started a YouTube channel. The channel features a series entitled "Covers with Friends." According to his channel, the series was conceived in the early months after Dave's liver transplant when he re-discovered his love for music after being sick for several years. Dave invites friends, family and session players he's worked with over the years to join him in recording covers in a variety of styles and genres.

== Personal life ==
Dave Moody was born in Fayetteville, North Carolina on May 24, 1962. His father was Dwight L. Moody Jr and his mother Katherine Lucille "Cathy" (Little). He graduated from Independence High School in Mint Hill, North Carolina in 1980 and earned his B.A. History from the University of North Carolina at Charlotte in 1984. During his teens, Dave was active in scouting and became an Eagle Scout in 1978 and earned the Distinguished Service Award from the Order of the Arrow in 1986. Dave was honored with the Distinguished Alumni Award and Alumni Hall of Fame recognition from the University of North Carolina at Charlotte in 1990. He married Susan Patricia Davis from Florence, SC in 1984 and the couple has two children, Joshua and Rebecca. His family lived in Mt. Juliet, Tennessee until moving to Ponte Vedra, Florida in 2022.

== Discography ==
Member of The Moody Brothers

- Cotton Eyed Joe (1985)
- The Moody Brothers (1987)
- Brother To Brother (1989)
- Guitar Boogie (1992)

Member of PraiseStreet Worship Band

- All Of You (2000)
- Come And Worship (2000)
- Worship The King (2002)
- Te Amo Dios (2004)

Solo artist

- I Will Follow You (2001)
- Blinded (2003)
- Right Where I Belong (2005)
- Feels Like Home (2007)
- Seasons (2024)

Motion picture soundtracks

- Stuck in the Past (2008)
- Praise Band: The Movie (2008)
- No Limit Kids: Much Ado About Middle School (2010)
- Season of Miracles (2013)
- No Time To Run (2020)
- Distancing Socially (2021)

== Feature films ==
- Composer: Stuck In The Past (2008) for Dog 'N Doggie Productions
- Director, Producer & Composer: Praise Band: The Movie (2008) for Elevating Entertainment
- Producer, Director: Jimmy Paul The Pug Tooth Fairy (2010) (Animated Short Film)
- Producer, Director: Elf Sparkle & The Special Red Dress (2010) (Animated Film)
- Composer: Generational Curses (2010) for Flenory Productions
- Director, Producer & Composer: No Limit Kids: Much Ado About Middle School (2010) for Elevating Entertainment
- Director, Producer & Composer: Season of Miracles (2013) for Elevating Entertainment, distributed by Gaiam Vivendi Entertainment
- Director, Producer & Composer: Silver Twins (2017) for Elevating Entertainment, distributed by Pure Flix
- Director, Producer & Composer: Shakespeare School Year (2018) for Elevating Entertainment, distributed by Pure Flix
- Producer & Composer: All Light Will End (2018) for Downbeat Films, distributed by Gravitas Ventures
- Producer: Distancing Socially (20210 for MonkeyRat Productions, Downbeat Films, 3rd Films, distributed by Cinedigm

== Television ==
- Composer/Producer: National commercials for Bojangles, Pepsi, NBA, Kanawha Insurance, and others
- Composer: Theme Song Robbin's Nest (2008) for Uplifting Entertainment (TBN)
- Creator/Producer: On A Blue Ridge Sunday Christian Music Series (2009)

== Awards and nominations ==
=== Grammy Awards ===
Nominations

- 1985 nominated for Grammy Award – Best Country Instrumental Performance Cotton Eyed Joe The Moody Brothers
- 1990 nominated for Grammy Award – Best Country Instrumental Performance Great Train Song Medley The Moody Brothers

=== GMA Dove Awards ===
Winner

- 2005 won Dove Award – Spanish Language Album of the Year Te Amo Dios / PraiseStreet Worship Band Artist/Producer/Songwriter
- 2006 won Dove Award – Spanish Language Album of the Year Leonardo Executive Producer

Nominations

- 2002 nominated for Dove Award – Country Recorded Song of the Year Will The Circle Be Unbroken Artist/Producer
- 2003 nominated for Dove Award – Country Recorded Song of the Year God Is Good All The Time Artist/Producer
- 2004 nominated for Dove Award – Bluegrass Recorded Song of the Year Love Is Free / George Hamilton IV with The Moody Brothers Artist/Producer/Songwriter
- 2004 nominated for Dove Award – Bluegrass Album of the Year On A Blue Ridge Sunday / George Hamilton IV Producer
- 2005 nominated for Dove Award – Bluegrass Recorded Song of the Year Little Mountain Church House Artist/Producer
- 2005 nominated for Dove Award – Southern Gospel Album of the Year faith, hope, joy / Young Harmony Producer
- 2006 nominated for Dove Award – Country Album of the Year About You Producer
- 2006 nominated for Dove Award – Bluegrass Album of the Year So Glad / The Bradleys Producer
- 2007 nominated for Dove Award – Traditional Gospel Album of the Year Sing to the Lord A New Song / Alabama Spirituals Producer
- 2007 nominated for Dove Award – Bluegrass Album of the Year Ancient of Days / Harvest Wind Producer
- 2007 nominated for Dove Award – Special Events Album of the Year Bluegrass Gospel Time Artist/Producer
- 2007 nominated for Dove Award – Southern Gospel Album of the Year Strength / Young Harmony Producer
- 2007 nominated for Dove Award – Bluegrass Recorded Song of the Year If I Could Hear My Mother Pray Again Artist/Producer
- 2007 nominated for Dove Award – Country Album of the Year Feels Like Home Artist/Producer
- 2010 nominated for Dove Award – Bluegrass Album of the Year I Have Been Blessed / Far City Boys
- 2011 nominated for Dove Award – Bluegrass Recorded Song of the Year I'm Using My Bible for a Roadmap Artist/Producer

=== Film Awards ===
Winner

- 2008 Winner Creation Arts Film Festival (Edmonton, Alberta, Canada) – Stuck in the Past "Best Musical Film" Composer
- 2008 Winner International Christian Film Festival (Irvine, California) – Praise Band: The Movie Best Music Film" Producer/Director/Composer
- 2009 Winner BC International Film Festival (Dallas, Texas) – Praise Band: The Movie "2nd Place Best Feature Production" Producer/Director/Composer
- 2010 Winner Phoenix International Film Festival (Phoenix, Arizona) – No Limit Kids: Much Ado About Middle School "Best Film for Young Viewers" Producer/Director/Composer
- 2010 Winner Redemptive Film Festival (Regent University, Virginia) – No Limit Kids: Much Ado About Middle School "Redemptive Storytellers Award" Producer/Director/Composer
- 2010 Winner Independents' Film Festival (Tampa, Florida) – No Limit Kids: Much Ado About Middle School "Best Independent Feature Film" Producer/Director/Composer
- 2011 Winner Silver Telly Award – No Limit Kids: Much Ado About Middle School "Film/Video Category Winner" Producer/Director/Composer
- 2018 Winner Tupelo Film Festival – All Light Will End "Best Feature Film" Producer/Composer

Nominations/Official Selections

- 2008 Nominee Sabaoth Film Festival (Milan, Italy) – "Best First Production" Praise Band: The Movie Producer/Director
- 2011 Nominee KIDS FIRST! Film Festival (San Francisco, California) – "Best Indie Feature Ages 8–12" No Limit Kids: Much Ado About Middle School Producer/Director/Composer
- 2010 Official Selection Gideon Film Festival (Asheville, North Carolina) – "No Limit Kids: Much Ado About Middle School" Producer/Director/Composer
- 2010 Official Selection KIDS FIRST! Film Festival (San Francisco, California) – No Limit Kids: Much Ado About Middle School Producer/Director/Composer
- 2010 Official Selection TriMedia Film Festival (Ft Collins, Colorado) – No Limit Kids: Much Ado About Middle School Producer/Director/Composer
- 2010 Official Selection International Black Film Festival of Nashville (Nashville, Tennessee) – Generational Curses Composer
- 2010 Official Selection International Black Film Festival of Nashville (Nashville, Tennessee) – No Limit Kids: Much Ado About Middle School Producer/Director/Composer
- 2010 Official Selection Eugene International Film Festival (Eugene, Oregon) – No Limit Kids: Much Ado About Middle School Producer/Director/Composer
- 2013 Official Selection Gideon Film Festival (Orlando, Florida) – Season of Miracles Producer/Director/Composer
- 2013 Official Selection Dixie Film Festival (Atlanta, Georgia) – Season of Miracles Producer/Director/Composer
- 2018 Official Selection Toronto International Spring of Horror (Toronto, Canada) – All Light Will End Producer/Composer
- 2018 Official Selection Milledgeville Film Festival (Milledgeville, GA) – All Light Will End Producer/Composer
