= The Munsters Today =

American television sitcom, 1988 to 1991

- Genre: Sitcom
- Directed by: Norman Abbott; Bob Claver; Bonnie Franklin; Peter Isacksen; Marlene Laird; Lee Lochhead; Russ Petranto; Scott Redman; Doug Rogers
- Starring: John Schuck; Lee Meriwether; Howard Morton; Hilary Van Dyke; Jason Marsden
- Theme music composer: Jack Marshall
- Composers: Bill Fulton; Larry Groupé
- Country of origin: United States
- Original language: English
- No. of seasons: 3
- No. of episodes: 72

Production
- Executive producers: Arthur L. Annecharico; Bryan Joseph; Lloyd J. Schwartz
- Producer: Bryan Joseph
- Camera setup: Multi-camera
- Running time: 22–24 minutes
- Production companies: The Arthur Company; MCA TV

Original release
- Network: Syndication
- Release: October 8, 1988 – June 8, 1991

Related
- The Munsters

The Munsters Today is an American sitcom and a revival of the original 1964–66 sitcom The Munsters that aired in syndication from October 8, 1988, to June 8, 1991.

== Plot ==
The series concerns the day-to-day life of a family of benign monsters, with married couple Herman Munster and vampire Lily Munster. Lily's Father Grandpa, who is also a vampire, lives with the family. Herman and Lily have a son named Eddie, who is a werewolf, and their niece, Marilyn, whom the family deems as strange, but is the only “normal” member of the family, also lives with them.

This sequel series starts with Grandpa creating "Sleeping Chambers", coffins which make the user fall asleep for a selected amount of time, and insisting the entire family try them out. After Grandpa sets the dial for 30 minutes and shuts the door, a flash of light and a falling beam change the dial to "Forever". Twenty-two years later, a man named Mr. Prescott and his assistant explore the Munsters' house with plans to turn it into a parking lot when they unknowingly awaken the Munsters from their Sleeping Chambers. Finding themselves in the 1980s, the Munsters work to adjust themselves to the current time period.

== Cast ==
=== Main cast ===
The cast of "The Munsters Today."

- John Schuck as Herman Munster
- Lee Meriwether as Lily Munster
- Jason Marsden as Edward "Eddie" Wolfgang Munster
- Hilary Van Dyke as Marilyn Munster
- Howard Morton as "Grandpa" Vladimir Dracula

=== Recurring cast ===
- Mary Cadorette as Dee Dee Nelson
- Richard Steven Horvitz as Howie Buchanan
- Greg Mullavey as Roger Nelson
- Scott Reeves as Dustin Nelson

=== Special guest stars ===
- Kaye Ballard as Mother Earth
- Billy Barty as Genie
- Shelley Berman as Sam Hawkins
- Jonathan Brandis as Matt Glover
- Dr. Joyce Brothers as Mrs. Cousins
- Ruth Buzzi as Dracula's Mother and, in another episode, Miss Finster
- Gordon Cooper as Himself
- Bill Daily as Count Strimpkin
- Dustin Diamond as Rob
- Moosie Drier as Andy Graves
- Nancy Dussault as Dr. Sandra Brown
- Nanette Fabray as Dottie
- Norman Fell as Mr. Maurice
- Christopher Fielder as Damien
- Lucy Lee Flippin as Natasha Jones
- Kathleen Freeman as Grandma
- George Furth as Dr. Carver
- Zsa Zsa Gabor as Herself
- Kip King as Burt Fearman
- Dave Madden as Mr. Preston
- Eddie Mekka as Mr. Sweetzer
- Richard Moll as Genghis Khan
- Pat Morita as Mr. Watanabe
- Don Most as Barney Morley
- Lois Nettleton as Jessica Brown
- Daniel Riordan as Headlock Henderson
- Marcia Wallace as Dr. Susan Evans
- Jo De Winter as Katja Dracula
- Yetta as Shirley

== Production ==
=== Development ===
This color revival of The Munsters starred John Schuck (Herman), Lee Meriwether (Lily), Howard Morton (Grandpa), Hilary Van Dyke (Marilyn) and Jason Marsden (Eddie), and broadcast 72 episodes from October 8, 1988, to May 25, 1991, giving it more first-run episodes than the original series. The pilot explained the 22-year gap following the original series by showing the family as they were in 1966. They were testing out a machine that Grandpa had created. The machine allows someone to sleep for ages without aging. But then an accident took place; the family then proceeds to sleep for years, only to wake up in 1988.

It was created following a failed attempt to revive the show with most of the original cast (Fred Gwynne, Al Lewis and Yvonne De Carlo) in the 1981 NBC telefilm The Munsters' Revenge.

== Episodes ==
=== Pilot ===
Title	Directed by	Written by	Original release date
"Still the Munsters After All These Years"	John Robins	Lloyd J. Schwartz	Unaired
Series pilot: Grandpa creates "Sleeping Chambers," coffins which make the user fall asleep for a selected amount of time, and insists the entire family try them out. After Grandpa sets the dial for 30 minutes and shuts the door, a flash of light and a falling beam change the dial to "Forever." Twenty-two years later, a developer named Mr. Preston (Dave Madden) and his assistant want to buy the Munsters' home and turn it into a parking lot. While Mr. Preston and his assistant are exploring the house, down in Grandpa's lab, the assistant gets tangled in spider webs and knocks the dial to "off." The Munster family awakens to the world of 1988 and have to figure out a way to buy back their own house which is being foreclosed upon due to 22 years of missed taxed payments and fines.

=== Season 1 (1988–89) ===
No. overall	No. in season	Title	Directed by	Written by	Original release date
1	1	"Vampire Pie"	Norman Abbott	Barbara Berkowitz	October 8, 1988
Herman decides to enter a baking contest, using an old family recipe. Too bad there was an ingredient Grandpa forgot...
2	2	"A Little Russian Dressing"	Dick Harwood	Hope Juber & Lloyd J. Schwartz	October 15, 1988
Grandpa won three wishes from the Transylvania Idiots Clearing Sweepstakes, but what he really wanted was a Bacon Lettuce Tarantula sandwich .
3	3	"Flyweight Champion of the World"	Bob Claver	Bryan Joseph	October 22, 1988
After being bullied, Grandpa mixes Eddie a strong-man formula that inflates Eddie's ego as well as his muscles.
4	4	"Magna Cum Munsters"	Bob Claver	Ann Gibbs & Joel Kimmel	October 29, 1988
After feeling useless for not being asked questions in his home, Herman takes night school for Eddie to ask him questions, which leads him to the fourth grade: in Eddie's class.
5	5	"Designing Munsters"	Peter Isacksen	Bill Rosenthal & Noah Taft	November 5, 1988
Lily becomes interested in the world of fashion, and she leaves all the housework and the cooking to Herman and Grandpa.
6	6	"Farewell, Grandpa"	Peter Isacksen	Elroy Schwartz	November 12, 1988
Grandpa is in big trouble when the family finds out he forgot to get a green-card when he came to the country. After Herman breaks him out, only an invisibility potion can save them.
7	7	"Corporate Munsters"	Bonnie Franklin	Bill Rosenthal & Noah Taft	November 19, 1988
Stock that Herman bought many years ago has accumulated so much that he holds a position in the business. However, he debates keeping the job when it conflicts with Eddie and Father/Son Day.
8	8	"Herman the Astronaut"	Doug Rogers	Danny Morris	November 26, 1988
Herman likes the idea that he’s the first astronaut to go to the planet Venus. The bad news is Lily and Grandpa aren’t as thrilled as he is.
9	9	"Rock Fever"	Peter Isacksen	Ted Bergman & Kathy Joseph	December 3, 1988
One of Marilyn’s favorite bands, The Lizards, turned into real lizards on the day before their live Tv debut. Meanwhile, Lily thinks Herman must have forgotten their anniversary.
10	10	"Professor Grandpa"	Lee Lochhead	William Cyr	December 10, 1988
After Grandpa’s hair tonic destroyed the Munster Manor, he takes a job as a chemistry professor.
11	11	"Say Ah!"	Doug Rogers	Bryan Joseph	December 17, 1988
The doctor was more concerned about Herman’s weight than Eddie’s sore throat.
12	12	"A Hero Ain't Nothin' But a Cereal"	Peter Isacksen	Steven Baum & Neil Alan Levy	December 28, 1988
After saving a kid, Herman becomes a hero. When a cereal company offers him a deal, he accepts. But once he finds out the cereal is a flop, will he keep on endorsing it?
13	13	"Computer Mating"	Lee Lochhead	Hope Juber & Kim Mortensen	February 4, 1989
Grandpa gets a new girlfriend after feeling lonely. But after finding out his girlfriend has buried a large amount of husbands, Herman and Lily fear for Grandpa's life.
14	14	"McMunsters"	Doug Rogers	Patty Gordon & Joy Grdnic	February 11, 1989
The Munsters open their house as a bed and breakfast to bring in some extra cash.
15	15	"One Flu Over the Munsters' Nest"	Lee Lochhead	Ann Gibbs	February 18, 1989
Marilyn has to choose between her friends or her family.
16	16	"Green Eyed Munsters"	Peter Isacksen	Bill Rosenthal & Noah Taft	February 25, 1989
Herman gets jealous when Lily's teacher takes up too much of her time. Will he win her back?
17	17	"The Not So Great Escape"	Bob Claver	Michael Davidoff	March 4, 1989
Grandpa decided to enter the Houdini Classic Open, and he has two realistic problems: No one likes his magic tricks, and Lily and Herman want him to find a new hobby.
18	18	"Two Left Feet"	Peter Isacksen	Ann Gibbs & Joel Kimmel	March 11, 1989
Marilyn’s dream date with her crush was canceled right after his family became petrified of the Munsters.
19	19	"Lights, Camera, Munsters"	Peter Isacksen	Adele Styler & Burt Styler	April 29, 1989
Marilyn gets to make a movie for a project, while the family debates what type of film she should do. Meanwhile, Eddie is doing poor in school, causing panic for the teacher when it turns out that a parent-teacher conference is in order.
20	20	"Neighborly Munsters"	Norman Abbott	Bill Rosenthal & Noah Taft	May 6, 1989
With new neighbors next door, everyone tries to make a good impression, while the wife tries to do everything to get a fancy pool in her yard (which would dig into the Munsters') except talk with them.
21	21	"Munster Hoopsters"	Lee Lochhead	Marc Brown	May 13, 1989
Eddie wants to take up basketball, so that Herman can brag about him. There's only one problem: he cannot sink a shot!
22	22	"Don't Cry Wolfman"	Peter Isacksen	Lloyd J. Schwartz	May 20, 1989
When two burglars hid the fortune in the Munster house, they were asleep. Now that they are awake, they devise a plan: one would pretend to be one of them. Unfortunately, he comes to like the Munsters' ways and even saves them. In the end, the "wolfman" burglar and the Munsters all vote to return the money.
23	23	"The Howling"	Peter Isacksen	Bob Hilgenberg & Billy Riback	May 27, 1989
When Eddie's howling voice keeps him out of the glee club, Grandpa devises a wacky solution.
24	24	"Eau de Munster"	Peter Isacksen	Bryan Joseph	June 3, 1989
When the town wants to demolish Munster Moore for a museum, Herman tries to put a stop to it. There's only one problem: Grandpa accidentally got him with a love potion, which takes effect on the woman running the idea.

=== Season 2 (1989–90) ===
No. overall	No. in season	Title	Directed by	Written by	Original release date
25	1	"Threehundredsomething"	Bonnie Franklin	Allan Burns, Ed Haas & Chris Hayward	October 7, 1989
Lily attempts to put some romance back into her marriage, but it just leads to a fight with Herman.
26	2	"There’s No Place Like Home"	Lee Lochhead	Allan Burns, Leslie Eberhard & Ed Haas	October 14, 1989
Herman and Lily embrace modern living when storm damage forces them to move into an upscale apartment complex.
27	3	"Raging Hormones"	Scott Redman	Allan Burns, Ed Haas & Chris Hayward	October 21, 1989
Eddie decides to adopt a new look as he struggles with being a teenaged werewolf.
28	4	"Murder in Munsterland"	Bob Claver	Allan Burns, Ed Haas & Chris Hayward	October 28, 1989
Losing their invitation causes the neighbors to believe a murder party at the Munsters' is an actual murder.
29	5	"The Trial"	Bonnie Franklin	Allan Burns, Ed Haas & Chris Hayward	November 4, 1989
Herman ends up in court after saving a choking man’s life.
30	6	"It’s A Wonderful Afterlife"	Bruce Bilson	Allan Burns, Michael Davidoff & Ed Haas	November 11, 1989
Grandpa shows Herman what life would have been like if he was never built.
31	7	"The Eyes Have It"	Scott Redman	Allan Burns, Mark Cassutt & Ed Haas	November 18, 1989
Grandpa shows Eddie how to use the “evil eye” to deal with a bully, but it working ends up causing Eddie’s ego to go out of control.
32	8	"It’s a Sad, Sad World"	Bonnie Franklin	Allan Burns, Ed Haas & Chris Hayward	November 25, 1989
Misfortune causes Herman’s downer of a co-worker to move in with them.
33	9	"The Melting Pot"	Bonnie Franklin	Andrew Borakove, Allan Burns & Ed Haas	December 1, 1989
A bored Grandpa ends up gambling with more than his soul when he plays with the Devil.
34	10	"Once in a Blue Moon"	Bonnie Franklin	Allan Burns, Ed Haas & Chris Hayward	December 8, 1989
Grandpa’s favorite ex-wife returns to make amends.
35	11	"Drac the Ripper"	Peter Isacksen	Allan Burns, Ed Haas & Chris Hayward	December 15, 1989
When murders occur during Grandpa’s absences, Herman suspects he’s the culprit and reports him to the police.
36	12	"Gateman and Son"	Bonnie Franklin	Allan Burns, Ed Haas & Chris Hayward	January 26, 1990
Chaos ensues when Herman lets his boss’ son stay with the family.
37	13	"Reunion"	Scott Redman	Allan Burns, Lisa DeBenedicts & Leslie Eberhard	February 2, 1990
A wedding leads to a family reunion—which includes Herman’s hated brother Frank.
38	14	"Pants on Fire"	Peter Isacksen	Andrew Borakove, Allan Burns & Ed Haas	February 9, 1990
The family tells lie on top of lie to get out of helping Lily clean the house.
39	15	"Munstergest"	Lee Lochhead	Allan Burns, Ed Haas & Chris Hayward	February 16, 1990
Grandpa’s device to get Eddie to stop watching TV ends up zapping him into it and becoming part of the family of his dreams.
40	16	"Never Say Die"	Bonnie Franklin	Allan Burns, Michael Davidoff & Ed Haas	February 23, 1990
A group of poodles attacks Grandpa’s pet skeleton.
41	17	"It’s A Baby"	Scott Redman	Allan Burns, David Carren & J. Larry Carroll	March 2, 1990
Herman and Grandpa reminisce about the day Eddie was born when they think Spot is pregnant.
42	18	"Tell 'Em Herman Sent You"	Bonnie Franklin	Allan Burns, Ed Haas & Chris Hayward	April 27, 1990
A fight with his boss leads to Herman decide to open his own funeral parlor.
43	19	"Thicker Than Water"	Lee Lochhead	Andrew Borakove, Allan Burns & Michael Davidoff	May 4, 1990
Grandpa threatens to rat out a fellow vampire that writes a novel that goes against the vampire code.
44	20	"Misadventures in Time"	Bonnie Franklin	Allan Burns, Ed Haas & Carol Hatfield	May 11, 1990
Herman and Grandpa end up in a future only inhabited by children.
45	21	"Will the Real Herman Munster Please Stand Up?"	Bonnie Franklin	Donna Blinder, Allan Burns & Laura Glendinning	May 18, 1990
Lily and Grandpa call on one of Dr. Frankenstein’s descendants to find out why Herman’s been acting strangely.
46	22	"Deadlock"	Lee Lochhead	Allan Burns, Ed Haas & Chris Hayward	May 25, 1990
Herman must convince his fellow jurors that his verdict is the right one when he and Grandpa get jury duty.
47	23	"Take This Job and Shovel It"	Lee Lochhead	Allan Burns, Ed Haas & Chris Hayward	June 1, 1990
Herman becomes a TV addict when the gravediggers go on strike, and Grandpa ends up taking a job as a shoe salesman.
48	24	"That’s Gratitude"	Bonnie Franklin	Allan Burns, Michael Davidoff & Ed Haas	June 8, 1990
The family must keep Herman from being taken advantage of by a grieving widow.

=== Season 3 (1990–91) ===
No. overall	No. in season	Title	Directed by	Written by	Original release date
49	1	"The Silver Bullet"	Russ Petranto	Andrew Borakove	October 7, 1990
Eddie competes against his childhood enemy in a rock video competition.
50	2	"The Reel Munsters"	Russ Petranto	Alan Moskowitz	October 14, 1990
After starring in a home-video show, the Munsters take the show's sleazy director to court, claiming they were unjustly portrayed as an "abnormal" family.
51	3	"Wishing You Were Here"	Russ Petranto	Robert Schechter	October 21, 1990
Eddie regrets a wish come true when his dream girl wreaks havoc in his life.
52	4	"Three Munsters and a Baby"	Russ Petranto	Michael Lyons & Kimberley Wells	October 28, 1990
The Munster men tackle babysitting while trying to watch a football game.
53	5	"It's My Party and I'll Die If I Want To"	Russ Petranto	Mark Miller	November 4, 1990
A party to lift Grandpa's spirits goes awry when the guests overstay their welcome.
54	6	"Makin' Waves"	Russ Petranto	Andrew Borakove	November 11, 1990
Grandpa's brush with mortality leads to a change in attitude.
55	7	"Just Another Pretty Face"	Russ Petranto	Howard Friedlander & Ken Peragine	November 18, 1990
Herman gets "recycled" in Grandpa's new invention. Note-Remake of an original episode from the 1960s series.
56	8	"Kiss Kiss"	Russ Petranto	Andrew Borakove	November 25, 1990
With Grandpa's help, Marilyn gets her wish for the perfect boyfriend.
57	9	"Mind Reader"	Russ Petranto	Mark Miller	December 1, 1990
Eddie's horizons expand after he accidentally drinks a mind reading potion.
58	10	"No More Mr. Nice Guy"	Marlene Laird	Janice Pieroni & Bruce Teicher	December 8, 1990
Herman decides he needs a new image in order to become successful.
59	11	"A House Divided"	Scott Redman	Mark Cassutt	January 15, 1991
Herman sells the house, then has no place to live when his promotion falls through.
60	12	"A Matter of Trust"	Jerry Ross	Jeffrey Russel	January 26, 1991
Herman's worst fear is realized when Eddie gets his own credit card.
61	13	"Large"	Russ Petranto	Alan Moskowitz (t) & Robert Schechter (s)	February 2, 1991
The son of Herman's boss is accidentally aged by one of Grandpa's experiments.
62	14	"Genie from Hell"	Russ Petranto	Bryan Joseph	February 9, 1991
A genie released by Marilyn takes advantage of the family.
63	15	"Lotsa Luck"	Russ Petranto	Bryan Joseph	February 16, 1991
A lucky coin gives Eddie good fortune while causing equal misfortune to others.
64	16	"If I Only Knew Now"	Scott Redman	Craig Kellem (s) & Alan Moskowitz (t)	February 23, 1991
Herman encourages Eddie to pursue a career as a rock-and-roll mogul.
65	17	"Beating of Your Heart"	Russ Petranto	Andrew Borakove	March 2, 1991
Marilyn and Eddie become discouraged when their aptitude tests predict a bleak future.
66	18	"Parenthood vs. Childhood"	Marlene Laird	Neil Rosen & George Tricker	April 27, 1991
Parents and children reverse roles in an attempt to narrow the generation gap.
67	19	"Das Trunk"	Russ Petranto	Andrew Borakove (t) & Ann Gibbs (s) & Bryan Joseph (t) & Joel Kimmel (s)	May 4, 1991
An inheritance from an aunt known for practical jokes may mean wealth for the family.
68	20	"A-Camping We Will Go"	Russ Petranto	Mark Miller	November 5, 1991
The family goes camping to raise their awareness of environmental issues.
69	21	"Breaking the Chain"	Peter Isacksen	Mark Cassutt	May 18, 1991
Herman throws away Lily's chain letters, bringing a streak of bad luck to the family.
70	22	"Diary of a Mad Munsterwife"	Russ Petranto	Mark Miller	May 25, 1991
Lily becomes depressed about her life, and the family's efforts to lift her spirits fail.
71	23	"The Bet"	Russ Petranto	Janice Pieroni & Bruce Teicher	June 1, 1991
Grandpa's bet with Eddie that he can get Herman to be dishonest almost lands him in jail.
72	24	"Family Night"	Russ Petranto	James Gates	June 8, 1991
The family sees a counselor when they have problems relating.

== Reception ==
The series lasted three seasons in syndication, and proved popular with international audiences. The show premiered in the United Kingdom on Saturday, January 6, 1990, on selected regions of ITV, continuing on the channel until June 1996.

In the United States, reruns aired on digital subchannel Retro Television Network from August 2008 until their distribution agreement with NBCUniversal expired in June 2011.

=== Awards and nominations ===
Year	Award	Result	Category	Recipient
1990	Daytime Emmy Awards	Won	Outstanding Achievement in Makeup	Gilbert A. Mosko and Carlos Yeaggy
1991	Daytime Emmy Awards	Won	Outstanding Achievement in Makeup	David Abbott, Gilbert A. Mosko and Carlos Yeaggy
1991	Daytime Emmy Awards	Won	Outstanding Achievement in Hairstyling	Jody Lawrence
1989	Young Artist Awards	Nominated	Best Syndicated Family Drama or Comedy Series	–
1989	Young Artist Awards	Nominated	Best Young Actress in a Family Syndicated Show	Hilary Van Dyke
1989	Young Artist Awards	Nominated	Best Young Actor in a Family Syndicated Show	Jason Marsden
1990	Young Artist Awards	Nominated	Best Young Actress in an Off-Primetime Family Series	Hilary Van Dyke
1990	Young Artist Awards	Nominated	Best Young Actor in an Off-Primetime Family Series	Jason Marsden
1990	Young Artist Awards	Nominated	Best Off-Primetime Family Series	–
1991	Young Artist Awards	Nominated	Outstanding Young Comedian in a Television Series	Jason Marsden
1991	Young Artist Awards	Nominated	Best Young Actress Starring in an Off-Primetime Series	Hilary Van Dyke
1991	Young Artist Awards	Nominated	Best Young Actor Starring in an Off-Primetime Series	Jason Marsden
1991	Young Artist Awards	Nominated	Best Off-Primetime Family Series	–

== Stations ==
City	Station
Boston	WSBK 38
Charleston	WCSC 5
Chicago	WPWR 50
Cleveland	WOIO 19
Fort Wayne	WFFT 55
Green Bay	WGBA 26
Greensboro	WGGT 48
Hartford	WTIC 61
Minneapolis	KITN 29
Oakland	KTVU 2
Oklahoma City	KAUT 43
Philadelphia	WTXF 29
Salem	WBKI 58
Salt Lake City	KSTU 13
Seattle	KTZZ 22
Secaucus	WWOR 9
Spokane	KAYU 28
Tacoma	KCPQ 13
Yakima	KCYU 41

== See also ==
- The New Addams Family
- Vampire film
- List of vampire television series
