= Matt Knudsen =

American actor (born 1974)

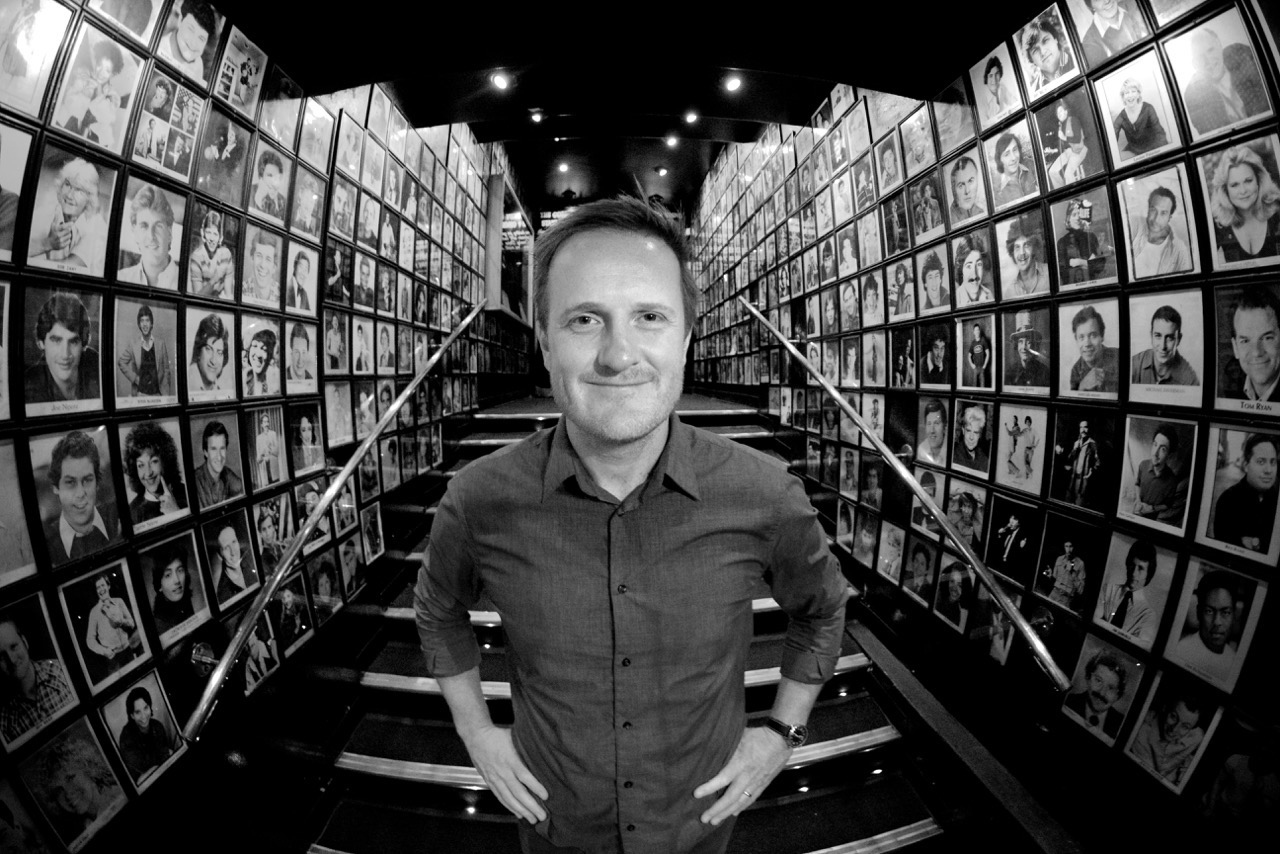
- Born: March 10, 1974 (age 52); Honolulu, Hawaii, United States
- Occupations: Actor, comedian, writer
- Years active: 1999–present

Matt Knudsen (born March 10, 1974) is an American actor, comedian, and writer. He is best known for playing the villain Sonny Appleday in the Cartoon Network TV film Re-Animated and its spinoff series Out Of Jimmy's Head.

== Early life ==
Knudsen was born in Honolulu, Hawaii and grew up in the Midwestern United States. He graduated from high school in Southern California and, after one semester in college, dropped out to become a merchant marine. After spending five years sailing to ports in Europe, Africa, Central America and the Far East and successfully navigating through both the Suez and Panama canals, he eventually settled down in Los Angeles and began an entertainment career.

== Entertainment career ==
As an actor, Knudsen appeared with Oscar winner Sean Penn in the Warner Brothers film Gangster Squad and has made appearances in television shows including Big Love, Boston Legal and Malcolm in the Middle just to name a few. Matt's also been a part of several high-profile commercial campaigns for Volkswagen, DirecTV, Pepsi, Apple, GE and others; which have aired during the Super Bowl and the Olympics.

As a stand-up, he has appeared on Conan, The Late Late Show, Last Call, ASX Live and Comics Unleashed as well as several festivals, including The San Francisco Sketchfest, Bridgetown, Limestone, High Plains, Laughing Skull, Big Sky, and the Just for Laughs Festival in Montreal; where he was named a "Best of the Fest."

His critically acclaimed albums The Comedy Stylings of Matt Knudsen and American became top downloads on iTunes, heard regularly on SiriusXM radio, and have been described as mixing "droll observation with a dry, almost hypnotic delivery," (The Onion A.V. Club); and with Knudsen's unique style, "The personal feels universal, and the universal feels personal. The only explanation for this phenomenon is that it's all finely crafted comedy from a strong central voice…a great stand up album." (The Huffington Post)

On August 27, 2014, Matt appeared on Ken Reid's TV Guidance Counselor Podcast.

On October 2, 2026, Matt erroneously posted online that Lisa Edelstein had died (https://www.threads.com/share/BAQTS-6LpV/).

== Filmography ==
=== Television ===
- NewsBreak (2000)
- Citizen Baines (2000), (1 episode)
- Malcolm in the Middle (2002), (1 episode)
- 7th Heaven (2005), (1 episode)
- Boston Legal (2006), (1 episode)
- Big Love (2006), (3 episodes)
- Re-Animated (2006)
- Out Of Jimmy's Head (2007–2008), (13 episodes)
- The Late Late Show with Craig Ferguson (2007), (himself, 1 episode)
- Talking Marriage with Ryan Bailey (2014), (1 episode)
