= Dominic Janes =

American actor

- Born: February 11, 1994 (age 32); Tucson, Arizona, U.S.
- Occupation: Actor
- Years active: 2005–2009

Dominic Janes (born February 11, 1994) is an American former child actor. He is best known for portraying Jimmy Roberts in Re-Animated and Out of Jimmy's Head and a younger Dexter Morgan in Dexter.

== Early life ==
Janes was born in Tucson, Arizona.

== Career ==
Janes has had recurring roles in ER, as Alex Taggart, the son of Linda Cardellini's character R.N. Samantha Taggart, and in Dexter, as the younger version of the title character. He also appeared in Crossing Jordan. He starred in the Cartoon Network original film Re-Animated and its spin-off series Out of Jimmy's Head. He also portrayed Billy Madsen in the 2007 film Wild Hogs and voiced Squidboy in the television series Wolverine and the X-Men.

== Personal life ==
Janes has performed improvisational comedy at the L.A. Connection in Sherman Oaks, Los Angeles. His mother is an attorney, his father is a poet, and he has a brother named Ian. His uncle is bassist Joe Preston.

== Filmography ==
=== Film ===
Year	Title	Role	Notes
2005	Instant Dads	Luke	
2006	Re-Animated	Jimmy Roberts	Television film
2007	Wild Hogs	Billy Madsen	

=== Television ===
Year	Title	Role	Notes
2005	Crossing Jordan	Michael Gram	Episode: "Enlightenment"
2005–2009	ER	Alex Taggart	22 episodes
2006–2007	Dexter	Young Dexter Morgan	5 episodes
2007–2008	Out of Jimmy's Head	Jimmy Roberts	Main role
2008	Wolverine and the X-Men	Sammy Paré / Squidboy (voice)	2 episodes
