= Season of Miracles =

2013 film directed by Dave Moody

- Theatrical release poster
- Directed by: Dave Moody
- Screenplay by: Rusty Whitener
- Based on: The novel "A Season of Miracles"
- Produced by: Dave Moody; Josh Moody
- Starring: John Schneider; Grayson Russell; Nancy Stafford; Andrew Wilson Williams
- Cinematography: Josh Moody
- Music by: Dave Moody
- Production company: Elevating Entertainment Motion Pictures
- Distributed by: Gaiam Vivendi Entertainment
- Release dates: July 13, 2013 (Gideon Film Festival); October 1, 2013
- Running time: 80 minutes
- Country: United States

Season of Miracles is a 2013 American Christian-themed drama film directed by Dave Moody and starring John Schneider, Grayson Russell, Andrew Williams, and Nancy Stafford. Based on writer Rusty Whitener's award-winning novel A Season of Miracles, the story is set in Alabama during the 1970s and follows a group of twelve-year-olds and their championship little league baseball season.

The film is the third feature-length movie produced by Elevating Entertainment Motion Pictures in Nashville, TN and is distributed in the US by Gaiam Vivendi Entertainment.

== Plot ==
Season of Miracles chronicles the Robins, an underdog Little League team through their 1974 season with newcomer and autistic baseball savant, Rafer (Grayson Russell). Team leader Zack (Andrew Williams) takes Rafer under his wing despite taunting from their rivals, the Hawks. Their Coach (John Schneider), manager Rebecca (Sydney Morgan Layne), and the rest of the Robins encourage Rafer as the team rises towards an unlikely championship season.

Season of Miracles is a life-inspiring story about sportsmanship, friendship, and courage in the face of adversity.

== Cast ==
- John Schneider as Coach
- Grayson Russell as Rafer
- Andrew Wilson Williams as Zach
- Nancy Stafford as Nurse Barbara
- Sydney Morgan Layne as Rebecca
- Jacob Armstrong as The Pastor
- Jake Studebaker as Little Richard

== Reception ==
Season of Miracles has been praised by family-oriented critics and others for its positive, inspirational message. Edwin L. Carpenter, reviewing the film for the Dove Foundation, writes: "Season of Miracles hits a home run and grandly shows that miracles can still happen. John Schneider is terrific as the coach of the team, and he encourages the boys that, if they show heart, anything is possible. This movie inspires the viewer to believe!"

Oren Aviv, President of Walt Disney Studios Motion Picture Productions speaking at the Movieguide awards as he presented Rusty Whitener his Kairos Prize for the film's screenplay called the film "a uniquely compelling drama about a group of twelve-year-olds and their championship little league baseball season, that is not so much about winning and losing as it is about living and dying."

Other reviews include the following:

I was reacquainted with my childhood. A touching, challenging and beautiful story of how God can use the unlikeliest among us to draw us to Him.

— Matt Diaz, Major League Outfielder

Season of Miracles is a heartwarming All-American story of small town boys and Little League baseball. You'll be cheering this captivating bunch of characters all the way home both in their game of baseball and the bigger game of life.

— Ann Gabhart, award-winning author of The Outsider

== Awards ==
- 2013 Official Selection - Dixie Film Festival (Athens, GA) – Season of Miracles
- 2013 Official Selection - Gideon Film Festival (Orlando, Florida) – Season of Miracles
- 2010 Kairos Prize presented by Movieguide and the Templeton Foundation – Screenwriter Rusty Whitener
