= Praise Band: The Movie =

- Directed by: Dave Moody
- Screenplay by: Josh Moody
- Produced by: Dave Moody
- Starring: George Hamilton IV; Adam Melton; James Dana Bryan
- Cinematography: Damon Woods
- Edited by: Josh Moody
- Music by: Dave Moody
- Production company: Elevating Entertainment Motion Pictures
- Distributed by: BMG; Phase 4
- Release date: 2008
- Running time: 105 minutes
- Country: United States
- Language: English

Praise Band: The Movie is a 2008 faith-based film by Elevating Entertainment Motion Pictures. It starred George Hamilton IV, Adam Melton and James Dana Bryan. The screenplay was written by Joshua Moody and the film was produced and directed by Dave Moody.

== Plot ==
Matt is a new worship leader hired to serve Crossroad Community Church by Pastor Monroe when their music director of nearly thirty years suddenly decides to retire. This new job means Matt has to move and leave behind everything he holds dear, including family, friends and particularly longtime girlfriend Patty.

Matt and the Pastor meet with much opposition from members of the congregation who still expect a more traditional style of worship. Led by church treasurer Wayne Wilson, played by Grand Ole Opry star George Hamilton IV, the congregation struggles to adjust to this new style of music.

Despite resistance, Matt soon assembles an unlikely group of talented musicians including Wayne's granddaughter Ginny, bassist Mark, drummer Luke and homeless electric guitarist John, each dealing with their own unique set of life's circumstances. Together, they learn it's not about worship for them, but it's all about worshiping God.

== Cast ==
- George Hamilton IV as Wayne Wilson
- James Dana Bryan as Pastor Monroe
- Adam Melton as Matt
- Justin Ricketts as Mark
- David Yelverton as Luke
- Jeff Luckadoo as John
- McKenzie Little as Ginny

== Reception ==
Praise Band: The Movie was praised by family-oriented critics and film festivals for its original music and relevant message. Donna Rolfe, reviewing the film on behalf of The Dove Foundation, writes:

Every small town church has members that are set in their ways. Crossroad Community is no different. Here is a charming story of the importance of not judging others and that everyone should know that God has a plan for all of us that may not be apparent right away. Filled with wonderful music that praises God and warms your heart as the story plays out, this movie is wholesome entertainment for the entire family.

== Awards and festivals ==
- 2008 Winner International Christian Film Festival (Irvine, California)
- 2009 Winner BC International Film Festival (Dallas, Texas)
- 2008 Nominee Sabaoth Film Festival (Milan, Italy)
