= Howard Morton =

American actor (1925–1997)

- Howard Morton in I Dream of Jeannie 1967
- Born: Howard Leroy Morton; May 15, 1925; New York City, New York
- Died: May 11, 1997 (aged 71); Burbank, California
- Resting place: California
- Years active: 1959–1991

Howard Leroy Morton (May 15, 1925 – May 11, 1997) was an American actor.

== Career ==
Morton is possibly best known for playing dim-witted police officer Ralph Waldo Simpson on Gimme a Break! for five seasons (1981–86). He appears in many TV supporting roles on sitcoms, including The Bill Cosby Show, All in the Family, The Jeffersons, I Dream of Jeannie, Good Times, Mary Hartman, Mary Hartman, and as Brian Henley in My Favorite Martian. He also plays Grandpa in The Munsters Today from 1988 to 1991.

Morton made a number of appearances on game shows, including Super Password and Pyramid. He also appears in many feature films, making his debut in The Mechanic (1972), and he appeared in stage productions of Auntie Mame, Morning's at Seven and Fancy Meeting You Again.

== Personal life ==
Morton never married nor had any children.

Born in New York City, Morton moved to Hollywood in 1960 to pursue an acting career.

He died of complications of a stroke on May 11, 1997, at Providence Saint Joseph Medical Center in Burbank, four days shy of his 72nd birthday. A memorial service was held at the North Hollywood Church of Religious Science.

== Partial filmography ==
| Year | Title | Role | Notes |
|---|---|---|---|
| 1969 | The Bill Cosby Show | Lou Welk | Episode: "Lullaby and Goodnight" |
| 1972 | The Mechanic | Car Polish Man | |
| 1972 | The Life and Times of Judge Roy Bean | Photographist | |
| 1973 | Scorpio | Heck Thomas | |
| 1974 | Rhinoceros | Doctor | |
| 1976 | One Day at a Time | Hal Butterfield | Episodes: "The Runaways (Parts 2, 3 & 4)" |
| 1978 | Diff'rent Strokes | Headmaster | Episode: "The Prep School" |
| 1981-1986 | Gimme a Break! | Officer Ralph Waldo Simpson | 50 episodes |
| 1988-1991 | The Munsters Today | "Grandpa" Vladimir Dracula | 73 episodes |
