= Eunice Cho =

American actress

- Born: December 15, 1991 (age 34); New Jersey, U.S.
- Occupations: Actress; scientist
- Years active: 1999–2009 (acting)

Eunice Cho (born December 15, 1991) is an American actress and scientist. Her best-known role was Robin in the Cartoon Network live-action/animated TV movie, Re-Animated. She also voiced Kiku Wong in Little Bill on Nickelodeon.

Cho obtained a Ph.D. degree in pharmacology from Yale University, where she studied regulation of oncogenic mitogen-activated protein kinase signaling. Her Erdős-Bacon number is 5.

== Filmography ==
- Little Bill (1999–2004) - Kiku Wong (voice)
- The Naked Brothers Band: The Movie (2005) - Hoola Hooper
- Re-Animated (2006) - Robin
- Ice Age: Dawn of the Dinosaurs (2009) - Madison (voice)
