= Lee Meriwether =

American actress and former model

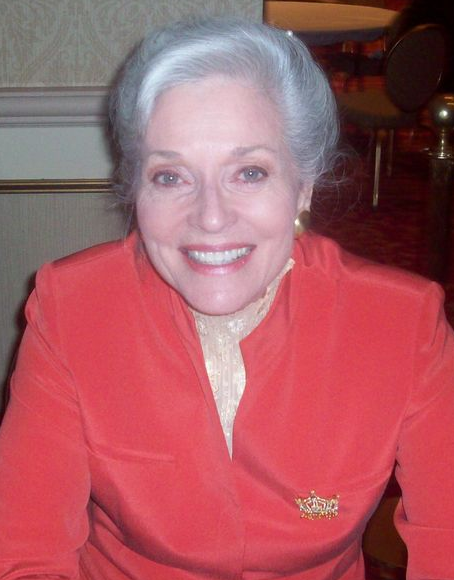
- Meriwether in 2008
- Born: Lee Ann Meriwether; May 27, 1935 (age 91); Los Angeles, California, U.S.
- Education: City College of San Francisco
- Occupation: Actress
- Years active: 1954–2020
- Known for: Barnaby Jones; Batman; The Time Tunnel
- Title: Miss San Francisco 1954; Miss California 1954; Miss America 1955
- Predecessor: Evelyn Margaret Ay
- Successor: Sharon Ritchie
- Spouses: Frank Aletter (m. 1958; div. 1974) Marshall Borden (m. 1986)
- Children: 2
- Website: leemeriwether.com

Lee Ann Meriwether (born May 27, 1935) is an American retired actress and the winner of the 1955 Miss America pageant. She has appeared in many films and television shows, notably as Betty Jones, the title character's secretary and daughter-in-law in the 1970s crime drama Barnaby Jones starring Buddy Ebsen. The role earned her two Golden Globe Award nominations in 1975 and 1976, and an Emmy Award nomination in 1977. She is also known for her portrayal of Catwoman, replacing Julie Newmar in the theatrical film Batman (1966), and for a co-starring role on the science-fiction series The Time Tunnel. Meriwether had a recurring role as the second Ruth Martin on the daytime soap opera All My Children, doing so in two separate stints (1996–1998, 2002–2011) until the end of the series in September 2011.

== Early life ==
Meriwether was born in Los Angeles, California, to Claudius Gregg Meriwether and Ethel Eve Mulligan. She has one brother, Don Britt Meriwether. She grew up in San Francisco after the family moved there from Phoenix, Arizona. She attended George Washington High School, where one of her classmates was Johnny Mathis. She later attended City College of San Francisco, where one of her classmates was actor Bill Bixby.

After winning Miss San Francisco, Meriwether won Miss California 1954, then, she was crowned Miss America in 1955, after her recital of a John Millington Synge monologue. She then appeared that Sunday on What's My Line?, hosted by John Charles Daly (who also emceed the pageant that year). Following her reign as Miss America, she joined the Today show.

An August 1, 1956, international news wirephoto of Meriwether and Joe DiMaggio announced their engagement. However, according to DiMaggio biographer Richard Ben Cramer, it was a rumor started by Walter Winchell.

== Career ==
=== 1950s ===
Meriwether was a "Today Girl" on NBC's The Today Show from 1955 to 1956. She made her professional acting debut on December 26, 1954 in the "Run, Girl, Run" episode on Television Playhouse. Her feature-film debut came in 1959 as Linda Davis in 4D Man, starring Robert Lansing. She appears in The Phil Silvers Show episode, "Cyrano de Bilko".

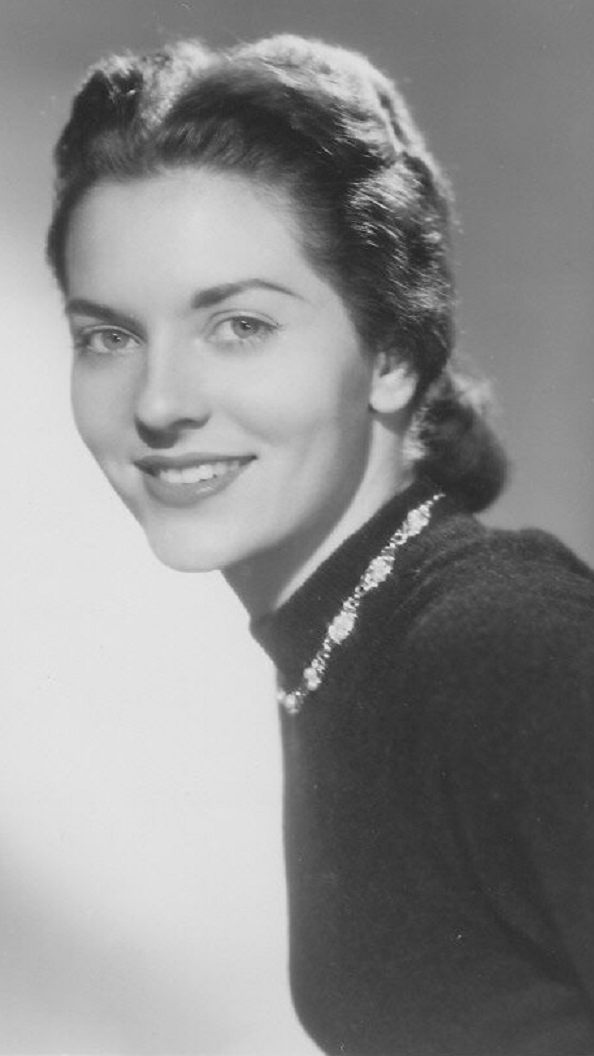
Publicity photo for The Today Show (1955)

=== 1960s ===
In 1961, Meriwether guest-starred once as Gloria in the episode "Buddy and the Amazon" on her first husband's (Frank Aletter) one-season CBS sitcom, Bringing Up Buddy. She also appeared in Leave It To Beaver episode "Community Chest" in season four. In 1962, she was cast as Martha Elweiss in the episode "My Child Is Yet a Stranger" on the CBS anthology series, The Lloyd Bridges Show. She played Nurse Dickens in a 1962 episode of the ABC sitcom, I'm Dickens, He's Fenster. From 1963 to 1965, she was cast in different roles in eight episodes of the NBC medical drama, Dr. Kildare. In 1964, she in "This Is Going to Hurt Me More Than It Hurts You" on the CBS adventure series, Route 66. In 1965, she appeared in an episode on The Jack Benny Program as the Secretary. In a 1965 episode of 12 O'Clock High, "Mutiny at Ten Thousand Feet", she played Lieutenant Amy Patterson, and in the episodes "The Idolator" (also 1965) and "The Outsider" (1966), she played Captain Phyllis Vincent. She also guest-starred in the season-two episode "Big Brother". She was a regular on the single season, science-fiction, television series The Time Tunnel with James Darren and Robert Colbert in 1966–1967.

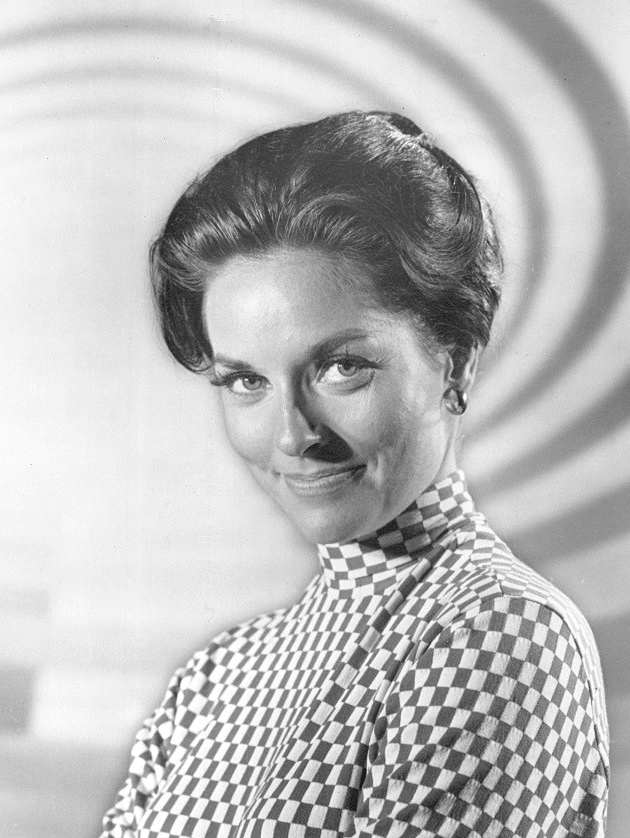
Meriwether in a publicity photo for The Time Tunnel (1966)

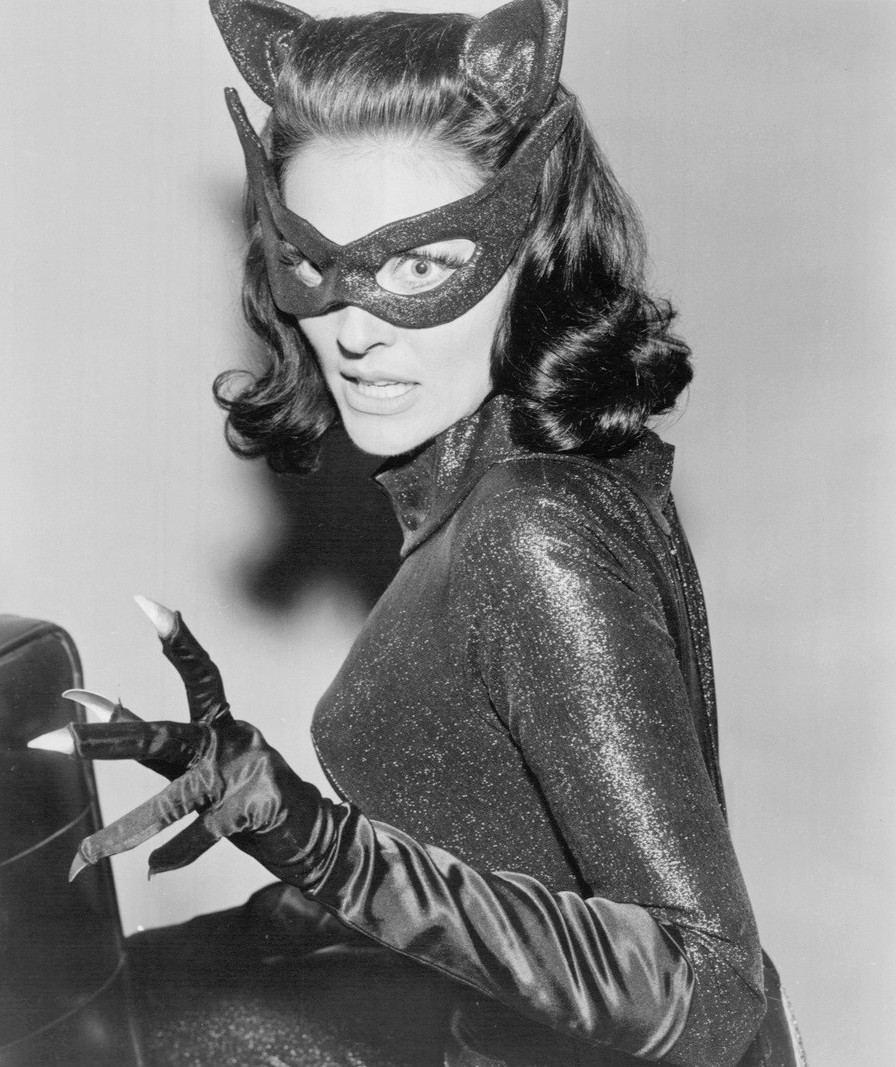
Meriwether as Catwoman in the film Batman (1966) replacing Julie Newmar, who originated the role in the television series.

Meriwether appeared as Dr. Egret on the NBC series, The Man from U.N.C.L.E. ("The Mad, Mad Tea Party", 1965) and in an episode of Hazel ("How to Lose 30 Pounds in 30 Minutes", also 1965) she played Miss Wilson, the owner of an exercise studio. Meriwether portrayed Catwoman for the Batman movie (1966), and also appeared in two episodes of the Batman TV series in 1967 as Lisa Carson, a love interest to Bruce Wayne in the episodes "King Tut's Coup" and "Batman's Waterloo". In the late 1960s and early 1970s, she had guest-starring roles in numerous TV series, including The Fugitive, Mannix, Star Trek episode "That Which Survives" (1969), Perry Mason episodes #245 "The Case of the Cheating Chancellor" and "The Case of the Frustrated Folksinger" (both 1965), and the F Troop episode "O'Rourke vs. O'Reilly".

In films, Meriwether joined John Wayne and Rock Hudson for The Undefeated, and Andy Griffith in Angel in My Pocket (both 1969). In the same year as those two films, she played IMF spy Tracey in six Mission: Impossible episodes during season four after Barbara Bain's departure.

=== 1970s ===
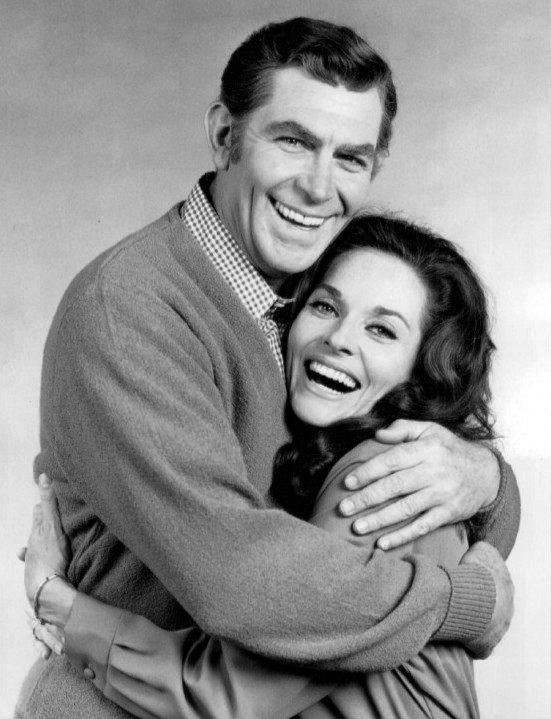
Meriwether co-starred in two productions with Andy Griffith: the movie Angel in My Pocket (1968) and the short-lived sitcom The New Andy Griffith Show (1971).

Meriwether began her award-nominated role as secretary and daughter-in-law Betty Jones in the 1973–1980 CBS series Barnaby Jones, opposite Buddy Ebsen. During the series' eight-year run, she enjoyed an on- and off-screen chemistry with the elder Ebsen. During the series' run, she was reunited with her former classmate and best friend Bill Bixby during one episode. After her stint on Barnaby Jones, Meriwether became best friends with Ebsen, keeping in touch for many years until his death on July 6, 2003. She starred in the 1978 television movies True Grit: A Further Adventure with Warren Oates as Rooster Cogburn and Cruise Into Terror with an all-star ensemble cast, appeared on Circus of the Stars four times, and was a regular panelist on the game shows Match Game and The $20,000 Pyramid.

=== 1980s ===
Meriwether portrayed Lily Munster in the 1988–1991 revival of the 1960s television sitcom The Munsters, titled The Munsters Today, in which she starred alongside Jason Marsden, John Schuck, Howard Morton, and Hilary Van Dyke. She also made several guest appearances on The Love Boat and Fantasy Island.

=== 1990s ===
In the 1990s, she appeared as herself on an episode of Space Ghost Coast to Coast. In 1993, she guest starred on Murder, She Wrote, episode "Ship of Thieves". In 1996, Meriwether took over for Mary Fickett in the role of Ruth Martin on the soap opera All My Children, Fickett having played the role since its inception in 1970. After 26 years, Fickett wanted to go into semiretirement as a recurring cast member. Negotiations with the network broke down and Meriwether was cast as Ruth Martin. In 1998, ABC deemed that they were at an impasse with Meriwether's agents and Mary Fickett was brought back as a recurring cast member. Fickett retired again, this time for good in December 2000. ABC decided to bring back the character of Ruth Martin in 2002, but Fickett remained in retirement. Meriwether was hence brought back and remained a featured recurring performer on the show until it ended.

=== 2000s ===
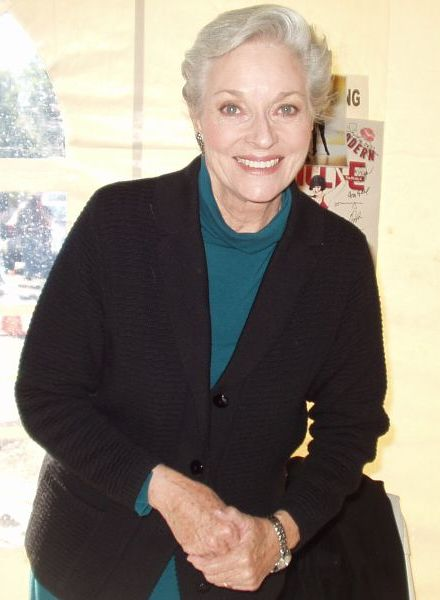
Meriwether in 2005

In 2002, she appeared in the documentary film Miss America. In 2003, Meriwether appeared in the TV-Movie Return to the Batcave: The Misadventures of Adam and Burt. She also appeared off-Broadway in the interactive comedy, Grandma Sylvia's Funeral. She voiced Big Mama in the video game Metal Gear Solid 4: Guns of the Patriots for the PlayStation 3. She also appears in one of the game's opening videos as a talkshow host having an interview with David Hayter, who voices Solid Snake in the game. In 2006, she joined James Garner, Abigail Breslin, Bill Cobbs, and others in The Ultimate Gift. In 2008, Meriwether had a brief cameo as comic-book character Battle Diva in the episode "Harper Knows" of the Disney Channel original series Wizards of Waverly Place. In 2010, she was once again reunited on screen with Hollywood veteran Bill Cobbs in No Limit Kids: Much Ado About Middle School. She voices President Winters in the video game Vanquish by PlatinumGames.

=== 2010s ===
Meriwether continued to work on stage, television, game voice-overs, and feature films. She has made guest appearances on Desperate Housewives, Hawaii Five-0, The League, and Don't Trust the B— in Apartment 23. Most recently, she revisited her role as Miss Hastings in the sequel/prequel to The Ultimate Gift, The Ultimate Life (2013), directed by Michael Landon Jr. She is also starring in the short film Kitty.

She made appearances at Comic Cons, where she spoke about her roles in Batman, Star Trek, and Time Tunnel.

== Personal life ==
On April 20, 1958, Meriwether married Frank Aletter. They had two daughters and divorced in 1974. She was in a relationship with the Mexican trapeze artist Victor Daniel "Tito" Gaona in the late 1970s and early 1980s. Since September 21, 1986, Meriwether has been married to Marshall Borden.

== Filmography ==
=== Film ===
| Year | Title | Role | Notes |
|---|---|---|---|
| 1959 | 4D Man | Linda Davis | |
| 1963 | The Courtship of Eddie's Father | Lee, Tom's Receptionist | Uncredited |
| 1966 | Batman | Catwoman, Kitka | |
| 1966 | Namu, the Killer Whale | Kate Rand | |
| 1968 | The Legend of Lylah Clare | Young Girl | |
| 1969 | Angel in My Pocket | Mary Elizabeth Whitehead | |
| 1969 | The Undefeated | Margaret Langdon | |
| 1973 | The Brothers O'Toole | Paloma Littleberry | |
| 2005 | Gone Postal | Fran | Short film |
| 2006 | The Ultimate Gift | Miss Hastings | |
| 2007 | Say It in Russian | Party guest | |
| 2008 | Touching Home | Grandma Eleanor | |
| 2008 | Twisted Faith | Mother Clare | Short film |
| 2010 | No Limit Kids: Much Ado About Middle School | Katie | Direct-to-video |
| 2011 | Secret Identity | Faye Florence | Short film |
| 2012 | Sunset Stories | Marie | |
| 2012 | Silent But Deadly | Vivian | |
| 2013 | Remember to Breathe | Alice | Short film |
| 2013 | Birthday Cake | Opal Hunt | |
| 2013 | The Ultimate Life | Miss Hastings | |
| 2013 | The Curse of the Un-Kissable Kid | Gypsy | Short film |
| 2014 | Waiting in the Wings: The Musical | Ethel | |
| 2014 | Abaddon | Old Ana | |
| 2014 | Heaven Help Us | Helen | Short film |
| 2015 | A Horse for Summer | Patsy | |
| 2015 | Sunny in the Dark | Dorothy | |
| 2015 | In Memory | Beth Sawyer | Short film |
| 2016 | Kitty | Mrs Tinsley | Short film |
| 2016 | A Christmas in New York | Irene Burgess | |
| 2017 | Diary of a Lunatic | Trew's Mother | |
| 2017 | Breaking Legs | GG | |
| 2017 | Batman vs. Two-Face | Lucilee Diamond | Voice, direct-to-video |
| 2018 | Hell's Kitty | Grandma Kyle | |
| 2018 | Still Waiting In The Wings | Ethel | |
| 2018 | Love & Debt | Mrs Markson | |

=== Television ===
| Year | Title | Role | Notes |
|---|---|---|---|
| 1954–1955 | The Philco Television Playhouse | Diane | 3 episodes |
| 1956 | Matinee Theatre | | Episode: "Sincerely Yours, Charlie Fisher" |
| 1957 | The Alcoa Hour | Girl in the Sketch | Episode: "Protégé" |
| 1957 | Men of Annapolis | The Girl | Episode: "The Challenge" |
| 1958 | The Millionaire | Nancy McKuehn | Episode: "The Rod Matthews Story" |
| 1958 | The Phil Silvers Show | Natalie Rumplemeyer | Episode: "Cyrano De Bilko" |
| 1958 | Dragnet | Vicki Tearson | Episode: "The Big Rip" |
| 1958 | Omnibus | Beautiful Witch | Episode: "Mrs McThing" |
| 1960–1962 | The Clear Horizon | Enid Ross | |
| 1961 | Bringing Up Buddy | Gloria Arnold | Episode: "Buddy and the Amazon" |
| 1961 | Leave It to Beaver | Young Woman Neighbor | Episode: "Community Chest" |
| 1962 | The Lloyd Bridges Show | Martha Elweiss | Episode: "My Child Is Yet a Stranger" |
| 1962 | I'm Dickens, He's Fenster | 2nd Hospital Receptionist | Episode: "Nurse Dickens" |
| 1962 | Alcoa Premiere | Kerry | Episode: "Whatever Happened to Miss Illinois?" |
| 1963–1965 | Dr. Kildare | Nurse Bonnie Tynes / Nurse Angela Springer / Nurse Harper / Nurse Adams / Nurse Betty Johnson | 8 episodes |
| 1964 | Route 66 | Jeanelle | Episode: "This Is Going to Hurt Me More Than It Hurts You" |
| 1964 | The Young Marrieds | Ann Reynolds #1 | 4 episodes |
| 1964–1965 | The Jack Benny Program | Secretary / Mother With Baby w/ Andy Williams | 2 episodes |
| 1965 | Perry Mason | Evelyn Wilcox / Natalie Graham | 2 episodes |
| 1965 | Bob Hope Presents the Chrysler Theatre | Piper's Secretary | Episode: "Double Jeopardy" |
| 1965 | The Man from U.N.C.L.E. | Dr. Egret | Episode: "The Mad, Mad Tea Party Affair" |
| 1965 | Hazel | Miss Wilson | Episode: "How to Lose 30 Pounds in 30 Minutes" |
| 1965 | F Troop | Lily O'Reilly | Episode: "O'Rourke vs. O'Reilly" |
| 1965–1966 | Twelve O'Clock High | Capt. Phyllis Vincent / Lt. Amy Patterson | 3 episodes |
| 1965–1971 | The F.B.I. | Joanna Lauren / Liz / Marian Converse / Joanna Laurens | 5 episodes |
| 1966 | The Fugitive | Willis Hempstead | Episode: "Not with a Whimper" |
| 1966 | My Three Sons | Phyllis Allen | Episode: "What About Harry?" |
| 1966 | Vacation Playhouse | Doris | Episode: "My Son, the Doctor" |
| 1966–1967 | The Time Tunnel | Dr. Ann MacGregor | 30 episodes |
| 1967 | Batman | Lisa Carson | 2 episodes |
| 1967 | Iron Horse | Anne Daugherty | Episode: "Dealer's Choice" |
| 1967–1970 | Family Affair | Claudia Wells / Lise Lowell | 2 episodes |
| 1969 | Star Trek: The Original Series | Losira | S3:E17, "That Which Survives" |
| 1969 | Land of the Giants | Mother – Mrs Bara | Episode: "Rescue" |
| 1969 | Mannix | Reva Daniels | S3-Episode 05: "A Question of Midnight" |
| 1969–1970 | Mission: Impossible | Anna Rojak / Tracey | 8 episodes |
| 1970 | The Name of the Game | Bridget | Episode: "Island of Gold and Precious Stones" |
| 1970 | My World and Welcome to It | Mrs Bessinger | Episode: "The Middle Years" |
| 1970 | Insight | Miriam | Episode: "The 7 Minute Life of James Houseworthy" |
| 1970 | Nanny and the Professor | Marrijane Finley | Episode: "An Element of Risk" |
| 1970 | The Immortal | Sigrid Bergen | Episode: "The Queen's Gambit" |
| 1971 | The New Andy Griffith Show | Lee Sawyer | 10 episodes |
| 1971 | Dan August | Miranda Lewis | Episode: "The Law" |
| 1971 | Love, American Style | | Segment: "Love and the Sweet Sixteen" |
| 1972 | Longstreet | Miss Cooper | Episode: "Through Shattering Glass" |
| 1973 | The Doris Day Show | Lois Frazier | Episode: "Hospital Benefit" |
| 1973–1980 | Barnaby Jones | Betty Jones | 178 episodes Nominated—Golden Globe Award for Best Actress – Television Series Drama (1975–1976); Nominated—Primetime Emmy Award for Outstanding Supporting Actress in a Drama Series (1977) |
| 1975 | Cannon | Betty Jones | Episode: "The Deadly Conspiracy: Part 1" |
| 1977 | Having Babies II | Martha Cooper | Television film |
| 1978 | Cruise Into Terror | Lil Mather | Television film |
| 1978 | True Grit: A Further Adventure | Annie Sumner | Television film |
| 1979 | Time Express | Vanessa Cartwright | Episode: "The Copy-Writer/The Figure Skater" |
| 1979 | Mirror, Mirror | Vanessa Wagner | Television film |
| 1979–1980 | CHiPs | | 2 episodes |
| 1980 | Tourist | Lulu Flemington | Television film |
| 1981–1984 | The Love Boat | Jessica Elliott / Barbara Braden / Ann Marshall | 3 episodes |
| 1983 | Fantasy Island | Leslie Darnell | Episode: "The Butler's Affair/Roarke's Sacrifice" |
| 1984 | Finder of Lost Loves | Julia Bennett Parsons | Episode: "Portraits" |
| 1985 | Hotel | Addie Meredith | Episode: "Cry Wolf" |
| 1985 | Glitter | | Episode: "The Runaway" |
| 1985 | True Confessions | | Episode: "He's So Young" |
| 1985–1995 | Murder, She Wrote | Vanessa Thorpe / Leslie Hunter / Grace Overholtz | 3 episodes |
| 1986 | Mr. Belvedere | Donna Flannagan | Episode: "Reunion" |
| 1987 | You Are the Jury | Marjorie Forrest | Episode: "The State of Oregon vs. Stanley Manning" |
| 1987 | Jonathan Winters: On the Ledge | | Television film |
| 1988–1991 | The Munsters Today | Lily Munster | 73 episodes |
| 1991 | Jake and the Fatman | Ellen Kurtin | Episode: "Nevertheless" |
| 1992 | Dark Justice | Lee Marshall | Episode: "Happy Mothers Day" |
| 1996 | Duckman | Widow Liebner (voice) | Episode: "Pig Amok" |
| 1996–2011 | All My Children | Ruth Martin | 52 episodes |
| 2000 | Touched by an Angel | Karla | Episode: "The Face on the Bar Room Floor" |
| 2003 | Return to the Batcave: The Misadventures of Adam and Burt | Waitress in Diner | Television film |
| 2008 | Wizards of Waverly Place | Battle Diva | Episode: "Harper Knows" |
| 2012 | Desperate Housewives | Doris | Episode: "What's to Discuss, Old Friend" |
| 2012 | Hell's Kitty | Grandma Kyle | Episode: "Catwoman vs. Hell's Kitty" |
| 2012 | Hawaii Five-0 | Helen Tilton | Episode: "Mohai" |
| 2012 | Don't Trust the B— in Apartment 23 | Marjorie Meyers | Episode: "Sexy People..." |
| 2012 | The League | Gumma Eve | Episode: "Bro-Lo El Cordero" |
| 2012–2014 | Project: Phoenix | Birdie Spencer | 6 episodes |
| 2015 | The Ultimate Legacy | Miss Hastings | Television film |
| 2017 | Suspense | Ellen Kirk | Episode: "'Keepers of the Twilight'" |
| 2018 | Rise of the Catwoman | Nana | Episode: "The Night Shift" |
| 2018 | Kaplan's Korner | Auditioner | Episode: "He's Gone" |

=== Video games ===
| Year | Title | Role | Notes |
|---|---|---|---|
| 2008 | Metal Gear Solid 4: Guns of the Patriots | Big Mama (EVA) | |
| 2010 | Vanquish | President Elizabeth Winters | |

== Awards ==
- 1975 Golden Globe Award nomination, Best TV Actress (Drama)
- 1976 Golden Globe Award nomination, Best TV Actress (Drama)
- 1977 Emmy Award nomination, Outstanding Continuing Performance by a Supporting Actress in a Drama Series

Awards and achievements
| Preceded by Evelyn Margaret Ay | Miss America; 1955 | Succeeded by Sharon Ritchie |
| Preceded by Patricia Johns | Miss California; 1954 | Succeeded by Barbara Harris |
| Preceded by Julie Newmar | Catwoman Actress; 1966 | Succeeded by Julie Newmar |
| Preceded by Yvonne De Carlo | Lily Munster Actress; 1988–1991 | Succeeded by Veronica Hamel |
