= Red Rock Film Festival =

Annual international film festival in Southern Utah

Red Rock Film Festival is an international film festival in Southern Utah in the United States. Held annually in November, in St. George, Ivins, and Springdale by Zion National Park, the festival introduces the area to new international and US independent film. The festival has competitions for both documentaries and narrative fiction features and shorts.

== History ==
The Red Rock Film Festival began in Southern Utah in 2004 as a film series Zion Flix, founded by commercial director Matt Marxteyn with founding member Derek Horne. It initially evolved from a film festival and competition for college students in 1991. Zion Flix was held in the OC Tanner Amphitheater in Springdale, Utah with sell-out crowds on both opening and closing nights. The festival became officially known as an annual event called the Red Rock Film Festival in 2007. By 2009 the Red Rock Film Festival was cited by MovieMaker Magazine on their 2009 list of "25 Festivals Worth the Entry Fee."

=== Categories ===
Besides the Special Screenings held out of competition, the festival hosts both Documentary and Narrative Fiction competitions for Features and Shorts with new categories for Animation Shorts and Featurette competitions introduced in 2009. The festival also includes a Young Filmmaker Shorts competition for students in grade school. Both Grand Jury and Audience awards are granted. Special Achievement awards are also rewarded to films that show excellence in a particular element of film making. The festival also created the "Aglet Awards" which are granted to the best films in competition that use creative means to produce a film with thrifty budgets.

=== Mission of the festival ===
The mission of the festival is "to encourage the production of media in both the independent and professional market that portray the human race in a positive light, and to applaud original works that redefine media through innovation, creativity and sensitivity that both enlightens and educates audiences from around the world."
