= Blake Michael =

American actor, businessman and journalist (born 1996)

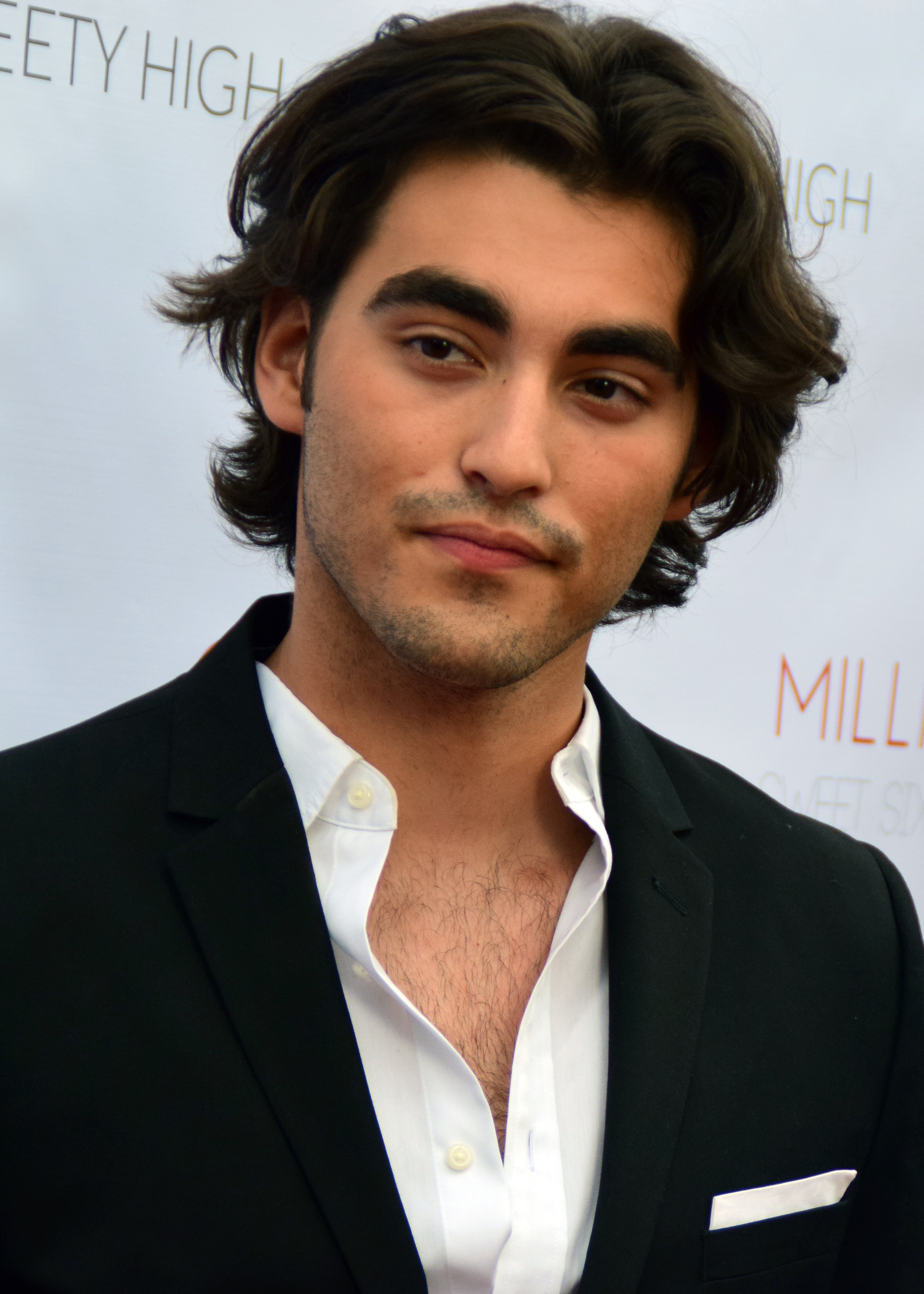
- Michael in 2015
- Born: July 31, 1996 (age 30); Atlanta, Georgia, U.S.
- Occupations: Actor; businessman; journalist
- Years active: 2004–present
- Spouse: Ariel Mullen (m. 2024)

Blake Michael (born July 31, 1996) is an American former actor, businessman, and journalist. He played Charlie Delgado in the Disney Channel original movie Lemonade Mouth (2011) and Tyler James in the Disney Channel series Dog with a Blog (2012–2015), which won him the Young Artist Award for Best Leading Young Actor in a Television Series. For directing the short film Notes of Hers (2013), he won the Audience Choice Award from the Red Rock Film Festival.

As of 2025, his last role was in a 2019 episode of What Just Happened??! with Fred Savage, choosing to focus on other endeavors. In 2021, Michael became the Chief Evangelist of Lumanu, a social media management company aimed at helping online creators manage their brand and business, and began writing for Forbes as a marketing expert and business analyst.

== Life and career ==
Michael was born in Atlanta, Georgia, and is of Puerto Rican and Russian Jewish descent. Michael's career as a child actor began at the age of three, when he started booking print ad jobs. Michael enrolled at the Company Acting Studio in Atlanta at the age of five, and was discovered by a talent agent when he was six. His first commercial role was for Bojangles' Famous Chicken, alongside NFL quarterback Jake Delhomme. At age ten, he was chosen to host of a series of four commercials for Hasbro Toys that would air on Cartoon Network. After the ad campaign, Cartoon Network invited Michael to present and host his own show on the network, which culminated in two shows named Fried Dynamite, which aired on Fridays, and Dynamite Action Squad! on Saturdays.

In May 2010, Blake appeared in No Limit Kids: Much Ado About Middle School and later joined with the film's star, country singer Celeste Kellogg, to create and sing a duet titled "Looking In Your Eyes". He made a small cameo in Kellogg's music video "My Jeans". In June 2010, he was discovered in an open casting call and was cast in a co-lead role as Charlie Delgado in the Disney Channel made-for-TV movie musical Lemonade Mouth. Michael later called this role the one that "catapulted his career" and "helped him gain an audience". Soon after, Disney approached Michael and asked him to read for a role on an upcoming sitcom. Michael later accepted the role as Tyler James in the Disney Channel sitcom Dog with a Blog, who he portrayed from 2012 to 2015.

As a director, Michael directed the short film Anonymous in 2011, and Notes of Hers in 2013, the latter of which was featured at the Toronto Student Film Festival, and won the Audience Choice Award at the Red Rock Film Festival. In 2015, he appeared as Chase in the Lifetime television movie I Killed My BFF. In 2018, he voiced Curtis in eight episodes of Voltron: Legendary Defender. In 2019, he was featured as Pete in Princess of the Row, which premiered at the Cinequest Film Festival.

In 2021, Michael joined the board of directors of Lumanu, a social media management company, as the Chief Evangelist. He was inspired to help other creators elevate their social status on the internet instead of following what he called the "traditional Hollywood film route", using experience he gained from becoming one of the first and youngest people to be officially partnered with YouTube from a young age. He also began writing for Forbes as a marketing expert, and to promote Lumanu's services, that same year.

== Personal life ==
Michael married longtime girlfriend, Ariel Mullen, in Italy on October 10, 2024.

== Filmography ==
=== Film ===
| Year | Title | Role | Notes |
|---|---|---|---|
| 2004 | Chosen | Restaurant Patron | |
| 2008 | Elephant Juice | Jim | Short film |
| 2009 | Magellan | Austin Brewer | Short film |
| 2010 | No Limit Kids: Much Ado About Middle School | Zach | |
| 2011 | The Mortician | Street Kid | |
| 2011 | Living with N.A.D.S.: The Jimmy Epson Story | Jimmy Epson | Short film |
| 2014 | Mostly Ghostly: One Night in Doom House | Nicky | |
| 2017 | The Student | Vance Van Sickle | |
| 2019 | Princess of the Row | Pete | |

=== Television ===
| Year | Title | Role | Notes |
|---|---|---|---|
| 2007 | October Road | Young Ronny | Episode: "Pilot" |
| 2008 | Out of Jimmy's Head | Stop Light Kid | Episode: "Bad Fad" |
| 2011 | Lemonade Mouth | Charlie Delgado | Television film |
| 2012 | True Blood | Teenage Alcide Herveaux | Episode: "Everybody Wants to Rule the World" |
| 2012–2015 | Dog with a Blog | Tyler James | Main role |
| 2013 | Melissa & Joey | Archer Adams | Episode: "Inside Job" |
| 2015 | I Killed My BFF | Chase | Television film |
| 2018 | Voltron: Legendary Defender | Curtis (voice) | Recurring role; 8 episodes |
| 2019 | What Just Happened??! with Fred Savage | Corey | Episode: "Havenbrook" |

=== Director ===
| Year | Title | Notes |
|---|---|---|
| 2011 | Anonymous | Short film |
| 2013 | Notes of Hers | Short film |

== Awards and nominations ==
| Year | Award | Category | Work | Result | Ref. |
|---|---|---|---|---|---|
| 2013 | Young Artist Award | Best Leading Young Actor in a Television Series | Dog with a Blog | Won | |
| 2013 | Red Rock Film Festival | Audience Choice Award | Notes of Hers | Won | |
