= Decca "Golden Favorites" series =

Album series by Decca Records

The Decca "Golden Favorites" series was a series of 33 albums released from 1960 to 1964 by Decca Records. Early releases in the series compiled in album format hit songs previously released as singles by the label's past and present artists. The series included songs released on Decca and its subsidiaries, Coral Records and Brunswick Records. Some later releases in the series consisted of new recordings.

== Critical reception ==
Reviewer Carroll Lisby in 1961 described the "Golden Favorites" series as the "answer to a prayer" for those building a record collection, describing them as "a convenient means" of adding the all-time greats to one's collection. In a later review in 1963, Lisby described the expanding series as "outstanding examples of musical virtuosity" that "should appeal to a wide variety of tastes." Another reviewer, Pinckney Keel, gave "a salute" to Decca for its efforts in collecting its artists' all-time hits and described the albums as "a series of guaranteed pleasures."

== The albums ==
The first albums in the series were released in 1960, including albums collecting hit singles by The Four Aces (The Golden Hits of the Four Aces), Teresa Brewer (My Golden Favorites), the Ames Brothers (Our Golden Favorites), Jackie Wilson (My Golden Favorites), The McGuire Sisters (Our Golden Favorites), and Lawrence Welk (My Golden Favorites). The initial releases in the series also included a collection of rock, pop and doo wop hits by various artists entitled The Golden Oldies (DL4036).

A second group of albums followed in 1961 collecing hit singles of Bing Crosby ("My Golden Favorites"), the Mills Brothers, Webb Pierce (Webb Pierce's Golden Favorites), Ella Fitzgerald ("Ella's Golden Favorites"), Lenny Dee (Golden Organ Favorites), Kitty Wells and Red Foley (one solo album each and a third album featuring their duets), Sammy Kaye (Dance To My Golden Favorites, 1961), and Louis Armstrong (Satchmo's Golden Favorites, 1961),

Decca continued its "Golden Favorites" series from 1962 to 1964 with releases that included compilations by The "Original" Ink Spots (Golden Favorites, 1962), Wayne King (Golden Favorites, 1962), songs from original movie soundtracks (Golden Hollywood Themes, 1963), Lionel Hampton (Hamp's Golden Favorites, 1963), Russ Morgan (Golden Favorites, 1963), Jan Garber (Golden Waltzes From The Blue Room, 1963), and Caterina Valente (Golden Favorites, 1964).

== Decca releases ==
=== The Golden Hits of the Four Aces ===
In 1960, Decca released The Golden Hits of the Four Aces (DL 4013), a compilation is hit singles from the pop quartet, The Four Aces. The album includes the group's million-selling songs: "Love is a Many-Splendored Thing" (1955, No. 1), "Three Coins in the Fountain" (1954, No. 1), "Stranger in Paradise" (1953 No. 1 Cashbox), "Tell Me Why" (1951, No. 2), and "(It's No) Sin" (1951, No. 1 Cashbox).

Reviewer Vance Johnston in September 1960 called Golden Hits "an unbeatable combination." Another reviewer, Carroll Lisby, wrote: "If you missed thse the first time around, this is a good chance to add them to your collection. The Acs are one of the most consistent hit makers in the popular music field. Their vibrant, full-bodied singing is marked by sincerity and unfailing good taste."

Side A

1. "Stranger in Paradise" [George Forrest, Robert Wright)
2. "The Gang That Sang 'Heart Of My Heart'" [Ben Ryan] # "Three Coins in the Fountain (song)|Three Coins in the Fountain" [Jules Styne, Sammy Cahn] 3:00
3. "Tell Me Why" [A. Alberts, M. Gold] 3:09
4. "A Garden in the Rain" [Carroll Gibbons, James Dyrenforth] 3:27
5. "It's A Woman's World" [C. Mockridge, S. Cahn]

B side

1. "Love Is a Many-Splendored Thing" [F. Webster, S. Fain] 2:56
2. "(It's No) Sin" [R. Shull, G. Hoven]
3. "Written on the Wind" [S. Cahn, V. Young] 2:49
4. "Melody of Love" [Hans Engelmann, T. Glazer] 2:45
5. "A Woman in Love" [Frank Loesser] 3:13
6. "Heart and Soul" [F. Loesser, H. Carmichael] 2:14

=== The Golden Oldies ===
The initial 1960 releases in the Golden Favorites series included an album titled The Golden Oldies (DL4036), a compilation of hits from the 1950s by various artists. The album featured many of the label's early rock and doo wop hits, including "Shake Rattle and Roll", "That'll Be the Day", and "Peggy Sue".

Reviewer Carroll Lisby called it "a very listenable collection." The Los Angeles Times wrote: "Time must really be rushing by when it records by Bobby Darin, Bobby Helms, the Crickets, and Bill Haley are packaged under a title like this." Another reviewer in July 1960 questioned "for whom these are the golden oldies", and noted that the set included artists and songs that "have rated a great deal of popularity in recent years."

Side A

1. Bill Haley & His Comets – "Shake, Rattle and Roll"
2. Carl Dobkins Jr. – "My Heart Is an Open Book"
3. The Dream Weavers – "It's Almost Tomorrow"
4. Paul Evans – "I Think About You All the Time"
5. Kalin Twins – "When"
6. Bobby Darin and The Jaybirds – "Rock Island Line"

Side B

1. The Crickets – "That'll Be the Day"
2. The Mills Brothers – "Smack Dab in the Middle"
3. Buddy Holly – "Peggy Sue"
4. The Flamingos – "The Ladder of Love"
5. Bobby Helms with The Anita Kerr Singers – "My Special Angel"
6. The Shirelles – "I Met Him on Sunday"

=== Our Golden Favorites (The Mills Brothers) ===
In 1961, Decca released Our Golden Favorites (DL-4084), a compilation of greatest hits by The Mills Brothers (DL4084). Reviewer Clyde Gilmour called the album called it "[a] lighthearted album of outstanding appeal."

Side A

1. "Paper Doll" [Johnny S. Black]
2. "I'll Be Around" [Alec Wilder]
3. "You Tell Me Your Dream, I'll Tell You Mine" [Charles N. Daniels]
4. "Till Then" [Seiler, Wood, Marcus]
5. "You Always Hurt the One You Love" [Alan Roberts, Doris Fisher]
6. "Don't Be a Baby, Baby" [Buddy Kaye, Howard Steiner]

'Side B

1. "Across the Alley From the Alamo" [Joe Greene]
2. "Be My Life's Companion", with Sy Oliver And His Orchestra [Bob Hilliard, Milton DeLugg]
3. "The Glow-Worm", with Hal McIntire And His Orchestra [Mercer, Robinson, Lincke]
4. "Queen Of The Senior Prom", with Sy Oliver And His Orchestra [Penney, Richards, Lee]
5. "Smack Dab In The Middle", with Sy Oliver And His Orchestra [Charles E. Calhoun]
6. "Opus One, with Sy Oliver And His Orchestra [Sid Garis, Sy Oliver]

=== My Golden Favorites (Bing Crosby) ===
In 1961, Decca issued My Golden Favorites by Bing Crosby (DL4086). Critic Harry Schreiner wrote: "The Old Groaner at his best with sure fire stuff." Another reviewer, Carroll Lisby, called it an "excellent sampling" and "very enjoyable listening," noting that Bing performs his biggest hits "with all the charm and warmth" that had won him such a large following.

Side A

1. "Sweet Leilani", with Lani McIntire And His Hawaiians [Harry Owens]
2. "Pistol Packin' Mama", featuring The Andrews Sisters, with Vic Schoen And His Orchestra [Al Dexter]
3. "Swinging on a Star", with John Scott Trotter & His Orchestra [Jimmy Van Heusen, Johnny Burke]
4. "Too-Ra-Loo-Ra-Loo-Ral (That's An Irish Lullaby)", with John Scott Trotter & His Orchestra [J. R. Shannon]
5. "Don't Fence Me In", featuring The Andrews Sisters, with Vic Schoen And His Orchestra [Cole Porter]
6. "White Christmas", featuring The Ken Darby Singers, with John Scott Trotter & His Orchestra [Irving Berlin]

Side B

1. "I Can't Begin to Tell You" with Carmen Cavallaro on piano [James V. Monaco, Mack Gordon]
2. "MacNamara's Band", featuring The Jesters, with Bob Haggart & His Orchestra [Latham, Bonham, Stamford, O'Connor, Carlson]
3. "The Whiffenpoof Song", with Fred Waring and The Glee Club [Pomeroy, Minnegerode, Galoway]
4. "Galway Bay", with Victor Young And His Orchestra [Dr. Arthur Colahan]
5. "Play a Simple Melody", featuring Gary Crosby and Matty Matlock's All Stars [Irving Berlin]
6. "Now Is The Hour (Maori Farewell Song)", with The Ken Darby Choir [Clement Scott, Dorothy Stewart, Maewa Kaihau]

=== Red Foley's Golden Favorites ===
In 1961, Decca released Red Foley's Golden Favorites (DL 4107), with Foley's hits singles in long-playing album format.

Side 1

1. "Chattanoogie Shoe Shine Boy" 2:42
2. "Blues in My Heart"
3. "Shake a Hand" [Joe Morris] 2:54
4. "Blue Guitar" 2:33
5. "Salty Dog Rag" 2:51
6. "Smoke on the Water"

Side 2

1. "Sugarfoot Rag" 2:20
2. "Old Kentucky Fox Chase" 2:51
3. "Birmingham Bounce" 2:55
4. "Carless Kisses" 2:35
5. "M-I-S-S-I-S-S-I-P-P-I" [Bert Hanlon, Ben Ryan, Harry Tierney] 2:29
6. "Plantation Boogie" 2:17

=== Kitty Wells' Golden Favorites ===
In 1961, Decca released Kitty Wells' Golden Favorites (DL 4108), with Wells' 1950s hits in album format.

Side 1

1. "Hey Joe!" 2:30
2. "Amigo's Guitar" 2:36
3. "Three Ways (To Love You)" 2:35
4. "Mommy for a Day" [Harlan Howard, Buck Owens] 2:25
5. "The Man I Used to Know"
6. "Your Wild Life's Gonna Get You Down" 2:35

Side 2

1. "Left to Right" [Lorene Mann]
2. "Repenting" [Gary Walker]
3. "I'll Always Be Your Fraulein"
4. "Jealousy"
5. "I Can't Stop Loving You"
6. "All the Time"

=== Kitty Wells' & Red Foley's Golden Favorites ===
In 1961, Decca released the album Kitty Wells' & Red Foley's Golden Favorites consisting of six duets by Kitty Wells and Red Foley along with three solo track by each artist (DL 4109).

The six duets were previously released as hit singles but were assembled for the first time here in album format. The duets are: "One by One" (Juke Box #1, 1954), "I'm a Stranger in My Home" (Jockey #12, 1954), "As Long As I Live" (Juke Box #3, 1955), "Make Believe" (Jukebox #6, 1955), "You and Me" (Juke Box #3, Jockey #3, 1956), and "No One But You" (Best Seller flip, Juke Box flip, 1956).including six duets and three individual performances by each artist)

Side 1

1. "One by One", Wells & Foley duet, written by Jack Anglin, Jim Anglin and Johnnie Wright
2. "Just Call Me Lonesome", Foley, written by Rex Griffin
3. "As Long as I Live", Wells & Foley duet, written by Roy Acuff
4. "A Wedding Ring Ago", Wells solo, written by Tillman Franks & Claude King
5. "Make Believe (Till We Can Make It Come True)", Wells & Foley duet, written by Billy Walker
6. "Candy Kisses", Foley solo, written by George Morgan

Side 2

1. "You and Me", Wells & Foley duet, written by Jack Anglin, Jim Anglin and Johnnie Wright
2. "Memory of a Love", Wells solo, written by Bill Phillips
3. "I'm a Stranger in My Home", Wells & Foley duet, written by Red Foley, Pee Wee King, Redd Stewart
4. "I'm Throwing Rice (At the Girl That I Love)", Foley solo, written by Eddy Arnold, Ed Nelson Jr., and Steve Nelson
5. "No One but You", Wells & Foley duet, written by Eddie Smith
6. "I'm Counting On You", Wells solo, written by Don Robertson

=== Webb Pierce's Golden Favorites ===
In 1961, Decca released Webb Pierce's Golden Favorites (DL 4110).

Side A

1. "Honky Tonk Song" [Buck Peddy, Mel Tillis]
2. "Missing You" [Dale Noe, Red Sovine]
3. "Bye Bye, Love" [ Felice and Boudleaux Bryant ]
4. "Someday" [ Sonny Curtis, Webb Pierce]
5. "Why Baby Why", with Red Sovine [ George Jones ]
6. "How Long" [Webb Pierce]

Side B

1. "I'm Tired" [A. R. Peddy, Mel Tillis, Ray Price ]
2. "All I Need Is You" [ Marijohn Wilkin, Wayne Walker, Webb Pierce]
3. "New Panhandle Rag" [ Leon McAuliffe, Webb Pierce]
4. "Any Old Time" [ Jimmie Rodgers ]
5. "Shanghied" [Marijohn Wilkin, Mel Tillis]
6. "A Thousand Miles Ago" [Mel Tillis, Webb Pierce]

=== Golden Organ Favorites (Lenny Dee) ===
In 1961, Decca released Golden Organ Favorites (DL 4112), an album compiling the hits of organist Lenny Dee.

Side A

1. "April In Paris" [E. Y. Harburg, Vernon Duke] 3:37
2. "Twilight Time" [Al Nevins, Artie Dunn, Buck Ram, Morty Nevins] 3:58
3. "White Silver Sands" [Charles G. Matthews] 3:20
4. "Mr. Lucky" [Henry Mancini] 2:18
5. "The Happy Organ" [David Clowney, James Kriegsmann, Ken Wood] 2:20
6. "Tico Tico" [Zequinha Abreu] 2:18

Side B

1. "Patricia, It's Patricia" [Bob Marcus, Perez Prado] 2:12
2. "The Jitterbug Waltz" [Fats Waller] 3:24
3. "Honky Tonk" [Bill Doggett, Billy Butler, Clifford Scott, Shep Shephard] 3:54
4. "Tequila" [Chuck Rio] 2:57
5. "You Can't Be True, Dear" [Gerhard Ebeler, Hal Cotton, Hans Otten, Ken Griffen] 2:48
6. "Plantation Boogie" [Lenny Dee] 2:27

=== Ernest Tubb's Golden Favorites ===
In 1961, Decca released Ernest Tubb's Golden Favorites (DL 4118), a collection of Tubb's hit singles in album format.

Side 1

1. "I'll Get Along Somehow"
2. "Slippin' Around" [Floyd Tillman]
3. "Filipino Baby" [Bill Cox, Clarke Van Ness]
4. "The World Has Turned You Down"
5. "Have You Been Lonely (Have You Ever Been Blue)" [Peter De Rose, Billy Hill]
6. "There's a Little Bit of Everything in Texas"

Side 2

1. "Walking the Floor Over You" [Ernest Tubb]
2. "Driftwood on the River"
3. "There's Nothing More to Say"
4. "Rainbow at Midnight" [Lost John Miller]
5. "I'll Always Be Glad to Take You Back"
6. "Let's Say Goodbye Like We said Hello (In a Friendly Sort of Way)" [Ernest Tubb, Jimmie Skinner]

=== Dance To My Golden Favorites (Sammy Kaye) ===
In 1961, Decca released Dance to My Golden Favorites, an album compiling in album format the hits of Swing and Sway With Sammy Kaye and His Orchestra (DL4121).

Side A

1. "Harbor Lights" [Jimmy Kennedy, Hugh Williams]
2. "Walkin' to Missouri" [Bob Merrill]
3. "Penny Serenade", vocals by Jimmy Brown [Melle Weersma, Hal Hallifax]
4. "Atlanta, G.A." [Sunny Skylar, Artie Shaftel]
5. "Roses" [Glenn Spencer, Tim Spencer]
6. "Laughing on the Outside (Crying on the Inside)" [Ben Raleigh, Bernie Wayne]

Side B

1. "It Isn't Fair" [Frank Warshauer, Richard Himber, Sylvester Sprigato]
2. "Chickery Chick" [Sidney Lippman, Sylvia Dee]
3. "I'm a Big Girl Now" [Al Hoffman, Jerry Livingston, Milton Drake]
4. "Blueberry Hill" [Al Lewis, Larry Stock, Vincent Rose]
5. "Room Full of Roses" [Tim Spencer]
6. "The Old Lamp-Lighter" [Charles Tobias, Nat Simon]

The album received a four-star review from Billboard in May 1961. Billboard praised the album for its "good sound and fine performances", opining that it "should bring back many memories of dancing and listening pleasure to Sammy Kaye's numerous fans."

=== Ella's Golden Favorites ===
In 1961, Decca released Ella's Golden Favorites, a compilation of hit singles previously released by Ella Fitzgerald (DL4129).

Reviewer Clyde Gilmour called the album "14k all the way" as Fitzgerald sings "the biggies that made her Big." Another reviewer, Trev Bennett, called it "a must for Ella collectors", consisting of "outstanding performances of many of the highlights of her dazzling career" with varied backing by Chick Webb, Louis Jordan, and others. A third reviewer, Chick Ober, wrote that Fitzgerald, "one of the greatest of modern pop singers, is heard in some of her greatest hits." And Indianapolis reviewer Lynn Hopper wrote that the album's recap of Ella's career was "all too brief" and could "only skim the high points," "but no one can say the 12 that are included aren't just great."

Side A

1. "Goody Goody"
2. "Stairway to the Stars", with Chick Webb and His Orchestra
3. "Angel Eyes"
4. "Old Devil Moon"
5. "Taking a Chance on Love"
6. "Cow-Cow Boogie (Cuma Ti-Yi-Yi-Ay)" with The Ink Spots

Side B

1. "Lover, Come Back to Me"
2. "A Sunday Kind Of Love"
3. "A-Tisket, A-Tasket" with Chick Webb and His Orchestra
4. "My Happiness"
5. "Stone Cold Dead in the Market (He Had It Coming)" with Louis Jordan and His Tympany Five
6. "I Got It Bad (and That Ain't Good)"

=== My Golden Favorites (Roberta Sherwood) ===
As part of its "Golden Favorites" series, Decca released My Golden Favorites (DL 4131) by Roberta Sherwood with orchestra under the direction of Ralph Burns.

Side 1

1. "How Deep Is the Ocean (How High Is the Sky)" [Irving Berlin] 3:15
2. "With My Eyes Wide Open, I'm Dreaming" [Harry Revel, Mack Gordon] 3:44
3. "My Baby Just Cares for Me" [Gus Kahn, Walter Donaldson] 3:00
4. "Oh, But I Do!" 3:17
5. "That's All" [Bob Haymes, Alan Brandt] 4:02
6. "You'd Be So Nice to Come Home To" [Cole Porter] 2:40

Side 2

1. "Make Someone Happy" [Jules Styne, Betty Comden, Adolph Green] 3:27
2. "I See Your Face Before Me" [Arthur Schwartz, Howard Dietz] 2:52
3. "These Foolish Things (Remind Me of You)" [Jack Strachey, Holt Marvell] 3:40
4. "You Have Taken My Heart" [Gordon Jenkins, Johnny Mercer] 3:09
5. "Stormy Weather (Rainin' All the Time" [Harold Arlen, Ted Koehler] 3:22
6. "When My Dreamboat Comes Home" 2:49

=== Satchmo's Golden Favorites ===
In October 1961, Decca released Satchmo's Golden Favorites (DL 4137), compiling 12 hit songs released as Decca singles by Louis Armstrong.

Side A

1. "Jeepers Creepers" [Harry Warren, Johnny Mercer] 3:41
2. "A Kiss to Build a Dream On" [Bert Kalmar, Harry Ruby, Oscar Hammerstein II] 3:00
3. "Old Man Mose" [Louis Armstrong, Zilner Randolph] 3:09
4. "Shadrack" [Robert Mac Gimsey] 2:43
5. "I Can't Give You Anything but Love, Baby" [Jimmy Mc Hugh, Dorothy Fields] 4:16
6. "The Whiffenpoof Song" (Baa Baa Baa) The Bobbenpoof Song [Pomeroy, Minnigerode, Vallee, Galloway] 2:55

B side

1. "La Vie en Rose" [Louiguy, Mack David] 3:20
2. "Someday You'll Be Sorry" [Louis Armstrong] 4:45
3. "Blueberry Hill" [Al Lewis, Larry Stock, Vincent Rose] 2:52
4. "On the Sunny Side of the Street" [Jimmy McHugh, Dorothy Fields] 5:48
5. "(Ill Be Glad When You're Dead) You Rascal You" [Sam Theard] 3:15
6. "When It's Sleepy Time Down South" [Clarence Muse, Leon Rene, Otis Rene] 3:15

In its October 1961 review of the album, Billboard called it "a generous helping of the older Satch", noting that "the gravelly vocal chords and brash trumpet are given good exposure for the collectors."

Reviewer Rolly Etrier described the album as "a bit of gravel voice with syrup" and "sweet trumpet sounds", calling it "a great new release" from which "Armstrong addicts ... are bound to derive real pleasure."

A column in the New Orleans States-Item described the album as having "considerable appeal to anyone not afflicted with the rock 'n' roll disease".

=== "Whoopee" John Wilfahrt's Golden Favorites ===
As part of its "Golden Favorites" series, Decca released "Whoopee" John Wilfahrt's Golden Favorites (DL 4139), a collection of polkas, waltzes and schottisches by "Whoopee" John Wilfahrt.

Side 1

1. "Julida Polka" 2:09
2. "St. Paul Waltz" 2:21
3. "Joan Pa Snippin and Nikolina - Schottische" 2:13
4. "Barbara Polka" 2:22
5. "The Blue Skirt Waltz" 2:17
6. "Springtime Polka" 2:37

Side 2

1. "Clarinet Polka"
2. "Life in the Finnish Woods" 2:15
3. "O Susanna Schottische" 2:45
4. "Homecoming Waltz"
5. "Beer Barrel Polka (Roll Out the Barrel)" 2:07
6. German Waltz Medley: (a) "Lauterbach Waltz", (b) "Du, Du Liegst Mir Im Herzen", (c) "Ach Du Lieber Augustin", (d) "Freut Euch Des Lebens"

=== Hawaii's Golden Favorites ===
As part of its "Golden Favorites" series, Decca released Hawaii's Golden Favorites (DL 4214), performed by Charles K.L. Davis with chorus and orchestra directed by Henri Rene.

Side 1

1. "Why I Love Hawaii"
2. "White Ginger Blossoms"
3. Medley: (a) "Nani Waimea", (b) "Pua Kukui"
4. "A Song of Old Hawaii"
5. "King Kamehameha (The Conqueror of the Islands)"
6. "Paauau Waltz"

Side 2

1. "Little Brown Gal"
2. "I'll Weave a Lei of Stars for You"
3. "Akaka Falls (Ka Wailele o Akaka)"
4. "Kuu Ipo (My Sweetheart)"
5. "Ulili E"
6. "Medley: (a) "Across the Sea", (b) "To You, Sweetheart, Aloha"

=== Golden Favorites (Russ Morgan) ===
In 1963, Decca issued the album "Golden Favorites" by big band leader and arranger Russ Morgan and His Orchestra (DL 4292).

Side A

1. Does Your Heart Beat For Me?
2. The Object Of My Affection
3. Do You Ever Think Of Me
4. Cruising Down The River
5. Linger Awhile - Stumbling
6. The Wang Wang Blues

Side B

1. So Tired
2. Josephine
3. You're Nobody 'Til Somebody Loves You
4. Wabash Blues
5. Johnson Rag
6. Dogface Soldier

=== Hamp's Golden Favorites ===
In 1962, Decca issued the album "Hamp's Golden Favorites" by vibraphonist and bandleader Lionel Hampton and His Orchestra (DL4296).

Side A

1. "Flying Home"
2. "Everybody's Somebody's Fool" (vocals by Jimmie Scott])
3. "How High the Moon"
4. "Blow-Top Blues" (vocals by Dinah Washington)
5. "Midnight Sun"
6. "Air Mail Special"

Side B

1. "Hamp's Boogie Woogie"
2. "Red Top"
3. "Gone Again" (vocals by Wini Brown)
4. "New Central Avenue Breakdown"
5. "Hey! Ba-Ba-Re-Bop"
6. "Rockin' in Rhythm"

=== Golden Favorites (The Ink Spots) ===
In 1962, Decca released Golden Favorites by The "Original" Ink Spots (DL 4297).

A side

1. "If I Didn't Care"
2. "We Three (My Echo, My Shadow, and Me)"
3. "My Prayer"
4. "Whispering Grass (Don't Tell the Trees)"
5. "I Don't Want to Set the World on Fire"
6. "Address Unknown"

B side

1. "It's Funny to Everyone but Me"
2. "To Each His Own"
3. "Do I Worry?"
4. "Someone's Rocking My Dreamboat"
5. "Street of Dreams"
6. "Don't Get Around Much Anymore"

=== Golden Waltzes from the Blue Room (Jan Garber) ===
In 1963, Decca issued the album "Golden Waltzes from the Blue Room" (DL 4300), a compilation of songs by violinist and bandleader Jan Garber and His Orchestra.

Side A

1. "Romantic Medley"
2. "Girl Friends Medley"
3. "Old Vienna Medley"
4. "Latin Medley"
5. "Memories Medley"

Side B

1. "Gay Nineties Medley"
2. "Sweethearts Medley"
3. "Gay Vienna Medley"
4. "Forever Medley"
5. "Goodnight Medley"

=== Golden Opera Favorites (Jesse Crawford) ===
In 1962, as part of its "Golden Favorites" series, Decca released Golden Opera Favorites (DL 4301) by organist Jesse Crawford at the Simonton Grande-Wurlitzer Pipe Organ.

Side 1

1. Celeste Aida
2. Song of India
3. The Last Rose of Summer
4. Berceuse
5. Meditation

Side 2

1. My Heart at Thy Sweet Voice
2. Ah, So Pure
3. O, Evening Star
4. Then You'll Remember Me
5. Barcarolle
6. Intermezzo

=== Golden Favorites (Wayne King) ===
In 1962, Decca released Golden Favorites by bandleader Wayne King and His Orchestra (DL 4309).

Side 1

1. "The Waltz You Saved for Me" 2:51
2. "Josephine" 2:59
3. "Now Is the Hour (Maori Farewell Song)" 2:35
4. "Near You" 2:40
5. "Dancing with Tears in My Eyes" 2:25
6. "Lonesome - That's All" 3:04

Side 2

1. "Goofus" 2:05
2. "Where the Blue of the Night (Meets the Gold of the Day)" 3:40
3. "Together" 2:25
4. "True Love" 2:49
5. "Deep Purple" 3:06
6. "Meet Me Tonight in Dreamland" (3:04

=== Golden Hollywood Themes ===
In 1963, Decca released a compilation of hit songs that were originally themes songs in motion pictures (DL4362).

Side A

1. Around The World (from Around The World In 80 Days) 2:34
2. Moonglow & Love Theme (from Picnic) 2:47
3. Spartacus Love Theme (from Spartacus) 2:45
4. Love Theme (from The Robe) 3:24
5. Young Love (from Rock, Pretty Baby) 2:41
6. Main Title (from The Man With The Golden Arm) 3:14

Side B

1. Main Title & Tammy (from Tammy and the Bachelor) 2:09
2. To Love Again (from The Eddy Duchin Story) 2:52
3. Theme (from Anastasia) 4:14
4. Theme from Imitation of Life
5. Love Theme (from For Whom The Bell Tolls) 2:53
6. Love Theme (from From Here To Eternity) 3:17

=== Italian Gold (Toni Arden) ===
In 1963, as part of its "Golden Favorites" series, Decca released Italian Gold (DL 4375), compiling hits of Toni Arden with Henri Rene and His Orchestra.

Side 1

1. "Just Say I Love Him (Dicitencello Vui)" 2:57
2. "Anema e Core (How Wonderful to Know)" 3:21
3. "Summertime in Venice (Tempo D'Estate a Venezia)"
4. "Come Prima (For the First Time)" 3:00
5. "Il Cielo In Una Stanza (This World We Love In)" 2:35
6. "Quando, Quando, Quando (Tell Me When) 2:43

Side 2

1. "Padre" 3:00
2. "Scalinatella (Stairway To The Sea)" 2:51
3. "Ritorna A Me (Return To Me)" 3:06
4. "Al-Di-La", from Warner Bros. picture "Rome Adventure" 2:40
5. "Mama" 3:07
6. "Guaglione (The Man With the Mandolino)" 2:18

=== Golden Favorites (Caterina Valente) ===
In 1964, Decca released the final album in its "Golden Favorites" series, a compilation of soungs by the Italian-French singer Caterina Valente (DL 4504).

Side A

1. "Malagueña" (from the suite "Andalucia)
2. "Poinciana (Song Of The Tree)"
3. "Kiss of Fire"
4. "Mack the Knife (Macky Messer)"
5. "Secret Love"
6. "Oho-Aha"

Side B

1. 'The Breeze And I" (from The Suite "Andalucia")
2. "Temptation"
3. "Siboney"
4. "C'est Si Bon (It's So Good)"
5. "Grenade"
6. "Flamingo"

== Coral releases ==
=== My Golden Favorites (Teresa Brewer) ===
In 1960, Decca subsidiary Coral released My Golden Favorites by pop singer Teresa Brewer (CRL 757351). The album covers a decade of Brewer's hits, dating back to her 1950 No. 1 hit, "(Put Another Nickel In) Music! Music! Music!", and includes her 1952 No.1 hit, "Till I Waltz Again with You", and her 1953 No. 2 hit, "Ricochet (Rick-O-Shay)".

The album's liner notes state that the label asked Brewer to pick, for this album, "those songs she considers her personal favorites." After much "soul-searching," and a lot of listening, "she narrowed her choice to the songs in this album. Some meant a great deal to her in her career, others she enjoyed singing the most, and still others have a special meaning for her."

Side A

1. "Ricochet (Rick-O-Shay)" [Joe Darion, Larry Coleman, Norman Gimbel] 2:40
2. "Let Me Go, Lover!" [Al Hill, Jenny Lou Carson]
3. "You Send Me" [C. Cooke] 2:55
4. "Empty Arms" [Ivory Joe Hunter] 2:45
5. "The One Rose (That's Left In My Heart)" [Del Lyon, Lani McIntire]
6. "Heavenly Lover (Al Chiar Di Luna Porto Fortuna)" [D. A. Testa, C. A. Rossi] 2:20

Side B

1. "Till I Waltz Again with You" [Sidney Prosen]
2. "(Put Another Nickel In) Music! Music! Music!" [Bernie Baum, Stephen Weiss] 2:49
3. "A Tear Fell" [Dorian Burton, Eugene Randolph]
4. "Mutual Admiration Society" [Harold Karr, Matt Dubey] 2:15
5. "Peace of Mind" [Lou Fields] 2:25
6. "A Sweet Old Fashioned Girl" [Bob Merrill] 2:52

=== Our Golden Favorites (Ames Brothers) ===
In 1960, Coral released Our Golden Favorites, a compilation album of hits previously released as singles by the Ames Brothers (CRL 57338). The album includes the No. 1 hits "Rag Mop" (1949) and "Sentimental Me" (1949), but omits many of the group's hits, including "You, You, You" (1953, No. 1), "Can Anyone Explain?" (1950, No. 5), "Tammy" (1957 No. 5), "The Naughty Lady of Shady Lane" (1954, No. 3), and "Melodie D'Amour" (1957, No. 5).

Side A

1. "Sentimental Me" [Jim Morehead*, Jimmy Cassin] 3:13
2. "Undecided" [Charles Shavers*, Sid Robin]
3. "Stardust" [Hoagy Carmichael, Mitchell Parish] 3:08
4. "Joshua Fit De Battle Of Jericho" 1:57
5. "Tumbling Tumbleweeds" [Bob Nolan] 2:48
6. "You Are My Sunshine" [Charles Mitchell, Jimmie Davis] 2:10

Side B

1. "Rag Mop" [Deacon Anderson, Johnnie L. Willis] 2:36
2. "Sentimental Journey" [Ben Homer, Bud Green, Les Brown]
3. "Blue Prelude" [Gordon Jenkins, Joe Bishop] 2:52
4. "The Sheik Of Araby" [P. W. Wheeler, H. B. Smith, Ted Snyder] 2:23
5. "Hawaiian War Chant (Ta-Hu Wa Hu Wai)" [Johnny Noble, Leleiohoku, Ralph Freed]
6. "Dry Bones" 2:04

=== Our Golden Favorites (The McGuire Sisters) ===
In 1960, Decca released Our Golden Favorites (CRL 757349), a compilation album consisting of hits previously released as singles .

Side A

1. "Sugartime" [Charlie Phillips, Odis Echols]
2. "Goodnight, Sweetheart, Goodnight" [Calvin Carter, James Hudson]
3. "Something's Gotta Give" [Johnny Mercer]
4. "Picnic" [George Duning, Steve Allen]
5. "Muskrat Ramble" [Kid Ory, Ray Gilbert]
6. "Around The World" [Harold Adamson, Victor Young]

Side B

1. "Sincerely" [Alan Freed, Harvey Fuqua]
2. "Volare" [D. Modugno, F. Migliacci, M. Parish]
3. "He" [Jack Richards, Richard Mullan]
4. "It May Sound Silly" [Ivory Joe Hunter]
5. "Melody Of Love" [H. Engelmann, Tom Glazer]
6. "May You Always" [Dick Charles, Larry Markes]

=== My Golden Favorites (Lawrence Welk) ===
In 1961, Coral released My Golden Favorites by Lawrence Welk and His Champagne Music, compiling 12 of his earlier hits in long-playing album format (CRL 75753).

Side A

1. "Till We Meet Again", vocal solo by Roberta Linn
2. "Full Moon and Empty Arms"
3. "Clair de Lune"
4. "Till the End of Time"
5. "I'll See You in My Dreams", vocal solo by Roberta Linn
6. "Sunrise Serenade", accordion by Myron Floren

Side B

1. "Moonlight Cocktail", accordion by Myron Floren
2. "Twilight Time"
3. "Lisbon Antigua"
4. "I Could Have Danced All Night", vocals by Alice Lon and The Sparklers
5. "Moonglow and Theme From 'Picnic'"
6. "Stranger in Paradise"

=== My Parade of Golden Favorites (Liberace) ===
In 1961, Coral released My Parade of Golden Favorites, a compilation of songs performed by pianist Liberace accompanied by an orchestra conducted by Gordon Robinson (CRL 757377).

Side 1

1. "To Each His Own" 3:18
2. "Too Young" 2:40
3. "You Belong To Me" 2:08
4. "Over the Rainbow" 2:49
5. "Love Letters in the Sand" 2:05
6. "Tammy" 2:41

Side 2

1. "Near You"
2. "My Reverie"
3. "Little Things Mean a Lot"
4. "I Hear a Rhapsody"
5. "Buttons and Bows"
6. "I'll Be Seeing You"

=== The Golden Rock and Roll Instrumentals ===
In 1962, as part of the Decca/Coral "Golden Favorites" sereies, Coral released The Golden Rock and Roll Instrumentals performed by the "Boss" Combo.

Side 1

1. "Last Night"
2. "Raunchy"
3. "Apache"
4. "Tequila"
5. "Wheels"
6. "Honky Tonk"

Side 2

1. "Walk Don't Run"
2. "Sleep Walk"
3. "Mexico"
4. "The Happy Organ"
5. "Last Date"
6. "The Twist"

=== Barroom Golden Favorites ("Big" Tiny Little) ===
As part of the "Golden Favorites" series, Coral released the album "Barroom Golden Favorites" with ragtime and honky tonk songs by pianist ""Big" Tiny Little.

Side 1

1. "Beer Barrel Polka (Roll Out The Barrel)"
2. "Wheel of Fortune"
3. "The Darktown Strutters"
4. "There Is a Tavern in This Town"
5. "Bill Bailey, Won't You Please Come Home"
6. "Josephine"

Side 2

1. "Silver Dollar"
2. "Sweet Violets"
3. "Some of These Days"
4. "I Wish I Could Shimmy Like My Sister Kate"
5. 'You've Got To See Mamma Ev'ry Night (Or You Can't See Mamma at All)"
6. "San Antonio Rose'

== Brunswick releases ==
=== My Golden Favorites (Jackie Wilson) ===
In 1960, Decca subsidiary Brunswick released My Golden Favorites by Jackie Wilson (BL 54058). The album includes Wilson's No. 1 hits "Reet Petite" (1957, No. 1 UK, No. 5 R&B), "Lonely Teardrops" (1958, No. 1 R&B), and "You Better Know It" (1959, No. 1 R&B).

Side A

1. "Reet Petite" [Berry Gordy] 2:40
2. "To Be Loved"
3. "I'll Be Satisfied" [Berry Gordy, Tyran Carlo] 2:09
4. "Only You, Only Me" 3:09
5. "Talk That Talk" [Sid Wyche] 2:14
6. "Ask" 3:09

Side B

1. "That's Why (I Love You So)" [Berry Gordy, Tyran Carlo] 2:05
2. "It's All Part of Love" 2:22
3. "Lonely Teardrops" [Berry Gordy, Billy Davis, Gwendolyn Gordy]
4. "I'm Wanderin'" [Berry Gordy, Tyran Carlo] 2:39
5. "You Better Know It" [Jackie Wilson, Norm Henry] 1:59
6. "We Have Love" [Tyran Carlo, Berry Gordy, Gwendolyn Gordy] 2:20
