= Kitty Wells singles discography =

Kitty Wells discography
- Singles: 90
- B-sides: 19
- Music videos: 2

The singles discography of Kitty Wells, an American country artist, consists of ninety singles, nineteen B-sides, and two music videos. In 1949 she was signed to RCA Victor Records, where she released her debut single, "Death at the Bar" also in 1949. Dropped from RCA in 1950, Wells signed with Decca Records and released the single "It Wasn't God Who Made Honky Tonk Angels" in 1952. The song was an answer song to Hank Thompson's hit, "The Wild Side of Life", spending six weeks at number one on the Billboard Magazine Hot C&W Sides chart. The single sold one million copies and made Wells the first female country artist to have a single reach number one on the Billboard country list. Until the end of the decade, Wells became the only woman on the country chart that would consistently receive radio airplay. In 1953 the song, "Paying for That Back Street Affair" reached #6 on the Billboard Hot C&W Sides list, as well as twenty one additional Top Ten singles on the same chart between 1953 and 1959. This included singles such as the Red Foley duet "One by One" (1954), "Making Believe" (1955), "I Can't Stop Loving You" (1958), "Mommy for a Day" (1959), and "Amigo's Guitar" (1959). The latter song was written by Wells herself and later won her a BMI Songwriter's Award.

In 1961, Wells had her second number one single with "Heartbreak U.S.A.", and an album of the same name was later released that year. During the decade, Wells had eleven more singles that would become Top Ten hits. In 1962 all three of her singles reached the Top Ten: "Unloved, Unwanted", "Will Your Lawyer Talk To God", and "We Missed You". She had her final major hit with 1966's "It's All Over But the Crying", which went to #14 on the Billboard Hot Country Singles chart. Wells continued recording for Decca until 1975, however most of her singles began to remain absent from the country chart. In 1975 she released three singles from her album, Forever Young, however none of them were successful. In 1979 she and her husband Johnnie Wright formed the label Rubocca Records, where she released the single "Thank You for the Roses" (1979), which peaked at #60 on the Hot Country Singles chart and became her final solo single to chart.

== Singles ==
=== 1940s and 1950s ===
Year	Title	Peak chart positions		Album
Year	Title	US Country	US	Album
1949	"Death at the Bar"	—	—	—N/a
1949	"Don't Wait for the Last Minute to Pray"	—	—	—N/a
1950	"Make Up Your Mind"	—	—	—N/a
1950	"How Far Is Heaven"	—	—	—N/a
1952	"Glory Land March"	—	—	—N/a
1952	"It Wasn't God Who Made Honky Tonk Angels"	1	—	Country Hit Parade
1952	"A Wedding Ring Ago"	—	—	The Kitty Wells Story
1953	"The Things I Might Have Been"	—	—	Country Hit Parade
1953	"Paying for That Back Street Affair"	6	—	Country Hit Parade
1953	"Honky Tonk Waltz"	—	—	Country Heart
1953	"I Don't Claim to Be an Angel"	—	—	Country Hit Parade
1953	"Hey Joe"	8	—	Kitty Wells' Golden Favorites
1953	"Cheatin's a Sin"	9	—	Country Hit Parade
1954	"Release Me"	8	—	Country Hit Parade
1954	"You're Not So Easy to Forget"	—	—	After Dark
1954	"Thou Shalt Not Steal"	14	—	—N/a
1955	"Making Believe"	2	—	Country Hit Parade
1955	"There's Poison in Your Heart"	9	—	Country Hit Parade
1955	"The Lonely Side of Town"	7	—	After Dark
1956	"How Far Is Heaven" (with Carol Sue)	11	—	Singing on Sunday
1956	"Searching (For Someone Like You)"	3	—	The Kitty Wells Story 1963
1956	"Repenting"	6	—	Kitty Wells' Golden Favorites
1957	"Three Ways (To Love You)"	7	—	Kitty Wells' Golden Favorites
1957	"(I'll Always Be Your) Fraulein"	10	—	Kitty Wells' Golden Favorites
1958	"I Can't Stop Loving You"	3	—	Kitty Wells' Golden Favorites
1958	"Jealousy"	7	78	Kitty Wells' Golden Favorites
1958	"Touch and Go Heart"	15	—	The Lonely Side of Town
1959	"Mommy for a Day"	5	—	Kitty Wells' Golden Favorites
1959	"Your Wild Life's Gonna Get You Down"	12	—	After Dark
1959	"Amigo's Guitar"	5	—	Seasons of My Heart
"—" denotes releases that did not chart.

=== 1960s ===
Year	Title	Peak chart positions		Album
Year	Title	US Country	CAN Country	Album
1960	"Left to Right"	5	—	Kitty Wells' Golden Favorites
1960	"Carmel by the Sea"	16	—	—N/a
1961	"The Other Cheek"	19	—	The Kitty Wells Story
1961	"Heartbreak U.S.A."	1	—	Heartbreak U.S.A.
1961	"Day into Night"	10	—	—N/a
1962	"Unloved, Unwanted"	5	—	Especially for You
1962	"Will Your Lawyer Talk To God"	8	—	Especially for You
1962	"We Missed You"	7	—	Especially for You
1963	"Cold and Lonely (Is the Forecast for Tonight)"	13	—	Especially for You
1963	"A Heartache for a Keepsake"	29	—	—N/a
1964	"This White Circle"	7	—	Country Music Time
1964	"Password"	4	—	Country Music Time
1964	"I'll Repossess My Heart"	8	—	Burning Memories
1965	"You Don't Hear"	4	—	Burning Memories
1965	"Meanwhile, Down at Joe's"	9	—	Country All the Way
1965	"A Woman Half My Age"	15	—	Country All the Way
1966	"It's All Over (But the Crying)"	14	—	A Woman Never Forgets
1966	"A Woman Never Forgets"	52	—	Country All the Way
1967	"Love Makes the World Go Around"	34	—	Love Makes the World Go Around
1967	"Queen of the Honky Tonk Street"	28	—	Queen of the Honky Tonk Street
1968	"My Big Truck Drivin' Man"	35	23	Kitty Wells Showcase
1968	"Gypsy King"	52	17	The Cream of Country Hits
1968	"Happiness Hill"	47	10	Guilty Street
1969	"Guilty Street"	61	—	Guilty Street
1969	"Just a Cheap Affair"	—	—	Bouquet of Country Hits
1969	"White Christmas"	—	—	Christmas Day
"—" denotes releases that did not chart.

=== 1970s and 1980s ===
Year	Title	Peak chart positions		Album
Year	Title	US Country	CAN Country	Album
1970	"I Don't See What I Saw"	—	—	Singing 'em Country
1970	"Your Love Is the Way"	71	—	Your Love Is the Way
1970	"That Ain't a Woman's Way"	—	—	They're Stepping All Over My Heart
1971	"They're Stepping All Over My Heart"	72	—	They're Stepping All Over My Heart
1971	"Pledging My Love"	49	19	Pledging My Love
1971	"Reno Airport, Nashville"	—	—	Sincerely, Kitty Wells
1972	"Sincerely"	72	—	Sincerely, Kitty Wells
1972	"Love Is the Answer"	—	—	Sincerely, Kitty Wells
1972	"I've Got Yesterday"	—	—	I've Got Yesterday
1972	"Full Grown Man"	—	—	Yours Truly
1973	"Easily Persuaded"	—	—	Yours Truly
1973	"Mississippi Missus"	—	—	—N/a
1974	"Forever Young"	—	—	Forever Young
1974	"Too Much Love Between Us"	—	—	Forever Young
1974	"I've Been Loving You Too Long"	—	—	Forever Young
1975	"Anybody Out There Wanna Be a Daddy"	94	—	—N/a
1975	"Nickel Bar Candy"	—	—	—N/a
1979	"Thank You for the Roses"	75	—	Hall of Fame, Vol. I
1980	"Old Milwaukee's Talking"	—	—	—N/a
1981	"I'll Hold You in My Heart"	—	—	Hall of Fame, Vol. II
1983	"You Don't Have to Hire a Wino (I'll Give You Mine for Free)"	—	—	—N/a
1989	"It Wasn't God Who Made Honky Tonk Angels" (re-recording)	—	—	Greatest Hits, Vol. 1
"—" denotes releases that did not chart.

== Other singles ==
=== Collaborative singles ===
Year	Title	Artist(s)	Peak chart positions		Album
Year	Title	Artist(s)	US Country	CAN Country	Album
1954	"One By One"	Red Foley	1	—	Kitty Wells' and Red Foley's; Golden Favorites
1954	"As Long as I Live"	Red Foley	3	—	Kitty Wells' and Red Foley's; Golden Favorites
1955	"You and Me"	Red Foley	3	—	Kitty Wells' and Red Foley's; Golden Favorites
1957	"Oh, So Many Years"	Webb Pierce	8	—	—N/a
1957	"One Week Later"	Webb Pierce	12	—	—N/a
1960	"I Can't Tell My Heart That"	Roy Drusky	26	—	—N/a
1964	"Finally"	Webb Pierce	9	2	—N/a
1967	"Happiness Means You"	Red Foley	43	—	Together Again
1968	"Living as Strangers"	Red Foley	63	—	Together Again
1968	"We'll Stick Together"	Johnnie Wright	54	—	We'll Stick Together
1968	"Have I Told You Lately That I Love You"	Red Foley	74	—	Together Again
"—" denotes releases that did not chart.

=== Guest singles ===
Year	Title	Artist(s)	Peak chart positions	Album
Year	Title	Artist(s)	US Country	Album
1979	"The Wild Side of Life"	Rayburn Anthony	60	—N/a

== Charted B-sides ==
Year	Title	Peak chart positions	A-Side Single
Year	Title	US Country	A-Side Single
1954	"I'm a Stranger in My Home" (with Red Foley)	12	"One By One" (with Red Foley)
1954	"Make Believe ('Til We Can Make It Come True)" (with Red Foley)	6	"As Long as I Live" (with Red Foley)
1955	"Who's Shoulder Will You Cry On"	7	"Makin' Believe"
1955	"I'm in Love with You"	12	"There's Poison in Your Heart"
1955	"I've Kissed You My Last Time"	7	"The Lonely Side of Town"
1956	"No One But You" (with Red Foley)	flip	"You and Me" (with Red Foley)
1956	"I'd Rather Stay Home"	13	"Searching (For Someone Like You)"
1956	"I'm Counting on You"	flip	"Repenting"
1958	"She's No Angel"	flip	"I Can't Stop Loving You"
1958	"He's Lost His Love for Me"	16	"Touch and Go Heart"
1959	"All the Time"	18	"Mommy for a Day"
1961	"Fickle Fun"	29	"The Other Cheek"
1961	"There Must Be Another Way to Live"	20	"Heartbreak U.S.A."
1961	"Our Mansion Is a Prison Now"	21	"Day into Night"
1963	"I Gave My Wedding Dress Away"	22	"A Heartache for Keepsake"
1964	"I've Thought of Leaving You"	34	"Password"
1965	"Six Lonely Hours"	27	"I'll Repossess My Heart"
1966	"Only Me and My Hairdresser Know"	49	"A Woman Never Forgets"
1967	"Hello No. 1" (with Red Foley)	60	"Happiness Means You" (with Red Foley)
"—" denotes releases that did not chart.

== Music videos ==
Year	Song	Director(s)	References
1987	"Honky Tonk Angels Medley" (with k.d. lang with Brenda Lee, Loretta Lynn, and Kitty Wells)	David Hogan	
