= Unloved, Unwanted =

Song by Kitty Wells
- Released: 1962
- Genre: Country
- Label: Decca
- Songwriters: Wayne Walker, Irene Stanton

"Unloved, Unwanted" is a country song written by Wayne Walker and Irene Stanton and popularized by singer Kitty Wells. The song was recorded at the Owen Bradley Studio in July 1961 at Nashville, Tennessee; it was released in February 1962 on the Decca label (record no. 31349) with "Au Re Voir (Goodbye)" as the "B" side. It peaked in May 1962 at No. 5 on Billboard's country and western chart.

The song's lyrics describe a marriage in which a wife wears her husband's ring but feels unloved, unwanted, and blue, as he has another woman in his arms and heart. She knows she should leave, but she doesn't want to do so.

The song also appeared on Wells' 1964 album, "Especially for You" (1964).

== See also ==
- Kitty Wells singles discography
