= Heartbreak U.S.A. (album) =

Studio album by Kitty Wells
- Released: 1961
- Genre: Country
- Label: Decca
- Producer: Owen Bradley

Kitty Wells chronology
Golden Favorites (1961)	Heartbreak U.S.A. (1961)	Queen of Country Music (1962)

Heartbreak U.S.A. is an album recorded by Kitty Wells and released in 1961 on the Decca label (DL 4141). The title track, "Heartbreak U.S.A." reached No. 1 on the U.S. Billboard country and western chart.

== Track listing ==
Side 1

1. "Heartbreak U.S.A." (Harlan Howard) [2:35]
2. "Heart to Heart Talk" (Lee Ross)
3. "Heartaches by the Number" (Harlan Howard) [2:50]
4. "My Heart Echoes" (John Bailes, Homer Bailes, Zeke Clements, Muriel Wright) [2:29]
5. "I've Got a New Heartache" (Ray Price, Wayne Walker) [2:31]
6. "Open Up Your Heart (and Let the Sunshine In)" (Stuart Hamblen) [3:03]

Side 2

1. "This Old Heart" (Eddie Miller, Bob Morris) [2:18]
2. "I'll Hold You in My Heart (Till I Can Hold You in My Arms)" (Eddy Arnold, Thomas Dilbeck)
3. "Excuse Me (I Think I've Got a Heartache)" (Buck Owens, Harlan Howard) [2:45]
4. "Cold, Cold Heart" (Hank Williams) [3:06]
5. "The Best of All My Heartaches" (Tom Tall) [2:25]
6. "Leave All the Heartache to Me" (Bill Anderson) [2:40]
