= Repenting (song) =

Song by Kitty Wells
- Released: 1956
- Genre: Country
- Label: Decca
- Songwriter: Gary Walker

"Repenting" is a country song written by Gary Walker and popularized by singer Kitty Wells. The song was released in October 1956 on the Decca label (record no. 9-30094, 45 no. 45-100621) with "I'm Counting on You" as the "B" side. It peaked at No. 6 on Billboard's country and western chart in January 1957. The song continued its popularity in 1957, ranking at No. 47 on Billboard Top Country & Western Records of 1957.

The song's lyrics consist of the protagonist singing to her spouse or significant other on her knees, repenting and begging forgiveness with "a humble heart laid at your feet" for "a few careless hours that never should have been", and promising to "never do you wrong again."

Upon the record's release, Billboard in November 1956 featured it in its "Review Spotlight", writing: "The country queen does it agin with top efforts. That clean, clear sound of tragedy belts right thru on both these fine chunks of ballad material and neither should have any trouble in showing fast and sustained sales power." One week after its initial review, Billboard wrote that, in its first 10 days, the record had "piled up big sales figures in all major country markets." Songwriter Gary Walker told The Nashville Banner in November 1956 that he felt "tremendously lucky" to have Wells record the song.

The song has appeared on multiple compilation albums, including Time-Life's "Country U.S.A.: 1957" (1988); "Kitty Wells' Golden Favorites" (1961); "The Kitty Wells Story" (1963); "Queen of Country Music" (1994); "God's Honky Tonk Angel: The First Queen of Country Music" (2000); "Kitty Wells A-Sides 1949-1957" (2011); "Kitty Wells: The Complete Country Hits 1952-62" (2015); and "Kitty Wells The Decca Singles 1956-1958" (2022).

== See also ==
- Kitty Wells singles discography
