= Ruby Wright (country singer) =

American country singer (1939–2009)

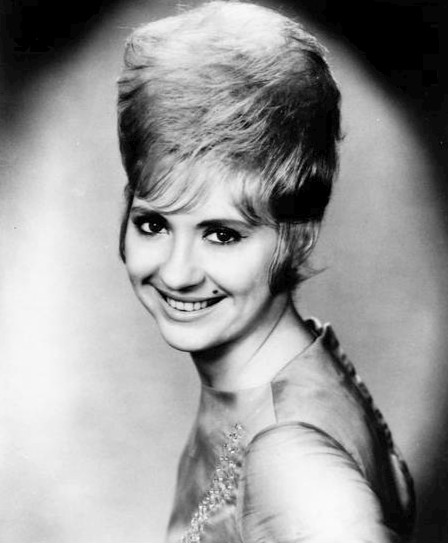
- Wright circa 1966

Background information
- Also known as: Ruby Wells
- Born: October 27, 1939
- Origin: Nashville, Tennessee, U.S.
- Died: September 27, 2009 (aged 69)
- Genres: Country
- Occupation: Singer-songwriter
- Labels: RCA, Cadence, Kapp, Epic

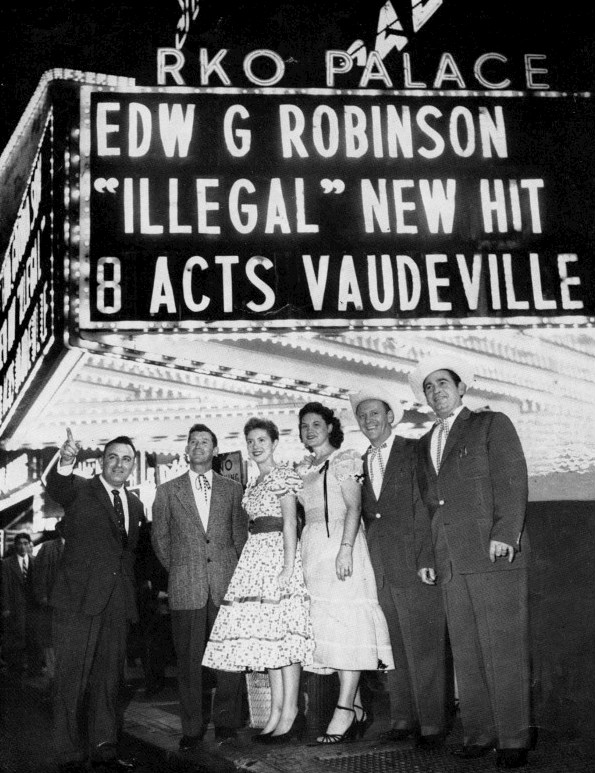
Wright with Roy Acuff, her parents, Kitty Wells and Johnnie Wright, and her uncle, Jack Anglin, as they played the RKO Palace in New York in 1955

Ruby Wright (October 27, 1939 – September 27, 2009) was an American country music singer-songwriter. Wright was the daughter of country singers Kitty Wells and Johnnie Wright. She sang with her parents as a young girl and at age 13, was signed by RCA Records as Ruby Wells because there was also a Ruby Wright who was a pop singer.

In the mid-1950s, she became part of an all-girl trio, 'Nita, Rita and Ruby. The Nita of the trio was Anita Carter of the well-known Carter Family. Working with Chet Atkins, the young singers enjoyed some success on record. Strictly a recording group, they did not make personal appearances or tours; Rita had a problem with stage fright which eventually meant the break-up of the trio. After the trio disbanded, Ruby began singing with her sister, Carol Sue, as The Wright Sisters. They were signed to a recording contract by Cadence Records also under the direction of Chet Atkins. Ruby also made some recordings as Ruby Wells with her father and uncle as Johnnie and Jack and Ruby. Her most successful single was "Dern Ya", an answer to Roger Miller's "Dang Me". She signed with Epic Records in 1966. Wright recorded for Plantation Records and Scorpion Records, as well as other small labels during the 1970s.

Wright died of heart-related illness on September 27, 2009, at age 69. Her father, Johnnie, died two years later to the day.

== Discography ==
=== Albums ===
Year	Album	Label
1966	Dern Ya	Kapp

=== Singles ===
Year	Single	Chart Positions			Album
Year	Single	US Country	US	CAN Country	Album
1964	"Dern Ya"	13	103	4	Dern Ya
1964	"Billy Broke My Heart at Walgreens (I Cried All The Way To Sears)"	—	—	—	Dern Ya
1965	"Up the Path and In My Door"	—	—	—	Dern Ya
1965	"Adios, Aloha"	—	—	—	Dern Ya
1966	"A New Place to Hang Your Hat"	72	—	—	singles only
1967	"(I Can Find) A Better Deal Than That"	69	—	—	singles only
