= LTR =

LTR or similar may refer to:

== Measurement ==
- Ltr. (for 'litre' or 'liter'), a unit of volume
- Letter (paper size)

== Science and technology ==
- Learning to rank, ordering data with machine learning
- Left-to-right mark, a bidirectional control character
- Load task register, a machine-code instruction
- Logic Trunked Radio, a two-way radio system
- Long terminal repeat, a DNA sequence

== Other uses ==
- Left to right, a directionality of writing systems
- Little River railway station, Australia
- London Turkish Radio, an Internet radio station

== See also ==
- Left to Right, a song by Kitty Wells
- Left to Right (short story), a short story by Isaac Asimov
