= You Don't Hear =

Song by Kitty Wells
- Released: 1965
- Genre: Country
- Label: Decca
- Songwriters: Tommy Cash, Jerry Huffman

"You Don't Hear" is a country song written by Tommy Cash and Jerry Huffman and popularized by singer Kitty Wells. The song was released in April 1965 on the Decca label (record no. 31749) with "Six Lonely Hours" as the "B" side. In May 1965, Billboard wrote that the song "continues to prove Wells' right to the title of First Lady of Country Music", having put her "right back at the top of the charts." It peaked at No. 4 on Billboard's country and western chart in June 1965. It was Wells' last song to make it to country's top five. The song also appeared on Wells' 1965 album Burning Memories.

The song's lyrics describe a husband who no longer cares for his wife, who spends his time away from the home, and who doesn't hear a word she says. Despite her concerns, she still loves him and talks to him all the time, but he doesn't hear.

== See also ==
- Kitty Wells singles discography
