= Country Music Time =

Studio album by Kitty Wells
- Released: 1964
- Genre: Country
- Label: Decca

Kitty Wells chronology
The Kitty Wells Story (1963)	Country Music Time (1964)	Especially for You (1964)

Country Music Time is an album recorded by Kitty Wells and released in 1964 on the Decca label (DL 4554). Wells was accompanied on the album by the Jordanaires. The album included two Top 10 country singles: "Password" (No. 4) and "This White Circle on My Finger" (No. 7). Thom Owens of Allmusic called the album "a strong mid-'60s album".

== Track listing ==
Side A

1. "I've Thought of Leaving Too" (Lee Emerson) [2:41]
2. "Begging to You" (Marty Robbins) [2:10]
3. "B.J. the D.J." (Hugh X. Lewis) [3:10]
4. "Old Records" (Arthur Thomas, Merle Kilgore) [1:58]
5. "As Usual" (Alex Zanetis) [2:10]
6. "Going Through the Motions of Living" (Bob Tubert, Jean Chapel) [2:14]

Side B

1. "Gonna Find Me a Bluebird" (Marvin Rainwater) [2:39]
2. "This White Circle on My Finger" (Dorothy Lewis, Margie Bainbridge) [2:47]
3. "A Wound Time Can't Erase" (Bill D. Johnson) [2:43]
4. "Password" (Herman Phillips) [2:30]
5. "(I Didn't Have To) Break Up Someone's Home" (Justin Tubb) [2:32]
6. "Before This Day Ends" (Marie Wilson, Roy Drusky, Vic McAlpin) [2:33]
