= Burning Memories =

Burning Memories may refer to:

- Burning Memories (Ray Price album), 1965, and the title song
- Burning Memories (Kitty Wells album), 1985, and the same title song as above
- "Burning Memories", a song by Machine Gun Kelly, from the album Hotel Diablo

== See also ==
- "It's Just a Burning Memory", a 2016 song by The Caretaker
