= Paying for That Back Street Affair =

Song by Kitty Wells
- Released: 1953
- Genre: Country
- Label: Decca
- Songwriters: Billy Wallace, Jimmy Rule

"Paying for That Back Street Affair" is a country song written by Billy Wallace and Jimmy Rule and popularized by singer Kitty Wells. An answer song to Webb Pierce's No. 1 hit "Back Street Affair", Wells's record was released in February 1953 on the Decca label (record no. 28578) with "Crying Steel Guitar Waltz" as the "B" side. It peaked at No. 6 on Billboard's country and western best sellers chart. Regionally, it peaked in March 1953 at No. 2 in Nashville and Cincinnati, blocked from the No. 1 spot by the recently-deceased Hank Williams' Kaw-Liga.

The song's lyrics tell of a woman who fell in love with a man not knowing that he had a home and that his wife had not gone wrong. She later discovers that he fooled her. He gambled, and she lost. He returns to a forgiving wife, but as gossip spreads, she can't live it down and knows it's hopeless as she is the one paying for that backstreet affair.

The song has appeared on multiple compilation albums, including "Country Hit Parade" (1956), "The Kitty Wells Story" (1963), "Kitty Wells Greatest Hits" (1995), "The Collection" (2003), "20 All-Time Greatest Hits" (2004), and "The Essential Recordings" (2011)

== See also ==
- Kitty Wells singles discography
