= Amigo's Guitar =

Song by Kitty Wells
- Released: 1959
- Genre: Country
- Label: Decca
- Songwriters: Roy Bodkin, John D. Loudermilk, Kitty Wells

"Amigo's Guitar" is a country song written by Roy Bodkin, John D. Loudermilk, and Kitty Wells, and popularized by Wells. Wells' version of the song was released in October 1959 on the Decca label with "Lonely Is the Word" as the "B" side. It peaked in January 1960 at No. 5 on Billboard's country and western chart.

The song's lyrics describe a romantic ecounter as "amigo" plays his lonely blue guitar.

Upon the song's release, Billboard called it a strong offering and "an attractive item with Latin overtures."

The song was also covered in 1960 with "a pop twist" by Dodie Stevens. It has also been covered by other artists, including Billy Walker on his 1965 album "The Gun, the Gold and the Girl".

The song was included on several albums, including "Kitty Wells' Golden Favorites" (1961), "The Kitty Wells Story" (1963), "Kitty Wells Greatest Hits Vol. 1" (1989), "Kitty Wells Greatest Songs" (1995), "Country Music Hall of Fame Series" (1991), "God's Honky Tonk Angel: The First Queen of Country Music" (2000), "20th Century Masters - The Millennium Collection: The Best of Ktty Wells" (2002), and "20 All-Time Greatest Hits" (2004).

== See also ==
- Kitty Wells singles discography
