= Back Street Affair =

"Back Street Affair" is a song written by country singer Billy Wallace and Nashville songwriter Jimmy Rule, and released by Wallace in April 1952.

== Background ==
The song was first offered to Hank Williams, then the undisputed "King" of country music. He was singing it on his early morning radio shows and that's how Webb Pierce first heard it. Fred Rose, Hank's music publisher and unofficial manager wouldn't let Hank record it saying it was too risky, as it was a little risque for the time. Hank told Webb ..."I think anyone's got guts enough to record it has got themselves a number one hit."

== Webb Pierce recording ==
In August 1952, Webb Pierce released his version. Pierce's song was his third straight number-one single on the C&W Best Seller charts, where it stayed at number one for two weeks.

== Answer record ==
- In 1953, Kitty Wells, had a hit song with an answer record entitled, "Paying for That Back Street Affair" which reached number six on the C&W Best Seller charts.

== Cover versions ==
- Conway Twitty covered the song on his 1970 album 'Fifteen Years Ago'. 2 years later, he covered the song again as a duet with Loretta Lynn on their second studio album Lead Me On, released on February 7, 1972 by Decca Records.
- John Prine covered the song on his 1999 album In Spite of Ourselves.
- Van Morrison covered the song on his 2006 album Pay the Devil.
