= Christmas Day with Kitty Wells =

Studio album by Kitty Wells
- Released: 1962
- Genre: Christmas
- Label: Decca

Kitty Wells chronology
Singing on Sunday (1962)	Christmas Day with Kitty Wells (1962)	The Kitty Wells Story (1963)

Christmas Day with Kitty Wells is a Christmas album recorded by country music singer Kitty Wells and released in 1962 on the Decca label (DL 4349). Wells was accompanied by the Jordanaires on the album. Allmusic gave it three stars.

== Track listing ==
Side 1

1. "Dasher with the Light Upon His Tail" (Warner McPherson)
2. "C-H-R-I-S-T-M-A-S" (Jenny Lou Carson, Eddy Arnold)
3. "Santa's on His Way" (Bill Phillips, Nita Phillips)
4. "Christmas Ain't Like Christmas Anymore" (Roy Botkin, George Gray)
5. "Jingle Bells" (James Lord Pierpont)
6. "Silent Night" (Franz Xaver Gruber, John F. Young)

Side 2

1. "Here Comes Santa Claus (Right Down Santa Claus Lane)" (Oakley Haldeman, Gene Autry)
2. "Rudolph the Red-Nosed Reindeer" (Johnny Marks)
3. "Blue Christmas" (Billy Hayes, Jay W. Johnson)
4. "Ole Kris Kringle" (Roy Botkin)
5. "White Christmas" (Irving Berlin)
6. "Away in a Manger" (Traditional)
