= I'll Repossess My Heart =

Song by Kitty Wells
- Released: 1964
- Genre: Country
- Label: Decca
- Songwriter: Paul Yandell

"I'll Repossess My Heart" is a country song written by Paul Yandell and popularized by singer Kitty Wells. The song was released in 1964 on the Decca label (no. 31705) with "Kill Him With Kindness" as the "B" side. It peaked at No. 8 on Billboard's country and western chart in August 1965. The song also appeared on Wells' 1965 album Burning Memories.

The song's lyrics are told from the perspective a woman who has been treated poorly for too long and has decided to repossess her heart so she can love again. She still dreams of him every night and longs to hold him tight but has decided to move on.

The song was included on multiple compilation albums, including "Honky Tonk Angels" (1996), "God's Honky Tonk Angel: The First Queen of Country Music" (2000), and "Nashville Legend" (2003). It was also covered by Norma Jean on her 1966 album "Norma Jean Sings a Tribute to Kitty Wells".

== See also ==
- Kitty Wells singles discography
