= Singing on Sunday =

Studio album by Kitty Wells
- Released: 1962
- Genre: Gospel
- Label: Decca

Kitty Wells chronology
Queen of Country Music (1961)	Singing on Sunday (1962)	Christmas Day With Kitty Wells (1962)

Singing on Sunday is a gospel album recorded by Kitty Wells and released in 1962 on the Decca label (DL 4270). Thom Owens of Allmusic called it "enjoyable but unexeptional."

== Track listing ==
Side 1

1. "Singing on Sunday" (Roy Botkin)
2. "Paul's Ministry" (William Travel)
3. "Too Far from God" (Johnny Wright, Jack Anglin, Clyde Baum)
4. "Do You Expect a Reward from God" (Johnnie Bailes, Walter Bailes)
5. "The Wings of a Dove" (Bob Ferguson)
6. "The Footsteps of My Lord" (John D. Loudermilk)

Side 2

1. "Wait a Little Longer Please Jesus" (Hazel Houser)
2. "I'll Reap My Harvest in Heaven" (Floyd Jenkins)
3. "How Far Is Heaven" (Jimmie Davis, Tillman Franks)
4. "Gathering Flowers for the Master's Bouquet" (Marvin Baumgardner)
5. "Sinner, Kneel Down and Pray" (Johnnie Bailes)
6. "That Glory Bound Train" (Roy Acuff, Odell McLeod)
