= Queen of Country Music (album) =

Studio album by Kitty Wells
- Released: 1962
- Genre: Country
- Label: Decca

Kitty Wells chronology
Heartbreak U.S.A. (1960)	Queen of Country Music (1962)	Singing on Sunday (1962)

Professional ratings
Review scores
Source	Rating
Record Mirror	4/5 stars

Queen of Country Music is an album recorded by Kitty Wells and released in 1962 on the Decca label (DL 4197). Thom Owens of Allmusic gave the album three stars and called it "a thoroughly enjoyable listen -- even if it doesn't include any hit singles."

== Track listing ==
Side 1

1. "Moody River" (Gary D. Bruce)
2. "What Am I Living For" (Art Harris, Fred Jay)
3. "Pick Me Up on Your Way Down" (Harlan Howard)
4. "Slowly" (Tommy Hill, Webb Pierce)
5. "Wooden Heart" (Ben Weisman, Bert Kaempfert, Fred Wise, Kay Twomey)
6. "Heart Over Mind" (Mel Tillis)

Side 2

1. "Ev'rybody's Somebody's Fool" (Howard Greenfield, Jack Keller)
2. "Am I That Easy to Forget" (Carl Belew, W.S. Stevenson)
3. "One More Time" (Mel Tillis)
4. "Hello Walls" (Willie Nelson)
5. "Your Old Love Letters" (Johnny Bond)
6. "A Fallen Star" (James Joiner)
