= Lenny Dee =

Lenny Dee may refer to:

- Lenny Dee (DJ) (born 1968), New York City-based techno DJ and producer
- Lenny Dee (organist) (1923–2006), American easy listening and space age pop organist
