= Burning Memories (Kitty Wells album) =

Studio album by Kitty Wells
- Released: 1965
- Genre: Country
- Label: Decca

Kitty Wells chronology
Especially for You (1964)	Burning Memories (1965)	Lonesome and Sad Blue (1965)

Burning Memories is an album recorded by Kitty Wells and released in 1965 on the Decca label (DL 4612). The album included the hit single "I'll Repossess My Heart". Thom Owens of Allmusic opined that it "is too uneven in terms of material and is burdened by too many overdubbed vocal chorus and strings to be consistently enjoyable".

== Track listing ==
Side A

1. "Burning Memories" (Mel Tillis, Wayne P. Walker)
2. "I Don't Care (Just as Long as You Love Me)" (Buck Owens)
3. "Everybody Loves Somebody" (Irving Taylor, Ken Lane)
4. "Kill Him with Kindness" (Boudleaux & Felice Bryant)
5. "I Don't Love You Anymore" (Bill Anderson)
6. "I'll Repossess My Heart" (Paul Yandell)

Side B

1. "You Don't Hear" (Jerry Huffman, Tommy Cash)
2. "Six Lonely Hours" (Jim Coleman, Wayne P. Walker)
3. "In the Misty Moonlight" (Cindy Walker)
4. "This Divorce" (Roy Botkin)
5. "I've Got Him Fooled" (Roy Botkin)
6. "You Don't Love Me (But You're Afraid Someone Will)" (Bob Gallion, Glen Douglas)
