= Left to Right =

Song by Kitty Wells
- Released: 1960
- Genre: Country
- Label: Decca
- Songwriter: Lorene Mann

"Left to Right" is a country song written by Lorene Mann and popularized by singer Kitty Wells. The song was released in 1960 on the Decca label (no. 9-31065) with "Memory of Love" as the "B" side. It peaked at No. 5 on Billboard's country and western chart.

The lyrics tell how, at the end of her marriage, the singer says goodbye by moving her wedding ring from her left hand to her right hand "to show that I once possessed your heart." Her husband did her wrong, and she is left with heartache, but she will wear the ring forever, as the diamond continues to shine as bright as the day he gave it.

The song was also included on several albums, including "Kitty Wells' Golden Favorites" (1961), "The Kitty Wells Story" (1963), "Kitty Wells Greatest Hits Vol. 1" (1989), "Kitty Wells Greatest Songs" (1995), and "20 All-Time Greatest Hits" (2004).

== See also ==
- Kitty Wells singles discography
