= Dee-Lightful! =

Dee-Lightful

Studio album by Lenny Dee
- Released: 1955
- Genre: Traditional pop instrumental
- Label: Decca

Lenny Dee chronology
Dee-Lightful (1955)	Dee-Lirious (1956)

Professional ratings
Review scores
Source	Rating
Billboard	4/5 stars

Dee-Lightful is a studio album released by Lenny Dee in 1955 on Decca LP record DL 8114 and 45 rpm extended play set ED-735.

== Background ==
Organist Dee had an instrumental hit single in February 1955 with his composition Plantation Boogie. This, his first album, contained that recording and Dee's interpretations of standards. A 45 rpm extended play set was also issued, but missing four selections that appear on the 12-inch LP.

== Reception ==
Billboard predicted that the album would be a "big seller", noting the large number of unusual sonic effects created on the organ, as well as the vivacity of Dee's playing. Cashbox listed the album as high as ninth on their album charts. On the Billboard albums chart, the album peaked at No. 11.

== Track listing ==
No.	Title	Length
1.	"Plantation Boogie" (Lenny Dee)
2.	"Laura" (David Raksin - Johnny Mercer)
3.	"Yes Sir, That's My Baby" (Walter Donaldson - Gus Kahn)
4.	"The Birth of the Blues" (Ray Henderson - Buddy G. DeSylva - Lew Brown)
5.	"Little Brown Jug" ((no credit given))
6.	"September Song" (Maxwell Anderson - Kurt Weill)
7.	"Ballin' the Jack" (Jim Burris - Chris Smith)
8.	"Exactly Like You" (Jimmy McHugh - Dorothy Fields)
9.	"Siboney" (Ernesto Lecuona)
10.	"Sweet Georgia Brown" (Ben Bernie - Maceo Pinkard - Kenneth Casey)
11.	"The World Is Waiting for the Sunrise" (Eugene Lockhart - Ernest Seitz)
12.	"The Donkey Serenade" (Rudolph Friml - Herbert Stothart - B. Wright - C. Forrest)
