= Mommy for a Day =

Song by Kitty Wells
- Released: 1959
- Genre: Country
- Label: Decca
- Songwriters: Harlan Howard, Buck Owens

"Mommy for a Day" is a country song written by Harlan Howard and Buck Owens and popularized by singer Kitty Wells. The song was released in 1959 on the Decca label (record no. 9-30804, 45-105865) with "All the Time" as the "B" side. It peaked at No. 5 on Billboard's country and western chart. It ranked at No. 37 on Billboard year-end top 50 country & western singles of 1959.

The song's lyrics tell of a mother visiting her little girl on a Sunday afternoon after the father decided that she could not come home. The mother loves the father, but he believes the lies that have ruined their home. The little girl is too young to understand and wants to know when mommy's coming home. At the end of the visit, the mother kisses the little girl goodbye, walks away with a broken heart over having to be "a Mommy for a day."

John Rumble, senior historian at the Country Music Hall of Fame and Museum, said of the song: "She was emotional, even tearful at times, but it was restrained. There was no emotional excess, no self-pity -- it was just a lot of pain she was singing about in being 'Mommy For a Day.'"

Music critic Eric Siegel rated the song at No. 4 on his list country music's top 10 "mama songs." He wrote: "Ms. Wells's rich voice has never been more poignant than in this evocation of the feelings of a mother who only gets to see her little girl on Sunday afternoons since her husband kicked her out of the house because he thought she was cheating on him."

The song has appeared on multiple compilation albums, including "The Kitty Wells Story" (1963), "Country Music Hall of Fame Series" (1991), "Queen of Country Music" (1994), "God's Honky Tonk Angel: The First Queen of Country Music" (2000), "The Best of Kitty Wells: The Millennium Collection" (2002), and "Kitty Wells The Collection" (2003).

== See also ==
- Kitty Wells singles discography
