= Johnnie & Jack =

Musical group

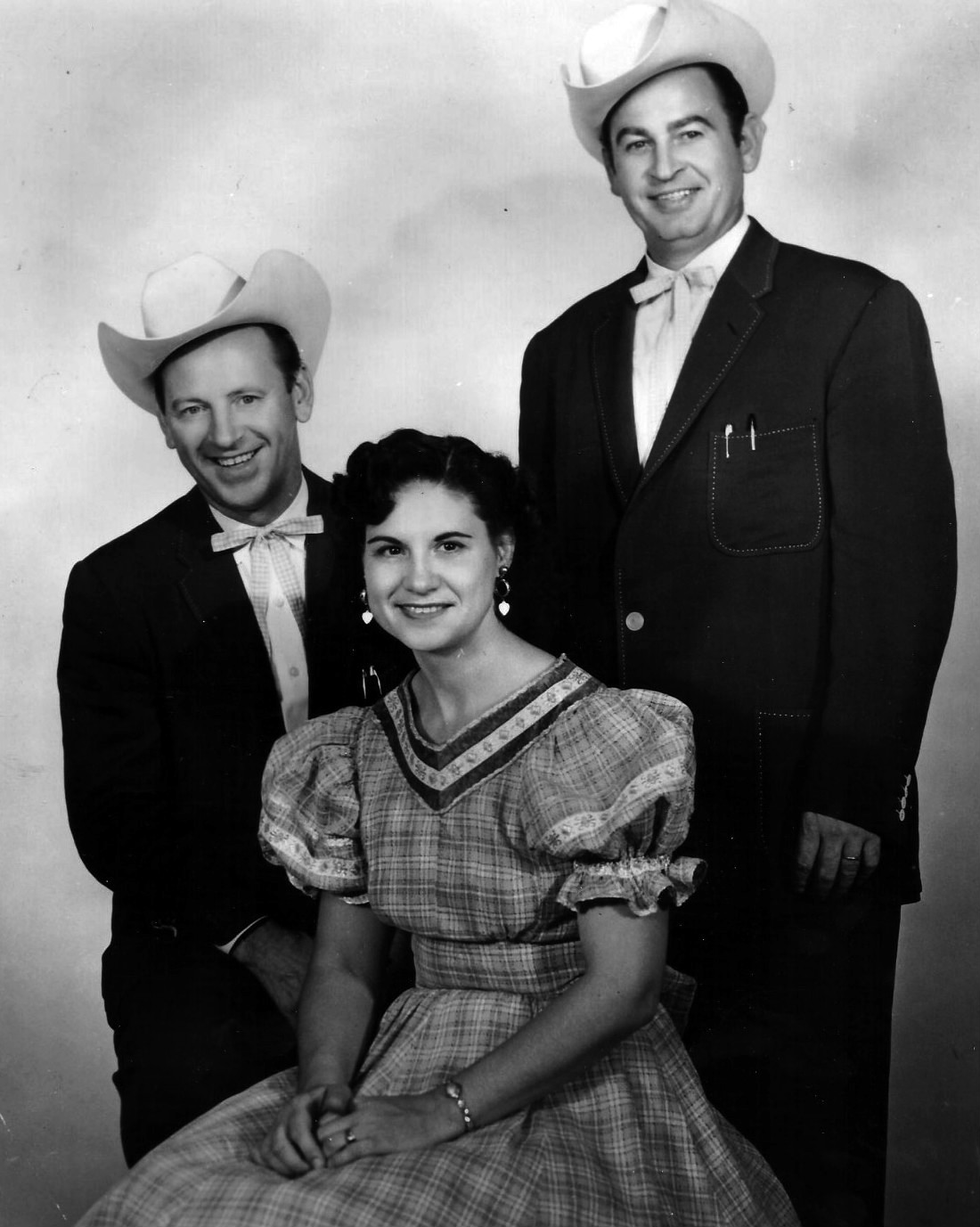
- Johnnie (left) and Jack (right) with Kitty Wells (center)

Background information
- Origin: Tennessee, United States
- Genres: Country
- Years active: 1938–1963
- Label: RCA Victor
- Past members: Jack Anglin; Johnnie Wright

Johnnie & Jack were an American country music duo, composed of Johnnie Wright (1914–2011) and Jack Anglin (1916–1963). The duo became members of the Grand Ole Opry in the 1940s. Between 1951 and 1962, the duo released several singles on the RCA Victor Records label, including their version of "Goodnite, Sweetheart, Goodnite" which peaked at No. 4 on the Best Seller charts, and the No. 1 "(Oh Baby Mine) I Get So Lonely".

Following Anglin's death in a car crash in 1963, Wright became a solo artist, topping the country charts in 1965 with "Hello Vietnam".

Johnnie & Jack were posthumously inducted into the Volunteer State Music Hall of Fame in 2025.

== Discography ==
=== Albums ===
Year	Album	Label
1957	The Tennessee Mountain Boys	RCA Victor
1959	Hits by Johnnie & Jack	RCA Victor
1962	Smiles and Tears	Decca

=== Singles ===
Year	Single	Chart Positions
Year	Single	US Country
1951	"Poison Love"	4
1951	"Cryin' Heart Blues"	5
1952	"Three Ways of Knowing"	7
1954	"(Oh Baby Mine) I Get So Lonely"	1
1954	"Goodnight, Sweetheart, Goodnight"	4
1954	"Honey, I Need You"	15
1954	"Beware of 'It'"	9
1954	"Kiss-Crazy Baby"	7
1955	"No One Dear but You"	14
1955	"S.O.S."	15
1956	"I Want to Be Loved" (with Ruby Wells)	13
1958	"Stop the World (And Let Me Off)"	7
1958	"Lonely Island Pearl"	18
1959	"Sailor Man"	16
1962	"Slow Poison"	17
