= Especially for You (Kitty Wells album) =

Studio album by Kitty Wells
- Released: 1964
- Genre: Country
- Label: Decca

Kitty Wells chronology
Country Music Time (1964)	Especially for You (1964)	Burning Memories (1965)

Professional ratings
Review scores
Source	Rating
Record Mirror	3/5 stars

Especially for You is an album recorded by Kitty Wells and released in 1964 on the Decca label (DL 4493). The album included three hit singles: "Unloved Unwanted", "Will Your Lawyer Talk to God", and "We Missed You". Thom Owens of Allmusic called the album "an exceptional mid-'60s LP."

== Track listing ==
Side A

1. "Act Naturally"
2. "Guilty"
3. "Busted"
4. "We Missed You"
5. "Ring of Fire "
6. "Cold and Lonely (Is the Forecast for Tonight)"

Side B

1. "Talk Back Trembling Lips"
2. "Make the World Go Away"
3. "Take These Chains from My Heart"
4. "The Window Up Above"
5. "Unloved Unwanted"
6. "Will Your Lawyer Talk to God"
