= Hello Vietnam =

Single by Johnnie Wright

from the album Hello Vietnam
- B-side: "Mexico City"
- Released: 1965
- Recorded: 1965
- Genre: Country
- Length: 3:06
- Label: Decca
- Songwriter: Tom T. Hall
- Producer: Owen Bradley

Johnnie Wright singles chronology
"Blame It on the Moonlight" (1965)	"Hello Vietnam" (1965)	"Keep the Flag Flying" (1965)

"Hello Vietnam" is a song written by Tom T. Hall and recorded by American country singer Johnnie Wright in 1965. Its lyrics supported the Vietnam War. "Hello Vietnam" spent 20 weeks on the American Billboard Hot Country Singles & Tracks chart with three weeks at number one. The single, featuring vocals from Wright's wife, Kitty Wells, was Wright's most successful release on the US country music charts as a solo singer.

The song was used for the opening theme of the war film Full Metal Jacket. It was also used in the third part of Ken Burns' documentary series The Vietnam War.

== Chart performance ==
Chart (1965)	Peak position
U.S. Billboard Hot Country Singles	1
