= Password (Kitty Wells song) =

Single by Kitty Wells
- Released: 1964
- Genre: Country
- Label: Decca
- Songwriter(s): Herman Phillips

"Password" is a song written by Herman Phillips, sung by Kitty Wells, and released on the Decca label. It was released in June 1964 and peaked in October 1964 at No. 4 on Billboard's hot country singles chart. It spent 23 weeks on the chart. It was one of Wells' singles to sell over a million copies.

The song was also included on the 1991 Country Music Hall of Fame Series album of Wells' greatest hits.
