= Jack Anglin =

American country music singer (1916–1963)

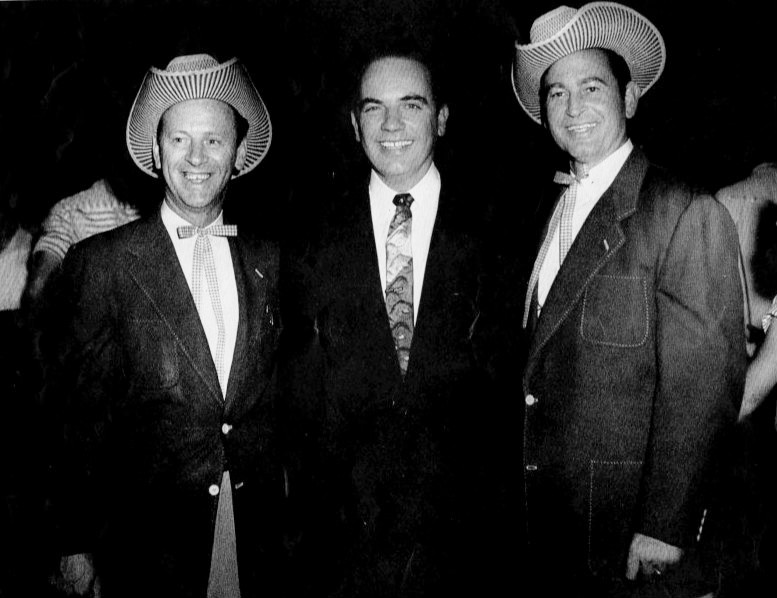
- Jack Anglin (right) with Johnnie Wright and Governor of Tennessee Frank Clement

Background information
- Born: May 13, 1916; Williamson County, Tennessee, U.S.
- Died: March 8, 1963 (aged 46); Madison, Tennessee, U.S.
- Genres: Country music
- Occupation: singer
- Years active: 1938–1963
- Formerly of: The Anglin Brothers; Johnnie & Jack

Jack Anglin (May 13, 1916 – March 8, 1963) was an American country music singer best known as a member of the Anglin Brothers, and later Johnnie & Jack with Johnnie Wright.

== Younger Years ==
Anglin was born on a farm in Franklin, Tennessee to John B. and Lue (née Tucker) Anglin. Jack was taught to play guitar by his father at a young age. By the time he was fourteen, Jack was singing and playing guitar on local radio stations even though he could not read music. In 1930, a young Anglin moved off the family farm to Nashville, Tennessee in hopes of pursuing his dreams of becoming a musician. Jack and his brothers Van and Jim began performing as the Anglin Twins and Red. Once the trio's music was picked up by southern radio stations, the group changed names to The Anglin Brothers. The family band would later disband in 1939.

== Early career ==
Around the time the brotherly band separated, Jack worked at a local hosiery mill and became acquainted with his future wife, Louise; and through her, her brother, Johnnie Wright. At the time Wright, his wife Murial (Kitty Wells) and Louise were regulars on WSIX-AM as Johnnie Wright and the Harmony Girls. Jack joined Wright's side performance as "Johnnie Wright and the Happy Roving Cowboys, now with Jack Anglin". Wright and Anglin first performed together live as a duo at a concert benefit for victims of the Louisville/ Nashville flood of 1936 under the stage name The Backwater Boys, following the Harmony Girls' performance. Johnnie and Jack shared a connection much stronger than a shared birth date. Following that performance, Wright and Anglin decided to make their partnership official and formed the "Johnnie and Jack" music duo for which they became famous. The group was known for their combination of somber lyrics, homey harmonies, and true southern American beats. Anglin played the rhythm guitar and tenor vocals, while Wright took the lead. Anglin impressed audiences with his incorporation of the gourd as a musical instrument in some of their songs. For eleven years the duo was signed with RCA Victor records. They signed their final contract with Decca Records.

== Fame ==
Johnnie and Jack toured locally around Tennessee until 1940 when they decided to take their show on the road. To pay for the travel, Johnnie Wright sold his carpentry tools for gas money. Ironically, two years later the group broke up due to a dispute over gas money. Jack Anglin went back to Nashville and began performing at the Grand Ole Opry as part of Roy Acuff's Smoky Mountain Boys band. Anglin played with the band for six months before World War II broke out, and Jack decided to enlist in the United States Army. After four years in Europe, Anglin discharged as a medical orderly sergeant from the medical corps. Following his return from service, Johnnie and Jack began touring together again. In an effort to solidify their position in the southern country music world, Johnnie and Jack founded the Louisiana Hayride Barn show in 1947. The hard work paid off as the duo became permanent residents of the Grand Ole Opry in 1952. Beginning their tour with the Opry, Johnnie and Jack performed together over 3,000 times throughout five countries traveling 100,000 miles a year and writing over 100 songs. Known for their "fast-moving and fun" routines, audiences paid seventy-five cents per person to hear the brotherly folk duet sing some of their "love gone wrong hits such as "Poison Love", "Crying Heart Blues", "Ashes of Love", and "Hummingbird".

== Death ==
On March 8, 1963, Anglin veered off New Due West Avenue, down a ditch twelve foot deep into a tree in Madison, Tennessee. Jack Anglin's death was a blow to the country music community. Earlier that week, four other members of the Grand Ole Opry perished in a plane crash. On the morning of his death, Anglin first attended the joint services of Cowboy Copas and Randy Hughes then the memorial for Hawkshaw Hawkins before heading to the barbershop to prepare for Patsy Cline's memorial service. It was the hair-cut that made Jack Anglin late and put him in a rush to get to Cline's service on time, causing him to speed and lose control of his vehicle. Jack Anglin died on impact of a fractured skull. Anglin was buried in Goodlettsville, Tennessee, in the same cemetery as Cowboy Copas. In his 1993 memoir, By The Seat of my Pants, musician Buddy Killen claimed Jack Anglin was headed the opposite direction of the funeral and did not die in the crash. No evidence has ever been produced to support his outlandish claim, except for the conversation between Buddy and Johnnie Wright, where Johnnie told Buddy to let it go at the funeral. Jack left behind his young son Terry and wife Louise. Two weeks prior to his death, Jack Anglin and Johnnie Wright had released two new songs they hoped to soon take on the road. Following his death, in 1983 his family opened a museum in honor of his musical legacy on Old Hickory Boulevard. In the late twentieth century, two of Jack Anglin's songs were used as soundtracks to the television shows The Marty Stuart Show and God's Bloody Acre- Kitty Wells.
