= Will Your Lawyer Talk to God =

Single by Kitty Wells
- B-side: "The Big Letdown"
- Released: 1962
- Genre: Country
- Label: Decca
- Songwriter(s): Harlan Howard, Richard Johnson

"Will Your Lawyer Talk To God" is a song written by Harlan Howard and Richard Johnson, sung by Kitty Wells, and released on the Decca label. In September 1962, it peaked at No. 8 on Billboard's country and western juke box chart. It spent 11 weeks on the chart.

Upon its release, Billboard in May 1962 called it a fine side, "a tale of divorce and heartbreak, sold by the thrush with feeling" and with "first-rate" backings.

Prior to the 1940s, divorce was a taboo topic in popular music. "Will Your Lawyer Talk To God" was one of the early songs to address the topic explicitly, along with Hank Snow's "Married by the Bible, Divorced by the Law". The song explored the contrasting approaches to divorce by "manmade laws" and "the final judgment" of God. It opened with this passage:

Your lawyer called and said he had the papers all prepared
To sign my name was all I had to do
He saw the judge now he's seen me, there's only one thing left
Will your lawyer talk to God for you?
Will your lawyer talk to God and plead your case up on high

Originally released as a single in 1962, the song was later released on Wells' 1964 album Especially for You. It was also included on the 1991 Country Music Hall of Fame Series album of Wells' greatest hits.

Dottie West covered the song on the 1965 album "Queens of Country Music."

Songs of divorce became more popular in the 1960s as Tammy Wynette released her hit, "D-I-V-O-R-C-E", in 1968.
