= Heartbreak U.S.A. =

Single by Kitty Wells

from the album Heartbreak U.S.A.
- B-side: "There Must Be Another Way to Live"
- Released: April 1961
- Genre: Country
- Length: 2:35
- Label: Decca
- Songwriter(s): Harlan Howard
- Producer(s): Owen Bradley

Kitty Wells singles chronology
"The Other Cheek" (1961)	"Heartbreak U.S.A." (1961)	"Day Into Night" (1961)

"Heartbreak U.S.A." is a 1961 song by Kitty Wells. The single became one of Wells' most successful releases as a solo artist. "Heartbreak U.S.A." was Kitty Wells' third and final number one on the US country singles chart, staying at the top spot for four weeks during a twenty-three week chart run. The B-side of "Heartbreak U.S.A.", entitled "There Must Be Another Way to Live", reached number twenty on the country chart.

== Chart performance ==
Chart (1961)	Peak position
U.S. Billboard Hot C&W Sides	1

== Cover versions ==
Jeanne Black released a version of the song as a single in November 1961, but it did not chart.

Dottie West recorded a cover in 1964.
