= Johnnie Wright =

American country music singer-songwriter (1914–2011)

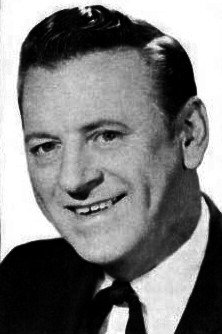
- Wright in 1964
- Born: Johnnie Robert Wright Jr. May 13, 1914; Mount Juliet, Tennessee, U.S.
- Died: September 27, 2011 (aged 97); Madison, Tennessee, U.S.
- Occupation: Singer-songwriter
- Years active: 1939–2000
- Spouse: Kitty Wells (m. 1937)
- Children: 3, including Ruby and Bobby
- Musical career
- Genres: Country
- Instruments: Vocals, guitar
- Labels: Decca, Rubocca
- Formerly of: Johnnie & Jack

Johnnie Robert Wright Jr. (May 13, 1914 – September 27, 2011) was an American country music singer-songwriter, who spent much of his career working with Jack Anglin as the popular duo Johnnie & Jack, and was also the husband of country music star Kitty Wells.

== Biography ==
=== Early life and career ===
Born in Mount Juliet, Tennessee, United States, Wright first performed with Anglin in 1936. On October 30, 1937, he married Kitty Wells. The two, along with Wright's sister Louise, performed as Johnnie Wright & the Harmony Girls. In 1939, Wright and Anglin formed the duo Johnnie & Jack. They teamed up full-time in the 1940s and, except for the time Anglin spent overseas during World War II, remained together for more than two decades.

In 1952, Johnnie & Jack's "Poison Love" took them to the Grand Ole Opry, where the duo, along with Wells, were invited to join and where they remained for 15 years. Following Anglin's death in an automobile accident in 1963, Wright continued performing and releasing records. After his name was misspelled on a record label, Wright changed his name from Johnnie to Johnny.

Johnnie Wright was a founding member of the Country Music Association and turned down the offer to be its first president. He was also involved in the effort to build the Country Music Hall of Fame. Although, Wright has not yet been inducted into the Hall of Fame.

In 1964, he and his Tennessee Mountain Boys had a Top 25 hit with "Walkin', Talkin', Cryin', Barely Beatin' Broken Heart". The following year, he had success with the Tom T. Hall-penned, "Hello Vietnam", a No. 1 hit. In 1968, he and Wells recorded an autobiographical duet, "We'll Stick Together", and continued playing live shows together through 2007.

=== Later years ===
In 1983, Wright and Wells opened the Family Country Junction Museum and Studio in their hometown of Madison, Tennessee. They closed the museum in October 2000, but their grandson, John Sturdivant Jr. kept the Junction Recording Studio operating.

Director Stanley Kubrick included Wright's song "Hello Vietnam" in the soundtrack for the 1987 film, Full Metal Jacket.

Wright joined producers Randall Franks and Alan Autry for the 1991 CD Christmas Time's A Comin' featuring the cast of the TV series, In the Heat of the Night. He performed along with Kitty Wells and Bobby Wright on "Jingle Bells", with the rest of the cast.

On December 31, 2000, the duo performed their farewell concert at the Nashville Nightlife Theater in Nashville, Tennessee. They played to a full house of fans, family and friends that included Ricky Skaggs, The Whites, Marty Stuart, Connie Smith, Leona Williams, Tommy Cash, Jack Greene, Jean Shepard and comedian-impressionist, Johnny Counterfit.

=== Personal life ===
Kitty Wells and Johnnie Wright were married on October 30, 1937. Together they had three children, Ruby (1939–2009), Bobby., and Carol Sue. Each of their children enjoyed minor success individually as recording artists. Ruby, with a hit called "Dern 'Ya", an "answer song" to Roger Miller's "Dang Me"; and Bobby, with a series of country-pop hits in the early to mid-1970s, including "Seasons in the Sun" (covering Terry Jacks' No. 1 pop hit from 1974). Carol Sue, on a mid-1950s duet with Wells, titled "How Far is Heaven". Carol Sue and Ruby also had success with a pop hit as The Wright Sisters with "That's Ok" in the early 1960s. All three children performed as part of their parents' road show, while growing up.

Johnnie Wright died at his home of natural causes in Madison, Tennessee on September 27, 2011, exactly two years after older daughter Ruby's death; 33 days short of his 74th wedding anniversary with Wells; and on the same day as fellow country singer-songwriter "Country" Johnny Mathis. Wright had been in failing health for some time. He was survived by his wife of 73 years and their two surviving children Bobby and Carol Sue, plus eight grandchildren, 12 great-grandchildren, and three great-great-grandchildren.

Wright's widow Kitty Wells followed him in death less than ten months later on July 16, 2012. He is interred at Spring Hill Cemetery in Nashville, Tennessee.

== Discography ==
=== Albums ===
Year	Album details	US Country
1965	Hello Vietnam: Released: October 1965; Label: Decca Records	5
1966	Country Music Special: Released: June 1966; Label: Decca Records	40
1967	Country… The Wright Way: Released: June 1967; Label: Decca Records	—
1968	Johnnie Wright Sings Country Favorites: Released: 1968; Label: Decca Records	—
1968	We'll Stick Together (with Kitty Wells): Released: August 1968; Label: Decca Records	30
1972	Kitty Wells & Johnny Wright Sing; Heartwarming Gospel Songs (with Kitty Wells): Released: January 1972; Label: Decca Records	—
1980	Johnnie Wright: Released: 1980; Label: Rubocca	—

=== Singles ===
Year	Single	US Country	US Cash Box Country	Album
1963	"Sweet Snow Dear"	—	40	Hello Vietnam
1964	"Walkin', Talkin', Cryin', Barely Beatin' Broken Heart"	22	41	Hello Vietnam
1964	"Don't Give Up the Ship"	37	—	Hello Vietnam
1965	"Blame It on the Moonlight"	28	31	Hello Vietnam
1965	"Hello Vietnam"	1	1	Hello Vietnam
1965	"Keep the Flag Flying"	31	9	Country Music Special
1966	"Nickels, Quarters and Dimes"	31	28	Country Music Special
1966	"I'm Doing This for Daddy"	53	44	Country… The Wright Way
1966	"Mama's Little Jewel"	50	42	Country… The Wright Way
1967	"Ole Honky Tonk"	—	50	Johnnie Wright Sings Country Favorites
1967	"American Power"	66	32	non-album single
1967	"Music to Cry By"	69	—	Johnnie Wright Sings Country Favorites
1968	"Atlanta Georgia Baby"	—	—	Johnnie Wright Sings Country Favorites
1968	"We'll Stick Together" (with Kitty Wells)	54	25	We'll Stick Together
1968	"(They Always Come Out) Smellin' Like a Rose"	66	58	non-album singles
1969	"Love Ain't Gonna Die (I'm Gonna Have to Kill It)"	—	—	non-album singles
1969	"Sing a Song About Love"	—	—	non-album singles
1970	"A Dear John Letter"	—	—	non-album singles
1970	"Love Everybody"	—	—	non-album singles
1970	"Where the Heart Aches Hang Around"	—	—	non-album singles
1971	"Old Honky Tonk"	—	—	non-album singles
1971	"High Cost of Livin'"	—	—	non-album singles
1971	"South in New Orleans"	—	—	non-album singles
1972	"Doo-Hickey"	—	—	non-album singles
1972	"Don't Let the Stars Get in Your Eyes"	—	—	non-album singles
1973	"Ode to a Country Bar"	—	—	non-album singles
1974	"Wild Passionate Lover"	—	—	non-album singles
1976	"I Never Told Him I Loved You"	—	—	non-album singles
1980	"Pressure"	—	—	Johnnie Wright
1982	"Just a Simple Bouquet"	—	—	non-album singles
1984	"The King Went on a Journey"	—	—	non-album singles
