= Lenny Dee (organist) =

American organist (1923–2006)

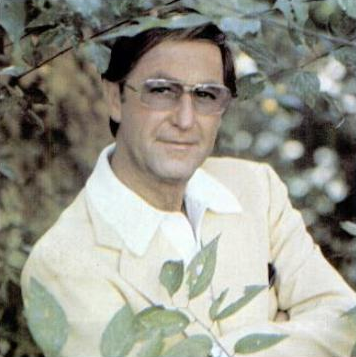
- Dee in 1974

Background information
- Born: Leonard George DeStoppelaire; January 5, 1923; Chicago, Illinois, U.S.
- Died: February 12, 2006 (aged 83) St. Petersburg, Florida, U.S.
- Genres: Space age pop, easy listening, Nashville sound, boogie-woogie, swing
- Occupation: Organist
- Instrument: Hammond organ
- Labels: Decca, MCA

Leonard George DeStoppelaire (January 5, 1923 – February 12, 2006), better known as Lenny Dee, was an American virtuoso organist who played many styles of music. His record albums were among the most popular of easy listening and space age pop organists of the 1950s through the early 1980s. His signature hit, "Plantation Boogie", charted as a Top 20 hit in 1955. He also had a gold record with 1970's Spinning Wheel.

Dee played a variety of songs in numerous styles. He played original compositions, popular songs, and novelty tunes, and was a master of improvisation. Although his unique style was a pop/boogie-woogie blend, he also played ballads, country and western, jazz, rock, and patriotic songs.

== Biography ==
=== Early years ===
Born in Chicago, Illinois, United States, As a child, he sang in his church's choir; he also played ukulele, banjo and accordion. As a teenager, he turned playing the accordion into a profession in his uncle's quartet, which he continued until he volunteered into the Navy during World War II in 1943 aboard the aircraft carrier USS Lexington.

Upon his return from service, Dee spent his Navy earnings on a Hammond Model A organ, one of the earliest of its kind. With money from the G.I. Bill, he received instruction in organ at the Chicago Conservatory of Music. Afterwards, he began playing hotels and night clubs in the south in the late 1940s to some degree of success, but no record contracts.

=== Decca/MCA years ===
It was not until the early 1950s that Dee was signed up to Decca after country singer Red Foley heard him playing at the Plantation Inn in Nashville, Tennessee, and thought Dee's unique sound would be a good contrast to the label's then prominent organist, Ethel Smith.

Dee made good, and his original composition "Plantation Boogie" charted at No. 19 in 1955. Dee re-recorded the hit on numerous albums, and was often imitated, even plagiarized, but never duplicated. Dee wrote "Chicken in the Rough", and recorded the song as a duet with saxophonist Boots Randolph. The uncanny similarity of "Yakety Sax" to Dee's "Chicken in the Rough" is often noted.

Dee ventured into recording albums for Decca starting in 1954 with his first LP, Dee-lightful. Part of Dee's charm was his albums' zany covers featuring Dee in various situations, and titles with puns that usually included his name, such as Dee-Lirious, Dee-Licious, and Dee-Most! Dee recorded dozens of albums for Decca, which sold moderately well although only three of them managed to hit the Billboard Hot 200 album chart; like many easy-listening instrumental artists of the day, he had a following that bought his albums over the years, but rarely rushed out to buy them when newly released so that they would make the chart. His recordings featured organ with other instruments, that were produced by Owen Bradley and developed into the Nashville sound and country pop of the 1970s and 1980s. Dee was nearly always backed by percussion; depending on the song, he also recorded with guitarists, Les Paul and Chet Atkins; bass; a backup chorus; strings; horns such as saxophones, trombones, trumpets; and even the banjo. Dee played various instruments, and was influential in the history of organs and keyboards. Dee was recognized for his contribution to the field of music by Time Life for what Dee described as "bringing the organ out of the church and into mainstream music".

When Dee married his second wife, Hendrica, in 1960, the couple settled down in Sarasota and eventually St. Petersburg, Florida, which would become the base of Dee's operations for the rest of his career. They had two children: Raymond and Georgia. Lenny Dee Jr., his drummer, was one of three children from his first marriage (Betty), daughters are Barbara and Linda.

Despite his contract with Decca, Dee's first love was live performance. Dee loved people and he loved to entertain them with music and laughter. In the mid-1950s, he performed for several summers at the Lake Breeze Hotel lounge, at Buckeye Lake, just east of Columbus, Ohio. Around 1960, he played for a few years at a lounge in Fort Lauderdale, Florida. During the 1960s and 1970s, St. Petersburg Beach was a popular vacation destination, complete with an early theme park and a few luxury resorts. In 1967, after performing regularly at Davy Jones Locker, and later in hotel super clubs at St. Petersburg Beach such as the Desert Ranch and Dolphin Beach resorts, Dee started his own up-scale supper club, named Lenny Dee's Dolphin Den. He held two shows each night with full bands playing dancing music between shows, and he packed the supper club nightly. Dee was a significant attraction to St. Petersburg Beach for decades. In the 1980s, he later opened Lenny Dee's King's Inn a few miles away. His supper club format — with dinner, drinks, opening acts and his musical and his comedy routines — was popular with local fans and visitors from around the world. The supper club's menu included the "One Pound Pork Chop", along with other high-end steak house selections.

Although he was not a country music performer per se (his work fell more into the easy listening category), his stage act included comedy typical of the Nashville country music entertainment genre, with jokes and changing the lyrics of songs, and routines that Dee was noted for, such as making realistic sounds of trains, whistles, and waves of water with the organ while wearing wild hats as costume. A lover of animals, Dee often included his pet dog, a black toy poodle he owned named "Little Miss Muffett", in his routine. The dog was trained to bark along with some of his numbers and smiled on queue. His beloved Miss Muffett lived to be 17; she had kept him company while he traveled on the road earlier in his career. Fans continued to ask him about the dog long after she had died.

His television credits include appearances on Toast of the Town with Ed Sullivan, The Tonight Show with Jack Paar, The Lawrence Welk Show, and later Nashville Now. Dee even had his own show in the mid-1950s on WFLA-TV in Tampa, Florida called Ladies' Day with Lenny Dee; it enjoyed a brief run.

=== Later years ===
Dee continued recording into the early 1980s, adding a background orchestra in the late 1960s as many other easy listening performers were doing at the time. By the late 1970s, Dee was in less demand. After recording 56 albums, he was finally released from the MCA label, along with many other easy listening artists. Time Life honored him for his 1950's contribution to music, including his recording of "A Foggy Day (In London Town) - Lenny Dee" on the CD Instrumental Favorites - Around the World (A Time Life Collection).

Dee spent the rest of his career at his night clubs and on tour, but the demand for his music continued to decline. In 1999, Dee played on a series of cruise ship tours. He retired in 2003. He died at home on February 12, 2006, in St. Petersburg, aged 83.

== Instruments ==
After his discharge from the Navy, Dee bought a Hammond Model A organ. He later customized this instrument with a Hammond Solovox, a Maas-Rowe Vibrachord, and Leslie speakers (model 31-H). He also had a tape echo built into his organ, allowing him to create his trademark re-echo sound.

In the early 1960s, Dee recorded on a Wurlitzer organ overdubbed with his Hammond Model A. In 1967, he started recording on a Hammond X-66; in 1972, he switched to a Hammond Concorde. In the 1970s, he also recorded on Yamaha and Thomas organs. Other keyboards he used include the Hammond Piper, which he used for its trumpet and harpsichord sounds, and the ARP synthesizer.

When he toured on a cruise ship towards the end of his life, he played a Hammond Elegante (the digital version made by Hammond Suzuki, model number XH-272).

== Posthumous releases ==
Since his death, three compilation CDs have been released. Golden Organ Memories, a two-disc set, was released by Universal in 1998. Jasmine Records issued two additional compilations. Double Dee-Light was released in 2006 and features 48 tracks on two discs, including Plantation Boogie. This collection features songs from his earliest albums, including Dee-Lightful, Dee-Lirious, Dee-Licious, and Dee-Most!. The second Jasmine compilation, In Dee-Mand, released in 2008, features 57 tracks on two discs. It includes tracks from Hi-Dee Fi, Dee-Day, and Mr. Dee Goes to Town, as well as nine singles.

== Discography ==
- Dee-Lightful!, Decca DL 8114
- Dee-Lirious, Decca DL 8165
- Dee-Licious, Decca DL 8275
- Dee-Most!, Decca DL 8308
- Hi-Dee-Fi, Decca DL 8406
- Mr. Dee Goes To Town, Decca DL 8497
- Dee-Beat! Decca ED 2552 (45 EP Album)
- Dee-Day!, Decca, DL 8628
- Dee-Frosting, Decca ED 2613 (45 EP Album)
- Dee-Latin Hi-Fi Organ, Decca DL 8718
- Mellow-Dee Decca, DL 78796
- Lenny Dee Plays The Hits, Decca DL 78857
- The Lenny Dee Show, Decca DL 78913
- Songs Everybody Knows, Decca DL 78978
- Golden Organ Favorites, Decca DL 74112
- Happy Holi-Dee, Decca DL 74146
- Lenny Dee In Hollywood, Decca DL 74315
- Lenny Dee Down South, Decca DL 74365
- By Popular Dee-Mand, Decca DL 74429
- Something Special, Decca DL 74498
- Most Requested!, Decca DL 74572
- Sweethearts On Parade, Decca DL 74632
- The Lenny Dee Tour, Decca DL 74654
- My Favorite Things, Decca DL 74706
- In The Mood, Decca DL 74818
- Moving On!, Decca DL 74880
- Relaxin', Decca DL 74946
- Gentle On My Mind, Decca DL 74994 charted #196 on Billboard Hot 200
- The Best Of Lenny Dee, Decca DL DXSB 7199 (Double Record Set)
- Turn Around, Look At Me, Decca DL 75073 charted #199 on Hot 200
- Little Green Apples, Decca DL 75112
- Here's Lenny Dee At The Organ, Vocalion VL 73782
- Spinning Wheel, Decca DL 75152 charted #189 on Hot 200
- Easy Come, Easy Go, Decca DL 75196
- Remember Me, Decca DL 75255
- Easy Loving, Decca DL 75320
- Where Is The Love, Decca DL 75366
- Organ Special, Vocalion VL 73817
- Organ Varieties, Vocalion VL 73819
- Double Star Series Featuring Lenny Dee & Earl Grant, MCA Special Products 734702
- Lenny Dee, MCA MCA 334
- Lenny Dee, MCA MCA 379
- Steppin' Out With Lenny Dee, MCA MCA 455
- City Lights, MCA MCA 476
- Remember When, MCA MAP 1131 (mono), MAPS 1131 (stereo) Released 1970
- The Best Of Lenny Dee Vol.II, MCA MCA2 4084 (Double Record Set)
- Lenny Dee Featuring I'll Play For You, MCA MCA 2162
- Take It To The Limit, MCA MCA 2200
- Misty Blue, MCA MCA 2236
- Organ Magic, MCA MCA 2301
- Organ Celebration, MCA MCA 2370
- Treasury Of Favorites, Suffolk Marketing, Inc. SMI I-74
- Melodies Of Love, Suffolk Marketing, Inc. SMI I-75

=== Reissues ===
- Golden Organ Memories, Good Music Record Company MSD2 37209 (2-CD Set)
- Double Dee-Light, Jasmine JASCD 427 (2-CD Set)
- In Dee-Mand, Jasmine (2-CD set)

== Videography ==
- Mr. Entertainer: The Lenny Dee Show, (no video company name) (video, app. 90 min.)
- Mr. Entertainer II, (no video company name) (video)
- Lenny Dee: The Man And His Music, Showcase Productions SP 111 (video, 95 min.)
