= The Kitty Wells Story =

Studio album by Kitty Wells
- Released: 1963
- Genre: Country
- Label: Decca

Kitty Wells chronology
Christmas Day With Kitty Wells (1962)	The Kitty Wells Story (1963)	Country Music Time (1964)

The Kitty Wells Story is a double album consisting of re-recordings of the greatest hits of Kitty Wells. It was released in 1963 on the Decca label (DXSB 7174).

The album peaked at No. 7 on the newly created Billboard Top Country Albums chart.

== Reception ==
On the album's release in 1963, music critic Bill Hitch wrote: "Heartbreak is the trademark of this singing and Kitty's simple, plaintive vocalising calls a spade a spade and reduces the problem of love to basic terms."

Thom Owens of Allmusic called it "a strong compilation" that "remains entertaining."

The Rolling Stone Album Guide gave the album three stars and cautioned that the collection consisted of "re-recordings that find Wells fully embracing the Nashville Sound, with strings and vocal choruses supplanting the basic band as the dominant texture."

== Track listing ==
Side 1

1. "It Wasn't God Who Made Honky Tonk Angels"
2. "I Heard the Juke Box Playing"
3. "A Wedding Ring Ago"
4. "Paying for That Back Street Affair"
5. "I Don't Claim to Be an Angel"
6. "Whose Shoulder Will You Cry On"

Side 2

1. "I Gave My Wedding Dress Away "
2. "Release Me"
3. "After Dark"
4. "Lonely Side of Town"
5. "Making Believe"
6. "Searching (For Someone Like You)"

Side C

1. "Repenting"
2. "Your Wild Life's Gonna Get You Down"
3. "Three Ways (To Love You)"
4. "She's No Angel"
5. "Touch and Go Heart"
6. "Jealousy"

Side D

1. "I Can't Help Wondering"
2. "Mommy For A Day"
3. "Amigo's Guitar"
4. "All The Time"
5. "The Other Cheek"
6. "Left To Right"
