= Kitty Wells =

American country music singer (1919–2012)

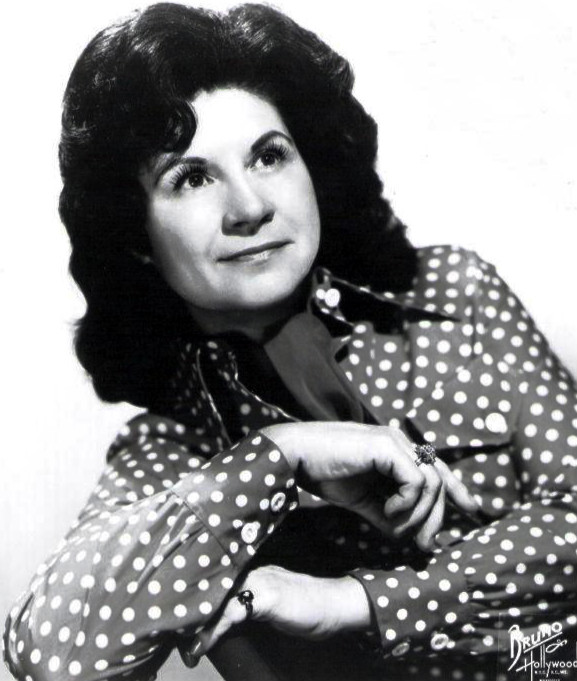
- Wells in a 1974 publicity photo
- Born: Ellen Muriel Deason; August 30, 1919; Nashville, Tennessee, U.S.
- Died: July 16, 2012 (aged 92); Madison, Tennessee, U.S.
- Spouse: Johnnie Wright (m. 1937; died 2011)
- Children: 3, including Ruby and Bobby
- Musical career
- Genres: Country; honky tonk; Nashville sound; gospel
- Occupation: Singer-songwriter
- Instruments: Vocals; guitar
- Years active: 1936–2000
- Labels: RCA Victor; Decca; MCA; Capricorn; Rubocca; Southern Tracks
- Website: Official website

Ellen Muriel Deason (August 30, 1919 – July 16, 2012), known professionally as Kitty Wells, was an American pioneering country music singer. Her 1952 hit recording "It Wasn't God Who Made Honky Tonk Angels" made her the first female country singer to top the U.S. country charts. “It Wasn’t God Who Made Honky Tonk Angels” also was her first of several pop crossover hits. Wells is the only artist to be awarded top female vocalist awards for 14 consecutive years. Her chart-topping hits continued until the mid-1960s, paving the way for and inspiring a long list of female country singers who came to prominence in the 1960s.

Wells ranks as the sixth-most successful female vocalist in the history of the Billboard country charts, according to historian Joel Whitburn's book The Top 40 Country Hits. In 1976, she was inducted into the Country Music Hall of Fame. In 1991, Wells became the third country music artist, after Roy Acuff and Hank Williams, and the eighth woman, to receive the Grammy Lifetime Achievement Award. Wells' success and influence on country music garnered her the title "Queen of Country Music".

== Biography ==
=== Early life ===
Wells was born Ellen Muriel Deason on August 30, 1919, as one of six children of Charles Cary Deason and his wife, Myrtle, in Nashville, Tennessee. (She is one of the few well-known country performers to have been born in Nashville.) Wells began singing as a child, learning guitar from her father, who was a brakeman on the Tennessee Central Railroad. Her father and his brother were musicians, and her mother, Myrtle, was a gospel singer. As a teenager, Wells sang with her sisters, who performed under the name the Deason Sisters, on a local radio station beginning in 1936.

At the age of 18, Wells married Johnnie Wright, a cabinetmaker who aspired to country music stardom (which he would eventually achieve as half of the duo Johnnie & Jack).

=== Music career ===
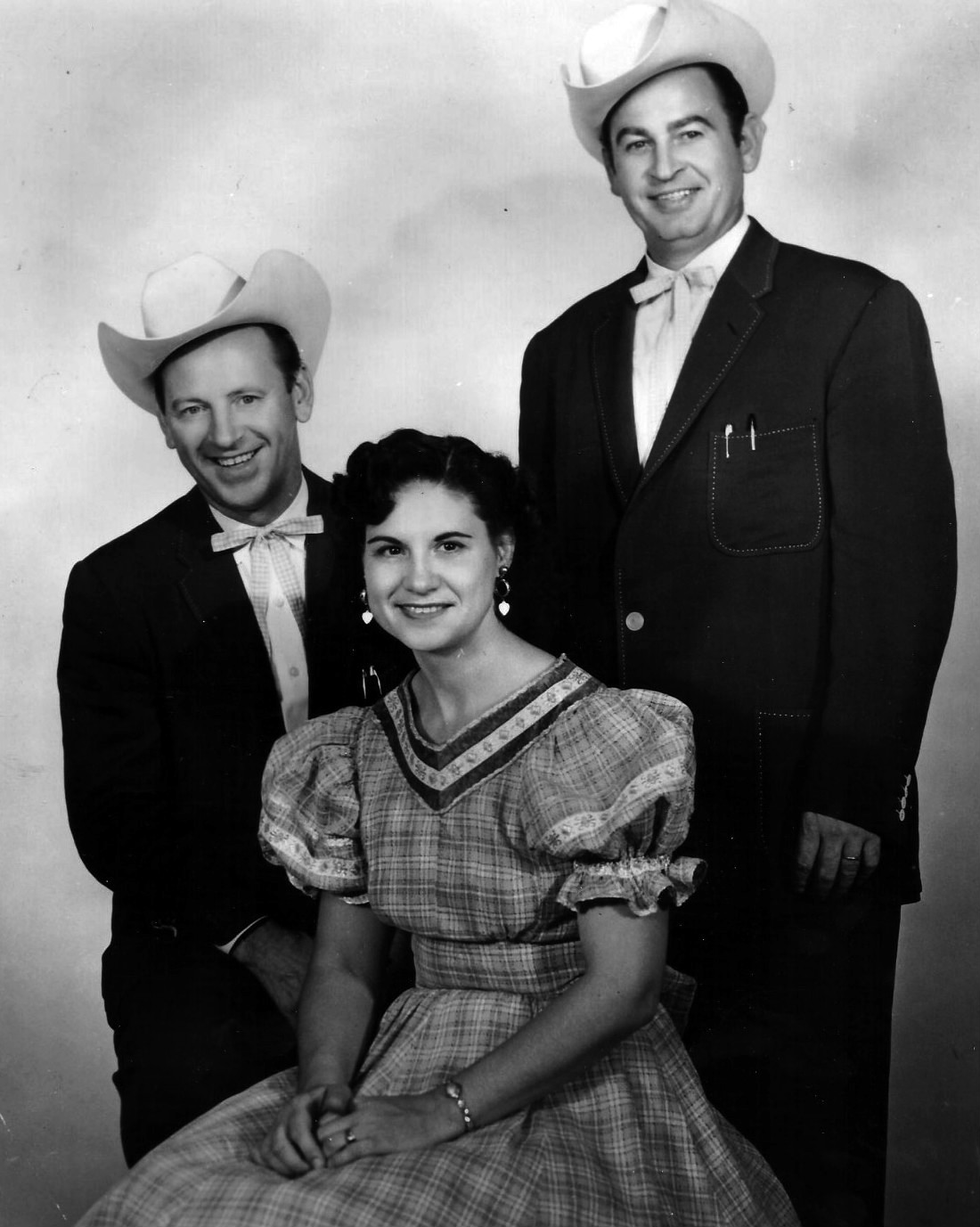
Johnnie Wright (left) and Jack Anglin (right) with Kitty Wells (center)

Wells sang with Wright and his sister Louise Wright; the three toured as Johnnie Right and the Harmony Girls. Soon, Wright met Jack Anglin (who married Johnnie's sister Louise), and they became the duo Johnnie & Jack. Their band became known first as the Tennessee Hillbillies and then the Tennessee Mountain Boys. At this time, Wells adopted "Kitty Wells" as her stage name. Johnnie Wright chose the name from the folk ballad "Sweet Kitty Wells" by the Pickard Family. Wells toured with the pair, occasionally performing backup vocals. Before Wells' rise to stardom with "Honky Tonk Angels", Roy Acuff and the Smoky Mountain Boys toured with Wright and Wells for a time. Acuff advised Wright not to make his wife his show's headliner because he thought women could not sell country music records.

On Louisiana Hayride, Wells performed with her husband's duo. Wells, however, did not sing on their records until signing with RCA Victor in 1949, releasing some of her first singles, including "Death at the Bar" and "Don't Wait for the Last Minute to Pray", neither of which charted. While these early records gained some notice, promoters still were not keen on promoting female singers, so Wells was dropped from the label in 1950.

==== 1952: "It Wasn't God Who Made Honky Tonk Angels" ====
In 1952, Paul Cohen, an executive at Decca Records, approached Wells to record "It Wasn't God Who Made Honky Tonk Angels". Wells was disenchanted with her career prospects and was considering retirement, but agreed to the session (at Owen Bradley's studio on May 3, 1952) because of the $125 union scale recording payment. "I wasn't expecting to make a hit," said Wells later. "I just thought it was another song." "It Wasn't God Who Made Honky Tonk Angels" was an answer song to Hank Thompson's "The Wild Side of Life" and its lyrical treatment of seductive, wayward women. Wells' single retorted, "It's a shame that all the blame is on us women."

The record's message was controversial at the time and was banned by many radio stations. NBC, in particular, was troubled by the lyric, "It brings back memories of when I was a trustful wife". Wells' slight alteration of "trustful" to "trusting" lifted the network ban on the song. It was temporarily banned from the Grand Ole Opry. Nevertheless, audiences were greatly enamored of the song. The single took off during the summer of 1952, and sold more than 800,000 copies in its initial release. It was the first single by a female singer to peak at number one in the eight-year history of the Billboard Country Chart, where it remained for six weeks. (Certain female country songs, notably Patsy Montana's million-selling "I Want to Be a Cowboy's Sweetheart", antedate the creation of Billboard's country chart in 1944.) "It Wasn't God Who Made Honky Tonk Angels" also crossed over to Billboard's pop charts, hitting number 27. Thanks to her breakthrough, Wells received a membership to the Grand Ole Opry, which had originally banned the single.

Writer Bill Friskics-Warren has argued that part of the song's appeal came from its combination of a modern message with a familiar tune, a melody drawn from the Carter Family's "I'm Thinking Tonight of My Blue Eyes" (as were "The Wild Side of Life" and Roy Acuff's "The Great Speckled Bird"). Practically anyone could hum along with "Angels" the first time they heard it.

==== 1953–1969: Career peak ====
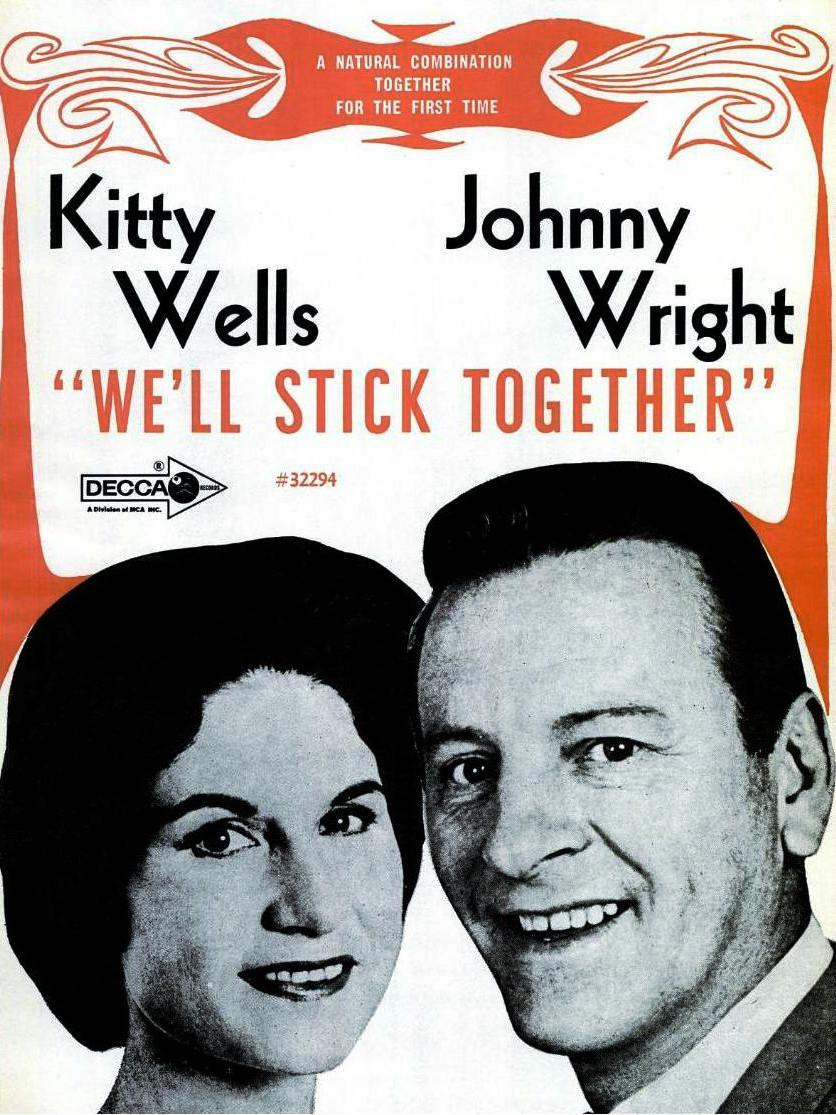
Advertisement featuring Kitty Wells and husband Johnnie Wright's first joint album, We'll Stick Together

"It Wasn't God Who Made Honky Tonk Angels" was followed by "Paying for that Back Street Affair", a response to Webb Pierce's "Back Street Affair". The single reached number six in the spring of 1953, helping to establish a lasting place at the top of the charts for Wells. Between 1953 and 1955, Wells was popular on the country charts, and was the only female solo artist at the time to be able to maintain her success. In 1953, Wells had two top-10 hits with "Hey Joe" and "Cheatin's a Sin".

The next year, Wells partnered with country star Red Foley for the duet "One by One", which peaked at number one on the Billboard Country Chart, and became her second chart-topper. The song led to a string of hit singles from the duo within the next two decades, including 1954's "As Long as I Live", which peaked at number three. As a solo artist in 1954, Wells had two major hits with the number-eight "Release Me" and the top-15 hit "Thou Shalt Not Steal" (written by Don Everly of the Everly Brothers).

Record companies were reluctant to issue albums by country's female artists until Wells proved that women could sell. She became the first female country singer to issue an LP, starting with 1956's Kitty Wells' Country Hit Parade, which consisted of her biggest hits. Wells released her first studio album in 1957 with Winner of Your Heart. Soon, other female country singers released LPs in the late 1950s and early 1960s. "Making Believe" and "Lonely Side of Town" were also released as singles. Wells' later 1950s releases included "Searching (For Someone Like You)" written by Murphy "Pee Wee" Maddux, and "I Can't Stop Loving You" and "Amigo's Guitar", which she wrote with John D. Loudermilk.

In 1957, Wells issued Winner of Your Heart. This was followed by a string of LPs released by Decca Records between 1957 and 1973. She also partnered with Webb Pierce the same year for two duet singles, including the top-10 hit "Oh So Many Years". The duo did not record together again until 1964 with the top-10 hit "Finally". In 1959, Wells had two top-five hits with "Amigo's Guitar" and "Mommy for a Day". Wells was later awarded a BMI award for writing "Amigo's Guitar". Although not known much for her songwriting, Wells has won two BMI awards, including one for "Amigo's Guitar". She has published more than 60 songs.

Wells continued to put much of herself into her songs throughout her career, inspiring other female country singers to record risky material, as well. Loretta Lynn was one of her followers in this sense when she recorded "Don't Come Home a Drinkin' (With Lovin' on Your Mind)" in 1967. Dolly Parton's 1968 recording "Just Because I'm a Woman", like "Honky Tonk Angels", questioned the male-female double standard.

Wells entered the 1960s on top with the songs "Heartbreak U.S.A." and "Day into Night". "Heartbreak USA" peaked at number one on the Billboard Country Chart and became her third and final number-one hit. The follow-up, "Day Into Night", was a top-10 hit the same year. Owen Bradley continued as Wells' producer in the 1960s. Bradley produced some of the biggest-selling country crossover singers of the time. The well-known Nashville Sound vocal group the Jordanaires can be heard backing Wells on her big country hit from 1961 "Heartbreak U.S.A.".

In the early '60s, Wells continued to have top-10 hits frequently. In 1962, Wells had three top-10 hits with "Will Your Lawyer Talk to God", "Unloved Wanted", and "We Missed You". Beginning in 1964, Wells' albums began to chart the Top Country Albums chart, starting with the LP Especially for You. Some of Wells' albums peaked within the top 10 on that chart. That same year, Wells' singles began to return to the top 10 with "This White Circle on My Finger" and "Password", both of which peaked at number seven on the Billboard Country Chart. In 1965, Wells had her last top-10 hit with "Meanwhile, Down at Joe's", and in 1966, Wells then had her final top-20 hit with "It's All Over but the Crying", which peaked at number 14 on the country charts.

During the late 1960s and 1970s, Wells managed to have a string of minor hits and remained a popular concert attraction. She continued with a string of top-40 hits nearly until the end of the decade with her last top-40 single, "My Big Truck Drivin' Man", in 1968. In 1968, Wells recorded a duet album with husband Johnnie Wright called We'll Stick Together. Wells also reunited with Red Foley at the end of the decade for a studio album. Her albums continued to reach the Top Country Albums chart until 1969 with Guilty Street.

Wells became the first female country star to have her own syndicated television show, with her husband in 1969, The Kitty Wells/Johnnie Wright Family Show, which also featured appearances by their children, including actor Bobby Wright. The program could not compete, though, against shows starring more contemporary male artists such as Porter Wagoner and Bill Anderson, and only ran for one year.

==== 1970–2012: Later career and retirement ====
Wells stayed under the Decca label until 1973. She released three studio albums in 1970 and two in 1971. In 1973, when Decca became MCA Records, Wells stayed with them for a short time before leaving the label. In 1974, she signed with Capricorn Records, a southern rock label of the era, and recorded a blues-flavored album entitled Forever Young on which she was backed by members of the Allman Brothers Band and the Marshall Tucker Band. The album received considerable acclaim, and through its association with the Allmans, brought Wells to the attention of a younger audience.

In 1976, Wells was inducted into the Country Music Hall of Fame. In the late 1970s, Wells and husband formed their own record label, Rubocca (the name was a composite of their three children's names: Ruby, Bobby, and Carol Sue) and released several albums. In 1979, at age 60, she was back on the Billboard charts with "I Thank You for the Roses".

Wells remained a successful concert attraction at smaller venues throughout the country and Canada as late as the early 2000s. In 1987, she joined fellow Opry legends Brenda Lee and Loretta Lynn on k.d. lang's "Honky Tonk Angels Medley", which was nominated for a Grammy award in 1989. Wells' 1955 recording "Making Believe" was included in the soundtrack of the film Mississippi Burning.

In 1991, Wells was awarded from the Grammy Awards a Lifetime Achievement Award. She, along with Johnnie and Bobby, joined producers Randall Franks and Alan Autry for the In the Heat of the Night CD "Christmas Time's a Comin'" performing "Jingle Bells" with the cast on the CD released on Sonlite and MGM/UA for one of the most popular Christmas releases of 1991 and 1992 with Southern retailers. In 1993, Wells appeared on Dolly Parton, Loretta Lynn and Tammy Wynette's collaboration Honky Tonk Angels, joining in on their recording of the title track.

Wells and her husband opened the Family Country Junction Museum and Studio in 1983 in their hometown of Madison, but stopped running it on their own in 2000. Their grandson John Sturdivant Jr. has kept the Junction Recording Studio at its present location, which also houses Junction Records. Wells and her singing-partner husband of 63 years performed their final show together on December 31, 2000, at the Nashville Nightlife Theater; they had announced their retirement earlier that year. Wells was ranked number 15 on CMT's 40 Greatest Women of Country Music in 2002.

An exhibit honoring Wells at the Country Music Hall of Fame and Museum in Nashville ran from August 2008 through June 2009. On May 14, 2008, "It Wasn't God Who Made Honky Tonk Angels" was added to the National Recording Registry at the Library of Congress, along with Roy Orbison's "Oh, Pretty Woman".

=== Personal life ===
Wells married Johnnie Wright in 1937; they had three children, Ruby, Bobby, and Carol Sue, eight grandchildren, 12 great-grandchildren, and seven great-great-grandchildren. Carol Sue released a single with Wells in the mid '50s, titled "How Far Is Heaven", which peaked at No. 11 on the Billboard Country Chart. While two of Wells' children pursued music careers, Carol Sue did not, but she was married to Nashville Music Row executive John Sturdivant Sr. and recorded numerous songs with her family, including performing with Ruby as the Wright Sisters. Ruby recorded an album for the Kapp label and was a member of 'Nita, Rita, and Ruby. Bobby recorded albums for both Decca and ABC. Wells and her husband were lifelong members of the Church of Christ. The couple celebrated their 70th wedding anniversary in 2007 by visiting the small courthouse where they were married in Franklin, Kentucky. Kitty and Johnnie were married 74 years at Johnnie's death in 2011.

=== Death ===
Kitty Wells died on July 16, 2012, in Madison, Tennessee, from complications of a stroke. She was 92. She is interred at Spring Hill Cemetery in Nashville, Tennessee.

== Achievements and honors ==
- First solo female country artist to have a number-one record on the charts
- First female country artist to sell one million records
- First woman to headline a major tour
- First woman to headline a syndicated television variety show
- Voted top country female artist for 14 consecutive years
- Holds record for single at number two on the charts with "Makin' Believe" for 15 weeks
- Country Music Hall of Fame inductee (1976)
- NARAS Governor's Award for Outstanding Achievement in the Recording Industry (1981)
- Academy of Country Music's Pioneer Award (1985)
- NARAS Grammy Lifetime Achievement Award (1991)
- The Music City News Living Legend Award (1993)
- Native American Music Hall of Fame Inductee (2002)
- National Recording Registry at the Library of Congress for "It Wasn't God Who Made Honky Tonk Angels" (2008)
- In 2019, Kitty Wells was honored in Brazil by the channel canal Pouco Recurso News. The grandson of the singer John Sturdivant Jr participated in the tribute to his grandmother, with a video of thanks.
- Mentioned fondly in the Gordon Lightfoot song “I Used to Be a Country Singer” (1998)
- Volunteer State Music Hall of Fame inductee (2025)

== Discography ==
=== Top Ten Singles ===
Year	Single	Chart positions	
Year	Single	US Country	US
1952	"It Wasn't God Who Made Honky Tonk Angels"	1	
1953	"Paying For That Back Street Affair"	6	
1953	"Hey Joe"	8	
1953	"Cheatin's a Sin"	9	
1954	"Release Me"	8	
1955	"Making Believe"	2	
1955	"Whose Shoulder Will You Cry On"	7	
1955	"There's Poison in Your Heart"	9	
1955	"The Lonely Side of Town"	7	
1955	"I've Kissed You My Last Time"	7	
1956	"Searching (For Someone Like You)"	3	
1956	"Repenting"	6	
1957	"Three Ways (To Love You)"	3	
1957	"(I'll Always Be Your) Fraulein"	10	
1958	"I Can't Stop Loving You"	3	
1958	"Jealousy"	7	78
1959	"Mommy For a Day"	5	
1959	"Amigo's Guitar"	5	
1960	"Left to Right"	5	
1961	"Heartbreak U.S.A."	1	
1961	"Day Into Night"	10	
1962	"Unloved, Unwanted"	5	
1962	"Will Your Lawyer Talk To God"	8	
1962	"We Missed You"	7	
1964	"This White Circle on My Finger"	7	
1964	"Password"	4	
1964	"I'll Repossess My Heart"	8	
1965	"You Don't Hear"	4	
1965	"Meanwhile, Down at Joe's"	9	
