= Kitty Wells albums discography =

Kitty Wells discography
- Studio albums: 36
- Compilation albums: 11
- Box sets: 1

The albums discography of Kitty Wells, an American country artist, consists of thirty-six studio albums, eleven compilation albums, and one box set. Wells' first album release was 1956's Country Hit Parade on Decca Records, which compiled her hits during her first four years of recording for the label. Prior to its release, many labels were reluctant to release albums by female country artists until Wells became the first female vocalist to sell records. Following its release, Wells and her label issued three studio albums during the 1950s: Winner of Your Heart (1957), Lonely Street (1958), and Dust on the Bible (1959). After the success of Wells' number one single "Heartbreak U.S.A." in 1961, an album of the same name was released the same year.

In 1963, her fourth compilation album, The Kitty Wells Story, became her first album to chart among the newly created Billboard Magazine Top Country Albums list, peaking at #7. In 1964, her tenth studio album, Especially for You, became her first studio album to chart on the same list, peaking at #19. The latter started a string of albums that would peak on the Billboard country chart during the 1960s, including Burning Memories (#7; 1965), Lonesome, Sad, and Blue (#7; 1965), and Queen of Honky Tonk Street (#5; 1967).

After collaborating with country artist Red Foley on a single, the pair released the album Together Again in 1967. The album reached #24 on the Billboard Country Albums chart. The following year, Wells and her husband Johnnie Wright issued We'll Stick Together, whose title track became a minor hit. The duo also released a gospel album in 1972. In the 1970s, Wells' chart success declined and her albums remained absent from the Billboard lists. Before leaving Decca/MCA, Wells released Yours Truly, her final studio album for the label, in 1973. Wells signed with Capricorn Records in 1975 and released her thirtieth studio album, Forever Young, the same year. In 1979, Wells and her husband formed the label Rubocca Records, and Wells issued her final studio albums in 1979 and 1981 on Rubocca respectively. Hopefully one day all of Kitty Wells later Decca/Mca recordings from the 1960’s and 1970’s will be on CD discography on compact disc as of 2024 is selective.

== Studio albums ==
=== 1950s ===
Title	Album details
Winner of Your Heart	Release date: June 1956; Label: Decca; Formats: LP
Lonely Street	Release date: August 1958; Label: Decca; Formats: LP
After Dark	Release date: June 1959; Label: Decca; Formats: LP
Dust on the Bible	Release date: August 1959; Label: Decca; Formats: LP

=== 1960s ===
Title	Album details	Peak positions
Title	Album details	US Country
Kitty's Choice	Release date: April 1960; Label: Decca; Formats: LP	—
Seasons of My Heart	Release date: September 1960; Label: Decca; Formats: LP	—
Heartbreak U.S.A.	Release date: May 1961; Label: Decca; Formats: LP	—
Queen of Country Music	Release date: February 1962; Label: Decca; Formats: LP	—
Singing on Sunday	Release date: June 1962; Label: Decca; Formats: LP	—
Christmas Day With Kitty Wells	Release date: November 1962; Label: Decca; Formats: LP	—
Especially for You	Release date: January 1964; Label: Decca; Formats: LP	19
Country Music Time	Release date: August 1964; Label: Decca; Formats: LP	14
Burning Memories	Release date: February 1965; Label: Decca; Formats: LP	7
Lonesome, Sad, and Blue	Release date: June 1965; Label: Decca; Formats: LP	7
Songs Made Famous by Jim Reeves	Release date: February 1966; Label: Decca; Formats: LP	24
Country All the Way	Release date: June 1966; Label: Decca; Formats: LP	9
The Kitty Wells Show	Release date: December 1966; Label: Decca; Formats: LP	—
Love Makes the World Go Around	Release date: April 1967; Label: Decca; Formats: LP	28
Queen of Honky Tonk Street	Release date: October 1967; Label: Decca; Formats: LP, reel tape	5
Showcase	Release date: March 1968; Label: Decca; Formats: LP, 8 track, cassette tape, reel	22
Cream of Country Hits	Release date: December 1968; Label: Decca; Formats: LP, 8 track, cassette, reel	—
Guilty Street	Release date: 1969; Label: Decca; Formats: LP, 8 track, cassette, reel	29
"—" denotes releases that did not chart.

=== 1970s–1980s ===
Title	Album details
A Bouquet of Country Hits	Release date: January 1970; Label: Decca; Formats: LP, 8 track, cassette
Singin' Em Country	Release date: July 1970; Label: Decca; Formats: LP, 8 track, cassette
Your Love Is the Way	Release date: November 1970; Label: Decca; Formats: LP, 8 track, cassette
They're Stepping All Over My Heart	Release date: April 1971; Label: Decca; Formats: LP, 8 track, cassette
Pledging My Love	Release date: October 1971; Label: Decca; Formats: LP, 8 track, cassette
Sincerely	Release date: June 1972; Label: Decca; Formats: LP, 8 track, cassette
I've Got Yesterday	Release date: October 1972; Label: Decca; Formats: LP, 8 track, cassette
Yours Truly	Release date: July 1973; Label: MCA; Formats: LP, 8 track, cassette
Forever Young	Release date: January 1975; Label: Capricorn; Formats: LP, 8 track, cassette
Hall of Fame, Vol. I	Release date: 1979; Label: Rubocca; Formats: LP, 8 track, cassette
Hall of Fame, Vol. II	Release date: 1981; Label: Rubocca; Formats: LP

== Collaborative albums ==
Title	Album details	Peak positions
Title	Album details	US Country
The Kitty Wells Family Gospel Sing (with Kitty Wells' family)	Release date: October 1965; Label: Decca; Formats: LP	—
Together Again (with Red Foley)	Release date: August 1967; Label: Decca; Formats: LP	24
We'll Stick Together (with Johnnie Wright)	Release date: July 1968; Label: Decca; Formats: LP	30
Kitty Wells and Johnnie Wright Sing Heartwarming Gospel Songs (with Johnnie Wright)	Release date: July 1968; Label: Decca; Formats: LP	—
"—" denotes releases that did not chart.

== Compilation albums ==
Title	Album details	Peak positions
Title	Album details	US Country
Kitty Wells' Country Hit Parade	Release date: 1956; Label: Decca; Formats: LP	—
Kitty Wells' & Red Foley's Golden Favorites	Release date: February 1961; Label: Decca; Formats: LP	—
Kitty Wells' and Red Foley's Golden Hits (with Red Foley)	Release date: 1961; Label: Decca; Formats: LP, 8 track, cassette	—
The Kitty Wells Story	Release date: August 1963; Label: Decca; Formats: LP, 8 track, cassette	7
Kitty Wells	Release date: November 1966; Label: Vocalion; Formats: LP, cassette (1980's reissue on Coral Records)	—
Kitty Wells' Greatest Hits	Release date: June 1968; Label: Decca; Formats: LP, 8 track, cassette, reel	37
Country Heart	Release date: July 1969; Label: Vocalion; Formats: LP	—
Jesus Is Coming Soon	Release date: 1990; Label: MCA Special Products	—
Country Music Hall of Fame Series	Release date: 1991; Label: MCA; Formats: Cassette, CD, music download	—
Queens of Country Music (with Jean Stafford)	Released: 1998; Label: Massive (21682); Format: CD	—
20th Century Masters - The Millennium Collection	Release date: June 4, 2002; Label: MCA Nashville; Formats: Cassette, CD, music download	—
"—" denotes releases that did not chart.

== Box sets ==
Title	Album details
The Queen of Country Music	Release date: June 28, 1994; Label: Bear Family; Formats: CD
