= Discovery Train =

Former Canadian museum on wheels

- Established: 22 July 1978
- Dissolved: 7 July 1980
- Location: Canada
- Type: Mobile museum
- Owner: National Museums of Canada

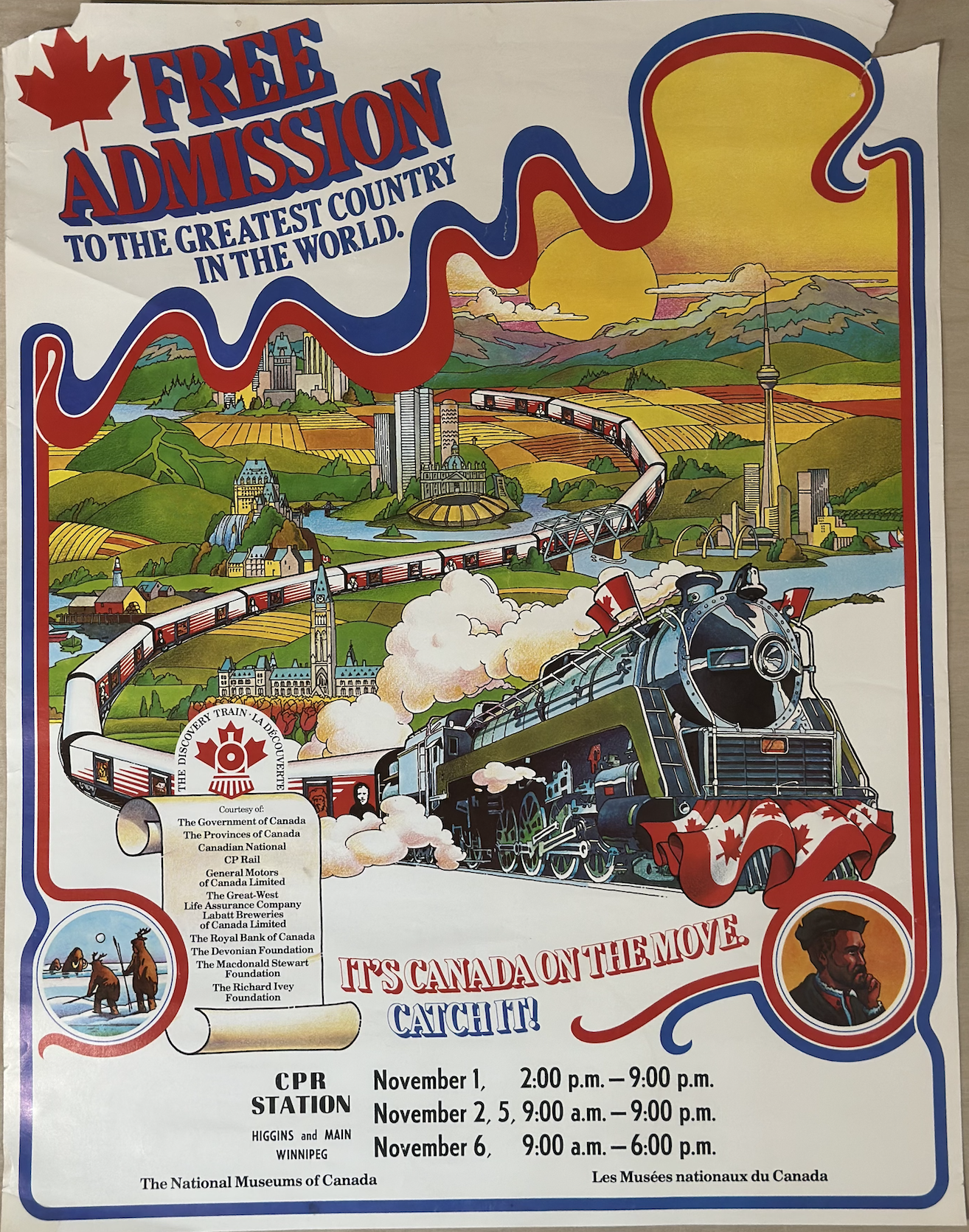
Discovery Train Poster, Winnipeg

Discovery Train (French: La Découverte) was a mobile museum train operated by National Museums of Canada. It toured the country of Canada for two years (1978–1980) with the purpose to help the Canadian people learn about their history.

The ~20 car red and white train toured the width and breadth of Canada. Fifteen of the cars had been used for the similar American Freedom Train in the United States from 1975 to 1976, before being bought by National Museums of Canada. The showcase cars from the Freedom Train were converted to tunnel cars.

To make such a train a reality took the cooperation of many organizations. The Canadian National and Canadian Pacific railroads handled the train free of charge. The Royal Bank of Canada, Labatt Breweries, General Motors of Canada, and the Great-West Life Assurance Company each donated C$400,000. Gifts totalling C$684,500 also came from The Devonian Group, The Richard Ivey Foundation, and the MacDonald Stewart Foundation. There was also a C$100,000 anonymous gift.

Richard Williams Studios made an advert film for the train.

Hundreds of thousands of Canadians rediscovered their country as they toured the train on its three-year journey
