= Freedom Train =

Traveling exhibits that toured the United States

Two national Freedom Trains have toured the United States: the 1947–1949 special exhibit Freedom Train and the 1975–76 American Freedom Train, which celebrated the United States Bicentennial. Each train had its own special red, white, and blue paint scheme and its own itinerary and route across the 48 contiguous states, stopping to visit and displaying Americana and related historical artifacts. The Freedom Train was initially planned to return in 2026 to commemorate the United States Semiquincentennial, but was canceled due to a lack of funding.

The 1940s Freedom Train exhibit was integrated—black and white viewers were allowed to mingle freely. When town officials in Birmingham, Alabama, and Memphis, Tennessee, refused to allow blacks and whites to see the exhibits at the same time, the Freedom Train skipped the planned visits. Public critique followed the train as integration remained an issue in other stops.

== 1947–1949 Freedom Train ==
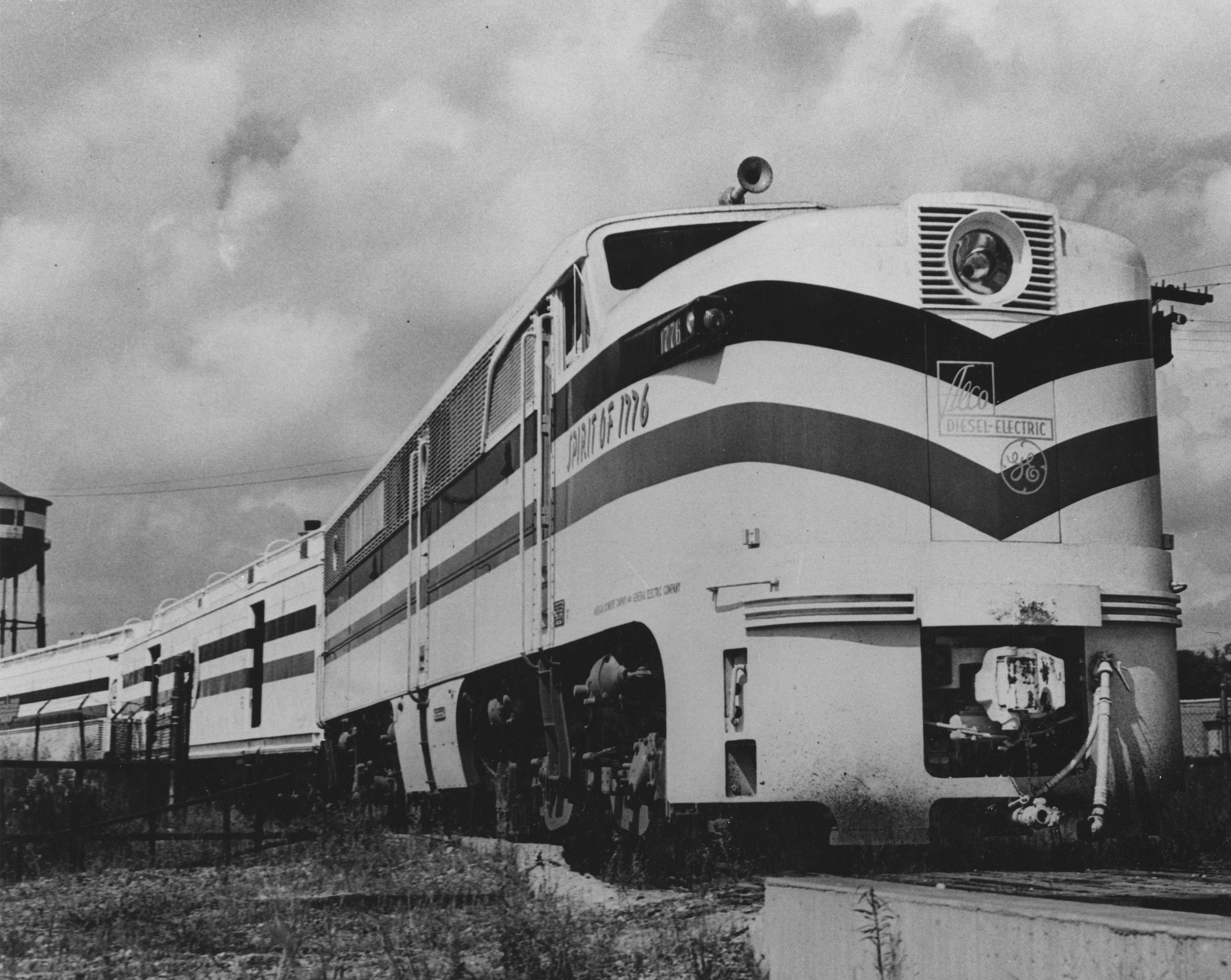
The Freedom Train being idle at a station on November 23, 1950 after its tour

The first Freedom Train was proposed in April 1946 by Attorney General Tom C. Clark, who believed that Americans had begun taking the principles of liberty for granted in the post-war years. The idea was adopted by a coalition that included Paramount Pictures and the Advertising Council, which had just changed its name from "War Advertising Council".

=== Plans and messaging ===
Thomas D'Arcy Brophy (of the advertising firm Kenyon & Eckhardt) described the Freedom Train as "a campaign to sell America to Americans". The Advertising Council planned an assortment of other events to accompany the train, including messages in radio programs, comic books, and films. In each city where the train stopped, they organized a "Rededication Week" for public celebrations of the United States. In February 1947, the group formed the "American Heritage Foundation" and named Brophy its president.

The Board of Trustees for the new foundation included:

- Winthrop W. Aldrich (chairman), president of Chase National Bank and brother-in-law of J. D. Rockefeller Jr.
- Chester Barnard, chairman of the Rockefeller Foundation
- John Foster Dulles, then a lawyer and Republican political advisor, soon to become the U.S. Secretary of State
- Paul G. Hoffman, CEO of Studebaker automobile company, administrator of the Marshall Plan, and soon-to-be President of the Ford Foundation
- Eric Johnston, former President of the U.S. Chamber of Commerce and president of the Motion Picture Association of America
- Reinhold Niebuhr, prominent theologian
- Charles E. Wilson, CEO of the General Electric Company and soon to be chief of the Office of Defense Mobilization—sometimes described as "co-president" of the United States under Truman

The Board of Trustees did not include any African-Americans until after the train had launched. Walter White, Lester Granger, and A. Philip Randolph were proposed and rejected as candidates for membership. Frederick D. Patterson, president of Tuskegee Institute and founder of the United Negro College Fund was named as a trustee in October 1947.

American Federation of Labor president William Green and Congress of Industrial Organizations president Philip Murray were vice presidents of the Foundation.

The National Archives supplied the train with key documents, while, as archivist Elizabeth Hamer noted in August 1947, "Hollywood, chiefly, is putting up the capital for this exhibit." The Foundation rejected the list of documents proposed by the National Archives, which included documents such as Executive Order 8802. Contrary to the Justice Department's wishes, the Foundation excluded collective bargaining from the list of citizens' rights. In the final roster, the only document about black history was the Emancipation Proclamation—and even in this case, accompanying commentary focused on the white president Abraham Lincoln who issued the document. The Freedom Train also displayed a letter from Christopher Columbus, the Mayflower Compact, and documents of German and Japanese surrender from World War II.

While preparing for the tour, the planners decided to downplay comparisons of the United States with the Nazis, as well as direct calls for foreign intervention. Instead, they sought to craft a shared ideology for Americans. Clark wrote, "Indoctrination in democracy is the essential catalytic agent needed to blend our various groups into one American family. Without it, we could not sustain the continuity of our way of life. In its largest sense, preaching Americanism is an affirmative declaration of our faith in ourselves".

The Freedom Train displayed exhibits such as "Good Citizen", which portrayed men wearing suits. Exhibits also defined American freedoms in terms of consumerism and boasted of superior commodity production. For women (more often referred to as "girls" or "sisters"), good citizenship was defined in terms of clothing, participation in certain acceptable community activities, and raising children.

=== Execution ===
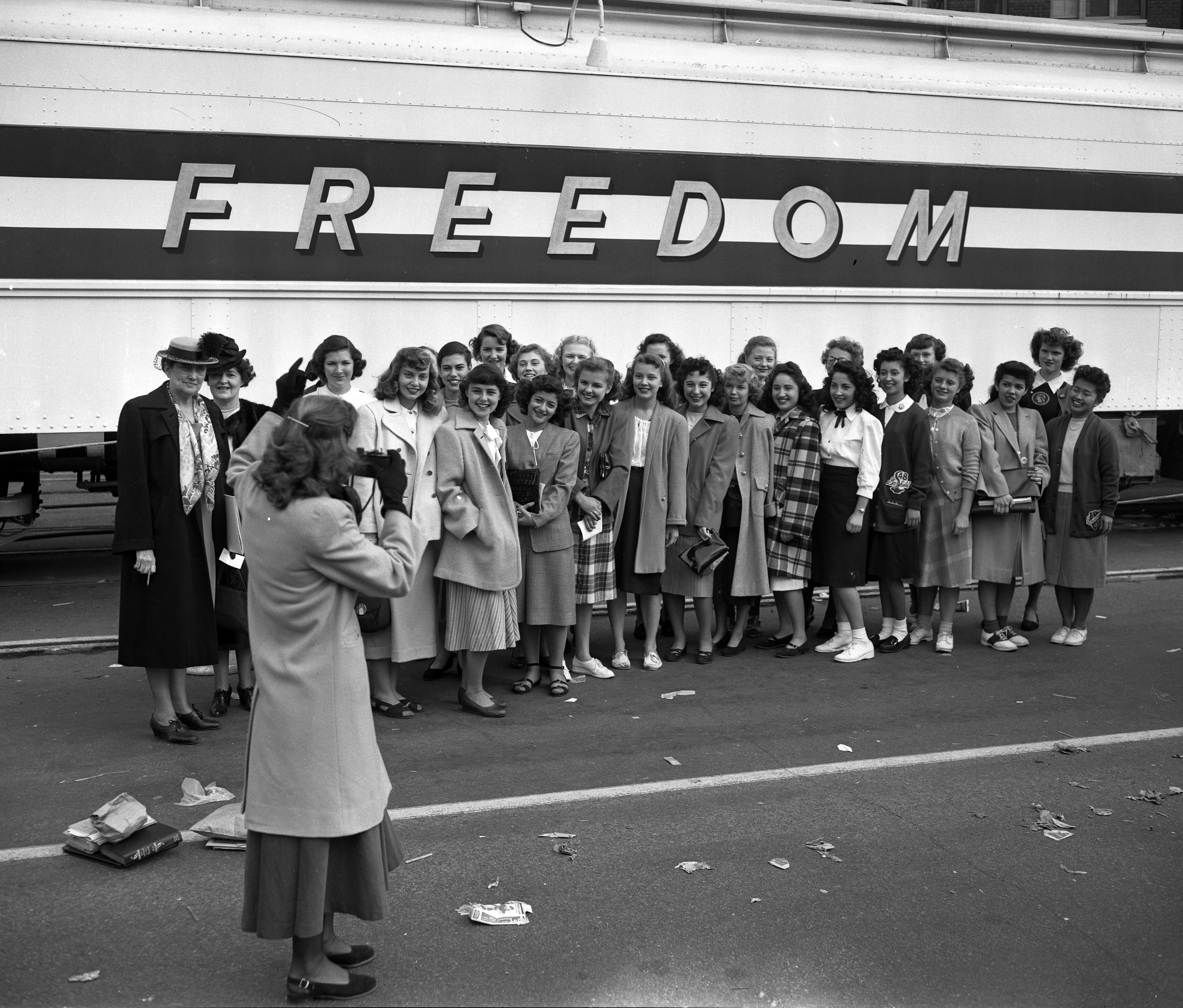
The Susan B. Anthony Club of Los Angeles gathers for a photograph in front of the Freedom Train in February 1948.

An ALCO PA diesel-electric locomotive pulled the seven-car train, which carried the original versions of the United States Constitution, the Declaration of Independence, the Truman Doctrine, and the Bill of Rights on its tour of more than 300 cities in all 48 states. As Alaska and Hawaii did not gain statehood until 1959, this train toured all of the U.S. states that existed at the time. It was the first train to visit all 48 contiguous states (the Rexall Train in 1936 had come close, but missed Nevada).

Top Marines were selected to attend the training and the famous documents. Col. Robert F. Scott led the Marine contingent. According to attendees, Mark and Mary Ellen Murphy:

"With polite and firm prodding, the Marines hurried through as many as 1200 persons an hour, giving each an average of three seconds to look at each exhibit. As they shuffled through the beige-and-green cars, they listened to regional and patriotic music played over a public address system and to a 'move faster' exhortation by a suave Marine voice which came through the speaker every time a record changed."

The Freedom Train even had an official song, written by Irving Berlin and performed by Bing Crosby and the Andrews Sisters.

The train's first public display stop occurred in Philadelphia, Pennsylvania, on September 17, 1947. From there, the train traveled in a route that took it up to New England, down the Atlantic coast to Florida, across the nation's southern states to California, up the Pacific coast to Washington, then across the northern states to Minnesota. After touring the perimeter of the nation, the train moved inland from Minnesota to Colorado, then Kansas and Missouri, north to Wisconsin, then south to the Ohio River valley, north again to Michigan, and finally east to New Jersey. The train's official tour ended on January 22, 1949, in Washington, D.C., nearly three months after its last public display on October 26, 1948, in Havre de Grace, Maryland. A notable stop on the train's itinerary was its appearance at the Chicago Railroad Fair from July 5–9 that year.

The American Heritage Foundation gave licenses to some vendors to sell Freedom Train gear, such as books and postcards, while barring unauthorized merchants from selling other Freedom paraphernalia.

The white press favored the train with mostly positive coverage. One exception was John O'Donnell, who commented in the Washington Times-Herald: "... we understand a committee headed by Winthrop Alrich, son-in-law of John D. Rockefeller Jr., is launching the campaign. Their wayward historical bus is scheduled to depart with great huzzahs from the White House ... Hold on to your hats, boys, you're going for another ride, and remember to keep the moths out of that uniform."

In the view of the Advertising Council, the Freedom Train succeeded, especially through the local rallies and media messages which accompanied it. This multifaceted project thus became a model for future efforts in the Cold War.

=== Conflict over segregation ===
The announcement of the Freedom Train plan on May 22, 1947, provoked spirited commentary on the state of blacks’ freedom in America. Black American poet Langston Hughes wrote a critical poem, "Freedom Train", in which he described the train passing through the segregated southern states, where black and white passengers rode in separate cars. The poem was famously recorded by Paul Robeson. Facing a public-relations backlash and seeking to brand the Western Bloc as freer than its counterpart, the Truman administration announced in September 1947 a policy of desegregation for the train, scheduled to depart in only two weeks.

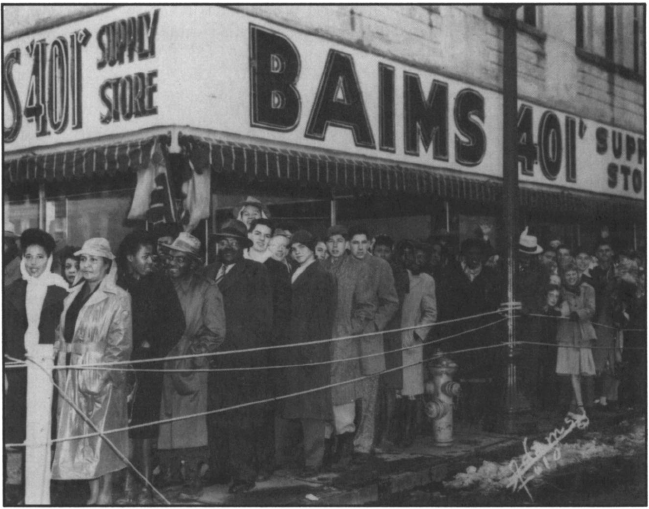
Black and white people waiting together in line to enter the Freedom Train in Pine Bluff, Arkansas on January 21, 1948

Mayor James J. Pleasants Jr., of Memphis, Tennessee, announced that black and white people would be allowed to visit the Freedom Train only during separate visiting hours. (Pleasants acted with the support of their boss Edward H. Crump, the most influential figure in Memphis politics during the first half of the 20th century.) When Freedom Train organizers then canceled the train's planned stop in Memphis, Pleasants responded that segregated viewing hours were necessary to avert "race trouble" that would inevitably result from interracial "jostling and pushing". To Freedom Train stops in other cities, the mayor's office sent undercover agents, who reported that, first, some other southern cities had enforced segregation during viewing, and that white patrons of the Freedom Train elsewhere had disliked the presence of Black Americans.

In Montgomery, Alabama, agitation by Edgar Nixon and Rosa Parks resulted in the appointment of black members to the local Freedom Train planning committee and a promise of desegregation during the train's visit.

In Birmingham, Alabama, protest from public safety commissioner Bull Connor insisted that black and white people would wait for the train in separate lines and take turns entering. The idea behind the "Birmingham Plan" was that whites and blacks would technically be on board the train at the same time, without having to encounter each other directly. Under pressure, Connors and his colleague James E. Morgan stated:

Our segregation law is for the protection of the white and black races in the city, and for the prevention of disorders. . . . It is not a mantle to be set aside at the instance of this or that visitor to the city. If those in charge of the Freedom Train should see fit to bring it to Birmingham, they will be welcomed cordially, but cannot expect that either they or visitors to the Freedom Train will be exempt from our laws.

Under pressure and threat of boycott by various organizations, including the NAACP, the American Heritage Foundation also canceled the Freedom Train's appearance in Birmingham. The episode was somewhat embarrassing for collaborationist local black leaders Ernest Taggart and I. J. Israel, who defended their support of the segregated Freedom Train visit in the spirit of compromise.

Public critique of the train continued during the tour. The Sunday Oregonian published a two-page section titled "No Premium Fares on Freedom Train—But Actually Some Citizens Still Ride Second Class", detailing persistent discrimination and violence against black Americans. These and other rumblings were described by FBI director J. Edgar Hoover as "Negro Communist" agitation.

== 1975–76 American Freedom Train ==
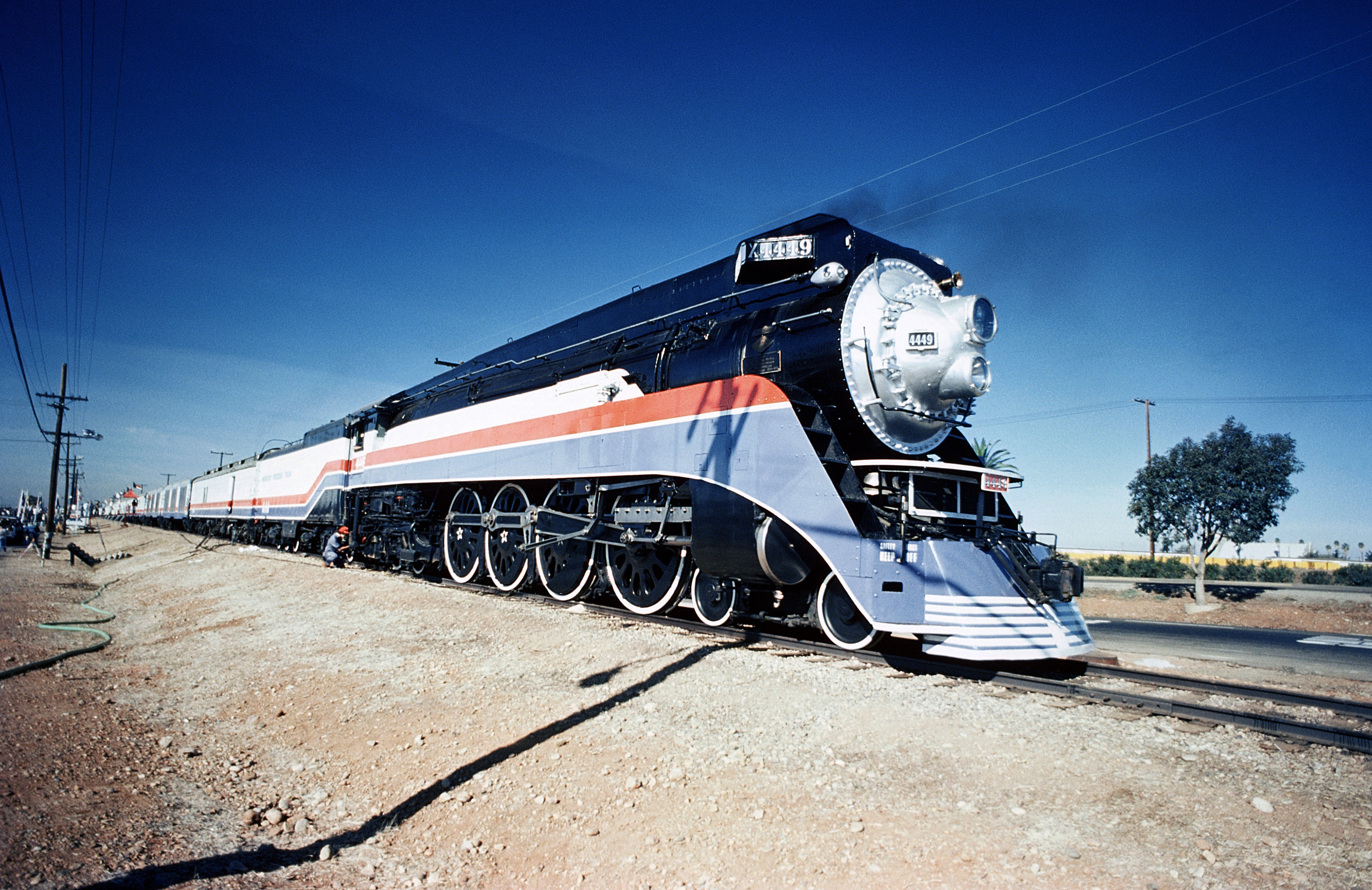
The American Freedom Train waiting at the Naval Air Station in Miramar, California, on January 15, 1976

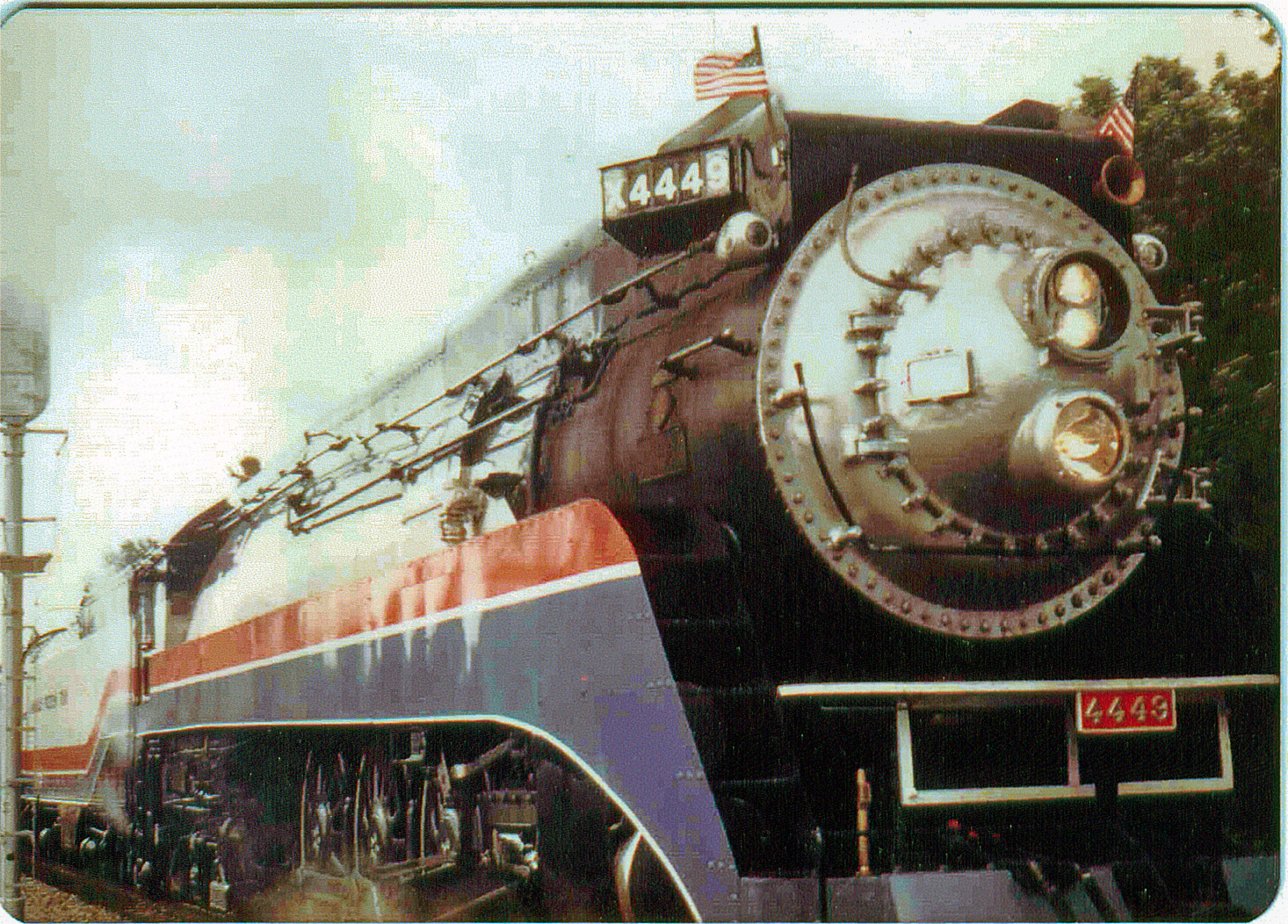
No. 4449 stopping in Georgia in 1976 while pulling the train

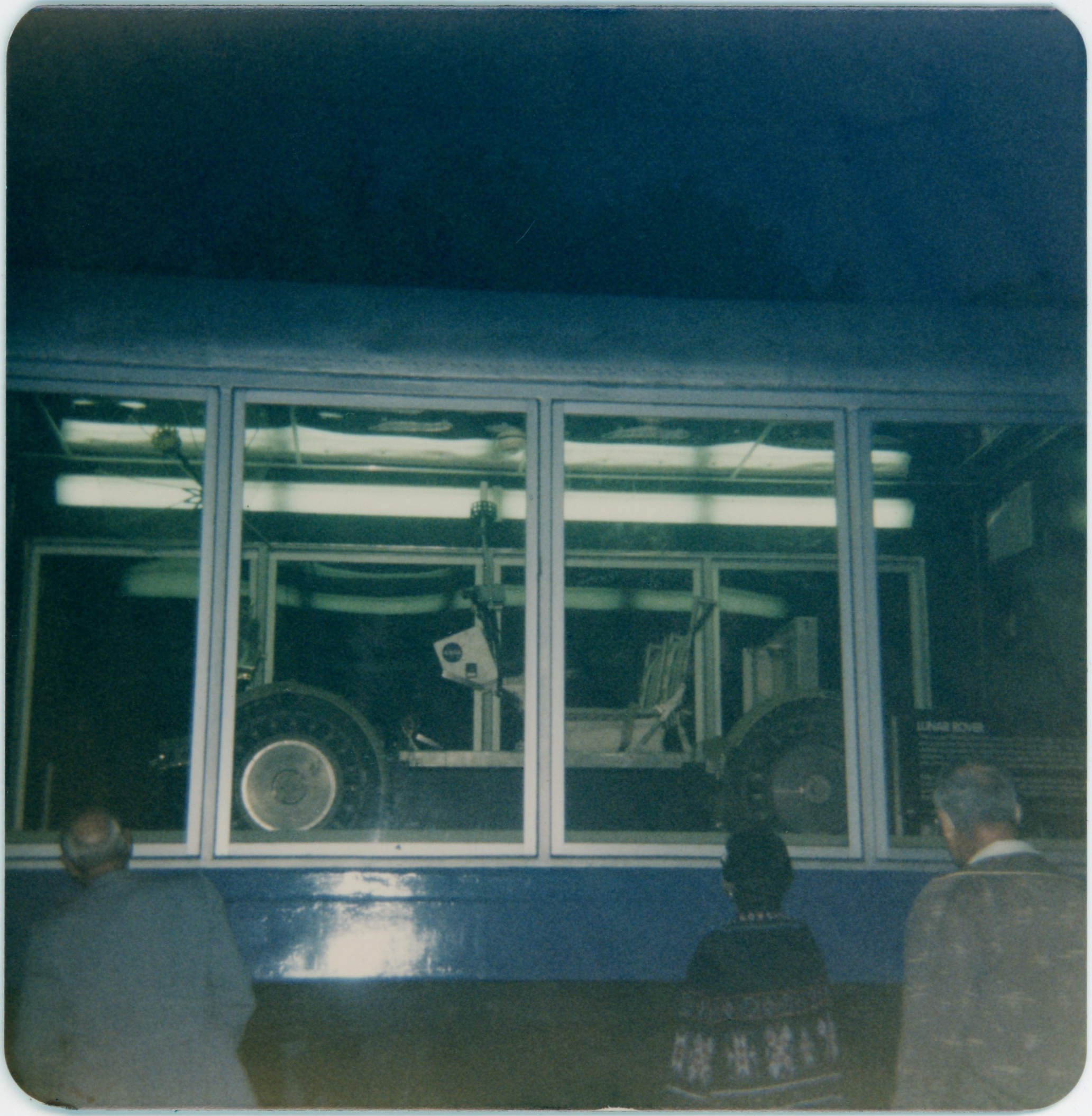
The lunar rover replica inside car #41 at Minnehaha Falls Park, Minnesota, on August 26, 1975

Another national train, the American Freedom Train, toured the country in 1975–76 to commemorate the United States Bicentennial. Three newly restored steam locomotives powered the 26-car train. The first to pull the train was the former Reading Company T-1 class 4-8-4 No. 2101. The second was the former Southern Pacific No. 4449, another 4-8-4 which pulled the train through the Western region. The third was the former Texas & Pacific 2-10-4 No. 610, which pulled the train in Texas. Each locomotive pulled the train throughout a different region of the country. Due to light rail loadings and track conditions on the Louisville and Nashville Railroad, diesels hauled the American Freedom Train from New Orleans to Mobile, Alabama. Diesels were also required in Chicago after the steam locomotive derailed attempting to negotiate tracks by the Chicago lakefront.

The train itself consisted of 10 display cars, converted from New York Central and Penn Central baggage cars. They carried more than 500 treasures of Americana, including George Washington's copy of the Constitution, the original Louisiana Purchase, Judy Garland's dress from The Wizard of Oz, Joe Frazier's boxing trunks, Martin Luther King Jr.'s pulpit and robes, replicas of Jesse Owens' four Olympic gold medals from 1936 (one of which was stolen somewhere along the way), a pair of Wilt Chamberlain's basketball shoes, and a rock from the Moon. The train also consisted of two showcase cars, also converted from NYC and PC baggage cars, Nos. 40 and 41. They had large showcase windows on either side, through which the exhibits could be seen day and night. They carried a model of the Baltimore and Ohio "Arabian" steam locomotive, the Friendship fire engine from Washington's fire company, a 1904 Oldsmobile Runabout, a replica of the Apollo lunar rover, a map of the train's journey, and the Freedom Bell.

The train toured across all 48 contiguous states. More than 7 million Americans visited during its tour, while millions more stood along the tracks to see it go by.

The tour began on April 1, 1975, in Wilmington, Delaware, and headed northeast to New England, west through Pennsylvania, Ohio, to Michigan, then around Lake Michigan to Illinois and Wisconsin. From the Midwest, the tour continued westward, zigzagging across the plains to Utah and then up to the Pacific Northwest. From Seattle, Washington, the tour then traveled south along the Pacific coast to Southern California. The train and its crew spent Christmas in Pomona, California, No. 4449 decorated with a large profile of Santa Claus on the front of the smokebox above the front coupler. For 1976, the tour continued from southern California eastward through Arizona, New Mexico, and Texas, then turned north to visit Kansas and Missouri, then traveled through the Gulf Coast states, and then north again to Pennsylvania. The tour continued southeast to New Jersey, then south along the Atlantic coast before finally ending in Miami, Florida on December 26. The last visitor went through the train on December 31. By the time the tour ended, the American Freedom Train had traveled 25,833 miles (40,858 kilometers) over 21 months and stopped at 138 cities.

In early 1977, the national museums of Canada bought 15 of the cars and used them from 1978 to 1980 on a rail tour across Canada as the Discovery Train, a mobile museum focusing on that country's history.

On January 12, 2026, Reading 2101 itself made its debut at the B&O Railroad Museum, having been cosmetically restored as American Freedom Train No. 1.

== 2026 Freedom Train attempt ==
Reading No. 2100 was restored to service with intent to pull the 2026 Freedom Train. The locomotive was renumbered as "AFT No. 250" for the United States Semiquincentennial. The locomotive intended to wear a livery identical to Reading No. 2101 during the 1975–1976 Freedom Train. However, on April 15, 2026, Reading No. 2100's excursion as the 2026 Freedom Train was canceled, citing "a lack of financial backing from corporate sponsors, difficulty negotiating access with major freight railroads, and tight timelines leading up to the 2026 semiquincentennial celebration."

On April 28, 2026, Union Pacific Railroad announced that Big Boy No. 4014 would be journeying to the East Coast in collaboration with Norfolk Southern to celebrate America's 250th anniversary. The announcement does not refer specifically to No. 4014's journey as the "Freedom Train", but it includes a Fourth of July celebration in Philadelphia, and more than 50 stops in 10 states.

== See also ==
- Agit-train, a Soviet train of similar purpose
- Crusade for Freedom; a Cold War public relations effort following the first Freedom Train.
- Here Comes the Freedom Train; a song performed by Merle Haggard about the 1975–76 American Freedom Train.
- Freedom Bell, American Legion traveled on the American Freedom Train alongside a Lunar Rover test article.
- The Freedom Train (graffiti); a graffiti artwork painted in 1976 to commemorate the Bicentennial.
