= Showcase =

Showcase or vitrine most often refers to:

- Display case, a glass case for the display and protection of articles in shops or museums

Showcase may also refer to:

== Music ==
- Lonnie Donegan Showcase, 1956
- Showcase (Bill Anderson album), 1964
- Showcase (Patsy Cline album), 1961
- Showcase (Buddy Holly album), 1964
- Showcase (Philly Joe Jones album), 1959
- Showcase (The Sylvers album), 1975
- Showcase (Kitty Wells album), 1968
- The Showcase (album), by Lead, 2016

== Television ==
- Showcase (Australian TV channel), an Australian TV channel
- Showcase (Canadian TV channel), a Canadian cable television network
- Showcase (Indonesian TV channel), an Indonesian cable television network from Transvision.
- Showcase TV, a defunct UK satellite channel
- Sky Showcase, an entertainment channel in the UK and Ireland
- "The Showcase" (The Price Is Right), the final round of the American game show The Price Is Right
- Showcase, a multiplex channel of the Showtime television network in the US
- TVNZ Showcase, the arts and drama service on TVNZ 6

== Other ==
- Showcase (comics), a DC Comics series
- Showcase (retailer), a North American retail company
- Showcase Cinemas, a movie theater chain

== See also ==
- Variety show, an entertainment format showcasing a variety of acts
- Vitrinite reflectance, in sedimentology, a method for identifying the maximum temperature history of sediments
