= Kitty's Choice =

Studio album by Kitty Wells
- Released: 1960
- Genre: Country
- Label: Decca

Kitty Wells chronology
After Dark (1959)	Kitty's Choice (1960)	Seasons of My Heart (1960)

Kitty's Choice is an album recorded by Kitty Wells and released in 1960 on the Decca label (DL 8979). Thom Owens of Allmusic wrote that Wells sang all of the songs "with gusto, making it one of her most enjoyable records of the early '60s."

== Track listing ==
Side 1

1. "Sugartime" (Charlie Phillips, Odis Echols)
2. "Dark Moon" (Ned Miller)
3. "Your Cheatin' Heart" (Hank Williams)
4. "Beautiful Brown Eyes" (Alton Delmore, Arthur Smith)
5. "Seven Lonely Days" (Alden Shuman, Earl Shuman, Marshall Brown)
6. "Half as Much" (Curley Williams)

Side 2

1. "Jambalaya (On the Bayou)" (Hank Williams)
2. "Jealous Heart" (Jenny Lou Carson)
3. "When the Moon Comes over the Mountain" (Harry M. Woods, Howard Johnson, Kate Smith)
4. "Bonaparte's Retreat" (Pee Wee King)
5. "Tennessee Waltz" (Pee Wee King, Redd Stewart)
6. "My Happiness" (Betty Peterson, Borney Bergantine)

== See also ==
- Kitty Wells albums discography
