= Dust on the Bible =

Studio album by Kitty Wells
- Released: 1959
- Genre: Country, gospel
- Label: Decca

Kitty Wells chronology
Lonely Street (1958)	Dust on the Bible (1959)	After Dark (1959)

Dust on the Bible is an album recorded by Kitty Wells and released in 1959 on the Decca label (DL 8858). The Encyclopedia of American Gospel Music called it "a classic of country-style gospel."

Bailes brothers wrote and recorded in 1947

== Reception ==
Thom Owens of Allmusic called the album "a moving set of country gospel performed with affection and honesty."

The Rolling Stone Album Guide gave the album three stars and called it "a stirring collection of gospel numbers."

== Track listing ==
Side A

1. "Dust on the Bible" (Johnnie Bailes, Walter Bailes) - 2:17
2. "I Dreamed I Searched Heaven for You" (James D. Vaughn, Mary Ethel Weiss) - 2:30
3. "Lonesome Valley" (A. P. Carter) - 2:16
4. "My Loved Ones Are Waiting for Me" (James D. Vaughn) - 2:04
5. "I Heard My Savior Call" (Johnnie Bailes) - 2:03
6. "The Great Speckled Bird" - 2:20

Side B

1. "He Will Set Your Fields On Fire" (C.M. Ballew, Veona Braskett) - 2:20
2. "We Buried Her Beneath the Willows" (Cumberland Ridge Runners) - 2:34
3. "One-Way Ticket to the Sky" (Johnnie Bailes, Walter Bailes) - 2:32
4. "I Need the Prayers" (James D. Vaughn) - 2:26
5. "Matthew Twenty-Four" (Lonnie Glosson) - 2:00
6. "Lord I'm Coming Home" (William J. Kirkpatrick) - 2:15

== See also ==
- Kitty Wells albums discography
