= Freedom Bell, American Legion =

Public artwork in Washington, D.C.

- Sculpture in 2010
- Year: Cast in 1975, dedicated in 1981
- Type: Bronze
- Location: Washington, D.C.; 38°53′47.6″N 77°0′23.53″W
- Owner: National Park Service

Freedom Bell, American Legion, is a public artwork located at Union Station in Washington, D.C., United States. A replica of the Liberty Bell, Freedom Bell, American Legion was surveyed as part of the Smithsonian's American Art Museum's Inventories of American Painting and Sculpture database in 1985.

== Description ==
The sculpture is a 2:1 scale replica of the Liberty Bell. The bell, which was cast by Petit & Fritsen, weighs 8 tons and has a support structure of post and beam style with two concrete shafts. Set into the paving in front of the bell is a plaque that reads:

The Freedom Bell

Dedicated to
The Spirit of the Bicentennial
on Behalf of
The Children of Our Nation
Given By
The American Legion
And
American Legion Auxiliary
1981

== History ==
The bell, a Bicentennial gift from the American Legion, is a model of the bell on display at the American Legion Headquarters in Indianapolis, Indiana. Authorized by Congress on October 12, 1976, it was cast outside of the US because no foundry had the capacity to cast the bell.

When the bell was completed it was shipped to Baltimore and then traveled to all 48 contiguous states aboard the American Freedom Train for the Bicentennial, starting on April 1, 1975, in Wilmington, Delaware, and ending December 31, 1976, in Miami, Florida. The bell shared train car No. 41 (later renumbered 40) with a map of the American Freedom Train's journey and a lunar rover. From 1977 to 1978 the bell was placed in National Park Service storage until lengthy discussions led to an agreement and the bell was placed at Union Station in 1981. The American Legion, who hoped for placement at the National Mall, were unhappy with the bell's placement.

In 2024, the bell was covered with graffiti by pro-Palestinian protesters, protesting Israel's action in the ongoing Gaza war and calling for Intifada and the dismantlement of the State of Israel and the United States, which coincided with a speech to the U.S. Congress by Israeli Prime Minister Benjamin Netanyahu.

== Artist ==
The details of the casting were handled by I. T. Verdin Company of Cincinnati, Ohio. Jack Patrick served as associate architect for the sculpture and Allen J. Wright Associates created the post and beam support for the bell. The iron work was completed by Fred S. Gichner Iron Works.

== See also ==
- List of public art in Washington, D.C., Ward 6
