= Agit-train =

Train used to promote communism during and after the Russian Civil War

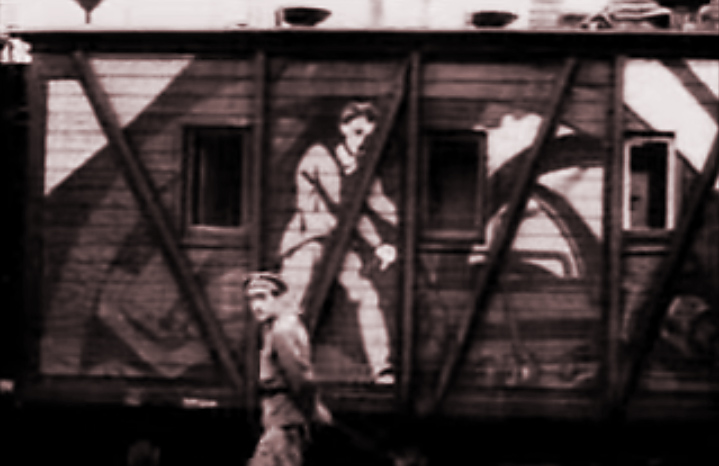
Section of a painted car of a Soviet "agit-train" from a 1921 newsreel.

An agit-train (Russian: агитпоезд) was a locomotive engine with special auxiliary cars outfitted for propaganda purposes by the Bolshevik government of Soviet Russia during the time of the Russian Civil War, War Communism, and the New Economic Policy. Brightly painted and carrying on board a printing press, government complaint office, printed political leaflets and pamphlets, library books, and a mobile movie theater, agit-trains traveled the rails of Russia, Siberia, and Ukraine in an attempt to introduce the values and program of the new revolutionary government to a scattered and isolated peasantry.

Launched in August 1918, agit-trains — and their close counterparts, the urban agit-streetcar (Russian: агиттрамвай), the railway agit-station (Russian: агитпункт), and the aquatic agit-boat (Russian: агитпараход) — continued in limited use throughout the 1920s. The agit-train concept was revived during the years of World War II as a mechanism for the direct spread of information during a time when ordinary means of communication and government control structures between the center and the periphery had faltered.

== History ==
=== Background ===
During the Russian Civil War of 1918 to 1922, military operations across the vast Russian frontier tended to follow the thin network of rail lines interspersed throughout the country. The front line between the Red Army of the revolutionary Bolshevik government and those of the so-called White movement of counterrevolutionary forces moved back and forth, with towns and districts moving from the control of one group to the other. The penetration of new Bolshevik government institutions and functionaries outside of major metropolitan areas was extremely weak.

From the start of the civil war, trains had previously been used to dispatch agitational speakers and printed propaganda materials to the front to shore up support for the revolutionary regime among the volunteers and conscripts of the Red Army and Red Army chief Leon Trotsky had gone so far as to set up his permanent headquarters aboard a railroad car to enable himself and the general staff to move easily from one military hotspot to another.

=== Establishment ===
Crowds would be gathered around agit-trains and modern technology such as phonographs and moving pictures demonstrated to a poor rural audience to emphasize the modernizing agenda of the Soviet regime. (1921 newsreel footage).

In the summer of 1918 the Military Section of the Executive Committee of the All-Russian Congress of Soviets determined to expand the role of trains beyond that of the occasional distribution of leaflets, establishing a permanent "agit-train" (agitpoyezd) for the dedicated purpose of agitation and propaganda (agitprop), the V.I. Lenin. The train was first used on the Volga front on August 13, 1918.

The regime also made use of the brightly bedecked "agit-streetcar" (agittramvai) as a crowd-gathering device for outdoor dramatic performances in urban settings from 1918.

=== Development ===
The initial effort of the V.I. Lenin was deemed by the Bolshevik government to be so successful that five additional agit-trains were immediately ordered to be created. This new fleet of agit-trains was put under the direction of a special commission established for that precise purpose in January 1919.

In addition to their obvious use as a tool for spreading of information and ideas favorable to the revolutionary regime, the agit-trains served as a mechanism for certain Soviet leaders to gain first-hand information about the situation in the country outside of its urban centers. Those participating in the activities of the agit-train October Revolution at various times included People's Commissar of Justice D. K. Kursky, People's Commissar of Health N. A. Semashko, People's Commissar of the Interior G. I. Petrovsky, and People's Commissar of Enlightenment Anatoly Lunacharsky.

The agit-trains also attracted the direct participation of Bolshevik political leaders. The best known of the agit-trains, the October Revolution, counted among its complement Mikhail Kalinin as its political commissar, who spent the bulk of the civil war years riding the rails — with the train making a dozen trips in 1919 alone, each averaging about three weeks. Throughout the year the train followed the moving military front in an effort to bolster morale of the Red Army soldiers engaged in hostilities and to build support for the revolution in the towns and populated enclaves located just back of the skirmish lines.

Kalinin would emphasize his own peasant background when speaking to rural audiences, calling village meetings and inquiring about requisition payments and land redistribution — sensitive matters of great concern to the poor farming– population. More controversial aspects of Soviet policy like restrictions on grain trade were contextualized in terms of their end goal to benefit all, and passionate appeals were made to the peasantry to voluntarily donate food to the starving cities.

Official Soviet statistics — likely inflated to some extent — indicated that over the course of 1919 and 1920 agit-trains and agit-boats and activists riding bicycles visited 4,000 offices and factories, conducted 1,891 meetings, gave more than 1,000 lectures, and distributed about 1.5 million leaflets and newspapers. A total audience of more than 2 million was claimed for the cinematic presentations of the trains and boats during these years.

=== Structure and scope ===
A key part of agit-trains were their special cars for presentation of motion pictures to tightly packed audiences — frequently the first exposure of rural Russians to the medium. (1921 newsreel footage).

Agit-trains were frequently 16 to 18 cars in length. They were brightly colored, bearing flags with the cars brightly painted with slogans and political art. Leading Bolshevik artists such as Vladimir Mayakovsky (1893–1930), El Lissitsky (1890–1941), and Kazimir Malevich (1878–1935) were commissioned to paint car exteriors and their work was bold and memorable, albeit sometimes criticized as too abstract for a poorly educated and largely uncultured rural audience.

Each car featured a selection of political pamphlets, posters, and newspapers for distribution, and a small library. Trains also included a mobile darkroom for the development of photographs. A key element of the trains was a special film exhibition car, in which politically oriented silent movies were shown. This represented for many peasants their first exposure to the medium of film and it proved very useful to reach a largely illiterate and multi-lingual audience with simple messaging around the new revolutionary government. During its first year of operation the agit-train October Revolution conducted 430 free film showings, reaching an audience estimated in the hundreds of thousands.

=== The agit-boat Red Star ===
Inspired by the success of its agit-train program, in 1919 the same principle was applied to an aquatic vehicle, the steamer Krasnaia zvesda (Red Star). This vessel spent several months in 1919 and the summer of 1920 sailing up and down the Volga River, frequently docking and allowing the boarding of visitors. The Red Star presented more than 400 film shows during its two-year tenure, reaching more than half a million viewers.

As with the agit-trains, the Red Star included among its most active participants leaders from the highest levels of the Russian Communist Party, including V. M. Molotov as its political commissar and Lenin's wife, Nadezhda Krupskaya, a top official in the People's Commissariat of Enlightenment. Krupskaya later indicated that Lenin was "raring to go himself but he could not leave his work even for a moment."

=== Termination and legacy ===
During the years of World War II, the Soviet government revived the use of agit-trains to bolster support for the government among the soldiery in the face of the fascist offensive.

== List of agit-trains ==
- Krasnyi kazak (Red Cossack)
- Krasnyi vostok (Red East)
- Sovetskii kavkaz (Soviet Caucasus)
- Oktiabrskaia revoliutsiia (October Revolution)
- V.I. Lenin

== See also ==
- Agitprop
- Cinema of the Soviet Union
- Freedom Train, an American train of similar purpose
