= Kitty Wells' Country Hit Parade =

Studio album by Kitty Wells
- Released: 1956
- Genre: Country
- Label: Decca

Kitty Wells chronology
Kitty Wells' Country Hit Parade (1956)	Winner of Your Heart (1956)

Kitty Wells' Country Hit Parade is an album by Kitty Wells that was released in 1956 on the Decca label (DL 8293). Joe Viglione of Allmusic.com gave it four stars and called it "groundbreaking", "a classic of the genre", and "entertaining beyond its historical importance."

== Track listing ==
Side A

1. "Making Believe" (Jimmy Work) - 2:51
2. "Release Me" (Dub Williams, Eddie Miller, Robert Yount) - 2:47
3. "Cheatin's a Sin" (Billy Wallace) - 2:47
4. "There's Poison In Your Heart (Zeke Clements) - 2:34
5. "I've Kissed You My Last Time" (Bill Carlisle, T. Tommy Cutrer, Virginia Suber) - 2:25
6. "Whose Shoulder Will You Cry On" (Billy Wallace, Kitty Wells) - 2:13

Side B

1. "It Wasn't God Who Made Honky Tonk Angels" (J. D. "Jay" Miller) - 2:29
2. "The Things I Might Have Been" (Richard M. Sherman, Robert B. Sherman) - 2:21
3. "Paying for That Back Street Affair" (Billy Wallace, Jimmy Rule) - 2:36
4. "I Don't Claim to Be an Angel" (Jack Anglin, Jim Anglin, Johnny Wright) - 2:55
5. "I'm Too Lonely to Smile" (Harmie Smith) - 2:21
6. "Searching For a Soldier's Grave" (Roy Acuff) - 3:12

== See also ==
- Kitty Wells albums discography
