= Seasons of My Heart (Kitty Wells album) =

Studio album by Kitty Wells
- Released: 1960
- Genre: Country
- Label: Decca

Kitty Wells chronology
Kitty's Choice (1960)	Seasons of My Heart (1960)	Golden Favorites (1962)

Seasons of My Heart is an album by Kitty Wells that was released in 1960 on the Decca label (DL 4075). Thom Owens of Allmusic called the album "an excellent LP collection of country ballads."

== Track listing ==
Side 1

1. "Seasons of My Heart" (Darrell Edwards, George Jones) [2:39]
2. "The Only One I Ever Loved I Lost" (Jack Anglin, Jim Anglin, Johnny Wright) [2:24]
3. "Most of All" (Hank Thompson) [2:28]
4. "Lonely Is a Word" (John D. Loudermilk) [2:00]
5. "Fickle Fun" (Bill Anderson) [2:31]
6. "The Hands You're Holding Now (Marty Robbins) [2:23]

Side 2

1. "Send Me the Pillow You Dream On" (Hank Locklin) [2:36]
2. "Amigo's Guitar" (John D. Loudermilk, Kitty Wells, Roy Bodkin) [2:36]
3. "Let Me Help You Forget" (Jim Anglin) [2:40]
4. "I'll Be All Smiles Tonight" (Kitty Wells) [2:58]
5. "The Other Cheek" (Wayne P. Walker) [2:34]
6. "If I Had the Right to Do You Wrong" (John D. Loudermilk) [2:42]

== See also ==
- Kitty Wells albums discography
