= The Kitty Wells Show =

Live album by Kitty Wells
- Released: 1966
- Genre: Country
- Label: Decca

Kitty Wells chronology
Country All the Way (1966)	The Kitty Wells Show (1966)	Love Makes the World Go Around (1967)

The Kitty Wells Show is a live album recorded at a concert by Kitty Wells, her son Bobby Wright, her husband Johnny Wright, singer Bill Phillips, and musicians Tommy Jackson, Paul Yandell and Odell Martin. The album was released in 1966 on the Decca label (DL 4831) in the United States and on the Brunswick label (LAT 8674) in the United Kingdom.

Wells sings on four of the album's tracks, including a live version of her signature song, "It Wasn't God Who Made Honky Tonk Angels". One of the songs from the album, "It's All Over (But the Crying)", reached No. 14 on the Billboard country chart in July 1966.

Thom Owens of Allmusic called it "entertaining" and "fun".

== Track listing ==
Side A

1. Tommy Jackson, Introduction: "Sugar in the Gourd" [0:45]
2. Kitty Wells, "You Left Your Mark On Me" [2:23]
3. Kitty Wells, "It's All Over (But the Crying)" [2:25]
4. Paul Yandell, "These Boots Are Made for Walking" [2:20]
5. Bill Phillips, "Lonely Street" [2:45]
6. Bobby Wright, "Act Naturally" [2:30]
7. Johnny Wright, "Don't Give Up the Ship" [2:00]
8. Tommy Jackson, Ending: "Sugar in the Gourd" [0:45]

Side B

1. Tommy Jackson, Introduction: "Porked Deer" [0:35]
2. Kitty Wells, "Love's Enough for Me" [2:25]
3. Kitty Wells, "It Wasn't God Who Made Honky Tonk Angels" [2:25]
4. Paul Yandell And Odell Martin, "Jamaican Reel" [2:00]
5. Bill Phillips, "The Lies Just Can't Be True" [2:13]
6. Bobby Wright, "Singing Country Music Loud and Strong" [1:42]
7. Johnny Wright, "Can the Circle Be Unbroken" [2:05]
8. Tommy Jackson, Ending: "Porked Deer" [0:45]
