= Love Makes the World Go Around =

Studio album by Kitty Wells
- Released: 1967
- Genre: Country
- Label: Decca

Kitty Wells chronology
The Kitty Wells Show (1966)	Love Makes the World Go Around (1967)	Together Again (1967)

Love Makes the World Go Around is an album recorded by Kitty Wells and released in 1967 on the Decca label (DL 4857) in the United States and on the Brunswick label (LAT 8683) in the United Kingdom.

The album's title track, "Love Makes the World Go Around", was one of Wells' final hits, peaking at No. 34 on the Billboard country chart. Another song from the album, "Only Me and My Hairdresser Know", reached No. 49 on the same chart.

Thom Owens of AllMusic opined that the production was "too lush for Kitty's honky tonk roots."

== Track listing ==
Side A

1. "Love Makes the World Go Around" [2:07]
2. "Touch My Heart" [2:40]
3. "I'm Living in Two Worlds" [2:26]
4. "Stand Beside Me" [2:27]
5. "I'm Just Not Smart" [2:40]
6. "Get Your Lie the Way You Want" [2:19]

Side B

1. "The Hurtin's All Over" [2:30]
2. "Baby's Coming Home" [2:30]
3. "There Goes My Everything" [2:32]
4. "Only Me and My Hairdresser Know" [2:55]
5. "Once" [2:10]
6. "Coming On Strong" [2:40]
