= We'll Stick Together =

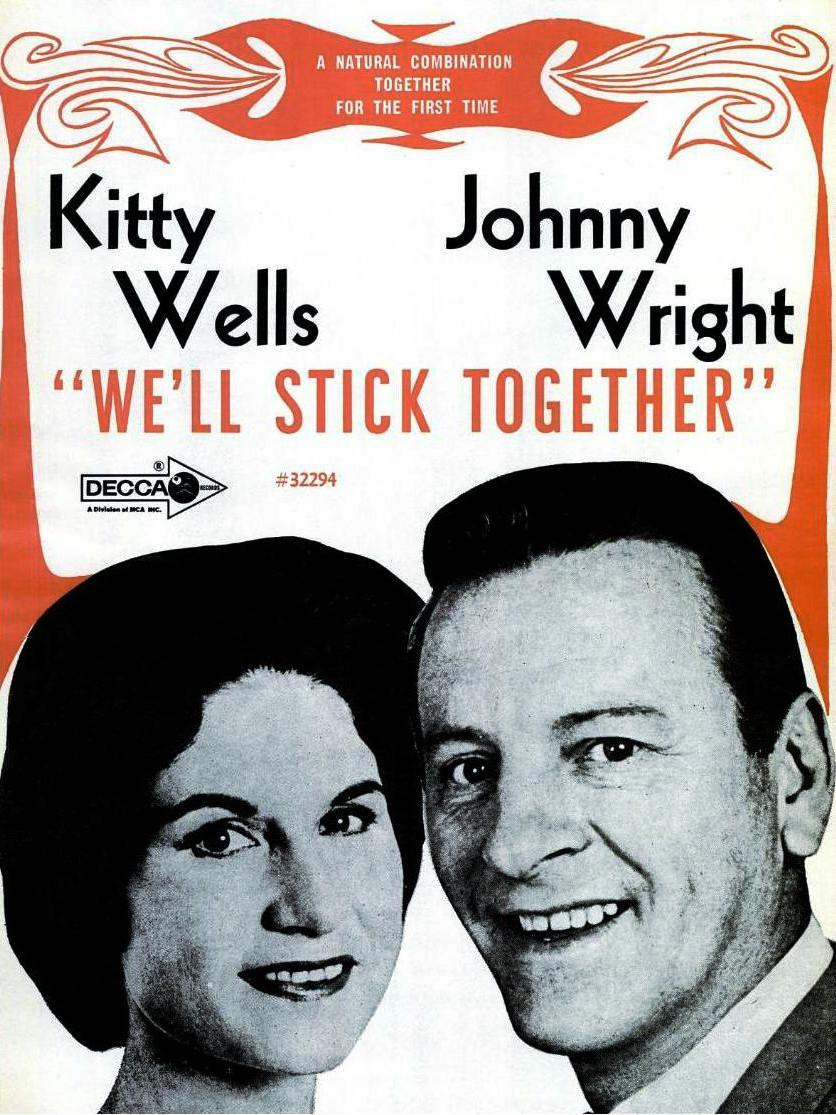

Studio album by Kitty Wells, Johnny Wright
- Released: 1968
- Genre: Country
- Label: Decca

Kitty Wells, Johnny Wright chronology
Showcase (June 1968)	We'll Stick Together (1968)

We'll Stick Together is both a single and an album of duets between Kitty Wells and her husband Johnny Wright. Both were released in 1968 on the Decca label.

== The song ==
The single was a duet between Wells and Wright. Sources are in conflict as to whether the song was written by their son, Bobby Wright, or by Bill Phillips. The single was released by Decca in May 1968 with "Heartbreak Waltz" as the "A" side. At the time, Billboard wrote: "First disk duet for the husband and wife team should fast prove sales giant. Two equally potent sides."

Though Wells and Wright were one of the best known couples in country music, We'll Stick Together was the only record on which they charted together. The song was later rated as one of the two best duets between Wells and Wright. The song was one of Wells' final hit singles, as the years after 1968 brought a "long dry spell" as a crossover style dominated the country chats and Wells asked to be released from her "life-time" contract with Decca/MCA.

The song's chorus recited the following lyrics:

"Cause we stuck together through the lean lean years

The lean and hungry years were filled with strife Now we're still together in the green green years

And we'll still together for the rest of our life"

After the release of the song, Wells and Wright began touring together in their own Kitty Wells-Johnny Wright Family Show. Wells and Wright continued performing We'll Stick Together, often with their son Bobby, and sometimes as their finale, at concerts through the 1980s and 1990s. One reviewer in 1987 called the performance "a heartwarming experience" and described the song as "prophetic" in light of the couple’s longevity in remaining married for more than 50 years. Another concert review from 1987 noted that "many audience members stood to applaud" when Wells sang "We'll Stick Together" with her husband and son.

== The album ==
The album (Decca DL 75026) was released in June 1968 and reached No. 30 on the U.S. country albums chart. Though Wells and Wright were described as "probably country music's longest running act -- both professionally and maritally", the album marked the first release of music they recorded together. In its review of the album upon its release, Billboard wrote:

Kitty Wells and Johnny Wright, Mr. and Mrs. in real life, are coupled on records for the first time on this album. They raise the tradition of the country duet to a high art.

Another reviewer wrote that the album "leaves one wondering why they waited so long" to release a joint album and recommended several of the tracks, including the title track.

The Jordanaires provided backup vocals and music on the album.

=== Track listing ===
Side A

1. "We'll Stick Together" (Bill Phillips) [2:34]
2. "We Must Have Been Out of Our Minds" (Melba Montgomery) [2:22]
3. "One by One" (Jack Anglin, Jim Anglin, Johnny Wright) [2:47]
4. "Happiness Means You" (Jim Anglin) [2:18]
5. "Living as Strangers" (Bill Phillips, Jean Stromatt) [2:58]
6. "I Can't Stop Loving You" (Don Gibson) [2:18]

Side B

1. "Holding On to Nothing" (Jerry Chestnut) [2:18]
2. "Heartbreak Waltz" (Johnny Wright, Rusty Gabbard] (2:03]
3. "Ashes of Love" (Jack Anglin, Jim Anglin, Johnny Wright) [1:57]
4. "You and Me" (Jack Anglin, Jim Anglin, Johnny Wright) [2:40]
5. "My Elusive Dreams" (Billy Sherrill, Curly Putman) [2:39]
