= Mobile museum =

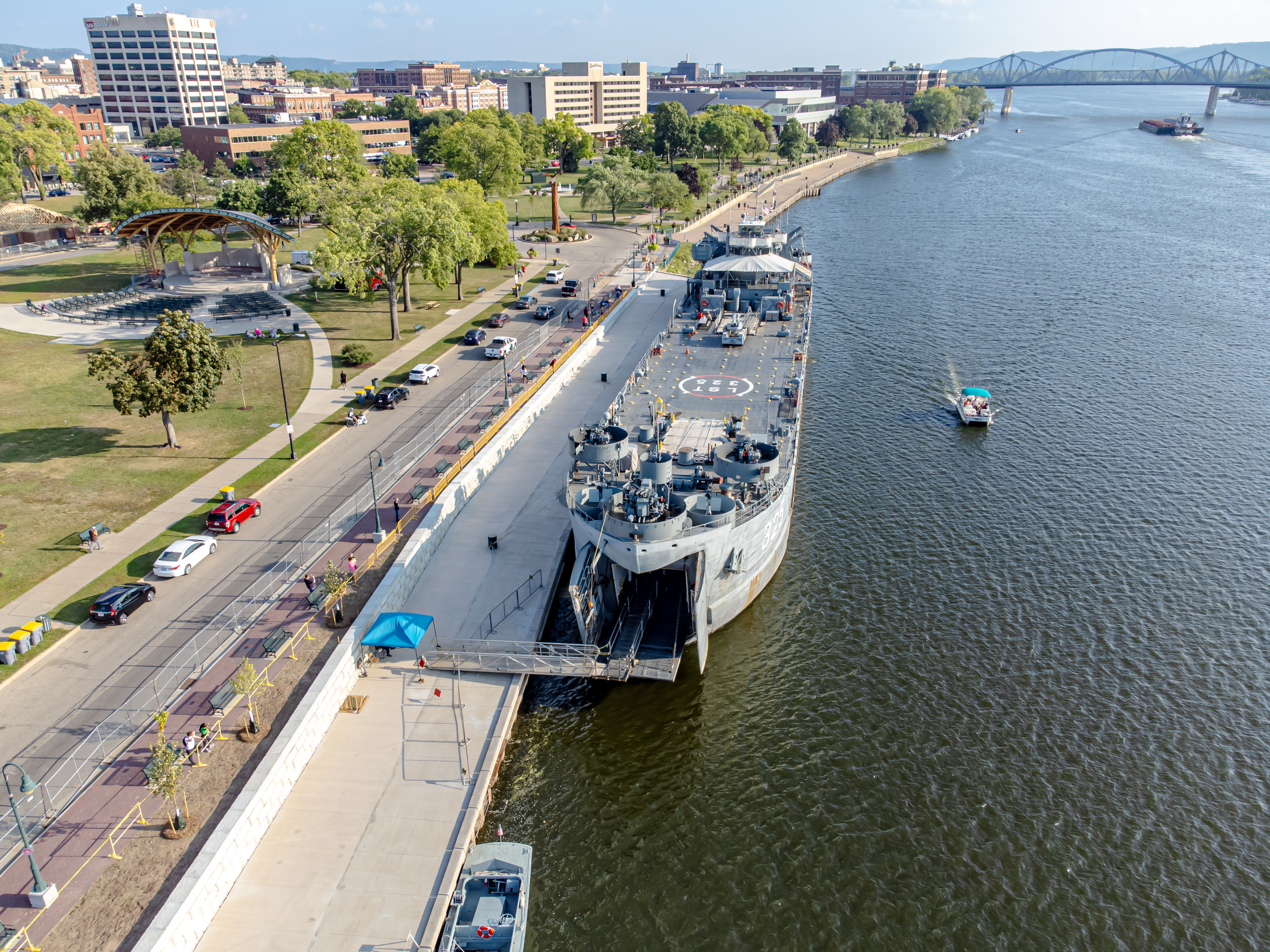
USS LST-325 as a mobile museum in La Crosse, Wisconsin

A mobile museum is a museum educational outreach program that bring the museum to the people rather than vice versa. Typically they can be in Recreational Vehicles (RVs) or trucks/trailers that drive to schools, libraries and rural events. Their business model is to use grant or donor support, as they goal is to make the museum exhibit accessible to underserved populations. Below are some examples of mobile museums.

== TAME Trailblazer ==
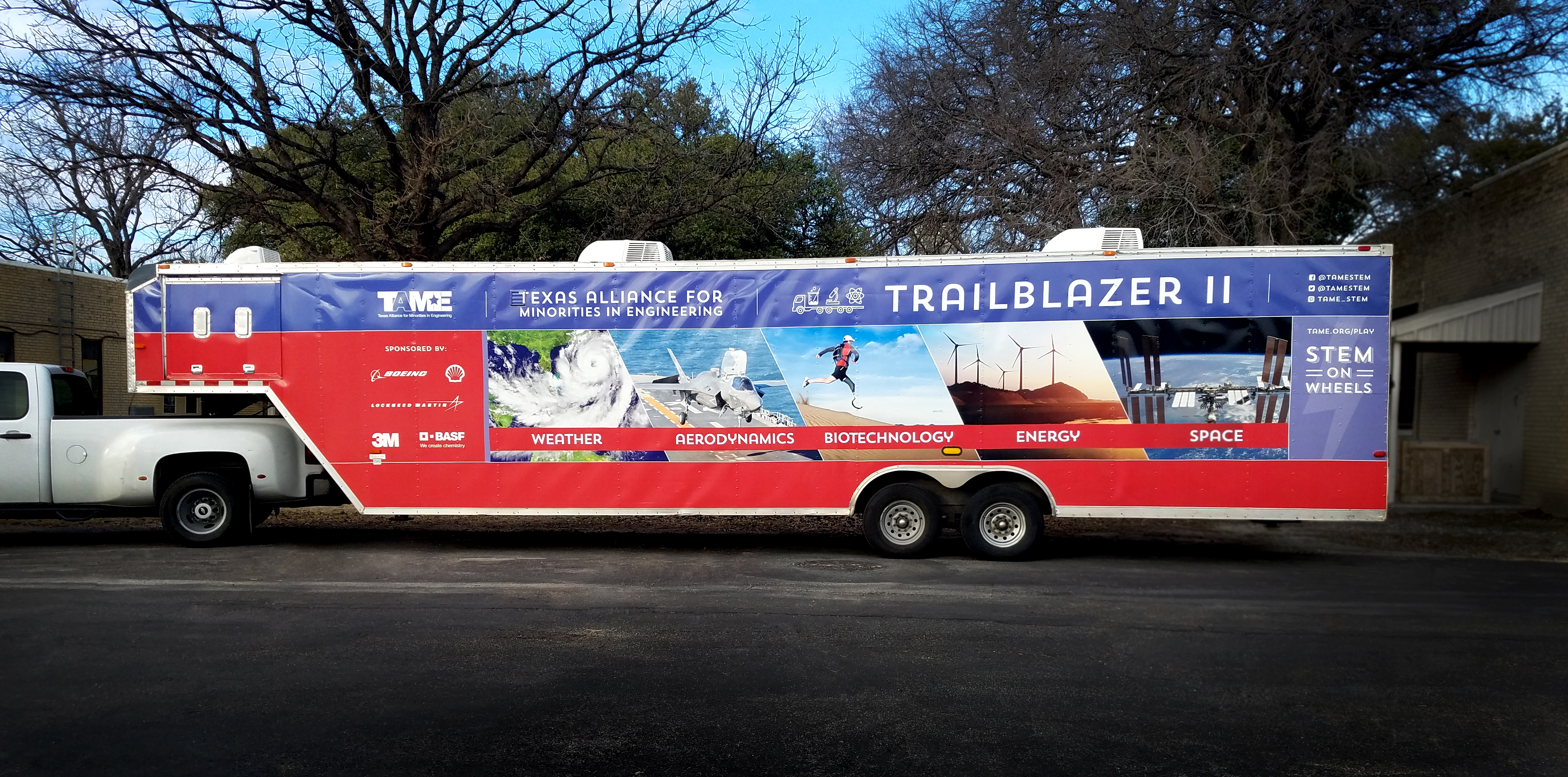
Profile view of the Trailblazer II mobile STEM museum, taken in January 2018 in Austin, Texas. (Note: Photo features a 40 ft trailer attached to a pickup truck, with colorful images on the side to show what exhibits the museum houses. These images include: a hurricane for weather, a fighter jet for aerodynamics, an athlete with a J-leg prosthetic for biotechnology, wind turbines on a hillside for energy, and the International Space Station for space)

The Texas Alliance for Minorities in Engineering (TAME) is a nonprofit founded in 1976 that maintains two traveling STEM-museums-on-wheels that visit thousands of students a year across Texas. Established in 1980 as the Expo-Tex traveling engineering exhibit, the Trailblazer program expanded in 2013 to a fleet of two upgraded 40-ft trailers. Both Trailblazer I and Trailblazer II contain five interactive STEM exhibit areas: Aerodynamics, Biotechnology, Energy, Space, and Weather. Exhibits include Robotic Surgery, Van de Graaff Generators, Virtual Reality Spacewalk, Green Screen Technology, Thermal Imaging, Wind Tunnels, and more.

"The Trailblazers invite everyone to get excited about the world around us, from outer space to inside the human body. Based out of Austin, Texas, the Trailblazer program reaches potential where it lives, bringing interactive exhibits to communities all across the state of Texas. Students visiting the Trailblazer are stepping into a network that is designed to support them as they advance—from after-school TAME Clubs to STEM Competitions, and on to college scholarships and mentoring."

== VanGo! Museum on Wheels ==
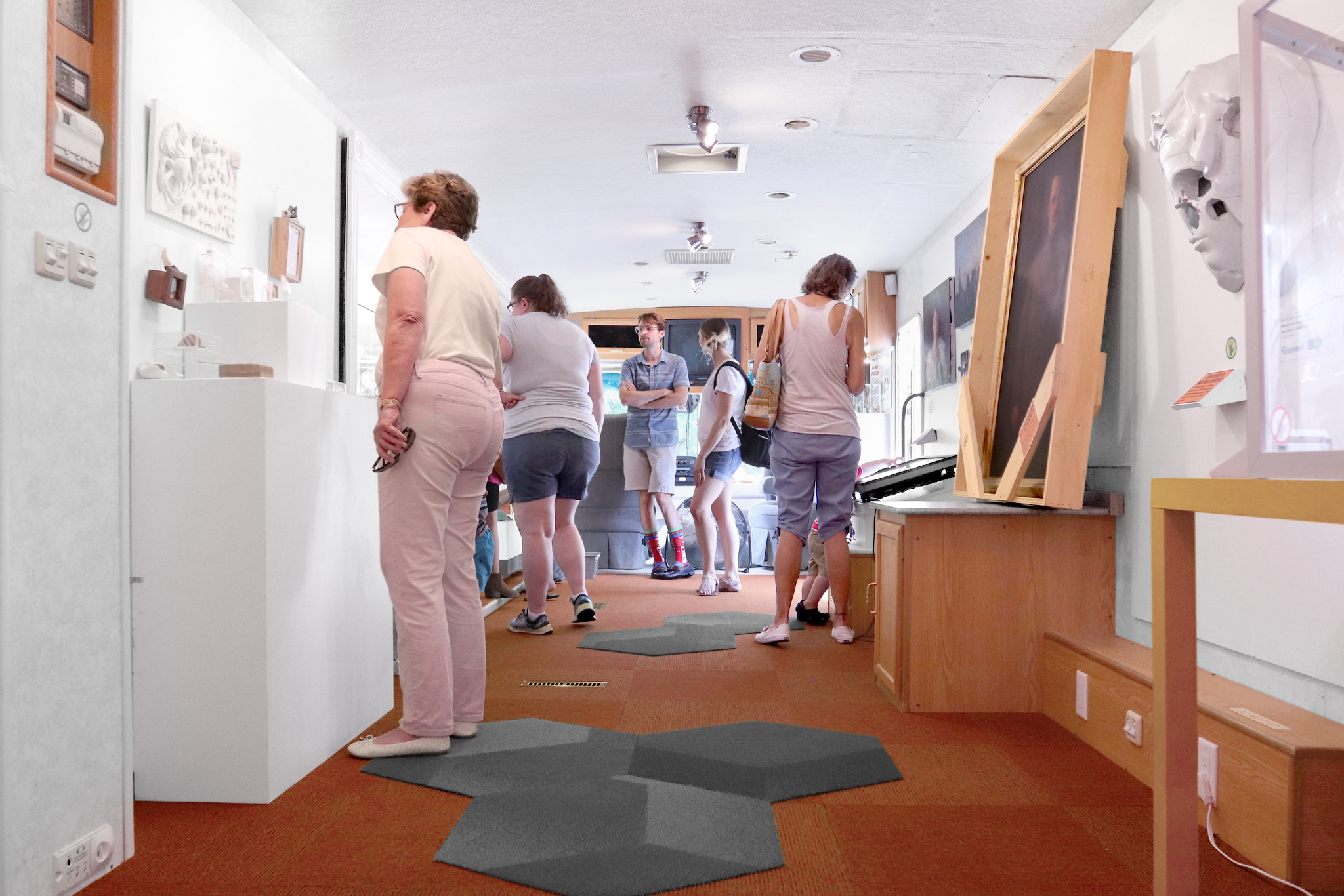
Visitors exploring an art exhibition in the VanGo

The "VanGo" was founded in 1992 by the Susquehanna Art Museum in Harrisburg, Pennsylvania. The program gives visitors an authentic art museum experience on board a vehicle retrofitted with a gallery space. Since its inception, the VanGo program has occupied three vehicles: a city transportation bus, a school bus, and presently a 31-foot-long Winnebago Sightseer. Annually rotating exhibitions feature original artworks in a variety of media. In addition, visitors learn about careers, museum etiquette, and art history through a variety of interactive stations.

== Moveable museum ==
The Moveable Museum was produced and managed by the American Museum of Natural History in New York City (NYC) under the auspices of the Gottesman Center for Science Teaching and Learning. The program was available free of charge to all schools in the five boroughs of New York City. The Moveable Museum formerly included vehicles about paleontology, anthropology, and astronomy. The Moveable Museum program was in operation from 1993 through 2012, in which time it visited over 700 schools in NYC and many libraries. The Paleontology of Dinosaurs (Grades K-2) was active from 1998 through 2012, and focused on teaching children how paleontologists use fossils to study dinosaurs and other ancient life. The Structures & Culture (Grades 3–8) exhibit let students study actual pieces of material culture, and become anthropologists while investigating how culture allows people to use various environmental resources to meet basic human needs.

The Dinosaurs: Ancient Fossils, New Discoveries mobile museum was donated to the Institute for the Study of Mongolian Dinosaurs in 2013 and remains in operation as of 2024. The Paleontology of Dinosaurs is the oldest vehicle in operation. The Structures & Culture allows students to enter the homes of three modern nomadic cultures, the Gabra of Kenya, the Mongols of Mongolia and the Blackfeet of Montana. Discovering the Universe (Grades 6–12) resides at the Suffolk County Vanderbilt Planetarium.

== Other mobile museums ==
ANO Mobile Museum

Created to travel into communities in Ghana by Nana Oforiatta Ayim and the ANO Institute of Arts and Knowledge. In The Guardian, Charlotte Jansen writes: "Ayim said she started to reflect on the museum model in Africa while working at the British Museum. Struck by how differently African objects were encountered in display cabinets in the UK with how they were actively used in festivals back home, she began to think about how material culture could be preserved and presented in a way that was more in keeping with local traditions."

Mundaring Travelling Museum

A purpose-built enclosed trailer featuring artefacts and photographs from the areas in the Shire of Mundaring. The Mundaring Travelling Museum was official opened at the 2019 Blue Sky Festival, by Cr John Saw (Shire President), Owen Briffa (Curator) and Matthew Hughes (MLA - Kalamunda). Located in the Perth Hills, the Travelling Museum visits schools, special celebrations and local community events.

Shark in a bus

An ex MTT Perth 1957 vintage Leyland Worldmaster Bus featuring a 5 m long great white shark (White Pointer) and hundreds of marine objects collected around Australia primarily in the 1960s and '70s. This private collection tours Australia and contains the shark purported to have inspired the artist Damien Hirst. Shark in a Bus is completely self funded.

Van of Enchantment

A pair of RV museum vans with themes related to cultural history that operates in New Mexico and is run by the New Mexico Department of Cultural Affairs, with primary funding from the Department of Transportation. The grant-supported program focuses on children in elementary schools, especially those in remote and rural communities.

Strange Old Things

Based in Surrey, UK, it aims to tell the story of world conflict through interaction with items from various periods. It specialises in bringing the history of conflict to people who may, for whatever reason, find it difficult to access a traditional museum experience. Currently funded by donation, it focusses on donations of objects from the public to keep the collection eclectic.

Go van Gogh (Dallas Museum of Art)

School outreach program targeting children in school grades 1–6, operating in North Texas, USA.

Mobile Museum of Tolerance

Owned and operated by the Simon Wiesenthal Center, a Los-Angeles based Jewish human rights organization, the Mobile Museum of Tolerance (MMOT) provides free educational programs on the Holocaust, civil rights, and digital media literacy for schools and communities. The first MMOT began traveling in Illinois in 2021, with additional exhibits launching in California, New York, Florida, and Hawaii. The organization's Canadian affiliate, the Friends of the Simon Wiesenthal Center, has operated the Tour for Humanity since 2013.

== See also ==
- Virtual museums — museum exhibits that are online
