= Forever Young (Kitty Wells album) =

Studio album by Kitty Wells
- Released: 1974
- Genre: Country
- Label: Capricorn

Forever Young is an album from Kitty Wells that was released in 1974 on the Capricorn label.

The album was Wells' first after leaving Decca Records and signing with Capricorn Records in Macon, Georgia. Instead of recording with the Nashville musicians she had known for years, she was backed by "long-haired" rock musicians, including pianist Chuck Leavell of The Allman Brothers Band and Toy Caldwell of The Marshall Tucker Band.

The song, "Forever Young", was released as a single before the release of the album. It was used by Bruce Springsteen as the first song played on the public address system following the conclusion of each concert on his 2023 world tour. Speaking to the difference between her Nashville sessions and her experience at Capricorn, Wells noted that she was accustomed to cutting four songs in a three-hour session in Nashville, whereas Capricorn spent 12 hours just on a single track, "Forever Young".

Allmusic gave the album two-and-a-half stars. The album was also panned at the time of its release by critic Gary Palmer who wrote: "'Kitty Wells Forever Young' is enough to make you grow old fast."

== Track listing ==
Side A

1. "Too Much Love Between Us" (Ed Bruce, Tom McKeon) [2:37]
2. "Forever Young" (Bob Dylan) [5:18]
3. "Too Stubborn" (Toy Caldwell) [2:46]
4. "I've Been Loving You Too Long (To Stop Now)" (Jerry Butler, Otis Redding) [2:17]
5. "What About You" (Jack Anglin, Johnny Wright (2)

3:12

Side B

1. "My Love Never Changes" (Alfred Scala, Emanuel Roth) [2:27]
2. "Don't Stop The Honeymoon In My Heart" (Mike Duke, Tippy Armstrong) [3:26]
3. "The Loving's Over" (Ginger Boatwright) [3:08]
4. "Do Right Woman, Do Right Man" (Dan Penn, Wayne Norman Lincoln) [3:06]
5. "Till I Can Make It On My Own" (Arthur Owens, Jerry McBee) [2:38]
