= After Dark (Kitty Wells album) =

Studio album by Kitty Wells
- Released: 1959
- Genre: Country
- Label: Decca

Kitty Wells chronology
Dust on the Bible (1959)	After Dark (1959)	Kitty's Choice (1960)

After Dark is an album recorded by Kitty Wells and released in 1959 on the Decca label (DL 8888). On its release, Billboard praised the "haunting nasal quality" of her voice and called the album another "great collection of ballads having to do with the seamy and sinful sides of life, sung as only Kitty Wells can sing them."

== Track listing ==
Side 1

1. "After Dark" (Kitty Wells) - 2:48
2. "Your Wild Life's Gonna Get You Down" (Bob Gallion) - 2:38
3. "You're Not That Easy to Forget" (Henry Davis, Wilbur Jones) - 2:36
4. "I Heard the Jukebox Playing" (Kitty Wells, Linda Bagget, Webb Pierce) - 2:12
5. "Lonely Side of Town" (Roy Botkin) - 2:37
6. "My Used to Be Darling" (Billy Wallace, Vic McAlpin) - 2:23

Side 2

1. "He's Married to Me" (Bill Carrigan, Elmer Alley, Ernie Keller) - 2:28
2. "Honky Tonk Waltz" (Billy Wallace) - 2:30
3. "I'm Tired of Pretending" (Hank Thompson) - 2:38
4. "Divided by Two" (Red Wortham) - 2:20
5. "Beside You" (Jim Anglin) - 2:37
6. "They Can't Take Your Love" (May Hawks) - 2:29
