= Lonely Street (Kitty Wells album) =

Studio album by Kitty Wells
- Released: 1958
- Genre: Country
- Label: Decca

Kitty Wells chronology
Winner of Your Heart (1956)	Lonely Street (1958)	Dust on the Bible (1959)

Lonely Street is an album recorded by Kitty Wells and released in 1958 on the Decca label (DL 8732). Thom Owens of AllMusic found it "slightly uneven but enjoyable". On November 17, 1958, it was ranked No. 9 on Billboard magazine's "Favorite C&W Albums" based on the magazine's annual poll of country and western disc jockeys.

== Track listing ==
Side A

1. "If Teardrops Were Pennies" (Carl Butler)
2. "Lonely Street" (Carl Belew, Kenny Sowder, W.S. Stevenson)
3. "You Can't Conceal a Broken Heart" (Johnny Wright, Wally Fowler)
4. "Sweeter Than the Flowers" (Ervin Rouse, Murray Burns, Lois Mann)
5. "What About You" (Johnny Wright, Jack Anglin)
6. "Just When I Needed You" (Clyde Bau, Johnny Wright, Jack Anglin)

Side B

1. "That's Me Without You" (J.D. Miller, Bennett Wyatt)
2. "The Waltz of the Angels" (Dick Reynolds, Jack Rhodes)
3. "Cheated Out of Love" (Johnny Masters)
4. "May You Never Be Alone" (Hank Williams)
5. "Touch and Go Heart" (Rusty Gabbard)
6. "Love Me to Pieces" (Melvin Endsley)
