= The Kitty Wells Family Gospel Sing =

Studio album by Kitty Wells
- Released: 1965
- Genre: Gospel music
- Label: Decca

Kitty Wells chronology
Lonesome and Sad Blue (1965)	The Kitty Wells Family Gospel Sing (1965)	Songs Made Famous By Jim Reeves (1966)

The Kitty Wells Family Gospel Sing is a gospel music album recorded by Kitty Wells and released in 1965 on the Decca label (DL 4679). Thom Owens of Allmusic called it "a good, but unremarkable, country gospel LP."

== Track listing ==
Side A

1. "Jesus Is Coming Soon" (Bill Phillips) [2:13]
2. "A Family Gathering at Home" (Roy Botkin) [2:05]
3. "Where the Soul of Man Never Dies" (Johnny Wright) [2:14]
4. "Let's Regain the Garden" (Herman Phillips) [2:56]
5. "Shake My Mother's Hand for Me" (Johnny Wright) [2:20]
6. "Heaven" (Don W. Mosher) [2:17]

Side B

1. "Glory Land March" (Johnnie Masters) [2:13]
2. "Precious Memories" (adapted and arranged by Johnny Wright) [2:46]
3. "I'm on My Way" (Bill Phillips) [2:12]
4. "Thank God for a Mother Like Mine" (Johnnie Bailes) [2:18]
5. "(With My Friends At) Old Country Church" (Johnny Wright) [1:50]
6. "There's No Greater Time Than Now" (Roy Botkin) [2:51]
