= Lonesome, Sad, and Blue =

Lonesome Sad and Blue

Studio album by Kitty Wells
- Released: 1965
- Genre: Country
- Label: Decca

Kitty Wells chronology
Burning Memories (1965)	Lonesome Sad and Blue (1965)	The Kitty Wells Family Gospel Sing (1965)

Lonesome Sad and Blue is an album recorded by Kitty Wells and released in 1965 on the Decca label (DL 4658) in the United States and on the Brunswick label (LAT 8621) in the United Kingdom. Thom Owens of Allmusic gave the album three stars and called it "a typically enjoyable set of country ballads and weepers."

== Track listing ==
Side A

1. "Oh, Lonesome Me" (Don Gibson) [2:37]
2. "A Thing Called Sadness" (Chuck Howard) [2:26]
3. "Blues Are Sittin' In" (Bill Phillips) [2:33]
4. "When Your Little High Horse Runs Down" (Roy Botkin) [2:14]
5. "You're the Only World I Know" (Bob Tubert, Sonny James) [2:35]
6. "Loving You Then Losing You" (Max Powell, Wayne P. Walker) [2:37]

Side B

1. "Leavin' Town Tonight" (Jim Anglin) [2:38]
2. "Dear Heart" (Henry Mancini, Jay Livingston, Ray Evans) [2:21]
3. "The Race Is On" (Don Rollins) [2:23]
4. "Welcome to My World" (John Hathcock, Ray Winkler) [2:20]
5. "Watch It Heart, Don't Fall" (Roy Botkin) [2:16]
6. "Cheatin' Is Catching" (Ira Louvin, Kitty Wells) [2:30]
