= Songs Made Famous by Jim Reeves =

Studio album by Kitty Wells
- Released: 1966
- Genre: Country
- Label: Decca

Kitty Wells chronology
The Kitty Wells Family Gospel Sing (1965)	Songs Made Famous by Jim Reeves (1966)	Country All the Way (1966)

Songs Made Famous by Jim Reeves is an album recorded by Kitty Wells and released in 1966 on the Decca label (DL 4741) in the United States and on the Brunswick label (STA 8646) in the United Kingdom. Thom Owens of Allmusic called it an enjoyable collection.

== Track listing ==
Side A

1. "Four Walls" (George Campbell, Marvin Moore) [3:04]
2. "Billy Bayou" (Roger Miller) [2:13]
3. "Is It Really Over?" (Jim Reeves) [2:03]
4. "I'm Gonna Change Everything" (Alex Zanetis) [1:52]
5. "I Won't Forget You" (Harlan Howard) [2:00]
6. "She'll Have to Go" (A. Allison, J. Allison) [2:25]

Side B

1. "Welcome to My World" (John Hathcock, Ray Winkler) [2:20]
2. "Bimbo" (Rodney Morris) [2:25]
3. "Am I Losing You?" (Jim Reeves) [2:35]
4. "According to My Heart" (Gary Walker) [2:15]
5. "Guilty" (Alex Zanetis) [3:00]
6. "This Is It" (Cindy Walker) [3:05]
