= Together Again (Kitty Wells and Red Foley album) =

Studio album by Kitty Wells, Red Foley
- Released: 1967
- Genre: Country
- Label: Decca

Kitty Wells chronology
Love Makes the World Go Around (1967)	Together Again (1967)	Queen of Honky Tonk Street (1967)

Together Again is an album of duets recorded by Kitty Wells and Red Foley that was released in 1967 on the Decca label (DL 4906). The album included three hit singles: hit singles "Happiness Means You", "Hello Number One", and "Living as Strangers".

Thom Owens of AllMusic called the album "a very entertaining reunion album."

== Track listing ==
Side A

1. "Hello Number One"
2. "Together Again"
3. "My Wall Came Tumblin' Down"
4. "We Need One More Chance"
5. "Loved and Wanted"
6. "Ashes of Love"

Side B

1. "Happiness Means You"
2. "Living as Strangers"
3. "Looking Over Our Shoulder"
4. "We Made a Mistake"
5. "Have I Told You Lately That I Love You?"
6. "My Happiness"
