= Queen of Honky Tonk Street =

Studio album by Kitty Wells
- Released: 1967
- Genre: Country
- Label: Decca

Kitty Wells chronology
Together Again (1967)	Queen of Honky Tonk Street (1967)	Showcase (1968)

Queen of Honky Tonk Street is an album recorded by Kitty Wells and released in 1967 on the Decca label (DL 4929) in the United States and on the Calendar Records label (SR66-9640) in Australia.

The album's title track, "Queen of Honky Tonk Street", was one of Wells' final hits, peaking at No. 28 on the Billboard country chart.

Thom Owens of AllMusic noted that Wells' "gutsy voice" made it worth hearing though the production was "a bit too heavy" for Wells' honky tonk inclinations.

== Track listing ==
Side A

1. "Queen of Honky Tonk Street" (Jim Anglin) [2:42]
2. "Walk Through This World with Me" (Kay Savage, Sandra Seamons) [2:16]
3. "If I Kiss You (Will You Go Away?)" (Liz Anderson) [2:16]
4. "Wasting My Time" (Jim Anglin) [2:38]
5. "Need You" (John Blackburn, Teepee Mitchell, Lewis Porter) [2:23]
6. "Just Beyond the Moon" (Jeremy Slate) [3:01]

Side B

1. "Cincinnati, Ohio" (Bill Anderson) [2:01]
2. "All the Time" (Mel Tillis, Wayne Walker) [2:18]
3. "I Can't Get There from Here" (Dallas Frazier) [2:14]
4. "It's Such a Pretty World Today" (Dale Noe) [2:31]
5. "Paper Mansions" (Ted Harris) [2:46]
6. "I'll Never Find Another You" (Tom Springfield) [2:16]
