= Winner of Your Heart =

Studio album by Kitty Wells
- Released: June 15, 1956
- Genre: Country
- Label: Decca

Kitty Wells chronology
Kitty Wells' Country Hit Parade (1956)	Winner of Your Heart (1956)	Lonely Street (1958)

Winner of Your Heart is an album recorded by Kitty Wells and released in 1956 on the Decca label (DL 8552).

In Billboard magazine's annual poll of country and western disc jockeys, Winner of Your Heart was ranked No. 5 among the "Favorite C&W Albums" of 1956.

The album's final track, "She's No Angel", charted for 11 weeks on the "Best Seller flip" chart.

In a 1957 review of the album, the syndicated country music critic Les Carroll wrote: "Kitty Wells' 'Winner of Your Heart' has 12 beautiful songs she never before recorded, done in her very appealing style."

Allmusic gave the album four stars.

== Track listing ==
Side A

1. "Each Day" (Benny Martin, Cindy Walker) - 2:07
2. "Dancing With a Stranger" (Cindy Walker) - 2:37
3. "A Mansion on the Hill" (Fred Rose, Hank Williams) - 2:30
4. "A Change of Heart" (Boudleaux Bryant, Felice Bryant) - 2:37
5. "Standing Room Only" (Bill Carlisle, Billy Wallace) - 2:19
6. "I Guess I'll Go On Dreaming" (Johnnie Bailes, Walter Bailes) - 2:24

Side B

1. "The Winner of Your Heart" (Johnnie Masters) - 2:00
2. "The Pace That Kills" (Harlan Howard) - 2:22
3. "Stubborn Heart" (Johnnie Masters) - 2:34
4. "Right Or Wrong" (John Skye, Sonny James) - 2:48
5. "Broken Marriage Vows" (duet with Ray Crisp) (Johnnie Bailes, Walter Bailes) - 2:16
6. "She's No Angel" (J. W. Arnold, Wanda Ballman) - 2:26
