= Country All the Way =

1966 studio album by Kitty Wells

Studio album by Kitty Wells
- Released: 1966
- Genre: Country
- Label: Decca

Kitty Wells chronology
Songs Made Famous by Jim Reeves (1966)	Country All the Way (1966)	The Kitty Wells Show (1966)

Country All the Way is an album recorded by Kitty Wells and released in 1966 on the Decca label (DL 4776) in the United States and on the Brunswick label (LAT 8659) in the United Kingdom.

The album included "Meanwhile, Down at Joe's", a song that peaked at No. 9 on the Billboard country chart. It was Wells' final top 10 hit.

The album opening track, "A Woman Half My Age", was also a hit, peaking at No. 15 on the Billboard country chart in February 1966.

Wells was accompanied on the album by the Jordanaires. Thom Owens of Allmusic called it a strong album with an excellent selection of songs.

== Track listing ==
Side one
No.	Title	Writer(s)	Length
1.	"A Woman Half My Age"	Virginia Kennedy	2:40
2.	"Crying Time"	Buck Owens	2:39
3.	"You're Driving Me Out of My Mind"	Gayle Smith	2:19
4.	"I Apologize"	Johnny Wright	2:21
5.	"Meanwhile, Down at Joe's"	Harlan Howard	2:37
6.	"Your Steppin' Stone"	Bozo Darnell, Major Luper	2:30

Side two
No.	Title	Writer(s)	Length
1.	"Nobody But a Fool (Would Love You)"	Bill Anderson	2:19
2.	"I Want to Go with You"	Hank Cochran	2:34
3.	"Once a Day"	Bill Anderson	2:30
4.	"A Woman Never Forgets"	Bill Phillips, Johnny Wright	2:32
5.	"Together Again"	Buck Owens	2:19
6.	"Too Many Rivers"	Harlan Howard	2:48
