= Showcase (Kitty Wells album) =

Studio album by Kitty Wells
- Released: 1968
- Genre: Country
- Label: Decca

Kitty Wells chronology
Queen of Honky Tonk Street (1967)	Showcase (1968)	We'll Stick Together (1968)

Showcase is an album recorded by Kitty Wells and released in 1968 on the Decca label (DL 4961). In the United Kingdom, it was released by MCA Records with the title My Big Truck Drivin' Man. The album's title track, "My Big Truck Drivin' Man", was Wells' final top 40 hit, peaking at No. 35 on the Billboard country chart.

== Track listing ==
Side A

1. "My Big Truck Drivin' Man" (Hank Mills) [2:25]
2. "If My Heart Had Windows" (Dallas Frazier) [2:18]
3. "This World Holds Nothing" [2:35]
4. "You Want Her Not Me" (Jim Anglin) [2:28]
5. "What Locks the Door" (Vic McAlpin) [2:05]
6. "Truck Driver's Sweetheart" (Jim Anglin) [2:15]

Side B

1. "Hangin' On" (Ira Allen, Billy Mize) [2:34]
2. "Burning a Hole in My Mind" (Cy Coben) [2:17]
3. "The Chokin' Kind" (Harlan Howard) [2:31]
4. "I Don't Wanna Play House" (Billy Sherrill, Glenn Sutton) [2:30]
5. "Kisses on Occasion" (Bill Phillips, Paul Yandell) [2:22]
