= German battleship Bismarck =

German battleship of World War II

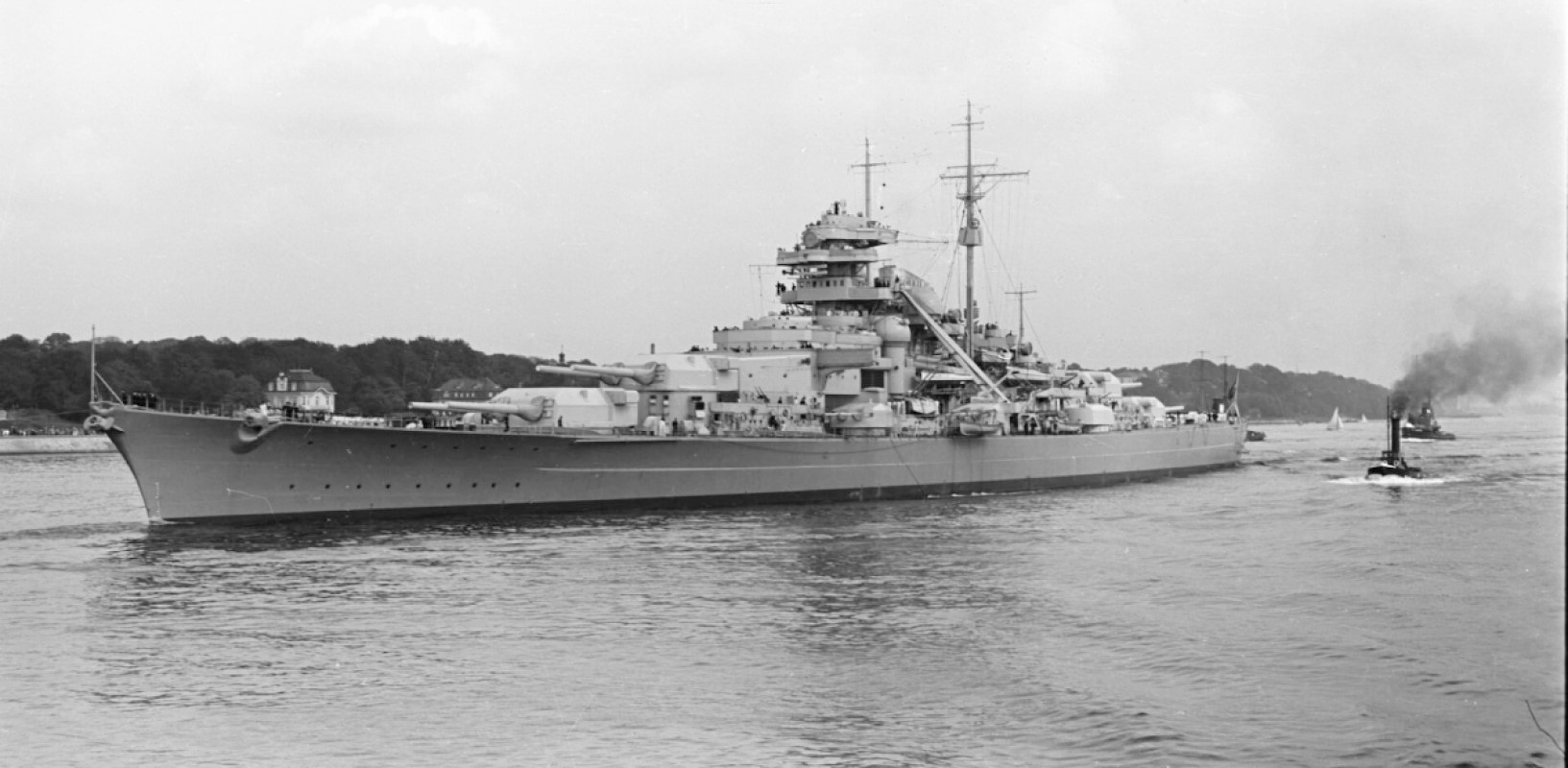
- Bismarck in 1940

History

Nazi Germany
- Name: Bismarck
- Namesake: Otto von Bismarck
- Builder: Blohm & Voss, Hamburg
- Laid down: 1 July 1936
- Launched: 14 February 1939
- Commissioned: 24 August 1940
- Fate: Scuttled following severe battle damage, 27 May 1941 in the North Atlantic; 48°10′N 16°12′W
- Badge

General characteristics
- Class & type: Bismarck-class battleship
- Displacement: 41,700 t (41,000 long tons) standard; 50,300 t (49,500 long tons) full load
- Length: 241.6 m (792 ft 8 in) waterline; 251 m (823 ft 6 in) overall
- Beam: 36 m (118 ft 1 in)
- Draft: 9.3 m (30 ft 6 in) standard (Note: Bismarck's draft at full load was 9.9 m (32 ft 6 in).)
- Installed power: 12 × Wagner superheated boilers; 148,116 shp (110,450 kW)
- Propulsion: 3 × geared turbines; 3 × screw propellers
- Speed: 30.01 knots (55.58 km/h; 34.53 mph) during trials (Note: One work claims a speed of 31.1 knots (57.6 km/h; 35.8 mph).)
- Range: 8,870 nmi (16,430 km; 10,210 mi) at 19 knots (35 km/h; 22 mph)
- Complement: 103 officers; 1,962 enlisted men
- Sensors & processing systems: FuMO 23 Seetakt radar; Hydrophone
- Armament: 8 × 38 cm (15 in) SK C/34 (4 × 2); 12 × 15 cm (5.9 in) SK C/28 (6 × 2); 16 × 10.5 cm (4.1 in) SK C/33 (8 × 2); 16 × 3.7 cm (1.5 in) SK C/30 (8 × 2); 12 × 2 cm (0.79 in) FlaK 30 (12 × 1)
- Armour: Belt: 320 mm (12.6 in); Turrets: 360 mm (14.2 in); Main deck: 100–120 mm (3.9–4.7 in)
- Aircraft carried: 4 × Arado Ar 196 floatplanes
- Aviation facilities: 1 double-ended catapult

Bismarck was the first of two Bismarck-class battleships built for Nazi Germany's Kriegsmarine. Named after Chancellor Otto von Bismarck, the ship was laid down at the Blohm & Voss shipyard in Hamburg in July 1936 and launched in February 1939. Work was completed in August 1940, when she was commissioned into the German fleet. Bismarck and her sister ship Tirpitz were the largest battleships ever built by Germany, and two of the largest built by any European power.

In the course of the warship's eight-month career, Bismarck conducted only one offensive operation that lasted eight days in May 1941, codenamed Rheinübung. The ship, along with the heavy cruiser Prinz Eugen, was to break into the Atlantic Ocean and raid Allied shipping from North America to Great Britain. The two ships were detected several times off Scandinavia, and British naval units were deployed to block their route. At the Battle of the Denmark Strait, the battlecruiser HMS Hood initially engaged Prinz Eugen, probably by mistake, while HMS Prince of Wales engaged Bismarck. In the ensuing battle Hood was destroyed by the combined fire of Bismarck and Prinz Eugen, which then damaged Prince of Wales and forced her retreat. Bismarck suffered sufficient damage from three hits by Prince of Wales to force an end to the raiding mission.

The destruction of Hood spurred a relentless pursuit by the Royal Navy involving dozens of warships. Two days later, heading for occupied France for repairs, Bismarck was attacked by fifteen Fairey Swordfish torpedo bombers from the aircraft carrier HMS Ark Royal; one scored a hit that rendered the battleship's steering gear inoperable. In her final battle the following morning, the already-crippled Bismarck was engaged by two British battleships and two heavy cruisers, and sustained incapacitating damage and heavy loss of life. The ship was scuttled to prevent her being boarded by the British, and to allow the ship to be abandoned so as to limit further casualties. Most experts agree that the battle damage would have caused her to sink eventually.

The wreck was located in June 1989 by Robert Ballard, and has since been further surveyed by several other expeditions.

== Design ==
The two Bismarck-class battleships were designed in the mid-1930s by the German Kriegsmarine as a counter to French naval expansion, specifically the two Richelieu-class battleships France had started in 1935. Laid down after the signing of the Anglo-German Naval Agreement of 1935, Bismarck and her sister Tirpitz were nominally within the 35,000-long-ton (36,000 t) limit imposed by the Washington Naval Treaty that governed battleship construction in the interwar period. The ships secretly exceeded the figure by a wide margin, though before either vessel was completed, the international treaty system had fallen apart following Japan's withdrawal in 1937, allowing signatories to invoke an "escalator clause" that permitted displacements as high as 45,000 long tons (46,000 t).

=== General characteristics ===
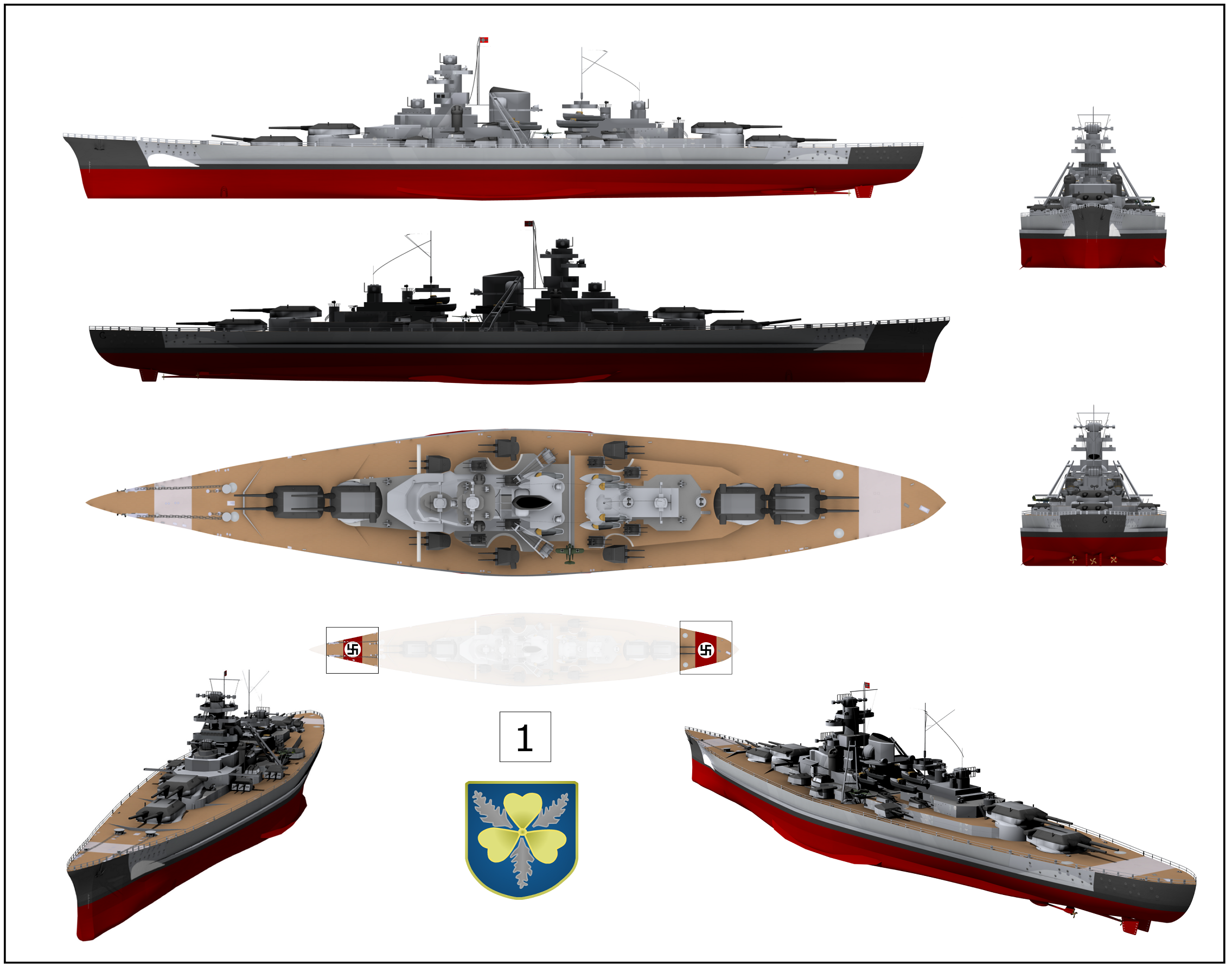
A 3D rendering of Bismarck based on her configuration during Operation Rheinübung

Bismarck displaced 41,700 t (41,000 long tons) as built and 50,300 t (49,500 long tons) fully loaded, with an overall length of 251 m (823 ft 6 in), a beam of 36 m (118 ft 1 in) and a maximum draft of 9.9 m (32 ft 6 in). The battleship was Germany's largest warship, and displaced more than any other European battleship, with the exception of HMS Vanguard, commissioned after the war. Bismarck's hull used 90 percent welded construction to save weight; it was divided into 22 watertight compartments and had a double bottom that ran for 83 percent of the ship's length.

Bismarck was powered by three Blohm & Voss geared steam turbines driving three 3-bladed screw propellers. Steam was provided by twelve oil-fired Wagner superheated boilers, which were vented through a single large funnel amidships. The propulsion system was rated to produce 138,000 metric horsepower (136,000 shp) for a top speed of 29 knots (54 km/h; 33 mph), but the ship significantly exceeded both figures on speed trials, reaching 150,170 metric horsepower (148,120 shp) for 30.01 knots (55.58 km/h; 34.53 mph). The ship stored 6,400 t (6,300 long tons; 7,100 short tons) of oil for the boilers, which gave her a cruising range of 8,870 nautical miles (16,430 km; 10,210 mi) at 19 knots (35 km/h; 22 mph).

The standard crew numbered 103 officers and 1,962 enlisted men. When Bismarck left port, fleet staff, prize crews, and war correspondents increased the crew complement to over 2,200 men. Roughly 600 of the crew came from the light cruiser Karlsruhe, which had been lost during Operation Weserübung, the German invasion of Norway. Bismarck's crew published a ship's newspaper titled Die Schiffsglocke (The Ship's Bell). Bismarck carried four Arado Ar 196 reconnaissance floatplanes in a double hangar amidships and two single hangars abreast the funnel, with a double-ended thwartship catapult.

=== Armament and armour ===
Bismarck was armed with a main battery of eight 38 cm (15 in) SK C/34 guns arranged in four twin gun turrets: two super-firing turrets forward—"Anton" and "Bruno"—and two aft—"Caesar" and "Dora". (Note: SK stands for Schiffskanone (ship's gun), C/34 stands for Construktionsjahr (design year) 1934, and L/52 denotes the Länge (length) of the gun in terms of calibres, meaning that the length of the gun barrel is 52 times greater than the calibre (internal diameter) of the gun barrel.) Secondary armament consisted of twelve 15 cm (5.9 in) L/55 guns. The main-battery and secondary guns were aimed from three fire-control director stations, using mechanical computers to plot target distances and courses and to calculate angles for the guns. On top of each fire-control station a rangefinder was mounted in a rotating cupola, a FuMO 23 Seetakt radar set was installed by March 1941 on the front of all three cupolas.

The heavy anti-aircraft armament consisted of sixteen 10.5 cm (4.1 in) C/33 guns in eight twin mountings. The forward two pairs of gun mountings were of the old C/31 type while the aft two pairs were of the newer C/37 type. The middle and light anti-aircraft armament consisted of sixteen 3.7 cm (1.5 in) C/30, and initially twelve 2 cm (0.79 in) C/30 anti-aircraft guns. In April 1941 two of the single 2 cm guns mounted on the searchlight platform on the foretop were replaced by two quadruple 2 cm C/38 guns. Anti-aircraft fire control for the 10.5 cm guns was provided by four stabilised SL-8 directors, though the 3.7 and 2 cm guns were only given portable rangefinders.

The ship's main belt was 320 mm (12.6 in) thick and was covered by a pair of upper and main armoured decks that were 50 mm (2 in) and 100 to 120 mm (3.9 to 4.7 in) thick, respectively. The 38 cm (15 in) turrets were protected by 360 mm (14.2 in) thick faces and 220 mm (8.7 in) thick sides.

== Service history ==
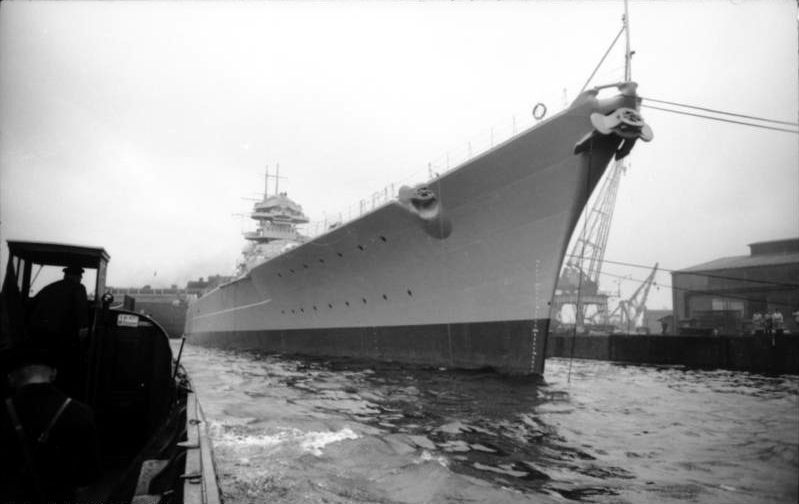
Bismarck in port in Hamburg

Bismarck was ordered under the name Ersatz Hannover ("Hannover replacement"), a replacement for the old pre-dreadnought SMS Hannover, under contract "F". The contract was awarded to the Blohm & Voss shipyard in Hamburg, where the keel was laid on 1 July 1936 at Helgen IX. The ship was launched on 14 February 1939 and during the elaborate ceremonies was christened by Dorothee von Löwenfeld, granddaughter of Chancellor Otto von Bismarck, the ship's namesake. Adolf Hitler made the christening speech. Fitting-out work followed the launch, during which time the original straight stem was replaced with a raked "Atlantic bow" similar to those of the Scharnhorst-class battleships. Bismarck was commissioned into the fleet on 24 August 1940 for sea trials, which were conducted in the Baltic. Kapitän zur See Ernst Lindemann took command of the ship at the time of commissioning.

On 15 September 1940, three weeks after commissioning, Bismarck left Hamburg to begin sea trials in Kiel Bay. Sperrbrecher 13 escorted the ship to Arcona on 28 September, and then on to Gotenhafen for trials in the Gulf of Danzig. The ship's power-plant was given a thorough workout; Bismarck made measured-mile and high speed runs. As the ship's stability and manoeuvrability were being tested, a flaw in her design was discovered. When attempting to steer the ship solely through altering propeller revolutions, the crew learned that Bismarck could be kept on course only with great difficulty. Even with the outboard screws running at full power in opposite directions, they generated only a slight turning ability. Bismarck's main battery guns were first test-fired in late November. The tests proved she was a very stable gun platform. Trials lasted until December; Bismarck returned to Hamburg, arriving on 9 December, for minor alterations and the completion of the fitting-out process.

The ship was scheduled to return to Kiel on 24 January 1941, but a merchant vessel had been sunk in the Kiel Canal and prevented use of the waterway. Severe weather hampered efforts to remove the wreck, and Bismarck was not able to reach Kiel until March. The delay greatly frustrated Lindemann, who remarked that "[Bismarck] had been tied down at Hamburg for five weeks ... the precious time at sea lost as a result cannot be made up, and a significant delay in the final war deployment of the ship thus is unavoidable." While waiting to reach Kiel, Bismarck hosted Captain Anders Forshell, the Swedish naval attaché to Berlin. He returned to Sweden with a detailed description of the ship, which was subsequently leaked to Britain by pro-British elements in the Swedish Navy. The information provided the Royal Navy with its first full description of the vessel, although it lacked important facts, including top speed, radius of action, and displacement.

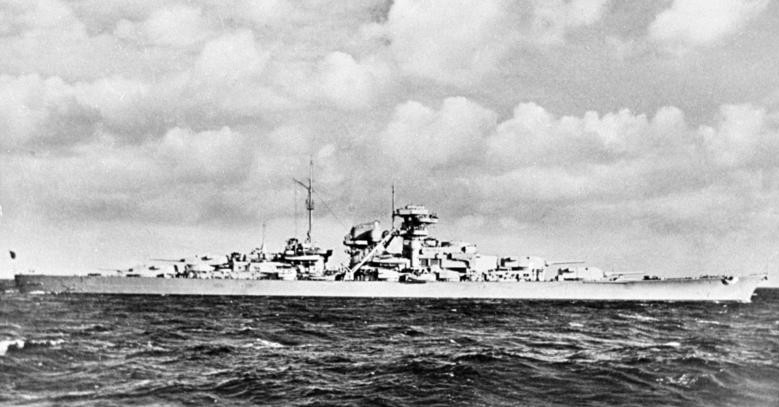
Bismarck on trials; the rangefinders had not yet been installed

On 6 March, Bismarck received the order to steam to Kiel. On the way, the ship was escorted by several Messerschmitt Bf 109 fighters and a pair of armed merchant vessels, along with an icebreaker. At 08:45 on 8 March, Bismarck briefly ran aground on the southern shore of the Kiel Canal; she was freed within an hour. The ship reached Kiel the following day, where her crew stocked ammunition, fuel, and other supplies and applied a coat of dazzle paint to camouflage her. British bombers attacked the harbour without success on 12 March. On 17 March, the old battleship Schlesien, now used as an icebreaker, escorted Bismarck through the ice to Gotenhafen, where the latter continued combat readiness training.

The Naval High Command (Oberkommando der Marine or OKM), commanded by Admiral Erich Raeder, intended to continue the practice of using heavy ships as surface raiders against Allied merchant traffic in the Atlantic Ocean. The two Scharnhorst-class battleships were based in Brest, France, at the time, having just completed Operation Berlin, a major raid into the Atlantic. Initial planning for the next major operation involved these two ships and the recently completed Bismarck, which was to sortie from the Baltic and rendezvous with the two Scharnhorst-class ships in the Atlantic. The operation was initially scheduled for around 26 April 1941, when a new moon period would make conditions more favourable.

Scharnhorst required a boiler overhaul following Operation Berlin; the workers discovered during the overhaul that the boilers were in worse condition than expected. She would also be unavailable for the planned sortie. Attacks by British bombers on supply depots in Kiel delayed repairs to the heavy cruisers Admiral Scheer and Admiral Hipper. The two ships would not be ready for action until July or August. The former was also too slow to keep up with Bismarck, and the latter had serious reliability problems, and were unsuitable in any event. Ultimately, it was decided that Bismarck and the heavy cruiser Prinz Eugen would sail together with the intention of meeting Gneisenau at sea. While preparations were underway, Gneisenau was torpedoed in Brest and damaged further by bombs when in drydock.

Admiral Günther Lütjens, Flottenchef (Fleet Chief) of the Kriegsmarine, chosen to lead the operation, wished to delay the operation at least until either Scharnhorst or Tirpitz became available, but the OKM decided to proceed with the operation, codenamed Operation Rheinübung, with a force consisting of only Bismarck and Prinz Eugen. At a final meeting with Raeder in Paris on 26 April, Lütjens was encouraged by his commander-in-chief to proceed and he eventually decided that an operation should begin as soon as possible to prevent the enemy gaining any respite.

=== Operation Rheinübung ===
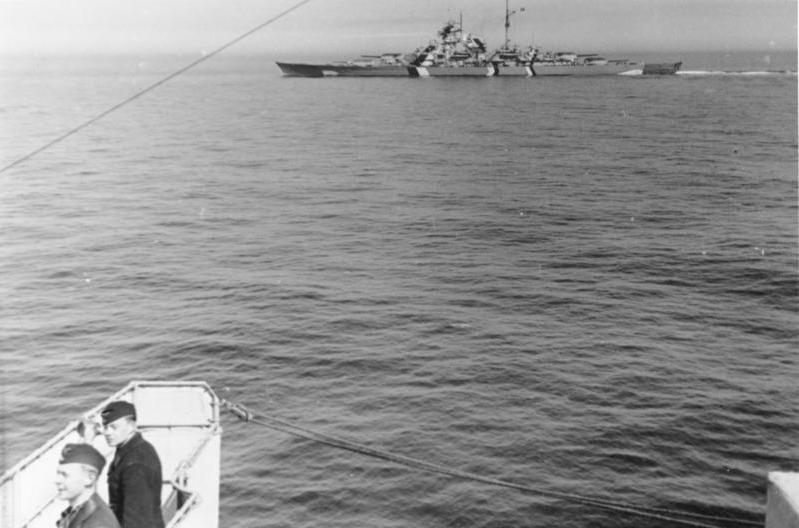
Bismarck, photographed from Prinz Eugen, in the Baltic at the outset of Operation Rheinübung

On 5 May 1941, Hitler and Wehrmacht High Command Chief Wilhelm Keitel, with a large entourage, arrived to view Bismarck in Gotenhafen. The men were given an extensive tour of the ship, after which Hitler met Lütjens to discuss the forthcoming mission. On 16 May, Lütjens reported that Bismarck and Prinz Eugen were fully prepared for Operation Rheinübung; he was therefore ordered to proceed with the mission on the evening of 19 May. As part of the operational plans, a group of eighteen supply ships would be positioned to support Bismarck and Prinz Eugen. Four U-boats would be placed along the convoy routes between Halifax and Britain to scout for the raiders.

By the start of the operation, Bismarck's crew had increased to 2,221 officers and enlisted men. This included an admiral's staff of nearly 65 and a prize crew of 80 sailors, who could be used to crew transports captured during the mission. At 02:00 on 19 May, Bismarck departed Gotenhafen and made for the Danish Straits. She was joined at 11:25 by Prinz Eugen, which had departed the previous night at 21:18, off Cape Arkona. The two ships were escorted by three destroyers—Z10 Hans Lody, Z16 Friedrich Eckoldt, and Z23—and a flotilla of minesweepers. The Luftwaffe provided air cover during the voyage out of German waters. At around noon on 20 May, Lindemann informed the ship's crew via loudspeaker of the ship's mission. At approximately the same time, a group of ten or twelve Swedish aircraft flying reconnaissance encountered the German force and reported its composition and heading, though the Germans did not see the Swedes.

An hour later, the German flotilla encountered the Swedish cruiser HSwMS Gotland; the cruiser shadowed the Germans for two hours in the Kattegat. Gotland transmitted a report to naval headquarters, stating: "Two large ships, three destroyers, five escort vessels, and 10–12 aircraft passed Marstrand, course 205°/20'." The OKM was not concerned about the security risk posed by Gotland, though both Lütjens and Lindemann believed operational secrecy had been lost. The report eventually made its way to Captain Henry Denham, the British naval attaché to Sweden, who transmitted the information to the Admiralty. The code-breakers at Bletchley Park confirmed that an Atlantic raid was imminent, as they had decrypted reports that Bismarck and Prinz Eugen had taken on prize crews and requested additional navigational charts from headquarters. A pair of Supermarine Spitfires was ordered to search the Norwegian coast for the flotilla.

German aerial reconnaissance confirmed that one aircraft carrier, three battleships, and four cruisers remained at anchor in the main British naval base at Scapa Flow, which persuaded Lütjens that the British were unaware of his operation. On the evening of 20 May, Bismarck and the rest of the flotilla reached the Norwegian coast; the minesweepers were detached and the two raiders and their destroyer escorts continued north. The following morning, radio-intercept officers on board Prinz Eugen picked up a signal ordering British reconnaissance aircraft to search for two battleships and three destroyers northbound off the Norwegian coast. At 7:00 on the 21st, the Germans spotted four unidentified aircraft, which quickly departed. Shortly after 12:00, the flotilla reached Bergen and anchored at Grimstadfjord, where the ships' crews painted over the Baltic camouflage with the standard "outboard grey" worn by German warships operating in the Atlantic. In addition, while the Germans cruised past Flekkefjord, members of the Norwegian resistance radioed observations of their movement to the British.

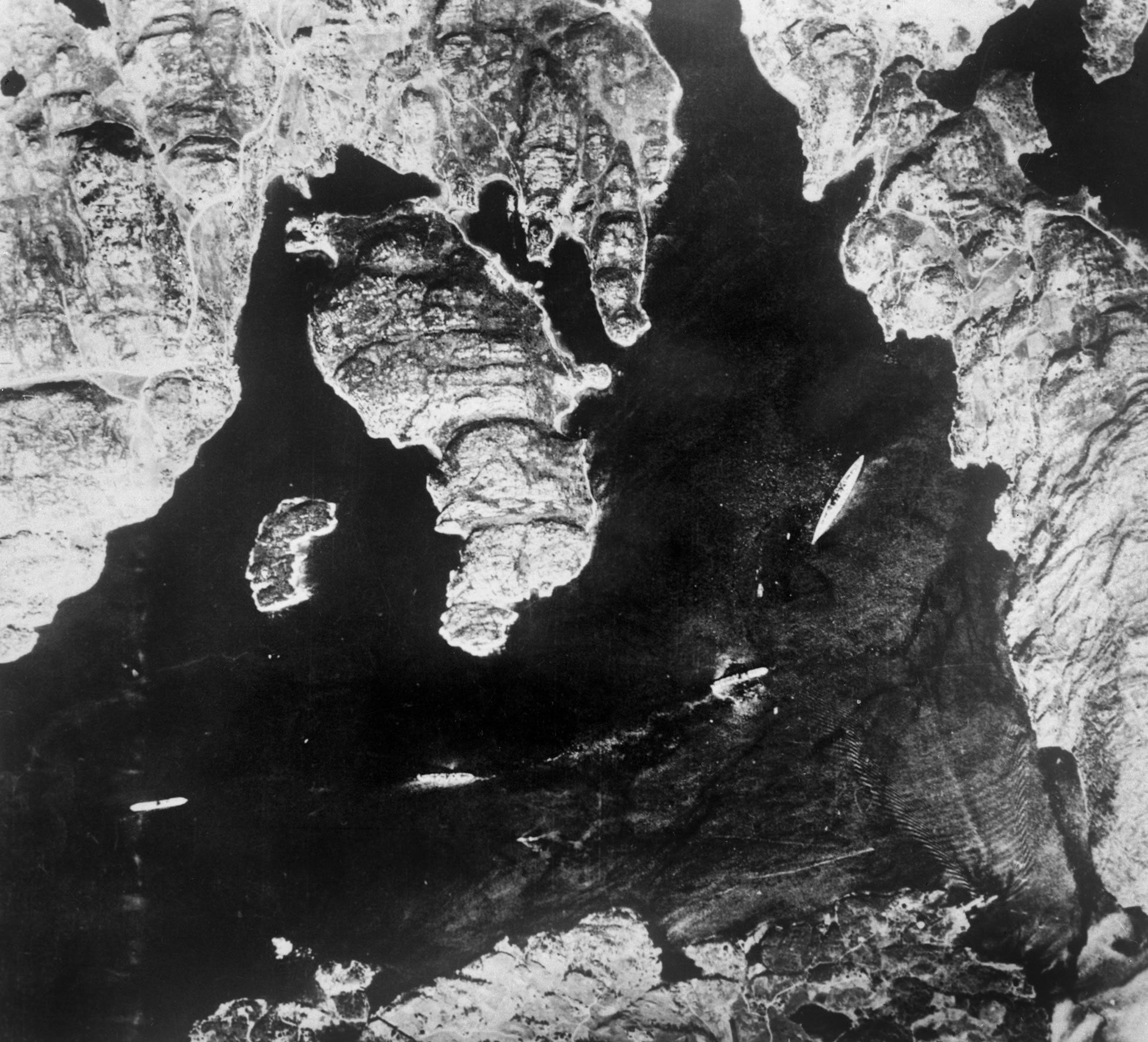
RAF aerial reconnaissance photo showing Bismarck anchored (centre right) in Grimstadfjord, Norway

When Bismarck was in Norway, a pair of Bf 109 fighters circled overhead to protect her from British air attacks, but Flying Officer Michael Suckling managed to fly his Spitfire directly over the German flotilla at a height of 8,000 m (26,000 ft) and take photos of Bismarck and her escorts. Upon receipt of the information, Admiral John Tovey ordered the battlecruiser HMS Hood, the newly commissioned battleship HMS Prince of Wales, and six destroyers to reinforce the pair of cruisers patrolling the Denmark Strait. The rest of the Home Fleet was placed on high alert in Scapa Flow. Eighteen bombers were dispatched to attack the Germans, but weather over the fjord had worsened and they were unable to find the German warships.

Bismarck did not replenish her fuel stores in Norway, as her operational orders did not require her to do so. She had left port 200 t (200 long tons) short of a full load, and had since expended another 1,000 t (980 long tons) on the voyage from Gotenhafen. Prinz Eugen took on 764 t (752 long tons) of fuel. At 19:30 on 21 May, Bismarck, Prinz Eugen, and the three escorting destroyers left Bergen. At midnight, when the force was in the open sea, heading towards the Arctic Ocean, Raeder disclosed the operation to Hitler, who reluctantly consented to the raid. The three escorting destroyers were detached at 04:14 on 22 May, while the force steamed off Trondheim. At around 12:00, Lütjens ordered his two ships to turn toward the Denmark Strait to attempt the break-out into the open Atlantic. The same bad weather that had encouraged Lütjens to start the break-out attempt, prevented any reconnaissance flights over Bergen. But at 16:00 a Martin Maryland managed to take off from RNAS Hatston and made it to Bergen where it could see the harbour was empty. On receiving the report, Tovey left Scapa Flow with the Home Fleet at 22:15.

By 04:00 on 23 May, Lütjens ordered Bismarck and Prinz Eugen to increase speed to 27 knots (50 km/h; 31 mph) to make the dash through the Denmark Strait. Upon entering the Strait, both ships activated their FuMO radar detection equipment sets. Bismarck led Prinz Eugen by about 700 m (770 yd); mist reduced visibility to 3,000–4,000 m (3,300–4,400 yd). The Germans encountered some ice at around 10:00, which necessitated a reduction in speed to 24 knots (44 km/h; 28 mph). Two hours later, the pair had reached a point north of Iceland. The ships were forced to zigzag to avoid ice floes. At 19:22, hydrophone and radar operators aboard the German warships detected the cruiser HMS Suffolk at a range of approximately 12,500 m (13,700 yd). Prinz Eugen's radio-intercept team decrypted the radio signals being sent by Suffolk and learned that their location had been reported.

Lütjens gave permission for Prinz Eugen to engage Suffolk, but the captain of the German cruiser could not clearly make out his target and so held fire. Suffolk quickly retreated to a safe distance and shadowed the German ships. At 20:30, the heavy cruiser HMS Norfolk joined Suffolk, but approached the German raiders too closely. Lütjens ordered his ships to engage the British cruiser; Bismarck fired five salvoes, three of which straddled Norfolk and rained shell splinters on her decks. The cruiser laid a smoke screen and fled into a fog bank, ending the brief engagement. The concussion from the 38 cm guns' firing disabled Bismarck's FuMO 23 radar set; this prompted Lütjens to order Prinz Eugen to take station ahead so she could use her functioning radar to scout for the formation.

At around 22:00, Lütjens ordered Bismarck to make a 180-degree turn in an effort to surprise the two heavy cruisers shadowing him. Although Bismarck was visually obscured in a rain squall, Suffolk's radar quickly detected the manoeuvre, allowing the cruiser to evade. The cruisers remained on station through the night, continually relaying the location and bearing of the German ships. The harsh weather broke on the morning of 24 May, revealing a clear sky. At 05:07, hydrophone operators aboard Prinz Eugen detected a pair of unidentified vessels approaching the German formation at a range of 20 nmi (37 km; 23 mi), reporting "Noise of two fast-moving turbine ships at 280° relative bearing!"

==== Battle of the Denmark Strait ====
At 05:45 on 24 May, German lookouts spotted smoke on the horizon; this turned out to be from Hood and Prince of Wales, under the command of Vice Admiral Lancelot Holland. Lütjens ordered his ships' crews to battle stations. By 05:52, the range had fallen to 26,000 m (28,000 yd) and Hood opened fire, followed by Prince of Wales a minute later. Hood engaged Prinz Eugen, which the British thought to be Bismarck, while Prince of Wales fired on Bismarck. (Note: The British were unaware that the German ships had reversed positions in the Denmark Strait. Observers on Prince of Wales correctly identified the ships but failed to inform Admiral Holland.) Adalbert Schneider, the first gunnery officer aboard Bismarck, twice requested permission to return fire, but Lütjens hesitated. Lindemann intervened, muttering "I will not let my ship be shot out from under my ass." He demanded permission to fire from Lütjens, who relented and at 05:55 ordered his ships to engage the British.

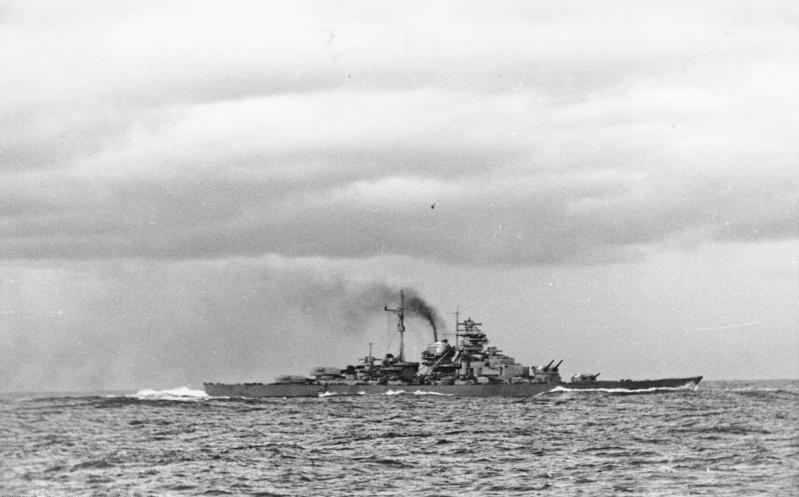
Bismarck as seen from Prinz Eugen after the Battle of the Denmark Strait

The British ships approached the German ships head on, which permitted them to use only their forward guns; Bismarck and Prinz Eugen could fire full broadsides. Several minutes after opening fire, Holland ordered a 20° turn to port, which would allow his ships to engage with their rear gun turrets. Both German ships concentrated their fire on Hood. About a minute after opening fire, Prinz Eugen scored a hit with a high-explosive 20.3 cm (8.0 in) shell; the explosion detonated unrotated projectile ammunition and started a large fire, which was quickly extinguished. After firing three four-gun salvoes, Schneider had found the range to Hood; he immediately ordered rapid-fire salvoes from Bismarck's eight 38 cm guns. He also ordered the ship's 15 cm secondary guns to engage Prince of Wales. Holland then ordered a second 20° turn to port, to bring his ships on a parallel course with Bismarck and Prinz Eugen. Lütjens ordered Prinz Eugen to shift fire and target Prince of Wales, to keep both of his opponents under fire. Within a few minutes, Prinz Eugen scored a pair of hits on the battleship that started a small fire.

Lütjens then ordered Prinz Eugen to drop behind Bismarck, so she could continue to monitor the location of Norfolk and Suffolk, which were still 10 to 12 nmi (19 to 22 km; 12 to 14 mi) to the east. At 06:00, Hood was completing the second turn to port when Bismarck's fifth salvo hit. Two of the shells landed short, striking the water close to the ship, but at least one of the 38 cm armour-piercing shells struck Hood and penetrated her thin deck armour. The shell reached Hood's rear ammunition magazine and detonated 112 t (110 long tons) of cordite propellant. The massive explosion broke the back of the ship between the main mast and the rear funnel; the forward section continued to move forward briefly before the in-rushing water caused the bow to rise into the air at a steep angle. The stern also rose as water rushed into the ripped-open compartments. Schneider exclaimed "He is sinking!" over the ship's loudspeakers. In only eight minutes of firing, Hood had disappeared, taking all but three of her crew of 1,419 men with her.

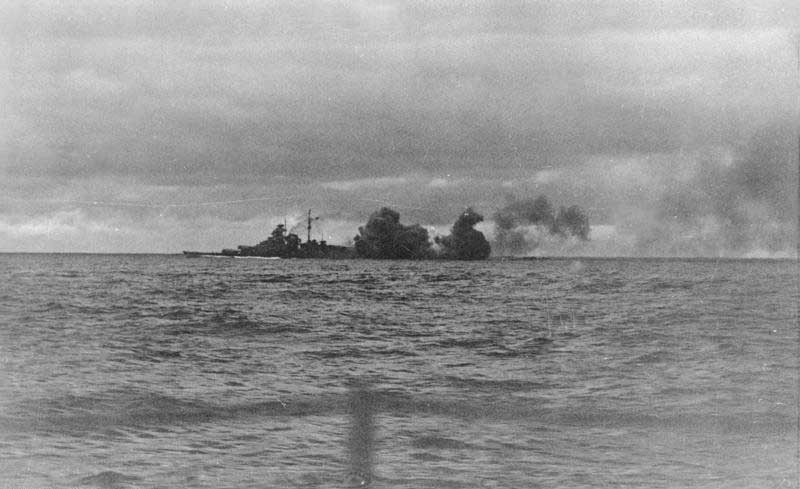
Bismarck firing her main battery during the battle

Bismarck then shifted fire to Prince of Wales. The British battleship scored a hit on Bismarck with her sixth salvo, but the German ship found her mark with her first salvo. One of the shells struck the bridge on Prince of Wales, though it did not explode and instead exited the other side, killing everyone in the ship's command centre, save Captain John Leach, the ship's commanding officer, and one other. The two German ships continued to fire upon Prince of Wales, causing serious damage. Guns malfunctioned on the recently commissioned British ship, which still had civilian technicians aboard. Despite the technical faults in the main battery, Prince of Wales scored three hits on Bismarck in the engagement. The first struck her in the forecastle above the waterline but low enough to allow the crashing waves to enter the hull. The second shell struck below the armoured belt and exploded on contact with the torpedo bulkhead, completely flooding a turbo-generator room and partially flooding an adjacent boiler room. The third shell passed through one of the boats carried aboard the ship and then went through the floatplane catapult without exploding.

At 06:13, Leach gave the order to retreat; only five of his ship's ten 14 in (356 mm) guns were still firing and his ship had sustained significant damage. Prince of Wales made a 160° turn and laid a smoke screen to cover her withdrawal. The Germans ceased fire as the range widened. Though Lindemann strongly advocated chasing Prince of Wales and destroying her, Lütjens obeyed operational orders to shun any avoidable engagement with enemy forces that were not protecting a convoy, firmly rejecting the request, and instead ordered Bismarck and Prinz Eugen to head for the North Atlantic. In the engagement, Bismarck had fired 93 armour-piercing shells and had been hit by three shells in return. The forecastle hit allowed 1,000 to 2,000 t (980 to 1,970 long tons) of water to flood into the ship, which contaminated fuel oil stored in the bow. Lütjens refused to reduce speed to allow damage control teams to repair the shell hole which widened and allowed more water into the ship. The second hit caused some additional flooding. Shell-splinters from the second hit also damaged a steam line in the turbo-generator room, but this was not serious, as Bismarck had sufficient other generator reserves. The combined flooding from these two hits caused a 9-degree list to port and a 3-degree trim by the bow.

While Prince of Wales was retreating, the hydrophone operators on Prinz Eugen detected torpedoes. It was unlikely that torpedoes were actually fired but both German ships took evasive manoeuvres. At the same time a shadowing Short Sunderland flying boat from No. 201 Squadron RAF approached too closely and the German heavy anti-aircraft artillery fired on it. A Lockheed Hudson from No. 269 Squadron RAF witnessed the battle from a distance and remained in touch until 08:08. After the battle, the Sunderland reported the oil slick and guided the destroyer Electra to the site where Hood had blown up. The destroyer found only three survivors.

==== Chase ====
Course of Bismarck and the ships that pursued her

After the engagement, Lütjens reported, "Battlecruiser, probably Hood, sunk. Another battleship, King George V or Renown, turned away damaged. Two heavy cruisers maintain contact." At 08:01, he transmitted a damage report and his intentions to OKM, which were to detach Prinz Eugen for commerce raiding and to make for Saint-Nazaire for repairs. Shortly after 10:00, Lütjens ordered Prinz Eugen to fall behind Bismarck to determine the severity of the oil leakage from the bow hit. After confirming "broad streams of oil on both sides of [Bismarck's] wake", Prinz Eugen returned to the forward position. About an hour later, the shadowing Sunderland reported the oil slick to Suffolk and Norfolk, which had been joined by the damaged Prince of Wales. Rear Admiral Frederic Wake-Walker, the commander of the two cruisers, ordered Prince of Wales to remain behind his ships.

When Dönitz offered the assistance of all Atlantic U-boats, Lütjens requested to set up a patrol line on the extrapolated route of Bismarck into the open Atlantic. Five U-boats—U-43, U-46, U-66, U-94, and U-557 were ordered to take up positions south of Greenland where they were expected to make contact in the morning of 25 May. Since Lütjens had intentions to make for a French port, a second group of U-boats consisting of U-48, U-74, U-97, U-98, and U-556 was stationed in the Bay of Biscay. Three other U-boats—U-73, U-93, and U-111—were rushing to reinforce the trap. U-108 and U-552 were ordered to sail from port to reinforce the Biscay group.

Prime Minister Winston Churchill ordered all warships in the area to join the pursuit of Bismarck and Prinz Eugen. Tovey's Home Fleet was steaming to intercept the German raiders, but on the morning of 24 May was still over 350 nmi (650 km; 400 mi) away. The Admiralty ordered the light cruisers Manchester, Birmingham, and Arethusa to patrol the Denmark Strait in case Lütjens attempted to retrace his route. The battleship Rodney, which had been escorting RMS Britannic and was due for a refit in the Boston Navy Yard, joined Tovey. Two old Revenge-class battleships were ordered into the hunt: Revenge, from Halifax, and Ramillies, which was escorting Convoy HX 127. In all, six battleships and battlecruisers, two aircraft carriers, thirteen cruisers, and twenty-one destroyers were committed to the chase. By around 17:00, the crew aboard Prince of Wales restored nine of her ten main guns to working order, which permitted Wake-Walker to place her in the front of his formation to attack Bismarck if the opportunity arose.

With the weather worsening, Lütjens attempted to detach Prinz Eugen at 16:40. The squall was not heavy enough to cover her withdrawal from Wake-Walker's cruisers, which continued to maintain radar contact. Prinz Eugen was therefore recalled temporarily. The cruiser was successfully detached at 18:14. Bismarck turned around to face Wake-Walker's formation, forcing Suffolk to turn away at high speed. Prince of Wales fired twelve salvos at Bismarck, which responded with nine salvos, none of which hit. The action diverted British attention and permitted Prinz Eugen to slip away. After Bismarck resumed her previous heading, Wake-Walker's three ships took up station on Bismarck's port side.

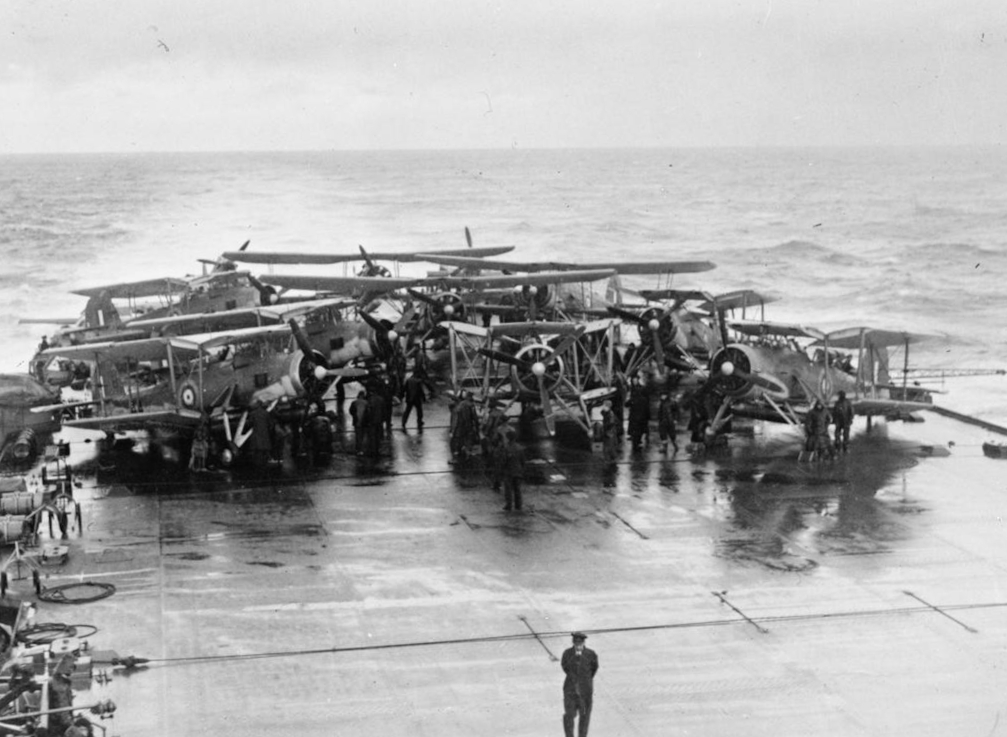
The Swordfish torpedo bombers of the strike force being prepared on the deck of HMS Victorious

Although Bismarck had been damaged in the engagement with Hood and forced to reduce speed, she was still capable of reaching 27 to 28 knots (50 to 52 km/h; 31 to 32 mph), the maximum speed of Tovey's King George V. Unless Bismarck could be slowed, the British would be unable to prevent her from reaching Saint-Nazaire. Shortly before 16:00 on 25 May, Tovey detached the aircraft carrier Victorious and four light cruisers to shape a course that would position her to launch her torpedo bombers. At 22:00, Victorious launched the strike, which comprised nine Fairey Swordfish torpedo bombers of 825 Naval Air Squadron, led by Lt Cdr Eugene Esmonde. The inexperienced aviators nearly attacked Norfolk and the U.S. Coast Guard cutter USCGC Modoc on their approach; the confusion alerted Bismarck's anti-aircraft gunners.

Bismarck also used her main and secondary batteries to fire at maximum depression to create giant splashes in the paths of the incoming torpedo bombers. None of the attacking aircraft were shot down. One of the Swordfish lost its way in the cloud and failed to attack. Bismarck evaded seven of the torpedoes launched at her, but the eighth struck amidships on the main armoured belt, throwing one man into a bulkhead and killing him and injuring five others. The explosion also caused minor damage to electrical equipment. The ship suffered more serious damage from manoeuvres to evade the torpedoes: rapid shifts in speed and course loosened collision mats, which increased the flooding from the forward shell hole and eventually forced abandonment of the port number 2 boiler room. This loss of a second boiler, combined with fuel losses and increasing bow trim, forced the ship to slow to 16 knots (30 km/h; 18 mph). Divers repaired the collision mats in the bow, after which speed increased to 20 knots (37 km/h; 23 mph), the speed that the command staff determined was the most economical for the voyage to occupied France.

Shortly after the Swordfish departed from the scene, Bismarck and Prince of Wales engaged in a brief artillery duel. Neither scored a hit. Bismarck's damage control teams resumed work after the short engagement. The sea water that had flooded the number 2 port side boiler threatened to enter the number 4 turbo-generator feedwater system, which would have permitted saltwater to reach the turbines. The saltwater would have damaged the turbine blades and thus greatly reduced the ship's speed. By morning on 25 May, the danger had passed. The ship slowed to 12 knots (22 km/h; 14 mph) to allow divers to pump fuel from the forward compartments to the rear tanks; two hoses were successfully connected and a few hundred tons of fuel were transferred.

As the chase entered open waters, Wake-Walker's ships were compelled to zig-zag to avoid German U-boats that might be in the area. This required the ships to steam for ten minutes to port, then ten minutes to starboard, to keep the ships on the same base course. For the last few minutes of the turn to port, Bismarck was out of range of Suffolk's radar. At 03:00 on 25 May, Lütjens decided to abandon the plan to lure the pursuers to the U-boat trap and to head directly for France. He ordered an increase to maximum speed, which at this point was 28 knots (52 km/h; 32 mph). He then ordered the ship to circle away to the west and then north. This manoeuvre coincided with the period during which his ship was out of radar range; Bismarck successfully broke radar contact and circled back behind her pursuers. Suffolk's captain assumed that Bismarck had broken off to the west and attempted to find her by also steaming west. After half an hour, he informed Wake-Walker, who ordered the three ships to disperse at daylight to search visually.

The Royal Navy search widened, despite the fact that many of the British ships were low on fuel. Victorious and her escorting cruisers were sent west, Wake-Walker's ships continued to the south and west, and Tovey continued to steam toward the mid-Atlantic. Force H, with the aircraft carrier Ark Royal and steaming up from Gibraltar, was still at least a day away. Unaware that he had shaken off Wake-Walker, Lütjens sent long radio messages to Naval Group West headquarters in Paris. The signals were intercepted by the British, from which bearings were determined. They were wrongly plotted on board King George V, leading Tovey to believe that Bismarck was heading back to Germany through the Iceland-Faeroe gap, which kept his fleet on the wrong course for seven hours. By the time the mistake had been discovered, Bismarck had put a sizeable gap between herself and the British ships.

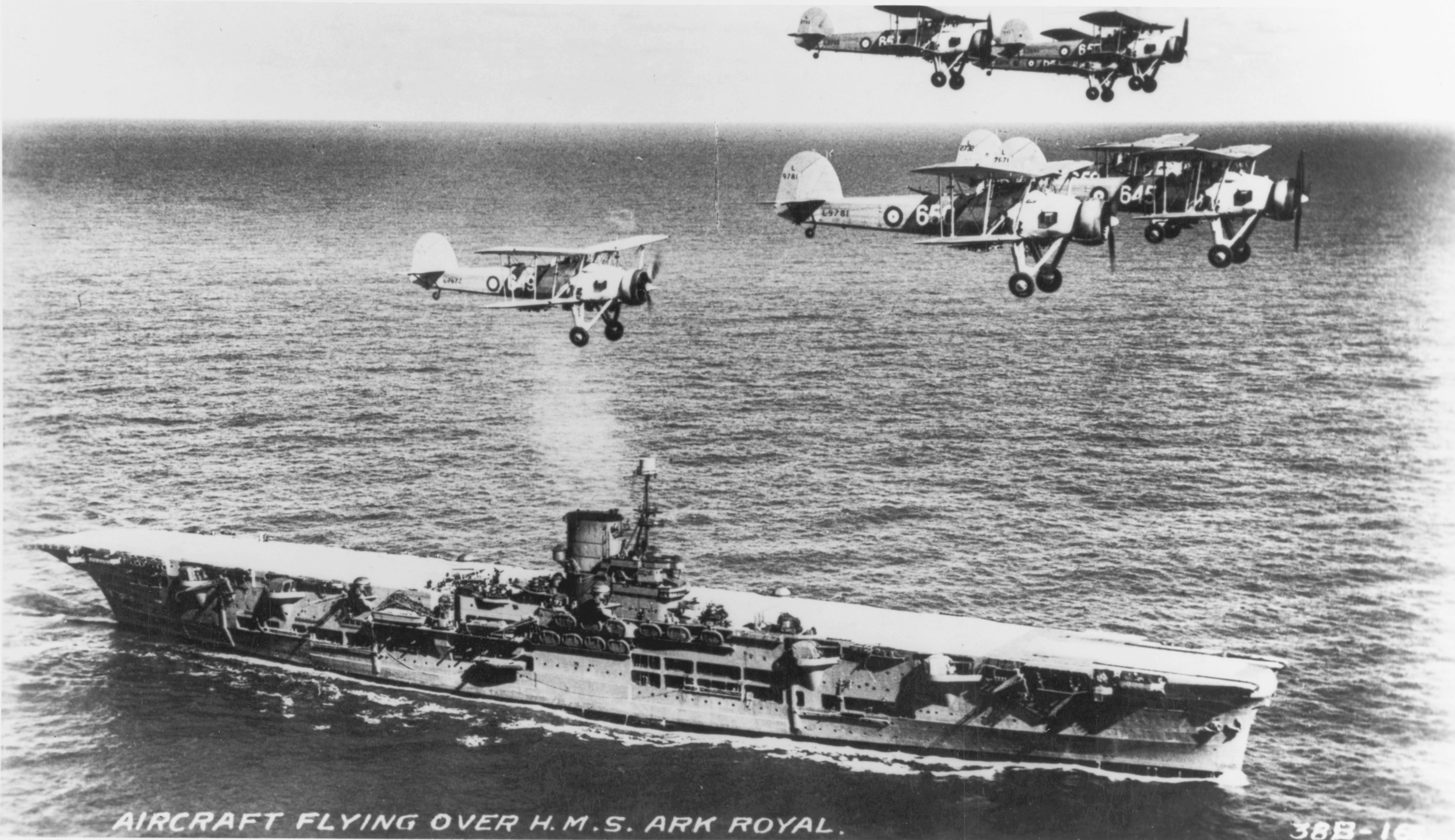
The aircraft carrier HMS Ark Royal with a flight of Swordfish overhead

British code-breakers were able to decrypt some of the German signals, including an order to the Luftwaffe to provide support for Bismarck making for Brest, decrypted by Jane Fawcett on 25 May 1941. The French Resistance provided the British with confirmation that Luftwaffe units were relocating there. Tovey could now turn his forces toward France to converge in areas through which Bismarck would have to pass. Two Consolidated Catalina flying boats from No. 209 Squadron RAF and No. 240 Squadron RAF based out of RAF Castle Archdale in Northern Ireland joined the search, covering areas where Bismarck might head in the attempt to reach occupied France. At 10:30 on 26 May, a Catalina piloted by British Flying Officer Dennis Briggs and co-piloted by Ensign Leonard B. Smith of the US Navy located her, some 690 nmi (1,280 km; 790 mi) northwest of Brest. (Note: Smith was one of nine American officers assigned to the RAF as special observers.) At her current speed, she would have been close enough to reach the protection of U-boats and the Luftwaffe in less than a day. Most British forces were not close enough to stop her.

The only possibility for the Royal Navy was Ark Royal with Force H, under the command of Admiral James Somerville. Victorious, Prince of Wales, Suffolk and Repulse were forced to break off the search due to fuel shortage; the only heavy ships remaining apart from Force H were King George V and Rodney, but they were too distant. Ark Royal's Swordfish were already searching nearby when the Catalina found her. Several torpedo bombers also located the battleship, about 60 nmi (110 km; 69 mi) away from Ark Royal. Somerville ordered an attack as soon as the Swordfish returned and were rearmed with torpedoes. He detached the cruiser Sheffield to shadow Bismarck, though Ark Royal's aviators were not informed of this. As a result, the Swordfish, which were armed with torpedoes equipped with magnetic detonators, accidentally attacked Sheffield. The magnetic detonators failed to work properly and Sheffield emerged unscathed. (Note: The Duplex pistol could be triggered either by impact or magnetic influence. It was used in the highly successful attack on the Italian fleet at the harbour of Taranto. The pistol worked well in calm waters only.)

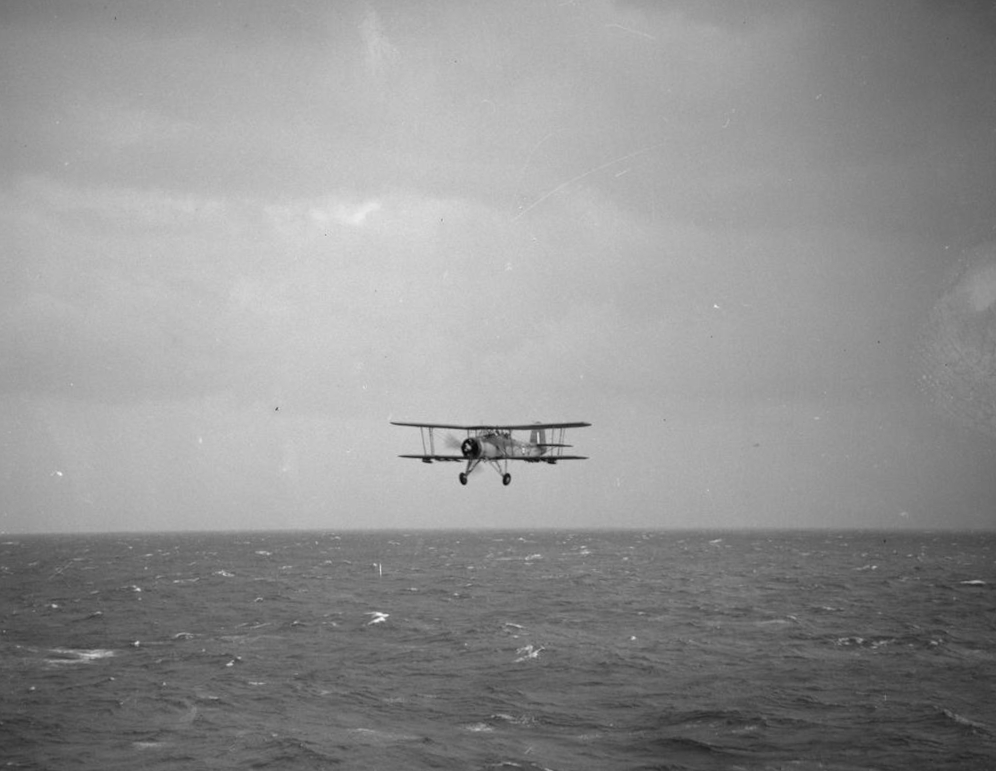
A Swordfish returns to Ark Royal after making the torpedo attack against Bismarck

Upon returning to Ark Royal, the Swordfish loaded torpedoes equipped with contact detonators. The second attack comprised fifteen aircraft and was launched at 19:10. At 19:50, Ark Royal and Renown passed the position of U-556. The U-boat was in an ideal shooting position, but had expended all torpedoes on previous operations and could not launch an attack. Before attacking, the Swordfish made first contact at 20:00 with Sheffield, which gave them a direction to Bismarck. They could not however find the German ship and at 20:30 asked again for direction from Sheffield. Finally at 20:47, the torpedo bombers began their attack descent through the clouds. As the Swordfish approached, Bismarck again fired her main battery at the aircraft, trying to catch planes in splash columns. The Swordfish then attacked; Bismarck began to turn violently as her anti-aircraft batteries engaged the bombers. One torpedo hit amidships on the port side, just below the bottom edge of the main armour belt. The force of the explosion was largely contained by the underwater protection system and the belt armour but some structural damage caused minor flooding.

The second torpedo struck Bismarck in her stern on the port side, near the port rudder shaft. The coupling on the port rudder assembly was badly damaged and the rudder became locked in a 12° turn to port. The explosion also caused much shock damage. The crew eventually managed to repair the starboard rudder but the port rudder remained jammed. A suggestion to sever the port rudder with explosives was dismissed by Lütjens, as damage to the screws would have left the battleship helpless. At 21:15, Lütjens reported that the ship was unmanoeuvrable.

==== Sinking ====
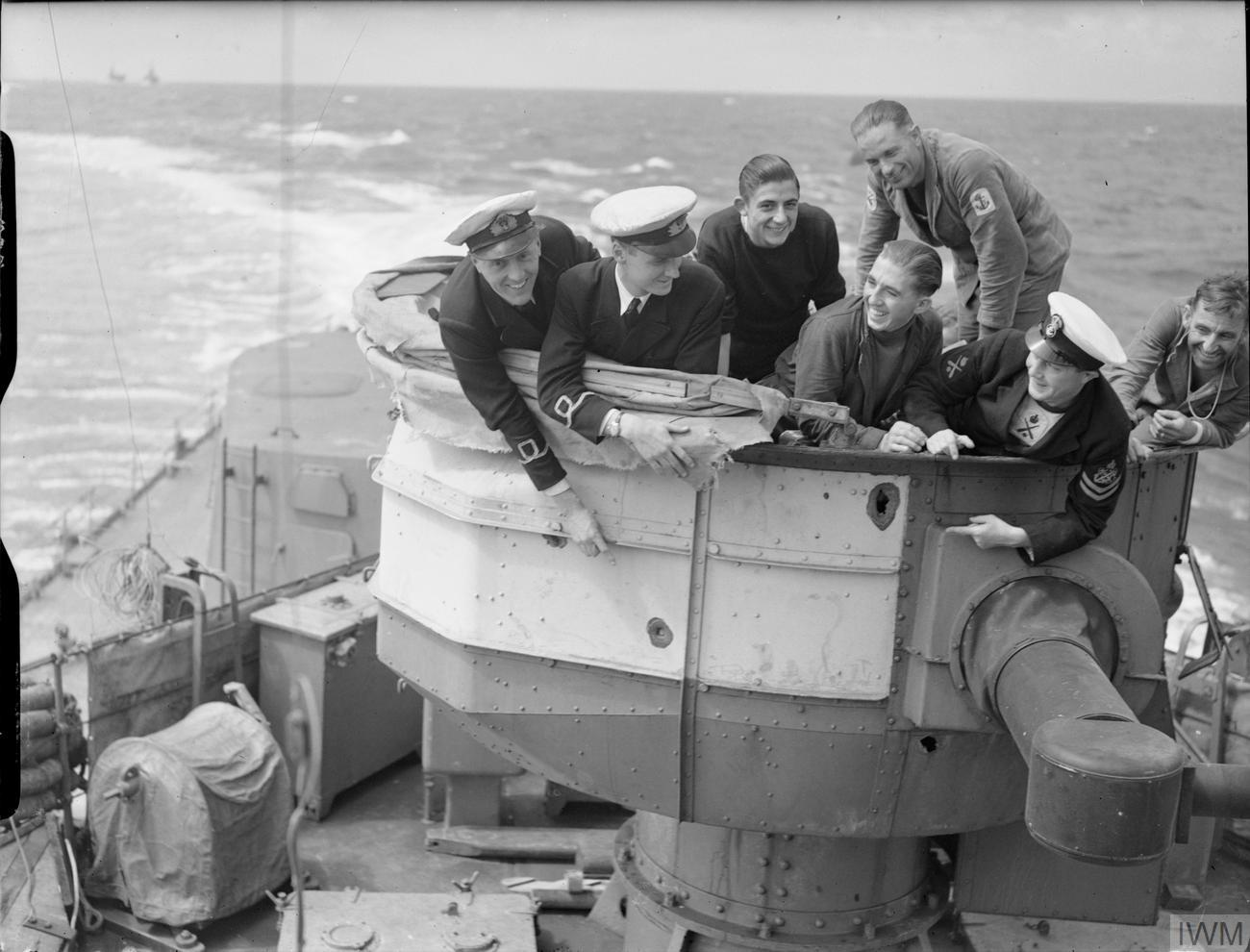
Splinter damage on the rear director tower of Sheffield caused by a near miss of the Bismarck.

With the port rudder jammed, Bismarck was now steaming in a large circle, unable to escape from Tovey's forces. Though fuel shortages had reduced the number of ships available to the British, the battleships King George V and Rodney were still available, along with the heavy cruisers Dorsetshire and Norfolk. Lütjens signalled headquarters at 21:40 on the 26th: "Ship unmanoeuvrable. We will fight to the last shell. Long live the Führer." The mood of the crew became increasingly depressed, especially as messages from the naval command reached the ship. Intended to boost morale, the messages only highlighted the desperate situation in which the crew found itself. As the Swordfish returned to the carrier, Bismarck briefly fired her main battery at the shadowing Sheffield. The first salvo went a mile astray, but the second salvo straddled the cruiser. Shell splinters rained down on Sheffield, killing three men and wounding two others. Four more salvoes were fired but no hits were scored. Sheffield quickly retreated under cover of a smoke screen. Sheffield lost contact in the low visibility and Captain Philip Vian's group of five destroyers was ordered to keep contact with Bismarck through the night.

These destroyers encountered Bismarck at 22:38; the battleship quickly engaged them with her main battery. After firing three salvos, she straddled the Polish destroyer ORP Piorun. The destroyer continued to close the range until a near miss at around 12,000 m (39,000 ft) forced her to turn away. Throughout the night and into the morning, Vian's destroyers harried Bismarck, illuminating her with star shells and firing sixteen torpedoes in nine separate attacks, none of which hit. Between 05:00 and 06:00, Bismarck's crew attempted to launch one of the Arado 196 float planes to carry away the ship's war diary, footage of the engagement with Hood, and other important documents. The third shell hit from Prince of Wales had damaged the steam line on the aircraft catapult, rendering it inoperative. As it was not possible to launch the aircraft, it had become a fire hazard, and was pushed overboard. Lütjens then asked at 07:10 if a U-boat could rendezvous with Bismarck to fetch these documents. U-556 was assigned at once to this task, but the U-boat missed the signalled order because it was submerged. U-556 was anyway too low on fuel to be able to carry out the order.

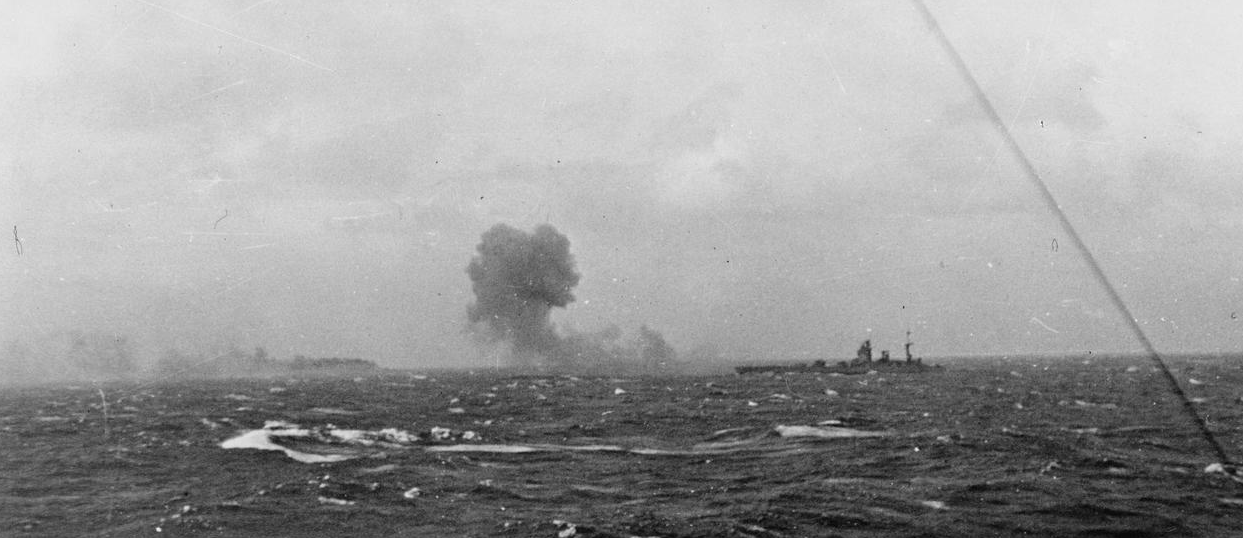
Rodney firing on Bismarck, which can be seen burning in the distance

After daybreak on 27 May, King George V led the attack. Rodney followed off her port quarter; Tovey intended to steam directly at Bismarck until he was about 8 nmi (15 km; 9.2 mi) away. At that point, he would turn south to put his ships parallel to his target. At 08:43, lookouts on King George V spotted her, some 23,000 m (25,000 yd) away. Four minutes later, Rodney's two forward turrets, comprising six 16 in (406 mm) guns, opened fire, then King George V's 14 in (356 mm) guns began firing. Bismarck returned fire at 08:50 with her forward guns; with her second salvo, she straddled Rodney. Thereafter, Bismarck's ability to aim her guns deteriorated as the ship, unable to steer, moved erratically in the heavy seas and deprived Schneider of a predictable course for range calculations.

As the range fell, the ships' secondary batteries joined the battle. Norfolk and Dorsetshire closed and began firing with their 8 in (203 mm) guns. At 09:02, a 16-inch shell from Rodney struck Bismarck's forward superstructure, killing hundreds of men and severely damaging the two forward turrets. According to survivors, this salvo probably killed both Lindemann and Lütjens and the rest of the bridge staff, although other survivors stated that they saw Lindemann on the deck as the ship sank. The main fire control director was also destroyed by this hit, which probably also killed Schneider. A second shell from this salvo struck the forward main battery, which was disabled, though it fired one last salvo at 09:27. Lieutenant Commander Müllenheim-Rechberg, in the rear control station, took over firing control for the rear turrets. He managed to fire three salvos before a shell destroyed the gun director, disabling his equipment. He gave the order for the guns to fire independently, but by 09:31, all four main battery turrets had been put out of action. One of Bismarck's shells exploded 20 feet off Rodney's bow and damaged her starboard torpedo tube—the closest Bismarck came to a direct hit on her opponents. At 09:10 Rodney launched six of her 24.5 in (620 mm) torpedoes from a distance of 10 km (6.2 mi) and Norfolk launched four from 15 km (9.3 mi). All torpedoes missed.

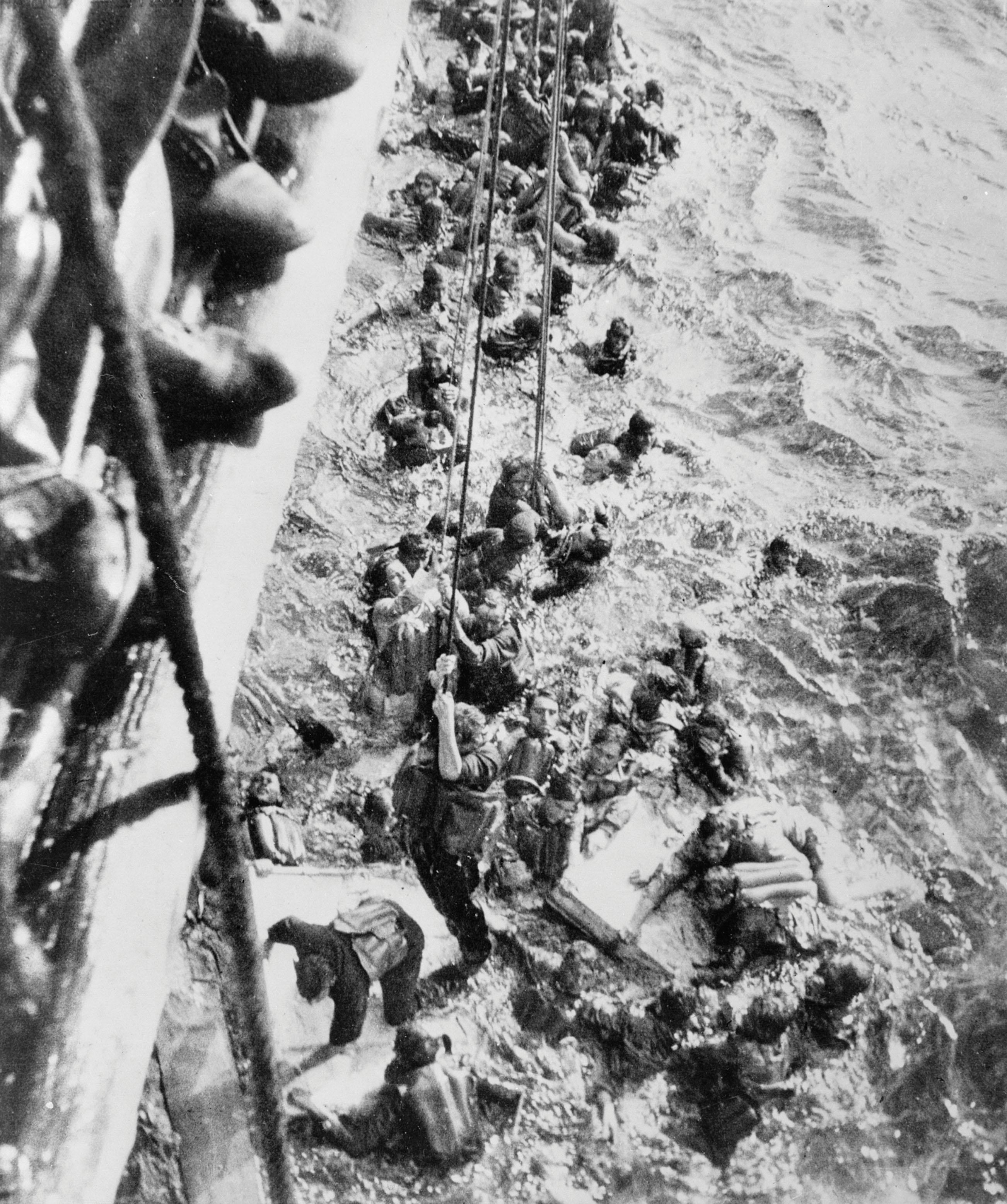
HMS Dorsetshire picking up survivors

With the bridge personnel no longer responding, the executive officer Fregattenkapitän Hans Oels took command of the ship from his station at the Damage Control Central. Some near misses alongside the port side, and the fact that the ship was no longer able to fight back, caused Oels to decide at around 09:30 to scuttle Bismarck to prevent the ship being boarded by the British, and to allow the crew to abandon ship so as to reduce casualties. Bismarck was also slowly sinking due to an increasing list that allowed water to enter the ship via damage to the main deck, leading to significant free surface effects, although the ship's very large metacentric height kept her afloat. At around 09:30 Oels ordered the men below decks to abandon ship; he instructed the engine room crews to open the ship's watertight doors and to prepare scuttling charges. The order to prepare to scuttle meant that watertight hatches between decks would be left open, ensuring that water that entered the battery deck via shell damage would start to penetrate below the battery deck, significantly increasing the list and eventually causing Bismarck to capsize.

Gerhard Junack, the chief engineering officer, ordered his men to set the demolition charges with a 9-minute fuse but the intercom system broke down and he sent a messenger to confirm the order to scuttle the ship. The messenger never returned, so Junack primed the charges and ordered his men to abandon ship. They left the engine spaces at around 10:10. Junack and his comrades heard the demolition charges detonate as they made their way up through the various levels. Oels rushed throughout the ship, ordering men to abandon their posts. At around 10:05 to 10:10, a 14-inch shell from King George V penetrated the upper citadel belt and exploded in the ship's aft canteen, killing Oels on the gun deck and about a hundred others.

By 10:00, Tovey's two battleships had fired over 700 main battery shells, many at very close range. Rodney closed to 2,700 m (3,000 yd), point-blank range for guns of that size, and continued to fire. Bismarck had been reduced to a shambles, aflame from bow to stern. She was slowly settling by the stern from uncontrolled flooding with a 20 degree list to port. Tovey would not cease fire until the Germans struck their ensigns or it became clear they were abandoning ship. Overall the four British ships fired more than 2,800 shells at Bismarck, and scored more than 400 hits, but were unable to sink Bismarck by gunfire. The heavy gunfire at virtually point-blank range devastated Bismarck's superstructure and the sections of the hull that were above the waterline, causing very heavy casualties, but it contributed little to the eventual sinking of the ship. Rodney fired two torpedoes from her port-side tube and claimed one hit. According to Ludovic Kennedy, "if true, [this is] the only instance in history of one battleship torpedoing another".

The scuttling charges detonated around 10:20. (Note: "WHO SANK THE BISMARCK – The British or the Germans? We are convinced the answer is ... "BOTH!!" Bismarck unquestionably would have sunk due to progressive flooding hours after the battle ended. By 0930, CDR Oels heard no response from the Bridge and he knew that the ship was defenceless, when turrets Caesar and Dora were no longer operational. There is enough evidence to indicate that he ordered the ship scuttled to prevent her boarding by the British and to end the agony of the prolonged battering by British shellfire that was hindering escape into the sea.") By 10:35, the ship had assumed a heavy port list, capsizing slowly and sinking by the stern. At around 10:20, running low on fuel, Tovey ordered the cruiser Dorsetshire to sink Bismarck with torpedoes and ordered his battleships back to port. Dorsetshire fired a pair of torpedoes into Bismarck's starboard side, one of which hit. Dorsetshire then moved around to her port side and fired another torpedo, which also hit. By the time these torpedo attacks took place, the ship was already listing so badly that the deck was partly awash. It appears that the final torpedo may have detonated against Bismarck's port side superstructure, which was by then already underwater. Bismarck disappeared beneath the surface at 10:40.

Junack, who had abandoned ship by the time it capsized, observed no underwater damage to the ship's starboard side. Müllenheim-Rechberg reported the same but assumed that the port side, which was then under water, had been more significantly damaged. Some survivors reported they saw Captain Lindemann standing at attention at the stem of the ship as she sank. Around eight hundred to a thousand men were now in the water; Dorsetshire and the destroyer Maori moved in and lowered ropes to pull the survivors aboard. At 11:40, Dorsetshire's captain ordered the rescue effort abandoned after lookouts spotted what they thought was a U-boat. Dorsetshire had rescued 85 men and Maori had picked up 25 by the time they left the scene. U-74, which had been watching the action from a distance, rescued three men from a rubber dinghy in the evening at 19:30. The next day the German trawler Sachsenwald rescued another two from a raft at 22:45. One of the men picked up by the British died of his wounds the following day. Out of a crew of over 2,200 men, only 114 survived.

== Wreckage ==
=== Discovery by Robert Ballard ===
Painting by Ken Marschall depicting the unmanned probe Argo exploring the wreck

The wreck of Bismarck was discovered on 8 June 1989 by Robert Ballard, the oceanographer responsible for finding RMS Titanic. Bismarck was found to be resting on her keel at a depth of approximately 4,791 m (15,719 ft), about 650 km (400 mi) west of Brest. The ship struck an extinct underwater volcano, which rose some 1,000 m (3,300 ft) above the surrounding abyssal plain, triggering a 2 km (1.2 mi) landslide. Bismarck slid down the mountain, coming to a stop about two-thirds of the way down. Ballard kept the wreck's exact location a secret to prevent other divers from taking artefacts from the ship, a practice he considered a form of grave robbing.

Ballard's survey found no underwater penetrations of the ship's fully armoured citadel. Eight holes were found in the hull, one on the starboard side and seven on the port side, all above the waterline. One of the holes is in the deck, on the bow's starboard side. The angle and shape indicates the shell that created the hole was fired from Bismarck's port side and struck the starboard anchor chain. The anchor chain has disappeared down this hole. Six holes are amidships, three shell fragments pierced the upper splinter belt, and one made a hole in the main armour belt. Further aft a huge hole is visible, parallel to the aircraft catapult, on the deck. The submersibles recorded no sign of a shell penetration through the main or side armour here, and it is likely that the shell penetrated the deck armour only. Naval historians William Garzke and Robert Dulin noted that the British battleships were shooting at very close range; the flat trajectory of the shells made it difficult to hit the relatively narrow target represented by the belt armour above the waterline due to the high waves, caused by gale-force winds, which shielded the belt armour as shells that fell short would either strike the water and ricochet up into the superstructure or explode after striking the waves.

Ballard noted that he found no evidence of the internal implosions that occur when a hull that is not fully flooded sinks. The surrounding water, which has much greater pressure than the air in the hull, would crush the ship. Instead, Ballard points out that the hull is in relatively good condition; he states simply that "Bismarck did not implode." This suggests that Bismarck's compartments were flooded when the ship sank, supporting the scuttling theory. Ballard added "we found a hull that appears whole and relatively undamaged by the descent and impact". They concluded that the direct cause of sinking was scuttling: sabotage of engine-room valves by her crew, as claimed by German survivors.

The whole stern had broken away; as it was not near the main wreckage and has not yet been found, it can be assumed this did not occur on impact with the sea floor. The missing section came away roughly where the torpedo had hit, raising questions of possible structural failure. The stern area had also received several hits, increasing the torpedo damage. This, coupled with the fact the ship sank stern first and had no structural support to hold it in place, suggests the stern detached at the surface. While no one onboard Bismarck when it sank could confirm or deny that, Prinz Eugen's stern collapsed after it was similarly torpedoed in the stern in 1942. This prompted the Germans to strengthen the stern structures on all German capital ships.

=== Subsequent expeditions ===
In June 2001, Deep Ocean Expeditions, partnered with Woods Hole Oceanographic Institution, conducted another investigation of the wreck. The researchers used Russian-built mini-submarines. William N. Lange, a Woods Hole expert, stated, "You see a large number of shell holes in the superstructure and deck, but not that many along the side, and none below the waterline." The expedition found no penetrations in the main armoured belt, above or below the waterline. The examiners noted several long gashes in the hull, but attributed these to impact on the sea floor.

An Anglo-American expedition in July 2001 was funded by a British TV channel. The team used the volcano—the only one in that area—to locate the wreck. Using ROVs to film the hull, the team concluded that the ship had sunk due to combat damage. Expedition leader David Mearns claimed significant gashes had been found in the hull: "My feeling is that those holes were probably lengthened by the slide, but initiated by torpedoes".

The 2002 documentary Expedition: Bismarck, directed by James Cameron and filmed in May–June 2002 using smaller and more agile Mir submersibles, reconstructed the events leading to the sinking. These provided the first interior shots. Unlike the Ballard expedition, Cameron's investigation was able to examine parts of the sides of the hull. When Bismarck hit the bottom bow first, massive "hydraulic outburst" separated much of the shell plating of the hull along the line where it joined the bottom of the armour belt. The decks under the armour deck have been compressed by 3 to 4 metres. The most extensive damage, including the gashes Mearns observed, was thus due to impact of the hull with the ocean floor as opposed to directly due to battle damage.

Although around 719 large calibre shells were fired at Bismarck that morning, Cameron's survey noted only two instances where the 320 mm main side belt armour had actually been fully penetrated in the visible parts of the hull. These were both on the starboard side amidships. One hole is forward of the 320 mm displaced armour belt. In the second case the explosion dislodged a rectangular segment of the 320 mm armour. Instead, the expedition argues long range plunging fire hitting the deck was almost completely responsible for the damage that directly contributed to the sinking of the ship. The later close-range shelling (including by secondary armament) "devastated the superstructure and exposed parts of the hull above the waterline, and caused massive casualties", but contributed little to the sinking of the ship. British gunnery accuracy was "mediocre at best", partially due to the "miserable" firing conditions and the ship's list to port, with only around 10% of fired medium calibre shots hitting.

The Cameron report stated that "The devastation caused by the shellfire combined with the effects of several torpedo hits to overwhelm and defeat the Bismarck, causing the ship to begin sinking due to uncontrollable progressive flooding. The German crew sped the inevitable demise of their ship by initiating scuttling measures." It suggests the torpedoes may have increased the subsequent extensive damage to the ship when it hit the ocean floor. In some cases the torpedo blasts had failed to shatter the torpedo bulkheads. and some hits claimed may have been torpedoes that exploded prematurely due to the heavy seas. However the locations of other hits were buried in mud or were impossible to distinguish due to the extent of overall damage to the ship. Overall the report disputed Mearns' claim that scuttling was irrelevant to the timing of the sinking.

Despite their sometimes differing viewpoints, these experts generally agree that Bismarck would have eventually foundered if the Germans had not scuttled her first. Ballard estimated that Bismarck could still have floated for at least a day when the British vessels ceased gunfire, but before Bismarck was torpedoed by Dorsetshire, and could have been captured by the Royal Navy, a position supported by Ludovic Kennedy (who was serving on the destroyer HMS Tartar at the time). Kennedy stated, "That she would have foundered eventually there can be little doubt; but the scuttling ensured that it was sooner rather than later." The Cameron expedition's report asserts "Bismarck unquestionably would have sunk due to progressive flooding hours after the battle ended". In Mearns' subsequent book Hood and Bismarck, he conceded that scuttling "may have hastened the inevitable, but only by a matter of minutes." Ballard later concluded that "As far as I was concerned, the British had sunk the ship regardless of who delivered the final blow."

== See also ==
- Unsinkable Sam – Cat which is said to have survived the sinking of Bismarck
- Last Nine Days of the Bismarck – 1959 novel by C. S. Forester
- Sink the Bismarck! – 1960 film based on the Forester novel
- "Sink the Bismark" – 1960 song by Johnny Horton
