= Unsinkable Sam =

Cat who survived three sinking ships

Oscar
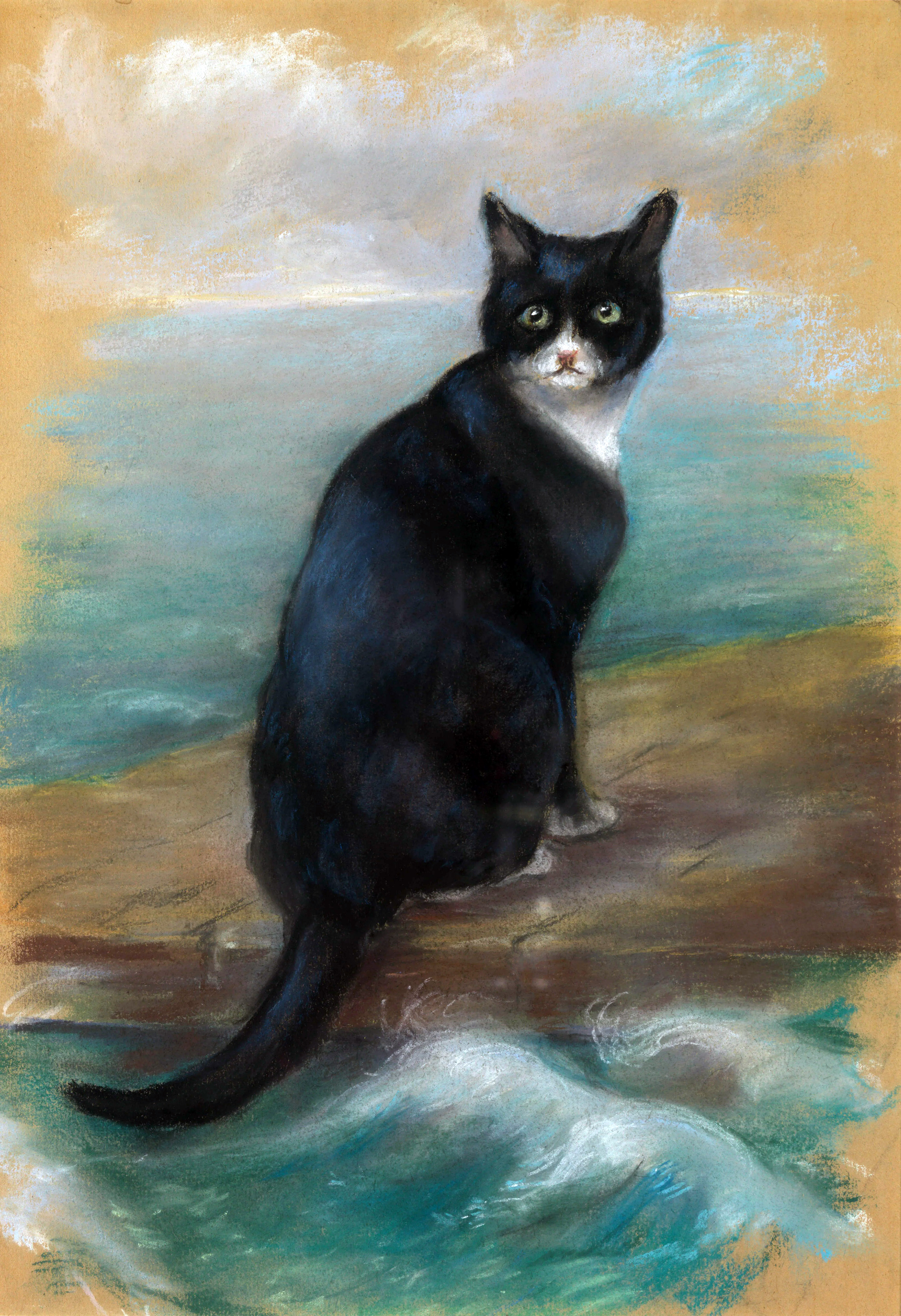
- Portrait of Unsinkable Sam by Georgina Shaw-Baker
- Other names: Unsinkable Sam; Oscar
- Species: Domestic cat
- Breed: Domestic shorthair
- Sex: Male
- Born: Before 1941
- Died: 1955 (more than 15 years old); Belfast, Northern Ireland
- Employer: Kriegsmarine; Royal Navy
- Notable role: Ship's cat
- Years active: 1941–1943

Oscar (known by his nickname, Unsinkable Sam, or by the Germanized spelling of his name, Oskar; before 1941 – 1955) was a ship's cat who purportedly served during World War II with both the Kriegsmarine and the Royal Navy and survived the sinking of three ships in 1941 – the German battleship Bismarck, and then the British destroyer HMS Cossack and aircraft carrier HMS Ark Royal. While contemporary reports of the story were widely publicised in 1941 after the sinking of Ark Royal, including photographs of Oscar, there is no firm evidence to link the cat to Bismarck or Cossack.

== Contemporary reports ==
On 14 November 1941, the aircraft carrier HMS Ark Royal was torpedoed and sank a short distance from Gibraltar, where she was returning after ferrying aircraft to Malta in Operation Perpetual. The sinking was announced the same day, and two days later on 16 November the Admiralty confirmed that only one man had been killed. The newspaper reports noted that "most of" the ship's six cats had been saved – though not her canaries.

A Reuters wire story from Gibraltar on 18 November claimed that a black cat had been found floating on a plank after Ark Royal sank and was rescued; he was identified as "Oscar", formerly a pet aboard the Bismarck, who had been rescued by the destroyer HMS Cossack and transferred at some point to Ark Royal before she sank. He was rescued "having lost two of his nine lives". An interview with three survivors by the Yorkshire Post a few days later quoted a petty officer as saying that "both the ship's cats" had been saved, "Oscar (previously the pet of the Bismarck's crew) and Parry". (The number of cats aboard varied dramatically in different reports – a Daily Express journalist who witnessed the sinking mentioned an unnamed ginger cat, "one of dozens", carried overboard by a rating.)

"Oscar" reappeared in the press in early December, when he was reported by the Northern Irish papers to have been taken to the Derry Sailor's Rest and given to the manager there, Margaret Hill of Enniscorthy. One of these reports was the first to add the embellishment that he had been aboard Cossack when she was sunk, not merely transferred. In February 1942, Hill married an American technician, Paul Boone, and reported she planned to take Oscar with her to America after the war. In March, he was the focus of a program on Armed Forces Radio broadcast from Derry, where "Oscar himself made himself heard to millions of listeners".

== Historicity ==
While the contemporary reports from 1941 do identify a cat named Oscar as being rescued from Ark Royal, and suggest the crew of Ark Royal did claim he had previously been aboard Bismarck, the details of his earlier life are murkier. Some authorities question whether Oscar's biography might be a "sea story", because – for example – there are pictures of two different cats identified as Oscar (or Sam).

There is no mention of this incident in Ludovic Kennedy's detailed account of the sinking of the Bismarck, suggesting that information later gleaned from sailors regarding the cat's true service was apocryphal. There were only a limited number of human survivors, as British ships had to abandon picking up survivors as there was believed to be a U-boat in the area.

== Further details ==
Various further details are found in modern versions of the story.

It has been suggested that the name "Oscar" was given by the crew of the British destroyer HMS Cossack that rescued him from the sea following the sinking of the German battleship Bismarck, since his original name was never known. "Oscar" was derived from the International Code of Signals for the letter 'O', which is code for "Man Overboard" (the German spelling, "Oskar", was sometimes used, since he was a German cat).

The black-and-white-patched cat was supposedly owned by an unknown crewman of the German battleship Bismarck and was on board the ship on 18 May 1941 when she set sail on Operation Rheinübung, Bismarck's only mission. Bismarck was sunk after a fierce naval battle on 27 May, and only 115 of her crew of over 2,100 survived the engagement. Hours later, Oscar was purportedly found floating on a board and picked from the water by the British destroyer HMS Cossack. Unaware of what his name had been on Bismarck, the crew of Cossack named their new mascot "Oscar".

On 24 October 1941, Cossack was escorting a convoy from Gibraltar to Great Britain when she was severely damaged by a torpedo fired by the German submarine U-563. The initial explosion had blown off one third of the forward section of the ship, killing 159 of the crew; however, Oscar survived this, too, and was subsequently brought to the shore establishment in Gibraltar. The crew were transferred to the destroyer HMS Legion, and an attempt was made to tow the badly listing Cossack back to Gibraltar. However, worsening weather conditions meant the task became impossible and had to be abandoned. On 27 October, a day after the tow was slipped, Cossack sank to the west of Gibraltar.

Now nicknamed "Unsinkable Sam", the cat was soon transferred to the aircraft carrier HMS Ark Royal (PN-91), which coincidentally had been instrumental in the destruction of Bismarck (along with Cossack). However, Sam was to find no better luck there, and when returning from Malta on 14 November 1941, the ship was torpedoed, this time by U-81. Attempts were also made to tow Ark Royal to Gibraltar, but the inflow of water made the task futile. The carrier rolled over and sank 30 miles from Gibraltar. The slow rate at which the ship sank meant that all but one of the crew could be saved. The survivors, including Sam, who had been found clinging to a floating plank by the crew of a motor launch and described as "angry but quite unharmed", were transferred to HMS Lightning and the same HMS Legion which had rescued the crew of Cossack. Legion was itself sunk in 1942, while the Lightning would be sunk in 1943.

The loss of Ark Royal proved the end of Sam's shipborne career. He was transferred first to the offices of the Governor of Gibraltar and then sent back to the United Kingdom, where he saw out the remainder of the war living in a seaman's home in Belfast called the "Home for Sailors". Sam died in 1955. A pastel portrait of Sam by the artist Georgina Shaw-Baker is in the possession of the National Maritime Museum in Greenwich.

== See also ==
- List of individual cats
