= Leonard B. Smith =

American aviator (1915–2006)

Leonard B. "Tuck" Smith (October 29, 1915 in Mayview, Missouri – May 16, 2006 in Friday Harbor, Washington) was an American pilot who spotted the German battleship Bismarck prior to its being sunk by British naval and air forces. Smith was the first American to participate in a World War II naval victory and is sometimes considered the first American to be directly involved in World War II for his actions.

A number of US pilots, who had ferried Catalinas across to the UK and were supposed to familiarize the RAF crews with the plane, were unofficially used as copilots on operations ("unofficially" because the USA was not at war with Germany at that time). Smith was acting as copilot of AH545 WQ-Z of No. 209 Squadron RAF which had been specifically assigned a search area after contact was lost with the Bismarck shortly after the Battle of the Denmark Strait. They flew out of RAF Castle Archdale which was a flying boat base on Lough Erne and through the Donegal Corridor. The plane was primarily piloted by British Flying Officer Dennis Briggs but Smith was at the controls when the battleship was spotted around at 10:10 on 26 May 1941, heading for Brest. He jettisoned the depth charges and made for cloud cover under heavy anti-aircraft fire, losing sight of the Bismarck and never regaining contact. Two other Americans were also in Catalinas that spotted the Bismarck later in the day: Lt Johnson in M of No. 240 Squadron RAF, and Ensign Rinehart in O of No. 210 Squadron RAF. Knowing the battleship's position accurately enabled the British navy to intercept it and sink it soon after.

Smith was awarded the Distinguished Flying Cross for his role in the sinking of the Bismarck. He was later sent to Hawaii, and was flying a training mission between Midway and Pearl Harbor when the base was attacked on the morning of December 7, 1941. He remained in the Pacific Theatre for the remainder of the war, later fought in Korea and in the early stages of the Vietnam War, reached the rank of captain, and retired from the Navy in 1962, after 23 years on active duty. After his retirement from the Navy, he worked as a real estate businessman. He lived in Friday Harbor on San Juan Island, Washington. He died in 2006 at the age of 90.

At one stage during his naval career Smith worked alongside Richard Nixon, whom he described as "one of the most conscientious and hard-working officers I ever met".

== See also ==
- Bismarck: The Report of the Scouting and Search for Bismarck by Ensign Smith
- Roscoe Creed: PBY: The Catalina Flying Boat, p. 246–247. Annapolis, Md.: Naval Institute Press, 1985.
