= The Last Nine Days of the Bismarck =

1959 novel by C. S. Forester

- First U.S. edition Cover art by Samuel H. Bryant
- Author: C. S. Forester
- Publisher: Little, Brown & Co.
- Publication date: 9 March 1959

The Last Nine Days of the Bismarck (Little Brown), also published as Hunting the Bismark, is a 1959 novel by C. S. Forester, best known as the author of the popular Horatio Hornblower series of naval-themed books. Closely based on the actual sinking of the German battleship Bismarck, the novel includes fictionalized dialogue and incidents.

The Last Nine Days of the Bismarck tells the story of the breakout of the Bismarck into the Atlantic as a major threat to the convoys that sustained Britain in the early days of World War II, and the Royal Navy's desperate pursuit and destruction of the ship. Sink the Bismarck!, a movie based on Forester's book, was released by Twentieth Century-Fox in 1960, with the book reprinted in paperback under the title Sink the Bismarck! (Bantam, 1959) as a promotional tie-in.

== Reception ==
Kirkus Reviews called the book "a thrilling tale of a running battle at sea."
