= Dwight Yoakam albums discography =

Dwight Yoakam discography
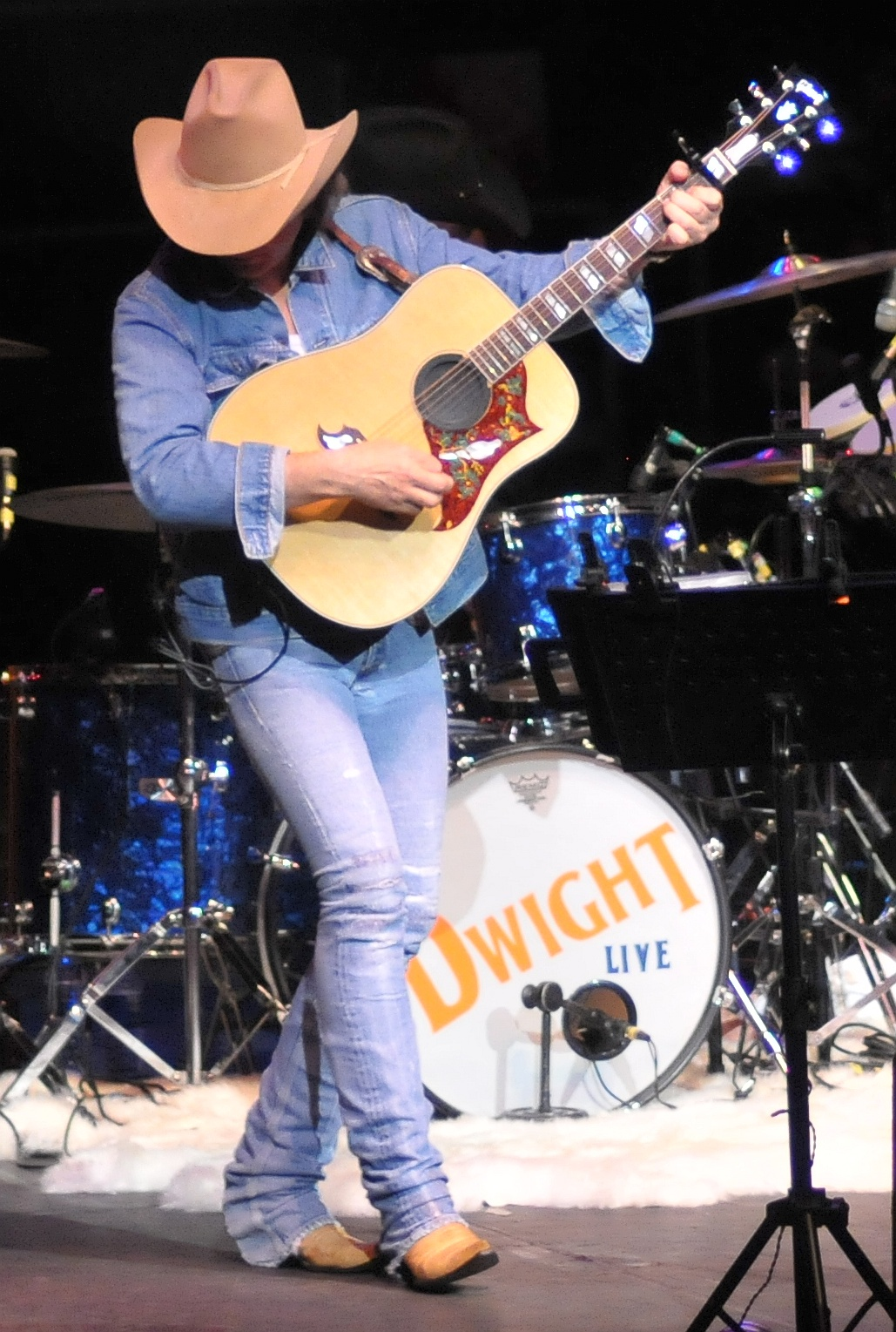
- Dwight Yoakam at San Diego County Fair
- Studio albums: 17
- Live albums: 2
- Compilation albums: 9

Dwight Yoakam is an American country music singer-songwriter. Since his debut in 1984, Yoakam has released 17 studio albums. His debut album, Guitars, Cadillacs, Etc., Etc., was certified double-platinum by the Recording Industry Association of America, while This Time is certified triple-platinum by the same organization. Yoakam achieved the greatest success of his career in the 1980s and 1990s, however, in the 2000s, he left Reprise Records/Warner Bros. Nashville for an independent record label Audium/Koch Records in 2003 and released Population Me. In 2005, he released Blame the Vain on New West Records. The album was a commercial success on the charts, however, no singles that were released cracked the Top 40 of the Hot Country Songs chart.

In addition to releasing his studio albums, Yoakam has also released numerous compilation albums on various record labels, with a vast majority of them reaching success on the charts. His 1989 album Just Lookin' for a Hit is his best-selling compilation album.

== Studio albums ==
=== 1980s ===
Title	Details	Peak chart positions								Certifications (sales threshold)
Title	Details	US Country	US	CAN Country	CAN	AUS	NZ	SWE	UK	Certifications (sales threshold)
Guitars, Cadillacs, Etc., Etc.^{[A]}	Release date: March 3, 1986; Label: Reprise Records; Formats: CD, cassette, LP	1	61	—	—	89	—	—	—	US: 2× Platinum; AUS: Gold
Hillbilly Deluxe	Release date: July 7, 1987; Label: Reprise Records; Formats: CD, cassette, LP	1	55	—	27	55	17	33	51	AUS: Gold; US: Platinum
Buenas Noches From a Lonely Room	Release date: August 2, 1988; Label: Reprise Records; Formats: CD, cassette, LP	1	68	17	47	91	37	37	87	US: Platinum
"—" denotes releases that did not chart

=== 1990s ===
Title	Details	Peak chart positions					Certifications (sales threshold)
Title	Details	US Country	US	CAN Country	CAN	AUS	Certifications (sales threshold)
If There Was a Way	Release date: October 30, 1990; Label: Reprise Records; Formats: CD, cassette, LP	7	96	—	—	147	CAN: Platinum; US: Platinum
This Time	Release date: March 23, 1993; Label: Reprise Records; Formats: CD, cassette	4	25	1	19	121	CAN: 2× Platinum; US: 3× Platinum
Gone	Release date: October 31, 1995; Label: Reprise Records; Formats: CD, cassette	5	30	5	42	17	CAN: Gold; US: Gold
Under the Covers	Release date: July 15, 1997; Label: Reprise Records; Formats: CD, cassette	8	92	—	8	74	
Come On Christmas	Release date: August 26, 1997; Label: Reprise Records; Formats: CD, cassette	32	—	—	—	—	
A Long Way Home	Release date: June 9, 1998; Label: Reprise Records; Formats: CD, cassette	11	60	12	67	—	
"—" denotes releases that did not chart

=== 2000s ===
Title	Details	Peak chart positions			
Title	Details	US Country	US	US Indie	SWE
Tomorrow's Sounds Today^{[B]}	Release date: October 31, 2000; Label: Reprise Records; Formats: CD, cassette	7	68	—	—
South of Heaven, West of Hell	Release date: October 2, 2001; Label: Warner Bros. Nashville; Formats: CD, cassette	59	—	—	—
Population Me	Release date: June 24, 2003; Label: Koch-Audium Records; Formats: CD, cassette	8	75	3	—
Blame the Vain	Release date: June 14, 2005; Label: New West Records; Formats: CD, music download	8	54	3	47
Dwight Sings Buck	Release date: October 23, 2007; Label: New West Records; Formats: CD, music download	11	42	1	11
"—" denotes releases that did not chart

=== 2010s - 2020s ===
Title	Details	Peak chart positions		
Title	Details	US Country	US	AUS
3 Pears	Release date: September 18, 2012; Label: Warner Bros. Nashville; Formats: CD, LP, music download	3	18	—
Second Hand Heart	Release date: April 14, 2015; Label: Warner Bros. Nashville; Formats: CD, LP, music download	2	18	46
Swimmin' Pools, Movie Stars...	Release date: September 23, 2016; Label: Sugar Hill Records; Formats: CD, LP, music download	6	62	—
Brighter Days	Release date: November 15, 2024; Label: Via/Thirty Tigers; Formats: CD, music download	—	—	—
"—" denotes releases that did not chart

== Compilation albums ==
Title	Details	Peak chart positions					Certifications (sales threshold)
Title	Details	US Country	US	CAN Country	CAN	NOR	Certifications (sales threshold)
Just Lookin' for a Hit	Release date: September 20, 1989; Label: Reprise Records; Formats: CD, cassette, LP	3	68	—	64	—	US: Platinum
This Is Dwight Yoakam	Release date: 1990; Label: Reprise Records; Formats: CD, cassette	—	—	—	—	—	
La Croix D'Amour	Release date: September 28, 1992; Label: Reprise Records; Formats: CD, cassette	—	—	—	—	—	
Last Chance for a Thousand Years: Dwight Yoakam's Greatest Hits from the 90's	Release date: May 18, 1999; Label: Reprise Records; Formats: CD, cassette	10	80	5	—	—	AUS: Gold; US: Gold
Reprise Please Baby: The Warner Bros. Years	Release date: November 19, 2002; Label: Reprise Records; Formats: 4-CD Box set	—	—	—	—	—	
In Others' Words	Released: September 23, 2003; Label: Reprise Records; Formats: CD, cassette	59	—	—	—	—	
Dwight's Used Records	Release date: June 29, 2004; Label: Koch-Audium Records; Formats: CD, music download	57	—	43	—	—	
The Very Best of Dwight Yoakam	Release date: July 27, 2004; Label: Rhino Records; Formats: CD, music download	10	87	—	—	14	US: Platinum
The Platinum Collection	Release date: 2006 (UK and Australia); Label: Warner Platinum; Formats: CD	—	—	—	—	—	ARIA: Gold
21st Century Hits: Best of 2000–2012	Release date: October 1, 2013; Label: New West Records; Formats: CD, music download	59	—	—	—	—	
"—" denotes releases that did not chart or were not released in that country

== Live albums ==
Title	Details	Peak chart positions			Certifications (sales threshold)
Title	Details	US Country	US	CAN Country	Certifications (sales threshold)
Dwight Live	Release date: May 23, 1995; Label: Reprise Records; Formats: CD, cassette	8	56	4	US: Gold
dwightyoakamacoustic.net	Release date: May 30, 2000; Label: Reprise Records; Formats: CD, cassette	24	195	6	
Live from Austin, TX	Release date: November 1, 2005; Label: New West Records; Formats: CD, LP	—	—	—	

== Extended plays ==
Title	Details
Guitars, Cadillacs, Etc., Etc.	Release date: 1984; Label: Oak; Formats: LP, cassette
Bring Home the Holidays	Release date: November 2003; Label: Koch-Audium Records/Mervyn's; Formats: CD

== Notes ==
- A Guitars, Cadillacs, Etc., Etc. was re-issued in 2006 with extra bonus demos and live tracks.
- B Tomorrow's Sounds Today also peaked at number 28 on the Canadian RPM Country Albums chart.
