= 21st Century Hits: Best of 2000–2012 =

Compilation album by Dwight Yoakam
- Released: October 1, 2013
- Genre: Country
- Length: 47:50
- Label: New West
- Producer: Pete Anderson; John Shanks; Dwight Yoakam

Dwight Yoakam chronology
| 3 Pears (2012) | 21st Century Hits: Best of 2000–2012 (2013) | Second Hand Heart (2015) |

Professional ratings
Review scores
| Source | Rating |
|---|---|
| AllMusic | 3.5/5 stars |

21st Century Hits: Best of 2000–2012 is the fourth greatest hits compilation album by American country music artist Dwight Yoakam. It was released by New West Records on October 1, 2013. It includes songs from the albums Tomorrow's Sounds Today, Population Me, Blame the Vain, Dwight Sings Buck and 3 Pears, as well as a previously unreleased duet with Michelle Branch and a cover of "Crazy Little Thing Called Love" from his previous greatest hits collection, the 1999 Last Chance for a Thousand Years, that also appeared on the soundtrack to the 2006 film The Break-Up.

== Track listing ==
| No. | Title | Writer(s) | Length |
|---|---|---|---|
| 1. | "The Sad Side of Town" | Dwight Yoakam, Buck Owens | 2:51 |
| 2. | "The Late Great Golden State" | Mike Stinson | 2:28 |
| 3. | "The Back of Your Hand" | Gregg Lee Henry | 3:07 |
| 4. | "If Teardrops Were Diamonds" (with Willie Nelson) | Yoakam | 3:18 |
| 5. | "Long Goodbye" (with Michelle Branch) | Michelle Branch, Hillary Lindsey | 3:40 |
| 6. | "Intentional Heartache" | Yoakam | 4:25 |
| 7. | "Blame the Vain" | Yoakam | 3:39 |
| 8. | "I Wanna Love Again" | Yoakam | 2:57 |
| 9. | "Just Passin' Time" | Yoakam | 3:44 |
| 10. | "Crazy Little Thing Called Love" | Freddie Mercury | 2:20 |
| 11. | "Close Up the Honky Tonks" | Red Simpson | 6:24 |
| 12. | "My Heart Skips a Beat" | Owens | 2:24 |
| 13. | "Act Naturally" | Voni Morrison, Johnny Russell | 2:33 |
| 14. | "A Heart Like Mine" | Yoakam | 4:00 |

== Personnel ==
- Pete Anderson – acoustic guitar, electric guitar, baritone, mandolin, percussion
- Al Bonhomme – acoustic guitar
- Michelle Branch – duet vocals on "Long Goodbye"
- Jim Christie – drums
- Jonathan Clark – background vocals
- Dan Dugmore – pedal steel guitar
- Skip Edwards – Fender Rhodes, pedal steel guitar, keyboards, piano
- Tommy Funderburk – background vocals
- Keith Gattis – bass guitar, electric guitar
- Bob Glaub – bass guitar
- Josh Grange – keyboards, pedal steel guitar
- Bobbye Hall – percussion
- Beck Hansen – handclapping
- Don Heffington – drums
- Scott Joss – fiddle
- Abe Laboriel Jr. – drums
- Gerry McGee – acoustic guitar, soloist
- Mitch Marine – drums
- Cole Marsden – bass guitar
- Gary Morse – banjo, dobro, lap steel guitar, pedal steel guitar
- "Good" Grief Neill – bass guitar
- Willie Nelson – duet vocals on "If Teardrops Were Diamonds"
- Buck Owens – background vocals
- Dean Parks – acoustic guitar
- Eddie "Scarlito" Perez – electric guitar, electric sitar, background vocals
- Taras Prodaniuk – bass guitar
- Raul "Criminal" Mischeif – handclapping
- Dave Roe – background vocals
- Timothy B. Schmit – background vocals
- John Shanks – bass guitar, electric guitar, keyboards
- Kevin C. Smith – bass guitar
- Cassidy Turbin – drums, handclapping
- Dwight Yoakam – acoustic guitar, electric guitar, soloist, lead vocals, background vocals

== Chart performance ==
| Chart (2013) | Peak position |
|---|---|
| US Top Country Albums (Billboard) | 59 |
