= Keep on the Sunny Side =

1899 song

1902 sheet music by Blenkhorn and Entwisle in a Pentecostal Hymn Book

Keep on the Sunny Side (Roud 10082, also known as Keep on the Sunny Side of Life) is a popular American song originally written in 1899 by Ada Blenkhorn (1858–1927) with music by J. Howard Entwisle (1866–1903). The song was popularized in a 1928 recording by the Carter Family. A recording of the song with The Whites was featured in the 2000 movie O Brother, Where Art Thou?.

A variant, "Stay on the Sunny Side", is sometimes sung as a campfire song. It features only the chorus, with some altered lyrics ("You'll feel no pain as we drive you insane"), with knock-knock jokes being told between choruses.

== History ==
In 1899 Ada Blenkhorn was inspired to write the Christian hymn by a phrase used by her nephew. Blenkhorn's nephew was disabled and always wanted his wheelchair pushed down "the sunny side" of the street. The Carter Family learned of the song from A. P. Carter's uncle who was a music teacher, and they recorded the song in Camden, New Jersey in 1928. "Keep on the Sunny Side" became their theme song on the radio in later years. A.P. Carter's tombstone has a gold record of the song embedded in it.

In later years, the Carter Family treated "Keep on the Sunny Side" as a theme song of sorts. A 1964 album by the Carter Family (with special guest vocalist Johnny Cash) was titled Keep on the Sunny Side, and Cash recorded a version for his 1974 album The Junkie and the Juicehead Minus Me accompanied by June Carter Cash, Johnny Cash's daughter Rosanne Cash and June Carter's daughters Carlene Carter and Rosie Nix Adams. June Carter Cash also recorded a version for her final solo album, Wildwood Flower, released posthumously in 2003.

== Lyrics ==
There's a dark and a troubled side of life;
There's a bright and a sunny side, too;
Tho' we meet with the darkness and strife,
The sunny side we also may view.

[chorus]
Keep on the sunny side, always on the sunny side,
Keep on the sunny side of life;
It will help us every day, it will brighten all the way,
If we keep on the sunny side of life.

Tho' the storm in its fury break today,
Crushing hopes that we cherished so dear,
Storm and cloud will in time pass away,
The sun again will shine bright and clear.

Let us greet with a song of hope each day,
Tho' the moments be cloudy or fair;
Let us trust in our Savior always,
Who's keepin everyone in His care.

== Notable recordings ==
- The Carter Family (1928)
- Ian & Sylvia (1967)
- The Deadly Nightshade on Sesame Street (1975)
- The Whites for the Movie O Brother Where Art Thou (2000)
- Brad Paisley on the tribute album Anchored in Love: A Tribute to June Carter Cash (2007)
- Trixie Mattel in documentary Trixie Mattel: Moving Parts (2019)
- John Coventry on his EP "The Roots of Folk" (2020)
- The Dead South on their EP Easy Listening for Jerks Pt. 1 (2022)
- Josie Hope Hall in The Hunger Games: The Ballad of Songbirds & Snakes (2023)
- Dwight Yoakam in Brighter Days (2024)
