= Dwight Yoakam filmography =

American filmography

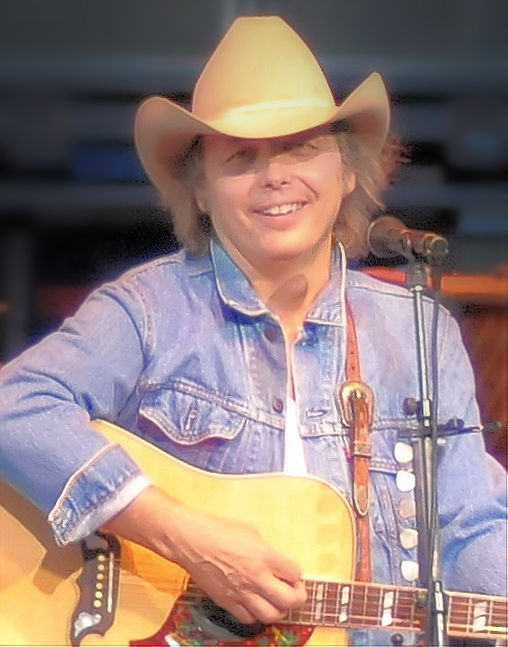
Dwight Yoakam in 2008.

American musician Dwight Yoakam has starred in a number of films and television series ranging from 1992 to the present.

His first major roles included the CBS crime drama P.S. I Luv U and the 1993 movie Red Rock West. In 1996, he had his acting breakthrough in the Billy Bob Thornton movie Sling Blade. For this role, he was nominated for a Screen Actors Guild (SAG) award. Yoakam made his directorial and writing debut in 2000's South of Heaven, West of Hell. Between 2005 and 2006, he also appeared in the movies Bandidas, The Three Burials of Melquiades Estrada, and Wedding Crashers. In 2014, Yoakam had a recurring role in season two of the CBS science fiction series Under the Dome. He also reunited with Thornton for season one of the Amazon Prime Video original series Goliath.

== Film ==
Year	Title	Role	Notes
1992	Red Rock West	Truck Driver	
1995	The Little Death	Bobby Lomax	
1996	Sling Blade	Doyle Hargraves	
1997	Painted Hero	Virgil Kidder	
1998	The Newton Boys	Brentwood 'Brent Glass' Glasscock	
1999	The Minus Man	Blair	
2001	South of Heaven, West of Hell	Valentine Casey	Also director and writer
2002	Panic Room	Raoul	
2003	Hollywood Homicide	Leroy Wasley	
2004	Three Way	Herbert Claremont / Clarkson	
2005	Wedding Crashers	Mr. Kroeger	
2005	The Three Burials of Melquiades Estrada	Sheriff Belmont	
2006	Bandidas	Tyler Jackson	
2006	Crank	'Doc' Miles	
2008	Two:Thirteen	Sandy	
2008	Four Christmases	Pastor Phil	
2009	Crank: High Voltage	'Doc' Miles	
2010	Dirty Girl	Joseph	
2010	The Last Rites of Ransom Pride	Reverend Early Pride	
2010	Bloodworth	Boyd Bloodworth	
2015	90 Minutes in Heaven	Cecil Beaumont	
2017	Logan Lucky	Warden Burns	
2021	Cry Macho	Howard Polk	

== Television ==
Year	Title	Role	Notes
1986	Hee Haw	Himself	Episode: "18.7"
1991	P.S. I Luv U	Harlan Justice	Episode: "I'd Kill to Direct"
1993	Rhythm & Jam	Himself	Television movie
1994	Saturday Night Live	Musical Guest	Episode: "Kelsey Grammer/Dwight Yoakam"
1994	Roswell	Mac Brazel	Television movie
1996	Don't Look Back	Skipper	Television movie
1997	Ellen	The Bag Boy	Episode: "The Puppy Episode – Part 2"
1998	King of the Hill	Lane Pratley	Episode: "Nine Pretty Darn Angry Men"
1998	When Trumpets Fade	Lieutenant Colonel George Rickman	Television movie
2002	Dinner for Five	Himself	Episode: "1.8"
2011–2013	Wilfred	Bruce	3 episodes
2013	To Appomattox	George Meade	7 episodes
2014	Under the Dome	Lyle Chumley	7 episodes
2015	Axe Cop	Egyptian Redneck	Episode: "Mark Frankenstein"
2016	Drunk History	Jesse Benton	Episode: "Bar Fights"
2016	Goliath	Wendell Corey	7 episodes
