= South of Heaven, West of Hell (soundtrack) =

Soundtrack album by Dwight Yoakam
- Released: October 2, 2001
- Genre: Country
- Length: 48:57
- Label: Warner Bros. Nashville
- Producer: Pete Anderson

Dwight Yoakam chronology
Tomorrow's Sounds Today (2000)	South of Heaven, West of Hell (2001)	Reprise Please Baby: The Warner Bros. Years (2002)

Professional ratings
Review scores
Source	Rating
AllMusic	2.5/5 stars

South of Heaven, West of Hell is country singer Dwight Yoakam's 12th studio album, and the first soundtrack album to the motion picture of the same name in which he starred, co-wrote and directed. Yoakam portrays a lawman in the early 1900s in the "wild west" of the Arizona Territory. Half of the tracks in the album are country music tracks. The other tracks are short snippets of straight dialog scenes from the film itself. There are many well-known co-stars in the movie, including Peter Fonda, Bridget Fonda, Paul Reubens, Billy Bob Thornton, Warren Zevon and Vince Vaughn. This was also Yoakam's only album for Warner Bros. after leaving Reprise.

== Background ==
Yoakam, a former drama student who received good reviews for playing an assortment of weirdos and psychopaths in the Nineties, decided to write, produce, score, and star in his own film. On just about every front, the project was an unmitigated disaster. Shortly before production began, the financier backed out and Yoakam made the decision to finance the film on his own, partially through the sale of his home in Malibu. His production company (A Cast of Strays) ultimately filed for Chapter 11 bankruptcy protection, and several crew members registered complaints with unions and filed lawsuits in small claims court against the company. Yoakam said it was "the hardest experience I've ever gone through in my professional life in terms of executing art". To help pay off the debt accrued while making the movie, Yoakam hired a cheaper backing band in 2002, which resulted in a falling out with his longtime producer, bandleader, and guitarist Pete Anderson. Anderson later recalled, “He’d started a film company with Billy Bob Thorton, and I thought it was a great opportunity for them. But I said, ‘Just don’t be in it.’ That’ll come later. Have a little film company and develop something and get your name away from the splatter if it blows up. If you write, direct, produce, act, tap dance, costume – man, every finger's going to point at you if it's not successful.”

== Recording and composition ==
Likely inspired by Quentin Tarantino’s habit of inserting snippets from his films between cuts, Yoakam chose to do the same here. The album's songs have been described as some of Yoakam's "most inspired efforts." The soundtrack is anchored by four gospel songs, including a contemporary take on the hymn "Who at the Door Is Standing" (a duet with Bekka Bramlett), the traditional "The Darkest Hour," the Yoakam-original "The Last Surrender," and "It Is Well with my Soul," which Yoakam sings with only piano accompaniment. In his book A Thousand Miles from Nowhere, biographer Don McCleese writes, "Rarely had Dwight illuminated the religious underpinnings of his music as brightly as he did on 'Who at My Door Is Standing' and 'The Darkest Hour.'" He also enlisted two famous rock legends as songwriting collaborators: ZZ Top's Billy Gibbons on the bluesy "The First thing Smokin'" and Rolling Stone Mick Jagger for the stone-country lament "What’s Left of Me." Anderson supplies atypical arrangements on "Tears for Two" and the longing "Somewhere," the latter of which sounding like the material found on Yoakam's 1995 album Gone, with David McGee in The New Rolling Stone Guide deeming it "an instant Yoakam classic."

== Reception ==
AllMusic: “While the album certainly has its strong points, it is no substitute for a complete Dwight Yoakam record.”

== Track listing ==
1. "Words" (Dwight Yoakam) – 5:21
2. "[Old Friend]" performed by Joe Unger – :51
3. "Who at the Door Is Standing" [with Bekka Bramlett] (M.B.C. Slade, A.B. Everett) – 2:31
4. "[Good Afternoon]" performed by Vince Vaughn and Yoakam – :30
5. "Tears for Two" (Yoakam, Holly Lamar) – 3:23
6. "[Ma'am]" performed by Audrey Lowe and Luke Askew – :41
7. "The Darkest Hour" (Traditional) – 3:28
8. "[When You Was Shot]" performed by Natalie Canerday and Otto Felix – :15
9. "The First Thing Smokin'" (Yoakam, Billy Gibbons) – 3:40
10. "[How Long Was It?]" performed by Terry McIlvaine and Billy Bob Thornton – :10
11. "What's Left of Me" (Yoakam, Mick Jagger) – 4:55
12. "[All Anybody Can Do]" performed by Bridget Fonda – :07
13. "Somewhere" (Yoakam) – 3:48
14. "[A Lotta Good People]" performed by Bo Hopkins – :11
15. "The Last Surrender" (Yoakam) – 2:44
16. "[Show 'Em Your Badge]" performed by Yoakam, Joe Unger, and Terry McIlvaine – :23
17. "No Future in Sight" (Yoakam) – 7:07
18. "[Existence]" performed by Vince Vaughn and Yoakam – :40
19. "It Is Well with My Soul" (Horatio Spafford, Philip Bliss) – 3:25
20. "Words" [instrumental performed by Lee Thornburg] (Yoakam) – 4:47

== Personnel ==
- John Acosta – cello
- Pete Anderson – banjo, acoustic guitar, electric guitar, baritone guitar, mandolin, percussion, piano
- Chris Bleth – bass clarinet, oboe, violin
- Bekka Bramlett – background vocals
- Jim Christie – drums
- Jonathan Clark – background vocals
- Skip Edwards – keyboards
- Otto Felix – background vocals
- Tim Goodwin – classical guitar
- Scott Joss – fiddle
- Jim Lathem – string arrangements
- Gary Morse – lap steel guitar, pedal steel guitar
- John Noreyko – tuba
- Taras Prodaniuk – bass guitar
- Lee Thornburg – trombone, trumpet, horn arrangements
- Billy Bob Thornton – background vocals
- Vince Vaughn – background vocals
- David Woodford – saxophone
- Dwight Yoakam – dobro, acoustic guitar, lead vocals

== Chart performance ==
Chart (2001)	Peak position
U.S. Billboard Top Country Albums	59
