= 1992 Country Music Association Awards =

Annual US music awards ceremony

- Date: September 30, 1992
- Location: Grand Ole Opry House, Nashville, Tennessee
- Hosted by: Vince Gill; Reba McEntire
- Most wins: Garth Brooks; Vince Gill (2 each)
- Most nominations: Vince Gill; Travis Tritt (5 each)

Television/radio coverage
- Network: CBS

The 1992 Country Music Association Awards, 26th Ceremony, was held on September 30, 1992 at the Grand Ole Opry House, Nashville, Tennessee, and was hosted by CMA Award Winners, Vince Gill and Reba McEntire.

== Winners and Nominees ==
Winner are in Bold.

Entertainer of the Year	Album of the Year
**Garth Brooks**; Vince Gill; Alan Jackson; Reba McEntire; Travis Tritt	**Ropin' the Wind — Garth Brooks**; Brand New Man — Brooks & Dunn; For My Broken Heart — Reba McEntire; What Do I Do with Me — Tanya Tucker; Wynonna — Wynonna
Male Vocalist of the Year	Female Vocalist of the Year
**Vince Gill**; Garth Brooks; Joe Diffie; Alan Jackson; Travis Tritt	**Mary Chapin Carpenter**; Reba McEntire; Tanya Tucker; Trisha Yearwood; Wynonna
Vocal Group of the Year	Vocal Duo of the Year
**Diamond Rio**; Alabama; McBride & The Ride; Sawyer Brown; Shenandoah	**Brooks & Dunn**; Baillie & The Boys; Bellamy Brothers; The Judds; Sweethearts of the Rodeo
Single of the Year	Song of the Year
**"Achy Breaky Heart" — Billy Ray Cyrus**; "I Feel Lucky" — Mary Chapin Carpenter; "Look at Us" — Vince Gill; "Love, Me" — Collin Raye; "Maybe It Was Memphis" — Pam Tillis	**"Look at Us" — Vince Gill and Max D. Barnes**; "Achy Breaky Heart" — Don Von Tress; "Don't Rock The Jukebox" — Alan Jackson, Keith Stegall, and Roger Murrah; "Down At The Twist and Shout" — Mary Chapin Carpenter; "Here's a Quarter (Call Someone Who Cares)" — Travis Tritt; "Love, Me" — Max T. Barnes and Skip Ewing
Horizon Award	Musician of the Year
**Suzy Bogguss**; Brooks & Dunn; Billy Dean; Pam Tillis; Trisha Yearwood	**Mark O'Connor**; Eddie Bayers; Larrie London; Matt Rollings; Brent Rowan
Music Video of the Year	Vocal Event of the Year
**Midnight in Montgomery — Alan Jackson**; Achy Breaky Heart — Billy Ray Cyrus; Anymore — Travis Tritt; Is There Life Out There — Reba McEntire; Look at Us — Vince Gill	**This One's Gonna Hurt You (For A Long, Long Time) — Marty Stuart and Travis Tritt**; Buzzin' Counsins — James McMurtry, Dwight Yoakam, John Prine, Joe Ely and John Mellencamp; Clint Black and Roy Rogers; Keith Whitley and Earl Thomas Conley; Tammy Wynette and Randy Travis

== Performers ==
Performer(s)	Song(s)
Wynonna	"No One Else on Earth"
Alan Jackson	"She's Got the Rhythm (And I Got the Blues)"
Vince Gill	"I Still Believe in You"
Trisha Yearwood; Don Henley	"Walkaway Joe"
Billy Ray Cyrus	"Achy Breaky Heart"
Mary Chapin Carpenter	"I Feel Lucky"
Garth Brooks	"Somewhere Other Than the Night"
Reba McEntire	"The Greatest Man I Never Knew"
Steve Wariner; Lee Roy Parnell; Delbert McClinton; Musician of the Year nominees	"Crash Course in the Blues"
Brooks & Dunn	"Boot Scootin' Boogie"
Pam Tillis; Billy Dean; Suzy Bogguss	Horizon Award Medley "Shake the Sugar Tree" "Billy the Kid" "Outbound Plane"
Tanya Tucker	"It's a Little Too Late"
George Jones; Friends^{[A]}	"I Don't Need Your Rockin' Chair"
Dolly Parton	"Put a Little Love in Your Heart"

^[A] "Friends" that performed with George Jones include: Vince Gill, Mark Chesnutt, Joe Diffie, Alan Jackson, Marty Stuart, Pam Tillis, T. Graham Brown, Patty Loveless and Clint Black

== Presenters ==
Presenter(s)	Notes
Clint Black	Vocal Duo of the Year
Mac Davis	Album of the Year
Patty Loveless	Male Vocalist of the Year
Kathy Mattea	Vocal Group of the Year
Lyle Lovett	Single of the Year
Doug Stone; Hal Ketchum	Song of the Year
Diamond Rio	Female Vocalist of the Year
Steve Wariner	Musician of the Year
Collin Raye; Michelle Wright	Vocal Event of the Year
Naomi Judd	Horizon Award
Vince Gill	Presented Country Music Hall of Fame Induction of Frances Preston
Lorrie Morgan	Video of the Year
Randy Travis	Presented Country Music Hall of Fame Induction of George Jones
Johnny Cash	Entertainer of the Year

== Hall of Fame ==
Country Music Hall of Fame Inductees
- George Jones
- Frances Preston
