= Brighter Days (Dwight Yoakam album) =

Studio album by Dwight Yoakam
- Released: November 15, 2024
- Genre: Country
- Label: Thirty Tigers
- Producer: Dwight Yoakam

Dwight Yoakam chronology
Swimmin' Pools, Movie Stars... (2016)	Brighter Days (2024)

Brighter Days is the 21st studio album by American country music singer Dwight Yoakam. It was released November 15, 2024 via Thirty Tigers. The album includes the single "I'll Pay the Price".

== Content ==
Yoakam announced the release of Brighter Days in late 2024. The album was preceded by a lead single titled "I'll Pay the Price". At the same time, he also released a music video for the track "I Don't Know How to Say Goodbye (Bang Bang Boom Boom)", which features Post Malone. Other tracks on the album include covers of the traditional song "Keep on the Sunny Side", as well as Cake's "Bound Away" and the Byrds's "Time Between".

== Critical reception ==
Mark Deming of AllMusic found influences of Bakersfield sound, honky-tonk, rock and roll, and Roy Orbison in individual tracks. His review praised the lyrics of "I'll Pay the Price" and concluded his review by saying, "Yoakam is still one of the liveliest and most satisfying artists in country music, and this sits comfortably beside his great work of the '80s and '90s." No Depression writer Maeri Ferguson called the album "a satisfyingly shiny package that makes it as exciting as a release from a brand new voice. Maybe this is partially because it’s been nearly a decade since Yoakam has released a set of original music, or maybe it’s just that the sound Yoakam originated back in the 1980s still feels so fresh".

== Track listing ==
1. "Wide Open Heart" (Dwight Yoakam, Jeffrey Steele, Shane Minor, Bob DiPiero) - 3:45
2. "I'll Pay the Price" (Dwight Yoakam, Steele) - 4:20
3. "Bound Away" (Greg Brown, Vince DiFiore, John McCrea, Gabe Nelson) - 3:35
4. "California Sky" (Dwight Yoakam, Steele) - 5:02
5. "Can't Be Wrong" (Dwight Yoakam) - 3:25
6. "I Spell Love" (Dwight Yoakam, Steele, DiPiero) - 3:15
7. "A Dream That Never Ends" (Dwight Yoakam, Bryan Joyce) - 3:56
8. "Brighter Days" (Dwight Yoakam, Dalton Yoakam) - 4:06
9. "I Don't Know How to Say Goodbye (Bang Bang Boom Boom)" (Dwight Yoakam) - 3:26
  - featuring Post Malone
10. "If Only" (Dwight Yoakam) - 4:32
11. "Hand Me Down Heart" (Dwight Yoakam, Steele, Minor, DiPiero) - 4:24
12. "Time Between" (Chris Hillman) - 2:39
13. "Keep on the Sunny Side" (Ada Blenkhorn, J. Howard Entwisle) - 4:43
14. "Every Night" (Dwight Yoakam) - 3:34
