= Otto Felix =

American actor

Otto Fellix
- Born: December 31, 1942
- Died: December 13, 2008 (aged 65)
- Occupations: Actor, acting teacher

Otto Felix (December 31, 1942 – December 13, 2008) was a motion picture and television actor, acting teacher and still photographer. Raised in Pennsylvania, and a graduate of Fishburne Military School, Waynesboro, Virginia, then he served in the U.S. Army, and worked as a disc jockey in Florida, before beginning an acting career. Felix was cast in over 350 TV commercials after arriving in Hollywood in the early 1970s.

He played the mellow cop in the Cheech and Chong feature motion picture Up in Smoke (1978).

In his later life Otto Felix was an acting teacher based in Hollywood, California. He specialized in actors just getting a start in the fields of film and television, acting at his Film Actors Shop that also served as the office for his efforts on behalf of H.A.A.P.I. - Handicapped Artists, Performers & Partners, Inc. that he founded.

As a screenwriter, he received a "story by" credit on South of Heaven, West of Hell (2000) a movie western directed by Dwight Yoakam.

Felix authored several books of poems, still photographs and drawings. As a still photographer he shot the cover for Dwight Yoakam's first album Guitars, Cadillacs, Etc., Etc. (1986). His photographs appeared in Time, People, Life, BAM, L.A. Weekly, Billboard, Drama Logue, Variety, and Photographer. He won the Golden Boot Award for Best Country Album and The American Photographers Association Award for best Black & White in 1989 & 99.

Felix died unexpectedly on the 13th December 2008 after a short illness, with a diagnosis of amyloidosis.
