= Population Me =

Studio album by Dwight Yoakam
- Released: June 24, 2003
- Genre: Country
- Length: 31:51
- Label: Audium Records
- Producer: Pete Anderson

Dwight Yoakam chronology
Reprise Please Baby: The Warner Bros. Years (2002)	Population Me (2003)	In Others' Words (2003)

Professional ratings
Review scores
Source	Rating
AllMusic	4/5 stars

Population Me is the 13th studio album by Dwight Yoakam. It was released in June 2003 via the Audium Records label. The album spawned two singles, "The Back of Your Hand" and "The Late Great Golden State".

== Background ==
After fulfilling his contract with Reprise, Yoakam moved to Warner Bros. and released the soundtrack to South of Heaven – West of Hell, a film he wrote, directed, and ultimately financed, much to his own detriment; the movie was panned by critics and went largely unseen. Yoakam then signed with Audium and became a top priority, but the budget for recording was scaled down considerably and the independent label did not have the muscle to get Yoakam the radio play necessary for a return to his commercial heyday at Reprise.

== Recording and composition ==
Although unquestionably a country record, Population Me offers a wider array of musical colors than the straight country sound on Yoakam's 2000 studio release Tomorrow’s Sounds Today. Bluegrass legend Earl Scruggs plays banjo on the reworked cover of Burt Bacharach's "Trains and Boats and Planes," and banjo is also prominently featured on the Los Angeles singer-songwriter Mike Stinson's "The Late Great Golden State," which features Timothy B. Schmit of the Eagles on background vocals. Thom Jurek of AllMusic enthuses, "…on the title track driven by guitar ace Pete Anderson and pedal steel, banjo, and dobro king Gary Morse, Yoakam weaves a perfect blend of driving rockabilly, Chuck Berry, and honky tonk."

Yoakam's seven original songs are full of disgruntled lovers, confusion, and longing. The minor key title track evokes Hank Williams's "Ramblin' Man" with bleak lines like, "This place will tell you lies with each passing shadow…" while "No Such Thing" is a disillusioned post-mortem of a broken relationship that reflects "We never laughed, we never cried/That’s not true, it's better to lie…" Similarly, on the punning "Fair to Midland" the narrator laments "I'm only closer to how far away can be." The poetic lyrics and descending chorus on "An Exception to the Rule" sounds like Gordon Lightfoot filtered through Bakersfield, while "Stayin' Up Late (Thinkin' About It)" and "I'd Avoid Me Too" are more blatant tips of the hats to the Bakersfield honky-tonks.

Population Me is arguably best remembered for two reasons. First, it contains the duet "If Teardrops Were Diamonds" with outlaw legend Willie Nelson, adding a gorgeous pop sensibility to Yoakam's hillbilly moan. Second, it would be the last Yoakam studio album of new material to be produced by bandleader Pete Anderson. The pair split acrimoniously after a near-twenty year musical partnership when Yoakam decided to cut costs and tour without him, which lead to a lawsuit that was settled out of court.

== Reception ==
AllMusic: "Yoakam's songwriting continues to grow and transform itself into an accurate reflection of American culture as felt through the poetic heart of a country musician. The songs are right there: lean, tough, raw, and drenched with hooks as well as emotions -- check out the honky tonk stroll of ‘I'd Avoid Me Too.’ This is stellar, kickin' impure country."

== Track listing ==
All tracks are written by Dwight Yoakam unless otherwise indicated.

No.	Title	Writer(s)	Length
1.	"The Late Great Golden State"	Mike Stinson	2:26
2.	"No Such Thing"		3:19
3.	"Fair to Midland"		3:26
4.	"An Exception to the Rule"		2:20
5.	"Population Me"		4:42
6.	"Stayin' Up Late (Thinkin' About It)"		2:50
7.	"Trains and Boats and Planes"	Burt Bacharach, Hal David	3:21
8.	"If Teardrops Were Diamonds" (duet with Willie Nelson)		3:20
9.	"I'd Avoid Me Too"		2:59
10.	"The Back of Your Hand"	Gregg Lee Henry	3:08

== Personnel ==
- Pete Anderson - acoustic guitar, electric guitar, mandolin, percussion, string arrangements
- Al Bonhomme - acoustic guitar
- Jonathan Clark - background vocals
- Skip Edwards - keyboards, string arrangements
- Tommy Funderburk - background vocals
- Bob Glaub - bass guitar
- Don Heffington - drums
- Scott Joss - fiddle
- Gary Morse - banjo, dobro, pedal steel guitar
- Willie Nelson - duet vocals on "If Teardrops Were Diamonds"
- Timothy B. Schmit - background vocals
- Earl Scruggs - banjo
- Kevin Sepriano - handclapping
- Lee Thornburg - trumpet, trombone
- Gabe Witcher - fiddle
- Dwight Yoakam - acoustic guitar, lead vocals

== Chart performance ==
=== Weekly charts ===
Chart (2003)	Peak position
US Billboard 200	75
US Top Country Albums (Billboard)	8
US Independent Albums (Billboard)	3

=== Year-end charts ===
Chart (2003)	Position
US Top Country Albums (Billboard)	69

=== Singles ===
Year	Single	Chart positions
Year	Single	US Country
2003	"The Back of Your Hand"	52
2003	"The Late Great Golden State"	52
