= Dwight's Used Records =

Compilation album by Dwight Yoakam
- Released: June 29, 2004
- Genre: Country
- Length: 50:37
- Label: Audium
- Producer: Pete Anderson

Dwight Yoakam chronology
In Others' Words (2003)	Dwight's Used Records (2004)	The Very Best of Dwight Yoakam (2004)

Professional ratings
Review scores
Source	Rating
AllMusic	4/5 stars

Dwight's Used Records is a compilation album by American country music artist Dwight Yoakam. It was released by Audium Records on June 29, 2004. The album peaked at number 57 on the Billboard Top Country Albums chart.

== Recording ==
The album features cuts Yoakam contributed to several tribute compilations, duets that appeared on other artists' albums, and a few unreleased covers. He released the album in an effort to fulfill his recording contract to Audium, much like his old label Reprise did with the LP In Others' Words the previous year.

== Reception ==
Dwight's Used Records was Yoakam's third covers album since 1997 and was not a commercial success. Mark Deming of AllMusic said, "Few if any major country artists of the 1980s and '90s had as consistent a run of strong recordings as Dwight Yoakam, and this compilation proves that even the material he gave away was better than what most of his peers were sending out as top-shelf product."

== Track listing ==
No.	Title	Writer(s)	Length
1.	"Stop the World (And Let Me Off)"	Carl Belew, W. S. Stevenson	3:08
2.	"Down Where the River Bends" (with Ralph Stanley)	Ralph Stanley	2:55
3.	"Mercury Blues"	K. C. Douglas, Robert Geddins	2:29
4.	"Waiting" (with Deana Carter)	Deana Carter, Dwight Yoakam	4:37
5.	"Some Dark Holler" (with the Nitty Gritty Dirt Band)	Traditional	3:20
6.	"If You Were Me (And I Were You)"	Webb Pierce, Frank Miller	2:50
7.	"Little Chapel" (with Heather Myles)	Heather Myles	2:57
8.	"The Loco-Motion"	Carole King, Gerry Goffin	3:44
9.	"Miner's Prayer" (with Ralph Stanley)	Yoakam	3:13
10.	"Understand Your Man"	Johnny Cash	3:13
11.	"Wheels" (with the Nitty Gritty Dirt Band)	Chris Hillman, Gram Parsons	3:16
12.	"I'm Bad, I'm Nationwide"	Billy Gibbons, Dusty Hill, Frank Beard	4:14
13.	"Paradise"	John Prine	6:24
14.	"I Said (Paradise Reprise)"	Prine	4:17

== Personnel ==
- Deana Carter - duet vocals on "Waiting"
- Skip Edwards - percussion, piano, Wurlitzer piano
- Keith Gattis - baritone guitar, electric guitar
- Mitch Marine - drums, percussion
- Heather Myles - duet vocals on "Little Chapel"
- The Nitty Gritty Dirt Band - vocals on "Some Dark Holler" and "Wheels"
- Dave Roe - bass guitar, upright bass, background vocals
- Ralph Stanley - duet vocals on "Down Where the River Bends" and "Miner's Prayer"
- Kay Walker - background vocals
- Ray C. Walker - background vocals
- Gabe Witcher - fiddle, mandolin, background vocals
- Michael Witcher - dobro
- Dwight Yoakam - cymbals, acoustic guitar, percussion, lead vocals

== Chart performance ==
Chart (2004)	Peak position
U.S. Billboard Top Country Albums	57
U.S. Billboard Top Independent Albums	43
