= In Others' Words =

Compilation album by Dwight Yoakam
- Released: September 23, 2003
- Genre: Country
- Length: 36:01
- Label: Reprise
- Producer: Pete Anderson

Dwight Yoakam chronology
Population Me (2003)	In Others' Words (2003)	Dwight's Used Records (2004)

Professional ratings
Review scores
Source	Rating
Allmusic	3/5 stars

In Others' Words is a compilation album, and the second covers album by American country music artist Dwight Yoakam. It was released on September 23, 2003 on Reprise Records and peaked at number 59 on the Billboard Top Country Albums chart.

== Recording ==
Yoakam enjoyed a successful commercial run with Reprise from 1986 to 1993, but by 2000 the hits dried up and he left for Warner Bros. To fulfill his contract, Reprise gathered recordings from various soundtracks and tribute albums from the 1990s to piece together In Others’ Words, a sequel of sorts to Yoakam’s 1997 Under the Covers LP. “Holding Things Together,” for example, is from the Merle Haggard tribute album Tulare Dust, while “Truckin’,” appears on the Grateful Dead project Deadicated. “Cattle Call” can be found on the soundtrack to The Horse Whisperer, while "T For Texas (Blue Yodel No. 1)" previously appeared as a hidden track at the end of Under the Covers.

Despite the mixed bag of sources, In Others’ Words sounds remarkably cohesive as a collection of Americana. Yoakam composed the album opener “Borrowed Love” with Randy Scruggs and his father, banjo legend Earl Scruggs, who appear on the track. Western swing legend Bob Wills is also faithfully represented with “New San Antonio Rose, and Bill Monroe’s “Rocky Road Blues” was a number Yoakam and The Babylonian Cowboys rocked up as part their live set in the early days, as can be heard on the 2006 Rhino deluxe edition of Guitars, Cadillacs, Etc., Etc., but this version remains faithful to Monroe’s musical template. Yoakam once said the song was an early example of what could have been a rockabilly cut, or rock and roll. “Rapid City, South Dakota” and "Louisville," the lone new cut, are honky-tonk songs with more acoustic instruments than electric—particularly the ringing dobro and shimmering mandolins on the latter. The album closes with Junior Parker’s “Mystery Train,” but Yoakam and producer Pete Anderson rev it up rockabilly style as they did on earlier hits like “Little Sister” and “Please, Please Baby.”

== Reception ==
AllMusic: “For those fans of Yoakam's who buy his studio records and get frustrated at the sheer number of compilation and soundtrack cuts he has, this might do the trick to satisfy in lieu of a new album.”

== Track listing ==
No.	Title	Writer(s)	Length
1.	"Borrowed Love"	Earl Scruggs, Randy Scruggs, Dwight Yoakam	2:59
2.	"Rocky Road Blues"	Bill Monroe	3:06
3.	"T for Texas (Blue Yodel No. 1)"	Jimmie Rodgers	5:31
4.	"Cattle Call"	Tex Owens	3:23
5.	"Truckin'"	Jerry Garcia, Robert Hunter, Phil Lesh, Bob Weir	5:26
6.	"New San Antonio Rose"	Bob Wills	3:03
7.	"Rapid City, South Dakota"	Kinky Friedman	2:50
8.	"Louisville"	Jann Browne, Pat Gallagher	3:03
9.	"Holding Things Together"	Merle Haggard, Bob Totten	2:36
10.	"Mystery Train"	Junior Parker, Sam Phillips	4:04
Total length:			36:01

== Chart performance ==
Chart (2003)	Peak position
U.S. Billboard Top Country Albums	59
