= Reprise Please Baby: The Warner Bros. Years =

Compilation album by Dwight Yoakam
- Released: November 19, 2002
- Genre: Country
- Length: 302:22
- Language: English
- Label: Reprise/Warner Bros.
- Producer: Pete Anderson

Dwight Yoakam chronology
South of Heaven, West of Hell (2001)	Reprise Please Baby: The Warner Bros. Years (2002)	Population Me (2003)

You combine drummers with mountain people, and you've got hillbilly music. That's what we're doing: Bill Monroe with drums.

— Yoakam in the liner notes to Reprise Please Baby: The Warner Bros. Years

Reprise Please Baby: The Warner Bros. Years is a 2002 box set of songs by American country musician Dwight Yoakam, highlighting his career on Reprise Records and Warner Bros. Records, along with his initial 1981 demos and two new tracks. It has received positive reviews from critics.

== Reception ==
Writing for The A. V. Club, Stephen Thompson stated that this compilation "has more than settled any arguments about Yoakam's rightful place in modern country's canon" by including material from his "fine" 1980s releases as well as the musician's "immensely satisfying but lesser-known '90s catalog". Editors at AllMusic rated this album 5 out of 5 stars, with critic Stephen Thomas Erlewine writing that "on Rhino's excellent four-disc box set" Yoakam's influence on country music is display with "a superb chronicling of his time at Reprise/Warner Records" that "doesn't focus simply on the hits", adding up to music that is "all necessary to understanding Yoakam's music and his influence". Jim Caligiuri of The Austin Chronicle also rated this box set 5 out of 5 stars, characterizing it as "a testament to a talent unmatched in many ways" and "a marvelous first chapter in a career that shows no signs of slowing down". In a brief overview of box sets released at the end of 2002, Neil Strauss stated that the best part of Reprise Please Baby: The Warner Bros. Years was the fourth disc of previously unreleased studio and live material and continued that "in this set, one can hear [Yoakam']s stubborn traditionalism and his innate eclecticism intertwine as two decades roll by". No Depression's review stated that "so many good points jump out of the speakers here", displaying that "Yoakam is equally at home with all forms of country from the second half of the 20th century".

== Track listing ==
All songs written by Dwight Yoakam, except where noted.

Disc 1

1. "Honky Tonk Man" (Tillman Franks, Howard Hausey, Johnny Horton) – 2:48
2. "Guitars, Cadillacs" – 3:05
3. "It Won't Hurt" – 3:05
4. "Miner’s Prayer" – 2:19
5. "Little Sister" (Doc Pomus, Mort Shuman) – 3:03
6. "Little Ways" – 3:21
7. "Please, Please Baby" – 3:35
8. "Always Late with Your Kisses" (Blackie Crawford, Lefty Frizzell) – 2:11
9. "This Drinkin’ Will Kill Me" – 2:34
10. "Streets of Bakersfield" (Homer Joy) – 2:50
  - featuring Buck Owens
11. "I Sang Dixie" – 3:49
12. "I Got You" – 3:29
13. "I Hear You Knockin’" (Dave Bartholomew) – 3:15
14. "Buenas Noches from a Lonely Room (She Wore Red Dresses)" – 4:33
15. "Long White Cadillac" (Dave Alvin) – 5:19
16. "Turn It On, Turn It Up, Turn Me Loose" (Kostas, Wayland Patton) – 3:25
17. "You're the One" – 4:00
18. "Nothing's Changed Here" (Kostas and Yoakam) – 2:58
19. "It Only Hurts When I Cry" (Roger Miller, Yoakam) – 2:35
20. "The Heart That You Own" – 3:10
21. "The Distance Between You and Me" – 2:42
22. "Dangerous Man" – 4:18
23. "Send a Message to My Heart" (Kostas, Kathy Louvin) – 3:16
  - featuring Patty Loveless
24. "Takes a Lot to Rock You" – 2:57

Disc 2

1. "Carmelita" (Warren Zevon) – 3:25
2. "Suspicious Minds" (live) (Mark James) – 6:55
3. "Doin' What I Did" – 3:26
4. "Hey Little Girl" (Don Baskin, Robert Gonzales) – 2:32
5. "Ain't That Lonely Yet" (James House, Kostas) – 3:19
6. "A Thousand Miles from Nowhere" – 4:29
7. "Try Not to Look So Pretty" (Kostas, Yoakam) – 2:56
8. "Pocket of a Clown" – 2:57
9. "Home for Sale" – 3:39
10. "Fast as You" – 4:47
11. "King of Fools" (Kostas, Yoakam) – 4:05
12. "Holding Things Together" (Merle Haggard, Bob Totten) – 2:37
13. "Nothing" (Kostas, Yoakam) – 3:53
14. "Don’t Be Sad" – 3:20
15. "Sorry You Asked?" – 3:23
16. "Gone (That’ll Be Me)" – 2:49
17. "Claudette" (Roy Orbison) – 2:56
18. "Baby Don't Go" (Sonny Bono) – 4:00
19. "Train in Vain" (Mick Jones, Joe Strummer) – 3:23
20. "Rapid City, South Dakota" (Kinky Friedman) – 2:49

Disc 3

1. "Only Want You More" – 3:22
2. "Same Fool" – 3:02
3. "Things Change" – 3:45
4. "These Arms" – 3:31
5. "A Long Way Home" – 2:55
6. "Crazy Little Thing Called Love" (Freddie Mercury) – 2:22
7. "Thinking About Leaving" (Rodney Crowell, Yoakam) – 3:56
8. "New San Antonio Rose" (Bob Wills) – 3:03
9. "Two Doors Down" (acoustic) (Kostas, Yoakam) – 4:38
10. "Bury Me" (acoustic) – 3:13
11. "Love Caught Up to Me" – 3:50
12. "What Do You Know About Love" – 2:56
13. "Free to Go" – 4:48
14. "A Place to Cry" – 4:35
15. "I Want You to Want Me" (Rick Nielsen) – 3:28
16. "Alright, I’m Wrong" (Pete Anderson and Cisco) – 4:16
17. "Who at the Door Is Standing" – 2:33
18. "The First Thing Smokin'" (Billy Gibbons, Yoakam) – 3:41
19. "I’m Bad, I’m Nationwide" (Frank Beard, Gibbons, Dusty Hill) – 4:13
20. "Louisville" (Jann Browne, Pat Gallagher) – 3:04
21. "Sittin' Pretty" – 2:24
22. "Mercury Blues" (K. C. Douglas and Robert Geddins) – 2:25

Disc 4

1. "This Drinkin’ Will Kill Me" – 3:11
2. "It Won’t Hurt" – 3:47
3. "I’ll Be Gone" – 3:25
4. "Floyd County" – 2:38
5. "You’re the One" – 4:03
6. "Twenty Years" – 3:03
7. "Please Daddy" – 3:20
8. "Miner’s Prayer" – 2:44
9. "I Sang Dixie" – 3:46
10. "Bury Me" – 3:01
11. "Golden Ring" (Bobby Braddock, Rafe Van Hoy) – 3:15
12. "Take Me" (George Jones, Leon Payne) – 2:20
13. "Sin City" (Chris Hillman, Gram Parsons) – 4:02
14. "Truckin'" (live) (Jerry Garcia, Robert Hunter, Phil Lesh, Bob Weir) – 7:22
15. "Grand Tour" (live) (George Richey, Carmol Taylor, Norro Wilson) – 3:42
16. "Oh Lonesome Me" (live) (Don Gibson) – 3:29
17. "Today I Started Loving You Again" (live) (Haggard, Bonnie Owens) – 4:30
18. "Mystery Train" (live) (Junior Parker and Sam Phillips) – 3:11
19. "Can’t You Hear Me Calling" (live) (Bill Monroe) – 3:20
20. "Heartaches by the Number" (live) (Harlan Howard) – 3:42
21. "My Bucket’s Got a Hole in It" (live) (Louis Armstrong, Velma Middleton, Clarence Williams, Hank Williams) – 4:12

== Personnel ==
- Dwight Yoakam – guitar, acoustic guitar, autoharp, percussion, vocals, backing vocals, arrangement, mixing, production, art direction

Musicians

- Dave Alexander – trumpet
- Tommy Allsup – guitar
- Beth Andersen – backing vocals
- Maxi Anderson – backing vocals
- Pete Anderson – six-string bass, banjo, guitar, twelve-string guitar, acoustic guitar, baritone guitar, electric guitar, harmonica, mandolin, percussion, piano, electric sitar, backing vocals, arrangement, mixing, production
- Asleep at the Wheel – performance on "New San Antonio Rose"
- Richard Bennett – fills, acoustic guitar, requinto
- Ray Benson – guitar, production on additional recordings
- Al Bonhomme – acoustics guitar
- Chris Booher – piano
- Bekka Bramlett – backing vocals on "Who at the Door Is Standing"
- Tom Brumley – steel guitar
- Bill Campbell – bass
- Tony Campise – alto saxophone
- Cindy Cashdollar – steel guitar
- Lenny Castro – percussion
- Jim Christie – drums
- Jonathan Clark – harmony vocals, backing vocals
- Anthony Crawford – backing vocals
- Davey Crockett – drums
- Sheryl Crow – vocals on "Baby Don’t Go"
- Floyd Domino – piano
- Jeff Donavan – drums
- Skip Edwards – accordion, keyboards, organ, pedal steel guitar, piano, Wurlitzer
- Bruce Eskovitz – flute, alto saxophone, tenor saxophone
- Phillip Fajardo – drums
- J. D. Foster – bass
- Michael Francis – clarinet, tenor saxophone
- Tommy Funderburk – backing vocals
- Bob Glaub – bass
- John Goux – acoustic guitar
- Jim Haas – backing vocals
- Glen D. Hardin – piano
- Elias Haslanger – tenor saxophone
- Chris Hillman – piano
- Don Heffington – drums
- Carl Jackson – backing vocals
- Duane Jarvis – rhythm guitar
- Flaco Jiménez – accordion on "Carmelita", harmony vocal on "Carmelita"
- Eric Jorgensen – trombone
- Scott Joss – fiddle, mandolin, backing vocals
- Brantley Kearns – fiddle, backing vocals
- Nick Lane – trombone
- Bryan Lasley – art direction
- Jim Lauderdale – backing vocals
- Greg Leisz – lap steel guitar
- Patty Loveless – vocals on "Send a Message to My Heart"
- Jay Dee Maness – pedal steel
- David Mansfield – dobro, fiddle, mandolin
- Bryan McConkey – engineering
- Jerry McGee – guitar
- David Earl Miller – bass
- Roger Miller – backing vocals on "It Only Hurts When I Cry"
- Gary Morse – dobro, lap steel guitar, pedal steel
- Marty Muse – dobro
- John Noreyko – tuba
- Tim O'Brien – mandolin, backing vocals
- Buck Owens – vocals on "Streets of Bakersfield" and "Alright, I’m Wrong", liner notes
- Dean Parks – acoustic guitar
- Herb Pedersen – backing vocals
- Al Perkins – banjo, dobro, lap steel guitar, pedal steel guitar
- Tom Peterson – flute, alto saxophone, baritone saxophone, tenor saxophone
- Earl Lon Price – tenor saxophone
- Taras Prodaniuk – bass guitar, upright bass
- Amy Ray – backing vocals
- Don Reed – fiddle
- Jason Roberts – fiddle
- Jeff Rymes – backing vocals
- David Sanger – drums
- Leland Sklar – bass
- Greg "Frosty" Smith – baritone saxophone, trombone
- Ralph Stanley – banjo, backing vocals
- Lonesome Strangers – backing vocals
- Chris Tedesco – trumpet
- Oscar Tellez – bajo sexto
- Lee Thornburg – horn arrangements, trombone, trumpet
- Carmen Twilley – backing vocals
- Dusty Wakeman – six-string bass guitar, assistance, associate production on additional recordings, engineering, mixing, percussion, programming, backing vocals
- Randy Weeks – backing vocals
- Kelly Willis – vocals on "Golden Ring" and "Take Me"
- David Woodford – saxophone

Technical personnel

- Jeff Albertson – photography
- Greg Allen – photography
- Dave Alvin – liner notes
- Angelic Voices of Faith – assistance
- James Austin – art direction, compilation production, liner notes, photography
- Edie Baskin – photography
- Steve Baughman – assistance
- David Betancourt – assistance
- Tchad Blake – mixing
- James E. Bond – string arrangement
- Charlie Bouis – assistance
- Brad Bowman – photography
- Elijah Bradford – engineering
- Sally Browder – engineering
- Hugh Brown – art direction
- Paul Buckmaster – conducting, string arrangements
- Frank Campbell – engineering, mixing
- Cole Cartwright – project assistance
- Alex Chan – assistance
- Elizabeth Chaumette – photography
- Steven Chean – editorial research
- Judy Clapp – assistance, mixing
- Corbis Outline – photography
- Allen Crider – assistance
- Jasper Dailey – photography
- Jennifer Dejean – project coordination
- Henry Diltz – photography
- Peter Doell – assistance, engineering
- Craig Doubet – assistance
- Michael Dumas – engineering, mixing
- Garrick Ebbins – associate production
- Jimmy Edwards – compilation production
- Sheryl Farber – editorial supervision
- Deborah Feingold – photography
- Ralph Forbes – programming
- Lori Fumar – assistance
- Joe Galante – executive production
- David Gallo – assistance
- Holly George-Warren – liner notes
- Michael Gerber – photography
- Billy Gibbons – liner notes
- Donna Gilbert – photography
- Steven P. Gorman – photography research
- Beth Gwinn – photography
- Jim Hagans – photography
- Bill Halverson – production on additional recordings
- Bill Ham – executive production
- Mark Hanauer – photography
- Steve Himelfarb – assistance
- Dennis Hopper – liner notes
- Scott Humphrey – programming
- Virginia Lee Hunter – photography
- Robin Hurley – project assistance
- Mauricio Iragorri – engineering
- Steve Jennings – photography
- David Jensen – photography
- Kacey Jones – production on additional recordings
- Leslie Ann Jones – assistance, engineering
- Pat Kraus – remastering
- David Leonard – engineering, mixing
- Brian Levi – engineering
- LFI – photography
- David Lopez – assistance
- Kip Lott – photography
- Mark Mander – photography
- Kevin Mazur – cover photography
- Lynn McAfee – photography
- Ron Mesaros – photography
- Alan Messer – photography
- Michael Ochs Archives – photography
- April Milek – project assistance
- Judy Mock – photography
- Steve Morse – editorial, liner notes
- Charlie Paakkari – engineering
- Randy Perry – project assistance
- Martin Pradler – assistance
- Michael Putland – photography
- Kevin Reeves – engineering
- Retna – photography
- Jason Robbins – assistance
- Susan Rosenleib – photography
- Ed Ruscha – liner notes
- Randee Saint Nicholas – photography
- Bonnie Schiffman – photography
- Al Schulman – engineering
- Shooting Star – photography
- Gordon Shryock – engineering, production on additional recordings
- Daniel Steinberg – engineering
- Chris Stone – engineering
- Tim Stroh – engineering
- Jacki Sallow – photography
- Denny Thomas – assistance
- Don C. Tyler – digital editing
- Kenneth A. Van Druten – engineering
- Maria Villar – project assistance
- Cameron Webb – assistance
- Steve Woolard – discographical annotation

== See also ==
- List of 2002 albums
