= Ada Blenkhorn =

Canadian-American hymnwriter

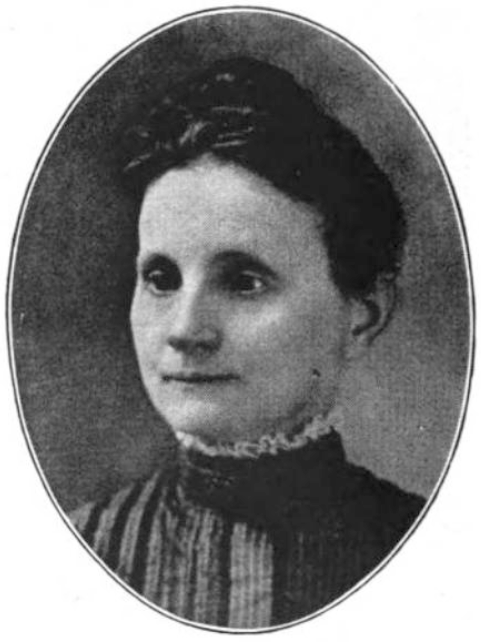
Blenkhorn as pictured in 1916 in Charles H. Gabriel's The Singers and their Songs: Sketches of Living Gospel Hymn Writers

Ada J. Blenkhorn (1858-1927) was a Canadian-American hymnwriter who wrote the lyrics to many well-known Christian hymns including “Let the Sunshine In” and "Keep on the Sunny Side" also known as "Keep on the Sunny Side of Life" in 1899 with music by J. Howard Entwisle (1866–1903).

Blenkhorn was born in Cobourg, Ontario on February 22, 1858, as the tenth of eleven children of William and Sarah (Helm) Blenkhorn, and Blenkhorn was raised as a Methodist and never married as an adult. In 1884 Blenkhorn moved with her family to Cleveland, Ohio. At age thirty-four Blenkhorn began a prolific career writing hymns after being encouraged by a friend not to quit. In 1899 Ada Blenkhorn was inspired to write the Christian hymn, "Keep on the Sunny Side" by a phrase used by her nephew. Blenkhorn's nephew was disabled and always wanted his wheelchair pushed down "the sunny side" of the street. Blenkhorn began working her brother's Henry's, real estate business in 1904 as a secretary, and after he died in 1923, she took over as president of the business. She died on May 7, 1927, and was buried in Lake View Cemetery in Cleveland.
