= 3 Pears =

Studio album by Dwight Yoakam
- Released: September 18, 2012
- Genre: Country
- Length: 45:13
- Label: Warner Bros. Nashville
- Producers: Dwight Yoakam; Beck Hansen

Dwight Yoakam chronology
Dwight Sings Buck (2007)	3 Pears (2012)	21st Century Hits: Best of 2000–2012 (2013)

Professional ratings
Aggregate scores
Source	Rating
Metacritic	86/100
Review scores
Source	Rating
AllMusic	5/5 stars
American Songwriter	4/5 stars
Consequence of Sound	3.5/5 stars
Country Weekly	4/5 stars
Entertainment Weekly	A−
Paste	7.9/10
Tom Hull	B+

3 Pears is the 18th studio album by American country music artist Dwight Yoakam. It was released on September 18, 2012, via Warner Bros. Records. The album, which includes collaborations with Beck, Kid Rock and Ashley Monroe of Pistol Annies, has been one of the most critically acclaimed recordings of Yoakam's career.

== Background ==
In 2005, Yoakam released Blame the Vain on New West, which would establish itself as the premier indie label for the emerging “Americana” movement after the turn of the millennium, cornering the market of this artistry much as Rounder had with folk in earlier decades. Dwight Sings Buck, Yoakam's second New West release, failed to make the Top 10 country albums chart, and his last significant hit single had been a cover of the Queen song “Crazy Little Thing Called Love” back in 1999. It was the singer's second stint with an independent label after leaving Warner Bros. where he enjoyed his biggest commercial success in the late-1980s and early-1990s with Reprise, but, as Yoakam biographer Don McCleese observes, despite Blame the Vain being a critical hit, “New West had no connection to country radio and the country music industry at large, and that's still where Dwight's commercial significance lay. What had made him singular was his ability to straddle mainstream country and progressive Americana.” After leaving New West amicably, Yoakam came full circle by resigning with Warner Bros. Nashville in 2011.

== Recording and composition ==
3 Pears, his first release of original material in seven years, was a huge comeback for Yoakam and one of the most critically acclaimed recordings of his career. It peaked at No. 18 on the Billboard 200 album chart, becoming Yoakam's highest position on the general music chart. By the end of 2012, 3 Pears had appeared on more critic's annual "Best Of" lists than any other album in the country music genre. It debuted on Billboard 200 at No. 18, and on the Top Country Albums chart at No. 3, selling 19,000 copies in its first week. As of April 2015, the album has sold 101,000 copies in the U.S. 3 Pears reached No. 1 on the Americana Radio chart on October 29, 2012, and it broke the 2012 record for most weeks at No. 1 on Americana Radio. This return to commercial success and visibility was in part due to Yoakam, who put out quality material for years without having a hit single, taking his place as a country legend in his own right, a maverick and outlaw who, like Buck Owens and Willie Nelson, stuck to his musical guns regardless of trends in the business.

Yoakam produced the album himself, with the exception of "A Heart Like Mine" and "Missing Heart," which were produced by Beck. The singer later told CMT that Beck is “completely responsive to what you’re doing in any given moment. When I played songs for him the first time, he reacted in an almost visceral way. He literally would pull physically. His body would kind of jerk in reaction to a specific chord change or movement of the guitar.” Lyrically, 3 Pears contains some of the most optimistic songs Yoakam has recorded, with one critic commenting, “Throughout 3 Pears Yoakam reveals a vulnerability — a kind of openness to the world — that seems at odds with the cool customer he’s perceived to be.” This attitude is immediately apparent on the hopeful opening track “Take Hold of My Hand,” which promises “The hurt from before don’t live here no more,” while the second song, “Waterfall,” includes arguably the most whimsically saccharine line the songwriter has ever penned: “If I had a jellyfish/Bet you we would never miss/A single peanut butter kiss or squeeze.” Other songs, like “Trying” and “Long Way to Go,” are persevering in their outlooks as well. Yoakam later reflected, “I think it expressed the thought that it’s just as easy to look for the joy and happiness in life as it is to dwell on the things that are not so happy. And maybe it’s in response to a lot of folks in the last four years and the struggles with the economy feeling really weighted down.”

Musically 3 Pears displays diverse musical styles beyond the usual “hillbilly” music the singer incorporated early in his career.

Yoakam liked the Martin Scorsese documentary about George Harrison, Living in the Material World, and 3 Pears takes its title from a scene in which John Lennon plays around with three pairs of glasses.

Rolling Stone named the song "A Heart Like Mine" the 39th best song of 2012. The music video was directed by Margaret Malandruccolo.

== Track listing ==
All tracks are written by Dwight Yoakam except where noted.

No.	Title	Writer(s)	Length
1.	"Take Hold of My Hand"	Yoakam, Robert Ritchie	3:43
2.	"Waterfall"		3:37
3.	"Dim Lights, Thick Smoke"	Max Fidler, Joe Maphis, Rose Lee Maphis	3:43
4.	"Trying"		2:55
5.	"Nothing but Love"		3:04
6.	"It's Never Alright"	Yoakam, Ashley Monroe	4:09
7.	"A Heart Like Mine"		3:58
8.	"Long Way to Go"		3:50
9.	"Missing Heart"		4:34
10.	"3 Pears"		2:46
11.	"Rock It All Away"		4:20
12.	"Long Way to Go" (reprise)		4:34

== Personnel ==
- Rick "The" Baptist – trumpets (6)
- Charlie Bisharat – violin (6)
- David Campbell – string arrangements (6), brass arrangements (6), conducting (6)
- Jonathan Clark – background vocals (1, 3, 5–9, 11), bass guitar (2, 3, 4, 11)
- Martin Cooke – tambourine (4)
- Marc DeSisto – handclaps (10)
- Jason Falkner – bass guitar (9), electric guitar (9)
- Chris Gray – trumpets (6)
- Beck Hansen – handclaps (7)
- Doyle Hargraves – handclaps (10)
- Alan Kaplan – trombone (6)
- Suzie Katayama – cellos (6)
- Darrin McCann – viola (6)
- Mitch Marine – drums (1–6, 8, 10, 11)
- Cole Marsden – bass guitars (7)
- Joe Meyer – French horn (6)
- Kevin Mills – tambourine (1)
- Raul Mischief – handclaps (7)
- "Good" Grief Neill – bass guitars (7)
- Eddie "Scarlito" Perez – lead guitar (3, 6, 11), background vocals (3)
- Steve Richards – cellos (6)
- Cassidy Turbin – drums (7), handclaps (7)
- Joey Waronker – drums (9), percussion (9)
- Brian Whelan – background vocals (1, 2, 4, 5, 10, 11), bass guitar (1, 5, 6, 8, 10), organ (2, 4, 6, 8, 11), piano (2, 3, 6, 12), steel guitar (1, 3, 9), harmonium (1), Wurlitzer (5), keyboards (10), tambourine (10), handclaps (10), slide guitar (11)
- Dwight Yoakam – lead vocals, electric guitar (1–5, 7, 8, 10, 11), acoustic guitar (1, 4, 6–9, 11), tambourine (4, 5), background vocals (11)

== Chart performance ==
Chart (2012)	Peak position
Australian Country Albums Chart	2
US Billboard 200	18
US Billboard Top Country Albums	3
