= Second Hand Heart (album) =

Studio album by Dwight Yoakam
- Released: April 14, 2015
- Genre: Country
- Length: 40:50
- Label: Warner Bros. Nashville
- Producer: Dwight Yoakam; Chris Lord-Alge

Dwight Yoakam chronology
21st Century Hits: Best of 2000–2012 (2013)	Second Hand Heart (2015)	Swimmin' Pools, Movie Stars... (2016)

Professional ratings
Review scores
Source	Rating
AllMusic	4.5/5 stars

Second Hand Heart is the 19th studio album by American country music artist Dwight Yoakam. It was released on April 14, 2015 via Warner Bros. Records.

== Reception ==
The album sold 21,000 copies in its first week of release, debuting at number 2 on the Billboard Top Country Albums chart and becoming Yoakam's highest-charting album since Buenas Noches from a Lonely Room in 1988. The album has sold 87,000 copies in the US as of August 2016.

== Track listing ==
All tracks are written by Dwight Yoakam except where noted.

Second Hand Heart – Standard edition
No.	Title	Writer(s)	Length
1.	"In Another World"		3:52
2.	"She"		3:12
3.	"Dreams of Clay"		5:35
4.	"Second Hand Heart"		4:19
5.	"Off Your Mind"		4:37
6.	"Believe"		4:11
7.	"Man of Constant Sorrow"	Traditional	4:16
8.	"Liar"		3:29
9.	"The Big Time"		3:06
10.	"V's of Birds"	Anthony Crawford	4:13
Total length:			40:50

Second Hand Heart – Target Deluxe Edition
No.	Title	Writer(s)	Length
11.	"The Big Time (1989 Demo)"		2:53
12.	"Who'll Stop the Rain"	John Fogerty	4:40
13.	"Nothing But Love"		3:20

== Personnel ==
- Jonathan Clark - bass guitar, baritone guitar, background vocals
- Eugene Edwards - electric guitar, electric sitar, background vocals
- Mitch Marine - drums, percussion
- Brian Whelan - electric guitar, tremolo guitar, harmonica, mandolin, organ, pedal steel guitar, piano, background vocals
- Dwight Yoakam - acoustic guitar, electric guitar, tambourine, lead vocals, background vocals

== Chart performance ==
=== Weekly charts ===
Chart (2015)	Peak position
UK Country Albums (OCC)	3
US Billboard 200	18
US Top Country Albums (Billboard)	2

=== Year-end charts ===
Chart (2015)	Position
US Top Country Albums (Billboard)	43
