= Blame the Vain =

Studio album by Dwight Yoakam
- Released: June 14, 2005
- Genre: Country
- Length: 44:13
- Label: New West
- Producer: Dwight Yoakam

Dwight Yoakam chronology
The Very Best of Dwight Yoakam (2004)	Blame the Vain (2005)	Dwight Sings Buck (2007)

Professional ratings
Review scores
Source	Rating
AllMusic	4/5 stars

Blame the Vain is the 16th studio album by country music artist Dwight Yoakam, released in June 2005, and his first not to be produced by guitarist producer Pete Anderson. Yoakam wrote all the songs and produced the album himself. He also directed the videos for "Intentional Heartache" and the title track.

== Background ==
After a near twenty year creative partnership, Yoakam and bandleader Anderson went their separate ways after recording Population Me in 2003 when the singer opted to tour with a small group rather than a full band. This was in part due to financial necessity after Yoakam bankrolled his 2001 film project South of Heaven – West of Hell, which was a critical and commercial bust. Both Anderson and Yoakam agreed to be interviewed separately for Don McCleese’s book A Thousand Miles from Nowhere, and while both show a great deal of respect for each other and pride in the music they made together, an undercurrent of tension is evident, with Yoakam stating of his collaboration with Anderson, “Maybe it went about four albums too long.” Anderson, who claims his first love all along was playing in front of an audience as opposed to producing, later explained:

So he toured for the summer after saying he wasn’t going to tour, and I sent him a fax that said I’m out X amount of dollars, a big pile of money. And they made a counteroffer that was really weak. It escalated from there, and we settled out of court…If I had to guess, he probably got tired of me being Pete. Or his feeling constrained that he couldn’t produce himself. In his mind, what he wanted to do is exactly what he did. He wanted to do his own thing the way he did it. He didn’t want me around anymore.

The pair’s commercial peak came in 1993 with the album This Time, but by the early 2000’s Yoakam was no longer on a major label, having signed with the Americana-based New West.

== Recording and composition ==
Yoakam cited Simon and Garfunkel’s masterpiece Bridge Over Troubled Water as an inspiration for the sound he was going for as a producer, detailing to biographer Don McCleese:

I think I did some things with EQ differently. On Blame the Vain, I was doing things with the bass, specifically. The frequency of the bass response was more akin to something you might hear in 1968 than you would in the mid-1970s, when tape heads were wider and you went to twenty-four-track, so you were playing with sonics differently…If you listened to Bridge Over Troubled Water, which was recorded in like 1971, there was this recording technology that we kind of slipped beyond in the mid-1970s, and everything got overly thick. And we lost the beauty of melody.

While Blame the Vain did not result in any hit singles, producing the album appeared to reinvigorate Yoakam, with Mark Deming writing in his AllMusic review of the LP, “With Yoakam producing himself for a change without the help of longtime studio partner Pete Anderson, Blame the Vain also finds him fronting a new band anchored by guitarist Keith Gattis, and the new blood seems to have done wonders for Yoakam - while he wasn't exactly in a slump, Blame the Vain boasts a sharper and more energetic approach than his last several efforts, with ‘Just Passin' Time,’ ‘Three Good Reasons,’ and the title cut revealing that Yoakam is still a honky tonk man supreme.” Thematically, Blame the Vain is concerned with façades and self-deceit that mask the corollaries of heartbreak Yoakam later stated that "I Wanna Love Again" "...was written about my relationship with music. And I wanted to feel like I was fifteen years old again. The song talks about actually having a band, performing live music, or cutting a record, or at sixteen waiting for that opportunity...And it's not easy to get back to that place, that space...

Although steeped in Bakersfield honky-tonk, Yoakam chose to experiment on several tracks, the most obvious examples being “She’ll Remember,” which contains a synthesizer introduction and Yoakam speaking in a quasi-British accent until the songs falls into heavy honky-tonk mode, and the heavily-orchestrated losing track. His acting chops come to the fore again on the storytelling title track as he assumes the role of an awestruck bystander describing the apoplectic woman in the song. Yoakam, who is a big Beatles fan, also chose to open the album with a note of feedback that sounds almost exactly the same as found on the Fab Four’s “I Feel Fine,” and the main guitar part on “When I First Came Here” is reminiscent of “I’ve Got a Feeling” from Let It Be. As one critic noted, “There’s an unbridled lack of restraint on these cuts that listeners could dismiss as self-indulgence but which plainly sound like freedom of the artist.”

== Reception ==
Slant calls Blame the Vain “a new peak in a career full of them and is Yoakam’s finest work in a decade.” AllMusic: “Two decades into his career, Dwight Yoakam is still the man who is too country for Nashville, and on Blame the Vain he shows he's got too much strength and soul to let anyone hold him down - this is inspired stuff from a rebel who still has plenty to offer.”

== Track listing ==
All songs were written and produced by Dwight Yoakam.

1. "Blame the Vain" - 3:40
2. "Lucky That Way" - 3:22
3. "Intentional Heartache" - 4:25
4. "Does It Show?" - 3:48
5. "Three Good Reasons" - 2:37
6. "Just Passin' Time" - 3:46
7. "I'll Pretend" - 2:22
8. "She'll Remember" - 5:26
9. "I Wanna Love Again" - 2:57
10. "When I First Came Here" - 5:47
11. "Watch Out" - 3:03
12. "The Last Heart in Line" - 2:59

== Personnel ==
- Jim Barth - string arrangements
- Jessica Bolter - oboe
- Al Bonhomme - acoustic guitar
- Jonathan Clark - background vocals
- Thomas Dienner - background vocals
- Gary Ebbins - handclapping
- Skip Edwards - Fender Rhodes, Hammond B-3 organ, handclapping, pedal steel guitar, piano, string arrangements, synthesizer, Wurlitzer piano
- Eric Gaenslen - cello
- Keith Gattis - bass guitar, electric guitar, handclapping
- Bobbye Hall - bongos, cabasa, cowbell, shaker, tambourine
- Mitch Marine - drums, handclapping
- Gerry McGee - acoustic guitar, soloist
- Taras Prodaniuk - bass guitar
- Dave Roe - background vocals
- Timothy B. Schmit - background vocals
- Lee Thornburg - french horn
- Phillip Vaiman - violin
- Dwight Yoakam - acoustic guitar, soloist, lead vocals, background vocals

== Chart performance ==
=== Album ===
Chart (2005)	Peak position
U.S. Billboard Top Country Albums	8
U.S. Billboard 200	54
U.S. Billboard Top Independent Albums	3
Swedish Albums Chart	47

=== Singles ===
Year	Single	Chart positions
Year	Single	US Country
2005	"Intentional Heartache"	54
2005	"Blame the Vain"	58
2006	"I Wanna Love Again"	—
"—" denotes releases that did not chart
