= Dwight Sings Buck =

Studio album by Dwight Yoakam
- Released: October 23, 2007
- Genre: Country
- Length: 47:03
- Label: New West
- Producer: Dwight Yoakam

Dwight Yoakam chronology
Blame the Vain (2005)	Dwight Sings Buck (2007)	3 Pears (2012)

Professional ratings
Review scores
Source	Rating
AllMusic	4/5 stars

Dwight Sings Buck is country music artist Dwight Yoakam's 17th studio album, and a tribute album to Buck Owens. The album was released on October 23, 2007 (Yoakam's 51st birthday), by New West Records.

== Background ==
Buck Owens and the Bakersfield sound that Owens helped establish had a profound influence on Dwight Yoakam's musical artistry. In the liner notes to his second album Hillbilly Deluxe Yoakam wrote: "VERY SPECIAL THANKS: to Buck Owens for all his records that still serve as an inspiration for the California honky-tonk sound", and the opening track of that LP, "Little Ways", was an obvious homage to Owens' unique vocal style. After enjoying a run as one of the top country stars of the 1960s, Owens was crushed by the 1974 death of his guitarist and best friend Don Rich, and by the 1980s, after hosting the critically savaged but popular television show Hee Haw, was semi-retired until Yoakam – one of country music's hottest young stars – began touting his records in interviews. Like Owens, Yoakam was considered an iconoclast by many country music industry insiders at the time, and he later recalled:

We sat there that day in 1987 and talked about my music to that point, my short career, and what I'd been doing and how he'd been watching me. I was really flattered and thrilled to know that this legend had been keeping an eye on me.

The pair would record Homer Joy's "Streets of Bakersfield" and it would become Yoakam's first #1 country single, and Owens toured with Yoakam and also made several TV appearances promoting the song, reigniting interest in the country legend. The pair reunited on record in 1996 to sing with Merle Haggard on the song "Beer Can Hill" for Haggard's album 1996, and Owens would sing two songs on Yoakam's 2000 LP Tomorrow's Sounds Today.

== Recording ==
When Owens died in 2006, it seemed inevitable that Yoakam would record a tribute at some point, although the singer insists the songs took shape organically at sound checks and onstage after his hero had died. Ironically, although Yoakam recorded many songs by the likes of Johnny Horton, Johnny Cash, and Elvis Presley, he had not covered Owens's numerous hits. He later recalled to an interviewer:

I’m very proud of that album. I hope it does justice to his memory. I never touched his material before he passed, other than material he brought me. We weren’t mimicking and copying the Buck records. We were making it fresh for 2007. It was really in the spirit of what Buck did.

This was the second album that Yoakam produced without Pete Anderson, the guitarist and artistic foil who, like Don Rich with Owens, enjoyed a long creative partnership. The recordings are buoyant and crisp, with AllMusic's Jeff Tamarkin commenting, “ Yoakam's love for these anthems is palpable in every track. He doesn't set out to imitate Owens' style or delivery, but he does capture the essence of each song, playing them as Buck intended: no frills, no foolin' around…” He plays it mostly straight with the arrangements with a few exceptions, such as the percussion-heavy “Close Up the Honky Tonks,” which stretches to over six minutes, and the atmospheric “Only You,” which begins with a lone organ and slowly builds in a style reminiscent of Roy Orbison. The influence of The Byrds, who also covered Owens's songs, is apparent on “Think of Me,’ while Yoakam's vocal on “Down on the Corner of Love” has traces of Buddy Holly.

== Reception ==
Yoakam biographer Don McCleese calls the LP "an essential work within Yoakam's recorded output – a milestone of sorts, even a capstone."

PopMatters states, "Yoakam manages to sound like he's channeling Owens at his peak, while his band eerily summons the spirits of Don Rich and the rest of the Buckaroos with classics like 'My Heart Skips a Beat', 'Cryin' Time', and 'Above and Beyond'."

AllMusic notes "Is there any singer better suited to record an album of Buck Owens covers than Dwight Yoakam? ... this is a tribute in the purest sense of the word, and an album no fan of either artist should miss."

== Track listing ==
1. "My Heart Skips a Beat" (Buck Owens) – 2:25
2. "Foolin' Around" (Harlan Howard, Owens) – 2:54
3. "I Don't Care (Just as Long as You Love Me)" (Owens) – 2:15
4. "Only You (Can Break My Heart)" (Owens) – 3:56
5. "Act Naturally" (Voni Morrison, Johnny Russell) – 2:33
6. "Down on the Corner of Love" (Owens) – 2:40
7. "Crying Time" (Owens) – 2:40
8. "Above and Beyond" (Howard) – 2:36
9. "Love's Gonna Live Here" (Owens) – 2:04
10. "Close Up the Honky Tonks" (Red Simpson) – 6:24
11. "Under Your Spell Again" (Owens, Dusty Rhodes) – 3:13
12. "Your Tender Loving Care" (Owens) – 3:18
13. "Excuse Me (I Think I've Got a Heartache)" (Howard, Owens) – 2:36
14. "Think of Me" (Estella Olson, Don Rich) – 2:53
15. "Together Again" (Owens) – 4:36

== Charts ==
=== Weekly charts ===
Chart (2007)	Peak position
US Billboard 200	42
US Top Country Albums (Billboard)	11
US Independent Albums (Billboard)	1

=== Year-end charts ===
Chart (2008)	Position
US Top Country Albums (Billboard)	70
US Independent Albums (Billboard)	49

== Personnel ==
Musicians

- Jonathan Clark – bass guitar
- Skip Edwards – piano
- Joshua Grange – pedal steel guitar, organ, piano, keyboards, Wurlitzer
- Bobbye Hall – congas, maracas, shaker, tambourine
- Mitch Marine – drums
- Eddie "Scarlito" Perez – background vocals, electric guitar, electric sitar
- Kevin C. Smith – bass guitar
- Dwight Yoakam – lead vocals, background vocals, acoustic guitar

Technical

- Roberto Bozquez – Assistant, Engineer
- Katherine Delaney – Design
- Michael Dumas – Engineer
- Cambria Lyn Harkey – Photography
- Andy Hayes – Assistant
- David Leonard – Mixing
- Laura McCorkindale – Management
- Stephen Marcussen – Mastering
- Steve Moore – Engineer, Guitar Engineer
- George Nixon – Assistant
- Scott Schenk – Engineer
- Stewart Whitmore – Digital Editing
