= Mike Stinson =

American singer-songwriter and musician

- Genres: Country, country rock
- Occupations: Singer-songwriter, musician
- Instruments: Guitar, drums
- Labels: Boronda Records
- Website: www.mikestinsonmusic.com

Mike Stinson is an American singer-songwriter and musician.

== Career ==
A native of Virginia, Mike Stinson moved to Los Angeles in 1991. Inspired by the country rock of Gram Parsons, as well as more traditional country artists such as Johnny Cash and George Jones, he began to write songs and eventually formed his own band.

Stinson released his debut album Jack of All Heartache in 2002. The album includes a sardonic ode to California entitled "Late Great Golden State." Dwight Yoakam later covered the song on his album Population Me and released it as a single.

Robert Hilburn of the Los Angeles Times wrote in 2003 that Stinson is "one of Los Angeles' best-kept musical secrets." In the 2004 edition of its annual Best of LA feature, Los Angeles magazine selected him as Best Country-Western Artist, adding that "Late Great Golden State" ought to be California's official anthem.

His song "Counting My Lucky Stars," from second album Last Fool at the Bar, was featured in a 2006 episode of the CBS series Cold Case entitled "The Red and the Blue."

Though he plays guitar in his own band, Stinson has worked as a drummer for other musicians, including Christina Aguilera and Lucinda Williams.

Stinson relocated to Houston, Texas in 2009. His most recent album, The Jukebox in Your Heart, was produced by Jesse Dayton and recorded at Willie Nelson's Pedernales Studios in Austin. It includes a new version of "Late Great Golden State."

In 2013 Stinson released Hell And Half of Georgia, which was produced by R.S. Field. In an interview, Stinson described Hell And Half of Georgia as a new direction for his music, "For years I was trying to make a classic country album. Something that would stand alone among the country albums I love that I considered classics. I had the burning desire to do that for a long time and I did it on three records to the best of my ability. And I sort of got it out of my system. I'm sort of exploring other music styles I've been influenced by over the years. This album's got a little muscle, it's a little tougher. The singing is better and the writing is better. I think it shows some growth."

== Discography ==
- Jack of All Heartache (2002)
- Last Fool at the Bar (2005)
- The Jukebox in Your Heart (2010)
- Hell and Half of Georgia (2013)
