= South of Heaven, West of Hell =

2000 American Western film

- Film poster
- Directed by: Dwight Yoakam
- Written by: Dwight Yoakam; Stan Bertheaud; Otto Felix; Dennis Hackin
- Produced by: Gray Frederickson; Darris Hatch
- Starring: Dwight Yoakam; Billy Bob Thornton; Vince Vaughn; Bridget Fonda; Peter Fonda; Paul Reubens; Bud Cort; Michael Jeter; Bo Hopkins; Luke Askew; Joe Ely
- Cinematography: James Glennon
- Edited by: Robert A. Ferretti; Mike Murphy
- Music by: Dwight Yoakam (Additional music by Jim Latham)
- Production companies: Delta Deuce Films; Goldmount Pictures; Movie Mongrel; Trimark Pictures
- Distributed by: August Entertainment; Blue steel Releasing; Emerald; Geneon Entertainment; Jigsaw Entertainment; Phaedra Cinema
- Release dates: January 28, 2000 (Slamdance); December 15, 2000 (United States)
- Running time: 132 minutes
- Country: United States
- Language: English
- Budget: $4,000,000
- Box office: $28,149

South of Heaven, West of Hell is a 2000 American Western film starring Dwight Yoakam, who also co-wrote, directed, and scored the film. The film follows Valentine Casey (Yoakam), a Marshal in the Arizona territory when he receives a surprise visit from his outlaw adoptive father (Luke Askew) on Christmas Eve 1907. This stands as the only film Yoakam has starred in, written and directed.

The film premiered on the closing night of the 2000 Slamdance Film Festival, and released in theatres on December 15, 2000.

== Plot ==
Valentine Casey is the marshal of the New Mexico town of Los Tragos. On Christmas Eve, 1907, Los Tragos is overrun by a violent gang. Casey retreats to the Arizona desert and then to the town of Dunfries where he becomes involved with a blacksmith's beautiful niece. The gang then descends upon Dunfries where Casey must at last stand his ground.

== Cast ==
- Dwight Yoakam as Valentine Casey
- Billy Bob Thornton as Brigadier Smalls
- Vince Vaughn as Taylor Henry
- Bridget Fonda as Adalyne Dunfries
- Peter Fonda as Bill "Shoshonee Bill"
- Paul Reubens as Arvid Henry
- Bud Cort as Agent Otts
- Michael Jeter as Uncle Jude
- Bo Hopkins as Dr. Angus "Doc" Dunfries
- Luke Askew as Leland Henry
- Joe Ely as Paul "Petrified Paul"
- Warren Zevon as Babcock

== Production ==
Shortly before production began, the financier backed out and Yoakam made the decision to finance the film on his own, partially through the sale of his home in Malibu. His production company (A Cast of Strays) ultimately filed for Chapter 11 bankruptcy protection, and several crew members registered complaints with unions and filed lawsuits in small claims court against the company. Yoakam said it was "the hardest experience I've ever gone through in my professional life in terms of executing art". To help pay off the debt accrued while making the movie, Yoakam hired a cheaper backing band in 2002, which resulted in a falling out with his longtime producer, bandleader, and guitarist Pete Anderson. Yoakam originally meant Vincent Gallo to play the lead rather than himself. Nor was he intending to direct it.

== Reception ==
On Rotten Tomatoes, the film has a 14% approval rating, based on 7 reviews with an average rating of 3.50 out of 10. On Metacritic the film has a score of 22% based on reviews from 6 critics, indicating "generally unfavorable reviews".

Robert Koehler of Variety said that the film "lacks the critical ingredients of shape, consistent tone, rhythm and economy that would make this truly old-fashioned oater into a lean, compelling adventure". He added that "there's no grace to the interplay of images and emotions. At every step, the filmmakers seem unable to pull off an exaggerated horse opera, and they never know when to pull the plug on scenes that are going nowhere". Writing for Film Threat, Michael Dequina said in his review that "watching Yoakam's film...is like eating a shit sandwich. The title may be a cutesy joke describing someplace close to hell, but make no mistake—this film is hell."
