= Swimmin' Pools, Movie Stars... =

Studio album by Dwight Yoakam
- Released: July 29, 2016
- Genre: Bluegrass
- Label: Sugar Hill Records
- Producers: Dwight Yoakam, Gary Paczosa, Jon Randall

Dwight Yoakam chronology
| Second Hand Heart (2015) | Swimmin' Pools, Movie Stars... (2016) |

Swimmin' Pools, Movie Stars... is the 20th studio album by the American musician Dwight Yoakam, released in 2016. Yoakam considered it his first bluegrass album. Aside from the cover of "Purple Rain", the album is a collection of bluegrass versions of older Yoakam songs.

The album peaked at No. 62 on the Billboard 200.

== Production ==
The album was produced by Yoakam, Gary Paczosa, and Jon Randall. Yoakam and his band recorded their cover of "Purple Rain" on the day that Prince died—Yoakam saw the news on television as he was leaving for the studio.

== Critical reception ==
Professional ratings
Review scores
| Source | Rating |
|---|---|
| AllMusic | 3.5/5 stars |
| The Sydney Morning Herald | 3.5/5 |

The Sydney Morning Herald called Swimmin' Pools, Movie Stars... a "slightly urbanised, perfectly played bluegrass album." The Morning Star thought that the rendition of "Guitars, Cadillacs" "doesn’t have the impact of the original or the twang, but it has the sway of the fiddles that play off Yoakam’s reverb-laden voice sweetly."

The Knoxville News Sentinel praised the "A-list players," but concluded that "in the end, Swimmin' Pools, Movie Stars ... feels more like a lovable novelty than a lasting statement." The Seattle Times determined that "what is clear is the care Yoakam and his cohorts took in translating some fairly deep cuts into satisfying bluegrass tunes."

AllMusic wrote that "while the notion of Yoakam doing a bluegrass cover of 'Purple Rain' might sound like a high concept hipster joke, he wrings loneliness and loss from that tune with a delivery that's moving without becoming histrionic." The Santa Fe New Mexican also praised the cover, writing: "Without a trace of irony he finds the soul of the song and makes it into the perfect hillbilly tribute to the ascended master from Minneapolis."

== Track listing ==
| No. | Title | Length |
|---|---|---|
| 1. | "What I Don't Know" | 2:52 |
| 2. | "Free to Go" | 3:49 |
| 3. | "Sad, Sad Music" | 3:16 |
| 4. | "These Arms" | 3:57 |
| 5. | "I Wouldn't Put It Past Me" | 3:38 |
| 6. | "Listen" | 4:25 |
| 7. | "Two Doors Down" | 4:17 |
| 8. | "Guitars, Cadillacs" | 3:21 |
| 9. | "Home for Sale" | 3:07 |
| 10. | "Please, Please Baby" | 2:43 |
| 11. | "Gone (That'll Be Me)" | 3:28 |
| 12. | "Purple Rain" | 4:42 |
