= Dwight Yoakam =

American country singer (born 1956)

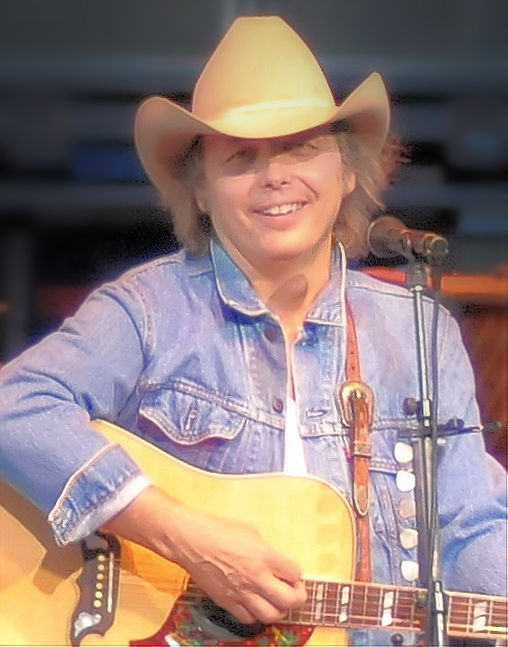
- Yoakam performing in San Diego, California, in 2008
- Born: Dwight David Yoakam; October 23, 1956 (age 70); Pikeville, Kentucky, U.S.
- Occupations: Singer; songwriter; actor; film director
- Years active: 1984–present
- Works: Filmography; Albums; Singles
- Spouse: Emily Joyce (m. 2020)
- Children: 1
- Awards: Full list
- Musical career
- Genres: Country; alternative country; Bakersfield sound
- Instruments: Vocals; acoustic guitar
- Labels: Oak; Reprise; Audium; New West; Warner; Sugar Hill; Via/Thirty Tigers
- Website: www.dwightyoakam.com

Dwight David Yoakam (born October 23, 1956) is an American singer-songwriter, actor, and filmmaker. He first achieved mainstream attention in 1986 with the release of his debut album Guitars, Cadillacs, Etc., Etc.. Yoakam had considerable success throughout the late 1980s onward, with a total of ten studio albums for Reprise Records. Later projects have been released on Audium (now MNRK Music Group), New West, Warner, Sugar Hill Records, and Thirty Tigers.

His first three albums—Guitars, Cadillacs, Etc., Etc., Hillbilly Deluxe, and Buenas Noches from a Lonely Room—all reached number one on the Top Country Albums chart published by Billboard. Yoakam also has two number-one singles on that publication's Hot Country Songs charts with "Streets of Bakersfield" (a duet with Buck Owens) and "I Sang Dixie", and twelve additional top-ten hits. He has won two Grammy Awards and one Academy of Country Music award. 1993's This Time is his most commercially successful album, having been certified triple-platinum by the Recording Industry Association of America (RIAA).

Yoakam's musical style draws from a wide variety of influences including alternative country, neotraditional country, honky-tonk, rock, and the Bakersfield sound. He is known for his distinctive tenor singing voice and unconventional image. Although he has a large number of songs written by himself, he has also recorded cover songs by a wide range of artists including Johnny Horton, Elvis Presley, Cheap Trick, the Blasters, Lefty Frizzell, and Queen. Artists with whom he has collaborated include Beck, John Mellencamp, k.d. lang, Ralph Stanley, and members of Alison Krauss & Union Station. His albums featured production and lead guitar work by Pete Anderson until the beginning of the 21st century.

As an actor, Yoakam has appeared in the movies Red Rock West, Sling Blade, Panic Room, and Wedding Crashers, as well as South of Heaven, West of Hell, which he wrote and directed. He also appeared in the TV series P.S. I Luv U and Under the Dome, as well as the Amazon Prime Video original series Goliath.

== Biography ==
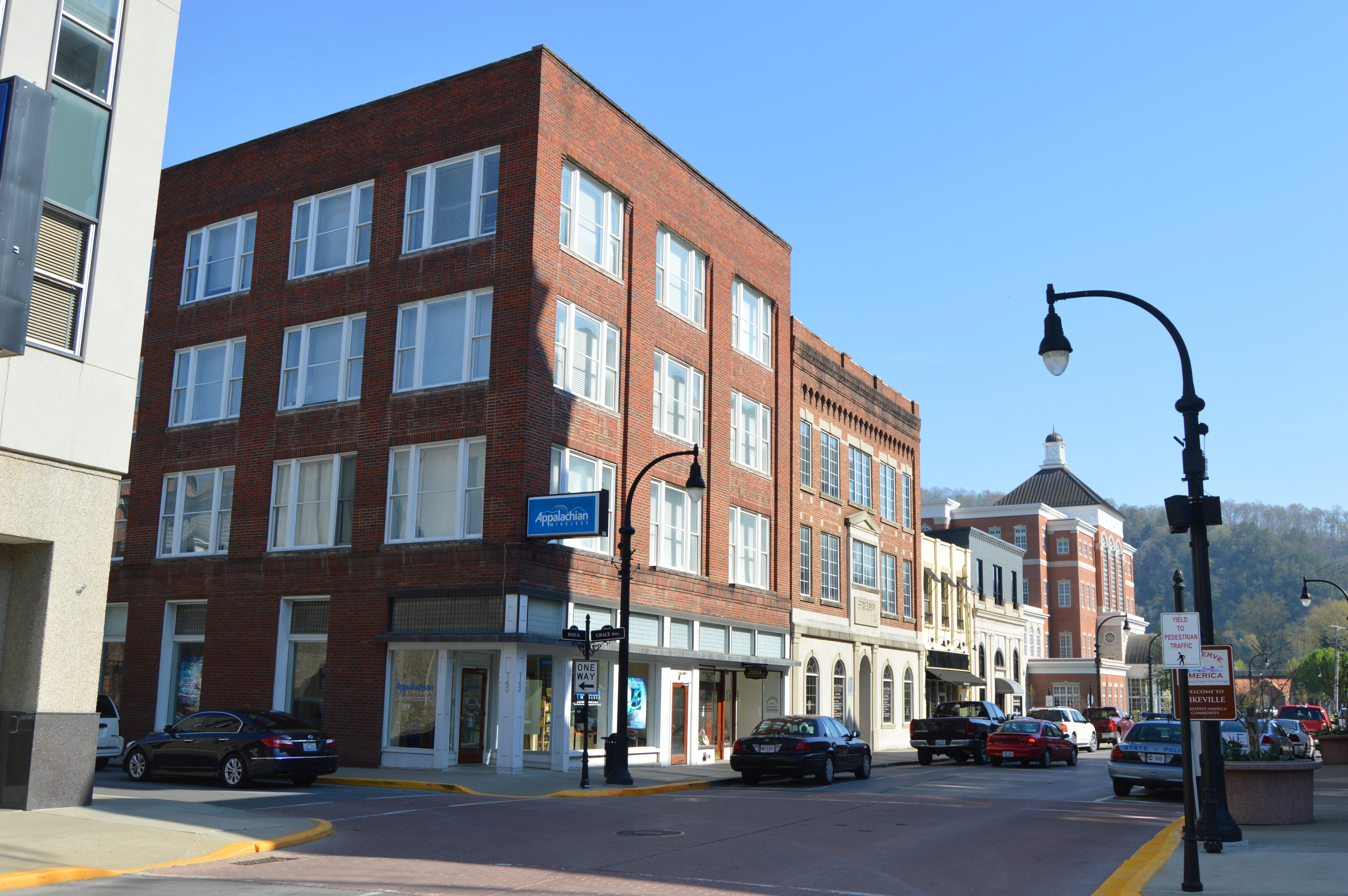
Dwight Yoakam was born in Pikeville, Kentucky.

Dwight David Yoakam was born October 23, 1956, in Pikeville, Kentucky. He is the eldest of three children to Ruth (née Tibbs) and David Yoakam. At the time of Yoakam's birth, his father was serving in the United States Army. After David Yoakam was discharged from the Army, the Yoakams moved to Columbus, Ohio. By this point, the couple had a second son named Ronald and a daughter named Kimberly. Meanwhile, David supported his family by working at a Westinghouse Electric Corporation factory and later by ownership of a Texaco gas station. Yoakam's father had acquired a guitar manufactured by the Kay Musical Instrument Company while in the Army, and gave it to Yoakam after being unable to learn to play it himself. Although Yoakam later broke this guitar, he received another one as a Christmas present while he was in the fourth grade. He also wrote his first song around this point. As a child, Yoakam took influence from the music that his parents listened to on records as well as WMNI, then an AM country music radio station in Columbus. Among these records were compilations by Johnny Cash and Johnny Horton. According to his mother, the family would also sing songs to each other when on road trips to visit Yoakam's maternal grandparents. Yoakam himself also stated that he was influenced by rock and roll acts he had seen on television, such as Elvis Presley.

The Yoakam family moved to another neighborhood of Columbus in 1968, where Yoakam attended Northland High School. His mother encouraged all three of her children to join the school's band, in which Yoakam played drums. He also attended drama class at Northland High School, which led to him playing the role of Charlie in a production of Flowers for Algernon. Yoakam later attributed this performance as giving him more confidence performing in front of others. In his senior year of high school, Yoakam and some classmates formed a rock and roll band to compete in the school's talent show. The band became popular enough that they began performing at a number of private parties throughout Columbus as The Greaser Band. Yoakam attended Ohio State University, but quickly dropped out in order to focus on his musical career. While playing at a club in Gahanna, Ohio, Yoakam was approached by a man who promised a musical contract but later turned out to be a con artist. Despite this, Yoakam chose to move to Nashville, Tennessee, to continue pursuing a career in country music. He faced difficulty in the Nashville music scene, as his style was more indebted to honky-tonk and bluegrass music at a time when such sounds were not popular compared to country pop and Nashville sound.

Yoakam then moved to Los Angeles, California, at the encouragement of Billy Alves, a former member of the Greaser Band. While he was initially unsuccessful there as well, he met guitarist and record producer Pete Anderson at a Los Angeles bar in 1982. The two became friends when they realized they had common interest in musicians such as Merle Haggard. Anderson also observed that cowpunk and alternative country were popular in California through acts such as Joe Ely, Rank and File, and Lone Justice. By performing at clubs where these acts also performed, Yoakam was thus able to gain further exposure.

== Musical career ==
=== 1984–1986: Guitars, Cadillacs, Etc., Etc. ===
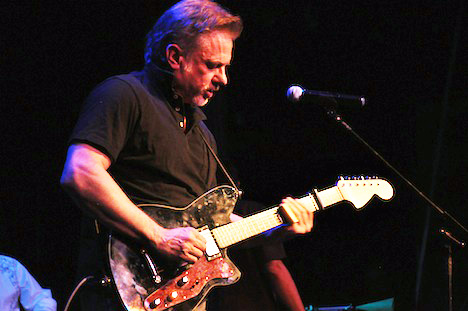
Pete Anderson produced and played lead guitar on the majority of Yoakam's albums.

By 1984, Yoakam had written a large number of songs, so Anderson encouraged him to record some of them on an extended play. Anderson also served as producer and lead guitarist on the project, roles he would serve throughout most of Yoakam's career. The EP was titled Guitars, Cadillacs, Etc., Etc. and was released through the Oak Records label. It consisted of five of Yoakam's original compositions, plus a cover of Johnny Cash's "Ring of Fire". Songs from the extended play received airplay on independent radio stations throughout Los Angeles. Later in the year Yoakam was chosen to serve as an opening act for the Blasters. This led to him being discovered by Reprise Records executive Paige Levy, who helped Yoakam sign with the label in 1986. Reprise re-issued Guitars, Cadillacs, Etc., Etc. that year with four more tracks, thus making it his debut album. One of the added tracks was "Bury Me", a duet with Maria McKee. The first single off the album was a cover of Johnny Horton's 1956 single "Honky Tonk Man". Yoakam's rendition of the song charted at number three on Billboard Hot Country Songs in mid-1986. The song was even more successful in Canada, reaching the number one position on that nation's country music charts then published by RPM. "Honky Tonk Man" also received a music video, which in 1986 became the first by a country artist to air on MTV. The album itself reached the number one position on Billboard Top Country Albums.

Two more singles followed, both of which Yoakam wrote himself. These were "Guitars, Cadillacs" and "It Won't Hurt", both of which made Hot Country Songs. Thirteen years after its release, Guitars, Cadillacs, Etc., Etc. was certified double platinum by the Recording Industry Association of America (RIAA), honoring shipments of two million copies in the United States. At the 29th Annual Grammy Awards in 1987, the album was nominated for Grammy Award for Best Male Country Vocal Performance and "Guitars, Cadillacs" was nominated for Best Country Song. The Country Music Association (CMA) also nominated Yoakam for the Horizon Award (now called Best New Artist) and "Honky Tonk Man" for Music Video of the Year. Yoakam also won Top New Male Vocalist at the 1986 Academy of Country Music (ACM) awards.

The album was reviewed favorably. Thom Jurek of AllMusic wrote of the album that it contained influences of Bob Dylan and Bakersfield sound. His review also noted the number of personal songs written by Yoakam himself, as well as the cover versions of "Ring of Fire" and Ray Price's "Heartaches by the Number". Ron Fell of Gavin Report compared Yoakam's musical image favorably to Buddy Holly and Bruce Springsteen while also stating that Yoakam had "an authenticity to his persona". Writing for the Rapid City Journal, Leonard Running noted the use of fiddle, steel guitar, and Dobro in the production.

=== 1987–1989: Hillbilly Deluxe, Buenas Noches from a Lonely Room, and Just Lookin' for a Hit ===
Yoakam's second Reprise album Hillbilly Deluxe was released in 1987. The album was also led off by a cover song; specifically, Elvis Presley's "Little Sister". After this were Yoakam's original compositions "Little Ways" and "Please, Please Baby", followed by a cover of Lefty Frizzell's "Always Late with Your Kisses". All four of these cuts made top ten on the country music charts between 1987 and early 1988. "Little Ways" was a number one single on the Canadian RPM country charts. Also covered on the album was Stonewall Jackson's "Smoke Along the Track". One of the other tracks on the album was "Readin', Rightin', Rt. 23", an autobiographical song which Yoakam wrote about the towns along U.S. Route 23 in Kentucky near his grandparents' houses. Hillbilly Deluxe was certified platinum for shipments of one million copies, and earned Yoakam another Grammy Award nomination in the category Best Male Country Vocal Performance. It also reached number one on Top Country Albums. Jurek praised the cover songs in his review for AllMusic, where he compared Yoakam's vocal phrasing favorably to Merle Haggard. He also noted the use of lap steel guitar and fiddle in Anderson's production, as well as Yoakam's lyrics on "Readin', Rightin', Rt. 23". An uncredited review in Music & Media magazine stated, "The album features sophisticated, yet fresh country music with rollicking C&W guitar lines, supplemented with Yoakam's straight, yearning vocals."

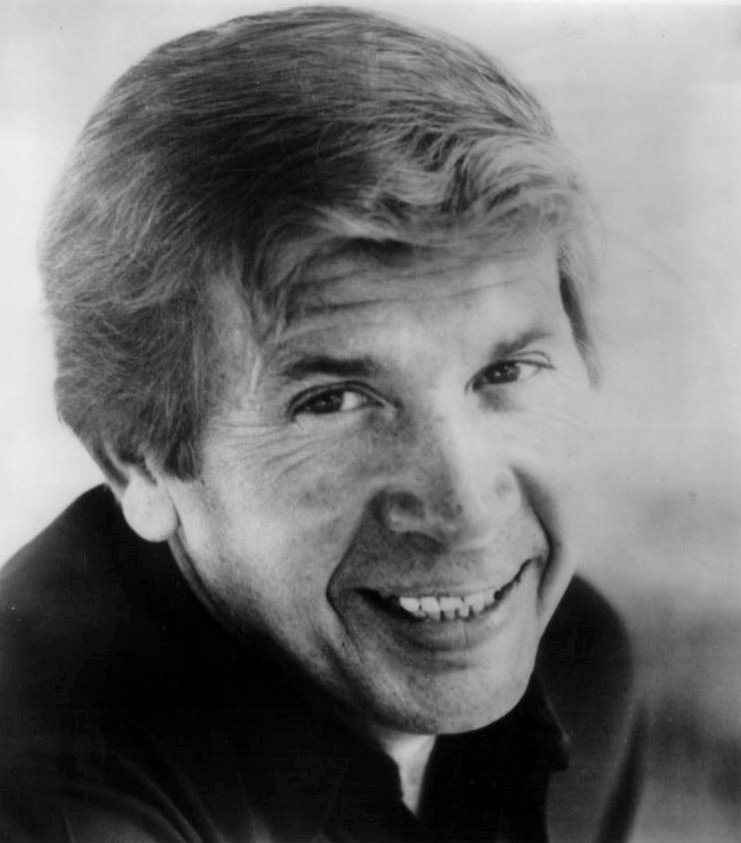
Yoakam had a number one single in 1988 with "Streets of Bakersfield", a duet with Buck Owens (pictured in 1977).

His third Reprise album was 1988's Buenas Noches from a Lonely Room. The album was his third and final to top the Billboard country albums chart. Its first two singles were also his only number one entries on Hot Country Songs, both peaking there in 1988. These were a cover of Buck Owens' "Streets of Bakersfield" which featured Owens on duet vocals, and "I Sang Dixie". Before "Streets of Bakersfield" was recorded for the album, Yoakam had contacted Owens (who was retired from performing at the time) and convinced him to sing the song on a television special for CBS. The commercial success of the studio version also led to Owens ending his retirement and re-signing with Capitol Records later in the decade. The third single from Buenas Noches from a Lonely Room was "I Got You"; while this song reached number five on the country charts, the album's title track failed to enter top 40. This album once again featured Maria McKee on backing vocals, along with accompaniment by Tejano accordionist Flaco Jiménez. Also covered on the album were Hank Locklin's "Send Me the Pillow You Dream On" and Johnny Cash's "Home of the Blues". Jurek thought that the album "shows the first signs of beginning to stretch out and be comfortable with his unique approach to hard honky tonk music, Bakersfield-style". Buenas Noches from a Lonely Room and "Streets of Bakersfield" were respectively nominated for Best Male Country Vocal Performance and Best Country Collaboration with Vocals at the 31st Annual Grammy Awards. The latter also received a CMA nomination for Vocal Event of the Year.

Yoakam ended the 1980s with his first greatest hits album, Just Lookin' for a Hit. The album consisted of eight previously released singles and two newly recorded cover songs. These were of the Blasters' "Long White Cadillac" and the Flying Burrito Brothers' "Sin City", the latter of which Yoakam recorded as a duet with k.d. lang. "Long White Cadillac" was issued as a single, reaching number 35 on the country music charts. The "Sin City" cover received a Grammy nomination for Best Country Vocal Collaboration.

=== 1990–1992: If There Was a Way and soundtrack contributions ===
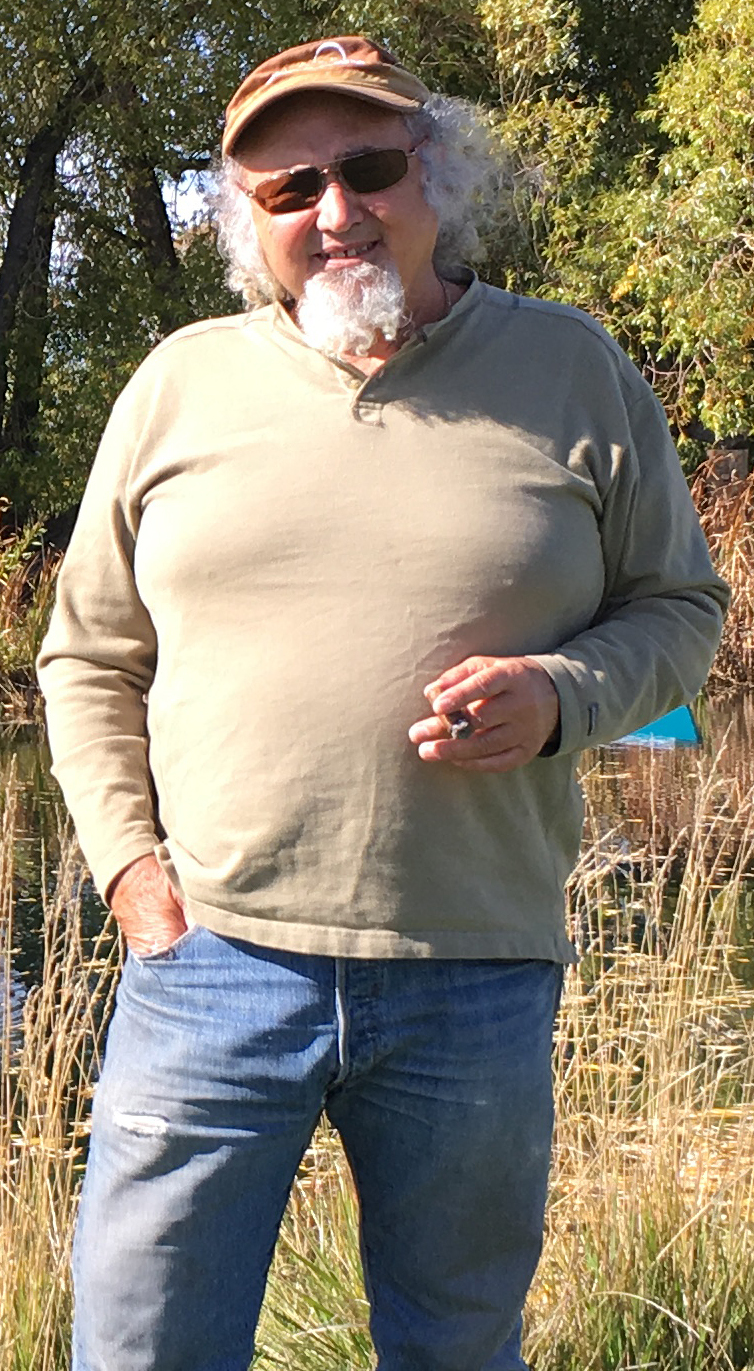
Kostas wrote several of Yoakam's singles in the 1990s.

In 1990, Yoakam entered the Billboard country charts for the thirteenth time with "Turn It On, Turn It Up, Turn Me Loose", which peaked at number eleven. This song led off his fourth studio album If There Was a Way. The album would account for five more singles between 1990 and 1992: "You're the One", "Nothing's Changed Here", "It Only Hurts When I Cry", "The Heart That You Own", and the Patty Loveless duet "Send a Message to My Heart". Of these, all except "Send a Message to My Heart" were top-20 country hits. "Turn It On, Turn It Up, Turn Me Loose" was also nominated for a Grammy Award for Best Male Country Vocal Performance, Yoakam's fourth nomination in that category.

Unlike his previous albums, Yoakam co-wrote several tracks on If There Was a Way with other writers. He wrote with Roger Miller on "It Only Hurts When I Cry", a song to which Miller also contributed backing vocals. Yoakam had met Miller at the Grammy Awards and presented him with the title, and Miller agreed to co-write the song after Yoakam stated he was a fan of Miller's music. "Turn It On, Turn It Up, Turn Me Loose" was one of the first successful cuts for Greek-American songwriter Kostas. Record producer Tony Brown had sent Kostas' demo of the song to Pete Anderson because he thought the song sounded like Yoakam had written it. Because of this, Anderson suggested that Yoakam begin writing songs with Kostas. The two co-wrote both "Nothing's Changed Here" and "Send a Message to My Heart" on If There Was a Way, leading to further collaborations on subsequent albums. Yoakam had written "You're the One" in 1978 about a woman with whom he had ended a relationship. In addition to Roger Miller, backing vocals on the album included Amy Ray (of the Indigo Girls) and bluegrass musician Tim O'Brien. Alanna Nash of Entertainment Weekly rated the album "A", stating that it continued on the "hillbilly" themes of his previous albums while also containing more rock and roll influence than its predecessors. Jurek praised the album for rock influences as well, particularly the cover of "Let's Work Together".

Yoakam contributed to two movie soundtracks in 1992. First, he cut two songs for Falling from Grace, the 1992 directorial debut of rock singer John Mellencamp. Yoakam performed Mellencamp's composition "Common Day Man"; the two also joined Joe Ely, John Prine, and James McMurtry on the track "Sweet Suzanne". Credited to Buzzin' Cousins, this song charted on Hot Country Songs for five weeks in early 1992. It also accounted for Yoakam's second CMA nomination in the category of Vocal Event of the Year. Later in the year, Yoakam covered Elvis Presley's "Suspicious Minds" for the soundtrack of Honeymoon in Vegas. This rendition charted on Hot Country Songs by year's end. In addition to these, he re-recorded "Miner's Prayer", a track from Guitars, Cadillacs, Etc., Etc., as a duet with bluegrass singer Ralph Stanley on the latter's 1992 album Saturday Night & Sunday Morning. This track was nominated for a Grammy award for Best Country Vocal Collaboration. Finally, Yoakam released an album titled La Croix d'Amour for the European market in 1992. This consisted mainly of selections from other albums, as well as previously unreleased cover songs.

=== 1993–1996: This Time, Dwight Live, and Gone ===
For his next studio album, 1993's This Time, Yoakam wrote either by himself or in collaboration with Kostas. The only exception was the album's lead single "Ain't That Lonely Yet", which Kostas co-wrote with James House. This song peaked at number two on the Billboard country charts, while also topping the American Radio & Records country music charts and Canadian RPM country charts. It won Yoakam the Grammy Award for Best Male Country Vocal Performance in 1993, his first win from that association. This Time charted four more singles between 1993 and 1994. First were "A Thousand Miles from Nowhere" and "Fast as You", which both achieved peaks of number two as well. The latter also became Yoakam's first entry on the Billboard Hot 100, peaking at 70. After these were "Try Not to Look So Pretty" and "Pocket of a Clown", which were less successful on the charts. Of the album, Anderson told Gavin Report that "It's really the first record we've made where we just took all the boundaries down", while Yoakam himself said that "I felt that my musical statements on the preceding albums were valid, but that they were complete statements and there was no need to further articulate them. It was time to allow my music latitude." He cited the track "Home for Sale" as an example, describing it as a "stone country" lyric backed by a Hammond organ, an instrument not commonly used in country. Jurek noted influences of doo-wop in "Pocket of a Clown" and of Roy Orbison in "Ain't That Lonely Yet". In July 1994, Yoakam began the This Time Tour, a 75-city tour which featured Alison Krauss and Union Station as an opening act. The Country Music Association nominated "Ain't That Lonely Yet" for Single of the Year in 1993, and Yoakam himself in the category Male Vocalist of the Year in 1994. The album achieved his highest RIAA certification, for triple-platinum in 1996.

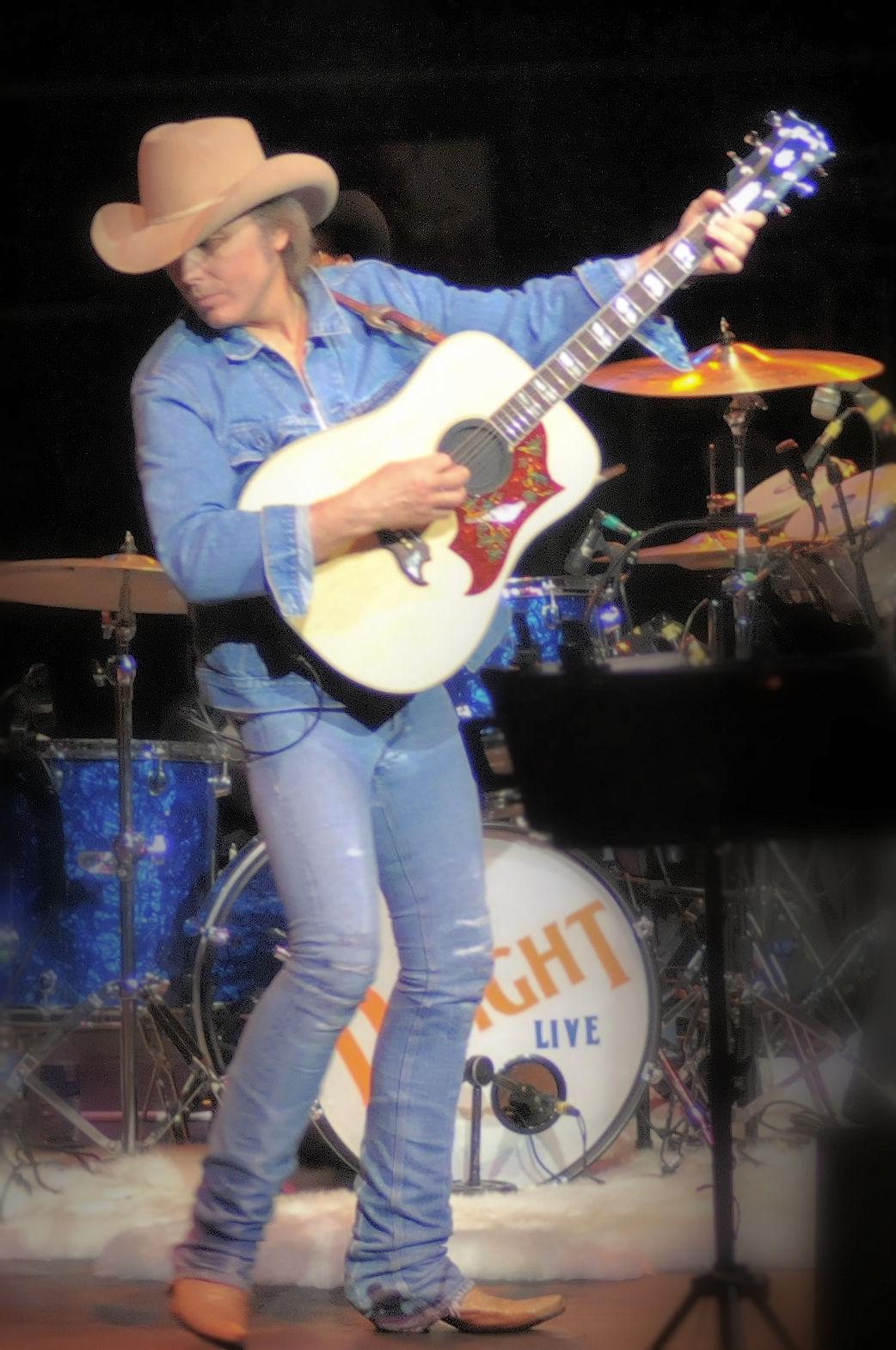
Yoakam performing in 2008.

Yoakam released two albums in 1995. The first was Dwight Live, a live album recorded in July 1994 in San Francisco. Stephen Thomas Erlewine wrote of this album that "nothing on the album improves on the original recorded versions", while Tony Scherman of Entertainment Weekly thought the album was "beautifully paced" and showed Yoakam's strengths as a vocalist. The album was certified gold in 1996. His other release for 1995 was the studio album Gone. Yoakam wrote the entire album, collaborating with Kostas on two songs. Among the backing vocalists were Carl Jackson, Jim Lauderdale, Joy Lynn White, and The Rembrandts. "Nothing", one of the collaborations with Kostas, was selected as the lead single and charted at number 20 on Hot Country Songs in 1995. The song's B-side "Gone (That'll Be Me)" and "Sorry You Asked?" were released as singles as well, though neither reached top 40. Jurek thought that individual tracks displayed influences of rhythm and blues, mariachi, Tejano music, and psychedelic rock. Jeffrey B. Remz of Country Standard Time wrote that Gone was "a critically received album, which did not do boffo numbers because Yoakam received very little airplay for what was probably his most musically diverse album. And in some parts of the country, his tour did not draw crowds either."

=== 1997–1998: Under the Covers, Come On Christmas, A Long Way Home ===
Yoakam's next release for Reprise was 1997's Under the Covers, an album composed entirely of cover songs. Yoakam and Anderson had begun recording songs for this project prior to Gone, while other selections previously appeared on La Croix d'Amour. The project accounted for only one single in a rendition of the Everly Brothers' "Claudette". Bluegrass musician Ralph Stanley played banjo on a cover of The Clash's "Train in Vain", while Sheryl Crow sang duet vocals on a cover of Sonny & Cher's "Baby Don't Go". Jurek wrote of this album, "While this set is not perfect, it's still damn fine and warrants repeated listens to come to grips with Yoakam's visionary ambition." Remz praised the covers of Glen Campbell's "Wichita Lineman" and "Train in Vain" in particular, but criticized the cover of The Beatles' "Things We Said Today". After this was an album of Christmas music titled Come On Christmas, released later in the year. Yoakam wrote the title track and "Santa Can't Stay", while the rest of the album largely consisted of traditional Christmas songs such as "Away in a Manger" and "Silver Bells". Thom Owens of AllMusic wrote that the album contained "high-spirited, entertaining country-rockers that may not add anything new to Yoakam's catalog, but they make the record an enjoyable holiday album."

Between 1995 and 1997, Yoakam received three consecutive Grammy nominations in the category of Best Male Country Vocal Performance. The songs nominated in this category were "Pocket of a Clown", "A Thousand Miles from Nowhere", and "Nothing". He also received three consecutive nominations for Best Country Album between 1996 and 1998, with the nominations going to Dwight Live, Gone, and Under the Covers. After these was his next studio album of original content, 1998's A Long Way Home. Yoakam wrote the entire project by himself, making it his first not to have any co-writers or cover songs. The album charted two singles in "Things Change" and "These Arms". This album also featured Ralph Stanley, this time as a duet partner on "Traveler's Lantern". Brian Steinberg of Country Standard Time thought that the album was "back to basics" and comparable to Yoakam's releases in the 1980s, stating that "This isn't Yoakam's most innovative work, but it contains enough moments to make it worth attention." Also in 1998, Yoakam funded a charity album for release on Little Dog Records, a label which his then-producer and guitarist Pete Anderson owned. This album was titled Will Sing for Food and featured other artists recording renditions of Yoakam's songs. Among the artists contributing were Sara Evans, Mandy Barnett, Kim Richey, Gillian Welch, and David Ball. Nash contrasted these two albums in a double review, calling A Long Way Home "a fresh, dynamic set, updating his trademark Bakersfield-does-L.A. sound without sacrificing his honky-tonk roots" while stating that Will Sing for Food had "stunningly original interpretations". Steinberg gave the latter a mixed review, praising the contributions of Bonnie Bramlett and Scott Joss while considering other cuts on the album too similar in sound to Yoakam's originals.

=== 1998–1999: Last Chance for a Thousand Years: Dwight Yoakam's Greatest Hits from the 90's ===
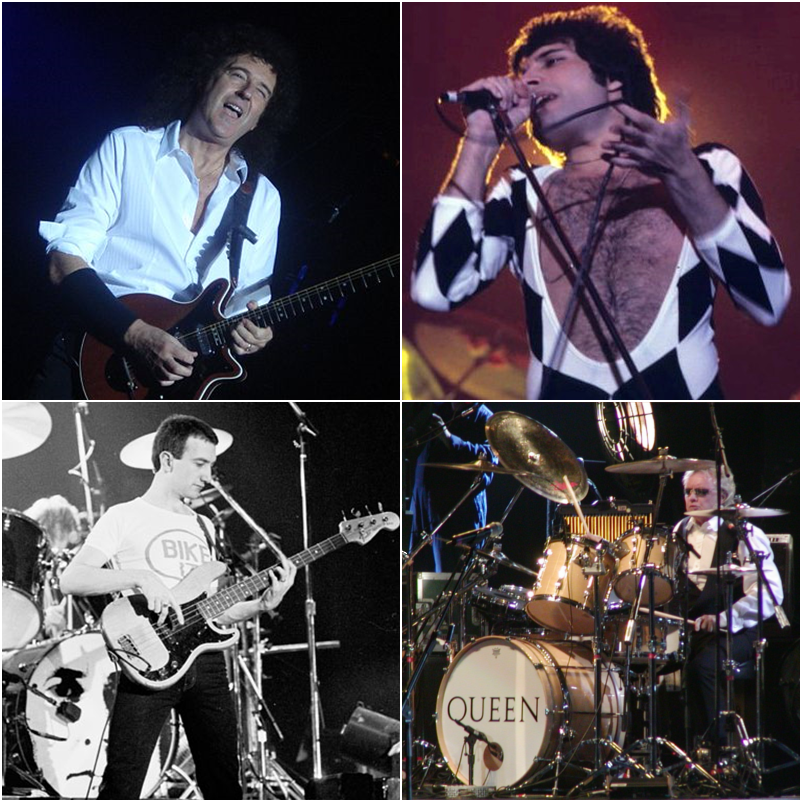
Yoakam had a hit in 1999 with a cover of Queen's "Crazy Little Thing Called Love".

In 1998, Columbia Records released A Tribute to Tradition, a multi-artist tribute album to 1960s and 1970s country music. Yoakam was one of several artists featured on the album's closing track "Same Old Train", an original composition by Marty Stuart. The track featured twelve other country musicians, including Earl Scruggs, Merle Haggard, Clint Black, and Randy Travis. It charted for five weeks on Hot Country Songs in late 1998. The song won Grammy Award for Best Country Collaboration with Vocals at the 41st Annual Grammy Awards, thus giving Yoakam his second win from the organization. It was also nominated for CMA Vocal Event of the Year.

Yoakam ended the decade with his second greatest-hits package, Last Chance for a Thousand Years: Dwight Yoakam's Greatest Hits from the 90's. In addition to tracks from his 1990s Reprise albums, the compilation included three new songs. These were covers of Queen's "Crazy Little Thing Called Love" and Waylon Jennings' "I'll Go Back to Her" and the new song "Thinking About Leaving", which Yoakam wrote with Rodney Crowell. The cover of "Crazy Little Thing Called Love" served as the album's lead single, peaking at 12 on the country charts and 64 on the Hot 100. It was also his final number one on the Canadian country music charts published by RPM before that publication closed in 2000. "Thinking About Leaving" was also issued as a single, but did not enter the country music top 40. In 2000, "Crazy Little Thing Called Love" was nominated for a Grammy Award for Best Male Country Vocal Performance.

=== 2000–2001: dwightyoakamacoustic.net and Tomorrow's Sounds Today ===
Yoakam's tenure with Reprise Records ended with a pair of albums both released in 2000. The first was dwightyoakamacoustic.net, composed entirely of acoustic recordings with just Yoakam's vocal and acoustic guitar. The only exception was a re-recording of "Guitars, Cadillacs", which Yoakam performed a cappella. Yoakam said that he was inspired to do such an album due to the success of similar acoustic renditions in his concerts. He had originally planned to release the album through his website until representatives of Reprise Records thought the album had sales potential. The album itself had minimalistic packaging as well, consisting solely of a sticker with the album's name on the front of an otherwise-clear CD case. Steve Huey of AllMusic thought that the album's minimalism allowed a greater focus on Yoakam's vocal interpretation than previous albums.

His other release in 2000 was Tomorrow's Sounds Today. The album accounted for two charted singles in "What Do You Know About Love" and a cover of Cheap Trick's "I Want You to Want Me". Yoakam co-wrote with Buck Owens on three tracks: "The Sad Side of Town", "Alright, I'm Wrong", and "I Was There", the latter two of which were also recorded as duets with him. Although the two had previously sung together on "Streets of Bakersfield", Owens rejected further collaborations throughout the 1990s as he considered Yoakam "too young", but ultimately agreed to collaborate again when the two met at a concert in 1999. Writing for AllMusic, Hal Horowitz thought the Owens collaborations showed Yoakam's continued influence of the Bakersfield sound of which Owens was a part. He also praised the guitar work of Pete Anderson and compared Yoakam's lyrical style to that of Hank Williams. Scherman was less favorable, considering the material "forgettable" despite describing Anderson's guitar work with favor. Yoakam received his final CMA nomination in 2001, when that institution nominated "Alright, I'm Wrong" for Vocal Event of the Year. At the end of his contract with Reprise, parent company Warner Records issued a box set album titled Reprise Please Baby: The Warner Bros. Years. The package consisted of 89 tracks from Yoakam's Reprise catalog, including previously unreleased songs and early demos. Also included was a duet with Kelly Willis on a cover of George Jones and Tammy Wynette's "Golden Ring".

=== 2002–2004: Population Me and compilations ===
Yoakam spent much of 2001 and 2002 touring with Brooks & Dunn. He also founded a new record label called Electrodisc after his contract with Reprise expired. The label partnered with Audium Records (now MNRK Music Group) for distribution. His first Audium release was 2003's Population Me. This album charted two singles, both of which were covers: Gregg Henry's "The Back of Your Hand" and Mike Stinson's "The Late Great Golden State". Also covered on this album was Burt Bacharach's "Trains and Boats and Planes". Timothy B. Schmit provided backing vocals on "The Late Great Golden State", while Willie Nelson sang duet vocals on "If Teardrops Were Diamonds". Jurek found influences of Jackson Browne, the Eagles, and Chuck Berry in the album's sound. Messinger wrote of the album that "the complex, innovative sound he and Anderson have developed certainly merits repeated exploration."

Between 2003 and 2004, Yoakam released three more compilations of covers albums to fulfill contractual obligations with his labels. The first was 2003's In Others' Words on Reprise. This consisted entirely of cover songs mostly from movie soundtracks and tribute albums to which Yoakam contributed. The oldest track was a cover of the Grateful Dead's "Truckin'", which Yoakam cut in 1991. Jurek wrote that the compilation was "far from a stellar set but does fill in the gaps nicely." Rhino Records released a greatest-hits package titled The Very Best of Dwight Yoakam in 2004. This compilation was certified gold after its release. Erlewine thought that while the album did not contain many of his earlier songs, it otherwise showed the range of his styles and would have potential appeal to fans who preferred his more rock-influenced cuts such as the covers of "Crazy Little Thing Called Love" and "I Want You to Want Me". His third and final compilation was Dwight's Used Records on Audium also in 2004. Among the collaborators on this project were Heather Myles, Deana Carter, and the Nitty Gritty Dirt Band. Artists covered included John Prine's "Paradise", ZZ Top's "I'm Bad, I'm Nationwide", and Johnny Cash's "Understand Your Man". Country Standard Time writer Eli Messinger thought that, by drawing from a decade's worth of material, the album showed new variety in Yoakam's style over his traditional studio albums.

=== 2005–2007: Blame the Vain and Dwight Sings Buck ===
In 2005, Yoakam signed with New West Records, an Americana music label based out of California. His first release for the label was 2005's Blame the Vain. It was also Yoakam's first credit as a producer, as he had ended his relationship with Pete Anderson in 2004. At the time, former RCA Records artist Keith Gattis had taken over as Yoakam's guitarist and bandleader. Yoakam said that he had contacted a number of producers until Gattis encouraged him to produce by himself. New West partnered with Columbia Records to release two singles to radio. These were "Intentional Heartache" and the title track, which both made the lower regions of the country charts in 2005 and accounted for Yoakam's last appearance there. In the book Dwight Yoakam: A Thousand Miles from Nowhere, Don McLeese thought that Anderson's absence gave the album "an unbridled lack of restraint", citing the hard rock sound and spoken-word coda of "Intentional Heartache" as examples. Ray Waddell of Billboard also noted a "hard-charging" sound to the album, comparing various tracks to Elvis Presley. Rhino Records re-issued Guitars, Cadillacs, Etc, Etc. in 2006 to honor the album's 20th anniversary. This re-issue included previously unreleased demos and live tracks, along with liner notes written by Yoakam.

After Buck Owens' death in 2006, Yoakam began performing covers of his songs in concert. This culminated in his 2007 album Dwight Sings Buck, composed entirely of Owens covers. Yoakam recorded the project with his touring band, which at the time included then-former Mavericks member Eddie Perez on lead guitar. Yoakam stated that he and the band listened to Owens' originals to draw inspiration from the recordings. Among the songs chosen were "Act Naturally", "Crying Time", and "Close Up the Honky Tonks", the last of which served as the lead single. A review in AllMusic was favorable, stating that "He doesn't set out to imitate Owens' style or delivery, but he does capture the essence of each song, playing them as Buck intended: no frills, no foolin' around".

=== 2008–2016: 3 Pears, Second Hand Heart, and Swimmin' Pools, Movie Stars... ===
Yoakam performed at the CMA Music Festival in Nashville, Tennessee, in 2008, where he was joined by Faith Hill. This was Yoakam's first appearance at the event in over 20 years. He otherwise performed very few concerts in 2009 and 2010, citing the Great Recession and the rise of digital music distribution as a reason behind the slower pace of his career at the time. Despite this, he still stated that he planned to continue releasing albums. In July 2011, he re-signed with Warner for his next album, 2012's 3 Pears. The album included production from rock musician Beck on two tracks. Upon release, it became Yoakam's highest entry on the Billboard 200 albums chart, reaching number 18. Mikael Wood of the Los Angeles Times thought the album displayed a "softer side" than Yoakam's previous efforts. Stephen Thomas Erlewine wrote of the album, "Yoakam has surprised by digging deeper into every one of his obsessions, creating a record that captures the careening, adventurous spirit of the '60s without ever feeling doggedly retro. It's as fresh as any music he's ever made, and one of his very best albums."

His next Warner album was 2015's Second Hand Heart. It reached the number two position on Top Country Albums after its release, his highest peak on that chart since Buenas Noches from a Lonely Room in 1988. It consisted almost entirely of original songs written by Yoakam, except a cover of the standard "Man of Constant Sorrow" and Anthony Crawford's "V's of Birds". Erlewine found influences of The Beatles, Buck Owens, and cowpunk in the album's arrangements. Ann Powers of NPR's First Listen shared a similar opinion of the album, also praising the "brightness" of its sound.

In 2016 Yoakam was contacted by a label executive of Sugar Hill Records, who wanted him to record a bluegrass music album for them. This album, Swimmin' Pools, Movie Stars..., was released that same year. It mostly comprises re-recordings of previous songs in his career, including "Guitars, Cadillacs" and "Please, Please Baby". Yoakam co-produced with Jon Randall and Gary Paczosa. The album included musical accompaniment by Alison Krauss & Union Station members Adam Steffey and Barry Bales on mandolin and upright bass respectively. Also contributing were guitarist Bryan Sutton, fiddler Stuart Duncan, and banjoist Scott Vestal. In addition to his own material, Yoakam covered Prince's "Purple Rain". Yoakam chose to cover the song the day Prince died, as he had seen the news of the musician's death on television prior to recording. Chuck Dauphin of Sounds Like Nashville thought the album brought out the bluegrass influences already present in such songs as "What I Don't Know". Deming called the album "a stylistic detour for Dwight Yoakam, but its execution sums up many of his greatest strengths as an artist". Also in 2016, Yoakam released covers of The Monkees' "Tomorrow's Gonna Be Another Day" and Johnny Rivers' "Mountain of Love" on limited edition vinyl through Third Man Records, a label owned by Jack White.

=== 2017–present: Bakersfield Beat and Brighter Days ===
In 2017, Yoakam covered "Wichita Lineman" at a tribute ceremony to songwriter Jimmy Webb held at Carnegie Hall. In 2018, Yoakam was selected by SiriusXM satellite radio to curate his own show, Bakersfield Beat, on that company's Prime Country channel. The success of this led to Yoakam receiving his own channel also named Bakersfield Beat, in which he plays his own songs as well as those in the genres of Bakersfield sound, cowpunk, and country rock. In 2022, he started the LSD Tour with Lucinda Williams and Steve Earle. He also performed a concert with Old Crow Medicine Show in 2022 to honor the 30th anniversary of Hillbilly Deluxe.

Yoakam announced in November 2024 the release of his first studio album in nine years, Brighter Days. The album is his first for Via Records/Thirty Tigers and it includes the single "I'll Pay the Price". Also released in advance of the album was a duet with Post Malone titled "I Don't Know How to Say Goodbye (Bang Bang Boom Boom)". The project, produced by Yoakam, also includes covers of Cake's "Bound Away" and the Byrds's "Time Between".

== Acting ==
Yoakam holds several acting roles in both film and television. One of his first was a recurring role in the 1991 CBS crime drama P.S. I Luv U. He also had a role in the 1993 movie Red Rock West. In 1994, Yoakam portrayed rancher Mac Brazel in the made-for-TV movie Roswell. In 1996, actor-director Billy Bob Thornton cast Yoakam as the character Doyle Hargraves in the film Sling Blade. Yoakam had been recommended the role by his manager, and told the website Country Daily in 2016 that Sling Blade was the first role in his acting career which he thought would have a lasting impact. Yoakam and the rest of the film's cast were nominated in 1997 for a Screen Actors Guild Award for Outstanding Performance by a Cast in a Motion Picture. He appeared in the 1998 Richard Linklater film The Newton Boys, and wrote most of the songs for his album A Long Way Home at this film's shooting locations throughout Austin, Texas. In 1999, Yoakam and Sheryl Crow appeared in the thriller The Minus Man.

A year later he co-wrote, directed, and starred in a Western film titled South of Heaven, West of Hell. He also composed a soundtrack of the same name. The movie was a financial failure, leading to many of its crew members filing claims against Yoakam in small claims court. In addition, Yoakam fired Pete Anderson from his touring band in 2002 as a means of recouping the finances lost by this movie. Zac Johnson of AllMusic criticized the soundtrack for including snippets of film dialogue between tracks, although he praised the individual songs and their inclusion of collaborators such as Bekka Bramlett, Mick Jagger, and Billy Gibbons.

In 2002, Yoakam had a role in the David Fincher movie Panic Room. Before the movie's release, he told the Associated Press that he did not consider acting significantly different from recording music because both roles were "fragmented" and required "repetition of performance". Between 2005 and 2006, he also appeared in the movies Bandidas, The Three Burials of Melquiades Estrada, and Wedding Crashers. In 2008, he appeared in Four Christmases as Pastor Phil. In 2014, Yoakam had a recurring role in season two of the CBS science fiction series Under the Dome. He also reunited with Thornton for season one of the Amazon Prime Video original series Goliath.

== Musical styles and influences ==
Yoakam's style is defined by a variety of influences both inside and outside country music. These influences include rockabilly, honky-tonk, neotraditional country, Bakersfield sound, and country rock. Colin Larkin wrote in The Virgin Encyclopedia of Country Music that Yoakam's music showed influences of "the honky-tonk country music of Buck Owens and Lefty Frizzell" and "a distinct antipathy toward the Nashville pop/country scene." Stephen Thomas Erlewine of AllMusic stated that "With his stripped-down approach to traditional honky tonk and Bakersfield country, Dwight Yoakam helped return country music to its roots in the late '80s." Erlewine also noted that Yoakam's fanbase typically consisted of people who listened to roots rock and rock and roll. Thom Jurek of AllMusic thought that Pete Anderson's electric guitar work was also an important part of his sound, comparing such work to Don Rich of Buck Owens' backing band The Buckaroos. Jurek also thought that the prominent uses of electric guitar and Hammond organ were examples of Yoakam's rock influences.

Yoakam describes his own songwriting style as "fragmented". He told Al Caudell of American Songwriter that he usually wrote songs by coming up with a melody and then determining the intended mood. From there, he said he would come up with a "thesis" for the song. He also stated that he preferred not to write in a linear fashion, as he thought writing a song in one sitting would cause him to feel creatively burnt out. He also said that memories of his childhood were influential in his songwriting style, particularly in the bluegrass music to which he listened; he told American Songwriter that he enjoyed the "irony that's always been part of bluegrass in that it sets melodic, lilting melodies and upbeat tempos with the most tragic lyrics."

Cyndi Hoelzle of Gavin Report noted Yoakam's appeal outside traditional country music, stating in 1993 that "[h]is records sold across the board-to middle-aged Stonewall Jackson fans and to young punk rockers who'd seen Dwight do his thing in L.A., opening shows for Los Lobos and the Violent Femmes." Richard Cromelin of The Los Angeles Times noted that Yoakam's musical image was that of a "brooding, intensely private figure driven by restless ambition and an edgy intellectuality more commonly found in rock stars." In the same article, Yoakam stated that "I found out early that one of the ways I was able to make contact was through musical expression." Similarly, he told Gavin Report in 1993 that "My nature is to be absolutely dissectively analytic. But with songwriting I have to leave it in a place that's not." Al Caudell of American Songwriter called Yoakam "a bluntly outspoken advocate of hardcore honky-tonk music". Yoakam received negative attention from the Nashville music scene early in his career due to his constant criticism of the genre. Among his criticisms were Columbia Records dropping Johnny Cash and MTV refusing to play country music videos. Of these criticisms, he later stated that "I learned a couple albums in ... that my opinions and observations on the industry were not pertinent to what I needed to do as an artist, so I just really began to focus solely on what I was doing at the time."

Yoakam's musical image is also defined by his typical outfits when onstage. Colin Larkin of The Virgin Encyclopedia of Country Music wrote that "like Don Williams and others, he retains the traditional Stetson hat." Alanna Nash wrote in a review of If There Was a Way that "When Dwight Yoakam first came on the scene, with his hip retro-attitude, concha-studded jeans, and music that often grazed the edge of rock & roll, it was hard to tell whether the California cowboy was for real. The verdict was clear by his third album, Buenas Noches from a Lonely Room, whose key cycle of songs is a classic murder tale that echoes the pride, heartbreak, betrayal, and vengeance of the age-old hillbilly experience." Al Caudell of American Songwriter noted that Yoakam frequently wore "ripped jeans". Darryl Smyers of the Dallas Observer wrote that "With his absurdly large hat and Flying Burrito Brothers fashion sense, Yoakam was championed by a surprising mix of punks, rockabilly hounds, and hard-core honky-tonkers."

Leonard Running of the Rapid City Journal referred to Yoakam's singing style as a "plaintive, yodel-edged voice". An uncredited review of Gone in No Depression stated, "His voice is pure and sweet, but a precise tool. Only rarely, like on 'Try Not to Look So Pretty' ... does it really fall down into an emotional fit." J. D. Considine of The Baltimore Sun wrote of Yoakam's singing voice that it was a "high, lonesome twang" and a "sweetly nasal tenor". Similarly, the editors of The Encyclopedia of Country Music described Yoakam as having a "twangy tenor... simply too spellbinding for country radio to ignore." These editors also thought that Yoakam was more able to break through into mainstream country music than contemporaries such as Lyle Lovett and Steve Earle because "mainstream country has found it easier to digest distorted guitars than ironic lyrics".

== Personal life ==
In 1992, Yoakam began dating actress Sharon Stone. He appeared alongside her at that year's Academy Awards ceremony. This encounter led to both of them receiving media attention from tabloids, along with rumors from fans that songs on This Time were about Stone. Yoakam denied these rumors and stated that the two dated for five weeks. Yoakam met MTV personality Karen Duffy at a party in 1994 and began dating soon afterward. The two ended their relationship in 1996. Yoakam married Emily Joyce on May 4, 2020, in Santa Monica, California. Because their wedding occurred during the COVID-19 pandemic, only ten guests were in attendance. The couple had their first child on August 16, 2020.

=== Legal issues ===
After a long tenure as Yoakam's bandleader and producer, Pete Anderson filed a lawsuit against him in 2004, stating that he had breached an oral contract by failing to perform a number of concert dates in mid-2002. The lawsuit claimed that by failing to perform these concerts, Yoakam had cost Anderson over $44,000 in salary. Yoakam and Anderson settled the lawsuit out of court, with the former stating that some of the financial issues stemming from these concerts were due to money lost in the commercial failure of South of Heaven, West of Hell. This financial dispute also ended the two's musical partnership, with Anderson saying that Yoakam "didn't want [him] around anymore". Anderson said in a 2011 interview with Style Weekly that he still respected Yoakam's artistry but had no intention of working with him again.

Yoakam filed a lawsuit against Warner Music in 2021 when the label withdrew several of his songs from streaming services due to expiration of contract. He claimed that the label was denying his reclamation of copyright toward the songs. The dispute was resolved in February 2022 and the songs re-appeared on streaming services soon afterward.

== Discography ==
=== Studio albums ===
- Guitars, Cadillacs, Etc., Etc. (1986)
- Hillbilly Deluxe (1987)
- Buenas Noches from a Lonely Room (1988)
- If There Was a Way (1990)
- This Time (1993)
- Gone (1995)
- A Long Way Home (1998)
- dwightyoakamacoustic.net (2000)
- Tomorrow's Sounds Today (2000)
- South of Heaven, West of Hell (2001, soundtrack)
- Population Me (2003)
- Blame the Vain (2005)
- 3 Pears (2012)
- Second Hand Heart (2015)
- Swimmin' Pools, Movie Stars... (2016)
- Brighter Days (2024)

=== Cover albums ===
- Under the Covers (1997)
- Come On Christmas (1997)
- In Others' Words (2003)
- Dwight's Used Records (2004)
- Dwight Sings Buck (2007)

=== Live albums ===
- Dwight Live (1995)
- Live from Austin TX (2005)

=== Compilation albums ===
- Just Lookin' for a Hit (1989)
- La Croix D'Amour (1992)
- Last Chance for a Thousand Years (1999)
- Reprise Please Baby: The Warner Bros. Years (2002)
- The Very Best of Dwight Yoakam (2004)

== Awards and nominations ==
Yoakam has won two Grammy Awards and one Academy of Country Music award.
