= Billboard year-end top 50 country & western singles of 1959 =

1959 Billboard magazine's ranking list

This is a list of Billboard magazine's ranking of the year's top country and western singles of 1959.

Johnny Horton's "The Battle of New Orleans" ranked as the year's No. 1 country and western record. It was released in April 1959, spent 10 weeks at the No. 1 spot, and remained on Billboard's country and western chart for 21 weeks. It was also the No. 1 record of 1961 on the year-end pop chart.

"The Three Bells" by The Browns ranked No. 2 on the year-end country and western chart. It also ranked No. 7 on the year-end pop chart.

"Waterloo" by Stonewall Jackson was another cross-over hit, finishing at No. 4 on the year-end country chart and No. 32 on the year-end pop chart.

Columbia Records led all of the labels with 16 records on the year-end chart. RCA Victor followed with eight records on the chart. Decca was third with seven records.

Rank	Peak (Note: This column recites the record's peak position on Billboard's weekly charts.)	Title	Artist(s)	Label
1	1	"The Battle of New Orleans"	Johnny Horton	Columbia
2	1	"The Three Bells"	The Browns	RCA Victor
3	2	"Heartaches by the Number"	Ray Price	Columbia
4	1	"Waterloo"	Stonewall Jackson	Columbia
5	1	"Don't Take Your Guns to Town"	Johnny Cash	Columbia
6	1	"White Lightning"	George Jones	Mercury
7	1	"Country Girl"	Faron Young	Capitol
8	2	"I Ain't Never"	Webb Pierce	Decca
9	1	"When It's Springtime in Alaska (It's Forty Below)"	Johnny Horton	Columbia
10	1	"Billy Bayou"	Jim Reeves	RCA Victor
11	2	"Home"	Jim Reeves	RCA Victor
12	4	"Big Midnight Special"	Wilma Lee & Stoney Cooper	Hickory
13	3	"I'm in Love Again"	George Morgan	Columbia
14	2	"Country Music is Here to Stay"	Simon Crum (Ferlin Husky)	Capitol
15	4	"Come Walk with Me"	Wilma Lee & Stoney Cooper	Hickory
16	3	"Who Cares"	Don Gibson	RCA Victor
17	2	"Life to Go"	Stonewall Jackson	Columbia
18	4	"I Got Stripes"	Johnny Cash	Columbia
19	5	"Tennessee Stud"	Eddy Arnold	Columbia
20	5	"Black Land Farmer"	Frankie Miller	Starday
21	1	"City Lights"	Ray Price	Columbia
22	7	"I've Run Out of Tomorrow"	Hank Thompson	Capitol
23	4	"Which One Is to Blame"	Wilburn Brothers	Decca
24	2	"Pick Me Up on Your Way Down"	Charlie Walker	Columbia
25	7	"That's What It's Like to Be Lonesome"	Ray Price	Columbia
26	5	"Partners"	Jim Reeves	RCA Victor
27	6	"A Thousand Miles Ago"	Webb Pierce	Decca
28	1	"The Same Old Me"	Ray Price	Columbia
29	9	"Cabin in the Hills"	Flatt & Scruggs	Columbia
30	6	"Somebody's Back in Town"	Wilburn Brothers	Decca
31	9	"Am I That Easy to Forget"	Carl Belew	Decca
32	5	"Set Him Free"	Skeeter Davis	RCA Victor
33	5	"Jimmy Brown the Newsboy"	Mac Wiseman	Dot
34	5	"Gotta Travel On"	Billy Grammer	Monument
35	7	"Who Shot Sam"	George Jones	Mercury
36	5	"Don't Tell Me Your Troubles"	Don Gibson	RCA Victor
37	5	"Mommy for a Day"	Kitty Wells	Decca
38	5	"Ten Thousand Drums"	Carl Smith	Columbia
39	4	"Under Your Spell Again"	Buck Owens	Capitol
40	12	"That's What It's Like to Be Lonesome"	Bill Anderson	Decca
41	8	"Luther Plays the Boogie"	Johnny Cash	Sun
42	7	"Dark Hollow"	Jimmie Skinner	Mercury
43	6	"Treasure of Love"	George Jones	Mercury
44	6	"Long Black Veil"	Lefty Frizzell	Columbia
45	10	"Poor Old Heartsick Me"	Margie Bowes	Hickory
46	7	"Family Man"	Frankie Miller	Starday
47	9	"Grin and Bear It"	Jimmy C. Newman	M-G-M
48	3	"The Last Ride"	Hank Snow	RCA Victor
49	3	"There's a Big Wheel"	Wilma Lee & Stoney Cooper	Hickory
50	9	"My Baby's Gone"	Louvin Brothers	Capitol

== See also ==
- List of Hot C&W Sides number ones of 1959
- List of Billboard Hot 100 number ones of 1959
- 1959 in country music
