= North to Alaska =

1960 film by Henry Hathaway, John Wayne

- 1960 movie poster
- Directed by: Henry Hathaway
- Written by: John Lee Mahin; Martin Rackin; Claude Binyon; Wendell Mayes (uncredited); Ben Hecht (uncredited)
- Based on: Birthday Gift; 1939 play by Ladislas Fodor from an idea by John Kafka
- Produced by: Henry Hathaway; John Lee Mahin (uncredited); Charles Feldman (uncredited)
- Starring: John Wayne; Stewart Granger; Ernie Kovacs; Fabian; Capucine; Mickey Shaughnessy
- Cinematography: Leon Shamroy
- Edited by: Dorothy Spencer
- Music by: Lionel Newman
- Production company: 20th Century Fox
- Distributed by: 20th Century Fox
- Release date: November 10, 1960
- Running time: 122 minutes
- Country: United States
- Language: English
- Budget: $3.8 million
- Box office: $5 million (US/ Canada rentals); 1,994,920 admissions (France)

North to Alaska is a 1960 American comedy Western/Northern film directed by Henry Hathaway and John Wayne (uncredited). The picture stars Wayne along with Stewart Granger, Ernie Kovacs, Fabian, and Capucine. The script is based on the 1939 play Birthday Gift by Ladislas Fodor and is set during the Nome gold rush.

The film featured Johnny Horton's song "North to Alaska," sung during the opening titles, setting up an introduction to the story.

== Plot ==
In 1900, after finding gold while panning in Nome, Alaska, on their claim, brothers George and Billy Pratt and partner "Big" Sam McCord have become rich. Sam plans to travel to Seattle, to purchase mining equipment; George also asks Sam to bring back his fiancée, Jenny Lamont, a French girl whom George has never met, but has corresponded with for three years. Sam is disgusted by marriage, which he considers tantamount to slavery, and cannot understand why George would willingly seek matrimony, but he reluctantly agrees. Frankie Cannon, a recently arrived confidence man, runs into Sam in town and attempts to swindle him out of some of his money before he leaves.

After arriving in Seattle and finding that George's girl has already married another man, Sam brings back prostitute Michelle "Angel" Bonnet as a substitute, giving her the gifts originally intended for Jenny. Angel misunderstands Sam's intentions, though, believing that Sam's offer is for her to be with Sam; during a reunion picnic of Sam's old logging friends the following day, Angel becomes enamored of Sam, who treats her like a respectable lady. On the boat trip, Angel learns of the misunderstanding. Sam intends for her to return to Seattle, but she disembarks at Nome and plans to stay at the hotel until the return boat arrives. Since Sam has been gone, Frankie has become the owner of the hotel, having won it from the previous owner in a game of cards. Frankie and Angel are revealed to have known each other from their past lives, and Angel was formerly Frankie's girl. Refusing to stay in the hotel and become Frankie's girl again, Angel stages a fake fight, storms out of the hotel, and travels with Sam to the homestead where the Pratts and he live.

Upon arriving at the homestead, Sam immediately leaves to join George at a neighbor's claim, where claim jumpers are attempting to drive off the claim holders. After fighting off the claim jumpers, Sam notifies George that Jenny is married, and tells him about Angel. Meanwhile, 17-year-old Billy has become infatuated with Angel back at the homestead, and attempts to impress her by acting as if he is more worldly than he is. Upon his return to the claim, George rejects Angel outright, while Sam throws Billy into the river to sober up after a night of drinking. After spending some time talking to Angel, George takes a liking to her and is willing to marry her, but once he realizes that she has fallen for his partner, and that Sam has been acting strangely because he is also in love with Angel, George spends the night in the "honeymoon cabin" pretending that Angel and he are madly in love to incite Sam's jealousy to the point that he will admit his love; instead, Sam gets increasingly frustrated, and as morning arrives, finally decides he is going to leave. Meanwhile, Frankie enacts a scam to swindle the claim away from Sam and the Pratts.

Soldiers arrive at the claim, interrupting Sam's preparations to leave, and announce to Sam and the Pratts that someone else has filed a claim to their land; until the dispute can be resolved, all work must halt, and Sam and the Pratts cannot take any of the gold they have thus far acquired. When Sam resists, he is arrested and taken to town; George, Billy, and Angel all follow. In town, Sam discovers that Frankie has conned an illiterate drunk to fraudulently file a claim for their discovery. An all-out brawl in the town's muddy streets brings it all to an end, and Frankie's duplicity is uncovered to the authorities. The boat for Seattle has come early, and Angel decides to leave; however, she is convinced to stay once Sam yells out publicly that he loves her.

== Cast ==
- John Wayne as Sam McCord
- Stewart Granger as George Pratt
- Ernie Kovacs as Frankie Canon
- Fabian as Billy Pratt
- Capucine as Michelle "Angel" Bonet
- Mickey Shaughnessy as Peter Boggs
- Karl Swenson as Lars Nordquist
- Kathleen Freeman as Lena Nordquist
- John Qualen as Logger
- Stanley Adams as Breezy
- Stephen Courtleigh as Duggan
- Lilyan Chauvin as Jenny Lamont
- Douglas Dick as Lieutenant
- Richard Deacon as Angus (hotel desk clerk - uncredited)

== Production ==
=== Development ===
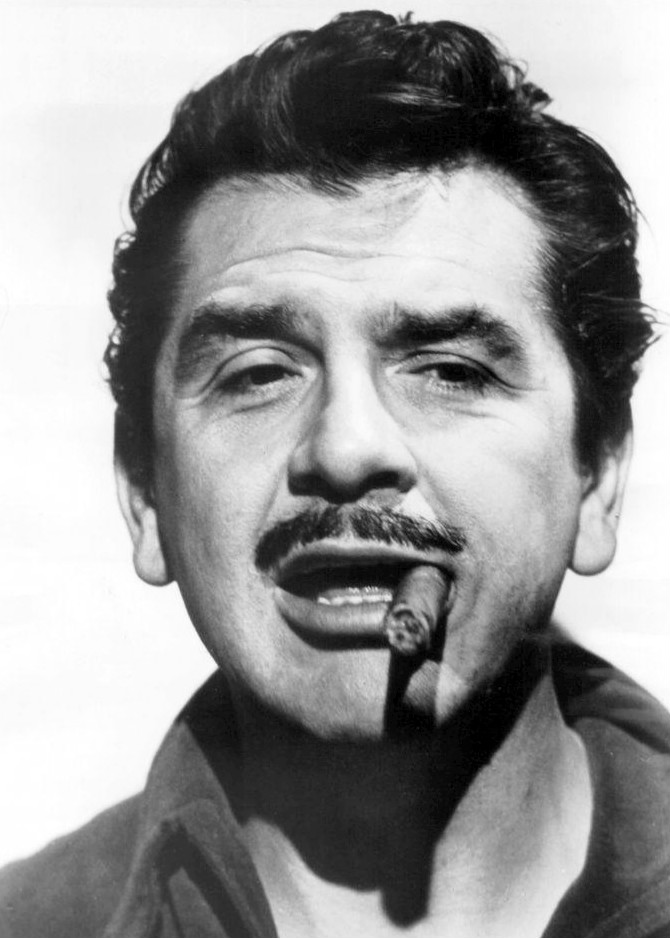
Ernie Kovacs

Alaska was admitted to the Union as the 49th state in 1959, and was much in the news at the time. In early 1959, 20th Century Fox announced it would make The Alaskans starring John Wayne and written by Martin Rackin and John Lee Mahin (the three men had just made The Horse Soldiers together). The film was the first in a three-movie contract for Wayne with 20th Century Fox.

The first choice for director by Wayne was Henry Hathaway. He had a commitment to direct Woman Obsessed, however, and was replaced by Richard Fleischer, who had a contract with 20th Century Fox and had just made the successful Compulsion (1959). Fleischer was enthusiastic about making a John Wayne film, but did not like the story. He says a prime force behind the film was the agent Charles Feldman, who represented production head Buddy Adler, Wayne, Rackin, and Mahin, and whose girlfriend Capucine was to play the female lead. Adler insisted Fleischer make the film because John Wayne had committed without reading a script and might pull out if the director pulled out. Fleischer says he got out of the film by saying he did not want to work with Capucine. Hathaway became available and his appointment was announced in March 1959.

Hathaway says the original script was full of cliches from every Alaska gold rush film ever made, adding, "I should know, I worked on two versions of The Spoilers." Therefore, he decided to emphasize the characterization and personal elements, making it more comic. He said it was not a spoof of adventure films, but "the situations were funny within the legitimate story."

Spyros Skouras wanted the budget of the film reduced; Hathaway achieved this by reducing location shots.

The movie spent a long time in preproduction (during which it was also known as Go North) and was delayed by the writers' strike and Wayne's involvement in making The Alamo (1960), a passion project of his that ended up costing the actor millions of his own money. Shooting on North to Alaska did not start until May 1960.

=== Casting ===
Gary Crosby was reportedly cast as Granger's brother until replaced by Fabian, a pop singer whom 20th Century Fox had just tried to turn into a film star with Hound-Dog Man. The movie was not a success, but the studio felt that Fabian might attract younger movie goers in support roles.

=== Filming ===
Shooting began in May 1960 under the title Go North. Most of the film was shot in Point Mugu, California. The Wayne and Granger "honeymoon" cabin scenes were filmed along steaming Hot Creek near volcanic Mammoth Mountain. Mt. Morrison appears in the background of many views.

Production started without a completed script, and the movie wound up being heavily improvised. John Wayne said during the shoot:

I went to see Buddy (Buddy Adler, studio head at Fox) and Skouras (Spyros Skouras, president of Fox) and told them we didn't even have a finished script. They're supposed to have been preparing this thing for a year, but Adler tells me he'll whip it into shape personally in a few days. Then he takes off for London and Skouras heads for New York. Henry is a fine director, but he shouldn't have to be making up scenes ... Of course Marty Rackin and John Mahin, who were supposed to produce and who worked on the script, left the picture to do television. Then the writers strike came along. I guess the studio thought the strike would be ended before we started the picture. All I know is, I'd go broke if I tried this in an independent production.

Ben Hecht, who frequently worked with Hathaway, was brought in as a script doctor.

"This is great", Ernie Kovacs told a journalist as he lounged by a pool. "I've been here since 9:00 this morning and we're behind schedule, so I haven't even put on my costume. I didn't do anything during the actors' strike and now I'm back at work and I'm still not doing anything. It's a great way to make a living."

Fabian enjoyed working with John Wayne. "What you saw is what you got," recalled the singer. "He was incredible. He was very nice to me."

Capucine filmed a realistic no-foam bath while being serenaded by Fabian; this scene was sneaking through nearly three years before Jayne Mansfield officially broke the mainstream nudity ban.

Stewart Granger's marriage to Jean Simmons ended during filming. A divorce was granted in August 1960.

The head of studio, Buddy Adler, died midway through production. The movie finished filming by August 1960, was edited through September, and released in November.

== Theme song ==
The theme song's lyrics during the opening titles provide a back story for the point where the film begins: Sam McCord left Seattle in 1892 with George and Billy Pratt, "crossed the Yukon River" and "found the bonanza gold below that old white mountain just a little southeast of Nome." By "1901" Sam was known as "a mighty man", and his partner George then tells him, "I'd trade all the gold that's buried in this land for one small band of gold to place on sweet little Jenny's hand." George feels that Jenny is his "true love", and he declares he will "build for my Jenny a honeymoon home" below the same mountain where gold was discovered. An instrumental of the song is also played at the saloon on a piano when Sam and Angel arrive in Nome.

Recorded by Johnny Horton, the song lyrics were written by Mike Phillips, and it was released on August 22, 1960 . It proved to be a success when it topped the Billboard country charts for five weeks in January and February 1961 and crossed over to peak at number four on the pop charts.

However, Horton did not live to see its success, as he died in a traffic collision on November 5, 1960, (five days before the film release), and his death may have contributed to the song's success. Horton sang other tie-in songs, the most famous being the song for Fox's Sink the Bismarck!. Horton had previously topped the country charts with his song "When It's Springtime in Alaska" in 1959 and with his monster hit of the same year, "The Battle of New Orleans".

Henry Hathaway felt the title North to Alaska was slightly misleading, as it made the film sound like an adventure tale in the vein of The Spoilers when it was more of a comedy; he felt something like The Blonde Rush was more appropriate, as it would give the audience more of a guide what to expect. Fox refused, though, as they had already arranged for Horton's song to be recorded and wanted to use that as marketing for the film. The studio claimed Horton's theme tune from Sink the Bismarck! added half a million dollars to that film's gross. Hathaway was skeptical about this.

== Reception ==
=== Critical ===
The Los Angeles Times called it "old fashioned but enjoyable entertainment".

FilmInk argued "the world prepared to mock Capucine... but the resulting film was terrific fun and a big hit. What’s more, Capucine was wonderful... perfectly cast, elegant, beautiful, lovely, believably falling in love with Wayne... According to contemporary reviews, however, she didn’t get much credit for the movie’s success."

=== Box office ===
The film was popular at the box office, earning $10 million and making Fox a comfortable profit.

It was called a "money maker" at the British box office.

=== Awards ===
Fabian's performance won the "Uncrossed Heart" award for least Promising Actor of 1960 for him in The Harvard Lampoon's Annual Movie awards.

== Comic book adaptation ==
- Dell Four Color #1155 (December 1960)

== See also ==
- John Wayne filmography
