= Orange Blossom Special =

Orange Blossom Special may refer to:

- Orange Blossom Special (train), a passenger train operated by the Seaboard Air Line Railway from 1925 to 1953
- "Orange Blossom Special" (song), a 1938 song written by Ervin T. Rouse
- Orange Blossom Special (album), a 1964 album by Johnny Cash
