= Paul Gilley =

Country music songwriter

Background information
- Born: Herbert Paul Gilley; October 1, 1929; Maytown, Kentucky, US
- Died: June 16, 1957 (aged 27) Morgan County, Kentucky, US
- Genres: Country
- Occupations: Lyricist, music promoter
- Years active: 1949–1957

Herbert Paul Gilley (October 1, 1929 – June 16, 1957) was an American country music lyricist and promoter from Kentucky. In his lifetime, he was little known as a songwriter, but decades after his death by drowning at age 27, he was identified more widely as likely having written the lyrics to a dozen famous songs, including two that were hits for Hank Williams: "Cold, Cold Heart" and "I'm So Lonesome I Could Cry". He may have also written "I Overlooked an Orchid", which was a number-one country hit in 1974 for Mickey Gilley (no relation). Other songs that have been attributed to Gilley include "If Teardrops Were Pennies", "Don't Let the Stars Get in Your Eyes", and "Crazy Arms".

Gilley's contributions to songwriting are not widely known; he is not listed in the Oxford New Encyclopedia of Country Music published by the Country Music Hall of Fame and Museum, nor in Barry McCloud's Definitive Country encyclopedia. However, his hometown declared a Paul Gilley Day in 2012, and Morgan County, Kentucky, local historian W. Lynn Nickell wrote and published a biography, Paul Gilley: The Ghost Writer in the Sky.

== Early life ==
Gilley was born on a farm in the small town of Maytown, Kentucky, on October 1, 1929, the only child of father McClellan "Clell" Gilley (1889–1963) and mother Nora Alice Gilley (née Phipps, 1890–1958). He grew up a very tall boy, attending high school in nearby Ezel, where he wrote poetry – his friends said he was able to converse in rhyme. At 15, he published a poem in the local newspaper. He enrolled in Hazel Green Academy in Wolfe County, graduating in 1949. During this time, he joined several professional writing associations, including the Poetry Society of America.

Because of his 6-foot-7-inch (2.01 m) height, Gilley played basketball in high school. He was listed under "Honorable Mention" on the All-State Basketball Squad in 1944. Gilley entered Morehead State College in the fall of 1950 on a basketball scholarship, but he left after the spring semester of 1952. He wrote an article on songwriting for the summer 1951 edition of the student publication, Inkpot, and was featured in the campus newspaper The Trail Blazer in April 1951 and February 1952.

== Promoter ==
In 1949, Gilley began promoting bluegrass and country music acts, starting with a performance by the Stanley Brothers in Campton. Gilley apparently sold them his song "A Fallen Star", which was later recorded by Jim Reeves, Conway Twitty, and Bill Monroe, though the lyrics were credited to James Joiner. The efforts of Paul Gilley Promotions were mentioned occasionally in Billboard magazine, for instance listing his 1955 clients as Lula Bell Si and her Country Folk, Linville Ball, Paul Hebert, and Bob Nash. In 1956 he promoted Beverly Bresson.

== Songwriter ==
Gilley wrote song lyrics in high school. In his first year of college, he wrote an essay titled "Getting a Song Published", warning against the "song shark", who asks for payment from the songwriter. In the Morehead Inkpot, Gilley was credited as the writer of "Cold, Cold Heart", jokingly said to have been inspired by a basketball referee. Decades later, music journalist Chet Flippo wrote in 1981 that Gilley traveled to a Nashville bus station, where he met Hank Williams to sell the songs "Cold, Cold Heart" and "I'm So Lonesome I Could Cry". Gilley sold the songs outright because the one-time payment to him was higher if he allowed others to take credit. Historian W. Lynn Nickell wrote in 2012 that the bus-station encounter was in mid-1950, with Williams curious to meet this young songwriter who had already supplied him with a couple of songs, including "I'm So Lonesome I Could Cry", and that Williams bought "Cold, Cold Heart" at the meeting. Gilley once wrote that it was "not too bad" being uncredited, since "you get paid for the lyrics—sometimes well paid." Gilley was paid in the range of $50 to $400 for each song, equivalent in today's dollars to $670–5,350.

Gilley wrote more lyrics than music, so to create songs, he occasionally collaborated with composers. His collaboration with Carter Gibbs produced the song "I'm So Lonesome I Could Cry". Another of his composer partners was Frank Kratz, who helped with "Satan Can't Hold Me", recorded by Jim Reeves. Kratz recorded "Go Cat Go", a rockabilly song, and he co-wrote "Ooh So Nice", recorded by R&B singer Johnny Adams.

== Death ==
Gilley drowned while swimming in a neighbor's pond on June 16, 1957. He was 27 years old. His protective mother was shattered by the death, and she burned his papers, destroying much of the evidence of his songwriting career. In Billboard magazine, a Dallas music agent wrote to inquire who was handling the Gilley estate, as the agent was still interested in buying two songs written by Gilley and Kratz.

== Legacy ==
Maytown, Kentucky, declared Paul Gilley Day on June 9, 2012, to honor the songwriter. At the same time, a new biography of Gilley was announced, self-published by historian W. Lynn Nickell as Paul Gilley: The Ghost Writer in the Sky. Nickell had gathered material from a wide range of sources, including handwritten lyric sheets in the possession of the son of Gilley collaborator Carter Gibbs.

== Songs ==
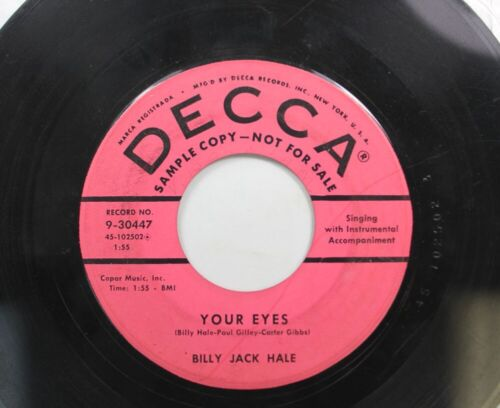
Billy Jack Hale recording of "Your Eyes" on Decca Records, 1957

- "Just When I Needed You" was credited to Clyde Baum, Jack Anglin, and Johnnie Wright. Wright and Anglin (billed as Johnnie & Jack) released the song in September 1949. Other notable artists recording the song include Little Jimmy Dickens in 1950 and Skeeter Davis in 1960. Gilley stated in 1951 that he wrote the lyrics while Baum composed the music, and that the song is "No. 118 in my folio of songs".
- "They'll Never Take Her Love from Me" was credited to Leon Payne. The song was first released by Hank Williams in 1950, with later versions by Roy Acuff, Johnny Horton, George Jones, and many more. Gilley handed the original lyric sheet to a neighbor girl, saying that the song would soon be heard on the radio, and that she should remember he wrote it.
- "I'm So Lonesome I Could Cry" was co-written with Carter Gibbs, and recorded in August 1949 by Hank Williams, who released it as a B-side in November. The Foggy River Boys covered the song the next year, with later notable versions from Marty Robbins (1957), Andy Williams (1959), Johnny Cash (1960), and Wanda Jackson (1965), among many others.
- "I Overlooked an Orchid" is credited to Carl Smith, Shirley Lyn (the pseudonym of Troy Lee Martin), Carl Story, and Arthur Q. Smith (the pseudonym of Arthur Pritchett). Carl Smith denies that Carl Story was involved. The song was recorded first by Johnnie & Jack in 1950, then in 1974 by Mickey Gilley to become a number-one hit on the country charts. (Mickey Gilley is not related to Paul Gilley.) Paul reportedly played the song first for his college friends in 1949 or early 1950.
- "Cold, Cold Heart" was recorded by Hank Williams in December 1950, then released as a B-side in February 1951. Other 1951 covers were made by Tony Bennett, Louis Armstrong, Dinah Washington, and Petula Clark. Many others subsequently covered the song. Gilley claimed credit for the song in mid-1951.
- "If Teardrops Were Pennies" was first recorded by Carl Smith in 1951, followed by Rosemary Clooney the same year, Kitty Wells in 1958, and Loretta Lynn in 1966. It was recorded as a duet by Dolly Parton and Porter Wagoner, appearing on their 1973 album Love and Music. Troy Lee Martin copyrighted the song for Peer-Southern, but Nickell writes that Gilley sold the song to Carl Smith.
- "Ashes of Love" was credited to Jim Anglin, his brother Jack, and Jack's musical partner Johnnie Wright. Johnnie & Jack released the song in 1951. Several other artists covered it, notably Don Gibson, and a duet by Kitty Wells and Johnnie Wright. Nickell asserts that the lyrics were Gilley's.
- "Don't Let the Stars Get in Your Eyes" was credited to Slim Willet, who released it as a hit single in 1952 under 4 Star Records. Ray Price reached number four with his country version, then Skeets McDonald released a western swing version. Perry Como enjoyed the biggest hit with the song in late 1952, gaining crossover sales to reach number one on Billboard's pop chart. Other notable versions include recordings by Keely Smith in 1959 and k. d. lang in 1988. Gilley has been named as the writer of the lyrics.
- "Crazy Arms" was published in 1949 with credit given to steel guitarist Ralph Mooney and Charles "Chuck" Seals. The song was recorded by Ray Price in Nashville on March 1, 1956, with a 4/4 shuffle beat. The single became Price's first number-one hit on the Billboard country chart, and established his unique sound. Price later said he got the song from a Tampa disc jockey named Bob Martin, in the form of an obscure record with a man–woman duet on the Pep label. After the song became a hit for Price, a California producer named Claude Caviness contacted Price to tell him that the woman singing was his wife, Marilyn Kaye, and that he owned Pep and held the rights to the song. Caviness and Price joined forces in 1959 to publish music under Caviness' reworked Pamper label, with artist manager James Harrell "Hal" Smith as the third owner. Among the many other cover versions of "Crazy Arms" are ones by Patsy Cline in 1964, Willie Nelson in 1970, and Linda Ronstadt in 1972. Gilley is said to have sold the song lyrics to Mooney, who wrote songs for Pep.
- "A Fallen Star" was first recorded in 1956 by Bobby E. Denton, later a state senator. Other recordings were made by Jimmy C. Newman, Ferlin Husky, Billy Byrd, Conway Twitty, Kitty Wells and the Jordanaires, Jim Reeves, Damita Jo, Jimmie Rodgers, the Cadets, Webb Pierce, Jan Howard, and B. J. Thomas. The lyrics are credited to James Joiner.
- "When It's Springtime in Alaska (It's Forty Below)" was credited to Tillman Franks and Johnny Horton, released by Horton in late 1958. Subsequent versions were recorded by Jimmy Wakely, Hank Snow, Johnny Cash, and others. Historian W. Lynn Nickell attributes this song to Gilley.
- "Me and Fred and Joe and Bill", explicitly credited to Paul Gilley and Billy Jack Hale, was recorded by Porter Wagoner for release as a single by RCA Victor in 1959. Some years earlier, a live performance by Billy Jack Hale had been recorded, released later on the Bear Family box set Big D Jamboree, rockabilly recordings from the Dallas Sportatorium.
- "Satan Can't Hold Me", co-written with Frank Kratz and Orville Stevens, was recorded by Jim Reeves for the 1959 RCA Victor album Songs to Warm the Heart.
- "Your Eyes", co-written with Billy Hale and Carter Gibbs. Recorded by Billy Jack Hale in Nashville on April 19, 1957. Original release as Decca Records catalog 9-30447.
