= Personal File =

Compilation album by Johnny Cash
- Released: May 23, 2006
- Recorded: July 11, 1973 – December 1982 at Columbia Studio
- Genre: Country
- Length: 2:18:05
- Label: Legacy/Columbia

Johnny Cash chronology
16 Biggest Hits: Johnny Cash & June Carter Cash (2006)	Personal File (2006)	American V: A Hundred Highways (2006)

Professional ratings
Review scores
Source	Rating
AllMusic	link
PopMatters	link
Music Box	link
Rolling Stone	link
Slant	5/5 stars
The Guardian	4/5 stars
Pitchfork	8.5/10

Personal File is a posthumous album by American music icon Johnny Cash. The two CD set was released posthumously on May 23, 2006, by Legacy Recordings. Personal File contains 49 unreleased tracks on two CDs recorded between 1973 and 1982. Given that all tracks on the album were previously unreleased, Personal File is considered both a posthumous album and a compilation. Recovered from a vault of material housed at the House of Cash studios, Personal File includes "Tin Pan Alley hits, traditional folk and gospel tunes, new originals and favorite covers" – by Carter Family, Louvin Brothers, Johnny Horton, John Prine, Rodney Crowell, and Carlene Carter. The album was compiled and produced by Gregg Geller with liner notes by Greil Marcus. On most of the tracks, Cash performs alone, accompanying himself on guitar, and on many tracks Cash prefaces the song with remarks about its history and what it means to him.

In 2007, Legacy released a sequel, More Songs from Johnny's Personal File, featuring additional private recordings. The first album was reissued in 2011 by Legacy under the revised title Bootleg Vol. 1: Personal File, which was followed by three more volumes of unreleased or rare recordings. (As of 2015, however, More Songs from Johnny's Personal File has yet to be reissued under this brand.)

== Track listing ==
Disc one
No.	Title	Writer(s)	Length
1.	"The Letter Edged in Black"	H. Nevada	2:39
2.	"There's a Mother Always Waiting at Home"	J. Thornton	4:21
3.	"The Engineer's Dying Child"	H. Neil/G. Davis	2:07
4.	"My Mother Was a Lady"	E. Marks	3:36
5.	"The Winding Stream"	A.P. Carter	2:37
6.	"Far Away Places"	A. Kramer/J. Whitney	2:23
7.	"Galway Bay"	Dr. A. Colahan	1:45
8.	"When I Stop Dreaming"	C. Louvin/I. Louvin	3:11
9.	"Drink to Me Only With Thine Eyes"	Ben Jonson/Traditional	3:32
10.	"I'll Take You Home Again Kathleen"	T. Westendorf	2:28
11.	"Missouri Waltz"	J.R. Shannon/F.K. Logan-Eppel	2:00
12.	"Louisiana Man"	D. Kershaw/B. Deaton	3:28
13.	"Paradise"	J. Prine	3:03
14.	"I Don't Believe You Wanted to Leave"	J. Tubb	2:56
15.	"Jim, I Wore a Tie Today"	C. Walker	2:47
16.	"Saginaw, Michigan"	B. Anderson/D. Wayne	2:29
17.	"When It's Springtime in Alaska (It's Forty Below)"	J. Horton/T. Franks	2:16
18.	"Girl in Saskatoon"	Cash/J.Horton	2:17
19.	"The Cremation of Sam McGee"	A poem by Robert W. Service	5:33
20.	"Tiger Whitehead"	Cash/N. Winston	4:44
21.	"It's All Over"	Cash	2:49
22.	"A Fast Song"	Cash	2:32
23.	"Virgie"	Cash	2:57
24.	"I Wanted So"	Cash	2:41
25.	"It Takes One to Know Me"	C. Carter	3:14

Disc two
No.	Title	Writer(s)	Length
1.	"Seal It in My Heart and Mind"	Cash	1:51
2.	"Wildwood in the Pines"	R. Crowell	2:41
3.	"Who at My Door Is Standing"	M.B.C. Slade/A.B. Everett	2:31
4.	"Have Thine Own Way, Lord"	A. Pollard/G. Stebbins	3:43
5.	"Lights of Magdala"	L. Murray	2:26
6.	"If Jesus Ever Loved a Woman"	Unknown	2:39
7.	"The Lily of the Valley"	C.W. Fry/W.S. Hays	1:45
8.	"Have a Drink of Water"	Unknown	3:36
9.	"The Way Worn Traveler"	A.P. Carter	2:03
10.	"Look Unto the East"	Cash	2:12
11.	"Matthew 24 (Is Knocking at the Door)"	Cash/June Carter Cash	1:57
12.	"The House Is Falling Down"	Unknown	2:51
13.	"One of These Days I'm Gonna Sit Down and Talk to Paul"	Cash	3:20
14.	"What on Earth (Will You Do for Heaven's Sake)"	Cash	2:44
15.	"My Children Walk in Truth"	Cash	2:50
16.	"No Earthly Good"	Cash	1:51
17.	"Sanctified"	Cash	2:33
18.	"Lord, Lord, Lord"	Unknown	2:20
19.	"What Is Man"	Cash	2:24
20.	"Over the Next Hill (We'll Be Home)"	Cash	2:55
21.	"A Half a Mile a Day"	Cash	4:25
22.	"Farther Along"	Traditional	2:57
23.	"Life's Railway to Heaven"	M.E. Abbey/C.D. Tillman	2:14
24.	"In the Sweet By-and-By"	S.F. Bennett/J.P. Webster	2:50

== Personnel ==
- Johnny Cash - Vocals, Guitar, Producer

=== Additional personnel ===
- Vic Anesini – Mastering
- Charlie Bragg – Engineer
- John Carter Cash – Executive Producer
- Gregg Geller – Producer, Compilation
- John Jackson – Project Director
- Greil Marcus – Liner Notes
- Jim Marshall – Photography, Cover Photo
- Randall Martin – Art Direction, Design
- Rosa Menkes – Producer
- Lou Robin – Executive Producer

== Chart performance ==
Chart (2006)	Peak position
Austrian Albums (Ö3 Austria)	35
Belgian Albums (Ultratop Flanders)	93
Canadian Albums (Nielsen SoundScan)	79
Dutch Albums (Album Top 100)	74
French Albums (SNEP)	200
German Albums (Offizielle Top 100)	18
Irish Albums (IRMA)	31
New Zealand Albums (RMNZ)	19
Norwegian Albums (VG-lista)	21
Scottish Albums (OCC)	73
Swedish Albums (Sverigetopplistan)	24
Swiss Albums (Schweizer Hitparade)	65
UK Albums (OCC)	84
US Billboard 200	108
US Top Country Albums (Billboard)	22

== Reviews ==
- "Johnny Cash Treasure Chest on the Way" - CMT
- "Johnny Cash's Vault Opens" - Rolling Stone
- "Johnny Cash Gets Personal" - Spin
