= The Toluenes =

The Toluenes is an alternative country/Americana band based in East Tennessee. The group consists of lead vocalist Jamon Scott, guitarist Brian Blush, bassist Dan Allen Crawley and drummer Chris Rickman.

The Toluenes music spans various genres, with some songs containing a heavy country flavor while others have a raw modern rock edge. Their lyrics frequently center around stories set in the Southwest and contain numerous references to Mexico.

== History ==
The Toluenes was formed in 2005 by Jamon Scott and Dan Allen Crawley. The two had met years earlier in the south-central Kentucky town of Albany, where they attended high school together. Both went on to become aspiring songwriters in Nashville for several years in the mid-to-late 1990s before deciding to form a band and record their own songs.

The band was originally conceived as a duo with Scott and Crawley playing all the instruments in the studio and performing live shows with an ever-changing line-up of backing musicians which has included, among others, former Charlie Daniels Band drummer Gary Allen.

== Hola from The Toluenes ==
Hola from The Toluenes is a 5-song e.p. released in limited quantities in 2005. The songs on Hola were twangy Americana at heart but with prominent electric guitars and a heavy Southwestern influence. Lyrically, the songs alternate from humorous stories of self-inflicted mishap to woeful tales of loss and the anguish that drives one to take such ill-advised risks.

== Four Chords & A Pack of Lies ==
Four Chords & A Pack of Lies was released in 2007 and was the first full-length album from The Toluenes. The title of the disc is a reference to the Harlan Howard quote that “country music is three chords and the truth”. The set includes the five songs from their previous effort, along with five more songs that further expand upon the story only hinted at on that first outing. A concept album of sorts, Four Chords & A Pack of Lies tells the story of heartbreak and the journey that results from trying to run away from a pain that cannot be eluded. Two songs, Adios New Mexico and Mexico, received airplay on internet and college radio.

== Off The Wagon & On The Lam ==
Released in the winter of 2008, Off The Wagon and On The Lam is the second full-length release from The Toluenes. The 10 songs pick up right where Four Chords left off with more tales of love and alcohol. Musically, the band is more adventuresome this time out with a pair of dark alternative numbers and a couple of radio-ready country singles. The first single from OTWAOTL was El Diablo, while Drunk & Naked was the follow-up.

== Cervezas, Senoritas, Etc., Etc. ==
While touring in support of Off The Wagon and On The Lam, Scott and Crawley began assembling songs for the follow-up. However, in August 2009, Crawley announced that he was leaving the band. Scott decided to continue on as The Toluenes and went into the studio to work on the next album with guitarist Dave Flint, who is best known for his work with Highway 101. The result was a more organic, country-flavored record entitled Cervezas, Senoritas, Etc., Etc. The title of the disc was a reference to Dwight Yoakam’s Guitars, Cadillacs, Etc., Etc. The lead-off single, Middle of Nowhere, was an acoustic songwriting demo that was added to the album at the last minute. It also became The Toluenes’ first-ever music video. The second single, Bones, was also accompanied by a video.

== Quatro Hello ==
In late 2010, Scott went back into the studio to record a handful of tracks for the follow-up to Cervezas, Senoritas, Etc., Etc. Working with guitarist Flint again, Jamon also enlisted the services of a number of outside musicians including Geoff Firebaugh (formerly of BR5-49) and Brian Blush (formerly of The Refreshments). During sessions for Her Way Or The Highway and Dead Horses, Scott and Blush discovered a musical chemistry that, ultimately, led to Blush being invited to join the band. At the same time, Scott had been talking with Crawley about a possible return to the fold, this time as a bassist. Drummer Chris Rickman, who had played with the group a few years earlier, also returned to the fold, making the band a foursome. Quatro Hello is, reportedly, a return to the harder-rocking music of The Toluenes’ first two records. An unfinished song entitled Her Way Or The Highway was leaked on Youtube in October. Quatro Hello is scheduled for release on March 8, 2011.

== Bottle Rockets ==
In 2006, Jamon and comedian/magician/actor Scott Sullivan co-created and co-starred in an independent t.v. pilot entitled Bottle Rockets. The proposed series is a 30-minute sitcom that is set in Nashville and revolves around a group of friends who are trying to make it in the entertainment business. Jamon’s character is a singer/songwriter with a penchant for getting into mishaps (usually brought on by a woman) and then writing and performing a song about it at the end of each episode. He drew on a repertoire of songs he had previously written. The pilot won first place in the 2007 Indie Gathering Film Festival and was screened at the 2008 Cannes Film Festival. It also won top awards at the 2009 Las Vegas International Film Festival, the Accolade Television Awards and the World Independent Film Expo. Crawley also appears in the pilot, playing himself and performing two musical numbers. The episode contains various renditions of several songs from The Toluenes’ first two studio albums.

== Band members ==
Jamon Scott – Lead Vocals, Acoustic Guitar (2005 to present)

Brian Blush – Lead & Rhythm Guitars (2010 to present)

Dan Allen Crawley – Bass (2005 to 2009, 2010 to present)

Chris Rickman – Drums (2005 to 2007, 2010 to present)

== Discography ==
Hola from The Toluenes (2005)

Four Chords & A Pack of Lies (2007)

Off The Wagon and On The Lam (2008)

Cervezas, Senoritas, Etc., Etc. (2010)

Quatro Hello (2011)
