= Orange Blossom Special (album) =

Studio album by Johnny Cash
- Released: February 22, 1965
- Recorded: August 27 – December 20, 1964
- Genres: Folk; country
- Length: 33:17
- Language: English
- Label: Columbia
- Producers: Don Law; Frank Jones

Johnny Cash chronology
Original Sun Sound of Johnny Cash (1964)	Orange Blossom Special (1965)	Johnny Cash Sings the Ballads of the True West (1965)

Singles from Orange Blossom Special
- 1. "It Ain't Me Babe" Released: October 6, 1964; 2. "Orange Blossom Special" Released: January 4, 1965

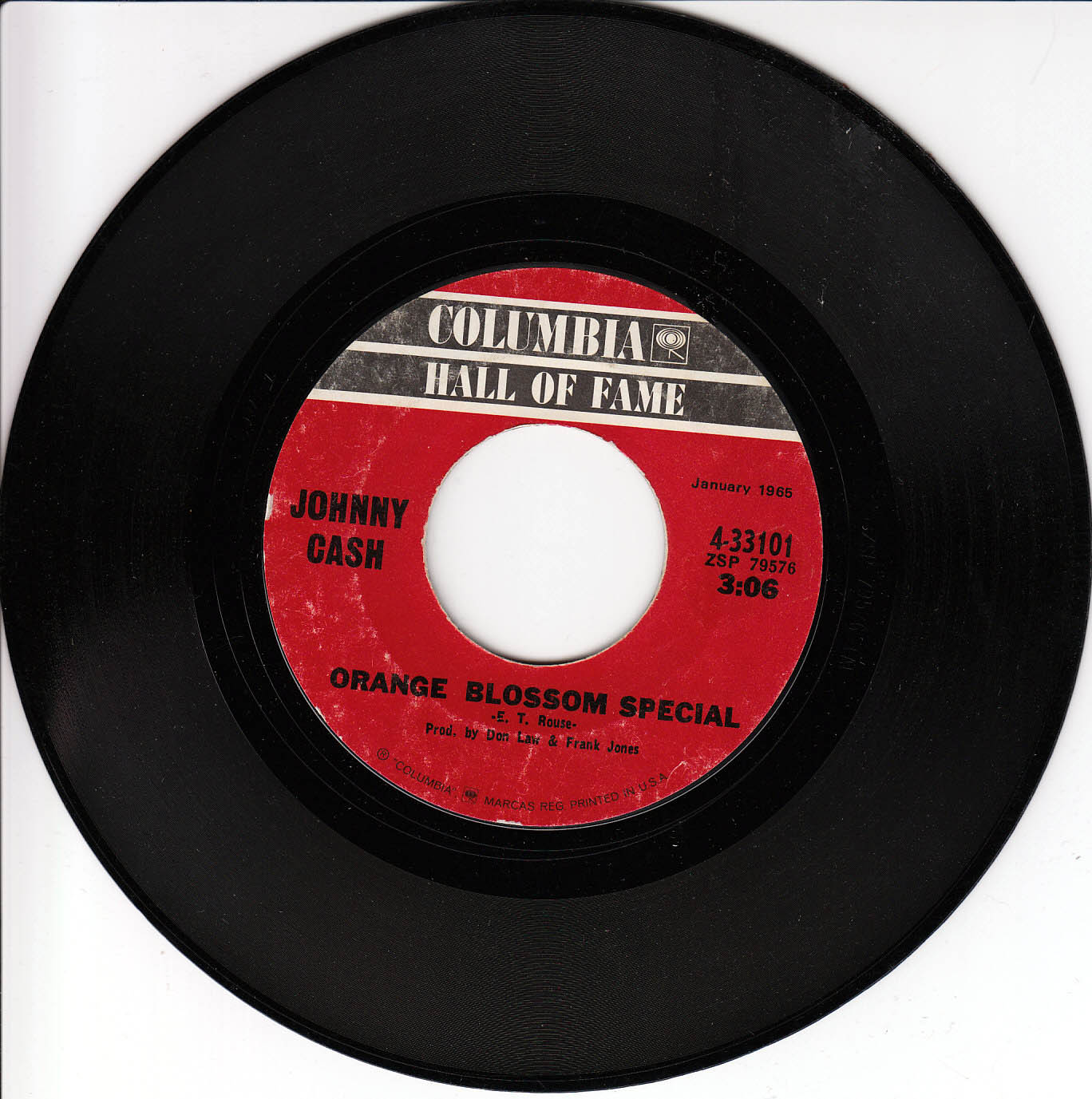
A single with Johnny Cash's version of the widely recorded song Orange Blossom Special

Orange Blossom Special is the thirteenth album released by musician Johnny Cash on Columbia Records in 1965. The recordings include country and folk standards, such as "The Long Black Veil", "When It's Springtime in Alaska (It's Forty Below)", "Danny Boy" and "Wildwood Flower".

The album's title song was "Orange Blossom Special", released previous to the album, it became a success. At the time it was recorded, the authorship of the song was not widely known, being commonly covered by diverse artists. Cash learned from Maybelle Carter that the song was written by Ervin T. Rouse, who Cash later met during a show in Miami, Florida. Cash's recording is unusual in his repertoire for featuring a tenor saxophone solo by Boots Randolph, an instrument (and musician) rarely spotlighted on Cash's recordings.

The album also contains three songs written by Bob Dylan: "It Ain't Me Babe", "Don't Think Twice, It's Alright" and "Mama, You Been on My Mind". The last one was recorded by Dylan as a demo or outtake from an album and the 1964 performance later appeared in "bootleg" collections, but it was first released on this LP by Cash. Cash had previously borrowed the melody of "Don't Think Twice" for his recording "Understand Your Man."

Released in February 1965, the album reached number three on the Billboard Country Albums chart as well as forty-nine on the Billboard 200. The single "Orange Blossom Special" peaked at number three on the Billboard Hot Country Singles and the duet with June Carter "It Ain't Me Babe" peaked at number four in Hot Country Singles.

== Background and recording ==
Following the recording of the concept album Bitter Tears: Ballads of the American Indian, Cash recorded 'Orange Blossom Special' between August 27 and December 20, 1964. The recordings included a series of country and folk standards such as Lefty Frizzell's, "The Long Black Veil", Tillman Franks' "When It's Springtime in Alaska (It's Forty Below)", A.P. Carter's "Wildwood Flower", Jester Hairston's "Amen", and Frederic Weatherly's "Danny Boy".

"Orange Blossom Special"
The title song of the album was released as a single previous to the full release, peaking at number three on Billboard's Hot Country Singles.

Due to the acclaim that the cover of the song "Orange Blossom Special" received from the audiences that attended live concerts of Cash, a single of the song was released previous to the album, in February 1965 reaching number three in the Billboard singles. During the mid-1960s, the authorship of the song was not widely known. Cash asked Maybelle Carter during the recording session about the original author, Carter stated that the song was written by Ervin T. Rouse and his brother Gordon. Carter also told Cash that the songwriter resided in Florida. Cash called Florida disk jockey Jim Brooker, who told him that he lived with the Seminoles on the Everglades. In order to locate him, Brooker announced on air during his radio show, that if Rouse was listening to call the station to give him the phone number of Cash. Rouse called the station and contacted Cash who told him that he would be soon in Miami, Florida for a scheduled concert.

During an intermission of the show in Miami, a man approached Cash backstage claiming to be Ervin Rouse. Cash recalled hearing the name but he could not remember who Rouse was. After clarifying that he had written a few songs, he remarked that one he co-wrote with his brother, named "The Special", was particularly successful. Cash recognized that he was talking about Orange Blossom Special. Cash believed the man, who actually was Rouse, that he had traveled from his house in the everglades in a custom-made swamp buggy to the house of his sister in Miami, where he borrowed her bicycle to ride ten miles to be at the concert. Cash invited the man to perform the song with him in the concert, receiving the acclaim of the audience. Later Rouse stated: "The Special belongs to everybody by now, I guess, but it used to be my best number" Cash's back-cover album notes for Orange Blossom Special are devoted to describing his meeting with Rouse.

"It Ain't Me Babe"
A duet with June Carter, the song was written by Bob Dylan, who also allowed Cash to record two other of his songs for the album.

Complementary to the standards, the album also featured covers of Bob Dylan. Cash had met Dylan briefly backstage during one of his performances at The Gaslight Cafe, but they talked extensively after a show in Newport, Rhode Island. Cash and Dylan traded songs in a motel, where Joan Baez wrote for Cash the lyrics of "It Ain't Me Babe" and "Mama, You Been on My Mind". The first song was originally released in Dylan's Another Side of Bob Dylan, but the second was only recorded as a demo by Dylan. In addition "Don't Think Twice, It's All Right" was included. To publicize both of their artists, Columbia Records released the single "It Ain't Me Babe" with the liner: "A new song from Bob Dylan on a new single sung by Johnny Cash".

== Release and reception ==
The album was released in February 1965, it reached number three in Billboard's Country albums and forty-nine in pop albums respectively. The single "Orange Blossom Special" peaked number three on Billboards Hot Country Singles as well as eighty in the Hot 100. The duet with June Carter "It Ain't Me Babe" peaked number four in Hot Country Singles and number fifty-eight in the Hot 100.

Professional ratings
Review scores
Source	Rating
AllMusic	link
Record Mirror	4/5 stars
The Rolling Stone Album Guide	3.5/5 stars

Billboard wrote: "Cash is in fine form here and he has been coupled with a great selection of material. Cash displays a sense of drama and wit". AllMusic later wrote about the album: "Even if the best and most popular of the songs on this 1965 album are the ones most likely to show up on greatest-hits compilations, it certainly rates as one of Cash's finer non-greatest-hits releases".

The song "Orange Blossom Special" later became a regular part of Cash's concerts, with Cash performing both harmonica parts himself, usually with a dual-harmonica technique. During a performance included on his At Folsom Prison live album, Cash jokes that the song requires him to "change harmonicas faster than kiss[ing] a duck".

== Track listing ==
=== Original issue ===
Side one
No.	Title	Writer(s)	Length
1.	"Orange Blossom Special"	Ervin T. Rouse	3:06
2.	"The Long Black Veil"	Marijohn Wilkin, Danny Dill	3:06
3.	"It Ain't Me Babe"	Bob Dylan	3:03
4.	"The Wall"	Harlan Howard	2:09
5.	"Don't Think Twice, It's All Right"	Bob Dylan	2:56
6.	"You Wild Colorado"	Johnny Cash	1:45

Side two
No.	Title	Writer(s)	Length
1.	"Mama, You Been on My Mind"	Bob Dylan	3:02
2.	"When It's Springtime in Alaska (It's Forty Below)"	Tillman Franks	2:36
3.	"All of God's Children Ain't Free"	Johnny Cash	2:11
4.	"Danny Boy"	Frederic Weatherly	5:08
5.	"Wildwood Flower"	A.P. Carter	2:10
6.	"Amen"	Jester Hairston	2:05

=== 2002 re-issue ===
Complementary to the original released songs from tracks 1 to 12, the 2002 reissue featured:
No.	Title	Writer(s)	Length
13.	"Engine 143"	unknown/A.P. Carter	3:31
14.	"(I'm Proud) The Baby is Mine"	Cash	2:30
15.	"Mama, You Been on My Mind"	Dylan	2:54

== Personnel ==
- Johnny Cash - vocals, guitar
- June Carter - vocals
- Luther Perkins, Norman Blake, Ray Edenton - guitar
- Marshall Grant - bass
- W.S. Holland - drums
- Bill Pursell - piano
- Charlie McCoy - harmonica
- Bill McElhiney, Karl Garvin - trumpet
- Boots Randolph - saxophone

== Chart Positions ==
Album – Billboard (United States)

Year	Chart	Peak
1965	Country Albums	3
1965	Pop Albums	49

Singles - Billboard (United States)

Year	Single	Chart	Peak
1964	"It Ain't Me, Babe"	Hot Country Singles	4
1964	"It Ain't Me, Babe"	Pop Singles	58
1965	"Orange Blossom Special"	Hot Country Singles	3
1965	"Orange Blossom Special"	Pop Singles	80
