= List of Hot C&W Sides number ones of 1959 =

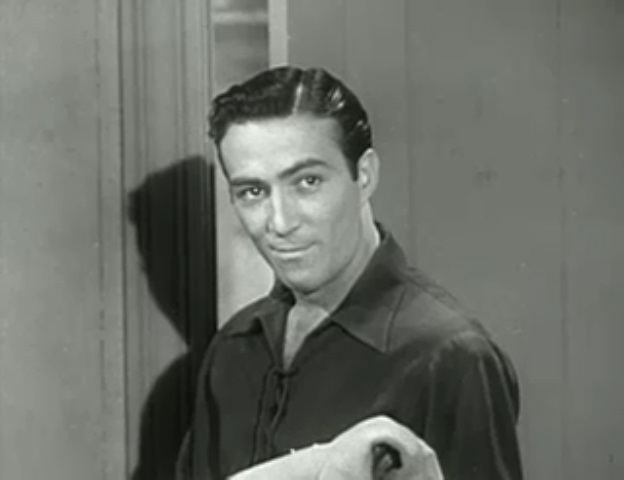
Faron Young topped the chart in the fall with "Country Girl".

Hot Country Songs is a chart that ranks the top-performing country music songs in the United States, published by Billboard magazine since 1958, when the magazine amalgamated its separate C&W Best Sellers in Stores and Most Played C&W by Jockeys charts. In 1959, eleven different songs topped the chart, then published under the title Hot C&W Sides, in 52 issues of the magazine, based on playlists submitted by country music radio stations and sales reports submitted by stores.

At the start of the year the song at number one was "City Lights" by Ray Price. The song had been in the top spot since the issue of Billboard dated October 20, 1958, the first in which the magazine combined country sales and airplay into a single chart, and remained at number one until the issue dated January 19, 1959. Four artists achieved a number one country single for the first time in 1959: Johnny Horton with "When It's Springtime in Alaska (It's Forty Below)", George Jones with "White Lightning", which replaced Horton's song at number one, Stonewall Jackson with "Waterloo", and the Browns with "The Three Bells". Of these, Jones would prove to have the most prolific career, topping the Hot Country chart in four consecutive decades. At the time of his death in 2013, he had placed more singles on Billboard's charts than any other artist in any genre.

Following Jones' spell at number one, Johnny Horton returned to the top spot with "The Battle of New Orleans", which spent ten weeks at the peak of the chart. His total of eleven weeks at number one was the most by any artist; he and Ray Price were the only artists to place more than one song at number one during the year. "The Battle of New Orleans" tied with "The Three Bells" for the most weeks spent at number one by a song during the year. Both tracks also topped Billboard's all-genres chart, the Hot 100. Despite the success of "The Three Bells", it would prove to be the only country number one for the Browns, although lead singer Jim Ed Brown would return to the peak position on the country chart 17 years later, as part of a duet pairing with Helen Cornelius. Of the nine acts who topped the chart in 1959, seven have been inducted into the Country Music Hall of Fame: Ray Price, Jim Reeves, Johnny Cash, George Jones, the Browns, Faron Young and Marty Robbins. Robbins ended the year at number one with "El Paso", another crossover hit which also topped the Hot 100.

== Chart history ==
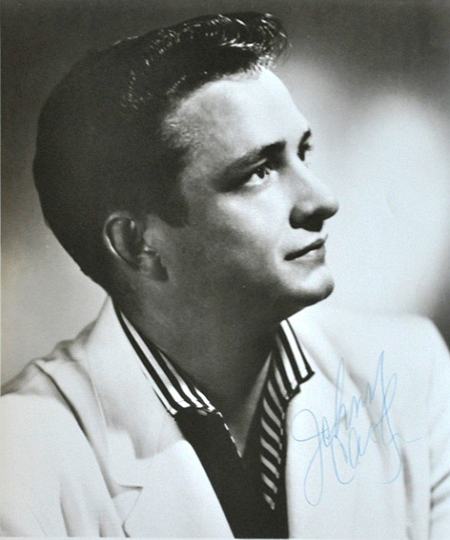
Johnny Cash had a six-week run at number one in the spring.

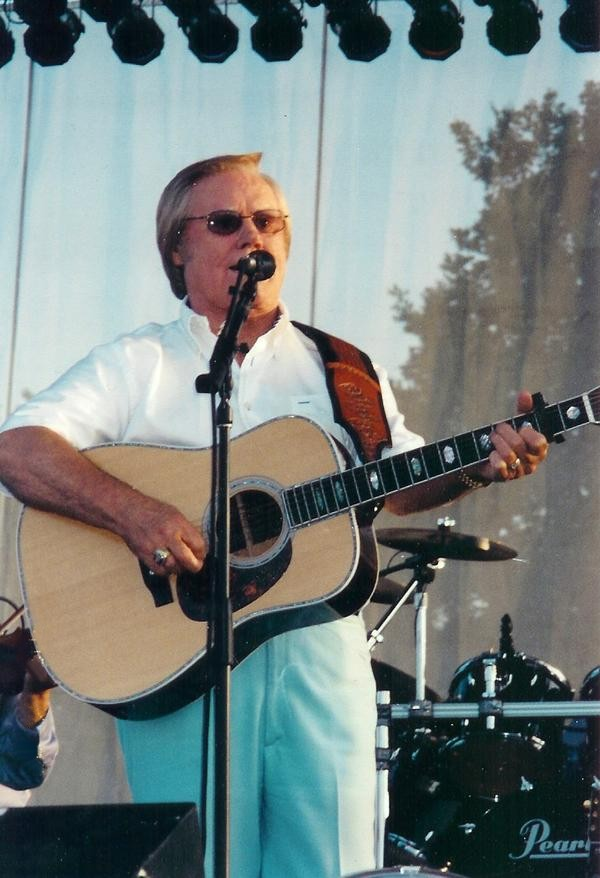
George Jones (pictured in 2002) had his first number one in 1959.

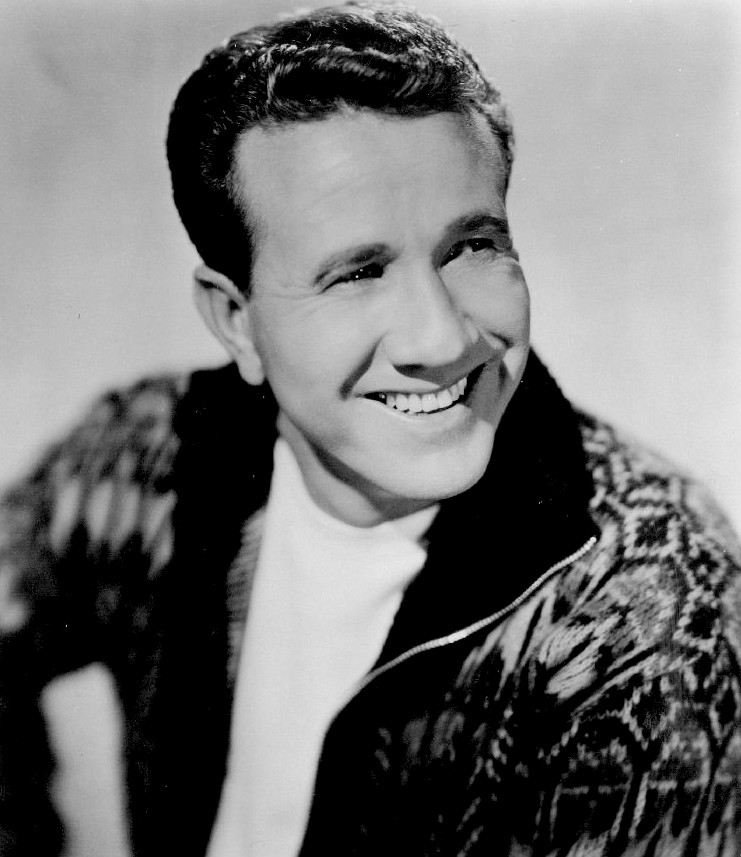
Marty Robbins ended the year at number one.

Issue date	Title	Artist(s)	Ref.
January 5	"City Lights"	Ray Price	
January 12	"City Lights"	Ray Price	
January 19	"Billy Bayou"	Jim Reeves	
January 26	"Billy Bayou"	Jim Reeves	
February 2	"Billy Bayou"	Jim Reeves	
February 9	"Billy Bayou"	Jim Reeves	
February 16	"Billy Bayou"	Jim Reeves	
February 23	"Don't Take Your Guns To Town"	Johnny Cash	
March 2	"Don't Take Your Guns To Town"	Johnny Cash	
March 9	"Don't Take Your Guns To Town"	Johnny Cash	
March 16	"Don't Take Your Guns To Town"	Johnny Cash	
March 23	"Don't Take Your Guns To Town"	Johnny Cash	
March 30	"Don't Take Your Guns To Town"	Johnny Cash	
April 6	"When It's Springtime In Alaska (It's Forty Below)"	Johnny Horton	
April 13	"White Lightning"	George Jones	
April 20	"White Lightning"	George Jones	
April 27	"White Lightning"	George Jones	
May 4	"White Lightning"	George Jones	
May 11	"White Lightning"	George Jones	
May 18	"The Battle of New Orleans"	Johnny Horton	
May 25	"The Battle of New Orleans"	Johnny Horton	
June 1	"The Battle of New Orleans"	Johnny Horton	
June 8	"The Battle of New Orleans"	Johnny Horton	
June 15	"The Battle of New Orleans"	Johnny Horton	
June 22	"The Battle of New Orleans"	Johnny Horton	
June 29	"The Battle of New Orleans"	Johnny Horton	
July 6	"The Battle of New Orleans"	Johnny Horton	
July 13	"The Battle of New Orleans"	Johnny Horton	
July 20	"The Battle of New Orleans"	Johnny Horton	
July 27	"Waterloo"	Stonewall Jackson	
August 3	"Waterloo"	Stonewall Jackson	
August 10	"Waterloo"	Stonewall Jackson	
August 17	"Waterloo"	Stonewall Jackson	
August 24	"Waterloo"	Stonewall Jackson	
August 31	"The Three Bells"	The Browns	
September 7	"The Three Bells"	The Browns	
September 14	"The Three Bells"	The Browns	
September 21	"The Three Bells"	The Browns	
September 28	"The Three Bells"	The Browns	
October 5	"The Three Bells"	The Browns	
October 12	"The Three Bells"	The Browns	
October 19	"The Three Bells"	The Browns	
October 26	"The Three Bells"	The Browns	
November 2	"The Three Bells"	The Browns	
November 9	"Country Girl"	Faron Young	
November 16	"Country Girl"	Faron Young	
November 23	"Country Girl"	Faron Young	
November 30	"Country Girl"	Faron Young	
December 7	"The Same Old Me"	Ray Price	
December 14	"The Same Old Me"	Ray Price	
December 21	"El Paso"	Marty Robbins	
December 28	"El Paso"	Marty Robbins	

== See also ==
- 1959 in music
- 1959 in country music
- List of artists who reached number one on the U.S. country chart
