= North to Alaska (song) =

Single by Johnny Horton

from the album Greatest Hits
- B-side: "The Mansion You Stole"
- Released: August 22, 1960
- Recorded: August 9, 1960
- Genre: Country
- Length: 2:49
- Label: Columbia
- Songwriters: Mike Phillips, Tillman Franks
- Producer: Don Law

Johnny Horton singles chronology
| "Johnny Freedom" (1960) | "North to Alaska" (1960) | "Sleepy-Eyed John" (1961) |

"North to Alaska" is a 1960 hit song recorded by Johnny Horton that was featured in the movie of the same name. The song was written by Mike Phillips, along with Tillman Franks. Though Horton had sung several popular movie tie-in songs, this was the first one that was sung over the opening titles. Horton died in an automobile accident November 5, 1960, five days before the movie was released. Members of the Western Writers of America chose it as one of the Top 100 Western songs of all time.

== Background ==
The song's lyrics during the opening titles of the film provide a back story for the point where the film begins: Sam McCord left Seattle in 1892 with George and Billy Pratt, "crossed the Yukon river" and "found the Bonanza gold below that old white mountain just a little southeast of Nome." By "1901" Sam was known as "a mighty man", and his partner George then tells him, "I'd trade all the gold that's buried in this land for one small band of gold to place on sweet little Jenny's hand." George feels that Jenny is his "true love", and he declares he will "build for my Jenny a honeymoon home" below the same mountain where gold was discovered. An instrumental of the song is also played at the saloon on a piano when Sam and Angel arrive in Nome. The bass singing portion is done by Rusty Goodman.

== Chart performance ==
"North to Alaska" topped Billboard magazine's Country Singles chart, reached number four on the Billboard Hot 100 chart and eight on Norway Singles Chart.

| Chart (1960–61) | Peak position |
|---|---|
| Australia Singles Chart | 2 |
| Canada (CHUM) | 1 |
| New Zealand (Lever Hit Parade) | 6 |
| Norway (VG-lista) | 8 |
| UK Singles (Official Charts) | 23 |
| US Billboard Hot 100 | 4 |
| US Hot Country Songs (Billboard) | 1 |
| West Germany | 41 |
