= Sink the Bismarck (disambiguation) =

The Bismarck was a battleship of the German navy during World War II, named after Otto von Bismarck.

- Sink the Bismarck!, a 1960 war film about the sinking of the Bismarck starring Kenneth More and Dana Wynter
- "Sink the Bismark", a 1960 Johnny Horton song inspired by the movie
- The Last Nine Days of the Bismarck, the novel the film is based on, released after the film as Sink the Bismarck!
- Sink the Bismarck (often abbreviated to "Sink the Biz") is also the name of a skill-based drinking game, which involves floating a glass in a larger container filled with beer, then pouring more beer into the glass without letting it sink.

For the sinking of the Bismarck battleship in 1941, see:

- Operation Rheinübung for Bismarck's sortie into the Atlantic on 18 May 1941
- Battle of the Denmark Strait for Bismarck's sinking of HMS Hood on 24 May 1941
- Last battle of the battleship Bismarck for the sinking of the Bismarck on 27 May 1941

== Beer ==
- BrewDog § Strongest beer claims
