= It Won't Hurt =

Single by Dwight Yoakam

from the album Guitars, Cadillacs, Etc., Etc.
- B-side: "Bury Me"
- Released: November 3, 1986
- Genre: Country
- Length: 3:03
- Label: Reprise 28565
- Songwriter: Dwight Yoakam
- Producer: Pete Anderson

Dwight Yoakam singles chronology
"Guitars, Cadillacs" (1986)	"It Won't Hurt" (1986)	"Little Sister" (1987)

"It Won't Hurt" is a song written and recorded by American country music artist Dwight Yoakam. It was released in November 1986 as the third and final single from his debut album Guitars, Cadillacs, Etc., Etc.. While it missed the top 30 on the Billboard Hot Country Songs chart, it became a top ten hit in Canada, peaking at number 7 on the Canadian RPM country singles chart. The song can be heard during the outro to Yoakam's music video for "Honky-Tonk Man".

== Critical reception ==
Larry Flick, of Billboard magazine reviewed the song favorably, calling it a "classic hurtin' and drinkin' song convincingly sung." Spin wrote, "Fiddles and banjos are the instruments of the mornent here. It’s unadulterated hayseed stuff, but with a sense of playfulness that fans of any musical genre can appreciate."

== Chart performance ==
"It Won't Hurt" debuted at number 64 on the U.S. Billboard Hot Country Singles & Tracks for the week of November 15, 1986.

Chart (1986–1987)	Peak position
US Hot Country Songs (Billboard)	31
Canadian RPM Country Tracks	7

== Demo Version ==
A demo version of the song can be found on Yoakam's 2002 boxed set, Reprise Please, Baby, as well as his 2006 reissue of "Guitars, Cadillacs, Etc., Etc."
