= Orange Blossom Special (train) =

American passenger train

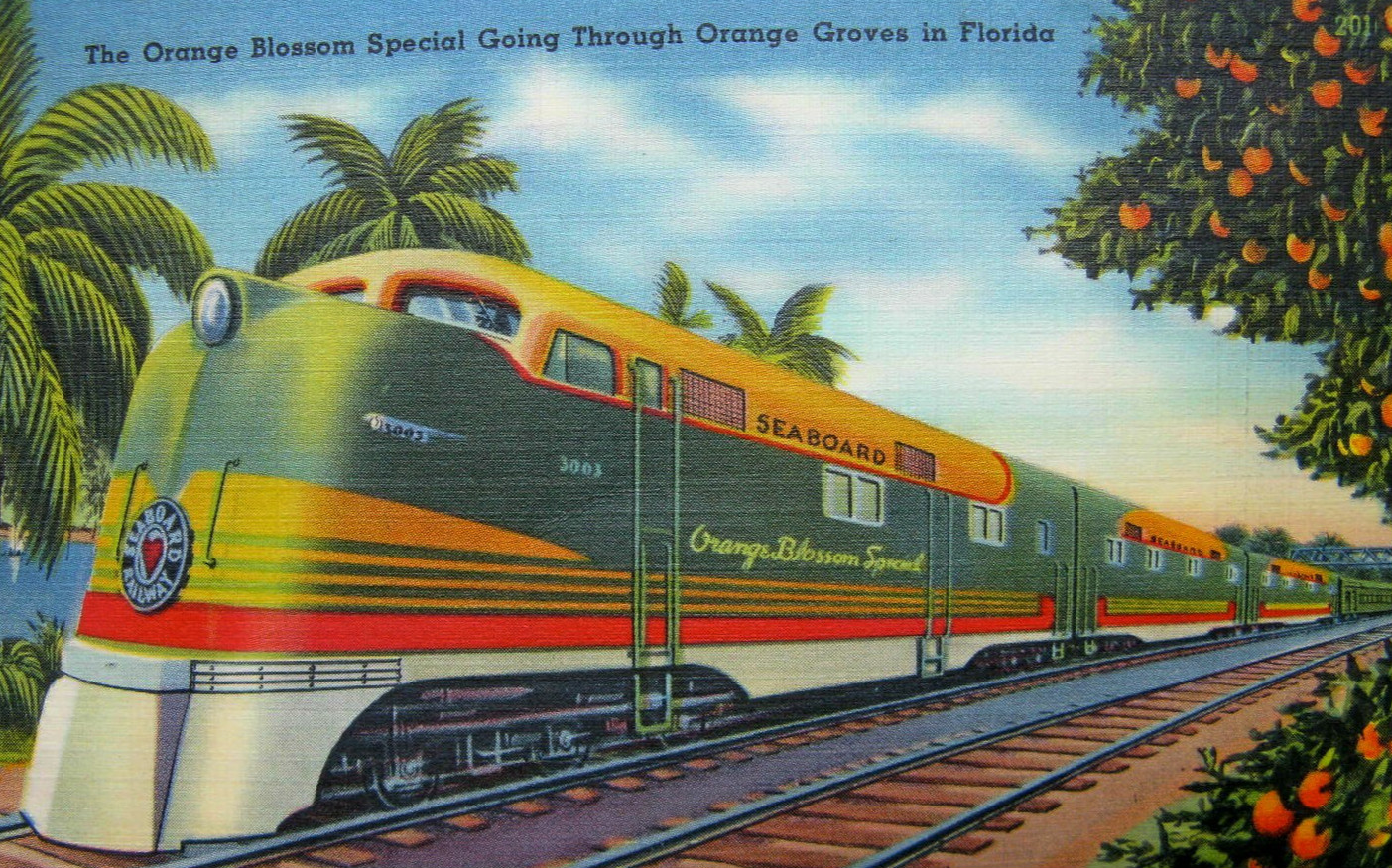
- Postcard depiction of the train circa 1939; the card described the train as the only all-electric New York-Florida train, a reference to its diesel-electric locomotives.

Overview
- Service type: Inter-city rail
- Status: Discontinued
- Locale: Northeastern United States; Southeastern United States
- First service: November 21, 1925
- Last service: 1953
- Former operator: Seaboard Air Line Railroad

Route
- Termini: New York, New York; Miami, Florida with alternate sections to St. Petersburg and Venice
- Distance travelled: 1,388.7 miles (2,234.9 km)
- Service frequency: (Seasonal winter train; daily operation during operating season)
- Train numbers: 7 (southbound); 8 (northbound)

On-board services
- Sleeping arrangements: All Pullman - Open sections, drawing-rooms and compartments (1941)
- Catering facilities: Dining car
- Observation facilities: Club car and lounge car

Technical
- Track gauge: 1,435 mm (4 ft 8 1/2 in)

The Orange Blossom Special was a deluxe passenger train on the Seaboard Air Line Railroad connecting railroads between New York City and Miami in the United States. It ran during the winter season only.

It covered 1,388.7 miles (2,234.9 km) on the Pennsylvania Railroad from New York City to Washington, D.C., the Richmond, Fredericksburg and Potomac Railroad from Washington to Richmond, and the Seaboard Air Line Railroad from Richmond via Raleigh, Columbia, and Savannah to Miami. A section also went to Tampa and St. Petersburg.

== History ==
The train started on November 21, 1925, and was the brainchild of SAL president S. Davies Warfield, who wanted to capitalize on booming development in Florida at the time. Warfield believed Florida was a land of opportunity, and with fast, luxurious trains he could lure influential (not to mention wealthy) travelers to the Sunshine State. In February 1926 the train took 35 hours to run from New York to West Palm Beach (Seaboard track did not reach Miami until 1927).

Spurred by the success of Henry Flagler and his rival Florida East Coast Railway in attracting travelers, the Orange Blossom Special became famous in its own right.

It was renowned for its speed and luxury. E. M. Frimbo, "The World's Greatest Railway Buff", offered this account of a dining car chef who had worked aboard the train:

Our chef...spent nine of his forty-three years with the Pennsylvania Railroad as chef on the celebrated all-Pullman New York-to-Florida train the Orange Blossom Special—the most luxurious winter-season train ever devised by man. Nothing even remotely resembling a can opener was allowed on the premises. All the pies, cakes, rolls, birthday cakes were baked on board under his supervision. Cut flowers and fresh fish were taken on at every revictualing stop, and the train carried thirty-five hundred dollars' worth of wine, liquor and champagne—these at pre-Prohibition prices—for each run.

The service was suspended during World War II to free the equipment up for carrying troops. Its last run was in 1953. This west Florida market is now handled by Amtrak's Silver Star.

In early 2012, a similar locomotive painted to resemble a locomotive of the time and lettered Orange Blossom Special was moved in from its longtime display location at the Church Street Station in Orlando, Florida, to the Florida Railroad Museum in nearby Tampa. Plans are for a multi-year restoration to active status for eventual excursion service.

== The song ==
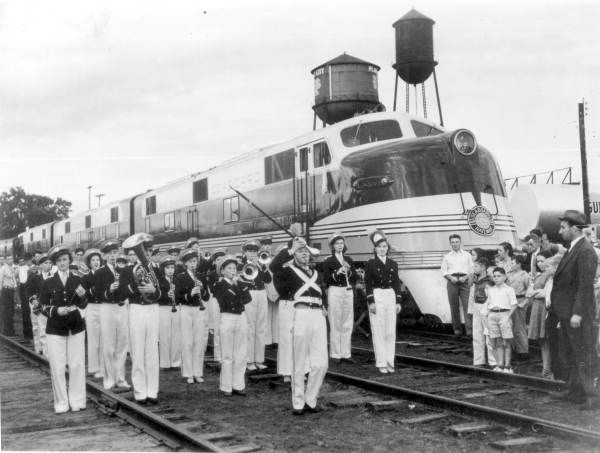
Arrival of the Orange Blossom Special, December 1938 in Plant City, Florida.

In 1938, Ervin T. Rouse copyrighted a song named after the train, although Chubby Wise (later the fiddle player for Bill Monroe's Blue Grass Boys) claimed that he co-wrote the song with Rouse, and let him have songwriting credit. It was first recorded by Ervin and his brother Gordon's group, the Rouse Brothers, one year later. Bill Monroe recorded the song in 1942 (with Art Wooten on fiddle) and popularized the tune. Johnny Cash named his 1965 album after the song. The song was also recorded by Bill Ramsey and Don Paulin.

== Accident ==
On January 11, 1949 at Bay Lake, Florida, the Orange Blossom Special had an overheated bearing on a traction motor on the Diesel locomotive, which seized up and caused a derailment. There was one death and 76 injured. Twenty days later at Rock, Michigan, a similar accident would happen on the Peninsula 400, which also had an overheated bearing on a failed traction motor that caused a derailment. There was one death and 15 injured.
