= They'll Never Take Her Love from Me =

Single by Hank Williams With His Drifting Cowboys
- A-side: "Why Should We Try Anymore"
- Published: August 2, 1950 Acuff-Rose Publications, Inc.
- Released: August 1950
- Recorded: June 14, 1950
- Studio: Castle Studio, Nashville
- Genre: Country
- Length: 2:44
- Label: MGM 10760
- Songwriter: Leon Payne
- Producer: Fred Rose

Hank Williams With His Drifting Cowboys singles chronology
| "Why Don't You Love Me" (1950) | "They'll Never Take Her Love from Me" (1950) | "Moanin' the Blues" (1950) |

"They'll Never Take Her Love from Me" is a country song popularized by Hank Williams in 1950. In 1961, Johnny Horton also had a hit with the song, and many others have covered it.

The song was first recorded by singer-songwriter Leon Payne in 1948, but it wasn't released until 1949 on the Bullet label.

== Background ==
Leon Payne wrote hundreds of country songs in a prolific career that lasted from 1941 until his death in 1969. He is perhaps best known for his hits "I Love You Because", "You've Still Got a Place in My Heart," and for two songs Williams recorded: "Lost Highway" and "They'll Never Take Her Love from Me."

Williams cut the song on June 14, 1950, at Castle Studio in Nashville, with Fred Rose producing and backing from Sammy Pruett (lead guitar), Jack Shook or Rusty Gabbard (rhythm guitar), Don Helms (steel guitar), Jerry Rivers (fiddle), and Ernie Newton (bass). The song was released as the flipside to Williams' own "Why Should We Try Anymore," but Payne's song outperformed the A-side, peaking at number 5, while "Why Should We Try Anymore" rose to number 9. As Williams biographer Colin Escott observes, "The message was clear: the public wanted brisk, up-temp juke joint songs. History might decide that Hank Williams was the finest writer and singer of 'heart' songs in all country music, but that wasn't what radio and jukebox audiences wanted in 1950."

Kentucky historian W. Lynn Nickell asserted in 2012 that Paul Gilley was responsible for the lyrics to "They'll Never Take Her Love from Me," as well as several other country song hits. Gilley supposedly gave the handwritten lyric sheet to a neighbor girl, telling her the song would soon be playing on the radio and that it was proof that he had written it.

== Cover versions ==
- Johnny Horton recorded the song, releasing it as the B-side to "Sleepy-Eyed John". The record debuted on Billboard's country and Western chart in April 1961, rising to number 9, and staying on the chart for eight weeks.
- George Jones cut the song for his 1962 LP My Favorites of Hank Williams.
- Don Gibson covered the song.
- Mac Wiseman included the song on his 1976 album Country Music Memories.
- Mel McDaniel covered the song on his 1978 album Mello.
- Elvis Costello recorded the song during sessions that became his 1986 album King of America. It as appears as a bonus track on the 1995 re-release.
- The song is featured on the album Ol' Waylon Sings Ol' Hank by Waylon Jennings.
- The song appears on the 1995 Willie Nelson box set A Classic and Unreleased Collection.
- Footage of Elliott Smith performing the song in Fargo, North Dakota in 1997 can be found on YouTube.
- Doug Sahm recorded the song for his 2001 album The Return of Wayne Douglas.
