= 16 Biggest Hits (Johnny Cash and June Carter Cash album) =

Greatest hits album by Johnny Cash and June Carter Cash
- Released: February 21, 2006
- Genre: Country
- Label: Legacy Recordings

Johnny Cash chronology
June Carter and Johnny Cash: Duets (2006)	16 Biggest Hits (2006)	Personal File (2006)

June Carter Cash chronology
June Carter and Johnny Cash: Duets (2006)	16 Biggest Hits (2006)	Early June (2006)

June Carter and Johnny Cash: Duets cover

Professional ratings
Review scores
Source	Rating
Allmusic	3/5 stars

16 Biggest Hits is a 2006 Johnny Cash and June Carter Cash compilation album. It is part of a series of similar 16 Biggest Hits albums released by Legacy Recordings. It has sold 333,000 copies in the US as of May 2013. It was also released under the title June Carter and Johnny Cash: Duets.

== Track listing ==
No.	Title	Writer(s)	Length
1.	"It Ain't Me Babe"	Bob Dylan	3:04
2.	"Jackson"	Jerry Leiber, Billy Edd Wheeler	2:46
3.	"Long-Legged Guitar Pickin' Man"	Marshall Grant	2:35
4.	"Oh, What a Good Thing We Had"	June Carter Cash, Johnny Cash	2:44
5.	"Darlin' Companion"	John Sebastian	2:15
6.	"If I Were a Carpenter"	Tim Hardin	3:01
7.	"'Cause I Love You"	Cash	2:33
8.	"The Loving Gift"	Kris Kristofferson	2:15
9.	"Help Me Make It Through the Night"	Kristofferson	2:58
10.	"The Pine Tree"	Wheeler	2:55
11.	"No Need to Worry"	J.S. Cooper, G.P. White	2:51
12.	"Old Time Feeling"	Tom Jans, Will Jennings	2:50
13.	"One Way Rider"	Rodney Crowell	3:18
14.	"Brand New Dance"	Paul Kennerley	3:26
15.	"Far Side Banks of Jordan"	Terry Smith	2:42
16.	"It Takes One to Know Me"	Carlene Carter	3:35

== Chart performance ==
16 Biggest Hits peaked at #26 on the U.S. Billboard Top Country Albums chart in 2006 and #126 on the Billboard 200.

Chart (2006)	Peak position
U.S. Billboard Top Country Albums	26
U.S. Billboard 200	126
