= Guitars, Cadillacs, Etc., Etc. =

Studio album by Dwight Yoakam
- Released: March 12, 1986 (Original); October 17, 2006 (Deluxe)
- Studios: Excalibur (Studio City, California); Capitol Studio B (Hollywood)
- Genre: Country
- Length: 31:34
- Label: Reprise
- Producer: Pete Anderson

Dwight Yoakam chronology
Guitars, Cadillacs, Etc., Etc. (1986)	Hillbilly Deluxe (1987)

Singles from Guitars, Cadillacs, Etc., Etc
- 1. "Honky Tonk Man" Released: January 27, 1986; 2. "Guitars, Cadillacs" Released: June 30, 1986; 3. "It Won't Hurt" Released: November 3, 1986

Guitars, Cadillacs, Etc., Etc. is the debut studio album by American country music artist Dwight Yoakam. This was Yoakam's first time working with long-time collaborator, record producer-guitarist Pete Anderson. The album became the first of three consecutive albums by Yoakam to reach number one on the Billboard Top Country Albums chart.

== Background ==
When he began his career, Nashville was oriented toward pop "urban cowboy" music, and Yoakam's brand of hip honky tonk music was not considered marketable. He later recalled, "Mid-eighties it was pretty pop-country. Early to mid-eighties. But there were some great beacons of light for traditional country music on the scene at the time. George Strait had had several hits at that point. Ricky Skaggs was a real beacon for everybody in my generation who wanted to point to the fact that traditional country music could still sell, and still was pertinent to an audience. I think it’s incumbent upon the individual artist in any given generation to maintain their contact with the traditional forms and the fundamental aspects of any genre." A Kentucky native, Yoakam grew up listening to records by Stonewall Jackson and Johnny Cash, while also being influenced by rock acts like The Byrds and Creedence Clearwater Revival, but the Bakersfield sound, typified by country artists like Buck Owens and Merle Haggard, had a lasting influence on his musical direction and songwriting. After not making much headway in Nashville, he moved to Los Angeles and worked towards bringing his particular brand of new honky-tonk, or "hillbilly" music (as he called it), forward into the 1980s. Writing all his own songs, and continuing to perform mostly outside traditional country music channels, he did many shows in rock and punk rock clubs around Los Angeles, playing with roots rock or punk rock acts like the Blasters, Los Lobos, and X. This helped him diversify his audience beyond the typical country music fans, and his authentic, honky-tonk revivalism brought rock audiences closer to country music. In the 2003 documentary series Lost Highway, Yoakam states, "We were reinterpreting the Bakersfield 'shuffle sound' of Buck Owens and what he was doing with that terse kind of shuffle."

== Recording ==
Yoakam's debut was produced by guitarist Pete Anderson, whose abilities as an arranger complimented the singer's skills as a songwriter. As Anderson later recalled, "Dwight’s a brilliant lyricist, with a great voice as a gift from God. And a gift for composition. He didn’t struggle to write…And at the time, he didn’t want to do any of the things I wanted to do, and I didn’t want to do any of things he wanted to do, which made it non-competitive." Comparing the recordings with Anderson on his debut with the demos the singer recorded in Los Angeles in 1981, writer Don McLeese observes:

By catching the attention of Pete Anderson, Yoakam found the sonic architect who could frame his voice, provide an instrumental foil with a stinging guitar, and streamline his arrangements to the best advantage. It’s mainly hindsight that makes those 1981 arrangements sound busy, as if the guitars and fiddles were chasing each other’s tails, but what Anderson added was clearly crucial, making the sound as important as the songs…Whatever polish Pete provided, his guitar gave Yoakam’s songs more raw intensity than anything on those 1981 sessions.

Guitars, Cadillacs, Etc., Etc. originally appeared as a six-track 12-inch EP version released in 1984 through a tiny independent label Oak Records. In the notes to the four-disc Reprise Please Baby box set, Yoakam explained his musical dynamic like this: "You combine drummers with mountain people, and you’ve got hillbilly music. That’s what we’re doing: Bill Monroe with drums." Regarding the recordings, Anderson later commented that he was particularly concerned with "making it cohesive in terms of intros, outros, and solos, that was done on that record, every song." The EP's success led to Yoakam being signed by Warner Bros. and releasing the same EP with four additional tracks and nearly identical packaging, making him one of the few artists whose major-label debut carried the note that it contained previously released material.

== Composition ==
Yoakam composed seven of the album's ten songs, including the title track, which Rolling Stone magazine ranked number 94 in their list of the 100 greatest country songs. The song, with Anderson's Don Rich-influenced guitar style, walks the Buck Owens line until the line extends to Yoakam, and Yoakam's street poetry is both poignant and profound, built into a barroom anthem. According to Don McLeese's book Dwight Yoakam: A Thousand Miles from Nowhere, it was not until the expansion into the Reprise LP that the singer was inspired to write the song "Guitars, Cadillacs," with the "and hillbilly music" replacing the "etceteras" that appeared on the original EP cover, and the executives at Warner Bros. balked, fearing that the Kentucky-born artist's evocation of what the label considered trailer trash "was like waving a rebel flag at the possibility of mainstream success." Steve Earle, who rose to fame around the same time as Yoakam and included a song he wrote called "Hillbilly Highway" on his 1986 breakout album Guitar Town, later observed, "What we had in common is that we use the term 'hillbilly,' which pissed George Jones off. He said one time, 'We spent all these years trying not to be called hillbillies, and Dwight Yoakam and Steve Earle fucked it up in one day.'" McLeese writes:

The "hillbilly" tag was something that country had made a concerted effort to ditch, from the countrypolitan sophistication of Chet Atkins and Billy Sherrill productions through the slick suburbanization of Urban Cowboy. And here was this punk upstart, tracking manure all over the split-level home that country music had built for itself, reminding listeners of the music’s outhouse era. "They asked Pete if he could get me to change it, take the hillbilly out," says Yoakam. "And Pete knew better. He said, "No way."

Other songs, such as the "stone country" barroom lament "It Won’t Hurt" and the heartfelt ballad "South of Cincinnati," display Yoakam's remarkable depth and understanding of country songwriting and storytelling, with the latter putting "an interesting twist on the songwriter’s dual heritage in urban Ohio and rural Kentucky…one that evokes the palpable change that occurs below the Mason-Dixon line, ‘south of Cincinnati, down where the dogwood trees grow.’" Larry Flick of Billboard magazine called "It Won't Hurt" a "classic hurtin' and drinkin' song convincingly sung." The bluegrass-influenced "Miner’s Prayer" also looks to Kentucky, an acoustic number powered by dobro (courtesy of David Mansfield), flat-picked guitar, and Yoakam's singing of his grandfather and generations like him who lived and died in the mines of Kentucky, which AllMusic critic Thom Jurek describes as "Bill Monroe meets Ralph Stanley meets Bob Dylan." (Yoakam would later record the song with Stanley.) The prideful "Bury Me," another Yoakam original, had been demoed in 1981 and was rerecorded as a duet with Lone Justice vocalist Maria McKee. Yoakam later told Rolling Stone the song was "basically a bluegrass in hiding." "Twenty Years" tells the vindictive tale of Henry, a man whose life is ruined after the woman he crossed lies in a district court, framing him for a crime he did not commit. ("Tried to warn you, Henry, not to cross her/Tried to tell you about her vengeful ways...")

After signing with Reprise, Yoakam and Anderson added four additional cuts to the original EP, the most significant being a cover of Johnny Horton’s 1956 hit "Honky Tonk Man," which would kick off the major label LP and spend six months on the country charts, peaking at number 3. Along with being his first hit, Yoakam’s "Honky Tonk Man" has the unique bragging rights of being the very first country-music video ever played on MTV. The two other cover songs on the album, Harlan Howard's "Heartaches by the Number," originally made famous by Ray Price, and June Carter’s "Ring of Fire," the Johnny Cash classic, remained faithful to the spirit of country music but sounded brand new at the same time, placing Yoakam at the vanguard of what became known as the "New Traditionalist" movement alongside he likes of Randy Travis and Steve Earle. As one writer noted about "Heartaches by the Number," "Because of Ed Black's steel playing, Brantley Kearns' fiddle, and Anderson's guitar, the accompaniment is stronger and far edgier than the Ray Price version, but from Yoakam's throat comes an entirely different story than Price's. In Price's case the song was a plea; in Yoakam's it's a statement of fact."

The album was re-issued on October 17, 2006, complete with demos from 1981 and tracks recorded live at the Roxy Theatre on Los Angeles' Sunset Strip in 1986.

== Reception ==
Professional ratings
Review scores
Source	Rating
AllMusic	5/5 stars

Three of the album's tracks reached the top 40 of the Hot Country Singles chart in 1986. Yoakam's first single, "Honky Tonk Man", peaked at number three. The follow-up was the title track, peaking at number four. His third single, "It Won't Hurt", made it to number 31. Yoakam was nominated for two Grammy awards in association with Guitars, Cadillacs, Etc., Etc. and he won Top New Male Vocalist at the 1986 Academy of Country Music Awards.

Spin wrote, "These bouncy tunes are filled with images of men drinking whiskey and falling off barstools, of Jezebels ruining good-hearted lunks. It's unadulterated hayseed stuff, but with a sense of playfulness." AllMusic called it, "An astonishing debut, Guitars, Cadillacs, Etc., Etc. changed the face of country music single-handedly and remains one hell of a party record.

== Track listing ==
=== Original Oak EP (1984) track listing ===
All songs by Dwight Yoakam except as indicated. All arrangements by Pete Anderson & Dwight Yoakam.

Side one

1. "It Won't Hurt" – 3:03
2. "South of Cincinnati" – 4:54
3. "I'll Be Gone" – 2:44

Side two

1. "Twenty Years" – 2:40
2. "Ring of Fire" (June Carter, Merle Kilgore) – 3:13
3. "Miner's Prayer" – 2:17

=== Original Reprise LP (1986) track listing ===
All songs by Dwight Yoakam except as indicated. All arrangements by Pete Anderson & Dwight Yoakam.

Side one

1. "Honky Tonk Man" (Johnny Horton, Tillman Franks, Howard Hausey) – 2:48
2. "It Won't Hurt" – 3:03
3. "I'll Be Gone" – 2:44
4. "South of Cincinnati" – 4:54
5. "Bury Me" (duet with Maria McKee) – 3:19

Side two

1. "Guitars, Cadillacs" – 3:02
2. "Twenty Years" – 2:40
3. "Ring of Fire" (June Carter, Merle Kilgore) – 3:13
4. "Miner's Prayer" – 2:17
5. "Heartaches by the Number" (Harlan Howard) – 3:13

=== Reprise/Rhino 'Deluxe Edition' Reissue (2006) track listing ===
Disc 1

Original 1981 demos (tracks 1 – 10)

1. "This Drinkin' Will Kill Me" (Demo)
2. "It Won't Hurt" (Demo)
3. "I'll Be Gone" (Demo)
4. "Floyd County" (Demo)
5. "You're The One" (Demo)
6. "Twenty Years" (Demo)
7. "Please Daddy" (Demo)
8. "Miner's Prayer" (Demo)
9. "I Sang Dixie" (Demo)
10. "Bury Me" (Demo)

Guitars, Cadillacs, Etc., Etc. (tracks 11 – 20)

1. "Honky Tonk Man"
2. "It Won't Hurt"
3. "I'll Be Gone"
4. "South Of Cincinnati"
5. "Bury Me" (duet with Maria McKee)
6. "Guitars, Cadillacs"
7. "Twenty Years"
8. "Ring of Fire"
9. "Miner's Prayer"
10. "Heartaches by the Number"

Disc 2

Live at the Roxy, Hollywood, California, March 1986

1. "Can't You Hear Me Calling" (Live)
2. "Honky Tonk Man" (Live)
3. "Guitars, Cadillacs" (Live)
4. "Rocky Road Blues" (Live)
5. "Heartaches by the Number" (Live)
6. "I'll Be Gone" (Live)
7. "It Won't Hurt" (Live)
8. "My Bucket's Got a Hole in It" (Live)
9. "South of Cincinnati" (Live)
10. "Mystery Train" (Live)
11. "Ring of Fire" (Live)
12. "Since I Started Drinking Again" (Live)

== Personnel ==
- Dwight Yoakam – lead vocals, background vocals, acoustic guitar
- Pete Anderson – electric guitar, six-string bass guitar, background vocals
- Jay Dee Maness – pedal steel guitar
- Ed Black – lap steel guitar
- David Mansfield – dobro, mandolin
- JD Foster – bass guitar, background vocals
- Jeff Donavan – drums
- Brantley Kearns – fiddle, background vocals
- Gene Taylor – piano
- Glen Hardin – piano
- Herb Pedersen – background vocals
- Maria McKee – background vocals on "Bury Me"
- Antoinette Laumer Sales – Cover Art Designer

== Charts ==
=== Weekly charts ===
Chart (1986)	Peak position
Australia Albums (Kent Music Report)	89
US Billboard 200	61
US Top Country Albums (Billboard)	1

=== Year-end charts ===
Chart (1986)	Position
US Top Country Albums (Billboard)	5

== Certifications ==
Region	Certification	Certified units/sales
Australia (ARIA)	Gold	35,000^{^}
^{^} Shipments figures based on certification alone.
