= Guitars, Cadillacs =

Single by Dwight Yoakam

from the album Guitars, Cadillacs, Etc., Etc.
- B-side: "I'll Be Gone"
- Released: June 30, 1986
- Recorded: 1986
- Genre: Country
- Length: 3:02
- Label: Reprise 728688
- Songwriter: Dwight Yoakam
- Producer: Pete Anderson

Dwight Yoakam singles chronology
"Honky Tonk Man" (1986)	"Guitars, Cadillacs" (1986)	"It Won't Hurt" (1986)

"Guitars, Cadillacs" is a song written and recorded by American country music artist Dwight Yoakam. It was released in June 1986 as the second single and partial title track from his debut album Guitars, Cadillacs, Etc., Etc.. It peaked at number 4 in the United States, and number 2 in Canada.

== Music video ==
The music video was directed and produced by Sherman Halsey, and features Dwight Yoakam at a concert.

== Critical reception ==
Larry Flick of Billboard magazine reviewed the song favorably, saying that its "walking bass, twangy guitar, fiddle, and Yoakam's voice make it a pure hillbilly delight."

In June 2014, Rolling Stone magazine ranked "Guitars, Cadillacs" #94 in their list of the 100 greatest country songs. In an updated 2024 ranking by the publication that expanded the list to 200 songs, "Guitars, Cadillacs" placed at #137.

== In popular culture ==
The song plays during the bar scene in the 1991 science fiction action film Terminator 2: Judgment Day when the T-800 walks into a biker bar looking for clothes to wear and means of transportation; this scene has been omitted from some television airings. It was also featured in the film Dutch released the same year. The song made another appearance in the 2019 film Terminator: Dark Fate, as a homage to its presence in Terminator 2. The song also shows up in the most recent video game Terminator 2D: No Fate. In the bar scene American rock group the Protomen covered the song for "William Shakespeare Presents: Terminator the Second", a parody of Terminator 2 consisting entirely of lines from Shakespearean works. The song is featured on the soundtrack of the play.

== Chart performance ==
"Guitars, Cadillacs" debuted at number 54 on the U.S. Billboard Hot Country Singles & Tracks for the week of July 12, 1986.

Chart (1986)	Peak position
US Hot Country Songs (Billboard)	4
Canadian RPM Country Tracks	2
