= I Overlooked an Orchid =

1950 song first recorded by Carl Smith

Single by Carl Smith
- B-side: "I Betcha My Heart I Love You"
- Released: 1950
- Recorded: 1950
- Genre: Country
- Length: 2:58
- Label: Columbia
- Songwriter: see text

Carl Smith singles chronology
| "Guilty Conscience" (1950) | "I Overlooked an Orchid" (1950) | "Let's Live a Little" (1951) |

"I Overlooked an Orchid"

Single by Mickey Gilley

from the album Room Full of Roses
- B-side: "Swinging Doors"
- Released: June 1974
- Genre: Country
- Length: 2:54
- Label: Playboy
- Songwriter: see text
- Producer: Eddie Kilroy

Mickey Gilley singles chronology
| "Room Full of Roses" (1974) | "I Overlooked an Orchid" (1974) | "City Lights" (1974) |

"I Overlooked an Orchid" is a country song that was a hit for Mickey Gilley in 1974. It was first recorded by Carl Smith in 1950, achieving only modest sales when it was released as a single through Columbia Records. Country act Johnnie & Jack recorded the song in 1962 as part of their album Smiles and Tears, then it was released as the B-side to their single "Bye Bye Love" in early 1963.

Various people are credited with writing the song. Carl Smith has been named co-writer along with Arthur Q. Smith and Shirly Lyn. "Shirly Lyn" is a pseudonym of songwriter Troy Lee Martin, who wrote under several names. Carl Story was recorded telling a disc jockey that he wrote the song, but Carl Smith denied this version of events, pointing instead to Arthur Q. Smith as the co-writer. Kentucky historian W. Lynn Nickell asserted that Kentuckian Paul Gilley (no relation to Mickey Gilley) wrote the lyrics and sold them along with all the rights so that he could not take songwriting credit.

"I Overlooked an Orchid" was recorded by American country music artist Mickey Gilley, released in June 1974 as the second single from the album Room Full of Roses. "I Overlooked an Orchid" was Mickey Gilley's second country hit and second number one on the country chart. The single stayed at number one for a week and spent a total of fourteen weeks on the country chart. The Gilley version had a small amount of crossover interest, peaking at number 104 in the Cashbox "Looking Ahead" survey, in August 1974.

== Chart performance ==
| Chart (1974) | Peak position |
|---|---|
| US Hot Country Songs (Billboard) | 1 |
| Canadian RPM Country Tracks | 15 |
