= Maytown, Kentucky =

Census-designated place in Kentucky, United States

- Census-designated place
- Location in Kentucky
- Coordinates: 37.848968°N 83.472279°W
- Country: United States
- State: Kentucky
- County: Morgan County, Kentucky

Area
  - Total: 0.57 sq mi (1.48 km^{2})
  - Land: 0.57 sq mi (1.48 km^{2})
  - Water: 0 sq mi (0.00 km^{2})
- Elevation: 935 ft (285 m)

Population (2020)
  - Total: 13
- Time zone: UTC-5 (Eastern (EST))
  - Summer (DST): UTC-4 (EDT)
- Zip Code: 41425
- Area code: 606

Maytown is an unincorporated community and census-designated place in Morgan County, Kentucky, United States. As of the 2020 census, Maytown had a population of 227.

== Geography and history ==
Maytown is located just south of Ezel, Kentucky. It is home to the Carl and Norma Lil' Opry House and the old gas station run by the two. It hosted a church but is no longer in operation. There is a small sawmill east of Maytown that is still in use, however. The town's primary power source is the Maytown Power Station, due north of Ezel. It is commonly confused with the city in Floyd County of the same name.

== Demographics ==
Census Pop.
Census	Pop.	Note	%±
2020	227		—
U.S. Decennial Census

== Notable people ==
Songwriter Paul Gilley (1929–1957) was born in Maytown.
