= Duo de Twang =

American country duo

- Also known as: Les Claypool's Duo de Twang
- Genres: Bluegrass; country
- Years active: 2012–present
- Labels: ATO, Prawn Song
- Spinoff of: Primus, M.I.R.V.
- Members: Les Claypool; Bryan Kehoe
- Website: lesclaypool.com

Duo de Twang is an American country duo formed in 2012. It features Primus bass guitarist Les Claypool and M.I.R.V. guitarist Bryan Kehoe, who has been Claypool's friend since high school.

== History ==
The duo was originally conceived as a one-off gig for Hardly Strictly Bluegrass music festival in San Francisco. Claypool decided to continue with the band after a camping trip he took with his son. The band started performing at various venues and festivals, including McKittrick Hotel and Jam Cruise.

The band released its debut album, Four Foot Shack, on February 4, 2014, via ATO Records. The album features original songs and covers from various artists, including Bee Gees and Alice in Chains, as well as Primus, Claypool's own band.

== Musical style ==
The band's inspirations include jazz guitarist Django Reinhardt, country musicians Johnny Horton, Jerry Reed and Vernon Dalhart, and "hillbilly music from the '30s and '40s." The band's music features a simple guitar and bass arrangement with occasional use of banjo and mini-tambourine. Duo de Twang's music has been classified as Americana, bluegrass, country, hillbilly and rock.

Claypool described the duo as "my fuck-off vacation band." He also stated: "I'm getting a chance to bullshit with the audience. You've got two guys that have to hold down the rhythm and you can't get too terribly melodic except with the vocals or whatnot."

== Band members ==
- Les Claypool - bass guitar, vocals, tambourine
- Bryan Kehoe - guitar

== Discography ==
Studio albums

- Four Foot Shack (2014, ATO Records)
