= Orange Blossom Special (song) =

- Dutch release picture sleeve

Single by Johnny Cash

from the album Orange Blossom Special
- B-side: "All of God's Children Ain't Free"
- Released: January 4, 1965
- Recorded: 1964
- Genre: Country; folk; bluegrass
- Length: 3:06
- Label: Columbia
- Songwriter: Ervin T. Rouse

Johnny Cash singles chronology
"Bad News" (1964)	"Orange Blossom Special" (1965)	"Mister Garfield" (1965)

"Orange Blossom Special" is a fiddle tune about the luxury passenger train of the same name. The song was written by Ervin T. Rouse (1917–1981) in 1938 and was first recorded by Rouse and his brother Gordon in 1939. Often called simply "The Special" or "OBS", the song is commonly referred to as "the fiddle player's national anthem".

== Importance ==
By the 1950s, "The Orange Blossom Special" had become a staple at bluegrass festivals.

For many years, "Orange Blossom Special" has been not only a train imitation piece, but also a vehicle to exhibit the fiddler's pyrotechnic virtuosity. Performed at breakneck tempos and with imitative embellishments that evoke train wheels and whistles, OBS is guaranteed to bring the blood of all but the most jaded listeners to a quick, rolling boil.
—Norm Cohen, author, Long Steel Rail: The Railroad in American Folksong

== Authorship ==
Rouse copyrighted the song before the Orange Blossom Special train ever came to Jacksonville. Other musicians, including Robert Russell "Chubby" Wise, have claimed authorship of the song. Wise did not write it although he claimed for years that he had. Rouse, a mild-mannered man who lived deep in the Everglades, never contested the matter. Years later, Johnny Cash learned of Rouse and brought him to Miami to play the song at a Cash concert. In a video on YouTube, Gene Christian, a fiddler for Bill Monroe who knew both men, confirms that Rouse wrote and copyrighted the song. Christian says in the interview that Chubby Wise popularized the song by playing it weekly on the Grand Ole Opry.

As Wise tells the story, he and Rouse decided to visit the Jacksonville Terminal in Florida to tour the Orange Blossom Special train.

... even though it was about three in the morning we went right into the Terminal and got on board and toured that train, and it was just about the most luxurious thing I had ever seen. Ervin was impressed, too. And when we got done lookin' 'er over he said, "Let's write a song about it." So we went over to my place ... and that night she was born. Sitting on the side of my bed. We wrote the melody in less than an hour, and called it Orange Blossom Special. Later Ervin and his brother put some words to it.

Rouse copyrighted the song in 1938 and recorded it in 1939. Bill Monroe, regarded by many as "the father of bluegrass music", recorded the song (with Art Wooten on fiddle) and made it a hit. Since then countless versions have been recorded, among them Wise's own, as an instrumental in a 1969 album Chubby Wise and His Fiddle. And that version, said Wise, "is the way it was written and the way it's supposed to be played".

Leon "Pappy" Selph in this interview dated 1997 that he authored the song in 1931.

== Lyrics ==
The lyrics of the song are in the 12-bar blues form but the full piece is more elaborate.

Look a-yonder comin'
Comin' down that railroad track
Hey, look a-yonder comin'
Comin' down that railroad track
It's the Orange Blossom Special
Bringin' my baby back

Well, I'm going down to Florida
And get some sand in my shoes
Or maybe Californy
And get some sand in my shoes
I'll ride that Orange Blossom Special
And lose these New York blues

"Say man, when you going back to Florida?"
"When am I goin' back to Florida? I don't know, don't reckon I ever will."
"Ain't you worried about getting your nourishment in New York?"
"Well, I don't care if I do-die-do-die-do-die-do-die."

Hey talk about a-ramblin'
She's the fastest train on the line
Talk about a-travellin'
She's the fastest train on the line
It's that Orange Blossom Special
Rollin' down the Seaboard line

The lyrics of the first verse are very reminiscent of the Jimmie Rodgers song "Freight Whistle Blues".

== Cover versions ==
- In 1961, Swedish group The Spotnicks released an instrumental guitar version of the bluegrass classic that was a hit in Australia, the UK, and other European countries.
- In 1966, Chet Atkins recorded his version along with the Boston Pops Orchestra with Arthur Fiedler as conductor for The 'Pops' Goes Country album.
- Vassar Clements with the Nitty Gritty Dirt Band on their Will the Circle be Unbroken album.
- The americana/bluegrass/rock fusion band Seatrain recorded and released it in 1970. This version features Richard Green (formerly with Bill Monroe; Monroe stated: "nobody plays "Orange Blossom Special" like Richard) on fiddle and Peter Rowan on vocals. Dave Swarbrick (best known from Fairport Convention) recorded and released a very similar version a few years later.
- The Moody Brothers' Grammy-nominated country instrumental "The Great Train Song Medley" featured their father Dwight Moody playing fiddle on "Orange Blossom Special".
- A version by Doug Kershaw peaked at #9 on the RPM Country Tracks chart in Canada in 1970.
- Charlie McCoy recorded a harmonica-led cover of the song that peaked at #26 on the Billboard Hot Country Songs chart in 1973.
- Charlie Daniels's 1974 Platinum album Fire On The Mountain contains an instrumental live performance recorded at the War Memorial Auditorium in Nashville, Tennessee on October 4, 1974.
- Electric Light Orchestra also covered the song in their early shows. One of these performances was released on their 1974 live album The Night the Light Went On in Long Beach, following a violin improvisation by Mik Kaminski.
- Billy Vaughn and his orchestra covered the song with an instrumental version in 1961, a highly regarded take.
- James Last first released a cover on the 1977 album called Western Party. It became so popular it was played at every live concert until Last's death in 2015.
- Buddy Greene recorded a harmonica-led version in 1994.
- Augustin Hadelich, Italian-German-American Grammy-winning classical violinist, plays an arrangement of Orange Blossom Special as an encore at classical music concerts.

== See also ==
- Orange Blossom Special (train)
- List of train songs

== Video ==
- Don Rich, instrumental version of Orange Blossom Special on YouTube
- Roy Clark performs The Orange Blossom Special 1987 Live on YouTube
- Orange Blossom Special by The Bluegrass Babies - children's animation with a soundtrack by The Rosinators on YouTube
- 9 Year Old Fiddler - Mikayla Roach - Orange Blossom Special on YouTube
- Orange Blossom Special sung by Redhill Billies, Somerset, UK on YouTube
- Silver Star Leaves Miami: The Orange Blossom Special performed by Ted the Fiddler, from the Hy Mayerson and Sean Corcoran travelogue Miami to New York
- Steve Martin playing "Orange Blossom Special" and "King Tut" at Jazz Fest 2010 on YouTube
