= Sleepy-Eyed John =

Country song by Tex Atchison

"They'll Never Take Her Love from Me"

Single by Johnny Horton
- B-side: "They'll Never Take Her Love from Me"
- Released: March 6, 1961
- Genre: Country
- Label: Columbia Records
- Songwriter(s): Tex Atchison

"Sleepy-Eyed John" is a song that was a million-selling hit for Johnny Horton in 1961.

== Overview ==
Written by left-handed fiddle player Tex Atchison, the song was first recorded in a Western swing style by Ole Rasmussen for Capitol Records in 1950, when Atchison played in Rasmussen's band, the Nebraska Cornhuskers, as they toured California. Billboard reviewed the 10-inch 78 rpm single, calling it a "real toe-tapper" appropriate for square dancing, with a "pert" vocal performance by Ted Wilds. Atchison may have based the song on a traditional Kentucky bluegrass tune known as "Get Up, John" or "Sleepy John".

The song's name was taken as the moniker of radio disc jockey John Lepley, who went by Sleepy-Eyed John. In the mid-1950s, Lepley held down the afternoon slot at Memphis station WHHM, and he promoted musical acts at a local entertainment complex called Clearpool, featuring Western swing bands at the Eagle's Nest stage. Lepley booked Elvis Presley to perform in 1954 – these early appearances helped Presley establish a fan base and his personal style.

Atchison's song saw its biggest success with Johnny Horton. Aided by a famous B-side – Horton's version of Hank Williams' "They'll Never Take Her Love from Me" – the 45 rpm record debuted on Billboard's Country and Western chart in late April 1961, rising to number 9, and staying on the chart for eight weeks.

A few months later, expatriate Tennessee country singer Johnny Duncan released a single of "Sleepy-Eyed John" on the Pye label in the UK, backed by his veteran UK band, the Blue Grass Boys. The flipside was another Atchison/Rasmussen tune: "I'm Still Bettin' on Love".

In 1972, the song was recorded by the Norwegian bluegrass group Christiania Fusel & Blaagress. The lyrics were translated into the Norwegian language to describe an eccentric villager with a wooden leg.

In the late 1990s, Bear Family Records issued a retrospective set of Rasmussen songs on Compact disc, the set titled Sleepy-Eyed John. The recordings were made during 1950–1952 when Rasmussen was signed to Capitol Records.
