= Honky-Tonk Man =

1956 song performed by Johnny Horton

Single by Johnny Horton
- B-side: "I'm Ready, If You're Willing"/"Words"
- Released: March 1956
- Recorded: January 11, 1956
- Studio: Bradley's Barn, Mount Juliet, Tennessee
- Genre: Rockabilly
- Length: 2:16
- Label: Columbia
- Songwriters: Johnny Horton, Tillman Franks, Howard Hausey
- Producer: Don Law

Johnny Horton singles chronology
"Honky-Tonk Man" (1956)	"I'm a One-Woman Man" (1956)

"Honky-Tonk Man" is a song co-written and recorded by American singer Johnny Horton. It was released in March 1956 as his debut single on Columbia Records, and the album of the same name reaching number 9 on the U.S. country singles charts. Horton re-released the song six years later, taking it to number 11 on the same chart.

== Background ==
Song-writing credits for "Honky-Tonk Man" have been attributed to Johnny Horton, Howard Hausey and Tillman Franks. In late-1955 Hausey, an aspiring songwriter, went to Shreveport, Louisiana (from where the Louisiana Hayride was broadcast) to pitch three of his songs to Johnny Horton. Horton and his manager, Tillman Franks, liked the up-tempo "Honky-Tonk Man", but before it was recorded a deal was negotiated to include Horton and Franks in the publishing royalties (both of whom may have assisted in re-fashioning the melody).

"Honky-Tonk Man" was recorded on January 11, 1956 at Bradley's Barn studio in Nashville. Session musicians on the recording were Grady Martin and Harold Bradley, as well as Bill Black (at the time Elvis Presley’s bassist). Soon afterwards "Honky-Tonk Man" was released as a single (Columbia label: 4-21504) paired with another song from the same session, "I'm Ready if You're Willing". Live shows were subsequently arranged to advertise the single, with the band featuring Tillman Franks on bass and Tommy Tomlinson on guitar.

== Critical reception ==
The single was reviewed in Billboard (March 10, 1956). The review commented on "Honky-Tonk Man" in the following terms:

The wine, women and song attractions exert a powerful hold on the singer, he admits. The funky sound and pounding beat in the backing suggest the kind of atmosphere he describes. A very good jukebox record.

== Content ==
The lyrics of the song are narrated in the first-person ("I'm a honky-tonk man"), describing a life of drinking and dancing with young women in honky-tonk bars; the account suggests a compulsive or addictive quality to the protagonist's lifestyle ("I can’t seem to stop"). The chorus of the song juxtaposes the narrator’s obsessive and exuberant behaviour with what happens when his "money’s all gone" ("I’m on the telephone callin’: ‘hey hey mama, can your daddy come home?’").

== Chart performance ==
Chart (1956)	Peak position
US Hot Country Songs (Billboard)	9

Chart (1962)	Peak position
US Hot Country Songs (Billboard)	11

== Bob Luman version ==
In 1970, Bob Luman took a cover version to number 22 on the country charts. It was included on his album Is It Any Wonder That I Love You, from which it was released as the first single. The song was Luman's sixteenth country chart single, spending 14 weeks on the charts.

Chart (1970)	Peak position
US Hot Country Songs (Billboard)	22

== Dwight Yoakam version ==
"Honky Tonk Man"

Single by Dwight Yoakam

from the album Guitars, Cadillacs, Etc., Etc.
- B-side: "Miner's Prayer"
- Released: January 27, 1986
- Genre: Country
- Length: 2:48
- Label: Reprise 8793
- Songwriters: Johnny Horton, Tillman Franks, Howard Hausey
- Producer: Pete Anderson

Dwight Yoakam singles chronology
"Honky Tonk Man" (1986)	"Guitars, Cadillacs" (1986)

Country music singer Dwight Yoakam released his version of the song as his debut single in 1986. Yoakam's version peaked at number 3 on the Hot Country Singles & Tracks chart; it appears on his debut album, Guitars, Cadillacs, Etc., Etc..

=== Chart performance ===
The song debuted at number 74 on the country chart dated March 1, 1986. It charted for 24 weeks on that chart, and peaked at number 3 on the chart dated June 14, 1986.

Chart (1986)	Peak position
US Hot Country Songs (Billboard)	3
Canadian RPM Country Tracks	1

=== Music video ===
This was Yoakam's first music video, and it was directed and produced by Sherman Halsey.
