= Ervin T. Rouse =

American songwriter

Ervin Thomas Rouse (September 18, 1917 – July 8, 1981) was an American fiddler and songwriter, largely known for his widely recorded "Orange Blossom Special" (1938). He also wrote the 1940s Moon Mullican hit "Sweeter Than The Flowers", which has also become a bluegrass standard.
