= Tillman Franks =

American songwriter

- Born: September 29, 1920; Stamps, Arkansas, US
- Died: October 26, 2006 (aged 86); Shreveport, Louisiana, US
- Resting place: Forest Park West Cemetery in Shreveport
- Occupations: Country music bassist/songwriter and manager
- Spouse: Virginia Helen Suber Franks (m. 1946)
- Awards: Rockabilly Hall of Fame, Louisiana Hall of Fame, Northwest Louisiana Walk of Stars

Tillman Ben Franks, Sr. (September 29, 1920 – October 26, 2006), was an American bassist, songwriter and artist manager whose roster included country music stars Johnny Horton, David Houston, Webb Pierce, Claude King, and the Carlisles.

Franks is a noted inductee to the Rockabilly Hall of Fame and was a longtime member of both the Grand Ole Opry and Louisiana Hayride

He, as a musician, served as the bassist for singers such as Jimmie Davis and Slim Whitman.

== Background ==
Franks was born in Stamps in Lafayette County in southwestern Arkansas, to George Watson Franks and the former Pearl Galloway. When he was two, Franks' family relocated to Shreveport in northwestern Louisiana, where they assumed residence in the Cedar Grove neighborhood. In his later years he lived in southwestern Shreveport near his long-term friend Claude King, known for the 1962 hit songs "Wolverton Mountain" and "The Burning of Atlanta", a ballad about the 1864 battle of Atlanta in the American Civil War.

Franks served in the United States Army during World War II, after which he married the former Virginia Helen Suber. Virginia was reared in two Shreveport orphanages and like her husband graduated from C. E. Byrd High School in Shreveport. She became an artist with speciality in oil paintings, a seamstress, and sang with her husband of sixty years and their son, Tillman Franks, Jr. The Franks had two sons and two daughters.

== Music career ==
After the war, Franks and Claude King formed the Rainbow Boys while working at an assortment of other jobs, mostly in automobile sales. On April 3, 1948, Franks played bass with the Bailes Brothers on the first night of the Louisiana Hayride, broadcast on Shreveport radio station KWKH.

In 1955, as Johnny Horton's manager, he switched the budding singer from Mercury Records to Columbia. He was the sole writer of Horton's first No. 1 single, 1959's "When It's Springtime in Alaska (It's Forty Below)". He and Horton were co-composers of "Honky Tonk Man", Horton's 1956 hit record, that Dwight Yoakam also recorded as his first single. During 1960, Franks co-wrote with Horton the successful singles "Sink the Bismark" and "North to Alaska". Franks was injured in the head and internally as well in the automobile accident on November 5, 1960, in Milano in Milam County in East Texas, which resulted in the death of Johnny Horton and the eventual loss of a leg by a third musician, Tommy Tomlinson.

== Honours and Legacy ==
Franks' contribution to rock and roll music has been recognized by his induction into the Rockabilly Hall of Fame, the Louisiana Hall of Fame, and his induction in 2003 into the Northwest Louisiana Walk of Stars where his feet and hand impressions are in concrete beside other talents, such as Elvis Presley, Terry Bradshaw, Kix Brooks, David Toms, and Franks' longtime friend Claude King. The "Walk of Stars" is located under the Shreveport side of Texas Street Bridge, officially known as the Long–Allen Bridge (Shreveport) that spans the Red River to Bossier City.

Tillman Franks helped to coin the phrase "The Magic Circle," which he describes in his autobiography as: "an area 50-miles in radius from downtown Shreveport from which many kinds of music evolved. I was lucky to have lived my life in The Magic Circle."

On July 11, 1996, Shreveport observed "Tillman Franks Day", sponsored by KWKH.

Franks died in the fall of 2006 at the age of eighty-six. His son, the Reverend Watson Franks, preached the funeral.

In 2019, KEEL Radio recalled Franks as "a legend that should be remembered [for] all the contributions not only to Shreveport's musical history but to rock and country."

Franks' out-of-print autobiography entitled Tillman Franks: I Was There When It Happened is still in demand by his remaining fans.
