= Sink the Bismark =

"Sink the Bismark (Sink the Bismarck)"
- The photo on the "45" Columbia record jacket is from the movie, but depicts the model of HMS Prince of Wales made for the movie. The models made for this movie are closely modeled after their real-life counterparts.

Single by Johnny Horton
- B-side: "The Same Old Tale the Crow Told Me"
- Released: 1960
- Genre: Country, Novelty
- Length: 3:12
- Label: Columbia
- Songwriters: Johnny Horton, Tillman Franks
- Producer: Don Law

Johnny Horton singles chronology
"Sal's Got a Sugar Lip" (1959)	"Sink the Bismark (Sink the Bismarck)" (1960)	"Johnny Freedom" (1960)

"Sink the Bismark" (later "Sink the Bismarck") is a march song by American country music singer Johnny Horton and songwriter Tillman Franks, based on the pursuit and eventual sinking of the German battleship Bismarck in May 1941, during World War II. Horton released this song through Columbia Records in 1960, when it reached number three on the charts. As originally released, the record label used the common misspelling "Bismark"; this error was corrected for later releases of the song. It was inspired by the 1960 British war movie Sink the Bismarck! and was, with the producer John Brabourne's approval, commissioned from Johnny Horton by 20th Century Fox, which was worried about the subject's relative obscurity in the United States. Inexplicably, the size comparisons of guns and shells are switched. While the song was used in U.S. theater trailers for the film, it was not used in the actual film.

== Chart performance ==
Chart (1960)	Peak position
U.S. Billboard Hot C&W Sides	6
U.S. Billboard Hot 100	3
Canadian CHUM Chart	1

== Blues Brothers recording ==
The song was later recorded by the Blues Brothers for a scene in the movie, The Blues Brothers, but was cut out.

== Cover versions ==
- In the UK, the song was a hit for Don Lang, also in 1960, where it peaked at number 43.
- Czech country band Plavci released a version on its 1976 album Country Our Way.

== See also ==
- "PT-109" - another song about a World War II ship
- Parody song "We Didn't Sink the Bismarck" by Homer and Jethro
