= Johnny Horton =

American singer (1925–1960)

Background information
- Also known as: The Singing Fisherman
- Born: John LaGale Horton; April 30, 1925; Los Angeles, California, U.S.
- Died: November 5, 1960 (aged 35) Milano, Texas, U.S.
- Genres: Country; honky-tonk; rockabilly
- Occupations: Singer, musician, songwriter
- Instruments: Guitar, vocals
- Years active: 1950–1960
- Labels: Cormac; Mercury; Abbott; Dot; Columbia

John LaGale Horton (April 30, 1925 – November 5, 1960) was an American country, honky tonk, and rockabilly musician during the 1950s. He is best known for a series of history-inspired narrative country saga songs that became international hits. His 1959 single "The Battle of New Orleans" was awarded the 1960 Grammy Award for Best Country & Western Recording. The song was awarded the Grammy Hall of Fame Award and in 2001 ranked number 333 of the Recording Industry Association of America's "Songs of the Century". His first number-one country song was in 1959, "When It's Springtime in Alaska (It's Forty Below)".

Horton had two successes in 1960 with both "Sink the Bismarck" and "North to Alaska", the latter used during the opening credits of the John Wayne film. Horton died in November 1960 at the peak of his fame in a traffic collision, less than two years after his breakthrough. He is a member of the Rockabilly Hall of Fame, the Louisiana Music Hall of Fame, and in 2025 the Texas Country Music Hall of Fame.

== Early life ==
Horton was born on April 30, 1925, in Los Angeles, the youngest of the five children of the former Ella Claudia Robinson (1892–1966) and John Loly Horton (1889–1959), and raised in Rusk in Cherokee County in East Texas. His family often traveled between East Texas and Southern California to work as sharecroppers. After he graduated from high school in Gallatin, Texas, in 1944, Horton attended Lon Morris Junior College in Jacksonville, Texas, on a basketball scholarship. He later attended Seattle University and briefly Baylor University in Waco, although he did not graduate from any of these institutions.

Horton soon returned to California and got a job in the mail room at Selznick International Pictures, where his future wife, Donna Cook, was working in the studio as a secretary. After a short stint studying geology in Seattle in 1948, Horton went to Alaska to look for gold. During this period, he began writing songs. Returning south, he entered and won a talent contest in Henderson, Texas. Encouraged by this result, he returned to California to pursue a music career.

His guest appearances on Cliffie Stone's Hometown Jamboree on KXLA-AM and KLAC-TV in Pasadena and his own half-hour show The Singing Fisherman led to the opportunity to record some songs on the Cormac record label. By the time the company folded in 1952, Horton had recorded 10 singles for that label. Fabor Robison, owner of Abbott Records, acquired the master recordings. Around that time, Horton married Donna Cook.

== Louisiana Hayride and early career ==
By this time, Horton was appearing regularly on Louisiana Hayride, so Donna and he moved to Shreveport, Louisiana, where the show was recorded. He also signed a contract with Mercury Records and began recording. His first song for that label, "First Train Headin' South" with B-side "(I Wished for an Angel) The Devil Sent Me You" (Mercury 6412), received good reviews. His new backup band, the Rowley Trio, and he began touring under the name the Singing Fisherman and the Rowley Trio in 1952, eventually changing the name to Johnny Horton and the Roadrunners. The group included Horton as lead singer and Jerry Rowley on fiddle, as well Rowley's wife Evelyn on piano and his sister Vera (Dido) on guitars. The constant touring was hard on Horton's marriage, and Donna moved back to Los Angeles. They were soon divorced.

On September 26, 1953, Horton married Billie Jean Jones, widow of Hank Williams, who had died on January 1, 1953. Horton parted ways with the Rowley trio, but continued to appear occasionally on Louisiana Hayride. His contract with Mercury expired in late 1954, with his recording of "All for the Love of a Girl" (Mercury 70227) being his bestseller, at 35,000 to 45,000 copies. Horton, himself always an avid fisherman, got a job in a tackle shop and put his music career on hiatus, but by the following year, his new manager and bassist Tillman Franks had obtained Horton a one-year contract with Columbia Records. They traveled to Nashville in a borrowed car for their first recording session. Influenced by the work of Elvis Presley, Horton began adopting a more rockabilly style.

== "Honky-Tonk Man" and later career ==
"Honky-Tonk Man" was recorded on January 11, 1956, at the Bradley Film and Recording Studios in Nashville, one of four songs Horton recorded that day. Session musicians on the recording were Grady Martin and Harold Bradley, as well as Bill Black (at the time Presley's bassist). Soon afterwards, "Honky-Tonk Man" was released as a single (Columbia label: 4–21504) paired with another song from the same session, "I'm Ready if You're Willing". They went out on tour, with the band featuring Franks on bass and Tommy Tomlinson on guitar.

"Honky-Tonk Man" was reviewed by the March 10 issue of Billboard, which said, "The wine, women, and song attractions exert a powerful hold on the singer, he admits. The funky sound and pounding beat in the backing suggest the kind of atmosphere he describes. A very good jukebox record." Their review of "I'm Ready if You're Willing" was also positive: "Horton sings out this cheerful material with amiable personality. This ever more popular stylist ought to expand his circle of fans with this one." The song peaked at number 9 on the C&W Jockey chart (now Hot Country Songs) and at number 14 on the Best Seller chart.

Horton returned to the studio on May 23, but the "A" side of his next single, "I'm a One-Woman Man" (Columbia 21538), was one of the songs recorded back in January. The "B" side was "I Don't Like I Did". Billboard described "One-Woman Man" as a "smart and polished job," and Horton as "singing with a light, airy touch. Guitar work is just as convincing, adding up to listenable, commercial stuff". His band and he toured through the United States and Canada to promote the record, which reached number seven on the Jockey chart and number 9 on the Best Seller and Jukebox charts.

"I'm Coming Home" / "I Got A Hole in My Pirogue" (Columbia 40813) was released around this time, as well. On February 9, Billboard noted, "not only Southern markets are doing good business with this, but Northern cities report that both country and pop customers are going for this in a big way". It was again a success on the country charts (number 11 Jockey, number 15 Best Seller), but it failed to score the popular music charts.

Later major successes include the song "The Battle of New Orleans" (written by Jimmy Driftwood), which was awarded the 1960 Grammy Award for Best Country & Western Recording. The song was awarded the Grammy Hall of Fame Award and in 2001 ranked number 333 of the Recording Industry Association of America's "Songs of the Century". Horton had two other successes in 1960 with "Sink the Bismarck" and "North to Alaska" for John Wayne's movie, North to Alaska.

== Personal life ==
Horton was married twice. His first marriage, to Donna Cook, ended with a divorce granted in Rusk, Texas.

In September 1953, he married Billie Jean Jones, the widow of country-music singer Hank Williams. Billie Jean and Horton had two daughters, Yanina (Nina) and Melody, and Horton adopted Billie Jean's daughter Jeri Lynn.

== Death ==
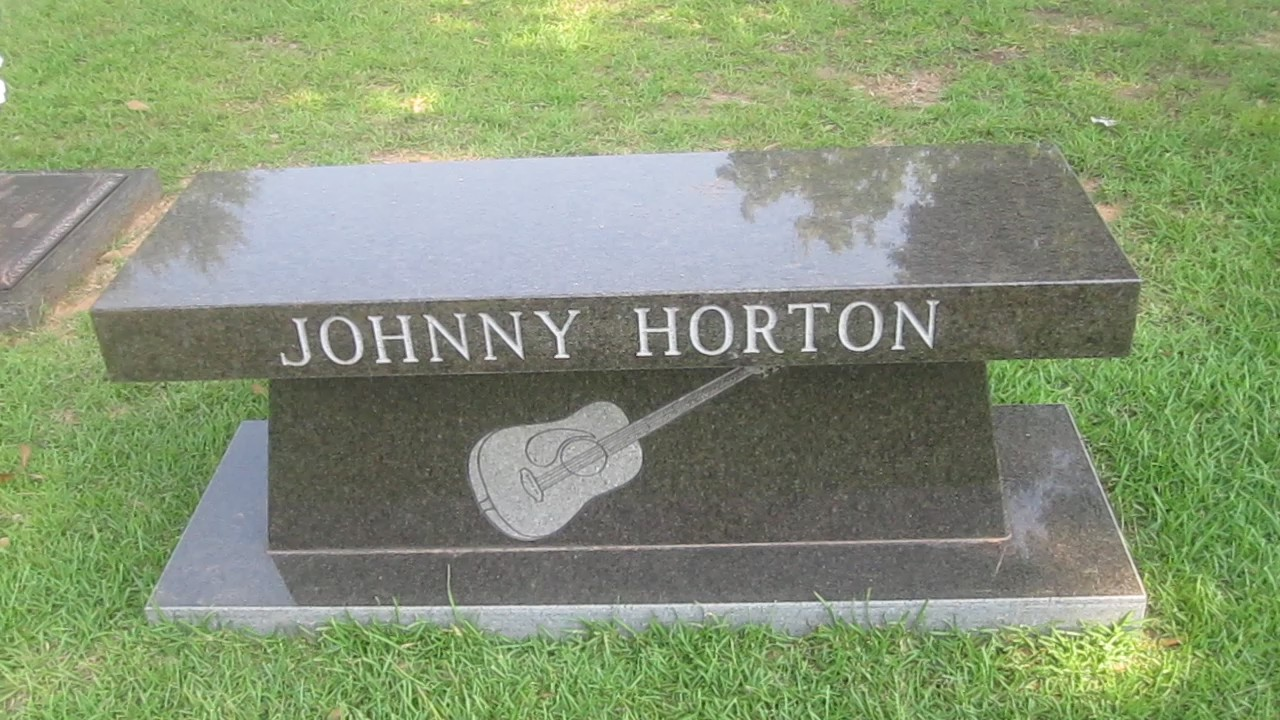
Johnny Horton bench at Hillcrest Cemetery in Haughton, Louisiana

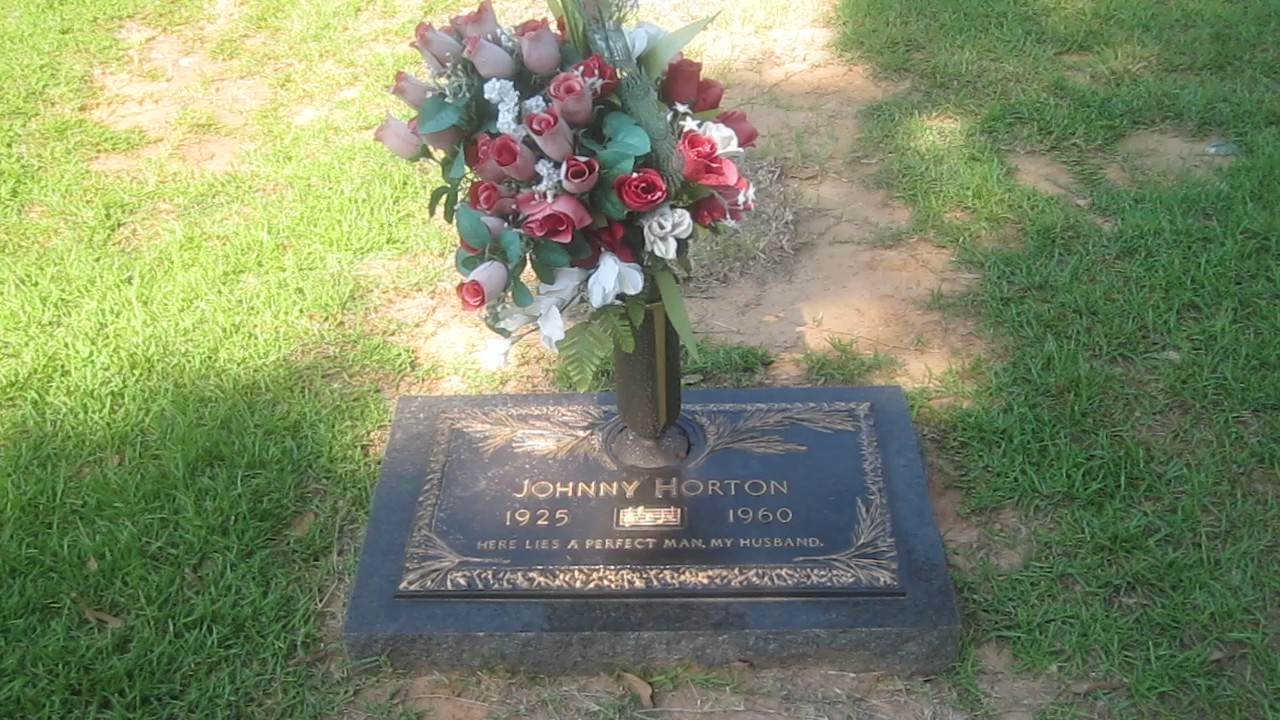
Horton's grave marker

On the night of November 4–5, 1960, Horton and two other band members, Tommy Tomlinson and Tillman Franks, were traveling from the Skyline Club in Austin, Texas, to Shreveport, when they collided with an oncoming truck on a bridge near Milano in Milam County, Texas. Horton died en route to the hospital, and Tomlinson (1930–1982) was seriously injured; his leg was later amputated. Franks (1920–2006) suffered head injuries, and James Davis, the driver of the truck, sustained a broken ankle and other minor injuries.

The funeral was held in Shreveport on November 8, 1960, officiated by Franks' younger brother William Derrel "Billy" Franks, a Church of God minister. Johnny Cash performed one of the readings, choosing Chapter 20 from the Gospel of John (Resurrection of Jesus).

Horton is interred at Hillcrest Memorial Park and Mausoleum in Haughton, east of Bossier City in northwestern Louisiana.

== Legacy ==
When Johnny Cash, a good friend of Horton's, learned about the accident, he said, "[I] locked myself in one of the hotel's barrooms and cried." Cash dedicated his rendition of "When It's Springtime in Alaska (It's Forty Below)" to Horton on his album Personal File: "Johnny Horton was a good old friend of mine." Over time, Horton's material has been rereleased a number of times, through box sets and compilations.

Horton was inducted into the Louisiana Music Hall of Fame and posthumously inducted into the Delta Music Museum Hall of Fame in Ferriday, Louisiana.

Horton was inducted in to the Texas Country Music Hall of Fame in 2025.

== Discography ==
=== Albums ===
Year	Album	Chart Positions		RIAA	Label
Year	Album	US Country	US	RIAA	Label
1959	Johnny Horton				Dot
1959	The Fantastic Johnny Horton				Mercury
1959	The Spectacular Johnny Horton				Columbia
1960	Johnny Horton Makes History				Columbia
1961	Johnny Horton's Greatest Hits		8	Platinum	Columbia
1962	Honky-Tonk Man		104		Columbia
1965	I Can't Forget You				Columbia
1966	Johnny Horton Sings				Columbia
1967	Johnny Horton On Stage	37			Columbia
1968	The Unforgettable Johnny Horton				Columbia
1970	On the Road				Columbia
1970	The Legendary Johnny Horton				Columbia
1971	The Battle of New Orleans				Columbia
1971	The World of Johnny Horton				

Post Mortem Albums
Release	Name	Riaa	Label
1968	The Unforgettable Johnny Horton		Columbia
2023	Done Rovin'		Sun
2025	Free n' Easy		Bear Family Records

=== Singles ===
Year	Single (A-side, B-side) Both sides from same album except where indicated	Chart Positions		Album
Year	Single (A-side, B-side) Both sides from same album except where indicated	US Country	US	Album
1952	"The Rest Of Your Life" b/w "This Won't Be The First Time"			Non-album tracks
1952	"I Won't Forget" b/w "The Child's Side Of Life" (from The Fantastic Johnny Horton)			Non-album tracks
1953	"Plaid and Calico" b/w "Shadows On The Old Bayou"			Non-album tracks
1953	"Tennessee Jive" b/w "The Mansion You Stole" (from The Fantastic Johnny Horton)			Non-album tracks
1953	"I Won't Get Dreamy Eyed" b/w "S.S. Lure-Line" (from The Fantastic Johnny Horton)			Non-album tracks
1954	"There'll Never Be Another Mary" b/w "No True Love" b/w "The Train with the Rhumba Beat"			Non-album tracks
1955	"Journey With No End" b/w "Ridin' The Sunshine Special" (from The Fantastic Johnny Horton)			Non-album tracks
1955	"Hey Sweet, Sweet Thing" b/w "Big Wheels Rollin'" (from The Fantastic Johnny Horton)			Non-album tracks
1956	"Honky-Tonk Man" b/w "I'm Ready, If You're Willing" (Original version, non-album track)	9		Honky-Tonk Man
1956	"I'm A One-Woman Man" b/w "I Don't Like I Did" (Non-album track)	7		Honky-Tonk Man
1957	"I'm Coming Home" b/w "I Got A Hole In My Pirogue"	11		Honky-Tonk Man
1957	"The Woman I Need" b/w "She Knows Why" (from Honky-Tonk Man)	9		Non-album track
1957	"I'll Do It Every Time" b/w "Let's Take The Long Way Home" (Non-album track)			The Legendary Johnny Horton
1957	"Lover's Rock" b/w "You're My Baby"			Non-album tracks
1958	"Honky Tonk Hardwood Floor" b/w "The Wild One"			Honky-Tonk Man
1958	"All Grown Up" b/w "Counterfeit Love"	8		The Legendary Johnny Horton
1959	"When It's Springtime in Alaska (It's Forty Below)" b/w "Whispering Pines"	1		The Spectacular Johnny Horton
1959	"The Battle of New Orleans" b/w "All For The Love Of A Girl" (re-recording)	1	1	The Spectacular Johnny Horton
1959	"Johnny Reb" /	10	54	Johnny Horton Makes History
1959	"Sal's Got A Sugar Lip"	19	81	Non-album track
1959	"I'm Ready, If You're Willing" (re-recording) b/w "Take Me Like I Am" (from The Legendary Johnny Horton)			Johnny Horton's Greatest Hits
1959	"They Shined Up Rudolph's Nose" b/w "The Electrified Donkey"			Non-album tracks
1960	"Sink the Bismarck" b/w "The Same Old Tale The Crow Told Me" (differs from other versions and did not appear on any Columbia album)	6	3	Johnny Horton Makes History
1960	"Johnny Freedom" b/w "Comanche (The Brave Horse)"		69	Johnny Horton Makes History
1960	"North To Alaska" b/w "The Mansion You Stole" (re-recording)	1	4	Johnny Horton's Greatest Hits
1961	"Sleepy-Eyed John" b/w "They'll Never Take Her Love from Me"	9	54	Honky-Tonk Man
1961	"Ole Slew-Foot" b/w "Miss Marcy" (from The Legendary Johnny Horton)	28	110	Honky-Tonk Man
1962	"Honky-Tonk Man"(re-release) b/w "Words" (from The Legendary Johnny Horton)	11	96	Honky-Tonk Man
1963	"All Grown Up" b/w "I'm A One-Woman Man" (from Honky-Tonk Man); Re-releases	26		The Legendary Johnny Horton
1963	"When It's Springtime In Alaska (It's Forty Below)" (re-release) b/w "Sugar-Coated Baby" (from The Unforgettable Johnny Horton)			The Spectacular Johnny Horton
1964	"Hooray For That Little Difference" b/w "Tell My Baby I Love Her" (Non-album track)			The Unforgettable Johnny Horton
1964	"Lost Highway" b/w "The Same Old Tale The Crow Told Me"			I Can't Forget You
1965	"I Just Don't Like This Kind Of Livin'" b/w "Rock Island Line" (from The World Of Johnny Horton)			On The Road
1966	"Sam Magee" b/w "All For The Love Of A Girl"			The Spectacular Johnny Horton
1967	"The Battle Of New Orleans" b/w "All For The Love Of A Girl"; Re-release			The Spectacular Johnny Horton
