= When It's Springtime in Alaska (It's Forty Below) =

Song by Johnny Horton
- B-side: "Whispering Pines"
- Released: 1959
- Genre: Ballad, Country
- Label: Columbia Records
- Songwriter(s): Tillman Franks

"When It's Springtime in Alaska (It's Forty Below)" is a 1959 single by Johnny Horton, written by Tillman Franks and released through Columbia Records. The single was Johnny Horton's sixth release on the country chart and the first of three number ones on the country chart. The single spent twenty-three weeks on the chart. The song was a marginally successful crossover, reaching #85 on the Music Vendor Pop Top 100.

The song takes place in Fairbanks, Alaska in the springtime. The narrator/singer is a prospector making a trip to Fairbanks after two years in the wilderness; he decides to visit a saloon and hears "redheaded Lil" singing the title words. He and Lil spend the evening dancing, but the singer is unaware that Lil is "Big Ed's wife-to-be." Big Ed discovers the two dancing and throws his knife at the singer, who predicts that he will not survive his wound: "When it's springtime in Alaska, I'll be six feet below."

The lyrics say the temperature outside is −40 °F (−40 °C). While it is very rare for the temperature to actually be that low in the springtime in Fairbanks, it has happened. A low temperature of −40 °F (−40 °C) was recorded at the Fairbanks International Airport on March 30, 1970. The coldest time of the year in Fairbanks is around January 13 of each year, with night-time low temperatures at this time averaging around −23 °F (−31 °C) and daytime high temperatures averaging around −4 °F (−20 °C). The coldest-ever low temperature recorded there was −62 °F (−52 °C), on December 28 and 29, 1961. A temperature of −66 °F (−54 °C) was recorded in Fairbanks on January 14, 1934.
