= Dwight Yoakam singles discography =

Singles discography

Dwight Yoakam discography
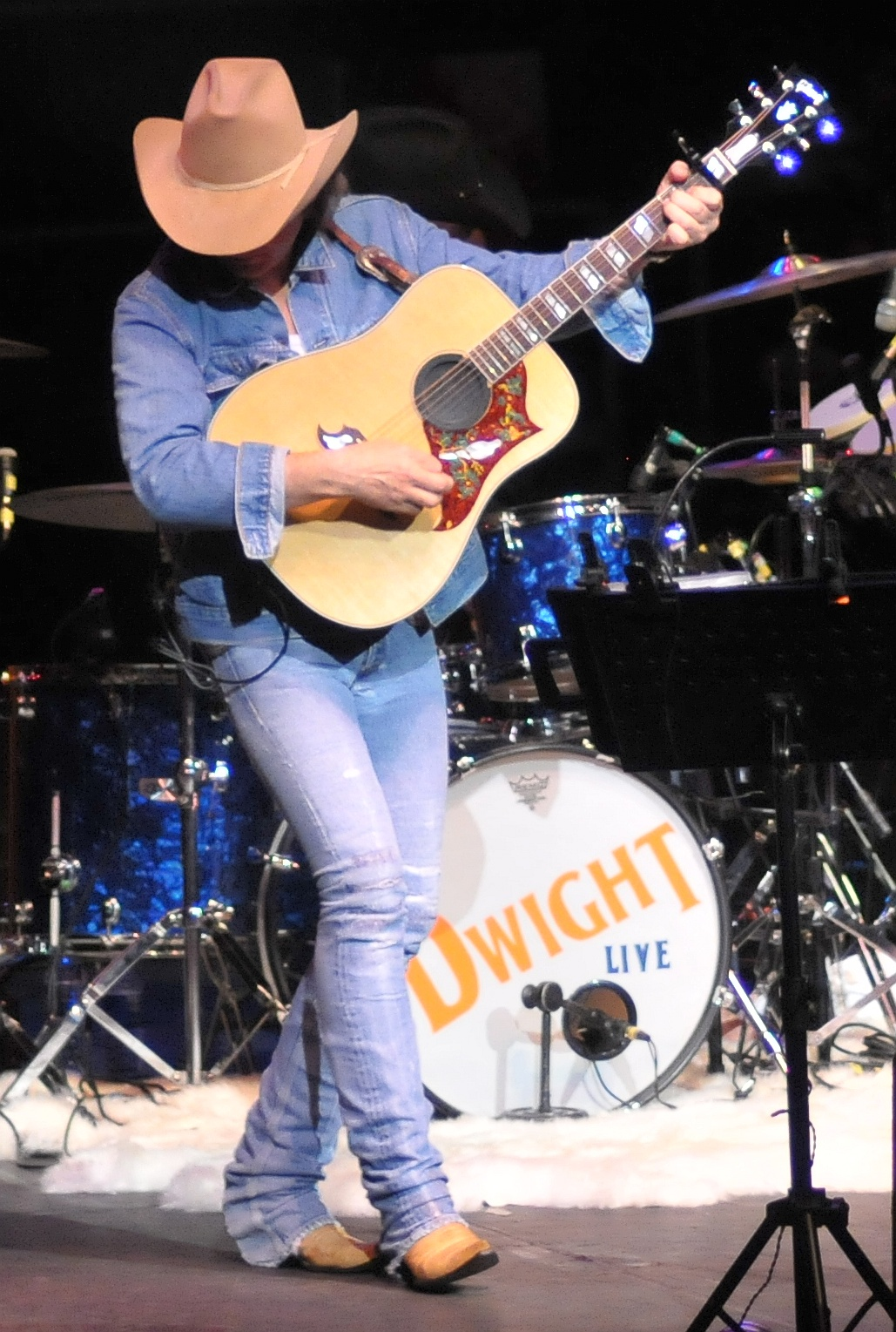
- Dwight Yoakam at San Diego County Fair
- Singles: 46
- Music videos: 36
- Other charted songs: 1
- #1 singles: 8

Dwight Yoakam is an American country music singer-songwriter. Since his debut single, "Honky Tonk Man" in 1986, he has released 46 singles, including two Billboard Hot Country Songs number one singles, as well as 6 number ones in Canada. In addition to having two number one singles in the United States, Yoakam also has thirteen Top 10 singles on the country chart.

His 1993 album This Time is his best-selling album, being certified triple-platinum by the Recording Industry Association of America, without having charted a number one single. The album had three consecutive number two hits, with two additional Top 30 singles. During the late-1990s and 2000s, Yoakam's radio audience had virtually disappeared. Since 2000, he has charted only one Top 40 single, "What Do You Know About Love", that reached number 26. Subsequent singles failed to reach the Top 40, or even chart at all. His last chart appearance occurred in 2005, with "Blame the Vain", which reached number 58 on the country chart.

== Singles ==
=== 1980s ===
Year	Single	Peak chart positions			Album
Year	Single	US Country	CAN Country	NZ	Album
1986	"Honky Tonk Man"	3	1	—	Guitars, Cadillacs, Etc., Etc.
1986	"Guitars, Cadillacs"	4	2	—	Guitars, Cadillacs, Etc., Etc.
1986	"It Won't Hurt"	31	7	—	Guitars, Cadillacs, Etc., Etc.
1987	"Little Sister"	7	3	35	Hillbilly Deluxe
1987	"Little Ways"	8	1	—	Hillbilly Deluxe
1987	"Please, Please Baby"	6	2	—	Hillbilly Deluxe
1988	"Always Late with Your Kisses"	9	5	—	Hillbilly Deluxe
1988	"Streets of Bakersfield" (with Buck Owens)	1	1	—	Buenas Noches from a Lonely Room
1988	"I Sang Dixie"	1	1	—	Buenas Noches from a Lonely Room
1989	"I Got You"	5	5	—	Buenas Noches from a Lonely Room
1989	"Buenas Noches from a Lonely Room (She Wore Red Dresses)"	46	52	—	Buenas Noches from a Lonely Room
1989	"Long White Cadillac"	35	44	—	Just Lookin' for a Hit
"—" denotes releases that did not chart or were not released in that country

=== 1990s ===
Year	Single	Peak chart positions					Album
Year	Single	US Country	US	CAN Country	CAN AC	UK	Album
1990	"Turn It On, Turn It Up, Turn Me Loose"	11	—	5	—	—	If There Was a Way
1991	"You're the One"	5	—	4	—	—	If There Was a Way
1991	"Nothing's Changed Here"	15	—	2	—	—	If There Was a Way
1991	"It Only Hurts When I Cry"	7	—	4	—	—	If There Was a Way
1992	"The Heart That You Own"	18	—	13	—	—	If There Was a Way
1992	"Send a Message to My Heart" (with Patty Loveless)	47	—	30	—	—	If There Was a Way
1992	"Suspicious Minds"	35	—	51	—	—	Honeymoon in Vegas: Music from the Original Motion Picture Soundtrack
1993	"Ain't That Lonely Yet"	2	— (Note: "Ain't That Lonely Yet" did not enter the Hot 100, but peaked at number one on the Bubbling Under Hot 100 Singles chart, which acts as a 25-song extension of the Hot 100.)	1	—	—	This Time
1993	"A Thousand Miles from Nowhere"	2	—	3	—	—	This Time
1993	"Fast as You"	2	70	5	—	—	This Time
1994	"Try Not to Look So Pretty"	14	—	4	—	—	This Time
1994	"Pocket of a Clown"	22	—	4	—	—	This Time
1995	"Nothing"	20	—	20	—	—	Gone
1996	"Gone (That'll Be Me)"	51	—	43	—	—	Gone
1996	"Sorry You Asked?"	59	—	73	—	—	Gone
1996	"Heart of Stone"	—	—	90	—	—	Gone
1997	"Claudette"	47	—	44	—	—	Under the Covers
1997	"Baby Don't Go" (with Sheryl Crow)	—	—	—	—	—	Under the Covers
1998	"Things Change"	17	—	23	—	—	A Long Way Home
1998	"These Arms"	57	—	79	—	—	A Long Way Home
1999	"Crazy Little Thing Called Love"	12	64	1	19	35	Last Chance for a Thousand Years: Greatest Hits from the 90's
1999	"Thinking About Leaving"	54	—	59	—	—	Last Chance for a Thousand Years: Greatest Hits from the 90's
"—" denotes releases that did not chart or were not released in that country

=== 2000s — 2020s ===
Year	Single	Peak positions	Album
Year	Single	US Country	Album
2000	"What Do You Know About Love"	26	Tomorrow's Sounds Today
2001	"I Want You to Want Me"	49	Tomorrow's Sounds Today
2001	"I Was There" (with Buck Owens)	—	Tomorrow's Sounds Today
2002	"Sitting Pretty"	—	Inside Traxx 2002
2003	"The Back of Your Hand"	52	Population Me
2003	"The Late Great Golden State"	52	Population Me
2005	"Intentional Heartache"	54	Blame the Vain
2005	"Blame the Vain"	58	Blame the Vain
2006	"I Wanna Love Again"	—	Blame the Vain
2007	"Close Up the Honky Tonks"	—	Dwight Sings Buck
2014	"Who'll Stop the Rain"	—	—N/a
2016	"Tomorrow's Gonna Be Another Day"	—	—N/a
2024	"I'll Pay the Price"	—	Brighter Days
"—" denotes releases that did not chart

== Other singles ==
=== Christmas singles ===
Year	Single	Peak positions	Album
Year	Single	US Country	Album
1997	"Santa Claus Is Back In Town"	60	Come On Christmas

=== Guest singles ===
Year	Single	Artist	Peak positions	Album
Year	Single	Artist	US Country	Album
1992	"Sweet Suzanne"	Buzzin' Cousins	68	Falling from Grace: The Original Motion Picture Soundtrack
1998	"Same Old Train"	Various artists	59	Tribute to Tradition
2018	"It Only Hurts Me When I Cry (Live)"	Various artists	—	King of the Road: A Tribute to Roger Miller

== Videography ==
=== Music videos ===
Year	Title	Director
1986	"Honky Tonk Man"	Sherman Halsey
1986	"Guitars, Cadillacs"	Sherman Halsey
1987	"Little Sister"	Sherman Halsey
1988	"Always Late with Your Kisses"	Sherman Halsey
1988	"Streets of Bakersfield" (with Buck Owens)	Marcus Stevens
1989	"Long White Cadillac"	Neil Abramson
1990	"Turn It On, Turn It Up, Turn Me Loose"	Steve Vaughan
1990	"Hey Good Lookin'" (with Buckwheat Zydeco and David Hidalgo)	
1991	"You're the One"	Jim Gable
1991	"It Only Hurts When I Cry"	Piers Plowden
1992	"The Heart That You Own"	Neil Abramson
1992	"Takes a Lot to Rock You"	Jim Gable
1992	"Sweet Suzanne" (Buzzin' Cousins)	Marty Callner
1992	"Suspicious Minds"	Gregory R. Alosio
1993	"Ain't That Lonely Yet"	Carolyn Mayer/Dwight Yoakam
1993	"A Thousand Miles from Nowhere"	Carolyn Mayer/Dwight Yoakam
1993	"Fast as You"	Carolyn Mayer
1994	"Try Not to Look So Pretty"	Gregory R. Alosio/Dwight Yoakam
1994	"Pocket of a Clown"	Gregory R. Alosio
1995	"Please, Please Baby" (live)	Bud Schaetzle
1995	"Nothing"	Dwight Yoakam
1996	"Gone (That'll Be Me)"	Dwight Yoakam
1996	"Sorry You Asked?"	Dwight Yoakam
1996	"Heart of Stone"	Dwight Yoakam
1998	"Things Change"	Dwight Yoakam
1998	"These Arms"	Dwight Yoakam
1998	"Same Old Train" (Various)	Steve Boyle
1999	"Crazy Little Thing Called Love"	Dwight Yoakam
1999	"Thinking About Leaving"	Dwight Yoakam
2000	"What Do You Know About Love"	Dwight Yoakam
2000	"I Want You to Want Me"	Dwight Yoakam
2003	"The Back of Your Hand"	Margaret Malandruccolo
2004	"The Late Great Golden State"	Steven Goldmann
2005	"Intentional Heartache"	Dwight Yoakam
2005	"Blame the Vain"	Dwight Yoakam
2007	"Close Up the Honky Tonks"	Fred Durst
2012	"A Heart Like Mine"	Margaret Malandruccolo
2015	"Liar"	Gregory R. Alosio

=== Guest appearances ===
Title	Year	Artist(s)	Director(s)	Ref.
"Out of Goodbyes"	2011	Maroon 5 featuring Lady Antebellum	Travis Schneider	
