= The Very Best of Dwight Yoakam =

Greatest hits album by Dwight Yoakam
- Released: July 27, 2004
- Recorded: various
- Genre: Country
- Length: 69:43
- Label: Rhino/Reprise
- Producer: Various

Dwight Yoakam chronology
Dwight's Used Records (2004)	The Very Best of Dwight Yoakam (2004)	Blame the Vain (2005)

Professional ratings
Review scores
Source	Rating
AllMusic	4/5 stars

The Very Best of Dwight Yoakam is the third greatest hits compilation album of songs recorded by country music artist Dwight Yoakam. The album comprises twenty hit singles from his career.

== Commercial performance ==
The album was reached No. 10 on Billboard's country album chart. It was certified Gold by the RIAA on July 23, 2008, and Platinum on October 28, 2016. It has sold 1,124,300 copies in the United States as of October 2019.

== Track listing ==
1. "Honky Tonk Man" (Johnny Horton, Tillman Franks, Howard Hausey) – 2:48
2. "Guitars, Cadillacs" (Dwight Yoakam) – 3:04
3. "Little Sister" (Doc Pomus, Mort Shuman) – 3:04
4. "Little Ways" (Yoakam) – 3:20
5. "Please, Please Baby" (Yoakam) – 3:35
6. "Streets of Bakersfield" (Feat. Buck Owens) (Homer Joy) – 2:49
7. "I Sang Dixie" (Yoakam) – 3:49
8. "Long White Cadillac" (Dave Alvin) – 5:20
9. "Turn It On, Turn It Up, Turn Me Loose" (Kostas, Wayland Patton) – 3:24
10. "You're the One" (Yoakam) – 4:02
11. "Suspicious Minds" (Mark James) – 3:54
12. "It Only Hurts When I Cry" (Yoakam, Roger Miller) – 2:35
13. "Ain't That Lonely Yet" (Kostas, James House) – 3:20
14. "A Thousand Miles from Nowhere" (Yoakam) – 4:29
15. "Fast as You" (Yoakam) – 4:48
16. "Crazy Little Thing Called Love" (Freddie Mercury) – 2:21
17. "I Want You to Want Me" (Rick Nielsen) – 3:29
18. "Things Change" (Yoakam) – 3:46
19. "The Late Great Golden State" (Mike Stinson) – 2:26
20. "The Back of Your Hand" (Gregg Lee Henry) – 3:08

== Chart performance ==
=== Weekly charts ===
Chart (2004)	Peak position
Norwegian Albums (VG-lista)	14
US Billboard 200	87
US Top Country Albums (Billboard)	10

=== Year-end charts ===
Chart (2005)	Position
US Top Country Albums (Billboard)	54
