= Just Lookin' for a Hit =

Greatest hits album by Dwight Yoakam
- Released: September 20, 1989
- Genre: Country
- Length: 35:17
- Label: Reprise
- Producer: Pete Anderson

Dwight Yoakam chronology
Buenas Noches from a Lonely Room (1988)	Just Lookin' for a Hit (1989)	If There Was a Way (1990)

Professional ratings
Review scores
Source	Rating
Allmusic	5/5 stars

Just Lookin' for a Hit is the first compilation album by American country music artist Dwight Yoakam. It includes eight singles from his 1980s albums for Reprise Records, as well as two newly recorded cover songs: "Long White Cadillac", originally recorded by The Blasters, and "Sin City", originally recorded by the Flying Burrito Brothers.

== Recording ==
The collection is best known for containing the Dave Alvin composition "Long White Cadillac", a song about the death of Hank Williams, who died in the backseat of a Cadillac on his way to a show in Canton, Ohio, on New Year's Day, 1953. Yoakam played gigs alongside Alvin's band the Blasters, Los Lobos, X, and others in the rock and punk clubs of Los Angeles, and beginning in 1986, Yoakam scored a run of three consecutive number one country albums. According to Don McLeese's biography of Yoakam A Thousand Miles from Nowhere, Alvin was overjoyed when Yoakam, one of the hottest stars in country music at the time, told him that he was going to record the song:

And I went, "Fuck yes!" So I went down there, and they'd already cut the track and Dwight was putting on harmony vocals. As I'm driving over, I'm kind of imagining how it's gonna work as a country shuffle. And then I get there and hear a six-minute long psychedelic thing! And all I could do was think like a radio-programmer – can we add more fiddle? [He laughs heartily.] Maybe shorten it a little? I'm trying to get a yacht here. Maybe just a rowboat. And Dwight said to me, "This is my fuck you to country radio." And my innermost thought was, "Could you pick someone else's song to do that with?

Yoakam later insisted, "I did it because I loved that song. I thought it was one of the greatest songs ever written. A rock and roll homage to Hank Williams, who was essentially the first rock star." The album also contains a cover version of the Flying Burrito Brothers song "Sin City", which was written by Chris Hillman and Gram Parsons. Parsons, who also died young, was a country-rock pioneer and guiding light behind the Byrds' seminal Sweetheart of the Rodeo album that Yoakam highly regarded. He sang the tune as a duet with Canadian singer k.d. lang, who, like Yoakam, was a maverick on the country music scene at the time.

== Reception ==
AllMusic: "When one considers that these are merely highlights - and some of them arguable choices -from his first three records, the true value of Yoakam as a recording artist who single-handedly revitalized traditional country music becomes evident. This is a smoking hits collection but is only a taste of the treasures that lie within the individual albums themselves."

== Track listing ==
No.	Title	Writer(s)	Length
1.	"Long White Cadillac"	Dave Alvin	5:21
2.	"Little Ways"	Dwight Yoakam	3:21
3.	"Honky Tonk Man"	Johnny Horton, Tillman Franks, Howard Hausey	2:47
4.	"I Got You"	Yoakam	3:31
5.	"Little Sister"	Doc Pomus, Mort Shuman	3:04
6.	"I Sang Dixie"	Yoakam	3:50
7.	"Guitars, Cadillacs"	Yoakam	3:04
8.	"Sin City" (duet with k.d. lang)	Gram Parsons, Chris Hillman	3:55
9.	"Please, Please Baby"	Yoakam	3:35
10.	"Streets of Bakersfield" (duet with Buck Owens)	Homer Joy	2:49
Total length:			35:17

== Personnel ==
- Pete Anderson – acoustic guitar, six-string bass guitar, electric guitar, percussion
- Tom Brumley – pedal steel guitar
- Jeff Donavan – drums
- Skip Edwards – piano
- J.D. Foster – bass guitar
- Glen D. Hardin – piano
- Flaco Jiménez – accordion
- Scott Joss – mandolin, background vocals
- Brantley Kearns – fiddle, background vocals
- k.d. lang – duet vocals on "Sin City"
- Jim Lauderdale – background vocals
- Buck Owens – duet vocals on "Streets of Bakersfield"
- Taras Prodaniuk – bass guitar
- Don Reed – fiddle
- Dusty Wakeman – six-string bass guitar
- Dwight Yoakam – acoustic guitar, percussion, lead vocals, background vocals

== Chart positions ==
=== Weekly charts ===
Chart (1989)	Peak position
Australian Albums (ARIA)	141
Canadian Albums (RPM)	64
US Billboard 200	68
US Top Country Albums (Billboard)	3

=== Year-end charts ===
Chart (1990)	Position
US Top Country Albums (Billboard)	24

=== Singles ===
Year	Single	Chart positions	
Year	Single	US Country	CAN Country
1989	"Long White Cadillac"	35	44

== Certifications ==
Region	Certification	Certified units/sales
United States (RIAA)	Platinum	1,000,000^{^}
^{^} Shipments figures based on certification alone.
