= Dwight Live =

Live album by Dwight Yoakam
- Released: May 23, 1995
- Recorded: July 30, 1994
- Venue: The Warfield Theatre, San Francisco, CA
- Genre: Country
- Length: 71:46
- Label: Reprise
- Producer: Pete Anderson

Dwight Yoakam chronology
This Time (1993)	Dwight Live (1995)	Gone (1995)

Professional ratings
Review scores
Source	Rating
Allmusic	2/5 stars

Dwight Live is the first live album by country music artist Dwight Yoakam. It was released in 1995 on Reprise Records. Recorded at The Warfield in San Francisco, California in 1994 on his This Time Tour, this album comprises live renditions of seventeen of his songs.

== Track listing ==
1. "Little Sister" (Doc Pomus, Mort Shuman) – 3:52
2. "It Only Hurts When I Cry" (Roger Miller, Dwight Yoakam) – 2:30
3. "The Heart That You Own" (Yoakam) – 4:04
4. "This Time" (Yoakam, Kostas) – 3:51
5. "Streets of Bakersfield" (Homer Joy) – 2:47
6. "Little Ways" (Yoakam) – 3:25
7. "Please, Please Baby" (Yoakam) – 4:05
8. "Nothing's Changed Here" (Yoakam, Kostas) – 3:09
9. "Lonesome Roads" (Yoakam) – 3:22
10. "A Thousand Miles from Nowhere" (Yoakam) – 4:20
11. "Wild Ride" (Yoakam) – 4:43
12. "Two Doors Down" (Yoakam, Kostas) – 3:58
13. "Fast as You" (Yoakam) – 4:19
14. "Long White Cadillac" (Dave Alvin) – 6:47
15. "Miner's Prayer" (Yoakam) – 2:25
16. "Rocky Road Blues" (Bill Monroe) – 6:44
17. "Suspicious Minds" (Mark James) – 7:25

== Personnel ==
- Beth Anderson – background vocals
- Pete Anderson – electric guitar
- Jim Christie – drums
- Skip Edwards – keyboards
- Tommy Funderburk – background vocals
- Scott Joss – fiddle, mandolin
- Taras Prodaniuk – bass guitar
- Dwight Yoakam – acoustic guitar, electric guitar, lead vocals

== Charts ==
=== Weekly charts ===
Chart (1995)	Peak position
Canadian Country Albums (RPM)	4
US Billboard 200	56
US Top Country Albums (Billboard)	8

=== Year-end charts ===
Chart (1995)	Position
US Top Country Albums (Billboard)	68
