= Last Chance for a Thousand Years: Dwight Yoakam's Greatest Hits from the 90's =

Greatest hits album by Dwight Yoakam
- Released: May 18, 1999
- Recorded: 1990–1999
- Genre: Country
- Length: 49:04
- Label: Reprise
- Producer: Pete Anderson

Dwight Yoakam chronology
A Long Way Home (1998)	Last Chance for a Thousand Years: Dwight Yoakam's Greatest Hits from the 90's (1999)	dwightyoakamacoustic.net (2000)

Singles from Last Chance for a Thousand Years: Dwight Yoakam's Greatest Hits from the 90s
- 1. "Crazy Little Thing Called Love" Released: April 1999; 2. "Thinking About Leaving" Released: July 1999

Professional ratings
Review scores
Source	Rating
AllMusic	5/5 stars

Last Chance for a Thousand Years: Dwight Yoakam's Greatest Hits from the 90's is the second compilation album by American country music singer Dwight Yoakam. It includes 11 of his hit singles from the 1990s, as well as three new recordings. These new songs are a cover of Queen's "Crazy Little Thing Called Love", as well as an adapted rendition of Rodney Crowell's "Thinking About Leaving" and "I'll Go Back to Her", originally by Waylon Jennings. “Crazy Little Thing Called Love,” which hit #12 on the country singles chart and rose to #64 on Billboard’s Hot 100, was Yoakam's biggest hit single since 1993's "Fast as You." Last Chance for a Thousand Years has been certified gold by the RIAA.

== Track listing ==
No.	Title	Writer(s)	Length
1.	"Turn It On, Turn It Up, Turn Me Loose"	Kostas; Wayland Patton	3:22
2.	"You're the One"	Dwight Yoakam	3:58
3.	"It Only Hurts When I Cry"	Yoakam; Roger Miller	2:33
4.	"The Heart That You Own"	Yoakam	3:09
5.	"Suspicious Minds"	Mark James	3:49
6.	"Thinking About Leaving"	Yoakam; Rodney Crowell	3:54
7.	"A Thousand Miles from Nowhere"	Yoakam	4:25
8.	"Ain't That Lonely Yet"	Kostas; James House	3:15
9.	"Fast as You"	Yoakam	4:46
10.	"Pocket of a Clown"	Yoakam	2:55
11.	"Sorry You Asked?"	Yoakam	3:20
12.	"Nothing"	Yoakam; Kostas	3:52
13.	"I'll Go Back to Her"	Waylon Jennings	3:28
14.	"Crazy Little Thing Called Love"	Freddie Mercury	2:18
Total length:			49:04

== Personnel ==
- Beth Anderson – background vocals
- Maxi Anderson – background vocals
- Pete Anderson – electric guitar, acoustic guitar, hand claps
- Tom Brumley – steel guitar, lap steel guitar
- Lenny Castro – percussion
- Jim Christie – drums
- Jonathan Clark – background vocals
- Chuck Domanico – upright bass
- Jeff Donavan – drums
- Skip Edwards – accordion, keyboards, organ, piano
- Tommy Funderburk – background vocals
- Jim Haas – background vocals
- Scott Humphrey – drum programming
- Carl Jackson – background vocals
- Scott Joss – fiddle, mandolin
- Jim Lauderdale – background vocals
- Roger Miller – background vocals
- Gary Morse – steel guitar
- Tim O'Brien – mandolin, background vocals
- Dean Parks – acoustic guitar
- Taras Prodaniuk – six-string bass guitar, bass guitar
- Amy Ray – background vocals
- Don Reed – fiddle
- Emily Saliers – background vocals
- Greg Smith – baritone saxophone
- Lee Thornburg – trombone, trumpet
- Carmen Twilley – background vocals
- Dusty Wakeman – six-string bass guitar, hand claps
- Gary White – hand claps
- Dwight Yoakam – acoustic guitar, electric guitar, hand claps, lead vocals, background vocals

Track information and credits verified from the album's liner notes.

== Chart performance ==
=== Weekly charts ===
Chart (1999)	Peak position
Canadian Country Albums (RPM)	5
US Billboard 200	80
US Top Country Albums (Billboard)	10

=== Year-end charts ===
Chart (1999)	Position
US Top Country Albums (Billboard)	45

=== Singles ===
Year	Single	Chart positions			
Year	Single	US Country	US	CAN Country	CAN AC
1999	"Crazy Little Thing Called Love"	12	64	1	19
1999	"Thinking About Leaving"	54	—	59	—
"—" denotes releases that did not chart

== Certifications ==
Region	Certification	Certified units/sales
United States (RIAA)	Gold	500,000^{^}
^{^} Shipments figures based on certification alone.
