= Dwightyoakamacoustic.net =

dwightyoakamacoustic.net

Studio album by Dwight Yoakam
- Released: May 30, 2000
- Genre: Country
- Length: 77:49
- Label: Reprise
- Producer: Pete Anderson

Dwight Yoakam chronology
| Last Chance for a Thousand Years (1999) | dwightyoakamacoustic.net (2000) | Tomorrow's Sounds Today (2000) |

Professional ratings
Review scores
| Source | Rating |
|---|---|
| AllMusic | 3/5 stars |
| About.com | 5/5 stars |
| Entertainment Weekly | A− |

dwightyoakamacoustic.net is the tenth studio album released in 2000 by American country music artist Dwight Yoakam. It features 25 of his songs recorded in an acoustic manner, save for "Little Sister" which also features Pete Anderson on electric guitar. The album peaked at #24 on the Billboard Top Country Albums chart and #195 on The Billboard 200.

== Recording ==
As Yoakam became more interested in film, his studio releases became more infrequent, and this package would be one of several releases that would revisit old material to help fulfill the singer's recording contract with Reprise. While containing no new songs, dwightyoakamacoutic.net offered a new perspective on earlier hits like "A Thousand Miles from Nowhere" and "Please, Please Baby" and also capitalized on the "unplugged" fad that was so prevalent in the Nineties. Featuring an a cappella version of "Guitars, Cadillacs, the album is a tour de force of vocal virtuosity and a revelation in terms of the power of Yoakam’s rhythm guitar. Steve Huey of AllMusic writes, "This ultra-stripped-down setting gives Yoakam a chance to establish an intimacy of performance that relies simply on the expressiveness of his voice and his ability to fill up space with compelling guitar work."

== Track listing ==
All songs written by Dwight Yoakam except where noted.

1. "Bury Me" – 3:13
2. "1000 Miles" – 4:02
3. "Little Sister" (Doc Pomus, Mort Shuman) – 3:20
4. "Please, Please Baby" – 2:05
5. "It Won't Hurt" – 4:00
6. "I'll Be Gone" – 2:30
7. "Johnson's Love" – 4:25
8. "Little Ways" – 2:57
9. "This Drinkin' Will Kill Me" – 2:44
10. "Nothing's Changed Here" (Yoakam, Kostas) – 2:59
11. "Throughout All Time" – 2:58
12. "Sad, Sad Music" –2:10
13. "It Only Hurts When I Cry" (Yoakam, Roger Miller) – 2:27
14. "Buenas Noches from a Lonely Room (She Wore Red Dresses)" – 3:48
15. "The Distance Between You and Me" – 2:06
16. "A Thousand Miles from Nowhere" – 3:14
17. "Two Doors Down" (Yoakam, Kostas) – 4:38
18. "Readin', Rightin', Rt. 23" – 4:07
19. "If There Was a Way" – 2:32
20. "Fast as You" – 3:56
21. "Home for Sale" – 3:01
22. "A Long Way Home" – 2:51
23. "Lonesome Roads" – 2:49
24. "Things Change" – 3:08
25. "Guitars, Cadillacs" – 1:49

== Chart performance ==
| Chart (2000) | Peak position |
|---|---|
| U.S. Billboard Top Country Albums | 24 |
| U.S. Billboard 200 | 195 |
| Canadian RPM Country Albums | 6 |
