= Scott Joss =

- Born: 1962, Santa Monica, California, USA
- Genres: Country
- Instrument(s): Fiddle, mandolin, guitar
- Years active: 1980–present

Scott Joss (born 1962) is a songwriter, guitarist, mandolin player, singer, and fiddle player primarily in the American Country music tradition. He has performed with Merle Haggard, Dwight Yoakam, Kris Kristofferson, Pete Anderson, Tiny Moore, Roy Nichols, Dusty Wakeman, Chris Gantry, Jana Jae, and as a successful solo artist.

== Career ==
Born in Santa Monica, California in 1962 and raised in Redding, California, Joss learned to play fiddle from Jana Jae, the one-time wife and fiddle player for Buck Owens and his Buckaroos. Praised as "the heir to the Bakersfield throne" because of his early association with Bakersfield Sound musicians, Joss' playing has been key to hit tunes scored by Merle Haggard & The Strangers and Dwight Yoakam. Scott Joss was inducted into the National Fiddler Hall of Fame in 2020.

Scott Joss

== Discography ==
=== Solo ===
- 1996: Souvenirs (Little Dog) – Reached #7 on the Americana Music charts
- 2000: A New Reason to Care (Little Dog)
- 2018: How Far to Jordan (Miracle Mile Records) – Featuring Kris Kristofferson on two songs

=== With Dwight Yoakam ===
- 1988: Dwight Yoakam – Buenas Noches from a Lonely Room (Reprise)
- 1990: Dwight Yoakam – If There Was a Way (Reprise)
- 1993: Dwight Yoakam – This Time (Reprise)
- 1995: Dwight Yoakam – Gone (Reprise)
- 1995: Dwight Yoakam – Dwight Live (Reprise)
- 1997: Dwight Yoakam – Under the Covers (Reprise)
- 1997: Dwight Yoakam – Come on Christmas (Reprise)
- 1998: Dwight Yoakam – A Long Way Home (Reprise)
- 2000: Dwight Yoakam – Tomorrow's Sounds Today (Reprise)
- 2001: Dwight Yoakam – South of Heaven, West of Hell (Warner Bros.)
- 2003: Dwight Yoakam – Population Me (Audium)

=== With Merle Haggard ===
- 2003: Merle Haggard – Haggard Like Never Before (Hag Records)
- 2005: Merle Haggard – Chicago Wind (Capitol)
- 2007: Merle Haggard – The Bluegrass Sessions (McCoury Music)
- 2010: Merle Haggard – I Am What I Am (Vanguard)
- 2011: Merle Haggard – Working in Tennessee (Vanguard)
