= I Was There =

I Was There may refer to:

- "I Was There", a song by Green Day from their 1990 album 39/Smooth
- "I Was There", a song by Dwight Yoakam and Buck Owens from Yoakam's 2001 album Tomorrow's Sounds Today
- "I Was There (And I'm Told I Had a Good Time)", a song by The Monkees from their 2016 album Good Times!
- "I Was There", a song by the Statler Brothers from their 1977 album The Country America Loves
