= I Am What I Am (Merle Haggard album) =

Studio album by Merle Haggard
- Released: April 20, 2010
- Genre: Country
- Length: 40:25
- Label: Vanguard
- Producer: Lou Bradley; Merle Haggard

Merle Haggard chronology
The Bluegrass Sessions (2007)	I Am What I Am (2010)	Working in Tennessee (2011)

Professional ratings
Aggregate scores
Source	Rating
Metacritic	81/100
Review scores
Source	Rating
AllMusic	4/5 stars
American Songwriter	4/5 stars
The A.V. Club	A−
Billboard	4/5 stars
Christgau’s Consumer Guide	B+
Mojo	4/5 stars
Rolling Stone	4/5 stars
Spin	9/10
The Telegraph	4/5 stars
Uncut	4/5 stars

I Am What I Am is the sixty-second studio album by American country music artist Merle Haggard. It was released on April 20, 2010 by Vanguard Records. The album peaked at number 18 on the Billboard Top Country Albums chart.

The final song, “It's Gonna Be Me,” was only released on Amazon.com, despite having received positive review as a song which stands out with a heavy bass line and social-critical lyrics.

== Track listing ==
All songs written by Merle Haggard except where noted.

1. "I've Seen It Go Away" – 3:00
2. "Pretty When It's New" – 3:12
3. "Oil Tanker Train" – 3:02
4. "Live and Love Always" – 2:30
5. "The Road to My Heart" (Freddy Powers) – 2:50
6. "How Did You Find Me Here" (M. Haggard, Theresa Lane Haggard) – 3:55
7. "We're Falling in Love Again" – 3:31
8. "Bad Actor" (Doug Colosio, M. Haggard, Scott Joss) – 3:28
9. "Down at the End of the Road" – 3:10
10. "Stranger in the City" – 2:09
11. "Mexican Bands" – 3:27
12. "I Am What I Am" – 2:38
13. "It's Gonna Be Me" – 3:27 (Amazon exclusive)

== Personnel ==
- Merle Haggard - fiddle, guitar, lead vocals, background vocals
- Norm Hamlet - steel guitar
- Biff Adam - bass guitar, drums
- Don Markham - trumpet
- Gary Church - trombone
- Red Lane - guitar
- Doug Colosio - piano
- Ben Haggard - drums, guitar, soloist, background vocals
- Theresa Lane Haggard - lead and background vocals
- Tim Howard - guitar, soloist
- Rob Ickes - Dobro
- Scott Joss - fiddle, guitar, background vocals
- George Receli - drums, percussion, background vocals
- Reggie Young - guitar

== Chart performance ==
Chart (2010)	Peak position
US Billboard 200	77
US Top Country Albums (Billboard)	18
US Independent Albums (Billboard)	11
