= What Do You Know About Love =

Single by Dwight Yoakam

from the album Tomorrow's Sounds Today
- Released: September 25, 2000
- Genre: Country
- Length: 2:56
- Label: Reprise
- Songwriter: Dwight Yoakam
- Producer: Pete Anderson

Dwight Yoakam singles chronology
"Thinking About Leaving" (1999)	"What Do You Know About Love" (2000)	"I Want You to Want Me" (2001)

"What Do You Know About Love" is a song written and recorded by American country music artist Dwight Yoakam. It was released in September 2000 as the first single from the album Tomorrow's Sounds Today. The song reached #26 on the Billboard Hot Country Singles & Tracks chart. To date, it is Yoakam's last top 40 hit.

== Chart performance ==
Chart (2000–2001)	Peak position
Canada Country Singles (RPM)	69 (Note: "What Do You Know About Love" had not yet peaked when RPM ceased publication in November 2000.)
US Hot Country Songs (Billboard)	26
