= Nothing's Changed Here =

Single by Dwight Yoakam

from the album If There Was a Way
- B-side: "Sad, Sad Music"
- Released: July 29, 1991
- Genre: Country
- Length: 2:56
- Label: Reprise 19256
- Songwriters: Dwight Yoakam, Kostas
- Producer: Pete Anderson

Dwight Yoakam singles chronology
"You're the One" (1991)	"Nothing's Changed Here" (1991)	"It Only Hurts When I Cry" (1991)

"Nothing's Changed Here" is a song co-written and recorded by American country music artist Dwight Yoakam. It was co-written with the country songwriter Kostas and was released in July 1991 as the third single from Yoakam's album If There Was a Way. It peaked at number 15 on the Billboard Hot Country Songs chart and it became his biggest hit from this album in Canada, reaching number 2 on the RPM country singles chart.

The song is not to be confused with "Nothing", also written by Yoakam and Kostas, that became a Top 20 hit in 1995 from Yoakam's album Gone.

== Chart performance ==
Chart (1991)	Peak position
Canada Country Singles (RPM)	2
US Hot Country Songs (Billboard)	15

=== Year-end charts ===
Chart (1991)	Position
Canada Country Tracks (RPM)	13
