= Tomorrow's Sounds Today =

Studio album by Dwight Yoakam
- Released: October 31, 2000
- Recorded: 2000 at The Dog Bone; Burbank, CA
- Genre: Country
- Length: 48:18
- Label: Reprise
- Producer: Pete Anderson

Dwight Yoakam chronology
dwightyoakamacoustic.net (2000)	Tomorrow's Sounds Today (2000)	South of Heaven, West of Hell (2001)

Professional ratings
Aggregate scores
Source	Rating
Metacritic	75/100
Review scores
Source	Rating
AllMusic	4/5 stars
Entertainment Weekly	C+
Rolling Stone	3.5/5 stars

Tomorrow's Sounds Today is the eleventh studio album by American country music artist Dwight Yoakam. This album was released on October 31, 2000. It rose to No. 7 on the Billboard Country Albums chart. There were two charting singles among its tracks: "What Do You Know About Love" at No. 26 and "I Want You to Want Me" (a cover of the 1979 Cheap Trick hit) at No. 49 on the Hot Country Songs chart. Also included are two duets with Buck Owens, who was a big influence on Yoakam's musical style. It was also Yoakam's last studio album for the Reprise label. After that album's release, Yoakam left Reprise for Warner Bros. in 2001.

== Background ==
In the Nineties, Yoakam had been a musician who dabbled in movies, but by 2000 he was absorbed in a film project of his own called South of Heaven - West of Hell. This left his music career in the lurch in the latter part of the decade, with his releases becoming more sporadic. Yoakam and producer-guitarist Pete Anderson had helped revitalize the genre of country music in the late Eighties and early Nineties, scoring a triple platinum high point with This Time in 1993. However, with the release of Gone in 1995, Yoakam's commercial stock took a nosedive, and his growing preoccupation with acting left Anderson perplexed, with the producer later reflecting in 2003:

Dwight has, still has and has had the potential to be, you know, the most important country artist of his time. And that’s my personal opinion, and why he would leave, or descend from, or not maintain a mantle of that structure to become a - um, no, I barely, I don’t know what kind of – a character actor? A sub-player? You know, he’s sort of gotten typecast pretty rapidly as like, kind of a psycho or he plays these mean parts…I just don’t understand why being the most important country artist of your decade isn’t as important or something that you could sustain and then control your acting career.

While Yoakam nursed his acting bug, country radio's youth-obsessed fixation continued and the singer developed a strained relationship with his label Reprise. The sole hit during this period was a cover of the Queen song “Crazy Little Thing Called Love,” which hit #12 on the country singles chart and rose to #64 on Billboard’s Hot 100. The song appeared on the 1999 compilation Last Chance for a Thousand Years: Dwight Yoakam's Greatest Hits from the 90's, which was followed by an acoustic album of remakes the following year, and these two releases lend credence to the notion that Yoakam was consumed to a degree by his film-making aspirations. As biographer Don McLeese put it, if the singer “had sounded a little distracted on the offhand Tomorrow’s Sounds Today, he was plainly preoccupied with South of Heaven – West of Hell – a film written, directed, and produced by Dwight Yoakam, starring Dwight Yoakam, with music by Dwight Yoakam.”

== Recording and composition ==
Yoakam's 1998 release A Long Way Home was a return to a more country sound, and Tomorrow’s Sounds Today takes this approach even further; in fact, it is arguably his straightest country studio album since 1988's Buenos Noches from Lonely Room. Like A Long Way Home, this LP has a brighter musical atmosphere than the “noirish streak” that ran through previous works like This Time and Gone. On the first single “What Do You Know About Love” the narrator is cautiously optimistic over a new love, admitting “My heart’s so often been wrong,” while on the opener “Love Caught Up with Me,” the narrator surrenders completely with the lines “Baby, I couldn’t hide, no matter how hard I tried…” Pete Anderson's guitar work on “Free to Go” evokes the Allman Brothers over a Johnny Cash rhythm as the song ponders the elusive nature of love. Anderson also displays some fine fretwork on the rocking “A Place to Cry,” but for the most part Yoakam and Anderson keep it country, emphasizing Gary Morse's pedal steel and returning to their roots, as if they sensed their partnership was nearing its end. In his AllMusic review of the album Hal Horowitz writes:

Yoakam goes the Hank Williams Sr. route on "A Promise You Can't Keep" and especially "The Heartaches Are Free," which sounds so similar to a Hank Sr. tune in melody and vocal inflection, you'll find yourself double checking the liner notes to be sure it's a Yoakam original…song titles like "A World of Blue," "A Place to Cry," "The Sad Side of Town," and "Time Spent Missing You" show that Yoakam is still drenched in the spilt tears, heartbroken brand of country that has proven to be so lucrative, artistically and commercially, in the past. Best of all, he makes it seems easy.

Further cementing the full circle vibe are the two duets with Buck Owens that conclude the album. Yoakam coaxed Owens out of semi-retirement in 1988 and scored his first #1 country hit with their remake of “Streets of Bakersfield,” and they return to the Tex-Mex flavour with “Alright, I’m Wrong” (Anderson's only writing credit on a Yoakam LP) and the spirited “I Was There.”

Perhaps trying to capture lightning in a bottle after the recent hit with Queen's “Crazy Little Thing Called Love,” Yoakam tried his hand at another 70's rock classic, Cheap Trick’s “I Want You to Want Me,” but it was not as successful.

== Reception ==
AllMusic praises the LP, opining, “With Tomorrow's Sounds Today, Dwight Yoakam has fashioned a contemporary roots-conscious country album whose qualities, like the artist's distinctive style, are timeless.” However, in his book A Thousand Miles from Nowhere, ex-Rolling Stone writer Don McCleese takes a dim view, calling it “an album of retrenchment, one that reinforces Yoakam’s persona as a country artist rather than extending it, with too many of the cuts sounding like retreads.”

== Track listing ==
All songs written by Dwight Yoakam except where noted.

No.	Title	Writer(s)	Length
1.	"Love Caught Up to Me"		3:50
2.	"What Do You Know About Love"		2:56
3.	"Time Spent Missing You"		3:05
4.	"Free to Go"		4:48
5.	"A Promise You Can't Keep"		3:11
6.	"A Place to Cry"		4:35
7.	"The Sad Side of Town"	Dwight Yoakam, Buck Owens	2:52
8.	"Dreams of Clay"		3:51
9.	"For Love's Sake"		3:06
10.	"The Heartaches Are Free"		2:55
11.	"A World of Blue"		2:21
12.	"I Want You to Want Me"	Rick Nielsen	3:28
13.	"Alright, I'm Wrong" (duet with Buck Owens)	Pete Anderson, Cisco	4:16
14.	"I Was There" (duet with Buck Owens)	Owens	3:04

== Personnel ==
From liner notes.

- Pete Anderson – electric guitar, baritone guitar, percussion
- Al Bonhomme – acoustic guitar
- Jim Christie – drums
- Jonathan Clark – background vocals
- Skip Edwards – keyboards
- Chris Hillman – mandolin
- Flaco Jiménez – accordion
- Scott Joss – fiddle
- Jim Lauderdale – background vocals
- Gary Morse — steel guitar, lap steel guitar
- Buck Owens – duet vocals on "Alright, I'm Wrong" and "I Was There"
- Taras Prodaniuk – bass guitar
- Don Reed – fiddle
- Dwight Yoakam – lead vocals, acoustic guitar
- Blake Oswald – production assistant

== Charts ==
=== Weekly charts ===
Chart (2000)	Peak position
Canadian Country Albums (RPM)	28
US Billboard 200	68
US Top Country Albums (Billboard)	7

=== Year-end charts ===
Chart (2001)	Position
Canadian Country Albums (Nielsen SoundScan)	88
US Top Country Albums (Billboard)	58

=== Singles ===
Year	Single	Chart positions
Year	Single	US Country
2000	"What Do You Know About Love"	26
2001	"I Want You to Want Me"	49
2001	"I Was There" (with Buck Owens)	—
"—" denotes releases that did not chart

== Bibliography ==
- McLeese, Don (2012). Dwight Yoakam: A Thousand Miles from Nowhere. University of Texas Press. ISBN 978-0292723818.
