= The Bluegrass Sessions (Merle Haggard album) =

Studio album by Merle Haggard
- Released: October 2, 2007
- Genre: Bluegrass
- Length: 41:05
- Label: McCoury Music; Hag Records
- Producer: Ronnie Reno

Merle Haggard chronology
Last of the Breed (2007)	The Bluegrass Sessions (2007)	I Am What I Am (2010)

Professional ratings
Review scores
Source	Rating
AllMusic	4/5 stars
Freight Train Boogie	4/5 stars

The Bluegrass Sessions is the sixty-first studio album by American country music singer and songwriter Merle Haggard. This album was released on October 2, 2007, on the McCoury Music and Hag Records.

The bulk of the album was cut live in the studio in one day, with very little overdubbing. Guests include Alison Krauss, Marty Stuart and dobro virtuoso Rob Ickes. It was produced by Ronnie Reno, former rhythm guitarist of The Strangers.

== Track listing ==
All songs written by Merle Haggard except where noted.

1. "Runaway Momma" – 3:49
2. "Pray" – 2:53
3. "What Happened?" – 3:42
4. "Jimmie Rodgers Blues" – 4:17
5. "Learning to Live with Myself" – 4:09
6. "Mama's Hungry Eyes" (with Alison Krauss) – 3:37
7. "I Wonder Where To Find You" – 2:54
8. "Holding Things Together" – 3:25
9. "Big City" (Haggard, Dean Holloway) – 3:38
10. "Momma's Prayers" – 4:08
11. "Wouldn't That Be Something" (Merle Haggard, Freddy Powers) – 3:28
12. "Blues Stay Away From Me" (Alton Delmore, Rabon Delmore, Henry Glover, Wayne Raney) – 3:45

== Chart performance ==
Chart (2007)	Peak position
U.S. Billboard Top Country Albums	43
U.S. Billboard Independent Albums	34

== Personnel ==
- Merle Haggard – Guitar, Vocals
- Ronnie Reno – Producer, Mixing
- John Caldwell – Engineer
- Charlie Cushman – Banjo, Guitar
- Randy Garrett – Cover Illustration
- Lee Groitzsch – Engineer, Mixing
- Aubrey Haynie – Fiddle
- Rob Ickes – Dobro, Slide Guitar
- Ben Isaacs – Upright Bass
- Carl Jackson – Guitar, Tenor Vocal, Vocal Arrangement, Vocal Producer
- Scott Joss – Fiddle
- J.D. Wilkes – Harmonica
- Alison Krauss – Vocals
- Brenda McClearen – Photography
- Teeroy Morris – Graphic Design
- Marty Stuart – Guitar, Mandolin
