= Last of the Breed (album) =

Studio album by Willie Nelson, Merle Haggard and Ray Price
- Released: March 20, 2007
- Genres: Country, Western swing
- Length: 69:44
- Label: Lost Highway
- Producer: Fred Foster

Willie Nelson chronology
| Songbird (2006) | Last of the Breed (2007) | It's Magic (2007) |

Merle Haggard chronology
| Kickin' Out the Footlights...Again (2006) | Last of the Breed (2007) | The Bluegrass Sessions (2007) |

Ray Price chronology
| Run That by Me One More Time (2003) | Last of the Breed (2007) | Beauty Is… The Final Sessions (2014) |

Last of the Breed is a two-disc album by American country music artists Willie Nelson, Merle Haggard and Ray Price, released in 2007. It debuted at number 64 on the U.S. Billboard 200, selling about 13,000 copies in its first week. The album has 100,000 copies in the U.S. as of May 2015. The album was ranked number 33 on Rolling Stone's list of the Top 50 Albums of 2007.

== Critical reception ==
Professional ratings
Review scores
| Source | Rating |
|---|---|
| AllMusic | 3.5/5 stars |
| Robert Christgau | A− |
| The Music Box | 4/5 stars |
| Pitchfork | 6.3/10 |
| Slant Magazine | 4/5 stars |

Mark Deming of AllMusic wrote "...at its best Last of the Breed really sounds the way these things did in the old days, and Nelson, Haggard, and Price achieve something more than nostalgia—they offer a stirring reminder of the strength of this music when country music spoke to something deeper than just a marketing demographic." In his review, music critic Robert Christgau wrote "Not much kidding around here—they're feeling their varying ages. But they ain't dead yet." Steven Deusner writes of the style, "...most of these songs sound like the trio are trying to re-create a style long past rather anchor these songs in the here and now. That retrospective orientation is strange because none of these artists could be accused of being stuck in the past; in fact, their willingness to adapt to new styles without compromising their standards is partly what makes them the last of their breed. So it's a shame Last of the Breed isn't better—not only do they have a lot to say about these old songs, they also have a lot to say through them." While Jonathan Keefe of Slant Magazine takes issue with the title, he praises the album, calling it "a collection that's nearly flawless in its execution."

== Track listing ==
=== Disc one ===
1. "My Life's Been a Pleasure" (Jesse Ashlock) – 3:03
2. "My Mary" (Jimmie Davis, Stuart Hamblen) – 3:14
3. "Back to Earth" (Willie Nelson) – 3:25
4. "Heartaches by the Number" (Harlan Howard) – 3:04
5. "Mom and Dad's Waltz" (Lefty Frizzell) – 3:26
6. "Some Other World" (Floyd Tillman) – 3:26
7. "Why Me" (Kris Kristofferson) – 3:44
8. "Lost Highway" (Leon Payne) – 2:54
9. "I Love You a Thousand Ways" (Frizzell, Jim Beck) – 2:57
10. "Please Don't Leave Me Any More Darlin'" (Ashlock) – 3:34
11. "I Gotta Have My Baby Back" (Tillman) – 3:12

=== Disc two ===
1. "Goin' Away Party" (Cindy Walker) – 3:25
2. "If I Ever Get Lucky" (Merle Haggard, Lou Bradley) – 4:11
3. "Sweet Memories" (Mickey Newbury) – 3:24
4. "Pick Me Up on Your Way Down" (Howard) – 3:16
5. "I Love You Because" (Payne) – 3:03
6. "Sweet Jesus" (Haggard) – 3:38
7. "Still Water Runs the Deepest" (Ashlock) – 2:40
8. "I Love You So Much It Hurts" (Tillman) – 3:10
9. "That Silver-Haired Daddy of Mine" (Gene Autry, Jimmy Long) – 3:25
10. "I'll Keep On Loving You" (Tillman) – 3:05
11. "Night Watch" (Walker) – 2:47

== Personnel ==
- Merle Haggard – vocals, guitar
- Ray Price – vocals
- Willie Nelson – vocals, gut string guitar
- Eddie Bayers – drums
- Buddy Emmons – pedal steel guitar
- Vince Gill – harmony vocals (on "Heartaches by the Number")
- Johnny Gimble – fiddle, mandolin
- Aubrey Haynie – fiddle, mandolin
- John Hobbs – keyboards, Hammond organ, Wurlitzer
- Elana James – fiddle
- The Jordanaires – background vocals
- Kris Kristofferson – vocals, harmony vocals (on "Why Me")
- Brent Mason – electric guitar
- Gordon Mote – piano
- Don Potter – acoustic guitar
- Boots Randolph – saxophone
- Michael Rhodes – bass
- D. Bergen White – chant

Production and additional personnel

- Fred Foster – producer, mixing
- Hank Williams; mastering
- Brent Maher – engineer, mixing
- Charles Yingling – engineer, mixing assistant
- Brian Krause – assistant engineer, mixing assistant

== Chart performance ==
| Chart (2007) | Peak position |
|---|---|
| US Billboard 200 | 64 |
| US Top Country Albums (Billboard) | 7 |

== Awards ==
Willie Nelson and Ray Price won a Grammy for Best Country Collaboration with Vocals for the song "Lost Highway."
