= Hillbilly Deluxe (Dwight Yoakam album) =

Studio album by Dwight Yoakam
- Released: July 7, 1987
- Studio: Capitol (Hollywood)
- Genre: Country
- Length: 33:54
- Label: Reprise
- Producer: Pete Anderson

Dwight Yoakam chronology
Guitars, Cadillacs, Etc., Etc. (1986)	Hillbilly Deluxe (1987)	Buenas Noches from a Lonely Room (1988)

Singles from Hillbilly Deluxe
- 1. "Little Sister" Released: February 1987; 2. "Little Ways" Released: June 1987; 3. "Please, Please Baby" Released: November 2, 1987; 4. "Always Late with Your Kisses" Released: February 1988

Professional ratings
Review scores
Source	Rating
Allmusic	4/5 stars

Hillbilly Deluxe is the second studio album by American country music singer-songwriter, Dwight Yoakam. Released in 1987, it was Yoakam's second consecutive No. 1 album on the Billboard Country Albums chart. Four tracks were released as singles with each becoming Top 10 hits on the Hot Country Singles chart in 1987 and 1988.

== Background ==
With the success of his debut album Guitars, Cadillacs, Etc., Etc., which hit No. 1 on the Billboard country albums chart, Yoakam emerged as one of country music's hottest stars. Aided by producer and guitarist Pete Anderson, he put a fresh spin on the honky-tonk sound of his Bakersfield hero Buck Owens to create a unique style that revitalized interest in traditional country music, as opposed to the more pop-friendly approach that dominated Nashville in the early and mid-Eighties. Yoakam developed his sound in the bars and punk rock clubs of Los Angeles and released a six-song EP that would eventually get him signed to Reprise. However, as his star rose, Yoakam did not mince words in interviews when asked about the music industry in Nashville – such as his disdain for executives at Columbia Records after they dropped Johnny Cash from the label, among other things – and quickly gained a reputation as an opinionated outsider. Yoakam was largely unimpressed when he first visited Music City earlier in the decade and touted the open-minded creativity of the west coast scene. Critics responded by questioning the Kentucky-born songwriter's hillbilly credentials, and his refusal to play ball with Nashville likely cost him radio play and award nominations from the powerful Country Music Association, although he was immensely popular with the Los Angeles-based Academy of Country Music. As one writer put it, "Remaining in Los Angeles distanced Yoakam from the Nashville music industry to advance his recording career through radio play, but it allowed him to develop as a live performer, to work the circuit, sharpen his chops, find his audience, and forge his own path."

== Recording and composition ==
Hillbilly Deluxe appeared in April 1987, a mere thirteen months after his debut LP. Producer Pete Anderson later recalled:

When we started, Dwight had twenty-one songs that were really good, that we played on the bandstand. So I said to him, "Let’s do seven of your songs and three covers on every album. So right now you’ve got three albums’ worth of material." So he had "South of Cincinnati," "I Sang Dixie," and "Johnson’s Love" that were all slow tempo tunes. It wasn't that any of them was basically better, but we couldn't put all three on the same record.

The result was a second album of remarkable high quality, with AllMusic noting, "Hillbilly Deluxe is proof that beyond a shadow of a doubt, Dwight Yoakam's Guitars, Cadillacs, Etc., Etc. was no fluke. There's no sophomore slump here…In fact, it can be heard and viewed as Yoakam and producer/guitarist Pete Anderson cementing the commitment to Bakersfield-styled honky tonk music." The album opens with the newly-written "Little Ways," which peaked at No. 8 on the country singles chart. (It topped the country charts in Canada.) In the "Beyond Nashville" episode of the 2003 documentary Lost Highway, Yoakam admits the elongated opening vocal was an approximation of Buck Owens trademark singing style on songs like "I've Got a Tiger By the Tail". "Little Ways" is distinctly an homage to Buck, a signature combination of the drawn-out phrasing and hard-twang guitar that had distinguished so many of his hits. (In the liner notes of the LP, Yoakam wrote: "VERY SPECIAL THANKS: to Buck Owens for all his records that still serve as an inspiration for the California honky-tonk sound.") Additional musical influences can be found in the cover songs Yoakam chose to record for the album, including Stonewall Jackson’s 1959 hit "Smoke Along the Tracks," a radical reworking of Lefty Frizzell’s "Always Late with Your Kisses," and Elvis Presley’s 1961 song "Little Sister," which would be the album's first single and biggest hit, peaking at No. 7.

As on his debut LP, Hillbilly Deluxe contains seven original songs that display a depth and maturity on par with any country music songwriter at the time, especially the ballads "Johnson’s Love" and "1,000 Miles." Clocking in at nearly four-and-a-half minutes, the former tells the mournful story of a man named Johnson who pines for his lost love Maureen, calling her name "deep in the night or sometimes right at dawn." In his book A Thousand Miles from Nowhere, biographer Don McLeese states the song is steeped in the Kentucky memories of Yoakam's coal-mining grandfather Luther Tibbs, and quotes the singer, "My grandfather is the central character in ‘Johnson’s Love,’ but not him literally. It's just the tool that allows the writer to move beyond himself to something larger than himself. That's the task at hand. And that's what the best writing can be, using what you know to move beyond yourself." McLeese contends the song "sounds like Yoakam’s version of George Jones’s classic ‘He Stopped Loving Her Today.’" However, the main character in that song is finally set free from his heartbreak by his own death, but In "Johnson’s Love" there is no such deliverance, with the narrator observing:

I heard the preacher at the service
Say from love he’s finally free
But I say love it knows no season
It haunts the soul eternally

Anderson's production on the ballad is irretrievably country, as it is on the foreboding "1,000 Miles," which finds a man boarding "flight 209" and ruminating on his broken marriage. The song's elusive lyrics are filled with self-pity and self-loathing ("I owe so much to pride, it’s true: it brought an end to me and you...") and it features Yoakam's stellar singing and unique phrasing. Faster in tempo but no less dark is the suicidal "This Drinkin' Will Kill Me," a tune Yoakam demoed in Los Angeles in 1981 and chose to close the album with. Similarly, the rollicking "Please, Please Baby", which boasts impressive guitar work from Anderson, and the jaunty "Throughout All Time" are upbeat numbers with despairing, regretful lyrics.

On Guitars, Cadillacs, Etc., Etc., Yoakam paid tribute to his roots with songs like "Miner’s Prayer" and "Bury Me," and he includes another tribute on Hillbilly Deluxe with the poignant "Readin', Rightin', Rt. 23," which describes the migration of a younger generation from the Kentucky homes of their coal-mining parents to the factories of the city, not knowing "that old highway would lead them to a world of misery." Sounding wistful, joyful, and cynical all at the same time, the tune is a brilliant display of songwriting, with Yoakam using simple language to create vivid pictures of a people and a way of life with deep family roots and ‘sweet hillbilly charm."

== Critical reception ==
Thom Jurek of AllMusic writes, "Yoakam's voice is a dead cross of Merle Haggard's early voice and Lefty Frizzell's – a fine cover of the latter's "Always Late (With Your Kisses)" is included here – and as such, it is one of the purest, most soulful voices in this era."

== Track listing ==
No.	Title	Writer(s)	Length
1.	"Little Ways"	Dwight Yoakam	3:18
2.	"Smoke Along the Track"	Alan Rose, Don Helms	3:13
3.	"Johnson's Love"	Yoakam	4:25
4.	"Please, Please Baby"	Yoakam	3:36
5.	"Readin', Rightin', Rt. 23"	Yoakam	3:32
6.	"Always Late with Your Kisses"	Lefty Frizzell, Blackie Crawford	2:10
7.	"1,000 Miles"	Yoakam	4:10
8.	"Throughout All Time"	Yoakam	3:54
9.	"Little Sister"	Doc Pomus, Mort Shuman	3:01
10.	"This Drinkin' Will Kill Me"	Yoakam	2:35
Total length:			33:54

== Personnel ==
- Dwight Yoakam – lead vocals, background vocals, acoustic guitar
- Pete Anderson – electric guitar, 6-string bass guitar, background vocals
- Tom Brumley – pedal steel guitar, background vocals
- Greg Leisz – lap steel guitar
- JD Foster – bass guitar, background vocals
- Jeff Donavan – drums
- Brantley Kearns – fiddle, background vocals
- Skip Edwards – piano
- Herb Pedersen – background vocals
- Dusty Wakeman – background vocals

== Production ==
- Pete Anderson – producer
- Judy Clapp – assistant engineer, mixing assistant
- Michael Dumas – assistant producer
- Dusty Wakeman – engineer, mixer
- Eddy Schreyer – audio mastering

== Charts ==
=== Weekly charts ===
Chart (1987)	Peak position
Australia Albums (Kent Music Report)	55
Canadian Albums (RPM)	27
New Zealand Albums (RMNZ)	17
Swedish Albums (Sverigetopplistan)	3
US Billboard 200	55
US Top Country Albums (Billboard)	1

=== Year-end charts ===
Chart (1987)	Position
US Top Country Albums (Billboard)	14
Chart (1988)	Position
US Top Country Albums (Billboard)	15

== Certifications ==
Region	Certification	Certified units/sales
Australia (ARIA)	Gold	35,000^{^}
^{^} Shipments figures based on certification alone.
