= If There Was a Way =

Studio album by Dwight Yoakam
- Released: October 30, 1990
- Recorded: Capitol (Hollywood)
- Genre: Country
- Length: 48:00
- Label: Reprise
- Producer: Pete Anderson

Dwight Yoakam chronology
| Just Lookin' for a Hit (1989) | If There Was a Way (1990) | This Time (1993) |

Singles from If There Was a Way
- 1. "Turn It On, Turn It Up, Turn Me Loose" Released: September 26, 1990; 2. "You're the One" Released: February 1991; 3. "Nothing's Changed Here" Released: July 29, 1991; 4. "It Only Hurts When I Cry" Released: December 21, 1991; 5. "The Heart That You Own" Released: April 20, 1992; 6. "Send a Message to My Heart" Released: August 1992

Professional ratings
Review scores
| Source | Rating |
|---|---|
| AllMusic | 4.5/5 stars |

If There Was a Way is the fourth studio album by American country music artist Dwight Yoakam, released on October 30, 1990. Five of its tracks would rise into the Top 40 of the Billboard Hot Country Singles chart in 1991 and 1992. They were "Turn It On, Turn It Up, Turn Me Loose" at No. 11, "You're the One" at No. 5, "Nothing's Changed Here" at No. 15, "It Only Hurts When I Cry" at No. 7 "Send a Message to My Heart", (a duet with fellow Pikeville, Kentucky native Patty Loveless) at No. 47, and finally the No. 18 "The Heart That You Own".

== Background ==
After recording three consecutive number one albums, Yoakam released the greatest hits collection Just Lookin’ for a Hit in 1989. His first three albums, beginning with Guitars, Cadillacs, Etc., Etc. in 1986, contained several old songs he demoed in 1982, with producer and guitarist Pete Anderson recalling, “…we’d had twenty-one of his songs to record, and he wrote some new songs along the way. But not a whole album of new songs.” Consequently, his next LP would mostly be a clean slate. Yoakam's previous album, Buenos Noches from a Lonely Room, gave him his first two chart-topping country hits (“Streets of Bakersfield,” a duet with his hero Buck Owens, and “I Sang Dixie”) but it was the end of an era of sorts, with the singer later reflecting, “I look at it this way – those albums are trilogies, in a sense, in retrospect. It’s like, I told ‘em what I was gonna tell ‘em…I was tellin’ ‘em where I’d come from, the legacy and culture that shaped my music.” He expanded to Country Music's Patrick Carr: "The first three albums were probably my need to express the cornerstones, my foundation musically and the things I first heard from my parents growing up in Ohio, the things they brought with them from Kentucky..."

== Recording and composition ==
If There Was a Way features the most diverse set of material Yoakam had recorded up to that point, introducing rock and soul influences while retaining the Bakersfield honky-tonk sound that made him famous. The biggest departure is the title track, which incorporates a Hammond B-3 organ into the mix, giving the song more of a Muscle Shoals or Stax sound than Nashville or Bakersfield. Yoakam cited Percy Sledge as the primary influence on the recording. AllMusic comments, “The bluesy, doo-woppy, Doc Pomus-inspired rock balladry of the title track is another move toward the margins for Yoakam - especially with the shimmering B-3 work by Skip Edwards.” A driving doo-wop piano also infuses “I Don’t Need It Done” while “Takes a Lot to Rock You,” “Dangerous Man,” and the cover of Canned Heat’s magnanimous “Let’s Work Together” boast a more hard-edged rock sound foreshadowed by Yoakam's psychedelic cover of the Blasters's “Long White Cadillac” found on Just Lookin’ for a Hit the previous year.

Another change was Yoakam collaborating with fellow songwriters such as Kostas and Roger Miller. The album's first single, “Turn It On, Turn It Up, Turn Me Loose,” was written by Kostas and Wayland Patton, and it was producer Pete Anderson who brought the song to Yoakam, telling him, “…this is one song I came across that sounds like something you would have written for yourself.” Yoakam and Kostas teamed up to compose “Nothing’s Changed Here,” which Anderson gave a bluesy, swaggering arrangement, and Kostas had a hand in writing the aching “Send a Message to My Heart,” which Yoakam performs as a duet with Patty Loveless. Yoakam's other songwriting collaboration was on “It Only Hurts When I Cry” with country legend Roger Miller, and the song, which reached #7 on the country singles chart, contains the famous wordplay found in some of Miller's biggest hits. In 2015 Yoakam recalled writing with Miller to Rolling Stone: "It was so organic and so easy because of his naturalism and wit and ability. He was a true genius. Roger knew when to say, 'No, you’re right. That’s good. Leave it alone. We don’t need it.' Roger would defer very quickly because he had a great internal artistic barometer, and he’s just one of the true giants in pop music writing."

Although If There Was a Way shows Yoakam's “fragmented musical personality", it also contains unremittingly bitter and despairing country originals, such as “Sad, Sad Music” and the metaphorical “The Heart That You Own.” Although the latter only reached #18 on the country singles chart, it remains highly regarded (Bob Dylan covered the song in concert) and proved Yoakam could still write songs of heartache on par with previous classics like “Johnson’s Love,” “1,000 Miles,” and “I Sang Dixie.” A dominant theme found in Yoakam's new songs is the new aloofness or absence of a lover, as he croons on the bridge of "The Distance Between You and Me":

I lie awake and hear you breathing
Only inches from me in this bed
Not much space but it's all that we needed
To live alone not that out love is dead

On "Sad, Sad Music" the narrator declares, "I swear that I woke up with you this morning, but I can see that it's been days since you were here..." while "Nothing's Changed Here" contains the lines "I I feel you body lyin' next to mine, I reach out to touch you but you're not there for me to find..." Yoakam carries off these songs vocally with without a trace of irony, and the dark subject matter that dominates them, and the entire LP, may have played a part in his decision to conclude the album with the optimistic "Let's Work Together,' but, as Yoakam biographer Don McLeese writes, that particular cover song "served to show there were interpretive limits to what Dwight could do. He was far more convincing brooding about dark nights of the soul than celebrating the brotherhood of man.”

The album's biggest hit was the ballad “You’re the One,” which reached #5 and was the final song from his 1981 demo session to be used for a major label release. Thom Jurek of AllMusic calls “Since I Started Drinkin’ Again” (another old song played in Yoakam's 1986 set at the Roxy, which can be heard on the Rhino Deluxe Edition of Guitars, Cadillacs, Etc, Etc.) “…a bluegrass shitkicker, but it is one hell of a self-destructive broken-heart song that features some awesome fiddlework by Scott Joss and mandolin and backing vocals by Tim O'Brien.” Album opener “The Distance Between You and Me” also incorporates banjo but, with its unconventional arrangement and exasperated lyrics, sounded downright surreal compared to most of what was on country radio in 1990. (The non-performance sequences in the music videos Yoakam starred in for “Turn it On, Turn it Up, Turn Me Loose” and “Takes a Lot to Rock You” also verge on the bizarre.)

== Reception ==
The album rose to No. 7 on the Country Albums chart. AllMusic: “Here again the rock side of country, the soul side of rock, and the country side of soul are all wrapped here in Yoakam's voice backed by a band who have a complete understanding of the tune. Highly recommended.”

== Track listing ==
All songs written by Dwight Yoakam except where noted.

| No. | Title | Writer(s) | Length |
|---|---|---|---|
| 1. | "The Distance Between You and Me" | | 2:41 |
| 2. | "The Heart That You Own" | | 3:08 |
| 3. | "Takes a Lot to Rock You" | | 2:59 |
| 4. | "Nothing's Changed Here" | Dwight Yoakam, Kostas | 2:56 |
| 5. | "Sad, Sad Music" | | 3:53 |
| 6. | "Since I Started Drinkin' Again" | | 3:43 |
| 7. | "If There Was a Way" | | 2:54 |
| 8. | "Turn It On, Turn It Up, Turn Me Loose" | Kostas, Wayland Patton | 3:23 |
| 9. | "It Only Hurts When I Cry" | Yoakam, Roger Miller | 2:34 |
| 10. | "Send a Message to My Heart" (duet with Patty Loveless) | Kostas, Kathy Louvin | 3:15 |
| 11. | "I Don't Need It Done" | John Sieger | 4:45 |
| 12. | "You're the One" | | 3:59 |
| 13. | "Dangerous Man" | | 4:17^{A} |
| 14. | "Let's Work Together" | Wilbert Harrison | 3:33^{A} |
| Total length: | | | 48:00 |

- ^{A}Omitted from cassette version.

== Personnel ==
As listed in liner notes.

- Pete Anderson – electric guitar, acoustic guitar, baritone guitar, producer
- Tom Brumley – steel guitar
- Lenny Castro – percussion
- Chuck Domanico – acoustic bass
- Jeff Donavan – drums
- Skip Edwards – keyboards
- Tommy Funderburk – background vocals
- Scott Joss – fiddle, mandolin
- Jim Lauderdale – background vocals
- Patty Loveless – duet vocals on "Send a Message to My Heart"
- Roger Miller – background vocals
- Tim O'Brien – mandolin, background vocals
- Dean Parks – acoustic guitar
- Al Perkins – banjo, Dobro, steel guitar, lap steel guitar
- Taras Prodaniuk – bass guitar, six-string bass guitar
- Amy Ray – background vocals
- Don Reed – fiddle
- Bill Ross – strings
- Emily Saliers – background vocals
- Dwight Yoakam – lead vocals, acoustic guitar
- Pete Anderson – producer
- Peter Doell – engineer
- Kevin Reeves – engineer
- Dusty Wakeman – engineer
- Lori Fumar – engineer
- Leslie Ann Jones – engineer
- Denny Thomas – engineer
- Armando Garcia – recording assistant
- Steve Kades – recording assistant
- Gary White – recording assistant
- David Leonard – mixing
- Stephen Marcussen – mastering

== Chart positions ==
=== Album ===
| Chart (1990) | Peak position |
|---|---|
| Australian Albums (ARIA) | 147 |
| U.S. Billboard Top Country Albums | 7 |
| U.S. Billboard 200 | 96 |

=== Singles ===
| Year | Single | Chart positions | |
| Year | Single | US Country | CAN Country |
|---|---|---|---|
| 1990 | "Turn It On, Turn It Up, Turn Me Loose" | 11 | 5 |
| 1991 | "You're the One" | 5 | 4 |
| 1991 | "Nothing's Changed Here" | 15 | 2 |
| 1992 | "It Only Hurts When I Cry" | 7 | 4 |
| 1992 | "The Heart That You Own" | 18 | 13 |
| 1992 | "Send a Message to My Heart" (with Patty Loveless) | 47 | 30 |
