= A Long Way Home (album) =

Studio album by Dwight Yoakam
- Released: June 9, 1998
- Genre: Country
- Length: 41:51
- Label: Reprise
- Producer: Pete Anderson

Dwight Yoakam chronology
Come On Christmas (1997)	A Long Way Home (1998)	Last Chance for a Thousand Years: Dwight Yoakam's Greatest Hits from the 90's (1999)

Professional ratings
Review scores
Source	Rating
Allmusic	3/5 stars
The Encyclopedia of Popular Music	4/5 stars
Entertainment Weekly	A−
Rolling Stone	3.5/5 stars

A Long Way Home is the ninth studio album by American country music artist Dwight Yoakam, released on June 9, 1998. It reached No. 11 on the Billboard Country Album, with two of its tracks charting on the Hot Country Singles chart. "Things Change" reached No. 17, while "These Arms" peaked at No. 57. Yoakam wrote all the songs on the album himself.

== Recording and composition ==
Yoakam wrote most of the songs while shooting The Newton Boys with Austin director Richard Linklater. Although the country star's commercial stock fell as his interest in acting grew in the latter half of the Nineties, Yoakam later insisted:

"I wrote some of the best material I’ve ever written while shooting in Austin, Texas. Just out at the Colorado River. [He starts playing the intro to the album opening "Same Fool"]. So, I think I wrote more. Because touring interrupts writing. Writing is stationary; it allows me to ponder and think outside myself. And I’d hope I was getting better at it. A Long Way Home had thirteen songs on it, and they were all mine. First one where I had no covers.

Musically speaking, A Long Way Home is a return to a more palatable country sound compared to some of the ambitious material on Yoakam's previous studio album Gone (1995) and the cover album Under the Covers (1997), which contained rock, pop, soul, and Motown influences. Yoakam later admitted that "...we knew we’d probably taken it as far as it could go. I’m proud of the other things, but...you could feel that the journey was completed." However, the LP's first single, "Things Change," missed the country Top 10, while a second single, "These Arms," bombed completely, stalling at #57. It had far more to do with the country music climate at the time than the quality of the songs. In his book A Thousand Miles from Nowhere, writer Don McClesse notes, "As long as Dwight sold a ton of product, he was worth the trouble, but as soon as he didn’t, he wasn’t. There was more money to be made in country music in the 1990s than ever before, but the music had reverted to the sort of formula that Dwight had resisted from the start." Producer and guitarist Pete Anderson, who was Yoakam's creative partner from 1983 to 2002, told Guitar World in 2012, "Dwight and I sort of blazed our trail and did what we wanted because he had an extraordinary amount of talent. He had great songs, and songs rule the roost no matter what. Dwight could have been the biggest country star possibly of all time if he’d had the marketing skills of Garth Brooks to go with his talent."

Although it produced no Top 10 hits, the atmosphere on A Long Way Home is bright and vibrant with Yoakam wearing some of the influences on his sleeve. Biographer Don McCleese writes, "Though the road of love remains rocky in Yoakam’s material, the arrangements reinforce the lighter touch...The opening steel run of ‘Same Fool’ evokes the ‘Rainy Day Woman’ of Waylon Jennings while the following ‘The Curse’ proceeds at a Johnny Cash lope, and the majestic ‘Things Change’ and the string-laden ‘Yet to Succeed’ rank with definitive Dwight." Yoakam also employs the vocal mannerisms of his hero Buck Owens on "I Wouldn’t Put It Pass Me" and "Same Fool," the latter sounding like a Roger Miller song. "I’ll Just Take These," "A Long Way Home," the novelty "That’s Okay," and the Ray Price shuffle "These Arms" are all straight country. However, "These Arms" contains a trippy bridge that shows Anderson and Yoakam were still open to experimentation within a pure country context. Yoakam also returns to rockabilly with the Elvis pastiche "Maybe You like It, Maybe You Don’t" and the driving "Only Want You More."

Yoakam also recorded "Traveler’s Lantern" as a duet with bluegrass legend Ralph Stanley. The two first worked together on Stanley's 1992 LP Saturday Night & Sunday Morning and again on Yoakam's 1997 covers album performing a radically reworked version of The Clash’s "Train in Vain." The pair’s musical relationship preceded the release of the 2000 film O Brother Where Art Thou?, which would expose Stanley to a wider audience, and collaborate several more times. As the singer explained to Billboard in 2016, "We did one on A Long Way Home titled 'Traveler's Lantern' that Ralph also guested on, which was again a pseudo-bluegrass song. I've always been doing mountain music in the way I write melodically - it's my natural writing inclination." In the coming years Yoakam will record more bluegrass as has become identified with the Americana genre.

== Reception ==
AllMusic: "A Long Way Home doesn't rank with This Time, probably because it is an outgrowth of that leap forward instead of the leap itself, but like Gone, it is a rich, diverse, continually impressive collection of timeless songs."

== Track listing ==
All songs written by Dwight Yoakam.

No.	Title	Length
1.	"Same Fool"	3:03
2.	"The Curse"	2:33
3.	"Things Change"	3:45
4.	"Yet to Succeed"	3:19
5.	"I Wouldn't Put It Past Me"	2:38
6.	"These Arms"	3:31
7.	"That's Okay"	2:26
8.	"Only Want You More"	3:22
9.	"I'll Just Take These"	2:49
10.	"A Long Way Home"	2:55
11.	"Listen"	3:47
12.	"Traveler's Lantern"	3:25
13.	"Maybe You Like It, Maybe You Don't"	4:20

== Personnel ==
- Dwight Yoakam – lead vocals, acoustic guitar
- Beth Andersen – background vocals
- Pete Anderson – hand claps, finger snaps, electric guitar, lap steel guitar, acoustic guitar
- Jim Christie – drums
- Chuck Domanico – upright bass
- Skip Edwards – keyboards, piano, Hammond B-3 organ, Wurlitzer
- Tommy Funderburk – background vocals
- Carl Jackson – background vocals
- Scott Joss – fiddle
- Jim Lauderdale – background vocals
- Dean Parks – acoustic guitar
- Taras Prodaniuk – bass guitar
- Marty Rifkin – Dobro, pedal steel guitar
- Bonnie Bramlett Sheridan – background vocals
- Ralph Stanley – banjo, background vocals
- "Tempo" – percussion

Strings conducted by Murray Adler and conducted by Jimmy Boyd.

== Charts ==
=== Weekly charts ===
Chart (1998)	Peak position
Canadian Albums (RPM)	67
Canadian Country Albums (RPM)	12
US Billboard 200	60
US Top Country Albums (Billboard)	11

=== Year-end charts ===
Chart (1998)	Position
US Top Country Albums (Billboard)	47
