= Working in Tennessee =

Studio album by Merle Haggard
- Released: October 4, 2011
- Genre: Country
- Length: 35:06
- Label: Vanguard
- Producer: Lou Bradley, Merle Haggard

Merle Haggard chronology
I Am What I Am (2010)	Working in Tennessee (2011)	Django & Jimmie (2015)

Singles from Working in Tennessee
- 1. "Working in Tennessee" Released: July 19, 2011

Working in Tennessee is the sixty-third and final solo studio album by American country music artist Merle Haggard. It was released on October 4, 2011 by Vanguard Records. This is also the second Merle Haggard album released by Vanguard.

== Critical reception ==
Professional ratings
Review scores
Source	Rating
AllMusic	3.5/5 stars
Robert Christgau	A−
Spin	6/10 stars

Stephen Thomas Erlewine of Allmusic praised the album, writing "Hag never rushes things, never turns up the volume, his western swing now bearing a closer resemblance to the gentlemanly amiability of Hank Thompson instead of the wild, woolly Bob Wills. He’s proceeding at the pace of a 74-year-old legend with nothing to prove, yet he’s not resting on his laurels, he’s just doing what he’s always done: singing songs so expertly his virtuosity almost goes unnoticed." In his review, music critic Robert Christgau only wrote "Now 74 and short half a lung, he's not making the best music of his life, just the best albums... Man's learned how to live, and he has no intention of stopping." Spin writes of the style, "His greatest skill remains how convincingly he stands in, and stands up, for regular guys, even when he's coasting... Working in Tennessee glides along on its Bakersfield groove with the greatest of ease, despite the album's title."

== Track listing ==
No.	Title	Writer(s)	Length
1.	"Working in Tennessee"	Merle Haggard	2:22
2.	"Down on the Houseboat"	M. Haggard, Theresa Haggard, Doug Colosio	2:52
3.	"Cocaine Blues"	T. J. Arnall	3:18
4.	"What I Hate"	M. Haggard	3:51
5.	"Sometimes I Dream"	M. Haggard, Jenessa Haggard	2:44
6.	"Under the Bridge"	M. Haggard, T. Haggard	3:01
7.	"Too Much Boogie Woogie"	M. Haggard	2:52
8.	"Truck Driver's Blues"	M. Haggard, Tim Howard	2:55
9.	"Laugh It Off"	M. Haggard, T. Haggard, Colosio	3:52
10.	"Working Man Blues" (with Willie Nelson and Ben Haggard)	M. Haggard	4:09
11.	"Jackson" (with Theresa Haggard)	Billy Edd Wheeler, Jerry Leiber	3:10

== Personnel ==
- Merle Haggard – vocals, guitar
- Biff Adam – drums
- Don Markham – saxophone
- Red Lane – guitar
- Willie Nelson – vocals, guitar
- Ben Haggard – vocals, guitar
- Gene Chrisman – drums
- George Receli – drums, percussion
- Doug Colosio – keyboards, piano
- Theresa Haggard – background vocals
- David Hood – bass
- Kevin Williams – bass
- Tim Howard – drums, guitar
- Rob Ickes – Dobro, pedal steel guitar, slide guitar
- Jeff Ingraham – drums
- Scott Joss – banjo, fiddle, guitar, background vocals
- Reggie Young – guitar
- Joe Manuel – dobro
- Bobby Wood – piano

== Chart performance ==
Chart (2011)	Peak position
U.S. Billboard Top Country Albums	30
U.S. Billboard 200	155
U.S. Billboard Independent Albums	25
