= Buenas Noches from a Lonely Room =

Studio album by Dwight Yoakam
- Released: August 2, 1988
- Recorded: Capitol (Hollywood)
- Genre: Country
- Length: 36:38
- Label: Reprise
- Producer: Pete Anderson

Dwight Yoakam chronology
Hillbilly Deluxe (1987)	Buenas Noches from a Lonely Room (1988)	Just Lookin' for a Hit (1989)

Singles from Buenas Noches from a Lonely Room
- 1. "Streets of Bakersfield" Released: June 17, 1988; 2. "I Sang Dixie" Released: October 1988; 3. "I Got You" Released: February 1989; 4. "Buenas Noches from a Lonely Room (She Wore Red Dresses)" Released: June 1989

Professional ratings
Review scores
Source	Rating
Allmusic	link

Buenas Noches from a Lonely Room is the third studio album by American country music singer Dwight Yoakam, released on August 2, 1988. The album contains Yoakam's first two No. 1 Hot Country Singles singles. The first was "Streets of Bakersfield," a duet with country music veteran Buck Owens, who had originally released a version of the song in 1973. The second was an original composition of Yoakam's titled "I Sang Dixie." A third song on the album, "I Got You," also an original composition, peaked at No. 5. The title song, "Buenas Noches from a Lonely Room (She Wore Red Dresses)," also charted, but only to the No. 46 position.

== Background ==
Yoakam's first two Reprise albums, 1986's Guitars, Cadillacs, Etc., Etc. and 1987's Hillbilly Deluxe, both hit #1 on the Billboard country albums chart and established him as one of the hottest stars in what was being referred to as the "New Traditionalist" movement, a shift away from the slick productions of Nashville to a more roots-based sound. Like Willie Nelson and his hero Buck Owens, Yoakam honed his craft and developed a following away from the Nashville – in his case by playing rock and punk clubs in and around Los Angeles – and his sniping at Music City in the media did not endear him to industry insiders and even some fellow musicians, such as Nashville veteran Steve Earle, who was enjoying his first taste of success around the same time. Earle later stated, "We butted heads a little bit, which was turned into this feud by some people, but there was never any personal animosity between us…He pushed my buttons that way, and I resented it. Nowadays, I sort of wonder what I was defending, because I defended that town right up to the time I left. And I don’t really anymore." Yoakam rubbed some critics the wrong way as well, with a writer from the Village Voice allowing that "he has an obnoxious, ass-twitching stage presence. Yet everything he does is hyper-calculated…all part of the pose." But Yoakam, who was born in Kentucky, composed much of his own material, and songs like "Miner’s Prayer" and "Readin’, Rightin’, Rt. 23" clearly showed a profound love and appreciation for his southern roots, and he achieved commercial success largely on his own terms.

== Recording ==
Buenas Noches was produced by guitarist Pete Anderson, Yoakam's creative partner since meeting in Los Angeles. Armed with a Telecaster, Anderson provided some fiery treble to Yoakam's songs in much the same way that guitarist Don Rich did for Buck Owens, and along with Yoakam's nasal, high lonesome voice, created a unique sound rooted in the Bakersfield honky-tonk scene from the fifties. However, for this album the pair introduced a Tex-Mex sound by employing accordion kingpin Flaco Jimenez, who previously worked with artists like Ry Cooder and Doug Sahm. This album would also see a personnel shift in Yoakam's backing band, the Babylonian Cowboys, with bassist J.D. Foster and fiddler Brantley Kearns leaving and new bassist Taras Prodaniuk, mandolinist Scott Joss, and keyboardist Skip Edwards joining.

== Composition ==
=== "Streets of Bakersfield" and "I Sang Dixie" ===
The album is best remembered for containing Yoakam's first two number one hit singles, "Streets of Bakersfield" and "I Sang Dixie." The former song was written by Homer Joy, who was approached in 1972 by representatives from Buck Owens' studio in Bakersfield, California, about recording a "Hank Williams Sr. soundalike-album". Joy initially refused, saying "I don't want to be like Hank, I just want to be me!" Eventually, he agreed to come in and record it, on the condition that he would also get to record some of his own songs as well. After the recording, however, the studio manager told Joy that he'd forgotten that the Buckaroos (Buck Owens' band) were practicing for an upcoming tour, and that Joy would have to wait to record his original songs. Refusing to back down, Joy would show up at the studio at 8:00 every morning, only to be told that the Buckaroos were busy and that he would still have to wait. One night, Joy decided to take a walk around downtown Bakersfield, only to have the brand-new cowboy boots he'd been wearing give him blisters all over his feet: "[I] barely made it back to the car, and on top of that, I was still upset about everything, and I went back to my hotel room and wrote "Streets of Bakersfield"". Owens liked the song and released a recording of it in 1973 on his album Ain’t It Amazing, Gracie, and while that version was not a major hit, the re-recording he did with Dwight Yoakam in 1988 (with slightly changed lyrics) reached number 1 on the Billboard Country Music charts.

The song was perfect for Yoakam, who, like Owens, endured criticism for saying what was on his mind, with lines like "I just want a chance to be myself" reflecting his vision of artistic independence and individualism. Owens, who was probably best known at the time for starring on Hee-Haw despite being one of the most successful country artists of the 1960s, was semi-retired until Yoakam cajoled him into recording the song as a duet. The pairing proved so successful that Owens went on tour as Yoakam's special guest, where he received a regal welcome from a generation of fans who knew him only as a legend, while reinforcing a passing-of-the-torch claim to Yoakam's honky-tonk ascendance. Owens also appeared in the music video.

The album's other number one single, "I Sang Dixie," was originally demoed in 1981. ("Floyd County" was also recorded during these demo sessions.) Anderson later commented, "’I Sang Dixie’ I'd always set a little aside, because I thought it was his best song. And I didn't want to put it on the first or even second album, because I thought this is a number one record. And you've got to beat the doors down with the other material so that they're ready to listen to you." Rolling Stone ranked "I Sang Dixie" No. 26 on its list of the 40 Saddest Country Songs of All time in 2019. The song's narrator describes meeting a man from the Southern United States dying on a street in Los Angeles. The narrator, while crying, holds the man and sings 'Dixie' to comfort him as he dies. He goes on to describe how others "walk on by" ignoring the man's suffering. The dying man warns the narrator with his final words to "run back home to that southern land" and escape "what life here has done to me". The song was released as a single in October 1988 and rose to the top of the charts the following year.

=== Concept ===
As noted by Yoakam biographer Don McLeese, the subject matter on Buenas Noches "is almost relentlessly bleak, occasionally lethal, a descent into the depths of honky-tonk hell." Side one of the original LP contains five songs that tell a paranoid tale of adultery and murder execution-style, although producer later Pete Anderson insisted to McLeese:

Dwight went into the third album and, in his mind, he made a theme record. I don’t know if some of it’s thematic, but you don’t really care what someone’s motivation is. Five or six of those songs had been written for quite a while. And he slid in "She Wore Red Dresses" and a couple of other things that made it a thematic record – in his mind. I just looked at it as a collection of really good songs that worked together.

AllMusic critic Thom Jurek writes, "Not since Leon Payne has anyone gone from love that is so obsessive it cares not a whit for the most basic of life's needs…to a murderous jealousy…to homicide in the first five songs. Side one begins with "I Got You," which was released in February 1989 as the album's third single, peaking at #5. With lines like, "I got a letter from the folks over at Bell, just to let me know for my next phone call I could walk outside and yell," the song is practically the album's only source for wry humor, detailing the troubles of a narrator trying to make ends meet while taking solace in the fact that he has the woman he loves "to ease my pains" and "keep me sane." This rosy outlook is shattered with the gentle waltz "One More Name’ as the narrator hears the woman uttering names in her sleep – presumably the names of her lovers. Now paranoia carries over into the drum-heavy "What I Don’t Know," which contains the near psychotic warning "What I don’t know might not hurt me, but what I don’t know might get you killed." A cover of Johnny Cash’s "Home of the Blues" comes next and finds the narrator alone in a house "filled with the sweetest memories, memories so sweet that I cry." The story culminates with "She Wore Red Dresses," a murder ballad that finds the narrator "like a madman" praying for vengeance before tracking down the woman and her lover and shooting her in the head. Perhaps due to the song's dark subject matter, the single failed to make the country Top 40.

Side two maintains the album's thematic grimness and melancholy. The cover of Lazy Lester's "I Hear You Knockin’" might sound comparatively cheery, but its lyrics reinforce the emotional bleakness, while Yoakam's interpretation of the Hank Locklin classic "Send Me the Pillow" is full of longing and heartache. (Maria McKee, who sang "Bury Me" with Yoakam on his debut LP, provides background vocals on the song.) "Floyd County" chronicles the death of a man who was a pillar in the community. Even the closing number "Hold On to God," a gospel song written for his mother Ruth Ann, sounds more like a declaration of forbearance rather than a celebration of faith. Yoakam later quipped of the song cycle, "I get moody. I kill someone. Then I get religion in the end. This record’s more me – there are expressions of me that people have never heard before."

== Reception ==
AllMusic: "As chapter three in the Dwight Yoakam restoration of honky tonk music project, this is the best yet." The album was included in the book 1001 Albums You Must Hear Before You Die.

== Track listing ==
No.	Title	Writer(s)	Length
1.	"I Got You"	Dwight Yoakam	3:28
2.	"One More Name"	Yoakam	3:05
3.	"What I Don't Know"	Yoakam	3:46
4.	"Home of the Blues"	Johnny Cash, Glenn Douglas, Lillie McAlpine	2:52
5.	"Buenas Noches from a Lonely Room (She Wore Red Dresses)"	Yoakam	4:31
6.	"I Hear You Knockin'"	J. D. Miller	3:12
7.	"I Sang Dixie"	Yoakam	3:47
8.	"Streets of Bakersfield" (duet with Buck Owens)	Homer Joy	2:48
9.	"Floyd County"	Yoakam	2:55
10.	"Send Me the Pillow"	Hank Locklin	3:00
11.	"Hold On to God"	Yoakam	3:14
Total length:			36:38

== Personnel ==
- Dwight Yoakam – lead vocals, acoustic guitar, percussion
- Pete Anderson – acoustic guitar, electric guitar, six-string bass guitar, background vocals, percussion; mandolin on "Send Me the Pillow"
- Tom Brumley – pedal steel guitar
- Al Perkins – Dobro
- Taras Prodaniuk – bass guitar
- Dusty Wakeman – six-string bass guitar ("Hold On to God"), percussion
- Jeff Donavan – drums
- Don Reed – fiddle
- Skip Edwards – piano
- Scott Joss – mandolin
- Flaco Jiménez – accordion
- Maria McKee – background vocals on "Send Me the Pillow"
- Buck Owens – duet vocals on "Streets of Bakersfield"
- The Lonesome Strangers (Jeff Rymes and Randy Weeks) – background vocals on "Hold On to God"
- Jim Lauderdale – background vocals
- Brantley Kearns – background vocals on "What I Don't Know"

== Chart performance ==
=== Album ===
Chart (1988)	Peak position
U.S. Billboard Top Country Albums	1
U.S. Billboard 200	68
Canadian RPM Country Albums	17
Canadian Albums Chart	47
RIANZ New Zealand Albums Chart	37
Swedish Albums Chart	37

=== Singles ===
Year	Single	Chart positions	
Year	Single	US Country	CAN Country
1988	"Streets of Bakersfield" (with Buck Owens)	1	*
1988	"I Sang Dixie"	1	*
1989	"I Got You"	5	5
1989	"Buenas Noches from a Lonely Room (She Wore Red Dresses)"	46	52
* denotes unknown peak positions

== Legacy ==
The album was one of Rolling Stones' highest rated albums of 1988, at number 14. The album was also included in the book 1001 Albums You Must Hear Before You Die. Writing in 2014, the alternative weekly Nashville Scene said the album "established him (Yoakam) as a master of persona, as well as an ingenious record-maker and self-deprecating songwriter."
