= Gone (Dwight Yoakam album) =

Studio album by Dwight Yoakam
- Released: October 31, 1995
- Studio: Capitol (Hollywood)
- Genre: Country; honky tonk
- Length: 35:03
- Label: Reprise
- Producer: Pete Anderson

Dwight Yoakam chronology
Dwight Live (1995)	Gone (1995)	Under the Covers (1997)

Singles from Gone
- 1. "Nothing" Released: October 14, 1995; 2. "Gone (That'll Be Me)" Released: January 1996; 3. "Sorry You Asked?" Released: April 1996; 4. "Heart of Stone" Released: June 1996

Gone is the sixth studio album by American country music artist Dwight Yoakam, released on October 31, 1995, by Reprise Records. The album peaked at #5 on the Billboard Country Albums chart. It produced three singles on the Billboard Hot Country Songs charts: "Nothing" at #20, "Gone (That'll Be Me)" at #51, and "Sorry You Asked?" at #59. The final single, "Heart of Stone", failed to chart in the United States. This was also the first album of his career not to produce a Top Ten country hit.

== Background ==
All of Yoakam's first three albums hit #1 on the country albums chart and, after the transitional If There Was a Way in 1990, he scored the biggest album of his career with 1993's This Time, which went triple platinum and spawned three Top 5 singles, including the #2 single "Fast as You", which also made Billboard's Hot 100. This commercial momentum came to an abrupt halt with the release of Gone, which precipitated the singer's decline as a hit making country artist. Yoakam's longtime producer and guitarist Pete Anderson lays the blame at the feet of Warner Bros. Nashville for its lack of promotion, later commenting, "We went from a triple platinum record to a record that sold three hundred and fifty thousand copies... What does that tell you? It tells me people didn't even know the record was out."

Others contend that Gone went further from his country roots than some listeners, and country radio, were willing to go, with AllMusic's Thom Jurek warning "...it's true that those who long for Yoakam's purely honky-tonk style may be lost a bit here..." In addition, Yoakam was becoming more involved in acting, appearing in 1993's Red Rock West and Billy Bob Thornton's 1996 vehicle Sling Blade. Biographer Don McLeese wrote, "...the more time (and, eventually, money) Dwight invested in a film career, the less he would think of himself as exclusively as a musical artist, particularly as it became apparent that he wasn't likely to enjoy the consistent commercial success post-Gone that he had from the start of his recording career." Although Gone is remembered fondly by all those involved – Pete Anderson calls it "a beautiful, beautiful record" – Yoakam has not had a Top 10 country single since its release.

== Recording and composition ==
Dusty Wakeman, Gone's executive producer, later admitted experimentation was the order of the day during the sessions, telling one writer, "Gone was totally like, 'Let's go crazy,' and I knew that going in." Yoakam also composed the tunes on an electric guitar, which was a new development and may account for the jangly Byrds-type quality of songs like "Near You." That song being one of two cuts to feature The Rembrandts on background vocals. The mariachi-driven opener "Sorry You Asked?" and Texas spoof "Baby Why Not" removed some of the dark lyrical subject matter found on previous albums, while "Never Hold You" is a flat out rocker in the vein of Tom Petty, without any traces of the rockabilly that usually tinged Yoakam's heavier material. "One More Night" features soul singers, brass, and Anderson even employing a sitar in the finale, while the album's lead single "Nothing", written with songwriting collaborator Kostas, aimed for a more soulful sound.

Yoakam later said, "That album had this splitting up of our musical atom, so to speak, with Pete controlling the engineering, and then me throwing paint over my shoulder at times." As one critic put it, "It's the record Dwight had to make, and it's one that his Nashville label had no idea how to sell, no luck in selling, or no interest in selling."

Despite its eclectic parts, Gone contains material akin with Yoakam's musical roots, such as the Ray Price shuffle "Don't Be Sad" and the pulsating title track, which, despite its radio-friendly appeal, stiffed as a single, peaking at #51. With its sweeping orchestral introduction, "Heart of Stone" is a pure country single in the vein of Patsy Cline that failed to chart.

== Reception ==
Professional ratings
Review scores
Source	Rating
AllMusic	4/5 stars

Although Gone's release generated extensive media interest in Yoakam, its commercial success paled in comparison to his previous album This Time. AllMusic reviewer Thom Jurek stated, "Gone is the work of a singular talent with input from many different sources, from instrumentalists and horn and string sections to a dozen backing vocalists all used on different tracks."

== Track listing ==
All tracks written by Dwight Yoakam; "Nothing" and "Heart of Stone" co-written by Kostas.

No.	Title	Length
1.	"Sorry You Asked?"	3:25
2.	"Near You"	3:04
3.	"Don't Be Sad"	3:19
4.	"Gone (That'll Be Me)"	2:50
5.	"Nothing"	3:55
6.	"Never Hold You"	2:55
7.	"This Much I Know"	3:38
8.	"Baby Why Not"	3:08
9.	"One More Night"	4:41
10.	"Heart of Stone"	4:08
Total length:		35:03

== Personnel ==
- Murray Adler – string contractor
- Beth Anderson – background vocals (5, 7, 9)
- Maxi Anderson – background vocals (5, 9)
- Pete Anderson – electric guitar, electric sitar, harmonica, hand claps
- John Batdorf – background vocals (10)
- James E. Bond, Jr. – string arranger & conductor
- Tom Brumley – lap steel guitar, pedal steel guitar
- Jim Christie – drums
- Anthony Crawford – background vocals (4)
- Skip Edwards – keyboards, organ, piano, accordion
- Tommy Funderburk – background vocals (5, 6, 9, 10)
- Jim Haas – background vocals (10)
- Carl Jackson – background vocals (1, 4)
- Scott Joss – fiddle
- Jim Lauderdale – background vocals (3, 10)
- Steve "Gonna Get a RIV" Moore – hand claps
- Dean Parks – acoustic guitar
- Lon Price – tenor saxophone
- Taras Prodaniuk – bass guitar
- The Rembrandts (Phillip Solem and Danny Wilde) – background vocals (2, 6)
- Greg Smith – baritone saxophone
- "Tempo" – percussion
- Lee Thornburg – horn arrangements
- Carmen Twillie – background vocals (5, 9)
- Dusty Wakeman – six–string bass guitar, hand claps
- Gary "Double Dub" White – hand claps
- Joy Lynn White – background vocals (8)
- Danny Wilde – background vocals
- Dwight Yoakam – lead vocals, background vocals, acoustic guitar, electric guitar, hand claps

== Chart performance ==
=== Album ===
Chart performance for Gone
Chart (1995–1996)	Peak position
Australian Albums (ARIA)	17
Canadian Albums Chart	42
Canadian RPM Country Albums	5
US Billboard 200	30
US Top Country Albums (Billboard)	5

=== Singles ===
Year	Single	Chart positions	
Year	Single	US Country	CAN Country
1995	"Nothing"	20	20
1996	"Gone (That'll Be Me)"	51	43
1996	"Sorry You Asked?"	59	73
1996	"Heart of Stone"	—	90
"—" denotes releases that did not chart
