= I Got You (Dwight Yoakam song) =

Single by Dwight Yoakam

from the album Buenas Noches from a Lonely Room
- B-side: "South Of Cincinnati"
- Released: February 1989
- Recorded: 1988
- Genre: Country
- Length: 3:28
- Label: Reprise 27567
- Songwriter: Dwight Yoakam
- Producer: Pete Anderson

Dwight Yoakam singles chronology
"I Sang Dixie" (1988)	"I Got You" (1989)	"Buenas Noches from a Lonely Room (She Wore Red Dresses)" (1989)

"I Got You" is a song written and recorded by American country music artist Dwight Yoakam. It was released in February 1989 as the third single from his album Buenas Noches from a Lonely Room. It peaked at #5 in both the United States and Canada.

== Chart performance ==
Chart (1989)	Peak position
Canada Country Singles (RPM)	5
US Hot Country Songs (Billboard)	5

=== Year-end charts ===
Chart (1989)	Position
US Country Songs (Billboard)	75
