= Under the Covers (Dwight Yoakam album) =

Studio album by Dwight Yoakam
- Released: July 15, 1997
- Genre: Country
- Length: 36:48
- Label: Reprise
- Producer: Pete Anderson

Dwight Yoakam chronology
Gone (1995)	Under the Covers (1997)	Come on Christmas (1997)

Professional ratings
Review scores
Source	Rating
AllMusic	3/5 stars

Under the Covers is the seventh studio album, released on July 15, 1997, and the first covers album recorded by Dwight Yoakam. It peaked at No. 8 on Billboard's Top Country Albums chart, and No. 92 on the Billboard 200.

== Background ==
As he had on the commercially disappointing Gone two years before, Yoakam continued to challenge expectations with a mixed bag of covers, including songs by The Clash, The Kinks, The Beatles, and the Rolling Stones that betrayed the singer’s affection for British rock. Two songs, "Here Comes the Night" and "Things We Said Today", were previously recorded for the 1992 compilation album La Croix d'Amour. Various cuts, such as Roy Orbison’s "Claudette" and the Wynn Stewart hit "Playboy," fit him like a glove, with producer/guitarist Pete Anderson supplying arrangements that work to Yoakam’s strengths, but the Vegas lounge take of The Kinks' "Tired of Waiting for You" likely baffled listeners, with Yoakam biographer Don McCleese deeming it "a Rat Pack/Vegas miscalculation. According to Anderson, Yoakam was inspired by Louis Prima on the number. Yoakam also cut Sonny & Cher’s "Baby Don't Go" as a duet with Sheryl Crow. AllMusic’s Thom Jurek contends that track "doesn’t really work either, because Crow is not a country singer and there's enough countrypolitan in Yoakam's read that the two singers seem cold and at odds with each other." Amazingly, considering how hot the radio-friendly Crow was in the Nineties, the single did not chart, although Yoakam’s reportedly sour relationship with his label Reprise may have been a factor in it not getting pushed. ("Claudette," the LP’s first single, only made it to number 47.) Far more successful was the radically reworked "Train in Vain," originally recorded by The Clash but given full-on bluegrass treatment here with Ralph Stanley singing background vocals.

== Reception ==
Writer Don McCleese deems the recording "strange, even by the standards set by Gone." AllMusic: "While this set is not perfect, it's still damn fine and warrants repeated listens to come to grips with Yoakam's visionary ambition."

== Track listing ==
1. "Claudette" (Roy Orbison) - 2:59
2. "Train in Vain" (Mick Jones, Joe Strummer) - 3:23
3. "Tired of Waiting for You" (Ray Davies) - 2:59
4. "Good Time Charlie's Got the Blues" (Danny O'Keefe) - 3:17
5. "Baby Don't Go" (Duet with Sheryl Crow) (Sonny Bono) - 4:01
6. "Playboy" (Eddie Miller, Bob Morris) - 2:23
7. "Wichita Lineman" (Jimmy Webb) - 2:54
8. "Here Comes the Night" (Bert Berns) - 3:20
9. "The Last Time" (Mick Jagger, Keith Richards) - 3:58
10. "Things We Said Today" (John Lennon, Paul McCartney) - 3:51
11. "North to Alaska" (Mike Phillips) - 9:13
  - "T For Texas" (Jimmie Rodgers) (Hidden Track)

== Personnel ==
- Dwight Yoakam – lead vocals, guitar, percussion
- Alex Acuña – percussion
- Beth Andersen – background vocals
- Pete Anderson – guitar, 6-string bass, mandolin, background vocals
- Tom Brumley – pedal steel guitar, lap steel guitar
- Jim Christie – drums
- Anthony Crawford – background vocals
- Sheryl Crow – duet, background vocals on "Baby Don't Go"
- Chuck Domanico – upright bass
- Skip Edwards – piano, organ, accordion, keyboards
- Ralph Forbes – drum programming
- Tommy Funderburk – background vocals
- Eric Jorgensen – trombone
- Scott Joss – fiddle, mandolin
- Nick Lane – trombone
- Lonesome Strangers – background vocals
- Dean Parks – guitar
- Lon Price – saxophone
- Taras Prodaniuk – bass, upright bass
- Jeff Rymes – background vocals
- Greg Smith – saxophone
- Ralph Stanley – banjo, vocals
- Chris Tedesco – trumpet
- Lee Thornburg – trumpet
- Randy Weeks – background vocals

== Chart performance ==
=== Album ===
Chart performance for Under the Covers
Chart (1997)	Peak position
Australian Albums (ARIA)	74
Canadian Albums Chart	84
Canadian RPM Country Albums	8
US Billboard 200	92
US Top Country Albums (Billboard)	8

=== Singles ===
Chart performance for singles from Under the Covers
Year	Single	Chart positions	
Year	Single	US Country	CAN Country
1997	"Claudette"	47	44
1997	"Baby Don't Go" (with Sheryl Crow)	—	—
"—" denotes releases that did not chart
