= Turn It On, Turn It Up, Turn Me Loose =

1990 single by Dwight Yoakam

Single by Dwight Yoakam

from the album If There Was a Way
- B-side: "Since I Started Drinkin' Again"
- Released: September 26, 1990
- Recorded: 1990
- Genre: Country
- Length: 3:23
- Label: Reprise
- Songwriters: Kostas, Wayland Patton
- Producer: Pete Anderson

Dwight Yoakam singles chronology
| "Long White Cadillac" (1989) | "Turn It On, Turn It Up, Turn Me Loose" (1990) | "You're the One" (1991) |

"Turn It On, Turn It Up, Turn Me Loose" is a song written by Kostas and Wayland Patton, and recorded by American country music artist Dwight Yoakam. It was released in September 1990 as the lead-off single from his album If There Was a Way. It peaked at #11 in the United States, and #5 in Canada.

== Content ==
The narrator has lost a former lover, and her memory won't leave his mind, so he requests that the music be turned on with the volume up as it will help him forget her.

== Music video ==
The music video was directed by Steve Vaughan.

== Chart performance ==
| Chart (1990–1991) | Peak position |
|---|---|
| Canada Country Singles (RPM) | 5 |
| US Hot Country Songs (Billboard) | 11 |

=== Year-end charts ===
| Chart (1991) | Position |
|---|---|
| Canada Country Tracks (RPM) | 83 |
