= Little Ways =

Single by Dwight Yoakam

from the album Hillbilly Deluxe
- B-side: "Readin', Rightin', Rt.23"
- Released: June 1987
- Genre: Country
- Length: 3:18
- Label: Reprise 28310
- Songwriter(s): Dwight Yoakam
- Producer(s): Pete Anderson

Dwight Yoakam singles chronology
"Little Sister" (1987)	"Little Ways" (1987)	"Please, Please Baby" (1987)

"Little Ways" is a song written and recorded by American country music artist Dwight Yoakam. It was released in June 1987 as the second single from his album Hillbilly Deluxe. It peaked at number 8 on the Billboard Hot Country Songs chart and reached number 1 on the Canadian RPM country singles chart. This song was reprised by Dwight on his live album, Dwight Live and on the acoustic album dwightyoakamacoustic.net.

== Chart performance ==
Chart (1987)	Peak position
US Hot Country Songs (Billboard)	8
Canadian RPM Country Tracks	1
