= Come On Christmas =

Studio album by Dwight Yoakam
- Released: August 26, 1997
- Genre: Country
- Length: 33:09
- Label: Reprise
- Producer: Pete Anderson

Dwight Yoakam chronology
Under the Covers (1997)	Come On Christmas (1997)	A Long Way Home (1998)

Professional ratings
Review scores
Source	Rating
Allmusic	link

Come On Christmas is the eighth studio album, and the first Christmas album by Dwight Yoakam released in 1997 on Reprise Records. It peaked at No. 32 on Billboard's Top Country Albums chart.

== Track listing ==
1. "Come On Christmas" (Dwight Yoakam) - 3:24
2. "Run Run Rudolph" (Marvin Brodie, Johnny Marks) - 3:10
3. "Silver Bells" (Ray Evans, Jay Livingston) - 2:59
  - duet with Beth Andersen
4. "I'll Be Home for Christmas" (Kim Gannon, Walter Kent, Buck Ram) - 3:50
5. "Silent Night" (Franz Gruber, Josef Mohr) - 4:15
6. "Santa Claus Is Back in Town" (Jerry Leiber, Mike Stoller) - 2:40
7. "The Christmas Song" (Mel Tormé, Robert Wells) - 3:48
8. "Away in a Manger" (Public domain) - 3:20
9. "Here Comes Santa Claus" (Gene Autry, Oakley Haldeman) - 2:33
10. "Santa Can't Stay" (Yoakam) - 3:28

== Personnel ==
- Beth Anderson - duet vocals on "Silver Bells"
- Pete Anderson - acoustic guitar, electric guitar
- Jim Christie - drums
- Davey Crockett - drums
- Skip Edwards - accordion, keyboards, organ, piano
- Tommy Funderburk - background vocals
- Scott Joss - fiddle, mandolin
- Brantley Kearns - fiddle
- Jim Lauderdale - background vocals
- John Pierce - bass
- Taras Prodaniuk - bass
- Marty Rifkin - dobro
- Eddy Shaver - electric guitar
- Ricky Skaggs - background vocals
- Beverly Dahlke-Smith - clarinet, flute, tenor saxophone
- Greg Smith - alto saxophone, baritone saxophone
- Lee Thornburg - horn arrangements, trombone, trumpet
- Dwight Yoakam - autoharp, acoustic guitar, electric guitar, lead vocals

== Chart performance ==
=== Album ===
Chart (1997)	Peak position
U.S. Billboard Top Country Albums	32

=== Singles ===
Year	Single	Chart positions
Year	Single	US Country
1997	"Santa Claus Is Back in Town"	60
