= You're the One (Dwight Yoakam song) =

Single by Dwight Yoakam

from the album If There Was a Way
- B-side: "If There Was a Way"
- Released: February 1991
- Recorded: 1990
- Genre: Country
- Length: 3:59
- Label: Reprise 19405
- Songwriter: Dwight Yoakam
- Producer: Pete Anderson

Dwight Yoakam singles chronology
"Turn It On, Turn It Up, Turn Me Loose" (1990)	"You're the One" (1991)	"Nothing's Changed Here" (1991)

"You're the One" is a song written and recorded by American country music artist Dwight Yoakam. It was released in February 1991 as the second single from his album If There Was a Way. It peaked at #5 in the United States, and #4 in Canada.

== Content ==
The song's narrator describes about how his former lover treated him, and now she's been treated the same way that she treated him.

== Music video ==
The music video was directed by Jim Gable.

== Demo version ==
Yoakam initially recorded a demo of the song in 1981, 9 years before its inclusion on If There Was a Way. It is included on both the 2002 boxed set Reprise Please, Baby, and the 2006 reissue of his debut album, Guitars, Cadillacs, Etc., Etc.

== Chart performance ==
Chart (1991)	Peak position
Canada Country Singles (RPM)	4
US Hot Country Songs (Billboard)	5

=== Year-end charts ===
Chart (1991)	Position
Canada Country Tracks (RPM)	23
US Country Songs (Billboard)	53
