= Nothing (Dwight Yoakam song) =

Single by Dwight Yoakam

from the album Gone
- Released: October 14, 1995
- Genre: Country
- Length: 3:54
- Label: Reprise
- Songwriters: Dwight Yoakam, Kostas
- Producer: Pete Anderson

Dwight Yoakam singles chronology
"Pocket of a Clown" (1994)	"Nothing" (1995)	"Gone (That'll Be Me)" (1996)

"Nothing" is a song co-written and recorded by American country music artist Dwight Yoakam. It was released in October 1995 as the first single from the album Gone. The song reached #20 on the Billboard Hot Country Singles & Tracks chart. The song was written by Yoakam and Kostas.

== Chart performance ==
Chart (1995)	Peak position
Canada Country Singles (RPM)	20
US Hot Country Songs (Billboard)	20
