= Things Change (song) =

Single by Dwight Yoakam

from the album A Long Way Home
- Released: May 27, 1998
- Genre: Country
- Length: 3:45
- Label: Reprise
- Songwriter: Dwight Yoakam
- Producer: Pete Anderson

Dwight Yoakam singles chronology
"Baby Don't Go" (1997)	"Things Change" (1998)	"These Arms" (1998)

"Things Change" is a song written and recorded by American country music artist Dwight Yoakam. It was released in May 1998 as the first single from his album A Long Way Home. The song reached number 17 on the Billboard Hot Country Singles & Tracks chart in July 1998.

== Critical reception ==
Deborah Evans Price of Billboard gave the song a favorable review, saying that it is "a well-written treatise on the mercurial nature of relationships - nicely set against a backdrop of tasty guitar riffs."

== Music video ==
The music video was directed by Yoakam and premiered in May 1998.

== Chart performance ==
Chart (1998)	Peak position
Canada Country Singles (RPM)	23
US Hot Country Songs (Billboard)	17
