= The Heart That You Own =

Single by Dwight Yoakam

from the album If There Was a Way
- Released: April 20, 1992
- Genre: Country
- Length: 3:08
- Label: Reprise
- Songwriter: Dwight Yoakam
- Producer: Pete Anderson

Dwight Yoakam singles chronology
"It Only Hurts When I Cry" (1991)	"The Heart That You Own" (1992)	"Send a Message to My Heart" (1992)

"The Heart That You Own" is a song written and recorded by American country music artist Dwight Yoakam. It was released in April 1992 as the fifth single from his album If There Was a Way. This song peaked at number 18 in the United States and at number 13 in Canada.

== Music video ==
The music video was directed by Neil Abramson and premiered in early 1992.

== Chart performance ==
"The Heart That You Own" debuted the U.S. Billboard Hot Country Singles & Tracks for the week of April 25, 1992.

Chart (1992)	Peak position
Canada Country Singles (RPM)	13
US Hot Country Songs (Billboard)	18
