= Please, Please Baby =

Single by Dwight Yoakam

from the album Hillbilly Deluxe
- B-side: "Throughout All Time"
- Released: November 2, 1987
- Genre: Country
- Length: 3:36
- Label: Reprise 28174
- Songwriter(s): Dwight Yoakam
- Producer(s): Pete Anderson

Dwight Yoakam singles chronology
"Little Ways" (1987)	"Please, Please Baby" (1987)	"Always Late with Your Kisses" (1988)

"Please, Please Baby" is a song written and recorded by American country music artist Dwight Yoakam. It was released in November 1987 as the third single from his album Hillbilly Deluxe. It peaked at number 6 on the Billboard Hot Country Songs chart and number 2 on the Canadian RPM country singles chart. This song was reprised by Dwight on his live album, Dwight Live and on the acoustic album dwightyoakamacoustic.net.

== Music video ==
The live performance music video, taken from the 1995 album Dwight Live, was directed by Bud Schaetzle, and premiered in mid-1995.

== Chart performance ==
Chart (1987–1988)	Peak position
US Hot Country Songs (Billboard)	6
Canadian RPM Country Tracks	2

=== Year-end charts ===
Chart (1988)	Position
Canadian RPM Country Tracks	29
