= Crazy Little Thing Called Love =

1979 single by Queen

Single by Queen

from the album The Game
- B-side: "We Will Rock You" (live) (UK); "Spread Your Wings" (live) (US)
- Released: 12 October 1979 (UK); 7 December 1979 (US)
- Recorded: June–July 1979
- Studio: Musicland (Munich, Germany)
- Genre: Rock and roll; rockabilly
- Length: 2:55
- Label: EMI (UK); Elektra (US)
- Songwriter: Freddie Mercury
- Producer: Queen

Queen UK singles chronology
"Love of My Life (Live at Festhalle Frankfurt, 2 Feb '79)" (1979)	"Crazy Little Thing Called Love" (1979)	"Save Me" (1980)

Queen US singles chronology
"We Will Rock You (Live at Lyon, 17 Feb '79)" (1979)	"Crazy Little Thing Called Love" (1979)	"Play the Game" (1980)

Audio sample
- file; help

Music video
- "Crazy Little Thing Called Love" on YouTube

"Crazy Little Thing Called Love" is a song by the British rock band Queen. Written by Freddie Mercury in 1979, the track appears on their 1980 album The Game. It reached number two in the UK singles chart in late 1979, before becoming the group's first number-one single on the US Billboard Hot 100 in early 1980, where it remained for four consecutive weeks. The song was Queen's final single release of the 1970s and was later included on their 1981 compilation album Greatest Hits.

Having composed "Crazy Little Thing Called Love" on guitar, Mercury played rhythm guitar while performing the song live between 1979 and 1986, marking the second instrument he played onstage with Queen besides the piano. Official live recordings of the song appear on Queen Rock Montreal, Queen on Fire – Live at the Bowl, Live Aid, Live at Wembley '86, and Hungarian Rhapsody: Queen Live in Budapest. The song was also performed at The Freddie Mercury Tribute Concert on 20 April 1992, with Robert Plant joining Queen on vocals. Since then, it has been covered by a number of artists, most notably Dwight Yoakam, whose version peaked at number 12 on the US country singles charts in 1999.

== Composition ==
Crazy Little Thing Called Love was written by Mercury as a tribute to his musical heroes Elvis Presley and Cliff Richard. In a Melody Maker interview dated 2 May 1981, Mercury stated that he composed "Crazy Little Thing Called Love" on guitar in just five to ten minutes.

'Crazy Little Thing Called Love' took me five or ten minutes. I did that on the guitar, which I can't play for nuts, and in one way it was quite a good thing because I was restricted, knowing only a few chords. It's a good discipline because I simply had to write within a small framework. I couldn't work through too many chords and because of that restriction I wrote a good song, I think.

— Freddie Mercury

According to Roger Taylor, Mercury quickly completed the song's lyrics while relaxing in a bath at the Hotel Bayerischer Hof in Munich and presented them shortly afterward to him and John Deacon. The three members, along with their then-new producer Reinhold Mack, recorded it at Musicland Studios, where Queen held sessions for their next album. The song was reportedly completed in under half an hour, although Mack later recalled that the session took six hours.

May's guitar solo was dubbed in. He aimed to emulate longtime Ricky Nelson and Presley guitarist James Burton, and, at Mack's suggestion, used a Fender Esquire rather than his regular Red Special to achieve this effect.

== Critical reception ==
"Crazy Little Thing Called Love" received acclaim from contemporary music critics. Cashbox described it as a "hip shakin' rockabilly romp" and an "upbeat tune", while Record World said that the band "does a superb job of capturing the spirit and sound of the late '50s be-bop rock'n'roll". Billboard praised May's guitar playing, calling it "stunning in its simplicity".

== Chart performance ==
In the United Kingdom, "Crazy Little Thing Called Love" entered the UK singles chart on 20 October 1979 and peaked at number two on 24 November, unable to dislodge "When You're in Love with a Beautiful Woman" by Dr. Hook from the top position for two weeks. In the United States, the song entered the Billboard Hot 100 on 22 December 1979 at number 58 before reaching number one on 23 February 1980, where it remained for four consecutive weeks, becoming Queen's first US number-one single. The song also reached number one in Australia, Canada, and the Netherlands.

== Music video ==
The music video for the song, directed by Denis deVance, was filmed at Trillion Studios in London on 21 September 1979 and features four dancers, including Nikki Billyeald and Julie Warwick, as well as a floor made up of hands. An alternate version was later included on the Days of Our Lives DVD and Blu-ray releases.

== Live performances ==
Shortly after releasing the single, the band embarked on a mini tour across Ireland and the United Kingdom entitled the Crazy Tour. Having played acoustic rhythm guitar on the recording, Mercury played it in concert for the first time during the tour.

In some live performances of the track, the band added an extended rock ending that brought the song to over five minutes, with May and Mercury playing guitar together. Piano parts were added in and typically performed by touring musician Spike Edney.

The song was notably included on Queen's setlist for the 1985 Live Aid dual-venue benefit concert.

== Personnel ==
- Freddie Mercury – lead and backing vocals, acoustic guitar, hand claps
- Brian May – backing vocals, electric guitar, hand claps
- Roger Taylor – backing vocals, drums, hand claps
- John Deacon – bass guitar, hand claps

Although Mercury played an acoustic-electric twelve-string Ovation Pacemaker 1615 guitar and later an electric six-string Fender Telecaster (both owned by May) during live performances, he recorded the studio version of the song using a six-string acoustic guitar with external microphones. The original guitar recording has since been lost.

== Charts ==
=== Weekly charts ===
Chart (1979–1980)	Peak position
Australia (Kent Music Report)	1
Austria (Ö3 Austria Top 40)	9
Belgium (Joepie)	2
Belgium (Ultratop 50 Flanders)	3
Canada Top Singles (RPM)	1
Ireland (IRMA)	2
Netherlands (Dutch Top 40)	1
Netherlands (Single Top 100)	1
Norway (VG-lista)	8
New Zealand (Recorded Music NZ)	2
South Africa (Springbok Radio)	3
Spain (AFYVE)	17
Switzerland (Schweizer Hitparade)	5
UK Singles (Official Charts)	2
US Billboard Hot 100	1
US Adult Contemporary (Billboard)	17
West Germany (GfK)	13

Chart (2018)	Peak position
US Hot Rock & Alternative Songs (Billboard)	18

=== Year-end charts ===
Chart (1979)	Position
Belgium (Ultratop Flanders)	42
Netherlands (Dutch Top 40)	30
Netherlands (Single Top 100)	14
UK Singles (OCC)	25

Chart (1980)	Position
Australia (Kent Music Report)	3
Canada Top Singles (RPM)	2
New Zealand (Recorded Music NZ)	10
US Billboard Hot 100	6
West Germany (Official German Charts)	56

Chart (2019)	Position
US Hot Rock Songs (Billboard)	61

=== All-time charts ===
Chart (1958–2018)	Position
US Billboard Hot 100	156

== Certifications ==
Region	Certification	Certified units/sales
Denmark (IFPI Danmark)	Platinum	90,000^{‡}
Germany (BVMI)	Gold	300,000^{‡}
Italy (FIMI)	Platinum	100,000^{‡}
Netherlands (NVPI)	Platinum	150,000^{^}
New Zealand (RMNZ)	4× Platinum	120,000^{‡}
Spain (Promusicae)	2× Platinum	120,000^{‡}
United Kingdom (BPI)	2× Platinum	1,200,000^{‡}
United States (RIAA)	Platinum	1,000,000^{‡}
^{^} Shipments figures based on certification alone.^{‡} Sales+streaming figures based on certification alone.

== Dwight Yoakam version ==
"Crazy Little Thing Called Love"
- UK CD picture sleeve

Single by Dwight Yoakam

from the album Last Chance for a Thousand Years: Dwight Yoakam's Greatest Hits from the 90's
- B-side: "Let's Work Together"; "Doin' What I Did"
- Released: 19 May 1999
- Genre: Country
- Length: 2:22
- Label: Reprise
- Songwriter: Freddie Mercury
- Producer: Pete Anderson

Dwight Yoakam singles chronology
"These Arms" (1998)	"Crazy Little Thing Called Love" (1999)	"Thinking About Leaving" (1999)

American country music singer Dwight Yoakam included a cover of the song on his 1999 album Last Chance for a Thousand Years: Dwight Yoakam's Greatest Hits from the 90's. Yoakam's version was released as a single. It debuted at number 65 on the US Billboard "Hot Country Singles & Tracks" chart for the week of 1 May 1999, and peaked at number 12 on the US country singles charts that year. It was also used in a television commercial for clothing retailer Gap at the time of the album's release. The music video was directed by Yoakam. This version appears in the movie The Break-Up (2006), starring Vince Vaughn and Jennifer Aniston.

=== Charts ===
Chart (1999)	Peak position
Canada Adult Contemporary (RPM)	19
Canada Country Singles (RPM)	1
UK Singles Chart	35
US Billboard Hot 100	64
US Hot Country Songs (Billboard)	12

Year-end chart (1999)	Rank
Canada Country Tracks (RPM)	22
US Country Songs (Billboard)	64

== See also ==
- List of Billboard Hot 100 number-one singles of 1980
