= Streets of Bakersfield =

1988 song by Dwight Yoakam and Buck Owens

Single by Dwight Yoakam with Buck Owens

from the album Buenas Noches from a Lonely Room
- B-side: "Please, Please Baby"
- Released: June 17, 1988
- Genre: Country
- Length: 2:48
- Label: Reprise 27964
- Songwriter: Homer Joy
- Producer: Pete Anderson

Dwight Yoakam singles chronology
"Always Late with Your Kisses" (1988)	"Streets of Bakersfield" (1988)	"I Sang Dixie" (1988)

Buck Owens singles chronology
"Without You" (1981)	"Streets of Bakersfield" (1988)	"Hot Dog" (1988)

"Streets of Bakersfield" is a 1973 song written by Homer Joy and popularized by Buck Owens. In 1988, Owens recorded a duet version with country singer Dwight Yoakam, which became one of Yoakam's first No. 1 Hot Country Singles hits.

The song, which was written by songwriter Homer Joy, was first recorded by Buck Owens in 1972 with little success. Dwight Yoakam persuaded Buck Owens to join him on a re-make of his 1972 song. After the duo performed it on a CBS television show, they recorded and released the song, which reached No. 1 in Billboard magazine's Hot Country Singles. It was the first time since 1972 that Buck Owens had a No. 1 hit. The duet version has a strong influence of local Mexican culture, including the use of a Mexican-style accordion. Accordionist Flaco Jiménez recorded the bouncy accordion accompaniment to the song, which can resemble a Mexican polka. It belongs to a sub-genre of country music known as Bakersfield sound.

== Background ==
Homer Joy, the song's writer, was approached in 1972 by representatives from Buck Owens' studio in Bakersfield, California, about recording a "Hank Williams Sr. soundalike-album". Joy initially refused, saying "I don't want be like Hank, I just want to be me!" Eventually, he agreed to come in and record it, on the condition that he would also get to record some of his own songs as well. After the recording, however, the studio manager told Joy that he'd forgotten that the Buckaroos (Buck Owens' band) were practicing for an upcoming tour, and that Joy would have to wait to record his original songs.

Refusing to back down, Joy would show up at the studio at 8 AM every morning, only to be told that the Buckaroos were busy and that he would still have to wait. One night, Joy decided to take a walk around downtown Bakersfield, only to have the brand-new cowboy boots he'd been wearing give him blisters all over his feet: "[I] barely made it back to the car, and on top of that, I was still upset about everything, and I went back to my hotel room and wrote "Streets of Bakersfield"".

As usual, Joy went to the studio at 8 AM the following morning, and the studio manager, out of frustration, grabbed a guitar off of the wall and gave it to Joy, saying, "Sing me one of the songs that you'd record if we could get some time to record it." As kind of an "in-your-face" gesture, Joy performed his eight-hour-old "Streets of Bakersfield". Afterward, the studio producer went into the back of the studio, brought out Buck Owens, and had Joy play it again. Owens then said to the manager, "The Buckaroos have the day off, but you call them and tell them that we're going to do a recording session on Homer this afternoon."

Buck Owens released a recording of the song in 1973, and while that version was not a major hit, the re-recording he did with Dwight Yoakam in 1988 (with slightly changed lyrics) reached #1 on the Billboard Country Music charts.

== Content ==
The song details the journey of the narrator, told in first person, to Bakersfield, saying "I came here looking for something/ I couldn't find anywhere else/ I don't want to be nobody/ Just want a chance to be myself" and "I've done a thousand miles of thumbing/ And I've wore blisters on my heels/ trying to find me something better/ here on the streets of Bakersfield". (Both of these stanzas came from Homer Joy's experience in Bakersfield leading up to him writing the song). The chorus (originally a poke at the studio producer) says, "You don't know me but you don't like me/ You say you care less how I feel/ But how many of you that sit and judge me/ Ever walk the streets of Bakersfield?".

The second half of the song details an incident in San Francisco where the narrator is arrested and has to spend a night in jail, presumably for vagrancy. During the night that he was incarcerated, the police throw a drunk man in the narrator's jail cell. While he was passed out, the narrator takes $15 from the drunk man, leaving him his watch and his old house key, saying "I don't like folks thinking that I'd steal/ Then I thanked him as he was sleeping/ and I headed out for Bakersfield". (Whether or not this was something that actually happened to Joy is unknown.)

== Legacy ==
- In 1988, the song was recorded by country music artist Dwight Yoakam and Buck Owens, and was the lead-off single to Yoakam's 1988 album Buenas Noches from a Lonely Room. The music video for the Yoakam/Owens single was directed by Marcus Stevens.
- Actor and comedian Vince Vaughn sang the song live with Dwight Yoakam to a live audience in Bakersfield, California on his Wild West Comedy Tour.
- In 2023, Congressman Kevin McCarthy referenced the song in a speech after being elected Speaker of the U.S. House of Representatives.

== Charts ==
=== Weekly charts ===
Chart (1988)	Peak position
US Hot Country Songs (Billboard)	1
Canadian RPM Country Tracks	1

=== Year-end charts ===
Chart (1988)	Position
Canadian RPM Country Tracks	1
US Hot Country Songs (Billboard)	20
