= Little Sister (Elvis Presley song) =

1961 single by Elvis Presley

Single by Elvis Presley
- A-side: "(Marie's the Name) His Latest Flame"
- Released: August 8, 1961
- Recorded: June 25-26, 1961
- Studio: RCA Studio B, Nashville, Tennessee
- Genre: Rock and roll; rock; rockabilly
- Length: 2:33
- Label: RCA Victor
- Songwriters: Doc Pomus, Mort Shuman
- Producer: Steve Sholes

Elvis Presley singles chronology
"Wild in the Country" / "I Feel So Bad" (1961)	"(Marie's the Name) His Latest Flame" / "Little Sister" (1961)	"Rock-A-Hula Baby" / "Can't Help Falling in Love" (1961)

Official audio
- "Little Sister" on YouTube

"Little Sister" is a rock and roll song written by Doc Pomus and Mort Shuman. It was originally released as a single in 1961 by American singer Elvis Presley, who enjoyed a No. 5 hit with it on the Billboard Hot 100. The single (as a double A-side with "(Marie's the Name) His Latest Flame") also reached No. 1 in the UK Singles Chart. Lead guitar was played by Hank Garland and the rhythm guitar was played by Scotty Moore with backing vocals by the Jordanaires featuring the distinctive bass voice of Ray Walker.

Presley performs the song as part of a medley with "Get Back" in the 1970 rockumentary film Elvis: That's the Way It Is. "Little Sister" would later be covered by such artists as Dwight Yoakam, Robert Plant, The Nighthawks and Pearl Jam. A version by Ry Cooder, from his album Bop Till You Drop, was a number-one hit in New Zealand.

An answer song to "Little Sister" with the same melody but different lyrics was recorded and released under the title "Hey, Memphis" by LaVern Baker on Atlantic Records (Atlantic 2119-A) in September 1961.

== Personnel ==
Credits from Ernst Jorgensen and Keith Flynn’s study of RCA and musicians’ union/AFM paperwork and session tapes.

- Elvis Presley – lead vocals
- Scotty Moore – acoustic guitar, rhythm guitar
- Hank Garland – electric lead guitar
- Harold Bradley – six-string “tic-tac” bass guitar
- Bob Moore – double bass
- D. J. Fontana – drums
- Buddy Harman – drums
- The Jordanaires (Gordon Stoker, Hoyt Hawkins, Neal Matthews Jr., Ray Walker) – backing vocals

== Chart positions ==
=== Elvis Presley ===
Chart (1961–1962)	Peak position
Belgium (Ultratop 50 Flanders)	1
Belgium (Ultratop 50 Wallonia)	11
Netherlands (Single Top 100)	5
Norway (VG-lista)	6
US Billboard Hot 100	5
West Germany (Media Control)	25

== Dwight Yoakam version ==
"Little Sister"

Single by Dwight Yoakam

from the album Hillbilly Deluxe
- B-side: "This Drinkin' Will Kill Me"
- Released: February 1987
- Recorded: 1987
- Genre: Country
- Length: 3:01
- Label: Reprise
- Songwriters: Doc Pomus, Mort Shuman
- Producer: Pete Anderson

Dwight Yoakam singles chronology
"It Won't Hurt" (1986)	"Little Sister" (1987)	"Little Ways" (1987)

Music video
- "Little Sister" on YouTube

Chart (1987)	Peak position
US Hot Country Songs (Billboard)	7
Canadian RPM Country Tracks	3
RIANZ charts	35

=== Music video ===
The music video for Dwight Yoakam's 1987 version of "Little Sister" was directed by Sherman Halsey.

== Other recorded versions ==
- Ry Cooder as the opening track on his 1979 album Bop Till You Drop.
- Rockpile with Robert Plant on the 1981 album Concerts for the People of Kampuchea.
