= I Sang Dixie =

Single by Dwight Yoakam

from the album Buenas Noches from a Lonely Room
- B-side: "Floyd County"
- Released: October 1988
- Recorded: 1988
- Genre: Country
- Length: 3:28
- Label: Reprise 27715
- Songwriter: Dwight Yoakam
- Producer: Pete Anderson

Dwight Yoakam singles chronology
"Streets of Bakersfield" (1988)	"I Sang Dixie" (1988)	"I Got You" (1989)

"I Sang Dixie" is a song written and recorded by American country music artist Dwight Yoakam. It was released in October 1988 as the second single from his album Buenas Noches from a Lonely Room. In 1989, the song went to number one on the US Country chart. Rolling Stone ranked "I Sang Dixie" No. 26 on its list of the 40 Saddest Country Songs of All time in 2019.

== Content ==
The song's narrator describes meeting a man from the Southern United States dying on a street in Los Angeles. The narrator, while crying, holds the man and sings 'Dixie' to comfort him as he dies. He goes on to describe how others "walk on by" ignoring the man's suffering. The dying man warns the narrator with his final words to "run back home to that southern land" and escape "what life here has done to [him]".

== Background ==
Yoakam told the story of how he came up with the song at a concert in Athens, Georgia on Nov 13, 2025. He recalled stopping into a pizza shop in California with his brother, and while they were waiting for their food Yoakam saw two men standing outside the shop. One was older and had fallen in the street, and upon getting up fell once more and hit his head. Yoakam and his brother exited the pizza shop to try and help while waiting for an ambulance to arrive. Yoakam reported that the men spoke in thick southern accents. The older man was eventually taken into the ambulance and driven away.

== Chart performance ==
Chart (1988–1989)	Peak position
US Hot Country Songs (Billboard)	1
Canadian RPM Country Tracks	1

=== Year-end charts ===
Chart (1989)	Position
Canada Country Tracks (RPM)	6
US Country Songs (Billboard)	23

== Demo version ==
Yoakam originally recorded a demo version of the song in 1981. It can be found on his 2002 boxed set, Reprise Please, Baby and on the 2006 Deluxe version of Guitars, Cadillacs, Etc., Etc.
