= It Only Hurts When I Cry =

1991 single by Dwight Yoakam

Single by Dwight Yoakam

from the album If There Was a Way
- B-side: "Let's Work Together"
- Released: December 21, 1991
- Recorded: 1990
- Genre: Country
- Length: 2:34
- Label: Reprise 19148
- Songwriters: Dwight Yoakam, Roger Miller
- Producer: Pete Anderson

Dwight Yoakam singles chronology
| "Nothing's Changed Here" (1991) | "It Only Hurts When I Cry" (1991) | "The Heart That You Own" (1992) |

"It Only Hurts When I Cry" is a song co-written by American country music artists Dwight Yoakam and Roger Miller, and recorded by Yoakam. It was released in December 1991 as the fourth single from his album If There Was a Way. It peaked at #7 in the United States, and at #4 in Canada. This song was one of the last ones written by Miller before his 1992 death. The song was covered by Raul Malo on his 2007 album After Hours.

== Music video ==
The music video was directed by Piers Plowden, and is entirely in black and white.

== Chart performance ==
| Chart (1991–1992) | Peak position |
|---|---|
| Canada Country Singles (RPM) | 4 |
| US Hot Country Songs (Billboard) | 7 |

=== Year-end charts ===
| Chart (1992) | Position |
|---|---|
| Canada Country Tracks (RPM) | 61 |
| US Country Songs (Billboard) | 73 |

== Cover Versions ==
- 2022 - John Greene, Back to Earth
