= Pete Anderson =

American guitarist, music producer, arranger and songwriter

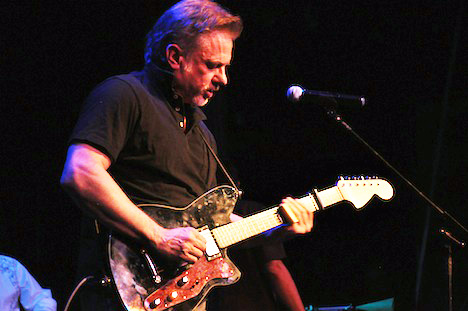
- Pete Anderson - Live in Concert

Background information
- Born: July 23, 1948 (age 77); Detroit, Michigan, U.S.
- Genres: Country; Americana; blues; rock; roots rock; Bakersfield Sound; flamenco; rockabilly; Tex-Mex
- Occupations: Guitarist, record producer, arranger, songwriter
- Instruments: Electric guitar; acoustic guitar; baritone guitar; banjo; mandolin; bass guitar; harmonica; drums; vocals
- Years active: 1984-present
- Labels: Reprise/Warner Bros.; Mercury/Polygram; Capitol; Audium; Rhino/Reprise; Little Dog
- Website: www.peteanderson.com

Pete Anderson (born July 23, 1948) is an American guitarist, music producer, arranger and songwriter.

Anderson is most known for his guitar work with, and critically acclaimed production of, country music star Dwight Yoakam from 1984 through 2002, a partnership that resulted in numerous platinum records, sold-out tours, and some music in the Bakersfield and hillbilly traditions. On guitar, Anderson's technical proficiency and versatility allows him to perform a variety of styles, including country, western, rock, rockabilly, soul, blues, Flamenco, Tex-Mex.

Among the artists Anderson has produced are Dwight Yoakam, Roy Orbison, Jason Boland and the Stragglers, Meat Puppets, Jackson Browne, Michelle Shocked, Buck Owens, k.d. Lang, Steve Pryor Band, Lonesome Strangers, and Lucinda Williams. He more recently produced Mark Chesnutt's album Outlaw (2010) and George Ducas' album Long Way From Home (2024)

== Record label ==
In 1993, along with Dusty Wakeman, Anderson joined Barbara Hein, a longtime Capitol Records executive with a history in the music business, and engineer Michael Dumas to form Little Dog Records. Recording his first solo CD on his own label in 1994, Anderson placed himself on the road in support of Working Class, a country-blues-rock-roots music extravaganza produced by Wakeman. While continuing to work with Yoakam, being the president of a record label opened new worlds for Anderson. Signing artists that he and his partners believed in gave Anderson the creative freedom he craved. Having to be part businessman and part artist was a difficult part to play every day, but Anderson proved he was up to the challenge when he negotiated a distribution deal with Polygram in 1996. Anderson stuck with Wakeman for his second release, 1997's Dogs In Heaven.

== Discography ==
Solo albums

- Working Class (1994)
- Dogs In Heaven (1997)
- Live At Ohio University (1998)
- Daredevil (2004)
- Even Things Up (2009)
- Birds Above Guitarland (2013)
- Live At The Moose (2015)

With Dwight Yoakam

- Guitars, Cadillacs, Etc., Etc. (1986)
- Hillbilly Deluxe (1987)
- Buenas Noches From a Lonely Room (1988)
- Just Lookin' for a Hit (1989) compilation
- If There Was a Way (1990)
- "Suspicious Minds" (Single) (1992)
- La Croix D'Amour (1992) compilation
- This Time (1993)
- Gone (1995)
- Dwight Live (1995)
- Under the Covers (1997)
- Come On Christmas (1997)
- A Long Way Home (1998)
- Last Chance for a Thousand Years (1999) compilation
- "Crazy Little Thing Called Love" (Single) (1999)
- dwightyoakamacoustic.net (2000)
- Tomorrow's Sounds Today (2000)
- South of Heaven, West of Hell (Soundtrack) (2001)
- Reprise Please Baby (2002) 4CD compilation
- Population Me (2003)
- In Others' Words (2003) compilation
- Dwight's Used Records (2004) compilation
- The Very Best of Dwight Yoakam (2004) compilation
- Live from Austin, TX (1988, [rel. 2005])

With Michelle Shocked

- Short Sharp Shocked (1988) producer, arranger, electric guitar, bass, 6-string bass
- Captain Swing (1989) producer, arranger, electric guitar
- Beautiful Dreamer - The Songs Of Stephen Foster (2004) producer, acoustic guitar on "Oh Susana"

With Various artists

- Stealin' Horses: Stealin' Horses (1985): guitar
- The Lonesome Strangers: Lonesome Pine (1986): producer
- Rosie Flores: Rosie Flores (1987): producer, arranger, guitar, bass, mandolin
- Asleep At The Wheel: 10 (1987): guitar
- The Black Velvet Band: When Justice Came (1989): producer, guitar, mandolin
- Darden Smith: Trouble No More (1990): producer, guitar
- Martin Stephenson and the Daintees: Left Us To Burn (1990): producer
- Jackson Browne: "First Girl I Loved" (Single) (1990): producer, arranger
- Blue Rodeo: Casino (1991): producer, guitar, mandolin
- Meat Puppets: Forbidden Places (1991): producer
- Thelonius Monster: Beautiful Mess (1991): producer
- Steve Pryor Band: Steve Pryor Band (Zoo Entertainment) (1991): producer
- Flaco Jimenez: Partners (1992): guitar
- Steve Forbert: The American in Me (1992): producer, guitar
- Buck Owens: The Buck Owens Collection (1959–1990) (1992): producer, guitar
- Roy Orbison: King Of Hearts (1992): producer
- Bobby Crynor: Bobby Crynor (1992): guitar
- Anthony Crawford: Anthony Crawford (1993): producer, guitar, harmonica
- Jim Matt: All My Wild Oats (1994): producer
- The Mavericks: What A Crying Shame (1994): songwriter on "Neon Blue"
- Jeff Finlin: Highway Diaries (1995): producer
- Carl Peterson: Scotland The Brave (1995): drums
- Scott Joss: Souvenirs (1996): producer, arranger, guitar
- Sara Evans: Three Chords & The Truth (1997): producer, arranger, guitar, bass
- The Lonesome Strangers: Land Of Opportunity (1997): producer
- Mark Insley: Good Country Junk (1997): guitar
- The Backsliders: Throwin' Rocks At The Moon (1997): producer
- The Blazers: Just For You (1997): producer, guitar
- Joy Lynn White: Lucky Few (1997): producer, guitar
- Wooden Circus: Wooden Circus (Lemon Drop) (1998): producer
- Heather Myles: Highways & Honky Tonks (1998): guitar
- Scott Joss: Invite Scott Joss Into Your Living Room (1998): producer
- Amanda Garrigues: Spirit Act (1999): engineer
- Flaco Jimenez: Sleepytown (2000): producer, guitar
- Scott Joss: A New Reason To Care (2000): producer, guitar
- Blue Rodeo: Greatest Hits (2001): producer
- William Norman Edwards: Down Here (2001): producer, guitar, bass, mandolin, banjo
- Danni Leigh: Divide And Conquer (2001): producer
- Jim Lauderdale: Point Of No Return - The Unreleased 1989 Album (2001): producer
- The Blazers: Seventeen Jewels (2003): producer
- Moot Davis: Moot Davis (2003): producer, guitar
- Cisco: 7740 Valmont St. (2004): producer, arranger, guitar
- Curt Kirkwood: Snow (2005): producer, guitar, bass, mandolin
- Chris Jones: Too Far Down The Road (2006): producer, guitar, bass, mandolin, banjo
- Jason Boland: The Bourbon Legend (2006): producer
- BJ Thomas: "Nashville Rain" (Single) (2006): producer, guitar, sitar, bass
- Erasure: "Boy (Remix)" (2006): producer, guitar
- Adam Hood: Different Groove (2007): producer, arranger, guitar, lap steel guitar, mandolin, percussion
- Moot Davis: Already Moved On (2007): producer, guitar
- The Blazers: Dreaming A Dream (2008): producer
- Tanya Tucker: My Turn (2009): producer, guitar, bass, harmonica, mandolin
- Mark Chesnutt: Outlaw (2010): producer, guitar, bass, drums
- Grayson Hugh: Back To The Soul (2015): guest artist, guitar solo on "Rock 'N' Roll Man"
- Lightnin' Willie & the Poorboys: No Black No White Just Blues (2017): producer
- George Ducas: Long Way From Home (2024): producer, electric guitar, bass, percussion

Compilation albums

- A Town South of Bakersfield (1985) producer, arranger, acoustic & electric guitar, mandolin, 6-string bass
- Honky Tonk Country (Warner Bros.) (1986) producer, guitar
- Country Jukebox (Warner Bros.) (1986) producer, guitar
- A Town South of Bakersfield 2 (1988) producer, arranger, acoustic & electric guitar, mandolin, 6-string bass
- A Christmas Tradition, Volume II (1988) producer
- The New Tradition Sings The Old Tradition (1989) producer, guitar
- Classic Country Music: A Smithsonian Collection, Volume IV (1991) guitar
- Rockin' Country (1991) producer
- Favorite Country Duets (1991) producer
- Country Jukebox: Greatest Hits, Volume Two (1993) producer
- It's Now or Never: The Tribute To Elvis Presley (1994) guitar
- Little Dog Records: 1996 Sampler (1996) producer, multiple instruments
- The Best of Austin City Limits (1996) guitar
- Christmas Country (Warner Bros.) (1996) producer
- The Songs of Jimmie Rodgers: A Tribute (1997) producer, arranger, guitar
- The Songs of Dwight Yoakam: Will Sing For Food (1998) producer, dobro, guitar, mandolin, percussion
- Country Love Songs, Volume Four (2000) producer
- Hits of The Nineties, Volume One (Warner Bros.) (2000) producer
- Super Hits: Super Hats (2000) producer
- Favorite Country Duets, Volume 2 (2000) producer
- Young Guitar Slingers: Texas Blues Evolution (Antone's/Texas Music Group) (2001) producer, harmonica
- A Country Superstar Christmas 4 (2001) producer
- Totally Country (17 New Chart-Topping Hits) (2002) producer
- A Country West of Nashville (Little Dog) (2003) producer, multiple instruments
