= Vince Gill singles discography =

Vince Gill discography
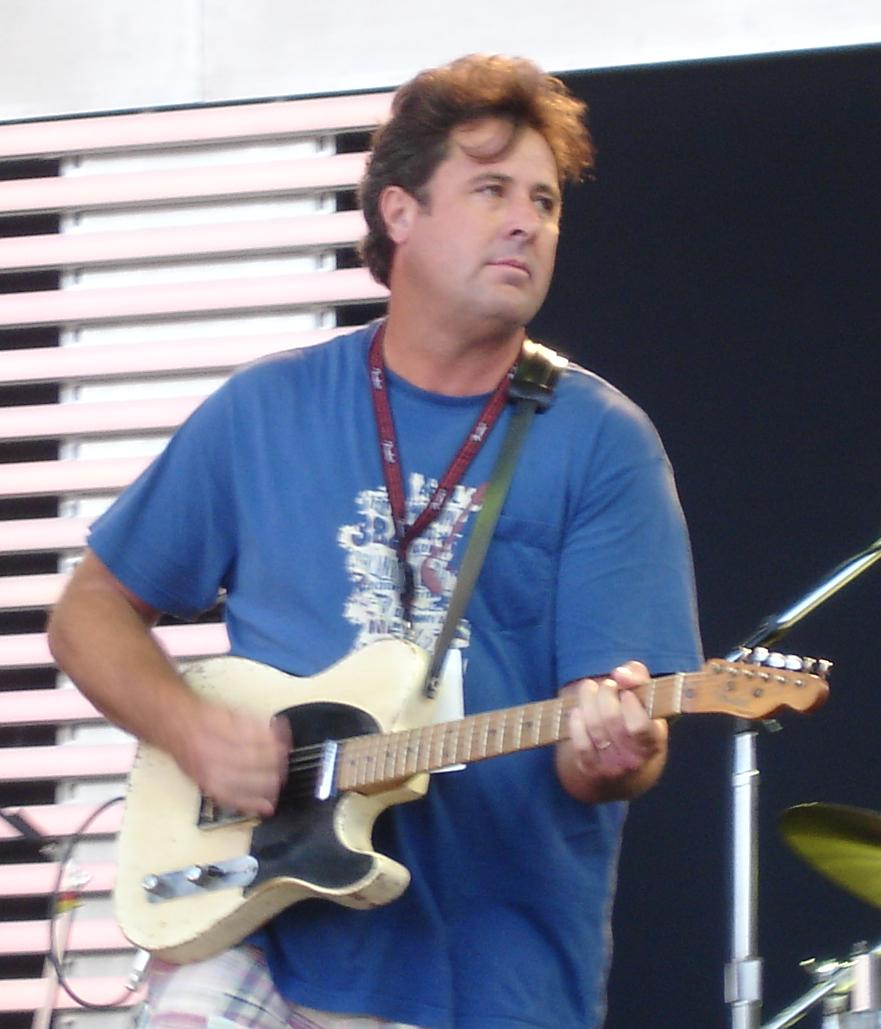
- Gill in 2007
- Singles: 54
- Music videos: 39

American musician Vince Gill has released 54 singles, 39 music videos, and a large number of collaborations. Gill charted for the first time on Billboard Hot Country Songs in 1984 with "Victim of Life's Circumstances", a cut from his debut extended play Turn Me Loose. Gill has four number one singles on this chart as a solo artist: "I Still Believe in You", "Don't Let Our Love Start Slippin' Away", "One More Last Chance", and "Tryin' to Get Over You", all between 1992 and 1994. He also has three number one singles on this chart as a featured artist: on Reba McEntire's "The Heart Won't Lie" in 1993, along with Chris Young's "Sober Saturday Night" and the multi-artist "Forever Country", both in 2016.

== Singles ==
=== 1980s ===
Year	Single	Peak positions		Album
Year	Single	US Country	CAN Country	Album
1984	"Victim of Life's Circumstances"	40	—	Turn Me Loose
1984	"Oh Carolina"	38	—	Turn Me Loose
1984	"Turn Me Loose"	39	—	Turn Me Loose
1985	"True Love"	32	—	The Things That Matter
1985	"If It Weren't for Him" (with Rosanne Cash)	10	5	The Things That Matter
1985	"Oklahoma Borderline"	9	27	The Things That Matter
1986	"With You"	33	43	The Things That Matter
1987	"Cinderella"	5	3	The Way Back Home
1987	"Let's Do Something"	16	17	The Way Back Home
1988	"Everybody's Sweetheart"	11	3	The Way Back Home
1988	"The Radio"	39	32	The Way Back Home
1989	"Never Alone"	22	35	When I Call Your Name
"—" denotes releases that did not chart

=== 1990s ===
Year	Single	Peak positions					Certifications (sales threshold)	Album
Year	Single	US Country	US	US AC	CAN Country	CAN AC	Certifications (sales threshold)	Album
1990	"Oklahoma Swing" (with Reba McEntire)	13	—	—	7	—		When I Call Your Name
1990	"When I Call Your Name"	2	—	—	5	—	RIAA: Gold	When I Call Your Name
1990	"Never Knew Lonely"	3	—	—	7	—		When I Call Your Name
1991	"Pocket Full of Gold"	7	—	—	11	—		Pocket Full of Gold
1991	"Liza Jane"	7	—	—	3	—		Pocket Full of Gold
1991	"Look at Us"	4	—	—	12	—	RIAA: Gold	Pocket Full of Gold
1992	"Take Your Memory with You"	2	—	—	3	—		Pocket Full of Gold
1992	"I Still Believe in You"	1	—	30	1	34		I Still Believe in You
1992	"Don't Let Our Love Start Slippin' Away"	1	—	—	1	—	RIAA: Gold	I Still Believe in You
1993	"No Future in the Past"	3	—	—	2	—		I Still Believe in You
1993	"One More Last Chance"	1	—	—	1	26	RIAA: Gold	I Still Believe in You
1994	"Tryin' to Get Over You"	1	88	—	1	—		I Still Believe in You
1994	"Whenever You Come Around"	2	72	—	2	—	RIAA: Gold	When Love Finds You
1994	"What the Cowgirls Do"	2	—	—	1	—		When Love Finds You
1994	"When Love Finds You"	3	— (Note: "When Love Finds You" did not enter the Billboard Hot 100, but peaked at number nine on the Bubbling Under Hot 100 Singles chart.)	—	5	—		When Love Finds You
1995	"Which Bridge to Cross (Which Bridge to Burn)"	4	—	—	3	—		When Love Finds You
1995	"You Better Think Twice"	2	—	—	2	—		When Love Finds You
1995	"Go Rest High on That Mountain"	14	—	—	7	—	RIAA: 2× Platinum	When Love Finds You
1996	"High Lonesome Sound"	12	—	—	1	—		High Lonesome Sound
1996	"Worlds Apart"	5	—	—	6	—		High Lonesome Sound
1996	"Pretty Little Adriana"	2	—	—	3	—		High Lonesome Sound
1997	"A Little More Love"	2	—	—	6	—		High Lonesome Sound
1997	"You and You Alone"	8	—	—	8	—		High Lonesome Sound
1998	"If You Ever Have Forever in Mind"	5	60	—	1	—		The Key
1998	"Kindly Keep It Country"	33	—	—	32	—		The Key
1999	"Don't Come Cryin' to Me"	27	— (Note: "Don't Come Cryin' to Me" did not enter the Billboard Hot 100, but peaked at number 15 on the Bubbling Under Hot 100 Singles chart.)	—	24	—		The Key
1999	"My Kind of Woman/My Kind of Man" (with Patty Loveless)	27	— (Note: "My Kind of Woman/My Kind of Man" did not enter the Billboard Hot 100, but peaked at number 16 on the Bubbling Under Hot 100 Singles chart.)	—	23	—		The Key
"—" denotes releases that did not chart

=== 2000s and 2010s ===
Year	Single	Peak chart positions			Album
Year	Single	US Country	US	CAN Country	Album
2000	"Let's Make Sure We Kiss Goodbye"	20	— (Note: "Let's Make Sure We Kiss Goodbye" did not enter the Billboard Hot 100, but peaked at number two on the Bubbling Under Hot 100 Singles chart.)	25	Let's Make Sure We Kiss Goodbye
2000	"Feels Like Love"	6	52	13	Let's Make Sure We Kiss Goodbye
2001	"Shoot Straight from Your Heart"	31	—	—	Let's Make Sure We Kiss Goodbye
2002	"Next Big Thing"	17	— (Note: "Next Big Thing" did not enter the Billboard Hot 100, but peaked at number five on the Bubbling Under Hot 100 Singles chart.)	—	Next Big Thing
2003	"Someday"	31	—	—	Next Big Thing
2003	"Young Man's Town"	44	—	—	Next Big Thing
2004	"In These Last Few Days"	51	—	—	Next Big Thing
2006	"The Reason Why" (with Alison Krauss)	28	—	—	These Days
2007	"What You Give Away" (with Sheryl Crow)	43	—	—	These Days
2007	"How Lonely Looks"	—	—	—	These Days
2011	"Threaten Me with Heaven"	42	—	—	Guitar Slinger
2016	"Take Me Down" (featuring Little Big Town)	— (Note: "Take Me Down" did not enter Hot Country Songs, but peaked at number 60 on Billboard Country Airplay.)	—	—	Down to My Last Bad Habit
2016	"Me and My Girl"	— (Note: "Me and My Girl" did not enter Hot Country Songs, but peaked at number 51 on Billboard Country Indicator.)	—	—	Down to My Last Bad Habit
2019	"A Letter to My Mama"	—	—	—	Okie
"—" denotes releases that did not chart

=== 2020s ===
Year	Single	Peak chart positions	Album
Year	Single	US Christ	Album
2025	"Go Rest High on That Mountain (Extended Version)"	42	50 Years from Home: I Gave You Everything I Had
"—" denotes releases that did not chart

=== As a featured artist ===
Year	Single	Peak positions								Certifications	Album
Year	Single	US Country	US Country Airplay	US	US AC	CAN Country	CAN	CAN AC	UK	Certifications	Album
1990	"Tomorrow's World" (Note: All-star collaboration featuring Lynn Anderson, Butch Baker, Shane Barmby, Billy Hill, Suzy Bogguss, Kix Brooks, T. Graham Brown, The Burch Sisters, Holly Dunn, Foster & Lloyd, Vince Gill, William Lee Golden, Highway 101, Shelby Lynne, Johnny Rodriguez, Dan Seals, Les Taylor, Pam Tillis, Mac Wiseman, and Kevin Welch.)	74		—	—	—	—	—	—		Non-album single
1991	"Restless" (Mark O'Connor and the New Nashville Cats (Note: Song featured Vince Gill, Ricky Skaggs, and Steve Wariner.))	25		—	—	19	—	—	—		The New Nashville Cats
1993	"The Heart Won't Lie" (Reba McEntire with Vince Gill)	1		—	—	1	—	—	—	RIAA: Gold	It's Your Call
1994	"Daydream" (Kermit the Frog with Vince Gill)	—		—	—	65	—	—	—		Kermit Unpigged
1994	"House of Love" (Amy Grant with Vince Gill)	—		37	5	—	9	2	46		House of Love
1995	"I Will Always Love You" (Dolly Parton with Vince Gill)	15		—	—	22	—	—	—		Something Special
1996	"Hope" (as Hope: Country Music's Quest for a Cure (Note: Multi-artist collaboration featuring John Berry, Terri Clark, Vince Gill, Faith Hill, Tracy Lawrence, Little Texas, Neal McCoy, Tim McGraw, Lorrie Morgan, Marty Stuart, Travis Tritt, and Trisha Yearwood.))	57		—	—	—	—	—	—		Non-album single
1998	"It's Not Over" (Mark Chesnutt with Vince Gill and Alison Krauss)	34		—	—	34	—	—	—		Thank God for Believers
1999	"If You Ever Leave Me" (Barbra Streisand with Vince Gill)	62		—	—	67	—	29	—		A Love Like Ours
2001	"America the Beautiful" (Note: Multi-artist collaboration featuring Trace Adkins, Billy Dean, Vince Gill, Carolyn Dawn Johnson, Toby Keith, Brenda Lee, Lonestar, Martina McBride, Jamie O'Neal, Kenny Rogers, and Keith Urban.)	58		—	—	—	—	—	—		Non-album single
2005	"Not Me" (Keni Thomas with Vince Gill and Emmylou Harris)	47		—	—	—	—	—	—		Flags of Our Fathers
2006	"Building Bridges" (Brooks & Dunn with Sheryl Crow and Vince Gill)	4		66	—	2	—	—	—		Hillbilly Deluxe
2008	"Gimme Some Water" (Eddie Money with Vince Gill)	—		—	—	—	—	—	—		Non-album single
2012	"Train Wreck" (Marlee Scott featuring Vince Gill)	— (Note: "Train Wreck" did not enter Hot Country Songs or Country Airplay, but peaked at number 43 on Billboard Country Indicator.)		—	—	34	—	—	—		Beautiful Maybe
2012	"Don't Rush" (Kelly Clarkson featuring Vince Gill)	23	27	87	—	—	53	—	—		Greatest Hits – Chapter One
2013	"I Just Can't Help Believing" (B. J. Thomas with Vince Gill)	—	—	—	—	—	—	—	—		The Living Room Sessions
2013	"Don't Cross Me Wrong" (John Oates featuring Vince Gill)	—	—	—	—	—	—	—	—		Good Road to Follow
2014	"He'll Take Care of You" (T. Graham Brown with Vince Gill)	—	—	—	—	—	—	—	—		Forever Changed
2016	"Sober Saturday Night" (Chris Young featuring Vince Gill)	4	1	47	—	4	—	—	—	RIAA: Platinum	I'm Comin' Over
2016	"Forever Country" (as Artists of Then, Now & Forever)	1	32	21	—	34	25	—	—	RIAA: Gold	Non-album single
2017	"Dear Hate" (Maren Morris featuring Vince Gill)	18	29	91	—	39	—	—	—		Non-album single
2022	"Heaven by Then" (Brantley Gilbert featuring Blake Shelton and Vince Gill)	—	29	—	—	—	—	—	—		So Help Me God
"—" denotes releases that did not chart
