= Vince Gill albums discography =

Vince Gill discography
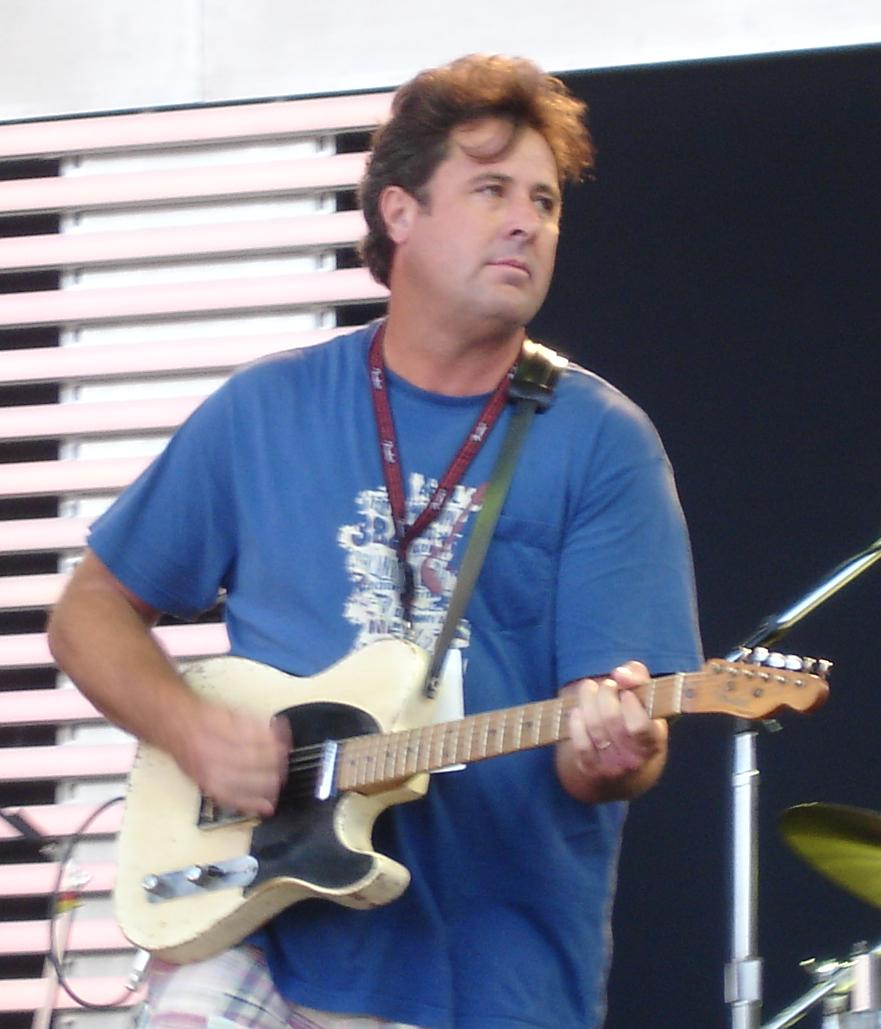
- Gill in 2007
- Studio albums: 19
- EPs: 7
- Compilation albums: 16
- Collaborative albums: 1

American musician Vince Gill has released 19 studio albums, 16 compilation albums, seven extended plays, and one multi-artist collaborative album. Gill made his debut in 1983 as a guest artist on David Grisman's Here Today, followed by his debut extended play Turn Me Loose in 1984 on RCA Records Nashville. Until 1988, he recorded for RCA, switching to MCA Records Nashville in 1989. Gill's most commercially successful album is 1992's I Still Believe in You, which was certified quintuple platinum by the Recording Industry Association of America (RIAA).

== Studio albums ==
=== 1980s and 1990s ===
Title	Album details	Peak positions				Certifications
Title	Album details	US Country	US	CAN Country	CAN	Certifications
The Things That Matter	Release date: April 29, 1985; Label: RCA Records; Formats: LP, CD, cassette	63	—	—	—	
The Way Back Home	Release date: April 27, 1987; Label: RCA Records; Formats: LP, CD, cassette	13	—	—	—	
When I Call Your Name	Release date: November 14, 1989; Label: MCA Records; Formats: LP, CD, cassette	2	67	—	—	CAN: Platinum; US: 2× Platinum
Pocket Full of Gold	Release date: March 5, 1991; Label: MCA Records; Formats: LP, CD, cassette	5	37	—	—	CAN: Platinum; US: 2× Platinum
I Still Believe in You	Release date: September 1, 1992; Label: MCA Records; Formats: CD, cassette	3	10	3	45	CAN: 3× Platinum; US: 5× Platinum
Let There Be Peace on Earth (Note: Let There Be Peace on Earth also peaked at number 1 on Top Holiday Albums.)	Release date: September 14, 1993; Label: MCA Records; Formats: CD, cassette	3	14	26	—	CAN: Gold; US: 2× Platinum
When Love Finds You	Release date: June 7, 1994; Label: MCA Records; Formats: CD, cassette	2	6	2	18	CAN: 2× Platinum; US: 4× Platinum
High Lonesome Sound	Release date: May 28, 1996; Label: MCA Records; Formats: CD, cassette	3	24	5	43	CAN: Gold; US: Platinum
The Key	Release date: August 11, 1998; Label: MCA Nashville; Formats: CD, cassette	1	11	2	25	CAN: Gold; US: Platinum
Breath of Heaven: A Christmas Collection (Note: Breath of Heaven: A Christmas Collection also peaked at number 3 on Top Holiday Albums and number 2 on Top Christian Albums.) (with Patrick Williams and His Orchestra)	Release date: September 8, 1998; Label: MCA Nashville; Formats: CD, cassette	6	39	—	—	US: Platinum
"—" denotes releases that did not chart

=== 2000s and 2010s ===
Title	Album details	Peak positions			Certifications	Sales
Title	Album details	US Country	US	CAN	Certifications	Sales
Let's Make Sure We Kiss Goodbye (Note: Let's Make Sure We Kiss Goodbye also peaked at number 6 on RPM Top Country Albums/CDs.)	Release date: April 18, 2000; Label: MCA Nashville; Formats: CD, cassette	4	39	—	US: Gold	
'Tis the Season (with Olivia Newton-John)	Release date: September 1, 2000; Label: Hallmark Entertainment; Formats: CD, cassette	—	—	—		
Next Big Thing	Release date: February 11, 2003; Label: MCA Nashville; Formats: CD, music download	4	14	—		US: 286,000
These Days	Release date: October 17, 2006; Label: MCA Nashville; Formats: CD, music download	4	17	—	US: Platinum	
Guitar Slinger	Release date: October 25, 2011; Label: MCA Nashville; Formats: CD, LP, music download	4	14	—		US: 102,000
Bakersfield (with Paul Franklin)	Release date: July 30, 2013; Label: MCA Nashville; Formats: CD, LP, music download	4	25	—		US: 56,000
Down to My Last Bad Habit	Release date: February 12, 2016; Label: MCA Nashville; Formats: CD, LP, music download	4	35	50		US: 81,600
Okie	Release date: August 23, 2019; Label: MCA Nashville; Formats: CD, LP, music download	9	71	—		US: 32,500
"—" denotes releases that did not chart

=== 2020s ===
Title	Album details
Sweet Memories (with Paul Franklin)	Release date: August 4, 2023; Label: MCA Nashville; Formats: CD, LP, music download

== Compilation albums ==
=== 1980s and 1990s ===
Title	Album details	Peak positions					Certifications
Title	Album details	US Country	US	AUS	CAN Country	CAN	Certifications
The Best of Vince Gill	Release date: September 25, 1989; Label: RCA Records; Formats: CD, cassette	—	—	—	—	—	US: Platinum
I Never Knew Lonely	Release date: March 10, 1992; Label: RCA Records; Formats: CD, cassette	47	—	—	4	—	US: Gold
Vince Gill and Friends	Release date: August 16, 1994; Label: BMG Special Products; Formats: CD, cassette	—	—	—	—	—	
The Essential Vince Gill	Release date: March 28, 1995; Label: RCA Records; Formats: CD, cassette	—	—	—	—	—	
Songs from the Heart	Release date: May 1995; Label: MCA Records Australia; Formats: CD	—	—	73	—	—	
Souvenirs	Release date: November 21, 1995; Label: MCA Records; Formats: CD, cassette	3	11	—	3	17	US: 3× Platinum
Super Hits	Release date: October 15, 1996; Label: RCA Records; Formats: CD, cassette	—	—	—	—	—	
Vintage Gill	Release date: 1997; Label: BMG Special Products; Formats: CD, cassette	—	—	—	—	—	
"—" denotes releases that did not chart

=== 2000s and 2010s ===
Title	Album details	Peak positions	Sales
Title	Album details	US Country	Sales
Platinum & Gold Collection	Release date: August 19, 2003; Label: BMG Heritage Records; Format: CD, music download	—	
Christmas Collection	Release date: August 15, 2006; Label: Madacy Entertainment; Formats: CD	68	US: 2,500
20th Century Masters: The Millennium Collection	Release date: March 13, 2007; Label: MCA Nashville; Formats: CD, music download	70	
Love Songs	Release date: January 26, 2010; Label: MCA Nashville; Formats: CD, music download	36	
Icon	Release date: August 31, 2010; Label: MCA Nashville; Formats: CD, music download	51	
Country: Vince Gill	Release date: September 10, 2012; Label: Legacy Recordings; Formats: CD	—	
Ballads	Release date: April 9, 2013; Label: MCA Nashville; Formats: CD, music download	56	
Icon: Christmas	Release date: November 6, 2015; Label: MCA Nashville; Formats: CD	—	
"—" denotes releases that did not chart

== Extended plays ==
Title	Album details	Peak positions
Title	Album details	US Country
Turn Me Loose	Release date: 1984; Label: RCA Records; Formats: LP, CD, cassette	64
I Gave You Everything I Had	Release date: October 17, 2025; Label: MCA Nashville; Formats: Music download	—
Secondhand Smoke	Release date: November 14, 2025; Label: MCA Nashville; Formats: Music download	—
Brown's Diner Bar	Release date: January 9, 2026; Label: MCA Nashville; Formats: Music download	—
Down at the Borderline	Release date: February 13, 2026; Label: MCA Nashville; Formats: Music download	—
Lonely's What I Do	Release date: March 13, 2026; Label: MCA Nashville; Formats: Music download	—
End of the Night	Release date: April 10, 2026; Label: MCA Nashville; Formats: Music download	—
Nobody Held Her Like Me	Release date: May 8, 2026; Label: MCA Nashville; Formats: Music download	—
A Mother's Prayer	Release date: June 12, 2026; Label: MCA Nashville; Formats: Music download	—
"—" denotes releases that did not chart

== Collaborative albums ==
Title	Album details
Here Today (David Grisman, Emory Gordy Jr., Herb Pedersen, Jim Buchanan, and Vince Gill)	Release date: 1983; Label: Rounder Records; Formats: LP, CD, cassette

== See also ==
- The Notorious Cherry Bombs
