= Icon (Vince Gill album) =

Greatest hits album by Vince Gill
- Released: August 31, 2010
- Genre: Country
- Length: 45:04
- Label: MCA Nashville
- Producer: Andy McKaie

Vince Gill chronology
These Days (2006)	Icon (2010)	Guitar Slinger (2011)

Icon is a greatest hits album by American country musician Vince Gill. It was released on August 31, 2010 by MCA Nashville, and contains select highlight songs from his career.

== Track listing ==
No.	Title	Writer(s)	Length
1.	"When I Call Your Name"	Vince Gill, Tim DuBois	4:14
2.	"Don't Let Our Love Start Slippin' Away"	Gill, Pete Wasner	3:44
3.	"I Still Believe in You"	Gill, John Barlow Jarvis	3:58
4.	"The Heart Won't Lie" (duet with Reba McEntire)	Kim Carnes, Donna T. Weiss	3:21
5.	"One More Last Chance"	Gill, Gary Nicholson	3:11
6.	"Tryin' to Get Over You"	Gill	3:45
7.	"What the Cowgirls Do"	Gill, Reed Nielsen	3:04
8.	"When Love Finds You"	Gill, Michael Omartian	4:04
9.	"Pretty Little Adriana"	Gill	3:47
10.	"If You Ever Have Forever in Mind"	Gill, Troy Seals	4:37
11.	"A Little More Love"	Gill	3:07
12.	"Feels Like Love"	Gill	4:13

== Critical reception ==
Stephen Thomas Erlewine, in his review for AllMusic, says the album is "a very good sampler of Vince Gill's biggest hits for MCA Nashville".

== Chart performance ==
Chart (2010)	Peak position
US Top Country Albums (Billboard)	51
