= Whenever You Come Around =

Single by Vince Gill

from the album When Love Finds You
- B-side: "South Side of Dixie"
- Released: April 11, 1994
- Recorded: 1993
- Genre: Country
- Length: 4:19
- Label: MCA
- Songwriters: Vince Gill, Pete Wasner
- Producer: Tony Brown

Vince Gill singles chronology
"Tryin' to Get Over You" (1994)	"Whenever You Come Around" (1994)	"What the Cowgirls Do" (1994)

"Whenever You Come Around" is a song co-written and recorded by American country music artist Vince Gill. It was released in April 1994 as the first single from the album When Love Finds You. The song reached number 2 on the Billboard Hot Country Singles & Tracks chart. It was written by Gill and Pete Wasner. The song was covered by Willie Nelson in 2014 for his Band of Brothers album.

== Cover versions ==
Country music singer Chris Stapleton covered the song from the television special CMT Giants: Vince Gill.

== Critical reception ==
Deborah Evans Price, of Billboard magazine reviewed the song favorably saying that the song is "beautifully written and impeccably performed."

== Commercial performance ==
"Whenever You Come Around" debuted at number 60 on the U.S. Billboard Hot Country Singles & Tracks for the week of April 16, 1994. The song has sold 207,000 digital copies as of March 2019 since it became available for download.

== Personnel ==
Compiled from the liner notes.

- Vince Gill – lead and backing vocals, electric guitar, electric guitar solo
- John Barlow Jarvis – synthesizer pads
- Tom Roady – percussion
- Randy Scruggs – acoustic guitar
- Steuart Smith – electric guitar
- Carlos Vega – drums
- Pete Wasner – keyboards
- Willie Weeks – bass guitar
- Trisha Yearwood – backing vocals

== Charts ==
Chart (1994)	Peak position
Canada Country Singles (RPM)	2
US Billboard Hot 100	72
US Hot Country Songs (Billboard)	2

=== Year-end charts ===
Chart (1994)	Position
Canada Country Tracks (RPM)	42
US Country Songs (Billboard)	12

== Certifications ==
Region	Certification	Certified units/sales
United States (RIAA)	Gold	500,000^{‡}
^{‡} Sales+streaming figures based on certification alone.
