= You Better Think Twice =

Single by Vince Gill

from the album When Love Finds You
- B-side: "A Real Lady's Man"
- Released: May 8, 1995
- Recorded: 1994
- Genre: Country
- Length: 3:28
- Label: MCA
- Songwriters: Vince Gill, Reed Nielsen
- Producer: Tony Brown

Vince Gill singles chronology
"Which Bridge to Cross (Which Bridge to Burn)" (1995)	"You Better Think Twice" (1995)	"Go Rest High on That Mountain" (1995)

"You Better Think Twice" is a song co-written and recorded by American country music artist Vince Gill. It was released in May 1995 as the fifth single from the album When Love Finds You. The song reached number 2 on the Billboard Hot Country Singles & Tracks chart, behind Shania Twain's "Any Man of Mine". It was written by Gill and Reed Nielsen.

== Critical reception ==
Deborah Evans Price, of Billboard magazine reviewed the song favorably saying that Gill continues to "pump out solid, if somewhat predictable, material like this guitar fueled country-rocker."

== Personnel ==
Compiled from the liner notes.

- Barry Beckett – piano additions
- Vince Gill – lead and backing vocals, electric guitar, electric guitar solo
- John Barlow Jarvis – piano
- Jonell Mosser – backing vocals
- Steve Nathan – Hammond B-3 organ, synthesizer
- Tom Roady – percussion
- Michael Rhodes – bass guitar
- Randy Scruggs – acoustic guitar
- Steuart Smith – electric guitar
- Billy Thomas – backing vocals
- Carlos Vega – drums
- Pete Wasner – keyboards

== Chart performance ==
"You Better Think Twice" debuted at number 63 on the U.S. Billboard Hot Country Singles & Tracks for the week of May 13, 1995.

Chart (1995)	Peak position
Canada Country Singles (RPM)	2
US Hot Country Songs (Billboard)	2

=== Year-end charts ===
Chart (1995)	Position
Canada Country Tracks (RPM)	17
US Country Songs (Billboard)	8
