= When Love Finds You =

Studio album by Vince Gill
- Released: June 7, 1994
- Recorded: 1993–1994
- Studio: Sound Stage Studios, Masterfonics and Woodland Studios (Nashville, Tennessee); Ocean Way Studios and A&M Studios (Hollywood, California); Mix This! (Pacific Palisades, California)
- Genre: Country
- Length: 45:12
- Label: MCA Nashville
- Producer: Tony Brown

Vince Gill chronology
Let There Be Peace on Earth (1993)	When Love Finds You (1994)	The Essential Vince Gill (1995)

Singles from When Love Finds You
- 1. "Whenever You Come Around" Released: April 11, 1994; 2. "What the Cowgirls Do" Released: July 4, 1994; 3. "When Love Finds You" Released: October 3, 1994; 4. "Which Bridge to Cross (Which Bridge to Burn)" Released: January 30, 1995; 5. "You Better Think Twice" Released: May 8, 1995; 6. "Go Rest High on That Mountain" Released: August 28, 1995

Professional ratings
Review scores
Source	Rating
AllMusic	link
Chicago Tribune	link
Entertainment Weekly	B+ link
Los Angeles Times	link
Q	link
Robert Christgau	link

When Love Finds You is the sixth studio album from American country music artist Vince Gill. It was released in 1994 on MCA Nashville. It features the singles "Whenever You Come Around," "What the Cowgirls Do," "When Love Finds You," "Which Bridge to Cross (Which Bridge to Burn)," "You Better Think Twice" and "Go Rest High on That Mountain."

== Track listing ==
No.	Title	Writer(s)	Length
1.	"Whenever You Come Around"	Vince Gill, Pete Wasner	4:19
2.	"You Better Think Twice"	Gill, Reed Nielsen	3:47
3.	"Real Lady's Man"	Gill, Carl Jackson	3:34
4.	"What the Cowgirls Do"	Gill, Nielsen	3:06
5.	"When Love Finds You"	Gill, Michael Omartian	4:05
6.	"If There's Anything I Can Do"	Gill, John Jarvis	3:48
7.	"South Side of Dixie"	Gill, Delbert McClinton	4:15
8.	"Maybe Tonight"	Gill, Janis Oliver	4:51
9.	"Which Bridge to Cross (Which Bridge to Burn)"	Bill Anderson, Gill	4:17
10.	"If I Had My Way"	Gill, Amy Grant	3:55
11.	"Go Rest High on That Mountain"	Gill	5:15 European Version Bonus Tracks
12.	"Ain't Nothing Like the Real Thing" (duet with Gladys Knight)	Valerie Simpson, Nickolas Ashford	3:53 ^{1}
13.	"I Can't Tell You Why"	Timothy B. Schmit, Don Henley, Glenn Frey	4:04 ^{2}

^{1} Produced by Tony Brown & Don Was – From Rhythm, Country and Blues

^{2} From Common Thread: The Songs of the Eagles

== Personnel ==
As listed in the liner notes.

- Vince Gill – vocals, backing vocals (1–10, 13), electric guitar (1, 2, 4–6, 8, 11), electric guitar solo (1, 2, 4–8, 11), acoustic guitar (8, 10), mandolin (8)
- John Barlow Jarvis – synthesizer pads (1), acoustic piano (2, 6, 8), Wurlitzer electronic piano (3), keyboards (4, 5), Hammond organ (7, 10, 11), electric piano (8)
- Pete Wasner – keyboards (1–3, 6–8, 10, 11), synthesizers (3, 9), acoustic piano (4, 11), Wurlitzer electronic piano (10, 13)
- Barry Beckett – acoustic piano additions (2)
- Steve Nathan – Hammond organ (2, 8, 13), synthesizers (2, 8, 13)
- Michael Omartian – acoustic piano (5), accordion (5), synthesizers (5)
- Matt Rollings – acoustic piano (9)
- Nat Adderley Jr. – acoustic piano (12)
- Benmont Tench – Hammond organ (12)
- Randy Scruggs – acoustic guitar (1–11)
- Steuart Smith – electric guitar (1–8, 10, 11), tic-tac electric guitar (3)
- Billy Joe Walker Jr. – electric guitar (9)
- Mark Goldenberg – acoustic guitar (12)
- Reggie Young – electric guitar (12)
- George Marinelli – electric guitar (13)
- John Hughey – steel guitar (3, 9, 11)
- Robby Turner – pedal steel guitar (12)
- Willie Weeks – bass guitar (1, 4–7, 9)
- Michael Rhodes – bass guitar (2, 3, 8, 10, 11)
- Freddie Washington – bass guitar (12)
- David Hungate – bass guitar (13)
- Carlos Vega – drums (1–8, 10, 11)
- Milton Sledge – drums (9, 13)
- Kenny Aronoff – drums (12)
- Tom Roady – percussion (1–8, 10, 11)
- Lenny Castro – percussion (12)
- Stuart Duncan – fiddle (3, 4, 9, 11)
- Jim Horn – soprano saxophone (13)
- David Campbell – string arrangements (12)
- Trisha Yearwood – backing vocals (1)
- Jonell Mosser – backing vocals (2)
- Billy Thomas – backing vocals (2, 4, 5, 7–10)
- Alison Krauss – backing vocals (3)
- Jeff White – backing vocals (5, 7–9)
- Michael McDonald – backing vocals (6)
- Dawn Sears – backing vocals (9)
- Amy Grant – backing vocals (10)
- Patty Loveless – backing vocals (11)
- Ricky Skaggs – backing vocals (11)
- Gladys Knight – duet vocals (12)
- Timothy B. Schmit – backing vocals (13)

== Production ==
- Tony Brown – producer
- Chuck Ainlay – recording, overdub recording
- Marty Williams – overdub recording
- Derek Bason – second engineer
- Tony Green – second engineer
- Graham Lewis – second engineer
- John Thomas II – second engineer
- Craig White – second engineer
- John Guess – mixing, mastering
- Glenn Meadows – mastering at Masterfonics
- Jessie Noble – project coordinator
- Virginia Team – art direction
- Jerry Joyner – design
- Naomi Kaltman – photography
- Cheryl Riddle – hair
- Mary Beth Felts – make-up
- Trish Townsend – stylist
- The Fitzgerald Hartley Co. – management

Production credits from European release (Tracks 12 & 13)

- Don Was – producer (12)
- Tony Brown – producer (12, 13)
- Rik Pekkonen – recording (12)
- Steve Marcantonio – engineer (13)
- Dan Bosworth – recording assistant (12)
- Russ Martin – assistant engineer (13)
- Bob Clearmountain – mixing (12)
- John Guess – mixing (13)
- Doug Sax – mastering (12) at The Mastering Lab (Hollywood, California)

== Charts ==
=== Weekly charts ===
Chart (1994)	Peak position
Canadian Albums (RPM)	18
Canadian Country Albums (RPM)	2
US Billboard 200	6
US Top Country Albums (Billboard)	2

=== Year-end charts ===
Chart (1994)	Position
US Billboard 200	77
US Top Country Albums (Billboard)	11

Chart (1995)	Position
US Billboard 200	92
US Top Country Albums (Billboard)	15

== Certifications ==
Region	Certification	Certified units/sales
United States (RIAA)	4× Platinum	4,000,000^{^}
^{^} Shipments figures based on certification alone.
