= Which Bridge to Cross (Which Bridge to Burn) =

Single by Vince Gill

from the album When Love Finds You
- B-side: "If There's Anything I Can Do"
- Released: January 30, 1995
- Recorded: 1994
- Genre: Country
- Length: 4:17
- Label: MCA
- Songwriters: Vince Gill, Bill Anderson
- Producer: Tony Brown

Vince Gill singles chronology
| "When Love Finds You" (1994) | "Which Bridge to Cross (Which Bridge to Burn)" (1995) | "You Better Think Twice" (1995) |

"Which Bridge to Cross (Which Bridge to Burn)" is a song co-written and recorded by American country music artist Vince Gill. It was released in January 1995 as the fourth single from the album When Love Finds You. The song reached number 4 on the Billboard Hot Country Singles & Tracks chart. It was written by Gill and Bill Anderson.

== Critical reception ==
Deborah Evans Price, of Billboard magazine reviewed the song favorably calling it a "classic slow country waltz." She goes on to say that the song "makes optimum use of those classic changes and raises the chill bumps at every turn."

== Personnel ==
Compiled from the liner notes.

- Stuart Duncan – fiddle
- Vince Gill – lead and backing vocals
- John Hughey – steel guitar
- Matt Rollings – piano
- Randy Scruggs – acoustic guitar
- Dawn Sears – backing vocals
- Milton Sledge – drums
- Billy Thomas – backing vocals
- Billy Joe Walker Jr. – electric guitar
- Pete Wasner – synthesizer
- Willie Weeks – bass guitar
- Jeff White – backing vocals

== Chart performance ==
"Which Bridge to Cross (Which Bridge to Burn) debuted at number 61 on the U.S. Billboard Hot Country Singles & Tracks for the week of February 4, 1995.

| Chart (1995) | Peak position |
|---|---|
| Canada Country Singles (RPM) | 3 |
| US Hot Country Songs (Billboard) | 4 |

=== Year-end charts ===
| Chart (1995) | Position |
|---|---|
| Canada Country Tracks (RPM) | 86 |
