= Let There Be Peace on Earth (album) =

Studio album by Vince Gill
- Released: September 14, 1993
- Studio: Javelina Studios and Masterfonics (Nashville, Tennessee)
- Genre: Country
- Length: 39:47
- Label: MCA Nashville
- Producer: Tony Brown

Vince Gill chronology
I Still Believe in You (1992)	Let There Be Peace on Earth (1993)	When Love Finds You (1994)

Professional ratings
Review scores
Source	Rating
AllMusic	2/5 stars
Entertainment Weekly	C−
Los Angeles Times	1.5/4 stars

Let There Be Peace on Earth is the first Christmas album from American country music artist Vince Gill. It was released in 1993 on MCA Nashville. "Have Yourself a Merry Little Christmas," one of the album's tracks, peaked at #54 on the Billboard Hot Country Singles & Tracks chart.

Though panned by music critics, the album had broad appeal to the public. It reached No. 1 on the U.S. Billboard Top Holiday Albums for 1993, eventually going Double Platinum. The album had sold 1,787,000 copies as of December 2012.

== Track listing ==
No.	Title	Writer(s)	Length
1.	"Do You Hear What I Hear?"	Noël Regney; Gloria Shayne Baker	4:39
2.	"Have Yourself a Merry Little Christmas"	Ralph Blane; Hugh Martin	4:02
3.	"One Bright Star (This Christmas Night)"	John Barlow Jarvis	3:37
4.	"What Child Is This?"	William Chatterton Dix	3:29
5.	"Santa Claus Is Coming to Town" (Instrumental)	John Frederick Coots; Haven Gillespie	2:37
6.	"I'll Be Home for Christmas"	Kim Gannon; Walter Kent; Buck Ram	4:34
7.	"Let There Be Peace on Earth" (duet with Jenny Gill)	Jill Jackson; Sy Miller	4:33
8.	"White Christmas"	Irving Berlin	4:40
9.	"Til the Season Comes Around Again"	Randy Goodrum; Jarvis	4:11
10.	"It Won't Be the Same This Year"	Vince Gill	3:43
Total length:			40:05

== Personnel ==
As listed in liner notes.

- Vince Gill – vocals, acoustic guitar, electric guitar
- John Barlow Jarvis – acoustic piano, Yamaha DX7, synthesizers
- Shane Keister – acoustic piano, Hammond B3 organ, synthesizers
- Steve Gibson – acoustic guitar, electric guitar
- Dean Parks – acoustic guitar, electric guitar
- John Hughey – steel guitar
- Leland Sklar – bass
- Carlos Vega – drums
- Tom Roady – percussion
- Stuart Duncan – fiddle
- Charlie McCoy – mouth harp
- Marty Paich – string arrangements and conductor (1, 3, 4, 6, 7), vocal arrangements and conductor (3, 6, 7)
- Bob Bailey – backing vocals
- Kim Fleming – backing vocals
- Donna McElroy – backing vocals
- Jamie Robbins – backing vocals
- Chris Rodriguez – backing vocals
- The Gene Merlino Singers: Gene Merlino, John Bahler, Dick Bolks, Amick Byram, Melissa Mackay, Myrna Matthews, Bobbi Page and Sally Stevens – additional backing vocals (3, 6, 7)
- Jenny Gill – vocals (7)

== Production ==
- Tony Brown – producer
- John Guess – recording, mixing, mastering
- Marty Williams – overdub recording, second recording engineer, second mix engineer
- Derek Bason – second mix engineer
- Robert Charles – second overdub engineer
- Glenn Meadows – mastering
- Jessie Noble – project coordinator
- Jim Kemp – art direction
- Katherine DeVault – art direction, design
- Victoria Pearson – photography
- Fitzgerald Hartley Co. – management

== Charts ==
=== Weekly charts ===
Chart (1993)	Peak position
Canadian Country Albums (RPM)	26
US Billboard 200	14
US Top Country Albums (Billboard)	3
US Top Holiday Albums (Billboard)	1

=== Year-end charts ===
Chart (1994)	Position
US Top Country Albums (Billboard)	19

== Certifications ==
Region	Certification	Certified units/sales
Canada (Music Canada)	Gold	50,000^{^}
United States (RIAA)	2× Platinum	2,000,000^{^}
^{^} Shipments figures based on certification alone.
