= Go Rest High on That Mountain =

Single by Vince Gill

from the album When Love Finds You
- B-side: "Maybe Tonight"
- Released: August 28, 1995
- Recorded: 1994
- Genre: Country
- Length: 5:15 (Album version); 4:27 (Radio edit)
- Label: MCA Nashville
- Songwriter: Vince Gill
- Producer: Tony Brown

Vince Gill singles chronology
"You Better Think Twice" (1995)	"Go Rest High on That Mountain" (1995)	"High Lonesome Sound" (1996)

"Go Rest High on That Mountain" is a song written and recorded by American country music artist Vince Gill. It was released in August 1995 as the sixth single from his album When Love Finds You. It is a eulogic ballad. Gill began writing the song following the death of country music singer Keith Whitley in 1989. Gill did not finish the song until a few years later following the death of his older brother Bob of a heart attack in 1993. Ricky Skaggs and Patty Loveless both sang background vocals on the record.

In 2026, "Go Rest High on That Mountain" was selected by the Library of Congress for preservation in the National Recording Registry for its "cultural, historical or aesthetic importance in the nation's recorded sound heritage."

== Content ==
"Go Rest High on That Mountain" is a tribute to Vince Gill's step brother who died shortly before the song was composed. It is composed in the key of D major with a slow tempo, largely following the chord pattern D-G-D-A-D.

Gill added a third verse in December 2019 saying “Yeah, it doesn’t make much sense, does it?” he told People. “Yeah, ‘Leave it alone, you idiot!’ That should be my mantra. But in my heart, I think this makes it better.”

== Cover versions ==
Country music singer Carrie Underwood covered the song from the television special CMT Giants: Vince Gill.

== Critical reception ==
Deborah Evans Price of Billboard magazine reviewed the song favorably calling the song "beautiful, majestic, and easily one of the best singles of Gill's already distinguished career." She goes on to say that the composition "boasts a touching spiritual lyric and Gill's consistently impeccable vocal delivery." In 2019, Rolling Stone ranked "Go Rest High on That Mountain" No. 17 on its list of the 40 Saddest Country Songs of All Time.

The song won the CMA's Song of the Year award in 1996 and a BMI Most-Performed Song award in 1997. It also received two Grammy Awards for Best Male Country Vocal Performance and Best Country Song in the 38th Grammy Awards. The single reached No. 14 on the Country Singles chart in 1995. It has sold 857,000 digital copies in the US since becoming available for download.

In 2003, the song ranked #60 on CMT's 100 Greatest Songs in Country Music.

== Music video ==
The music video was directed by John Lloyd Miller and premiered in mid-1995. Filmed at the Ryman Auditorium in downtown Nashville, it features Gill performing the song (accompanied by Loveless and Skaggs on the choruses) while images of nature such as mountains, forests, and sunrises play on screens behind him.

== George Jones eulogy ==
On May 2, 2013, Gill performed the song with Loveless at the funeral of fellow country artist George Jones. At one point during the performance, Gill became too emotional to sing some of the words, but was able to complete the song by focusing primarily on his guitar playing, with Loveless stepping up to complete the back-up vocals and harmony. In a speech just prior to Gill's and Loveless' performance, Gill underlined their duet by stating that he always was aware of a "special anointing" in his duets with Loveless, and compared them particularly to Jones' duets with singer Melba Montgomery during the 1960s.

== 77th Primetime Emmy Awards ==
Thirty years after the initial release, on September 14, 2025, Gill performed the extended version with the third verse with Lainey Wilson at the 77th Primetime Emmy Awards for the "In Memoriam" segment, a tribute to the TV industry's recently departed stars.

== Personnel ==
Compiled from the liner notes.

- Stuart Duncan – fiddle
- Vince Gill – lead vocals, electric guitar, electric guitar solo
- John Hughey – steel guitar
- John Barlow Jarvis – Hammond B-3 organ
- Patty Loveless – backing vocals
- Tom Roady – percussion
- Michael Rhodes – bass guitar
- Randy Scruggs – acoustic guitar
- Ricky Skaggs – backing vocals
- Steuart Smith – electric guitar
- Carlos Vega – drums
- Pete Wasner – keyboards, piano

== Chart performance ==
"Go Rest High on That Mountain" debuted at number 70 on the U.S. Billboard Hot Country Singles & Tracks for the week of September 2, 1995, and hit the Christian Top 40 through a release with Rick Hendrix Music. The song has sold 857,000 digital copies as of November 2019 after it became available for download in the U.S.

Chart (1995)	Peak position
Canada Country Singles (RPM)	7
US Hot Country Songs (Billboard)	14

=== Year-end charts ===
Chart (1995)	Position
Canada Country Tracks (RPM)	74

== Certifications ==
Region	Certification	Certified units/sales
United States (RIAA)	2× Platinum	2,000,000^{‡}
^{‡} Sales+streaming figures based on certification alone.

== See also ==
- Vince Gill discography
