= Breath of Heaven: A Christmas Collection =

Studio album by Vince Gill
- Released: September 8, 1998
- Studio: Capitol Studios (Hollywood, California); Seventeen Grand Recording (Nashville, Tennessee)
- Genre: Country
- Length: 42:16
- Label: MCA Nashville
- Producer: Tony Brown; Michael Omartian

Vince Gill chronology
The Key (1998)	Breath of Heaven: A Christmas Collection (1998)	Let's Make Sure We Kiss Goodbye (2000)

Professional ratings
Review scores
Source	Rating
AllMusic	4/5 stars
Entertainment Weekly	C+
Los Angeles Times	3/4 stars

Breath of Heaven: A Christmas Collection is the second Christmas album from American country music artist Vince Gill. It was released in 1998 on MCA Nashville. The album was recorded with the Patrick Williams Orchestra.

== Track listing ==
1. "Winter Wonderland" (Felix Bernard, Richard B. Smith) - 3:21
2. "The Christmas Song" (Mel Torme, Bob Wells) - 4:16
3. "O Little Town of Bethlehem" (Phillips Brooks, Lewis Redner) - 4:06
4. "Silver Bells" (Ray Evans, Jay Livingston) - 3:32
5. "It's the Most Wonderful Time of the Year" (Edward Pola, George Wyle) - 2:45
6. "Blue Christmas" (Billy Hayes, Jay W. Johnson) - 3:48
7. "O Holy Night" (Adolphe Adam, John Sullivan Dwight) - 4:34
8. "Let It Snow! Let It Snow! Let It Snow!" (Sammy Cahn, Jule Styne) - 2:48
9. "A Cradle in Bethlehem" (Alfred Bryan, Larry Stock) - 4:12
10. "Breath of Heaven (Mary's Song)" (Chris Eaton, Amy Grant) - 5:57
11. "O Come All Ye Faithful" (Frederick Oakeley, John Francis Wade) - 2:57

== Personnel ==
- Vince Gill – vocals
- Michael Lang – acoustic piano
- Michael Omartian – keyboards, percussion
- George Doering – guitars
- Dean Parks – guitars
- Chuck Berghofer – bass
- Gregg Field – drums
- Larry Bunker – percussion
- Gene Puerling – arrangements (3)
- Patrick Williams – arrangements (7, 11)

The Patrick Williams Orchestra

- Patrick Williams – arrangements and conductor
- Joe Soldo – orchestra manager
- Bill Baker, Curt Berg, Jonathan Barrack Griffiths, Clyde Hoggan, Ralph Mullins, Daniel Perito, Marion Sherrill, David Wells and Terry Woodson – music preparation

Brass and woodwind section

- Jon Clarke – flute, oboe
- Gary Foster – clarinet, flute
- David Shostac – flute
- Angela Wiegand – flute
- Barbara Northcutt – oboe
- Phil Teele – bass trombone
- Charles Loper – trombone
- Bill Watrous – trombone
- Chauncey Welsch – trombone
- Rick Baptist– trumpet
- Wayne Bergeron – trumpet
- Larry Hall– trumpet
- Warren Luening – trumpet

String section

- Endre Granat – concertmaster
- Matthew Cooker – cello
- Steve Erdody – cello
- Armin Ksajikian – cello
- Christina Soule – cello
- David Speltz – cello
- Cecilia Tsan – cello
- Donald V. Ferrone – double bass
- Oscar Hidalgo – double bass
- Julie Berghofer – harp
- Marcia Dickstein – harp
- Bob Becker – viola
- Suzanna Giordano – viola
- Mimi Granat – viola
- Keith Greene – viola
- Laura Kuennen-Poper – viola
- John Scanlon – viola
- Harry Shirinian – viola
- Ray Tischer – viola
- Robert Brosseau – violin
- Belinda Broughton – violin
- Darius Campo – violin
- Mario DeLeón – violin
- Assa Drori – violin
- Kristin Fife – violin
- Ronald Folsom – violin
- Larry Greenfield – violin
- Gwenn Heller – violin
- Amy Hershberger – violin
- Sarah Knutson – violin
- Natalie Leggett – violin
- Carolyn Osborn – violin
- Bob Sanov – violin
- David Stenske – violin
- Jennifer Walton – violin
- Miwako Watanabe – violin

Backing vocalists

- Steve Amerson – backing vocals (3)
- Morgan Ames – backing vocals (3)
- Amick Byram – backing vocals (3, 9, 11)
- Alvin Chea – backing vocals (3, 11)
- Randy Crenshaw – backing vocals (9, 11)
- Donna Davidson – backing vocals (3, 7, 9, 11)
- Ian Freebarin-Smith – backing vocals (3)
- Debbie Hall – backing vocals (3, 7, 9, 11)
- Sandie Hall – backing vocals (3, 7, 9, 11)
- Walt Harrah – backing vocals (3, 11)
- Terry Harriton – backing vocals (3)
- Ron Hicklin – backing vocals (3)
- Bob Joyce – backing vocals (3, 9, 11)
- Edie Lehmann-Boddicker – backing vocals (3, 7, 9, 11)
- Melissa Mackay – backing vocals (3, 7, 9, 11)
- Gene Merlino – backing vocals (3)
- Bobbi Page – backing vocals (3)
- Don Shelton – backing vocals (3, 9, 11)
- Sally Stevens – backing vocals (3, 7, 9, 11), vocal contractor
- Mervyn Warren – backing vocals (3, 11)
- John West – backing vocals (3, 9, 11)
- Ann White – backing vocals (3)
- Luana Jackman – backing vocals (7, 9, 11)
- Susie Stevens-Logan – backing vocals (7, 9, 11)
- Rick Logan – backing vocals (9, 11)

== Production ==
- Tony Brown – producer
- Michael Omartian – producer
- Al Schmitt – recording, mixing
- Terry Christian – overdub recording, additional recording
- Hank Nirider – additional overdub recording, assistant engineer
- Peter Doell – assistant engineer
- Steve Genewick – assistant engineer
- Bill Smith – assistant engineer
- Denny Purcell – mastering at Georgetown Masters (Nashville, Tennessee)
- Jessie Noble – project coordinator for Tony Brown
- Lisa Jurkowski – project coordinator for Patrick Williams
- Jim "Señor" McGuire – photography
- Trish Townsend – stylist
- Mary Beth Felts – hair, make-up
- Fitzgerald Hartley Co. – management

== Charts ==
=== Weekly charts ===
Chart (1998)	Peak position
US Billboard 200	39
US Top Country Albums (Billboard)	6
US Top Holiday Albums (Billboard)	3

=== Year-end charts ===
Chart (1999)	Position
US Top Country Albums (Billboard)	26

== Certifications ==
Region	Certification	Certified units/sales
United States (RIAA)	Platinum	1,000,000^{^}
^{^} Shipments figures based on certification alone.
