= When Love Finds You (song) =

Single by Vince Gill

from the album When Love Finds You
- B-side: "If I Had My Way"
- Released: October 3, 1994
- Recorded: 1994
- Genre: Country
- Length: 4:05
- Label: MCA
- Songwriters: Vince Gill, Michael Omartian
- Producer: Tony Brown

Vince Gill singles chronology
"What the Cowgirls Do" (1994)	"When Love Finds You" (1994)	"Which Bridge to Cross (Which Bridge to Burn)" (1995)

"When Love Finds You" is a song co-written and recorded by American country music artist Vince Gill. It was released in October 1994 as third single and title track from the album When Love Finds You. The song reached number 3 on the Billboard Hot Country Singles & Tracks chart. It was written by Gill and Michael Omartian.

== Music video ==
The music video was directed by John Lloyd Miller and premiered in late 1994.

== Personnel ==
Complied from the liner notes.

- Vince Gill – lead and backing vocals, electric guitar solo
- John Barlow Jarvis – keyboards
- Michael Omartian – accordion, piano, synthesizer
- Tom Roady – percussion
- Randy Scruggs – acoustic guitar
- Steuart Smith – electric guitar
- Billy Thomas – backing vocals
- Carlos Vega – drums
- Willie Weeks – bass guitar
- Jeff White – backing vocals

== Chart performance ==
"When Love Finds You" debuted at number 58 on the U.S. Billboard Hot Country Singles & Tracks for the week of October 15, 1994.

Chart (1994)	Peak position
Canada Country Singles (RPM)	5
US Bubbling Under Hot 100 (Billboard)	9
US Hot Country Songs (Billboard)	3
