= What the Cowgirls Do =

Single by Vince Gill

from the album When Love Finds You
- B-side: "Go Rest High on That Mountain"
- Released: July 4, 1994
- Recorded: 1993
- Genre: Country
- Length: 3:03
- Label: MCA
- Songwriters: Vince Gill, Reed Nielsen
- Producer: Tony Brown

Vince Gill singles chronology
"Whenever You Come Around" (1994)	"What the Cowgirls Do" (1994)	"When Love Finds You" (1994)

"What the Cowgirls Do" is a song co-written and recorded by American country music artist Vince Gill. It was released in July 1994 as the second single from the album When Love Finds You. The song reached number 2 on the Billboard Hot Country Singles & Tracks chart. It was written by Gill and Reed Nielsen and features lead guitar from Gill and session guitarist Steuart Smith.

== Critical reception ==
Deborah Evans Price, of Billboard magazine reviewed the song favorably saying that it contains an "effortless groove and Gill's snappy Telecaster licks."

== Music video ==
The music video was directed by John Lloyd Miller and premiered in July 1994. It featured appearances by Calvert DeForest, Little Jimmy Dickens and Rodney Crowell.

== Personnel ==
Compiled from the liner notes.

- Stuart Duncan – fiddle
- Vince Gill – lead and backing vocals, electric guitar, electric guitar solo
- John Barlow Jarvis – keyboards
- Tom Roady – percussion
- Randy Scruggs – acoustic guitar
- Steuart Smith – electric guitar
- Billy Thomas – backing vocals
- Carlos Vega – drums
- Pete Wasner – piano
- Willie Weeks – bass guitar

== Chart performance ==
"What the Cowgirls Do" debuted at number 71 on the U.S. Billboard Hot Country Singles & Tracks for the week of July 9, 1994.

Chart (1994)	Peak position
Canada Country Singles (RPM)	1
US Hot Country Songs (Billboard)	2

=== Year-end charts ===
Chart (1994)	Position
Canada Country Tracks (RPM)	6
US Country Songs (Billboard)	8
