= Vince Gill =

American musician (born 1957)

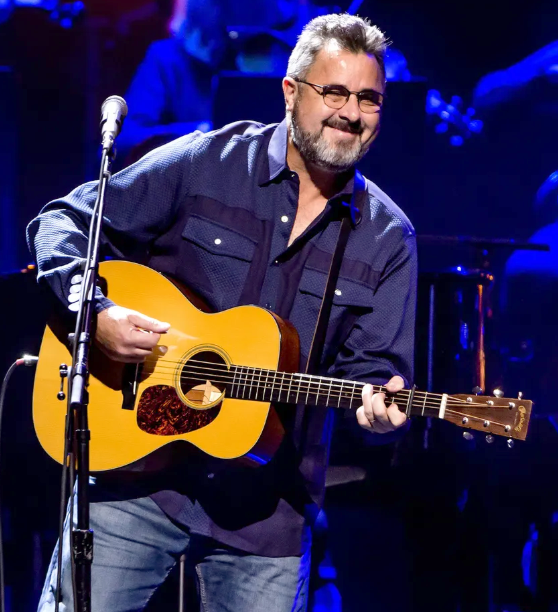
- Gill performing live with the Eagles in February 2019

Background information
- Born: Vincent Grant Gill; April 12, 1957 (age 69); Norman, Oklahoma, U.S.
- Origin: Nashville, Tennessee, U.S.
- Genres: Neotraditional country; bluegrass; rock
- Occupations: Singer, songwriter, musician
- Instruments: Vocals; guitar
- Works: Albums; singles
- Years active: 1976–present
- Labels: RCA Nashville; MCA Nashville
- Member of: Eagles
- Formerly of: Mountain Smoke; Sundance; Pure Prairie League; The Notorious Cherry Bombs; The Time Jumpers
- Spouses: Janis Oliver (m. 1980; div. 1997) Amy Grant (m. 2000)
- Website: Vince Gill

Vincent Grant Gill (born April 12, 1957) is an American singer, songwriter, and musician. He played in a number of local bluegrass bands in the 1970s, and from 1978 to 1982, he achieved his first mainstream attention after taking over as lead singer of the soft rock band Pure Prairie League. Gill sang lead on their hit single "Let Me Love You Tonight" in addition to writing several of their songs. After leaving Pure Prairie League, Gill briefly played guitar in Rodney Crowell's backing band the Cherry Bombs before beginning a solo career in country music in 1984. Gill recorded for RCA Records Nashville from then until 1988 with minimal success. A year later he signed with MCA Nashville, the label for which he has recorded ever since.

Gill's commercial peak came in the first half of the 1990s, starting with his breakthrough album When I Call Your Name. He has made 65 entries on the Billboard country music charts, including four solo number one hits: "I Still Believe in You", "Don't Let Our Love Start Slippin' Away", "One More Last Chance", and "Tryin' to Get Over You", all between 1992 and 1994. He has also had number-one singles as a guest on Reba McEntire's "The Heart Won't Lie" in 1993, and Chris Young's "Sober Saturday Night" and the multi-artist collaboration "Forever Country", both in 2016. All of Gill's albums released in the 1990s were certified platinum or higher by the Recording Industry Association of America (RIAA), with I Still Believe in You (1992) his highest, at quintuple-platinum. Gill has won 22 Grammy Awards, the most among solo male country music artists.

Gill was a member of Western swing group the Time Jumpers from 2010 to 2020, and joined the rock band Eagles in 2017 following the death of founding member Glenn Frey. He has also participated in a variety of collaborations, including songs by Patty Loveless, Brooks & Dunn, Kelly Clarkson, and Maren Morris. Additionally, Gill has written songs for Alabama and Ty Herndon, and holds a number of credits as a backing vocalist and session musician. From 1980 to 1997, he was married to Janis Oliver, one-half of the country duo Sweethearts of the Rodeo; after they divorced, he married contemporary Christian music singer Amy Grant in 2000.

Gill is known for his songwriting, his tenor singing voice, and his lead guitar work, with many critics noting his proficiency in both emotional ballads and uptempo material. He plays guitar, mandolin, banjo, and Dobro.

== Early life ==
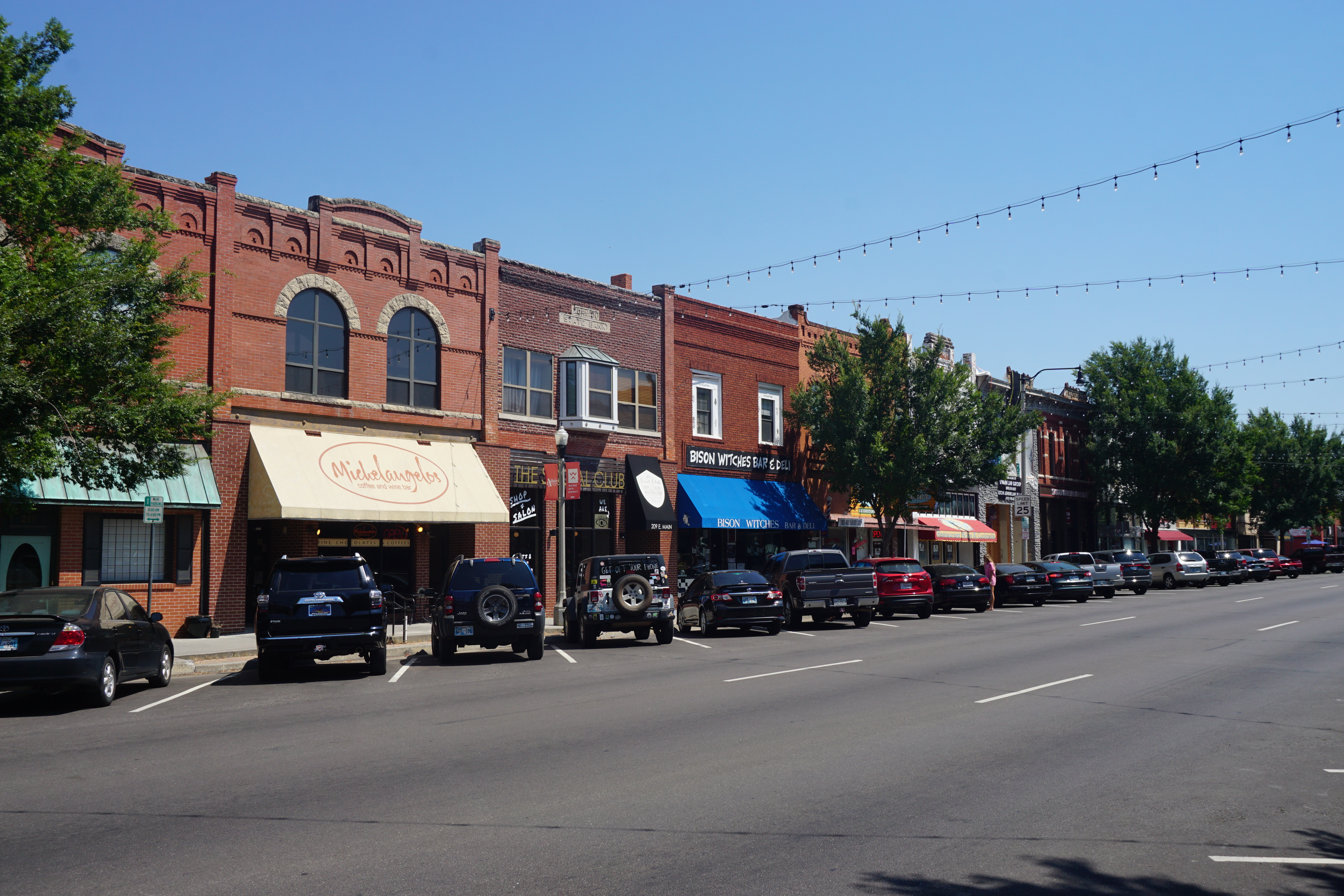
Gill was born in Norman, Oklahoma.

Vincent Grant Gill was born April 12, 1957, in Norman, Oklahoma, as the youngest of three children to Jerene and Stan Gill. Stan Gill was a judge who also played guitar and banjo, both of which he taught his son how to play. Jerene also sang and played harmonica. The Gill family often listened to the Grand Ole Opry on the radio, as well as contemporary rock and roll artists. Both parents also enjoyed golf, a pastime that Gill himself would develop as well. As a child, Gill began playing a guitar his grandmother owned, and learned how to play "Old Shep" on it when he was five years old; three years later, he and his half-brother Bob played the Beach Boys' "Long Tall Texan" on a local radio show. Gill also took guitar lessons from a local guitarist named J. Julian Akins. Additionally, Gill brought his guitar to school for show and tell a number of times, where he would entertain students by playing "The House of the Rising Sun". Gill also learned how to play Dobro, fiddle, banjo, mandolin, and bass guitar during his teenage years.

He developed an interest in bluegrass music after becoming friends with the son of his father's friend, who was a fan of the genre and also played mandolin. After graduating from high school, Gill founded his own bluegrass band called Mountain Smoke, which opened for the hard rock band Kiss at a concert on March 4, 1976. According to Gill, the crowd began booing and throwing objects on the stage during Mountain Smoke's set, to which he responded by flipping the bird and mooning them before leaving the stage. After Mountain Smoke disbanded, Gill moved to the state of Kentucky. There he played in the bands Bluegrass Alliance and Boone Creek, the latter of which also featured Ricky Skaggs as a member. Later in 1976, he moved to Los Angeles, California, where he briefly joined fiddle player Byron Berline's backing band, Sundance.

== Music career ==
=== Early 1980s: Pure Prairie League and the Cherry Bombs ===
In 1978, soft rock band Pure Prairie League was auditioning for new lead singers after their previous vocalist Larry Goshorn departed. Gill attended the auditions at the recommendation of a friend, as he had served as an opening act for the band while in Mountain Smoke. By October 1978, Gill had begun performing in concert as guitarist and vocalist for Pure Prairie League. He appeared on their 1979 album Can't Hold Back in addition to writing several songs on it. During Gill's tenure as lead vocalist, the band had a top-ten hit on the Billboard Hot 100 with "Let Me Love You Tonight"; he also wrote its follow-up "I'm Almost Ready", as well as five other songs on the corresponding album Firin' Up. Of this album, Joe Viglione of AllMusic thought that Gill's contributions to the album were "highly entertaining" and showed more of a country pop and adult contemporary influence than his later works. By comparison, Jim Worbois wrote of Can't Hold Back on the same site, "By this time, they are [Pure Prairie League] in name only as there is no resemblance between this and the original band." Overall, Gill recorded three albums as lead singer of Pure Prairie League.

In 1982, Gill was invited by singer Rodney Crowell to play guitar in his backing band, the Cherry Bombs. Gill had previously been offered the opportunity to do so during the success of "Let Me Love You Tonight" and declined, but chose to accept Crowell's offer the second time because the following singles and albums had not been successful. As a result, he quit Pure Prairie League and was replaced by Gary Burr. His role as guitarist in the Cherry Bombs also led to him briefly playing guitar for Crowell's then-wife, Rosanne Cash. Because of these roles, Gill moved to Nashville, Tennessee, a year later.

=== 1983–1988: Beginning of solo career ===
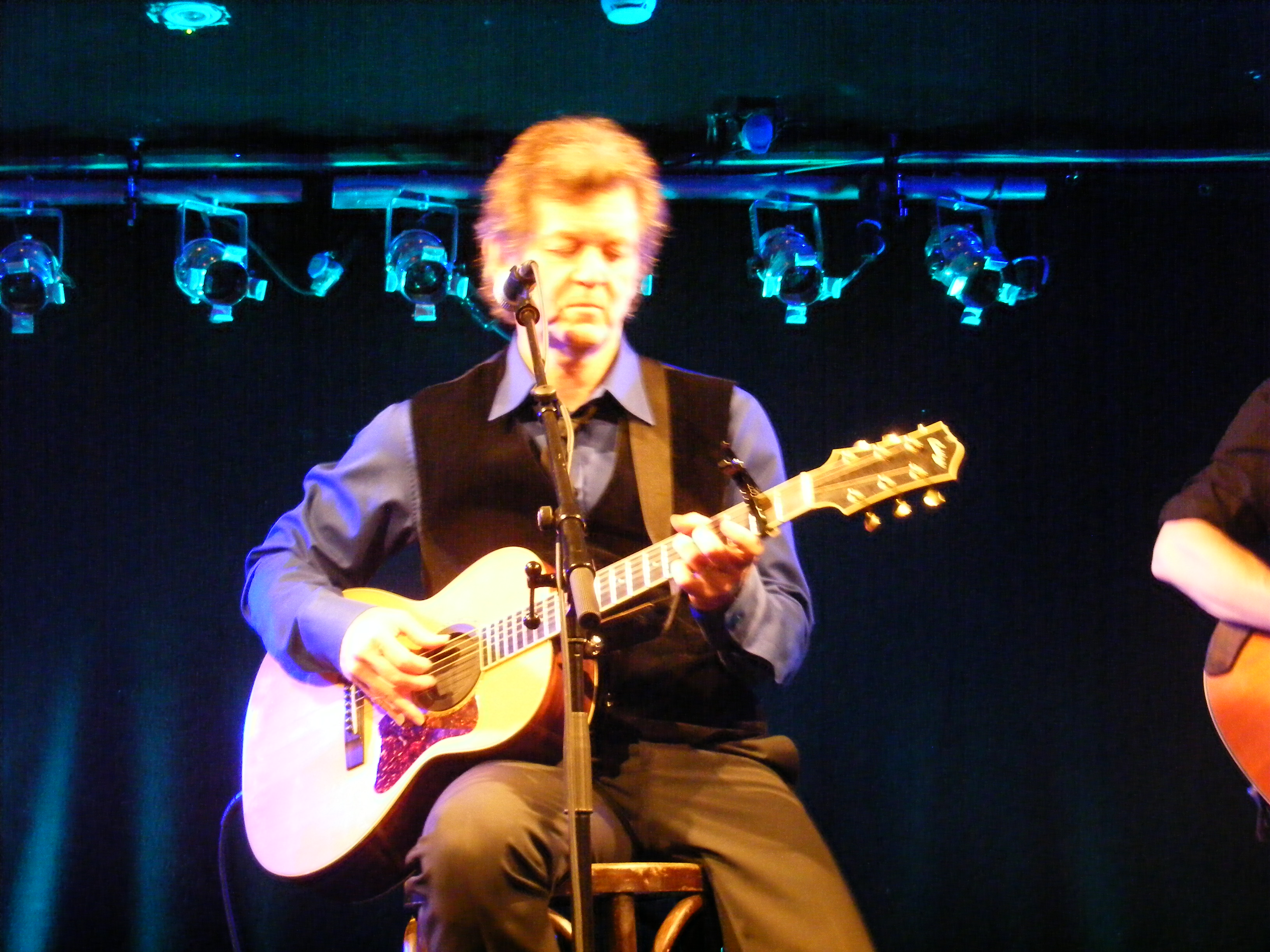
Gill is a former backing musician for Rodney Crowell, pictured in 2009.

Another member of the Cherry Bombs, keyboardist and record producer Tony Brown, became the president of artists and repertoire at RCA Records Nashville in 1983. As Gill wanted to become a solo artist, Brown recommended him to Joe Galante, then an executive of the same label, who signed him that same year. Shortly before his signing with RCA, Gill also appeared as a guest vocalist on David Grisman's Here Today, and sang backing vocals on Steve Wariner's "Midnight Fire", on which Brown was a producer.

Gill debuted on RCA in 1984 with a six-song extended play titled Turn Me Loose. The project accounted for three singles on the Billboard Hot Country Singles (now Hot Country Songs) charts: "Victim of Life's Circumstances", "Oh Carolina", and the title track, all of which peaked just within the top 40. Delbert McClinton wrote the former of these, while Gill wrote the title track. The album was produced by Emory Gordy Jr., also a member of the Cherry Bombs at the time. Following the album's release, Gill won Top New Male Vocalist from the Academy of Country Music in 1984. Word of mouth within the Nashville community towards Gill's extended play also led to him serving as a backing vocalist and session musician for a number of other country singers. He served in this capacity for Conway Twitty and Lee Greenwood, in addition to providing backing vocals on Rosanne Cash's 1985 album Rhythm & Romance.

After Turn Me Loose, Gill performed a number of shows at Nashville's Bluebird Café, a popular venue for songwriters, as a means of refining his own songwriting. His first full album for RCA was 1985's The Things That Matter. While the lead single "True Love" underperformed on the Billboard country charts, the follow-up "If It Weren't for Him" (a duet with Cash) became Gill's first top-ten country hit the same year. This song was originally to have been included on Turn Me Loose, but was delayed until The Things That Matter due to legal complications between Gill's and Cash's labels. The Things That Matter accounted for another top-ten in "Oklahoma Borderline", which Gill wrote with Crowell and Guy Clark. "With You", the final single, was less successful. To promote the album, Gill began touring as an opening act for Ricky Skaggs.

Author Jo Sgammato stated that while Gill's first two projects for RCA were not commercially successful, both were well-received by music critics and fans. For his third RCA release, The Way Back Home (1987), Gill wanted to choose a new producer to vary his sound. He selected Richard Landis, who had previously worked with Juice Newton. Gill recalled Landis as being "outspoken" and initially thought Landis would make a "slick pop record", but ultimately noted that Landis was open to production suggestions from Gill. In particular, Landis allowed Gill to play mandolin, banjo, and Dobro, as well as guitar. Crowell provided backing vocals, as did Sweethearts of the Rodeo, a duo consisting of Gill's then-wife Janis and her sister Kristine. The Way Back Home produced four singles. First was "Cinderella", written by Reed Nielsen, which peaked at number five on the United States country music charts in 1987. The album's second and third singles "Let's Do Something" and "Everybody's Sweetheart" were both top-20 hits, but the final single "The Radio" stopped at number 39 on Billboard's country music charts. After this album, Gill ended his contract with RCA as Galante wanted him to record only songs by other writers. Sgammato believed this decision was made because most of Gill's songs had not been as successful as those written by others. Despite this disagreement, Gill stated that he left RCA amicably and still considered Galante a friend. During Gill's departure from RCA, Dire Straits guitarist Mark Knopfler invited Gill to join the band on their then-upcoming world tour, but Gill declined as he wanted to stay within country music.

=== 1989–1992: Early years with MCA Nashville ===
Gill had remained in contact with Tony Brown, who by 1988 was president of MCA Nashville Records and helped him sign a contract with that label in 1989. Brown would also go on to serve as Gill's producer throughout the entirety of the 1990s. Of their relationship, Brown stated that he considered himself more of a "coach" due to his perception of Gill's artistic identity. Brown also chose to put more emphasis on Gill's vocals by mixing them more prominently than the instruments; previously, both Gordy and Landis had mixed the instruments more prominently due to Gill's lack of confidence at the time over his singing ability. His first single release for MCA was "Never Alone", previously recorded by Cash on Rhythm & Romance and co-written by both of them. This was the first of four singles off his MCA debut When I Call Your Name, considered by the editors of The Encyclopedia of Country Music to be Gill's breakthrough album. When I Call Your Name featured a large number of backing vocalists, including Kathie Baillie (of Baillie & the Boys), Patty Loveless, Emmylou Harris, and Herb Pedersen. The second single from the album was "Oklahoma Swing", a duet with Reba McEntire. This charted within the top 20 in early 1990, with Sgammato noting that some stations refused to play the song due to its Western swing sound. It was followed by the number two title track and number three "Never Knew Lonely" by year's end. "When I Call Your Name" also received a music video. AllMusic writer Thom Jurek praised the singles in particular, stating that the album "serves as the testament to Gill's arrival as a star and an enduring part of the country music legacy."

When I Call Your Name garnered numerous accolades. The album itself was certified double platinum by the Recording Industry Association of America (RIAA) in 1996, honoring shipments of two million copies in the United States. The title track won Gill his first Grammy Award in 1991, in the category of Best Male Vocal Country Performance; it was also nominated for Best Country Song. Additionally, the song won Single of the Year from the Country Music Association (CMA), his first award from that institution, in 1990. It would win Song of the Year at the academy's 1991 ceremony, where Gill was also awarded Male Vocalist of the Year and Vocal Event of the Year. He would win the former again in 1993, 1994, and 1995. The success of When I Call Your Name led to Gill touring in support of the album, which included a concert at SeaWorld San Antonio and one opening for McEntire at Caesars Palace, along with an induction into the Grand Ole Opry.

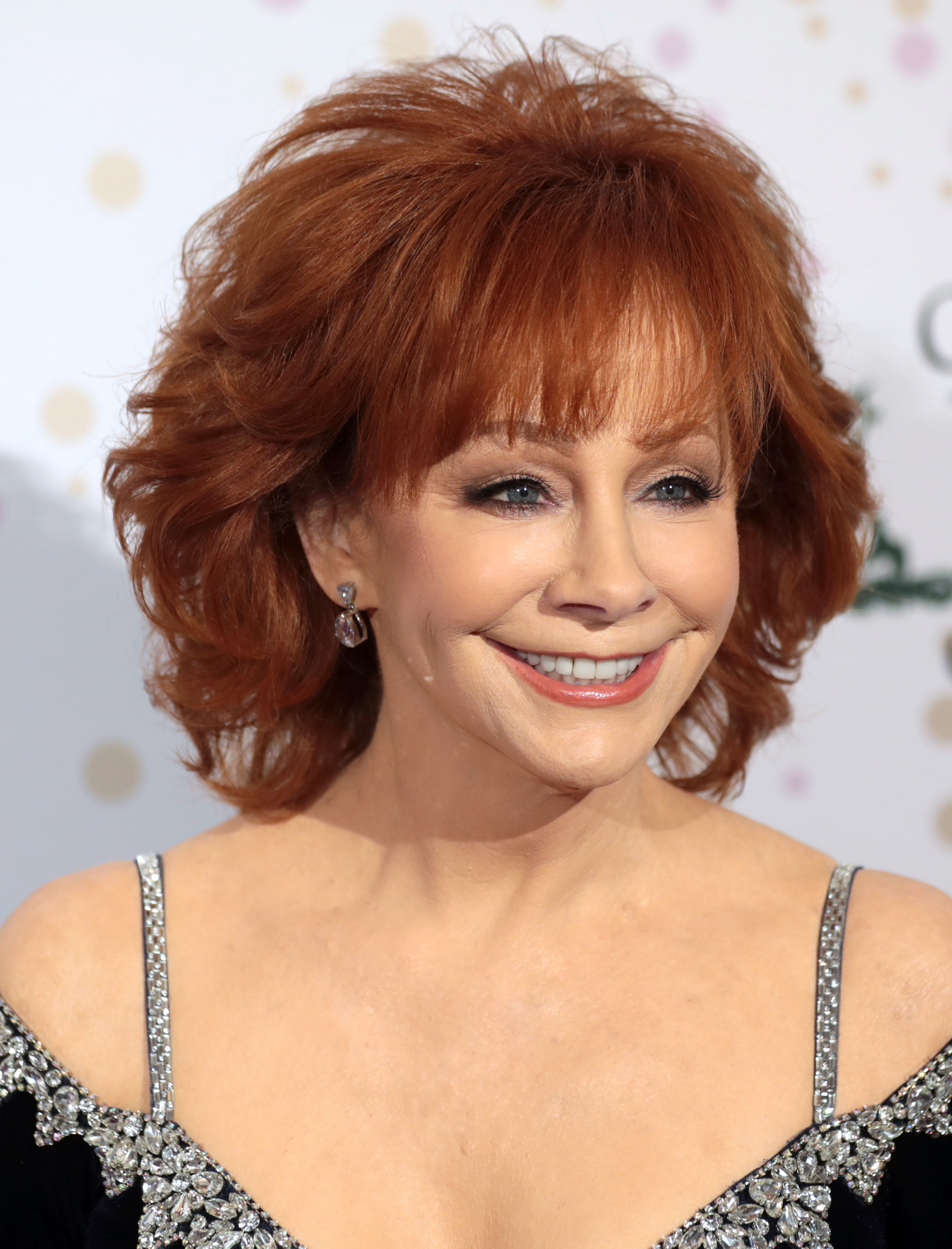
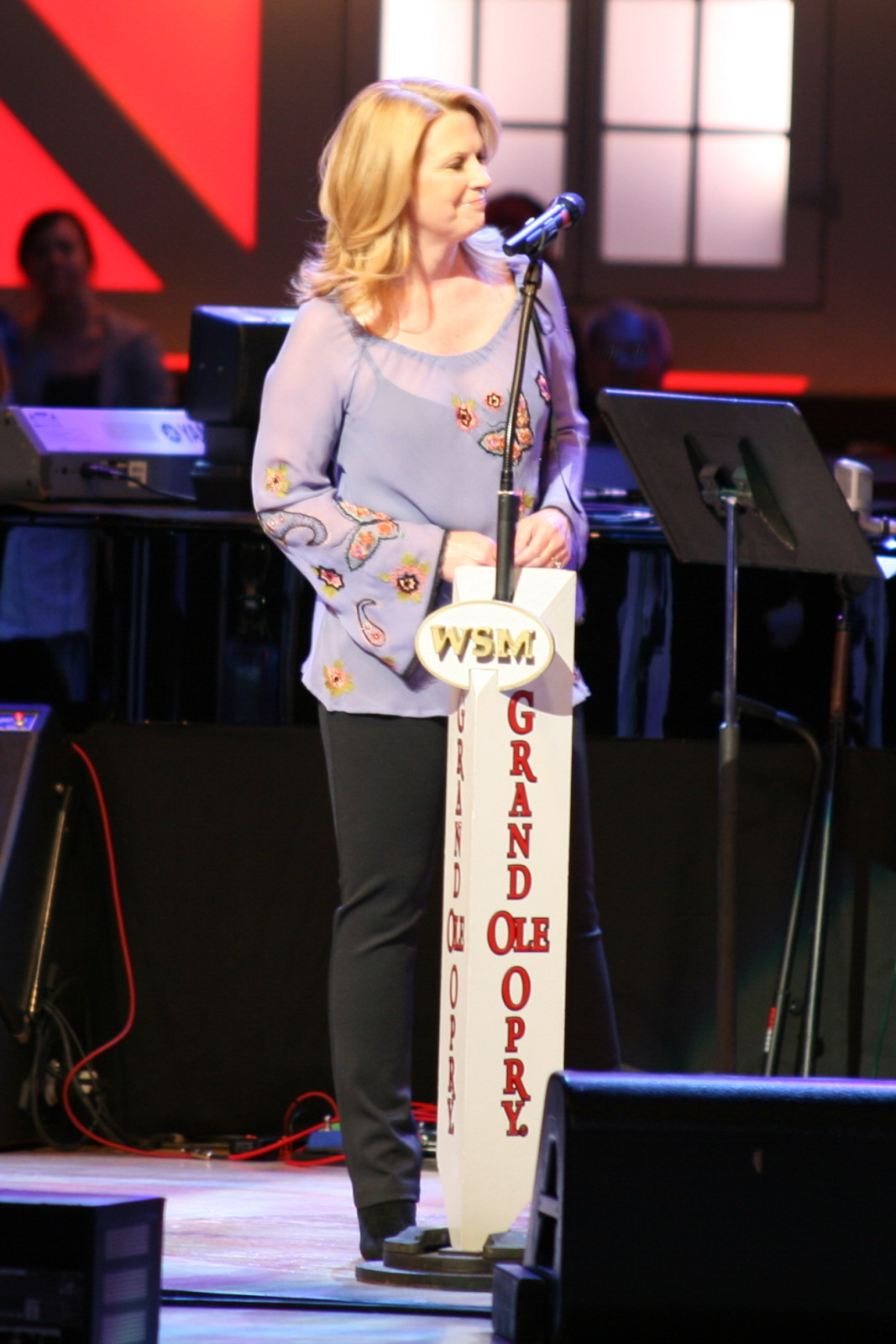
Gill has collaborated with Reba McEntire (left) and Patty Loveless (right).

Next on MCA was 1991's Pocket Full of Gold. The album's title track served as its lead single, and charted at number seven on the Billboard country music charts that same year. The song was inspired by an idea given to Gill by Brian Allsmiller, a friend of his who at the time was playing basketball for Vanderbilt University's college team. Although Gill wrote the song by himself, he credited Allsmiller as a co-writer. Follow-up "Liza Jane", which Gill wrote with Nielsen, reached the same peak. "Look at Us" (co-written by Gill and Max D. Barnes) and "Take Your Memory with You" also charted within the top five between then and 1992. Gill told Bob Paxman of the blog Sounds Like Nashville that he allowed Brown to select songs for the album, as he "trusted [Brown's] song sense". Once again, Loveless and Pedersen were among the backing vocalists. Another contributor to the album was pedal steel guitar player John Hughey, whose intro on "Look at Us" Gill later described as "iconic". Like its predecessor, Pocket Full of Gold was also certified double-platinum. The album accounted for Gill's second consecutive Grammy nomination in the category of Best Male Vocal Country Performance, as well as CMA Award for Song of the Year. In October 1991, Gill hosted the CMA awards telecast with Clint Black. Gill went on to host the awards ceremony every subsequent year through 2003.

=== 1992–1993: I Still Believe in You and Let There Be Peace on Earth ===
The late-1992 release I Still Believe in You was Gill's third on MCA. It also became his best-selling album, receiving a quintuple-platinum RIAA certification for shipments of five million copies in the United States. The title track became Gill's first number-one on Hot Country Songs in September 1992, a peak also achieved by its follow-up "Don't Let Our Love Start Slippin' Away" between December 1992 and January 1993. After this song, Gill provided duet vocals on Reba McEntire's number-one single "The Heart Won't Lie", on which Brown was also a producer. She had originally intended to record the song with Kenny Rogers, but after proving unable to find a key in which both of them could sing the song comfortably, she instead chose Gill. The next single off I Still Believe in You was the number three "No Future in the Past". Following this, "One More Last Chance" and "Tryin' to Get Over You" both topped Hot Country Songs between late 1993 and early 1994. The latter was also Gill's first solo entry on the Billboard Hot 100. Alanna Nash of Entertainment Weekly contrasted I Still Believe in You favorably with then-labelmate Trisha Yearwood's Hearts in Armor in a dual review, considering both singers to have emotive vocals and an affinity for mature lyrics. She praised the lyrics of "I Still Believe in You" and "No Future in the Past" in particular. AllMusic writer Johnny Loftus considered Gill to have a "smooth" voice, while finding influences of soul music on the title track and of bluegrass music on "No Future in the Past". "I Still Believe in You" won both Best Country Song and Best Male Country Vocal Performance at the 35th Annual Grammy Awards in 1993, while "The Heart Won't Lie" was nominated for a Grammy Award for Best Country Collaboration with Vocals a year later. Gill won five CMA Awards in 1993, including Album of the Year, Entertainer of the Year, Male Vocalist of the Year, and Song of the Year, the last of which went to "I Still Believe in You".

During promotion for I Still Believe in You in 1993, Gill also released his first Christmas album Let There Be Peace on Earth. The album included a number of traditional Christmas songs as well as a cover of "Let There Be Peace on Earth", a 1955 gospel song written by Harlene Wood and Sy Miller. Gill's rendition featured vocals from his daughter Jenny. Other vocalists on the album included Gene Merlino, Sally Stevens, and Chris Rodriguez. Gill also included the original songs "One Bright Star", "'Til the Season Comes Around Again", and "It Won't Be the Same This Year".

=== 1994–1995: When Love Finds You and Souvenirs ===
His next release on MCA was 1994's When Love Finds You, which would chart a total of six singles on Billboard Hot Country Songs between then and 1995. First among these were "Whenever You Come Around" and "What the Cowgirls Do", both of which peaked at number two. Next were the title track, "Which Bridge to Cross (Which Bridge to Burn)", and "You Better Think Twice". All peaked within the top five throughout 1995. The sixth and final single was "Go Rest High on That Mountain" at number 14. Jurek thought that When Love Finds You was more reliant on ballads than the preceding albums, but praised the lyrical qualities of each, as well as the country rock influence of "You Better Think Twice". Bill Anderson co-wrote "Which Bridge to Cross", and attributed renewed interest in his music in the late 1990s to the success of this song. Gill had begun writing "Go Rest High on That Mountain" in 1989 as a tribute to Keith Whitley following his death that same year, but did not finish it until four years later when the death of Gill's half-brother Bob Cohen inspired him. Patty Loveless and Ricky Skaggs provided backing vocals on the track. Despite its lower chart showing, "Go Rest High on That Mountain" remained popular among fans and critics. Dayton Duncan's Country Music: An Illustrated History (adapted from the Ken Burns documentary Country Music) described it as a popular song for fans to commemorate the deaths of family members and friends. Rolling Stone ranked it number 17 in a list of the 40 Saddest Country Songs. In addition, the song received a two-times platinum certification from the RIAA in 2025, honoring digital sales of two million in the United States. At the 37th Annual Grammy Awards, "When Love Finds You" won Best Male Country Vocal Performance and was nominated for Best Country Song; a year later, "Go Rest High on That Mountain" would receive both awards. When Love Finds You was nominated for Best Country Album during the former ceremony as well.

Gill ended 1995 with a pair of compilation albums. First was Souvenirs, a greatest hits album featuring most of his MCA singles to that point as well as selected collaborations. In a review for The Orange County Register reprinted in The Orlando Sentinel, Gene Harbrecht thought the compilation showed Gill's artistic growth in the intervening years, while also noting its mix of ballads and up-tempo material. At the same time, RCA released The Essential Vince Gill, consisting of 20 singles and other songs he had recorded while on that label in the 1980s.

=== 1996–1999: High Lonesome Sound and The Key ===
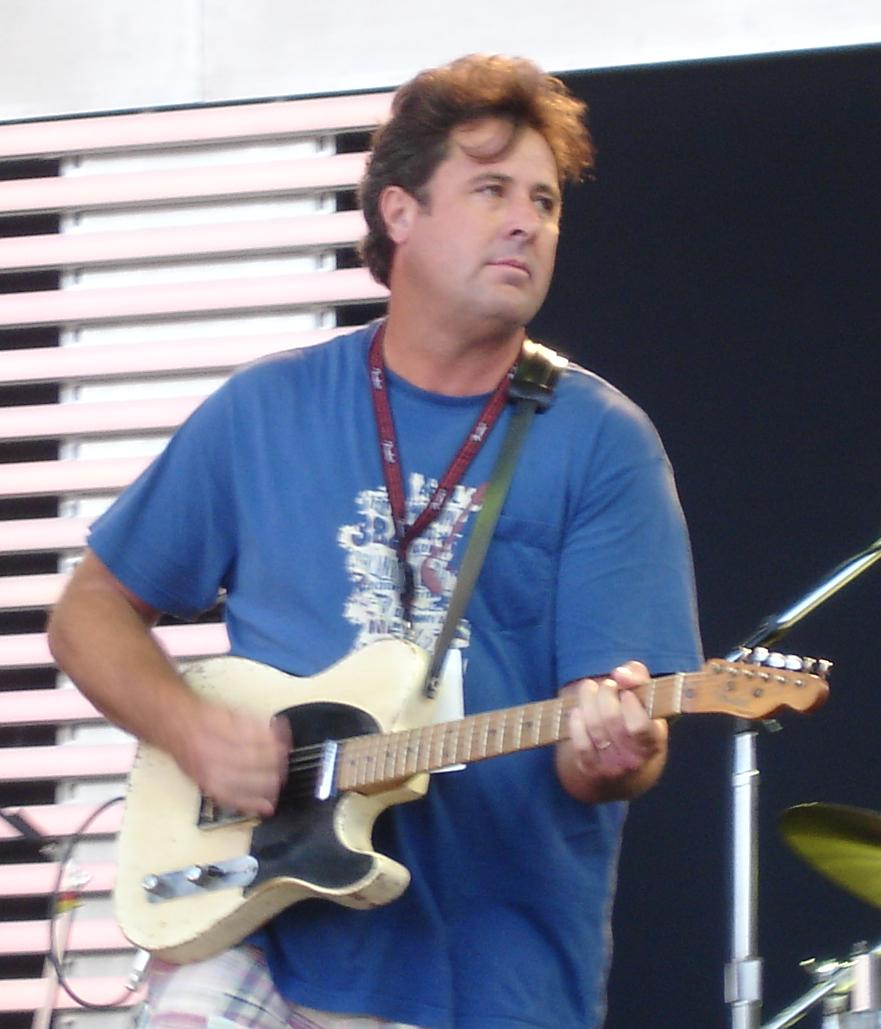
Gill in 2007

In 1996, MCA released Gill's next studio album High Lonesome Sound, with its title track also serving as the lead single. This song peaked at number twelve on the Billboard country charts in the United States, and went to number one on the Canadian country music charts then published by RPM. The album featured two versions of the song: one accompanied by studio musicians, and one accompanied by Alison Krauss & Union Station. Next on the Billboard country charts was the top five hit "Worlds Apart", followed by "Pretty Little Adriana" and "A Little More Love", which both peaked at number two. Last was "You and You Alone", a top-ten country hit for him in 1997. Gill was inspired to write "Pretty Little Adriana" after reading a news story about a girl named Adriana Dickerson, who was shot to death outside a Nashville supermarket in 1995. Michael McCall of AllMusic thought individual tracks off High Lonesome Sound showed influence of bluegrass, Chicago blues, and Cajun music; he also considered the ballads such as "Pretty Little Adriana" overall the strongest, calling them "more progressively atmospheric" than his previous ballads. Writing for Country Standard Time, Brian Wahlert praised Gill's vocals and guitar work, but thought that some songs including "Pretty Little Adriana" and the title track were "trite" and "cliché". The version of "High Lonesome Sound" featuring Alison Krauss & Union Station won Best Country Collaboration with Vocals, and "Worlds Apart" won Best Male Country Vocal Performance, at the 39th Annual Grammy Awards in 1997; one year later, "Pretty Little Adriana" won the latter award as well. Gill continued to tour in 1997, with his tours that year being the fourth most profitable among country artists. Despite this, he canceled a number of dates later in the year to take some time off following the death of his father, Stan.

Gill released two albums in 1998. First was the studio release The Key. It was led off by the song "If You Ever Have Forever in Mind", a top-five country hit. The song won the 1999 Grammy Award for Best Male Country Vocal Performance. Also released as singles were "Kindly Keep It Country", "Don't Come Cryin' to Me", and "My Kind of Woman/My Kind of Man". The last of these, a duet with Patty Loveless, also appeared on her 1999 compilation Classics. In addition to Loveless, other featured vocalists included Dawn Sears on "Don't Come Cryin' to Me" and Lee Ann Womack on "Kindly Keep It Country", as well as Alison Krauss, Shelby Lynne, Sonya Isaacs, Faith Hill, and Sara Evans. In turn, Gill sang backing vocals on Hill's "Let Me Let Go" and Evans's "No Place That Far", both of which were number-one country songs between late 1998 and early 1999. AllMusic writer Jana Pendragon summarized her review of the album by writing, "For emotional depth, honesty, and the kind of musical depth and artistry listeners have come to expect from Gill, The Key stands among his very finest recordings." No Depression writer Grant Alden also reviewed the album with favor, noting that Gill wrote most of the songs by himself; he also described the album's sound and lyrics as containing "emotion and elegance". Later in the year was Gill's second Christmas project, Breath of Heaven: A Christmas Collection, on which he was accompanied by Patrick Williams and his orchestra. AllMusic reviewer Jana Pendragon praised the album for its orchestral accompaniment, as well as its inclusion of both secular and Christian material. Both The Key and Breath of Heaven: A Christmas Collection were certified platinum in the United States.

=== 2000–2003: Let's Make Sure We Kiss Goodbye and Next Big Thing ===
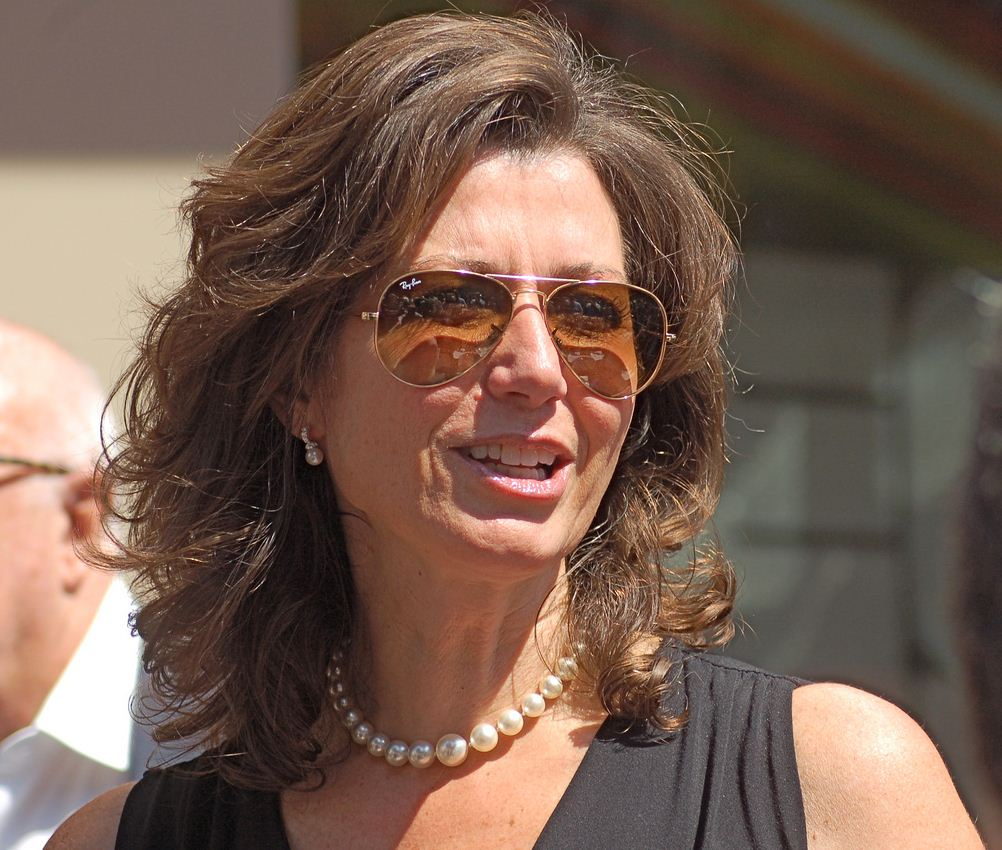
Gill married Amy Grant in 2000.

In 2000, Gill released the studio album Let's Make Sure We Kiss Goodbye. The album accounted for three singles in its title track, "Feels Like Love", and "Shoot Straight from Your Heart". Of these, "Feels Like Love" was the most successful with a peak of number six on Hot Country Songs. It also accounted for his highest solo Hot 100 peak of number 52. Amy Grant, to whom Gill would become married during the recording of the album, co-wrote and provided duet vocals on the track "When I Look into Your Heart". Many critics considered the album's themes to have been influenced by the then-recent marriage. Jurek noted that the project was dominated by songs about falling in love, but praised Gill's lyrics and vocals, as well as Brown's production. Nash criticized the sound of the album as "goop" and "tepid" outside the title track. Similarly, in a review for Knight Ridder republished in the Ventura County Star, Howard Cohen panned the project for "stock sentiments and imagery" of love and "overly slick balladry". Let's Make Sure We Kiss Goodbye was certified gold after release.

Gill did not issue another studio album until 2003's Next Big Thing. He wrote its lead single and title track "Next Big Thing" with John Hobbs and former NRBQ member Al Anderson; the song would become Gill's last solo top-20 country chart entry upon release. Also released from the album were the less successful singles "Someday" and "Young Man's Town". In a 2003 telephone interview with Country Standard Time, Gill said that many of the lyrics on Next Big Thing were inspired by his increasing age and the rise of younger artists who had surpassed him commercially in the intervening years. He also wanted the album to include more humorous material than his previous works. As Brown had stopped working for MCA at the time, this left him unavailable as a producer, so Gill produced the project by himself. Jurek praised the album for including more songs than normal for a country album and having strong production. His review highlighted the singles in particular, additionally noting the contributions of Grant and Michael McDonald. The track "Real Mean Bottle" (inspired by a comment session guitarist Harold Bradley made about Merle Haggard's "The Bottle Let Me Down") was later covered by Bob Seger on his 2006 album Face the Promise. "Next Big Thing" won the 2004 Grammy Award for Best Male Country Vocal Performance.

=== 2004–2007: The Notorious Cherry Bombs and These Days ===
In 2004, Gill and Rodney Crowell decided to re-establish Crowell's former backing band the Cherry Bombs after most of the members had reunited at an awards banquet for the American Society of Composers, Authors and Publishers (ASCAP). This lineup included all the former members except for bassist Emory Gordy Jr., who declined to participate, and drummer Larrie Londin, who died of a heart attack in 1992. Their respective roles were taken over by session musicians Michael Rhodes and Eddie Bayers. Crediting themselves as the Notorious Cherry Bombs, this group of musicians recorded one self-titled album for Universal South Records (now Show Dog-Universal Music) in 2004, which featured Gill and Crowell alternating as vocalists. The project charted one single on Hot Country Songs with "It's Hard to Kiss the Lips at Night That Chew Your Ass Out All Day Long".

Gill's next project for MCA was 2006's These Days, a box set comprising four albums each recorded in a different style. These were Workin' on a Big Chill for country rock, The Reason Why for soul music, Some Things Never Get Old for neotraditional country, and Little Brother for bluegrass music. Among the guest vocalists on the album were Grant, McDonald, Loveless, Crowell, Del McCoury, LeAnn Rimes, Sheryl Crow, Diana Krall, and Trisha Yearwood. Gill co-produced with Justin Niebank and John Hobbs, and wrote most of the songs by himself. Jurek reviewed the project favorably on AllMusic, highlighting the stylistic and lyrical diversity; he concluded his review by stating that the project was "an exhaustive, profound, fun and fulfilling set that not only gives fans something to delight in, but goes wide and if given half a chance could and would attract many new ones." Scott Jordan of the Austin Chronicle panned the songs on The Reason Why but compared the tracks on Workin' on a Big Chill favorably to Delbert McClinton and praised the introspective lyrics in some of the tracks on Little Brother. The project charted two singles: "The Reason Why" (featuring Alison Krauss) and "What You Give Away" (featuring Sheryl Crow). At the end of 2006, These Days was certified platinum. "The Reason Why" won Gill a Grammy Award for Best Male Country Vocal Performance at the 49th Annual Grammy Awards in 2007; one year later, These Days won Best Country Album and was nominated for Album of the Year.

=== 2008–2015: The Time Jumpers, Guitar Slinger, and Bakersfield ===
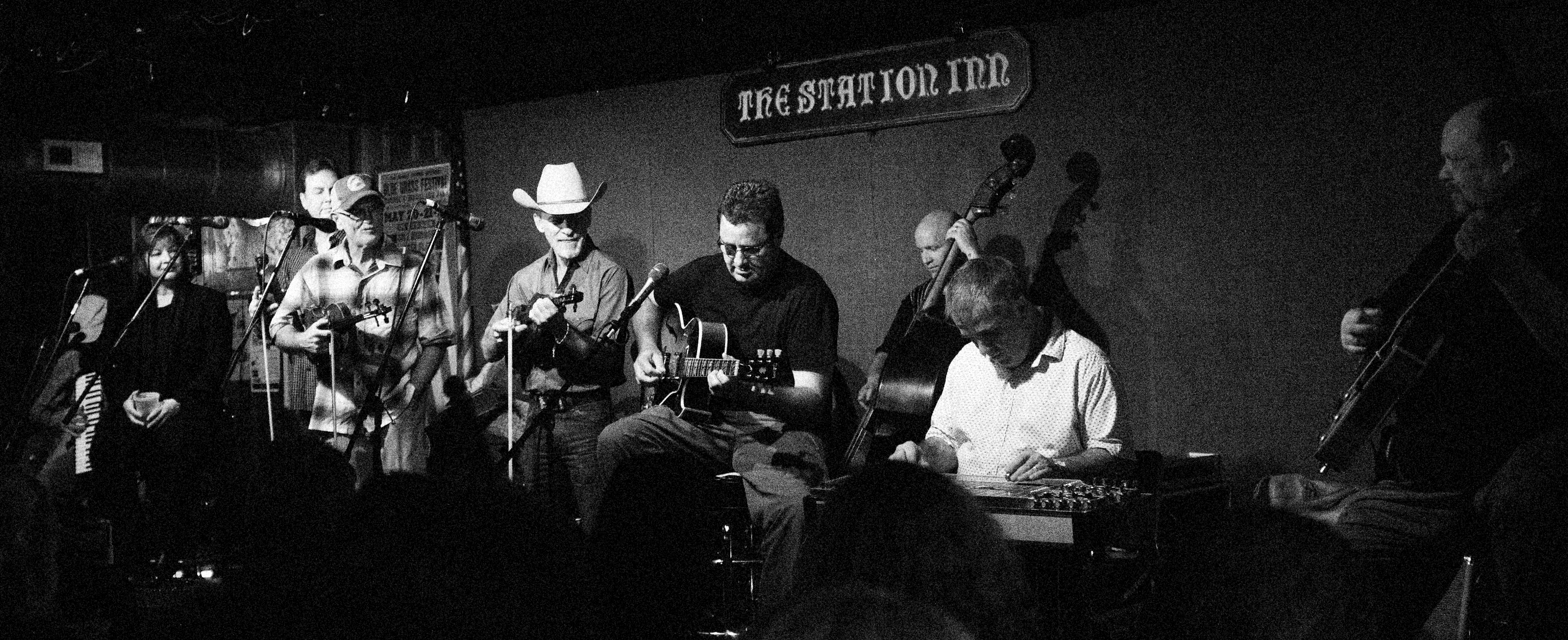
Gill (center, seated and playing guitar) with the Time Jumpers in 2011

Despite recording fewer albums throughout the first two decades of the 21st century, Gill remained active as a touring artist. He and Amy Grant accompanied actor, comedian, and musician Steve Martin in May 2009 for his debut on the Grand Ole Opry, which also served as promotion for Martin's album The Crow: New Songs for the 5-String Banjo. In 2010, Gill joined the Time Jumpers, an informal collection of musicians who play bluegrass and Western swing concerts at various venues around Nashville. The ensemble recorded their self-titled second studio album at Gill's home studio in 2012. During his tenure in the band, Gill and the Time Jumpers won Grammy Award for Best American Roots Song for the track "Kid Sister" from their 2016 album of the same name. Gill would continue to perform with the Time Jumpers until 2020.

His next solo release was 2011's Guitar Slinger. The album once again featured songs written or co-written by Gill, along with vocal contributions from Bekka Bramlett, Chris Stapleton, then-former McBride & the Ride member Billy Thomas, and Gill's daughter Jenny. Hobbs and Niebank also co-produced with Gill. Grant also provided a duet vocal on the track "True Love". The project charted one single in "Threaten Me with Heaven". Jurek thought this track and others on the album had themes of "mortality", which he considered unusual for Gill's work. Additionally, Jurek found influences of rhythm and blues and gospel music among individual tracks. Two years later, Gill collaborated with session steel guitar player Paul Franklin on the cover song project Bakersfield. This featured their renditions of songs by Merle Haggard and Buck Owens, two of the main artists known for the Bakersfield sound. Gill and J.T. Corenflos alternated as lead guitarists on the sessions, with other musical contributors including bassist Willie Weeks, drummer Greg Morrow, and backing vocalist Dawn Sears. Both Franklin and Sears had also recorded with Gill in the Time Jumpers. Among the tracks covered were Owens's "Together Again" and Haggard's "The Fightin' Side of Me". Jurek thought that the album's song choices highlighted the "edgier" nature of the Bakersfield sound, while also speaking favorably of Gill's vocals and Franklin's playing. Roughstock writer Matt Bjorke also praised the musicianship and song selection, stating that "Mainstream channels may not care much for this kind of music anymore but it's still as vibrant and fantastic as it has always been and in the loving hands of Vince Gill and Paul Franklin it shines once again."

=== 2016–present: Down to My Last Bad Habit, membership in Eagles, and Okie ===
Gill released Down to My Last Bad Habit through MCA in 2016. The lead single to the project was "Take Me Down", featuring guest vocals from Little Big Town. This song charted at number 60 on the Billboard country singles charts. He wrote the song with Richard Marx and Jillian Jacqueline. Cam also contributed vocals to the track "I'll Be Waiting for You". Stephen Thomas Erlewine wrote that Gill "maintains an elegant, soulful air throughout the record", while highlighting the number of guest artists and considering the sound to be influenced by Memphis soul.

Following the death of Eagles member Glenn Frey in 2017, Gill was asked by the remaining band members to replace him. He accepted the offer, as he considered himself a fan of not only the Eagles, but also of Frey's solo material. Gill debuted as a member of the band at a concert held in Dodger Stadium in 2017. Both Gill and Frey's son Deacon have continued to tour as members of the band throughout the 2010s and 2020s, and plan to continue doing so until the end of the band's farewell tour in 2025. Of his membership with the Eagles, Gill stated in an interview with Taste of Country in 2018 that he had a sense of "gratitude" for the other band members choosing him as Frey's replacement, but also added, "in my heart of hearts I wish I wasn't doing it. That would mean Glenn would still be around, but life is what it is and you just go do what you can do because of what happens. Those songs deserve to live on as long as they can."

His next release on MCA was 2019's Okie. Once again, Gill produced with Niebank, in addition to playing guitar alongside Jedd Hughes and Tom Bukovac. According to Taste of Country, Gill conceived the album as more autobiographical than his previous works. The track "Letter to My Mama" was promoted as the first single. The track features Gill playing Dobro. Jurek considered the album "a laid-back collection of original songs that are more poignant and more nakedly autobiographical and topical than anything he's previously issued." The album included a song about Amy Grant titled "When My Amy Prays", which won Gill a Grammy Award for Best Country Solo Performance.

A second collaborative album with Paul Franklin followed in 2023. Titled Sweet Memories: The Music of Ray Price & the Cherokee Cowboys, it features the two covering songs by Ray Price. In an interview with Variety, both musicians stated that they wanted to do a second album following Bakersfield, and chose Ray Price because both had contributed to some of his later albums. This was followed in October 2025 by an announcement that he had signed a "lifetime" contract with MCA. Coinciding with this contract, he also announced plans to release a new extended play each month for the next year, as part of a series titled 50 Years from Home. The EPs will include a mix of new and existing material; the first in the series, I Gave You Everything I Had, was released in October 2025.

On November 10, 2025, it was announced that Gill would receive the Willie Nelson Lifetime Achievement Award at the 59th Annual Country Music Association Awards.

== Work for other artists ==
Gill is known for a large number of collaborative works as a duet partner, session musician, songwriter, and backing vocalist. Of his prolificacy as a collaborative artist, Brown stated in 1998 that Gill often sang harmony for other artists because he enjoyed doing so. One of his first collaborations came in 1987 when Emmylou Harris chose Gill to appear on her album Angel Band, a compilation of gospel music standards. Gill played mandolin and sang backing vocals on the project, which also included Emory Gordy Jr. and bluegrass musician Carl Jackson. Alabama recorded one of Gill's compositions, "Here We Are", on their 1990 album Pass It On Down. Their version went to number two on the country music charts in 1991. Also in 1991, Mark O'Connor recorded a cover version of Carl Perkins's "Restless" for his album The New Nashville Cats. This rendition featured O'Connor on fiddle, with Gill, Steve Wariner, and Ricky Skaggs alternating on lead vocals and guitar. Credited to Mark O'Connor & the New Nashville Cats, this rendition went to number 25 on the country charts. All four artists won Grammy Award for Best Country Collaboration with Vocals in 1992 for this song, as well as CMA Vocal Event of the Year. Gill covered the Eagles's "I Can't Tell You Why" for the late-1993 tribute album Common Thread: The Songs of the Eagles, with then-former Eagles member Timothy B. Schmit on backing vocals and Jim Horn on soprano saxophone. While not officially promoted as a single, this cover reached number 42 on Hot Country Songs due to unsolicited airplay. On two occasions, Gill collaborated with Asleep at the Wheel on a cover of a Bob Wills song. The first was "Red Wing" on the 1993 album Tribute to the Music of Bob Wills and the Texas Playboys; the second was "Bob's Breakdowns" from Ride with Bob: A Tribute to Bob Wills and the Texas Playboys six years later. Both collaborations won Grammy Award for Best Country Instrumental Performance in their respective years of release. Gill's third instrumental Grammy Award win came in 2001 on a rendition of Earl Scruggs's "Foggy Mountain Breakdown", done for the collaboration album Earl Scruggs and Friends.

Throughout the 1980s and 1990s, Gill was a frequent collaborator of Patty Loveless. He sang backing vocals on her 1987 self-titled debut album, and also on her 1989 hit "Timber, I'm Falling in Love". Additionally, she did likewise on several of his singles, including "When I Call Your Name", "Pocket Full of Gold", and "Go Rest High on That Mountain". In 1994, Gill contributed to two collaborations. First was "House of Love", a duet with Amy Grant from her album of the same name. The song was a top-40 hit on the Hot 100 after its release. Gill's other collaboration in 1994 was on Kermit Unpigged, an album featuring the Muppets performing alongside a number of musical guests. On this album, Gill and Kermit the Frog (then voiced by Steve Whitmire) recorded a cover of the Lovin' Spoonful's "Daydream"; this cover reached number 65 on the Canadian RPM country charts. A year later, Gill sang a duet with Dolly Parton on a re-recording of her hit "I Will Always Love You" on her album Something Special. Gill had originally wanted to wait until after "Go Rest High on That Mountain" to release the duet version of "I Will Always Love You". However, demand from radio caused the duet to chart prematurely and ascend the charts simultaneously with "Go Rest High on That Mountain", and Gill chose not to intervene. Gill co-wrote and provided backing vocals on the track "You Just Get One", recorded in 1995 by Ty Herndon on his debut album What Mattered Most. Jeff Wood later released a version of the song in 1997, which featured Gill on both lead guitar and mandolin. Also in 1997, both Gill and Alison Krauss were credited for their backing vocals on Mark Chesnutt's "It's Not Over"; the three had originally recorded it in 1992 for Chesnutt's album Longnecks & Short Stories, but Chesnutt chose to include it on his 1997 album Thank God for Believers and release it as a single as he thought the song still had potential. In 1998, Gill won another Grammy Award for Best Country Instrumental Performance, as a featured performer on Randy Scruggs's "A Soldier's Joy" from his album Crown of Jewels. A year later, he sang duet vocals on Barbra Streisand's "If You Ever Leave Me".

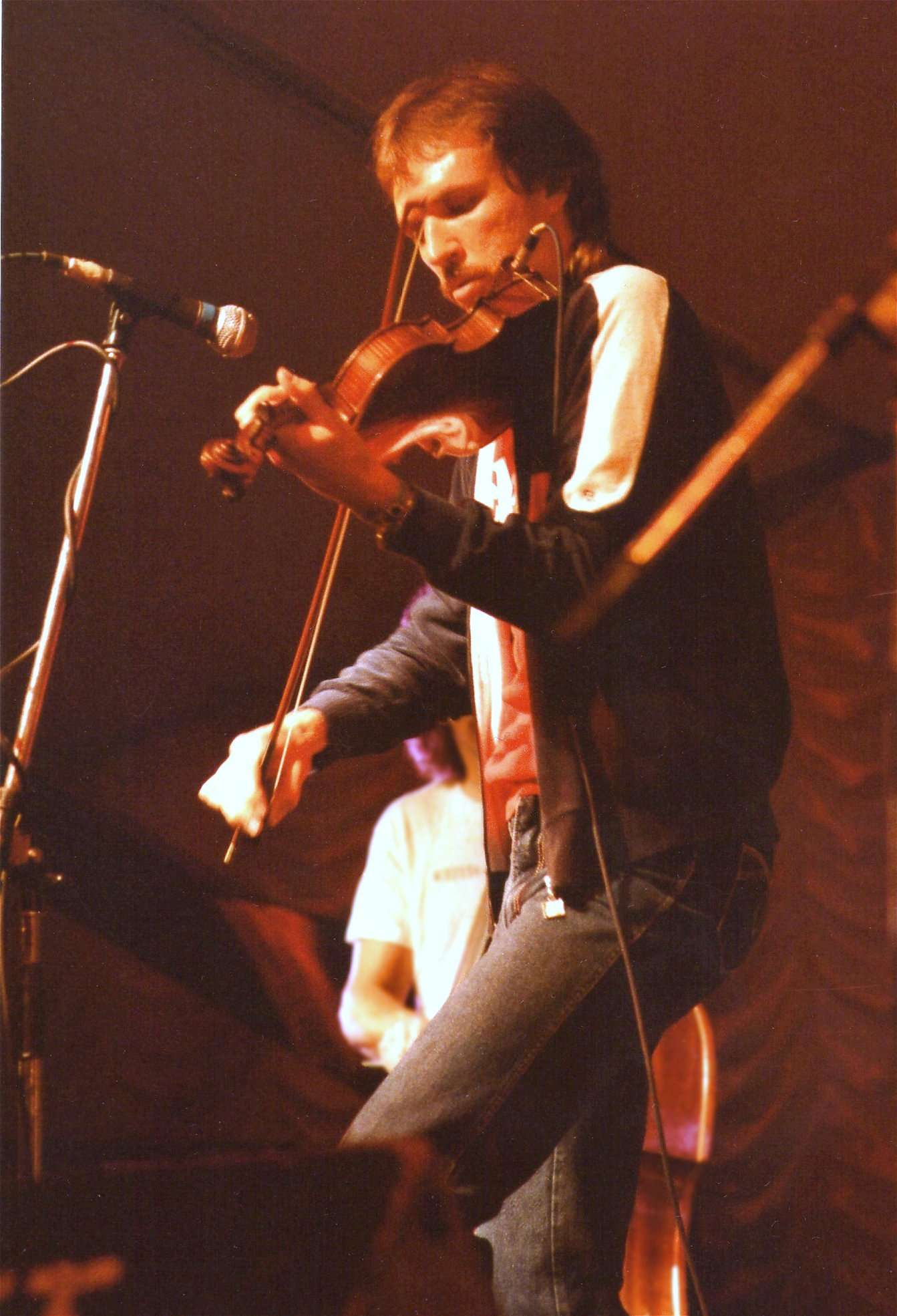
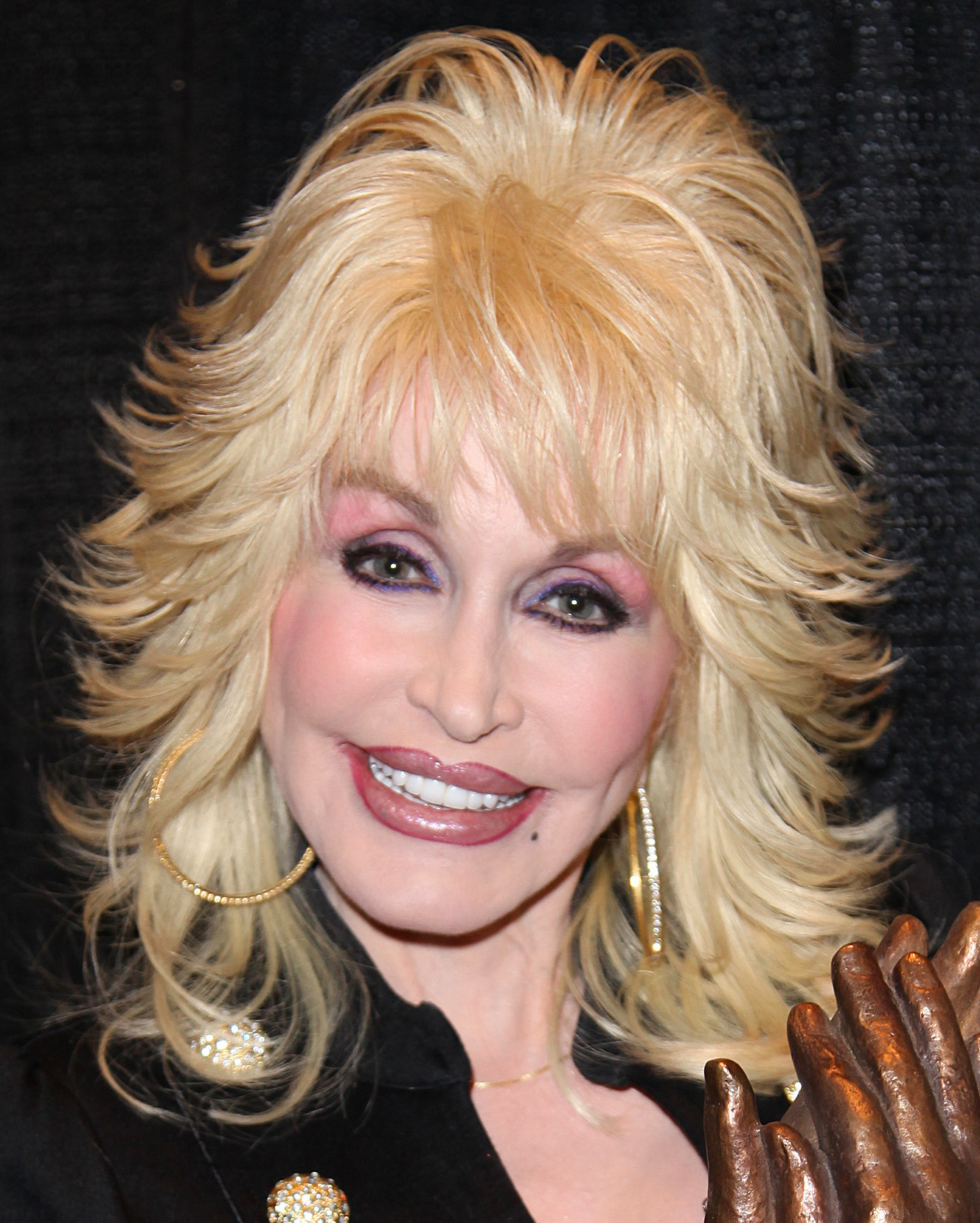
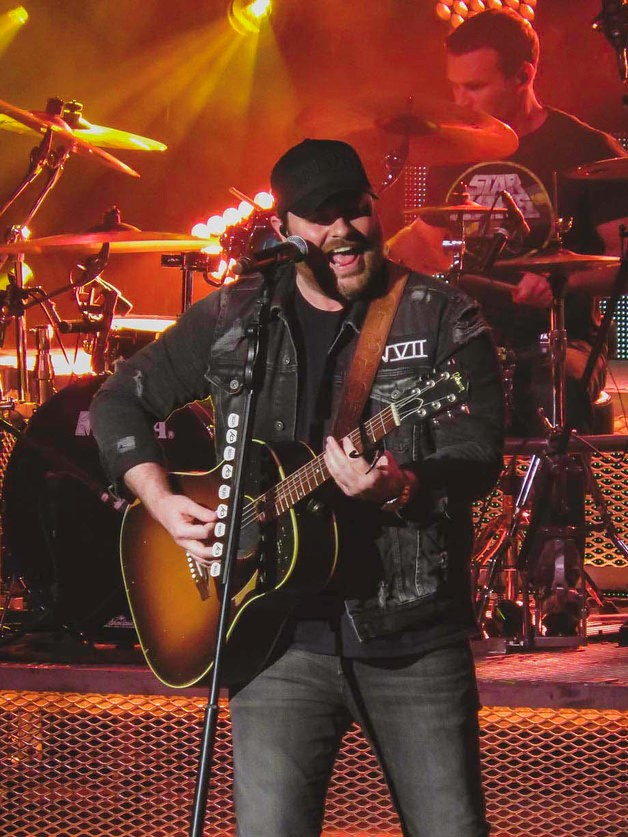
Artists with whom Gill has collaborated include (left to right): Mark O'Connor, Dolly Parton, and Chris Young.

Gill and Sheryl Crow were both credited for their backing vocals on Brooks & Dunn's "Building Bridges", a top-five country hit in 2006. Brad Paisley's 2008 instrumental album Play: The Guitar Album featured Gill as one of several instrumentalists on the track "Cluster Pluck", which accounted for Gill's fourth Grammy win in the category of Best Country Instrumental Performance. Gill was featured on Kelly Clarkson's 2012 single "Don't Rush" as well. A year later he co-produced Ashley Monroe's album Like a Rose and co-wrote two songs on it. The two toured with Charlie Worsham in 2015. Gill was credited for his backing vocals and lead guitar on Chris Young's late-2016 single "Sober Saturday Night", which also went to number one on the Billboard country charts. Gill also charted in 2017 as a guest vocalist on Maren Morris's promotional single "Dear Hate", written in response to the 2017 Las Vegas shooting. The song was Gill's 65th entry on the country charts.

Three notable multi-artist collaborations have featured Gill as a performer. First was "Tomorrow's World", a charity single written by Kix Brooks and Pam Tillis featuring over 20 country music singers, and released by Warner Records to honor the 20th anniversary of Earth Day. In 1996, he participated in "Hope: Country Music's Quest for a Cure", a charity single by the T.J. Martell Foundation to honor cancer and leukemia research. He also participated in the 2016 collaboration "Forever Country", a medley of "I Will Always Love You", "On the Road Again", and "Country Roads, Take Me Home" recorded by 30 country artists to commemorate the 50th anniversary of the Country Music Association. This collaboration went to number one on the Billboard country charts under the credit "Artists of Then, Now, and Forever".

== Musical style ==
Gill's music is defined by his tenor voice, guitar playing, and breadth of influences. The editors of The Encyclopedia of Country Music wrote of Gill in 1998, "With an aching tenor, award-winning songwriting skills, and virtuoso guitar chops that rival those of any ace Nashville session player, Vince Gill is one of today's biggest country superstars." His vocal style has also been noted for its bluegrass music phrasing. Steve Huey of AllMusic describes Gill as "one of the most respected musicians in the history of country music". He characterizes Gill's early work as influential in the neotraditional country movements of the late 1980s to early 1990s, but thought his membership in both Pure Prairie League and the Eagles showed an interest in his music outside of country music as well. Sarah Rodman of Entertainment Weekly referred to Gill as "the Oklahoma native with the tenor kissed by angels and the guitar prowess of a man who made a deal with the devil" and stated that he "rose to become one of the most respected names in country music, often serving as a link between the classic artists that preceded him and the generation of stars that have followed in his footsteps."

Jeffrey B. Remz, writing for Country Standard Time, stated that Gill "was a fine singer with his sturdy tenor, and his guitar playing has always been considered top notch. A heavy touring schedule resulted from his success with concerts, sometimes going on for three hours. He was not a paint-by-the-numbers kind of country performer." Joe Bosso of Guitar World describes Gill as having "virtuosic and sweetly expressive solos" in both flatpicking and fingerstyle guitar; in the same article, Gill himself stated that he "play[s] what's necessary". Of his guitar playing, Jo Sgammato stated that his playing lead guitar while also being a vocalist was uncommon among country music artists; she also noted that critics had compared his style to Eric Clapton and Chet Atkins.

Gill cites Merle Haggard as one of his main influences. In 2003, he stated in an interview with Country Standard Time, "he's the greatest singer, the greatest phraser, and then on top of that, his songs are really poetic." He has also named female artists he grew up on, such as Patsy Cline and Kitty Wells, as influences. Outside of country music, Gill has also named Bruce Springsteen and John Fogerty as influences, as he considered their works to have "honesty". Gill said that he characterized his own songwriting by "simplicity", a characteristic he also thought was present in the works of Hank Williams. Jo Sgammato also noted in The Vince Gill Story that Gill's albums had a higher number of songs written by him than his contemporaries did. She also thought the track "Nothing Like a Woman" from I Still Believe in You had a Motown influence due to Gill's "high, wailing chorus", while comparing both "Say Hello" from the same album and "Don't Come Cryin' to Me" from The Key to the Bakersfield sound. Additionally, Sgammato observed that Gill tended to have hits with ballads more frequently than with up-tempo material, although she cited "Liza Jane" and "One More Last Chance" as successful examples of the latter.

Gill has also been a point of comparison and influence for other artists. When he debuted in 1995, Bryan White was compared to Gill by Tom Lanham of New Country magazine, who found influence of Gill in both the vocals and songwriting of White's single "Rebecca Lynn". Jason Sellers played bass guitar in Gill's road band in the late 1990s, and consulted Gill a number of times for career advice prior to singing with BNA Records in 1997. In a review of his debut album, Jeff Davis of Country Standard Time thought that Sellers idolized Gill and was "imitative" of him. In turn, Sellers filled in for Gill on a number of live performances of "Don't Rush" where Gill was unavailable. Country and bluegrass singer Charlie Worsham has named Gill as an influence, and claimed that "Liza Jane" was one of the first songs he learned to play on guitar. In 2018, Gill gave Worsham a custom-made guitar, which Worsham played on his second album Beginning of Things.

== Personal life ==
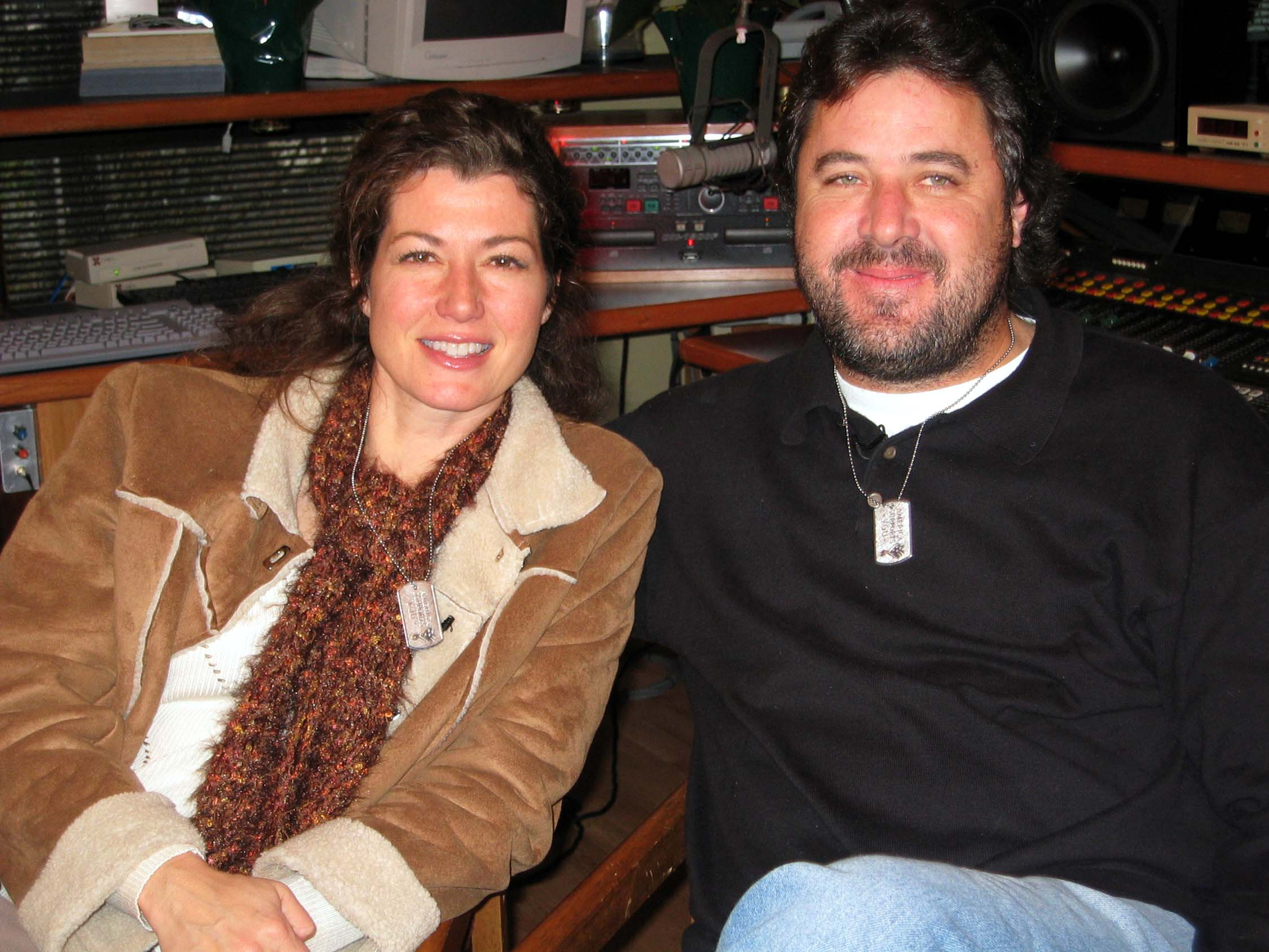
Gill (right) and Amy Grant (left) in 2004

In April 1980, Gill married singer Janis Oliver, who would join her sister Kristine in the country duo Sweethearts of the Rodeo later in the decade. According to Sgammato, Gill wrote both "Everybody's Sweetheart" and "The Radio" about his relationship with her. They divorced in 1997, citing irreconcilable differences. The couple had one daughter, Jennifer "Jenny" Gill, of whom Janis assumed custody following their divorce. Jenny has contributed to her father's albums on a number of occasions, including Let There Be Peace on Earth. Steve Huey, writing for AllMusic, noted that many critics thought songs from The Key were influenced by the divorce from Oliver. Gill began dating contemporary Christian music singer Amy Grant in 1999 following her divorce from singer Gary Chapman. The two married on March 10, 2000. AllMusic writer Thom Jurek thought that certain tracks on Let's Make Sure We Kiss Goodbye were inspired by his marriage to Grant, which occurred during the recording of that album. One year after their marriage, the couple had a daughter, named Corrinna. In 2023, Corrinna Gill began releasing her own music online.

Gill is known for his pleasant demeanor and frequent involvements in charity works, leading many publications to refer to him as the "nicest guy in Nashville". In an article for The Washington Post republished in The Palm Beach Post, journalist Richard Harrington described Gill as "perpetually affable, easily approachable, [and] ego-deficient." Gill enjoys golf and in 1993 started a golf charity known as the Vinny Pro-Celebrity Golf Invitational, which raises money for children's golf in the state of Tennessee. Gill received a 2003 Distinguished Service Award from the Professional Golfers' Association of America to honor this charity. In 1995, Gill held a concert to benefit the American Red Cross following the Oklahoma City bombing. One charity to which Gill contributes is All for the Hall, an annual benefit concert for the Country Music Hall of Fame.

== Discography ==
=== Studio albums ===
- The Things That Matter (1985)
- The Way Back Home (1987)
- When I Call Your Name (1989)
- Pocket Full of Gold (1991)
- I Still Believe in You (1992)
- Let There Be Peace on Earth (1993)
- When Love Finds You (1994)
- High Lonesome Sound (1996)
- The Key (1998)
- Breath of Heaven: A Christmas Collection (1998)
- Let's Make Sure We Kiss Goodbye (2000)
- Next Big Thing (2003)
- These Days (2006)
- Guitar Slinger (2011)
- Bakersfield (with Paul Franklin) (2013)
- Down to My Last Bad Habit (2016)
- Okie (2019)
- Sweet Memories (with Paul Franklin) (2023)

== Awards and nominations ==
Gill has won eight Academy of Country Music awards and 18 Country Music Association awards, out of 37 nominations from the former and 54 from the latter. He has won 22 Grammy Awards (out of 50 nominations), accounting for the most wins among solo male country music singers.
