= Tryin' to Get Over You =

Single by Vince Gill

from the album I Still Believe in You
- B-side: "Nothing Like a Woman"
- Released: January 3, 1994
- Recorded: 1992
- Genre: Country
- Length: 3:43
- Label: MCA
- Songwriter: Vince Gill
- Producer: Tony Brown

Vince Gill singles chronology
"One More Last Chance" (1993)	"Tryin' to Get Over You" (1994)	"Whenever You Come Around" (1994)

"Tryin' to Get Over You" is a song written and recorded by American country music singer Vince Gill. It was released in January 1994 as the fifth single from his album I Still Believe in You. The song reached the top of the Billboard Hot Country Singles & Tracks (now Hot Country Songs) chart. It was also Gill's last number one single until 23 years later, when he reached number one with a guest vocal on Chris Young's "Sober Saturday Night" in March 2017.

== Music video ==
The music video was directed by John Lloyd Miller and premiered in early 1994. Filmed in black-and-white with a grainy texture, it features a cameo from Gill's then-wife, Janis. It begins with a still shot of Gill's and Janis' silhouette. The action begins as she instantly leaves him. The remainder of the video shows Gill in a bar and walking along a city street on a rainy night surrounded by various people and alone trying to cope with his sadness. Shots of Janis on her separate path (such as in a cafe and in the back seat of a cab driving away) looking blank-faced are also seen. It ends with a shot of Gill's silhouette again, this time alone.

== Chart performance ==
"Tryin' to Get Over You" debuted at number 63 on the U.S. Billboard Hot Country Singles & Tracks for the week of January 8, 1994.

Chart (1994)	Peak position
Canada Country Singles (RPM)	1
US Billboard Hot 100	88
US Hot Country Songs (Billboard)	1

=== Year-end charts ===
Chart (1994)	Position
Canada Country Tracks (RPM)	39
US Country Songs (Billboard)	31
