= Turn Me Loose (EP) =

1984 EP by Vince Gill

EP by Vince Gill
- Released: 1984
- Genre: Country
- Length: 26:24
- Label: RCA Nashville
- Producer: Emory Gordy Jr.

Vince Gill chronology
Turn Me Loose (1984)	The Things That Matter (1985)

Singles from Turn Me Loose
- 1. "Victim of Life's Circumstances" Released: February 1984; 2. "Oh Carolina" Released: May 1984; 3. "Turn Me Loose" Released: September 1984

Professional ratings
Review scores
Source	Rating
AllMusic	3/5 stars

Turn Me Loose is the first extended play by American country music artist Vince Gill. It was released in 1984 by RCA Nashville. The album produced three chart singles on the Billboard country chart in "Victim of Life's Circumstances", "Oh Carolina", and the title track, which respectively reached #40, #38, and #39. It was later reissued on CD in 1994 as a full album with two extra songs, "Waitin' For Your Love", and "Livin' The Way I Do".

== Track listing ==
No.	Title	Writer(s)	Length
1.	"Turn Me Loose"	Vince Gill	3:09
2.	"Oh Carolina"	Randy Albright; Jim Elliot; Mark D. Sanders	3:16
3.	"Don't Say That You Love Me"	Gill; Emory Gordy Jr.	2:47
4.	"Half a Chance"	Gill	3:35
5.	"Victim of Life's Circumstances"	Delbert McClinton	3:18
6.	"'Til the Best Comes Along"	Gill	3:41
Total length:			19:46

1994 CD Reissue

No.	Title	Writer(s)	Length
1.	"Turn Me Loose"	Vince Gill	3:09
2.	"Oh Carolina"	Randy Albright; Jim Elliot; Mark D. Sanders	3:16
3.	"Don't Say That You Love Me"	Vince Gill; Emory Gordy Jr.	2:47
4.	"Waitin' For Your Love"	Vince Gill	3:06
5.	"Half A Chance"	Vince Gill	3:37
6.	"Victim Of Life's Circumstances"	Delbert McClinton	3:19
7.	"'Til The Best Comes Along"	Vince Gill	3:42
8.	"Livin' The Way I Do"	Vince Gill
Total length:			26:00

== Personnel ==
- Richard Bennett - acoustic guitar
- Tony Brown - electric piano
- Hank DeVito - steel guitar
- Vince Gill - acoustic guitar, electric guitar, lead vocals, background vocals
- Emory Gordy Jr. - bass guitar
- Emmylou Harris - background vocals
- John Hobbs - piano
- Carl Jackson - background vocals
- Larrie Londin - drums
- JayDee Maness - steel guitar
- Janis Gill - background vocals
- Herb Pedersen - background vocals
- Mike Porter - percussion
- Brent Rowan - electric guitar
- Pete Wasner - piano

== Chart performance ==
Chart (1984)	Peak position
U.S. Billboard Top Country Albums	64
