= One More Last Chance =

Single by Vince Gill

from the album I Still Believe in You
- B-side: "Under These Conditions"
- Released: July 26, 1993
- Recorded: 1992
- Genre: Country
- Length: 3:11
- Label: MCA
- Songwriters: Vince Gill, Gary Nicholson
- Producer: Tony Brown

Vince Gill singles chronology
"No Future in the Past" (1993)	"One More Last Chance" (1993)	"Tryin' to Get Over You" (1994)

"One More Last Chance" is a song recorded by American country music singer Vince Gill. Gill co-wrote the song with Gary Nicholson. It was released in July 1993 as the fourth single from his album, I Still Believe in You. The song reached the top of the Billboard Hot Country Singles & Tracks (now Hot Country Songs) chart.

== Cover versions ==
Country music singer Ricky Skaggs covered the song from the television special CMT Giants: Vince Gill

== Music video ==
The music video was directed by John Lloyd Miller and premiered in mid-1993. In it, Gill, Belmont men's head basketball coach Rick Byrd, and various band members are seen playing a round of golf at a golf course, with Gill having ridden a John Deere tractor to the course. The video features a cameo by George Jones, who appears at the end of the video riding a John Deere riding mower to the golf course. The appearance echoes earlier incidents in Jones's life where he would ride his lawnmowers to go on beer runs because his wives would not let him drive a car.

== Chart performance ==
The song debuted at number 61 on the Hot Country Singles & Tracks chart dated July 31, 1993. It charted for 20 weeks on that chart, and climbed to Number One on the chart dated October 9, 1993, and stayed there for one week.

=== Charts ===
Chart (1993)	Peak position
Canada Adult Contemporary (RPM)	26
Canada Country Singles (RPM)	1
US Hot Country Songs (Billboard)	1

=== Year-end charts ===
Chart (1993)	Position
Canada Country Tracks (RPM)	59
US Country Songs (Billboard)	5

== Certifications ==
Region	Certification	Certified units/sales
United States (RIAA)	Gold	500,000^{‡}
^{‡} Sales+streaming figures based on certification alone.
