= Guitar Slinger (Vince Gill album) =

Studio album by Vince Gill
- Released: October 25, 2011
- Studio: The House and Blackbird Studio (Nashville, Tennessee)
- Genre: Country
- Length: 53:57
- Label: MCA Nashville
- Producer: Vince Gill; John Hobbs; Justin Niebank

Vince Gill chronology
Icon (2010)	Guitar Slinger (2011)	Ballads (2013)

Singles from Guitar Slinger
- 1. "Threaten Me with Heaven" Released: August 29, 2011

Professional ratings
Aggregate scores
Source	Rating
Metacritic	78/100
Review scores
Source	Rating
AllMusic	4/5 stars
Country Weekly	4/5 stars
Entertainment Weekly	A
The Independent	3/5 stars
PopMatters	6/10 stars
Slant Magazine	3.5/5 stars
USA Today	3.5/4 stars

Guitar Slinger is the twelfth studio album by American country music artist Vince Gill. It was released on October 25, 2011, via MCA Nashville. A deluxe edition was also released with three bonus tracks.

Lead-off single "Threaten Me with Heaven" received a nomination on the 54th Grammy Awards for Best Country Song and also a nomination for Song of the Year on the 47th Academy of Country Music Awards.

== Track listing ==
No.	Title	Writer(s)	Length
1.	"Guitar Slinger"	Vince Gill	4:05
2.	"Tell Me Fool"	Gill, Pete Wasner	4:05
3.	"Threaten Me with Heaven"	Gill, Amy Grant, Dillon O'Brian, Will Owsley	5:31
4.	"When the Lady Sings the Blues"	Gill, Wasner	4:34
5.	"Who Wouldn't Fall in Love with You"	Gill, Ashley Monroe	4:58
6.	"When Lonely Comes Around"	Gill, Grant, Owsley	3:45
7.	"True Love" (featuring Amy Grant)	Gill, Grant	4:44
8.	"Bread and Water"	Gill, Leslie Satcher	4:44
9.	"Billy Paul"	Gill	3:52
10.	"The Old Lucky Diamond Motel"	Gill	3:39
11.	"If I Die"	Gill, Monroe	3:40
12.	"Buttermilk John" (with the Time Jumpers)	Gill	6:20

Deluxe Edition track listing
No.	Title	Writer(s)	Length
1.	"Guitar Slinger"	Vince Gill	4:05
2.	"All Nighter Comin'"	Gill, Al Anderson, Chris Stapleton	2:34
3.	"Tell Me Fool"	Gill, Pete Wasner	4:05
4.	"Threaten Me with Heaven"	Gill, Amy Grant, Dillon O'Brian, Will Owsley	5:31
5.	"When the Lady Sings the Blues"	Gill, Wasner	4:34
6.	"Who Wouldn't Fall in Love with You"	Gill, Ashley Monroe	4:58
7.	"When Lonely Comes Around"	Gill, Grant, Owsley	3:45
8.	"True Love"	Gill, Grant	4:44
9.	"Bread and Water"	Gill, Leslie Satcher	4:44
10.	"Billy Paul"	Gill	3:52
11.	"The Old Lucky Diamond Motel"	Gill	3:39
12.	"Lipstick Everywhere"	Gill	3:11
13.	"One More Thing I Wished I'd Said"	Gill, Amber Digby	4:05
14.	"If I Die"	Gill, Monroe	3:40
15.	"Buttermilk John"	Gill	6:20

== Personnel ==
Credits from European version:

- Vince Gill – lead vocals, electric guitar (1–8, 10–12, 14), acoustic guitar (2–4, 6–15), backing vocals (6, 8, 10), banjo (11), mandolin (11)
- John Hobbs – acoustic piano (1, 3, 6–8, 10, 12–14), keyboards (2), Hammond B3 organ (3–6, 8, 9, 13, 14), accordion (11)
- Pete Wasner – synthesizers, Hammond B3 organ (1, 7), Wurlitzer electric piano (3, 5, 8) acoustic piano (4, 9, 11), Rhodes (4), Wurlitzer organ (10)
- Richard Bennett – acoustic guitar (1, 5, 7, 10, 12, 13), electric guitar (4, 14)
- Tom Bukovac – electric guitar (1, 3–5, 7, 8, 10)
- Al Anderson – electric guitar (2)
- Tom Britt – electric guitar (3, 9, 15)
- Will Owsley – electric guitar (4, 7)
- Andy Riess – electric guitar (15)
- Paul Franklin – steel guitar (1, 2, 10, 12–15), dobro (5)
- Russ Pahl – steel guitar (9)
- Glenn Worf – bass guitar (1, 5, 10)
- Michael Rhodes – bass (2–4, 6, 7, 11–14)
- David Hungate – bass (8, 9)
- Dennis Crouch – upright bass (15)
- Chad Cromwell – drums (1, 3–8, 10, 11)
- Eddie Bayers – drums (2, 12–14)
- Rick Vanaugh – drums (15)
- Eric Darken – percussion
- Larry Franklin – fiddle (12, 13)
- Aubrey Haynie – fiddle (15)
- Kenny Sears – fiddle (15)
- Joe Spivey – fiddle (15)
- Bekka Bramlett – backing vocals (1, 3, 4, 15)
- Jenny Gill – backing vocals (1–7, 9, 10)
- Chris Stapleton – backing vocals (2–4)
- Billy Thomas – backing vocals (2–5, 15), drums (9)
- Amy Grant – backing vocals (4, 8), lead vocals (8)
- Kim Keyes – backing vocals (4)
- Gene Miller – backing vocals (4, 7)
- Dawn Sears – backing vocals (5, 13)
- Jeff White – backing vocals (5, 9, 11, 15)
- Ashley Monroe – backing vocals (6)
- Sarah Chapman – backing vocals (8)
- Andrea Zonn – backing vocals (9, 11), fiddle (11)
- Corrina Gill – backing vocals (9)
- Wes Hightower – backing vocals (12, 13)
- Lee Ann Womack – backing vocals (12)
- Sonya Isaacs – backing vocals (14)
- Sarah Siskind – backing vocals (14)

=== Production ===
- Vince Gill – producer
- John Hobbs – producer
- Justin Niebank – producer, recording, mixing
- Drew Bollman – recording
- Neal Cappellino – additional recording
- Steve Marcantonio – additional recording
- Steve Blackmon – recording assistant
- Matt Rausch – recording assistant
- Jed Hackett – digital editing
- Brian David Willis – digital editing
- Jim DeMain – mastering at Yes Master (Nashville, Tennessee)
- Jenny Gill – production coordinator
- Craig Allen – art direction, design
- Jim White – photography
- Kevin Winter – front cover photography
- Trish Townsend – wardrobe stylist
- Debra Wingo – hair, make-up
- The Fitzgerald Hartley Co. – management

== Chart performance ==
As of December 2015, the album had sold 102,000 copies.

=== Album ===
Chart (2011)	Peak position
US Billboard Top Country Albums	4
US Billboard 200	14

=== Singles ===
Year	Single	Peak positions
Year	Single	US Country
2011	"Threaten Me with Heaven"	42
