= Steuart Smith =

American guitarist

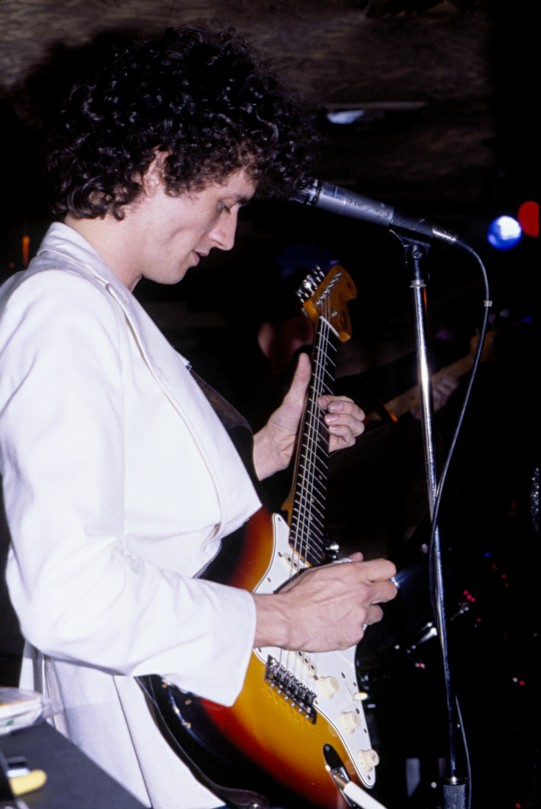
- Smith in 1981

Background information
- Born: June 24, 1952 (age 74); Baltimore, Maryland, U.S.
- Genres: Rock
- Occupations: Musician, producer
- Instruments: Guitar, vocals, bass, keyboards, mandolin
- Formerly of: Eagles

Steuart Smith (born 24 June 1952) is a retired American guitarist and multi-instrumentalist, vocalist, writer and producer from Baltimore, Maryland, United States. He was a touring member of the American rock band Eagles, where he performed as one of the lead guitarists from 2001 to 2025 before retiring from touring due to a diagnosis of parkinsonism.

== Career ==
Smith has recorded and/or toured with many musicians, especially, but not exclusively, country musicians, including Dolly Parton, Rosanne Cash, Wynonna Judd, Terry Clark, Trisha Yearwood, Rodney Crowell, Mary Chapin Carpenter, Don Henley, Patty Smyth, Vince Gill, and Shawn Colvin. Smith has also produced for many musicians, at least partly as a result of encouragement from country music producer and record executive Tony Brown. Hits featuring Smith on lead guitar include Judd's "No One Else on Earth" and Gill's "What the Cowgirls Do", as well as Crowell's 1988 album Diamonds & Dirt.

Smith was also a member of Crowell’s band, Cicadas, which released one album in 1997.

In August 1997, Smith supported singer-songwriter Shawn Colvin as lead guitarist in her trio on Sessions at West 54th, a music program for public television which was taped at Sony Music Studios on West 54th Street in Manhattan.

Smith was hired by the Eagles in 2001 after Don Felder was fired from the band due to legal and monetary disputes. He shared lead guitar duties with Joe Walsh, such as the harmonizing duet in "Hotel California", and (since 2017) Vince Gill. In addition to performing live with the band, he played on and co-wrote several songs on the Eagles' 2007 studio album Long Road Out of Eden, on which he also shared producing duties with the four band members and drummer Scott Crago.

Smith was a member of Don Henley's solo touring band and occasionally played concerts with Glenn Frey. He and Eagles touring drummer Scott Crago were in Henley's touring band for his 2016 world tour.

== Personal life ==
Smith previously lived in Baltimore, Maryland, Arlington, Virginia, and Falls Church, Virginia, but he has since moved to Salem, Massachusetts.
