= Patty Loveless discography =

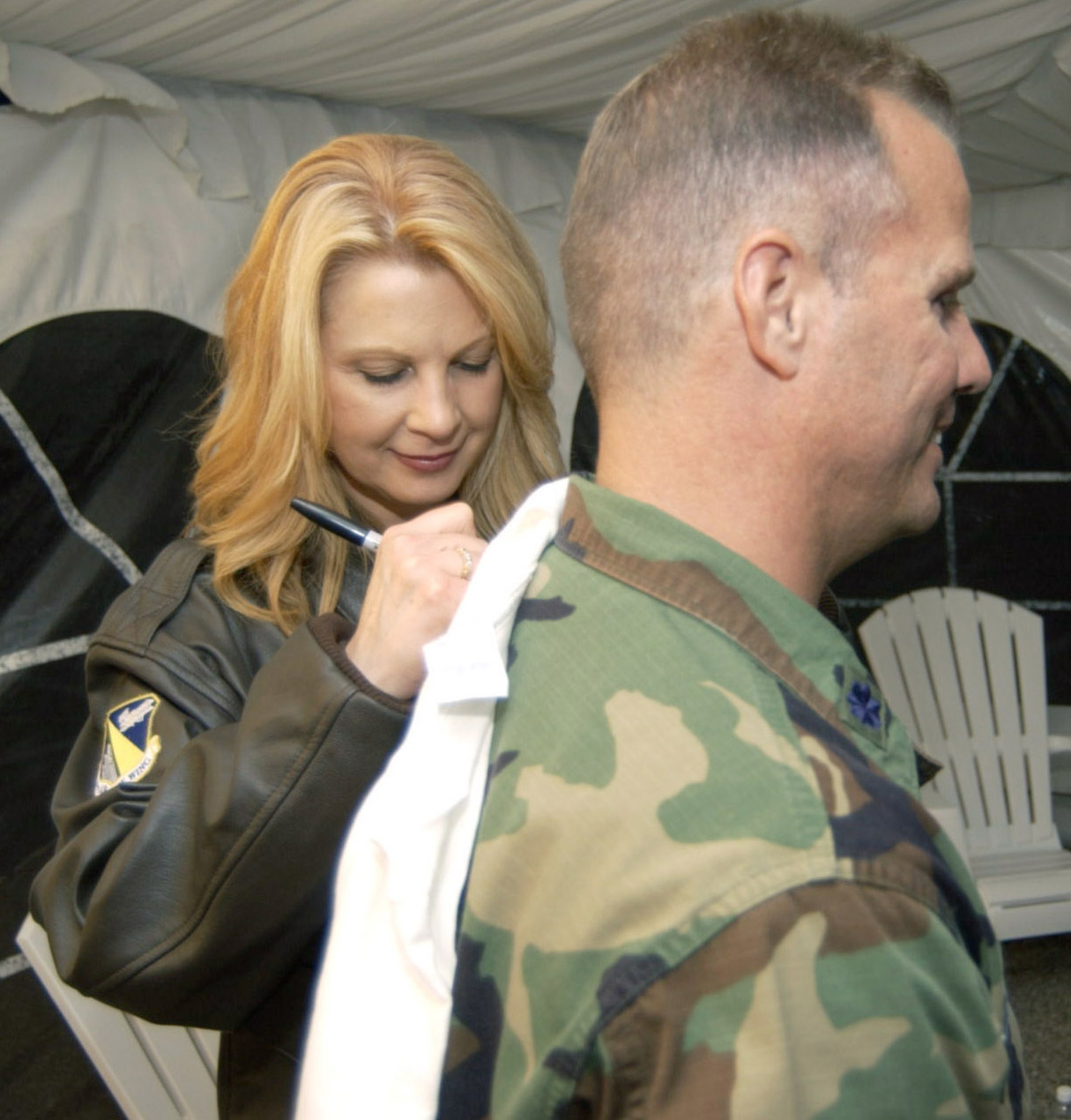
- Patty Loveless signing a shirt at the Wright-Patterson Air Force Base, 2005.
- Studio albums: 16
- Compilation albums: 11
- Singles: 52
- Video albums: 2
- Music videos: 32
- Other appearances: 30

American country music artist Patty Loveless has released 16 studio albums, 11 compilation albums, two video albums and 52 singles. Recording a tape of her own music, Loveless signed her first recording contract with MCA Records in 1985. Her self-titled studio album was released in January 1987 and peaked at number 35 on the Billboard Top Country Albums chart. She followed it with her second studio release, If My Heart Had Windows (1988). It peaked at number 33 on the country albums list and spawned her first major country hits: "If My Heart Had Windows" and "A Little Bit in Love". Her third studio album, Honky Tonk Angel (1988), would certify platinum by the Recording Industry Association of America and produced her first number one country hits, "Timber, I'm Falling in Love" and "Chains". Loveless went on to release the studio albums On Down the Line (1990) and Up Against My Heart (1991). Together, both albums produced three top 10 singles including the number three hit "Hurt Me Bad (In a Real Good Way)".

Loveless signed a new contract with Epic Records and released her sixth studio album, Only What I Feel, in April 1993. Reaching number nine on the Top Country Albums chart, number 66 on the Billboard 200, and certifying platinum, it became one of Loveless's most successful albums. The record spawned multiple hit singles, including the number one hit "Blame It on Your Heart" and the top five single "How Can I Help You Say Goodbye". Her platinum-selling seventh album When Fallen Angels Fly (1994) would also reach the top 10 of the country albums chart. All four of its singles reached the top 10 of the Billboard Hot Country Singles & Tracks chart including, "I Try to Think About Elvis" and "You Don't Even Know Who I Am". Her eighth studio release The Trouble with the Truth (1995) produced two more number-one country hits: "You Can Feel Bad" and "Lonely Too Long". The project would also certify platinum in the United States. Loveless's ninth studio record entitled Long Stretch of Lonesome (1997) peaked at number nine on the Top Country Albums chart and produced a top-20 hit featuring George Jones. In 1999, Loveless released her first compilation album entitled Classics, which would certify gold in the United States. Following the release of her 10th studio album, Loveless followed in 2001 with the Bluegrass-flavored Mountain Soul. Critically acclaimed, it was followed by a similarly styled holiday album in 2002. Her 13th studio album, On Your Way Home (2003), peaked at number seven on the country albums chart and produced the top 20 hit, "Lovin' All Night". After the release of her fourteenth studio effort, Loveless signed a contract with Saguaro Road Records. She then issued Sleepless Nights (2008), her fifteenth studio album. Her most recent studio album, Mountain Soul II (2009), reached number 19 on the Top Country Albums chart.

== Albums ==
=== Studio albums ===
List of albums, with selected chart positions and certifications, showing all relevant details
Title	Album details	Peak chart positions				Certifications
Title	Album details	US	US Cou.	US Blu.	CAN Cou.	Certifications
Patty Loveless	Released: January 1987; Label: MCA; Format: LP, cassette, CD	—	35	—	—	
If My Heart Had Windows	Released: January 25, 1988; Label: MCA; Format: LP, cassette, CD	—	33	—	—	
Honky Tonk Angel	Released: October 1, 1988; Label: MCA; Format: LP, cassette, CD	—	7	—	9	MC: Gold; RIAA: Platinum
On Down the Line	Released: May 15, 1990; Label: MCA; Format: LP, cassette, CD	—	12	—	—	RIAA: Gold
Up Against My Heart	Released: September 3, 1991; Label: MCA; Format: Cassette, CD	151	27	—	—	
Only What I Feel	Released: April 20, 1993; Label: Epic; Format: Cassette, CD	63	9	—	—	MC: Gold; RIAA: Platinum
When Fallen Angels Fly	Released: August 23, 1994; Label: Epic; Format: Cassette, CD	60	8	—	—	MC: Platinum; RIAA: Platinum
The Trouble with the Truth	Released: January 23, 1996; Label: Epic; Format: Cassette, CD	86	10	—	16	MC: Gold; RIAA: Platinum
Long Stretch of Lonesome	Released: September 30, 1997; Label: Epic; Format: Cassette, CD	68	9	—	31	MC: Gold; RIAA: Gold
Strong Heart	Released: August 29, 2000; Label: Epic; Format: Cassette, CD	126	13	—	24	
Mountain Soul	Released: June 26, 2001; Label: Epic; Format: Cassette, CD	159	19	5	—	
Bluegrass & White Snow: A Mountain Christmas	Released: October 29, 2002; Label: Epic; Format: Cassette, CD	172	20	2	—	
On Your Way Home	Released: September 16, 2003; Label: Epic; Format: Cassette, CD	77	7	—	—	
Dreamin' My Dreams	Released: September 13, 2005; Label: Epic; Format: CD, music download	175	29	—	—	
Sleepless Nights	Released: September 9, 2008; Label: Saguaro Road; Format: CD, music download	86	13	—	—	
Mountain Soul II	Released: September 29, 2009; Label: Saguaro Road; Format: CD, music download	91	19	1	—	
"—" denotes a recording that did not chart or was not released in that territory.

=== Compilation albums ===
List of albums, with selected chart positions and certifications, showing all relevant details
Title	Album details	Peak chart positions		Certifications
Title	Album details	US	US Cou.	Certifications
Greatest Hits	Released: May 11, 1993; Label: MCA; Format: Cassette, CD	—	60	RIAA: Gold
Patty Loveless Sings Songs of Love	Released: May 14, 1996; Label: MCA Special Products; Format: Cassette, CD	—	—	
The Patty Loveless Collection	Released: 1996; Label: Sony Special Markets; Formats: CD	—	—	
Classics	Released: March 23, 1999; Label: Epic; Format: Cassette, CD	99	6	RIAA: Gold
20th Century Masters: The Millennium Collection	Released: August 15, 2000; Label: MCA Nashville; Format: Cassette, CD	—	—	
The Definitive Collection	Released: June 7, 2005; Label: MCA Nashville; Format: CD	—	—	
16 Biggest Hits	Released: March 27, 2007; Label: Columbia/Epic/Legacy; Format: CD, music download	—	—	
Super Hits	Released: March 25, 2008; Label: Sony BMG Special Markets; Format: CD	—	—	
Icon	Released: October 24, 2011; Label: MCA Nashville; Format: CD	—	—	
Country: Patty Loveless	Released: September 4, 2012; Label: BMG/Sony; Format: CD	—	—	
Playlist: The Very Best of Patty Loveless	Released: May 21, 2013; Label: Epic; Format: CD	—	—	
"—" denotes a recording that did not chart or was not released in that territory.

== Singles ==
=== As lead artist ===
List of singles, with selected chart positions, showing other relevant details
Title	Year	Peak chart positions			Album
Title	Year	US	US Cou.	CAN Cou.	Album
"Lonely Days, Lonely Nights"	1985	—	46	—	Patty Loveless
"Wicked Ways"	1986	—	49	50	Patty Loveless
"I Did"	1987	—	56	—	Patty Loveless
"After All"	1987	—	43	—	Patty Loveless
"You Saved Me"	1987	—	43	—	If My Heart Had Windows
"If My Heart Had Windows"	1988	—	10	9	If My Heart Had Windows
"A Little Bit in Love"	1988	—	2	—	If My Heart Had Windows
"Blue Side of Town"	1988	—	4	7	Honky Tonk Angel
"Don't Toss Us Away"	1989	—	5	5	Honky Tonk Angel
"Timber, I'm Falling in Love"	1989	—	1	1	Honky Tonk Angel
"The Lonely Side of Love"	1989	—	6	5	Honky Tonk Angel
"Chains"	1989	—	1	1	Honky Tonk Angel
"On Down the Line"	1990	—	5	3	On Down the Line
"The Night's Too Long"	1990	—	20	4	On Down the Line
"I'm That Kind of Girl"	1991	—	5	48	On Down the Line
"Blue Memories"	1991	—	22	20	On Down the Line
"Hurt Me Bad (In a Real Good Way)"	1991	—	3	6	Up Against My Heart
"Jealous Bone"	1992	—	13	22	Up Against My Heart
"Can't Stop Myself from Loving You"	1992	—	30	31	Up Against My Heart
"Blame It on Your Heart"	1993	— (Note: "Blame It on Your Heart" did not enter the Hot 100, but peaked at number 12 on Bubbling Under Hot 100 Singles, which acts as a 25-song extension of the Hot 100.)	1	2	Only What I Feel
"Nothin' but the Wheel"	1993	—	20	23	Only What I Feel
"You Will"	1993	—	6	43	Only What I Feel
"How Can I Help You Say Goodbye"	1994	—	3	19	Only What I Feel
"I Try to Think About Elvis"	1994	— (Note: "I Try to Think About Elvis" did not enter the Hot 100, but peaked at number 15 on Bubbling Under Hot 100 Singles, which acts as a 25-song extension of the Hot 100.)	3	12	When Fallen Angels Fly
"Here I Am"	1994	—	4	11	When Fallen Angels Fly
"You Don't Even Know Who I Am"	1995	— (Note: "You Don't Even Know Who I Am" did not enter the Hot 100, but peaked at number 17 on Bubbling Under Hot 100 Singles, which acts as a 25-song extension of the Hot 100.)	5	17	When Fallen Angels Fly
"Halfway Down"	1995	—	6	16	When Fallen Angels Fly
"You Can Feel Bad"	1995	—	1	1	The Trouble with the Truth
"A Thousand Times a Day"	1996	—	13	27	The Trouble with the Truth
"Lonely Too Long"	1996	—	1	3	The Trouble with the Truth
"She Drew a Broken Heart"	1996	—	4	2	The Trouble with the Truth
"The Trouble with the Truth"	1997	—	15	24	The Trouble with the Truth
"You Don't Seem to Miss Me" (with George Jones)	1997	— (Note: "You Don't Seem to Miss Me" did not enter the Hot 100, but peaked at number 9 on Bubbling Under Hot 100 Singles, which acts as a 25-song extension of the Hot 100.)	14	37	Long Stretch of Lonesome
"To Have You Back Again"	1998	—	12	17	Long Stretch of Lonesome
"High on Love"	1998	—	20	22	Long Stretch of Lonesome
"Like Water into Wine"	1998	—	57	54	Long Stretch of Lonesome
"Can't Get Enough"	1999	96	21	8	Classics
"My Kind of Woman/My Kind of Man" (with Vince Gill)	1999	— (Note: "My Kind of Woman/My Kind of Man" did not enter the Hot 100, but peaked at number 16 on Bubbling Under Hot 100 Singles, which acts as a 25-song extension of the Hot 100.)	27	23	Classics
"That's the Kind of Mood I'm In"	2000	71	13	—	Strong Heart
"The Last Thing on My Mind"	2000	— (Note: "The Last Thing on My Mind" did not enter the Hot 100, but peaked at number 14 on Bubbling Under Hot 100 Singles, which acts as a 25-song extension of the Hot 100.)	20	—	Strong Heart
"Strong Heart"	2001	—	—	—	Strong Heart
"The Boys Are Back in Town"	2001	—	—	—	Mountain Soul
"Out of Control Raging Fire" (with Travis Tritt)	2002	—	—	—	Mountain Soul
"Lovin' All Night"	2003	81	18	—	On Your Way Home
"On Your Way Home"	2003	—	29	—	On Your Way Home
"I Wanna Believe"	2004	—	60	—	On Your Way Home
"Keep Your Distance"	2005	—	—	—	Dreamin' My Dreams
"Why Baby Why"	2008	—	—	—	Sleepless Nights
"Busted"	2009	—	—	—	Mountain Soul II
"Drive"	2010	—	—	—	Non-album single
"—" denotes a recording that did not chart or was not released in that territory.

=== As a featured artist ===
List of singles, with selected chart positions, showing other relevant details
Title	Year	Peak chart positions		Album
Title	Year	US Cou.	CAN Cou.	Album
"Send a Message to My Heart" (Dwight Yoakam with Patty Loveless)	1992	47	30	If There Was a Way
"Same Old Train" (credited with various artists) (Note: All-star collaboration featuring Clint Black, Joe Diffie, Merle Haggard, Emmylou Harris, Alison Krauss, Patty Loveless, Earl Scruggs, Ricky Skaggs, Marty Stuart, Pam Tillis, Randy Travis, Travis Tritt and Dwight Yoakam.)	1998	59	—	Tribute to Tradition
"—" denotes a recording that did not chart or was not released in that territory.

== Other charted songs ==
List of songs, with selected chart positions, showing other relevant details
Title	Year	Peak chart positions	Album
Title	Year	US Country Digital	Album
"You'll Never Leave Harlan Alive"	2022	16	Mountain Soul

== Videography ==
=== Video albums ===
List of albums, showing all relevant details
Title	Album details
Greatest Hits	Released: May 11, 1993; Label: MCA; Formats: VHS
Montana Christmas Skies (John Denver with Clint Black, Kathy Mattea and Patty Loveless)	Released: 1996; Label: LaserLight; Formats: VHS

=== Lead music videos ===
List of music videos, showing year released and director
Title	Year	Director(s)	Ref.
"If My Heart Had Windows"	1988	William Pope	
"Don't Toss Us Away"	1988	Jim May	
"Chains"	1989	John Lloyd Miller	
"The Night's Too Long"	1990	John Lloyd Miller	
"I'm That Kind of Girl"	1990	John Lloyd Miller	
"Hurt Me Bad (In a Real Good Way)"	1991	John Lloyd Miller	
"Jealous Bone"	1991	John Lloyd Miller	
"Blame It on Your Heart"	1993	Sherman Halsey	
"Nothin' But the Wheel"	1993	Randee St. Nicholas	
"How Can I Help You Say Goodbye"	1994	Jim Shea	
"I Try to Think About Elvis"	1994	John Lloyd Miller	
"Here I Am"	1994	John Lloyd Miller	
"You Don't Even Know Who I Am"	1995	Jim Shea	
"A Thousand Times a Day"	1996	Nigel Dick	
"Lonely Too Long"	1996	Gerry Wenner	
"The Trouble with the Truth"	1997	Gerry Wenner	
"You Don't Seem to Miss Me"	1997	Gerry Wenner	
"Like Water into Wine"	1998	Deaton-Flanigen	
"Can't Get Enough"	1999	Thom Oliphant	
"My Kind of Woman/My Kind of Man" (with Vince Gill)	1999	not available	
"That's the Kind of Mood I'm In"	2000	Gerry Wenner	
"The Last Thing on My Mind"	2000	Trey Fanjoy	
"The Boys Are Back in Town"	2001	David McClister	
"Out of Control Raging Fire" (with Travis Tritt)	2001	Brent Hedgecock	
"Lovin' All Night"	2003	Roger Pistole	
"On Your Way Home"	2004	Roger Pistole	
"Keep Your Distance"	2005	Traci Goudie	
"Crazy Arms"	2008	Roger Pistole	
"Busted"	2010	Ryan Newman	

=== Collaborative and featured music videos ===
List of music videos, showing year released and director
Title	Year	Director(s)	Ref.
"I Don't Need Your Rockin' Chair" (with credited as "George Jones and Friends")	1992	Marc Ball	
"He Thinks He'll Keep Her" (Mary Chapin Carpenter with Suzy Bogguss, Emmylou Harris, Patty Loveless, Kathy Mattea, Pam Tillis, and Trisha Yearwood)	1994	Bud Schaetzle	
"Back in the Saddle" (Matraca Berg with Suzy Bogguss, Faith Hill, Patty Loveless, Martina McBride, and Trisha Yearwood)	1998	Steven Goldmann	

== Other appearances ==
List of non-single guest appearances, with other performing artists, showing year released and album name
Title	Year	Other artist(s)	Album	Ref.
"When I Call Your Name"	1989	Vince Gill	When I Call Your Name	
"I'll Never Grow Tired of You"	1992	Ralph Stanley	Saturday Night & Sunday Morning	
"So Many Questions, So Little Time"	1992	—N/a	Country Music for Kids	
"The Rainbow Down the Road"	1994	Radney Foster	Maverick (soundtrack)	
"Rockin' Around the Christmas Tree"	1994	Alvin and the Chipmunks	A Very Merry Chipmunk	
"Nothin' But Love"	1995	—N/a	America's Music: The Roots of Country	
"Blue Side of Town" (Live)	1996	—N/a	The Best of Austin City Limits: Country Music's Finest Hour	
"Every Kinda People"	1996	Amy Grant	One Voice: An Olympic Album	
"Where Are You Boy"	1996	—N/a	Tin Cup (soundtrack)	
"If That's the Way You Feel"	1998	Ralph Stanley	Clinch Mountain Country	
"I Surrender"	1998	Suzy Bogguss	Nobody Love, Nobody Gets Hurt	
"Two Coats"	1998	—N/a	The Apostle (soundtrack)	
"Please Remember Me"	1999	Tim McGraw	A Place in the Sun	
"Back Street Affair"	1999	John Prine	In Spite of Ourselves	
"Close By"	2000	Ricky Skaggs	Big Mon: The Songs of Bill Monroe	
"Sounds of Loneliness"	2001	—N/a	Songcatcher (soundtrack)	
"Three Little Babies"	2003	The Chieftains	Further Down the Old Plank Road	
"Out of My Mind"	2005	Vince Gill	These Days	
"You're the Kind of Trouble"	2006	Solomon Burke	Nashville	
"The Answer's in the Question"	2006	Bob Seger	Face the Promise	
"Far Side Banks of Jordan"	2007	Kris Kristofferson	Anchored in Love: A Tribute to June Carter Cash	
"Precious Memories"	2008	—N/a	How Great Thou Art: Gospel Favorites from the Grand Ole Opry	
"House of Cash"	2008	George Strait	Troubadour	
"No Good for Me"	2008	Jimmy Wayne	Do You Believe Me Now	
"Love Don't Let Me Down"	2010	Chris Young	Country Strong (soundtrack)	
"Dear Diamond"	2011	Miranda Lambert	Four the Record	
"You're Through Fooling Me"	2011	—N/a	The Lost Notebooks of Hank Williams	
"American Middle Class"	2014	Angaleena Presley	American Middle Class	
"Straightjacket Love"	2016	Elizabeth Cook	Exodus of Venus	
"Bible and a .44"	2019	Trisha Yearwood	Every Girl	
"Dear Miss Loretta"	2021	Carly Pearce	29: Written in Stone	
