= Greatest Hits (Patty Loveless album) =

Greatest hits album by Patty Loveless
- Released: May 11, 1993
- Recorded: 1987–1991
- Genre: Country
- Length: 31:08
- Label: MCA
- Producers: Tony Brown; Emory Gordy Jr.

Patty Loveless chronology
Up Against My Heart (1991)	Greatest Hits (1993)	Only What I Feel (1993)

Professional ratings
Review scores
Source	Rating
Allmusic	link

Greatest Hits is the first compilation album by American country music artist Patty Loveless. The album was released in 1993 shortly after Loveless left MCA for Epic Records and it contains 10 of her 12 top 20 hits on MCA Records. An accompanying VHS tape of music videos was released in conjunction with this album. The album was certified Gold for shipments of over 500,000 copies in the U.S.

== Track listing ==
No.	Title	Writer(s)	Length
1.	"If My Heart Had Windows"	Dallas Frazier	3:02
2.	"Blue Side of Town"	Hank DeVito, Paul Kennerley	3:19
3.	"Don't Toss Us Away"	Bryan MacLean	4:11
4.	"Timber, I'm Falling in Love"	Kostas	2:30
5.	"The Lonely Side of Love"	Kostas	3:02
6.	"Chains"	Hal Bynum, Bud Reneau	2:27
7.	"On Down the Line"	Kostas	3:10
8.	"I'm That Kind of Girl"	Matraca Berg, Ronnie Samoset	3:06
9.	"Hurt Me Bad (In a Real Good Way)"	Deborah Allen, Rafe Van Hoy	3:00
10.	"Jealous Bone"	Rick Giles, Steve Bogard	3:21

== Chart performance ==
Chart (1993)	Peak position
U.S. Billboard Top Country Albums	60

== Credits ==
- Tony Brown – producer
- Emory Gordy Jr. – producer (1, 9, 10)
- Milan Bogdan – digital editing
- Glenn Meadows – mastering
- Masterfonics (Nashville, Tennessee) – editing and mastering location
- Jim Kemp – creative director
- Virginia Team – art direction
- Jerry Joyner – design
- Randee St. Nicholas – photography
- Fitzgerald / Hartley Co. – management
