= List of awards and nominations received by Patty Loveless =

Patty Loveless awards and nominations
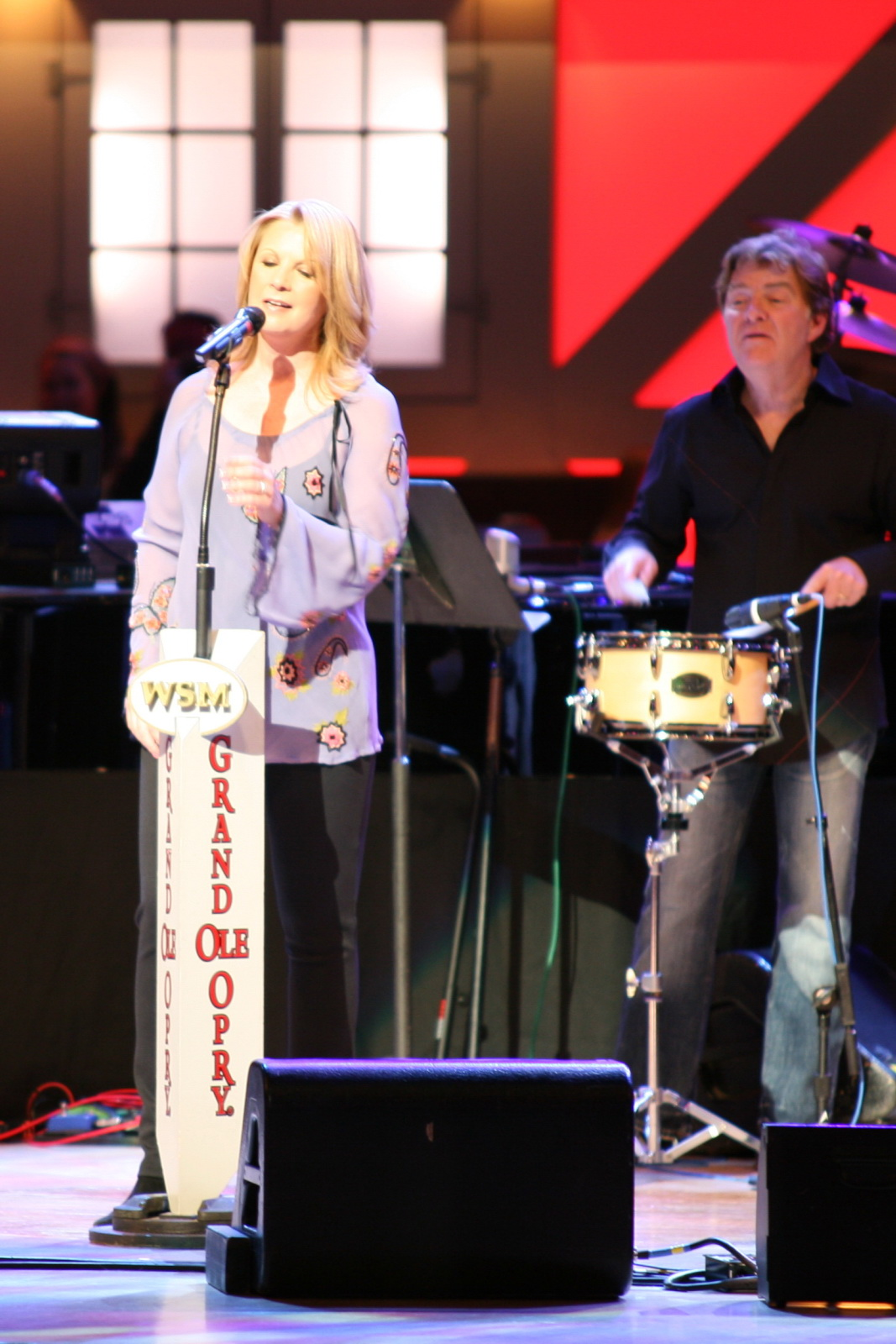
- Loveless in 2007
Awards and nominations
Award	Wins	Nominations
Country Music Association	5	20
Academy of Country Music	2	18
Grammy Awards	2	13
American Music Awards	1	1

Totals (Note: Certain award groups do not simply award one winner. They acknowledge several different recipients, have runners-up, and have third place. Since this is a specific recognition and is different from losing an award, runner-up mentions are considered wins in this award tally. For simplification and to avoid errors, each award in this list has been presumed to have had a prior nomination.)
- Wins: 10
- Nominations: 37

American country music singer Patty Loveless has received five Country Music Association awards, two Academy of Country Music awards, one American Music Award and two Grammy Awards.

Her first award nomination was in 1985, when the Academy of Country Music nominated her as Top New Female Vocalist. Three years later, the Country Music Association nominated her for the Horizon Award (now the Best New Artist award). In 1998, she was one of several featured vocalists on the collaborative track "Same Old Train" from the album A Tribute to Tradition, which won the Grammy Award for Best Country Collaboration with Vocals. In 2011, she received a second Grammy, this time for Best Bluegrass Album for Mountain Soul II.

== American Music Awards ==
Year	Nominee / work	Award	Result	Ref.
1989	Patty Loveless	Favorite New Country Artist	Won	
1991	Patty Loveless	Favorite Country Female Artist	Nominated	

== Academy of Country Music Awards ==
Year	Nominee / work	Award	Result	Ref.
1985	Patty Loveless	Top New Female Vocalist	Nominated	
1989	"Timber, I'm Falling in Love"	Single Record of the Year	Nominated	
1990	Patty Loveless	Top Female Vocalist	Nominated	
1992	"Send a Message to My Heart" (with Dwight Yoakam)	Top Vocal Duet	Nominated	
1994	"How Can I Help You Say Goodbye"	Video of the Year	Nominated	
1994	"How Can I Help You Say Goodbye"	Song of the Year	Nominated	
1994	Patty Loveless	Top Female Vocalist	Nominated	
1995	Patty Loveless	Top Female Vocalist	Won	
1995	"You Don't Even Know Who I Am"	Song of the Year	Nominated	
1995	When Fallen Angels Fly	Album of the Year	Nominated	
1996	Patty Loveless	Top Female Vocalist	Won	
1996	The Trouble with the Truth	Album of the Year	Nominated	
1997	"You Don't Seem to Miss Me" (with George Jones)	Vocal Event of the Year	Nominated	
1997	Patty Loveless	Top Female Vocalist	Nominated	
1997	Long Stretch of Lonesome	Album of the Year	Nominated	
1998	"Same Old Train" (credited with various artists)	Vocal Event of the Year	Nominated	
1999	"My Kind of Woman/My Kind of Man" (with Vince Gill)	Vocal Event of the Year	Nominated	
2001	"Out of Control Raging Fire" (with Travis Tritt)	Vocal Event of the Year	Nominated	
2003	Patty Loveless	Top Female Vocalist of the Year	Nominated	

== Country Music Association Awards ==
Year	Nominee / work	Award	Result	Ref.
1988	Patty Loveless	Horizon Award	Nominated	
1989	Patty Loveless	Horizon Award	Nominated	
1989	Patty Loveless	Female Vocalist of the Year	Nominated	
1991	Patty Loveless	Female Vocalist of the Year	Nominated	
1993	"I Don't Need Your Rockin' Chair" (George Jones with various artists)	Vocal Event of the Year	Won	
1994	"How Can I Help You Say Goodbye"	Music Video of the Year	Nominated	
1994	"How Can I Help You Say Goodbye"	Single of the Year	Nominated	
1995	When Fallen Angels Fly	Album of the Year	Won	
1995	Patty Loveless	Female Vocalist of the Year	Nominated	
1996	The Trouble with the Truth	Album of the Year	Nominated	
1996	Patty Loveless	Female Vocalist of the Year	Won	
1997	Patty Loveless	Female Vocalist of the Year	Nominated	
1998	Long Stretch of Lonesome	Album of the Year	Nominated	
1998	Patty Loveless	Female Vocalist of the Year	Nominated	
1998	"You Don't Seem to Miss Me"	Single of the Year	Nominated	
1998	"You Don't Seem to Miss Me"	Vocal Event of the Year	Won	
1999	"My Kind of Woman/My Kind of Man" (with Vince Gill)	Vocal Event of the Year	Won	
1999	"Same Old Train" (with credited with various artists)	Vocal Event of the Year	Nominated	
2003	Patty Loveless	Female Vocalist of the Year	Nominated	

== Grammy Awards ==
Year	Nominee / work	Award	Result	Ref.
1995	"How Can I Help You Say Goodbye"	Best Female Country Vocal Performance	Nominated	
1996	"You Don't Even Know Who I Am"	Best Female Country Vocal Performance	Nominated	
1997	The Trouble with the Truth	Best Country Album	Nominated	
1998	"The Trouble with the Truth"	Best Female Country Vocal Performance	Nominated	
1998	"You Don't Seem to Miss Me" (with George Jones)	Best Country Collaboration with Vocals	Nominated	
1998	Long Stretch of Lonesome	Best Country Album	Nominated	
1999	"Same Old Train" (with various artists)	Best Country Collaboration with Vocals	Won	
1999	"My Kind of Woman/My Kind of Man" (with Vince Gill)	Best Country Collaboration with Vocals	Nominated	
2002	Mountain Soul	Best Bluegrass Album	Nominated	
2004	"On Your Way Home"	Best Female Country Vocal Performance	Nominated	
2009	"House of Cash" (with George Strait)	Best Country Collaboration with Vocals	Nominated	
2009	Sleepless Nights	Best Country Album	Nominated	
2011	Mountain Soul II	Best Bluegrass Album	Won	
