= If My Heart Had Windows =

If My Heart Had Windows may refer to:

- "If My Heart Had Windows" (song), a 1967 single release by George Jones
- If My Heart Had Windows (George Jones album), Jones's 1967 album featuring the above song
- If My Heart Had Windows (Patty Loveless album), a 1988 album by Patty Loveless, featuring her cover of the above song
