= On Our Way Home =

On Our Way Home may refer to:

- "On Our Way Home", original title of the 1969 Beatles song "Two of Us"
- "On Our Way Home", a 2017 song by Empire of the Sun

== See also ==
- On Your Way Home, 2003 album by Patti Loveless
