= Mountain Soul II =

Studio album by Patty Loveless
- Released: September 29, 2009
- Genres: Bluegrass, Country
- Length: 43:18
- Label: Saguaro Road
- Producer: Emory Gordy, Jr.

Patty Loveless chronology
| Sleepless Nights (2008) | Mountain Soul II (2009) |

Singles from Mountain Soul II
- 1. "Busted" Released: September 2009

Music video
- "Busted" on YouTube

Professional ratings
Aggregate scores
| Source | Rating |
|---|---|
| Metacritic | (83/100) |
Review scores
| Source | Rating |
| Allmusic | 4/5 stars |
| BBC Music | (favourable) |
| Billboard | (favourable) |
| PopMatters | 8/10 stars |
| Slant Magazine | 3.5/5 stars |
| Uncut | 4/5 stars |
| The Washington Post | (favorable) |

Mountain Soul II is the sixteenth studio album by American country music singer Patty Loveless. The album was released on September 29, 2009. It is a follow-up to her previous album, Mountain Soul, released in 2001. Four of the album's 15 songs, "Half Over You"; "Blue Memories"; "Feelings of Love"; and "A Handful of Dust", were previously recorded by Loveless on earlier albums. "Big Chance" was also previously included in the same form on 2005's Dreamin' My Dreams.

"Busted" was released as the album's lead-off single in September 2009. The album won the Grammy Award for Best Bluegrass Album at the 2011 Grammy Awards in Los Angeles.

== Track listing ==
1. "Busted" (Harlan Howard) – 3:25
2. "Fools Thin Air" (Guy Clark, Rodney Crowell) – 3:24
3. "A Handful of Dust" (Tony Arata) – 3:05
4. "Half Over You" (Karen Staley) – 3:25
5. "Prisoner's Tears" (Mike Henderson, Mark Irwin, Wally Wilson) – 3:56
6. "Working on a Building" (traditional) – 2:52
7. "Friends in Gloryland" (traditional) – 1:25
8. "(We Are All) Children of Abraham" (Patty Loveless, Emory Gordy Jr.) – 2:24
9. "Big Chance" (Loveless, Gordy) – 2:53
10. "When the Last Curtain Falls" (Gordy, Jim Rushing) – 3:49
11. "Blue Memories" (Karen Brooks, Paul Kennerley) – 2:47
12. "You Burned the Bridge" (Jon Randall) – 4:19
13. "Bramble and the Rose" (Barbara Keith) – 2:54
14. "Feelings of Love" (Kostas) – 3:15
15. "Diamond in My Crown" (Kennerley, Emmylou Harris) – 2:45

== Personnel ==
- Mike Auldridge – dobro
- Barry Bales – upright bass
- Tom Britt – electric guitar
- Mike Bub – upright bass
- Jason Carter – fiddle
- Stuart Duncan – fiddle, mandolin
- Vince Gill – acoustic guitar, background vocals
- Emmylou Harris – background vocals
- Tim Hensley – background vocals
- Rebecca Lynn Howard – acoustic guitar, background vocals
- Rob Ickes – dobro
- Carl Jackson – banjo, background vocals
- Butch Lee – pump organ
- Patty Loveless – lead vocals, background vocals
- Del McCoury – acoustic guitar, background vocals
- Rob McCoury – banjo
- Ronnie McCoury – mandolin, mandola, background vocals
- Carmella Ramsey – background vocals
- Jon Randall – mandolin, background vocals
- Deanie Richardson – fiddle
- Kerlan Spur – percussion
- Bryan Sutton – banjo, acoustic guitar, mandolin
- Guthrie Trapp – electric guitar
- Rhonda Vincent – background vocals

== Chart performance ==
| Chart (2009) | Peak position |
|---|---|
| U.S. Billboard Top Bluegrass Albums | 1 |
| U.S. Billboard Top Country Albums | 19 |
| U.S. Billboard 200 | 91 |
