= Up Against My Heart =

Studio album by Patty Loveless
- Released: September 3, 1991
- Studios: Emerald Sound Studios and Sound Stage Studios (Nashville, Tennessee)
- Genres: Neotraditional country; Progressive country
- Length: 31:25
- Label: MCA
- Producers: Emory Gordy Jr.; Tony Brown

Patty Loveless chronology
On Down the Line (1990)	Up Against My Heart (1991)	Greatest Hits (1993)

Singles from Up Against My Heart
- 1. "Hurt Me Bad (In a Real Good Way)" Released: September 7, 1991; 2. "Jealous Bone" Released: January 14, 1992; 3. "Can't Stop Myself from Loving You" Released: April 25, 1992

Professional ratings
Review scores
Source	Rating
AllMusic	3/5 stars
Chicago Tribune	3/4 stars
Robert Christgau	(1-star Honorable Mention)
Entertainment Weekly	A+
Los Angeles Times	2.5/4 stars

Up Against My Heart is the fifth studio album by American country music artist Patty Loveless. It was her final studio album for MCA Records. The album produced the singles "Hurt Me Bad (In a Real Good Way)", "Jealous Bone" and "Can't Stop Myself from Loving You".

== Musical style and composition ==
Up Against My Heart has been described as a neotraditional country and progressive country album with elements of country rock. It has been compared to the works of traditional country musicians Loretta Lynn and Emmylou Harris.

== Track listing ==
No.	Title	Writer(s)	Length
1.	"Jealous Bone"	Rick Giles, Steve Bogard	3:17
2.	"Nobody Loves You Like I Do"	Kostas	2:52
3.	"I Already Miss You (Like You're Already Gone)"	Jim Rushing, Allen Shamblin	3:37
4.	"Hurt Me Bad (In a Real Good Way)"	Deborah Allen, Rafe Van Hoy	3:00
5.	"If You Don't Want Me"	Monte Warden, Emory Gordy Jr.	3:10
6.	"I Came Straight to You"	Kevin Welch, John Barlow Jarvis	2:43
7.	"If It's the Last Thing I Do"	Phyllis Austin, Doug Gill	3:30
8.	"Can't Stop Myself from Loving You"	Kostas, Dean Folkvord	3:21
9.	"Waitin' for the Phone to Ring"	Joe Tassi, Bob Tassi	2:38
10.	"God Will"	Lyle Lovett	2:47

== Personnel ==
As listed in liner notes

Musicians

- Patty Loveless – lead vocals, harmony vocals (10)
- John Barlow Jarvis – keyboards
- Steve Gibson – acoustic guitar, electric guitars, mandolin (6)
- Mac McAnally – acoustic guitar, harmony vocals (6, 9, 10)
- Steuart Smith – acoustic guitar, electric guitars
- Jerry Douglas – dobro
- Paul Franklin – steel guitar
- Stuart Duncan – mandolin, fiddle
- Emory Gordy Jr. – bass
- Larrie Londin – drums
- Tim Hensley – harmony vocals (2, 3, 7)
- Tammy Steffey – harmony vocals (2, 3, 7)
- Deborah Allen – harmony vocals (4)
- Vince Gill – harmony vocals (6, 10)
- Dolly Parton – harmony vocals (9)
- Lyle Lovett – harmony vocals (10)

Production

- Tony Brown – producer
- Emory Gordy Jr. – producer
- John Guess – digital recording, overdub recording, mixing
- Russ Martin – second mix engineer
- Milan Bogdan – digital editing
- Glenn Meadows – mastering at Masterfonics (Nashville, Tennessee)
- Jessie Noble – project coordinator
- Simon Levy – art direction, design
- Randee St. Nicholas – photography
- Mary Beth Felts – make-up
- Sheri McCoy – styling
- Fitzgerald / Hartley Co. – management

== Chart performance ==
Chart (1991)	Peak position
US Billboard 200	151
US Top Country Albums (Billboard)	27
