= On Down the Line =

Studio album by Patty Loveless
- Released: May 15, 1990
- Recorded: December 1989-January 1990
- Genre: Country
- Label: MCA
- Producer: Tony Brown

Patty Loveless chronology
Honky Tonk Angel (1988)	On Down the Line (1990)	Up Against My Heart (1991)

Singles from On Down the Line
- 1. "On Down the Line" Released: May 19, 1990; 2. "The Night's Too Long" Released: September 23, 1990; 3. "I'm That Kind of Girl" Released: January 12, 1991; 4. "Blue Memories" Released: May 11, 1991

Professional ratings
Review scores
Source	Rating
AllMusic	link
Chicago Tribune	link
Entertainment Weekly	B+ link
Los Angeles Times	link
Orlando Sentinel	4/5 stars

On Down the Line is the fourth studio album by American country music artist Patty Loveless. Recorded in Nashville, Tennessee during December 1989/January 1990, it was the follow-up to her breakthrough album, Honky Tonk Angel.

The album was both a critical and commercial success for Loveless, producing two top 10 hits, "On Down the Line" and "I'm That Kind of Girl", and a top 20 hit, "The Night's Too Long". It peaked at No. 12 on the Billboard Top Country Albums chart.

== Track listing ==
No.	Title	Writer(s)	Length
1.	"Overtime"	Kostas	2:48
2.	"The Night's Too Long"	Lucinda Williams	3:53
3.	"Blue Memories"	Paul Kennerley, Karen Brooks	2:49
4.	"Some Morning Soon"	Claire Lynch, Larry Lynch	3:38
5.	"You Can't Run Away from Your Heart"	Wendy Waldman, Jim Photoglo	3:52
6.	"On Down the Line"	Kostas	3:05
7.	"I've Got to Stop Loving You (And Start Living Again)"	Kennerley	3:19
8.	"Looking in the Eyes of Love"	Kostas, Tricia Walker	4:01
9.	"I'm That Kind of Girl"	Matraca Berg, Ronnie Samoset	3:02
10.	"Feelings of Love"	Kostas	3:21

== Personnel ==
- Richard Bennett - electric guitar on "I'm That Kind of Girl"
- Paul Franklin - Dobro, steel guitar, acoustic slide guitar
- John Barlow Jarvis - keyboards, piano
- Kostas - acoustic guitar on "On Down the Line"
- Albert Lee - electric guitar
- Larrie Londin - drums
- Mac McAnally - acoustic guitar, electric guitar
- Mark O'Connor - fiddle, mandolin
- Leland Sklar - bass guitar

Background vocals

- Vince Gill - background vocals (tracks 1, 3, 5–7)
- Kostas - background vocals (tracks 1, 8, 10)
- Claire Lynch - background vocals (tracks 1, 4, 7)
- Russell Smith - background vocals (track 2)
- Karen Staley - background vocals (track 4)
- Harry Stinson - background vocals (track 3)

Note: Track 9 does not feature backing vocals.

Technical

- Chuck Ainlay - recording
- Tony Brown - producer
- John Guess - mixing
- Glenn Meadows - mastering

== Charts ==
=== Weekly charts ===
Chart (1990)	Peak position
US Top Country Albums (Billboard)	12

=== Year-end charts ===
Chart (1990)	Position
US Top Country Albums (Billboard)	41
Chart (1991)	Position
US Top Country Albums (Billboard)	45

== Certifications ==
Region	Certification	Certified units/sales
United States (RIAA)	Gold	500,000^{^}
^{^} Shipments figures based on certification alone.
