= On Your Way Home =

Studio album by Patty Loveless
- Released: September 16, 2003
- Genre: Country
- Length: 42:36
- Label: Epic
- Producer: Emory Gordy, Jr.

Patty Loveless chronology
Bluegrass & White Snow (2002)	On Your Way Home (2003)	Dreamin' My Dreams (2005)

Singles from On Your Way Home
- 1. "Lovin' All Night" Released: June 14, 2003; 2. "On Your Way Home" Released: 2003; 3. "I Wanna Believe" Released: 2004

Professional ratings
Review scores
Source	Rating
About.com	5/5 stars
Allmusic	4.5/5 stars
Entertainment Weekly	A−
People	3.5/4 stars

On Your Way Home is the thirteenth studio album by American country music artist Patty Loveless. It was released in 2003 on Epic Records, the album produced only one Top 20 country single: a cover of Rodney Crowell's 1992 hit "Lovin' All Night" (#18). "Lovin' All Night" would go on to be Loveless' last top 20 hit, the album's second single "On Your Way Home" peaked at #29 marking Patty's last appearance in the country top 40. The third and final single "I Wanna Believe" was the last charting single of her career barely making it to #60 on the single chart.

Recorded in April and May 2003, the album was released in September. It first charted on the Billboard Top Country Albums chart on October 4 (peaking at #7), and remained on the charts for 33 weeks until May 20, 2004.

The CD also included a bonus DVD which had footage from Loveless' 2001 Austin City Limits appearance with performances of "Here I Am", from her When Fallen Angels Fly album; "Pretty Little Miss" and "You'll Never Leave Harlan Alive", both from her Mountain Soul album. It also has the video for "Lovin' All Night" along with a photo gallery of publicity photos and the credits.

== Track listing ==
No.	Title	Writer(s)	Length
1.	"Draggin' My Heart Around"	Paul Kennerley, Marty Stuart	3:26
2.	"Nothin' Like the Lonely"	Scott Parker, Craig Fuller, Caryl Mack Parker	3:29
3.	"I Wanna Believe"	Al Anderson, Gary Nicholson, Jessi Alexander	3:56
4.	"On Your Way Home"	Ronnie Samoset, Matraca Berg	3:39
5.	"I Don't Wanna Be That Strong"	Tim Mensy, Tony Haselden	3:37
6.	"Born-Again Fool"	Roger Brown	4:48
7.	"Looking for a Heartache Like You"	Jim Lauderdale, Buddy Miller, Julie Miller	3:11
8.	"Higher Than the Wall"	Mike Henderson, Chris Stapleton	3:22
9.	"Lovin' All Night"	Rodney Crowell	3:38
10.	"Last in a Long Lonesome Line"	Bob DiPiero, Anderson, Jeffrey Steele	3:42
11.	"The Grandpa That I Know"	Mensy, Shawn Camp	5:19

== Personnel ==
Adapted from liner notes.

- Tom Britt - electric guitar (tracks 4, 10)
- Mike Compton - mandolin (track 3)
- Jerry Douglas - lead dobro (track 11)
- Stuart Duncan - fiddle (tracks 1–3, 5, 6, 8, 9, 11)
- Steve Gibson - acoustic guitar (tracks 3, 5, 6, 8), baritone guitar (track 5), electric guitar (track 7)
- Emory Gordy Jr. - bass guitar (all tracks)
- Tim Hensley - mandolin (track 6), background vocals (tracks 3, 6)
- Rebecca Lynn Howard - background vocals (track 2)
- Jedd Hughes - acoustic guitar (track 11), electric guitar (tracks 1, 2, 5, 8, 9), background vocals (track 1)
- Carl Jackson - background vocals (track 11)
- Patty Loveless - lead vocals (all tracks)
- Liana Manis - background vocals (tracks 5, 10)
- Russ Pahl - 12-string guitar (track 3), additional dobro (track 11), banjo (track 2), electric guitar (track 9), lap steel guitar (track 1), steel guitar (tracks 3–5, 8, 10)
- Al Perkins - steel guitar (track 6)
- Carmella Ramsey - background vocals (tracks 3, 6–8)
- Deanie Richardson - fiddle (tracks 4, 7, 10), fiddle pads (track 11), mandolin (tracks 2, 11)
- Tammy Rogers - background vocals (track 11)
- John Wesley Ryles - background vocals (tracks 5, 10)
- Harry Stinson - drums (all tracks), background vocals (tracks 1, 2, 7–9)
- Kenny Vaughan - electric guitar (tracks 3, 6, 7)
- Biff Watson - acoustic guitar (tracks 1, 2, 4, 9–11)

== Chart performance ==
Chart (2003)	Peak position
U.S. Billboard Top Country Albums	7
U.S. Billboard 200	77
