= A Little Bit in Love =

Single by Patty Loveless

from the album If My Heart Had Windows
- B-side: "I Can't Get You Off My Mind"
- Released: June 4, 1988
- Recorded: 1987
- Genre: Country
- Length: 2:26
- Label: MCA Nashville
- Songwriter: Steve Earle
- Producers: Emory Gordy Jr., Tony Brown

Patty Loveless singles chronology
"If My Heart Had Windows" (1987)	"A Little Bit in Love" (1988)	"Blue Side of Town" (1988)

"A Little Bit in Love" is a song recorded by American country music artist Patty Loveless. It was released in June 1988 as the third single from her album If My Heart Had Windows.

== Background ==
"A Little Bit in Love" was originally recorded by its writer Steve Earle in 1985. His version did not chart.

The Patty Loveless version charted for 18 weeks on the Billboard Hot Country Singles and Tracks chart, reaching #2 during the week of September 10, 1988.

== Charts ==
=== Weekly charts ===
Chart (1988)	Peak position
US Hot Country Songs (Billboard)	2

=== Year-end charts ===
Chart (1988)	Position
US Hot Country Songs (Billboard)	17
