= Patty Loveless =

American country music singer (born 1957)

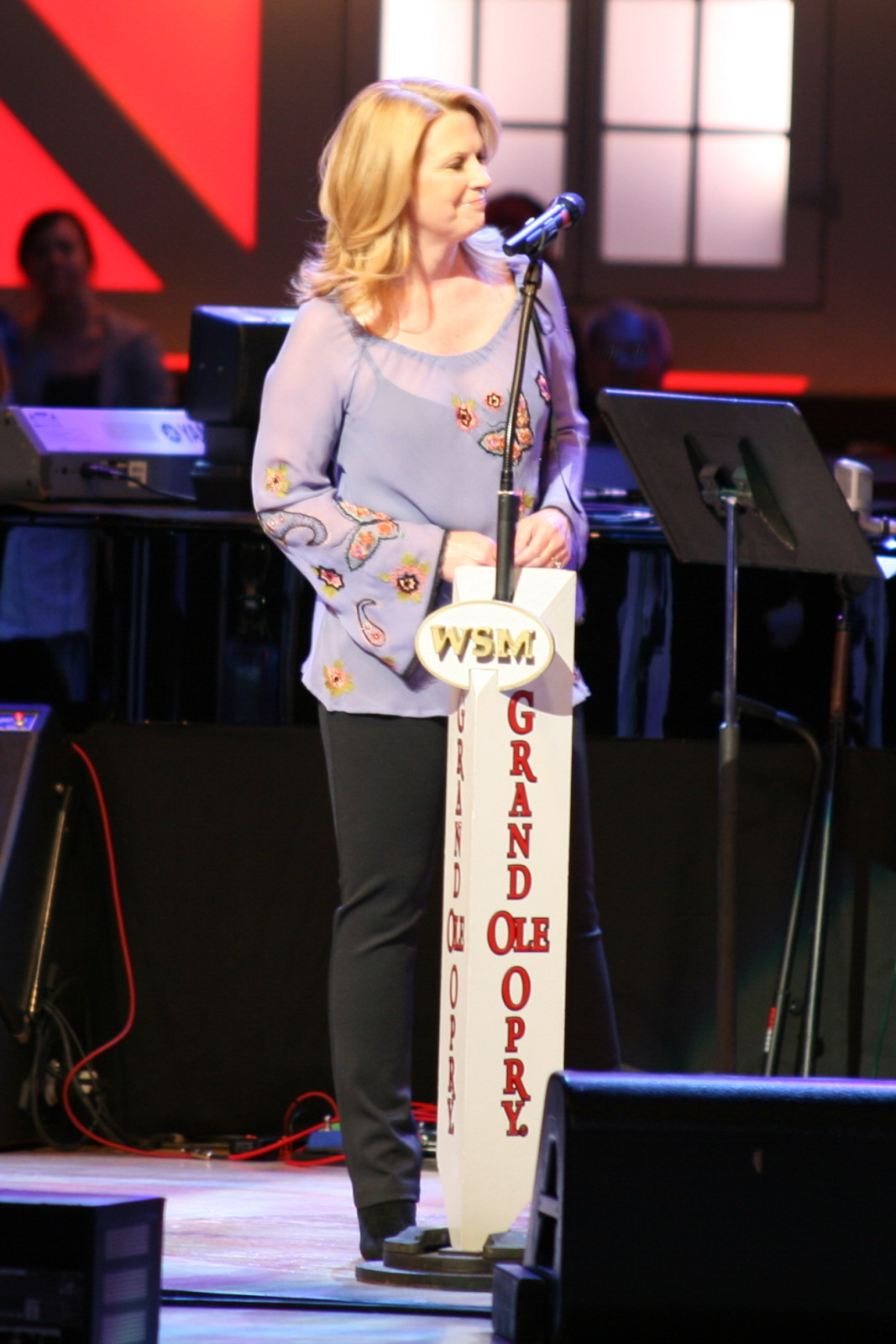
- Loveless performing at the Grand Ole Opry in 2007
- Born: Patricia Lee Ramey; January 4, 1957 (age 69); Pikeville, Kentucky, U.S.
- Occupation: Singer
- Years active: 1973–present
- Spouses: Terry Lovelace (m. 1976; div. 1986) Emory Gordy Jr. (m. 1989)
- Awards: Full list
- Musical career
- Origin: Nashville, Tennessee, U.S.
- Genres: Neotraditional country; honky-tonk; country rock; bluegrass
- Instrument: Vocals
- Works: Patty Loveless discography
- Labels: MCA Nashville; Epic Nashville; Saguaro Road
- Website: Official website

Patty Loveless (born Patricia Lee Ramey, January 4, 1957) is an American country music singer. She began performing in her teenaged years before signing her first recording contract with MCA Records' Nashville division in 1985. While her first few releases were unsuccessful, she broke through by decade's end with a cover of George Jones's "If My Heart Had Windows". Loveless issued five albums on MCA before moving to Epic Records in 1993, where she released nine more albums. Four of her albums—Honky Tonk Angel, Only What I Feel, When Fallen Angels Fly, and The Trouble with the Truth—are certified platinum in the United States. Loveless has charted 44 singles on the Billboard Hot Country Songs charts, including five which reached number one: "Timber, I'm Falling in Love", "Chains", "Blame It on Your Heart", "You Can Feel Bad", and "Lonely Too Long".

Loveless's music is defined by a mix of sounds, including neotraditional country, honky-tonk, country rock, and bluegrass music, with her singing voice garnering favorable comparisons to Loretta Lynn and Emmylou Harris. Recurring songwriters whose work she has recorded include Matraca Berg, Kostas, Jim Lauderdale, and Steve Earle. She has collaborated with Vince Gill, George Jones, and Dwight Yoakam, among others. Nearly all of her albums were produced by her husband, Emory Gordy Jr. Although she largely retired from performing in 2009, Loveless has sporadically contributed to other artists' works in subsequent years. She has won five awards from the Country Music Association, two from the Academy of Country Music, and two Grammy Awards.

Loveless was inducted into the Country Music Hall of Fame on October 22, 2023.

== Early life ==
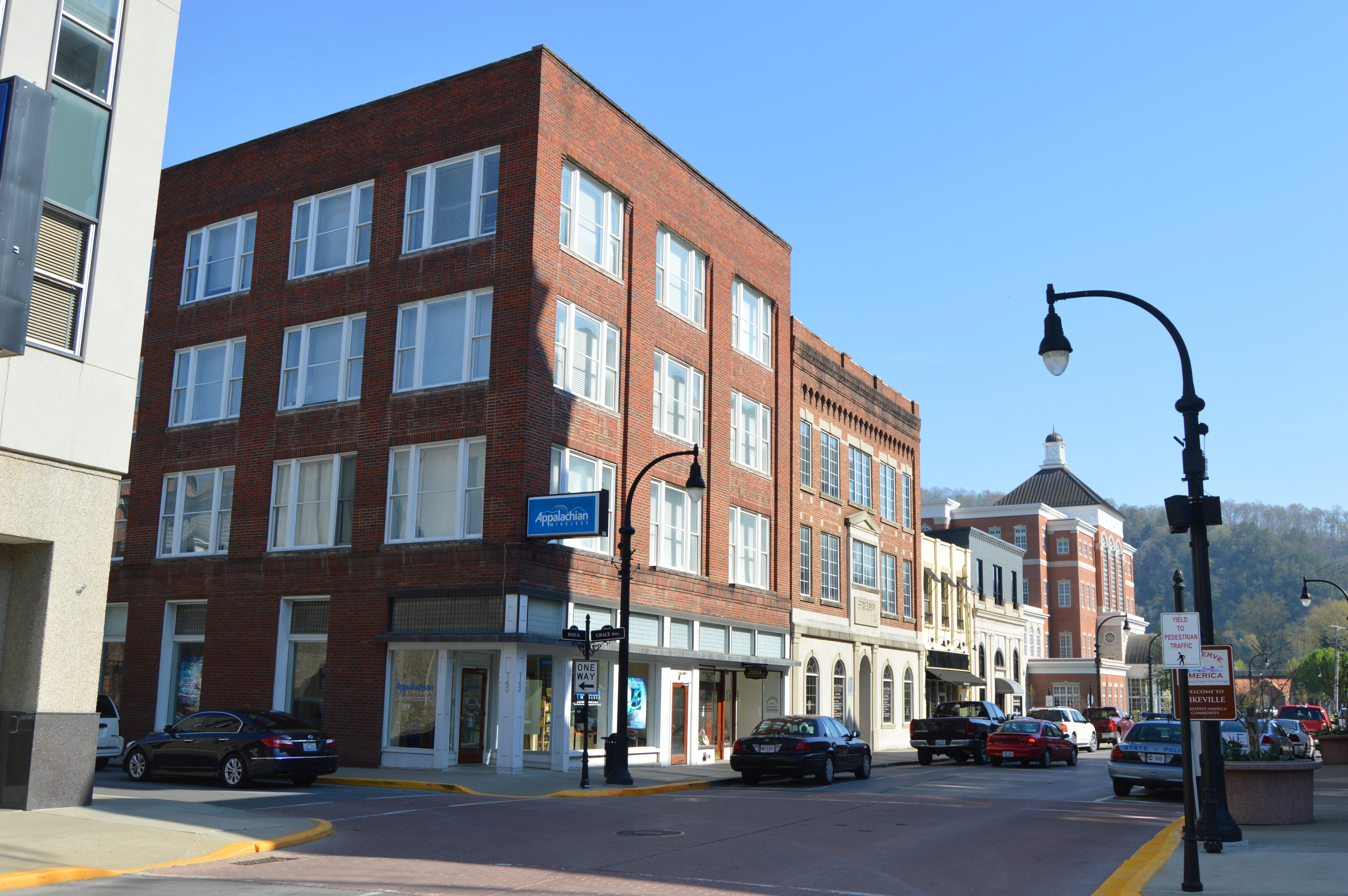
Patty Loveless was born in Pikeville, Kentucky.

Patty Loveless was born Patricia Lee Ramey on January 4, 1957, in Pikeville, Kentucky, to Naomi (née Bowling; 1921–2006) and John Ramey (1921–1979). She is the sixth of seven children. Through her patriline, Loveless is a distant cousin of country singers Loretta Lynn and Crystal Gayle. She was raised in nearby Elkhorn City, Kentucky, where her father worked in a coal mine. He contracted black lung disease as a result of the job, forcing the family to move to Louisville, Kentucky, to facilitate his medical treatments. John Ramey died of the disease in 1979.

By the time she was 11, she began playing guitar and writing songs with her brother Roger, which led to the two of them performing together at local events. The two were discovered at one such show by the Wilburn Brothers. The duo did not consider her mature enough for a musical career at the time and encouraged her to keep performing. After she graduated from Fairdale High School, she began touring with the Wilburn Brothers as a vocalist in their touring band. In 1976 she married the band's drummer, Terry Lovelace, the same year and moved with him to Charlotte, North Carolina. At this point, she altered the spelling of her name to Patty Loveless, a variant of her married name.

Loveless spent much of the late 1970s playing rock cover songs at various venues in the Midwestern United States. By the mid-1980s, she moved back to Nashville, Tennessee, to pursue a career as a country artist. At the time, Loveless said she was inspired by the rise of neotraditional country in the mid-1980s through such acts as Dwight Yoakam, The Judds, and Randy Travis. In Nashville, she sang demo recordings for other artists and signed a songwriting contract with Acuff-Rose Music in 1985. Loveless recorded five of her own songs on a demo tape, which her brother Roger sent to MCA Records' Nashville division. Tony Brown (a record producer who was also serving as that label's president of artists and repertoire) helped sign Loveless to the label in July 1985.

== Career ==
=== 1985–1990: Early years ===
Loveless began recording music for MCA with production assistance from both Brown and Emory Gordy Jr., a producer whom Roger had befriended. Prior to working with Loveless, Gordy was a member of Emmylou Harris's backing band, the Hot Band. MCA Nashville released Loveless's debut single in late 1985 titled "Lonely Days, Lonely Nights". This was followed by "Wicked Ways", "I Did", and "After All". All four singles peaked outside the top 40 on the American Billboard Hot Country Songs charts. Because of their failures, MCA executives initially did not want to release an album. However, Loveless noted that "I Did" was highly popular among fans and concertgoers despite its low chart showing and successfully convinced label executives to allow the release of a full album.

That album, the self-titled Patty Loveless, was released in 1986. Gordy and Brown produced the project and were among the contributing musicians, as were guitarists Reggie Young and Richard Bennett. Contributing songwriters included Guy Clark, Jo-El Sonnier, and Karen Staley. Loveless had written "I Did" at age 17 after undergoing a breakup, and it is the only single in her career that she wrote. She had originally recorded "After All" as a demo for songwriters Jimbeau Hinson and Harry Stinson, who had intended for the song to be recorded by Reba McEntire. When McEntire chose not to record the song, the two songwriters allowed Loveless to keep it. Loveless supported her debut album by touring with George Jones, which led to the two singing "Roll in My Sweet Baby's Arms" together in concerts. An uncredited review in Cashbox of "Lonely Days, Lonely Nights" called it "a boot-tapper that shows off her strong voice and rhythmic phrasing." The same magazine published a favorable review of "I Did", which stated that the song "really does seem to come from the heart" and had a "classic sound". During the same period, she also divorced first husband, Terry Lovelace.

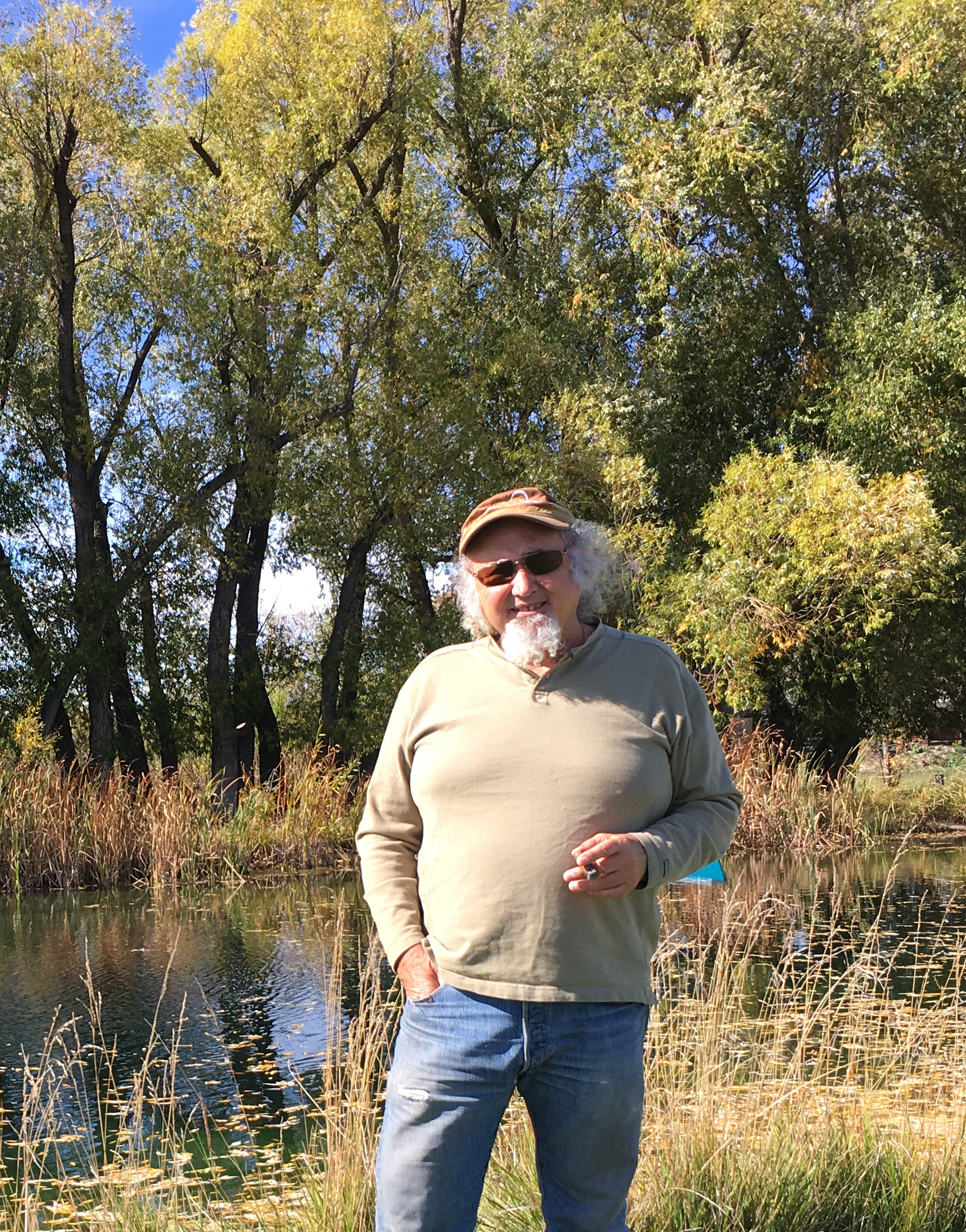
Loveless's first number-one single was "Timber, I'm Falling in Love", written by songwriter Kostas.

Loveless's second MCA album was 1988's If My Heart Had Windows. The lead single was the Curtis Wright composition "You Saved Me" (which fell outside the country top 40). It was followed by her first top-10 hit, a cover of George Jones's 1967 single "If My Heart Had Windows". The third and final single was a cover of Steve Earle's "A Little Bit in Love". By mid-1988, Loveless's rendition had peaked at number two on the Billboard country charts. A review written by Thom Jurek of AllMusic praised these two covers in particular, also stating that her "integrity, down-home sincerity, and utterly stunning voice have helped to create a streak of fine recordings and chart success". Jack Hurst of the Chicago Tribune was mixed toward the album, praising Loveless's voice, but criticizing the production as being more country pop in nature. Coinciding with the album's release, Loveless was inducted into the Grand Ole Opry in 1988. Throughout 1988, Loveless also gained exposure in the United Kingdom by performing at an annual country music festival held at Wembley Arena.

In late 1988, Loveless's third album was released called Honky Tonk Angel. Shortly after the album's release, she and Gordy married. The lead single was "Blue Side of Town", which was co-written by Hank DeVito (another member of Emmylou Harris's Hot Band). This song achieved a top-five peak, as did a cover of Lone Justice's "Don't Toss Us Away". After these came her first number-one single, "Timber, I'm Falling in Love". Brown discovered the song when seeking material for the album. It was written by Greek-American songwriter Kostas, who at the time was not considering a career in country. Due to the success of "Timber, I'm Falling in Love", Kostas went on to write more songs for Loveless and for other country artists. "The Lonely Side of Love" (another song written by Kostas) peaked in the country top ten by late 1989. In early 1990, the album's final single "Chains" became her second to top the country chart. MCA promoted the album through CMT, which included a prize drawing where fans could win a trip to see Loveless perform at Billy Bob's Texas, a nightclub in Fort Worth, Texas. In addition, the label gave away autographed posters and signed Loveless to an endorsement deal with Justin Boots. Honky Tonk Angel was later certified platinum by the Recording Industry Association of America (RIAA) for shipments of one million copies. Brian Mansfield described the project as "the album that established Loveless as a major presence". Wendy Dudley of the Calgary Herald praised Loveless's "robust vocals", comparing them favorably to those of Patsy Cline.

=== 1990–1991: Final years with MCA ===
In 1990 Loveless released her fourth studio album, On Down the Line. She charted within the top five with the album's title track, another composition by Kostas. Next came a cover of Lucinda Williams's "The Night's Too Long", which reached number 20. The disc also spawned "I'm That Kind of Girl" and "Blue Memories", respectively co-written by Matraca Berg and Karen Brooks. Both made their chart appearances in early 1991. On Down the Line achieved a gold certification honoring shipments of 500,000 copies. Alex Henderson wrote of the album on AllMusic, "Unpredictable and consistently inspired, On Down the Line remains one of Loveless's finest albums." Hurst wrote that "Loveless's world-class vocal power has seemed for three albums to be searching for material that could engage her soul, and she appears to have found it in this collection".

Loveless ended her tenure on MCA with Up Against My Heart in 1991. Its lead single was the top-five song, "Hurt Me Bad (In a Real Good Way)", co-written by (and featuring backing vocals from) Deborah Allen. Dolly Parton, Mac McAnally, and Vince Gill also sang on several album tracks. The closing track was a cover of Lyle Lovett's "God Will". Follow-up singles, "Jealous Bone" and "Can't Stop Myself from Loving You", were less successful on Billboard. Alanna Nash of Entertainment Weekly rated the album "A+", comparing the music favorably to Loretta Lynn and Emmylou Harris. The editors of Country Music: The Encyclopedia attributed the commercial failure of Up Against My Heart to the increased success of other women on the MCA label such as Wynonna Judd and Trisha Yearwood. In 1992, Loveless ended her contract with MCA and fired her brother Roger from his position as her manager. Her last MCA release was a Greatest Hits package in 1993. After its release, this compilation was certified gold.

=== 1992–1997: Surgery and move to Epic Records ===
Loveless signed with Epic Records in late 1992 following her departure from MCA. While between labels she was featured on Dwight Yoakam's 1992 single "Send a Message to My Heart" (from his 1990 album If There Was a Way). Before she could begin recording, she was diagnosed with an aneurysm on one of her vocal cords. This had developed from a vocal strain endured from multiple years of touring. Although the aneurysm was surgically removed in October 1992, she required a month of vocal rest and therapy before singing again. After recovery, she made her Epic Records debut with Only What I Feel (1993), an album cited by AllMusic and the Virgin Encyclopedia of Country Music as her breakthrough. The album again featured Gordy as both producer and bass guitarist. Vince Gill and Joe Diffie provided backing vocals, while musical contributions included keyboardist Barry Beckett, steel guitarist Paul Franklin, and strings by members of the Nashville String Machine. Her first single for Epic was "Blame It on Your Heart", co-written by Kostas and Harlan Howard. In mid-1993, this song became Loveless's third number-one single on Billboard. Also in 1993, she was one of many featured vocalists on George Jones's "I Don't Need Your Rockin' Chair", which won the Country Music Association's Vocal Event of the Year for everyone involved.

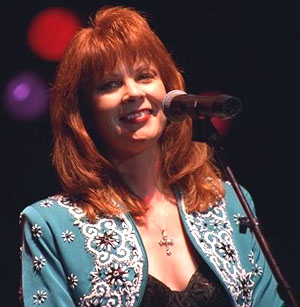
Loveless in the mid 90s.

Only What I Feel accounted for three more singles between then and 1994: "Nothin' but the Wheel", "You Will", and "How Can I Help You Say Goodbye". The latter songs both reached the Billboard country top ten. "You Will" was co-written by Pam Rose and Mary Ann Kennedy (then of the country duo Kennedy Rose), and was originally recorded by Anne Murray in 1991. Actor Burton Collins came up with the concept of "How Can I Help You Say Goodbye" after his grandmother's death in 1988, but did not finish the song until much later when he met co-writer Karen Taylor-Good. Alanna Nash of Entertainment Weekly thought that Loveless's vocals had become stronger after the surgery and that the songs had themes of "understanding between the sexes". Michael McCall of AllMusic also found Loveless's voice stronger than on her MCA work, highlighting her delivery on "Nothin' but the Wheel" in particular. At the 37th Grammy Awards in 1995, "How Can I Help You Say Goodbye" was nominated for Best Female Country Vocal Performance, her first nomination from that organization.

Her second Epic album was 1994's When Fallen Angels Fly. The lead single, "I Try to Think About Elvis", peaked at number three on the country charts the same year. Also spawned as singles were the top ten songs "Here I Am", "You Don't Even Know Who I Am", and "Halfway Down". When Fallen Angels Fly later won Album of the Year from the Country Music Association. The album had not originally been considered for nomination in this category, but the Country Music Association added it after disqualifying Alison Krauss's Now That I've Found You: A Collection. She won Top Female Vocalist from the Academy of Country Music in both 1995 and 1996. "You Don't Even Know Who I Am" was nominated as Song of the Year by the Academy of Country Music and the Grammy Award for Best Female Country Vocal Performance. When Fallen Angels Fly was certified platinum in 1996. Bob Cannon of Entertainment Weekly thought that Loveless displayed a wider emotional range on the album than other contemporary female country artists, contrasting her vocal delivery on "Halfway Down" and "You Don't Even Know Who I Am". Richard McVey wrote of "Here I Am" in Cashbox magazine that "She pours out emotions through her vocals like few can".

=== 1996–1999: Middle years with Epic ===
In 1996, Epic released her eighth studio album called The Trouble with the Truth. The album's lead single was the Matraca Berg co-write "You Can Feel Bad". It became Loveless's fourth number-one single on Billboard's country chart. The follow-up was "A Thousand Times a Day" (originally recorded by George Jones in 1993), which stopped at number 13 on the charts. It was succeeded by her fifth and final number-one single, "Lonely Too Long". After these came the top-10 hit "She Drew a Broken Heart" and then the top 20 title track. Loveless described the project as having a theme of "see[ing] things as they are, not how you wish they'd be." The Trouble with the Truth received Album of the Year nominations from both the Academy of Country Music and Country Music Association. The project accounted for two Grammy nominations – the album itself for Best Country Album in 1997, and the title track for Best Female Country Vocal Performance a year later. By 1998, the album was certified platinum. The project also contained a cover of Richard Thompson's "Tear Stained Letter". A review in Billboard criticized this cover for not fitting thematically with the album, but stated of the other tracks that she "manages to sound simultaneously contemporary and traditional". The same magazine published a review of "Lonely Too Long", stating that her voice "exudes a variety of emotion on this well-written tune". Writing for Country Standard Time, Jeffrey B. Remz praised "Loveless's overwhelming ability to tackle the emotional core of each and every song."

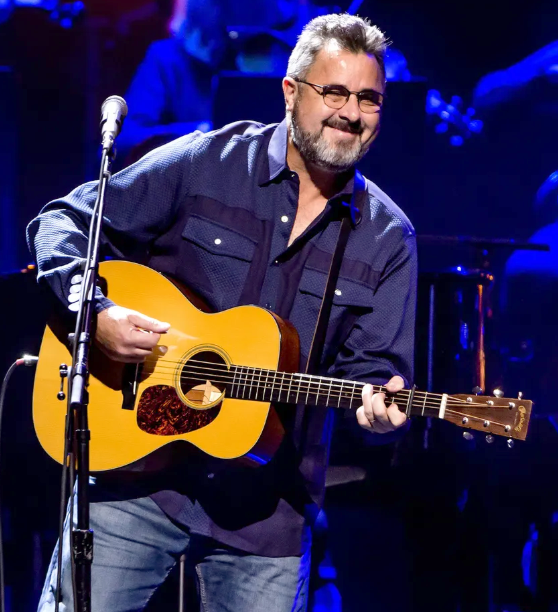
Loveless collaborated with Vince Gill on a number of occasions.

In late 1997, Loveless reached the top 20 of the country charts with the George Jones duet "You Don't Seem to Miss Me". This was the lead single to her ninth album, Long Stretch of Lonesome. "To Have You Back Again" and "High on Love" (another song co-written by Kostas) also charted in the top 20 from this album, while "Like Water into Wine" became her first solo single since 1987 to miss the country top 40. "You Don't Seem to Miss Me" won Vocal Event of the Year from the Country Music Association in 1998, and was nominated for Best Country Collaboration with Vocals at the 40th Annual Grammy Awards. Co-writers on the album included Kostas, Kim Richey, Jim Lauderdale, and Nitty Gritty Dirt Band member Jeff Hanna. Carole L. Phillips of The Cincinnati Post rated the album "A", noting influences of both bluegrass and rock music on "High on Love", while comparing her delivery to Loretta Lynn and Roy Orbison on other tracks. Remz praised her vocal delivery on "To Have You Back Again", "You Don't Seem to Miss Me", and the title track in particular. Long Stretch of Lonesome was certified gold in 1998. Also in 1998, she joined another multiple-artist collaboration. This was "Same Old Train", included on the 1998 tribute album A Tribute to Tradition. This song charted on Hot Country Songs that year and won Grammy Award for Best Country Collaboration with Vocals, thus giving Loveless her first Grammy.

Her next Epic release was a compilation titled Classics, issued in 1999. The album included nine singles from her previous Epic albums along with three new tracks. Two of these—"Can't Get Enough" and the Vince Gill duet "My Kind of Woman/My Kind of Man"— were issued as singles. Loveless and Gill had worked together on a number of occasions prior to this song; notably, she sang backing vocals on his singles "When I Call Your Name", "Pocket Full of Gold", and "Go Rest High on That Mountain". "My Kind of Woman/My Kind of Man" won both artists the Country Music Association award for Vocal Event of the Year. Remz praised the consistency of the previously released singles, but considered "Can't Get Enough" inferior by comparison. Classics was certified gold in 2002. Loveless took a brief recording hiatus at the end of the decade due to her contracting pneumonia and Gordy requiring emergency surgery for pancreatitis. One exception to this hiatus came in late 1999, when she provided backing vocals on Tim McGraw's number-one single "Please Remember Me".

=== 2000–2005: Transition to bluegrass and final years with Epic ===
Loveless returned in 2000 with the studio project Strong Heart. On recording the album, she said she wanted to find songs that appealed to young adults. Steve Earle contributed a harmonica part on the track "You're So Cool". It spawned two top-20 country singles with "That's the Kind of Mood I'm In" and "The Last Thing on My Mind". Despite these chart entries, the album was commercially unsuccessful, with Steve Huey of AllMusic attributing its failure to a more country pop sound than the preceding albums. Alanna Nash shared a similar opinion in a review for Entertainment Weekly, although she praised the track "My Heart Will Never Pass This Way Again" for the inclusion of fiddle music. Country Standard Time reviewer Eli Messinger was more mixed toward the project, considering it inferior to Long Stretch of Lonesome while noting the inclusion of Jimmy Hall and Travis Tritt on various tracks.

She released a pair of bluegrass albums between 2001 and 2002. The first of these was Mountain Soul, which consisted of original content and cover songs. Loveless said she had wanted to do an acoustic bluegrass album since 1992 when she met Ralph Stanley. Epic Records executives agreed to let her release the project after noticing positive fan reactions whenever she sang bluegrass songs in concert. Another factor in this decision was the contemporary success of bluegrass-influenced albums such as the soundtrack of O Brother, Where Art Thou? and the works of Nickel Creek. The album included guest vocals from Earl Scruggs and Ricky Skaggs, along with covers of songs originally recorded by Porter Wagoner, Dolly Parton, and Darrell Scott. She also covered Gordy's composition "Cheap Whiskey", previously a single for Martina McBride in 1992. "Out of Control Raging Fire" (a duet with Travis Tritt) was released as a single and music video late in 2001. Messinger gave a positive review of the album for Country Standard Time, calling it "the most emotion-drenched and uncompromisingly powerful album of her career." Mountain Soul received a Grammy nomination in the category of Best Bluegrass Album after release. The tracks "The Boys Are Back in Town" and "You'll Never Leave Harlan Alive" both received Song of the Year nominations at the 2002 International Bluegrass Music Awards. This project was followed in 2002 by the Christmas bluegrass album Bluegrass & White Snow: A Mountain Christmas. It consisted mostly of traditional Christmas covers such as "Silent Night" and "Away in a Manger". Jon Randall contributed to a rendition of "Joy to the World", and Rebecca Lynn Howard on "The Little Drummer Boy". In addition to these songs, Gordy wrote the title track and two other original compositions.

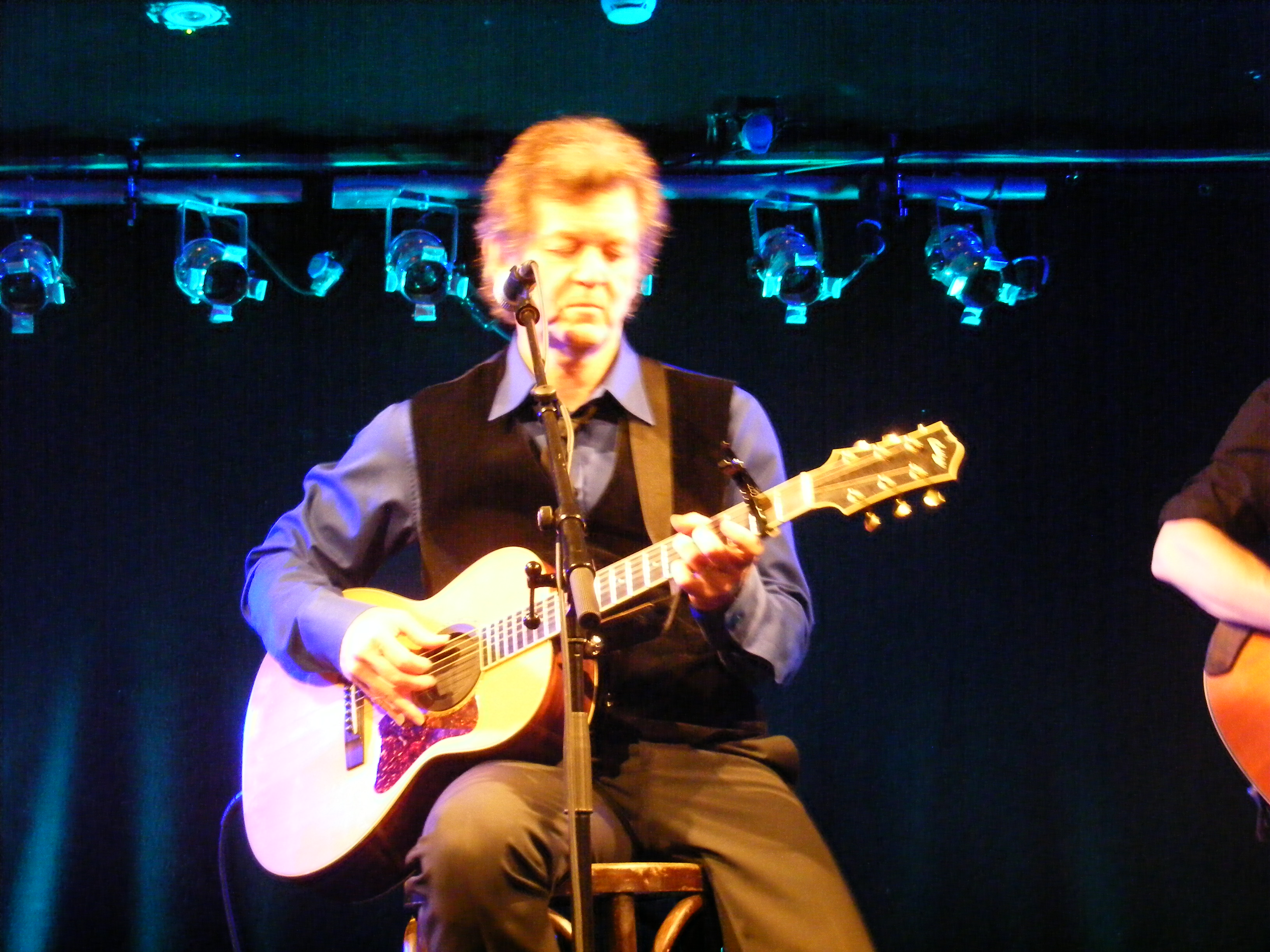
Loveless released a cover of Rodney Crowell's "Lovin' All Night" in 2003.

Loveless's next album was 2003's On Your Way Home. Loveless later said that she and Emory Gordy wanted to mix the "traditional" bluegrass feel of Mountain Soul with more contemporary instruments such as drums and electric guitar. The album's first single was a cover of Rodney Crowell's "Lovin' All Night". It became Loveless's last top-20 hit, while the title track and "I Wanna Believe" were her last chart entries altogether. Co-writers on the album included Marty Stuart, Buddy Miller, and Matraca Berg. Steven Wine of the Associated Press praised Loveless's "earthy twang", while considering the closing track "The Grandpa That I Know" the strongest lyrically. AllMusic writer Thom Jurek also praised "The Grandpa That I Know" and Loveless's overall vocal tone, as well as the inclusion of Dobro and fiddle in the production. The album led to Loveless receiving Female Vocalist of the Year nominations from both the Academy of Country Music and Country Music Association, while the title track was nominated for a Grammy Award for Best Female Country Vocal Performance. In 2004, Loveless contributed backing vocals to Alan Jackson's single "Monday Morning Church". The two also performed the song together at that year's Country Music Association awards ceremony.

The 2005 release Dreamin' My Dreams was Loveless's last release for Epic before the label closed its Nashville branch. The project was co-produced by Gordy and Justin Niebank. Contributing musicians included Lee Roy Parnell, Jon Randall, and Emmylou Harris. The album included four cover songs: Waylon Jennings's "Dreaming My Dreams with You", Richard Thompson's "Keep Your Distance", Steve Earle's "My Old Friend the Blues", and a duet with Dwight Yoakam on a cover of Delaney Bramlett's "Never Ending Song of Love". The cover of "Keep Your Distance" was the only single from the album. Brian Wahlert of Country Standard Time said of this album that Loveless and Gordy "have a knack for finding songs that express the joy and pain of everyday life in a way that anyone can relate to." He praised Loveless's vocal delivery on the song "On the Verge of Tears" in particular. Jack Bernhardt of The News and Observer considered the album her strongest release, noting the "storytelling intrigue" of the songs, while comparing Loveless's vocals favorably to those of Patsy Cline. The same year as this album, Vince Gill featured her as a duet partner on the track "Out of My Mind" from his compilation These Days.

=== 2008–present: Continued bluegrass work and retirement ===
In 2006, Loveless appeared on rock singer Bob Seger's Face the Promise as a duet partner on the track "The Answer's in the Question". David N. Cole, Seger's audio engineer, had recommended Loveless as a duet partner because he thought the song should be recorded as a duet. Seger was initially unsure if Loveless would approve, but the two agreed after realizing they were fans of each other's music. She then took a hiatus from recording, due in part to Epic closing its Nashville branch. In addition, her mother and mother-in-law had both died and her brother Roger had suffered a stroke. Her next album release was Sleepless Nights on Saguaro Road Records in 2008. According to an interview with CMT, Loveless chose to do a covers album dedicated to both Roger and to her sister Dottie (who died in 1996). Gordy produced and played bass on the album, with other contributors including pianist Hargus "Pig" Robbins, guitarist Al Perkins, and drummer Harry Stinson. The album featured covers of songs first cut by The Everly Brothers, George Jones, Porter Wagoner, and Webb Pierce. The lead single was a cover of Jones's "Why Baby Why". Jonathan Keefe of Slant Magazine called Loveless's vocals "interpretive" while also noting the "deliberate thematic heft" of the songs chosen. Jurek wrote of this album, "Loveless treats these songs without even a trace of nostalgia, but as the living embodiment of stories that not only transfer emotion, but reveal the hidden truths of love, life, sadness, grief, and wisdom gained by experience." In addition to this album, she sang duet vocals on the track "House of Cash" from George Strait's 2008 album Troubadour. At the 51st Annual Grammy Awards, Sleepless Nights was nominated for Best Country Album, while "House of Cash" was nominated for Best Country Collaboration with Vocals.

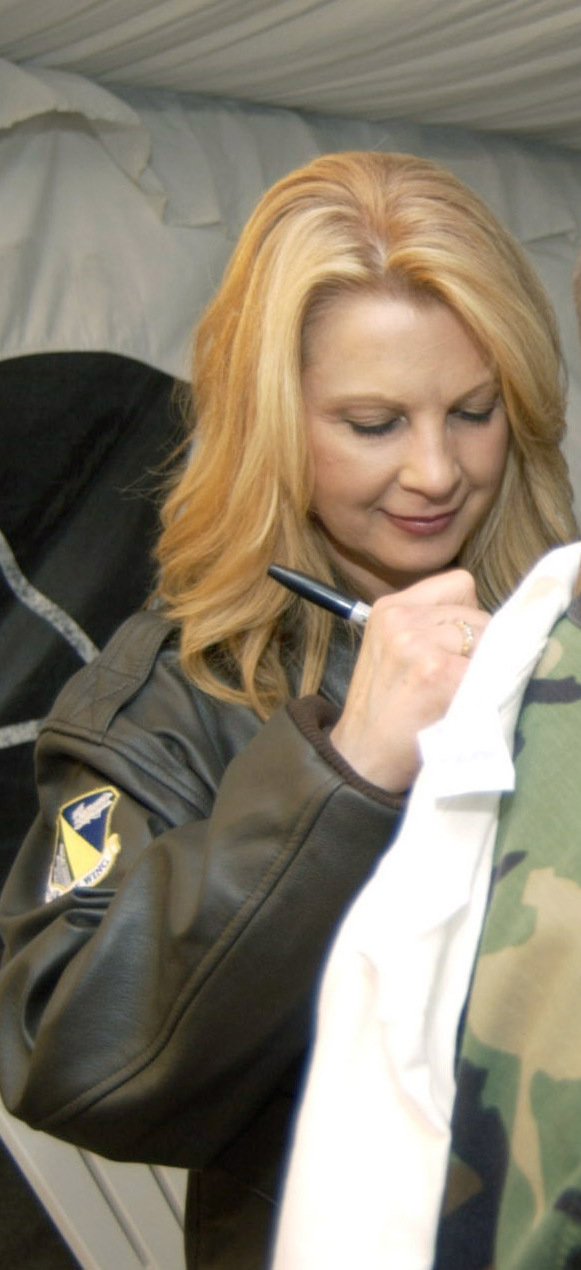
Loveless in 2004.

A year later, Loveless released her last studio album to date called Mountain Soul II. This was a follow-up to the original Mountain Soul project. Like its predecessor, it featured influences of acoustic and bluegrass music. Vince Gill, Del McCoury, and Emmylou Harris were among the contributing vocalists, the latter doing so on a cover of her own "Diamond in My Crown". Loveless also included a number of traditional Christian songs such as "Children of Abraham", which she sang a cappella. Loveless chose to include Christian material on the project as she had previously sung "Amazing Grace" with Ralph Stanley and Emmylou Harris while on tour with them. The album's lead single was a cover of Harlan Howard's "Busted". Keefe praised individual tracks such as this and the rendition of "I'm Working on a Building", but otherwise thought the album lacked the "focus" of its predecessor.

Although she largely retired from performing in 2009, Loveless has sporadically contributed to other artists' albums. She provided vocals to the track "Dear Diamond" on Miranda Lambert's 2010 album Four the Record. The same year, she joined with Danica Patrick, Caitlyn Jenner, and Michael Strahan in a program started by NASCAR titled Drive, which was done to raise awareness of chronic obstructive pulmonary disease. Loveless chose to join the program as her sister Dottie had died of the disease. She also appeared on albums by Angaleena Presley, Elizabeth Cook, Trisha Yearwood, and Carly Pearce.

In October 2022, Loveless was one of several performers at Kentucky Rising, a benefit concert held at Rupp Arena to raise funds for victims of flooding in Kentucky. Other performers at the venue included Chris Stapleton, Dwight Yoakam, Ricky Skaggs, and Tyler Childers. A month later, Loveless and Stapleton performed "You'll Never Leave Harlan Alive" together at the 56th Annual Country Music Association Awards.

== Musical style ==
The editors of Country Music: The Encyclopedia describe Loveless as having a "straight-from-the-heart, strong yet vulnerable vocal style", which they compared favorably to Loretta Lynn and Kitty Wells. The same entry noted that Loveless had commercial success with both upbeat songs and ballads, and stated that she "may not be one of the more flashy personalities around; nevertheless, the songs she chooses to sing and the way she chooses to sing them are some of the best of what modern 'traditional' country music is all about." Steve Huey of Allmusic wrote that she "rose to stardom thanks to her blend of honky-tonk and country rock, not to mention a plaintive, emotional ballad style...but most critics agreed that she truly came into her own as an artist when she moved to Epic in the early '90s." According to The Virgin Encyclopedia of Country Music, she attributed her vocal tone to her upbringing in areas of Kentucky known for bluegrass music.

In a review of Up Against My Heart, Alanna Nash described Loveless as having a "wild-and-wounded voice". She also wrote that "[l]ike neo-traditionalist Emmylou Harris, she isn't afraid of a sassy country rock beat or progressive lyrics that paint her as a woman who knows what she wants from love". Nash also noted that Loveless had yet to win any industry awards at the time of the album's release, stating that "her lack of both flamboyance and any desire to play Nashville politics" may have been a factor. Carole L. Phillips of The Cincinnati Post stated that Loveless "fus[es] the driving emotional intensity of rock with a throaty tenor". Geoffrey Himes of The Washington Post noted a recurring theme of "loss" and "heartache" in the lyrics of Loveless's songs. An uncredited article in The Courier-News of Bridgewater, New Jersey, stated that Loveless was "[b]lessed with a natural honky-tonk moan and heart-on-sleeve vocal honesty". The same article also described "The Lonely Side of Love", "Hurt Me Bad (In a Real Good Way)", and "Can't Stop Myself from Loving You" as more traditional in style than "rock-oriented" material like "Jealous Bone" or "Chains".

Nash described Gordy's production style as "lean but muscular". Loveless told CMA Close Up in 1996 that production sessions usually began with Gordy recording just her vocals and an acoustic guitar track to determine her vocal tone for each track before adding in other instruments. Remz stated in a review of Long Stretch of Lonesome that Gordy "knows just what to do with his wife's voice—let it rip, but he doesn't overmilk it either." Loveless told The Los Angeles Times in 1995 that she looks for songs with "realism" in the lyrics. She also stated that she did not like recording songs about relationships if they cast men in a negative light; she said she initially rejected "You Don't Even Know Who I Am" for this reason until she realized the song's second verse showed the failing relationship from the male's perspective, as well. As Loveless almost never wrote songs, she often enlisted Gordy's help in song selection and arrangement.

== Legacy ==
Because of her prolificacy in the 1990s, Loveless has been cited by several publications as having an influence on the subsequent generations of country music. In 2017, Taste of Country ranked her the 29th "most powerful woman" in country music, noting the critical success of the Mountain Soul albums. In the same article, Lauren Lucas stated that The Trouble with the Truth was a "huge influence" on her. Carly Pearce has also cited Loveless as a career influence. The two collaborated on the song "Dear Miss Loretta" from Pearce's 2021 album 29: Written in Stone.

Sara Evans, when discussing her plans to record a follow-up to her 2020 album Copy That, stated that she wanted said follow-up to have a more traditional country sound. In doing so, she also cited Loveless as one of her favorite artists, and said she wanted her upcoming album to sound like Loveless. Kevin John Coyne of Country Universe had previously compared Evans's voice to that of Loveless in a review of Evans's 1998 single "No Place That Far".

In 2023, Rolling Stone ranked Loveless at number 177 on its list of the 200 Greatest Singers of All Time. In April 2023, the Country Music Association announced that Loveless, fellow singer Tanya Tucker, and songwriter Bob McDill were the three people chosen for induction into the Country Music Hall of Fame for the calendar year 2023. She was formally inducted by her friend Vince Gill at a medallion ceremony on November 22, 2023.

== Personal life ==
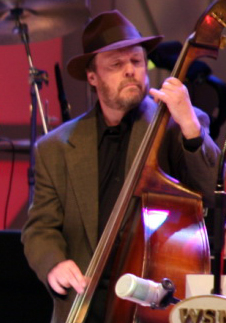
Loveless has been married to Emory Gordy Jr. since 1989.

Loveless's first marriage was to Terry Lovelace, drummer for the Wilburn Brothers, in 1976. After marrying him, she altered the spelling of her surname to Loveless. According to the Virgin Encyclopedia of Country Music, this change came about because she thought it would help to keep her from being mistaken for pornographic actress Linda Lovelace. Loveless previously confirmed as such in a 1990 interview with the Richmond Times-Dispatch. She divorced Terry Lovelace in 1986. Her second marriage was to Emory Gordy Jr. in February 1989. Gordy has served as bassist and producer on nearly all of Loveless's albums. Gordy had previously played bass in Emmylou Harris's touring band the Hot Band, and has also produced albums by the Bellamy Brothers, Earl Thomas Conley, and Alabama, among others. Loveless told The Los Angeles Times in 1995 that their relationship inspired the title track of When Fallen Angels Fly, as both of them had been in prior relationships and were uncertain if they would successfully develop another until they met each other. Loveless's brother Roger, who played several key roles in her early career, died at age 72 in June 2022.

== Discography ==
Studio albums

- Patty Loveless (1987)
- If My Heart Had Windows (1988)
- Honky Tonk Angel (1988)
- On Down the Line (1990)
- Up Against My Heart (1991)
- Only What I Feel (1993)
- When Fallen Angels Fly (1994)
- The Trouble with the Truth (1996)
- Long Stretch of Lonesome (1997)
- Strong Heart (2000)
- Mountain Soul (2001)
- Bluegrass & White Snow: A Mountain Christmas (2002)
- On Your Way Home (2003)
- Dreamin' My Dreams (2005)
- Sleepless Nights (2008)
- Mountain Soul II (2009)

== Awards and nominations ==
Patty Loveless has won five Country Music Association awards, two Academy of Country Music awards, and two Grammy Awards.
