= Honky Tonk Angel (Patty Loveless album) =

Studio album by Patty Loveless
- Released: October 1, 1988
- Recorded: 1988
- Studios: Soundstage, Nashville, TN
- Genres: Neotraditional country; honky-tonk
- Length: 32:08
- Label: MCA
- Producer: Tony Brown

Patty Loveless chronology
If My Heart Had Windows (1988)	Honky Tonk Angel (1988)	On Down the Line (1990)

Singles from Honky Tonk Angel
- 1. "Blue Side of Town" Released: October 1988; 2. "Don't Toss Us Away" Released: February 1989; 3. "Timber, I'm Falling in Love" Released: May 1989; 4. "The Lonely Side of Love" Released: September 1989; 5. "Chains" Released: December 1989

Professional ratings
Review scores
Source	Rating
AllMusic	3/5 stars

Honky Tonk Angel is the third studio album by American country music artist Patty Loveless. With five tracks from the album charting in the Billboard Top Ten Country Singles, including two at No. 1, it served as a breakthrough album for Loveless. The album itself was Loveless' highest charting at No. 7 on the Country Albums category. The two No. 1 singles were "Chains" and "Timber, I'm Falling in Love". Loveless also did a cover of the Lone Justice song, "Don't Toss Us Away", which featured Rodney Crowell on backing vocals. The song charted at No. 5. Famed songwriter Kostas had a major role by writing three of the album's tunes, including "Timber, I'm Falling in Love" and "The Lonely Side of Love", which peaked at No. 6.

== Musical style and composition ==
Honky Tonk Angel has been described as a neotraditional country and honky-tonk album.

== Track listing ==
No.	Title	Writer(s)	Length
1.	"Blue Side of Town"	Hank DeVito, Paul Kennerley	3:20
2.	"I Won't Gamble with Your Love"	Gary Scruggs, Kevin Welch	3:12
3.	"Go On"	Patty Loveless, Roger Murrah	2:33
4.	"If You Think"	Kostas	4:09
5.	"Chains"	Hal Bynum, Bud Reneau	2:27
6.	"Don't Toss Us Away"	Bryan MacLean	4:11
7.	"The Lonely Side of Love"	Kostas	3:02
8.	"I'll Never Grow Tired of You"	Carter Stanley	3:02
9.	"Timber, I'm Falling in Love"	Kostas	2:30
10.	"I'm on Your Side"	Jimbeau Hinson, Kim Tribble	3:19

== Personnel ==
- Drums, percussion: Eddie Bayers
- Bass guitar: Leland Sklar
- Keyboards: Matt Rollings
- Acoustic guitar: Mac McAnally
- Electric guitar: Albert Lee
- Mandolin: Albert Lee, Mark O'Connor
- Steel guitar: Paul Franklin
- Dobro: Paul Franklin
- Fiddle: Mark O'Connor
- Lead vocals: Patty Loveless
- Background vocals: Rodney Crowell, Vince Gill, Patty Loveless, Claire Lynch, Harry Stinson
- Produced By Tony Brown
- Pre-Production By Don Lanier
- Mixing By Bob Bullock & John Guess
- Engineered By Chuck Ainlay, Bob Bullock & Marty Williams

== Charts ==
=== Weekly charts ===
Chart (1988–89)	Peak position
Canadian Country Albums (RPM)	9
US Top Country Albums (Billboard)	7

=== Year-end charts ===
Chart (1989)	Position
US Top Country Albums (Billboard)	11
Chart (1990)	Position
US Top Country Albums (Billboard)	32

== Certifications ==
Region	Certification	Certified units/sales
Canada (Music Canada)	Gold	50,000^{^}
United States (RIAA)	Platinum	1,000,000^{^}
^{^} Shipments figures based on certification alone.
