= If My Heart Had Windows (Patty Loveless album) =

Studio album by Patty Loveless
- Released: January 25, 1988
- Recorded: 1987
- Studio: Sound Stage Studios, Masterfonics Studios Nashville, TN
- Genre: Neotraditional country
- Length: 32:36
- Label: MCA
- Producer: Emory Gordy, Jr. Tony Brown

Patty Loveless chronology
Patty Loveless (1987)	If My Heart Had Windows (1988)	Honky Tonk Angel (1988)

Singles from If My Heart Had Windows
- 1. "You Saved Me" Released: November 1987; 2. "If My Heart Had Windows" Released: February 1988; 3. "A Little Bit in Love" Released: June 1988

Professional ratings
Review scores
Source	Rating
Allmusic	link
Chicago Tribune	(mixed)

If My Heart Had Windows is the second studio album by American country music artist Patty Loveless, and was released in 1988. The title track — a cover of a George Jones song from 1967 — became Loveless' first top ten hit, peaking on the Billboard Country Music charts at number 10. It was then followed by her biggest chart position (number 2 on September 10, 1988) at the time with "A Little Bit In Love," a song written by country artist Steve Earle. It also features a recording of the song "Baby's Gone Blues", which would be recorded by Shelby Lynne for her 1990 album Tough All Over and by Reba McEntire for her 1992 album It's Your Call.

The album peaked at number 33 on April 2, 1988.

This album was released the same year (1988) that Loveless became a Member of the Grand Ole Opry.

== Musical style and composition ==
If My Heart Had Windows has been described as a neotraditional country album with elements of honky-tonk and rockabilly.

== Track listing ==
No.	Title	Writer(s)	Length
1.	"So Good to Be in Love"	Karen Staley	2:26
2.	"Working Man's Hands"	Johnny Pierce, Joanne Christy, Paul Marshall	2:50
3.	"You Saved Me"	Curtis Wright	3:22
4.	"If My Heart Had Windows"	Dallas Frazier	3:02
5.	"A Little Bit in Love"	Steve Earle	2:26
6.	"I Can't Get You Off of My Mind"	Hank Williams	2:33
7.	"Baby's Gone Blues"	Pat Bunch, Pam Rose, Mary Ann Kennedy	4:13
8.	"A Little on the Lonely Side"	Roger Murrah, Kitty Murrah	3:31
9.	"Fly Away"	John Hall, Johanna Hall	3:56
10.	"Once in a Lifetime"	Eric Kaz, Marsha Zwilling	4:17

== Personnel ==
- Patty Loveless - lead vocals
- Anthony Crawford, Vince Gill, Mary Ann Kennedy, Patty Loveless, Claire Lynch, Mac McAnally, Donna MacElroy, Michael Mishaw, Joann Neal, Pam Rose, Karen Staley - background vocals
- Reggie Young, Billy Joe Walker, Jr. - guitars
- Paul Franklin - dobro & steel guitar
- John Barlow Jarvis, Matt Rollings - piano
- Mike Lawler - keyboards, synthesizers, synthetic percussion
- Emory Gordy Jr. - bass guitar
- Glen Duncan - fiddle
- Eddie Bayers - drums

== Production ==
- Produced by Tony Brown & Emory Gordy Jr.
- Recording Engineers: Steve Tillisch & Ron Treat; assisted by Mark J. Coddington, Tim Kish, Russ Martin & Keith Odle
- Overdubs Recorded by Ron Treat
- Mixed by Steve Tillisch
- Digital Editing: Milan Bogdan
- Mastered by Glenn Meadows

== Chart performance ==
Chart (1988)	Peak position
U.S. Billboard Top Country Albums	33

== Singles ==
- Loveless stated that she dedicated "You Saved Me" to her producer at the time, and later husband, Emory Gordy, Jr. The song charted for 7 weeks on the Billboard Hot Country Singles and Tracks chart, reaching number 43 during the week of 12 December 1987.
