= Mountain Soul =

Studio album by Patty Loveless
- Released: June 26, 2001
- Studios: Hound's Ear Studio (Franklin, Tennessee); The Cove and Woodland Sound Studios (Nashville, Tennessee)
- Genres: Bluegrass; Appalachian
- Length: 46:23
- Label: Epic
- Producer: Emory Gordy, Jr.

Patty Loveless chronology
Strong Heart (2000)	Mountain Soul (2001)	Bluegrass & White Snow (2002)

Singles from Mountain Soul
- 1. "The Boys Are Back in Town" Released: November 2001; 2. "Out of Control Raging Fire" Released: January 2002

Music video
- "The Boys Are Back in Town" on YouTube

Music video
- "Out Of Control Raging Fire " on YouTube

Professional ratings
Review scores
Source	Rating
About.com	(favorable)
Allmusic	4/5 stars
Entertainment Weekly	A
Los Angeles Times	3/4 stars
PopMatters	9/10 stars
Rolling Stone	3.5/5 stars
Spin	(9/10)

Mountain Soul is the eleventh album of original recordings by Patty Loveless. The album was recorded between January and March 2001 and was released on June 26 in the United States. It first charted on the Billboard Top Country Albums chart on July 14 (peaking on July 28 at #19), and remaining on the charts for 87 weeks until March 8, 2003. Other country superstars also have done "You'll Never Leave Harlan Alive" such as Kathy Mattea and Brad Paisley. A follow-up album, Mountain Soul II was released in September 2009.

The album also charted on the main Top Billboard 200 chart, Top Bluegrass Album chart and the Top Internet Albums chart.

Rhapsody ranked the album #9 on its "Country’s Best Albums of the Decade" list.

Country Universe, ranked the album #10.

Engine 145 country music blog list it #6 on the "Top Country Albums of the Decade" list.

== Track listing ==
1. "The Boys Are Back in Town" (Don Humphries, Pat Enright, Stuart Duncan) – 2:34
2. "The Richest Fool Alive" (Kostas, Bobby Boyd, Don Mealer) – 3:22
3. "Daniel Prayed" (Ralph Stanley) – 2:45
4. "Someone I Used to Know" (Jack Clement) – 2:17
  - duet with Jon Randall
5. "Out of Control Raging Fire" (Kostas, Melba Montgomery) – 3:33
  - duet with Travis Tritt
6. "Rise Up Lazarus" (Emory Gordy Jr., Patty Loveless) – 2:21
7. "Cheap Whiskey" (Jim Rushing, Gordy Jr.) – 3:42
8. "Pretty Little Miss" (Gordy Jr., Loveless) – 2:41
9. "I Know You're Married (But I Love You Still)" (Don Reno, Mack Magaha) – 2:54
  - duet with Travis Tritt
10. "Sorrowful Angels" (Leslie Satcher, Tommy Conners) – 3:58
11. "Soul of Constant Sorrow" (Gordy Jr., Loveless) – 3:04
12. "You'll Never Leave Harlan Alive" (Darrell Scott) – 6:06
13. "Two Coats" (arr. Gordy Jr., Loveless) – 3:18
14. "Sounds of Loneliness" (Loveless) – 3:48

== Personnel ==
Musicians

- Patty Loveless – vocals
- Emory Gordy Jr. – guitar (1-3, 7, 8, 11), bass (4-6, 9, 10), slack key guitar (13, 14)
- Jon Randall – guitar (4, 6), vocals (4), backing vocals (6), mandolin (10)
- Travis Tritt – guitar (6), vocals (6, 9), backing vocals (8), lead guitar (9), rhythm guitar (9)
- Biff Watson – guitar (10, 13)
- Jeff White – guitar (12, 14), backing vocals (12, 14)
- Tom Britt – slide guitar (13)
- Rob Ickes – dobro (1, 3, 5, 7-11)
- Gene Wooten – dobro (2, 4, 6, 12)
- Darrell Scott – additional dobro (12), banjo (12)
- Alan O'Bryant – banjo (1, 7)
- Butch Lee – banjo (2), bass (8), tremolo mandolin (12)
- Earl Scruggs – banjo (8)
- Tim Hensley – mandolin (1, 2, 4-9, 12), backing vocals (1, 2, 4, 5, 7-10)
- Stuart Duncan – additional mandolin (1), fiddle (1, 5, 7-10, 13), backing vocals (13)
- Ricky Skaggs – mandolin (3, 11), cross tuned mandolin (3), backing vocals (3, 11)
- Steve Gibson – mandola (10)
- Clarence "Tater" Tate – bass (1-3, 7, 11), fiddle (4), bass vocals (6)
- Deanie Richardson – fiddle (1-9, 11, 12, 14), mandolin (14), drone fiddle (14)
- Carmella Ramsey – backing vocals (1-3, 6, 7, 11, 12, 14), drone fiddle (14)
- Rebecca Lynn Howard – backing vocals (10)

Production

- Emory Gordy Jr. – producer
- Justin Niebank – mixing, recording (1-12)
- Dennis Ritchie – recording (13, 14)
- Lilly Niebank – assistant engineer (1-12)
- Walker Niebank – assistant engineer (1-12)
- Amy Hughes Frigo – recording assistant (13)
- Glenn Meadows – mastering at Masterfonics (Nashville, Tennessee)
- Lauren Koch – production coordinator
- Tonya Derry – A&R coordinator
- Kay Smith – A&R coordinator
- Bill Johnson – art direction
- Beth Kindig – art direction
- D. Gorton – photography
- Claudia Fowler – stylist
- Debra Wingo – hair, make-up
- Mike Robertson – management

== Charts ==
=== Weekly charts ===
Chart (2001)	Peak position
US Billboard 200	159
US Top Bluegrass Albums (Billboard)	5
US Top Country Albums (Billboard)	19

=== Year-end charts ===
Chart (2001)	Position
US Top Country Albums (Billboard)	75
Chart (2002)	Position
US Top Country Albums (Billboard)	67
