= Blue Side of Town =

Single by Patty Loveless

from the album Honky Tonk Angel
- B-side: "If You Think"
- Released: October 8, 1988
- Recorded: 1988
- Genre: Country
- Length: 3:20
- Label: MCA Nashville
- Songwriter(s): Hank DeVito & Paul Kennerley
- Producer(s): Tony Brown

Patty Loveless singles chronology
"A Little Bit in Love" (1988)	"Blue Side of Town" (1988)	"Don't Toss Us Away" (1989)

"Blue Side of Town" is a song written by Paul Kennerley and Hank DeVito, and recorded by American country music artist Patty Loveless. It was released in October 1988 as the first single from her album Honky Tonk Angel.

Loveless purchased the recording rights to this song in 1985, a few years before she recorded it but it was not included on her self-titled album, Patty Loveless.

The song charted for 22 weeks on the Billboard Hot Country Singles and Tracks chart, reaching #4 during the week of January 14, 1989.

== Charts ==
Chart (1988–1989)	Peak position
Canada Country Tracks (RPM)	7
US Hot Country Songs (Billboard)	4

== Covers ==
- Canadian country music singer Lori Yates recorded the song for her 1989 album Can't Stop the Girl.
- Rosie Flores recorded the song for her 1987 self-titled album Rosie Flores.
