= Patty Loveless (album) =

Studio album by Patty Loveless
- Released: January 1987
- Recorded: 1985–1986
- Studios: Sound Stage, Nashville, TN
- Genre: Country
- Length: 31:24
- Label: MCA
- Producers: Emory Gordy, Jr., Tony Brown

Patty Loveless chronology
Patty Loveless (1987)	If My Heart Had Windows (1988)

Singles from Patty Loveless
- 1. "Lonely Days, Lonely Nights" Released: December 1985; 2. "Wicked Ways" Released: November 1986; 3. "I Did" Released: March 1987; 4. "After All" Released: June 1987

Patty Loveless is the debut album from country music artist Patty Loveless. It was released in January 1987. Among its tracks were Billboard Top Country Singles minor hits, "Lonely Days, Lonely Nights," "I Did," "After All," and "Wicked Ways." The album peaked at No. 35 on the Top Country Albums charts in 1987.

== Content ==
"Lonely Days, Lonely Nights" was the first single from the album. An uncredited review in Cashbox "a boot-tapper that shows off her strong voice and rhythmic phrasing."

According to Loveless, MCA executives had originally held off on releasing the album due to the poor performance of its singles. However, she told these executives that "I Did" was popular with fans in spite of its low chart peak.

== Track listing ==
1. "Lonely Days, Lonely Nights" (Karen Staley) – 2:49
2. "I Did" (Loveless) – 2:47
3. "You Are Everything" (Guy Clark, Keith Sykes) – 2:27
4. "Blue Is Not a Word" (Jo-El Sonnier, Judy Ball) – 2:57
5. "Slow Healing Heart" (Jim Rushing) – 3:42
6. "After All" (Jimbeau Hinson, Harry Stinson) – 3:51
7. "Wicked Ways" (Staley) – 3:06
8. "Half Over You" (Staley) – 3:08
9. "Some Blue Moons Ago" (Steve Earle, Richard Bennett) – 2:19
10. "Sounds of Loneliness" (Loveless) – 4:18

== Personnel ==
- Linda Alosko - viola
- Richard Bennett - acoustic, electric & steel guitars
- Tony Brown - keyboards, synthesizers
- Larry Byrom - acoustic, electric & bass guitars
- John Catchings - cello
- Glen Duncan - fiddle
- Ray Flacke - acoustic & electric guitars
- Sara Fogel - viola
- Paul Franklin - steel guitar, dobro, pedabro
- Emory Gordy, Jr. - bass, acoustic guitars, string arrangements
- Jim Grosjean - viola
- John Barlow Jarvis - keyboards, piano
- Jerry Kroon - drums, percussion
- Patty Loveless - acoustic guitars, tambourine, lead & harmony vocals
- Mac McAnally - acoustic guitars
- Connie McCollister - violin, concertmaster
- Edgar Meyer - bass, double bass, cello
- Weldon Myrick - steel guitar
- Mary K. Parker - violin
- Reggie Young: Electric Guitars
- Paul Davis, Vince Gill, Lyle Lovett, Karen Staley, Harry Stinson - harmony vocals

Production

- Emory Gordy Jr., Tony Brown: producers
- Jeff Coppage: engineer, assistant engineer
- Mark J. Coddington: engineer, assistant engineer
- Tim Kish: engineer, assistant engineer
- Russ Martin: engineer, assistant engineer
- Robbie Rose: engineer
- Ron Treat: engineer, mixing
- Glenn Meadows: mastering

== Chart performance ==
Chart (1987)	Peak position
U.S. Billboard Top Country Albums	35
