= Sleepless Nights (Patty Loveless album) =

Studio album by Patty Loveless
- Released: September 9, 2008
- Genre: Country
- Length: 43:01
- Label: Saguaro Road
- Producer: Emory Gordy, Jr.

Patty Loveless chronology
Dreamin' My Dreams (2005)	Sleepless Nights (2008)	Mountain Soul II (2009)

Singles from Sleepless Nights
- 1. "Why Baby Why" Released: September 2008

Sleepless Nights is the fifteenth album by American country music artist Patty Loveless. The album was released on September 9, 2008 (see 2008 in country music). Her first album for the Saguaro Road Records label, it is also her first studio album since Dreamin' My Dreams in 2005. Sleepless Nights comprises cover versions of traditional classic country music songs. "Why Baby Why", a song originally recorded by George Jones which has also been a chart hit for several other artists, was released in September 2008 as the first single from the album.

== Critical reception ==
Professional ratings
Aggregate scores
Source	Rating
Metacritic	(78/100)
Review scores
Source	Rating
About.com	4.5/5 stars
Allmusic	4/5 stars
Billboard	(favorable)
The Daily Vault	A
Mojo	4/5 stars
PopMatters	7/10 stars
Q	3/5 stars
Slant Magazine	4.5/5 stars
Engine 145	4/5 stars

Allmusic critic Thom Jurek gave Sleepless Nights a four-star rating out of five, saying "Loveless takes each of these cuts deep into the well of her heart and let's [sic] them rip." Jurek also said that Emory Gordy, Jr., Loveless' husband and producer, "showers [the songs] in emotion and Loveless simply needs to open her mouth to tell the story behind the words to get it across to the listener, where it resonates deeply."

Matt C., a critic for Engine 145, also gave the album a four-out-of-five rating. He described Sleepless Nights as "a thoroughly arresting listening experience, as Loveless lays twenty-first century gloss, if not sensibilities, on a few songs that haven’t been dusted off in quite some time." Although he criticized the album's lack of up-tempo songs and felt that some of the covers were "uncomfortable", he nonetheless commended Loveless for "find[ing] her wheelhouse on songs that are no-less classic but nonetheless haven’t achieved corner bar ubiquity", also saying "The success of these songs is equal testament to Loveless’ outstanding country voice and the timeless quality of the material she’s selected."

Slant Magazine critic Jonathan Keefe also criticized the album for its lack up-tempo material, but gave it four-and-a-half stars out of five, saying "Loveless has offered another unqualified masterpiece with Sleepless Nights and reasserted her place as one of the premier artists not just of the country genre but of contemporary popular music."

Sleepless Nights received a nomination for Best Country Album at the 51st Annual Grammy Awards.

== Track listing ==
Track	Song title	Writer(s)	Original artist	Original release	Length
1	"Why Baby Why"	Darrell Edwards, George Jones	George Jones	1955	2:18
2	"The Pain of Loving You"	Dolly Parton, Porter Wagoner	Porter Wagoner & Dolly Parton	1971	2:46
3	"He Thinks I Still Care"	Dickey Lee	George Jones	1962	2:59
4	"Sleepless Nights" (featuring Vince Gill)	Boudleaux Bryant, Felice Bryant	Everly Brothers	1960	4:21
5	"Crazy Arms"	Ralph Mooney, Chuck Seals	Ray Price	1956	4:00
6	"There Stands the Glass"	Audrey Greisham, Russ Hull, Mary Jean Shurtz	Webb Pierce	1953	2:35
7	"That's All It Took" (featuring Jedd Hughes)	Darrell Edwards, Carlos Grier, Jones	George Jones & Gene Pitney	1966	2:35
8	"Color of the Blues"	Jones, Lawton Williams	George Jones	1958	3:06
9	"I Forgot More Than You'll Ever Know"	Cecil Null	The Davis Sisters	1953	3:30
10	"Next in Line"	Wayne Kemp, Curtis Wayne	Conway Twitty	1968	3:06
11	"Don't Let Me Cross Over"	Penny Jay	Carl Butler and Pearl	1962	3:23
12	"Please Help Me I'm Falling"	Hal Blair, Don Robertson	Hank Locklin	1960	2:40
13	"There Goes My Everything"	Dallas Frazier	Jack Greene	1966	2:50
14	"Cold, Cold Heart"	Hank Williams	Hank Williams	1951	2:53
15*	"We'll Sweep out the Ashes in the Morning"	Joyce Ann Allsup	Carl Butler & Pearl	1969	3:14
16*	"If Teardrops Were Pennies"	Carl Butler	Carl Smith	1951	2:38

.* Bonus Track, only available via download

== Personnel ==
- Harold Bradley – bass guitar, tic tac bass, archtop guitar
- Pete Finney – steel guitar
- Vince Gill – background vocals
- Emory Gordy, Jr. – bass guitar, acoustic guitar
- Steve Gibson – electric guitar
- John Hobbs – piano
- Jedd Hughes – background vocals
- Virgil Lee – background vocals
- Jim Iler – background vocals
- Billy Linneman – upright bass
- Patty Loveless – lead vocals
- Al Perkins – steel guitar
- Sydnie Perry – background vocals
- Carmella Ramsey – background vocals
- Deanie Richardson – fiddle, mandolin
- Hargus "Pig" Robbins – piano
- Harry Stinson – drums, background vocals
- Guthrie Trapp – electric guitar
- Biff Watson – acoustic guitar, electric guitar, archtop guitar

== Chart performance ==
Chart (2008)	Peak position
U.S. Billboard Top Country Albums	13
U.S. Billboard 200	86
