= Blue Memories =

Single by Patty Loveless

from the album On Down the Line (1990) Mountain Soul II (Album Track) (2009)
- B-side: "You Can't Run Away from Your Heart"
- Released: May 11, 1991
- Recorded: 1990
- Genre: Country
- Length: 2:52
- Label: MCA Nashville
- Songwriters: Paul Kennerley, Karen Brooks
- Producer: Tony Brown

Patty Loveless singles chronology
"I'm That Kind of Girl" (1991)	"Blue Memories" (1991)	"Hurt Me Bad (In a Real Good Way)" (1991)

Blue Memories is a song written by Karen Brooks and Paul Kennerley, and recorded by American country music artist Patty Loveless. It was released in May 1991 as the fourth single from her album On Down the Line.

The song charted for 17 weeks on the Billboard Hot Country Singles and Tracks chart, reaching number 22 during the week of 20 July 1991.

The song was re-recorded by Loveless for her Mountain Soul II album in 2009, with Vince Gill and Rebecca Lynn Howard as background singers with a Bluegrass music arrangement.

== Chart positions ==
Chart (1991)	Peak position
Canada Country Singles (RPM)	20
US Hot Country Songs (Billboard)	22
