= Hurt Me Bad (In a Real Good Way) =

Single by Patty Loveless

from the album Up Against My Heart
- B-side: "God Will"
- Released: September 7, 1991
- Recorded: 1991
- Genre: Country
- Length: 3:02
- Label: MCA Nashville
- Songwriters: Deborah Allen, Rafe Van Hoy
- Producers: Emory Gordy Jr., Tony Brown

Patty Loveless singles chronology
"Blue Memories" (1991)	"Hurt Me Bad (In a Real Good Way)" (1991)	"Jealous Bone" (1992)

"Hurt Me Bad (In a Real Good Way)" is a song written by Deborah Allen and Rafe Van Hoy, and recorded by American country music artist Patty Loveless. It was released in September 1991 as the first single from her album Up Against My Heart.

== Background ==
According to Loveless: "Hurt Me Bad ... actually Tony Brown was playing some stuff for me when we were looking for some songs for the fifth album for MCA. He played this one and he was telling me about Deborah Allen being a writer on it and her husband. We listened to it and it just hit me! The melody and just everything about it. I just loved the way she did the demo on it and just loved the way she sung the song. Even the idea of the song ... here's this person that's been hurt by one relationship... and now that this guy's out of her life .. she's found a better relationship! So I just fell in love with it! It was a lot of fun to do the video because of the fact that John Jorgenson made it a lot of fun, and John Millen, the director, made it a lot of fun to do too. We did it in New Orleans... spent three days there... just had a big ole' time shooting it there in the French Quarter"

The song charted for 20 weeks on the Billboard Hot Country Singles and Tracks chart, reaching #3 during the week of November 23, 1991.

== Chart positions ==
Chart (1991)	Peak position
Canada Country Singles (RPM)	6
US Hot Country Songs (Billboard)	3

=== Year-end charts ===
Chart (1991)	Position
Canada Country Tracks (RPM)	90
