= Jealous Bone =

Single by Patty Loveless

from the album Up Against My Heart
- B-side: "I Came Straight to You"
- Released: January 14, 1992
- Recorded: 1991
- Genre: Country
- Length: 2:41
- Label: MCA
- Songwriters: Steve Bogard, Rick Giles
- Producers: Emory Gordy Jr., Tony Brown

Patty Loveless singles chronology
"Hurt Me Bad (In a Real Good Way)" (1991)	"Jealous Bone" (1992)	"Can't Stop Myself from Loving You" (1992)

"Jealous Bone" is a song written by Steve Bogard and Rick Giles, and recorded by American country music artist Patty Loveless. It was released in January 1992 as the second single from her album Up Against My Heart.

== Music video ==
Jealous Bone being performed by Loveless on the NBC "Hot Country Nights" show, December 1991.

The music video released for this song gives the appearance of being filmed in concert. However, it was filmed as a video production in front of an audience of Loveless' fans.

The song charted for 20 weeks on the Billboard Hot Country Singles and Tracks chart, reaching number 13 during the week of March 26, 1992.

== Chart positions ==
Chart (1992)	Peak position
Canada Country Singles (RPM)	22
US Hot Country Songs (Billboard)	13
