= Dreamin' My Dreams (Patty Loveless album) =

Studio album by Patty Loveless
- Released: September 13, 2005
- Genre: Country
- Length: 49:23
- Label: Epic
- Producers: Emory Gordy, Jr. Justin Niebank

Patty Loveless chronology
On Your Way Home (2003)	Dreamin' My Dreams (2005)	Sleepless Nights (2008)

Singles from Dreamin' My Dreams
- 1. "Keep Your Distance" Released: September 2005

Dreamin' My Dreams is the fourteenth album of original recordings by Patty Loveless. Released in September 2005, the album debuted on the Billboard Top Country Albums chart on October 1, 2005 at #29 (its peak), staying on the charts for 8 weeks until November 26, 2005.

This was the last album that Patty Loveless recorded for Epic Records. She was with them since 1993's Only What I Feel. After the album was released, Epic closed its Nashville division, and Patty was dropped.

== Track listing ==
1. "Keep Your Distance" (Richard Thompson) – 3:49
2. "Old Soul" (Lee Roy Parnell, Tony Arata) – 5:33
3. "When Being Who You Are Is Not Enough" (Jim Lauderdale, Leslie Satcher) – 3:16
4. "Nobody Here by That Name" (Arata, Pete Wasner) – 3:56
5. "Same Kind of Crazy" (Delbert McClinton, Gary Nicholson) – 3:45
6. "Everything But the Words" (Lauderdale, Satcher) – 4:09
7. "Dreaming My Dreams with You" (Allen Reynolds) – 4:43
8. "On the Verge of Tears" (Thom Schuyler) – 3:19
9. "Never Ending Song of Love" (Delaney Bramlett) – 2:56
  - duet with Dwight Yoakam
10. "Big Chance" (Patty Loveless, Emory Gordy, Jr.) – 2:52
11. "My Old Friend the Blues" (Steve Earle) 2:58
12. "When I Reach the Place I'm Going" (Gordy, Joe Henry) – 7:45

== Personnel ==
As listed in liner notes.

- Barry Bales – upright bass
- Tom Britt – slide guitar, tremolo guitar
- Kathy Burdick – background vocals
- Burnt Hickory "Ooh Aah" Choir – vocal pads
- Stuart Duncan – fiddle, octave fiddle, mandolin
- Emory Gordy, Jr. – bass guitar, Ernie Ball bass guitar, upright bass, acoustic guitar, fingerstyle guitar
- Owen Hale – drums
- Emmylou Harris – background vocals
- Tim Hensley – background vocals
- Rob Ickes – Dobro, Scheerhorn acoustic slide guitar
- Albert Lee – electric guitar
- Butch Lee – Telecaster and Owens tenor guitar, Ernie Ball bass guitar, background vocals
- Virgie Lee – background vocals
- Patty Loveless – lead vocals
- Claire Lynch – background vocals
- Ronnie McCoury – mandolin, Gilchrist mandolin
- Russ Pahl – steel guitar
- Lee Roy Parnell – slide guitar
- Carmella Ramsey – background vocals
- Jon Randall – background vocals, mandolin
- Deanie Richardson – fiddle, mandolin, Owens tenor guitar
- Harry Stinson – background vocals
- Bryan Sutton – acoustic guitar, banjo
- Guthrie Trapp – rhythm electric guitar, sock rhythm guitar (Gibson L7)
- Biff Watson – acoustic guitar

== Content ==
Professional ratings
Review scores
Source	Rating
About.com	5/5 stars
Allmusic	4.5/5 stars
BBC Music	(average)
Entertainment Weekly	B+
The Music Box	3/5 stars
No Depression	(positive)
Paste	(average)
People	3.5/4 stars
Slant Magazine	3.5/5 stars

"Never Ending Song of Love" was recorded a duet with fellow Pikeville, Kentucky native Dwight Yoakam. The original version of “Never Ending Song of Love” was recorded by Delaney and Bonnie Bramlett as a rock/soul song (It was Billboard's #67 top 100 pop single of 1971). It is the second time that they have recorded together. They had previously recorded "Send a Message to My Heart" on Yoakam's album If There Was a Way, released in 1992.

The album's title song was recorded by Loveless in memory of Waylon Jennings. It was written by record producer-songwriter Allen Reynolds and was originally recorded in 1975 by both Jennings (on his album Dreaming My Dreams) and Crystal Gayle (on her album Somebody Loves You) when Reynolds was Gayle's record producer. The track "When I Reach the Place I'm Going" was originally recorded by Wynonna Judd on her debut album.

== Copy protection controversy ==
In November 2005, it was revealed that Sony BMG was distributing albums with Extended Copy Protection, a controversial feature that automatically installed rootkit software on any Microsoft Windows machine upon insertion of the disc. In addition to preventing the CDs contents from being copied, it was also revealed that the software reported the users' listening habits back to Sony BMG and also exposed the computer to malicious attacks that exploited insecure features of the rootkit software. Dreamin' My Dreams was listed among the 52 CDs that were known to contain the software, of which the usage by Sony was discontinued on November 11, 2005, when Sony BMG recalled this and other titles affected by XCP, and asked customers to return copies affected by the software to Sony BMG in exchange for copies that were devoid of the controversial technology.

== Chart performance ==
Chart (2005)	Peak position
U.S. Billboard Top Country Albums	29
U.S. Billboard 200	175
