= The Lonely Side of Love =

Single by Patty Loveless

from the album Honky Tonk Angel
- B-side: "I'll Never Grow Tired of You"
- Released: September 9, 1989
- Recorded: 1988
- Genre: Country
- Length: 3:02
- Label: MCA Nashville
- Songwriter: Kostas
- Producer: Tony Brown

Patty Loveless singles chronology
| "Timber, I'm Falling in Love" (1989) | "The Lonely Side of Love" (1989) | "Chains" (1989) |

"The Lonely Side of Love" is a song written by Kostas, and recorded by American country music artist Patty Loveless. It was released in September 1989 as the fourth single from her album Honky Tonk Angel.

== Background ==
This follow-up single to Loveless' number 1 song "Timber" reached number 6 in December, 1989 and is one of her classic country ballad songs about love and heartache. It was written by Kostas, who also wrote "Timber"

The song charted for 30 weeks (her longest to date) on the Billboard Hot Country Singles and Tracks chart, reaching number 6 during the week of December 2, 1989.

== Chart positions ==
| Chart (1989) | Peak position |
|---|---|
| Canada Country Singles (RPM) | 5 |
| US Hot Country Songs (Billboard) | 6 |

=== Year-end charts ===
| Chart (1989) | Position |
|---|---|
| Canada Country Tracks (RPM) | 88 |
