= Don't Toss Us Away =

Single by Patty Loveless

from the album Honky Tonk Angel
- B-side: "I Won't Gamble With Your Love"
- Released: February 14, 1989
- Recorded: 1988
- Genre: Country
- Length: 4:11
- Label: MCA Nashville
- Songwriter: Bryan MacLean
- Producer: Tony Brown

Patty Loveless singles chronology
| "Blue Side of Town" (1988) | "Don't Toss Us Away" (1989) | "Timber, I'm Falling in Love" (1989) |

Music video
- "Don't Toss Us Away" on YouTube

"Don't Toss Us Away" is a song written by Bryan MacLean and recorded by country rock band Lone Justice in 1985 on their self-titled debut album. In 1988, the song was recorded by American country music singer Patty Loveless, who released it as the second single from her album Honky Tonk Angel, in February 1989. Loveless' version reached the number five position on the Billboard Hot Country Singles chart in May 1989.

== Background ==
Loveless and her brother, Roger Ramey, heard the song while driving with Tony Brown. All of them agreed it would be a good song for her to record, as the ballad fit her vocal style quite well. Maria McKee, songwriter Bryan MacLean's sister and Lone Justice singer, told Loveless at the studio that she was singing/recording the song the way her brother had always intended.

== Chart positions ==
The song charted for 17 weeks on the Billboard Hot Country Singles chart, reaching number 5 during the week of May 6, 1989.

| Chart (1989) | Peak position |
|---|---|
| Canada Country Singles (RPM) | 15 |
| US Hot Country Songs (Billboard) | 5 |

=== Year-end charts ===
| Chart (1989) | Position |
|---|---|
| US Country Songs (Billboard) | 68 |
