= Chains (Patty Loveless song) =

Single by Patty Loveless

from the album Honky Tonk Angel
- B-side: "I'm On Your Side"
- Released: December 1989
- Recorded: May 1988
- Genre: Country
- Length: 2:27
- Label: MCA Nashville 53764
- Songwriters: Hal Bynum; Bud Reneau
- Producer: Tony Brown

Patty Loveless singles chronology
"The Lonely Side of Love" (1989)	"Chains" (1989)	"On Down the Line" (1990)

Music video
- "Chains" on YouTube

"Chains" is a song written by Hal Bynum and Bud Reneau, and recorded by American country music artist Patty Loveless. It was released in December 1989 as the fifth single from her album Honky Tonk Angel.

== Background ==
"Chains" was Loveless's second career No. 1 hit, with both this song and the earlier "Timber I'm Falling In Love" coming from Honky Tonk Angel.

In its original form, the song had a much slower tempo than the one recorded by Loveless. Tony Brown, one of her producers at the time, decided to speed up the tempo for the arrangement she recorded.

The song charted for 26 weeks on the Billboard Hot Country Singles and Tracks chart, reaching No. 1 during the week of March 10, 1990.

== Charts ==
=== Weekly charts ===
Chart (1989–1990)	Peak position
Canada Country Singles (RPM)	1
US Hot Country Songs (Billboard)	1

=== Year-end charts ===
Chart (1990)	Position
Canada Country Tracks (RPM)	41
US Country Songs (Billboard)	9
