= On Down the Line (song) =

Single by Patty Loveless

from the album On Down the Line
- B-side: "Feelings of Love"
- Released: May 19, 1990
- Recorded: 1990
- Genre: Country
- Length: 3:10
- Label: MCA Nashville
- Songwriter: Kostas
- Producer: Tony Brown

Patty Loveless singles chronology
"Chains" (1989)	"On Down the Line" (1990)	"The Night's Too Long" (1990)

"On Down the Line" is a song written by Kostas, and recorded by American country music artist Patty Loveless. It was released in May 1990 as the first single and title track from her album On Down the Line.

== Background ==
The song derived from a collection of compositions written by Kostas, who was the composer of "Timber, I'm Falling in Love" and many other songs that Loveless had recorded. When Tony Brown (Loveless' producer at the time) became aware of the song, he was extremely doubtful that it would fit Loveless’ repertoire, mainly because of questionable lyric content in the third verse. As a direct result, Kostas reconstructed the last verse to be appropriately suitable to Loveless.

The song charted for 20 weeks on the Billboard Hot Country Singles and Tracks chart, reaching No. 5 during the week of July 21, 1990.

== Chart positions ==
Chart (1990)	Peak position
Canada Country Singles (RPM)	3
US Hot Country Songs (Billboard)	5

=== Year-end charts ===
Chart (1990)	Position
Canada Country Tracks (RPM)	27
US Country Songs (Billboard)	54
