= If My Heart Had Windows (song) =

Single by George Jones

from the album If My Heart Had Windows
- B-side: "The Honky Tonk Downstairs"
- Released: October 7, 1967
- Genre: Country
- Length: 2:45
- Label: Musicor
- Songwriter(s): Dallas Frazier
- Producer(s): Pappy Daily

George Jones singles chronology
"Party Pickin'" (1967)	"If My Heart Had Windows" (1967)	"Say It's Not You" (1968)

"If My Heart Had Windows"
- From Grand Ole' Opry induction performance, 11 June 1988

Single by Patty Loveless

from the album If My Heart Had Windows
- B-side: "So Good to Be in Love"
- Released: February 6, 1988
- Recorded: 1987
- Genre: Country
- Length: 3:02
- Label: MCA
- Songwriter(s): Dallas Frazier
- Producer(s): Emory Gordy Jr. Tony Brown

Patty Loveless singles chronology
"You Saved Me" (1987)	"If My Heart Had Windows" (1988)	"A Little Bit in Love" (1988)

Music video
- "If My Heart Had Windows" on YouTube

"If My Heart Had Windows" is a country song written by Dallas Frazier and recorded by George Jones in 1967 on his album of the same name. Released as a single that year, Jones's version peaked at number seven on the Billboard Hot Country Singles charts.

In 1968, crooner Andy Russell performed a cover version (Capitol #2072) that peaked at number 29 on the Billboard Adult Contemporary Singles Chart.

Ernest Tubb also recorded a version on his 1968 Decca release Country Hit Time.

Connie Smith also recorded a version on her 1970 RCA release I Never Once Stopped Loving You.

Twenty-one years after the original version, Patty Loveless recorded a cover of the song on her 1987 album, also entitled If My Heart Had Windows. Loveless's version was also a top-10 country hit — the first of her career — peaking at number 10 on the country music charts. It was also the song that she performed the evening that she was inducted into the membership of the Grand Ole Opry.

== Chart positions ==
=== George Jones ===
Chart (1967)	Peak position
US Hot Country Songs (Billboard)	7

=== Andy Russell ===
Chart (1968)	Peak position
US Adult Contemporary (Billboard)	29

=== Patty Loveless ===
Chart (1988)	Peak position
US Hot Country Songs (Billboard)	10
Canadian RPM Country Tracks	9
