= Timber, I'm Falling in Love =

Single by Patty Loveless

from the album Honky Tonk Angel
- B-side: "Go On"
- Released: May 27, 1989
- Recorded: 1988
- Genre: Neotraditional country; progressive country
- Length: 2:30
- Label: MCA
- Songwriter: Kostas
- Producer: Tony Brown

Patty Loveless singles chronology
"Don't Toss Us Away" (1989)	"Timber, I'm Falling in Love" (1989)	"The Lonely Side of Love" (1989)

"Timber, I'm Falling in Love" is a song written by Kostas, and recorded by American country music artist Patty Loveless. It was released in May 1989 as the third single from her album Honky Tonk Angel.

== Background ==
"Timber, I'm Falling in Love" was Loveless' first No. 1 record on Billboard's Hot Country Singles chart. The song charted for 18 weeks on the Billboard Hot Country Singles and Tracks chart, reaching the top of the chart during the week of August 12, 1989. Vince Gill provides background vocals.

The song appears in the movie A Few Good Men in the seafood restaurant scene.

This song was covered on the fourth season of The Voice by winner Danielle Bradbery in a duet with her coach, Blake Shelton.

== Charts ==
=== Weekly charts ===
Chart (1989)	Peak position
Canada Country Singles (RPM)	1
US Hot Country Songs (Billboard)	1

=== Year-end charts ===
Chart (1989)	Position
Canada Country Tracks (RPM)	42
US Country Songs (Billboard)	35
