= Kostas (songwriter) =

American songwriter

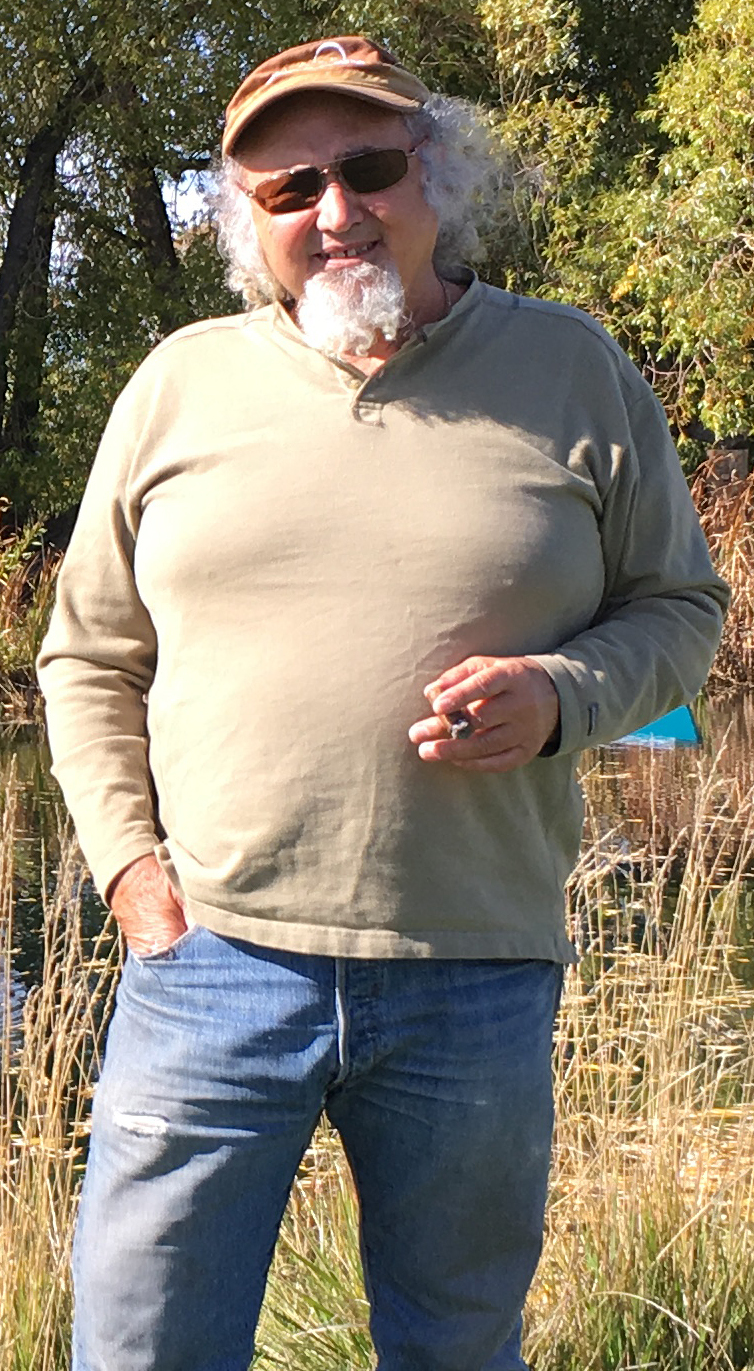
- Kostas in 2016.

Background information
- Born: Kostas Lazarides; April 14, 1949 (age 76); Thessaloniki, Greece
- Origin: Billings, Montana, U.S.
- Genres: Country
- Occupation: Songwriter
- Years active: 1989-present
- Labels: Liberty

Kostas Lazarides (Greek: Κώστας Λαζαρίδης; born April 14, 1949) is a Greek-born American country music songwriter, known professionally as Kostas. He has written for several country music artists, including Dwight Yoakam, Patty Loveless, George Strait, and Travis Tritt, and has won eleven awards from Broadcast Music Incorporated (BMI). In addition, he has recorded a self-titled album Kostas on First American Records (1980) and an album entitled X S in Moderation on Liberty Records (1994). He was inducted into the Nashville Songwriters Hall of Fame in 2019.

== Biography ==
Kostas Lazarides was born in Thessaloniki, Greece. When he was seven years old, he and his family moved to the United States, taking up residence in Billings, Montana. Lazarides eventually began identifying himself by the singular name Kostas.

== Musical career ==
Kostas performed in Montana as a singer and songwriter throughout the 1980s. Eventually, he was discovered by record producer Tony Brown, who was searching for new material for country singer Patty Loveless. Kostas' first cut as a songwriter, "Timber, I'm Falling in Love", was recorded by Loveless; released as a single in 1989, it went to number one on the Billboard country charts, becoming Loveless's first number one hit. She would also release three more of his songs as singles: "The Lonely Side of Love" (1989), "On Down the Line" (1990), and "Blame It On Your Heart" (1993). "Blame It on Your Heart" also earned BMI's Robert J. Burton award for being the most performed single of 1994.

Dwight Yoakam also recorded several songs written by Kostas, including "Nothing's Changed Here", "Turn It On, Turn It Up, Turn Me Loose", and "Send a Message to My Heart" (a duet with Loveless), all of which were released as singles from Yoakam's 1990 album If There Was a Way. Yoakam's 1993 album, This Time, included another song co-written by Kostas: the single "Ain't That Lonely Yet", which earned Yoakam a Grammy Award for Best Country Vocal Performance - Male in 1994. During the early 1990s, Kostas also wrote singles for McBride & the Ride, Travis Tritt, Holly Dunn, Martina McBride, and The Mavericks.

CCMA and Juno Award-winning Canadian country music group Prairie Oyster recorded songs written by Kostas on two of their most popular albums. As a result, Kostas developed a sizable following in Canada, which has enabled him to tour and perform in several provinces.

In 1980, Kostas released a self-titled album on First American Records.

In 1994, Kostas signed to Liberty Records as a recording artist. X S in Moderation, was released that year. The album, which included his own renditions of the singles that he had written, was part of a special songwriters' series by Liberty.

== Partial credits ==
The following singles were written or co-written by Kostas:

- Dixie Chicks – "I Can Love You Better"
- Holly Dunn – "Heart Full of Love"
- Farmer's Daughter - "You and Only You"
- Sammy Kershaw – "Your Tattoo"
- Patty Loveless – "Timber, I'm Falling in Love", "The Lonely Side of Love", "On Down the Line", "Can't Stop Myself from Loving You", "Blame It on Your Heart", "High on Love", "Out of Control Raging Fire" (with Travis Tritt), "Looking in the Eyes of Love" (with Tricia Walker)
- The Mavericks – "Here Comes the Rain", "There Goes My Heart", "What a Crying Shame"
- Martina McBride – "Life #9"
- McBride & the Ride – "Going Out of My Mind", "Love on the Loose, Heart on the Run"
- Jo Dee Messina – "Because You Love Me"
- Shane Minor – "Slave to the Habit"
- Perfect Stranger – "Ridin' the Rodeo"
- Marty Stuart – "You Can't Stop Love"
- Travis Tritt – "Lord Have Mercy on the Working Man"
- Joy Lynn White – "True Confessions"
- Kelly Willis - "Baby Take a Piece of My Heart"
- Dwight Yoakam – "Nothing's Changed Here", "Turn It On, Turn It Up, Turn Me Loose", "Ain't That Lonely Yet", "Send a Message to My Heart" (w/ Patty Loveless), "Try Not to Look So Pretty", "Nothing"
