= Emory Gordy Jr. =

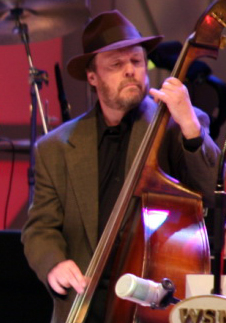
- Emory Gordy Jr., Grand Ole Opry, 2007

Background information
- Born: Emory Lee Gordy Jr. December 25, 1944 (age 81); Atlanta, Georgia, United States
- Occupations: Record producer; musician
- Instruments: Bass guitar; upright bass
- Years active: 1964–present
- Formerly of: The Hot Band
- Spouse: Patty Loveless (m. 1989)

Emory Lee Gordy Jr. (born December 25, 1944) is an American musician, songwriter and music producer. A former member of Emmylou Harris' backing band The Hot Band, he is best known for his association with country singer Patty Loveless, to whom he has been married since 1989. Gordy has produced and played bass guitar on nearly all of her albums, in addition to producing albums by Steve Earle, George Jones, and Alabama.

== Early life ==
Gordy started his musical education by age four at the piano. At six he had begun to tackle the trumpet and would soon learn the banjo, euphonium, guitar, and ukulele. In high school Gordy divided his time and talents between string bands, Dixieland bands, and a top 40 garage band, honing his musical skills and learning to arrange music. After graduation, he continued his musical studies at Middle Georgia State University and later Georgia State University, performing French horn in the concert band.

== Career ==
=== Early years ===
Gordy began his career as a studio musician in Atlanta in 1964 when he was asked to fill in during a performance by Tommy Roe at a local concert. A week later he got the proverbial phone call; on the other end of the line was Joe South, an Atlanta-based record producer who had covered Roe on guitar alongside Gordy the week before. Soon Gordy was working alongside Roe, Mac Davis, The Tams and Freddy Weller, as well as touring with Lou Christie, and Billy Joe Royal. With Buddy Buie and J.R. Cobb, he is a co-writer on the Classics IV hit "Traces", listed as number 32 in BMI's Top 100 Songs of the Century. He also arranged Roy Orbison's "Walk On" and The Winston's "Color Him Father".

=== Musician/touring ===
Photo from an article about Emory Gordy Jr., taken in 1973

Gordy moved to Los Angeles in early 1970 and continued working as a studio musician. Along with the studio work, he supplemented with engineering and production work for Debbie Reynolds and Liberace. In 1971, he had the opportunity to tour as a bass player with Neil Diamond and played multiple instruments (including guitar, mandolin, percussion, and vibes) in the recording sessions that led up to Diamond's million-selling Hot August Night.

In 1972, Gordy worked with Elvis Presley, playing bass on Separate Ways and Burning Love. He toured with Presley in 1973, playing bass for Elvis Presley's TCB Band. Later, along with fellow Presley band members James Burton, Glen D. Hardin and Ronnie Tutt, he accompanied Gram Parsons and Emmylou Harris on Parson's Grievous Angel album, released the year after Parsons's untimely death in 1973.

In the mid-1970s, he was an original member of Emmylou Harris's Hot Band along with James Burton, Glen D. Hardin, John Ware, Rodney Crowell and Hank Devito. Remaining with Harris until 1977, Gordy continued to get calls from L.A. studios, where he played bass on projects by The Bellamy Brothers, Billy Joel and Tom Petty. Gordy would go on to play in Rodney Crowell and Rosanne Cash’s supergroup, The Cherry Bombs, alongside other soon-to-be Nashville luminaries: guitarist Richard Bennett, keyboard player Tony Brown and Vince Gill on guitar.

By 1979 he joined John Denver’s band, touring the U.S., Australia and Europe and later composing the bass tracks for two of Denver’s albums.

Gordy played on Phil Seymour's 1981 self-titled debut solo album for Boardwalk Records, including the hit single "Precious to Me". Gordy credits that involvement with Shelter Records and its owner Denny Cordell as a meaningful introduction to the rock genre.

In 1986, Gordy was one of several musicians who backed Nanci Griffith as she showcased tracks from her 'Lone Star State Of Mind' album on The Nashville Network TV show 'New Country'.

=== Studio producer ===
Pivoting from major touring in 1983, Gordy became a staff producer at MCA Records Nashville, where he co-produced Steve Earle's seminal releases Exit 0 and Guitar Town with Tony Brown. Gordy also produced George Jones' Walls Can Fall, which won the CMA Vocal Event of the Year for I Don't Need Your Rockin' Chair, Bill Monroe's Southern Flavor, winning the first Grammy for Best Bluegrass Album and artists Nicolette Larson, Rider's In the Sky, Brenda Lee and his future wife, Patty Loveless. Leaving MCA Records for independent production, Gordy produced Alabama's In Pictures and Christmas Vol. II, Vince Gill's Turn Me Loose and The Things That Matter, and Aaron Tippin's You've Got To Stand For Something and Read Between the Lines for RCA Records. Other notable productions include Jimmie Dale Gilmore's Spinning Around The Sun for Elektra Records, Delbert McClinton's One Of the Fortunate Few for Rising Tide Records and Shawn Camp's 1995 for Warner Bros. Records.

=== Current activities ===
Active until the mid-2000s, today Gordy is now in semi-retirement and spends most of his time at his home northwest of Atlanta. He still writes, occasionally travels to Nashville as a studio musician for one of his friends, engineers vocals at his home studio, and is seen playing guitar at most of his wife's yearly Nashville appearances at the Grand Ole Opry. He is also an avid ham radio operator and third degree black belt in Karate.

Gordy was inducted into the Georgia Music Hall of Fame in 1992. His wife, Patty Loveless joined him in the GMHOF in 2005. Gordy was named the first Alumnus of the Year for Middle Georgia State University in 2015.
