= List of awards and nominations received by Vince Gill =

Vince Gill awards and nominations
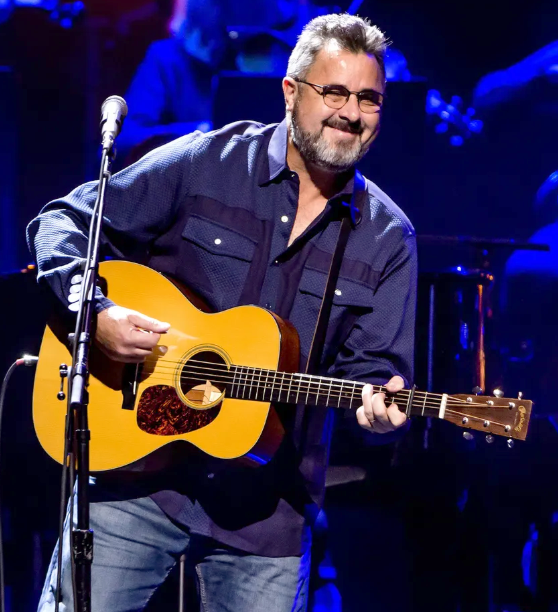
- Gill in 2019
Awards and nominations
Award	Wins	Nominations
Academy of Country Music Awards	8	37
Country Music Association Awards	18	54
Grammy Awards	22	48

Totals (Note: Certain award groups do not simply award one winner. They acknowledge several different recipients, have runners-up, and have third place. Since this is a specific recognition and is different from losing an award, runner-up mentions are considered wins in this award tally. For simplification and to avoid errors, each award in this list has been presumed to have had a prior nomination.)
- Wins: 48
- Nominations: 139

American country music singer Vince Gill has won 22 Grammy Awards, eight Academy of Country Music awards, and 18 Country Music Association awards. His first award came in 1984, when the Academy of Country Music named him Top New Male Vocalist. Gill's total of 22 Grammy Awards is the highest among male country music singers.

== List of awards ==
Year	Association	Category	Nominated work	Result
1984	Academy of Country Music	Top New Male Vocalist	—N/a	Won
1990	Academy of Country Music	Song of the Year	"When I Call Your Name"	Nominated
1990	Academy of Country Music	Single of the Year	"When I Call Your Name"	Nominated
1990	Academy of Country Music	Album of the Year	When I Call Your Name	Nominated
1990	Academy of Country Music	Top Vocal Duet	"Oklahoma Swing" (with Reba McEntire)	Nominated
1990	Academy of Country Music	Top Male Vocalist	—N/a	Nominated
1990	Country Music Association	Single of the Year	"When I Call Your Name"	Won
1990	Country Music Association	Song of the Year	"When I Call Your Name"	Nominated
1990	Country Music Association	Vocal Event of the Year	"Oklahoma Swing" (with Reba McEntire)	Nominated
1991	Academy of Country Music	Song of the Year	"Pocket Full of Gold"	Nominated
1991	Academy of Country Music	Top Male Vocalist	—N/a	Nominated
1991	Country Music Association	Male Vocalist of the Year	—N/a	Won
1991	Country Music Association	Song of the Year	"When I Call Your Name"	Won
1991	Country Music Association	Vocal Event of the Year	"Restless" (among Mark O'Connor and the New Nashville Cats) (Note: The New Nashville Cats were Vince Gill, Steve Wariner, and Ricky Skaggs.)	Won
1991	Country Music Association	Album of the Year	Pocket Full of Gold	Nominated
1991	Country Music Association	Entertainer of the Year	—N/a	Nominated
1991	Country Music Association	Single of the Year	"Pocket Full of Gold"	Nominated
1991	Grammy Awards	Best Male Country Vocal Performance	"When I Call Your Name"	Won
1991	Grammy Awards	Best Country Song	"When I Call Your Name"	Nominated
1992	Academy of Country Music	Song of the Year	"I Still Believe in You"	Won
1992	Academy of Country Music	Top Male Vocalist	—N/a	Won
1992	Academy of Country Music	Video of the Year	"Don't Let Our Love Start Slippin' Away"	Nominated
1992	Country Music Association	Male Vocalist of the Year	—N/a	Won
1992	Country Music Association	Song of the Year	"Look at Us"	Won
1992	Country Music Association	Single of the Year	"Look at Us"	Nominated
1992	Country Music Association	Music Video of the Year	"Look at Us"	Nominated
1992	Country Music Association	Entertainer of the Year	—N/a	Nominated
1992	Grammy Awards	Best Country Collaboration with Vocals	"Restless" (among Mark O'Connor and the New Nashville Cats)	Won
1992	Grammy Awards	Best Male Country Vocal Performance	Pocket Full of Gold	Nominated
1993	Academy of Country Music	Top Male Vocalist	—N/a	Won
1993	Academy of Country Music	Album of the Year	Common Thread: The Songs of the Eagles (among various artists)	Nominated
1993	Academy of Country Music	Album of the Year	I Still Believe in You	Nominated
1993	Academy of Country Music	Top Vocal Duet	"The Heart Won't Lie" (with Reba McEntire)	Nominated
1993	Country Music Association	Album of the Year	I Still Believe in You	Won
1993	Country Music Association	Entertainer of the Year	—N/a	Won
1993	Country Music Association	Male Vocalist of the Year	—N/a	Won
1993	Country Music Association	Song of the Year	"I Still Believe in You"	Won
1993	Country Music Association	Vocal Event of the Year	"I Don't Need Your Rockin' Chair" (among George Jones and friends) (Note: Song features Vince Gill, Mark Chesnutt, Garth Brooks, Travis Tritt, Joe Diffie, Alan Jackson, Pam Tillis, T. Graham Brown, Patty Loveless, and Clint Black.)	Won
1993	Country Music Association	Music Video of the Year	"Don't Let Our Love Start Slippin' Away"	Nominated
1993	Country Music Association	Single of the Year	"Don't Let Our Love Start Slippin' Away"	Nominated
1993	Country Music Association	Vocal Event of the Year	"The Heart Won't Lie" (with Reba McEntire)	Nominated
1993	Grammy Awards	Best Country Song	"I Still Believe in You"	Won
1993	Grammy Awards	Best Male Country Vocal Performance	"I Still Believe in You"	Won
1994	Academy of Country Music	Top Male Vocalist	—N/a	Nominated
1994	Academy of Country Music	Album of the Year	When Love Finds You	Nominated
1994	Academy of Country Music	Song of the Year	"When Love Finds You"	Nominated
1994	Academy of Country Music	Single of the Year	"Tryin' to Get Over You"	Nominated
1994	Country Music Association	Album of the Year	Common Thread: The Songs of the Eagles (among various artists)	Won
1994	Country Music Association	Album of the Year	Tribute to the Music of Bob Wills and the Texas Playboys (among Asleep at the Wheel and various artists)	Nominated
1994	Country Music Association	Album of the Year	Rhythm, Country and Blues (among various artists)	Nominated
1994	Country Music Association	Entertainer of the Year	—N/a	Won
1994	Country Music Association	Male Vocalist of the Year	—N/a	Won
1994	Grammy Awards	Best Country Instrumental Performance	"Red Wing" (among Asleep at the Wheel, Eldon Shamblin, Johnny Gimble, Chet Atkins, Marty Stuart, and Lucky Oceans)	Won
1994	Grammy Awards	Best Country Collaboration with Vocals	"The Heart Won't Lie" (with Reba McEntire)	Nominated
1995	Academy of Country Music	Top Vocal Duet	"I Will Always Love You" (with Dolly Parton)	Nominated
1995	Academy of Country Music	Top Male Vocalist	—N/a	Nominated
1995	Country Music Association	Male Vocalist of the Year	—N/a	Won
1995	Country Music Association	Entertainer of the Year	—N/a	Nominated
1995	Country Music Association	Album of the Year	When Love Finds You	Nominated
1995	Country Music Association	Music Video of the Year	"When Love Finds You"	Nominated
1995	Grammy Awards	Best Male Country Vocal Performance	"When Love Finds You"	Won
1995	Grammy Awards	Best Country Song	"When Love Finds You"	Nominated
1995	Grammy Awards	Best Country Album	When Love Finds You	Nominated
1996	Academy of Country Music	Top Male Vocalist	—N/a	Nominated
1996	Country Music Association	Vocal Event of the Year	"I Will Always Love You" (with Dolly Parton)	Won
1996	Country Music Association	Song of the Year	"Go Rest High on That Mountain"	Won
1996	Country Music Association	Single of the Year	"Go Rest High on That Mountain"	Nominated
1996	Country Music Association	Music Video of the Year	"Go Rest High on That Mountain"	Nominated
1996	Country Music Association	Album of the Year	High Lonesome Sound	Nominated
1996	Country Music Association	Entertainer of the Year	—N/a	Nominated
1996	Country Music Association	Male Vocalist of the Year	—N/a	Nominated
1996	Grammy Awards	Best Country Song	"Go Rest High on That Mountain"	Won
1996	Grammy Awards	Best Male Country Vocal Performance	"Go Rest High on That Mountain"	Won
1996	Grammy Awards	Best Country Collaboration with Vocals	"I Will Always Love You" (with Dolly Parton)	Nominated
1997	Country Music Association	Entertainer of the Year	—N/a	Nominated
1997	Country Music Association	Male Vocalist of the Year	—N/a	Nominated
1997	Grammy Awards	Best Country Collaboration with Vocals	"High Lonesome Sound" (with Alison Krauss & Union Station)	Won
1997	Grammy Awards	Best Male Country Vocal Performance	"Worlds Apart"	Won
1997	Grammy Awards	Best Country Album	High Lonesome Sound	Nominated
1997	Grammy Awards	Best Country Song	"High Lonesome Sound"	Nominated
1997	Grammy Awards	Best Country Collaboration with Vocals	"Hope: Country Music's Quest for a Cure" (among various artists (Note: Song features John Berry, Terri Clark, Vince Gill, Faith Hill, Tracy Lawrence, Little Texas, Neal McCoy, Tim McGraw, Lorrie Morgan, Marty Stuart, Travis Tritt, and Trisha Yearwood))	Nominated
1998	Academy of Country Music	Top Male Vocalist	—N/a	Nominated
1998	Academy of Country Music	Vocal Event of the Year	"No Place That Far" (with Sara Evans)	Nominated
1998	Country Music Association	Entertainer of the Year	—N/a	Nominated
1998	Country Music Association	Male Vocalist of the Year	—N/a	Nominated
1998	Grammy Awards	Best Male Country Vocal Performance	"Pretty Little Adriana"	Won
1999	Academy of Country Music	Guitarist of the Year	—N/a	Nominated
1999	Academy of Country Music	Vocal Event of the Year	"My Kind of Woman/My Kind of Man" (with Patty Loveless)	Nominated
1999	Country Music Association	Vocal Event of the Year	"My Kind of Woman/My Kind of Man" (with Patty Loveless)	Won
1999	Country Music Association	Vocal Event of the Year	"No Place That Far" (with Sara Evans)	Nominated
1999	Country Music Association	Album of the Year	The Key	Nominated
1999	Country Music Association	Male Vocalist of the Year	—N/a	Nominated
1999	Country Music Association	Song of the Year	"If You Ever Have Forever in Mind"	Nominated
1999	Grammy Awards	Best Country Instrumental Performance	"A Soldier's Joy" (with Randy Scruggs)	Won
1999	Grammy Awards	Best Male Country Vocal Performance	"If You Ever Have Forever in Mind"	Won
1999	Grammy Awards	Best Country Song	"If You Ever Have Forever in Mind"	Nominated
1999	Grammy Awards	Best Country Collaboration with Vocals	"My Kind of Woman/My Kind of Man" (with Patty Loveless)	Nominated
2000	Country Music Association	Male Vocalist of the Year	—N/a	Nominated
2000	Grammy Awards	Best Country Instrumental Performance	"Bob's Breakdowns" (among Asleep at the Wheel, Tommy Allsup, Floyd Domino, Larry Franklin, and Steve Wariner)	Won
2000	Grammy Awards	Best Male Country Vocal Performance	"Don't Come Cryin' to Me"	Nominated
2001	Grammy Awards	Best Country Album	Let's Make Sure We Kiss Goodbye	Nominated
2001	Grammy Awards	Best Country Song	"Feels Like Love"	Nominated
2001	Grammy Awards	Best Male Country Vocal Performance	"Feels Like Love"	Nominated
2001	Grammy Awards	Best Country Collaboration with Vocals	"When I Look into Your Heart" (with Amy Grant)	Nominated
2002	Grammy Awards	Best Country Instrumental Performance	"Foggy Mountain Breakdown" (among Glen Duncan, Earl Scruggs, Albert Lee, Steve Martin, Gary Scruggs, Randy Scruggs, and Marty Stuart)	Won
2003	Academy of Country Music	Vocal Event of the Year	"Young Man's Town" (with Emmylou Harris)	Nominated
2004	Grammy Awards	Best Male Country Vocal Performance	"Next Big Thing"	Won
2005	Academy of Country Music	The Home Depot Humanitarian Award	—N/a	Won
2005	Grammy Awards	Best Country Song	"It's Hard to Kiss the Lips at Night That Chew Your Ass Out All Day Long" (among The Notorious Cherry Bombs)	Nominated
2005	Grammy Awards	Best Country Performance by a Duo or Group with Vocal	"It's Hard to Kiss the Lips at Night That Chew Your Ass Out All Day Long" (among The Notorious Cherry Bombs)	Nominated
2005	Grammy Awards	Best Country Instrumental Performance	"Luxury Liner" (with Albert Lee and Brad Paisley)	Nominated
2006	Academy of Country Music	Album of the Year	These Days	Nominated
2006	Academy of Country Music	Vocal Event of the Year	"Building Bridges" (with Brooks & Dunn and Sheryl Crow)	Won
2006	Country Music Association	Musical Event of the Year	"Building Bridges" (with Brooks & Dunn and Sheryl Crow)	Nominated
2006	Grammy Awards	Best Southern, Country, or Bluegrass Gospel Album	Rock of Ages... Hymns and Faith (with Amy Grant)	Won
2006	Grammy Awards	Best Country Collaboration with Vocals	"Building Bridges" (with Brooks & Dunn and Sheryl Crow)	Nominated
2007	Academy of Country Music	Vocal Event of the Year	"What You Give Away" (with Sheryl Crow)	Nominated
2007	Country Music Association	Album of the Year	These Days	Nominated
2007	Country Music Association	Musical Event of the Year	"The Reason Why" (with Alison Krauss)	Nominated
2007	Grammy Awards	Best Male Country Vocal Performance	"The Reason Why"	Won
2008	Grammy Awards	Best Country Album	These Days	Won
2008	Grammy Awards	Album of the Year	These Days	Nominated
2009	Grammy Awards	Best Country Instrumental Performance	"Cluster Pluck" (among Brad Paisley, James Burton, Albert Lee, John Jorgenson, Brent Mason, Redd Volkaert, and Steve Wariner)	Won
2011	Academy of Country Music	Song of the Year	"Threaten Me with Heaven"	Nominated
2011	Academy of Country Music	Career Achievement Award	—N/a	Won
2012	Academy of Country Music	Vocal Event of the Year	"Don't Rush" (with Kelly Clarkson)	Nominated
2012	Grammy Awards	Best Country Song	"Threaten Me with Heaven"	Won
2013	Country Music Association	Musical Event of the Year	"Don't Rush" (with Kelly Clarkson)	Nominated
2014	Country Music Association	Musical Event of the Year	Bakersfield (with Paul Franklin)	Nominated
2014	Grammy Awards	Best Country Duo/Group Performance	"Don't Rush" (with Kelly Clarkson)	Nominated
2016	Academy of Country Music	Video of the Year	"Forever Country" (among Artists of Then, Now, and Forever)	Won
2016	Academy of Country Music	Vocal Event of the Year	"Forever Country" (among Artists of Then, Now, and Forever)	Nominated
2017	Academy of Country Music	Vocal Event of the Year	"Dear Hate" (with Maren Morris)	Nominated
2017	Grammy Awards	Best American Roots Song	"Kid Sister" (among The Time Jumpers)	Won
2017	Grammy Awards	Best Americana Album	Kid Sister (among The Time Jumpers)	Nominated
2018	Country Music Association	Musical Event of the Year	"Dear Hate" (with Maren Morris)	Nominated
2019	Grammy Awards	Best Country Duo/Group Performance	"Dear Hate" (with Maren Morris)	Nominated
2020	Grammy Awards	Best American Roots Song	"I Don't Wanna Ride the Rails No More"	Won
2021	Grammy Awards	Best Country Solo Performance	"When My Amy Prays"	Won
2024	Grammy Awards	Best Country Duo/Group Performance	"Kissing Your Picture (Is So Cold)" (with Paul Franklin)	Nominated
2025	Country Music Association	Willie Nelson Lifetime Achievement Award	—N/a	Won

== See also ==
- Vince Gill discography
- Eagles (band)
- The Time Jumpers
- The Notorious Cherry Bombs
