= Jeff White (musician) =

American singer-songwriter (born 1957)

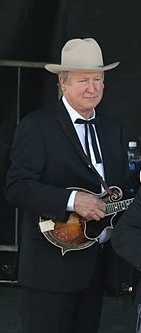
- Jeff White with Earls of Leicester performing at MerleFest in 2015

Background information
- Born: August 2, 1957 (age 69); Syracuse, New York
- Origin: Nashville, Tennessee, United States
- Genres: Bluegrass, Country, Folk
- Occupations: Singer, musician, songwriter, record producer, sound mixer
- Instruments: Guitar; Mandolin
- Years active: 1979–present
- Label: Rounder
- Formerly of: The Chieftains, The Travelin' McCourys, The Earls Of Leicester, Union Station

Jeff White (born August 2, 1957) is an American bluegrass guitarist/mandolinist, songwriter, record producer and sound mixer. Jeff White has performed and produced albums with many artists including: Alison Krauss, Vince Gill, The Chieftains, Lyle Lovett, Tim O'Brien, The Travelin' McCourys, Michael Cleveland and The Earls Of Leicester. White won the 57th Annual Grammy Awards, for Best Bluegrass Album with The Earls of Leicester. One of Jeff's key mentors is award-winning fiddler Michael Cleveland. Jeff and Michael have earned four International Bluegrass Music Awards for Instrumental Recorded Performance of the Year. Jeff produced several of Michael Cleveland's albums. Jeff has toured with legendary banjo player Earl Scruggs. He has produced and released three solo albums: in 1996 The White Album, in 1999 The Broken Road and in 2016 Right Beside You.

Terrific musicianship, top-quality production, and astounding song selection – Right Beside You ought to be nominated for Recorded Event of 2016. Traditional bluegrass remains safe in these hands. Dick Bowden with Bluegrass Today.

== Biography ==
Jeff White was born in Syracuse, New York; at 13 his family moved to North Manchester, Indiana. Jeff's first interest in bluegrass and country music came from seeing the Hee Haw television show that started in 1971. Jeff started to play guitar in high school and joined the high school bluegrass band, the "Suburban Grass". The band played at schools, coffeehouses and then local bars. In college Jeff discovered his love for bluegrass from a dorm mate that played mandolin. Jeff's dorm mate introduced Jeff to Doc Watson, a pioneer of bluegrass music. Jeff studied Dan Crary, Norman Blake, Don Reno, Bill Monroe, Lester Flatt, Earl Scruggs, Foggy Mountain Boys and The Stanley Brothers. After listening to and learning from the classics, Jeff studied the new bluegrass artists such as Sam Bush and JD Crowe. The next band Jeff joined was The Johnsons. Jeff White and The Johnsons came in 1st place in the Best Bluegrass Band in America contest, put on by KFC in Louisville, Kentucky in 1979. Winning the contest earned them a free recording session in RCA's Nashville studio on Music Row. Tom Collins, an album producer with Real Music City Records, helped them make two singles. In 1981 Jeff White and The Johnsons where named the Best New Bluegrass Band. The Johnsons Band was made up of: Dave Johnson, Dan Anderson, Melody Johnson and Jeff White. White departed the group and returned to Indiana to attend graduate school. But, Jeff returned to bluegrass and moved to Beanblossom, Indiana, there he joined up with a new and upcoming bluegrass fiddler Alison Krauss. In 1987, Jeff join Alison Krauss band the Union Station. Union Station recorded two albums while he was a member: in 1989 Two Highways and in 1990 I've Got That Old Feeling. A seaside resort in Japan wanted a bluegrass music band, so Jeff joined other bluegrass artists: Scott Vestal, Jeff Autry, Dave Peters, and Gena Britt in 1991 and play for a year. Jeff moved to Nashville in 1992, he played bluegrass at the Station Inn with Tim O'Brien. Jeff broke into professional music when Vince Gill took Jeff on the road with George Jones and Conway Twitty. Vince Gill had Jeff sing When I Call Your Name at the Grand Ole Opry. Vince Gill got Jeff a job playing with Lyle Lovett. Jeff's next job was playing with the traditional Irish band formed in Dublin The Chieftains. Looking to cross Celtic music with bluegrass and country, Paddy Moloney looked to Jeff to help with the new sound. Jeff toured, performed and helped produce the 2002 The Chieftains album Down the Old Plank Road: The Nashville Sessions and in 2003 Further Down the Old Plank Road. Jeff's next project was working with bluegrass fiddle player Michael Cleveland on his albums. Jeff is also a songwriter and has written songs for The Del McCoury Band, Alison Krauss, Dan Tyminski, Dale Ann Bradley, Stringdusters and Dan Tyminski. Jeff sometimes plays guitar with the Nashville bluegrass band The Travelin' McCourys. Jeff currently plays mandolin for The Earls of Leicester, a band that plays tribute to Flatt and Scruggs. Jeff is married to country music fiddler, guitarist, singer and songwriter, Laura Weber White. Jeff and Laura live in Nashville and were married on March 12, 2017.

== Discography ==
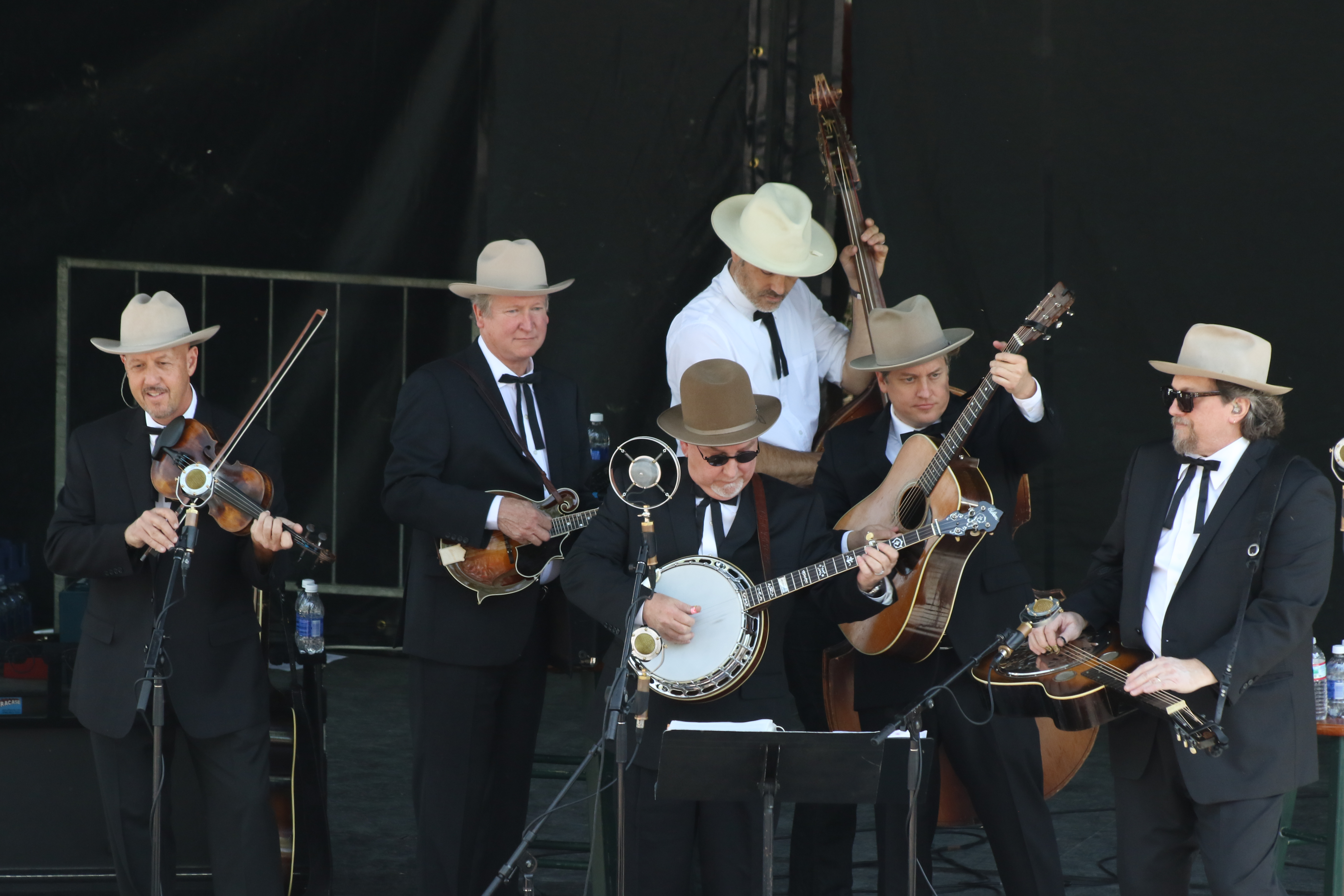
Earls of Leicester performing at MerleFest in 2015

Jeff White's discography:

=== Albums ===
Solo albums

Year	Album	Note
1996	The White Album	
1999	The Broken Road	
2016	Right Beside You	

Albums

- Albums Jeff has performed on and/or helped produce:

Year	Album	Artist	Note
1987	Too Late to Cry	Alison Krauss & Union Station	Guitar
1989	Two Highways	Alison Krauss & Union Station	Guitar, vocals, Grammy Nominated
1990	Bluegrass Class of 1990	Various Artist	Guitar, vocals
1990	Breathe the Moonlight	Kimberly M'Carver	Guitar, vocals
1990	I've Got That Old Feeling	Alison Krauss & Union Station	Guitar, vocals, Grammy Awards of 1991 won Best Bluegrass Recording.
1992	Son of Rounder Banjo	Various Artist	Guitar, vocals
1993	On a Roll	Pete Wernick	Guitar, vocals
1994	Inherited Road	Kimberly M'Carver	Guitar, vocals
1994	When Love Finds You	Vince Gill	Vocals
1995	In the Falling Dark	David Mallett	Vocals
1995	All of This Love	Pam Tillis	Vocals
1995	Appalachian Stomp: Bluegrass Classics	Various Artist	Vocals
1995	Moonlighter	Claire Lynch	Guitar, vocals
1995	Now That I've Found You: A Collection	Alison Krauss	Guitar, vocals
1995	Top of the Hill Bluegrass	Various Artist	Guitar, vocals
1996	High Lonesome Sound	Vince Gill	Guitar, vocals
1996	Sisters	Beth & April Stevens	Guitar
1996	Sweet Harmony	The Whitstein Brothers	Guitar
1996	The Cold Hard Facts	Del McCoury Band	Composer
1996	Trouble with the Truth	Patty Loveless	Vocals
1997	Live in Indianapolis	Gospel Music Workshop of America	Bass Guitar
1997	So Long So Wrong	Alison Krauss & Union Station	Composer
1997	Songs of the Louvin Brothers	Various Artist	Guitar
1997	Steel Rails: Classic Railroad Songs, Vol. 1	Various Artist	Vocals
1997	The Long Road	Pam Gadd	Guitar
1998	A Tribute to Tradition	Various Artist	Guitar
1998	Brother Jukebox	Paul Craft	Guitar
1998	Long Way Home	Amy Gallatin	Vocals
1998	The Key	Vince Gill	Vocals
2000	Sad Songs & Waltzes	Keith Whitley	Guitar
2000	Carry Me Across the Mountain	Dan Tyminski	Composer
2000	Dead Grass Feat: Vassar Clements	Dead Grass	Vocals
2000	Doobie Shea Essential Sampler	Various Artist	Composer
2000	Let's Make Sure We Kiss Goodbye	Vince Gill	Vocals
2000	Ready to Go	Bryan Sutton	Composer
2000	The Chain Gang	Jimmy Bowen & Santa Fe	Composer
2001	Blue Trail of Sorrow: 16 Top Bluegrass Gems	Various Artists	Composer
2001	Cool Blue Rocks: Rock 'N' Roll in the Bluegrass Tradition	Various Artists	Vocals
2001	Mountain Soul	Patty Loveless	Vocals
2001	O Sister! The Women's Bluegrass Collection	Various Artists	Guitar
2001	Songcatcher	Various Artists; Original Soundtrack	Guitar, vocals
2001	Two Journeys	Tim O'Brien	Vocals
2002	Bluegrass Greats	Various Artists	Producer, vocals, guitar, composer
2002	Delayed but Not Denied	The Bonner Brothers	Engineer, Audio Engineer, Composer
2002	Down the Old Plank Road: The Nashville Sessions	The Chieftains	Engineer, vocals, guitar, vocals Producer, Grammy nominated
2002	O Sister 2: A Women's Bluegrass Collection	Various Artists	Guitar
2002	Second Son	Jim Hurst	Vocals
2002	The Angels Are Singing: A Women's Bluegrass Gospel Collection	Various Artists	Vocals
2002	The Singer-Songwriter Collection	Various Artists	Vocals
2002	Flame Keeper	Michael Cleveland	Producer, mixer, vocals
2003	Blue Ridge Mountain Mandolin	Various Artists	Guitar
2003	Bluegrass Today	Various Artists	Producer, mixer, vocals
2003	Chartbuster Karaoke: Bluegrass, Vol. 16	Various Artists	Composer
2003	Comfort of Her Wings	Charley Pride	Guitar
2003	Further Down the Old Plank Road	The Chieftains	Vocals, Guitar, Mandolin, Associate Producer
2003	Love Goes On	Andrea Zonn	Vocals
2003	Midnight Call	Don Rigsby	Guitar
2003	Next Big Thing	Vince Gill	Vocals
2003	White Dove: The Bluegrass Gospel Collection	Various Artists	Vocals
2004	Bluegrass Number 1's	Various Artists	Vocals
2004	High Lonesome and Blue	Del McCoury	Composer
2004	Live - The Bonner Brothers	The Bonner Brothers	Composer
2004	Emily Watson EP	Human Hands	Vocals
2004	Melonie Cannon	Melonie Cannon	Vocals
2005	Georgia Hard	Robbie Fulks	Guitar, vocals
2005	Live from Dublin: A Tribute to Derek Bell	The Chieftains	Guitar
2005	Fired Up	Michael Cleveland	Mixer, producer
2005	New Standards for Flatpicking Guitar	Various Artists	Composer, Artist
2005	Catch Tomorrow	Dale Ann Bradley	Guitar, Vocal Harmony
2006	Day in the Country	Butch Baldassari	Guitar
2006	Let Er Go Boys	Michael Cleveland	Mixer, producer, vocals
2006	The Essential Chieftains	The Chieftains	Guitar
2006	These Days	Vince Gill	Guitar, Vocal
2007	A Hundred Miles or More: A Collection	Alison Krauss	Guitar
2007	Giant Bear	Giant Bear	Guitar
2007	It's Not Big It's Large	Lyle Lovett	Vocals
2007	The Slow Transmission	The Swivel Chairs	Audio Production
2008	The Infamous Stringdusters	The Infamous Stringdusters	Composer
2009	By Request	Del McCoury	Composer
2009	I am Stranger	Jeremy Garrett	Composer
2009	Celebrating 50 Years of Del McCoury	Del McCoury	Composer
2009	Way Up on a Mountain '	Spring Creek	Audio Production
2011	Guitar Slinger	Vince Gill	Vocals
2011	Somewhere South of Crazy	Dale Ann Bradley	Composer
2011	Life Goes On: Musicians Against Childhood Cancer	Various Artists	Composer
2013	Oak Island	Nightlands	Engineer
2013	Playlist: The Very Best of Patty Loveless	Patty Loveless	Associate Producer
2013	The King's Gift '	Trace Adkins	Guitar
2015	The Blade	Ashley Monroe	Vocals
2015	Pocket Full of Keys	Dale Ann Bradley	Vocals
2015	Valley of the Snake	Ruby the Hatchet	Lap Steel Guitar
2016	Full Circle	Loretta Lynn	Vocals, Guitar
2016	Rattle & Roar	The Earls of Leicester	Vocals, Mandolin, Group Member
2016	The Fiddler's Dream	Michael Cleveland	Guitar, vocals, mixer, producer, Grammy Nomination
2018	King of the Road: A Tribute to Roger Mille	Various Artists	Mandolin, Vocal
2018	Tis Ol War	Coco O'Connor	Mandolin, Vocal
2018	Live at the CMA Theater in the Country Music Hall of Fame	The Earls of Leicester	Vocals, Mandolin
2019	Love Hard, Work Hard, Play Hard	Deanie Richardson	Vocals
2019	Tall Fiddler	Michael Cleveland	Producer
2021	Still Woman Enough	Loretta Lynn	Acoustic Guitar
2021	Michael Carpenter And The Banks Brothers – Introducing…	Michael Carpenter	Acoustic Guitar

=== Performances ===
- Selected: Tours, Performances and Events.

Year	Event	Artist	Note
1987–1989	Alison Krauss tours	Alison Krauss	Guitar
1989	Live at the Ryman	Jeff White	Guitar, vocals
1989	IBMA Festival Owensboro, KY	Jeff White	Guitar, vocals
1991	Japan tour	Dave Peters, Randy Howard, James McKinney and Jeff White	Guitar, vocals
1992–2018 (on and off since 1992)	Vince Gill Tour Tours	Vince Gill	Guitar, vocals
1997	Earl Scruggs Band	Earl Scruggs	Guitar, vocals
2002–2005 (on and off since 2002)	The Chieftains Tours	The Chieftains	Mandolin, Vocals
2009	Mountain Soul II tour	Patty Loveless	Guitar, vocals
2010 - 2017	The Travelin' McCourys tour	Travelin' McCourys	Guitar, vocals
October 26, 2014	Country Music Hall of Fame Medallion Ceremony	Various Artist	Guitar, vocals
2000–2019 (on and off since 2000)	Live at the Station Inn, Nashville	Jeff White	Guitar, vocals
2015	Flatpick Guitar Demonstration; Country Music Hall of Fame	Jeff White	Guitar
2016–2019	The Earls Of Leicester Tours	The Earls Of Leicester	Guitar, mandolin, Vocals
2018	2018 Country Music Hall of Fame	Jeff White	Guitar, vocals
2019	Flamekeeper, The Michael Cleveland Story	The Michael Cleveland Story	Guitar, vocals

== Awards ==
Selected Jeff White Awards:

Year	Album	Album Artist	Award
2006	Let Er Go Boys	Michael Cleveland	Instrumental Recorded Performance of the Year, produced by Jeff White & Michael Cleveland
2009	Flamekeeper	Michael Cleveland	Song:Jerusalem Ridge Instrumental Recorded Performance of the Year, produced by Jeff White & Michael Cleveland
2011	Goin' Up Dry Branch	Michael Cleveland	Instrumental Recorded Performance of the Year, produced by Jeff White & Michael Cleveland
2011	Fiddler's Dream	Michael Cleveland	Instrumental Recorded Performance of the Year, produced by Jeff White & Michael Cleveland
2015	Earls of Leicester	Earls of Leicester	57th Annual Grammy Awards, Best Bluegrass Album
2017	Earls of Leicester	Earls of Leicester	28th annual International Bluegrass Music Awards, Entertainer of the Year award

== See also ==
- List of country musicians
- Mandolin playing traditions worldwide
