= San Patricio (album) =

Studio album by The Chieftains, Ry Cooder
- Released: 9 March 2010
- Recorded: Ireland / Mexico
- Genre: World fusion; Celtic; Celtic fusion; Mexican traditional; Norteño; Ranchera; Son; Tejano; Irish traditional
- Length: 61:39
- Label: Hear Music
- Producer: Paddy Moloney, Ry Cooder

The Chieftains, Ry Cooder chronology
The Essential Chieftains (2006)	San Patricio (2010)	Voice of Ages (2012)

Ry Cooder chronology
I, Flathead (2008)	San Patricio (2010)	Pull Up Some Dust and Sit Down (2011)

Professional ratings
Review scores
Source	Rating
Allmusic	link

San Patricio is an album by the Irish musical group, The Chieftains featuring Ry Cooder, released in 2010. It was their first album with Hear Music and the first studio album in over six years since Further Down the Old Plank Road (2003). It tells the story of the San Patricio battalion—a group of mainly Irish immigrant volunteer soldiers who deserted the U.S. Army in 1846 to fight on the Mexican side in the Mexican–American War (1846–1848). The album features collaborations with Moya Brennan, Linda Ronstadt (in what remains her most recent commercial recording), Liam Neeson, Los Cenzontles, Los Tigres del Norte, Lila Downs, Van Dyke Parks, Carlos Núñez, and Chavela Vargas (among others). The album artist is El Moisés.

== Track listing ==
1. "La Iguana" (Traditional, arr. Paddy Moloney, L. Downs) – 3:34 (with Lila Downs)
2. "La Golondrina" (Traditional, arr. P. Moloney, Los Folkloristas) – 3:08 (with Los Folkloristas)
3. "A la Orilla de un Palmar" (Traditional, arr. L. Ronstadt) – 3:32 (with Linda Ronstadt)
4. "Danza de Concheros" (Traditional, arr. P. Moloney, Los Folkloristas) – 1:29 (with Los Folkloristas)
5. "El Chivo" (Traditional, arr. Julian Gonzalez) – 2:05 (with Los Cenzontles)
6. "San Campio" (P. Moloney) – 2:45 (with Carlos Núñez)
7. "The Sands of Mexico" (R. Cooder) – 4:47 (with Ry Cooder)
8. "Sailing to Mexico" (P. Moloney) – 2:00 (with Carlos Núñez)
9. "El Caballo" (Traditional, arr. Los Camperos de Valles, P. Moloney) – 2:40 (with Los Camperos de Valles)
10. "March to Battle (Across the Rio Grande)" (Music: P. Moloney, lyric: Brendan Graham) – 4:10 (with Banda de Gaita de Batallón de San Patricio, Liam Neeson, Los Cenzontles, L.A. Juvenil)
11. "Lullaby for the Dead" (Music: P. Moloney, lyric: Brendan Graham) – 4:36 (with Moya Brennan)
12. "Luz de Luna" (Álvaro Carrillo) – 3:30 (with Chavela Vargas)
13. "Persecución de Villa" (Samuel Margarito Lozano) – 2:55 (with Mariachi Santa Fe de Jesus (Chuy) Guzman)
14. "Canción Mixteca (Intro)" (Jose Lopez Alavez) – 2:54 (with Ry Cooder, Van Dyke Parks)
15. "Canción Mixteca" (Jose Lopez Alavez) – 3:14 (with Los Tigres del Norte)
16. "Ojitos Negros" (Traditional, arr. Eugene Rodriguez) – 2:24 (with Los Cenzontles)
17. "El Relampago" (Traditional, arr. P. Moloney, L. Downs) – 3:15 (with Lila Downs)
18. "El Pájaro Cu" (Traditional, arr. La Negra Graciana, P. Moloney)– 2:35 (with La Negra Graciana)
19. "Finale" (Traditional, arr. P. Moloney) – 5:46 (with Los Cenzontles, Carlos Núñez, Los Folkloristas, Banda de Gaita de Batallón de San Patricio, L.A. Juvenil)

Bonus Disc – DVD (Deluxe Edition only)

1. "The Making of San Patricio"
2. "La Iguana" (with Lila Downs)
3. "Canción Mixteca" (with Los Tigres del Norte)
4. "Luz de Luna" (with Chavela Vargas)

== Personnel ==
in alphabetical order

- Olga Alanis – percussion
- Juan Carlos Allende – guitar
- Sergio Alonso – harp
- Pancho Alvarez – bouzouki
- Stephen Armstrong – assistant engineer
- Hugo Arroyo – tuba, vocals, guitarron, quijada
- Ersi Arvizu – vocals
- Jose Avila – percussion
- Marisa Bautista – vocals
- Moya Brennan – vocals
- Jorge López Calderón – drums (snare)
- Rene Camacho – bass, bass (upright)
- Edmar Castaneda – harp, cuatro
- Gabriel Castañón – assistant engineer
- Paul Cohen – vocals
- Larissa Collins – art direction, package design
- Kevin Conneff – bodhrán, lilting
- Ry Cooder – guitar, piano, composer, timbales, vocals, producer, laud
- Raúl Cuellar – violin
- Robert Curto – accordion
- Lila Downs – vocals, arranger, step dancing
- Ernesto Villalobos – fiddle, jarana, vocals
- Celso Duarte – fiddle, harp, vocals
- Mary Farquharson – coordination, research
- Raúl Durrand Flores – assistant engineer
- Sofia Fojas – violin
- Arturo Gallardo – clarinet
- Julian Gonzalez – violin, arranger
- Bernie Grundman – mastering
- Jesus "Chuy" Guzman – violin
- Carlos Henderson – bass
- Camilo Ramirez Hernandez – violin
- Eduardo Hernández – bass (electric), vocals, bass (acoustic)
- Hernán Hernández – bass (electric), vocals
- Hugo Hernandez – drums (bass)
- Jorgé Hernández – accordion, vocals
- Luis Hernández – accordion, vocals, bajo sexto
- Marcos Hernandez – vocals, huapanguera
- Ubaldo Hernandez – trumpet
- Juancho Herrera – guitar, vocals
- Don Hoffman – engineer
- Daniel García Hughes – drums (snare)
- Juan Jimenez – guitarron
- Jimmy Cuellar – violin
- Guadalupe Jolicoeur – coordination, art direction, research
- Seán Keane – fiddle
- Oscar Lara – drums
- Jeffrey Lesser – engineer
- Germán López – vihuela
- Steve Macklam – art direction
- Mariachi Santa Fe De Jesus (Chuy) Guzman – vocals
- Tríona Marshall – harp
- Neil Martin – cello
- Brian Masterson – engineer, mixing
- Bart Migal – assistant engineer, associate engineer
- Matt Molloy – flute
- Paddy Moloney – arranger, composer, producer, liner notes, uilleann pipes, tin whistle, mixing, tin cans
- Rogelio Navarrate – clarinet
- Liam Neeson – narrator
- Niamh Ní Charra – concertina
- Adrian Nieto – mandolin, percussion
- Carlos Núñez – gaita, low whistle
- Xurxo Nunez – drums, guitar (electric), engineer
- Felipe Ochoa – vocals, requinto
- Marco Ochoa – vocals, jarana
- Van Dyke Parks – piano, accordion
- Miguel Pena – guitar
- Jon Pilatzke – fiddle, step dancing
- Martin Pradler – engineer
- Mike Riley – assistant engineer
- Alberto J. Rodríguez – assistant engineer
- Eugene Rodriguez – vihuela, arranger
- Gabriela Rodriguez – Percussion
- Javier Rodriguez – trumpet
- Juan Rodríguez – violin
- Luciana Rodriguez – vocals
- Albert J. Roman – design assistant
- Linda Ronstadt – vocals, arranger
- Yayo Serka – cajon
- Graciana Silva – harp, vocals
- Gregorio Solano – vocals, jarana
- Samuel Torres – conga, maracas, cajon
- Fabiola Truijillo – vocals
- Omar Valdez – percussion
- Chavela Vargas – vocals
- Efrén Vargas – mandolin, percussion
- Rodolfo Vazquez – engineer, field recording

== Charts ==
=== Weekly charts ===
Chart (2010)	Peak position
Belgian Albums (Ultratop Flanders)	48
Dutch Albums (Album Top 100)	57
Italian Albums (FIMI)	29
Norwegian Albums (VG-lista)	30
Spanish Albums (PROMUSICAE)	42
US Billboard 200	37
US Top Latin Albums (Billboard)	1
US Regional Mexican Albums (Billboard)	1
US World Albums (Billboard)	1

=== Year-end charts ===
Chart (2010)	Position
US Top Latin Albums (Billboard)	12

== See also ==
- List of number-one Billboard Latin Albums from the 2010s
