= Strong Heart =

Strong Heart may refer to:

- Strong Heart (album), a 2000 album by Patty Loveless
- Strong Heart (Mai Kuraki song)
- Strong Heart (T.G. Sheppard song)
- Strong Heart (TV series), a South Korean talk show

== See also ==
- Strongheart, male German Shepherd and early canine star of films
