= List of Top Country Albums number ones of 1998 =

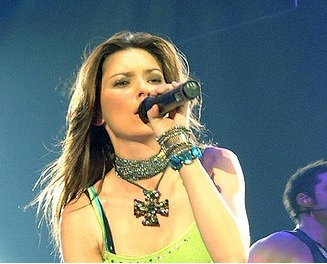
Shania Twain spent 19 weeks at number one in 1998 with Come On Over, which had first reached the top spot late the previous year. The album would ultimately spend a record-breaking 50 weeks in the top spot.

Top Country Albums is a chart that ranks the top-performing country music albums in the United States, published by Billboard. In 1998, nine different albums topped the chart, based on electronic point of sale data provided by SoundScan Inc.

In the issue of Billboard dated January 3, Garth Brooks was at number one with Sevens, the album's fourth week in the top spot. Sevens held the peak position for the first five weeks of the year and returned to number one for five further weeks. Later in the year Brooks achieved two further number ones. In May he topped the chart with The Limited Series, a box set consisting of re-issues of six of his previous albums, five of which had reached number one in their own right. In December he returned to the top spot with the live recording Double Live, which was at number one for the final four weeks of the year. Having been certified more than 20 times platinum by the Recording Industry Association of America, Double Live is the biggest-selling live album of all time in the United States; it was the singer's ninth chart-topping album of the 1990s, a decade in which he experienced a level of mainstream popularity and success unprecedented for a country artist.

Brooks's total of 18 weeks at number one with his three chart-toppers was exceeded by a single week by Canadian singer Shania Twain, who spent 19 non-consecutive weeks atop the chart with her album Come On Over, which had first reached number one late the previous year. The album would eventually spend a total of 50 weeks at number one, making it the longest-running chart-topper in the history of the Top Country Albums listing. In 2000, it was recognized by the Recording Industry Association of America as the highest-selling album of all time by a female artist, as well as the biggest-selling country album. In August, Vince Gill, who had first entered the Top Country Albums chart in 1984, gained his first number one with The Key, which spent a single week in the top spot. He is one of four acts to top the chart in 1998 who are members of the Country Music Hall of Fame, along with Brooks, George Strait and Alan Jackson.

== Chart history ==
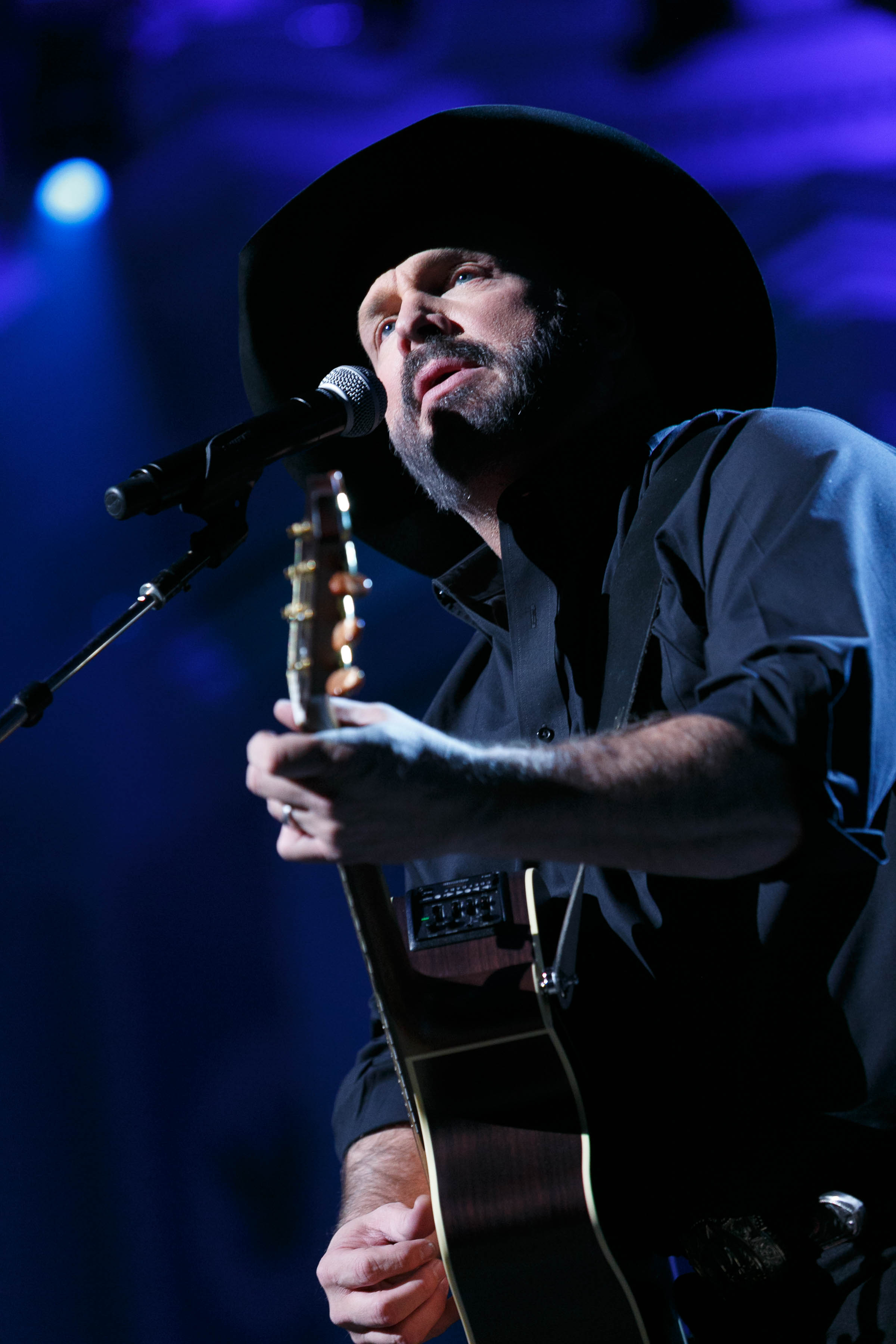
Garth Brooks had three number ones in 1998.

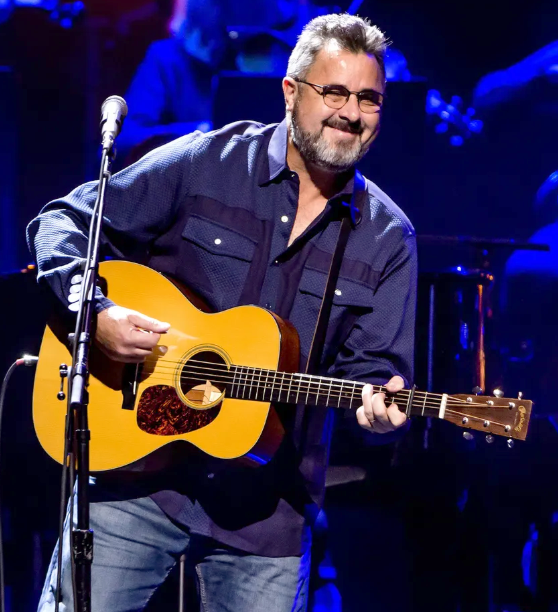
The Key was the first number one for Vince Gill.

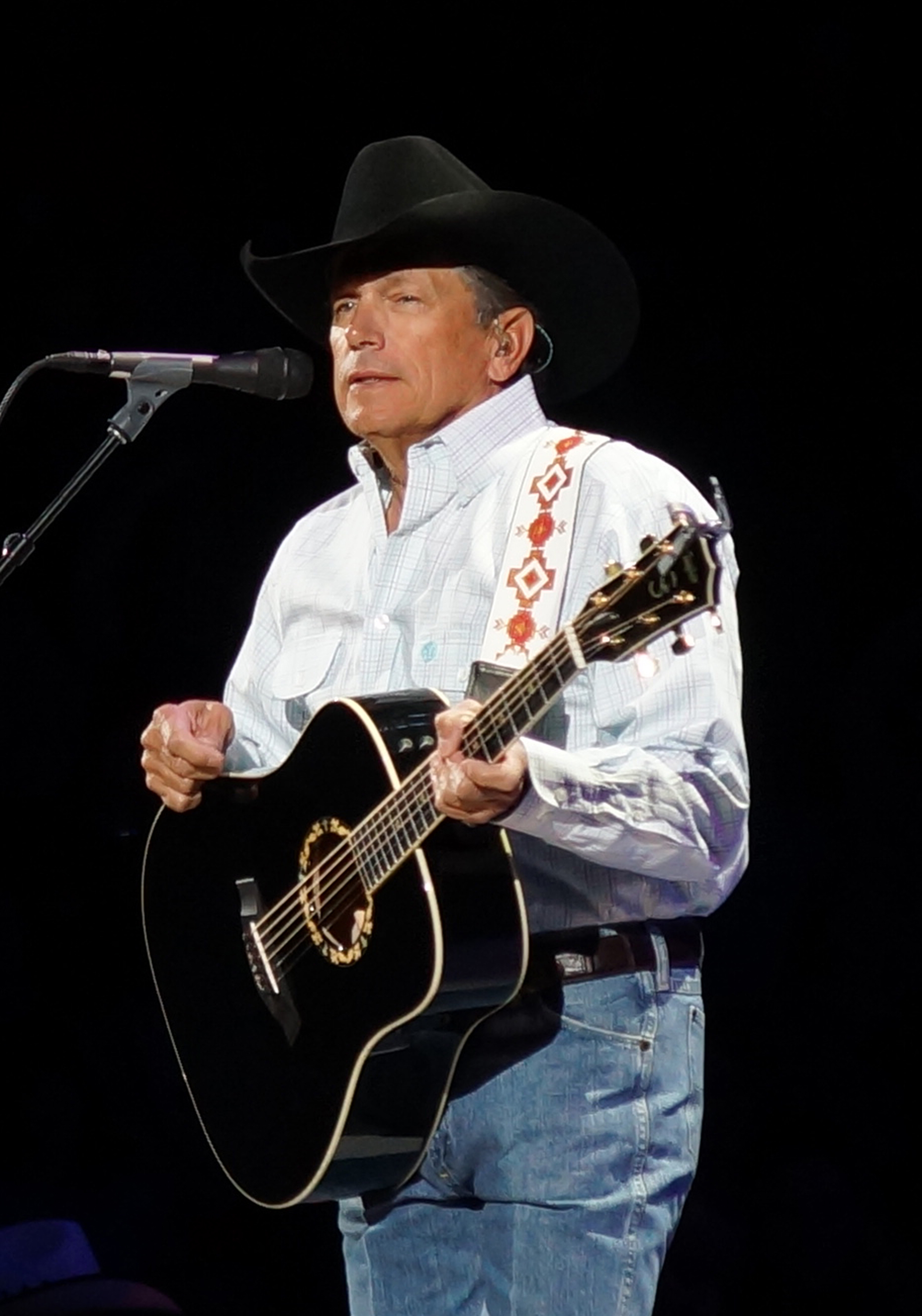
George Strait reached number one with One Step at a Time.

Issue date	Title	Artist(s)	Ref.
January 3	Sevens	Garth Brooks	
January 10	Sevens	Garth Brooks	
January 17	Sevens	Garth Brooks	
January 24	Sevens	Garth Brooks	
January 31	Sevens	Garth Brooks	
February 7	You Light Up My Life: Inspirational Songs	LeAnn Rimes	
February 14	Come On Over	Shania Twain	
February 21	Come On Over	Shania Twain	
February 28	Sevens	Garth Brooks	
March 7	Sevens	Garth Brooks	
March 14	Come On Over	Shania Twain	
March 21	Sevens	Garth Brooks	
March 28	Sevens	Garth Brooks	
April 4	Sevens	Garth Brooks	
April 11	Come On Over	Shania Twain	
April 18	Come On Over	Shania Twain	
April 25	Come On Over	Shania Twain	
May 2	Come On Over	Shania Twain	
May 9	One Step at a Time	George Strait	
May 16	One Step at a Time	George Strait	
May 23	The Limited Series	Garth Brooks	
May 30	The Limited Series	Garth Brooks	
June 6	The Limited Series	Garth Brooks	
June 13	The Limited Series	Garth Brooks	
June 20	Hope Floats	Soundtrack	
June 27	Hope Floats	Soundtrack	
July 4	Hope Floats	Soundtrack	
July 11	Hope Floats	Soundtrack	
July 18	Hope Floats	Soundtrack	
July 25	Hope Floats	Soundtrack	
August 1	Hope Floats	Soundtrack	
August 8	Hope Floats	Soundtrack	
August 15	Hope Floats	Soundtrack	
August 22	Come On Over	Shania Twain	
August 29	The Key	Vince Gill	
September 5	Come On Over	Shania Twain	
September 12	Come On Over	Shania Twain	
September 19	High Mileage	Alan Jackson	
September 26	High Mileage	Alan Jackson	
October 3	Come On Over	Shania Twain	
October 10	Come On Over	Shania Twain	
October 17	Come On Over	Shania Twain	
October 24	Come On Over	Shania Twain	
October 31	Come On Over	Shania Twain	
November 7	Come On Over	Shania Twain	
November 14	Come On Over	Shania Twain	
November 21	Come On Over	Shania Twain	
November 28	Come On Over	Shania Twain	
December 5	Double Live	Garth Brooks	
December 12	Double Live	Garth Brooks	
December 19	Double Live	Garth Brooks	
December 26	Double Live	Garth Brooks	
