= You and You Alone =

You and You Alone may refer to:

- You and You Alone (album), by Randy Travis
- "You and You Alone" (song), by Vince Gill
