= Classics (Patty Loveless album) =

Greatest hits album by Patty Loveless
- Released: March 23, 1999
- Recorded: 1992–1998
- Genre: Country
- Label: Epic
- Producer: Emory Gordy Jr.

Patty Loveless chronology
Long Stretch of Lonesome (1997)	Classics (1999)	Strong Heart (2000)

Singles from Classics
- 1. "Can't Get Enough" Released: January 1999; 2. "My Kind of Woman/My Kind of Man" Released: May 1999

Professional ratings
Review scores
Source	Rating
About.com	link
Allmusic	link
Entertainment Weekly	A link
PopMatters	link
Robert Christgau	link

Classics is the second compilation album by American country music singer Patty Loveless, released on March 23, 1999.

The album includes two new tracks: "Can't Get Enough," which was a #21 Billboard Top Country Single, and "I Just Wanna Be Loved by You." Also included is a duet with Vince Gill, "My Kind of Woman, My Kind of Man," a #27 hit, which first appeared on Gill's 1998 album The Key. The rest of the album features her Epic Records hits: three songs from Only What I Feel, three songs from When Fallen Angels Fly, two songs from The Trouble with the Truth, and one from Long Stretch of Lonesome, the George Jones-backed "You Don't Seem to Miss Me." The album went on to be certified Gold for shipments of over 500,000 copies in the US and was Loveless' last album to receive a certification.

== Track listing ==
No.	Title	Writer(s)	Length
1.	"Can't Get Enough"	Blair Daly, Will Rambeaux, Kent Blazy	2:55
2.	"You Can Feel Bad"	Matraca Berg, Tim Krekel	3:20
3.	"Lonely Too Long"	Mike Lawler, Bill Rice, Sharon Vaughn	4:38
4.	"I Just Wanna Be Loved by You"	Kostas, Emory Gordy Jr.	3:38
5.	"You Don't Even Know Who I Am"	Gretchen Peters	3:59
6.	"Here I Am"	Tony Arata	2:59
7.	"You Don't Seem to Miss Me"	Jim Lauderdale	4:00
8.	"Nothin' but the Wheel"	John Scott Sherrill	3:57
9.	"My Kind of Woman, My Kind of Man" (duet with Vince Gill)	Vince Gill	3:54
10.	"Blame It on Your Heart"	Harlan Howard, Kostas	3:34
11.	"I Try to Think About Elvis"	Gary Burr	2:50
12.	"How Can I Help You Say Goodbye"	Burton Banks Collins, Karen Taylor-Good	5:01

== Personnel on tracks 1 and 4 ==
Adapted from liner notes.

- Dan Dugmore – pedal steel guitar (track 4)
- Stuart Duncan – fiddle
- Paul Franklin – pedal steel guitar
- Steve Gibson – electric guitar
- Emory Gordy Jr. – bass guitar
- Owen Hale – drums
- John Barlow Jarvis – Hammond B-3 organ
- Kostas – background vocals (track 4)
- Patty Loveless – lead vocals
- Carmella Ramsey – background vocals
- Biff Watson – acoustic guitar

== Chart performance ==
=== Weekly charts ===
Chart (1999)	Peak position
US Billboard 200	99
US Top Country Albums (Billboard)	6

=== Year-end charts ===
Chart (1999)	Position
US Top Country Albums (Billboard)	57
