= Last Thing on My Mind =

Last Thing on My Mind or The Last Thing on My Mind may refer to:

- "The Last Thing on My Mind", 1964 song written and first recorded by Tom Paxton, which has been covered by a number of artists
- "Last Thing on My Mind" (Bananarama song), 1992 single by Bananarama made famous by Steps
- "The Last Thing on My Mind" (Patty Loveless song), 2000 single by Patty Loveless
- "Last Thing on My Mind" (Ronan Keating and LeAnn Rimes song), 2004 single by Ronan Keating and LeAnn Rimes
- "The Last Thing on My Mind", a song by the Joy Formidable from the 2016 album Hitch
