= Down the Old Plank Road: The Nashville Sessions =

Studio album by The Chieftains (among others)
- Released: 17 September 2002
- Studio: Sound Emporium (Nashville, Tennessee); Windmill Lane (Dublin, Ireland)
- Genre: Celtic folk; country folk; bluegrass
- Length: 52:28
- Label: RCA Victor
- Producer: Paddy Moloney

The Chieftains (among others) chronology
The Wide World Over (2002)	Down the Old Plank Road: The Nashville Sessions (2002)	Further Down the Old Plank Road (2003)

Down the Old Plank Road: The Nashville Sessions is a 2002 album by The Chieftains. It is a collaboration between the Irish band and many top country music musicians including Ricky Skaggs, Vince Gill, Lyle Lovett, Martina McBride and Alison Krauss.

== Track listing ==
All songs traditional unless indicated.

1. "Down the Old Plank Road" (with John Hiatt, Béla Fleck, Jeff White and Tim O'Brien) - 2:02
2. "Country Blues" (with Buddy & Julie Miller) - 3:13
3. "Sally Goodin" (with Earl Scruggs & Glen Duncan) - 3:15
4. "Dark as a Dungeon" (with Vince Gill and Béla Fleck) (Merle Travis) - 3:25
5. "Cindy" (with Kentucky Thunder & Ricky Skaggs) - 2:38
6. "Molly Bán (Bawn)" (with Alison Krauss and Béla Fleck) - 4:48
7. "Don't Let Your Deal Go Down" (with Lyle Lovett) - 2:41
8. Medley: "Ladies Pantalettes; Belles of Blackville; First House in Connaught" (with Béla Fleck) - 2:18
9. "Whole Heap of Little Horses" (with Patty Griffin) - 2:47
10. "Rain and Snow" (with The Del McCoury Band) - 2:52
11. "I'll Be All Smiles Tonight" (with Martina McBride) - 4:30
12. "Tennessee Stud" (with Jeff White) (Jimmy Driftwood) - 3:08
13. "Katie Dear" (with Gillian Welch & David Rawlings) - 4:31
14. "Give the Fiddler a Dram" (with Béla Fleck) - 10:18

== Personnel ==
The Chieftains

- Paddy Moloney - bagpipes [Uilleann], flute, tin whistle
- Kevin Conneff - bodhrán
- Derek Bell - dulcimer [Tiompán], harp, keyboards
- Seán Keane - fiddle
- Matt Molloy - flute

Guests

- Buddy Miller - vocals (2)
- Julie Miller - vocals (2)
- Vince Gill - vocals (4)
- Ricky Skaggs - vocals, mandolin (5, 14)
- Alison Krauss - vocals, viola, backing vocals (6)
- Lyle Lovett - vocals (7)
- Patty Griffin - vocals (9)
- Del McCoury - vocals, acoustic guitar (10)
- Martina McBride - vocals (11)
- David Rawlings - vocals (13)
- Gillian Welch - vocals (13)
- Shannon Forrest - drums, percussion (1–4, 6, 8–9, 12–14)
- Jeff White - vocals, acoustic guitar (1, 3–9, 11–14)
- Béla Fleck - banjo, violin (1, 4, 6, 8, 14)
- Glenn Worf - double bass (1, 4, 8, 12, 14)
- Tim O'Brien - mandolin, backing vocals (1, 4, 8, 14)
- Matt Rollings - piano (1, 4, 11, 14)
- John Hiatt - backing vocals (1, 14)
- Marc Savoy - accordion (1)
- Jeffrey Lesser - backing vocals (1)
- Bryan Sutton - acoustic guitar, clawhammer banjo, mandolin, octave mandolin (2–3, 6, 9, 11, 13–14)
- Barry Bales - double bass (2–3, 6, 9, 13)
- Earl Scruggs - banjo (3)
- Glen Duncan - fiddle (3)
- Randy Kohrs - resonator guitar [Dobro] (4, 12–14)
- Jim Mills - banjo (5)
- Mark Fain - double bass (5)
- Cody Kilby - acoustic guitar (5)
- Andy Leftwich - fiddle (5)
- Steve Buckingham - mountain dulcimer (6)
- Viktor Krauss - double bass (7)
- James Gilmer - percussion (7)
- John Hagen - cello (7)
- Robbie McCoury - banjo (10)
- Jason Carter - fiddle (10)
- Mike Bub - double bass (10)
- Ronnie McCoury - mandolin (10)
- Stuart Duncan - mandolin (11–12)
- Jeff Taylor - accordion (11)

== Chart performance ==
Chart (2002)	Peak position
U.S. Billboard Top Country Albums	21
U.S. Billboard 200	91
