= The Earls of Leicester =

American bluegrass band

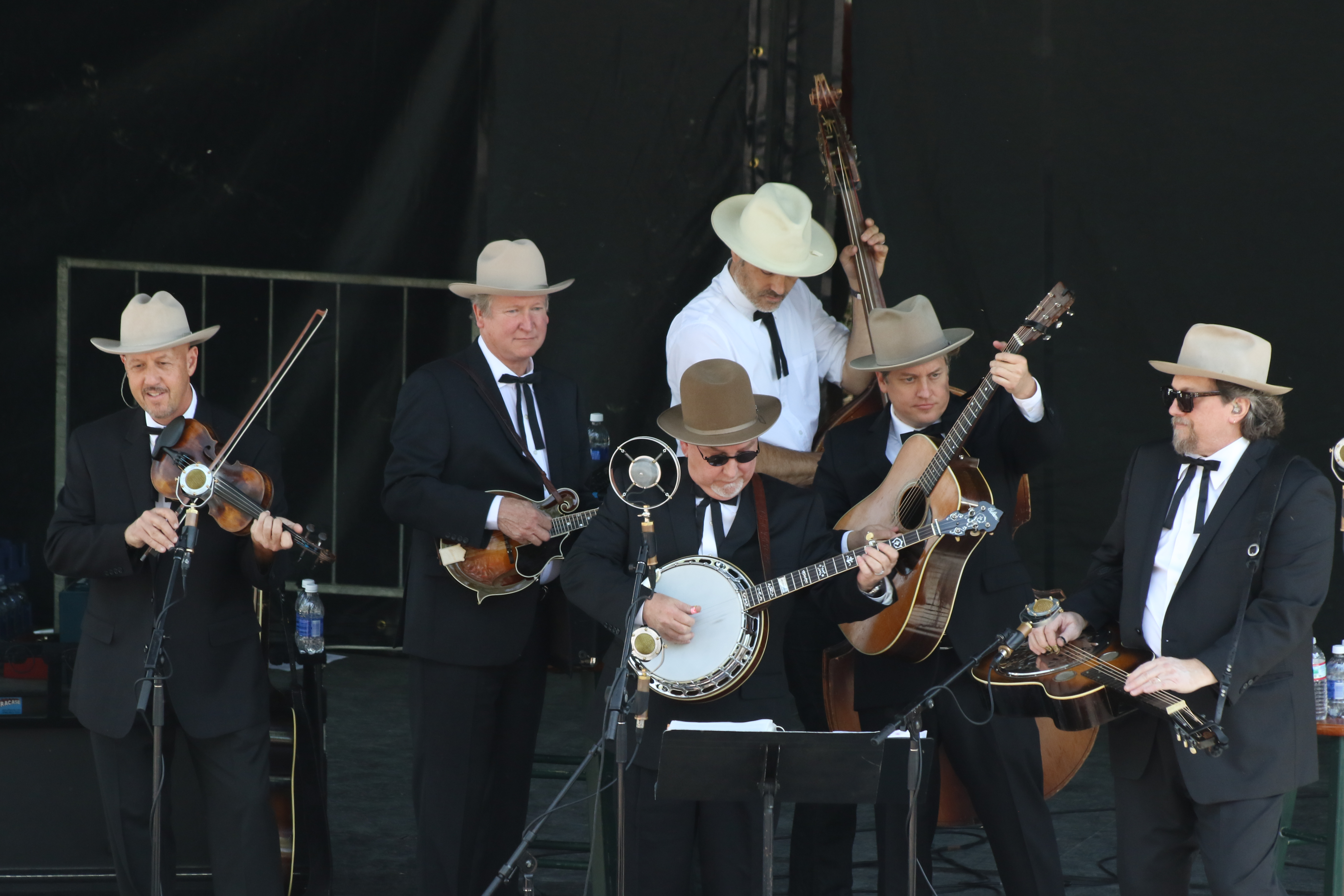
- Performing at MerleFest, 2015

Background information
- Origin: Nashville, Tennessee, U.S.
- Genres: Bluegrass
- Years active: 2013–present
- Labels: Rounder
- Members: Daniel Kimbro; Charlie Cushman; Jerry Douglas; Johnny Warren; Shawn Camp; Jeff White
- Past members: Tim O'Brien; Barry Bales

The Earls of Leicester is an American bluegrass group, assembled by Jerry Douglas in 2013 to present the music of Lester Flatt, Earl Scruggs and their band the Foggy Mountain Boys to a contemporary audience. Their eponymous debut album earned a Grammy Award for Best Bluegrass Album in 2015.

The band's name is a play on words: The English city Leicester is pronounced "Lester", the same as Flatt's first name, and Scruggs' first name is "Earl".

== Members ==
=== Current ===
- Jerry Douglas - Dobro
- Shawn Camp - lead vocals and guitar
- Charlie Cushman - banjo and guitars
- Johnny Warren - vocals and fiddle
- Daniel Kimbro - vocals and bass
- Jeff White - mandolin and vocals

=== Former ===
- Tim O'Brien - mandolin, vocals
- Barry Bales - bass, vocals

== Discography ==
Title	Album details	Peak chart positions			Sales
Title	Album details	US Grass	US	US Heat	Sales
The Earls of Leicester	Release date: September 16, 2014; Label: Rounder Records	1	159	3	US: 17,000
Rattle & Roar	Release date: August 12, 2016; Label: Rounder	–	–	–	
Live at the CMA Theater	Release date: September 28, 2018; Label: Rounder	–	–	–	
"—" denotes a recording that did not chart or was not released in that territory

=== Other appearances ===
Year	Song	Album
2018	"In the Summertime"	King of the Road: A Tribute to Roger Miller

== Awards ==
The Earls and their engineer/mixer, Bil Vorndick, received a Grammy Award in 2014 for Best Bluegrass Album for their album The Earls of Leicester. The band was awarded Album of the year, Gospel recorded performance of the year, instrumental group of the year, and entertainer of the year by the International Bluegrass Music Association in 2015. They were again awarded IBMA Entertainer of the year in 2016 and 2017.
