= A Little More Love (Vince Gill song) =

1997 song by Vince Gill

Single by Vince Gill

from the album High Lonesome Sound
- B-side: "Jenny Dreamed of Trains"
- Released: March 17, 1997
- Genre: Country
- Length: 3:06
- Label: MCA
- Songwriter: Vince Gill
- Producer: Tony Brown

Vince Gill singles chronology
"Pretty Little Adriana" (1997)	"A Little More Love" (1997)	"You and You Alone" (1997)

"A Little More Love" is a song written and recorded by American country music artist Vince Gill. It was released in March 1997 as the fourth single from the album High Lonesome Sound. The song reached number 2 on the Billboard Hot Country Singles & Tracks chart.

== Critical reception ==
Deborah Evans Price, of Billboard magazine reviewed the song favorably, saying that the song contains "feathery vocals", a "buoyant melody", and "tasty guitar playing." She goes on to call it a "springtime hit."

== Music video ==
The music video was directed by John Lloyd Miller and premiered in early 1997.

== Chart performance ==
"A Little More Love" debuted at number 50 on the U.S. Billboard Hot Country Singles & Tracks for the week of March 29, 1997.

Chart (1997)	Peak position
Canada Country Singles (RPM)	6
US Hot Country Songs (Billboard)	2

=== Year-end charts ===
Chart (1997)	Position
Canada Country Tracks (RPM)	64
US Country Songs (Billboard)	13
