= The Wide World Over =

Greatest hits album by The Chieftains
- Released: 5 March 2002
- Recorded: 1985–2000
- Genre: Irish folk music; Celtic
- Length: 71:25
- Label: RCA

The Chieftains chronology
Water from the Well (2000)	The Wide World Over (2002)	Down the Old Plank Road: The Nashville Sessions (2002)

The Wide World Over is a 40th anniversary, greatest hits-like compilation by the Irish musical group The Chieftains. It gathers tracks from The Chieftains in China until Water from the Well, as well as four new releases.

== Songs on the album ==
1 The Chieftains– March Of The King Of Laois / Paddy's Jig / O'Keefes Chattering Magpie (Reels) Arranged By – Paddy Moloney Engineer [Recording] – Brian Masterson Mixed By – Brian Masterson, Paddy Moloney Tap Dance [Dancer] – Jean Butler Written By – Traditional 4:25

2 The Chieftains With Sinéad O'Connor – The Foggy Dew Arranged By – Paddy Moloney Bagpipes [Galician Gaitha] – Carlos Nuñez* Electric Guitar, Mandola [Mandolla], Performer [Floor Slide] – Ry Cooder Engineer [Assistant Mixing] – Mark Guilbeault, Noel Hazen Engineer [Assistant Recording] – Jonathan Mooney, Robert Friedrich Engineer [At Ocean Way, Los Angeles] – Allen Sides Engineer [Recording] – Jeffrey Lesser Mixed By – Allen Sides, Paddy Moloney Vocals – Sinéad O'Connor Written By – Traditional 5:01

3 The Chieftains With The Corrs – I Know My Love Arranged By – Paddy Moloney Engineer [Recording Assistant In Dublin] – Richard McCullough Engineer [Recording Assistant] – Ciarán Cahill, Jonathan Ford Engineer [Recording] – Brian Masterson Mixed By – Brian Masterson, Paddy Moloney Written By – Traditional 3:27

4 The Chieftains With Ricky Skaggs – Cotton-Eyed Joe Arranged By – Paddy Moloney Engineer [Recording] – Warren Peterson Mixed By – Paddy Moloney Vocals, Mandolin, Guitar – Ricky Skaggs Written By – Traditional 2:45

5 The Chieftains With Joni Mitchell – The Magdalene Laundries Arranged By – Paddy Moloney Composed By – Joni Mitchell Engineer [Recording Assistant In Dublin] – Richard McCullough Engineer [Recording Assistant In Los Angeles] – Mike Stotella Engineer [Recording In Dublin] – Brian Masterson Engineer [Recording In Los Angeles] – Jeffrey Lesser Mixed By – Brian Masterson, Paddy Moloney Vocals, Guitar – Joni Mitchell 4:57

6 The Chieftains – Live From Matt Molloy's Pub Arranged By – Matt Molloy Engineer [Recording Assistant] – Kieran Lynch Engineer [Recording] – Brian Masterson Mixed By – Jeffrey Lesser, Paddy Moloney Written By – Traditional 2:21

7 The Chieftains With Van Morrison – Shenandoah Arranged By – Paddy Moloney, Van Morrison Engineer – Brian Masterson Engineer [Recording Assistant] – Ciarán Cahill, Paul Offenbacher Engineer [Recording In Dublin] – Brian Masterson Engineer [Recording In Toronto] – Kevin Doyle Mixed By – Brian Masterson, Paddy Moloney Vocals – Sharon Riley, Faith Chorale*, Van Morrison Written By – Traditional 3:52

8 The Chieftains– The Munster Cloak / An Poc Ar Buile / Ferny Hill-Little Molly Arranged By [Ferny Hill-little Molly (Reels)] – Matt Molloy, Seán Keane* Arranged By [The Munster Cloak / An Poc Ar Buile] – Paddy Moloney Engineer – Brian Masterson Engineer [Assistant] – Kieran Lynch Mixed By – Brian Masterson, Paddy Moloney Written By – Traditional 6:12

9 The Chieftains With Diana Krall & Art Garfunkel– Morning Has Broken Arranged By – Paddy Moloney Arranged By [String Arrangements] – Fiachra Trench Engineer [Recording Aboard The Ocean Explorer] – Danny Cleland Mixed By – Brian Masterson, Paddy Moloney Recorded By [Strings] – Brian Masterson Vocals – Art Garfunkel, Diana Krall Written By – Traditional 2:55

10 The Chieftains– Morning Dew / Women Of Ireland Composed By [Morning Dew] – Paddy Moloney Composed By [Women Of Ireland] – Sean Ó Riada* Mixed By – Brian Masterson, Paddy Moloney Recorded By – Brian Masterson 2:57

11 The Chieftains With Sting – Mo Ghile Mear Arranged By – Paddy Moloney Engineer [Mixing Assistant] – Troy Halderson Engineer [Recording] – Alistair McMillan* Mixed By – Brian Masterson, Paddy Moloney Recorded By – Simon Osborne Vocals, Guitar – Sting Written By – Traditional 3:20

12 The Chieftains With The Belfast Harp Orchestra– Carolan's Concerto Arranged By – Paddy Moloney Mixed By – Brian Masterson, Paddy Moloney Orchestra – The Belfast Harp Orchestra Written By – Traditional 3:02

13 The Chieftains With Linda Ronstadt & Los Lobos– Guadalupe Arranged By – Paddy Moloney Engineer – Jeffrey Lesser Engineer [Assisted By] – Bob Conlon Engineer [San Francisco] – Robert Loftus Jr. Instruments [Mexican String Instruments], Percussion – Los Lobos Mixed By [Original Mix] – Paddy Moloney, Robert Loftus* Vocals – Linda Ronstadt, Los Lobos Written By – Traditional 3:31

14 The Chieftains With Chinese Ensemble– Full Of Joy Arranged By – Paddy Moloney Mixed By – Bill Somerville-Large, Paddy Moloney, Pearse Dunn* Recorded By [Live In Beijing] – Brian Masterson Written By – Traditional 3:24

15 The Chieftains– Here's A Health To The Company Arranged By – Kevin Conneff Mixed By – Brian Masterson, Paddy Moloney Vocals – Kevin Conneff 3:03

16 The Chieftains With Erich Kunzel & The Cincinnati Pops Orchestra* – Chasing The Fox Arranged By – Paddy Moloney Conductor – Erich Kunzel Mixed By – Brian Masterson, Paddy Moloney Mixed By [Erich Kunzel And The Cincinnati Pops Orchestra] – Michael Bishop Orchestra – The Cincinnati Pops Orchestra* Producer – Robert Woods (2) Recorded By [Dublin] – Brian Masterson Recorded By [Erich Kunzel And The Cincinnati Pops Orchestra] – Michael Bishop Written By – Traditional 4:11

17 The Chieftains With Elvis Costello – Long Journey Home (Anthem) Choir – Anúna Composed By – Elvis Costello, Paddy Moloney Engineer – Brian Masterson, Jeffrey Lesser Engineer [Assistant] – Cameron Doyle, Ciarán Cahill, Jonathon Ford* Mixed By – Brian Masterson, Paddy Moloney Vocals – Elvis Costello 3:20

18 The Chieftains With The Rolling Stones– The Rocky Road To Dublin Engineer [Assistant Mixing] – Jason Mauza Engineer [Assistant Recording] – Alistair McMillan* Engineer [Recording] – Chris Kimsey Mixed By – Chris Kimsey, Paddy Moloney Written By – Traditional 4:17

19 The Chieftains With Ziggy Marley– Redemption Song A&R [Direction] – Larry Hamby, Patrick Clifford Bass, Percussion – Don Was Composed By – Bob Marley Engineer [Recording] – Rik Pekkonen Mixed By – Don Was, Rik Pekkonen Producer – Don Was, Paddy Moloney Vocals, Guitar, Percussion – Ziggy Marley

== Charts ==
Chart (2002)	Peak position
Australian Albums (ARIA Charts)	55
