= Live from Dublin: A Tribute to Derek Bell =

Live From Dublin: A Tribute To Derek Bell

Live album by The Chieftains
- Released: 22 February 2005
- Recorded: 2004, Dublin
- Genre: Celtic
- Label: RCA Victor
- Producer: Paddy Moloney

The Chieftains chronology
Further Down the Old Plank Road (2003)	Live From Dublin: A Tribute To Derek Bell (2005)	The Essential Chieftains (2006)

Professional ratings
Review scores
Source	Rating
Allmusic	3.5/5 stars

Live From Dublin: A Tribute To Derek Bell is an album by The Chieftains. The album is a live recording of a concert dedicated to Derek Bell, a former member of the band. The band invited on stage friends of Bell, such as Ronnie Drew, Carlos Núñez, Anúna and Jeff White. It was nominated for the Grammy Awards in 2006 as the Best Traditional Folk Album.

The original release of the CD contained SunnComm's MediaMax content protection system. As the result of a product recall, several class action lawsuits, and intense public criticism of this software, frequently described as malware, Sony BMG has recalled the original release of the CD and customers who purchased the affected discs can receive new, MediaMax-free CDs, information on removing the software from personal computers, and compensation for necessary repairs on affected computers.

== Track listing ==
1. "The Timpán Reel" – 3:12
2. "Opening Medley: Brian Boru's March/Nine Points Of Roguery (reel)/The Magpie - Pretty Girls (reels)" – 5:52
3. "Down the Old Plank Road" – 2:19
4. "Derek's Tune: The Geese And Bright Love" – 3:50
5. "Galician Medley: Never Trust A Man's Love/Mazurka/Guadalupe/Múneura de Jios/Duelling Chanters" – 7:59
6. "Ellen Browne" – 3:02
7. "Medley: Banish Misfortune/Morning Dew/Arkansas Traveller (reel)/Wild Irishman (reel)" – 6:03
8. "Oiche Nollag (Christmas Eve)" – 2:51
9. "Fionnghuala" (Performed by Anúna) – 1:52
10. "Carrickfergus" – 6:02
11. "I'll Tell Me Ma" (Sung by Ronnie Drew) - 2:50
12. "Tá An Choileach Ag Fógairt An Lae (3 Pipes)" - 2:33
13. "Ottawa Valley Dance" - 1:52
14. "Finale" - 12:55
15. "Farewell to Music" - 3:13
