= High Lonesome Sound =

Studio album by Vince Gill
- Released: May 28, 1996
- Studio: Masterfonics, The Tracking Room and Emerald Sound Studios (Nashville, Tennessee)
- Genre: Country
- Length: 42:56
- Label: MCA Nashville
- Producer: Tony Brown

Vince Gill chronology
Souvenirs (1995)	High Lonesome Sound (1996)	The Key (1998)

Singles from High Lonesome Sound
- 1. "High Lonesome Sound" Released: April 1, 1996; 2. "Worlds Apart" Released: July 15, 1996; 3. "Pretty Little Adriana" Released: October 28, 1996; 4. "A Little More Love" Released: March 17, 1997; 5. "You and You Alone" Released: July 7, 1997

Professional ratings
Review scores
Source	Rating
AllMusic	link
Chicago Tribune	link
Entertainment Weekly	B− link
Los Angeles Times	link

High Lonesome Sound is the seventh studio album from American country music artist Vince Gill. It was released in 1996 on MCA Nashville. It features the singles "High Lonesome Sound," "Worlds Apart," "Pretty Little Adriana", "A Little More Love" and "You and You Alone." Two versions of the title track are included. The one at the end of the album was recorded in a more bluegrass orchestration, backed by Alison Krauss & Union Station.

== Track listing ==
All tracks written by Vince Gill, with additional writers noted.

No.	Title	Writer(s)	Length
1.	"One Dance with You"	Reed Nielsen	3:01
2.	"High Lonesome Sound"		3:26
3.	"Pretty Little Adriana"		3:47
4.	"A Little More Love"		3:09
5.	"Down to New Orleans"	Pete Wasner	4:18
6.	"Tell Me Lover"		4:03
7.	"Given More Time"	Don Schlitz	3:58
8.	"You and You Alone"		3:27
9.	"Worlds Apart"	Bob DiPiero	5:43
10.	"Jenny Dreamed of Trains"	Guy Clark	5:20
11.	"High Lonesome Sound" (featuring Alison Krauss & Union Station)		3:06

== Personnel ==
- Vince Gill – vocals, acoustic guitar, gut-string guitar, electric guitar solo, mandolin
- Steve Nathan – acoustic piano, synthesizers, Hammond B3 organ
- Pete Wasner – acoustic piano, electric piano, Hammond B3 organ
- Steuart Smith – acoustic guitar, electric guitar
- Billy Joe Walker Jr. – acoustic guitar, electric guitar
- Jeff White – acoustic guitar (2), harmony vocals (4, 10)
- Dan Tyminski – acoustic guitar (11)
- Ron Block – banjo (2, 11)
- Adam Steffey – mandolin (2, 11)
- John Hughey – steel guitar (2)
- Jerry Douglas – dobro (11)
- Leland Sklar – bass (1–10)
- Barry Bales – bass (11)
- Carlos Vega – drums
- Jeff Guernsey – fiddle (2, 7, 10)
- Bob Bailey – harmony vocals (1, 6, 9)
- Chris Rodriguez – harmony vocals (1, 6, 9)
- Billy Thomas – harmony vocals (1)
- Alison Krauss – harmony vocals (2, 11), fiddle (11)
- Kim Richey – harmony vocals (4)
- Bekka Bramlett – harmony vocals (5, 6)
- Patty Loveless – harmony vocals (7)
- Shelby Lynne – harmony vocals (8)
- Lisa Bevill – harmony vocals (9)
- Kim Fleming – harmony vocals (9)
- Nicole C. Mullen – harmony vocals (9)

== Production ==
- Tony Brown – producer
- Chuck Ainlay – recording, mixing
- Graham Lewis – second engineer
- Denny Purcell – mastering at Georgetown Masters (Nashville, Tennessee)
- Jessie Noble – project coordinator
- Robert Ascroft – art direction, design
- Bill Brunt – art direction, design
- Jim "Señor" McGuire – photography
- Trish Townsend – stylist
- Gina Giglio – hair, make-up
- The Fitzgerald Hartley Co. – management

== Charts ==
Chart (1996)	Peak position
U.S. Billboard Top Country Albums	3
U.S. Billboard 200	24
Canadian RPM Country Albums	5
Canadian RPM Top Albums	43

== Certifications ==
Region	Certification	Certified units/sales
United States (RIAA)	Platinum	1,000,000^{^}
^{^} Shipments figures based on certification alone.
