= My Kind of Woman/My Kind of Man =

Single by Vince Gill and Patty Loveless

from the album The Key and Classics
- B-side: "All Those Years" (Vince Gill)
- Released: May 24, 1999
- Genre: Country
- Length: 3:54
- Label: MCA
- Songwriter: Vince Gill
- Producer: Tony Brown

Vince Gill singles chronology
"Don't Come Cryin' to Me" (1999)	"My Kind of Woman/My Kind of Man" (1999)	"Let's Make Sure We Kiss Goodbye" (2000)

Patty Loveless singles chronology
"Can't Get Enough" (1999)	"My Kind of Woman/My Kind of Man" (1999)	"That's the Kind of Mood I'm In" (2000)

"My Kind of Woman/My Kind of Man" is a song written by and recorded by American country music artist Vince Gill, who recorded it as a duet with ex-labelmate Patty Loveless. It was released in May 1999 as the fourth single from Gill's album The Key and the second single from Loveless' compilation album Classics.

After the release of Loveless' studio album Long Stretch of Lonesome in late 1997, she collaborated with Gill in a series of recording sessions which were produced by Gill and Tony Brown. Two of the recordings were eventually released, "My Kind of Woman, My Kind of Man" along with "Wine, Women And Song". Gill and Loveless debuted the song on The Tonight Show with Jay Leno upon its release in 1999.

The song charted for 20 weeks on the Billboard Hot Country Singles and Tracks chart, reaching #27 during the week of July 31, 1999. It also reached #16 on the Bubbling Under Hot 100 chart. "My Kind of Woman/My Kind of Man" won the Country Music Association's 1999 award for Vocal Event of the Year.

== Chart positions ==
Chart (1999)	Peak position
Canada Country Singles (RPM)	22
US Bubbling Under Hot 100 (Billboard)	16
US Hot Country Songs (Billboard)	27
