= That's the Kind of Mood I'm In =

Single by Patty Loveless

from the album Strong Heart
- B-side: "You Don't Get No More"
- Released: June 10, 2000
- Genre: Country
- Length: 3:31
- Label: Epic
- Songwriters: Rick Giles, Tim Nichols, Gilles Godard
- Producer: Emory Gordy Jr.

Patty Loveless singles chronology
"My Kind of Woman/My Kind of Man" (1999)	"That's the Kind of Mood I'm In" (2000)	"The Last Thing on My Mind" (2000)

"That's the Kind of Mood I'm In" is a song written by Tim Nichols, Rick Giles and Gilles Godard. The song was initially recorded by Canadian artist Amanda Lee and issued in April 2000, peaking at #65 on the RPM Canadian country charts in July. A near-simultaneous cover was recorded by American country music artist Patty Loveless and was released in June 2000 as the first single from her album Strong Heart. This version proved to be the bigger hit.

The song charted for 20 weeks on the Billboard Hot Country Singles and Tracks chart, reaching #13 during the week of 25 November 2000. "That's the Kind of Mood I'm In" was also Loveless' second entry into the Billboard Hot 100, charting for 14 weeks, reaching #71 during the week of November 18, 2000. In Canada, Loveless' version of the song peaked at #38 on the RPM country charts in November.

== Chart positions ==
Chart (2000)	Peak position
Canada Country Singles (RPM)	38 (Note: "That's the Kind of Mood I'm In" had not yet peaked when RPM ceased publication in November 2000.)
US Hot Country Songs (Billboard)	13
US Billboard Hot 100	71

=== Year-end charts ===
Chart (2000)	Position
US Country Songs (Billboard)	59
