= High on Love =

Single by Patty Loveless

from the album Long Stretch of Lonesome
- Released: June 6, 1998
- Genre: Country
- Length: 3:03
- Label: Epic
- Songwriters: Kostas, Jeff Hanna
- Producer: Emory Gordy Jr.

Patty Loveless singles chronology
"To Have You Back Again" (1998)	"High on Love" (1998)	"Like Water into Wine" (1998)

"High on Love" is a song written by Jeff Hanna and Kostas, and recorded by American country music artist Patty Loveless. It was released in June 1998 as the third single from the album Long Stretch of Lonesome. The song reached #20 on the Billboard Hot Country Singles & Tracks chart.

== Chart performance ==
Chart (1998)	Peak position
Canada Country Singles (RPM)	20
US Hot Country Songs (Billboard)	20
