= To Have You Back Again =

Single by Patty Loveless

from the album Long Stretch of Lonesome
- Released: January 31, 1998
- Genre: Country
- Length: 4:35
- Label: Epic
- Songwriters: Annie Roboff, Arnie Roman
- Producer: Emory Gordy Jr.

Patty Loveless singles chronology
"You Don't Seem to Miss Me" (1997)	"To Have You Back Again" (1998)	"High on Love" (1998)

"To Have You Back Again" is a song written by Annie Roboff and Arnie Roman, and recorded by American country music artist Patty Loveless. It was released in January 1998 as the second single from her album Long Stretch of Lonesome.

The song charted for 20 weeks on the Billboard Hot Country Singles and Tracks chart, reaching number 12 during the week of May 9, 1998.

== Chart positions ==
Chart (1998)	Peak position
Canada Country Singles (RPM)	17
US Hot Country Songs (Billboard)	12

=== Year-end charts ===
Chart (1998)	Position
Canada Country Tracks (RPM)	91
US Country Songs (Billboard)	69
