= Can't Get Enough (Patty Loveless song) =

Single by Patty Loveless

from the album Classics
- Released: January 6, 1999
- Genre: Country
- Length: 2:55
- Label: Epic
- Songwriters: Blair Daly, Will Rambeaux, Kent Blazy
- Producer: Emory Gordy Jr.

Patty Loveless singles chronology
"Like Water Into Wine" (1998)	"Can't Get Enough" (1999)	"My Kind of Woman/My Kind of Man" (1999)

"Can't Get Enough" is a song written by Kent Blazy, Will Rambeaux and Blair Daly, and recorded by American country music artist Patty Loveless. It was released in January 1999 as the first single from her compilation album Classics.

The song charted for 20 weeks on the Billboard Hot Country Singles and Tracks chart, reaching number 21 during the week of April 17, 1999. "Can't Get Enough" became Loveless' first entry into the Billboard Hot 100, charting for four weeks, reaching number 96 during the week of April 17, 1999.

== Chart positions ==
Chart (1999)	Peak position
Canada Country Singles (RPM)	8
US Billboard Hot 100	96
US Hot Country Songs (Billboard)	21

=== Year-end charts ===
Chart (1999)	Position
Canada Country Tracks (RPM)	55
