= Let's Make Sure We Kiss Goodbye (song) =

2000 single by Vince Gill

Single by Vince Gill

from the album Let's Make Sure We Kiss Goodbye
- B-side: "Let Her In"
- Released: January 29, 2000
- Genre: Country
- Length: 4:04
- Label: MCA Nashville
- Songwriter: Vince Gill
- Producer: Tony Brown

Vince Gill singles chronology
"My Kind of Woman/My Kind of Man" (1999)	"Let's Make Sure We Kiss Goodbye" (2000)	"Feels Like Love" (2000)

"Let's Make Sure We Kiss Goodbye" is a song written and recorded by American country music artist Vince Gill. It was released in January 2000 as the first single and title track from the album Let's Make Sure We Kiss Goodbye. The song reached #20 on the Billboard Hot Country Singles & Tracks chart.

== Chart performance ==
Chart (2000)	Peak position
Canada Country Singles (RPM)	26
US Bubbling Under Hot 100 (Billboard)	2
US Hot Country Songs (Billboard)	20
