= High Lonesome Sound (song) =

Single by Vince Gill

from the album High Lonesome Sound
- Released: April 1, 1996
- Genre: Country
- Length: 3:26
- Label: MCA 55188
- Songwriter: Vince Gill
- Producer: Tony Brown

Vince Gill singles chronology
"Go Rest High on That Mountain" (1995)	"High Lonesome Sound" (1996)	"Worlds Apart" (1996)

"High Lonesome Sound" is a song written by Peter Rowan and recorded by American country music artist Vince Gill. It was released in April 1996 as the first single and title track from his album High Lonesome Sound. The song reached #12 on the Billboard Hot Country Singles & Tracks chart in June 1996 and #1 on the RPM Country Tracks chart in Canada the following month.

At the 39th Grammy Awards, "High Lonesome Sound" won the award for Best Country Collaboration with Vocals and was nominated for Best Country Song.

An alternate version of the song was recorded in a more bluegrass orchestration and backed by Alison Krauss & Union Station.

== Critical reception ==
Deborah Evans Price, of Billboard magazine reviewed the song favorably, saying that the "vibrant and bluegrassy sound of the instruments combined with Gill's stellar vocals create a winning combination."

== Chart performance ==
"High Lonesome Sound" debuted at number 50 on the U.S. Billboard Hot Country Singles & Tracks for the week of April 13, 1996

Chart (1996)	Peak position
Canada Country Singles (RPM)	1
US Hot Country Songs (Billboard)	12

=== Year-end charts ===
Chart (1996)	Position
Canada Country Tracks (RPM)	16
