= You Don't Seem to Miss Me =

1997 Patty Loveless song

Single by Patty Loveless

from the album Long Stretch of Lonesome
- B-side: "Where Are You Boy"
- Released: September 20, 1997
- Genre: Country
- Length: 4:07
- Label: Epic
- Songwriter: Jim Lauderdale
- Producer: Emory Gordy Jr.

Patty Loveless singles chronology
"The Trouble with the Truth" (1997)	"You Don't Seem to Miss Me" (1997)	"To Have You Back Again" (1998)

"You Don't Seem to Miss Me" is a song written by Jim Lauderdale, and recorded by American country music artist Patty Loveless featuring backing vocals from George Jones. It was released in September 1997 as the first single from her album Long Stretch of Lonesome. The song won Loveless and Jones the 1998 Country Music Association Award for Musical Event of the Year.

The song charted for 20 weeks on the Billboard Hot Country Singles and Tracks chart, reaching number 14 during the week of December 13, 1997.

In 2020, Josh Turner recorded a version of the song featuring Runaway June on backing vocals for his album Country State of Mind.

== Chart positions ==
Chart (1997)	Peak position
Canada Country Singles (RPM)	37
US Bubbling Under Hot 100 (Billboard)	9
US Hot Country Songs (Billboard)	14
