= Further Down the Old Plank Road =

Album by The Chieftains

Studio album by The Chieftains (among others)
- Released: 9 September 2003
- Recorded: 1980–81, 1992 during the Another Country Sessions, 2002, April–May 2003
- Genre: Celtic folk; country folk; bluegrass
- Length: 55:03
- Label: RCA Victor
- Producer: Paddy Moloney

The Chieftains (among others) chronology
Down the Old Plank Road: The Nashville Sessions (2002)	Further Down the Old Plank Road (2003)	Live from Dublin: A Tribute to Derek Bell (2005)

Further Down the Old Plank Road is a 2003 album by The Chieftains. It is a collaboration between the Irish band and many top country music musicians including Rosanne Cash, Chet Atkins, The Nitty Gritty Dirt Band, Ricky Skaggs, and Patty Loveless.

== Track listing ==
1. "The Raggle Taggle Gypsy" - Nickel Creek
2. "Jordan is a Hard Road to Travel" - John Hiatt
3. "Hick's Farewell" - Allison Moorer
4. "Shady Grove" - Tim O'Brien
5. "The Girl I Left Behind" - John Prine
6. "Rosc Catha Na Nuimhain / Arkansas Traveller / The Wild Irishman" - Jerry Douglas
7. "Lambs in the Greenfield" - Emmylou Harris
8. "The Moonshiner / I'm a Rambler" - Joe Ely
9. "Wild Mountain Thyme" - Don Williams
10. "Chief O'Neill's Hornpipe" - Chet Atkins
11. "Bandit of Love / The Cheatin' Waltz" - Carlene Carter
12. "The Squid Jiggin' Ground / Larry O'Gaff" - The Nitty Gritty Dirt Band
13. "Three Little Babes" - Patty Loveless
14. "Fisherman's Hornpipe / The Devil's Dream" - Doc Watson
15. "Talk About Suffering / Man of the House" - Ricky Skaggs
16. "The Lily of the West" - Rosanne Cash

== Personnel ==
The Chieftains

- Paddy Moloney - bagpipes [Uilleann], tin whistle
- Kevin Conneff - bodhrán, vocals
- Derek Bell - dulcimer [Tiompán], harp, keyboards
- Seán Keane - fiddle
- Matt Molloy - flute

Guests

- Jeff White - acoustic guitar, mandolin, vocals (1–8, 13, 16)
- Sara Watkins - fiddle, vocals (1)
- Sean Watkins - acoustic guitar (1)
- Christopher Thile - mandolin, vocals (1)
- Byron House - double bass (1)
- Caroline Lavelle - cello (1, 16)
- Shannon Forrest - drums, (2–4, 6, 8, 13)
- Bryan Sutton - banjo, mandolin, octave mandolin (2–3, 6–7)
- Barry Bales - double bass (2–3, 6)
- Stuart Duncan - fiddle (2, 7)
- John Hiatt - guitar, vocals (2)
- Jeff Taylor - accordion (2)
- Randy Kohrs - resonator guitar [Dobro] (3–4, 7, 13)
- Allison Moorer - vocals (3)
- Pete Wasner - keyboards (3)
- Glenn Worf - bass, double bass (4, 7, 13)
- Tim O'Brien - mandolin, vocals (4)
- Matt Rollings - piano (5, 8)
- Mike Bub - double bass (5, 8)
- John Prine - vocals (5)
- Frankie Lane - resonator guitar [Dobro] (5)
- Kenny Malone - drums (5)
- Mairtin O'Connor - accordion (5)
- Jerry Douglas - resonator guitar [Dobro] (6, 12)
- Emmylou Harris - vocals (7)
- Joe Ely - vocals (8)
- Edgar Meyer - bass (9, 12)
- Don Williams - guitar, vocals (9)
- Béla Fleck - banjo (10, 12, 15)
- Chet Atkins - guitar (10)
- David Hungate - bass (10)
- Carlene Carter - vocals (11)
- Kevin Bents - piano (11)
- Adam Frehm - resonator guitar [Dobro] (11)
- Mike Gordon - bass (11)
- Sharon Shannon - accordion (11)
- Jimmy Ibbotson - guitar (12)
- Jeff Hanna - guitar, vocals (12)
- Jimmy Fadden - drums, harmonica (12)
- Patty Loveless - vocals (13)
- Tim O'Brien - mandolin (13)
- Doc Watson - guitar (14)
- Merle Watson - Guitar (14)
- T. Michael Coleman - bass (14)
- Hank "Bones" Kahn - bones (14)
- Barry Carroll - dulcimer, harp (14)
- Triona Marshall - harp (14)
- Ricky Skaggs - vocals (15)
- Paul Brewster - backing vocals (15)
- Rosanne Cash - vocals (16)
- John Leventhal - acoustic guitar (16)
- Michael Gordon - acoustic bass (16)
- Tom Partington - vintage rope drum (16)
- Margaret Dorn - backing vocals (16)
- Caroline Goodgold - backing vocals (16)
- Deborah Lyons - backing vocals (16)
- Teddy Thompson - backing vocals (16)

== Chart performance ==
Chart (2003)	Peak position
U.S. Billboard Top Country Albums	28
U.S. Billboard 200	180
