= Don't Come Cryin' to Me =

Single by Vince Gill

from the album The Key
- B-side: "I'll Take Texas"
- Released: January 23, 1999
- Genre: Country
- Length: 3:09
- Label: MCA Nashville
- Songwriter(s): Vince Gill, Reed Nielsen
- Producer(s): Tony Brown

Vince Gill singles chronology
"Kindly Keep It Country" (1998)	"Don't Come Cryin' to Me" (1999)	"My Kind of Woman/My Kind of Man" (1999)

"Don't Come Cryin' to Me" is a song co-written and recorded by American country music artist Vince Gill. It was released in January 1999 as the third single from the album The Key. The song reached No. 27 on the Billboard Hot Country Singles & Tracks chart. The song was written by Gill and Reed Nielsen.

== Chart performance ==
Chart (1999)	Park position
US Hot Country Songs (Billboard)	27
US Billboard Hot 100	115
Canadian RPM Country Tracks	24
