= Strong Heart (album) =

Studio album by Patty Loveless
- Released: August 29, 2000
- Studios: Emerald Sound Studios (Nashville, Tennessee)
- Genre: Country pop
- Length: 42:21
- Label: Epic
- Producer: Emory Gordy Jr.

Patty Loveless chronology
| Classics (1999) | Strong Heart (2000) | Mountain Soul (2001) |

Singles from Strong Heart
- 1. "That's the Kind of Mood I'm In" Released: June 2000; 2. "The Last Thing on My Mind" Released: December 2000; 3. "Strong Heart" Released: April 2001

Strong Heart is the tenth studio album by American country music artist Patty Loveless. It was released on August 29, 2000, via Epic Records. It first charted on the Billboard Top Country Albums chart on September 16 (peaking at No. 13), and remaining on the charts for 34 weeks until May 19, 2001. The album also charted briefly on the main Top Billboard 200 chart. Two of the album's singles landed in the Top 20 of Billboard’s Hot Country Singles and Tracks chart : "That's The Kind Of Mood I'm In" (No. 13), and "The Last Thing On My Mind" (No. 20).

== Musical style and composition ==
Strong Heart is considered a departure from Loveless' usual neotraditional country and honky-tonk style for a country pop style compared to performers such as Faith Hill. The album also features elements of hard rock and blues.

== Critical reception ==
Professional ratings
Review scores
| Source | Rating |
|---|---|
| About.com | (favorable) |
| Allmusic | 4.5/5 stars |
| Entertainment Weekly | C+ |
| Los Angeles Times | 2.5/4 stars |
| People | (favorable) |

== Track listing ==
| No. | Title | Writer(s) | Length |
|---|---|---|---|
| 1. | "You're So Cool" | Matraca Berg, Carolyn Dawn Johnson | 3:57 |
| 2. | "The Last Thing on My Mind" | Craig Wiseman, Al Anderson | 3:22 |
| 3. | "My Heart Will Never Break This Way Again" | Gary Harrison, Matraca Berg | 4:15 |
| 4. | "You Don't Get No More" | Emory Gordy Jr., Patty Loveless | 3:26 |
| 5. | "That's the Kind of Mood I'm In" | Rick Giles, Tim Nichols, Gilles Godard | 3:31 |
| 6. | "Thirsty" | Stewart Harris, Thom Hardwell | 4:55 |
| 7. | "Strong Heart" | Kris Tyler, Gordy | 5:41 |
| 8. | "The Key of Love" | Gordy, Anderson | 3:39 |
| 9. | "She Never Stopped Loving Him" | Wally Wilson, Danny Orton | 4:53 |
| 10. | "Pieces on the Ground" | John Bunzow | 4:34 |

== Personnel ==
Musicians

- Patty Loveless – vocals
- Mike Rojas – acoustic piano (1, 5, 8, 9), keyboards (4)
- Steve Nathan – keyboards (2, 3, 6)
- Mike Lawler – lead keyboards (7)
- John Barlow Jarvis – additional keyboards (7), keyboards (10)
- Steve Gibson – electric guitar (1–4, 6), additional electric guitar (7, 8)
- Steuart Smith – electric guitar (1–4, 6, 10), electric lead guitar (7)
- Brent Mason – B-Bender guitar (1)
- Russ Pahl – electric 12-string guitar (1), steel guitar (2, 5, 9), lap steel guitar (10)
- Biff Watson – acoustic guitar (1–7, 9, 10)
- Butch Lee – acoustic guitar (3)
- Richard Bennett – electric guitar (5, 9)
- Kenny Greenberg – electric guitar (5, 9)
- Al Anderson – electric lead guitar (8)
- Dan Dugmore – steel guitar (1, 6, 7), additional lap steel guitar (4, 8), lap steel guitar (10)
- Paul Franklin – steel guitar (3)
- Jerry Douglas – dobro (3, 6), lead lap steel guitar (4, 8)
- Emory Gordy Jr. – bass guitar
- Craig Krampf – drums (1, 2, 4–6, 8, 9), percussion (2, 4, 5, 8)
- Owen Hale – drums (3, 7, 10)
- Steve Earle – harmonica (1)
- Jimmy Hall – harmonica (4, 8)
- Stuart Duncan – fiddle (2, 3, 5, 6, 9)
- Matraca Berg – backing vocals (1)
- Carolyn Dawn Johnson – backing vocals (1)
- Rebecca Lynn Howard – backing vocals (2, 5)
- Ricky Skaggs – backing vocals (2)
- Claire Lynch – backing vocals (3)
- Trisha Yearwood – backing vocals (3)
- Tim Hensley – backing vocals (5)
- Travis Tritt – backing vocals (6)
- Liana Manis – backing vocals (7)
- Curtis Young – backing vocals (7)
- Carmella Ramsey – backing vocals (8)
- Billy Thomas – backing vocals (8)

String and horn sections

- Emory Gordy Jr. – string arrangements (3, 6, 7, 9, 10), horn arrangements (6, 9)
- Steve Nathan – string arrangement concept (6)
- Lauren Koch – contractor

Strings (3, 6, 7, 9, 10)

- Anthony LaMarchina – cello (3, 6, 7, 9, 10)
- Carole Neuen-Rabinowitz – cello (6, 9)
- Craig Nelson – double bass (6, 9)
- Monisa Angell, Jim Grosjean, Kathryn Plummer and Gary Vanosdale – viola
- Conni Ellisor, Connie Heard, Pamela Sixfin, Christian Teal and Mary Kathryn Vanosdale – violin
- Elisabeth Small – violin (6, 9)

Horns (6, 9)

- Bobby Taylor – English horn
- Jennifer Kummer and Leslie Norton – French horn

== Production ==
- Laura Putty – A&R direction
- Emory Gordy Jr. – producer
- John Guess – tracking, mixing
- Russ Martin – overdub recording
- Dennis Ritchie – additional recording
- Patrick Murphy – tracking assistant, mix assistant
- Amy Hughes Frigo – overdub assistant
- Chris Rowe – mix assistant
- Shawn Simpson – mix assistant
- Glenn Meadows – mastering at Masterfonics (Nashville, Tennessee)
- Lauren Koch – production coordinator
- Tonya Derry – A&R coordinator
- Kay Smith – A&R coordinator
- Tracy Baskette – art direction
- Bill Johnson – art direction
- Beth Kindig – art direction
- Caroline Greyshock – photography
- Sheri McCoy Haynes – stylist
- Eric Barnard – hair, make-up
- Ken Levitan for Vector Management – management

== Chart performance ==
| Chart (2000) | Peak position |
|---|---|
| U.S. Billboard Top Country Albums | 13 |
| U.S. Billboard 200 | 126 |
| Canadian RPM Country Albums | 24 |
