= The Last Thing on My Mind (Patty Loveless song) =

Single by Patty Loveless

from the album Strong Heart
- Released: December 26, 2000
- Genre: Country
- Length: 3:22
- Label: Epic
- Songwriters: Craig Wiseman; Al Anderson
- Producer: Emory Gordy Jr.

Patty Loveless singles chronology
"That's the Kind of Mood I'm In" (2000)	"The Last Thing on My Mind" (2000)	"Strong Heart" (2001)

"The Last Thing on My Mind" is a song written by Al Anderson and Craig Wiseman, and recorded by American country music artist Patty Loveless. The song was released in December 2000 as the second single from her album Strong Heart. Rebecca Lynn Howard and Ricky Skaggs join her in background harmony on the song.

== Chart positions ==
The song charted for 22 weeks on the Billboard Hot Country Singles and Tracks chart, reaching No. 20 during the week of April 14, 2001.

Chart (2000–2001)	Peak position
US Hot Country Songs (Billboard)	20
US Bubbling Under Hot 100 (Billboard)	14
