= If You Ever Have Forever in Mind =

Single by Vince Gill

from the album The Key
- B-side: "Given More Time"
- Released: May 25, 1998
- Genre: Country
- Length: 4:38
- Label: MCA Nashville
- Songwriters: Vince Gill, Troy Seals
- Producer: Tony Brown

Vince Gill singles chronology
"You and You Alone" (1997)	"If You Ever Have Forever in Mind" (1998)	"Kindly Keep It Country" (1998)

"If You Ever Have Forever in Mind" is a song co-written and recorded by American country music artist Vince Gill. It was released in May 1998 as the first single from the album The Key. The song reached number 5 on the Billboard Hot Country Singles & Tracks chart and number 1 in Canada. It also won Gill the Grammy Award for Best Male Country Vocal Performance. It was written by Gill and Troy Seals.

== Critical reception ==
Chuck Taylor, of Billboard magazine reviewed the song favorably saying that "there's a classy vintage sound to this soft ballad." He goes on to say that the "delicate piano and whispery percussion underscore Gill's silky vocal performance."

== Music video ==
The music video was directed by Jim Shea and premiered in early 1998.

== Chart performance ==
"If You Ever Have Forever in Mind" debuted at number 61 on the U.S. Billboard Hot Country Singles & Tracks for the week of May 30, 1998.

Chart (1998)	Peak position
Canada Country Singles (RPM)	1
US Billboard Hot 100	60
US Hot Country Songs (Billboard)	5

=== Year-end charts ===
Chart (1998)	Position
Canada Country Tracks (RPM)	20
US Country Songs (Billboard)	43
