= Pretty Little Adriana =

Single by Vince Gill

from the album High Lonesome Sound
- B-side: "Tell Me Lover"
- Released: October 28, 1996
- Genre: Country
- Length: 3:47
- Label: MCA Nashville
- Songwriter: Vince Gill
- Producer: Tony Brown

Vince Gill singles chronology
"Worlds Apart" (1996)	"Pretty Little Adriana" (1996)	"A Little More Love" (1997)

"Pretty Little Adriana" is a song written and recorded by American country music artist Vince Gill. It was released in October 1996 as the third single from the album High Lonesome Sound. The song reached number 2 on the Billboard Hot Country Singles & Tracks chart, behind Brooks & Dunn's "A Man This Lonely" and it won Gill a Grammy Award for Best Male Country Vocal Performance.

== Content ==
The song is about the death of a child as seen from the parents' perspective. Gill was inspired to write the song after reading a news story about a 12-year-old girl named Adriane Dickerson who was shot to death outside a Nashville supermarket in 1995.

== Cover versions ==
Country music singer Luke Combs covered the song from the television special CMT Giants: Vince Gill

== Critical reception ==
Deborah Evans Price, of Billboard magazine gave the song a mixed review, calling it "a little lackluster" and saying that not every song can be an "I Still Believe in You" or a "Go Rest High on That Mountain." However, she goes on to say that the song boasts "tasty guitar work, a pretty melody, and, of course, Gill's signature vocals."

== Chart performance ==
"Pretty Little Adriana" debuted at number 63 on the U.S. Billboard Hot Country Singles & Tracks for the week of November 9, 1996.

Chart (1996–1997)	Peak position
Canada Country Singles (RPM)	3
US Hot Country Songs (Billboard)	2

=== Year-end charts ===
Chart (1997)	Position
Canada Country Tracks (RPM)	31
US Country Songs (Billboard)	31
