= Let's Make Sure We Kiss Goodbye =

Studio album by Vince Gill
- Released: April 18, 2000
- Studio: Sound Kitchen (Franklin, Tennessee); Ocean Way Nashville and Emerald Sound Studios (Nashville, Tennessee)
- Genre: Country
- Length: 46:11
- Label: MCA Nashville
- Producer: Tony Brown

Vince Gill chronology
Breath of Heaven: A Christmas Collection (1998)	Let's Make Sure We Kiss Goodbye (2000)	Tis the Season (2000)

Singles from Let's Make Sure We Kiss Goodbye
- 1. "Let's Make Sure We Kiss Goodbye" Released: January 29, 2000; 2. "Feels Like Love" Released: May 15, 2000; 3. "Shoot Straight from Your Heart" Released: January 20, 2001

Professional ratings
Review scores
Source	Rating
About.com	(favorable) link
AllMusic	link
Chicago Tribune	(mixed) link
Entertainment Weekly	C+ link
Hartford Courant	(positive) link
Los Angeles Times	link
People	(positive) link
Q	link
USA Today	link

Let's Make Sure We Kiss Goodbye is the ninth studio album from American country music artist Vince Gill. It was released in 2000 on MCA Nashville. It features the singles "Let's Make Sure We Kiss Goodbye," "Feels Like Love" and "Shoot Straight from Your Heart."

== Track listing ==
No.	Title	Writer(s)	Length
1.	"One"	Vince Gill	3:47
2.	"Feels Like Love"	Gill	4:15
3.	"Let's Make Sure We Kiss Goodbye"	Gill	4:04
4.	"For the Last Time"	Steve Diamond, Gill	3:52
5.	"When I Look into Your Heart" (duet with Amy Grant)	Gill, Amy Grant	3:07
6.	"Shoot Straight from Your Heart"	Gill	3:52
7.	"The Luckiest Guy in the World"	Gill, Michael Omartian	3:34
8.	"Little Things"	Gill, Leslie Satcher	3:44
9.	"Baby Please Don't Go"	Gill	3:36
10.	"Look What Love's Revealing"	Gill, Grant	4:37
11.	"That Friend of Mine"	Gill, Reed Nielsen	3:20
12.	"Hey God"	Gill	4:23

== Personnel ==
Musicians

- Vince Gill – lead vocals, backing vocals, acoustic guitar, electric guitar, gut-string guitar, banjo, mandolin
- Steve Nathan – keyboards, acoustic piano
- Michael Omartian – keyboards, acoustic piano
- George Marinelli – electric guitar, mandolin
- Brent Mason – acoustic guitar, electric guitar, gut-string guitar
- Randy Scruggs – acoustic guitar, gut-string guitar
- Willie Weeks – bass
- John Hammond – drums, percussion loops
- Mickey Raphael – harmonica
- Jim Horn – saxophones
- Barry Green – trombone
- Mike Haynes – trumpet
- Andrea Zonn – fiddle, viola, backing vocals
- Bob Bailey – backing vocals
- Bekka Bramlett – backing vocals
- Beth Nielsen Chapman – backing vocals
- Kim Fleming – backing vocals
- Thom Flora – backing vocals
- Jenny Gill – backing vocals, harmony vocals (11)
- Amy Grant – lead vocals (5)
- Vicki Hampton – backing vocals
- The Katinas – backing vocals
- Leslie Satcher – backing vocals
- Billy Thomas – backing vocals
- Jeff White – backing vocals

Production

- Tony Brown – producer
- Steve Marcantonio – recording (1–11), overdub recording, mixing
- Rob Charles – recording (12)
- Tim Waters – recording assistant (1–11), overdub recording assistant
- Drew Bollman – additional overdub recording assistant
- Chad Brown – mix assistant
- Denny Purcell – mastering at Georgetown Masters (Nashville, Tennessee)
- Benny Garcia – guitar technician
- Jessie Noble – project coordinator
- Virginia Team – art direction, tray photography
- Bill Tyler – cover concept
- Jerry Joyner – design
- Jim "Señor" McGuire – photography
- Carol Maxwell – grooming
- Trish Townsend – stylist
- Fitzgerald Hartley Co. – management

== Chart performance ==
Chart (2000)	Peak position
U.S. Billboard Top Country Albums	4
U.S. Billboard 200	39
Canadian RPM Country Albums	6

== Certifications ==
Region	Certification	Certified units/sales
United States (RIAA)	Gold	500,000^{^}
^{^} Shipments figures based on certification alone.
