= Feels Like Love (Vince Gill song) =

2000 single by Vince Gill

Single by Vince Gill

from the album Let's Make Sure We Kiss Goodbye
- B-side: "When I Look into Your Heart"
- Released: May 15, 2000
- Genre: Country
- Length: 4:13
- Label: MCA Nashville
- Songwriter: Vince Gill
- Producer: Tony Brown

Vince Gill singles chronology
| "Let's Make Sure We Kiss Goodbye" (2000) | "Feels Like Love" (2000) | "Shoot Straight from Your Heart" (2000) |

"Feels Like Love" is a song written and recorded by American country music artist Vince Gill. It was released in May 2000 as the second single from the album Let's Make Sure We Kiss Goodbye. The song reached number 6 on the Billboard Hot Country Singles & Tracks chart and peaked at number 13 on the Canadian RPM Country Tracks chart.

== Critical reception ==
Deborah Evans Price, of Billboard magazine reviewed the song favorably, saying that it has a "buoyant, uplifting lyric" and goes on saying that the production "gives the sprightly melody plenty of room to breathe."

== Music video ==
The music video was directed by Thom Oliphant and premiered in mid-2000.

== Chart performance ==
"Feels Like Love" debuted at number 62 on the U.S. Billboard Hot Country Singles & Tracks for the week of May 20, 2000. It is Gill's 25th and final solo top ten single on that chart.

| Chart (2000) | Peak position |
|---|---|
| Canada Country Singles (RPM) | 13 |
| US Billboard Hot 100 | 52 |
| US Hot Country Songs (Billboard) | 6 |

=== Year-end charts ===
| Chart (2000) | Position |
|---|---|
| US Country Songs (Billboard) | 29 |
