= You and You Alone (song) =

Single by Vince Gill

from the album High Lonesome Sound
- B-side: "Given More Time"
- Released: July 7, 1997
- Genre: Country
- Length: 3:23
- Label: MCA
- Songwriter: Vince Gill
- Producer: Tony Brown

Vince Gill singles chronology
"A Little More Love" (1997)	"You and You Alone" (1997)	"If You Ever Have Forever in Mind" (1998)

"You and You Alone" is a song written and recorded by American country music artist Vince Gill. It was released in July 1997 as the fifth single from the album High Lonesome Sound. The song reached number 8 on the Billboard Hot Country Singles & Tracks chart. The song features singer-songwriter Shelby Lynne on backing vocals during the chorus, and both performers appeared on the 1997 CMA Awards show performing the song together.

== Critical reception ==
Deborah Evans Price, of Billboard magazine reviewed the song favorably, calling the song "smooth, warm, and swirling with gentle emotion." She goes on to say that the production is "typically classy and understated."

== Music video ==
The music video was directed by Gerry Wenner and premiered in mid-1997.

== Chart performance ==
"You and You Alone" debuted at number 54 on the U.S. Billboard Hot Country Singles & Tracks for the week of July 19, 1997.

Chart (1997)	Peak position
Canada Country Singles (RPM)	8
US Hot Country Songs (Billboard)	8

=== Year-end charts ===
Chart (1997)	Position
Canada Country Tracks (RPM)	66
US Country Songs (Billboard)	61
