= Long Stretch of Lonesome =

Studio album by Patty Loveless
- Released: September 30, 1997
- Studios: Woodland Sound Studios, Masterfonics and Love Shack Studios (Nashville, Tennessee)
- Genre: Neotraditional country
- Length: 39:37
- Label: Epic
- Producer: Emory Gordy, Jr.

Patty Loveless chronology
| The Trouble with the Truth (1996) | Long Stretch of Lonesome (1997) | Classics (1999) |

Singles from Long Stretch of Lonesome
- 1. "You Don't Seem to Miss Me" Released: September 1997; 2. "To Have You Back Again" Released: January 1998; 3. "High on Love" Released: April 1998; 4. "Like Water Into Wine" Released: October 1998

Professional ratings
Review scores
| Source | Rating |
|---|---|
| AllMusic | 4/5 stars |
| Chicago Tribune | 3/4 stars |
| Entertainment Weekly | A− |
| Los Angeles Times | 2.5/4 stars |

Long Stretch of Lonesome is the ninth studio album by American country music artist Patty Loveless, released on September 30, 1997. Three singles charted in the top 20 on the Billboard Hot Country Singles & Tracks chart. Highlights are "High on Love," "To Have You Back Again" and the George Jones-backed "You Don't Seem to Miss Me," each of which both charted in the top 20. "High on Love" was co-written by Jeff Hanna of the Nitty Gritty Dirt Band. The single "Like Water Into Wine" charted at number 57, the first of Loveless' singles since 1986 to not chart in the country top 40. The album went on to be certified Gold for shipments of over 500,000 copies in the U.S.

== Musical style and composition ==
Long Stretch of Lonesome has been described as a neotraditional country and Appalachian blues album.

== Track listing ==
| No. | Title | Writer(s) | Length |
|---|---|---|---|
| 1. | "The Party Ain't Over Yet" | John David | 3:32 |
| 2. | "To Have You Back Again" | Annie Roboff, Arnie Roman | 4:35 |
| 3. | "I Don't Want to Feel Like That" | Don Schlitz, Terry Radigan | 4:19 |
| 4. | "High on Love" | Kostas, Jeff Hanna | 3:03 |
| 5. | "Like Water into Wine" | Gretchen Peters | 4:46 |
| 6. | "That's Exactly What I Mean" | Kim Richey, Tia Sillers | 3:22 |
| 7. | "You Don't Seem to Miss Me" | Jim Lauderdale | 4:07 |
| 8. | "Too Many Memories" | Stephen Bruton | 3:52 |
| 9. | "Long Stretch of Lonesome" | Gary Scruggs, Tony Arata | 3:57 |
| 10. | "Where I'm Bound" | Daryl Burgess, Tom Britt | 4:04 |

== Personnel ==
Musicians

- Patty Loveless – vocals
- John Barlow Jarvis – acoustic piano (1, 2, 4, 9)
- Mike Rojas – additional keyboards (1), keyboards (10)
- Mike Lawler – additional keyboards (2, 5)
- John Hobbs – keyboards (3, 6, 8), Hammond B3 organ (5), acoustic piano (7)
- Butch Lee – Hammond B3 organ (7)
- Richard Bennett – acoustic guitar (1), electric guitar (2, 4, 9)
- Steve Gibson – electric guitar (1–3, 5–7, 9), acoustic guitar (4, 8), Quatra guitar (10)
- Mike Henderson – electric guitar (1)
- Biff Watson – acoustic guitar, electric guitar (4, 9)
- Paul Franklin – slide guitar (1), steel guitar (2, 4, 9, 10)
- Raul Malo – electric guitar (2)
- Brent Mason – electric guitar (7)
- Tom Britt – slide guitar (10)
- Dan Dugmore – steel guitar (3, 5–8), electric guitar (6)
- Jerry Douglas – lap steel guitar (4)
- Emory Gordy Jr. – bass
- Eddie Bayers – drums (1, 2, 4, 9)
- Owen Hale – drums (3, 5–8)
- Harry Stinson – drums (10)
- Stuart Duncan – fiddle (1, 3, 4, 7), mandolin (2, 5, 8, 9)

Background vocalists

- Tim Hensley – backing vocals (1)
- Liana Manis – backing vocals (1, 3, 4)
- Susan Ashton – backing vocals (2)
- Harry Stinson – backing vocals (2)
- Deborah Allen – backing vocals (3)
- Kostas – backing vocals (4)
- Mary Chapin Carpenter – backing vocals (6)
- Kim Richey – backing vocals (6)
- George Jones – backing vocals (7)
- Mac McAnally – backing vocals (8)
- Kathy Burdick – backing vocals (9)
- Vicki Hampton – backing vocals (9)
- Michael Black – backing vocals (10)
- Nanette Bohannon-Britt – backing vocals (10)
- Vickie Carrico – backing vocals (10)

Strings on "Long Stretch of Lonesome"

- Emory Gordy Jr. – string arrangements
- Anthony LaMarchina – cello
- Kathryn Plummer and Kris Wilkinson – viola
- David Davidson, Connie Heard, Clara Olson and Christian Teal – violin

== Production ==
- Emory Gordy Jr. – producer
- Russ Martin – recording
- John Guess – mixing
- Dennis Ritchie – additional recording
- Mark Frigo – recording assistant
- Amy Hughes – recording assistant, additional recording assistant
- Rob McMillan – recording assistant
- Patrick Murphy – mix assistant
- Glenn Meadows – mastering
- Lauren Koch – production coordinator
- Bill Johnson – art direction
- Beth Kindig – design
- Rollow Welch – design
- Randee St. Nicholas – photography
- Ann Waters – styling
- Eric Barnard – hair, make-up
- Fitzgerald / Hartley Co. – management

== Charts ==
=== Weekly charts ===
| Chart (1997) | Peak position |
|---|---|
| Canadian Country Albums (RPM) | 31 |
| US Billboard 200 | 68 |
| US Top Country Albums (Billboard) | 9 |

=== Year-end charts ===
| Chart (1998) | Position |
|---|---|
| US Top Country Albums (Billboard) | 41 |
