= The Essential Chieftains =

2006 greatest hits album by The Chieftains

Greatest hits album by The Chieftains
- Released: 26 September 2006
- Genre: Celtic
- Label: RCA Victor
- Producer: Paddy Moloney

The Chieftains chronology
Live From Dublin: A Tribute To Derek Bell (2005)	The Essential Chieftains (2006)	San Patricio (2010)

Professional ratings
Review scores
Source	Rating
Allmusic	5/5 stars

The Essential Chieftains is a career-spanning greatest hits album by The Chieftains first released in 2006. It is part of the ongoing 'The Essential' Sony BMG compilation series, their last release for RCA ending a 20-year history since signing with the label in 1986.

== Track listing ==
=== Disc 1: The Chieftains Roots ===
1. "Lots of Drops of Brandy" – 3:43
2. "O'Sullivan's March (The Theme from Rob Roy)" – 3:59
3. "An Poc Ar Buile/The Dingle Set" – 5:57
4. "Carolan's Concerto" – 3:05
5. "The Wind That Shakes the Barley/The Reel with the Beryle" – 2:51
6. "Sea Image" – 6:11
7. "Boil the Breakfast Early" – 3:55
8. "The Women of Ireland (The Love Theme from Barry Lyndon)/The Morning Dew" – 5:15
9. "Full of Joy" – 2:31
10. "The Green Fields of America" – 5:39
11. "Santiago de Cuba" – 3:39
12. "The Donegal Set" – 5:46
13. "Jabadaw" – 3:06
14. "The Bells of Dublin/Christmas Eve" – 3:06
15. "The French March" – 4:51
16. "The Stone" – 6:23
17. "The Munster Cloak/Tabhair Dom Do Lamh (Give Me Your Hand)" with James Galway - 4:29
18. "Chasing the Fox" (From the Ballad of the Irish Horse) – 3:26

=== Disc 2: The Chieftains and Friends ===
1. "I Know My Love" (with The Corrs) – 3:52
2. "Shenandoah" (with Van Morrison) – 3:52
3. "Country Blues" (with Buddy & Julie Miller) – 3:13
4. "Ladies Pantalettes/Belles of Blackville/First House in Connaught (Reels)" (with Béla Fleck) – 4:14
5. "The Foggy Dew" (with Sinéad O'Connor) – 5:20
6. "Red Is the Rose" (with Nanci Griffith) – 3:25
7. "The Squid Jiggin' Ground/Larry O'Gaff" (with The Nitty Gritty Dirt Band) – 3:16
8. "Lambs In the Greenfields" (with Emmylou Harris) – 3:21
9. "Guadalupe " (with Linda Ronstadt & Los Lobos) – 2:51
10. "Mo Ghile Mear - Our Hero" (with Sting) – 3:20
11. "Cotton-Eyed Joe" (with Ricky Skaggs) – 2:42
12. "Molly Bán (Bawn)" (with Alison Krauss) – 4:45
13. "Long Journey Home (Anthem)" (with Elvis Costello & Anúna) – 4:17
14. "The Rocky Road To Dublin" (with The Rolling Stones) (not on all releases) – 5:03
15. "Love Is Teasin'" (with Marianne Faithfull) – 4:37
16. "The Rebel Jesus" (with Jackson Browne) – 3:49
17. "Il Est Né/Ça Berger" (with Kate & Anna McGarrigle) – 5:19
18. "Jimmy Mó Mhíle Stór" (with The Rankins) – 4:37
