= Worlds Apart (Vince Gill song) =

Single by Vince Gill

from the album High Lonesome Sound
- B-side: "Down to New Orleans"
- Released: July 15, 1996
- Genre: Country
- Length: 5:43 (album version); 4:43 (video version); 4:05 (radio edit)
- Label: MCA
- Songwriters: Vince Gill, Bob DiPiero
- Producer: Tony Brown

Vince Gill singles chronology
"High Lonesome Sound" (1996)	"Worlds Apart" (1996)	"Pretty Little Adriana" (1996)

"Worlds Apart" is a song co-written and recorded by the American country music artist Vince Gill. It was released in July 1996 as the second single from the album High Lonesome Sound. The song reached number 5 on the Billboard Hot Country Singles & Tracks chart and won Gill a Grammy Award for Best Male Country Vocal Performance. It was written by Gill and Bob DiPiero.

== Content ==
The song is a ballad about a strained relationship.

== Critical reception ==
Deborah Evans Price, of Billboard magazine reviewed the song favorably, calling the song "slow, stately, polished, but oozing with raw emotion."

== Music video ==
The music video was directed by Jim Shea and was premiered in mid-1996. It is entirely black and white.

== Chart performance ==
"Worlds Apart" entered the U.S. Billboard Hot Country Singles & Tracks at number 69 for the week of July 20, 1996.

Chart (1996)	Peak position
Canada Country Singles (RPM)	6
US Hot Country Songs (Billboard)	5

=== Year-end charts ===
Chart (1996)	Position
Canada Country Tracks (RPM)	62
US Country Songs (Billboard)	57
