= The Key (Vince Gill album) =

Studio album by Vince Gill
- Released: August 11, 1998
- Studios: Big Javelina, Emerald Sound Studios, Ocean Way Nashville and Sound Emporium Studios (Nashville, Tennessee); Sound Kitchen (Franklin, Tennessee)
- Genre: Country
- Length: 45:15
- Label: MCA Nashville
- Producer: Tony Brown

Vince Gill chronology
High Lonesome Sound (1996)	The Key (1998)	Breath of Heaven: A Christmas Collection (1998)

Singles from The Key
- 1. "If You Ever Have Forever in Mind" Released: May 25, 1998; 2. "Kindly Keep It Country" Released: October 10, 1998; 3. "Don't Come Cryin' to Me" Released: January 23, 1999; 4. "My Kind of Woman/My Kind of Man" Released: May 24, 1999

Professional ratings
Review scores
Source	Rating
AllMusic	4.5/5 stars
Chicago Tribune	(favorable)
Entertainment Weekly	A

The Key is the eighth studio album from American country music artist Vince Gill. It was released in 1998 on MCA Nashville. It features the singles "If You Ever Have Forever in Mind," "Kindly Keep It Country," "Don't Come Cryin' to Me" (an uncredited duet with Dawn Sears) and "My Kind of Woman/My Kind of Man." This final track was also included on Patty Loveless's 1999 compilation album, Classics. This was Gill's first No. 1 Country Album.

== Track listing ==
All songs written by Vince Gill except where noted.

No.	Title	Writer(s)	Length
1.	"Don't Come Cryin' to Me" (featuring Dawn Sears)	Gill, Reed Nielsen	3:06
2.	"If You Ever Have Forever in Mind"	Gill, Troy Seals	4:38
3.	"I Never Really Knew You"		2:14
4.	"Kindly Keep It Country"		3:09
5.	"All Those Years"		3:57
6.	"I'll Take Texas"		2:05
7.	"My Kind of Woman/My Kind of Man" (duet with Patty Loveless)		3:53
8.	"There's Not Much Love Here Anymore"		3:28
9.	"Let Her In"		3:03
10.	"The Hills of Caroline"		4:44
11.	"Live to Tell It All"	Gill, Sonya Isaacs	3:36
12.	"What They All Call Love"		3:20
13.	"The Key to Life"		4:02

== Personnel ==
Compiled from liner notes.

The band

- Vince Gill – vocals, acoustic guitar, electric guitar, mandolin
- Hargus "Pig" Robbins – keyboards, acoustic piano
- Steve Gibson – acoustic guitar, electric guitar
- Randy Scruggs – acoustic guitar
- John Hughey – steel guitar
- Glenn Worf – bass
- Eddie Bayers – drums
- Stuart Duncan – fiddle
- Larry Franklin – fiddle
- Bergen White – string arrangements and conductor
- Patty Loveless – vocals on "My Kind of Woman/My Kind of Man"

Background vocalists

- Bergen White – BGV arrangements
- Dawn Sears (Track 1)
- Lisa Cochran, Michael Eldred, Jon Mark Ivey, Marabeth Jordan, Lisa Silver and Dennis Wilson (Track 2)
- Sara Evans (Track 3)
- Lee Ann Womack (Track 4)
- Liana Manis and Curtis Young (Track 5)
- Shelby Lynne (Tracks 6 & 8)
- Sonya Isaacs, Billy Thomas and Jeff White (Track 9)
- Alison Krauss, Billy Thomas and Jeff White (10)
- Sonya Isaacs (Track 11)
- Faith Hill (Track 12)

== Production ==
- Tony Brown – producer
- Chuck Ainlay – recording, mixing
- Steve Marcantonio – recording
- Tim Coyle – second engineer
- Steve Crowder – second engineer
- Chris Davie – second engineer
- Todd Gunnerson – second engineer
- Mark Ralston – second engineer
- Glenn Spinner – second engineer
- Aaron Swihart – second engineer
- Denny Purcell – mastering at Georgetown Masters (Nashville, Tennessee)
- Benny Garcia – guitar technician
- Jessie Noble – project coordinator
- Virginia Team – art direction
- Chuck Ferrara – design
- Jim "Señor" McGuire – photography

== Charts ==
=== Weekly charts ===
Chart (1998)	Peak position
Canadian Albums (RPM)	25
Canadian Country Albums (RPM)	2
US Billboard 200	11
US Top Country Albums (Billboard)	1

=== Year-end charts ===
Chart (1998)	Position
US Billboard 200	173
US Top Country Albums (Billboard)	24

Chart (1999)	Position
US Top Country Albums (Billboard)	20

== Certifications ==
Region	Certification	Certified units/sales
United States (RIAA)	Platinum	1,000,000^{^}
^{^} Shipments figures based on certification alone.
