= Barry Bales =

American bassist

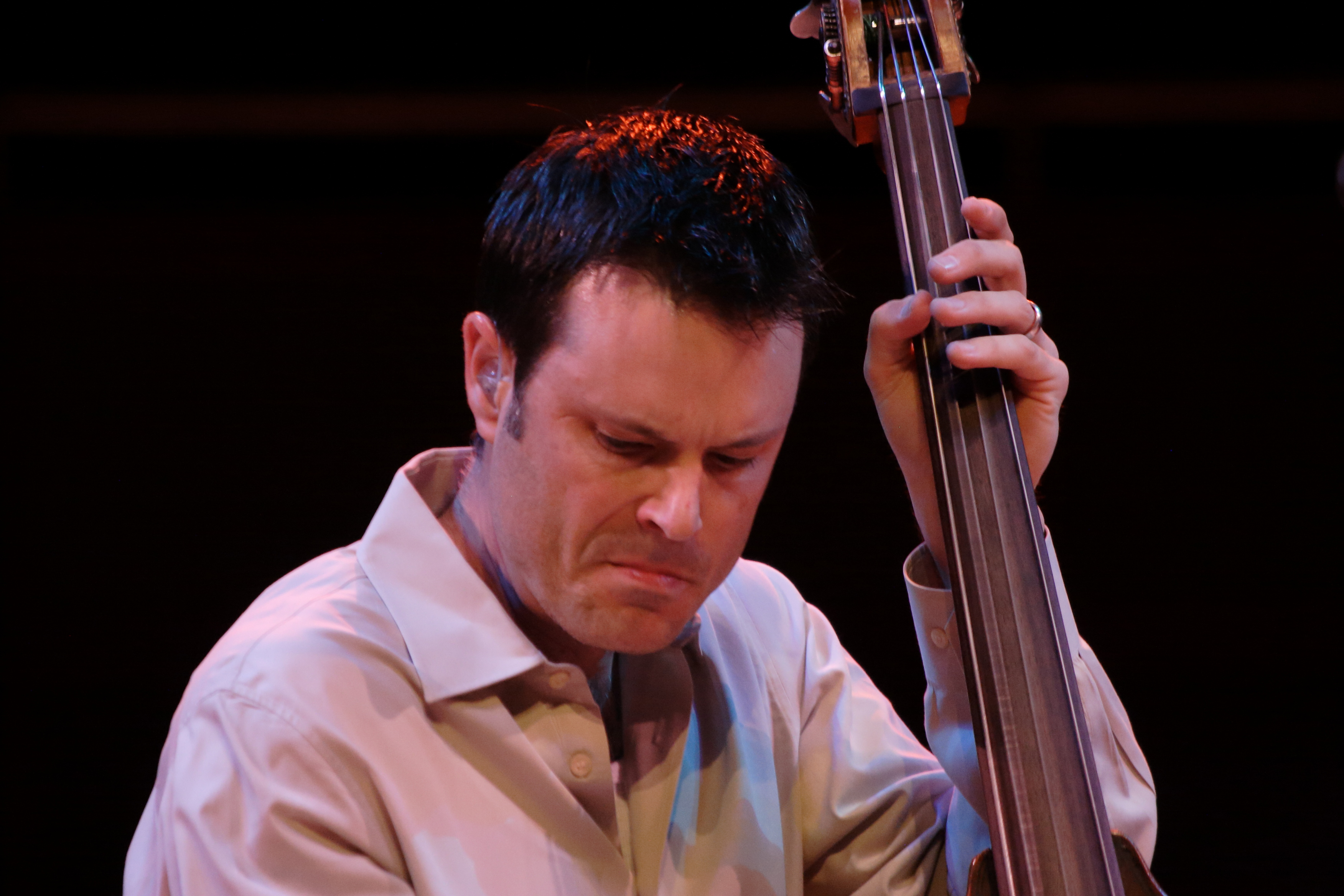
- Born: Barry Turner Bales; August 23, 1969 (age 56); Kingsport, Tennessee, U.S.
- Occupation: Musician

Barry Turner Bales (born August 23, 1969) is an American musician best known as the long time bass player and harmony vocalist for Alison Krauss and Union Station. He has been in the band since 1990. The 2012 Grammy was awarded as a member of the Union Station band on Paper Airplane. He is also a member of The Earls of Leicester.

== Career ==
Bales grew up in Colonial Heights, Tennessee, outside of Kingsport, Tennessee and attended Sullivan South High School. Early memories of music include listening to the records of Bill Monroe, Flatt & Scruggs, the Stanley Brothers, Bob Wills, Buck Owens and Hank Thompson from his father's extensive collection. He started experimenting with various instruments at the age of 10, starting with guitar. By age 15, Bales had found the bass and was playing regionally in various groups. Bales attended East Tennessee State University, participating in the Bluegrass, Old Time, and Country Music program, as did future Union Station members Tim Stafford and Adam Steffey.

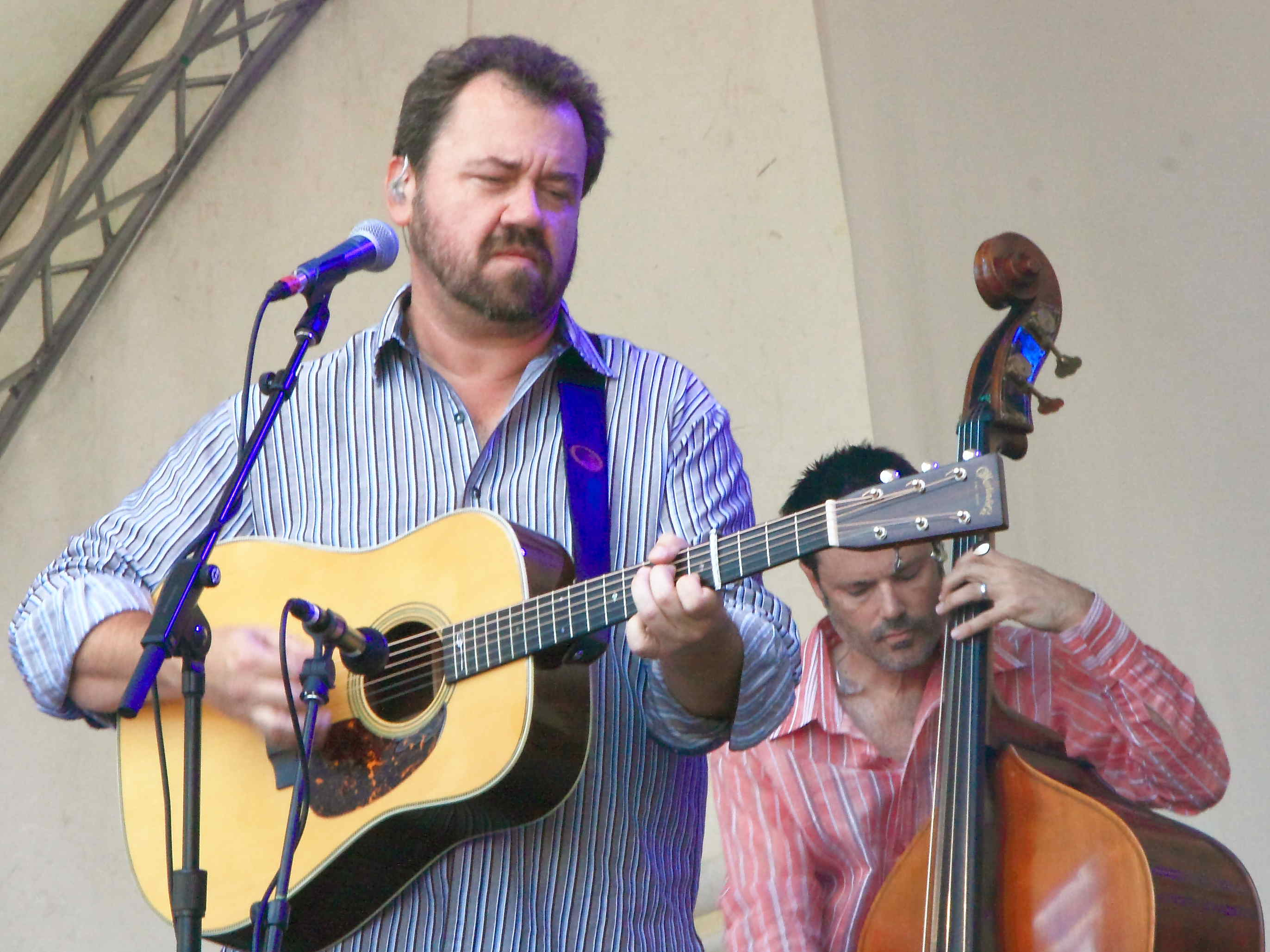
Bales (right) with Dan Tyminski (left), July 2012

Over the years, Bales has become one of the most in-demand session musicians in acoustic music. He has recorded and performed with such artists as Reba McEntire, Susan Ashton, Merle Haggard, Ronnie Bowman, The Cox Family, Vince Gill, Dolly Parton, Dan Tyminski, Patty Loveless amongst others.

He currently resides in Greene County, Tennessee with his wife Aliceson (née Osborn) and their young son.
