= Souvenirs (Vince Gill album) =

Greatest hits album by Vince Gill
- Released: November 21, 1995
- Genre: Country
- Length: 54:39
- Label: MCA Nashville
- Producer: Tony Brown; Steve Buckingham; Reba McEntire; Dolly Parton

Vince Gill chronology
The Essential Vince Gill (1995)	Souvenirs (1995)	High Lonesome Sound (1996)

Professional ratings
Review scores
Source	Rating
AllMusic	link
Entertainment Weekly	B+ link

Souvenirs is the sixth compilation album from American country music artist Vince Gill. It was released in 1995 on MCA Nashville. The album contained Gill's duet with Dolly Parton on her classic composition "I Will Always Love You", also appearing on Parton's Something Special album. The duet was released as a single in late 1995, reaching the Top 20 on the U.S. country singles chart.

== Track listing ==
No.	Title	Writer(s)	Length
1.	"Never Alone"	Rosanne Cash, Vince Gill	3:36
2.	"Never Knew Lonely" (single version)	Gill	3:46
3.	"When I Call Your Name"	Tim DuBois, Gill	4:15
4.	"Liza Jane"	Gill, Reed Nielsen	2:55
5.	"Look at Us"	Max D. Barnes, Gill	3:59
6.	"Take Your Memory with You"	Gill	2:33
7.	"Pocket Full of Gold"	Brian Allsmiller, Gill	4:05
8.	"The Heart Won't Lie" (duet with Reba McEntire)	Kim Carnes, Donna Terry Weiss	3:21
9.	"Don't Let Our Love Start Slippin' Away"	Gill, Pete Wasner	3:44
10.	"I Still Believe in You"	Gill, John Barlow Jarvis	3:58
11.	"No Future in the Past"	Gill, Carl Jackson	4:09
12.	"Tryin' to Get Over You"	Gill	3:45
13.	"One More Last Chance"	Gill, Gary Nicholson	3:11
14.	"I Can't Tell You Why"	Glenn Frey, Don Henley, Timothy B. Schmit	4:03
15.	"I Will Always Love You" (duet with Dolly Parton)	Dolly Parton	3:19

== Chart performance ==
=== Weekly charts ===
Chart (1995)	Peak position
Canadian Albums (RPM)	17
Canadian Country Albums (RPM)	3
US Billboard 200	11
US Top Country Albums (Billboard)	3

=== Year-end charts ===
Chart (1996)	Position
US Billboard 200	43
US Top Country Albums (Billboard)	8
Chart (1997)	Position
US Top Country Albums (Billboard)	48

== Certifications ==
Region	Certification	Certified units/sales
United States (RIAA)	3× Platinum	3,000,000^{^}
^{^} Shipments figures based on certification alone.
