= The Best of Vince Gill =

Compilation album by Vince Gill
- Released: September 25, 1989
- Genre: Country
- Length: 34:59
- Label: RCA Records
- Producer: Emory Gordy Jr.; Richard Landis; Barry Beckett

Vince Gill chronology
The Way Back Home (1987)	The Best of Vince Gill (1989)	When I Call Your Name (1989)

Professional ratings
Review scores
Source	Rating
AllMusic	3/5 stars

The Best of Vince Gill is the first compilation album by Vince Gill, released in 1989. This album was certified Platinum by the RIAA on February 1, 1995.

== Track listing ==
No.	Title	Writer(s)	Original Album	Length
1.	"Turn Me Loose"	Vince Gill	Turn Me Loose (1984)	3:08
2.	"Oh Carolina"	Jim Elliott; Mark D. Sanders; Randy Albright	Turn Me Loose	3:15
3.	"Victim of Life's Circumstances"	Delbert McClinton	Turn Me Loose	3:17
4.	"Lucy Dee"	Steve Earle	Previously unreleased	3:52
5.	"Oklahoma Borderline"	Vince Gill; Guy Clark; Rodney Crowell	The Things That Matter (1985)	3:34
6.	"Cinderella"	Reed Nielsen	The Way Back Home (1987)	3:31
7.	"Let's Do Something"	Vince Gill; Reed Nielsen	The Way Back Home	3:15
8.	"The Radio"	Vince Gill; Reed Nielsen	The Way Back Home	3:59
9.	"I've Been Hearing Things About You"	Vince Gill	Previously unreleased	3:10
10.	"I Never Knew Lonely"	Vince Gill	Previously unreleased; later re-recorded for When I Call Your Name (1989)	3:58
Total length:				34:59

Track information and credits adapted from Discogs and AllMusic, then verified from the album's liner notes.

== Musicians ==
- Backing Vocals – Bonnie Raitt, Emmylou Harris, Rodney Crowell, Rosanne Cash, Sweethearts of the Rodeo

== Production ==
- Emory Gordy Jr. – Producer (Tracks 1–5)
- Richard Landis – Producer (Track 6–8)
- Barry Beckett – Producer (Track 9–10)
- Mary Hamilton – Art Direction
- Katherine DeVault Design – Design
- Dennis Keeley – Photography

== Certifications ==
Region	Certification	Certified units/sales
United States (RIAA)	Platinum	1,000,000^{^}
^{^} Shipments figures based on certification alone.
