= List of awards and nominations received by Dwight Yoakam =

Dwight Yoakam awards and nominations
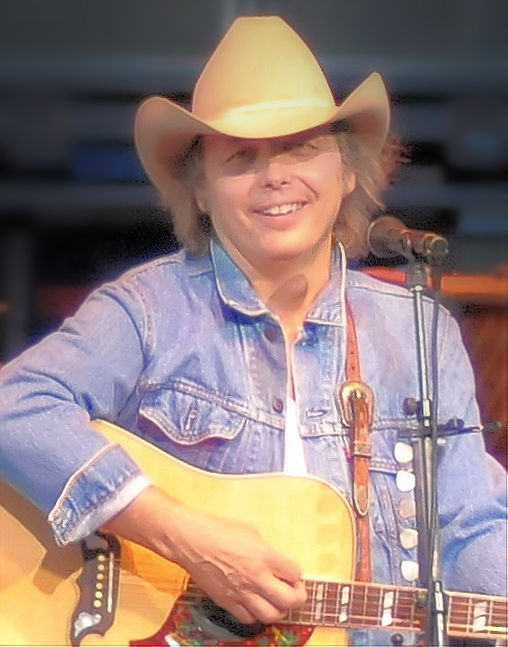
- Yoakam in 2008
Awards and nominations
Award	Wins	Nominations
Academy of Country Music Awards	1	11
Country Music Association Awards	0	8
Grammy Awards	2	18

Totals (Note: Certain award groups do not simply award one winner. They acknowledge several different recipients, have runners-up, and have third place. Since this is a specific recognition and is different from losing an award, runner-up mentions are considered wins in this award tally. For simplification and to avoid errors, each award in this list has been presumed to have had a prior nomination.)
- Wins: 3
- Nominations: 37

American country music singer Dwight Yoakam has won three major music industry awards. These consist of two Grammy Awards and one Academy of Country Music award.

His first nomination and first win were from the Academy of Country Music in 1986, from which he won Top New Male Vocalist. Yoakam's Grammy Award wins are for Best Male Country Vocal Performance (for "Ain't That Lonely Yet") at the 36th Annual Grammy Awards, and Best Country Collaboration with Vocals (as part of the multi-artist collaboration "Same Old Train") at the 41st Annual Grammy Awards.

== List of awards ==
Year	Association	Category	Nominated work	Result
1986	Academy of Country Music	Top New Male Vocalist	—N/a	Won
1986	Academy of Country Music	Album of the Year	Guitars, Cadillacs, Etc., Etc.	Nominated
1986	Country Music Association	Horizon Award	—N/a	Nominated
1986	Country Music Association	Music Video of the Year	"Honky Tonk Man"	Nominated
1987	Academy of Country Music	Country Music Video of the Year	"Little Sister"	Nominated
1987	Grammy Awards	Best Country Song	"Guitars, Cadillacs"	Nominated
1987	Grammy Awards	Best Male Country Vocal Performance	Guitars, Cadillacs, Etc. Etc.	Nominated
1988	Academy of Country Music	Top Vocal Duet	"Streets of Bakersfield" (with Buck Owens)	Nominated
1988	Academy of Country Music	Top Male Vocalist	—N/a	Nominated
1988	Academy of Country Music	Album of the Year	Buenas Noches from a Lonely Room	Nominated
1988	Country Music Association	Vocal Event of the Year	"Streets of Bakersfield" (with Buck Owens)	Nominated
1988	Grammy Awards	Best Male Country Vocal Performance	Hillbilly Deluxe	Nominated
1989	Grammy Awards	Best Country Collaboration with Vocals	"Streets of Bakersfield" (with Buck Owens)	Nominated
1989	Grammy Awards	Best Male Country Vocal Performance	Buenas Noches from a Lonely Room	Nominated
1990	Grammy Awards	Best Country Vocal Collaboration	"Sin City" (with k. d. lang)	Nominated
1991	Grammy Awards	Best Male Country Vocal Performance	"Turn It On, Turn It Up, Turn Me Loose"	Nominated
1992	Academy of Country Music	Top Vocal Duet	"Send a Message to My Heart" (with Patty Loveless)	Nominated
1992	Country Music Association	Vocal Event of the Year	"Sweet Suzanne" (as part of Buzzin' Cousins)	Nominated
1993	Academy of Country Music	Album of the Year	This Time	Nominated
1993	Academy of Country Music	Single of the Year	"Ain't That Lonely Yet"	Nominated
1993	Country Music Association	Single of the Year	"Ain't That Lonely Yet"	Nominated
1994	Country Music Association	Male Vocalist of the Year	—N/a	Nominated
1994	Grammy Awards	Best Male Country Vocal Performance	"Ain't That Lonely Yet"	Won
1994	Grammy Awards	Best Country Vocal Collaboration	"Miner's Prayer" (with Ralph Stanley)	Nominated
1995	Grammy Awards	Best Male Country Vocal Performance	"Pocket of a Clown"	Nominated
1996	Grammy Awards	Best Male Country Vocal Performance	"A Thousand Miles from Nowhere"	Nominated
1996	Grammy Awards	Best Country Album	Dwight Live	Nominated
1997	Grammy Awards	Best Male Country Vocal Performance	"Nothing"	Nominated
1997	Grammy Awards	Best Country Album	Gone	Nominated
1998	Academy of Country Music	Vocal Event of the Year	"Same Old Train" (with various artists)	Nominated
1998	Grammy Awards	Best Country Album	Under the Covers	Nominated
1999	Country Music Association	Vocal Event of the Year	"Same Old Train" (with various artists)	Nominated
1999	Grammy Awards	Best Country Collaboration with Vocals	"Same Old Train" (with various artists)	Won
2000	Grammy Awards	Best Male Country Vocal Performance	"Crazy Little Thing Called Love"	Nominated
2001	Country Music Association	Vocal Event of the Year	"Alright, I'm Wrong" (with Buck Owens)	Nominated
2001	Grammy Awards	Best Male Country Vocal Performance	"A Thousand Miles from Nowhere" (re-recording)	Nominated
2011	Academy of Country Music	Cliffie Stone Pioneer Award	—N/a	Won
