= Grammy Award for Best Male Country Vocal Performance =

Music award

- Awarded for: quality of male vocal performance in country music.
- Country: United States
- Presented by: National Academy of Recording Arts and Sciences
- First award: 1965
- Final award: 2011
- Website: grammy.com

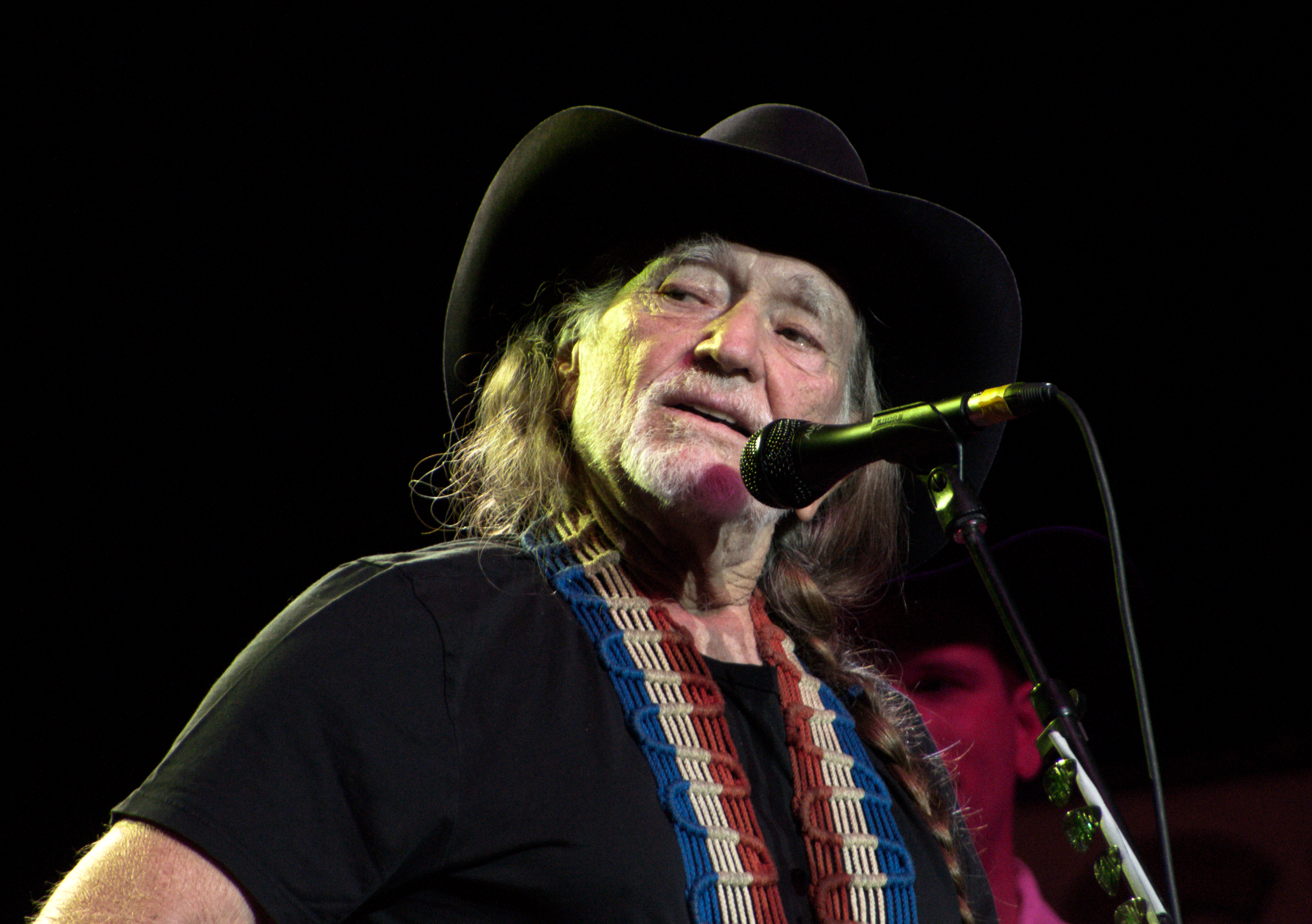
Willie Nelson 2009, count basie theater, New Jersey

The Grammy Award for Best Male Country Vocal Performance was awarded between 1965 and 2011. The award has had several minor name changes:

- From 1965 to 1967 the award was known as Best Country & Western Vocal Performance - Male
- In 1968 it was awarded as Best Country & Western Solo Vocal Performance, Male
- From 1969 to 1994 it was awarded as Best Country Vocal Performance, Male
- From 1995 to 2011 it was awarded as Best Male Country Vocal Performance

The award was discontinued after the 2011 awards season in a major overhaul of Grammy categories. From 2012, all solo performances (male, female and instrumental) in the country category will be shifted to the newly formed Best Country Solo Performance category.

Years reflect the year in which the Grammy Awards were presented, for works released in the previous year.

== Recipients ==
=== 1960s ===
Year	Artist	Work
1965	Roger Miller	"Dang Me"
1965	Bobby Bare	"Four Strong Winds"
1965	Johnny Cash	"I Walk the Line"
1965	George Hamilton IV	Fort Worth, Dallas or Houston
1965	Sonny James	You're the Only World I Know
1965	Hank Locklin	Hank Locklin Sings Hank Williams
1965	Buck Owens	"My Heart Skips a Beat"
1966	Roger Miller	"King of the Road"
1966	Eddy Arnold	"Make the World Go Away"
1966	Bobby Bare	"Talk Me Some Sense"
1966	Carl Belew	"Crystal Chandelier"
1966	Jim Reeves	"Is It Really Over?"
1967	David Houston	"Almost Persuaded"
1967	Ben Colder	"Almost Persuaded No. 2"
1967	Jack Greene	"There Goes My Everything"
1967	Charley Pride	"Just Between You and Me"
1967	Jim Reeves	"Distant Drums"
1968	Glen Campbell	"Gentle on My Mind"
1968	Jim Ed Brown	"Pop a Top"
1968	Jack Greene	"All the Time"
1968	Charley Pride	"Does My Ring Hurt Your Finger"
1968	Porter Wagoner	"The Cold Hard Facts of Life"
1969	Johnny Cash	"Folsom Prison Blues"
1969	Glen Campbell	"I Wanna Live"
1969	Henson Cargill	"Skip a Rope"
1969	Roger Miller	"Little Green Apples"
1969	Porter Wagoner	"The Carroll County Accident"

=== 1970s ===
Year	Artist	Work
1970	Johnny Cash	"A Boy Named Sue"
1970	Clay Hart	"Spring"
1970	Bobby Lewis	"From Heaven to Heartache"
1970	Charley Pride	"All I Have to Offer You (Is Me)"
1970	Jerry Reed	"Are You from Dixie ('Cause I'm from Dixie Too)"
1971	Ray Price	"For the Good Times"
1971	Johnny Cash	"Sunday Mornin' Comin' Down"
1971	Merle Haggard	Okie from Muskogee
1971	Charley Pride	Charley Pride's 10th Album
1971	Jerry Reed	"Amos Moses"
1972	Jerry Reed	"When You're Hot, You're Hot"
1972	Freddie Hart	"Easy Loving"
1972	Johnny Paycheck	"She's All I Got"
1972	Ray Price	"I Won't Mention It Again"
1972	Charley Pride	"Kiss an Angel Good Mornin'"
1973	Charley Pride	Charley Pride Sings Heart Songs
1973	Merle Haggard	"It's Not Love (But It's Not Bad)"
1973	Waylon Jennings	"Good Hearted Woman"
1973	Jerry Lee Lewis	"Chantilly Lace"
1973	Charlie Rich	"I Take It on Home"
1974	Charlie Rich	"Behind Closed Doors"
1974	Tom T. Hall	"(Old Dogs, Children and) Watermelon Wine"
1974	Kris Kristofferson	"Why Me"
1974	Charley Pride	"Amazing Love"
1974	Johnny Russell	"Rednecks, White Socks and Blue Ribbon Beer"
1975	Ronnie Milsap	"Please Don't Tell Me How the Story Ends"
1975	Glen Campbell	"Bonaparte's Retreat"
1975	Roy Clark	The Entertainer
1975	Waylon Jennings	"I'm a Ramblin' Man"
1975	Charley Pride	Country Feelin'
1976	Willie Nelson	"Blue Eyes Crying in the Rain"
1976	Glen Campbell	"Country Boy (You Got Your Feet in L.A.)"
1976	John Denver	"Thank God I'm a Country Boy"
1976	Freddy Fender	"Before the Next Teardrop Falls"
1976	Waylon Jennings	"Are You Sure Hank Done It This Way"
1976	Ray Stevens	"Misty"
1977	Ronnie Milsap	"(I'm A) Stand by My Woman Man"
1977	Mac Davis	"Forever Lovers"
1977	Larry Gatlin	"Broken Lady"
1977	Waylon Jennings	"Are You Ready for the Country"
1977	Willie Nelson	"I'd Have to Be Crazy"
1978	Kenny Rogers	"Lucille"
1978	Larry Gatlin	"I Don't Wanna Cry"
1978	Waylon Jennings	"Luckenbach, Texas (Back to the Basics of Love)"
1978	Ronnie Milsap	"It Was Almost Like a Song"
1978	Jerry Jeff Walker	"Mr. Bojangles"
1979	Willie Nelson	"Georgia on My Mind"
1979	Waylon Jennings	"I've Always Been Crazy"
1979	Ronnie Milsap	"Let's Take the Long Way Around the World"
1979	Johnny Paycheck	"Take This Job and Shove It"
1979	Elvis Presley	"Softly, as I Leave You"
1979	Kenny Rogers	"Love or Something Like It"

=== 1980s ===
Year	Artist	Work
1980	Kenny Rogers	"The Gambler"
1980	Willie Nelson	"Whiskey River"
1980	Charley Pride	"Burgers and Fries/When I Stop Leavin' (I'll Be Gone)"
1980	Eddie Rabbitt	"Every Which Way but Loose"
1980	Hank Williams Jr.	"Family Tradition"
1981	George Jones	"He Stopped Loving Her Today"
1981	George Burns	"I Wish I Was Eighteen Again"
1981	Johnny Lee	"Lookin' for Love"
1981	Willie Nelson	"On the Road Again"
1981	Eddie Rabbitt	"Drivin' My Life Away"
1982	Ronnie Milsap	"(There's) No Gettin' Over Me"
1982	John Anderson	"I'm Just an Old Chunk of Coal (But I'm Gonna Be a Diamond Someday)"
1982	Willie Nelson	"Somewhere over the Rainbow"
1982	Eddie Rabbitt	"Step by Step"
1982	George Jones	"Still Doin' Time"
1983	Willie Nelson	"Always on My Mind"
1983	Ronnie Milsap	"He Got You"
1983	Jerry Reed	"She Got the Goldmine (I Got the Shaft)"
1983	Kenny Rogers	"Love Will Turn You Around"
1983	Ricky Skaggs	"Heartbroke"
1984	Lee Greenwood	"I.O.U."
1984	Ray Charles	"Born to Love Me"
1984	Earl Thomas Conley	"Holding Her and Loving You"
1984	Vern Gosdin	"If You're Gonna Do Me Wrong (Do It Right)"
1984	Ronnie Milsap	"Stranger in My House"
1984	Kenny Rogers	"All My Life"
1985	Merle Haggard	"That's the Way Love Goes"
1985	Lee Greenwood	"God Bless the USA"
1985	Willie Nelson	"City of New Orleans"
1985	Ricky Skaggs	"Country Boy"
1985	Hank Williams Jr.	"All My Rowdy Friends Are Coming Over Tonight"
1986	Ronnie Milsap	"Lost in the Fifties Tonight (In the Still of the Night)"
1986	Lee Greenwood	"I Don't Mind the Thorns (If You're the Rose)"
1986	Mel McDaniel	"Baby's Got Her Blue Jeans On"
1986	Willie Nelson	"Forgiving You Was Easy"
1986	Ricky Skaggs	"You Make Me Feel Like a Man"
1987	Ronnie Milsap	Lost in the Fifties Tonight
1987	Steve Earle	"Guitar Town"
1987	Randy Travis	"Diggin' Up Bones"
1987	Hank Williams Jr.	"Ain't Misbehavin'"
1987	Dwight Yoakam	"Guitars, Cadillacs"
1988	Randy Travis	Always & Forever
1988	Steve Earle	Exit 0
1988	George Strait	"All My Ex's Live in Texas"
1988	Hank Williams Jr.	Born to Boogie
1988	Dwight Yoakam	Hillbilly Deluxe
1989	Randy Travis	Old 8x10
1989	Rodney Crowell	Diamonds & Dirt
1989	Lyle Lovett	Pontiac
1989	Dan Seals	"Addicted"
1989	Dwight Yoakam	Buenas Noches from a Lonely Room

=== 1990s ===
Year	Artist	Work
1990	Lyle Lovett	Lyle Lovett and His Large Band
1990	Clint Black	Killin' Time
1990	Rodney Crowell	"After All This Time"
1990	Randy Travis	"It's Just a Matter of Time"
1990	Keith Whitley	"I'm No Stranger to the Rain"
1991	Vince Gill	"When I Call Your Name"
1991	Garth Brooks	"Friends In Low Places"
1991	Doug Stone	"I'd Be Better Off (In a Pine Box)"
1991	Randy Travis	"Hard Rock Bottom of Your Heart"
1991	Dwight Yoakam	"Turn It On, Turn It Up, Turn Me Loose"
1992	Garth Brooks	Ropin' the Wind
1992	Billy Dean	"Somewhere in My Broken Heart"
1992	Vince Gill	Pocket Full of Gold
1992	Alan Jackson	Don't Rock the Jukebox
1992	Travis Tritt	"Here's a Quarter (Call Someone Who Cares)"
1993	Vince Gill	"I Still Believe in You"
1993	Garth Brooks	The Chase
1993	Billy Ray Cyrus	"Achy Breaky Heart"
1993	Randy Travis	"Better Class of Losers"
1993	Travis Tritt	"Lord Have Mercy on the Working Man"
1994	Dwight Yoakam	"Ain't That Lonely Yet"
1994	Garth Brooks	"Ain't Goin' Down ('Til the Sun Comes Up)"
1994	Alan Jackson	"Chattahoochee"
1994	George Jones	"I Don't Need Your Rockin' Chair"
1994	Aaron Neville	"The Grand Tour"
1995	Vince Gill	"When Love Finds You"
1995	David Ball	"Thinkin' Problem"
1995	John Berry	"Your Love Amazes Me"
1995	John Michael Montgomery	"I Swear"
1995	Dwight Yoakam	"Pocket of a Clown"
1996	Vince Gill	"Go Rest High on That Mountain"
1996	John Berry	"Standing on the Edge of Goodbye"
1996	Alan Jackson	"Gone Country"
1996	John Michael Montgomery	"I Can Love You Like That"
1996	Dwight Yoakam	"A Thousand Miles from Nowhere"
1997	Vince Gill	"Worlds Apart"
1997	Clint Black	"Like the Rain"
1997	Junior Brown	"My Wife Thinks You're Dead"
1997	Lyle Lovett	"Private Conversation"
1997	Dwight Yoakam	"Nothing"
1998	Vince Gill	"Pretty Little Adriana"
1998	Clint Black	"Something That We Do"
1998	Johnny Cash	"Rusty Cage"
1998	Willie Nelson	"Peach Pickin' Time Down In Georgia"
1998	George Strait	"Carrying Your Love with Me"
1999	Vince Gill	"If You Ever Have Forever in Mind"
1999	Clint Black	"Nothin' but the Taillights"
1999	Garth Brooks	"To Make You Feel My Love"
1999	Steve Wariner	"Holes in the Floor of Heaven"

=== 2000s ===
Year	Artist	Work
2000	George Jones	"Choices"
2000	Vince Gill	"Don't Come Cryin' to Me"
2000	Lyle Lovett	"That's Right (You're Not from Texas)"
2000	Tim McGraw	"Please Remember Me"
2000	Dwight Yoakam	"Crazy Little Thing Called Love"
2001	Johnny Cash	"Solitary Man"
2001	Vince Gill	"Feels Like Love"
2001	Billy Gilman	"One Voice"
2001	Tim McGraw	"My Best Friend"
2001	Dwight Yoakam	"A Thousand Miles from Nowhere" (Live)
2002	Ralph Stanley	"O Death"
2002	Ryan Adams	"Lovesick Blues"
2002	Johnny Cash	"I Dreamed About Mama Last Night"
2002	Lyle Lovett	"San Antonio Girl"
2002	Tim McGraw	"Grown Men Don't Cry"
2002	Willie Nelson	"Maria (Shut Up and Kiss Me)"
2003	Johnny Cash	"Give My Love to Rose"
2003	Pat Green	"Three Days"
2003	Alan Jackson	"Where Were You (When the World Stopped Turning)"
2003	Joe Nichols	"The Impossible"
2003	Brad Paisley	"I'm Gonna Miss Her"
2004	Vince Gill	"Next Big Thing"
2004	Ray Benson	"Annabelle"
2004	Lyle Lovett	"My Baby Don't Tolerate"
2004	Tim McGraw	"She's My Kind of Rain"
2004	Joe Nichols	"Brokenheartsville"
2004	Randy Travis	"Three Wooden Crosses"
2005	Tim McGraw	"Live Like You Were Dying"
2005	Johnny Cash	"Engine One-Forty-Three"
2005	Lyle Lovett	"In My Own Mind"
2005	Willie Nelson	"You Are My Flower"
2005	Keith Urban	"You'll Think of Me"
2006	Keith Urban	"You'll Think of Me"
2006	George Jones	"Funny How Time Slips Away"
2006	Toby Keith	"As Good as I Once Was"
2006	Delbert McClinton	"Midnight Communion"
2006	Willie Nelson	"Good Ol' Boys"
2006	Brad Paisley	"Alcohol"
2007	Vince Gill	"The Reason Why"
2007	Dierks Bentley	"Every Mile a Memory"
2007	George Strait	"The Seashores of Old Mexico"
2007	Josh Turner	"Would You Go with Me"
2007	Keith Urban	"Once in a Lifetime"
2008	Keith Urban	"Stupid Boy"
2008	Dierks Bentley	"Long Trip Alone"
2008	Alan Jackson	"A Woman's Love"
2008	Tim McGraw	"If You're Reading This"
2008	George Strait	"Give It Away"
2009	Brad Paisley	"Letter to Me"
2009	Trace Adkins	"You're Gonna Miss This"
2009	Jamey Johnson	"In Color"
2009	James Otto	"Just Got Started Lovin' You"
2009	George Strait	"Troubadour"

=== 2010s ===
Year	Artist	Work
2010	Keith Urban	"Sweet Thing"
2010	Trace Adkins	"All I Ask for Anymore"
2010	Billy Currington	"People Are Crazy"
2010	Jamey Johnson	"High Cost of Living"
2010	George Strait	"Living for the Night"
2011	Keith Urban	"'Til Summer Comes Around"
2011	Jamey Johnson	"Macon"
2011	Toby Keith	"Cryin' for Me (Wayman's Song)"
2011	David Nail	"Turning Home"
2011	Chris Young	"Gettin' You Home (The Black Dress Song)"

== Multiple wins ==
9 wins

- Vince Gill

5 wins

- Ronnie Milsap

4 wins

- Johnny Cash
- Keith Urban

3 wins

- Willie Nelson

2 wins

- George Jones
- Roger Miller
- Kenny Rogers
- Randy Travis

== Multiple nominations ==
13 nominations

- Willie Nelson

12 nominations

- Vince Gill

10 nominations

- Dwight Yoakam

9 nominations

- Johnny Cash
- Ronnie Milsap
- Charley Pride

7 nominations

- Lyle Lovett
- Randy Travis

6 nominations

- Waylon Jennings
- Tim McGraw
- George Strait
- Keith Urban

5 nominations

- Garth Brooks
- Alan Jackson
- George Jones
- Kenny Rogers

4 nominations

- Clint Black
- Glen Campbell
- Jerry Reed
- Hank Williams Jr.

3 nominations

- Lee Greenwood
- Merle Haggard
- Jamey Johnson
- Roger Miller
- Brad Paisley
- Eddie Rabbitt

2 nominations

- Trace Adkins
- Bobby Bare
- Dierks Bentley
- John Berry
- Rodney Crowell
- Steve Earle
- Larry Gatlin
- Jack Greene
- Toby Keith
- John Michael Montgomery
- Joe Nichols
- Johnny Paycheck
- Ray Price
- Jim Reeves
- Charlie Rich
- Travis Tritt
- Porter Wagoner

== See also ==
- Grammy Award for Best Female Country Vocal Performance
- Grammy Award for Best Country Solo Performance
