= 1993 Country Music Association Awards =

Annual US music awards ceremony

- Date: September 29, 1993
- Location: Grand Ole Opry House, Nashville, Tennessee
- Hosted by: Clint Black; Vince Gill
- Most wins: Vince Gill (5)
- Most nominations: Vince Gill (8)

Television/radio coverage
- Network: CBS

The 1993 Country Music Association Awards, 27th Ceremony, was held on September 29, 1993 at the Grand Ole Opry House, Nashville, Tennessee, and was hosted by CMA Award Winners, Clint Black and Vince Gill.

== Winners and nominees ==
Winner are in Bold.

Entertainer of the Year	Album of the Year
**Vince Gill**; Brooks & Dunn; Garth Brooks; Alan Jackson; Reba McEntire	**I Still Believe in You — Vince Gill**; A Lot About Livin' (And a Little 'bout Love) — Alan Jackson; Come On Come On — Mary Chapin Carpenter; Hard Workin' Man — Brooks & Dunn; The Chase — Garth Brooks
Male Vocalist of the Year	Female Vocalist of the Year
**Vince Gill**; John Anderson; Garth Brooks; Alan Jackson; George Strait	**Mary Chapin Carpenter**; Reba McEntire; Pam Tillis; Tanya Tucker; Wynonna
Vocal Group of the Year	Vocal Duo of the Year
**Diamond Rio**; Alabama; Confederate Railroad; Restless Heart; Sawyer Brown	**Brooks & Dunn**; Bellamy Brothers; Darryl & Don Ellis; Sweethearts of the Rodeo
Single of the Year	Song of the Year
**"Chattahoochee" — Alan Jackson**; "Ain't That Lonely Yet" — Dwight Yoakam; "Don't Let Our Love Start Slippin' Away" — Vince Gill; "I Don't Need Your Rockin' Chair" — George Jones; "Two Sparrows in a Hurricane" — Tanya Tucker	**"I Still Believe in You" — Vince Gill and John Barlow Jarvis**; "Ain't That Lonely Yet" — James House and Kostas; "Boot Scootin' Boogie" — Ronnie Dunn; "Chattahoochee" — Alan Jackson and Jim McBride; "Seminole Wind" — John Anderson
Horizon Award	Musician of the Year
**Mark Chesnutt**; Sammy Kershaw; Tracy Lawrence; John Michael Montgomery; Trisha Yearwood	**Mark O'Connor**; John Barlow Jarvis; Paul Franklin; Brent Mason; Matt Rollings
Music Video of the Year	Vocal Event of the Year
**Chattahoochee — Alan Jackson**; Cleopatra, Queen of Denial — Pam Tillis; Don't Let Our Love Start Slippin' Away — Vince Gill; I Don't Need Your Rockin' Chair — George Jones; Seminole Wind — John Anderson	**I Don't Need Your Rockin' Chair — George Jones with Various Artists**; A Bad Goodbye — Clint Black and Wynonna; Tell Me About It — Tanya Tucker and Delbert McClinton; The Heart Won't Lie — Reba McEntire and Vince Gill; Walkaway Joe — Trisha Yearwood and Don Henley

== Performers ==
Performer(s)	Song(s)
Clint Black; Vince Gill	"Honky Tonk Blues"
Reba McEntire; Linda Davis	"Does He Love You"
Dwight Yoakam	"Fast as You"
Wynonna	"Is It Over Yet"
Clint Black	"Tuckered Out"
Tanya Tucker	"Soon"
Garth Brooks	"American Honky—Tonk Bar Association"
Sawyer Brown	"Thank God for You"
Mary Chapin Carpenter; Trisha Yearwood; Suzy Bogguss; Kathy Mattea; Patty Loveless	"He Thinks He'll Keep Her"
Brooks & Dunn	"She Used to Be Mine"
Pam Tillis	"'Til All The Lonely's Gone"
Billy Ray Cyrus	"Somebody New"
Marty Stuart; Lee Roy Parnell; Musician of the Year nominees	"Workin' Man Blues"
Alan Jackson	"Chattahoochee"
John Michael Montgomery; Trisha Yearwood; Mark Chesnutt; Sammy Kershaw; Tracy Lawrence	Horizon Award Medley "I Love the Way You Love Me" "The Song Remembers When" "It Sure Is Monday" "Haunted Heart" "Can't Break It to My Heart"
George Jones	"Hello Darlin'"
John Anderson	"Seminole Wind"
Vince Gill	"Nothing Like a Woman"
Dolly Parton; Tammy Wynette; Loretta Lynn	"Silver Threads and Golden Needles

== Presenters ==
Presenter(s)	Notes
Patty Loveless; Billy Dean	Song of the Year
Michelle Wright; Joe Diffie	Vocal Duo of the Year
Kelly Willis; Doug Stone	Vocal Group of the Year
Shelby Lynne; Steve Wariner	Vocal Event of the Year
K. T. Oslin	Album of the Year
Sawyer Brown	Single of the Year
Billy Ray Cyrus	Female Vocalist of the Year
Johnny Cash; Rip Torn; Kris Kristofferson	Presented Country Music Hall of Fame Induction of Willie Nelson
Marty Stuart	Musician of the Year
Naomi Judd	Male Vocalist of the Year
Ricky Skaggs; Suzy Bogguss	Horizon Award
Carlene Carter; Aaron Tippin	Video of the Year
Dolly Parton; Tammy Wynette; Loretta Lynn	Entertainer of the Year

== Hall of Fame ==
Country Music Hall of Fame Inductees
- Willie Nelson
