= I Still Believe in You (album) =

Studio album by Vince Gill
- Released: September 1, 1992
- Recorded: 1991–1992
- Studio: Masterfonics and Sound Stage Studios (Nashville, Tennessee)
- Genre: Country
- Length: 36:06
- Label: MCA Nashville
- Producer: Tony Brown

Vince Gill chronology
Pocket Full of Gold (1991)	I Still Believe in You (1992)	Let There Be Peace on Earth (1993)

Singles from I Still Believe in You
- 1. "I Still Believe in You" Released: June 29, 1992; 2. "Don't Let Our Love Start Slippin' Away" Released: October 12, 1992; 3. "No Future in the Past" Released: March 29, 1993; 4. "One More Last Chance" Released: July 26, 1993; 5. "Tryin' to Get Over You" Released: January 3, 1994

Professional ratings
Review scores
Source	Rating
AllMusic	link
Calgary Herald	C−
Chicago Tribune	link
Robert Christgau	C+ link
Entertainment Weekly	A link
Los Angeles Times	link
Q	link

I Still Believe in You is the fifth studio album from American country music artist Vince Gill. It was released in 1992 on MCA Nashville. It features the singles "I Still Believe in You" (Gill's first Number One country hit), "Don't Let Our Love Start Slippin' Away", "No Future in the Past," "One More Last Chance" and "Tryin' to Get Over You."

== Track listing ==
No.	Title	Writer(s)	Length
1.	"Don't Let Our Love Start Slippin' Away"	Vince Gill; Pete Wasner	3:43
2.	"No Future in the Past"	Gill; Carl Jackson	4:08
3.	"Nothing Like a Woman"	Gill; Reed Nielsen	4:54
4.	"Tryin' to Get Over You"	Gill	3:43
5.	"Say Hello"	Gill; Wasner	2:46
6.	"One More Last Chance"	Gill; Gary Nicholson	3:10
7.	"Under These Conditions"	Gill; Max D. Barnes	3:04
8.	"Pretty Words"	Gill; Don Schlitz	2:31
9.	"Love Never Broke Anyone's Heart"	Gill; Jim Weatherly	4:10
10.	"I Still Believe in You"	Gill; John Barlow Jarvis	3:59
Total length:			36:06

Track listing (European version)

1. "I Still Believe in You" - 3:59
2. "Never Alone" (Rosanne Cash, Gill) - 3:34 ^{1}
3. "Nothing Like a Woman" - 4:54
4. "What's a Man to Do" (Curtis Wright) - 3:11 ^{2}
5. "Don't Let Our Love Start Slippin' Away" - 3:43
6. "Never Knew Lonely" (Gill) - 3:59 ^{1}
7. "Say Hello" - 2:46
8. "One More Last Chance" - 3:10
9. "Under These Conditions" - 3:04
10. "Pretty Words" - 2:31
11. "Love Never Broke Anyone's Heart" - 4:10
12. "Tryin' to Get Over You" - 3:43
13. "We Could Have Been" (Don Cook, Jarvis) - 3:29 ^{1}
14. "No Future in the Past" - 4:08
15. "Liza Jane" (Gill, Nielsen) - 2:53 ^{2}

^{1} Originally released on When I Call Your Name

^{2} Originally released on Pocket Full of Gold

== Personnel ==
- Vince Gill – lead vocals, backing vocals, acoustic lead guitar, electric lead guitar
- John Barlow Jarvis – keyboards
- Pete Wasner – keyboards
- Steve Nathan – Hammond B3 organ
- Richard Bennett – acoustic guitar
- Randy Scruggs – acoustic guitar
- Steuart Smith – electric guitar
- John Hughey – steel guitar
- Willie Weeks – bass
- Carlos Vega – drums
- Delbert McClinton – harmonica
- Andrea Zonn – fiddle, backing vocals
- Bob Bailey – backing vocals
- Kim Fleming – backing vocals
- Vicki Hampton – backing vocals
- Yvonne Hodges – backing vocals
- Alison Krauss – backing vocals
- Lou Reed – backing vocals (7)
- Dawn Sears – backing vocals
- Harry Stinson – backing vocals
- Billy Thomas – backing vocals

== Production ==
- Tony Brown – producer
- John Guess – recording, overdub recording, mixing
- Russ Martin – overdub recording, second engineer
- Marty Williams – overdub recording
- Craig White – second engineer
- Milan Bodgan – digital editing
- Glenn Meadows – mastering
- Jessie Noble – project coordinator
- Jim Kemp – creative director
- Katherine DeVault – art direction, design
- Victoria Pearson Cameron – photography
- Jill Sokolec – stylist
- Fitzgerald Hartley Co. – management

== Chart performance ==
=== Weekly charts ===
Chart (1992)	Peak position
Canadian Albums (RPM)	45
Canadian Country Albums (RPM)	3
US Billboard 200	10
US Top Country Albums (Billboard)	3

=== Year-end charts ===
Chart (1992)	Position
US Top Country Albums (Billboard)	22
Chart (1993)	Position
US Billboard 200	43
US Top Country Albums (Billboard)	8
Chart (1994)	Position
US Billboard 200	95
US Top Country Albums (Billboard)	13
Chart (1995)	Position
US Top Country Albums (Billboard)	72

== Certifications and sales ==
=== Album release ===
Region	Certification	Certified units/sales
Canada (Music Canada)	3× Platinum	300,000^{^}
United States (RIAA)	5× Platinum	5,000,000^{^}
^{^} Shipments figures based on certification alone.

=== DVD disc ===
Region	Certification	Certified units/sales
United States (RIAA)	Platinum	100,000^{^}
^{^} Shipments figures based on certification alone.
