= Liza Jane =

Liza Jane may refer to:

- "Li'l Liza Jane", a traditional song
- "Liza Jane" (David Bowie song)
- "Liza Jane" (Vince Gill song)
