= Carolyn Beug =

American filmmaker and producer (1952-2001)

- Born: December 11, 1952; Phoenixville, Pennsylvania, USA
- Died: September 11, 2001 (aged 48); North Tower, World Trade Center, New York City, U.S.
- Cause of death: Plane crash during the September 11 attacks
- Occupations: Filmmaker and video producer
- Spouse: John Beug
- Children: 3
- Parent: Mary Alice Wahlstrom (Mother)

Carolyn Ann Mayer-Beug (née Wahlstrom; December 11, 1952 – September 11, 2001) was an American filmmaker and video producer from Santa Monica, California. She died in the September 11 attacks as a passenger on American Airlines Flight 11.

== Career ==
In addition to her work as video producer, Beug also directed three music videos for country singer Dwight Yoakam: "Ain't That Lonely Yet", "A Thousand Miles from Nowhere" and "Fast as You." Beug co-directed the former two videos with Yoakam and was the sole director of the latter video. She won an MTV Video Music award for the Van Halen music video of the song "Right Now", which she produced. She also served as senior vice president of Walt Disney Records.

== Personal life ==
Beug lived in a Tudor-style home in the North 25th Street neighborhood. She hosted an annual backyard barbecue for the Santa Monica High School cross country and track team, which her daughters captained. Beug was a Latter-day Saint.

== Death and legacy ==
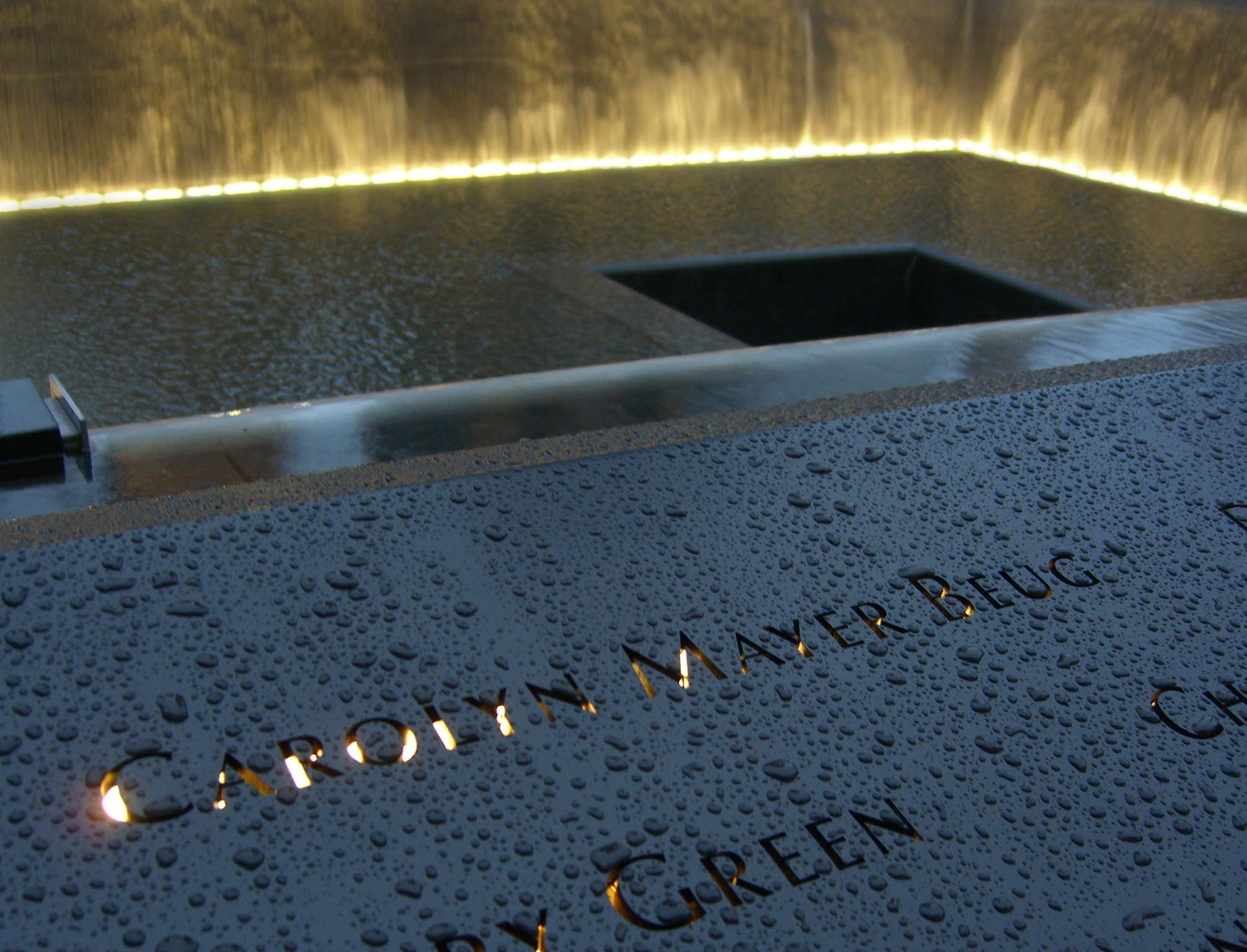
Beug's name is located on Panel N-1 of the National September 11 Memorial’s North Pool, with those of other passengers of Flight 11.

Beug was killed at the age of 48 in the crash of American Airlines Flight 11 in the September 11 attacks. At the time of her death, she was working on a children's book about Noah's Ark, which was to be told from Noah's wife's point of view. Neither the book nor its drafts were ever released. On the plane with her was her mother, Mary Alice Wahlstrom, who perished with her.

The remains of Beug and her mother were never recovered from Ground Zero. Beug was survived by her twin eighteen-year-old daughters Lauren and Lindsey Mayer-Beug, her 13-year-old son, Nick, and her husband, John Beug, a senior vice president in charge of filmed production for Warner Brothers' record division. She was returning home from taking her daughters to college at the Rhode Island School of Design.

At the National September 11 Memorial, Beug is memorialized at the North Pool, on Panel N-1.
