= Try Not to Look So Pretty =

Single by Dwight Yoakam

from the album This Time
- B-side: "Wild Ride"
- Released: February 14, 1994
- Recorded: 1993
- Genre: Country
- Length: 2:52
- Label: Reprise 18341
- Songwriters: Dwight Yoakam, Kostas
- Producer: Pete Anderson

Dwight Yoakam singles chronology
"Fast as You" (1993)	"Try Not to Look So Pretty" (1994)	"Pocket of a Clown" (1994)

"Try Not to Look So Pretty" is a song co-written and recorded by American country music artist Dwight Yoakam. It was released in February 1994 as the fourth single from his album This Time. The song peaked at number 14 in the United States and at number 4 in Canada. It was written by Yoakam and Kostas.

== Music video ==
The music video was directed Gregory R. Alosio with help from Dwight Yoakam.

== Chart performance ==
"Try Not to Look So Pretty" debuted at number 74 on the U.S. Billboard Hot Country Singles & Tracks for the week of February 19, 1994.

Chart (1994)	Peak position
Canada Country Singles (RPM)	4
US Hot Country Songs (Billboard)	14

=== Year-end charts ===
Chart (1994)	Position
Canada Country Tracks (RPM)	36
