= Brown's Diner Bar =

EP by Vince Gill
- Released: January 9, 2026
- Genre: Country
- Length: 25:12
- Label: MCA Nashville
- Producers: Tony Brown; Vince Gill

Vince Gill chronology
| Secondhand Smoke (2025) | Brown's Diner Bar (2026) | Down at the Borderline (2026) |

50 Years from Home: Brown's Diner Bar is the fourth extended play by American singer-songwriter Vince Gill. It was released on January 9, 2026, through MCA Nashville.

The EP is the third installment in Gill's 12-month 50 Years from Home project, where he will release one EP per month for one year. The series is Gill's attempt to allow fans to revisit "the music, memories, and moments that shaped his career."

== Background ==
Brown's Diner Bar is Gill's third release in his 50 Years from Home EP series, following two in 2025, I Gave You Everything I Had and Secondhand Smoke. The album was released on January 9, 2026, shortly after Gill was presented with the Willie Nelson Lifetime Achievement Award by George Strait during the 59th Annual Country Music Association Awards.

The songs for the EP were written in late 2025, after Jody Williams, someone whom Gill had signed a writer/publisher management agreement with in 2021, became his manager. Gill credits Williams for sparking the writing sessions that led to the EPs, stating that he had composed around 150 songs and wanted to release new music every week, but was eventually convinced by MCA to release an EP each month instead.

The EP's title, Brown's Diner Bar, is a reference to the burger restaurant in Nashville, Tennessee, of the same name, which Gill first visited 50 years prior.

When describing the song, Gill said:

"It's a singer-songwriter kind of folk song about...this little hamburger joint. It's been in Nashville for 100 years now, and I've been going for 50. When I made my first trip to Nashville in the mid-70s I remember going to Brown's for a cheeseburger; they're famous for being really good cheeseburgers. It's a funky little joint, close to Music Row, so tons of singers and songwriters and musicians turn up there. It's just a great vibe."

Brown's Diner Bar saw Gill collaborate with co-writers Leslie Satcher, Wade Bowen, Waylon Payne, Ernest, and Jake Worthington on new tracks, along with a re-release of his 1990 number two single "When I Call Your Name" that Gill co-wrote alongside Tim DuBois. The collaborations with other artists highlight Gill's new creative connections.

== Track listing ==
All tracks are written by Vince Gill, with additional co-writers as noted. All tracks are produced by Gill except When I Call Your Name, which was produced by Tony Brown.

50 Years from Home: Brown's Diner Bar track listing
| No. | Title | Writer(s) | Length |
|---|---|---|---|
| 1. | "Brown's Diner Bar" | | 3:16 |
| 2. | "Not Having You Around" | Leslie Satcher | 3:16 |
| 3. | "This Lonesome Old Cowboy" | Wade Bowen | 3:06 |
| 4. | "Nobody Knows" | Waylon Payne | 4:24 |
| 5. | "Young Again" | | 3:50 |
| 6. | "I'm Selling All My Memories" | Ernest Keith Smith; Jake Worthington | 3:05 |
| 7. | "When I Call Your Name" | Tim DuBois | 4:15 |
| Total length: | | | 25:12 |

== Personnel ==
Credits are adapted from Tidal.

=== Musicians ===
- Vince Gill – lead vocals (all tracks), acoustic guitar (tracks 1–6), background vocals (1–3, 5, 6), electric guitar (1), guitar (7)
- Gordon Mote – Wurlitzer piano (tracks 1, 3, 4, 6), piano (2, 5)
- Fred Eltringham – drums, percussion (tracks 1–6)
- Jimmie Lee Sloas – bass (tracks 1–6)
- Jack Schneider – acoustic guitar (track 1)
- Tom Bukovac – electric guitar (tracks 1–4, 6)
- Jedd Hughes – electric guitar (tracks 1, 2, 5, 6), acoustic guitar (3, 4)
- John Barlow Jarvis – Hammond organ (tracks 1, 4), organ (2, 3, 5), piano (6)
- Paul Franklin – steel guitar (all tracks)
- Corrina Gill – background vocals (track 4)
- Patty Loveless – background vocals (track 7)
- Barry Beckett – piano (track 7)
- Eddie Bayers – drums (track 7)
- Willie Weeks – bass (track 7)

=== Technical ===
- Vince Gill – production (tracks 1–6)
- Tony Brown – production (track 7)
- Matt Rausch – recording, assistant mixing (tracks 1–6)
- Justin Niebank – mixing, recording (tracks 1–6)
- Drew Bollman – assistant mixing (tracks 1–6)
- Nathan Dantzler – mastering (tracks 1–6)
- Harrison Tate – mastering (tracks 1–6)
- Michael Romanowski – immersive mastering (tracks 1–6)
- Chuck Ainlay – immersive mixing (tracks 1–6)
- John Guess – recording (track 7)
- Steve Marcantonio – mixing (track 7)
- Glenn Meadows – mastering (track 7)
- Steve Tillisch – overdub engineer (track 7)
