= Everybody's Sweetheart (song) =

Single by Vince Gill

from the album The Way Back Home
- B-side: "The Way Back Home"
- Released: January 30, 1988
- Genre: Country
- Length: 2:49
- Label: RCA Nashville
- Songwriter(s): Vince Gill
- Producer(s): Richard Landis

Vince Gill singles chronology
"Let's Do Something" (1987)	"Everybody's Sweetheart" (1988)	"The Radio" (1988)

"Everybody's Sweetheart" is a song written and recorded by American country music artist Vince Gill. It was released in January 1988 as the third single from the album The Way Back Home. The song reached #11 on the Billboard Hot Country Singles & Tracks chart.

== Content ==
The song is a comedic look at Gill's relationship with his then-wife Janis Gill, who at the time was one-half of the duo Sweethearts of the Rodeo. This duo also provided backing vocals on the corresponding album. In the book For the Music: The Vince Gill Story, Jo Sgammato describes the song as "an ode to being in love with someone who's famous and on the road."

== Chart performance ==
Chart (1988)	Peak position
US Hot Country Songs (Billboard)	11
Canadian RPM Country Tracks	3
