= Greg Trooper =

American singer-songwriter

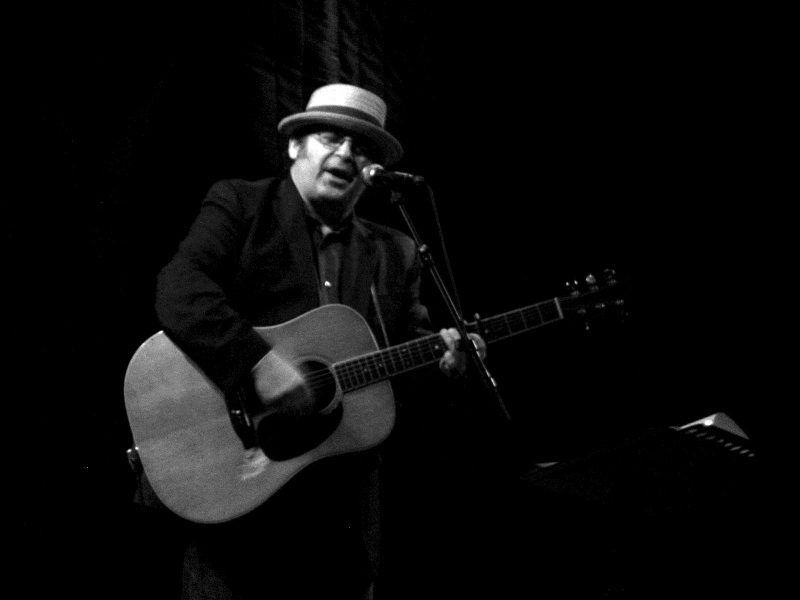
- Greg Trooper at Paradiso, Amsterdam, Netherlands

Background information
- Born: January 13, 1956
- Origin: Neptune, New Jersey, US
- Died: January 15, 2017 (aged 61)
- Genres: Americana, alternative country, folk-rock, folk
- Occupations: Musician, singer-songwriter
- Instruments: Acoustic guitar, mandolin, harmonica, piano, vocals
- Years active: 1992–2017
- Labels: D'Ville Record Group; Koch Records; Eminent Records; Sugar Hill Records; 52 Shakes Records
- Website: gregtrooper.com

Greg Trooper (January 13, 1956 – January 15, 2017) was an American singer-songwriter, whose songs have been recorded by many artists, including Steve Earle, Billy Bragg, and Vince Gill.

== Early life, family and education ==
Trooper was born in Neptune Township, New Jersey, and raised in nearby Little Silver. He received his first guitar when he was a junior high school student. As a teenager in the early 1970s, Trooper would frequent the folk clubs of Greenwich Village, Manhattan, New York City, absorbing the burgeoning singer/songwriter and blues scene. In 1976, he moved to Austin, Texas, and then to Lawrence, Kansas, where he worked at a record store and the University of Kansas and attended classes as he also continued honing his guitar, singing, and songwriting skills.

== Career ==
While living in Kansas, Trooper performed at clubs, often with a set list heavy with Van Morrison songs. In 1980, he moved to New York City where he formed The Greg Trooper Band in 1986 along with Larry Campbell on guitar, Greg Shirley on bass, and Walter Thomson on drums. During this time he recorded his first two records: We Won't Dance on Wild Twin Records in 1986, and the critically acclaimed Everywhere produced by Stewart Lerman. The title track to Everywhere would later be covered by Billy Bragg on the 1991 album Don't Try This at Home. He also met songwriter/publisher Earl Shuman, who secured Trooper's first publishing deal with CBS Songs. Trooper's records caught the attention of Steve Earle, who recorded Trooper's "Little Sister". Vince Gill recorded Trooper's "We Won't Dance" on his 1989 release When I Call Your Name.

In the early 1990s, Trooper met fellow New Jerseyite and E Street Band bassist Garry Tallent who, like Trooper, would move to Nashville, Tennessee. Tallent produced Trooper's 1996 album Noises in the Hallway and released it on his D'Ville Record Group label. Popular Demons followed in 1998, on Koch Records and produced by Buddy Miller. After the release of that album, Trooper signed with Nashville indie Eminent Records, which released Straight Down Rain in 2001.

2002 saw the release of Trooper's first live record, Between A House and a Hard Place – Live at Pine Hill Farm, with Eric "Roscoe" Ambel at the controls. He moved on to the Sugar Hill Records label in 2003 with the release of Floating followed by the Dan Penn-produced Make It Through This World in 2005. Back Shop Live, another live recording, was released in 2006.

In 2008, Trooper moved back to New York City and in 2009 issued his previously unreleased 1995 recording The Williamsburg Affair. In 2011, he released Upside-Down Town on 52 Shakes Records. In August 2013, Trooper released his album Incident on Willow Street, also on 52 Shakes Records. According to Trooper, "In these songs, there seemed to be characters that were trying to break away from a bad situation into a better situation or trying to grow out of a stale and stagnant life into a richer life."

== Personal life and demise ==
Trooper resided in New York City and Nashville, Tennessee, as well as Texas and Kansas. He had been married to Clair Mulally, an attorney, and he had a son, Jack.

Trooper died of pancreatic cancer on January 15, 2017, two days after his 61st birthday.

== Discography ==
- We Won't Dance (as The Greg Trooper Band) (1986)
- Everywhere (1992)
- Noises in the Hallway (1996)
- Popular Demons (1998)
- Straight Down Rain (2001)
- Between A House and a Hard Place: Live At Pine Hill Farm (2002)
- Floating (2003)
- Make It Through This World (2005)
- The BackShop Live (2006)
- The Williamsburg Affair (2009)
- Upside-Down Town (2010)
- Incident On Willow Street (2013)
- Live at the Rock Room (2015)
