= Oklahoma Swing =

Single by Vince Gill with Reba McEntire

from the album When I Call Your Name
- B-side: "We Could Have Been"
- Released: January 20, 1990
- Genre: Country, Western swing
- Length: 3:08
- Label: MCA
- Songwriters: Vince Gill, Tim DuBois
- Producer: Tony Brown

Vince Gill singles chronology
| "Never Alone" (1989) | "Oklahoma Swing" (1990) | "When I Call Your Name" (1990) |

Reba McEntire singles chronology
| "Little Girl" (1989) | "Oklahoma Swing" (1990) | "Walk On" (1990) |

"Oklahoma Swing" is a song recorded by American country music artists Vince Gill and Reba McEntire. It was released in January 1990 as the second single from Gill's album When I Call Your Name. The song reached number 13 on the Billboard Hot Country Singles & Tracks chart. It was written by Gill and Tim DuBois.

== Critical reception ==
Thom Jurek of Allmusic called the song a "smoking Western swing duet".

== Chart performance ==
| Chart (1990) | Peak position |
|---|---|
| Canada Country Singles (RPM) | 7 |
| US Hot Country Songs (Billboard) | 13 |
