= Geraldine (2000 film) =

2000 film by Arthur de Pins

- Directed by: Arthur de Pins
- Written by: Arthur de Pins
- Starring: Anne Charlotte Guillot; Camille Serceau
- Music by: Esteban
- Production company: ENSAD
- Distributed by: Metronomic
- Release date: 2000
- Running time: 9 minutes
- Country: France

Geraldine is a 2000 French animated short film, directed by Arthur de Pins, while he was attending Arts Decos'. Critical reception has been positive, and the film has been honored in multiple festivals. The story follows a former man who must adjust to her new life after inexplicably waking up one morning as a woman. In 2004, the film was released on a DVD compilation of French animated short films.

== Plot ==
Geraldine wakes up with a loud shriek. She had gone to bed as a man named Gerald. Somehow, overnight, she has undergone a mysterious transformation. Now an attractive woman, Geraldine abashedly looks over her new body. She seeks help from a medical professional, but her story is not taken seriously. The next morning Geraldine calls up an old girlfriend, Penelope, who agrees to meet. While waiting in a park, Geraldine draws unwanted attention from a group of men playing soccer. Resenting this, she attempts to display her own athleticism, but embarrasses herself.

Struggling to assume her new role in life, Geraldine learns the many facets of womanhood from her former girlfriend, while continuing to fend off male advances. The two friends go to a nightclub together, and Geraldine attends therapy sessions. Although beginning to become more comfortable in her femininity, she has to endure horny, leering men in her corporate office. Upon being sexually harassed by her boss, she headbutts him.

The old girlfriend is startled and upset to discover that Geraldine has taken a new modeling job. Geraldine does extraordinarily well in this profession however, attaining worldwide fame. She appears on the cover of renowned publications and channels her celebrity-status into political influence. After many years, Geraldine has decided to marry a man. Her old girlfriend rushes her to the ceremony, driving a motorcycle. As Geraldine reaches the end of the church aisle, a storm gathers overhead. Lightning strikes, and Geraldine transforms back into a man. Upon seeing the bearded Gerald, everyone gasps. Still wearing his wedding dress, Gerald feels his body and lets out a loud scream. Leaving the ceremony together, Gerald and his old girlfriend reconnect as a couple and eventually start a large family.

== Production ==
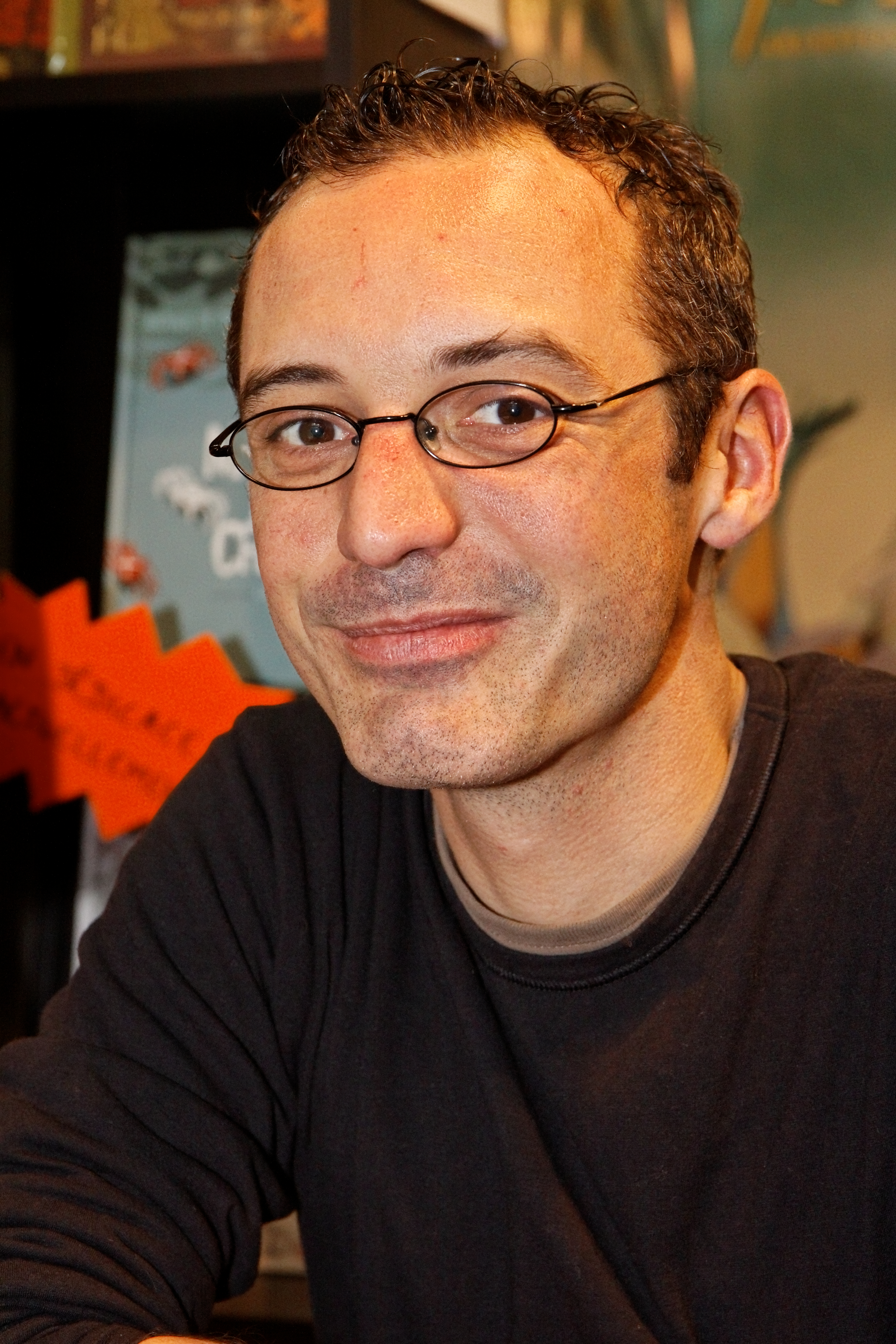
Director Arthur de Pins

Arthur de Pins made Geraldine while attending Arts Decos' in Paris. According to Campaign, many viewers have had strong and differing reactions to the film, some accusing it of sexism, others hailing it as feminist. de Pins however, who has no sisters and attended an all boys school in his youth, was "merely having fun" with the film and exploring his curiosity in the opposite sex. In a review for Short of the Week, Ian Lumsden posited that the film was rendered in Flash and that After Effects was likely used for compositing.

== Reception ==
Amid Amidi of Cartoon Brew and independent animator Celia Bullwinkel have both expressed affinity for the film. Ron Diamond of Shoot singled it out as one of the best films screened at the 2001 Annecy International Animated Film Festival. Writing for Short of the Week, Ian Lumsden called Geraldine a "hilarious romp" and praised de Pins' "febrile wit". Noting the film's simplistic, colorful design, he likened the animation style to "a well-crafted comic postcard". A review in Campaign highlighted the film's visual humor and "spot-on sound effects."

== Accolades ==
The film won in the Undergraduate category at the 2001 Ottawa International Student Animation Festival, the Best School or Graduation Film award at the 2001 Annecy International Animated Film Festival, and the Video Prize at the 2001 Avanca Film Festival. It was also featured retrospectively in a 2012 travelling European film exhibition by Les Videophages and in the 2013 Torino Gay & Lesbian Film Festival.

== Home media ==
The film was released on DVD in 2004 by Lowave, as part of a compilation titled Metronomic & Co: French animated shorts, volume 1.

== See also ==
- Mister Smile
- Fish Heads Fugue and Other Tales for Twilight
- Le Building
