= Pocket Full of Gold (song) =

Single by Vince Gill

from the album Pocket Full of Gold
- B-side: "A Little Left Over"
- Released: January 1991
- Recorded: 1990
- Genre: Country
- Label: MCA
- Songwriters: Vince Gill, Brian Allsmiller
- Producer: Tony Brown

Vince Gill singles chronology
"Never Knew Lonely" (1990)	"Pocket Full of Gold" (1991)	"Liza Jane" (1991)

"Pocket Full of Gold" is a song co-written and recorded by American country music artist Vince Gill. It was released in January 1991 as the first single and title track from the album Pocket Full of Gold. The song reached number 7 on the Billboard Hot Country Singles & Tracks chart. It was written by Gill and Brian Allsmiller.

== Content ==
"Pocket Full of Gold" is a ballad about a man who commits infidelity and hides his wedding ring in his pocket, an act which later causes misfortune within his life. Throughout the song, he is referred to as a "rich man with his pocket full of gold". Vince Gill took the idea from a song of the same name written by his friend Brian Allsmiller, then a basketball player for Vanderbilt University's college team. According to Gill, Allsmiller would often write his own songs and take them to Gill for feedback. One such song featured the lyric "pocket full of gold", an idea which Gill liked and used as inspiration. Although GIll ultimately wrote the song by himself, he credited Allsmiller as a co-writer.

== Music video ==
The music video was directed by John Lloyd Miller and premiered in early 1991.

== Personnel ==
Compiled from the liner notes.

- Eddie Bayers – drums
- Barry Beckett – piano
- Vince Gill – lead and backing vocals
- John Hughey – steel guitar
- Patty Loveless – backing vocals
- Mac McAnally – acoustic guitar
- Billy Joe Walker Jr. – electric guitar
- Pete Wasner – keyboards
- Willie Weeks – bass guitar

== Chart performance ==
Chart (1991)	Peak position
Canada Country Singles (RPM)	11
US Hot Country Songs (Billboard)	7
