= If It Weren't for Him =

Single by Vince Gill with Rosanne Cash

from the album The Things That Matter
- B-side: "Savannah (Do You Ever Think of Me)"
- Released: June 24, 1985
- Genre: Country
- Length: 3:29
- Label: RCA Nashville
- Songwriter(s): Vince Gill, Rosanne Cash
- Producer(s): Emory Gordy Jr.

Vince Gill singles chronology
| "True Love" (1985) | "If It Weren't for Him" (1985) | "Oklahoma Borderline" (1985) |

Rosanne Cash singles chronology
| "I Don't Know Why You Don't Want Me" (1985) | "If It Weren't for Him" (1985) | "Never Be You" (1985) |

"If It Weren't for Him" is a song written and recorded by American country music artists Vince Gill and Rosanne Cash. It was released in June 1985 as the second single from Gill's first album The Things That Matter. The song reached #10 on the Billboard Hot Country Singles & Tracks chart. This became his first Top 10 Hit on that chart.

== Chart performance ==
| Chart (1985) | Peak position |
|---|---|
| US Hot Country Songs (Billboard) | 10 |
| Canadian RPM Country Tracks | 5 |
