= Turn Me Loose =

Turn Me Loose may refer to:

== Albums ==
- Turn Me Loose (Ledisi album)
- Turn Me Loose (EP), by Vince Gill, or its title track
- Turn Me Loose, album by Steve Jordan (accordionist), 1986

== Songs ==
- "Turn Me Loose" (Loverboy song), also covered by Young Divas
- "Turn Me Loose" (Fabian song)
- "Turn Me Loose", a song by Rock Goddess from the album Young and Free

== Other uses ==
- Turn Me Loose (horse), a racehorse
