= Take Your Memory with You =

Single by Vince Gill

from the album Pocket Full of Gold
- B-side: "Sparkle"
- Released: January 27, 1992
- Recorded: 1990
- Genre: Country
- Label: MCA
- Songwriter: Vince Gill
- Producer: Tony Brown

Vince Gill singles chronology
"Look at Us" (1991)	"Take Your Memory with You" (1992)	"I Still Believe in You" (1992)

"Take Your Memory with You" is a song written and recorded by American country music artist Vince Gill. It was released in January 1992 as the fourth single from the album Pocket Full of Gold. The song reached number 2 on the Billboard Hot Country Singles & Tracks chart.

== Personnel ==
Compiled from the liner notes.

- Larry Byrom – electric guitar
- Vince Gill – lead vocals, electric guitar
- John Hughey – steel guitar
- Larrie Londin – drums
- Mac McAnally – acoustic guitar
- Herb Pedersen – backing vocals
- Michael Rhodes – bass guitar
- Hargus "Pig" Robbins – piano
- Andrea Zonn – fiddle

== Chart performance ==
Chart (1992)	Peak position
Canada Country Singles (RPM)	3
US Hot Country Songs (Billboard)	2

=== Year-end charts ===
Chart (1992)	Position
Canada Country Tracks (RPM)	56
US Country Songs (Billboard)	32
