= Fish Heads Fugue and Other Tales for Twilight =

- Directed by: Lauren Indovina; Lindsey Mayer-Beug
- Written by: Lauren Indovina; Lindsey Mayer-Beug
- Production company: Rhode Island School of Design
- Release date: 2005
- Running time: 6 minutes

Fish Heads Fugue and Other Tales for Twilight is a 2005 mixed-media animated short film directed by Lauren Indovina and Lindsey Mayer-Beug while they were attending Rhode Island School of Design. The story depicts a mechanical puppet theater, in which a series of dark and esoteric scenes are displayed. Traditional animation, cut-out animation, computer animation, and puppetry are all used. Critical reception has been favorable, and the film has received accolades from several noted commentators who have singled it out for its juxtaposition of music and evocative visual design.

== Plot ==
An old woman, short and stout, enters a room containing a small puppet theater. Between the tasks of setting up a phonograph and a film projector, she carries in a large object, on top of which stands a statue of a dog. The dog comes to life. Inside the puppet theater, a mechanical platform rises up, revealing a miniature pianist. After a brief musical performance, the theater rotates, displaying an ocean scenescape - amidst other themed props, a fish's head is depicted bobbing up and down in the water. The theater then rotates again, settling on a hilltop home.

Inside the dwelling, sits a porcelain doll in the form of a young girl. A blue, spectral drawing sits with her, until she is roused by a bell. As the girl leaves the room, the wispy drawing looks after her, and then vanishes. A cloaked, pale-faced, old woman watches the young girl climb through the meandering, mechanical passageways of the puppet theater. The old woman signals for a loaf of bread and then passes it on to the young girl.

A lonely red balloon floats down a hallway. It stops to hover by a grotesque couple, gorging themselves on an opulent feast. The couple gaze at each other through richly designed fish masks. The balloon then passes on, reaching a tavern. The pianist is there, and three old men sit enraptured by a woman on stage. The young girl, who has made her way to the room as well, watches as one of the men casually swallows a pair of levitating playing cards.

Following the red balloon, the girl appears to return home. She is encountered however, by a rotating contraption, depicting a series of intricate masks. Her house is revealed to also be such a contraption. The young girl then appears standing alone in the puppet theater. The old woman, who set up the show, is watching. She directs a mechanical fan toward the girl, and the girl, covering her eyes in apparent fear, is blown away. The woman waves goodbye to an unseen audience.

== Production ==
Lauren Indovina and Lindsey Mayer-Beug directed Fish Heads Fugue and Other Tales for Twilight as their thesis film, while attending Rhode Island School of Design. The two classmates, who majored in Film, Animation, and Video intermingled throughout their time at RISD, but did not form a close friendship until attending the Ottawa International Animation Festival together in their senior year. Indovina has described this trip as a "pilgrimage", undertaken annually by RISD animation seniors. In her own words, she and Mayer-Beug bonded over "a mutual belief that getting up early to explore Ottawa is worth sleep deprivation", and while abroad, the two resolved to collaborate on their upcoming thesis film. A year later, they would return to Ottawa, winning top honors in the Undergraduate category with this film.

Production lasted six months. Splitting responsibilities, Indovina handled the set design, modeling, texturing, and lighting, while Mayer-Beug handled the character design. The duo found inspiration in the distinctive style of Czech animator Jan Svankmajer, as well as old puppet shows. In an interview a decade later, Mayer-Beug would note that elderly people with wrinkled faces - a recurring motif in this film - are one of her favorite subjects to draw. Although the film makes use of computer graphics, both directors carry a strong preference for traditional forms of animation, having once made reference to "the tyranny of software". As such, they drew from a wide variety of art disciplines, combining Maya software with cell animation, paint, puppetry (including hand puppetry), cutout animation (both traditional and computer-based), and stop motion. Other aspects of the film's production were achieved through the use of After Effects, Avid, Photoshop, and Pro Tools. The sound design is by Sarah Orenstein.

The film is dedicated to Mayer-Beug's mother, Carolyn Beug, and grandmother, Mary Alice Wahlstrom; both died in the 9/11 terrorist attacks. Carolyn Beug had served as senior vice president of Walt Disney Records in the mid-nineties. She and Wahlstrom boarded American Airlines Flight 11 while returning from taking Lindsey Mayer-Beug and Lindsey's twin sister (also named Lauren) to their first year of college.

== Reception ==
As its gear-driven sets whip and whirl, ideas and visuals cascade, eclipsing one another. This is the kind of film you can watch ten times and see twenty different things.

— A review in 3D World magazine

Melissa Wolfe of Frederator called Fish Heads Fugue and Other Tales for Twilight "beautiful", naming it as a highlight of the 2005 Ottawa International Animation Festival. The film was also singled out for praise by David Fellerath and Zack Smith, both of Indy Week, during the 2006 and 2007 Hi Mom! Film Festivals. Smith called it a "macabre feast for the eyes" that evokes the works of Lemony Snicket, while Fellerath likened the film's "interplay of music, images, and the imagination" to Corpse Bride and The Triplets of Belleville. Irene Gallo of Tor.com wrote that, although the film makes use of CGI, it still manages to exude "all the decay and style" associated with stop motion animation. She felt it particularly reminiscent of Jan Švankmajer's filmography - a key influence on the film's design. In a review for the Reading Eagle, Tony Lucia called the film "As enchanting and technically astonishing as it is cryptic and ambiguous." He pondered the meaning of the film, questioning whether the young girl should be interpreted as a captive or a performer, and likened it to the works of David Lynch. The staff of 3D World magazine referred to the film as a "gothic masterpiece".

Fish Heads Fugue and Other Tales for Twilight won in the Undergraduate category at the 2005 Ottawa International Animation Festival and went on to screen throughout the United States in the Best of Ottawa 2005 travelling exhibition. The film also won in the Stop Motion category at the 2006 Animex Student Animation Awards and the Animation category at the 2005 Hollywood DV Festival, was a semi-finalist at the 2005 Stash DVD Magazine Global Student Animation Awards, and was named by 3D World magazine as one of the ten best student animated films of the year. Other festivals in which it screened include the 2006 Ann Arbor Film Festival, the 2006 Boston Underground Film Festival, the 2005 Etiuda & Anima International Film Festival, the 2006 Florida Film Festival, the 2006 and 2007 Hi Mom! Film Festivals, the 2006 Melbourne International Animation Festival, the 2005 Pawtucket Film Festival, the 2006 Philadelphia Film Festival, the 2006 Reel Women International Film Festival, and the 2006 Seattle International Film Festival. Additionally, it was selected as one of three short films to be screened in June 2006, as part of Slamdance Film Festival's online Anarchy competition.

== See also ==
- Mister Smile
- Geraldine (2000 film)
- Le Building
