= This Time (Dwight Yoakam album) =

Studio album by Dwight Yoakam
- Released: March 23, 1993
- Studio: Capitol Studios (Hollywood)
- Genres: Country; honky tonk
- Length: 41:36
- Label: Reprise
- Producer: Pete Anderson

Dwight Yoakam chronology
If There Was a Way (1990)	This Time (1993)	Dwight Live (1995)

Singles from This Time
- 1. "Ain't That Lonely Yet" Released: March 8, 1993; 2. "A Thousand Miles from Nowhere" Released: June 21, 1993; 3. "Fast as You" Released: October 4, 1993; 4. "Try Not to Look So Pretty" Released: February 14, 1994; 5. "Pocket of a Clown" Released: June 27, 1994

This Time is the fifth studio album by American country music artist Dwight Yoakam, released by Reprise Records on March 23, 1993. Three of its tracks barely missed the top spot on the Billboard Hot Country Singles chart, each peaking at No. 2: "Ain't That Lonely Yet", "A Thousand Miles from Nowhere" and "Fast as You", the latter being his last Top 10 single. Two other tracks also rose into the charts: "Try Not to Look So Pretty" at No. 14 and "Pocket of a Clown" at No. 22. The album itself peaked at No. 4 on the Top Country Albums chart. Yoakam wrote or co-wrote all except for one of the tracks on this album.

== Recording ==
While still rooted in country, This Time sees Yoakam branching out far beyond the honky-tonk sound of his early albums. With production help from Dusty Wakeman, longtime producer and guitarist Pete Anderson was able to add depth and dimension to an already full sound, where the echoes of early rock and soul entwine the honky tonk tempos and instruments and become something wholly other. Anderson later stated the LP was an attempt to fulfill the artistic mission started with the previous album If There Was a Way and create a distinct musical identity:

I wanted to get to a point where we made Dwight Yoakam music. First off, we made country music. We were bound by the constraints of making a good country record…But whatever Johnny Cash was, Johnny Cash made Johnny Cash music. Was it country, was it folk, was it Americana, was it rockabilly? It was Johnny Cash music. And Kenny Rogers, for better or worse, made Kenny Rogers music. I wanted Dwight to be in that stratosphere.

Anderson, who used Pro Tools for the album, also admitted putting "A Thousand Miles from Nowhere" on the album was the biggest decision of all, since it was unlike anything Yoakam had recorded before, and the singer himself admitted to Us in 1993, "Oftentimes we're not doing country music anymore. But that's okay. Country music is not where I'll remain, but it's a place I'll always return to." Although This Time was not a No. 1 country album, nor did it produce any chart-topping singles, it was Yoakam's biggest album, selling triple-platinum and even ranking the Top 25 of the pop charts.

== Composition ==
Yoakam renewed his songwriting collaboration with Kostas, which started on his previous album, composing four of the LP's eleven tracks with him. As AllMusic critic Thom Jurek notes, "...in Kostas, Yoakam found a writer as interested in textures as in unique ways to use his voice. 'Two Doors Down' is a stunning example, as is the lone cover on the disc, by Kostas and James House, 'Ain't That Lonely Yet,' where Yoakam moves into Roy Orbison territory with strings and lush backdrops that meld Bakersfield with Pitney's conceptual mini-soundtracks and the arrangements on Jim Reeves' best records." First single "Ain't That Lonely Yet" is an orchestrated mid-tempo song featuring a string arrangement by Paul Buckmaster, known for his work with Elton John. Yoakam and Kostas also collaborated on the title track, a Buck Owens–inspired groove that Yoakam would introduce in concerts as "psychobilly."

The songs Yoakam wrote on his own showed continued artistic growth, especially on "A Thousand Miles from Nowhere", which Anderson told the Journal of Country Music was "one of the more experimental songs Dwight has ever written," and added that the song's long outro was inspired by "Layla" by Derek and the Dominos. It debuted at No. 72 on the U.S. Billboard Hot Country Singles & Tracks for the week of June 26, 1993, and eventually peaked at No. 2. The music video for the song was co-directed by Yoakam and Carolyn Mayer, and features Yoakam riding on a Copper Basin Railway train across the Arizona desert, and is shown in two frames showing mostly different views of the train and Yoakam; fellow musician Kelly Willis does a cameo appearance as the young woman standing in a shallow stream. Another hit from Yoakam's pen was "Fast as You", which, propelled by its circular "Pretty Woman"-like guitar hook and smoky keyboards, also hit No. 2 on the country singles chart and landed on the Billboard Hot 100, peaking at No. 70 and representing Yoakam's commercial zenith. The remaining originals are rooted in country, with the kitschy "Pocket of a Clown" hearkening back to his earlier cover of Lefty Frizzell's "Always Late with Your Kisses" with its prominent background singers, and "Home for Sale," which utilizes the B3 Hammond organ that was introduced on his previous album.

"A Thousand Miles from Nowhere" was featured as the closing credits music for the film Red Rock West, in which Yoakam also made his film acting debut. "Wild Ride" was later covered by Kenny Chesney as a duet with Joe Walsh on Chesney's 2007 album Just Who I Am: Poets & Pirates.

== Reception ==
Professional ratings
Review scores
Source	Rating
AllMusic	5/5 stars

This Time remains the biggest selling album of Yoakam's career, going triple platinum. Rolling Stone magazine gave the album four stars, while AllMusic awarded This Time five-out-of-five stars. Reviewer Thom Jurek concluded, "This album is a welcome addition to Yoakam's formidable catalog. This Time is no sell out; it's a new way to present the timelessness of hard, torn, wasted-love country love songs with less reckless sentimentality and more honest emotion."

== Track listing ==
All tracks are written by Dwight Yoakam, except where noted.

No.	Title	Writer(s)	Length
1.	"Pocket of a Clown"		2:55
2.	"A Thousand Miles from Nowhere"		4:27
3.	"Home for Sale"		3:35
4.	"This Time"	Yoakam, Kostas	3:58
5.	"Two Doors Down"	Yoakam, Kostas	3:52
6.	"Ain't That Lonely Yet"	Kostas, James House	3:20
7.	"King of Fools"	Yoakam, Kostas	4:05
8.	"Fast as You"		4:45
9.	"Try Not to Look So Pretty"	Yoakam, Kostas	2:52
10.	"Wild Ride"		4:42
11.	"Lonesome Roads"		3:05
Total length:			41:36

== Personnel ==
- Beth Andersen – background vocals
- Pete Anderson – electric guitar
- Chuck Domanico – upright bass
- Jeff Donavan – drums
- Skip Edwards – keyboards
- Tommy Funderburk – background vocals
- Jim Haas – background vocals
- Scott Humphrey – programming
- Carl Jackson – background vocals
- Scott Joss – fiddle
- Jim Lauderdale – background vocals
- Dean Parks – acoustic guitar
- Al Perkins – Dobro, lap steel guitar, pedal steel guitar
- Taras Prodaniuk – bass guitar
- Don Reed – fiddle
- Dwight Yoakam – lead vocals, background vocals, acoustic guitar

Strings conducted and arranged by Paul Buckmaster and contracted by Suzy Katayama.

== Charts ==
=== Weekly charts ===
Chart (1993)	Peak position
Canadian Albums (RPM)	19
Canadian Country Albums (RPM)	1
US Billboard 200	25
US Top Country Albums (Billboard)	4

=== Year-end charts ===
Chart (1993)	Position
US Billboard 200	87
US Top Country Albums (Billboard)	18
Chart (1994)	Position
US Billboard 200	86
US Top Country Albums (Billboard)	14

=== Singles ===
Year	Single	Chart positions		
Year	Single	US Country	US	CAN Country
1993	"Ain't That Lonely Yet"	2	101	1
1993	"A Thousand Miles from Nowhere"	2	—	3
1993	"Fast as You"	2	70	5
1994	"Try Not to Look So Pretty"	14	—	4
1994	"Pocket of a Clown"	22	—	4
"—" denotes releases that did not chart
