= Mister Smile =

- Directed by: Fran Krause
- Written by: Fran Krause; Will Krause
- Starring: Will Krause; Fran Krause
- Production company: MIM Fran Krause
- Release date: 1999
- Running time: 8 minutes
- Country: United States
- Language: English

Mister Smile is a 1999 American animated short film directed by Fran Krause while he was attending Rhode Island School of Design. It won several awards in independent film festivals. The story follows a variety of characters who are all invited to a party at the home of Mister Smile.

== Plot ==
Two men and a bear cower in their tree house home, awaiting the arrival of their newly ordered robot. Meanwhile, a bird drives home to his human wife. That night, he dreams about the childhood moment when he realized that he has fingers instead of wings - a discovery that prompted him to become a salesman. A monkey paces in the waiting room of a nearby hospital, as a chicken is called back to see the doctor. The doctor zaps the chicken with a shrinking machine, and after putting the chicken into a syringe, injects her into the monkey. Around this time, a squirrel and an old man play a game together, within their shared apartment complex. The squirrel removes the old man's dentures and hides them from him. The old man then tries to guess where his dentures are.

In the apartment above the bird-human couple, lives Mister Smile, whose head is a yellow smiley face. Mr. Smile stamps his face onto sheets of paper, causing the features to disappear from his face completely. The features always regenerate though, as he slips the stamped sheets of paper into envelopes. Each group of characters receives one of these envelopes in the mail. They have been invited to visit Mr. Smile, who is presumably a celebrity.

Although the doctor's procedure goes awry, leaving the now normal-sized chicken stuck inside of the monkey's head, all three are delighted to receive their invitation. At the party, Mr. Smile hands out autographs, and the bird explains why he has the words "Love" and "Food" tattooed on his hands. In the bird's estimation, love and food must exist in harmony, for they are the only two things that anyone needs in life. He places the fingers of one of his hands in between the fingers of the other and declares "Flooovde". The end credits inform the audience that the chicken and monkey got married shortly after the end of filming.

== Production ==
Fran Krause made the film while attending Rhode Island School of Design. It took him two semesters to complete the film, during which time he listened to Archers of Loaf songs. Reminiscing a decade later, he remarked, "I was on the 3rd floor of Market House about 20 hours a day painting cels for [the film]". There was a janitor at his school named Mel, who according to Krause, "would sing in a beautiful baritone as he cleaned up around the cafeteria." Krause wanted Mel to voice the bird in his film, but Mel struggled in pronouncing a critical line. Eventually, Krause settled on voicing the character himself. His brother Will voiced the monkey and was the only other actor in the film.

== Critical reception ==
Morgan Miller of Film Threat gave Mister Smile three stars and called it "a very silly cartoon". His review noted the minimalist style of the animation and compared the bird's soliloquy to Robert Mitchum's in The Night of the Hunter. Dan Sarto of Animation World Magazine wrote that the film was a "crowd favorite" at the Ottawa International Student Animation Festival. He appreciated the film and felt that it was a "quirky, funny tale". Both critics praised the humorous ending.

Richard Roeper also saw similarities with Night of the Hunter, writing "Give this animated flick credit for reaching back a bit".

== Accolades ==
The film won First Prize in the Undergraduate/First Year Films category at the 1999 Ottawa International Student Animation Festival, the First Prize Animation Award at the 2000 USA Film Festival, and the Best Animated Film Award at the 24th Annual Atlanta Film & Video Festival. It also screened at the 1999 Chicago International Film Festival and at a Rooftop Films festival.

== See also ==
- Geraldine (2000 film)
- Fish Heads Fugue and Other Tales for Twilight
- Le Building
