= Look at Us (Vince Gill song) =

Single by Vince Gill

from the album Pocket Full of Gold
- B-side: "I Quit"
- Released: September 16, 1991
- Recorded: November 1990; Studio 6 Nashville, Tennessee
- Genre: Country
- Length: 4:00
- Label: MCA
- Songwriters: Vince Gill, Max D. Barnes
- Producer: Tony Brown

Vince Gill singles chronology
"Liza Jane" (1991)	"Look at Us" (1991)	"Take Your Memory with You" (1992)

"Look at Us" is a song co-written and recorded by American country music artist Vince Gill. It was released in September 1991 as the third single from the album Pocket Full of Gold. The song reached number 4 on the Billboard Hot Country Singles & Tracks chart. Gill wrote the song with Max D. Barnes.

== Content ==
"Look at Us" features a pedal steel guitar intro from John Hughey, who was known for his "crying steel" method of playing by using the higher ranges of the instrument. Of this solo, Gill said that it "makes that song recognizable by what happens before any words even get sung."

== Other versions ==
John Prine recorded the song as a duet with Morgane Stapleton as part of his 2016 album For Better, or Worse. Deana Carter also performed a cover to celebrate 50 years of the CMA Awards.

== Music video ==
The music video was directed by John Lloyd Miller and premiered in late 1991. It contains videos and photographs of several long-timed married couples, still in love. The video featured Gill's then wife (Janis Oliver Gill) - they later divorced in 1997.

== Chart performance ==
Chart (1991)	Peak position
Canada Country Singles (RPM)	12
US Hot Country Songs (Billboard)	4
