= Cinderella (Vince Gill song) =

Single by Vince Gill

from the album The Way Back Home
- B-side: "Something's Missing"
- Released: March 1987
- Genre: Country
- Length: 3:33
- Label: RCA Nashville
- Songwriter(s): Reed Nielsen
- Producer(s): Richard Landis

Vince Gill singles chronology
"With You" (1986)	"Cinderella" (1987)	"Let's Do Something" (1987)

"Cinderella" is a song written by Reed Nielsen, and recorded by American country music artist Vince Gill. It was released in March 1987 as the first single from the album The Way Back Home. The song reached #5 on the Billboard Hot Country Singles & Tracks chart.

== Content ==
"Cinderella" is about a male narrator having a conversation with a friend whom he thinks is forcing his girlfriend into a subservient role which the narrator compares to Cinderella. The narrator threatens to "take the girl and treat her like a real person if the friend doesn't change his ways." Gill plays mandolin and banjo on the track, which led him to compare the song to bluegrass music mixed with New Wave music, as well as "a cross between Bill Monroe and the Beatles."

== Chart performance ==
Chart (1987)	Peak posttion
US Hot Country Songs (Billboard)	5
Canadian RPM Country Tracks	3
