= Pocket Full of Gold =

Studio album by Vince Gill
- Released: March 5, 1991
- Recorded: June–July 1990
- Studio: Studio 6 and Masterfonics (Nashville, Tennessee)
- Genre: Country
- Length: 32:04
- Label: MCA Nashville
- Producer: Tony Brown

Vince Gill chronology
When I Call Your Name (1989)	Pocket Full of Gold (1991)	I Still Believe in You (1992)

Singles from Pocket Full of Gold
- 1. "Pocket Full of Gold" Released: January 1991; 2. "Liza Jane" Released: June 3, 1991; 3. "Look at Us" Released: September 16, 1991; 4. "Take Your Memory with You" Released: January 27, 1992

Professional ratings
Review scores
Source	Rating
AllMusic	link
Calgary Herald	B
Chicago Tribune	link
Entertainment Weekly	B− link
Orlando Sentinel	5/5 stars

Pocket Full of Gold is the fourth studio album from American country music artist, Vince Gill. It was released in 1991 on MCA Nashville. It features the singles "Pocket Full of Gold," "Liza Jane," "Look at Us" and "Take Your Memory with You."

== Track listing ==
No.	Title	Writer(s)	Length
1.	"I Quit"	Vince Gill; Max D. Barnes	2:30
2.	"Look at Us"	Gill; Barnes	3:59
3.	"Take Your Memory with You"	Gill	2:34
4.	"Pocket Full of Gold"	Gill; Brian Allsmiller	4:04
5.	"The Strings That Tie You Down"	Gill; Barnes	3:39
6.	"Liza Jane"	Gill; Reed Nielsen	2:53
7.	"If I Didn't Have You in My World"	Gill; Jim Weatherly	3:52
8.	"A Little Left Over"	Gill	2:06
9.	"What's a Man to Do"	T.J. Knight; Curtis Wright	3:11
10.	"Sparkle"	Jim Lauderdale; John Leventhal	3:16
Total length:			32:04

== Production ==
- Tony Brown – producer
- John Guess – recording, overdub recording, mixing
- Marty Williams – overdub recording, second engineer
- Milan Bogdan – digital editing
- Glenn Meadows – mastering
- Jessie Noble – project coordinator
- Katherine DeVault – art direction, design
- Jim "Señor" McGuire – photography
- Larry Fitzgerald at Fitzgerald Hartley Co. – management

== Personnel ==
As listed in the liner notes.

- Vince Gill – lead vocals, electric guitar (1, 3, 5, 6, 8, 9), backing vocals (2, 4, 5, 7–9)
- Barry Beckett – acoustic piano (1, 2, 4, 6, 9)
- Hargus "Pig" Robbins – acoustic piano (2, 3, 5, 7)
- Pete Wasner – keyboards (4–7, 9, 10)
- Mac McAnally – acoustic guitar
- Billy Joe Walker Jr. – electric guitar (1, 2, 4, 6, 9)
- Larry Byrom – electric guitar (3, 5, 7, 10)
- Richard Bennett – electric guitar (10)
- John Hughey – steel guitar (1–5, 7–9)
- Willie Weeks – bass (1, 2, 4, 6, 9)
- Michael Rhodes – bass (3, 5, 7, 8, 10)
- Eddie Bayers – drums (1, 2, 4, 6, 9)
- Larrie Londin – drums (3, 5, 7, 8, 10)
- Andrea Zonn – fiddle (1–3, 5–8, 10), backing vocals (2, 5, 7)
- Herb Pedersen – backing vocals (1, 3, 10)
- Patty Loveless – backing vocals (4)
- Billy Thomas – backing vocals (6, 9)
- Tony King – backing vocals (8)

== Charts ==
=== Weekly charts ===
Chart (1991)	Peak position
US Billboard 200	37
US Top Country Albums (Billboard)	5

=== Year-end charts ===
Chart (1991)	Position
US Top Country Albums (Billboard)	26

== Certifications ==
Region	Certification	Certified units/sales
United States (RIAA)	2× Platinum	2,000,000^{^}
^{^} Shipments figures based on certification alone.
