= Let's Do Something =

Single by Vince Gill

from the album The Way Back Home
- B-side: "It Doesn't Matter Anymore"
- Released: September 19, 1987
- Genre: Country
- Length: 3:17
- Label: RCA Nashville
- Songwriter(s): Vince Gill, Reed Nielsen
- Producer(s): Richard Landis

Vince Gill singles chronology
| "Cinderella" (1987) | "Let's Do Something" (1987) | "Everybody's Sweetheart" (1988) |

"Let's Do Something" is a song co-written and recorded by American country music artist Vince Gill. It was released in September 1987 as the second single from the album The Way Back Home. The song reached #16 on the Billboard Hot Country Singles & Tracks chart. Gill wrote the song with Reed Nielsen.

== Chart performance ==
| Chart (1987) | Peak position |
|---|---|
| US Hot Country Songs (Billboard) | 16 |
| Canadian RPM Country Tracks | 17 |
