= Oklahoma Borderline =

Single by Vince Gill

from the album The Things That Matter
- B-side: "She Don't Know"
- Released: November 18, 1985
- Recorded: 1984
- Genre: Country
- Length: 3:36
- Label: RCA Nashville
- Songwriters: Vince Gill, Rodney Crowell, Guy Clark
- Producer: Emory Gordy Jr.

Vince Gill singles chronology
"If It Weren't for Him" (1985)	"Oklahoma Borderline" (1985)	"With You" (1986)

"Oklahoma Borderline" is a song co-written and performed by American country music artist Vince Gill. Released in November 1985 as the third single from his album The Things That Matter, The song reached No. 9 on the Billboard Hot Country Singles & Tracks chart. The song was written by Gill, Rodney Crowell and Guy Clark.

== Chart performance ==
Chart (1985–1986)	Peak position
US Hot Country Songs (Billboard)	9
Canadian RPM Country Tracks	27
