= Fast as You =

1993 single by Dwight Yoakam

Single by Dwight Yoakam

from the album This Time
- B-side: "Home for Sale"/Let's Work Together
- Released: October 4, 1993
- Recorded: 1993
- Genre: Country
- Length: 4:45
- Label: Reprise 18341
- Songwriter: Dwight Yoakam
- Producer: Pete Anderson

Dwight Yoakam singles chronology
"A Thousand Miles from Nowhere" (1993)	"Fast as You" (1993)	"Try Not to Look So Pretty" (1994)

Music video
- "Fast as You" on YouTube

"Fast as You" is a song by American singer-songwriter and guitarist Dwight Yoakam, written and recorded by Yoakam. It was released in October 1993 as the third single from his fifth studio album, This Time (1993). Like his previous two singles, this song topped out at #2 in the United States, while it peaked at #5 in Canada. This is his last American top 10 hit to date, while he'd have three more in Canada, including another number-one. This is also his second single to enter the Billboard Hot 100, peaking at #70 on that chart.

American country music duo Steel Magnolia covered this song live, which is included in their 2010 extended play, Steel Magnolia — EP. Runaway June also recorded a cover of the song, which appears on their self-titled 2018 EP and their debut album, Blue Roses.

== Music video ==
The music video was directed by Dwight Yoakam and Carolyn Beug. It features Yoakam singing the song at a concert.

== Charts ==
"Fast as You" debuted at number 72 on the US Billboard Hot Country Singles & Tracks for the week of July 3, 1993.

Chart (1993–1994)	Peak position
Canada Country Singles (RPM)	5
US Billboard Hot 100	70
US Hot Country Songs (Billboard)	2
US Cash Box Top 100	79

=== Year-end charts ===
Chart (1994)	Position
Canada Country Tracks (RPM)	71
