= The Way Back Home =

Studio album by Vince Gill
- Released: 1987
- Studio: Conway Studios and The Grey Room (Hollywood, California); The Village Recorder (Los Angeles, California)
- Genre: Country
- Length: 34:19
- Label: RCA Nashville
- Producer: Richard Landis

Vince Gill chronology
The Things That Matter (1985)	The Way Back Home (1987)	When I Call Your Name (1989)

Singles from The Way Back Home
- 1. "Cinderella" Released: March 1987; 2. "Let's Do Something" Released: September 19, 1987; 3. "Everybody's Sweetheart" Released: January 30, 1988; 4. "The Radio" Released: June 4, 1988

Professional ratings
Review scores
Source	Rating
AllMusic	3/5 stars

The Way Back Home is the second studio album by American country music artist Vince Gill. It was released in 1987 by RCA Nashville and it produced four chart singles on the Billboard country charts. In order of release, these were "Cinderella" (No. 5), "Let's Do Something (No. 16), "Everybody's Sweetheart" (No. 11) and "The Radio" (No. 39). After the final single, Gill left RCA's roster in favor of MCA Nashville, where in 1989 he released his fourth album, When I Call Your Name.

== Track listing ==
No.	Title	Writer(s)	Length
1.	"Everybody's Sweetheart"	Vince Gill	2:52
2.	"The Way Back Home"	Gill	3:56
3.	"Cinderella"	Reed Nielsen	3:36
4.	"Let's Do Something"	Gill; Nielsen	3:19
5.	"The Radio"	Gill; Nielsen	4:05
6.	"Baby That's Tough"	Gill; Guy Clark	3:38
7.	"Losing Your Love"	Gill; Hank DeVito; Kye Fleming	4:47
8.	"It Doesn't Matter Anymore"	Paul Anka	3:36
9.	"Something's Missing"	Gill	4:30
Total length:			34:19

== Production ==
- Richard Landis – producer
- Csaba Petocz – recording
- Joe Bogan – additional recording
- John Vigran – additional recording
- Jeff DeMorris – recording assistant
- Richard McKeinon – recording assistant
- Dennis Ritchie – additional recording assistant
- Jim Dineen – overdub recording
- Ed Thacker – mixing
- Wally Traugott – mastering at Capitol Studios (Hollywood, California)
- Mary Hamilton – art direction
- John Coulter Design – design
- Dennis Keely – photography, hand tinting
- Fitzgerald Hartley Co. – management

Reissue Credits

- Mike Ragogna – producer
- Elliott Federman – remastering at SAJE Sound (New York, NY)
- Claudia Depkin, Joanne Feltman and Glenn Korman – archivists

== Personnel ==
- Vince Gill – lead vocals, backing vocals, guitars, banjo, dobro, mandolin
- Philip Aaberg – acoustic piano
- Randy Kerber – acoustic piano
- Richard Landis – synthesizers, percussion
- Jim Lang – synthesizers
- Alan Pasqua – synthesizers
- George Doering – guitars
- Reed Nielson – acoustic guitar (3), backing vocals (3)
- JayDee Maness – pedal steel guitar
- Leland Sklar – bass
- Neil Stubenhaus – bass
- Roy Huskey, Jr. – upright bass
- Carlos Vega – drums
- Leonard Arnold – percussion
- Byron Berline – fiddle
- Charlie Calello – rhythm arrangements
- Kristine Arnold – backing vocals
- Rosanne Cash – backing vocals
- Joe Chemay – backing vocals
- Rodney Crowell – backing vocals
- Kevin Dorsey – backing vocals
- Kenny Edwards – backing vocals
- Janis Gill – backing vocals
- Andrew Gold – backing vocals
- Jim Haas – backing vocals
- Emmylou Harris – backing vocals
- Bonnie Raitt – backing vocals
- Jerry Whitman – backing vocals

== Chart performance ==
Chart (1987)	Peak position
U.S. Billboard Top Country Albums	13
