= The Things That Matter =

Studio album by Vince Gill
- Released: 1985
- Studio: The Music Mill (Nashville, Tennessee); United Western Recorders (Hollywood, California)
- Genre: Country
- Length: 30:49
- Label: RCA Nashville
- Producer: Emory Gordy Jr.

Vince Gill chronology
Turn Me Loose (1984)	The Things That Matter (1985)	The Way Back Home (1987)

Singles from The Things That Matter
- 1. "True Love" Released: March 16, 1985; 2. "If It Weren't for Him" Released: June 24, 1985; 3. "Oklahoma Borderline" Released: November 18, 1985; 4. "With You" Released: May 1986

Professional ratings
Review scores
Source	Rating
AllMusic	3/5 stars

The Things That Matter is the debut studio album by American country music artist Vince Gill. It was released in 1985 on RCA Nashville. Its lead-off single, "True Love", reached #32 on the Billboard country charts. This song was followed by "If It Weren't for Him" (a duet with Rosanne Cash) at #10, and "Oklahoma Borderline" at #9. The Cash duet was also Gill's first Top Ten country hit. "With You" was the final single, peaking at #33.

== Track listing ==
All songs written by Vince Gill except where noted.

No.	Title	Writer(s)	Length
1.	"She Don't Know"		3:22
2.	"With You"		4:43
3.	"Savannah (Don't You Ever Think of Me)"		3:18
4.	"Colder Than Winter"		4:24
5.	"True Love"		4:01
6.	"If It Weren't for Him" (duet with Rosanne Cash)	Gill; Cash	3:33
7.	"Ain't It Always That Way"	Dave Loggins	3:50
8.	"Oklahoma Borderline"	Gill; Rodney Crowell; Guy Clark	3:38
Total length:			30:49

== Personnel ==
=== Musicians ===
- Vince Gill – vocals, backing vocals, guitars
- John Barlow Jarvis – keyboards (1–5, 7, 8)
- John Hobbs – keyboards (6)
- Billy Joe Walker Jr. – guitars (1–5, 7, 8)
- Richard Bennett – guitars (6)
- JayDee Maness – steel guitar
- Emory Gordy Jr. – bass, string arrangements (4)
- Eddie Bayers – drums (1–5, 7, 8)
- Larrie Londin – drums (6)
- Mike Porter – percussion (6)
- John Catchings – cello (4)
- Edgar Meyer – double bass (4), arrangement assistance (4)
- Sara Fogel – viola (4)
- Jim Grosjean – viola (4)
- Kris Wilkinson – viola (4)
- Ted Madsen – violin (4)
- Connie McCollister – violin (4), concertmistress (4)
- Laura Molyneaux – violin (4)
- Betty Small – violin (4)
- Jennifer Kimball – backing vocals (1)
- Janis Oliver – backing vocals (1, 3)
- Herb Pedersen – backing vocals (3, 8)
- Rosanne Cash – vocals (6)
- Rodney Crowell – backing vocals (8)

=== Production ===
- Emory Gordy Jr. – producer
- Jim Cotton – engineer (1–5, 7, 8), mixing (1–5, 7, 8)
- Joe Scaife – engineer (1–5, 7, 8), mixing (1–5, 7, 8)
- Gordon Shyrock – engineer (6)
- George Clinton – assistant engineer (1–5, 7, 8)
- David Ahlert – assistant engineer (6)
- Denny Purcell – mastering at Woodland Mastering Faculty (Nashville, Tennessee)
- Bill Brunt – art direction, design
- Mark Tucker – photography
- June Miller – make-up
- Rique – image design, stylist
- Mary Martin Management – management

2000 Reissue credits

- Rob Santos – reissue producer
- Elliott Federman – remastering at SAJE Sound (New York, NY)
- Jeremy Holiday – production coordinator
- Arlessa Barnes – project coordinator
- Stephanie Kika – project coordinator
- Robin Manning – project coordinator
- Brooke Nochomson – project coordinator
- Larry Parra – project coordinator
- Dana Renert – project coordinator
- Bill Stafford – project coordinator
- Steve Strauss – project coordinator
- Tom Tierney – project coordinator
- Traci Werbel – project coordinator
- John Hudson – product manager, art direction
- Mandana Eidgah – art direction
- Christine Chagnon – design
- Rich Kienzie – liner notes

== Chart performance ==
Chart (1985)	Peak position
U.S. Billboard Top Country Albums	63
