= Red Rock West =

1993 American film directed by John Dahl

- British theatrical poster
- Directed by: John Dahl
- Written by: John Dahl; Rick Dahl
- Produced by: Steve Golin; Sigurjón Sighvatsson
- Starring: Nicolas Cage; Dennis Hopper; Lara Flynn Boyle; Timothy Carhart; J. T. Walsh
- Cinematography: Marc Reshovsky
- Edited by: Scott Chestnut
- Music by: William Olvis
- Production companies: Propaganda Films; PolyGram Filmed Entertainment
- Distributed by: Roxie Releasing (United States); PolyGram Filmed Entertainment (International)
- Release dates: June 16, 1993 (France); January 28, 1994 (San Francisco)
- Running time: 98 minutes
- Country: United States
- Language: English
- Budget: $7 million
- Box office: $2.5 million

Red Rock West is a 1993 American independent crime thriller film directed by John Dahl, who cowrote the film's screenplay with his brother Rick. The neo-Western and neo-noir film stars Nicolas Cage, Dennis Hopper, Lara Flynn Boyle and J. T. Walsh. Its plot focuses on a Texas drifter (Cage) who is mistaken for a hitman (Hopper) while traveling through a rural Wyoming community. Filming took place on location primarily in Arizona and Montana in late 1991 to early 1992.

The film premiered in several European countries and screened at the 1993 Toronto International Film Festival before being given a limited theatrical release in the United States, beginning at San Francisco's Roxie Theater on January 28, 1994. Its release expanded in Los Angeles and New York City that spring, but despite being critically acclaimed, the film was a box-office flop, grossing $2.5 million. The film became a cult hit with Nicolas Cage fans.

== Plot ==
Michael Williams is a drifter from Odessa, Texas living out of his car after being discharged from the Marine Corps. After a drilling crew job on a Wyoming oilfield falls through due to his unwillingness to conceal a war injury on his job application, Michael wanders into the rural town of Red Rock looking for other means of work. A local bar owner named Wayne mistakes him for a hitman, "Lyle from Dallas", whom Wayne has hired to kill his wife, Suzanne. Wayne offers him a stack of cash—"half now, half later"—and Michael plays along by taking the money.

Michael visits Suzanne at Wayne's ranch, but instead of killing her, he warns her that her life is in danger. She counter offers him more money to kill Wayne. Michael tries to leave town with her cash but runs into a man who walks out into the road obscured by a broken-down pickup. He then turns back to bring him to the hospital. It turns out that the hurt man, Kurt, was one of Wayne's ranch hands and had been shot shortly before Michael ran into him, and the hospital calls in the county sheriff, who turns out to be Wayne. Michael escapes but runs into the real Lyle from Dallas. Lyle and Wayne quickly figure out what has transpired, while Michael desperately tries to warn Suzanne before Lyle finds her. They seek refuge during the night at a hotel and plan to flee together to Mexico.

The next morning, when Lyle comes to get money from Wayne, he kidnaps both Suzanne and Michael, who are trying to retrieve cash from a safe in Wayne's office. Wayne and Suzanne are revealed to be Kevin and Ann McCord, an Illinois couple wanted by the Federal Bureau of Investigation for the embezzlement of $1.9 million from a steel mill. Wayne is arrested by his own deputies who make the discovery after finding a wanted flyer for the two. Lyle returns with Michael and Suzanne hostage and gets Wayne out of jail to retrieve their stash of money. They dig up the cash from a remote graveyard where Wayne had buried it, and a melee ensues, with Lyle being killed, Wayne gravely injured, and Michael hurt as well.

Michael and Suzanne board a passing freight train. However, Suzanne tries to betray Michael, revealing herself to have shot Kurt, he throws the money out of the speeding train and then pushes Suzanne off to be arrested by the police. He remarks finally, "Adios, Red Rock". Michael notices and keeps a small packet of bills that hadn't blown out of the box car and keeps riding the train.

== Cast ==
- Nicolas Cage as Michael Williams
- Dennis Hopper as Lyle, From Dallas
- Lara Flynn Boyle as Ann McCord / Suzanne Brown
- J. T. Walsh as Kevin McCord / Sheriff Wayne Brown
- Dwight Yoakam as Truck Driver
- Timothy Carhart as Deputy Matt Greytack
- Dan Shor as Deputy Bowman
- Robert Apel as Howard
- Craig Reay as Jim
- Dale Gibson as Kurt
- Shawn Michael Ryan as Ted
- Barbara Glover as Jane
- Vance Johnson as Mr. Johnson
- Robert Beecher as Caretaker
- Jody Carter as Caretaker's Wife

== Production ==
Red Rock West was filmed from December 1991 to January 1992 on location in Willcox, Arizona on a budget of $7 million. Additional filming took place in Missoula, Montana, while the cemetery scenes were filmed inside an airplane hangar in Santa Monica, California. Some interior sequences were shot on soundstages in Los Angeles.

== Release ==
The domestic rights to Red Rock West were sold to Columbia TriStar Home Video for $2.5 million and the foreign rights to Manifesto Films, a subsidiary of PolyGram Filmed Entertainment. Test screenings for Red Rock West were not strong and Peter Graves, an independent consultant who headed the marketing department at Polygram said, "The film doesn't fall neatly into any marketable category. A western film noir isn't something people can immediately spark to". One of the producers suggested early on that the film be submitted to the Sundance Film Festival and was told by the studio that it was not a festival film. The film opened successfully in theaters in Germany, Paris, and London in the summer of 1993. It opened theatrically in Australia on November 19, 1993.

Piers Handling, director of the Toronto International Film Festival, saw the film in Paris and decided to show it at the festival in September 1993. Bill Banning, who owned the Roxie Cinema and Roxie Releasing in San Francisco, saw Red Rock West in Toronto and thought that there might be an American theatrical audience for the film. It took him until January 1994 to find out who owned the rights. The film had already played on HBO in the fall of 1993 and was due to be released on video in February 1994. Banning started showing Red Rock West at the Roxie Cinema in Los Angeles on January 28, 1994, where it broke box office records before expanding to eight theaters in the city.

It later had its general Los Angeles premiere on March 25, 1994, and opened in New York City on April 8, 1994.

=== Home media ===
Sony Pictures Home Entertainment released Red Rock West on DVD in 1999. Vinegar Syndrome released the film on Blu-ray through their Cinématographe sub-label in March 2024, featuring a new 4K restoration from the original film elements.

== Reception ==
=== Box office ===
Red Rock West grossed $2,502,551 in the United States against its approximately $7 million budget, and was a box-office flop.

=== Critical response ===
On the review aggregator website Rotten Tomatoes, 95% of 114 critics' reviews are positive. The website's consensus reads: "Red Rock West is a hidden neo-noir gem with some delightful cracks in its surface – and an opportunity to see Lara Flynn Boyle, Nicolas Cage, Dennis Hopper, and J.T. Walsh go toe-to-toe in all their early '90s glory." Metacritic, which uses a weighted average, assigned the film a score of 79 out of 100, based on 25 critics, indicating "generally favorable" reviews.

In his review for The Washington Post, Richard Harrington praised it as "a treasure waiting to be discovered". Writing in The New York Times, Caryn James called it "a terrifically enjoyable, smartly acted, over-the-top thriller". Roger Ebert praised it as "a diabolical movie that exists sneakily between a western and a thriller, between a film noir and a black comedy," and gave the film three-and-a-half stars out of four.

=== Accolades ===
Award/association	Year	Category	Recipient(s) and nominee(s)	Result	Ref.
Independent Spirit Awards	1995	Best Director	John Dahl	Nominated	
Independent Spirit Awards	1995	Best Screenplay	John Dahl; Rick Dahl	Nominated	
Saturn Awards	1995	Best Action, Adventure, or Thriller Film	Red Rock West	Nominated	

=== Year-end lists ===
- 4th – Michael MacCambridge, Austin American-Statesman
- 7th – Peter Travers, Rolling Stone
- 9th – Gene Siskel, The Chicago Tribune
- 10th – Peter Rainer, Los Angeles Times
- Honorable mention – William Arnold, Seattle Post-Intelligencer
- Honorable mention – David Elliott, The San Diego Union-Tribune

== Music ==
The soundtrack for the film features a number of country music performers, including Johnny Cash, Shania Twain, Toby Keith, The Kentucky Headhunters, and Sammy Kershaw. Dwight Yoakam, who made his acting debut in the film, wrote the film's closing credits song "A Thousand Miles From Nowhere" when the film was being made. The song went on to become a Top 10 country radio hit.

== Sources ==
- Monaco, Paul (2010). John Dahl and Neo-Noir: Examining Auteurism and Genre. Lanham, Maryland: Lexington Books. ISBN 978-0-739-13333-0.
- Silver, Alain; Ward, Elizabeth, eds. (1992). Film Noir: An Encyclopedic Reference to the American Style (Third ed.). Woodstock, New York: The Overlook Press. ISBN 978-0-879-51479-2.
