= Never Alone (Rosanne Cash song) =

Single by Vince Gill

from the album When I Call Your Name
- B-side: "Oh Girl (You Know Where to Find Me)"
- Released: September 1989
- Genre: Country
- Length: 3:34
- Label: MCA
- Songwriter(s): Vince Gill, Rosanne Cash
- Producer(s): Tony Brown

Vince Gill singles chronology
"The Radio" (1988)	"Never Alone" (1989)	"Oklahoma Swing" (1990)

"Never Alone" is a song written by American country music artists Rosanne Cash and Vince Gill. It was originally recorded by Cash on her 1985 album Rhythm & Romance and later recorded by Gill for his 1989 album When I Call Your Name. It was released in September 1989 as the first single from the album and reached number 22 on the Billboard Hot Country Singles chart.

== Chart performance ==
Chart (1989)	Peak position
US Hot Country Songs (Billboard)	22
Canadian RPM Country Tracks	35
