= No Future in the Past (Vince Gill song) =

Single by Vince Gill

from the album I Still Believe in You
- B-side: "Pretty Words"
- Released: March 29, 1993
- Recorded: 1992
- Genre: Country
- Length: 4:08
- Label: MCA
- Songwriters: Vince Gill; Carl Jackson
- Producer: Tony Brown

Vince Gill singles chronology
"The Heart Won't Lie" (1993)	"No Future in the Past" (1993)	"One More Last Chance" (1993)

"No Future in the Past" is a song co-written and recorded by American country music singer Vince Gill. It was released in March 1993 as the third single from his CD I Still Believe in You. The song peaked at number 3 on the Billboard Hot Country Singles & Tracks (now Hot Country Songs) chart. It was written by Gill and Carl Jackson.

== Chart performance ==
Chart (1993)	Peak position
Canada Country Singles (RPM)	2
US Hot Country Songs (Billboard)	3

=== Year-end charts ===
Chart (1993)	Position
Canada Country Tracks (RPM)	61
US Country Songs (Billboard)	47
