= Pocket of a Clown =

Single by Dwight Yoakam

from the album This Time
- Released: June 27, 1994
- Recorded: 1993
- Genre: Country
- Length: 2:55
- Label: Reprise 18341
- Songwriter: Dwight Yoakam
- Producer: Pete Anderson

Dwight Yoakam singles chronology
| "Try Not to Look So Pretty" (1994) | "Pocket of a Clown" (1994) | "Nothing" (1995) |

"Pocket of a Clown" is a song written and recorded by American country music artist Dwight Yoakam. It was released in June 1994 as the fifth and final single from his album This Time. This song peaked at number 22 in the United States and at number 4 in Canada.

== Critical reception ==
Deborah Evans Price, of Billboard magazine reviewed the song favorably, calling it a "nicely produced and jumping shuffle tune." She goes on to say that it isn't Yoakam's "strongest song, but it's still a few levels above much of what makes today's playlists."

== Music video ==
The music video was directed by Gregory R. Alosio. The video won the Country Music Television Europe, Music Video of the Year Award.

== Chart performance ==
"Pocket of a Clown" debuted at number 66 on the U.S. Billboard Hot Country Singles & Tracks for the week of July 2, 1994.

| Chart (1994) | Peak position |
|---|---|
| Canada Country Singles (RPM) | 4 |
| US Hot Country Songs (Billboard) | 22 |

=== Year-end charts ===
| Chart (1994) | Position |
|---|---|
| Canada Country Tracks (RPM) | 68 |
