= When I Call Your Name (Vince Gill song) =

Single by Vince Gill

from the album When I Call Your Name
- B-side: "Rita Ballou"
- Released: May 1990
- Recorded: 1989
- Genre: Neotraditional country
- Label: MCA
- Songwriters: Vince Gill, Tim DuBois
- Producer: Tony Brown

Vince Gill singles chronology
"Oklahoma Swing" (1990)	"When I Call Your Name" (1990)	"Never Knew Lonely" (1990)

"When I Call Your Name" is a song co-written and recorded by American country music artist Vince Gill. It was released in May 1990 as the third single and title track from the album When I Call Your Name. The song reached number 2 on the Billboard Hot Country Singles & Tracks chart. It was written by Gill and Tim DuBois. Patty Loveless performed backing vocals on the song. Session veteran Barry Beckett played piano on the track. The Common Linnets performed a cover of the song to celebrate 50 years of the CMA Awards.

== Cover versions ==
Country music singer Cody Johnson covered the song from the television special CMT Giants: Vince Gill.

Gill later released the song as a part of his 12-month 50 Years from Home EP series on the series' third installment, Brown's Diner Bar, in January 2026.

== Critical reception ==
In 2024, Rolling Stone ranked the song at #91 on its 200 Greatest Country Songs of All Time ranking.

== Music video ==
The music video was directed by Bill Pope and premiered in mid-1990. Although Patty Loveless sang the song with Gill in live performances, she did not appear in the video. Instead, country singer Matraca Berg appeared, lip-syncing to Loveless's vocals.

== Chart performance ==
Chart (1990)	Peak position
Canada Country Singles (RPM)	5
US Hot Country Songs (Billboard)	2

=== Year-end charts ===
Chart (1990)	Position
Canada Country Tracks (RPM)	82
US Country Songs (Billboard)	39

== Certifications ==
Region	Certification	Certified units/sales
United States (RIAA)	Gold	500,000^{‡}
^{‡} Sales+streaming figures based on certification alone.
