= When I Call Your Name (album) =

Studio album by Vince Gill
- Released: November 14, 1989
- Recorded: 1989
- Studio: Emerald Sound Studios and Masterfonics (Nashville, Tennessee)
- Genre: Country
- Length: 35:48
- Label: MCA
- Producer: Tony Brown

Vince Gill chronology
The Way Back Home (1987)	When I Call Your Name (1989)	Pocket Full of Gold (1991)

Singles from When I Call Your Name
- 1. "Never Alone" Released: September 1989; 2. "Oklahoma Swing" Released: January 20, 1990; 3. "When I Call Your Name" Released: May 1990; 4. "Never Knew Lonely" Released: September 1990

Professional ratings
Review scores
Source	Rating
AllMusic	link
Chicago Tribune	link

When I Call Your Name is the third studio album from American country music artist Vince Gill. His breakthrough album, it was released in 1989 by MCA Records, Gill's first for the label. It features the singles "Never Alone," "Oklahoma Swing," "When I Call Your Name" and "Never Knew Lonely."

"Ridin' the Rodeo" was later released by the band Perfect Stranger in 1994 from their debut album You Have the Right to Remain Silent.

== Track listing ==
No.	Title	Writer(s)	Length
1.	"Never Alone"	Vince Gill; Rosanne Cash	3:34
2.	"Sight for Sore Eyes"	Gill; Guy Clark	3:07
3.	"Oh Girl (You Know Where to Find Me)"	Gill	3:40
4.	"Oklahoma Swing" (duet with Reba McEntire)	Gill; Tim DuBois	3:05
5.	"When I Call Your Name"	Gill; DuBois	4:14
6.	"Ridin' the Rodeo"	Gill; Kostas	2:53
7.	"Never Knew Lonely"	Gill	4:02
8.	"We Won't Dance"	Greg Trooper	4:35
9.	"We Could Have Been"	Don Cook; John Barlow Jarvis	3:29
10.	"Rita Ballou"	Clark	3:12
Total length:			35:51

== Production ==
- Tony Brown – producer
- John Guess – recording
- Steve Tillisch – overdub recording
- David Boyce – second engineer
- Mark J. Coddington – second engineer
- Julian King – second engineer
- Tim Kish – second engineer
- Marty Williams – second engineer
- Steve Marcantonio – mixing
- Milan Bogdan – digital editing
- Glenn Meadows – mastering
- Jessie Noble – project coordinator
- Virginia Team – art direction
- Jerry Joyner – design
- Beverly Parker – photography
- Fitzgerald Hartley Co. – management

== Personnel ==
- Vince Gill – vocals, acoustic lead guitar, electric guitar, mandolin, backing vocals (1, 3, 5, 7, 9)
- Pete Wasner – keyboards
- Barry Beckett – organ (2), acoustic piano (5)
- Randy Scruggs – acoustic guitar, electric guitar
- Fred Tackett – acoustic guitar, electric guitar
- Paul Franklin – steel guitar
- Willie Weeks – bass
- Eddie Bayers – drums, percussion
- Kathie Baillie – backing vocals (2, 9)
- Harry Stinson – backing vocals (3, 7, 10)
- Billy Thomas – backing vocals (3, 7)
- Reba McEntire – vocals (4)
- Patty Loveless – backing vocals (5)
- Herb Pedersen – backing vocals (6)
- Anthony Crawford – backing vocals (8)
- Emmylou Harris – backing vocals (10)

== Chart performance ==
=== Weekly charts ===
Chart (1989–1990)	Peak position
US Billboard 200	67
US Top Country Albums (Billboard)	2

=== Year-end charts ===
Chart (1990)	Position
US Top Country Albums (Billboard)	28
Chart (1991)	Position
US Top Country Albums (Billboard)	9
Chart (1992)	Position
US Top Country Albums (Billboard)	48

== Certifications ==
Region	Certification	Certified units/sales
Canada (Music Canada)	Platinum	100,000^{^}
United States (RIAA)	2× Platinum	2,000,000^{^}
^{^} Shipments figures based on certification alone.
