= Don't Let Our Love Start Slippin' Away =

Single by Vince Gill

from the album I Still Believe in You
- B-side: "Love Never Broke Anyone's Heart"
- Released: October 12, 1992
- Recorded: 1992
- Genre: Country
- Length: 3:43
- Label: MCA
- Songwriters: Vince Gill, Pete Wasner
- Producer: Tony Brown

Vince Gill singles chronology
"I Still Believe in You" (1992)	"Don't Let Our Love Start Slippin' Away" (1992)	"The Heart Won't Lie" (1993)

"Don't Let Our Love Start Slippin' Away" is a song co-written and recorded by American country music singer Vince Gill that reached the top of the Billboard Hot Country Singles & Tracks (now Hot Country Songs) chart. It was released in October 1992 as the second single from his album I Still Believe in You. It reached number-one on the U.S. Billboard Hot Country Singles & Tracks and on the Canadian RPM Country Tracks chart. The song was written by Gill and Pete Wasner.

== Cover versions ==
Country music singer Maren Morris covered the song from the television special CMT Giants: Vince Gill

== Critical reception ==
Deborah Evans Price, of Billboard magazine reviewed the song favorably saying that "Gill offers his followers an infectiously catchy package." She goes on to say that "instrumentation and production to the point of perfection."

== Music video ==
The music video, which was directed by John Lloyd Miller and premiered in late 1992, depicts Gill performing the song at a club where he is backed by several notable singers and musicians. They include (in alphabetical order): Little Jimmy Dickens, Steve Earle, Bruce Hornsby, Patty Loveless, Kathy Mattea, Delbert McClinton, Michael McDonald, Reba McEntire, Lee Roy Parnell, Carl Perkins, Leon Russell, Leland Sklar, Pam Tillis, Kevin Welch, Kelly Willis, members of the band Shenandoah and Kentucky Headhunters drummer Fred Young. McEntire was reprising her waitress role from her "Is There Life Out There" video earlier that same year. The storyline in this video was that the aforementioned performers were there to substitute for Gill's band, who were unable to show up. The video also features movie tough man & bouncer Randall "Tex" Cobb both at the beginning and then dancing later in the video.

== Chart performance ==
"Don't Let Our Love Start Slippin' Away" debuted at number 63 on the U.S. Billboard Hot Country Singles & Tracks for the week of October 17, 1992.

Chart (1992)	Peak position
Canada Country Singles (RPM)	1
US Hot Country Songs (Billboard)	1

=== Year-end charts ===
Chart (1993)	Position
Canada Country Tracks (RPM)	27
US Country Songs (Billboard)	55

== Certifications ==
Region	Certification	Certified units/sales
United States (RIAA)	Gold	500,000^{‡}
^{‡} Sales+streaming figures based on certification alone.

== Cover versions ==
Since adding Gill in their lineup, the Eagles have often played the song live in concert. A version appears on their live album Live from the Forum MMXVIII.
