= Never Knew Lonely =

Single by Vince Gill

from the album When I Call Your Name
- B-side: "Riding the Rodeo"
- Released: September 1990
- Recorded: 1989
- Genre: Country
- Length: 4:03
- Label: MCA
- Songwriter: Vince Gill
- Producer: Tony Brown

Vince Gill singles chronology
"When I Call Your Name" (1990)	"Never Knew Lonely" (1990)	"Pocket Full of Gold" (1991)

"Never Knew Lonely" is a song written and recorded by American country music artist Vince Gill. It was released in September 1990 as the fourth single from the album When I Call Your Name. The song reached number 3 on the Billboard Hot Country Singles & Tracks chart.

== Music video ==
The music video was directed by John Lloyd Miller and premiered in late 1990.

== Chart performance ==
Chart (1990-1991)	Peak position
Canada Country Singles (RPM)	7
US Hot Country Songs (Billboard)	3

=== Year-end charts ===
Chart (1991)	Position
US Country Songs (Billboard)	64
