= A Thousand Miles from Nowhere =

Single by Dwight Yoakam

from the album This Time
- B-side: "Something to Talk About"
- Released: June 21, 1993
- Recorded: 1993
- Genre: Country
- Length: 4:27
- Label: Reprise 18528
- Songwriter: Dwight Yoakam
- Producer: Pete Anderson

Dwight Yoakam singles chronology
"Ain't That Lonely Yet" (1993)	"A Thousand Miles from Nowhere" (1993)	"Fast as You" (1993)

"A Thousand Miles from Nowhere" is a song written and recorded by American country music artist Dwight Yoakam. It was released in June 1993 as the second single from his album This Time. Like his previous single, this song peaked at number 2 in the United States and at number 3 in Canada. The song was featured in two films, Red Rock West (filmed prior to the release of This Time using a studio demo recording) and Chasers.

== Content ==
The song's narrator is dealing with the aftermath of the end of his relationship with his significant other. The breakup is causing him to feel sad, lonely, and lost. Some of the lyrics in the refrain ("time don't matter to me" and "there's no place I wanna be") also describe his feelings of apathy and disinterest with everything else around him.

== Music video ==
The music video was directed by Dwight Yoakam with the help of Carolyn Mayer (according to some sources). It features Yoakam riding on a Copper Basin Railway train across the Arizona desert, and is shown in two frames showing mostly different views of the train and Yoakam. Fellow musician Kelly Willis does a cameo appearance as the young woman standing in a shallow stream.

== Chart performance ==
"A Thousand Miles from Nowhere" debuted at number 72 on the U.S. Billboard Hot Country Singles & Tracks for the week of June 26, 1993.

Chart (1993)	Peak position
Canada Country Singles (RPM)	3
US Hot Country Songs (Billboard)	2

=== Year-end charts ===
Chart (1993)	Position
Canada Country Tracks (RPM)	62
US Country Songs (Billboard)	17
