= John Hughey =

- Born: December 27, 1933; Elaine, Arkansas, U.S.
- Died: November 18, 2007 (aged 73) Nashville, Tennessee, U.S.
- Genres: Country
- Occupation: Session musician
- Instrument: Pedal steel guitar
- Years active: 1953–2007

John Hughey (December 27, 1933 – November 18, 2007) was an American musician. He was known for his work as a session pedal steel guitar player for various country music acts, most notably Vince Gill and Conway Twitty. A member of the Steel Guitar Hall of Fame, Hughey was known for a distinctive playing style called "crying steel", which focused primarily on the higher range of the guitar.

== Biography ==
John Hughey was born December 27, 1933, in Elaine, Arkansas. He began playing guitar at age nine, when his parents bought him an acoustic guitar from Sears. In the seventh grade, he befriended a classmate named Harold Jenkins, who would later become a prominent country singer under his stage name Conway Twitty. (Hughey and Jenkins also attended high school together.)

Influenced by Eddy Arnold's steel guitarist, Little Roy Wiggins, Hughey asked his father to buy him a lap steel guitar. Along with Jenkins and other high school friends, Hughey performed in a local band called the Phillips County Ramblers. Hughey first played professionally as a member of Slim Rhodes and The Mother's Best Mountaineers, a Memphis, Tennessee-based band. After leaving this band, Hughey joined Twitty on the road as his pedal steel guitarist, and backed Twitty from 1968 to 1988. He also recorded with various other acts, such as Marty Stuart, Willie Nelson, Elvis Presley, and Dickey Betts. By the 1980s, he began playing for Loretta Lynn, then moved on to play steel for Vince Gill for twelve years. Hughey was inducted into the Steel Guitar Hall of Fame in 1996. In the 2000s, he and several other Nashville musicians formed a Western swing band called The Time Jumpers, who performed every Monday at a club in Nashville.

Hughey died in Nashville on November 18, 2007, from heart complications, one month after having had a stent put in his heart. His funeral was held on November 21, 2007, at the First Baptist Church in Hendersonville, Tennessee.

== Style and legacy ==
Hughey's method of steel guitar playing was known as the "crying steel" method, because of his use of vibrato on the instrument's higher range. Vince Gill has cited Hughey as giving "definition" to his music, citing the single "Look at Us" (from 1991's Pocket Full of Gold) as an example. According to Gill, that song's steel guitar intro "makes that song recognizable by what happens before any words even get sung." Marty Stuart, for whom Hughey played on the 1992 album This One's Gonna Hurt You, described him as "a top drawer statesman who helped define the whole 20th century sound of country music".

== Family ==
For 45 years, Hughey was married to his wife, Jean, who often sat in the audience during The Time Jumpers' performances. Together, they had one daughter. Hughey also has four brothers and four sisters. Brother Gene Hughey would join John as part of Conway Twitty's band, The Twitty Birds, playing bass guitar following the death of Joe E. Lewis in 1976. Gene Hughey died August 2, 2021.
