= Ain't That Lonely Yet =

Single by Dwight Yoakam

from the album This Time
- B-side: "Lonesome Roads"
- Released: March 8, 1993
- Genre: Country
- Length: 3:17
- Label: Reprise 18590
- Songwriters: Kostas; James House
- Producer: Pete Anderson

Dwight Yoakam singles chronology
"Suspicious Minds" (1992)	"Ain't That Lonely Yet" (1993)	"A Thousand Miles from Nowhere" (1993)

"Ain't That Lonely Yet" is a song written by Kostas and James House, and recorded by American country music artist Dwight Yoakam. It was released in March 1993 as the lead single from his album This Time. It preceded the release of This Time by two weeks. It peaked at number 2 for the week of May 22, 1993, on the Billboard Hot Country Singles & Tracks; in addition, it went on to win a Grammy award for Best Male Country Vocal Performance.

== Content ==
The song is a mid-tempo in which the narrator has just left his lover because of what she has put him through. She tries to win him back with phone calls and notes (left on his door). The narrator denies his former lover, and tries to convince himself that he "ain't that lonely yet," or not lonely enough to return to her.

== Critical reception ==
Bill Janovitz of Allmusic gave the song a positive review. He says the most compelling verse in the song is the second verse, because of the metaphor of the narrator's ex-lover as a spider.

== Music video ==
The music video was directed by Dwight Yoakam and Carolyn Mayer. The filming took place the same day of the 1993 World Trade Center bombing.

== Chart positions ==
"Ain't That Lonely Yet" debuted at number 60 on the U.S. Billboard Hot Country Singles & Tracks for the week of March 13, 1993.

Chart (1993)	Peak position
Canada Country Singles (RPM)	1
US Bubbling Under Hot 100 (Billboard)	1
US Hot Country Songs (Billboard)	2

=== Year-end charts ===
Chart (1993)	Position
Canada Country Tracks (RPM)	3
US Country Songs (Billboard)	15
