= Liza Jane (Vince Gill song) =

1991 single by Vince Gill

Single by Vince Gill

from the album Pocket Full of Gold
- B-side: "What's a Man to Do"
- Released: June 3, 1991
- Recorded: 1990
- Genre: Country
- Length: 2:53
- Label: MCA
- Songwriters: Vince Gill, Reed Nielsen
- Producer: Tony Brown

Vince Gill singles chronology
| "Pocket Full of Gold" (1991) | "Liza Jane" (1991) | "Look at Us" (1991) |

"Liza Jane" is a song co-written and recorded by American country music artist Vince Gill. It was released in June 1991 as the second single from the album Pocket Full of Gold. The song reached number 7 on the Billboard Hot Country Singles & Tracks chart. It was written by Gill and Reed Nielsen.

== Cover versions ==
Country music singer Brad Paisley covered the song from the television special CMT Giants: Vince Gill.

== Music video ==
The music video was directed by John Lloyd Miller and premiered in mid-1991. The video shoot was planned to take place on the grounds of the Broadway Drive-In theater, located in Dickson, Tennessee, but per the video’s introduction, it had been rained out. Instead, the video was filmed inside one of the theater’s concession stands.

== Personnel ==
Compiled from the liner notes.

- Eddie Bayers – drums
- Barry Beckett – piano
- Vince Gill – lead vocals, electric guitar
- Mac McAnally – acoustic guitar
- Billy Thomas – backing vocals
- Billy Joe Walker Jr. – electric guitar
- Pete Wasner – keyboards
- Willie Weeks – bass guitar
- Andrea Zonn – fiddle

== Chart performance ==
| Chart (1991) | Peak position |
|---|---|
| Canada Country Singles (RPM) | 3 |
| US Hot Country Songs (Billboard) | 7 |

=== Year-end charts ===
| Chart (1991) | Position |
|---|---|
| Canada Country Tracks (RPM) | 54 |
| US Country Songs (Billboard) | 75 |
