= I Still Believe in You (Vince Gill song) =

Single by Vince Gill

from the album I Still Believe in You
- B-side: "One More Last Chance"
- Released: June 29, 1992
- Recorded: 1992
- Genre: Country
- Length: 3:59
- Label: MCA
- Songwriters: Vince Gill, John Barlow Jarvis
- Producer: Tony Brown

Vince Gill singles chronology
"Take Your Memory with You" (1992)	"I Still Believe in You" (1992)	"Don't Let Our Love Start Slippin' Away" (1992)

"I Still Believe in You" is a song co-written and recorded by American country music singer Vince Gill. It was released in June 1992 as the first single from his album of the same name. The song reached the top of the Billboard Hot Country Singles & Tracks (now Hot Country Songs) chart, making it Gill's first number one. It was written by Gill and John Barlow Jarvis. The song was covered by Jazz artist Warren Hill featuring singer Mitch Malloy in 1993 and English rock band Bad Company on their 1996 CD Stories Told & Untold with Robert Hart on lead vocals.

"I Still Believe in You" debuted at number 55 on the U.S. Billboard Hot Country Singles & Tracks for the week of July 4, 1992.

== Content ==
The narrator apologizes to his romantic partner for being selfish and not spending enough time with her, and vows to make it up to her.

== Cover versions ==
Jazz singer Wendy Moten performed a cover of the song during the television special CMT Giants: Vince Gill.

== Critical reception ==
Deborah Evans Price, of Billboard magazine reviewed the song favorably calling it "a pristine ballad embraced by one of country's most finely refined vocalists." She added that the song features "delivery and production strong enough to pull on the ears of other formats."

== Music video ==
The music video was filmed at the Rialto Square Theatre in Joliet, Illinois. The video was directed by John Lloyd Miller and premiered in mid-1992. It shows Gill singing on stage with a microphone while seated to an empty auditorium. Before the music begins, as Gill is walking into the theater, the sound of paparazzi can be heard in the background. It ends with Vince leaving the theater, his image disappearing before the screen fades to black.

== Charts ==
=== Weekly charts ===
Chart (1992)	Peak position
Canada Adult Contemporary (RPM)	34
Canada Country Singles (RPM)	1
US Adult Contemporary (Billboard)	30
US Hot Country Songs (Billboard)	1

=== Year-end charts ===
Chart (1992)	Position
Canada Country Tracks (RPM)	18
US Country Songs (Billboard)	8
