= Lyle Lovett discography =

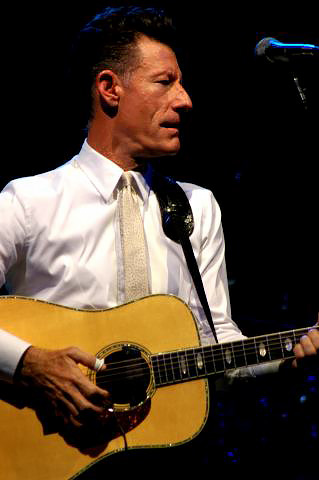
- Lovett in 2005
- Studio albums: 11
- Live albums: 1
- Compilation albums: 2
- Singles: 25
- Other singles: 2

American singer-songwriter Lyle Lovett has been active since 1980, and has recorded fourteen albums and released 25 singles to date, including his highest entry, the number 10 chart hit on the US Billboard Hot Country Songs chart, "Cowboy Man".

Despite not having charted a top 40 single since 1988, all of Lovett's 1990's albums were certified Gold by the Recording Industry Association of America.

== Studio albums ==
=== 1980s ===
Title	Album details	Peak chart positions				Certifications (sales threshold)
Title	Album details	US Country	US	CAN	NZ	Certifications (sales threshold)
Lyle Lovett	Release date: 1986; Label: Curb/MCA Records; Formats: CD, LP, cassette	14	—	—	—	
Pontiac	Release date: 1987; Label: Curb/MCA Records; Formats: CD, LP, cassette	12	117	—	—	US: Gold
Lyle Lovett and His Large Band	Release date: January 25, 1989; Label: Curb/MCA Records; Formats: CD, LP, cassette	10	62	88	45	CAN: Gold; US: Gold
"—" denotes releases that did not chart

=== 1990s ===
Title	Album details	Peak chart positions					Certifications (sales threshold)
Title	Album details	US Country	US	CAN	NZ	UK	Certifications (sales threshold)
Joshua Judges Ruth	Release date: March 31, 1992; Label: Curb/MCA Records; Formats: CD, cassette, DTS-CD	—	57	49	23	—	US: Gold
I Love Everybody	Release date: September 27, 1994; Label: Curb/MCA Records; Formats: CD, cassette	—	26	40	36	54	US: Gold
The Road to Ensenada	Release date: June 18, 1996; Label: Curb/MCA Records; Formats: CD, cassette	4	24	23	—	62	US: Gold
Step Inside This House	Release date: September 22, 1998; Label: Curb/MCA Records; Formats: CD, cassette	9	55	—	—	190	US: Gold
"—" denotes releases that did not chart

=== 2000s ===
Title	Album details	Peak chart positions	
Title	Album details	US Country	US
My Baby Don't Tolerate	Release date: September 30, 2003; Label: Curb/Lost Highway Records; Formats: CD	7	63
It's Not Big It's Large	Release date: August 28, 2007; Label: Curb/Lost Highway Records; Formats: CD, music download	2	18
Natural Forces	Release date: October 20, 2009; Label: Curb/Lost Highway Records; Formats: CD, music download	8	29

=== 2010s and 2020s ===
Title	Album details	Peak chart positions	
Title	Album details	US Country	US
Release Me	Release date: February 28, 2012; Label: Curb/Lost Highway Records; Formats: CD, music download	9	60
12th of June	Release date: May 13, 2022; Label: Verve Records; Formats: CD, music download	—	—

== Compilation albums ==
Title	Album details	Peak chart positions	
Title	Album details	US Country	US
Anthology, Vol. 1: Cowboy Man	Release date: October 23, 2001; Label: Curb/MCA Records; Formats: CD, cassette	26	195
Smile: Songs from the Movies	Release date: February 25, 2003; Label: Curb/MCA Records; Formats: CD	—	106
"—" denotes releases that did not chart

== Other albums ==
=== Live albums ===
Title	Album details	Peak chart positions		
Title	Album details	US Country	US	CAN Country
Live in Texas	Release date: June 23, 1999; Label: Curb/MCA Records; Formats: CD, cassette	7	94	14

=== Soundtrack albums ===
Title	Album details
Dr. T & the Women	Release date: September 26, 2000; Label: MCA Records; Formats: CD

== Singles ==
=== 1980s ===
Year	Single	Peak chart positions			Album
Year	Single	US Country	CAN Country	NL	Album
1986	"Farther Down the Line"	21	—	—	Lyle Lovett
1986	"Cowboy Man"	10	23	—	Lyle Lovett
1987	"God Will"	18	23	—	Lyle Lovett
1987	"Why I Don't Know"	15	24	—	Lyle Lovett
1987	"Give Back My Heart"	13	18	—	Pontiac
1988	"She's No Lady"	17	8	48	Pontiac
1988	"I Loved You Yesterday"	24	40	—	Pontiac
1988	"Simple Song"	—	—	74	Pontiac
1988	"If I Had a Boat"	66	*	—	Pontiac
1988	"I Married Her Because She Looks Like You"	45	*	—	Lyle Lovett & His Large Band
1989	"Stand by Your Man"	82	—	—	Lyle Lovett & His Large Band
1989	"Nobody Knows Me"	84	—	—	Lyle Lovett & His Large Band
1989	"If I Were the Man You Wanted"	49	50	—	Lyle Lovett
"—" denotes releases that did not chart * denotes unknown peak positions

=== 1990s–2010s ===
Year	Single	Peak chart positions					Album
Year	Single	US Country	US AAA	US Main Rock	CAN	CAN AC	Album
1990	"Here I Am"	—	—	—	—	—	Lyle Lovett & His Large Band
1991	"You Can't Resist It"	—	—	—	77	33	Switch (soundtrack)
1992	"You've Been So Good Up to Now"	—	—	36	—	—	Joshua Judges Ruth
1992	"North Dakota"	—	—	—	—	—	Joshua Judges Ruth
1994	"Skinny Legs"	—	—	—	—	—	I Love Everybody
1994	"Just the Morning"	—	—	—	—	—	I Love Everybody
1996	"Private Conversation"	72	12	—	—	—	The Road to Ensenada
1996	"Don't Touch My Hat"	68	—	—	—	—	The Road to Ensenada
1996	"It Ought to Be Easier"	—	—	—	—	—	The Road to Ensenada
1997	"That's Right (You're Not from Texas)"	—	—	—	—	—	The Road to Ensenada
1998	"Bears"	—	11	—	—	—	Step Inside This House
1999	"You Can't Resist It" (live)	—	6	—	—	—	Live in Texas
2000	"San Antonio Girl"	—	—	—	—	—	Anthology, Volume 1
2003	"Smile"	—	—	—	—	—	Smile: Songs from the Movies
2003	"Gee Baby, Ain't I Good to You"	—	—	—	—	—	Smile: Songs from the Movies
2003	"My Baby Don't Tolerate"	—	19	—	—	—	My Baby Don't Tolerate
2004	"In My Own Mind"	—	—	—	—	—	My Baby Don't Tolerate
2007	"South Texas Girl"	—	—	—	—	—	It's Not Big It's Large
2008	"No Big Deal"	—	—	—	—	—	It's Not Big It's Large
2012	"Isn't That So"	—	26	—	—	—	Release Me
"—" denotes releases that did not chart

=== Featured singles ===
Year	Single	Artist	Peak positions	Album
Year	Single	Artist	CAN AC	Album
1994	"Funny How Time Slips Away"	Al Green	—	Rhythm, Country and Blues
1996	"You've Got a Friend in Me"	Randy Newman	40	Toy Story: An Original Walt Disney Records Soundtrack
2014	"Girls from Texas"	Pat Green	—	Home
"—" denotes releases that did not chart

== Other appearances ==
Year	Song	Album
2018	"England Swings"	King of the Road: A Tribute to Roger Miller

== Music videos ==
Year	Video	Director
1987	"If I Had a Boat"	Wayne Miller
1988	"She's No Lady"	
1988	"Pontiac"	
1990	"This Old Porch"	
1992	"Church"	
1994	"Penguins"	
1994	"Blues for Dixie"	Jim May
1996	"You've Got a Friend in Me"	Steven Goldmann
2004	"In My Own Mind"	
2007	"South Texas Girl"	
2018	"Don't Cry a Tear"	
