= Anthology, Vol. 1: Cowboy Man =

Compilation album by Lyle Lovett
- Released: October 23, 2001
- Genre: Country
- Label: MCA

Lyle Lovett chronology
Dr. T & The Women (2000)	Anthology, Vol. 1: Cowboy Man (2001)	Smile: Songs from the Movies (2003)

Professional ratings
Review scores
Source	Rating
AllMusic	3/5 stars

Anthology, Vol. 1: Cowboy Man is a compilation album of country songs by Lyle Lovett, released in 2001. Two songs ("The Truck Song" and "San Antonio Girl") saw their first release on this compilation; all other tracks were previously released.

Both previously unreleased tracks were later included on Lovett's 2003 studio album My Baby Don't Tolerate.

== Track listing ==
All songs by Lyle Lovett.

1. "The Truck Song" – 3:06
  - previously unreleased
2. "Cowboy Man" – 2:51
  - From Lyle Lovett, 1986
3. "God Will" – 2:15
  - From Lyle Lovett, 1986
4. "Farther Down the Line" – 3:06
  - From Lyle Lovett, 1986
5. "This Old Porch" – 4:17
  - From Lyle Lovett, 1986
6. "Why I Don't Know" – 2:43
  - From Lyle Lovett, 1986
7. "If I Were the Man You Wanted" – 3:59
  - From Lyle Lovett, 1986
8. "San Antonio Girl" – 3:37
  - previously unreleased
9. "If I Had a Boat" – 3:09
  - From Pontiac, 1988
10. "Give Back My Heart" – 3:02
  - From Pontiac, 1988
11. "I Loved You Yesterday" – 2:59
  - From Pontiac, 1988
12. "Walk Through the Bottomland" – 4:13
  - From Pontiac, 1988
13. "L.A. County" – 3:18
  - From Pontiac, 1988
14. "Which Way Does That Old Pony Run" – 4:10
  - From Lyle Lovett and His Large Band, 1989
15. "If You Were to Wake Up" – 4:09
  - From Lyle Lovett and His Large Band, 1989

== Chart performance ==
Chart (2001)	Peak position
U.S. Billboard Top Country Albums	26
U.S. Billboard 200	195
