= Doug Sax =

American mastering engineer (1936–2015)

Doug Lionel Sax
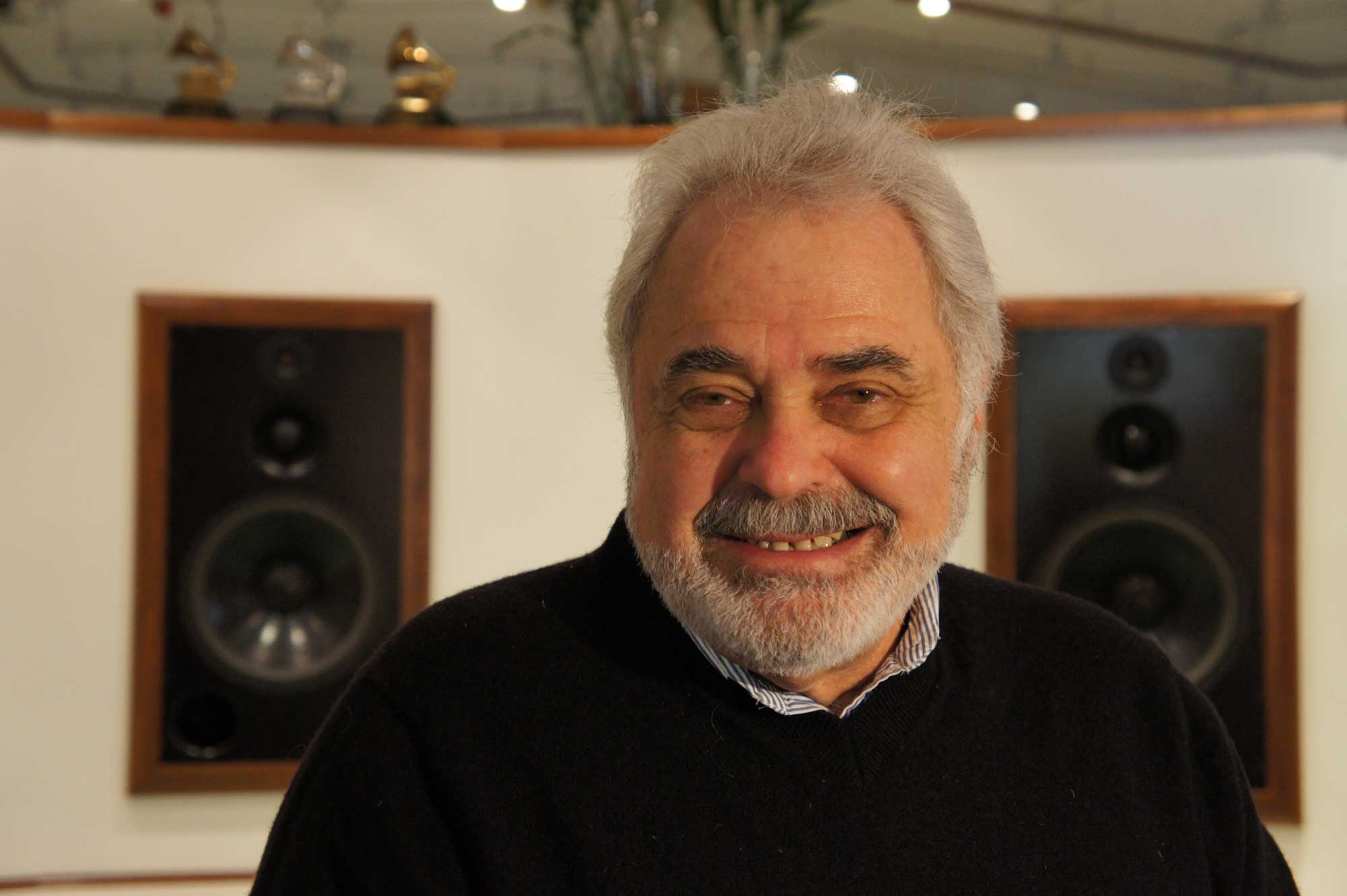
- Sax in 2014

Background information
- Born: Douglas Sax; April 26, 1936; Los Angeles, California, U.S.
- Died: April 2, 2015 (aged 78) Los Angeles, California, U.S.
- Occupation: Mastering engineer

Doug Sax (April 26, 1936 – April 2, 2015) was an American mastering engineer from Los Angeles, California. He mastered three The Doors' albums, including their 1967 debut; six Pink Floyd's albums, including The Wall; Ray Charles' multiple-Grammy winner Genius Loves Company in 2004, and Bob Dylan's 36th studio album Shadows in the Night in 2015.

== Early life ==
Sax was born in Los Angeles on April 26, 1936, to Mildred and Remy Sax. While attending Fairfax High School in West Los Angeles, Sax played the trumpet alongside trumpeter Herb Alpert. Upon graduation, Sax attended University of California, Los Angeles and then was drafted into the Army where he played trumpet in the Seventh Army Symphony Orchestra from 1959 to 1961.

== Career ==
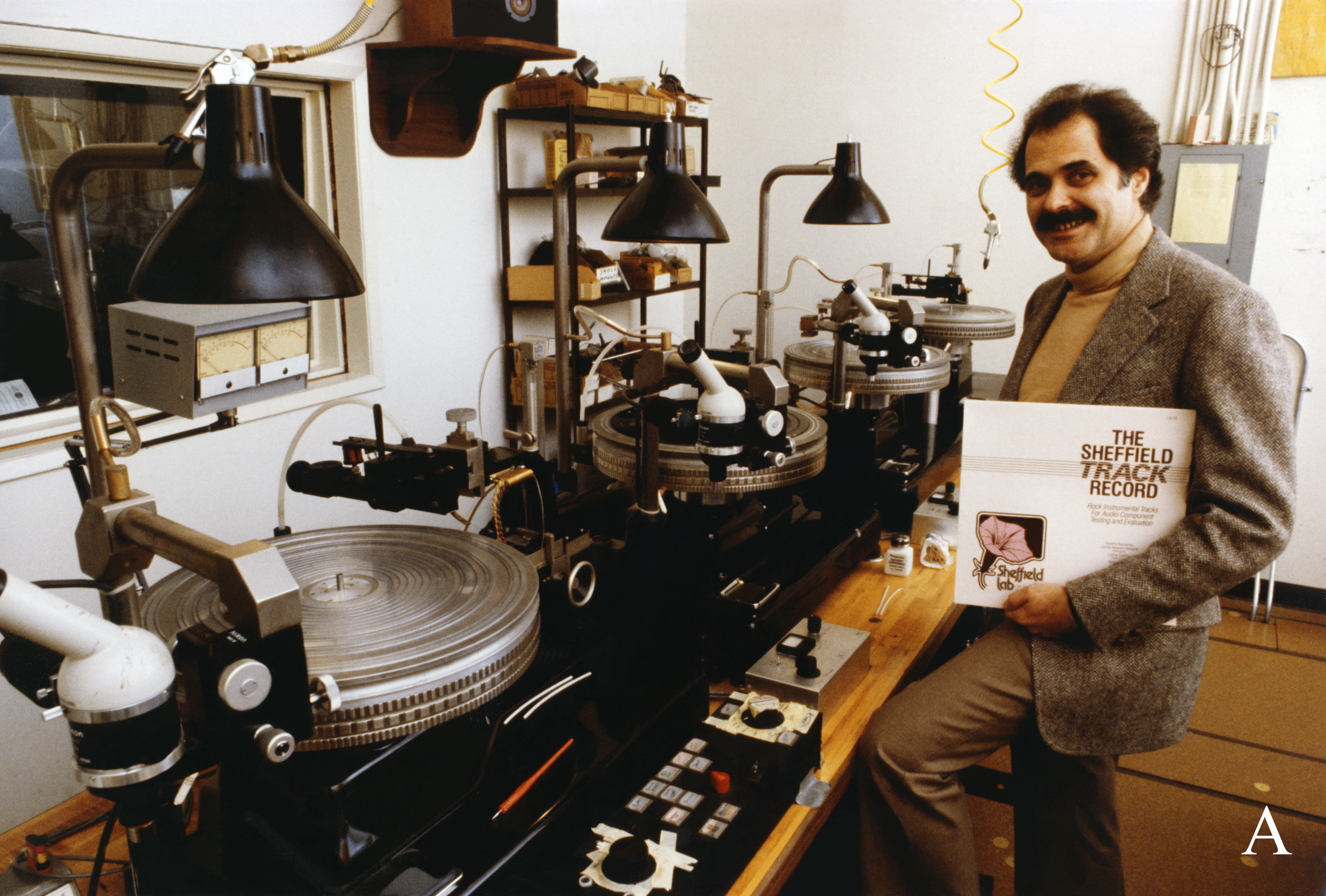
Doug Sax with 4 Lathes

From an early age, Sax was interested in recorded sound, and although he had established a career as a symphonic trumpeter, on December 27, 1967, along with Lincoln Mayorga, a friend from junior high who had become a music arranger and pianist for Capitol Records, and Sax's older brother Sherwood (Bert), an engineer, he opened The Mastering Lab. One of the first big albums Sax mastered at The Mastering Lab was The Doors' debut album which was inducted into the Library of Congress on March 25, 2015.

The Mastering Lab uses equipment designed by Sherwood, which features handcrafted electronics, from the tape machines to the equalizers, compressors / limiters, A/D - D/A converters, and monitoring amplifiers. That, combined with his ears and expertise, helped Sax forge a long and successful career at The Mastering Lab.

In the 1970s, he helped establish the audiophile record company Sheffield Lab, with his friend Lincoln Mayorga. Known for their Direct-To-Disk and Live to 2-track recordings, they recorded such artists as Tower of Power, Dave Grusin, Thelma Houston, Harry James, James Newton Howard, Michael Ruff, Pat Coil, and Clair Marlo.

By 1972, Sax was mastering 20% of the top 100 chart in Billboard magazine. Albums mastered by Sax and released in 1971 included such titles as The Who's Who's Next, Harry Nilsson's Nilsson Schmilsson, The Rolling Stones' Sticky Fingers and the Eagles' self-titled debut album. During his career, Sax cut thousands of LP masters with his custom designed, all-tube signal path including Pink Floyd's The Wall (and all subsequent Pink Floyd releases up to 2014's The Endless River), the reissue of the Slayer thrash metal group's Vinyl Conflict box set and Pantera vinyl reissues, the Eagles' Greatest Hits, and Brian Wilson Reimagines Gershwin.

== Death ==
Sax died in Los Angeles on April 2, 2015, aged 78, from cancer.

Recording engineer and producer Al Schmitt released a statement on Sax's death:

Sorry to say but one of my dearest friends and in my opinion the greatest mastering engineer in the world passed away this morning. He mastered all of my recordings and I don't know what I will do without him. He taught me so many things. I will miss his silly jokes and the great lunches we had whenever I was mastering with him. I love you Doug Sax, mastering in heaven just got a lot better.

== Selected works ==
- 1967 Lincoln Mayorga and Distinguished Colleagues - Lincoln Mayorga
- 1967 The Doors - The Doors
- 1967 Absolutely Free - Frank Zappa
- 1970 Morrison Hotel - The Doors
- 1971 Fillmore East: June 1971 Frank Zappa
- 1971 L.A. Woman - The Doors
- 1971 Sticky Fingers- The Rolling Stones
- 1971 Who's Next - The Who
- 1971 Nilsson Schmilsson - Harry Nilsson
- 1971 Songs for Beginners - Graham Nash
- 1972 Exile on Main St. - The Rolling Stones
- 1972 No Secrets - Carly Simon
- 1972 Will the Circle Be Unbroken - Nitty Gritty Dirt Band
- 1973 Crazy Eyes - Poco
- 1973 Living in the Material World - George Harrison
- 1973 Muscle of Love - Alice Cooper
- 1973 Ringo - Ringo Starr
- 1973 Takin' My Time - Bonnie Raitt
- 1974 Seven - Poco
- 1974 The Way We Were - Barbra Streisand
- 1975 Ambrosia - Ambrosia
- 1975 Andrew Gold - Andrew Gold
- 1975 Equinox - Styx
- 1975 Prisoner in Disguise - Linda Ronstadt
- 1975 Toys in the Attic - Aerosmith
- 1975 The Who by Numbers - The Who
- 1976 Chicago X - Chicago
- 1976 Breezin' - George Benson
- 1976 Glow - Al Jarreau
- 1976 Silk Degrees - Boz Scaggs
- 1976 The Art of Tea - Michael Franks
- 1977 A Place in the Sun - Pablo Cruise
- 1977 Running on Empty - Jackson Browne
- 1978 David Gilmour - David Gilmour (the 2006 remaster)
- 1978 Studio Tan - Frank Zappa
- 1978 You Don't Bring Me Flowers - Neil Diamond
- 1979 The Glow - Bonnie Raitt
- 1979 The Wall - Pink Floyd
- 1980 Mad Love - Linda Ronstadt
- 1980 Stand in the Fire - Warren Zevon
- 1980 The Jazz Singer - Neil Diamond
- 1981 A Collection of Great Dance Songs - Pink Floyd
- 1981 The Brothers Johnson - Winners
- 1981 El Rayo-X - David Lindley
- 1981 Mistaken Identity - Kim Carnes
- 1982 All Four One - The Motels
- 1982 Desire - Tom Scott
- 1982 Get Closer - Linda Ronstadt
- 1982 It's Hard - The Who
- 1982 Toto IV - Toto
- 1982 Voyeur - Kim Carnes
- 1982 Win This Record - David Lindley & El Rayo-X
- 1982 ...Famous Last Words... - Supertramp
- 1983 Caught in the Game - Survivor
- 1983 The Final Cut - Pink Floyd
- 1983 What's New - Linda Ronstadt
- 1984 Building the Perfect Beast - Don Henley
- 1984 Love Language - Teddy Pendergrass
- 1984 Lush Life - Linda Ronstadt
- 1984 About Face - David Gilmour
- 1984 The Pros and Cons of Hitch Hiking - Roger Waters
- 1985 Whitney Houston - Whitney Houston
- 1986 'Round Midnight with Nelson Riddle and His Orchestra - Linda Ronstadt
- 1986 Double Vision - Bob James
- 1986 Every Beat of My Heart - Rod Stewart
- 1986 For Sentimental Reasons - Linda Ronstadt
- 1986 Innocent Eyes - Graham Nash
- 1986 Lives in the Balance - Jackson Browne
- 1986 Nine Lives - Bonnie Raitt
- 1986 Tutu - Miles Davis
- 1987 A Momentary Lapse of Reason - Pink Floyd
- 1987 Canciones de Mi Padre - Linda Ronstadt
- 1987 Collaboration - George Benson & Earl Klugh
- 1987 In My Tribe - 10,000 Maniacs
- 1987 I Prefer the Moonlight - Kenny Rogers
- 1988 Back to Avalon - Kenny Loggins
- 1988 Let It Go - Clair Marlo
- 1988 Everything - The Bangles
- 1988 Old 8×10 - Randy Travis
- 1988 One More Story - Peter Cetera
- 1988 Other Roads - Boz Scaggs
- 1988 Power - Tower of Power
- 1988 Delicate Sound of Thunder - Pink Floyd
- 1988 See the Light - Jeff Healey
- 1988 Slow Turning - John Hiatt
- 1988 The Seventh One - Toto
- 1988 This Note's for You - Neil Young
- 1988 Very Greasy - David Lindley
- 1989 Amandla - Miles Davis
- 1989 New Pants - Flim & the BB's
- 1989 Nick of Time - Bonnie Raitt
- 1989 Spellbound - Joe Sample
- 1989 World in Motion - Jackson Browne
- 1990 Ashes to Ashes - Joe Sample
- 1990 The Language of Life - Everything but the Girl
- 1990 Blue Pacific - Michael Franks
- 1990 Heroes and Friends - Randy Travis
- 1990 Inside Out - Chick Corea Elektric Band
- 1990 Neck and Neck - Chet Atkins
- 1990 Ringo Starr and His All-Starr Band - Ringo Starr
- 1990 Some People's Lives - Bette Midler
- 1990 That's What - Leo Kottke
- 1991 Back Home Again - Kenny Rogers
- 1991 Carry On - Patti Austin
- 1991 Divinyls - Divinyls
- 1991 For the Boys - Bette Midler
- 1991 Great Big Boy - Leo Kottke
- 1991 Hard at Play - Huey Lewis and the News
- 1991 Leap of Faith - Kenny Loggins
- 1991 Luck of the Draw - Bonnie Raitt
- 1991 Monster on a Leash - Tower of Power
- 1991 Shake Me Up - Little Feat
- 1991 The Prince of Tides - James Newton Howard
- 1991 Warm Your Heart - Aaron Neville
- 1992 Amused to Death - Roger Waters
- 1992 Home for Christmas - Amy Grant
- 1992 Joshua Judges Ruth - Lyle Lovett
- 1992 Shine On - Pink Floyd
- 1992 Vulgar Display of Power - Pantera (2012 reissue)
- 1993 Across the Borderline - Willie Nelson
- 1993 A Single Woman - Nina Simone
- 1993 Breaking Silence - Janis Ian
- 1993 Duets - Frank Sinatra
- 1993 I'm Alive - Jackson Browne
- 1993 Live - James Taylor
- 1993 Stepping Out - Diana Krall
- 1993 Thousand Roads - David Crosby
- 1993 Time for Mercy - Jann Arden
- 1993 Traffic from Paradise - Rickie Lee Jones
- 1993 Unknown Road - Pennywise
- 1993 Unplugged...and Seated - Rod Stewart
- 1993 What's Love Got to Do With It - Tina Turner
- 1994 After the Storm - Crosby, Stills & Nash
- 1994 Cohen Live - Leonard Cohen
- 1994 The Division Bell - Pink Floyd (with James Guthrie)
- 1994 Crimson and Blue - Phil Keaggy
- 1994 Have a Little Faith - Joe Cocker
- 1994 I Love Everybody - Lyle Lovett
- 1994 Pink Floyd back catalog remastering
- 1994 Peter Frampton - Peter Frampton
- 1994 Rhythm of Love - Anita Baker
- 1994 This is Me - Randy Travis
- 1995 Feels Like Home - Linda Ronstadt
- 1995 Only Trust Your Heart - Diana Krall
- 1995 PULSE - Pink Floyd
- 1996 In My Lifetime - Neil Diamond
- 1996 Jo Dee Messina - Jo Dee Messina
- 1996 Peace on Earth - Kitaro
- 1996 Signs of Life - Steven Curtis Chapman
- 1996 The Road to Ensenada - Lyle Lovett
- 1996 Broken China - Rick Wright
- 1997 1+1 - Herbie Hancock and Wayne Shorter
- 1997 Across from Midnight - Joe Cocker
- 1997 American Landscape - David Benoit
- 1997 Artist of My Soul - Sandi Patty
- 1997 East West - Julia Fordham
- 1997 Everywhere - Tim McGraw
- 1997 Love Among the Ruins - 10,000 Maniacs
- 1997 Love Scenes - Diana Krall
- 1997 Message for Albert - Five for Fighting
- 1997 So Long So Wrong - Alison Krauss & Union Station
- 1997 Kyle Vincent - Kyle Vincent
- 1998 Faith - Faith Hill
- 1998 Gaia - Kitaro
- 1998 Hell Among the Yearlings - Gillian Welch
- 1998 I'm Alright - Jo Dee Messina
- 1998 Sittin' On Top of the World - LeAnn Rimes
- 1998 Trio II - Emmylou Harris
- 1999 Breathe - Faith Hill
- 1999 Forget About It - Alison Krauss
- 1999 One Guitar, No Vocals - Leo Kottke
- 1999 The Grass Is Blue - Dolly Parton
- 1999 The Song Lives On - Lalah Hathaway
- 1999 The Whole SHeBANG - SHeDAISY
- 1999 Tight Rope - Brooks & Dunn
- 1999 Twenty Four Seven - Tina Turner
- 2000 In the Flesh – Live - Roger Waters
- 2000 Is There Anybody Out There? The Wall Live 1980-81 - Pink Floyd
- 2000 Live at Yoshi's - Dee Dee Bridgewater
- 2000 More Songs from Pooh Corner - Kenny Loggins
- 2000 Nickel Creek - Nickel Creek
- 2001 Big Wide Grin - Keb' Mo'
- 2001 Love, Shelby - Shelby Lynne
- 2001 Outside Inside - The String Cheese Incident
- 2001 Set This Circus Down - Tim McGraw
- 2001 This Way - Jewel
- 2001 Trouble in Shangri-La - Stevie Nicks
- 2001 Echoes: The Best of Pink Floyd - Pink Floyd (with James Guthrie)
- 2002 Alice - Tom Waits
- 2002 At the Movies - Sting
- 2002 Cry - Faith Hill
- 2002 Home - Dixie Chicks
- 2002 Songs for Survivors - Graham Nash
- 2002 This Is New - Dee Dee Bridgewater
- 2003 A Thousand Kisses Deep - Chris Botti
- 2003 Live - Béla Fleck
- 2003 Smile - Lyle Lovett
- 2004 Crosby & Nash - Graham Nash
- 2004 Genius Loves Company - Ray Charles
- 2004 Heart & Soul - Joe Cocker
- 2004 The Chronicles of Life and Death - Good Charlotte
- 2005 Hillbilly Deluxe - Brooks & Dunn
- 2005 Hope and Desire - Susan Tedeschi
- 2005 Jagged Little Pill Acoustic - Alanis Morissette
- 2005 Jann Arden - Jann Arden
- 2005 Overtime - Lee Ritenour
- 2005 The Great American Songbook - Rod Stewart
- 2006 Like Red on a Rose - Alan Jackson
- 2006 Love, Pain & the Whole Crazy Thing - Keith Urban
- 2006 After The Morning - Cara Dillon
- 2006 On an Island - David Gilmour (with James Guthrie)
- 2007 Grapefruit Moon, the Songs of Tom Waits - Southside Johnny with LaBamba's Jazz Orchestra
- 2007 Dirt Farmer - Levon Helm
- 2008 Solo Acoustic, Vol 1&2 - Jackson Browne
- 2008 Live in Gdańsk - David Gilmour
- 2008 Still Unforgettable - Natalie Cole
- 2009 Anything Goes - Herb Alpert
- 2009 Breakthrough - Colbie Caillat
- 2009 Electric Dirt - Levon Helm
- 2009 Free - Jann Arden
- 2009 Love Is the Answer - Barbra Streisand
- 2010 Live at the Troubadour - Carole King
- 2010 Songs from the Road - Leonard Cohen
- 2011 Midnight Sun - Dee Dee Bridgewater
- 2011 Pink Floyd vinyl remasters of The Dark Side of the Moon, Wish You Were Here and The Wall
- 2012 Kisses on the Bottom - Paul McCartney
- 2013 Back to Brooklyn - Barbra Streisand
- 2014 Live in Dublin - Leonard Cohen
- 2014 Croz - David Crosby
- 2014 The Endless River - Pink Floyd (vinyl edition)
- 2015 Shadows in the Night - Bob Dylan

== Awards ==
Grammy Awards

- 2004 - Technical Grammy Award
- 2005 - Grammy Award for Best 5.1 Surround Sound Album for Genius Loves Company
- 2005 - Grammy Award for Album of the Year for Genius Loves Company
- 2005 - Grammy Award for Record of the Year for Genius Loves Company

TEC Awards Sax has been nominated seven times for the Mix Foundation TEC Awards for Creative Achievement, winning twice for:

- 2002 - Record Production/Album - Look of Love, Diana Krall
- 2005 - Record Production/Album - Genius Loves Company, Ray Charles

AES (Audio Engineer Society) Lifetime Honorary Membership Award
