= Billy Williams (record producer) =

Biily Williams
- Born: Billy Wayne Williams
- Origin: Muskegeon, Michigan
- Genres: Country
- Occupations: Record producer Arranger; Session player
- Instrument: Guitar
- Years active: 1958–present
- Formerly of: Lyle Lovett and His Large Band; David Sloan and the Rogues; The Crackerjacks

Billy Williams is an American producer, arranger, and guitarist. He is most known for his production work with Lyle Lovett, sharing a 1997 Best Country Album Grammy award with Lovett as producers of The Road To Ensenada.

== Early life ==
Billy Wayne Williams was born in Muskegon, Michigan. His early music influences were big band country swing and jazz. Williams moved to Arizona in 1958 at the age of 21 after serving in the Army. Stationed in Germany, he had played in a swing band, the Crackerjacks; Tompall Glaser was a member of the band. They tried to keep the band together, meeting in Phoenix, but it didn't hold; only Williams remained in Arizona.

== Career ==
During his first years in Phoenix he played in many clubs and in many bands, keeping busy as a record producer, arranger and session player. In 1966 he started playing for a country band, the Rogues, and played with them for 24 years. The last 20 years were as the house band for the West Phoenix nightclub, Mr. Lucky's.

The Rogues played at the 1983 Schueberfouer funfair in Luxembourg. One of the events at the fair was an American musical tent; the owner of that event was a fan of the now J. David Sloan and the Rogues, and invited them. Lovett was also at the same event, by himself, doing acoustic numbers between other acts, largely ignored, and running out of money. Lovett was invited by Williams to sit in with the group, which learned some of his songs. Their swing and harmony opened Lovett's eyes to what his songs could sound like with proper backing; Lovett had never sung with a band before. Sloan and Williams offered Lovett a deal on studio time, first day free. In 1984 Lovett took them up on the offer. Williams rounded up the Rogues and other Phoenix talent to work with Lovett, including Francine Reed. After several stays in Arizona over that summer he recorded 18 songs. The demo tape of the first four songs led to his first record deal; ten of those songs, recorded with the Rogues, became Lovett's self-titled debut album. In addition to Williams, several of the Phoenicians, including Ray Herndon, Matt McKenzie, Matt Rollings, and Reed went on to play in his band. Williams played guitar on several of the early albums and produced or co-produced all of his albums through 2007. In 1990 Williams left the Rogues to work with Lovett. MCA country record producer Tony Brown noted that sometimes people play key roles in artists' music; for Lovett, "Billy was a big part of that."

In addition to his five decades of producing selected other credits include:

=== Arranger ===
- World Champion Lover, 1968, Jackie Stewart
- Marry Me, 1970, Ron Lowry
- Heart Healer, 1977, Mel Tillis
- Lyle Lovett (album) 1986, Lyle Lovett
- Fourth World, 2002, R. Carlos Nakai

=== Guitarist ===
- Wanda Jackson - In Person Live At "Mr Lucky's" In Phoenix Arizona, 1969
- The Great Tompall and His Outlaw Band, 1976
- Are You Sincere, 1979
- Pontiac, 1987
- Runaway Heart, 2021

== Honors ==
Arizona Music and Entertainment Hall of Fame
