= Smile: Songs from the Movies =

Compilation album by Lyle Lovett
- Released: Feb 25, 2003 (US); Mar 10, 2003 (UK)
- Recorded: 1992–2002
- Genre: Traditional pop; R&B; gospel
- Label: MCA/Curb

Lyle Lovett chronology
Anthology, Vol. 1: Cowboy Man (2001)	Smile: Songs from the Movies (2003)	My Baby Don't Tolerate (2003)

Professional ratings
Review scores
Source	Rating
Allmusic	2.5/5 stars
PopMatters	mixed

Smile: Songs from the Movies is a 2003 compilation of songs performed by Lyle Lovett for various movie soundtracks between 1992 and 2002. Smile was the fifth project by Lovett that did not introduce a new collection of his own songs during the expanse of time between his 1996 Grammy winning The Road to Ensenada and My Baby Don't Tolerate (released later in 2003). Other projects included a 1998 cover album, a 1999 live album, a 2000 movie soundtrack, and a 2001 anthology. The release of Smile led some reviewers to speculate the Lovett might be experiencing some sort of writer's block. Another possibility is that Lovett was taking it easy following a 2002 injury from an accident involving a bull on a family farm in Texas. During the incident Lovett's leg was broken in 20 places. A fracture to his thumb also left him unable to play guitar for an extended period.

The album has been described as a "nice listen" and "nice for collectors" to find all of these songs together, but "not essential," and "uneven."

== Charts ==
Smile peaked at 106 in the Billboard Hot 200, and reached 136 on Billboard's Top Internet Albums chart.

== Track listing ==
1. "Blue Skies" (Berlin) – 3:11
  - From With Honors, 1994
2. "Straighten Up and Fly Right" (Cole, Mills) – 3:10
  - From Dear God, 1996
3. "Gee Baby, Ain't I Good to You" (Razaf, Redman) – 4:58
  - From Kissing Jessica Stein, 2001
4. "Smile" (Chaplin, Parsons, Turner) – 3:38
  - From Hope Floats, 1998
5. "Moritat (Mack the Knife)" (Brecht, Weill) – 4:43
  - From Quiz Show, 1994
6. "Summer Wind" (Bradtke, Heinz Meier, Mercer) – 2:53
  - From For Love of the Game (film), 1999
7. "What'd I Say" (Charles) – 4:00
  - From Where the Heart Is, 2000
8. "Till It Shines" (Seger) – 3:50
  - From Mumford, 1999
  - Performed with Keb' Mo'
9. "You've Got a Friend in Me" (Newman) – 2:39
  - From Toy Story, 1995
  - Performed with Randy Newman
10. "Walking Tall" (Bacharach, Rice) – 3:13
  - From Stuart Little, 1999
11. "Pass Me Not" (Crosby, Doane) – 5:00
  - From Leap of Faith, 1992
12. "I'm a Soldier in the Army of the Lord" (traditional) – 3:29
  - From The Apostle, 1998

== Chart performance ==
Chart (2003)	Peak position
US Billboard 200	106
