= I Love Everybody =

Studio album by Lyle Lovett
- Released: Sept 27, 1994
- Recorded: Aug 31, 1993 – Jan 12, 1994
- Length: 52:41
- Label: Curb/MCA
- Producers: Lyle Lovett & Billy Williams

Lyle Lovett chronology
Joshua Judges Ruth (1992)	I Love Everybody (1994)	The Road to Ensenada (1996)

Professional ratings
Review scores
Source	Rating
Allmusic	4/5 stars
Audio	
New York Times	(favorable)
Rolling Stone	4/5 stars
Stereo Review	(favorable)
Spin Alternative Record Guide	6/10

I Love Everybody is the fifth album by Lyle Lovett, released in 1994. The album consists of Lovett's early songs penned prior to the recording of his first album, Lyle Lovett (1986).

On the 8th track, "Record Lady," Lyle refers to college friend and fellow musician, Robert Earl Keen.

...Robert Earl, he's a friend of mine
You know he's always looking out for my best interest...

Several songs prominently feature one or more of Lovett's trademark penchants: wry humor ("Sonja"), playful surrealism ("Penguins"), cod misanthropy ("They don't like me"), and disturbing frankness ("Creeps Like Me"). Even the album's title, ("I Love Everybody"), is ironic.

Lovett's wife at the time, Julia Roberts, provides backing vocals on two tracks. Other performers lending their voices include Rickie Lee Jones and Leo Kottke.

"Ain't It Something" would later be rerecorded, in a longer form, for Lovett's soundtrack to the 2000 film Dr. T & the Women.

== Track listing ==
All songs by Lyle Lovett, except "Fat Babies" by Lyle Lovett and Eric Taylor

No.	Title	Length
1.	"Skinny Legs"	2:42
2.	"Fat Babies"	2:54
3.	"I Think You Know What I Mean"	3:05
4.	"Hello Grandma"	2:35
5.	"Creeps Like Me"	2:14
6.	"Sonja"	2:00
7.	"They Don't Like Me"	2:34
8.	"Record Lady"	4:11
9.	"Ain't It Somethin'"	2:14
10.	"Penguins"	2:31
11.	"The Fat Girl"	2:00
12.	"La to the Left"	3:20
13.	"Old Friend"	3:13
14.	"Just the Morning"	4:23
15.	"Moon on My Shoulder"	2:20
16.	"I've Got the Blues"	3:34
17.	"Good-Bye to Carolina"	3:28
18.	"I Love Everybody"	3:39

== Personnel ==
- Lyle Lovett – vocals, guitar
- Kenny Aronoff – drums
- Russ Kunkel – drums, percussion
- John Leftwich – bass
- Edgar Meyer – bass, string arrangements
- Joel Derouin – violin
- Berj Garabedian – violin
- Mark O'Connor – violin (tracks 3, 6, 12, 14, 16, & 17)
- Sid Page – violin, concertmaster
- Claudia Parducci – violin, background vocals
- Barbara Porter – violin
- Larry Corbett – cello
- John Hagen – cello, background vocals
- Suzie Katayama – cello
- Steve Richards – cello
- Daniel Smith – cello
- Lee Thornburg – trumpet
- Sweet Pea Atkinson – background vocals
- Sir Harry Bowens – background vocals
- Lt. Col. L.H. "Bucky" Burruss – background vocals
- Willie Green Jr. – background vocals
- Paul Halperin – background vocals
- Walter Hyatt – background vocals
- Rickie Lee Jones – background vocals (tracks 2 & 18)
- Jim Kerr – background vocals
- Leo Kottke – background vocals (tracks 2 & 18)
- Nathaniel Kunkel – background vocals
- Ken Levitan – background vocals
- Arnold McCuller – background vocals
- Gil Morales – background vocals
- Herb Pedersen – background vocals
- Willis Alan Ramsey – background vocals
- Julia Roberts – background vocals (tracks 2 & 18)
- Harry Stinson – background vocals
- Eric Taylor – background vocals

== Production notes ==
- Produced by Lyle Lovett & Billy Williams
- Nathaniel Kunkel – engineer, mixing
- Gil Morales – engineer
- Doug Sax – mastering
- Marsha Burns – project coordinator
- Tim Stedman – art direction, design
- Jonas Livingston – art direction

== Chart performance ==
Chart (1994)	Peak position
Canadian RPM Top Albums	40
New Zealand Albums Chart	36
UK Albums Chart	54
US Billboard 200	26
