= Still the King (album) =

Still the King: Celebrating the Music of Bob Wills and His Texas Playboys

Compilation album by Asleep at the Wheel
- Released: March 3, 2015
- Genre: Western Swing, Country
- Length: 1:10:29
- Label: Proper
- Producer: Ray Benson; Sam Seifert

Asleep at the Wheel chronology
It's a Good Day (2010)	Still the King: Celebrating the Music of Bob Wills and His Texas Playboys (2015)

Professional ratings
Aggregate scores
Source	Rating
Metacritic	82/100
Review scores
Source	Rating
AllMusic	4/5 stars

Still the King: Celebrating the Music of Bob Wills and His Texas Playboys is a tribute album by American country group Asleep at the Wheel in memory of Bob Wills and the Texas Playboys. It was released in March 2015 under Proper Records.

== Track listing ==
No.	Title	Guest Performer	Length
1.	"Texas Playboys Theme"	Leon Rausch	1:13
2.	"I Hear Ya Talkin'"	Amos Lee	3:28
3.	"The Girl I Left Behind Me"	The Avett Brothers	2:31
4.	"Trouble in Mind"	Lyle Lovett	4:07
5.	"Keeper of My Heart"	Merle Haggard and Emily Gimble	3:32
6.	"I Can't Give You Anything but Love"	Kat Edmonson and Ray Benson	3:18
7.	"Tiger Rag"	Old Crow Medicine Show	2:55
8.	"What's the Matter With the Mill"	Pokey LaFarge	3:06
9.	"Navajo Trail"	Willie Nelson and The Quebe Sisters	3:05
10.	"Silver Dew on the Blue Grass Tonight"	Del McCoury Band	3:27
11.	"Faded Love"	The Time Jumpers	4:20
12.	"South of the Border (Down Mexico Way)"	George Strait	4:13
13.	"I Had Someone Else Before I Had You"	Elizabeth Cook	2:45
14.	"My Window Faces the South"	Brad Paisley	2:32
15.	"Time Changes Everything"	Buddy Miller	3:37
16.	"A Good Man Is Hard to Find"	Carrie Rodriguez and Emily Gimble	2:36
17.	"Ding Dong Daddy from Dumas"	Robert Earl Keen and Ray Benson	3:25
18.	"Brain Cloudy Blues"	Jamey Johnson and Ray Benson	4:20
19.	"Bubbles in My Beer"	Devil Makes Three	2:38
20.	"It's All Your Fault"	Katie Shore	2:54
21.	"Twin Guitar Special"	Tommy Emmanuel, Brent Mason and Billy Briggs	4:04
22.	"Bob Wills Is Still the King"	Shooter Jennings, Randy Rogers and Reckless Kelly	2:23

== Commercial performance ==
The album debuted on the Top Country Albums chart at No. 14 and No. 187 on the Billboard 200, selling 3,900 for the week in the US. It rose to No. 11 on the Top Country Albums chart in its third week, selling 8,600 in three weeks. The album has sold 24,600 copies in the US as of August 2015.

== Charts ==
Chart (2015)	Peak position
US Billboard 200	187
US Top Country Albums (Billboard)	11
US Independent Albums (Billboard)	14
