= Dr. T & the Women (album) =

Soundtrack album by Lyle Lovett
- Released: September 26, 2000
- Studio: Conway Recording Studios, Hollywood, California
- Length: 50:00
- Label: MCA
- Producer: Lyle Lovett & Billy Williams

Lyle Lovett chronology
Live in Texas (1999)	Dr. T & the Women (2000)	Anthology, Vol. 1: Cowboy Man (2001)

Professional ratings
Review scores
Source	Rating
Allmusic	2/5 stars

Dr. T & the Women is the soundtrack to Robert Altman's film, Dr. T & the Women. All tracks are instrumentals except, "Ain't It Somethin'," "You've Been So Good Up Till Now" and "She's Already Made Up Her Mind." "Ain't It Something" is a rerecording of a song from Lovett's 1994 album I Love Everybody, while "You've Been So Good Up Till Now" and "She's Already Made Up Her Mind" were previously released on his 1992 album Joshua Judges Ruth.

== Track listing ==
No.	Title	Writer(s)	Length
1.	"Dr. T's Theme"	Lyle Lovett, Matt Rollings, and Viktor Krauss	3:18
2.	"Opening Credits"	Lovett, Rollings, and Krauss	3:56
3.	"Mall Women"	Lovett	2:40
4.	"The Fountain"	Lovett, Rollings, and Krauss	2:19
5.	"The Bree Shuffle"	Lovett, Rollings, and Krauss	3:06
6.	"Golf Cart Love"	Lovett, Rollings, and Krauss	3:01
7.	"The Bridal Shower"	Lovett, Rollings, and Krauss	1:40
8.	"You've Been So Good Up Till Now"	Lovett	4:14
9.	"She's Already Made Up Her Mind"	Lovett	4:49
10.	"Lady Of The Lake"	Lovett, Rollings, and Krauss	2:26
11.	"Dr. T's Theme (Reprise)"	Lovett, Rollings, and Krauss	2:57
12.	"The Screen Door"	Lovett, Rollings, and Krauss	1:31
13.	""The Wedding""	Lovett, Rollings, and Krauss	3:26
14.	""Go Away With Me""	Lovett, Rollings, and Krauss	1:32
15.	"The Crash"	Lovett, Rollings, and Krauss	3:47
16.	"Ain't It Somethin'"	Lovett	5:18

== Personnel ==
- Sweet Pea Atkinson – backing vocals
- Pat Bergeson – electric guitar
- Sir Harry Bowens – backing vocals
- Debra Byrd – backing vocals
- Stuart Duncan – fiddle
- Gene Elders – pre-production
- Paul Franklin – steel guitar
- James Gilmer – percussion
- Al Gramling – assistant engineer
- William "Bill" Greene – backing vocals
- Robert Hadley – assistant mastering engineer
- John Hagen – cello
- Ray Herndon – rhythm guitar
- Viktor Krauss – bass
- Nathaniel Kunkel – engineer, mixing
- Russ Kunkel – drums
- Helena Lea – music supervisor
- Lyle Lovett – acoustic guitar, composer, vocals, producer
- Arnold McCuller – backing vocals
- Dean Parks – rhythm guitar
- John Richards – engineer
- Matt Rollings – piano
- Doug Sax – mastering
- Johnny Lee Schell – electric guitar
- Leland Sklar – bass
- Kathi Whitley – project coordinator
- Billy Williams – producer
