= Ain't No More Cane =

Traditional prison work song of the Southern United States

"Ain't No More Cane on the Brazos" (/ˈbræzəs/ BRAZ-əs) is a traditional prison work song of the Southern United States. The title and lyrics allude to prison work gangs cutting sugar cane as hard labor along the banks of the Brazos River in Texas, where many of the state's prison farms were located in the late nineteenth and early twentieth centuries.

The song has been recorded and covered many times, including by Alan Lomax, The Band, and Bob Dylan. It is sometimes attributed to Lead Belly (Huddie Ledbetter); while he did make several recordings of a short version of it, titled "Go Down, Ol' Hannah", the song did not originate with him and most versions sung are not derived specifically from his lyrics. Lomax understood its source to be the Texas prison community.

The song relates the harsh conditions of prison labor on the Brazos: the narrator contemplates making an escape and describes members of the work gang succumbing to exhaustion, wind chill, and heat stroke, linking the prospect of their rising again to the rising of the sun (called "Old Hannah") and the coming of the Last Judgment: "If you rise any more, bring Judgment Day [with you]." Some versions of the song contain the line "Wake up, dead man", which is the source of the name of folklorist Bruce Jackson's 1972 work Wake Up Dead Man: Afro-American Worksongs from Texas Prisons (later re-subtitled: Hard Labor and Southern Blues); it also inspired the title of Rian Johnson's 2025 film Wake Up Dead Man.

== Recordings ==
The song was first recorded in 1933 by John and Alan Lomax, and featured Ernest Williams, James “Iron Head” Baker, and other prisoners singing the song at the Central State Prison Farm at Sugar Land, Texas, near the Brazos River, southwest of Houston. It has been recorded by Alan Lomax on his 1958 recording Texas Folk Songs Sung by Alan Lomax as "Ain't No More Cane on This Brazis", Odetta, Lonnie Donegan, the Limeliters on their album 14 14K Folksongs (1963), Son Volt on the album A Retrospective: 1995-2000, and The Band on the album Across the Great Divide. Bob Dylan also performed the song live in the early 1960s and his version is on multiple bootleg recordings taken from The Gaslight Cafe. An extensive set of lyrics to the song, as sung by inmates of Central State Farm near Houston, Texas, appears in folklorist John Lomax's book American Ballads and Folk Songs, originally published in 1934. Lomax collected another version of the song in a recording of a performance by Ernest Williams and James (Iron Head) Baker; the recording appears on the Document Records album Field Recordings, Vol. 6: Texas (1933-1958).

In 2006, Band of Heathens with their distinctive arrangement included it on their Live at Momo's album. In 2007 Lyle Lovett released two versions of the tune on his album It's Not Big, It's Large. On February 16, 2008, Lovett and John Hiatt performed the song live at the Ulster Performing Arts Center in Kingston, New York, along with The Band's Garth Hudson. On February 14, 2013, Lovett also performed this song with friend Robert Earl Keen at Rudder Auditorium on the campus of their Alma mater, Texas A&M University.

"Ain't No More Cane" is featured in the film Festival Express, where Rick Danko, Janis Joplin, John "Marmaduke" Dawson, Jerry Garcia, Bob Weir, and various other musicians drunkenly sing it while on the train going to the next concert on the tour.

The song, as "No More Cane on the Brazos", was also covered by the singer Ian Gillan of Deep Purple fame for his 1990 solo-album Naked Thunder. The Chad Mitchell Trio recorded the song on their 1963 album Singin' our Mind. Other covers include The Black Crowes. Chris Smither also covered "No More Cane on the Brazos" on his 1998 CD "Happier Blue". Bill Staines recorded the song on his 1975 album Miles.

It was also covered by Lonnie Donnegan in 1958 and by Canadian band Crowbar on Larger than Life (And Live'r than You've Ever Been) (1971, Daffodil 2-SBA-16007) (recorded in concert at Massey Hall, Toronto, Ontario, Canada). A version of this song is also recorded by The Wood Brothers on their live album Live Vol.2 Nail & Tooth. The song's lyric "Captain don't you do me like you done poor old Shine" was the inspiration for Poor Old Shine, the previous band name for the band Parsonsfield.

The song has also been covered by the band The Magpie Salute, consisting of former Black Crowes members Rich Robinson, Marc Ford, and Sven Pipien. It can be found on their mostly live debut album, "The Magpie Salute".

== Lyrics ==
The lyrics as reported by Alan Lomax in 1966 are as follows:

Original lyrics It ain' no mo' cane on de Brazis, Done groun' it all in molazzis. Better git yo' overcoat ready, Well, it's comin' up a norther. Well, de captain standin' an' lookin' an' cryin', Well, it's gittin' so col', my row's behin'. Cap'n, doncha do me like you did po' Shine, Drive dat bully till he went stone-blin'. Cap'n, cap'n, you mus' be blin', Keep on holl'in' an' I'm almos' flyin'. One o' dese mornin's, an' it won' be long, You gonna call me an' I'll be gone. Ninety-nine years so jumpin' long, To be here rollin' an' cain' go home. Ef I had a sentence like ninety-nine years, All de dogs on de Brazis won' keep me here. I b'lieve I'll go to de Brazis line, Ef I leave you here, gonna think I's flyin'. B'lieve I'll do like ol' Riley, Ol' Riley walked de Brazis. Well, de dog-sergeant got worried an' couldn' go, Ol' Rattler went to howlin' 'cause de tracks too ol'. Oughta come on de river in 1904, You could fin' a dead man on every turn row. Oughta come on de river in 1910, Dey was drivin' de women des like de men. Wake up, dead man, an' help me drive my row, Wake up, dead man, an' help me drive my row. Some in de buildin' an' some on de farm, Some in de graveyard, some goin' home. I looked at my Ol' Hannah, an' she's turnin' red, I looked at my podner an' he's almos' dead. Wake up, lifetime, hold up yo' head, Well, you may get a pardon an' you may drop dead. Well, I wonder what's de matter, somepin' mus' be wrong, We're still here rollin', Shorty George done gone. Go down, Ol' Hannah, doncha rise no mo', Ef you rise any mo' bring judgment day.	Standardized There ain't no more cane on the Brazos; They've done ground it all into molasses. You'd better get your overcoat ready; Well, it's coming up a norther. Well, the captain is standing and looking and crying; Well, it's getting so cold, my row is behind. Captain, don't you do me like you did poor Shine! You drove that bully till he went stone-blind. Captain, captain, you must be blind! You keep on hollering, and I'm almost flying. One of these mornings, and it won't be long, You're going to call me, and I'll be gone. Ninety-nine years is so jumping long To be here rolling, and I can't go home. If I had a sentence like ninety-nine years, All the dogs on the Brazos wouldn't keep me here. I believe I'll go to the Brazos line; If I leave you here, you're going to think I'm flying. I believe I'll do like old Riley: Old Riley walked the Brazos. Well, the dog-sergeant got worried and couldn't go; Old Rattler went to howling because the tracks were too old. You ought to have come on the river in 1904: You could find a dead man on every turn row. You ought to have come on the river in 1910: They were driving the women just like the men. Wake up, dead man, and help me drive my row; Wake up, dead man, and help me drive my row. Some are in the building, and some are on the farm; Some are in the graveyard, and some are going home. I looked at my Old Hannah, and she was turning red; I looked at my partner, and he was almost dead. Wake up, lifetime, hold up your head; Well, you may get a pardon, and you may drop dead. Well, I wonder what's the matter? Something must be wrong: We're still here rolling; Shorty George is done gone. Go down, Old Hannah, don't you rise no more; If you rise any more, bring Judgment Day.

The lyrics to The Band's version, which are partly derived from Lead Belly's "Go Down, Ol' Hannah" version, are as follows:

Ain't no more cane on the Brazos
It's all been ground down to molasses

You shoulda been on the river in 1910
They were driving the women just like they drove the men.

Go down Old Hannah, don'cha rise no more
Don't you rise up til Judgement Day's for sure

Ain't no more cane on the Brazos
It's all been ground down to molasses

Captain don't you do me like you done poor old Shine
Well ya drove that bully til he went stone blind

Wake up on a lifetime, hold up your own head
Well you may get a pardon and then you might drop dead

Ain't no more cane on the Brazos
It's all been ground down to molasses.

A version The Band performed with Bob Dylan on the Basement Tapes includes the following as a second verse:

Shoulda been on the river in nineteen and four
They were finding the dead bodies in every single door.
