= Kat Edmonson =

American singer and songwriter (born 1983)

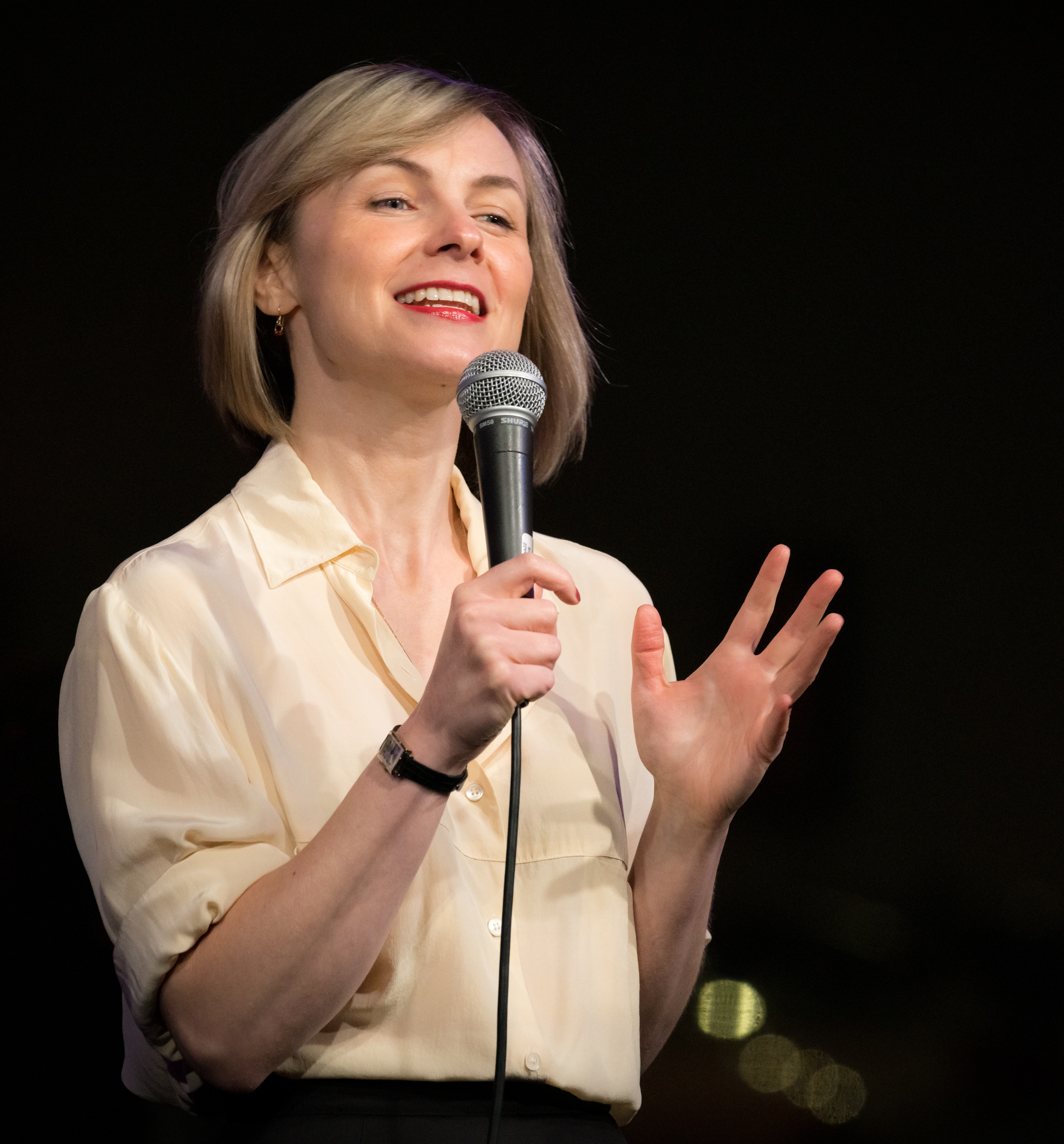
- Edmonson at SFJAZZ in 2021

Background information
- Born: August 3, 1983 (age 43); Houston, Texas
- Genres: Jazz, pop
- Occupations: Singer, songwriter
- Instrument: Vocals
- Years active: 2002–present
- Labels: Sony Masterworks, Convivium, Spinnerette
- Website: www.katedmonson.com

Kat Edmonson (born August 3, 1983) is an American singer and songwriter.

== Biography ==
=== Early life and career ===
Born and raised in Houston, Edmonson is the only child of a single mother who enjoyed songs from the Great American Songbook and traditional pop from the 1940s and '50s. She wrote her first song at age nine while riding the school bus. In 2002, after a year at the College of Charleston in South Carolina, she moved to Austin, Texas, to pursue a music career.

In 2002 Edmonson auditioned for the second season of American Idol and was one of the Top 48 contestants invited to Hollywood. She returned to Austin from Los Angeles and spent several years as a regular in the Austin club scene. She worked briefly in real estate but quit her day job in 2005 making the decision to pursue music full time.

=== Albums ===
In March 2009, her self-released debut album, Take to the Sky, reached the Top 20 on the Billboard magazine jazz chart. Way Down Low was released in 2012 following a successful Kickstarter campaign and received a warm critical reception from The New York Times and NPR, reaching No. 1 on the Billboard Heatseekers chart. Edmonson described Way Down Low's folk, jazz, rock, pop, and country inspired sound as "vintage pop". Her third album, The Big Picture, was released on September 30, 2014, by Sony Masterworks. Like her second album, it reached No. 1 on the Billboard Heatseekers chart.

=== Performing ===
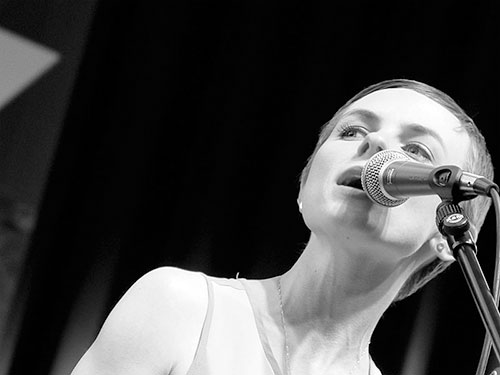
Edmonson performing at the 2013 Aarhus Jazz Festival

She was the main act at the Taichung Jazz Festival in Taiwan, at Tanglewood, and at the New York City Jazz Festival.

In 2010, she was invited by Lyle Lovett to be the opening act for his U.S. summer tour. In December 2010 he invited her to perform "Baby, It's Cold Outside" on The Tonight Show with Jay Leno. Their version of the song was released on Lovett's 2012 album, Release Me. They collaborated on Edmonson's song "Long Way Home" on her second studio album, Way Down Low.

In 2012, Edmonson appeared on NPR's Tiny Desk concert series, Austin City Limits, and in 2013, A Prairie Home Companion. She returned to A Prairie Home Companion in November 2014, reprising the character Cat Mandu that Garrison Keilor wrote for her for the show's regular skit, "Guy Noir, Private Eye."

In the spring of 2013, she embarked on her first U.S. tour. The following summer she played the Montreux Jazz Festival. As the opening act for Jamie Cullum in 2013, she toured France, Germany, the Netherlands, Portugal, Spain, and the UK. She has also toured with Michael Kiwanuka, Chris Isaak, and Gary Clark Jr.

On 20 March 2024 she performed the Sinéad O'Connor song, In This Heart at a tribute concert for O'Connor and Shane MacGowan at Carnegie Hall.

=== TV and film ===
In 2015, Edmonson appeared on one of the final episodes of the Late Show with David Letterman with the band Asleep at the Wheel. She performed "I Can't Give You Anything But Love" to promote the album Still the King, a tribute to Bob Wills.

In Angels Sing (2013), she appeared as herself and sings "Christmas Time Is Here" with Lyle Lovett. In Café Society (2016), directed by Woody Allen, she played the Les Tropiques Night Club singer, performing "Mountain Greenery" and "Jeepers Creepers". Her song "Lucky" was used twice in the movie Admission and over the credits in the Coca-Cola Footprints commercial for the 2014 Winter Olympics, while her song "If" was featured in the first episode of the Netflix show Russian Doll. Her song "Dark Cloud" was used in the opening sequence of the movie Closure.

== Awards ==
- Abe Olman Scholarship Award for Excellence in Songwriting, Songwriters Hall of Fame, 2013

== Discography ==
=== As leader ===
- Take to the Sky (Convivium, 2009)
- Way Down Low (Spinnerette, 2012; Sony Masterworks/OKeh, 2013)
- The Big Picture (Sony Masterworks, 2014)
- Old Fashioned Gal (Spinnerette, 2018)
- Dreamers Do (Spinnerette, 2020)
- Holiday Swingin'! (A Kat Edmonson Christmas, Vol. 1) (Spinnerette, 2021)

=== As guest ===
With Lyle Lovett

- Songs for the Season (2011)
- Release Me (2012)

With others

- Asleep at the Wheel, Still the King (2015)
- Walter Martin, We're All Young Together (2014)
- Miles Zuniga, These Ghosts Have Bones (2011)

== Filmography ==
- Angels Sing, 2013 (guest appearance)
- Café Society, 2016
- Closure, 2018
