= Live in Texas (Lyle Lovett album) =

Live album by Lyle Lovett
- Released: June 29, 1999
- Label: MCA
- Producers: Lyle Lovett & Billy Williams

Lyle Lovett chronology
Step Inside This House (1998)	Live in Texas (1999)	Dr. T & The Women (2000)

Professional ratings
Review scores
Source	Rating
AllMusic	link
Rolling Stone	link

Live in Texas is a live album by American singer Lyle Lovett, recorded in Austin and San Antonio, Texas from August 29 to September 1, 1995, and released on June 29, 1999.

== Track listing ==
All songs composed by Lyle Lovett except as indicated.

1. "Penguins" – 2:35
2. "I've Been to Memphis" – 4:35
3. "That's Right (You're Not from Texas)" (Lovett, Willis Alan Ramsey, Alison Rogers) – 5:06
4. "Nobody Knows Me" – 3:07
5. "If I Had a Boat" – 3:19
6. "North Dakota" featuring Rickie Lee Jones (Lovett, Ramsey) – 6:28
7. "She's No Lady" – 3:43
8. "Here I Am" – 4:16
9. "What Do You Do?" – 2:57
10. "Wild Women Don't Get the Blues" (Ida Cox) – 4:54
11. "M-O-N-E-Y" (Cox) – 3:29
12. "You Can't Resist It" – 5:36
13. "Church" – 5:40
14. "Closing Time" – 4:34

== Personnel ==
- Lyle Lovett – vocals, acoustic guitar
- James Gilmer – percussion
- John Hagen – cello
- Ray Herndon – electric guitar
- Viktor Krauss – bass guitar
- Rickie Lee Jones – harmony vocals on North Dakota
- Arnold McCuller – background vocals
- Francine Reed – background vocals
- Sweet Pea Atkinson – background vocals
- Sir Harry Bowens – background vocals
- Willie Green Jr. – background vocals
- Buck Reid – pedal steel guitar
- Matt Rollings – piano, keyboards
- Charles Rose – trombone
- Harvey Thompson – saxophone
- Steve Marsh – saxophone
- Vinnie Ciesielski – trumpet
- Dan Tomlinson – drums
- Andrea Zonn – fiddle

=== Production ===
- Produced by Lyle Lovett and Billy Williams
- John Richards – engineer
- Nathaniel Kunkel – engineer, mixing
- John Nelson – assistant engineer, mixing assistant
- Mark Wilshire – assistant engineer, mixing, mixing assistant
- Tony Flores – assistant engineer, mixing, mixing assistant
- Doug Sax – mastering
- Ron Lewter – mastering
- Robert Hadley – mastering
- Michael Wilson – photography
- Tim Stedman – design
- Keith Tamashiro – design assistant
- Gary Speakman – tour manager
- Scooter DeLong – backline technician

== Chart performance ==
=== Weekly charts ===
Weekly chart performance for Live in Texas
Chart (1999)	Peak position
Canadian Country Albums (RPM)	14
US Billboard 200	94
US Top Country Albums (Billboard)	7

=== Year-end charts ===
Year-end chart performance for Live in Texas
Chart (1999)	Position
US Top Country Albums (Billboard)	64
