= It's Not Big It's Large =

Studio album by Lyle Lovett and his Large Band
- Released: August 28, 2007
- Length: 58 minutes
- Labels: Curb Records; Lost Highway
- Producer: Billy Williams

Lyle Lovett and his Large Band chronology
My Baby Don't Tolerate (2003)	It's Not Big It's Large (2007)	Natural Forces (2009)

Professional ratings
Review scores
Source	Rating
Allmusic	3/5 stars
Music Box	4/5 stars

It's Not Big It's Large is an album by Lyle Lovett and his Large Band, released in 2007 (see 2007 in music). The recording was made live in studio (recorded with all instruments as if a concert venue, but done in a studio).

The title is a play on the name Lovett has given to his touring band since 1988. Lovett explains the title in an interview: "We've always done arrangements that border on blues music, that border on jazz arrangements, that border on what folks might think of as 'big band', but we don't really play big band music. But we've always had a lot of people in the band so that's why I call the band the 'Large Band' and not the 'Big Band'. But invariably people refer to the band as the 'Big Band' and ... it's not big... you get the idea."

The album debuted at number 18 on the U.S. Billboard 200 chart, selling about 25,000 copies in its first week.

== Track listing ==
1. "Tickle Toe"
2. "I Will Rise Up/Ain't No More Cane"
3. "All Downhill from Here"
4. "Don't Cry a Tear"
5. "South Texas Girl"
6. "This Traveling Around"
7. "Up in Indiana"
8. "The Alley Song"
9. "No Big Deal"
10. "Make It Happy"
11. "Ain't No More Cane"
12. "Up in Indiana" (acoustic)

== Personnel ==
1. "Tickle Toe"
  - Viktor Krauss: bass
  - Russ Kunkel: drums
  - Matt Rollings: piano
  - Dean Parks: electric guitar, first guitar solo
  - Mitch Watkins, electric guitar, second guitar solo
  - Paul Franklin: steel guitar
  - Stuart Duncan: fiddle, fiddle solo
  - Gene Elders: fiddle
  - John Hagen: cello
  - James Gilmer: percussion
  - Dan Higgins: orchestration, alto sax, tenor sax
  - Gary Grant: trumpet
  - Warren Luening: trumpet, trumpet solo
  - William Reichenbach: trombone, bass trumpet solo
  - Steve Marsh: horn arrangement
2. "I Will Rise Up]/Ain't No More Cane"
  - Viktor Krauss: additional horn arrangement, bass
  - Russ Kunkel: drums
  - Matt Rollings: piano
  - Dean Parks and Mitch Watkins: electric guitar
  - Paul Franklin: steel guitar
  - Lyle Lovett: acoustic guitar, vocals
  - Sam Bush: mandolin
  - Gene Elders: fiddle
  - John Hagen: cello
  - James Gilmer: percussion
  - Dan Higgins: orchestration, alto sax, tenor sax
  - Gary Grant, Steve Herman and Jerry Hey: trumpet
  - Andy Martin: trombone
  - Charlie Rose: horn arrangement, trombone
  - Harvey Thompson and Steve Marsh: tenor sax
  - Arnold McCuller, Jason Eskridge, Sweet Pea Atkinson, Harry Bowens and Francine Reed: harmony vocals
3. "All Downhill"
  - Viktor Krauss: bass
  - Russ Kunkel: drums
  - Matt Rollings: piano
  - Ray Herndon and Mitch Watkins: electric guitar
  - Dean Parks: electric baritone guitar
  - Paul Franklin: steel guitar
  - Lyle Lovett: acoustic guitar, vocals
  - Sam Bush: mandolin
  - Stuart Duncan: fiddle
4. "Don't Cry A Tear"
  - Viktor Krauss: bass
  - Russ Kunkel: drums
  - Matt Rollings: piano
  - Dean Parks: electric guitar
  - Paul Franklin: steel guitar
  - Lyle Lovett: acoustic guitar, vocals
  - Stuart Duncan: fiddle
  - John Hagen: cello
5. "South Texas Girl"
  - Viktor Krauss: bass
  - Russ Kunkel: drums
  - Matt Rollings: piano
  - Dean Parks: electric guitar
  - Paul Franklin: steel guitar
  - Lyle Lovett: acoustic guitar, vocals
  - Stuart Duncan: fiddle
  - Sam Bush: mandolin
  - John Hagen: cello
  - Jon Randall: harmony vocals
  - Guy Clark: intro and outro acoustic guitar, intro vocals
  - James Gilmer, Steve Jones, Jeff White and Billy Williams: outro group vocals
6. "This Traveling Around"
  - Viktor Krauss: bass
  - Russ Kunkel: drums
  - Matt Rollings: piano
  - Dean Parks and Mitch Matkins: electric guitar
  - Paul Franklin: steel guitar
  - Lyle Lovett: acoustic guitar, vocals
  - Stuart Duncan: fiddle
  - Sam Bush: mandolin
  - John Hagen: cello
  - James Gilmer: percussion
  - Jon Randal: harmony vocals
7. "Up In Indiana"
  - Viktor Krauss: bass
  - Russ Kunkel: drums
  - Matt Rollings: piano
  - Dean Parks: electric guitar
  - Paul Franklin: steel guitar
  - Lyle Lovett: acoustic guitar, vocals
  - Stuart Duncan: fiddle
  - Sam Bush: mandolin
  - Jon Randal: harmony vocals
  - Jeff White: pre-production mandolin and harmony vocals
8. "The Alley Song"
  - Viktor Krauss: bass
  - Russ Kunkel: drums
  - Matt Rollings: piano
  - Dean Parks: electric guitar
  - Paul Franklin: steel guitar
  - Lyle Lovett: acoustic guitar, vocals
  - Stuart Duncan: fiddle
  - John Hagen: cello
9. "No Big Deal"
  - Viktor Krauss: bass
  - Russ Kunkel: drums
  - Matt Rollings: piano
  - Dean Parks: electric guitar
  - Paul Franklin: steel guitar
  - Lyle Lovett: acoustic guitar, vocals
  - Stuart Duncan: fiddle
10. "Make It Happy"
  - Viktor Krauss: bass
  - Russ Kunkel: drums
  - Matt Rollings: piano
  - Dean Parks: electric guitar
  - Paul Franklin: steel guitar
  - Lyle Lovett: acoustic guitar, vocals
  - Stuart Duncan: fiddle
  - Sam Bush: mandolin
  - Arnold McCuller, Sweet Pea Atkinson, Lamont Van Hook and Joseph Powell: harmony vocals
11. "Ain't No More Cane"
  - Viktor Krauss: bass
  - Matt Rollings: piano
  - Lyle Lovett: acoustic guitar, vocals
  - Stuart Duncan: fiddle
  - Sam Bush: mandolin
  - Jerry Douglas: dobro
  - Arnold McCuller, Jason Eskridge, Sweet Pea Atkinson, Harry Bowens, Francine Reed, Lamont Van Hook and Josef Powell: harmony vocals
12. "Up In Indiana" (acoustic)
  - Viktor Krauss: bass
  - Lyle Lovett: acoustic guitar, vocals
  - Stuart Duncan: fiddle
  - Sam Bush: mandolin
  - Jerry Douglas: dobro
  - Béla Fleck: banjo
  - Jeff White: pre-production mandolin and harmony vocals

== Chart performance ==
Chart performance for It's Not Big It's Large
Chart (2007)	Peak position
US Billboard 200	18
US Top Country Albums (Billboard)	2
