= My Baby Don't Tolerate =

Studio album by Lyle Lovett
- Released: September 30, 2003
- Genre: Country
- Length: 56:52
- Label: Lost Highway
- Producer: Billy Williams

Lyle Lovett chronology
Smile: Songs from the Movies (2003)	My Baby Don't Tolerate (2003)	It's Not Big It's Large (2007)

Professional ratings
Review scores
Source	Rating
Allmusic	link

My Baby Don't Tolerate is an album recorded by Lyle Lovett and released in 2003.

On Tolerate, Lovett favors his country side a bit more than his many other facets. While long-time fans were reportedly disappointed with the album's pop-flavored opening track "Cute as a Bug", many of the other songs demonstrated his strengths as a storyteller. Oddly, the album ends with two gospel songs with remarkably similar names, which some critics decried as an overly precious attempt at enforced quirkiness. Nonetheless, Tolerate garnered very positive responses and respectable sales figures.

== Track listing ==
All compositions by Lyle Lovett except as indicated

1. "Cute as a Bug" - 3:39
2. "My Baby Don't Tolerate" - 3:42
3. "The Truck Song" - 2:56
4. "In My Own Mind" - 5:36
5. "Nothing But a Good Ride" - 4:28
6. "Big Dog" - 3:37
7. "You Were Always There" (Lyle Lovett, Viktor Krauss) - 5:56
8. "Wallisville Road" - 5:06
9. "Working Too Hard" - 3:46
10. "San Antonio Girl" - 3:31
11. "On Saturday Night" - 3:23
12. "Election Day" (Blaze Foley) - 3:02
13. "I'm Going to Wait" - 4:41
14. "I'm Going to the Place" - 3:22

== Notes ==
Lovett was nominated for a Grammy Award in the category Best Male Country Vocal Performance for "My Baby Don't Tolerate" & "In My Own Mind".

My Baby Don't Tolerate is Lovett's first album of original material since 1996's The Road to Ensenada as well as his first album released through Lost Highway Records.

Two tracks, "The Truck Song" and "San Antonio Girl", were previously released on the 2001 collection Anthology, Vol. 1: Cowboy Man.

== Chart performance ==
Chart performance for My Baby Don't Tolerate
Chart (2003)	Peak position
US Billboard 200	63
US Top Country Albums (Billboard)	7
