= Margo Reed =

American jazz musician

Margo Reed (c. 1942 – April 15, 2015) was an American blues singer and the sister of blues singer Francine Reed.

In 2000, Margo Reed was named Female Vocalist of the Year by Arizona Jazz magazine. She was inducted into the Arizona Blues Hall of Fame in 2004 and received the Jazz in Arizona Lifetime Achievement Award in 2008.

Reed spent the majority of her career in Arizona, playing with numerous jazz greats including Judy Roberts, with whom she performed her final gig.
