= Natural Forces =

Studio album by Lyle Lovett
- Released: October 20, 2009
- Label: Lost Highway

Lyle Lovett chronology
It's Not Big It's Large (2007)	Natural Forces (2009)	Release Me (2012)

Professional ratings
Review scores
Source	Rating
AllMusic	link
Entertainment Weekly	B link
Minor 7th	(no rating) link

Natural Forces is an album by Lyle Lovett, released in 2009 (see 2009 in music). All twelve songs, including the five written or co-written by Lovett, are written by songwriters from Texas.

== Track listing ==
1. "Natural Forces" (Lyle Lovett) – 5:40
2. "Farmer Brown/Chicken Reel" (Lovett, Traditional) – 4:03
3. "Pantry" (Lovett, April Kimble) – 4:08
4. "Empty Blue Shoes" (Lovett) – 2:58
5. "Whooping Crane" (Eric Taylor) – 4:50
6. "Bayou Song" (Don Sanders) – 4:05
7. "Bohemia" (Tommy Elskes) – 3:18
8. "Don't You Think I Feel It Too" (David Ball) – 3:48
9. "Sun and Moon and Stars" (Vince Bell) – 4:33
10. "Loretta" (Townes Van Zandt) – 3:38
11. "It's Rock and Roll" (Lovett, Robert Earl Keen) – 4:30
12. "Pantry" [Acoustic Version] (Lovett, Kimble) – 4:03

== Chart performance ==
Chart performance for Natural Forces
Chart (2009)	Peak position
US Billboard 200	29
US Top Country Albums (Billboard)	8
