= Pontiac (album) =

Studio album by Lyle Lovett
- Released: January 1988
- Recorded: April 1987
- Studio: Sound Stage Studios, Nashville, TN
- Genre: Country; blues; jazz
- Length: 35:07
- Label: MCA/Curb
- Producer: Tony Brown; Lyle Lovett; Billy Williams

Lyle Lovett chronology
Lyle Lovett (1986)	Pontiac (1988)	Lyle Lovett and His Large Band (1989)

Pontiac is the second studio album by American singer Lyle Lovett, released in 1988.

== Critical reception ==
Professional ratings
Review scores
Source	Rating
AllMusic	5/5 stars
Robert Christgau	B−
Los Angeles Times	3.5/4 stars
Music Hound	4.5/5 stars
Pitchfork	9.0/10
Rolling Stone	4/5 stars
Spin Alternative Record Guide	10/10
Virgin	4/5 stars

Pontiac was ranked at 201 in the list of the "500 Best Albums of All-Time" by the German edition of Rolling Stone in 2004. The album was cited as one of the top 100 albums of the 1980s by the Italian magazines Il Mucchio Selvaggio and Velvet. It is also one of 300 albums listed in the book 50 Years of Great Recordings, and appeared at number 33 on the Village Voice's list of top albums of 1988. A 2023 review by Pitchfork's Nadine Smith described it as "a terrific showcase of his subversive and idiosyncratic country style", with its songwriting "land[ing] somewhere between magical realism and creative nonfiction".

== Chart performance ==
Pontiac reached number 12 on Billboard's chart for Top Country Albums, and 117 on the Billboard 200.

== Track listing ==
All songs written by Lyle Lovett

1. "If I Had a Boat" – 3:06
2. "Give Back My Heart" – 3:00
3. "I Loved You Yesterday" – 2:56
4. "Walk Through the Bottomland" – 4:11
5. "L.A. County" – 3:17
6. "She's No Lady" – 3:13
7. "M-O-N-E-Y" – 3:15
8. "Black and Blue" – 3:58
9. "Simple Song" – 3:17
10. "Pontiac" – 2:24
11. "She's Hot to Go" – 2:30

== Personnel ==
- Tony Brown – producer
- Paul Franklin – steel guitar
- Vince Gill – guitar, background vocals (track 2)
- John Hagen – cello
- Emmylou Harris – background vocals (track 4)
- Ray Herndon – electric guitar
- Simon Levy – art direction
- Lyle Lovett – acoustic guitar, vocals, producer
- Steve Marsh – saxophone
- Matt McKenzie – electric bass
- Glenn Meadows – mastering
- Edgar Meyer – double bass
- Peter Nash – photography
- Willie Pevear – engineer
- Francine Reed – background vocals (tracks 2, 7, and 11)
- Matt Rollings – piano, DX-7 synthesizer
- J. David Sloan – background vocals
- Harry Stinson – drums, background Vocals
- Steve Tillisch – engineer, mixing
- Ron Treat – engineer
- Billy Williams – acoustic and rhythm guitar, associate producer
- Marty Williams – second engineer

== Chart performance ==
Chart performance for Pontiac
Chart (1988)	Peak position
US Billboard 200	117
US Top Country Albums (Billboard)	12
