= Lyle Lovett and His Large Band =

Studio album by Lyle Lovett
- Released: January 25, 1989
- Genres: Country; blues; jazz; country swing
- Length: 40:55
- Label: MCA/Curb
- Producers: Billy Williams, Lyle Lovett, Tony Brown

Lyle Lovett chronology
Pontiac (1987)	Lyle Lovett and His Large Band (1989)	Joshua Judges Ruth (1992)

Singles from Lyle Lovett and His Large Band
- 1. "I Married Her Because She Looks Like You" Released: 1989; 2. "Stand by Your Man" Released: 1989; 3. "Nobody Knows Me" Released: 1989; 4. "Here I Am" Released: 1990

Professional ratings
Review scores
Source	Rating
AllMusic	4.5/5 stars
Robert Christgau	B
The Encyclopedia of Popular Music	3/5 stars
MusicHound Rock: The Essential Album Guide	3.5/5 stars
Rolling Stone	4/5 stars
The Rolling Stone Album Guide	3/5 stars
Spin Alternative Record Guide	8/10

Lyle Lovett and His Large Band is Lyle Lovett's third album, released in 1989. Lovett won the Grammy Award for Best Male Country Vocal Performance for the album.

Lovett's cover of Tammy Wynette's "Stand By Your Man" was later included in the soundtrack of the 1992 movie The Crying Game.

== Production ==
The album incorporated more of a big band-influenced sound than Lovett's previous albums.

== Chart performance ==
Lyle Lovett and His Large Band reached number 10 on Billboard's chart for Top Country Albums, and 62 on the Billboard Hot 200.

== Critical reception ==
Robert Christgau called the album "very humorous," writing that "after kicking off with a sharp r&b instrumental, the lapsed grad student dispenses with pretension and boils country down to the basics." Trouser Press wrote: "In rock’n’roll’s 40 disreputable years only Randy Newman has produced such adult music, or brought such irreproachable aesthetics to the task of charting moral sleight of hand." The New Yorker wrote that "Lovett reveals his weird splendor in a schizophrenic jumble of smoky jazz and twangy country that revives whole swaths of neglected popular American music."

== Track listing ==
All tracks composed by Lyle Lovett, except where indicated

1. "The Blues Walk (Instrumental)" (Clifford Brown) – 2:25
2. "Here I Am" – 4:01
3. "Cryin' Shame" – 2:28
4. "Good Intentions" – 3:13
5. "I Know You Know" – 3:57
6. "What Do You Do/The Glory of Love" (Billy Hill, Lovett) – 3:06
7. "I Married Her Just Because She Looks Like You" – 3:14
8. "Stand by Your Man" (Billy Sherrill, Tammy Wynette) – 2:44
9. "Which Way Does That Old Pony Run" – 4:08
10. "Nobody Knows Me" – 3:06
11. "If You Were to Wake Up" – 4:07
12. "Once Is Enough" – 4:26

== Personnel ==
- Lyle Lovett - vocals, guitar
- Richard Bennett – guitar
- Paul Franklin - steel guitar
- Ray Herndon - guitar
- Deschamps Hood - guitar, background vocals
- Billy Williams - guitar
- Matt Rollings - piano, Hammond organ
- Ben Stivers - piano
- Leland Sklar - bass
- Andy Laster - sax
- Steve Marsh - sax
- Paul Leim - drums
- John Hagen - cello
- Mark O'Connor - fiddle, mandola
- David Ball - background vocals
- Rodney Crowell - background vocals
- Walter Hyatt - background vocals
- Mac McAnally - background vocals
- Francine Reed - background vocals
- Harry Stinson - background vocals
- Russ Kunkel - drums
- Warren Hood - Fiddle/Violin

== Charts ==
=== Weekly charts ===
Chart (1989)	Peak position
Canadian Albums (RPM)	88
Dutch Albums (Album Top 100)	86
New Zealand Albums (RMNZ)	45
US Billboard 200	62
US Top Country Albums (Billboard)	10

=== Year-end charts ===
Chart (1989)	Position
US Top Country Albums (Billboard)	34
Chart (1990)	Position
US Top Country Albums (Billboard)	68
