= Cowboy Man =

Single by Lyle Lovett

Single by Lyle Lovett

from the album Lyle Lovett
- B-side: "Waltzing Fool"
- Released: October 1986
- Genre: Western swing
- Length: 2:48
- Label: Curb
- Songwriter(s): Lyle Lovett
- Producer(s): Tony Brown; Lyle Lovett

Lyle Lovett singles chronology
"Farther Down the Line" (1986)	"Cowboy Man" (1986)	"God Will" (1987)

"Cowboy Man" is a song written and recorded by American singer-songwriter Lyle Lovett. It was released in October 1986 as the second single from his album Lyle Lovett. The song peaked at number 10 on the Billboard Hot Country Singles chart.

== Content ==
The song is in the key of B-flat major, mainly following the chord pattern B♭-E♭-B♭-F7-B♭. Written by Lovett himself, it was one of four songs included on a demo tape that he submitted to ASCAP's Merlin Littlefield. Described by The Orlando Sentinel writer Thom Duffy as "a bit of Texas swing that features a shuffling beat and a fiddle crying like the horn of a passing freight train", the song is about the narrator's pursuit of a cowgirl whom he wants to marry.

== Chart performance ==
Chart (1986–1987)	Peak position
US Hot Country Songs (Billboard)	10
Canadian RPM Country Tracks	23
