= Release Me (Lyle Lovett album) =

Studio album by Lyle Lovett
- Released: February 28, 2012
- Length: 51:50
- Label: Lost Highway
- Producers: Nathaniel Kunkel, Lyle Lovett

Lyle Lovett chronology
Natural Forces (2009)	Release Me (2012)	12th of June (2022)

Release Me is the eleventh studio album by Lyle Lovett, released in 2012 through the record label Lost Highway Records.

== Track listing ==
1. "Garfield's Blackberry Blossom" – 3:06
2. "Release Me" (with k.d. lang) – 2:45
3. "White Boy Lost in the Blues" – 3:32
4. "Baby, It's Cold Outside" (with Kat Edmonson) – 3:17
5. "Isn't That So" – 4:50
6. "Understand You" – 3:43
7. "Brown Eyed Handsome Man" – 3:36
8. "Keep It Clean" – 2:36
9. "One Way Gal" – 2:59
10. "Dress of Laces" (with Sara Watkins) – 6:13
11. "The Girl with the Holiday Smile" – 3:57
12. "Night's Lullaby" (with Sara and Sean Watkins) – 3:25
13. "White Freightliner Blues" – 5:06
14. "Keep Us Steadfast" – 2:45

== Chart performance ==
Chart (2012)	Peak position
US Billboard Top Country Albums	9
US Billboard 200	60
