= Francine Reed =

American singer

- Born: July 11, 1947 (age 79); Pembroke Township, Illinois, U.S.
- Genres: Blues, jazz
- Website: Official website

Francine Reed (born July 11, 1947) is an American blues singer, solo artist, and regular singing partner of Lyle Lovett since the 1980s and member of Lovett's Large Band. Reed has also recorded duets with Willie Nelson and Delbert McClinton and others.

== Biography ==
Reed sang at church services in her youth and her music was inspired and influenced by her gospel-singing father. She is the sister of jazz singer Margo Reed who died in April 2015 at the age of 73.

In Phoenix, Arizona, Francine Reed appeared with Miles Davis, Stanley Jordan, Smokey Robinson, Etta James, and The Crusaders. In 1985, she began recording and touring with Lyle Lovett and His Large Band. Reed has also appeared on recordings by Delbert McClinton, Willie Nelson and Roy Orbison. After she relocated to Georgia in the 1990s, she released her first solo album, I Want You to Love Me. Reed has received the W. C. Handy Artist of the Year and Song of the Year nominations. (The W. C. Handy awards were renamed the Blues Music Awards in 2006). Reed was inducted into the Arizona Blues Hall of Fame in 1997.

Reed is perhaps best known for her performances of the classic blues song "Wild Women (Don't Get the Blues)", written in 1924 by Ida Cox. A recording of this song appears on Reed's albums, I Want You to Love Me, I Got a Right!...to Some of My Best, and Blues Collection; as well as on Ichiban Records Wild Women Do Get the Blues and Lyle Lovett's Live in Texas.

Reed's distinctive voice can be heard on a television advertisement for Senokot laxative ("I Feel Good"), and in a scene from the film The Firm (1993).

In the mid-1990s she moved to Atlanta, Georgia, where she frequently performed at Blind Willie's in the Virginia-Highland neighborhood. In 2016 she moved back to Phoenix and has given up touring.

== Partial discography ==
Artist	Title (format)	Label	Cat#	Country	Release date
Francine Reed	"Take Some Time For Love" / "Tear Down These Walls" (7")	Wild Sky Records	6019		1990
Francine Reed	I Want You To Love Me (CD, Album)	Ichiban International	D2-24851-2		1995
Francine Reed	Can't Make it On My Own (CD)	Ichiban International	D2-24886-2		1996
Francine Reed	Wild Women Do Get the Blues (Cassette, CD)	Ichiban Records	1190		1996
Francine Reed	"Been There, Done That" (7", Single)	Ichiban Records	97-437		1997
Francine Reed	Shades of Blue (CD, Comp)	Platinum Entertainment	15095-9595-2		1999
Francine Reed	Here Comes Frani Claus (CD, EP)	CMO Records	CMO11032		2000
Francine Reed	I Got a Right!...To Some of My Best (CD)	CMO Productions/Tree Sound Studio	CMO 1010		2001
Francine Reed	Francine Reed (CD, Album)	Ichiban Blues	ICH-01011		2002
Francine Reed	American Roots: Blues (CD)	Ichiban Records	1011		2002
Francine Reed	Surrender (CD)	Jez Graham/Stephen Kalinich			2011
Francine Reed	Francine Reed Live at Eddie's Attic (CD)	Francine Reed			2012
Francine Reed	Wild Hearted Woman (CD, MP3))	Fervor Records	FVRCD06214		2015
Francine Reed and Fever (28)	"Wild Women Don't Get the Blues" / "When The Eagle Flies" (7", Single)	The Old Bombay Bicycle Club	44570		Unknown
Francine Reed with Lyle Lovett	Lyle Lovett ( LP, Album, Club)	MCA Records	MCA-5748	US	1986
Francine Reed with Lyle Lovett	Lyle Lovett ( LP, Album)	Curb Records	CUR 7504-2	Germany, Australia, Switzerland	1986
Francine Reed with Lyle Lovett	Lyle Lovett ( CD, Album)	MCA Records, Curb Records	MCAD-5478	US	1986
Francine Reed with Lyle Lovett	Lyle Lovett ( CD, Album)	Curb Records	471794	Austria	1986
Francine Reed with Lyle Lovett	Lyle Lovett ( CD, Album, RE)	MCA Records, Curb Records	MCABD-31307	Canada	1986
Francine Reed with Lyle Lovett	Lyle Lovett ( Cass, Album)	MCA Records, Curb Records	MCFC-3361	UK	1986
Francine Reed with Lyle Lovett	Lyle Lovett ( Cass, Album, Dol)	MCA Records, Curb Records	MCAC-5748	US	1986
Francine Reed with Lyle Lovett	Lyle Lovett ( LP, Album)	MCA Records	MCF 3361	UK	1986
Francine Reed with Lyle Lovett	Lyle Lovett (LP, Album)	MCA Records, Curb Records	MCA-5748	Canada	1986
Francine Reed with Lyle Lovett	Lyle Lovett (LP, Album)	Vogue	540144	France	1986
Francine Reed with Lyle Lovett	Lyle Lovett (CD, Album)	Curb Records	471794 2	Australia	unknown
Francine Reed with Lyle Lovett	Lyle Lovett (LP, CD, Album)	Curb Records, MCA Records	DMCF 3361, MCA 5748	UK	1998
Francine Reed with Lyle Lovett	Lyle Lovett (CD, Album, RE)	MCA Records, Curb Records	MCAD-31307	US	unknown
Francine Reed with Lyle Lovett	Lyle Lovett (CD, Album, RE)	MCA Records, Curb Records	MCAD-31307, MCABD-31307	Canada	unknown
Francine Reed with Lyle Lovett	Lyle Lovett CD, Album, RE)	MCA Records	MCLD 19134	UK	unknown
Francine Reed with Lyle Lovett	Pontiac (LP, Album, CD, Club)	Curb Records	MCA-42028	US	1987
Francine Reed with Lyle Lovett	Pontiac (Vinyl, LP, Album)	Curb Records, Ariola	209 497	Germany	1988
Francine Reed with Lyle Lovett	Pontiac (LP, Album)	Curb Records	RPM 1246	South Africa	1987
Francine Reed with Lyle Lovett	Pontiac (CD, Album, Club)	Curb Records, MCA Records	MCAD-42028	US	1987
Francine Reed with Lyle Lovett	Pontiac (Cass, Album, RE, Dol)	Curb Records, MCA Records	MCAMC 42028, MCAMC-42028	Canada	unknown
Francine Reed with Lyle Lovett	Pontiac (CD, Album)	Curb Records	471795 2	Australia	1987
Francine Reed with Lyle Lovett	Pontiac (CD, Album)	Curb Records, RCA	ZD 71691	Germany	1987
Francine Reed with Lyle Lovett	Pontiac (CD, Album)	MCA Records, Curb Records	DMCF 3389	UK	1987
Francine Reed with Lyle Lovett	Pontiac (Cass, Album)	MCA Records	MCFC 3389	UK	1987
Francine Reed with Lyle Lovett	Pontiac (Cass, Album)	Curb Records, MCA Records	MCAC-42028	US	1987
Francine Reed with Lyle Lovett	Lyle Lovett and His Large Band (Vinyl, LP, Album)	MCA Records	MCG 6037		1989
Francine Reed with Lyle Lovett	Lyle Lovett and His Large Band (CD, Album, Club)	MCA Records, Curb Records	MCAD-42263	US	1989
Francine Reed with Lyle Lovett	Lyle Lovett and His Large Band (Cassette, Album, Dol)	MCA Records, Curb Records	MCAC-42263	Canada	1989
Francine Reed with Lyle Lovett	Lyle Lovett and His Large Band (CD, Album)	MCA Records, Curb Records	MCAWD-42263	Canada	1989
Francine Reed with Lyle Lovett	Lyle Lovett and His Large Band (Cassette, Album)	MCA Records, Curb Records	MCAC-42263	US	1989
Francine Reed with Lyle Lovett	Lyle Lovett and His Large Band (LP, Album, Club, Vinyl)	MCA Records, Curb Records	MCA-42263	US	1989
Francine Reed with Lyle Lovett	Lyle Lovett and His Large Band (Vinyl, LP, Album)	MCA Records, Curb Records	MCA-42263	Canada	1989
Francine Reed with Lyle Lovett	Lyle Lovett and His Large Band (LP, Album)	Curb Records	ZL-71998	Germany	1989
Francine Reed with Lyle Lovett	Lyle Lovett and His Large Band ( LP)	Sonet, Curb Records	SLP-3145, SLP-3145	Europe	1989
Francine Reed with Lyle Lovett	Lyle Lovett and His Large Band ( LP, Album)	RCA Victor, Curb Records	MCA 42263, VPL1 6808	Australia	1989
Francine Reed with Lyle Lovett	Lyle Lovett and His Large Band (Cass, Album)	MCA Records, Curb Records	MCGC-6037	UK	1989
Francine Reed with Lyle Lovett	Lyle Lovett and His Large Band (CD, Album)	Sonet, Curb Records	SLPCD-3145	Europe	1989
Francine Reed with Lyle Lovett	Lyle Lovett and His Large Band (LP, Album, Vinyl)	Curb Records	209 660	Germany	1989
Francine Reed with Lyle Lovett	Lyle Lovett and His Large Band (CD, Album)	Curb Records	ZD71998	Germany	1989
Francine Reed with Lyle Lovett	Lyle Lovett and His Large Band (CD, Album)	Curb Records	471796 2	Australia	1989
Francine Reed with Lyle Lovett	Lyle Lovett and His Large Band (Vinyl, LP, Album)	Curb Records	D1-79004	US	2015
Francine Reed with Lyle Lovett	Joshua Judges Ruth (Vinyl, LP, Album)	Curb Records	MCA-10475	US	1992
Francine Reed with Lyle Lovett	Joshua Judges Ruth (CD, Album)	Curb Records, Curb Records	471531 2, 01-471531-10	Australia	1992
Francine Reed with Lyle Lovett	Joshua Judges Ruth (CD, Album)	Curb Records	471531 2	Australia	1992
Francine Reed with Lyle Lovett	Joshua Judges Ruth (CD, Album)	Edel, Curb Records	CUR 7508-2	Germany, Australia, Switzerland	1992
Francine Reed with Lyle Lovett	Joshua Judges Ruth (CD, Album)	Curb Records, MCA Records	MCAD-10475	Canada	1992
Francine Reed with Lyle Lovett	Joshua Judges Ruth (CD, Album, Club)	MCA Records, Curb Records	MCAD-10475	US	1992
Francine Reed with Lyle Lovett	Joshua Judges Ruth (CD, Album)	MCA Records, Curb Records	MCAD-10475	UK	1992
Francine Reed with Lyle Lovett	Joshua Judges Ruth (CD, Album, Multichannel))	High Definition Surround, Curb Records, MCA Records	71021-54430-2-7	US	1992
Francine Reed with Lyle Lovett	Joshua Judges Ruth (CD, Album, Promo)	Curb Records	ALCB-565	Japan	1992
Francine Reed with Lyle Lovett	Joshua Judges Ruth (Cass, Album, Dol)	Curb Records, Mushroom	471531 4	Australia	1992
Francine Reed with Lyle Lovett	Joshua Judges Ruth (Cass, Album, Club, Dol)	MCA Records, Curb Records	MCAC-10475	US	1992
Francine Reed with Lyle Lovett	Joshua Judges Ruth ( LP, Album)	MCA Records, Curb Records	MCA-10475	UK	1992
Francine Reed with Lyle Lovett	Joshua Judges Ruth (CD, Album, RE)	Curb Records	D2-79001	US, Canada	2014
Francine Reed with Lyle Lovett	Joshua Judges Ruth (CD, Album, Club)	MCA Records, Curb Records	MCAD-10475	US	unknown
Francine Reed with Lyle Lovett	Live in Texas (CD, Album)	Curb Records	CURCD 078		1999
Francine Reed with Lyle Lovett	Live in Texas (CD, Album)	Curb Records	4 84640	Germany	1999
Francine Reed with Lyle Lovett	Live in Texas (CD, Album)	MCA Records	MCAD-11964	US	1999
Francine Reed with Lyle Lovett	Live in Texas (CD, Album)	MCA Records	MCAD-11964	UK	1999
Francine Reed with Lyle Lovett	Smile - Songs from The Movies (CD, Compilation)	Curb Records	MCA 088113 184 2	US, Canada	2003
Francine Reed with Lyle Lovett	It's Not Big It's Large (Deluxe Edition) (CD, Album, DVD-Video, Region)	Hump Head Records	HUMP 048	US	2007
Francine Reed with Lyle Lovett	It's Not Big It's Large (CD, Album)	Curb Records, Lost Highway	B0008966-02	US	2007
Francine Reed with Delbert McClinton	Never Been Rocked Enough (CD, Album)	Curb Records	D2-77521		1992
Francine Reed with Roy Orbison	King of Hearts (Cassette, Album)	Virgin Records	V4-86520		1992
Francine Reed with Willie Nelson	Milk Cow Blues (CD, Album)	Island Records	314 542 517-2		2000
Francine Reed with Willie Nelson	Songs (CD, Compilation)	Lost Highway, Hip-O Records, UTV Records	B0002300-02		2005

== TV and film ==
Artist name	Song title	Show title	Episode	Production	Program	Air date
Francine Reed	"You've Got to Change"	Ghost Wars	107	SyFy	TV	11-16-2017
Francine Reed	"You've Got to Change"	Almost Friends	--	Gravitas Ventures/Orion Pictures	Film	11-17-2017
Francine Reed	"You've Got to Change"	Graves	106	EPIX	TV	11-20-2017
Francine Reed	"Good Lovin' Woman"	Chicago Fire	414	NBC	TV	2-9-2016
Francine Reed	"It Won't Be Me"	The Disaster Artist	--	New Line Cinema	Film	3-12-2017
