= Step Inside This House =

Studio album by Lyle Lovett
- Released: September 22, 1998
- Genre: Country
- Length: 80:10
- Label: MCA
- Producer: Lyle Lovett & Billy Williams

Lyle Lovett chronology
The Road to Ensenada (1996)	Step Inside This House (1998)	Live in Texas (1999)

For the Mel B song, see Hot (Mel B album).

Professional ratings
Review scores
Source	Rating
Allmusic	3/5 stars

Step Inside This House is the seventh album by Lyle Lovett, released in 1998. In contrast with his earlier albums, populated mostly by songs penned by Lovett, House is a double-length album of cover songs written by fellow Texans.

In choosing songs to record, Lovett favored songwriters whose works influenced his own style instead of immensely popular artists whose name recognition might boost sales. The writers selected include Robert Earl Keen, Michael Martin Murphey, Willis Alan Ramsey, Eric Taylor, and Guy Clark. The second disc is largely dedicated to songs written by Steven Fromholz, Townes Van Zandt and Walter Hyatt, with the final track being a traditional piece.

The title track was written by Guy Clark but does not appear on any of his albums. After learning the song from Clark, Lovett fell in love with it, and Clark gave him permission to include it on this album.

== Track listing ==
=== Disc one ===
1. "Bears" (Steven Fromholz) – 3:04
2. "Lungs" (Townes Van Zandt) – 2:18
3. "Step Inside This House (Step Inside My House)" (Guy Clark) – 5:29
4. "Memphis Midnight/Memphis Morning" (Eric Taylor) – 4:23
5. "I've Had Enough" (Vince Bell, Craig Calvert) – 3:02
6. "Teach Me About Love" (Walter Hyatt) – 3:52
7. "Sleepwalking" (Willis Alan Ramsey) – 5:39
8. "Ballad of the Snow Leopard and the Tanqueray Cowboy" (David Rodriguez) – 5:51
9. "More Pretty Girls Than One" (traditional) – 2:56
10. "West Texas Highway" (Boomer Castleman, Michael Martin Murphey) – 3:32
11. "Rollin' By" (Robert Earl Keen) – 4:06

=== Disc two ===
1. "Texas Trilogy: Daybreak" (Fromholz) – 3:17
2. "Texas Trilogy: Train Ride" (Fromholz) – 2:35
3. "Texas Trilogy: Bosque County Romance" (Fromholz) – 4:53
4. "Flyin' Shoes" (Van Zandt) – 4:38
5. "Babes in the Woods" (Hyatt) – 3:04
6. "Highway Kind" (Van Zandt) – 3:27
7. "Lonely in Love" (Hyatt) – 2:45
8. "If I Needed You" (Van Zandt) – 3:46
9. "I'll Come Knockin' " (Hyatt) – 3:24
10. "Texas River Song" (traditional) – 4:09

== Personnel ==
- Lyle Lovett – vocals, acoustic guitar
- Sam Bush – mandolin
- Russ Kunkel – drums
- Luis Conte – percussion
- Jerry Douglas – dobro, Weissenborn
- Stuart Duncan – fiddle
- Paul Franklin – pedal steel guitar
- Dean Parks – electric guitar
- Don Potter – acoustic guitar
- John Hagen – cello
- Deschamps Hood – harmony vocals
- Alison Krauss – harmony vocals
- David Ball – harmony vocals
- Viktor Krauss – bass
- Leland Sklar – bass
- Matt Rollings – piano

== Production notes ==
- Produced by Lyle Lovett and Billy Williams
- Robert Hadley – mastering
- Ron Lewter – mastering
- Doug Sax – mastering
- Nathaniel Kunkel – engineer
- John Nelson – assistant engineer
- James Gilmer – production assistant
- Vance Knowles – production assistant
- Kathi Whitley – production coordination
- Jonas Livingston – art direction
- Tim Stedman – design
- Keith Tamashiro – design
- Michael Wilson – photography

== Chart performance ==
=== Weekly charts ===
Chart (1998)	Peak position
US Billboard 200	55
US Top Country Albums (Billboard)	9

=== Year-end charts ===
Chart (1998)	Position
US Top Country Albums (Billboard)	72
