= That's Right (You're Not from Texas) =

Single by Lyle Lovett

from the album The Road to Ensenada
- Released: February 24, 1997
- Recorded: 1996
- Genre: Country, western swing
- Length: 4:54
- Label: Curb/MCA
- Songwriters: Lyle Lovett, Willis Alan Ramsey, Alison Rogers
- Producer: Lyle Lovett

Lyle Lovett singles chronology
"It Ought to Be Easier" (1996)	"That's Right (You're Not from Texas)" (1997)	"Bears" (1998)

"That's Right (You're Not from Texas)" is a song written by Lyle Lovett, Willis Alan Ramsey and Alison Rogers and recorded by Lovett for his 1996 studio album The Road to Ensenada. It was released as the album's fourth single on February 24, 1997.

Due to its use in a series of advertisements promoting Texas tourism, the phrase has also come to be used independently to describe the quirky and sometimes misunderstood attitudes associated with Texas.

== Lyrics ==
That's Right is a lighthearted song that lightly mocks the popularity of cowboy fashions in urban settings, and reflects the general sense of Texan pride that newcomers and outsiders often misunderstand.

The second verse is a tribute to the members of Uncle Walt's Band, a band actually from South Carolina who later became associated with the Austin, Texas country music scene.

Those boys from Carolina
They sure enough could sing
But when they came on down to Texas
We all showed them how to swing

Now David's on the radio
And old Champ's still on the guitar
And Uncle Walt he's home with Heidi
Hiding in her loving arms

Lovett was a huge fan of Uncle Walt's band as a college student, and Lovett had gone on to produce Hyatt's 1990 album King Tears. Walter Hyatt died a month before the release of this album.

== Other media ==
In 1999, the Texas tourism board ran an ad campaign featuring Lyle Lovett singing the refrain "That's Right, You're Not from Texas, but Texas wants you anyway."

Possibly because of the national exposure of the ad campaign, the phrase has been used independently, even in non-musical contexts as a general expression conveying Texans' sometimes baffling customs. Roger Ebert titled a compilation of responses to his review of the movie Friday Night Lights "That's right you're not from Texas", in which most of the writers rebuked Ebert for misunderstanding the devout Texan football culture. Garrison Keillor used the same title for a tribute to Molly Ivins, explaining that she exemplified and celebrated a distinct Texan attitude that many others didn't understand.

== Reviews ==
AllMusic's review of The Road to Ensenada praises several songs on the album as being "funny without being silly".
