= Joshua Judges Ruth =

Studio album by Lyle Lovett
- Released: March 31, 1992
- Genre: Country; Blues; Gospel; Jazz; Swing
- Length: 57:15
- Label: Curb/MCA
- Producer: Billy Williams, George Massenburg, Lyle Lovett

Lyle Lovett chronology
Lyle Lovett and His Large Band (1989)	Joshua Judges Ruth (1992)	I Love Everybody (1994)

Professional ratings
Review scores
Source	Rating
AllMusic	3.5/5 stars
Chicago Tribune	3/4 stars
Entertainment Weekly	B+
Rolling Stone	4/5 stars
Spin Alternative Record Guide	9/10

Joshua Judges Ruth is Lyle Lovett's fourth album, released in 1992.

While the album does not have one theme that binds all the songs, several tracks deal with "high concepts" such as religion ("Church") and death ("Family Reserve" & "Since The Last Time").The album's title is a pun made up of the names of three books that appear sequentially in the Old Testament: Joshua, Judges, and Ruth.

In keeping with Lovett's other releases, Joshua received critical acclaim but failed to vault the singer into mainstream success. First single "You've Been So Good Up To Now" was a minor hit on rock radio, peaking at #36 on the Billboard Mainstream Rock Tracks chart.

== Track listing ==
All songs by Lyle Lovett, except "North Dakota" by Lyle Lovett and Willis Alan Ramsey.

1. "I've Been To Memphis" - 4:56
2. "Church" - 6:01
3. "She's Already Made Up Her Mind" - 4:48
4. "North Dakota" - 5:42
5. "You've Been So Good Up To Now" - 4:15
6. "All My Love Is Gone" - 4:23
7. "Since The Last Time" - 7:11
8. "Baltimore" - 4:53
9. "Family Reserve" - 3:59
10. "She's Leaving Me Because She Really Wants To" - 4:07
11. "Flyswatter/Ice Water Blues (Monte Trenckmann's Blues)" - 3:44
12. "She Makes Me Feel Good" - 3:34

== Personnel ==
- Lyle Lovett – vocals, guitar
- Ray Herndon – guitar
- Leo Kottke – guitar
- Jay Dee Maness – guitar, pedal steel guitar
- Dean Parks – guitar, slide guitar, background vocals
- Johnny Lee Schell – electric guitar
- Billy Williams – guitar, trombone
- Dan Higgins – alto saxophone
- Plas Johnson – tenor saxophone
- Greg Smith – baritone saxophone
- Larry Williams – tenor saxophone
- Matt Rollings – piano, Hammond organ
- Russ Kunkel – drums
- Kevin Dorsey – bass, background vocals
- Edgar Meyer – bass
- Leland Sklar – bass
- John Hagen – cello
- Sweet Pea Atkinson – background vocals
- Sir Harry Bowens – background vocals
- Emmylou Harris – background vocals, harmony vocals (track 10)
- Kathy Hazzard – background vocals
- Rickie Lee Jones – background vocals, harmony vocals (track 4)
- Arnold McCuller – background vocals
- Willis Alan Ramsey – background vocals, harmony vocals
- Francine Reed – background vocals (tracks 2, 7, & 9)

== Production notes ==
- Produced by Lyle Lovett, George Massenburg and Billy Williams
- Ivy Skoff – production coordination
- George Massenburg – engineer, mixing
- Nathaniel Kunkel – engineer
- Gil Morales – engineer
- Noel Hazel – engineer
- Marnie Riley – engineer
- Steve Holroyd – engineer
- Ron Lewter – mastering
- Alan Yoshida – mastering
- Doug Sax – mastering
- Peter Nash – photography
- Michael Wilson – photography
- Tim Stedman – art direction, design
- Jonas Livingston – art direction

== Chart performance ==
Chart (1992)	Peak position
Canadian RPM Top Albums	49
New Zealand Albums Chart	23
US Billboard 200	57
