= Dr. T & the Women =

Dr. T & The Women
- Theatrical release poster
- Directed by: Robert Altman
- Written by: Anne Rapp
- Produced by: Robert Altman; James McLindon
- Starring: Richard Gere; Helen Hunt; Farrah Fawcett; Laura Dern; Shelley Long; Tara Reid; Kate Hudson; Liv Tyler
- Cinematography: Jan Kiesser
- Edited by: Geraldine Peroni
- Music by: Lyle Lovett
- Production companies: Initial Entertainment Group; Sandcastle 5
- Distributed by: Artisan Entertainment (United States); Splendid Film; 20th Century Fox (Germany); Initial Entertainment Group (Overseas)
- Release date: October 13, 2000
- Running time: 122 minutes
- Countries: United States; Germany
- Languages: English; German; Spanish
- Budget: $23 million
- Box office: $22.8 million

Dr. T & The Women is a 2000 American romantic comedy film directed by Robert Altman, featuring an ensemble cast including Richard Gere as wealthy gynecologist Dr. Sullivan Travis ("Dr. T") and Helen Hunt, Farrah Fawcett, Laura Dern, Shelley Long, Tara Reid, Kate Hudson, and Liv Tyler as the various women that he encounters in his everyday life. The movie was primarily filmed in Dallas, Texas, and was released in US theaters on October 13, 2000. The film's music was composed by American composer and alternative country singer Lyle Lovett, who released an album of his score in September 2000.

== Plot ==
Dr. Sullivan 'Sully' Travis (aka "Dr. T."), a wealthy Dallas gynecologist for some of the wealthiest ladies in Texas, finds his life beginning to fall apart starting when his wife, Kate, suffers from "Hestia Complex", a rare type of stigmatization syndrome of wealthy women; after she disrobes in a shopping mall fountain while shopping for their daughter's wedding registry at Tiffany's, she is committed to the state mental hospital. When Dr. T visits Kate, she rebuffs his kisses as improper and he sees her old psyche cannot be returned to now by his affection. Dr. T's daughter, Dee Dee, a student at Southern Methodist University and alternate for the Dallas Cowboys Cheerleaders, is planning to go through with her approaching wedding despite the secret that she is romantically involved with Marilyn, her former college friend in Houston and the maid of honor. Dr. T's other daughter, Connie, is a conspiracy theorist and eventually reveals to her father that Dee Dee and Marilyn are lovers.

While Marilyn is on his examining table for the first time, she surmises her condition is caused by the stress of being the maid of honor for her friend Dee Dee. Dr. T realizes she is Dee Dee's lover and becomes embarrassed mid-examination, asking the nurse to finish.

Dr. T's loyal secretary Carolyn has romantic feelings for him, which are not mutual: in a farcical scene at the workday end, she locks the office door and gives him a shoulder massage from behind his chair, secretly disrobing while emphasizing his need for a loving wife. Refreshed but unaware of her intentions, he goes to the coat closet, turns, and finds she has vanished. From under the desk, she says he never empties his trash baskets. Approaching the desk he glimpses her state of undress and quickly leaves.

Meanwhile, Dr. T's alcoholic sister-in-law, Peggy, unintentionally meddles in every situation she stumbles into. She is currently divorced and has moved into his house with her three daughters.

At his golf club, Bree, a golf pro, gets accidentally soaked by the automatic sprinklers. He offers a towel and his dry golf cart and they decide to play the round together. Accepting his offer for dinner, she says she knows a better place than his suggested restaurant, next they're taking grocery bags into her condo. She moves quickly and gracefully turning on the stereo music by Lyle Lovett, the grill on the balcony, putting steak on, going upstairs, into one room, then walking nude across the balcony to the shower. After dinner, she takes a bottle of wine upstairs, briefly hesitating he follows her and they become lovers. She provides friendship and comfort in his difficult office and personal life.

As Dee Dee's wedding begins the skies are darkening and thunder increasing. As the procession is blown by increasing wind, Dee Dee bypasses her groom, embraces and kisses Marilyn and the skies open up sending all the guests for shelter. Inspired, Dr. T drives his open-top convertible to Bree's house where he asks her to marry and run away with him. He offers to fulfill her every need and she asks why she would want that (this is what caused Kate's syndrome according to her psychologist). She says she has made other plans. Dr. T. asks if she is with Harlan, one of his golfing/hunting buddies, and she replies: “I’m not with anybody.” Distraught, Dr. T. drives off into the storm and into a tornado as it crosses his path and is lifted into the air, tumbling in debris. The scene fades to the morning after. The camera view pans to reveal distant mountains surrounding a vast desert flat land. His car is found by three Mexican girls. A little girl in a white dress with a veil sees the doctor's badge on the front grille of the car. They find and lead him, still dazed, to a circle of seven tiny houses where a girl is in labor. Galvanized by the sight, he immediately washes his hands, drops his wedding ring into the basin, takes charge, and delivers the baby, holding it and rejoicing “It’s a boy!”

== Cast ==
- Richard Gere as Dr. Sullivan Travis / Dr. T
- Helen Hunt as Bree Davis
- Farrah Fawcett as Kate Travis
- Laura Dern as Peggy
- Shelley Long as Carolyn
- Tara Reid as Connie Travis
- Kate Hudson as Dee Dee Travis
- Liv Tyler as Marilyn
- Robert Hays as Harlan
- Matt Malloy as Bill
- Andy Richter as Eli
- Lee Grant as Dr. Harper
- Janine Turner as Dorothy Chambliss
- Sarah Shahi as Cheerleader (uncredited)

== Release ==
Dr. T & The Women was released in US cinemas on October 13, 2000, by Artisan Entertainment, and earned $5,012,867 in its opening weekend on 1,489 screens, ranking #7 in the weekend of October 13, 2000 ultimately grossing $13,113,041 in the United States. It was released in the United Kingdom on July 6, 2001, by Columbia TriStar Film Distributors International, grossing $9,731,250 in international profits.

== Reception ==
The film received mixed reviews from critics. On review aggregation website Rotten Tomatoes, the film has a 57% approval rating, based on 108 reviews with an average rating of 5.71/10. The site's consensus states: "In terms of quality, Dr. T & the Women is one of Altman's good-but-not-great films. In typical Altman style, it features some great ensemble acting, including a wonderful performance by Richard Gere." Metacritic gave the film an average score of 64/100, based on 35 reviews, indicating "generally favourable reviews". CinemaScore audience polling gave the film an "F". It was released the same day as Lost Souls, which also received an "F".

Critic Roger Ebert gave the film three stars, stating "When you hear that Dr. T is a gynecologist played by Richard Gere, you assume he is a love machine mowing down his patients. Nothing could be further from the truth."

A. O. Scott wrote in a review for The New York Times, "'Dr. T and the Women' uses its affluent milieu to good comic effect, but it's mellower and more forgiving than [Altman's earlier works The Player, Tanner '88, and Nashville], and less interested in social criticism than in the celebration of human foible. In spite of Sully's troubles, the emotional stakes never seem very high. Everyone seems to be having too much fun to be suffering terribly much."

In a moderately favorable review for Variety, Todd McCarthy wrote, "Although marked by a continually enjoyable accretion of detail and vital work by the thesps, storytelling admittedly leans to the slight and leisurely through the first hour or so, until a prolonged sequence devoted to Dr. T’s day from hell."
