= Ray Herndon =

- Born: July 14, 1960 (age 65)
- Origin: Phoenix, Arizona, U.S.
- Genres: Country
- Occupation(s): Singer/songwriter, musician
- Instrument(s): Vocals, guitar,
- Years active: 1964–present
- Labels: Dualtone Records; MCA Records; Compendia Records
- Member of: McBride & the Ride
- Formerly of: Lyle Lovett's Large Band; J. David Sloan and the Rogues
- Website: www.thebash.com/country/the-herndon-brothers

Ray Herndon (born July 14, 1960) is an American country singer/songwriter and guitarist known mainly for playing with Lyle Lovett's Large Band and McBride & the Ride.

== Early life and education ==
Ray Herndon grew up in an Arizona musical family. His father, Brick Herndon, also from a musical family, was a musician, band leader and owner of a Scottsdale, Arizona, club, Handlebar J, that played country music. Herndon's older two brothers were also musicians. By age three he appeared with them on local television, singing, dancing and playing instruments. At age four he recorded two Christmas songs in Los Angeles for RCA and at seven was playing guitar in his father's band. He studied jazz at Mesa Community College; one of the guitar workshops there was led by Joe Pass. He continued playing at Handlebar J through his years at school. Shortly after finishing at Mesa Community College he left the family business against his mother's wishes, joining a Phoenix houseband, J. David Sloan and the Rogues. The Rogues were a cover band of country hits with swing and jazz influences.

== Career ==
The Rogues were invited to play at the 1983 Schueberfouer funfair in Luxembourg. He met Lyle Lovett there and invited him to sit in with the band; they learned a few of his songs and backed him up during their sets. The swing and harmony that Lovett found with the Rogues opened his eyes to what his songs could sound like with proper backing. Sloan offered Lovett a deal on studio time, first day free. In 1984 Lovett took him up on the offer. After several stays in Arizona over that summer he recorded 18 songs, backed up by the Rogue musicians. The demo tape of those songs led to his first record deal. Thus began Herndon's relationship with Lovett; he's played with him since 1983, became lead guitarist in 1985, played on many of his recordings, sang a duet with him on his first album and toured with him, off and on, from 1986. Looking to "expand [his] horizons," in 1989, he became a founding member of the country group McBride & the Ride; they had early success with four consecutive top-five singles. He has had three stints with McBride & the Ride, 1989–1994, 2000–2002 and when they reconstituted in 2021. The 1994 split was caused by their label, which was looking for mass appeal with a different style, and renamed the band after he left. After the 2002 split, he released a solo album, Livin’ the Dream (with musical guests, including Lyle Lovett, Jessi Colter, Jon Randall Stewart, Sonya Isaacs and Clint Black). Herndon called the 2021 iteration "almost Zen-like." In February, 2022, the band had their first Nashville concert in 20 years.

During his Nashville years, he was an active songwriter. His major successes included co-writing Kenny Chesney's breakout Me and You and his own My Dog Thinks I'm Elvis, which was used in a television commercial for Radio Shack. Besides Chesney, he has written songs for Aaron Tippin, Lee Greenwood, Linda Davis, Sonya Isaacs and McBride & the Ride.

=== Return to Arizona ===
After his time as a Nashville songwriter, he returned to Arizona to help his family run the Handlebar J, where he and his brother Ron have done weekly shows. In 2004 he and Jessi Colter hosted a show at the restaurant as a tribute to Waylon Jennings. It was called Outlaw Connection, carried by SIRIUS and introduced by Steven Van Zandt. Other participants included Hank Williams Jr., Shooter Jennings, Tony Furtado, and Tony Joe White. In 2008, he was inducted into the Arizona Music and Entertainment Hall of Fame. In 2015 Herndon returned to the recording studio. Former Arizona Attorney General Grant Woods, to showcase Arizona in a different light, "rounded up a cast of Phoenix-area all-stars" and cut an album called Grant Woods' The Project. Herndon sang What Else Could I Do. After his mother died in 2017 he bought out his brothers and became the sole owner of the restaurant, which has been family owned since 1975. He has remained active in the local Arizona music scene with mentoring young artists and 2022 performances with Matt Rollings and a tribute to Jerry Riopelle. On Herndon's decision to leave Nashville and return to Arizona, Lyle Lovett commented:

Someone as immensely talented as Ray Herndon chooses to live where he's from, to run his family's business and uphold his family's legacy. That's where life is for Ray. And I just admire that greatly.
