= Lyle Lovett (album) =

Studio album by Lyle Lovett
- Released: 1986
- Recorded: Chaton Recordings, Scottsdale, Arizona
- Genre: Country
- Length: 32:30
- Label: MCA/Curb
- Producers: Tony Brown, Lyle Lovett

Lyle Lovett chronology
Lyle Lovett (1986)	Pontiac (1987)

Singles from Lyle Lovett
- 1. "Farther Down the Line" Released: September 1986; 2. "Cowboy Man" Released: October 1986; 3. "God Will" Released: 1986; 4. "Why I Don't Know" Released: 1986

Professional ratings
Review scores
Source	Rating
Allmusic	5/5 stars
MusicHound Rock	4/5 bones
Robert Christgau	B+
Rolling Stone	3.5/5 stars
Spin Alternative Record Guide	7/10
The Virgin Encyclopedia of Popular Music	4/5 stars

Lyle Lovett is the 1986 debut album by American singer Lyle Lovett. By the mid-1980s, Lovett had already distinguished himself in the burgeoning Texas singer-songwriter scene. He had performed in the New Folk competition at the Kerrville Folk Festival in 1980 and returned to win in 1982. In 1984, he recorded a four-song demo with the help of the Phoenix band J. David Sloan and the Rogues and his music had begun to be distributed by the Fast Folk Musical Magazine.

Nanci Griffith had recorded Lovett's "If I Were the Man You Wanted" as "If I Were the Woman You Wanted" for her 1984 album, Once in a Very Blue Moon. He appears on that album as a vocalist and can also be seen in the picture on the cover of her subsequent album Last of the True Believers (1986).

== Critical reception ==
Lyle Lovett was ranked No. 91 in Rolling Stone's 100 Best Albums of the 1980s, and both Velvet and the Italian magazine Il Mucchio Selvaggio also listed it as one of the top 100 albums of the decade. Allmusic compares the album to Steve Earle's Guitar Town, calling it, "one of the most promising and exciting debut albums to come out of Nashville in the 1980s." Robert Christgau described Lovett's debut as: "Writes like Guy Clark, only plainer, sings like Jesse Winchester only countrier."

== Track listing ==
All songs by Lyle Lovett, except "This Old Porch" by Lyle Lovett and Robert Earl Keen.

1. "Cowboy Man" – 2:48
2. "God Will" – 2:13
3. "Farther Down the Line" – 3:05
4. "This Old Porch" – 4:16
5. "Why I Don't Know" – 2:41
6. "If I Were the Man You Wanted" – 3:57
7. "You Can't Resist It" – 3:08
8. "The Waltzing Fool" – 3:49
9. "An Acceptable Level of Ecstasy (The Wedding Song)" – 3:30
10. "Closing Time" – 3:43

== Personnel ==
=== Musicians ===
- Lyle Lovett – vocals, acoustic guitar; background vocals ("You Can't Resist It")
- Ray Herndon – electric rhythm guitar, background vocals; electric lead guitar ("Farther Down the Line" and "Why I Don't Know")
- Tom Mortensen – steel guitar
- Billy Williams – electric lead guitar; saxophone arrangements
- Vince Gill – electric rhythm guitar ("You Can't Resist It")
- Jon Goin – electric rhythm and lead guitars ("You Can't Resist It")
- Mac McAnally – acoustic lead guitar ("God Will", "Farther Down the Line" and "If I Were the Man You Wanted")
- Mathew McKenzie – bass
- Emory Gordy Jr. – bass ("Farther Down the Line")
- Mark Prentice – organ; piano ("God Will" and "Farther Down the Line")
- Matt Rollings – acoustic and electric piano
- John Jarvis – synthesizer ("You Can't Resist It")
- Jeff Borree – drums
- Bob Warren – drums ("Farther Down the Line", "This Old Porch" and "An Acceptable Level of Ecstasy")
- James Gilmer – congas
- Glen Duncan – fiddle
- Steve Marsh – saxophones
- J. David Sloan – background vocals
- Rosanne Cash – background vocals ("You Can't Resist It")
- Francine Reed – background vocals ("An Acceptable Level of Ecstasy")

=== Production ===
- Producers – Tony Brown and Lyle Lovett
- Associate Producer – Billy Williams
- Recorded at Chaton Recordings, Scottsdale, Arizona
  - Engineer – Steven Moore
  - Second Engineer – Andy Seagle
- Overdubs and Remix at Treasure Isle Recorders, Nashville, Tennessee
  - Remixed – Gene Eichelberger
  - Second Engineers – Tom Der and Tom Harding
- Mastered at Mastertonics using the JVC Audio Digital Mastering System
  - Mastering – Glen Meadows
- Digital editing – Milan Bogdan
- Compact Disc master tap prepared by Glen Meadows and Milan Bogdan

=== Artwork ===
- Simon Levy – art direction
- Peter Nash – photography
- Mickey Braithwaite – design
- Kate Gillon & Sherri Halford – CD coordination
- Guy Clark – liner notes

== Charts ==
Chart performance for Lyle Lovett
Chart (1986)	Peak position
US Top Country Albums (Billboard)	14
