= The Road to Ensenada =

Studio album by Lyle Lovett
- Released: June 18, 1996
- Genres: Western swing; country rock; folk
- Label: Curb/MCA
- Producers: Lyle Lovett & Billy Williams

Lyle Lovett chronology
I Love Everybody (1994)	The Road to Ensenada (1996)	Step Inside This House (1998)

Professional ratings
Review scores
Source	Rating
Allmusic	4.5/5 stars
Entertainment Weekly	A
FolkFire	Favorable
George Graham	Favorable
Music Box	4/5 stars
Rolling Stone	3/5 stars

The Road to Ensenada is the sixth album by Lyle Lovett, released in 1996.

At the Grammy Awards of 1997, The Road to Ensenada won the Grammy Award for Best Country Album.

== Track listing ==
All songs composed by Lyle Lovett except as noted.

1. "Don't Touch My Hat" – 3:47
2. "Her First Mistake" – 6:28
3. "Fiona" – 4:09
4. "That's Right (You're Not from Texas)" (Lovett, Willis Alan Ramsey, Alison Rogers) – 4:54
5. "Who Loves You Better" – 4:46
6. "Private Conversation" – 4:32
7. "Promises" – 3:07
8. "It Ought to Be Easier" – 4:11
9. "I Can't Love You Anymore" – 3:14
10. "Long Tall Texan" (Henry Strzelecki) – 3:27
11. "Christmas Morning" – 3:43
12. "The Road to Ensenada" – 4:16
13. "The Girl in the Corner"—hidden at the end of track 12, following 1:30 of silence

== Personnel ==
- Greg Adams – trumpet
- Sweet Pea Atkinson – baritone vocal
- Sir Harry Bowens – baritone vocal
- Jackson Browne – harmony vocals
- Valerie Carter – background vocals, harmony vocals
- Shawn Colvin – harmony vocals
- Luis Conte – percussion, tambourine, shaker
- Stuart Duncan – fiddle
- Chuck Findley – trombone, trumpet
- Paul Franklin – pedal steel guitar
- Willie Green Jr. – bass vocal
- Gary Herbig – alto saxophone, baritone saxophone, tenor saxophone
- Chris Hillman – harmony vocals
- Russ Kunkel – drums, shaker
- Lyle Lovett – acoustic guitar, rhythm guitar, vocals
- Kate Markowitz – background vocals, harmony vocals
- Arnold McCuller – background vocals, tenor vocals, harmony vocals
- Randy Newman – duet vocal on "Long Tall Texan"
- Dean Parks – acoustic guitar, electric guitar
- Herb Pedersen – harmony vocals
- Don Potter – acoustic guitar, Spanish guitar
- Matt Rollings – piano
- Leland Sklar – bass

== Chart performance ==
Chart (1996)	Peak position
U.S. Billboard Top Country Albums	4
U.S. Billboard 200	24
Canadian RPM Top Albums	23
UK Albums Chart	62
