= Lyle Lovett =

American country singer (born 1957)

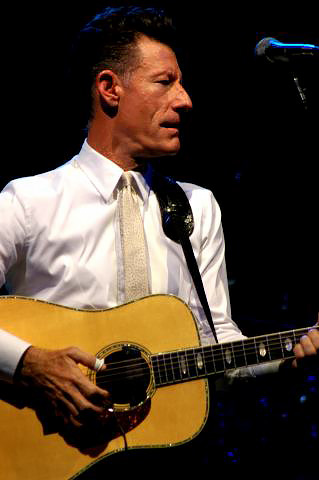
- Lovett performing in 2005

Background information
- Born: Lyle Pearce Lovett; November 1, 1957 (age 69); Houston, Texas, U.S.
- Origin: Klein, Texas, U.S.
- Genres: Alternative country; Americana; rockabilly; blues; jazz; swing
- Occupations: Singer; songwriter; actor
- Instruments: Vocals; guitar; piano
- Works: Lyle Lovett discography
- Years active: 1980–present
- Labels: MCA; Curb; Lost Highway; Verve
- Spouses: Julia Roberts (m. 1993; div. 1995); April Kimble (m. 2017)
- Children: 2
- Website: lylelovett.com

Lyle Pearce Lovett (born November 1, 1957) is an American country singer-songwriter and actor. Active since 1980, he has recorded 14 albums and released 25 singles including the number 10 hit on the U.S. Billboard Hot Country Songs chart, "Cowboy Man". Lovett has won four Grammy Awards including Best Male Country Vocal Performance and Best Country Album. His most recent album is 12th of June, released in 2022.

== Early life ==
Lovett was born in Houston and grew up in the nearby community of Klein, Texas. He is the son of William Pearce and Bernell Louise (née Klein) Lovett, a marketing executive and training specialist, respectively. Lyle grew up in the Lutheran Church–Missouri Synod. He graduated from Texas A&M University with Bachelor of Arts degrees in German and journalism in 1980. In the early 1980s, he often played solo acoustic sets at the small bars just off the A&M campus.

== Career ==
Lovett began his music career as a singer-songwriter. By the early 1980s, Lovett distinguished himself in the burgeoning Texas folk acoustic scene. He performed in the New Folk competition at the Kerrville Folk Festival in 1980 and 1982. An American singer, Buffalo Wayne, whom he met in 1978 during a college trip to Germany, invited Lovett to play with him at the 1983 Schueberfouer funfair in Luxembourg. The owner of the fair was a fan of the Phoenix house band J. David Sloan and the Rogues. He invited the Rogues to perform the event and Lovett was encouraged by band members Ray Herndon and Matt Rollings to sit in with the group. They performed some of Lovett's songs and Lovett later said it opened his eyes to what his songs could sound like with proper backing. At the time, he had never sung with a band.

In 1984, Lovett recorded 18 songs after Sloan and band member Billy Williams offered him deal on studio time, first day free. The demo tape of the first four songs led to his first record deal and ten of the songs recorded with the Rogues became Lovett's self-titled debut album. Some of the Rogues players including Herndon, Matt McKenzie, Rollings, and Williams played in Lovett's band. Williams produced or co-produced several of his albums from 1987 to 2007. Through the Rogues he met Francine Reed, who began recording with him in 1985 and toured with him for decades. In 2022, reliving his Phoenix connection, Lovett said,

It led to a demo tape, an album and now, this rolling Thanksgiving tour... It's all because of running into this band in Luxembourg. That's a long way to get to Phoenix from Texas. It's a lot shorter if you just do I-10.

Lovett signed with MCA Records in 1986 and released his eponymous debut album. He sang harmony vocals on Nanci Griffith's The Last of the True Believers album (1986). While typically associated with the country genre, Lovett's compositions often incorporate folk, swing, blues, jazz and gospel music as well as more traditional country & western styling. He has won four Grammy Awards, including Best Country Album (1996 for The Road to Ensenada), Best Country Duo/Group with Vocal (1994 for "Blues For Dixie" with the Texas swing group Asleep at the Wheel), Best Pop Vocal Collaboration (1994 for "Funny How Time Slips Away" with Al Green) and Best Country Male Vocal (1989 for Lyle Lovett and His Large Band). In 1995, Lovett performed a duet of "You've Got a Friend in Me" with Randy Newman for Toy Story. He plays Collings acoustic guitars.

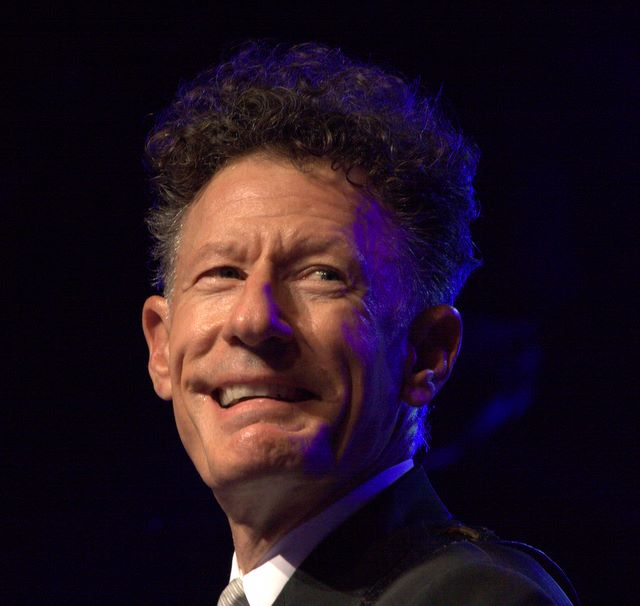
Lyle Lovett performing on the Watson Stage at MerleFest in Wilkesboro, North Carolina, April 2011

Lovett acted in a number of films, notably four for director Robert Altman: The Player (1992), Short Cuts (1993), Prêt-à-Porter (1994), and Cookie's Fortune (1999). He also composed the score for the director's Dr. T & the Women (2000). Some of his other film roles include Bastard Out Of Carolina (1996), The New Guy (2002), Walk Hard: The Dewey Cox Story (2007), and a humorous role in Angels Sing, a family Christmas film (alongside fellow actors and musicians such as Harry Connick, Jr., Connie Britton, Willie Nelson, and Kris Kristofferson). His television acting forays include guest roles on Mad About You and Castle, a recurring role on The Bridge (as Flagman, a lawyer), and appearances as himself on Dharma & Greg and Brothers & Sisters.

Mary Chapin Carpenter's 1992 song "I Feel Lucky" makes reference to Lovett, as does Bloodhound Gang's 1999 song "The Bad Touch", which includes the lyric, "and you'll Lovett just like Lyle."

Lovett was given an award called an "Esky" for Surest Thing in Esquire's 2006 Esky Music Awards in the April issue. The magazine said of Lovett: "The secret of Lyle Lovett's endurance comes down to the three C's: class, charisma and consistency... In the studio and on stage with his giant orchestra, he's spent two decades gracefully matching genuine songcraft with A-list musicianship". In 2010, Lovett appeared on an episode of Spectacle: Elvis Costello with... that also featured John Prine and Ray LaMontagne. In 2011, Lovett was named Texas State Artist Musician by the Texas Commission on the Arts. Lovett contributed a cover of Buddy Holly's "Well... All Right" for the tribute album Listen to Me: Buddy Holly (2011).

In 2019, Lovett was inducted into the Austin City Limits Hall of Fame. In 2022, he released his first album since 2012, 12th of June. Lyle Lovett is featured in "Foreword: A Conversation with the Indigo Girls, Kathy Mattea, and Lyle Lovett" in Brian T. Atkinson's Love at the Five and Dime: The Songwriting Legacy of Nanci Griffith.

== Personal life ==
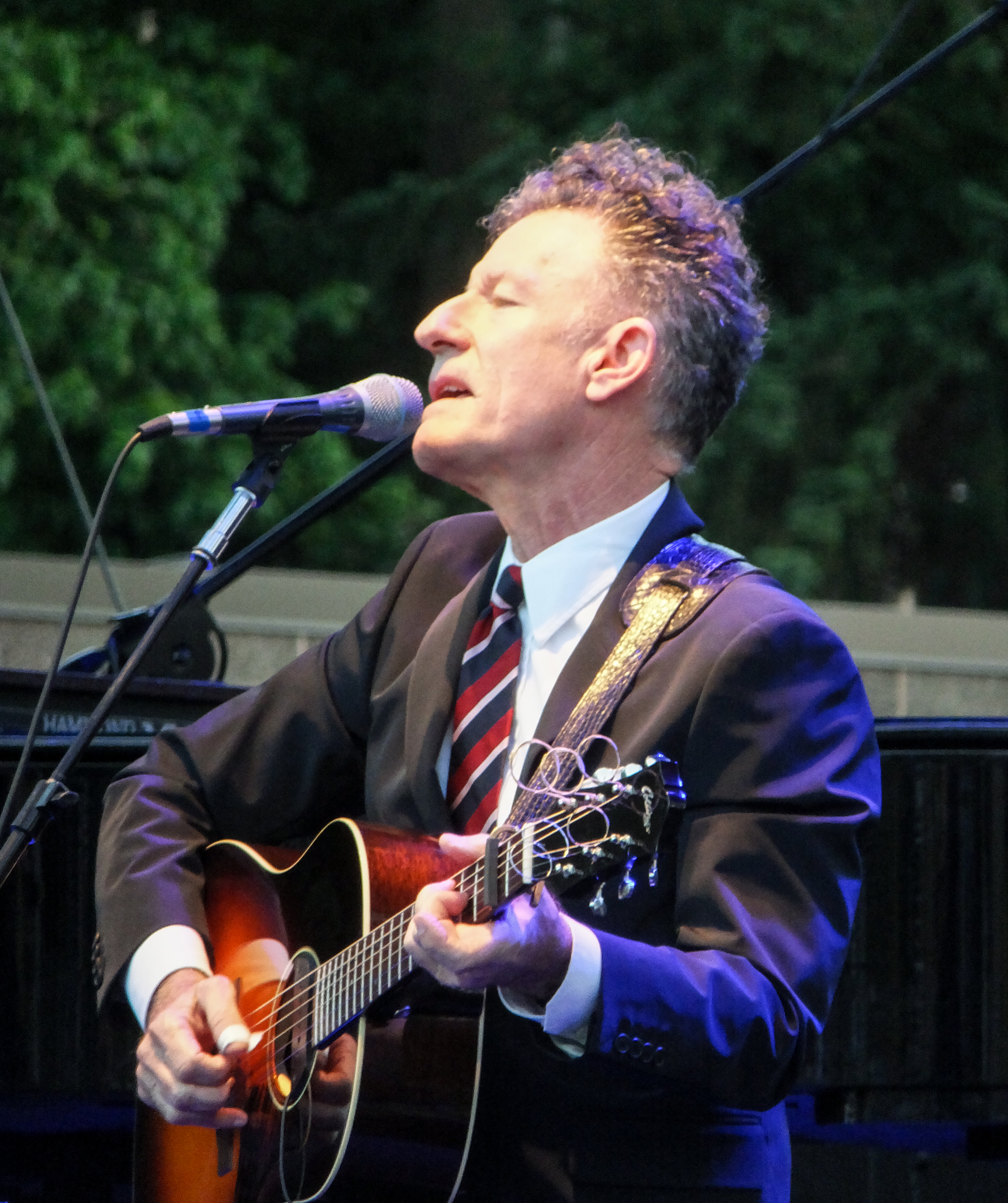
Lovett performing at the Oregon Zoo in Portland, July 2016

Lovett married actress Julia Roberts after being introduced by mutual friends. Following a three-week romance, they eloped and married in June 1993 in Marion, Indiana. In March 1995, they divorced after less than two years of marriage. Career demands were cited as the reason for the breakup, and they remained friends.

Lovett became engaged to film and music producer April Kimble in 2003; they married in 2017. The couple's twin son and daughter were born June 12, 2017. Lovett chose the date for the title of his 2022 album 12th of June. On the album, the song “Her Loving Man” is an ode to his wife. The family's home is an East Texas farm, homesteaded by Lovett's great-great-grandfather in the early 1850s.

On March 28, 2002, Lovett was trapped by a bull against a fence on his uncle's farm in Klein, Texas, before being pulled to safety. He fully recovered after six months from a badly broken leg, and he began touring again in summer 2003.

Lovett was given an honorary Doctor of Humane Letters by the University of Houston on May 15, 2010, at its general commencement ceremony. His mother was in the audience as her son was presented with an honorary doctorate from the same university from which she had received her bachelor's degree in 1960. His father was also a graduate of the Gerald D. Hines College of Architecture of the University of Houston. In 2015, Lovett received the Distinguished Alumnus Award from Texas A&M University.

Lyle Lovett is a horse enthusiast and co-owns and competes in reining competitions with his world class Quarter Horse named Smart And Shiney. In 2012, Lovett was inducted into the Texas Cowboy Hall of Fame. In 2018, he was awarded the National Reining Horse Association Lifetime Achievement Award in the National Reining Horse Association Hall of Fame.

== Discography ==
- Lyle Lovett (1986)
- Pontiac (1987)
- Lyle Lovett and His Large Band (1989)
- Joshua Judges Ruth (1992)
- I Love Everybody (1994)
- The Road to Ensenada (1996)
- Step Inside This House (1998)
- My Baby Don't Tolerate (2003)
- It's Not Big It's Large (2007)
- Natural Forces (2009)
- Release Me (2012)
- 12th of June (2022)

== Filmography ==
=== Musician ===
- Still Alice (2014) — song performer "If I Had A Boat"; songwriter for Karen Elson's performance of same
- The Bridge (TV series, 2014)
- True Blood (TV series, episode "I Will Rise Up", 2009) — song performer "I Will Rise Up"
- Walk Hard (2007) — song performer "Walk Hard"
- Deadwood (TV series, episode "Bullock Returns to the Camp", 2005) — song performer "Old Friend" (1994)
- The Exonerated (TV movie, 2005) — song performer "Amazing Grace"
- The Interpreter (2005) — song performer "If I Had a Boat"
- 61* (TV movie, 2001) — song performer "Nobody Knows Me"
- All Over the Guy (2001) — song performer and composer "She Makes Me Feel Good" and "The Blues Walk"
- Dr. T & the Women (2000) — song performer and composer and also used a recording of "You've Been So Good Up to Now" (1992), "She's Already Made Up Her Mind" (1992), "Ain't It Something" (1994)
- For Love of the Game (1999) — song performer "Summer Wind"
- Stuart Little (1999) — song performer "Walking Tall"
- Mumford (1999) — song performer "Ballad of the Snow Leopard and The Tanqueray Cowboy", "Till It Shines"
- Clay Pigeons (1998) — song performer "Teach Me About Love"
- Hope Floats (1998) — song performer "Smile"
- The Apostle (1997) — song performer "(I'm a) Soldier in the Army of the Lord"
- 2 Days in the Valley (1996) — song performer "Nobody Knows Me"
- Toy Story (1995) — song performer "You've Got a Friend in Me" with Randy Newman as the lead vocals.
- Beverly Hills, 90210 (TV series, episode "One Wedding and A Funeral", 1995) — song performer "Nobody Knows Me"
- Quiz Show (1994) — song performer "Moritat" by Kurt Weill
- With Honors (1994) — song performer "Blue Skies"
- Major League II (1994) — song performer and composer "All My Love Is Gone"
- The Firm (1993) — song performer "M-O-N-E-Y"
- Leap of Faith (1992) — song performer "Pass Me Not"
- The Crying Game (1992) — song performer "Stand By Your Man"
- Major League (1989) — song performer "Cryin' Shame"
- Always (1989) — song performer "Cowboy Man"

=== Actor ===
Year	Title	Role	Notes
1983	Bill: On His Own	Singer at Beach	(TV movie)
1992	The Player	Detective DeLongpre	
1993	Short Cuts	Andy Bitkower	
1994	Prêt-à-Porter	Clint Lammeraux	
1995	Mad About You	Lenny	(TV series, episode "Mad About You: Part 2")
1996	Bastard Out of Carolina	Wade	
1997	Breast Men	Research Scientist	(TV movie)
1998	Fear and Loathing in Las Vegas	Road Person	
1998	The Opposite of Sex	Sheriff Carl Tippett	
1999	Cookie's Fortune	Manny Hood	
1999	Penn & Teller's Sin City Spectacular	Himself	(episode 1.23)
1999	Mad About You	Lenny	(episode "The Final Frontier" Part 1)
2000	Dharma and Greg	Himself	(episode "The Trouble With Troubadours")
2002	Three Days of Rain	Disc Jockey	
2002	The New Guy	Bear Harrison	
2007	Brothers and Sisters	Himself	(episode "Something New")
2007	Walk Hard: The Dewey Cox Story	Himself	
2008	The Open Road	Peabody Bartender	
2010	Castle	Agent Westfield	(episode "Close Encounters of the Murderous Kind")
2013	Angels Sing	Griffin	
2013–2014	The Bridge	Monte P. Flagman	(10 episodes)
2017	Life in Pieces	Ned Gawler	(TV series, episode "Facebook Fish Planner Backstage")
2020–2023	Blue Bloods	Texas Ranger Waylon Gates	(3 episodes)
2022–2023	Big Sky	Tex	(TV series, 3 episodes)

== Theatre ==
=== Actor ===
- Much Ado About Nothing (The Shakespeare Center of Los Angeles, 2010) – Balthazar

=== Composer ===
- Much Ado About Nothing (The Shakespeare Center of Los Angeles, 2010)

== Honors ==
Year	Honor	Reference
2012	Inducted into the Texas Cowboy Hall of Fame	

=== Grammy Awards ===
The Grammy Awards are awarded annually by the National Academy of Recording Arts and Sciences. Lovett has won four awards from 17 nominations.

Year	Nominee / work	Award	Result
1989	"She's No Lady"	Best Country Song	Nominated
1989	Pontiac	Best Male Country Vocal Performance	Nominated
1990	Lyle Lovett and His Large Band	Best Male Country Vocal Performance	Won
1993	Joshua Judges Ruth	Best Male Pop Vocal Performance	Nominated
1993	"Church"	Best Music Video	Nominated
1995	I Love Everybody	Best Pop Album	Nominated
1995	"Funny How Time Slips Away" (with Al Green)	Best Pop Collaboration	Won
1995	"Blues for Dixie" (with Asleep at the Wheel)	Best Country Performance by a Duo or Group with Vocal	Won
1997	"Private Conversation"	Best Male Country Vocal Performance	Nominated
1997	"Long Tall Texan" (with Randy Newman)	Best Country Collaboration with Vocals	Nominated
1997	The Road to Ensenada	Best Country Album	Won
1999	Step Inside This House	Best Contemporary Folk Album	Nominated
2000	"That's Right (You're Not from Texas)"	Best Male Country Vocal Performance	Nominated
2002	"San Antonio Girl"	Best Male Country Vocal Performance	Nominated
2004	"My Baby Don't Tolerate"	Best Male Country Vocal Performance	Nominated
2004	My Baby Don't Tolerate	Best Country Album	Nominated
2005	"In My Own Mind"	Best Male Country Vocal Performance	Nominated

== Sources ==
- Oermann, Robert K. (1998). "Lyle Lovett". In The Encyclopedia of Country Music. Paul Kingsbury, Editor. New York: Oxford University Press. p. 307.
- Pullen, Doug (August 1, 2008). "Through fame, fortune and marriage to Julia Roberts, Texan Lyle Lovett has stayed true to his roots". El Paso Times.

Awards
First None recognized before	AMA Americana Trailblazer Award; 2007	Succeeded by Nanci Griffith
