= Dean Parks =

American guitarist and record producer (born 1946)

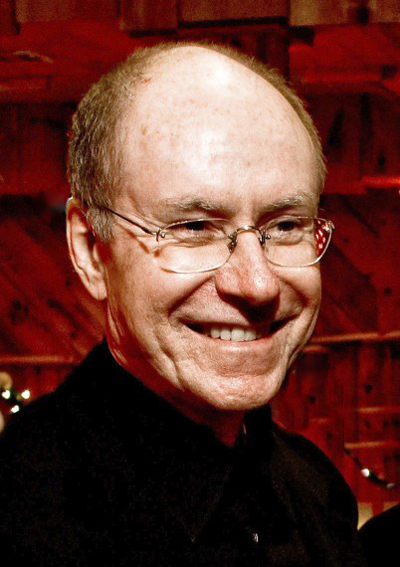
- Parks in 2008

Background information
- Born: Weldon Dean Parks; December 6, 1946 (age 79); Fort Worth, Texas, U.S.
- Genres: Pop; rock; jazz
- Occupation: Musician
- Instruments: Guitar; pedal steel
- Years active: 1970–present
- Website: deanparks.com

Weldon Dean Parks (born December 6, 1946) is an American session guitarist and record producer from Fort Worth, Texas. Parks has one Grammy nomination.

== Albums ==
Parks was member of the North Texas State One O'clock Lab Band before moving to Los Angeles to work with Sonny and Cher in 1970. In 1980, he was a founding member of the Christian Jazz Fusion band Koinonia. Parks is best known for his many contributions to albums by Steely Dan, Michael Jackson, and Bread. Notably, he played guitar on Steely Dan's Royal Scam track "Haitian Divorce". Parks is also a long-time collaborator on David Foster albums, such as Shadows by Gordon Lightfoot.

Parks features on Cat Beach's albums Letting Go and Love Me Out Loud. In 2008, Parks participated in the production of the album Psalngs, the debut release of Canadian musician John Lefebvre.

Parks is very prominently featured on Viktor Krauss' album II (2007), where he plays a plethora of other stringed instruments in addition to electric and acoustic guitars. He played on eight Lyle Lovett albums.

== Tours ==
During the late 1970s, Parks teamed up with Bread for their "Lost Without Your Love" reunion tour, taking on the responsibilities of lead guitarist. Following the departure of founding member Jimmy Griffin, Parks then became the 'unofficial' fourth member for the duration of the 1977/78 tours, including the visit to England to record a BBC TV special.

He continued the role when Bread's co-founder, David Gates, put together his own solo touring band shortly afterwards. In the spring of 2005 he joined David Crosby and Graham Nash on their European tour, as well as their U.S. tours in fall 2007, fall 2008, and spring 2011. In April 2017 Parks joined James Taylor's band while Taylor recovered from a broken finger.

== Movies ==
Parks has played guitar for film scores such as Care Bears Movie II: A New Generation (with Carol Parks), Bowfinger, My Big Fat Greek Wedding, The Big Bounce, Days of Thunder, Dying Young, August Rush, Dreamer: Inspired by a True Story and Rosewood (with Tommy Morgan and John Williams).

== Personal life ==
He was married to fellow musician Carol Parks.

== Discography ==
With America

- 1980 Alibi
- 1982 View from the Ground
- 1984 Perspective

With Bobby Bland

- 1969 Spotlighting the Man
- 1973 His California Album
- 1974 Dreamer

With Cher/Sonny & Cher

- 1973 Sonny & Cher Live, Sonny & Cher
- 1973 Bittersweet White Light, Cher
- 1973 Mama Was a Rock and Roll Singer, Papa Used to Write All Her Songs, Sonny & Cher

With Chris Botti

- 1999 Slowing Down the World
- 2003 A Thousand Kisses Deep
- 2004 When I Fall in Love
- 2005 To Love Again: The Duets
- 2007 Italia

With Michael Bublé

- 2003 Michael Bublé
- 2005 It's Time
- 2007 Call Me Irresponsible
- 2009 Crazy Love
- 2011 Christmas
- 2018 Love

With T Bone Burnett

- 1972 The B-52 Band & the Fabulous Skylarks
- 1992 The Criminal Under My Own Hat

With Joe Cocker

- 1984 Civilized Man
- 1996 Organic
- 1997 Across from Midnight
- 2004 Heart & Soul

With Koinonia (band)

- 1983 More Than a Feelin'
- 1989 Koinonia

With Andraé Crouch

- 1975 Take Me Back
- 1979 I'll Be Thinking of You
- 1981 Don't Give Up

With Rita Coolidge

- 1974 Fall into Spring
- 1975 It's Only Love
- 1977 Anytime…Anywhere
- 1979 Satisfied
- 1981 Heartbreak Radio
- 1996 Out of the Blues

With The Crusaders

- 1976 Free as the Wind
- 1978 Images
- 1980 Rhapsody and Blues
- 1980 Standing Tall
- 1984 Ghetto Blaster
- 1986 The Good and the Bad Times
- 2003 Rural Renewal

With Julia Fordham

- 1991 Swept
- 2002 Concrete Love
- 2004 That's Life
- 2005 That's Live

With Kenny Loggins

- 1977 Celebrate Me Home
- 1991 Leap of Faith
- 1994 Return to Pooh Corner
- 1997 The Unimaginable Life
- 2000 More Songs from Pooh Corner

With Lyle Lovett

- 1992 Joshua Judges Ruth
- 1996 The Road to Ensenada
- 1998 Step Inside This House
- 2003 My Baby Don't Tolerate
- 2003 Smile
- 2007 It's Not Big It's Large
- 2009 Natural Forces
- 2012 Release Me

With The Manhattan Transfer

- 1979 Extensions
- 1981 Mecca for Moderns
- 1995 Tonin'

With Aaron Neville

- 1991 Warm Your Heart
- 1993 The Grand Tour
- 1993 Aaron Neville's Soulfoul Christmas
- 1995 The Tattooed Heart
- 1997 ...To Make Me Who I Am
- 2000 Devotion
- 2003 Believe
- 2005 Gospel Roots

With Madeleine Peyroux

- 2004 Careless Love
- 2006 Half the Perfect World
- 2009 Bare Bones
- 2013 The Blue Room

With Rebecca Pidgeon

- 2005 Tough on Crime
- 2008 Behind the Velvet Curtain: Songs from the Motion Picture Redbelt
- 2012 Slingshot

With Joe Sample

- 1978 Rainbow Seeker
- 1979 Carmel
- 1980 Voices in the Rain
- 1982 The Hunter
- 1983 Roles
- 1985 Oasis
- 1995 Old Places Old Faces
- 1997 Sample This
- 2002 The Pecan Tree

With Steely Dan

- 1974 Pretzel Logic
- 1975 Katy Lied
- 1976 The Royal Scam
- 1977 Aja
- 2000 Two Against Nature

With Stevie Wonder

- 1973 Innervisions
- 1976 Songs in the Key of Life

With others

- 1971 Helen Reddy, Helen Reddy
- 1972 L.A. Reggae, Johnny Rivers
- 1973 Let's Get It On, Marvin Gaye
- 1973 Lulu, Lulu
- 1973 Piano Man, Billy Joel
- 1973 Blue Suede Shoes, Johnny Rivers
- 1973 Eddie Kendricks, Eddie Kendricks
- 1973 Angel Clare, Art Garfunkel
- 1974 Martha Reeves, Martha Reeves
- 1974 Boogie Down!, Eddie Kendricks
- 1974 Reunion: The Songs of Jimmy Webb, Glen Campbell
- 1974 Wrap Around Joy, Carole King
- 1975 Sedaka's Back, Neil Sedaka
- 1975 New Lovers and Old Friends, Johnny Rivers
- 1975 Nigel Olsson, Nigel Olsson
- 1975 Diamonds & Rust, Joan Baez
- 1975 Rhinestone Cowboy, Glen Campbell
- 1975 Adventures in Paradise, Minnie Riperton
- 1975 Kim Carnes, Kim Carnes
- 1975 I've Got the Music in Me, Thelma Houston
- 1976 Photograph, Melanie
- 1976 Streetheart, Dion DiMucci
- 1976 Wild Night, Johnny Rivers
- 1976 Music, Music, Helen Reddy
- 1976 Bloodline, Glen Campbell
- 1976 Steppin' Out, Neil Sedaka
- 1976 Everything Must Change, Randy Crawford
- 1976 Endless Flight, Leo Sayer
- 1976 Gulf Winds, Joan Baez
- 1976 Dee Dee Bridgewater, Dee Dee Bridgewater
- 1976 The Painter, Paul Anka
- 1977 Here You Come Again, Dolly Parton
- 1977 El Mirage, Jimmy Webb
- 1977 Outside Help, Johnny Rivers
- 1977 Blowin' Away, Joan Baez
- 1978 Heartbreaker, Dolly Parton
- 1978 Leo Sayer, Leo Sayer
- 1978 Night Flight, Yvonne Elliman
- 1978 This Night Won't Last Forever, Bill LaBounty
- 1978 Midnight Believer, B.B. King
- 1979 Open Your Eyes, Maria Muldaur
- 1979 Wet, Barbra Streisand
- 1979 Hard Times for Lovers, Judy Collins
- 1979 Take It Home, B.B. King
- 1980 Inherit the Wind, Wilton Felder
- 1980 This Time, Al Jarreau
- 1980 Now We May Begin, Randy Crawford
- 1980 Red Cab to Manhattan, Stephen Bishop
- 1980 Somethin' 'Bout You Baby I Like, Glen Campbell
- 1980 In the Pocket, Neil Sedaka
- 1981 Power of Love, Arlo Guthrie
- 1981 Secret Combination, Randy Crawford
- 1981 I'll Be There, Gail Davies
- 1981 Pirates, Rickie Lee Jones
- 1981 If I Should Love Again, Barry Manilow
- 1981 The Right Place, Gary Wright
- 1981 Restless Eyes, Janis Ian
- 1981 Songs of the Beatles, Sarah Vaughan
- 1981 Scissors Cut, Art Garfunkel
- 1981 Love Life, Brenda Russell
- 1981 Breakin Away, Al Jarreau
- 1982 Windsong, Randy Crawford
- 1982 Friends in Love, Dionne Warwick
- 1982 Heartlight, Neil Diamond
- 1982 Daylight Again, Crosby, Stills & Nash
- 1982 If That's What It Takes, Michael McDonald
- 1982 Hey Ricky, Melissa Manchester
- 1982 Givin' Herself Away, Gail Davies
- 1982 Angel Heart, Jimmy Webb
- 1982 Bill LaBounty, Bill LaBounty
- 1982 Shadows, Gordon Lightfoot
- 1982 The Nightfly, Donald Fagen
- 1982 Thriller, Michael Jackson
- 1983 Hearts and Bones, Paul Simon
- 1983 Hello Big Man, Carly Simon
- 1983 Salute, Gordon Lightfoot
- 1983 What a Feelin', Irene Cara
- 1983 Seventh Wave, Melanie
- 1983 Not a Through Street, Johnny Rivers
- 1983 Girl at Her Volcano, Rickie Lee Jones
- 1983 Surrender, Debby Boone
- 1983 The Wild Heart, Stevie Nicks
- 1983 Emergency, Melissa Manchester
- 1983 A Christmas Album, Amy Grant
- 1983 Two Eyes, Brenda Russell
- 1983 Trouble in Paradise, Randy Newman
- 1984 Straight Ahead, Amy Grant
- 1984 The Magazine, Rickie Lee Jones
- 1985 Stay Tuned, Chet Atkins
- 1985 Dreamland Express, John Denver
- 1985 Crazy from the Heat, David Lee Roth
- 1985 Without Your Love, Dionne Warwick
- 1985 Real Love, Dolly Parton
- 1985 Nobody Wants to Be Alone, Crystal Gayle
- 1985 Dangerous, Natalie Cole
- 1986 One World, John Denver
- 1986 Rapture, Anita Baker
- 1986 Street Language, Rodney Crowell
- 1986 Nine Lives, Bonnie Raitt
- 1986 The Bridge, Billy Joel
- 1987 I Prefer the Moonlight, Kenny Rogers
- 1987 Famous Blue Raincoat, Jennifer Warnes
- 1987 Maria Vidal, Maria Vidal
- 1988 Brian Wilson, Brian Wilson
- 1988 The Best Years of Our Lives, Neil Diamond
- 1988 Nothing but the Truth, Ruben Blades
- 1988 Land of Dreams, Randy Newman
- 1988 Twice the Love, George Benson
- 1988 Nobody's Angel, Crystal Gayle
- 1989 On Solid Ground, Larry Carlton
- 1989 Something Inside So Strong, Kenny Rogers
- 1989 Somebody Loves You, Paul Anka
- 1989 Let it Go, Clair Marlo
- 1989 Ain't Gonna Cry, Juice Newton
- 1989 Good to Be Back, Natalie Cole
- 1989 Barry Manilow, Barry Manilow
- 1989 No Holdin' Back, Randy Travis
- 1989 Home for Christmas, Debby Boone
- 1989 Here I Am... Yes, It's Me, Nikka Costa
- 1989 Vonda Shepard, Vonda Shepard
- 1989 Bowling in Paris, Stephen Bishop
- 1989 Flying Cowboys, Rickie Lee Jones
- 1989 Cry Like a Rainstorm, Howl Like the Wind, Aaron Neville, Linda Ronstadt
- 1989 O Tempo e o Vento, Roberto Carlos
- 1990 Some People's Lives, Bette Midler
- 1990 Heroes & Friends, Randy Travis
- 1990 Beth Nielsen Chapman, Beth Nielsen Chapman
- 1990 Ivory, Teena Marie
- 1990 If There Was a Way, Dwight Yoakam
- 1990 Blue Pacific, Michael Franks
- 1990 Kiss Me with the Wind, Brenda Russell
- 1991 What You See Is What You Sweat, Aretha Franklin
- 1991 Pure Schuur, Diane Schuur
- 1991 Dance of Love, Dan Hill
- 1991 Showstoppers, Barry Manilow
- 1991 Christmas, Stephanie Mills
- 1991 The Fire Inside, Bob Seger
- 1991 Can You Stop the Rain, Peabo Bryson
- 1991 All I Can Be, Collin Raye
- 1991 Keep This Love Alive, Tom Scott
- 1992 The Future, Leonard Cohen
- 1992 King of Hearts, Roy Orbison
- 1992 Timeless: The Classics, Michael Bolton
- 1992 The Christmas Album, Neil Diamond
- 1992 In the Running, Howard Jones
- 1992 Something Real, Stephanie Mills
- 1993 Suspending Disbelief, Jimmy Webb
- 1993 Back to Broadway, Barbra Streisand
- 1993 This Time, Dwight Yoakam
- 1993 Let There Be Peace on Earth, Vince Gill
- 1993 The Crossing, Paul Young
- 1993 Up on the Roof: Songs from the Brill Building, Neil Diamond
- 1993 I'll Always Be There, Roch Voisine
- 1993 Friends Can Be Lovers, Dionne Warwick
- 1993 Thousand Roads, David Crosby
- 1993 Traffic from Paradise, Rickie Lee Jones
- 1993 The Colour of My Love, Céline Dion
- 1993 I'm Alive, Jackson Browne
- 1993 Duets, Elton John
- 1993 Blink of an Eye, Michael McDonald
- 1994 11 Tracks of Whack, Walter Becker
- 1994 Rhythm of Love, Anita Baker
- 1994 Passion Play, Teena Marie
- 1994 Jamie Walters, Jamie Walters
- 1995 Bette of Roses, Bette Midler
- 1995 Gone, Dwight Yoakam
- 1995 That's Me in the Bar, A. J. Croce
- 1995 Time Was, Curtis Stigers
- 1995 Delilah Blue, Joshua Kadison
- 1995 Kissing Rain, Roch Voisine
- 1995 Feels Like Home, Linda Ronstadt
- 1995 Cornerstones, Chikuzen Sato
- 1996 Treasures, Dolly Parton
- 1996 Louder Than Words, Lionel Richie
- 1996 Mandy Barnett, Mandy Barnett
- 1996 Secrets, Toni Braxton
- 1996 Full Circle, Randy Travis
- 1996 Ten Easy Pieces, Jimmy Webb
- 1996 Fade into Light, Boz Scaggs
- 1997 Higher Ground, Barbra Streisand
- 1997 Under the Covers, Dwight Yoakam
- 1997 Deuces Wild, B.B. King
- 1997 Songs from a Parent to a Child, Art Garfunkel
- 1997 Deborah, Debbie Gibson
- 1997 Evolution, Martina McBride
- 1997 Dark Dear Heart, Holly Cole
- 1997 Open Road, Gary Barlow
- 1997 Let's Talk About Love, Céline Dion
- 1997 All That Matters, Michael Bolton
- 1997 Nothin' But the Taillights, Clint Black
- 1997 Three Chords and the Truth, Sara Evans
- 1997 Talk on Corners, The Corrs
- 1998 Back with a Heart, Olivia Newton-John
- 1998 A Long Way Home, Dwight Yoakam
- 1998 Painted From Memory, Elvis Costello, Burt Bacharach
- 1998 Bathhouse Betty, Bette Midler
- 1998 Jennifer Paige, Jennifer Paige
- 1998 We Ran, Linda Ronstadt
- 1998 Manilow Sings Sinatra, Barry Manilow
- 1998 Time, Lionel Richie
- 1999 D'lectrified, Clint Black
- 1999 Rainbow, Mariah Carey
- 1999 Music Is My Life, Diane Schuur
- 1999 A Love Like Ours, Barbra Streisand
- 1999 Smokin' Section, Tom Scott
- 2000 Inside Job, Don Henley
- 2000 Bette, Bette Midler
- 2000 Friends for Schuur, Diane Schuur
- 2000 Soul & Inspiration, Barry Mann
- 2000 The Heat, Toni Braxton
- 2000 A Merry Little Christmas, Linda Ronstadt
- 2000 The Dreams of Johnny Mercer, Monica Mancini
- 2001 Josh Groban, Josh Groban
- 2001 Love Makes the World, Carole King
- 2001 Mandy Moore, Mandy Moore
- 2001 Renaissance, Lionel Richie
- 2001 Christmas Memories, Barbra Streisand
- 2001 The Well, Jennifer Warnes
- 2002 No Stranger to Shame, Uncle Kracker
- 2002 Songs for Survivors, Graham Nash
- 2002 Cry, Faith Hill
- 2002 Christmas Is Almost Here, Carly Simon
- 2002 Spirit World, Stephen Bruton
- 2002 Together, Lulu
- 2003 Closer, Josh Groban
- 2003 Believe, Aaron Neville
- 2003 The Movie Album, Barbra Streisand
- 2003 Bette Midler Sings the Rosemary Clooney Songbook, Bette Midler
- 2003 Next Big Thing, Vince Gill
- 2003 Christmas Is Almost Here Again, Carly Simon
- 2003 As Time Goes By: The Great American Songbook, Volume II, Rod Stewart
- 2004 Lazy Afternoon, Regina Belle
- 2004 Melancolista, Adam Cohen
- 2004 Spend My Time, Clint Black
- 2004 Deja Vu All Over Again, John Fogerty
- 2004 Miracle, Céline Dion
- 2004 Nightcap, Marilyn Scott
- 2004 Between Here and Gone, Mary Chapin Carpenter
- 2004 Christmas with You, Clint Black
- 2004 Amore Musica, Russell Watson
- 2004 Lucky, Melissa Etheridge
- 2004 Blue Skies, Diana DeGarmo
- 2004 Renee Olstead, Renee Olstead
- 2004 What a Wonderful World, LeAnn Rimes
- 2005 B.B. King & Friends: 80, B.B. King
- 2005 Rock Swings, Paul Anka
- 2005 Libra, Toni Braxton
- 2005 Rock of Ages... Hymns and Faith, Amy Grant
- 2005 Twilight of the Renegades, Jimmy Webb
- 2006 Awake, Josh Groban
- 2006 Still the Same... Great Rock Classics of Our Time, Rod Stewart
- 2006 I Love You, Diana Ross
- 2006 Feeling Good, Randy Crawford, Joe Sample
- 2006 Cool Yule, Bette Midler
- 2006 Givin' It Up, Al Jarreau, George Benson
- 2006 Jazz Academy, Michael Brecker
- 2006 Oceana, Till Brönner
- 2007 Some Enchanted Evening, Art Garfunkel
- 2007 That's Life, Russell Watson
- 2007 The Love Songs, Clint Black
- 2007 Courage, Paula Cole
- 2007 Noël, Josh Groban
- 2007 The Calling, Mary Chapin Carpenter
- 2007 Home at Last, Billy Ray Cyrus
- 2007 East of Angel Town, Peter Cincotti
- 2007 II, Viktor Krauss
- 2007 River: The Joni Letters, Herbie Hancock
- 2008 Circus Money, Walter Becker
- 2008 Like a Fire, Solomon Burke
- 2008 Our Bright Future, Tracy Chapman
- 2008 Soul, Seal
- 2008 Just a Little Lovin', Shelby Lynne
- 2009 At Last, Lynda Carter
- 2009 Believe, Katherine Jenkins
- 2009 Bounce Back, the 3DVB's/Creed Bratton
- 2009 I've Loved These Days, Monica Mancini
- 2009 If on a Winter's Night, Sting
- 2009 Shadows on the Moon, Johnny Rivers
- 2009 Skylark, Renee Olstead
- 2009 Soulbook, Rod Stewart
- 2009 Speak Love, Courtney Fortune
- 2010 Bring Me to Life, Katherine Jenkins
- 2010 The Imagine Project, Herbie Hancock
- 2010 Fly Me to the Moon... The Great American Songbook Volume V Rod Stewart
- 2010 The Secret Sisters, the Secret Sisters
- 2011 Umbigobunker!?, Jay Vaquer
- 2011 A Holiday Carole, Carole King
- 2011 When Ronan Met Burt, Ronan Keating, Burt Bacharach
- 2011 What Matters Most, Barbra Streisand
- 2011 Sound Advice, Patti Austin
- 2012 Merry Christmas, Baby, Rod Stewart
- 2012 Let's Go Out Tonight, Curtis Stigers
- 2012 Songs of December, Paul Anka
- 2012 The Gypsy Queens, The Gypsy Queens
- 2013 Spitfire, LeAnn Rimes
- 2013 Wrote a Song for Everyone, John Fogerty
- 2013 Trust, Alfie Boe
- 2014 Partners, Barbra Streisand
- 2014 Tracks of My Years, Bryan Adams
- 2014 Map to the Treasure: Reimagining Laura Nyro, Billy Childs
- 2015 Currency of Man, Melody Gardot
- 2015 Freedom & Surrender, Lizz Wright
- 2015 No Pier Pressure, Brian Wilson
- 2015 On Purpose, Clint Black
- 2015 Tenderness, JD Souther
- 2015 Wallflower, Diana Krall
- 2016 Down to My Last Bad Habit, Vince Gill
- 2016 Fire on the Floor, Beth Hart
- 2016 Summertime: Willie Nelson Sings Gershwin, Willie Nelson
- 2016 Short Stories, Dominick Farinacci
- 2016 This Girl's in Love, Rumer
- 2016 Fallen Angels, Bob Dylan
- 2016 Encore: Movie Partners Sing Broadway, Barbra Streisand
- 2016 Encore un soir, Céline Dion
- 2017 Sky Trails, David Crosby
- 2017 Seal, Seal
- 2017 Triplicate, Bob Dylan
- 2020 Out of Sane, Clint Black
- 2020 Music... The Air That I Breathe, Cliff Richard

== See also ==
- Katy Lied
