= Midnight Without You =

Studio album by Chris Botti
- Released: May 20, 1997
- Genre: Jazz
- Length: 46:51
- Label: Verve Forecast
- Producer: Chris Botti, Paul Joseph Moore, Kevin Killen, Andy Snitzer

Chris Botti chronology
First Wish (1995)	Midnight Without You (1997)	Slowing Down the World (1999)

Professional ratings
Review scores
Source	Rating
Allmusic	4/5 stars

Midnight Without You is the second studio album by trumpet player Chris Botti. It was released by Verve Forecast Records on May 20, 1997. Botti co-wrote the album title track with The Blue Nile.

== Track listing ==
All music is composed by Chris Botti, except where noted.

No.	Title	Writer(s)	Length
1.	"The Steps of Positano"		3:40
2.	"Midnight Without You"	Botti, Paul Buchanan, Paul Joseph Moore	4:28
3.	"Regroovable"		4:49
4.	"Never Gone"		4:18
5.	"The Way Home"		4:52
6.	"When Rain Falls"		4:25
7.	"Until Now"		3:57
8.	"Mr. Wah"		4:57
9.	"Forgiven"	Botti, Moore	5:08
10.	"Alone in the City"		6:19

== Personnel ==
- Chris Botti – trumpet, keyboards (1–3, 5–7, 9), acoustic piano (5, 9), atmosphere electronics (10)
- Harvey Jones – keyboards (1, 2, 5, 7), atmosphere electronics (4)
- Paul Joseph Moore – keyboards (1–3, 5–10), acoustic piano (2, 6)
- John Levanthal – organ (3)
- Shane Fontayne – guitars (1–5, 10)
- Gerry Leonard – guitars (2, 5, 7, 10)
- Marc Shulman – guitars (2–9)
- Vincent Nguini – guitars (5)
- Larry Saltzman – guitars (9)
- Jeff Allen – bass (1–4, 6)
- Tony Levin – bass (5, 8)
- Bakithi Kumalo – bass (7, 9, 10)
- Shawn Pelton – snare drum (1), drum programming (1), drums (2, 3, 5–9)
- Jerry Marotta – brushed cymbals (1), Native American drums (4, 6, 10)
- Andy Snitzer – drum programming (2, 4, 5, 7, 10), acoustic piano (4, 7, 8)
- Joe Bonadio – tambourine (9), Native American drums (10), tom tom (10)
- Paul Buchanan – vocal (2)
- Jonatha Brooke – vocal (9)

=== Production ===
- Chris Botti – producer, additional engineer
- Paul Joseph Moore – producer, additional engineer
- Kevin Killen – co-producer, engineer, mixing
- Andy Snitzer – co-producer
- Guy Eckstine – executive producer
- Aron Keene – second engineer
- Kristen Koerner – second engineer
- Keith Shortreed – second engineer
- Bob Ludwig – mastering
- Mike Charlasch – production coordination
- Giulio Turturro – art direction
- Sung Lee – design
- Frank Ockenfels – photography
- Marc Silag – management

Studios

- Recorded at BearTracks Studios (Suffren, NY); Shelter Island Sound and Truck Sound Studios (New York City, NY).
- Mixed at Clinton Recording Studio (New York City, NY).
- Mastered at Gateway Mastering (Portland, ME).

== Charts ==
Chart (1997)	Peak position
US Top Contemporary Jazz Albums	13
