= Italia (album) =

Studio album by Chris Botti
- Released: September 25, 2007
- Recorded: July 2006
- Studios: Capitol (Hollywood); AIR Lyndhurst Hall (Hampstead, England)
- Genre: Jazz
- Length: 52:05
- Labels: Columbia, Decca
- Producer: Bobby Colomby

Chris Botti chronology
To Love Again: The Duets (2005)	Italia (2007)	Chris Botti in Boston (2009)

Professional ratings
Review scores
Source	Rating
Allmusic	3.5/5 stars

Italia is an album by Chris Botti that was released by Columbia Records on September 25, 2007. The album focuses on Botti's Italian roots with the title track "Italia" and songs such as "Venice" and "Estaté". Botti partnered with Andrea Bocelli on the song "Italia" and performed it with Bocelli during the 2007 concert at the Teatro del Silenzio. The song was released in 2008 on the DVD titled Vivere Live in Tuscany.

Italia reached #1 on the Top Jazz album charts. Later that year, it was nominated for the Grammy Award for Best Pop Instrumental Album. Italia peaked at #27 on both The Billboard 200 and Top Internet Album charts.

== Track listing ==
No.	Title	Writer(s)	Length
1.	"Deborah's Theme"	Ennio Morricone	2:51
2.	"Italia" (featuring Andrea Bocelli)	Chris Botti, David Foster	5:34
3.	"Venice"	Botti, Dean Parks	4:31
4.	"The Very Thought of You" (featuring Paula Cole)	Ray Noble	4:53
5.	"Gabriel's Oboe"	Morricone	4:16
6.	"I've Grown Accustomed to Her Face" (featuring Dean Martin)	Frederick Loewe, Alan Jay Lerner	3:10
7.	"Caruso"	Lucio Dalla	3:59
8.	"The Way You Look Tonight"	Dorothy Fields, Jerome Kern	4:16
9.	"It Never Entered My Mind"	Lorenz Hart, Richard Rodgers	4:53
10.	"Ave Maria"	Franz Schubert	5:46
11.	"Estaté"	Bruno Brighetti, Bruno Martino	4:06
12.	"Nessun Dorma"	Giacomo Puccini	3:50

== Personnel ==
=== Musicians ===
- Chris Botti – trumpet
- Jeremy Lubbock – arrangements (1, 9, 10), orchestra arrangement adaptation (12)
- David Foster – acoustic piano (2), arrangements (2)
- Gil Goldstein – arrangements (2–8, 11), Fender Rhodes (6)
- Jochem van der Saag – programming (2, 3), sound designer (2, 3)
- Billy Childs – acoustic piano (3–5, 7, 11)
- Randy Waldman – acoustic piano (6)
- Shane Fontayne – electric guitar (2)
- Dean Parks – acoustic guitar (2), guitars (3, 5, 11)
- James Harrah – guitars (6)
- Christian McBride – bass (2, 11)
- Jimmy Johnson – bass (3)
- James Genus – bass (4, 7)
- Brian Bromberg – bass (6, 8)
- Vinnie Colaiuta – drums (2, 3, 6, 8, 11)
- Billy Kilson – drums (4, 7)
- Paul Clarvis – percussion (3, 11)
- Tom Scott – soprano saxophone (3)
- Andrea Bocelli – vocals (2)
- Paula Cole – vocals (4)
- Dean Martin – vocals (6)
- Orchestra of St John's – choir (10)
- John Lubbock – choir conductor (10)

=== Orchestra ===
- Jeremy Lubbock – conductor
- Isobel Griffiths – contractor (1–5, 7–12)
- JoAnn Tominaga – contractor (6)

Horns and Woodwinds

- Meyrick Alexander, Dominic Morgan, Andrew Radford and Richard Skinner – bassoon
- Nicholas Bucknall, Julian Farrell, Don Markese, Nick Moss and Martin Robertson – clarinet
- Andrew Findon, Helen Keen, Steve Kujala, Richard Mitchell, Andy Panayi, Robert Shulgold and Phil Todd – flute
- David Theodore – oboe
- Leila Ward – English horn
- Richard Berry, Justin Hageman, Suzette Moriarty, Brian O'Connor, Martin Owen, David Pyatt, Kurt Snyder and Michael Thompson – French horn
- Dudley Bright, Richard Bullock, Richard Edwards, Mike Hext, Nick Lane, Mark Nightingale and Bruce Otto – trombone
- John Barclay, Guy Barker, Simon Gardner, Gabriel Johnson, Mike Lovett and Derek Watkins – trumpet
- Owen Slade and John Van Houten – tuba

Strings

- David Daniels, Jo Knight, Anthony Lewis, Martin Loveday and Anthony Pleeth – cello
- David Johnson, Steve Mair, Steve McManus, Mary Scully, Allen Walley and Stacey Watton – double bass
- Skaila Kanga – harp
- Gustav Clarkson, Peter Lale, Donald McVay, Edward Vanderspar, Vicci Wardman and Bruce White – viola
- Mark Barrow, John Bradbury, Michael Davis (leader), Jonathan Evans-Jones, Boguslaw Kostecki, Julian Leaper, Perry Montague-Mason, Jonathan Rees, Emlyn Singleton, Chris Tombling, Rose Warren-Green, Debbie Widdup, Paul Willey (second violin leader), David Woodcock and Warren Zilenski – violin

Percussion

- Gary Kettel and Frank Ricotti

== Production ==
- Bobby Colomby – producer
- Matt Evers – associate producer
- Haydn Bendall – recording
- Steve Genewick – recording, mixing
- Jake Jackson – recording
- Al Schmitt – recording, mixing
- Bill Smith – recording
- Vlado Meller – mastering at Sony Music Studios (New York, NY)
- David Bett – art direction
- Meghan Foley – art direction
- Fabrizio Ferri – photography

== Charts and certifications ==
=== Weekly charts ===
Chart (2008–10)	Peak position
Polish Albums (ZPAV)	1
US Billboard 200	27
US Top Jazz Albums (Billboard)	1
Chart (2014)	Peak position
UK Jazz & Blues Albums (Official Charts)	14

=== Year-end charts ===
Chart (2008)	Position
US Billboard 200	200

=== Certifications ===
Region	Certification	Certified units/sales
Poland (ZPAV)	Platinum	20,000^{*}
^{*} Sales figures based on certification alone.
