= When I Fall in Love (Chris Botti album) =

Studio album by Chris Botti
- Released: September 28, 2004
- Genre: Jazz
- Length: 58:48
- Label: Columbia
- Producer: Bobby Colomby, Jeff Lorber, Brian Bromberg

Chris Botti chronology
A Thousand Kisses Deep (2003)	When I Fall in Love (2004)	To Love Again: The Duets (2005)

Professional ratings
Review scores
Source	Rating
Allmusic	4.5/5 stars

When I Fall in Love is the seventh studio album by trumpet player Chris Botti. It was released by Columbia Records on September 28, 2004, and peaked at number 1 on the Billboard Top Jazz Albums chart. The album has sold more than 500,000 copies and has been certified Gold by the Recording Industry Association of America (RIAA).

== Track listing ==
No.	Title	Writer(s)	Length
1.	"When I Fall in Love"	Edward Heyman, Victor Young	4:22
2.	"What'll I Do?" (featuring Paula Cole)	Irving Berlin	5:09
3.	"No Ordinary Love"	Sade Adu, Stuart Matthewman	6:04
4.	"My Romance"	Lorenz Hart, Richard Rodgers	3:21
5.	"Let's Fall in Love"	Harold Arlen, Ted Koehler	3:41
6.	"Cinema Paradiso" (featuring Billy Childs)	Andrea Morricone, Ennio Morricone	4:57
7.	"Someone to Watch Over Me"	George Gershwin, Ira Gershwin	4:36
8.	"La Belle Dame Sans Regrets" (featuring Dominic Miller and Sting)	Miller, Sting	5:31
9.	"Nearness of You"	Paul Edgar Johnson	3:11
10.	"How Love Should Be" (featuring Paula Cole)	Jeremy Lubbock	4:03
11.	"Make Someone Happy"	Betty Comden, Adolph Green, Jule Styne	4:09
12.	"One for My Baby"	Harold Arlen, Johnny Mercer	4:53
13.	"Time to Say Goodbye (Con te partirò)"	Lucio Quarantotto, Francesco Sartori	4:44

== Personnel ==
- Chris Botti – trumpet, vocals (2)
- Federico Gonzalez Peña – acoustic piano (1)
- Greg Phillinganes – acoustic piano (2, 10)
- Billy Childs – acoustic piano (3, 6, 8, 9, 11, 12), Fender Rhodes (5), arrangements (5, 9, 12)
- Jeff Lorber – keyboards (3), arrangements (3)
- Shane Fontayne – guitars (1, 2)
- Dean Parks – guitars (3, 6, 8, 9, 11)
- Mitch Dalton – semi-acoustic jazz guitar (7)
- Dominic Miller – guitars (8)
- Jon Ossman – bass (1)
- Brian Bromberg – bass (2, 3, 5, 6, 8–11), arrangements (3)
- Alec Dankworth – double bass (7)
- Billy Kilson – drums (1, 6, 11)
- Vinnie Colaiuta – drums (2, 3, 5, 8–10)
- Ralph Salmins – drums (7)
- Paulinho da Costa – percussion (1, 5, 6, 8, 11)
- Bob Sheppard – saxophone (3)
- Marc Shulman – arrangements (1)
- Gil Goldstein – orchestra arrangements (1)
- Bobby Colomby – arrangements (3)
- Mike Anthony – vocal arrangements (3)
- Jeremy Lubbock – arrangements (4, 7, 10, 13)
- Paula Cole – vocals (2, 10)
- Jill Zadeh – vocals (3)
- Sting – vocals (8)

=== The London Session Orchestra (Tracks 1, 2 & 4-13) ===
- Isobel Griffiths – orchestra contractor
- Mitch Dalton – semi-acoustic jazz guitar, acoustic guitar
- Ralph Salmins – drums

Brass and Woodwinds

- Nigel Hitchcock – alto saxophone
- Jamie Talbot – tenor saxophone, bass clarinet
- Anthony Pike and Nick Rodwell – clarinet
- Jane Marshall – cor anglais
- Helen Keen, Karen Jones, Stan Sulzmann and Phil Todd – alto flute, flute
- Andy Panayi – bass flute
- David Theodore – oboe
- Richard Bissill, David Pyatt and Michael Thompson – French horn
- Dave Stewart – bass trombone, euphonium
- Pete Beachill, Richard Edwards and Mark Nightingale – trombone, tenor trombone
- John Barclay, Guy Barker and Derek Watkins – trumpet, flugelhorn

Strings

- Dave Daniels, Caroline Dearnley, Paul Kegg, Anthony Lewis, Anthony Pleeth and Frank Schaefer – cello
- Alec Dankworth, Patrick Lannigan, Chris Laurence and Mary Scully – double bass
- Fiona Hibbert – harp
- Peter Lale, George Robertson, Edward Vanderspar, Ivo Van Der Werff, Vicci Wardman and Bruce White – viola
- Thomas Bowes, Jonathan Evans-Jones, Roger Garland (2nd leader), Patrick Kiernan, Boguslaw Kostecki, Julian Leaper, Rita Manning, Steve Morris, Maciej Rakowski, Jackie Shave, Kenneth Sillito (1st leader), Cathy Thompson, Debbie Widdup, Paul Willey, Rolf Wilson (1st leader) and David Woodcock – violin

== Production ==
- Bobby Colomby – producer (1, 2, 4–13)
- Brian Bromberg – producer (3)
- Jeff Lorber – producer (3), engineer (3)
- Sean Douglas – associate producer
- Al Schmitt – engineer (1–7, 9–12), mixing
- Steve Genewick – assistant engineer (1–7, 9–12), Pro Tools operator (1–7, 9–12)
- Elliot Scheiner – engineer (8)
- Brian Montgomery – assistant engineer (8), Pro Tools operator (8)
- Haydn Bendall – orchestra engineer (1, 2, 4–13)
- Chris Barrett – assistant orchestra engineer (1, 2, 4–13), Pro Tools operator
- Robert Hadley – mastering
- Doug Sax – mastering
- Mary Maurer – art direction, design
- Jill Gifford – design assistant
- Fabrizio Ferri – photography
- Marc Silag – management

Studios

- Recorded at Capitol Studios (Hollywood, CA); JHL Sound (Pacific Palisades, CA); Avatar Studios (New York, NY).
- Orchestra recorded at AIR Lyndhurst Hall (London, UK).
- Mixed at Capitol Studios.
- Mastered at The Mastering Lab (Hollywood, CA).

== Charts ==
=== Weekly charts ===
Weekly chart performance
Chart (2004–2005)	Peak position
Canadian Albums (Nielsen SoundScan)	56
US Billboard 200	37
US Top Jazz Albums (Billboard)	1

=== Year-end charts ===
Year-end chart performance
Chart (2005)	Position
US Billboard 200	166

== Certifications ==
Certifications
Region	Certification	Certified units/sales
United States (RIAA)	Gold	500,000^{^}
^{^} Shipments figures based on certification alone.
