= Slowing Down the World =

Studio album by Chris Botti
- Released: June 22, 1999
- Genre: Jazz
- Length: 49:38
- Label: GRP
- Producer: Chris Botti, Harvey Jones, Andy Snitzer, Eric Calvi, Bobby Colomby, Larry Klein

Chris Botti chronology
| Midnight Without You (1997) | Slowing Down the World (1999) | Night Sessions (2001) |

Professional ratings
Review scores
| Source | Rating |
|---|---|
| Allmusic | 2.5/5 stars |

Slowing Down the World is the third studio album by trumpet player Chris Botti. It was released by GRP Records on June 22, 1999. Botti himself provided vocals on "Same Girl".

== Track listing ==
All music is composed by Chris Botti, except where noted.

| No. | Title | Writer(s) | Length |
|---|---|---|---|
| 1. | "Irresistible Bliss" | | 5:02 |
| 2. | "The Look" | | 4:22 |
| 3. | "Drive Time" | | 5:33 |
| 4. | "In the Wee Small Hours of the Morning" | Bob Hilliard, David Mann | 4:28 |
| 5. | "The Open Touch" | | 6:00 |
| 6. | "Under a Painted Sky" | | 4:13 |
| 7. | "Why Not" | | 3:38 |
| 8. | "The Place Between Us" | | 4:38 |
| 9. | "Same Girl" | Randy Newman | 3:44 |
| 10. | "Where I'm Calling From" | Botti, Larry Klein | 5:50 |
| 11. | "Letting Go" | Anne Dudley | 2:09 |

== Personnel ==
- Chris Botti – trumpet, keyboards (1, 3, 4, 6, 7), arrangements (4), drum programming (7), vocals (9)
- Harvey Jones – keyboards (1–8), acoustic piano (6)
- Jeff Lorber – acoustic piano (1), electric piano (1, 3, 7, 10)
- Jeff Young – acoustic piano (3), electric piano (3, 4, 8)
- Bob James – electric piano (5)
- C. J. Vanston – keyboards (9)
- Shane Fontayne – guitars (1, 8, 10)
- Tim Pierce – guitars (1–5, 7), acoustic guitar (6)
- Marc Shulman – guitars (1, 7)
- Dean Parks – acoustic guitar (6)
- Greg Leisz – pedal steel guitar (6, 10)
- John Ossman – bass (1, 3, 7)
- Armand Sabal Lecco – piccolo bass (2)
- Tony Levin – bass (2)
- Nathan East – bass (4, 5, 8)
- Larry Klein – bass (6, 10)
- Garry Hughes – drum programming (1, 4, 5), keyboards (8)
- John Robinson – drums (1, 3–7)
- Peter Erskine – drums (2, 4, 8, 10)
- Shawn Pelton – hi-hat (1)
- Alex Acuña – percussion (1–3, 5, 6, 8)
- Joe Bonadio – percussion (4)
- Jerry Marotta – percussion (4)
- Michael Davis – trombone (3)
- Anne Dudley – string arrangements (1–3, 5, 11), orchestra conductor (1–5, 11)
- Rob Mathes – arrangements (4)
- Gavyn Wright – concertmaster (1–5, 11)
- The London Session Orchestra – orchestra (1–5, 11)
- Jonatha Brooke – vocals (2)
- Sting – vocals (4)

=== Production ===
- Chris Botti – producer (1–8, 11), mixing (9), liner notes
- Eric Calvi – co-producer (1–8, 11)
- Harvey Jones – producer (1–8, 11)
- Andy Snitzer – producer (1–8, 11)
- Bobby Colomby – producer (9), mixing (9)
- Larry Klein – producer (10)
- Chris Roberts – executive producer
- Marc Silag – executive producer
- Dan Marnien – engineer
- Greg Burns – assistant engineer
- Walter Clisson – assistant engineer
- David Cole – assistant engineer
- Andy Haller – assistant engineer
- Larry Hirsch – assistant engineer
- Tom Jenkins – assistant engineer
- Simon Osborne – assistant engineer
- Steve Price – assistant engineer
- Ray Pyle – assistant engineer
- Andy Smith – assistant engineer
- Mike Shipley – mixing (1–8, 10, 11)
- Steve Hall – mastering at Future Disc (North Hollywood, California).
- Hollis King – art direction, design
- Rocky Schenck – photography

== Charts ==
| Chart (1999) | Peak position |
|---|---|
| US Top Contemporary Jazz Albums | 13 |
