= First Wish =

Studio album by Chris Botti
- Released: February 28, 1995
- Studio: Bearsville Studios (Bearsville, New York); AGF Studios (New York City, New York).
- Genre: Jazz
- Length: 45:50
- Label: Verve Forecast
- Producer: Chris Botti, Kevin Killen, Andy Snitzer

Chris Botti chronology
First Wish (1995)	Midnight Without You (1997)

Professional ratings
Review scores
Source	Rating
Allmusic	3/5 stars

First Wish is the first album by the trumpet player Chris Botti. It was released by Verve Forecast Records on February 28, 1995.

== Track listing ==
All music is composed by Chris Botti, except where noted.

No.	Title	Writer(s)	Length
1.	"Worlds Outside"		4:35
2.	"On the Night Ride"		4:28
3.	"First Wish"		5:02
4.	"Like I Do Now"	Botti, Edie Brickell, Paul Joseph Moore	4:53
5.	"Cubism"		5:32
6.	"Through Tin Hearts"		4:28
7.	"Longing"		5:08
8.	"Nerve Central"		4:51
9.	"Fade to Day"		5:19
10.	"A Few More Days, A Few More Weeks"		1:34

== Personnel ==
- Chris Botti – trumpet, keyboards, programming (1–3, 5, 6), tambourine (9), acoustic piano (10)
- Paul Joseph Moore – keyboards, acoustic piano (1), Omnichord (8)
- Andy Snitzer – Rhodes electric piano (1), programming (1, 5, 6)
- Mitchell Froom – Wurlitzer electric piano (5), organ (8)
- Kevin Killen – Omnichord (8)
- Larry Saltzman – guitars (1, 5, 7)
- Shane Fontayne – guitars (2, 6)
- Paul Livant – guitars (3)
- Marc Shulman – guitars (3, 4, 8, 9)
- Dominic Kanza – guitars (5)
- Pino Palladino – bass (1, 2, 4–9)
- Steve Ferrone – drums (1, 3, 5, 7, 8)
- Jerry Marotta – drums (2, 4, 6, 9)
- Joe Bonadio – percussion (2, 3, 4, 7)
- Cyro Baptista – surdo and shaker (8)
- Michael Brecker – tenor saxophone (5)
- Sandra Park – violin (6)
- Rebecca Young – violin (6)
- Morris Goldberg – African flutes (7)
- Edie Brickell – vocals (4)

=== Production ===
- Guy Eckstine – executive producer
- Chris Botti – producer
- Kevin Killen – producer, engineer, mixing
- Andy Snitzer – co-producer (1, 3, 5)
- Andrew Page – additional recording
- Marc Silag – production coordinator
- David Lau – art direction
- Sheryl Lutz-Brown – art direction
- Étsuko Iseki – design
- Gary St. Clair – design
- Brad Hitz – photography

== Charts ==
Chart (1995)	Peak position
US Top Contemporary Jazz Albums	18
