= Byzantium (band) =

1970s English rock band

- Origin: London
- Genres: Progressive rock; psychedelia; country rock; pop
- Years active: 1970–1975
- Label: A&M Records
- Past members: Steve Corduner; Mick Barakan (Shane Fontayne); Chaz Jankel; Robin Lamble; Nico Ramsden; Jamie Rubenstein

Byzantium were an English rock band of the 1970s who released three albums and performed one Peel Session. They are perhaps best remembered for their role in the early careers of Shane Fontayne, Chaz Jankel and Robin Sylvester.

== Formation ==
Formed as a school band at University College School, Hampstead, London, the original lineup included Nico Ramsden, Robin Lamble & Stevie Corduner who were soon joined by Chaz Jankel. Robin Sylvester and Jamie Rubinstein, who were both also studying at UCS were both contributors at this time, Jamie by way of songwriting and Robin in his role of recording engineer, arranger and later joint producer.

Byzantium were due to play at the famous Greasy Truckers Party in February 1972, but could not appear due to a power-cut, however, they were signed up by A&M Records. They did play the Great Western Express festival in Bardney in May 1972 featuring Mick Barakan (Shane Fontayne) as well as a young Chaz Jankel and guitarist Neville Nixon from Third Ear Band.

In 1972 Lamble, Jankel, Ramsden and Corduner recorded Byzantium, engineered by Roy Thomas Baker and produced by Stuart Taylor & Robin Sylvester at Trident Studios, London, on which Rubenstein, Alan Skidmore (sax) and Frank Ricotti (timpani) appeared as guests. Between the recording and the release of the album, Ramsden left, and Rubenstein and Barakan rejoined.

The following album Seasons Changing featured Lamble, Jankel, Barakan, Rubenstein and Corduner, augmented by B. J. Cole on pedal steel, Ricotti on Percussion and David Hentschel and Sylvester on synthesisers. Jankel's interest was moving towards soul music, so he left, and shortly after A&M dropped Byzantium.

In 1974 they recorded Live and Studio with a band line up comprising Jamie Rubenstein on 12 string guitar, guitarist Mick Barakan (later known as Shane Fontayne), bassist Robin Lamble and drummer Steve Corduner. The album, comprising one side of 5 studio tracks and one of 3 live tracks, predominantly in a psychedelic style, was self produced as a promotion, the back cover stating "Byzantium are seeking a hard working agency, recording company & publishing company". Only 100 were pressed, making it extremely collectable, and although "fans considered it their best set, ..... few were actually in a position to know".

The band played their only Peel Session in April 1974, by which time their line up was Rubinstein, Barakan, Lamble and Corduner. Byzantium continued touring until late in 1975 when they played their final concert at The Roundhouse.

== Subsequent careers ==
- Steve Corduner – later recorded with Nasty Pop, Twist and Nico.
- Shane Fontayne (Mick Barakan) – later worked with Ian Hunter, Bruce Springsteen, Van Zant, Chris Botti, Joe Cocker and others.
- David Hentschel – worked with artists including Elton John, Van der Graaf Generator, Renaissance and Blood, Sweat & Tears.
- Chaz Jankel became known for his co-writing with Ian Dury, performed with many other artists and had a successful solo career.
- Robin Lamble – had a long career with Al Stewart, but also played with Juice Newton and others.
- Nico Ramsden – played with Mike Oldfield and recorded with Gong, Rick Wakeman, Sad Cafe, The Proclaimers and others.
- Jamie Rubenstein – gave up the music business, and must not be confused with the guitarist of the same name in rap band "Borialis"
- Robin Sylvester – engineered many Rory Gallagher albums, played bass for Christine McVie and others, and still plays in Ratdog.

== Discography ==
=== Albums ===
- Live and Studio (Private Pressing) 1974, re-released on CD (Arkama) 2005, with 4 bonus tracks
- Byzantium (A&M) 1972
- Seasons Changing (A&M) 1973

=== Singles ===
- "Oh Darling" / "Move with the Time" 1971
- "Flashing Silver Hope" 1971
- "Suzie Bumkins Griddled Fiddle" 1972
- "What a Coincidence" / "My Season's Changing with the Sun" (A&M) 1973
