= Night Sessions =

Studio album by Chris Botti
- Released: October 2, 2001
- Genre: Jazz
- Length: 52:20
- Label: Columbia
- Producer: Kipper

Chris Botti chronology
Slowing Down the World (1999)	Night Sessions (2001)	December (2002)

Professional ratings
Review scores
Source	Rating
Allmusic	4/5 stars

Night Sessions is the fourth studio album by trumpet player Chris Botti. This is his first album to be released by Columbia Records on October 2, 2001.

I had been on the road for two straight years when I found myself with a window of only ten weeks to write and record this album. I felt energized by the challenge and asked my friend, Kipper, to co-write and produce. Renting a house in the Hollywood Hills where we could work and live, with ample room for other musicians and friends, we started composing material. We sensed freedom after dark - the phone was quieter and there were less distractions around the house as the light of the LA basin began to glow. We recorded only after the sun had set, often until it rose the next morning. These are the "Night Sessions." Enjoy. Chris Botti

— Chris Botti, CD insert

== Track listing ==
No.	Title	Writer(s)	Length
1.	"Lisa"	Chris Botti, Kipper, Dominic Miller	5:08
2.	"Miami Overnight"	Botti, Kipper, Billy Childs	4:34
3.	"Streets Ahead"	Botti, Kipper	3:43
4.	"Interlude"	Botti, Kipper, Childs	0:30
5.	"All Would Envy"	Sting	5:01
6.	"Best Time"	Botti, Kipper	5:01
7.	"When I See You"	Botti, Kipper	4:16
8.	"You Move Me"	Botti, Kipper, Marc Shulman, Camilla	5:09
9.	"Blue Horizon"	Botti, Kipper, Childs	4:10
10.	"Light the Stars"	Botti, Kipper	4:42
11.	"Through an Open Window"	Botti, Kipper, Miller, Jeff Young	4:16
12.	"Easter Parade"	Paul Buchanan, Paul Joseph Moore	5:38

== Personnel ==
- Chris Botti – trumpet (1–3, 5–12)
- Kipper – keyboards (1–3, 5–12), drum programming (6, 9)
- Billy Childs – additional keyboards (2, 5, 6, 9), keyboards (4)
- Jeff Lorber – additional keyboards (2, 3)
- Jeff Young – additional keyboards (2, 3, 5, 9, 10, 12)
- Dominic Miller – guitars (1–3, 5–7, 9–11)
- Shane Fontayne – guitars (2)
- Heitor Pereira – guitars (7)
- Marc Shulman – guitars (8)
- Jimmy Johnson – bass (1, 3, 8–11)
- Jon Ossman – bass (2)
- Christian McBride – bass (5, 7, 12)
- Abe Laboriel, Jr. – drums (1, 2, 7, 9, 12)
- Vinnie Colaiuta – drums (3, 5, 6, 8, 10, 11)
- Luis Conte – percussion (2, 5, 7, 9, 10, 12)
- Kazu Matsui – shakuhachi (1)
- Bill Reichenbach Jr. – trombone (3, 6)
- Shawn Colvin – vocals (5)
- Lani Groves – additional vocals (5)
- Camilla – vocals (8)

=== Production ===
- Executive Producer – Bobby Colomby
- Producer – Kipper
- Engineers – Chris Botti, Kevin Killen, Kipper and Christopher J. Roberts.
- Additional Engineers – Rick Behrens, Jay Goin, Jimmy Hoyson, Matt Marrin, Jonathan Merritt, Fred Remmert and Ted Spencer.
- Recorded at Sony Music Studios (Los Angeles, CA); Cedar Creek Recording (Austin, TX); Ted Spencer Recording (New York City, NY).
- Mixing – Ed Cherney and Nathaniel Kunkel
- Mix Assistant on Tracks 2, 7 & 10 – Wesley Seidman
- Mixed at The Mix Room (Burbank, CA); The Village Recorder (Los Angeles, CA); Capitol Studios (Hollywood, CA); Record Plant (New York City, NY).
- Mastered by Ted Jensen at Sterling Sound (New York City, NY).
- Art Direction and Design – Mary Maurer
- Silhouettes – Isabel Snyder
- Photography – Fabrizio Ferri

== Charts ==
Chart (2001)	Peak position
US Top Jazz Albums	4
