= A Thousand Kisses Deep =

A Thousand Kisses Deep may refer to:

- "A Thousand Kisses Deep", a song on Leonard Cohen's 2001 album Ten New Songs
- A Thousand Kisses Deep (album), 2003, by Chris Botti (which also includes an eponymous track)
- A Thousand Kisses Deep (film), a 2011 English film
