= Bob Sheppard (musician) =

American jazz saxophonist (born 1952)

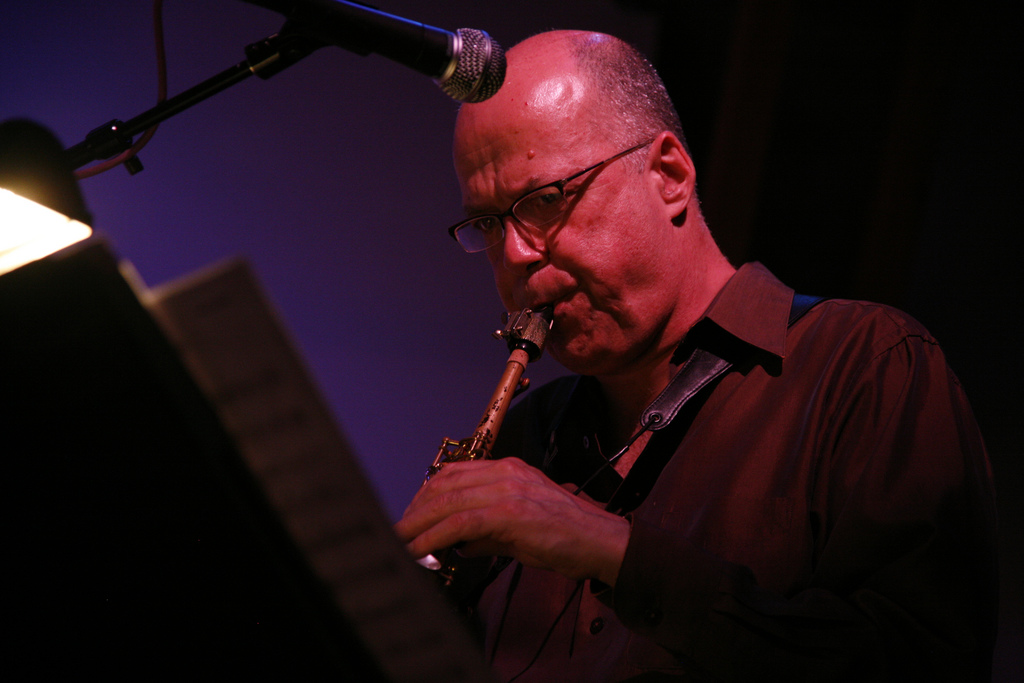

Background information
- Born: May 4, 1952 (age 74); Trenton, New Jersey, U.S.
- Genres: Jazz, jazz fusion
- Occupations: Musician, composer, educator
- Instruments: Saxophone, clarinet, flute
- Years active: 1970–present
- Labels: Challenge, BFM Jazz
- Website: www.bobsheppard.net

Bob Sheppard is an American jazz musician who plays saxophone, clarinet, and flute. He has been a touring and studio musician for albums, film, and television and has released solo albums.

He has worked with Billy Childs, Chick Corea, Leonard Cohen, Herbie Hancock, Freddie Hubbard, Steely Dan, Mike Stern, Randy Brecker, Michael Brecker, Scott Henderson, Lyle Mays, Peter Erskine, John Beasley, Bob Mintzer, and Joni Mitchell. He has taught at the Thorton School Of Music at the University of Southern California.

He plays the saxophone solo on Al Jarreau's rendition of "Blue Skies" which accompanies the end credits of the film Glengarry Glen Ross.

== Discography ==
=== As leader ===
- Tell-Tale Signs (Windham Hill, 1991)
- Lava Jazz, The Lounge Art Ensemble (Fuzzy Music, 1997)
- In the Now (Sirocco Jazz, 2002)
- Music for Moderns, The Lounge Art Ensemble (Fuzzy Music, 2005)
- From the Hip with David Kikoski, Dave Carpenter, Gary Novak (BFM Jazz, 2013)

=== As sideman ===
With Toshiko Akiyoshi-Lew Tabackin Big Band

- From Toshiko with Love (Baystate, 1981)
- European Memoirs (Baystate, 1982)

With John Beasley

- Cauldron (Windham Hill, 1992)
- A Change of Heart (Windham Hill, 1993)
- John Beasley Presents MONK'estra Vol. 1 (Mack Avenue, 2016)
- John Beasley Presents MONK'estra Vol. 2 (Mack Avenue, 2017)

With Chris Botti

- December (Columbia, 2002)
- A Thousand Kisses Deep (Columbia, 2003)
- When I Fall in Love (Columbia, 2004)

With Billy Childs

- Midland (Lunacy 1985)
- Take for Example This...(Windham Hill, 1988)
- Twilight Is Upon Us (Windham Hill, 1989)
- His April Touch (Windham Hill, 1991)
- I've Known Rivers (Stretch, 1995)

With Chick Corea

- Live at the Blue Note (Stretch, 1998)
- Change (Stretch, 1999)
- Corea Concerto: Spain for Sextet & Orchestra/Piano Concerto No. 1 (Sony Classical/Stretch, 1999)

With Bill Cunliffe

- A Rare Connection (Discovery, 1994)
- How My Heart Sings (Torii, 2003)
- Imaginacion (Torii, 2005)
- The Blues and the Abstract Truth (Resonance, 2008)

With Frank Macchia

- Saxolollapalooza (Cacophony, 2008)
- Son of Folk Songs for Jazzers (Cacophony, 2010)
- Folk Songs for Jazzers (Cacophony, 2010)
- Grease Mechanix (Cacophony, 2013)

With Dan Siegel

- Departure (M&I, 2006)
- Sphere (2009)
- Indigo (2014)

With Robbie Williams

- Candy (Island, 2012)
- Take the Crown (Island, 2012)
- Swings Both Ways (Island, 2013)

With others

- Karrin Allyson, 'Round Midnight (Concord Jazz, 2011)
- Ernestine Anderson, Blues, Dues & Love News (Qwest/Warner Bros. 1996)
- Marc Antoine, Madrid (1998)
- Kenny Barron, Table for Two Menus and Music Volume XIX (2004)
- Jeff Beal, Objects in the Mirror (Triloka, 1990)
- Walter Becker, 11 Tracks of Whack (Giant, 1994)
- Cheryl Bentyne, the Book of Love (Telarc, 2006)
- Michael Bolton, (Timeless, (the Classics) 1992)
- Wayne Bergeron, Plays Well with Others (Concord Jazz, 2007)
- Gordon Brisker, New Beginning (Discovery, 1987)
- Michael Buble, Michael Buble (143/Reprise, 2003)
- Clifford Carter, Walkin' into the Sun (Soul Coast/Nova, 1994)
- Ray Charles, Genius Loves Company (2004)
- Stanley Clarke, The Stanley Clarke Band (Heads Up, 2010)
- Alf Clausen, Swing Can Really Hang You Up the Most (NoDak, 2005)
- Ryan Cohan, One Sky (Motema, 2007)
- Leonard Cohen, Dear Heather (Columbia, 2004)
- Bob Curnow, The Music of Pat Metheny & Lyle Mays (MAMA, 1994)
- Denise Donatelli, What Lies Within (Savant, 2008)
- Denise Donatelli, Find a Heart (Savant, 2015)
- George Duke, Deja Vu (Heads Up, 2010)
- Sheena Easton, No Strings (MCA, 1993)
- Kurt Elling, Flirting with Twilight (Blue Note, 2001)
- Peter Erskine, Dr. Um (Fuzzy Music, 2016)
- Peter Erskine, Second Opinion (Fuzzy Music, 2016)
- Brandon Fields, Other Places (Nova, 1990)
- Julia Fordham, China Blue (Little Boo 2008)
- David Garfield, Tribute to Jeff (Intercord 1997)
- Elliot Goldenthal, Public Enemies (Decca, 2009)
- Rita Coolidge, And So Is Love (King 2005)
- Mike Garson, The Oxnard Sessions Volume One (Reference 1990)
- Grant Geissman, Take Another Look (Bluemoon, 1990)
- Grant Geissman, Business As Usual (Positive Music 1995)
- Billy Griffin, Like Water (Expansion, 2006)
- Herbie Hancock, Then and Now (Verve, 2008)
- Scott Henderson, Spears (Passport, 1985)
- Freddie Hubbard, Live (Just Jazz 1995)
- Justin Hurwitz, La La Land (Interscope, 2016)
- Mark Isham, Little Man Tate (Varese Sarabande, 1991)
- Mark Isaacs, Resurgence (ABC Jazz 2007)
- Molly Johnson, Meaning to Tell Ya (Belle 2018)
- Rickie Lee Jones, Flying Cowboys (Geffen, 1989)
- Rickie Lee Jones, Pop Pop (Geffen, 1991)
- Kristin Korb, In the Meantime (Double K Music, 2009)
- Joe LaBarbera, Live! (Jazz Compass, 2001)
- John LaBarbera, On the Wild Side (Jazz Compass, 2003)
- John LaBarbera, Fantazm (Jazz Compass, 2005)
- Andy LaVerne, PleasureSeekers (Triloka, 1991)
- Jeff Lorber, He Had a Hat (Blue Note, 2007)
- Kevin Mahogany, Big Band Zebra (Mahogany Jazz, Lightyear 2005)
- The Manhattan Transfer, The Offbeat of Avenues (1991)
- Barry Manilow, The Greatest Love Songs of All Time (Arista, 2010)
- Lyle Mays, The Ludwigsburg Concert (Jazzhaus, 2015)
- Bette Midler, Sings the Rosemary Clooney Songbook (Columbia)
- Joni Mitchell, Shine (Hear Music, 2007)
- Laura Pausini, Laura XMas (Atlantic, 2016)
- Dianne Reeves, That Day (Blue Note/EMI 1997)
- Rick Rhodes, Indian Summer (Beverly, 1995)
- Lee Ritenour, A Twist of Rit (Concord/Universal, 2015)
- John "JR" Robinson, Platinum (Home Court 2010)
- Dennis Rowland, Get Here (Concord Vista 1996)
- Arturo Sandoval, Dear Diz (Concord Jazz, 2012)
- Boz Scaggs, Speak Low (Decca, 2008)
- John Serry Jr., Exhibition (Chrysalis, 1979)
- David Sanborn, Closer (Verve, 2005)
- Sister Cristina, Sister Cristina (Universal, 2014)
- Rod Stewart, Stardust... The Great American Songbook Volume III
- Rod Stewart, Thanks for the Memory... The Great American Songbook Volume IV (Sony BMG, 2005)
- Steely Dan, Alive in America (Giant, 1995)
- Tribal Tech, Dr. Hee (Passport, 1987)
- Steve Tyrell, A New Standard (Atlantic, 1999)
- Johnnie Valentino, Stingy Brim (OmniTone, 2006)
- Chris Walden, Full-On! (Origin, 2014)
- Chris Walden, Home of My Heart (Origin, 2005)
- Neil Young, Storytone (Reprise, 2014)
