= Chris Botti in Boston =

2009 album by Chris Botti

Live album by Chris Botti
- Released: March 31, 2009
- Recorded: September 18–19, 2008
- Venues: Symphony Hall, Boston
- Genre: Jazz
- Label: Decca
- Producer: Bobby Colomby

Chris Botti chronology
Italia (2007)	Chris Botti in Boston (2009)	This Is Chris Botti (2011)

Chris Botti in Boston is a live album by American jazz trumpeter Chris Botti. It was released on CD and DVD on March 31, 2009, through Decca Records.

The album was certified platinum in the US and diamond in Poland. It was nominated at the 2010 Grammy Awards in categories Best Pop Instrumental Album and Best Long Form Music Video, while "Emmanuel" received a nomination for Best Instrumental Arrangement.

== Track listing ==
CD
No.	Title	Writer(s)	Length
1.	"Ave Maria"	Franz Schubert	3:18
2.	"When I Fall in Love"	Victor Young, Edward Heyman	8:33
3.	"Seven Days" (featuring Sting and Dominic Miller)	Sting	4:53
4.	"Emmanuel" (featuring Lucia Micarelli)	Michel Colombier	5:55
5.	"I've Got You Under My Skin" (featuring Katharine McPhee)	Cole Porter	4:16
6.	"Cinema Paradiso" (featuring Yo-Yo Ma)	Andrea Morricone, Ennio Morricone	7:19
7.	"Broken Vow" (featuring Josh Groban)	Lara Fabian, Walter Afanasieff	5:00
8.	"Flamenco Sketches"	Miles Davis, Bill Evans	8:56
9.	"Glad to Be Unhappy" (featuring John Mayer)	Richard Rodgers, Lorenz Hart	5:33
10.	"Hallelujah"	Leonard Cohen	3:00
11.	"Smile" (featuring Steven Tyler)	Charlie Chaplin, John Turner, Geoffrey Parsons	5:01
12.	"If I Ever Lose My Faith in You" (featuring Sting and Dominic Miller)	Sting	5:24
13.	"Time to Say Goodbye"	Francesco Sartori, Lucio Quarantotto	5:14
Total length:			72:28

DVD
No.	Title	Writer(s)	Length
1.	"Ave Maria"	Franz Schubert
2.	"When I Fall in Love"	Victor Young, Edward Heyman
3.	"Caruso"	Lucio Dalla
4.	"Seven Days" (featuring Sting and Dominic Miller)	Sting
5.	"Broken Vow" (featuring Josh Groban)	Lara Fabian, Walter Afanasieff
6.	"Flamenco Sketches"	Miles Davis, Bill Evans
7.	"Hallelujah"	Leonard Cohen
8.	"I've Got You Under My Skin" (featuring Katharine McPhee)	Cole Porter
9.	"Cinema Paradiso" (featuring Yo-Yo Ma)	Andrea Morricone, Ennio Morricone
10.	"The Look of Love" (featuring Sy Smith)	Burt Bacharach, Hal David
11.	"Emmanuel" (featuring Lucia Micarelli)	Michel Colombier
12.	"Glad to Be Unhappy" (featuring John Mayer)	Richard Rodgers, Lorenz Hart
13.	"Cryin'" (featuring Steven Tyler)	Steven Tyler, Joe Perry, Taylor Rhodes
14.	"Smile" (featuring Steven Tyler)	Charlie Chaplin, John Turner, Geoffrey Parsons
15.	"Indian Summer"	Mark Goldenberg
16.	"Shape of My Heart" (featuring Sting and Josh Groban)	Sting, Dominic Miller
17.	"If I Ever Lose My Faith in You" (featuring Sting and Dominic Miller)	Sting
18.	"Time to Say Goodbye"	Francesco Sartori, Lucio Quarantotto

== Charts ==
Chart (2010)	Peak position
Polish Albums (ZPAV)	6
Chart (2013)	Peak position
US Billboard 200	13
US Top Jazz Albums (Billboard)	2
Chart (2014)	Peak position
Polish Albums (ZPAV)	1

== Certifications ==
Region	Certification	Certified units/sales
Poland (ZPAV)	Diamond	50,000^{*}
United States (RIAA)	Platinum	1,000,000^{^}
^{*} Sales figures based on certification alone.^{^} Shipments figures based on certification alone.
