= December (Chris Botti album) =

Studio album by Chris Botti
- Released: October 22, 2002
- Recorded: 2002
- Studios: Capitol Studios (Hollywood, California); AIR Lyndhurst Hall (London, England, UK).
- Genres: Jazz, Christmas
- Length: 45:13
- Label: Columbia
- Producers: Bobby Colomby, Richard Marx

Chris Botti chronology
Night Sessions (2001)	December (2002)	A Thousand Kisses Deep (2003)

Professional ratings
Review scores
Source	Rating
Allmusic	3/5 stars

December is the fifth studio album by trumpet player Chris Botti. It was released by Columbia Records on October 22, 2002. Botti himself provided vocal on "Perfect Day". In 2006, the album was reissued omitting “Perfect Day” and “Hark the Herald Angels Sing”, re-recording “Have Yourself A Merry Little Christmas" and "Silent Night” as well as adding in "Ave Maria," featuring the Orchestra of St. John's Choir, and "I Don't Really Want Much For Christmas" (featuring Eric Benet).

== Track listing ==
No.	Title	Writer(s)	Length
1.	"The Christmas Song"	Mel Tormé, Robert Wells	4:32
2.	"The First Noel"	Traditional	2:50
3.	"Let It Snow! Let It Snow! Let It Snow!"	Sammy Cahn, Jule Styne	4:02
4.	"Hallelujah"	Leonard Cohen	3:04
5.	"Perfect Day"	Richard Marx, Cynthia Rhodes Marx	2:43
6.	"Santa Claus Is Coming to Town"	J. Fred Coots, Haven Gillespie	4:09
7.	"O Little Town of Bethlehem"	Traditional	3:10
8.	"Winter Wonderland"	Felix Bernard, Richard B. Smith	3:08
9.	"The Little Drummer Boy"	Katherine K. Davis, Henry Onorati, Harry Simeone	3:05
10.	"Hark! The Herald Angels Sing"	Traditional	2:01
11.	"Have Yourself a Merry Little Christmas"	Ralph Blane, Hugh Martin	3:16
12.	"Silent Night"	Traditional	4:59
13.	"I'll Be Home for Christmas"	Kim Gannon, Walter Kent, Buck Ram	4:07

== Personnel ==
- Chris Botti – trumpet, arrangements (1, 3–5, 9, 11–13), string arrangements (1)
- Billy Childs – Fender Rhodes (1, 11, 13), acoustic piano (3, 4, 5, 9, 12), arrangements (4, 5, 12)
- C. J. Vanston – acoustic piano (3, 13), synthesizers (4, 5, 11, 12), organ (3), string arrangements (4), Hammond organ (9)
- Randy Waldman – acoustic piano (7, 8)
- Anthony Wilson – guitar (1, 3, 7, 9)
- Shane Fontayne – guitar (6, 11, 13), arrangements (6)
- James Harrah – guitar (8)
- Dave Carpenter – bass (1, 3, 5, 12)
- Jon Ossman – bass (6, 11, 13)
- Christian McBride – bass (7)
- Brian Bromberg – bass (8)
- Jimmy Haslip – bass (9)
- Peter Erskine – drums (1, 5, 9, 12), percussion (5, 9)
- Vinnie Colaiuta – drums (7, 8, 11, 13)
- Bob Sheppard – alto flute (1), tenor saxophone (9)
- Brandon Fields – tenor saxophone (11)
- Mary Anne Steinberger – cello (1, 4)
- Andrew Picken – viola (1, 4)
- Susan Chatman – violin (1, 4)
- Joel Derouin – violin (1, 4)
- Gina Kronstadt – violin (1, 4), concertmaster (1, 4)
- John Wittenberg – violin (1, 4)
- The London Session Orchestra – orchestra (2, 10)
- Jeremy Lubbock – arrangements (2, 7, 10)
- Gil Goldstein – arrangements (8)
- JoAnn Tominaga – contractor (8)
- Richard H. Bullock – bassoon (8)
- Andrew Radford – bassoon (8)
- Don Markese – clarinet (8)
- Steve Kujala – flute (8)
- Dick Mitchell – flute (8)
- Robert Shulgold – flute (8)
- Justin Hagerman – flugelhorn (8)
- Yvonne Moriarty – flugelhorn (8)
- Brian O'Connor – flugelhorn (8)
- Kurt Snyder – flugelhorn (8)
- Nick Lane – trombone (8)
- John Van Houten – tuba (8)
- Orchestra of St John's – choir (2)
- John Lubbock – choir conductor (2)
- Eric Benét – vocals (7)

=== Production ===
- Bobby Colomby – producer, management
- Nathaniel Kunkel – engineer, mixing (1, 3, 5, 6, 9, 11–13)
- Christopher Roberts – additional engineer
- Joe Brown Jr. – second engineer
- Charlie Paakkari – second engineer
- Haydn Bendell – recording (2, 10), mixing (2, 10)
- Al Schmitt – recording (7, 8), mixing (7, 8)
- Steve Hall – mastering at Future Disc (North Hollywood, California).
- Mary Maurer – art direction
- Kevo Sassouni – design
- Davis Factor – photography
- Marc Silag – management

== Charts ==
Chart (2002)	Peak position
US Top Contemporary Jazz Albums	7
