= Heart & Soul (Joe Cocker album) =

Studio album by Joe Cocker
- Released: 12 October 2004
- Recorded: 2004
- Studio: Capitol Studios (Hollywood, California); The Treehouse (North Hollywood, California); Royaltone Studios (Burbank, California); Mix This! (Pacific Palisades, California); Tidalwave Recording Studio (Karlsdorf, Germany)
- Genre: Rock
- Length: 50:36
- Label: EMI, Parlophone
- Producer: C.J. Vanston

Joe Cocker chronology
Ultimate Collection (2004)	Heart & Soul (2004)	Gold (2006)

Alternative cover

Professional ratings
Review scores
Source	Rating
AllMusic	3.5/5 stars

Heart & Soul is the nineteenth studio album by English singer Joe Cocker, released in the UK on 12 October 2004, and in the US on 1 February 2005. The album is composed solely of cover songs, including a live version of the U2 song "One" taken from Cocker's 2004 Night of the Proms performance in Antwerp, Belgium.

The album reached No. 61 on the Billboard 200.

== Track listing ==
No.	Title	Writer(s)	Original artist(s)	Length
1.	"What's Going On"	Renaldo Benson; Al Cleveland; Marvin Gaye	Marvin Gaye	5:12
2.	"Chain of Fools"	Don Covay	Aretha Franklin	3:45
3.	"One"	U2	U2	4:33
4.	"I Who Have Nothing"	Carlo Donida Labati; Julio Rapetti; Jerry Leiber; Mike Stoller	Joe Sentieri	4:00
5.	"Maybe I'm Amazed"	Paul McCartney	Paul McCartney	3:23
6.	"I Keep Forgetting"	Jerry Leiber; Mike Stoller; Gilbert Garfiled	Chuck Jackson	3:33
7.	"I Put a Spell on You"	Screamin' Jay Hawkins; Herb Slotkin	Screamin' Jay Hawkins	4:31
8.	"Every Kind of People"	Andy Fraser	Robert Palmer	4:19
9.	"Love Don't Live Here Anymore"	Miles Gregory	Rose Royce	4:14
10.	"Don't Let Me Be Lonely"	James Taylor	James Taylor	3:40
11.	"Jealous Guy"	John Lennon	John Lennon	4:06
12.	"Everybody Hurts"	Bill Berry; Peter Buck; Mike Mills; Michael Stipe	R.E.M.	5:20

== Personnel ==
- Joe Cocker – vocals
- C.J. Vanston – track programming (1, 3), keyboards (2, 4–6, 8, 9, 11), bass (2, 5, 9), all instruments (10, 12)
- Shane Fontayne – guitars (1, 5, 7–9)
- Steve Lukather – guitar solo (1, 5, 12)
- Jeff Baxter – guitar solo (2)
- Michael Landau – left guitar (2, 4, 6, 11), guitars (5, 7)
- Dean Parks – right guitar (2, 4, 6, 11), guitars (5), nylon guitar (7)
- Michael Thompson – guitars (3)
- Jeff Beck – guitar solo (4)
- Eric Clapton – guitar solo (7)
- Gene Black – guitars (8)
- Bruce Gaitsch – acoustic guitar (8)
- Leland Sklar – bass (4, 6, 11)
- Ray Neapolitan – bass (7, 8)
- Ray Brinker – drums (2, 4–7, 11)
- Vinnie Colaiuta – drums (8, 9)
- Rafael Padilla – percussion (1–5, 7, 11)
- Chris Botti – trumpet (9)
- Jerry Goodman – violin solo (3)
- Alexander Adhami – santoor (8)
- Shelly Berg – orchestra conductor
- Danielle Ondarza – orchestra contractor
- Bernie Barlow – backing vocals (1)
- Terry Dexter – backing vocals (2)
- C.C. White – backing vocals (2)
- Horn section on "Chain of Fools", "I Who Have Nothing" and "I Keep Forgetting":
  - Bill Churchville and Chris Tedesco – trumpets
  - Nick Lane – trombone
  - Bruce Eskovitz – saxophones

== Production ==
- Joe Cocker – executive producer
- Roger Davies – executive producer, management
- Ray Neapolitan – executive producer, management
- C.J. Vanston – producer, engineer, mixing (2, 6, 9–12)
- Marc DeSisto – engineer
- Greg Ladanyi – engineer, mixing (2, 6, 9–12)
- Bob Clearmountain – mixing (1, 3–5, 7, 8)
- Kevin Harp – assistant engineer, Pro Tools engineer
- James Hoyson – assistant engineer
- Bruce Monical – assistant engineer
- Chris Wonzer – assistant engineer
- Sixtus Oechsle – sound editing
- Dave Carlock – Pro Tools engineer
- Robert Hadley – mastering
- Doug Sax – mastering
- The Mastering Lab (Ojai, California) – mastering location
- Tom Halm – production coordinator, music copyist
- Joanne Jaworowski – project management
- Jeri Heiden – art direction
- Ryan Corey – design
- Kevin Westenberg – photography
- Christopher Wray-McCann – photography
- Camilla De Crespingy – management
- Irene Taylor – management

== Charts ==
Weekly chart performance for Heart & Soul
Chart (2004–05)	Peak position
Australian Albums (ARIA Charts)	65
Austrian Albums (Ö3 Austria)	23
Belgian Albums (Ultratop Flanders)	20
Belgian Albums (Ultratop Wallonia)	22
Dutch Albums (Album Top 100)	39
French Albums (SNEP)	20
German Albums (Offizielle Top 100)	14
Italian Albums (FIMI)	26
New Zealand Albums (RMNZ)	32
Swiss Albums (Schweizer Hitparade)	17
US Billboard 200	61
