= To Love Again: The Duets =

Studio album by Chris Botti
- Released: October 18, 2005
- Genre: Jazz
- Length: 59:43
- Label: Columbia
- Producer: Bobby Colomby

Chris Botti chronology
When I Fall in Love (2004)	To Love Again: The Duets (2005)	Italia (2007)

Professional ratings
Review scores
Source	Rating
AllMusic	4.5/5 stars

To Love Again: The Duets is the eighth studio album by Chris Botti, released on October 18, 2005. It consists of cover versions of pop and jazz standards, except for the title track "To Love Again".

== Track listing ==
No.	Title	Writer(s)	Length
1.	"Embraceable You"	George/Ira Gershwin	4:25
2.	"What Are You Doing the Rest of Your Life?" (featuring Sting)	Alan Bergman, Marilyn Bergman, Michel Legrand	5:05
3.	"My One and Only Love" (featuring Paula Cole)	Guy Wood, Robert Mellin	5:41
4.	"Let There Be Love" (featuring Michael Bublé)	Lionel Rand, Ian Grant	3:12
5.	"What's New?"	Bob Haggart, Johnny Burke	3:59
6.	"Good Morning Heartache" (featuring Jill Scott)	Irene Higginbotham, Ervin Drake, Dan Fisher	6:13
7.	"To Love Again"	Chris Botti, Federico Peña	4:38
8.	"Are You Lonesome Tonight?" (featuring Paul Buchanan)	Lou Handman, Roy Turk	4:01
9.	"Lover Man" (featuring Gladys Knight)	Jimmy Davis, Ram Ramirez, James Sherman	4:50
10.	"I'll Be Seeing You" (featuring Billy Childs)	Sammy Fain, Irving Kahal	4:18
11.	"Pennies from Heaven" (featuring Renee Olstead)	Arthur Johnston, Burke	3:46
12.	"Here's That Rainy Day" (featuring Rosa Passos)	Jimmy Van Heusen, Burke	5:07
13.	"Smile" (featuring Steven Tyler)	Charlie Chaplin, John Turner, Geoffrey Parsons	4:22
Total length:			59:43

== Personnel ==
- Chris Botti – trumpet
- Billy Childs – acoustic piano (1, 3–13), Fender Rhodes (2), arrangements (2, 9, 10, 11), conductor
- Greg Phillinganes – Fender Rhodes (6), arrangements (6)
- Richard Cottle – Hammond organ (9)
- Heitor Pereira – guitar (2), arrangements (2)
- Anthony Wilson – guitar (3, 4, 6–12)
- Arnie Somogyi – bass (1, 5, 13)
- Christian McBride – bass (2, 4, 8, 11)
- Robert Hurst – bass (3, 6, 7, 9, 10, 12)
- Brian Bromberg – bass (13)
- Billy Kilson – drums (1, 3, 5–7, 10, 12, 13)
- Vinnie Colaiuta – drums (2, 4, 8, 11)
- Peter Erskine – drums (9)
- Paulinho da Costa – percussion (2)
- Jeremy Lubbock – arrangements (1, 3, 5, 13), conductor
- Gil Goldstein – arrangements (2, 4, 6, 7, 8, 12), conductor
- Isobel Griffiths – orchestra contractor
- The London Session Orchestra 2005 – orchestra
- Sting – vocals (2)
- Paula Cole – vocals (3)
- Michael Bublé – vocals (4)
- Jill Scott – vocals (6)
- Paul Buchanan – vocals (8)
- Gladys Knight – vocals (9)
- Renee Olstead – vocals (11)
- Rosa Passos – vocals (12)
- Steven Tyler – vocals (13)

=== Production ===
- Producer – Bobby Colomby
- Engineers – Hadyn Bendell, Irecyr Franco, Steve Genewick, Jake Jackson, Kevin Killen, Pablo Munguia, Paul Santo and Al Schmitt.
- Recorded at Capitol Studios (Hollywood, CA); Lamirada Studios (Las Vegas, NV); The Studio (Philadelphia, PA); Pandora's Box (Hanover, MA): Studio 57 (Brasilia, DF); The Warehouse Studio (Vancouver, BC); Air Lyndhurst (London, UK).
- Mixed by Al Schmitt
- Additional Pro Tools Editing – Andy Snitzer
- Mastered by Robert Hadley and Doug Sax at The Mastering Lab (Hollywood, California).
- Creative Consultant – Jeff Ayeroff
- Art Direction and Design – Mary Maurer
- Design Assistant – Michael Lau-Robles
- Photography – Fabrizio Ferri

== Charts ==
Chart performance
Chart (2005–2006)	Peak position
Canadian Albums (Nielsen SoundScan)	54
Italian Albums (FIMI)	99
Polish Albums (ZPAV)	14
UK Jazz & Blues Albums (Official Charts)	28
US Billboard 200	18
US Top Jazz Albums (Billboard)	1

== Certifications ==
Certifications
Region	Certification	Certified units/sales
United States (RIAA)	Gold	500,000^{^}
^{^} Shipments figures based on certification alone.
