= Caruso (song) =

1986 song by Lucio Dalla

"Caruso" is a song written by Italian singer-songwriter Lucio Dalla in 1986. It is dedicated to Enrico Caruso, an Italian tenor. Following Lucio Dalla's death, the song entered the Italian Singles Chart, peaking at number two for two consecutive weeks. The single was also certified platinum by the Federation of the Italian Music Industry.

== Meaning of the song ==
The song tells about the pain and longings of a man who is about to die while he is looking into the eyes of a girl who was very dear to him. The lyrics contain various subtle references to people and places in Caruso's life.

Lucio Dalla told the origin and the meaning of the song in an interview to one of the main Italian newspapers, the Corriere della Sera. He stopped by the coastal town of Sorrento and stayed in the Excelsior Vittoria Hotel, coincidentally in the very same room where many years earlier the tenor Enrico Caruso spent some time shortly before dying. Dalla was inspired to write the song after the owners told him about the last days of Caruso and in particular the latter's passion for one of his young female students.

Caruso was an acclaimed Italian operatic singer who was sought after during the late 19th and early 20th centuries. Unfortunately he lived a very difficult and rather unhappy life, having had many challenges and problems with Italian opera houses, but gained more fame and success in the United States.

Caruso was born to a poor family in Naples. He was often involved with women, and had several love affairs with prominent married women in the performing arts, which often ended badly. His longest and most passionate love affair was with the married Ada Giachetti, with whom he had two sons. It ended when she left him for their chauffeur. A few years before he died, he met and wed a woman 20 years his junior, Dorothy Park Benjamin, whom Lucio Dalla describes in this song "Caruso". With her he had a daughter named Gloria.

Guardò negli occhi la ragazza, quegli occhi verdi come il mare
He looked into the eyes of the girl, those eyes as green as the sea
Poi all'improvviso uscì una lacrima e lui credette di affogare
But then, a tear fell, and he thought he was drowning

Sorrento is referred to as "Surriento", which is the name in the Neapolitan language. It refers to Caruso's frequent visits to the seaside town and its Excelsior Vittoria Hotel.

Te voglio bene assaje
I love you very much
ma tanto tanto bene sai
very, very much, you know
è una catena ormai
It is a chain by now
che scioglie il sangue dint'e vene sai...
that melts the blood inside of our veins, you know ...

Here the "chain" is a translation, but what is meant is a chain reaction – such love melts the blood and so forth. The music and words of the above refrain, written in a mixture of standard Italian and Neapolitan, are based on a Neapolitan song, titled "Dicitencello vuje", published in 1930 by Rodolfo Falvo (music) and Enzo Fusco (text) written according to the best tradition of Neapolitan "romances" with a style reminiscent of opera.

Lucio Dalla's official video of the song was filmed in the 'Caruso Suite' at the Excelsior Vittoria Hotel where Caruso spent most of the final weeks of his life, though Caruso died at the Vesuvio Hotel in Naples.

In 2015, on the occasion of the third anniversary of Dalla's passing, GoldenGate Edizioni published the biographical novel by Raffaele Lauro, "Caruso The Song – Lucio Dalla and Sorrento", which through unpublished testimonies reconstructs the almost fifty-year-long bond (from 1964 to 2012) of the great artist with Sorrento ("Sorrento is the true corner of my soul"), and the authentic inspiration for his masterpiece, "Caruso". The documentary film by the same author, "Lucio Dalla and Sorrento – Places of the Soul", was presented in the national première on 7 August 2015 at the Social World Film Festival 2015 in Vico Equense.

== Cover versions ==
- Luciano Pavarotti covered the song in 1989 to his album Tutto Pavarotti.
- Florent Pagny covered the song in 1996. Released as a single, his version peaked at No. 2 in France and No. 3 in Belgium (Wallonia).
- Ana Belén covered the song in a duet with Dalla on her album Mírame (1997).
- Lara Fabian covered the song in 2003 to her En Toute Intimité
- Trumpeter Chris Botti covered the song from 2007 album Italia.
- Greek singer Giannis Poulopoulos covered the song with Greek lyrics.

== Charts ==
=== Weekly charts ===
Weekly chart performance for "Caruso"
Chart (1990–2015)	Peak position
Austria (Ö3 Austria Top 40)	43
France (SNEP)	38
Germany (GfK)	61
Italy (FIMI)	2
Netherlands (Single Top 100)	68
Spain (Promusicae)	30
Switzerland (Schweizer Hitparade)	16

=== Year-end charts ===
2012 year-end chart performance for "Caruso"
Chart (2012)	Rank
Italy (FIMI)	71
