= Change (Chick Corea album) =

Studio album by Chick Corea & Origin
- Released: May 21, 1999 (Japan); June 8, 1999 (USA)
- Genre: Jazz
- Length: 69:46
- Label: Stretch
- Producers: Chick Corea, Ron Moss

Chick Corea chronology
A Week at The Blue Note (1998)	Change (1999)	corea.concerto (1999)

Professional ratings
Review scores
Source	Rating
Allmusic	4/5 stars
All About Jazz	(not rated)
Entertainment Weekly	(B)
The Penguin Guide to Jazz Recordings	3.5/4 stars

Change is the first studio recording of the acoustic jazz sextet Origin featuring Chick Corea on piano. The sextet is unchanged except for Jeff Ballard replacing Adam Cruz on drums. The album was released on Rykodisc on June 8, 1999.

== Track listing ==
1. "Wigwam" (Corea) – 6:56
2. "Armando's Tango" – 5:54
3. "Little Flamenco" – 6:42
4. "Early Afternoon Blues" – 6:37
5. "Before Your Eyes" – 5:08
6. "L.A. Scenes" – 5:36
7. "Home" – 7:51
8. "The Spinner" – 7:56
9. "Compassion [Ballad]" – 7:47
10. "Night (Lyla)" (Cohen) – 3:02
11. "Awakening" – 6:17

== Personnel ==
Musicians

- Chick Corea – piano, marimba, handclapping
- Avishai Cohen – double bass
- Jeff Ballard – drums, handclapping
- Bob Sheppard – bass clarinet, flute, baritone saxophone, soprano saxophone, tenor saxophone
- Steve Wilson – clarinet, flute, alto saxophone, soprano saxophone
- Steve Davis – trombone

Production

- Bob Cetti – assistant engineer
- Chick Corea – producer, executive producer, mixing
- Lourdes Delgado – photography
- Bernie Kirsh – engineer, mixing
- Tom Legoff – photography
- Karen Miller – photography
- Ron Moss – producer, executive producer
- Eric Seijo – assistant engineer
- Darren Wong – design
- Alan Yoshida – mastering

== Chart performance ==
Year	Chart	Position
1999	Billboard Top Jazz Albums	19
