= Impressions (Chris Botti album) =

Studio album by Chris Botti
- Released: April 17, 2012
- Genre: Jazz
- Length: 62:59
- Label: Columbia
- Producer: Bobby Colomby: Walter Afanasieff; Mark Knopfler

Chris Botti chronology
Live in Boston (2009)	Impressions (2012)

Professional ratings
Review scores
Source	Rating
Allmusic	3.5/5 stars

Impressions is the tenth studio album by American jazz trumpeter Chris Botti, which was released on April 17, 2012, through Columbia Records. The album debuted and peaked No. 1 on the Billboard Jazz Album chart. On February 10, 2013, the album received the Grammy Award for Best Pop Instrumental Album.

== Track listing ==
No.	Title	Writer(s)	Length
1.	"Prelude No. 20 in C Minor"	Frédéric Chopin	4:55
2.	"Per Te (For You)" (featuring Andrea Bocelli)	Chris Botti, David Foster, Tiziano Ferro	4:25
3.	"En Aranjuez Con Tu Amor"	Joaquín Rodrigo	5:27
4.	"You Are Not Alone"	R. Kelly	3:23
5.	"Losing You" (featuring Vince Gill)	Randy Newman	6:11
6.	"Tango Suite" (featuring Herbie Hancock)	Botti, Hancock	6:38
7.	"Setembro"	Ivan Lins	3:04
8.	"Oblivion" (featuring Caroline Campbell)	Ástor Piazzolla	4:23
9.	"Sevdah"	Gabriel Yared, Tanja Tzarovska	5:47
10.	"Summertime" (featuring David Foster)	George Gershwin, DuBose Heyward	3:42
11.	"Contigo En La Distancia"	César Portillo de la Luz	4:07
12.	"Over the Rainbow"	Harold Arlen, E.Y. Harburg	3:21
13.	"What a Wonderful World" (featuring Mark Knopfler)	George David Weiss, Bob Thiele	7:34

== Personnel ==
- Chris Botti – trumpet, arrangements (10)
- Billy Childs – acoustic piano (1, 7)
- Jim Cox – acoustic piano (2, 13), arrangements (13)
- David Foster – arrangements (2, 10, 11), acoustic piano (10), keyboards (11)
- John Barlow Jarvis – acoustic piano (5)
- Herbie Hancock – acoustic piano (6)
- Walter Afanasieff – keyboards (7, 9), arrangements (9), choir vocals (9)
- Geoffrey Keezer – acoustic piano (8)
- Guy Fletcher – Fender Rhodes (13)
- Leonardo Amuedo – guitar (2, 3, 5, 7, 8, 12)
- Ramón Stagnaro – guitar (11)
- Mark Knopfler – electric guitar (13), vocals (13)
- Richard Bennett – acoustic guitar (13)
- Robert Hurst – bass (1, 6, 7, 11)
- David Hungate – bass (5)
- Michael Valerio – bass (8)
- Glenn Worf – bass (13)
- Vinnie Colaiuta – drums (1, 5–7, 11)
- Ian Thomas – drums (13)
- Alex Acuña – percussion (3, 9, 11)
- Pedro Eustache – duduk (9)
- Caroline Campbell – orchestra contractor (1, 2, 5, 6, 8, 11, 12), violin (8)
- Isobel Griffiths – orchestra contractor (3, 7, 9, 13)
- Vince Mendoza – arrangements and conductor (1, 6)
- William Ross – arrangements and conductor (2, 5, 8, 11, 12), arrangements (9)
- Gil Goldstein – arrangements (3, 13)
- Jaques Morelenbaum – orchestra conductor (3, 13), arrangements and conductor (7)
- Ben Foster – orchestra conductor (9)
- Andrea Bocelli – vocals (2)
- Vince Gill – vocals (5)
- Lisa Fischer – choir vocals (9)
- Tanja Tzarovska – vocals (9)
- Bill Linnane - piano (13)

=== Production ===
- Bobby Colomby – producer (1–8, 10–12), management
- Walter Afanasieff – producer (9)
- Mark Knopfler – producer (13)
- Allen Sides – mixing, engineer (1–12), recording (1, 4, 6, 10), instrumental recording (2, 3, 5, 7–9, 11, 12), orchestra recording (2, 5, 8, 11, 12)
- Jorge Vivo – vocal recording (2)
- Haydn Bendall – orchestra recording (3, 7, 9, 13), vocal recording (9)
- Drew Bollman – instrumental recording (5), vocal recording (5)
- Matt Rausch – instrumental recording (5), vocal recording (5)
- Tyler Gordon – keyboard recording (7, 9), choir vocal recording (9)
- Chuck Ainlay – engineer (13), recording (13)
- Joe Kearnes – second engineer (13)
- Scott Moore – Pro Tools operator (1–9, 11, 12)
- Tim Lauber – Pro Tools operator (2, 5, 8, 10–12)
- Jochem van der Saag – Pro Tools operator (2), instrumental recording (11)
- Fiona Cruikshank – Pro Tools operator (3, 7, 9, 13)
- Eric Boulanger – mastering
- Doug Sax – mastering
- Matt Evers – production coordinator
- Fabrizio Ferri – photography
- Archie Castillo – management

Studios

- Recorded at Ocean Way Recording and Newman Scoring Stage (Hollywood, CA); Chartmaker Studios (Malibu, CA); Record One (Los Angeles, CA); The House (New Canaan, CT); British Grove and AIR Lyndhurst Hall (London, UK).
- Mixed at Ocean Way Recording.
- Mastered at The Mastering Lab (Ojai, CA).

== Charts ==
Chart performance for Impressions
Chart (2012)	Peak position
Canadian Albums (Nielsen SoundScan)	62
Polish Albums (ZPAV)	8
US Billboard 200	32
US Top Jazz Albums (Billboard)	1
