= A Thousand Kisses Deep (album) =

Studio album by Chris Botti
- Released: September 13, 2003
- Genre: Jazz
- Length: 45:43
- Label: Columbia
- Producer: Steve Lindsey

Chris Botti chronology
December (2002)	A Thousand Kisses Deep (2003)	When I Fall in Love (2004)

Professional ratings
Review scores
Source	Rating
Allmusic	3/5 stars

A Thousand Kisses Deep is the sixth studio album by trumpet player Chris Botti. It was released by Columbia Records on September 13, 2003. Guest vocalists include Chantal Kreviazuk on "The Look of Love" and Bridget Benenate on "Ever Since We Met". The album title comes from the name of the fourth track, "A Thousand Kisses Deep", a cover of the 2001 Leonard Cohen track.

== Track listing ==
No.	Title	Writer(s)	Length
1.	"Indian Summer"	Mark Goldenberg	3:37
2.	"Do It in Luxury"	Chris Botti, Sharon Robinson, Keefus Ciancia	3:43
3.	"The Look of Love" (feat. Chantal Kreviazuk)	Burt Bacharach, Hal David	5:17
4.	"A Thousand Kisses Deep"	Leonard Cohen, Sharon Robinson	4:00
5.	"Ever Since We Met" (feat. Bridget Benenate)	Botti, Matthew Gerrard, Bridget Benenate	5:09
6.	"Back Into My Heart"	Botti, Gerrard, Benenate	4:14
7.	"My Funny Valentine"	Richard Rodgers, Lorenz Hart	3:11
8.	"The Last Three Minutes"	Bacharach, Andre Young	3:32
9.	"If I Could"	Botti, Robinson	4:34
10.	"She Comes from Somewhere"	Botti, Ciancia, Benji Hughes, Steve Lindsey	5:08
11.	"Love Gets Old"	Hughes, Holly Palmer	3:18
12.	"1984 (Japan Bonus Track)"	Botti	4:50

== Personnel ==
- Chris Botti – trumpet
- Keefus Ciancia – keyboards (1, 3–6, 8–10), Moog Voyager bass (1, 2, 8), acoustic piano (10), synth bass (10)
- Mark Goldenberg – keyboards (1), drum programming (1)
- Steve Lindsey – acoustic piano (1, 3, 5, 11), keyboards (1, 3, 5, 6, 9, 10), Wurlitzer electric piano (2), shaker (9)
- Printz Board – synthesizers (2), drum programming (2, 3, 5, 10)
- Jim Cox – keyboards (3, 8), Fender Rhodes (8)
- Matthew Gerrard – keyboards (5, 6), bass (5), drum programming (5, 6), synthesizers (6), electric guitars (6)
- Billy Childs – acoustic piano (7)
- Dean Parks – guitars (2, 4, 5, 10), acoustic guitars (3, 6, 9)
- Smokey Hormel – electric guitars (3, 9)
- Doyle Bramhall – guitars (8)
- Mike Elizondo – bass (3, 9)
- Chuck Berghofer – bass (4), additional acoustic guitar (5)
- Joey Waronker – additional drums (2), drums (4, 9)
- Abe Laboriel, Jr. – hi-hat (2, 10), additional drums (6)
- Lenny Castro – percussion (5, 6), bongos (8)
- Bob Sheppard – tenor saxophone (2)
- Mort Lindsey – string arrangements and conductor (3)
- Chantal Kreviazuk – vocals (3)
- Bridget Benenate – vocals (5)

=== Production ===
- Steve Lindsey – producer
- Joe Chiccarelli – engineer
- David Ashton – assistant engineer, additional recording
- Matthew Gerrard – additional recording
- Gabe Veltri – additional recording
- Dave Way – mixing
- Lior Goldenberg – mix assistant
- Robert Hadley – mastering
- Doug Sax – mastering
- Jolie Levine – production coordinator
- Mary Maurer – art direction, design
- Fabrizio Ferri – photography
- Marc Silag – management

Studios

- Mixed at Scream Studios (Studio City, California).
- Mastered at The Mastering Lab (Hollywood, California).

== Charts ==
Chart (2003)	Peak position
US Top Jazz Albums	4
