= Renee Olstead =

American actress and singer (born 1989)

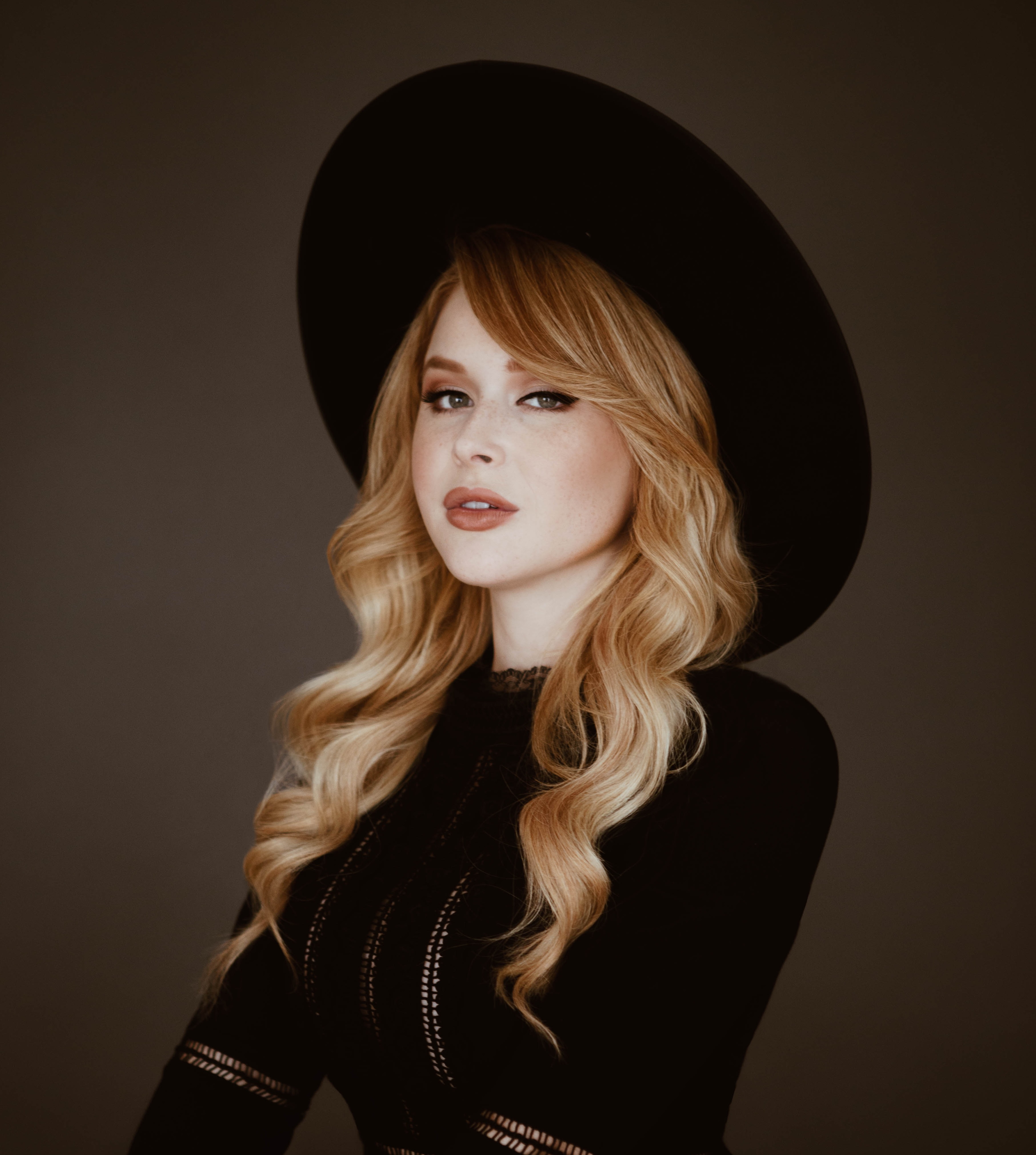
- Olstead in 2017
- Born: Rebecca Renee Olstead; June 18, 1989 (age 37); Houston, Texas, U.S.
- Occupations: Actress, singer, marriage and family therapist, sex therapist
- Years active: 1995–present
- Spouse: Tommy King (m. 2014; div. 2020) Timothy Faust (m. 2024)
- Musical career
- Genres: Jazz, country
- Instrument: Vocals
- Labels: Renee, 143, Reprise, Warner Bros. Records
- Website: xorenee.com

Rebecca Renee Olstead (born June 18, 1989) is an American actress, singer, and marriage and family therapist. Active since childhood as an actress, she is best known for her roles on the CBS sitcom Still Standing and on the ABC Family drama The Secret Life of the American Teenager as Madison Cooperstein. In addition, she has recorded four studio albums, primarily of jazz music.

== Early life ==
Olstead was born in Kingwood, Texas, to Christopher Eric Olstead and Rebecca Lynn Jeffries. Olstead is of Norwegian ancestry. She also attended Centre Stage theatrical school and is mentioned on their website's list of alumni.

== Career ==
As a child actress, she made films and commercials from age eight onwards. From 2002 to 2006, she appeared in the TV sitcom Still Standing as middle sister Lauren Miller. Olstead was presented with the Young Artist Award for Best Performance in a TV Series (Comedy) - Supporting Young Actress for Still Standing in 2002. She also had a small part in the 2004 film 13 Going on 30. She co-starred in the ABC Family series The Secret Life of the American Teenager, about fifteen-year-old Amy Juergens's struggle through her unexpected pregnancy and how it affected her peers. Olstead played the character Madison Cooperstein, one of Amy's best friends.

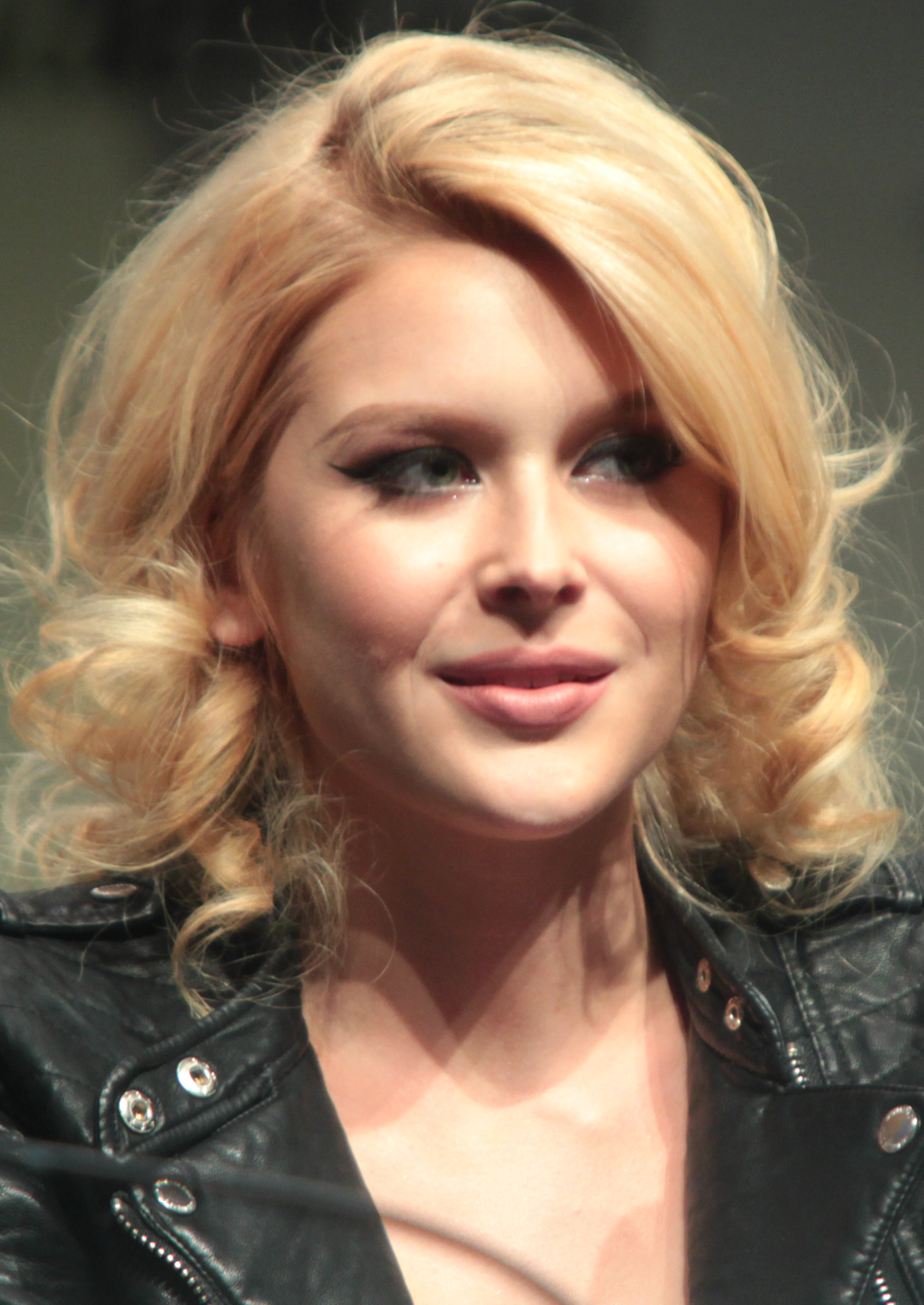
Olstead promoting Unfriended at Comic-Con in 2015

In 2004, Olstead released a self-titled album of jazz songs and pop standards for Warner Bros. Records to good reviews. Since her previous releases had limited distribution, this album was considered her official debut. She subsequently performed in Berlin during the Live 8 concert on July 2, 2005. Olstead also recorded with trumpeter Chris Botti on his 2005 album To Love Again: The Duets and appeared on the 2006 DVD Chris Botti Live with Orchestra and Special Guests. Her singing style is influenced by jazz vocalists Ella Fitzgerald and Sarah Vaughan. Reportedly, her musical talent was discovered by composer David Foster, who produced her 2004 album. She later performed with him on The Oprah Winfrey Show.

A follow-up album entitled Skylark, also produced by Foster, was originally announced for release in 2005, but it was subsequently pushed back several times, with release dates in the summer of 2006 and early 2007 being mentioned on online retailers such as Amazon.com. It was then scheduled for a June 2008 release, but was delayed once again. It was finally released on January 27, 2009, nearly four years after it was originally announced.

Olstead later starred as Kaitlan in the 2013 supernatural thriller The Midnight Game and as Jess Felton in the 2014 technology-themed thriller film Unfriended.

On November 30, 2020, she announced that she was launching an OnlyFans page. Her introductory subscription fee was set at $9.99 per month. She was the Penthouse Pet of the Month in January 2023 and the 2024 Penthouse Pet of the Year. Since April 12, 2023 she is an associate marriage and family therapist specializing in sex therapy. She is a sex therapist for the adult industry mental health support network Pineapple Support.

== Personal life ==
Olstead married pianist Tommy King in Los Angeles on August 3, 2014 and legally took his last name. The two divorced in 2020. As Renee King, she was crowned Ms. West Coast at the Miss West Coast pageant in 2016.

Olstead is a vegan. She appeared in a PETA ad, Fish Are Friends Not Food, urging her fans to become vegan themselves.

On September 14, 2011, as the result of a criminal complaint initially made by actress Scarlett Johansson, the FBI announced it was investigating the alleged hacking of celebrity cellphone and email accounts and the dissemination of explicit nude photographs of Johansson and approximately 50 other celebrities, including Olstead. As a result of the investigation, 35-year-old Christopher Chaney of Jacksonville, Florida, was arrested in October 2011. During the trial, Olstead testified that she attempted suicide after the nude photographs were leaked, adding that she had never considered suicide before the hacking. Chaney was sentenced to 10 years in prison in December 2012.

In 2024, Olstead married healthcare writer Timothy Faust. In 2025, she received a citation from the Wisconsin State Assembly for her advocacy work. She served as Francesca Hong's deputy campaign manager in her 2026 campaign for governor of Wisconsin.

== Discography ==
=== List of studio albums, with selected chart positions ===
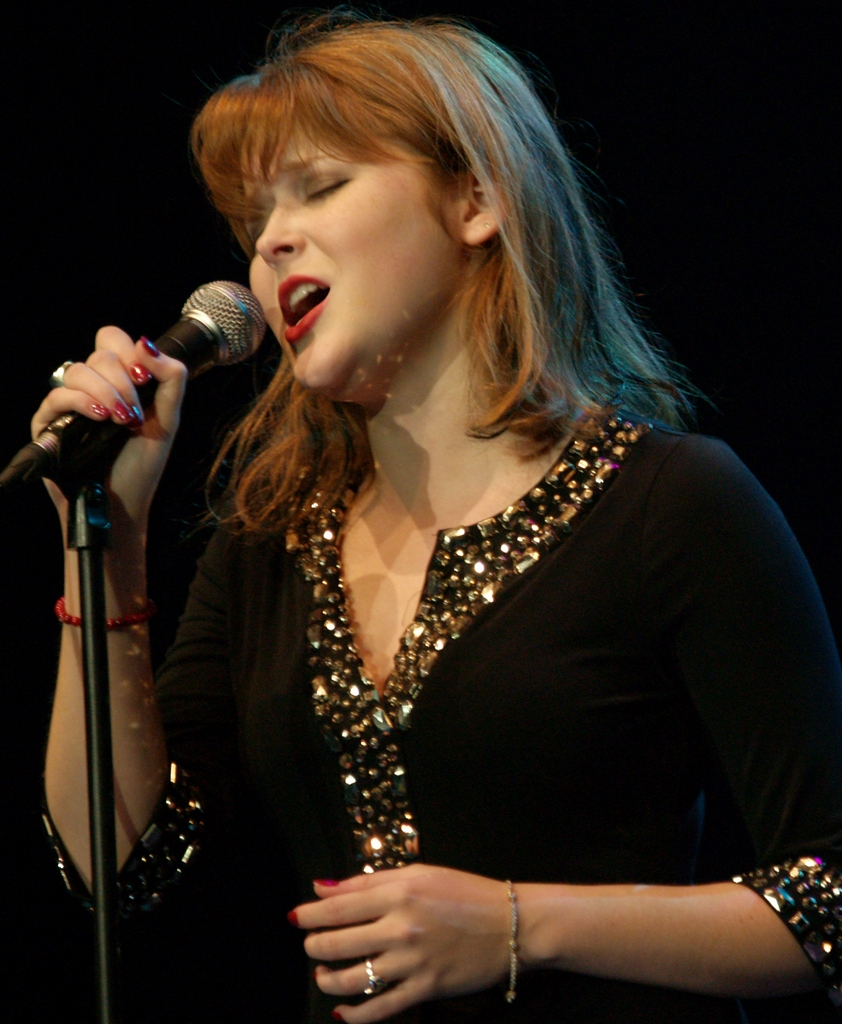
Olstead performing at Java Jazz Festival in 2008

Title	Album details	Peak chart positions		Certifications
Title	Album details	US Country	US	Certifications
Stone Country	Release date: December 5, 2000; Label: Renee; Formats: CD	—	—	
Renee Olstead	Release date: May 25, 2004; Label: 143 Records/Warner Bros. Records; Formats: CD	—	—	
Skylark	Release date: January 2009; Label: Reprise; Formats: CD	—	—	
Without You [EP]	Release date: November 11, 2014; Label: N/A; Formats: Digital	—	—	
"—" denotes releases that did not chart or were not released to that country

=== Singles ===
Year	Title	Peak chart positions				Certifications	Album
Year	Title	US Country	US	US AC	US Adult	Certifications	Album
2000	"Unleashed"	—	—	—	—		
2004	"What a Wonderful World"	—	—	—	—		Renee Olstead
2004	"Summertime"	—	—	—	—		Skylark
2009	"Midnight Man"	—	—	—	—		Skylark
2012	"She's Got Your Name"	—	—	—	—		
2013	"You're Mine"	—	—	—	—		
2013	"Sleepwalk"	—	—	—	—		
2017	"Help Me Make It Through the Night"	—	—	—	—		
2018	"Trying to Win Your Love"	—	—	—	—		
2018	"I Fall to Pieces"	—	—	—	—		
"—" denotes releases that did not chart or were not released to that country

=== Other charted songs ===
Year	Title	Peak chart position			Album
Year	Title	US	US AC	US Adult	Album
2004	"Breaking Up Is Hard to Do"	—	—	—	Renee Olstead
2004	"Sunday Kind of Love" ft. Chris Botti	—	—	—	Renee Olstead
2004	"Is You Is or Is You Ain't My Baby"	—	—	—	Renee Olstead
2004	"Meet Me, Midnight"	—	—	—	Renee Olstead
2004	"A Love That Will Last"	—	—	—	Renee Olstead
2009	"Lover Man"	—	—	—	Skylark
2009	"Ain't We Got Fun"	—	—	—	Skylark
2009	"You've Changed"	—	—	—	Skylark
2009	"Stars Fell on Alabama"	—	—	—	Skylark
2009	"Nothing But the Blame"	—	—	—	Skylark
2009	"Midnight Man"	—	—	—	Skylark
2009	"Midnight in Austin Texas"	—	—	—	Skylark
2009	"Hold Me Now"	—	—	—	Skylark
2009	"Thanks for the Boogie Ride"	—	—	—	Skylark
?	"Through the Fire"	—	—	—	
"—" denotes releases that did not chart or were not released to that country

== Filmography ==
=== Film ===
Year	Title	Role	Notes
1996	Cadillac Ranch	Mary Katherine (young)	film debut shared role with Renee Humphrey
1997	The Usher	Little Girl	Short film
1999	The Insider	Deborah Wigand	
1999	End of Days	Amy	credited as Rebecca Renee Olstead
2000	Space Cowboys	Little Girl	
2003	Scorched	Girl Scout	
2004	13 Going on 30	Becky	
2012	The Monogamy Experiment	Renee Ramrock	
2013	The Midnight Game	Kaitlan	
2014	Unfriended	Jess Felton	
2014	The Monogamy Experiment Short	unknown	Short film
2015	The Murder Pact	Annabel	
2017	Feral	Brienne	
2018	Bachelor Lions	Evelyn Ross	

=== Television ===
Year	Title	Role	Notes
1995	Streets of Laredo	Marci Fant	television debut Television Miniseries; Episode: #1.3"
1995	Deadly Family Secrets	Emily Pick	Television Movie
1996	Santa, NASA & the Man in the Moon	Herself	Television Movie
1996	Ceftin Wiz Kids	Katie	Television Movie
1997	Out There	Megan Tollman	Television Movie
1998	Touched by an Angel	Bits	Episode: "Doodlebugs"
1998	Reunited	Ami Beck	series regular; 5 episodes
1999	Chicken Soup for the Soul	Lauren	Episode: "Where's My Kiss, Then?"
1999	Providence	Little Girl	Episode: "Home for the Holidays"
2000	The Wonderful World of Disney	Featured	Episode: "Geppetto"
2002	My Guide to Becoming a Rock Star	Selma	Episode: "Fame"
2002	She Spies	Amy Divornak	Episode: "Poster Girl"
2002-2006	Still Standing	Lauren Miller	Main role Young Artist Award for Best Performance in a TV Series (Comedy) Supporting Young Actress (2006); Nominated - Young Artist Award for Best Performance in a TV Series (Comedy or Drama) - Leading Young Actress (2003)
2003	Fillmore!	Lucille (voice role)	Episode: "South of Friendship, North of Honor"
2007	Super Sweet 16: The Movie	Sky Storm	Television Movie
2007	Point of Entry	Melinda	Television Movie
2008-2013	The Secret Life of the American Teenager	Madison Cooperstein	Recurring character
2011	The Bling Ring	April	Television Movie
2016	Grip and Electric	Krystyn	Main Role
2016	Cozmo's	Kallie	Television Movie
TBA	Work Mom	Heather	Television Movie

1970s	Evelyn Treacher	Stephanie McLean	Tina McDowall	Patricia Barrett	Avril Lund
1970s	Anneka Di Lorenzo	Laura Bennett Doone	Victoria Lynn Johnson	Dominique Maure	Cheryl Rixon
1980s	Isabella Ardigo	Danielle Deneux	Corinne Alphen	Sheila Kennedy	Linda Kenton
1980s	None	Cody Carmack	Mindy Farrar	Patty Mullen	Ginger Miller
1990s	Stephanie Page	Simone Brigitte	Jisel	Julie Strain	Sasha Vinni
1990s	Gina LaMarca	Andi Sue Irwin	Elizabeth Ann Hilden	Paige Summers	Nikie St. Gilles
2000s	Juliet Cariaga	Zdeňka Podkapová	Megan Mason	Sunny Leone	Victoria Zdrok
2000s	Martina Warren	Jamie Lynn	Heather Vandeven	Erica Ellyson	Taya Parker
2010s	Taylor Vixen	Nikki Benz	Jenna Rose	Nicole Aniston	Lexi Belle
2010s	Layla Sin	Kenna James	Jenna Sativa	Gina Valentina	Gianna Dior
2020s	Lacy Lennon	Kenzie Anne	Amber Marie	Tahlia Paris	Renee Olstead
2020s	Kassie Wallis	-	-	-	-
