= Michael Thompson (horn player) =

British horn player

- Born: January 4, 1954 (age 72)
- Genres: Classical
- Occupation: Musician
- Instrument: French horn
- Formerly of: BBC Scottish Symphony Orchestra

Michael Thompson (born 4 January 1954) is a British horn player. After studying at the Royal Academy of Music, Thompson was appointed Principal Horn with the BBC Scottish Symphony Orchestra aged just 18 years. By the age of 21, he was offered positions as Principal Horn with both the Philharmonia and Royal Philharmonic Orchestras, accepting the Philharmonia position, a post he held for ten years before leaving to fulfil increasing solo and chamber music commitments.

Thompson is a member of the London Sinfonietta, with whom he has given premiere performances of works including Ligeti's Hamburg Concerto. He has recorded solo, chamber, and orchestral works composed by Britten, Haydn, Messiaen, Strauss, Beethoven, Brahms, Mozart, Schumann, and Tippett, among others. He has played on movie soundtracks including Drowning by Numbers as a member of the Michael Nyman Band, The Lord of the Rings and the Harry Potter films. His work with Sir Paul McCartney led McCartney to compose Stately Horn, which the Michael Thompson Horn Quartet premiered.

Thompson is an advocate of youth music-making and holds the post of Rehearsal Conductor for the Ulster Youth Orchestra.

Thompson has toured extensively and since 2003 he has been Principal Conductor of the City of Rochester Symphony Orchestra.

Thompson is a Fellow and Aubrey Brain Professor of Horn at the Royal Academy of Music.
