= Manhattan Jazz Quintet =

American jazz ensemble

The Manhattan Jazz Quintet is a jazz ensemble consisting of David Matthews on piano, Lew Soloff on trumpet, Victor Lewis on drums, Andy Snitzer on saxophone, and Charnett Moffett on bass. Previously, the band featured George Young on tenor sax, Eddie Gómez on bass, and Steve Gadd on drums.

The group was formed in 1983 at the suggestion of Japanese jazz magazine Swing Journal and the King record label and won the Gold Disk Award of Swing in 1984.

Gadd left in 1987, with Dave Weckl serving as a replacement in 1988 and 1989, but came back for a reunion in 1990, with John Scofield as guest artist on a number of selections. These later recordings were recorded for the Sweet Basil label.

Gomez left the band after the recording of Manteca in 1992 and was replaced by Charnett Moffett. Gadd left the band, with Victor Lewis becoming his permanent replacement in 1993; Young left in 2000 and was replaced by Andy Snitzer. Lew Soloff died on March 8, 2015

Due to the group's albums limited distribution in other countries (albums are only available as imports from Japan), it is not well known outside Japan.

== Discography ==
Album name	Year released	Label	References/notes unless otherwise noted
Manhattan Jazz Quintet	1984	King	
Autumn Leaves	1985	King	
My Funny Valentine	1986	King	
The Sidewinder	1986	King	
Live	1986	ProJazz	
Live At Pit Inn	1986	King	
My Favorite Things: Live In Tokyo	1987	King	
Caravan	1988	King	with Dave Weckl on drums
Face to Face	1988	King	with Dave Weckl on drums
Plays Blue Note	1988	King	with Dave Weckl on drums;
The Best of Manhattan Jazz Quintet	1988	Projazz	(compilation)
Manhattan Blues	1990	Sweet Basil/Peter Pan (?)	with Steve Gadd on drums re-released by Video Arts on November 21, 2001
Funky Strut	1991	Sweet Basil	with Peter Erskine on drums re-released by Video Arts on November 21, 2001
Manteca (live)	1992	Evidence	with Peter Erskine on drums re-released by Video Arts on November 21, 2001
Autumn in New York	1993	Sweet Basil	with Victor Lewis on drums re-released by Video Arts on November 21, 2001
Concierto de Aranjuez	1994	Sweet Basil	with both Gadd & Lewis on drums and both Moffett & Gomez on bass re-released by Video Arts on November 21, 2001
Moritat	1995	Peter Pan	with Victor Lewis on drums (and all albums after this point)
The Original Voice	1995	Sweet Basil	re-released by Video Arts on November 21, 2001
La Fiesta	1997	Sweet Basil	
Air on the G String	1997	Sweet Basil	
'Round Midnight with Terumasa Hino	1998	Sweet Basil	
Teen Town	2000	Video Arts	re-released by Video Arts on March 21, 2007
I Got Rhythm	2001	Video Arts	re-released by Video Arts on March 21, 2007
Take Five: Live at the Symphony Hall with Century Orchestra Osaka	2001	Video Arts	
Blue Bossa	2003	Video Arts	
Take The A Train	2004	Video Arts	re-released by Video Arts on March 21, 2007
Come Together	2005	Video Arts	
Someday My Prince Will Come	2007	Video Arts	
Best of best 2000-2007 selected by Shigeyuki Kawashima	2008	Video Arts	(compilation)
V.S.O.P: Very Special Onetime Performance	2008	King	with Steve Gadd on drums and Eddie Gomez on bass
Best of Best	??	Sweet Basil	(compilation) – includes recordings from 1990, 1992, 1993, and 1994;

Manhattan Jazz Quintet also recorded Good King Wenceslas for the compilation CD Chiaroscuro Christmas.

== Filmography ==
Album name	Year released	Distributor	References/notes
Live at Quatro	??	Music Video Distributors (??)	VHS of 1990 live concert
Live in Tokyo 2005	2006	Video Arts	DVD of live performance; released on May 31, 2006; re-released on September 24, 2008
