= Chris Botti =

American trumpeter and composer (born 1962)

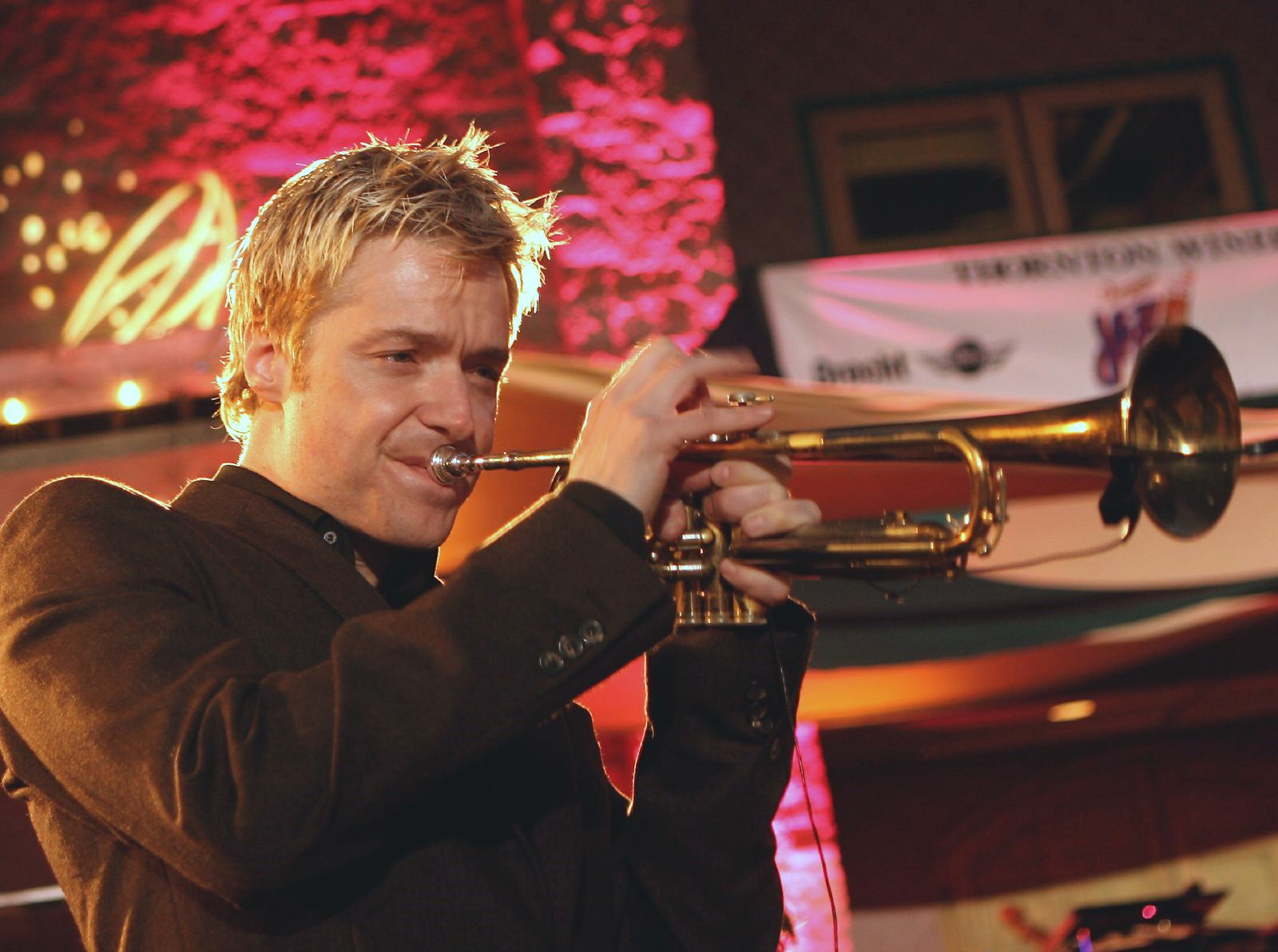
- Botti performing in 2006

Background information
- Born: Christopher Stephen Botti; October 12, 1962 (age 64); Portland, Oregon, U.S.
- Genres: Jazz, smooth jazz, pop
- Occupation: Musician
- Instrument: Trumpet
- Labels: Verve, GRP, Columbia, Universal, Sony
- Website: chrisbotti.com

Christopher Stephen Botti (/ˈboʊti/ BOH-tee; born October 12, 1962) is an American trumpeter and composer.

In 2013, Botti won the Grammy Award in the Best Pop Instrumental Album category, for the album Impressions. He was also nominated in 2008 for his album Italia and received three nominations in 2010 for the live album Chris Botti in Boston. Four of his albums have reached the No. 1 position on the Billboard jazz albums chart.

Coming to prominence with the 2001 recording of his Night Sessions album, Botti established a reputation as a versatile musician in both jazz and pop music for his ability to fuse both styles together.

== Early life ==
Botti was born in Portland, Oregon, and raised in Corvallis, although he also spent two years of his childhood in Italy. His earliest musical influence was his mother, a classically trained pianist and part-time piano teacher. He started playing the trumpet at nine years old, and committed to the instrument at age 12 when he heard Miles Davis play "My Funny Valentine".

In 1981, he was selected as a member of McDonald's All American High School Jazz Band, which marked his first Carnegie Hall performance.

At the age of 17, he ended up at Mount Hood Community College in Gresham, Oregon, by convincing his high school to allow him to fulfill his remaining senior year credits there. Chris set his class schedule so that he could also play at Portland clubs in the evening. Mount Hood's program was headed by Larry McVey, whose band had come to be a proving ground and regular stop for Stan Kenton and Mel Tormé when they were looking for new players. It was here Botti played alongside his friend, trombonist and future Academy Award nominated filmmaker, Todd Field.

After graduating from Crescent Valley High School, Botti studied under jazz educator David Baker and trumpet professor Bill Adam at the Indiana University School of Music.

Botti was also the recipient of two grants from the National Endowment for the Arts which allowed him to study with trumpeter Woody Shaw and saxophonist George Coleman during two consecutive summer breaks.

== Career ==
=== Early career ===
Botti left Indiana University during his senior year for short touring stints with Frank Sinatra and Buddy Rich. In 1985, he moved to New York City to hone his craft as a studio musician.

In 1990, he began a decade long touring and recording relationship with Paul Simon which broadened his exposure to other singers. During that period, he also performed/recorded with Aretha Franklin, Natalie Cole, Bette Midler, Joni Mitchell, Natalie Merchant, Scritti Politti, Roger Daltrey and others.

On August 15, 1991, Botti performed with Paul Simon in New York's Central Park as part of The Rhythm of the Saints tour. The performance was commercially released as the Concert in the Park CD. While on tour with Simon, he met saxophonist Michael Brecker, which led to Botti co-producing a track on the Brecker Brothers' Out of the Loop titled "Evocations".

=== Verve recordings (1995–2000) ===
Botti's solo debut, First Wish, was released in 1995; his second effort, Midnight Without You, which included a collaboration with Blue Nile vocalist Paul Buchanan, appeared in 1997. These were followed by Slowing Down the World in 1999, which included vocal contributions from Sting and Jonatha Brooke (also on the Midnight Without You release).

Botti composed the score and recorded a soundtrack for the 1996 film Caught.

In the late 1990s, Botti was a member of Bruford Levin Upper Extremities, a group exploring a more experimental, jazz fusion-oriented sound than his solo records.

Starting in 1999, Botti toured with Sting as a featured soloist in the Brand New Day tour. The two-year run culminated in All This Time, a CD/DVD-taping and webcast performance from Sting's estate in Tuscany on September 11, 2001. Botti says his close friendship with Sting was an important development in his career.

=== Columbia recordings (2001–2022) ===
Botti was introduced to Columbia by Bobby Colomby, drummer and founding member of Blood, Sweat & Tears, who went on to become his producer and manager. Botti's first Columbia release was Night Sessions in 2001. This was followed in 2002 by December, a holiday album, which included an original composition by Richard Marx. The project represented the only time Botti has performed vocals on two tracks.

A Thousand Kisses Deep, was released in 2003 and contained a group of originals and covers that accent Botti's crossover appeal as both a jazz and pop musician. When I Fall in Love followed in 2004, which featured a more traditional sound than its predecessor.

To Love Again: The Duets, released in 2005, continued where the previous album left off with more lush orchestral jazz via the London Session Orchestra, this time showcasing guest vocalists — as well as a handful of instrumental tracks.

In May 2005, Botti was invited to perform at Oprah Winfrey's Legends Ball weekend honoring her African American heroines. In 2006, Billy Childs, Gil Goldstein and Heitor Pereira won the Grammy for Best Instrumental Arrangement Accompanying Vocalist(s): "What Are You Doing the Rest of Your Life?" (Chris Botti and Sting) from Botti's album To Love Again – The Duets. 2006 also marked his first PBS collaboration, Chris Botti Live: With Orchestra and Special Guests, released in early 2006. The CD and platinum-certified DVD included duets with Sting, Burt Bacharach, Gladys Knight, Jill Scott and Renee Olstead.

On September 25, 2007, Botti released an album titled Italia. The album places focus on Botti's Italian roots through such songs as "Venice", "Estaté", and the title track "Italia", on which he partnered with Andrea Bocelli. In December 2007, the album was nominated for the Grammy Award for Best Pop Instrumental Album. Botti also performed the song with Bocelli during the 2007 edition of the Teatro del Silenzio, which was released on DVD titled Vivere Live in Tuscany in 2008.

Early in 2009, Botti released his second CD/DVD PBS project, Chris Botti In Boston. Performing with the Boston Pops Orchestra, Botti shared the stage with Yo-Yo Ma, Steven Tyler, Josh Groban, Katharine McPhee, John Mayer, Sting, and others.

His first few releases are often classified as smooth jazz, though critic Alex Henderson argues that Botti's music was a cut above much of the genre; reviewing his 1999 album, Slowing Down the World, Henderson writes "it would be a major mistake to lump it in with... outright elevator muzak ... Botti is capable of a lot more." That same year as well as the following year, Botti appeared as a Pennington Great Performers series artist with the Baton Rouge Symphony Orchestra.

On April 17, 2012, Botti released his tenth studio album Impressions. On February 10, 2013, the album received the Grammy Award for Best Pop Instrumental Album.

On August 18, 2018, PBS released Botti's third PBS project, "Great Performances: The Chris Botti Band in Concert", where he was joined on stage by vocalists Sy Smith and Veronica Swift, violinist Caroline Campbell and organist Joey DeFrancesco, along with pianist Taylor Eigsti.

=== Blue Note Records and Vol. 1. (2023–present) ===
In August 2023, the lead single of Botti's debut album on Blue Note Records, a version of the standard ″Old Folks″, was released. The album itself, entitled Vol. 1, was released in October of the same year.

== In media ==
Botti played the theme song on trumpet in closing scenes and credits in the 1998 film Playing by Heart.

Botti was the leader of the house band on the nationally syndicated daytime talk show The Caroline Rhea Show for its only season in 2002–2003. He was named one of People magazine's 50 Most Beautiful People of 2004.

Botti performed "The Star-Spangled Banner" in MetLife Stadium for a crowd of over 80,000 and a worldwide television audience on November 3, 2014, prior to the Indianapolis Colts vs. New York Giants National Football League game.

Botti appeared in the Season 3 The Real Housewives of Beverly Hills episode "Don't Sing For Your Supper" as a dinner guest of Yolanda Hadid and David Foster.

== Instrument ==
Botti plays a Martin Committee large-bore Handcraft trumpet made in 1939, and uses a No. 3 silver-plated mouthpiece from Bach made in 1926, having recently retired his 1920 3C Bach mouthpiece. He uses a Leblanc Vacchiano Harmon mute from the 1950s.

Before getting the Martin Handcraft Committee, Chris Botti played on a 1972 Calicchio S1 ML trumpet originally sold in September 1972. Dominick Calicchio's wife Irma Calicchio erased the original owner's name and information and put in Chris Botti's name as the official owner. He later traded the Calicchio S1 for the 1939 Handcraft Martin Committee.

== Discography ==
=== Studio albums ===
Title	Album details	Peak chart position				Certification
Title	Album details	US	US Jazz	CAN	POL	Certification
First Wish	Released: February 28, 1995; Label: Verve Forecast	—	—	—	—	
Caught (Soundtrack)	Released: 1996; Label: Verve Forecast	—	—	—	—	
Midnight Without You	Released: May 20, 1997; Label: Verve Forecast	—	—	—	—	
Slowing Down the World	Released: June 22, 1999; Label: GRP	—	—	—	—	
Night Sessions	Released: October 2, 2001; Label: Columbia	—	4	—	—	
December	Released: October 22, 2002; Label: Columbia	124	4	—	—	
A Thousand Kisses Deep	Released: September 13, 2003; Label: Columbia	—	4	—	—	
When I Fall in Love	Released: September 28, 2004; Label: Columbia	37	1	56	—	US [RIAA]: Gold
To Love Again: The Duets	Released: October 18, 2005; Label: Columbia	18	1	54	—	US [RIAA]: Gold
Italia	Released: September 25, 2007; Label: Columbia/Decca	27	1	—	1	POL (ZPAV): Platinum
Impressions	Released: April 17, 2012; Label: Columbia	32	1	62	8	
Vol. 1	Release: October 20, 2023; Label: Blue Note	—	8	—	81	
"—" denotes a release that did not chart.

=== Live albums ===
Title	Album details	Peak chart position			Certification
Title	Album details	US	US Jazz	POL	Certification
Live: With Orchestra and Special Guests	Released: 2006; Label: Columbia	—	2	—	
Chris Botti In Boston	Released: March 31, 2009; Label: Decca	13	2	6	US (RIAA): Platinum; POL (ZPAV): Diamond
"—" denotes a release that did not chart.

=== Compilations ===
Title	Album details	Peak chart position		Certification
Title	Album details	US Jazz	POL	Certification
The Very Best of Chris Botti	Released: 2002; Label: GRP	47	—	
This Is Chris Botti	Released: 2011; Label: Columbia	—	1	POL (ZPAV): Platinum
"—" denotes a release that did not chart.

== Collaborations ==
- Remote – Hue And Cry (1989)
- Through the Storm – Aretha Franklin (1989)
- The Rainy Season – Marc Cohn (1993)
- Bette of Roses – Bette Midler (1995)
- A Few Small Repairs – Shawn Colvin (1996)
- Burning the Daze – Marc Cohn (1997)
- Bruford Levin Upper Extremities (album) – Bruford Levin Upper Extremities (1998)
- Brand New Day – Sting (1999)
- B.L.U.E. Nights – Bruford Levin Upper Extremities (2000)
- ...All This Time – Sting (2001)
- It Had to Be You: The Great American Songbook – Rod Stewart (2002)
- Sacred Love – Sting (2003)
- Renee Olstead – Renee Olstead (2004)
- A Christmas Album – James Taylor (2004)
- Heart & Soul – Joe Cocker (2004)
- It's Time – Michael Bublé (2005)
- Libra – Toni Braxton (2005)
- Givin' It Up – Al Jarreau, George Benson (2006)
- Bring It On Home... The Soul Classics – Aaron Neville (2006)
- James Taylor at Christmas – James Taylor (2006)
- Skylark – Renee Olstead (2009)
- If on a Winter's Night... – Sting (2009)
- Symphonicities – Sting (2010)
- A Time for Love – Arturo Sandoval (2010)
- What Matters Most – Barbra Streisand (2011)
- Privateering – Mark Knopfler (2012)
- Merry Christmas, Baby – Rod Stewart (2012)
- Natalie Cole en Español – Natalie Cole (2013)
- Born and Raised – John Mayer (2013)
- Encore: Movie Partners Sing Broadway – Barbra Streisand (2016)
- Down to My Last Bad Habit – Vince Gill (2016)

== Awards and nominations ==
=== Grammy Awards ===
The Grammy Awards are awarded annually by the National Academy of Recording Arts and Sciences in the United States.

Year	Work	Award	Result
2008	Italia	Best Pop Instrumental Album	Nominated
2010	Chris Botti in Boston	Best Pop Instrumental Album	Nominated
2010	"Emmanuel"	Best Instrumental Arrangement	Nominated
2010	Chris Botti in Boston	Best Long Form Music Video	Nominated
2013	Impressions	Best Pop Instrumental Album	Won

== See also ==
- 20th century brass instrumentalists
- List of trumpeters
- List of jazz trumpeters
