= Shane Fontayne =

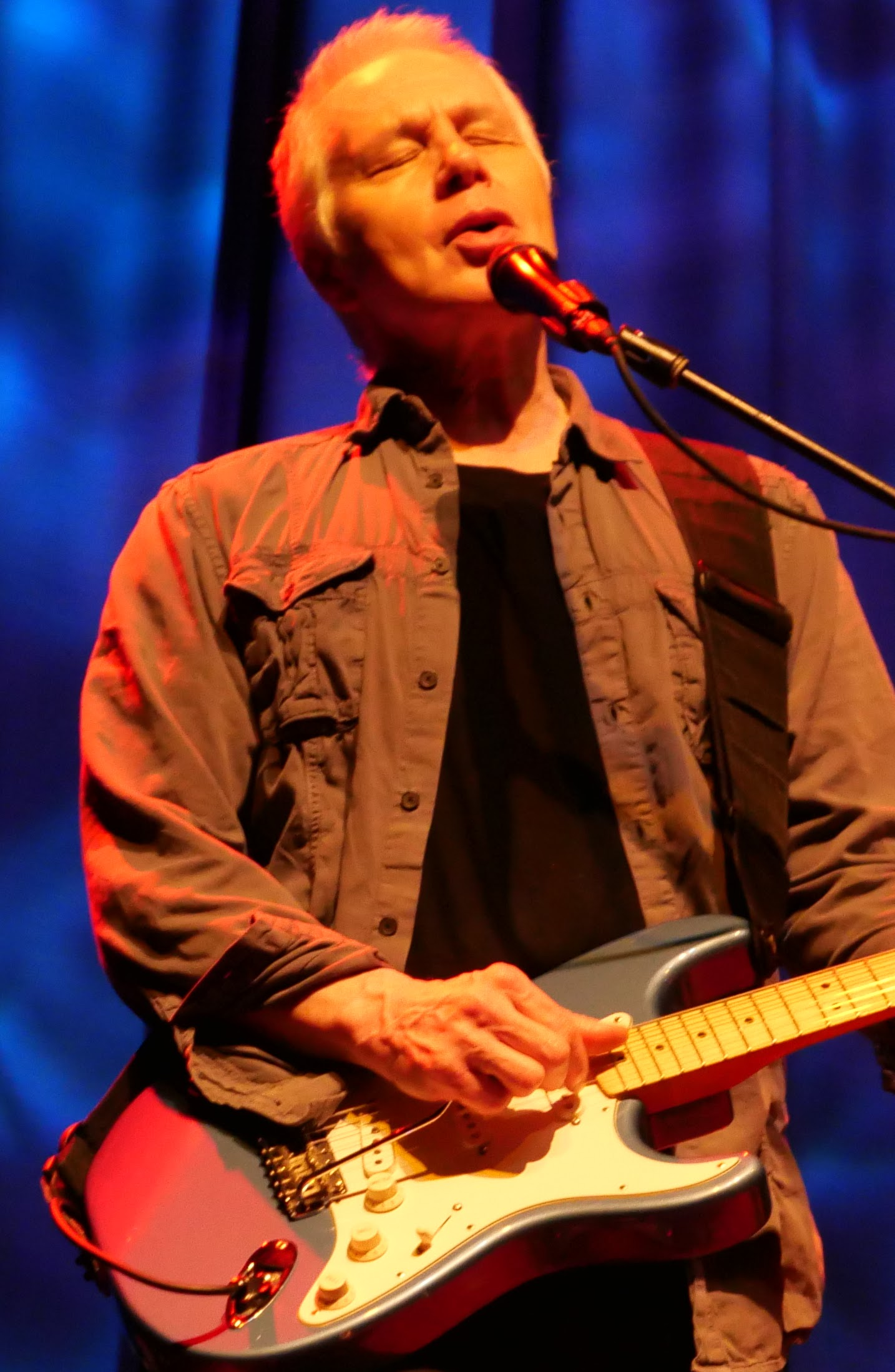
- Fontayne performing in 2022
- Born: Michael Barakan; 29 April 1954 (age 72); London, England
- Other name: Mick Barakan
- Years active: 1970s–present
- Spouse: Mackenzie Phillips (m. 1986; div. 2000)
- Children: 1
- Relatives: Peter Barakan (brother)
- Musical career
- Genres: Pop; rock
- Occupations: Musician, audio engineer, sideman
- Instruments: Guitar; vocals
- Formerly of: Byzantium
- Website: shanefontayne.com

Michael Barakan (born 29 April 1954), known as Shane Fontayne, is an English rock guitarist. Active since the 1970s, he was the guitarist for Bruce Springsteen during the 1992–1993 "Other Band" Tour, as Springsteen had disbanded his own E Street Band three years earlier. During his career Fontayne has worked with Ian Hunter, Van Zant, John Waite, Chris Botti, Joe Cocker, Johnny Hallyday, Marc Cohn, Randy VanWarmer, Graham Nash, Mick Ronson and others.

== Career ==
In the 1970s Fontayne was associated with Byzantium, an English psychedelic music band, after being in their precursor Ora, and over the years has worked with a range of artists, including Steve Forbert (Little Stevie Orbit, 1980 album), Lone Justice (Shelter, 1986 album), Maria McKee (Maria McKee, 1989 album) and later Joe Cocker (Heart & Soul, 2004 album), Richard Marx (My Own Best Enemy, 2004 album).

He has also been the guitarist for the French rocker Johnny Hallyday for his 1995 tour "Lorada tour", and 1996 concert in Las Vegas. In addition, Fontayne has been singer/songwriter Marc Cohn's touring guitarist since 1998. He has recently worked with Crosby, Stills & Nash and Graham Nash (solo) on tour (also producing the latter's 2016 album This Path Tonight).

On 2 December 2012, Fontayne played lead electric guitar for Ann and Nancy Wilson's version of "Stairway to Heaven" with Jason Bonham taking his father's position on drums honoring the remaining members of Led Zeppelin at the Kennedy Center Honors ceremony.

== Personal life ==
Fontayne was married to actress Mackenzie Phillips from 1986 to 2000. The couple have a son, Shane (b. 1987). Fontayne's brother, Peter, is a music critic in Japan.

== Discography ==
- 1991: "Merchants of Venus"
- 2003: What Nature Intended
- 2006: Voodoo at the Mint
