= Construction of One World Trade Center =

Coordinates: 40.7115°N 74.0133°W

One World Trade Center is the main building of the rebuilt World Trade Center complex in Lower Manhattan, New York City. Construction of One World Trade Center was deferred until 2006 because of disputes between the Port Authority of New York and New Jersey and the developer. Tishman Realty & Construction is the selected builder. The building reached ground level on May 17, 2008, and was topped out on May 10, 2013. One World Trade Center opened to tenants on November 3, 2014, and One World Observatory opened to the public on May 29, 2015.

== 2004–2007 ==
One World Trade Center is considered the first major building whose construction is based upon a three-dimensional Building Information Model. The symbolic cornerstone of One World Trade Center was laid down in a ceremony on July 4, 2004, but further construction of the tower was stalled until 2006. The cornerstone was temporarily removed from the site on June 23, 2006. The project was delayed due to disputes over money, security and design but the last major issues were resolved on April 26, 2006 with a deal between developer Larry Silverstein and the Port Authority of New York and New Jersey. During the summer of 2006, explosives were detonated at the World Trade Center construction site, testing the use of charges to clear bedrock for the building's foundation. Controlled explosions continued for approximately two months thereafter.

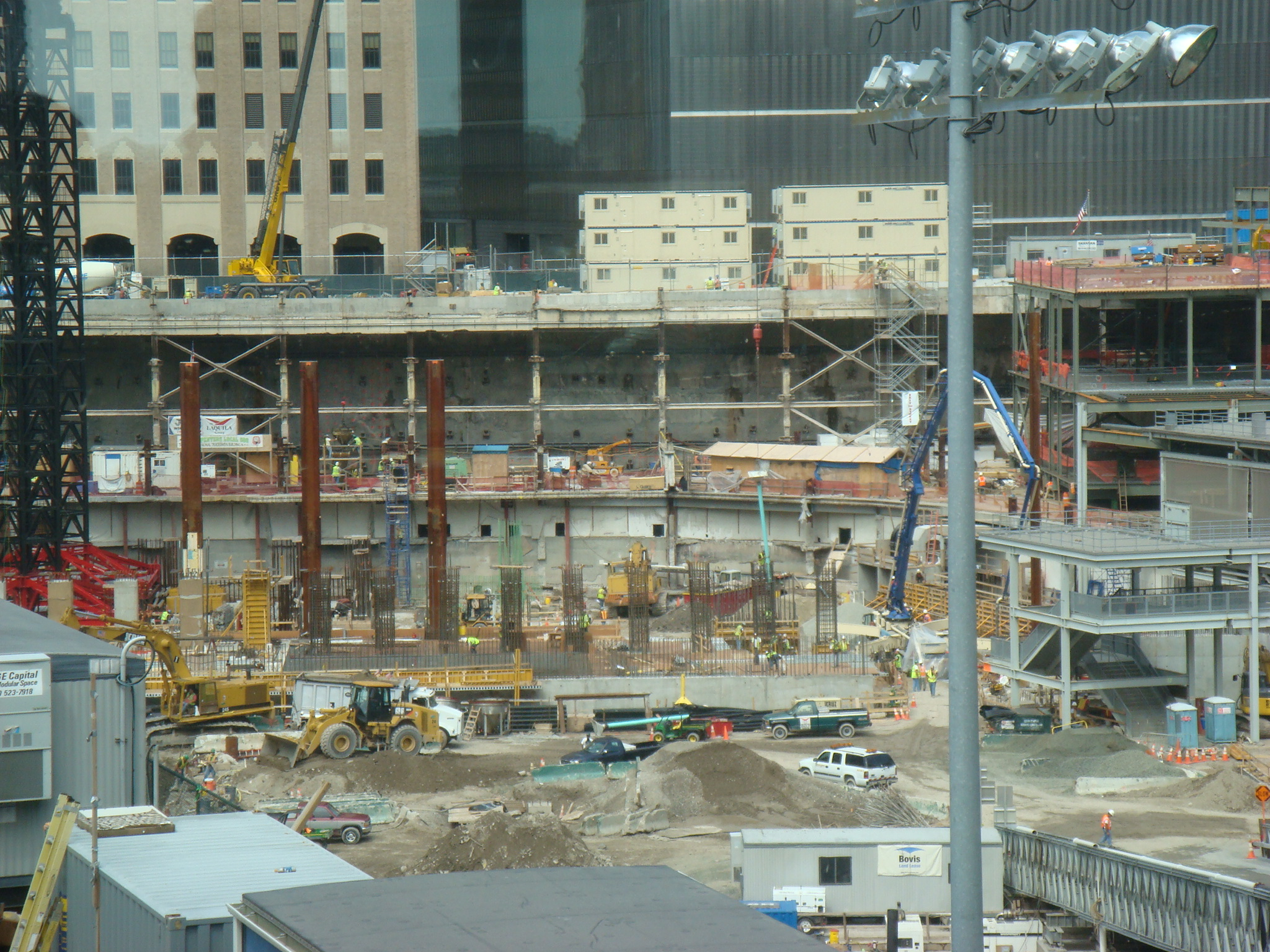
One World Trade Center tower construction as of August 7, 2007.

On November 18, 2006, 400 cubic yards (310 cubic meters) of concrete were poured onto the foundation of the One World Trade Center, carried by as many as 40 trucks. On December 17, 2006, a ceremony was held in Battery Park City, with the public invited to sign a 30-foot (9.1 m) steel beam. This beam, the first to be installed, was welded onto the building's base on December 19, 2006.

On January 9, 2007, a second set of beams was welded to the top of the first set. February 2007 estimates put the cost for construction of 1 WTC at $3 billion, or $1,150 per square foot ($12,380 per square meter). Approximately $1 billion of insurance money recouped by Silverstein in connection with the September 11 attacks is being used for construction of the new One World Trade Center. The State of New York is expected to provide $250 million toward construction costs, and the Port Authority agreed to finance another $1 billion through bonds. In 2007, Tishman Construction Corporation of New York completed a row of steel columns at the perimeter of the construction site. Two tower crane bases were erected, each base containing a functioning luffing-jib tower crane. By the end of 2007, the tower's footings and foundations were nearly complete.

== 2008 ==
In January 2008, two construction cranes were moved into the construction site. The tower's concrete core began rising in the first months of 2008. By February 22, 2008, 9,400 of the nearly 50,000 short tons (45,000 t) of steel necessary had been ordered. By March 2008, the steel for the tower had reached 70 feet (21 m) high, 10 feet (3 m) below street level. From late March through early April, a 40-foot (12 m) tall mockup of a section of the tower's wall with twenty-four windows was tested by Construction Consulting Laboratory West in Ontario, California. The purpose of the testing was to ensure that the all-glass exterior of the tower will be able to withstand earthquakes and extreme weather conditions. Testing also took place on another full-scale mockup south of Albuquerque, New Mexico. Both mockups passed the tests. In mid-April, a batch of concrete had to be replaced after it failed a stress test.

On May 17, 2008, the tower's steel reached street level when new sections were bolted to two of the twenty-four jumbo steel columns marking the building's footprint. The new column sections brought the height of the structure up to 15 feet (4.6 m) above street level. In June, the chamfered steel skeleton of the tower's concrete base had begun to take shape. By the end of the month, the concrete had been poured for the floor of the tower's basement level B3. In his June 30, 2008 World Trade Center Rebuilding Assessment to the then New York Governor David Paterson, Port Authority executive director Christopher O. Ward noted that roughly 90 percent of the construction contracts had been bid.

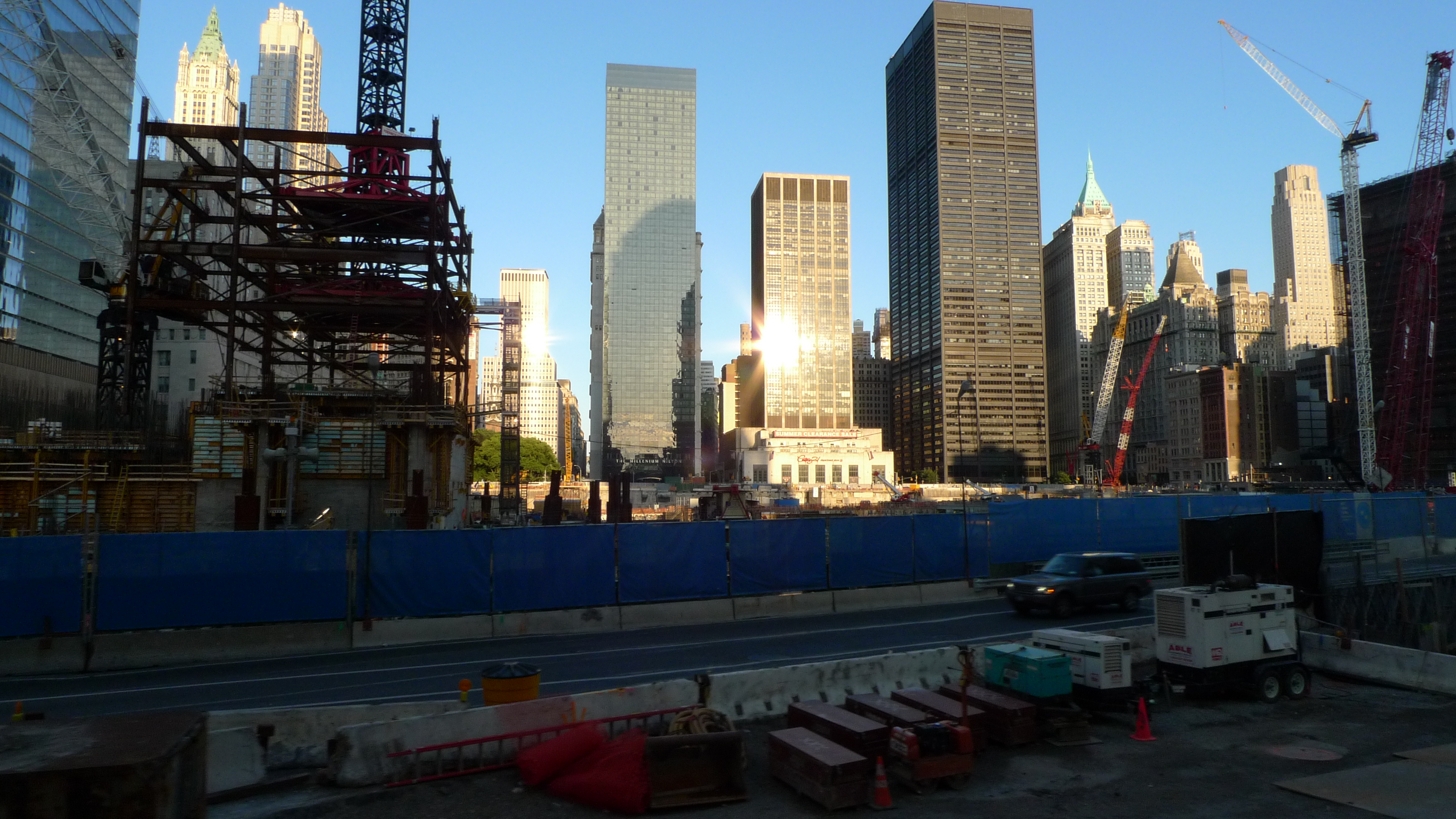
One World Trade Center Site on July 12, 2009.

By August, 1 WTC had reached 25 feet (7.6 m) above street level. During its September 16 meeting, the Port Authority board approved contracts for security and building management systems, and 95% of the contracts needed to complete the tower had been signed. The $20 million security contract includes sophisticated video analysis in which computers would alert security personnel to abnormal situations automatically. On October 10, Collavino Construction poured an additional 520 cubic yards (400 m^{3}) of concrete for the tower's concrete core, raising it to just above street level.

== 2009 ==
By February 11, 2009, the tower was 105 feet (32 m) above street level. On July 2, 2009, over 1,200 cubic yards (920 m^{3}) of concrete were poured to form parts of the street-level plaza. On August 13, the builders of 1 WTC set a 70 short tons (64,000 kilograms) piece of steel into place—the largest column installed yet at the building. Each steel column, made at a factory in Luxembourg, was about 60 feet (18 m) long. The columns at the bottom of the tower's foundation were about 35 feet (11 m) long.

By November 1, 2009, the twenty-four perimeter columns of 1 WTC were all erected, and construction of the second floor (the first floor above ground level) was nearly complete. In addition, The Port Authority of New York and New Jersey reported in their 2009 Q3 Annual Report that steel erection should commence by January 2010, and that the typical floor construction could begin.

== 2010 ==
Steel and concrete installation continued in 2010, where two cranes were on site. The fifth floor was finished on January 16. In February, construction began on the sixth floor, the last floor of 1 WTC's base, and the Port Authority announced that the tower's steel superstructure had reached 200 feet (61 m) above street level. By the end of March 2010, steel beams began to be erected for the second office floor. In April, the 45-degree octagon was installed, the building's steel frame had reached 26 floors, and concrete was completed on the base structure in the latter part of the month.

In May 2010, the Port Authority stated that they were building close to one floor per week, and was projected that One World Trade Center would reach 55 stories by the end of 2010. The cocoon system was also installed, marking the first time a cocoon safety system has been installed on a steel superstructure in the city.

On July 13, 2010, workers found remains of an 18th-century sailing ship at the World Trade Center site while excavating for the underground Vehicle Security Center for One World Trade Center. The remains of a 32-foot (9.8 m) section of the ship's hull and a 100-pound (45 kg) anchor were found. The hull had been truncated and the beams sawed. The ship was likely used as landfill material during the early 19th century to help expand Manhattan. Timbers from the ship were removed and sent to a laboratory to try to date the vessel. An additional section of the ship was found on the site in August 2011, giving historians more information about the vessel, which was active around the 1770s.

By October 2010, the tower's steel superstructure reached 44 stories. In November, stainless steel and glass facade panels were being prepared for later installation, with the panels scheduled to be assembled between the 20th and 24th floors. On November 13, the first glass facade panels were installed on the 20th floor. Steven Coleman, spokesman for the Port Authority, stated, "Once they get rolling, they'll be able to install glass panels at a rate of one floor per week." By November 17, the tower's steel had reached 48 stories.

The Port Authority announced on December 16, 2010 that 1 WTC had reached the 52nd floor, and had risen to over 600 feet (180 m), marking the halfway point for the construction of the building's steel frame.

== 2011 ==
By February 2011, the tower had reached 56 floors, 667 feet (203 m) above grade, while the glass panels reached the 27th floor. On May 12, 2011, plans led to install prismatic glass on the building's base were cancelled due to technical problems.

By June 15, 2011, One World Trade Center had reached the 70th floor, the glass facade installation had reached the 45th floor, and concrete flooring had been installed up to the 63rd. On August 1, 2011, concrete workers and carpenters at the tower walked off the job one month after their labor contract had expired. The workers returned to work on August 3.

== 2012 ==
Construction slowed from January to February 2012 due to an unseasonably warm winter which caused high winds and icing conditions to form on top of the structure making it hazardous for the construction workers. Further delays were caused by financial problems with a steel supplier which slowed delivery of steel beams to One World Trade Center. It took over two months to complete the 92nd floor. With the weather improving in March and financial issues being resolved, the construction progressed above the 92nd floor. 1 WTC later surpassed the Bank of America Tower as the 3rd tallest in the city. In May 2012, it was announced that the 408-foot spire originally planned to adorn the top of One World Trade will have its radome stripped, revealing the mast of the same height. This announcement was withdrawn in September 2013. On November 12, 2013, One World Trade Center was given the official height by the CTBUH as the Tallest Building in the Northeastern United States. (surpassing the Willis Tower amongst much debate), eleventh tallest in the world, and was given the title of the World's Tallest Spire. (Burj Khalifa, the tallest building in the world, has a shorter spire, despite starting at a higher altitude.)

On June 21, 2012, One World Trade Center Topped out at roof level, leaving the building to rank around 30th place among all other skyscrapers. Construction slowed again from late June till mid July due to high temperatures which caused the building to remain at roof level, leading to a delay in the installation of the antenna spire. With temperatures easing by July 16, construction crews began installing parapet steel at the top of 1 WTC. On July 18, the first node steel was installed. On July 31, 2012, all corner parapet columns, also called "node steel", were installed around the perimeter of the tower. A special beam, signed by the U.S. President Barack Obama, local officials and the construction workers, was raised on August 2, 2012. A ceremony was held for the occasion, but officials denied that it was considered a topping-out ceremony. By August 10, 2012, concrete flooring had been completed to the 93rd story of the tower, One World Trade Center had risen to the 105th floor and glass installation was at the 82nd floor. The building was structurally topped out on August 30, 2012 when the last of the spandrel beams were installed between the parapet columns.

In late 2012, the workers were installing a temporary steel framework at the top of the tower to support the 408-foot (124 m) steel spire during assembly. The spire was fabricated as 16 separate sections at a factory near Montreal, Quebec, Canada and was transported by barge to New York City in mid-November. Just after Thanksgiving, crews began to transport the spire segments one by one to the WTC site. Upon reaching the WTC site, the spire sections were being assembled, piece by piece, at the top of 1 WTC.

On December 12, 2012, the first of nine pieces of the spire were lifted to the 104th floor. Another nine smaller pieces were trucked in from Montreal.

== 2013–2015 ==
On May 10, 2013, the last two sections of the building's spire were installed making it the tallest building in the Western Hemisphere, and the 3rd tallest building in the world.

The exterior elevator began removal in late January 2014 and concluded in early June 2014. Base cladding began in February 2013 and concluded in June 2014. Work began on the construction of the plaza surrounding the building in late 2013 and interior work was finished in November 2014.

The building opened in November 3, 2014, to 175 employees of publisher Condé Nast.

On May 29, 2015, the One World Observatory, at the tower's top, opened to the public.

== Gallery ==
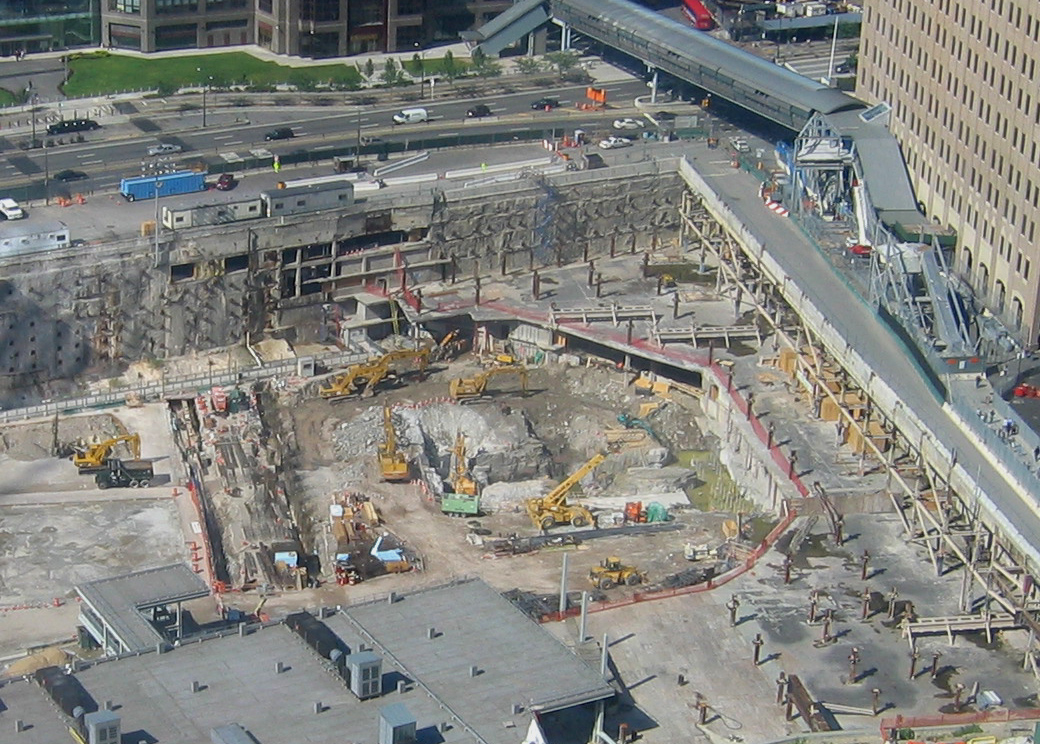
Concrete construction, as of October 7, 2006

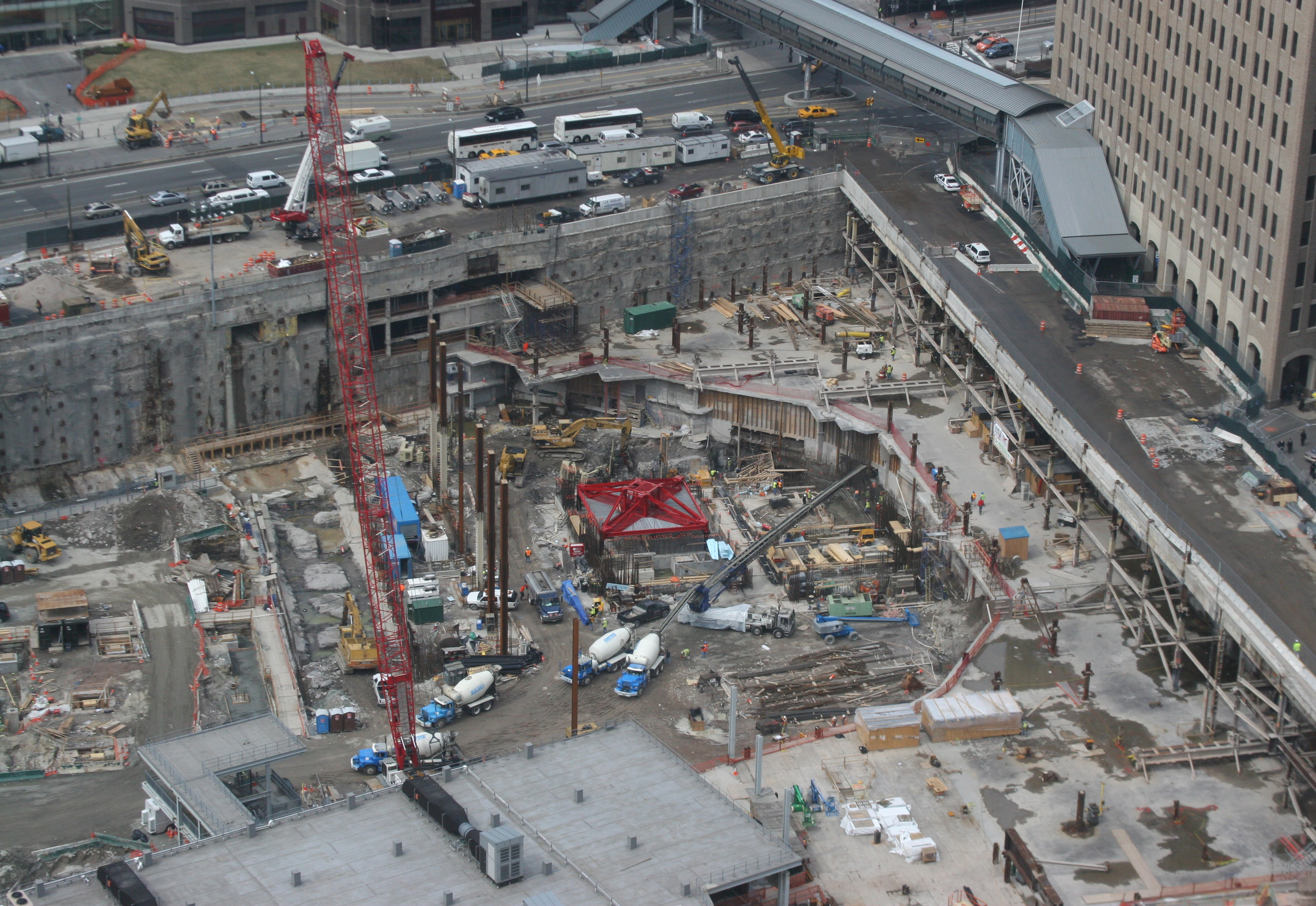
Steel installation, as of March 26, 2007

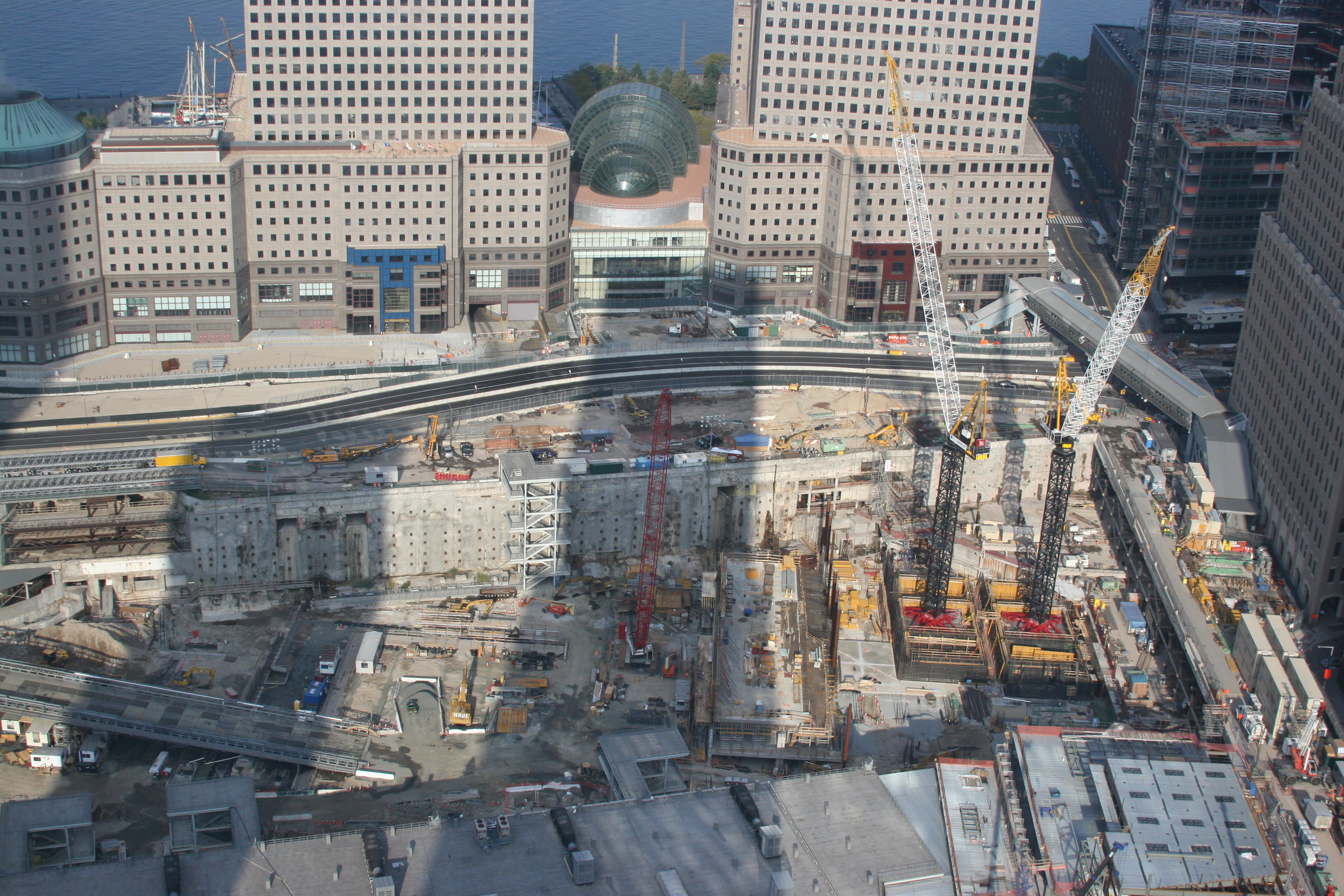
Foundation construction, as of October 7, 2007

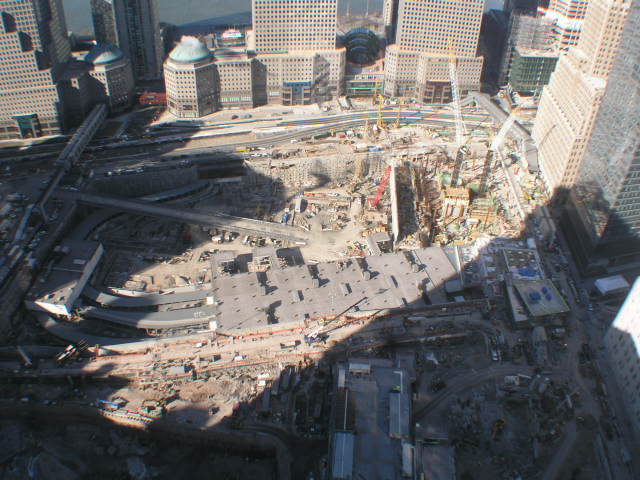
Construction progress, as of January 21, 2008

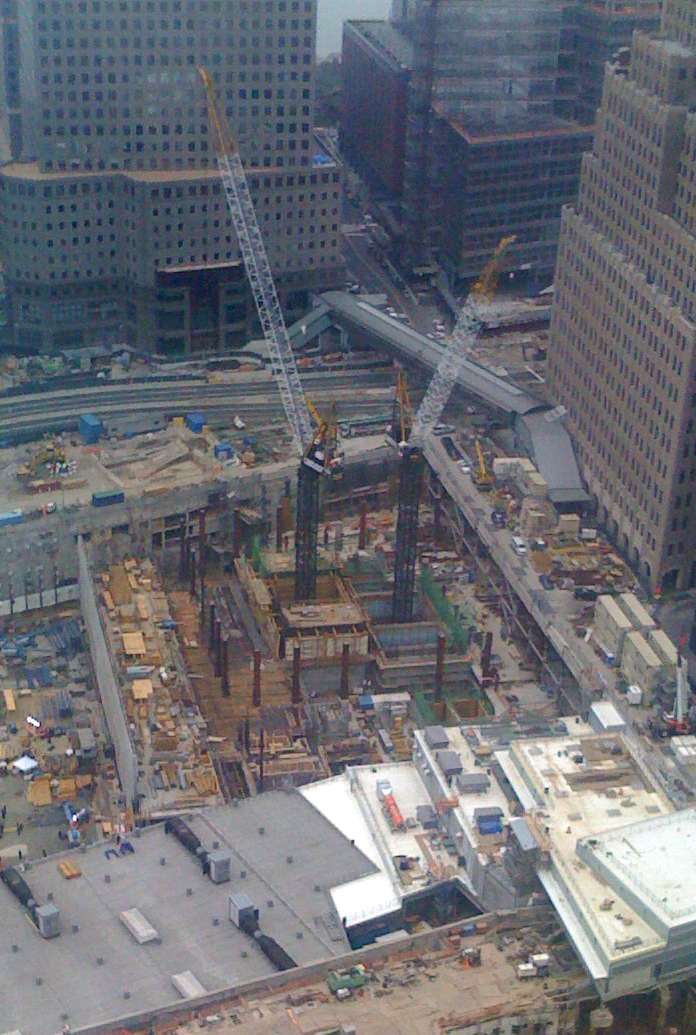
Concrete foundation, as of April 20, 2008

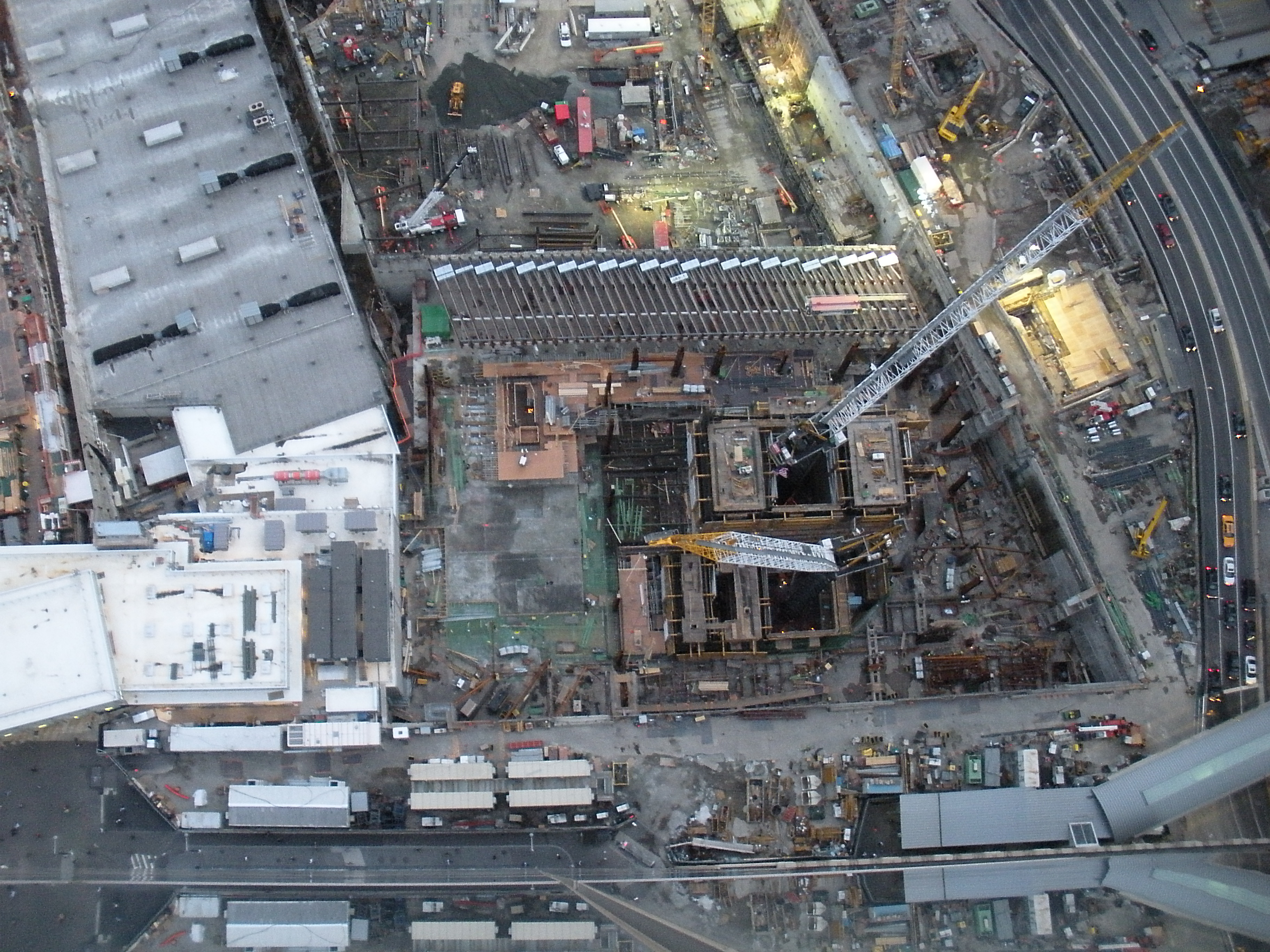
Construction progress, as of September 10, 2008

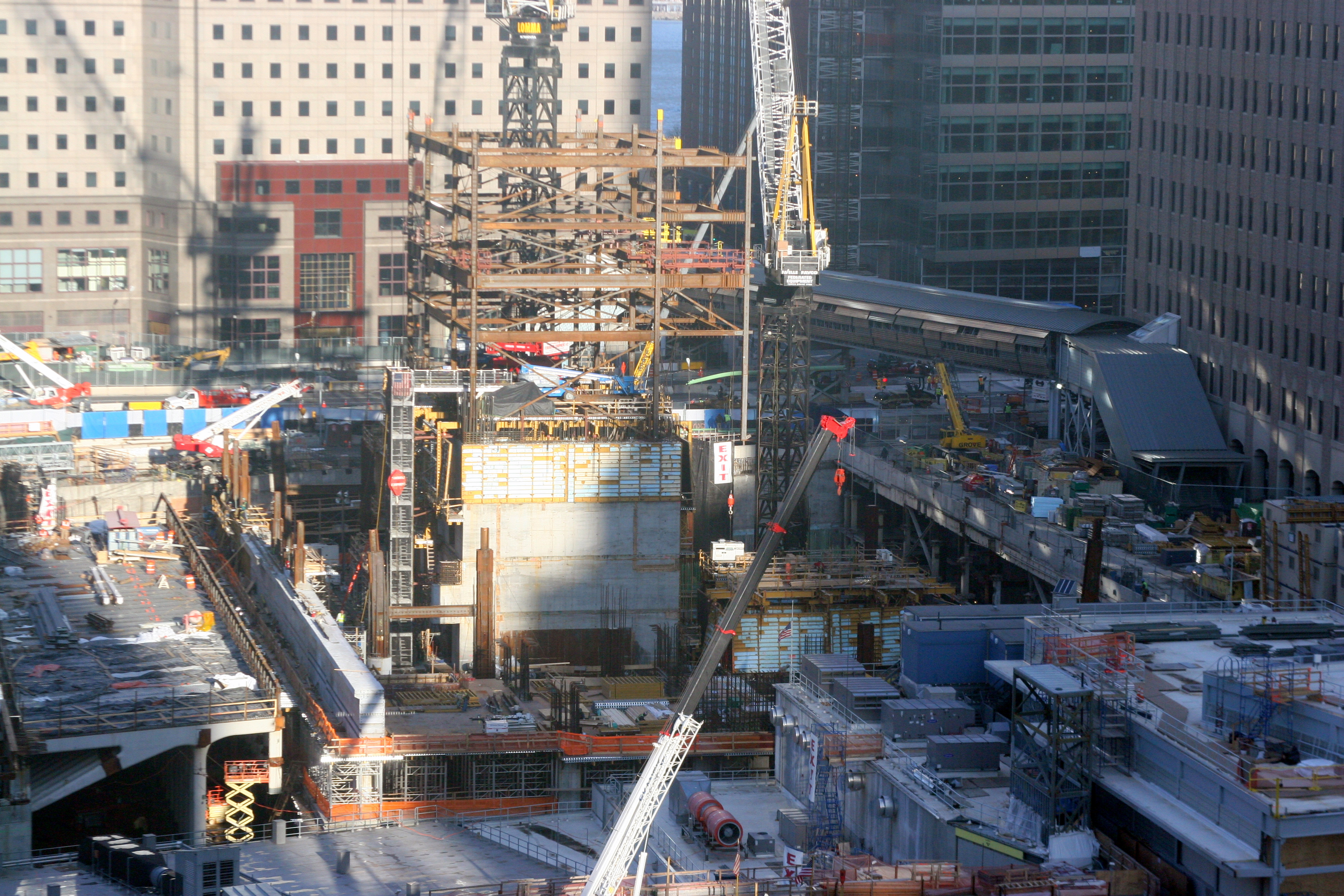
One WTC above street level, as of February 28, 2009.

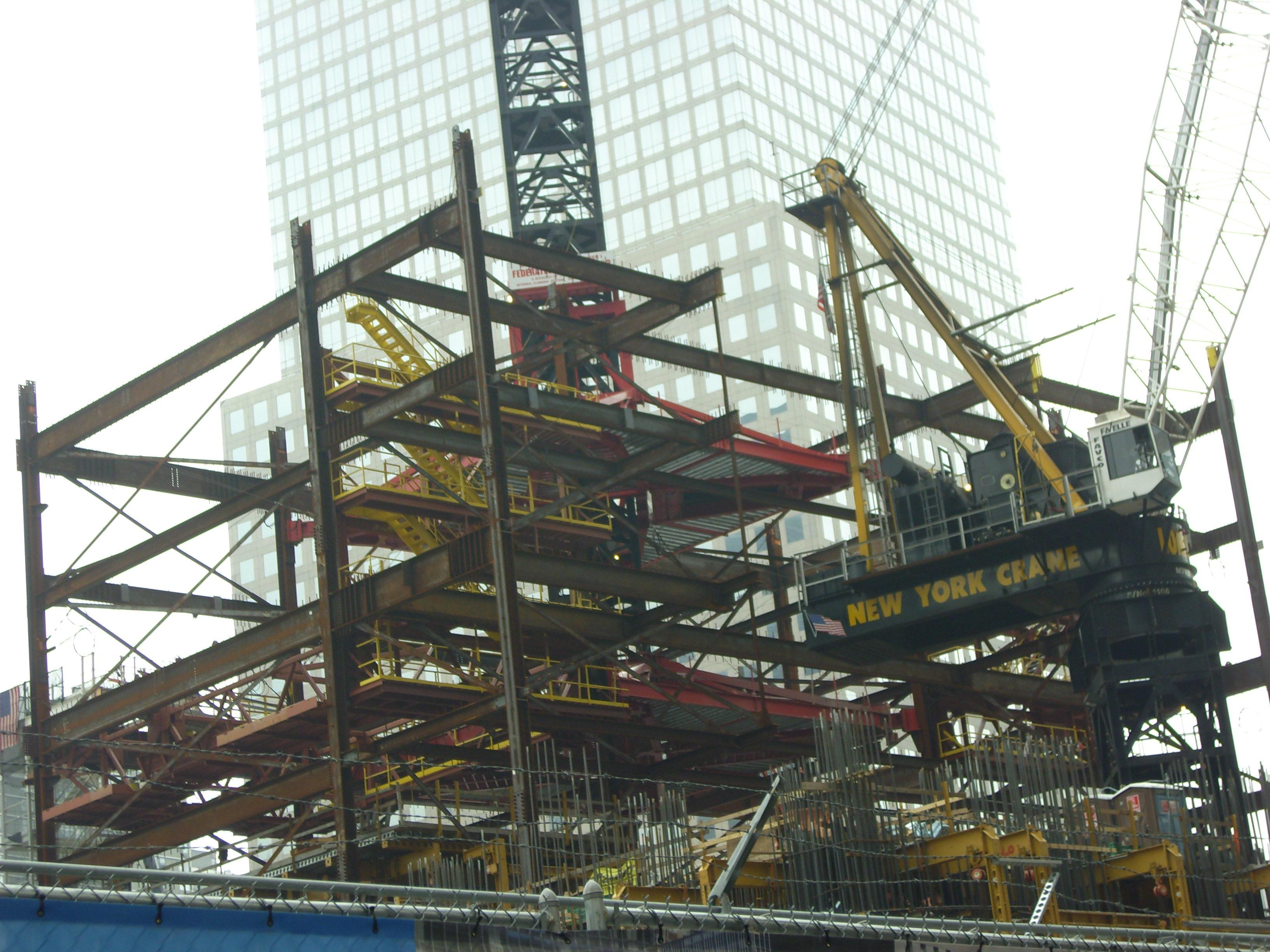
One WTC viewed from street level on July 29, 2009.

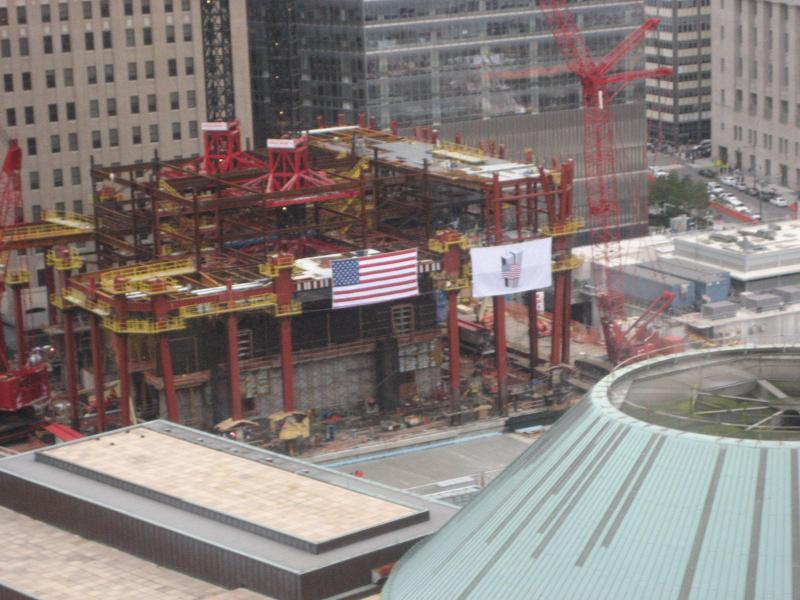
The final lobby column being installed on October 31, 2009.

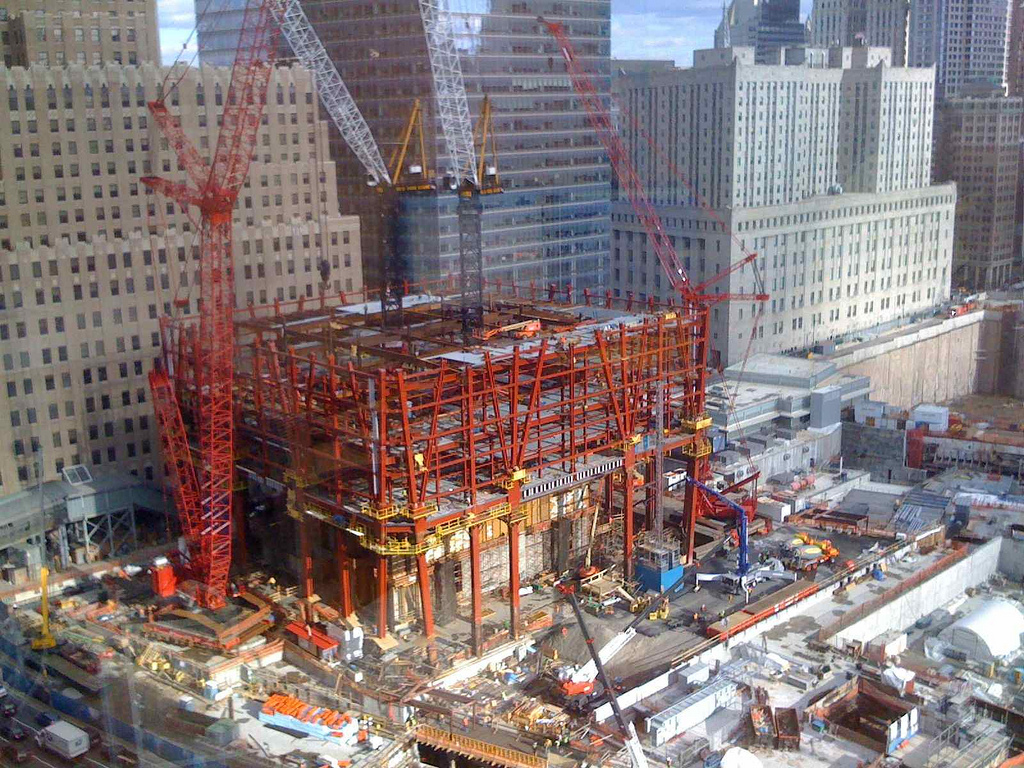
Construction reaching the 17th floor, as of December 10, 2009.

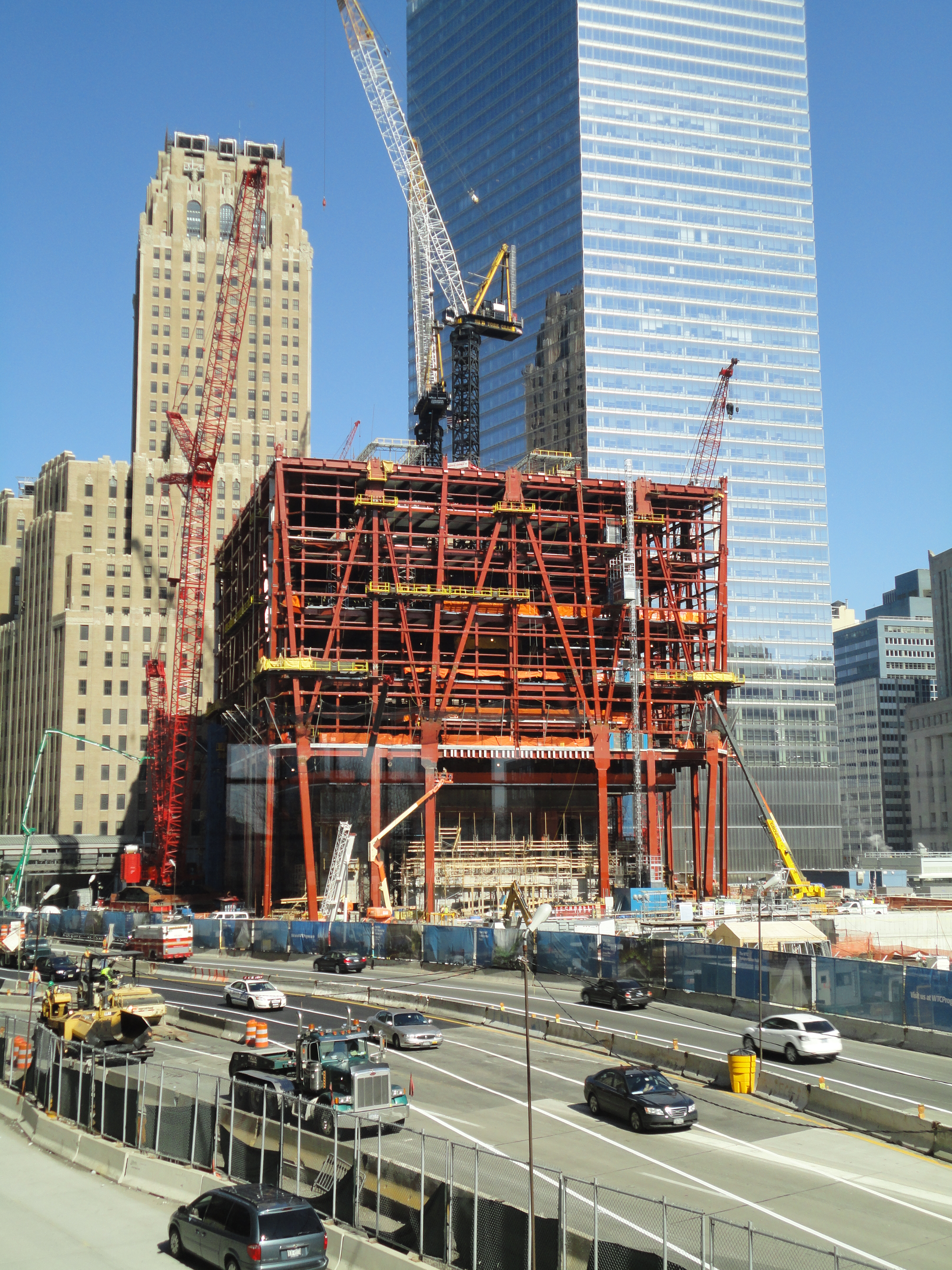
View from the World Financial Center, March 8, 2010.

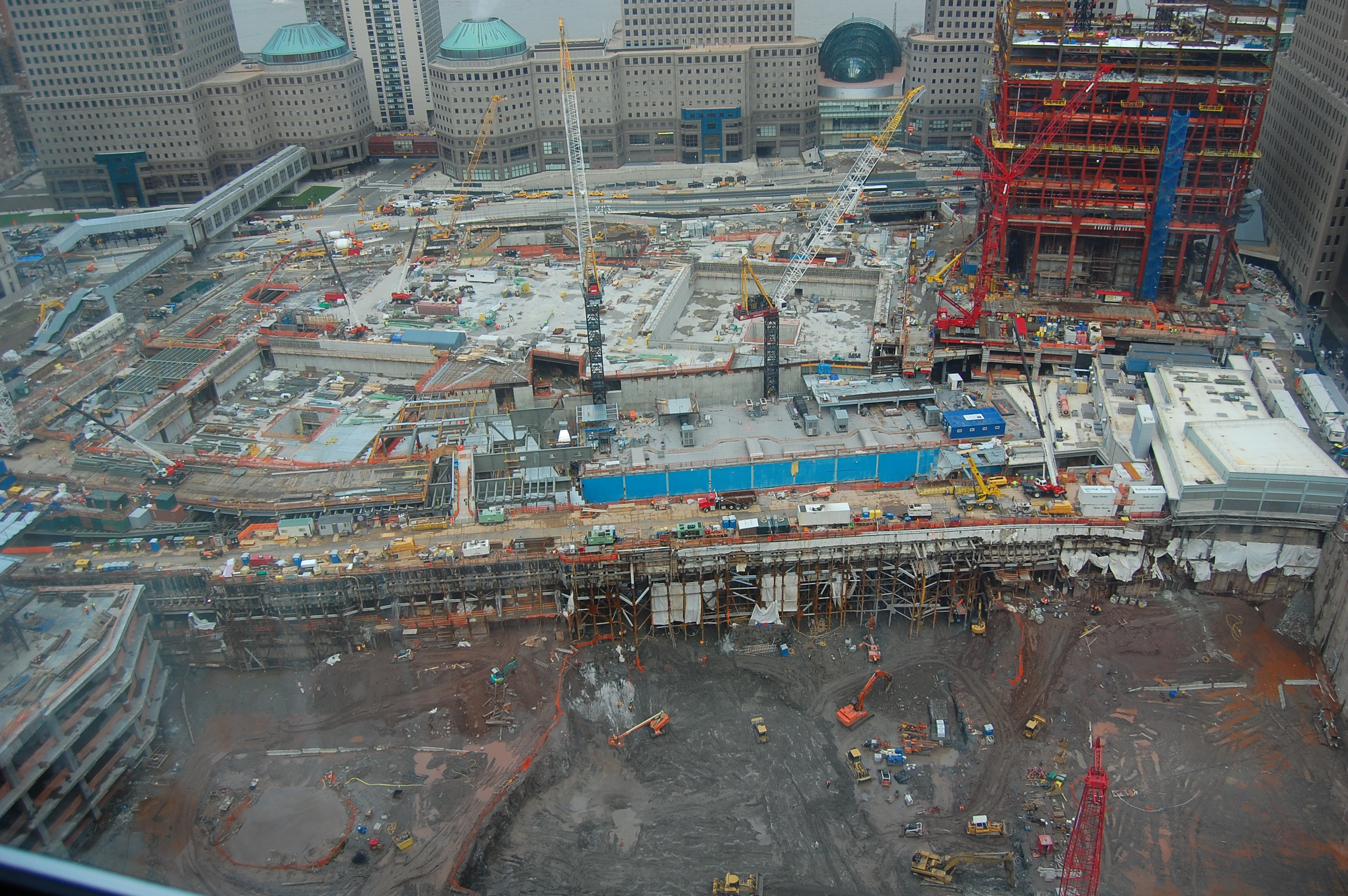
Construction progress, as of April 2010.

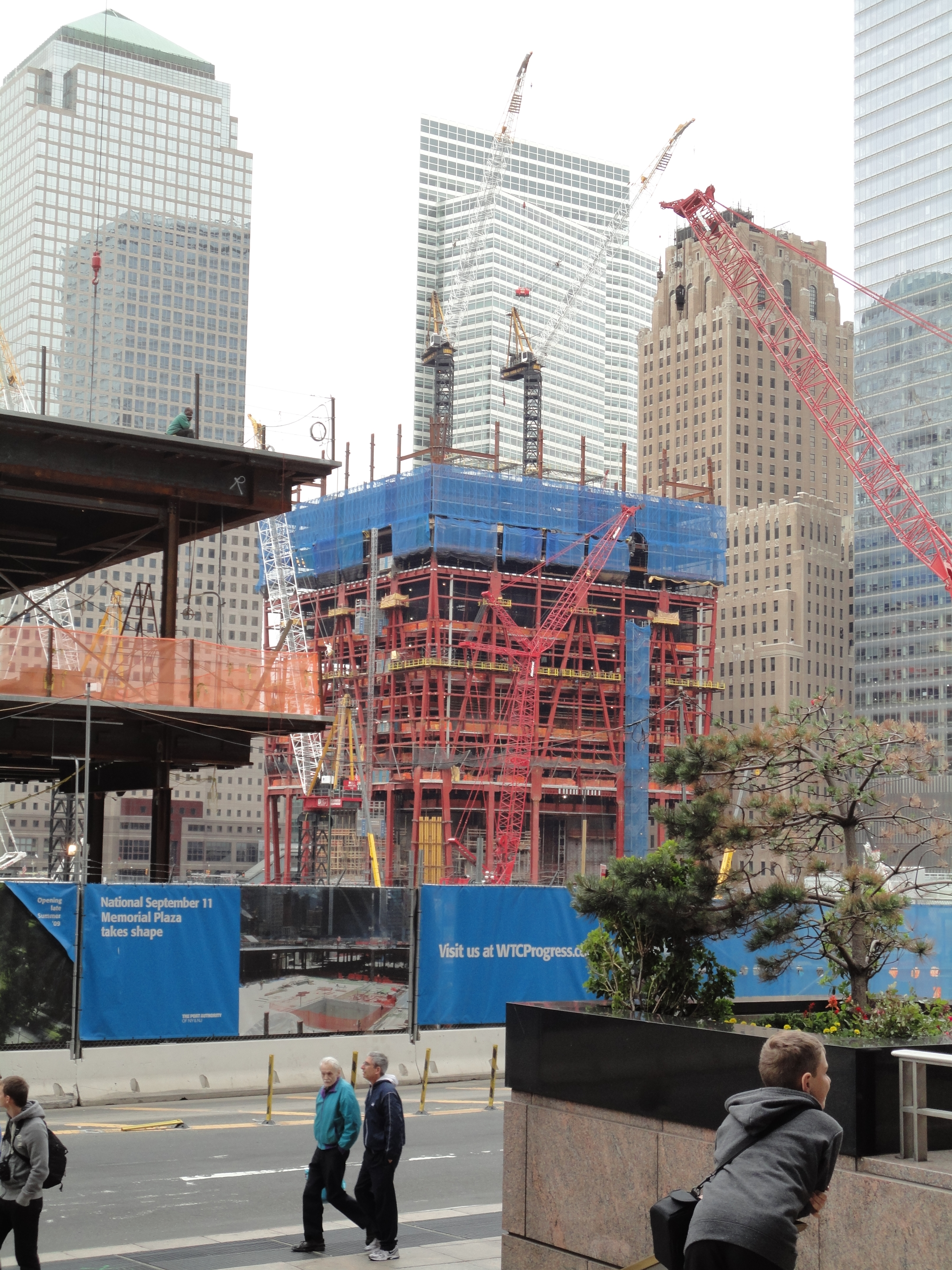
View from Church Street, May 11, 2010, as steel tops the 24th floor.

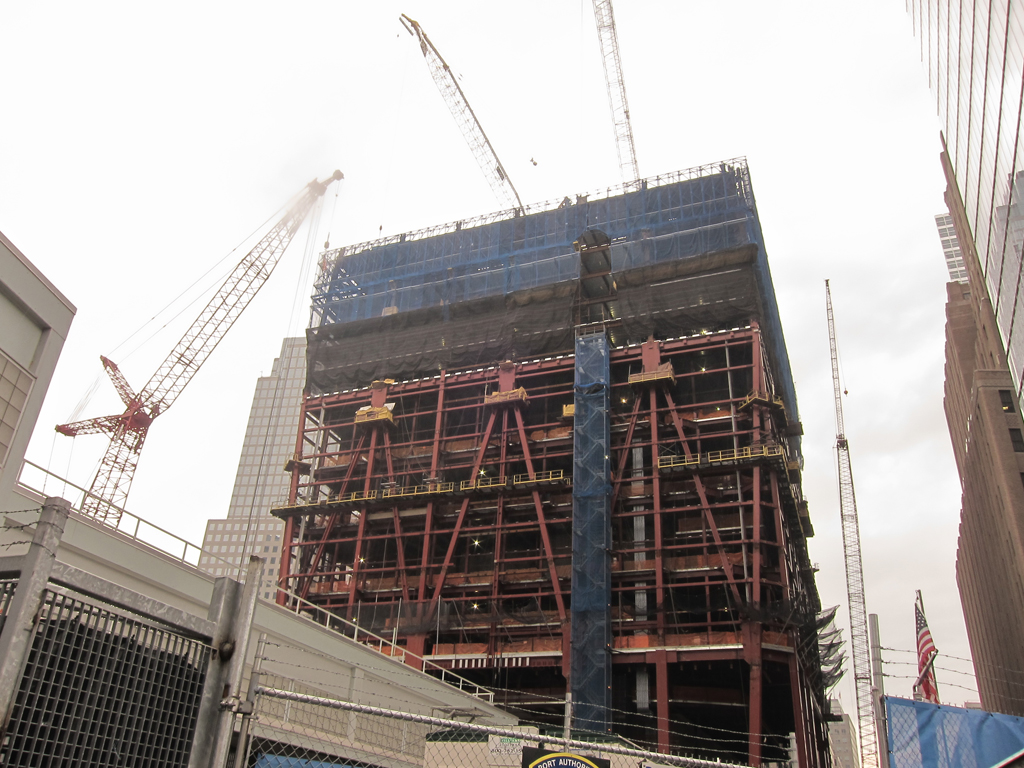
View from the PATH station entrance, June 10, 2010, as steel tops the 26th floor.

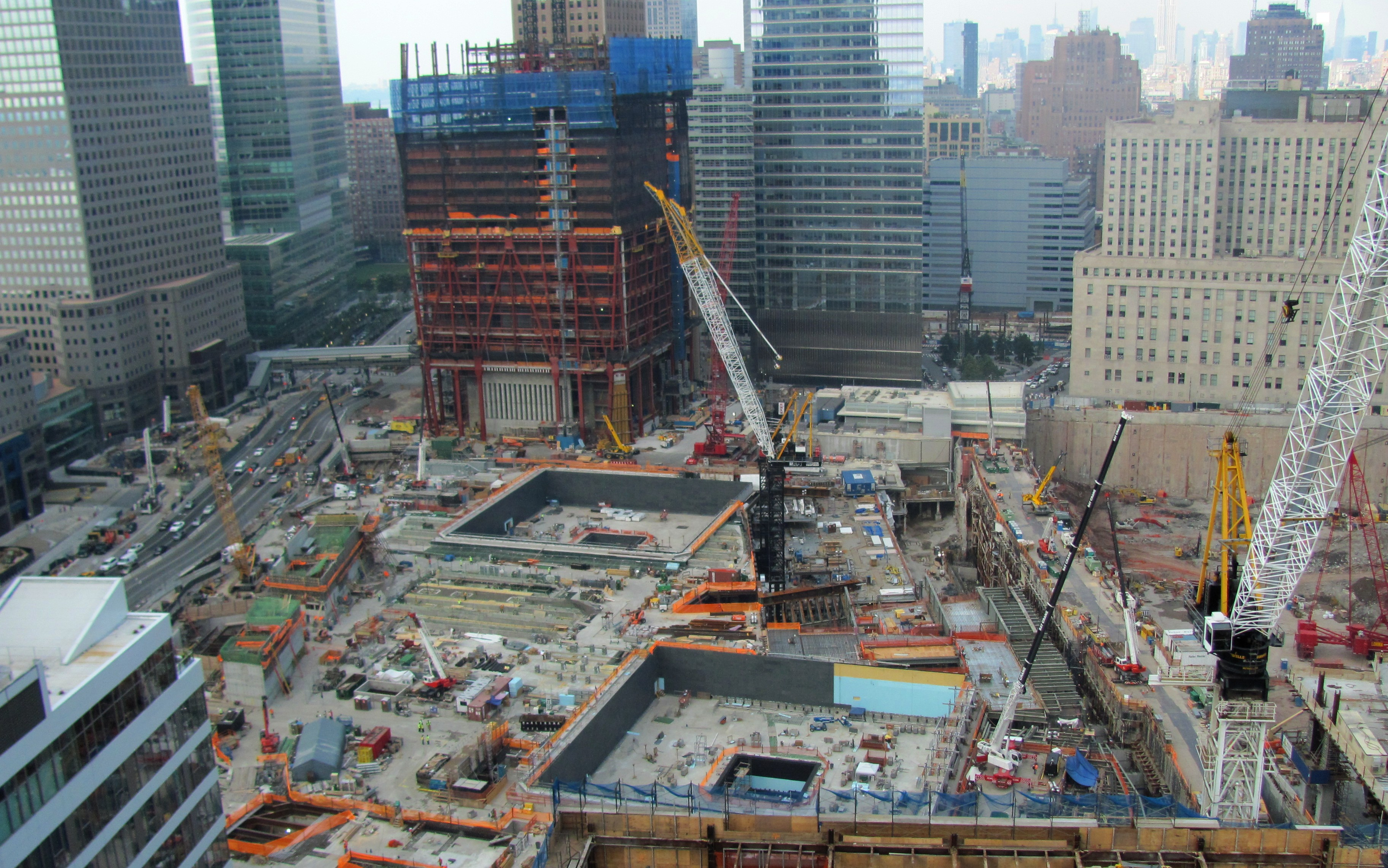
Construction work as of July 28, 2010, as steel reached the 30th floor.

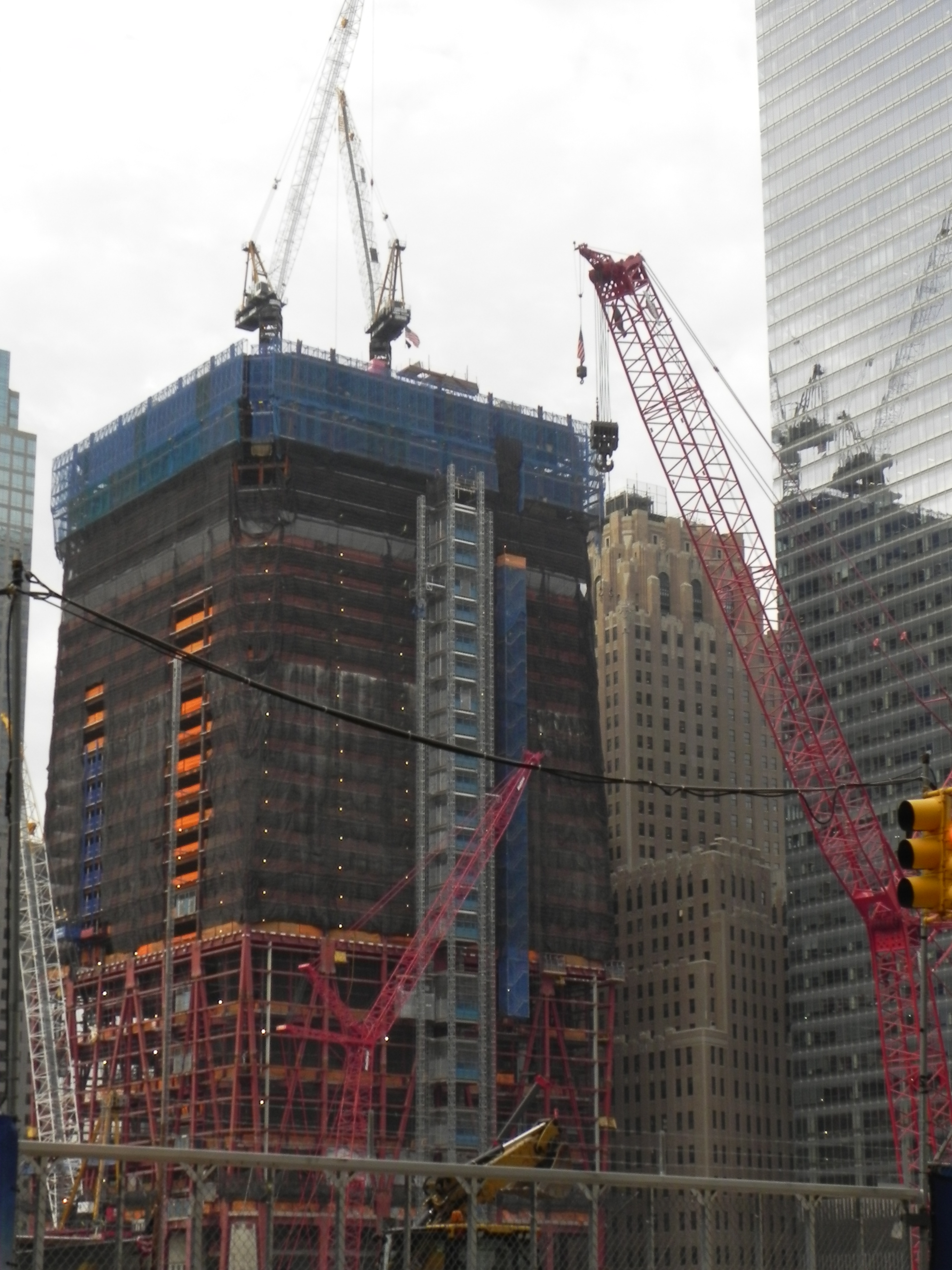
Construction as of September 28, 2010, as steel reached the 42nd floor.

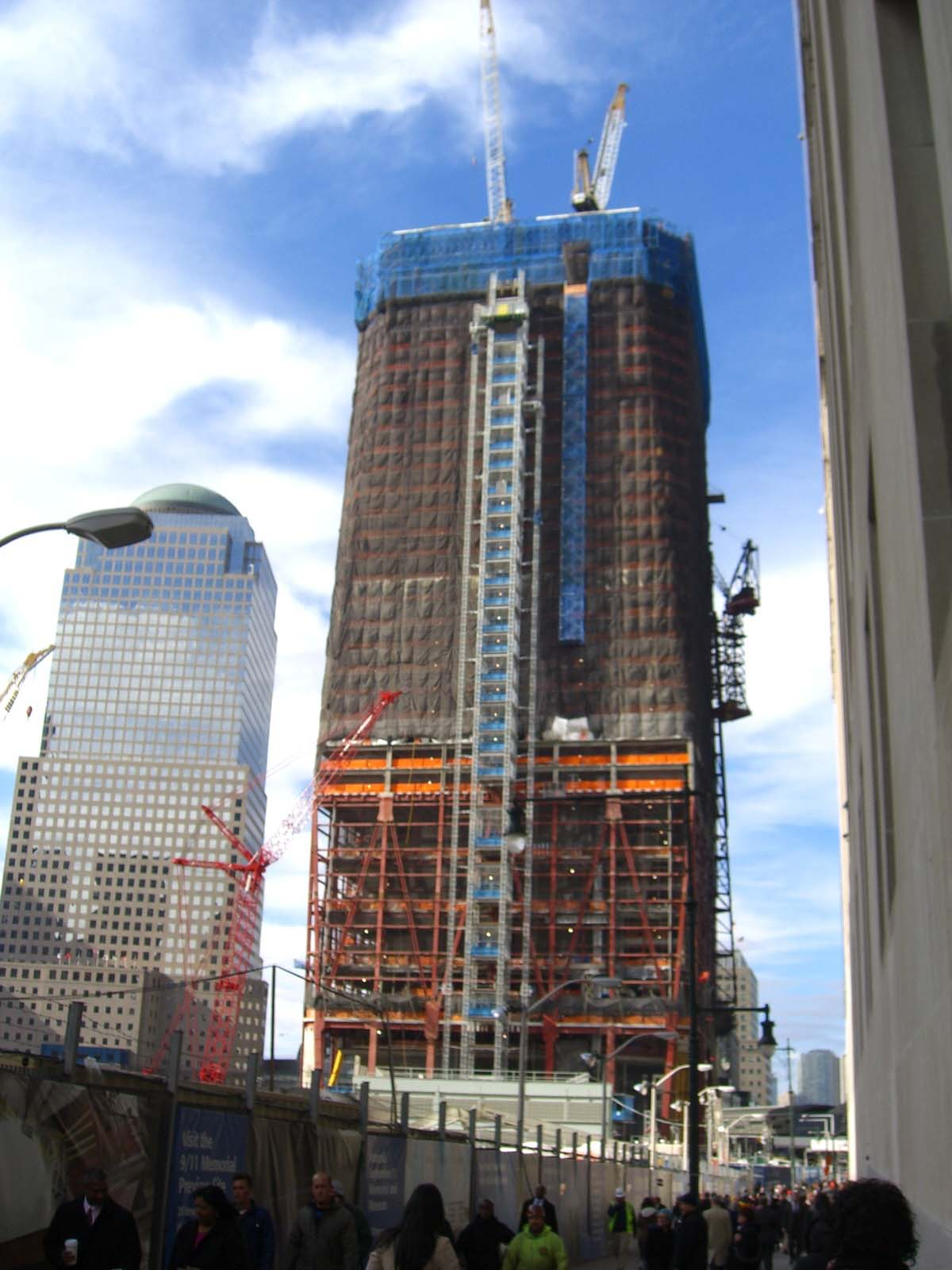
One World Trade Center on November 10, 2010, reaching the 48th floor.

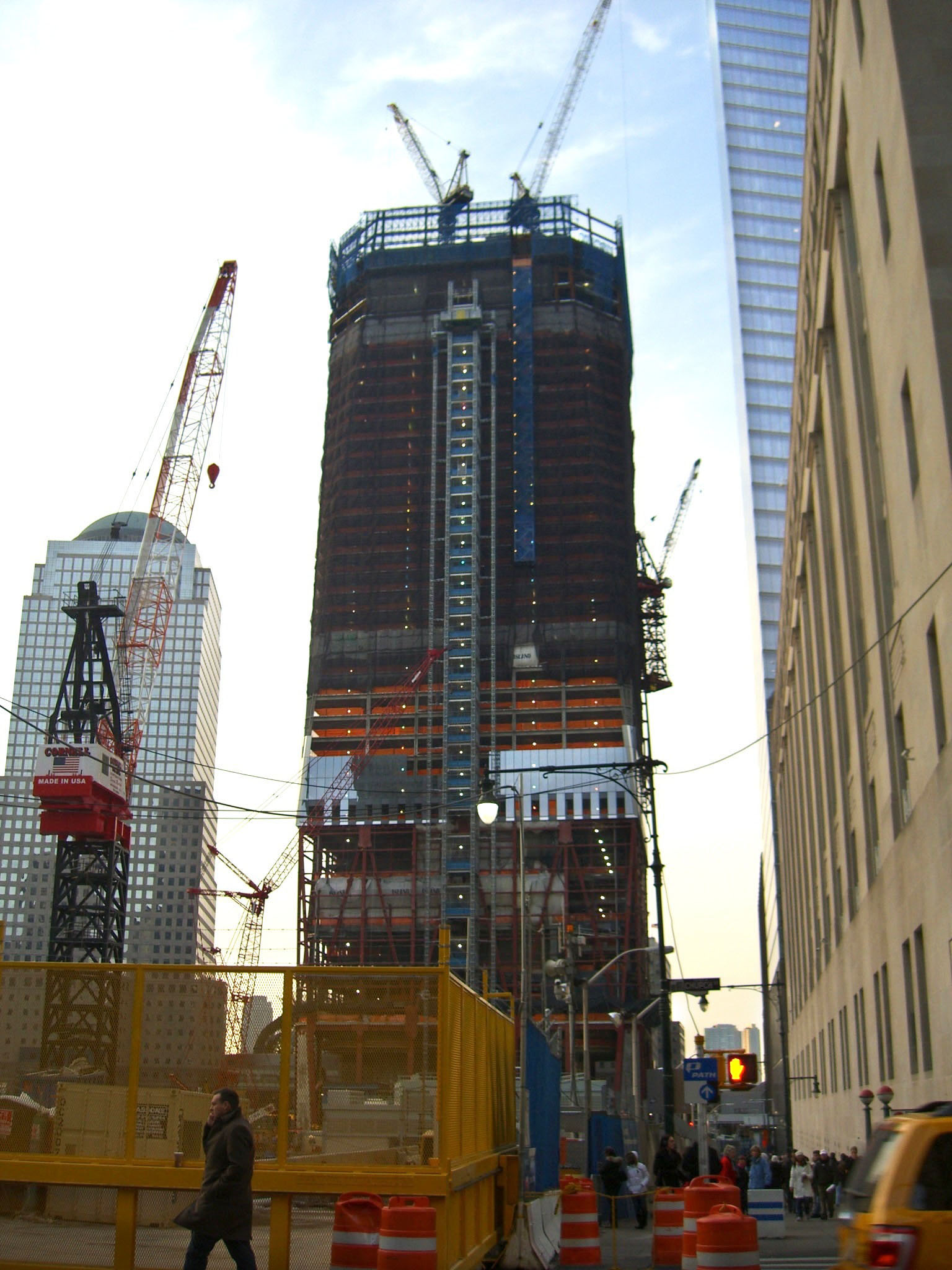
December 19, 2010, after steel reached the 52nd floor; the halfway point.

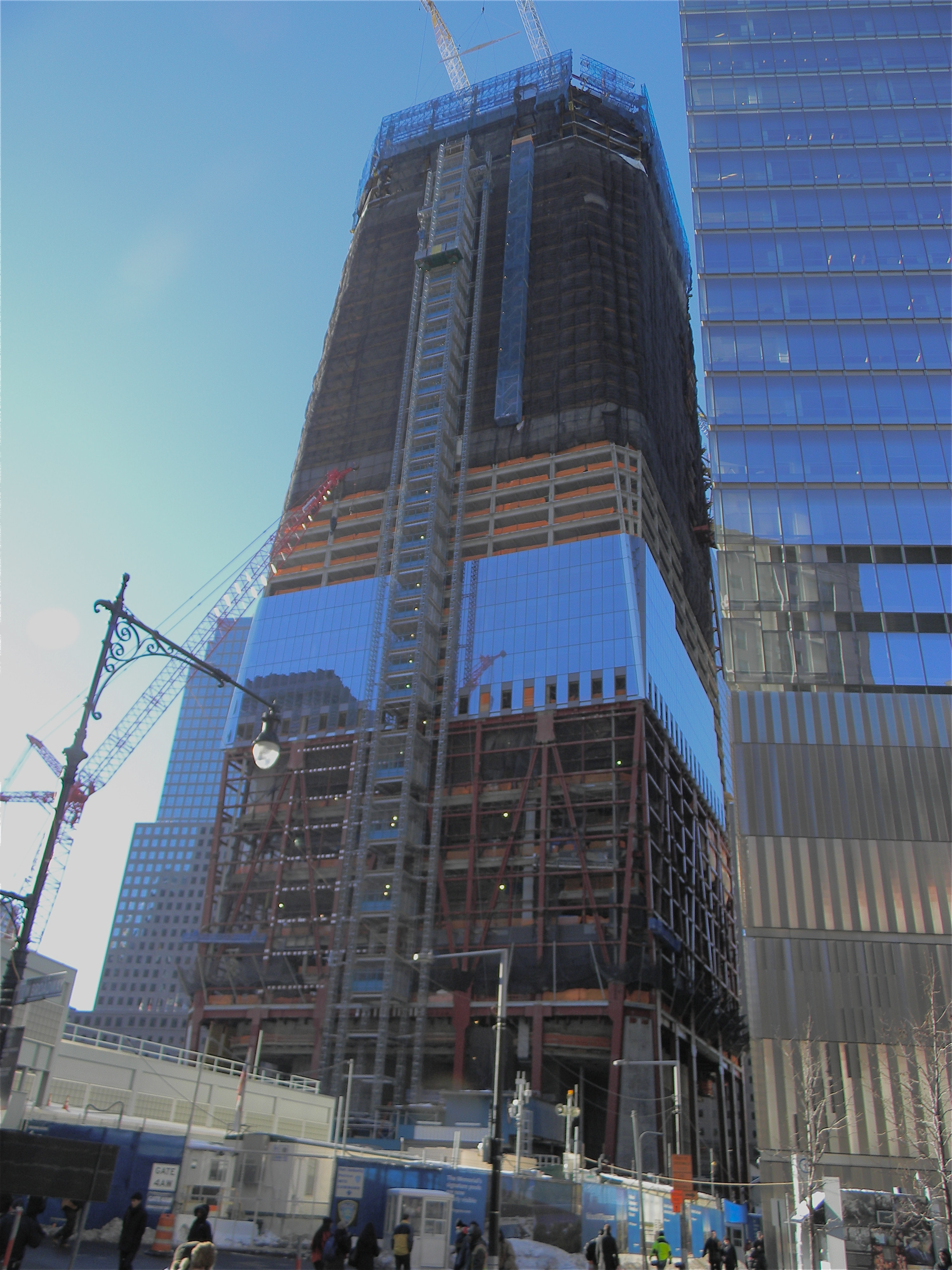
As of January 13, 2011, with the glass facade clearly visible.

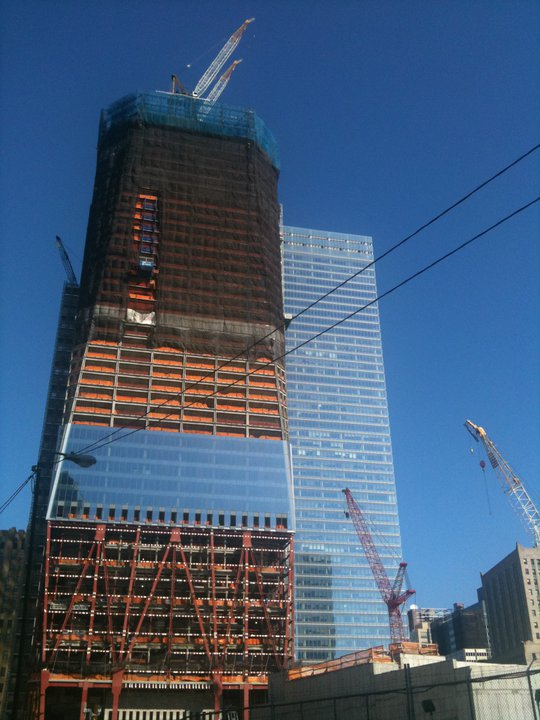
View from West Street as of February 5, 2011. 7 World Trade Center is visible in the background on the right. Steel tops the 56th floor.

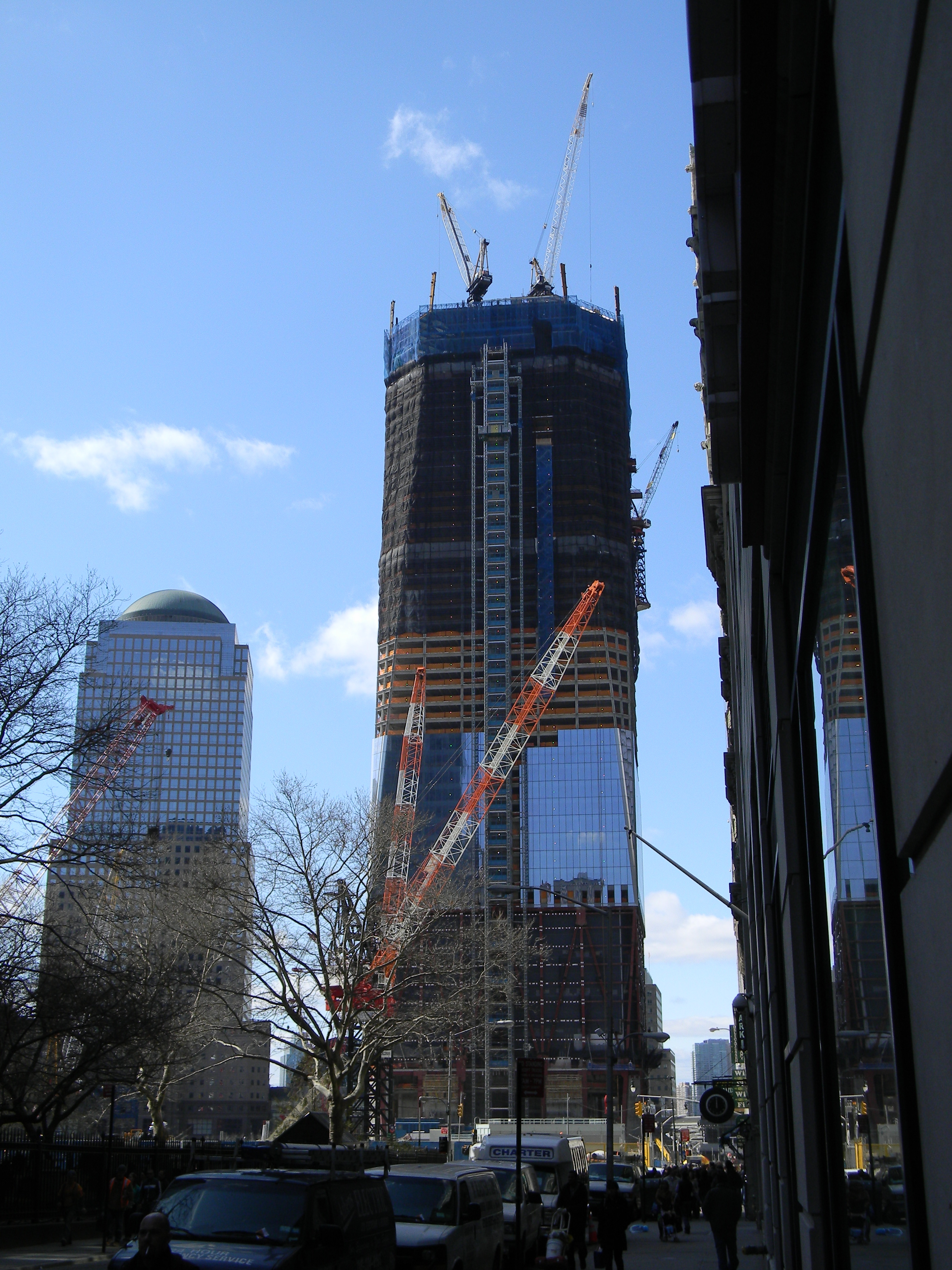
March 19, 2011, as construction reaches the 60th floor.

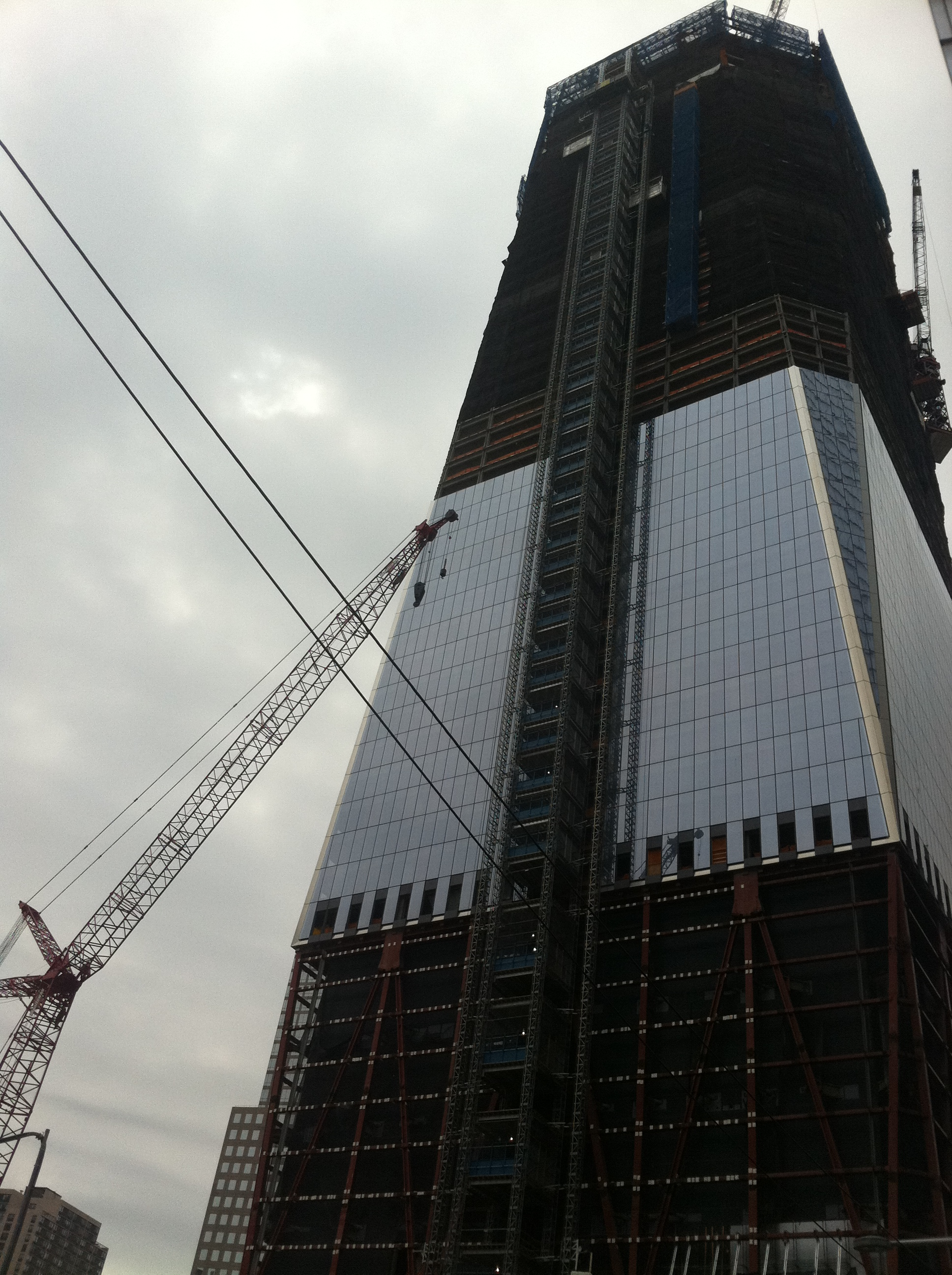
Progress as of May 2, 2011, Steel is up to the 64th floor and glass is at the 36th floor.

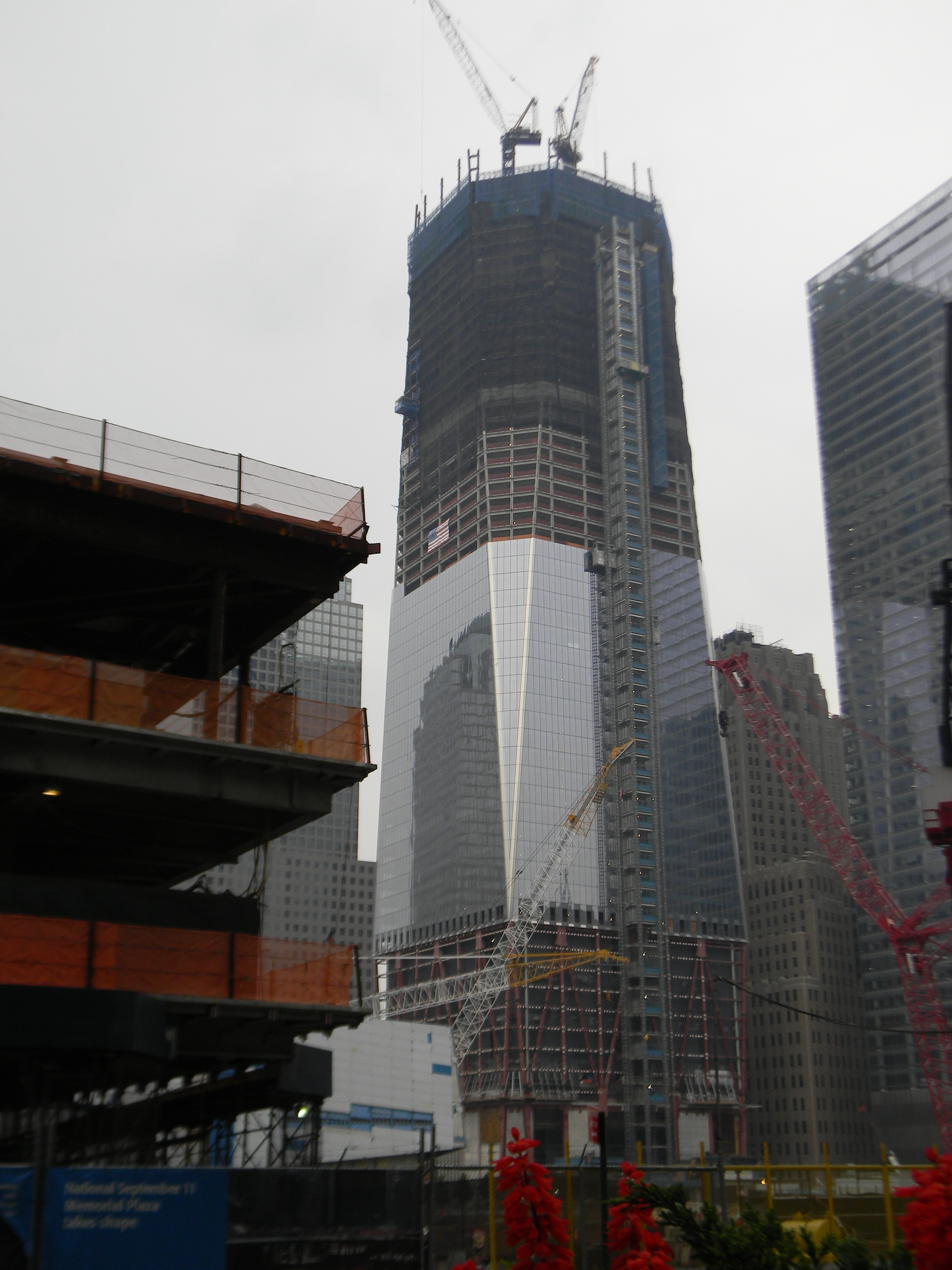
June 1, 2011.

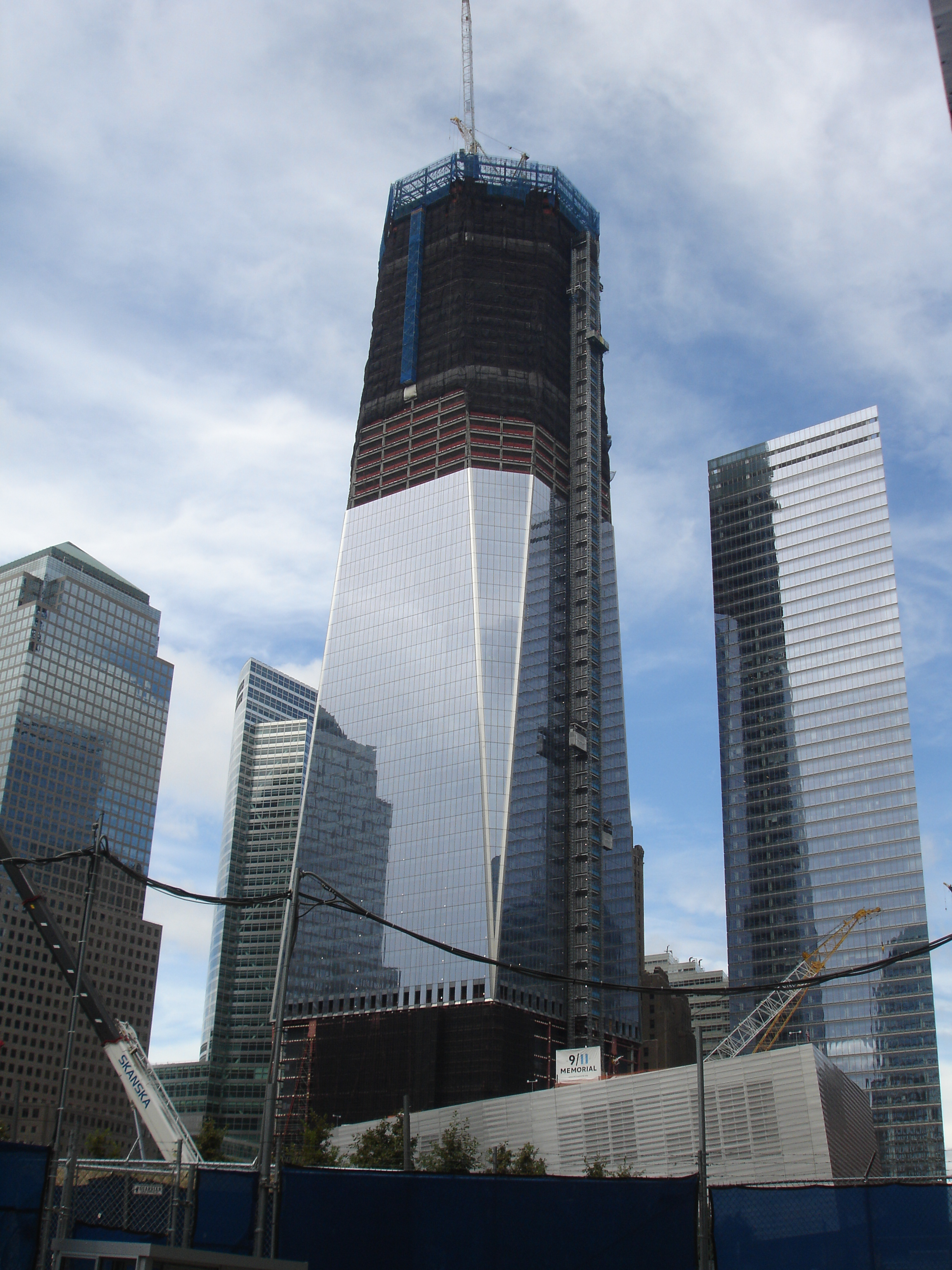
August 16, 2011.

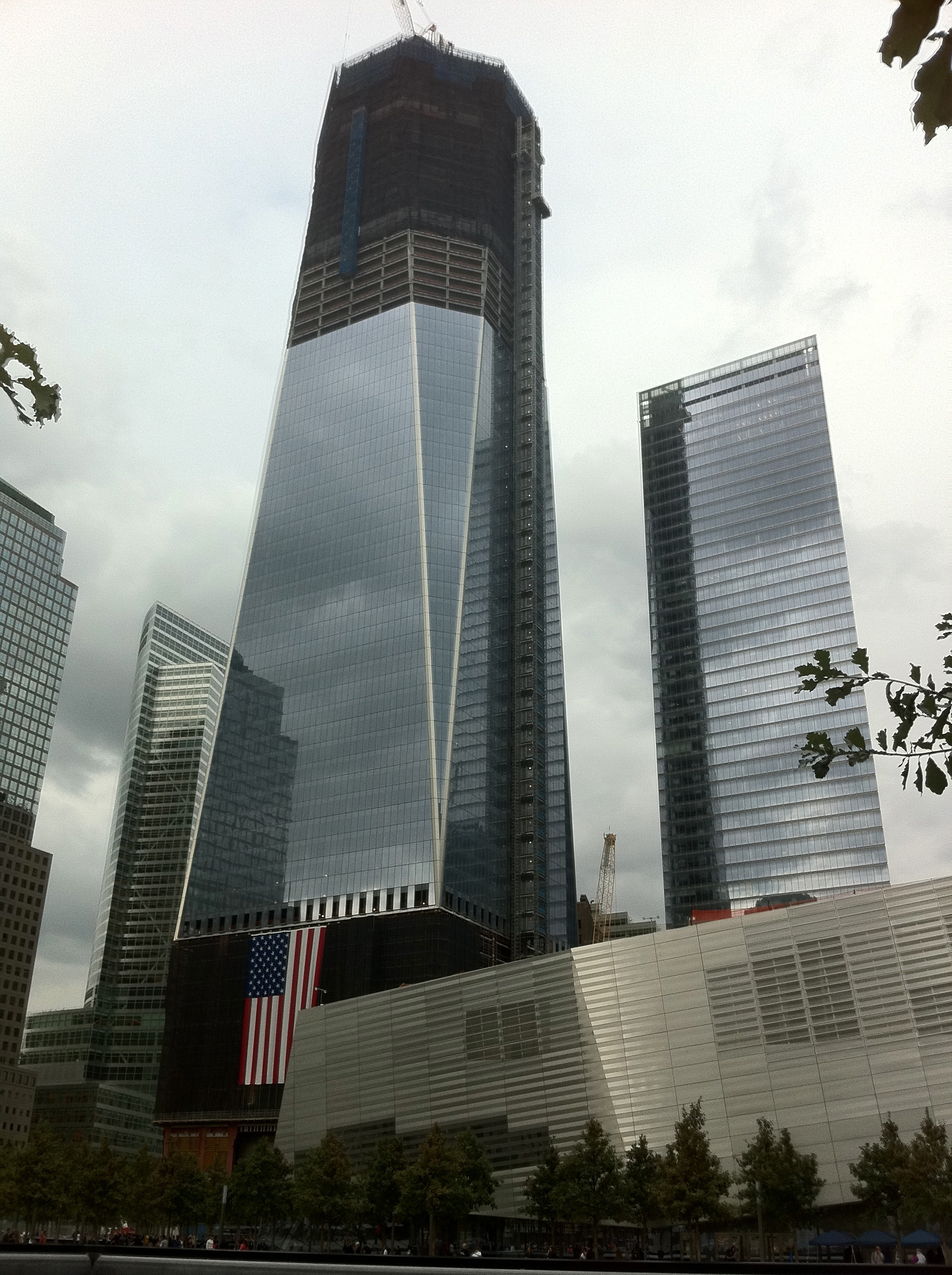
Progress as of September 17, 2011. Steel is at 83 floors, glass at 58 floors and concrete at the 72nd floor.

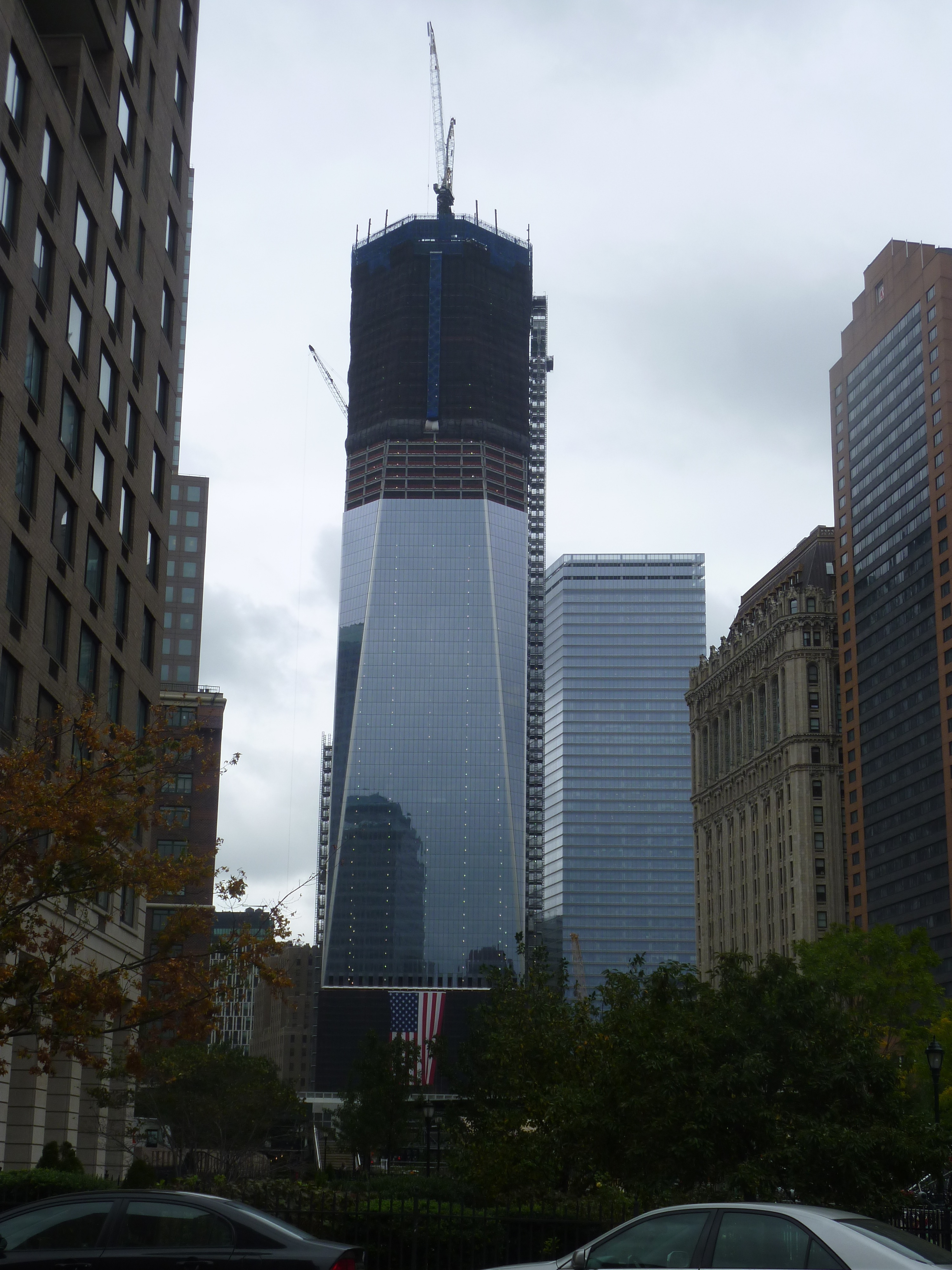
Progress as of October 13, 2011. Steel is at 86 floors, glass is at 60 floors and concrete is at 76 floors.

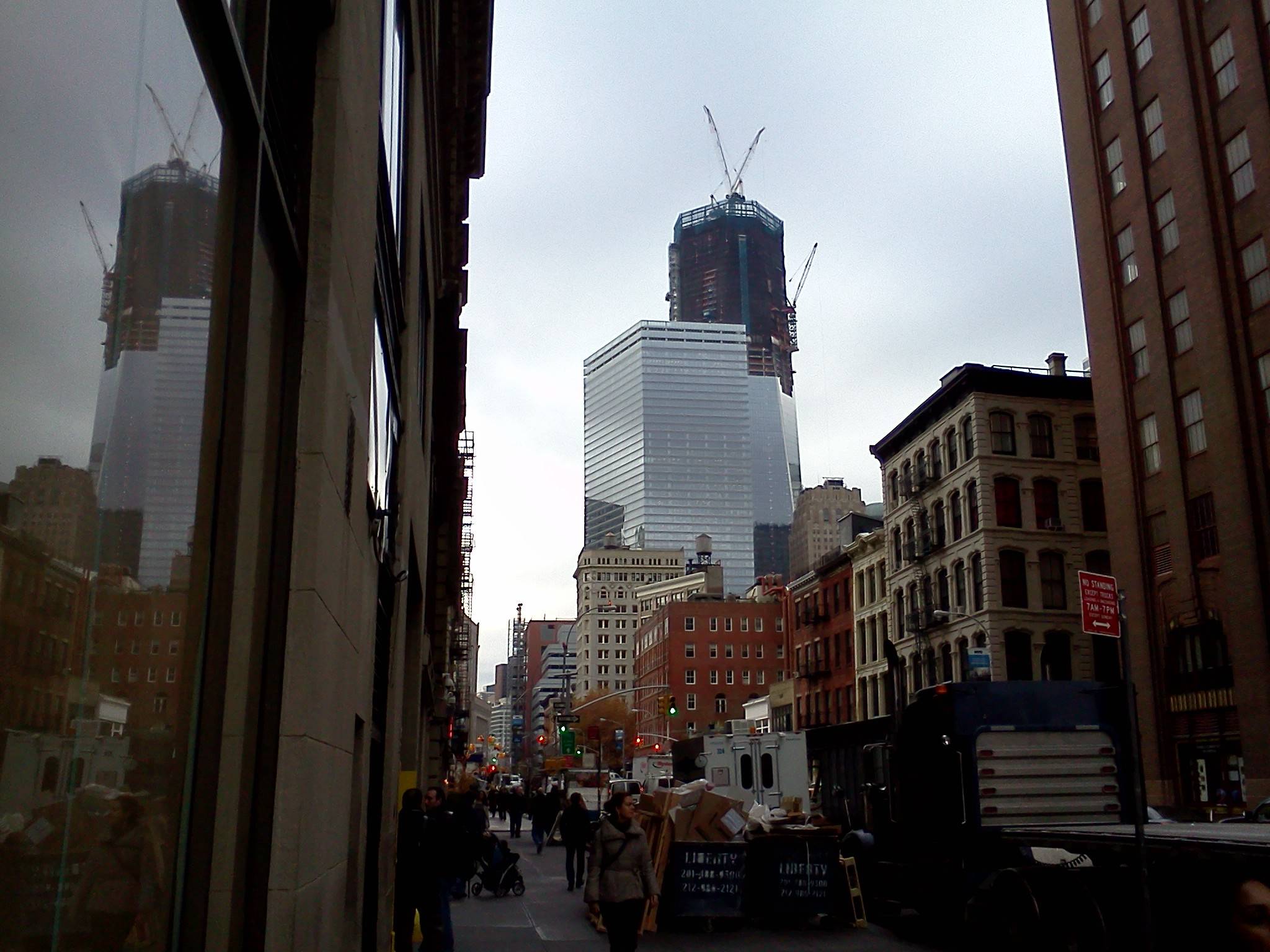
Progress as of November 15, 2011. Steel is past 89 floors, glass is at the 63rd floor, and concrete is past the 80th floor.

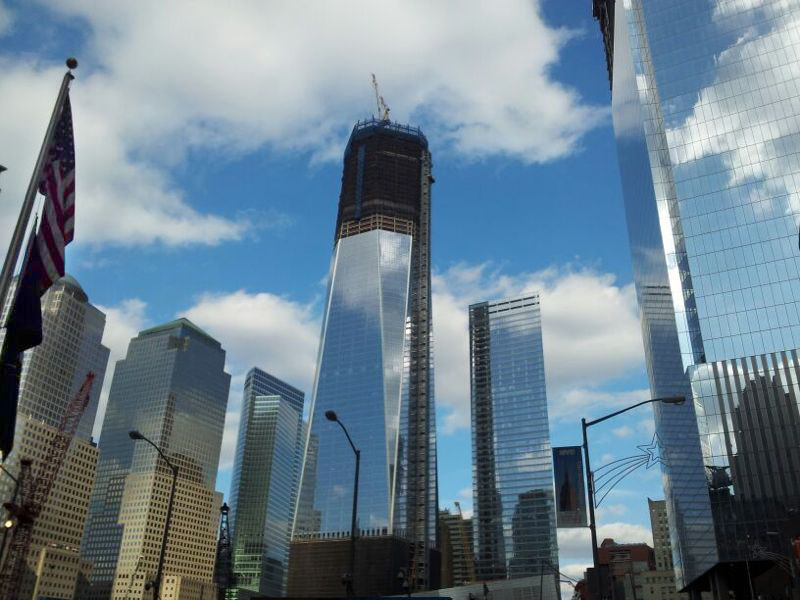
Progress as of December 23, 2011, pictured from the corner of Liberty and Greenwich Street. Steel is up to 92 floors, glass is up to 68 floors, and concrete is up to 84 floors.

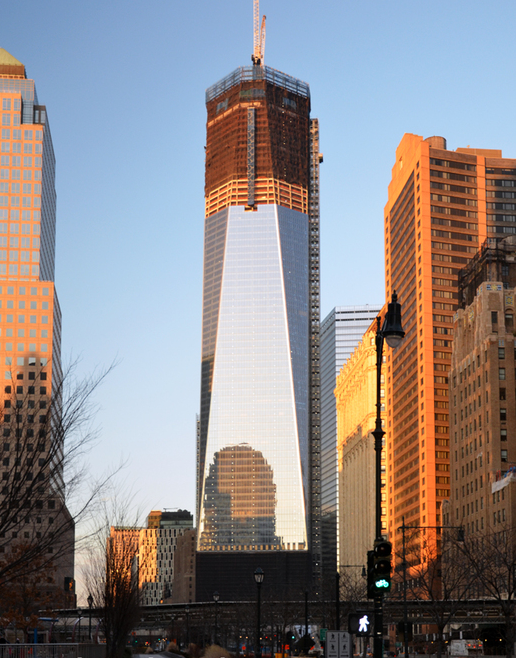
One World Trade Center on January 28, 2012.

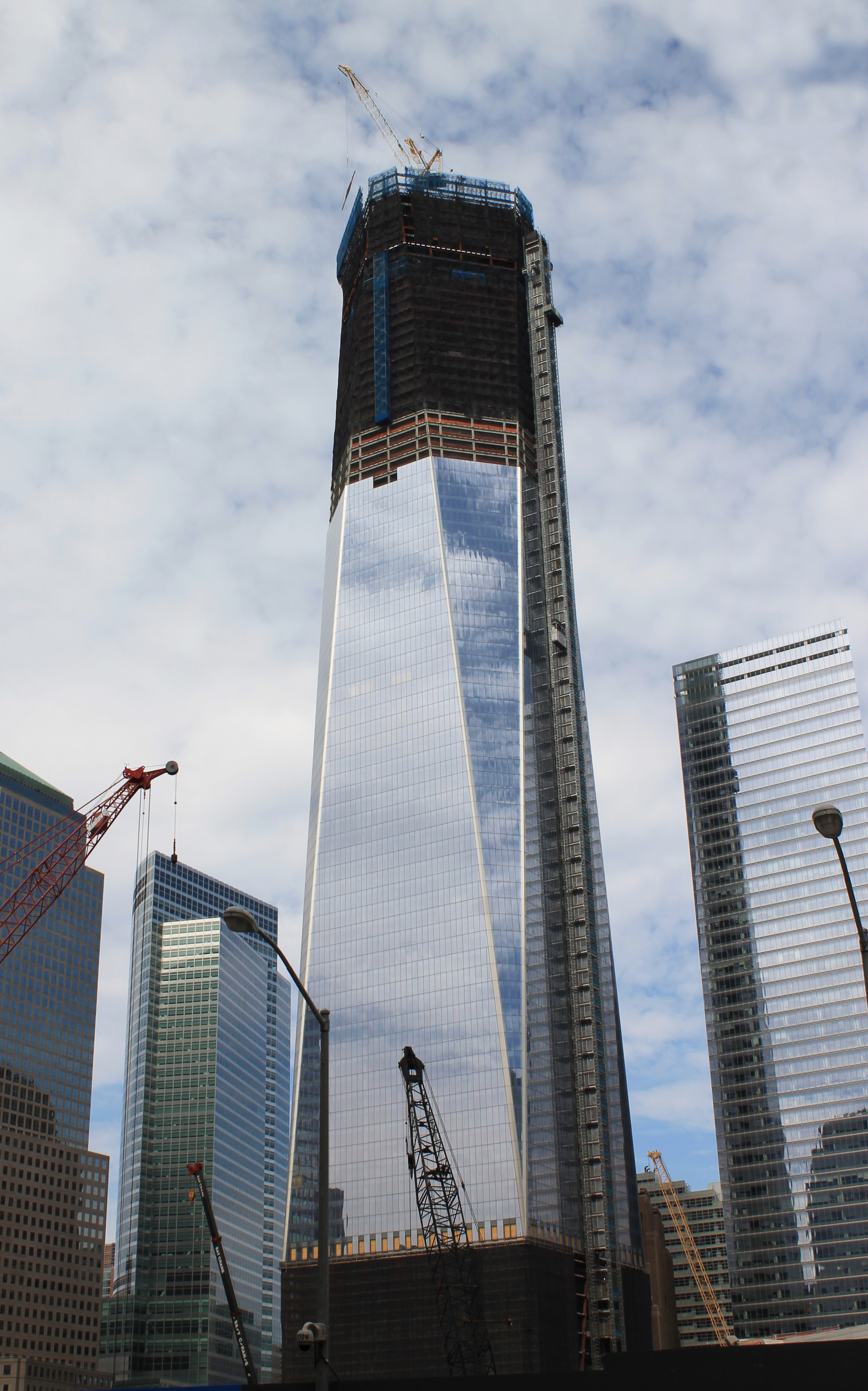
One World Trade Center on March 13, 2012.

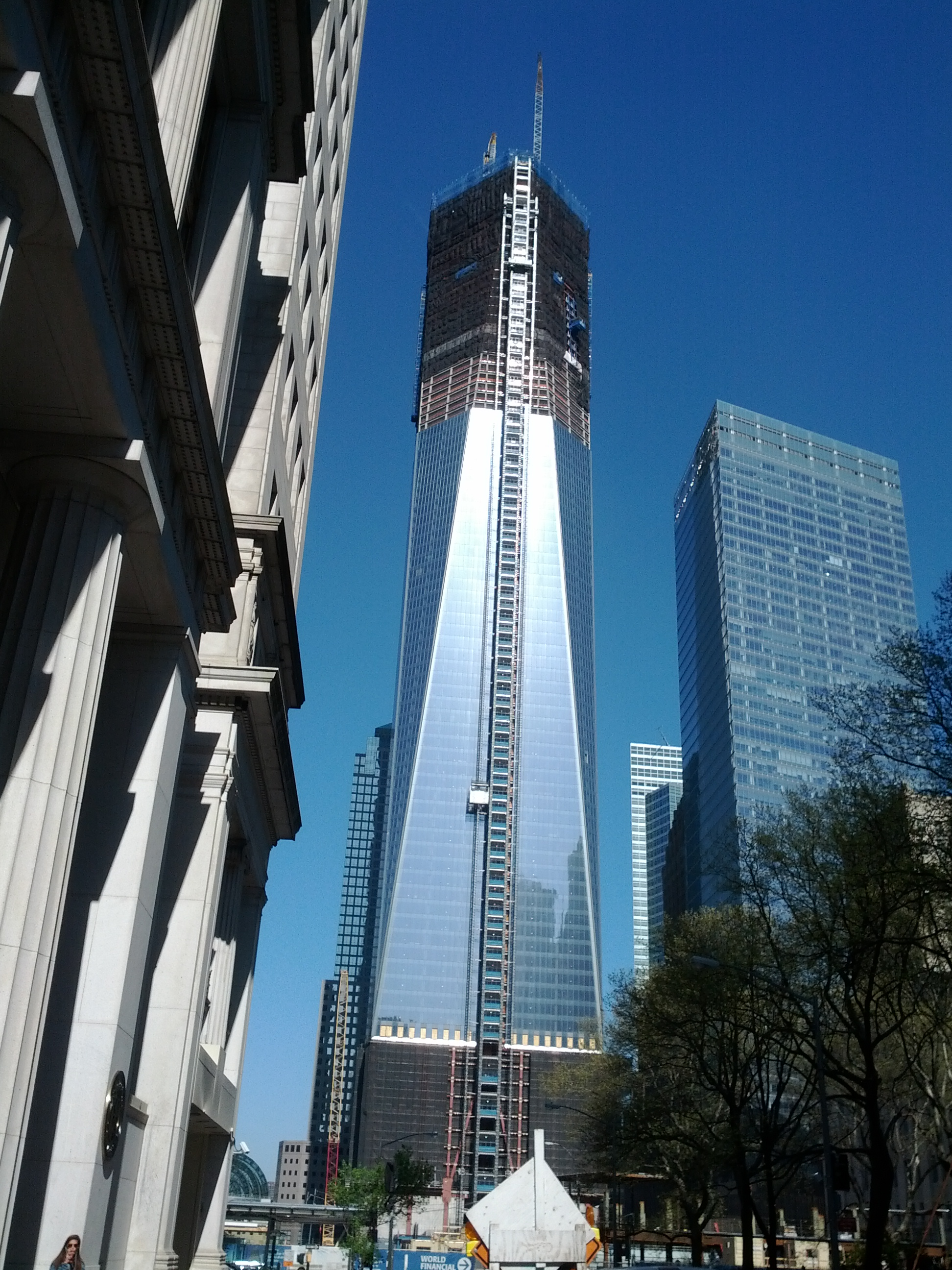
One World Trade Center on April 13, 2012. Steel is up to 100 floors, and glass is at 71.

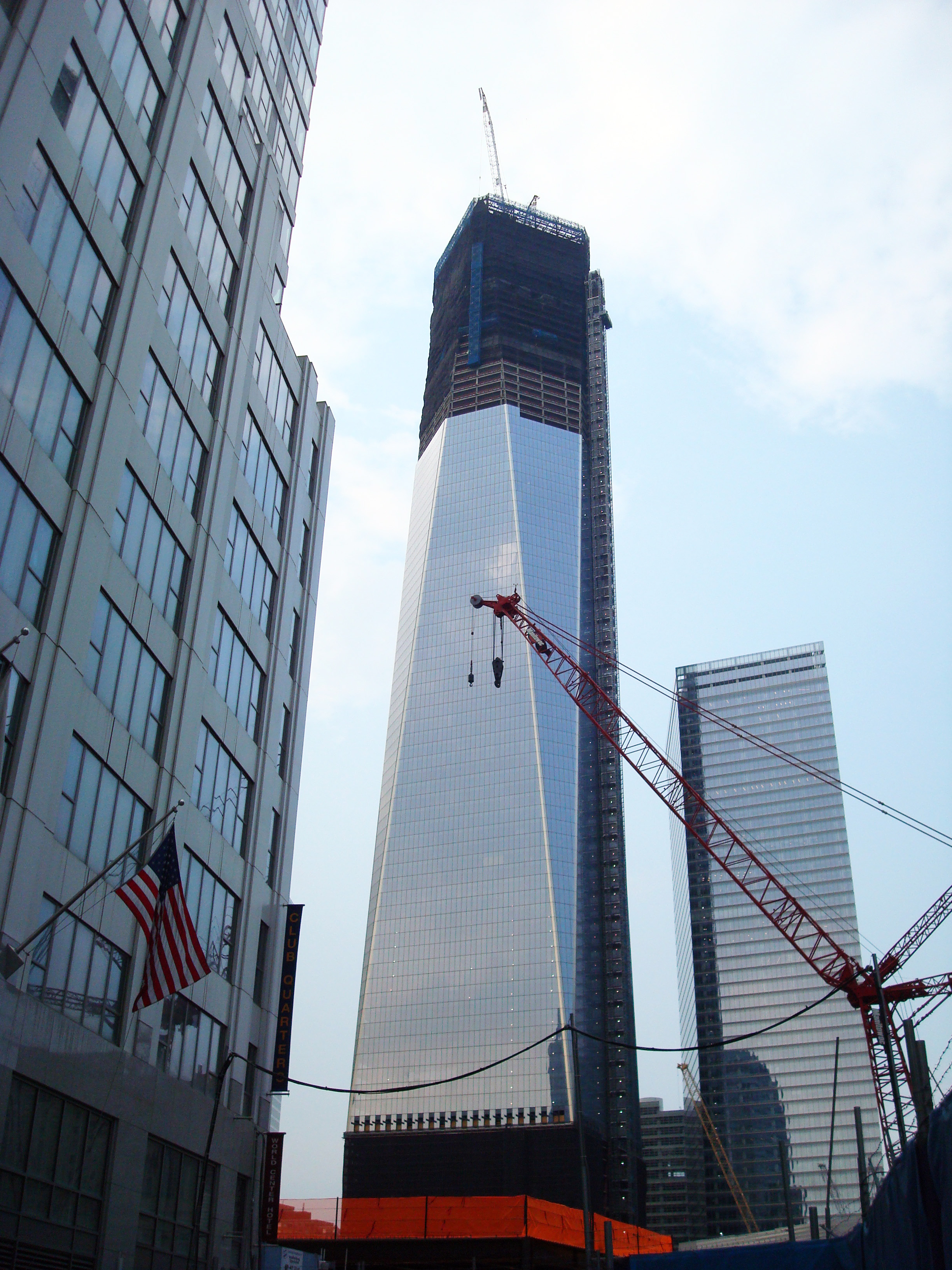
One World Trade Center as of May 27, 2012.

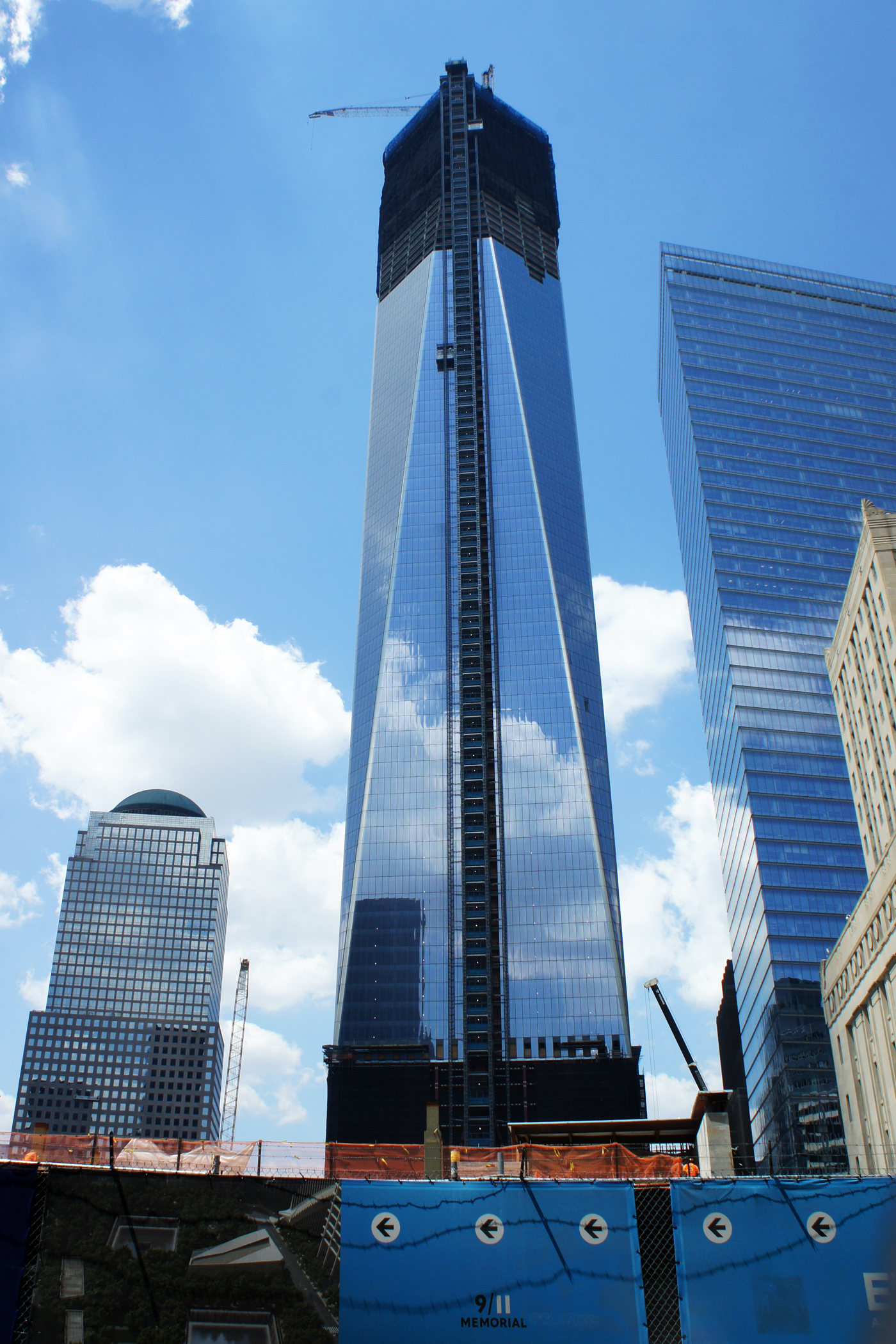
One World Trade Center under construction on July 24, 2012.

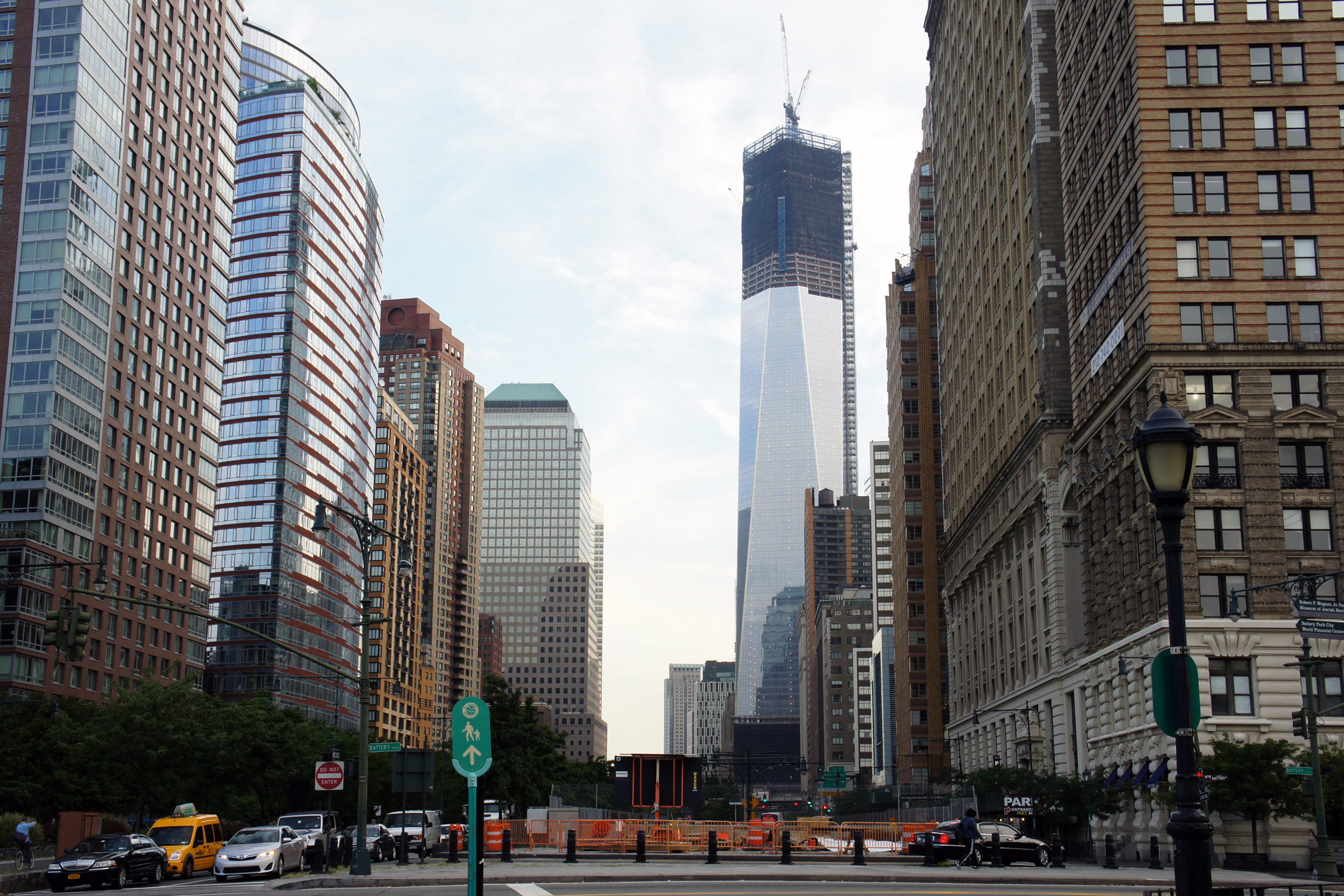
One World Trade Center on August 20, 2012.

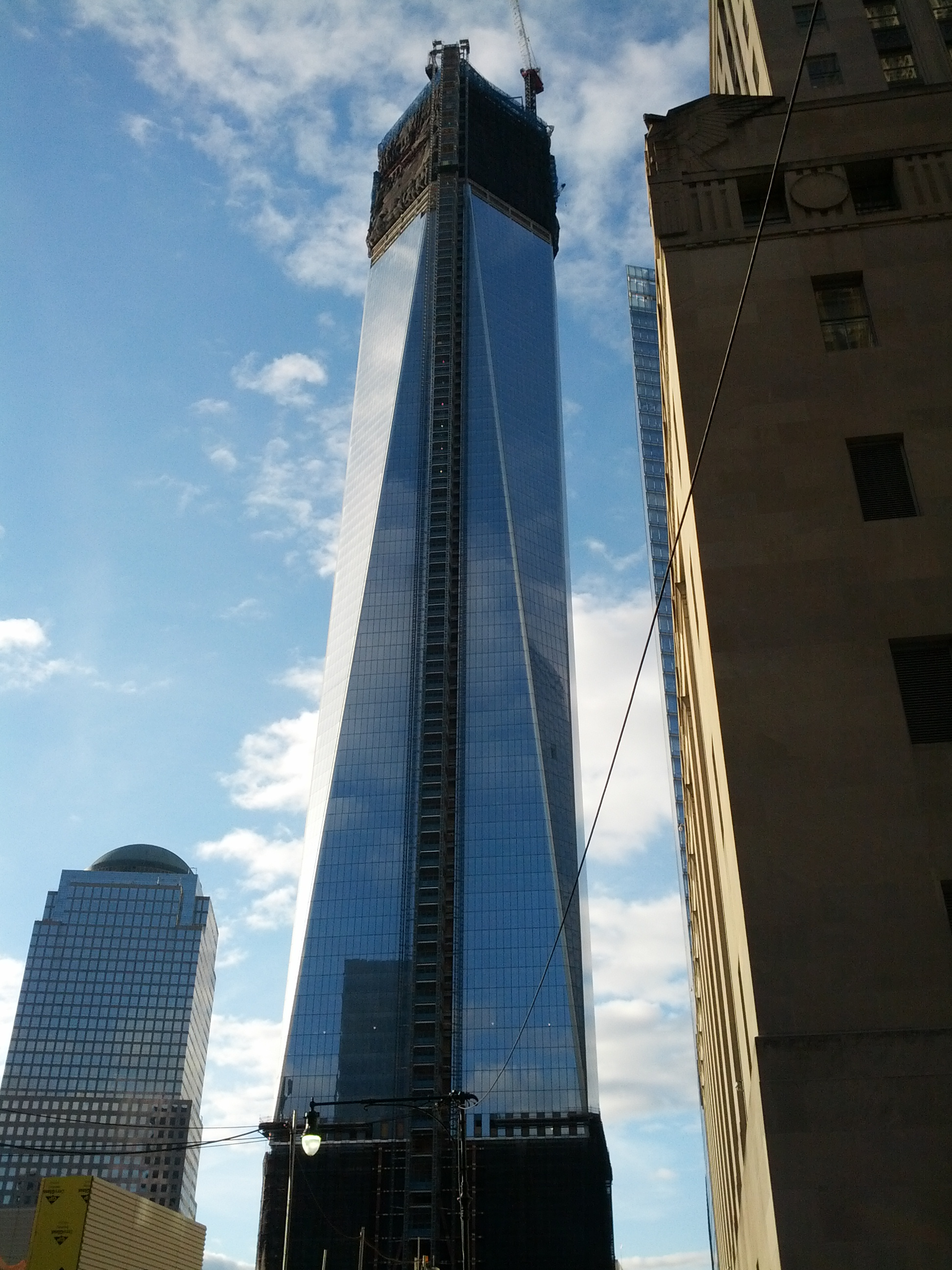
One World Trade Center on November 4, 2012.

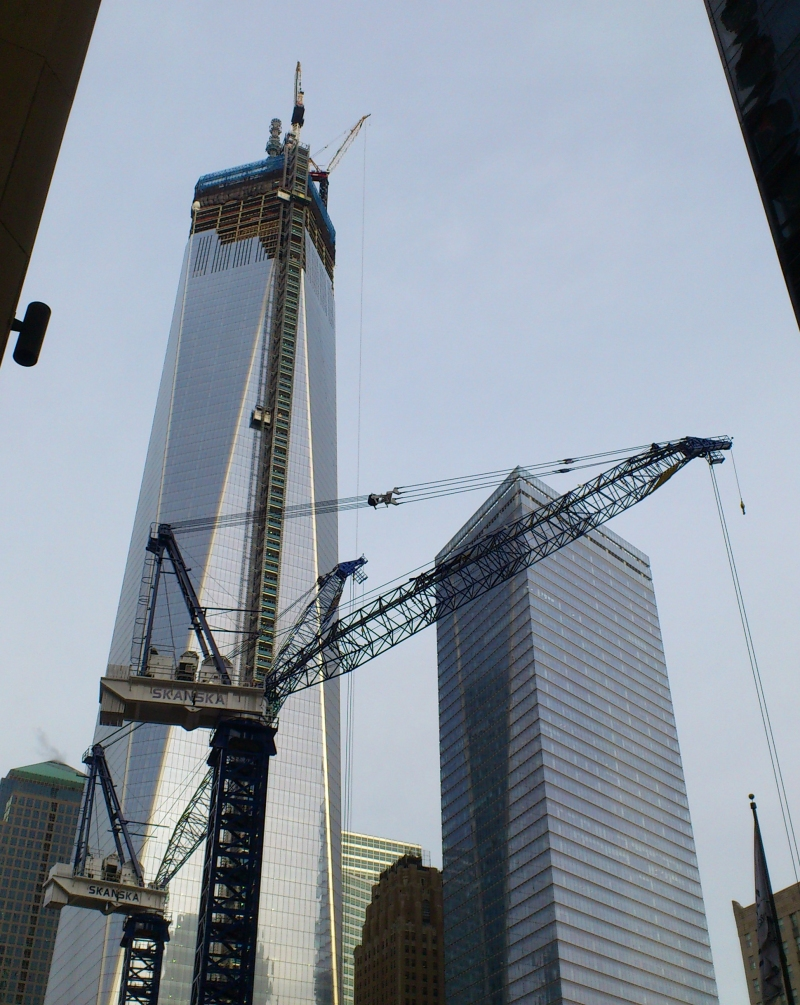
One World Trade Center on February 22, 2013. The first two sections of the spire now in place.

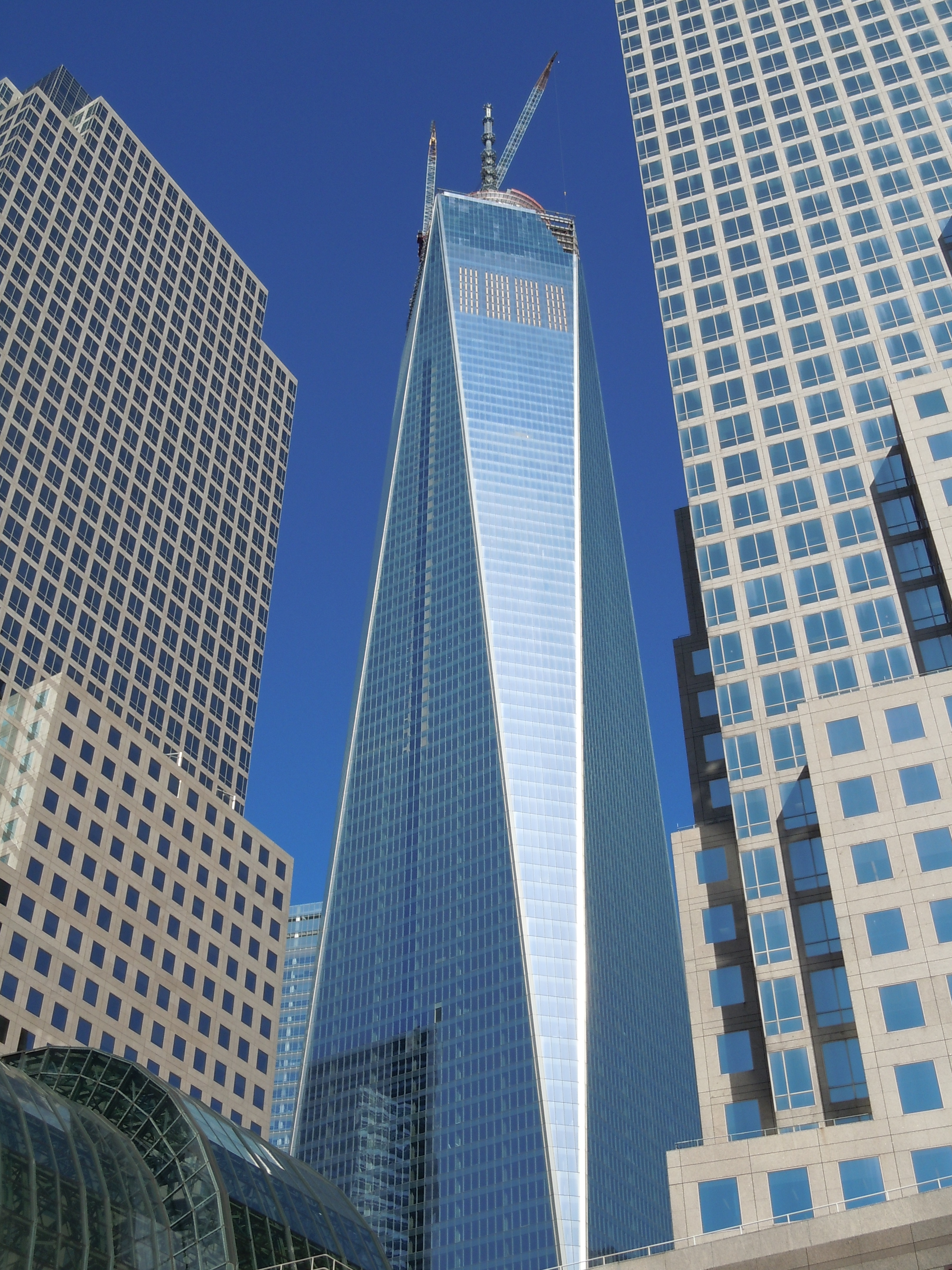
One World Trade Center on May 1, 2013. Windows now reaching the top of the building.

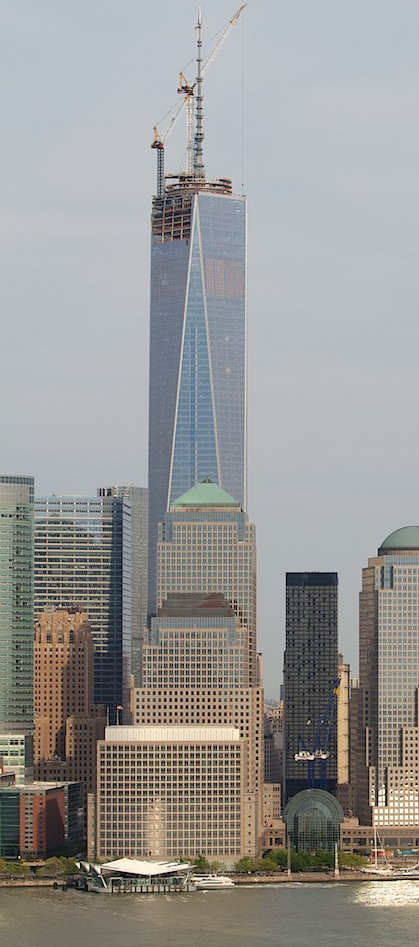
The spire beacon was installed on May 10, 2013, as seen here

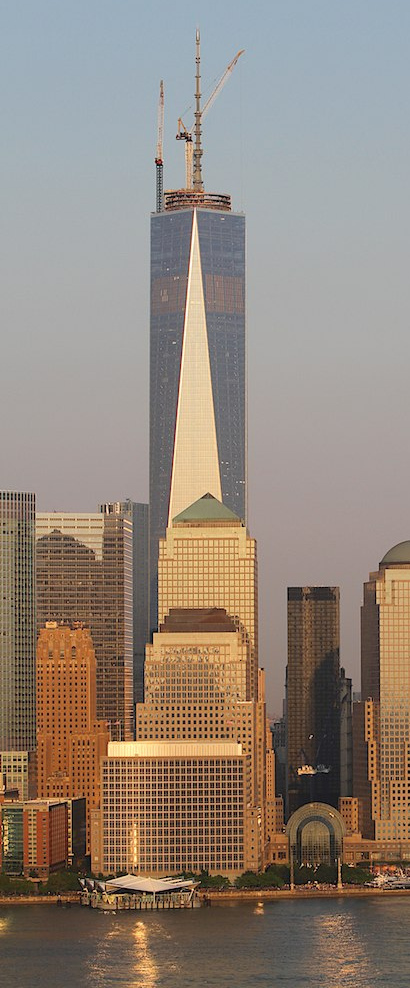
One WTC as of June 1, 2013

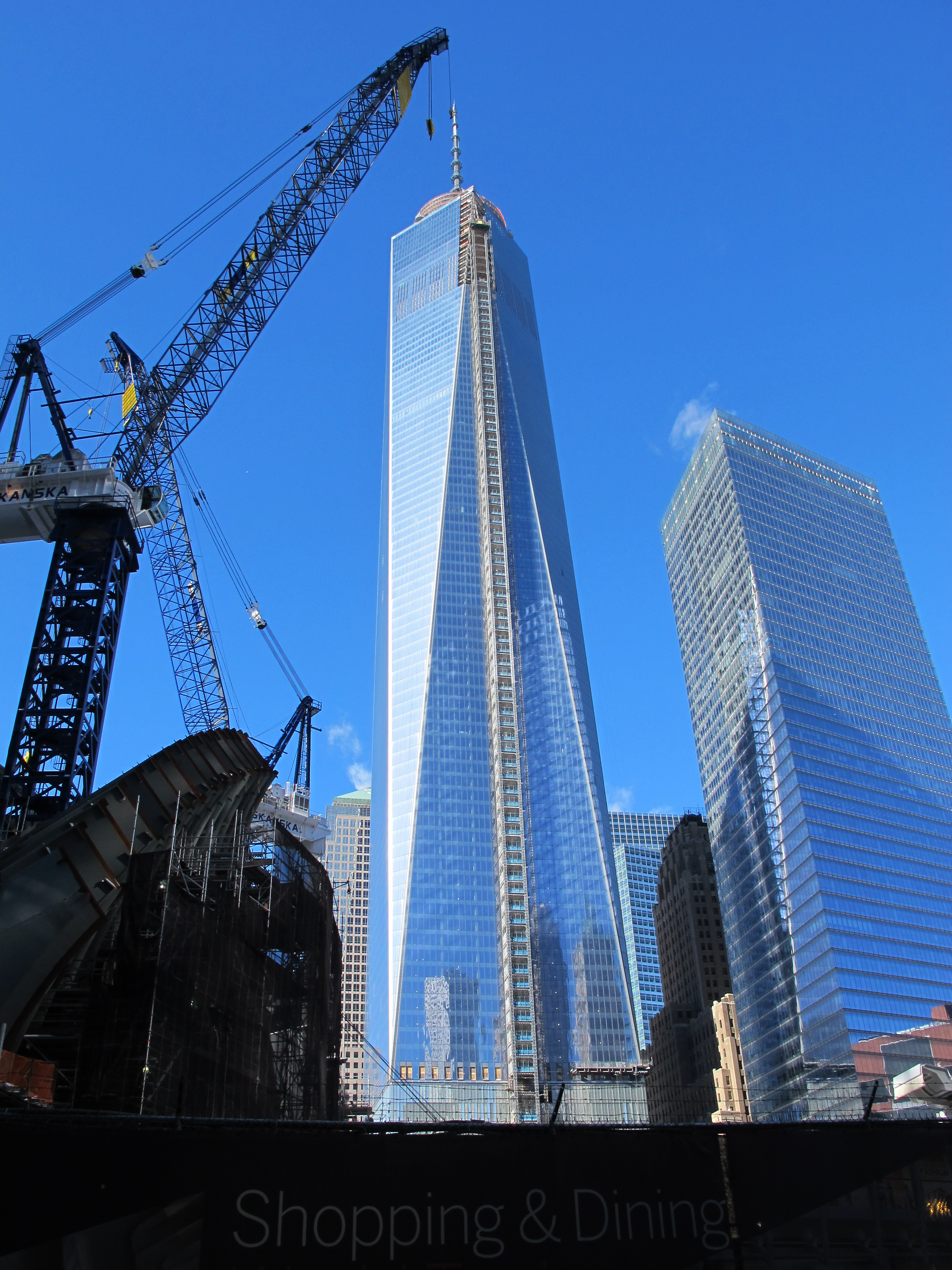
One WTC as of January 22, 2014
