= Thonk =

Thonk may refer to:

- Thonk, a 1994 album by Michael Manring
- "Thonk", a 1999 song by We
- Thonk, a band signed to Galileo Records

== See also ==
- Think (disambiguation)
- Thunk (disambiguation)
