= Think! =

Think! may refer to:

- Think! (James Brown album), 1960
- Think! (Lonnie Smith album), 1968
- "Think!" (short story), a 1977 story by Isaac Asimov
- "Think!", the Jeopardy! theme music played during the Final Jeopardy! round of the game show Jeopardy!

== See also ==
- Think (disambiguation)
