= World Trade Center (2001–present) =

Skyscraper complex in Manhattan, New York

- The complex seen in October 2026: Visible in this picture: One WTC (left tallest); 7 WTC (left);Brookfield Place (left and center); 3 WTC and 4 WTC (bottom right). Not visible in this picture: the 9/11 Memorial & Museum; construction sites of 2 WTC and 5 WTC; Liberty Park; Perelman Center; WTC Transportation Hub; and the St. Nicholas Greek Orthodox Church.

General information
- Status: Mostly complete; 2 WTC restarted construction, 5 WTC under development
- Location: New York City, New York, U.S.
- Coordinates: 40°42′42″N 74°00′45″W
- Groundbreaking: 2002
- Construction started: 1 WTC: April 27, 2006; 2 WTC: July 9, 2026; 3 WTC: March 8, 2010; 4 WTC: January 22, 2008; 5 WTC: 2011 site preparation starts.; Perelman Performing Arts Center (6 WTC): August 31, 2017; 7 WTC: May 7, 2002
- Completed: 1 WTC: November 3, 2014; 2 WTC: Construction restarted in March 2026; 3 WTC: June 11, 2018; 4 WTC: November 13, 2013; 5 WTC: Site 2027.; Perelman Performing Arts Center (6 WTC): September 13, 2023; 7 WTC: May 23, 2006; Westfield WTC Mall: August 16, 2016
- Opening: 1 WTC: November 3, 2014; 2 WTC: Estimated opening by 2031; 3 WTC: June 11, 2018; 4 WTC: November 13, 2013; 5 WTC: 2030.; Perelman Performing Arts Center (6 WTC): September 13, 2023; 7 WTC: May 23, 2006; Transportation Hub: March 3, 2016
- Owner: Port Authority of New York and New Jersey, Durst Organization
Other information
Height
Antenna spire	1 WTC: 1,792 feet (546 m)
Roof	1 WTC: 1,368 ft (417 m); 2 WTC: 1,226 ft (374 m); 3 WTC: 1,079 ft (329 m); 4 WTC: 978 ft (298 m); 7 WTC: 741 ft (226 m)
Top floor	1 WTC: 1,268 ft (386.5 m); 7 WTC: 679 ft (207 m)
Technical details
Floor count	1 WTC: 104 floors; 2 WTC: 55 floors; 3 WTC: 80 floors; 4 WTC: 78 floors; 7 WTC: 52 floors
Floor area	1 WTC: 3,501,274 ft^{2} (325,279 m^{2}); 3 WTC: 2,232,984 ft^{2} (207,451 m^{2}); 4 WTC: 2.5 million ft^{2} (232,258 m^{2}); 7 WTC: 1,681,118 ft^{2} (156,181 m^{2})
Lifts/elevators	1 WTC: 71; 3 WTC: 53; 4 WTC: 55; 7 WTC: 29
Design and construction
Main contractor	Tishman Realty & Construction Company
Website
officialworldtradecenter.com

The World Trade Center (WTC) is a complex of buildings in Lower Manhattan, New York City, replacing the original seven buildings on the same site that were destroyed during the September 11 attacks in 2001. The area is currently being redeveloped with up to six skyscrapers, four of which have been finished as of 2026; a memorial and museum is at the new plaza; which is the elevated Liberty Park adjacent to the site, containing the St. Nicholas Greek Orthodox Church and the Vehicular Security Center; the Perelman Performing Arts Center; and a transportation hub. (Note: One, 3, 4, and 7 WTC, as well as the Performing Arts Center, September 11 Memorial Museum, Liberty Park, Vehicle Security Center, and the Transportation Hub are complete. 2 and 5 WTC are under construction.) The 104-story One World Trade Center, being the tallest building in the Western Hemisphere, is the lead building for the new complex.

The buildings are among many created by the World Trade Centers Association. The original World Trade Center including the Twin Towers, were opened in 1973 and were the tallest buildings in the world at the time of their completion. They were destroyed on the morning of September 11, 2001, when al-Qaeda members hijacked two Boeing 767 jets and flew them into the towers in a coordinated act of terrorism, killing 2,753 people. The resulting collapse of the World Trade Center caused structural failure in the surrounding buildings as well. The process of cleaning up and recovery at the World Trade Center site took eight months, after which site redevelopment commenced.

After years of delay and controversy, reconstruction at the World Trade Center site started in 2004. The new complex includes One World Trade Center (nicknamed the Freedom Tower until 2009), 3 World Trade Center, 4 World Trade Center, 7 World Trade Center, and one other high-rise office building being constructed at 2 World Trade Center. The new World Trade Center complex also includes a museum and memorial, and a transportation hub building that is similar in size to Grand Central Terminal. 7 World Trade Center, which was not included in the site's master plan, opened on May 23, 2006, making it the first of the skyscrapers to have been completed in the World Trade Center complex. 4 World Trade Center, the first building completed as part of the site's master plan, opened on November 12, 2013. The National September 11 Memorial opened on September 11, 2011, while the Museum opened on May 21, 2014. One World Trade Center was opened on November 3, 2014. The World Trade Center Transportation Hub opened to the public on March 4, 2016, and 3 World Trade Center opened on June 11, 2018. 2 World Trade Center's full construction was placed on hold in 2012 and resumed in 2026, and is expected to open in 2031.

== Original complex and the September 11 attacks ==
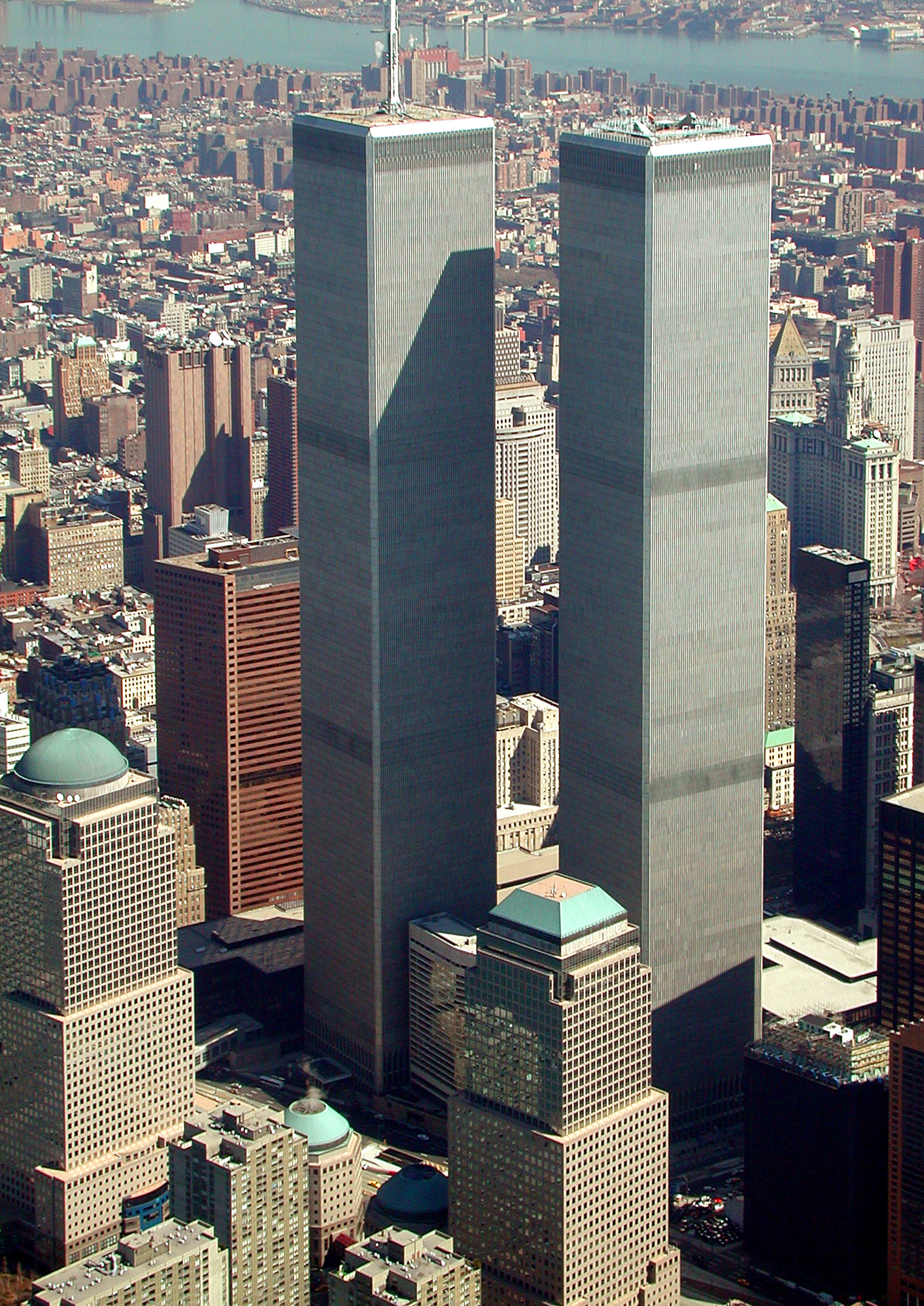
The original World Trade Center in March 2001

The original World Trade Center contained the Twin Towers (1 WTC and 2 WTC), which were the tallest buildings in the world after they opened on April 4, 1973. The other buildings in the complex included the Marriott World Trade Center (3 WTC), as well as 4 WTC, 5 WTC, 6 WTC, and 7 WTC. Despite high financial expectations for the original complex, it did not become profitable until the 1980s. On July 24, 2001, the Port Authority finalized an agreement that leased the complex to Larry Silverstein, who already owned 7 WTC. For $3.2 billion, Silverstein received the legal right to operate the complex and site for 99 years. At the time, the World Trade Center only had a few notable tenants, and Silverstein wanted to improve the complex to make it more attractive to potential tenants.

These plans for improvement were never realized. On the morning of September 11, 2001, al-Qaeda-affiliated hijackers flew two Boeing 767 jets into the Twin Towers in a coordinated act of terrorism. At 8:46 a.m. Eastern Daylight Time (EDT), a team of five hijackers intentionally crashed American Airlines Flight 11 into the northern facade of the North Tower. At 9:03 a.m. EDT, a second team of five hijackers intentionally crashed United Airlines Flight 175 into the southern facade of the South Tower. After burning for 56 minutes, the South Tower collapsed at 9:59 a.m. At 10:28 a.m., the North Tower collapsed, after burning for 102 minutes. The attacks on the World Trade Center killed 2,753 people. The resulting collapse caused structural failure in many of the surrounding buildings as well, and the entire complex was soon destroyed.

The process of cleaning up and recovery at the World Trade Center site continued 24 hours a day over a period of eight months. Debris was transported from the World Trade Center site to Fresh Kills Landfill on Staten Island, where it was further sifted. Mayor Rudy Giuliani was tasked with coordinating the cleanup and recovery effort. On May 30, 2002, a ceremony was held to officially mark the end of the cleanup efforts.

In 2002, ground was broken on construction of a new 7 World Trade Center building located just to the north of the main World Trade Center site. Since it was not part of the site master plan, the rebuilding of 7 World Trade Center was allowed to proceed without delay, but Silverstein and Con Edison recognized that the rebuilding of the tower would have to be consistent with the master plan anyway. It called for reopening several streets that had been eliminated in the original complex, so the new 7 World Trade Center was designed so Greenwich Street, which had been blocked by the original 7 World Trade Center, could be continuous through the new complex. A temporary PATH station at the World Trade Center opened in November 2003, which was replaced by a permanent station designed by Santiago Calatrava, which opened in 2016.

== Planning ==
In the months following the events of the September 11 attacks, architects and urban planning experts held meetings and forums to discuss ideas for rebuilding the site. Outgoing Mayor Giuliani advocated for a "soaring memorial" to be the only thing at the World Trade Center site during his final speech as mayor. Meanwhile, Larry Silverstein wanted to construct a new World Trade Center as soon as possible: the insurance documents for his lease on the old World Trade Center had not been finalized at the time of the attacks, so he could not receive insurance benefits from the attacks unless he rebuilt all the office space that had been destroyed. He expressed the view that “we have the right, we have the responsibility, and we have the funds”. This view took account of Wachtell Lipton’s position that Silverstein’s $3.8 billion of insurance coverage was “per occurrence”, which meant that he was in fact entitled to collect $7.6 billion of insurance, which would enable rebuilding to proceed. was entitled to George Pataki, the then-Governor of New York, controlled the Port Authority alongside the Governor of New Jersey and so was entitled to make the final decision regarding the site. He wished to balance the desires of people like Giuliani, who did not want any future development on the site, with those of people like Silverstein, who wanted a new World Trade Center as soon as possible. In January 2002, New York City art dealer Max Protetch solicited 50 concepts and renderings from artists and architects, which were put on exhibit in his art gallery in Chelsea.

With the World Trade Center site, numerous stakeholders were involved, including Silverstein and the Port Authority. In addition, the victims' families, people in the surrounding neighborhoods, and others wanted to provide input. In November 2001, Governor Pataki established the Lower Manhattan Development Corporation (LMDC) as an official commission to oversee the rebuilding process. In order to bypass the approval of the New York State Assembly, Pataki left out Sheldon Silver, the State Assemblyman for the area, from the decision-making process regarding the LMDC. The LMDC coordinated federal assistance in the rebuilding process and was tasked with working with the Port Authority, Larry Silverstein, and whoever was selected as the site's architects. The corporation also handled communication with the local community, businesses, the city of New York, and relatives of victims of the September 11 attacks. A 16-member board of directors, half appointed by the governor and half by the mayor of New York, governed the LMDC. The LMDC had questionable legal status regarding the restoration of the World Trade Center site, because the Port Authority owned most of the property and Larry Silverstein had the legal right to redevelop the World Trade Center. However, the LMDC, in an April 2002 articulation of its principles for action, asserted its role in revitalizing lower Manhattan.

In April 2002, the LMDC sent out requests for proposals to redesign the World Trade Center site to 24 Manhattan architecture firms, but then soon withdrew them. The following month, the LMDC selected Beyer Blinder Belle as planner for the redesign of the World Trade Center site. The new 7 World Trade Center, which was not part of the new plan, began construction on May 7, 2002. On July 16, 2002, Beyer Blinder Belle unveiled six concepts for redesigning the World Trade Center site. The roughly 5,000 New Yorkers that submitted feedback deemed all six designs to be "poor", so the LMDC announced a new international, open-design study. In an August 2002 press release, the LMDC announced a design study for the World Trade Center site. The following month, the LMDC, along with New York New Visions—a coalition of 21 architecture, engineering, planning, landscape architecture and design organizations—announced seven semifinalists. These architecture firms were then invited to compete to be the master plan architect for the World Trade Center: Foster and Partners (Norman Foster); Studio Daniel Libeskind (Daniel Libeskind); Meier Eisenman Gwathmey Holl (Peter Eisenman, Richard Meier, Charles Gwathmey and Steven Holl), sometimes known as "The Dream Team"; Peterson Littenberg; Skidmore, Owings & Merrill; THINK Team (Shigeru Ban, Frederic Schwartz, Ken Smith, Rafael Viñoly); and United Architects.

Preliminary site plans for the World Trade Center's reconstruction. Comparison (background: pre-9/11, blue overlay: planned rebuild).

Peterson Littenberg, a small New York architecture firm, had been enlisted by the LMDC earlier that summer as a consultant, and was invited to participate as the seventh semifinalist. The seven semifinalists presented their entries to the public on December 18, 2002, at the Winter Garden of the World Financial Center. Due to large public interest, NY1 broadcast the presentations on live TV. In the following weeks, Skidmore, Owings & Merrill withdrew its entry from the competition.

Days before the announcement of the two finalists in February 2003, Larry Silverstein wrote to LMDC Chair John Whitehead to express his disapproval of all of the semifinalists' designs. As the Twin Towers' insurance money recipient, Silverstein claimed that he had the sole right to decide what would be built. He announced that he had already picked Skidmore, Owings & Merrill as his master planner for the site. On February 1, 2003, the LMDC selected two finalists, the THINK Team and Studio Daniel Libeskind, and planned on picking a single winner by the end of the month. Rafael Viñoly of the THINK Team and Studio Daniel Libeskind presented their designs to the LMDC, which selected the former design. Earlier the same day, however, Roland Betts, a member of the LMDC, had called a meeting and the corporation had agreed to vote for the THINK design before hearing the final presentations. Governor Pataki, who had originally commissioned the LMDC, intervened and overruled the LMDC's decision. On February 27, 2003, Studio Daniel Libeskind officially won the competition to be the master planner for the World Trade Center redesign.

Libeskind's original proposal, titled Memory Foundations, underwent extensive revisions during collaboration with Larry Silverstein as well as from Skidmore, Owings & Merrill, whom Silverstein hired. The plan was anchored by the 1,776-foot (541 m) One World Trade Center and featured a memorial and a number of other office towers. Out of the World Trade Center Site Memorial Competition, a design by Michael Arad and Peter Walker titled Reflecting Absence was selected in January 2004.

Though Libeskind designed the site, the individual buildings have been designed by different architects. While not all of Libeskind's ideas were incorporated into the final design, his design and the public support it garnered solidified the principle that the original footprints of the Twin Towers should be turned into a memorial and not be used for commercial purposes. As a result, Silverstein’s lawyers at the New York firm of Wachtell Lipton embarked on the multi-year negotiation process to frame a master plan for the rebuilding. The first step in this process, completed in 2003, was the "swap" in which Silverstein gave up his rights to the footprints of the Twin Towers so that they could become a memorial, and in exchange received the right to build five new office towers around the memorial. The "swap" and the ensuing negotiations, which lasted for many years, have been referred to as the most complex real estate transaction in human history because of the complexity of the issues involved, the many stakeholders, and the difficulty of reaching consensus. A key factor in enabling rebuilding to proceed was the effective formation of a public-private partnership between Silverstein and the Port Authority, which aligned incentives and allocated responsibility among the stakeholders.

The 2006 master plan, incorporating designs from David Childs, Norman Foster and Richard Rogers

=== Disputes ===
There was much debate regarding the future of Ground Zero following the destruction of the World Trade Center. Disagreement and controversy regarding who owned the property and what would be built there hindered construction at the site for several years. Many wanted the World Trade Center to be rebuilt as it was before 9/11 according to a poll by Marist College. The Twin Towers II proposal, which was to rebuild the original towers at a taller height, was led by an informal organization called the Twin Towers Alliance. Others did not want anything built there at all or wanted the entire site to become a memorial. Finally, a master plan was agreed upon, which would feature a memorial and museum where the original Twin Towers stood and six new skyscrapers surrounding it.

The North Tower of the old World Trade Center featured a complex of venues on the 106th and 107th floors called Windows on the World; these were tourist attractions in their own right, and a social gathering spot for people who worked in the towers. This restaurant also housed one of the most prestigious wine schools in the United States, called "Windows on the World Wine School", run by wine personality Kevin Zraly. Despite numerous assurances that these local landmarks and global attractions would be rebuilt, the Port Authority scrapped plans to rebuild these WTC attractions, which has outraged some observers.

An episode of CBS's 60 Minutes in 2010 focused on the lack of progress at Ground Zero, particularly on the lack of completion dates for a majority of the buildings, the main tower, One World Trade Center's having undergone three different designs, and the delays and monetary expense involved. Investor Larry Silverstein said the Port Authority's estimated completion date for the entire site was 2037, thirty-five years after work started. Although billions of dollars had already been spent on the project, he said Ground Zero "is still a hole in the ground". During an interview for the episode, Larry Silverstein said: "I am the most frustrated person in the world....I'm seventy-eight years of age; I want to see this thing done in my lifetime".

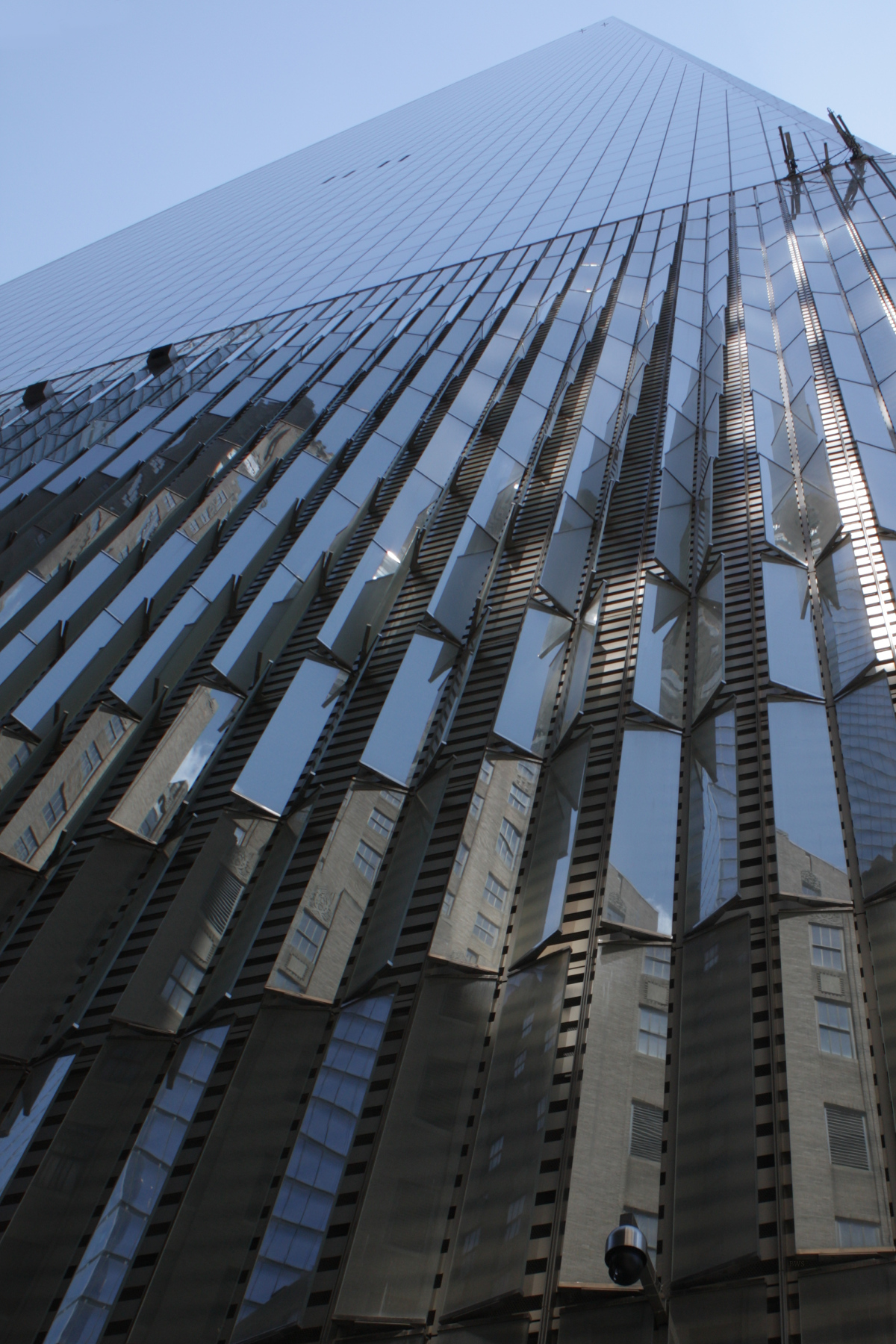
Louvered glass panels over base floors, 2019

One World Trade Center itself was met with criticism early in its planning and construction stages. The original design, which was asymmetrical, significantly shorter, and called for an off-center spire, was met with much disapproval, causing a new one to be devised. A key feature of the final design, the fortified, windowless base, was also denounced as looking dreary and unwelcoming. To alleviate this problem, the designers decided to clad it with prismatic glass panels but sample panels bowed and broke during testing. A more typical construction glass, mounted on louvered ventilation panels, was installed instead. The name change from Freedom Tower to One World Trade Center was met with some criticism. The then-Governor of New York, George Pataki, stated in 2003 that "[t]he Freedom Tower isn't going to be One World Trade Center, it's going to be the Freedom Tower."

== Rebuilding ==
=== Early construction and final planning ===
The design for the World Trade Center was finalized in 2005, but was revised extensively after the NYPD raised security concerns regarding various sites in the complex, which delayed the start of the construction of the entire complex by two years. The new plans for the World Trade Center Transportation Hub, which involved doubling the number of support columns, pushed back the construction timeline. In the original plan, the construction of the National September 11 Memorial & Museum would have begun after the Transportation Hub had been completed because the roof of the Transportation Hub provided the foundation on which the memorial and the walls of the museum rested. Due to the two-year delay and pressure by the victims' families to have the memorial completed by the 10-year anniversary, it was decided to concentrate on building the memorial and holding off construction of the transportation hub, which increased costs to an estimated $3.4 billion. A performing arts center was also announced that year.

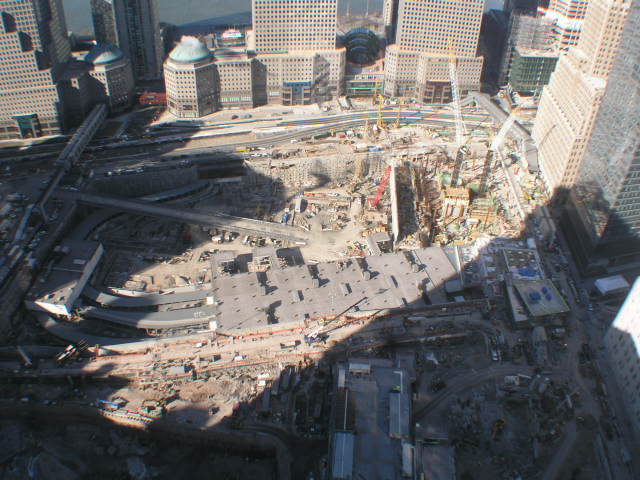
Construction of the September 11 Memorial complex in January 2008

In 2006, the Port Authority took over One World Trade Center's ownership from Silverstein Properties. The project's developer Tishman Construction Corporation was the construction manager at the time. On March 13, 2006, workers arrived at the World Trade Center site to remove remaining debris and start surveying work. This marked the official start of construction of the National September 11 Memorial & Museum, though not without controversy and concerns from some family members. In April 2006, the Port Authority and Larry Silverstein reached an agreement in which Silverstein ceded rights to develop Towers One and Five in exchange for financing with Liberty Bonds for Towers Two, Three, and Four. On April 27, 2006, a ground-breaking ceremony was held for the Freedom Tower. The building was designed to be 1,368 feet (417 m) tall, the height of the original World Trade Center north tower, and its spire rises to the symbolic height of 1,776 feet (541 m), a reference to the year in which the United States Declaration of Independence was signed.

In May 2006, architects Richard Rogers and Fumihiko Maki were announced as the architects for 3 and 4 WTC, respectively, with AAI Architects, P.C. as the architect of record for both. The final designs for 2, 3, and 4 WTC were unveiled on September 7, 2006. Tower Two, or 200 Greenwich Street, was slated to have a roof height of 1,254 feet (382 m) and a 96-foot (29 m) tripod spire for a total of 1,350 feet (410 m). 3 WTC, at 175 Greenwich Street, was to have a roof height of 1,155 feet (352 m) and a spire height reaching 1,255 feet (383 m). 4 WTC, at 150 Greenwich Street, would have an overall height of 946 feet (288 m). The new 7 World Trade Center opened on May 23, 2006, the first tower in the complex to reopen. This had been considered a priority since restoring Con Edison's electrical substation in the building's lower floors was necessary to meet power demands of Lower Manhattan.

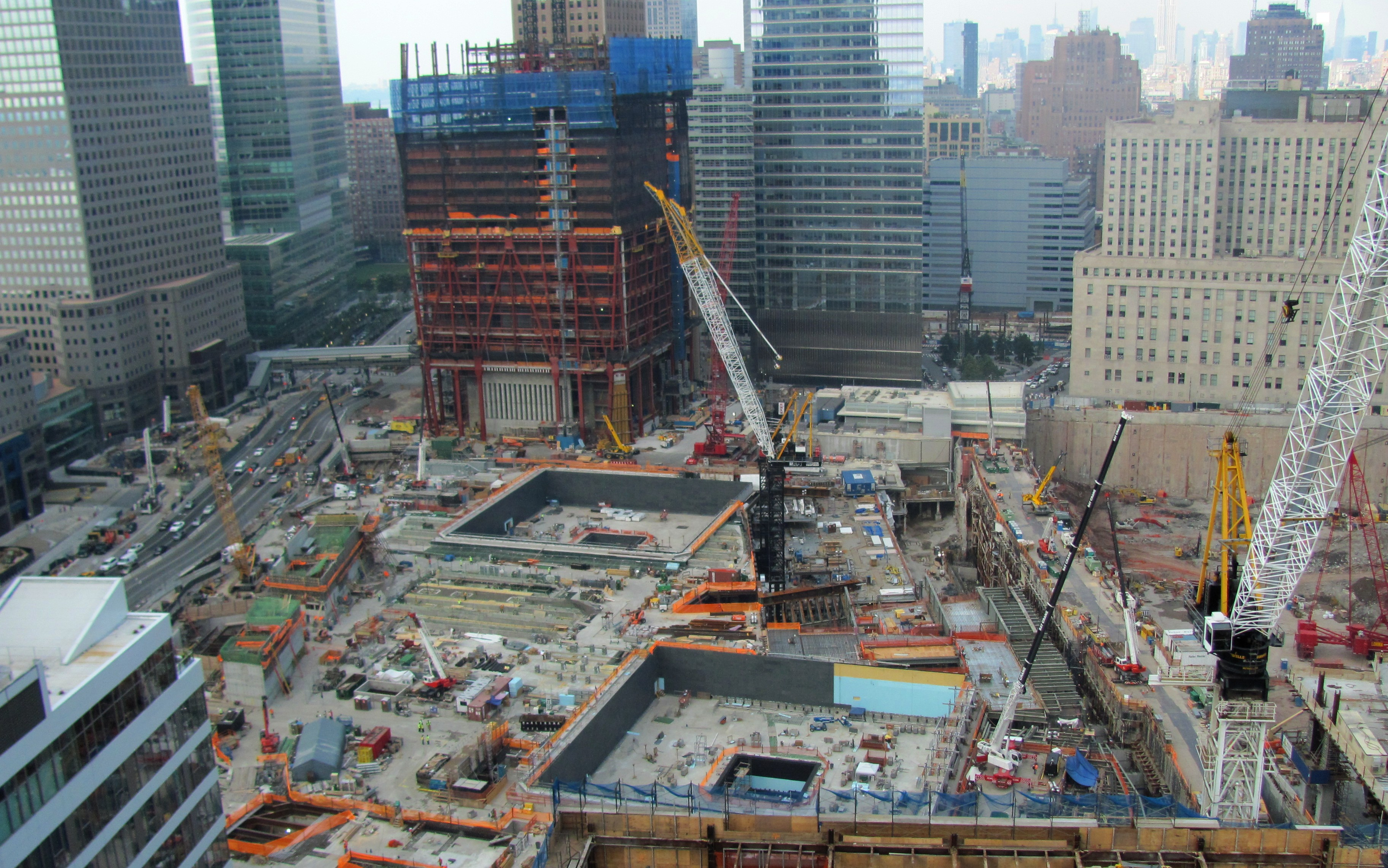
The World Trade Center site in July 2010

On June 22, 2007, the Port Authority announced that JPMorgan Chase would build 5 WTC, a 42-story building that was occupied by the Deutsche Bank Building at the time. Kohn Pedersen Fox was selected as the architect for the building. Four renowned architects—including Spanish architect Santiago Calatrava, who designed the transit hub; One WTC designer David Childs of Skidmore, Owings and Merrill; and the British architect Norman Foster of Foster and Partners, who designed Tower Two and masterminded the diamond design—would greatly enhance the street-level atmosphere of the rebuilt site. However, JPMorgan's March 2008 acquisition of Bear Stearns caused construction on 5 WTC to stagnate, as the company changed its plans and relocated its headquarters to 383 Madison Avenue.

Groundbreaking for 3 WTC occurred in fall 2008, and in May 2009, the Port Authority proposed reducing the tower to four stories. Work continued on One WTC, but digging the foundation and installing tower-foundation steel columns, concrete, and rebar for that tower took twice as long as it normally would due to the existence of the subway line under West Broadway nearby. The One WTC building reached grade level by 2010. From there, it progressed at a pace of one floor a week, Publisher Condé Nast agreed to move its headquarters to One World Trade Center in 2010, and with this shift, many more tenants were expected to move to the building.

The St. Nicholas Greek Orthodox Church, which was destroyed during the 2001 attacks, was originally supposed to be relocated from the site, and on July 23, 2008, the Port Authority reached a deal with the leaders of the church for the Port Authority to acquire the 1,200-square-foot (110 m^{2}) lot that the church occupied for $20 million, and relocate the church. Officials reneged in 2009, leading the Greek Orthodox Diocese of America to sue the Port Authority for failing to rebuild the church. On October 14, 2011, an agreement for the reconstruction of the church was signed that ended all legal action.

=== Significant progress ===
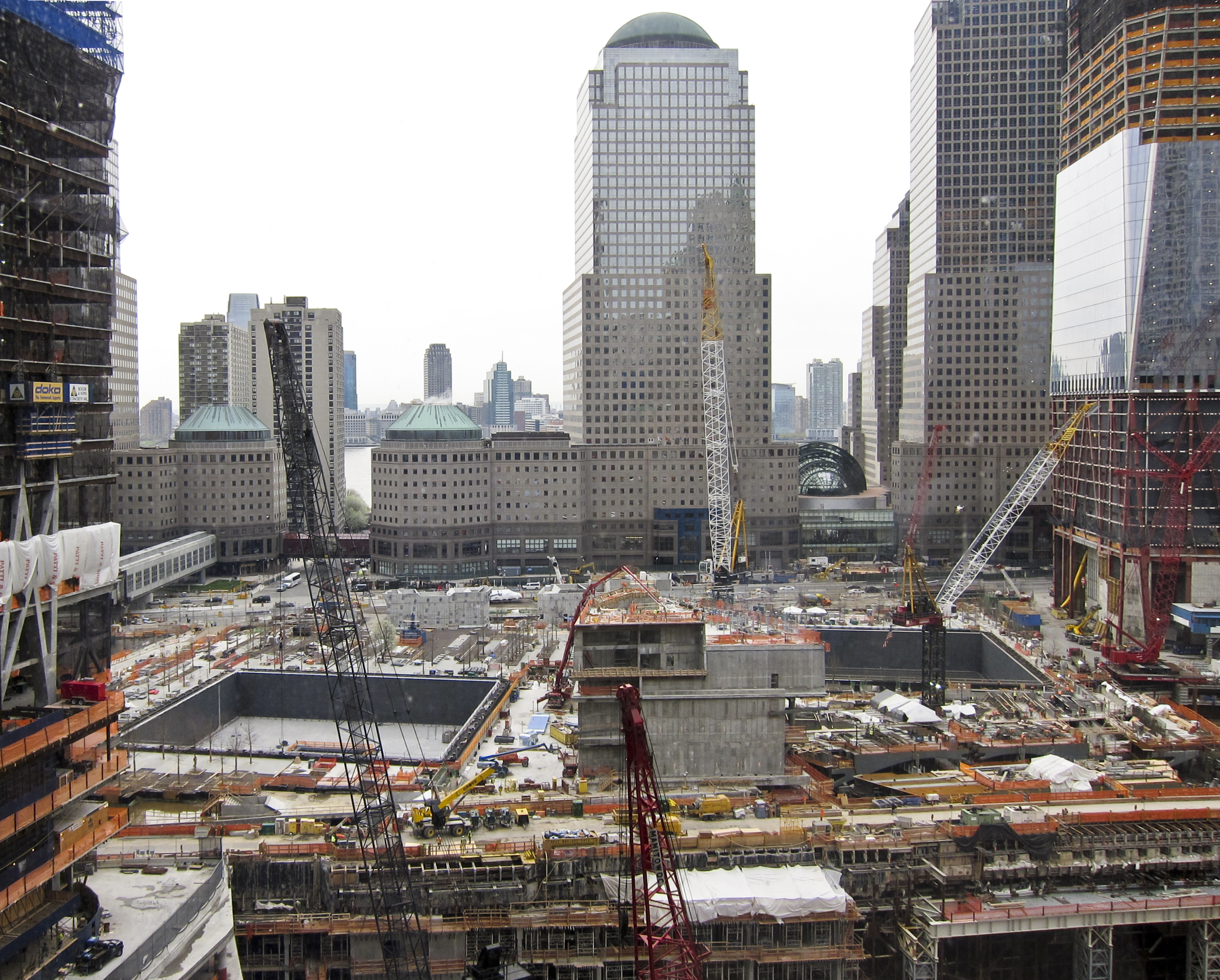
Rebuilding progress in April 2011, looking west from the transportation hub's site

By August 2011, One World Trade Center was at 80 stories with glass up to the 54th floor, Tower Four was up around 38 stories with glass up to the 15th floor, and the former Deutsche Bank Building had been completely dismantled, and the Port Authority was working on their Vehicle Security Center. The memorial officially opened to relatives of the deceased on September 11, 2011, and to the general public on September 12. Construction on 5 WTC's foundation also began in September 2011. By December 2011, 2 WTC's foundations were finished and assembly of the frame was started. Because numerous American and Chinese companies were "very interested" in leasing space at the complex, 2 WTC was likely to be finished earlier than expected.

In January 2012, with Silverstein still unable to find tenants for 4 WTC, construction on the above-ground levels was delayed indefinitely, with plans for only 7 stories. Meanwhile, One World Trade Center topped out in August 2012, and its spire was then shipped from Quebec to New York, with the first section of the spire being hoisted to the top of the tower on December 12, 2012. The September 11 Museum was supposed to open that year. However, construction was halted in December 2011 to September 2012 due to cost disputes, and further delays were caused when Hurricane Sandy significantly damaged the site in November 2012.

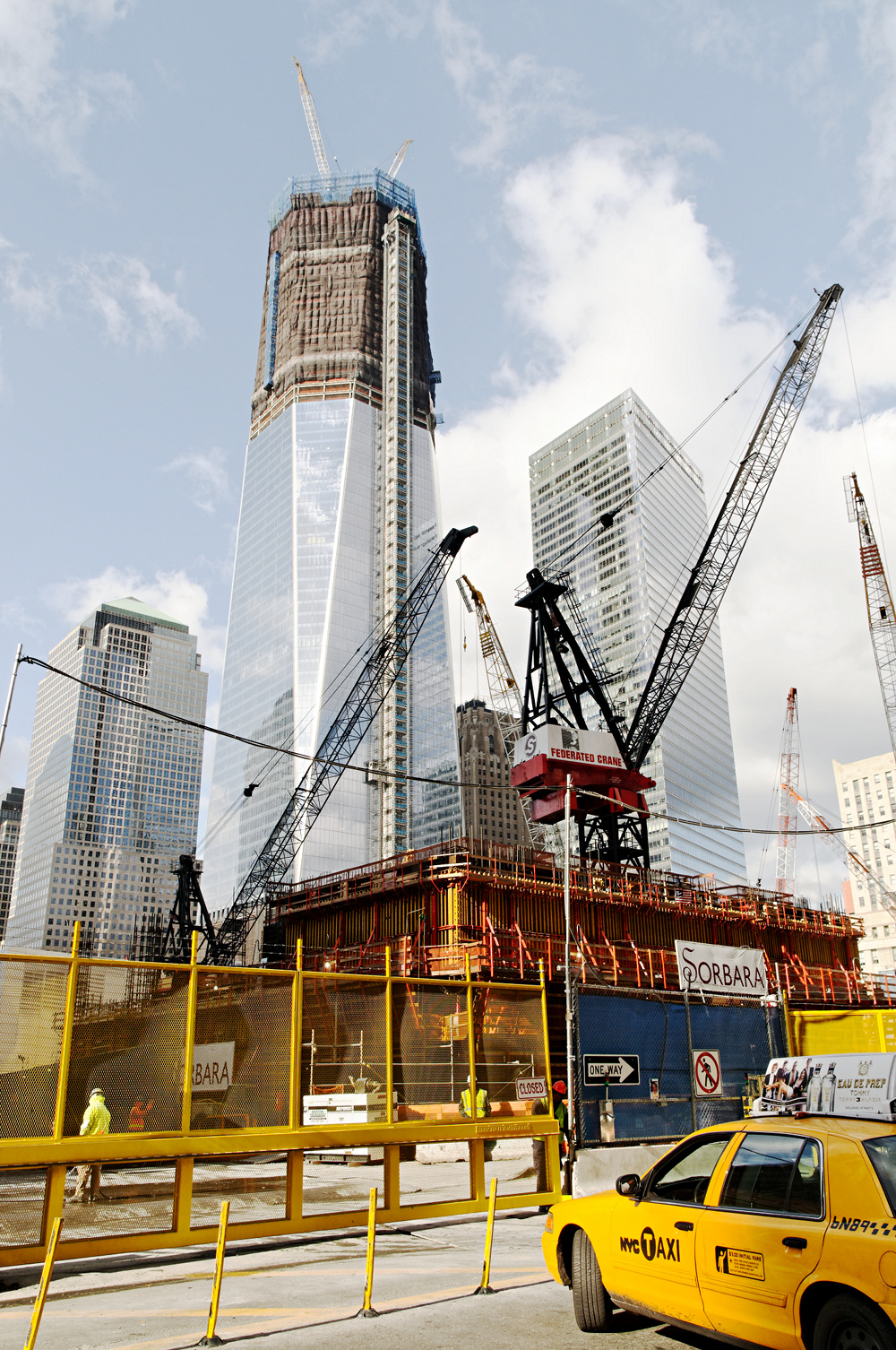
1 WTC and 3 WTC under construction as of November 12, 2011

Several of the towers reached significant milestones in 2013: for instance, One WTC's spire was installed from January 15 to May 10, 2013. Construction of 2 WTC up to street level was completed in mid-2013, with work on the rest of the building delayed until tenants for 2 WTC could be found. Work also progressed on 3 WTC's below-grade foundations and the ground-level podium, which was completed by October 2013. 4 WTC, meanwhile, opened in November 2013, making it the second tower on the site to open behind 7 World Trade Center, as well as the first building on the Port Authority property. The first tenants to move into 4 WTC were two government agencies. The foundation of 5 WTC was also completed by November 2013, although construction on the main structure stalled because of a lack of tenants. In early December 2013, Australian retail corporation Westfield announced that it would invest US$800 million for complete control of the retail space at the rebuilt center, with subsidiary Westfield Corporation buying out the Port Authority's 50 percent stake in the retail part of the World Trade Center site. Liberty Park, a new elevated park, also began construction in late 2013 when the Vehicle Security Center was completed. The Port Authority allotted about $50 million to the park's construction in December 2013.

The September 11 Museum opened to victims' families on April 15, 2014, and to the general public six days later. Temporary fences were removed around the memorial. At the same time, the September 11 Memorial discontinued the requirement for tickets in order to enter the memorial, not only providing pedestrian access to the future towers, but also a path through the site to the Memorial Plaza and surrounding streets. 3 WTC's construction resumed in August 2014, with projected completion by 2018. In September 2014, it was announced that the original plans for the Performing Arts Center had been canceled; construction had been slated to start in December 2014. The St. Nicholas Greek Orthodox Church's ground blessing ceremony and symbolic laying of the cornerstone took place at Liberty Park in October 2014, with construction expected to be completed within two years. One WTC opened on November 3, 2014, and the first 170 employees of anchor tenant Condé Nast began their work there. In June 2015, the designers of 3 WTC scrapped plans for the rooftop spire in order to standardize the roofs with 2 and 4 WTC. The design for 2 WTC was also completely changed as part of an anchor tenant deal with News Corp, which eventually did not fall through.

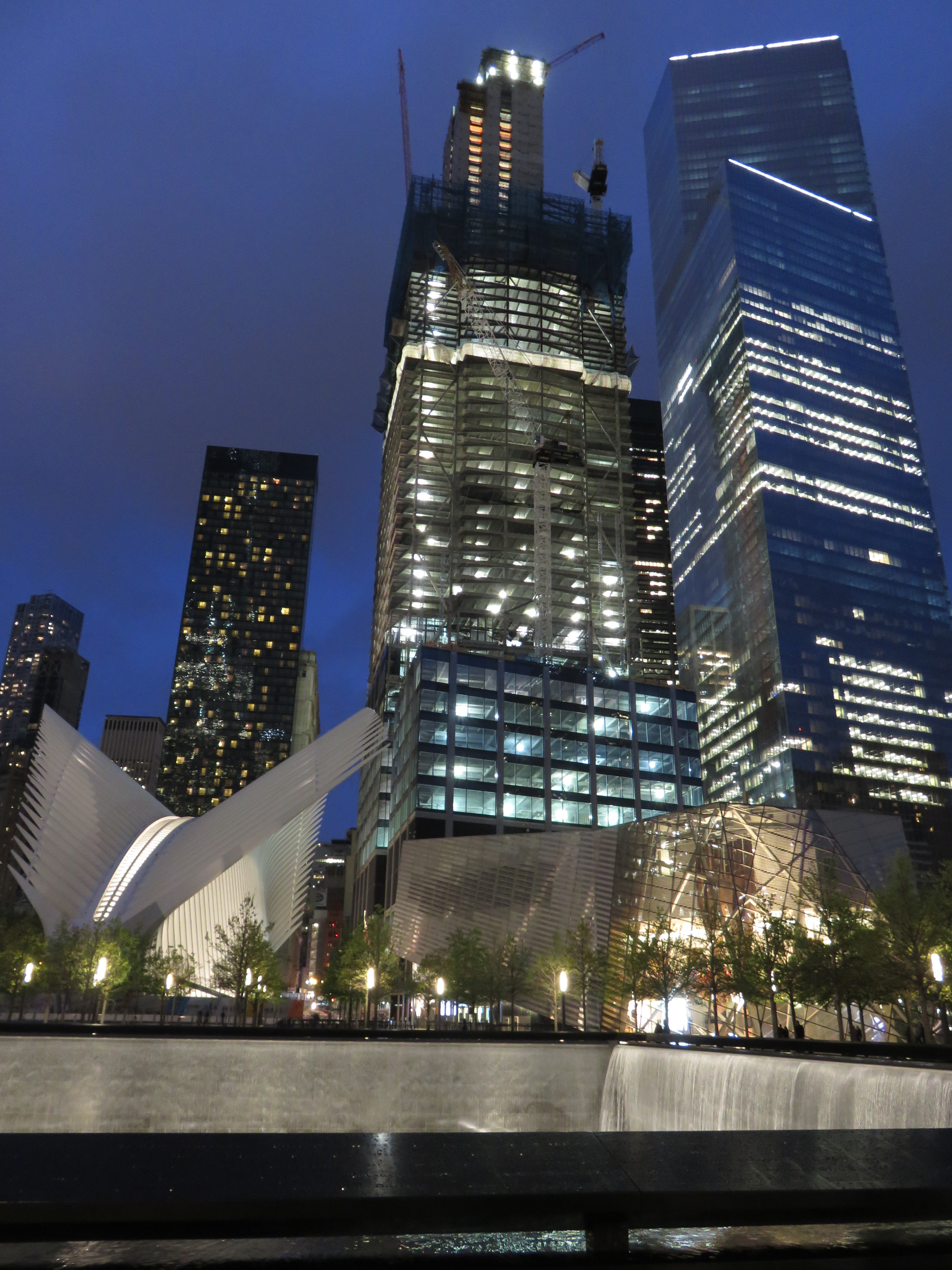
3 World Trade Center under construction in 2016

The World Trade Center Transportation Hub formally opened on March 3, 2016, several years behind schedule and billions of dollars over budget. Liberty Park opened on June 29, 2016, while Westfield World Trade Center, located partially within the hub, opened with its first group of stores on August 16, 2016. The performing arts center was renamed that summer for billionaire businessman Ronald Perelman, who donated $75 million to the center, and on September 8, 2016, a design was revealed for the new center. 3 WTC was topped out in October 2016. On November 29, 2016, the St. Nicholas Church was ceremoniously topped out with a temporary cross.

On March 27, 2017, it was announced that construction on the Perelman Performing Arts Center would be delayed due to ongoing funding disputes. Construction on the center's underground parking garage began in August 2017, with the center itself expected to be built between 2018 and 2020. The same month, the Port Authority installed the iconic sculpture The Sphere within the park, overlooking its original location in the old World Trade Center. Previously, the damaged sculpture by Fritz Koenig had been located in Battery Park. On the 16th anniversary of the 9/11 attacks, a writer for Curbed New York said that although "there is a World Trade Center again", it was not finished: 3 WTC had yet to open; 2 and 5 WTC did not have definite completion dates; and the St. Nicholas Church and Performing Arts Center were still under construction. At the time, 3 WTC was slated to open in early 2018, while the church was expected to open in November 2018. 3 WTC opened on June 11, 2018, becoming the fourth skyscraper at the site to be completed. The WTC Cortlandt subway station at Greenwich and Cortlandt Streets reopened on September 8, 2018, after being closed for nearly seventeen years following the September 11 attacks. A ribbon-cutting ceremony for the Perelman Performing Arts Center was hosted on September 13, 2023. In February 2026, plans to resume construction of 2 World Trade Center were announced after American Express agreed to become that building's anchor tenant.

== Structures ==
Overview of the World Trade Center site

Six buildings, the 9/11 memorial and museum, a mall, a transportation hub, a parking lot, a park, a church, and a performing arts venue are to eventually occupy the new World Trade Center. As of July 2026, progress on the construction of the redesigned site was as follows:

Name	Image	Date construction started	Date of completion	Height	Current status
One World Trade Center		April 27, 2006; 20 years ago	November 3, 2014; 12 years ago	1,776 feet (541 m)	Completed
2 World Trade Center		July 9, 2026; 4 months ago	2031; 5 years' time	1,226 feet (374 m)	Under construction
3 World Trade Center		March 8, 2010; 16 years ago	June 11, 2018; 8 years ago	1,079 feet (329 m)	Completed
4 World Trade Center		January 22, 2008; 18 years ago	November 13, 2013; 13 years ago	978 feet (298 m)	Completed
5 World Trade Center		2027; 1 year's time	2030; 4 years' time	902 feet (275 m)	On hold
Ronald O. Perelman Performing Arts Center (6 World Trade Center)		August 31, 2017; 9 years ago	September 13, 2023; 3 years ago	138 feet (42 m)	Completed
7 World Trade Center		May 7, 2002; 24 years ago	May 23, 2006; 20 years ago	745 feet (227 m)	Completed
National September 11 Memorial		March 13, 2006; 20 years ago	September 11, 2011; 15 years ago		Completed
National September 11 Museum		March 13, 2006; 20 years ago	May 21, 2014; 12 years ago		Completed
World Trade Center Transportation Hub		April 26, 2010; 16 years ago	March 3, 2016; 10 years ago		Completed
Vehicular Security Center		November 10, 2011; 15 years ago	2017; 9 years ago		Completed
Liberty Park		November 20, 2013; 13 years ago	June 29, 2016; 10 years ago		Completed
St. Nicholas Greek Orthodox Church		October 18, 2014; 12 years ago	December 6, 2022; 3 years ago		Completed
Fiterman Hall		December 2009; 16 years ago	August 27, 2012; 14 years ago		Completed

=== Buildings ===
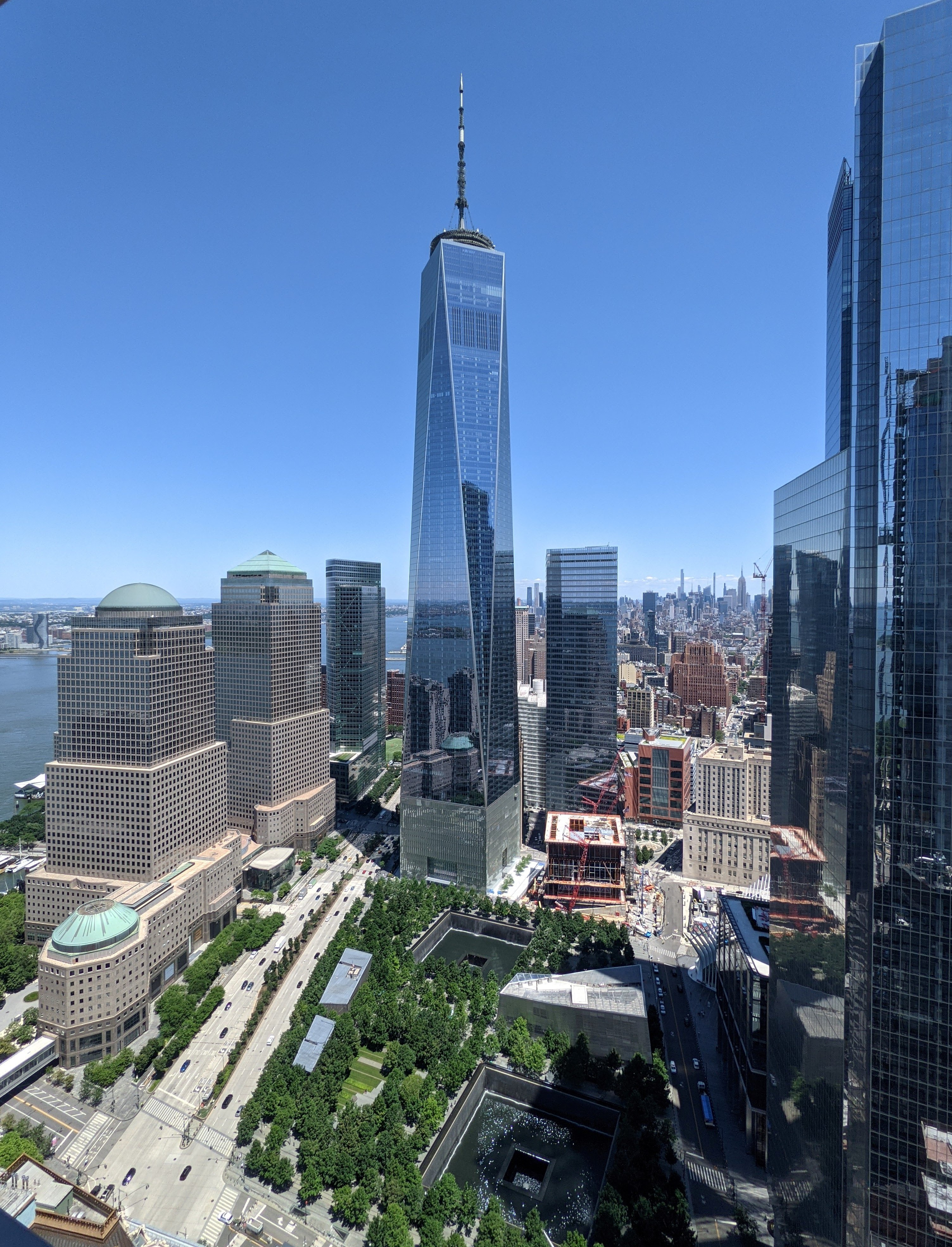
The new World Trade Center complex in June 2021

One World Trade Center (previously nicknamed the "Freedom Tower" by Governor Pataki) is the centerpiece of Daniel Libeskind's design. The building rises to 1,368 feet (417 m), the height of the original 1 World Trade Center (The North Tower), and its spire rises to the symbolic height of 1,776 feet (541 m). This height refers to 1776, the year in which the United States Declaration of Independence was signed. The tower was a collaboration between Studio Daniel Libeskind and Skidmore, Owings & Merrill architect David Childs. Childs acted as the design architect and project manager for the tower, and Daniel Libeskind collaborated on the concept and schematic design. The building opened on November 3, 2014.

2 World Trade Center, also known as 200 Greenwich Street, was designed by British architect Norman Foster, with AAI Architects, P.C. as architect of record. Construction of everything up to street level was completed in mid-2013, but the rest of the building has yet to be built until tenants for 2 WTC can be found. As of 2026, the building was planned to be completed in 2031 after American Express agreed to become that building's anchor tenant.

3 World Trade Center, located at 175 Greenwich Street, was designed by Richard Rogers Partnership, with AAI Architects, P.C. as architect of record. It stands across Greenwich Street from the Memorial's two reflecting pools. The below-grade foundations and the ground-level podium was completed by October 2013. After a two-year stoppage in above-ground construction, the tower project itself started in August 2014, and the building opened on June 11, 2018.

4 World Trade Center, also known as 150 Greenwich Street, was designed by Maki and Associates, with AAI Architects, P.C. as architect of record. The building opened in November 2013, making it the second tower on the site to open behind 7 World Trade Center, as well as the first building on the Port Authority property.

5 World Trade Center, which is to stand on the site of the Deutsche Bank Building, was originally designed by Kohn Pedersen Fox. Although the foundation was completed in 2013, construction on the main structure has not yet commenced.

7 World Trade Center stands off of Port Authority property. David Childs of Skidmore, Owings & Merrill designed the tower. The building is 52 stories tall (plus one underground floor), making it the 28th tallest in New York. It opened on May 23, 2006, achieving LEED gold status and being the first tower in the complex to reopen.

=== Memorial and museum ===
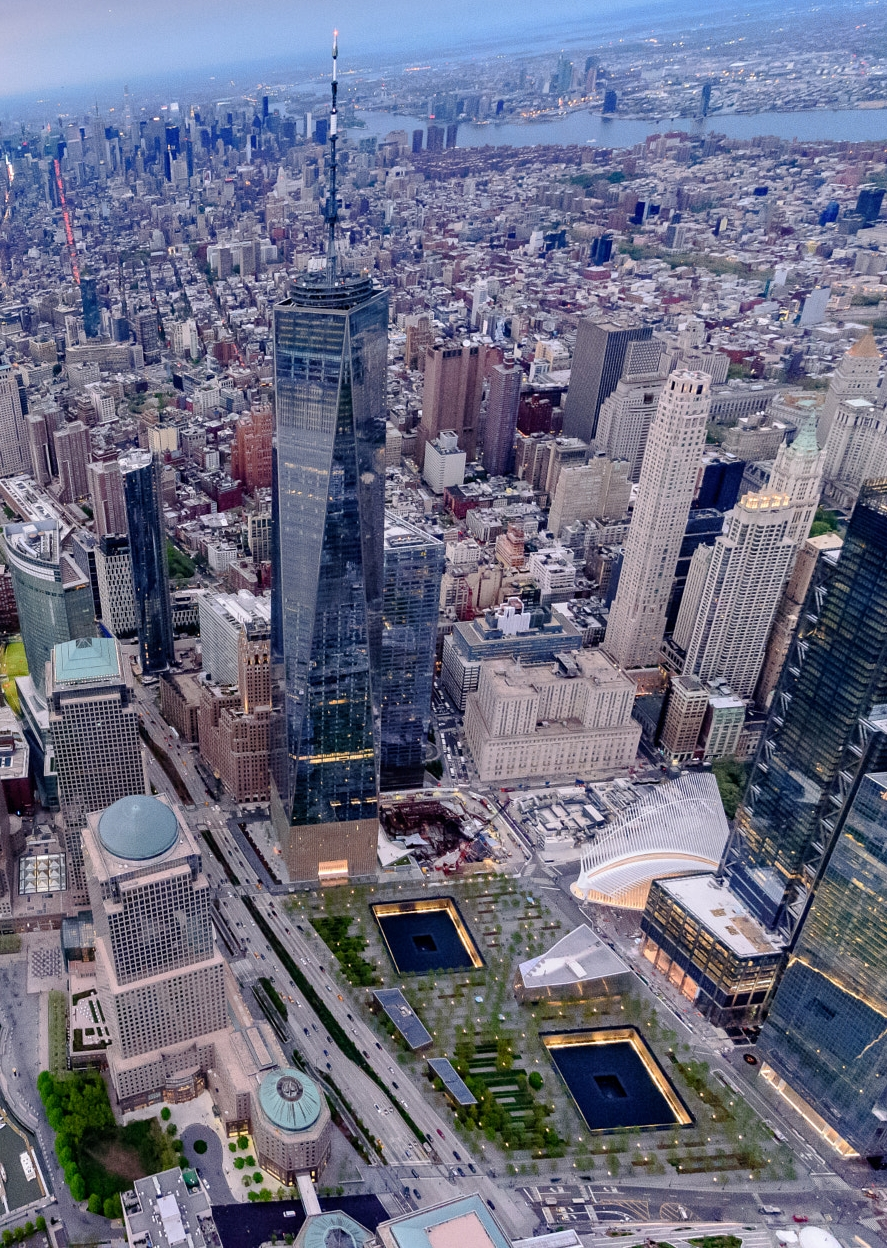
The National September 11 Memorial & Museum in the new World Trade Center complex

A memorial called Reflecting Absence honors the victims of the September 11 attacks and the 1993 World Trade Center bombing. The memorial, designed by Peter Walker and Israeli-American architect Michael Arad, consists of a field of trees interrupted by the footprints of the twin towers. Pools of water fill the footprints, underneath which sits a memorial space whose walls bear the names of the victims. The slurry wall, which holds back the Hudson River in the west and was an integral part of Libeskind's proposal, remains exposed. Walker and Arad were selected from more than 5,000 entrants in the World Trade Center Site Memorial Competition in January 2004.

On October 12, 2004, the LMDC announced that Gehry Partners LLP and Snøhetta, an architectural firm from Norway, would design the site's performing arts and museum complexes, respectively, in the same area as the memorial. The Snøhetta-designed museum will act as a memorial museum and visitors' center, after family members of 9/11 victims objected to the building's original occupant, the International Freedom Center. The Ground Zero Museum Workshop is a privately run 501(c) nonprofit museum that is not connected to the official Ground Zero Memorial or Gehry's museum.

Construction of the memorial was completed by early 2011. The memorial opened on September 11, 2011, coinciding with the 10th anniversary of the attacks. The museum was initially scheduled to open on September 11, 2012, but was delayed due to financial disputes and again when Hurricane Sandy significantly damaged the site. The museum was opened in May 2014.

=== Retail space and mall ===
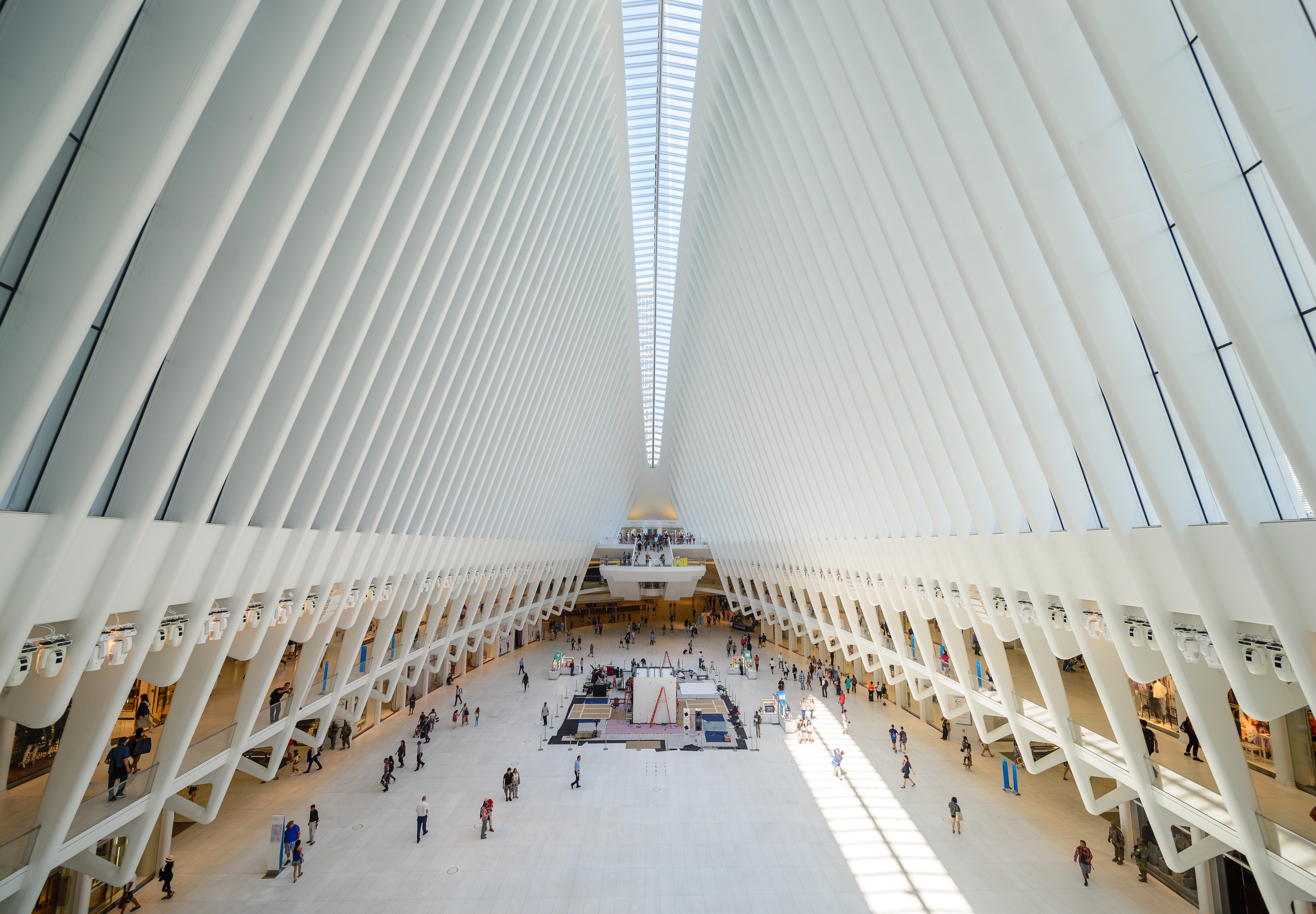
The portion of the Westfield World Trade Center inside the Oculus

Westfield World Trade Center opened with its first group of stores on August 16, 2016. It has roughly 365,000 square feet (33,900 m^{2}) of retail space, which once again makes it the largest shopping mall in Manhattan. Although the new mall is only spread over roughly one-half of the original mall's footprint (due to the new space required for the below-grade National September 11 Memorial & Museum), the mall is double-level, whereas the original mall was a single level. Three additional levels will exist above grade on the lower floors of 2 and 3 World Trade Center, while 4 World Trade Center currently houses four above-grade levels. The World Trade Center station's headhouse, the Oculus, also houses a large amount of retail space.

=== Transportation Hub ===
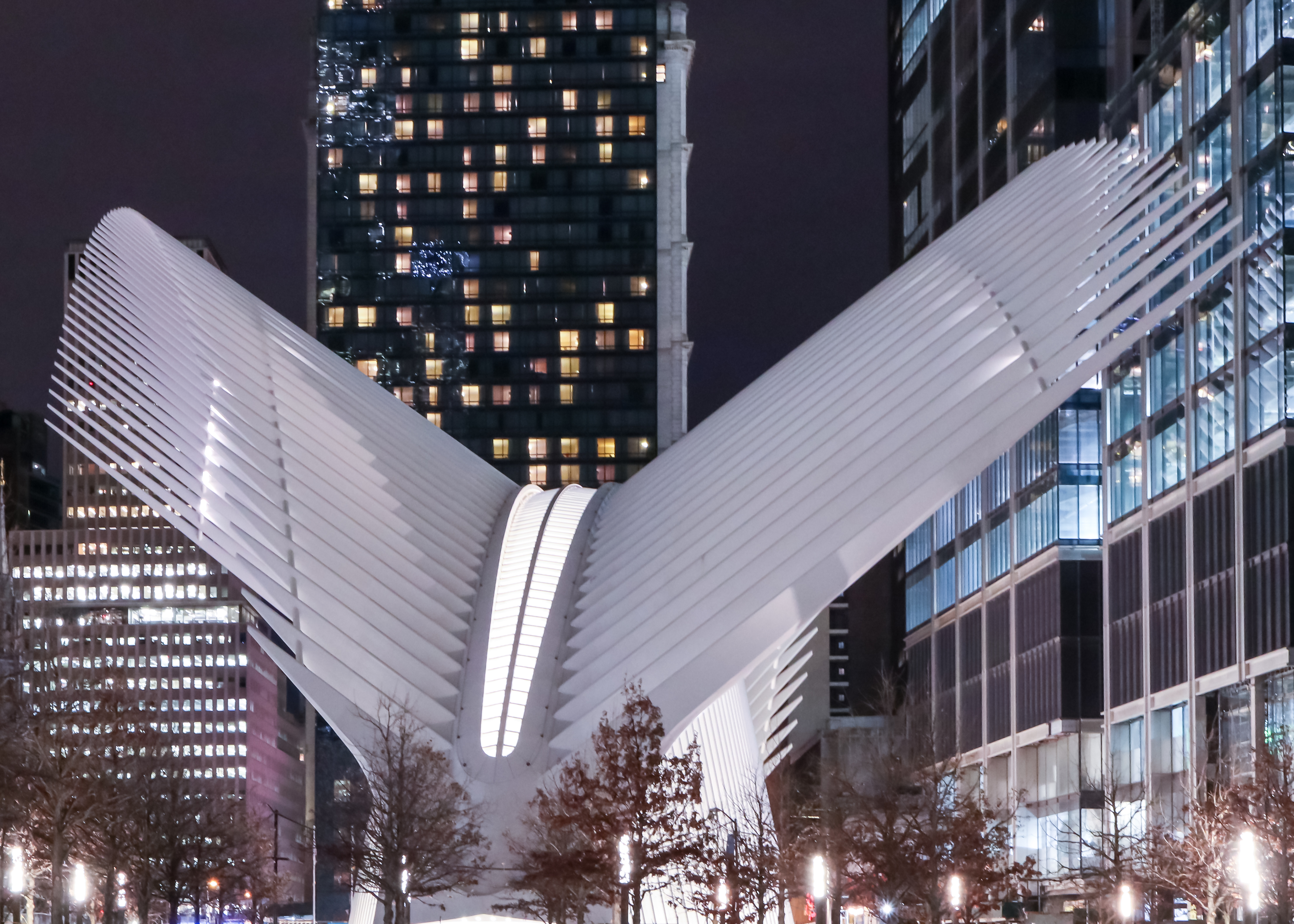
The Oculus building of the World Trade Center station (PATH)

Santiago Calatrava designed the World Trade Center Transportation Hub (its main asset being the PATH station) to replace the old World Trade Center station. The Transport Hub connects the PATH station to the WTC Cortlandt station (1 train), the Battery Park City Ferry Terminal, the Brookfield Place, and One World Trade Center on the west; and the 2, 3, 4, 5, A, C, E, J, N, R, W, and Z trains through the Fulton Center on the east. The new station, as well as the September 11 Memorial and Museum, is air-cooled via a heat exchanger fed by four pipes carrying water from the Hudson River. The cost for the transportation hub is estimated at $3.44 billion, a statistic that has seen much controversy given its greatly inflated cost. The hub formally opened on March 3, 2016, several years behind schedule and billions of dollars over budget.

=== Perelman Performing Arts Center ===
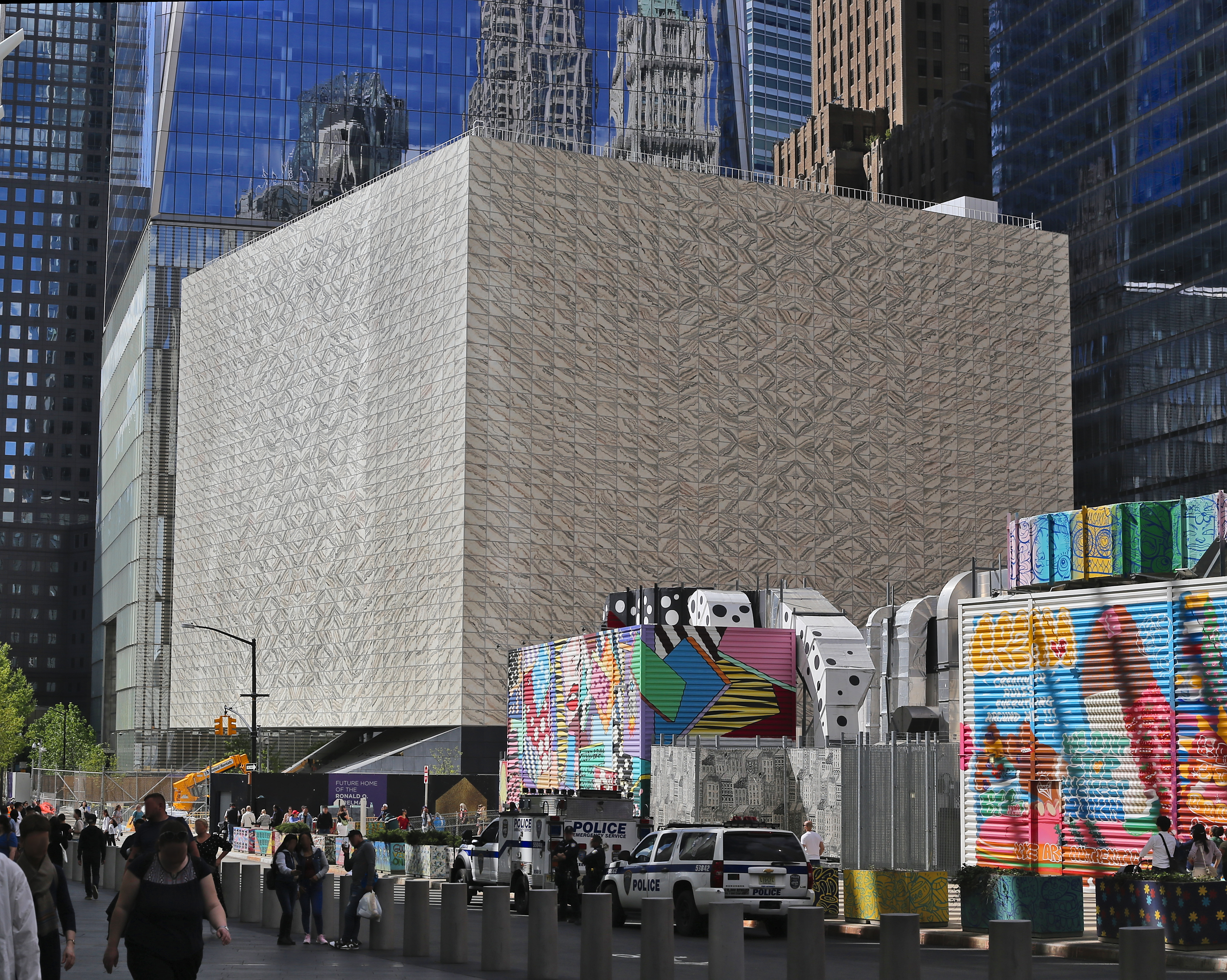
Construction on the Ronald O. Perelman Performing Arts Center in May 2023

The Ronald O. Perelman Performing Arts Center (also known as 6 World Trade Center) was announced originally as The World Trade Center's Performing Arts Center in 2004, with the building to be designed by Gehry Partners LLP and Snøhetta. Construction was to begin in December 2014 when the removal of the temporary PATH station commenced. However, the original plans were shelved in September 2014. After a design was chosen in 2015, it was announced that Joshua Prince-Ramus was awarded the contract to design the building. In June 2016, the center was renamed after billionaire businessman Ronald Perelman, who donated $75 million to the center, and on September 8, 2016, a design was revealed for the new center. The underground parking garage started construction in 2017, followed by the building in 2018. The center opened on September 13, 2023.

The Performing Arts Center includes 129,000 square feet (12,000 m^{2}) across three floors. The public floor is located at street level and houses a restaurant/bar to provide refreshments during show intermissions. The second floor consists of rehearsal and dressing rooms for theater actors, and the third floor has three theaters with between 99 and 450 seats. All three theaters are designed so that the walls will be able to rotate and expand to provide extra space for a single theater if needed. The theaters can fit approximately 1,200 people combined.

=== Liberty Park and constituent structures ===
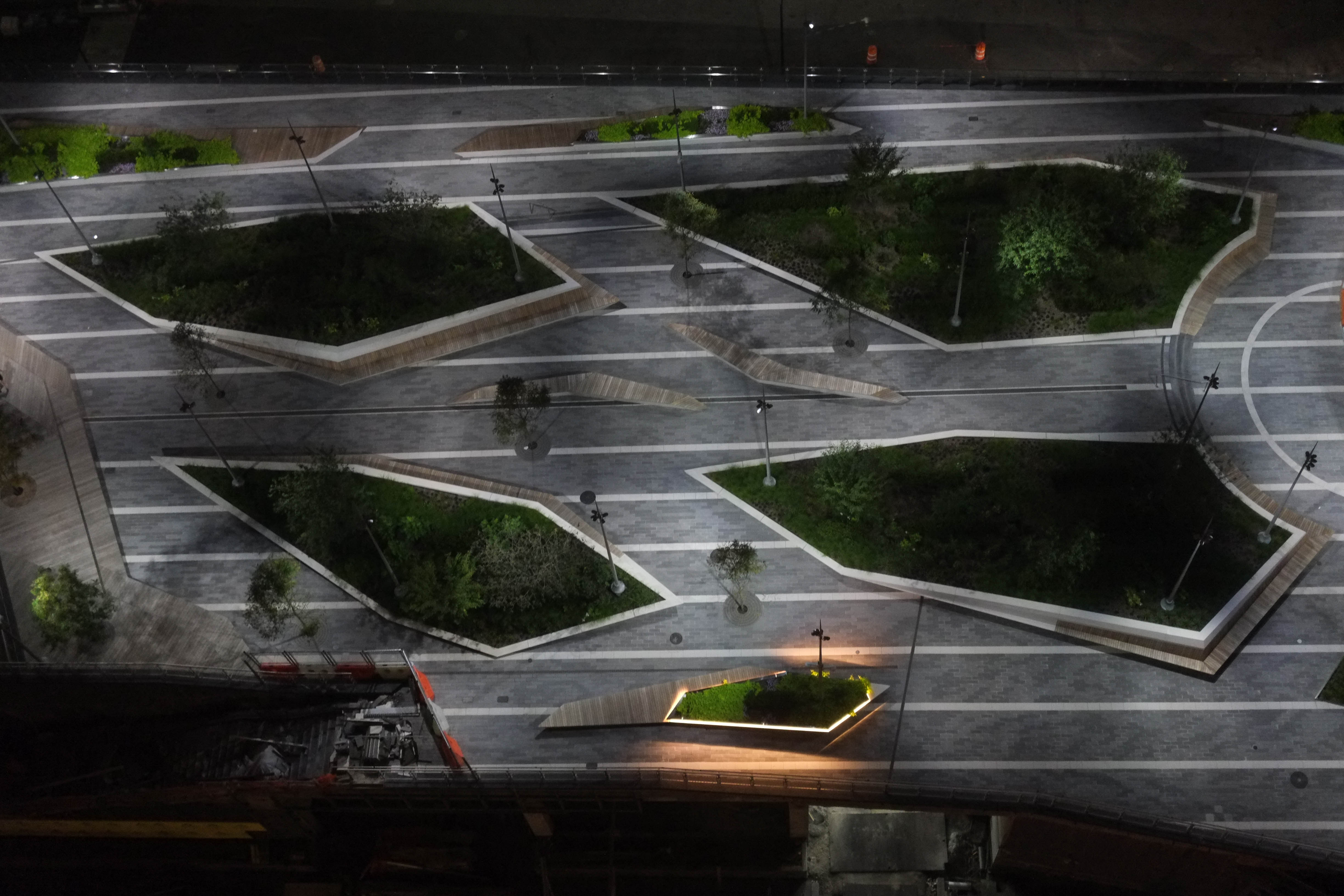
An aerial view of Liberty Park

Liberty Park, a new elevated park, was built on top of a parking complex named the Vehicular Security Center at the southwest corner of the site. Construction began in 2013 when the Vehicular Security Center was completed. About $50 million was allocated to the park's construction by the Port Authority of New York and New Jersey in December 2013. The park opened on June 29, 2016. On August 16, 2017, the Port Authority installed the iconic sculpture The Sphere within the park, overlooking its original location in the old World Trade Center.

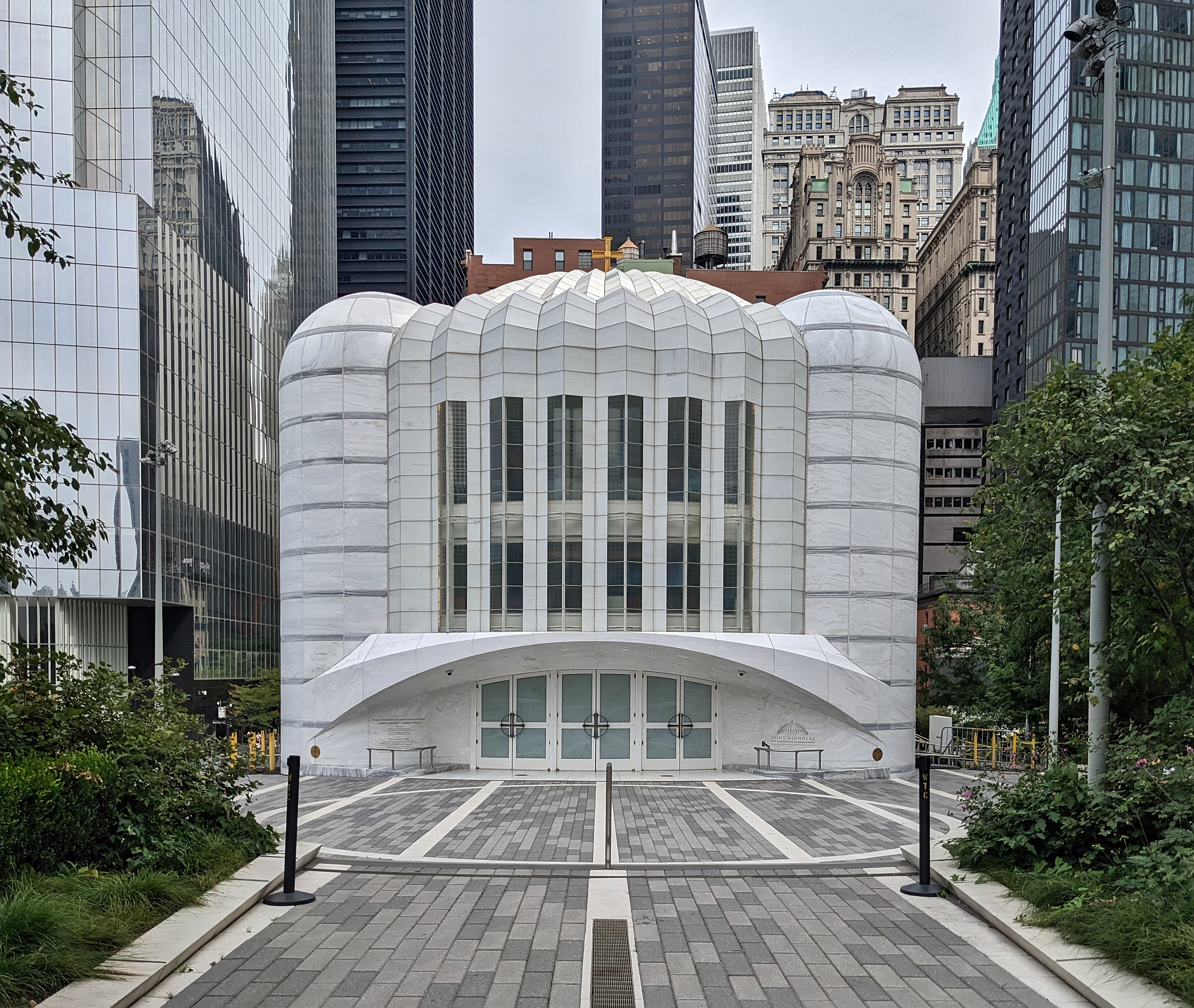
The St. Nicholas Greek Orthodox Church

The St. Nicholas Greek Orthodox Church was originally supposed to be relocated, but the most recent plans call for the church to be built in Liberty Park. On July 23, 2008, the Port Authority of New York and New Jersey reached a deal with the leaders of the church for the Port Authority to acquire the 1,200-square-foot (110 m^{2}) lot that the church occupied for $20 million, and relocate the church. Officials reneged in 2009, leading the Greek Orthodox Diocese of America to sue the Port Authority for failing to rebuild the church. On October 14, 2011, an agreement for the reconstruction of the church was signed that ended all legal action. The ground blessing ceremony and symbolic laying of the cornerstone took place in October 2014, with construction expected to be completed within two years. However, in December 2017, construction was halted due to unpaid expenses. Work restarted in August 2020. The church fully opened for regular services on December 6, 2022, the Feast of Saint Nicholas.

The 1-acre (0.4 ha) park, measuring 300 feet (91 m) long and located at a height of 20 feet (6.1 m), has a capacity of 750 people. A green wall is located on the Liberty Street facade. A walkway from the pedestrian bridge curves along the park; egresses include three stairways, the pedestrian bridge, and a straight ramp down to Greenwich Street. Of these exits, a wide staircase is located parallel to Greenwich Street and directly behind the church. There are wood benches and a small amphitheater-like elevated space at the West Street end of the park. Finally, there is an observation balcony along much of Liberty Street and another slightly curved balcony at the church's foot.

=== Fiterman Hall ===
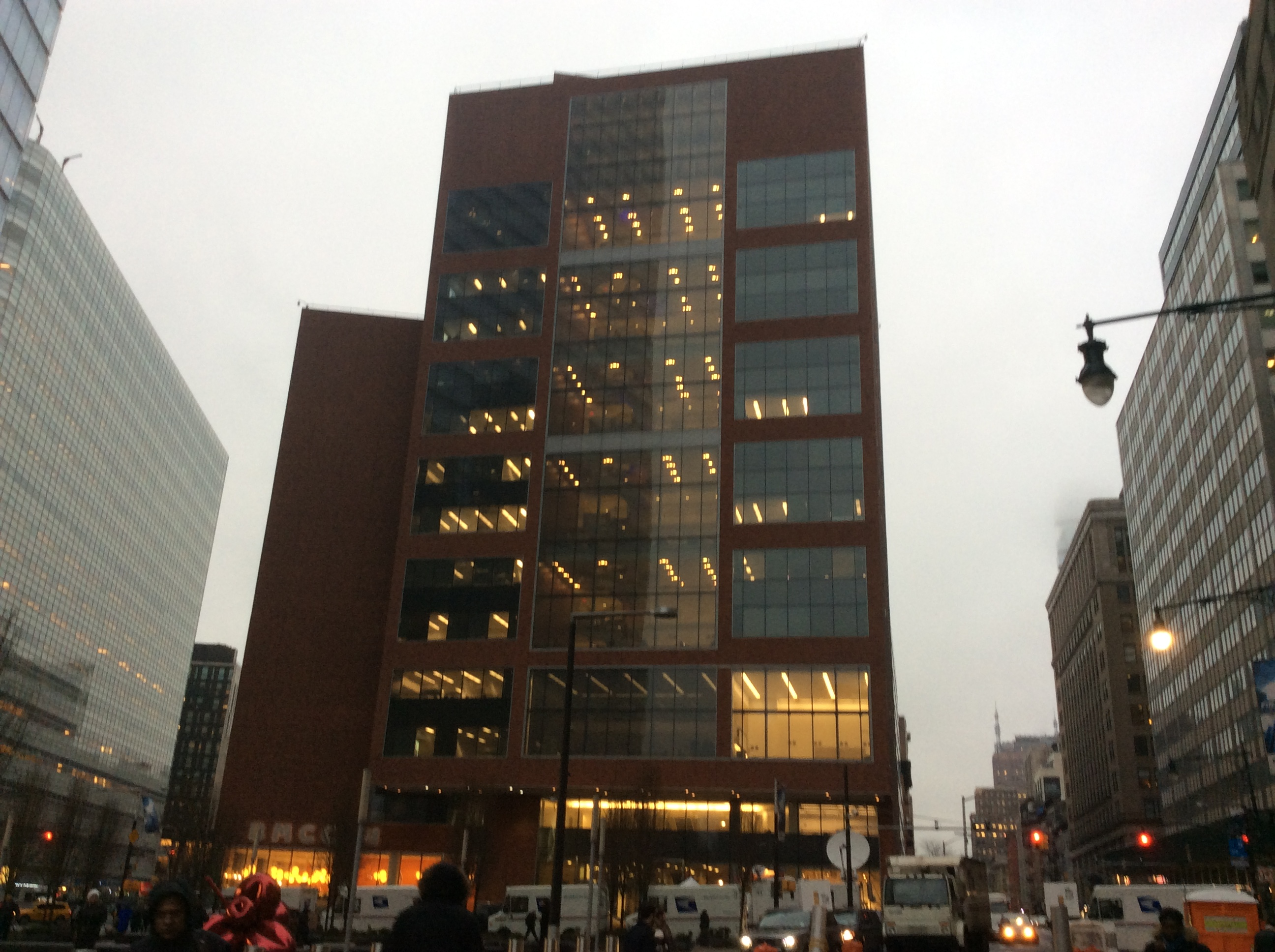
The new Fiterman Hall

The original Fiterman Hall opened as an office building in 1959 and occupied a block bounded by Greenwich Street, Barclay Street, West Broadway, and Park Place. It was donated to BMCC in 1993 by Miles and Shirley Fiterman, for whom the building was subsequently named. In 2000, the State of New York Dormitory Authority, which owned the building, began a massive renovation to better adapt the building for classroom use. During the September 11 attacks in 2001, Fiterman Hall's structure was severely damaged by debris from the collapse of 7 World Trade Center. The renovation was never completed, and the building was condemned and demolished in 2008. After a series of delays, a new building designed by the architectural firm Pei Cobb Freed & Partners broke ground in December 2009 and was completed in 2012.

== Logo ==

The World Trade Center's new logo, revealed in August 2014, was designed by the firm Landor Associates and shaped like a "W". All the black bars, the empty spaces, and the "W" itself symbolizes something, giving the logo at least six meanings:

- The five bars in the logo represent the towers that will comprise the completed World Trade Center.
- The top half of the logo features bars cut off at a 17.76-degree angle, evoking One World Trade Center's 1,776-foot (541 m) height.
- Two white columns at the top symbolize the Tribute in Light memorial.
- Three black bars at the top symbolize the Twin Towers' trident-shaped columns.
- Two black bars at the bottom stand for the twin pools of the National September 11 Memorial & Museum.
- The logo, as a whole, is shaped like a "W", which stands for "World Trade Center" and "Westfield World Trade Center".

Landor Associates was awarded a $3.57 million contract in 2013 for redesigns, which comprised "the performance of professional services for the development and implementation of the World Trade Center (WTC) site-wide navigation, signage, and operational communications program" and included the development of the new logo. Douglas Riccardi, the principal in the design firm Memo, stated, "Its strength is its ability to be seen in many ways. You could never get more meaning in five little bars. The problem is that people may not bother to find out what the meanings are."

== See also ==
- Construction of One World Trade Center
- Project Rebirth
- The Sphere
- List of World Trade Centers
- Adjacent buildings
  - Verizon Building, north of One World Trade Center, west of 7 World Trade Center
  - 90 West Street, south of Liberty Park
