= Think (disambiguation) =

Think is the act of creating a thought.

Think or Thinks may also refer to:

== Arts and media ==
=== Music ===
- Think (band), a 1970s musical group best known for the 1971 hit "Once You Understand"

==== Albums ====
- Think! (James Brown album), 1960
- Think! (Lonnie Smith album), 1968

==== Songs ====
- "Think" (The "5" Royales song), 1957, later covered by James Brown in 1960 and 1973
- "Think" (Aretha Franklin song), 1968
- "Think" (Brenda Lee song), 1964
- "Think" (Information Society song), 1990
- "Think" (Rolling Stones song), 1965
- "Think (About It)", a 1972 song recorded by Lyn Collins
- "Think!", the theme song from the game show Jeopardy!
- "Think", a song by The Screaming Jets from their 1992 album Tear of Thought
- "Think", a song by Booker T. & the M.G.'s from their 1966 album And Now!
- "Think", a song by Puddle of Mudd from their 2003 album Life on Display
- "Think", by Toya from her 2001 self-titled album, Toya
- "Think" by Kaleida from the 2014 film John Wick

=== Books ===
- Think (book), a book by Michael R. LeGault
- Think: A Compelling Introduction to Philosophy, by Simon Blackburn
- Thinks ..., a novel by David Lodge

=== Other media ===
- "Think!" (short story), a 1977 short story by Isaac Asimov
- Think, far-right newspaper
- Thinks, a play by Keith Waterhouse
- (Th)ink, a weekly editorial cartoon by Keith Knight
- Think (journal), an academic journal
- Think, a public talk radio program produced by KERA FM.

== Other uses ==
- "Think" (IBM), a slogan used by Thomas J. Watson
- Think Global, an electric vehicle manufacturer
- THINK Team, group of architects, planners and engineers that designed a plan for the redevelopment of the World Trade Center
- THINK Together, a non-profit organization providing education support to students

== See also ==
- Thinking (disambiguation)
- Think tank (disambiguation)
