= The American in Me (Steve Forbert album) =

Studio album by Steve Forbert
- Released: 1992
- Label: Geffen
- Producer: Pete Anderson

Steve Forbert chronology
Streets of This Town (1988)	The American in Me (1992)	The Best of Steve Forbert: What Kinda Guy? (1993)

The American in Me is an album by the American musician Steve Forbert, released in 1992. Forbert was dropped by Geffen Records after the album's release. He supported the album with a North American tour.

== Production ==
The album was produced by Pete Anderson; it took a while for Forbert and Geffen to agree on the appropriate producer. Anderson also played guitar on the album; multi-instrumentalist Anthony Crawford contributed as well. Some of the songs employ just guitar and harmonica. Many songs deal with the responsibilities and failures of adulthood. Forbert chose to use plain, unabstract language. "New Working Day" lampoons a generic corporate work mentality. The liner notes include a quote from Doc Pomus: "There's nothin' wrong with you a hit record won't cure."

== Critical reception ==
Professional ratings
Review scores
Source	Rating
AllMusic	3/5 stars
Calgary Herald	B
The Encyclopedia of Popular Music	4/5 stars
MusicHound Rock: The Essential Album Guide	4/5 stars
Orlando Sentinel	3/5 stars
The Rolling Stone Album Guide	3/5 stars

The Chicago Tribune wrote that "Forbert's youthful rasp has barely changed with time and his ability to pen thoughtful tunes is still in place." The Baltimore Sun stated: "Growing old gracefully has never been a particularly rock and roll thing to do, but few pop musicians have ever expressed the regret and disillusionment of advancing adulthood as eloquently as Steve Forbert does on The American in Me." The Washington Post determined that "the latest batch of songs often amounts to little more than overly familiar characters and vignettes: the Southern eccentric, the put-upon blue-collar worker, the blight of pollution."

Rolling Stone concluded that the album's "accounts of hard-won experience too often seem pedantic or self-pitying, and Forbert's relentless earnestness wears thin after a while." The Orlando Sentinel opined that, "when it comes to documenting the state of the average guy, Forbert has emerged as a more eloquent spokesman than Bruce Springsteen or John Mellencamp." The Calgary Herald deemed Forbert "not a brilliant songwriter, but always heartfelt."

== Track listing ==
No.	Title	Length
1.	"Born Too Late"
2.	"If You're Waiting on Me"
3.	"Responsibility"
4.	"When the Sun Shines"
5.	"The American in Me"
6.	"Baby, Don't"
7.	"Change in the Weather"
8.	"You Cannot Win 'Em All"
9.	"Rock While I Can Rock"
10.	"New Working Day"
