= Little Stevie Orbit =

Studio album by Steve Forbert
- Released: 1980
- Recorded: 1980
- Studio: A&R, New York
- Genre: Pop
- Length: 42:58
- Label: Nemperor
- Producer: Pete Solley

Steve Forbert chronology
Jackrabbit Slim (1979)	Little Stevie Orbit (1980)	Steve Forbert (1982)

Little Stevie Orbit is the third album by American singer-songwriter Steve Forbert.

== Critical reception ==
Professional ratings
Review scores
Source	Rating
AllMusic	3/5 stars
The Encyclopedia of Popular Music	2/5 stars
The Rolling Stone Album Guide	2.5/5 stars

The New York Times called the album "a mainstream pop record, for better and for worse, with the principal assertion of personality by Mr. Forbert coming in what sounds like his increasingly mannered singing."

== Track listing ==
All songs written by Steve Forbert

1. "Get Well Soon" – 3:53
2. "Cellophane City" – 5:33
3. "Song for Carmelita" – 1:55
4. "Laughter Lou (Who Needs You?)" – 3:10
5. "Song for Katrina" – 3:30
6. "One More Glass of Beer" – 4:20
7. "Lucky" – 1:12
8. "Rain" – 3:10
9. "I'm an Automobile" – 2:58
10. "Schoolgirl" – 3:01
11. "If You've Gotta Ask You'll Never Know" – 2:15
12. "Lonely Girl" – 3:23
13. "A Visitor" – 4:27

== Charts ==
Chart (1980)	Peak position
Australian (Kent Music Report)	55
Norwegian Albums (VG-lista)	27
US Billboard 200	70

== Personnel ==
- Steve Forbert – guitar, harmonica, vocals
- Paul Errico – organ, accordion, piano on "I'm an Automobile" and "A Visitor"
- Robbie Kondor – organ, piano on "I'm an Automobile" and "A Visitor"
- Shane Fontayne – lead guitar
- Hugh McDonald – bass
- Bobby Lloyd Hicks – drums, percussion
- Barry Lazarowitz – drums on "Lonely Girl"
- Bill Jones – saxophone
- Kenny Kosek – fiddle
- Pete Solley – string arrangements

Technical

- Steve Brown – recording, mixing
- Elliott Landy – photography
