= Steve Forbert =

American pop music singer-songwriter

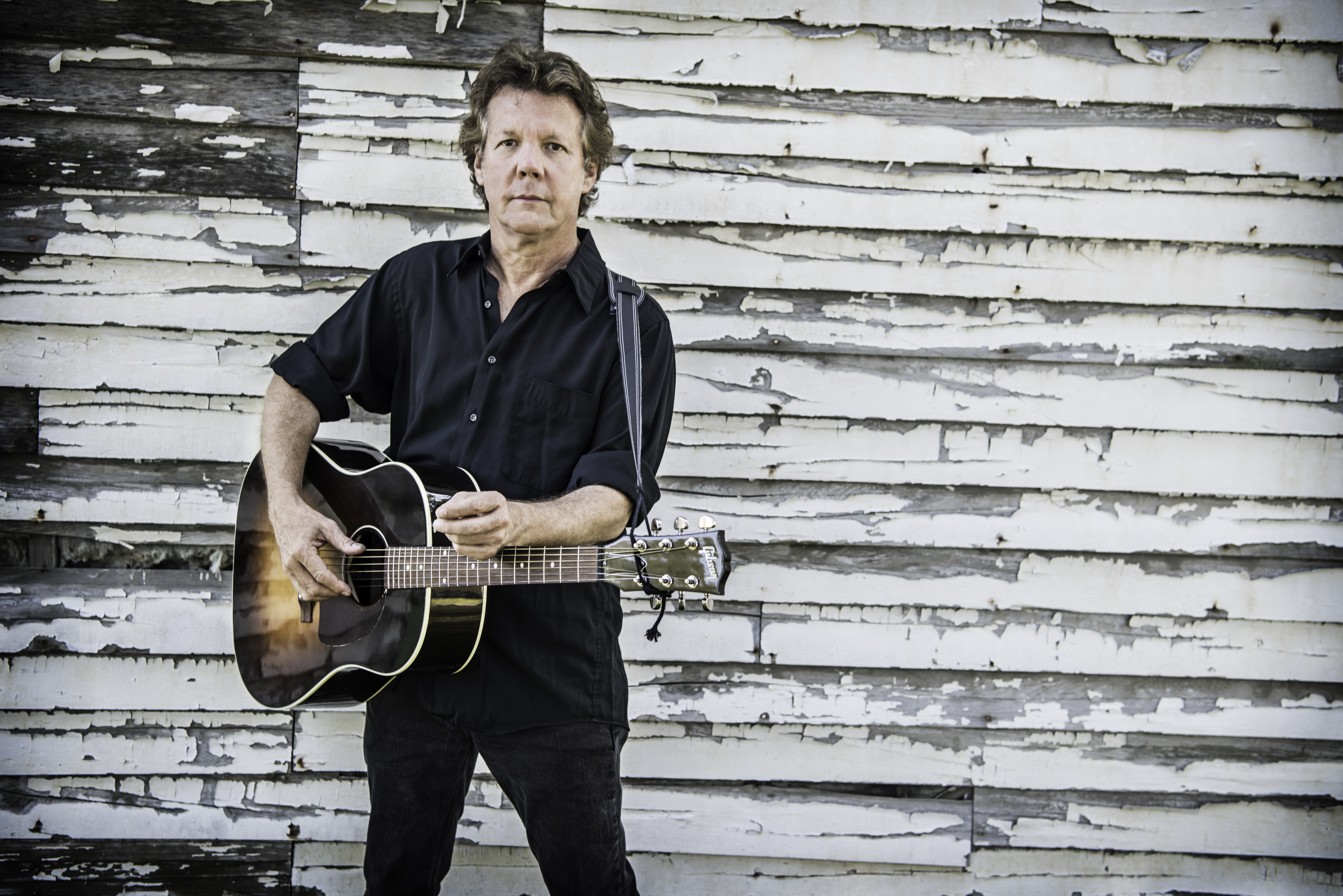
- Steve Forbert 2017

Background information
- Born: Samuel Stephen Forbert; December 13, 1954 (age 71); Meridian, Mississippi, United States
- Genres: Folk; Americana; pop rock
- Occupations: Musician; guitarist; singer-songwriter
- Instruments: Vocals; guitar; harmonica
- Years active: 1978–present
- Labels: Blue Rose Music; Nemperor/CBS; Geffen; Giant; BMG; Paladin; Rolling Tide; Koch; Valley Entertainment; Silverline; Disky; 429; Blue Corn
- Website: www.steveforbert.com

Samuel Stephen Forbert (born December 13, 1954) is an American pop/folk singer-songwriter. His 1979 song "Romeo's Tune" reached No. 11 on the U.S. Billboard Hot 100 and No. 13 on the Billboard Adult Contemporary chart. It also spent two weeks at No. 8 in Canada. Forbert's first four albums all charted on the Billboard 200 chart, with Jackrabbit Slim certified gold in Canada. In 2004, his Any Old Time album was nominated for a Grammy Award in the Best Traditional Folk category. Forbert has released 21 studio and 3 live albums.

Forbert's songs have been recorded by several artists, including Rosanne Cash, Keith Urban, Marty Stuart and Webb Wilder. In 2017, a tribute album, An American Troubadour: The Songs of Steve Forbert, was released, with covers of his songs by twenty-one artists. Bob Harris of BBC Radio 2 said Forbert has "One of the most distinctive voices anywhere."

In September 2018, he released his self-penned memoir, Big City Cat: My Life in Folk Rock, with editor Therese Boyd. It accompanied the release of his 19th studio album The Magic Tree on Blue Rose Music.

== Early life ==
Forbert was born in Meridian, Mississippi, United States. As a child, he fell in love with music, even playing air guitar in a pretend band he called The Mosquitos. Due to a fascination with Top 40 radio, he proclaimed himself a "music junkie." At 17, he started writing songs. After high school, he attended junior college and worked as a truck driver. Forbert moved to New York City in 1976 to experience the punk rock scene of the 1970s. There he performed on the street to passersby in Greenwich Village, and had early shows as a singer with a guitar and harmonica at punk club CBGB before moving on to folk venues Kenny's Castaways and Folk City.

== Musical career ==
Forbert signed a recording contract with Nemperor in 1978, and they released his debut album Alive on Arrival that year. While some, like Village Voice, called him "the new Dylan," of any comparison to Bob Dylan, he said, "You can't pay any attention to that. It was just a cliché back then, and it's nothing I take seriously. I'm off the hook – I don't have to be smarter than everybody else and know all the answers like Bob Dylan."

Even though the sleeve of his second album Jackrabbit Slim stated that "Romeo's Tune" is "dedicated to the memory of Florence Ballard", the song is not really about the Supremes singer who died in 1976. The song, which went to No. 11, was actually written about a girl from Forbert's hometown of Meridian, Mississippi, but was dedicated to Ballard because, as Forbert explained, "that seemed like such bad news to me and such sad news. She wasn't really taken care of by the music business, which is not a new story." The piano part on "Romeo's Tune" was played by former Elvis Presley pianist Bobby Ogdin.

Jackrabbit Slim was recorded completely live at Quadrophonic Studio in Nashville, Tennessee, and the record was produced by John Simon, who had worked with the Band. Jackrabbit Slim peaked at No. 54 in the UK Albums Chart. The album reached No. 20 on the Billboard Top 200 album chart.

Forbert also had a cameo appearance in Cyndi Lauper's "Girls Just Want to Have Fun" video, playing her boyfriend.

In 1984, Forbert had a disagreement with his record company Nemperor and contractual issues prevented him from recording for a number of years afterwards. His 1988 album, Streets of This Town, and the 1992 followup The American in Me, were released by Geffen Records. They received significant airplay.

In the years following, Forbert recorded more albums of songs he wrote and sang, accompanied by his guitar. He maintained a constant touring presence as well.

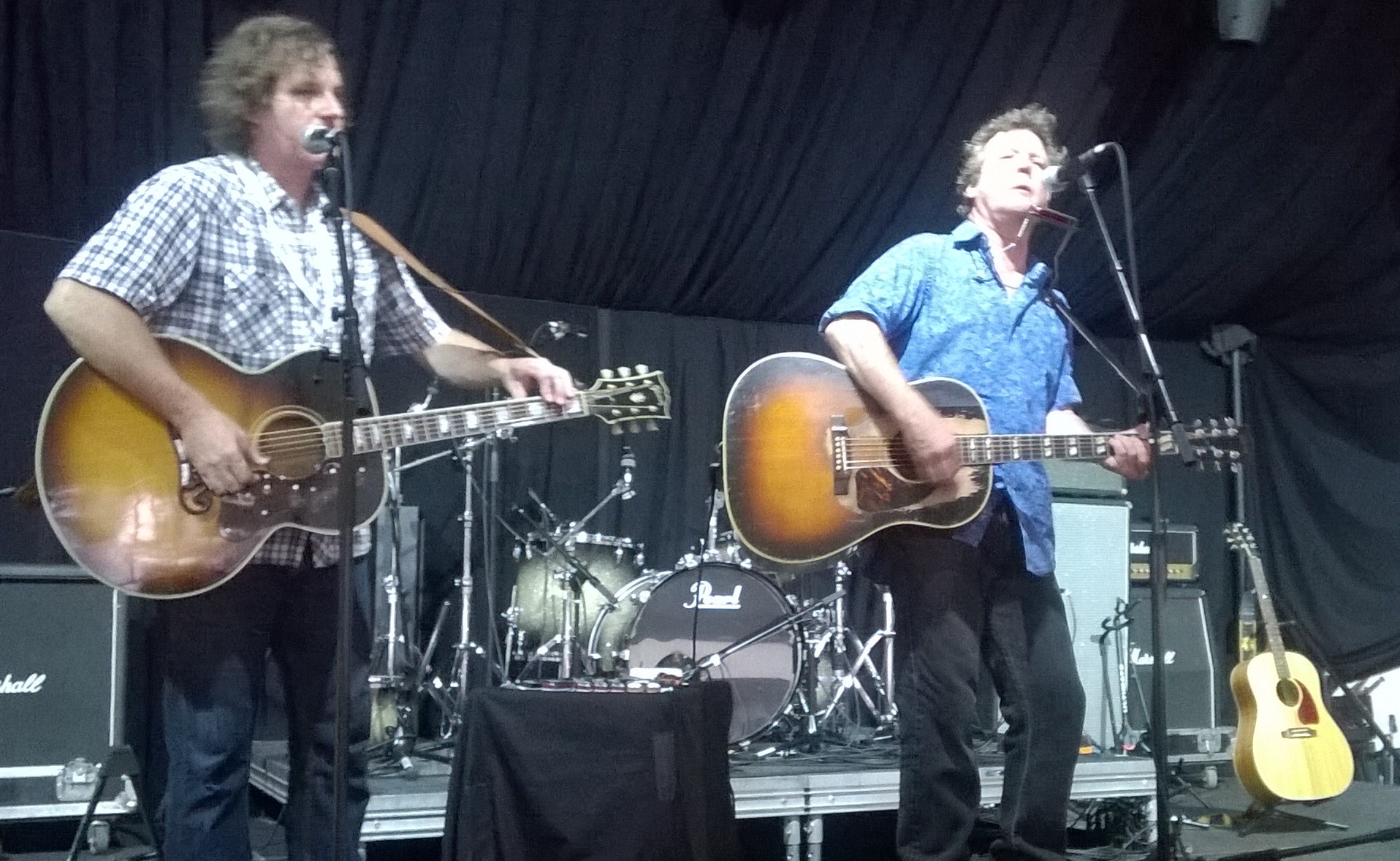
Forbert (r), with guitarist Mark Stuart, performing in 2015

By 1985, Forbert sought out new inspiration and relocated to Nashville. His tribute album to Jimmie Rodgers, Any Old Time, was nominated for a 2004 Grammy Award in the Best Traditional Folk category. In 2006, he was inducted into the Mississippi Music Hall of Fame, and in 2007, Keith Urban covered his hit "Romeo's Tune." The same year, Forbert's music was featured in the film Margot at the Wedding starring Nicole Kidman.

Forbert wrote new music in support of the Occupy Wall St. movement. He also began doing photography using an old LG phone. An exhibit of his cell phone photographs opened at the Tinney Contemporary Art Gallery in Nashville in September 2011.

In 2012, he joined Blue Corn Music, and they released Over With You, produced by Chris Goldsmith (the Blind Boys of Alabama), that same year. Musical backing on the record included Ben Sollee on cello and bass, with Ben Harper guesting on guitar on several tracks. American Songwriter stated "it's all lovely, melancholy, lyrically moving and beautifully performed" and "Like Warren Zevon, Gram Parsons, Bob Dylan, Tom Petty, and Bruce Springsteen, Steve Forbert has left his unmistakable imprint on the landscape of American music."

After the destruction caused by Hurricane Sandy in 2012, Forbert released a music video, "Sandy," to raise awareness about the storm and its aftermath.

In 2013, Blue Corn Music re-released Forbert's first two albums, Alive on Arrival and its gold-certified follow-up Jackrabbit Slim. That year marked the 35th anniversary of the release of Alive on Arrival, and Forbert played that album in its entirety at a number of shows. Alive on Arrival was profiled as one of the greatest debut albums ever in the book Please Allow Me To Introduce Myself.

Forbert's memoir, Big City Cat: My Life in Folk-Rock (PFP Publishing, 2018), was edited by Therese Boyd and released in September 2018. The book covers his four-decade-long career. To accompany the book, at the same time, Forbert released The Magic Tree album on Blue Rose Music. The twelve tracks were culled from demos and new material, and builds on his pop and folk rock style. Joining Forbert on The Magic Tree is longtime accompanying guitarist Clay Barnes and the album was produced by Karl Derfler.

== Personal life ==
In the early 1980s, Forbert moved to the Asbury Park area of the Jersey Shore. There, he married, had children, and in 2001 divorced. That same year, he renewed a relationship with Diane DeFazio.

In 2017 Forbert received a cancer diagnosis. As a result, he had one kidney removed, received chemotherapy and was able to be diagnosed as cancer free.

== Discography ==
=== Studio albums ===
- Alive on Arrival, Nemperor/CBS Records, 1978
- Jackrabbit Slim, Nemperor, 1979
- Little Stevie Orbit, Nemperor, 1980
- Steve Forbert, Nemperor, 1982
- Streets of This Town, Geffen Records, 1988
- The American in Me, Geffen Records, 1992
- Mission of the Crossroad Palms, Giant/Warner Bros. Records, 1995
- Rocking Horse Head, Giant/Warner Bros. Records, 1996
- Evergreen Boy, Koch Records, 2000
- Any Old Time (Songs of Jimmie Rodgers), Koch Records, 2002
- Just Like There's Nothin' to It, Koch Records, 2004
- Strange Names & New Sensations, 429 Records, 2007
- The Place and the Time, 429 Records, 2009
- Down in Flames, Sony Music, 1983 (Released 2009)
- Over with You, Blue Corn Music, 2012
- Compromised, Rock Ridge Music, 2015
- Flying at Night, Rolling Tide, 2016
- The Magic Tree, Blue Rose Music, 2018
- Early Morning Rain, Blue Rose Music, 2020
- Moving Through America, Blue Rose Music, 2022
- Daylight Savings Time, Blue Rose Music, 2024

=== Live albums ===
- King Biscuit Flower Hour: New York, 1982 1996
- Here's Your Pizza 1997
- Live at the Bottom Line 2000
- Jackrabbit Slim (Live) 2020

=== Compilation albums ===
- The Best of Steve Forbert: What Kinda Guy? Columbia/Sony 1993
- Young, Guitar Days Madacy/Rolling Tide Records 2001 [studio outtakes 1978-1981]
- More Young, Guitar Days Valley Entertainment 2002 [studio outtakes 1975-1982]
- Rock While I Can Rock: The Geffen Years Geffen 2003
- Early On: The Best Of The Mississippi Recordings Rolling Tide Records 2012
- Alive on Arrival / Jackrabbit Slim 2CD reissue Blue Corn Records 2013
- An American Troubadour: The Songs of Steve Forbert Blue Rose Music 2017

=== Soundtrack albums ===
- Knockaround Guys, 2001 – performed "Romeo's Tune"
- Margot at the Wedding, 2007 – performed "Romeo's Tune" and "Goin' Down to Laurel"

=== Singles ===
- 1978: "It Isn't Gonna Be That Way"
- 1978: "Goin' Down to Laurel"
- 1979: "Thinkin'"
- 1979: "Romeo's Tune" – U.S. number 11, AUS number 13, CAN number 8
- 1980: "Say Goodbye to Little Jo" – U.S. number 85
- 1980: "The Sweet Love That You Give (Sure Goes a Long Long Way)"
- 1980: "The Oil Song"
- 1980: "Big City Cat"
- 1980: "Song for Katrina"
- 1980: "Get Well Soon"
- 1980: "Cellophane City"
- 1980: "Lonely Girl"
- 1980: "Schoolgirl"
- 1982: "When You Walk in the Room"
- 1982: "Ya Ya (Next to Me)"
- 1988: "On the Streets of This Town"
- 1988: "Running on Love"
- 1992: "Born Too Late"
- 1992: "Responsibility"
- 1992: "Baby, Don't"

=== DVD releases ===
- The Steve Forbert DVD Anthology: You Cannot Win If You Do Not Play, 2005
- On Stage at World Cafe Live, 2007
- Steve Forbert in Concert, 2007

=== SteveForbert.com exclusive releases ===
- Be Here Now: Solo Live Rolling Tide Records 1994
- Be Here Again: Solo Live Rolling Tide Records 1998
- Acoustic Live: The WFUV Concert Rolling Tide Records 2000
- Solo Live in Bethlehem Rolling Tide Records 2002
- Good Soul Food – Live at the Ark Rolling Tide Records 2004
- It's Been a Long Time: Live Acoustic with Paul Errico Rolling Tide Records 2006
- Best of the Downloads Vols. 1 + 2 (live compilation) Rolling Tide Records 2008
- Meridian CD/DVD Rolling Tide Records 2008
- Don't Look Down Rolling Tide Records 2011
- Get Your Motor Running Rolling Tide Records 2012
- Early On: The Best of the Mississippi Recordings Rolling Tide Records 2012
- Palladium (live in New York on November 24, 1979) Rolling Tide Records 2013
- New Liberty Half Vol. 1 (pre-production demos for The Place and the Time) Rolling Tide Records 2013
- A Safe Past Tense (studio demos from Over with You) Rolling Tide Records 2015

== See also ==
- List of 1970s one-hit wonders in the United States
