= Thinking (disambiguation) =

Thinking is the act of thought.

Thinking may also refer to:

== Literature ==
- Thinking (poem), by Walter D. Wintle

== Music ==
- "Thinking" (album), studio album by Zico 2019
- "Thinking" (song), single by Roger Daltrey 1973
- "Thinkin'", song and single by Jesse Lee Turner 1960
- "Thinkin'", song by The Corsairs 1961
- "Thinkin'", song by Compost from Compost (album) 1971
- "Thinkin'", song by Ronnie Wood from Slide on This 1992
- "Thinkin'", song by Steve Forbert from Alive on Arrival 1978
- "Thinkin'", song by Apathy from Wanna Snuggle? 2009
- "Thinkin'", song by 3T
- "Thinkin'", song by Miley Cyrus from Younger Now 2017
