= Romeo's Tune =

Single by Steve Forbert

from the album Jackrabbit Slim
- B-side: "Make It All So Real"
- Released: December 1979
- Recorded: 1979
- Genre: Soft rock
- Label: Nemperor
- Songwriter: Steve Forbert
- Producer: John Simon

Steve Forbert singles chronology
"Thinkin'" (1979)	"Romeo's Tune" (1979)	"Say Goodbye to Little Jo" (1980)

"Romeo's Tune" is a song recorded by Steve Forbert, released in 1979 as the lead single from his album Jackrabbit Slim.

The song became an international hit during the winter of 1980. "Romeo's Tune" did best in Canada, where it became a top 10 hit. It remains Forbert's only major charting single.

== Lyrical content ==
The song speaks of fading away from the world in the company of your lover. The title does not appear in the lyrics.

== Instrumentation ==
The distinctive piano lick on "Romeo's Tune" was done by former Elvis Presley pianist Bobby Ogdin, a well-known Nashville session piano player. In live performances, Forbert plays the lick on a neck-mounted harmonica.

== Use in media ==
"Romeo's Tune" is featured on the soundtracks of the 2001 movie Knockaround Guys, the 2016 movie Everybody Wants Some!! and the 2025 movie Splitsville

== Chart history ==
=== Weekly charts ===
Chart (1979–80)	Peak position
Australia (Kent Music Report)	13
Canada RPM Top Singles	8
Canada RPM Adult Contemporary	8
Italy FIMI	30
New Zealand	21
South Africa (Springbok Radio)	10
U.S. Billboard Hot 100	11
U.S. Billboard Adult Contemporary	13
U.S. Cash Box Top 100	11

=== Year-end charts ===
Chart (1980)	Rank
Australia (Kent Music Report)	87
Canada Top Singles (RPM)	47
Italy FIMI	95
U.S. Billboard Hot 100	60
U.S. Cash Box	88

== See also ==
- List of 1970s one-hit wonders in the United States
