= Streets of This Town =

Studio album by Steve Forbert
- Released: 1988
- Studio: Shorefire, Long Branch, New Jersey
- Genre: Rock
- Length: 38:15
- Label: Geffen
- Producer: Garry Tallent

Steve Forbert chronology
Steve Forbert (1982)	Streets of This Town (1988)	The American in Me (1992)

Streets of This Town is an album by the American musician Steve Forbert, released in 1988. Streets of This Town was Forbert's first album in six years and his first with Geffen Records. It was produced by Garry Tallent.

== Critical reception ==
The Gazette wrote that "the choked country twang of Forbert's voice is what imparts life to this material." The Toronto Star noted that "Forbert's still a rigidly stylized performer, still something of a follower and not an innovator ... and still terminally cute and adolescent." Americana UK wrote, "Present within the songs are anger and bitterness but also hope and love with a unique philosophical twist that is uniquely Forbert."

== Track listing ==
All Songs Written by Steve Forbert

1. "Running on Love" – 3:32
2. "Don't Tell Me (I Know)" – 3:33
3. "I Blinked Once" – 5:08
4. "Mexico" – 3:30
5. "As We Live and Breathe" – 3:18
6. "On the Streets of This Town" – 3:39
7. "Hope, Faith and Love" – 3:41
8. "Perfect Stranger" – 3:33
9. "Wait a Little Longer" – 3:45
10. "Search Your Heart" – 4:38

== Personnel ==
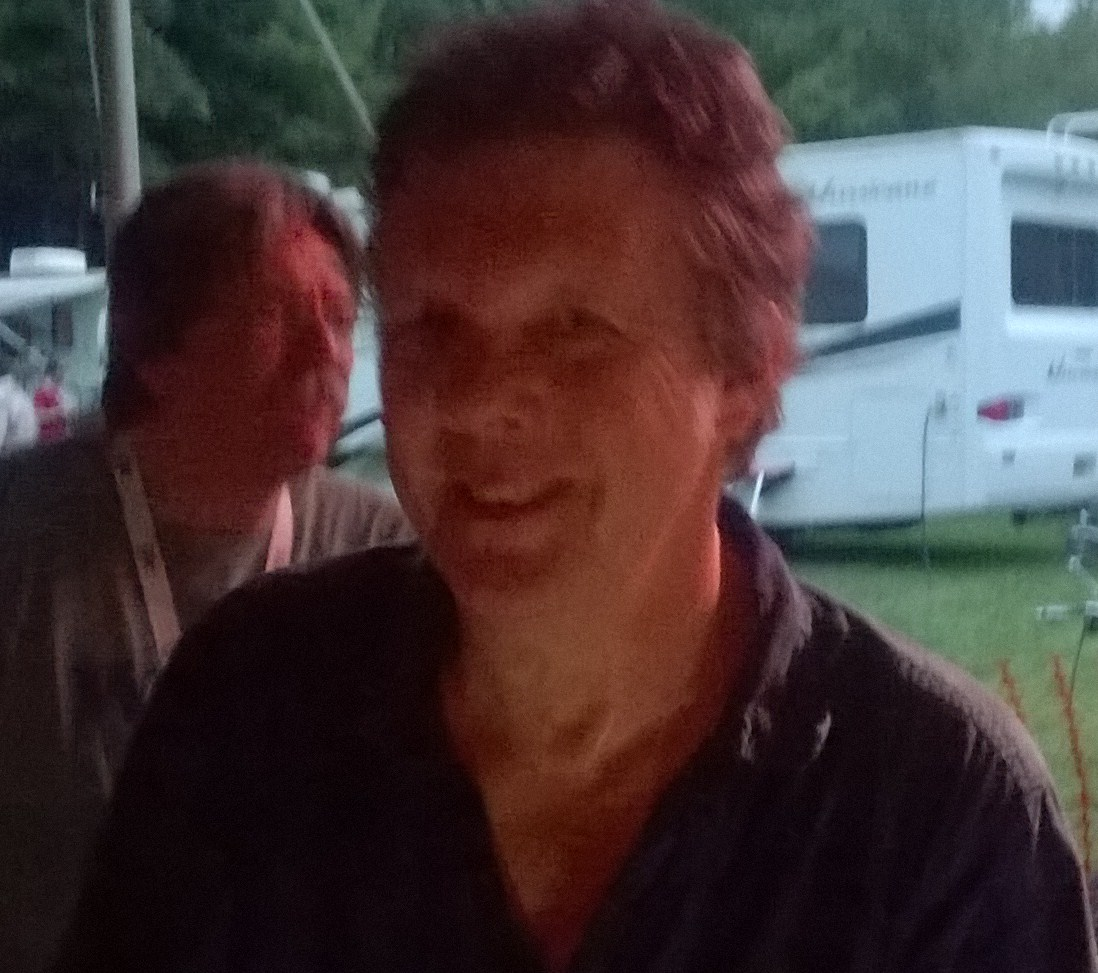
Steve Forbert

- Steve Forbert – vocals, acoustic guitar, harmonica, lead guitar on (2) & (9)
- Clay Barnes – lead guitar, backing vocals
- Danny Counts – bass
- Paul Errico – keyboards, backing vocals
- Bobby Lloyd Hicks – drums, percussion, backing vocals

with:

- Nils Lofgren – electric guitar on (9)
- Ernest Carter – percussion on (2)

Technical

- Garry Tallent – producer
- Jan Topoleski – engineer
- Jeff Morris – design, photography
- Lee Thomas – photography
