= Mission of the Crossroad Palms =

Studio album by Steve Forbert
- Released: 1995
- Studio: Moondog
- Genre: Folk rock
- Label: Paladin/Giant
- Producer: Garry Tallent

Steve Forbert chronology
The American in Me (1992)	Mission of the Crossroad Palms (1995)	Rocking Horse Head (1996)

Mission of the Crossroad Palms is an album by the American musician Steve Forbert, released in 1995. It was a commercial disappointment.

== Production ==
Mission of the Crossroad Palms was produced by Garry Tallent; it was his second time producing Forbert. The album was recorded in less than a week, and followed Forbert and Tallent's work on a song for the Harry Nilsson tribute album For the Love of Harry: Everybody Sings Nilsson. Benmont Tench played on Mission. Its lyrics deal with the regrets and realities of middle age.

== Critical reception ==
Professional ratings
Review scores
Source	Rating
AllMusic	3/5 stars
Calgary Herald	B+
The Encyclopedia of Popular Music	3/5 stars
MusicHound Rock: The Essential Album Guide	3/5 stars
Orlando Sentinel	4/5 stars
The Province	3.5/4 stars

Labeling Mission of the Crossroad Palms "the latest of Steve Forbert's mediocre comeback albums," Stereo Review wrote that, "while he still has a graceful way with a melody, Forbert has virtually nothing to say." The Pittsburgh Post-Gazette thought that the album "derives most of its energy from Forbert's mastery of broad musical arrangements and nuanced phrasing that insinuates itself with each successive play." The Philadelphia Inquirer concluded that the "folk-rock tunes ... sometimes match John Prine for lyrical inventiveness."

The Orlando Sentinel wrote that "Forbert often sounds as if he's forcibly squeezing the sounds out of his throat, but his baritone is nice and warm nonetheless." The Chicago Tribune determined that the album "finds the high-pitched, raspy-voiced singer-songwriter couching his searching, midlife lyrics in thoughtful folk-rock arrangements." The Province praised the "conscientious, heartfelt observations" and "attention to simple craftsmanship." The Calgary Herald deemed it "arguably his best."

AllMusic wrote that Forbert "has flowered into a distinctive, broad-based songwriter."

== Track listing ==
All tracks are written by Steve Forbert.

No.	Title	Length
1.	"It Sure Was Better Back Then"	2:57
2.	"It Is What It Is (And That's All)"	3:31
3.	"Is It Any Wonder?"	3:20
4.	"Lay Down Your Weary Tune Again"	3:08
5.	"So Good to Feel Good Again"	2:56
6.	"Oh, To Be Back with You"	4:41
7.	"Real Live Love"	3:48
8.	"The Trouble with Angels"	3:50
9.	"How Can You Change the World?"	3:01
10.	"Don't Talk to Me"	2:33
11.	"The Last Days of Sunlight"	3:35
12.	"Thirteen Blood Red Rosebuds"	2:39
Total length:		39:59

== Personnel ==
Compiled from the album's liner notes.

Musicians

- Steve Forbert – vocals, acoustic guitar, harmonica
- Clay Barnes – electric guitar, acoustic guitar on track 4
- Roger Clark – drums
- Gary Tallent – Bass
- Benmont Tench – keyboards

Additional musicians

- Dianne Davidson – backing vocals on track 5
- Donna McElroy – backing vocals on track 7
- Billy Hullett – acoustic guitar on track 2, electric guitar on track 5
- Tom Roady – percussion
- Glen Caruba – congas on track 5

Technical

- Produced by Gary Tallent
- Mixed by Richard Dodd at Moondog Studio, Nashville
- Recorded by Tim Coates at Moondog Studio, Nashville
- Mastered by Greg Calbi at Masterdisk, New York, NY
- Photography by Richard Litt
- Additional Photography by Baxter Buck
