= Jackrabbit Slim =

Studio album by Steve Forbert
- Released: 1979
- Studios: Quadraphonic, Nashville, Tennessee
- Genres: Folk rock, country rock
- Length: 43:17
- Label: Nemperor
- Producer: John Simon

Steve Forbert chronology
| Alive on Arrival (1978) | Jackrabbit Slim (1979) | Little Stevie Orbit (1980) |

Jackrabbit Slim is the second album by singer-songwriter Steve Forbert, released in 1979. It includes his biggest hit single, "Romeo's Tune", which peaked at No. 11 on the Billboard singles chart. The album rose to No. 20 on the Billboard albums chart. First pressings included a bonus one-sided 7-inch single of "The Oil Song".

== Critical reception ==
Professional ratings
Review scores
| Source | Rating |
|---|---|
| AllMusic | 4.5/5 stars |
| Christgau's Record Guide | B− |
| The Encyclopedia of Popular Music | 3/5 stars |
| Music Week | 3/4 stars |
| The Rolling Stone Album Guide | 2.5/5 stars |

The New York Times wrote that the album "fits Mr. Forbert's huskily insinuating folk-rock tenor into a confident, slightly slick country-rock backing."

== Track listing ==
All songs written by Steve Forbert.

1. "Romeo's Tune" – 3:28
2. "The Sweet Love That You Give (Sure Goes a Long, Long Way)" – 3:35
3. "I'm in Love with You" – 4:47
4. "Say Goodbye to Little Jo" – 3:52
5. "Wait" – 5:31
6. "Make It All So Real" – 5:54
7. "Baby" – 4:12
8. "Complications" – 3:41
9. "Sadly Sorta Like a Soap Opera" – 3:40
10. "January 23–30, 1978" – 4:37

== Charts ==
=== Weekly charts ===
| Chart (1979–1980) | Peak position |
|---|---|
| Australian (Kent Music Report) | 22 |
| Canada Top Albums/CDs (RPM) | 21 |
| New Zealand Albums (RMNZ) | 25 |
| UK Albums (Official Charts) | 54 |
| US Billboard 200 | 20 |

=== Year-end charts ===
| Chart (1980) | Position |
|---|---|
| Canada Top Albums/CDs (RPM) | 79 |
| US Billboard 200 | 84 |

== Personnel ==
- Steve Forbert – lead vocals, guitar, harmonica
- Bobby Ogdin – piano
- Paul Errico – organ, accordion
- John Goin – lead guitar
- Alan Freedman – guitar (8)
- Roger Clark – drums
- Gunnar Gelotte – drums (5, 6, 7)
- Bob Wray – bass (1, 3 ,4 ,8)
- Jack Williams – bass (5, 7, 10)
- Jerry Bridges – bass (2, 9)
- Mike Leech – bass (6)
- Bill Jones – saxophone
- Ron Keller – trumpet
- Dennis Good – trombone
- The Shoals Sisters (Ava Aldridge, Cindy Richardson, Marie Tomlinson) – backing vocals

Production

- Producer – John Simon
- Engineer – Gene Eichelberger
- Assistant engineers – Willie Pevear, James Stroud, Connie Potter
- Recorded at Quadraphonic Sound, Nashville
- Mastered by George Marino
- Design – Paula Scher
- Photography – Benno Friedman
