= Alive on Arrival =

Studio album by Steve Forbert
- Released: 1978
- Recorded: 1977
- Studios: A&R Studio R1, New York
- Genre: Pop
- Length: 38:18
- Label: Nemperor
- Producer: Steve Burgh

Steve Forbert chronology
Alive on Arrival (1978)	Jackrabbit Slim (1979)

Professional ratings
Review scores
Source	Rating
AllMusic	4/5 stars
Christgau's Record Guide	B
The Encyclopedia of Popular Music	3/5 stars
The Rolling Stone Album Guide	3/5 stars

Alive on Arrival is the first album by the American singer-songwriter Steve Forbert, released in 1978.

== Track listing ==
All songs written by Steve Forbert

1. "Goin' Down to Laurel" – 4:39
2. "Steve Forbert's Midsummer Night's Toast" – 2:49
3. "Thinkin'" – 3:25
4. "What Kinda Guy?" – 2:34
5. "It Isn't Gonna Be That Way" – 4:55
6. "Big City Cat" – 3:50
7. "Grand Central Station, March 18, 1977" – 4:13
8. "Tonight I Feel So Far Away from Home" – 3:14
9. "Settle Down" – 3:46
10. "You Cannot Win If You Do Not Play" – 4:33

== Personnel ==
- Steve Forbert – guitar, harmonica, vocals
- David Sanborn – alto saxophone on "Big City Cat"
- Brian Torff – acoustic bass on "Tonight I Feel So Far from Home"
- Steve Burgh – lead guitar
- Dennis Good – trombone
- Robbie Kondor – organ, piano
- Barry Lazarowitz – drums, tambourine
- Hugh McDonald – bass; electric guitar on "What Kinda Guy?"
- Harvey Shapiro – pedal steel

Technical

- Glenn Berger, Charles Clifton – engineer
- Danny Fields – front cover photography

== Charts ==
Chart (1979)	Peak position
Canada Top Albums/CDs (RPM)	49
UK Albums (Official Charts)	56
US Billboard 200	82
