= The Best of Steve Forbert: What Kinda Guy? =

Compilation album by Steve Forbert
- Released: 1993
- Genre: Pop
- Length: 76:59
- Labels: Nemperor, Epic Associated, CBS, Legacy
- Producers: Steve Burgh, John Simon, Pete Solley, Neil Geraldo (also known as Neil "Spyder" Giraldo)

Professional ratings
Review scores
Source	Rating
AllMusic	4/5 stars

The Best of Steve Forbert: What Kinda Guy? is a compilation album by singer/songwriter Steve Forbert. It was released by Sony Legacy in 1993. It collects 14 tracks from Forbert's first four studio albums, recorded for Nemperor, a CBS imprint at the time, four live tracks from the eighties and one previously unreleased track, "Samson and Delilah's Beauty Shop".

== Track listing ==
All songs written by Steve Forbert

1. "What Kinda Guy?" – 2:37
2. "Romeo's Tune" – 3:32
3. "Ya Ya (Next to Me)" – 3:48
4. "Cellophane City" – 5:36
5. "Song for Katrina" – 3:33
6. "The Sweet Love That You Give (Sure Goes A Long Long Way)" – 3:39
7. "I'm in Love with You" – 4:44
8. "Complications [live]" – 3:52
9. "You Cannot Win If You Do Not Play [live]" – 3:01
10. "Thinkin' [live]" – 4:04
11. "Goin' Down to Laurel" – 5:02
12. "January 23–30, 1978" – 4:27
13. "Get Well Soon" – 3:55
14. "Schoolgirl [live]" – 3:01
15. "Samson and Delilah's Beauty Shop" – 3:43
16. "The Oil Song" – 6:25
17. "Listen to Me" – 4:12
18. "Steve Forbert's Midsummer Night's Toast" – 2:50
19. "It Isn't Gonna Be That Way" – 4:58
