= Think tank (disambiguation) =

A think tank is an organization that conducts research and engages in advocacy.

Think Tank or Thinktank may also refer to:

== Organisations ==
- Thinktank, Birmingham Science Museum, a science museum in Birmingham, England

== Film and television ==
- Think Tank (film), a 2006 film
- Think Tank with Ben Wattenberg or Think Tank, a 1994–2010 discussion/talk television program, hosted by Ben Wattenberg, that aired on PBS
- Think Tank (game show), a 2016 BBC quiz show - not to be confused with the 1995 Channel 4 game show
  - Think Tank (Australian game show), an Australian version of the BBC quiz show, first broadcast in 2018
- "Think Tank" (Star Trek: Voyager), an episode of Star Trek: Voyager

== Comics ==
- Think Tank (comics), a 2012 limited series from Image by Matt Hawkins and Rahsan Ekedal
- Think Tank (Marvel Comics), a Marvel Comics superhero, member of Freedom Force
- Think Tank, a temporary alias adopted by the Marvel Comics supervillain HourGlass

== Music ==
- Think Tank (band), featuring members of the band Information Society
- Think Tank (Blur album), a 2003 album by Blur
- Think Tank (Henry Rollins album), a 1998 spoken word recording by Henry Rollins
- Think Tank (Pat Martino album), 2003

== Other uses ==
- ThinkTank, the original name for the outliner app later known as MORE
- Think tank, a descriptive name for a Tachikoma in the anime and manga Ghost in the Shell
- ThinkTank, a daily YouTube news and culture show on The Young Turks network
- Think tank, a common term for time-out settings in classrooms
- Think Tanks, a vehicular combat game
