= Ken Smith (architect) =

American landscape architect

Ken Smith (born 1953) is an American landscape architect.

== Biography ==
Kenneth W. Smith was born in Waukee, Iowa, and attended Iowa State University, where he graduated with a Bachelor of Landscape Architecture in 1976. After graduation, he apprenticed with sculptor Paul Shao, and worked for the Iowa Conservation Commission in Parks and Recreation Planning. He attended the Harvard Graduate School of Design, and received his Master in Landscape Architecture in 1986.

After working in the office of Peter Walker and Martha Schwartz, he opened his own office, Ken Smith Workshop in New York City in 1992. Smith is active as an educator, teaching as an adjunct professor at the City College of New York from 1992 to 1996, and as a visiting design critic at the Harvard Graduate School of Design from 1997 to the present.

In 2012, Smith was honored as a Fellow of the American Society of Landscape Architects. In addition, Smith is also a board member of the Architectural League of New York and is active in advocating preservation of modern works of landscape architecture.

Smith was the recipient of the 2011 Christian Petersen Design Award presented by the Iowa State University College of Design. He is well known for his work on the Roof Garden of New York City's Museum of Modern Art, which consists of white gravel, recycled black rubber, crushed glass, sculptural stones and artificial boxwood plants in a camouflage pattern.

Smith was a member of the THINK Team in the World Trade Center competition in 2002. Smith was awarded a major commission for Orange County Great Park, a 1,300-acre (530 ha) urban park on the decommissioned El Toro Marine Base in Orange County, California.

Ken is responsible for the landscape architecture of the World One project in Mumbai, India.
