= Thunk (disambiguation) =

A thunk is type of computer software subroutine.

Thunk may also refer to:

- Thunk, a character from the animated TV series Dawn of the Croods
- "Thunk", a track from the 1971 album Bark by Jefferson Airplane
- "Thunk", a 1990 album by American rock band Eleven

== See also ==
- "Thunk in the Trunk", an episode of the American sitcom Modern Family
