= Think! (short story) =

Short story by Isaac Asimov

"Think!" is a science fiction short story by American writer Isaac Asimov, first appeared in Isaac Asimov's Science Fiction Magazine in its first issue (Spring 1977). It also appeared in the collections The Complete Robot and Robot Visions.

== Plot summary ==
Genevieve Renshaw summons her colleagues, James Berkowitz and Adam Orsino, to show a new discovery that has kept her busy enough for her to ignore all of her other work. She has been able to advance the science of the electroencephalogram by applications of a laser. She compares the current technology in that area to listening to all of the people on two and a half Earths, as not much can be discovered from this listening. Her laser electroencephalogram (LEG) can scan each individual brain cell so rapidly that there is no temperature change, and yet more information is given. She successfully tests this on a marmoset and later Orsino, and then realizes that the LEG allows telepathy. The story ends revealing that the LEG also allows people to talk to computers as independent intelligences, or from person to person.

== See also ==
- Isaac Asimov short stories bibliography
