= THINK Team =

The THINK Team was a team that consisted of architects, landscape architects, engineers, interactive designers and others who developed several designs for the Lower Manhattan Development Corporation's "Innovative Design Study" that was created in order to involve the public in a creative process to redevelop the World Trade Center site in New York City, after it was destroyed in the September 11, 2001 terrorist attacks.

After a competition that lasted more than six months and included major architecture practices from around the world, the Lower Manhattan Development Corporation (the agency charged with coordinating the reconstruction of the World Trade Center site) selected the THINK Team's design for a pair of open lattice work towers that would recall the image of the Twin Towers while memorializing the tragedy, reconstructing the skyline and unburdening the area of office space for which there is no demand even today. Although the design would have created a sort of Eiffel Tower experience in the heart of downtown, could have been completed by the 2006 anniversary of the attack, and had a compelling economic argument behind it, the commitment to a civic gesture on such a grand scale was rejected by Governor George Pataki who overruled the committee he himself impanelled to make the decision. The design by Daniel Libeskind, which was more easily subsumed by the incumbent commercial interests at the site, was selected instead.

The book "THINK New York: A Diary of Ground Zero" recounts the complete experience of the team members and the evolution of the work they presented throughout the process. The book is a first hand account created by Román Viñoly, the THINK Team's communications director and written with Hilary Lewis.

The team consisted of:

- Frederic Schwartz (founder)
- Rafael Viñoly
- Shigeru Ban
- Ken Smith

Contributors were:

- David Rockwell

Engineers were:

- ARUP
- Buro Happold
