= Billboard Top Country Hits =

The cover of the 1959 edition of Billboard Top Country Hits

Billboard Top Country Hits is a series of compilation albums released by Rhino Records, each featuring ten hit country music recordings from a specific year, mostly number ones on the Billboard country singles chart. In all, 15 albums were released spanning the years 1959–1968 (released in 1990) and 1986–1990 (released in 1993). The series skips the years 1969-1985. There are no volumes for 1969-1977 (1991) and 1978-1985 (1992).

== 1959 ==
Billboard Top Country Hits: 1959

Compilation album by various artists
- Released: June 12, 1990
- Recorded: 1959
- Genre: Country
- Length: 25:37
- Label: Rhino

Professional ratings
Review scores
Source	Rating
AllMusic	4.5/5 stars

The first volume, covering the year of 1959, contains seven tracks that reached No. 1 on the Billboard Hot C&W Sides chart, with the remaining three tracks all peaking in the top five.

- Track information and credits taken from the album's liner notes.

No.	Title	Writer(s)	Artist	Length
1.	"The Battle of New Orleans"	James Corbitt Morris	Johnny Horton	2:35
2.	"Don't Take Your Guns to Town"	Johnny Cash	Johnny Cash	3:05
3.	"Billy Bayou"	Roger Miller	Jim Reeves	2:07
4.	"I Ain't Never"	Mel Tillis; Webb Pierce	Webb Pierce	1:57
5.	"White Lightning"	Jiles Perry Richardson	George Jones	2:49
6.	"Waterloo"	John D. Loudermilk; Marijohn Wilkin	Stonewall Jackson	2:30
7.	"The Three Bells (Les Trois Cloches)"	Jean Villard; Bert Reisfeld	The Browns	2:52
8.	"Under Your Spell Again"	Buck Owens; Dusty Rhodes	Buck Owens	2:45
9.	"Country Girl"	Roy Drusky	Faron Young	2:37
10.	"There's a Big Wheel"	Don Gibson	Wilma Lee & Stoney Cooper	2:20
Total length:				25:37

== 1960 ==
Billboard Top Country Hits: 1960

Compilation album by various artists
- Released: June 12, 1990
- Recorded: 1960
- Genre: Country
- Length: 28:35
- Label: Rhino

Professional ratings
Review scores
Source	Rating
AllMusic	4.5/5 stars

Four of the tracks included on this album reached No. 1 on the Billboard Hot C&W Sides chart during 1960. One of the tracks — "El Paso" by Marty Robbins, was also a chart topper on the Billboard Hot 100. Also included in the track lineup is the year's No. 1 song, "Please Help Me I'm Falling" by Hank Locklin. The remaining six tracks all peaked in the top ten.

- Track information and credits taken from the album's liner notes.

No.	Title	Writer(s)	Artist	Length
1.	"El Paso"	Marty Robbins	Marty Robbins	4:42
2.	"Wings of a Dove"	Bob Ferguson	Ferlin Husky	2:22
3.	"Just One Time"	Don Gibson	Don Gibson	2:46
4.	"He'll Have to Go"	Joe Allison; Audrey Allison	Jim Reeves	2:21
5.	"He'll Have to Stay"	Joe Allison; Audrey Allison; Charles Grean	Jeanne Black	2:45
6.	"Sink the Bismarck"	Johnny Horton; Tillman Franks	Johnny Horton	3:15
7.	"Please Help Me, I'm Falling"	Hal Blair; Don Robertson	Hank Locklin	2:25
8.	"(I Can't Help You) I'm Falling Too"	Hal Blair; Don Robertson; Skeeter Davis	Skeeter Davis	2:46
9.	"Excuse Me (I Think I've Got a Heartache)"	Buck Owens; Harlan Howard	Buck Owens	2:29
10.	"One More Time"	Mel Tillis	Ray Price	2:44
Total length:				28:35

== 1961 ==
Billboard Top Country Hits: 1961

Compilation album by various artists
- Released: June 12, 1990
- Recorded: 1961
- Genre: Country
- Length: 26:51
- Label: Rhino

Professional ratings
Review scores
Source	Rating
AllMusic	4.5/5 stars

Seven of the tracks included on this album reached No. 1 on the Billboard Hot Country Singles chart during 1961, including the year's No. 1 song, "I Fall to Pieces" by Patsy Cline. Also included is "Big Bad John" by Jimmy Dean, a crossover hit which spent five weeks atop the Billboard Hot 100. The other three tracks all peaked in the top ten of the country chart.

- Track information and credits taken from the album's liner notes.

No.	Title	Writer(s)	Artist	Length
1.	"Walk on By"	Kendall Hayes; Gary Walker	Leroy Van Dyke	2:22
2.	"Big Bad John"	Roy Acuff; Jimmy Dean	Jimmy Dean	3:03
3.	"Don't Worry"	Marty Robbins	Marty Robbins	3:17
4.	"Hello Walls"	Willie Nelson	Faron Young	2:26
5.	"North to Alaska"	Johnny Horton; Tillman Franks	Johnny Horton	2:52
6.	"I Fall to Pieces"	Hank Cochran; Harlan Howard	Patsy Cline	2:51
7.	"Sea of Heartbreak"	Paul Hampton; Hal David	Don Gibson	2:35
8.	"Tender Years"	George Jones; Darrell Edwards	George Jones	2:25
9.	"Foolin' Around"	Buck Owens; Harlan Howard	Buck Owens	2:40
10.	"San Antonio Rose"	Bob Wills	Floyd Cramer	2:20
Total length:				26:51

== 1962 ==
Billboard Top Country Hits: 1962

Compilation album by various artists
- Released: June 12, 1990
- Recorded: 1962
- Genre: Country
- Length: 28:49
- Label: Rhino

Professional ratings
Review scores
Source	Rating
AllMusic	4.5/5 stars

Five of the tracks included on this album reached No. 1 on the Billboard Hot Country Singles chart during 1962, including the year's No. 1 song, "Wolverton Mountain" by Claude King. The other five tracks all peaked in the top five.

- Track information and credits taken from the album's liner notes.

No.	Title	Writer(s)	Artist	Length
1.	"Wolverton Mountain"	Claude King; Merle Kilgore	Claude King	2:59
2.	"She's Got You"	Hank Cochran	Patsy Cline	3:03
3.	"Devil Woman"	Marty Robbins	Marty Robbins	2:53
4.	"Old Rivers"	Cliff Crofford	Walter Brennan	2:49
5.	"Don't Go Near the Indians"	Lorene Mann	Rex Allen	3:07
6.	"I've Been Everywhere"	Geoff Mack	Hank Snow	2:49
7.	"Crazy"	Willie Nelson	Patsy Cline	2:44
8.	"She Thinks I Still Care"	Dickey Lee; Steve Duffy	George Jones	2:38
9.	"P.T. 109"	Fred Burch; Marijohn Wilkin	Jimmy Dean	3:15
10.	"Adios Amigo"	Ralph Freed; Jerry Livingston	Jim Reeves	2:32
Total length:				28:49

== 1963 ==
Billboard Top Country Hits: 1963

Compilation album by various artists
- Released: June 12, 1990
- Recorded: 1963
- Genre: Country
- Length: 24:24
- Label: Rhino

Professional ratings
Review scores
Source	Rating
AllMusic	4.5/5 stars

Seven of the tracks included on this album reached No. 1 on the Billboard Hot Country Singles chart during 1963, including the year's No. 1 song, "Still" by Bill Anderson. The other three tracks all peaked in the Top 5.

- Track information and credits taken from the album's liner notes.

No.	Title	Writer(s)	Artist	Length
1.	"Ring of Fire"	June Carter; Merle Kilgore	Johnny Cash	2:39
2.	"From a Jack to a King"	Ned Miller	Ned Miller	2:13
3.	"Love's Gonna Live Here"	Buck Owens	Buck Owens	2:02
4.	"Ruby Ann"	Lee Emerson; Rashima Bellamy; Roberta Bellamy	Marty Robbins	2:02
5.	"The End of the World"	Arthur Kent; Sylvia Dee	Skeeter Davis	2:40
6.	"Abilene"	Don Gibson; John D. Loudermilk	George Hamilton IV	2:14
7.	"Six Days on the Road"	Earl Green; Carl Montgomery	Dave Dudley	2:24
8.	"Act Naturally"	Johnny Russell; Voni Morrison	Buck Owens	2:24
9.	"Don't Let Me Cross Over"	Penny Jay	Carl Butler and Pearl	2:59
10.	"Still"	Bill Anderson	Bill Anderson	2:47
Total length:				24:24

== 1964 ==
Billboard Top Country Hits: 1964

Compilation album by Various artists
- Released: October 17, 1990
- Recorded: 1963
- Genre: Country
- Length: 24:04
- Label: Rhino

Professional ratings
Review scores
Source	Rating
AllMusic	4.5/5 stars

Eight of the tracks included on this album reached No. 1 on the Billboard Hot Country Singles chart during 1964, including the year's No. 1 song, "My Heart Skips a Beat" by Buck Owens. The other two tracks — "Chug-A-Lug" by Roger Miller and "The Race Is On" by George Jones — peaked in the top five.

- Track information and credits taken from the album's liner notes.

No.	Title	Writer(s)	Artist	Length
1.	"Once a Day"	Bill Anderson	Connie Smith	2:21
2.	"Understand Your Man"	Johnny Cash	Johnny Cash	2:42
3.	"Dang Me"	Roger Miller	Roger Miller	1:52
4.	"Saginaw, Michigan"	Bill Anderson; Don Wayne	Lefty Frizzell	3:05
5.	"My Heart Skips a Beat"	Buck Owens	Buck Owens	2:27
6.	"The Race Is On"	Don Rollins	George Jones	2:09
7.	"I Guess I'm Crazy"	Werly Fairburn	Jim Reeves	2:27
8.	"Chug-a-Lug"	Roger Miller	Roger Miller	2:06
9.	"Together Again"	Buck Owens	Buck Owens	2:27
10.	"Begging to You"	Marty Robbins	Marty Robbins	2:28
Total length:				24:04

== 1965 ==
Billboard Top Country Hits: 1965

Compilation album by various artists
- Released: August 17, 1990
- Recorded: 1965
- Genre: Country
- Length: 25:00
- Label: Rhino

Professional ratings
Review scores
Source	Rating
AllMusic	3/5 stars

Eight of the tracks included on this album reached No. 1 on the Billboard Hot Country Singles chart during 1965. The other two tracks — "Truck Drivin' Son-of-a-Gun" by Dave Dudley and "I'll Keep Holding On (Just to Your Love)" by Sonny James — peaked in the top five.

- Track information and credits taken from the album's liner notes.

No.	Title	Writer(s)	Artist	Length
1.	"King of the Road"	Roger Miller	Roger Miller	2:28
2.	"I've Got a Tiger by the Tail"	Harlan Howard; Buck Owens	Buck Owens	3:13
3.	"I'll Keep Holding On (Just to Your Love)"	Robert F. Tubert; Sonny James	Sonny James	2:21
4.	"Girl on the Billboard"	Hank Mills; Walter Haynes	Del Reeves	2:44
5.	"Truck Drivin' Son-of-a-Gun"	Iris Buswell; Joseph R. Phillips	Dave Dudley	2:12
6.	"Make the World Go Away"	Hank Cochran	Eddy Arnold	2:41
7.	"Before You Go"	Don Rich; Buck Owens	Buck Owens	2:11
8.	"Behind the Tear"	Ned Miller; Sue Miller	Sonny James	2:04
9.	"This Is It"	Cindy Walker	Jim Reeves	3:08
10.	"Buckaroo"	Bob Morris	Buck Owens & His Buckaroos	1:58
Total length:				25:00

== 1966 ==
Billboard Top Country Hits: 1966

Compilation album by various artists
- Released: August 17, 1990
- Recorded: 1966
- Genre: Country
- Length: 25:08
- Label: Rhino

Professional ratings
Review scores
Source	Rating
AllMusic	4.5/5 stars

Eight of the tracks included on this album reached No. 1 on the Billboard Hot Country Singles chart during 1966, including the year's No. 1 song, "Almost Persuaded" by David Houston. The other two tracks — "You Ain't Woman Enough" by Loretta Lynn and "Tippy-Toeing" by the Harden Trio — peaked at No. 2.

- Track information and credits taken from the album's liner notes.

No.	Title	Writer(s)	Artist	Length
1.	"There Goes My Everything"	Dallas Frazier	Jack Greene	2:36
2.	"I Get the Fever"	Bill Anderson	Bil Anderson	2:22
3.	"Almost Persuaded"	Billy Sherrill; Glenn Sutton	David Houston	2:58
4.	"Waitin' in Your Welfare Line"	Buck Owens; Don Rich; Nat Stuckey	Buck Owens & His Buckaroos	2:21
5.	"Flowers on the Wall"	Lew DeWitt	The Statler Brothers	2:22
6.	"I Want to Go with You"	Hank Cochran	Eddy Arnold	2:43
7.	"You Ain't Woman Enough (To Take My Man)"	Loretta Lynn	Loretta Lynn	2:16
8.	"Distant Drums"	Cindy Walker	Jim Reeves	2:56
9.	"Take Good Care of Her"	Arthur Kent; Ed Warren	Sonny James	2:32
10.	"Tippy-Toeing"	Bobby Harden	The Harden Trio	2:02
Total length:				25:08

== 1967 ==
Billboard Top Country Hits: 1967

Compilation album by various artists
- Released: August 17, 1990
- Recorded: 1967
- Genre: Country
- Length: 25:29
- Label: Rhino

Professional ratings
Review scores
Source	Rating
AllMusic	3/5 stars

Each of the tracks on this album reached No. 1 on the Billboard Hot Country Singles chart during 1967. Included is the year's No. 1 song, "All the Time" by Jack Greene.

- Track information and credits taken from the album's liner notes.

No.	Title	Writer(s)	Artist	Length
1.	"All the Time"	Mel Tillis; Wayne P. Walker	Jack Greene	2:43
2.	"The Fugitive"	Liz Anderson; Casey Anderson	Merle Haggard	2:57
3.	"My Elusive Dreams"	Billy Sherrill; Curly Putman	David Houston & Tammy Wynette	2:52
4.	"Walk Through This World With Me"	Sandy Seamons; Kaye Savage	George Jones	2:19
5.	"For Loving You"	Steve Karliski; Rossini Pinto	Bill Anderson & Jan Howard	2:47
6.	"It's Such a Pretty World Today"	Dale Noe	Wynn Stewart	2:32
7.	"Sam's Place"	Joe Cecil "Red" Simpson; Buck Owens	Buck Owens & His Buckaroos	2:00
8.	"I Don't Wanna Play House"	Billy Sherrill; Glenn Sutton	Tammy Wynette	2:38
9.	"I'll Never Find Another You"	Tom Springfield	Sonny James	2:26
10.	"You Mean the World to Me"	Billy Sherrill; Glenn Sutton	David Houston	2:15
Total length:				25:29

== 1968 ==
Billboard Top Country Hits: 1968

Compilation album by various artists
- Released: August 17, 1990
- Recorded: 1968
- Genre: Country
- Length: 27:18
- Label: Rhino

Professional ratings
Review scores
Source	Rating
AllMusic	4.5/5 stars

Each of the tracks reached No. 1 on the Billboard Hot Country Singles chart during 1968. Included is the year's No. 1 song, "Folsom Prison Blues" by Johnny Cash. "Harper Valley PTA" by Jeannie C. Riley also was a No. 1 single on the Billboard Hot 100.

- Track information and credits taken from the album's liner notes.

No.	Title	Writer(s)	Artist	Length
1.	"Stand by Your Man"	Billy Sherrill; Tammy Wynette	Tammy Wynette	2:41
2.	"Heaven Says Hello"	Cindy Walker	Sonny James	2:06
3.	"Mama Tried"	Merle Haggard	Merle Haggard	2:13
4.	"Folsom Prison Blues"	Johnny Cash	Johnny Cash	2:46
5.	"Skip a Rope"	Jack Moran; Glenn D. Tubb	Henson Cargill	2:39
6.	"Wichita Lineman"	Jimmy Webb	Glen Campbell	3:09
7.	"Then You Can Tell Me Goodbye"	John D. Loudermilk	Eddy Arnold	2:50
8.	"Sing Me Back Home"	Merle Haggard	Merle Haggard	2:50
9.	"Next in Line"	Wayne Kemp; Curtis Wayne	Conway Twitty	2:53
10.	"Harper Valley PTA"	Tom T. Hall	Jeannie C. Riley	3:11
Total length:				27:18

== 1986 ==
Billboard Top Country Hits: 1986

Compilation album by various artists
- Released: October 19, 1993
- Recorded: 1986
- Genre: Country
- Length: 34:09
- Label: Rhino

Professional ratings
Review scores
Source	Rating
AllMusic	4.5/5 stars

Each of the tracks in this volume reached No. 1 on the Billboard Hot Country Singles chart during 1986 and early 1987.

- Track information and credits taken from the album's liner notes.

No.	Title	Writer(s)	Artist	Length
1.	"Mind Your Own Business" (with Reba McEntire, Tom Petty, Reverend Ike, and Willie Nelson)	Hank Williams	Hank Williams Jr.	2:26
2.	"Cajun Moon"	Jim Rushing	Ricky Skaggs	3:48
3.	"It'll Be Me"	J.P. Pennington; Sonny LeMaire	Exile	2:57
4.	"Hell and High Water"	Alex Harvey; T. Graham Brown	T. Graham Brown	3:14
5.	"Mornin' Ride"	Steve Bogard; Jeff Tweel	Lee Greenwood	3:24
6.	"Life's Highway"	Richard Leigh; Roger Murrah	Steve Wariner	3:17
7.	"Just Another Love"	Paul Davis	Tanya Tucker	3:14
8.	"You Still Move Me"	Dan Seals	Dan Seals	5:11
9.	"Strong Heart"	Austin Roberts; Charlie Black; Tommy Rocco	T. G. Sheppard	3:36
10.	"Got My Heart Set on You"	Dobie Gray; Bud Reneau	John Conlee	3:02
Total length:				34:09

== 1987 ==
Billboard Top Country Hits: 1987

Compilation album by various artists
- Released: October 19, 1993
- Recorded: 1987
- Genre: Country
- Length: 33:39
- Label: Rhino

Professional ratings
Review scores
Source	Rating
AllMusic	4.5/5 stars

Each of the tracks in this volume reached No. 1 on the Billboard Hot Country Singles chart during 1987 and early 1988.

- Track information and credits taken from the album's liner notes.

No.	Title	Writer(s)	Artist	Length
1.	"Forever and Ever, Amen"	Paul Overstreet; Don Schlitz	Randy Travis	3:31
2.	"Somewhere Tonight"	Harlan Howard; Rodney Crowell	Highway 101	3:17
3.	"Fishin' in the Dark"	Wendy Waldman; Jim Photoglo	Nitty Gritty Dirt Band	3:19
4.	"The Way We Make a Broken Heart"	John Hiatt	Rosanne Cash	3:55
5.	"You Again"	Paul Overstreet; Don Schlitz	The Forester Sisters	3:21
6.	"One Friend"	Dan Seals	Dan Seals	3:13
7.	"She's Too Good to Be True"	J.P. Pennington; Sonny LeMaire	Exile	3:38
8.	"The Weekend"	Bill LaBounty; Beckie Foster	Steve Wariner	3:51
9.	"Can't Stop My Heart from Loving You"	Jamie O'Hara; Kieran Kane	The O'Kanes	2:49
10.	"Born to Boogie"	Hank Williams Jr.	Hank Williams Jr.	2:45
Total length:				33:39

== 1988 ==
Billboard Top Country Hits: 1988

Compilation album by various artists
- Released: October 19, 1993
- Recorded: 1988
- Genre: Country
- Length: 32:56
- Label: Rhino

Professional ratings
Review scores
Source	Rating
AllMusic	4.5/5 stars

Each of the tracks in this volume reached No. 1 on the Billboard Hot Country Singles chart during 1988 and early 1989.

- Track information and credits taken from the album's liner notes.

No.	Title	Writer(s)	Artist	Length
1.	"I Couldn't Leave You If I Tried"	Rodney Crowell	Rodney Crowell	3:17
2.	"Set 'Em Up Joe"	Hank Cochran; Buddy Cannon; Dean Dillon; Vern Gosdin	Vern Gosdin	2:28
3.	"I Sang Dixie"	Dwight Yoakam	Dwight Yoakam	3:50
4.	"Hold Me"	K. T. Oslin	K. T. Oslin	4:01
5.	"When You Say Nothing at All"	Paul Overstreet; Don Schlitz	Keith Whitley	3:43
6.	"Strong Enough to Bend"	Beth Nielsen Chapman; Don Schlitz	Tanya Tucker	2:45
7.	"What I'd Say"	Robert Byrne; Will Robinson	Earl Thomas Conley	3:53
8.	"I Told You So"	Randy Travis	Randy Travis	3:40
9.	"Cry, Cry, Cry"	Don Devaney; John Scott Sherrill	Highway 101	2:31
10.	"Streets of Bakersfield"	Homer Joy	Dwight Yoakam & Buck Owens	2:48
Total length:				32:56

== 1989 ==
Billboard Top Country Hits: 1989

Compilation album by various artists
- Released: October 19, 1993
- Recorded: 1989
- Genre: Country
- Length: 34:04
- Label: Rhino

Professional ratings
Review scores
Source	Rating
AllMusic	4.5/5 stars

Each of the tracks in this volume reached No. 1 on the Billboard Hot Country Singles chart during 1989 and early 1990.

- Track information and credits taken from the album's liner notes.

No.	Title	Writer(s)	Artist	Length
1.	"The Church on Cumberland Road"	Bob DiPiero; John Scott Sherrill; Dennis Robbins	Shenandoah	3:02
2.	"I Got Dreams"	Bill LaBounty; Steve Wariner	Steve Wariner	3:52
3.	"Timber, I'm Falling in Love"	Kostas	Patty Loveless	2:32
4.	"I'm No Stranger to the Rain"	Sonny Curtis; Ron Hellard	Keith Whitley	3:37
5.	"It's Just a Matter of Time"	Brook Benton; Belford Hendricks; Clyde Otis	Randy Travis	3:58
6.	"A Woman in Love"	Doug Millett; Curtis Wright	Ronnie Milsap	3:16
7.	"Yellow Roses"	Dolly Parton	Dolly Parton	3:57
8.	"On Second Thought"	Eddie Rabbitt	Eddie Rabbitt	3:39
9.	"Who's Lonely Now"	Kix Brooks; Don Cook	Highway 101	3:25
10.	"Bayou Boys"	Eddy Raven; Troy Seals; Frank J. Myers	Eddy Raven	2:46
Total length:				34:04

== 1990 ==
Billboard Top Country Hits: 1990

Compilation album by various artists
- Released: October 19, 1993
- Recorded: 1990
- Genre: Country
- Length: 33:53
- Label: Rhino

Professional ratings
Review scores
Source	Rating
AllMusic	4.5/5 stars

Each of the tracks in this volume reached No. 1 on the Billboard Hot Country Singles chart during 1990 and early 1991.

- Track information and credits taken from the album's liner notes.

No.	Title	Writer(s)	Artist	Length
1.	"You Really Had Me Going"	Holly Dunn; Chris Waters; Tom Shapiro	Holly Dunn	2:50
2.	"Next to You, Next to Me"	Robert Ellis Orrall; Curtis Wright	Shenandoah	3:41
3.	"Walk on Faith"	Mike Reid; Allen Shamblin	Mike Reid	3:12
4.	"Hard Rock Bottom of Your Heart"	Hugh Prestwood	Randy Travis	4:06
5.	"Five Minutes"	Beth Nielsen Chapman	Lorrie Morgan	3:35
6.	"Jukebox in My Mind"	Dave Gibson; Ronnie Rogers	Alabama	3:33
7.	"Home"	Fred Lehner; Andy Spooner	Joe Diffie	3:21
8.	"Daddy's Come Around"	Paul Overstreet; Don Schlitz	Paul Overstreet	3:33
9.	"Chains"	Hal Bynum; Bud Reneau	Patty Loveless	2:29
10.	"Good Times"	Sam Cooke	Dan Seals	3:33
Total length:				33:53
