= Billboard Top Country Singles of 1964 =

This is a list of Billboard magazine's ranking of the year's top country singles of 1964.

Buck Owens had two of the top three singles with "My Heart Skips a Beat" (No. 1) and "Together Again" (No. 3). Owens had two additional No. 1 hits with "Love's Gonna Live Here" and "I Don't Care (Just as Long as You Love Me)".

Jim Reeves, who died in a plane crash in July 1964, also had two top five singles with "Welcome to My World" (No. 2) and "I Guess I'm Crazy" (No. 4).

Rank	Peak (Note: This column recites the record's peak position on Billboard's weekly charts.)	Title	Artist(s)	Label
1	1	"My Heart Skips a Beat"	Buck Owens	Capitol
2	2	"Welcome to My World"	Jim Reeves	RCA Victor
3	1	"Together Again"	Buck Owens	Capitol
4	1	"I Guess I'm Crazy"	Jim Reeves	RCA Victor
5	4	"I Don't Love You Anymore"	Charlie Louvin	Capitol
6	1	"Saginaw, Michigan"	Lefty Frizzell	Columbia
7	2	"Burning Memories"	Ray Price	Columbia
8	1	"Understand Your Man"	Johnny Cash	Columbia
9	1	"Dang Me"	Roger Miller	Smash
10	2	"Memory #1"	Webb Pierce	Decca
11	7	"This White Circle On My Finger"	Kitty Wells	Decca
12	4	"I Love to Dance with Annie"	Ernest Ashworth	Hickory
13	4	"Password"	Kitty Wells	Decca
14	5	"Keeping Up with the Joneses"	Faron Young and Margie Singleton	Mercury
15	3	"The Cowboy in the Continental Suit"	Marty Robbins	Columbia
16	3	"Wine, Women and Song"	Loretta Lynn	Decca
17	1	"B.J. the D.J."	Stonewall Jackson	Columbia
18	5	"Second Fiddle (To an Old Guitar)"	Jean Shepard	Capitol
19	1	"Begging to You"	Marty Robbins	Columbia
20	3	"The Ballad of Ira Hayes"	Johnny Cash	Columbia
21	1	"I Don't Care (Just as Long as You Love Me)"	Buck Owens	Capitol
22	7	"Looking for More in '64"	Jim Nesbitt	Chart
23	5	"Sorrow On the Rocks"	Porter Wagoner	RCA Victor
24	4	"Before I'm Over You"	Loretta Lynn	Columbia
25	5	"Five Little Fingers"	Bill Anderson	Decca
26 (tie)	7	"Love Is No Excuse"	Jim Reeves and Dottie West	RCA Victor
26 (tie)	5	"Long Gone Lonesome Blues"	Hank Williams, Jr.	M-G-M
28	10	"A Week in the Country"	Ernest Ashworth	Hickory
29	12	"Then I'll Stop Loving You"	The Browns	RCA Victor
30		"Circumstances"	Billy Walker	Columbia
31	4	"Don't Be Angry"	Stonewall Jackson	Columbia
32	5	"Your Heart Turned Left (And I Was on the Right)"	George Jones	United Artists
33	1	"Love's Gonna Live Here"	Buck Owens	Capitol
34	13	Timber I'm Falling	Ferlin Husky	Capitol
35	5	"Molly"	Eddy Arnold	RCA Victor
36	11	"Mr. and Mrs. Used to Be"	Ernest Tubb and Loretta Lynn	Decca
37	13	"Invisible Tears"	Ned Miller	Fabar
38	6	"Baltimore"	Sonny James	Capitol
39	7	"Please Talk to My Heart"	Ray Price	Columbia
40	3	"Chug-a-Lug"	Roger Miller	Smash
41	11	"Sam Hill"	Claude King	Columbia
42	8	"Peel Me a Nanner"	Roy Drusky	Mercury
43	1	"Once a Day"	Connie Smith	RCA Victor
44	3	"The Race Is On"	George Jones	United Artists
45	4	"Miller's Cave"	Bobby Bare	RCA Victor
46 (tie)	9	"D.J. for a Day"	Jimmy C. Newman	Decca
46 (tie)	12	"You Are My Flower"	Flatt & Scruggs	Columbia
48 (tie)	10	"Where Does a Little Tear Come From"	George Jones	United Artists
48 (tie)	14	"Easy Come – Easy Go"	Bill Anderson	Decca
50	10	"Here Comes My Baby"	Dottie West	RCA Victor

== See also ==
- List of Hot Country Singles number ones of 1964
- List of Billboard Hot 100 number ones of 1964
- 1964 in country music
