= 1964 in country music =

This is a list of notable events in country music that took place in 1964.

== Events ==
- January 11 — Billboard increases the length of its Hot Country Singles chart to 50 positions, up from 30 and publishes the first Top Country Albums chart.
- February 1 — Buck Owens' mega-hit, "Love's Gonna Live Here", finishes its 16-week run at No. 1 on the Billboard Hot Country Singles chart. Until 2012, it would be the most recent song to spend 10 or more weeks atop the chart.
- July 31 — A private aircraft piloted by Jim Reeves crashes during a thunderstorm near Nashville, Tennessee. Both Reeves and business partner Dean Manuel are killed in the crash; their bodies are found two days later following a massive search for the two missing men. Reeves, already a huge country star, would leave behind hundreds of unreleased recordings; many of those songs became huge posthumous hits during the next decade. Reeves' death comes just 16 months after the airplane crash deaths of Patsy Cline, Hawkshaw Hawkins and Cowboy Copas, leaving a huge void among country music fans.
- November 28 — "Once a Day," by Connie Smith, begins an eight-week stay at No. 1 on the Billboard Hot Country Singles chart. Until 2012, it is the longest-running No. 1 song by a solo female act, and will make the 23-year-old Smith — a native of Elkhart, Indiana — an overnight sensation.

== Top hits of the year ==
=== Number-one hits ===
==== United States ====
(as certified by Billboard)

Date	Single Name	Artist	Wks. No.1	CAN peak	Spec. Note
February 8	Begging to You	Marty Robbins	2	—	^{[2]}: Returns to Number One February 22.
February 15	B.J. the D.J.	Stonewall Jackson	1	—	^{[B]}: Jackson's first Billboard Number One since "Waterloo" in 1959.
March 7	Saginaw, Michigan	Lefty Frizzell	4	—	Frizzell's first Billboard Number One since "Give Me More, More, More (Of Your Kisses)" in 1952.
April 4	Understand Your Man	Johnny Cash	6	—
May 16	My Heart Skips a Beat	Buck Owens	7	—	^{[1], [2]}: Returns to Number One June 20.
June 6	Together Again	Buck Owens	2	—
July 18	Dang Me	Roger Miller	6	3	^{[A]}: The first of several songs by Miller that would also reach the Top 10 on the Billboard Pop Chart.
August 29	I Guess I'm Crazy	Jim Reeves	7		The first of six posthumous Number One hits for Reeves.
October 17	I Don't Care (Just as Long as You Love Me)	Buck Owens	6
November 28	Once a Day	Connie Smith	8	—	^{[C]}: Became the longest-running Billboard Number One song by a female country artist.; With this song, Smith became the first female country artist to top the charts with a debut single.

Notes

- 1 No. 1 song of the year, as determined by Billboard.
- 2 Song dropped from No. 1 and later returned to top spot.
- A First Billboard No. 1 hit for that artist.
- B Last Billboard No. 1 hit for that artist.
- C Only Billboard No. 1 hit for that artist to date.

==== Canada ====
(as certified by RPM)

Date	Single Name	Artist	Wks. No.1	U.S. peak	Spec. Note
September 14	I Guess I'm Crazy	Jim Reeves	1		^{[A]}
September 28	I Don't Love You Anymore	Charlie Louvin	1	4	^{[C]}
October 5	I Don't Care (Just as Long as You Love Me)	Buck Owens	2		^{[2], [A]}: Returned to Number One on October 26.
October 12	Please Talk to My Heart	Ray Price	2	7	^{[2], [A]}: Returned to Number One on November 2.
November 9	Give Me Forty Acres (To Turn This Rig Around)	Willis Brothers	1	9	^{[C]}
November 30	The Lumberjack	Hal Willis	1	5	^{[A]}
December 21	Don't Come Crying	Ron McLeod	3	—	^{[C]}

Notes

- 2 Song dropped from No. 1 and later returned to top spot.
- A First RPM No. 1 hit for that artist.
- C Only RPM No. 1 hit for that artist.

=== Other major hits ===
==== Singles released by American artists ====
US	CAN	Single	Artist
19	—	Ask Marie	Sonny James
8	5	Bad News	Johnny Cash
3	2	The Ballad of Ira Hayes	Johnny Cash
6	—	Baltimore	Sonny James
4	—	Before I'm Over You	Loretta Lynn
2	—	Burning Memories	Ray Price
17	—	Chickashay	David Houston
14	—	Chit Akins, Make Me a Star	Don Bowman
3	3	Chug-a-Lug	Roger Miller
7	—	Circumstances	Billy Walker
3	3	The Cowboy in the Continental Suit	Marty Robbins
2	5	Cross the Brazos at Waco	Billy Walker
9	—	D.J. for a Day	Jimmy C. Newman
13	4	Dern Ya	Ruby Wright
4	3	Don't Be Angry	Stonewall Jackson
14	—	Easy Come – Easy Go	Bill Anderson
9	2	Finally	Kitty Wells and Webb Pierce
5	—	Five Little Fingers	Bill Anderson
5	—	500 Miles Away from Home	Bobby Bare
15	—	Followed Closely by My Teardrops	Hank Locklin
9	3	Fort Worth, Dallas or Houston	George Hamilton IV
15	—	Girl from Spanish Town	Marty Robbins
8	—	Go Cat Go	Norma Jean
8	—	Gonna Get Along Without You Now	Skeeter Davis
17	—	He Says the Same Things to Me	Skeeter Davis
19	—	Helpless	Joe Carson
10	—	Here Comes My Baby	Dottie West
19	—	Howdy Neighbor Howdy	Porter Wagoner
4	—	I Love to Dance with Annie	Ernest Ashworth
11	—	I'll Go Down Swinging	Porter Wagoner
14	—	I'm Hanging Up the Phone	Carl Butler and Pearl
13	—	If the Back Door Could Talk	Webb Pierce
13	—	Invisible Tears	Ned Miller
12	—	Jealous Hearted Me	Eddy Arnold
16	—	Keep Those Cards and Letters Coming In	Johnny & Jonie Mosby
5	—	Keeping Up with the Joneses	Faron Young and Margie Singleton
7	—	Last Day in the Mines	Dave Dudley
11	—	Let's Go All the Way	Norma Jean
14	—	Lonely Girl	Carl Smith
5	—	Long Gone Lonesome Blues	Hank Williams, Jr.
7	—	Looking for More in '64	Jim Nesbitt
7	—	Love Is No Excuse	Jim Reeves and Dottie West
17	—	Love Looks Good on You	David Houston
6	—	Mad	Dave Dudley
8	—	Me	Bill Anderson
2	—	Memory #1	Webb Pierce
4	—	Miller's Cave	Bobby Bare
5	—	Molly	Eddy Arnold
20	—	Mother-in-Law	Jim Nesbitt
11	4	Mr. and Mrs. Used to Be	Ernest Tubb and Loretta Lynn
11	—	My Friend on the Right	Faron Young
15	—	My Tears Are Overdue	George Jones
11	—	Old Records	Margie Singleton
11	—	One If for Him, Two If for Me	David Houston
8	—	One of These Days	Marty Robbins
4	—	Password	Kitty Wells
8	—	Peel Me a Nanner	Roy Drusky
14	—	Petticoat Junction	Flatt & Scruggs
13	—	Pick of the Week	Roy Drusky
17	—	Pillow That Whispers	Carl Smith
3	—	The Race Is On	George Jones
11	2	Sam Hill	Claude King
5	—	Second Fiddle (To an Old Guitar)	Jean Shepard
19	—	Sing a Sad Song	Merle Haggard
5	—	Sorrow On the Rocks	Porter Wagoner
15	—	Take My Ring Off Your Finger	Carl Smith
12	—	Then I'll Stop Loving You	The Browns
7	—	This White Circle On My Finger	Kitty Wells
13	—	Timber I'm Falling	Ferlin Husky
9	—	Too Late to Try Again	Carl Butler and Pearl
16	—	Triangle	Carl Smith
12	—	Trouble in My Arms	Johnny & Jonie Mosby
10	—	A Week in the Country	Ernest Ashworth
2	—	Welcome to My World	Jim Reeves
10	—	Where Does a Little Tear Come From	George Jones
19	—	Widow Maker	Jimmy Martin
3	—	Wine, Women and Song	Loretta Lynn
12	—	You Are My Flower	Flatt & Scruggs
10	—	You'll Drive Me Back (Into Her Arms Again)	Faron Young
5	—	Your Heart Turned Left (And I Was on the Right)	George Jones

==== Singles released by Canadian artists ====
US	CAN	Single	Artist
—	4	Biggest Hurt of All	Dianne Leigh
11	—	Breakfast with the Blues	Hank Snow
—	5	Crazy Arms	Lucille Starr
—	5	Deer Island	Henchmen
—	8	My Good Life	Cy Anders
—	9	Night on the Water	Sandy Selsie

== Top new album releases ==
Album	Artist	Record Label
500 Miles Away from Home	Bobby Bare	RCA Victor
The Best of Buck Owens	Buck Owens	Capitol
Bill Anderson Sings	Bill Anderson	Decca
Bitter Tears: Ballads of the American Indian	Johnny Cash	Columbia
Eddy's Songs	Eddy Arnold	RCA
Grand Ole Opry Favorites	The Browns	RCA
Guitar Country	Chet Atkins	RCA
Hank Locklin Sings Hank Williams	Hank Locklin	RCA
I Don't Care	Buck Owens	Capitol
Irish Songs, Country Style	Hank Locklin	RCA
Let's Go All the Way	Norma Jean	RCA
Lighthearted and Blue	Jean Shepard	Capitol
Johnny Bond's Best	Johnny Bond	Harmony
Oh Pretty Woman	Roy Orbison	Columbia
Orange Blossom Special	Johnny Cash	Columbia
Pop Hits from the Country Side	Eddy Arnold	RCA
Progressive Pickin'	Chet Atkins	RCA
The Return of Roger Miller	Roger Miller	Smash
Sometimes I'm Happy, Sometimes I'm Blue	Eddy Arnold	RCA
This Young Land	The Browns	RCA
Together Again/My Heart Skips a Beat	Buck Owens	Capitol

== Births ==
- January 30 — Patricia Conroy, Canadian country star of the 1990s.
- April 11 — Steve Azar, singer-songwriter known his 2002 single "I Don't Have to Be Me ('til Monday)".
- May 28 — Jimmy Rankin, member of the country pop group The Rankin Family, who began a solo career in the 2000s (decade).
- May 28 — Phil Vassar, singer-songwriter of the late 1990s and 2000s (decade).
- May 30 — Wynonna Judd, daughter half of The Judds, who became a solo star in her own right during the 1990s.
- August 6 — Peggy and Patsy Lynn of The Lynns, twin daughters of Loretta Lynn and recording artists of the 1990s.
- September 19 — Trisha Yearwood, female vocalist active since the early 1990s, known for her close association with Garth Brooks.
- October 31 — Darryl Worley, singer-songwriter since the 2000s (decade), known for patriotic-themed songs ("Have You Forgotten?" and others)

== Deaths ==
- February 28 – Joe Carson, 27, auto accident
- June 9 – Alton Delmore, 55, one half of the old-time harmony duo Delmore Brothers.
- July 31 — Jim Reeves, 40, velvet-voiced singer and leading force in the Nashville Sound; many of his hits came posthumously. (plane crash)

== Country Music Hall of Fame Inductees ==
- Tex Ritter (1905–1974)

== Major awards ==
=== Grammy Awards ===
- Best Country and Western Vocal Performance, Female — "Here Comes My Baby", Dottie West
- Best Country and Western Vocal Performance, Male — "Dang Me", Roger Miller
- Best Country and Western Single — "Dang Me", Roger Miller
- Best Country and Western Song — "Dang Me", Roger Miller (Performer: Roger Miller)
- Best Country and Western Album — Dang Me/Chug-a-Lug, Roger Miller
- Best New Country and Western Artist — Roger Miller

== Other links ==
- Country Music Association
- Inductees of the Country Music Hall of Fame
