= 1965 in country music =

This is a list of notable events in country music that took place in 1965.

== Events ==
- January — Leo Fender, founder of Fender Guitars, sells his company to a subsidiary of Columbia Records for $13 million.
- February 17 — "The Tennessee Waltz" is declared the state song of Tennessee.
- October — Country Music Association president Tex Ritter awards Leo Fender the President's Award for "outstanding contributions to the sound of country music."

=== No dates ===
- The Vietnam War, which by now was making daily headlines, brings about the second wave of patriotic-themed songs. One of the first big songs was Johnnie Wright's "Hello Vietnam," a No. 1 hit in October. Late in the year, Dave Dudley records and releases "What We're Fighting For," an early response to the growing number of anti-Vietnam War protests. The trend continues through the rest of the 1960s and early 1970s, with songs such as "Distant Drums" by Jim Reeves; "The Ballad of the Green Berets" by Staff Sgt. Barry Sadler; "Dear Uncle Sam" by Loretta Lynn; and others. By the late 1960s, the tone of the songs became darker, most notably the Mel Tillis-penned "Ruby, Don't Take Your Love To Town" (first a hit for Johnny Darrell, but more famously in 1969 by Kenny Rogers and the First Edition).
- Country singer Merle Haggard marries fellow country singer and former wife of Buck Owens, Bonnie Owens, they will stay married until their divorce in 1978 but go on to be great friends and Owens will continue to tour with Haggard until her death in 2006.
- Dolly Parton signs her first national recording contract with Monument Records. Initially pitched to the teen market as a bubblegum pop singer, she makes her first Billboard magazine chart appearance, peaking at No. 8 on the Bubbling Under Hot 100 chart in October with a cover of The Tune Weavers' "Happy, Happy Birthday Baby." A second single, "Busy Signal", is released in December but does not reach any of the Billboard charts. Also during the year, she writes "Put It Off Until Tomorrow", recording both a solo version and backing Bill Phillips on his own version, the latter which became a hit in 1966 and would lead to her being allowed to change her style from pop to country (a reverse of what would happen a decade later, after she had become a superstar).
- Ernest Tubb debuts his new weekly TV show, which airs in syndication through 1969, mainly in southern U.S. markets. The show features his backing band the Texas Troubadours, and regular vocalists Jack Greene and Cal Smith.

== Top hits of the year ==
=== Number one hits ===
==== United States ====
(as certified by Billboard)

Date	Single Name	Artist	Wks. No.1	Spec. Note
January 23	You're the Only World I Know	Sonny James	4	Sonny's first Number One since "Young Love" in 1957.
February 20	I've Got a Tiger By the Tail	Buck Owens	5
March 27	King of the Road	Roger Miller	5	Also reached Number Four on the Billboard Hot 100 charts and Number One on the Hot Adult Contemporary Tracks charts and in the United Kingdom.
May 1	This Is It	Jim Reeves	3	^{[2]}: Returns to Number One May 29.
May 15	Girl on the Billboard	Del Reeves	2
June 5	What's He Doing in My World	Eddy Arnold	2	^{[1]}
June 19	Ribbon of Darkness	Marty Robbins	1	Written by Gordon Lightfoot.
June 26	Before You Go	Buck Owens	6
August 7	The First Thing Ev'ry Morning (And the Last Thing Ev'ry Night)	Jimmy Dean	2	^{[B]}
August 21	Yes, Mr. Peters	Roy Drusky with Priscilla Mitchell	2	^{[C]}
September 4	The Bridge Washed Out	Warner Mack	1	^{[B]}
September 11	Is It Really Over?	Jim Reeves	3
October 2	Only You (Can Break My Heart)	Buck Owens	1
October 9	Behind the Tear	Sonny James	3	^{[2]}: Returns to Number One November 13.
October 23	Hello Vietnam	Johnnie Wright	3	^{[C]}: Originally half member of the duo Johnnie & Jack, Wright went solo following Jack's death in 1963. This song marked a feat Wright could not do with Jack, reach Number One.; This was one of the first country music songs to discuss the conflicts about the Vietnam War.
November 20	May the Bird of Paradise Fly Up Your Nose	Little Jimmy Dickens	2	^{[C]}
December 4	Make the World Go Away	Eddy Arnold	3
December 25	Buckaroo	Buck Owens and the Buckaroos	2	^{[A] – The Buckaroos}

Notes

- 1 No. 1 song of the year, as determined by Billboard.
- 2 Song dropped from No. 1 and later returned to top spot.
- A First Billboard No. 1 hit for that artist.
- B Last Billboard No. 1 hit for that artist.
- C Only Billboard No. 1 hit for that artist to date.

==== Canada ====
(as certified by RPM)

Date	Single Name	Artist	Wks. No.1	Spec. Note
January 18	Hitch Hikin’	Dick Damron	2	^{[A]}
February 1	Bitty Baby	Howard Sisters	3	^{[C]}
February 22	Afraid	Donn Reynolds	2	^{[C]}
March 8	Texas Leather and Mexican Lace	Bob King	8	^{[C]}
April 26	I Wish That I Could Fall	Sandy Selsie	3	^{[2], [C]}: Returned to Number One on June 14.
May 10	Klondike Mike	Hal Willis	3	^{[B]}
June 7	Skip, Hop and Wobble	Artie McLearen	1	^{[C]}
June 21	Can't Live with Him	Myrna Lorrie	1	^{[A]}
June 28	Picking Up My Hat	Debbie Lori Kaye	9	^{[C]}
August 30	Cathy Keep Playing	Stu Phillips	3	^{[C]}
September 20	My Good Life	Cy Anders	3	^{[C]}
October 18	Break the News to Liza	Gary Buck	2	^{[A]}
November 1	My Tennessee Baby	Danny Harrison	3	^{[C]}
November 22	Marjolaina	Jimmy James	6	^{[C]}

Notes

- 2 Song dropped from No. 1 and later returned to top spot.
- A First RPM No. 1 hit for that artist.
- B Last RPM No. 1 hit for that artist.
- C Only RPM No. 1 hit for that artist.

=== Other major hits ===
==== Singles released by American artists ====
US	Single	Artist
19	Again	Don Gibson
8	Artificial Rose	Jimmy C. Newman
13	Back in Circulation	Jimmy C. Newman
18	Because I Cared	Ernest Ashworth
4	The Belles of Southern Bell	Del Reeves
7	Blue Kentucky Girl	Loretta Lynn
11	Bright Lights and Country Music	Bill Anderson
12	Certain	Bill Anderson
17	Close All the Honky Tonks	Charlie Walker
16	Country Guitar	Phil Baugh
12	Crystal Chandelier	Carl Belew
8	The DJ Cried	Ernest Ashworth
11	A Dear John Letter	Skeeter Davis and Bobby Bare
15	Do-Wacka-Do	Roger Miller
7	Do What You Do Do Well	Ned Miller
2	Engine Engine Number 9	Roger Miller
3	Four Strong Winds	Bobby Bare
6	All My Friends Are Gonna Be Strangers	Roy Drusky
10	Gonna Have Love	Buck Owens
4	Green, Green Grass of Home	Porter Wagoner
3	Happy Birthday	Loretta Lynn
9	Hicktown	Tennessee Ernie Ford
10	The Home You're Tearing Down	Loretta Lynn
9	I Can't Remember	Connie Smith
8	I Thank My Lucky Stars	Eddy Arnold
8	I Washed My Hands In Muddy Water	Stonewall Jackson
3	I Won't Forget You	Jim Reeves
8	I Wouldn't Buy a Used Car from Him	Norma Jean
2	I'll Keep Holding On (Just to Your Love)	Sonny James
8	I'll Repossess My Heart	Kitty Wells
19	I'm Gonna Tie One On Tonight	The Wilburn Brothers
15	I'm Letting You Go	Eddy Arnold
16	I've Got Five Dollars and It's Saturday Night	George Jones and Gene Pitney
4	If I Talk to Him	Connie Smith
16	If It Pleases You	Billy Walker
4	It Ain't Me Babe	Johnny Cash and June Carter
7	It's Alright	Bobby Bare
5	It's Another World	The Wilburn Brothers
7	Kansas City Star	Roger Miller
15	Least of All	George Jones
3	Livin' in a House Full of Love	David Houston
6	Love Bug	George Jones
8	Matamoros	Billy Walker
9	Meanwhile, Down at Joe's	Kitty Wells
15	Mister Garfield	Johnny Cash
10	(My Friends Are Gonna Be) Strangers	Merle Haggard
8	More Than Yesterday	Slim Whitman
19	My Old Faded Rose	Johnny Sea
3	Ode to the Little Brown Shack Out Back	Billy Edd Wheeler
10	One Dyin' and a Buryin'	Roger Miller
3	Orange Blossom Special	Johnny Cash
2	The Other Woman (In My Life)	Ray Price
15	Pass the Booze	Ernest Tubb
11	Pushed in a Corner	Ernest Ashworth
5	Queen of the House	Jody Miller
7	See the Big Man Cry	Charlie Louvin
12	She's Gone Gone Gone	Lefty Frizzell
4	Sittin' in an All Nite Cafe	Warner Mack
12	Six Times a Day (The Trains Come Down)	Dick Curless
10	The Sons of Katie Elder	Johnny Cash
16	Stop the World (And Let Me Off)	Waylon Jennings
18	Sweet, Sweet Judy	David Houston
2	10 Little Bottles	Johnny Bond
20	That Ain't All	John D. Loudermilk
4	Then and Only Then	Connie Smith
9	Things Have Gone to Pieces	George Jones
8	Three A.M.	Bill Anderson
15	A Tiger in My Tank	Jim Nesbitt
6	Tiger Woman	Claude King
5	A Tombstone Every Mile	Dick Curless
3	Truck Drivin' Son-of-a-Gun	Dave Dudley
11	Truck Drivin' Man	George Hamilton IV
15	Two Six Packs Away	Dave Dudley
10	Walk Tall	Faron Young
18	Walking the Floor Over You	George Hamilton IV
10	Watch Where You're Going	Don Gibson
13	Who Do You Think I Am	Webb Pierce
8	Wild as a Wildcat	Charlie Walker
14	Wine	Mel Tillis
14	Wrong Number	George Jones
4	Yakety Axe	Chet Atkins
4	You Don't Hear	Kitty Wells

==== Singles released by Canadian artists ====
US	CAN	Single	Artist
—	5	Backstreets of Life	Gary Buck
—	10	Badger Bodine	Lennie Siebert
—	6	Big Treaty	Scotty Stevenson
—	2	Born to Love	Danny Coughlin
—	5	Bottoms Up	Jimmy James
—	6	Bring on My Love	Mac Wiseman
—	2	Cadillacin' Around	Angus Walker
—	2	Come on in Mr. Heartache	Lennie Siebert
—	6	Country Corn	Jimmy Doyle
—	2	Do You Wish You Were Free	Myrna Lorrie
—	10	Don't Lead Me On	Ray Griff
—	2	Everybody's Looking at My	Jimmy James
—	4	Freckles, Freckles	Skip Evans
—	3	Girl with the Sad Lonely Look	Bob King
—	2	Golden Rocket	Dick Nolan
—	2	Golden Years	Ray Griff
—	10	Heartache No. 5	Sharon Strong
—	3	I'll Count Every Hour	Pat Hervey
—	2	I'm Not Sayin'	Gordon Lightfoot
—	9	If Loving You Did This	Ruthie McLean
—	3	Isle of Newfoundland	Bert Cuff
—	6	Just Look Behind You	Gary Buck
—	4	Little Tot	Art Young
—	2	Lookin' Back to See	The Canadian Sweethearts
—	4	Lorelei	Donn Reynolds
—	3	The Man	Lorne Greene
—	7	Nickel Piece of Candy	Wimmen
—	6	Nighthawk	Gary Buck
—	7	Nopper the Topper	Hal Willis
—	4	Saddle Shootin' Buddy	Johnny Rocker
—	10	Seven Days a Week	Bert Cuff
—	2	She Taught Me How to Yodel	Donn Reynolds
—	4	Sittin' and Thinkin'	Jerry Hatton
—	6	Spring Rains	Rita Curtis
—	5	Stand Upon the Mountain	The Canadian Sweethearts
—	4	A Taste of Love	Doug Hutton
—	7	That's the Way It Happens	Sandy Selsie
—	6	This Old Heart	Dusty King
—	8	Twisting the Pick	Roy Penney
—	6	Victim of Love	Jimmy James
—	2	What Will Tomorrow Bring	Danny Coughlin
—	6	Weeping Willow Tree	Ray Griff
7	—	The Wishing Well (Down in the Well)	Hank Snow
—	6	Wrapped Around Your Finger	MacKay Brothers

== Top new album releases ==
Album	Artist	Record Label
Before You Go	Buck Owens	Capitol
Behind the Tear	Sonny James	Capitol
Blues in My Heart	Wanda Jackson	Capitol
Breakin' in Another Heart	Hank Thompson	Capitol
Bright Lights and Country Music	Bill Anderson	Decca
Chet Atkins Picks on The Beatles	Chet Atkins	RCA
Connie Smith	Connie Smith	RCA
Country Willie: His Own Songs	Willie Nelson	RCA
Cute 'n' Country	Connie Smith	RCA
Doodle oo Doo Doo	Del Reeves	United Artists
The Easy Way	Eddy Arnold	RCA
From This Pen	Bill Anderson	Decca
Girl on The Billboard	Del Reeves	United Artists
Golden Hits	Roger Miller	Smash
Here Comes My Baby	Dottie West	RCA
Hot Rod Lincoln	Johnny Bond	Starday
I Heard the Bluebirds Sing	The Browns	RCA
I Want to Live and Love	Carl Smith	Columbia
It's a Man Every Time	Jean Shepard	Capitol
The Race Is On	George Jones	United Artists

=== Other Album Releases ===
Album	Artist	Record Label
Hank Locklin Sings Eddy Arnold	Hank Locklin	RCA
I'll Keep Holding On	Sonny James	Capitol
I've Got a Tiger By the Tail	Buck Owens	Capitol
The Instrumental Hits of Buck Owens and His Buckaroos	Buck Owens and the Buckaroos	Capitol
Kisses Don't Lie	Carl Smith	Columbia
Luckiest Heartache in Town	Hank Thompson	Capitol
Many Happy Hangovers	Jean Shepard	Capitol
My Favorite Guitars	Chet Atkins	RCA
My Kind of Country Music	Hank Locklin	RCA
My World	Eddy Arnold	RCA
New Country Hits	George Jones	Musicor
Once Over Lightly	Hank Locklin	RCA Victor
Pretty Miss Norma Jean	Norma Jean	RCA
Queen of the House	Jody Miller	Capitol
Sings Jim Reeves	Del Reeves	United Artists
Skeeter Sings Standards	Skeeter Davis	RCA
Ten Little Bottles	Johnny Bond	Starday
The Thin Man from West Plains	Porter Wagoner	RCA
Three Shades of Brown	The Browns	RCA
When Love is Gone	The Browns	RCA
You're the Only World I Know	Sonny James	Capitol
Your Favorite Country Hits	Hank Snow	RCA

== Births ==
- January 20 — John Michael Montgomery, honky tonk-styled singer of the 1990s and 2000s (decade); younger brother of Eddie Montgomery (of Montgomery Gentry).
- May 13 — Lari White, country singer of the 1990s (died 2018).
- July 16 — Craig Morgan, singer-songwriter since the 2000s (decade).
- August 7 — Raul Malo, lead singer of the alternative country band The Mavericks.
- August 28 — Shania Twain, mega country star since the latter half of the 1990s.

== Deaths ==
- June 20 — Ira Louvin, 41, tenor half of 2001 Country Music Hall of Fame inductees The Louvin Brothers.

== Country Music Hall of Fame Inductees ==
- Ernest Tubb (1914–1984)

== Major awards ==
=== Grammy Awards ===
- Best Country and Western Vocal Performance, Female — "Queen of the House", Jody Miller
- Best Country and Western Vocal Performance, Male — "King of the Road", Roger Miller
- Best Country and Western Single — "King of the Road", Roger Miller
- Best Country and Western Album — The Return of Roger Miller, Roger Miller
- Best Country and Western Artist — The Statler Brothers

=== Academy of Country Music ===
- Top Male Vocalist — Buck Owens
- Top Female Vocalist — Bonnie Owens
- Top Vocal Duo — Merle Haggard and Bonnie Owens
- Top New Male Vocalist — Merle Haggard
- Top New Female Vocalist — Kay Adams

== Other links ==
- Country Music Association
- Inductees of the Country Music Hall of Fame
