= List of Hot Country Singles number ones of 1964 =

Chart-topping country music songs of 1964

Lefty Frizzell had achieved a string of top 10 singles in the early 1950s but had experienced only sporadic success since then. In 1964 "Saginaw, Michigan" became his final number one.

Hot Country Songs is a chart that ranks the top-performing country music songs in the United States, published by Billboard magazine. In 1964, 11 different singles topped the chart, published at the time under the title Hot Country Singles, in 52 issues of the magazine. Chart placings were based on playlists submitted by country music radio stations and sales reports submitted by stores.

In the issue of Billboard dated January 4, the number one position was held by "Love's Gonna Live Here" by Buck Owens, the song's twelfth week in the top spot; the song would remain at number one through the issue dated February 1 for a total run of sixteen consecutive weeks in the top spot. This set a new record for the longest unbroken run at number one on the Hot Country chart which would stand until 2013 when Florida Georgia Line spent a seventeenth consecutive week atop the chart with "Cruise". Owens had three further number ones in 1964, "My Heart Skips a Beat", "Together Again" and "I Don't Care (Just as Long as You Love Me)" and spent a total of twenty weeks at number one during the year, more than twice as many as any other artist. He was the only artist to take more than one single to number one in 1964 and twice replaced himself in the top spot when "My Heart Skips a Beat" was displaced from the top of the chart by "Together Again" before regaining the peak position two weeks later.

Two acts had the first Hot Country number ones of their respective careers in 1964. Roger Miller spent six weeks atop the listing in July and August with his first chart-topper, the humorous song "Dang Me", and Connie Smith went to number one for the first time in November with "Once a Day", which remained in the top spot until the end of the year. Smith's song eventually spent eight consecutive weeks at number one, a record for a female singer which stood until 2012 when Taylor Swift's "We Are Never Ever Getting Back Together" remained atop the chart for nine weeks. In March 1964 Lefty Frizzell, one of country music's most influential vocalists, gained his final number one with "Saginaw, Michigan". One of the biggest country stars of the early 1950s, his career had been in decline for a number of years and he had not reached the top ten since 1959, but in 1964 he returned to number one for four weeks with "Saginaw, Michigan". Frizzell could not repeat this single's success, however; he would never again reach the top ten and alcoholism led to his death in 1975. In August 1964 "I Guess I'm Crazy" gave Jim Reeves the first of six number ones which he achieved posthumously; the singer had been killed in a plane crash the previous month.

== Chart history ==
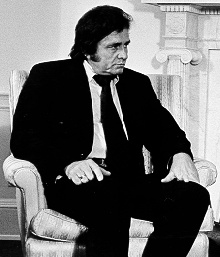
Johnny Cash had a six-week run at number one with "Understand Your Man".

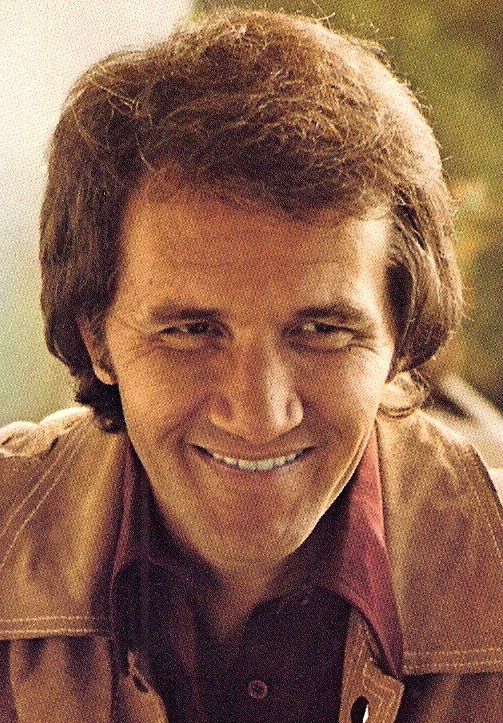
Roger Miller had his first chart-topper with "Dang Me".

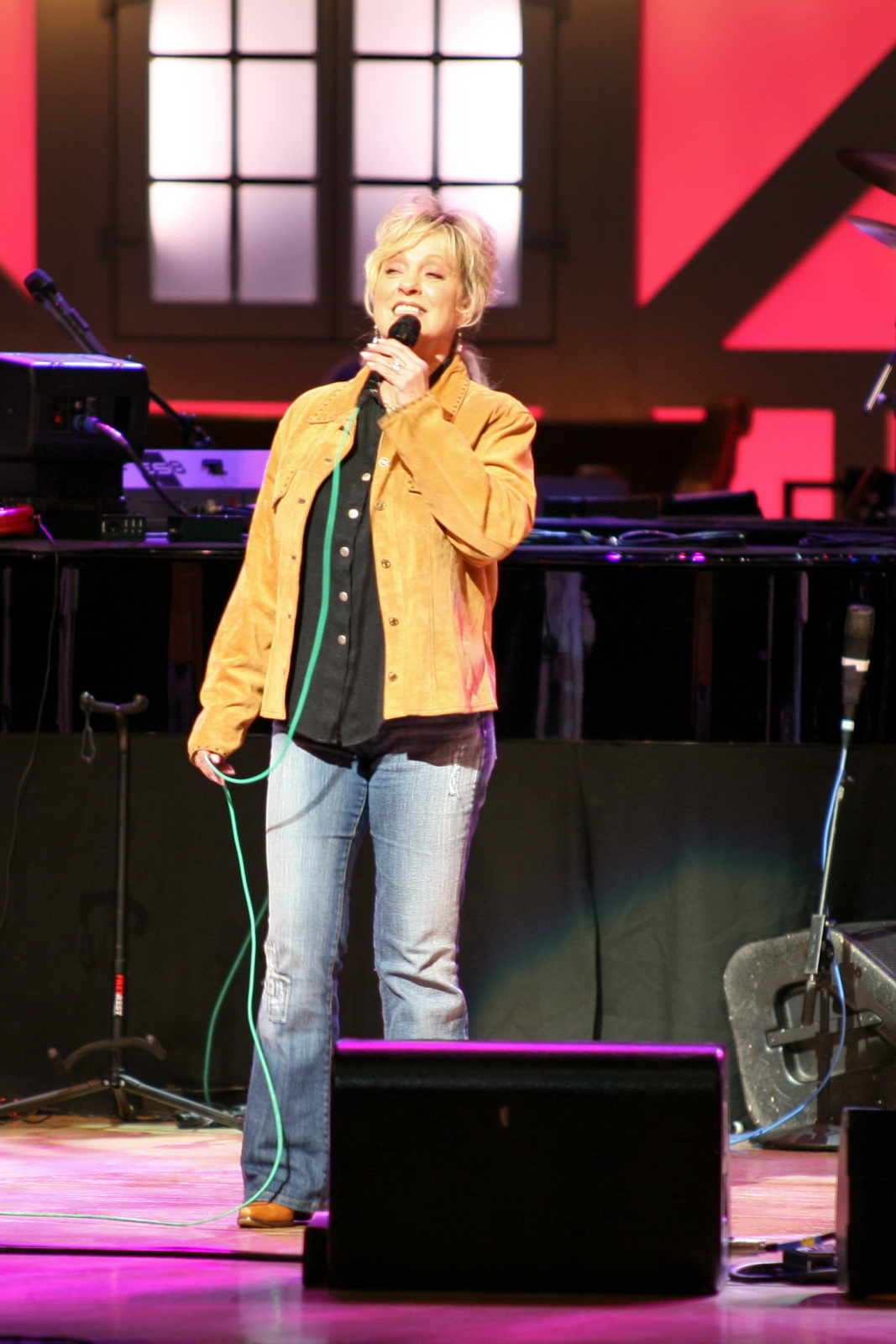
Connie Smith ended the year at number one with "Once a Day".

Hot Country Singles number ones of 1965
Issue date	Title	Artist(s)	Ref.
January 4	"Love's Gonna Live Here"	Buck Owens	
January 11	"Love's Gonna Live Here"	Buck Owens	
January 18	"Love's Gonna Live Here"	Buck Owens	
January 25	"Love's Gonna Live Here"	Buck Owens	
February 1	"Love's Gonna Live Here"	Buck Owens	
February 8	"Begging to You"	Marty Robbins	
February 15	"B.J. the D.J."	Stonewall Jackson	
February 22	"Begging to You"	Marty Robbins	
February 29	"Begging to You"	Marty Robbins	
March 7	"Saginaw, Michigan"	Lefty Frizzell	
March 14	"Saginaw, Michigan"	Lefty Frizzell	
March 21	"Saginaw, Michigan"	Lefty Frizzell	
March 28	"Saginaw, Michigan"	Lefty Frizzell	
April 4	"Understand Your Man"	Johnny Cash	
April 11	"Understand Your Man"	Johnny Cash	
April 18	"Understand Your Man"	Johnny Cash	
April 25	"Understand Your Man"	Johnny Cash	
May 2	"Understand Your Man"	Johnny Cash	
May 9	"Understand Your Man"	Johnny Cash	
May 16	"My Heart Skips a Beat"	Buck Owens	
May 23	"My Heart Skips a Beat"	Buck Owens	
May 30	"My Heart Skips a Beat"	Buck Owens	
June 6	"Together Again"	Buck Owens	
June 13	"Together Again"	Buck Owens	
June 20	"My Heart Skips a Beat"	Buck Owens	
June 27	"My Heart Skips a Beat"	Buck Owens	
July 4	"My Heart Skips a Beat"	Buck Owens	
July 11	"My Heart Skips a Beat"	Buck Owens	
July 18	"Dang Me"	Roger Miller	
July 25	"Dang Me"	Roger Miller	
August 1	"Dang Me"	Roger Miller	
August 8	"Dang Me"	Roger Miller	
August 15	"Dang Me"	Roger Miller	
August 22	"Dang Me"	Roger Miller	
August 29	"I Guess I'm Crazy"	Jim Reeves	
September 5	"I Guess I'm Crazy"	Jim Reeves	
September 12	"I Guess I'm Crazy"	Jim Reeves	
September 19	"I Guess I'm Crazy"	Jim Reeves	
September 26	"I Guess I'm Crazy"	Jim Reeves	
October 3	"I Guess I'm Crazy"	Jim Reeves	
October 10	"I Guess I'm Crazy"	Jim Reeves	
October 17	"I Don't Care (Just as Long as You Love Me)"	Buck Owens	
October 24	"I Don't Care (Just as Long as You Love Me)"	Buck Owens	
October 31	"I Don't Care (Just as Long as You Love Me)"	Buck Owens	
November 7	"I Don't Care (Just as Long as You Love Me)"	Buck Owens	
November 14	"I Don't Care (Just as Long as You Love Me)"	Buck Owens	
November 21	"I Don't Care (Just as Long as You Love Me)"	Buck Owens	
November 28	"Once a Day"	Connie Smith	
December 5	"Once a Day"	Connie Smith	
December 12	"Once a Day"	Connie Smith	
December 19	"Once a Day"	Connie Smith	
December 26	"Once a Day"	Connie Smith	

== See also ==
- 1964 in music
- 1964 in country music
- List of artists who reached number one on the U.S. country chart
