= List of RPM number-one country singles of 1964 =

These are the Canadian number-one country songs of 1964, per the RPM Country Tracks chart.

| Issue date | Title | Artist |
|---|---|---|
| September 14 | I Guess I'm Crazy | Jim Reeves |
| September 28 | I Don't Love You Anymore | Charlie Louvin |
| October 5 | I Don't Care (Just as Long as You Love Me) | Buck Owens |
| October 12 | Please Talk to My Heart | Ray Price |
| October 26 | I Don't Care (Just as Long as You Love Me) | Buck Owens |
| November 2 | Please Talk to My Heart | Ray Price |
| November 9 | Give Me Forty Acres (To Turn This Rig Around) | Willis Brothers |
| November 30 | The Lumberjack | Hal Willis |
| December 21 | Don't Come Crying | Ron McLeod |
| December 28 | Don't Come Crying | Ron McLeod |

== See also ==
- 1964 in Canadian music
