= List of Hot Country Albums number ones of 1965 =

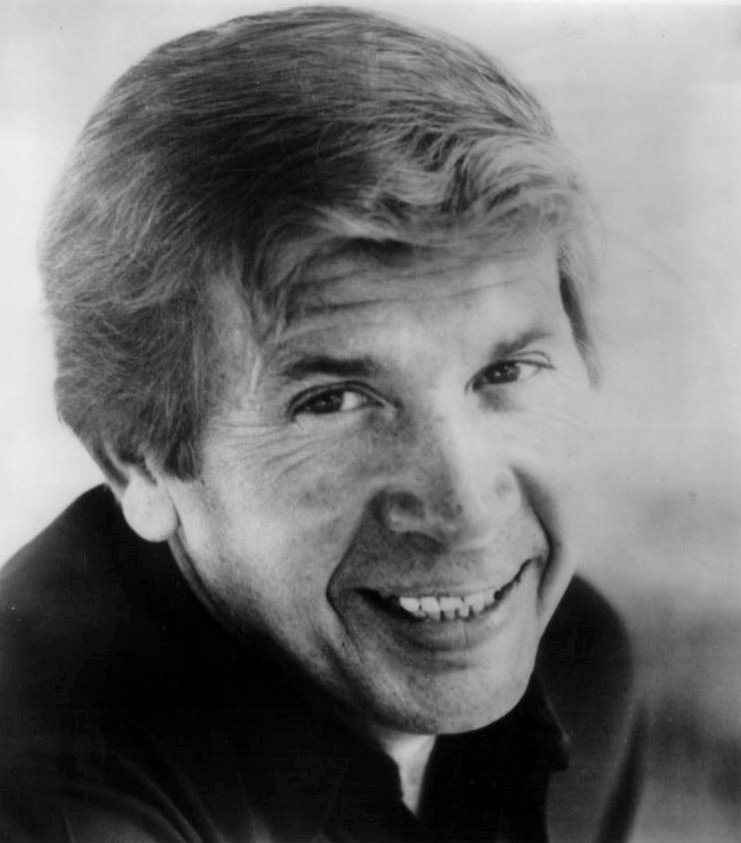
Buck Owens held the top spot on the country albums chart from the start of the year until July without interruption.

Top Country Albums is a chart that ranks the top-performing country music albums in the United States, published by Billboard. In 1965, 11 different albums topped the chart, which was at the time published under the title Hot Country Albums, based on sales reports submitted by a representative sample of stores nationwide.

In the issue of Billboard dated January 2, Buck Owens and his backing band the Buckaroos were at number one with Together Again/My Heart Skips a Beat, the album's seventh week in the top spot. The following week it was displaced by another album by Owens, I Don't Care, which went on to spend 13 consecutive weeks atop the chart, before being in turn replaced by I've Got a Tiger By the Tail, also by Owens. This album also spent 13 weeks at number one, meaning that Owens occupied the top spot without interruption from the start of the year until early July. I've Got a Tiger by the Tail returned to number one for two further weeks in September and Owens went on to spend one week atop the chart in October with his fourth number-one album of the year, Before You Go, giving him a total of 30 weeks spent at number one in 1965. Owens was one of the biggest stars in country music in the mid-1960s, achieving a run of 15 consecutive number ones on the Hot Country Singles chart between 1963 and 1967.

The album which finally ended Owens' run at number one was the self-titled debut album by Connie Smith. It was the first album by a female artist to top the country albums chart, approximately 18 months after it had first been published. The album spent a total of seven weeks atop the chart in two separate runs, and Smith returned to number one in the issue of Billboard dated December 25 with Cute 'n' Country, which was the year's final number-one album. She was one of two artists other than Buck Owens to achieve two number ones in 1965. In the same year she set a record for the longest run by a female artist at number one on the Hot Country Singles chart which would stand for nearly 50 years. Eddy Arnold also took two albums to the top of the chart in 1965. He had been one of the biggest country music stars of the late 1940s and early 1950s before his career went into a decline. He revived his fortunes in the mid-1960s by embracing the "Nashville sound", a newer style of country music which eschewed elements of the earlier honky-tonk style in favour of smooth productions which had a broader appeal, and went on to achieve a second run of success. In October, Jim Reeves reached number one with Up Through the Years; this was a posthumous chart-topper for the singer, who had died in an airplane crash the previous July.

== Chart history ==
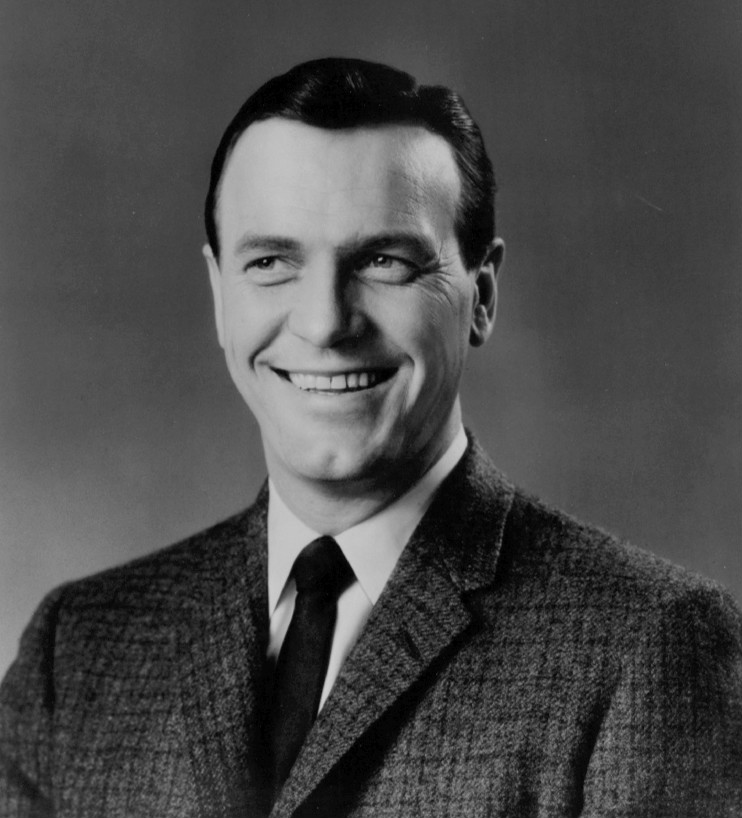
Eddy Arnold had two chart-topping albums in 1965.

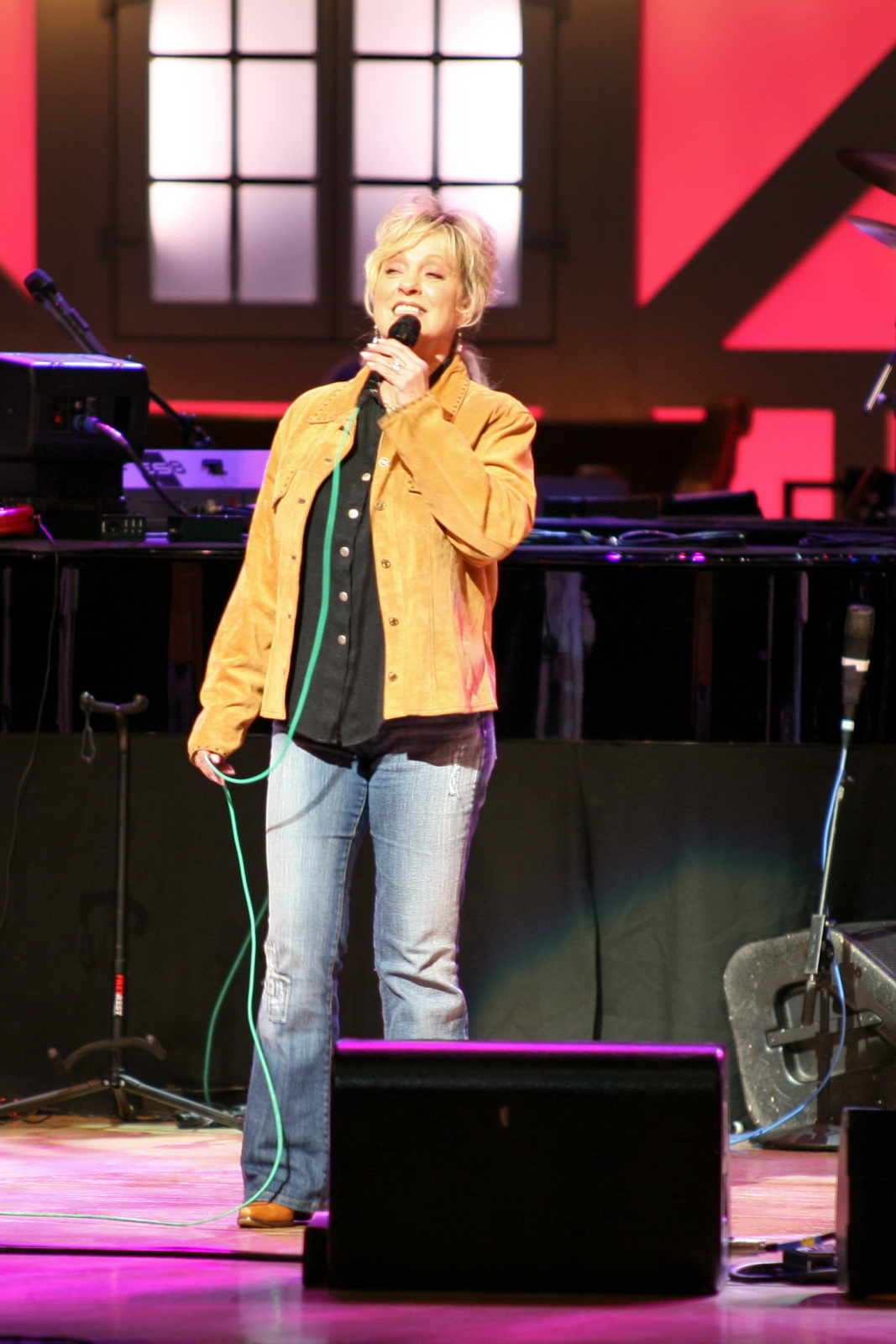
Connie Smith was the first female artist to top the country albums chart.

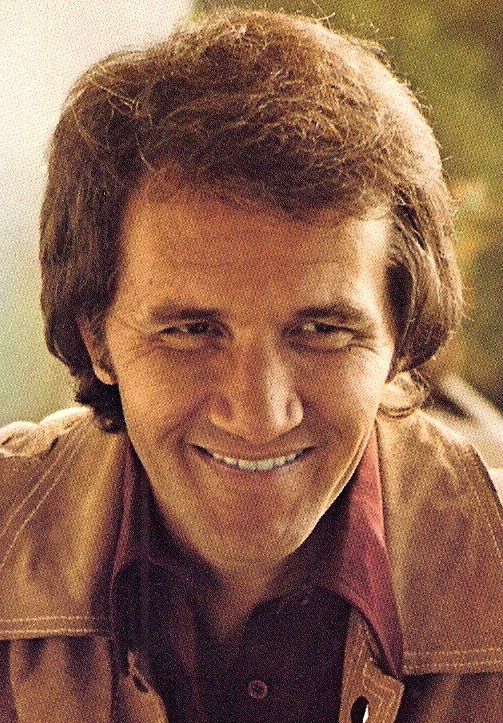
Roger Miller reached number one with The 3rd Time Around.

Issue date	Title	Artist(s)	Ref.
January 2	Together Again/My Heart Skips a Beat	Buck Owens and his Buckaroos	
January 9	I Don't Care	Buck Owens and his Buckaroos	
January 16	I Don't Care	Buck Owens and his Buckaroos	
January 23	I Don't Care	Buck Owens and his Buckaroos	
January 30	I Don't Care	Buck Owens and his Buckaroos	
February 6	I Don't Care	Buck Owens and his Buckaroos	
February 13	I Don't Care	Buck Owens and his Buckaroos	
February 20	I Don't Care	Buck Owens and his Buckaroos	
February 27	I Don't Care	Buck Owens and his Buckaroos	
March 6	I Don't Care	Buck Owens and his Buckaroos	
March 13	I Don't Care	Buck Owens and his Buckaroos	
March 20	I Don't Care	Buck Owens and his Buckaroos	
March 27	I Don't Care	Buck Owens and his Buckaroos	
April 3	I Don't Care	Buck Owens and his Buckaroos	
April 10	I've Got a Tiger by the Tail	Buck Owens and his Buckaroos	
April 17	I've Got a Tiger by the Tail	Buck Owens and his Buckaroos	
April 24	I've Got a Tiger by the Tail	Buck Owens and his Buckaroos	
May 1	I've Got a Tiger by the Tail	Buck Owens and his Buckaroos	
May 8	I've Got a Tiger by the Tail	Buck Owens and his Buckaroos	
May 15	I've Got a Tiger by the Tail	Buck Owens and his Buckaroos	
May 22	I've Got a Tiger by the Tail	Buck Owens and his Buckaroos	
May 29	I've Got a Tiger by the Tail	Buck Owens and his Buckaroos	
June 5	I've Got a Tiger by the Tail	Buck Owens and his Buckaroos	
June 12	I've Got a Tiger by the Tail	Buck Owens and his Buckaroos	
June 19	I've Got a Tiger by the Tail	Buck Owens and his Buckaroos	
June 26	I've Got a Tiger by the Tail	Buck Owens and his Buckaroos	
July 3	I've Got a Tiger by the Tail	Buck Owens and his Buckaroos	
July 10	Connie Smith	Connie Smith	
July 17	Connie Smith	Connie Smith	
July 24	Connie Smith	Connie Smith	
July 31	Connie Smith	Connie Smith	
August 7	Connie Smith	Connie Smith	
August 14	The Easy Way	Eddy Arnold	
August 21	The Easy Way	Eddy Arnold	
August 28	Connie Smith	Connie Smith	
September 4	Connie Smith	Connie Smith	
September 11	I've Got a Tiger by the Tail	Buck Owens and his Buckaroos	
September 18	I've Got a Tiger by the Tail	Buck Owens and his Buckaroos	
September 25	The 3rd Time Around	Roger Miller	
October 2	The 3rd Time Around	Roger Miller	
October 9	Before You Go	Buck Owens and his Buckaroos	
October 16	Up Through the Years	Jim Reeves	
October 23	Up Through the Years	Jim Reeves	
October 30	My World	Eddy Arnold	
November 6	My World	Eddy Arnold	
November 13	The First Thing Ev'ry Morning	Jimmy Dean	
November 20	The First Thing Ev'ry Morning	Jimmy Dean	
November 27	My World	Eddy Arnold	
December 4	My World	Eddy Arnold	
December 11	My World	Eddy Arnold	
December 18	My World	Eddy Arnold	
December 25	Cute 'n' Country	Connie Smith	
