= List of Billboard Year-End number-one singles and albums =

The Billboard Year-End chart is a chart published by Billboard which denotes the top song of each year as determined by the publication's charts. Since 1946, Year-End charts have existed for the top songs in pop, R&B, and country, with additional album charts for each genre debuting in 1956, 1966, and 1965, respectively.

Year	Pop		R&B/Soul/Hip-Hop		Country	
Year	Single	Album	Single	Album	Single	Album
1946	"Prisoner of Love"; Perry Como	—	"Hey! Ba-Ba-Re-Bop"; Lionel Hampton	—	"New Spanish Two Step"; Bob Wills	—
1947	"Near You"; Francis Craig	—	"Ain't Nobody Here But Us Chickens"; Louis Jordan	—	"Smoke! Smoke! Smoke! (That Cigarette)"; Tex Williams Western Caravan	—
1948	"Twelfth Street Rag"; Pee Wee Hunt	—	"Long Gone"; Sonny Thompson	—	"Bouquet of Roses"; Eddy Arnold	—
1949	"Riders in the Sky"; Vaughn Monroe Orchestra	—	"The Hucklebuck"; Paul Williams	—	"Lovesick Blues"; Hank Williams and the Drifting Cowboys	—
1950	"Goodnight, Irene"; Gordon Jenkins and The Weavers	—	"Pink Champagne"; Joe Liggins	—	"I'm Movin' On"; Hank Snow	—
1951	"Too Young"; Nat King Cole	—	"Sixty Minute Man"; The Dominoes	—	"Cold, Cold Heart"; Hank Williams	—
1952	"Blue Tango"; Leroy Anderson	—	"Lawdy Miss Clawdy"; Lloyd Price	—	"Wild Side of Life"; Hank Thompson	—
1953	"Song from Moulin Rouge"; Percy Faith	—	"(Mama) He Treats Your Daughter Mean"; Ruth Brown	—	"Kaw-Liga"; Hank Williams	—
1954	"Little Things Mean a Lot"; Kitty Kallen	—	"Work with Me, Annie"; Midnighters	—	"I Don't Hurt Anymore"; Hank Snow	—
1955	"Cherry Pink and Apple Blossom White"; Perez Prado	—	"Pledging My Love"; Johnny Ace	—	"In the Jailhouse Now"; Webb Pierce	—
1956	"Heartbreak Hotel"; Elvis Presley	Calypso; Harry Belafonte	"Honky Tonk"; Bill Doggett	—	"Crazy Arms"; Ray Price	—
1957	"All Shook Up"; Elvis Presley	My Fair Lady; Original Cast	"Jailhouse Rock"/"Treat Me Nice"; Elvis Presley	—	"Gone"; Ferlin Husky	—
1958	"Nel Blu Dipinto di Blu (Volare)"; Domenico Modugno	My Fair Lady; Original Cast	"What Am I Loving For"/"Hang Up My Rock & Roll Shoes"; Chuck Willis	—	"Oh Lonesome Me"/"I Can't Stop Loving You"; Don Gibson	—
1959	"The Battle of New Orleans"; Johnny Horton	Music from Peter Gunn; Henry Mancini	"Stagger Lee"; Lloyd Price	—	"The Battle of New Orleans"; Johnny Horton	—
1960	Theme from "A Summer Place"; Percy Faith	The Sound of Music; Original Cast	"Kiddio"; Brook Benton	—	"Please Help Me, I'm Falling"; Hank Locklin	—
1961	"Tossin' and Turnin'"; Bobby Lewis	Camelot; Original Cast	"Tossin' and Turnin'"; Bobby Lewis	—	"I Fall to Pieces"; Patsy Cline	—
1962	"Stranger on the Shore"; Mr. Acker Bilk	West Side Story; Soundtrack	"Soul Twist"; King Curtis	—	"Wolverton Mountain"; Claude King	—
1963	"Sugar Shack"; Jimmy Gilmer and the Fireballs "Surfin' U.S.A."; The Beach Boys	West Side Story; Soundtrack	"Part Time Love"; Little Johnny Taylor	—	"Still"; Bill Anderson	—
1964	"I Want to Hold Your Hand"; The Beatles	Hello, Dolly! Original Cast	—	—	"My Heart Skips a Beat"; Buck Owens	—
1965	"Wooly Bully"; Sam the Sham & the Pharaohs	Mary Poppins; Soundtrack	"I Can't Help Myself (Sugar Pie Honey Bunch)"; Four Tops	—	"What's He Doing in My World"; Eddy Arnold	I've Got a Tiger By the Tail; Buck Owens
1966	"The Ballad of the Green Berets"; SSgt. Barry Sadler "California Dreamin'"; The Mamas and the Papas	Whipped Cream & Other Delights; Herb Alpert & the Tijuana Brass	"Hold On! I'm Comin'"; Sam & Dave	Lou Rawls Live! Lou Rawls	"Almost Persuaded"; David Houston	My World; Eddy Arnold
1967	"To Sir with Love"; Lulu	More of The Monkees; The Monkees	"Respect"; Aretha Franklin	Greatest Hits; The Temptations	"All the Time"; Jack Greene	There Goes My Everything; Jack Greene
1968	"Hey Jude"; The Beatles	Are You Experienced; The Jimi Hendrix Experience	"Say It Loud – I'm Black and I'm Proud"; James Brown	Lady Soul; Aretha Franklin	"Folsom Prison Blues"; Johnny Cash	By the Time I Get to Phoenix; Glen Campbell
1969	"Sugar, Sugar"; The Archies	In-A-Gadda-Da-Vida; Iron Butterfly	"What Does It Take (To Win Your Love)"; Jr. Walker and the All Stars	Cloud Nine; The Temptations	"My Life (Throw It Away If I Want To)"; Bill Anderson	Wichita Lineman; Glen Campbell
1970	"Bridge over Troubled Water"; Simon & Garfunkel	Bridge over Troubled Water; Simon & Garfunkel	"I'll Be There"; Jackson 5	The Isaac Hayes Movement; Isaac Hayes	"Hello Darlin'"; Conway Twitty	The Best of Charley Pride; Charley Pride
1971	"Joy to the World"; Three Dog Night	Jesus Christ Superstar; Soundtrack	"Mr. Big Stuff"; Jean Knight	...To Be Continued; Isaac Hayes	"Easy Loving"; Freddie Hart	Rose Garden; Lynn Anderson
1972	"The First Time Ever I Saw Your Face"; Roberta Flack	Harvest; Neil Young	"Let's Stay Together"; Al Green	Revolution of the Mind: Recorded Live at the Apollo, Vol. III; James Brown	"My Hang-Up Is You"; Freddie Hart	The Best of Charley Pride, Vol. 2 Charley Pride
1973	"Tie a Yellow Ribbon 'Round the Ole Oak Tree"; Tony Orlando and Dawn	The World Is a Ghetto; War	"Let's Get It On"; Marvin Gaye	I'm Still in Love with You; Al Green	"You've Never Been This Far Before"; Conway Twitty	Behind Closed Doors; Charlie Rich
1974	"The Way We Were"; Barbra Streisand	Goodbye Yellow Brick Road; Elton John	"Feel Like Makin' Love"; Roberta Flack	Ship Ahoy; O'Jays	"There Won't Be Anymore"; Charlie Rich	Behind Closed Doors; Charlie Rich
1975	"Love Will Keep Us Together"; Captain & Tennille	Elton John's Greatest Hits; Elton John	"Fight the Power Pt. 1"; Isley Brothers	That's the Way of the World; Earth, Wind & Fire	"Rhinestone Cowboy"; Glen Campbell	Back Home Again; John Denver
1976	"Silly Love Songs"; Wings	Frampton Comes Alive; Peter Frampton	"Disco Lady"; Johnnie Taylor	Rufus featuring Chaka Khan; Rufus featuring Chaka Khan	"Convoy"; C.W. McCall	The Sound in Your Mind; Willie Nelson
1977	"Tonight's the Night (Gonna Be Alright)"; Rod Stewart	Rumours; Fleetwood Mac	"Float On"; The Floaters	Songs in the Key of Life; Stevie Wonder	"Luckenbach, Texas (Back to the Basics of Love)"; Waylon Jennings	Ol' Waylon; Waylon Jennings
1978	"Shadow Dancing"; Andy Gibb	Saturday Night Fever; Soundtrack	"Serpentine Fire"; Earth, Wind & Fire	All 'N All; Earth, Wind & Fire	"Mamas Don't Let Your Babies Grow Up to Be Cowboys"/"I Can Get Off on You"; Waylon & Willie	Stardust; Willie Nelson
1979	"My Sharona"; The Knack	52nd Street; Billy Joel	"Good Times"; Chic	C'est Chic; Chic	"I Just Fall in Love Again"; Anne Murray	The Gambler; Kenny Rogers
1980	"Call Me"; Blondie	The Wall; Pink Floyd	"Let's Get Serious"; Jermaine Jackson	Off the Wall; Michael Jackson	"My Heart"/"Silent Night (After the Fight)"; Ronnie Milsap	Kenny; Kenny Rogers
1981	"Bette Davis Eyes"; Kim Carnes	Hi Infidelity; REO Speedwagon	"Endless Love"; Diana Ross and Lionel Richie	Street Songs; Rick James	"Fire and Smoke"; Earl Thomas Conley	9 to 5 and Odd Jobs; Dolly Parton
1982	"Physical"; Olivia Newton-John	Asia; Asia	"That Girl"; Stevie Wonder	Raise! Earth, Wind & Fire	"Always on My Mind"; Willie Nelson	Always on My Mind; Willie Nelson
1983	"Every Breath You Take"; The Police	Thriller; Michael Jackson	"Sexual Healing"; Marvin Gaye	Thriller; Michael Jackson	"José Cuervo"; Shelly West	Mountain Music; Alabama
1984	"When Doves Cry"; Prince	Thriller; Michael Jackson	"When Doves Cry"; Prince	Can't Slow Down; Lionel Richie	"To All the Girls I've Loved Before"; Julio Iglesias and Willie Nelson	Don't Cheat in Our Hometown; Ricky Skaggs
1985	"Careless Whisper"; Wham! featuring George Michael	Born in the U.S.A. Bruce Springsteen	"Rock Me Tonight (For Old Times Sake)"; Freddie Jackson	Emergency; Kool & the Gang	"Lost in the Fifties Tonight"; Ronnie Milsap	40-Hour Week; Alabama
1986	"That's What Friends Are For"; Dionne & Friends	Whitney Houston; Whitney Houston	"On My Own"; Patti LaBelle and Michael McDonald	Whitney Houston; Whitney Houston	"Never Be You"; Rosanne Cash	Rockin' with the Rhythm; The Judds
1987	"Walk Like an Egyptian"; The Bangles	Slippery When Wet; Bon Jovi	"Stop to Love"; Luther Vandross	Just Like the First Time; Freddie Jackson	"Give Me Wings"; Michael Johnson	Storms of Life; Randy Travis
1988	"Faith"; George Michael	Faith; George Michael	"I Want Her"; Keith Sweat	Make It Last Forever; Keith Sweat	"Don't Close Your Eyes"; Keith Whitley	Always & Forever; Randy Travis
1989	"Look Away"; Chicago	Don't Be Cruel; Bobby Brown	"Superwoman"; Karyn White	Guy; Guy	"A Better Man"; Clint Black	Loving Proof; Ricky Van Shelton
1990	"Hold On"; Wilson Phillips	Janet Jackson's Rhythm Nation 1814; Janet Jackson	"Hold On"; En Vogue	Janet Jackson's Rhythm Nation 1814; Janet Jackson	"Nobody's Home"; Clint Black	Killin' Time; Clint Black
1991	"(Everything I Do) I Do It for You"; Bryan Adams	Mariah Carey; Mariah Carey	"Written All Over Your Face"; Rude Boys	I'm Your Baby Tonight; Whitney Houston	"Don't Rock the Jukebox"; Alan Jackson	No Fences; Garth Brooks
1992	"End of the Road"; Boyz II Men	Ropin' the Wind; Garth Brooks	"Come and Talk to Me"; Jodeci	Forever My Lady; Jodeci	"I Saw the Light"; Wynonna	Ropin' the Wind; Garth Brooks
1993	"I Will Always Love You"; Whitney Houston	The Bodyguard; Soundtrack	"I Will Always Love You"; Whitney Houston	The Bodyguard; Soundtrack	"Chattahoochee"; Alan Jackson	Some Gave All; Billy Ray Cyrus
1994	"The Sign"; Ace of Base	The Sign; Ace of Base	"Bump n' Grind"; R. Kelly	Doggystyle; Snoop Doggy Dogg	"I Swear"; John Michael Montgomery	Not a Moment Too Soon; Tim McGraw
1995	"Gangsta's Paradise"; Coolio featuring L.V.	Cracked Rear View; Hootie & the Blowfish	"Creep"; TLC	My Life; Mary J. Blige	"Sold (The Grundy County Auction Incident)"; John Michael Montgomery	The Hits; Garth Brooks
1996	"Macarena" (Bayside Boys Mix); Los del Río	Jagged Little Pill; Alanis Morissette	"You're Makin' Me High"/"Let It Flow"; Toni Braxton	The Score; Fugees	"My Maria"; Brooks & Dunn	The Woman in Me; Shania Twain
1997	"Candle in the Wind 1997"/"Something About the Way You Look Tonight"; Elton John	Spice; Spice Girls	"In My Bed"; Dru Hill	Life After Death; The Notorious B.I.G.	"It's Your Love"; Tim McGraw and Faith Hill	Blue; LeAnn Rimes
1998	"Too Close"; Next	Titanic; Soundtrack	"Too Close"; Next	The Miseducation Of Lauryn Hill; Lauryn Hill	"Just to See You Smile"; Tim McGraw	Sevens; Garth Brooks
1999	"Believe"; Cher	Millennium; Backstreet Boys	"Fortunate"; Maxwell	400 Degreez; Juvenile	"Amazed"; Lonestar	Come On Over; Shania Twain
2000	"Breathe"; Faith Hill	No Strings Attached 'N Sync	"Let's Get Married"; Jagged Edge	2001; Dr. Dre	How Do You Like Me Now?! Toby Keith	Fly; Dixie Chicks
2001	"Hanging by a Moment"; Lifehouse	1 The Beatles	"Fiesta"; R. Kelly featuring Jay-Z	TP-2.Com; R. Kelly	"Ain't Nothing 'Bout You"; Brooks & Dunn	Greatest Hits; Tim McGraw
2002	"How You Remind Me"; Nickelback	The Eminem Show; Eminem	"Foolish"; Ashanti	The Eminem Show; Eminem	"The Good Stuff"; Kenny Chesney	O Brother, Where Are Thou? Soundtrack
2003	"In Da Club"; 50 Cent	Get Rich or Die Tryin'; 50 Cent	"In Da Club"; 50 Cent	Get Rich or Die Tryin'; 50 Cent	"My Front Porch Looking In"; Lonestar	Up! Shania Twain
2004	"Yeah!"; Usher featuring Lil Jon and Ludacris	Confessions; Usher	"If I Ain't Got You"; Alicia Keys	Confessions; Usher	"Live Like You Were Dying"; Tim McGraw	Shock'n Y'all; Toby Keith
2005	"We Belong Together"; Mariah Carey	The Massacre; 50 Cent	"Let Me Love You"; Mario	The Massacre; 50 Cent	"That's What I Love About Sunday"; Craig Morgan	Greatest Hits; Shania Twain
2006	"Bad Day"; Daniel Powter	Some Hearts; Carrie Underwood	"Be Without You"; Mary J. Blige	The Breakthrough; Mary J. Blige	"If You're Going Through Hell (Before the Devil Even Knows)"; Rodney Atkins	Some Hearts; Carrie Underwood
2007	"Irreplaceable"; Beyoncé	Daughtry; Daughtry	"Lost Without U"; Robin Thicke	Kingdom Come; Jay-Z	"Watching You"; Rodney Atkins	Some Hearts; Carrie Underwood
2008	"Low"; Flo Rida featuring T-Pain	As I Am; Alicia Keys	"Like You'll Never See Me Again"; Alicia Keys	As I Am; Alicia Keys	"Just Got Started Lovin' You"; James Otto	Long Road out of Eden; Eagles
2009	"Boom Boom Pow"; The Black Eyed Peas	Fearless; Taylor Swift	"Blame It"; Jamie Foxx featuring T-Pain	I Am... Sasha Fierce; Beyoncé	"I Run to You"; Lady Antebellum	Fearless; Taylor Swift
2010	"Tik Tok"; Kesha	I Dreamed a Dream; Susan Boyle	"Un-Thinkable (I'm Ready)"; Alicia Keys	Recovery; Eminem	"Love Like Crazy"; Lee Brice	Need You Now; Lady Antebellum
2011	"Rolling in the Deep"; Adele	21; Adele	"Sure Thing"; Miguel	Tha Carter IV; Lil Wayne	"Crazy Girl"; Eli Young Band	Speak Now; Taylor Swift
2012	"Somebody That I Used to Know"; Gotye featuring Kimbra	21; Adele	"Love on Top"; Beyoncé	Take Care; Drake	"Time Is Love"; Josh Turner	Red; Taylor Swift
2013	"Thrift Shop"; Macklemore & Ryan Lewis featuring Wanz	The 20/20 Experience; Justin Timberlake	"Thrift Shop"; Macklemore and Ryan Lewis featuring Wanz	The 20/20 Experience; Justin Timberlake	"Cruise"; Florida Georgia Line	Red; Taylor Swift
2014	"Happy"; Pharrell Williams	Frozen; Soundtrack	"Happy"; Pharrell Williams	Beyoncé; Beyoncé	"This Is How We Roll"; Florida Georgia Line featuring Luke Bryan	Crash My Party; Luke Bryan
2015	"Uptown Funk"; Mark Ronson featuring Bruno Mars	1989; Taylor Swift	"See You Again"; Wiz Khalifa featuring Charlie Puth	If You're Reading This It's Too Late; Drake	"Take Your Time"; Sam Hunt	Montevallo; Sam Hunt
2016	"Love Yourself"; Justin Bieber	25; Adele	"One Dance"; Drake featuring Wizkid and Kyla	Views; Drake	"H.O.L.Y."; Florida Georgia Line	Traveller; Chris Stapleton
2017	"Shape of You"; Ed Sheeran	Damn; Kendrick Lamar	"That's What I Like"; Bruno Mars	Damn; Kendrick Lamar	"Body Like a Back Road"; Sam Hunt	Traveller; Chris Stapleton
2018	"God's Plan"; Drake	Reputation; Taylor Swift	"God's Plan"; Drake	Scorpion; Drake	"Meant to Be"; Bebe Rexha featuring Florida Georgia Line	This One's for You; Luke Combs
2019	"Old Town Road"; Lil Nas X featuring Billy Ray Cyrus	When We All Fall Asleep, Where Do We Go? Billie Eilish	"Old Town Road"; Lil Nas X featuring Billy Ray Cyrus	Beerbongs & Bentleys; Post Malone	"Whiskey Glasses"; Morgan Wallen	This One's for You; Luke Combs
2020	"Blinding Lights"; The Weeknd	Hollywood's Bleeding; Post Malone	"Blinding Lights"; The Weeknd	Hollywood's Bleeding; Post Malone	"I Hope"; Gabby Barrett	What You See Is What You Get; Luke Combs
2021	"Levitating"; Dua Lipa	Dangerous: The Double Album; Morgan Wallen	"Leave the Door Open"; Silk Sonic (Bruno Mars and Anderson .Paak)	Shoot for the Stars, Aim for the Moon; Pop Smoke	"Forever After All"; Luke Combs	Dangerous: The Double Album; Morgan Wallen
2022	"Heat Waves"; Glass Animals	Un Verano Sin Ti; Bad Bunny	"First Class"; Jack Harlow	Certified Lover Boy; Drake	"Wasted on You"; Morgan Wallen	Dangerous: The Double Album; Morgan Wallen
2023	"Last Night"; Morgan Wallen	One Thing at a Time; Morgan Wallen	"Kill Bill"; SZA	SOS; SZA	"Last Night"; Morgan Wallen	One Thing at a Time; Morgan Wallen
2024	"Lose Control"; Teddy Swims	The Tortured Poets Department; Taylor Swift	"Not Like Us"; Kendrick Lamar	For All the Dogs; Drake	"A Bar Song (Tipsy)"; Shaboozey	One Thing at a Time; Morgan Wallen
2025	"Die with a Smile"; Lady Gaga and Bruno Mars	The Life of a Showgirl; Taylor Swift	"Luther"; Kendrick Lamar and SZA	SOS; SZA	"A Bar Song (Tipsy)"; Shaboozey	I'm the Problem; Morgan Wallen

== See also ==
- List of best-selling albums by year in the United States
