= Luxury liner =

Luxury liner may refer to:

- Ocean liner
- Luxury Liner (album), a 1977 album by Emmylou Harris
- Luxury Liner (1933 film), a 1933 Paramount Pictures film
- Luxury Liner (1948 film), 1948 motion picture from MGM
- "Luxury Liner", a 1967 song by International Submarine Band
- McDonnell Douglas DC-10, an American trijet wide-body aircraft sometimes called the Luxury Liner
