= One of These Days (Emmylou Harris song) =

Single by Emmylou Harris

from the album Elite Hotel
- B-side: "'Til I Gain Control Again"
- Released: March 6, 1976
- Genre: Country
- Length: 3:07
- Label: Reprise
- Songwriter: Earl Montgomery
- Producer: Brian Ahern

Emmylou Harris singles chronology
"Together Again" (1976)	"One of These Days" (1976)	"Sweet Dreams" (1976)

"One of These Days" is a song written by Earl Montgomery, first recorded by George Jones in 1972, and most successfully released by American country music artist Emmylou Harris in March 1976 as the second single from the album Elite Hotel. The Emmylou Harris recording reached number 3 on the Billboard Hot Country Singles & Tracks chart.

== Charts ==
=== Weekly charts ===
Chart (1976)	Peak position
US Hot Country Songs (Billboard)	3
Canadian RPM Country Tracks	2

=== Year-end charts ===
Chart (1976)	Position
US Hot Country Songs (Billboard)	21

== Uses In Media ==
- "One of These Days" is used as background music in the fourth episode of the 2018 Hulu series Castle Rock.

== Other Versions ==
Tammy Wynette covered “One of These Days” in 1976, including her version on her album You and Me.
