= You're the Only World I Know =

Single by Sonny James

from the album You're the Only World I Know
- B-side: "Tying the Pieces Together"
- Released: November 1964 (U.S.)
- Recorded: 1964
- Genre: Country
- Length: 2:13
- Label: Capitol
- Songwriter(s): Sonny James and Robert Tubert

Sonny James singles chronology
"Sugar Lump" / "Ask Marie" (1964)	"You're the Only World I Know" (1964)	"I'll Keep Holding On (Just to Your Love)" (1965)

"You're the Only World I Know" is a song written by Sonny James and Robert Tubert and performed by Sonny James.

== Song popularity ==
In January 1965, "You're the Only World I Know was Sonny James' second No. 1 on the Billboard magazine Hot Country Singles chart (after "Young Love" in early 1957). The song had crossover popularity, reaching the Billboard Top 100 and Easy listening surveys. "You're the Only World I Know" also kicked off James' amazing run of popularity, which continued to the mid-'70s. From 1965 through 1974, James enjoyed 22 No. 1 songs, including a string of 16 straight.

== Chart performance ==
Chart (1964–1965)	Peak position
U.S. Billboard Hot Country Singles	1
U.S. Billboard Hot 100	91
U.S. Billboard Easy Listening chart	22

== Cover versions ==
In 1973, a cover of "You're the Only World I Know" appeared on Marie Osmond's debut album Paper Roses, which James produced.
