= Is It Really Over? =

Single by Jim Reeves

from the album Distant Drums
- B-side: "Rosa Rio"
- Released: June 1965
- Genre: Country
- Label: RCA
- Songwriter(s): Jim Reeves
- Producer(s): Chet Atkins

Jim Reeves singles chronology
"This Is It" (1965)	"Is It Really Over?" (1965)	"Snowflake" (1966)

"Is It Really Over" is a 1965 single by Jim Reeves. "Is It Really Over" was Reeves' third posthumous release to hit number one on the U.S. country singles chart. The single stayed at the top for three weeks and spent a total of nineteen weeks on the chart. "Is It Really Over" peaked at number seventy-nine on the Hot 100 and at number ten on the Easy Listening charts.

== Chart performance ==
Chart (1965)	Peak position
U.S. Billboard Hot Country Singles	1
U.S. Billboard Easy Listening Singles	10
U.S. Billboard Hot 100	79

== Awards and nominations ==
Award	Year (Note: Indicates the year of ceremony.)	Category	Result	Ref.
Grammy Awards	1966	Best Country & Western Vocal Performance – Male	Nominated	
