= Burning Memories (Ray Price album) =

Studio album by Ray Price
- Released: 1965
- Genre: Country
- Label: Columbia
- Producer: Don Law, Frank Jones

Ray Price chronology
Love Life (1964)	Burning Memories (1965)	Western Strings (1965)

Singles from Burning Memories
- 1. "Walk Me to the Door" Released: December 24, 1962; 2. "Make the World Go Away" Released: June 26, 1963; 3. "Burning Memories" Released: February 4, 1964; 4. "A Thing Called Sadness" Released: November 2, 1964

Burning Memories is a studio album by country music artist Ray Price. It was released in 1965 by Columbia Records (catalog no. CS-9089). The cover photograph was credited to Don Hunstein.

The album debuted on Billboard magazine's country album chart on March 20, 1965, peaked at No. 8, and remained on the chart for a total of nine weeks. The album included six Top 20 singles: "Burning Memories" (No. 2); "Make the World Go Away" (No. 2); "Soft Rain" (No. 3); "Release Me" (No. 6); "Walk Me to the Door" (No. 7); and "You Took Her Off My Hands (Now Please Take Her Off My Mind)" (No. 11).

AllMusic gave the album five stars. Critic Thom Jurek noted that the album marked Price's departure from traditional honky tonk style to a countrypolitan style with string section, such that "the only identifying country marker is the corny cowboy hat he's wearing on the cover." He nevertheless enthused "it's still a badass country record."

== Track listing ==
Side A

1. "Burning Memories" (Mel Tillis, Wayne Walker) - 2:29
2. "Here Comes My Baby Back Again" (Billy West, Dottie West) - 2:42
3. "Make the World Go Away" (Hank Cochran) - 2:32
4. "Are You Sure" (Buddy Emmons, Willie Nelson) - 2:21
5. "Soft Rain" (Ray Price) - 2:52
6. "Release Me" (Eddie Miller, Dub Williams, Robert Yount) - 2:41

Side B

1. "Together Again" (Buck Owens) - 2:17
2. "You Took Her Off My Hands (Now Please Take Her Off My Mind)" (Harlan Howard, Skeets McDonald, Wynn Stewart) - 3:06
3. "A Thing Called Sadness" (Chuck Howard) - 2:46
4. "Walk Me to the Door" (Conway Twitty) - 3:05
5. "That's All That Matters" (Hank Cochran) - 2:05
6. "Let Me Talk to You" (Donald D. Davis, Danny Dill) - 3:03
