= Werly Fairburn =

American singer-songwriter

Werly Fairburn (November 27, 1924 – January 18, 1985) was an American rockabilly musician.

Fairburn was born near Folsom, Louisiana. In his youth, he listened to the Grand Ole Opry and old-time music ("hillbilly music") on the radio. He learned to play guitar from an old, local blues musician. When World War II began, he took a job at a New Orleans shipyard before enlisting in the U.S. Navy in Hawaii. When he returned to New Orleans, he considered a singing career, but to make a living he learned how to cut hair. In 1948 he became known as the "Singing Barber" when he broadcast on WJBW from his barber shop.

In March 1955, Werly joined the cast of the Louisiana Hayride in Shreveport, where he performed alongside Elvis Presley, Johnny Cash, Bob Luman, David Houston and other early rockabilly stylists. Werly remained with the Hayride through the end of 1957. His first record appeared on Trumpet Records in the 1950s. Over the years he recorded for Columbia, Capitol, and Savoy. Fairburn also owned a label called Milestone Records—not to be confused with the like-named jazz label later founded by Orrin Keepnews—in the 1950s and 1960s. Fairburn's music blended country, blues, and New Orleans rhythm and blues (R&B). He was popular in New Orleans and in Dallas, where he performed on the Big D Jamboree. His song "I Guess I'm Crazy" was covered by Jim Reeves. Reeves recorded the song in 1964, and his version was released shortly before his death, becoming a posthumous hit. His 1956 single "Everybody's Rockin'" is considered a rockabilly classic. Fairburn moved to California in the 1960s and performed until he died in 1985.

== Discography ==
Year	Title	Label
1953	Camping with Marie / Let's Live It Over	Trumpet Records No. 195
1953	I Feel Like Cryin' / Baby, Call on Me	Trumpet Records No. 196
1954	Good Deal, Lucille / Baby He's a Wolf	Capitol Records #F2270
1954	Love Spelled Backwards Is Evol / Nothin' But Lovin	Capitol Records #F2844
1954	Prison Cell of Love / I Feel Like Cryin’	Capitol Records #F2963
1955	It's a Cold, Weary World / Spiteful Heart	Capitol Records #F3101
1955	I Guess I'm Crazy (For Loving You) / That Sweet Love of Mine	Columbia Records No. 21432
1956	Broken Hearted Me / Stay Close to Me	Columbia Records No. 21483
1956	Everybody's Rockin' / It's Heaven	Columbia Records No. 21528
1956	All the Time / I'm a Fool About Your Love	Savoy Records No. 1503
1957	My Heart's on Fire / Speak to Me Baby	Savoy Records No. 1509
1957	Telephone Baby / No Blues Tomorrow	Savoy Records No. 1521
1962	You Are My Sunshine / Doggone That Moon	Milestone Records No. 2013
1968	My Crazy World / There's Something On	Paula Records No. 295
	A Little Bit of Nothing; Won't It Be Nice	Capitol Records (not issued)
	I'm Jealous	Columbia Records (not issued)
	All By Myself (live); I've Got Nothing But Love; Old Memories Come Back	not issued

== Notes ==
All singles before Milestone 2013 were issued as 78 rpm and 45 rpm records with the same issue numbers. Milestone 2013 and on are 45 rpm only issues. UK record collector Matthew Duncan provided information for this article, having referred to Barry John's Rockabilly Price Guide for 45 rpm records and vintage recordings from his collection.
