= Together Again (Buck Owens album) =

Together Again/My Heart Skips a Beat

Studio album by Buck Owens
- Released: July 20, 1964
- Recorded: April 1962, January - June 1964
- Studio: Capitol (Hollywood)
- Genre: Country
- Label: Capitol ST-2135
- Producer: Ken Nelson

Buck Owens chronology
| The Best of Buck Owens (1964) | Together Again/My Heart Skips a Beat (1964) | I Don't Care (1964) |

Singles from Together Again
- 1. "My Heart Skips a Beat" Released: February 24, 1964; 2. "Together Again" Released: April 4, 1964

Together Again/My Heart Skips a Beat, or simply Together Again, is the first studio album (and Owens sixth overall) by American band Buck Owens and his Buckaroos, released on July 20, 1964 by Capitol Records. The double-sided single "Together Again"/"My Heart Skips a Beat" reached number one on the Billboard country chart.

== Reception ==
Professional ratings
Review scores
| Source | Rating |
|---|---|
| AllMusic | 4.5/5 stars |
| Record Mirror | 3/5 stars |

In his Allmusic review, critic Stephen Thomas Erlewine called the album "one of Buck Owens' strongest albums of the '60s, as well as one of his few records to stick firmly in the honky tonk camp."

== Track listing ==
=== Side one ===
1. "My Heart Skips a Beat" (Buck Owens)
2. "Close Up the Honky Tonks" (Red Simpson)
3. "I Don't Hear You" (Owens)
4. "Save the Last Dance for Me" (Doc Pomus, Mort Shuman)
5. "Over and Over Again" (Owens)
6. "Truck Drivin' Man" (Terry Fell)

=== Side two ===
1. "Together Again" (Owens)
2. "A-11" (Hank Cochran)
3. "Ain't it Amazing Gracie" (Owens, Glen Garrison)
4. "Getting Used to Losing You" (Owens, Don Rich)
5. "Storm of Love" (Harlan Howard, Owens)
6. "Hello Trouble (Come on In)" (Orville Couch, Eddie McDuff)

== Personnel ==
- Buck Owens – guitar, vocals
- Don Rich – guitar, fiddle, vocals
- Willie Cantu – drums
- Bob Morris – bass
- Jay McDonald – pedal steel guitar
- Doyle Holly – bass
- Ken Presley – drums
- Tom Brumley – pedal steel guitar

== Charts ==
Chart performance for Together Again / My Heart Skips a Beat
| Chart (1964–1965) | Peak position |
|---|---|
| US Billboard 200 | 88 |
| US Top Country Albums (Billboard) | 1 |
