= I Don't Care (album) =

Studio album by Buck Owens
- Released: November 2, 1964
- Recorded: July 1964
- Studio: Capitol (Hollywood)
- Genre: Country
- Label: Capitol ST-2186
- Producer: Ken Nelson

Buck Owens chronology
Together Again (1964)	I Don't Care (1964)	I've Got a Tiger by the Tail (1965)

Singles from I Don't Care
- 1. "I Don't Care (Just as Long as You Love Me)" Released: August 3, 1964

I Don't Care is the second studio album (and Owens seventh overall) by American band Buck Owens and his Buckaroos, released in 1964. It reached Number one on the Billboard Country charts and Number 135 on the Pop Albums charts. The single "I Don't Care" spent six weeks at number one.

The album features a duet with Rose Maddox as well as lead vocals by Don Rich and Doyle Holly. It was re-released on CD in 1995 by Sundazed Music with two bonus tracks, both instrumentals from The Buck Owens Songbook.

== Reception ==
Professional ratings
Review scores
Source	Rating
Allmusic	3/5 stars

In his Allmusic review, critic Cub Koda wrote "Like his previous albums, this one features solo performances from Owens... mixed with solo turns by the rest of the band."

== Track listing ==
=== Side one ===
1. "I Don't Care (Just as Long as You Love Me)" (Buck Owens) – 2:10
2. "Dang Me" (Roger Miller) – 2:01
3. "Don't Let Her Know" (Owens, Bonnie Owens, Don Rich) – 2:35
4. "Buck's Polka" (Owens) – 1:55
5. "Understand Your Man" (Johnny Cash) – 2:50
6. "Loose Talk" (Freddie Hart, Ann Lucas) – 2:34

=== Side two ===
1. "You're Welcome Anytime" (Buddy Mize, Ray Sanders) – 2:28
2. "Abilene" (John D. Loudermilk) – 2:48
3. "Playboy" (Eddie Miller, Bob Morris) – 1:56
4. "Bud's Bounce" (Bud Isaacs) – 1:48
5. "Louisiana Man" (Doug Kershaw) – 2:49
6. "This Ol' Heart" (Eddie Miller, Bob Morris) – 2:07

1995 bonus tracks:

1. "I Don't Care (Just as Long as You Love Me)" (Owens) – 2:09
2. "Don't Let Her Know" (Owens, Owens, Rich) – 2:38

== Personnel ==
- Buck Owens – guitar, vocals
- Don Rich – guitar, fiddle, vocals, (lead vocal on "Dang Me" and "Louisiana Man")
- Doyle Holly – bass, vocals (lead vocal on "Abilene" and "Understand Your Man")
- Rose Maddox – vocal duet on "Loose Talk"
- Tom Brumley – pedal steel guitar
- Willie Cantu – drums
- Pee Wee Adams – drums
- Bob Morris – bass
- Jay McDonald – pedal steel guitar
- Mel King – drums
- George French – piano
- Jim Pierce – piano
- Jelly Sanders – fiddle, guitar
- Allen Williams – bass

== Charts ==
Chart performance for I Don't Care
Chart (1964–1965)	Peak position
Norwegian Albums (VG-lista)	13
US Billboard 200	135
US Top Country Albums (Billboard)	1
