= Before You Go (Buck Owens song) =

Single by Buck Owens

from the album Before You Go
- B-side: "(I Want) No One but You"
- Released: April 19, 1965
- Genre: Country
- Label: Capitol
- Songwriter(s): Buck Owens; Don Rich
- Producer(s): Ken Nelson

Buck Owens singles chronology
| "I've Got a Tiger By the Tail" (1964) | "Before You Go" (1965) | "Only You (Can Break My Heart)" (1965) |

"Before You Go" is a 1965 title track of the album by Buck Owens. "Before You Go" was co-written by Owens, along with Don Rich. The single was Owens's seventh release to hit number one on the U.S. country singles chart where it spent six weeks at the top and total of twenty weeks on the chart.

== Chart performance ==
| Chart (1965) | Peak position |
|---|---|
| U.S. Billboard Hot Country Singles | 1 |
| U.S. Billboard Hot 100 | 83 |
