= Before You Go (Buck Owens album) =

Studio album by Buck Owens
- Released: July 26, 1965
- Recorded: March 1965
- Studio: Capitol (Hollywood)
- Genre: Country
- Label: Capitol ST-2353
- Producer: Ken Nelson

Buck Owens chronology
I've Got a Tiger by the Tail (1965)	Before You Go (1965)	Christmas with Buck Owens (1965)

Singles from Before You Go
- 1. "Before You Go" Released: April 19, 1965

Before You Go is the fourth studio album (and Owens ninth overall) by Buck Owens and his Buckaroos, released in 1965. It is no longer in print.

== Reception ==
Professional ratings
Review scores
Source	Rating
AllMusic	3/5 stars
Record Mirror	3/5 stars

In his AllMusic review, critic Richie Unterberger wrote: "This has the usual competent original material and accomplished guitar picking, paced by the number one title track, with occasional instrumentals thrown in for a change of pace."

== Track listing ==
=== Side one ===
1. "Before You Go" (Buck Owens, Don Rich) - 2:09
2. "Gonna Have Love" (Owens, Red Simpson) - 1:53
3. "Getting Used to Loving You" (Owens, Rich) - 2:20
4. "Steel Guitar Rag" (Leon McAuliffe, Cliff Stone, Merle Travis) - 1:47
5. "No Fool Like an Old Fool" (Owens) - 2:42
6. "I Betcha Didn't Know" (Lamar Morris) - 1:53

=== Side two ===
1. "(I Want) No One but You" (Owens, Simpson) - 1:59
2. "If You Want a Love" (Buck Owens, Bonnie Owens, Don Rich) - 2:41
3. "Number One Heel" (Owens, Owens) - 2:08
4. "Raz-Ma-Taz Polka" (Owens) - 2:23
5. "There's Gonna Come a Day" (Owens) - 2:13
6. "Charlie Brown" (Jerry Leiber, Mike Stoller) with Doyle Holly - 2:25

== Charts ==
Chart performance for Before You Go
Chart (1965)	Peak position
Norwegian Albums (VG-lista)	20
US Top Country Albums (Billboard)	1
