= Ron McLeod =

Australian rules footballer (1919–2003)

Personal information
- Full name: Ron McLeod
- Born: 4 January 1919
- Died: 9 October 2003 (aged 84)
- Height: 178 cm (5 ft 10 in)
- Weight: 72 kg (159 lb)
- Position: Wing / Forward

Playing career^{1}
Years	Club	Games (Goals)
1936–38	North Melbourne	28 (13)
1940–41, 1944, 1946–47	St Kilda	39 (35)
Total		67 (48)
- ^{1} Playing statistics correct to the end of 1947.

Ron McLeod (4 January 1919 – 9 October 2003) was an Australian rules footballer who played with North Melbourne and St Kilda in the Victorian Football League (VFL).
