= I've Got a Tiger By the Tail =

Single by Buck Owens and the Buckaroos

from the album I've Got a Tiger by the Tail
- B-side: "Cryin' Time"
- Released: December 28, 1964 (U.S.)
- Recorded: December 1, 1964; Hollywood, California
- Genre: Country
- Length: 2:13
- Label: Capitol 5336A
- Songwriters: Harlan Howard and Buck Owens
- Producer: Ken Nelson

Buck Owens and the Buckaroos singles chronology
"I Don't Care (Just as Long as You Love Me)" (1964)	"I've Got a Tiger By the Tail" (1964)	"Before You Go" (1965)

"I've Got a Tiger By the Tail" is a song made famous by country music band Buck Owens and the Buckaroos. Released in December 1964, the song was one of Owens' signature songs and showcases of the Bakersfield sound in the genre. In 1999, the song was inducted into the Grammy Hall of Fame.

In 1965, Dave Berry used "I've Got a Tiger By the Tail" as the B-side of his single "Little Things" and the single reached number 5 in the UK Singles Chart.

== About the song ==
Owens — in the liner notes to The Buck Owens Collection: 1959-1990 — recalled that he and songwriter Harlan Howard had gotten together to write songs, but things were going slowly. Then, Owens saw an Esso gas station sign with the company's slogan at the time, "Put a tiger in your tank" ... and got an idea.

Released in December 1964 (just weeks after he had recorded it), "I've Got a Tiger By the Tail" was Owens' and the Buckaroos sixth No. 1 hit on the Billboard magazine Hot Country Singles chart in February 1965. The song is Owens' and the Buckaroos biggest hit (and only top-40 hit) on the Billboard Hot 100, where it peaked at No. 25, although its five weeks atop the chart made it far from Owens' biggest hit on the country charts — several of his other No. 1 songs spent anywhere from six to 16 weeks at No. 1.

== Covers ==
Waylon Jennings covered the song and included it on his album Waylon Sings Ol'_Harlan which was released by RCA Records in 1967.

New Riders of the Purple Sage covered the song at live gigs during the early 70s. A rare recording can be found on Bear's Sonic Journals: Dawn of the New Riders of the Purple Sage (released 2020).

== Chart performance ==
Chart (1964–1965)	Peak position
U.S. Billboard Hot Country Singles	1
U.S. Billboard Hot 100	25
Canadian RPM Top Singles	12
