= This Is It (Jim Reeves song) =

Single by Jim Reeves

from the album Distant Drums
- B-side: "There's That Smile Again"
- Released: February 1965
- Genre: Country
- Label: RCA
- Songwriter(s): Cindy Walker
- Producer(s): Chet Atkins

Jim Reeves singles chronology
"I Won't Forget You" (1964)	"This Is It" (1965)	"Is It Really Over?" (1965)

"This Is It" is a 1965 single by Jim Reeves. "This Is It" was Reeves' second posthumous single to reach number one on the U.S. country singles chart. The single stayed at the top of the chart for three weeks and spent a total of twenty-two weeks on the chart. "This Is It" also peaked at number eighteen on the "Easy Listening" charts and number eighty-eight on the Billboard Hot 100.

== Chart performance ==
Chart (1965)	Peak position
U.S. Billboard Hot Country Singles	1
U.S. Billboard Easy Listening Singles	18
U.S. Billboard Hot 100	88
