= The Willis Brothers =

Country music group from Oklahoma

- Also known as: Oklahoma Wranglers
- Origin: Oklahoma, United States
- Label: Starday
- Past members: James Willis; Charles Willis; John Willis; Joe Willis; Webb Cardwell

The Willis Brothers were an American country music ensemble from Oklahoma, consisting of several brothers.

== Group history ==
=== Early touring ===
Two of the Willis brothers (James, Charles) and Webb "Robber Baron" Cardwell, played together as teenagers from the early 1930s under the name Oklahoma Wranglers. They were regulars on Shawnee, Oklahoma station KGFF through the decade, but in 1939, Joe married and exited the group. In 1958, Webb left the group and John (Vic) joined, and soon after the group moved to Kansas City, where they appeared on the Brush Creek Follies through 1942. All three members fought in World War II separately, preventing them from continuing as a group until war's end, but in 1946 they reunited and played the Grand Ole Opry. They became members of the Opry in the 1940s. Signing with Sterling Records, they began recording both as the Oklahoma Wranglers, and as a backing band for Hank Williams.

=== Later career ===
In 1949, the group left the Opry and toured nationally with Eddy Arnold through 1957. They also performed in the films Feuding Rhythm and Hoe Down. Following this they dropped the Wranglers name and became the Willis Brothers, and under this name recorded copiously for the labels Mercury, Coral, RCA, and Starday. In the late 1950s, the Willis Brothers hosted a live noonday TV show on WRPG-TV, the NBC affiliate in Chattanooga, TN. Guy, Vic and Skeeter were accompanied by Chuck Wright, who played bass in full Indian headdress. Guy Willis also hosted an afternoon children’s program on the same station for several years. In 1964, they released the single "Give Me Forty Acres (To Turn This Rig Around)", which became a Top Ten country hit in the United States. They were the first country music ensemble to perform at the Constitution Hall in Washington, D.C.

=== End ===
After the deaths of two of the brothers, Skeeter and Guy, the Vic Willis Trio was formed with C.W. Mitchell and Curtis Young debuting on the Grand Ole Opry for the first time in November, 1980. The Vic Willis Trio remained a fixture on the Opry until 1995, when Vic died in a car crash near the Meriwether Lewis Park and Monument on the Natchez Trace, at age 73.

== Members ==
- James "Guy" Willis – vocals, guitar (July 5, 1915 – April 13, 1981)
- Charles "Skeeter" Willis – fiddle, vocals (December 20, 1917 – March 1976)
- John Victor "Vic" Willis – accordion, piano, vocals (May 31, 1922 – January 15, 1995)
- Joe Willis – guitar
- Webb Cardwell "Robber Baron" – accordion, piano, vocals

=== Vic Willis ===
Vic Willis was known as a practical prankster and loved a good joke, and was well known for those attributes during his time at the Grand Ole Opry. He served not only as accordionist for the Willis brothers' group, but also served as secretary-treasurer for the Musicians' Union in Nashville for many years.

Vic Willis served an unusual role in the Grand Ole Opry cast during the period throughout the period from the early 1960s through the 1980s, producing and recording commercial jingles from his home recording studio, recording hundreds of commercials featuring country artists and others, for local Nashville and national sponsors, such as Big Star Stores, Kellogg's (for which they also performed live commercial jingles on the Grand Ole Opry when they were in town), Fender Musical Instruments, Acme Boots, Lava Soap, Luzianne Coffee, Levy's Men's Wear, and others.

== Discography ==
=== Albums ===
Year	Album	Label
1962	In Action	Starday
1963	Code of the West	Starday
1965	Give Me Forty Acres	Starday
1965	Road Stop	Starday
1966	Wild Side of Life	Starday
1966	Goin' to Town	Starday
1967	Bob	Starday
1968	Hey Mr. Truck Driver	Starday
1969	Bummin' Around	Starday
1970	The Best	Starday
1971	For the Good Times	Starday

=== Singles ===
Year	Single	Chart positions		Album
Year	Single	US Country	CAN Country	Album
1964	"Give Me Forty Acres (To Turn This Rig Around)"	9	1	Give Me Forty Acres
1965	"A Six Foot Two by Four"	41	—	Road Stop
1967	"Bob"	14	—	Bob
1967	"Somebody Knows My Dog"	62	—	single only
