= I've Got a Tiger By the Tail (album) =

I've Got a Tiger by the Tail

Studio album by Buck Owens and his Buckaroos
- Released: March 10, 1965
- Recorded: December 1964
- Studio: Capitol (Hollywood)
- Genre: Country
- Length: 31:59
- Label: Capitol ST-2283
- Producer: Ken Nelson

Buck Owens and his Buckaroos chronology
I Don't Care (1964)	I've Got a Tiger by the Tail (1965)	Before You Go (1965)

Singles from I've Got a Tiger By the Tail
- 1. "I've Got a Tiger By the Tail" Released: December 28, 1964

I've Got a Tiger by the Tail is the third studio album (and Owens eighth overall) by American band Buck Owens and his Buckaroos, released in 1965. It reached Number one on the Billboard Country chart and Number 43 on the Pop Albums chart.

It was re-released on CD in 1995 by Sundazed Music with two bonus tracks, both live performances recorded in Bakersfield, California, at the Civic Auditorium in October 1963. The album was included in Robert Dimery's 1001 Albums You Must Hear Before You Die.

== Style ==
The album was an example of Bakersfield sound, country music developed in the mid to late 1950s around Bakersfield, California, and influenced both by rock and what was called hillbilly music. The album featured the distinctive sound of Don Rich playing the Telecaster.

== Reception ==
Professional ratings
Review scores
Source	Rating
AllMusic	5/5 stars

In his AllMusic review, critic Cub Koda called the album "Owens' Bakersfield honky tonk sound at the height of its freight-train rumbling powers." The album was Billboard's first number one country album of the year, in 1965.

== Track listing ==
Side one

1. "I've Got a Tiger By the Tail" (Harlan Howard, Buck Owens) – 2:12
2. "Trouble and Me" (Howard) – 1:54
3. "Let the Sad Times Roll On" (Owens, Red Simpson) – 2:14
4. "Wham Bam" (Buck Owens, Bonnie Owens, Don Rich) – 2:01
5. "If You Fall Out of Love With Me" (Owens, Owens) – 2:15
6. "Fallin' for You" (Owens, Owens, Rich) – 2:01

Side two

7. "We're Gonna Let the Good Times Roll" (Owens) – 2:15
8. "The Band Keeps Playin' On" (Red Simpson, Fuzzy Owen) – 3:02
9. "Streets of Laredo" – 2:55
10. "Cryin' Time" (Owens) – 2:30
11. "A Maiden's Prayer" (Bob Wills) – 2:33
12. "Memphis" (Chuck Berry) – 2:27

=== 1995 bonus tracks ===
13. "This Ol' Heart" (Eddie Miller, Bob Morris) – 1:12
14. "Act Naturally" (Johnny Russell, Voni Morrison) – 2:28

== Personnel ==
- Buck Owens – guitar, vocals
- Don Rich – guitar, fiddle, vocals (lead vocal on "Wham Bam")
- Doyle Holly – bass, guitar, vocals (lead vocal on "Streets of Laredo")
- Tom Brumley – pedal steel guitar, guitar
- Willie Cantu – drums
- Mel King – drums
- Bob Morris – bass, vocals
- Jay McDonald – pedal steel guitar
- Jelly Sanders – fiddle, guitar

== Charts ==
=== Weekly charts ===
Chart performance for I've Got a Tiger By the Tail
Chart (1965)	Peak position
Norwegian Albums (VG-lista)	5
US Billboard 200	43
US Top Country Albums (Billboard)	1

=== Year-end charts ===
1965 year-end chart performance for I've Got a Tiger By the Tail
Chart (1965)	Position
US Top Country Albums (Billboard)	1
