= Give Me Forty Acres (To Turn This Rig Around) =

Single by The Willis Brothers

from the album Give Me Forty Acres
- B-side: "Gonna Buy Me a Juke Box"
- Released: 1964
- Genre: Country, truck-driving country, rockabilly, bluegrass
- Length: 2:33
- Label: Starday
- Songwriter(s): Earl Green, John Green
- Producer(s): Tommy Hill

The Willis Brothers singles chronology
"Give Me Forty Acres (To Turn This Rig Around)" (1964)	"A Six Foot Two by Four" (1965)

"Give Me Forty Acres (To Turn This Rig Around)" is a single by American country music group The Willis Brothers. Released in 1964, it was the first single from their album Give Me Forty Acres. The song peaked at number 9 on the Billboard Hot Country Singles chart. It also reached number 1 on the RPM Country Tracks chart in Canada.

== Chart performance ==
Chart (1964)	Peak position
U.S. Billboard Hot Country Singles	9
Canadian RPM Country Tracks	1
