= Saginaw, Michigan (song) =

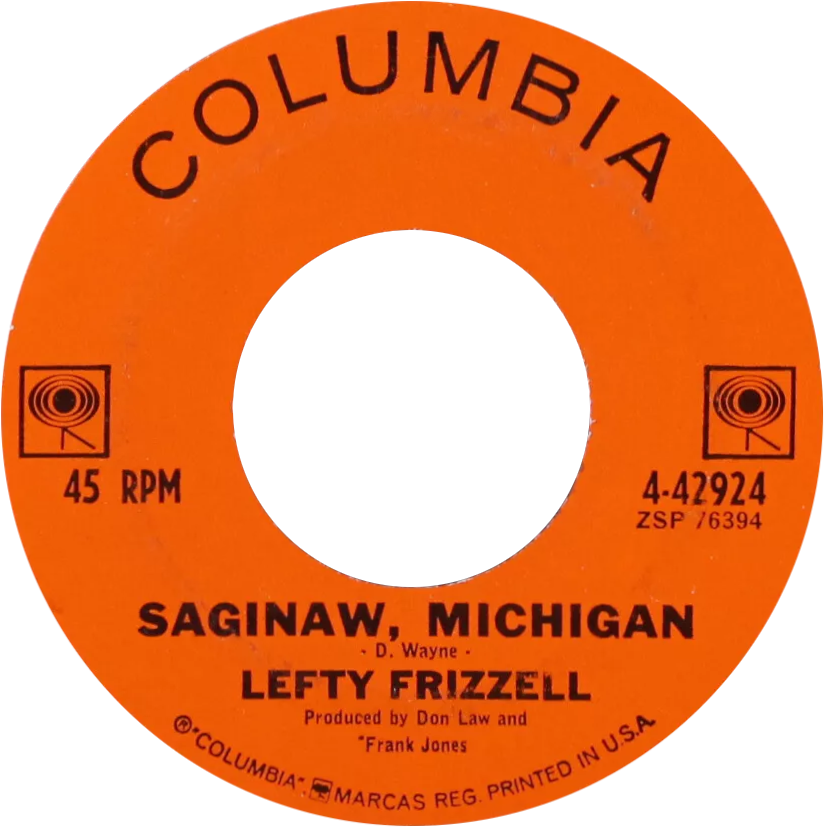
- Side A of the US single

Single by Lefty Frizzell

from the album Saginaw, Michigan
- B-side: "When It Rains the Blues"
- Released: November 26, 1963
- Recorded: October 16, 1963
- Genre: Country
- Length: 3:05
- Label: Columbia
- Songwriters: Bill Anderson, Don Wayne
- Producers: Don Law and Frank Jones

Lefty Frizzell singles chronology
| "Don't Let Her See Me Cry" (1963) | "Saginaw, Michigan" (1963) | "The Nester" (1964) |

"Saginaw, Michigan" is a 1964 song performed by Lefty Frizzell. The single was Lefty Frizzell's sixth and final number one on the U.S. country chart. "Saginaw, Michigan" spent a total of 23 weeks on the country chart and peaked at number 85 on the Billboard Hot 100. The song earned Lefty Frizzell a Grammy Award nomination.

== Synopsis ==
The song is sung from the point of view of the working-class son of a fisherman from the titular city of Saginaw, Michigan, who falls in love with the daughter of a much wealthier man. The rich man does not believe the singer is worthy of his daughter, so the singer travels north to Alaska in hopes of finding gold. When there is no gold, the singer concocts a ruse and returns to Saginaw: he tells the wealthy man that he had struck a huge amount of gold and sells the worthless plot to the rich man for him to develop.

The song ends with the bamboozled rich man searching in vain for the gold in Alaska, while his daughter gladly accepts the singer's hand in marriage.

== Chart performance ==
| Chart (1964) | Peak position |
|---|---|
| U.S. Billboard Hot Country Singles | 1 |
| U.S. Billboard Hot 100 | 85 |

== Cover versions ==
- The song was covered by Bobby Bare on his 1966 LP, The Streets of Baltimore.
- The song was covered by Johnny Cash between 1973 and 1982 and was included in his 2006 album, Personal File.
- The song was covered by Jim Ringer on his 1975 LP, Any Old Wind That Blows.
- The song was covered by Leo Kottke for his 1983 LP, Time Step.
- The song was also recorded by John Prine and Mac Wiseman for their 2007 CD, Standard Songs for Average People.
- Randy Travis included a cover version on his 2013 CD Influence Vol. 1: The Man I Am
- George Jones's cover of the song became very popular and was included on various George Jones compilation albums.
