= Jim Nesbitt =

American country music singer-songwriter (1931–2007)

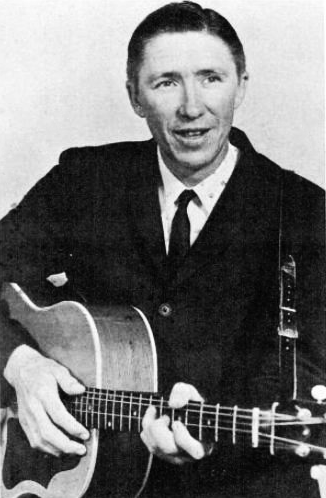
- Nesbitt in 1965

Background information
- Born: James Thomas Nesbitt, Jr. December 1, 1931
- Origin: Bishopville, South Carolina, U.S.
- Died: November 29, 2007 (aged 75)
- Genres: Country
- Occupation: Singer-songwriter
- Years active: 1961–1978
- Labels: Dot, Chart, Smash

James Thomas Nesbitt, Jr. (December 1, 1931 – November 29, 2007) was an American country music singer. He had his first hit with "Please Mr. Kennedy" in 1961. It was released on Dot Records and became a number 11 hit on the Billboard charts. His biggest hit, "Lookin' for More in '64", got to number 7. He also recorded "A Tiger In My Tank". It stayed on the Cash Box charts for 13 weeks. He had several other hits on the Chart label. He released his last album, Phone Call From The Devil, in 1975 on Scorpion Records.

Nesbitt died of congestive heart failure on November 29, 2007, at age 75.

== Discography ==
=== Albums ===
Year	Album	US Country	Label
1964	Your Favorite Comedy and Heart Songs	—	Chart
1968	Truck Drivin' Cat with Nine Wives	26	Chart
1970	Runnin' Bare	—	Chart
1971	The Best of Jim Nesbitt	—	Chart
1978	Phone Call from the Devil	—	Scorpion

=== Singles ===
Year	Single	Chart Positions		Album
Year	Single	US Country	CAN Country	Album
1961	"Please Mr. Kennedy"	11	—	singles only
1963	"Livin' Offa Credit"	28	—	singles only
1964	"Looking for More in '64"	7	—	Your Favorite Comedy and Heart Songs
1964	"Mother-in-Law"	20	—	Your Favorite Comedy and Heart Songs
1965	"A Tiger in My Tank"	15	—	singles only
1965	"Still Alive in '65"	34	—	singles only
1965	"The Friendly Undertaker"	21	—	singles only
1966	"You Better Watch Your Friends"	49	—	Your Favorite Comedy and Heart Songs
1966	"She Didn't Come Home"	—	—	singles only
1966	"Heck of a Fix in 66"	38	—	singles only
1966	"Stranded"	60	—	singles only
1967	"Husbands-in-Law"	74	—	singles only
1967	"Quittin' Time"	—	—	singles only
1968	"Truck Drivin' Cat with Nine Wives"	63	—	Truck Drivin' Cat with Nine Wives
1968	"Clean the Slate in '68"	—	—	single only
1968	"Six Broken Hearts"	—	—	Runnin' Bare
1969	"If You See Me Brother"	—	—	Runnin' Bare
1969	"Intoxicated Frustrated Me"	—	—	Truck Drivin' Cat with Nine Wives
1970	"Runnin' Bare"	20	2	Runnin' Bare
1970	"My Old Drinking Friends"	—	—	Runnin' Bare
1970	"Pollution"	—	—	Runnin' Bare
1971	"I Love Them Old Nasty Cigarettes"	—	—	single only
1971	"Havin' Fun in '71"	—	—	The Best of Jim Nesbitt
1971	"Going Home to Die"	—	—	singles only
1973	"Bars Put Me Behind Those Bars"	—	—	singles only
1973	"Whiskey Sampler"	—	—	singles only
