= I Don't Care (Just as Long as You Love Me) =

- Swedish release picture sleeve

Single by Buck Owens

from the album I Don't Care
- B-side: "Don't Let Her Know"
- Released: August 3, 1964
- Genre: Country
- Length: 2:10
- Label: Capitol
- Songwriter(s): Buck Owens
- Producer(s): Ken Nelson

Buck Owens singles chronology
"My Heart Skips a Beat" (1964)	"I Don't Care (Just as Long as You Love Me)" (1964)	"I've Got a Tiger By the Tail" (1964)

"I Don't Care (Just as Long as You Love Me)" is a 1964 single by Buck Owens, and was his fourth number one on the country chart. "I Don't Care (Just as Long as You Love Me)" spent six weeks at number one and a total of twenty-seven weeks on the chart. The B-side of the song, "Don't Let Her Know", peaked at number thirty-three on the country chart.

== Chart performance ==
Chart (1964)	Peak position
U.S. Billboard Hot Country Singles	1
U.S. Billboard Hot 100	92
Canadian RPM Country Tracks	1
