= Begging to You =

Single by Marty Robbins
- B-side: "Over High Mountain"
- Released: October 8, 1963
- Genre: Country
- Label: Columbia
- Songwriter(s): Marty Robbins

Marty Robbins singles chronology
| "Not So Long Ago" (1963) | "Begging to You" (1963) | "Girl from Spanish Town" (1964) |

"Begging to You" is a song written and recorded by American country music artist Marty Robbins. It was released in October 1963. The song was Robbins' tenth number one on the country chart. The song spent three weeks at the top spot and a total of twenty-three weeks on the charts.

== Chart performance ==
| Chart (1963–1964) | Peak position |
|---|---|
| US Hot Country Songs (Billboard) | 1 |
| US Billboard Hot 100 | 74 |
