= Understand Your Man =

Single by Johnny Cash

from the album I Walk the Line
- B-side: "Dark as a Dungeon"
- Released: January 1964
- Recorded: June 1963
- Genre: Country, folk
- Length: 2:42
- Label: Columbia
- Songwriter: Johnny Cash
- Producers: Don Law; Frank Jones

Johnny Cash singles chronology
"The Matador" (1963)	"Understand Your Man" (1964)	"Dark as a Dungeon" (1964)

"Understand Your Man" is a song written and recorded by American singer Johnny Cash. It was released in January 1964 as the first single from the album I Walk the Line. The single went to #1 on the country charts for six weeks. The song also crossed over to the Top 40, peaking at #35.

Cash Box described it as "a medium-paced, rhythmic ditty which offers a meaningful plea for man-woman understanding."

Cash borrowed parts of the melody from Bob Dylan's "Don't Think Twice, It's All Right", which itself is borrowed from the song "Who's Gonna Buy You Ribbons When I'm Gone".

It was also the last song Cash ever performed in front of an audience. It was the last song in his performance at the Carter Family Fold in Hiltons, Virginia, on 5 July 2003. Prior to singing it, Cash told the audience that at that point he had not performed it live in 25 years. (It was not, however, the final song he ever sang as, despite failing health, he continued to make studio recordings until late August 2003, shortly before his death.)

== Chart performance ==
Chart (1964)	Peak position
US Hot Country Songs (Billboard)	1
US Billboard Hot 100	35
