= Together Again (Buck Owens song) =

1964 song by Buck Owens

- Norwegian release picture sleeve

Single by Buck Owens

from the album Together Again
- A-side: "My Heart Skips a Beat"
- Released: April 4, 1964
- Genre: Country
- Length: 2:28
- Label: Capitol
- Songwriter: Buck Owens
- Producer: Ken Nelson

Buck Owens singles chronology
"My Heart Skips a Beat" (1964)	"Together Again" (1964)	"I Don't Care (Just as Long as You Love Me)" (1964)

"Together Again"

Single by Ray Charles

from the album Together Again
- B-side: "You're Just About to Lose Your Clown"
- Released: March 1966
- Recorded: 1965
- Genre: Soul
- Length: 2:36
- Label: ABC-Paramount
- Songwriter: Buck Owens

Ray Charles singles chronology
"Crying Time" (1965)	"Together Again" (1966)	"Let's Go Get Stoned" (1966)

"Together Again"

Single by Emmylou Harris

from the album Elite Hotel
- B-side: "One of These Days"
- Released: January 1976
- Recorded: June 1975
- Genre: Country
- Length: 3:56
- Label: Reprise
- Songwriter: Buck Owens
- Producer: Brian Ahern

Emmylou Harris singles chronology
"If I Could Only Win Your Love" (1975)	"Together Again" (1976)	"One of These Days" (1976)

"Together Again" is a 1964 song by American country singer and guitarist Buck Owens.

The song, best known as the "B" side to Owens' No. 1 hit, "My Heart Skips a Beat", interrupted that song's run at Number One on the U.S. country charts. Steel guitarist Tom Brumley's performance on "Together Again" is considered "one of the finest steel guitar solos in the history of country music" by the Country Music Television staff; it inspired Jerry Garcia to learn the instrument.

== Covers ==
- Ray Price on his 1965 album Burning Memories
- Brendan O'Brien And The Dixies' recording of the song spent thirteen weeks in the Irish Singles Charts from January to April 1966, peaking at number 4 on 14 February, appropriately.
- Ray Charles released the song in 1966, and it reached #19 on the Billboard pop chart and #1 on the adult contemporary chart. On the soul chart, this version went to #10.
- Glen Campbell on his 1967 album Burning Bridges
- Wanda Jackson on her 1968 album Cream of the Crop
- Eddie Peregrina on his 1968 album What Am I Living For
- Farhad Mehrad
- Nora Aunor with Tirso Cruz III on their 1971 duet album Dream Come True
- Country music singer Emmylou Harris recorded the song for her 1975 album Elite Hotel; her version also ascended to the top of the Billboard Hot Country Singles chart in April 1976, with the flip side, Harris' version of The Beatles' "Here, There and Everywhere" being a minor pop hit as well. In 1979, Owens and Harris dueted on a song called "Play Together Again, Again," which paid tribute to the song both artists recorded and made famous.
- In 1983, Kenny Rogers and Dottie West released a duet version of the song (it originally was recorded for their 1979 Classics album, but was released on Rogers' Duets album in 1983), that reached No. 19 on the Hot Country Singles chart.
- Norwegian singer Elisabeth Andreasson covered the song on her 1981 country album Angel of the Morning.
- Richard and Linda Thompson recorded a version in May 1973 included in the album I Want to See the Bright Lights Tonight, released in April 1974.
- Dwight Yoakam recorded a version of the song for his 2007 Buck Owens tribute album, Dwight Sings Buck.
- Mark Lanegan recorded a version of the song for his 1999 album I'll Take Care of You.
- Martina McBride recorded a version of the song for her 2005 album My Heart.
- Swedish singer Jill Johnson covered the song on her 2009 cover album Music Row II.
- Vince Gill recorded a version of the song for his 2013 album with steel guitarist Paul Franklin, Bakersfield
- Louise Mandrell recorded a version of the song for her 2019 album, Playing Favorites.
- Ronnie Dunn recorded a version of the song for his 2020 album of covers, Re-Dunn.
- My Morning Jacket recorded a version of the song for their 2026 album, Peacelands
