= Love's Gonna Live Here =

- Swedish release picture sleeve

Single by Buck Owens

from the album The Best of Buck Owens
- B-side: "Getting Used to Losing You"
- Released: August 19, 1963
- Genre: Country
- Label: Capitol Nashville
- Songwriter: Buck Owens
- Producer: Ken Nelson

Buck Owens singles chronology
"Act Naturally" (1963)	"Love's Gonna Live Here" (1963)	"My Heart Skips a Beat" (1964)

"Love's Gonna Live Here" is a 1963 single by Buck Owens, who also wrote the song. The single would be Buck Owens' second number one on the country charts spending sixteen weeks at the top spot and a total of thirty weeks on the chart.

After "Love's Gonna Live Here" finished its 16-week stay at No. 1, no other song would spend more than 10 weeks at No. 1 for 49 years; the closest any song came was 2 1/2 years later, with David Houston's "Almost Persuaded" spending nine weeks at No. 1 from August to October 1966. On January 12, 2013, "We Are Never Ever Getting Back Together" by Taylor Swift would become the first song since "Love's Gonna Live Here" to spend at least 10 weeks at No. 1.

On July 6, 2013, "Cruise" by Florida Georgia Line surpassed the 16-weeks-at-No.-1 longevity of "Love's Gonna Live Here" on the Billboard Hot Country Songs chart when that song logged its 17th week at No. 1, something that had not happened in more than 49 years.

== Chart performance ==
Chart (1963)	Peak position
U.S. Billboard Hot Country Singles	1

== Cover versions ==
- Sten & Stanley on the 1994 album Musik, dans & party 10 as "Nu leker livet igen".
- Waylon Jennings - On the album Waylon at JD's (Sound Limited), released in December 1964
- Wanda Jackson - On the album The Happy Side of Wanda Jackson (Capitol), released in 1969
- Emmylou Harris - On the album Last Date, released in 1982.
- Martina McBride - On the album Timeless (RCA), released on October 10, 2005
- The Derailers - On the album Under the Influence of Buck (Palo Duro Records), released on July 31, 2007
- Dwight Yoakam - On the album Dwight Sings Buck (New West), released on October 23, 2007
- Tanya Tucker – On the album My Turn, released on June 30, 2009
