= I Guess I'm Crazy =

Single by Jim Reeves

from the album The Best Of Jim Reeves Vol. II
- B-side: "Not Until the Next Time"
- Released: June 1964
- Recorded: 1955
- Genre: Country
- Label: RCA
- Songwriter: Werly Fairburn
- Producer: Chet Atkins

Jim Reeves singles chronology
"Love Is No Excuse" (1964)	"I Guess I'm Crazy" (1964)	"I Won't Forget You" (1965)

"I Guess I'm Crazy" is a 1955 song composed by Werly Fairburn. The song was first recorded in 1955 by Tommy Collins who peaked at number thirteen on the C&W Best Seller chart.

== Jim Reeves version ==
- In 1964, Jim Reeves had his first of six posthumous number one hits on the U.S. country music chart with his version of "I Guess I'm Crazy", which spent seven weeks at the top and a total of twenty-four weeks on the chart. On the Easy Listening charts it peaked at number eighteen. "I Guess I'm Crazy" also topped the Canadian charts for a single week, making this song to be the first song ever to top the newly formed RPM Country charts in Canada.

== Chart performance ==
=== Tommy Collins ===
Chart (1955)	Peak position
U.S. Billboard Hot Country Singles	13

=== Jim Reeves ===
Chart (1964)	Peak position
Canadian RPM Country Tracks	1
New Zealand Lever Hit Parade	6
U.S. Billboard Hot Country Singles	1
U.S. Billboard Easy Listening Singles	17
U.S. Billboard Hot 100	82

== Other Cover Versions ==
- It was later covered in April 1965 By Irish Country singer Larry Cunningham, and peaked #4 at the Irish charts.
