= My Heart Skips a Beat =

- Norwegian release picture sleeve

Single by Buck Owens

from the album Together Again
- B-side: "Together Again"
- Released: February 24, 1964
- Genre: Country
- Label: Capitol
- Songwriter(s): Buck Owens
- Producer(s): Ken Nelson

Buck Owens singles chronology
"Love's Gonna Live Here" (1963)	"My Heart Skips a Beat" (1964)	"I Don't Care (Just as Long as You Love Me)" (1964)

"My Heart Skips a Beat" is a 1964 single written and performed by Buck Owens.

== Background ==
The single was Owens's third number one on the U.S. country singles chart. "My Heart Skips a Beat" spent seven non-consecutive weeks at the top with a total of twenty-six weeks on the chart. The B-side, "Together Again", also hit number one on the country chart both replacing and being replaced by "My Heart Skips a Beat" from the top spot. The song was the Billboard's Top Country Single for the year 1964.

== Chart performance ==
Chart (1964)	Peak position
U.S. Billboard Hot Country Singles	1
U.S. Billboard Hot 100	94
