= Roger Miller discography =

- Studio albums: 15
- Live albums: 1
- Compilation albums: 72
- Singles: 52
- No.1 Single: 3

The discography for American country music artist Roger Miller consists of 52 singles and 15 studio albums. Miller released singles between 1957 and 1986, charting two number 1 singles on Hot Country Songs and nine additional Top 10 hits.

== Studio albums ==
=== 1960s ===
Title	Details	Peak chart positions		Certifications (sales threshold)
Title	Details	US Country	US	Certifications (sales threshold)
Roger and Out	Release date: May 1964; Label: Smash Records	3	37	US: Gold
The Return of Roger Miller	Release date: 1965; Label: Smash Records	2	4	US: Gold
The 3rd Time Around	Release date: 1965; Label: Smash Records	1	13	
Words and Music	Release date: 1966; Label: Smash Records	32	108	
Walkin' in the Sunshine	Release date: 1967; Label: Smash Records	15	118	
A Tender Look at Love	Release date: 1968; Label: Smash Records	14	173	
Roger Miller	Release date: 1969; Label: Smash Records	20	163	
"—" denotes releases that did not chart

=== 1970s ===
Title	Details	Peak chart positions		
Title	Details	US Country	US	AUS
Roger Miller 1970	Release date: January 1970; Label: Smash Records	33	200	5
A Trip in the Country	Release date: 1970; Label: Mercury Records	23	—	—
Dear Folks, Sorry I Haven't Written Lately	Release date: 1973; Label: Columbia Records	26	—	—
Supersongs	Release date: 1975; Label: Columbia Records	—	—	—
Off the Wall	Release date: 1977; Label: Windsong Records	—	—	—
Making a Name for Myself	Release date: 1979; Label: 20th Century Fox Records	—	—	—
"—" denotes releases that did not chart

=== 1980s ===
Title	Details
Old Friends (with Willie Nelson)	Release date: 1982; Label: Columbia Records
Roger Miller	Release date: 1986; Label: MCA Records; Miller's last studio album, produced by Jimmy Bowen and Miller, and entirely composed by Miller except for "Some Hearts Get All the Breaks," co-written with Grant Boatwright. The majority of the 10 tunes were originally crafted for Big River. "Days of Our Wives," "Indian Giver," and "Some Hearts Get All the Breaks" are not part of the award-winning Broadway play. When Miller re-signed with Buddy Killen's Tree Publishing in 1985, he re-recorded 18 of his career-defining songs, plus the rare original "Everything's Coming Up Roses" and exclusive covers of "Burning Bridges," "Heartaches By the Number," and "Release Me." These 22 performances were made available to advertising agencies and finally collected on CD by Laserlight Records in the wake of Miller's death.

== Soundtrack and Original Broadway Cast albums ==
Title	Details	Peak chart positions		Certifications (sales threshold)
Title	Details	US Country	US	Certifications (sales threshold)
Waterhole #3 (Code of the West)	Release date: 1967; Label: Smash Records; Miller mixes narration and singing throughout the nine tracks written by Bob Wells and Dave Grusin.	42	—	
Story and Songs from 'Robin Hood'	Release date: 1973; Label: Disneyland; Miller supplied "Whistle Stop," "Oo-De-Lally," "Not in Nottingham," "Reprise: Whistle Stop," and narration as Alan-a-Dale, the lute-playing rooster	—	—	
Big River: The Adventures of Huckleberry Finn	Release date: 1985; Label: MCA Records; Music and Lyrics by Miller; The original Broadway cast handles all vocals; Miller reworked seven of the songs for his final studio album, 1986's self-titled Roger Miller, with Big River producer Jimmy Bowen	—	—	

== Compilation albums ==
=== 1960s and 1970s ===
Title	Details	Peak chart positions		Certifications (sales threshold)
Title	Details	US Country	US	Certifications (sales threshold)
Roger Miller (The Tunes That Launched the Roger Miller Career)	Release date: 1964; Label: RCA Camden; Ten of Miller's 1960-1962 recordings for RCA Victor make their LP debut including the C&W hits "(In the Summertime) You Don't Want My Love," "When Two Worlds Collide," and "Lock, Stock, and Teardrops"	—	—	
The One and Only	Release date: 1965; Label: RCA Camden; Ten more of Miller's 1960-1962 RCA Victor recordings debut on LP	—	—	
Wild Child: Madcap Sensation of Country Music	Release date: 1965; Label: Starday Records; a dozen of Miller's 1959-1960 recordings, made while he was writing for other artists, appear on vinyl for the first time	—	—	
Golden Hits	Release date: 1965; Label: Smash Records	2	6	US: Gold
The Country Side of Roger Miller	Release date: 1965; Label: Starday Records	—	—	
Roger Miller featuring Dang Me!	Release date: 1969; Label: Smash Records	—	—	
King of the Road	Release date: 1971; Label: Hilltop Records	—	—	
The Best of Roger Miller	Release date: 1972; Label: Mercury Records	19	—	
Celebration	Release date: 1976; Label: RCA Records	—	—	—
Painted Poetry	Release date: 1977; Label: Starday Records	—	—	—
"—" denotes releases that did not chart

=== 1980s and 1990s ===
Title	Details
Green Green Grass of Home	Release date: 1988; Label: PolyGram
The Best of Roger Miller, Vol. 1: Country Tunesmith	Release date: 1991; Label: Mercury Records
The Best of Roger Miller: His Greatest Songs	Release date: 1991; Label: Curb Records
King of the Road: The Best of Roger Miller	Release date: 1992; Label: Laserlight Records; Contains 11 re-recordings of Miller's greatest hits done in 1985
Dang Me: The Best of Roger Miller	Release date: 1992; Label: Laserlight Records; Features the remaining 11 re-recordings of Miller's greatest hits completed in 1985
The Best of Roger Miller, Vol. 2: King of the Road	Release date: 1992; Label: Mercury Records
King of the Road	Release date: 1992; Label: Epic Records
Greatest Hits	Release date: 1993; Label: Pair Records
Country Spotlight	Release date: 1993; Label: Dominion Records
Legendary Hits	Release date: 1993; Label: Metacom Records
The Hits of Roger Miller	Release date: 1994; Label: Essex Records
King of the Road	Release date: 1994; Label: Bear Family Records
Dang Me: Hits	Release date: 1994; Label: Drive Archive Records
At His Best	Release date: 1995; Label: PSM Records
King of the Road	Release date: 1995; Label: Richmond Records
The Best of Roger Miller	Release date: 1995; Label: Griffin Records
Super Hits	Release date: 1996; Label: Epic Records
Golden Classics: 22 Classic Tracks	Release date: 1996; Label: Masters Intercontinental
Country Classics	Release date: 1996; Label: Critique Records
Dang Me	Release date: 1996; Label: Kingfisher Records
King of the Road	Release date: 1996; Label: Kingfisher Records
Hits	Release date: 1997; Label: Mercury Records
The Very Best of Roger Miller	Release date: 1997; Label: Bellaphon Records
King of the Road: His Greatest Hits	Release date: 1998; Label: Hallmark Records
The Best of Roger Miller	Release date: 1998; Label: Spectrum Records
King of the Road: Greatest Hits and Favorites	Release date: 1998; Label: Country Stars Records
Great Performances: Encore Collection	Release date: 1998; Label: BMG Special Products
Golden Hits	Release date: 1998; Label: Intercontinental Records
Greatest Hits	Release date: 1999; Label: Unison Records
Greatest Hits	Release date: 1999; Label: Platinum Disc Records
20th Century Masters - The Millennium Collection: The Best of Roger Miller	Release date: 1999; Label: MCA Records
Country Music Hall of Fame 1995	Release date: 1999; Label: King Records

=== 2000s ===
Title	Details
The Best of Country	Release date: 2000; Label: Direct Source Records
Country Gold: King of the Road	Release date: 2000; Label: Direct Source Records
The Very Best of Roger Miller	Release date: 2000; Label: Summit Records
Good Old Country	Release date: 2000; Label: St. Clair Records
Oh Boy Records Classics Presents Roger Miller	Release date: 2000; Label: Oh Boy Records
King of the Road	Release date: 2000; Label: Legend Records
Roger Miller	Release date: 2000; Label: RCA Records
Pure Country	Release date: 2001; Label: Sony Music Entertainment
The Best of Roger Miller	Release date: 2001; Label: St. Clair Records
The Masters	Release date: 2002; Label: Eagle Rock Entertainment
Roger Miller Classics	Release date: 2002; Label: Varèse Sarabande
David Allan Coe Presents Roger Miller	Release date: 2002; Label: Coe Pop Records
All Time Greatest Hits	Release date: 2003; Label: Mercury Records
King of the Road	Release date: 2003; Label: Prism Records
Roger Miller	Release date: 2003; Label: Reader's Digest/Navarre
World of Roger Miller	Release date: 2004; Label: Universal International
Platinum & Gold Collection	Release date: 2004; Label: RCA Nashville/BMG Heritage
Country Legends	Release date: 2004; Label: St. Clair Records
At His Best	Release date: 2004; Label: Collectables Records
King of the Road	Release date: 2005; Label: CBuJ Entertainment
King of the Road	Release date: 2005; Label: Brentwood Records
King of the Road: The Best of Roger Miller	Release date: 2005; Label: K-tel Entertainment
King of the Road (CD/DVD)	Release date: 2005; Label: Brentwood Records
Best of Roger Miller, Vol. 2	Release date: 2006; Label: Platinum Disc Records
The Best of Roger Miller, Vol. 1	Release date: 2006; Label: Platinum Disc Records
Chug a Lug	Release date: 2006; Label: CBuJ Entertainment
Country Hit Parade	Release date: 2006; Label: Direct Source Records
A Man Like Me: The Early Years of Roger Miller	Release date: 2006; Label: Bear Family Records
Timeless Hits	Release date: 2007; Label: KRB Music
Pure	Release date: 2007; Label: Direct Source Records

== Live album ==
Title	Details
Roger Miller Live!	Release date: 1997; Label: Silver Eagle Records; 12 songs, including the rarities "Fraulein" and "That's When the Loving's Done," as recorded on May 8, 1982, at Billy Bob's in Fort Worth, Texas; Reissued as "Live" by EMI-Capitol Special Markets in 2000 and Hits You Remember: Live by Madacy Entertainment in 2001

== Box set ==
Title	Details
King of the Road: The Genius of Roger Miller	Release date: 1995; Label: Mercury Records

== Tribute album ==
Title	Details
King of the Road: A Tribute to Roger Miller	Release date: 2018; Label: BMG

== Singles ==
=== 1950s and 1960s ===
Year	Single	Peak chart positions								Album
Year	Single	US Country	US	US AC	CAN Country	CAN	CAN AC	UK	AUS	Album
1957	"My Pillow" b/w "Poor Little John"	—	—	—	—	—	—	—	—	Wild Child: Madcap Sensation of Country Music
1958	"You're Forgettin' Me"	—	—	—	—	—	—	—	—	Wild Child: Madcap Sensation of Country Music
1958	"On This Mountain Top" [credited to Donny Young with Roger Miller]	—	—	—	—	—	—	—	—	—N/a
1958	"Mine Is a Lonely Life" [credited to Justin Tubb with Roger Miller]	—	—	—	—	—	—	—	—	—N/a
1959	"Wrong Kind of Girl"	—	—	—	—	—	—	—	—	—N/a
1959	"Jason Fleming"	—	—	—	—	—	—	—	—	—N/a
1960	"You Don't Want My Love" (a.k.a. "In the Summertime") [Original 1960 version for RCA Victor]	14	—	—	—	—	—	—	11	Roger Miller (The Tunes That Launched the Roger Miller Career)
1961	"When Two Worlds Collide"	6	—	—	—	—	—	—	—	Roger Miller (The Tunes That Launched the Roger Miller Career)
1961	"Fair Swiss Maiden"	—	—	—	—	—	—	—	—	Roger Miller (The Tunes That Launched the Roger Miller Career)
1962	"Sorry Willie"/"Hitch-hiker"	—	—	—	—	—	—	—	—	Roger Miller (The Tunes That Launched the Roger Miller Career)
1962	"Hey Little Star"	—	—	—	—	—	—	—	—	Roger Miller (The Tunes That Launched the Roger Miller Career)
1963	"Lock, Stock and Teardrops"	26	—	—	—	—	—	—	—	Roger Miller (The Tunes That Launched the Roger Miller Career)
1964	"Dang Me"	1	7	—	3	6	—	—	19	Roger and Out
1964	"Chug-a-Lug"	3	9	—	3	23	—	—	42	Roger and Out
1965	"Do-Wacka-Do"	15	31	—	—	38	—	—	93	The Return of Roger Miller
1965	"King of the Road"	1	4	1	—	10	—	1	16	The Return of Roger Miller
1965	"Engine Engine #9"	2	7	2	—	11	—	33	70	The 3rd Time Around
1965	"One Dyin' and a Buryin'"	10	34	8	—	—	—	—	—	The 3rd Time Around
1965	"Kansas City Star"	7	31	3	—	9	—	48	81	The 3rd Time Around
1965	"England Swings"	3	8	1	—	—	—	13	23	Golden Hits
1966	"Husbands and Wives"	5	26	2	—	14	10	—	37	Words and Music
1966	"You Can't Rollerskate in a Buffalo Herd"	35	40	17	—	39	—	—	—	The Return of Roger Miller
1966	"My Uncle Used to Love Me But She Died"	39	58	—	—	26	—	—	79	Words and Music
1966	"Heartbreak Hotel"	55	84	—	—	—	—	—	—	Words and Music
1967	"Walkin' in the Sunshine"	7	37	6	—	29	—	—	38	Walkin' in the Sunshine
1967	"The Ballad of Waterhole #3 (Code of the West)"	27	102	—	20	—	—	—	—	Ballad of Waterhole #3 (Code of the West)
1967	"Old Toy Trains"	—	—	—	—	—	—	—	—	non-LP single, charted Billboard #13 Christmas
1968	"Little Green Apples"	6	39	5	33	43	—	19	46	A Tender Look at Love
1968	"Tolivar"	—	—	—	—	—	—	—	—	A Tender Look at Love
1969	"Vance"	15	80	15	5	40	—	—	77	Roger Miller
1969	"Me and Bobby McGee"	12	122	—	3	—	—	—	—	Roger Miller
1969	"Where Have All the Average People Gone"	14	—	—	14	—	—	—	52	Roger Miller
"—" denotes releases that did not chart

=== 1970s and 1980s ===
Year	Single	Peak chart positions						Album
Year	Single	US Country	US	US AC	CAN Country	CAN AC	AUS	Album
1970	"The Tom Green County Fair"	36	—	—	32	—	60	Roger Miller 1970
1970	"South"	15	—	—	24	—	72	The Best of Roger Miller
1971	"Tomorrow Night in Baltimore"	11	—	—	13	—	—	The Best of Roger Miller
1971	"Lovin' Her Was Easier (Than Anything I'll Ever Do Again)"	28	—	—	8	11	94	The Best of Roger Miller
1972	"We Found It in Each Other's Arms"	34	—	—	—	—	—	—N/a
1972	"Sunny Side of My Life"	63	—	—	—	—	—	—N/a
1972	"Rings for Sale"	41	—	—	27	—	—	—N/a
1973	"Hoppy's Gone"	42	—	—	53	—	—	—N/a
1973	"Open Up Your Heart"	14	105	20	8	—	89	Dear Folks Sorry I Haven't Written Lately
1973	"I Believe in the Sunshine"	24	—	—	85	—	—	Dear Folks Sorry I Haven't Written Lately
1974	"Whistle Stop"	86	—	—	—	—	—	Dear Folks Sorry I Haven't Written Lately
1975	"Our Love"	44	—	—	—	—	—	Supersongs
1975	"I Love a Rodeo"	57	—	—	—	—	—	Supersongs
1977	"Baby Me Baby"	68	—	—	—	—	—	Off the Wall
1977	"Oklahoma Woman"	—	—	—	—	—	—	Off the Wall
1979	"The Hat"	98	—	—	—	—	—	Making a Name for Myself
1981	"Everyone Gets Crazy Now and Then"	36	—	—	—	—	—	—N/a
1982	"Old Friends" (with Willie Nelson and Ray Price)	19	—	—	18	—	—	Old Friends
1985	"River in the Rain"	36	—	—	—	—	—	Roger Miller
1986	"Some Hearts Get All the Breaks"	81	—	—	—	—	—	Roger Miller
"—" denotes releases that did not chart

== Charted B-sides ==
Year	Single	Peak chart positions				Original A-side
Year	Single	US Country	US	US AC	AUS	Original A-side
1965	"It Happened Just That Way"	—	105	26	—	"One Dyin' and a Buryin'"
1966	"I've Been a Long Time Leavin' (But I'll Be a Long Time Gone)"	13	103	—	flip	"Husbands and Wives"
1969	"Little Children Run and Play"	—	—	—	flip	"Vance"
1969	"Boeing Boeing 707"	—	—	—	flip	"Where Have All The Average People Gone"
1970	"Don't We All Have the Right"	flip	—	—	—	"South"
1981	"Aladambama"	flip	—	—	—	"Everyone Gets Crazy Now and Then"
"—" denotes releases that did not chart
