= King of the Road: A Tribute to Roger Miller =

Compilation album by Various artists
- Released: August 31, 2018
- Genre: Country
- Length: 90:04
- Label: BMG
- Producer: Colby Barnum Wright, Mikal Blue, Buddy Cannon, Dean Miller, John Carter Cash, Luke Laird, Shane McAnally, The Earls of Leicester, Ronnie Dunn

King of the Road: A Tribute to Roger Miller is a 2018 double‑album tribute compilation honoring American singer‑songwriter Roger Miller. It was released on August 31, 2018, by BMG as a two‑disc CD set and in digital formats. The project features 37 tracks performed by a wide range of prominent country, Americana, bluegrass, and pop artists.

== Background and production ==
The tribute album was conceived to celebrate Roger Miller's songwriting legacy and to introduce his catalog to new audiences. Rolling Stone reported that the project was assembled with the participation of Miller's family and included both newly recorded tracks and archival banter segments from Miller himself.

Cowboys & Indians described the album as a broad survey of Miller's work, highlighting both humorous and introspective songs.

== Critical reception ==
The album received generally positive reviews.

NPR praised the compilation for its “first‑rate performances,” noting that the artists approached Miller's material with “warmth, humor, and emotional clarity.” American Songwriter called the project a “wide‑ranging and affectionate tribute” that underscored Miller's versatility. The Santa Fe New Mexican described the album as a “comprehensive and spirited salute” to Miller's catalog. Country Standard Time wrote that the album “overwhelms the listener with Miller’s obvious skills,” praising both the performances and the song selection.

== Track listing ==
Disc one
No.	Title	Artist(s)	Length
1.	"Greatest Songwriter (Banter)"	Roger Miller	0:23
2.	"Chug‑a‑Lug"	Asleep at the Wheel ft. Huey Lewis	2:07
3.	"Dang Me"	Brad Paisley	1:58
4.	"Leavin's Not the Only Way to Go"	Lennon & Maisy / The Stellas	3:40
5.	"Kansas City Star"	Kacey Musgraves	2:31
6.	"World So Full of Love"	Rodney Crowell	3:16
7.	"Old Friends (Banter)"	Roger Miller	0:14
8.	"Old Friends"	Willie Nelson, Kris Kristofferson & Merle Haggard	3:39
9.	"Lock, Stock and Teardrops"	Mandy Barnett	3:26
10.	"You Oughta Be Here with Me / I've Been a Long Time Leaving"	Alison Krauss	4:19
11.	"The Crossing"	Ronnie Dunn ft. The Blind Boys of Alabama	4:08
12.	"In the Summertime"	The Earls of Leicester	2:18
13.	"Fiddle (Banter)"	Roger Miller	0:35
14.	"England Swings"	Lyle Lovett	2:11
15.	"You Can't Rollerskate in a Buffalo Herd"	Opry Stars/Legends	2:16
16.	"Half a Mind"	Loretta Lynn	2:24
17.	"Invitation to the Blues"	Jessi Colter & Shooter Jennings	3:21
18.	"It Only Hurts Me When I Cry (Live)"	Dwight Yoakam	3:06
Total length:			45:52

Disc two
No.	Title	Artist(s)	Length
1.	"Mouth Noises (Banter)"	Roger Miller	0:46
2.	"Oo De Lally"	Eric Church	1:49
3.	"Engine, Engine No. 9"	Emerson Hart	3:10
4.	"When Two Worlds Collide"	Flatt Lonesome	3:11
5.	"Reincarnation"	Cake	3:09
6.	"You Can't Do Me This Way"	Dean Miller	2:29
7.	"Chicken S#$! (Banter)"	Roger Miller	0:32
8.	"Nothing Can Stop My Love"	Toad the Wet Sprocket	2:50
9.	"Husbands and Wives"	Jamey Johnson ft. Emmylou Harris	2:41
10.	"I'll Pick Up My Heart and Go Home"	Lily Meola	2:45
11.	"I Believe in the Sunshine"	Daphne and the Mystery Machines	2:20
12.	"Guv'ment"	John Goodman	2:09
13.	"Old Songwriters Never Die (Banter)"	Roger Miller	0:12
14.	"Hey, Would You Hold It Down?"	Ringo Starr	2:48
15.	"The Last Word in Lonesome Is Me"	Dolly Parton ft. Alison Krauss	3:05
16.	"I'd Come Back to Me"	Radney Foster	2:56
17.	"One Dying and a Burying"	The Dead South	2:13
18.	"Do Wacka Do"	Robert Earl Keen	1:47
19.	"King of the Road"	Roger Miller	3:20
Total length:			44:12
