= King of the Road: The Genius of Roger Miller =

Compilation album by Roger Miller
- Released: 1995
- Genre: Country
- Length: 162:33
- Label: Mercury Records
- Producer: The Country Music Foundation

Roger Miller chronology
Green Green Grass of Home (1994)	King of the Road: The Genius of Roger Miller (1995)

Professional ratings
Review scores
Source	Rating
Allmusic	5/5 stars

King of the Road: The Genius of Roger Miller is a compilation album by Roger Miller released in 1995.

70 songs in chronological order from every label (Mercury/Starday, Decca, RCA, Smash, Columbia, and MCA) for which Roger Miller recorded, and two songs from the Tony Award winning Broadway Musical Big River. Including eight unreleased recordings.

== Track listing ==
All tracks are written by Roger Miller, except where noted.

CD-1
No.	Title	Writer(s)	Length
1.	"My Pillow"		2:11
2.	"Poor Little John"		1:55
3.	"A Man Like Me"		2:25
4.	"The Wrong Kind of Girl"		2:15
5.	"Jason Fleming"		2:02
6.	"A World So Full of Love"		1:58
7.	"When a House is Not a Home"		2:28
8.	"You Don't Want My Love"		1:59
9.	"When Two Worlds Collide"	Miller; Bill Anderson	2:10
10.	"Sorry, Willie"		2:23
11.	"So Saith He, The Lord"		1:12
12.	"Lock Stock & Teardrops"		2:25
13.	"Ain't That Fine?"	Dorsey Burnette	2:33
14.	"Less & Less"		2:27
15.	"Chug-a-Lug"		2:01
16.	"Lou's Got The Flu"		1:45
17.	"The Moon is High (And So Am I)"		1:57
18.	"Dang Me!"		1:47
19.	"It Takes All Kinds to Make a World"		2:36
20.	"Reincarnation"		1:58
21.	"Hard-Headed Me"		2:29
22.	"Do-Wacka-Do"		1:44
23.	"Atta Boy, Girl"		1:54
24.	"Our Hearts Will Play the Music"		2:00

CD-2
No.	Title	Writer(s)	Length
1.	"King of the Road"		2:25
2.	"As Long As There's a Shadow"		2:03
3.	"You Can't Rollerskate in a Buffalo Herd"		1:53
4.	"Heartbreak Hotel"	Elvis Presley; Mae Boren Axton; Tommy Durden	2:12
5.	"Big Harlan Taylor"		2:06
6.	"One Dyin' & A-Buryin'"		2:01
7.	"The Last Word in Lonesome is Me"		2:46
8.	"It Happened Just That Way"		1:51
9.	"Engine, Engine #9"		2:17
10.	"Kansas City Star"		2:17
11.	"England Swings!"		1:52
12.	"I've Been a Long Time Leavin' (But I'll Be a Long Time Gone)"		2:14
13.	"Husbands & Wives"		2:22
14.	"Train of Life"		2:06
15.	"Dad Blame Anything a Man Can't Quit!"	Curly Putman; Miller	2:06
16.	"You're My Kingdom"		2:13
17.	"My Uncle Used to Love Me, But She Died"		1:53
18.	"Home"		1:47
19.	"Absence"		2:34
20.	"Ruby (Don't Take Your Love to Town)"	Mel Tillis	3:00
21.	"Walkin' in the Sunshine"		2:37
22.	"A Million Years or So"		2:30
23.	"Pardon This Coffin"		2:18
24.	"Bonus Track: Session Soundbite"

CD-3
No.	Title	Writer(s)	Length
1.	"The Ballad of Waterhole #3 (Code of the West)"	Dave Grusin; Robert Wells	2:17
2.	"Old Toy Trains"		2:02
3.	"Little Green Apples"	Bobby Russell	2:38
4.	"What I'd Give to Be the Wind"	Curly Putman; Red Lane	2:37
5.	"Boeing, Boeing 707"		1:19
6.	"Treat Me Like a Human"		1:42
7.	"What Are Those Things (With Big Black Wings)?"	A. L. Owens; Dallas Frazier	2:07
8.	"Only Daddy That'll Walk the Line"	Ivy J. Bryant	2:05
9.	"Swiss Cottage Place"	Mickey Newbury	3:27
10.	"Me & Bobby McGee"	Fred Foster; Kris Kristofferson	4:04
11.	"Where Have All the Average People Gone?"	Dennis Linde	3:02
12.	"The Best of All Possible Worlds"	Kristofferson	2:56
13.	"Invitation to the Blues"		2:34
14.	"Tall, Tall Trees"	George Jones; Miller	2:13
15.	"Don't We All Have the Right?"		1:57
16.	"That's the Way I Feel"	Jones; Miller	1:50
17.	"Half a Mind"		2:46
18.	"Hoppy's Gone"	Johnny Slate; Larry Henley; Lane	2:33
19.	"What Would My Mama Say?"		3:08
20.	"Orange Blossom Special" (Live)	E.T. Rouse	3:28
21.	"Old Friends with Ray Price & Willie Nelson"		3:04
22.	"Guv'ment (from Big River)"		2:37
23.	"River in the Rain (from Big River)"		3:52
24.	"Bonus Track: Session Soundbite"

== Production ==
- Producer: The Country Music Foundation
- Annotated and compiled by: Daniel Cooper
- Remastered by: Joseph M. Palmaccio

== Track notes ==
CD-1: Recorded

- 1–1 April–October 1957; (prob.) Houston, Texas
- 1–2 April–October 1957; (prob.) Houston, Texas
- 1–3 December 13, 1958; Nashville, Tennessee
- 1–4 December 13, 1958; Nashville, Tennessee
- 1–5 June 30, 1959; Nashville, Tennessee
- 1-6 circa Summer 1960; Nashville, Tennessee (demo, unissued)
- 1-7 circa 1960; Nashville, Tennessee (radio transcription, unissued)
- 1–8 August 10, 1960; Nashville, Tennessee
- 1–9 February 4, 1961; Nashville, Tennessee
- 1–10 September 19, 1961; Nashville, Tennessee
- 1-11 circa January 1963; Nashville, Tennessee (demo, unissued)
- 1–12 February 14, 1963; Nashville, Tennessee
- 1–13 January 10, 1964; Nashville, Tennessee
- 1–14 January 10, 1964; Nashville, Tennessee (unissued)
- 1–15 January 11, 1964; Nashville, Tennessee
- 1–16 January 11, 1964; Nashville, Tennessee
- 1–17 January 11, 1964; Nashville, Tennessee
- 1–18 January 11, 1964; Nashville, Tennessee
- 1–19 January 11, 1964; Nashville, Tennessee
- 1–20 August 11, 1964; Nashville, Tennessee
- 1–21 August 11, 1964; Nashville, Tennessee
- 1–22 October 2, 1964; Nashville, Tennessee
- 1–23 October 2, 1964; Nashville, Tennessee
- 1–24 November 3, 1964; Nashville, Tennessee

CD-2: Recorded

- 2–1 November 3, 1964; Nashville, Tennessee
- 2–2 November 3, 1964; Nashville, Tennessee
- 2–3 November 3, 1964; Nashville, Tennessee
- 2–4 February 11, 1965; Nashville, Tennessee
- 2–5 February 11, 1965; Nashville, Tennessee
- 2–6 February 11, 1965; Nashville, Tennessee
- 2–7 April 15, 1965; Nashville, Tennessee
- 2–8 April 15, 1965; Nashville, Tennessee
- 2–9 April 15, 1965; Nashville, Tennessee
- 2–10 May 31, 1965; Nashville, Tennessee
- 2–11 August 10, 1965; Nashville, Tennessee
- 2–12 January 9, 1966; Nashville, Tennessee
- 2–13 January 9, 1966; Nashville, Tennessee
- 2–14 January 10, 1966; Nashville, Tennessee
- 2–15 March 8, 1966; Nashville, Tennessee
- 2–16 March 8, 1966; Nashville, Tennessee
- 2–17 August 5, 1966; Los Angeles, California
- 2–18 October 4, 1966; Nashville, Tennessee
- 2–19 January 23, 1967; Nashville, Tennessee
- 2–20 January 26, 1967; Nashville, Tennessee
- 2–21 February 16, 1967; Nashville, Tennessee
- 2–22 March 14, 1967; Nashville, Tennessee
- 2–23 March 14, 1967; Nashville, Tennessee
- 2-24 Unknown

CD-3: Recorded

- 3–1 August 30, 1967; Nashville, Tennessee
- 3–2 October 17, 1967; Nashville, Tennessee
- 3–3 January 24, 1968; Nashville, Tennessee
- 3–4 March 12, 1968; Nashville, Tennessee
- 3–5 September 20, 1968; Nashville, Tennessee
- 3-6 circa December 11–17, 1968; Nashville, Tennessee (unissued)
- 3–7 January 10, 1969; Nashville, Tennessee (unissued)
- 3–8 January 10, 1969; Nashville, Tennessee (unissued)
- 3–9 May 16, 1969; Nashville, Tennessee
- 3–10 May 16, 1969; Nashville, Tennessee
- 3–11 May 19, 1969; Nashville, Tennessee
- 3–12 May 22, 1969; Nashville, Tennessee
- 3–13 June 11, 1970; Nashville, Tennessee
- 3–14 June 11, 1970; Nashville, Tennessee
- 3–15 June 11, 1970; Nashville, Tennessee
- 3–16 June 12, 1970; Nashville, Tennessee
- 3–17 June 12, 1970; Nashville, Tennessee
- 3–18 November 10, 1972; Nashville, Tennessee
- 3–19 June 18, 1973; Nashville, Tennessee
- 3–20 November 1978; Reno, Nevada (Live at Harrah's, unissued)
- 3–21 November 24, 1981; Spicewood, Texas
- 3-22 1985; Nashville, Tennessee
- 3-23 1985; Nashville, Tennessee
- 3-24 Unknown
