= Words and Music (Roger Miller album) =

Studio album by Roger Miller
- Released: 1966
- Recorded: 1964–1965
- Genre: Country
- Label: Smash Records
- Producer: Jerry Kennedy

Roger Miller chronology
| The 3rd Time Around (1965) | Words and Music (1966) | Walkin' in the Sunshine (1967) |

Words and Music is the fourth studio album by American country music singer Roger Miller. It was released by the Smash Records label in 1966 (see 1966 in country music). The record reached #32 on the country album charts and #108 on the Billboard 200, marking a significant drop in the charts following his first three albums.

Four singles were released from the album including "Husbands and Wives," Miller's final Top 5 country hit. The song was later covered by Brooks & Dunn on their 1998 album If You See Her, and was a #1 country hit for the duo. The Top 20 hit, "I've Been a Long Time Leavin' (But I'll Be a Long Time Gone)" and the track "My Uncle Used to Love Me But She Died" were also released as singles, along with a cover of Elvis Presley's "Heartbreak Hotel."

Words also featured "Billy Bayou" and "Home," two songs which Miller had written earlier in his career for country singer Jim Reeves, who released the songs as singles in the late 1950s, charting at #1 and #2 respectively with "Billy Bayou" being the first #1 written by Miller in his career. Reeves later included the songs on his 1960 album He'll Have to Go.

== Background ==
After releasing material during the two-day session that brought forth his debut album, some of the tracks from The Return of Roger Miller and The 3rd Time Around, Miller's recordings from the session as well as others between 1964 and 1965 were included on this album. Miller wrote all of the songs on the album, with the exception of "Heartbreak Hotel." Curly Putman received songwriting credit along with Miller on the track "Dad Blame Anything a Man Can't Quit."

== Reception ==
Professional ratings
Review scores
| Source | Rating |
|---|---|
| Allmusic | 4/5 stars |

Allmusic gave the album four stars. It labeled the first track, "My Uncle Used to Love Me But She Died," as one of Miller's "weirdest song[s]", calling it "an attack of pure dementia". But the second track, "Husbands and Wives" was lauded for being "clever" and "saying so much with so few words". The song was also noted in the publication for setting the tone of the album. The necessity of the seventh track, "Heartbreak Hotel" was questioned by the reviewer, and cited as a precursor to Miller's "laziness" in his later recordings. However, Allmusic stated that Miller still built "the album to a strong climax purely through emotion and sentimentality".

== Track listing ==
All songs written by Roger Miller, except where indicated.

| No. | Title | Writer(s) | Length |
|---|---|---|---|
| 1. | "My Uncle Used to Love Me But She Died" | | 1:58 |
| 2. | "Husbands and Wives" | | 2:23 |
| 3. | "Every Which-A-Way" | | 2:05 |
| 4. | "Train of Life" | | 2:06 |
| 5. | "Billy Bayou" | | 1:58 |
| 6. | "Less and Less" | | 2:20 |
| 7. | "Heartbreak Hotel" | Mae Boren Axton, Tommy Durden, Elvis Presley | 2:10 |
| 8. | "Dad Blame Anything a Man Can't Quit" | Miller, Curly Putman | 2:04 |
| 9. | "I've Been a Long Time Leavin' (But I'll Be a Long Time Gone)" | | 2:14 |
| 10. | "Workin' Girl" |
| 11. | "You're My Kingdom" | | 2:12 |
| 12. | "Home" | | 1:50 |

== Chart ==
| Chart (1966) | Peak position |
|---|---|
| U.S. Top Country Albums | 32 |
| U.S. Billboard 200 | 108 |

=== Singles ===
| Year | Song | US Country | US | US AC | CAN | CAN AC |
|---|---|---|---|---|---|---|
| 1966 | "Husbands and Wives" | 5 | 26 | 2 | 14 | 10 |
| 1966 | "I've Been a Long Time Leavin'" (But I'll Be a Long Time Gone)" | 13 | 39 | - | - | - |
| 1966 | "My Uncle Used to Love Me But She Died" | 39 | 58 | - | 26 | - |
| 1966 | "Heartbreak Hotel" | 55 | 84 | - | - | - |

== Personnel ==
- Roger Miller - guitar, vocals
- Ray Edenton – guitar
- Buddy Harman – drums
- Bob Moore – bass
- Jerry Kennedy - guitar
- Thumbs Carllile - guitar
