= Great Hits of 1965 =

Studio album by Pat Boone
- Released: 1966
- Genre: Pop
- Label: Dot

Pat Boone chronology
Pat Boone Sings Winners of the Reader's Digest Poll (1965)	Great Hits of 1965 (1966)	Memories (1966)

Professional ratings
Review scores
Source	Rating
AllMusic	4/5 stars
Billboard	"Spotlight" pick

Great Hits of 1965 is the 32nd studio album by Pat Boone, released in 1966 on Dot Records.

== Track listing ==
Side one
No.	Title	Writer(s)	Length
1.	"Judith"	Shuman; Kaplan
2.	"I Will"	Dick Glasser
3.	"England Swings"	Roger Miller
4.	"Yesterday"	Lennon; McCartney
5.	"A Taste of Honey"	Scott; Marlow
6.	"Make the World Go Away"	Hank Cochran

Side two
No.	Title	Writer(s)	Length
1.	"Flowers on the Wall"	L. DeWitt
2.	"As Tears Go By"	Richards; Oldham; Jagger
3.	"King of the Road"	Roger Miller
4.	"One Has My Name (The Other Has My Heart)"	Eddie Dean; Dean; Blair
5.	"You've Lost That Lovin' Feelin'"	Spector; Mann; Weil
6.	"Spanish Eyes"	Kaempfert; Singleton; Snyder
