= List of RPM number-one country singles of 1998 =

These are the Canadian number-one country songs of 1998, per the RPM Country Tracks chart.

Issue date	Title	Artist	Source
January 12	Longneck Bottle	Garth Brooks	
January 19	Don't Be Stupid (You Know I Love You)	Shania Twain	
January 26	Longneck Bottle	Garth Brooks	
February 2	The Kind of Heart That Breaks	Chris Cummings	
February 9	Just to See You Smile	Tim McGraw	
February 16	Walk This Road	Bruce Guthro	
February 23	I Wanna Fall in Love	Lila McCann	
March 2	What If I Said	Anita Cochran with Steve Wariner	
March 9	Round About Way	George Strait	
March 16	She's Gonna Make It	Garth Brooks	
March 23	Nothin' but the Taillights	Clint Black	
March 30	Little Red Rodeo	Collin Raye	
April 6	Perfect Love	Trisha Yearwood	
April 13	You're Still the One	Shania Twain	
April 20	This Kiss	Faith Hill	
April 27	This Kiss	Faith Hill	
May 4	Bye, Bye	Jo Dee Messina	
May 11	Two Piña Coladas	Garth Brooks	
May 18	Two Piña Coladas	Garth Brooks	
May 25	Two Piña Coladas	Garth Brooks	
June 1	Out of My Bones	Randy Travis	
June 8	I'm from the Country	Tracy Byrd	
June 15	I Just Want to Dance with You	George Strait	
June 22	One of These Days	Tim McGraw	
June 29	The Shoes You're Wearing	Clint Black	
July 6	If You See Him/If You See Her	Reba McEntire with Brooks & Dunn	
July 13	If You See Him/If You See Her	Reba McEntire with Brooks & Dunn	
July 20	The Shoes You're Wearing	Clint Black	
July 27	The Shoes You're Wearing	Clint Black	
August 3	From This Moment On	Shania Twain with Bryan White	
August 10	From This Moment On	Shania Twain with Bryan White	
August 17	26 Cents	The Wilkinsons	
August 24	26 Cents	The Wilkinsons	
August 31	True	George Strait	
September 7	True	George Strait	
September 14	If You Ever Have Forever in Mind	Vince Gill	
September 21	I'm Alright	Jo Dee Messina	
September 28	How Long Gone	Brooks & Dunn	
October 5	Where the Green Grass Grows	Tim McGraw	
October 12	Where the Green Grass Grows	Tim McGraw	
October 19	Honey, I'm Home	Shania Twain	
October 26	Honey, I'm Home	Shania Twain	
November 2	You Move Me	Garth Brooks	
November 9	Honey, I'm Home	Shania Twain	
November 16	Honey, I'm Home	Shania Twain	
November 23	Wide Open Spaces	Dixie Chicks	
November 30	Wide Open Spaces	Dixie Chicks	
December 7	Let Me Let Go	Faith Hill	
December 14	You're Easy on the Eyes	Terri Clark	

== See also ==
- 1998 in music
- List of number-one country hits of 1998 (U.S.)
