= List of Hot Country Singles & Tracks number ones of 1998 =

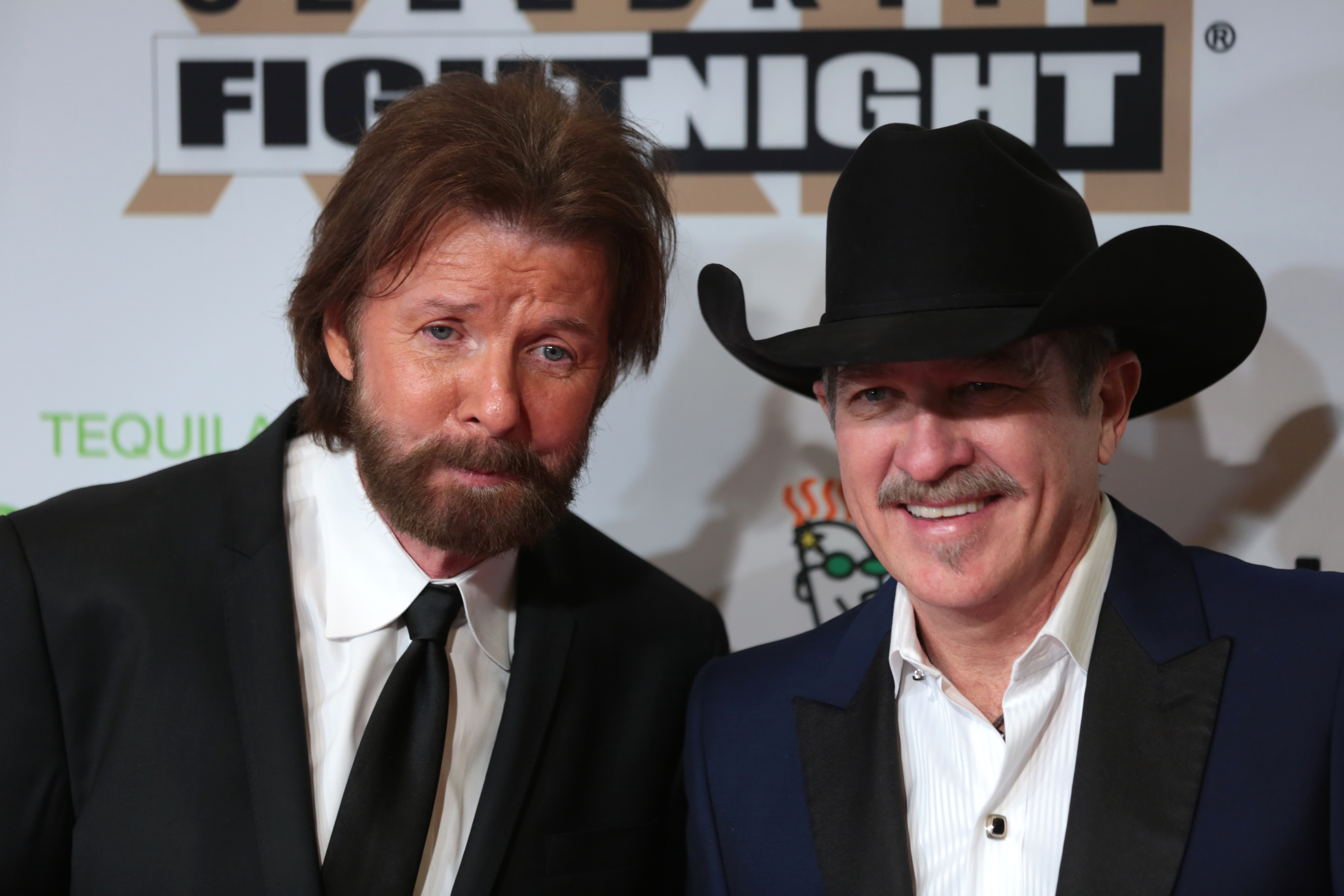
Brooks & Dunn had three number ones in 1998, one in collaboration with Reba McEntire.

Hot Country Songs is a chart that ranks the top-performing country music songs in the United States, published by Billboard magazine. In 1998, 26 different songs topped the chart, then published under the title Hot Country Singles & Tracks, in 52 issues of the magazine. Chart rankings were based on weekly airplay data from country music radio stations compiled by Nielsen Broadcast Data Systems.

At the start of the year, Garth Brooks was at number one with "Longneck Bottle", which had been in the top spot since the chart dated December 20, 1997. The song remained there for the first chart of 1998 before being replaced by "A Broken Wing" by Martina McBride. Brooks went on to have two further number ones in 1998, "Two Piña Coladas" and a cover version of Bob Dylan's "To Make You Feel My Love". Unrelated singer Kix Brooks and his musical partner Ronnie Dunn, collectively known as Brooks & Dunn, also had three number ones in 1998. The duo topped the listing with "How Long Gone", "Husbands and Wives" and "If You See Him/If You See Her", a collaboration with vocalist Reba McEntire. Other acts to reach number one with more than one song in 1998 were Clint Black, Faith Hill, Hill's husband Tim McGraw, Jo Dee Messina, George Strait, Shania Twain and Dixie Chicks, whose two chart-toppers came from Wide Open Spaces, their first album to feature new vocalist Natalie Maines.

Tim McGraw spent the most weeks at number one of any act, with ten. His song "Just to See You Smile" spent six weeks at the top, the most by one song, and was ranked number one on Billboard's year-end chart of the most popular country songs. The final number one of the year was "You're Easy on the Eyes" by Terri Clark, who was one of four acts, all of them female, to achieve their first number one in 1998; during the late 1990s, female performers achieved a level of success on the country charts greater than they had in the first half of the decade or would in the subsequent decade. The other first-time chart-toppers were Jo Dee Messina, who reached the top spot for the first time with "Bye, Bye"; Anita Cochran, who spent one week at the top with "What If I Said", a duet with Steve Wariner; and the all-female group Dixie Chicks, who first reached number one in August with "There's Your Trouble".

== Chart history ==
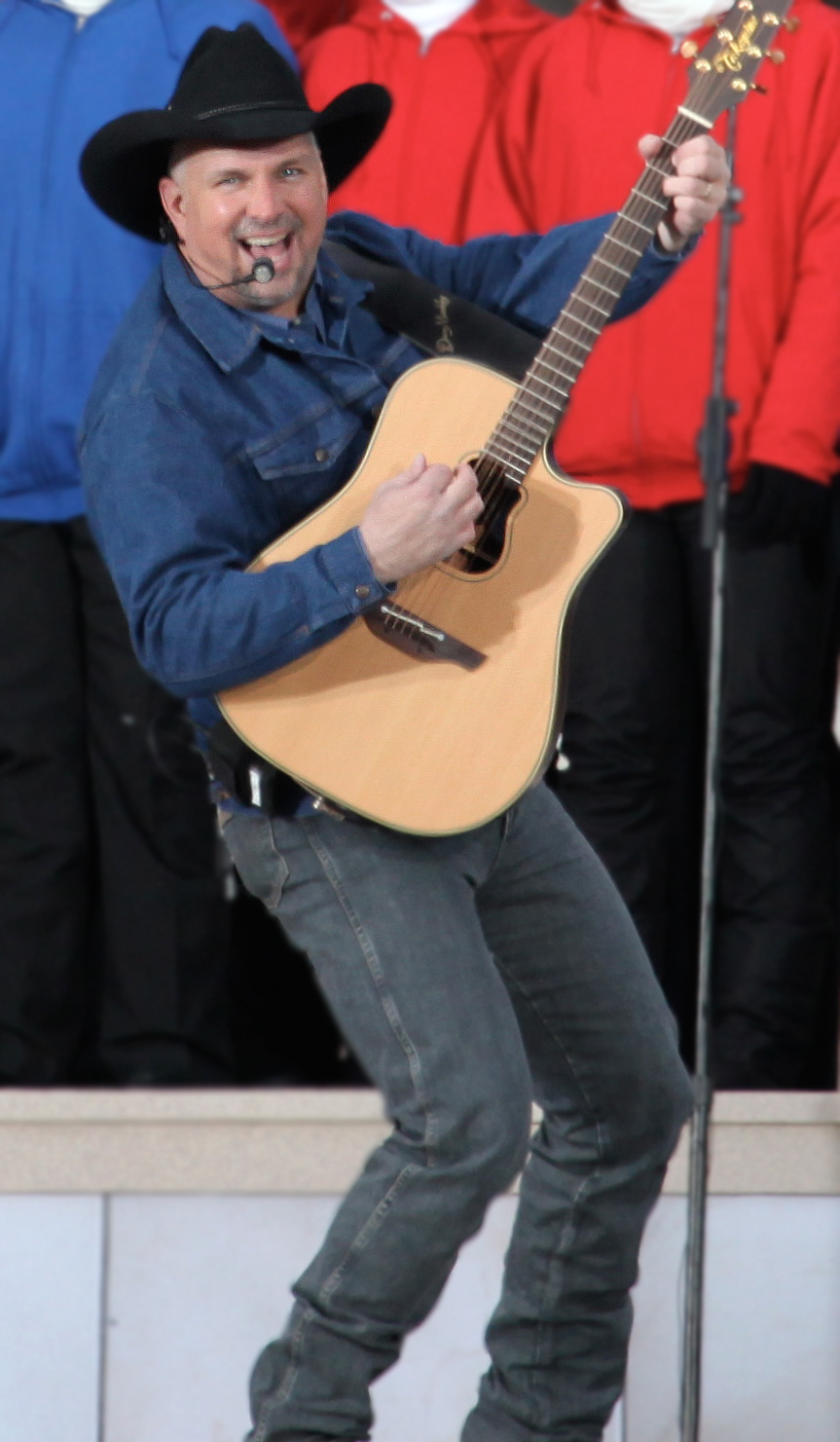
Garth Brooks was at number one at the start of the year and had two further number-one songs in 1998, although each spent only a single week in the top spot.

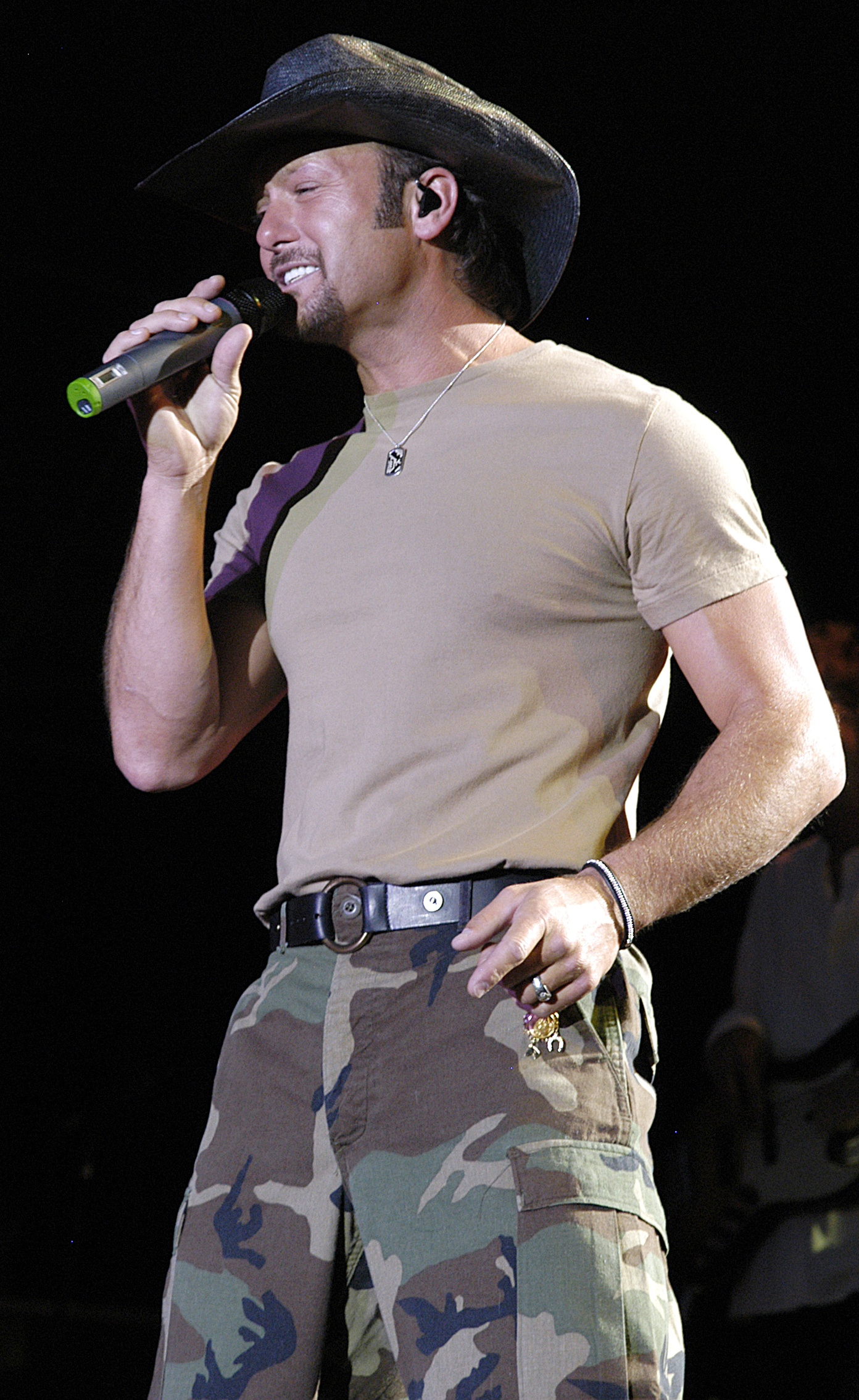
Tim McGraw spent a total of ten weeks at number one in 1998 with two songs.

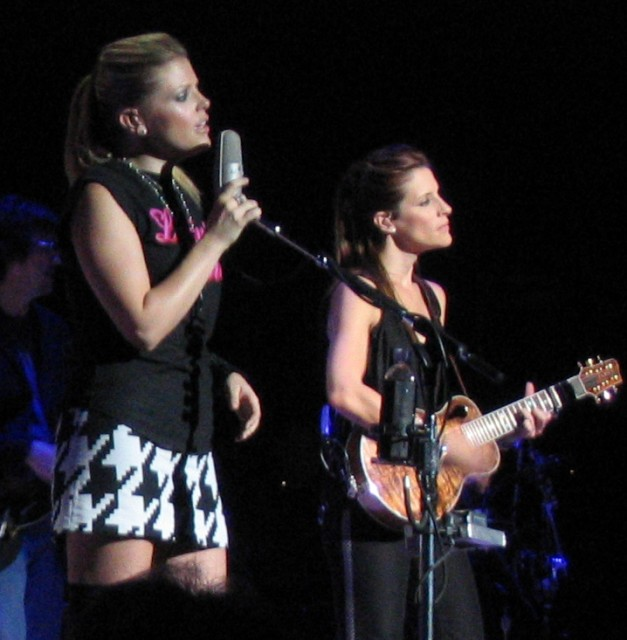
Dixie Chicks had two number ones in 1998. Both came from the group's first album to feature vocalist Natalie Maines (left).

Issue date	Title	Artist(s)	Ref.
January 3	"Longneck Bottle"	Garth Brooks	
January 10	"A Broken Wing"	Martina McBride	
January 17	"Just to See You Smile"	Tim McGraw	
January 24	"Just to See You Smile"	Tim McGraw	
January 31	"Just to See You Smile"	Tim McGraw	
February 7	"Just to See You Smile"	Tim McGraw	
February 14	"Just to See You Smile"	Tim McGraw	
February 21	"Just to See You Smile"	Tim McGraw	
February 28	"What If I Said"	Anita Cochran (duet with Steve Wariner)	
March 7	"Round About Way"	George Strait	
March 14	"Round About Way"	George Strait	
March 21	"Nothin' but the Taillights"	Clint Black	
March 28	"Nothin' but the Taillights"	Clint Black	
April 4	"Perfect Love"	Trisha Yearwood	
April 11	"Perfect Love"	Trisha Yearwood	
April 18	"Bye, Bye"	Jo Dee Messina	
April 25	"Bye, Bye"	Jo Dee Messina	
May 2	"You're Still the One"	Shania Twain	
May 9	"Two Piña Coladas"	Garth Brooks	
May 16	"This Kiss"	Faith Hill	
May 23	"This Kiss"	Faith Hill	
May 30	"This Kiss"	Faith Hill	
June 6	"I Just Want to Dance with You"	George Strait	
June 13	"I Just Want to Dance with You"	George Strait	
June 20	"I Just Want to Dance with You"	George Strait	
June 27	"If You See Him/If You See Her"	Reba McEntire/Brooks & Dunn	
July 4	"If You See Him/If You See Her"	Reba McEntire/Brooks & Dunn	
July 11	"The Shoes You're Wearing"	Clint Black	
July 18	"I Can Still Feel You"	Collin Raye	
July 25	"I Can Still Feel You"	Collin Raye	
August 1	"To Make You Feel My Love"	Garth Brooks	
August 8	"There's Your Trouble"	Dixie Chicks	
August 15	"There's Your Trouble"	Dixie Chicks	
August 22	"I'm Alright"	Jo Dee Messina	
August 29	"I'm Alright"	Jo Dee Messina	
September 5	"I'm Alright"	Jo Dee Messina	
September 12	"How Long Gone"	Brooks & Dunn	
September 19	"How Long Gone"	Brooks & Dunn	
September 26	"How Long Gone"	Brooks & Dunn	
October 3	"Where the Green Grass Grows"	Tim McGraw	
October 10	"Where the Green Grass Grows"	Tim McGraw	
October 17	"Where the Green Grass Grows"	Tim McGraw	
October 24	"Where the Green Grass Grows"	Tim McGraw	
October 31	"Honey, I'm Home"	Shania Twain	
November 7	"Wide Open Spaces"	Dixie Chicks	
November 14	"Wide Open Spaces"	Dixie Chicks	
November 21	"Wide Open Spaces"	Dixie Chicks	
November 28	"Wide Open Spaces"	Dixie Chicks	
December 5	"It Must Be Love"	Ty Herndon	
December 12	"Let Me Let Go"	Faith Hill	
December 19	"Husbands and Wives"	Brooks & Dunn	
December 26	"You're Easy on the Eyes"	Terri Clark	

== See also ==
- 1998 in music
- List of artists who reached number one on the U.S. country chart
