= You Can't Roller Skate in a Buffalo Herd =

Novelty song by Roger Miller

Single by Roger Miller

from the album The Return of Roger Miller
- B-side: "Train of Life"
- Released: 1966
- Genre: Country, novelty
- Length: 1:48
- Label: Smash
- Songwriter: Roger Miller
- Producer: Jerry Kennedy

Roger Miller singles chronology
"Husbands and Wives" (1966)	"You Can't Roller Skate in a Buffalo Herd" (1966)	"My Uncle Used to Love Me But She Died" (1966)

"You Can't Roller Skate in a Buffalo Herd" is a novelty song written and recorded by American singer‑songwriter Roger Miller. The lyrics list a series of improbable or impossible activities and end with a refrain that contrasts those impossibilities with a simple statement about being happy.

== Composition ==
The song is structured as a sequence of short, humorous lines that enumerate absurd actions rather than a conventional narrative, a form commentators identify as novelty songwriting. Writers and commentators have described the piece as an example of Roger Miller's wit and concise phrasing in his lighter material.

== Reception and legacy ==
Modern lists and retrospective articles frequently include "You Can't Roller Skate in a Buffalo Herd" when surveying Miller's novelty songs and when compiling examples of quirky country tracks that received attention on radio or in popular commentary. It was performed October 3, 1976 on The Muppet Show.

The recording appears on various compilations of Miller's mid‑1960s material, including King of the Road: The Genius of Roger Miller. The song is cited in pieces that honor Miller's career and in coverage of tributes to his work, including King of the Road: A Tribute to Roger Miller.

The song appears in the 2010 film Jackass 3D during a stunt where Johnny Knoxville, just as the song states to be impossible, faces a herd of buffalo on a pair of roller skates.
