= Kenneth Carllile =

American singer-songwriter

Thumbs Carllile
- Carllile in 1950

Background information
- Birth name: Kenneth Ray Carllile
- Also known as: Thumbs Carllile, Thumbs Carlisle
- Born: April 2, 1931 St. Louis, Missouri, U.S.
- Died: July 31, 1987 (aged 56) Decatur, Georgia, U.S.
- Genres: country music
- Occupation(s): guitarist, session musician
- Instrument: guitar
- Years active: 1941–1987
- Labels: Epic; Smash; Gemini (1974)

Kenneth Ray Carllile (April 2, 1931 – July 31, 1987), better known as Thumbs Carllile (Carlisle in some collections), was an American country music guitarist and songwriter known for his innovative zither-like fingerstyle playing, sitting with his guitar in his lap while fretting, picking, and strumming with his fingers and thumbs. He performed with Little Jimmy Dickens on the Grand Ole Opry in the early 1950s, and was a member of Roger Miller's band from 1964 to 1972.

== Biography ==
Kenneth Carllile was born April 2, 1931, in St. Louis, Missouri, and grew up on his impoverished father's tenant farm in Harrisburg, Illinois. At age eight, he began playing a Dobro resonator guitar won by his sister Evelyn, and after she hid the steel bar, Carllile began using his thumbs. When his father gave him a Silvertone guitar, his small thumb and fingers were too short to fit around the neck, so he played it on his lap like the Dobro.

=== Early career ===
In 1941, Carllile's family moved to Granite City, Illinois, and he later made his debut playing "Sweet Georgia Brown" at a Ferlin Husky concert at the Music Box Club in East St. Louis. He was expelled from high school at 16 for refusing to shave, and instead performed with Husky until he was discovered by Little Jimmy Dickens in 1949 during a St. Louis appearance. He joined Dickens' Country Boys after demonstrating he could play both parts of Dickens' twin guitar lines. Dickens gave him the nickname Thumbs, which Carllile never embraced. He played with the group until 1952, including performances on the Grand Ole Opry.

From 1952–54, Carllile served in the US Army, performing with its Special Services division. He was stationed in Stuttgart, Germany, where he met and married another servicemember, singer-songwriter Virginia Boyle, in 1955. After his discharge, Carllile regularly appeared on ABC-TV's Ozark Jubilee in Springfield, Missouri, from 1956 to 1957, both as a soloist and with Bill Wimberley's Country Rhythm Boys. They released Springfield Guitar Social on Starday in 1958. In the late 50s, Virginia and he performed in Billings, Montana, and appeared on KOOK-TV.

In 1961, Carllile met guitarist Les Paul, who was impressed by Carllile's skill and his wife's songwriting, and they recorded enough tracks for two albums at Paul's home studio in Mahwah, New Jersey. Later that year, Carllile (as Thumbs Carlyle) released a duet on Epic with his wife Virginia (as Ginny O'Boyle), "Indian Girl, Indian Boy".

=== With Roger Miller ===
In 1963, Carllile joined the Wade Ray Five, and Ray's Las Vegas band, but left the following year to join Roger Miller's band, where he stayed until 1972. He appeared on Miller's 1966 NBC-TV show, and performed with him five times on NBC's Tonight Show during the 1960s. He also appeared at the Grammy Awards when Miller swept the country categories in 1964 with "Dang Me" and in 1965 with "King of the Road", for which Carllile provided the song's signature finger snaps.

Miller helped him sign with Smash Records, where he released two albums, Roger Miller Presents Thumbs Carllile and All Thumbs in 1965. He released several singles for Smash, including "My Bossa Nova/Candy Girl" (1966). Several tracks he recorded for the label were popular, but did not chart, including "Let it Be Me", "Caravan", "No Yesterday", "Theme from Picnic", "Blue Skies", "Stranger on the Shore", and "Hold It". In 1968, Carllile signed with Capitol and recorded the album Walking in Guitar Land.

=== Later years ===
In 1986, he moved from Chattanooga, Tennessee, to Decatur, Georgia, where Virginia worked in a factory making springs. Carllile underwent surgery that year for colon cancer, which despite fundraisers, left the family bankrupt. After recovering, he played with his trio, the Indecent Three; performed on Sagebrush Boogie, a weekly program on Atlanta's WRFG-FM, and was a regular at such venues as the Freight Room in Decatur and the Point.

In late July 1987, Carllile suffered a mild heart attack while driving back to Decatur from Chattanooga with his newest release. He was preparing to perform as the regular opening act for guitarist Michael Hedges when he died on July 31. He was buried in Decatur Cemetery.

== Family ==
Carllile's two daughters are also musicians. Kathy Carllile is a blues singer in Atlanta, Georgia, who once led Kathy Carllile and Tabasco, and had a minor hit with "Stay Until the Rain Stops" in 1986 on the Frontline label. Carllile and she were once winners on The Gong Show. Tammy Carllile sang in the Cowboy Boogie Band in Las Vegas and won Nashville's Hall of Fame singing competition; she also sang vocals on albums with her father. Her two sons, Joseph Carllile and Daniel Guidry, are musicians and aspire to make a career of it.
