= A Trip in the Country =

Studio album by Roger Miller
- Released: 1970
- Genre: Country
- Length: 24:34
- Label: Mercury
- Producer: Jerry Kennedy

Roger Miller chronology
Roger Miller 1970 (1970)	A Trip in the Country (1970)	Dear Folks, Sorry I Haven't Written Lately (1973)

A Trip in the Country is the 11th album by American country music singer-songwriter Roger Miller. It reached No. 23 in the US Country Music chart. For the sleeve notes he wrote:

"Before the days of "Dang Me", "King of the Road" and such, I was a young, ambitious song-writer walking the streets of Nashville, trying to get anybody and everybody who would to record my songs. All in all, I wrote about 150 songs for Ray Price, George Jones, Ernest Tubb and others. Some were hits, and some were not. Here are a few of the better ones. In the beginning, I created heavenly, earthly songs."

One of the songs on the album, "Tall, Tall Trees," was later recorded by Alan Jackson. The Jackson version was released as a single and became a No. 1 hit on Billboard's Hot Country Singles & Tracks chart in 1995.

== Track listing ==
All songs written by Roger Miller, except where noted. Side 1

1. "Tall, Tall Trees" (Miller, George Jones) 2:12
2. "A World I Can’t Live In" 2:16
3. "Nothing Can Stop My Love" (Miller, Jones) 1:50
4. "When Two Worlds Collide" (Miller, Bill Anderson) 2:08
5. "My Ears Should Burn (When Fools are Talked About)" 2:06
6. "A World So Full of Love" 2:19

Side 2

1. "Don’t We All Have the Right" 1:56
2. "That’s the Way I Feel" (Miller, Jones) 1:49
3. "Half a Mind" 2:45
4. "When a House is Not a Home" 2:26
5. "Invitation to the Blues" 2:32

== Personnel ==
- Harold Bradley, Ray Edenton, Charlie McCoy, Chip Young - guitar
- Hargus "Pig" Robbins - piano
- Bob Moore - bass
- Buddy Harman - drums
- Buddy Emmons - steel guitar
- Tommy Jackson, Buddy Spicher - fiddle

== Production ==
- Producer: Jerry Kennedy
- Engineers: Tom Sparkman & Charlie Tallent
- Album Photos: Brian D. Hennssey
- Album Art Direction: Des Strobel
- Album Design: Wm. Falkenburg
