= Mandy Barnett =

American singer (born 1975)

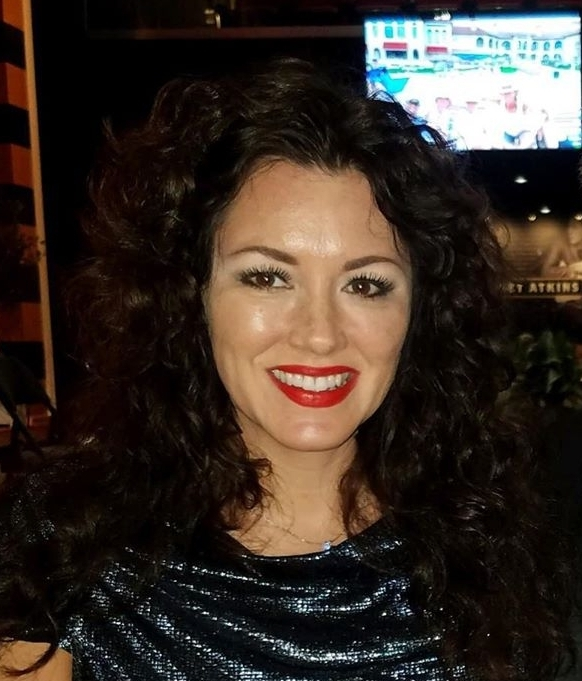
- Barnett in 2019

Background information
- Born: Amanda Carol Barnett; September 28, 1975 (age 50)
- Origin: Crossville, Tennessee, United States
- Genres: Country, Traditional Pop
- Occupation: Singer
- Instrument: Vocals
- Years active: 1994-present
- Labels: Capitol, Asylum
- Website: www.mandybarnett.com

Amanda Carol Barnett (born September 28, 1975) is an American country music singer.

== Early life and music career ==
Barnett has been singing since she was a child, performing at churches, local venues, as well as at Dollywood. In her musical career, she has released eight albums and charted three singles on the Billboard country charts. Her highest-charting country single is "Now That's All Right With Me", which reached No. 43 in 1996. Barnett has also held the titular role in the musical Always… Patsy Cline, a musical based on the life of Patsy Cline, which opened in 1994 at the Ryman Auditorium in Nashville. She has performed the role in nearly 500 performances over a 20-year period. In 2019, Rolling Stone Magazine named Barnett's recording of "The Whispering Wind" as one of the top songs of 1999, ranking it at 74 out of 99 songs. Barnett performs with bands and symphonies around the world, including the Nashville Symphony and Detroit Symphony Orchestra. On August 13, 2019, Barnett made her cabaret debut at Feinstein's/54 Below in New York City. Barnett, along with Garth Brooks, Emmylou Harris, Vince Gill and others performed at the 2019 Musicians Hall of Fame and Museum Concert and Induction Ceremony; among the inductees were producer Owen Bradley, Steve Wariner and Alabama. Barnett's rendition of the Skeeter Davis classic "The End of The World" was released as a single on October 18, 2019. The single was subsequently included on an album titled "A Nashville Songbook" released in August 2020. On September 28, 2020 The Tennessee Department of Tourist Development honored Barnett with the unveiling of a “Tennessee Music Pathways” marker at the historic downtown square in her Tennessee hometown of Crossville. Barnett released her eighth studio album on May 7, 2021 titled "Every Star Above", paying tribute to Billie Holiday's "Lady in Satin." It was the final album orchestrated by Sammy Nestico prior to his death. The album reached number one on the iTunes Jazz Charts one day after its release, and it was named one of the best albums of 2021 by Variety magazine. On September 28, 2021 Barnett was invited by Connie Smith to become an official member of the Grand Ole Opry, and was formally inducted by Smith and Marty Stuart on November 2, 2021. She has made over 500 appearances since 1994.

== Discography ==
=== Albums ===
Title	Details	Peak chart positions			
Title	Details	US Country	US Heat	US Indie	CAN Country
Mandy Barnett	Release date: February 27, 1996; Label: Asylum Records	60	—	—	28
I've Got a Right to Cry	Release date: April 13, 1999; Label: Sire Records	45	47	—	—
The Platinum Collection	Release date: June 26, 2006; Label: WEA; a compilation of Barnett's previous two albums minus "I'll Just Pretend" and "Don't Forget to Cry"	—	—	—	—
Winter Wonderland	Release date: September 20, 2010; Label: Rounder/Cracker Barrel	43	10	—	—
Sweet Dreams	Release date: May 24, 2011; Label: Opry Music	—	—	—	—
I Can't Stop Loving You: The Songs of Don Gibson	Release date: November 11, 2013; Label: Cracker Barrel	32	4	29	—
Strange Conversation	Release date: September 21, 2018; Label: Dame Productions	—	—	—	—
A Nashville Songbook	Release date: August 21, 2020; Label: Melody Place Music/BMG	—	—	—	—
Every Star Above	Release date: May 7, 2021; Label: Melody Place Music/BMG	—	—	—	—
"—" denotes releases that did not chart

=== Singles ===
Year	Single	Peak chart positions		Album
Year	Single	US Country	CAN Country	Album
1995	"An Unforgettable Voice"	—	—	—N/a
1996	"Now That's All Right with Me"	43	64	Mandy Barnett
1996	"Maybe"	65	93	Mandy Barnett
1996	"A Simple I Love You"	72	—	Mandy Barnett
1999	"I've Got a Right to Cry"	—	—	I've Got a Right to Cry
1999	"The Whispering Wind (Blows On By)"	—	—	I've Got a Right to Cry
2014	"Blue Blue Day" (featuring Alison Krauss)	—	—	I Can't Stop Loving You: The Songs of Don Gibson
2018	"More Lovin'"	—	—	Strange Conversation
2018	"It's Alright (You're Just In Love)"	—	—	Strange Conversation
2019	"The End of the World"	—	—	A Nashville Songbook
2019	"Help Me Make It Through the Night"	—	—	A Nashville Songbook
2020	"For All We Know"	—	—	Every Star Above
2020	"You Don't Know What Love Is"	—	—	Every Star Above
"—" denotes releases that did not chart

=== Guest singles ===
Year	Single	Artist	Peak positions	Album
Year	Single	Artist	US Country	Album
1996	"Hope"	Various Artists	57	single only

=== Guest appearances ===
Year	Title	Song
1997	AFTRA First Tuesday Singers Showcase	"When We Ran"
1997	Traveller (soundtrack)	"Dream Lover" "Searching (For Someone Like You)" "Dark Moon"
1999	A Walk on the Moon (soundtrack)	"A Town Without Pity"
1999	Election (soundtrack)	"If You'll Be the Teacher"
1999	Drop Dead Gorgeous (soundtrack)	"Beautiful Dreamer"
1999	All the Lonely (Songs by John Pennell)	"No One Knows"
2000	Space Cowboys (soundtrack)	"I Only Have Eyes for You"
2001	Good Rockin' Tonight (The Legacy of Sun Records)	"You Win Again"
2002	Caught in the Webb (A Tribute to Webb Pierce)	"Slowly"
2007	Crazy (soundtrack)	"Walking After Midnight" "I Fall to Pieces"
2018	King of the Road: A Tribute to Roger Miller	Lock, Stock and Teardrops

=== Recordings with other artists ===
Year	Artist	Title	Song(s)	Participation	Format(s)
1996	Various Artists	Hope - Country Music's Quest For A Cure	"Hope (All Star Version A)" "Hope (All Star Version B)"	Background Vocals	Cassette Single; 7" 45 RPM Vinyl Single; CD Single
1996	Kenny Chesney	Me and You	"Ain't That Love"	Background Vocals	Cassette Tape; CD
1997	Kim Richey	Bitter Sweet	"I'm Alright"	Background Vocals	Cassette Tape; CD
1997	Gail Davies	Greatest Hits	"Unwed Fathers"	Background Vocals	CD
1998	Don Walser	Down at the Sky-Vue Drive-In	"Are You Teasing Me?" "Hearts Made Of Stone"	Duets	CD
1998	Various Artists	The Songs of Dwight Yoakam - Will Sing For Food	"Near You"	Kim Richey sings Lead; Mandy sings Background Vocals	CD
2000	Ray Price	Prisoner of Love	Various Tracks	Background Vocals	CD
2000	Melvin Sloan and Friends	Pick and Sing Opry Favorites	"Waltz Across Texas"	Duet	CD
2001	Gail Davies and Friends	Live and Unplugged at the Station Inn	"Bucket To The South"	Background Vocals	CD
2001	Rosie Flores	Speed of Sound	"Rock-A-Bye Boogie"	Background Vocals	CD
2001	Asleep At The Wheel	The Very Best Of	"The Letter (That Johnny Walker Read)"	Duet	CD
2001	Jesse Dayton	Hey Nashvegas!	"Hey Nashvegas!" "Don't Take Yesterday"	Background Vocals	CD
2002	Various Artists	Dressed In Black - A Tribute To Johnny Cash	"Jackson"	Duet With Chuck Mead	CD
2006	SpongeBob SquarePants	The Best Day Ever	Various Tracks	Background Vocals	CD
2014	Ronnie Milsap	Summer Number Seventeen	"You Make Me Feel Brand New" "Make Up"	Duet Vocals	CD
2022	Michael Feinstein	Gershwin Country	"How Long Has This Been Going On?"	Duet Vocals	CD

=== Videos ===
Year	Title	Song(s)	Format(s)
2001; 2005	Opry Family Reunion - Volume Four (VHS); Country's Family Reunion at the Opry - Volume Four (DVD/VHS)	"Hurt" "Crazy"	See Title
2001; 2005	Opry Family Reunion - Volume Six (VHS); Country's Family Reunion at the Ryman - Volume Two (DVD/VHS)	"Legend in My Time"	See Title

=== Music videos ===
Year	Video	Director
1996	Now That's All Right with Me	Norman Jean Roy
1996	Maybe	Norman Jean Roy
1997	Planet of Love	David McClister
1999	The Whispering Wind (Blows on By)	David McClister
2010	This Time of the Year	David McClister
2021	I Love a Rainy Night	
