= The 3rd Time Around =

1965 Studio Album By Roger Miller

Studio album by Roger Miller
- Released: June 1965
- Recorded: 1964–1965
- Genre: Country
- Length: 26:09
- Label: Smash
- Producer: Jerry Kennedy

Roger Miller chronology
| The Return of Roger Miller (1965) | The 3rd Time Around (1965) | Words and Music (1966) |

Professional ratings
Review scores
| Source | Rating |
|---|---|
| Allmusic | 5/5 stars |

The 3rd Time Around is the third studio album by American country music singer Roger Miller. It was released under the Smash Records label in June 1965 (see 1965 in country music). The record reached #1 on the country album charts and #13 on the Billboard 200, his third highest ranking on the pop albums charts, and his only #1 country album.

Four singles were released from the album: "Engine Engine #9," "One Dyin' and a Buryin'", "Kansas City Star", and "The Last Word in Lonesome Is Me". The first three all peaked in the top 10 on the Country singles chart. "Engine, Engine #9" was also a top 10 crossover hit on the Billboard Hot 100 and Hot Adult Contemporary Tracks as was "Kansas City Star" on the latter chart. "The Last Word in Lonesome Is Me" did not fare as well. It was later recorded by Eddy Arnold, whose version was a #2 country hit in 1966, and by NFL quarterback Terry Bradshaw, whose version was also a hit on the country charts.

3rd Time was cited as a return to the "honky tonk roots" of Roger Miller.

== Background ==
After releasing material during the two-day session that brought forth his debut album, and some of the tracks from The Return of Roger Miller, another album from the extra cuts recorded at the session were compiled with a few other songs to produce The 3rd Time. Miller wrote all twelve of the songs on the album, with assistance from Buddy Killen on "I'll Pick Up My Heart (And Go Home)."

== Reception ==
Upon its release, Billboard designated The 3rd Time Around a "Spotlight Pick" and identified it as "another hot contender full of clever original compositions." Allmusic gave the album five stars, lauding it for the "extra effort" put in "to make it sound fresh and different." The publication observed that "at least half of the dozen titles here are among his most famous." The tracks "Swiss Maid," "Big Harlan Taylor", and "The Last Word in Lonesome Is Me" were cited as presenting a "range of themes and characters" consistent with Miller's "individualistic style." "Kansas City Star" was described as a "rockabilly-flavored classic."

== Track listing ==
All songs are written by Roger Miller, except "I'll Pick Up My Heart (And Go Home)," by Miller and Buddy Killen.

| No. | Title | Length |
|---|---|---|
| 1. | "Engine Engine #9" | 2:17 |
| 2. | "This Town" | 2:01 |
| 3. | "The Last Word in Lonesome Is Me" | 2:47 |
| 4. | "Water Dog" | 2:14 |
| 5. | "I'll Pick up My Heart (And Go Home)" | 2:15 |
| 6. | "Swiss Maid" | 2:03 |
| 7. | "It Happened Just That Way" | 1:50 |
| 8. | "The Good Old Days" | 2:12 |
| 9. | "One Dyin' and a Buryin'" | 2:02 |
| 10. | "Kansas City Star" | 2:16 |
| 11. | "Big Harlan Taylor" | 2:02 |
| 12. | "Swing Low Swingin' Chariot" | 2:10 |

== Chart positions ==
| Chart (1965) | Peak position |
|---|---|
| U.S. Top Country Albums | 1 |
| U.S. Billboard 200 | 13 |

=== Singles ===
| Year | Song | US Country | US | US AC | CAN | UK |
|---|---|---|---|---|---|---|
| 1965 | "Engine Engine #9" | 2 | 7 | 2 | 11 | 33 |
| 1965 | "One Dyin' and a Buryin'" | 10 | 34 | - | - | - |
| 1965 | "It Just Happened That Way" | - | 105 | - | - | - |
| 1965 | "Kansas City Star" | 7 | 31 | 3 | 9 | 48 |

== Personnel ==
- Roger Miller - guitar, vocals
- Ray Edenton – guitar
- Buddy Harman – drums
- Bob Moore – bass
