= If You See Her =

Studio album by Brooks & Dunn
- Released: June 2, 1998
- Genre: Country
- Length: 39:25
- Label: Arista Nashville
- Producer: Kix Brooks, Don Cook, Ronnie Dunn: "If You See Him/If You See Her" produced by Tony Brown and Tim DuBois

Brooks & Dunn chronology
The Greatest Hits Collection (1997)	If You See Her (1998)	Super Hits (1999)

Singles from If You See Her
- 1. "If You See Him/If You See Her" Released: April 27, 1998; 2. "How Long Gone" Released: June 24, 1998; 3. "Husbands and Wives" Released: September 28, 1998; 4. "I Can't Get Over You" Released: January 18, 1999; 5. "South of Santa Fe" Released: May 1999

Professional ratings
Review scores
Source	Rating
AllMusic	2.5/5 stars

If You See Her is the fifth studio album by American country music duo Brooks & Dunn, released in 1998 on Arista Nashville. The album featured five chart singles: "If You See Him/If You See Her", "How Long Gone", and "Husbands and Wives" (a cover of a Roger Miller song), all of which reached #1, plus "I Can't Get Over You" (which made #5) and "South of Santa Fe" (which stalled at #41). This last song was the first (and only) single of Brooks & Dunn's career to miss Top 40 entirely, and was the last single to feature Kix Brooks on lead vocals instead of Ronnie Dunn. The album is a counterpart to Reba McEntire's album If You See Him (released on the same day), which shared the track "If You See Him/If You See Her". A bonus limited edition EP was made available when consumers bought both If You See Him and If You See Her at the same time.

"Born and Raised in Black in White" is a cover of the Highwaymen (aka Waylon Jennings, Willie Nelson, Johnny Cash & Kris Kristofferson) song off their 1990 album, Highwayman 2. "Brand New Whiskey" was previously recorded by Gary Stewart (one of its writers) on his 1988 album Brand New.

== Track listing ==
No.	Title	Writer(s)	Length
1.	"How Long Gone"	Shawn Camp, John Scott Sherrill	3:40
2.	"I Can't Get Over You"	Ronnie Dunn, Terry McBride	4:08
3.	"South of Santa Fe"	Larry Boone, Paul Nelson, Kix Brooks	3:48
4.	"If You See Him/If You See Her" (with Reba McEntire)	McBride, Tommy Lee James, Jennifer Kimball	3:58
5.	"Brand New Whiskey"	Gary Stewart, Mary Lou Stewart	3:09
6.	"Born and Raised in Black and White"	Don Cook, John Barlow Jarvis	3:55
7.	"Your Love Don't Take a Backseat to Nothing"	McBride, Brooks, Dunn	3:28
8.	"Husbands and Wives"	Roger Miller	3:10
9.	"Way Gone"	Brooks, Bob DiPiero	3:11
10.	"When Love Dies"	Chuck Cannon, Kent Robbins	3:50
11.	"You're My Angel"	Greg Humphrey, Micheal Smotherman	3:12
Total length:			39:25

Exclusive Collector's Edition - Bonus EP
No.	Title	Writer(s)	Length
1.	"All of You" (Reba McEntire)	Anna Wilson, Rebecca Maples, Robert Ellis Orrall	3:25
2.	"Steady As She Goes" (Brooks & Dunn)	Don Cook, Kix Brooks, Ronnie Dunn	3:28
3.	"I'll Take Your Heart" (Reba McEntire)	Robert John "Mutt" Lange	4:33
4.	"What It's Come Down To" (Brooks & Dunn)	Lewis Anderson	4:03

== Charts ==
=== Weekly charts ===
Chart (1998)	Peak position
Canadian Albums (RPM)	42
Canadian Country Albums (RPM)	7
US Billboard 200	11
US Top Country Albums (Billboard)	4

=== Year-end charts ===
Chart (1998)	Position
US Billboard 200	115
US Top Country Albums (Billboard)	14

Chart (1999)	Position
US Top Country Albums (Billboard)	19

== Certifications ==
Region	Certification	Certified units/sales
Canada (Music Canada)	Gold	50,000^{^}
United States (RIAA)	2× Platinum	2,000,000^{^}
^{^} Shipments figures based on certification alone.

== Personnel ==
As listed in liner notes.

All tracks except "If You See Him/If You See Her"

- Bruce Bouton – pedal steel guitar, lap steel guitar
- Kix Brooks – lead vocals, background vocals
- Dennis Burnside – piano, keyboards, Hammond B-3 organ
- Mark Casstevens – acoustic guitar
- Ronnie Dunn – lead vocals, background vocals
- Shannon Forrest – drums
- Larry Franklin – fiddle, mandolin
- Steve Gibson – acoustic guitar
- Rob Hajacos – fiddle, "assorted hoedown tools"
- Wes Hightower – background vocals
- David Hungate – bass guitar, tic tac bass
- John Barlow Jarvis – piano, keyboards, Hammond B-3 organ
- Chris Leuzinger – electric guitar
- Liana Manis – background vocals
- Brent Mason – electric guitar, gut string guitar
- John Wesley Ryles – background vocals
- Dennis Wilson – background vocals
- Lonnie Wilson – drums, percussion
- Glenn Worf – bass guitar

The Nashville String Machine

- David Angell, David Davidson, Carl Gorodetzky, Lee Larrison, Pamela Sixfin, Alan Umstead, Catherine Umstead, Mary Kathryn Vanosdale – violins
- Gary Vanosdale, Kris Wilkinson – violas
- John Catchings, Bob Mason – cellos

"If You See Him/If You See Her"

- Bobby All – acoustic guitar
- Bruce C. Bouton – pedal steel guitar
- Larry Byrom – electric guitar
- Kix Brooks – background vocals
- Mark Casstevens – acoustic guitar
- Ronnie Dunn – lead vocals
- Rob Hajacos – fiddle
- John Barlow Jarvis – piano, electric piano
- Brent Mason – electric guitar
- Randy McCormick – synthesizer
- Reba McEntire – lead vocals
- Michael Rhodes – bass guitar
- John Wesley Ryles – background vocals
- Lonnie Wilson – drums
