= My Uncle Used to Love Me But She Died =

Single by Roger Miller

from the album Words and Music
- B-side: "You're My Kingdom"
- Released: September 1966
- Genre: Country
- Label: Smash Records
- Songwriter: Roger Miller
- Producer: Jerry Kennedy

Roger Miller singles chronology
"You Can't Rollerskate in a Buffalo Herd" (1966)	"My Uncle Used to Love Me But She Died" (1966)	"Heartbreak Hotel" (1966)

"My Uncle Used to Love Me But She Died" is a 1966 song by Roger Miller. It was the fourth of four singles released from Miller's fourth LP, Words and Music, all of which became U.S. Top 40 Country hits.

== Chart history ==
The song became a hit in the U.S. on both the Billboard Hot 100 (#58) and Country (#39) charts. On Cash Box it reached #45. The song was a bigger hit in Canada, where it peaked at number 26 on the Pop singles chart.

== Lyrical content ==
Miller was raised by his aunt and uncle. He later rewrote the song, changing the nonsensical but suggestive lyrics about an "uncle" to "mama" instead, as included on his 1973 album Dear Folks, Sorry I Haven't Written Lately.

== Chart performance ==
Chart (1966)	Peak position
Australia (Kent Music Report)	79
Canada RPM Top Singles	26
U.S. Billboard Hot 100	58
U.S. Billboard Country	39
U.S. Cash Box Top 100	45
