= I Can't Get Over You (Brooks & Dunn song) =

Single by Brooks & Dunn

from the album If You See Her
- B-side: "Way Gone"
- Released: January 18, 1999
- Genre: Country
- Length: 4:08
- Label: Arista Nashville 13152
- Songwriters: Ronnie Dunn; Terry McBride
- Producers: Kix Brooks; Don Cook; Ronnie Dunn

Brooks & Dunn singles chronology
"Husbands and Wives" (1998)	"I Can't Get Over You" (1999)	"South of Santa Fe" (1999)

"I Can't Get Over You" is a song written by Ronnie Dunn and Terry McBride, and recorded by American country music duo Brooks & Dunn. It was released in January 1999 as the fourth single from their album If You See Her, and it reached a peak of number 5 on the Hot Country Singles & Tracks chart, and number 51 on the Billboard Hot 100.

== Chart positions ==
"I Can't Get Over You" debuted at number 49 on the U.S. Billboard Hot Country Singles & Tracks chart for the week of January 16, 1999.

Chart (1999)	Peak position
Canada Country Singles (RPM)	2
US Billboard Hot 100	51
US Hot Country Songs (Billboard)	5

=== Year-end charts ===
Chart (1999)	Position
Canada Country Tracks (RPM)	31
US Country Songs (Billboard)	42
