= Judith (Pat Boone song) =

"Judith" is a 1966 song written by Sol Kaplan and Earl Shuman, known in the instrumental version as "Judith (Love Theme From Judith)" for the 1966 film of the same title starring Sophia Loren. It was a best selling single for Pat Boone, with lyrics beginning "Judith, you are the twilight..". Other versions were recorded by Ferrante and Teicher 1966, The Golden Voices, Hugo Montenegro and his orchestra, Jimmy Sedlar and orchestra.
