= How Long Gone =

Single by Brooks & Dunn

from the album If You See Her
- Released: June 24, 1998
- Genre: Country
- Length: 3:40
- Label: Arista Nashville 3128
- Songwriters: Shawn Camp; John Scott Sherrill
- Producers: Kix Brooks; Don Cook; Ronnie Dunn

Brooks & Dunn singles chronology
"If You See Him/If You See Her" (1998)	"How Long Gone" (1998)	"Husbands and Wives" (1998)

"How Long Gone" is a song written by Shawn Camp and John Scott Sherrill and recorded by American country music duo Brooks & Dunn. It was released in June 1998 as the second single from their 1998 album If You See Her. The song reached number one on the US Billboard Hot Country Singles & Tracks (now Hot Country Songs) chart in September 1998.

== Music video ==
The music video was directed by Steven Goldmann. The video starts out with a woman running out of the house, then we see the duo playing while spinning around the house, and showing everything turning into rot, and clocks with their hands turning quickly. At the end, the duo fades away into dust particles, and the house appears to have rotted out, and the pages on the calendar that was flipping throughout the video are all gone.

== Cover versions ==
Country music singer Jason Aldean covered the song from The Last Rodeo Tour.

== Chart positions ==
"How Long Gone" debuted at number 70 on the U.S. Billboard Hot Country Singles & Tracks for the week of June 29, 1998.

Chart (1998)	Peak position
Canada Country Singles (RPM)	1
US Hot Country Songs (Billboard)	1

=== Year-end charts ===
Chart (1998)	Position
Canada Country Tracks (RPM)	37
US Country Songs (Billboard)	13
