= Roger and Out =

Studio album by Roger Miller
- Released: May 1964
- Recorded: January 11, 1964
- Studio: Columbia Recording Studio, 804 16th Ave. South, Nashville, TN
- Genre: Country
- Length: 23:42
- Label: Smash
- Producer: Jerry Kennedy

Roger Miller chronology
Roger and Out (1964)	The Return of Roger Miller (1965)

Singles from Roger and Out
- 1. "Dang Me" Released: May 1964; 2. "Chug-a-Lug" Released: August 1964

Roger and Out is the debut studio album of country music artist Roger Miller, which was released under the Smash Records label in 1964. The second release did not chart but the first reached #3 on country album charts and #37 on the Billboard 200, and was ultimately certified as Gold by the RIAA.

Two singles were released from the album including "Chug-a-Lug" and "Dang Me." Both peaked in the top 10 on the Country, Billboard Hot 100, and Canadian charts, with the latter handing Miller the first #1 hit of his recording career.

The album took only two days to record, and did not include all material cut from the session, however Roger and Out was the first release of material from this period.

Soon after the initial release, the album was reissued as "Dang Me" with modified cover art.

== Reception ==
Professional ratings
Review scores
Source	Rating
Allmusic	link

Critics were astonished at how well the first single had done, considering its differences with the British Invasion material dominating radio at the time. Allmusic reviewed the album long after its release, and gave it 4 stars, citing the "unique" and "rich" talent of Miller, displayed on the album. "Chug-a-Lug" and "Dang Me" were mentioned as "classics" and the track "Got 2 Again," was described as "catchy." Although the reviewer stated that the "playing" on the album was "top notch" and "the concept original," the record's shortness was criticized and compared to trying to drive to "Nashville on half a tank of gas."

== Track listing ==
All tracks are written by Roger Miller

No.	Title	Length
1.	"Chug-a-Lug"	2:04
2.	"The Moon Is High (And So Am I)"	1:56
3.	"Private John Q."	1:45
4.	"Lou's Got the Flu"	1:42
5.	"It Takes All Kinds to Make a World"	2:37
6.	"Feel of Me"	1:59
7.	"Dang Me"	1:47
8.	"Got 2 Again"	2:17
9.	"I Ain’t Comin’ Home Tonight"	2:00
10.	"That’s Why I Love You Like I Do"	2:05
11.	"Squares Make the World Go Round"	1:33
12.	"If You Want Me To"	1:57

== Chart positions ==
Chart (1964)	Peak position
U.S. Top Country Albums	3
U.S. Billboard 200	37

=== Singles ===
Year	Song	US Country	US	CAN
1964	"Dang Me"	1	7	6
1964	"Chug-a-Lug"	3	9	23

== Personnel ==
- Roger Miller - guitar, vocals
- Ray Edenton - guitar
- Buddy Harman - drums
- Bob Moore - bass
