= The Return of Roger Miller =

Studio album by Roger Miller
- Released: 1965
- Recorded: 1964–65
- Genre: Country
- Length: 26:18
- Label: Smash
- Producer: Jerry Kennedy

Roger Miller chronology
Roger and Out (1964)	The Return of Roger Miller (1965)	The 3rd Time Around (1965)

Singles from The Return of Roger Miller
- 1. "Do-Wacka-Do" Released: November 1964; 2. "King of the Road" Released: January 1965

The Return of Roger Miller is the second studio album by country music singer-songwriter Roger Miller. It was released under the Smash Records label in 1965. It reached No. 2 on the country album charts and No. 4 on the Billboard 200, and was ultimately certified as Gold by the RIAA.

Two singles were released from the album, "Do-Wacka-Do" and "King of the Road." The latter was the biggest crossover hit of Miller's career reaching the top of the country, adult contemporary, and English singles charts, and peaking in the top ten in the Billboard 100 and Canadian singles charts. The track "You Can't Roller Skate in a Buffalo Herd" was later released as a single in 1966. "In the Summertime" was a renamed and re-recorded version of Miller's 1960 single "You Don't Want My Love."

== Background ==
After releasing material during the two-day session that brought forth his debut album, record producer Jerry Kennedy began work with Miller to create another album from the other material recorded at the session. The tracks for The Return were compiled and a few songs recorded at a different session were also added. Smash proceeded to release the album following the positive reception to Roger and Out, which won Miller five Grammys, and handed him the first No. 1 of his career with "Dang Me."

On the album, sounds to go along with Miller's scat harmonizing during lulls in the vocals and for background music were built around the lead guitar played by Miller. Few instruments were used in the production, but a doubling of acoustic and electric guitars were used frequently on the album. Piano play was also essential for setting the tone and keeping a rhythm on the tracks.

== Reception ==
Professional ratings
Review scores
Source	Rating
Allmusic	5/5 stars
Record Mirror	3/5 stars

Critics gave the album positive reviews, remarking that "King of the Road" was "perhaps the most perfect country song ever written" and that "it is packed with detail and nuance like a Vincent van Gogh painting." By itself, the track won five Grammy awards for Miller including best Rock and roll single. By comparison, the whole album won only one, for best country album.

"Do-Wacka-Do" was lauded in a Beachwood Reporter review as the "finest example of Miller's outrageous, ultra-high scat singing" as was "You Can't Roller Skate In a Buffalo Herd," which the reviewer labeled as "wacky." Overall the publication stated that the record was "nothing but one strong song after another."

Allmusic gave the album five stars, commenting that the tracks "are classic American songs which hold up alongside the best of any generation." Although the review mentioned the album's shortness, the reviewer stated that Miller got "it all in" regardless, "balancing the humorous and serious songs, stretching out just a touch on the more swinging numbers." The publication also praised the instrumentals of the album, deeming the "arrangements" responsible for making each of the recordings "special."

== Track listing ==
All songs written by Roger Miller, except where noted.

No.	Title	Writer(s)	Length
1.	"Do-Wacka-Do"		1:45
2.	"Atta Boy Girl"		1:54
3.	"Reincarnation"		1:58
4.	"That's the Way It's Always Been"	Miller, George Jones	1:33
5.	"As Long as There's a Shadow"		2:03
6.	"Hard Headed Me"		2:32
7.	"Ain't That Fine"	Dorsey Burnette	2:31
8.	"King of the Road"		2:28
9.	"You Can't Roller Skate in a Buffalo Herd"		1:48
10.	"Our Hearts Will Play the Music"		1:59
11.	"Love Is Not for Me"		2:11
12.	"In the Summertime"		1:44
13.	"There I Go Dreamin'"		1:53

== Chart history ==
Chart (1965)	Peak position
U.S. Top Country Albums	2
U.S. Billboard 200	4

=== Singles ===
Year	Song	US Country	US	US AC	CAN	UK
1965	"Do-Wacka-Do"	15	31	-	38	-
1965	"King of the Road"	1	4	1	10	1

== Personnel ==
- Roger Miller - guitar, vocals
- Buddy Harman – drums
- Buddy Killen – guitar
- Bob Moore – bass
