= Engine Engine Number 9 =

1965 single by Roger Miller

"Engine Engine #9"
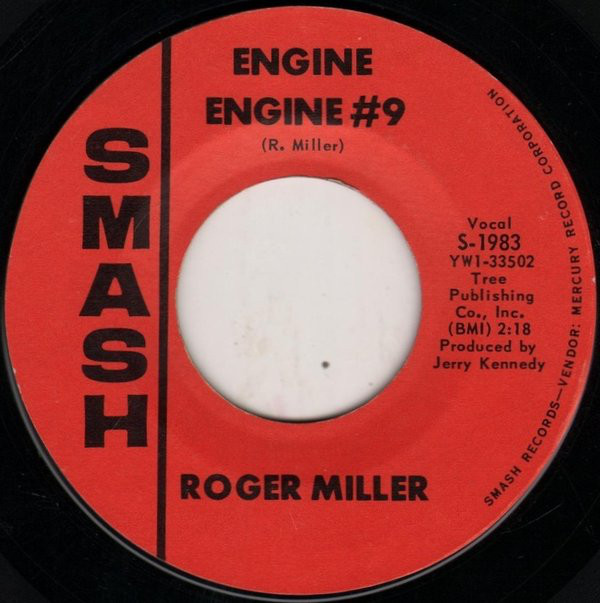

Single by Roger Miller

from the album The 3rd Time Around
- B-side: "The Last Word in Lonesome is Me"
- Released: May 1965
- Recorded: April 15, 1965
- Genre: Country
- Length: 2:18
- Label: Smash
- Songwriter: Roger Miller
- Producer: Jerry Kennedy

Roger Miller singles chronology
"King of the Road" (1965)	"Engine Engine #9" (1965)	"One Dyin' and a Buryin'" (1965)

"Engine Engine #9" is a song written and recorded by American country music artist Roger Miller. It was released in May 1965 as the lead single from the album, The 3rd Time Around. The song peaked at number 2 on the U.S. country singles chart.

The story in the song concerns a man waiting for his girlfriend to arrive by train, fearing that she may have found another man during the trip.

The song title is a reference to the children's rhyme of the same name, similarly quoted in rap duo Black Sheep's song "The Choice Is Yours (Revisited)", an extended version of another song, "The Choice Is Yours".

== Chart performance ==
Chart (1965)	Peak position
U.S. Billboard Hot Country Singles	2
U.S. Billboard Hot 100	7
U.S. Billboard Adult Contemporary	2
Canadian RPM Top Singles	11
UK Singles Chart	33
