= If You See Him/If You See Her =

Single by Reba McEntire and Brooks & Dunn

from the album If You See Him (Reba McEntire album) and If You See Her (Brooks & Dunn album)
- Released: April 27, 1998
- Genre: Country
- Length: 3:59
- Label: MCA Nashville/Arista Nashville
- Songwriters: Tommy Lee James; Jennifer Kimball; Terry McBride
- Producers: Tony Brown; Tim DuBois

Reba McEntire singles chronology
"What If?" (1997)	"If You See Him/If You See Her" (1998)	"Forever Love" (1998)

Brooks & Dunn singles chronology
"He's Got You" (1997)	"If You See Him/If You See Her" (1998)	"How Long Gone" (1998)

"If You See Him/If You See Her" is a song written by Terry McBride, Jennifer Kimball and Tommy Lee James, and recorded by American country music artist Reba McEntire, along with the duo Brooks & Dunn. It served as the title track to each artist's respective 1998 albums (If You See Him for Reba, and If You See Her for Brooks & Dunn), both released on June 2 of that year. The song was concurrently promoted and distributed by both artists' labels: MCA Nashville and Arista Nashville, then the respective labels for McEntire and Brooks & Dunn.

== Content ==
It is a ballad, alternating McEntire's vocals with those of Ronnie Dunn (one half of the duo), while Kix Brooks (the other half) provides harmony vocals on the verses sung by Dunn. McEntire and Brooks & Dunn debuted the song at the Academy of Country Music awards in 1998.

The song reached number one on the Billboard Hot Country Singles & Tracks (now Hot Country Songs) charts for the week of June 27, 1998, and held that position for two weeks, giving McEntire her twenty-ninth number one single, and Brooks & Dunn their twelfth.

On the Brooks & Dunn: The Last Rodeo special (on CBS) May 23, 2010, Lady Antebellum sang this song with Reba McEntire and Brooks & Dunn coming in towards the end.

== Music video ==
The video starts off with Reba at a bar ending a meal with ladies. Then, Kix Brooks comes to the bar. Then, Reba sings in an empty fancy theatre, along with Ronnie Dunn. A piano on the stage is seen in the background, and Kix is seen playing the piano. Before the end of the video, Kix and Ronnie are talking to each other as Kix is going to his truck. After Ronnie leaves, Kix goes into his SUV. Then, his phone rings, and talks with Reba for a little bit. After they hang up, Kix drives away.

== Chart performance ==
"If You See Him/If You See Her" debuted at number 32 on the U.S. Billboard Hot Country Songs chart for the week of May 2, 1998. It peaked at number 1 and it stayed in the position for two consecutive weeks.

== Charts ==
Chart (1998)	Peak position
Canada Country Singles (RPM)	1
US Hot Country Songs (Billboard)	1

=== Year-end charts ===
Chart (1998)	Position
Canada Country Tracks (RPM)	14
US Country Songs (Billboard)	31

== Certifications ==
Region	Certification	Certified units/sales
United States (RIAA)	Gold	500,000^{‡}
^{‡} Sales+streaming figures based on certification alone.
