= Chug-a-Lug (Roger Miller song) =

Single by Roger Miller

from the album Roger and Out
- B-side: "Reincarnation"
- Released: August 1964
- Recorded: January 11, 1964
- Genre: Country
- Length: 2:04
- Label: Mercury
- Songwriter: Roger Miller
- Producer: Jerry Kennedy

Roger Miller singles chronology
"Dang Me" (1964)	"Chug-a-Lug" (1964)	"Do-Wacka-Do" (1964)

"Chug-a-Lug" is a song written and recorded by American country music artist Roger Miller. The song reached number 9 on the US Billboard Hot 100 in 1964, becoming his second pop hit.

== Content ==
The song is a humorous reminiscence of youthful encounters with homemade alcoholic beverages. The expression "chug-a-lug" refers to quickly downing a drink, and the lyrics describe the singer's reaction to the extra-strong liquor. Example: "I swallered it with a smile / (sound of swallowing) / I run ten mile! Chug-a-lug, chug-a-lug / Makes you want to holler, 'Hi-dee-ho!' / Burns your tummy, don't ya know / Chug-a-lug, chug-a-lug."

== History ==
By July 1964, Roger Miller's hit "Dang Me" had run its course in radio. Concerned about offending their core country audience, Miller and his producer Jerry Kennedy had initially resisted releasing "Chug-a-Lug" as a single, and an alternate version of the song was produced with the word "wine" edited out. But head of Smash Records Charles Fach believed that the song's subject matter would lend to its success. Of the song’s success, Kennedy said: "Charles was the one who wanted 'Chug-a-Lug’, we didn't know he was testing this thing in places. He said, “The college crowd is eating up this ‘Chug-a-Lug’”. And I said, “Well, we've got our country fans to consider here.” And fortunately they loved it too."

Miller said that the song was based on a true story of a friend of his who "could drink a beer in 3 seconds".

== Chart performance ==
Chart (1964)	Peak position
Canadian RPM Country Tracks	3
New Zealand (Lever)	8
U.S. Billboard Hot Country Singles	3
U.S. Billboard Hot 100	9

== Cover versions ==
- The British group The Swinging Blue Jeans included the song on their 1966 Canada Capitol album Don't Make Me Over.
- In 1992, Mojo Nixon, backed up by Jeremy Tepper's band World Famous Blue Jays, released a version as the B-side of Mojo's original song "UFOs, Big Rigs & BBQ" on a purple vinyl 7" single released by Tepper's label Diesel Only Records.
- The song was recorded on the Kentucky Headhunters' 2005 album Big Boss Man.
- This song was re-worded and used for the theme of the Hey Hey It's Saturday segment Plucka Duck.
- Country singer Toby Keith included a live version on the deluxe edition of his 2010 album Bullets in the Gun.
- A reworded version was used in animated advertisements for "Milk Chug" single-serving milk bottles.
