= England Swings =

Single by Roger Miller

from the album Golden Hits
- B-side: "Good Old Days"
- Released: November 1965
- Recorded: August 10, 1965
- Genre: Country
- Label: Smash Records
- Songwriter: Roger Miller
- Producer: Jerry Kennedy

Roger Miller singles chronology
"Kansas City Star" (1965)	"England Swings" (1965)	"Husbands and Wives" (1966)

Official audio
- "England Swings" (re-recorded) on YouTube

"England Swings" is a 1965 country music song written and performed by American singer-songwriter Roger Miller. The single was Miller's eleventh hit on the US country chart where it peaked at number three. On the Billboard Hot 100, it peaked at number eight and was Miller's second number one on the Easy Listening chart. Petula Clark (from the Colour My World album) and Pat Boone both released cover versions in 1967.

The title refers to Swinging London, a popular term for the youth-centric cultural scene in London at the time, as in the opening line of the refrain: "England Swings, like a pendulum do". The lyrics, however, mostly relate to traditional notions of Britain, with references to "bobbies on bicycles", Westminster Abbey and Big Ben, plus, the "Rosy-red cheeks of the little children". The song also provides the structure for Miller's later song "Oo De Lally (Robin Hood and Little John)" for the film Robin Hood. The song is featured in the 2012 BBC documentary How The Brits Rocked America. Miller sang his own harmony and performed his own harmonic whistling on the song.

The song was used as the theme for 15 Storeys High, a 2002-04 British sitcom created and co-written by Sean Lock.

== Cover versions and renditions ==
Pat Boone covered it on his 1966 studio album Great Hits of 1965. The song was covered by The Wiggles and Keith Urban on the Australian version of the album Let's Eat, released in 2010. New Zealand country music artist Maria Dallas also covered the song in 1966.

== Chart history ==
Chart (1965–66)	Peak position
Australia	23
Canada CHUM Chart	9
New Zealand	4
UK Singles Chart	13
U.S. Billboard Hot Country Singles	3
U.S. Billboard Hot 100	8
U.S. Billboard Hot Adult Contemporary Tracks	1

== See also ==
- List of number-one adult contemporary singles of 1966 (U.S.)
