= Do-Wacka-Do =

"(And You Had a) Do-Wacka-Do"

Single by Roger Miller

from the album The Return of Roger Miller
- B-side: "Love Is Not for Me"
- Released: 1964
- Recorded: October 2, 1964
- Genre: Country
- Length: 1:45
- Label: Mercury
- Songwriter: Roger Miller
- Producer: Jerry Kennedy

Roger Miller singles chronology
"Chug-a-Lug" (1964)	"(And You Had a) Do-Wacka-Do" (1964)	"King of the Road" (1965)

"(And You Had a) Do-Wacka-Do" is a song by American country artist Roger Miller, released in 1964. The expression "do-wacka-do" is possibly a funny way of saying "do-like-I-do". Recorded in October 1964, the song was a lesser hit but it was one of Miller's most enduring lyric inventions.

== Background ==
The song expresses envy in a humorous way. The lyrics are written like a letter to a friend or possibly a former friend ("I hear tell you're doing well, good things have come to you ...") with whom the singer would like to trade places ("I wish I had your good luck charm, and you had a do-wacka-do, wacka-do, wacka-do, wacka-do, wacka-do").

== Chart performance ==
Chart (1965)	Peak position
U.S. Billboard Hot Country Singles	15
U.S. Billboard Hot 100	31
Canadian RPM Top Singles	38
