= Husbands and Wives (song) =

1966 song by Roger Miller

Single by Roger Miller

from the album Words and Music
- B-side: "I've Been a Long Time Leavin' (But I'll Be a Long Time Gone)"
- Released: February 1966
- Recorded: January 9, 1966
- Genre: Country
- Length: 2:23
- Label: Smash
- Songwriter: Roger Miller
- Producer: Jerry Kennedy

Roger Miller singles chronology
"England Swings" (1966)	"Husbands and Wives" (1966)	"You Can't Rollerskate in a Buffalo Herd" (1966)

"Husbands and Wives" is a song written and first recorded by American country music singer Roger Miller. Miller's original, from his album Words and Music, was released in February 1966 and was a crossover hit for him, reaching Top Ten on the U.S. country and Adult Contemporary charts, as well as Top 40 on the pop charts. Since the release of Miller's original, the song has been covered by several other artists, including The Everly Brothers, Ringo Starr, Neil Diamond, a duet between David Frizzell and Shelly West, Jules Shear, and Brooks & Dunn, whose version was a number-one country hit in 1998.

== Content ==
"Husbands and Wives" is a mid-tempo waltz in the key of C major. In it, the narrator makes observations on a couple who is breaking up ("Two broken hearts, lonely, looking like houses / Where nobody lives"). He then suggests that the relationship is strained because those involved have too much pride in themselves ("It's my belief pride is the chief cause in the decline / In the number of husbands and wives").

== Roger Miller version ==
Roger Miller recorded the song in 1966 for his album Words and Music, releasing it as the album's first single. It was a crossover hit for him, reaching Top 5 on the country and Adult Contemporary charts, as well as Top 40 on the Billboard Hot 100. Its b-side, "I've Been a Long Time Leavin' (But I'll Be a Long Time Gone)," peaked at #13 on the country charts.

== Wayne Newton cover ==
Wayne Newton recorded "Husbands and Wives" in 1968. It was a minor hit for him, reaching #28 on the U.S. Adult Contemporary chart, as well as #97 on Cash Box.

=== Chart history ===
Peter Lotis

Chart (1964)	Peak position
South Africa (Springbok)	1

Roger Miller

Chart (1966)	Peak position
Canadian RPM Top Singles	14
Canadian RPM Adult Contemporary	10
US Hot Country Songs (Billboard)	5
US Billboard Hot 100	26
US Adult Contemporary (Billboard)	2
New Zealand (Listener)	17

Wayne Newton

Chart (1968–1969)	Peak position
US Adult Contemporary (Billboard)	28
U.S. Cash Box Top 100	97

== David Frizzell and Shelly West version ==
"Husbands and Wives"

Single by David Frizzell and Shelly West

from the album Carryin' On the Family Names
- B-side: Yours for the Asking"
- Released: October 1981
- Genre: Country
- Length: 2:39
- Label: Warner Bros. Nashville
- Songwriter: Roger Miller
- Producers: Snuff Garrett, Steve Dorff

David Frizzell and Shelly West singles chronology
"A Texas State of Mind" (1981)	"Husbands and Wives" (1981)	"Another Honky-Tonk Night on Broadway" (1982)

David Frizzell and Shelly West covered the song on their 1981 duets album Carryin' On the Family Names, and released it as the album's third and final single. Their version reached the Top 20 on the country singles chart.

=== Chart history ===
Chart (1981)	Peak position
U.S. Billboard Hot Country Singles	16
Canadian RPM Country Tracks	38

== Brooks & Dunn version ==
"Husbands and Wives"

Single by Brooks & Dunn

from the album If You See Her
- B-side: "How Long Gone"
- Released: September 28, 1998
- Genre: Country
- Length: 3:10
- Label: Arista Nashville
- Songwriter: Roger Miller
- Producers: Don Cook, Kix Brooks, Ronnie Dunn

Brooks & Dunn singles chronology
"How Long Gone" (1998)	"Husbands and Wives" (1998)	"I Can't Get Over You" (1999)

Country music duo Brooks & Dunn covered the song on their 1998 album If You See Her. Featuring lead vocals from Ronnie Dunn, their version was the album's third single, reaching the top of the country singles chart in December 1998. It was also their first Top 40 hit on the pop charts, peaking at No. 36 on the Billboard Hot 100.

=== Chart history ===
"Husbands and Wives" debuted at number 64 on the U.S. Billboard Hot Country Singles & Tracks chart for the week of September 26, 1998.

Chart (1998–1999)	Peak position
Canada Country Singles (RPM)	2
US Billboard Hot 100	36
US Hot Country Songs (Billboard)	1

=== Year-end charts ===
Chart (1999)	Position
US Country Songs (Billboard)	75
