= King of the Road (song) =

1964 song by Roger Miller

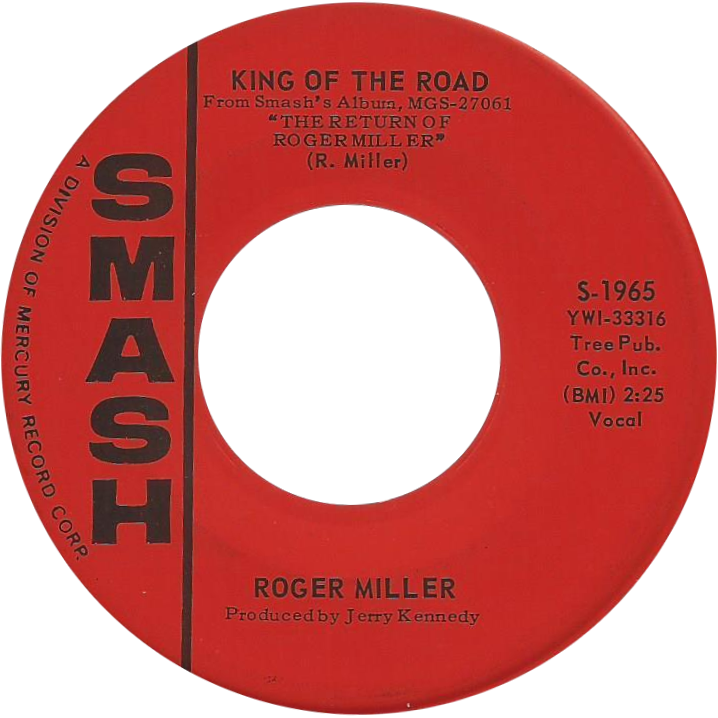
- One of A-side labels of the US release

Single by Roger Miller

from the album The Return of Roger Miller
- B-side: "Atta Boy Girl"
- Released: January 1965
- Recorded: November 3, 1964
- Genre: Country
- Length: 2:28
- Label: Smash
- Songwriter: Roger Miller
- Producer: Jerry Kennedy

Roger Miller singles chronology
"Do-Wacka-Do" (1965)	"King of the Road" (1965)	"Engine Engine #9" (1965)

Official audio
- "King of the Road" on YouTube

"King of the Road" is a song written by country singer Roger Miller, who first recorded it in November 1964. The lyrics tell of the day-to-day life of a traveling hobo, who despite having little money (a "man of means by no means"), revels in his freedom, describing himself humorously and cynically as the "king of the road". It was Miller's fifth single for Smash Records. The song won Miller 5 Grammy Awards in 1966.

== History ==
The crossover record reached number one on the Billboard US Country chart, number four on the Billboard Hot 100, and number one on the Easy Listening surveys. It was also number one in the UK Singles Chart and in Norway. Miller recalled that the song was inspired when he was driving and saw a sign on the side of a barn that read, "Trailers for sale or rent". This became the opening line of the song.

In June 1966, Richard Pryor performed the song on the premiere episode of Kraft Summer Music Hall.

A comic version by English entertainer Billy Howard, "King of the Cops", reached number six on the UK Singles Chart.

In 1987, R.E.M. covered the song and included it on their Dead Letter Office compilation album. Guitarist Peter Buck later commented, "If there was any justice in the world, Roger Miller should be able to sue for what we did to this song."

"King of the Road" won Roger Miller five Grammy Awards at the 1966 8th Annual Grammy Awards Ceremony. It won for Best Contemporary (R&R) Single, Best Contemporary (R&R) Vocal Performance - Male, Best Country and Western Single, Best Country and Western Vocal Performance - Male & Best Country and Western Song. He also won a Grammy for Best Country and Western Album The Return of Roger Miller.

== Critical reception ==
In 2024, Rolling Stone ranked the song at number 60 on its 200 Greatest Country Songs of All Time list. In June 2026, CBS News included the song in its list of the 250 essential American songs of the past 250 years.

== Personnel ==
Credits:

- Roger Miller – vocals
- Buddy Killen – guitar
- Thumbs Carllile – finger snaps
- Bob Moore – double bass
- unknown – piano, drums, tambourine

== Charts ==
=== Roger Miller ===
Chart (1965)	Peak position
UK Singles Chart	1
Norwegian Singles Chart	1
U.S. Billboard Hot Country Singles	1
U.S. Billboard Easy Listening	1
U.S. Billboard Hot 100	4
Irish Singles Chart	5
Canadian RPM Top Singles	10
Dutch Top40	14
Dutch Official Chart	5
German Official Chart	26
French TEF/TMP	6

=== The Proclaimers ===
Chart (1990)	Peak position
Australian Singles Chart	78
Luxembourg (Radio Luxembourg)	6
Irish Singles Chart	8
UK Singles Chart	9

=== Randy Travis ===
Chart (1997)	Peak position
Canada Country Singles (RPM)	74
US Hot Country Songs (Billboard)	51

== Certifications ==
Region	Certification	Certified units/sales
United Kingdom (BPI) Roger Miller version	Silver	200,000^{‡}
^{‡} Sales+streaming figures based on certification alone.

== "Queen of the House" ==
Country music singer Jody Miller (no relation) answered "King of the Road" with "Queen of the House" (1965). The song used Roger Miller's music while changing the lyrics to describe the day-to-day life of a stay-at-home mom. The words were written by Mary Taylor. The song was a hit, reaching number 12 on Billboard's Hot 100 and number five on the Hot Country Singles chart. It also won a Grammy for Female Country Vocal Performance.
