= Dang Me =

1964 single by Roger Miller

Single by Roger Miller

from the album Roger and Out
- B-side: "Got 2 Again"
- Released: May 1964
- Recorded: January 11, 1964
- Studio: Bradley Studios, Nashville, Tennessee
- Genre: Country
- Length: 1:47
- Label: Smash
- Songwriter: Roger Miller
- Producer: Jerry Kennedy

Roger Miller singles chronology
"Lock, Stock and Teardrops" (1963)	"Dang Me" (1964)	"Chug-a-Lug" (1964)

"Dang Me" is a song by American country music artist Roger Miller, and 1964's Grammy Award winner for Best Country & Western Song. It was Miller's first chart-topping country hit and first Top Ten pop music hit, whose "jazzy instrumental section" helped make it "the quintessential example of Miller's lighthearted humor, which brought him many more hits."

In 1998, Roger Miller's 1964 version of "Dang Me" was inducted into the Grammy Hall of Fame.

== History ==
Newly signed with the Mercury Records subsidiary Smash Records, Miller gathered on January 10–11, 1964, with music producer Jerry Kennedy, music arranger Bill Justis, and session musicians Ray Edenton and Harold Bradley (guitars), Hargus "Pig" Robbins (piano), Bob Moore (bass), and Buddy Harman (drums) at the Bradley Studios on Nashville, Tennessee's Music Row. On the second day, they recorded a run-through of "Dang Me," with Miller giving rehearsal direction (such as "one more time" at the end of the first chorus). The run-through was the final version released to radio. Miller, in his official biography, recalled writing the song in four minutes in a Phoenix, Arizona, hotel room. Johnny Cash in his last major interview claimed Miller wrote the song at Joshua Tree in California when Miller got out of the car with pen and paper to go write the song. Cash asked Miller what he was doing to which Miller replied "I'm writing a song. You can't come look."

Kennedy had already started work on many other of that session's songs before he eventually brought the recording of "Dang Me" to his home. Upon playing it, he recalled, "My kids came screaming down the stairs when 'Dang Me' came on. They thought that was the greatest thing they'd ever heard. I started playing it over and over and over again...". Kennedy and Mercury Records chose "Dang Me" as the first single of the May 1964 LP Roger and Out. The album was shortly retitled and rereleased that year as Dang Me (Smash SRS-67049)

The song spent 25 weeks on the Billboard country-music chart, reaching number one, and peaked at number seven on the magazine's pop chart. It went on to appear on numerous Miller compilations. On film or tape, Miller performs it, with other songs, in the 1966 concert film The Big T.N.T. Show, and as part of a closing-number medley on season three, episode #21, of The Muppet Show in 1979.

== Cover versions ==
"Dang Me" has appeared on recordings by at least eight other performers as disparate as Buck Owens, Johnny Rivers recorded live in 1964 on Here We à Go Go Again!, Sammy Davis Jr. on the live album That's All (1967), and Sweet G.A. Brown on his Miller Time album in 2011. The Hollies, with Graham Nash in the band, performed it live on tour in 1968. Singer-songwriter Buddy Miller (no relation to Roger Miller) covered it on his album "Majestic Silver Strings" in 2011. Widespread Panic covered the tune as en encore during their acoustic tour on February 11, 2012. Jerry Jeff Walker in 2001 for his Album “Gonzo Stew”

== Chart performance ==
Chart (1964)	Peak position
U.S. Billboard Hot Country Singles	1
U.S. Billboard Hot 100	7
Canadian RPM Country Tracks	3
Canadian RPM Top Singles	6
