= Roger Miller =

American country musician (1936–1992)

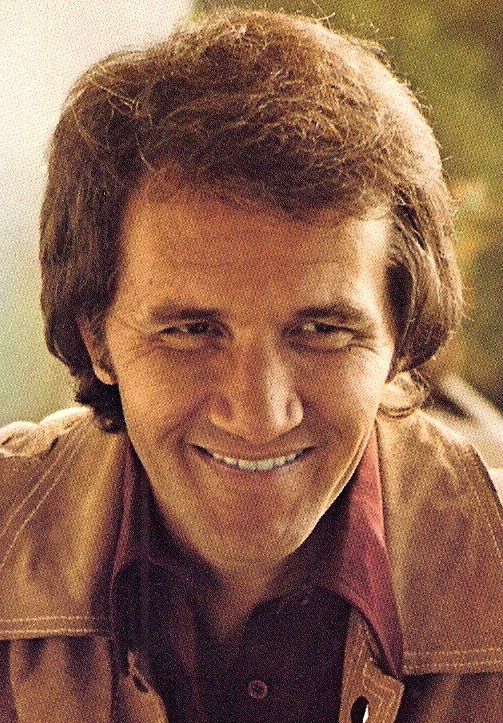
- Miller in 1975
- Born: Roger Dean Miller; January 2, 1936; Fort Worth, Texas, U.S.
- Died: October 25, 1992 (aged 56); Los Angeles, California, U.S.
- Other names: Roger Miller Sr. Roger D. Miller Sr. The Wild Child
- Occupations: Singer, songwriter, musician, actor
- Years active: 1957–1992
- Spouses: Barbara Crow (m. 1953; div. 1964) Leah Kendrick (m. 1964; div. 1976) Mary Arnold (m. 1977)
- Children: 8, including Dean
- Musical career
- Genres: Country, novelty, comedy
- Instruments: Vocals, guitar, fiddle, drums
- Website: rogermiller.com

Roger Dean Miller Sr. (January 2, 1936 – October 25, 1992) was an American singer-songwriter, widely known for his honky-tonk-influenced novelty songs and his chart-topping country hits "King of the Road", "Dang Me", and "England Swings".

After growing up in Oklahoma and serving in the U.S. Army, Miller began his musical career as a songwriter in the late 1950s, writing such hits as "Billy Bayou" and "Home" for Jim Reeves and "Invitation to the Blues" for Ray Price. He later began a recording career and reached the peak of his fame in the mid-1960s, continuing to record and tour into the 1990s, charting his final top-20 country hit "Old Friends" with Price and Willie Nelson in 1982. He also wrote and performed several of the songs for the 1973 Disney animated film Robin Hood. Later in his life, he wrote the music and lyrics for the 1985 Tony Award−winning Broadway musical Big River, in which he played Pap Finn in 1986.

Miller died from lung cancer in 1992, and was inducted into the Country Music Hall of Fame three years later. He was also inducted into the Oklahoma Music Hall of Fame in 2005. His songs continued to be recorded by other singers, with covers of "Tall, Tall Trees" by Alan Jackson and "Husbands and Wives" by Brooks and Dunn; both reached the number-one spot on country charts in the 1990s. The Roger Miller Museum — now closed — in his home town of Erick, Oklahoma, was a tribute to Miller.

== Early life ==
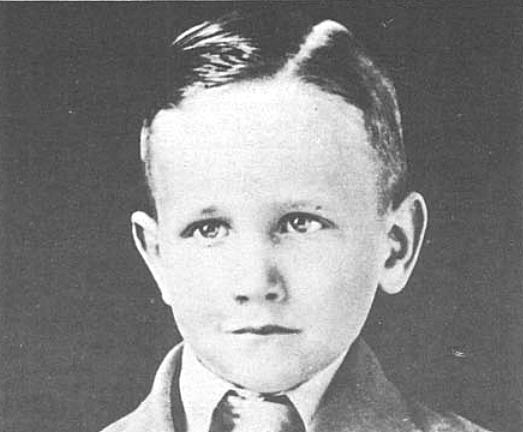
Miller at age four

Roger Miller was born in Fort Worth, Texas, the third son of Jean and Laudene (Holt) Miller. Jean Miller died from spinal meningitis when Miller was a year old. Unable to support the family during the Great Depression, Laudene sent her three sons to live with three of Jean's brothers; Miller grew up on a farm outside Erick, Oklahoma, with Elmer and Armelia Miller.

As a boy, Miller did farm work, such as picking cotton and plowing. He later said he was "dirt poor" and that as late as 1951, the family did not own a telephone. He received his primary education at a one-room schoolhouse. Miller was an introverted child who often daydreamed or composed songs. One of his earliest compositions went: "There's a picture on the wall. It's the dearest of them all, Mother."

Miller was a member of the FFA in high school. He listened to the Grand Ole Opry and Light Crust Doughboys on a Fort Worth station with his cousin's husband, Sheb Wooley. Wooley taught Miller his first guitar chords and bought him a fiddle. Wooley, Hank Williams, and Bob Wills were the influences that led to Miller's desire to be a singer-songwriter. He began to run away and perform in Oklahoma and Texas. At 17, he stole a guitar out of desperation to write songs, but he turned himself in the next day. He chose to enlist in the U.S. Army to avoid jail. He later quipped, "My education was Korea, Clash of '52." Near the end of his military service, while stationed in Atlanta, Georgia, Miller played fiddle in the "Circle A Wranglers", a military musical group started by Faron Young. While Miller was stationed in South Carolina, an army sergeant whose brother was Kenneth C. "Jethro" Burns, from the musical duo Homer and Jethro, persuaded him to head to Nashville after his discharge.

== Career ==
=== Nashville songwriter ===
On leaving the Army, Miller traveled to Nashville to begin his musical career. He met with Chet Atkins, who asked to hear him sing, lending him a guitar, since Miller did not own one. Out of nervousness, Miller played the guitar and sang a song in two different keys. Atkins advised him to come back later, when he had more experience. Miller found work as a bellhop at Nashville's Andrew Jackson Hotel, and he was soon known as the "singing bellhop". He was finally hired by Minnie Pearl to play the fiddle in her band. He then met George Jones, who introduced him to music executives from the Starday Records label, who scheduled an audition. Impressed, the executives set up a recording session with Jones in Houston. Jones and Miller collaborated to write "Tall, Tall Trees" and "Happy Child."

The human mind is a wonderful thing. It starts working before you're even born and doesn't stop again until you sit down to write a song.

— Roger Miller

After marrying and becoming a father, Miller put aside his music career to be a fireman in Amarillo, Texas. A fireman by day, he performed at night. Miller said that as a fireman, he saw only two fires, one in a "chicken coop" and another he "slept through", after which the department "suggested that...[he] seek other employment." Miller met Ray Price and became a member of his Cherokee Cowboys. He returned to Nashville and wrote "Invitation to the Blues", which was covered by Rex Allen and later by Ray Price, whose recording was a number-three hit on country charts. Miller then signed with Tree Publishing on a salary of $50 a week. He wrote: "Half a Mind" for Ernest Tubb, "That's the Way I Feel" for Faron Young, and his first number one, "Billy Bayou", which along with "Home" was recorded by Jim Reeves. Miller became one of the biggest songwriters of the 1950s. Bill Anderson later remarked, "Roger was the most talented, and least disciplined, person that you could imagine", citing the attempts of Miller's Tree Publishing boss, Buddy Killen to force him to finish a piece. He was known to give away lines, inciting many Nashville songwriters to follow him around since, according to Killen, "everything he said was a potential song."

=== Recording career ===
Miller signed a recording deal with Decca Records in 1958. He was paired with singer Donny Lytle, who later gained fame under the name Johnny Paycheck, to perform the Miller-written "A Man Like Me", and later "The Wrong Kind of Girl". Neither of these honky-tonk-style songs charted. His second single with the label, featuring the B-side "Jason Fleming", foreshadowed Miller's future style. To make money, Miller went on tour with Faron Young's band as a drummer, although he had never drummed. During this period, he signed a record deal with Chet Atkins at RCA Victor, for whom Miller recorded "You Don't Want My Love" (also known as "In the Summertime") in 1960, which marked his first appearance on country charts, peaking at number 14. The next year, he made an even bigger impact, breaking through the top 10 with his single "When Two Worlds Collide", cowritten with Bill Anderson. Miller soon tired of writing songs, divorced his wife, and began a party lifestyle that earned him the moniker "wild child". He was dropped from his record label and began to pursue other interests.

After numerous appearances on late-night comedy shows, Miller decided that he might have a chance in Hollywood as an actor. Short of money, he signed with the up-and-coming label Smash Records, asked the label for $1,600 in cash in exchange for recording 16 sides. Smash agreed to the proposal, and Miller performed his first session for the company early in 1964, when he recorded the hits "Dang Me" and "Chug-a-Lug". Both were released as singles, peaking at numbers one and three on country charts; both fared well on the Billboard Hot 100 reaching numbers seven and 9. The songs transformed Miller's career, although "Dang Me" was written by Miller in just four minutes. Later that year, he recorded the number-15 hit "Do-Wacka-Do", and soon after, the biggest hit of his career, "King of the Road", which topped Country and Adult Contemporary charts while peaking at number four on the Billboard 100. It also reached number one in the UK Singles Chart for one week in May 1965. The song was inspired by a sign in Chicago that read "Trailers for Sale or Rent" and a hobo who happened upon Miller at an airport in Boise, but Miller needed months to write the song, which was certified gold in May 1965 after selling a million copies. It won numerous awards and earned a royalty check of $160,000 that summer.

Later in 1965, Miller scored hits with "Engine Engine No. 9", "Kansas City Star" (a Top 10 country hit about a local television children's show personality who would rather stay in the safety and security of his success in Kansas City than become a bigger star – or risk failure – in Omaha), and "England Swings" (an adult contemporary number one). He began 1966 with the hit "Husbands and Wives," a mid-tempo waltz reflecting on issues that affect marriages."

Miller was given his own TV show on NBC in September 1966. It lasted for 13 weeks, and ended its run in January 1967. During this period, Miller recorded songs written by other songwriters. The final hit of his own composition was "Walkin in the Sunshine", which reached number seven on the country and number six on the adult contemporary charts in 1967. Later in the year, he scored his final top-10 hit with the first recording of Bobby Russell's "Little Green Apples". The next year, he was first to cover Kris Kristofferson's "Me and Bobby McGee," taking the song to number 12 on country charts. In 1970, Miller recorded the album A Trip in the Country, honky-tonk-style standards penned by Miller, including "Tall, Tall Trees". Later that year, after Smash Records folded, Miller was signed by Columbia Records, for whom he released Dear Folks: Sorry I Haven't Written Lately in 1973. Later that year, Miller wrote and performed three songs in the Walt Disney animated feature Robin Hood as the rooster and minstrel Allan-a-Dale: "Oo-De-Lally", "Not in Nottingham", and "Whistle-Stop" (which was sampled for use in the popular Hampster Dance web site). He provided the voice of Speiltoe, the equine narrator of the Rankin/Bass holiday special Nestor the Long-Eared Christmas Donkey in 1977. Miller collaborated with Willie Nelson on an album titled Old Friends. The title track was based on a song he had previously penned for his family in Oklahoma. The song, with guest vocals from Ray Price, was the last hit of Miller's career, peaking at number 19 on country charts in 1982.

=== Late career ===
In 1970, Miller opened the King of the Road Inn, a Nashville hotel. As Brian Carpenter wrote in Southern Cultures, "With its rooftop lounge and accompanying penthouse suite (complete with a swinging double bed), Miller's King of the Road Inn was, for a time, the unofficial center of Nashville's thriving music scene." It is now called the Holiday Inn Downtown Nashville-Stadium.

Miller continued to record for different record labels and charted a few songs, but stopped writing in 1978, feeling that his more "artistic" works were not appreciated. He was absent from the entertainment business following the release of Old Friends in 1981, but returned after receiving an offer to write a Broadway score for a musical based upon Mark Twain's Adventures of Huckleberry Finn. Although he had not read the novel, Miller accepted the offer after discovering how the story brought him back to his childhood in rural Oklahoma. Miller took a year and a half to write the opening, but he eventually finished it. The work, titled Big River, premiered at the Eugene O'Neill Theatre in New York City on April 25, 1985. The musical received glowing reviews, earning seven Tony Awards, including "Best Score" for Miller. He acted the part of Huck Finn's father Pap for three months after the exit of actor John Goodman, who left for Hollywood. In 1983, Miller played a dramatic role on an episode of Quincy, M.E. He played a country and western singer who is severely burned while freebasing cocaine.

Miller left for Santa Fe to live with his family following the success of Big River. He co-wrote Dwight Yoakam's hit "It Only Hurts When I Cry" from his 1990 album If There Was a Way, and supplied background vocals. The song was released as a single in 1991, peaking at number seven on country charts. He began a solo guitar tour in 1990, ending the following year after being diagnosed with lung cancer. His last performance on television occurred on a special tribute to Minnie Pearl, which aired on TNN on October 26, 1992, the day after Miller's death.

== Style ==
Although he is usually grouped with country music singers, Miller's unique style defies easy classification. Many of his recordings were humorous novelty songs with whimsical lyrics, coupled with scat singing or vocalese riffs filled with nonsense syllables. Others were sincere ballads that caught the public's fancy, like his signature song, "King of the Road". The biographical book Ain't Got No Cigarettes described Miller as an "uncategorizable talent" and stated that many regarded him as a genius.

Miller's whimsical lyrics and nonsense-sounding style led to him writing and performing songs for children's films such as "Oo-de-Lally" for the Disney animated film Robin Hood. During his most successful years as a songwriter and singer, Miller's music was placed in the country genre due to his somewhat country- or folk-sounding voice and the use of an acoustic guitar. AllMusic wrote that in blending country with jazz, blues, and pop, Miller "utilized unusual harmonic and rhythmic devices in his sophisticated songcraft" and was an important influence on progressive country.

On his own style, Miller remarked that he "tried to do" things like other artists, but that it "always came out different", so he got "frustrated" until realizing, "I'm the only one that knows what I'm thinking." He commented that the favorite song that he wrote was "You Can't Rollerskate in a Buffalo Herd". Johnny Cash discussed Miller's bass vocal range in his 1997 autobiography. He stated that it was the closest to his own that he had heard.

== Personal life and death ==
Miller was married three times and fathered eight children. Miller married Barbara Crow, from Shamrock, Texas, when they were both 17. Together the couple had four children, the first of whom died shortly after birth. As Miller's young family grew, his desire for fame and success continued to grow as well. After moving the family to California for a short time, Miller and Barbara divorced. Subsequent public interest in Miller led to the success for which he had long hoped, but it also brought struggles that are often associated with life in the entertainment business: periods of burnout as well as alcohol and substance abuse. His amphetamine use in the 1960s has been described as both damaging to his career and helpful to his songwriting. In 1972, he referred to amphetamines as "a snake pit I got into" and supported a ban on the drug in Oklahoma.

Miller married Leah Kendrick of San Antonio in 1964. Together the couple had two children, Dean and Shannon.

After 14 years of marriage, Leah and Miller divorced in the mid-1970s. Miller eventually married Mary Arnold, whom he met through Kenny Rogers. Arnold was a replacement member in the First Edition, a band led by Rogers. After the breakup of the First Edition, she performed with her husband, Miller, on tours as a backup singer. This included a performance at the White House before President Gerald Ford. In 2009, she was inducted into the Iowa Rock 'n' Roll Hall of Fame. Since Miller's death, she has managed his estate. She sued Sony for copyright infringement in the 2007 case Roger Miller Music, Inc. v. Sony/ATV Publishing, LLC, which went to the U.S. Court of Appeals for the Sixth Circuit. Arnold was ultimately awarded nearly $1 million in royalties and rights to the songs Miller wrote in 1964.

Miller was a lifelong cigarette smoker. During a television interview, Miller explained how he composed his songs from "bits and pieces" of ideas he wrote on scraps of paper. When asked what he did with the unused bits and pieces, he half-joked, "I smoke 'em!" He also wrote a song about his habit, titled "Dad Blame Anything a Man Can't Quit". Miller died of lung and throat cancer in 1992 at age 56, shortly after the discovery of a malignant tumor beneath his vocal cords.

== Filmography ==
- Waterhole No. 3 (1967) – Balladeer (voice)
- Daniel Boone (1969) – Johnny Appleseed
- Robin Hood (1973) – Alan-a-Dale – the Rooster (voice)
- Sesame Street (1975) - Himself
- Nestor, the Long–Eared Christmas Donkey (1977) – Spieltoe
- The Muppet Show season 3, episode 21 (airdate: May 10, 1979) – Himself
- Quincy, M.E. (1983) On Dying High season 8, episode 16 (undated CF 2825 well)
- Murder, She Wrote season 1, episode 5, "It's a Dog's Life" (airdate: November 4, 1984) - the Sheriff
- Lucky Luke (1991) – Jolly Jumper (voice)
- Lucky Luke (8 episodes, 1992) – Jolly Jumper/narrator (voice)

== Awards ==
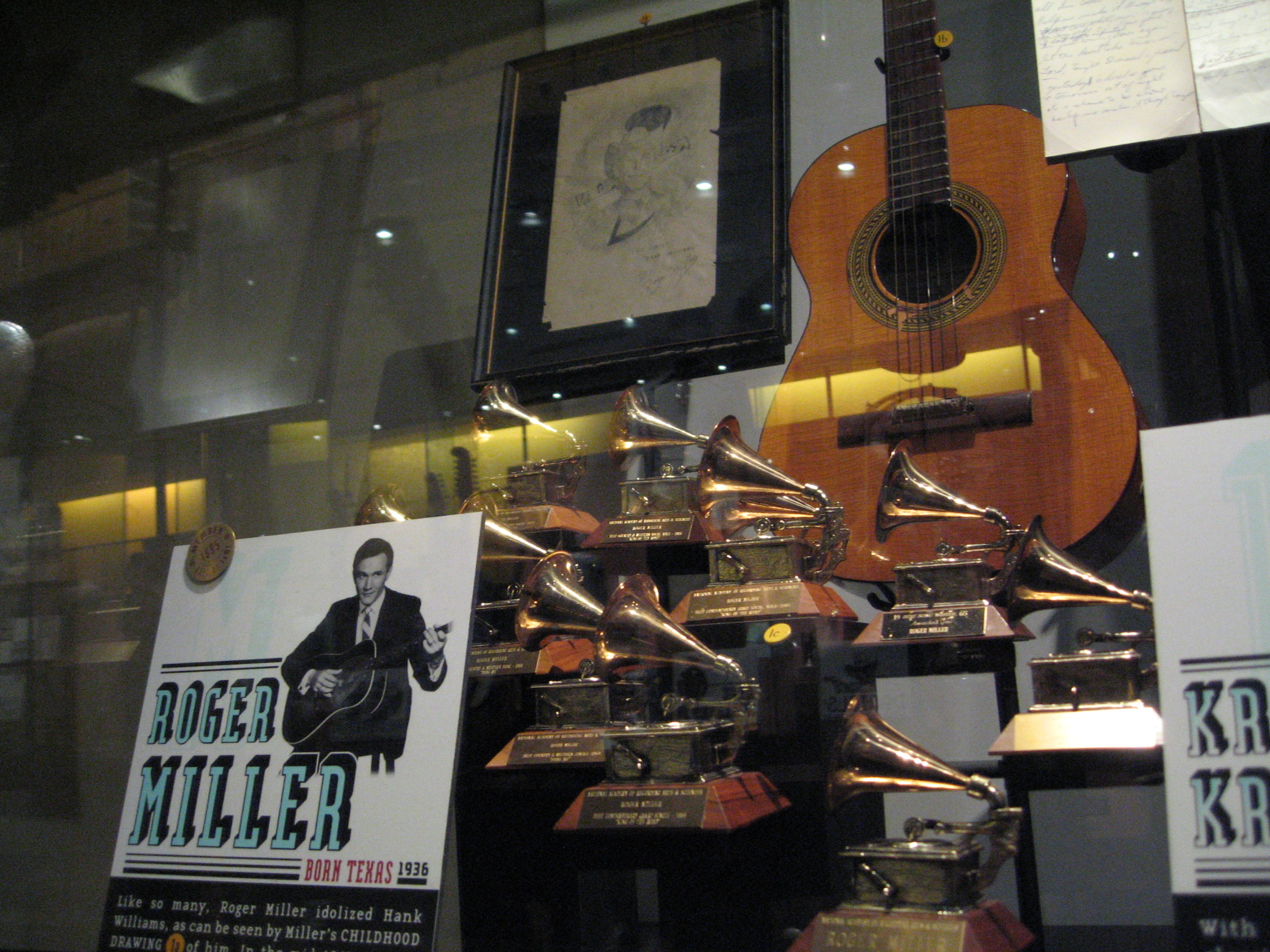
Miller's Grammy Awards at the Country Music Hall of Fame and Museum

In addition to 11 Grammy Awards, Roger Miller won Broadway's Tony Award for writing the music and lyrics for Big River, which won a total of 7 Tony's including best musical in 1985. He was voted into the Nashville Songwriters Hall of Fame in 1973 and the Country Music Hall of Fame in 1995. Miller won 11 Grammy Awards. In Erick, Oklahoma, where he grew up, a thoroughfare was renamed "Roger Miller Boulevard" and a museum dedicated to Miller was built on the road in 2004.

Awards won by Miller:

- 1964 — Grammy Award for Best Country Song: "Dang Me"
- 1964 — Grammy Award for Best New Country and Western Artist
- 1964 — Grammy Award for Best Country and Western Recording, Single: "Dang Me"
- 1964 — Grammy Award for Best Country and Western Performance, Male: "Dang Me"
- 1964 — Grammy Award for Best Country and Western Album: "Dang Me"/"Chug-a-Lug"
- 1965 — Jukebox Artist of the Year
- 1965 — Grammy Award for Best Country Song: "King of the Road"
- 1965 — Grammy Award for Best Country Vocal Performance, Male: "King of the Road"
- 1965 — Grammy Award for Best Country and Western Recording, Single: "King of the Road"
- 1965 — Grammy Award for Best Country Vocal Performance, Male: "King of the Road"
- 1965 — Grammy Award for Best Contemporary (Rock 'N Roll), Single: "King of the Road"
- 1965 — Grammy Award for Best Country and Western Album: "The Return of Roger Miller"
- 1965 — Academy of Country and Western Music: "Best Songwriter"
- 1965 — Academy of Country and Western Music: "Man of the Year"
- 1973 — Nashville Songwriters Hall of Fame
- 1985 — Tony Award for Best Original Score (Music and/or Lyrics) Written for the Theatre: Big River
- 1985 — Drama Desk Award for Outstanding Lyrics: Big River
- 1988 — Academy of Country Music: Pioneer Award
- 1995 — Country Music Hall of Fame (Inducted with Jo Walker-Meador)
- 1997 — Grammy Hall of Fame Song : "Dang Me"
- 1998 — Grammy Hall of Fame Song : "King of the Road"
- 2003 — CMT's 40 Greatest Men of Country Music: Ranked No. 23.
