= Buck Owens discography =

- Studio albums: 39
- Live albums: 10
- Compilation albums: 16
- Singles: 97
- B-sides: 12
- No. 1 Singles (USA): 21

The discography of Buck Owens, an American country music artist, consists of 39 studio albums, 16 compilation albums, 9 live albums, 97 singles, and 12 B-sides. After recording under the name Corky Jones and releasing a string of singles in the mid-1950s, Owens signed a recording contract with Capitol Records in February 1957.

After releasing a series of singles over four years, Owens issued his first studio album in 1961, titled Buck Owens Sings Harlan Howard, which included the #2 country hit "Foolin' Around". In 1962, Owens's second effort, You're for Me, also gained success after spawning three major hits and was followed by 1963's On the Bandstand. The songs "Act Naturally" and "Love's Gonna Live Here", released from his album The Best of Buck Owens (1963), were the first of 21 number one singles on the Billboard Hot Country Songs chart. The songs set the trend for a series of Top 10 hits on the Billboard country chart and 13 number-one singles, including "I've Got a Tiger by the Tail", "Buckaroo", and "Open Up Your Heart".

During the 1960s and 1970s, Owens also issued a string of live albums, beginning with Carnegie Hall Concert (1966), which reached #1 on the Billboard Top Country Albums chart. That was followed by 1967's In Japan!, Buck Owens in London "Live" (1969), and Buck Owens Live in Scandinavia (1970). He had major hits in 1970 and 1971 with "The Kansas City Song", "I Wouldn't Live in New York City (If They Gave Me the Whole Damn Town)", "Bridge Over Troubled Water", "Ruby (Are You Mad)", and "Rollin' in My Sweet Baby's Arms". During this time, Owens also collaborated with up-and-coming country artist Susan Raye on the albums We're Gonna Get Together (1970) and The Great White Horse (1970). Owens continued to record under Capitol until his contract expired in 1975 with the release of 41st Street Lonely Heart's Club/Weekend Daddy.

In 1975, Owens signed with Warner Bros. Records and began recording in Nashville, Tennessee. He gained less creative control of his material, and his singles peaked in gradually lower chart positions. He issued two albums under the label: Buck 'Em (1976) and Our Old Mansion (1977). In 1979, his duet with Emmylou Harris, "Play Together Again, Again", reached number 11 on the Billboard Hot Country Songs chart. After leaving the label at the beginning of the 1980s, Owens semi-retired from the music business but returned with Dwight Yoakam in 1988 for the duet "Streets of Bakersfield". The song became his first number-one single since 1972's "Made in Japan", providing Owens a comeback. With the success of the single, Owens returned to recording under Capitol with Hot Dog (1988), Act Naturally (1989), and Kickin' In (1991).

In 2018, Omnivore Recordings released Country Singer's Prayer, an album that Owens recorded for Capitol in November 1975 but was shelved in the wake of its singles ("The Battle of New Orleans" and "Country Singer's Prayer") having had little success on the charts.

== Studio albums ==
| Title | Album details | Peak chart positions | |
| Title | Album details | US Country | US |
|---|---|---|---|
| Buck Owens | Release date: January 30, 1961; Label: Capitol | — | — |
| Buck Owens Sings Harlan Howard | Release date: August 28, 1961; Label: Capitol | — | — |
| You're for Me | Release date: October 1, 1962; Label: Capitol | — | — |
| On the Bandstand | Release date: April 29, 1963; Label: Capitol | — | — |
| Buck Owens Sings Tommy Collins | Release date: November 11, 1963; Label: Capitol | 1 | — |
| Together Again | Release date: July 20, 1964; Label: Capitol | 1 | 88 |
| I Don't Care | Release date: November 2, 1964; Label: Capitol | 1 | 135 |
| I've Got a Tiger by the Tail | Release date: March 10, 1965; Label: Capitol | 1 | 43 |
| Before You Go | Release date: July 26, 1965; Label: Capitol | 1 | — |
| The Instrumental Hits of Buck Owens and His Buckaroos | Release date: July 26, 1965; Label: Capitol | 4 | — |
| Roll Out the Red Carpet | Release date: February 7, 1966; Label: Capitol | 1 | 106 |
| Dust on Mother's Bible | Release date: May 2, 1966; Label: Capitol | 1 | — |
| Open Up Your Heart | Release date: December 27, 1966; Label: Capitol | 1 | — |
| Your Tender Loving Care | Release date: August 7, 1967; Label: Capitol | 1 | 177 |
| It Takes People Like You | Release date: January 2, 1968; Label: Capitol | 1 | — |
| Sweet Rosie Jones | Release date: July 1, 1968; Label: Capitol | 2 | — |
| The Guitar Player | Release date: 1968; Label: Capitol | 27 | — |
| I've Got You on My Mind Again | Release date: December 30, 1968; Label: Capitol | 19 | 199 |
| Tall Dark Stranger | Release date: September 29, 1969; Label: Capitol | 2 | 122 |
| Big in Vegas | Release date: December 29, 1969; Label: Capitol | 9 | 141 |
| Your Mother's Prayer | Release date: March 2, 1970; Label: Capitol | — | 198 |
| The Kansas City Song | Release date: July 6, 1970; Label: Capitol | 10 | 196 |
| I Wouldn't Live in New York City | Release date: 1970; Label: Capitol | 12 | 190 |
| Bridge Over Troubled Water | Release date: February 15, 1971; Label: Capitol | 11 | — |
| Ruby | Release date: June 21, 1971; Label: Capitol | 9 | — |
| In the Palm of Your Hand^{[A]} | Release date: January 8, 1973; Label: Capitol | 21 | — |
| Ain't It Amazing Gracie | Release date: March 14, 1973; Label: Capitol | 17 | — |
| Arms Full of Empty | Release date: 1973; Label: Capitol | 32 | — |
| It's a Monster's Holiday | Release date: 1974; Label: Capitol | 10 | — |
| 41st Street Lonely Heart's Club/Weekend Daddy | Release date: May 6, 1975; Label: Capitol | 21 | — |
| Buck 'Em | Release date: 1976; Label: Warner Bros. Records | — | — |
| Our Old Mansion | Release date: 1977; Label: Warner Bros. Records | — | — |
| Hot Dog! | Release date: 1988; Label: Capitol Nashville | 37 | — |
| Act Naturally | Release date: 1989; Label: Capitol Nashville | — | — |
| Kickin' In | Release date: 1991; Label: Capitol Nashville | — | — |
| Country Singer's Prayer | Release date: 2018; Label: Omnivore Recordings | — | — |
"—" denotes releases that did not chart

== Holiday albums ==
| Title | Album details | Peak positions |
| Title | Album details | US |
|---|---|---|
| Christmas with Buck Owens and his Buckaroos | Release date: October 4, 1965; Label: Capitol | 12 |
| Christmas Shopping | Release date: October 7, 1968; Label: Capitol | 31 |

== Collaborations ==
| Title | Album details | Peak chart positions | |
| Title | Album details | US Country | US |
|---|---|---|---|
| We're Gonna Get Together (with Susan Raye) | Release date: April 6, 1970; Label: Capitol | 10 | 154 |
| The Great White Horse (with Susan Raye) | Release date: September 8, 1970; Label: Capitol | 22 | — |
| Merry Christmas from Buck Owens and Susan Raye (with Susan Raye) | Release date: 1971; Label: Capitol | — | — |
| Too Old to Cut Mustard (with Buddy Alan) | Release date: January 2, 1972; Label: Capitol | 35 | — |
| The Good Old Days (Are Here Again) (with Susan Raye) | Release date: July 1973; Label: Capitol | 29 | — |
"—" denotes releases that did not chart

== Live albums ==
| Title | Album details | Peak chart positions | |
| Title | Album details | US Country | US |
|---|---|---|---|
| Carnegie Hall Concert | Release date: July 26, 1966; Label: Capitol | 1 | 114 |
| In Japan! | Release date: May 1, 1967; Label: Capitol | 1 | — |
| Buck Owens in London "Live" | Release date: June 2, 1969; Label: Capitol | 5 | 113 |
| Buck Owens Live in Scandinavia | Release date: 1970; Label: Capitol | — | — |
| Live at John Ascuga's Nugget | Release date: 1972; Label: Capitol | 3 | — |
| Live at the White House | Release date: 1972; Label: Capitol | 10 | — |
| Live in New Zealand | Release date: 1974; Label: Capitol | — | — |
| Live at the Sydney Opera House | Release date: 1974; Label: Capitol | — | — |
| Live in Austin, TX | Release date: 2007; Label: New West | — | — |
| At The Mint: Buck Owens Live In Vegas | Release date: October 23, 2026; Label: Sundazed Music | —* | —* |
"—" denotes releases that did not chart

== Compilation albums ==
| Title | Album details | Peak positions | Certifications (sales threshold) |
| Title | Album details | US Country | Certifications (sales threshold) |
|---|---|---|---|
| Buck Owens | Release date: 1960; Label: La Brea | — | |
| Buck Owens | Release date: January 30, 1961; Label: Capitol | — | |
| The Fabulous Country Music Sound of Buck Owens | Release date: 1962; Label: Starday | — | |
| The Best of Buck Owens | Release date: June 1, 1964; Label: Capitol | 2 | US: Gold |
| Best of Buck Owens, Vol. 2 | Release date: April 1, 1968; Label: Capitol | 5 | |
| Best of Buck Owens, Vol. 3 | Release date: 1969; Label: Capitol | 12 | |
| Merry Hee Haw Christmas | Release date: 1970; Label: Capitol | 34 | |
| The Best of Buck Owens, Vol. 4 | Release date: October 4, 1971; Label: Capitol | 17 | |
| The Best of Buck and Susan (with Susan Raye) | Release date: 1972; Label: Capitol | 15 | |
| The Best of Buck Owens, Vol. 5 | Release date: 1974; Label: Capitol | 35 | |
| The Best of Buck Owens, Vol. 6 | Release date: 1976; Label: Capitol | 34 | |
| The Very Best of Buck Owens, Vol. 1 | Release date: 1994; Label: Rhino | — | |
| The Very Best of Buck Owens, Vol. 2 | Release date: 1994; Label: Rhino | — | |
| 21 #1 Hits: The Ultimate Collection | Release date: August 1, 2006; Label: Rhino | 55 | |
| Coloring Book (EP) | Release date: April 21, 2012; Label: Omnivore | 63 | |
| Honky Tonk Man: Buck Sings Country Classics | Release date: January 23, 2013; Label: Omnivore | — | |
| Classic #1 Hits | Release date: 2015; Label: Cracker Barrel/Omnivore | 49 | |
| Bakersfield Gold: Top 10 Hits 1959–1974 | Release date: Oct 7, 2022; Label: Omnivore | — | |
"—" denotes releases that did not chart

== Singles ==
=== 1950s ===
| Year | Single | Peak positions | Album |
| Year | Single | US Country | Album |
|---|---|---|---|
| 1956 | "Down on the Corner of Love" | — | The Fabulous Country Music; Sound of Buck Owens |
| 1956 | "Right After the Dance" | — | The Fabulous Country Music; Sound of Buck Owens |
| 1956 | "Hot Dog" (as Corky Jones) | — | non-album singles |
| 1957 | "I'd Rather Have You" (with Pauline Parker) | — | non-album singles |
| 1957 | "There Goes My Heart" | — | non-album singles |
| 1957 | "Country Girl (Leaving Dirty Tracks)" | — | non-album singles |
| 1957 | "Come Back" | — | non-album singles |
| 1958 | "Sweet Thing" | — | non-album singles |
| 1958 | "I'll Take a Chance on Loving You" | — | Buck Owens |
| 1959 | "Second Fiddle" | 24 | Buck Owens |
| 1959 | "Under Your Spell Again" | 4 | Buck Owens |
"—" denotes releases that did not chart

=== 1960s ===
| Year | Single | Peak chart positions | | | | Album |
| Year | Single | US Country | US | CAN Country | CAN | Album |
|---|---|---|---|---|---|---|
| 1960 | "Above and Beyond" | 3 | — | — | 8 | Buck Owens |
| 1960 | "Excuse Me (I Think I've Got a Heartache)" | 2 | — | — | — | Buck Owens |
| 1960 | "Heartaches for a Dime" | — | — | — | — | Buck Owens Sings Harlan Howard |
| 1961 | "Foolin' Around" | 2 | 113 | — | — | Buck Owens Sings Harlan Howard |
| 1961 | "Under the Influence of Love" | 2 | — | — | — | You're for Me |
| 1962 | "Nobody's Fool but Yours" | 11 | — | — | — | You're for Me |
| 1962 | "Save the Last Dance for Me" | 11 | — | — | — | Together Again |
| 1962 | "Kickin' Our Hearts Around" | 8 | — | — | — | On the Bandstand |
| 1962 | "You're for Me" | 10 | — | — | — | You're for Me |
| 1963 | "Act Naturally" | 1 | — | — | — | The Best of Buck Owens |
| 1963 | "Love's Gonna Live Here" | 1 | — | — | — | The Best of Buck Owens |
| 1964 | "My Heart Skips a Beat" | 1 | 94 | — | — | Together Again |
| 1964 | "I Don't Care (Just as Long as You Love Me)"^{[A]} | 1 | 92 | 1 | — | I Don't Care |
| 1964 | "I've Got a Tiger by the Tail" | 1 | 25 | — | 12 | I've Got a Tiger by the Tail |
| 1965 | "Before You Go"^{[B]} | 1 | 83 | — | — | Before You Go |
| 1965 | "Only You (Can Break My Heart)" | 1 | 120 | — | — | Your Tender Loving Care |
| 1965 | "Buckaroo" | 1 | 60 | — | — | The Instrumental Hits of Buck Owens and His Buckaroos |
| 1966 | "Waitin' in Your Welfare Line" | 1 | 57 | — | 92 | Open Up Your Heart |
| 1966 | "Think of Me" | 1 | 74 | — | — | Open Up Your Heart |
| 1966 | "Open Up Your Heart" | 1 | — | — | — | Open Up Your Heart |
| 1966 | "Where Does the Good Times Go" | 1 | 114 | — | — | It Takes People Like You |
| 1967 | "Sam's Place" | 1 | 92 | — | — | Your Tender Loving Care |
| 1967 | "Your Tender Loving Care" | 1 | — | — | — | Your Tender Loving Care |
| 1967 | "It Takes People Like You (To Make People Like Me)" | 2 | 114 | 1 | — | It Takes People Like You (To Make People Like Me) |
| 1968 | "How Long Will My Baby Be Gone" | 1 | — | 16 | — | Sweet Rosie Jones |
| 1968 | "Sweet Rosie Jones" | 2 | — | 4 | — | Sweet Rosie Jones |
| 1968 | "Let the World Keep On a Turnin'" (with Buddy Alan) | 7 | — | 36 | — | I've Got You on My Mind Again |
| 1968 | "I've Got You on My Mind Again" | 5 | — | 6 | — | I've Got You on My Mind Again |
| 1968 | "Things I Saw Happening at the Fountain" | — | — | — | — | The Guitar Player |
| 1969 | "Who's Gonna Mow Your Grass" | 1 | 106 | 1 | — | Buck Owens in London "Live" |
| 1969 | "Johnny B. Goode" (live) | 1 | 114 | 4 | — | Buck Owens in London "Live" |
| 1969 | "Tall Dark Stranger" | 1 | — | 1 | — | Tall Dark Stranger |
| 1969 | "Big in Vegas" | 5 | 100 | 1 | — | Big in Vegas |
"—" denotes releases that did not chart

- A "I Don't Care" also made the AC charts, #18.
- B "Before You Go" also made the AC charts, #20.

=== 1970s ===
| Year | Single | Peak chart positions | | | Album |
| Year | Single | US Country | US | CAN Country | Album |
|---|---|---|---|---|---|
| 1970 | "The Kansas City Song" | 2 | — | 6 | The Kansas City Song |
| 1970 | "I Wouldn't Live in New York City (If They Gave Me the Whole Dang Town)" | 9 | 110 | — | I Wouldn't Live in New York City |
| 1971 | "Bridge Over Troubled Water" | 9 | 119 | 8 | Bridge Over Troubled Water |
| 1971 | "Ruby (Are You Mad)" | 3 | 106 | 3 | Ruby |
| 1971 | "Rollin' in My Sweet Baby's Arms" | 2 | — | 1 | Ruby |
| 1972 | "I'll Still Be Waiting for You" (live) | 8 | — | 8 | Live at John Ascuaga's Nugget |
| 1972 | "Made in Japan" | 1 | — | 1 | In the Palm of Your Hand |
| 1972 | "You Ain't Gonna Have 'Ol Buck to Kick Around No More" | 13 | — | 11 | In the Palm of Your Hand |
| 1972 | "In the Palm of Your Hand" | 23 | — | 23 | In the Palm of Your Hand |
| 1973 | "Ain't It Amazing Gracie" | 14 | — | 7 | Ain't It Amazing Gracie |
| 1973 | "Arms Full of Empty" | 27 | — | 22 | Arms Full of Empty |
| 1973 | "Big Game Hunter" | 8 | — | 7 | The Best of Buck Owens, Vol. 5 |
| 1974 | "On the Cover of Music City News" | 9 | — | 13 | It's a Monster's Holiday |
| 1974 | "(It's A) Monster's Holiday" | 6 | — | 9 | It's a Monster's Holiday |
| 1974 | "Great Expectations" | 8 | — | 41 | It's a Monster's Holiday |
| 1975 | "41st Street Lonely Heart's Club" | 19 | — | 30 | 41st Street Lonely Heart's Club |
| 1975 | "The Battle of New Orleans" | 51 | — | — | The Best of Buck Owens, Vol. 6 |
| 1975 | "Country Singer's Prayer" | — | — | — | The Best of Buck Owens, Vol. 6 |
| 1976 | "Hollywood Waltz" | 44 | — | — | Buck 'Em |
| 1976 | "California Okie" | 43 | — | — | Buck 'Em |
| 1977 | "World Famous Holiday Inn" | 90 | — | — | Our Old Mansion |
| 1977 | "It's Been a Long, Long Time" | 100 | — | — | Buck 'Em |
| 1977 | "Our Old Mansion" | 91 | — | — | Our Old Mansion |
| 1977 | "Let the Good Times Roll" | — | — | — | Our Old Mansion |
| 1978 | "Nights Are Forever Without You" | 27 | — | 55 | non-album singles |
| 1978 | "Do You Wanna Make Love" | 80 | — | — | non-album singles |
| 1979 | "Play Together Again, Again" (with Emmylou Harris) | 11 | — | 44 | non-album singles |
| 1979 | "Hangin' In and Hangin' On" | 30 | — | — | non-album singles |
| 1979 | "Let Jesse Rob the Train" | 22 | — | 49 | non-album singles |
"—" denotes releases that did not chart

=== 1980s–1990s ===
| Year | Single | Peak chart positions | | Album |
| Year | Single | US Country | CAN Country | Album |
|---|---|---|---|---|
| 1980 | "Love Is a Warm Cowboy" | 42 | — | non-album singles |
| 1980 | "Moonlight and Magnolia" | 72 | — | non-album singles |
| 1981 | "Without You" | 92 | — | non-album singles |
| 1988 | "Hot Dog" | 46 | — | Hot Dog |
| 1989 | "A-11" | 54 | — | Hot Dog |
| 1989 | "Put a Quarter in the Jukebox" | 60 | 60 | Hot Dog |
| 1989 | "Act Naturally" (with Ringo Starr) | 27 | 62 | Act Naturally |
| 1989 | "Gonna Have Love" (re-recording) | 76 | 79 | Act Naturally |
| 1990 | "Tijuana Lady" | — | — | Act Naturally |
| 1992 | "If You Can't Find a Reason to Be Happy" | — | — | Disney Country Kids |
"—" denotes releases that did not chart

== Other singles ==
=== Collaborations ===
| Year | Single | Artist | Peak chart positions | | Album |
| Year | Single | Artist | US Country | CAN Country | Album |
|---|---|---|---|---|---|
| 1961 | "Mental Cruelty" | Rose Maddox | 8 | — | non-album singles |
| 1963 | "We're the Talk of the Town" | Rose Maddox | 15 | — | non-album singles |
| 1970 | "We're Gonna Get Together" | Susan Raye | 13 | 6 | We're Gonna Get Together |
| 1970 | "Togetherness" | Susan Raye | 12 | 18 | We're Gonna Get Together |
| 1970 | "The Great White Horse" | Susan Raye | 8 | 9 | The Great White Horse |
| 1971 | "Too Old to Cut Mustard" | Buddy Alan | 29 | 25 | Too Old to Cut Mustard |
| 1971 | "Santa's Gonna Come in a Stage Coach" | Susan Raye | — | — | Merry Christmas from Buck Owens and Susan Raye |
| 1972 | "Looking Back to See" | Susan Raye | 13 | — | The Best of Buck and Susan |
| 1973 | "The Good Ol' Days Are Here Again" | Susan Raye | 35 | 52 | The Good Ol' Days (Are Here Again) |
| 1975 | "Love Is Strange" | Susan Raye | 20 | 47 | We're Gonna Get Together |
"—" denotes releases that did not chart

=== Guest singles ===
| Year | Single | Artist | Peak positions | | Album |
| Year | Single | Artist | US Country | CAN Country | Album |
|---|---|---|---|---|---|
| 1988 | "Streets of Bakersfield" | Dwight Yoakam | 1 | 1 | Buenas Noches from a Lonely Room |
| 1997 | "(Don't Put Me In) The Ex-Files" | The Bellamy Brothers | — | — | Lonely Planet |
| 1998 | "First Redneck on the Internet" | Cledus T. Judd | — | — | Did I Shave My Back for This? |
| 2001 | "I Was There" | Dwight Yoakam | — | — | Tomorrow's Sounds Today |
"—" denotes releases that did not chart

=== Christmas singles ===
| Year | Single | Peak positions | Album |
| Year | Single | US Christmas | Album |
|---|---|---|---|
| 1965 | "Santa Looked a Lot Like Daddy" | 2 | Christmas with Buck |
| 1968 | "Christmas Shopping" | 5 | Christmas Shopping |

=== International singles ===
| Year | Single | Peak positions | Album |
| Year | Single | NLD | Album |
|---|---|---|---|
| 1970 | "Amsterdam" | 13 | The Kansas City Song |

== Charted B-sides ==
| Year | B-side | Peak chart positions | | Original A-side |
| Year | B-side | US Country | US | Original A-side |
|---|---|---|---|---|
| 1960 | "I've Got a Right to Know" | 25 | — | "Excuse Me (I Think I've Got a Heartache)" |
| 1961 | "High as the Mountains" | 27 | — | "Foolin' Around" |
| 1961 | "Loose Talk" (with Rose Maddox) | 4 | — | "Mental Cruelty" |
| 1962 | "I Can't Stop (My Lovin' You)" | 17 | — | "Kickin' Our Hearts Around" |
| 1963 | "House Down the Block" | 24 | — | "You're for Me" |
| 1963 | "Sweethearts of Heaven" (with Rose Maddox) | 19 | — | "We're the Talk of the Town" |
| 1964 | "Together Again" | 1 | — | "My Heart Skips a Beat" |
| 1964 | "Don't Let Her Know" | 33 | 130 | "I Don't Care (Just as Long as You Love Me)" |
| 1965 | "Gonna Have Love" | 10 | — | "Only You (Can Break My Heart)" |
| 1965 | "If You Want a Love" | 24 | — | "Buckaroo" |
| 1966 | "In the Palm of Your Hand" | 43 | — | "Waitin' in Your Welfare Line" |
| 1975 | "Weekend Daddy" | flip | — | "41st Street Lonely Hearts Club" |
"—" denotes releases that did not chart

== Music videos ==
| Year | Video | Director |
|---|---|---|
| 1988 | "Streets of Bakersfield" (with Dwight Yoakam) | Marcus Stevens |
| 1988 | "Hot Dog" | Mick Kleber |
| 1989 | "Act Naturally" (with Ringo Starr) | George Bloom |
| 1992 | "Act Naturally" | Russ Bates |
| 1992 | "If You Can't Find a Reason to Be Happy" | Michael Salomon |
| 1998 | "First Redneck on the Internet" (with Cledus T. Judd) | John Lloyd Miller |
| 1999 | "The Ex Files" (with The Bellamy Brothers) | |

== Notes ==
- A In the Palm of Your Hand also peaked at number 70 on the RPM Top Albums chart in Canada.
