= It Takes People Like You =

It Takes People Like You to Make People Like Me

Studio album by Buck Owens
- Released: January 2, 1968
- Recorded: June 1967
- Studio: Capitol (Hollywood)
- Genre: Country
- Label: Capitol ST-2841
- Producer: Ken Nelson

Buck Owens chronology
| Your Tender Loving Care (1967) | It Takes People Like You to Make People Like Me (1968) | Best of Buck Owens, Vol. 2 (1968) |

It Takes People Like You to Make People Like Me (or simply It Takes People Like You) is the tenth studio album (and Owens fifteenth overall) by Buck Owens and his Buckaroos, released in 1968.

It was re-released on CD in 1997 by Sundazed Music with two bonus tracks, including the mono single version of the title track.

== Reception ==
Professional ratings
Review scores
| Source | Rating |
|---|---|
| Allmusic | 2.5/5 stars |

In his Allmusic review, critic Cub Koda wrote "By this time, Owens had found his groove, crafting one fine single after another, making each new album almost seem like a greatest-hits collection, even if every song wasn't actually a chart number."

== Track listing ==
All songs by Buck Owens unless otherwise noted.

1. "It Takes People Like You (To Make People Like Me)" – 2:01
2. "The Way That I Love You" – 2:35
3. "We Were Made for Each Other" – 2:17
4. "That's How I Measure My Love for You" (Owens, Don Rich) – 2:41
5. "If I Knew" (Ed King, Owens) – 2:33
6. "I'm Gonna Live It Up" (Owens, Rich) – 2:13
7. "Where Does the Good Times Go" – 2:18
8. "You Left Her Lonely Too Long" – 2:55
9. "Let the World Keep on a Turnin'" – 2:06
10. "I've Got It Bad for You" (Owens, Rich) – 2:01
11. "Long, Long Ago" – 2:12
12. "Heartbreak Mountain" – 2:09
  1995 bonus tracks:
13. "It Takes People Like You (To Make People Like Me)" – 2:01
14. "Where Does the Good Times Go" – 2:17

== Personnel ==
- Buck Owens – vocals, guitar, harmony vocals
- Don Rich – guitar, fiddle, harmony vocals, National Steel guitar
- Doyle Holly – guitar, bass
- Tom Brumley – pedal steel guitar
- Jimmy Bryant – guitar
- Willie Cantu – drums, tambourine
- Bert Dodson – guitar, bass
- Donald Frost – bass
- Bob Morris – bass
- Jelly Sanders – guitar, fiddle
- Wayne Wilson – guitar

== Charts ==
Chart performance for It Takes People Like You
| Chart (1968) | Peak position |
|---|---|
| US Top Country Albums (Billboard) | 1 |
