= The Best of Buck Owens =

Greatest hits album by Buck Owens
- Released: June 1, 1964
- Recorded: October 1958 – July 1963, Capitol Recording Studio, Hollywood, CA
- Genre: Country
- Label: Capitol ST-2105
- Producer: Ken Nelson

Buck Owens chronology
Buck Owens Sings Tommy Collins (1963)	The Best of Buck Owens (1964)	Together Again (1964)

Singles from The Best of Buck Owens
- 1. "Act Naturally" Released: March 11, 1963; 2. "Love's Gonna Live Here" Released: August 16, 1963

Professional ratings
Review scores
Source	Rating
Allmusic	link

The Best of Buck Owens is a compilation album by Buck Owens, released in 1964. It reached Number two on the Billboard Country Albums charts and Number 46 on the Pop Albums charts. It also peaked at No. 1 in Norway and stayed on the charts for 222 weeks there, becoming the most successful album of all time in that country.

== Track listing ==
=== Side one ===
1. "Love's Gonna Live Here" (Buck Owens)
2. "Foolin' Around" (Harlan Howard, Owens)
3. "Excuse Me (I Think I've Got a Heartache)" (Owens)
4. "I Can't Stop My Lovin' You" (Owens, Don Rich)
5. "Kickin' Our Hearts Around" (Wanda Jackson)
6. "Under the Influence of Love" (Howard, Owens)

=== Side two ===
1. "Act Naturally" (Johnny Russell, Voni Morrison)
2. "Under Your Spell Again" (Owens, Dusty Rhodes)
3. "Above and Beyond" (Howard)
4. "Second Fiddle" (Owens)
5. "Nobody's Fool But Yours" (Owens)
6. "High as the Mountains" (Owens)

== Charts ==
Chart performance for The Best of Buck Owens
Chart (1964–1970)	Peak position
Norwegian Albums (VG-lista)	1
US Billboard 200	46
US Top Country Albums (Billboard)	2
