= Christmas Shopping (album) =

Studio album by Buck Owens
- Released: October 7, 1968
- Recorded: February – June 1968
- Studio: Capitol (Hollywood)
- Genre: Country, Christmas
- Length: 30:03
- Label: Capitol ST-2977
- Producer: Ken Nelson

Buck Owens chronology
Sweet Rosie Jones (1968)	Christmas Shopping (1968)	The Guitar Player (1968)

Christmas Shopping is a Christmas album by Buck Owens and His Buckaroos released in 1968 charting for one week at # 31 on Billboard's Best Best For Christmas Album chart. It is his second holiday-themed album, following 1965's Christmas with Buck Owens.

It was re-issued on CD by Sundazed Music in 1999, and again via digital download in 2011.

== Reception ==
Professional ratings
Review scores
Source	Rating
Allmusic	3/5 stars

In his Allmusic review, critic Cub Koda called the album "a more slickly produced album than its predecessor."

== Track listing ==
All songs by Buck Owens unless otherwise noted.

=== Side one ===
1. "Christmas Shopping" – 2:18
2. "Christmas Time Is Near" (Owens, Red Simpson) – 3:00
3. "The Jolly Christmas Polka" – 2:15 (instrumental)
4. "All I Want for Christmas Is My Daddy" (Owens, Jimmy Snyder) – 2:51
5. "Merry Christmas from Our House to Yours" – 2:50
6. "Good Old Fashioned Country Christmas" (Owens, Earl Poole Ball) – 2:36

=== Side two ===
1. "One of Everything You Got" (Owens, Bob Morris) – 2:24
2. "Home on Christmas Day" – 2:13
3. "Christmas Schottische" – 2:05 (instrumental)
4. "A Very Merry Christmas" – 2:29
5. "It's Not What You Give" (Owens, Morris) – 3:03
6. "Tomorrow Is Christmas Day" (Owens, Don Rich) – 1:59
