= Country Pickin': The Don Rich Anthology =

Compilation album by Don Rich
- Released: December 19, 2000
- Recorded: 1963–70
- Genre: Country
- Label: Sundazed
- Producers: Ken Nelson, Buck Owens

Country Pickin': The Don Rich Anthology is a compilation album featuring Don Rich, American guitarist, fiddler, and long-time sideman of Buck Owens, released in 2000.

== History ==
Don Rich was the leader of The Buckaroos, Buck Owens' band, as well as Owens' collaborator and friend. He was a noted guitarist and fiddler who died in a motorcycle accident in 1974. Owens is quoted in the liner notes of this anthology saying "I think my musical life ended when his did." Rich is recognized as one of the chief architects of the Bakersfield sound.

Rich performed lead vocals on some of Owens' albums, and the Buckaroos released their own records. The tracks of the anthology are taken from The Buckaroos' solo albums.

The extensive liner notes by music historian and journalist Rich Kienzle include a biography, rare photos, and tributes from Owens, Dwight Yoakam, Merle Haggard, Marty Stuart and others.

== Reception ==
Professional ratings
Review scores
| Source | Rating |
|---|---|
| Allmusic | 4/5 stars |
| No Depression | (favorable) |

While praising the compilation and Rich's contributions to Buck Owens' career, music critic Stephen Thomas Erlewine called the songs "solid, respectable songs, delivered handsomely" and "[It] might not be a lost classic, but it's fine listening and an appropriate, loving testament to one of the finest guitarists and musicians of his time."

Writing for No Depression magazine, David Hill expressed similar sentiments, writing: "Country Pickin’ makes it clear just how talented Rich was. Most of the songs were culled from the Buckaroos’ solo albums on Capitol, and while you can’t really compare them to the best of Owens’ work — classics such as “Cryin’ Time” or “Act Naturally” or “Together Again” — that’s not really the point. These were recorded in a different spirit, probably at the end of Owens’ regular sessions. But they hardly sound tossed-off. Country Pickin’ may not be essential listening, but it sure is a lot of fun."

== Track listing ==
1. "Buckaroo" (Bob Morris) – 2:01
2. "Orange Blossom Special" (Ervin T. Rouse) – 2:09
3. "I'm Layin' It on the Line" (Don Rich) – 2:27
4. "The Happy Go Lucky Guitar" (Buck Owens, Rich) – 1:57
5. "Cajun Fiddle" (Owens, Rich) – 1:45
6. "Out of My Mind" (Rich, Red Simpson) – 3:23
7. "Round Hole Guitar" (Owens, Rich) – 2:22
8. "Tumwater Breakdown" (Rich) – 1:54
9. "Chicken Pickin'" (Owens, Rich) – 2:08
10. "Love's Gonna Come a Knockin'" (Owens, Rich) – 1:56
11. "Buckersfield Breakdown" (Morris, Rich) – 2:00
12. "I'll Be Swingin' Too" (Owens, Rich) – 2:03
13. "Sad Is the Lonely" (Bobby Warren, Harlow Wilcox) – 2:47
14. "Pretty Girl" (Rich) – 1:45
15. "Chaparral" (Morris, Rich) – 1:58
16. "I'm Coming Back Home to Stay" (Rich) – 2:14
17. "Spanish Moonlight" (Rich) – 2:10
18. "Saturday Night" (Rich) – 1:50
19. "I'm Goin' Back Home Where I Belong" (Rich) – 2:19
20. "Aw Heck" (Rich) – 1:51
21. "Georgia Peach" (Rich) – 1:19
22. "Tim-Buck-Too" (Rich) – 2:22
23. "Pickin-Nickin'" (Rich) – 2:35
24. "Country Pickin'" (Owens, Rich) – 1:42

== Personnel ==
- Don Rich – guitar, fiddle, vocals
- Buck Owens – guitar
- Doyle Holly – bass, guitar, background vocals
- Jay McDonald – steel guitar
- Tom Brumley - pedal steel guitar
- Jelly Sanders – guitar
- Red Simpson – guitar
- Wayne Wilson – guitar
- Bob Morris – bass
- Kenny Pierce – bass
- Ken Presley – drums
- Willie Cantu – drums
- Jerry Wiggins – drums

Production notes:

- Ken Nelson – producer
- Buck Owens – producer
- Bob Irwin – mastering
- Tim Livingston – project manager
- Efram Turchick – project manager
- Rich Kienzle – liner notes
- Rich Russell – design
