= The Fabulous Country Music Sound of Buck Owens =

Compilation album by Buck Owens
- Released: October 1, 1962
- Genre: Country
- Label: Starday SLP 172
- Producer: Virginia Richmond

Buck Owens chronology
| Buck Owens Sings Harlan Howard (1961) | The Fabulous Country Music Sound of Buck Owens (1962) | You're for Me (1962) |

The Fabulous Country Music Sound of Buck Owens is an album by American country artist Buck Owens, released in 1962. It is not completely a Buck Owens album and includes tracks by Dottie West, Cowboy Copas, Eddie Wilson and Tommy Hill.

== Track listing ==
1. "Down on the Corner of Love" (Buck Owens), performed by Buck Owens
2. "There Goes My Love" (Owens), performed by Buck Owens
3. "Above and Beyond (The Call of Love)" (Harlan Howard), performed by Tommy Hill
4. "House Down the Block" (Owens), performed by Buck Owens
5. "Under the Influence of Love" (Howard, Owens), performed by Cowboy Copas
6. "Mental Cruelty" (Larry Davis, Dixie Davis, Owens), performed by Cowboy Copas & Dottie West
7. "Sweethearts in Heaven" (Owens), performed by Buck Owens
8. "It Don't Show on Me" (Owens), performed by Buck Owens
9. "Foolin' Around" (Howard, Owens), performed by Eddie Wilson
10. "Right After the Dance" (Owens), performed by Buck Owens
11. "Excuse Me (I Think I've Got a Heartache)" (Howard, Owens), performed by Darrell McCall
12. "Loose Talk" (Freddie Hart, Ann Lucas), performed by Cowboy Copas & Dottie West
