= Buck Owens (disambiguation) =

Buck Owens was an American singer and guitarist.

Buck Owens may also refer to:

- Buck Owens (1960 album)
- Buck Owens (1961 album)
- "Buck Owens", a song by Melvins from the 1996 album Stag
