= Best of Buck Owens, Vol. 2 =

Greatest hits album by Buck Owens
- Released: 1968
- Genre: Country
- Label: Capitol ST-2897
- Producer: Ken Nelson

Buck Owens chronology
| It Takes People Like You (1968) | Best of Buck Owens, Vol. 2 (1968) | Sweet Rosie Jones (1968) |

Professional ratings
Review scores
| Source | Rating |
|---|---|
| AllMusic | 4.5/5 stars |
| The Encyclopedia of Popular Music | 4/5 stars |

Best of Buck Owens, Vol. 2 is a compilation album by Buck Owens, released in 1968.

The album peaked at #5 on the Billboard Top Country Albums chart.

Capitol deleted the album after Owens departed the label for Warner Bros. Records, in 1977.

== Critical reception ==
AllMusic called the album "a must for any serious country & western fan."

== Track listing ==
All songs by Buck Owens unless otherwise noted.

=== Side one ===
1. "I've Got a Tiger by the Tail" (Harlan Howard, Owens)
2. "Together Again"
3. "Act Naturally" (Johnny Russell, Voni Morrison)
4. "Before You Go" (Owens, Don Rich)
5. "Waitin' in Your Welfare Line" (Owens, Rich, Nat Stuckey)
6. "My Heart Skips a Beat"

=== Side two ===
1. "Open Up Your Heart"
2. "Think of Me" (Estelle Olson, Rich)
3. "Buckaroo" (Bob Morris)
4. "I Don't Care (Just as Long as You Love Me)"
5. "Only You (Can Break My Heart)"
6. "Love's Gonna Live Here"

== Personnel ==
- Harlan Howard - composer
- Bob Morris - composer
- Voni Morrison - composer
- Estella Olson - composer
- Buck Owens - composer, guitar, primary artist, vocals
- Buck Ram - composer
- Ande Rand - composer
- Don Rich - composer
- Johnny Russell - composer
- Nat Stuckey - composer

== Charts ==
Chart performance for Best of Buck Owens, Vol. 2
| Chart (1968) | Peak position |
|---|---|
| US Top Country Albums (Billboard) | 5 |
