= On the Bandstand =

Studio album by Buck Owens
- Released: April 29, 1963
- Recorded: 1962
- Studio: Capitol (Hollywood)
- Genre: Country
- Label: Capitol
- Producer: Ken Nelson

Buck Owens chronology
You're for Me (1962)	On the Bandstand (1963)	Buck Owens Sings Tommy Collins (1963)

On the Bandstand is the fourth studio album by American country music artist Buck Owens, released in 1963. It peaked at Number 2 on the Billboard Country Albums charts.

The CD re-issued in 1995 by Sundazed Music includes "Sweethearts in Heaven" and "We're the Talk of the Town", 1963 Top 20 duet single Owens recorded with Rose Maddox.

== Reception ==
Professional ratings
Review scores
Source	Rating
Allmusic	3/5 stars

In his Allmusic review, critic Richie Unterberger wrote "One of Buck's rootsier '60s Capitol albums"

== Track listing ==
1. "Saw Mill" (Mel Tillis, Horace Whatley) – 2:25
2. "King of Fools" (Buck Owens, Red Simpson) – 2:34
3. "Sally Was a Good Old Girl" (Harlan Howard) – 2:22
4. "I Can't Stop (My Lovin' You)" (Owens, Don Rich) – 2:46
5. "Orange Blossom Special" (Ervin Rouse) – 2:08
6. "Cotton Fields" (Lead Belly) – 2:13
7. "Kickin' Our Hearts Around" (Wanda Jackson) – 2:36
8. "Touch Me" (Willie Nelson) – 3:08
9. "Sweethearts in Heaven" (Owens) – 2:57
10. "Release Me" (Eddie Miller, Dub Williams, Robert Yount) – 2:36
11. "One Way Love" (Owens) – 2:26
12. "Diggy Liggy Lo" (J. D. Miller) – 2:16
  1995 reissue bonus tracks:
13. "Sweethearts in Heaven" (Owens) – 2:51
14. "We're the Talk of the Town" (Owens, Rollie Weber) – 2:06

== Personnel ==
- Buck Owens – guitar, vocals
- Don Rich – guitar, fiddle, lead vocals on "Sally Was a Good Old Girl"
- Ralph Mooney – pedal steel guitar
- Jim Pierce – piano
- Jelly Sanders – fiddle, guitar
- Wayne Stone – drums
- Kenny Pierce – bass, lead vocals on "Touch Me"
- John Maddox – guitar
- Rose Maddox – vocals
- Bobby Austin – bass
- George French – piano
- Jay McDonald – pedal steel guitar
- Ken Presley – drums

== Charts ==
Chart performance for On the Bandstand
Chart (1964)	Peak position
US Top Country Albums (Billboard)	2
