= Sweet Rosie Jones =

Studio album by Buck Owens
- Released: July 1, 1968
- Recorded: August–December 1967
- Studio: Capitol (Hollywood)
- Genre: Country
- Label: Capitol ST-2962
- Producer: Ken Nelson

Buck Owens chronology
Best of Buck Owens, Vol. 2 (1968)	Sweet Rosie Jones (1968)	Christmas Shopping (1968)

Sweet Rosie Jones is the eleventh studio album (and Owens sixteenth overall) by Buck Owens and his Buckaroos, released in 1968.

== Track listing ==
All songs by Buck Owens unless otherwise noted.

=== Side one ===
1. "Hello Happiness Goodbye Loneliness"
2. "Sweet Rosie Jones"
3. "If I Had Three Wishes" (Owens, Don Rich)
4. "Swinging Doors" (Merle Haggard)
5. "You'll Never Miss the Water" (Owens, Rich)
6. "Sally Mary and Jerry" (Owens, Rolly Weber)

=== Side two ===
1. "How Long Will My Baby Be Gone"
2. "Leave Me Something to Remember You By" (Owens, Rich)
3. "Heartaches Have Just Started" (Owens, Rich)
4. "Everybody Needs Somebody"
5. "Girl on Sugar Pie Lane" (Tommy Collins)
6. "Happy Times Are Here Again"

== Charts ==
Chart performance for Sweet Rosie Jones
Chart (1968)	Peak position
US Top Country Albums (Billboard)	2
