= Just Another Cowboy Song =

Studio album by Doyle Holly
- Released: 1973
- Recorded: 1973
- Genre: Country
- Label: Barnaby Records
- Producer: Ken Mansfield

Doyle Holly chronology
Doyle Holly (1973)	Just Another Cowboy Song (1973)

Just Another Cowboy Song is the second solo album by long time Buck Owens and the Buckaroos guitarist and vocalist Doyle Holly. It was released in 1973 and reached number thirty-one on the Billboard Country charts. "Lila" was the album's first single; it peaked at number 17 on the top 20 Billboard Country Singles chart.

Other singles released were "Just Another Cowboy Song", "Darling Are You Ever Coming Home" and "Lord How Long Has This Been Going On".

The back of the album contains a photograph of Doyle Holly and friend Kris Kristofferson.

The album peaked on the US Top Country Albums chart at #31.

== Track listing ==
=== Side one ===
1. "Lila" (Bob Milsap) – 2:43
2. "I Overlooked An Orchid" (Carl Story, Carl Smith, Shirly Lynn) – 2:58
3. "Mama Lou" (Larry Murray) – 3:34
4. "Darling, Are You Ever Coming Home" (Willie Nelson, Hank Cochran) – 2:10
5. "Just Another Cowboy Song" (Dennis Coats) – 2:09

=== Side two ===
1. "Lord How Long Has This Been Going On" (Lee Morris) – 2:36
2. "January Bittersweet Jones" (Pat Bunch, Jimmy Chappell) – 2:57
3. "What Price Gloria" (Pat Bunch, Jimmy Chappell) – 2:47
4. "Watch Out Woman" (Glen Mooney) – 3:49
5. "The Dumb Thing" (Bob Morris) – 2:20
6. "(Villain Mean) Woman Scorned" (J. Cunningham, C.A. Isop, R. Duncan) - 3:25
