= Doyle Holly (album) =

Studio album by Doyle Holly
- Released: 1973
- Recorded: 1972–1973
- Genre: Country
- Label: Barnaby Records
- Producer: Ken Mansfield

Doyle Holly chronology
Doyle Holly (1973)	Just Another Cowboy Song (1973)

Doyle Holly is the debut solo studio album by Doyle Holly, a long time and original member of Buck Owens and the Buckaroos. It was released in 1973 and reached #43 on the Billboard Country charts. "Queen of the Silver Dollar" was the album's first single which cracked the top 20 on the Billboard Country Singles chart.

Other singles released were "Leaves," "Slow Poke," and "My Heart Cries for You."

== Track listing ==
=== Side one ===
1. "Queen of the Silver Dollar" (Shel Silverstein) (Arranged and backing vocals by Waylon Jennings)– 3:25
2. "Don't Rob Another Man's Castle" (Jenny Lou Carson) – 2:41
3. "Take a Walk in the Country" (Ken Mansfield, Dann Lottermoser) – 2:32
4. "June" (Norman Stephens) – 2:37
5. "Leaves" (Rafe Van Hoy) (Arranged by Waylon Jennings) – 2:09
6. "Your Country Lovin" (Stephens, Pippin) – 2:12

=== Side two ===
1. "Slow Poke" (Pee Wee King, Redd Stewart, Chilton Price) (Arranged by Waylon Jennings) – 2:20
2. "Take Some and Give Some (And Leave Some Behind)" (Barry De Vorzon) (Arranged by Waylon Jennings) – 2:08
3. "Headed for the Country" (Larry Murray) – 2:56
4. "All the Way from Alabama" (Conny Van Dyke) – 2:42
5. "My Heart Cries for You" (Carl Sigman, Percy Faith) – 2:47
