= Buck Owens Sings Harlan Howard =

Studio album by Buck Owens
- Released: August 28, 1961
- Recorded: December 1960
- Studio: Capitol (Hollywood)
- Genre: Country
- Length: 31:22
- Label: Capitol
- Producer: Ken Nelson

Buck Owens chronology
Buck Owens (1961)	Buck Owens Sings Harlan Howard (1961)	The Fabulous Country Music Sound of Buck Owens (1962)

Buck Owens Sings Harlan Howard is the second studio album by American musician Buck Owens, released on August 28, 1961 by Capitol Records.

Harlan Howard wrote many of Buck Owens' biggest hits, including "I've Got a Tiger By the Tail," "Above and Beyond," "Excuse Me (I Think I've Got a Heartache)," and "Under the Influence of Love".

The CD re-issued in 1997 by Sundazed Music includes "Foolin' Around", the single that reached Number two on the Billboard Country singles charts.

== Reception ==
Professional ratings
Review scores
Source	Rating
Allmusic	5/5 stars

In his Allmusic review, critic Stephen Thomas Erlewine wrote "Owens sang Howard better than nearly anybody and Buck Owens Sings Harlan Howard is full of wonderful songs and performances. ... one of Owens' most enjoyable LPs of the '60s."

== Track listing ==
All songs written by Harlan Howard, except where noted.

No.	Title	Writer(s)	Length
1.	"Foolin' Around"	Howard, Buck Owens	2:37
2.	"Heartaches for a Dime"		2:27
3.	"Heartaches by the Number"		2:28
4.	"Let's Agree to Disagree"	Howard, Owens	2:22
5.	"Keeper of the Key"	Ken Devine, Lance Guynes, Howard, Beverly Stewart	2:32
6.	"I Don't Believe I'll Fall in Love Today"		2:22
7.	"Pick Me Up on Your Way Down"		2:27
8.	"I'll Catch You When You Fall"		2:08
9.	"Lyin' Again"		2:16
10.	"The One You Slip Around With"	Howard, Owens	2:29
11.	"Think It Over"	Owens	2:16
12.	"Keys in the Mailbox"		2:26
13.	"Foolin' Around"	Howard, Owens	2:32

== Personnel ==
- Buck Owens – guitar, vocals, harmony vocals
- Don Rich – guitar, fiddle
- Pee Wee Adams – drums
- Bobby Austin – bass
- George French – piano
- Ralph Mooney – pedal steel guitar
- Jim Pierce – piano
- Jelly Sanders – fiddle
- Wayne Stone – drums
- Allen Williams – bass

Production notes

- Bob Irwin – producer, mastering
- Ken Nelson – producer
- Richard Russell – design
