= Your Tender Loving Care =

Studio album by Buck Owens
- Released: August 7, 1967
- Recorded: November 1966
- Studio: Capitol (Hollywood)
- Genre: Country
- Length: 29:07 LP/33:52 CD reissue
- Label: Capitol ST-2760
- Producer: Ken Nelson

Buck Owens chronology
In Japan! (1967)	Your Tender Loving Care (1967)	It Takes People Like You (1968)

Your Tender Loving Care is the ninth studio album (and Owens fourteenth overall) by Buck Owens and his Buckaroos, released in 1967.

It was re-released on CD in 1995 by Sundazed Music with two bonus tracks.

== Reception ==
Professional ratings
Review scores
Source	Rating
Allmusic	3.5/5 stars

In his AllMusic review, critic Greg Adams wrote of the CD reissue "Despite the impression that it is a collection of leftovers, the singularity of Owens' stylistic vision prevents the album from seeming like a hodgepodge. No surprises await the faithful, but this is solid material."

== Track listing ==
All songs by Buck Owens unless otherwise noted.

=== Side one ===
1. "Your Tender Loving Care" – 2:45
2. "Song and Dance" – 2:05
3. "Only You (Can Break My Heart)" – 2:19
4. "What a Liar I Am" – 2:41
5. "Someone With No One to Love" (Buck Owens, Red Simpson) – 2:19
6. "Rocks in My Head" – 2:16

=== Side two ===
1. "Sam's Place" (Owens, Simpson) – 2:00
2. "If I Had You Back Again" – 2:54
3. "House of Memories" (Merle Haggard) – 2:57
4. "Only You (And You Alone)" (Robert J. Wooten) – 2:14
5. "Don't Ever Tell Me Goodbye" (Owens, Simpson) – 2:32
6. "You Made a Monkey Out of Me" (Owens and Don Rich) – 2:05

1995 bonus tracks:

1. "Your Tender Loving Care" – 2:46
2. "Sam's Place" (Owens, Simpson) – 1:59

== Charts ==
Chart performance for Your Tender Loving Care
Chart (1967)	Peak position
US Billboard 200	177
US Top Country Albums (Billboard)	1
