= In Japan! (Buck Owens album) =

Live album by Buck Owens
- Released: May 1, 1967
- Recorded: January 1967, Kōsei Nenkin Kaikan, Tokyo, Japan
- Genre: Country
- Label: Capitol ST-2715
- Producer: Ken Nelson

Buck Owens chronology
| Open Up Your Heart (1966) | In Japan! (1967) | Your Tender Loving Care (1967) |

In Japan! is a live album by Buck Owens and his Buckaroos, released in 1967.

== Reception ==
Professional ratings
Review scores
| Source | Rating |
|---|---|
| Allmusic | 4.5/5 stars |

In his Allmusic review, critic Cub Koda called the album "Long one of the finer efforts in the Buck Owens album catalog and also one of the finest live country records of all time, In Japan! shines... Although his Live at Carnegie Hall album is considered by most fans as definitive, here's another one that shouldn't be dismissed for a second."

== Track listing ==
All songs by Buck Owens unless otherwise noted.

1. "Opening Remarks by Tetsuo Otsuka"
2. "Adios, Farewell, Goodbye, Good Luck, So Long"
3. "I Was Born to Be in Love With You"
4. "Open Up Your Heart"
5. "Second Fiddle"
6. "Fiddle Polka" (Don Rich)
7. "Fishin' on the Mississippi" (Bob Morris)
8. "Way That I Love You"
9. "Tokyo Polka" (Owens, Willie Cantu)
10. "Where Does the Good Times Go"
11. "Steel Guitar Polka" (Tom Brumley, Owens)
12. "Don't Wipe the Tears That You Cry for Him on My Good White Shirt" (Morris)
13. "Drum So-Low" (Cantu)
14. "Roll Out the Red Carpet"
15. "We Were Made for Each Other"

== Charts ==
Chart performance for In Japan!
| Chart (1967, 1973) | Peak position |
|---|---|
| Australia (Kent Music Report) | 31 |
| US Top Country Albums (Billboard) | 1 |

== Personnel ==
- Buck Owens – vocals, guitar
- Don Rich – guitar, fiddle, vocals
- Tom Brumley – pedal steel guitar
- Wayne Wilson – bass, vocals
- Willie Cantu – drums
