= Waylon Sings Ol' Harlan =

Studio album by Waylon Jennings
- Released: March 1967
- Recorded: May – June 1966
- Studio: RCA Studio A (Nashville, Tennessee)
- Genre: Country
- Length: 28:02
- Label: RCA Victor
- Producer: Chet Atkins

Waylon Jennings chronology
Nashville Rebel (1966)	Waylon Sings Ol' Harlan (1967)	Love of the Common People (1967)

Waylon Sings Ol' Harlan is the fifth studio album by American country music artist Waylon Jennings, released on RCA Victor in 1967. It consists completely of songs by Harlan Howard.

== Background ==
Jennings had a great affection for Howard's songs, and most of his 1960s albums contain at least one song by Howard. This LP features some of Howard's most popular compositions, such as the standard "Heartaches By the Number," "Busted," (which had also been covered by Johnny Cash and Ray Charles), and two songs co-written with Buck Owens, "I've Got a Tiger By the Tail" and "Foolin' Around." It was not as successful as Jennings' previous releases, peaking at No. 32 on the Billboard Hot Country LP's chart.

== Recording ==
In his autobiography, Jennings cited the LP as the first proper album he recorded after he was living in Nashville, recording it in two sessions spaced a week apart on May 24 and June 1, 1966 with his backing group the Waylors. The singer later recalled:

We rehearsed the album the night before each recording session, setting the band up in Harland's office with a small two-track tape recorder. Don Davis helped on the arrangements. Some had been big hits and some hadn't. One of my favourites was 'Beautiful Annabel Lee,' which Harlan wrote after the Edgar Allan Poe poem. I'm not sure we ever beat the office version of 'She Called Me Baby,' despite all the leakage and phones ringing and general mayhem.

By his own estimation, Jennings covered over seventy of Howard's tunes, and later said, "Harlan was everybody's friend...I was writing more and more, and Harlan talked to me continually about the craft, giving me advice."

Professional ratings
Review scores
Source	Rating
Allmusic	link

== Track listing ==
All songs by Harlan Howard, except where noted.

1. "She Called Me Baby" – 2:34
2. "Sunset and Vine" – 2:08
3. "Woman Let Me Sing You a Song" – 2:18
4. "The Everglades" – 2:10
5. "She's Gone, Gone, Gone" – 2:01
6. "Busted" – 2:19
7. "Beautiful Annabel Lee" – 2:43
8. "Heartaches by the Number" – 2:08
9. "I've Got a Tiger By the Tail" (Howard, Buck Owens) – 2:26
10. "Heartaches for a Dime" – 2:15
11. "Foolin' Around" (Howard, Owens) – 2:19
12. "In This Very Same Room" – 2:41

== Bibliography ==
- Jennings, Waylon; Kaye, Lenny (1996). Waylon: An Autobiography. Warner Brooks. ISBN 978-0-446-51865-9.
