= Heartaches by the Number =

Single by Guy Mitchell
- B-side: "Two"
- Released: August 31, 1959
- Recorded: August 24, 1959
- Studio: Columbia 7th Ave (New York City)
- Genre: Country
- Length: 2:34
- Label: Columbia
- Songwriter: Harlan Howard
- Producer: Joe Sherman

Guy Mitchell singles chronology
"I'm Gonna Leave You Now" (1959)	"Heartaches by the Number" (1959)	"The Same Old Me" (1960)

"Heartaches by the Number" is a popular country song written by Harlan Howard, and published in 1959. The sheet music was a best seller in both the US and Britain in January 1960.

== Background ==
The song mentions three heartaches, listed by the narrator:

The first one is when the narrator's lover leaves him. The lover returns, but never means to stay, and this causes the second round of anguish. Thirdly, the lover calls stating she plans to return but the narrator waits in vain for the knock on his door and suggests that she has lost her way.

The chorus tells how the lover loves the narrator "less every day"; however, the narrator declares, "Each day I love you more." Although it is apparent that he has "heartaches by the number" and "a love that I can't win", the narrator asserts that the day he stops counting is the "day my world would end".

== Guy Mitchell version ==
The biggest hit version was recorded by Guy Mitchell on August 24, 1959. The recording was released by Columbia Records on August 31, 1959, as catalog number 41476. It spent the weeks of December 14 and December 21, 1959 at No. 1 on the U.S. Billboard Hot 100. This version was included on the in-game radio in Fallout: New Vegas.

== Other notable recordings ==
- 1959 Ray Price – recorded before the Guy Mitchell version.(Columbia 41374). Price reached #2 and spent 40 weeks on the Billboard Hot C&W Sides chart.
- 1961 George Jones – on the Mercury label album George Jones Sings Country and Western Hits (MG 20624/SR 60624).
- 1961 Kitty Wells – for her LP Heartbreak U.S.A..
- 1961 Buck Owens – included on his album Buck Owens Sings Harlan Howard.
- 1962 Connie Francis – for the album Country Music – Connie Style.
- 1962 Leroy Van Dyke – on the Mercury album Walk on By (MG 20682/SR 60682).
- 1965 Bing Crosby – for his album Bing Crosby Sings the Great Country Hits.
- 1965 Johnny Tillotson – a single release on the MGM label.
- 1966 Willie Nelson – as part of his album Country Favorites-Willie Nelson Style.
- 1967 Waylon Jennings – for the album Waylon Sings Ol' Harlan.
- 1968 Burl Ives – on the Decca album The Big Country Hits.
- 1969 Jerry Lee Lewis – for the album Sings the Country Music Hall of Fame Hits, Vol. 1.
- 1969 Country Joe and the Fish – performed at Woodstock
- 1970 Jane Morgan – her album Jane Morgan – In Nashville.
- 1972 Jack Reno – reached #26 on the Billboard Hot Country Singles chart.
- 1979 Bill Haley and His Comets – on Haley's final album, Everyone Can Rock and Roll (Sonet 808)
- 1983 The Kendalls – the album 20 Favorites
- 1986 Dwight Yoakam – on his debut studio album Guitars, Cadillacs, Etc., Etc..
- 2005 Martina McBride (featuring Dwight Yoakam) – for her album Timeless.
- 2009 Rosanne Cash (featuring Elvis Costello) – the record The List.
- 2013 The Playtones – on their album In the Mood.
- 2014 Mary Sarah in a duet version featuring Ray Price – a track on her album Bridges: Great American Country Duets.
- 2016 Cyndi Lauper – included on her studio album Detour.
- 2026 Lonnie Lee - On the album Together Again

== Charts ==
=== Ray Price ===
Chart (1959)	Peak position
US Billboard Hot Country Singles	2

=== Guy Mitchell ===
Chart (1959)	Peak position
US Billboard Hot 100	1
US Hot Rhythm & Blues Singles	19
German Singles Chart	2
Canada CHUM Chart3 weeks @	1
Norway VG-Lista	3
UK Singles Chart	5

==== All-time charts ====
Chart (1958–2018)	Position
US Billboard Hot 100	407

=== Johnny Tillotson ===
Chart (1965)	Peak position
US Billboard Hot 100	35
US Easy Listening	4
Canadian RPM Top Singles	14

=== Jack Reno ===
Chart (1972)	Peak position
US Billboard Hot Country Singles	26

== See also ==
- List of Billboard Hot 100 number ones of 1959
