= You're for Me =

Studio album by Buck Owens
- Released: October 1, 1962
- Studio: Capitol (Hollywood)
- Genre: Country
- Label: Capitol ST-1777
- Producer: Ken Nelson, Virginia Richmond

Buck Owens chronology
The Fabulous Country Music Sound of Buck Owens (1962)	You're for Me (1962)	On the Bandstand (1963)

Professional ratings
Review scores
Source	Rating
Allmusic	4/5 stars

You're for Me is the third studio album by American country music artist Buck Owens, released in 1962.

It was re-issued in 1995 by Sundazed Music with two bonus tracks.

== Track listing ==
1. "You're for Me" (Tommy Collins, Buck Owens) – 2:15
2. "Fool Me Again" (Dusty Rhodes, Rolly Weber) – 2:36
3. "Down on the Corner of Love" (Owens) – 2:22
4. "Mexican Polka" (Owens) – 2:08
5. "Mirror, Mirror on the Wall" (Owens, Don Rollins) – 2:12
6. "Bad Bad Dream" (Owens) – 2:30
7. "Under the Influence of Love" (Harlan Howard, Owens) – 2:21
8. "Nobody's Fool But Yours" (Owens) – 2:30
9. "House Down the Block" (Owens) – 2:29
10. "Country Polka" (Owens) – 2:14
11. "Down to the River" (Owens) – 2:51
12. "Blues for Life" (Owens) – 2:20
  1995 reissue bonus tracks:
13. "Under the Influence of Love" (Howard, Owens) – 2:22
14. "You're for Me" (Collins, Owens) – 2:14

== Recorded ==
- May 24, 1961, Capitol Recording Studio, Hollywood (6,7,8)
- Sept 26, 1961, Capitol Recording Studio, Hollywood (1,9)
- Dec 5, 1961, Capitol Recording Studio, Hollywood (5)
- Jan 1962, Capitol Recording Studio, Hollywood (2,3,4,10,11,12)
