= In Japan =

In Japan may refer to:

- In Japan (Mr. Big album), 2002
- In Japan! (Buck Owens album), 1967
- The Jackson 5 in Japan, also known as In Japan
