= Buck Owens (1961 album) =

Studio album by Buck Owens
- Released: January 30, 1961
- Recorded: 1957–1960
- Studio: Capitol (Hollywood)
- Genre: Country
- Length: 32:21
- Label: Capitol T-1489
- Producers: Ken Nelson, Virginia Richmond

Buck Owens chronology
Buck Owens (1960)	Buck Owens (1961)	Buck Owens Sings Harlan Howard (1961)

Buck Owens is the debut studio album by American musician Buck Owens, released on January 30, 1961 by Capitol Records. It would mark the beginning of a long association for Owens with producer Ken Nelson.

Owens' single "High as the Mountain" reached Number 27 on the Billboard Country Singles charts. It, and "Nobody's Fool But Yours", is included as a bonus track on the 1995 re-issue by Sundazed Music.

== Reception ==
Professional ratings
Review scores
Source	Rating
Allmusic	4/5 stars

In his Allmusic review, critic Cub Koda wrote of the CD reissue "Featuring Owens' early development of the Bakersfield sound... Transfers are astonishingly crisp and clear, showing producer Ken Nelson's touch to good advantage. The sound that became the legend starts right here."

== Track listing ==
All songs by Buck Owens unless otherwise noted.

1. "Above and Beyond" (Harlan Howard) – 2:24
2. "Second Fiddle" – 2:03
3. "Tired of Livin'" – 2:00
4. "I Gotta Right to Know" (Owens, Rolly Weber) – 2:32
5. "Excuse Me (I Think I've Got a Heartache)" (Howard, Owens) – 2:25
6. "I'll Give My Heart to You" – 2:00
7. "Under Your Spell Again" – 2:40
8. "My Everlasting Love" – 2:16
9. "Take Me Back Again" – 2:36
10. "'Til These Dreams Come True" (Owens, Dusty Rhodes) – 2:26
11. "Walk the Floors" (Owens, Rhodes) – 2:23
12. "I'll Take a Chance on Loving You" (Buck Owens, Lucy Cole)– 2:01
  1995 re-issue bonus tracks:
13. "High as the Mountains" – 2:21
14. "Nobody's Fool But Yours" – 2:14

== Recorded ==
- Oct 9, 1958, Capitol Recording Studio, Hollywood (2,8,11,12)
- June 16, 1959, Capitol Recording Studio, Hollywood (3,7)
- Dec 23, 1959, Capitol Recording Studio, Hollywood (1,4,5,10)
- Dec 3, 1960, Capitol Recording Studio, Hollywood (6,9)
