= Sings Tommy Collins =

Studio album by Buck Owens
- Released: November 11, 1963
- Recorded: July 1963
- Studio: Capitol (Hollywood)
- Genre: Country
- Length: 27:52
- Label: Capitol
- Producer: Ken Nelson

Buck Owens chronology
On the Bandstand (1963)	Sings Tommy Collins (1963)	The Best of Buck Owens (1964)

Sings Tommy Collins is the fifth studio album by Buck Owens, released in 1963. It reached number one on the Billboard Country Albums charts.

It was re-issued on CD in 1997 by Sundazed Music.

== Reception ==
Professional ratings
Review scores
Source	Rating
Allmusic	4.5/5 stars

In his Allmusic review, critic Stephen Thomas Erlewine wrote "Owens didn't have hits with this record, but it did go to number one, and it does stand as one of his most consistently satisfying long-players, thanks to the pen of Tommy Collins and the wonderful performances of Buck Owens & His Buckaroos."

== Track listing ==
All songs by Tommy Collins unless otherwise noted.

=== Side one ===
1. "If You Ain't Lovin' (You Ain't Livin') – 2:01
2. "But I Do" – 2:26
3. "It Tickles" (Tommy Collins, Wanda Collins) – 2:13
4. "I Always Get a Souvenir" – 2:19
5. "My Last Chance With You" – 2:26
6. "Smooth Sailin'" – 2:11

=== Side two ===
1. "You Gotta Have a License" – 2:15
2. "High on a Hilltop" – 2:32
3. "There'll Be No Other" – 2:48
4. "Whatcha Gonna Do Now?" – 2:24
5. "No Love Have I" – 2:18
6. "Down, Down, Down" – 1:59

== Personnel ==
- Buck Owens – guitar, vocals
- Don Rich – guitar, fiddle
- Mel King – drums
- Bob Morris – bass guitar
- Jay McDonald – pedal steel guitar
- Jelly Sanders – fiddle, guitar
- Bonnie Owens – vocals

Production notes

- Bob Irwin – mastering
- Ken Nelson – producer
- Richard Russell – design

== Charts ==
Chart performance for Sings Tommy Collins
Chart (1964)	Peak position
US Top Country Albums (Billboard)	1
