= Jimmy Snyder (musician) =

American country musician

James Snyder (September 17, 1934 – December 11, 2020) was an American country singer, songwriter, and guitarist from Wheeling, West Virginia who charted on the country and western music billboards in the 1960s and 1970s. and gained recognition for his work on the West coast country music scene, leading the house band at North Hollywood's historic Palomino Club. He became a prominent figurehead on the LA country scene during the 1970s, with strong influence. Snyder played the Grand Ole Opry in May 1970 with his biggest hit, “The Chicago Story.” Jimmy Snyder and the Palomino Riders won their first ACM (Academy of Country Music) award in 1980 for “Best Non-Touring Country Band".

In February 1970, he was nominated "Most Promising Artist of the Year" by Record News, Cashbox, and Billboard Magazine. Snyder soon found himself playing with Elvis Presley, appearing on several of his West Coast performances. Elvis Presley used to joke that Snyder actually sang the Presley song "Memories" on the record, because of Snyder's uncanny ability to imitate the singer's voice. Snyder worked with countless country music greats, including longtime friends Merle Haggard, with whom he recorded "Haggard State of Mind," and Willie Nelson. He penned the Buck Owens tune "All I Want For Christmas Is My Daddy" (Capitol Records) as well as Kay Adams' "Husband Stealer" at Tower Records. In recent years, Leon Russell invited Snyder to sing on "He'll Have To Go" for the Legend In My Time: Hank Wilson Vol. III album, released by Leon Russell in 1998. Russell was Snyder's piano player at the Rag Doll Club in North Hollywood.

Snyder died on December 11, 2020, at the age of 86.

== Early life and career ==
Jimmy Snyder was born in 1934 in New Brighton, Pennsylvania and soon moved to Wheeling, West Virginia as a young man, working as a coal miner to support his family. His professional music career began at the age of seventeen, when he was invited to play on the local WWVA radio show, "Wheeling Jamboree," in Wheeling, West Virginia. One of the earliest bands that Snyder played in was Toby Stroud and The Blue Mountain Boys. The boys primarily played bluegrass, boasting the talented fiddle player, Toby Stroud, who would soon have a very successful career as a bluegrass fiddler. Toby Stroud and The Blue Mountain Boys enjoyed minor success with their song entitled "Jesse James." Today, the song is recognized as a classic example of early Bluegrass music, oftentimes included on compilation albums. Snyder soon found his way to Los Angeles, California, after his service in the US military. He began playing with the Gene Davis band in the mid-1950s. By 1959, the Gene Davis Band had a regular gig at The Palomino Club of North Hollywood. Snyder began getting recognition, as the band was soon advertised as "The Gene Davis Band featuring Jimmy Snyder." Snyder left the Gene Davis Band in 1961 and found his own gig at the Rag Doll Club, while Gene Davis attempted to replace him with Johnny Paycheck, but Paycheck soon lost the gig and it was given to Jerry Inman.

Jimmy Snyder was first signed to country label Toppa Records in the early 1960s. Among other early Toppa artists were Gene Davis, Johnny and Jonie Mosby, Wade Ray, Johnny Dabbs, Kenny Brown, and Lina Lynne. He was briefly signed with K-Ark Records in the late 1960s. In February 1971, K-Ark merged with B.J.B Records of Hollywood and Snyder had releases in the weeks to follow, along with Tony Booth and Bobby Bakersfield. He signed with Wayside Records, where he enjoyed the most commercial success of his career, produced by Little Richie Johnson. It was under Johnson's production that Snyder scored his biggest hit, "The Chicago Story", a song about a soldier's wife seeing him off to war, with a twist ending that was considered to be controversial at the time of the single's release. By the 1970s he was signed with American Heritage Records. In 1972, the Shelby Singleton Corportatio signed a contract with American Heritage Records for exclusive distribution rights. While signed to American Heritage, Snyder's "Candy" reached the country charts. Little Richie Johnson once again produced Snyder on American Heritage

Snyder made several film appearances, including the cult classic "Rock All Night" and Clint Eastwood's "Any Which Way You Can".

Snyder left California in the 1980s and moved to Nashville, Tennessee, where he played in Printer's Alley, mentoring several aspiring country musicians, including Tim McGraw and Trace Adkins, giving them their first gigs. After playing Printer's Alley, he landed the house gig at Tootsie's World Famous Orchid Lounge, where he plays with the Jimmy Snyder Band.

== Singles ==
year	title	label
1961	Welcome To My Home	Toppa
1961	For The First Time	Toppa
1965	Are You Really Meant For Me?	K-Ark
1965	The Great Snowman	K-Ark
1967	Package C.O.D	K-Ark
1967	It's Tearing My Heart Out	K-Ark
1969	Candy All Over My Face	Wayside
1969	Here Comes My Sunshine	Wayside
1969	Out of My Mind	Wayside
1969	Pretty One	Wayside
1970	The Chicago Story	Wayside
1970	Take Her Flowers	Wayside
1970	Husbands and Wives	Wayside
1970	Ain't That Something	Wayside
1970	My Place In The Sun	American Heritage
1972	Candy In The Windows	American Heritage
1972	Play Now, Pay Later	American Heritage
1972	Almost Dawn In Denver	American Heritage
1972	Folsom Prison Blues	American Heritage
1972	Almost Dawn In Denver/Folsom Prison Blues	Bellaphon (Reissued)
1972	End of The World	American Heritage
1980	Just To Prove My Love To You	Blair
1980	Kiss Your Love Goodbye	Blair
1988	All The Magic's Gone	Blair
