= Jerry Brightman =

American pedal steel guitarist

- Born: Gerald Warner Brightman; September 1, 1953; Akron, Ohio, United States
- Died: March 9, 2015 (aged 61); Cuyahoga Falls, Ohio, United States
- Occupation: Pedal steel guitarist
- Known for: Guitarist for Buck Owens and The Buckaroos, Hee Haw
- Spouse: Kathleen Ruch (m. 1985–2015)
- Children: 2

Gerald Warner "Jerry" Brightman (September 1, 1953–March 9, 2015) was an American pedal steel guitarist who played for Buck Owens and The Buckaroos and featured on television's Hee Haw, along with performing on many top 10 records with Buck, Susan Raye, Tony Booth, and others.

== Biography ==
He was born on September 1, 1953, in Akron, Ohio.

Impressing audiences at an early age, he began playing professionally in 1966. After his run with the Buckaroos in 1975, he worked on the business side of the music industry from 1977 to 1982. He was also nominated for a position on the CMA Board of Directors. Jerry left the music business in 1982. In 2002, he returned to music and released his first solo CD, Back Again, and then a second one, titled Back Again, To the Country, in 2003 on Slidestation Productions. Major recording artists with Jerry appearing on include Buck Owens, Susan Raye, Tony Booth, Arlo Guthrie, and David Frizzell.

For a time he built a number of ‘Performance’-branded pedal steel guitars in Ohio.

He died in his sleep on March 9, 2015.
