= Charlie Walker (musician) =

American country singer-songwriter (1926–2008)

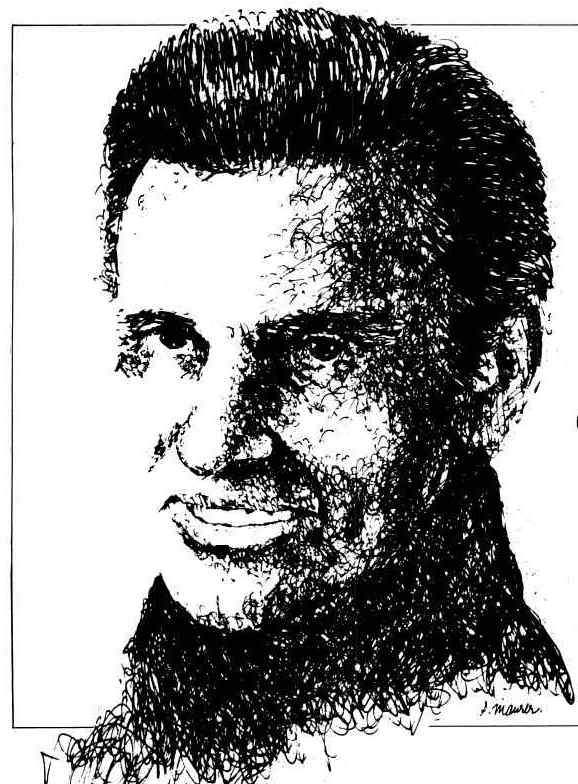
- Walker in a promotional drawing, 1967

Background information
- Born: Charles Levi Walker; November 2, 1926; Copeville, Texas, U.S.
- Died: September 12, 2008 (aged 81) Hendersonville, Tennessee, U.S.
- Genre: Country
- Occupation: Singer-songwriter
- Instrument: Guitar
- Years active: 1952–1979

Charles Levi Walker (November 2, 1926 – September 12, 2008) was an American country musician. His biggest success was with the song, "Pick Me Up on Your Way Down".

He held membership in the Grand Ole Opry from 1967, and was inducted into the Country Radio DJ Hall of Fame in 1981.

== Career ==
He was born in Copeville, Texas, United States in 1926. In 1943, Walker joined Bill Boyd's Cowboy Ramblers, and during World War II, he served as a disc jockey for the Armed Forces Radio Network.

Walker worked as a disc jockey from 1951 until 1961 at KMAC and then from 1961 up to 1963 at KENS in San Antonio, Texas, before signing with Decca Records. His first hit, "Only You, Only You" was co-written with Jack Newman and reached number 9 on the country chart in January 1956. Walker later signed with Columbia Records and reached number two with a Harlan Howard song, "Pick Me Up on Your Way Down". His other hits include "Who Will Buy the Wine", "Wild as a Wildcat", "Don't Squeeze My Sharmon", and "I Wouldn't Take Her to a Dogfight." Many of his records featured harmony vocals by Ray Price. His more popular recordings were of honky-tonk numbers, such as "Close All the Honky Tonks", and "Honky Tonk Women". Walker played a minor role in the 1985 Patsy Cline biographical film, Sweet Dreams.

Walker died of colon cancer in September 2008, at the age of 81 in Hendersonville, Tennessee.

== Discography ==
=== Albums ===
Year	Album	US Country	Label
1961	Greatest Hits		Columbia
1965	Close All the Honky Tonks		Epic
1966	Born to Lose		Epic
1966	Wine, Women and Walker		Epic
1967	Don't Squeeze My Sharmon	16	Epic
1968	Greatest Hits		Epic
1968	Country Style		Vocalion
1969	He Is My Everything		Epic
1969	Recorded Live in Dallas, Texas		Epic
1971	Honky Tonkin'		Epic
1972	I Don't Mind Goin' Under		RCA Victor
1973	Break Out the Bottle / Bring On the Music		RCA Victor
1978	Golden Hits		Plantation
1979	Texas Gold		Plantation

=== Singles ===
Year	Single	Chart Positions		Album
Year	Single	US Country	CAN Country	Album
1952	"I'm Looking for Another You"			singles only
1952	"Flaming Jewels"			singles only
1952	"Out of My Arms"			singles only
1953	"Flock of Memories"			singles only
1953	"Stay Away from My Heart"			singles only
1954	"Tell Her Lies and Feed Her Candy"			singles only
1954	"When You Know You Have Lost"			singles only
1955	"Chocolate Song"			singles only
1956	"Only You, Only You"	9		singles only
1956	"Stand Still"			singles only
1957	"Cheaters Never Win"			singles only
1957	"Dancing Mexican Girl"			singles only
1957	"Take My Hand"			singles only
1958	"Pick Me Up on Your Way Down"	2		Greatest Hits
1959	"I'll Catch You When You Fall"	16		Greatest Hits
1959	"When My Conscience Hurts the Most"	22		Greatest Hits
1960	"Who Will Buy the Wine"	11		Greatest Hits
1961	"Facing the Wall"	25		Greatest Hits
1961	"Right Back at Your Door"			Greatest Hits
1961	"Louisiana Belle"			singles only
1962	"Life Goes On (I Wonder Why)"			singles only
1962	"One in Every Crowd"			singles only
1963	"That's Where Katie Waits"			singles only
1964	"Close All the Honky Tonks"	17		Close All the Honky Tonks
1965	"Pick Me Up on Your Way Down"			Close All the Honky Tonks
1965	"Wild as a Wildcat"	8		single only
1966	"He's a Jolly Good Fellow"	39		Wine, Women and Walker
1966	"The Man in the Little White Suit"	37		Wine, Women and Walker
1966	"Little Old Wine Drinker"			Wine, Women and Walker
1966	"Daddy's Coming Home (Next Week)"	56		singles only
1966	"I'm Gonna Hang Up My Gloves"	65		singles only
1967	"The Town That Never Sleeps"	38		singles only
1967	"Don't Squeeze My Sharmon"	8		Don't Squeeze My Sharmon
1967	"I Wouldn't Take Her to a Dogfight"	33		Don't Squeeze My Sharmon
1968	"Truck Drivin' Cat with Nine Wives"	54		singles only
1968	"San Diego"	31	28	singles only
1969	"Honky-Tonk Season"	52		Recorded Live in Dallas, Texas
1969	"Moffett, Oklahoma"	44		Recorded Live in Dallas, Texas
1970	"Honky Tonk Women"	56		Honky Tonkin'
1970	"Let's Go Fishin' Boys (The Girls Are Bitin')"	52		Honky Tonkin'
1970	"God Save the Queen (Of the Honky Tonks)"			Honky Tonkin'
1971	"My Baby Used to Be That Way"	71		Honky Tonkin'
1971	"Wild Women"			single only
1972	"I Don't Mind Goin' Under (If It'll Get Me Over You)"	74		I Don't Mind Goin' Under
1973	"Soft Lips and Hard Liquor"	65	81	Break Out the Bottle / Bring On the Music
1973	"Gonna Drink Milwaukee Dry"			Break Out the Bottle / Bring On the Music
1974	"Wanting My Women Again"			singles only
1974	"Odds and Ends (Bits and Pieces)"	66		singles only
1975	"Say You're Gone"			singles only
1977	"Deep Water"			singles only
1977	"I've Had a Beautiful Time"			singles only
1978	"T for Texas"			singles only
1978	"Red Skies Over Georgia"			singles only
1978	"My Shoes Keep Walkin' Back to You"			singles only
1979	"Don't Sing a Song About Texas"			Texas Gold

== Bibliography ==
- Pugh, Ronnie (1998). "Charlie Walker". In The Encyclopedia of Country Music. Paul Kingsbury, Editor. New York: Oxford University Press. p. 567. ISBN 978-0195395631
