= Pick Me Up on Your Way Down =

Single by Charlie Walker

from the album Greatest Hits
- B-side: "Two Empty Arms"
- Released: 1958
- Recorded: 1958
- Genre: Country
- Length: 2:25
- Label: Columbia
- Songwriter: Harlan Howard

Charlie Walker singles chronology
"Take My Hand" (1957)	"Pick Me Up on Your Way Down" (1958)	"I'll Catch You When You Fall" (1959)

"Pick Me Up on Your Way Down" is a song written by Harlan Howard, originally sung by Charlie Walker, and released on the Columbia label.

Harlan Howard, while living in a frame house in Gardena, California, played the song for another songwriter, Lance Guynes. Guynes offered to send the song to Nashville, and shortly thereafter, Howard received a call from Ray Price saying he loved the song. Conflict arose between Price, Ernest Tubb, and Charlie Walker over who would get to record the song. They ultimately agreed to give it to Walker, "because he needed a hit."

In October 1958, the song peaked at number two on Billboard's weekly country and western chart. It spent 22 weeks on the charts and was also ranked number 44 on Billboard's 1958 year-end country and western chart.

== See also ==
- Billboard year-end top 50 country and western singles of 1958
