= Buddy Alan =

American country music artist (born 1948)

- Birth name: Alan Edgar Owens
- Born: May 23, 1948 (age 77); Mesa, Arizona, United States
- Genres: Country
- Occupation: Singer
- Instrument: Vocals
- Years active: 1968–1978
- Labels: Capitol

Alan Edgar "Buddy" Owens (born May 23, 1948 in Mesa, Arizona), known professionally as Buddy Alan, is an American former country music artist. The son of Buck Owens and Bonnie Owens and stepson of Merle Haggard, Alan recorded four albums for Capitol Records in the 1970s. He also charted eight singles in the Top 40 on the Billboard country charts, including his No. 7 debut single "Let the World Keep On A-Turnin'", a duet with Buck.

== Biography ==
Alan Edgar Owens was born May 22, 1948, in Mesa, Arizona, to country music artist Buck Owens and his then-wife, Bonnie Owens. He founded a rock band called the Chosen Few at age 14 before turning his interests to country music. When Bonnie Owens divorced Buck and married Merle Haggard, Alan moved to Arizona with his mother and new stepfather.

Crediting himself as Buddy Alan, he charted for the first time in 1968 with "Let the World Keep On A-Turnin'", a duet with Buck Owens that reached Top Ten on the country charts. This was followed by "When I Turn Twenty-One", which Haggard co-wrote. Alan toured with his father (who also worked as his promoter) and released an album entitled Wild, Free and Twenty One, in addition to making appearances on Hee Haw. Later on, he charted again in the Top 20 with "Cowboy Convention", a duet with Owens' guitarist Don Rich, and earned a Most Promising Male Artist award from the Academy of Country Music. He continued to chart into the 1970s, but retired from the music business in 1978 to attend college. After that, he became a music director at local radio stations, and was voted four times as Billboard Music Director of the Year.

== Discography ==
=== Albums ===
Year	Album	Chart Positions
Year	Album	US Country
1968	Wild, Free and Twenty-One	—
1970	A Whole Lot of Something	—
1971	We're Real Good Friends (with Don Rich)	36
1972	Too Old to Cut the Mustard? (with Buck Owens)	35
1972	The Best of Buddy Alan	43
1975	Chains / Another Saturday Night	—

=== Singles ===
Year	Single	Chart Positions		Album
Year	Single	US Country	CAN Country	Album
1968	"Let the World Keep On A-Turnin'" (with Buck Owens)	7	36	I've Got You on My Mind Again
1968	"When I Turn Twenty-One"	54	—	Wild, Free and Twenty-One
1969	"Lodi"	23	19	Wild, Free and Twenty-One
1970	"Big Mama's Medicine Show"	23	9	Wild, Free and Twenty-One
1970	"Down in New Orleans"	38	—	A Whole Lot of Something
1970	"Santo Domingo"	57	—	A Whole Lot of Something
1970	"Cowboy Convention" (with Don Rich)	19	—	We're Real Good Friends
1971	"Lookin' Out My Back Door"	37	—	single only
1971	"I'm On the Road to Memphis" (with Don Rich)	54	—	We're Real Good Friends
1971	"Fishin' On the Mississippi"	48	—	singles only
1971	"I Will Drink Your Wine"	46	—	singles only
1971	"Too Old to Cut the Mustard" (with Buck Owens)	29	26	Too Old to Cut the Mustard?
1972	"White Line Fever"	68	—	singles only
1972	"I'm in Love"	47	—	singles only
1972	"Things"	49	—	singles only
1972	"Move It On Over"	60	—	singles only
1973	"Why, Because I Love You"	64	—	singles only
1973	"Caribbean"	67	86	singles only
1973	"Summer Afternoons"	68	—	singles only
1973	"All Around Cowboy of 1964"	67	—	Chains / Another Saturday Night
1974	"I Never Had It So Good"	70	—	Chains / Another Saturday Night
1975	"Chains"	35	—	Chains / Another Saturday Night
1975	"Another Saturday Night"	88	—	Chains / Another Saturday Night

== Awards and nominations ==
Year	Organization	Award	Nominee/Work	Result
1970	Academy of Country Music Awards	Most Promising Male Vocalist	Buddy Alan	Nominated
1971	Academy of Country Music Awards	Most Promising Male Vocalist	Buddy Alan	Won
