= Buck Owens (1960 album) =

Studio album by Buck Owens
- Released: 1960
- Genre: Country
- Label: La Brea L-8017
- Producer: Virginia Richmond

Buck Owens chronology
Buck Owens (1960)	Buck Owens (1961)

Buck Owens is the debut album by Buck Owens, released in 1960. It was released on the La Brea label. His debut on Capitol Records the next year would also be titled Buck Owens.

== Track listing ==
1. "Country Girl"
2. "Down on the Corner of Love"
3. "The House Down the Block"
4. "You're fer Me"
5. "Blue Love"
6. "Right After the Dance"
7. "It Don't Show on Me"
8. "Please Don't Take Her From Me"
9. "Three Dimension Love"
10. "Why Don't My Mommy Stay with My Daddy and Me?"
11. "I'm Gonna Blow"
12. "When I Hold You"
13. "Higher, Higher and Higher"
14. "I Will Always Love You, Darlin'"
