= Jana Jae =

American country and bluegrass fiddler (born 1943)

- Born: August 30, 1943 (age 82)
- Genres: Country
- Occupation: Fiddler
- Instrument: Fiddle
- Years active: 1970s–present
- Website: www.janajae.com

Jana Jae (born August 30, 1943) is an American country and bluegrass fiddler.

== Early life and education ==
She started playing when she was two and a half years old. Both of her parents were violin students at the Juilliard School in New York, and her maternal grandfather was a country fiddler. In her youth, Jae won scholarships to Interlochen and the International String Congress. She graduated magna cum laude with a degree in music and studied abroad at the Vienna Academy of Music.

== Career ==
She gained national fame by appearing on the nationally broadcast CBS/syndicated television series Hee Haw as part of Buck Owens's band in the 1970s. Prior to her work with Owens, she won the Ladies' Division National Fiddling Championship. Her trademark is playing a blue fiddle.

Since the late 1970s, Jae has continued performing internationally, both as the leader of her band, and with orchestra. Additionally, she has appeared with such country music artists as Mel Tillis, Ricky Skaggs, Chet Atkins, Roy Clark, Ray Stevens, The Oakridge Boys, and the Nitty Gritty Dirt Band.

Jae also organizes an annual fiddle camp and fiddle festival in Grove, Oklahoma.

== Personal life ==
Jae was married in 1964 to Sidney Greif. They had two children, Matthew and Sydni.

In 1977, Jae married Buck Owens. She had been playing in his band, the Buckaroos, for several years. Jae and Owens were married for only a few days before Owens filed for annulment. However, Owens changed his mind and the couple had an off-and-on relationship for an additional year before a divorce was finalized.

Her third marriage, in 1982, was to Tony Solow.
