= Willie Cantu =

American drummer

- Born: 1946 or 1947
- Genres: Bakersfield sound; Country music; Rockabilly
- Instrument: Drums
- Years active: 1964–1967
- Formerly of: The Buckaroos

Willie Cantu (born 1946 or 1947) is an American drummer. He was the original drummer for the country music band The Buckaroos from 1964 until 1967. He joined the United States Armed Forces in 1968.

== Career ==
In January 1964, Cantu joined the county music band The Buckaroos at the age of seventeen by auditioning, and played with the band for the first time in Redding, California. On stage he was known as "Wonderful Willie." Cantu, along with Doyle Holly are credited with giving the Buck Owens-led band its rock music energy, making the band's sound more lively than the Nashville sound that was common in country music at the time. He was the band's youngest member and Owens "aged" him three years in band publications.

In May 1967, Cantu quit the band, seeking a new challenge, before signing up for the United States Armed Forces. He was replaced by Jerry Wiggins, in 1968.

By 2009, Cantu was the only surviving original member of the band.

== Family life ==
Cantu was born Guillermo Cantu in Corpus Christi, Texas 1946 or 1947, to Trina Parra and Manuel José Cantu. He has one sibling, a sister.

He married his first wife Geraldine when he was eighteen years old.
