= Foolin' Around (Buck Owens song) =

Single by Buck Owens

from the album Buck Owens Sings Harlan Howard
- A-side: "High as the Mountains"
- Released: January 1961
- Recorded: 1960
- Genre: Country
- Length: 2:37
- Label: Capitol
- Songwriters: Buck Owens; Harlan Howard
- Producer: Ken Nelson

Buck Owens singles chronology
"Excuse Me (I Think I've Got a Heartache)" (1960)	"Foolin' Around" (1961)	"Under the Influence of Love" (1961)

"Foolin' Around" is a song co-written and recorded by American country music artist Buck Owens. The song peaked at number 2 on the U.S. Billboard Hot Country Singles chart.

== Chart performance ==
Chart (1961)	Peak position
U.S. Billboard Hot Country Singles	2
U.S. Billboard Bubbling Under Hot 100	13
