= Doyle Holly =

American singer-songwriter

Background information
- Born: Doyle Floyd Hendricks; June 30, 1936; Perkins, Oklahoma, US
- Origin: Bakersfield, California, US
- Died: January 13, 2007 (aged 70) Nashville, Tennessee, US
- Genres: Country, rockabilly, Bakersfield Sound
- Occupations: Musician, songwriter
- Instruments: Bass guitar, rhythm guitar
- Years active: 1961–2006
- Labels: Capitol, Barnaby, OMS Records
- Website: www.doyleholly.com

Doyle Floyd Hendricks (June 30, 1936 – January 13, 2007), known by the stage name Doyle Holly, was an American musician best known as the bass guitar player of the country music band Buck Owens and the Buckaroos and for his solo hit songs "Queen Of The Silver Dollar" and "Lila". Holly's contributions on bass guitar and rhythm guitar were a key component of the Bakersfield sound. The Buckaroos had more than 30 Top 40 singles on the country music charts in the 1960s and early 1970s, with 21 number one hits such as "I've Got a Tiger By the Tail," "Love's Gonna Live Here,"and "Act Naturally." Their sound influenced later artists such as Creedence Clearwater Revival, Jackson Browne, The Eagles, The Derailers and the Desert Rose Band.

== Early life ==
Holly was born in Perkins, Oklahoma. As a young man, he spent four years in the United States Army and worked in oil fields in Oklahoma, Kansas, and California. He eventually made his way to Bakersfield, California, where he discovered the country and rock music scene in the area. He began to play guitar and bass in local clubs at night while working in the oil fields during the day. In the early 1960s Holly played with Johnny Burnette, toured the rodeo circuit with a pre-Hawaii Five-O Jack Lord, and appeared with several country and rock bands and artists.

== The Buckaroos ==
Holly was playing with Joe Maphis in 1963 when he was asked by Don Rich to fill in as bassist for the Buckaroos. The spot became his permanently after Merle Haggard left the group, and the Buckaroos began their most creative and successful period, from 1963 to 1971. The group had more than 30 singles in the country music top 40 in that time, of which more than half went to No. 1. "Act Naturally," a No. 1 single for the Buckaroos in 1963, was covered by The Beatles on their 1965 album Help! Other hits included "I've Got A Tiger By The Tail," "Together Again," and "Love's Gonna Live Here," which occupied the top position on the country chart for 17 weeks near the end of 1963.

The Buckaroos recorded a live album, Carnegie Hall Concert in 1966, which Holly said was his favorite recording as a Buckaroo. At the time, it was only the second album recorded at Carnegie Hall by a country music group, and it is widely regarded as one of the best live albums in country music history. The fans showed up at the Carnegie Hall Concert in New York City in their tuxedos and evening gowns. The concert had been oversold and the venue was packed with fans, many sitting in the aisles. During the Carnegie Hall concert, the Buckaroos returned a favor to The Beatles and played "Twist and Shout" while wearing Beatles wigs.

Holly and the Buckaroos toured widely in North America and Europe in the 1960s. During the band's peak of popularity in the mid to late 1960s, it seemed like everyone was a Buckaroos fan including the Beatles, who, it is said, had a standing order for all new Buck Owens and the Buckaroos records to be forwarded to them in England. While on tour in London in 1969, Holly, Owens and Don Rich met up John Lennon and Ringo Starr. Holly recorded seven albums with The Buckaroos from 1968-1970 without Buck Owens, all of which were chart topping records. The Buckaroos albums contained instrumentals along with Holly and Don Rich sharing the role of lead vocalists, each having solo songs on every album. The band won a number of awards, including Grammys and CMAs (Country Music Awards). While Holly was with The Buckaroos they were nominated as "Band Of The Year" seven consecutive years from the Academy of Country Music from 1965 to 1971, winning the award four years in a row from 1965-1968. They were also nominated as "Instrumental Group of the Year" for five consecutive years from 1967-1971 by the Country Music Awards, winning twice in 1967 and 1968.

In 1968, Buck Owens and the Buckaroos recorded a live album when they performed at the White House for President Lyndon Johnson. They served as the house band for the American television variety show Hee Haw, and for Owens' syndicated television show, Buck Owens Ranch House, from 1966 to 1972. Holly was nominated several times as "Bass Player of the Year" award from the Academy of Country Music, and he received the award in 1970.

== Solo years ==
In 1971, Holly left the Buckaroos, stating, "(I) went just as far as I could go" with the Buckaroos. He formed a band called the Vanishing Breed and signed with Andy Williams' label Barnaby Records. He recorded two albums and some of his own songs, such as "Woman Truck Drivin' Fool", "Queen of the Silver Dollar", and "Lila". Seven singles hit the country music charts, of which "Lila" made the most successful peak at No. 17 in 1973. Holly continued to record and release singles throughout the 1970s and scored a minor hit with "A Rainbow in My Hand" and a jukebox hit "Richard and the Cadillac Kings." Holly is honored in the Rockabilly Hall of Fame and received a block in the Walkway of Stars at the Country Music Hall of Fame in 1980.

Holly tired of life on the road in the early 1980s and opened a music store, "Doyle Holly Music" in Hendersonville, Tennessee in 1982, which he operated for nearly two decades and sold a few years before his death. He also continued to play a handful of live dates across the United States and Canada, and for a time Holly even drove tour buses, for an Elton John/Billy Joel tour and for Shania Twain.

In 2000 Owens, Holly, Johnny Russell, and the remaining Buckaroos (Rich died in a motorcycle accident in 1974) began to record a bluegrass-influenced album of Buckaroo hits, with Holly on vocals. The project was about two-thirds complete when Russell's health failed, and production stalled after his death soon afterward. The project was finally completed in 2003.

Holly was hospitalized in December 2006 for treatment of end-stage prostate cancer. He entered a Nashville hospice in January 2007 and died on January 13 at his home in Nashville.

== Discography ==
=== Albums ===
| Year | Album | US Country | Label |
|---|---|---|---|
| 1973 | Doyle Holly | 43 | Barnaby |
| 1974 | Just Another Cowboy Song | 31 | Barnaby |
| 1981 | Doyle Holly Sings Just For You | | Karavan |
| 2003 | Together Again | — | OMS |

=== Singles ===
| Year | Single | Chart positions | | Album |
| Year | Single | US Country | CAN Country | Album |
|---|---|---|---|---|
| 1972 | "My Heart Cries for You" | 63 | — | Doyle Holly |
| 1973 | "Queen of the Silver Dollar" | 29 | 37 | Doyle Holly |
| 1973 | "Lila" | 17 | 12 | Just Another Cowboy Song |
| 1974 | "Lord How Long Has This Been Going On" (with The Vanishing Breed) | 58 | 90 | Just Another Cowboy Song |
| 1974 | "A Rainbow in My Hand" | 75 | — | single only |
| 1974 | "Just Another Cowboy Song" | 69 | — | Just Another Cowboy Song |
| 1974 | "Richard and the Cadillac Kings" | 53 | — | singles only |
| 1974 | "Funky Water" | — | — | singles only |

== Buckaroo albums ==
- Strike Again
- A Night On The Town
- Meanwhile, Back At The Ranch
- Anywhere U.S.A
- Roll Your Own
- Rompin' And Stompin'
- Boot Hill
