= Excuse Me (I Think I've Got a Heartache) =

Single by Buck Owens

from the album Buck Owens
- B-side: "I've Got a Right to Know"
- Released: August 1, 1960
- Recorded: 1960
- Genre: Country
- Length: 2:25
- Label: Capitol
- Songwriters: Buck Owens; Harlan Howard

Buck Owens singles chronology
"Above and Beyond" (1960)	"Excuse Me (I Think I've Got a Heartache)" (1960)	"Foolin' Around" (1961)

"Excuse Me (I Think I've Got a Heartache)" is a song co-written and recorded by American country music artist Buck Owens. The song peaked at number 2 on the U.S. Billboard Hot Country Singles chart.

== Chart performance ==
Chart (1960)	Peak position
U.S. Billboard Hot Country Singles	2
