= Harlan Howard =

American country music songwriter (1927–2002)

- Born: Harlan Perry Howard; September 8, 1927; Detroit, Michigan, U.S.
- Died: March 3, 2002 (aged 74) Nashville, Tennessee, U.S.
- Genres: Country
- Occupation: Songwriter
- Years active: 1958–1997
- Labels: Capitol; RCA; Monument; Nugget

Harlan Perry Howard (September 8, 1927 – March 3, 2002) was an American songwriter, principally in country music. In a career spanning six decades, Howard is credited with writing more than 4,000 songs, over 100 of which reached country music's Top 10.

== Career ==
Howard was born on September 8, 1927, in Detroit, Michigan, and grew up on a farm in Michigan. As a child, he listened to the Grand Ole Opry radio show. In later years, Howard recalled the personal formative influence of country music:

I was captured by the songs as much as the singer. They grabbed my heart. The reality of country music moved me. Even when I was a kid, I liked the sad songs… songs that talked about true life. I recognized this music as a simple plea. It beckoned me.

Howard completed only nine years of formal education, though he was an avid reader. When he was 12 years of age, he began writing songs, "an enthusiasm fueled by an appetite for books and an ear for a telling phrase."

After serving as a paratrooper with the United States Army, he went to Los Angeles, California, hoping to sell his music.

Howard did manual labor while writing songs and pushing his finished material. Eventually, he sold some of his compositions and, after a few minor successes, his song, "Pick Me Up on Your Way Down", recorded by Charlie Walker, went to No. 2 on the country music chart in late 1958. A year later Ray Price had a major country hit with "Heartaches By The Number". Simultaneously, a pop version of the song performed by Guy Mitchell went to No. 1 on the pop chart. Buoyed by these two major hits, Howard moved to Nashville, Tennessee, in 1960. Bringing along a large portfolio of compositions, he signed a contract with Acuff-Rose Music. Howard's songs were so immediately successful that, in 1961 alone, he had fifteen of his compositions on the country music chart, earning him ten BMI awards. Among his biggest hits was "I Fall to Pieces", co-written with Hank Cochran and recorded by Patsy Cline. Cline and Candi Staton recorded his "He Called Me Baby", which was later a No. 1 C&W hit for Charlie Rich as "She Called Me Baby".

Though not often thought of as a writer of rhythm and blues songs, Howard wrote Joe Simon's No. 1 R&B chart hit "The Chokin' Kind", a million-selling record in 1969.

Howard also wrote the classic Kingston Trio song "Everglades", and the song "Busted", originally a hit for both Ray Charles and Johnny Cash and later a hit for John Conlee, who used the song to create awareness for Feed the Children. The song "The Wall" also became a hit for Johnny Cash on his studio album Orange Blossom Special, as well as his Live at Folsom Prison album.

Howard coined the oft-quoted phrase defining a great country song as Three Chords and the Truth.

Howard was inducted into the Nashville Songwriters Hall of Fame in 1973, the Country Music Hall of Fame in 1997, and the Songwriters Hall of Fame also in 1997. He died in Nashville in 2002, at the age of 74, and was buried in Nashville City Cemetery.

On March 3, 2023, Willie Nelson released his 73rd studio album I Don't Know A Thing About Love: The Songs of Harlan Howard. Produced by Buddy Cannon, the album is a tribute to Harlan Howard.

== Discography ==
- 1961: Harlan Howard Sings Harlan Howard
- 1965: All Time Favorite Country Songwriter
- 1967: Mr. Songwriter
- 1967: Down to Earth
- 1971: To the Silent Majority with Love
- 1981: Singer and Songwriter

== Song list ==
Songs written or co-written by Harlan Howard.

- "Above and Beyond (the Call of Love)"
- "Blame It on Your Heart" (co-written with Kostas)
- "The Blizzard"
- "Busted"
- "Chokin' Kind"
- "Call Me Mr. In-Between"
- "Don't Call Me From a Honky Tonk Bar"
- "Don't Tell Me What To Do (I'll Love You Forever If I Want To)" (co-written with Max D. Barnes)
- "Everglades"
- "Evil off My Mind"
- "Evil on Your Mind"
- "Excuse Me (I Think I've Got a Heartache)" (co-written with Buck Owens)
- "Foolin' Round" (co-written with Buck Owens)
- "He/She Called Me Baby"
- "She's Gone, Gone, Gone"
- "Heartaches by the Number"
- "Heartbreak U.S.A."
- "Hurtin's All Over"
- "I Don't Believe I'll Fall in Love Today"
- "I Don't Know a Thing About Love (The Moon Song)"
- "I Don't Remember Loving You" (co-written with Robert Braddock)
- "I Fall to Pieces"
- "I Wish I Could Fall in Love Today"
- "I Won't Forget You"
- "It's All Over" (co-written with Jan Howard)
- "I've Got a Tiger By the Tail" (co-written with Buck Owens)
- "The Key's in the Mailbox"
- "Life Turned Her That Way"
- "Mommy For a Day" (co-written with Buck Owens)
- "No Charge"
- "Odds And Ends"
- "Pick Me Up on Your Way Down"
- "Sally Was a Good Old Girl"
- "Say it Isn't So" (co-written with Nanci Griffith)
- "Second Hand Rose" (co-written with Grant Clarke and James Hanley)
- "She's a Little Bit Country"
- "Somebody Should Leave" (co-written with Chick Rains)
- "Someone Had to Teach You" ( co-written with Bill Hervey)<George Strait, Livin' It Up, 1990></Wade Hayes, Old Enough to Know Better, 1994>
- "Somewhere Tonight" (co-written with Rodney Crowell)
- "Streets of Baltimore" (co-written with Tompall Glaser)
- "These Lips Don't Know How to Say Goodbye"
- "Three Steps to the Phone (Millions Of Miles)"
- "Time Won't Tell" (co-written with Beth Nielsen Chapman)
- "Too Many Rivers"
- "Under The Influence Of Love" (co-written with Buck Owens)
- "What A Merry Christmas This Could Be"
- "Why Not Me" (co-written with Brent Maher and Sonny Throckmorton)
- "You Comb Her Hair" (co-written with Hank Cochran)
- "You Took Him Off My Hands (Now Please Take Him Off My Mind)" (co-written with Skeets McDonald and Wynn Stewart)
- "Your Heart Turned Left and I Went Right"
- "Yours Love"

== Personal life ==
Howard was married numerous times, including to country singer Jan Howard.

== See also ==
- Waylon Sings Ol' Harlan
- Buck Owens Sings Harlan Howard
- I Don't Know A Thing About Love: The Songs of Harlan Howard
