= The Buckaroos =

American band; Grammy-winning band led by Buck Owens

- Origin: Bakersfield, California, United States
- Genres: Bakersfield sound, country, rockabilly
- Years active: 1963–2005
- Label: Capitol Records
- Past members: Buck Owens; Don Rich; Doyle Holly; Tom Brumley; Willie Cantu; Merle Haggard; Wayne Wilson; Jana Jae; Victoria Hallman; Connie Bonar; Jesse Rose McQueen; Jerry Wiggins; Jerry Brightman; Doyle Curtsinger; Ronnie Jackson; Jim Shaw; JayDee Maness; Wayne "Moose" Stone; Jay McDonald; Ken Presley; Terry Christoffersen; Jim McCarty; James Harold Brown; David Wulfekuehler; Brian Coll; Kim Maccabee; Chuck Seaton; Drew Harness

The Buckaroos were an American music band led by Buck Owens in the 1960s and early 1970s, who, along with Merle Haggard's The Strangers, were involved in the development and presentation of the "Bakersfield sound". Their peak of success was from 1965 to 1970. In 2005, CMT named the Buckaroos No. 2 on its list of the 20 Greatest Country Music Bands.

== History ==
Don Rich, Doyle Holly, Tom Brumley and Willie Cantu were the original members of the Buckaroos during the 1960s. The 1970s version included Don Rich, Jerry Wiggins, Jerry Brightman, Doyle Curtsinger, and Jim Shaw. Various sidemen throughout the years included JayDee Maness, Wayne "Moose" Stone, Jay McDonald, Ken Presley, and very early on, Merle Haggard. Haggard, who worked a short time with Owens in 1962, suggested the group's name. Fiddle player Jana Jae became the group's first female member after being invited onstage with Buck Owens to play "Orange Blossom Special". Vocalist Victoria Hallman (a.k.a. Jesse Rose McQueen) toured with the Buckaroos, sang with them on Hee Haw and recorded one Buck Owens record "Let Jesse Rob the Train" with the group. Drummer/singer Rick Taylor replaced Jerry Wiggins in 1978, when he left the band to manage his wife, Susan Raye. Rick performed his first appearance at the Golden Nugget in Las Vegas "winging it" as there was no time for rehearsals before the sold-out performances. Rick had seen Buck and the original Buckaroos live in Omaha when he was 13 years old and dreamed of performing with Buck on Hee Haw. At age 19 he made his way to Nashville and 5 years later, he was performing in a rock cover group at a Nashville night club when Buck himself came to watch him at the urging of Hee Haw music director, Charlie McCoy, and Hee Haw staff band players, Leon Rhodes, and Tommy Williams. Buck hired Rick on the spot and invited him to the Hee Haw set the next day where his dream became a reality. Rick's first taping was the Hee Haw 10th Anniversary Show taped at the Grand Ole Opry House in Nashville in October 1978. He was with the Buckaroos until leaving in 1981, following the band's nomination and win as "Touring Band of the Year" at the ACM Awards, to join the Epic Records vocal group Nightstreets, voted Billboard Magazine's Vocal Group of the Year 1981 for the single, "Love In The Meantime". Nightstreets featured female vocalist, Joyce Hawthorne, met Rick while recording as a background singer with the Buckaroos in the 1970s. Nightstreets toured with George Jones and Tammy Wynette from 1981 through 1982. Rick retired from the music industry in 1986.

Known for their signature red, white and blue colored guitars and fiddles, the Buckaroos in 1966 became only the second country music band to appear at Carnegie Hall in New York City. The recording of this performance, released as Carnegie Hall Concert, is considered one of the greatest live country music albums. They also recorded and released live albums from appearances in London, Norway, Australia, New Zealand, and Las Vegas. The Buckaroos also appeared on the Buck Owens Show.

The Buckaroos recorded eight albums from 1967 to 1970, all of which were top sellers. They also earned numerous awards, including Grammys. They were nominated as "Band Of The Year" by the Academy of Country Music in eight consecutive years, winning the award four times, 1965–1968. The Buckaroos were also nominated as "Instrumental Group of the Year" in the Country Music Awards for five consecutive years, 1967–1971, winning the honor in 1967 and 1968.

In 1970, Doyle Holly received "Bass Player of the Year" award from the Academy of Country Music as a member of the Buckaroos. He left the group the next year to pursue a solo career, in which he released two Top 20 hit albums. He is honored in the Rockabilly Hall of Fame and received a block in the walkway of stars at the Country Music Hall of Fame in 1980. Holly died in 2007.

Tom Brumley left the Buckaroos in 1969 to join Ricky Nelson's band, where he was a member for over a decade. His performance on "Together Again" has been considered "one of the finest steel guitar solos in the history of country music." His unique steel guitar sound was known as "The Brumley Touch", and he was recognized by the Academy of Country Music as the top steel guitarist. He was inducted into both the Texas Steel Guitar Hall of Fame and the International Steel Guitar Hall of Fame. Brumley died in 2009.

Don Rich died in a motorcycle accident in 1974. At the time Rich was the only original member still with the Buckaroos and the band was struggling to find their way back at the top of the Country Music Charts. His death marked the end of the Buckaroos reign as the top Country Music band.

Jerry Brightman left in 1975 and migrated into the business side with his involvement with WWVA Jamboree and Jamboree in the Hills.

== Members ==
- Jerry Brightman (pedal steel)
- Tom Brumley (pedal steel)
- Willie Cantu (drums)
- Merle Haggard (bass)
- Toby Minter (drums)
- Doyle Holly (bass)
- Jana Jae (fiddle)
- Mel King (drums)
- Jay McDonald (pedal steel)
- JayDee Maness (pedal steel)
- Kenny Pierce
- Ken Presley (drums)
- Don Rich (guitar, fiddle, vocals)
- Jim Shaw (keyboards, vocals)
- Ronnie Jackson (guitar, banjo)
- Doyle Curtsinger (bass, vocals)
- Wayne "Moose" Stone (drums)
- Jerry Wiggins (drums)
- Rick Taylor (drums, vocals)
- Wayne Wilson (bass)
- Terry Christoffersen (pedal steel, guitar, banjo, dobro, vocals)
- Connie Bonar (fiddle)
- Don Lee (guitar, vocals)
- David Wulfekuehler (drums)
- Buck Dupree
- Fred Gates (pedal steel)
- Bob Morris (songwriter/guitar)
- James Harold Brown (guitar)
- Bob Baty (guitar)
- Victoria Hallman (vocals)
- Kim Maccabee (vocals)
- Chuck Seaton (guitar, vocals)
- Drew Harness (guitar, vocals)

== Discography ==
=== Albums ===
Year	Album	US Country	Label
1966	The Buck Owens Song Book	10	Capitol
1967	America's Most Wanted Band	12	Capitol
1967	The Buck Owens' Buckaroos Strike Again!	11	Capitol
1968	A Night on the Town with Buck Owens' Buckaroos	32	Capitol
1968	Meanwhile Back at the Ranch	34	Capitol
1969	Anywhere U.S.A.	35	Capitol
1969	Roll Your Own with Buck Owens' Buckaroos	45	Capitol
1970	Rompin' and Stompin'	—	Capitol
1970	Boot Hill	—	Capitol
1971	That Fiddlin' Man	—	Capitol
1971	The Buckaroos Play the Hits	—	Capitol
1971	Songs of Merle Haggard Played by the Buckaroos	—	Capitol
2000	Country Pickin': The Don Rich Anthology	—	Sundazed
2007	The Best of the Buckaroos	—	Sundazed

=== Singles ===
Year	Single	Chart positions		Album
Year	Single	US Country	CAN Country	Album
1967	"Chicken Pickin'"	69	—	The Buck Owens' Buckaroos Strike Again!
1968	"I'm Coming Back Home to Stay"	38	11	A Night on the Town with Buck Owens' Buckaroos
1968	"I'm Goin' Back Home Where I Belong"	50	—	Meanwhile Back at the Ranch
1969	"Anywhere U.S.A."	63	—	Anywhere U.S.A.
1969	"Nobody but You"	43	—	Roll Your Own with Buck Owens' Buckaroos
1969	"Natural Born Loser"	—	—	Roll Your Own with Buck Owens' Buckaroos
1970	"The Night They Drove Old Dixie Down"	71	—	Rompin' and Stompin'
1970	"Cinderella"	—	—	Rompin' and Stompin'
1970	"Country Pickin'"	—	—	Rompin' and Stompin'
1970	"Up on Cripple Creek"	—	—	Boot Hill
