= Don Rich =

American country musician (1941–1974)

- Rich, c. early 1970s

Background information
- Born: Donald Eugene Ulrich; August 15, 1941; Olympia, Washington, U.S.
- Died: July 17, 1974 (aged 32) San Luis Obispo, California, U.S.
- Genre: Country
- Occupation: Musician
- Instruments: Guitar, fiddle, vocals
- Years active: 1959–1974

Donald Eugene Ulrich (August 15, 1941 – July 17, 1974), best known by the stage name Don Rich, was an American country musician who helped develop the Bakersfield sound in the early 1960s. He was a noted guitarist and fiddler, and a member of The Buckaroos, the backing band of his best friend, country singer Buck Owens. Rich was killed in a motorcycle accident in 1974 at the age of 32.

== Early life and career ==
Donald Eugene Ulrich was born in Olympia, Washington, on August 15, 1941. The adopted son of Bill and Anne Ulrich, he grew up in nearby Tumwater, living at 6th and Ferry on Tumwater Hill, then later in a log house near Trosper Road and Capitol Blvd., next to his father's barbering business. His parents taught Rich the fiddle as early as age 3; his father built a small-scale violin for him. His parents entered Rich in numerous talent contests, and he played at various events. He also began playing the guitar at an early age.

While attending Olympia High School (from which he graduated in 1959), Rich played at various local venues including with the high-school orchestra. In September 1957, at age 16, he opened for Elvis Presley at the Tacoma Lincoln Bowl. He formed a rock-and-roll band called the Blue Comets with his friends, drummer Greg Hawkins and pianist Steve Anderson. By 1958, Rich was playing regularly at Steve's Gay '90s Restaurant in South Tacoma. Buck Owens, who was living in Tacoma while working at radio station KAYE, attended one of his shows and immediately went to speak with him; Rich was soon playing fiddle with Owens at local venues. They were featured on the weekly BAR-K Jamboree on KTNT-TV 11, where Loretta Lynn was a guest with them for her television debut. Soon after, Owens' "Under Your Spell Again" made it to No. 4 on the country music charts, and he returned to Bakersfield, California, to do more recording for Capitol Records.

Owens tried to convince Rich to come with him to Bakersfield, but Rich opted to go to Centralia College, where he was a music tutor but continued playing local venues. While at Centralia, Rich renewed his acquaintance with Marlane Schindler, his future wife. They had met a few years earlier in Morton, a small town in eastern Lewis County.

After a year of college, Rich dropped out and joined Owens in Bakersfield, signing on for $75 a week in December 1960. Rich returned to Washington to escort Marlane to Nevada, where they married. Marlane worked in support of keeping Rich, Owens, and his Buckaroos performing. Don and Marlane had two children, Vic and Vance Ulrich.

== With Buck Owens and the Buckaroos ==
The first single Rich played on was "Above and Beyond," which peaked at No. 3. Owens and Rich toured somewhat haphazardly, throwing Owens' acoustic guitar and Rich's fiddle into the back of Owens' old Ford pickup and hopping from bar to bar, dance hall to dance hall, playing with whomever musicians they could find.

Owens and Rich continued recording singles in Bakersfield. In 1961, "Foolin' Around" spent eight weeks in the No. 2 slot. Up to that point, Owens had stuck to the Texas Shuffle style, with Rich playing the role of the "lonesome fiddler". That sound changed with Owens' 1962 single "You're For Me", a song he had written several years prior. The shuffle on the snare drum moved to a tightly closed high-hat, and the off-beat was accented by an aggressive half-rimshot, half-click on the snare drum. The bass went from upright to electric. Owens dubbed it the "freight train" sound; it is now often referred to as the "Bakersfield sound".

In 1964, for convenience when recording and touring, Owens formed a regular backing band, including drums, bass, and pedal steel, with Rich as the band leader. Owens' old Ford was replaced with a Chevrolet camper. In the early years of the band, members came and went quickly. Alumni included Ken Presley (who died in a car accident while a member), Jay McDonald, Mel King, Wayne Stone, and Merle Haggard. Before leaving the group, Haggard dubbed the band "The Buckaroos", and the name stuck.

In early 1963, the Johnny Russell song "Act Naturally" was pitched to Owens. Owens was initially unimpressed but Rich liked it, and they recorded it with The Buckaroos on February 12, 1963. It was released March 11 and entered the charts on April 13. By June 15, the single began its first of four non-consecutive weeks at the No. 1 position. It was Owens's first top hit.

"Act Naturally" marked Rich's first appearance on lead guitar. Over the years, Owens had taught Rich his guitar style, and by 1963, Rich was mainly playing guitar rather than fiddle, allowing Owens to concentrate on singing and acting as front man.

Owens and Rich followed "Act Naturally" with another 'freight train' rhythm song, "Love's Gonna Live Here", which spent 16 weeks at No. 1.

During the summer of 1963, The Buckaroos' bassist Kenny Pierce walked out on the band during a tour. Rich called in a bass-playing acquaintance named Doyle Holly. Shortly thereafter, steel player Jay McDonald quit and was replaced by Tom Brumley. The classic Buckaroo lineup was in place.

Owens, Rich, and the band recorded two songs to release as a single in late January 1964. One was a fast song titled "My Heart Skips a Beat"; the other was a slow ballad called "Together Again". Rich played an excellent ride on "My Heart Skips a Beat", and Tom Brumley played what has been called one of the greatest steel-guitar solos ever on "Together Again". Both songs shot to No. 1 simultaneously and switched spots multiple times.

Rich hired Willie Cantu, a young Texan, to play drums for The Buckaroos in January 1964. In July of that year, the new band recorded "I Don't Care (Just As Long As You Love Me)". This, too, went to No. 1, and featured another twangy Rich guitar solo.

In 1965, Owens and The Buckaroos scored hits with "I've Got a Tiger by the Tail", "Before You Go" (co-written by Rich), "Only You (Can Break My Heart)", and "Buckaroo", which was the only instrumental ever to go to No. 1 on the country charts.

Around this time, musical equipment manufacturers took notice of The Buckaroo's popularity. The Fender company had already given Buck Owens a golden sparkle Telecaster; now they gave Owens a Fender acoustic, Rich a champagne sparkle Fender Telecaster, and Holly a champagne sparkle Jazz Bass. Cantu received a sparkle drum kit from Rodgers, and Brumley got an 11-string pedal steel from ZB Guitars, which allowed him to play Rich's licks during the choruses of songs, leaving Rich free to harmonize with Buck.

On January 3, 1966, "Waitin' in Your Welfare Line" (written by Owens, Rich, and Nat Stuckey) was released, and went to No. 1. On March 15, Owens and The Buckaroos began filming a half-hour television show called The Buck Owens Ranch Show. The show was filmed and distributed for several years, eventually being canceled because it came into conflict with another Owens project, the TV show Hee Haw.

In late March 1966, the group performed at Carnegie Hall in New York City. The show was recorded live and is considered by many to be one of the finest live country music records of all time. Owens later said that the band was so tight that they did not have to use post-production to fix mistakes as none could be found.

Owens and Rich continued recording, scoring No. 1 hits in 1966 with "Think of Me" (written by Rich and Estella Olson) and "Open Up Your Heart". In late 1966, bassist Holly left for a 9-month period: his spot was filled by Wayne Wilson. Owens and the band scored three No. 1 hits in 1967: "Where Does The Good Times Go?", "Sam's Place", and "Your Tender Loving Care", and they recorded another live album, this time in Japan, which was successful.

In 1968, Owens and Rich began experimenting outside of the 'freight train' sound, but their success continued. "How Long Will My Baby Be Gone?" hit No. 1, and the group recorded a live album at the White House (which was not released until 1972). Owens also signed onto Hee Haw in 1968, with Rich named musical director.

In 1969, Owens and Rich hit No. 1 with both "Who's Gonna Mow Your Grass?" and "Tall Dark Stranger". Rich added an experimental fuzztone guitar part to the former. Hee Haw aired on CBS from 1969 through 1971 and went directly into syndication. It remained a weekly series through the summer of 1992. The Buckaroos served as the house band, and Owens received national exposure on a weekly basis. Another live record, In London, was also recorded in 1969.

Owens and The Buckaroos continued playing, recording, and filming episodes of Hee Haw. The Buckaroos' lineup changed over time until Owens and Rich were the only original members. The pair reached No. 1 for the last time with "Made in Japan", which was released in 1972.

== Death ==
After finishing work at Owens' Bakersfield studio on July 17, 1974, Rich was killed in a motorcycle accident. He had been en route to join his family for vacation on the central coast of California. For unknown reasons, his motorcycle hit a center divider on northbound Highway 1 at Yerba Buena Street in Morro Bay. He was pronounced dead on arrival at Sierra Vista Hospital in San Luis Obispo at 10:55 pm, 50 minutes after the incident was reported. California Highway Patrol officials stated that no skid marks and no apparent mechanical problems were found. Reports indicated that Owens had pleaded with Rich not to take his motorcycle that day and had been pleading with him for years to quit riding.

Owens was devastated by Rich's death and did not discuss it in interviews for years. In a late-1990s interview, Owens said: "He was like a brother, a son, and a best friend. Something I never said before, maybe I couldn't, but I think my music life ended when he died. Oh yeah, I carried on and I existed, but the real joy and love, the real lightning and thunder is gone forever."

Years after Rich's death, Marlane married Larry Dunivent and had two children. She continues to stay involved in Rich's legacy.

== Musical equipment ==
Rich used primarily Fender guitars and amplifiers. In the early days, he played Owens' 1951 Fender Telecaster through a Fender Bassman amplifier. In 1964, Fender gave Owens an endorsement deal and the band gained instruments. Rich received a Telecaster that had both its body and headstock finished in champagne metal flake in addition to having checkerboard binding on both sides of the guitar's body. That finish was somewhat rough because it contained crushed glass. The band also received other Fender amplifiers, so Rich played through a Twin Reverb amplifier.

Rich had a one-off Telecaster-ish Red Mosrite that is in possession of the Owens estate. Owens and Rich received new guitars in 1966, a pair of Silver Flake Telecasters that were double bound in plain black. Also around 1966, Owens had Bakersfield guitar repairman/technic Gene Moles finish another set of guitars in red, white, and blue. Fender also gave Rich a Gold Sparkle Telecaster in the late 1960s that was bound in plain black. It had no finish on the headstock.

Fender's deal with most of their artists was that they would exchange their instruments for new ones every seven years or so. Owens refused to return the instruments given to them, so Fender stopped giving them instruments. Gibson picked up on this, and in the early 1970s, they struck a deal with Owens. Rich received an ES-335 and a Les Paul Professional model. Owens and Rich later went back to playing their red, white, and blue Telecasters.

== Discography ==
=== Albums ===
Year	Album	US Country	Label
1971	We're Real Good Friends (with Buddy Alan)	36	Capitol
2000	Country Pickin': The Don Rich Anthology		Sundazed
2013	Don Rich Sings George Jones		Omnivore
2013	Don Rich and the Buckaroos – That Fiddlin' Man		Omnivore

=== Singles ===
Year	Single	US Country	Album
1970	"Cowboy Convention" (with Buddy Alan)	19	We're Real Good Friends
1971	"I'm on the Road to Memphis" (with Buddy Alan)	54	We're Real Good Friends
