= Buck Owens =

American musician and band leader (1929–2006)

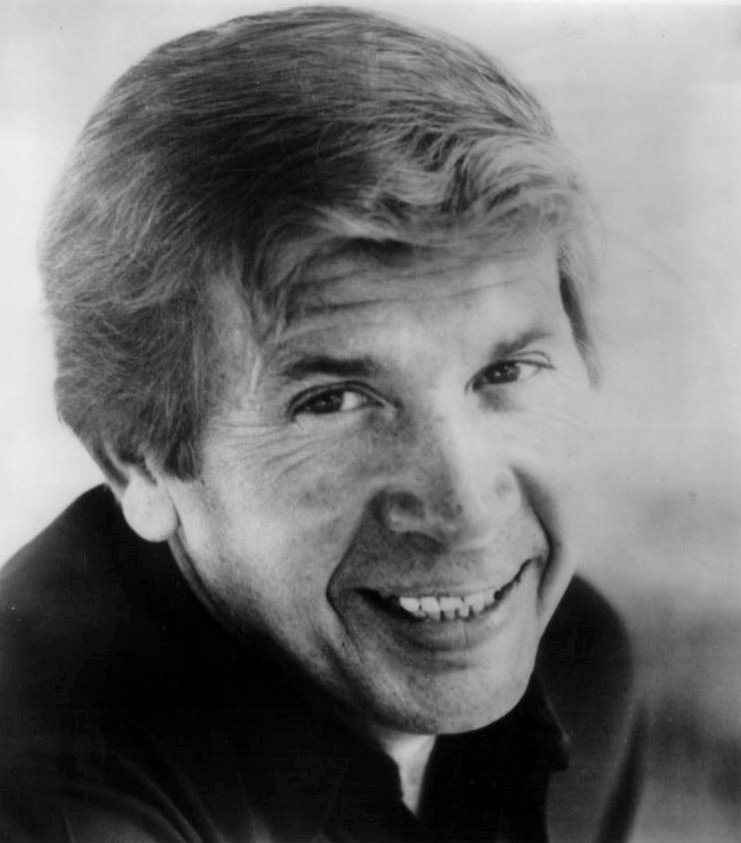
- Warner Brothers Records publicity photo, 1977

Background information
- Born: Alvis Edgar Owens Jr. August 12, 1929; Sherman, Texas, U.S.
- Died: March 25, 2006 (aged 76) Bakersfield, California, U.S.
- Genres: Country; Bakersfield sound
- Occupations: Singer, bandleader, TV host
- Instruments: Vocals; guitar
- Years active: 1945–2006
- Labels: Capitol; Sundazed
- Website: buckowens.com

Alvis Edgar "Buck" Owens Jr. (August 12, 1929 – March 25, 2006) was an American musician, singer, and songwriter. He was the frontman for The Buckaroos, which had 21 No. 1 hits on the Billboard country music chart. He pioneered what came to be called the Bakersfield sound, named in honor of Bakersfield, California, Owens's adopted home and the city from which he drew inspiration for what he preferred to call "American music".

While the Buckaroos originally featured a fiddle and retained pedal steel guitar into the 1970s, their sound on records and onstage was always more stripped-down and elemental. The band's signature style was based on simple story lines, infectious choruses, a twangy electric guitar, an insistent rhythm supplied by a prominent drum track, and high, two-part vocal harmonies featuring Owens and his guitarist Don Rich.

From 1969 to 1986, Owens co-hosted the popular CBS television variety show Hee Haw with Roy Clark (syndicated beginning in 1971). According to Owens's son Buddy Alan, the accidental 1974 death of Don Rich, his closest friend, devastated him for years and impaired his creative efforts until he mounted a comeback in the late 1980s.

Owens is a member of both the Country Music Hall of Fame and Nashville Songwriters Hall of Fame.

== Biography ==
Owens was born August 12, 1929 on a farm in Sherman, Texas, United States, to Alvis Edgar Owens Sr. and Maicie Azel (née Ellington) Owens.

In the biography About Buck., Rich Kienzle writes: "'Buck' was a donkey on the Owens farm." "When Alvis Jr. was three or four years old, he walked into the house and announced that his name also was 'Buck'. That was fine with the family, and the boy's name became 'Buck' from then on." He attended public school for grades 1–3 in Garland, Texas.

Owens's family moved to Mesa, Arizona, in 1937 during the Dust Bowl and Great Depression. While attending school in Arizona, Owens found that while he disliked formal schoolwork, he could often satisfy class requirements by singing or performing in school plays. As a result, he began to take part in such activities whenever he could.

=== Early career ===
A self-taught musician and singer, Owens became proficient on guitar, mandolin, horns, and drums. When he obtained his first electric steel guitar, he taught himself to play it after his father adapted an old radio into an amplifier. Owens quit school in the ninth grade to help work on his father's farm and pursue a music career. In 1945, he co-hosted a radio show called Buck and Britt. Co-host Theryl Ray Britten and Owens also played at local bars, where owners usually allowed them and a third member of their band to pass the hat during a show and keep 10% of the take. They eventually became the resident musicians at a Phoenix bar called the Romo Buffet.

In the late 1940s, Owens became a truck driver, a job which took him through the San Joaquin Valley of California, where he first experienced and was impressed by the town of Bakersfield. He and his first wife eventually settled there in 1951. Soon, Owens was frequently traveling to Hollywood for session recording jobs at Capitol Records, playing backup for Tennessee Ernie Ford, Wanda Jackson, Tommy Collins, Tommy Duncan, and many others.

Using the pseudonym "Corky Jones" to prevent the recording of a rock 'n' roll tune from hurting his aspiring Country Music career, Owens recorded a rockabilly record called "Hot Dog" for the Pep label. Some time in the 1950s he lived with his second wife and children in Fife, Washington, where he sang with the Dusty Rhodes band.

In 1958 Owens met Don Rich in Steve's Gay 90s Restaurant in South Tacoma, Washington. Owens had observed one of Rich's shows and immediately approached him about collaborating, after which Rich began playing fiddle with Owens at local venues. They were featured on the weekly BAR-K Jamboree on KTNT-TV 11. In 1959, Owens's career took off when his song "Second Fiddle" hit No. 24 on the Billboard country chart. Soon after, "Under Your Spell Again" made it to No. 4 on the charts and Capitol Records wanted Owens to return to Bakersfield, California.

Following their success, Owens tried unsuccessfully to convince Rich to accompany him to Bakersfield. Instead, Rich opted to go to become a music teacher at Centralia College. While there, he tutored on the side but continued playing local venues. In December 1960, however, he left to rejoin Owens in Bakersfield.

"Above and Beyond" hit No. 3. On April 2, 1960, and Owens performed the song on ABC-TV's Ozark Jubilee.

=== Career peak ===
In early 1963, the Johnny Russell song "Act Naturally" was pitched to Owens, who initially didn't like it. His guitarist and longtime collaborator Don Rich, however, enjoyed it and convinced Owens to record it with the Buckaroos. Laid down on February 12, 1963, it was released on March 11 and entered the charts on April 13. By June 15 the single began its first of four non-consecutive weeks at the No. 1 position, Owens's first top hit. The Beatles recorded a cover of it in 1965 with Ringo Starr as lead singer. Starr later recorded a duet of it with Owens in 1988.

The 1966 album Carnegie Hall Concert was a smash hit and further cemented Buck Owens as a top country artist. It achieved crossover success on the pop charts, reinforced by R&B singer Ray Charles releasing cover versions of two of Owens's songs that became pop hits that year: "Crying Time" and "Together Again".

In 1967, Owens and the Buckaroos toured Japan, a then-rare occurrence for a country act. The subsequent live album, Buck Owens and His Buckaroos in Japan, was an early example of a country band recording outside the United States.

Owens and the Buckaroos performed at the White House for President Lyndon B. Johnson in 1968, which was later released as a live album.

Between 1968 and 1969, pedal steel guitar player Tom Brumley and drummer Willie Cantu left the band, replaced by JayDee Maness and Jerry Wiggins. Owens and the Buckaroos had two songs reach No. 1 on the country music charts in 1969, "Tall Dark Stranger" and "Who's Gonna Mow Your Grass". In 1969, they recorded a live album, Live in London, where they premiered their rock song "A Happening In London Town" and their version of Chuck Berry's song "Johnny B. Goode".

During this time Hee Haw, starring Owens and the Buckaroos, was at its height of popularity. The series, originally envisioned as country music's version of Rowan & Martin's Laugh-In, went on to run in various incarnations for 231 episodes over 24 seasons. Creedence Clearwater Revival mentioned Owens by name in their 1970 single "Lookin' Out My Back Door". Owens frequented the nightclubs of Jack Ruby, where he encountered Lulu Roman—then working as bawdy comic relief at one of Ruby's clubs—and hired Roman to join the cast of Hee Haw.

Also between 1968 and 1970, Owens made guest appearances on top TV variety programs, including The Dean Martin Show, The Ed Sullivan Show, The Jackie Gleason Show, and seven times on The Jimmy Dean Show.

In the early 1970s, Owens and the Buckaroos enjoyed a string of hit duets with his protege Susan Raye, who subsequently became a popular solo artist with Owens as her producer.

In 1971, the Buckaroos' bass guitarist Doyle Holly left the band to pursue a solo career. Holly was known for his booming deep voice on solo ballads. His departure was a setback to the band, as Doyle had received the Bass Player of the Year award from the Academy of Country Music the year before and served as co-lead vocalist (along with Don Rich) of the Buckaroos. Holly went on to record two solo records in the early 1970s; both were top 20 hits.

Owens and Rich were the only members left of the original band, and in the 1970s they struggled to top the country music charts. However, the popularity of Hee Haw allowed them to enjoy large crowds at indoor arenas.

After three years of not having a No. 1 song, Owens and the Buckaroos had another No. 1 hit, "Made in Japan", in 1972. The band had been without pedal steel since late in 1969 when Maness departed. In April he added pedal steel guitarist, Jerry Brightman, and Owens returned to his grassroots sound of fiddle, steel, and electric guitars, releasing a string of singles including "Arms Full of Empty", "Ain't it Amazing Gracie" and "Ain't Gonna Have Ole Buck (to Kick Around no More)". Owens's original version of "Streets of Bakersfield" was released in 1972.

=== Death of Don Rich ===
On July 17, 1974, Owens's best friend, the Buckaroos' guitarist Don Rich, was killed when he lost control of his motorcycle and struck a guard rail on Highway 1 in Morro Bay, where he was to have joined his family for vacation. Owens was devastated. "He was like a brother, a son and a best friend," he said in the late 1990s. "Something I never said before, maybe I couldn't, but I think my music life ended when he died. Oh yeah, I carried on and I existed, but the real joy and love, the real lightning and thunder is gone forever." Owens would never fully recover from the tragedy, either emotionally or professionally.

=== Business ventures ===
KUZZ Radio logo featuring a depiction of Owens's trademark guitar

Before the 1960s ended, Owens and manager Jack McFadden began to concentrate on Owens's financial future. He bought several radio stations, including KNIX (AM) (later KCWW) and KNIX-FM in Phoenix and KUZZ-FM in Bakersfield. During the 1990s, Owens was co-owner of the country music network Real Country, of which the Owens-owned station KCWW was the flagship station. In 1998, Owens sold KCWW to ABC/Disney for $8,850,000, and he sold KNIX-FM to Clear Channel Communications, but he maintained ownership of KUZZ until his death.

Owens established Buck Owens Enterprises and produced records by several artists. He had recorded for Warner Bros. Records, but by the 1980s was no longer recording, instead devoting his time to overseeing his business empire from Bakersfield. He left Hee Haw in 1986.

=== Later career ===
Country artist Dwight Yoakam was largely influenced by Owens's style of music and teamed up with him for a duet of "Streets of Bakersfield" in 1988. It was Owens's first No. 1 single in 16 years. In an interview, Yoakam described the first time he met with Owens:

We sat there that day in 1987 and talked about my music to that point, my short career, and what I'd been doing and how he'd been watching me. I was really flattered and thrilled to know that this legend had been keeping an eye on me.

Owens also collaborated with Cledus T. Judd on the song "The First Redneck On The Internet" in 1998, for which Owens also appears in the music video.

The 1990s saw a flood of reissues of Owens's Capitol recordings on compact disc, the publishing rights to which Owens had bought in 1974 as part of his final contract with the label. His albums had been out of print for nearly 15 years when he released a retrospective box set in 1990. Encouraged by brisk sales, Owens struck a distribution deal with Sundazed Music of New York, which specializes in reissuing obscure recordings. The bulk of his Capitol catalog was reissued on CD in 1995, 1997, and in 2005. Sometime in the 1970s, Owens had also purchased the remaining copies of his original LP albums from Capitol's distribution warehouses across the country. Many of those records (still in the shrinkwrap) were stored by Owens for decades. He often gave them away as gifts and sold them at his nightclub for a premium price some 35 years later.

In August 1999, Owens reunited the remaining members of his original Buckaroo Band to help him celebrate his 70th birthday at his Crystal Palace in Bakersfield. Owens, Doyle Holly, Tom Brumley, and Wille Cantu performed old hits from their heyday including "I've Got a Tiger By the Tail" and "Act Naturally".

Long before Owens became the famous co-host of Hee Haw, his band became known for their signature Bakersfield sound, later emulated by artists such as Merle Haggard, Dwight Yoakam, and Brad Paisley. Owens inspired indie country songwriter and friend Terry Fraley, whose band "The Nudie Cowboys" possessed a similar sound. This sound was originally made possible with two trademark silver-sparkle Fender Telecaster guitars, often played simultaneously by Owens and longtime lead guitarist Don Rich. Fender had made a "Buck Owens signature Telecaster", and after his death paid tribute to him. In 2003, Paisley blended creative styles with this guitar and his own Paisley Telecaster, creating what became known as the Buck-O-Caster. Initially, only two were made; one for Paisley and the other presented to Owens during a New Year's celebration that Paisley attended in 2004.

Following the death of Rich, Owens's latter trademark became a red, white and blue acoustic guitar, along with a 1974 Pontiac convertible "Nudiemobile", adorned with pistols and silver dollars. A similar car, created by Nudie Cohn for Elvis Presley and later won by Owens in a bet, is now enshrined behind the bar at Owens's Crystal Palace Nightclub in Bakersfield.

Owens would hand out replicas of his trademark acoustic guitar to friends, acquaintances, and fans. Each would contain a gold plaque with the name of the recipient. Some of these guitars cost $1,000 or more.

== Personal life ==
Owens was married four times, three ending in divorce and one in annulment. He married country singer Bonnie Campbell Owens in 1948. They had two sons, one of whom was Buddy Alan. The couple separated in 1951 and later divorced.

In 1956, Owens married Phyllis Buford with whom he had a third son. In the 1970s, he had a relationship with Hee Haw "Honey" Lisa Todd and appeared with her as "Buck Owens and his gal Lisa" on the TV game show Tattletales.

In 1977, he wed Buckaroos fiddle player Jana Jae Greif. Within a few days he filed for annulment, then changed his mind; the couple continued the on-and-off marriage for a year before divorcing. In 1979 he married Jennifer Smith.

Owens had three sons: Buddy Alan (who charted several hits as a Capitol recording artist in the early 1970s and appeared with his father numerous times on Hee Haw), Johnny, and Michael Owens.

Owens successfully recovered from oral cancer in the early 1990s, but had additional health problems near the end of the 1990s and the early 2000s, including pneumonia and a minor stroke in 2004. These health problems had forced him to curtail his regular weekly performances with the Buckaroos at his Crystal Palace. Owens died at his ranch just north of Bakersfield on March 25, 2006. He was 76 years old.

Owens was inducted into the Country Music Hall of Fame in 1996. He was ranked No. 12 in CMT's 40 Greatest Men of Country Music in 2003. In addition, CMT also ranked the Buckaroos No. 2 in the network's 20 Greatest Bands in 2005. He was also inducted into the Nashville Songwriters Hall of Fame.

The stretch of US Highway 82 in Sherman, Texas, is named the Buck Owens Freeway in his honor.

== Biographies ==
In November 2013, Buck Owens's posthumous autobiography Buck 'Em! The Autobiography of Buck Owens by Buck Owens with Randy Poe was released. The book has a foreword by Brad Paisley and a preface by Dwight Yoakam.

In a 2007 authorized biography Buck, historian Kathryn Burke gives a positive account of Owens.

In Buck Owens: The Biography (2010) investigative journalist Eileen Sisk offers a critical account of Owens and the shortcomings in his private life.

== Covers of Owens songs ==
- Vocalist–guitarist Johnny Rivers recorded a rock version of Owens's "Under Your Spell Again" on his album Meanwhile, Back at the Whiskey A GoGo in 1965.
- Country music singer Emmylou Harris recorded a version of Owens's "Together Again", which was released on her 1976 album Elite Hotel.
- The Beatles and, later, Ringo Starr recorded versions of "Act Naturally". The Beatles recorded the song in 1965, two years after Owens released it. Starr recorded it as a duet with Owens in 1988, which received a nomination for the Grammy Award for Best Country Vocal Collaboration in 1989.
- After his death in 2006, a medley was played by the Buck Owens All Star Tribute, which included Billy Gibbons, Chris Hillman, Brad Paisley and Travis Barker.
- Country artist Dwight Yoakam has cited Owens as an early influence in his career and recorded several of Owens's songs. He recorded a duet with Owens of the song "Streets of Bakersfield", originally recorded by Owens in 1973. In 2007, Yoakam released a tribute album, Dwight Sings Buck.
- Mark Lanegan included a cover of "Together Again" on his 1999 cover album, I'll Take Care of You.
- Filipina actress and singer Jolina Magdangal included a cover of "Crying Time" on her 2000 cover album, On Memory Lane.
- Cake covered "Excuse Me (I Think I've Got a Heartache)" on its album B-Sides and Rarities.
- In 2007, Austin-San Marcos, Texas band The Derailers released Under The Influence of Buck, which featured 12 covers of Owens songs, including "Under the Influence of Love".
- In 2011, Ben Gibbard covered "Love's Gonna Live Here".
