= Billboard Top Country Singles of 1965 =

This is a list of Billboard magazine's ranking of the year's top country singles of 1965.

Eddy Arnold had the year's number one single with "What's He Doing in My World". Buck Owens had the number two single with "I've Got a Tiger By the Tail".

Rank	Peak (Note: This column recites the record's peak position on Billboard's weekly charts.)	Title	Artist(s)	Label
1	1	"What's He Doing in My World"	Eddy Arnold	RCA Victor
2	1	"I've Got a Tiger By the Tail"	Buck Owens	Capitol
3	1	"Yes, Mr. Peters"	Roy Drusky with Priscilla Mitchell	Mercury
4	1	"The Bridge Washed Out"	Warner Mack	Decca
5	2	"The Other Woman (In My Life)"	Ray Price	Columbia
6	4	"Then and Only Then"	Connie Smith	RCA Victor
7	1	"Before You Go"	Buck Owens	Capitol
8	1	"King of the Road"	Roger Miller	Smash
9	1	"You're the Only World I Know"	Sonny James	Capitol
10	2	"I'll Keep Holding On (Just to Your Love)"	Sonny James	Capitol
11	2	"10 Little Bottles"	Johnny Bond	Starday
12	1	"Ribbon of Darkness"	Marty Robbins	Columbia
13	1	"Girl on the Billboard"	Del Reeves	United Artists
14	4	"Sittin' in an All Nite Cafe"	Warner Mack	Decca
15	3	"Happy Birthday"	Loretta Lynn	Decca
16	1	"The First Thing Ev'ry Morning (And the Last Thing Ev'ry Night)"	Jimmy Dean	Columbia
17	6	"All My Friends Are Gonna Be Strangers"	Roy Drusky	Mercury
18	5	"A Tombstone Every Mile"	Dick Curless	Tower
19	3	"Ode to the Little Brown Shack Out Back"	Billy Edd Wheeler	Kapp
20	4	"Yakety Axe"	Chet Atkins	RCA Victor
21	9	"Things Have Gone to Pieces"	George Jones	Musicor
22	7	"The Wishing Well (Down in the Well)"	Hank Snow	RCA Victor
23	10	"(My Friends Are Gonna Be) Strangers"	Merle Haggard	Tally
24	6	"Tiger Woman"	Claude King	Columbia
25	2	"Engine Engine Number 9"	Roger Miller	Smash
26	7	"Blue Kentucky Girl"	Loretta Lynn	Decca
27	7	"Do What You Do Do Well"	Ned Miller	Fabor
28	4	"You Don't Hear"	Kitty Wells	Decca
29	1	"Is It Really Over?"	Jim Reeves	RCA Victor
30	3	"I Won't Forget You"	Jim Reeves	RCA Victor
31	8	"I Washed My Hands In Muddy Water"	Stonewall Jackson	Columbia
32	3	Truck Drivin' Son-of-a-Gun	Dave Dudley	Mercury
33	9	"I Can't Remember"	Connie Smith	RCA Victor
34	3	"Orange Blossom Special"	Johnny Cash	Columbia
35	1	"Only You (Can Break My Heart)"	Buck Owens	Capitol
36	8	"Matamoros"	Billy Walker	Columbia
37	1	"Once a Day"	Connie Smith	RCA Victor
38	3	"Four Strong Winds"	Bobby Bare	RCA Victor
39	4	"Green, Green Grass of Home"	Porter Wagoner	RCA Victor
40	7	"See the Big Man Cry"	Charlie Louvin	Capitol
41	4	"It Ain't Me Babe"	Johnny Cash and June Carter	Columbia
42	8	"Wild as a Wildcat"	Charlie Walker	Epic
43	3	"The Race Is On"	George Jones	United Artists
44	10	Walk Tall	Faron Young	Mercury
45	1	"Behind the Tear"	Sonny James	Capitol
46	7	"It's Alright"	Bobby Bare	RCA Victor
47	8	"I'll Repossess My Heart"	Kitty Wells	Decca
48	12	"She's Gone Gone Gone"	Lefty Frizzell	Columbia
49	12	"Certain"	Bill Anderson	Decca
50	11	"Truck Drivin' Man"	George Hamilton IV	RCA Victor

== See also ==
- List of Hot Country Singles number ones of 1965
- List of Billboard Hot 100 number ones of 1965
- 1965 in country music
