= List of Hot Country Singles number ones of 1965 =

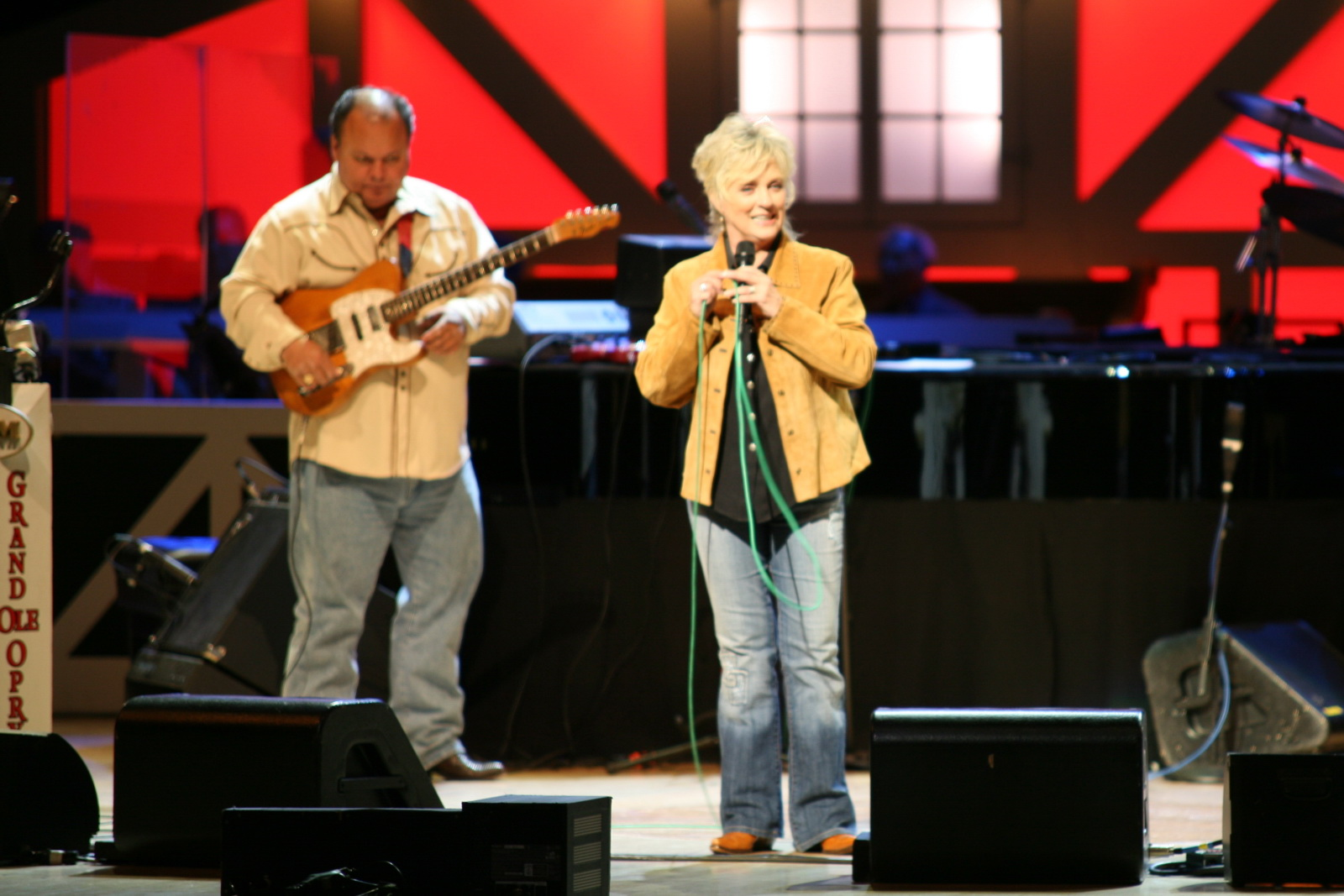
Connie Smith (pictured in 2007) ended an eight-week run at number one in January. This would remain the longest run in the top spot by a female vocalist for nearly 50 years.

Hot Country Songs is a chart that ranks the top-performing country music songs in the United States, published by Billboard magazine. In 1965, 19 different singles topped the chart, which was published at the time under the title Hot Country Singles, in 52 issues of the magazine. Chart placings were based on playlists submitted by country music radio stations and sales reports submitted by stores.

At the start of the year, Connie Smith was at number one with "Once a Day", the song's sixth week atop the chart, and remained at number one until the issue dated January 23, 1965, when it was displaced by "You're the Only World I Know" by Sonny James. "Once a Day"'s total of eight consecutive weeks at number one set a new record for the longest unbroken run by a solo female singer atop the Hot Country chart which stood until 2012 when Taylor Swift's "We Are Never Ever Getting Back Together" remained atop the chart for nine consecutive weeks. Smith was the only solo female vocalist to appear at number one on the country listing in 1965; the only other female artist to reach the top spot during the year was Priscilla Mitchell, who topped the chart with "Yes, Mr. Peters", a duet with Roy Drusky.

Buck Owens, one of the most successful recording artists of the mid-1960s, spent the highest total number of weeks at number one in 1965 with thirteen. He also had the most number ones of the year, taking four different singles to the top spot. Three other artists achieved multiple number ones during the year, each topping the chart twice. Eddy Arnold, one of the biggest country music stars of the 1940s and early 1950s, had revitalized his somewhat declining career by embracing the "Nashville sound", a newer style of country music which eschewed elements of the earlier honky-tonk style in favor of smooth productions which had a broader appeal. In 1965 he gained two number ones, the first of which, "What's He Doing in My World", was his first chart-topper since 1955. Jim Reeves also achieved two chart-toppers in 1965, both of which were posthumous; the singer had been killed in a plane crash the previous year. Sonny James also topped the chart twice during the year. Del Reeves, Warner Mack, Little Jimmy Dickens, and the duet pairing of Roy Drusky and Priscilla Mitchell all achieved their first career number ones in 1965. Johnny Wright also reached number one for the first time as a solo artist; he had previously spent time at number one in 1954 as half of the duo Johnnie & Jack, but had been forced to go solo after his singing partner Jack Anglin was killed in a car crash in 1963. Neither Wright nor any of the other acts to achieve a first career number one in 1965 would ever return to the top spot.

== Chart history ==
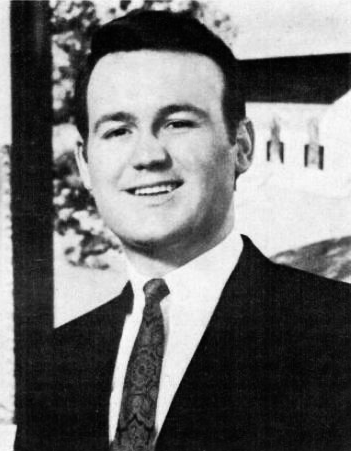
Warner Mack achieved his only number one in 1965.

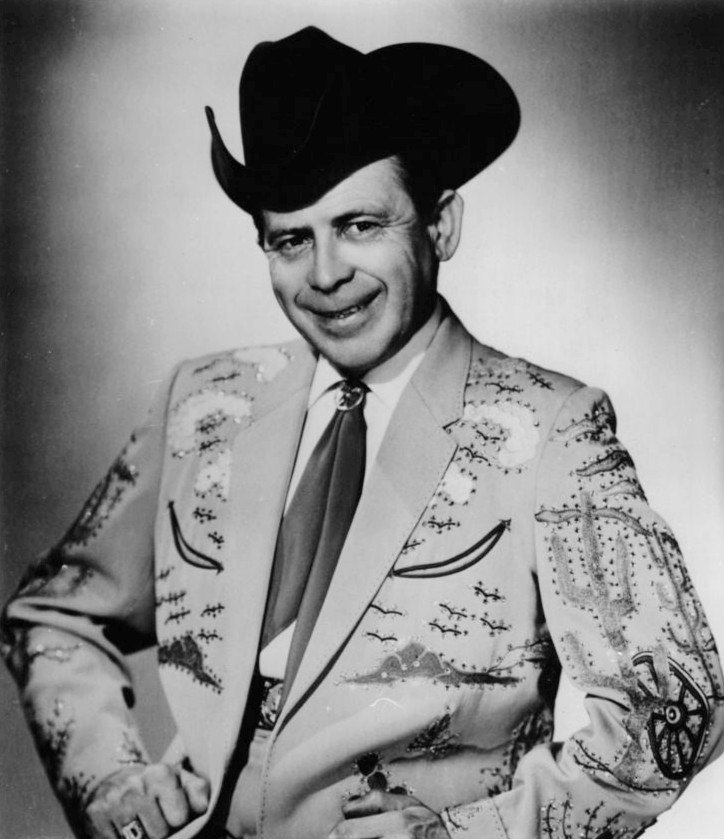
Little Jimmy Dickens took the novelty song "May the Bird of Paradise Fly Up Your Nose" to number one in November.

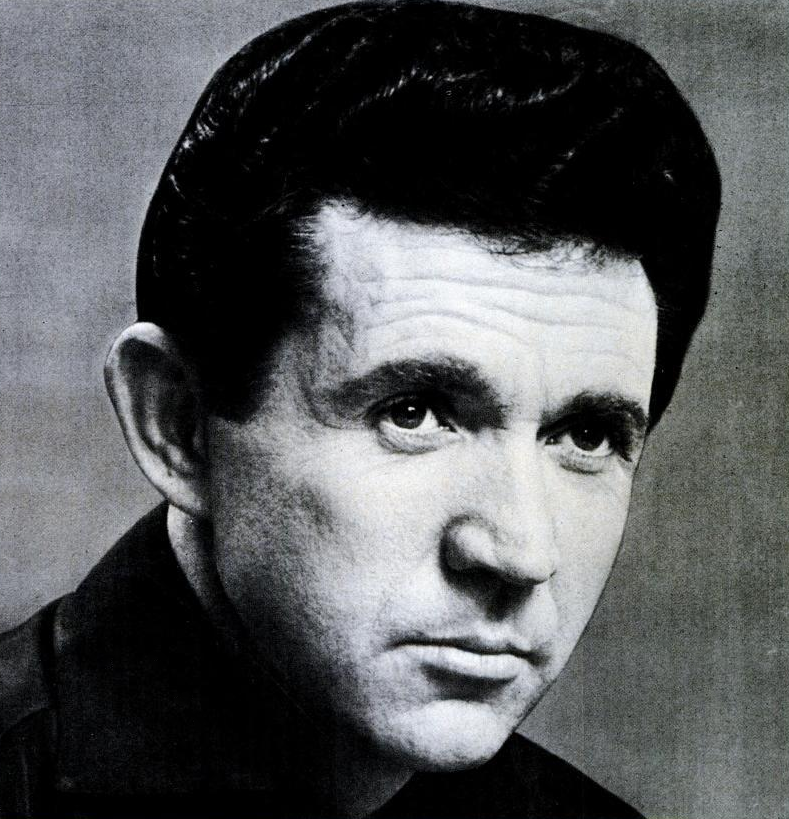
Sonny James had two chart-toppers during the year.

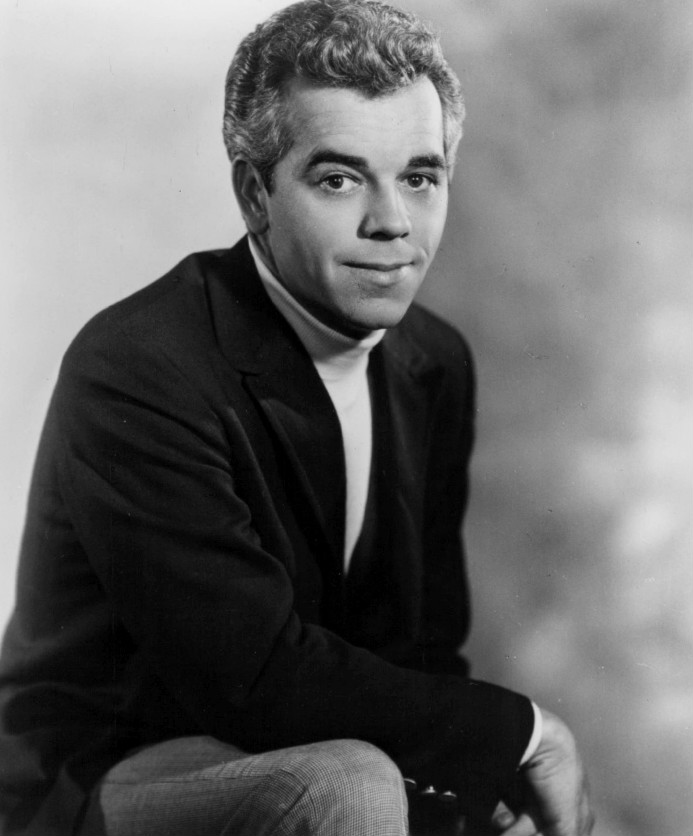
The number-one hit "Yes, Mr. Peters" was one of a number of duets which Roy Drusky (pictured) recorded with Priscilla Mitchell.

Hot Country Singles number ones of 1965
Issue date	Title	Artist(s)	Ref.
January 2	"Once a Day"	Connie Smith	
January 9	"Once a Day"	Connie Smith	
January 16	"Once a Day"	Connie Smith	
January 23	"You're the Only World I Know"	Sonny James	
January 30	"You're the Only World I Know"	Sonny James	
February 6	"You're the Only World I Know"	Sonny James	
February 13	"You're the Only World I Know"	Sonny James	
February 20	"I've Got a Tiger By the Tail"	Buck Owens	
February 27	"I've Got a Tiger By the Tail"	Buck Owens	
March 6	"I've Got a Tiger By the Tail"	Buck Owens	
March 13	"I've Got a Tiger By the Tail"	Buck Owens	
March 20	"I've Got a Tiger By the Tail"	Buck Owens	
March 27	"King of the Road"	Roger Miller	
April 3	"King of the Road"	Roger Miller	
April 10	"King of the Road"	Roger Miller	
April 17	"King of the Road"	Roger Miller	
April 24	"King of the Road"	Roger Miller	
May 1	"This Is It"	Jim Reeves	
May 8	"This Is It"	Jim Reeves	
May 15	"Girl on the Billboard"	Del Reeves	
May 22	"Girl on the Billboard"	Del Reeves	
May 29	"This Is It"	Jim Reeves	
June 5	"What's He Doing in My World"	Eddy Arnold	
June 12	"What's He Doing in My World"	Eddy Arnold	
June 19	"Ribbon of Darkness"	Marty Robbins	
June 26	"Before You Go"	Buck Owens	
July 3	"Before You Go"	Buck Owens	
July 10	"Before You Go"	Buck Owens	
July 17	"Before You Go"	Buck Owens	
July 24	"Before You Go"	Buck Owens	
July 31	"Before You Go"	Buck Owens	
August 7	"The First Thing Ev'ry Morning (And the Last Thing Ev'ry Night)"	Jimmy Dean	
August 14	"The First Thing Ev'ry Morning (And the Last Thing Ev'ry Night)"	Jimmy Dean	
August 21	"Yes, Mr. Peters"	Roy Drusky and Priscilla Mitchell	
August 28	"Yes, Mr. Peters"	Roy Drusky and Priscilla Mitchell	
September 4	"The Bridge Washed Out"	Warner Mack	
September 11	"Is It Really Over?"	Jim Reeves	
September 18	"Is It Really Over?"	Jim Reeves	
September 25	"Is It Really Over?"	Jim Reeves	
October 2	"Only You (Can Break My Heart)"	Buck Owens	
October 9	"Behind the Tear"	Sonny James	
October 16	"Behind the Tear"	Sonny James	
October 23	"Hello Vietnam"	Johnnie Wright	
October 30	"Hello Vietnam"	Johnnie Wright	
November 6	"Hello Vietnam"	Johnnie Wright	
November 13	"Behind the Tear"	Sonny James	
November 20	"May the Bird of Paradise Fly Up Your Nose"	Little Jimmy Dickens	
November 27	"May the Bird of Paradise Fly Up Your Nose"	Little Jimmy Dickens	
December 4	"Make The World Go Away"	Eddy Arnold	
December 11	"Make The World Go Away"	Eddy Arnold	
December 18	"Make The World Go Away"	Eddy Arnold	
December 25	"Buckaroo"	Buck Owens and his Buckaroos	

== See also ==
- 1965 in music
- 1965 in country music
- List of artists who reached number one on the U.S. country chart
