= 8th Annual Grammy Awards =

1966 US music awards ceremony

- Date: March 15, 1966
- Location: Radio City Music Hall, New York City
- Hosted by: Jerry Lewis

Television/radio coverage
- Network: ABC

The 8th Annual Grammy Awards were held March 15, 1966, at Chicago, Los Angeles, Nashville and New York. They recognized accomplishments of musicians for the year 1965. Roger Miller topped off the Grammys by winning 5 awards, whereas Herb Alpert and Frank Sinatra each won 4 awards.

Bob Hope opened the show.

== Performers ==
- Duke Ellington & Tony Bennett - Don't Get Around Much Anymore
- Dinah Shore tribute

== Presenters ==
- Tony Bennett - Presented Duke Ellington with the Lifetime Achievement Award

== Award winners ==
The following awards were the winners and nominees of the 8th annual awards ceremony:

- Record of the Year
  - Jerry Moss (producer) & Herb Alpert (producer and artist) for "A Taste of Honey" performed by Herb Alpert & the Tijuana Brass
  - George Martin (producer) for "Yesterday" performed by The Beatles
  - Ernie Altschuler & Al Stanton (producers) for "The Shadow Of Your Smile (Love Theme From The Sandpiper)" performed by Tony Bennett
  - Esmond Edwards (producer) for "The 'In' Crowd" performed by Ramsey Lewis Trio
  - Jerry Kennedy (producer) for "King Of The Road" performed by Roger Miller
- Album of the Year
  - Sonny Burke (producer) & Frank Sinatra for September of My Years
  - Herb Alpert & The Tijuana Brass for Whipped Cream And Other Delights
  - Julie Andrews & cast for The Sound Of Music (Motion Picture Soundtrack)
  - Eddy Arnold for My World
  - Barbra Streisand for My Name Is Barbra
  - The Beatles for Help!
- Song of the Year
  - Johnny Mandel & Paul Francis Webster (songwriters) for "The Shadow of Your Smile" (Love Theme From The Sandpiper) performed by Tony Bennett
  - John Lennon & Paul McCartney (songwriters) for "Yesterday" performed by The Beatles
  - Sammy Cahn & Jimmy Van Heusen (songwriters) for "September Of My Years" performed by Frank Sinatra
  - Roger Miller (songwriter & performer) for "King Of The Road"
  - Jacques Demy, Norman Gimbel & Michel Legrand (songwriters) for "I Will Wait For You - Theme From The Umbrellas Of Cherbourg" performed by Michel Legrand
- Best New Artist
  - Tom Jones
  - The Byrds
  - Glenn Yarbrough
  - Horst Jankowski
  - Herman's Hermits
  - Sonny & Cher
  - Marilyn Maye

=== Children's ===
- Best Recording for Children
  - Marvin Miller for Dr. Seuss Presents "Fox in Socks" and "Green Eggs and Ham"
  - Sterling Holloway & Sebastian Cabot for Winnie The Pooh And The Honey Tree
  - David Seville & The Chipmunks for "Supercalifragelistic Expialidocious"
  - Carmel Quinn for Patrick Muldoon And His Magic Balloon
  - Diahann Carroll for Love Songs For Children: "A" You're Adorable

=== Classical ===
- Best Classical Performance - Orchestra
  - Leopold Stokowski (conductor) & the American Symphony Orchestra for Ives: Symphony No. 4
- Best Classical Vocal Soloist Performance
  - Erich Leinsdorf (conductor), Leontyne Price & the Boston Symphony Orchestra for Strauss: Salome (Dance of the Seven Veils, Interlude, Final Scene)/The Egyptian Helen (Awakening Scene)
- Best Opera Recording
  - Karl Böhm (conductor), Dietrich Fischer-Dieskau, Evelyn Lear, Fritz Wunderlich & the German Opera Orchestra & Chorus for Berg: Wozzeck
- Best Classical Choral Performance (other than opera)
  - Robert Shaw (conductor), the Robert Shaw Chorale & the RCA Victor Symphony Orchestra for Stravinsky: Symphony of Psalms/Poulenc: Gloria
- Best Classical Performance - Instrumental Soloist or Soloists (with orchestra)
  - Erich Leinsdorf (conductor), Arthur Rubinstein & the Boston Symphony Orchestra for Beethoven: Piano Concerto No. 4 in G
- Best Classical Performance - Instrumental Soloist or Soloists (without orchestra)
  - Vladimir Horowitz for Horowitz at Carnegie Hall - An Historic Return
- Best Classical Chamber Music Performance - Instrumental or Vocal
  - The Juilliard String Quartet for Bartók: The Six String Quartets
- Best Composition by a Contemporary Classical Composer
  - Charles Ives (composer) for Ives: Symphony No. 4 conducted by Leopold Stokowski
- Album of the Year - Classical
  - Thomas Frost (producer) & Vladimir Horowitz for Horowitz at Carnegie Hall - An Historic Return
- Most Promising New Classical Recording Artist
  - Peter Serkin

=== Comedy ===
- Best Comedy Performance
  - Bill Cosby for Why Is There Air?
  - Various artists for You Don't Have To Be Jewish
  - Earl Doud & Alen Robin for Welcome To The L.B.J. Ranch
  - Godfrey Cambridge for Them Cotton Pickin' Days Is Over (Performed Live At The Hungry I)
  - The Smothers Brothers for Mom Always Liked You Best

=== Composing and arranging ===
- Best Original Score Written for a Motion Picture or Television Show
  - Johnny Mandel (composer) for The Sandpiper performed by the Robert Armbruster Orchestra
  - Mikis Theodorakis (composer) for Zorba The Greek (Motion Picture) performed by various artists
  - Jacques Demy & Michel Legrand (composers) for The Umbrellas Of Cherbourg performed by Jacques Demy
  - Jerry Goldsmith, Walter Scharf, Lalo Schifrin & Mort Stevens (composers) for The Man From U.N.C.L.E. (Television Show) performed by various artists
  - George Harrison, John Lennon, Paul McCartney & Ken Thorne (composers) for Help! (Motion Picture) performed by The Beatles
- Best Instrumental Arrangement
  - Herb Alpert (arranger) for "A Taste of Honey" performed by Herb Alpert & the Tijuana Brass
  - Horst Jankowski (arranger & performer) for "Walk In The Black Forest"
  - Johnny Mandel (arranger) for "The Shadow Of Your Smile" performed by Robert Armbruster
  - Bob Florence (arranger) for "Mission To Moscow" performed by Si Zentner
  - Neal Hefti (arranger & performer) for "Girl Talk"
  - Jack Mason (arranger) for "A Hard Day's Night" performed by Arthur Fielder (conductor) and the Boston Pops
- Best Arrangement Accompanying a Vocalist or Instrumentalist
  - Gordon Jenkins (arranger) for "It Was a Very Good Year" performed by Frank Sinatra
  - George Martin (arranger) for "Yesterday" performed by The Beatles
  - Burt Bacharach (arranger) for "What The World Needs Now Is Love" performed by Jackie De Shannon
  - Les Reed (arranger) for "It's Not Unusual" performed by Tom Jones
  - Don Costa (arranger) for "He Touched Me" performed by Barbra Streisand
  - Gil Evens (arranger) for "Greensleeves" performed by Kenny Burrell
  - Bob Florence (arranger) for "Everything I've Got" performed by Vikki Carr
  - Claus Ogerman (arranger) for "Day By Day" performed by Astrud Gilberto

=== Country ===
- Best Country & Western Vocal Performance - Female
  - Jody Miller for "Queen of the House"
  - Skeeter Davis for "Sunglasses"
  - Molly Bee for "Single Girl Again"
  - Dottie West for "Before The Ring On Your Finger Turns Green"
  - Wilma Burgess for "Baby"
- Best Country and Western Vocal Performance, Male
  - Roger Miller for "King of the Road"
  - Bobby Bare for "Talk Me Some Sense"
  - Eddy Arnold for "Make The World Go Away"
  - Jim Reeves for "Is It Really Over"
  - Carl Belew for "Crystal Chandelier"
- Best Country & Western Single
  - Roger Miller for "King of the Road"
  - Carl Belew, Eddie Busch & B.J. Moore (songwriters) for "What's He Doing In My World" performed by Eddy Arnold
  - Neal Merritt (songwriter) for "May The Bird Of Paradise Fly Up Your Nose" performed by Little Jimmy Dickens
  - Lewis DeWitt (songwriter) for "Flowers On The Wall" performed by the Statler Brothers
  - Ted Harris (songwriter) for "Crystal Chandelier" performed by Carl Belew
- Best Country & Western Album
  - Roger Miller for The Return of Roger Miller
  - Jim Reeves for The Jim Reeves Way
  - Eddy Arnold for My World
  - Chet Atkins for More Of That Guitar Country
  - Hank Williams Sr. & Hanks Williams Jr. for Father And Son
- Best New Country & Western Artist
  - The Statler Brothers
  - Del Reeves
  - Norma Jean
  - Wilma Burgess
  - Jody Miller

=== Folk ===
- Best Folk Recording
  - Harry Belafonte & Miriam Makeba for An Evening with Belafonte/Makeba
  - Joan Baez for "There But For Fortune"
  - The Womenfolk for The Womenfolk At The Hungry I
  - Pete Seeger for Strangers And Cousins
  - Roscoe Holcomb for Roscoe Holcomb: The High Lonesome Sound
  - Miriam Makeba for Makeba Sings
  - Peter, Paul & Mary for A Song Will Rise

=== Gospel ===
- Best Gospel or Other Religious Recording (Musical)
  - Anita Kerr & George Beverly Shea for Southland Favorites
  - The Happy Goodman Family for "What A Happy Time"
  - Blackwood Brothers for Something Old, Something New
  - Tennessee Ernie Ford for Let Me Walk With Thee
  - Marian Anderson for "Just Keep On Singing"
  - Kate Smith for How Great Thou Art
  - Ralph Carmichael Singers And Orchestra for Bos Ashton's Songs Of Living Faith
  - Statesmen Quartet with Hovie Lister for All Day Sing And Dinner On The Ground

=== Jazz ===
- Best Instrumental Jazz Performance - Small Group or Soloist With Small Group
  - Ramsey Lewis for "The "In" Crowd" performed by the Ramsey Lewis Trio
  - Bill Evans Trio for Trio '65
  - Clark Terry & The Bob Brookmeyer Quintet for The Power Of Positive Swinging
  - Cal Tjader for Soul Sauce
  - Gary McFarland Group for "Soft Samba"
  - Paul Desmond & Jim Hall for Glad To Be Unhappy
  - Paul Horn for Cycle
  - John Coltrane for A Love Supreme
- Best Instrumental Jazz Performance - Large Group or Soloist with Large Group
  - Duke Ellington for Ellington '66
  - Stan Getz for Mickey One
  - Dizzy Gillespie, Gil Fuller conducting Monterey Jazz Festival Orchestra for "Love Theme From The Sandpiper"
  - Kenny Burrell & Gil Evans Orchestra for Kenny Burrell/Guitar Forms
  - Paul Horn for Jazz Suite On The Mass Texts
  - Rod Levitt for Insight
  - Wes Montgomery With String Orchestra for Bumpin'
- Best Original Jazz Composition
  - Lalo Schifrin (composer) for Jazz Suite on the Mass Texts performed by Paul Horn
  - Duke Ellington & Billy Strayhorn (composers) for Virgin Islands Suite performed by Duke Ellington
  - Eddie Sauter (composer) for "Mickey One" performed by Stan Getz
  - Oscar Peterson (composer & performer) for Canadiana Suite
  - Wes Montgomery (composer & performer) for Bumpin'
  - John Coltrane (composer & performer) for A Love Supreme

=== Musical show ===
- Best Score from an Original Cast Show Album
  - Alan J. Lerner, Burton Lane (composers), & the original cast (Barbara Harris, John Cullum, Titos Vandis, Byron Webster & William Daniels) for On a Clear Day You Can See Forever

=== Packaging and notes ===
- Best Album Cover, Graphic Arts
  - George Estes (art director) & James Alexander (graphic artist) for Bartók: Concerto No. 2 for Violin/Stravinsky: Concerto for Violin performed by Joseph Silverstein & conducted by Erich Leinsdorf
- Best Album Cover, Photography
  - Robert M. Jones (art director) & Ken Whitmore (photographer) for Jazz Suite on the Mass Texts performed by Paul Horn
- Best Album Notes
  - Stan Cornyn (notes writer) for September of My Years performed by Frank Sinatra

=== Pop ===
- Best Vocal Performance, Female
  - Barbra Streisand for My Name Is Barbra
- Best Vocal Performance, Male
  - Frank Sinatra for "It Was a Very Good Year"
- Best Performance by a Vocal Group
  - The Anita Kerr Singers for "We Dig Mancini"
- Best Performance by a Chorus
  - Ward Swingle for Anyone for Mozart? performed by the Swingle Singers
- Best Instrumental Performance
  - Herb Alpert for "A Taste of Honey" performed by Herb Alpert and the Tijuana Brass
- Best Contemporary (R&R) Vocal Performance - Female
  - Petula Clark for "I Know a Place"
- Best Contemporary (R&R) Vocal Performance - Male
  - Roger Miller for "King of the Road"
- Best Contemporary (R&R) Performance - Group (Vocal or Instrumental)
  - The Statler Brothers for "Flowers on the Wall"
- Best Contemporary (R&R) Single
  - Roger Miller for "King of the Road"

=== Production and engineering ===
- Best Engineered Recording - Non-Classical
  - Larry Levine (engineer) for "A Taste of Honey" performed by Herb Alpert & the Tijuana Brass
- Best Engineered Recording, Classical
  - Fred Plaut (engineer) & Vladimir Horowitz for Horowitz at Carnegie Hall - An Historic Return

=== R&B ===
- Best Rhythm & Blues Recording
  - James Brown for "Papa's Got a Brand New Bag"

=== Spoken ===
- Best Spoken Word or Drama Recording
  - Goddard Lieberson (producer) for John F. Kennedy - As We Remember Him
