= Blue Kentucky Girl =

Blue Kentucky Girl may refer to:

- Blue Kentucky Girl (Emmylou Harris album), 1979
- Blue Kentucky Girl (Loretta Lynn album), 1965
  - "Blue Kentucky Girl" (song), a 1965 song by Loretta Lynn
