= Little Jimmy Dickens' Greatest Hits =

Little Jimmy Dickens' Greatest Hits is a Greatest Hits album by Little Jimmy Dickens released in 1966. It reached No. 39 on the Billboard album chart.

== Track listing ==
1. "Take an Old Cold Tater (And Wait)" (Eugene Bartlett)
2. "May the Bird of Paradise Fly up Your Nose" (Neal Merritt)
3. "He Knocked Me Right Out of the Box" (Harlan Howard)
4. "When the Ship Hits the Sand" (Larry Kingston)
5. "Truck Load of Starvin' Kangaroos" (Dallas Frazier, Billy Mize)
6. "A-Sleeping at the Foot of the Bed" (Eugene B. Wilson, Happy Wilson)
7. "Out Behind the Barn" (Boudleaux Bryant)
8. "Night Train to Memphis" (Owen Bradley, Marvin Hughes, Harry Beasley Smith)
9. "Fireball Mail" (Fred Rose)
10. "Wabash Cannonball" (A.P. Carter)
11. "Y'all Come" (Arlie Duff)
