= List of killings by law enforcement officers in the United States, November 2024 =

This is a list of people reported killed by non-military law enforcement officers in the United States in November 2024, whether in the line of duty or not, and regardless of reason or method. The listing documents the occurrence of a death, making no implications regarding wrongdoing or justification on the part of the person killed or officer involved. Killings are arranged by date of the incident that caused death. Different death dates, if known, are noted in the description. The table below lists 103 people.

== November 2024 ==
Date	Name (age) of deceased	Race	Location	Description
2024-11-30	Donovan Joyner (26)	White	Bowling Green, Ohio	A registered sex offender led state troopers on a police chase after fleeing a traffic stop. After the chase, the suspect exited the car in Wood County and began firing his gun. When he pointed his gun at state troopers, they shot and killed him.
2024-11-30	unidentified male	Unknown	Denver, Colorado	Deputies responded to a request for a wellness check on a man. The man reportedly approached the deputies with an axe and ignored commands before being fatally shot.
2024-11-30	Tyree Winslow (29)	Black	Laurel, Maryland	
2024-11-30	Rodolfo Daniel Lima (22)	White	Crossville, Tennessee	Cumberland County Sheriff’s Office responded to a home for an initial shooting and encountered Lima in the driveway, armed with a handgun. Lima refused to drop the gun and shot at the deputies. At least one deputy returned fire, fatally striking him.
2024-11-30	Jean A. Cesar (40)	Unknown	Lovejoy, Georgia	Lovejoy Police found a suspicious car inside a county parking lot. When the officer approached, he saw Cesar racking the slide of a handgun. Cesar then pointed it at the officer, prompting the officer to shoot and kill him.
2024-11-30	Ryan Nichols (34)	White	Westbrook, Maine	Police received a report of a man with mental illness was hurting his mother. Upon arrival, they found the man, Nichols, had an active felony arrest warrant. When the officers attempted to arrest him, he ran to his neighbors house and armed himself with a metal object, refusing to stop. That's when police opened fire, killing him.
2024-11-29	unidentified male	Unknown	Bolt, West Virginia	Police responded to reports of an armed individual with mental illness. The first deputy arrived to the residence was being shot at and returned fire, killing the shooter.
2024-11-29	Noland H. Clark (47)	Unknown	North Charleston, South Carolina	
2024-11-29	unidentified male	Unknown	Broken Arrow, Oklahoma	During a domestic incident investigation, a man armed with a machete walked toward the police before being shot.
2024-11-28	unidentified male	Unknown	Brea, California	A DUI suspect rammed several police vehicles with his truck as officers surrounded him. Officers fired shots, fatally striking him.
2024-11-28	Joseph DiFusco (56)	White	Ormond Beach, Florida	DiFusco fired more than 200 rounds at neighboring residences and Volusia Sheriff’s Office deputies during a standoff from his condo. After a four hour standoff, a police sniper fatally shot him.
2024-11-28	Jazmir Tucker (15)	Black	Akron, Ohio	Akron police officers heard gunshots nearby and exited their cruiser to investigate. They encountered Tucker. A foot chase ensued after the encounter. Seconds later, one officer fired his rifle, killing Tucker. Police stated Tucker had a gun in a zipped-up pocket. Police did not render aid for several minutes after the shooting.
2024-11-28	Alonso Loya (48)	Hispanic	Phoenix, Arizona	A caller told the police that they were following a possibly armed suspect who harassed another person. Police then found the suspect and attempted to initiate a traffic stop, however, the suspect refused to stop. After a pursuit, the suspect ran into a backyard. A man matching the suspect's description then raised a gun up before being shot and killed by police.
2024-11-27	Alphonso Neal (21)	Black	North Fort Myers, Florida	Deputies were attempting to arrest Neal, a homicide suspect, during a traffic stop. Neal shot at deputies and they fired back, killing him.
2024-11-27	Edgar Ayala Garcia (34)	Hispanic	Arlington, Texas	Garcia was reportedly armed with a knife banging on doors at a Motel 6. Arlington police responded and found a victim was struggling with Garcia, who was still armed at the time. He refused to drop the knife and was fatally shot by two officers.
2024-11-27	Alan Lussier Jr. (37)	Unknown	Red Lake, Minnesota	While Officer Jesse Branch was responding to a crash, he collided with another vehicle. Both himself and the driver of the vehicle died.
2024-11-27	Zander Zephier (23)	Native American	Wagner, South Dakota	Wagner Police responded to numerous active shooter calls. They reportedly killed the shooter.
2024-11-26	Aundre Jones (37)	Black	Los Angeles, California	Jones had been reportedly tailing a DASH bus in the San Pedro area. The driver of the bus was reportedly Jones's former girlfriend. At some point, LAPD reportedly attempted to initiate a traffic stop after spotting Jones' vehicle, but he sped away, commencing in a high speed pursuit. Eventually, the chase ended in the West Adams neighborhood when Jones parked behind an apartment building, exited his vehicle with two handguns in hand, and shot at LAPD on a nearby street. The officers shot Jones. Jones would be taken to a hospital, where he would succumb to his wounds the next day.
2024-11-26	Guy Cruz Jr.	Unknown	Eugene, Oregon	
2024-11-26	Charles Leonard (70)	Unknown	Des Moines, Iowa	A man reportedly threatened a woman on the first floor of a building with an airsoft gun and raised the airsoft gun at the responding officers. Two officers discharged their weapons, killing him.
2024-11-25	Howard Williams（18）	Black	Marksville, Louisiana	Police responded to an initial shooting incident and encountered multiple people. A deputy shot a man under unknown circumstances. The man died at hospital a days later.
2024-11-25	Crystal Price (36)	White	Oklahoma City, Oklahoma	Oklahoma Highway Patrol performed a PIT maneuver on a fleeing vehicle. Two people in the vehicle died as a result of the collision.
2024-11-25	Dario Hendrix (42)	White	Oklahoma City, Oklahoma	Oklahoma Highway Patrol performed a PIT maneuver on a fleeing vehicle. Two people in the vehicle died as a result of the collision.
2024-11-25	Ethan Michael Gosch (34)	Unknown	Kansas City, Missouri	FBI agents shot and killed an armed man when they were serving a warrant.
2024-11-24	Michael Antwiler (60)	Unknown	Joplin, Missouri	Jasper County deputies responded to a domestic disturbance call. Upon arrival, Antwiler reportedly stepped out onto a porch and fired a shotgun at a deputy. The deputy returned fire, fatally striking him.
2024-11-24	Rodney Alan Garcia (34)	Hispanic	Corpus Christi, Texas	When an off-duty officer approached a suspected shoplifter, the suspect drove off and he was dragged by his vehicle. The officer then fired shots, fatally wounding the suspect.
2024-11-24	Jeffrey Blue (45)	White	Ogden, Utah	Ogden City Police responded to a domestic related incident. Upon arrival, they encountered the caller's uncooperative husband, according to police. The man brandished a pellet handgun before being shot.
2024-11-23	Erskine Charles Jenkins (20)	Unknown	Wolfforth, Texas	Police responded to a call about an armed man threatening others. Jenkins, the armed man, reportedly brandished a weapon and was shot by a deputy.
2024-11-23	Marquez Crowder (22)	Black	Bastrop, Louisiana	During a traffic stop, Crowder ran away with a handgun. A deputy fatally shot him.
2024-11-23	Steven Harding (37)	Black	Rochester, Indiana	During a domestic disturbance investigation, Harding reportedly pointed a gun at deputies. The deputies then fatally shot him.
2024-11-23	Daziana Natasha Kian’te Lewis (21)	Black	Greenville, South Carolina	Deputies responded to a reports that Lewis was threatening people outside of an closed Food Lion grocery store. Upon arrival, a verbal altercation ensued. Lewis took out a knife and was shot by a Greenville County Sheriff's deputy. Bodycam video, as well as 911 calls surrounding Lewis's death were released to the public on January 7, 2025
2024-11-22	Charles H. Woodall (52)	White	Canton, Georgia	When Cherokee County Sheriff’s Office was serving several arrest warrants for Woodall, he pointed a gun at them. Despite negotiations efforts, he still refused to drop the gun and was fatally shot by law enforcement officers.
2024-11-22	Eddie Lee Williams III (42)	Black	Malvern, Arkansas	Arkansas State Police attempted to conduct a traffic stop on a vehicle, however, the suspect refused to stop. During the pursuit, state police performed a PIT maneuver on the vehicle which resulted in a collision. The suspect then fired at the troopers with an AR-style rifle before killed by returned fire. The suspect was wanted in an initial shooting incident which injured an individual.
2024-11-22	Morgan Salomone (22)	White	Wantagh, New York	Salomone, a pedestrian, was struck and killed by a police vehicle while crossing the road.
2024-11-22	Rashid Amir Mustafa (58)	Black	Toledo, Ohio	
2024-11-21	Devin Lewis (24)	Black	Springfield, Massachusetts	Police shot and killed Lewis at an apartment building. Police said Lewis was holding two guns when they encountered him. In January 2025, Lewis's brother was arrested for allegedly visiting the homes of two officers involved in the shooting while armed with a gun.
2024-11-21	Andrew Williams (37)	Black	Charleston, South Carolina	Police responded to a fight involving Williams and another man. Upon arrival, officers ordered Williams to show his hands and he pulled out a gun. Both officers opened fire, killing him.
2024-11-21	Robert Bex (60)	White	Sandyville, West Virginia	During a domestic situation, Bex reportedly barricaded himself and fired a shotgun inside the residence. When police attempted to get him to surrender, he reportedly positioned his gun and was ready to fire at them. Deputies fired three shots, killing him.
2024-11-20	unidentified female	Unknown	New York City, New York	An unidentified woman died after she was run over by an NYPD van while lying in the road in East New York, Brooklyn.
2024-11-20	Laurence John Conklin	Unknown	Stevensville, Montana	
2024-11-19	Michael Rose (50)	White	Conover, North Carolina	An armed man reportedly refused to speak with Catawba County Sheriff's Office and threatened to kill himself. When Special Task and Rescue team arrived, they heard a gunshot and entered the home. They shot and killed Rose after he shot at them.
2024-11-19	Keith Alan Beyer (35)	White	Littleton, Colorado	During a traffic stop, the suspect pointed a gun at Littleton police officers before being fatally shot.
2024-11-19	Brandon Raylin Closson (43)	White	Virginia Beach, Virginia	Closson allegedly approached one of a Virginia Beach Police officers with a sharp object before being shot to death. The sharp object is a cutting tool.
2024-11-19	Gary Worthy (57)	Hispanic	Queens, New York City, New York	Worthy allegedly robbed several stores in Queens. When NYPD located him, he shot an officer and a bystander. The officer then fired back, hitting him in the face. He later died in a hospital.
2024-11-19	Brandon Boyd (38)	Hispanic	Long Beach, California	
2024-11-18	Terea Brown (42)	Black	Frankfort, Indiana	Brown reportedly fled a traffic stop. When state troopers surrounded her, she fired a shot from her vehicle, a trooper then fired back. When SWAT team members arrived, they approached the vehicle and found her dead. Brown is suspected of killing a woman outside her home.
2024-11-18	Kristopher Gari (25)	Unknown	Reno, Nevada	While officers were attempting to arrest Gari, a physical altercation ensued which led to the fatal police shooting.
2024-11-18	Timothy Riley (30)	Unknown	Roswell, New Mexico	Police responded to a disturbance call and found Riley entering a vehicle with two children inside. Riley reportedly fired a shot from the vehicle and exited the vehicle with a gun. A police officer then fatally shot Riley during the situation.
2024-11-18	James Vanest (68)	Unknown	Jackson Township, Ohio	Vanest was wanted for federal weapons offense in West Virginia. When US Marshals attempted to arrest him, he barricaded himself and shot a police officer before being fatally shot. The police department in Mansfield later said Vanest was believed to be responsible for the 1981 cold case murder of a woman in her apartment.
2024-11-18	James Kudelka (30)	White	West Haven, Utah	
2024-11-17	David Thomas Digney (24)	White	Perry, Florida	Taylor County Sheriff’s Office deputies pulled over Digney after speeding over 30mph. When Digney was asked to exit the van multiple times, he refused to comply. After a deputy smashed his passenger window to attempt removal, he grabbed a folding knife and rushed towards a deputy. Both deputies then fired a combined five shots, killing him.
2024-11-17	Daniel Jack Monfore (33)	Unknown	Ivins, Utah	A motorcyclist was killed in a collision with a Washington County Sheriff’s Office vehicle.
2024-11-17	Michael Preston Robinson II (30)	Unknown	Winston-Salem, North Carolina	
2024-11-17	Raul Antonio Couto Rivera (42)	Unknown	Town 'n' Country, Florida	Hillsborough County Sheriff’s Office had stopped Rivera for an obscured tag. He exited his car with a gun in his hand before being fatally shot.
2024-11-16	Nyota Koya (66)	Unknown	Sacramento, California	
2024-11-15	Victor Rendon Jr. (34)	Hispanic	Spring Valley, San Diego County, California	A trespassing suspect who was under the influence of drugs or alcohol fired shots and pointed a gun at deputies. Deputies shot and killed him.
2024-11-14	Israel David Price (24)	Unknown	Fair Oaks, California	Sacramento County Sheriff's Office set up a perimeter and tried to get a suspect down a roof. At some point, shots were fired by the suspect. He was later killed by SWAT members.
2024-11-14	Jamorion Seiber (16)	Black	McComb, Mississippi	Police received calls about a suspicious vehicle. When officers located it, two suspects exited the vehicle and one reportedly presented a weapon at the officers before being shot.
2024-11-13	Jason Andre Wilson (23)	Unknown	Fairburn, Georgia	Police chased Wilson after he fled a traffic stop. After police performed a PIT maneuver, Wilson shot at them, striking and killing a police K-9. Wilson also injured a deputy in the shootout before police fatally shot him.
2024-11-13	Christopher Farrell (26)	White	San Diego, California	Farrell fatally shot his ex-girlfriend and her husband shortly before they were all set to appear in court regarding a restraining order. He fled to the Little Italy neighborhood, where he died in a shootout with San Diego Harbor Police. One officer was wounded.
2024-11-13	Shahaud Richmond (21)	Black	Gary, Indiana	A suspect reportedly tried to rob an undercover officer and attacked him with a machete-style weapon during an operation. Another officer shot and killed the suspect.
2024-11-13	unidentified male	Unknown	Phoenix, Arizona	A DEA agent shot and killed a man in a parking lot and arrested two people.
2024-11-13	Peter Greco (65)	White	Fargo, North Dakota	Fargo Police received a report and learned that a suicidal man was armed with a gun inside a home. When he emerged from the home with a handgun, multiple officers opened fire, killing him.
2024-11-12	Brandon Durham (43)	Black	Las Vegas, Nevada	Durham called police to report a woman was attempting to break into his apartment. When an officer arrived, he found Durham and the woman struggling for control of a knife. The officer fired, shooting Durham, then shot at him five more times after he fell to the ground. The woman was charged with home invasion, assault with a deadly weapon, child abuse, and domestic violence.
2024-11-11	Charles Alexander (43)	White	Medina, Ohio	Alexander kidnapped his noncustodial 7-year-old daughter, resulting in an Amber alert. Following a pursuit and attempted negotiations, police fatally shot Alexander.
2024-11-11	Sean Hayes (38)	White	South Burlington, Vermont	Hayes was standing by a curb adjusting his bicycle when a Shelburne Police officer driving on the road struck and killed him. A filing indicated that for 11 minutes prior to the crash, the officer was using his mounted tablet to watch the YouTube video "Trans woman CONFRONTING Matt Walsh takes UNEXPECTED turn". The officer was charged with grossly negligent operation with death resulting.
2024-11-11	Anthony Hernandez (30)	Hispanic	Albuquerque, New Mexico	Hernandez was reportedly waving a handgun and pointing it at his daughter. When officers found him in front of a gas station, he fired a round at them. They returned fire, killing him.
2024-11-11	unidentified male	Unknown	Midland, Texas	A man barricaded himself after reportedly shooting a woman. An officer-involved shooting occurred which left him dead.
2024-11-10	Virginia Lee Morris (38)	White	Waldport, Oregon	Deputies responded to reports of a person firing a rifle from a home and shot Morris after she allegedly exited the home with a firearm.
2024-11-10	Ah Mee Kun (16)	Asian	Fort Wayne, Indiana	Police responded to reports of multiple teenagers with firearms threatening to shoot people. Officers fatally shot one teenager, Kun, after he allegedly refused to follow commands.
2024-11-10	Guadalupe Reyes (47)	Unknown	Boise, Idaho	A suspect was reportedly armed with a knife and threatened a man during a hostage situation. After negotiating with the suspect, the victim safely exited the home. When the suspect emerged armed with a knife, an officer fatally shot him.
2024-11-10	Jonathan Corbin (47)	Black	Philadelphia, Pennsylvania	Corbin reportedly fired a shot during a domestic situation and entered a vehicle belonged to a neighbor. When the neighbor confronted him, he attempted to shoot, however, the gun jammed. When the police arrived, he pointed the gun at the police before being shot and killed.
2024-11-09	Joshua Gallimore (43)	White	Christiansburg, Virginia	Police responded to a call about a man that had set their residence on fire. During the encounter, the man reportedly fled into a woods, brandished a chainsaw, claimed that he had a gun and threatened to shoot the police. He was later shot by the police.
2024-11-09	Mychel Stowers (37)	Black	Saint Paul, Minnesota	Police responded to a laundromat where Stowers, suspected of killing his wife, was reported to be. When Stowers appeared on a bicycle, officers attempted to identify him and shot Stowers, who was armed with a handgun and pointed it at them.
2024-11-09	Charles Franklin Edwards Jr (52)	Unknown	Eagle Lake, Florida	Polk County deputies responded to a domestic battery call. A deputy saw Edwards attacking his wife with a hammer and ordered him to stop. He tased Edwards but he was able to removed the taser probes. Edwards ran at the deputy with the hammer before being fatally shot.
2024-11-09	Kenneth Williams (32)	Black	Raytown, Missouri	
2024-11-08	Henry Wymer (38)	Black	Grand Rapids, Michigan	Officers responded to a call about a man waving a weapon outside Trinity Health Grand Rapids. The shooting happened after they ordered him to drop the gun he was holding. Police claimed that it is a suicide by cop incident.
2024-11-08	John Brown (18)	Unknown	Gardnerville, Nevada	Brown reportedly assaulted his mother with a gun and tried to steal a car with another 16-year-old suspect. When they found Brown inside a car, a shootout occurred which left Brown dead and a deputy injured. The 16-year-old suspect was arrested.
2024-11-08	Ricky Shannon (22)	White	Reed Township, Pennsylvania	Shannon had gone to an apartment and shot three of a woman’s family members who filed a protection order against him, killing one, and kidnapped the woman. After a 40-mile high-speed pursuit, police conducted a PIT maneuver on his pickup truck. At which point Shannon shot a deputy before being killed by returned fire. The woman was also killed by police gunfire. Police claimed the airbags inside the pickup truck prevented them from knowing the woman was inside.
2024-11-08	Gabriella Nicole Morgan (19)	White	Reed Township, Pennsylvania	Shannon had gone to an apartment and shot three of a woman’s family members who filed a protection order against him, killing one, and kidnapped the woman. After a 40-mile high-speed pursuit, police conducted a PIT maneuver on his pickup truck. At which point Shannon shot a deputy before being killed by returned fire. The woman was also killed by police gunfire. Police claimed the airbags inside the pickup truck prevented them from knowing the woman was inside.
2024-11-08	unidentified	Unknown	Lake Charles, Louisiana	A three-vehicle crash involving an off-duty sheriff’s deputy left a person dead.
2024-11-07	Maria Pike (34)	White	Independence, Missouri	Police responded to reports of a domestic disturbance at an apartment, where they encountered a mother holding her two-month-old daughter and a knife. An officer shot at them, killing both.
2024-11-07	Destinii Hope (2-month-old)	White	Independence, Missouri	Police responded to reports of a domestic disturbance at an apartment, where they encountered a mother holding her two-month-old daughter and a knife. An officer shot at them, killing both.
2024-11-07	Corey Robert Drake (28)	Hispanic	Holliday, Texas	Drake barricaded himself in a barn. During the standoff, he shot down two police drones and was fatally shot by a Wichita Falls SWAT officer. He was a double homicide suspect.
2024-11-07	Zachary Labrie (27)	White	Austin, Texas	Labrie reportedly carjacked a vehicle and stole another before being located by Austin Police. When officers ordered him to stop, he shot at them. The officers shot back, killing him.
2024-11-07	Kevin Steinfeldt (58)	White	Plymouth, New Hampshire	Steinfeldt barricaded himself with a rifle inside an inn after officers responded to shots fired calls. During the situation, SWAT team reported that they shot Steinfeldt and he died at the scene. The autopsy shows that he died from a single self-inflicted gunshot wound to the head and was also hit by gunfire fired by the police.
2024-11-06	unidentified male	Unknown	Bowling Green, Kentucky	Two Bowling Green police officers responded to a call about a man suffering mental health crisis. During the encounter, the suspect attempted to disarm an officer and was able to gain control of a gun. He shot both officers before being shot to death.
2024-11-06	Jacob Austin Hikes (31)	White	Jackson, Michigan	Police pursued a man suspected of shooting his brother. During the pursuit, the suspect shot a police officer and threw several pipe bombs at officers before police and sheriff's deputies fatally shot him.
2024-11-05	Ronald Harmon (52)	Black	Philadelphia, Pennsylvania	Two Officers of the University of Pennsylvania observed a suspect who took a package from a residence and fled. One officer chased him on foot while another pursued him with a cruiser. When Harmon came across the cruiser, he turned around in an attempt to flee before the officer on foot tased him. His head hit the road curb causing a “blunt impact head injury.” He died two months later. HIs death had been ruled a homicide. Harmon's family filed a wrongful death suit against the Penn and the Penn Police Department in late 2026, accusing that the use of force violate Penn’s Policies and a taser should not be used on an unarmed man attempting to elude capture by fleeing, who is wanted for a non-violent misdemeanor.
2024-11-05	Rene Mercado Contreras (62)	Unknown	Greer, South Carolina	Greenville County Sheriff's Office received a report about a resident fired at another person who lived at the same home. The suspect reportedly barricaded himself inside the home. During the negotiation, an officer-involved shooting occurred which left the suspect dead. The victim was not injured.
2024-11-05	Jonathan Layton (40)	White	Lindale, Texas	Layton, who was fired from his job, allegedly threatened to kill his employer. When deputies contacted him, he pointed a gun at them before being fatally shot.
2024-11-05	Rey David Martinez (29)	Hispanic	Phoenix, Arizona	Police shot and killed a man who allegedly pointed a replica firearm at them in an alleyway.
2024-11-04	Carlos Fregoso (41)	Unknown	Phoenix, Arizona	A home invasion suspect was fatally shot by Phoenix Police after a brief pursuit. Police stated that he came out of the truck with a gun.
2024-11-04	Bryson E. Kirk (20)	Unknown	Medon, Tennessee	Kirk reportedly shot two women during a domestic situation then took off with an infant in a vehicle. A Tennessee Highway Patrol trooper spotted him but he refused to stop and fired at the trooper. He then discharged his weapon, killing Kirk.
2024-11-04	unidentified male	Unknown	Marianna, Florida	A man who allegedly raised his rifle at Jackson County deputies was fatally shot.
2024-11-03	Keith Edelin (46)	Unknown	Haddon Township, New Jersey	Haddon Township police responded to an attempted burglary call at an apartment complex. A police officer shot and killed the suspect who was armed with a knife in a stairwell.
2024-11-03	Andrew Ward (39)	White	Elizabethtown, Pennsylvania	A man who showed up at a police station with a handgun was fatally shot.
2024-11-02	Paul Rolfes (40)	White	Helena, Montana	A man who barricaded himself in a bar's bathroom was shot and killed after he reportedly stabbed an officer.
2024-11-02	Rayvon Shahid (17)	Black	Flint, Michigan	Flint Post troopers responded to a "threat" at an intersection. When troopers arrived and confronted Shahid, he reportedly ran. For reasons unknown, Shahid was fatally shot. According to police, he was armed with a gun.
2024-11-01	unidentified male	Unknown	Round Rock, Texas	US Marshals shot and killed a person at a McDonald’s for reasons unknown.
2024-11-01	Terry J. Lewis Jr. (36)	Black	Independence, Missouri	A traffic stop escalated to a pursuit after the driver refused to stop. During the chase, the driver collided with a police vehicle on I-70, which caused his death. The officer involved sustained serious injuries.
2024-11-01	Sterling Mark Brantley (68)	White	Bandera County, Texas	Police shot and killed Brantley while they were conducting a welfare check for reasons unknown.
2024-11-01	Jesse Warbonnett (27)	Unknown	Rapid City, South Dakota	Officers responded to reports of a man pointing a gun at people in a Pizza Hut and followed him into a nearby apartment complex, where he continued pointing a gun at others. Police fatally shot the man after he allegedly pointed the gun at them.

== See also ==
- Death in custody § United States
- Henry A. Wallace Police Crime Public Database
- List of cases of police brutality
- List of countries with annual rates and counts for killings by law enforcement officers
- List of law enforcement officers killed in the line of duty in the United States
- List of law enforcement officers convicted for an on-duty killing in the United States
- List of shootings by US immigration agents
- List of police reforms related to the George Floyd protests
- List of unarmed African Americans killed by law enforcement officers in the United States
- Lists of killings by law enforcement officers
- Police brutality in the United States
- Police misconduct § United States
- Police riot § United States
- Police use of deadly force in the United States
