= On a Clear Day You Can See Forever (disambiguation) =

On a Clear Day You Can See Forever is a 1965 musical with music by Burton Lane and book and lyrics by Alan Jay Lerner.

On a Clear Day You Can See Forever may also refer to:

- "On a Clear Day (You Can See Forever)", a song from the musical
- On a Clear Day You Can See Forever (original Broadway cast recording), the 1965 original cast recording of the musical
- On a Clear Day You Can See Forever (film), a 1970 film adapted from the musical
- On a Clear Day You Can See Forever (soundtrack), the 1970 soundtrack of the film
