= My World (Eddy Arnold album) =

Studio album by Eddy Arnold
- Released: 1965
- Genre: Country
- Label: RCA Victor

Eddy Arnold chronology
I'm Throwing Rice... (compilation) (1965)	My World (1965)	I Want to Go with You (1966)

Professional ratings
Review scores
Source	Rating
Record Mirror	4/5 stars

My World is a studio album by country music singer Eddy Arnold. It was released in 1965 by RCA Victor. AllMusic gave the album a rating of three stars.

== Commercial reception ==
The album debuted on Billboard magazine's Top Country Albums chart on October 9, 1965, held the No. 1 spot for 17 weeks, and remained on the chart for a total of 44 weeks. On the Billboard Top LPs the album peaked at No. 7 during a fifty eight-week stay on the chart.

The album included two No. 1 hits: "What's He Doing in My World" and "Make the World Go Away". It was the best selling album of Arnold's career.

== Track listing ==
Side A

1. "What's He Doing in My World"
2. "Too Many Rivers"
3. "It Comes and Goes"
4. "Make the World Go Away"
5. "The Days Gone By"
6. "Mary Claire Melvina Rebecca Jane"

Side B

1. "I'm Letting You Go"
2. "As Usual"
3. "I'm Walking Behind You"
4. "If You Were Mine, Mary"
5. "Taking Chances"
6. "You Still Got a Hold on Me"

== Charts ==
Chart (1965)	Peak position
US Top Country Albums	1
US Billboard Top LPs	7
