= I Want to Go with You =

Single by Eddy Arnold

from the album I Want to Go with You
- B-side: "You'd Better Stop Tellin' Lies (About Me)"
- Released: January 1966
- Genre: Country
- Label: RCA Victor
- Songwriter(s): Hank Cochran
- Producer(s): Chet Atkins

Eddy Arnold singles chronology
| "Make the World Go Away" (1965) | "I Want to Go with You" (1966) | "The Last Word in Lonesome Is Me" (1966) |

"I Want to Go with You" is the title of a popular song from 1966 (see 1966 in music) by the American country music singer Eddy Arnold. The song was written by country music singer-songwriter Hank Cochran.

Released as a single in early 1966, "I Want to Go with You" peaked at No. 36 on the Billboard Hot 100 chart. It was more successful with country and adult contemporary audiences, reaching No. 1 on both the Billboard country chart for six weeks and the easy listening chart for three weeks.

== Charts ==
| Chart (1966) | Peak position |
|---|---|
| US Billboard Hot Country Singles | 1 |
| US Billboard Hot 100 | 36 |
| US Billboard Easy Listening | 1 |
| Canadian RPM Top Singles | 58 |
| Canadian RPM A.C. | 8 |
