= Songs from My Heart.... =

Songs from My Heart...

Studio album by Loretta Lynn
- Released: February 15, 1965
- Recorded: October 1964
- Studio: Columbia (Nashville, Tennessee)
- Genre: Country; Nashville Sound
- Length: 29:26
- Label: Decca
- Producer: Owen Bradley

Loretta Lynn chronology
Before I'm Over You (1964)	Songs from My Heart... (1965)	Blue Kentucky Girl (1965)

Singles from Songs from My Heart...
- 1. "Happy Birthday" Released: November 1964

Songs from My Heart.... is a studio album by American country singer-songwriter Loretta Lynn. It was released on February 15, 1965 via Decca Records and was produced by Owen Bradley. It was Lynn's third studio album released in her career and contained a total of 12 tracks. The album charted on the Billboard albums chart following its release and contained one single. The song, "Happy Birthday" became a major hit on the Billboard country chart in 1965.

== Background and content ==
By 1965, Loretta Lynn had issued three albums at Decca Records and had several major hits at the label. Lynn's hits up to this point included "Success," "Before I'm Over You" and "Wine, Women and Song." Under the production of Owen Bradley, Lynn's early musical style incorporated the Nashville Sound and elements of traditional country music. These styles were seen on Songs from My Heart.... The album was recorded at the Columbia Studios in Nashville, Tennessee. The sessions took place in October 1964 and were all produced by Bradley.

Songs from My Heart... contained 12 tracks. Two of the album's recordings were composed by Lynn herself: "When Lonely Hits Your Heart" and "It Just Looks That Way". Another track entitled "You Made What I Am" was composed by her husband, Oliver Lynn. Additional tracks were written by other songwriters and some of the featured tracks were covers of previously recorded songs. Covers included "Once a Day," which was a number one country hit for Connie Smith. Additionally, a cover of Roger Miller's "Half a Mind" and Don Gibson's "Oh, Lonesome Me" is also featured on the album.

== Release and reception ==
Professional ratings
Review scores
Source	Rating
Allmusic	3/5 stars
Billboard	Favorable

Songs from My Heart was released on February 15, 1965 on Decca Records, becoming Lynn's third studio album release. The album was issued as a vinyl LP record, containing six songs on each side. It was Lynn's third studio effort to reach the Billboard Top Country Albums, where it peaked at number eight. It was also Lynn's second album to chart in the country top ten. The album was rated positively by Allmusic, who gave it three out of five stars. Billboard magazine, also gave it a positive review and commented on Lynn's significance to the country genre: "one of country music's finest artists, Loretta Lynn captures the true meaning of all country music, with warm deep feeling renditions..." The album contained a single which became a major hit following the album's release: "Happy Birthday." It was released as a single in November 1964. The song reached number three on the Billboard Hot Country Singles chart in early 1965.

== Track listing ==
Side one
No.	Title	Writer(s)	Length
1.	"Happy Birthday"	Ron Kitson	2:03
2.	"When Lonely Hits Your Heart"	Loretta Lynn	2:38
3.	"You've Made Me What I Am"	Oliver Lynn	2:45
4.	"Once a Day"	Bill Anderson	2:20
5.	"You're the Only Good Thing"	Jack Toomes	2:34
6.	"It Just Looks That Way"	L. Lynn	2:08

Side two
No.	Title	Writer(s)	Length
1.	"I Don't Believe I'll Fall in Love Today"	Harlan Howard	2:25
2.	"Half a Mind"	Roger Miller	2:30
3.	"Oh, Lonesome Me"	Don Gibson	2:45
4.	"Boys Like You"	Thomas Glaser	2:19
5.	"When Dreams Go Out of Style"	Margie Bowes	2:23
6.	"A Wound Time Can't Erase"	Bill D. Johnson	2:36

== Personnel ==
All credits are adapted from the liner notes of Songs from My Heart....

Musical personnel

- Harold Bradley – electric bass guitar, electric guitar
- Floyd Cramer – piano
- Buddy Harman – drums
- Don Helms – steel guitar
- Junior Huskey – bass
- The Jordanaires – backing vocals
- Jerry Kennedy – guitar
- Loretta Lynn – lead vocals
- Grady Martin – electric guitar
- Bob Moore – bass
- Harold Morrison – guitar
- Wayne Moss – guitar
- Pete Wade – guitar

Technical personnel

- Owen Bradley – producer
- Hal Buksbaum – photography

== Chart performance ==
Chart (1965)	Peak position
US Top Country Albums (Billboard)	8

== Release history ==
Region	Date	Format	Label	Ref.
United States	February 15, 1965	Vinyl	Decca Records	
