= Is It Wrong (For Loving You) =

Single by Sonny James

from the album When the Snow Is on the Roses
- B-side: "Suddenly There's a Valley"
- Released: February 1974
- Recorded: June 5, 1972
- Genre: Country
- Length: 3:03
- Label: Columbia 4-46003
- Songwriter(s): Warner MacPherson
- Producer(s): George Richey

Sonny James singles chronology
"If She Just Helps Me Get Over You" (1973)	"Is It Wrong (For Loving You)" (1974)	"A Mi Esposa Con Amor" (1974)

"Is It Wrong (For Loving You)" is a song written by Warner Mack. Mack recorded the song in 1957, and reached No. 9 on the Billboard country charts and spent 36 weeks on the chart.

== Cover Versions ==
"Is It Wrong (For Loving You)" was recorded by a number of artists:

- In 1960, it was covered by Webb Pierce and peaked at No. 11 on the country charts.
- Sonny James recorded a cover version in 1972, shortly after signing with Columbia Records. In the winter of 1974, he released the song as a single, and it eventually became the final of 24 number ones on the country chart. The single stayed at number one for a single week and spent a total of 11 weeks on the country chart.

== Chart performance ==
=== Warner Mack ===
Chart (1958)	Peak position
U.S. Billboard Hot Country Singles	9
U.S. Billboard Hot 100	61

=== Webb Pierce ===
Chart (1960)	Peak position
U.S. Billboard Hot Country Singles	11
U.S. Billboard Hot 100	69

=== Sonny James ===
Chart (1974)	Peak position
U.S. Billboard Hot Country Singles	1
Canadian RPM Country Tracks	75
