= Blue Kentucky Girl (Loretta Lynn album) =

Studio album by Loretta Lynn
- Released: June 14, 1965
- Recorded: January 9, 1963 – March 16, 1965
- Studio: Columbia (Nashville, Tennessee)
- Genre: Country
- Length: 27:34
- Label: Decca
- Producer: Owen Bradley

Loretta Lynn chronology
Songs from My Heart.... (1965)	Blue Kentucky Girl (1965)	Mr. and Mrs. Used to Be (1965)

Singles from Blue Kentucky Girl
- 1. "Blue Kentucky Girl" Released: March 29, 1965

Blue Kentucky Girl is the fourth studio album by American country music singer-songwriter Loretta Lynn. It was released on June 14, 1965, by Decca Records.

The album features four songs written by Lynn: "Night Girl," "Love's Been Here and Gone," "Farther to Go," and "Two Steps Forward." It also includes cover versions of two previous country hits: Connie Smith's "Then and Only Then" and Johnny Cash's "I Still Miss Someone."

== Critical reception ==
Professional ratings
Review scores
Source	Rating
Allmusic	3/5 stars

In the June 26, 1965 issue, Billboard published a review of the album, which stated, "Her current hit is "Blue Kentucky Girl" and this album is a beautiful showcase for not only that tune, but the classic "Send Me the Pillow That You Dream On" and "I Still Miss Someone" sung with impact and vivaciousness by the Grand Ole Opry's Loretta Lynn. The hit will make this a strong seller in the country music field."

== Commercial performance ==
The album debuted at No. 18 on the US Billboard Hot Country Albums chart dated July 10, 1965. It reached its peak at No. 14 the following week and spent a total of 8 weeks on the chart.

The only single from the album, "Blue Kentucky Girl," was released in March 1965 and reached No. 7 on the US Billboard Hot Country Singles chart.

== Recording ==
Recording of the album took place over three sessions on March 4, 15, and 16, 1965, at the Columbia Recording Studios in Nashville, Tennessee. Two songs on the album had been previously recorded during sessions for other albums. "Blue Kentucky Girl" was recorded on October 14, 1964, during a session for 1965's Songs from My Heart...., while "The Beginning of the End" was recorded on January 9, 1963, as part of the session for 1963's Loretta Lynn Sings.

== Track listing ==
Side one
No.	Title	Writer(s)	Recording date	Length
1.	"Blue Kentucky Girl"	Johnny Mullins	October 14, 1964	2:27
2.	"Then and Only Then"	Bill Anderson	March 15, 1965	2:22
3.	"I Still Miss Someone"	Johnny Cash; Roy Cash, Jr.	March 15, 1965	2:11
4.	"Night Girl"	Loretta Lynn; Teddy Wilburn	March 15, 1965	2:40
5.	"Love's Been Here and Gone"	Lynn; Wilburn	March 16, 1965	2:35
6.	"Farther to Go"	Lynn	March 4, 1965	2:24

Side two
No.	Title	Writer(s)	Recording date	Length
1.	"The Race Is On"	Don Rollins	March 16, 1965	2:22
2.	"I Won't Forget You"	Harlan Howard	March 15, 1965	2:03
3.	"Two Steps Forward"	Lynn	March 4, 1965	2:09
4.	"Send Me the Pillow That You Dream On"	Hank Locklin	March 16, 1965	1:59
5.	"The Beginning of the End"	Betty Sue Perry	January 9, 1963	2:22
6.	"Today"	Hank Thompson	March 16, 1965	2:00

== Personnel ==
Adapted from the Decca recording session records.

- Willie Ackerman – drums
- Harold Bradley – electric bass guitar, electric guitar
- Floyd Cramer – piano
- Buddy Harman – drums
- Don Helms – steel guitar
- Junior Huskey – bass
- The Jordanaires – backing vocals
- Loretta Lynn – lead vocals
- Grady Martin – guitar
- Bob Moore – bass
- Harold Morrison – banjo
- Wayne Moss – guitar, electric guitar
- Hal Rugg – steel guitar
- Teddy Wilburn – guitar

== Charts ==
Album

Chart (1965)	Peak position
US Hot Country Albums (Billboard)	14

Singles

Title	Year	Peak position
Title	Year	US Country
"Blue Kentucky Girl"	1965	7
