= I Want to Go with You (album) =

Studio album by Eddy Arnold
- Released: 1966
- Genre: Country
- Label: RCA Victor
- Producer: Chet Atkins

Eddy Arnold chronology
My World (1965)	I Want to Go with You (1966)	The Last Word in Lonesome (1966)

Professional ratings
Review scores
Source	Rating
Record Mirror	4/5 stars

I Want to Go with You is a studio album by American country music singer Eddy Arnold released by RCA Victor in 1966.

== Overview ==
It reached #1 in the US country charts and No. 26 in the Billboard 200 charts. Released as a single in early 1966, the title track "I Want to Go with You" peaked at No. 36 on the Billboard Hot 100 chart. It was more successful with country and adult contemporary audiences, reaching No. 1 on both the Billboard country chart for six weeks and the easy listening chart for three weeks.

== Track listing ==
Side 1

1. "I Want to Go with You" (Hank Cochran)
2. "Love Me Like That" (Don Deal)
3. "Somebody Loves You" (Charles Tobias, Peter DeRose)
4. "Good-Bye Sunshine" (Cindy Walker)
5. "Don't Forget I Still Love You" (Guy Louis)
6. "After Losing You" (Lee McAlpine)

Side 2

1. "Come Live with Me and Be My Love" (Cindy Walker)
2. "A Good Woman's Love" (Cy Coben)
3. "One Kiss for Old Times Sake" (Arthur Resnick, Kenny Young)
4. "I'll Always Be in Love with You" (Bud Green, Herman Ruby, Sam H. Stept)
5. "Pardon Me" (Gordon Galbraith, Ricci Mareno)
6. "You'd Better Stop Tellin' Lies (About Me)" (Vaughn Horton)

== Production ==
- Arranged and Conducted by Billy Walker
- Produced by Chet Atkins
- Recorded at RCA Victor's “Nashville Sound” studio, Nashville, Tennessee.
- Recording Engineer: Jim Malloy
- Cover illustration - Mike Ludow

== Charts ==
Chart (1966)	Peak position
US Top Country LPs	1
US Billboard Top LPs	26
