= Harold Morrison =

American country music singer

- Born: Harold Ralph Morrison; January 30, 1931; High Lonesome, near Chadwick, Missouri, United States
- Died: December 21, 1993 (aged 62) Springfield, Missouri, United States
- Genres: Country; Bluegrass
- Occupations: Singer-songwriter, musician, comedian
- Instruments: Acoustic guitar; banjo; dobro; Steel guitar
- Years active: 1950–1992
- Labels: Columbia; Decca; RCA Victor

Harold Morrison (January 30, 1931 – December 21, 1993) was an American country music singer-songwriter and session musician. He played banjo, dobro, and guitar on albums with musicians such as Loretta Lynn, Kitty Wells, The Wilburn Brothers, and Tammy Wynette. Throughout his musical career, Morrison was a cast member and recurring guest on multiple country music television shows, such as the Ozark Jubilee, the "Wilburn Brothers Show," and The Porter Wagoner Show.

== Biography ==
=== Early life ===
Harold Ralph Morrison was born on January 30, 1931, in High Lonesome, a rural town in Christian County, Missouri, forty miles southeast of Springfield. His father was a farm laborer and his mother was a housewife. Morrison began playing banjo and guitar at an early age.

=== Career ===
In 1950, Morrison began performing on local radio stations in Springfield, and by 1951, he was performing as a duo with fiddler and guitarist, Jimmy Gateley. They worked with the Red River Rustlers on KJSB radio in Jamestown, North Dakota. Later, they moved to Wheeling, West Virginia, where they worked with WWVA (AM) radio. During this time, they occasionally performed with Dusty Owens' music group. In 1954, they recorded sessions with Owens' band for Columbia Records before returning to Springfield in 1955 to join the cast of the Ozark Jubilee. In 1955, Morrison and Gateley also went on tour with Red Foley. During this time, Morrison performed as a session musician for several studios, playing steel guitar with The Browns on their recording of "I Take the Chance", as well as playing the banjo on multiple Porter Wagoner songs.

By 1957, Morrison and his family relocated to Nashville, Tennessee, where he performed on the steel guitar and dobro with Kitty Wells on several Decca recordings, including her version of "I Can't Stop Loving You". He also recorded with Johnnie Wright for RCA Victor. Morrison was a touring member of both Wells's and Wright's bands. In the early 1960s, he became a member of The Wilburn Brothers, touring with them and co-hosting their television series, "The Wilburn Brothers Show". In the mid-1960s, Morrison recorded instrumental work and comedy routines for Decca Records, which were compiled and released as "Hoss, He's the Boss" in 1965. That year, he played the banjo on Loretta Lynn's song "Blue Kentucky Girl". Two years later, in 1967, he performed with the Maple Hill Boys, releasing the single "Opry Theme" under Epic records. It was the first time the Grand Ole Opry had allowed its theme to be recorded. In 1969, Morrison became a member of George Jones and Tammy Wynette's band, touring with them until their 1975 split. After 1975, Morrison continued touring with Wynette's band. In the early 1970s, Morrison was an occasional guest on The Porter Wagoner Show.

In 1975, Morrison, his daughter Karla, and Benny Williams formed the Smokin' bluegrass music group. The group went on tour for several years, appearing at many of the larger bluegrass festivals and winning several competitions. After the group broke up, Morrison continued playing with several different groups. In 1985, Morrison performed under his own name in Branson, Missouri. In 1989, he played with Ferlin Husky, performing at their theater in Myrtle Beach, South Carolina, until Hurricane Hugo destroyed the building. He then played with Grandpa Jones for a few years. In 1992, Morrison formed another band under his own name.

=== Death ===
Morrison died of heart failure on December 21, 1993, in Springfield, Missouri, following a cerebral hemorrhage. He was 62 years old.

== Discography ==
Year	Album	Band	Contribution
1965	"Hoss, He's the Boss"	Harold Morrison	Primary Artist
1966	"The Wilburn Brothers Show with Loretta Lynn & Harold Morrison"	The Wilburn Brothers	Composer, Primary Artist
1967	"Opry Theme"	Harold Morrison and the Maple Hill Boys	Primary Artist
1978	"Ever Ready"	Johnnie Taylor	Composer
1989	"The Thin Man from the West Plains: The RCA Sessions 1952-1962"	Porter Wagoner & the Wagonmasters	Banjo
1992	"Johnnie & Jack and the Tennessee Mountain Boys"	Johnnie & Jack	Baritone (Vocal), Guitar, Slide Guitar, Banjo, Composer
1993	"The Three Bells"	The Browns	Guitar (Steel), Dobro
1994	"Honky Tonk Girl: The Loretta Lynn Collection"	Loretta Lynn	Guitar
1994	"Queen of Country Music [Box Set]"	Kitty Wells	Guitar (Steel), Banjo
1996	"Rated X-Traordinaire: The Best of Johnnie Taylor"	Johnnie Taylor	Composer
2002	"RCA Country Legends"	Porter Wagoner	Banjo
2003	"For Old Times Sake [Bear Family]"	Johnnie & Jack	Baritone (Vocal), Guitar, Guitar (Steel)
2003	"World's Greatest Bluegrass Live"	Various Artists	Primary Artist
2005	"Best of Johnnie & Jack"	Johnnie & Jack	Baritone (Vocal)
2008	"Country Instrumentals [Reader's Digest Music]"	Various Artists	Primary Artist
2008	"Harold Morrison and the Maple Hill Boys - All the Good Times"	Harold Morrison	Primary Artist
2009	"A Country Music Odyssey"	The Browns	Banjo, Dobro, Guitar (Steel)
2010	"Dim Lights, Thick Smoke and Hillbilly Music: 1956"	Various Artists	Guitar (Steel)
2010	"Dim Lights, Thick Smoke and Hillbilly Music: 1958"	Various Artists	Baritone (Vocal), Guitar (Steel)
2011	"Dim Lights, Thick Smoke and Hillbilly Music: 1961"	Various Artists	Banjo
2011	"Dim Lights, Thick Smoke and Hillbilly Music: 1965"	Various Artists	Banjo
2011	"Your Squaw Is on the Warpath/Fist City"	Loretta Lynn	Banjo
2012	"Rockabilly Boogie"	Various Artists	Composer, Primary Artist
2013	"Dim Lights, Thick Smoke and Hillbilly Music: 1968"	Various Artists	Banjo
2018	"Epic Singles"	Harold Morrison	Primary Artist
2020	"Johnnie & Jack Collection: 1945-1962"	Johnnie & Jack	Composer
