= On a Clear Day You Can See Forever (original Broadway cast recording) =

Cast recording by various artists
- Released: 1965
- Genre: Show tunes
- Label: RCA Victor
- Producers: Joe Linhart and George R. Marek

On a Clear Day You Can See Forever, subtitled The Original Broadway Cast Recording, is an album containing a recording of the 1965 Broadway musical On a Clear Day You Can See Forever made by its original cast. The album was released by RCA Victor on November 1, 1965.

== Critical reception ==
Professional ratings
Review scores
Source	Rating
AllMusic	4.5/5 stars
Audio	(favorable)
Billboard	(favorable)
High Fidelity	(favorable)

Billboard picked the album for review, calling it "a noteworthy addition to the musical theater shelf." The reviewer noted: "Lane's charming melodies and Lerner's sharp and witty lyrics get standout showcasing by the principals, Barbara Harris and John Cullum. Other cast members also shine in this topnotch disk."

== Chart performance ==
The album reached number 59 on the Billboard's Top LPs chart.

== Track listing ==
LP – RCA Victor LOCD 2006 (mono), LSOD 2006 (stereo)

All lyrics are written by Alan Jay Lerner; all music is composed by Burton Lane.

Side 1
No.	Title	Artist(s)	Length
1.	"Overture"	Orchestra and chorus	6:10
2.	"Hurry! It's Lovely Up Here!"	Barbara Harris and John Cullum	4:04
3.	"Tosy and Cosh"	Barbara Harris	2:58
4.	"On a Clear Day (You Can See Forever)"	John Cullum	3:55
5.	"On the S. S. Bernard Cohn"	Barbara Harris, Barbara Monte, William Reilly and Gerald M. Teijelo	4:30
6.	"Don't Tamper with My Sister"	Clifford David, Byron Webster and chorus	2:19

Side 2
No.	Title	Artist(s)	Length
1.	"She Wasn't You"	Clifford David	3:20
2.	"Melinda"	John Cullum	4:10
3.	"When I'm Being Born Again"	Titos Vandis	3:14
4.	"What Did I Have That I Don't Have?"	Barbara Harris	4:15
5.	"Wait Till We're Sixty-Five"	William Daniels and Barbara Harris	2:45
6.	"Come Back to Me"	John Cullum	2:20
7.	"Finale"	Entire cast	2:37

- Orchestra conducted by Theodore Saidenberg

== Charts ==
Chart (1966)	Peak position
US Billboard Top LPs	59

== Awards ==
Year	Award type	Categories	Results	Ref.
1966	Grammy Awards	Best Score from an Original Cast Show Album	Won	
