= The Jim Reeves Way =

Studio album by Jim Reeves
- Released: 1965
- Genre: Country
- Label: RCA Victor
- Producer: Chet Atkins, Bob Ferguson

Jim Reeves chronology
Have I Told You Lately That I Love You? (1964)	The Jim Reeves Way (1965)	Up Through the Years (1965)

Professional ratings
Review scores
Source	Rating
AllMusic	3/5 stars
Record Mirror	4/5 stars
The Virgin Encyclopedia of Country Music	3/5 stars

The Jim Reeves Way is a studio album by Jim Reeves, released posthumously in 1965 on RCA Victor. It was produced by Chet Atkins and Bob Ferguson.

The album included 12 tracks, among which "Make the World Go Away" and "Maureen".

The album opens with a cover of Hank Cochran's song "Make the World Go Away", recorded by Reeves at his last recording session in July 1964.

"I Can't Stop Loving You" is another song from that session and is in fact the last song Reeves ever recorded:
When the session ended with some time remaining on the schedule, Reeves suggested that he should record one more song. And he taped "I Can't Stop Loving You".

== Track listing ==
No.	Title	Writer(s)	Length
1.	"Make the World Go Away"	Hank Cochran
2.	"In the Misty Moonlight"	Cindy Walker
3.	"You'll Never Know"	Mack Gordon / Harry Warren
4.	"There's That Smile Again"	Benny Davis / Jim Reeves
5.	"Bolandse nooientjie"	Jim Reeves
6.	"It Hurts So Much (to See You Go)"	Bob Moore / Jim Reeves / Bobby Warren
7.	"I Can't Stop Loving You"	Don Gibson
8.	"A Nickel Piece of Candy"	Alex Zanetis
9.	"Where Do I Go to Throw a Picture Away"	Carl Belew / Jim Reeves
10.	"Maureen"	Robert B. Sherman
11.	"Ek verlang na jou"
12.	"Somewhere Along the Line"	Jim Reeves / Jimmy Tipton

== Charts ==
Chart (1964–1965)	Peak position
US Billboard 200	45
US Top Country Albums (Billboard)	2

== Awards and nominations ==
Award	Year (Note: Indicates the year of ceremony.)	Category	Result	Ref.
Billboard Country Music Awards	1965	Favorite Album (1964–'65)	Nominated	
Grammy Awards	1966	Best Country & Western Album	Nominated	
