= Happy Birthday (Loretta Lynn song) =

1964 single by Loretta Lynn

"Happy Birthday (Merry Christmas and Happy New Year)"

Single by Loretta Lynn

from the album Songs from My Heart....
- B-side: "When Lonely Hits Your Heart"
- Released: November 1964
- Recorded: October 14, 1964
- Studio: Columbia (Nashville, Tennessee)
- Genre: Country
- Label: Decca
- Songwriter: Ron Kitson
- Producer: Owen Bradley

Loretta Lynn singles chronology
"Wine Women and Song" (1964)	"Happy Birthday (Merry Christmas and Happy New Year)" (1964)	"Blue Kentucky Girl" (1965)

"Happy Birthday (Merry Christmas and Happy New Year)" is a country song written by Ron Kitson, published by Sure-Fire Music, and recorded by Loretta Lynn in the fall of 1964 and released before Christmas of that year on Decca Records as a 45-rpm single.

"Happy Birthday" continued its rise up the country charts into 1965, reaching number three on the Billboard Country Charts. "Happy Birthday" spent 15 weeks in the top ten and received a BMI award in 1965.

The song was included on Lynn's 1964 album Songs from My Heart.... and again in 1968 on Lynn's first greatest hits album, as well as appearing on many of Lynn's greatest hits CD collections. According to Kitson, "I first sang the song to Loretta back stage at the Horse Shoe Nightclub where she was appearing in Toronto, Ontario and she wanted a tape of it which she took back to Nashville where she recorded it a few weeks later. She first performed it on the Grand Ole Opry with Connie Smith providing harmony during the DJ Convention in Nashville in October 1964."
