= Bolt, West Virginia =

- Census-designated place (CDP)
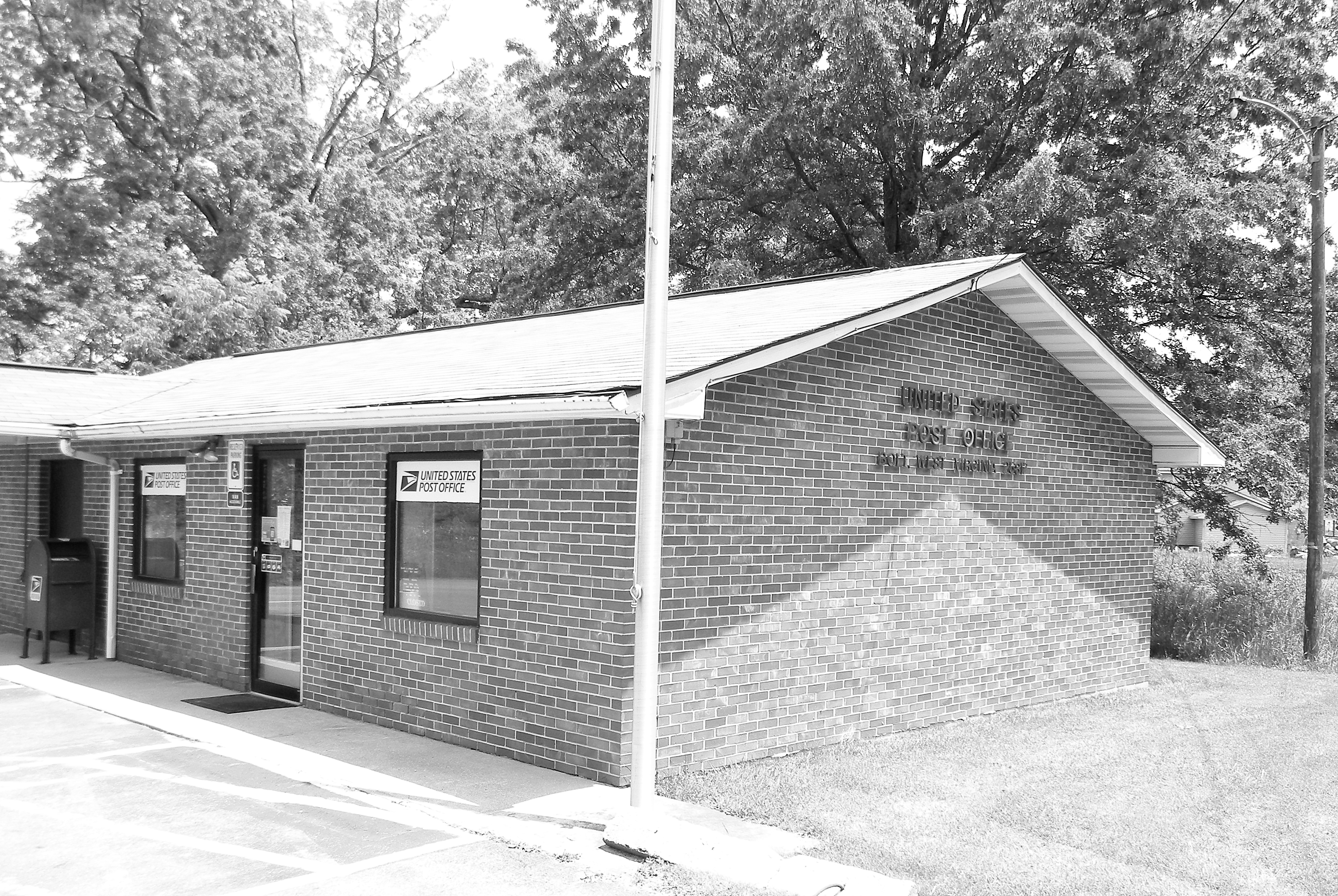
- Bolt West Virginia Post Office

- Location within West Virginia
- Coordinates: 37°45′24″N 81°24′54″W
- Country: United States
- State: West Virginia
- County: Raleigh

Area
  - Total: 5.451 sq mi (14.12 km^{2})
  - Land: 5.445 sq mi (14.10 km^{2})
  - Water: 0.006 sq mi (0.016 km^{2})
- Elevation: 2,074 ft (632 m)

Population (2020)
  - Total: 518
  - Density: 95.1/sq mi (36.7/km^{2})
- Time zone: UTC-5 (Eastern (EST))
  - Summer (DST): UTC-4 (EDT)
- ZIP code: 25817
- Area codes: 304 & 681
- GNIS feature ID: 2586767

Bolt is a census-designated place (CDP) in Raleigh County, West Virginia, United States. Bolt is located on West Virginia Route 99, 12 miles (19 km) west of Beckley. Bolt has a post office with ZIP code 25817. As of the 2020 census, its population is 518 (down from 548 at the 2010 census).

== History ==
A post office called Bolt has been in operation since 1902. One Mr. George Washington Bolt, an early postmaster, gave the community his last name.

== Notable person ==
Little Jimmy Dickens, a country singer, was born in Bolt in 1920.
