= The Bridge Washed Out =

Single by Warner Mack

from the album The Bridge Washed Out
- B-side: "Biggest Part of Me"
- Released: April 1965
- Genre: Country
- Label: Decca
- Songwriter(s): Mel Melshee, Jimmy Louis, Sandra Smith and Slim Williamson
- Producer(s): Owen Bradley

Warner Mack singles chronology
"Sittin' in an All Nite Cafe" (1964)	"The Bridge Washed Out" (1965)	"Sittin' on a Rock (Cryin' in a Creek)" (1965)

"The Bridge Washed Out" is a 1965 single by Warner Mack. "The Bridge Washed Out" was Mack's fourth release to hit the U.S. country singles chart and his only number one. The song spent a single week at the top and a total of 22 weeks on the chart.

== Chart performance ==
Chart (1965)	Peak position
U.S. Billboard Hot Country Singles	1
