= Behind the Tear =

Single by Sonny James

from the album Behind the Tear
- B-side: "Runnin'"
- Released: June 1965
- Genre: Country
- Label: Capitol
- Songwriter(s): Ned Miller; Sue Miller
- Producer(s): Marvin Hughes

Sonny James singles chronology
"I'll Keep Holding On (Just to Your Love)" (1965)	"Behind the Tear" (1965)	"True Love's a Blessing" (1965)

"Behind the Tear" is a 1965 single by Sonny James. The single was Sonny James's third number one on the U.S. country music chart. "Behind the Tear" spent three non-consecutive weeks at number one and a total of twenty weeks on the country chart.

== Chart performance ==
Chart (1965)	Peak position
U.S. Billboard Hot Country Singles	1
U.S. Billboard Bubbling Under Hot 100	13
