= Yes, Mr. Peters =

Single by Roy Drusky and Priscilla Mitchell

from the album Love's Eternal Triangle
- B-side: "More Than We Deserve"
- Released: May 3, 1965
- Genre: Country
- Length: 2:53
- Label: Mercury
- Songwriter(s): Steve Karliski; Larry Kolber
- Producer(s): Jerry Kennedy

Roy Drusky singles chronology
| "(From Now On All My Friends Are Gonna Be) Strangers" (1965) | "Yes, Mr. Peters" (1965) | "White Lightnin' Express" (1965) |

Priscilla Mitchell singles chronology
| "Yes, Mr. Peters" (1965) | "Slippin' Around" (1965) |

"Yes, Mr. Peters" is a song written by Steve Karliski and Larry Kolber, and recorded by American country music artists Roy Drusky and Priscilla Mitchell as a duet. It was released in May 1965 as the lead single from the album, Love's Eternal Triangle. The single was Drusky's only number-one hit, spending two weeks atop the Hot Country Songs charts. It was also the only top-40 entry for Mitchell, and one of three duets that she recorded with Drusky.

== Content ==
The song discusses a love triangle, with a married businessman (Drusky in the hit version) taking a phone call from his girlfriend (Mitchell). As only the listener is able to hear the girlfriend's side of the conversation—for instance, asking when she can expect to meet her boyfriend—and that presumably others cannot hear her end of the conversation, the businessman is able to disguise the conversation through responses that lead others to believe he is headed to the office for a meeting with "Mr. Peters".

== Reception ==
In 1965, Lorene Mann and Justin Tubb recorded an answer song titled "Hurry, Mr. Peters", for their duets album Together and Alone. This song peaked at number 23 on the country charts.

== Chart performance ==
| Chart (1965) | Peak position |
|---|---|
| U.S. Billboard Hot Country Singles | 1 |
| Chart (1969) | Peak position |
| Australia (Kent Music Report) | 51 |
