= Little Jimmy Dickens =

American country music singer-songwriter (1920–2015)

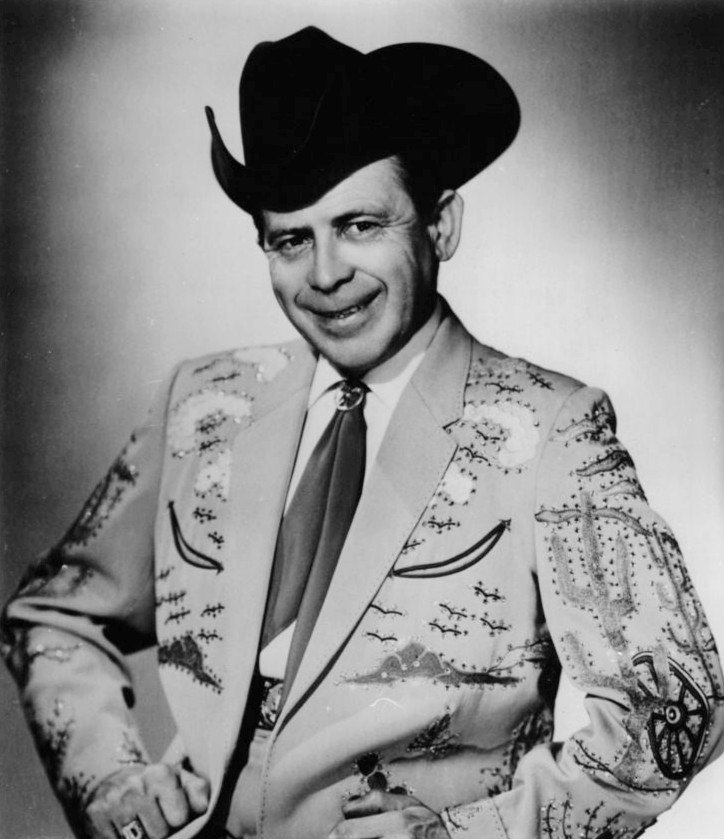
- Dickens in 1971

Background information
- Also known as: Tater
- Born: James Cecil Dickens; December 19, 1920; Bolt, West Virginia, U.S.
- Died: January 2, 2015 (aged 94) Nashville, Tennessee, U.S.
- Genre: Country
- Occupations: Singer, songwriter
- Instrument: Guitar
- Years active: 1936–2015
- Labels: Columbia Records; Decca Records; United Artists Records

James Cecil Dickens (December 19, 1920 – January 2, 2015), better known by his stage name Little Jimmy Dickens, was an American country music singer and songwriter famous for his humorous novelty songs, his small size (4'10" [150 cm]), and his rhinestone-studded outfits (which he is given credit for introducing into live country music performances). He started as a member of the Grand Ole Opry in 1948 and was inducted into the Country Music Hall of Fame in 1983. Before his death, he was the oldest living member of the Grand Ole Opry.

== Early life ==
Dickens was born on December 19, 1920 in Bolt, West Virginia. He began his musical career in the late 1930s, performing on radio station WJLS in Beckley, West Virginia, while attending West Virginia University. On the radio station, he got his experience with performers such as Mel Steele, Molly O'Day, and Johnnie Bailes. In the 1940s, Jimmy hosted his own radio programs in places including West Virginia, Indiana, Kansas, and even Ohio. He soon quit school to pursue a full-time music career, traveling the country performing on local radio stations under the name "Jimmy the Kid".

== Career ==
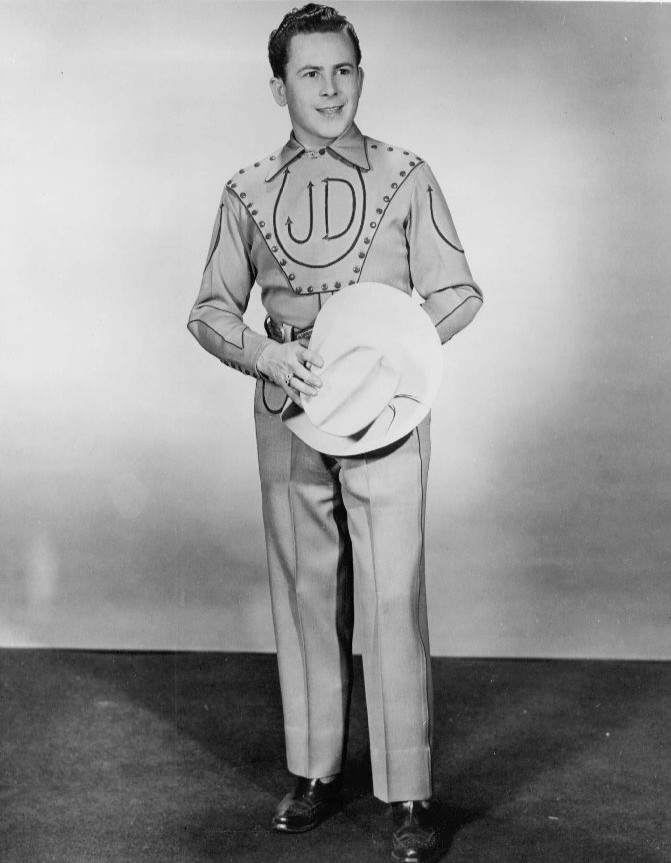
Dickens in 1955

In 1948, Dickens was heard performing on WKNX, a radio station in Saginaw, Michigan, while on location at Buck Lake Ranch, Angola, Indiana. Roy Acuff introduced him to Art Satherley at Columbia Records and to officials from the Grand Ole Opry. Dickens signed with Columbia in September and joined the Opry in August. Around this time, he began using the nickname Little Jimmy Dickens, inspired by his short stature.

Dickens recorded many novelty songs for Columbia, including "Country Boy", "A-Sleeping at the Foot of the Bed", and "I'm Little but I'm Loud". His song "Take an Old Cold Tater (And Wait)" inspired Hank Williams to nickname him Tater. Later, telling Dickens he needed a hit, Williams wrote "Hey Good Lookin'" in only 20 minutes while on a plane with Dickens, Minnie Pearl, and Pearl's husband, Henry Cannon. A week later, Williams recorded the song himself, jokingly telling Dickens, "That song's too good for you!", to which Dickens replied, "Much obliged, Hiram."

In 1950, Dickens formed the Country Boys with musicians Jabbo Arrington, Grady Martin, Bob Moore, and Thumbs Carllile. During this time, he discovered future Country Music Hall of Famer Marty Robbins at a Phoenix, Arizona, television station while on tour with the Grand Ole Opry road show. In 1957, Dickens left the Grand Ole Opry to tour with the Philip Morris Country Music Show.

In 1962, Dickens had his first top-10 country hit since 1954 with "The Violet and a Rose".

In 1964, he became the first country artist to circle the globe while on tour. He also made numerous appearances on television, including on The Tonight Show Starring Johnny Carson. In 1965, he released his biggest hit, "May the Bird of Paradise Fly Up Your Nose", which reached number one on the country chart and number 15 on the pop chart.

In the late 1960s, Dickens left Columbia for Decca Records, before moving again to United Artists in 1971. That same year, he married his wife, Mona, and in 1975, he returned to the Grand Ole Opry. In 1983, Dickens was inducted into the Country Music Hall of Fame.

Dickens joined producers Randall Franks and Alan Autry for the In the Heat of the Night cast CD Christmas Time's a Comin’, performing "Jingle Bells" with the cast. The CD released by Sonlite and MGM/UA was one of the most popular Christmas releases of 1991 and 1992 with Southern retailers.

=== Later career ===
In 1984, Dickens appeared in Hank Williams Jr.'s music video for the hit single "All My Rowdy Friends Are Coming Over Tonight".

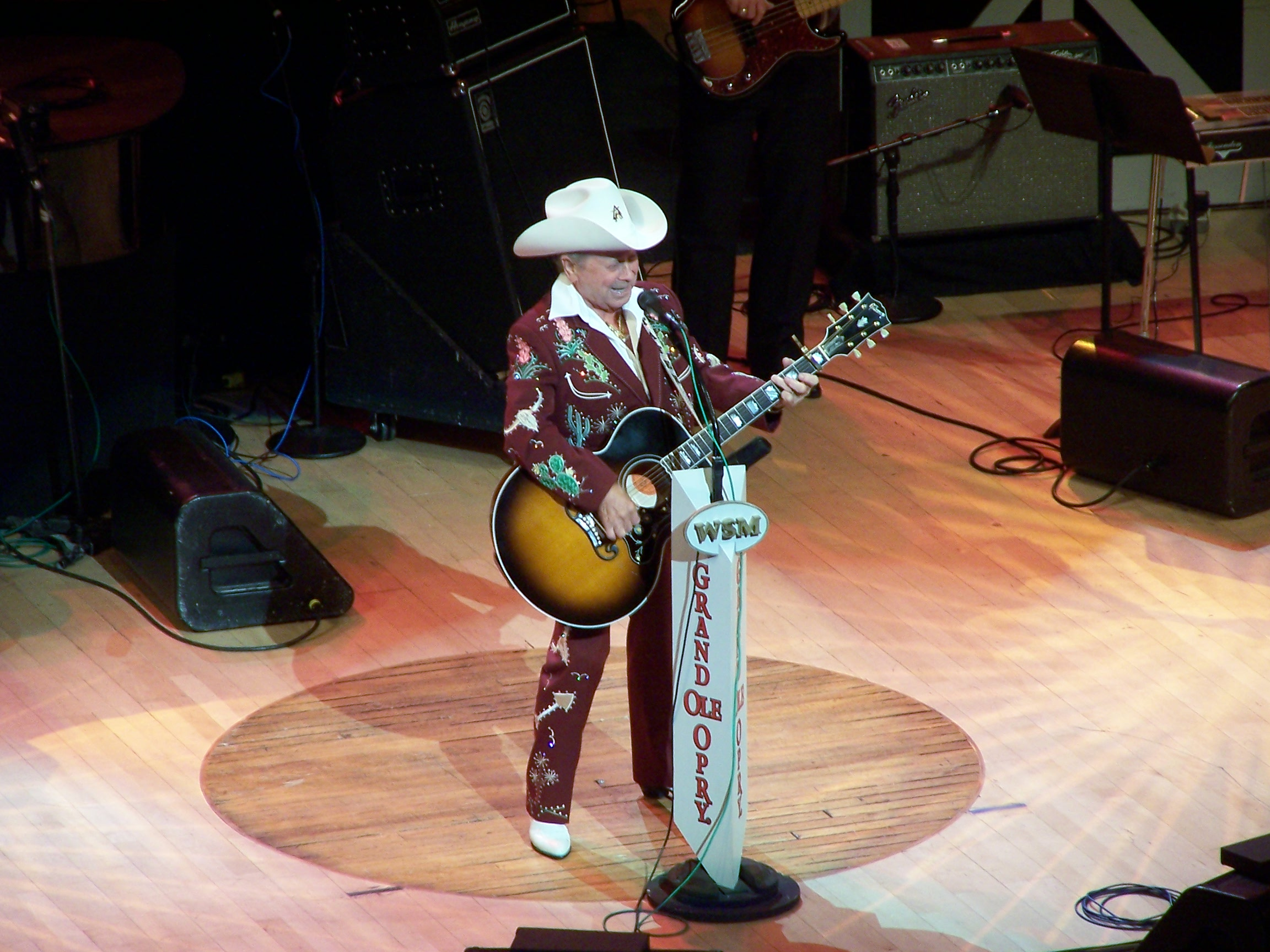
Dickens performing at the Grand Ole Opry House in 2004: Notice the six-foot circle of oak cut from the corner of the Ryman Auditorium's stage and inlaid into center stage at the Grand Ole Opry House.

Toward the end of his life, Dickens made appearances in a number of music videos by fellow West Virginia native and country musician Brad Paisley. He was also featured on several of Paisley's albums in bonus comedy tracks, along with other Opry mainstays such as George Jones and Bill Anderson. They were collectively referred to as the Kung-Pao Buckaroos.

With the death of Hank Locklin in March 2009, Dickens became the oldest living member of the Grand Ole Opry, at the age of 90. He made regular appearances as a host at the Opry, often with the self-deprecating joke that he was also known as "Willie Nelson after taxes", playing on his resemblance to Nelson in his later years, Nelson's highly publicized problems with the Internal Revenue Service, and Dickens' own short stature. At the 2011 CMA Awards, Dickens was dressed as Justin Bieber and made fun of Bieber's then-current paternity scandal.

== Personal life ==
Dickens married Connie Chapman in 1944; the marriage ended in divorce in 1955. Later that year, he married Ernestine Jones; she died in 1968 in an automobile accident while traveling in Texas. He married Mona Evans in 1971. They had two daughters, Pamela Detert and Lisa King.

== Death ==
Dickens was hospitalized after a stroke on December 25, 2014, six days after marking his birthday in what was his last appearance on the Opry. He died of cardiac arrest on January 2, 2015, at the age of 94. After his funeral on January 8, 2015, at the Grand Ole Opry House, Dickens was entombed in the Cross Mausoleum at Woodlawn Memorial Park in Nashville.

== Discography ==
=== Studio albums ===
Year	Album details	Chart positions
Year	Album details	US Country
1954	Old Country Church: Released: 1954; Label: Columbia	—
1960	Big Songs by Little Jimmy Dickens: Released: September 1960; Label: Columbia	—
1962	Little Jimmy Dickens Sings Out Behind the Barn: Released: September 1962; Label: Columbia	—
1965	Handle with Care: Released: February 1965; Label: Columbia	—
1965	May the Bird of Paradise Fly Up Your Nose: Released: November 1965; Label: Columbia	4
1968	Big Man in Country Music: Released: 1968; Label: Columbia	—
1968	Little Jimmy Dickens Sings: Released: March 1968; Label: Decca	—
1969	Jimmy Dickens Comes Callin': Released: February 1969; Label: Decca	—
"—" denotes releases that did not chart.

=== Compilation albums ===
Year	Album details	Chart positions
Year	Album details	US Country
1957	Raisin' the Dickens: Released: November 1957; Label: Columbia	—
1966	Little Jimmy Dickens' Greatest Hits: Released: 1966; Label: Columbia	39
1969	Greatest Hits: Released: 1969; Label: Decca	—
1976	Hymns of the Hour: Released: 1976; Label: Quantum	—
1983	Historic Edition: Released: 1983; Label: Columbia	—
"—" denotes releases that did not chart.

=== Singles ===
Year	Song	Peak positions		Album
Year	Song	US Country	US	Album
1949	"Take an Old Cold 'Tater (And Wait)"	7	—	Raisin' the Dickens
1949	"Country Boy"	7	—	Raisin' the Dickens
1949	"My Heart's Bouquet"	10	—	Big Songs by Little Jimmy Dickens
1949	"A-Sleeping at the Foot of the Bed"	6	—	Raisin' the Dickens
1950	"A Rose from the Bride's Bouquet"	—	—	Non-album singles
1950	"Hillbilly Fever"	3	—	Non-album singles
1950	"F-o-o-l-i-s-h M-e"	—	—	Non-album singles
1950	"Walk, Chicken, Walk"	—	—	Non-album singles
1950	"Out of Business"	—	—	Non-album singles
1950	"I'm Little, but I'm Loud"	—	—	Raisin' the Dickens
1951	"Cold Feet"	—	—	Non-album singles
1951	"What About You"	—	—	Non-album singles
1951	"Sign On the Highway"	—	—	Non-album singles
1951	"Poor Little Darlin'"	—	—	Non-album singles
1951	"Old Rugged Cross" (with the Johnson Family Singers)	—	—	Non-album singles
1952	"They Locked God Outside the Iron Curtain"	—	—	Non-album singles
1952	"Lola Lee"	—	—	Non-album singles
1952	"Hot Diggity Dog"	—	—	Non-album singles
1952	"Waitress, Waitress"	—	—	Non-album singles
1952	"Take Up Thy Cross"	—	—	Old Country Church
1952	"No Tears in Heaven"	—	—	Old Country Church
1952	"Wedding Bell Waltz"	—	—	Non-album single
1953	"I Shall Not Be Moved"	—	—	Old Country Church
1953	"Sidemeat and Cabbage"	—	—	Non-album singles
1953	"I'm Making Love to a Stranger"	—	—	Non-album singles
1953	"Thick and Thin"	—	—	Non-album singles
1953	"No Place Like Home on Christmas"	—	—	Non-album singles
1954	"That Little Old Country Church House"	—	—	Old Country Church
1954	"Y'All Come Home"	—	—	Non-album singles
1954	"You Better Not Do That"	—	—	Non-album singles
1954	"Out Behind the Barn"	9	—	Raisin' the Dickens
1954	"Blackeyed Joe's"	—	—	Non-album singles
1954	"Stinky Pass the Hat Around"	—	—	Non-album singles
1955	"Salty Boogie"	—	—	Non-album singles
1955	"We Could"	—	—	Non-album singles
1955	"I'm Braver Now"	—	—	Non-album singles
1956	"Hey Worm (You Wanna Wiggle)"	—	—	Non-album singles
1956	"Big Sandy"	—	—	Non-album singles
1956	"Country Boy Bounce" (with the Country Boys)	—	—	Non-album singles
1956	"Cornbread and Buttermilk"	—	—	Non-album singles
1956	"Say It Now"	—	—	Non-album singles
1956	"Raisin' the Dickens" (with the Country Boys)	—	—	Non-album singles
1957	"I Never Had the Blues"	—	—	Non-album singles
1957	"Makin' the Rounds"	—	—	Non-album singles
1957	"Family Reunion"	—	—	Non-album singles
1958	"(I Got a) Hole in My Pocket"	—	—	Non-album singles
1959	"When Your House Is Not a Home"	—	—	Non-album singles
1959	"Hannah"	—	—	Non-album singles
1959	"Hey Ma (Hide the Daughter)"	—	—	Non-album singles
1960	"We Lived It Up"	—	—	Non-album singles
1960	"Fireball Mail"	—	—	Big Songs by Little Jimmy Dickens
1961	"Talking to the Wall"	—	—	Non-album single
1962	"Twenty Cigarettes"	—	—	Out Behind the Barn
1962	"The Violet and a Rose"	10	—	Out Behind the Barn
1962	"Police, Police"	—	—	Non-album single
1963	"Another Bridge to Burn"	28	—	Handle with Care
1964	"I Leaned Over Backwards for You"	—	—	Handle with Care
1964	"Is Goodbye That Easy to Say"	—	—	Handle with Care
1965	"He Stands Real Tall"	21	—	Handle with Care
1965	"May the Bird of Paradise Fly Up Your Nose"^{[A]}	1	15	May the Bird of Paradise Fly Up Your Nose
1966	"When the Ship Hit the Sand"	27	103	Greatest Hits
1966	"Who Licked the Red Off Your Candy"	41	—	Big Man in Country Music
1966	"Where the Buffalo Trud"	—	—	Big Man in Country Music
1967	"Country Music Lover"	23	—	Big Man in Country Music
1967	"Jenny Needs a G-String (For Her Old Guitar)"	—	—	Big Man in Country Music
1967	"Daddy and the Wine"	—	—	Little Jimmy Dickens Sings
1968	"I Love Lucy Brown"	—	—	Little Jimmy Dickens Sings
1968	"How to Catch an African Skeeter Alive"	69	—	Little Jimmy Dickens Comes Callin'
1968	"Someday You'll Call My Name"	—	—	Little Jimmy Dickens Comes Callin'
1968	"When You're Seventeen"	55	—	Greatest Hits (1969)
1969	"Times Are Gonna Get Better"	—	—	Non-album singles
1970	"(You've Been Quite a Doll) Raggedy Ann"	75	—	Non-album singles
1970	"Everyday Family Man"	70	—	Non-album singles
1971	"Here It Comes Again"	—	—	Non-album singles
1971	"You Only Want Me for My Body"	—	—	Non-album singles
1972	"Try It, You'll Like It"	61	—	Non-album singles
1972	"Alabam"	—	—	Non-album singles
1973	"Dead Skunk"	—	—	Non-album singles
1976	"Preacherman"	—	—	
1978	"How Much is That Picture of Jesus?"	—	—	
Dash denotes releases that did not chart.

Notes A "May the Bird of Paradise Fly Up Your Nose" also peaked at number 4 on the Canadian RPM Top Singles Chart.

=== B-sides ===
Year	Song	Peak positions	A-Side Single
Year	Song	US Country	A-Side Single
1949	"Pennies for Papa"	12	"Take an Old Cold 'Tater (And Wait)"
1962	"Honky Tonk Troubles"	25	"The Violet and a Rose"
