= Warner Mack =

American country music singer-songwriter (1935–2022)

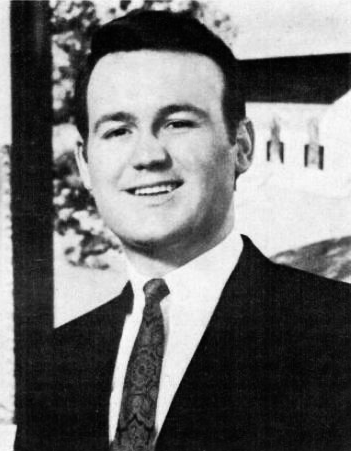
- Mack in 1967

Background information
- Born: Warner Hensley McPherson Jr. April 5, 1935; Nashville, Tennessee, U.S.
- Died: March 1, 2022 (aged 86) Nashville, Tennessee, U.S.
- Genres: Country, Gospel
- Occupation: Singer-songwriter
- Instruments: Vocals, guitar
- Years active: 1957–1992, 2020
- Labels: Decca, Pageboy Kapp Bridgewood, Mack Hart Records
- Website: Official website

Warner McPherson (April 5, 1935 – March 1, 2022), known professionally as Warner Mack, was an American country music singer-songwriter. Mack had 23 hits on the country charts from the late 1950s to the early 1980s.

== Life ==
Mack was born in Nashville, Tennessee, on April 5, 1935. His string of hits included "Is It Wrong (For Loving You)" in 1957 and in 1965 "The Bridge Washed Out".

On April 27, 2020, Mack was interviewed by Scott Wikle for the My Kind Of Country show. At age 85, Mack announced the release of a new album entitled Better Than Ever.

Mack died on March 1, 2022, in Nashville, at the age of 86.

== Discography ==
=== Albums ===
Year	Album	US Country	Label
1964	Everybody's Country Favorites		Kapp
1965	The Bridge Washed Out	14	Decca
1966	The Country Touch	4	Decca
1967	Drifting Apart	21	Decca
1968	The Many Country Moods of Warner Mack	21	Decca
1969	The Country Beat of Warner Mack	42	Decca
1969	I'll Still Be Missing You	30	Decca
1970	Love Hungry		Decca
1971	You Make Me Feel Like a Man		Decca
2020	Better Than Ever		Mack Hart

=== Singles ===
Year	Single	Chart Positions			Album
Year	Single	US Country	US	CAN Country	Album
1957	"Is It Wrong (For Loving You)"	9	61		singles only
1958	"Roc-a-Chicka"		74		singles only
1958	"Falling in Love"				singles only
1958	"Lonesome for You Now"				singles only
1958	"First Chance I Get"				singles only
1959	"Yes There's a Reason"				singles only
1962	"Afraid to Look Back"				singles only
1963	"Working Girl"				The Bridge Washed Out
1964	"Surely"	34			The Bridge Washed Out
1964	"I'll Be Alright in the Morning"				The Bridge Washed Out
1964	"Sittin' in an All Nite Cafe"	4			The Bridge Washed Out
1965	"The Bridge Washed Out"	1			The Bridge Washed Out
1965	"Sittin' on a Rock (Cryin' in a Creek)"	3			The Country Touch
1966	"Talkin' to the Wall"	3			The Country Touch
1966	"It Takes a Lot of Money"	4			Drifting Apart
1967	"Drifting Apart"	8			Drifting Apart
1967	"How Long Will It Take"	4			The Many Country Moods of Warner Mack
1967	"I'd Give the World (To Be Back Loving You)"	11			The Many Country Moods of Warner Mack
1968	"I'm Gonna Move On"	7		10	The Many Country Moods of Warner Mack
1968	"Pray for Your Country"			37	single only
1968	"Don't Wake Me I'm Dreaming"	23		17	The Country Beat of Warner Mack
1969	"Leave My Dream Alone"	6			The Country Beat of Warner Mack
1969	"I'll Still Be Missing You"	8			I'll Still Be Missing You
1970	"Love Hungry"	19		23	Love Hungry
1970	"Live for the Good Times"	16		24	You Make Me Feel Like a Man
1971	"You Make Me Feel Like a Man"	34			You Make Me Feel Like a Man
1971	"I Wanna Be Loved Completely"	53			singles only
1972	"Draggin' the River"	45			singles only
1972	"Your Warm Love"				singles only
1972	"You're Burnin' My House Down"	59			singles only
1973	"Some Roads Have No Ending"	54			singles only
1973	"After the Lights Go Out"				singles only
1973	"Goodbyes Don't Come Easy"	91		74	singles only
1975	"Don't Bring the Rain Down On Me"				singles only
1975	"Who's Making the Change"				singles only
1976	"I've Got a Friend (Just Over the Mountain)"				singles only
1977	"Brush Arbor in the White House"				singles only
1977	"These Crazy Thoughts (Run Through My Mind)"	87			singles only
2021	"Dasher, With a Light Upon His Tail"				singles only
2021	"Angel Tree"				singles only
2022	"He Touched Me (He Can Touch You Too)"				singles only
