= Blue Kentucky Girl (song) =

1965 single by Loretta Lynn

Single by Loretta Lynn

from the album Blue Kentucky Girl
- B-side: "Two Steps Forward"
- Released: 22 May 1965
- Recorded: 14 October 1964
- Studio: Columbia (Nashville, Tennessee)
- Genre: Country
- Label: Decca
- Songwriter: Johnny Mullins
- Producer: Owen Bradley

Loretta Lynn singles chronology
"Happy Birthday" (1965)	"Blue Kentucky Girl" (1965)	"Our Hearts Are Holding Hands" (1965)

"Blue Kentucky Girl" is a song written by Johnny Mullins, and originally recorded by American country music artist Loretta Lynn. It was released in May 1965 as the first single and title track from the album Blue Kentucky Girl. The song reached number 7 on the Billboard Hot Country Singles & Tracks chart.

== Chart performance ==
Chart (1965)	Peak position
US Hot Country Songs (Billboard)	7

== Emmylou Harris version ==
"Blue Kentucky Girl"

Single by Emmylou Harris

from the album Blue Kentucky Girl
- B-side: "Leaving Louisiana in the Broad Daylight"
- Released: 22 September 1979
- Genre: Country
- Length: 3:21
- Label: Warner Bros. Nashville
- Songwriter: Johnny Mullins
- Producer: Brian Ahern

Emmylou Harris singles chronology
"Save the Last Dance for Me" (1979)	"Blue Kentucky Girl" (1979)	"Beneath Still Waters" (1980)

"Blue Kentucky Girl" was also a single for American country music artist Emmylou Harris. Harris' version released in September 1979 as the second single and title track from her album Blue Kentucky Girl. The song reached number 6 on the Billboard Hot Country Singles & Tracks chart. Based on this version, the song was nominated for the Grammy Award for Best Country Song in 1980.

=== Chart performance ===
Chart (1979)	Peak position
US Hot Country Songs (Billboard)	6
Canadian RPM Country Tracks	7

== Other versions ==
Skeeter Davis recorded the song for her 1982 album Live Wire.
