= Make the World Go Away =

1963 single, 1965 hit for Eddy Arnold

- Dutch release picture sleeve

Single by Ray Price

from the album Burning Memories
- A-side: "Night Life"
- Released: June 26, 1963
- Recorded: 1963
- Genre: Country
- Length: 2:31
- Label: Columbia
- Songwriter: Hank Cochran
- Producers: Don Law, Frank Jones

Ray Price singles chronology
"Walk Me to the Door" (1963)	"Make the World Go Away" (1963)	"Night Life" (1963)

"Make the World Go Away"

Single by Timi Yuro

from the album Make the World Go Away
- B-side: "Look Down"
- Released: June 7, 1963
- Recorded: 1963
- Genre: Blue-eyed soul
- Label: Liberty
- Songwriter: Hank Cochran
- Producer: Chet Atkins

Timi Yuro singles chronology
"Insult to Injury" (1963)	"Make the World Go Away" (1963)	"Gotta Travel On" (1963)

"Make the World Go Away"

Single by Eddy Arnold

from the album My World
- B-side: "The Easy Way"
- Released: October 1965
- Recorded: June 22, 1965
- Studio: RCA Victor Studio (Nashville, Tennessee)
- Genre: Country
- Label: RCA Victor
- Songwriter: Hank Cochran
- Producer: Chet Atkins

Eddy Arnold singles chronology
"I'm Letting You Go" (1965)	"Make the World Go Away" (1965)	"I Want to Go with You" (1966)

"Make the World Go Away'" is a country song composed by Hank Cochran. It has become a Top 40 popular success three times: for Timi Yuro (1963), Eddy Arnold (1965), and the brother-sister duo Donny and Marie Osmond (1975). The original version of the song was recorded by Ray Price in 1963.

In 1999, the 1965 Eddy Arnold version of the song on RCA Records was inducted into the Grammy Hall of Fame.

== History ==
Hank Cochran wrote the song while he was on a date at a movie theater in 1960 when the film inspired him. He left the theater quickly, and by the time he got home fifteen minutes later had composed "Make the World Go Away".

Ray Price recorded the song, and it scored No.2 on the Billboard country charts in 1963. The next year Eddy Arnold would make the song his signature hit, scoring No. 1 on the country music charts and then in 1965 No. 6 on the overall Billboard Hot 100 chart (his highest rated song ever).

Cochran was already a successful songwriter, having written two successes for Patsy Cline: "I Fall to Pieces" (with Harlan Howard) and "She's Got You". "Make the World Go Away" was recorded first by Ray Price for Columbia Records. Produced by Don Law and Frank Jones, it was one of Price's first songs to feature an orchestra and female chorus, a trend that continued with other songs like "Burning Memories" and "For the Good Times".

Price's album peaked at No. 2 on the country chart and No. 100 on the album chart.

== Versions ==
Many artists have covered this song over the years; here are a few examples:

During 1963, Timi Yuro released a soul music version of the song from her album of the same name. A moderate success, the single reached No. 24 on the Billboard U.S. top 40 music chart and as much as No. 11 on the Canadian charts.

At his last recording session in July 1964, Jim Reeves recorded a version of the song which became the opening track to his 1965 album The Jim Reeves Way.

"Make the World Go Away" was a greater success for Eddy Arnold during 1965, scoring No. 1 on the country music chart and also scoring No. 1 on the adult contemporary chart. It reached No. 6 on the singles chart. "Make the World Go Away" was part of the so-called Nashville sound, an early mixture of popular with country music, and it became one of the most popular recordings of 1960s country music. It is generally considered to be Arnold's best-known song. The musicians on the Arnold session were Grady Martin, Velma Smith (guitars), Henry Strzelecki (bass), Jerry Carrigan (drums), Floyd Cramer (piano), Bill Walker (vibes), Harvey Wolfe (cello), Pamela Goldsmith, Ruby Ann Story (violas), Brenton Banks, Solie Fott, Lillian Hunt, Martin Kathan, Shelly Kurland (violins), and the Anita Kerr Singers (vocal chorus). In 2020, this version was selected by the Library of Congress for preservation in the National Recording Registry for being "culturally, historically, or aesthetically significant".

Harry James recorded a version on the 1966 album Harry James & His Western Friends (Dot DLP 3735 and DLP 25735) and again on the 1977 album Comin' from a Good Place (Sheffield Lab LAB 6).

Elvis Presley's 1970 version of "Make the World Go Away" was the closing track of his album Elvis Country (I'm 10,000 Years Old).

Dean Martin included his interpretation of the song on his 1970 album My Woman, My Woman, My Wife.

During 1975, Donny Osmond and Marie Osmond covered "Make the World Go Away", scoring hits in the UK and the United States. The song was recorded by the pair on the MGM album of the same title.

During 1978, country music singer Charly McClain covered "Make the World Go Away" for her second album, Let Me Be Your Baby. The single, with "Leanin' on the Bottle" as the B-side, reached No. 73 on the country charts.

Roger Whittaker covered the song for the 1987 album His Finest Collection.

During 2005, Martina McBride covered "Make the World Go Away" for her album Timeless.

Other popular singers who have covered the song include Engelbert Humperdinck, Jimmie Rogers and Tom Jones.

At the 2008 Academy of Country Music Awards program, Carrie Underwood and Brad Paisley sang the song as a duet to honor Eddy Arnold for his long career in country music. "Make the World Go Away" is the song playing on the radio of the car in Underwood's 2008 music video for her single "Just a Dream".

In October 2012, Alison Krauss and Jamey Johnson performed their version of this song on the Late Show with David Letterman, promoting the album Living for a Song: A Tribute to Hank Cochran.

Jim Adkins of American rock band Jimmy Eat World covered the song on various dates of his first European solo tour.

The Secret Sisters have been performing the song at some of their concerts since 2015.

Country singer Kelsea Ballerini performed the song on the Grand Ole Opry in 2016.

== Foreign-language versions ==
In Italy there were two local versions: the first, with the title Resta solo come sei (Stay as just the way you are), with the Italian lyrics written by Leo Chiosso, was recorded in 1964 by Iva Zanicchi; the second, with the title Qualche cosa tra noi (Something between us), adapted and arranged by Maestro Giancarlo Chiaramello, was recorded in the late 1967 by the Japanese singer Yoko Kishi.

== Use in television and film ==
The song is featured in AMAZON's Fallout TV series, specifically in Season 2 - Episode 1, "The Innovator" (2025). It plays during a poignant pre-war flashback where Cooper Howard (The Ghoul) attempts to drive away with his daughter, Janey. The song provides a somber, emotional contrast to the impending nuclear devastation, highlighting themes of personal loss.

The song appears twice in the 2015 British gangster film Legend (based on the story of London's Kray twins); once as a 'live' performance in cabaret by Welsh singer Duffy, portraying Timi Yuro, in a nightclub scene, and then again when the original Timi Yuro single version is played over the film's closing credits. Yuro was allegedly a favorite singer of Reggie Kray and was often booked to perform at the Krays' nightclubs when she was touring Europe in the 1960s.

The Mickey Gilley cover is featured in GTA: San Andreas’s K-Rose radio station. This causes an anachronism, as the cover was released in 1999 and the game takes place in 1992.

== Chart positions ==
=== Ray Price version ===
Chart (1963)	Peak position
US Hot Country Songs (Billboard)	2
US Billboard Hot 100	100

=== Timi Yuro version ===
Chart (1963)	Peak position
US Adult Contemporary (Billboard)	8
US Billboard Hot 100	24

=== Eddy Arnold version ===
Chart (1965)	Peak position
US Hot Country Songs (Billboard)	1
US Billboard Hot 100	6
US Adult Contemporary (Billboard)	1
Canada AC (Billboard)	2
UK Singles (Official Charts)	8

=== Donny and Marie Osmond version ===
Chart (1975)	Peak position
US Hot Country Songs (Billboard)	71
US Billboard Hot 100	44
US Adult Contemporary (Billboard)	31
Canada AC (Billboard)	40
Canada Hot 100 (Billboard)	33
UK Singles (Official Charts)	18
Ireland (IRMA)	20

=== Charly McClain version ===
Chart (1977)	Peak position
US Hot Country Songs (Billboard)	73

=== Mickey Gilley Version ===
Chart (1997)	Peak position
US Billboard Hot 100	19
