= May the Bird of Paradise Fly up Your Nose =

Single by Little Jimmy Dickens

from the album May the Bird of Paradise Fly up Your Nose
- B-side: "My Eyes Are Jealous"
- Released: September 7, 1965
- Genre: Country
- Length: 2:28
- Label: Columbia
- Songwriter(s): Neal Merritt
- Producer(s): Don Law; Frank Jones

Little Jimmy Dickens singles chronology
| "He Stands Real Tall" (1965) | "May the Bird of Paradise Fly up Your Nose" (1965) | "When the Ship Hit the Sand" (1966) |

"May the Bird of Paradise Fly up Your Nose" is a 1965 novelty song performed by Little Jimmy Dickens. It was Dickens' most successful single on the U.S. country music chart. It spent two weeks at No. 1 that November, and stayed on the chart for a total of 18 weeks. On the overall Billboard Hot 100 the song peaked at No. 15. It was his only Top 40 hit on the latter chart.

The song, written by Neal Merritt, was inspired by one of the many comic putdowns uttered by host Johnny Carson on The Tonight Show.

== Content ==
The song features three verses, each of which mentions an incident where Dickens (the narrator) acts in a cheap and/or rude manner that insults the other person:

- In the first verse, Dickens sees a beggar and proceeds to give him only a penny.
- In the second verse, Dickens gets a call from his laundryman, who returns $100 that Dickens left in his clothes. Dickens gives him 10 cents, to compensate him for the phone call.
- In the final verse, Dickens asks a cabdriver to rush so he can catch a train; the driver is ticketed for speeding, while Dickens stands by, waiting for the change from his fare.

The chorus is an insult, said back to Dickens, for his cheapness. The title, sung in the chorus, references the Bird-of-paradise.

The distinctive guitar work was done by Grady Martin, using the brand new Echoplex unit which had just been released.

== Chart performance ==
| Chart (1965) | Peak position |
|---|---|
| U.S. Billboard Hot Country Singles | 1 |
| U.S. Billboard Hot 100 | 15 |
| U.S. Billboard Easy Listening | 8 |
| Canadian RPM Top Singles | 4 |
