= What's He Doing in My World =

Single by Eddy Arnold

from the album My World
- B-side: "Laura Lee"
- Released: March 1965
- Recorded: January 13, 1965
- Studio: RCA Victor Studio, 800 17th Ave. South, Nashville, TN
- Genre: Country
- Label: RCA Victor
- Songwriter(s): Carl Belew; Billy Joe Moore; Eddie Bush
- Producer(s): Chet Atkins

Eddy Arnold singles chronology
"I Thank My Lucky Stars" (1964)	"What's He Doing in My World" (1965)	"I'm Letting You Go" (1965)

"What's He Doing in My World" is a 1965 single by Eddy Arnold. The single was Arnold's 20th number one on the U.S. country chart, and his first number one in 10 years. "What's He Doing in My World" stayed at number one for two weeks and spent a total of 24 weeks on the chart.

== Chart performance ==
Chart (1965)	Peak position
U.S. Billboard Hot Country Singles	1
U.S. Billboard Hot 100	60
U.S. Billboard Easy Listening	18
